= 2023 Penang F.C. season =

Penang
2023 season
- Chairman: Soon Lip Chee (until 16 August); Daniel Gooi (from 16 August)
- Head coach: Chong Yee Fatt (from 28 February to 30 March); Manzoor Azwira (from 30 March to 3 August); Chong Yee Fatt (from 3 August to 7 November); Akmal Rizal (caretaker, from 7 November)
- Stadium: City Stadium
- Super League: 10th
- Malaysia FA Cup: Quarter-finals
- Malaysia Cup: Round of 16
- MFL Challenge Cup: Semi-finals
- Top goalscorer: League: Soony Saad (6); All: Soony Saad (10)
- Highest home attendance: 6,051 vs Johor Darul Ta'zim, Super League, 4 June 2023
- Lowest home attendance: 212 vs PDRM, MFL Challenge Cup, 21 October 2023
- Average home league attendance: 2,568
- Biggest win: 4–0 vs Kuching City, FA Cup, 15 April 2023
- Biggest defeat: 0–8 vs Johor Darul Ta'zim, Super League, 16 December 2023
| Home colours | Away colours | Third colours |

The 2023 season is Penang's 97th competitive season, 3rd season in the first tier of Malaysian football since promoted in 2020, 102nd year in existence as a football club, and the 3rd year since rebranded as Penang Football Club. The season covers the period from 1 December 2022 to 30 November 2023.

== Coaching Staffs ==
| Position | Name |
|---|---|
| Head Coach | (Malaysia) Chong Yee Fatt |
| Assistant Head Coach 1 | (Malaysia) Manzoor Azwira |
| Assistant Head Coach 2 | (Malaysia) Md Noor Md Derus |
| Assistant Coach | (Malaysia) Mat Saiful Mohamad |
| Goalkeeping Coach | (Malaysia) Mohd Hisham Jainudin |
| Fitness Coach | (Malaysia) Zahidibudiman Ibrahim |
| Assistant Fitness Coach | (Malaysia) Rozy Abdul Majid |
| Team Doctor | (Malaysia) Hardeep Singh Jaginder Singh (Malaysia) Parmjit Singh Kuldip Singh |
| Physiotherapist | (Malaysia) Izzul Naim Jamil |
| Kit Man | (Malaysia) Sufie Noorazizan |
| U-23 Head Coach | (Malaysia) Akmal Rizal Ahmad Rakhli |
| U-23 Assistant Head Coach | (Malaysia) Kamal Daut |
| U-23 Assistant Coach | (Malaysia) Farkhis Fisol |
| U-23 Goalkeeping Coach | (Malaysia) Azmirulkifli Haji Mohd Isa |
| U-23 Fitness Coach | (Malaysia) Mohd Rozy Abdul Majid |
| U-23 Physiotherapist | (Malaysia) Amirul Ehsan Mahrim |
| U-23 Kit Man | (Malaysia) Mohd Hafiz |
| U-21 Team Head Coach | (Malaysia) Wan Rohaimi |
| U-19 Team Head Coach | (Malaysia) K. Mahendran |

== Players ==
=== First-team squad ===
As of 4 August 2023

Note: Flags indicate national team as defined under FIFA eligibility rules; some limited exceptions apply. Players may hold more than one non-FIFA nationality.

| No. | Pos. | Nation | Player |
|---|---|---|---|
| 1 | GK | MAS | Azfar Arif |
| 2 | DF | MAS | Haziq Puad (on loan from Perak) |
| 3 | DF | MYA | Zaw Min Tun |
| 6 | DF | MAS | Khairul Akmal |
| 7 | FW | LBN | Soony Saad |
| 8 | MF | MAS | Asnan Ahmad |
| 9 | FW | MAS | Kogileswaran Raj |
| 10 | FW | BRA | Adriano Narcizo |
| 11 | FW | MAS | Amer Azahar |
| 12 | DF | MAS | Danish Haziq (on loan from Perak) |
| 15 | DF | MAS | Fairuz Zakaria |
| 17 | DF | BRA | Rafael Vitor (captain) |
| 19 | MF | MAS | Al-Hafiz Harun (on loan from Kedah Darul Aman) |
| 20 | FW | MAS | Rahmat Makasuf (on loan from Terengganu) |
| 21 | DF | JPN | Ryu Yamaguchi |
| 22 | GK | MAS | Khatul Anuar |

| No. | Pos. | Nation | Player |
|---|---|---|---|
| 25 | GK | MAS | Shafiq Afifi |
| 26 | DF | MAS | Namathevan Arunasalam |
| 27 | MF | MAS | Hadin Azman |
| 28 | MF | FRA | Ousmane Fane |
| 29 | DF | MAS | Faris Shah |
| 32 | FW | MAS | Nur Izzat |
| 33 | MF | MAS | Nik Akif |
| 37 | DF | MAS | Azmeer Aris |
| 46 | DF | MAS | Adib Raop |
| 66 | MF | MAS | Zahril Azri (on loan from Selangor) |
| 72 | FW | IRL | Abdul Abdeen Temitope |
| 82 | MF | MAS | Azrie Reza |
| — | MF | MAS | Faiz Mazlan |

=== Out on loan ===
Note: Flags indicate national team as defined under FIFA eligibility rules; some limited exceptions apply. Players may hold more than one non-FIFA nationality.

| No. | Pos. | Nation | Player |
|---|---|---|---|
| 18 | MF | MAS | Marcus Mah (on loan to Bukit Tambun until 30 November 2023) |

=== Under-23s ===
As of 2 March 2023

Note: Flags indicate national team as defined under FIFA eligibility rules; some limited exceptions apply. Players may hold more than one non-FIFA nationality.

| No. | Pos. | Nation | Player |
|---|---|---|---|
| 1 | GK | MAS | Wahiey Amir |
| 3 | DF | MAS | Aikmal Roslan |
| 4 | DF | MAS | Thinusean Pillai |
| 5 | DF | MAS | Zarif Syamil |
| 6 | MF | MAS | Izzat Zikri |
| 7 | MF | MAS | Shafi Azswad |
| 8 | MF | MAS | Adib Haqimi |
| 9 | MF | MAS | Daniel Irfan |
| 10 | MF | MAS | Aidil Danial |
| 11 | MF | MAS | Ilhan Hakim |
| 12 | MF | MAS | Khariul Ikram |
| 13 | MF | MAS | Syamel Idzham |
| 14 | DF | MAS | Haleif Hazreil |
| 15 | DF | MAS | Iman Rafaei |
| 16 | FW | MAS | Alif Ikmalrizal |
| 17 | FW | MAS | Haziq Kutty Abba |

| No. | Pos. | Nation | Player |
|---|---|---|---|
| 18 | MF | MAS | Idrzuwan Daud |
| 19 | DF | MAS | Mujibur Rahman |
| 20 | MF | MAS | Shahmi Irfan Talaha |
| 21 | MF | MAS | Amirul Irfan |
| 22 | GK | MAS | Ashriq Izzat |
| 23 | DF | MAS | Aidil Azuan |
| 24 | MF | MAS | Adam Iskandar |
| 25 | MF | MAS | Akid Aiman |
| 26 | DF | MAS | Syameer Zamri |
| 27 | MF | MAS | Hazwan Hassan |
| 28 | DF | MAS | Dhia Ramadhan |
| 29 | FW | MAS | Amirul Ashrafiq |
| 30 | GK | MAS | Haziq Mukriz |
| 33 | FW | MAS | Hasri Firzan |

=== Development squads ===
For further information: Penang F.C. Reserves

== Transfers and contracts ==
=== In ===
==== 1st Transfer Window ====
| No. | Pos. | Name | Moving from | Type | Transfer Date | Transfer fee |
|---|---|---|---|---|---|---|
| | MF | (Malaysia) Marcus Mah | (Malaysia) PJ City | Transfer | December 2022 | Free |
| | MF | (Malaysia) Nik Akif | (Malaysia) Terengganu | Transfer | December 2022 | Free |
| | FW | (Malaysia) Nur Izzat | (Malaysia) Sri Pahang | Transfer | December 2022 | Free |
| | DF | (Malaysia) Faris Shah Rosli | (Malaysia) Melaka United | Transfer | December 2022 | Free |
| | MF | (Malaysia) Amer Azahar | (Malaysia) Kedah Darul Aman | Transfer | December 2022 | Free |
| | MF | (Malaysia) Rahmat Makasuf | (Malaysia) Terengganu | Loan | December 2022 | |
| | DF | (Japan) Ryu Yamaguchi | (Spain) FC Malaga City Academy | Transfer | December 2022 | |
| | FW | (Lebanon) Soony Saad | (Thailand) PT Prachuap | Transfer | December 2022 | Free |
| | FW | (Brazil) Giovane Gomes | (Brazil) Caxias | Transfer | December 2022 | |
| | MF | (Philippines) Curt Dizon | (Philippines) United City | Transfer | December 2022 | |
| | DF | (Malaysia) Namathevan Arunasalam | (Malaysia) Negeri Sembilan | Transfer | December 2022 | Free |
| | FW | (Brazil) Adriano | (Malaysia) Melaka United | Transfer | December 2022 | Free |
| | DF | (Malaysia) Azmeer Aris | (Malaysia) Kedah Darul Aman | Transfer | December 2022 | |
| | GK | (Malaysia) Azfar Arif | (Malaysia) PJ City | Transfer | December 2022 | |
| | DF | (Malaysia) Danish Haziq | (Malaysia) Perak | Loan | December 2022 | |
| | MF | (Malaysia) Asnan Ahmad | (Malaysia) Kedah Darul Aman | Transfer | December 2022 | Free |
| | FW | (Malaysia) Norshahmi Irfan Talaha | (Malaysia) Kelatan United | Transfer | December 2022 | Free |
| | DF | (Myanmar) Zaw Min Tun | (Thailand) Chonburi | Transfer | December 2022 | Free |
| | MF | (Malaysia) Hadin Azman | (Malaysia) Kuala Lumpur City | Transfer | December 2022 | Free |
| | DF | (South Korea) Ahn Sae-hee | (Vietnam) Hoang Anh Gia Lai | Transfer | December 2022 | Free |
| | MF | (France) Ousmane Fané | (France) Morecambe | Transfer | January 2023 | Free |

==== 2nd Transfer Window ====
| No. | Pos. | Name | Moving from | Type | Transfer Date | Transfer fee |
|---|---|---|---|---|---|---|
| 2 | DF | (Malaysia) Haziq Puad | (Malaysia) Perak | Loan | July 2023 | |
| 19 | MF | (Malaysia) Al-Hafiz Harun | (Malaysia) Kedah Darul Aman | Loan | July 2023 | |
| 9 | FW | (Malaysia) Kogileswaran Raj | (South Korea) Chungbuk Cheongju | Transfer | July 2023 | Free |
| 72 | FW | (Republic of Ireland) Abdul Abdeen Temitope | (Albania) KF Skënderbeu Korçë | Transfer | July 2023 | Free |

=== Released ===
| No. | Pos. | Name | To | Type | Transfer Date | Transfer fee | | | | | | | | |
|---|---|---|---|---|---|---|---|---|---|---|---|---|---|---|
| 10 | FW | (Lebanon) Hilal El-Helwe | Free agent | Mutual consent | 20 October 2022 | Free | | | | | | | | |
| 2 | DF | (Malaysia) Ariff Ar-Rasyid | (Malaysia) Kelantan United | End of contract | 1 December 2022 | Free | | | | | | | | |
| 4 | DF | (Malaysia) Sukri Hamid | (Malaysia) Harini | End of contract | 1 December 2022 | Free | | | | | | | | |
| 7 | FW | (Brazil) Lucas Silva | (Malaysia) Sri Pahang | End of contract | 1 December 2022 | Free | | | | | | | | |
| 8 | MF | (Malaysia) Danial Ashraf | (Malaysia) Kelantan | End of contract | 1 December 2022 | Free | | | | | | | | |
| 9 | FW | (Brazil) Casagrande | (Malaysia) Negeri Sembilan | End of contract | 1 December 2022 | Free | | | | | | | | |
| 11 | DF | (Malaysia) Jafri Firdaus Chew | (Malaysia) Sabah | End of contract | 1 December 2022 | Free | | | | | | | | |
| 12 | FW | (Malaysia) Azim Rahim | (Malaysia) Immigration | End of contract | 1 December 2022 | Free | | | | | | | | |
| 14 | MF | (Brazil) Endrick | (Malaysia) Johor Darul Ta'zim | End of contract | 1 December 2022 | Free | | | | | | | | |
| 18 | MF | (Malaysia) Tam Sheang Tsung | (Malaysia) KL Rovers | End of contract | 1 December 2022 | Free | | | | | | | | |
| 19 | DF | (Malaysia) Thivandran Karnan | (Malaysia) Melaka | End of contract | 1 December 2022 | Free | | | | | | | | |
| 20 | MF | (Malaysia) Rafiuddin Roddin | (Malaysia) Bukit Tambun | End of contract | 1 December 2022 | Free | | | | | | | | |
| 24 | DF | (Malaysia) Syazwan Zaipol | (Malaysia) Melaka | End of contract | 1 December 2022 | Free | | | | | | | | |
| 25 | DF | (Malaysia) Azzizan Nordin | Free agent | End of contract | 1 December 2022 | Free | | | | | | | | |
| 26 | MF | (Malaysia) T. Saravanan | (Malaysia) Selangor | End of loan | 1 December 2022 | Free | | | | | | | | |
| 28 | GK | (Malaysia) Hafizul Hakim | (Malaysia) Harini | End of contract | 1 December 2022 | Free | | | | | | | | |
| 29 | MF | (Malaysia) Faizal Talib | (Malaysia) Kedah Darul Aman | End of contract | 1 December 2022 | Free | | | | | | | | |
| 32 | DF | (Philippines) Christian Rontini | (Malaysia) Kelantan | End of contract | 1 December 2022 | Free | | | | | | | | |
| 44 | MF | (Malaysia) Gopi Rizqi | (Malaysia) KL Rovers | End of contract | 1 December 2022 | Free | | | | | | | | |
| 4 | DF | (South Korea) An Sae-hee | Free agent | Mutual consent | May 2023 | Free | | | | | | | | |
| 19 | FW | (Philippines) Curt Dizon | Free agent | Mutual consent | May 2023 | Free | | | | | | | | |
| 88 | GK | (Malaysia) Rendy Rining | Free agent | Mutual consent | June 2023 | Free | | | | | | | | |
| 9 | FW | (Brazil) Giovane Gomes | Free agent | Mutual consent | July 2023 | Free | - | 23 | MF | (Malaysia) Faizat Ghazli | Free agent | Mutual consent | August 2023 | Free |

== Friendlies ==
| 14 January 2023 Friendly | Penang | 3–0 | Manjung City | Batu Kawan, Penang |
| 20:45 UTC+8 | | | | Stadium: Penang State Stadium |

| 24 January 2023 Friendly | Negeri Sembilan | 1–2 | Penang | Paroi, Negeri Sembilan |
| 21:00 UTC+8 | Shahrel 19' | | Gomes 4'; Adriano 45' | Stadium: Tuanku Abdul Rahman Stadium |

| 28 January 2023 Friendly | Perak | 0–1 | Penang | Ipoh, Perak |
| 21:00 UTC+8 | | | Hadin 90+5' | Stadium: Perak Stadium |

| 1 February 2023 Piala Harapan 2023 | Penang | 4–0 | Geylang International | Batu Kawan, Penang |
| 21:00 UTC+8 | Azmeer 24'; Rafael 28'; Rahmat 34'; Gomes 82' | | | Stadium: Penang State Stadium |

| 4 February 2023 Piala Harapan 2023 | Penang | 2–1 | Selangor | Batu Kawan, Penang |
| 21:00 UTC+8 | Saad 74', 88' | | Mukhairi 24' | Stadium: Penang State Stadium; Attendance: 5,292; Referee: Nazmi Nasaruddin |

| 19 February 2023 Friendly | Penang | 4–2 | Bukit Tambun | Batu Kawan, Penang |
| 21:00 UTC+8 | | | | Stadium: Penang State Stadium |

| 14 May 2023 Friendly | Penang | 5–2 | Kedah | Batu Kawan, Penang |
| 20:30 UTC+8 | Soony 39'; Adib 63'; Adriano 68'; Nur Izzat 86'; Hadin 90+1' | | Balotelli 21'; Lee Tuck 74' | Stadium: Penang State Stadium |

== Competitions ==
=== Malaysia Super League ===
==== League table ====
| Pos | Team | Pld | W | D | L | GF | GA | GD | Pts |
|---|---|---|---|---|---|---|---|---|---|
| 8 | PDRM | 26 | 11 | 4 | 11 | 35 | 37 | −2 | 37 |
| 9 | Negeri Sembilan | 26 | 6 | 9 | 11 | 33 | 49 | −16 | 27 |
| 10 | Penang | 26 | 6 | 6 | 14 | 29 | 50 | −21 | 24 |
| 11 | Perak | 26 | 6 | 4 | 16 | 25 | 55 | −30 | 22 |
| 12 | Kelantan United | 26 | 4 | 5 | 17 | 29 | 65 | −36 | 17 |

Source: MFL
Rules for classification: 1) Points; 2) Goal difference; 3) Number of goals scored.

==== Result summary ====
| Overall | | | | | | | | Home | | | | | | Away | | | | | |
| Pld | W | D | L | GF | GA | GD | Pts | W | D | L | GF | GA | GD | W | D | L | GF | GA | GD |
|---|---|---|---|---|---|---|---|---|---|---|---|---|---|---|---|---|---|---|---|
| 26 | 6 | 6 | 14 | 29 | 50 | −21 | 24 | 6 | 3 | 4 | 23 | 19 | +4 | 0 | 3 | 10 | 6 | 31 | −25 |

Last updated: 18 December 2023.
Source: MFL

==== Results by matchday ====
| Matchday | 1 | 2 | 3 | 4 | 5 | 6 | 7 | 8 | 9 | 10 | 11 | 12 | 13 | 14 | 15 | 16 | 17 | 18 | 19 | 20 | 21 | 22 | 23 | 24 | 25 | 26 |
|---|---|---|---|---|---|---|---|---|---|---|---|---|---|---|---|---|---|---|---|---|---|---|---|---|---|---|
| Ground | A | H | A | H | A | H | A | H | H | H | A | A | H | H | A | H | A | H | A | H | A | A | A | H | H | A |
| Result | D | D | L | L | L | W | L | W | W | W | L | L | L | D | D | W | L | L | L | L | L | L | D | W | D | L |
| Position | 7 | 7 | 9 | 11 | 13 | 9 | 10 | 10 | 8 | 7 | 9 | 9 | 10 | 10 | 10 | 9 | 10 | 10 | 10 | 10 | 10 | 10 | 11 | 10 | 10 | 10 |

Updated to match(es) played on 18 December 2023. Source: MFL
A = Away; H = Home; W = Win; D = Draw; L = Loss

==== Matches ====
Win Draw Loss

| 25 February 2023 1 | Kuala Lumpur City | 2–2 | Penang | Cheras, Kuala Lumpur |
| 21:00 UTC+8 | Josué 15', 72', (yellow card) 56'; Morales (yellow card) 29'; Kenny (yellow card) 31'; Anwar (yellow card) 39' | Report | Rahmat (yellow card) 29'; Namathevan (yellow card) 38' (yellow-red card) 57'; Hadin 72'; Gomes 85' | Stadium: KLFA Stadium; Attendance: 1,291; Referee: Tuan Mohd Yaasin Bin Tuan Mohd Hanafiah |

| 1 March 2023 2 | Penang | 0–0 | Negeri Sembilan | Georgetown, Penang |
| 21:00 UTC+8 | Rahmat (yellow card) 45+2' | Report | Goulon (yellow card) 76' | Stadium: City Stadium; Attendance: 3,754; Referee: Mohd Hasrol Mohd Amir |

| 5 March 2023 3 | Kelantan | 2–0 | Penang | Kota Bahru, Kelantan |
| 21:00 UTC+8 | Akinade 22'; Rontini (yellow card) 33' (yellow-red card) 66'; Fazrul 36'; Ghaffar (yellow card) 44'; Afzal (yellow card) 88' | Report | Gomes (yellow card) 32'; Saad (red card) 68'; Namathevan (yellow card) 82'; Faris (yellow card) 89' | Stadium: Sultan Muhammad IV Stadium; Attendance: 6,011; Referee: Zulkarnain Zakaria |

| 12 March 2023 4 | Penang | 1–2 | Selangor | Georgetown, Penang |
| 17:30 UTC+8 | Rafael 87' | Report | del Valle 27'; Zikri (yellow card) 61'; Al-Rawabdeh 90', (yellow card) 90' | Stadium: City Stadium; Attendance: 4,919; Referee: Suhaizi Shukri |

| 17 March 2023 5 | Sabah | 5–2 | Penang | Kota Kinabalu, Sabah |
| 20:15 UTC+8 | Park 3', 60'; Lok 45' (pen.); Ting (yellow card) 49', (goal) 55'; Paraiba (yellow card) 66'; Wilkin (yellow card) 86'; Rizal 90+12' (pen.) | Report | Saad 8'; Khatul (yellow card) 41'; Fané (yellow card) 47'; Adriano 90+1' (pen.); Zaw (yellow card) 90+9' | Stadium: Likas Stadium; Attendance: 11,711; Referee: Zulkarnain Zakaria |

| 31 March 2023 6 | Penang | 3–1 | Perak | Georgetown, Penang |
| 22:00 UTC+8 | Saad 6'; Nik Akif 37'; Gomes 84' | Report | Hafizal (yellow card) 57'; Seo 71' | Stadium: City Stadium; Attendance: 3,540; Referee: Kamil Zakaria |

| 5 April 2023 7 | Kedah Darul Aman | 1–0 | Penang | Alor Setar, Kedah |
| 22:00 UTC+8 | Juraboev (yellow card) 26'; Afiq (yellow card) 34' (yellow-red card) 54'; Ariff (yellow card) 37'; Lira 65' | Report | Rafael (yellow card) 47'; Faris (yellow card) 72' | Stadium: Darul Aman Stadium; Attendance: 3,230; Referee: Mohd Hasrol Mohd Amir |

| 9 April 2023 8 | Penang | 4–2 | PDRM | Georgetown, Penang |
| 22:00 UTC+8 | James 12' (o.g.); Saad 17', 69'; Hadin (yellow card) 45+1'; Nik Akif (yellow card) 53'; Rahmat 90+3' | Report | Marcus 3', (yellow card) 20'; Fadi (yellow card) 23' (yellow-red card) 40'; Azmi 28'; Norfiqrie (yellow card) 83' | Stadium: City Stadium; Attendance: 1,224; Referee: Mohd Nafeez Abd Wahab |

| 18 April 2023 9 | Penang | 2–0 | Kelantan United | Georgetown, Penang |
| 22:00 UTC+8 | Azmeer (yellow card) 13'; Nik Akif 48'; Rafael 58'; Khairul (yellow card) 80' | Report | Ariff (yellow card) 31'; Fandi (yellow card) 69' | Stadium: City Stadium; Attendance: 1,630; Referee: Suhaizi Shukri |

| 28 April 2023 10 | Penang | 2–1 | Kuching City | Georgetown, Penang |
| 21:00 UTC+8 | Khairul 45'; Saad 51', (yellow card) 78' | Report | Kamara (yellow card) 23', (goal) 32'; Alif (yellow card) 53'; Jovanović (yellow card) 75'; Adam (yellow card) 81' | Stadium: City Stadium; Attendance: 1,783; Referee: Mohamad Faizudin Bin Ismail |

| 20 May 2023 11 | Sri Pahang | 1–0 | Penang | Kuantan, Pahang |
| 17:15 UTC+8 | Sherman 48' (pen.); Fadhli (yellow card) 54'; Baqiuddin (yellow card) 78' | Report | Fané (yellow card) 38'; Nik Akif (yellow card) 85' | Stadium: Darul Makmur Stadium; Attendance: 3,196; Referee: Mohd Hasrol Bin Mohd Amir |

| 24 May 2023 12 | Terengganu | 1–0 | Penang | Kuala Nerus, Terengganu |
| 21:00 UTC+8 | Shakir 74' | Report | Fané (yellow card) 36' | Stadium: Sultan Mizan Zainal Abidin Stadium; Attendance: 3,300; Referee: Mohd Fusser Bin Mad Sallih |

| 4 June 2023 13 | Penang | 0–2 | Johor Darul Ta'zim | Georgetown, Penang |
| 21:00 UTC+8 | Zahril (yellow card) 8'; Rafael (yellow card) 45+1'; Namathevan (yellow card) 81'; Azmeer (yellow card) 84' | Report | Leandro (yellow card) 17'; Corbin-Ong 19'; Afiq (yellow card) 45'; Bergson (yellow card) 45+1'; Hong Wan (yellow card) 78'; Forestieri 85'; Juan (yellow card) 87' | Stadium: City Stadium; Attendance: 6,051; Referee: Suhaizi Shukri |

| 8 June 2023 14 | Penang | 1–1 | Kuala Lumpur City | Georgetown, Penang |
| 21:00 UTC+8 | Zahril (yellow card) 36'; Gomes 45+1'; Adib (yellow card) 47'; Rahmat (yellow card) 90+3' (yellow-red card) 90+5' | Report | Tchétché 7'; Kenny (yellow card) 20'; Zhafri (yellow card) 45+3'; Avanzini (yellow card) 77'; Gallifuoco (red card) 79'; Lambert (yellow card) 90+5' | Stadium: City Stadium; Attendance: 1,455; Referee: Mohammad Zamzaidi Bin Katimin |

| 27 June 2023 15 | Negeri Sembilan | 1–1 | Penang | Paroi, Negeri Sembilan |
| 21:00 UTC+8 | Filemon (yellow card) 25'; Tommy 88', (yellow card) 90+1' | Report | Gomes (yellow card) 49' | Stadium: Tuanku Abdul Rahman Stadium; Attendance: 998; Referee: Abang Azharudin Abdullah |

| 8 July 2023 16 | Penang | 4–3 | Kelantan | Georgetown, Penang |
| 21:00 UTC+8 | Hadin 19', 38'; Rafael 41'; Faris (yellow card) 73'; Alif 83' | Report | Harith 10', 46'; Arip (yellow card) 38'; Natanael 45+3'; Afzal (yellow card) 48' | Stadium: City Stadium; Attendance: 1,395; Referee: Mohd Nafeez Abd Wahab |

| 16 July 2023 17 | Selangor | 3–0 | Penang | Petaling Jaya, Selangor |
| 21:00 UTC+8 | Al-Rawabdeh 29'; Alex (yellow card) 39'; Khuzaimi (yellow card) 42'; Boakye 59'; Faisal 79'; Safuwan (yellow card) 82' | Report | Nik Akif (yellow card) 61' | Stadium: Petaling Jaya Stadium; Attendance: 6,245; Referee: Ahmad Zuhadi Dzulkifli |

| 30 July 2023 18 | Penang | 1–2 | Sabah | Georgetown, Penang |
| 21:00 UTC+8 | Irfan 9'; Ting (yellow card) 30'; Ramon 45+1'; Gary (yellow card) 59' | Report | Hadin (yellow card) 41'; Fané (yellow card) 59'; Alif 76'; Haziq (yellow card) 79' | Stadium: City Stadium; Attendance: 2,434; Referee: Kamil Zakaria |

| 11 August 2023 19 | Perak | 3–1 | Penang | Ipoh, Perak |
| 21:00 UTC+8 | Guaycochea 5'; Zack 23'; Afolabi (yellow card) 37'; Seo 75' | Report | Alif 74'; Haziq (yellow card) 84'; Faris (yellow card) 85' | Stadium: Perak Stadium; Attendance: 3,864; Referee: Mohd Hasrol Bin Mohd Amir |

| 22 August 2023 20 | Penang | 1–2 | Kedah Darul Aman | Georgetown, Penang |
| 21:00 UTC+8 | Abdeen (yellow card) 28'; Saad 32'; Adib (yellow card) 38' (yellow-red card) 77'; Zaw (yellow card) 53'; Kogi (yellow card) 70' | Report | Fadzrul 7'; Moses (yellow card) 36', (goal) 90+5'; Hidalgo (yellow card) 38'; Ariff (yellow card) 70' | Stadium: City Stadium; Attendance: 2,924; Referee: S. Logeswaran |

| 27 August 2023 21 | PDRM | 3–0 | Penang | Petaling Jaya, Selangor |
| 17:15 UTC+8 | James (yellow card) 9', (goal) 75'; Aliff (yellow card) 25'; Fané 36' (o.g.); Fadi (yellow card) 60'; Bruno 90+3' | Report | Haziq (yellow card) 18'; Zaw (yellow card) 64' | Stadium: Petaling Jaya Stadium; Attendance: 160; Referee: Tuan Mohd Yaasin Bin Tuan Mohd Hanafiah |

| 1 October 2023 22 | Kelantan United | 1–0 | Penang | Kota Bahru, Kelantan |
| 21:00 UTC+8 | Dominik 67', (yellow card) 87' | Report | Faris (yellow card) 61' | Stadium: Sultan Muhammad IV Stadium; Attendance: 351; Referee: Muhammad Shukor Bin Zulkiflee |

| 28 October 2023 23 | Kuching City | 0–0 | Penang | Kuching, Sarawak |
| 20:15 UTC+8 | Azri (yellow card) 19' | Report | Azrie (yellow card) 62' | Stadium: Sarawak Stadium; Attendance: 387; Referee: Fitri Bin Maskon |

| 26 November 2023 24 | Penang | 3-2 | Sri Pahang | Georgetown, Penang |
| 17:30 UTC+8 | Abdeen 25', 64'; Izzat 70', (yellow card) 71' | Report | Rafael 20'; Fadhli (yellow card) 42'; Syazwan 62' | Stadium: City Stadium; Attendance: 927; Referee: Suhaizi Shukri |

| 5 December 2023 25 | Penang | 1–1 | Terengganu | Georgetown, Penang |
| 20:15 UTC+8 | Fairuz (yellow card) 45+5'; Khairul (yellow card) 83'; Rafael 90+10' (pen.), (yellow card) 90+10' | Report | Shahrul (yellow card) 15'; Azam (yellow card) 55'; Syahmi 66' | Stadium: City Stadium; Attendance: 1,348; Referee: Mohd Fairuzi Bin Mat Desa |

| 16 December 2023 26 | Johor Darul Ta'zim | 8–0 | Penang | Iskandar Puteri, Johor |
| 17:30 UTC+8 | Arif 5', 47', 52', 90+6' (pen.); Bergson 17', 33' (pen.); Akhyar 41'; Heberty 43', (yellow card) 59'; Matthew (yellow card) 64'; Feroz (yellow card) 79' | Report | Aikmal (yellow card) 27'; Namathevan (yellow card) 39'; Khairul (yellow card) 49'; Adib (yellow card) 85'; Abdeen (yellow card) 86' | Stadium: Sultan Ibrahim Stadium; Attendance: 33,169; Referee: Khirulazuan Kidam |

=== Malaysia FA Cup ===
| 8 March 2023 First round | Kedah | 2–2 (3–4 p) | Penang | Alor Setar, Kedah |
| 21:00 UTC+8 | Lira (yellow card) 5'; Ott 9', 90', (yellow card) 70'; Juraboev (yellow card) 38'; Lee Tuck (yellow card) 43' | Report | Rafael (yellow card) 5'; Gomes 22'; Saad 68'; Adriano (yellow card) 76' | Stadium: Darul Aman Stadium; Attendance: 13,768; Referee: Razlan Joffri Ali; Man of the Match: Shafiq Afifi |
| | Penalties |
| | Hidalgo (penalty scored); Balotelli (penalty scored); Lee Tuck (penalty missed); Juraboev (penalty scored); Ciger (penalty missed) | | Zaw (penalty scored); Rafael (penalty scored); Hadin (penalty scored); Faris (penalty scored) |

| 15 April 2023 Second round | Kuching City | 0–4 | Penang | Kuching, Sarawak |
| 21:15 UTC+8 | Rafiezan (yellow card) 13'; Adam (yellow card) 81' | Report | Saad 10'; Rafael 48'; Hadin 65'; Asnan (yellow card) 82'; Gomes 90+5' | Stadium: Sarawak State Stadium; Attendance: 315; Referee: Muhammad Nasruddin B Muhammad Tamrin |

| 28 May 2023 Quarter-finals | Johor Darul Ta'zim | 5–0 | Penang | Iskandar Puteri, Johor |
| 20:15 UTC+8 | Fané 32' (o.g.); Amat 38'; Arif 49' (pen.); Endrick (yellow card) 51'; Corbin-Ong 58', (yellow card) 63'; Syafiq 90+2' | Report | Faris (yellow card) 50'; Asnan (yellow card) 87' | Stadium: Sultan Ibrahim Stadium; Attendance: 14,779; Referee: Ahmas Zuhadi Dzulkifli |

=== Malaysia Cup ===
| 3 August 2023 Round of 16 1st leg | Penang | 0–4 | Kuala Lumpur City | Georgetown, Penang |
| 21:00 UTC+8 | Fané (yellow card) 35'; Rafael (yellow card) 38'; Namathevan (yellow card) 86' | Report | Tchétché 4', 26'; Zhafri 31'; Avanzini (yellow card) 55'; Kevin (yellow card) 72'; Lambert (yellow card) 82'; Romel 84'; Haqimi (yellow card) 86' | Stadium: City Stadium; Attendance: 1,201; Referee: Mohammad Zamzaidi Bin Katimin |

| 18 August 2023 Round of 16 2nd leg | Kuala Lumpur City | 1–0 (5–0 agg.) | Penang | Cheras, Kuala Lumpur |
| 20:15 UTC+8 | Gallifuoco (red card) 15'; Avanzini (yellow card) 43'; Akram (yellow card) 55'; Tchétché 70' | Report | Adib (yellow card) 32'; Haziq (yellow card) 45+2'; Abdeen (yellow card) 55' | Stadium: KLFA Stadium; Attendance: 570; Referee: Mohd Fusser Bin Mad Sallih |

=== MFL Challenge Cup ===
| 19 September 2023 Quarter-finals 1st leg | Penang | 2–1 | Harini F.C. | Georgetown, Penang |
| 21:00 UTC+8 | Khairul (yellow card) 27'; Hadin 85'; Saad 90+5'; Rafael (yellow card) 90+5' | Report | Reuben (yellow card) 30'; Durrkeswaran (yellow card) 39'; Fikri 85'; Kugan (yellow card) 88' | Stadium: City Stadium; Attendance: 435; Referee: Mohd Fairuzi Bin Mat Desa |

| 6 October 2023 Quarter-finals 2nd leg | Harini F.C. | 2–3 (3–5 agg.) | Penang | Selayang, Selangor |
| 21:00 UTC+8 | Badrul 5'; Khyril 90+4'; Prabakaran (yellow card) 120' | Report | Alif (yellow card) 42', (goal) 101'; Rafael 50'; Khairul (yellow card) 62'; Asnan (yellow card) 64'; Azfar (yellow card) 83'; Adib (yellow card) 87'; Saad 118' | Stadium: Selayang Municipal Council Stadium; Attendance: 350; Referee: Amiruddin Lantji |

| 21 October 2023 Semi-finals 1st leg | Penang | 1–2 | PDRM | Georgetown, Penang |
| 17:15 UTC+8 | Adriano 61' | Report | Amir 19'; Fakhrul 76' | Stadium: City Stadium; Attendance: 212; Referee: Abang Azharudin Abdullah |

| 5 November 2023 Semi-finals 2nd leg | PDRM | 2–0 (4–1 agg.) | Penang | Petaling Jaya, Selangor |
| 21:00 UTC+8 | Agba 59', 82'; Fakhrul (yellow card) 63' | Report | Khairul (yellow card) 72'; Azmeer (yellow card) 80'; Kogi (yellow card) 90' | Stadium: Petaling Jaya Stadium; Attendance: 474; Referee: Muhammad Usaid Bin Jamal |

== Statistics ==
=== Appearances and goals ===
| No. | Pos. | Name | League | | FA Cup | | Malaysia Cup | | Challenge Cup | | Total | | Discipline | |
| No. | Pos. | Name | Apps | Goals | Apps | Goals | Apps | Goals | Apps | Goals | Apps | Goals | Yellow card | Red card |
|---|---|---|---|---|---|---|---|---|---|---|---|---|---|---|
| 1 | GK | (Malaysia) Azfar Arif | 15(1) | 0 | 2 | 0 | 1 | 0 | 3 | 0 | 21(1) | 0 | 0 | 0 |
| 2 | DF | (Malaysia) Haziq Puad | 4(1) | 0 | 0 | 0 | 2 | 0 | 0(1) | 0 | 6(2) | 0 | 4 | 0 |
| 3 | DF | (Myanmar) Zaw Min Tun | 14(4) | 0 | 1(1) | 0 | 1(1) | 0 | 3 | 0 | 19(6) | 0 | 3 | 0 |
| 6 | DF | (Malaysia) Khairul Akmal | 9(3) | 1 | 2(1) | 0 | 0 | 0 | 3 | 0 | 14(4) | 1 | 6 | 0 |
| 7 | FW | (Lebanon) Soony Saad | 18(1) | 6 | 3 | 2 | 1 | 0 | 3 | 2 | 25(1) | 10 | 1 | 1 |
| 8 | MF | (Malaysia) Asnan Ahmad | 12(7) | 0 | 1(2) | 0 | 1 | 0 | 2 | 0 | 16(9) | 0 | 3 | 0 |
| 9 | FW | (Malaysia) Kogileswaran Raj | 2(4) | 0 | 0 | 0 | 1(1) | 0 | 3(1) | 0 | 5(6) | 0 | 2 | 0 |
| 10 | FW | (Brazil) Adriano | 17(6) | 1 | 3 | 0 | 1(1) | 0 | 3 | 1 | 24(7) | 1 | 1 | 0 |
| 11 | MF | (Malaysia) Amer Azahar | 3(6) | 0 | 0 | 0 | 0 | 0 | 0(2) | 0 | 3(8) | 0 | 0 | 0 |
| 12 | DF | (Malaysia) Danish Haziq | 0 | 0 | 0 | 0 | 0 | 0 | 0 | 0 | 0 | 0 | 0 | 0 |
| 15 | DF | (Malaysia) Fairuz Zakaria | 3 | 0 | 0(1) | 0 | 0 | 0 | 1(1) | 0 | 4(2) | 0 | 0 | 0 |
| 17 | DF | (Brazil) Rafael Vitor | 25 | 4 | 3 | 1 | 1(1) | 0 | 4 | 1 | 33(1) | 6 | 6 | 0 |
| 18 | FW | (Malaysia) Marcus Mah | 0 | 0 | 0 | 0 | 0 | 0 | 0 | 0 | 0 | 0 | 0 | 0 |
| 19 | MF | (Malaysia) Al-Hafiz Harun | 5(2) | 0 | 0 | 0 | 1(1) | 0 | 4 | 0 | 10(3) | 0 | 0 | 0 |
| 20 | FW | (Malaysia) Rahmat Makasuf | 9(10) | 1 | 1(2) | 0 | 0(2) | 0 | 0 | 0 | 10(14) | 0 | 3 | 1 |
| 21 | DF | (Japan) Ryu Yamaguchi | 1 | 0 | 0 | 0 | 0 | 0 | 0 | 0 | 1 | 0 | 0 | 0 |
| 22 | GK | (Malaysia) Khatul Anuar | 1 | 0 | 0 | 0 | 1 | 0 | 0 | 0 | 2 | 0 | 1 | 0 |
| 25 | GK | (Malaysia) Shafiq Afifi | 8 | 0 | 1 | 0 | 0 | 0 | 1 | 0 | 10 | 0 | 0 | 0 |
| 26 | DF | (Malaysia) Namathevan Arunasalam | 13(7) | 0 | 2(1) | 0 | 1 | 0 | 0(2) | 0 | 16(10) | 0 | 5 | 1 |
| 27 | MF | (Malaysia) Hadin Azman | 9(8) | 3 | 2(1) | 1 | 1 | 0 | 0(1) | 1 | 12(10) | 5 | 2 | 0 |
| 28 | MF | (France) Ousmane Fane | 16(1) | 0 | 1(1) | 0 | 2 | 0 | 1(3) | 0 | 20(5) | 0 | 5 | 0 |
| 29 | DF | (Malaysia) Faris Shah Rosli | 19(1) | 0 | 2(1) | 0 | 1 | 0 | 3(1) | 0 | 25(3) | 0 | 6 | 0 |
| 30 | MF | (Malaysia) Shafi Azswad (Note: U23 player) | 0(2) | 0 | 0 | 0 | 0 | 0 | 0 | 0 | 0(2) | 0 | 0 | 0 |
| 31 | DF | (Malaysia) Aikmal Roslan | 1(1) | 0 | 0 | 0 | 0 | 0 | 0 | 0 | 1(1) | 0 | 1 | 0 |
| 32 | MF | (Malaysia) Nur Izzat Che Awang | 1(1) | 0 | 0(1) | 0 | 0 | 0 | 0 | 0 | 1(2) | 0 | 0 | 0 |
| 33 | MF | (Malaysia) Nik Akif | 18(5) | 2 | 2(1) | 0 | 2 | 0 | 0(1) | 0 | 22(7) | 2 | 3 | 0 |
| 37 | DF | (Malaysia) Azmeer Aris | 13(8) | 0 | 2(1) | 0 | 0(1) | 0 | 0(3) | 0 | 15(13) | 0 | 3 | 0 |
| 46 | DF | (Malaysia) Adib Raop | 15(6) | 0 | 2 | 0 | 2 | 0 | 3(1) | 0 | 21(7) | 0 | 5 | 1 |
| 66 | MF | (Malaysia) Zahril Azri | 4(8) | 0 | 1(1) | 0 | 0 | 0 | 0 | 0 | 5(9) | 0 | 2 | 0 |
| 68 | DF | (Malaysia) Iman Rafaei | 2 | 0 | 0 | 0 | 0 | 0 | 0 | 0 | 2 | 0 | 0 | 0 |
| 71 | MF | (Malaysia) Haziq Kutty Abba | 2(1) | 0 | 0 | 0 | 0 | 0 | 4 | 0 | 6(1) | 0 | 0 | 0 |
| 72 | FW | (Republic of Ireland) Abdul Abdeen Temitope | 8 | 2 | 0 | 0 | 2 | 0 | 0(2) | 0 | 10(2) | 2 | 3 | 0 |
| 80 | MF | (Malaysia) Izzat Zikri | 3 | 1 | 0 | 0 | 0 | 0 | 0 | 0 | 3 | 1 | 1 | 0 |
| 82 | MF | (Malaysia) Azrie Reza | 3(1) | 0 | 0 | 0 | 0 | 0 | 1 | 0 | 4(1) | 0 | 1 | 0 |
| 88 | GK | (Malaysia) Haziq Mukriz | 2 | 0 | 0 | 0 | 0 | 0 | 0 | 0 | 2 | 0 | 0 | 0 |
| 99 | FW | (Malaysia) Alif Ikmalrizal | 2(11) | 3 | 0 | 0 | 0(1) | 0 | 4 | 1 | 6(12) | 4 | 1 | 0 |
Left club during season
| 4 | DF | (South Korea) An Sae-hee | 1 | 0 | 0 | 0 | 0 | 0 | 0 | 0 | 1 | 0 | 0 | 0 |
| 9 | FW | (Brazil) Giovane Gomes | 8(5) | 4 | 2(1) | 2 | 0 | 0 | 0 | 0 | 10(6) | 6 | 1 | 0 |
| 19 | FW | (Philippines) Curt Dizon | 1 | 0 | 0 | 0 | 0 | 0 | 0 | 0 | 1 | 0 | 0 | 0 |
| 23 | MF | (Malaysia) Faizat Ghazli | 0(1) | 0 | 0 | 0 | 0 | 0 | 0 | 0 | 0(1) | 0 | 0 | 0 |
| 88 | GK | (Malaysia) Rendy Rining | 0 | 0 | 0 | 0 | 0 | 0 | 0 | 0 | 0 | 0 | 0 | 0 |

Last updated: 18 December 2023.
Source: Soccerway

=== Top scorers ===
The list is sorted by shirt number when total goals are equal.

| Rnk | Pos | No. | Player | League | FA Cup | Malaysia Cup | Challenge Cup | Total |
|---|---|---|---|---|---|---|---|---|
| 1 | FW | 7 | (Lebanon) Soony Saad | 6 | 2 | 0 | 2 | 10 |
| 2 | FW | 9 | (Brazil) Giovane Gomes | 4 | 2 | 0 | 0 | 6 |
| 3 | DF | 17 | (Brazil) Rafael Vitor | 4 | 1 | 0 | 1 | 6 |
| 4 | MF | 27 | (Malaysia) Hadin Azman | 3 | 1 | 0 | 1 | 5 |
| 5 | FW | 99 | (Malaysia) Alif Ikmalrizal | 3 | 0 | 0 | 1 | 4 |
| 6 | FW | 10 | (Brazil) Adriano | 1 | 0 | 0 | 1 | 2 |
| 6 | MF | 33 | (Malaysia) Nik Akif | 2 | 0 | 0 | 0 | 2 |
| 6 | FW | 72 | (Republic of Ireland) Abdul Abdeen Temitope | 2 | 0 | 0 | 0 | 2 |
| 7 | DF | 6 | (Malaysia) Khairul Akmal Rokisham | 1 | 0 | 0 | 0 | 1 |
| 7 | FW | 20 | (Malaysia) Rahmat Makasuf | 1 | 0 | 0 | 0 | 1 |
| 7 | MF | 80 | (Malaysia) Izzat Zikri | 1 | 0 | 0 | 0 | 1 |

Last updated: 5 December 2023.
Source: Soccerway

=== Top assists ===
An assist is credited to a player for passing or crossing the ball to the scorer, a player whose shot rebounds (off a defender, goalkeeper or goalpost) to a teammate who scores, and a player who wins a penalty kick or a free kick for another player to convert.

The list is sorted by shirt number when total goals are equal.

| Rnk | Pos | No. | Player | League | FA Cup | Malaysia Cup | Challenge Cup | Total |
|---|---|---|---|---|---|---|---|---|
| 1 | MF | 10 | (Brazil) Adriano | 3 | 1 | 0 | 0 | 4 |
| 1 | MF | 33 | (Malaysia) Nik Akif | 3 | 1 | 0 | 0 | 4 |
| 2 | MF | 27 | (Malaysia) Hadin Azman | 3 | 0 | 0 | 0 | 3 |
| 2 | DF | 29 | (Malaysia) Faris Shah Rosli | 1 | 1 | 0 | 1 | 3 |
| 2 | DF | 46 | (Malaysia) Adib Raop | 2 | 0 | 0 | 1 | 3 |
| 3 | DF | 26 | (Malaysia) Namathevan Arunasalam | 1 | 1 | 0 | 0 | 2 |
| 4 | FW | 9 | (Malaysia) Kogileswaran Raj | 0 | 0 | 0 | 1 | 1 |
| 4 | MF | 19 | (Malaysia) Al-Hafiz Harun | 1 | 0 | 0 | 0 | 1 |
| 4 | FW | 20 | (Malaysia) Rahmat Makasuf | 1 | 0 | 0 | 0 | 1 |
| 4 | MF | 23 | (Malaysia) Faizat Ghazli | 1 | 0 | 0 | 0 | 1 |

Last updated: 1 December 2023.
Source: Soccerway

=== Clean sheets ===
The list is sorted by shirt number when total clean sheets are equal.

| Rnk | No. | Player | League | FA Cup | Malaysia Cup | Total |
|---|---|---|---|---|---|---|
| 1 | 1 | (Malaysia) Azfar Arif | 1 | 1 | 0 | 2 |
| 1 | 25 | (Malaysia) Shafiq Afifi | 2 | 0 | 0 | 2 |

=== Summary ===
| Games played | 35 (26 Malaysia Super League), (3 Malaysia FA Cup), (2 Malaysia Cup), (4 MFL Challenge Cup) |
| Games won | 10 (6 Malaysia Super League), (2 Malaysia FA Cup), (0 Malaysia Cup), (2 MFL Challenge Cup) |
| Games drawn | 6 (6 Malaysia Super League), (0 Malaysia FA Cup), (0 Malaysia Cup), (0 MFL Challenge Cup) |
| Games lost | 19 (14 Malaysia Super League), (1 Malaysia FA Cup), (2 Malaysia Cup), (2 MFL Challenge Cup) |
| Goals scored | 41 (29 Malaysia Super League), (6 Malaysia FA Cup), (0 Malaysia Cup), (6 MFL Challenge Cup) |
| Goals conceded | 69 (50 Malaysia Super League), (7 Malaysia FA Cup), (5 Malaysia Cup), (7 MFL Challenge Cup) |
| Goal difference | -28 (-21 Malaysia Super League), (-1 Malaysia FA Cup), (-5 Malaysia Cup), (-1 MFL Challenge Cup) |
| Clean sheets | 4 (3 Malaysia Super League), (1 Malaysia FA Cup), (0 Malaysia Cup), (0 MFL Challenge Cup) |
| Yellow cards | 71 (50 Malaysia Super League) (5 Malaysia FA Cup), (6 Malaysia Cup), (10 MFL Challenge Cup) |
| Red cards | 4 (4 Malaysia Super League) |
| Most appearances | Rafael Vitor (34 appearances) |
| Top scorer | Soony Saad (10 goals) |
| Winning Percentage | Overall: 10/35 (28.57%) |

Last updated: 18 December 2023.
Source: Soccerway
