= 2021 Penang F.C. season =

Penang
2021 season
- Chairman: Soon Lip Chee
- Head coach: Tomáš Trucha
- Stadium: City Stadium
- Super League: 3rd
- Malaysia Cup: Group stage
- Top goalscorer: League: Casagrande (12); All: Casagrande (12)
- Highest home attendance: 2,000 (vs. Sabah, 11 April 2021, Super League) & (vs. Johor Darul Ta'zim, 8 May 2021, Super League)
- Lowest home attendance: 1,917 (vs. Sri Pahang, 24 April 2021, Super League)
- Average home league attendance: 1,972
- Biggest win: 3–0 (vs. Sri Pahang, 24 April 2021, Super League), 4–1 (vs. Terengganu, 1 May 2021, Super League), 3–0 (vs. Sabah, 22 August 2021, Super League)
- Biggest defeat: 0–5 (vs. Sri Pahang, 3 November 2021, Malaysia Cup)
Home colours	Away colours	Third colours

The 2021 season was Penang's 95th competitive season, 1st season in the first tier of Malaysian football since promoted in 2020, 100th year in existence as a football club, and the 1st year since rebranded as Penang Football Club. The season covers the period from 1 December 2020 to 30 November 2021.

== Coaching Staffs ==
Position	Name
Head Coach	(Czech Republic) Tomáš Trucha
Assistant Head Coach	(Malaysia) Manzoor Azwira (Malaysia) Akmal Rizal Ahmad Rakhli
Assistant Coach	(Malaysia) Mat Saiful Mohamad
Goalkeeping Coach	(Malaysia) Mohd Hisham Jainudin
Fitness Coach	(Malaysia) Zahidibudiman Ibrahim
Assistant Fitness Coach	(Malaysia) Rozy Abdul Majid
Team Doctor	(Malaysia) Hardeep Singh Jaginder Singh (Malaysia) Parmjit Singh Kuldip Singh
Physiotherapist	(Malaysia) Izzul Naim Jamil
Kit Man	(Malaysia) Sufie Noorazizan
U-21 Team Head Coach	(Malaysia) Wan Rohaimi
U-19 Team Head Coach	(Malaysia) K. Mahendran

== Squad ==
As of 25 May 2021

Squad No.	Name	Nationality	Position(s)	Date of Birth (Age)
Goalkeepers
1	Samuel Somerville	(Malaysia) (England)	GK	1 March 1994 (age 32)
22	Asyraaf Omar	(Malaysia)	GK	12 September 1994 (age 32)
25	Shafiq Afifi U22	(Malaysia)	GK	6 August 1999 (age 27)
88	See Tian Keat	(Malaysia)	GK	22 June 1993 (age 33)
Defenders
2	Quentin Cheng U22	(Malaysia)	RB / RW	20 November 1999 (age 26)
3	Syazwan Zaipol	(Malaysia)	CB	24 February 1995 (age 31)
4	Ryuji Utomo FP	(Indonesia)	CB / DM	1 July 1995 (age 31)
5	Fauzan Fauzi	(Malaysia)	RB	7 January 1995 (age 31)
6	Khairul Akmal	(Malaysia)	RB / CB / DM	28 May 1998 (age 28)
13	Latiff Suhaimi	(Malaysia)	CB / DM / CF	29 May 1989 (age 37)
15	Khairul Asyraf	(Malaysia)	RB	31 December 1994 (age 31)
17	Rafael Vitor FP	(Brazil)	CB / DM	5 January 1993 (age 33)
23	Azwan Aripin	(Malaysia)	LB	21 April 1996 (age 30)
33	Azmi Muslim	(Malaysia)	LB / LW	17 October 1986 (age 40)
37	Azmeer Aris U22	(Malaysia)	LB / LW	5 August 1999 (age 27)
77	Suwarnaraj Chinniah	(Malaysia)	RB	3 February 1998 (age 28)
Midfielders
8	Khairu Azrin	(Malaysia)	DM / CM	13 July 1991 (age 35)
11	Amer Azahar	(Malaysia)	RW / LW	22 June 1995 (age 31)
12	Al-Hafiz Harun	(Malaysia)	RW / LW	13 April 1994 (age 32)
14	Endrick FP	(Brazil)	AM / CM / CF	7 March 1995 (age 31)
16	Danial Ashraf	(Malaysia)	AM	8 January 1997 (age 29)
28	Wan Faiz	(Malaysia)	AM / RW / LW	11 July 1992 (age 34)
31	Afif Azman	(Malaysia)	AM / RW	1 August 1998 (age 28)
36	Fadhil Idris	(Malaysia)	DM / CM	29 July 1996 (age 30)
55	David Rowley	(Malaysia) (England) (Australia)	DM / AM / RW / LW	6 February 1990 (age 36)
70	D. Saarvindran	(Malaysia)	AM / RW / LW	4 October 1992 (age 34)
Strikers
7	Jafri Chew	(Malaysia)	CF	11 June 1997 (age 29)
9	Casagrande FP	(Brazil)	CF	28 July 1986 (age 40)
10	Sheriddin Boboev FP U22	(Tajikistan)	CF / AM / RW	21 April 1999 (age 27)
18	Marcus Mah	(Malaysia)	CF / RW / LW	2 April 1994 (age 32)
21	Azim Rahim	(Malaysia)	CF	1 January 1997 (age 29)

- FP = Foreign player
- U22 = Under-22 player

== Transfers and contracts ==
=== In ===
==== 1st Transfer Window ====
No.	Pos.	Name	Age	Moving from	Type	Transfer Date	Transfer fee
4	DF	(Indonesia) Ryuji Utomo	31	(Indonesia) Persija Jakarta	Loan	1 December 2020	Free
7	FW	(Malaysia) Jafri Chew	29	Free Agent	Transfer	7 December 2020	Free
77	DF	(Malaysia) C. Suwarnaraj	28	(Malaysia) Perak II	Transfer	7 December 2020	Free
10	FW	(Tajikistan) Sheriddin Boboev	27	(Tajikistan) Istiklol	Transfer	12 December 2020	Free
2	DF	(Malaysia) Quentin Cheng	26	(Malaysia) Selangor II	Loan	16 December 2020	Free
16	MF	(Malaysia) Danial Ashraf	29	(Malaysia) Kelantan	Transfer	16 December 2020	Free
23	DF	(Malaysia) Azwan Aripin	30	(Malaysia) Kelantan	Transfer	16 December 2020	Free
15	DF	(Malaysia) Khairul Asyraf	31	(Malaysia) Kelantan	Transfer	16 December 2020	Free
36	MF	(Malaysia) Fadhil Idris	30	(Malaysia) FELDA United	Transfer	17 December 2020	Free
88	GK	(Malaysia) See Tian Keat	33	(Malaysia) The Cops	Transfer	18 December 2020	Free
25	GK	(Malaysia) Shafiq Afifi	27	(Malaysia) Perak II	Transfer	19 December 2020	Free
70	MF	(Malaysia) D. Saarvindran	34	(Malaysia) Terengganu	Transfer	9 January 2021	Free
99	FW	(Malaysia) Zafuan Azeman	27	Free Agent	Transfer	10 January 2021	Free
55	MF	(Malaysia) David Rowley	36	(Malaysia) Kedah Darul Aman	Transfer	11 January 2021	Free
3	DF	(Malaysia) Syazwan Zaipol	31	(Malaysia) Petaling Jaya City	Transfer	21 February 2021	Free
22	GK	(Malaysia) Asyraaf Omar	32	(Malaysia) Kuala Lumpur Rovers	Transfer	5 March 2021	Free

==== 2nd Transfer Window ====
No.	Pos.	Name	Age	Moving from	Type	Transfer Date	Transfer fee
21	FW	(Malaysia) Azim Rahim	29	(Malaysia) Kuala Lumpur City	Loan	25 May 2021	Free
5	DF	(Malaysia) Fauzan Fauzi	31	(Malaysia) Kuala Lumpur City	Loan	25 May 2021	Free

=== Out ===
==== 1st Transfer Window ====
No.	Pos.	Name	Age	Moving to	Type	Transfer Date	Transfer fee
3	DF	(Malaysia) Raffi Nagoorgani	32	(Malaysia) Petaling Jaya City	Released	15 December 2020	Free
7	MF	(Malaysia) Syukur Saidin	35	Free Agent	End of Contract	1 December 2020	Free
10	MF	(South Korea) Lee Chang-hoon	39	(Malaysia) Sarawak United	Released	23 December 2020	Free
15	DF	(Malaysia) Fairuz Zakaria	29	(Malaysia) Kedah Darul Aman	Released	20 December 2020	Free
16	DF	(Malaysia) Zamri Pin Ramli	35	(Malaysia) Negeri Sembilan	Released	8 January 2021	Free
19	FW	(Malaysia) Nurshamil Ghani	32	(Malaysia) Kelantan	Released	21 February 2021	Free
21	GK	(Malaysia) (Hong Kong) Wong Tse Yang	31	(Malaysia) Immigration	End of Contract	1 December 2020	Free
22	GK	(Malaysia) Ramadhan Hamid	32	(Malaysia) Kelantan United	Released	27 December 2020	Free
23	DF	(Malaysia) Zharif Desa	34	Free Agent	End of Contract	1 December 2020	Free
25	GK	(Malaysia) Hazrull Hafiz	28	Free Agent	End of Contract	1 December 2020	Free
88	DF	(Malaysia) Yoges Muniandy	37	Free Agent	End of Contract	1 December 2020	Free
99	FW	(Malaysia) Bobby Gonzales	42	(Malaysia) Sabah	Released	15 January 2021	Free

==== 2nd Transfer Window ====
No.	Pos.	Name	Age	Moving from	Type	Transfer Date	Transfer fee
99	FW	(Malaysia) Zafuan Azeman	27	(Malaysia) Kelantan United		24 May 2021	
19	MF	(Malaysia) Nurfais Johari	27	(Malaysia) PDRM		24 May 2021	
20	MF	(Malaysia) Azrie Reza	28	(Malaysia) PDRM	Loan	25 May 2021	Free

== Friendlies ==
19 February 2021 Friendly	Kedah Darul Aman	1–1	Penang	Alor Setar, Kedah
00:00 UTC+8	Kipre (?)		Boboev (?)	Stadium: Darulaman Stadium; Attendance: 0

21 February 2021 Friendly	Penang	3–1	Kedah Darul Aman	Batu Kawan, Penang
20:00 UTC+8	Casagrande (?); R. Vitor (?); Azwan (?)		Farhan (?)	Stadium: Penang State Stadium; Attendance: 0

23 February 2021 Friendly	Negeri Sembilan	2–1	Penang	Seremban, Negeri Sembilan
21:00 UTC+8	Akono 84'; Alif 86'		R. Vitor 3'	Stadium: Tuanku Abdul Rahman Stadium; Attendance: 0

28 February 2021 Friendly	Perak	2–1	Penang	Ipoh, Perak
21:00 UTC+8	Guilherme 13'; Careca 32'		Al-Hafiz 85'	Stadium: Perak Stadium; Attendance: 0

5 July 2021 Friendly	Penang	0–2	Perak II	Batu Kawan, Penang
21:00 UTC+8			Seegio 53'; Khairulamizan 81'	Stadium: Batu Kawan Stadium; Attendance: 0

7 July 2021 Friendly	Penang	1–0	PDRM	Batu Kawan, Penang
21:00 UTC+8	Casagrande 33'			Stadium: Batu Kawan Stadium; Attendance: 0

11 July 2021 Friendly	Terengganu	0–2	Penang	Kuala Nerus, Terengganu
21:00 UTC+8			Azim 43' (pen.); Jafri 79' (pen.)	Stadium: Sultan Mizan Zainal Abidin Stadium; Attendance: 0

12 July 2021 Friendly	Terengganu II	2–1	Penang	Kuala Terengganu, Terengganu
21:00 UTC+8	Ridzuan Razali 32'; Hakim 48'		Azwan 80'	Stadium: Sultan Ismail Nasiruddin Shah Stadium; Attendance: 0

14 July 2021 Friendly	Kelantan United	1–2	Penang	Kota Bahru, Kelantan
16:45 UTC+8	Fitri 88' (pen.)		Azwan 56'; Cheng 62'	Stadium: Sultan Muhammad IV Stadium; Attendance: 0

== Competitions ==
=== Malaysia Super League ===
==== League table ====
Pos	Team	Pld	W	D	L	GF	GA	GD	Pts	Qualification or relegation
1	Johor Darul Ta'zim (C)	22	18	3	1	50	9	+41	57	Qualification for AFC Champions League group stage
2	Kedah Darul Aman	22	13	4	5	44	28	+16	43	Qualification for AFC Cup group stage
3	Penang	22	12	5	5	37	30	+7	41	
4	Terengganu	22	11	5	6	33	20	+13	38	
5	Selangor	22	10	6	6	45	30	+15	36	

Source: Malaysian Football League
Rules for classification: 1) Points; 2) Goal difference; 3) Number of goals scored.
(C) Champions

==== Result summary ====
Overall								Home						Away					
Pld	W	D	L	GF	GA	GD	Pts	W	D	L	GF	GA	GD	W	D	L	GF	GA	GD
22	12	5	5	37	30	+7	41	5	4	2	14	10	+4	7	1	3	23	20	+3

Last updated: 12 September 2021.
Source: MFL

==== Results by matchday ====
Matchday	1	2	3	4	5	6	7	8	9	10	11	12	13	14	15	16	17	18	19	20	21	22
Ground	H	A	H	H	A	H	A	H	A	H	A	A	H	A	A	H	A	H	A	H	A	H
Result	W	L	D	D	W	W	W	D	D	W	W	L	L	L	W	L	W	W	W	W	W	D
Position	4	7	8	7	4	4	3	4	4	4	3	4	4	4	4	4	3	3	3	4	3	3

Updated to match(es) played on 12 September 2021. Source: MFL
A = Away; H = Home; W = Win; D = Draw; L = Loss

==== Matches ====
Win Draw Loss

6 March 2021 1	Penang	1–0	Kuala Lumpur City	Georgetown, Penang
21:00 UTC+8	Rowley 29'	Report		Stadium: City Stadium; Attendance: 0 Referee: Hasrol Amir (Kelantan)

9 March 2021 2	Johor Darul Ta'zim	2–0	Penang	Iskandar Puteri, Johor
21:00 UTC+8	Velazquez 81' (pen.); Rodriguez 85'	Report		Stadium: Sultan Ibrahim Stadium; Attendance: 0 Referee: S. Logeswaran

12 March 2021 3	Penang	1–1	Kedah Darul Aman	Georgetown, Penang
21:00 UTC+8	Endrick 11'	Report	Sherman 86'	Stadium: City Stadium; Attendance: 0 Referee: Noor Azriel Baharudin (Selangor)

16 March 2021 4	Penang	0–0	UiTM	Georgetown, Penang
21:00 UTC+8		Report		Stadium: City Stadium; Attendance: 0 Referee: Amirul Izwan Yaacob (Perak)

20 March 2021 5	Selangor	0–2	Penang	Petaling Jaya, Selangor
21:00 UTC+8		Report	Al- Harun 38'; Danial 73'	Stadium: Petaling Jaya Stadium; Attendance: 0 Referee: Nafeez Abdul Wahab (Johor)

3 April 2021 6	Penang	2–1	Perak	Georgetown, Penang
21:00 UTC+8	Casagrande 43'; Rafael 71'	Report	Careca 12'	Stadium: City Stadium; Attendance: 0 Referee: Hamdan Awang (Terengganu)

6 April 2021 7	Melaka United	1–2	Penang	Paya Rumput, Malacca
21:00 UTC+8	Nikolic 62'	Report	Casagrande 39', 49'	Stadium: Hang Jebat Stadium; Attendance: 0 Referee: Tuan Mohd Yaasin (Selangor)

11 April 2021 8	Penang	1–1	Sabah	Georgetown, Penang
21:00 UTC+8	Casagrande 86'	Report	Saddil 52'	Stadium: City Stadium; Attendance: 2,000; Referee: Razlan Joffri Ali (Selangor)

18 April 2021 9	Petaling Jaya City	1–1	Penang	Petaling Jaya, Selangor
22:00 UTC+8	Ruventhiran 39'	Report	Casagrande 48'	Stadium: Petaling Jaya Stadium; Attendance: 230; Referee: Nafeez Abdul Wahab (Johor)

24 April 2021 10	Penang	3–0	Sri Pahang	Georgetown, Penang
22:00 UTC+8	Endrick 11'; Danial 26'; Jafri 90+1'	Report		Stadium: City Stadium; Attendance: 1,917; Referee: Fitri Maskon (Malacca)

1 May 2021 11	Terengganu	1–4	Penang	Kuala Nerus, Terengganu
22:00 UTC+8	Hakimi 60'	Report	Boboev 8'; Endrick 21'; Casagrande 66', 68'	Stadium: Sultan Mizan Zainal Abidin Stadium; Attendance: 5,561; Referee: Suhaizi Shukri (Malacca)

4 May 2021 12	Kuala Lumpur City	3–1	Penang	Cheras, Kuala Lumpur
22:00 UTC+8	Paulo Josué 35', 52', 88'	Report	Danial 64'	Stadium: KLFA Stadium; Attendance: 758; Referee: Zamzaidi Katimin (Malacca)

8 May 2021 13	Penang	0–3	Johor Darul Ta'zim	Georgetown, Penang
22:00 UTC+8		Report	Safawi 15'; Bergson 43'; Sumareh 51'	Stadium: City Stadium; Attendance: 2,000; Referee: Hasrol Amir (Kelantan)

17 August 2021 14 (Rescheduled)	Kedah Darul Aman	4–1	Penang	Alor Setar, Kedah
21:00 UTC+8	Tchétché 17', 38'; Baddrol 23'; Sherman 55'	Report	Rowley 44'	Stadium: Darulaman Stadium; Attendance: 0 Referee: Zamzaidi Katimin (Malacca)

28 July 2021 15	UiTM	0–1	Penang	Shah Alam, Selangor
21:00 UTC+8		Report	Boboev 81'	Stadium: UiTM Stadium; Attendance: 0 Referee: Muhammad Usaid Jamal (Johor)

31 July 2021 16	Penang	1–4	Selangor	Georgetown, Penang
21:00 UTC+8	Rowley 40'	Report	Olusegun 16' (pen.), 90+5'; Danial 49'; Sean 57'	Stadium: City Stadium; Attendance: 0 Referee: Zulkarnain Zakaria (Kuala Lumpur)

3 August 2021 17	Perak	3–5	Penang	Ipoh, Perak
21:00 UTC+8	Poku 15', 36' (pen.), 58' (pen.)	Report	Rafael 1', 8', 28'; Casagrande 21'; Azim 88'	Stadium: Perak Stadium; Attendance: 0 Referee: Suhaimi Mat Hassan (Pahang)

7 August 2021 18	Penang	2–1	Melaka United	Georgetown, Penang
21:00 UTC+8	Rafael 75' (pen.); Boboev 90+3'	Report	Gomes 90'	Stadium: City Stadium; Attendance: 0 Referee: Noor Azriel Baharudin (Selangor)

22 August 2021 19	Sabah	0–3	Penang	Likas, Sabah
20:15 UTC+8		Report	Casagrande 38', 54'; Boboev 67'	Stadium: Likas Stadium; Attendance: 0 Referee: Tuan Mohd Yaasin (Selangor)

29 August 2021 20	Penang	2–1	Petaling Jaya City	Georgetown, Penang
21:00 UTC+8	Casagrande 5'; Boboev 45+1'	Report	Rajes 64'	Stadium: City Stadium; Attendance: 0 Referee: Suhaizi Shukri (Malacca)

5 September 2021 21	Sri Pahang	1–2	Penang	Kuantan, Pahang
21:00 UTC+8	Athiu 61'	Report	Endrick 67'; Danial 72'	Stadium: Darul Makmur Stadium; Attendance: 0 Referee: Khairulsyahmi Ahmad Khalidi

12 September 2021 22	Penang	2–2	Terengganu	Georgetown, Penang
21:00 UTC+8	Boboev 40'; Casagrande 45+1'	Report	Argzim 25'; Lee 80'	Stadium: City Stadium; Attendance: O Referee: Amirul Izwan Yaacob (Perak)

=== Malaysia Cup ===
==== Group stage ====
Pos	Team	Pld	W	D	L	GF	GA	GD	Pts	Qualification	KUL	SUD	PAH	PEN
1	Kuala Lumpur City	6	4	2	0	12	4	+8	14	Quarter-finals	—	4–0	3–1	1–0
2	Sarawak United	6	3	1	2	9	10	−1	10	Quarter-finals	2–2	—	1–0	1–2
3	Sri Pahang	6	2	0	4	11	7	+4	6		0–1	1–2	—	4–0
4	Penang	6	1	1	4	4	15	−11	4		1–1	1–3	0–5	—

Source: MFL, FAM

Win Draw Loss

26 September 2021 1	Penang	1–3	Sarawak United	Georgetown, Penang
21:00 UTC+8	Al-Hafiz 56'	Report	Uche Agba 47', 58'; Khair 54'	Stadium: City Stadium; Attendance: 0 Referee: Hamdan Awang (Terengganu)

29 September 2021 2	Penang	1–1	Kuala Lumpur City	Georgetown, Penang
21:00 UTC+8	Boboev 77'	Report	Morales 90+3'	Stadium: City Stadium; Attendance: 0 Referee: Hasrol Amir (Kelantan)

30 October 2021 3	Sri Pahang	4–0	Penang	Kuantan, Pahang
21:00 UTC+8	Malik 11', 55'; Hidalgo 47'; Abubakar 72'	Report		Stadium: Darul Makmur Stadium; Attendance: 500+ Referee: Razlan Joffri Ali

3 November 2021 4	Penang	0–5	Sri Pahang	Georgetown, Penang
21:00 UTC+8		Report	Athiu 10', 35', 82'; Abubakar 21'; Malik 58'	Stadium: City Stadium; Attendance: 932; Referee: Fairuzi Mat Desa

7 November 2021 5	Kuala Lumpur City	1–0	Penang	Cheras, Kuala Lumpur
21:00 UTC+8	Morales 38'	Report		Stadium: KLFA Stadium; Attendance: 415; Referee: Khiruazuan Kidam

10 November 2021 6	Sarawak United	1–2	Penang	Shah Alam
21:00 UTC+8	Christie 7'	Report	Jafri 12'; Amer 43'	Stadium: UiTM Stadium; Attendance: 105; Referee: Muhammad Nasrudin Muhammad Tamrin

== Statistics ==
=== Appearances and goals ===
No.	Pos.	Name	League		Malaysia Cup		Total		Discipline	
No.	Pos.	Name	Apps	Goals	Apps	Goals	Apps	Goals	Yellow card	Red card
1	GK	(Malaysia) (England) Samuel Somerville	16	0	2	0	18	0	1	0
2	DF	(Malaysia) Quentin Cheng	22	0	1	0	23	0	1	0
3	DF	(Malaysia) Syazwan Zaipol	1	0	0	0	1	0	0	0
4	DF	(Indonesia) Ryuji Utomo	13(2)	0	4	0	17(2)	0	4	0
5	DF	(Malaysia) Fauzan Fauzi	0(2)	0	0(2)	0	0(4)	0	0	0
6	DF	(Malaysia) Khairul Akmal	1(3)	0	5	0	6(3)	0	3	0
7	FW	(Malaysia) Jafri Chew	0(4)	1	1(5)	1	1(9)	2	2	0
8	MF	(Malaysia) Khairu Azrin	16(1)	0	0	0	16(1)	0	6	1
9	FW	(Brazil) Casagrande	19	12	2	0	21	12	6	1
10	FW	(Tajikistan) Sheriddin Boboev	18(4)	6	5	1	23(4)	7	2	0
11	MF	(Malaysia) Amer Azahar	11(6)	0	5(1)	1	16(7)	1	0	0
12	MF	(Malaysia) Al-Hafiz Harun	15(3)	1	5	1	20(3)	2	0	0
13	DF	(Malaysia) Latiff Suhaimi	10(9)	0	5	0	15(9)	0	2	1
14	MF	(Brazil) Endrick	17(1)	4	6	0	23(1)	4	3	0
15	DF	(Malaysia) Khairul Asyraf	1(5)	0	3(1)	0	4(6)	0	1	0
16	MF	(Malaysia) Danial Ashraf	9(10)	4	4(2)	0	13(12)	4	1	0
17	DF	(Brazil) Rafael Vitor	21	5	2(1)	0	23(1)	5	2	0
18	FW	(Malaysia) Marcus Mah	1(3)	0	0(1)	0	1(4)	0	0	0
21	FW	(Malaysia) Azim Rahim	0(6)	1	0(4)	0	0(10)	1	1	0
22	GK	(Malaysia) Asyraaf Omar	0	0	0	0	0	0	0	0
23	DF	(Malaysia) Azwan Aripin	14(3)	0	3	0	17(3)	0	8	0
25	GK	(Malaysia) Shafiq Afifi	0	0	0	0	0	0	0	0
28	MF	(Malaysia) Wan Faiz	0(5)	0	0(3)	0	0(8)	0	1	0
31	MF	(Malaysia) Afif Azman	0	0	0	0	0	0	0	0
33	DF	(Malaysia) Azmi Muslim	4(5)	0	2(2)	0	6(7)	0	1	0
36	MF	(Malaysia) Fadhil Idris	3(4)	0	2(3)	0	5(7)	0	1	0
37	DF	(Malaysia) Azmeer Aris	5(9)	0	1	0	6(9)	0	1	0
55	MF	(Malaysia) (Australia) (England) David Rowley	18(3)	3	4	0	22(3)	3	3	0
70	MF	(Malaysia) D. Saarvindran	1(9)	0	0(3)	0	1(12)	0	2	0
77	DF	(Malaysia) C. Suwarnaraj	0(1)	0	0	0	0(1)	0	0	0
88	GK	(Malaysia) Bryan See	6(1)	0	4	0	10(1)	0	1	0
Left club during season
19	MF	(Malaysia) Nurfais Johari	0	0	0	0	0	0	0	0
20	MF	(Malaysia) Azrie Reza	0	0	0	0	0	0	0	0
99	FW	(Malaysia) Zafuan Azeman	0(3)	0	0	0	0(3)	0	0	0

Last updated: 10 November 2021.
Source: Soccerway

=== Top scorers ===
The list is sorted by shirt number when total goals are equal.

Rnk	Pos	No.	Player	League	Malaysia Cup	Total
1	FW	9	(Brazil) Casagrande	12	0	12
2	FW	10	(Tajikistan) Sheriddin Boboev	6	1	7
3	DF	17	(Brazil) Rafael Vitor	5	0	5
4	MF	14	(Brazil) Endrick	4	0	4
4	MF	16	(Malaysia) Danial Ashraf	4	0	4
6	MF	55	(Malaysia) (Australia) (England) David Rowley	3	0	3
7	MF	12	(Malaysia) Al-Hafiz Harun	1	1	2
8	FW	7	(Malaysia) Jafri Chew	1	0	1
8	FW	21	(Malaysia) Azim Rahim	1	0	1

Last updated: 29 September 2021.
Source: Soccerway

=== Top assists ===
An assist is credited to a player for passing or crossing the ball to the scorer, a player whose shot rebounds (off a defender, goalkeeper or goalpost) to a teammate who scores, and a player who wins a penalty kick or a free kick for another player to convert.

The list is sorted by shirt number when total goals are equal.

Rnk	Pos	No.	Player	League	Malaysia Cup	Total
1	MF	14	(Brazil) Endrick	10	1	11
2	FW	9	(Brazil) Casagrande	6	1	7
3	DF	2	(Malaysia) Quentin Cheng	5	0	5
4	FW	10	(Tajikistan) Sheriddin Boboev	4	0	4
5	DF	17	(Brazil) Rafael Vitor	3	0	3
6	MF	8	(Malaysia) Khairu Azrin	2	0	2
6	MF	11	(Malaysia) Amer Azahar	2	0	2
6	MF	16	(Malaysia) Danial Ashraf	2	0	2
9	MF	12	(Malaysia) Al-Hafiz Harun	1	0	1
9	DF	23	(Malaysia) Azwan Aripin	1	0	1
9	MF	28	(Malaysia) Wan Faiz	1	0	1

Last updated: 29 September 2021.
Source: Soccerway

=== Clean sheets ===
The list is sorted by shirt number when total clean sheets are equal.

Rnk	No.	Player	League	Malaysia Cup	Total
1	1	(Malaysia) (England) Samuel Somerville	5	0	5
2	88	(Malaysia) Bryan See	1	0	1

Last updated: 29 September 2021.
Source: Soccerway

=== Summary ===
Games played	27 (22 Malaysia Super League), (5 Malaysia Cup)
Games won	12 (12 Malaysia Super League)
Games drawn	6 (5 Malaysia Super League), (1 Malaysia Cup)
Games lost	9 (5 Malaysia Super League),(4 Malaysia Cup)
Goals scored	39 (37 Malaysia Super League), (2 Malaysia Cup)
Goals conceded	44 (30 Malaysia Super League), (14 Malaysia Cup)
Goal difference	-5 (+7 Malaysia Super League), (-12 Malaysia Cup)
Clean sheets	6 (6 Malaysia Super League)
Yellow cards	52 (44 Malaysia Super League) (8 Malaysia Cup)
Red cards	3 (3 Malaysia Super League)
Most appearances	Sheriddin Boboev (27 appearances)
Top scorer	Casagrande (12 goals)
Winning Percentage	Overall: 12/27 (50.00%)

Last updated: 7 November 2021.
Source: Soccerway
