= 2022 Penang F.C. season =

Penang
2022 season
- Chairman: Soon Lip Chee
- Head coach: Tomáš Trucha (until 10 May); Manzoor Azwira (interim, until 1 June); Zainal Abidin Hassan (from 1 June to 12 October); Manzoor Azwira (from 12 October)
- Stadium: City Stadium
- Super League: 12th
- Malaysia FA Cup: Semi-finals
- Malaysia Cup: Round of 16
- Top goalscorer: League: Lucas Silva (6); All: Lucas Silva (11)
Home colours	Away colours	Third colours

The 2022 season was Penang's 96th competitive season, 2nd season in the first tier of Malaysian football since promoted in 2020, 101st year in existence as a football club, and the 2nd year since being rebranded as Penang Football Club. The season covers the period from 1 December 2020 to 30 November 2021.

== Players ==
Note: Flags indicate national team as defined under FIFA eligibility rules; some limited exceptions apply. Players may hold more than one non-FIFA nationality.

No.	Pos.	Nation	Player
1	GK	(Malaysia) MAS	Shafiq Afifi
2	DF	(Malaysia) MAS	Ariff Ar-Rasyid
4	MF	(Malaysia) MAS	Sukri Hamid
6	DF	(Malaysia) MAS	Khairul Akmal Rokisham
7	FW	(Brazil) BRA	Lucas Silva
8	MF	(Malaysia) MAS	Danial Ashraf
10	FW	(Lebanon) LBN	Hilal El-Helwe
11	FW	(Malaysia) MAS	Jafri Firdaus Chew
12	FW	(Malaysia) MAS	Azim Rahim
14	MF	(Brazil) BRA	Endrick
15	DF	(Malaysia) MAS	Fairuz Zakaria
16	MF	(Malaysia) MAS	Faiz Mazlan
17	DF	(Brazil) BRA	Rafael Vitor
18	MF	(Malaysia) MAS	Tam Sheang Tsung

No.	Pos.	Nation	Player
19	MF	(Malaysia) MAS	Thivandaran Karnan
20	DF	(Malaysia) MAS	Rafiuddin Roddin
22	GK	(Malaysia) MAS	Khatul Anuar
23	MF	(Malaysia) MAS	Faizat Ghazli
24	DF	(Malaysia) MAS	Syazwan Zaipol
25	MF	(Malaysia) MAS	Azzizan Nordin
26	MF	(Malaysia) MAS	Saravanan Thirumurugan (on loan from Selangor)
28	GK	(Malaysia) MAS	Hafizul Hakim
29	FW	(Malaysia) MAS	Faizal Talib (on loan from Melaka United)
31	MF	(Malaysia) MAS	Faiz Subri
32	DF	(Philippines) PHI	Christian Rontini
44	MF	(Malaysia) MAS	Gopi Rizqi (on loan from Sarawak United)
46	MF	(Malaysia) MAS	Adib Raop
69	DF	(Malaysia) MAS	Aidil Azuan

== Statistics ==
=== Appearances and goals ===
As of 28 January 2023

No.	Pos	Nat	Player	Total		League		FA Cup		Malaysia Cup	
No.	Pos	Nat	Player	Apps	Goals	Apps	Goals	Apps	Goals	Apps	Goals
Goalkeepers:
1	GK	(Malaysia) MAS	Shafiq Afifi	3	0	3	0	0	0	0	0
22	GK	(Malaysia) MAS	Khatul Anuar	12	0	11	0	0	0	1	0
28	GK	(Malaysia) MAS	Hafizul Hakim	16	0	8+4	0	3	0	1	0
Defenders:
2	DF	(Malaysia) MAS	Ariff Ar-Rasyid	21	0	10+7	0	1+1	0	2	0
6	DF	(Malaysia) MAS	Khairul Akmal	17	0	13+1	0	2	0	1	0
15	DF	(Malaysia) MAS	Fairuz Zakaria	21	0	12+5	0	2	0	1+1	0
17	DF	(Brazil) BRA	Rafael Vitor	19	2	15	2	2	0	2	0
20	DF	(Malaysia) MAS	Rafiuddin Roddin	15	0	10+3	0	0+1	0	1	0
32	DF	(Philippines) PHI	Christian Rontini	19	0	11+5	0	1+1	0	0+1	0
33	DF	(Malaysia) MAS	Azmi Muslim	2	0	1	0	1	0	0	0
Midfielders:
4	MF	(Malaysia) MAS	Sukri Hamid	13	1	5+5	1	3	0	0	0
8	MF	(Malaysia) MAS	Danial Ashraf	14	1	3+9	1	1	0	1	0
14	MF	(Brazil) BRA	Endrick	18	1	13+1	1	1+1	0	2	0
16	MF	(Malaysia) MAS	Faiz Mazlan	14	0	4+7	0	0+1	0	0+2	0
18	MF	(Malaysia) MAS	Tam Sheang Tsung	1	0	1	0	0	0	0	0
19	MF	(Malaysia) MAS	Thivandaran Karnan	12	1	3+5	0	1+1	1	0+2	0
23	MF	(Malaysia) MAS	Faizat Ghazli	18	0	15	0	1+1	0	1	0
24	MF	(Malaysia) MAS	Gopi Rizqi	5	0	4	0	1	0	0	0
25	MF	(Malaysia) MAS	Azzizan Nordin	20	0	13+4	0	1	0	1+1	0
26	MF	(Malaysia) MAS	Saravanan Thirumurugan	23	4	11+7	3	3	1	1+1	0
31	MF	(Malaysia) MAS	Faiz Subri	10	0	2+6	0	0+1	0	0+1	0
Forwards:
7	FW	(Brazil) BRA	Lucas Silva	15	11	11	6	2	2	2	3
10	FW	(Lebanon) LBN	Hilal El-Helwe	22	9	17+2	5	3	4	0	0
11	FW	(Malaysia) MAS	Jafri Firdaus Chew	17	0	9+4	0	1+1	0	2	0
12	FW	(Malaysia) MAS	Azim Rahim	15	0	5+9	0	0+1	0	0	0
29	FW	(Malaysia) MAS	Faizal Talib	5	0	0+4	0	0+1	0	0	0
46	FW	(Malaysia) MAS	Adib Raop	22	2	15+2	1	2+1	1	2	0
Players who left during the season but made an appearance
7	MF	(Malaysia) MAS	Alif Romli	1	0	0+1	0	0	0	0	0
9	FW	(Brazil) BRA	Casagrande	6	2	4+1	2	1	0	0	0
13	DF	(Malaysia) MAS	Latiff Suhaimi	9	0	8	0	0+1	0	0	0
24	MF	(Malaysia) MAS	Syazwan Zaipol	4	0	3+1	0	0	0	0	0
27	DF	(Malaysia) MAS	Shafiq Al-Hafiz	5	0	2+2	0	0+1	0	0	0

- Source: Penang FC
