= 2019 Penang FA season =

Penang
2019 season
- President: Dr. Amar Pritpal Abdullah
- Head Coach: Manzoor Azwira
- Stadium: City Stadium
- Malaysia Premier League: 7th
- Malaysia FA Cup: Third round
- Malaysia Cup: Group stage
- Top goalscorer: League: Casagrande; Julián Bottaro (8 goals); All: Julián Bottaro (10 goals)
Home colours	Away colours	Third colours

The 2020 season was Penang's 93rd competitive season, 2nd consecutive season in the second tier of Malaysian football since relegated in 2017, and 98th year in existence as a football club.

== Events ==
On 25 December 2018, Ndumba Makeche joined the club.

On 23 January 2019, the club announced New Jersey kit for the 2020 Malaysia Premier League season.

On 10 May 2019, Ezequiel Agüero signed a contract with the club.

On 14 July 2019, the club won 6–3 over Sarawak in Malaysia Premier League match.

Started matchday 7, on 30 April 2019, Kang Seung-jo has been appointed as club captain, previously held by Abdul Qayyum Jabrullah.

== Coaching staff ==
- Head coach: Manzoor Azwira
- Assistant head coach: Kamal Kalid
- Assistant coach: Mat Saiful Mohamad
- Goalkeeper coach: Khairul Nizam Mohd Taib
- Fitness coach: Mohd Rozy Abdul Majid

== Players ==
As of the 2019 season.

=== First-team squad ===
Note: Flags indicate national team as defined under FIFA eligibility rules; some limited exceptions apply. Players may hold more than one non-FIFA nationality.

No.	Pos.	Nation	Player
1	GK	(Malaysia) MAS	Zamir Selamat
2	MF	(Malaysia) MAS	Che Mohamad Safwan
3	MF	(Malaysia) MAS	Lim Yong Sheng
4	DF	(Malaysia) MAS	Abdul Qayyum Jabrullah
5	DF	(Malaysia) MAS	Khairul Akmal
6	DF	(Malaysia) MAS	Wan Mohd Syukri (on loan from Melaka United)
7	MF	(South Korea) KOR	Kang Seung-jo (captain)
8	MF	(Malaysia) MAS	Dhiyaulrahman Hasry
9	FW	(Brazil) BRA	Casagrande (on loan from Melaka United, vice-captain)
10	FW	(Argentina) ARG	Julián Bottaro
11	MF	(Malaysia) MAS	Azrul Ahmad
12	MF	(Malaysia) MAS	Al-Hafiz Harun
13	MF	(Malaysia) MAS	Afif Azman
14	FW	(Malaysia) MAS	Faizzudin Abidin (on loan from Selangor)
15	DF	(Malaysia) MAS	Aziz Ismail
16	FW	(Argentina) ARG	Ezequiel Agüero

No.	Pos.	Nation	Player
17	DF	(Malaysia) MAS	Tunku Noor Hidayat
18	FW	(Malaysia) MAS	Rahizi Rasib
19	MF	(Malaysia) MAS	Sivanesan Shanmugan
21	MF	(Malaysia) MAS	Amirul Syazani
22	GK	(Malaysia) MAS	Faizal Yusoff
23	MF	(Malaysia) MAS	Ikhmal Ibrahim
24	MF	(Malaysia) MAS	Syukur Saidin
25	GK	(Malaysia) MAS	Hazrull Hafiz
26	DF	(Malaysia) MAS	Segar Arumugam
29	FW	(Malaysia) MAS	Afiq Azmi
30	MF	(Malaysia) MAS	Nurfais Johari
31	MF	(Malaysia) MAS	Danish Afiq
32	GK	(Malaysia) MAS	Arif Razali
35	MF	(Malaysia) MAS	Danial Arifin
36	MF	(Malaysia) MAS	Anuar Shaukie
52	DF	(Malaysia) MAS	Yoges Muniandy (on loan from Petaling Jaya City)

== Competitions ==
=== Malaysia Premier League ===
2 February 2019 1	Penang	2–3	Terengganu II	Penang
		Report		Stadium: City Stadium

9 February 2019 2	Sarawak	2–0	Penang	Kuching
		Report		Stadium: Sarawak State Stadium

16 February 2019 3	Penang	1–0	PDRM	Penang
		Report		Stadium: City Stadium

24 February 2019 4	Negeri Sembilan	1–1	Penang	Paroi
		Report		Stadium: Tuanku Abdul Rahman Stadium

1 March 2019 5	Penang	1–2	UiTM	Penang
		Report		Stadium: City Stadium

9 March 2019 6	Penang	2–1	Selangor United	Penang
		Report		Stadium: City Stadium

30 March 2019 7	Sabah	2–0	Penang	Kota Kinabalu
		Report		Stadium: Likas Stadium

6 April 2019 8	Penang	1–1	UKM	Penang
		Report		Stadium: City Stadium

19 April 2019 9	Penang	0–2	Johor Darul Ta'zim II	Penang
		Report		Stadium: City Stadium

26 April 2019 10	Kelantan	2–1	Penang	Kota Bharu
		Report		Stadium: Sultan Muhammad IV Stadium

3 May 2019 11	UKM	1–1	Penang	Cheras
		Report		Stadium: Kuala Lumpur Stadium

11 May 2019 12	Penang	4–1	Kelantan	Penang
		Report		Stadium: City Stadium

18 May 2019 13	Johor Darul Ta'zim II	0–2	Penang	Pasir Gudang
		Report		Stadium: Pasir Gudang Corporation Stadium

25 May 2019 14	Penang	0–0	Sabah	Penang
		Report		Stadium: City Stadium

15 June 2019 15	Selangor United	1–3	Penang	Selayang
		Report		Stadium: Selayang Stadium

19 June 2019 16	UiTM	3–3	Penang	Shah Alam
		Report		Stadium: UiTM Stadium

26 June 2019 17	Penang	2–1	Negeri Sembilan	Penang
		Report		Stadium: City Stadium

6 July 2019 18	Terengganu II	0–0	Penang	Kuala Terengganu
		Report		Stadium: Sultan Ismail Nasiruddin Shah Stadium

14 July 2019 19	Penang	6–3	Sarawak	Penang
		Report		Stadium: City Stadium

20 July 2019 20	PDRM	1–2	Penang	Krubong
		Report		Stadium: Hang Jebat Stadium

Pos	Team	Pld	W	D	L	GF	GA	GD	Pts	Qualification or relegation
5	UiTM (Note: UiTM F.C. is promoted to replaced PKNS F.C. relegated after withdrawing license to complete for the 2020 Malaysia Premier League season as they become feeder club to Selangor FA.) (P)	20	8	5	7	33	25	+8	29	Promotion to Super League and Qualification for the Malaysia Cup group stage
6	Negeri Sembilan	20	8	5	7	29	25	+4	29	Qualification for the Malaysia Cup group stage
7	Penang	20	8	6	6	32	27	+5	24 (Note: Penang have been docked six points following the club’s failure to comply with FIFA’s decision over claims made by former Brazilian import defender, Reinaldo Lobo.)	Qualification for the Malaysia Cup group stage
8	UKM	20	6	4	10	28	32	−4	22	
9	Selangor United	20	6	3	11	24	37	−13	21	

Source: MFL
Rules for classification: 1) Points; 2) Goal difference; 3) Number of goals scored.
(P) Promoted

=== Malaysia FA Cup ===
3 April 2019 Second round	Penang	1–0	Penjara	Penang
		Report		Stadium: City Stadium

16 April 2019 Third round	Penang	2–4	Kuala Lumpur	Penang
		Report		Stadium: City Stadium

=== Malaysia Cup ===
==== Group stage ====
Pos	Team	Pld	W	D	L	GF	GA	GD	Pts	Qualification	PAH	PRK	PEN	SAB
1	Pahang	6	5	0	1	12	5	+7	15	Advance to knockout stage	—	3–0	3–1	1–0
2	Perak	6	2	3	1	9	7	+2	9	Advance to knockout stage	3–1	—	1–1	3–0
3	Penang	6	1	2	3	5	10	−5	5		0–2	1–1	—	2–1
4	Sabah	6	1	1	4	5	9	−4	4		1–2	1–1	2–0	—

Source: FAM MFL

3 August 2019 1	Pahang	3–1	Penang	Kuantan
				Stadium: Darul Makmur Stadium

7 August 2019 2	Penang	2–1	Sabah	Penang
		Report		Stadium: City Stadium

17 August 2019 3	Perak	1–1	Penang	Ipoh
				Stadium: Perak Stadium

24 August 2019 4	Penang	1–1	Perak	Penang
				Stadium: City Stadium

14 September 2019 5	Sabah	2–0	Penang	Kota Kinabalu
				Stadium: Likas Stadium

18 September 2019 6	Penang	0–2	Pahang	Penang
				Stadium: City Stadium

== Statistics ==
=== Appearances and goals ===
No.	Pos	Nat	Player	Total		Malaysia Premier League		Malaysia FA Cup		Malaysia Cup	
No.	Pos	Nat	Player	Apps	Goals	Apps	Goals	Apps	Goals	Apps	Goals
Goalkeepers
1	GK	(Malaysia) MAS	Zamir Selamat	14	0	8	0	0	0	6	0
25	GK	(Malaysia) MAS	Hazrull Hafiz	14	0	11+1	0	2	0	0	0
Defenders
4	DF	(Malaysia) MAS	Abdul Qayyum Jabrullah	21	0	19	0	1	0	1	0
5	DF	(Malaysia) MAS	Khairul Akmal	23	0	10+7	0	1	0	2+3	0
6	DF	(Malaysia) MAS	Wan Mohd Syukri	9	0	5+1	0	0	0	0+3	0
15	DF	(Malaysia) MAS	Aziz Ismail	10	0	8	0	1	0	0+1	0
17	DF	(Malaysia) MAS	Tunku Noor Hidayat	10	0	4+4	0	1	0	0+1	0
26	DF	(Malaysia) MAS	Segar Arumugam	17	0	7+3	0	1	0	6	0
44	DF	(Malaysia) MAS	Azmeer Aris	4	0	0+1	0	0	0	3	0
52	DF	(Malaysia) MAS	Yoges Muniandy	14	0	8	0	0	0	6	0
Midfielders
2	MF	(Malaysia) MAS	Che Mohamad Safwan	18	0	10	0	2	0	5+1	0
7	MF	(South Korea) KOR	Kang Seung-jo	27	1	19	1	2	0	6	0
8	MF	(Malaysia) MAS	Dhiyaulrahman Hasry	10	1	9	1	0+1	0	0	0
11	MF	(Malaysia) MAS	Azrul Ahmad	20	0	13+3	0	0	0	4	0
12	MF	(Malaysia) MAS	Al-Hafiz Harun	14	4	4+2	4	1+1	0	6	0
13	MF	(Malaysia) MAS	Afif Azman	22	0	7+11	0	1+1	0	0+2	0
19	MF	(Malaysia) MAS	Sivanesan Shanmugan	6	2	3+1	1	2	1	0	0
24	MF	(Malaysia) MAS	Syukur Saidin	12	0	3+4	0	0	0	5	0
30	MF	(Malaysia) MAS	Nurfais Johari	14	1	5+5	0	1	0	2+1	1
31	MF	(Malaysia) MAS	Danish Afiq	1	0	0+1	0	0	0	0	0
35	MF	(Malaysia) MAS	Danial Arifin	2	0	0+1	0	0	0	0+1	0
45	MF	(Malaysia) MAS	Daniel Irfan	2	0	0	0	0	0	0+2	0
Forwards
9	FW	(Brazil) BRA	Casagrande	14	9	8	8	0	0	6	1
10	FW	(Argentina) ARG	Julián Bottaro	27	10	19	8	2	0	6	2
14	FW	(Malaysia) MAS	Faizzudin Abidin	2	0	2	0	0	0	0	0
16	FW	(Argentina) ARG	Ezequiel Agüero	12	5	7	5	0	0	5	0
18	FW	(Malaysia) MAS	Rahizi Rasib	3	0	1+2	0	0	0	0	0
29	FW	(Malaysia) MAS	Afiq Azmi	17	1	6+7	1	1+1	0	0+2	0
Players transferred out during the season
1	GK	(Malaysia) MAS	Syamim Othman	1	0	1	0	0	0	0	0
6	DF	(Malaysia) MAS	Stuart Wark	10	0	6+3	0	0+1	0	0	0
9	FW	(Australia) AUS	Ndumba Makeche	11	3	9	1	1+1	2	0	0
16	MF	(Haiti) HAI	Sébastien Thurière	12	1	9+1	1	2	0	0	0

Last updated: 20 July 2019
Source: Competitions
