= Giovane =

Giovane may refer to:

- Giovane Élber (born 1972), Élber de Souza, Brazilian football striker
- Giovane Gávio (born 1970), Brazilian volleyball coach and player
- Giovane Gomes (born 1995), Brazilian football forward
- Giovane (footballer, born 1982), Giovane Alves da Silva, Hong Kong football striker
- Giovane (footballer, born 1998), Giovane Mario De Jesús, Brazilian football midfielder
- Giovane (footballer, born 2003), Giovane Santana do Nascimento, Brazilian football forward
