= Fairuz Zakaria =

Malaysian footballer

Personal information
- Full name: Mohammad Fairuz bin Zakaria
- Date of birth: 25 May 1997 (age 29)
- Place of birth: Penang, Malaysia
- Height: 1.73 m (5 ft 8 in)
- Position: Full-back

Team information
- Current team: AAK UNISEL
- Number: 15

Youth career
- 2018–2019: Kedah Darul Aman U21

Senior career*
Years	Team	Apps	(Gls)
2019	Perlis Northern Lions	0	(0)
2019	Kedah Darul Aman	0	(0)
2020	Penang	8	(0)
2021	Kedah Darul Aman	12	(0)
2022–2025	Penang	40	(0)
2025–2026	DPMM	19	(0)
2026–	AAK UNISEL	0	(0)
- * Club domestic league appearances and goals as of 30 August 2026

Mohammad Fairuz bin Zakaria (born 25 May 1997) is a Malaysian professional footballer who plays as a full-back for AAK UNISEL FC of the Malaysia A1 Semi-Pro League.

== Playing career ==
Fairuz was a member of the Kedah Darul Aman under-21 team that reached all the way to the final of the 2018 Piala Presiden where they were beaten by Terengganu III.

At the start of the 2019 Malaysia Premier League, Fairuz moved to Perlis Northern Lions but the team were disqualified from the league after only three matches played due to inaccurate documentation of feasibility by the Malaysian Football League (MFL). Fairuz returned to Kedah Darul Aman, being registered with the first team in mid-season.

Fairuz's next destination was Penang for the 2020 Malaysia Premier League and he helped the islanders win the championship after 11 games and subsequent promotion to the 2021 Malaysia Super League. He returned to Kedah the year after and was a steady fixture at left back, boosting Sang Kenari to a second-place finish behind Johor Darul Ta'zim who also eliminated them from the year's Malaysia Cup.

Fairuz was re-signed by Penang from the 2022 season. Although the team had a torrid season and finished in last place, they were saved from relegation by the withdrawals and expulsions of three clubs that finished above them: Petaling Jaya City, Melaka United and Sarawak United. They also had an impressive run in the year's FA Cup where they reached the semi-finals. Fairuz played with Penang for the next two campaigns until his release was announced by the club at the end of the 2024–25 season.

On the same day of his announced release, Fairuz moved to Bruneian outfit DPMM for the 2025–26 season, the first Malaysian to be recruited for their new campaign in Malaysia. After 19 league appearances, he was released by the club at the end of the season.

In August 2026, Fairuz transferred to AAK UNISEL FC of Selangor.

== Career statistics ==
=== Club ===
As of 15 May 2026

Appearances and goals by club, season and competition
Club	Season	League			Cup		FA Cup		Continental		Total	
Club	Season	Division	Apps	Goals	Apps	Goals	Apps	Goals	Apps	Goals	Apps	Goals
Penang	2020	Malaysia Premier League	8	0	–		1	0	–		9	0
Kedah Darul Aman	2021	Malaysia Super League	12	0	–		4	0	–		16	0
Penang	2022	Malaysia Super League	17	0	2	0	2	0	–		21	0
Penang	2023	Malaysia Super League	4	0	0	0	1	0	–		5	0
Penang	2024–25	Malaysia Super League	19	0	2	0	1	0	–		22	0
Penang	Total		40	0	4	0	4	0	–		48	0
DPMM	2025–26	Malaysia Super League	19	0	4	0	2	0	–		25	0
AAK UNISEL	2026–27	Malaysia A1 Semi-Pro League	0	0	0	0	0	0	–		0	0
Career total			79	0	8	0	11	0	0	0	98	0

== Honours ==
Kedah

- Piala Presiden: 2018 (runners-up)
- Malaysia Super League: 2021 (runners-up)

Penang

- Malaysia Premier League: 2020
