= Khatul Anuar =

Malaysian footballer

Personal information
- Full name: Khatul Anuar bin Md Jalil
- Date of birth: 2 April 1997 (age 29)
- Place of birth: Alor Star, Kedah, Malaysia
- Height: 1.81 m (5 ft 11 in)
- Position: Goalkeeper

Team information
- Current team: Penang
- Number: 97

Youth career
- 2011: Tunku Mahkota Ismail Sports School
- 2014: Harimau Muda C
- 2017: Kuala Lumpur

Senior career*
Years	Team	Apps	(Gls)
2017–2021	Kuala Lumpur City	2	(0)
2019	→ UKM (loan)	10	(0)
2022–2024	Penang	12	(0)
2024–2025	Kelantan Darul Naim	6	(0)
2025–2026	Penang		

International career^{‡}
2018–2019	Malaysia U23	0	(0)
- * Club domestic league appearances and goals as of August 2026 ‡ National team caps and goals as of 29 May 2016

Khatul Anuar bin Md Jalil (born 2 April 1997) is a Malaysian professional footballer who plays as a goalkeeper.

== Club career ==
=== Kuala Lumpur City ===
On 15 April 2018, Khatul made his debut for senior club in a 2–2 draw over Sri Pahang.

=== UKM (loan) ===
On 8 January 2019, Khatul joined Malaysia Premier League club UKM on a season-long loan.

=== Penang ===
On 9 June 2025, Khatul signed for Malaysia Super League club Penang from Kelantan The Real Warriors on free transfer.

== Career statistics ==
=== Club ===
As of match played 26 June 2025

Appearances and goals by club, season and competition
Club	Season	League			Cup (Note: Malaysia FA Cup)		League Cup (Note: Includes Malaysia Cup and Malaysia Challenge Cup)		Continental		Total	
Club	Season	Division	Apps	Goals	Apps	Goals	Apps	Goals	Apps	Goals	Apps	Goals
Kuala Lumpur City	2017	Malaysia Premier League	0	0	0	0	0	0	–		0	0
Kuala Lumpur City	2018	Malaysia Super League	2	0	2	0	0	0	–		4	0
Kuala Lumpur City	2020	Malaysia Premier League	0	0	0	0	0	0	–		0	0
Kuala Lumpur City	2021	Malaysia Super League	0	0	0	0	0	0	–		0	0
Kuala Lumpur City	Total		2	0	2	0	0	0	–		4	0
UKM (loan)	2019	Malaysia Premier League	10	0	2	0	10	0	–		22	0
UKM (loan)	Total		10	0	2	0	10	0	–		22	0
Penang	2022	Malaysia Super League	11	0	0	0	1	0	–		12	0
Penang	2023	Malaysia Super League	1	0	0	0	1	0	–		2	0
Penang	Total		12	0	0	0	2	0	–		14	0
Kelantan Darul Naim	2024-25	Malaysia Super League	6	0	0	0	0	0	–		6	0
Kelantan Darul Naim	Total		6	0	0	0	0	0	–		6	0
Career total			0	0	0	0	0	0	–	–	0	0

== Honours ==
Kuala Lumpur City

- Malaysia Cup: 2021

UKM

- Malaysia Challenge Cup runner-up: 2019

Penang

- MFL Challenge Cup runner-up: 2026
