= Khairul Akmal Rokisham =

Malaysian footballer (born 1998)

Khairul Akmal
Personal information
- Full name: Muhammad Khairul Akmal bin Rokisham
- Date of birth: 28 May 1998 (age 28)
- Place of birth: Penang, Malaysia
- Height: 1.79 m (5 ft 10 1/2 in)
- Position: Defender

Team information
- Current team: Penang
- Number: 6

Youth career
- 2014: Frenz United
- 2014–2017: Penang Academy

Senior career*
Years	Team	Apps	(Gls)
2017–	Penang	82	(1)

International career^{‡}
2013–2015	Malaysia U-17		
2015	Malaysia U-20		
- * Club domestic league appearances and goals as of 19 June 2025 ‡ National team caps and goals as of 19 June 2015

Muhammad Khairul Akmal bin Rokisham (born 28 May 1998) is a Malaysian professional football player who plays as a defender for Penang in the Malaysia Super League.

== Club career ==
=== FA Penang ===
On 7 May 2017, Akmal made his first-team debut for Penang coming on as a substitute for Zulkhairi Zulkeply in the 83rd minute of 1–2 loss match against Felda United at Penang State.

== Career statistics ==
=== Club ===
As of 20 June 2025

Appearances and goals by club, season and competition.
Club performance			League		FA Cup		Malaysia Cup		Others		Total	
Season	Club	League	Apps	Goals	Apps	Goals	Apps	Goals	Apps	Goals	Apps	Goals
2017	Penang	Malaysia Super League	6	0	0	0	0	0	–		6	0
2018	Penang	Malaysia Premier League	6	0	1	0	0	0	–		7	0
2019	Penang	Malaysia Premier League	17	0	1	0	5	0	–		23	0
2020	Penang	Malaysia Premier League	4	0	0	0	1	0	–		5	0
2021	Penang	Malaysia Super League	4	0	0	0	5	0	–		9	0
2022	Penang	Malaysia Super League	14	0	2	0	2	0	-		18	0
2023	Penang	Malaysia Super League	12	1	3	0	0	0	3 (Note: Appearances in MFL Challenge Cup)	0	18	1
2024–25	Penang	Malaysia Super League	7	0	0	0	0	0	3 (Note: Appearances in MFL Challenge Cup)	0	10	0
2025–26	Penang	Malaysia Super League	0	0	0	0	0	0	0	0	0	0
Total			82	1	7	0	13	0	6	0	108	1
Career total			82	1	7	0	13	0	6	0	108	1

== Honours ==
Penang

- Malaysia Premier League: 2020
- MFL Challenge Cup runner-up: 2026
