= Giovane (footballer, born 1998) =

Brazilian footballer

Personal information
- Full name: Giovane Mario De Jesús
- Date of birth: 23 March 1998 (age 28)
- Place of birth: Limeira, Brazil
- Height: 1.70 m (5 ft 7 in)
- Position: Midfielder

Team information
- Current team: Vitória

Youth career
- –2018: Santos FC

Senior career*
Years	Team	Apps	(Gls)
2019	Atlético Nacional	0	(0)
2019	→ Unión Magdalena (loan)	7	(0)
2020–	Vitória	0	(0)
- * Club domestic league appearances and goals as of 10:33, 9 June 2020 (UTC)

Giovane Mario De Jesús (born 23 March 1998), commonly known as Giovane, is a Brazilian footballer who currently plays as a midfielder for Esporte Clube Vitória.

== Career statistics ==
=== Club ===
As of 4 May 2019.

Club	Season	League			Cup		Other		Total	
Club	Season	Division	Apps	Goals	Apps	Goals	Apps	Goals	Apps	Goals
Atlético Nacional	2019	Categoría Primera A	0	0	0	0	0	0	0	0
Unión Magdalena (loan)	2019	Categoría Primera A	5	0	4 (Note: Appearances in the Copa Colombia)	1	0	0	9	1
Career total			5	0	4	1	0	0	9	1
