= Suwarnaraj Chinniah =

Malaysian footballer

C. Suwarnaraj
Personal information
- Full name: Suwarnaraj a/l Chinniah
- Date of birth: 3 February 1998 (age 28)
- Place of birth: Johor, Malaysia
- Height: 1.72 m (5 ft 7 1/2 in)
- Position: Right-back

Team information
- Current team: Penang
- Number: 77

Youth career
- –2014: Malaysia Pahang Sports School
- 2015–2019: Perak

Senior career*
Years	Team	Apps	(Gls)
2020	Perak II	3	(0)
2021–	Penang	1	(0)

International career^{‡}
2016	Malaysia U19		
- * Club domestic league appearances and goals as of 17 August 2021 ‡ National team caps and goals as of 17 December 2016

Suwarnaraj a/l Chinniah (born 3 February 1998) is a Malaysian footballer who plays as a right-back for Malaysia Super League club Penang.
