= Chong Yee Fatt =

Malaysian association football manager

Personal information
- Full name: Chong Yee Fatt
- Place of birth: Ipoh, Malaysia

Senior career*
| Years | Team | Apps | (Gls) |
| 1981–1986 | Perak | | |

Managerial career
- 2011–2013: Perak (assistant coach)
- 2015–2016: DRB-Hicom
- 2017: Perak (assistant coach)
- 2018: Kuala Lumpur City (assistant coach)
- 2019–2020: Kuala Lumpur City (technical director)
- 2021: Perak
- 2021–2022: Penang (assistant coach)
- 2023: Penang
- * Club domestic league appearances and goals

Chong Yee Fatt is a Malaysian football manager.

A former football player who plays for Perak FA in the 1980s, Yee Fatt has coached in his former team Perak, DRB-HICOM FC and Kuala Lumpur.

Yee Fatt has been announced as the new Perak head coach in February 2021, after the club has parted way with their former head coach Mehmet Duraković. After the team's poor performance in the league, which saw Perak in the 2021 Malaysia Super League relegation zone, Yee Fatt was relieved of his duty as head coach on 2 August. His assistant Shahril Nizam took charge of the team until the end of the season which saw Perak relegated for the first time after 28 years, although Yee Fatt were still employed with the team until the end of his contract in November 2021.

On 21 December 2021, another Malaysia Super League club Penang, announced Yee Fatt as the side's new assistant coach. He becomes the head coach of Penang on 28 February 2023, after Penang failed in their appeal to MFL to appoint Mansoor Azwira as head coach. Yee Fatt and his assistant Mansoor were stood down from their responsibilities on 7 November 2023 after Penang's failure to progress to 2023 MFL Challenge Cup and poor performance in the Super League. Yee Fatt were replaced by Akmal Rizal Ahmad Rakhli for the final 3 games of Penang's season.
