= An Sae-hee =

South Korean footballer (born 1991)

Ahn Sae-Hee
Personal information
- Date of birth: 8 February 1991 (age 35)
- Place of birth: Incheon, South Korea
- Height: 1.86 m (6 ft 1 in)
- Position: Defender

Youth career
- 2007–2009: Boin High School
- 2010–2013: Halla University

Senior career*
Years	Team	Apps	(Gls)
2014–2016	Busan Ipark	5	(0)
2015–2016	→ Daejeon Citizen (loan)	4	(0)
2016–2020	FC Anyang	46	(2)
2017–2018	→ Pohang Steelers (loan)	2	(0)
2018–2019	→ Sangju Sangmu (loan)	4	(0)
2020–2021	Gangneung Citizen	9	(2)
2021–2022	Cheongju FC	3	(0)
2021–2022	Yangju Citizen	4	(1)
2022–2023	Hoang Anh Gia Lai	8	(1)
2023	Penang	1	(0)
2023–2024	Monte Carlo	0	(0)
- * Club domestic league appearances and goals as of 20 February 2023

An Sae-Hee (born 8 February 1991) is a South Korean professional footballer who plays as a defender. Besides South Korea, he has played in Malaysia, Vietnam and Macau.

== Career ==
In 2016, Ahn signed for FC Anyang. On 30 December 2022, Ahn was announced that he will signed for Penang. He made his debut as a starting central defender in a pre-season game against Manjung City. On 10 May 2023, Ahn was announced he has reached an agreement with the club to terminate his current contract and leave Penang.
