= Amer Azahar =

Malaysian footballer

Personal information
- Full name: Mohammad Amer bin Azahar
- Date of birth: 22 June 1995 (age 31)
- Place of birth: Penang, Malaysia
- Height: 1.77 m (5 ft 10 in)
- Position: Winger

Youth career
- UiTM

Senior career*
Years	Team	Apps	(Gls)
2016–2019	UiTM		
2020–2021	Penang	28	(1)
2022	Kedah Darul Aman	10	(0)
2023–2025	Penang	14	(0)
- * Club domestic league appearances and goals as of 15 October 2022

Mohammad Amer bin Azahar (born 22 June 1995) is a Malaysian footballer who plays as a winger for Malaysia Super League club .

== Career statistics ==
=== Club ===
As of 15 October 2022

Appearances and goals by club, season and competition
Club	Season	League			Cup		League Cup		Continental		Total	
Club	Season	Division	Apps	Goals	Apps	Goals	Apps	Goals	Apps	Goals	Apps	Goals
Penang	2020	Malaysia Super League	11	1	–		1	1	–		12	2
Penang	2021	Malaysia Super League	17	0	–		6	1	–		23	1
Penang	Total		28	1	–		7	2	–		35	3
Kedah Darul Aman	2022	Malaysia Super League	10	0	1	2	0	0	–		11	2
Kedah Darul Aman	Total		10	0	1	2	0	0	–		11	2
Career total			0	0	0	0	0	0	0	0	0	0

== Honours ==
Penang

- Malaysia Premier League: 2020

Kedah Darul Aman

- Malaysia Super League runner-up: 2022
