= Jafri Firdaus Chew =

Malaysian footballer

Personal information
- Full name: Muhammad Jafri bin Muhammad Firdaus Chew
- Date of birth: 11 June 1997 (age 29)
- Place of birth: Bagan Luar, Penang, Malaysia
- Height: 1.75 m (5 ft 9 in)
- Positions: Forward; winger; right back

Team information
- Current team: Melaka
- Number: 11

Youth career
- 2013–2015: Harimau Muda B
- 2016: Penang U-19

Senior career*
Years	Team	Apps	(Gls)
2016–2017	Penang	24	(1)
2018–2019	PKNS	24	(3)
2021–2022	Penang	17	(1)
2023–2026	Sabah	27	(6)
2026–	Melaka		

International career^{‡}
2013–2017	Malaysia U19	18	(13)
2016–2019	Malaysia U23	24	(4)
Medal record
Malaysia under-23
Sea Games
Silver medal – second place	Sea Games 2017	Football
- * Club domestic league appearances and goals as of 6 October 2024 ‡ National team caps and goals as of March 24, 2019

Muhammad Jafri bin Muhammad Firdaus Chew (born 11 June 1997) is a Malaysian professional footballer who plays as a forward for Malaysia Super League club Melaka and the Malaysia U23 national team. Jafri Firdaus Chew came up through Blue football academy (now known as the Assumption- Bintang Biru Football Academy). He started his footballing career with Harimau Muda B in 2013. On 25 November 2015, it was confirmed that the Harimau Muda has disbanded by Football Association of Malaysia which means all the player from Harimau Muda A, Harimau Muda B and Harimau Muda C will be returned to their own state. He also has been called by Frank Bernhardt, the Malaysian Under-19 national coach, for preparation for the 2016 AFF U-19 Youth Championship which was held in Hanoi, Vietnam from 11 to 24 September 2016.

This makes him joined Penang FA to play for Penang U-19 and impressed from an early stage. His performances earned him a start in first team. He made his first team debut for Penang FA in 2016, while Chew represented his country in a Malaysia U22 international, having previously represented his country at under-17, under-19 and under-21 levels.

== Club career ==
=== Penang FA ===
Since Harimau Muda was disbanded by FAM, which meant all the player from Harimau Muda A, Harimau Muda B and Harimau Muda C had to return to their own state. Jafri Firdaus Chew is with Penang FA for the Penang U21, before being promoted to first team in year 2016 to play in the top division of Malaysian football, the Malaysia Super League.

On 28 October 2017, Jafri has scored his first senior goals on his 24th appearance for Penang FA in the 2017 Malaysia Super League match against Selangor FA in a 1–3 defeat.

=== PKNS ===
On 5 November 2017, Jafri signed with PKNS for 2018 Malaysia Super League.

=== Sabah ===
On 25 December 2022, Jafri joined Sabah from Penang after returning for his second spell at the club. On 9 August 2023, Jafri scored his first goal for Sabah in a 1–5 defeat to Johor Darul Ta'zim.

== Career statistics ==
=== Club ===
As of match played 20 December 2022

Malaysia			League		FA Cup		Malaysia Cup		Asia		Total	
Season	Club	League	Apps	Goals	Apps	Goals	Apps	Goals	Apps	Goals	Apps	Goals
2016	Penang	Malaysia Super League	12	0	0	0	0	0	–		12	0
2017	Penang	Malaysia Super League	12	1	2	0	0	0	–		14	1
Penang Total			24	1	2	0	0	0	–		26	1
2018	PKNS	Malaysia Super League	13	2	5	1	5	0	–		23	3
2019	PKNS	Malaysia Super League	11	1	2	0	4	1	–		17	2
PKNS Total			24	3	7	1	9	1	–		40	5
2021	Penang	Malaysia Super League	4	1	–		6	1	–		10	2
2022	Penang	Malaysia Super League	13	0	2	0	2	0	–		17	0
Penang Total			17	1	2	0	8	1	–		27	2
2023	Sabah	Malaysia Super League	0	0	–		0	0	–		0	0
Sabah Total			0	0	0	0	0	0	–		0	0
Career total			65	5	11	1	17	2	–		93	8

=== Malaysia Under-23 ===
As of September 2017.

#	Date	Venue	Opponent	Result	Goal	Competition
1.	19 July 2017	National Stadium, Bangkok, Thailand	Indonesia	3-0	1	2018 AFC U-23 Championship qualification
2.	23 August 2017	Shah Alam Stadium, Malaysia	Laos	3–1	2	Football at the 2017 Southeast Asian Games.

== Honours ==
=== International ===
Malaysia U-23

- SEA Games
  - (silver) Silver 2017
