= Julián Bottaro =

Argentine footballer

Personal information
- Full name: Julián Bottaro
- Date of birth: 28 September 1992 (age 34)
- Place of birth: Buenos Aires, Argentina
- Height: 1.70 m (5 ft 7 in)
- Positions: Attacking midfielder; forward

Team information
- Current team: Young Elephants

Youth career
- 2010–2011: Huracán

Senior career*
Years	Team	Apps	(Gls)
2010–2012	Huracán	16	(0)
2013–2014	PUCE	0	(0)
2014–2015	Lamadrid		
2016–2018	Barracas		
2019	Penang	19	(8)
2020–2022	UKM	0	(0)
2023-	Young Elephants	0	(0)
- * Club domestic league appearances and goals

Julián Bottaro (born 28 September 1992) is an Argentine footballer who plays for Laos side Young Elephants as a forward.

== Honours ==
Penang

- Malaysia Premier League: 2020
