= Azmeer Aris =

Malaysian association football player

Personal information
- Full name: Muhammad Azmeer Aris bin Nor Rashid
- Date of birth: 5 August 1999 (age 27)
- Place of birth: Penang, Malaysia
- Height: 1.73 m (5 ft 8 in)
- Position: Left-back

Team information
- Current team: Immigration
- Number: 37

Youth career
- Bintang Biru Football Academy
- Bukit Jalil Sports School
- 2013: SMK Mutiara Impian
- 2017–2020: Penang U21

Senior career*
Years	Team	Apps	(Gls)
2021	Penang	14	(0)
2022	Kedah Darul Aman	16	(0)
2023–2025	Penang	25	(0)
2025–	Immigration		
- * Club domestic league appearances and goals

Muhammad Azmeer Aris bin Nor Rashid (born 5 August 1999) is a Malaysian professional footballer who plays as a left-back for Malaysia Super League club Immigration. Azmeer started his career as a winger.

== Career statistics ==
=== Club ===
As of 8 October 2022

Appearances and goals by club, season and competition
Club	Season	League			Cup		League Cup		Continental		Total	
Club	Season	Division	Apps	Goals	Apps	Goals	Apps	Goals	Apps	Goals	Apps	Goals
Penang	2021	Malaysia Super League	14	0	–		1	0	–		15	0
Penang	Total		14	0	0	0	1	0	0	0	15	0
Kedah	2022	Malaysia Super League	16	0	2	0	0	0	3	0	21	0
Kedah	Total		16	0	2	0	0	0	3	0	21	0
Career total			30	0	2	0	1	0	3	0	36	0
