= Tam Sheang Tsung =

Japanese footballer (born 1995)

Personal information
- Date of birth: 24 May 1995 (age 31)
- Place of birth: Tokyo, Japan
- Height: 1.74 m (5 ft 9 in)
- Position: Midfielder

Youth career
- Yokohama FC
- São Bernardo
- Mito HollyHock
- 2012–2013: Shanghai Shenhua
- 2014: Avispa Fukuoka

Senior career*
Years	Team	Apps	(Gls)
2015	Kataller Toyama	0	(0)
2016	Gainare Tottori	0	(0)
2017	Melaka United	0	(0)
2017	→ Kuala Lumpur City (loan)	1	(0)
2018	D'AR Wanderers	5	(0)
2018–2019	Alcanenense	9	(0)
2020–2021	Kedah Darul Aman	1	(0)
2022	Penang	1	(0)
2023	Kuala Lumpur Rovers	0	(0)
- * Club domestic league appearances and goals as of 5 March 2023

Tam Sheang Tsung (Japanese: タム・シイアンツン; born 24 May 1995) is a Japanese former professional footballer who played as a midfielder.

== Career ==
In 2009, Tsung joined the youth academy of Brazilian side São Bernardo. At the age of 15, he trained with Cardiff City in the English second division. In 2012, he joined the youth academy of Chinese club Shanghai Shenhua. Before the 2014 season, Tsung moved to the youth academy of Avispa Fukuoka in the Japanese second division. The following year, before the 2015 season, he signed with the Japanese third division team Kataller Toyama. Ahead of the 2017 season, he joined Melaka United in the Malaysian top flight, and later that year, he signed with Malaysian second division side KL City. In 2018, Tsung moved to Alcanenense in the Portuguese fourth division. Finally, before the 2020 season, he returned to Malaysia to sign with top-flight side Kedah Darul Aman.
