= Tomáš Trucha =

Czech football manager (born 1971)

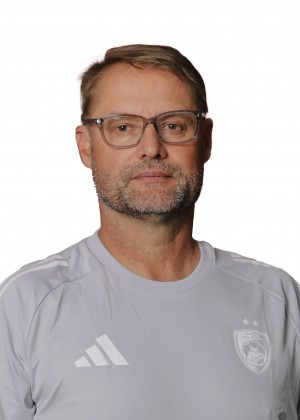

Personal information
- Date of birth: 17 October 1971 (age 55)
- Place of birth: Czech Republic

Team information
- Current team: Maziya S&RC (head coach)

Managerial career
- Years: Team
- 2013: Valašské Meziříčí
- 2013–2014: FC Cape Town (youth)
- 2016–2017: Viktoria Plzeň (assistant)
- 2018–2019: Orapa United
- 2019–2020: Township Rollers
- 2020: A.F.C. Leopards
- 2021–2022: Penang
- 2022–2023: Kelantan United
- 2023–2025: A.F.C. Leopards
- 2025-2026: PSM Makassar

Tomáš Trucha (born 17 October 1971) is a Czech football coach. He is currently the head coach of Super League club PSM Makassar. Besides Czech Republic, he has managed in South Africa, Kenya, Botswana, Malaysia, and Indonesia.

== Managerial career ==
In 2013, Trucha managed Czech third division side Valašské Meziříčí. After that, he worked as youth coach at FC Cape Town in South Africa.

In 2016, he was appointed assistant manager of Viktoria Plzeň, one of the Czech Republic's most successful clubs.

In 2018, Trucha was appointed manager of Orapa United in Botswana.

In 2019, he was appointed manager of Township Rollers, Botswana's most successful team.

In 2020, he was appointed manager of AFC Leopards in Kenya, but left after a month due to receiving physical threats from people claiming to be members of AFC Leopards.

Before the 2021 season, Trucha was appointed manager of Malaysian outfit Penang.

== Managerial statistics ==
As of 2 March 2026

Managerial record by team and tenure
Team	Nat.	From	To	Record					Ref.
Team	Nat.	From	To	G	W	D	L	Win %	Ref.
Tygerberg	(South Africa)	1 July 2012	31 December 2012	11	6	4	1	54.55	
Valašské Meziříčí	(Czech Republic)	1 January 2013	30 June 2013	14	5	2	7	35.71	
Orapa United	(Botswana)	1 December 2018	31 March 2019	11	3	1	7	27.27	
Township Rollers	(Botswana)	2 July 2019	1 November 2020	22	12	5	5	54.55	
Leopards	(Kenya)	2 November 2020	3 December 2020	1	1	0	0	100.00	
Penang	(Malaysia)	4 December 2020	29 April 2022	35	14	9	12	40.00	
Kelantan United	(Malaysia)	30 December 2022	8 April 2023	7	0	2	5	0.00	
Leopards	(Kenya)	16 October 2023	30 June 2025	62	25	23	14	40.32	
PSM Makassar	(Indonesia)	3 November 2025	2 March 2026	15	4	2	9	26.67	
Career Total				178	70	48	60	39.33	
