= Marcus Mah =

Malaysian footballer (born 1995)

Personal information
- Full name: Marcus Mah Yung Jian
- Date of birth: 2 April 1995 (age 31)
- Place of birth: Kuala Lumpur, Malaysia
- Height: 1.80 m (5 ft 11 in)
- Positions: Midfielder; forward

Team information
- Current team: Armed Forces
- Number: 8

Senior career*
Years	Team	Apps	(Gls)
2017	KL MOF		
2018	DBKL SC	10	(2)
2019	Petaling Jaya City	3	(0)
2020–2021	Penang	7	(0)
2022	Petaling Jaya City	5	(0)
2023–2024	Penang	1	(0)
2023–2024	→ Bukit Tambun(loan)	14	(3)
2024–2025	BR Damansara	13	(1)
2025–	Armed Forces	14	(3)
- * Club domestic league appearances and goals as of 10 April 2026

Marcus Mah Yung Jian (born 2 April 1995) is a Malaysian footballer who plays as a midfielder for Malaysia A1 Semi-Pro League club Armed Forces

== Career ==
A student of SMK BUD 4, Marcus began his youth career in 2011 with the Selangor Chinese football team for the Malaysian Chinese Football Association (MCFA) League. He were then invited to participate with Penang Chinese Recreation Club (CRC) Football Academy after being described as a highly talented player, he has managed to secure a private sponsorship for his trip.

In 2016, Marcus scored the winner in the final of the season's MCFA Cup to deliver Selangor Chinese's maiden FA Cup triumph. Sweeter still for the side, Marcus emerged as the tournament's top scorer, having scored a total of seven goals in the tournament.

He was handed a professional contract to play for KL MOF FC in the Malaysia FAM League in 2017, then transferred to the football team of the DBKL SC onwards. He made his debut on 25 February 2018 in a 0–1 loss against Selangor United, coming on as an 75th-minute substitute. He later moved to Petaling Jaya City in 2019. After making three appearances for The Phoenix, Marcus put pen to paper to a contract with Penang for the upcoming 2020 Malaysia Premier League.

== Honours ==
=== Club ===
Penang

- Malaysia Premier League: 2020
