= Casagrande (footballer) =

Brazilian footballer

Personal information
- Full name: Anselmo Arruda da Silva
- Date of birth: 2 July 1990 (age 36)
- Place of birth: Barra do Corda, Brazil
- Height: 1.90 m (6 ft 3 in)
- Position: Striker

Senior career*
Years	Team	Apps	(Gls)
2010	Cordino		
2010	Botafogo-PB	10	(5)
2011	Cordino		
2011	Jataiense		
2012	Real Noroeste	0	(0)
2013	Maranhão	7	(3)
2013–2014	Sampaio Corrêa	1	(0)
2014	Jacuipense	11	(5)
2015	Coruripe	0	(0)
2015	→ Salgueiro (loan)	12	(3)
2015	→ Maranhão (loan)	0	(0)
2016	Kuala Lumpur City	8	(8)
2017	Campinense	0	(0)
2017	Cordino	5	(1)
2017	Boa Esporte	19	(2)
2018	Felcra	19	(20)
2019	Melaka United	11	(2)
2019	→ Penang (loan)	8	(8)
2020–2022	Penang	35	(23)
2023	Negeri Sembilan	14	(5)

International career
2009–2010	Brazil U20	1	(3)
- * Club domestic league appearances and goals as of 14 August 2023

Anselmo Arruda da Silva (born 2 July 1990), commonly known as Casagrande, is a Brazilian professional footballer who plays as a striker.

== Club career ==
=== Negeri Sembilan ===
On 21 February 2023, he officially joined Negeri Sembilan FC.

He made his first debut for the team on 26 February 2023, on the opening match against Sri Pahang. Which he scored his first goal too and the game ended 1-1 draw.

At the end of the season, he became the club top scorer, with 6 goals alongside Shahrel Fikri.

== Career statistics ==
=== Club ===
As of match played 12 September 2022

Club	Season	League			State League		Cup		Other		Total	
Club	Season	Division	Apps	Goals	Apps	Goals	Apps	Goals	Apps	Goals	Apps	Goals
Real Noroeste	2012	–			0	0	1 (Note: Appearances in the Copa do Brasil)	0	0	0	1	0
Maranhão	2013	Série D	7	3	0	0	1	0	0	0	8	3
Sampaio Corrêa	2013	Série C	1	0	0	0	0	0	0	0	1	0
Sampaio Corrêa	2014	Série B	0	0	11 (Note: Appearances in the Campeonato Maranhense)	2	0	0	0	0	11	2
Sampaio Corrêa	Total		1	0	11	2	0	0	0	0	12	2
Jacuipense	2014	Série D	11	5	0	0	0	0	0	0	11	5
Coruripe	2015	Série D	0	0	11 (Note: Appearances in the Campeonato Alagoano)	4	1	0	6 (Note: Appearances in the Copa do Nordeste)	1	18	5
Salgueiro (loan)	2015	Série C	12	3	0	0	0	0	0	0	12	3
Maranhão (loan)	2015	–			4 (Note: Appearances in the Campeonato Maranhense A2)	2	0	0	0	0	4	2
Kuala Lumpur	2016	Liga Premier	8	8	–		4 (Note: Appearances in the Malaysia FA Cup)	1	0	0	12	9
Campinense	2017	Série D	0	0	10 (Note: Appearances in the Campeonato Paraibano)	1	1	0	4	0	15	1
Cordino	2017	Série D	5	1	0	0	0	0	0	0	5	1
Boa Esporte	2017	Série B	19	2	0	0	0	0	0	0	19	2
Felcra	2018	Malaysia Premier League	19	20	–		1	1	0	0	20	21
Melaka United	2019	Malaysia Super League	11	2	–		1	1	0	0	12	3
Penang (loan)	2019	Malaysia Premier League	8	8	0	0	6	1	—		14	9
Penang (loan)	Total		8	8	0	0	6	1	—		14	9
Penang	2020	Malaysia Premier League	11	9	—		1	1	—		12	10
Penang	2021	Malaysia Super League	19	12	—		2	0	—		21	12
Penang	2022	Malaysia Super League	5	2	1	0	0	0	—		6	2
Penang	Total		35	23	1	0	3	1	—		39	24
Career total			94	45	36	9	10	3	10	1	150	58

== Honours ==
=== Club ===
Penang

- Malaysia Premier League: 2020

=== Individual ===
- Malaysia Premier League top goalscorer: 2020
