= Shafiq Afifi =

Malaysian footballer

Personal information
- Full name: Shafiq Afifi bin Suhaimi
- Date of birth: 6 August 1999 (age 27)
- Place of birth: Ipoh, Malaysia
- Height: 1.85 m (6 ft 1 in)
- Position: Goalkeeper

Team information
- Current team: Kelantan Red Warrior
- Number: 22

Youth career
- 2017: PKNP U21

Senior career*
| Years | Team | Apps | (Gls) |
| 2018–2020 | PKNP | 5 | (0) |
| 2021–2025 | Penang | 14 | (0) |
| 2025– | Kelantan Red Warrior | 1 | (0) |

International career^{‡}
| 2017–2018 | Malaysia U19 | 4 | (0) |
Medal record
AFF U-19 Youth Championship
| First place | 2018 Indonesia |
| Second place | 2017 Myanmar |
- * Club domestic league appearances and goals as of 22 August 2025 ‡ National team caps and goals as of 14 July 2018

Shafiq Afifi bin Suhaimi (born 6 August 1999) is a Malaysian professional footballer who plays as a goalkeeper for Malaysia A1 Semi-Pro League club Kelantan Red Warrior.

== Personal life ==
Shafiq was born in Ipoh. His father, Suhaimi Mat Lazim is a former footballer who also played as a goalkeeper.

== Honours ==
Malaysia U19

- AFF U-19 Youth Championship: 2018
