= Giovane Gomes =

Brazilian footballer (born 1995)

Personal information
- Full name: Giovane Gomes da Silva
- Date of birth: 20 March 1995 (age 31)
- Place of birth: Brazil
- Height: 1.88 m (6 ft 2 in)
- Position: Forward

Team information
- Current team: Maringá
- Number: 9

Senior career*
Years	Team	Apps	(Gls)
2019	Pelotas	7	(0)
2019	→ Avenida (loan)	4	(0)
2020	Remo	1	(0)
2020–2022	Caxias	26	(10)
2021	→ Melaka United (loan)	5	(1)
2022	→ Novo Hamburgo (loan)	10	(0)
2023	Penang	13	(4)
2024	Manauara	2	(1)
2025	São José-RS	28	(14)
2025	→ Caxias (loan)	5	(0)
2026–	Maringá	26	(2)
- * Club domestic league appearances and goals as of 9 November 2026

Giovane Gomes da Silva (born 20 March 1995) is a Brazilian professional footballer who recently played as a forward for Brazilian club Maringá.

== Club career ==
=== Melaka United ===
On 27 May 2021, Gomes signed a contract with Malaysian club Melaka United. On 25 July 2021, he made his debut for the club in a 1–1 draw against Sri Pahang.

=== Penang FC ===
In February 2023, he joined Penang FC. He played as starting centre forward in a pre-season cup match against Selangor FC and won the Hope Cup.
