= Syazwan Zaipol =

Malaysian footballer

Personal information
- Full name: Muhamad Syazwan bin Zaipol Bahari
- Date of birth: 24 February 1995 (age 31)
- Place of birth: Perak, Malaysia
- Height: 1.85 m (6 ft 1 in)
- Position: Centre-back

Team information
- Current team: Melaka
- Number: 3

Youth career
- 2013: Harimau Muda C
- 2014: Harimau Muda B
- 2015–2016: Perak

Senior career*
Years	Team	Apps	(Gls)
2017	PKNP	11	(0)
2018–2019	Perak	6	(0)
2020	Petaling Jaya City	4	(0)
2021–2022	Penang	1	(0)
2023	Kelantan United		
2023	Melaka		

International career^{‡}
2017–2019	Malaysia U23	11	(0)
Medal record
Malaysia under-23
Sea Games
Silver medal – second place	Sea Games 2017	Football
- * Club domestic league appearances and goals as of August 8, 2021 ‡ National team caps and goals as of August 20, 2018

Muhamad Syazwan bin Zaipol Bahari (born 24 February 1995) is a Malaysian professional footballer who plays as centre-back for Malaysia Super League club Kelantan United and the Malaysia U-23 national team.

== Club career ==
=== Perak ===
On 6 December 2017, it has been confirmed that Syazwan will play for Malaysia Super League club Perak for upcoming 2018 Malaysia Super League season.

On 11 March 2018, Syazwan made his debut for Perak coming off the bench in a 3–0 win over Selangor at Naval Base Stadium.

== Career statistics ==
=== Club ===
As of match played 28 July 2018

Appearances and goals by club, season and competition
Club	Season	League			Cup		League Cup		Continental		Total	
Club	Season	Division	Apps	Goals	Apps	Goals	Apps	Goals	Apps	Goals	Apps	Goals
PKNP	2017	Malaysia Premier League	11	0	2	0	6	0	–		19	0
PKNP	Total		11	0	2	0	6	0	0	0	19	0
Perak	2018	Malaysia Super League	6	0	0	0	0	0	–		6	0
Perak	Total		6	0	0	0	0	0	0	0	6	0
Career total			17	0	0	0	0	0	0	0	25	0

== Honours ==
=== International ===
Malaysia U-23

- Southeast Asian Games

(silver) Silver Medal: 2017
