= Rafael Vitor =

Brazilian footballer

Personal information
- Full name: Rafael Vitor Santos de Freitas
- Date of birth: 5 January 1993 (age 33)
- Place of birth: Brazil
- Height: 1.92 m (6 ft 3 1/2 in)
- Position: Centre-back

Team information
- Current team: Star City
- Number: 17

Senior career*
Years	Team	Apps	(Gls)
2013–2015	Atlético Mineiro		
2013–2014	→ Tupi MG (loan)	13	(1)
2015	→ Novorizontino (loan)		
2015	América		
2016–2018	Atlético Mineiro		
2016	→ Boa (loan)	10	(2)
2017	→ Rio Negro (loan)		
2017–2018	→ Vila Nova (loan)	16	(2)
2018	Brasil de Pelotas	9	(0)
2019	Nacional AM		
2019	Amazonas FC		
2020–2025	Penang	96	(17)
2025–2026	Amazonas FC	11	(0)
2026–	Star City		
- * Club domestic league appearances and goals as of August 2026

Rafael Vitor Santos de Freitas (born 5 January 1993), commonly known as Rafael Vitor, is a Brazilian professional footballer who plays as a centre-back for Malaysia Super League club Star City.

== Career ==
On 3 August 2021, Rafael Vitor scored the fastest goal in the Malaysia Super League when he scored a goal just 9 seconds after the opening whistle against Perak FC. In addition, he also scored a hat-trick in a 3-5 win for Penang.

== Career statistics ==
Appearances and goals by club, season and competition
Club	Season	League			Cup		Continental (Note: Includes UEFA Champions League and UEFA Europa League)		Other (Note: Includes Malaysia Cup)		Total	
Club	Season	Division	Apps	Goals	Apps	Goals	Apps	Goals	Apps	Goals	Apps	Goals
Penang F.C.	2021	Malaysia Super League	21	5	3	1	0	0	0	0	24	6
Penang F.C.	2022	Malaysia Super League	15	2	2	0	0	0	2	0	19	2
Penang F.C.	2023	Malaysia Super League	25	4	2	0	0	0	2	0	29	4
Penang F.C.	2024–25	Malaysia Super League	20	4	3	0	0	0	2	0	25	4
Penang F.C.	Total		81	15	10	1	0	0	6	0	97	16

== Honours ==
=== Club ===
Penang

- Malaysia Premier League: 2020
