= City Stadium, Penang =

Multi-sports stadium in Penang, Malaysia

City Stadium
- Stadium Bandaraya Pulau Pinang (Malay)
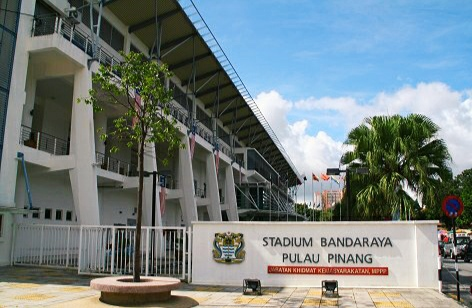

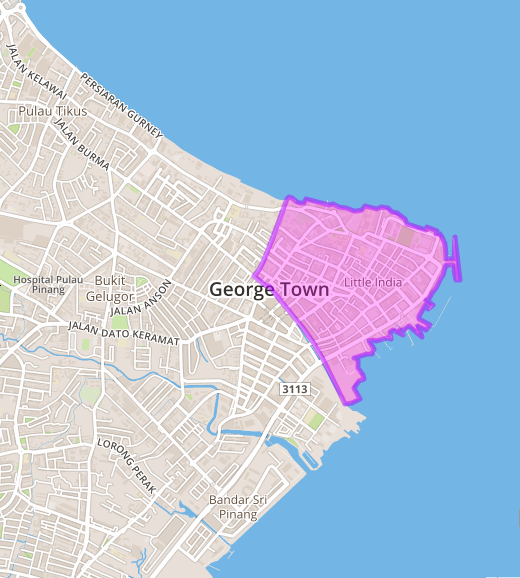
- Location in George Town
- Former names: Penang Island National Stadium (1 October 1945–8 August 2003)
- Location: George Town, Penang, Malaysia
- Coordinates: 5.4117°N 100.3145°E
- Owner: Penang State Government
- Operator: Penang Island City Council
- Capacity: 20,000
- Surface: Grass pitch Track
- Field size: 110 m × 70 m (120 yd × 77 yd)

Construction
- Groundbreaking: 1 October 1945
- Built: 1 June 1948
- Opened: 1 September 1956
- Renovated: 1953, 2018
- Expanded: 1 May 1950
- Architect: British Government

Tenant
- Penang F.C. (1945–present)

The City Stadium is a multi-purpose stadium in George Town, Penang, Malaysia, and serves as the home stadium of the main Penang state football club, Penang F.C. The oldest built stadium still in use in Malaysia, it was built in 1932 by the British government. It is also well known for the vociferous home support, dubbed the "Keramat Roar".

The stadium was the site where Mohd Faiz Subri, a Penang FA player, scored a physics-defying free kick goal during a Malaysian Super League match in 2016. He was awarded the prestigious FIFA Puskás Award the following year for this particular effort.

== History ==
=== Penang Island National Stadium (1945–2003) ===
Construction of the City Stadium commenced on 1 October 1945, just after the end of the Second World War. Upon completion in 1948, it was officially named the Penang Island National Stadium. The stadium was expanded by the British government in 1950 and underwent further renovation in 1953.

=== City Stadium (2003–present) ===
The Penang Island National Stadium was eventually renamed the City Stadium. Another round of renovation was conducted in the 2000s. However, as George Town had already been densely developed, under the confined urban constraints the City Stadium could not be expanded further. The Penang FA had briefly moved to the Penang State Stadium in Batu Kawan on the mainland due to capacity concerns, but in 2011 the state football team returned to the City Stadium.

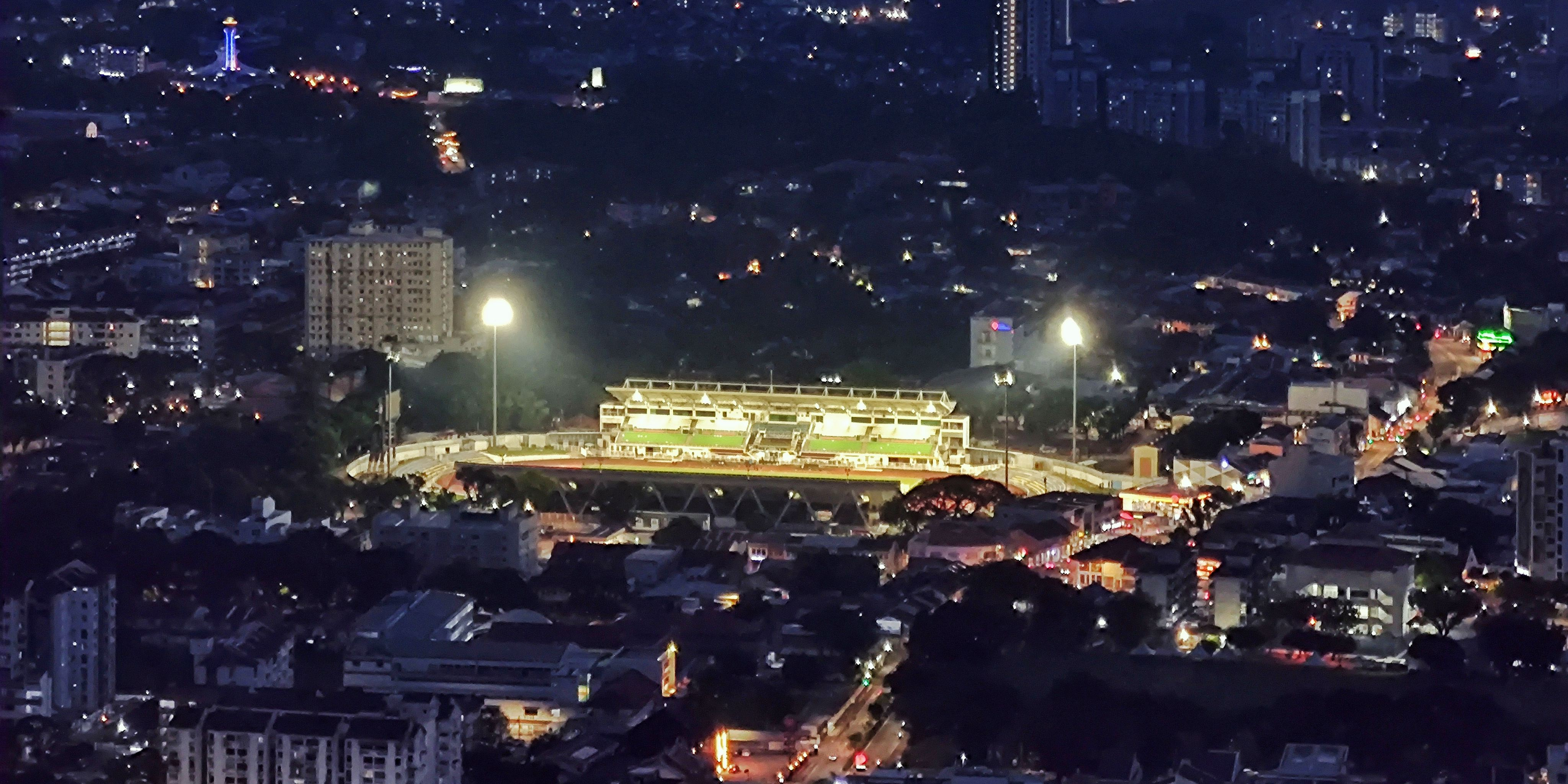
Night view of Penang City Stadium from the Komtar tower

== Notable matches ==
On 14 May 1975, the second exhibition match was played between the Malaysia League XI and Arsenal Football Club. The match ended in a 1–1 draw. Penang FA also played an exhibition match against BSC Young Boys (Switzerland) which ended in a 1–1 draw on 25 January 1982. Before that, on 12 January 1982, FC Bayern Munich II played versus Penang, which ended in a 1–0 win for the home side.

== International matches ==
| Date | Competition | Team 1 | Res. | Team 2 |
|---|---|---|---|---|
| 8 September 2004 | 2006 FIFA World Cup qualification – AFC second round | Malaysia | 0–1 | China |
