= Manzoor Azwira =

Malaysian professional association football player and coach

Personal information
- Full name: Manzoor Azwira bin Abdul Wahid
- Date of birth: 24 November 1976 (age 49)
- Place of birth: Penang, Malaysia
- Position: Midfielder

Team information
- Current team: Penang (assistant manager)

Youth career
- 1994–1996: Penang Youth

Senior career*
Years	Team	Apps	(Gls)
1996–1997	Penang		
1998	TM Melaka		
1999–2001	Perlis		
2002–2003	Kedah		
2004–2007	Perlis		
2007–2009	Kuala Muda Naza		
2010–2011	USM		

International career
1993	Malaysia U23		

Managerial career
- 2010–2012: USM (player-assistant coach)
- 2013–2016: Penang (assistant)
- 2016: Penang (caretaker)
- 2017: Penang U-21
- 2018: MOF
- 2019: Perlis Northern Lions
- 2019–2020: Penang
- 2021–2022: Penang (assistant)
- 2022–2023: Penang (caretaker)
- 2022–2023: Penang (assistant)
- 2024–: Penang II
- * Club domestic league appearances and goals

Manzoor Azwira Abdul Wahid is a Malaysia professional football coach and former player, who is the current assistant manager of Malaysia Super League club Penang.

Manzoor was a midfielder in his playing era. Starting his playing career with Penang from 1996 to 1997, he spent the majority of his career with Perlis for two different stints, forming a part of Perlis Golden Era team that won the club's first league title in 2005, entering three successive Malaysia Cup finals from 2004 to 2006, which saw the team won twice in 2004 and 2006. He played for Kedah from 2002 to 2003 between his two stints with Perlis. After leaving Perlis, Manzoor had stints with Kuala Muda Naza in Kedah, and USM in Penang. He was also a member of Malaysian U23 national team that appeared at the 1993 Bangladesh President's Gold Cup.

After retiring as a player, Manzoor started his coaching career with USM as assistant coach, before joining Penang for the same role from 2013 to 2016 and caretaker for two months in 2016. Manzoor was selected as the head coach of Penang U21 in 2017. 2018 was his first season as first team head coach, he guided MOF to the semi-final stage of FAM League. In the following year, he was the head coach of Perlis Northern Lions until the club's bankruptcy in February.

Manzoor is the head coach of Penang from April 2019.

== Club career ==
=== Penang FA ===
Manzoor started representing Penang from 1996 after being promoted from the reserve team that he joined since 1994. He contributed to the success of Penang as the Malaysia FA Cup runner-up in 1997. In 1998, he made a shocking decision to retire from the M-League for two years, citing not being able to concentrate on football for that time and wanting to try and focus on a new career.

=== TM Melaka ===
However, he joined semi pro side TM Melaka in the same year, winning the league title and promotion to the second tier.

=== First Stint with Perlis ===
After playing for one season in the Malaysia FAM Cup, he plied his trade for Perlis for the next three seasons.

=== Kedah ===
He played for Kedah from 2002 to 2003 and won the 2002 Liga Perdana 2.

=== Second Stint with Perlis ===
In his second stint with Perlis in 2004, he won the Malaysia Cup trophy which was meaningful to him and the club as it was a late birthday present for him and the first Malaysia Cup title for Perlis. In July 2005, Manzoor scored a goal that secured the team's first ever top flight title in front of their home crowd. The 2006 season was proved to be a successful one as Manzoor won the Malaysia Cup with Perlis once again in 2006, this time as the team's captain, which eventually saw them to lift the Malaysia Charity Shield trophy for the first time. He also scored a goal in the 2006 AFC Cup, the Asian version of UEFA Europa League, against New Radiant from Maldives. However, Perlis ended their first AFC Cup campaign in the group stage.

=== Kuala Muda Naza ===
In 2007, he left Perlis for the second time to join Kuala Muda Naza, he helped the team to win the league and promotion to the next season's Malaysia Super League and was retained for that season.

=== USM ===
He backed to his hometown to join the newly promoted Malaysia Premier League's team, USM. He successfully helped the university side to avoid relegation for two seasons before retiring at the end of 2011.

== International career ==
Manzoor was part of the Malaysia U23 squad that participated in the 1993 Bangladesh President's Gold Cup, which saw Malaysia eliminated from the group stage.

== Coaching career ==
=== Assistant coach ===
==== USM F.C. ====
After his retirement as a player, he joined USM's coaching team, assisting S. Veloo in the 2012 Malaysia Premier League.

==== Penang FA ====
Due to the withdrawal of USM in the 2013 season, Manzoor joined former teammate and Penang's legend, Merzagua Abderrazak's coaching setup, winning the Malaysia FAM League title thus promoted to the Malaysia Premier League. Manzoor worked under K. Devan and Jacksen F. Tiago for the 2014 and 2015 seasons respectively, in which the latter guided the team's promotion to 2016 Malaysia Super League.

In April 2016, he was appointed as the caretaker for Penang after Jacksen stepped down as head coach. However, Penang failed to win under his six-match tenure.

He continued his role in Penang as assistant coach after the arrival of Nenad Bacina for the rest of the 2016 season.

=== Head coach ===
==== Penang U21 ====
He took charge of the Penang President Cup's team for the 2017 season. He guided Penang to 6 wins from 18 matches and placed sixth from 10 teams in Group A.

==== MOF F.C. ====
Manzoor signed his first senior team coaching contract in 2018 with MOF F.C., replacing Razip Ismail. Under his guidance, he led the club to the semi-final stage of the 2018 Malaysia FAM Cup, before eliminated by the champions, Terengganu City F.C.

==== Perlis Northern Lions F.C. ====
In October 2018, Manzoor was announced as the inaugural head coach of the rebranded Perlis Northern Lions. His time with the club only lasted for four months due to the suspension of the club from Malaysian Football League because of financial crisis.

==== Penang ====
Manzoor was announced as the head coach for his childhood club, Penang in April 2019, replacing Ahmad Yusof. Penang climbed up to 3rd place from 8th place under his guidance, but eventually missing out promotion because the club was docked six points by FIFA.

== Personal life ==
Manzoor completed his secondary education in SMK Guar Perahu, Bukit Mertajam.

== Managerial Statistics ==
As of 17 May 2022

Managerial record by club and tenure
Team	From	To	Record					Ref.
Team	From	To	M	W	D	L	Win %	Ref.
Penang (caretaker)	7 April 2016	25 May 2016	6	0	2	4	0.0	
Penang U21	1 December 2016	30 November 2017	18	6	5	7	33.3	
MOF	24 April 2018	16 October 2018	16	8	4	4	50.0	
Perlis Northern Lions	17 October 2018	20 February 2019	3	1	0	2	33.3	
Penang F.C.	18 April 2019	3 December 2020	30	16	8	6	53.3	
Penang F.C. (caretaker)	5 May 2022	present	3	1	0	2	33.3	
Total			76	32	19	25	42.1	

== Honours ==
=== Player ===
TM Melaka

- Malaysia FAM Cup: 1998

Kedah

- Malaysia Premier League: 2002

Perlis

- Malaysia Cup: 2004, 2006
- Malaysia Super League: 2005
- Malaysia Charity Shield: 2007

Kuala Muda Naza

- Malaysia Premier League: 2007-08

=== Coach ===
Penang

- Malaysia FAM League: 2013 (assistant coach)
- Malaysia Premier League: 2020
