= 2014 Negeri Sembilan FA season =

Negeri Sembilan
2014 season
- President: Mohammad Hassan
- Manager: Mohammad Hassan
- Head Coach: V. Sundramoorthy
- Stadium: Tuanku Abdul Rahman Stadium
- Malaysia Premier League: 6th
- FA Cup: First round
- Malaysia Cup: Play-off
- Top goalscorer: League: Kim Jin-yong (8); All: Kim Jin-yong (8)
- Highest home attendance: 3,000 vs Kedah (23 May 2014)
- Lowest home attendance: 1,500 vs PBAPP (18 April 2014) vs Johor Darul Ta'zim II (13 June 2014) vs PDRM (20 June 2014)
- Average home league attendance: 2,000
Home colours	Away colours	Third colours

The 2014 season was the Negeri Sembilan's 91st season in club history and 3rd season in Malaysia Premier League since it was first introduced in 2004. Also it was the first season in the Malaysia Premier League after relegated from Malaysia Super League in 2013 season.

== Review ==
=== Pre-season ===
Negeri Sembilan do a massive reshuffle after the club knocked out from 2014 Malaysia Super League. The first step that has been taken by PBNS is to induct V. Sundramoorthy as a Head Coach.

== Club ==
=== Coaching staff ===
Position	Staff
Chairman	(Malaysia) Dato' Seri Utama Mohammad Hassan
Honorable Secretary	(Malaysia) Dato' Haji Abd. Halim bin Haji Abd. Latif
General Manager	(Malaysia) Dato' Seri Utama Mohammad Hassan
Assistant Manager	(Malaysia) Dato' Haji Abdul Halim bin Haji Abdul Latif
Assistant Manager	(Malaysia) Dato' Haslah Mohamad Amin
Assistant Manager	(Malaysia) Dato' Abdul Ghani Haji Hassan
Assistant Manager	(Malaysia) Dato' Haji Mohammed Najeeb Abdullah
Head Team Coach	(Singapore) V. Sundramoorthy
Assistant Coach	(Malaysia) Ridzuan Abu Shah
Assistant Coach	(Malaysia) Ahmad Osman
Goalkeeping Coach	(Malaysia) Yazid Yassin
Fitness Coach	(Singapore) K. Balagumaran
Physiotherapist	(Malaysia) Dr. Rozaiman Ebrahim (Malaysia) Zulkefli Abu Samah

Last updated: January

=== Kit Manufacturers & Financial Sponsor ===
Nation	Corporation
Main sponsors
(Malaysia)	Matrix Concept Group
Shirt sponsors
(Malaysia)	Kika

== Players ==
=== Full Squad ===
No.	Name	Age	Nationality	Position(s)	Join	Signed From	Date of Birth	Notes
Goalkeepers
1	Mohd Yatim Abdullah	22	(Malaysia)	GK	2014	Negeri Sembilan FA U21	12 Dis. 1992	
21	Kaharuddin Rahman	23	(Malaysia)	GK	2012	Negeri Sembilan FA U21	7 Aug. 1991	
22	Badrulzaman Abdul Halim	36	(Malaysia)	GK	2012	(Selangor) PKNS F.C.	2 Apr. 1978	
Defenders
2	Mohd Fauzi Nan	34	(Malaysia)	RB / CB	2013	Kedah FA	20 Jan. 1980	Vice-captain
3	Tengku Qayyum Ubaidillah Tengku Ahmad	28	(Malaysia)	LB	2007	Negeri Sembilan FA U21	5 Mar. 1986	
4	Jean Alexandre	28	(Haiti)	CB	2014	(United States) Orlando City	24 Aug. 1986	Import
5	Norhafiz Zamani Misbah	33	(Malaysia)	CB / DM	2011	(Kuala Lumpur) PLUS F.C.	15 July 1981	Captain
6	Mohd Radzuan Abdullah	23	(Malaysia)	CB	2013	Negeri Sembilan FA U21	18 Aug. 1991	
13	K. Nanthakumar	37	(Malaysia)	CB / DM / CM	2014	Kelantan FA	13 Oct. 1977	
17	Mohd Alif Shamsudin	28	(Malaysia)	RB / DM	2009	Negeri Sembilan FA U21	1 Feb. 1986	
18	Muszaki Abu Bakar	25	(Malaysia)	RB / DM	2014	Free Agent	15 Mar. 1989	
20	Dzaiddin Zainudin	22	(Malaysia)	LB / DM	2014	(Kuala Lumpur) DRB-Hicom F.C.	4 Aug. 1992	
23	Mohd Nizam Abu Bakar	30	(Malaysia)	RB	2014	(Kuala Lumpur) Felda United F.C.	16 Sep. 1984	
24	Sumardi Hajalan	29	(Malaysia)	LB	2014	Sabah FA	12/1/85	
26	Mohd Zulfaizham Kamis	24	(Malaysia)	LB	2012	Kedah FA	17 Aug. 1990	
31	Segar Arumugam	21	(Malaysia)	LB / LW	2014	Negeri Sembilan FA U21	3 Jan. 1993	
Midfielders
8	Abdul Halim Zainal	26	(Malaysia)	DM / CM / AM	2008	Negeri Sembilan FA U21	29 July 1988	
9	Eddy Helmi Abdul Manan	35	(Malaysia)	RW / LW	2013	Johor Darul Ta'zim F.C.	8 Dis. 1979	
11	Mohd Shoufiq Khusaini	25	(Malaysia)	RW / LW	2014	Johor Darul Ta'zim II F.C.	9 July 1989	
12	G. Puaneswaran	31	(Malaysia)	RW / LW	2014	Terengganu FA	27 May 1983	
14	V. Kavi Chelvan	25	(Malaysia)	RW / LW	2014	Selangor FA	2 July 1989	
15	Kim Jin-yong	32	(South Korea)	DM / CM / AM / CB	2014	(South Korea) Gangwon FC	9 Oct. 1982	Import
16	S. Sivanesan	24	(Malaysia)	DM / CM / AM / RW	2013	(Kuala Lumpur) Felda United F.C.	28 Dis. 1990	
19	M. Sivakumar	30	(Malaysia)	DM / CM	2014	Perak FA	6 Mar. 1984	
33	Thanabalan Nadarajah	19	(Malaysia)	RW / LW	2014	Negeri Sembilan FA U21	25 Feb. 1995	
Forwards
7	Mohd Firdaus Azizul	26	(Malaysia)	ST / RW / LW	2008	Negeri Sembilan FA U21	3 Jan. 1988	
27	Ivan Babić	30	(Croatia)	ST	2014	Free Agent	29 Apr. 1984	Import
30	Philani Kubheka	35	(South Africa)	ST	2014	(Vietnam) Becamex Bình Dương F.C.	18 May 1979	Import

== Transfers ==
=== Disember ===
In

No.	Pos.	Name	Age	From	Notes
1	GK	(Malaysia) Mohd Yatim Abdullah	22	Negeri Sembilan U21	Promoted
4	DF	(Haiti) Jean Alexandre	28	(United States) Orlando City	Import
10	FW	(Cameroon) Jean-Emmanuel Effa Owona	31	Terengganu FA	Import
11	MF	(Malaysia) Mohd Shoufiq Khusaini	25	Johor Darul Ta'zim II F.C.	
12	MF	(Malaysia) G. Puaneswaran	31	Terengganu FA	
13	DF	(Malaysia) K. Nanthakumar	37	Kelantan FA	
14	MF	(Malaysia) V. Kavi Chelvan	25	Selangor FA	
15	MF	(South Korea) Kim Jin-Ryong	32	(South Korea) Gangwon FC	Import
18	DF	(Malaysia) Muszaki Abu Bakar	25	Free Agent	
19	MF	(Malaysia) M. Sivakumar	30	Perak FA	
20	DF	(Malaysia) Dzaiddin Zainuddin	22	(Kuala Lumpur) DRB-Hicom F.C.	
23	DF	(Malaysia) Mohd Nizam Abu Bakar	30	(Kuala Lumpur) Felda United F.C.	
24	DF	(Malaysia) Sumardi Hajalan	29	Sabah FA	
25	FW	(Czechoslovakia) Jozef Kapláň	28	(Singapore) Geylang International FC	Import
31	DF	(Malaysia) Segar Arumugam	21	Negeri Sembilan U21	Promoted
33	MF	(Malaysia) Thanabalan Nadarajah	19	Negeri Sembilan U21	Promoted

Out

No.	Pos.	Name	Age	To	Notes
4	FW	(Malaysia) Mohd Amirul Omar	28	(Malacca) Melaka United F.C.	
6	DF	(Cameroon) William Modibo	35	(Thailand) Osotspa Saraburi F.C.	Import
7	MF	(Malaysia) Idris Abdul Karim	38	Retired	
8	MF	(Malaysia) Norismaidham Ismail	30	Perlis FA	
9	MF	(Malaysia) Shahurain Abu Samah	28	(Kuala Lumpur) Felda United F.C.	
13	DF	(Malaysia) Abdul Ghani Rahman	29	(Selangor) PKNS F.C.	
14	FW	(Malaysia) Mohd Alafi Mahmud	29	PDRM FA	
15	MF	(Malaysia) Rashid Mahmud	36	(Malacca) Melaka United F.C.	
18	DF	(Malaysia) Mohd Fadhil Mohd Hashim	31	PDRM FA	
20	FW	(Brazil) Fábio Leandro Barbosa	36	Retired	Import
21	GK	(Malaysia) Mohd Hamsani Ahmad	38	Selangor FA	
23	MF	(Malaysia) Nazrin Nawi	26	Johor Darul Ta'zim F.C.	
25	FW	(Malaysia) Ahmad Shakir Mohd Ali	25	Kelantan FA	
26	FW	(Malaysia) Mohd Rahizi Mohd Rasib	20	Negeri Sembilan FA U21	Demoted
29	MF	(Malaysia) Muhamad Bukhairi Idris	22	(Malacca) Melaka United F.C.	
30	DF	(Malaysia) Fiqri Azwan Ghazali	22	Putrajaya SPA F.C.	

=== April ===
In

No.	Pos.	Name	Age	From	Notes
27	FW	(Croatia) Ivan Babić	30	Free Agent	Import
30	FW	(South Africa) Philani Kubheka	35	(Vietnam) Becamex Bình Dương F.C.	Import

Out

No.	Pos.	Name	Age	To	Notes
10	FW	(Cameroon) Jean-Emmanuel Effa Owona	31	Free Agent	Import
25	FW	(Czechoslovakia) Jozef Kapláň	28	(Singapore) Tampines Rovers FC	Import

== Non-competitive ==
=== Pre-season ===
Win Draw Loss

19 November 2013 1	Negeri Sembilan FA	2 – 1	(Kuala Lumpur) DRB-Hicom F.C.	Paroi
20:45	Mohd Nizam Abu Bakar; V. Kavi Chelvan		Goal	Stadium: Tuanku Abdul Rahman Stadium

26 November 2013 2	Negeri Sembilan FA	0 – 0	(Selangor) PKNS F.C.	Paroi
20:45				Stadium: Tuanku Abdul Rahman Stadium

28 November 2013 3	Negeri Sembilan FA	1 – 1	Putrajaya SPA F.C.	Paroi
20:45	Mohd Nizam Abu Bakar		Goal	Stadium: Tuanku Abdul Rahman Stadium

2 December 2013 4	Negeri Sembilan FA	3 – 0	PDRM FA	Paroi
20:45	Jozef Kapláň; G. Puaneswaran; Kim Jin-yong			Stadium: Tuanku Abdul Rahman Stadium

7 December 2013 5	Malacca United F.C.	0 – 1	Negeri Sembilan	Malacca
17:45			Jozef Kapláň	Stadium: Hang Jebat Stadium

10 December 2013 6	Negeri Sembilan FA	1 – 0	ATM FA	Paroi
20:45	Jozef Kapláň			Stadium: Tuanku Abdul Rahman Stadium

27 December 2013 7	Negeri Sembilan FA	1 – 1	(Kuala Lumpur) DRB-Hicom F.C.	Paroi
17:30	Jozef Kapláň		Goal	Stadium: Tuanku Abdul Rahman Stadium

3 January 2014 8	ATM FA	3 – 0	Negeri Sembilan FA	Subang
17:30	Juan Arostegui; Marlon Alex James			Stadium: RMAF

7 January 2014 9	Sime Darby F.C. (Kuala Lumpur)	1 – 1	Negeri Sembilan FA	Bukit Jelutong
20:45	Goal		Goal	Stadium: Sime Darby FC Training Ground

10 January 2014 10	Negeri Sembilan FA	2 – 0	ATM FA	Paroi
20:45	Jozef Kapláň			Stadium: Tuanku Abdul Rahman Stadium

15 January 2014 11	Negeri Sembilan FA	3 - 0	Geylang International FC	Paroi
20:45	Jean Alexandre; Mohd Shoufiq Khusaini; G. Puaneswaran			Stadium: Tuanku Abdul Rahman Stadium

=== Friendly ===
Win Draw Loss

1 February 2014 1	Negeri Sembilan FA	3 - 2	(Kuala Lumpur) Sime Darby F.C.	Paroi
16:45	Norhafiz Zamani Misbah; Effa Owona		Farderin Kadir; Mohd Farid Ramli	Stadium: Tuanku Abdul Rahman Stadium

== Competitions ==
Win Draw Loss

=== Malaysia Premier League ===
==== League table ====
Pos	Team	Pld	W	D	L	GF	GA	GD	Pts
4	Kedah	22	11	5	6	43	25	+18	38
5	Johor Darul Ta'zim II	22	9	8	5	30	26	+4	35
6	Negeri Sembilan	22	8	6	8	26	28	−2	30
7	DRB-Hicom	22	6	5	11	32	34	−2	23
8	Sabah	22	6	5	11	21	30	−9	23

Source: FAM Official Site, Astro Arena
Rules for classification: 1) Points; 2) Goal difference; 3) Number of goals scored

==== Matches ====
Win Draw Loss

24 January 2014 1	Negeri Sembilan FA	2 - 1	(Kuala Lumpur) DRB-Hicom F.C.	Paroi
20:45	Jozef Kapláň 34', 53'		58' Ogunboye Iyanu Ezekiel	Stadium: Tuanku Abdul Rahman Stadium; Attendance: 2,000; Referee: Sani Tari

27 January 2014 2	Pulau Pinang PBAPP (Penang)	0 - 0	Negeri Sembilan FA	Georgetown
20:45				Stadium: Bandaraya Stadium; Attendance: 500; Referee: Tiong Eng Tai

7 February 2014 3	Negeri Sembilan FA	2 - 1	(Kuala Lumpur) Felda United F.C.	Paroi
20:45	Effa Owona 21'; S. Sivanesan 32'		68' Indra Putra Mahayuddin	Stadium: Tuanku Abdul Rahman Stadium; Attendance: 2,500; Referee: Mohd Zohri Tajudin

10 February 2014 4	Sabah FA	2 - 1	Negeri Sembilan FA	Kota Kinabalu
20:45	Mohd Ezaidy Khadar 16'; Mohd Farid Ideris 22'		12' Effa Owona	Stadium: Likas Stadium; Attendance: 4,500

14 February 2014 5	Kedah FA	0 - 1	Negeri Sembilan FA	Alor Setar
20:45			58' Effa Owona	Stadium: Darul Aman Stadium; Referee: Mohd Jeffri Zolkifli

7 March 2014 6	Negeri Sembilan FA	0 - 0	Putrajaya SPA F.C.	Paroi
20:45				Stadium: Tuanku Abdul Rahman Stadium; Attendance: 2,000; Referee: Jeevanathan A/L M. Ponniamoorty

14 March 2014 7	Johor Darul Ta'zim II F.C.	2 - 0	Negeri Sembilan FA	Pasir Gudang
20:45	Shahril Ishak 52'; Braulio Nóbrega 72'			Stadium: Pasir Gudang Corporation Stadium; Attendance: 5,500; Referee: Zulkifli Ahmad

21 March 2014 8	Negeri Sembilan FA	1 - 3	Penang FA	Paroi
20:45	Kim Jin-Ryong 10'		14', 26' Mohd Baser Napae; 33' Hilton Moreira	Stadium: Tuanku Abdul Rahman Stadium; Attendance: 2,000; Referee: Azman Jamaludin

24 March 2014 9	PDRM FA	2 - 2	Negeri Sembilan FA	Selangor
16:45	Charles Souza Chad 48' (pen.) Rafael Souza Silva Novais 83'		2' Jean-Emmanuel Effa Owona; 73' S. Sivanesan	Stadium: Petaling Jaya Stadium; Attendance: 300; Referee: Sani Tari

28 March 2014 10	Negeri Sembilan FA	1 - 0	(Selangor) UiTM F.C.	Paroi
20:45	Kim Jin-Ryong 26'			Stadium: Tuanku Abdul Rahman Stadium; Attendance: 2,000; Referee: Azaham Musa

4 April 2014 11	Perlis FA	0 - 1	Negeri Sembilan FA	Alor Star
20:45			45+2' Kim Jin-Ryong	Stadium: Darul Aman Stadium; Attendance: 50; Referee: Mohd Jefri Zolkefli

11 April 2014 12	Negeri Sembilan FA	2 - 0	Perlis FA	Paroi
20:45	Kim Jin-Ryong 13'; Jozef Kapláň 79'			Stadium: Tuanku Abdul Rahman Stadium; Attendance: 2,000; Referee: Mohd Nafeez Abd Wahab

14 April 2014 13	DRB-Hicom F.C. (Kuala Lumpur)	1 - 3	Negeri Sembilan FA	Malacca
16:45	Ashadi Mohd Yusoff 46'		34' Kim Jin-Ryong; 38' S. Sivanesan; 56' Jozef Kapláň	Stadium: Hang Jebat Stadium; Attendance: 150; Referee: Azman Jamalludin

18 April 2014 14	Negeri Sembilan FA	2 – 0	(Penang) Pulau Pinang PBAPP	Paroi
20:45	Ivan Babić 45+1'; Kim Jin-Ryong 51'			Stadium: Tuanku Abdul Rahman Stadium; Attendance: 1,500; Referee: Ramli Mat Dahan

9 May 2014 15	Felda United F.C. (Kuala Lumpur)	1 – 0	Negeri Sembilan FA	Selayang
16:45	Indra Putra Mahayuddin 77'			Stadium: Majlis Perbandaran Selayang Stadium; Attendance: 1,000; Referee: Muhammad Nazmi Nasaruddin

16 May 2014 16	Negeri Sembilan FA	0 – 1	Sabah FA	Paroi
20:45			65' Marwan Sayedeh	Stadium: Tuanku Abdul Rahman Stadium; Attendance: 2,000

23 May 2014 17	Negeri Sembilan FA	1 – 2	Kedah FA	Paroi
20:45	Jean Alexandre 86'		3' Billy Mehmet; 31' Namgung Woong	Stadium: Tuanku Abdul Rahman Stadium; Attendance: 3,000; Referee: Zamzaidi Katimin

9 June 2014 18	Putrajaya SPA F.C.	3 – 3	Negeri Sembilan FA	Malacca
20:45	Guy Bwele 18', 61'; Eddy Viator 90+7(pen)'		17' S. Sivanesan; 69' Ivan Babić; 82(pen)' Kim Jin-Ryong	Stadium: Hang Jebat Stadium; Attendance: 200

13 June 2014 19	Negeri Sembilan FA	2 – 2	Johor Darul Ta'zim II F.C.	Paroi
20:45	Mohd Nizam Abu Bakar 67'; Ivan Babić 58'		26' Izuan Jarudin; 60' Mohd Azinee Taib	Stadium: Tuanku Abdul Rahman Stadium; Attendance: 1,500; Referee: Zulkarnain Zakaria

16 June 2014 20	Penang FA	2 – 1	Negeri Sembilan FA	Georgetown
20:45	Lee Kil-Hoon 20', 31'		30' Kim Jin-Ryong	Stadium: Bandaraya Stadium; Attendance: 5,000; Referee: Shamsudin Ibrahim

20 June 2014 21	Negeri Sembilan FA	0 – 4	PDRM FA	Paroi
20:45			7' Bobby Gonzales; 40' Mohd Fauzi Abdul Majid; 49' Ali Ashfaq; 71' Mohd Shahril Izwan Abdullah	Stadium: Tuanku Abdul Rahman Stadium; Attendance: 1,500; Referee: Ramli Mat Dahan

24 June 2014 22	UiTM F.C. (Selangor)	1 – 1	Negeri Sembilan FA	Shah Alam
16:45	Obi Ikechukwu Charles 14'		79' Jean Alexandre	Stadium: UiTM Stadium; Attendance: 150; Referee: Kamal Ahmad

=== Malaysia FA Cup ===
==== Knockout stage ====
Win Draw Loss

21 January 2014 First round	Negeri Sembilan FA	0 - 1	(Kuala Lumpur) Felda United F.C.	Paroi
20:45			Muhammad Shukor Adan 72'	Stadium: Tuanku Abdul Rahman Stadium; Referee: Mohd Fairurazi Mat Desa

=== Malaysia Cup ===
==== Play-off ====
Win Draw Loss

28 June 2014 Play-off	T-Team F.C. (Terengganu)	1 – 0	Negeri Sembilan FA	Shah Alam
21:30	Ramzul Zahini Adnan 42'	Report		Stadium: Shah Alam Stadium

== Season statistics ==
=== Top scorers ===
Rnk	Pos	No.	Player	Premier League	FA Cup	Malaysia Cup	Total
1	MF	15	(South Korea) Kim Jin-yong	8	0	0	8
2	FW	10	(Cameroon) Jean-Emmanuel Effa Owona	4	0	0	4
2	FW	25	(Czechoslovakia) Jozef Kapláň	4	0	0	4
2	MF	16	(Malaysia) S. Sivanesan	4	0	0	4
3	FW	27	(Croatia) Ivan Babić	3	0	0	3
4	DF	4	(Haiti) Jean-Marc Alexandre	2	0	0	2
5	DF	23	(Malaysia) Mohd Nizam Abu Bakar	1	0	0	1
Own goals				0	0	0	0
TOTALS				26	0	0	26

=== Disciplinary record ===
J	Pos	Nat.	Player	Premier League			FA Cup			Malaysia Cup			Total			Notes
J	Pos	Nat.	Player	Yellow card	Double yellow card	Red card	Yellow card	Double yellow card	Red card	Yellow card	Double yellow card	Red card	Yellow card	Double yellow card	Red card	Notes
8	MF	(Malaysia)	Abdul Halim Zainal	5	1								5	1		
15	MF	(South Korea)	Kim Jin-yong	4									4			
4	DF	(Haiti)	Jean-Marc Alexandre	4									4			
22	GK	(Malaysia)	Badrulzaman Abdul Halim	3									3			
2	DF	(Malaysia)	Mohd Fauzi Nan	3									3			
13	DF	(Malaysia)	K. Nanthakumar	3									3			
9	MF	(Malaysia)	Eddy Helmi Abdul Manan	3									3			
27	FW	(Croatia)	Ivan Babić	3									3			
11	MF	(Malaysia)	Shoufiq Khusaini	2									2			
25	FW	(Czechoslovakia)	Jozef Kapláň	1			1						2			
19	MF	(Malaysia)	M. Sivakumar	2									2			
23	DF	(Malaysia)	Mohd Nizam Abu Bakar	2									2			
3	DF	(Malaysia)	Tengku Qayyum Ubaidillah	2									2			
10	FW	(Cameroon)	Jean-Emmanuel Effa Owona	1									1			
18	DF	(Malaysia)	Muszaki Abu Bakar	1									1			
31	DF	(Malaysia)	Segar Arumugam	1									1			

= Number of bookings; = Number of sending offs after a second yellow card; = Number of sending offs by a direct red card.
