= 2014 Malaysia Premier League =

Liga Premier
- Season: 2014
- Champions: PDRM; 2nd title
- Promoted: PDRM; Felda United
- Relegated: Perlis; PBAPP
- Matches played: 126
- Goals scored: 377 (2.99 per match)
- Top goalscorer: Edward Wilson(19 goals)
- Biggest home win: Felda United 8–0 UiTM (20 June 2014)
- Biggest away win: PBAPP 2–7 Kedah (9 May 2014)
- Highest scoring: PBAPP 2–7 Kedah (9 May 2014)
- Longest winning run: 7 games PDRM
- Longest unbeaten run: 19 games PDRM
- Longest winless run: 11 games PBAPP
- Longest losing run: 5 games Perlis
- Highest attendance: 14,000; Penang 4–1 Johor Darul Takzim II (4 April 2014)
- Lowest attendance: 120; Perlis 0–1 KL SPA (27 January 2014)
- Average attendance: 2,687

The 2014 Liga Premier (English: 2014 Premier League), also known as the Astro Liga Premier for sponsorship reasons, was the ninth season of the Liga Premier, the second-tier professional football league in Malaysia.

The season was held from 24 January 2014.

The Liga Premier champions for 2014 season was PDRM. The champions and runners-up were both promoted to 2015 Liga Super.

== Changes from last season ==
=== Team changes ===
==== To Liga Super ====
Promoted from 2013 Liga Premier

- Sarawak
- Sime Darby

Relegated from 2013 Liga Super

- Felda United
- Negeri Sembilan

==== From Malaysia FAM League ====
Relegated to 2014 Malaysia FAM League

- Betaria
- Kuala Lumpur

Promoted to 2014 Liga Premier

- Penang
- PBAPP

=== Rule changes ===
- A total of 4 foreign players can be registered by Premier League teams, including at least one player from AFC countries. A maximum of 3 foreign players can be fielded at one time in a match. The announcement was made by FAM during the exco meeting in November 2013, following a decision to upgrade the foreign players quota from 2 in 2013 to 3 in the April 2013 meeting.

=== Name Changes ===
- Pos Malaysia were renamed to DRB-Hicom
- Johor FA were renamed to Johor Darul Takzim II

== Teams ==
A total of 12 teams are contesting the league, including 8 sides from the 2013 season, two promoted from the 2013 Malaysia FAM League and two relegated from 2013 Liga Super.

On 27 May 2013, Penang earned promotion from the 2013 Malaysia FAM League. They returned to the second division after being absent for 2 years. This is the second season that Penang are in the Premier League. This was followed by neighbours, PBAPP. The two teams replace Betaria and Kuala Lumpur who were all relegated to the 2014 Malaysia FAM League.

Felda United and Negeri Sembilan were relegated from 2013 Liga Super. They are replacing Sarawak and Sime Darby who get promotion to 2014 Liga Super.

== Locations ==
Locations of the 2014 Liga Premier teams

== Stadiums ==
Team	City	Stadium location	Name	Capacity
DRB-Hicom	Kuala Lumpur	Paya Rumput	Hang Jebat Stadium	40,000
Felda United	Kuala Lumpur	Kelana Jaya	Petaling Jaya Stadium	25,000
Johor Darul Takzim II	Johor Bahru	Pasir Gudang	Pasir Gudang Corporation Stadium	15,000
Kedah	Alor Star	Alor Star	Darul Aman Stadium	32,387
Negeri Sembilan	Seremban	Seremban	Tuanku Abdul Rahman Stadium	40,000
PBAPP	George Town	George Town	Bandaraya Stadium	16,000
PDRM	Kuala Lumpur	Kelana Jaya	Petaling Jaya Stadium	40,000
Penang	George Town	George Town	Bandaraya Stadium	16,000
Perlis	Kangar	Alor Star	Darul Aman Stadium	32,387
Putrajaya SPA	Putrajaya	Paya Rumput	Hang Jebat Stadium	40,000
Sabah	Kota Kinabalu	Kota Kinabalu	Likas Stadium	30,000
UiTM	Shah Alam	Shah Alam	UiTM Stadium	10,000

== Personnel and sponsoring ==
Team	Coach	Captain	Kit manufacturer	Shirt sponsor
DRB-Hicom	(Malaysia) G. Torairaju	(Malaysia) Abdullah Yusof	Kappa	DRB-HICOM
Felda United	(Malaysia) Irfan Bakti Abu Salim	(Malaysia) Muhammad Shukor Adan	Puma	FGV
Johor Darul Takzim II	(Croatia) Rajko Magic	(Singapore) Shahril Ishak	Nike	Jcorp
Kedah	(Malaysia) Tan Cheng Hoe	(Malaysia) Baddrol Bakhtiar	Line 7	PKNK
Negeri Sembilan	(Singapore) V. Sundramoorthy	(Malaysia) Norhafiz Zamani Misbah	Kika	Matrix Concepts
PBAPP	(Malaysia) Yunus Alif	(Malaysia) Mat Saiful Mohammad	Joma	PBA Pulau Pinang
PDRM	(Malaysia) Dollah Salleh	(Malaysia) Mohd Afif Amiruddin	Kappa	Perkasa Jauhari
Penang	(Malaysia) K. Devan	(Malaysia) Mohd Azizan Baba	Umbro	ASPEN Group
Perlis	(Malaysia) Reduan Abdullah	(Malaysia) S. Suvinart	Xtep	Canggih
Putrajaya SPA	(Malaysia) Mohd Shah Alias Norbit	(Malaysia) Sazali Suwandi	Erreà	SPA
Sabah	(Bosnia and Herzegovina) Milomir Šešlija	(Malaysia) Julamri Muhammad	Carino	Grace One
UiTM	(Malaysia) Azuan Zain	(Malaysia) Muhammad Ashraf Zulkapli	Umbro	KPT

== Coaching changes ==
Team	Outgoing coach	Manner of departure	Date of vacancy	Incoming coach	Date of appointment
Penang	(Morocco) Merzagua Abderrazak			(Malaysia) K. Devan	
Perlis	(Malaysia) Yunus Alif			(Malaysia) Reduan Abdullah	
Sabah	(Malaysia) Johnny Dominicus			(Bosnia and Herzegovina) Milomir Šešlija	
PDRM	(Malaysia) R. Nalathamby			(Malaysia) Dollah Salleh	
PBAPP	(Malaysia) Zabidi Hassan			(Malaysia) Yunus Alif	
Negeri Sembilan	(Malaysia) Ridzuan Abu Shah			(Singapore) V. Sundramoorthy	
Kedah	(Croatia) Marijo Tot			(Australia) Dave Mitchell	
Felda United	(Malaysia) K. Devan			(Malaysia) Irfan Bakti Abu Salim	
Kedah	(Australia) Dave Mitchell			(Malaysia) Tan Cheng Hoe	

== Foreign players ==
Team	Country 1	Country 2	Country 3	Asian player
DRB-Hicom	(Nigeria) Ogunboye Iyanu Ezekiel	(Australia) Mohammad Naeem Rahimi	(Australia) Emile Damey	(South Korea) Kwon Jun
Felda United	(Australia) Ndumba Makeche	(Liberia) Zah Rahan Krangar	(Liberia) Edward Junior Wilson	(Uzbekistan) Yaroslav Krushelnitskiy
Johor Darul Takzim II	(Argentina) Nicolás Delmonte	(Spain) Braulio Nóbrega	(Spain) Juan Manuel Carrasco	(Singapore) Shahril Ishak
Kedah	(South Korea) Namgung Woong	(Republic of Ireland) Billy Mehmet	(Spain) José Franco Gómez	(Australia) Adam Griffiths
Negeri Sembilan	(Croatia) Ivan Babić	(Haiti) Jean Alexandre	(South Africa) Philani	(South Korea) Kim Jin-Yong
PBAPP	(Russia) Boris Kochkin	(Uganda) Edrisar Kaye	(Uganda) Ochaya Silvus Luis	(Australia) Alexander Thomas Becerra
PDRM	(Brazil) Rafael	(Brazil) Charles Chad	(The Gambia) Mohamadou Sumareh	(Maldives) Ali Ashfaq
Penang	(Angola) Titi Buengo	(Brazil) Luiz Ricardo	(South Korea) Lee Kil-Hoon	(South Korea) Lee Kwang-Hyun
Perlis	(Morocco) Mourad Faris	(Ivory Coast) Dao Bakary	(Ivory Coast) Bamba Sinaly	(Thailand) Witthawin Klorwutthiwat
Putrajaya SPA	(Croatia) Alen Guć	(Guadeloupe) Eddy Viator	(Cameroon) Guy Bwele	(South Korea) Shin Hyun-Joon
Sabah	(Croatia) Predrag Pocuca	(Liberia) Jerome Suku Doe	(Brazil) Andrezinho	(Syria) Marwan Sayedeh
UiTM	(Nigeria) Obi Ikechukwu Charles	(Tanzania) Abdi Kassim Sadallah	(Angola) Eldon Maquemba	(South Korea) Bang Seung-Hwan

== League table ==
Pos	Team	Pld	W	D	L	GF	GA	GD	Pts	Promotion or relegation
1	PDRM (C, P)	22	16	4	2	63	23	+40	52	Promotion to Liga Super
2	Felda United (P)	22	15	5	2	58	26	+32	50	Promotion to Liga Super
3	Penang	22	13	5	4	41	30	+11	44	
4	Kedah	22	11	5	6	43	25	+18	38	
5	Johor Darul Ta'zim II	22	9	8	5	30	26	+4	35	
6	Negeri Sembilan	22	8	6	8	26	28	−2	30	
7	DRB-Hicom	22	6	5	11	32	34	−2	23	
8	Sabah	22	6	5	11	21	30	−9	23	
9	UiTM	22	5	7	10	22	28	−6	22	
10	SPA	22	5	7	10	23	41	−18	22	
11	Perlis (R)	22	2	6	14	21	50	−29	12	Relegation to Liga FAM
12	PBAPP (R)	22	1	6	15	16	45	−29	9	Relegation to Liga FAM

Source: FAM Official Site, Astro Arena
Rules for classification: 1) Points; 2) Goal difference; 3) Number of goals scored
(C) Champions; (P) Promoted; (R) Relegated

== Results ==
Fixtures and Results of the Liga Premier 2014 season.

=== Week 1 ===
Friday 24 January	Johor Darul Takzim II	1–3	(Malaysia) PDRM	Pasir Gudang Corporation Stadium, Pasir Gudang, Johor
	Braulio Nobrega 23'		Mohd Afif Amiruddin 59'; Bobby Gonzales 60'; Mohd Fadhil Mohd Hashim 62'	Referee: Mohd Zohri Tajudin (Melaka)

Friday 24 January	Kedah	4–1	Perlis	Darul Aman Stadium, Alor Star, Kedah
20:45 UTC+08:00	Baddrol Bakhtiar 32'; Billy Mehmet 36 (pen.)', 82'; Syazwan Zainon 44'		Mohd Farizal Rozali 22'	Referee: Kamal Ahmad (Kuala LUmpur)

Friday 24 January	Negeri Sembilan	2–1	(Kuala Lumpur) DRB-Hicom	Tuanku Abdul Rahman Stadium, Seremban, Negeri Sembilan
	Jozef Kaplan 33', 53'		Ogunboye Iyanu Ezekiel 58'	Attendance: 2,000; Referee: Sani Tari

Friday 24 January	Penang	3–1	Sabah	Bandaraya Stadium, Georgetown, Penang
20:45 UTC+08:00	Mohd Zharif Hasna 45', 64'; Hilton Moreira 61'		Rozaimi Abdul Rahman 11'	Attendance: 10,000; Referee: Samsudin Ibrahim (Terengganu)

Friday 24 January	Felda United (Kuala Lumpur)	1–1	(Penang) PBAPP	Petaling Jaya Stadium, Petaling Jaya, Selangor
	Edward Junior Wilson 76'		Muhamad Daud Zo 36'	Attendance: 800; Referee: Mohd Jefferi Zolkifli (Perak)

Friday 24 January	Putrajaya SPA	0–1	(Malaysia) UiTM	Hang Jebat Stadium, Malacca
			Obi Ikechukwu Charles 70'	Attendance: 100; Referee: Zulkifli Ahmad (Kuala Lumpur)

=== Week 2 ===
Monday 27 January	PDRM (Malaysia)	5–1	Penang	Petaling Jaya Stadium, Petaling Jaya, Selangor
	Bobby Gonzales 3'; Mohd Fadhil Mohd Hashim 26'; Mohd Shahril Izwan Abdullah 38'; Ali Ashfaq 59'; Charles Souza Chad 65'		Yong Kuong Yong 18'	Attendance: 350; Referee: Mohd Fairurazi Mat Desa (Perak)

Monday 27 January	UiTM (Malaysia)	1–1	Johor Darul Takzim II	UiTM Stadium, Shah Alam, Selangor
	Abdi Kassim Sadallah 12'		Mohd Azinee Taib 82'	Attendance: 300; Referee: Ramli Mat Dahan (Terengganu)

Monday 27 January	DRB-Hicom (Kuala Lumpur)	0–2	Kedah	Hang Jebat Stadium, Malacca
			Billy Mehmet 35', 90+4'	Attendance: 300; Referee: Muhd Almi Abdullah

Monday 27 January	Sabah	1–3	(Kuala Lumpur) Felda United	Likas Stadium, Kota Kinabalu, Sabah
	Rozaimi Abdul Rahman 19'		Zah Rahan Krangar 45'; Edward Junior Wilson 50', 77'	Attendance: 7,500; Referee: Azman Jamaudin

Monday 27 January	PBAPP (Penang)	0–0	Negeri Sembilan	Bandaraya Stadium, Georgetown, Penang
				Attendance: 500; Referee: Tiong Eng Tai

Monday 27 January	Perlis	0–1	Putrajaya SPA	Darul Aman Stadium, Alor Star, Kedah
			Khairul Azry Abdul Rahman 56'	Attendance: 120; Referee: Mohd Suhaimi Ismail

=== Week 3 ===
Friday 7 February	PDRM (Malaysia)	1–0	Sabah	Petaling Jaya Stadium, Petaling Jaya, Selangor
	Mohd Sabre Mat Abu 47'			Referee: Nazmi Nasarudin (Pulau Pinang)

Friday 7 February	DRB-Hicom (Kuala Lumpur)	0–1	Putrajaya SPA	Hang Jebat Stadium, Malacca
			Michaël Niçoise 34'	Referee: Suresh Jayaraman

Friday 7 February	Penang	1–0	(Malaysia) UiTM	Bandaraya Stadium, Georgetown, Penang
20:45 UTC+08:00	Lee Kil-Hoon 11'			Referee: Ramli Mat Dahan (Terengganu)

Friday 7 February	Negeri Sembilan	2–1	(Kuala Lumpur) Felda United	Tuanku Abdul Rahman Stadium, Seremban, Negeri Sembilan
20:45 UTC+08:00	Effa Owona 21'; S. Sivanesan 32'		Indra Putra Mahayuddin 68'	Referee: Mohd. Zohri Tajudin (Melaka)

Friday 7 February	Johor Darul Takzim II	1–0	Perlis	Pasir Gudang Corporation Stadium, Pasir Gudang, Johor
20:45 UTC+08:00	See Kok Luen 90+2'			Referee: Zulkifli Ahmad

=== Week 4 ===
Monday 10 February	DRB-Hicom (Kuala Lumpur)	3–2	Johor Darul Takzim II	Hang Jebat Stadium, Malacca
16.45 UTC+08:00	Khairul Anwar Shahrudin 30'; Khairul Naim Mahyuddin 55'; Mohd Fakhrullah Rosli 81'		Mohd Yusof Zainal Abidin 45+2'; Mohd Razif Abdul Rahim 63(og)'	Referee: Zulkarnain Zakaria (Kuala Lumpur)

Monday 10 February	Sabah	2–1	Negeri Sembilan	Likas Stadium, Kota Kinabalu, Sabah
20:15 UTC+08:00	Mohd Ezaidy Khadar 14'; Mohd Farid Ideris 21'		Effa Owona 11'	Referee: Teoh Hee Loon (Melaka)

Monday 10 February	PBAPP (Penang)	0–2	Putrajaya SPA	Bandaraya Stadium, Georgetown, Penang
20:45 UTC+08:00			Khairul Izwan Khalid 39', 61'	Referee: Mohd Amirul Izwan Yaakub (Perak)

Monday 10 February	Perlis	2–3	Penang	Darul Aman Stadium, Alor Star, Kedah
20:45 UTC+08:00	Dao Bakary 75'; Mohd Haziq 90+4'		Titi Buengo 1'; Lee Kil-Hoon 23', 52'	Referee: Mohd Jefri Zulkifli (Perak)

=== Week 5 ===
Friday 14 February	Putrajaya SPA	0–4	(Kuala Lumpur) Felda United	Hang Jebat Stadium, Malacca
16.45 UTC+08:00			Zah Rahan Krangar 5'; Edward Junior Wilson 61'; Mohd Aizul Ridzuan Razali 73'; Abdul Latiff Suhaimi 90'	Referee: Azham Musa

Friday 14 February	PDRM (Malaysia)	7–1	Perlis	Petaling Jaya Stadium, Petaling Jaya, Selangor
16.45 UTC+08:00	Ali Ashfaq 15', 51', 86'; Charles Souza Chad 49' (pen.), 64'; Bobby Gonzales 60'; Khairul Izuan Abdullah 62'		Dao Bakary 55'	Referee: Azman Jamaludin

Friday 14 February	UiTM (Malaysia)	0–1	Sabah	UiTM Stadium, Shah Alam, Selangor
16.45 UTC+08:00			Marwan Sayedeh 67'	Referee: Ahmad Zuhaidi Zulkifli

Friday 14 February	Johor Darul Takzim II	1–0	(Penang) PBAPP	Pasir Gudang Corporation Stadium, Pasir Gudang, Johor
20:45 UTC+08:00	See Kok Luen 67'			Referee: Kamal Ahmad (Kuala Lumpur)

Friday 14 February	Penang	2–1	(Kuala Lumpur) DRB-Hicom	Bandaraya Stadium, Georgetown, Penang
20:45 UTC+08:00	Hilton Moreira 56'; Lee Kil-Hoon 88'		Khairul Naim Mahyuddin 39'	Referee: Muhammad Suhaimi Ismail

Friday 14 February	Kedah	0–1	Negeri Sembilan	Darul Aman Stadium, Alor Star, Kedah
20:45 UTC+08:00			Effa Owona 58'	Referee: Mohd Jeffri zolkifli (Perak)

=== Week 6 ===
Friday 7 March	Perlis	2–1	(Malaysia) UiTM
16.45 UTC+08:00	Mohd Amri Fazal Mat Nor 22'; Gonzalo Garavano 43'		Obi Ikechukwu Charles 18'

Friday 7 March	DRB-Hicom (Kuala Lumpur)	1–2	(Malaysia) PDRM	Hang Jebat Stadium, Malacca
16.45 UTC+08:00	Stanyley Ogunboye Iyanu 72'		Charles Souza Chad 1'; Rafael Souza 89'

Friday 7 March	Sabah	3–2	Kedah	Likas Stadium, Kota Kinabalu, Sabah
20.15 UTC+08:00	Marwan Sayedeh 45+3', 81'; Srećko Mitrović 71'		Baddrol Bakhtiar 7'; Mohd Syazwan Zainon 45+1'

Friday 7 March	PBAPP (Penang)	1–2	Penang	Bandaraya Stadium, Georgetown, Penang
20.45 UTC+08:00	Muhd Badrulhisani Abdul Rahman 10'		Hilton Moreira 41'; Mohd Azizan Baba 90+4'

Friday 7 March	Felda United (Kuala Lumpur)	2–2	Johor Darul Takzim II	Petaling Jaya Stadium, Petaling Jaya, Selangor
20.45 UTC+08:00	Edward Junior Wilson 50'; Mohd Khairul Ismail 65'		Braulio Nobrega 13'; Mohd Azinee Taib 78'

Friday 7 March	Negeri Sembilan	0–0	Putrajaya SPA	Tuanku Abdul Rahman Stadium, Seremban, Negeri Sembilan
20.45 UTC+08:00

=== Week 7 ===
Tuesday 11 March	Kedah	1–1	(Penang) PBAPP	Darul Aman Stadium, Alor Star, Kedah
20.45 UTC+08:00	Mohd Faizal Abu Bakar 61'		Zainudin Abidin 15'

Friday 14 March	Putrajaya SPA	1–4	Kedah	Hang Jebat Stadium, Malacca
16.45 UTC+08:00	Fadzly Iskandar Adnan 50'		José Franco Gómez 16'; Mohd Syazwan Zainon 59'; Adam Aidil Iskandar Rosli 68'; Billy Mehmet 72'

Friday 14 March	PDRM (Malaysia)	4–0	(Penang) PBAPP	Petaling Jaya Stadium, Petaling Jaya, Selangor
16.45 UTC+08:00	Bobby Gonzales 23'; Munir Amran 50'; Mat Saiful Mohamad 54 (og)' Ali Ashfaq 74'

Friday 14 March	UiTM (Malaysia)	1–2	(Kuala Lumpur) DRB-Hicom	UiTM Stadium, Shah Alam, Selangor
16.45 UTC+08:00	Obi Ikechukwu Charles 33'		Stanley Ogunboye Iyanu Ezekiel 49'

Friday 14 March	Perlis	1–1	Sabah
16.45 UTC+08:00	Farouk Hashim 34'		Marwan Sayedeh 36'

Friday 14 March	Johor Darul Takzim II	2–0	Negeri Sembilan	Pasir Gudang Corporation Stadium, Pasir Gudang, Johor
20.45 UTC+08:00	Shahril Ishak 52'; Braulio Nobrega 72'

Friday 14 March	Penang	1–1	(Kuala Lumpur) Felda United	Bandaraya Stadium, Georgetown, Penang
20.45 UTC+08:00	Titi Buengo 4'		Indra Putra Mahayuddin 49'

=== Week 8 ===
Monday 17 March	DRB-Hicom (Kuala Lumpur)	1–1	Sabah	Hang Jebat Stadium, Malacca
16.45 UTC+08:00	Khairul Anwar Shahrudin 84'		Mohd Razif Abdul Rahim 51 (og)'

Friday 21 March	DRB-Hicom (Kuala Lumpur)	1–1	Perlis	Hang Jebat Stadium, Malacca
16.45 UTC+08:00	Farouk Hashim 10 (og)'		Wittawin Clowuttiwat 39'

Friday 21 March	Sabah	0–0	Putrajaya SPA	Likas Stadium, Kota Kinabalu, Sabah
20.15 UTC+08:00

Friday 21 March	PBAPP (Penang)	0–1	(Malaysia) UiTM	Bandaraya Stadium, Georgetown, Penang
20.45 UTC+08:00			Abdi Kassim Sadallah 2'

Friday 21 March	Felda United (Kuala Lumpur)	3–3	(Malaysia) PDRM	Petaling Jaya Stadium, Petaling Jaya, Selangor
20.45 UTC+08:00	Shahrulnizam Mustapha 45+2'; Indra Putra Mahayuddin 57'; Edward Junior Wilson 70'		Ali Ashfaq 11', 79'; Charles Souza Chad 30'

Friday 21 March	Negeri Sembilan	1–3	Penang	Tuanku Abdul Rahman Stadium, Seremban, Negeri Sembilan
20.45 UTC+08:00	Kim Jin-Ryong 9'		Mohd Baser Napae 13', 25'; Hilton Moreira 32'

Friday 21 March	Kedah	1–0	Johor Darul Takzim II	Darul Aman Stadium, Alor Star, Kedah
20.45 UTC+08:00	Billy Mehmet 47'

=== Week 9 ===
Monday 24 March	PDRM (Malaysia)	2–2	Negeri Sembilan	Petaling Jaya Stadium, Petaling Jaya, Selangor
16.45 UTC+08:00	Charles Souza Chad 47 (Pen)'; Rafael Souza 82'		Effa Owona 1'; S. Sivanesan 72'

Monday 24 March	UiTM (Malaysia)	2–4	(Kuala Lumpur) Felda United	UiTM Stadium, Shah Alam, Selangor
16.45 UTC+08:00	Obi Ikechukwu Charles 20', 72'		Edward Wilson 3'; Indra Putra Mahayuddin 26'; Mohd Haris Safwan 38'; Zah Rahan Krangar 90+1'

Monday 24 March	Perlis	2–1	(Penang) PBAPP
16.45 UTC+08:00	Dao Bakary 10'; Rosli Muda 14'		Muhd Badrulhisani Abdul Rahman 2'

Monday 24 March	Johor Darul Takzim II	2–0	Putrajaya SPA	Pasir Gudang Corporation Stadium, Pasir Gudang, Johor
20.45 UTC+08:00	Braulio Nobrega 50'; Nicolás Delmonte 54'

Monday 24 March	Penang	1–0	Kedah	Bandaraya Stadium, Georgetown, Penang
20.45 UTC+08:00	Lee Kwang-Hyun 57'

=== Week 10 ===
Friday 28 March	Putrajaya SPA	0–0	Penang	Hang Jebat Stadium, Malacca
16.45 UTC+08:00

Friday 28 March	Sabah	1–1	Johor Darul Takzim II	Likas Stadium, Kota Kinabalu, Sabah
20.15 UTC+08:00	Marwan Sayedeh 27 (pen)'		Braulio Nobrega 31 (pen)'

Friday 28 March	PBAPP (Penang)	0–3	(Kuala Lumpur) DRB Hicom	Bandaraya Stadium, Georgetown, Penang
20.45 UTC+08:00			Stanley Ogunboye Iyanu Ezekiel 15'; Mohd Fakhrullah Rosli 37'; Muhammad Azreen Zulkafali 55'

Friday 28 March	Felda United (Kuala Lumpur)	5–1	Perlis	Majlis Perbandaran Selayang Stadium, Selayang, Selangor
20.45 UTC+08:00	Edward Junior Wilson; K. Soley; Ndumba Makeche		Dao Bakary 16'

Friday 28 March	Negeri Sembilan	1–0	(Malaysia) UiTM	Tuanku Abdul Rahman Stadium, Seremban, Negeri Sembilan
20.45 UTC+08:00	Kim Jin-Ryong 26'

Friday 28 March	Kedah	1–3	(Malaysia) PDRM	Darul Aman Stadium, Alor Star, Kedah
20.45 UTC+08:00	Baddrol Bakhtiar 79'		Ali Ashfaq 18', 44', 72'

=== Week 11 ===
Friday 4 April	PDRM (Malaysia)	7–1	Putrajaya SPA	MPJK Stadium, Selangor
16.45 UTC+08:00	Ali Ashfaq (2); Bobby Gonzales; Charles Souza Chad (2} Mohd Fazilidin Khalid; Mohd Hafiszuan Salehuddin (og)		A. Puvanarajah

Friday 4 April	UiTM (Malaysia)	1–3	Kedah	UiTM Stadium, Shah Alam, Selangor
16.45 UTC+08:00	Muhamad Razren Mohd Jesni 22'		Mohd Khyril Muhymeen Zambri 31', 48'; Shafizan Hashim 74'

Friday 4 April	Sabah	3–1	(Penang) PBAPP	Likas Stadium, Kota Kinabalu, Sabah
20.15 UTC+08:00	Mohd Redzuan Nawi; Maxsius Musa; Marwan Sayedeh		Mohd Khalis Ibrahim

Friday 4 April	Penang	4–1	Johor Darul Takzim II	Bandaraya Stadium, Georgetown, Penang
20.45 UTC+08:00	Titi Buengo 3', 80'; Lee Kil-Hoon 55'; Shazuan Ashraf Mathews 76'		Shahril Ishak 44'

Friday 4 April	Perlis	0–1	Negeri Sembilan	Darul Aman Stadium, Alor Star, Kedah
20.45 UTC+08:00			Kim Jin-Ryong

Friday 4 April	DRB-Hicom (Malaysia)	1–3	(Kuala Lumpur) Felda United	Hang Jebat Stadium, Malacca
20.45 UTC+08:00	Ashadi Mohd Yusoff 38'		Zah Rahan Krangar 39', 90'; Indra Putra Mahayuddin 61'

=== Week 12 ===
Monday 7 April	UiTM (Malaysia)	0–2	(Malaysia) PDRM	UiTM Stadium, Shah Alam, Selangor
16.45 UTC+08:00			Charles Souza Chad 68'; Mohamadou Sumareh 89'

Monday 7 April	Felda United (Kuala Lumpur)	1–0	Kedah	Majlis Perbandaran Selayang Stadium, Selayang, Selangor
20.45 UTC+08:00	Edward Junior Wilson 63'

Friday 11 April	Putrajaya SPA	0–3	(Malaysia) PDRM	Hang Jebat Stadium, Malacca
16.45 UTC+08:00			Charles Souza Chad 6', 18'; Munir Amran 15'

Friday 11 April	Felda United (Kuala Lumpur)	3–2	(Malaysia) DRB-Hicom	Majlis Perbandaran Selayang Stadium, Selayang, Selangor
20.45 UTC+08:00	Ahmad Syamim Yahya 17'; Edward Junior Wilson 21', 57'		Ogunboye Iyanu Ezekiel 33'; Mohammad Naeem Rahimi 82'

Friday 11 April	Johor Darul Takzim II	3–2	Penang	Pasir Gudang Corporation Stadium, Pasir Gudang, Johor
20.45 UTC+08:00	Braulio Nobrega 45', 90 (pen)' Shahril Ishak 52'		Titi Buengo 54'; Lee Kil-Hoon 65'

Friday 11 April	Kedah	1–1	(Malaysia) UiTM	Darul Aman Stadium, Alor Star, Kedah
20.45 UTC+08:00	Billy Mehmet 88'		Aiman Shazwan Abdullah 90+3'

Friday 11 April	Negeri Sembilan	2–0	Perlis	Tuanku Abdul Rahman Stadium, Seremban, Negeri Sembilan
20.45 UTC+08:00	Kim Jin-Ryong 15'; Jozef Kaplan 78'

Friday 11 April	PBAPP (Penang)	1–0	Sabah	Bandaraya Stadium, Georgetown, Penang
20.45 UTC+08:00	Mohd Faiz Mohd Nasir 18'

=== Week 13 ===
Monday 14 April	PDRM (Malaysia)	1–0	Johor Darul Takzim II	Petaling Jaya Stadium, Petaling Jaya, Selangor
16.45 UTC+08:00	Ahmad Ezrie Shafizie Sazali 83'

Monday 14 April	UiTM (Malaysia)	2–1	Putrajaya SPA	UiTM Stadium, Shah Alam, Selangor
16.45 UTC+08:00	Engku Shahrial; Bang Seung-Hwan		Khairul Izwan Khalid

Monday 14 April	DRB-Hicom (Malaysia)	1–3	Negeri Sembilan	Hang Jebat Stadium, Malacca
16.45 UTC+08:00	Ashadi Mohd Yusoff 46'		Kim Jin-Ryong 34'; S. Sivanesan 38'; Jozef Kaplan 56'

Monday 14 April	Sabah	1–3	Penang	Likas Stadium, Kota Kinabalu, Sabah
20.15 UTC+08:00	Andrezinho 37'		Muhamad Zamri Chin 52'; Titi Buengo 65'; Lee Kil-Hoon 71'

Monday 14 April	PBAPP (Penang)	1–2	(Kuala Lumpur) Felda United	Bandaraya Stadium, Georgetown, Penang
20.45 UTC+08:00	Mohd Faiz Mohd Nasir 73'		Edward Junior Wilson 16'; Ndumba Makeche 58'

Monday 14 April	Perlis	1–6	Kedah	Darul Aman Stadium, Alor Star, Kedah
20.45 UTC+08:00	Dao Bakary 80 (pen)'		Billy Mehmet 10', 15', 50'; Mohd Faizal Abu Bakar 33'; Adam Griffiths 45+1'; Baddrol Bakhtiar 46'

=== Week 14 ===
Friday 18 April	Felda United (Kuala Lumpur)	2–1	Sabah	Majlis Perbandaran Selayang Stadium, Selayang, Selangor
16.45 UTC+08:00	Indra Putra Mahayuddin 16'; Ndumba Makeche 66'		Andrezinho 50'

Friday 18 April	Putrajaya SPA	1–1	Perlis	Hang Jebat Stadium, Malacca
16.45 UTC+08:00	Alen Guć 83'		Mohd Farizal Rozali 40'

Friday 18 April	Penang	1–2	(Malaysia) PDRM	Bandaraya Stadium, Georgetown, Penang
20.45 UTC+08:00	Lee Kil-Hoon 63'		Charles Souza Chad 53'; Ali Ashfaq 90'

Friday 18 April	Negeri Sembilan	2–0	(Penang) PBAPP	Tuanku Abdul Rahman Stadium, Seremban, Negeri Sembilan
20.45 UTC+08:00	Ivan Babic 45'; Kim Jin-Ryong 51'

Friday 18 April	Kedah	0–2	(Malaysia) DRB-Hicom	Darul Aman Stadium, Alor Star, Kedah
20.45 UTC+08:00			Khairul Naim Mahyuddin 23'; Mohd Fakhrullah Rosli 65'

Saturday 19 April	Johor Darul Takzim II	2–2	(Malaysia) UiTM	Pasir Gudang Corporation Stadium, Pasir Gudang, Johor
20.45 UTC+08:00	Muhammad Akram Mahinan 16'; Mohd Izuan Jarudin 75'		Abdi Kassim Sadallah 48', 84'

=== Week 15 ===
Friday 9 May	Perlis	0–2	Johor Darul Takzim II
			Mohd Azinee Taib 34', 40'

Friday 9 May	UiTM (Malaysia)	0–0	Penang	UiTM Stadium, Shah Alam, Selangor
16.45 UTC+08:00

Friday 9 May	Felda United (Kuala Lumpur)	1–0	Negeri Sembilan	Majlis Perbandaran Selayang Stadium, Selayang, Selangor
16.45 UTC+08:00	Indra Putra Mahayuddin 82'

Friday 9 May	Sabah	2–2	(Malaysia) PDRM	Likas Stadium, Kota Kinabalu, Sabah
20.15 UTC+08:00	Zainizam Marjan 28'; Marwan Sayedeh 54'		Bobby Gonzales 72'; Rafael Souza 89'

Friday 9 May	PBAPP (Penang)	2–7	Kedah	Bandaraya Stadium, Georgetown, Penang
20.45 UTC+08:00	Edrisar Kaye 76 (pen)' Muhd Zamri 80'		Khairul Helmi Johari 3'; Namgung Woong 12', 44'; Mohd Syamim Alif Mohd Sobri 39', 71'; Billy Mehmet 63', 77'

Friday 9 May	Putrajaya SPA	1–3	(Malaysia) DRB-Hicom	Hang Jebat Stadium, Malacca
16.45 UTC+08:00	Guy Bwele 80'		Ogunboye Iyanu Ezekiel 24', 38', 46'

=== Week 16 ===
Friday 16 May	Putrajaya SPA	2–1	(Penang) PBAPP	Hang Jebat Stadium, Malacca
16.45 UTC+08:00	Alen Guć 41'; Mohd Norhafizzuan 50'		Edrisar Kaye 18 (pen)'

Friday 16 May	PDRM (Malaysia)	1–1	(Malaysia) UiTM	Petaling Jaya Stadium, Petaling Jaya, Selangor
16.45 UTC+08:00	Charles Souza Chad 15'		Abdi Kassim Sadallah 89'

Friday 16 May	Negeri Sembilan	0–1	Sabah	Tuanku Abdul Rahman Stadium, Seremban, Negeri Sembilan
20.45 UTC+08:00			Marwan Sayedeh 64'

Friday 16 May	Kedah	1–0	(Kuala Lumpur) Felda United	Darul Aman Stadium, Alor Star, Kedah
20.45 UTC+08:00	Muhd Syafiq Ahmad 90'

Friday 16 May	Penang	2–1	Perlis	Bandaraya Stadium, Georgetown, Penang
20.45 UTC+08:00	Lee Kil-Hoon 66', 80'		Mourad Faris 3'

Saturday 17 May	Johor Darul Takzim II	1–1	(Malaysia) DRB-Hicom	Pasir Gudang Corporation Stadium, Pasir Gudang, Johor
20.45 UTC+08:00	Braulio Nobrega 28'		Ogunboye Iyanu Ezekiel 39'

=== Week 17 ===
Friday 23 May	DRB-Hicom (Malaysia)	1–3	Penang	Hang Jebat Stadium, Malacca
16.45 UTC+08:00	Mohd Fakhrullah Rosli 58'		Muhd Rafiuddin Rodin 21', 46'; Luiz Ricardo Lino Dos Santos 75'

Friday 23 May	Sabah	1–3	(Malaysia) UiTM	Likas Stadium, Kota Kinabalu, Sabah
20.15 UTC+08:00	Maxsius Musa 90'		Ahmad Shahir Ismail 38'; Obi Ikechukwu Charles 45', 67'

Friday 23 May	Felda United (Kuala Lumpur)	5–3	Putrajaya SPA	Majlis Perbandaran Selayang Stadium, Selayang, Selangor
16.45 UTC+08:00	Mohd Raimi Mohd Nor 11', 50'; Edward Junior Wilson 15', 37'; Zah Rahan Krangar 90 (pen)'		Alen Guć 52'; Mohd Hanifuddin Abdul Rahman 58'; A. Puvanarajah 79'

Friday 23 May	Negeri Sembilan	1–2	Kedah	Tuanku Abdul Rahman Stadium, Seremban, Negeri Sembilan
20.45 UTC+08:00	Jean Alexandre 85'		Billy Mehmet 3'; Namgung Woong 31'

Friday 23 May	PBAPP (Penang)	0–1	Johor Darul Takzim II	Bandaraya Stadium, Georgetown, Penang
20.45 UTC+08:00			Mohd Azinee Taib 29'

Monday 2 June	Perlis	2–3	(Malaysia) PDRM	Darul Aman Stadium, Alor Star, Kedah
20.45 UTC+08:00	Dao Bakary 68'; Hadi Syahmi Hamzah 83'		Mohd Khairi Zainuddin 44 (og)' Charles Souza Chad 49', 66'

=== Week 18 ===
Monday 9 June	Putrajaya SPA	3–3	Negeri Sembilan	Hang Jebat Stadium, Malacca
16.45 UTC+08:00	Guy Bwele 17', 61'; Eddy Viator 90 (pen)'		S. Sivanesan 16'; Ivan Babić 68'; Kim Jin-Ryong 81 (pen)'

Monday 9 June	PDRM (Malaysia)	2–1	(Malaysia) DRB-Hicom	Petaling Jaya Stadium, Petaling Jaya, Selangor
16.45 UTC+08:00	Mohd Afif Amiruddin 39'; Mohamadou Sumareh 41'		Ogunboye Iyanu Ezekiel 29'

Monday 9 June	Kedah	2–0	Sabah	Darul Aman Stadium, Alor Star, Kedah
20.45 UTC+08:00	Mohd Faizal Abu Bakar 70'; Zuraindey Jumai 90'

Monday 9 June	Penang	3–1	(Penang) PBAPP	Bandaraya Stadium, Georgetown, Penang
20.45 UTC+08:00	Luiz Ricardo Lino Dos Santos 43'; Mohd Hazrul Shah Abdul Hakim 60 (og)' Shazuan Ashraf Mathews 63'		Edrisar Kaye 70'

Tuesday 10 June	UiTM (Malaysia)	2–0	Perlis	UiTM Stadium, Shah Alam, Selangor
16.45 UTC+08:00	Obi Ikechukwu Charles 45'; Aiman Syazwan Abdullah 67'

Tuesday 10 June	Johor Darul Takzim II	1–1	(Kuala Lumpur) Felda United	Pasir Gudang Corporation Stadium, Pasir Gudang, Johor
20.45 UTC+08:00	Nicolas Delmonte 68'		Edward Junior Wilson 87 (pen)'

=== Week 19 ===
Friday 13 June	DRB-Hicom (Malaysia)	4–0	(Malaysia) UiTM	Hang Jebat Stadium, Malacca
16.45 UTC+08:00	Ogunboye Iyanu Ezekiel 10', 63', 68'; Mohd Fakhrullah Rosli 76'

Friday 13 June	Sabah	0–0	Perlis	Likas Stadium, Kota Kinabalu, Sabah
20.15 UTC+08:00

Friday 13 June	Felda United (Kuala Lumpur)	4–1	Penang	Majlis Perbandaran Selayang Stadium, Selayang, Selangor
20.45 UTC+08:00	Ahmad Syamim Yahya 12'; Mohd Raimi Mohd Nor 28'; Zah Rahan Krangar 50'; Abdul Latiff Suhaimi 87'		Luiz Ricardo Lino Dos Santos 57'

Friday 13 June	PBAPP (Penang)	1–4	(Malaysia) PDRM	Bandaraya Stadium, Georgetown, Penang
20.45 UTC+08:00	Boris Kochkin 45'		Ali Ashfaq 3', 53'; Bobby Gonzales 75'; Charles Souza Chad 86'

Friday 13 June	Negeri Sembilan	2–2	Johor Darul Takzim II	Tuanku Abdul Rahman Stadium, Seremban, Negeri Sembilan
20.45 UTC+08:00	Ivan Babic 58'; Mohd Nizam Abu Bakar 67'		Izuan Jarudin 26'; Mohd Azinee Taib 60'

Friday 13 June	Kedah	1–1	Putrajaya SPA	Darul Aman Stadium, Alor Star, Kedah
20.45 UTC+08:00	Namgung Woong 69'		Mohd Asyidi Dil Ashar Yusof 86'

=== Week 20 ===
Monday 16 June	Putrajaya SPA	2–0	Sabah	Hang Jebat Stadium, Malacca
16.45 UTC+08:00	Khairul Izwan Khalid 28'; Eddy Viator 39 (pen)'

Monday 16 June	PDRM (Malaysia)	0–1	(Kuala Lumpur) Felda United	Petaling Jaya Stadium, Petaling Jaya, Selangor
16.45 UTC+08:00			Zah Rahan Krangar 42'

Monday 16 June	UiTM (Malaysia)	2–2	(Penang) PBAPP	UiTM Stadium, Shah Alam, Selangor
16.45 UTC+08:00	Obi Ikechukwu Charles 45'; Mohd Razren Jesni 53'		Edrisar Kaye 70', 82'

Monday 16 June	Johor Darul Takzim II	1–1	Kedah	Pasir Gudang Corporation Stadium, Pasir Gudang, Johor
20.45 UTC+08:00	Mohd Zaquan Adha Abdul Radzak 55'		Muhammad Farhan Roslan 5'

Monday 16 June	Penang	2–1	Negeri Sembilan	Bandaraya Stadium, Georgetown, Penang
20.45 UTC+08:00	Lee Kil-Hoon 20', 31'		Kim Jin-Ryong 29'

Monday 16 June	Perlis	2–2	(Malaysia) DRB-Hicom	Darul Aman Stadium, Alor Star, Kedah
20.45 UTC+08:00	Dao Bakary 4', 24'		Ogunboye Iyanu Ezekiel 18'; Mohd Arif Baseri 29'

=== Week 21 ===
Friday 20 June	Putrajaya SPA	1–2	Johor Darul Takzim II	Hang Jebat Stadium, Malacca
16.45 UTC+08:00	Khairol Azry Abdul Rahman 45'		Shahril Ishak 74'; Nicolas Delmonte 90'

Friday 20 June	Sabah	1–0	(Malaysia) DRB-Hicom	Likas Stadium, Kota Kinabalu, Sabah
20.15 UTC+08:00	Predrag Pocuca 23'

Friday 20 June	Felda United (Kuala Lumpur)	8–0	(Malaysia) UiTM	Majlis Perbandaran Selayang Stadium, Selayang, Selangor
20.45 UTC+08:00	Mohd Raimi Md Nor 20'; Edward Junior Wilson 44', 47'; Indra Putra Mahayuddin 62', 88', 90'; Ndumba Makeche 83'; Mohd Syahid Zaidon 84'

Friday 20 June	Negeri Sembilan	0–4	(Malaysia) PDRM	Tuanku Abdul Rahman Stadium, Seremban, Negeri Sembilan
20.45 UTC+08:00			Bobby Gonzales 7'; Mohd Fauzi Abdul Majid 40'; Ali Ashfaq 49'; Mohd Shahril Izwan Abdullah 71'

Friday 20 June	Kedah	1–1	Penang	Darul Aman Stadium, Alor Star, Kedah
20.45 UTC+08:00	Billy Mehmet 49'		Lee Kil-Hoon 77'

Friday 20 June	PBAPP (Penang)	1–1	Perlis	Bandaraya Stadium, Georgetown, Penang
20.45 UTC+08:00	Muhd Badrulhisani Abdul Rahman 73'		Norismaidham Ismail 53'

=== Week 22 ===
Tuesday 24 June	DRB-Hicom (Malaysia)	1–1	(Penang) PBAPP	Hang Jebat Stadium, Malacca
16.45 UTC+08:00

Tuesday 24 June	PDRM (Malaysia)	2–3	Kedah	Petaling Jaya Stadium, Petaling Jaya, Selangor
16.45 UTC+08:00

Tuesday 24 June	UiTM (Malaysia)	1–1	Negeri Sembilan	UiTM Stadium, Shah Alam, Selangor
16.45 UTC+08:00

Tuesday 24 June	Johor Darul Takzim II	1–0	Sabah	Pasir Gudang Corporation Stadium, Pasir Gudang, Johor
20.45 UTC+08:00

Tuesday 24 June	Perlis	2–3	(Kuala Lumpur) Felda United	Darul Aman Stadium, Alor Star, Kedah
20.45 UTC+08:00

Tuesday 24 June	Penang	2–2	Putrajaya SPA	Pasir Gudang Corporation Stadium, Pasir Gudang, Johor
20.45 UTC+08:00

== Season statistics ==
=== Top scorers ===
Rank	Player	Club	Goals
1	(Liberia) Edward Junior Wilson	Felda United	19
2	(Maldives) Ali Ashfaq	PDRM	18
3	(Brazil) Charles Souza Chad	PDRM	16
4	(Nigeria) Ogunboye Iyanu Ezekiel	DRB-Hicom	15
4	(Republic of Ireland) Billy Mehmet	Kedah	15
4	(South Korea) Lee Kil-Hoon	Penang	15
7	(Malaysia) Indra Putra Mahayuddin	Felda United	10
7	(Nigeria) Obi Ikechukwu Charles	UiTM	10
9	(Liberia) Zah Rahan Krangar	Felda United	9
10	(Spain) Braulio Nobrega	Johor Darul Takzim II	8
10	(South Korea) Kim Jin-Ryong	Negeri Sembilan	8
10	(Malaysia) Bobby Gonzales	PDRM	8
10	(Ivory Coast) Dao Bakary	Perlis	8
10	(Syria) Marwan Sayedeh	Sabah	8

=== Hat-tricks ===
Player	For	Against	Result	Date
(Maldives) Ali Ashfaq	PDRM	Perlis	7–1	14 February 2014
(Liberia) Edward Junior Wilson	Felda United	Perlis	5–1	28 March 2014
(Maldives) Ali Ashfaq	PDRM	Kedah	1–3	28 March 2014
(Republic of Ireland) Billy Mehmet	Kedah	Perlis	1–6	14 April 2014
(Malaysia) Indra Putra Mahayuddin	Felda United	UiTM	8–0	20 June 2014

=== Scoring ===
- First goal of the season: Muhamad Daud Zo for PBAPP against Felda United FC (24 January 2014)
- Fastest goal of the season: 1 Minute – Titi Buengo for Penang against Perlis (10 February 2014)
- Largest winning margin: 8 goals
  - Felda United 8–0 UiTM (20 June 2014)
- Highest scoring game: 9 goals
  - PBAPP 2–7 Kedah (9 May 2014)
- Most goals scored in a match by a single team: 8 goals
  - Felda United 8–0 UiTM (20 June 2014)
- Most goals scored in a match by a losing team: 2 goals
  - DRB-Hicom 3–2 Johor Darul Ta'zim II (10 February 2014)
  - Perlis 2–3 Penang (10 February 2014)
  - Sabah 3–2 Kedah (7 March 2014)
  - UiTM 2–4 Felda United F.C. (24 March 2014)
  - Felda United 3–2 DRB-Hicom (11 April 2014)
  - Johor Darul Ta'zim II 3–2 Penang (11 April 2014)
  - PBAPP 2–7 Kedah (9 May 2014)

== Transfers ==
For transfers see: List of Malaysian football transfer 2014

== See also ==
- 2014 Liga Super
- 2014 Liga FAM
- 2014 Piala Malaysia
- 2014 Piala FA
