= 2015 Malaysia Premier League =

Liga Premier
- Season: 2015
- Champions: (Kedah) Kedah; 4th Second Division title
- Promoted: Kedah; Penang
- Relegated: SPA
- Matches: 126
- Goals: 399 (3.17 per match)
- Top goalscorer: Forkey Doe (17 goals)
- Biggest home win: T-Team 7–0 SPA (18 August 2015)
- Biggest away win: SPA 1–5 Johor Darul Ta'zim II (13 February 2015); DRB-Hicom 1–5 Kedah (22 August 2015)
- Highest scoring: NS Matrix 3–5 T-Team (13 March 2015)
- Longest winning run: 3 games Johor Darul Ta'zim II
- Highest attendance: 21,900; Kedah 0–0 T-Team (3 May 2015)
- Lowest attendance: 100; SPA 0–4 DRB-Hicom (13 March 2015)
- Total attendance: 133,345
- Average attendance: 4,445

The 2015 Liga Premier (English: 2015 Premier League) was the 12th season of the Liga Premier, the second-tier professional football league in Malaysia.

The season was held from January and concluded in August 2015.

The Liga Premier champions for 2015 season was Kedah. The champions and runners-up were both promoted to 2016 Liga Super.

== Team changes ==
=== To Liga Super ===
Promoted from 2014 Liga Premier

- PDRM
- Felda United

Relegated from 2014 Liga Super

- T-Team
- PKNS

=== From Liga FAM ===
Promoted to 2015 Liga Premier

- Kuantan
- Kuala Lumpur

Relegated to 2015 Liga FAM

- Perlis
- PBAPP

=== Rule changes ===
- A total of 4 foreign players can be registered by Liga Premier teams, including at least one player from AFC countries. A maximum of 3 foreign players can be fielded at one time in a match. The announcement was made by FAM during the exco meeting in November 2013, following a decision to upgrade the foreign players quota from 2 in 2013 to 3 in the April 2013 meeting. The Liga Premier also introduced the "home grown players" rule, which aims to encourage the development of young footballers at Liga Premier clubs. The new rule required clubs to name at least five U-21 players in their squad.

=== Name changes ===
- Negeri Sembilan were renamed to NS Matrix for sponsorship reason.

== Teams ==
A total of 12 teams are contesting the league, including 8 sides from the 2014 season, two promoted from the 2014 Malaysia FAM League and two relegated from 2014 Liga Super.

On 27 May 2014, Kuala Lumpur earned promotion from the 2014 Malaysia FAM League. They returned to the second division after being absent for a year. This was followed by Kuantan. The two teams replace Perlis and PBAPP who were all relegated to the 2015 Liga FAM.

T-Team and PKNS were relegated from 2014 Liga Super. They are replacing PDRM and Felda United who get promotion to 2015 Liga Super.

== Team summaries ==
=== Team locations ===
Locations of the 2015 Liga Premier teams

=== Stadium ===
| Team | Team Based | Stadium Location | Stadium | Stadium Capacity |
|---|---|---|---|---|
| DRB-Hicom | Kuala Lumpur | Tanjung Malim | Proton City Stadium | 5,000 |
| Kuala Lumpur | Kuala Lumpur | Kuala Lumpur | Merdeka Stadium | 25,000 |
| Johor Darul Ta'zim II | Johor Bahru | Pasir Gudang | Pasir Gudang Corporation Stadium | 15,000 |
| Kedah | Alor Star | Alor Star | Darul Aman Stadium | 32,387 |
| NS Matrix | Seremban | Paroi | Tuanku Abdul Rahman Stadium | 40,000 |
| Kuantan | Kuantan | Kuantan | Darul Makmur Stadium | 40,000 |
| PKNS | Kelana Jaya | Petaling Jaya | MBPJ Stadium | 25,000 |
| Penang | George Town | George Town | Bandaraya Stadium | 20,000 |
| T-Team | Kuala Terengganu | Kuala Terengganu | Sultan Ismail Nasiruddin Shah Stadium | 15,000 |
| SPA | Kuala Lumpur | Petaling Jaya | MBPJ Stadium | 25,000 |
| Sabah | Kota Kinabalu | Kota Kinabalu | Likas Stadium | 35,000 |
| UiTM | Shah Alam | Shah Alam | UiTM Stadium | 10,000 |

=== Personnel and sponsoring ===
| Team | Head coach | Captain | Kit manufacturer | Shirt sponsor |
|---|---|---|---|---|
| DRB-Hicom | (Malaysia) Chong Yee Fatt | (Malaysia) Abdullah Yusoff | Mizuno | DRB-HICOM |
| Kuantan | (Malaysia) Zulhamizan Zakaria | (Malaysia) Khairul Azman Awang Long | Kappa | Nilaitek |
| Johor Darul Ta'zim II | (Croatia) Nenad Baćina | (Singapore) Shahril Ishak | Nike | Country Garden |
| Kedah | (Malaysia) Tan Cheng Hoe | (Malaysia) Baddrol Bakhtiar | Warrix Sports | Kedah |
| NS Matrix | (Malaysia) K. Devan | (Malaysia) Rezal Zambery Yahya | Kappa | Matrix Concepts |
| Kuala Lumpur | (Malaysia) Tang Siew Seng | (Malaysia) Syazwan Rani | Warrix Sports | Kuala Lumpur City Hall |
| Penang | (Brazil) Jacksen F. Tiago | (Malaysia) Redzuan Nawi | Umbro | Penang Water Supply Corporation |
| PKNS | (Malaysia) E. Elavarasan | (Malaysia) Shahrul Azhar Ture | Kappa | PKNS |
| SPA | (Australia) Ken Worden | (South Korea) Kwon Jun | Line 7 | SPA |
| Sabah | (England) Mike Mulvey | (Senegal) El Hadji Diouf | Adidas | Globaltec |
| T-Team | (Croatia) Tomislav Steinbrückner | (Malaysia) Marzuki Yusof | Eutag | EPIC |
| UiTM | (Malaysia) Azuan Zain | (Malaysia) Aiman Syazwan Abdullah | Umbro | KPM |

=== Foreign players ===
The number of foreign players is restricted to four per Malaysian League team. A team can use four foreign players on the field in each game, including at least one player from the AFC country.

Note: Flags indicate national team as has been registered to the official Liga Premier. Players may hold more than one FIFA and non-FIFA nationality.

| Club | Visa 1 | Visa 2 | Visa 3 | Visa 4 (Asian) | Former Player |
|---|---|---|---|---|---|
| DRB-Hicom | (Spain) Godwin Antwi | (Japan) Terukazu Tanaka | (Croatia) Ivan Babic | (Japan) Hayato Hashimoto | |
| Johor Darul Ta'zim II | (Singapore) Baihakki Khaizan | (Argentina) Nicolás Delmonte | (Argentina) Leandro Velázquez | (Singapore) Shahril Ishak | |
| Kedah | (Brazil) Sandro Mendonça | (Albania) Liridon Krasniqi | (Nigeria) Chidi Edeh | (South Korea) Bang Seung-Hwan | (Kenya) Lawrence Olum (Liberia) Keith Nah |
| Kuala Lumpur | (South Korea) Lee Sung-hyun | (Mali) Modibo Konte | (South Korea) Lee Jin-seuk | (South Korea) Choi Hyun-yeon | (Cameroon) Martin Ekoule (Cameroon) Kallé Soné (Nigeria) Ogunboye Iyanu |
| Kuantan | (Morocco) Tarik El Janaby | (Montenegro) Milan Purovic | (Haiti) Fabrice Noel | (South Korea) Lee Kwang-Hyun | (South Korea) Im Kyung-hyun |
| NS Matrix | (Haiti) Jean Alexandre | (Argentina) Bruno Martelotto | (Liberia) Francis Doe | (South Korea) Kim Jin-yong | |
| Penang | (Brazil) Reinaldo Lobo | (Brazil) Hilton Moreira | (Brazil) Beto Gonçalves | (South Korea) Lee Kil-Hoon | |
| PKNS | (Argentina) Gonzalo Soto | (Argentina) Gabriel Guerra | (Liberia) Patrick Wleh | (Timor-Leste) Pedro Henrique | (Japan) Keisuke Ogawa |
| SPA | (South Korea) Kwon Jun | (Russia) Rod Dyachenko | (Italy) Simone Quintieri | (Australia) Cameron Edwards | (Cameroon) Guy Bwele (Nigeria) Michael Ijezie (Singapore) Precious Emuejeraye |
| Sabah | (Senegal) Abdoulaye Faye | (Libya) Éamon Zayed | (Senegal) El Hadji Diouf | (Australia) Joel Chianese | (Singapore) Fazrul Nawaz |
| T–Team | (Croatia) Josip Milardovic | (Uzbekistan) Sadriddin Abdullaev | (Croatia) Tomislav Bušić | (Uzbekistan) Farhod Tadjiyev | (Nigeria) David Oniya |
| UiTM | (Cameroon) Mbom Mbom Julien | (Tanzania) Abdi Kassim | (Ivory Coast) Dao Bakary | | |

== League table ==
| Pos | Team | Pld | W | D | L | GF | GA | GD | Pts | Promotion, qualification or relegation |
|---|---|---|---|---|---|---|---|---|---|---|
| 1 | Kedah (C, P) | 22 | 14 | 6 | 2 | 47 | 26 | +21 | 48 | Promotion to Super League |
| 2 | Penang (P) | 22 | 13 | 6 | 3 | 39 | 18 | +21 | 45 | Promotion to Super League |
| 3 | (Terengganu) T-Team (O, P) | 22 | 12 | 6 | 4 | 50 | 27 | +23 | 42 | Qualification to Promotion play-off |
| 4 | (Selangor) PKNS | 22 | 11 | 8 | 3 | 41 | 22 | +19 | 41 | |
| 5 | Johor Darul Ta'zim II | 22 | 10 | 4 | 8 | 37 | 32 | +5 | 34 | |
| 6 | (Negeri Sembilan) NS Matrix | 22 | 8 | 8 | 6 | 33 | 28 | +5 | 32 | |
| 7 | Sabah | 22 | 8 | 3 | 11 | 37 | 42 | −5 | 27 | |
| 8 | (Selangor) UiTM | 22 | 7 | 4 | 11 | 28 | 42 | −14 | 25 | |
| 9 | (Pahang) Kuantan | 22 | 6 | 3 | 13 | 30 | 46 | −16 | 21 | |
| 10 | (Kuala Lumpur) DRB-Hicom | 22 | 4 | 8 | 10 | 25 | 32 | −7 | 20 | |
| 11 | Kuala Lumpur | 22 | 5 | 3 | 14 | 17 | 33 | −16 | 18 | |
| 12 | Putrajaya SPA (R) | 22 | 2 | 5 | 15 | 15 | 50 | −35 | 11 | Relegation to FAM League |

Source: FAM Official Site, Astro Arena
Rules for classification: 1) Points; 2) Goal difference; 3) Number of goals scored
(C) Champions; (O) Play-off winners; (P) Promoted; (R) Relegated

== Fixtures and results ==
Fixtures and results of the Liga Premier 2015 season.

=== Week 1 ===
| Friday 6 February | PKNS | 2–0 | T-Team | MBPJ Stadium, Petaling Jaya |
| 16:45 UTC+08:00 | Soto 60'; Munir 65' | | | Attendance: 200; Referee: Ahmad Zuhaidi Dzulkifli |

| Friday 6 February | UiTM | 1–2 | Johor Darul Ta'zim II | UiTM Stadium, Shah Alam |
| 16:45 UTC+08:00 | Bakary 56' | | Shahril 9'; Velázquez 82' | Attendance: 1,300; Referee: Zulkifli Ahmad |

| Friday 6 February | DRB-Hicom | 1–3 | NS Matrix | Hang Jebat Stadium, Melaka |
| 16:45 UTC+08:00 | Aiman 17' | | Alexandre 18'; Doe 51'; Puaneswaran 78' | Attendance: 350; Referee: Mohd Zamzaidi Katimin |

| Friday 6 February | Kuala Lumpur | 0–2 | Sabah | Merdeka Stadium, Kuala Lumpur |
| 16:45 UTC+08:00 | | | Diouf 45+2' (pen.); Shafuan 61' | Attendance: 3,500; Referee: Suhaizi Shukri |

| Friday 6 February | Penang | 1–0 | Kuantan | Bandaraya Stadium, Georgetown |
| 20:45 UTC+08:00 | Kwang-hyun 53' (o.g.) | | | Attendance: 5,544; Referee: Wan Mohd Tarmizi Wan Ibrahim |

| Friday 6 February | Kedah | 5–1 | SPA | Darul Aman Stadium, Alor Star |
| 20:45 UTC+08:00 | Hanif 23'; M Nah 48', 50'; Baddrol 60'; Edeh 90' | | Chukwubunna 68' | Attendance: 9,318; Referee: Mohd Fairuzi Mat Desa |

=== Week 2 ===
| Friday 13 February | SPA | 1–5 | Johor Darul Ta'zim II | MBPJ Stadium, Petaling Jaya |
| 16:45 UTC+08:00 | Chukwubunna 90+3' (pen.) | | Velázquez 34'; Shafiq 45+2', 63', 82'; Delmonte 79' | Attendance: 300; Referee: Suhaimi Mat Hassan |

| Friday 13 February | Kuala Lumpur | 2–1 | PKNS | UiTM Stadium, Shah Alam |
| 16:45 UTC+08:00 | Kallé 48'; Choi H.Y 61' | | Soto 33' | Attendance: 1,000; Referee: Mohd Fairuzi Mat Desa |

| Friday 13 February | Sabah | 3–2 | DRB-Hicom | Likas Stadium, Kota Kinabalu |
| 20:15 UTC+08:00 | Diouf 29'; Azzizan 75'; Shafuan 80' | | Babić 3'; A. Faye 21' (o.g.) | Attendance: 9,818; Referee: Ahmad Zuhaidi Dzulkifli |

| Friday 13 February | NS Matrix | 2–0 | UiTM | Tuanku Abdul Rahman Stadium, Seremban |
| 20:45 UTC+08:00 | Doe 40', 81' | | | Attendance: 7,000; Referee: Mohd Jefri Zolkefli |

| Friday 13 February | T-Team | 0–0 | Penang | Sultan Ismail Nasiruddin Shah Stadium, Kuala Terengganu |
| 20:45 UTC+08:00 | | | | Attendance: 550; Referee: Mohd Nafeez Abdul Wahab |

| Friday 13 February | Kuantan | 2–2 | Kedah | Darul Makmur Stadium, Kuantan |
| 20:45 UTC+08:00 | Abdul Malik 20'; Purović 33' (pen.) | | M Nah 9'; Baddrol 11' | Attendance: 1,600; Referee: Samsudin Ibrahim |

=== Week 3 ===
| Friday 20 February | SPA | 1–1 | NS Matrix | MBPJ Stadium, Petaling Jaya |
| 16:45 UTC+08:00 | Nik Azlam 82' | | Doe 22' | Attendance: 610; Referee: Sukri Abd. Rahman |

| Friday 20 February | UiTM | 2–1 | Sabah | UiTM Stadium, Shah Alam |
| 16:45 UTC+08:00 | Raslam Khan 25', 38' | | Diouf 45+1' (pen.) | Attendance: 1,500; Referee: Zulkarnain Zakaria |

| Friday 20 February | DRB-Hicom | 1–0 | Kuala Lumpur | Proton City Stadium, Tanjung Malim |
| 16:45 UTC+08:00 | Aiman 23' | | | Attendance: 350; Referee: Suhaimi Mat Hassan |

| Friday 20 February | Penang | 1–0 | PKNS | Bandaraya Stadium, Georgetown |
| 20:45 UTC+08:00 | Beto 44' | | | Attendance: 7,809; Referee: Syed Azhar Syed Kamar |

| Friday 20 February | Kedah | 0–0 | T-Team | Darulaman Stadium, Alor Star |
| 20:45 UTC+08:00 | | | | Attendance: 21,900; Referee: Kamal Ahmad |

| Friday 20 February | Johor Darul Ta'zim II | 5–2 | Kuantan | Pasir Gudang Corporation Stadium, Pasir Gudang |
| 20:45 UTC+08:00 | Shafiq 30', 59'; Shahril 37', 55'; Velázquez 74' | | Purovic 33'; Razren 78' | Attendance: 7,900; Referee: Khairul Rizal Ismail |

=== Week 4 ===
| Friday 6 March | PKNS | 2–1 | Kedah | MBPJ Stadium, Petaling Jaya |
| 16:45 UTC+08:00 | Farderin 16'; Guerra 87' | | Syafiq 90' | Attendance: 1,000; Referee: Suhaimi Mat Hassan |

| Friday 6 March | UiTM | 1–3 | DRB-Hicom | UiTM Stadium, Shah Alam |
| 16:45 UTC+08:00 | Abdi Kassim 31' | | Aris 9'; Fakhrullah 22'; Babić 66' | Attendance: 127; Referee: Ahmad Zuhaidi Dzulkifli |

| Friday 6 March | Sabah | 4–1 | SPA | Likas Stadium, Kota Kinabalu |
| 20:15 UTC+08:00 | Zuraindey 29'; Alphonso 31'; Zayed 48'; Izuan 64' | | Raja Mohd Hafillah 66' | Attendance: 8,800; Referee: Azman Jamaluddin |

| Friday 6 March | T-Team | 3–1 | Johor Darul Ta'zim II | Sultan Ismail Nasiruddin Shah Stadium, Kuala Terengganu |
| 20:45 UTC+08:00 | Tadjiyev 45' (pen.), 47'; Nor Hakim 89' | | Velázquez 72' |

| Friday 6 March | Kuantan | 1–3 | NS Matrix | Darul Makmur Stadium, Kuantan |
| 20:45 UTC+08:00 | Kyung-hyun 8' | | Shahrizal 1'; Doe 4', 72' | Attendance: 865; Referee: Wan Mohd Tarmizi Wan Ibrahim |

| Friday 6 March | Penang | 1–0 | Kuala Lumpur | Bandaraya Stadium, Georgetown |
| 20:45 UTC+08:00 | Faiz 38' | | | Attendance: 4,840; Referee: Mohd Fairuzi Mat Desa |

=== Week 5 ===
| Friday 13 March | SPA | 0–4 | DRB-Hicom | MBPJ Stadium, Petaling Jaya |
| 16:45 UTC+08:00 | | | Fakhrullah 42'; Babić 62', 68'; Hasrul 82' | Attendance: 100; Referee: Khairul Rizal Ismail |

| Friday 13 March | Kuala Lumpur | 0–1 | UiTM | UiTM Stadium, Shah Alam |
| 16:45 UTC+08:00 | | | Bakary 40' | Attendance: 300; Referee: Sukri Abd Rahman |

| Friday 13 March | Sabah | 2–0 | Kuantan | Likas Stadium, Kota Kinabalu |
| 20:15 UTC+08:00 | Zayed 30', 59' | | | Attendance: 10,000; Referee: Kamal Ahmad |

| Friday 13 March | Penang | 3–3 | Kedah | Bandaraya Stadium, Georgetown |
| 20:45 UTC+08:00 | Faiz 14'; Moreira 46', 90' | | Seung-hwan 4', 89'; Baddrol 14' | Attendance: 18,878; Referee: Samsudin Ibrahim |

| Friday 13 March | Johor Darul Ta'zim II | 2–2 | PKNS | Pasir Gudang Corporation Stadium, Pasir Gudang |
| 20:45 UTC+08:00 | Delmonte 21 (pen)' Shahril 73' | | Guerra 81'; Farderin 83' | Attendance: 6,280; Referee: Tiong Eng Tai |

| Friday 13 March | NS Matrix | 3–5 | T-Team | Tuanku Abdul Rahman Stadium, Seremban |
| 20:45 UTC+08:00 | Doe 26', 51'; Shahrizal 64' | | Nor Hakim 6', 61'; Abdullaev 23', 74'; Tadjiyev 46' | Attendance: 5000; Referee: Ahmad Zuhaidi Dzulkifli |

=== Week 6 ===
| Friday 3 April | PKNS | 1–1 | NS Matrix | MBPJ Stadium, Petaling Jaya |
| 16:45 UTC+08:00 | Guerra 75' | | Shahrizal 32' | Attendance: 300; Referee: Wan Zainudin Harun |

| Friday 3 April | UiTM | 3–1 | SPA | UiTM Stadium, Shah Alam |
| 16:45 UTC+08:00 | Bakary 5'; Hasrul 74'; Emuejeraye 86' (o.g.) | | Khairol Azry 20' | Attendance: 100; Referee: Raimin Rinduan |

| Friday 3 April | Kuala Lumpur | 0–1 | Kedah | Merdeka Stadium, Kuala Lumpur |
| 16:45 UTC+08:00 | | | Edeh 22' | Attendance: 800; Referee: Khairul Rizal Ismail |

| Friday 3 April | T-Team | 4–3 | Sabah | Sultan Ismail Nasiruddin Shah Stadium, Kuala Terengganu |
| 20:45 UTC+08:00 | Tadjiyev 8', 45'; Abdullaev 90'; Linus 90' (o.g.) | | Chianese 4', 17'; Zayed 63' | Attendance: 1,521; Referee: Zulkifli Ahmad |

| Friday 3 April | Penang | 2–1 | Johor Darul Ta'zim II | Bandaraya Stadium, Georgetown |
| 20:45 UTC+08:00 | Beto 90'; Moreira 90' | | Zaquan Adha 2' | Attendance: 9,427; Referee: Mohd Jeffrey Zolkefli |

| Friday 3 April | Kuantan | 2–1 | DRB-Hicom | Darul Makmur Stadium, Kuantan |
| 20:45 UTC+08:00 | Purovic 40', 84' | | Aminuddin 13' | Attendance: 405; Referee: Ramli Mat Dahan |

=== Week 7 ===
| Friday 10 April | Sabah | 1–1 | PKNS | Likas Stadium, Kota Kinabalu |
| 20:15 UTC+08:00 | Zayed 15' | | Farderin 76' | Attendance: 13,000; Referee: Azman Jamaluddin |

| Friday 10 April | SPA | 0–1 | Kuala Lumpur | MBPJ Stadium, Petaling Jaya |
| 16:45 UTC+08:00 | | | Soné 70' | Attendance: 100; Referee: Saiful Mohd Rodzali |

| Friday 10 April | DRB-Hicom | 1–2 | T-Team | Proton City Stadium, Tanjung Malim |
| 16:45 UTC+08:00 | Aris 90' | | Tadjiyev 41', 70' | Attendance: 250; Referee: Mohammad Almi |

| Friday 10 April | UiTM | 3–2 | Kuantan | UiTM Stadium, Shah Alam |
| 16:45 UTC+08:00 | Abdi 16'; Bakary 40', 72' | | Purović 85'; Noel 86' | Attendance: 200; Referee: Azham Musa |

| Sunday 12 April | Johor Darul Ta'zim II | 1–2 | Kedah | Pasir Gudang Corporation Stadium, Pasir Gudang |
| 20:45 UTC+08:00 | Leandro 86' | | Edeh 20'; Farhan 90' | Attendance: 4,396; Referee: Lismotia Mohem Mohd Tisan |

| Friday 8 May ^{1} | NS Matrix | 2–2 | Penang | Tuanku Abdul Rahman Stadium, Seremban |
| 20:45 UTC+08:00 | Sivanesan 58'; Thanabalan 89' | | Faiz 13', 90' | Attendance: 2,500; Referee: Mohd Zohri Tajuddin |

^{1}Match delayed due to bad weather.

=== Week 8 ===
| Friday 17 April | PKNS | 0–0 | DRB-Hicom | MBPJ Stadium, Petaling Jaya |
| 16:45 UTC+08:00 | | | | Attendance: 150; Referee: Sukri Abd Rahman |

| Friday 17 April | T-Team | 2–0 | UiTM | Sultan Ismail Nasiruddin Shah Stadium, Kuala Terengganu |
| 20:45 UTC+08:00 | Tadjiyev 8'; Abdullaev 47' | | Bakary 40' | Attendance: 768; Referee: Khairul Rizal Ismail |

| Friday 17 April | Sabah | 1–0 | Penang | Likas Stadium, Kota Kinabalu |
| 20:15 UTC+08:00 | Zayed 27' | | | Attendance: 15,000; Referee: Mohd Zohri Tajuddin |

| Friday 17 April | Kedah | 2–1 | NS Matrix | Darulaman Stadium, Alor Star |
| 20:45 UTC+08:00 | Edeh 12'; Liridon 83' | | Alexandre 76' | Attendance: 12,000; Referee: Nagor Amir Noor Mohamed |

| Friday 17 April | Kuala Lumpur | 1–1 | Johor Darul Ta'zim II | Merdeka Stadium, Kuala Lumpur |
| 16:45 UTC+08:00 | Hattaphon 18' | | Zameer 28' (o.g.) | Attendance: 1,200; Referee: Mohd Nazri Saptu |

| Friday 17 April | Kuantan | 1–0 | SPA | Darul Makmur Stadium, Kuantan |
| 20:45 UTC+08:00 | Purović 4' |

=== Week 9 ===
| Friday 24 April | UiTM | 1–4 | PKNS | UiTM Stadium, Shah Alam |
| 16:45 UTC+08:00 | Bakary 43' | | Aiman 46' (o.g.); Soto 58'; Amirruddin 80'; Guerra 90' | Attendance: 200; Referee: Sani Tari |

| Friday 24 April | SPA | 0–2 | T-Team | MBPJ Stadium, Petaling Jaya |
| 16:45 UTC+08:00 | | | Nor Hakim 47'; Tadjiyev 90' | Attendance: 100; Referee: S. Sittharajanan |

| Friday 24 April | Sabah | 1–2 | Kedah | Likas Stadium, Kota Kinabalu |
| 20:15 UTC+08:00 | Chianese 1' | | Edeh 47'; Syafiq 90' | Attendance: 19,000; Referee: Ahmad Zuhadi Dzulkifli |

| Friday 24 April | Kuantan | 3–3 | Kuala Lumpur | Darul Makmur Stadium, Kuantan |
| 20:45 UTC+08:00 | Afif 11'; Noel 15'; Purović 90' | | Hattaphon 23', 52'; Ogunboye 72' | Attendance: 250; Referee: Suhaimi Mat Hassan |

| Friday 26 April | DRB-Hicom | 1–1 | Penang | Hang Tuah Stadium, Malacca |
| 16:45 UTC+08:00 | Aminuddin 10' | | Kil-Hoon 64' (pen.) | Attendance: 100; Referee: Shaharudin Man |

| Friday 26 April | NS Matrix | 2–1 | Johor Darul Ta'zim II | Tuanku Abdul Rahman Stadium, Seremban |
| 20:45 UTC+08:00 | Doe 42'; Alexandre 61' | | Delmonte 44' | Attendance: 2315; Referee: Zulkifli Ahmad |

=== Week 10 ===
| Friday 1 May | PKNS | 0–0 | SPA | MBPJ Stadium, Petaling Jaya |
| 16:45 UTC+08:00 | | | | Attendance: 217; Referee: Saiful Mohd Rodzali |

| Friday 1 May | Johor Darul Ta'zim II | 2–4 | Sabah | Pasir Gudang Corporation Stadium, Pasir Gudang |
| 20:45 UTC+08:00 | Delmonte 8' (pen.); Shafiq 22' | | Faye 40'; Diouf 81'; Chianese 84'; Zayed 90' | Attendance: 3,500; Referee: Mohd Zohri Tajuddin |

| Friday 1 May | T-Team | 5–0 | Kuantan | Sultan Ismail Nasiruddin Shah Stadium, Kuala Terengganu |
| 20:45 UTC+08:00 | Takhiyuddin 45'; Nor Hakim 57'; Abdullaev 66'; Safawi 81'; Azrul 90+1' | | | Attendance: 726; Referee: Zulkarnain Zakaria |

| Friday 1 May | Kedah | 2–1 | DRB-Hicom | Darul Aman Stadium, Alor Star |
| 20:45 UTC+08:00 | Shakir 54'; Edeh 68' | | Fakhrullah 89' | Attendance: 18,400; Referee: Wan Zainuddin Harun |

| Friday 1 May | Penang | 3–0 | UiTM | Bandaraya Stadium, Georgetown |
| 20:45 UTC+08:00 | Kil-Hoon 39' (pen.); Darwira 90' | | | Attendance: 3,924; Referee: Zulkifli Ahmad |

| Friday 1 May | Kuala Lumpur | 1–0 | NS Matrix | Tuanku Abdul Rahman Stadium, Seremban |
| 20:45 UTC+08:00 | Konté 59' | | | Attendance: 2,234; Referee: Ahmad Zuhaidi Dzulkefli |

=== Week 11 ===
| Friday 19 June | UiTM | 2–2 | Kedah | Perak Stadium, Ipoh |
| 20:45 UTC+08:00 | Bakary 14'; Raslam Khan 21' | | Baddrol 52'; Sandro 74' | Attendance: 200; Referee: Mohd Fairuzi Mat Desa |

| Friday 19 June | SPA | 1–3 | Penang | Bandaraya Stadium, Georgetown |
| 20:45 UTC+08:00 | Norhafizzuan 79' | | Beto 2', 76'; Faiz 42' | Attendance: 1,499; Referee: Tiong Eng Tai |

| Friday 19 June | Kuala Lumpur | 1–2 | T-Team | Inspen Stadium, Bangi |
| 20:45 UTC+08:00 | Fairuz 70' | | Takhiyuddin 45'; Tadjiyev 90' | Attendance: 500; Referee: Azman Jamaluddin |

| Friday 19 June | Kuantan | 1–3 | PKNS | Darul Makmur Stadium, Kuantan |
| 20:45 UTC+08:00 | Purović 44' | | Guerra 56', 63', 76' | Attendance: 200; Referee: Zulkarnain Zakaria |

| Friday 19 June | DRB-Hicom | 0–1 | Johor Darul Ta'zim II | Hang Jebat Stadium, Malacca |
| 20:45 UTC+08:00 | | | Velázquez 81' | Attendance: 450; Referee: Khairul Rizal Ismail |

| Friday 19 June | NS Matrix | 1–3 | Sabah | Tuanku Abdul Rahman Stadium, Seremban |
| 20:45 UTC+08:00 | Doe 86' | | Linus 6'; Chianese 37'; Faye 42' | Attendance: 1,100; Referee: Ahmad Tajudin Mohd Yusof |

=== Week 12 ===
| Monday 22 June | Kedah | 3–1 | UiTM | Darul Aman Stadium, Alor Star |
| 20:45 UTC+08:00 | Syafiq A. 51', 55'; Baddrol 52' | | Raslam Khan 21' | Attendance: 200; Referee: Mohd Fairuzi Mat Desa |

| Monday 22 June | Penang | 4–1 | SPA | Bandaraya Stadium, Georgetown |
| 20:45 UTC+08:00 | Elias 64', 89'; Mat Saiful 73'; Beto 87' | | Dyachenko 79' | Attendance: 1,155; Referee: Saharudin Man |

| Monday 22 June | T-Team | 4–1 | Kuala Lumpur | Sultan Ismail Nasiruddin Shah Stadium, Kuala Terengganu |
| 20:45 UTC+08:00 | Takhiyuddin 4'; Tadjiyev 21'; Nor Hakim 36'; Milardovic 52' | | Konté 70' | Attendance: 1,000; Referee: Mohd Noor Abd Rahman |

| Monday 22 June | PKNS | 3–2 | Kuantan | Hang Jebat Stadium, Malacca |
| 20:45 UTC+08:00 | Gunalan 49'; Guerra 64', 68' | | Razren 35'; Muszaki 90' | Attendance: 105; Referee: S. Sittharajan |

| Monday 22 June | Johor Darul Ta'zim II | 2–2 | DRB-Hicom | Pasir Gudang Corporation Stadium, Pasir Gudang |
| 20:45 UTC+08:00 | Akmal 46'; Akram 51' | | Babic 58'; Ashadi 65' | Attendance: 790; Referee: Sani Tari |

| Monday 22 June | Sabah | 2–2 | NS Matrix | Likas Stadium, Kota Kinabalu |
| 20:15 UTC+08:00 | Zayed 23'; Diouf 79' | | Azizi 34'; Martelotto 63' | Attendance: 3,500; Referee: Mohd Jefri Zolkefli |

=== Week 13 ===
| Friday 26 June | T-Team | 3–1 | PKNS | Sultan Ismail Nasiruddin Shah Stadium, Kuala Terengganu |
| 20:45 UTC+08:00 | Tadjiyev 29', 52', 68' | | Soto 21' | Attendance: 622; Referee: Kamal Ahmad |

| Friday 26 June | Johor Darul Ta'zim II | 1–0 | UiTM | Pasir Gudang Corporation Stadium, Pasir Gudang |
| 20:45 UTC+08:00 | Irfan 78' | | | Attendance: 880; Referee: Zulkarnain Zakaria |

| Friday 26 June | NS Matrix | 1–0 | DRB-Hicom | Tuanku Abdul Rahman Stadium, Seremban |
| 20:45 UTC+08:00 | Thanabalan 17' | | | Attendance: 750; Referee: S. Jayaraman |

| Friday 26 June | Sabah | 1–0 | Kuala Lumpur | Likas Stadium, Kota Kinabalu |
| 20:15 UTC+08:00 | Faizol Nazlin 45+2' (pen.) | | | Attendance: 4,700; Referee: Khairul Rizal Ismail |

| Friday 26 June | Kuantan | 1–3 | Penang | Darul Makmur Stadium, Kuantan |
| 20:45 UTC+08:00 | Abdul Malik 11' | | Beto 80'; Elias 89'; Faiz 90' | Attendance: 205; Referee: Wan Mohd Tarmizi Wan Ibrahim |

| Friday 26 June | SPA | 1–2 | Kedah | Darul Aman Stadium, Alor Star |
| 20:45 UTC+08:00 | Khairol Azry 2' | | Liridon 15'; Edeh 73' | Attendance: 5,000; Referee: Mohd Jefri Zolkifli |

=== Week 14 ===
| Wednesday 1 July | PKNS | 4–0 | Kuala Lumpur | Hang Jebat Stadium, Malacca |
| 20:45 UTC+08:00 | Guerra 15'; Wleh 59'; Faiz 71'; Farderin 90' | | | Attendance: 150; Referee: Azman Jamaluddin |

| Friday 3 July | Penang | 1–1 | T-Team | Bandaraya Stadium, Georgetown |
| 20:45 UTC+08:00 | Moreira 24' | | Tadjiyev 31' (pen.) | Attendance: 5,810; Referee: Zulkifli Ahmad |

| Friday 3 July | Kedah | 2–2 | Kuantan | Darulaman Stadium, Alor Star |
| 20:45 UTC+08:00 | Syafiq 13', 17'; Krasniqi 58' | | Zambri 71'; Noel 79' | Attendance: 1,600; Referee: Samsudin Ibrahim |

| Friday 3 July | UiTM | 2–2 | NS Matrix | Tuanku Abdul Rahman Stadium, Seremban |
| 20:45 UTC+08:00 | Bakary 20' (pen.); Abdi 25' | | Doe 40' (pen.); Rezal 86' | Attendance: 500; Referee: Zulkarnain Zakaria |

| Friday 3 July | DRB-Hicom | 2–1 | Sabah | Likas Stadium, Kota Kinabalu |
| 20:45 UTC+08:00 | Babić 8'; Fakrul 33' | | Diouf 64' (pen.) | Attendance: 350; Referee: Zamzaidi Katimin |

| Friday 3 July | Johor Darul Ta'zim II | 1–0 | SPA | Pasir Gudang Corporation Stadium, Pasir Gudang |
| 20:45 UTC+08:00 | Irfan 78' | | | Attendance: 970; Referee: Khairul Rizal Ismail |

== Season statistics ==
=== Top scorers ===
As of 22 October 2015.

| Rank | Player | Club | Goals |
|---|---|---|---|
| 1 | (Liberia) Francis Doe | NS Matrix | 17 |
| 2 | (Argentina) Gabriel Guerra | PKNS | 16 |
| 3 | (Uzbekistan) Farhod Tadjiyev | T-Team | 15 |
| 4 | (Nigeria) Chidi Edeh | Kedah | 11 |
| 5 | (Ivory Coast) Dao Bakary | UiTM | 10 |
| 5 | (Montenegro) Milan Purović | Kuala Lumpur | 10 |
| 5 | (Libya) Éamon Zayed | Sabah | 10 |
| 8 | (Brazil) Sandro Mendonça | Kedah | 9 |
| 8 | (Croatia) Tomislav Bušić | T-Team | 9 |
| 8 | (Uzbekistan) Sadriddin Abdullaev | T-Team | 9 |
| 8 | (Malaysia) Mohd Faiz Subri | Penang | 9 |
| 8 | (Croatia) Ivan Babić | DRB-Hicom | 9 |
| 13 | (Brazil) Hilton Moreira | Penang | 8 |
| 13 | (Senegal) El Hadji Diouf | Sabah | 8 |
| 15 | (Australia) Joel Chianese | Sabah | 7 |
| 15 | (Malaysia) Shafiq Shaharuddin | Johor Darul Ta'zim II | 7 |
| 15 | (Brazil) Beto | Penang | 7 |
| 18 | (Haiti) Fabrice Noël | Kuala Lumpur | 6 |
| 18 | (Argentina) Gonzalo Soto | PKNS | 6 |
| 18 | (Malaysia) Syafiq Ahmad | Kedah | 6 |
| 18 | (Malaysia) Nor Hakim Hassan | T-Team | 6 |
| 18 | (Singapore) Shahril Ishak | Johor Darul Ta'zim II | 6 |
| 18 | (Argentina) Leandro Velázquez | Johor Darul Ta'zim II | 6 |
| 24 | (Liberia) Patrick Wleh | PKNS | 5 |
| 24 | (Malaysia) Elias Sulaiman | Penang | 5 |
| 24 | (Kosovo) Liridon Krasniqi | Kedah | 5 |
| 24 | (Tanzania) Abdi Kassim | UiTM | 5 |
| 24 | (Malaysia) Raslam Khan | UiTM | 5 |
| 29 | (Malaysia) Azniee Taib | Penang | 4 |
| 29 | (Malaysia) Shahrizal Saad | Negeri Sembilan | 4 |
| 29 | (Malaysia) Khairol Azry | SPA | 4 |
| 29 | (Malaysia) Fakhrul Aiman | DRB-Hicom | 4 |
| 29 | (South Korea) Bang Seung-hwan | Kedah | 4 |
| 29 | (Malaysia) Baddrol Bakhtiar | Kedah | 4 |
| 29 | (Malaysia) Zaquan Adha | Johor Darul Ta'zim II | 4 |
| 29 | (Argentina) Nicolás Delmonte | Johor Darul Ta'zim II | 4 |

== Champions ==
2015 Malaysia Premier league Winner

Kedah
4th Title

=== Hat-tricks ===
| Player | For | Against | Result | Date |
|---|---|---|---|---|
| (Malaysia) Shafiq Shaharuddin | Johor Darul Ta'zim II | SPA | 1–5 | 13 February 2015 |
| (Argentina) Gabriel Guerra | PKNS | Kuantan | 1–3 | 19 June 2015 |
| (Uzbekistan) Farhod Tadjiyev | T-Team | PKNS | 3–1 | 26 June 2015 |
| (Nigeria) Chidi Edeh | Kedah | Johor Darul Ta'zim II | 3–2 | 11 August 2015 |
| (Croatia) Tomislav Bušić | T-Team | SPA | 7–0 | 18 August 2015 |
| (Brazil) Sandro Mendonça | Kedah | DRB-Hicom | 1–5 | 22 August 2015 |

=== Own goals ===
| Rank | Player | For | Club | Own Goal |
|---|---|---|---|---|
| 1 | (South Korea) Lee Kwang-hyun | Penang | Kuantan | 1 |
| 1 | (Senegal) Abdoulaye Faye | DRB-Hicom | Sabah | 1 |
| 1 | (Singapore) Precious Emuejeraye | UiTM | SPA | 1 |
| 1 | (Malaysia) Aiman Syazwan Abdullah | PKNS | UiTM | 1 |
| 1 | (Malaysia) Zameer Zainun | Johor Darul Ta'zim II | Kuala Lumpur | 1 |

=== Scoring ===
- First goal of the season: Shahril Ishak for Johor Darul Ta'zim II against UiTM (6 February 2015)
- Fastest goal of the season: 1 Minute – Shahrizal Saad for NS Matrix against Kuantan (6 March 2015)
- Largest winning margin: 7 goals
  - T-Team 7–0 SPA (18 August 2015)
- Highest scoring game: 8 goals
  - NS Matrix 3–5 T-Team (13 March 2015)
- Most goals scored in a match by a single team: 7 goals
  - T-Team 7–0 SPA (18 August 2015)
- Most goals scored in a match by a losing team: 3 goals
  - NS Matrix 3–5 T-Team (13 March 2015)

== Transfers ==
For recent transfers, see List of Malaysian football transfers 2015

== See also ==
- 2015 Liga Super
- 2015 Liga FAM
- 2015 Piala FA
- 2015 Piala Presiden
- 2015 Piala Belia
