= Jerome Suku Doe =

Liberian football player (born 1992)

Personal information
- Full name: Jerome Suku Doe
- Date of birth: November 11, 1992 (age 33)
- Place of birth: Monrovia, Liberia
- Height: 1.84 m (6 ft 1/2 in)
- Position: Center forward

Team information
- Current team: Lao Toyota FC
- Number: 27

Youth career
- 2009: Gardnersville FC

Senior career*
Years	Team	Apps	(Gls)
2010–2011	Monrovia Club Breweries FC	20	(15)
2011–2012	El Seka El Hadid	26	(16)
2013–2014	Anges De Notse	17	(12)
2014	Sabah	2	(0)
2015–2016	Lao Toyota FC	12	(8)

International career^{‡}
2004–2016	Liberia	9	(7)
- * Club domestic league appearances and goals as of 31 November 2016 ‡ National team caps and goals as of 31 October 2016

Jerome Suku Doe (born November 11, 1992) is a Liberian former football player who played as a center forward.

== Career ==
He have a short spell with Malaysian League team Sabah in 2014. He only made two appearances against Penang and Felda United.

== External ==
- liberiaentertainment.com
- Jerome Suku Doe at Soccerway (archived)
- libfootball.com
- Jerome Suku Doe on Facebook
