= Andrezinho (footballer, born 1982) =

Brazilian footballer

Personal information
- Full name: André Reinaldo de Souza Esposito
- Date of birth: 11 August 1982 (age 44)
- Place of birth: Santo André, Brazil
- Height: 1.70 m (5 ft 7 in)
- Position: Attacking midfielder

Youth career
- Matsubara

Senior career*
Years	Team	Apps	(Gls)
1999–2005	Fluminense		
2005–2006	Sabah FA		
2006–2007	Kazma		
2007–2008	Al Salmiya		
2008–2009	Al-Ansar Beirut		
2010	Borac Čačak	6	(0)
2010–2012	Foolad	38	(3)
2012–2013	Tarxien Rainbows	27	(8)
2014	Ipatinga		
2014–2016	Sabah FA		
- * Club domestic league appearances and goals

André Reinaldo de Souza Esposito (born 11 August 1982), commonly known as Andrezinho, is a Brazilian retired professional footballer.

== Career ==
=== Youth ===
He started playing in Brazil with Matsubara in 1999, before joining Fluminense. With Fluminense, he won the Oberndorf Tournament Under-19 in 2001 scoring in the final against VfB Stuttgart and the Campeonato Carioca in 2002.

=== Senior ===
In August 2002, he went on trial to Russian FC Spartak Moscow, but left the club after three days and returned to Fluminense until 2005 when he moved to Malaysia to play for Sabah FA. Between 2006 and 2009, he played in Kuwait, first with Kazma Sporting Club where he won the following titles: Al khurafi Cup and Al Hasawy Super Cup and later with Al Salmiya Club, qualifying with the club to the Asian Football Confederation. In 2009, he had a short spell in Lebanon with Al-Ansar SC before moving in January 2010 back to Europe to play in Serbian SuperLiga with FK Borac Čačak. From there, Andrezinho returned to the Middle East, more precisely to Iran, where defending Foolad FC for two seasons. In 2012, the player move to island of Malta becoming part of Tarxien Rainbows FC club with which he broke the fastest goal record of League Maltese on 27 April 2013, with just 20 seconds of play, and attending the best campaign of all time from the foundation club, In 2014, Andre returned to Brazil and signed with Ipatinga FC to play the Campeonato Mineiro. In 2014, he returned to Malaysia to defend the red T-shirt of Rhinos again with Sabah FA. but failed to impress the team due to disciplinary issues and being unpaid for five months' salary.
