= Guy Bwelle =

Cameroonian footballer

Personal information
- Full name: Guy Bwelle
- Date of birth: 16 February 1979 (age 47)
- Place of birth: Edéa, Cameroon
- Position: Midfielder

Youth career
- L'Espoir de Yaoundé

Senior career*
| Years | Team | Apps | (Gls) |
| –1998 | Cintra de Yaoundé | | |
| 1998–2000 | Apollon Smyrnis | 20 | (1) |
| 2000–2003 | Apollon Kalamarias | | |
| 2003–2004 | Kassandra | | |
| 2004–2006 | Olympiacos Volos | | |
| 2006–2007 | Ergotelis | 5 | (0) |
| Total | | ? | (?) |
- * Club domestic league appearances and goals

Guy Bwelle (born 16 February 1979) is a retired footballer who played as a midfielder for a number of clubs in Cameroon and Greece.

== Club career ==
Born in Edéa, Bwelle began playing youth football with L'Espoir de Yaoundé. At age 18, he had a trial with Swiss club FC Servette and hoped to play in Europe, but had to return to Cameroon where he played for Cintra de Yaoundé.

Bwelle moved to Greece to play in the Greek first division with Apollon Smyrnis in July 1998. He would make 20 league appearances for the club before moving to Apollon Kalamarias F.C. in January 2000.

After playing 3.5 seasons in the Greek second division with Apollon Kalamarias, Bwelle joined fellow second division club Kassandra F.C., which soon was taken over by Olympiacos Volos. He spend another three seasons in the second division with Kassandra and Olympiacos Volos.

In July 2006, Bwelle returned to the Greek top flight by signing with Ergotelis, but he would only make five league appearances for the club.

== Controversy ==
In July 2007, another footballer from Cameroon with the same name was on trial with Norwegian club IK Start, and the Norwegian football authorities had expressed concern that he had falsely used Bwelle's identity.
