= Fadhil Hashim =

Malaysian footballer

Mohd Fadhil
Personal information
- Full name: Mohd Fadhil Mohd Hashim
- Date of birth: 2 July 1983 (age 43)
- Place of birth: Selangor, Malaysia
- Height: 1.78 m (5 ft 10 in)
- Position: Defender

Team information
- Current team: Malaysian University F.T. (assistant)

Youth career
- 2005: Selangor President's Team

Senior career*
Years	Team	Apps	(Gls)
2006–2007	Selangor FA		
2007–2013	PKNS FC		
2013	Negeri Sembilan FA		
2014–2015	PDRM FA		
2016	Kuala Lumpur FA		
- * Club domestic league appearances and goals

Mohd Fadhil Mohd Hashim (born 2 July 1983) is a Malaysian former professional footballer.

== Honours ==
=== Club ===
PDRM

- Malaysia Premier League: 2014
