= Rafael Novais =

Brazilian footballer

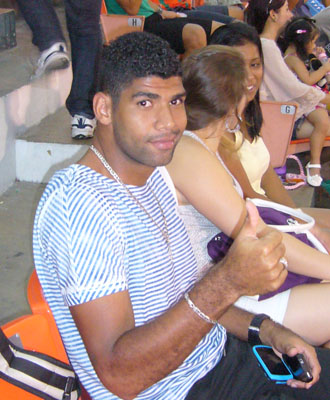

Personal information
- Full name: Rafael Souza Silva Novais
- Date of birth: January 13, 1984 (age 42)
- Place of birth: Rio de Janeiro, Brazil
- Height: 1.99 m (6 ft 6 1/2 in)
- Positions: Defender; striker

Youth career
- 1998–2000: Bahia

Senior career*
Years	Team	Apps	(Gls)
2001–2004	Ponte Preta	92	(12)
2006–2007	América-SP	75	(5)
2007–2009	Palmeiras	53	(8)
2010	Rio Branco	43	(6)
2011	Buriram United	4	(0)
2011–2012	Bangkok Glass	32	(2)
2013	Perak	22	(0)
2014	PDRM FA	19	(3)
- * Club domestic league appearances and goals as of 24 July 2013

Rafael Souza Silva Novais is a Brazilian footballer. Rafaiel is described as a 'towering defender'.

== Career ==
Rafael has played in his native land Brazil for 4 different clubs, and also in Thailand with Bangkok Glass and Buriram United.

In December 2012, Rafael signed with Malaysia Super League team, Perak for 2013 Malaysia Super League season. He becomes a pillar of the Perak's defense since joining the team.

Rafael joined PDRM FA in December 2013 for the 2014 Malaysia Premier League campaign.
