= Regino (footballer) =

Spanish footballer (born 1988)

Personal information
- Full name: José Franco Gómez
- Date of birth: 26 December 1988 (age 37)
- Place of birth: San Fernando, Spain
- Height: 1.82 m (5 ft 11 1/2 in)
- Position: Right back

Team information
- Current team: Los Barrios

Youth career
- Atlético Constituición
- Sporting Bahía
- UD San Fernando
- 2005–2007: Sevilla

Senior career*
Years	Team	Apps	(Gls)
2005	UD San Fernando		
2007–2009	CD San Fernando	44	(0)
2009–2011	Betis B	28	(2)
2011–2012	Jerez	17	(1)
2012	San Fernando CD	3	(0)
2012	BEC Tero Sasana	?	(1)
2013–2014	Kedah FA	?	(1)
2015	Olympiakos Nicosia	14	(1)
2016–2017	San Fernando CD	34	(1)
2017–2018	Ebro	32	(0)
2018	Xerez Deportivo	16	(0)
2019	Calahorra	9	(0)
2020–	Los Barrios	1	(0)
- * Club domestic league appearances and goals as of 8 November 2020

José Franco Gómez (born 26 December 1988), commonly known as Regino, is a Spanish footballer who plays for UD Los Barrios. Mainly a right back, he can also play as a central defender or a defensive midfielder.

== Club career ==
Born in San Fernando, Cádiz, Regino joined Sevilla FC's youth setup in 2005, after already making his debut as a senior with UD San Fernando. In 2009, after two full seasons at CD San Fernando, he moved to Sevilla's fierce rivals Real Betis and was assigned to the reserves in Segunda División B.

Regino left the Verdiblancos in June 2011, after being linked to Segunda División club Recreativo de Huelva. The move never materialised, and he subsequently joined Jerez CF of Tercera División. On 31 January of the following year, he signed for San Fernando CD also in the fourth tier.

On 13 March 2012, Regino moved abroad for the first time in his career, signing with Thai Premier League side BEC Tero Sanana FC. In 2013 he switched teams and countries again, joining Kedah FA from Malaysia.

On 31 August 2015, Regino moved to Cypriot Second Division club Olympiakos Nicosia. After returning to his country, he continued to compete exclusively in the lower leagues.
