= Obi Ikechukwu Charles =

Nigerian footballer (born 1985)

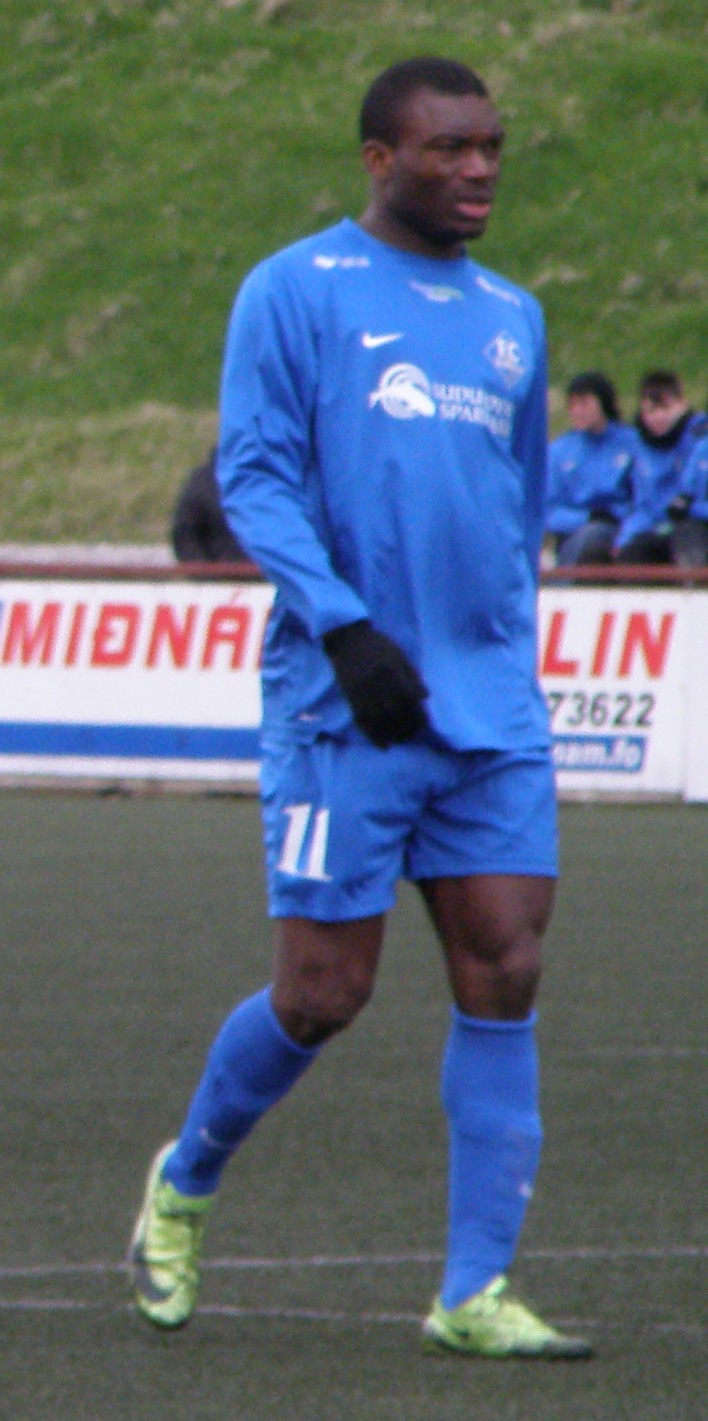
- Charles when he was playing for FC Suðuroy

Personal information
- Date of birth: 6 April 1985 (age 41)
- Place of birth: Nigeria
- Height: 1.86 m (6 ft 1 in)
- Position: Forward

Senior career*
Years	Team	Apps	(Gls)
2004–2005	Ellas Fc		
2005–2006	Pallokerho-35	15	(7)
2006–2007	Sabah FA	20	(29)
2007–2008	Boavista	4	(2)
2008–2009	Doxa Katokopia	5	(3)
2009–2010	Flamurtari	18	(5)
2010	FC Suðuroy	14	(6)
2010–2011	Yangon United	28	(31)
2012–2013	Kanbawza	35	(27)
2014	UiTM	15	(12)
2016	Sime Darby	7	(4)
- * Club domestic league appearances and goals

Obi Ikechukwu Charles (born 6 April 1985) is a Nigerian former professional footballer who played as a forward.

== Honours ==
Individual

- Myanmar National League Top Scorer: 2011
