= Braulio Nóbrega =

Spanish footballer

Braulio
Personal information
- Full name: Braulio Nóbrega Rodríguez
- Date of birth: 18 September 1985 (age 41)
- Place of birth: Puerto del Rosario, Spain
- Height: 1.78 m (5 ft 10 in)
- Position: Forward

Youth career
- 2002–2004: Atlético Madrid

Senior career*
Years	Team	Apps	(Gls)
2004–2006	Atlético Madrid B	29	(17)
2004–2008	Atlético Madrid	11	(0)
2006	→ Mallorca (loan)	2	(0)
2006–2007	→ Salamanca (loan)	39	(14)
2007–2008	→ Getafe (loan)	19	(3)
2008–2011	Zaragoza	56	(6)
2010	→ Recreativo (loan)	20	(2)
2012	Cartagena	18	(6)
2012–2013	Hércules	14	(5)
2013–2014	Johor Darul Takzim	0	(0)
2014–2015	Recreativo	24	(0)
2016	Kalloni	5	(0)
2016	Caudal	10	(2)
2017	Doxa	15	(10)
2017–2018	Bengaluru	10	(0)
2018–2019	Alcoyano	18	(3)
Total		290	(68)

International career
2005	Spain U20	1	(0)
- * Club domestic league appearances and goals

Braulio Nóbrega Rodríguez (born 18 September 1985), known simply as Braulio, is a Spanish former professional footballer who played as a forward.

== Club career ==
Braulio was born in Puerto del Rosario, Canary Islands. Having grown through the youth system of Atlético Madrid, he played 11 La Liga games for the Colchoneros between 2004 and 2006 (ten being in his debut season) before being loaned to RCD Mallorca in January 2006 and Segunda División's UD Salamanca in 2006–07, finishing the campaign as the latter team's top scorer.

Braulio was loaned again in 2007–08, this time to Madrid-based Getafe CF, where he teamed up again with Manu del Moral who had played with him in Atlético's youth squads. On 25 October 2007, he scored through a backheel in a 2–1 win over Tottenham Hotspur at White Hart Lane in the group stage of the UEFA Cup. He also netted his team's third and final goal in the competition's quarter-final second leg match against FC Bayern Munich, capitalising on a defensive mistake by Lúcio in the box and proceeding to put the ball past Oliver Kahn in a 3–3 home draw (4–4 aggregate loss).

On 28 June 2008, Braulio signed a four-year contract with Real Zaragoza, recently relegated to the second tier. He was relatively used as the Aragonese were immediately promoted to the top flight, but then suffered an injury which sidelined him for several months. Upon return in late 2009 he found himself without room in the first team and, on 23 January 2010, was loaned to Recreativo de Huelva, as another forward, Adrián Colunga, moved on loan in the opposite direction.

In January 2012, after being released by Zaragoza and sorting out his legal problems, Braulio joined FC Cartagena of division two. He scored six goals in only four and a half months, not enough however to help the Murcian team avoid relegation. In July he joined another club in that league, Hércules CF.

In summer 2014, following an unassuming spell in Malaysia, Braulio signed with Millonarios FC, being released shortly after and taking the Colombian club to court. The same situation occurred with another side in the country, Patriotas FC, but an amicable settlement was reached.

Braulio spent the 2014–15 season with Recreativo de Huelva, failing to score in 25 competitive appearances and also suffering relegation. On 4 January 2016, after a trial, he joined AEL Kalloni F.C. from the Super League Greece until June.

On 7 September 2016, Braulio returned to his country after signing with Caudal Deportivo of Segunda División B. In August 2017, he agreed to a one-year contract at Indian Super League club Bengaluru FC, being released in February 2018 due to injury and replaced by countryman Dani Segovia.

== Personal life ==
On 21 September 2011, Braulio was arrested on a charge of sexual assault, which occurred in a town near Zaragoza – Cuarte de Huerva – shortly before Real Zaragoza's morning training. He was not incarcerated immediately, and the following day pleaded guilty, being ousted from the squad until the situation was cleared and released by the club the following month.

Braulio changed his plea to "not guilty" on 18 October 2011, citing poor advice as the reason for this sudden change. Finally, on 22 June of the following year, he avoided a prison sentence and reached an agreement to pay €11,400 in damages.

== Career statistics ==
As of match played on 26 January 2018

Club	Season	League			Cup		Other		Total	
Club	Season	Division	Apps	Goals	Apps	Goals	Apps	Goals	Apps	Goals
Atlético Madrid B	2004–05	Segunda División B	10	9	—		—		10	9
Atlético Madrid B	2005–06	Segunda División B	19	8	—		—		19	8
Atlético Madrid B	Total		29	17	—		—		29	17
Atlético Madrid	2004–05	La Liga	10	0	4	3	—		14	3
Atlético Madrid	2005–06	La Liga	1	0	0	0	—		1	0
Atlético Madrid	2006–07	La Liga	0	0	0	0	2 (Note: Appearances in UEFA Intertoto Cup)	0	2	0
Atlético Madrid	Total		11	0	4	3	2	0	17	3
Mallorca (loan)	2005–06	La Liga	2	0	0	0	—		2	0
Salamanca (loan)	2006–07	Segunda División	39	14	1	0	—		40	14
Getafe (loan)	2007–08	La Liga	19	3	8	0	10 (Note: Appearances in UEFA Cup)	3	37	6
Zaragoza	2008–09	Segunda División	24	3	0	0	—		24	3
Zaragoza	2009–10	La Liga	3	0	0	0	—		3	0
Zaragoza	2010–11	La Liga	27	3	2	0	—		29	3
Zaragoza	2011–12	La Liga	2	0	0	0	—		2	0
Zaragoza	Total		56	6	2	0	—		58	6
Recreativo (loan)	2009–10	Segunda División	20	2	0	0	—		20	2
Cartagena	2011–12	Segunda División	18	6	0	0	—		18	6
Hércules	2012–13	Segunda División	14	5	0	0	—		14	5
Recreativo	2014–15	Segunda División	24	0	1	0	—		25	0
Kalloni	2015–16	Super League Greece	5	0	0	0	—		5	0
Caudal	2016–17	Segunda División B	10	2	1	0	—		11	2
Doxa	2016–17	Cypriot First Division	15	10	4	2	—		19	12
Bengaluru	2017–18	Indian Super League	10	0	—		—		10	0
Career total			272	65	21	5	12	3	305	73
