= Lee Kil-Hoon =

South Korean footballer (born 1983)

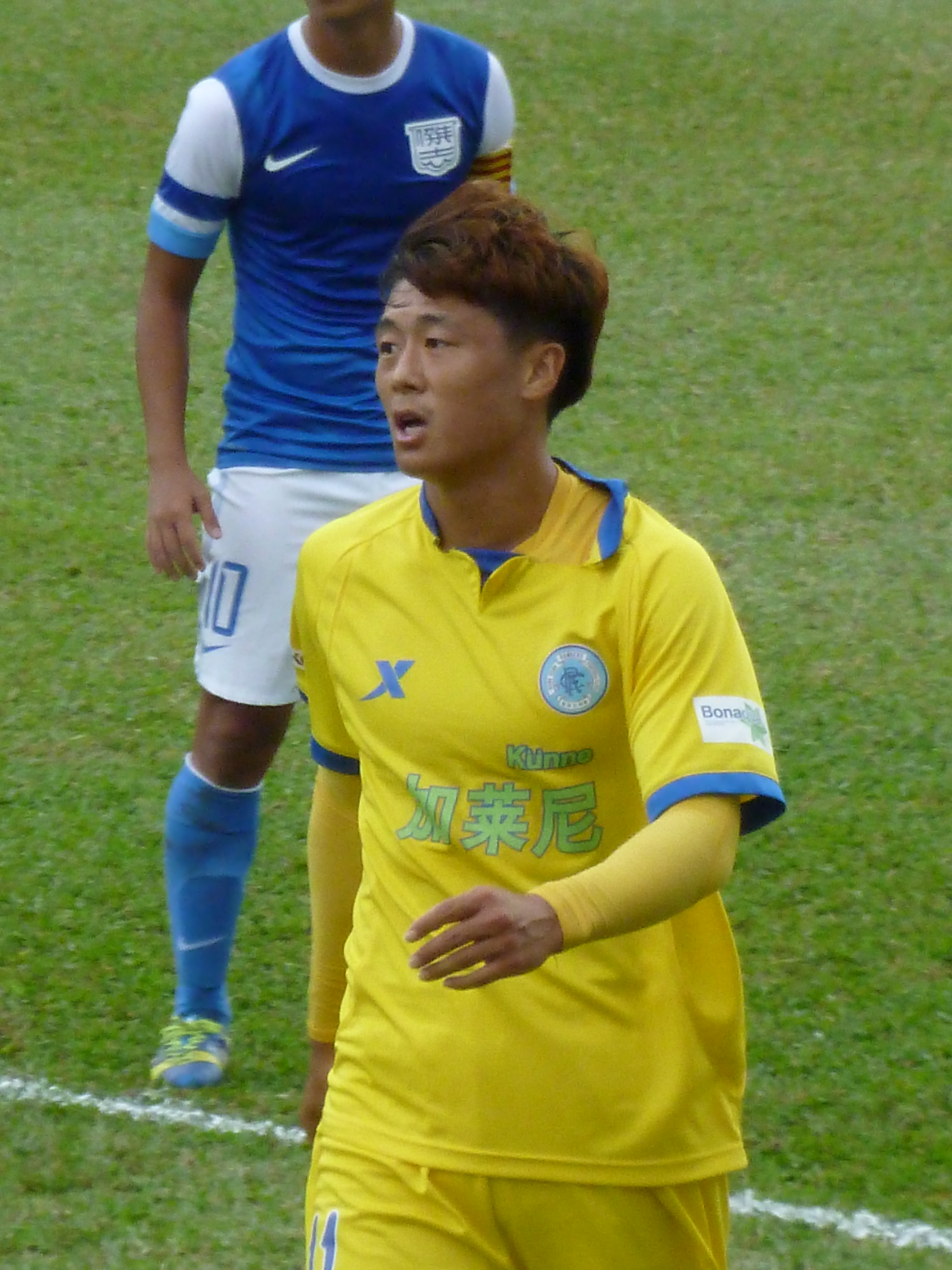
- Lee in 2013

Personal information
- Date of birth: March 6, 1983 (age 43)
- Place of birth: South Korea
- Height: 1.78 m (5 ft 10 in)
- Position: Midfielder

Youth career
- 2003–2005: Korea University

Senior career*
Years	Team	Apps	(Gls)
2006–2010	Suwon Bluewings	35	(3)
2007–2008	→ Gwangju Sangmu	34	(1)
2010–2011	Busan I'Park	12	(0)
2012	Hohhot Dongjin	29	(10)
2013	Guizhou Zhicheng	15	(4)
2013	Hong Kong Rangers	7	(3)
2014–2015	Penang FA	22	(15)
2016	Sime Darby	12	(2)
2016	Semen Padang	9	(1)
2017	Biu Chun Glory Sky	9	(1)
2017–2018	Sabah FA	16	(7)
2018–2020	TNT	10	(0)

International career
	South Korea U20	6	(0)
- * Club domestic league appearances and goals

Lee Kil-Hoon or Lee Gil-hoon (born March 6, 1983) is a South Korean former professional footballer who played as a midfielder.

== Club career ==
In 2006, Lee joined K-League side Suwon Samsung Bluewings. He then transferred to Gwangju Sangmu before return to Suwon in 2009. He played his last season for the club before joining Busan I'Park in 2010. In 2012, Lee transferred to Chinese side, Hohhot Dongjin before joining another Chinese club, Guizhou Zhicheng in 2013. He then played in Hong Kong for Hong Kong Rangers.

In December 2013, Lee moved to Penang FA after impressed in a trial match against Kelantan FA. He made his debut on 21 January 2014 against Sarawak FA in the Malaysia FA Cup. He made his league debut in a 3–1 home win over Sabah FA on 24 January. Lee scored his first league goal against UiTM FC on 7 February. Overall, he scored 15 league goals but failed to help Penang earn promotion to Malaysia Super League. He also scored twice in 2014 Malaysia Cup campaign.

In 2016, Lee signed with Malaysia Premier League club Sime Darby.

In January 2017, he joined Biu Chun Glory Sky.

In May 2017, Lee signed to Malaysian side Sabah He made his debut against Kuantan and scored his first goal for Sabah On 30 June 2017, Sabah also obtained three points in a 1–0 win over Royal Malaysian Police PDRM at the Hang Jebat Stadium in Melaka. Lee scored the winning goal in the 77th minute of match.

== International career ==
Lee received his first call up to the South Korea under-20 side in 2003.

== Career statistics ==
Club performance			League		Cup		League Cup		Continental		Total	
Season	Club	League	Apps	Goals	Apps	Goals	Apps	Goals	Apps	Goals	Apps	Goals
South Korea			League		KFA Cup		League Cup		Asia		Total	
2006	Suwon Bluewings	K-League	11	0	1	0	10	0	-		22	0
2007	Gwangju Sangmu	K-League	24	0	0	0	9	0	-		33	0
2008	Gwangju Sangmu	K-League	10	1	1	0	3	0	-		14	1
2009	Suwon Bluewings	K-League							-			
2010	Suwon Bluewings	K-League							-			
2011	Busan I'Park	K-League							-			
China			League		Cup		League Cup		Asia		Total	
2012	Hohhot Dongjin	China League One										
2013	Guizhou Zhicheng	China League One										
Hong Kong			League		Cup		League Cup		Asia		Total	
2013-14	Hong Kong Rangers	Hong Kong First Division League										

== Honours ==
Suwon Samsung Bluewings

- K League runner-up: 2006
- Korean FA Cup runner-up: 2006

Busan IPark

- Korean League Cup runner-up: 2011

Penang FA

- Malaysia Premier League runner-up: 2015
