= Guy Bwele =

Cameroonian footballer

Personal information
- Date of birth: 16 February 1984 (age 42)
- Place of birth: Yaoundé, Cameroon
- Height: 1.79 m (5 ft 10 in)
- Positions: Centre-back; defensive midfielder

Youth career
- 1998–1999: C. Yaounde
- 1999–2000: GSA Athen
- 2000–2003: Apollon Smyrnis

Senior career*
Years	Team	Apps	(Gls)
2003–2005	Olympiacos Volos	21	(1)
2006–2007	Ergotelis	20	(4)
2007	IK Start	17	(2)
2008–2011	Coton Sport FC de Garoua	38	(6)
2011–2013	Sarawak FA	51	(10)
2015	Hobart Zebras		

International career
2007	Cameroon	6	(0)
- * Club domestic league appearances and goals

Guy Bwele (born 16 February 1984) is a Cameroonian former professional footballer who played as a centre-back or as a defensive midfielder.

Bwele was always confused with Guy Bwelle, which caused some controversy.

== Career ==
Bwele played for Sports Etudes in his homeland before attending a trial with Norwegian football club, IK Start in 2007. He played in a friendly game with IK Start against FC Copenhagen. However, caused by a great controversy (see controversy), Bwele failed to get a contract.

He returned to Cameroon with local club, Coton Sport FC de Garoua.

In early November 2011, Bwele joined the Malaysian club, Sarawak FA in the Malaysia Super League, signing a two-year contract alongside fellow countrymen, Kalle Sone. Bwele was made captain for the game against Johor FC on 14 February 2012 in the absence of regular captain Mohd Hairol Mokhtar, and scored his first goal for the team as Sarawak won the game 2–1 having trailed the match 1–0.

Bwele first season with Sarawak ended with disappointment as Sarawak were relegated to Premier League having losing the end-of-season relegation playoff match. However, in his second year with Sarawak, Bwele helped Sarawak to clinch the 2013 Malaysia Premier League title and promotion to 2014 Malaysia Super League, finishing the season unbeaten in the league. Sarawak also progressed to the quarterfinals of 2013 Malaysia FA Cup and semi-finals of 2013 Malaysia Cup. Sarawak released Bwele at the conclusion of his 2-year contract in November 2013. It is reported that Guy Bwele has sign one-year contract with KL SPA Putrajaya FC for 2014 Malaysia Premier League competition during the second window in March 2014. His first game was against the league leader Pulau Pinang and they manage to hold a draw 0–0 result to surprise many.

== International career ==
It was reported that Bwele had played six matches with the Cameroon, which two of the caps are official for his national team.

== Controversy ==
In July 2007, there was another footballer from Cameroon with the same name who was playing for the Greek team, Ergotelis FC, officially named Guy Bwelle which was 28 years old that time. It was reported that Guy Bwelle had suddenly left the club. The other Guy Bwelle, was on trial with Norwegian club IK Start. This controversy immediately attracted the media shortly after the second Guy Bwelle appeared with a friendly against FC Copenhagen.

However, the second Guy Bwelle did not manage to get a contract as the Norwegian football authorities had expressed concern that he might have falsely used Bwelle's identity.

It later turned out that the second Guy Bwelle might be his cousin, and his name is different as the person who attended the trial, who was born in 1984, is officially named Guy Bwele, not Guy Bwelle.

== Honours ==
Coton Sport de Garoua

- Cameroon Premiere Division: 2008, 2010, 2011
- Cameroon Cup: 2008, 2011

Sarawak FA

- Malaysia Premier League: 2013
