= Marwan Sayedeh =

Syrian footballer (born 1986)

- Marwan Sayedeh playing for Pelita Jaya in 2009

Personal information
- Full name: Marwan Mustafa Sayedeh
- Date of birth: 5 October 1986 (age 40)
- Place of birth: Latakia, Syria
- Height: 1.72 m (5 ft 7 1/2 in)
- Position: Striker

Youth career
- Hutteen

Senior career*
| Years | Team | Apps | (Gls) |
| 2003–2008 | Hutteen | 82 | (54) |
| 2008 | Al-Taliya | 14 | (6) |
| 2008–2009 | Al-Karamah | 21 | (10) |
| 2009 | Jableh | 15 | (7) |
| 2009–2010 | Pelita Jaya | 13 | (8) |
| 2010–2011 | PSM Makassar | 32 | (17) |
| 2011–2012 | Gresik United | 30 | (12) |
| 2013–2014 | Pelita Bandung Raya | 21 | (15) |
| 2014–2015 | Sabah FA | 19 | (14) |
| Total | | 247 | (143) |
- * Club domestic league appearances and goals

Marwan Mustafa Sayedeh (Arabic: مروان سيدة; born 5 October 1986) is a Syrian footballer.

== Club career ==
Sayedeh is Syrian Premier League 2009 Champion and Syrian Cup 2009 winner with Al-Karamah. He was a part of Al-Karamah's squad in the 2009 AFC Cup.

== Honours ==
=== Club ===
Al-Karamah

- Syrian Premier League (1): 2008–09
- Syrian Cup (1): 2008–09
