= Kim Jin-yong =

South Korean footballer (born 1982)

Kim Jin-Ryong 김진용
Personal information
- Full name: Kim Jin-Ryong
- Date of birth: October 9, 1982 (age 44)
- Place of birth: Jinju, Gyeongnam, South Korea
- Height: 1.82 m (6 ft 0 in)
- Positions: Forward; centre back

Youth career
- 2000–2003: Hanyang University

Senior career*
Years	Team	Apps	(Gls)
2004–2005	Ulsan Hyundai Horang-i	33	(3)
2006–2008	Gyeongnam FC	43	(12)
2009–2011	Seongnam Ilhwa Chunma	52	(7)
2011–2013	Gangwon FC	19	(2)
2012	→ Pohang Steelers (loan)	21	(1)
2014–2015	Negeri Sembilan FA	10	(1)
2016	DRB-Hicom F.C.		
2017	Gyeongnam FC	2	(0)

International career^{‡}
2003	South Korea U-23	4	(0)
2005	South Korea	2	(0)
- * Club domestic league appearances and goals as of 30 October 2017 ‡ National team caps and goals as of 31 December 2004

Kim Jin-Ryong (Korean: 김진용) is a retired South Korean football player.

== Club career ==
=== Ulsan Hyundai Horang-i ===
He started his professional career in Ulsan Hyundai Horang-i in 2005. He played in the Hauzen Cup. He sustained a critical injury and left for K-League 2005. The team K-League Champions for 2005.

=== Gyeongnam FC ===
He contracted with Gyeongnam FC in December 2005. In the middle of 2006 season, an injury sidelined him. For the 2007 pre-season of 2007, he joined the team's winter training in Brazil. Another critical injury ended his season. In 2008 season, he returned to the pitch and performed well.

=== Seongnam Ilhwa Chunma ===
In January 2009, he moved to Seongnam Ilhwa Chunma. He was traded for Kim Dong-hyun, member of South Korea national team. Gyeongnam FC fans complained, and te team blanked his back number for 2009 season. The team were the 2010 AFC Champions League winners.

=== Gangwon FC ===
On 4 July 2011, He moved to Gangwon FC.

=== Pohang Steelers ===
On 6 January 2012, Kim joined the Pohang Steelers on a season-long loan, including an option to make the switch permanent in 2013.

== International career ==
Internationally, Kim played for the 2004 Summer Olympics qualification as a member of South Korea U-23 and the 2005 East Asian Football Championship as a member of South Korea .

On 31 July 2005, he debuted in a 2005 East Asian Football Championship match against China PR.

== Club career statistics ==
Club performance			League		Cup		League Cup		Continental		Total	
Season	Club	League	Apps	Goals	Apps	Goals	Apps	Goals	Apps	Goals	Apps	Goals
South Korea			League		KFA Cup		League Cup		Asia		Total	
2004	Ulsan Hyundai Horang-i	K-League	18	1	4	4	11	2	-		33	7
2005	Ulsan Hyundai Horang-i	K-League	15	2	0	0	12	6	-		27	8
2006	Gyeongnam FC	K-League	20	6	2	1	10	1	-		32	8
2007	Gyeongnam FC	K-League	0	0	0	0	0	0	-		0	0
2008	Gyeongnam FC	K-League	23	6	4	0	8	0	-		35	6
2009	Seongnam Ilhwa Chunma	K-League	30	5	5	1	7	2	-		42	8
2010	Seongnam Ilhwa Chunma	K-League	11	0	0	0	0	0	9	0	20	0
2011	Seongnam Ilhwa Chunma	K-League	11	2	1	0	2	0	-		14	2
2011	Gangwon FC	K-League	12	2	1	0	0	0	-		13	2
2012	Pohang Steelers	K-League	21	1								
Career total			140	24	17	6	50	11	9	0	216	41

In 2010's Asia record is including 2010 FIFA Club World Cup results.
