= S. Sivanesan =

Malaysian footballer (born 1990)

Personal information
- Full name: Sivanesan a/l Shanmugam
- Date of birth: 28 December 1990 (age 35)
- Place of birth: Selangor, Malaysia
- Height: 1.73 m (5 ft 8 in)
- Position: Forward

Team information
- Current team: Melawati

Youth career
- 2003–2007: Bukit Jalil Sports School

Senior career*
Years	Team	Apps	(Gls)
2007–2009	Harimau Muda	10	(0)
2009–2011	Harimau Muda A	10	(1)
2011	→ Felda United (loan)	4	(0)
2012	Felda United	12	(0)
2013–2015	Negeri Sembilan	43	(10)
2016	Felda United	5	(0)
2017	PKNS	5	(0)
2017–2018	Melaka United	16	(0)
2019	Penang	4	(0)
2020–	Melawati	0	(0)

International career^{‡}
2008–2012	Malaysia U-21	10	(0)
2009–2013	Malaysia U-23	4	(0)
- * Club domestic league appearances and goals as of February 13, 2020 ‡ National team caps and goals as of January 24, 2017

Sivanesan a/l Shanmugam (born 28 December 1990) is a Malaysian footballer who plays for Malaysian club Melawati in Malaysia M3 League. Sivanesan mainly plays as a forward but also can play as an attacking midfielder.

== Club career ==
=== PKNS ===
On 29 December 2016, Sivanesan signed a contract with Malaysia Super League club PKNS. He made his debut for the club in 1–3 defeat over Kelantan on 27 January 2017.

=== Melaka United ===
On 12 June 2017, during second window transfer, Sivanesan signed a contract with Melaka United for an undisclosed fee. On 22 July 2017, he made his league first appearances for Melaka United in a 0–2 defeat over Pahang at Darul Makmur Stadium.

== Career statistics ==
=== Club ===
As of 28 July 2018

Appearances and goals by club, season and competition
Club	Season	League			Cup		League Cup		Continental		Total	
Club	Season	Division	Apps	Goals	Apps	Goals	Apps	Goals	Apps	Goals	Apps	Goals
Felda United	2016	Malaysia Super League	5	0	0	0	0	0	—		5	0
Felda United	Total		5	0	0	0	0	0	0	0	5	0
PKNS	2017	Malaysia Super League	5	0	0	0	0	0	—		5	0
PKNS	Total		5	0	0	0	0	0	0	0	5	0
Melaka United	2017	Malaysia Super League	6	0	1	0	4	0	—		11	0
Melaka United	2018	Malaysia Super League	10	0	2	0	0	0	—		12	0
Melaka United	Total		16	0	3	0	4	0	0	0	23	0
Career total			0	0	0	0	0	0	0	0	0	0
