= Ogunboye Iyanu Ezekiel =

Nigerian footballer (born 1992)

Ogunboye Iyanu
Personal information
- Full name: Ogunboye Iyanu Ezekiel
- Date of birth: June 26, 1992 (age 34)
- Place of birth: Lagos, Nigeria
- Height: 1.85 m (6 ft 1 in)
- Position: Striker

Team information
- Current team: Kuala Lumpur FA
- Number: 10

Senior career*
Years	Team	Apps	(Gls)
2013	Sungai Ara F.C.		
2014	DRB-Hicom F.C.	22	(15)
2015	Kuala Lumpur FA	10	(5)
- * Club domestic league appearances and goals

Ogunboye Iyanu Ezekiel (born June 26, 1992) is a Nigerian footballer who plays as a striker for Kuala Lumpur FA in Malaysia Premier League.
