= Ivan Babić (footballer, born 1984) =

Croatian footballer

Personal information
- Full name: Ivan Babić
- Date of birth: 29 April 1984 (age 42)
- Place of birth: Zagreb, SR Croatia, SFR Yugoslavia
- Height: 1.83 m (6 ft 0 in)
- Position: Striker

Team information
- Current team: SC Schachendorf
- Number: 10

Youth career
- 2001–2003: NK Zagreb

Senior career*
Years	Team	Apps	(Gls)
2003–2004	NK Zagreb	23	(1)
2005	Inter Zaprešić	17	(0)
2006–2007	Pula 1856	39	(2)
2007	Zvezda Irkutsk	2	(0)
2008	Međimurje	11	(2)
2008–2009	Cibalia	26	(2)
2009	Croatia Sesvete	15	(0)
2010–2011	Kastrioti	44	(13)
2011–2012	Ethnikos Achna	21	(1)
2013	Sarawak FA	7	(3)
2014	Negeri Sembilan FA	8	(3)
2015–2016	DRB-Hicom	41	(28)
2017–2018	ASKÖ Oberdorf	38	(21)
2018–	SC Schachendorf	54	(51)
- * Club domestic league appearances and goals as of 3 June 2022

Ivan Babić (born 29 April 1984) is a Croatian footballer who plays in Austria for SC Schachendorf, as a striker.
