= 2015 Penang FA season =

Penang
2015 season
- President: Nazir Ariff Munshir Ariff
- Head Coach: Jacksen F. Tiago
- Stadium: Penang State Stadium
- Malaysia Premier League: 2nd (promoted)
- Malaysia FA Cup: Quarter-finals
- Malaysia Cup: Group stage
- Top goalscorer: League: Faiz Subri (9 goals); All: Faiz Subri (10 goals)
Home colours	Away colours

The 2015 season is Penang's 89th competitive season, 2nd consecutive season in the second tier of Malaysian football since promoted in 2013, and 94th year in existence as a football club. The season covers the period from 1 November 2014 to 31 December 2015.

== Squad ==
=== First-team squad ===
As of 31 December 2014

Note: Flags indicate national team as defined under FIFA eligibility rules; some limited exceptions apply. Players may hold more than one non-FIFA nationality.

No.	Pos.	Nation	Player
1	GK	(Malaysia) MAS	Sani Anuar Kamsani
2	DF	(Malaysia) MAS	Azrul Ahmad
3	MF	(Malaysia) MAS	Mafry Balang
4	DF	(Malaysia) MAS	Darwira Sazan
5	DF	(Malaysia) MAS	Farid Ramli
6	DF	(Malaysia) MAS	Mat Saiful Mohamad
7	MF	(Malaysia) MAS	Zharif Hasna
8	MF	(Malaysia) MAS	Syukur Saidin
9	FW	(Brazil) BRA	Alberto Gonçalves
10	FW	(Malaysia) MAS	Failee Ghazli
12	MF	(Malaysia) MAS	Elias Sulaiman
13	FW	(Malaysia) MAS	See Kok Luen
14	MF	(Malaysia) MAS	Faiz Subri

No.	Pos.	Nation	Player
15	FW	(Brazil) BRA	Hilton Moreira
16	MF	(Malaysia) MAS	Redzuan Nawi
17	MF	(Malaysia) MAS	Azniee Taib
18	DF	(Malaysia) MAS	Mazlizam Mohamad
19	FW	(Malaysia) MAS	Junaidi Shafiai
20	MF	(Malaysia) MAS	Rafiuddin Rodin (captain)
22	GK	(Malaysia) MAS	Khairul Amri
23	FW	(Malaysia) MAS	Yong Kuong Yong
24	MF	(Malaysia) MAS	Redzuan Suhaidi
25	GK	(Malaysia) MAS	Remezey Che Ros
27	MF	(South Korea) KOR	Lee Kil-hoon
29	DF	(Brazil) BRA	Reinaldo Lobo

== Transfers ==
=== 1st leg ===
In: Note: Flags indicate national team as defined under FIFA eligibility rules; some limited exceptions apply. Players may hold more than one non-FIFA nationality.

No.	Pos.	Nation	Player
1	GK	(Malaysia) MAS	Sani Anuar Kamsani (from Sarawak)
2	DF	(Malaysia) MAS	Azrul Ahmad (from ATM)
3	MF	(Malaysia) MAS	Mafry Balang (from Sarawak)
5	DF	(Malaysia) MAS	Farid Ramli (from Sime Darby)
8	MF	(Malaysia) MAS	Syukur Saidin (from Sime Darby)
9	FW	(Brazil) BRA	Alberto Gonçalves (from (Indonesia) Arema Cronus)
10	FW	(Malaysia) MAS	Failee Ghazli (from Sime Darby)
13	FW	(Malaysia) MAS	See Kok Luen (from Johor Darul Ta'zim II)
18	DF	(Malaysia) MAS	Mazlizam Mohamad (from Terengganu)
19	FW	(Malaysia) MAS	Junaidi Shafiai (from Penang FA Reserves)
24	MF	(Malaysia) MAS	Redzuan Suhaidi (from Penang FA Reserves)
25	GK	(Malaysia) MAS	Remezey Che Ros (from PKNS)
29	DF	(Brazil) BRA	Reinaldo Lobo (from (Indonesia) Mitra Kukar)
–	GK	(Malaysia) MAS	Amirul Asyraf (from UiTM)
16	MF	(Malaysia) MAS	Redzuan Nawi (from Sabah)
14	MF	(Malaysia) MAS	Faiz Subri (from Terengganu)
–	MF	(Malaysia) MAS	Som Keat a/l Preseart (from Felda United)
15	MF	(Brazil) BRA	Hilton Moreira (from (Indonesia) Persib Bandung)

Out: Note: Flags indicate national team as defined under FIFA eligibility rules; some limited exceptions apply. Players may hold more than one non-FIFA nationality.

No.	Pos.	Nation	Player
–	GK	(Malaysia) MAS	G. Jeevananthan (to PKNS)
–	GK	(Malaysia) MAS	Amir Omar Khata (to Megah Murni)
–	DF	(Malaysia) MAS	Ismail Suboh (unattached)
–	DF	(Malaysia) MAS	Suhaidi Akmal Mohd Noor (to unattached)
–	DF	(Malaysia) MAS	Syafiq Azri (to Melaka United)
–	DF	(Malaysia) MAS	Hariri Mohd Safii (unattached)
–	DF	(Malaysia) MAS	Fakhrul Radzi Yaakob (to PBAPP)
–	DF	(Malaysia) MAS	Kamarul Hesam Kadri (to Felcra)
–	DF	(Malaysia) MAS	Shaik Awish Alkirani (to Real Mulia)
–	DF	(Malaysia) MAS	A. Varathan (to Sarawak)
–	DF	(Malaysia) MAS	Lew Han Hung (to Kedah)
–	DF	(South Korea) KOR	Lee Kwang-hyun (to Kuantan)
–	MF	(Malaysia) MAS	Khairan Eroza (retired)
–	MF	(Malaysia) MAS	Shazuan Ashraf (to Kedah)
–	MF	(Malaysia) MAS	G. Mahathevan (to Sarawak)
–	MF	(Malaysia) MAS	Azizan Baba (to Malacca)
–	MF	(Malaysia) MAS	Ruzaini Jamaluddin (to Sungai Ara)
–	FW	(Malaysia) MAS	Norizam Salaman (to AirAsia)
–	FW	(Malaysia) MAS	Muhamad Zamri Chin (unattached)
–	FW	(Malaysia) MAS	Baser Napae (to PBAPP)
–	FW	(Brazil) BRA	Luiz Ricardo Lino Dos Santos (to (Brazil) Guarani)
–	FW	(Angola) ANG	Titi Buengo (retired)

== Competitions ==
=== Malaysia Premier League ===
==== League table ====
Pos	Team	Pld	W	D	L	GF	GA	GD	Pts	Promotion, qualification or relegation
1	Kedah (C, P)	22	14	6	2	47	26	+21	48	Promotion to Super League
2	Penang (P)	22	13	6	3	39	18	+21	45	Promotion to Super League
3	(Terengganu) T-Team (O, P)	22	12	6	4	50	27	+23	42	Qualification to Promotion play-off
4	(Selangor) PKNS	22	11	8	3	41	22	+19	41	
5	Johor Darul Ta'zim II	22	10	4	8	37	32	+5	34	

Source: FAM Official Site, Astro Arena
Rules for classification: 1) Points; 2) Goal difference; 3) Number of goals scored
(C) Champions; (O) Play-off winners; (P) Promoted
