= 2017 Penang FA season =

Penang
2017 season
- President: Zairil Khir Johari (until 9 October); Gary Nair (interim, from 9 October)
- Head Coach: Ashley Westwood (until 19 March); Darren Read (interim, 20 March until 23 March); Zainal Abidin Hassan (from 24 March)
- Stadium: Penang State Stadium
- Malaysia Super League: 12th (relegated)
- Malaysia FA Cup: Third round
- Malaysia Cup: DNQ
- Top goalscorer: League: Nigel Dabinyaba and Sanna Nyassi (3); All: Nigel Dabinyaba (4)
- Highest home attendance: 18,545 vs Kedah (22 July 2016)
- Lowest home attendance: 603 vs T-Team (20 September 2017)
- Average home league attendance: 4,732
Home colours	Away colours

The 2017 season is Penang's 91st competitive season, 2nd consecutive season in the top flight of Malaysian football, and 96th year in existence as a football club. The season covers the period from 1 November 2016 to 31 October 2017.

== Month by month review ==
=== November 2016 ===
On 28 November, Ashley Westwood was unveiled as the new head coach of Penang, signing a two-year contract. On 30 November, Penang received RM 4 millions allocation from the state government.

=== December 2016 ===
On 1 December, Penang confirmed that Legea will be the official kit manufacturer for three years from 2017. On 5 December, Penang announced it had retained 16 players from last season. On 22 December, it was announced that on the FA Cup second round, Penang will play at away against MPKB-BRI U-BeS. On 30 December, it was announced that on the opening day, Penang will kick-off the season at away against Selangor.

=== January ===
Penang won its first pre-season match, against Felcra FC, which ended in a 2–0 victory. In the following match four days later, Penang won 2–1 against PDRM. On 9 January, Faiz Subri won the 2016 FIFA Puskás Award, becoming the first Asian to win the award. On 13 January, Penang confirmed the signings of Amirul Asyraf Suhaidi, K. Reuben, Yong Kuong Yong, Zulkhairi Zulkeply, Shazalee Ramlee, Nigel Dabinyaba, Diogo Ferreira and Andy Russell. Penang concluded its pre-season campaign with a 0–1 defeat to Nagaworld FC from Cambodia on the same day. On 18 January, Penang completed the signings of Syed Adney and G. Mahathevan, while Elias Sulaiman and Darwira Sazan were released. Penang lost 0–2 in their opening match against Selangor on 21 January at Selayang. On 27 January, Penang lost again in the league campaign against Perak.

=== February ===
Penang recorded their third and fourth consecutive loss as they lost 0–1 to T-Team at away on 4 February and Sarawak at home on 11 February. Three days later, Penang finally scored the first goal of the season in the FA Cup match against MPKB-BRI U-BeS which was also the first victory of the season. The Panthers failed to arrest their four-match defeat and goalless streaks in the league as they were demolished by Pahang at away with the score 1–6. FIFA Puskas Award winner Faiz Subri ended his year-long goal drought but could not prevent Penang from going down 3–1 to Super League leaders Kedah in Alor Star on 25 February.

=== March ===
Penang picked up their first point of the season after coming from behind to hold Melaka United to a 1–1 draw at the State Stadium on 1 March. 3 days later, Penang recorded another 1–1 draw in Shah Alam against PKNS FC. On 11 March, Penang was knocked out from the FA Cup campaign, losing 1–4 to Negeri Sembilan after extra time in Paroi. The management board mutually terminated the contract of their coach, Ashley Westwood, following a spate of poor results in the M-League. On 24 March, Zainal Abidin Hassan was unveiled as Penang's head coach to replace the former.

=== April ===
After nine attempts, Penang finally achieved their first league victory of the season after defeating Felda United 1–0 at Tun Abdul Razak Stadium on 9 April. However, the panthers failed to continue the momentum, losing 1–5 to Kelantan at home 6 days later. Penang confirmed their absence from the Malaysia Cup for the second consecutive seasons as they lost 1–2 to Johor Darul Ta'zim at home on 26 April.

=== May ===
Despite Nigel Dabinyaba's fourth goal of the season, Penang moved closer to the drop after a 2–1 home defeat to Felda United on 7 May. 8 days later, Penang re-signed Darwira Sazan and Elias Sulaiman, Andy Russell and Diogo Ferreira were released on the same day. On 18 May, Penang confirmed the signings of Azidan Sarudin and R. Surendran from Kuala Lumpur and free Agent respectively. On the next day, former Gambia international, Sanna Nyassi signed with the team. New signing, Nyassi scored a brace in his debut with Penang against Kelantan which ended 2–2 on 24 May.

=== June ===
On 7 June, Penang completed the sixth transfer of the summer transfer window, signing former Sarawak's striker, Mark Hartmann. On the next day, Brandon McDonald signed with Penang, replacing Reinaldo Lobo who is injured.

=== July ===
Penang continued the losing streak, losing 0–2 to the Super League defending champion, Johor Darul Ta'zim at Johor Bahru on 1 July.

=== September ===
On 20 September 2017, Penang has been relegated to second-tier Malaysia Premier League next year. The club's fate has been sealed following the 2–0 home defeat to T-Team.

== Coaching staff ==
Position	Name
Head coach	(Malaysia) Zainal Abidin Hassan
Assistant coach	(England) Darren Read
Goalkeeping coach	(Malaysia) Lim Chuan Chin
Fitness coach	(India) Noel Augustine
Medical Officer	(Malaysia) K. Mathialagan
Physiotherapist	(England) Samuel Coleman
Kit Man	(Malaysia) Reza Irwan Khairuddin
Kit Man	(Malaysia) Mohd Fadzly Ahmad
U-21 Team Head Coach	(Malaysia) Manzoor Azwira Abdul Wahid
U-19 Team Head Coach	(Malaysia) Noraffendi Taib

== Squad ==
As of 7 June 2017

Squad No.	Name	Nationality	Position(s)	Date of birth (age)
Goalkeepers
1	Syed Adney Syed Hussein	(Malaysia)	GK	29 November 1986 (age 39)
22	Sani Anuar Kamsani	(Malaysia)	GK	5 April 1983 (age 43)
25	Amirul Asyraf Suhaidi	(Malaysia)	GK	4 March 1994 (age 32)
40	Adam Zairi Fitri Zaini U21	(Malaysia)	GK	30 January 1998 (age 28)
Defenders
2	Mafry Balang	(Malaysia)	RB / CB / LB / DM	26 March 1984 (age 42)
3	Darwira Sazan	(Malaysia)	CB	11 August 1988 (age 38)
4	Brandon McDonald FP	(Guam)	RB / CB / DM	16 January 1986 (age 40)
6	Yong Kuong Yong	(Malaysia)	RB / CB / LB / CM / RW / CF	18 September 1988 (age 38)
18	Zulkhairi Zulkeply	(Malaysia)	RB / CB / LB	2 May 1995 (age 31)
19	Mohd Redzuan Suhaidi	(Malaysia)	CB / LB / DM	6 October 1995 (age 31)
26	Abdul Qayyum	(Malaysia)	CB	14 August 1995 (age 31)
27	K. Reuben	(Malaysia)	RB / CB / DM	2 April 1990 (age 36)
30	G. Mahathevan	(Malaysia)	CB / DM	31 May 1988 (age 38)
—	Reinaldo Lobo NR	(Brazil)	CB / DM	5 April 1988 (age 38)
Midfielders
5	Azidan Sarudin	(Malaysia)	CM	31 May 1986 (age 40)
8	Mohd Syukur Saidin	(Malaysia)	DM / CM	12 November 1991 (age 35)
11	Mohd Azrul Ahmad	(Malaysia)	DM / CM / RB / RW / CF	25 March 1985 (age 41)
15	Shazalee Ramlee	(Malaysia)	DM / CM	2 July 1994 (age 32)
20	Rafiuddin Rodin (Captain)	(Malaysia)	CM / LB / LW	22 August 1989 (age 37)
29	Elias Sulaiman	(Malaysia)	CM / AM / LW / CF	29 April 1986 (age 40)
35	Thivandaran a/l Karnan U21	(Malaysia)	LW/LM	1999
36	Khairul Akmal Rokisham U21	(Malaysia)	DM/CM	28 May 1998 (age 28)
37	Mohamad Norfais Johari U21	(Malaysia)	AM/ CM	27 March 1999 (age 27)
Strikers
7	Jafri Firdaus Chew U21	(Malaysia)	RW / LW / AM / CF	11 June 1997 (age 29)
9	Mark Hartmann FP	(Philippines)	CF	20 January 1992 (age 34)
10	Nigel Dabinyaba FP	(Papua New Guinea)	RW / CF	26 October 1992 (age 34)
12	S. Kumaahran U21	(Malaysia)	RW / LW / CF	3 July 1996 (age 30)
13	Mohd Faiz Subri	(Malaysia)	LW / CF	8 November 1987 (age 39)
14	Syamer Kutty Abba U21	(Malaysia)	RW / LW / CF	1 October 1997 (age 29)
16	Sanna Nyassi	(The Gambia)	RW / LW / AM / CF	31 January 1989 (age 37)
17	Faizat Ghazli	(Malaysia)	RW / LW / AM / CF	28 November 1994 (age 31)
21	Failee Ghazli	(Malaysia)	RW / CF	5 September 1987 (age 39)
23	R. Surendran	(Malaysia)	AM / CF	26 October 1982 (age 44)

- FP = Foreign player
- U21 = Under-21 player
- NR = Not registered

== Transfers ==
=== In ===
Winter:

Date	Pos	Player	Transferred From	Source
13 January 2017	FW	(Papua New Guinea) Nigel Dabinyaba	(New Zealand) Canterbury United FC	
13 January 2017	DF	(Malaysia) K. Reuben	(Malaysia) Kuala Lumpur FA	
13 January 2017	DF	(Malaysia) Yong Kuong Yong	(Malaysia) Terengganu FA	
13 January 2017	MF	(Malaysia) Shazalee Ramlee	(Malaysia) Kuantan FA	
13 January 2017	DF	(Malaysia) Zulkhairi Zulkeply	(Malaysia) UiTM F.C.	
13 January 2017	GK	(Malaysia) Amirul Asyraf Suhaidi	(Malaysia) UiTM F.C.	
13 January 2017	MF	(Australia) Diogo Ferreira	(Indonesia) Persib Bandung	
13 January 2017	DF	(Hong Kong) Andrew James Russell	(Hong Kong) South China AA	
18 Jan 2017	DF	(Malaysia) G. Mahathevan	(Malaysia) Megah Murni F.C.	
18 Jan 2017	GK	(Malaysia) Syed Adney Syed Hussein	(Malaysia) T-Team F.C.	

Summer:

Date	Pos	Player	Transferred From	Source
15 May 2017	DF	(Malaysia) Darwira Sazan	Free agent	
15 May 2017	MF	(Malaysia) Elias Sulaiman	Free agent	
18 May 2017	MF	(Malaysia) Azidan Sarudin	Kuala Lumpur	
18 May 2017	FW	(Malaysia) R. Surendran	Free agent	
19 May 2017	FW	(The Gambia) Sanna Nyassi	Free agent	
7 June 2017	FW	(Philippines) Mark Hartmann	Free agent	
8 June 2017	DF	(Guam) Brandon McDonald	(Guam) Rovers FC	

=== Out ===
Winter:

Date	Pos	Player	Transferred To	Source
1 December 2016	DF	(Malaysia) Mohd Fitri Omar	(Malaysia) Kedah	
1 December 2016	DF	(Malaysia) Mazlizam Mohamad	(Malaysia) Perlis	
1 December 2016	DF	(Malaysia) Mohd Farisham Ismail	(Malaysia) Kelantan	loan return
1 December 2016	DF	(Malaysia) Mat Saiful Mohamad	Retired	
1 December 2016	MF	(South Korea) Jeong Seok-min	Released	
1 December 2016	MF	(Malaysia) Mohd Redzuan Nawi	(Malaysia) MISC-MIFA	
1 December 2016	MF	(Malaysia) Mohd Zharif bin Hasna	Released	
1 December 2016	MF	(Malaysia) Ikhmal Ibrahim	(Malaysia) Sime Darby F.C.	
1 December 2016	MF	(Argentina) Matias Córdoba	(Indonesia) PS Barito Putera	
1 December 2016	MF	(Malaysia) Mohd Fauzan Dzulkifli	(Malaysia) PKNS FC	
1 December 2016	MF	(Malaysia) Muhd Nursalam Zainal Abidin	(Malaysia) UiTM FC	
1 December 2016	FW	(Nigeria) Ranti Martins	(United States) SGFC Eagles Maryland	
1 December 2016	GK	(Malaysia) Khairul Amri Salehuddin	(Malaysia) Perak	
1 December 2016	GK	(Malaysia) Mohd Firdaus Muhamad	(Malaysia) Melaka United	
19 January 2017	MF	(Malaysia) Elias Sulaiman	Released	
19 January 2017	DF	(Malaysia) Darwira Sazan	Released	

Summer:

Date	Pos	Player	Transferred To	Source
15 May 2017	DF	(Hong Kong) Andrew James Russell	(Hong Kong) Tai Po FC	
15 May 2017	MF	(Australia) Diogo Ferreira	(India) Mohun Bagan AC	

== Pre-season ==
6 January 2017 Friendly	Penang (Malaysia)	2–1	(Malaysia) Felcra F.C.	George Town, Penang
17:30 UTC+8	Dabinyaba 18' (pen.); Elias 72'		62'	Stadium: City Stadium

10 January 2017 Friendly	Penang (Malaysia)	2–1	(Malaysia) PDRM	George Town, Penang
17:30 UTC+8	Dabinyaba 5'; Lobo 10' (pen.)		76'	Stadium: City Stadium

13 January 2017 Friendly	Penang (Malaysia)	0–1	(Cambodia) Nagaworld FC	George Town, Penang
21:00 UTC+8			Diego 15'	Stadium: City Stadium

== Competitions ==
=== Overview ===
Competition	Record							
Competition	G	W	D	L	GF	GA	GD	Win %
Super League	22	3	3	16	16	43	−27	13.64
FA Cup	2	1	0	1	2	4	−2	50.00
Total	24	4	3	17	18	47	−29	16.67

Updated to match played 28 October 2017
Source: Competitions

=== Super League ===
==== League table ====
Pos	Team	Pld	W	D	L	GF	GA	GD	Pts	Qualification or relegation
8	Melaka United	22	6	6	10	33	46	−13	24	
9	T–Team (R)	22	7	5	10	30	45	−15	23 (Note: Kelantan and T–Team was sentenced to a six-point deduction immediately on offense failed to complete the registration process Malaysian League (M-League) 2017. Later, upon careful consideration of the aforementioned appeals, Football Malaysia have decided to lift the transfer ban and reduce the deduction of 6 points to 3 points for T-Team.)	Relegation to Premier League
10	Kelantan	22	7	4	11	31	39	−8	22 (Note: Kelantan and T–Team was sentenced to a six-point deduction immediately on offense failed to complete the registration process Malaysian League (M-League) 2017. Later, upon careful consideration of the aforementioned appeals, Football Malaysia have decided to only reduce the deduction of 6 points to 3 points for Kelantan.)	
11	Sarawak (R)	22	5	6	11	24	34	−10	21	Relegation to Premier League
12	Penang (R)	22	3	3	16	16	43	−27	12	Relegation to Premier League

Source: FAM, FMLLP
Rules for classification: 1) Points; 2) Goal difference; 3) Number of goals scored.
(R) Relegated

==== Results summary ====
Overall								Home						Away					
Pld	W	D	L	GF	GA	GD	Pts	W	D	L	GF	GA	GD	W	D	L	GF	GA	GD
22	3	3	16	16	43	−27	12	1	1	9	7	21	−14	2	2	7	9	22	−13

Last updated: 28 October 2017.
Source: Competitions

==== Matches ====
Win Draw Loss

21 January 2017 1	Selangor	2–0	Penang	Selayang, Selangor
21:00 UTC+8	Adam Nor 35'; Francis Doe 45'	Report		Stadium: Selayang Stadium; Attendance: 3,076; Referee: Fitri Maskon (Melaka)

27 January 2017 2	Penang	0–1	Perak	Batu Kawan, Penang
21:00 UTC+8		Report	Shahrul 78'	Stadium: Penang State Stadium; Attendance: ≈9,000; Referee: Zamzaidi Katimin (Melaka)

4 February 2017 3	T-Team (Terengganu)	1–0	Penang	Kuala Terengganu, Terengganu
21:00 UTC+8	Samassa 71'	Report		Stadium: Sultan Ismail Nasiruddin Shah Stadium; Attendance: 821; Referee: Suhaizi Shukri (Melaka)

11 February 2017 4	Penang	0–1	Sarawak	Batu Kawan, Penang
21:00 UTC+8		Report	Hartmann 72'	Stadium: Penang State Stadium; Attendance: 4,946; Referee: Nagor Amir Noor Mohamed (Kuala Lumpur)

18 February 2017 5	Pahang	6–1	Penang	Kuantan, Pahang
21:00 UTC+8	Sumareh 16'; Zaharulnizam 25'; Joseph 66'; Alves 73'; Ashari 85', 86'	Report	Dabinyaba 31'	Stadium: Darul Makmur Stadium; Attendance: 9,654; Referee: Zulkifli Ahmad (Kuala Lumpur)

25 February 2017 6	Kedah	3–1	Penang	Alor Setar, Kedah
21:00 UTC+8	Fitri 21'; Syafiq 75'; Liridon 86'	Report	Faiz 19'	Stadium: Darul Aman Stadium; Attendance: 25,000; Referee: Nagor Amir Noor Mohamed (Kuala Lumpur)

1 March 2017 7	Penang	1–1	(Malacca) Melaka United	Batu Kawan, Penang
21:00 UTC+8	Reinaldo 88'	Report	A. Khuzaimi 6'	Stadium: Penang State Stadium; Attendance: 1,288; Referee: Mohd Amirul Izwan Yaacob (Perak)

4 March 2017 8	PKNS (Selangor)	1–1	Penang	Shah Alam, Selangor
16:45 UTC+8	Ronaldinho 28'	Report	Dabinyaba 53'	Stadium: Shah Alam Stadium; Attendance: 281; Referee: Zulkarnain Zakaria (Kuala Lumpur)

9 April 2017 9	Felda United (Kuala Lumpur)	0–1	Penang	Jengka, Pahang
21:00 UTC+8		Report	Kumaahran 78'	Stadium: Tun Abdul Razak Stadium; Attendance: 1,130; Referee: Nagor Amir Noor Mohamed (Kuala Lumpur)

15 April 2017 10	Penang	1−5	Kelantan	Penang
21:00 UTC+8	Syukur 35'	Report	Ghaddar 19' (pen.), 22', 25', 57', 78'; Danial Ashraf 90'	Stadium: Penang State Stadium; Attendance: 8,130; Referee: Zulkarnain Zakaria (Kuala Lumpur)

27 April 2017 11	Penang	1–2	Johor Darul Ta'zim	Batu Kawan, Penang
21:00 UTC+8	Rafiuddin 39' (pen.)	Report	Cabrera 6'; Azamuddin 24'	Stadium: Penang State Stadium; Attendance: 3,091; Referee: Mohd Amirul Izwan Yaacob (Perak)

7 May 2017 12	Penang	1–2	(Kuala Lumpur) Felda United	Batu Kawan, Penang
21:00 UTC+8	Dabinyaba 54'	Report	Cano 17'; Norshahrul I. 89'	Stadium: Penang State Stadium; Attendance: 1,393; Referee: Mohd Fairuzi Mat Desa (Perak)

24 May 2017 13	Kelantan	2–2	Penang	Kota Bharu, Kelantan
21:00 UTC+8	Thinagaran 27'; Danial Ashraf 55'	Report	Nyassi 24', 89'	Stadium: Sultan Muhammad IV Stadium; Attendance: 8,924; Referee: Mohd Amirul Izwan Yaacob (Perak)

1 July 2017 14	Johor Darul Ta'zim	2–0	Penang	Johor Bahru, Johor
21:00 UTC+8	Ghaddar 44'; Cabrera 83'	Report		Stadium: Tan Sri Dato Haji Hassan Yunos Stadium; Attendance: 16,850; Referee: Razlan Jeffri Ali (Selangor)

11 July 2017 15	Penang	0–2	(Selangor) PKNS	Batu Kawan, Penang
21:00 UTC+8		Report	Ronaldinho 53'; Jammeh 80'	Stadium: Penang State Stadium; Attendance: 2,173; Referee: Mohd Amirul Izwan Yaacob (Perak)

15 July 2017 16	Melaka United (Malacca)	2–3	Penang	Malacca City, Malacca
21:00 UTC+8	Šimić 36' (pen.), 89' (pen.)	Report	Mohd Faiz Subri 5'; Hartmann 54'; Kumaahran 61'	Stadium: Hang Jebat Stadium; Attendance: 4,004; Referee: Nafeez Wahab (Johor)

22 July 2017 17	Penang	0–2	Kedah	Batu Kawan, Penang
21:00 UTC+8		Report	Ilsø 62'; Baddrol 74'	Stadium: Penang State Stadium; Attendance: 18,545; Referee: Mohd Amirul Izwan Yaacob (Perak)

26 July 2017 18	Penang	2–0	Pahang	Batu Kawan, Penang
21:00 UTC+8	Hartmann 8'; Nyassi 65'	Report		Stadium: Penang State Stadium; Attendance: 2,158; Referee: Suresh Jayaraman (Selangor)

5 August 2017 19	Sarawak	2–0	Penang	Kuching, Sarawak
20:15 UTC+8	Alif 51'; Kamaruddin 72'	Report		Stadium: Sarawak State Stadium; Attendance: 1,214; Referee: Wan Mohd Tarmizi Wan Ibrahim (Selangor)

20 September 2017 20	Penang	0–2	(Terengganu) T-Team	Batu Kawan, Penang
21:00 UTC+8		Report	Fauzi 28'; Asrol 58'	Stadium: Penang State Stadium; Attendance: 603; Referee: Zulkarnain Zakaria (Kuala Lumpur)

27 September 2017 21	Perak	1–0	Penang	Ipoh, Perak
21:00 UTC+08:00	Nizad 25'	Report		Stadium: Perak Stadium; Attendance: 1,412; Referee: Fitri Maskon (Johor)

28 October 2017 22	Penang	1–3	Selangor	Seberang Perai, Penang
21:00 UTC+08:00	Jafri 48'	Report	Andik 25'; Rufino 50', 62'; Tamil (yellow card) 74'; Kannan (yellow card) 90+2'	Stadium: Penang State Stadium; Attendance: 728; Referee: Fitri Maskon (Johor)

=== FA Cup ===
Win Draw Loss

14 February 2017 Second round	MPKB-BRI U-Bes (Kelantan)	0–1	Penang	Kota Bharu, Kelantan
21:00 UTC+8		Report	Dabinyaba 40'	Stadium: Sultan Mohammad IV Stadium; Attendance: 3,267; Referee: Samsudin Ibrahim (Terengganu)

11 March 2017 Third round	Negeri Sembilan	4–1 (a.e.t.)	Penang	Seremban, Negeri Sembilan
21:00 UTC+8	Šimić 45'; Lee Tuck 107', 112', 120'	Report	48' Reinaldo	Stadium: Tuanku Abdul Rahman Stadium; Attendance: 16,502; Referee: Zulkifli Ahmad (Kuala Lumpur)

== Statistics ==
=== Squad statistics ===
N	Pos	Nat.	Player	Super League		FA Cup		Malaysia Cup		Total	
N	Pos	Nat.	Player	Apps	Goals	Apps	Goals	Apps	Goals	Apps	Goals
1	GK	(Malaysia)	Syed Adney	7	–	1	–	–	–	8	–
2	DF	(Malaysia)	Mafry Balang	18	–	1	–	–	–	19	–
3	DF	(Malaysia)	Darwira Sazan	—	–	–	–	–	–	—	–
4	DF	(Guam)	Brandon McDonald	8	–	–	–	–	–	8	–
5	MF	(Malaysia)	Azidan Sarudin	5(4)	–	–	–	–	–	5(4)	–
6	DF	(Malaysia)	Yong Kuong Yong	7(2)	–	–	–	–	–	7(2)	–
7	FW	(Malaysia)	Jafri Chew	7(5)	1	–	–	–	–	7(5)	1
8	MF	(Malaysia)	Syukur Saidin	5(3)	1	2	–	–	–	7(3)	1
9	FW	(Philippines)	Mark Hartmann	7(1)	2	–	–	–	–	7(1)	2
10	FW	(Papua New Guinea)	Nigel Dabinyaba	16(1)	3	2	1	–	–	18(1)	4
11	MF	(Malaysia)	Mohd Azrul Ahmad	12(4)	–	–	–	–	–	12(4)	–
12	FW	(Malaysia)	S. Kumaahran	16(2)	2	2	–	–	–	18(2)	2
13	FW	(Malaysia)	Mohd Faiz Subri	10(10)	2	1(1)	–	–	–	11(11)	2
14	FW	(Malaysia)	Syamer Kutty Abba	20(1)	–	1(1)	–	–	–	21(2)	–
15	MF	(Malaysia)	Shazalee Ramlee	0(1)	–	–	–	–	–	0(1)	–
16	FW	(The Gambia)	Sanna Nyassi	8	3	–	–	–	–	8	3
17	FW	(Malaysia)	Faizat Ghazli	12(4)	–	2	–	–	–	14(4)	–
18	DF	(Malaysia)	Zulkhairi Zulkeply	9(3)	–	0(1)	–	–	–	9(4)	–
19	DF	(Malaysia)	Redzuan Suhaidi	4(5)	–	–	–	–	–	4(5)	–
20	MF	(Malaysia)	Rafiuddin Rodin	13(1)	1	1	–	–	–	14(1)	1
21	FW	(Malaysia)	Failee Ghazli	1(2)	–	–	–	–	–	1(2)	–
22	GK	(Malaysia)	Sani Anuar Kamsani	8(1)	–	1	–	–	–	9(1)	–
23	FW	(Malaysia)	R. Surendran	0(3)	–	–	–	–	–	0(3)	–
25	GK	(Malaysia)	Amirul Asyraf	7(1)	–	–	–	–	–	7(1)	–
26	DF	(Malaysia)	Abdul Qayyum	—	–	–	–	–	–	–	–
27	DF	(Malaysia)	K. Reuben	12(2)	–	2	–	–	–	14(2)	–
30	DF	(Malaysia)	G. Mahathevan	3	–	1	–	–	–	4	–
35	MF	(Malaysia)	S. Thivandaran	–	–	–	–	–	–	–	–
36	MF	(Malaysia)	Khairul Akmal Rokisham	3(3)	–	–	–	–	–	3(3)	–
37	MF	(Malaysia)	Nurfais Johari	–	–	–	–	–	–	–	–
40	GK	(Malaysia)	Adam Zairi Fitri	–	–	–	–	–	–	–	–
–	DF	(Brazil)	Reinaldo Lobo	9	1	2	1	–	–	11	2
Players who left the club in May transfer window or on loan
5	MF	(Australia)	D. Ferreira	7	–	1	–	–	–	8	–
23	DF	(Hong Kong)	Andy Russell	8	–	2	–	–	–	10	–

Last updated: 28 October 2017.
Source: Competitions

=== Goalscorers ===
The list is sorted by shirt number when total goals are equal.

Rnk	Pos	No.	Player	Super League	FA Cup	Malaysia Cup	Total
1	FW	10	(Papua New Guinea) Nigel Dabinyaba	3	1	–	4
2	FW	16	(The Gambia) Sanna Nyassi	3	0	–	3
3	DF	4	(Brazil) Reinaldo Lobo	1	1	–	2
3	FW	9	(Philippines) Mark Hartmann	2	0	–	2
3	FW	12	(Malaysia) S. Kumaahran	2	0	–	2
3	FW	13	(Malaysia) Mohd Faiz Subri	2	0	–	2
7	FW	7	(Malaysia) Jafri Chew	1	0	–	1
7	MF	8	(Malaysia) Mohd Syukur Saidin	1	0	–	1
7	DF	20	(Malaysia) Rafiuddin Rodin	1	0	–	1
Own goal				0	0	–	1
Total				16	2	–	18

Last updated: 28 October 2017.
Source: Competitions

=== Clean sheets ===
The list is sorted by shirt number when total clean sheets are equal.

Rnk	No.	Player	Super League	FA Cup	Malaysia Cup	Total
1	22	(Malaysia) Sani Anuar	1	1	–	2
2	25	(Malaysia) Amirul Asyraf	1	0	–	1
3	1	(Malaysia) Syed Adney	0	0	–	0
Total			2	1	–	3

Last updated: 28 October 2017.
Source: Competitions

=== Disciplinary record ===
N	P	Nat.	Name	Super League			FA Cup			Malaysia Cup			Total			Notes
N	P	Nat.	Name	Yellow card	Second yellow card	Red card	Yellow card	Second yellow card	Red card	Yellow card	Second yellow card	Red card	Yellow card	Second yellow card	Red card	Notes
11	MF	(Malaysia)	Mohd Azrul Ahmad	3		1							3		1	
2	MF	(Malaysia)	Mafry Balang	1		1							1		1	
20	DF	(Malaysia)	Rafiuddin Rodin	3			1						4			
14	FW	(Malaysia)	Syamer Kutty Abba	3									3			
17	FW	(Malaysia)	Faizat Ghazli	2			1						3			
18	DF	(Malaysia)	Zulkhairi Zulkeply	3									3			
5	MF	(Australia)	D. Ferreira	2									2			
7	FW	(Malaysia)	Jafri Chew	2									2			
27	MF	(Malaysia)	K. Reuben	2									2			
5	MF	(Malaysia)	Azidan Sarudin	1									1			
8	MF	(Malaysia)	Syukur Saidin	1									1			
10	FW	(Papua New Guinea)	Nigel Dabinyaba	1									1			
12	FW	(Malaysia)	S. Kumaahran	1									1			
16	FW	(The Gambia)	Sanna Nyassi	1									1			

Last updated: 28 October 2017.
Source: Matches
Only competitive matches
(yellow card) = Number of bookings; (second yellow card) = Number of sending offs after a second yellow card; (red card) = Number of sending offs by a direct red card.

- 1 point and 3 points are allocated to each yellow card and red card respectively for ranking purposes.

=== Summary ===
Games played	24 (22 Super League, 2 FA Cup)
Games won	4 (3 Super League, 1 FA Cup)
Games drawn	3 (3 Super League)
Games lost	17 (16 Super League, 1 FA Cup)
Goals scored	18 (16 Super League, 2 FA Cup)
Goals conceded	47 (43 Super League, 4 FA Cup)
Goal difference	—29 (—27 Super League, —2 FA Cup)
Clean sheets	3 (2 Super League, 1 FA Cup)
Yellow cards	28 (26 Super League, 2 FA Cup)
Red cards	2 (2 Super League)
Most appearances	(Malaysia) Syamer Kutty Abba (23 Appearances)
Top scorer	(Papua New Guinea) Nigel Dabinyaba (4 goals)
Winning Percentage	Overall: 4/24 (16.66%)

Last updated: 28 October 2017.
Source: Competitions
