= 2016 Penang FA season =

Penang
2016 season
- President: Nazir Ariff Munshir Ariff
- Head Coach: Jacksen F. Tiago
- Stadium: Penang State Stadium
- Malaysia Super League: 10th
- Malaysia FA Cup: Second round
- Malaysia Cup: DNQ
- Top goalscorer: League: Mark Hartmann (5 goals); All: Mark Hartmann (5 goals)
Home colours	Away colours

The 2016 season is Penang's 90th competitive season, 1st season in the top flight of Malaysian football since promoted in 2015, and 95th year in existence as a football club. The season covers the period from 31 December 2015 to 31 October 2016.

== Squad ==
=== First-team squad ===
As of 8 February 2016

Note: Flags indicate national team as defined under FIFA eligibility rules; some limited exceptions apply. Players may hold more than one non-FIFA nationality.

No.	Pos.	Nation	Player
1	GK	(Malaysia) MAS	Firdaus Muhamad
2	MF	(Malaysia) MAS	Mafry Balang
3	DF	(Malaysia) MAS	Fitri Omar
4	DF	(Brazil) BRA	Reinaldo Lobo
5	DF	(Malaysia) MAS	Mat Saiful Mohamad
6	DF	(Australia) AUS	Brent Griffiths
7	MF	(Argentina) ARG	Matías Córdoba
8	MF	(Malaysia) MAS	Zharif Hasna
9	MF	(Malaysia) MAS	Fauzan Dzulkifli
10	FW	(Nigeria) NGA	Osas Saha
11	DF	(Malaysia) MAS	Azrul Ahmad
12	MF	(Malaysia) MAS	Elias Sulaiman
13	MF	(Malaysia) MAS	Faiz Subri
14	MF	(Malaysia) MAS	Syukur Saidin

No.	Pos.	Nation	Player
15	MF	(Malaysia) MAS	Ikhmal Ibrahim
16	DF	(Malaysia) MAS	Darwira Sazan
17	FW	(Malaysia) MAS	Faizat Ghazli
18	DF	(Malaysia) MAS	Mazlizam Mohamad
19	MF	(Malaysia) MAS	Redzuan Suhaidi
20	MF	(Malaysia) MAS	Rafiuddin Rodin (captain)
21	FW	(Malaysia) MAS	Failee Ghazli
22	GK	(Malaysia) MAS	Sani Anuar Kamsani
23	MF	(Malaysia) MAS	Redzuan Nawi
24	MF	(Malaysia) MAS	Nursalam Zainal Abidin
25	GK	(Malaysia) MAS	Khairul Amri
26	FW	(Malaysia) MAS	S. Kumaahran
27	FW	(Malaysia) MAS	Jafri Firdaus

== Transfers ==
=== 1st leg ===
In: Note: Flags indicate national team as defined under FIFA eligibility rules; some limited exceptions apply. Players may hold more than one non-FIFA nationality.

No.	Pos.	Nation	Player
1	GK	(Malaysia) MAS	Firdaus Muhamad (from Kedah)
3	DF	(Malaysia) MAS	Fitri Omar (from Kelantan)
6	DF	(Australia) AUS	Brent Griffiths (from (Australia) Central Coast Mariners)
7	MF	(Argentina) ARG	Matías Córdoba (from (El Salvador) Alianza)
9	MF	(Malaysia) MAS	Fauzan Dzulkifli (from Felda United)
10	FW	(Nigeria) NGA	Osas Saha (from (Indonesia) Sriwijaya)
15	MF	(Malaysia) MAS	Ikhmal Ibrahim (from Penang FA Reserves)
17	FW	(Malaysia) MAS	Faizat Ghazli (from Harimau Muda A)
24	MF	(Malaysia) MAS	Nursalam Zainal Abidin (from UiTM)
26	FW	(Malaysia) MAS	S. Kumaahran (from Harimau Muda A)
27	FW	(Malaysia) MAS	Jafri Firdaus (from Penang FA Reserves)

Out: Note: Flags indicate national team as defined under FIFA eligibility rules; some limited exceptions apply. Players may hold more than one non-FIFA nationality.

No.	Pos.	Nation	Player
—	MF	(South Korea) KOR	Lee Kil-hoon (to Sime Darby)
—	MF	(Malaysia) MAS	Azniee Taib (to Johor Darul Ta'zim)
—	MF	(Malaysia) MAS	See Kok Luen (to Melaka United)
—	DF	(Malaysia) MAS	Farid Ramli (to PKNS)
—	GK	(Malaysia) MAS	Remezey Che Ros (to PKNS)
—	FW	(Malaysia) MAS	Yong Kuong Yong (to Terengganu)
—	FW	(Malaysia) MAS	Junaidi Shafiai (to Penang FA Reserves)
—	FW	(Brazil) BRA	Alberto Gonçalves (to (Indonesia) Sriwijaya)
—	FW	(Brazil) BRA	Hilton Moreira (to (Indonesia) Sriwijaya)

=== 2nd leg ===
In: Note: Flags indicate national team as defined under FIFA eligibility rules; some limited exceptions apply. Players may hold more than one non-FIFA nationality.

No.	Pos.	Nation	Player
—	FW	(Nigeria) NGA	Ranti Martins (from (India) East Bengal)
—	MF	(South Korea) KOR	Jeong Seok-min (from (South Korea) Jeonnam Dragons)

Out: Note: Flags indicate national team as defined under FIFA eligibility rules; some limited exceptions apply. Players may hold more than one non-FIFA nationality.

No.	Pos.	Nation	Player
—	FW	(Nigeria) NGA	Osas Saha (to (Indonesia) Perseru Serui)
—	FW	(Australia) AUS	Brent Griffiths (to (Australia) Bayswater City)
