= 2020 Penang FA season =

Penang
2020 season
- President: Dr. Amar Pritpal Abdullah
- Head Coach: Manzoor Azwira
- Stadium: City Stadium
- Premier League: 1st (Promoted as Champions)
- FA Cup: Tournament Cancelled
- Malaysia Cup: Quarter-finals
- Top goalscorer: League: Casagrande (9 goals); All: Casagrande (10 goals)
- Highest home attendance: 5,855 vs Selangor II (7 March 2020)
- Lowest home attendance: 4,330 vs Sarawak United (1 March 2020)
- Biggest win: 4–0 (vs. Kelantan United, 2 October 2020, Premier League)
- Biggest defeat: 0–1 (vs. Terengganu II, 10 October 2020, Premier League)
Home colours	Away colours	Third colours

The 2020 season was Penang's 94th competitive season, 3rd consecutive season in the second tier of Malaysian football since relegated in 2017, and 99th year in existence as a football club. The season covers the period from 1 December 2019 to 30 November 2020. After spending the season mostly at the top of the league table, Penang were promoted to the Super League on 20 September. Two weeks later, Penang won the Malaysia Premier League for the first time in the club's history after Kuala Lumpur failed to get three points against Perak II.

== Coaching Staffs ==
Position	Name
Head Coach	(Malaysia) Manzoor Azwira
Assistant Coach	(Malaysia) Akmal Rizal Ahmad Rakhli (Malaysia) Mat Saiful Mohamad
Goalkeeping Coach	(Malaysia) Mohd Hisham Jainudin
Fitness Coach	(Malaysia) Rozy Abdul Majid (Malaysia) Faizal Halim
Team Doctor	(Malaysia) Hardeep Singh Jaginder Singh (Malaysia) Parmjit Singh Kuldip Singh
Physiotherapist	(Malaysia) Izzul Naim Jamil
Masseur	(Malaysia) K. Mathialagan
Kit Man	(Malaysia) Razif Radali (Malaysia) Sufie Noorazizan
U-21 Team Head Coach	(Malaysia) Wan Rohaimi
U-19 Team Head Coach	(Malaysia) K. Mahendran

== Squad ==
As of 2 October 2020

Squad No.	Name	Nationality	Position(s)	Date of Birth (Age)
Goalkeepers
1	Samuel Somerville	(Malaysia) (England)	GK	1 March 1994 (age 32)
21	Wong Tse Yang	(Malaysia) (Hong Kong)	GK	13 May 1995 (age 31)
22	Ramadhan Hamid	(Malaysia)	GK	16 February 1994 (age 32)
25	Hazrull Hafiz	(Malaysia)	GK	6 December 1997 (age 28)
71	Al Imran Ishak U21	(Malaysia)	GK	21 June 1999 (age 27)
Defenders
3	Raffi Nagoorgani	(Malaysia)	RB / CB	17 June 1994 (age 32)
6	Khairul Akmal	(Malaysia)	RB / CB / DM	28 May 1998 (age 28)
13	Latiff Suhaimi	(Malaysia)	CB / DM / CF	29 May 1989 (age 37)
15	Fairuz Zakaria	(Malaysia)	RB / DM	25 May 1997 (age 29)
16	Zamri Pin Ramli	(Malaysia)	RB / RW	24 April 1991 (age 35)
17	Rafael Vitor FP	(Brazil)	CB	5 January 1993 (age 33)
23	Zharif Desa	(Malaysia)	CB	8 July 1992 (age 34)
33	Azmi Muslim	(Malaysia)	LB / LW	17 October 1986 (age 40)
88	M. Yoges	(Malaysia)	LB / LW	13 November 1988 (age 37)
Midfielders
7	Syukur Saidin	(Malaysia)	DM / CM	12 November 1991 (age 35)
8	Khairu Azrin	(Malaysia)	DM / CM	13 July 1991 (age 35)
10	Lee Chang-hoon FP	(South Korea)	RW / LW	17 December 1986 (age 39)
11	Amer Azahar	(Malaysia)	RW	22 June 1995 (age 31)
12	Al-Hafiz Harun	(Malaysia)	RW	13 April 1994 (age 32)
14	Endrick FP	(Brazil)	AM / CM / CF	7 March 1995 (age 31)
20	Azrie Reza	(Malaysia)	AM	30 December 1997 (age 28)
28	Wan Faiz	(Malaysia)	AM	11 July 1992 (age 34)
55	Afif Azman	(Malaysia)	AM / RW	1 August 1998 (age 28)
62	Daniel Irfan U21	(Malaysia)	AM	7 March 2000 (age 26)
78	Azmeer Aris U21	(Malaysia)	AM	5 August 1999 (age 27)
Strikers
9	Casagrande FP	(Brazil)	CF	28 July 1986 (age 40)
18	Marcus Mah	(Malaysia)	CF	2 April 1994 (age 32)
19	Nurshamil Ghani	(Malaysia)	CF	25 September 1994 (age 32)
30	Nurfais Johari U21	(Malaysia)	AM / LW	27 March 1999 (age 27)
99	Bobby Gonzales	(Malaysia)	CF	15 February 1984 (age 42)

- FP = Foreign player
- U21 = Under-21 player

== Transfers and contracts ==
=== In ===
==== 1st Transfer Window ====
No.	Pos.	Name	Age	Moving from	Type	Transfer Date	Transfer fee
11	MF	(Malaysia) Amer Azahar	31	(Malaysia) UiTM	Transfer	9 November 2019	Free
28	MF	(Malaysia) Wan Mohd Faiz	34	(Malaysia) UKM	Transfer	9 November 2019	Free
1	GK	(Malaysia) (England) Samuel Somerville	32	(Malaysia) Johor DT II	Transfer	10 November 2019	Free
18	FW	(Malaysia) Marcus Mah	31	(Malaysia) Petaling Jaya City	Transfer	20 November 2019	Free
22	GK	(Malaysia) Ramadhan Hamid	32	(Malaysia) Kedah	Transfer	21 November 2019	Free
15	DF	(Malaysia) Fairuz Zakaria	29	(Malaysia) Kedah President Cup	Transfer	21 November 2019	Free
23	DF	(Malaysia) Zharif Desa	34	(Malaysia) Melaka United	Transfer	21 November 2019	Free
33	DF	(Malaysia) Azmi Muslim	40	(Malaysia) Kuala Lumpur	Transfer	23 November 2019	Free
20	MF	(Malaysia) Azrie Reza Zamri	28	(Malaysia) Youth System	Promotion	5 December 2019	N/A
3	DF	(Malaysia) Raffi Nagoorgani	32	(Malaysia) Felda United	Transfer	5 December 2019	Free
10	MF	(South Korea) Lee Chang-hoon	39	(Malaysia) PDRM	Transfer	5 December 2019	Free
8	MF	(Malaysia) Khairu Azrin Khazali	35	(Malaysia) Terengganu FC	Transfer	5 December 2019	Free
16	DF	(Malaysia) Zamri Pin Ramli	35	(Malaysia) Petaling Jaya City	Transfer	6 December 2019	Free
9	FW	(Brazil) Casagrande	40	(Malaysia) Melaka United	Transfer	15 December 2019	Free
13	DF	(Malaysia) Latiff Suhaimi	37	(Malaysia) Selangor	Transfer	25 December 2019	Free
14	MF	(Brazil) Endrick	31	(Malaysia) Selangor	Transfer	8 January 2020	Free
19	FW	(Malaysia) Nurshamil Abd Ghani	32	(Malaysia) Melaka United	Transfer	8 January 2020	Free
17	DF	(Brazil) Rafael Vitor	33	(Brazil) Nacional	Transfer	11 January 2020	Free
99	FW	(Malaysia) Bobby Gonzales	42	(Malaysia) Sarawak United	Transfer	7 February 2020	Free
21	GK	(Malaysia) (Hong Kong) Wong Tse Yang	31	Free Agent	Transfer	2 October 2020	Free

=== Out ===
==== 1st Transfer Window ====
No.	Pos.	Name	Age	Moving to	Type	Transfer Date	Transfer fee
1	GK	(Malaysia) Zamir Selamat	37	(Malaysia) Kuala Lumpur	Released	3 November 2019	Free
2	DF	(Malaysia) Che Safwan Hazman	30	(Malaysia) Negeri Sembilan	Released	3 November 2019	Free
3	MF	(Malaysia) Lim Yong Sheng	31	Free agent	Released	3 November 2019	Free
6	MF	(Malaysia) Wan Mohd Syukri	35	(Malaysia) Melaka United	Loan Return	3 November 2019	N/A
7	MF	(South Korea) Kang Seung-jo	40	(Malaysia) Kelantan	Released	3 November 2019	Free
8	MF	(Malaysia) Dhiyaulrahman Hasry	30	(Malaysia) Terengganu II	Released	3 November 2019	Free
9	FW	(Brazil) Casagrande	40	(Malaysia) Melaka United	Loan Return	3 November 2019	N/A
10	FW	(Argentina) Julián Bottaro	34	(Malaysia) UKM F.C.	Released	3 November 2019	Free
11	MF	(Malaysia) Mohd Azrul Ahmad	41	(Malaysia) Kelantan	Released	3 November 2019	Free
15	DF	(Malaysia) Abdul Aziz Ismail	38	(Malaysia) Kelantan United	Released	3 November 2019	Free
16	FW	(Argentina) Ezequiel Agüero	32	(Malaysia) Kuala Lumpur Rovers	Released	3 November 2019	Free
17	DF	(Malaysia) Tunku Noor Hidayat	31	Free agent	Released	3 November 2019	Free
18	FW	(Malaysia) Rahizi Rasib	32	(Malaysia) Protap	Released	3 November 2019	Free
19	MF	(Malaysia) S. Sivanesan	35	(Malaysia) Melawati	Released	3 November 2019	Free
22	GK	(Malaysia) Faizal Yusoff	39	Free agent	Released	3 November 2019	Free
23	MF	(Malaysia) Ikhmal Ibrahim	32	Free agent	Released	3 November 2019	Free
26	DF	(Malaysia) A. Segar	33	(Malaysia) KSR Sains	Released	3 November 2019	Free
29	FW	(Malaysia) Mohd Afiq Azmi	37	Free agent	Released	3 November 2019	Free
	MF	(Malaysia) Mohd Redzuan Suhaidi	31	(Malaysia) Langkawi City	Released	3 November 2019	Free
	DF	(Malaysia) Amir Qayyum Zulkipli	30	Free agent	Released	3 November 2019	Free
	MF	(Malaysia) Amirul Syazani Roslan	32	Free agent	Released	3 November 2019	Free
	DF	(Malaysia) Som Keat Preseart	30	(Malaysia) Thai Selangor	Released	3 November 2019	Free
	MF	(Malaysia) Faizzudin Abidin	23	(Malaysia) Selangor	Loan return	15 November 2019	N/A
	DF	(Malaysia) Abdul Qayyum	24	(Malaysia) Sarawak United	Released	29 February 2020	Free

== Friendlies ==
26 November 2019 Friendly	Puchong Fuerza	2–3	Penang	Bangi, Selangor
17:00 UTC+8			Daniel Irfan (?); Casagrande (?)	Stadium: Maybank (B) Field

27 November 2019 Friendly	PDRM	0–5	Penang	Kuala Lumpur, Malaysia
16:00 UTC+8			Afif (?); Syazwan (?); Maguire (?); Amer (?); Marcus (?)	Stadium: PULAPOL Field

12 December 2019 Friendly	AFC Rangers	0–3	Penang	Batu Kawan, Penang
17:00 UTC+8			Al-Hafiz (?); Afif (?); Shin (?)	Stadium: Penang State Stadium

20 December 2019 Friendly	PDRM	1–2	Penang	Kuala Lumpur, Malaysia
16:30 UTC+8			Alfussainey (?); Anzite (?)	Stadium: PULAPOL Field

21 December 2019 Friendly	UiTM	0–4	Penang	Bukit Jelutong, Selangor
16:30 UTC+8			Daniel Irfan (?); Casagrande (?)	Stadium: Sime Darby Field

27 December 2019 Friendly	Penang	0–0	PJ City	George Town, Penang
20:45 UTC+8				Stadium: City Stadium

10 January 2020 Friendly	Penang	9–1	Belantik City	Jawi, Penang
17:30 UTC+8	Rafael Vitor (?); Endrick (?); Casagrande (?); Faiz (?); Unknown (?)			Stadium: Jawi Public Field

11 January 2020 Friendly	Penang	4–0	Tambun Tulang F.C.	Batu Kawan, Penang
17:00 UTC+8	Amer (?); Endrick (?); Faiz (?); Nurshamil (?)			Stadium: Penang State Stadium

19 January 2019 Friendly	Gumarang	0–0	Penang	Medan, Indonesia
17:00 UTC+8				Stadium: Kebun Bunga Stadium

23 January 2020 Friendly	Penang	2–0	Manjung City	George Town, Penang
20:15 UTC+8	Casagrande 19'; Wan Faiz 50'			Stadium: City Stadium

28 January 2020 Friendly	Penang	2–0	Perak TBG	George Town, Penang
20:45 UTC+8	Casagrande 13'; Al-Hafiz 37'			Stadium: City Stadium; Attendance: 2,237

7 February 2020 Friendly	PJ City	0–0	Penang	Kuala Lumpur
21:00 UTC+8				Stadium: UM Arena Stadium

8 February 2020 Friendly	Ultimate	0–1	Penang	Subang Jaya
21:00 UTC+8			Syukur (? )	Stadium: MPSJ Stadium

18 February 2020 Friendly	Penang	2–2	Selangor	George Town, Penang
21:00 UTC+8	Endrick 18'; Gonzales 45'		Khyril 28'; Gan 63'	Stadium: City Stadium; Attendance: 2,083

20 February 2020 Friendly	Penang	2–0	Langkawi City	George Town, Penang
21:00 UTC+8	Nurshamil (? ) Gonzales (? )			Stadium: City Stadium

5 August 2020 Friendly	Selangor	4–1	Penang	Shah Alam, Selangor
20:30 UTC+8	Syahmi 8'; Rufino 41'; Bajram 55'; Wan Zack 81'		Afif 79'	Stadium: FAS Training Centre

7 August 2020 Friendly	UiTM	3–2	Penang	Shah Alam, Selangor
21:00 UTC+8	Hartmann 7'; Ataya 33'; Gustavo 90+3' (pen.)		Casagrande 13'; R. Vitor 39' (pen.)	Stadium: UiTM Stadium

14 August 2020 Friendly	Perak II	0–2	Penang	Manjung, Perak
21:00 UTC+8			R. Vitor 23', 66'	Stadium: Manjung Municipal Council Stadium

19 August 2020 Friendly	Kedah	2–3	Penang	Alor Setar, Kedah
21:00 UTC+8	Faizat 20', 28'		Amer 60'; Bobby 84'; R. Vitor 88' (pen.)	Stadium: Darulaman Stadium

=== Edy Rahmayadi Cup 2020 ===
16 January 2019 Semi final	Boeung Ket Angkor	3–2	Penang	Medan, Indonesia
17:30 UTC+8	Mizuno 3'; Vathanaka 9'; Fukui 63'		Casagrande 6'; Endrick 34'	Stadium: Teladan Stadium

18 January 2019 Third place playoff	PSMS Medan	1–1 (3–5 p)	Penang	Medan, Indonesia
17:30 UTC+8	Dwipan 58'	Report	Casagrande 20'	Stadium: Teladan Stadium
	Penalties
	Unknown (penalty scored); Dwipan (penalty scored); Nabar (penalty missed); Prambudi (penalty scored)		(penalty scored) Endrick; (penalty scored) R. Vitor; (penalty scored) Amer; (penalty scored) D. Irfan; (penalty scored) Nurshamil

== Competitions ==
=== Malaysia Premier League ===
==== League table ====
Pos	Team	Pld	W	D	L	GF	GA	GD	Pts	Qualification or relegation
1	Penang (P)	11	8	2	1	24	8	+16	26	Promotion to Super League
2	Terengganu II (Note: Johor Darul Ta'zim II, Perak II, Selangor II and Terengganu II cannot be promoted from Malaysia Premier League and play in Malaysia Cup as Johor Darul Ta'zim F.C., Perak FA, Selangor F.C. and Terengganu FC (their parent clubs) remain in Malaysia Super League and play in Malaysia Cup. Should the team be relegated to Malaysia Premier League or will not play in Malaysia Cup, Johor Darul Ta'zim II, Perak II, Selangor II and Terengganu II will have to drop to Malaysia M3 League or will play in Malaysia Cup.)	11	7	1	3	17	14	+3	22	
3	Kuala Lumpur (P)	11	6	3	2	21	14	+7	21	Promotion to Super League
4	Kuching	11	5	1	5	17	19	−2	16	
5	Johor Darul Ta'zim II	11	4	3	4	20	17	+3	15	

Updated to match(es) played on 31 October 2020. Source: MFL
Rules for classification: 1) Points; 2) Goal difference; 3) Number of goals scored.
(P) Promoted

==== Result summary ====
Overall								Home						Away					
Pld	W	D	L	GF	GA	GD	Pts	W	D	L	GF	GA	GD	W	D	L	GF	GA	GD
11	8	2	1	24	8	+16	26	5	1	0	16	4	+12	3	1	1	8	4	+4

Last updated: 9 October 2020.
Source: FA Penang

==== Results by matchday ====
Matchday	1	2	3	4	5	6	7	8	9	10	11
Ground	H	H	A	H	A	H	A	H	A	H	A
Result	W	W	D	D	W	W	W	W	W	W	L
Position	1	1	2	3	2	1	1	1	1	1	1

Updated to match(es) played on 9 October 2020. Source: FA Penang
A = Away; H = Home; W = Win; D = Draw; L = Loss

==== Matches ====
Win Draw Loss

1 March 2020 1	Penang	4–2	Sarawak United	Georgetown, Penang
21:00 UTC+8	Casagrande 7', 40'; Amer 35'; Endrick 53'	Report	Milad 43'; Patrick 63'	Stadium: City Stadium; Attendance: 4,330; Referee: Mohd Faisal Ridzuan

7 March 2020 2	Penang	4–1	Selangor II	Georgetown, Penang
21:00 UTC+8	Endrick 53'; Casagrande 54', 63', 67'	Report	Bajram 89'	Stadium: City Stadium; Attendance: 5,855; Referee: Faizzudin Ismail

10 March 2020 3	Perak II	1–1	Penang	Seri Manjung, Perak
21:00 UTC+8	Bruno Bezerra 70'	Report	Casagrande 20'	Stadium: Manjung Municipal Council Stadium; Attendance: 1,270; Referee: Ahmad Zuhaidi Dzulkifli

14 March 2020 4	Penang	0–0	Kuching	Georgetown, Penang
21:00 UTC+8		Report		Stadium: City Stadium; Attendance: 0 Referee: Shahrul Amin Abdul Aziz

29 August 2020 5	Kelantan	0–3	Penang	Kota Bahru, Kelantan
21:00 UTC+8		Report	Endrick 53' (pen.), 66' (pen.), 90+3'	Stadium: Sultan Muhammad IV Stadium; Attendance: 0 Referee: Hamdan Awang

4 September 2020 6	Penang	2–0	Negeri Sembilan	Georgetown, Penang
21:00 UTC+8	Casagrande 6'; Lee 62'	Report		Stadium: City Stadium; Attendance: 0 Referee: Mohd Zohri Tajudin

12 September 2020 7	Johor Darul Ta'zim II	1–2	Penang	Johor Bahru, Johor
21:00 UTC+8	Feroz 30'	Report	Azrin 4'; Endrick 44'	Stadium: Tan Sri Dato Haji Hassan Yunos Stadium; Attendance: 0 Referee: Khirulzauan Kidam

19 September 2020 8	Penang	2–1	Kuala Lumpur	Georgetown, Penang
21:00 UTC+8	Endrick 45'; R. Vitor 90+3'	Report	Indra 71'	Stadium: City Stadium; Attendance: 0 Referee: Faizudin Ismail

26 September 2020 9	UKM	1–2	Penang	Selayang, Selangor
16:45 UTC+8	Sunday 17'	Report	Casagrande 6'; Endrick 66' (pen.)	Stadium: Selayang Municipal Council Stadium; Attendance: 0 Referee: Nasrudin Tamrin

2 October 2020 10	Penang	4–0	Kelantan United	Georgetown, Penang
21:00 UTC+8	Lee 18'; Al-Hafiz 21'; Bobby 53'; Casagrande 74'	Report		Stadium: City Stadium; Attendance: 0 Referee: Hasman Hisam Asngari

9 October 2020 11	Terengganu II	1–0	Penang	Kuala Terengganu, Terengganu
21:00 UTC+8	Mintah 88'	Report		Stadium: Sultan Ismail Nasiruddin Shah Stadium; Attendance: 0 Referee: Khairulsyahmi Ahmad Khalidi

=== Malaysia FA Cup ===
Win Draw Loss

March 2020 Round 2	Penang	Cancelled ^{1}	Negeri Sembilan	George Town
21:00 UTC+8				Stadium: City Stadium

Notes:'

^1 2020 Season cancelled due to the 2020 Coronavirus Pandemic.

=== Malaysia Cup ===
Win Draw Loss

6 November 2020 Round of 16	Penang	3–1	FELDA United	George Town
21:00 UTC+8	Casagrande 37'; Amer 62'; Lee 76'	Report	Velez 49'	Stadium: City Stadium; Attendance: 0 Referee: Fairuzi Desa

12 November 2020 Quarter Final	Penang	Cancelled ^{1}	UiTM	George Town
21:00 UTC+8				Stadium: City Stadium

Notes:'

^1 2020 Season cancelled due to the 2020 Coronavirus Pandemic.

== Statistics ==
=== Appearances and goals ===
No.	Pos.	Name	League		FA Cup		Malaysia Cup		Total		Discipline	
No.	Pos.	Name	Apps	Goals	Apps	Goals	Apps	Goals	Apps	Goals	Yellow card	Red card
1	GK	(Malaysia) (England) Samuel Somerville	11	0	0	0	1	0	12	0	1	0
3	DF	(Malaysia) Raffi Nagoorgani	7(1)	0	0	0	0	0	7(1)	0	2	0
6	DF	(Malaysia) Khairul Akmal	1(3)	0	0	0	0(1)	0	1(4)	0	0	0
7	MF	(Malaysia) Syukur Saidin	6(1)	0	0	0	0(1)	0	6(2)	0	0	0
8	MF	(Malaysia) Khairu Azrin	10	1	0	0	1	0	11	1	4	0
9	FW	(Brazil) Casagrande	8(3)	9	0	0	1	1	9(3)	10	1	0
10	MF	(South Korea) Lee Chang-hoon	6(1)	2	0	0	1	1	7(1)	3	0	0
11	MF	(Malaysia) Amer Azhar	9(2)	1	0	0	1	1	10(2)	2	0	0
12	MF	(Malaysia) Al-Hafiz Harun	9(2)	1	0	0	1	0	10(2)	1	0	0
13	MF	(Malaysia) Latiff Suhaimi	9(1)	0	0	0	1	0	10(1)	0	3	0
14	MF	(Brazil) Endrick	10	8	0	0	1	0	11	8	2	0
15	DF	(Malaysia) Fairuz Zakaria	7(1)	0	0	0	1	0	8(1)	0	3	0
16	DF	(Malaysia) Zamri Pin Ramli	0(2)	0	0	0	0	0	0(2)	0	0	0
17	DF	(Brazil) Rafael Victor	11	1	0	0	1	0	12	1	3	0
18	FW	(Malaysia) Marcus Mah	0(1)	0	0	0	0	0	0(1)	0	0	0
19	FW	(Malaysia) Nurshamil Ghani	0	0	0	0	0(1)	0	0(1)	0	0	0
20	DF	(Malaysia) Azrie Reza	0	0	0	0	0	0	0	0	0	0
22	GK	(Malaysia) Ramadhan Hamid	0	0	0	0	0	0	0	0	0	0
23	MF	(Malaysia) Zharif Desa	0	0	0	0	0	0	0	0	0	0
25	GK	(Malaysia) Hazrull Hafiz	0	0	0	0	0	0	0	0	0	0
28	MF	(Malaysia) Wan Faiz	2(8)	0	0	0	0(1)	0	2(9)	0	0	0
30	MF	(Malaysia) Nurfais Johari	0	0	0	0	0	0	0	0	0	0
33	DF	(Malaysia) Azmi Muslim	11	0	0	0	1	0	12	0	1	0
55	MF	(Malaysia) Afif Azman	0	0	0	0	0	0	0	0	0	0
62	MF	(Malaysia) Danial Irfan	0(1)	0	0	0	0	0	0(1)	0	0	0
71	GK	(Malaysia) Al Imran Ishak	0	0	0	0	0	0	0	0	0	0
88	DF	(Malaysia) Yoges Muniandy	0	0	0	0	0	0	0	0	0	0
99	FW	(Malaysia) Bobby Gonzales	4(5)	1	0	0	0(1)	0	4(6)	1	0	0
Left club during season

Last updated: 6 November 2020.
Source: Soccerway

=== Top scorers ===
The list is sorted by shirt number when total goals are equal.

Rnk	Pos	No.	Player	League	FA Cup	Malaysia Cup	Total
1	FW	9	(Brazil) Casagrande	9	0	1	10
2	MF	14	(Brazil) Endrick	8	0	0	8
3	MF	10	(South Korea) Lee Chang-hoon	2	0	1	3
4	MF	11	(Malaysia) Amer Azhar	1	0	1	2
5	MF	8	(Malaysia) Khairu Azrin	1	0	0	1
5	MF	12	(Malaysia) Al-Hafiz Harun	1	0	0	1
5	DF	17	(Brazil) Rafael Victor	1	0	0	1
5	FW	99	(Malaysia) Bobby Gonzales	1	0	0	1

Last updated: 6 November 2020.
Source: Soccerway

=== Top assists ===
An assist is credited to a player for passing or crossing the ball to the scorer, a player whose shot rebounds (off a defender, goalkeeper or goalpost) to a teammate who scores, and a player who wins a penalty kick or a free kick for another player to convert.

The list is sorted by shirt number when total goals are equal.

Rnk	Pos	No.	Player	League	FA Cup	Malaysia Cup	Total
1	FW	9	(Brazil) Casagrande	6	0	0	6
2	MF	14	(Brazil) Endrick	5	0	0	5
3	MF	11	(Malaysia) Amer Azahar	3	0	1	4
3	MF	12	(Malaysia) Al-Hafiz Harun	3	0	1	4
5	MF	10	(South Korea) Lee Chang-hoon	2	0	0	2
6	DF	3	(Malaysia) Raffi Nagoorgani	1	0	0	1
6	DF	6	(Malaysia) Khairul Akmal	1	0	0	1
6	MF	8	(Malaysia) Khairu Azrin	1	0	0	1
6	DF	17	(Brazil) Rafael Vitor	1	0	0	1
6	DF	33	(Malaysia) Azmi Muslim	0	0	1	1
6	FW	99	(Malaysia) Bobby Gonzales	1	0	0	1

Last updated: 6 November 2020.
Source: Soccerway

=== Clean sheets ===
The list is sorted by shirt number when total clean sheets are equal.

Rnk	No.	Player	League	FA Cup	Malaysia Cup	Total
1	1	(Malaysia) Samuel Somerville	4	0	0	4

Last updated: 6 November 2020.
Source: Soccerway

=== Summary ===
Games played	12 (11 Malaysia Premier League) (1 Malaysia Cup)
Games won	9 (8 Malaysia Premier League) (1 Malaysia Cup)
Games drawn	2 (2 Malaysia Premier League)
Games lost	1 (1 Malaysia Premier League)
Goals scored	27 (24 Malaysia Premier League) (3 Malaysia Cup)
Goals conceded	9 (8 Malaysia Premier League) (1 Malaysia Cup)
Goal difference	18 (16 Malaysia Premier League) (2 Malaysia Cup)
Clean sheets	4 (4 Malaysia Premier League)
Yellow cards	20 (17 Malaysia Premier League) (3 Malaysia Cup)
Red cards	
Most appearances	6 players (12 appearances)
Top scorer	(Brazil) Casagrande (10 goals)
Winning Percentage	Overall: 9/12 (75.00%)

Last updated: 6 November 2020.
Source: Soccerway
