= Situmorang =

Batak surname originating in Indonesia

Situmorang is one of Toba Batak clans originating in North Sumatra, Indonesia. People of this clan bear the clan's name as their surname. Notable people of this clan include:

- Fiwi Dwipan Situmorang (born 1995), Indonesian footballer
- Martinus Dogma Situmorang (1946 - 2019), Indonesian Roman Catholic Bishop
- Sitor Situmorang (1924–2014), Indonesian poet, essayist and writer
- Sodjuangon Situmorang (born 1949), Indonesian bureaucrat
