= Syamer Kutty Abba =

Malaysian footballer

Syamer Kutty Abba شامير كوتتي اببا
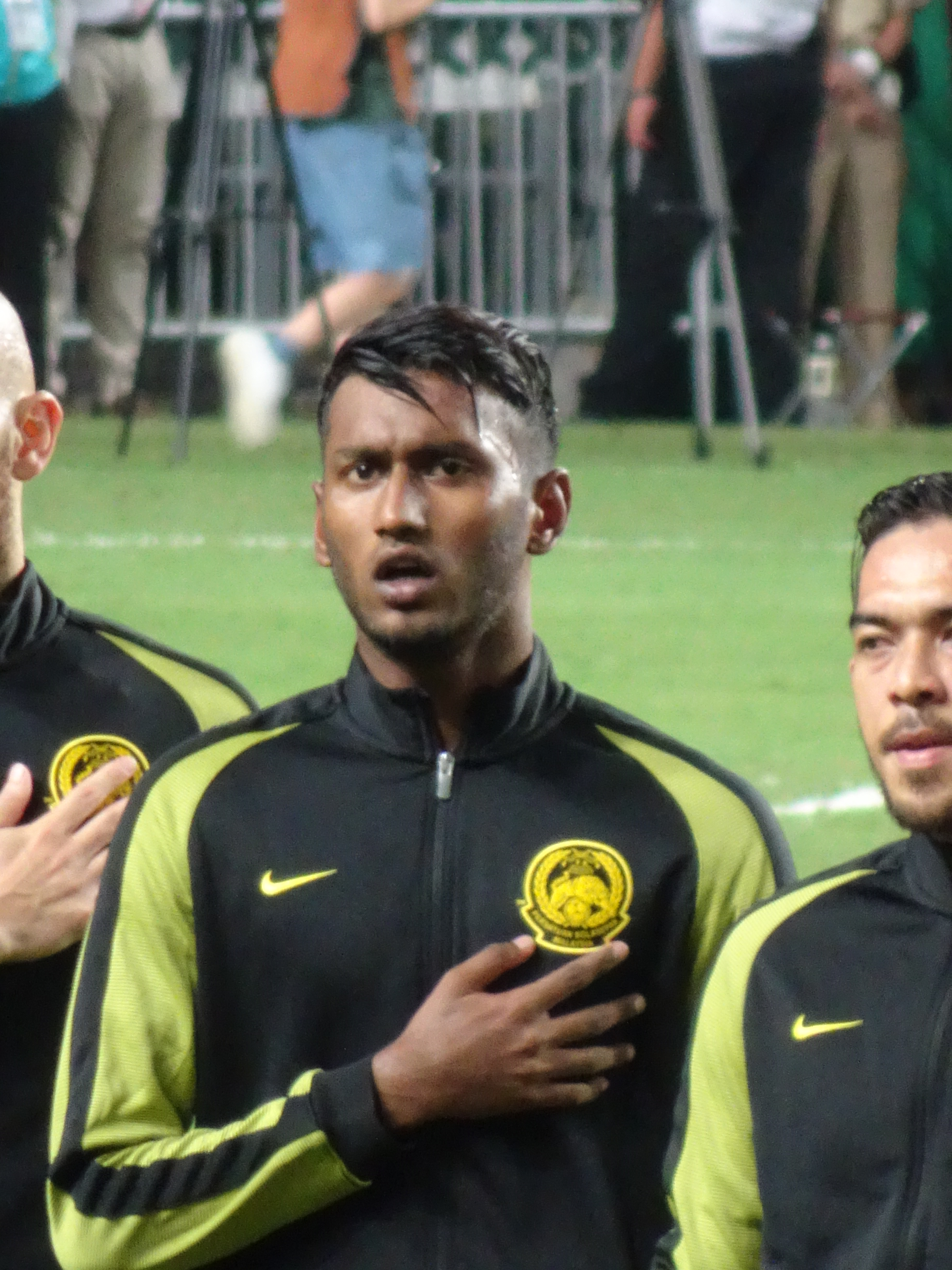
- Syamir with Malaysia in 2017

Personal information
- Full name: Mohammad Syamer bin Kutty Abba
- Date of birth: 1 October 1997 (age 29)
- Place of birth: Penang, Malaysia
- Height: 1.85 m (6 ft 1 in)
- Position: Midfielder

Team information
- Current team: Johor Darul Ta'zim
- Number: 41

Youth career
- 2013–2016: Penang
- 2014–2015: Harimau Muda C

Senior career*
Years	Team	Apps	(Gls)
2016–2017	Penang	25	(0)
2018–	Johor Darul Ta'zim	43	(1)
2018	→ Vilaverdense (loan)		
2024–2025	→ Penang (loan)	21	(0)
2025–2026	→ Kuala Lumpur City (loan)		

International career^{‡}
2013–2014	Malaysia U17		
2014–2017	Malaysia U20	9	(2)
2016–2019	Malaysia U23	30	(0)
2017–	Malaysia	42	(2)
Medal record
Men's football
Representing Malaysia
AFF Championship
Runner-up	2018
Sea Games
Silver medal – second place	Sea Games 2017	Football
- * Club domestic league appearances and goals as of 29 September 2024 ‡ National team caps and goals as of 21 December 2024

Mohammad Syamer bin Kutty Abba (Jawi: محمد شامير بن كوتتي اببا, IPA: [mohammad syamer bɪn kutty ab-ba]; born 1 October 1997) is a Malaysian professional footballer who plays as a midfielder for Malaysia Super League side Johor Darul Ta'zim and the Malaysia national football team. He mainly plays as a box-to-box midfielder, and can also play as defensive midfielder.

== Early life ==
He was born into a Malayali family at Kampung Dodol, George Town, Penang. He is the older brother of Malaysia international midfielder Haziq Kutty Abba.

Having made his Malaysia debut against Hong Kong in October 2017, he has gone on to make more than 20 appearances for his country. Mohammad Syamer Kutty Abba began his career at Penang in 2014. He moved to Harimau Muda C in December 2014.

His spell at Harimau Muda C didn't last long and in December 2015 he rejoined Penang, making 25 league appearances in 2 years. In November 2017 he joined Johor Darul Ta'zim, making 30 league appearances. During this time he also spent time on loan at Vilaverdense.

== Club career ==
=== Harimau Muda C ===
Syamer began his senior career playing in FAM League, representing Harimau Muda C in the 2014 Malaysia FAM League.

=== Penang ===
Since Harimau Muda has disbanded by FAM which means all the player from Harimau Muda A, Harimau Muda B and Harimau Muda C had to return to their own state. Syamer are with Penang FA for the Penang U21, before being promoted to first team in year 2016 to play in the top division of Malaysian football, the Malaysia Super League.

=== Johor Darul Ta'zim ===
On 18 November 2017, Syamer signed a contract with Johor Darul Ta'zim.

In late January 2018, it was announced that Syamer was loaned out to Portuguese third division club Vilaverdense on 27 January for a year-long loan stint alongside Dominic Tan, a fellow player from Johor Darul Ta'zim. But it was confirmed in early May that his stay would be a lot shorter than planned. An article by FOX Sports Asia concluded that he would return to Johor in June 2018, only having been on loan for six months.

For the 2023 season, he changed his jersey number to 77 giving his former no. 5 to the captain, Jordi Amat.

== International career ==
=== Youth ===
Syamer represented Malaysia at youth levels, playing for the under-17, -19, -20 and -23 levels.

In October 2017, Syamer received his first call-up to the Malaysia national team for the centralised training as a preparation for 2019 Asian Cup qualifiers Group B match against Hong Kong on 10 October 2017.

=== Senior ===
Syamer made his debut for Malaysia on 10 October 2017 against Hong Kong in a 2–0 defeat in the 2019 AFC Asian Cup qualifiers at the Hong Kong Stadium.

On 4 November 2018, he was named in the Malaysian national team squad for the 2018 AFF Championship.

On 27 May 2022, Syamer scored his first international goal against Brunei in a friendly match held at the Bukit Jalil National Stadium.

Syamer is also part of the Malaysian team that qualified for the 2023 AFC Asian Cup and played all 3 matches against Turkmenistan, Bahrain and Bangladesh in Third Round Group E Qualification. Syamer is also part of the squad that make it to the 2023 AFC Asian Cup making two appearances in the tournament against Bahrain and South Korea.

In the 2024 ASEAN Championship, Syamer was named as the captain of Malaysia for the tournament.

== Career statistics ==
=== Club ===
As of match played 19 July 2023

Appearances and goals by club, season and competition
Club	Season	League			Cup (Note: Includes Malaysia FA Cup)		League Cup (Note: Includes Malaysia Cup)		Continental (Note: Includes AFC Champions League and AFC Cup)		Total	
Club	Season	Division	Apps	Goals	Apps	Goals	Apps	Goals	Apps	Goals	Apps	Goals
Penang	2016	Malaysia Super League	4	0	0	0	–				4	0
Penang	2017	Malaysia Super League	21	0	2	0	–				23	0
Penang	Total		25	0	2	0	–				27	0
Johor Darul Ta'zim	2018	Malaysia Super League	4	0	0	0	5	0	0	0	9	0
Johor Darul Ta'zim	2019	Malaysia Super League	10	0	1	0	6	0	3	0	20	0
Johor Darul Ta'zim	2020	Malaysia Super League	6	0	0	0	0	0	1	0	7	0
Johor Darul Ta'zim	2021	Malaysia Super League	15	1	–		3	0	4	0	22	1
Johor Darul Ta'zim	2022	Malaysia Super League	1	0	1	0	0	0	1	0	3	0
Johor Darul Ta'zim	2023	Malaysia Super League	8	0	3	0	0	0	0	0	11	0
Total			43	1	3	0	14	0	9	0	69	1
Vilaverdense (loan)	2017–18	Campeonato de Portugal	1	0	0	0	0	0	–		1	0
Vilaverdense (loan)	Total		1	0	0	0	0	0	–		1	0
Johor Darul Ta'zim II	2018	Malaysia Premier League	1	0	–						1	0
Johor Darul Ta'zim II	2020	Malaysia Premier League	1	0	–						1	0
Johor Darul Ta'zim II	2022	Malaysia Premier League	1	0	–						1	0
Johor Darul Ta'zim II	Total		3	0	–						3	0
Career total			72	1	5	0	14	0	9	0	100	1

=== International ===
As of 4 September 2024.

Appearances and goals by national team and year
National team	Year	Apps	Goals
Malaysia	2017	2	0
Malaysia	2018	10	0
Malaysia	2019	7	0
Malaysia	2021	4	0
Malaysia	2022	7	1
Malaysia	2023	3	0
Malaysia	2024	4	1
Total		37	2

=== International goals ===
No.	Date	Venue	Opponent	Score	Result	Competition
1.	27 May 2022	Bukit Jalil National Stadium, Kuala Lumpur, Malaysia	Brunei	2–0	4–0	Friendly
2.	4 September 2024	Bukit Jalil National Stadium, Kuala Lumpur, Malaysia	Philippines	1–1	2–1	2024 Pestabola Merdeka

== Honours ==
=== Club ===
Johor Darul Ta'zim

- Malaysia Super League: 2018, 2019, 2020, 2021, 2022
- Malaysia FA Cup: 2022, 2023
- Malaysia Cup: 2019, 2022
- Malaysia Charity Shield: 2019, 2020, 2021, 2022, 2023

=== International ===
Malaysia

- Pestabola Merdeka: 2024
- AFF Championship : 2018 runner up

Malaysia U-23

- Southeast Asian Games (silver) Silver Medal: 2017

=== Individual ===
- AFF Best XI: 2019
