= K. Reuben =

Malaysian footballer

Personal information
- Full name: Reuben Thayaparan a/l Kathiripillai
- Date of birth: 2 April 1990 (age 36)
- Place of birth: Petaling Jaya, Malaysia
- Height: 1.70 m (5 ft 7 in)
- Position: Defender

Youth career
- 2008–2009: Kuala Lumpur Indians FA
- 2009–2010: PDRM U-21
- 2010–2012: Selangor U-23

Senior career*
Years	Team	Apps	(Gls)
2012–2015	ATM		
2015–2016	PDRM	15	(0)
2017	Penang	14	(0)
2018	PKNS	9	(0)
2019–2020	UKM		
2021–2023	Sarawak United		
2023	Harini F.C.		
2024–2025	Bunga Raya Damansara		

International career^{‡}
2012–2013	Malaysia U-23		
2011–2013	Malaysia	5	(0)
- * Club domestic league appearances and goals ‡ National team caps and goals as of January 24, 2017

Reuben Thayaparan a/l Kathiripillai (born 2 April 1990) is a Malaysian professional footballer who plays as a defender.

== Personal life ==
K. Reuben grew up on the premise of an orphanage in Selangor, which was set up by his parents the late Rev. Terrence K. K. Sinnadurai and Mrs. Kamala Sinnadurai.

== Career statistics ==
As of 27 June 2018

=== Club ===
Club	Season	League		Cup		League Cup		Continental		Total	
Club	Season	Apps	Goals	Apps	Goals	Apps	Goals	Apps	Goals	Apps	Goals
Penang	2017	14	0	2	0	0	0	–		16	0
Penang	Total	14	0	2	0	0	0	0	0	16	0
PKNS	2018	9	0	3	0	0	0	–		12	0

=== International ===
As of 6 July 2018

Malaysia
Year	Apps	Goals
2011	1	0
2013	4	0
Total	5	0

== Honours ==
=== Club ===
ATM

- Malaysia Premier League: 2012
- Malaysia Charity Shield: 2013

UKM

- IPT Football League: 2012 IPT Football League
