= Faizat Ghazli =

Malaysian footballer

Personal information
- Full name: Muhammad Faizat bin Mohamad Ghazli
- Date of birth: 28 November 1994 (age 31)
- Place of birth: Penang, Malaysia
- Height: 1.71 m (5 ft 7 in)
- Position: Forward

Team information
- Current team: Penang
- Number: 23

Youth career
- 2012: USM FC
- 2013–2015: Harimau Muda B
- 2015: Harimau Muda

Senior career*
Years	Team	Apps	(Gls)
2012	USM FC	5	(1)
2013	Harimau Muda B	20	(3)
2014	Harimau Muda A	17	(5)
2015	Harimau Muda B	16	(6)
2016–2017	Penang	34	(2)
2018–2019	PKNS	12	(0)
2020–2021	Kedah Darul Aman	20	(1)
2022–	Penang	15	(0)

International career^{‡}
2015	Malaysia U23	4	(0)
2021–	Malaysia	0	(0)
- * Club domestic league appearances and goals as of 12 September 2021 ‡ National team caps and goals as of 28 October 2017

Muhammad Faizat bin Mohamad Ghazli (born 28 November 1994) is a Malaysian professional footballer who plays as a forward for Malaysia Super League side Penang and the Malaysia national team.

Faizat is the younger brother of fellow footballer Failee Ghazli.

== Club career ==
=== Harimau Muda ===
Faizat started his football career with Harimau Muda B in 2013 until 2015. On 25 November 2015, it was confirmed that the Harimau Muda programme has disbanded by Football Association of Malaysia which means all the player from Harimau Muda A, Harimau Muda B and Harimau Muda C will be returned to their own state.

=== PKNS FC ===
In December 2017, Faizat signed a contract with Malaysia Super League club PKNS FC after two seasons at Penang.

=== Kedah FA ===
On 16 March 2020, Faizat signed a contract with Malaysia Super League club Kedah FA.

== International career ==
Faizat has featured in 2015 Southeast Asian Games represented Malaysia U23. He has made 4 appearances during the tournament.

== Career statistics ==
=== Club ===
As of 30 September 2022

Appearances and goals by club, season and competition
Club	Season	League			Cup		League Cup		Continental^{1}		Total	
Club	Season	Division	Apps	Goals	Apps	Goals	Apps	Goals	Apps	Goals	Apps	Goals
USM FC	2012	Malaysia Premier League	5	1	0	0	0	0	–		5	1
USM FC	Total		5	1	0	0	0	0	–		5	1
Harimau Muda B	2013	S.League	20	3	0	0	5	1	–		25	4
Harimau Muda B	Total		20	3	0	0	5	1	–		25	4
Harimau Muda A	2014	Football Queensland	17	5	0	0	0	0	–		17	5
Harimau Muda A	Total		17	5	0	0	0	0	–		17	5
Harimau Muda B	2015	S.League	16	6	0	0	0	0	–		16	6
Harimau Muda B	Total		16	6	0	0	0	0	–		16	6
Penang	2016	Malaysia Super League	18	2	1	0	–		–		19	2
Penang	2017	Malaysia Super League	16	0	2	0	–		–		18	0
Penang	Total		34	2	3	0	0	0	0	0	37	2
PKNS	2018	Malaysia Super League	2	0	0	0	5	1	–		7	1
PKNS	2019	Malaysia Super League	10	0	4	0	–		–		14	0
PKNS	Total		12	0	4	0	5	1	0	0	21	1
Kedah Darul Aman	2020	Malaysia Super League	4	0	0	0	1	0	–		5	0
Kedah Darul Aman	2021	Malaysia Super League	16	1	0	0	1	0	–		17	1
Kedah Darul Aman	Total		20	1	0	0	2	0	–		22	1
Penang	2022	Malaysia Super League	15	0	2	0	1	0	–		18	0
Penang	2023	Malaysia Super League	0	0	0	0	0	0	–		0	0
Penang	Total		15	0	2	0	1	0	–		18	0
Career Total			124	18	7	0	12	2	0	0	143	20

^{1} Includes AFC Cup and AFC Champions League.
