= Rafiuddin Roddin =

Malaysian footballer

Personal information
- Full name: Muhammad Rafiuddin bin Roddin
- Date of birth: 22 August 1989 (age 37)
- Place of birth: Tawau, Sabah, Malaysia
- Height: 1.71 m (5 ft 7 1/2 in)
- Positions: Left-back; winger

Team information
- Current team: Bukit Tambun
- Number: 20

Youth career
- 2007–2009: Penang President's Cup

Senior career*
Years	Team	Apps	(Gls)
2009–2010	Penang	9	(4)
2010–2011	Harimau Muda A	5	(0)
2011	→ Perak (loan)		
2012–2013	Perak		
2014–2017	Penang	35	(1)
2018–2021	Perak	49	(0)
2022	Penang	13	(0)
2023–	Kuching City		

International career^{‡}
2009–2010	Malaysia U21	5	(0)
- * Club domestic league appearances and goals as of August 4, 2021 ‡ National team caps and goals as of January 25, 2017

Muhammad Rafiuddin bin Roddin (born 22 August 1989 in Tawau) is a Malaysian footballer who plays for Malaysia Super League club Kuching City as a left-back. He also can plays as a winger.

== Club career ==
=== Perak FC ===
Rafiuddin signed a contract with Perak FC on loan from his former team Harimau Muda A in August 2011 for Perak's Malaysia Cup campaign. After with his impressive performance during the Malaysia Cup campaign, his move was made permanent for the 2012 season, along with other loanee Failee Ghazli.

After three seasons playing for Penang FC, Rafiuddin returned to Perak FC for 2018 season as a permanent transfer.

== Career statistics ==
=== Club ===
As of 28 July 2018

Appearances and goals by club, season and competition
Club	Season	League			Cup		League Cup		Continental		Total	
Club	Season	Division	Apps	Goals	Apps	Goals	Apps	Goals	Apps	Goals	Apps	Goals
Penang	2014	Malaysia Premier League	0	0	0	0	0	0	–		0	0
Penang	2015	Malaysia Premier League	0	0	0	0	0	0	–		0	0
Penang	2016	Malaysia Super League	21	0	1	0	0	0	–		22	0
Penang	2017	Malaysia Super League	14	1	1	0	0	0	–		15	1
Penang	Total		35	1	2	0	0	0	–		37	1
Perak	2018	Malaysia Super League	6	0	2	0	6	0	–		14	0
Perak	2019	Malaysia Super League	11	0	5	0	0	0	1	0	17	0
Perak	2020	Malaysia Super League	11	0	0	0	0	0	–		11	0
Perak	2021	Malaysia Super League	21	0	0	0	3	0	–		24	0
Perak	Total		49	0	7	0	9	0	1	0	66	0
Career total			84	1	9	0	9	0	1	0	103	1

== Honours ==
=== Club ===
Penang

- Malaysia Premier League: Promotion 2015
