= 2016 Malaysia Super League =

Malaysia Super League
- Season: 2016
- Dates: 13 February – 22 October 2016
- Champions: Johor Darul Ta'zim; 3rd Super League title 3rd Liga M title
- Relegated: PDRM Terengganu
- AFC Champions League: Johor Darul Ta'zim
- AFC Cup: Johor Darul Ta'zim; Felda United
- Matches: 132
- Goals: 385 (2.92 per match)
- Top goalscorer: (18 goals); Jorge Pereyra Díaz
- Biggest home win: (16 July 2016); Johor Darul Ta'zim 5–0 Kedah
- Biggest away win: (21 May 2016); Pahang 0–6 Johor Darul Ta'zim
- Highest scoring: (20 April 2016); Johor Darul Ta'zim 5–2 Sarawak (20 April 2016); Pahang 4–3 Kelantan (09 April 2016); Perak 3–4 Pahang (21 May 2016); Kelantan 2–5 Selangor (21 May 2016); Terengganu 1–6 Kelantan (15 July 2016); T-Team 3–4 Penang (16 July 2016)
- Longest winning run: (6 games); Johor Darul Ta'zim
- Longest unbeaten run: (22 games); Johor Darul Ta'zim
- Longest winless run: (5 games); Pahang, Perak
- Longest losing run: (5 games); Pahang
- Highest attendance: 26,800; Johor Darul Ta'zim 1–1 Selangor (16 February 2016)
- Lowest attendance: 0 (Stadium ban); Sarawak 0–2 T-Team (9 April 2016); Sarawak 1–1 Pahang (23 April 2016)
- Total attendance: 902,643
- Average attendance: 6,838
- All statistics correct as of 22 October 2016.

The 2016 Malaysia Super League (English: 2016 Super League) was the 13th season of the Malaysia Super League, the top-tier professional football league in Malaysia.

The season began on 13 February and concluded on 22 October 2016.

Johor Darul Ta'zim were the defending champions and retained the title from the previous season. They became the first club in the Malaysian football history to win the Liga Super title for three consecutive years.

Johor Darul Ta'zim also set a new record after went through the season without a single defeat – the first team ever to do so in a 22-fixtures league season. Johor Darul Ta'zim finished its "Invincibles" season with 18 wins, 4 draws, 0 defeats and 58 points in total.

== Team changes ==
The following teams have changed division.

=== To Malaysia Super League ===
Promoted from Premier League

- Kedah
- Penang
- T-Team

=== From Malaysia Super League ===
Relegated to Premier League

- ATM
- Sime Darby

End of (MoU)

- LionsXII

== Teams ==
Sime Darby were relegated after finishing bottom in the 2015 season. ATM were also relegated after losing the play-off to T-Team, which replaced LionsXII in the league.

Team	Team Based	Stadium	Capacity
Felda United	Bandar Pusat Jengka	Tun Abdul Razak Stadium	25,000
Johor Darul Ta'zim	Johor Bahru	Larkin Stadium	30,000
Kedah	Alor Setar	Darul Aman Stadium	32,387
Kelantan	Kota Bharu	Sultan Mohammad IV Stadium	22,000
PDRM	Kuala Lumpur	Hang Jebat Stadium	40,000
Pahang	Kuantan	Darul Makmur Stadium	40,000
Penang	George Town	Bandaraya Stadium	25,000
Perak	Ipoh	Perak Stadium	31,000
Sarawak	Kuching	Sarawak Stadium	40,000
Selangor	Shah Alam	Shah Alam Stadium	80,372
T-Team FC	Kuala Terengganu	Sultan Ismail Nasiruddin Shah Stadium	15,000
Terengganu	Kuala Terengganu	Sultan Mizan Zainal Abidin Stadium	50,000

=== Stadiums and locations ===
Locations of teams in the 2016 Liga Super
- Primary venues used in the Liga Super:

Felda United	Johor Darul Ta'zim	Kedah
Tun Abdul Razak Stadium	Larkin Stadium	Darul Aman Stadium
Capacity: **25,000**	Capacity: **30,000**	Capacity: **32,387**
Kelantan	PDRM	Pahang
Sultan Mohammad IV Stadium	Hang Jebat Stadium	Darul Makmur Stadium
Capacity: **22,000**	Capacity: **40,000**	Capacity: **40,000**
Penang	Perak	Sarawak
Bandaraya Stadium	Perak Stadium	Sarawak Stadium
Capacity: **25,000**	Capacity: **42,500**	Capacity: **40,000**
Selangor	T-Team	Terengganu
Shah Alam Stadium	Sultan Ismail Nasiruddin Shah Stadium	Sultan Mizan Zainal Abidin Stadium
Capacity: **80,372**	Capacity: **15,000**	Capacity: **50,000**

- ^{1} Correct as of end of 2015 Liga Super season

=== Personnel and sponsoring ===
Note: Flags indicate national team as has been defined under FIFA eligibility rules. Players may hold more than one non-FIFA nationality.

Team	Coach	Captain	Kit	Sponsor
Felda United	(Malaysia) Mohd Bin Nik (caretaker)	(Malaysia) Shukor Adan	FBT	FELDA
Johor Darul Ta'zim	(Argentina) Mario Gómez	(Malaysia) Safiq Rahim	Adidas	Forest City
Kedah	(Malaysia) Tan Cheng Hoe	(Malaysia) Khairul Helmi	Warrix	Discover Kedah 2016
Pahang	(Malaysia) Razip Ismail	(Malaysia) Matthew Davies	Puma	Aras Kuasa & Genting Resorts World (On the back of shirt)
Kelantan	(Bulgaria) Velizar Popov	(Malaysia) Mohd Badhri Mohd Radzi	De'eza DSV	Pamoga Qu Puteh & Chengal Jati
PDRM	(Malaysia) Fauzi Pilus	(Malaysia) Faizal Muhammad	Line 7	Puncak Niaga
Penang	(Croatia) Nenad Baćina	(Argentina) Matías Córdoba	Umbro	Penang Water Supply Corporation & Aspen Group
Perak	(Germany) Karl-Heinz Weigang	(Malaysia) Nasir Basharuddin	Al-Ikhsan	Lembaga Air Perak & Perak Corp.
Sarawak	(Malaysia) David Usop	(Malaysia) Ronny Harun	Starsport	Marina Parkcity
Selangor	(Malaysia) K. Gunalan (caretaker)	(Malaysia) Shahrom Kalam	Lotto	Selangor
T-Team	(Indonesia) Rahmad Darmawan	(Malaysia) Hasbullah Awang	Kobert	Terengganu Incorporated
Terengganu	(Malaysia) Mustaffa Kamal (caretaker)	(Malaysia) Ahmad Nordin Alias	Kobert	Terengganu Incorporated

=== Coaching changes ===
Team	Outgoing Head Coach	Manner of departure	Date of vacancy	Incoming Head Coach	Date of appointment
Kelantan	(Malaysia) Zahasmi Ismail	End of contract	29 November 2015	(Malaysia) K. Devan	5 December 2015
Selangor	(Australia) Mehmet Durakovic	End of contract	12 December 2015	(Malaysia) Zainal Abidin Hassan	31 December 2015
Pahang	(Malaysia) Zainal Abidin Hassan	End of contract	15 December 2015	(Malaysia) Ahmad Shaharuddin Rosdi	15 December 2015
T-Team	(Croatia) Tomislav Steinbruckner	End of contract	30 November 2015	(Indonesia) Rahmad Darmawan	8 December 2015
Terengganu	(Malaysia) Ahmad Yusoff	Sacked	23 February 2016	(England) Mike Mulvey	27 February 2016
Terengganu	(England) Mike Mulvey	Rested	18 July 2016	(Malaysia) Mustaffa Kamal (caretaker)	20 July 2016
Terengganu	(Malaysia) Mustaffa Kamal (caretaker)	End of caretaker spell	14 August 2016	(Malaysia) Che Ku Marzuki	15 August 2016
Pahang	(Malaysia) Ahmad Shaharuddin Rosdi	Resign	12 March 2016	(Malaysia) Razip Ismail	17 March 2016
Penang	(Brazil) Jacksen F. Tiago	Rested	6 April 2016	(Malaysia) Manzoor Azwira Abdul Wahid	7 April 2016
Penang	(Malaysia) Manzoor Azwira Abdul Wahid	End of caretaker spell	25 May 2016	(Croatia) Nenad Baćina	25 May 2016
Kelantan	(Malaysia) K. Devan	Resign	12 May 2016	(Bulgaria) Velizar Popov	13 May 2016
Perak	(Malaysia) Syamsul Saad	Demoted to assistant coach	30 May 2016	(Germany) Karl-Heinz Weigang	30 May 2016
Selangor	(Malaysia) Zainal Abidin Hassan	Sacked	7 August 2016	(Malaysia) K. Gunalan (caretaker)	8 August 2016
Felda United	(Malaysia) Irfan Bakti	Resign	24 September 2016	(Malaysia) Mohamad Nik (caretaker)	17 October 2016

=== Foreign players ===
Players name in bold indicates the player is registered during the mid-season transfer window.

Club	Player 1	Player 2	Player 3	Player 4 (Asian)	Former
Felda United	(Brazil) Gilberto Alemão	(Liberia) Zah Rahan Krangar	(Liberia) Francis Doe	(Uzbekistan) Lutfulla Turaev	
Johor Darul Ta'zim	(Brazil) Marcos Antônio	(Argentina) Jorge Pereyra Díaz	(Argentina) Juan Martín Lucero	(Singapore) Hariss Harun	
Kedah	(Kosovo) Liridon Krasniqi	**(New Zealand) Shane Smeltz**	**(Brazil) Thiago Augusto**	(South Korea) Bang Seung-Hwan	(Brazil) Sandro (Brazil) Kahê
Kelantan	**(Senegal) Morgaro Gomis**	**(Brazil) Wander Luiz**	(North Macedonia) Baže Ilijoski	(Australia) Jonathan McKain	(Brazil) Jonatan Lucca (Mali) Dramane Traoré
Pahang	**(Brazil) Jailton**	**(Chile) Claudio Meneses**	**(Argentina) Pablo Vranjicán**	**(Afghanistan) Faysal Shayesteh**	(Slovenia) Nejc Potokar (Argentina) Germán Pacheco (Slovenia) Dalibor Volaš (Pakistan) Zesh Rahman
PDRM	(Mali) Souleymane Konaté	(Brazil) Andrezinho	**(Brazil) Guilherme de Paula**	(Singapore) Safuwan Baharudin	(Maldives) Ali Ashfaq
Penang	(Brazil) Reinaldo Lobo	(Argentina) Matias Cordoba	**(Nigeria) Ranti Martins**	**(South Korea) Jeong Seok-min**	(Nigeria) Osas Saha (Australia) Brent Griffiths
Perak	(Brazil) Thiago Junior	(Brazil) Elias	**(Albania) Xhevahir Sukaj**	**(Uzbekistan) Oybek Kilichev**	(Liberia) Erick Weeks Lewis (Uzbekistan) Vokhid Shodiev
Sarawak	**(Liberia) Teah Dennis Jr.**	(Timor-Leste) Juninho	(Brazil) Gilmar	(Australia) Ndumba Makeche	(Italy) Davide Grassi
Selangor	**(Nigeria) Ugo Ukah**	(Argentina) Mauro Olivi	(Liberia) Patrick Wleh	(Indonesia) Andik Vermansyah	(Australia) Robert Cornthwaite
Terengganu	(Cameroon) Vincent Bikana	**(Armenia) Karen Harutyunyan**	**(Montenegro) Bogdan Milić**	(Canada) (Japan) Issey Nakajima-Farran	(Argentina) Gustavo López (Argentina) Juan José Morales
T–Team	(Mali) Abdoulaye Maïga	(Mali) Makan Konaté	**(Brazil) Patrick Cruz**	**(Uzbekistan) Dilshod Sharofetdinov**	(Croatia) Tomislav Bušić (Nepal) Rohit Chand

== Results ==
=== League table ===
Pos	Team	Pld	W	D	L	GF	GA	GD	Pts	Qualification or relegation
1	Johor Darul Ta'zim (C)	22	18	4	0	56	14	+42	58	Qualification to AFC Champions League preliminary round 2 (Note: Also qualification to AFC Cup group stage if failed to qualify for the AFC Champions League group stage.)
2	Felda United	22	13	4	5	47	27	+20	43	Qualification to AFC Cup group stage (Note: Since the winners of 2016 Piala FA, Johor Darul Ta'zim, currently qualify for AFC Champions League based on their league position, the spot awarded to the Piala FA winner (AFC Cup group stage) would be passed to the next best team in the table (in this case, the second-placed team).)
3	Kedah	22	11	7	4	30	26	+4	37 (Note: Kedah Football Association (Kedah FA) has been found guilty of putting the suspended player during the match against Pahang on August 3, 2016. Therefore, the Football Association of Malaysia (FAM) has been awarded 3 points for Pahang and Kedah sentenced deducted 3 points for the incident.)	
4	Kelantan	22	7	8	7	37	33	+4	29	
5	Selangor	22	7	7	8	28	27	+1	28	
6	Perak	22	7	7	8	29	30	−1	28	
7	T–Team	22	7	6	9	30	34	−4	27	
8	Sarawak	22	6	6	10	32	40	−8	24	
9	Pahang	22	5	6	11	22	41	−19	24 (Note: Pahang has been awarded 3 points free from the Football Association of Malaysia (FAM) after offenses committed by the Football Association of Kedah (Kedah FA) putting the suspended player during the match against Pahang on August 3, 2016.)	
10	Penang	22	5	7	10	32	37	−5	22	
11	PDRM (R)	22	5	6	11	21	32	−11	21	Relegation to Liga Premier
12	Terengganu (R)	22	5	4	13	21	44	−23	19	Relegation to Liga Premier

Source: SPMB Football Association of Malaysia, Football Malaysia LLP
Rules for classification: 1) Points; 2) Goal difference; 3) Number of goals scored; 3) Number of goals against.
(C) Champions; (R) Relegated

=== Result table ===
Home \ Away	FEL	JDT	KED	KEL	PHG	PEN	PRK	PDRM	SWK	SEL	TTE	TRG
Felda United		2–3	2–0	2–0	2–0	2–2	2–1	4–0	3–3	3–1	2–0	2–2
Johor Darul Ta'zim	2–1		5–0	1–0	3–0	1–0	2–1	4–0	5–2	1–1	5–1	3–0
Kedah	1–0	1–1		2–1	0–3	2–2	3–1	2–0	2–1	1–0	1–0	1–0
Kelantan	1–1	2–2	1–2		0–0	3–1	2–2	1–0	2–2	2–5	2–0	3–0
Pahang	0–3	0–6	1–1	4–3		1–0	1–2	0–2	2–0	1–3	2–2	1–2
Penang	1–2	1–1	3–2	2–3	4–1		1–1	1–1	1–2	1–1	2–3	1–0
Perak	3–2	0–1	0–0	0–0	3–4	4–1		1–0	0–3	0–1	0–0	2–0
PDRM	1–2	0–2	1–1	1–2	1–0	2–2	2–2		1–0	0–0	1–2	3–1
Sarawak	1–2	1–2	1–1	1–1	1–1	0–2	3–2	2–1		1–1	0–2	2–1
Selangor	1–2	1–2	2–2	0–0	0–1	1–0	0–1	2–1	4–2		2–1	1–1
T–Team	3–2	0–2	4–1	4–2	1–1	3–4	0–0	1–1	1–2	1–0		0–0
Terengganu	1–4	0–2	0–3	1–6	1–1	1–0	2–3	0–2	3–2	3–1	2–1	

Updated to match(es) played on 22 October 2016. Source: Liga Super 1, Liga Super 2
Legend: Blue = home team win; Yellow = draw; Red = away team win.

=== Positions by round ===
The table lists the positions of teams after each week of matches. In order to preserve chronological evolvements, any postponed matches are not included in the round at which they were originally scheduled, but added to the full round they were played immediately afterwards. For example, if a match is scheduled for matchday 13, but then postponed and played between days 16 and 17, it will be added to the standings for day 16.

Team \ Round	01	02	03	04	05	06	07	08	09	10	11	12	13	14	15	16	17	18	19	20	21	22
Johor Darul Ta'zim	6	2	2	2	1	1	2	2	2	2	2	1	1	1	1	1	1	1	1	1	1	1
Felda United	1	1	1	3	2	2	1	1	1	1	1	2	2	2	2	2	2	2	2	2	2	2
Kedah	12	8	7	4	6	4	5	6	7	7	5	5	6	4	4	4	4	3	3	3	3	3
Kelantan	8	4	4	7	5	6	6	7	5	6	6	8	4	5	5	7	5	5	5	6	4	4
Selangor	7	3	3	1	3	3	4	3	4	3	3	3	3	3	3	3	3	4	4	4	5	5
Perak	9	9	9	9	9	11	11	9	8	9	9	10	11	8	6	5	6	6	6	7	6	6
T–Team	5	7	11	10	10	8	7	4	3	4	4	4	5	6	8	6	8	7	7	5	7	7
Sarawak	11	12	10	11	11	10	10	12	12	12	10	9	9	11	10	8	10	10	9	9	9	8
Pahang	4	11	12	12	12	12	12	10	10	10	11	11	10	10	12	12	12	12	12	12	8	9
Penang	10	5	5	6	7	9	9	11	11	11	12	12	12	12	11	11	9	9	11	10	11	10
PDRM	2	7	6	8	8	7	3	5	6	5	7	7	8	9	7	9	7	8	8	8	10	11
Terengganu	3	6	8	5	4	5	8	8	9	8	8	6	7	7	9	10	11	11	10	11	12	12

Leader
Relegation to 2017 Liga Premier

=== Relegation play-off ===
30 January 2016
21:00 UTC+8

ATM	1–2	(Terengganu) T-Team
Shukri 50'		Takhiyuddin 26'; Bušić 44'

Perak Stadium, Perak
Attendance: 500

T-Team have qualified for the 2016 Malaysia Super League season.

== Statistics ==
=== Scoring ===
==== Top scorers ====
As of matches played on 22 October 2016

Rank	Player	Club	Goals
1	(Argentina) Jorge Pereyra Díaz	Johor Darul Ta'zim	18
2	(Argentina) Juan Martín Lucero	Johor Darul Ta'zim	16
3	(Liberia) Francis Forkey Doe	Felda United	15
4	(North Macedonia) Baže Ilijoski	Kelantan	14
5	(Brazil) Patrick Cruz	T–Team	10
6	(Brazil) Elias Fernandes	Perak	9
6	(Australia) Ndumba Makeche	Sarawak	9
6	(Liberia) Patrick Wleh	Selangor	9
7	(Liberia) Zah Rahan Krangar	Felda United	8
7	(Uzbekistan) Lutfulla Turaev	Felda United	8
7	(Brazil) Gilmar	Sarawak	8

=== Own goals ===
Rank	Player	For	Club	Date	Goals
1	(Slovenia) Nejc Potokar	Felda United	Pahang	12/03/16	1
1	(Malaysia) Yong Kuong Yong	Felda United	Terengganu	04/04/16	1
1	(Malaysia) Kamal Azizi	Kelantan	T–Team	05/04/16	1
1	(Malaysia) Mohd Shahrol Saperi	Johor Darul Ta'zim	Sarawak	20/04/16	1
1	(Malaysia) Fadhli Shas	Sarawak	Johor Darul Ta'zim	20/04/16	1
1	(Brazil) Thiago Junior Aquino	Sarawak	Perak	19/05/16	1
1	(Malaysia) Tommy Mawat Bada	Kedah	Sarawak	16/08/16	1
1	(Mali) Abdoulaye Maïga	Johor Darul Ta'zim	T–Team	24/09/16	1
1	(Nigeria) Ugo Ukah	Perak	Selangor	24/09/16	1

=== Hat-tricks ===
Player	Club	Against	Result	Date
(Slovenia) Dalibor Volaš	Pahang	Perak	3 – 4	9 April 2016
(Argentina) Jorge Pereyra Díaz	Johor Darul Ta'zim	Pahang	0 – 6	21 May 2016
(North Macedonia) Baže Ilijoski	Kelantan	Terengganu	1 – 6 ^{4}	15 July 2016
(Brazil) Patrick Cruz	T-Team	Penang	3 – 4	16 July 2016
(Argentina) Juan Martín Lucero	Johor Darul Ta'zim	T-Team	5 – 1	24 September 2016

Note

^{4} Player scored 4 goals

=== Clean sheets ===
As of matches played on 22 October 2016

Rank	Player	Club	Clean sheets
1	(Malaysia) Farizal Harun	Felda United	6
1	(Malaysia) Mohd Izham Tarmizi	Johor Darul Ta'zim	6
1	(Malaysia) Muhd Hafizul Hakim	Perak	6
1	(Malaysia) Khairul Fahmi	Kelantan	6
2	(Malaysia) Farizal Marlias	Johor Darul Ta'zim	5
3	(Malaysia) Ifwat Akmal	Kedah	4
3	(Malaysia) Haziq Nadzli	PDRM	4
4	(Malaysia) Farhan Abu Bakar	Kedah	3
4	(Malaysia) Wan Azraie Wan Teh	T–Team	3

=== Discipline ===
==== Players ====
As of matches played on 23 July 2016.

#	Player	Club	Total	
#	Player	Club	Booked	Sent off (straight red)
1	(Malaysia) Salamon Raj	Pahang	3	1
1	(Malaysia) Adib Aizuddin	Felda United	3	1
1	(Malaysia) Joseph Kalang Tie	Terengganu	3	1
4	(Malaysia) Nazmi Faiz	Selangor	2	1
5	(Cameroon) Vincent Bikana	Terengganu	1	1
5	(Malaysia) Saiful Nizam Miswan	Pahang	1	1
5	(Mali) Souleymane Konaté	PDRM	1	1
5	(Malaysia) Wan Zaharulnizam	Kelantan	1	1
5	(Malaysia) Lot Abu Hassan	PDRM	1	1
10	(Malaysia) Wan Zack Haikal	Kelantan	0	1

==== Club ====
As of matches played on 23 July 2016.

Rank	Club	Total	
Rank	Club	Booked	Sent off (straight red)
1	Kelantan	25	2
1	PDRM	25	2
3	Terengganu	20	2
4	Pahang	15	2
5	Felda United	22	1
6	Selangor	17	1
7	Penang	28	0
8	Johor Darul Ta'zim	18	0
9	Perak	17	0
10	Kedah	15	0
11	Perak	14	0
12	Sarawak	13	0

== Awards ==
=== Monthly awards ===
Month	Player of the Month		Coach of the Month		Reference
Month	Player	Club	Manager	Club	Reference
February	(Malaysia) Mohd Faiz Subri	Penang	(Malaysia) Zainal Abidin Hassan	Selangor	
March	(Argentina) Jorge Pereyra Díaz	Johor Darul Ta'zim	(Argentina) Mario Gómez	Johor Darul Ta'zim	
April	(Argentina) Juan Martín Lucero	Johor Darul Ta'zim			
May	(Malaysia) Mohd Izham Tarmizi	Johor Darul Ta'zim			
June	—	–			
July	(Malaysia) Fazrul Hazli Kadri	Perak			
August	(Malaysia) Baddrol Bakhtiar	Kedah			
September	(Brazil) Thiago Augusto	Kedah			

== Attendance ==
=== Crowd Attendance For All Venues ===
HOME	AWAY												ATTENDANCE	
HOME	FEL	JDT	KED	KEL	PHG	PEN	PRK	PDRM	SWK	SEL	TTE	TRG	TOTAL	AVE
Felda United FC	-----	16,640	8,510	10,981	15,574	3,902	3,651	3,567	1,615	10,385	4,056	3,544	82,605	7,510
JDT FC	16,528	-----	10,580	16,550	15,514	15,513	20,357	7,780	13,860	26,800	24,280	24,220	191,982	17,453
Kedah	3,330	8,763	-----	16,500	7,863	8,400	16,500	3,338	6,270	10,064	5,450	17,000	103,421	9,402
Kelantan	3,536	13,543	2,408	-----	15,562	4,315	2,506	13,253	6,532	17,653	7,212	3,315	89,475	8,134
Pahang	898	5,733	3,508	5,634	-----	1,782	2,501	1,817	3,719	1,700	9,912	6,023	43,227	3,930
Penang	7,161	13,727	12,218	9,019	4,704	-----	9,279	3,258	3,789	5,875	3,187	8,095	80,312	7,301
Perak TBG	7,210	26,000	20,600	21,000	6,670	3,680	-----	7,100	1,700	17,300	7,400	3,117	121,687	11,062
PDRM	500	23,000	2,000	700	500	750	300	-----	750	2,000	150	2,300	32,950	2,995
Sarawak	6,123	5,916	4,200	585	0	1,496	1,670	1,399	-----	548	0	955	22,892	2,081
Selangor	3,729	8,929	8,063	9,731	1,647	3,234	3,295	2,755	6,200	-----	4,981	2,379	54,943	4,995
T-Team FC	1,632	2,126	4,120	2,034	509	2,139	1,007	775	216	761	-----	4,891	20,210	1,837
Terengganu	7,250	11,300	768	7,500	421	15,700	4,300	1,300	900	7,200	2,300	-----	58,939	5,358
TOTAL LEAGUE CROWD ATTENDANCE													902,643	6,838

=== By Week ===
2016 Liga Super Attendance
Round	Total	Games	Avg. Per Game	Match With Most Attendance
Week 1	63,772	6	10,629	26,800; Johor Darul Ta'zim 1–1 Selangor
Week 2	60,506	6	10,084	17,300; Perak 0–1 Selangor
Week 3	53,251	6	8,875	20,600; Perak 0–0 Kedah
Week 4	55,305	6	9,218	16,528; Johor Darul Ta'zim 2–1 Felda United
Week 5	61,869	6	10,312	23,000; PDRM 1–1 Johor Darul Ta'zim
Week 6	43,310	6	7,218	20,357; Johor Darul Ta'zim 2–1 Perak
Week 7	41,298	6	6,883	13,543; Kelantan 2–2 Johor Darul Ta'zim
Week 8	34,715	6	5,786	13,860; Kedah 5–2 Johor Darul Ta'zim
Week 9	24,385	6	4,064	8,763; Johor Darul Ta'zim 1–1 Penang
Week 10	36,183	6	6,031	15,513; Johor Darul Ta'zim 1–0 Penang
Week 11	42,305	6	7,051	15,514; Johor Darul Ta'zim 3–0 Pahang
Week 12	33,288	6	5,548	17,653; Kelantan 2–5 Selangor
Week 13	30,344	6	5,057	10,580; Johor Darul Ta'zim 5–0 Kedah
Week 14	36,426	6	6,070	15,562; Kelantan 0–0 Pahang
Week 15	36,514	6	6,086	16,550; Johor Darul Ta'zim 1–0 Kelantan
Week 16	33,915	6	5,653	13,727; Penang 1–1 Johor Darul Ta'zim
Week 17	48,816	6	8,136	26,000; Perak 0–1 Johor Darul Ta'zim
Week 18	27,353	6	4,559	9,019; Penang 2–3 Kelantan
Week 19	23,487	6	3,915	16,640; Felda United 2–3 Johor Darul Ta'zim
Week 20	47,842	6	7,973	24,220; Johor Darul Ta'zim 3–0 Terengganu
Week 21	32,440	6	5,407	24,280; Johor Darul Ta'zim 5–1 T–Team
Week 22	24,738	6	4,123	8,929; Selangor 1–2 Johor Darul Ta'zim
Total	892,062	132	6,758	-

source: Sistem Pengurusan Maklumat Bolasepak

== Number of teams by states and federal territories ==
States and federal territories	Total	Teams
Johor	1	Johor Darul Ta'zim
Kedah	1	Kedah
Kelantan	1	Kelantan
Kuala Lumpur	2	Felda United; PDRM
Pahang	1	Pahang
Penang	1	Penang
Perak	1	Perak TBG
Sarawak	1	Sarawak
Selangor	1	Selangor
Terengganu	2	T-Team; Terengganu

== See also ==
- 2016 Liga Premier
- 2016 Liga FAM
- 2016 Piala FA
- 2016 Piala Malaysia
- 2016 Piala Presiden
- 2016 Piala Belia
- List of Malaysian football transfers 2016
- List of Malaysian football transfers summer 2016
