= Mohd Faiz Subri =

Malaysian footballer

Faiz Subri
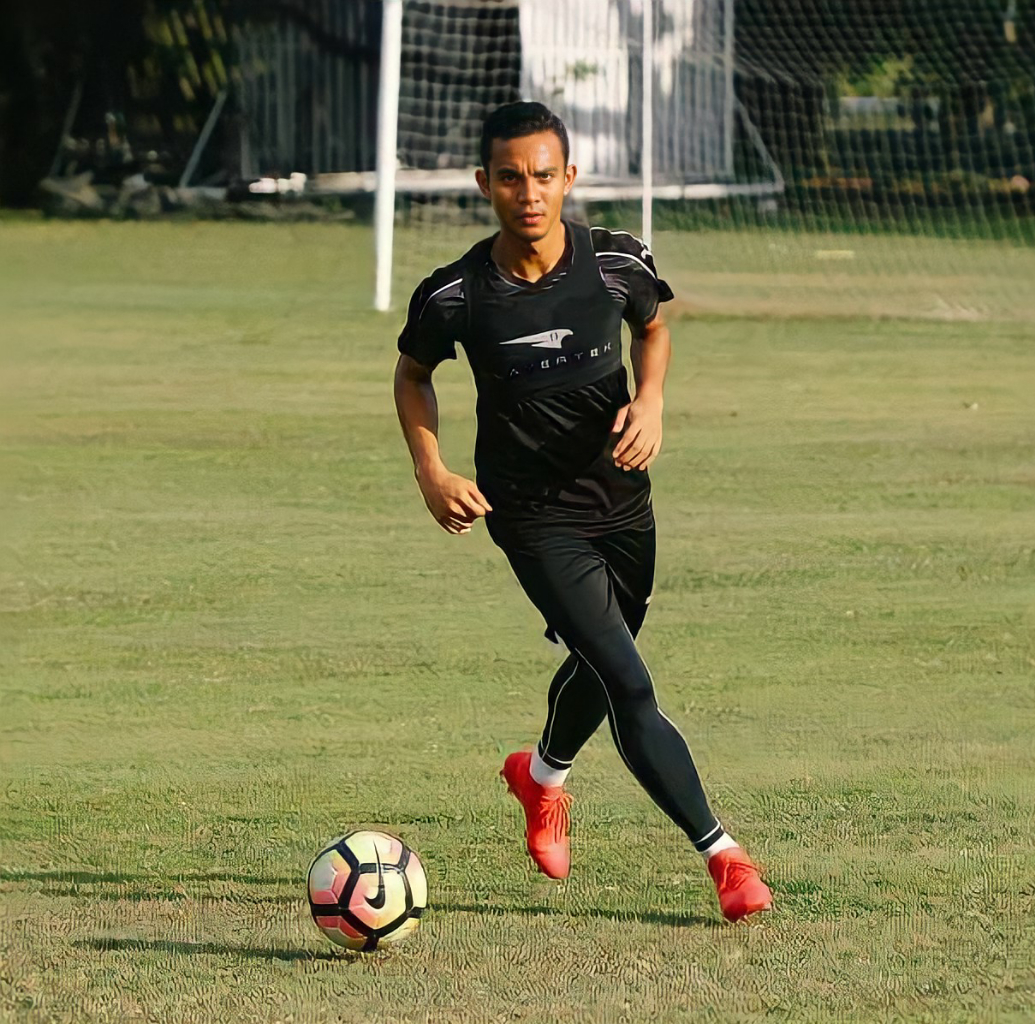
- Faiz in 2018

Personal information
- Full name: Mohd Faiz bin Subri
- Date of birth: 8 November 1987 (age 39)
- Place of birth: Ayer Hitam, Kubang Pasu, Kedah, Malaysia
- Height: 1.69 m (5 ft 6 1/2 in)
- Positions: Winger; striker

Team information
- Current team: Penang
- Number: 13

Youth career
- 2006–2009: Kedah

Senior career*
Years	Team	Apps	(Gls)
2009	Tambun Tulang	14	(6)
2010–2011	Perlis	34	(5)
2012	T-Team	26	(9)
2013	Kelantan	15	(2)
2014	Terengganu	9	(1)
2015–2019	Penang	73	(16)
2020	Northern Lions	0	(0)
2021	Kuala Kangsar	0	(0)
2022–	Penang	8	(0)
- * Club domestic league appearances and goals as of 18 July 2022 ‡ National team caps and goals as of 7 June 2016

Mohd Faiz bin Subri (born 8 November 1987) is a Malaysian professional footballer who plays as an attacking midfielder or forward for Malaysia Super League side Penang. He is best known for his free-kick goal which won him the 2016 FIFA Puskás Award.

== Early life ==
Faiz was born and raised in Ayer Hitam, Kedah. He is the third of five siblings. He received his primary and secondary education in Kedah, at Sekolah Kebangsaan Tengku Laksamana and Sekolah Menengah Kebangsaan Permatang Bonglai respectively, before transferring to Sekolah Menengah Teknik Arau in Perlis.

== Club career ==
=== Kedah, Tambun Tulang, Perlis, T-Team ===
Faiz began his football career playing for the Kedah youth team in 2006. In 2009, Faiz signed with FAM League club Tambun Tulang. He made 14 league appearances and 6 league goals during his season with the club. Tambun Tulang also Perlis in Piala Emas Raja-Raja 2009.

In 2010, Faiz signed with Malaysia Super League side Perlis. He played for two seasons with Perlis before decided to leave the club for T-Team and signed a one-year contract with T–Team.

=== Kelantan, Terengganu ===
In 2013, Faiz signed a one-year contract with Kelantan FA along with his former teammate Zairo Anuar, where he score one goal against a Vietnamese football club, SHB Đà Nẵng in the AFC Cup group stage match. Faiz successfully made 28 appearances and 5 goals for Kelantan before his departure at the end of the 2013 season.

In 2014, Faiz signed a one-year contract with Terengganu FA. He managed to make 14 appearances and 1 goal during his season with Terengganu FA.

=== Penang ===
After cutting short his stay with Terengganu FA, Faiz signed a contract with Penang FA along with his Terengganu FA teammate Mazlizam Mohamad. He helped Penang FA earn second place in the 2015 Malaysia Premier League, and the team was consequently promoted to the 2016 Malaysia Super League.

=== Kuala Kangsar ===
In March 2021, Faiz joined Kuala Kangsar FC.

=== Second spell with Penang ===
In 2022, he returned to play for Penang for the second time.

== International career ==
Faiz was first called up to the Malaysia national team in 2012 and 2013 under K. Rajagopal, but he never made any appearance in either call-ups. After strong performance in 2015 with his team Penang, he was recalled to the national team in August 2015 under coach Dollah Salleh.

== Style of play ==
Faiz is an attacking midfielder who also plays as a winger and a striker. His playing style is characterized by his pace, long-range shooting, and passing range. Additionally, he frequently serves as a free-kick specialist for his teams.

== FIFA Puskás Award 2016 ==
On 16 February 2016, Faiz scored a free kick in a 4–1 win over Pahang FA at the City Stadium in George Town. Videos of his free kick soon went viral on social media, and he was nominated by the Football Association of Malaysia for the FIFA Puskás Award later that year.

In 2017, Faiz was awarded the FIFA Puskás Award for the free kick goal, becoming the first-ever Asian to have won the international award for the best goal of the year.

== Career statistics ==
=== Club ===
As of 18 July 2018

Club	Season	League		FA Cup		Malaysia Cup		Continental		Total	
Club	Season	Apps	Goals	Apps	Goals	Apps	Goals	Apps	Goals	Apps	Goals
Tambun Tulang	2009	14	6	–						14	6
Perlis	2010	13	2	1	0	8	3	–		22	5
Perlis	2011	21	3	1	0	–				22	3
T–Team	2012	26	9	4	1	6	1	–		36	11
Kelantan	2013	15	2	3	2	6	0	4	1	28	5
Terengganu	2014	9	1	0	0	5	0	–		14	1
Penang	2015	21	9	2	1	–				23	10
Penang	2016	16	2	1	0	–				17	2
Penang	2017	20	2	2	0	–				22	2
Penang	2018	16	3	0	0	–				16	3
Career total		243	39	14	4	25	4	4	1	272	48

== Honours ==
Kelantan

- Malaysia FA Cup: 2013
- Malaysia Cup runner-up: 2013

Penang

- Malaysia Premier League promotion: 2015

Individual

- FIFA Puskás Award: 2016
- PFAM Player of the Month February: 2016
- FAM Football Awards – FAM Special Award: 2016 – Penang

=== Awards and recognition ===
- Kedah
  - Companion of the Ahli Cemerlang Semangat Jerai Kedah (ASK) (2017)
- Penang
  - Community Service Medal (PJM) (2025)
