= Amirul Asyraf Suhaidi =

Malaysian footballer

Amirul Asyraf
Personal information
- Full name: Amirul Asyraf bin Mohd Suhaidi
- Date of birth: 4 March 1994 (age 32)
- Place of birth: Penang, Malaysia
- Height: 1.71 m (5 ft 7 1/2 in)
- Position: Goalkeeper

Team information
- Current team: USM
- Number: 29

Youth career
- 2013–2016: UiTM FC

Senior career*
Years	Team	Apps	(Gls)
2016	UiTM FC	18	(0)
2017–2018	Penang	20	(0)
2025–	USM		
- * Club domestic league appearances and goals as of 27 July 2018

Amirul Asyraf bin Mohd Suhaidi (born 4 March 1994 in Penang) is a Malaysian professional football player who plays as a goalkeeper for Malaysia A2 Amateur League club USM.

== Honours ==
USM

- Malaysia A2 Amateur League: Runner-Up 2025–26
