= Elias Sulaiman =

Malaysian footballer

Personal information
- Full name: Elias bin Sulaiman
- Date of birth: 29 April 1986 (age 40)
- Place of birth: Penang, Malaysia
- Height: 1.63 m (5 ft 4 in)
- Position: Midfielder

Team information
- Current team: Sabah
- Number: 12

Senior career*
Years	Team	Apps	(Gls)
2010–2012	DRB-Hicom	32	(0)
2013–2014	USM FC	18	(0)
2015–2017	Penang	24	(4)
2018–2019	Sabah	1	(0)
- * Club domestic league appearances and goals as of 2 February 2018

Elias bin Sulaiman (born 29 April 1986) is a Malaysian professional football player who plays as a midfielder for Sabah in the Malaysia Premier League.

== Honours ==
=== Club ===
Sabah FA

- Malaysia Premier League (1): 2019
