= Fiwi Dwipan =

Indonesian footballer

Personal information
- Full name: Fiwi Dwipan Situmorang
- Date of birth: 14 December 1995 (age 30)
- Place of birth: Medan, Indonesia
- Height: 1.70 m (5 ft 7 in)
- Positions: Full-back; winger

Team information
- Current team: Persekabpas Pasuruan

Senior career*
| Years | Team | Apps | (Gls) |
| 2014–2015 | Pro Duta | 17 | (9) |
| 2016 | PSMS Medan | 12 | (3) |
| 2017 | PSPS Pekanbaru | 14 | (1) |
| 2018 | Persiraja Banda Aceh | 9 | (0) |
| 2019 | PSPS Riau | 4 | (0) |
| 2020–2021 | PSMS Medan | 12 | (2) |
| 2022 | Sriwijaya | 6 | (0) |
| 2023–2024 | Persekat Tegal | 11 | (0) |
| 2025–2026 | Sriwijaya | 16 | (0) |
| 2026– | Persekabpas Pasuruan | 0 | (0) |

International career
- Indonesia U17
- Indonesia U19
- * Club domestic league appearances and goals as of 19 June 2026

Fiwi Dwipan Situmorang (born 14 December 1995, in Medan) is an Indonesian professional footballer who plays as a full-back or winger for Liga Nusantara club Persekabpas Pasuruan. He is also a member of Indonesian Army.

== Club career ==
On 4 April 2014, he signed with Pro Duta. For 2017 season, he played for PSPS Pekanbaru, and made a debut on 24 July 2017, when PSPS Pekanbaru won 2–1 over 757 Kepri Jaya. In January 2018, Persiraja Banda Aceh signed him along with his teammate in PSPS Pekanbaru, Luis Irsandi.

== International career ==
At international level, he played for Indonesia U-17 and Indonesia U-19.
