= Yong Kuong Yong =

Malaysian footballer

Personal information
- Full name: Yong Kuong Yong (杨孔雍)
- Date of birth: 18 September 1988 (age 38)
- Place of birth: Port Dickson, Negeri Sembilan, Malaysia
- Height: 1.75 m (5 ft 9 in)
- Positions: Full back; centre back; central midfielder; striker

Team information
- Current team: CRC Penang
- Number: 6

Youth career
- 2006–2008: Kuala Lumpur U-21

Senior career*
Years	Team	Apps	(Gls)
2006	CRC Negeri Sembilan	8	(8)
2009–2011	Kuala Lumpur	61	(33)
2011–2012	FELDA United	22	(2)
2013	Perak TBG	21	(10)
2014–2015	Penang	41	(1)
2016	Terengganu	15	(0)
2017–2018	Penang	18	(0)
2019–	CRC Penang	5	(6)

International career^{‡}
2011–2012	Malaysia U-23	8	(1)
2010–2016	Malaysia	4	(0)
Medal record
Malaysia under-23
Sea Games
Gold medal – first place	Sea Games 2011	Football
- * Club domestic league appearances and goals as of 13 June 2019 ‡ National team caps and goals as of January 23, 2017

Yong Kuong Yong (born 18 September 1988 in Port Dickson) is a Malaysian footballer. He is currently playing for CRC Penang in FAP Division 1. He can play in a multitude of roles, including as a full back, centre back, central midfielder and occasionally as a striker.

== Career ==
Yong started his career playing for his hometown team Negeri Sembilan Chinese for the Malaysian Chinese Football Association (MFCA) League, under coach Christopher Khoo. He later leaves his hometown to Kuala Lumpur to play in Kuala Lumpur FA youth team, and was promoted to the senior team in 2009.

He transferred to Felda United FC for the 2012 season. On 10 January 2012, in his league debut for Felda United, he scored in a 2–0 victory over his former club, Kuala Lumpur FA. He scored his second goal in a 1–0 win over PBDKT T-Team FC on 30 June 2012.

Yong signed for Perak FA for the 2013 season.

In November 2013, Yong signed for Malaysia Premier League side, Penang FA.

== Career statistics ==
=== Club ===
As of 18 September 2018.

Appearances and goals by club, season and competition
Club	Season	League			Cup		League Cup		Continental		Total	
Club	Season	Division	Apps	Goals	Apps	Goals	Apps	Goals	Apps	Goals	Apps	Goals
Terengganu	2016	Malaysia Super League	15	0	1	0	0	0	–		16	0
Terengganu	Total		15	0	1	0	0	0	–		16	0
Penang	2017	Malaysia Super League	9	0	1	0	0	0	–		10	0
Penang	2018	Malaysia Premier League	9	0	1	0	5	0	–		15	0
Penang	Total		18	0	3	0	5	0	–		25	0
Career Total			33	0	3	0	5	0	–	–	41	0

=== International ===
As of 29 March 2016.

Appearances and goals by national team and year
National team	Year	Apps	Goals
Malaysia	2010	1	0
Malaysia	2011	2	0
Malaysia	2016	1	0
Total		4	0

== International career ==
He has been called up to Malaysia national football team in 2010 & 2015. He made his debut for Malaysia against Yemen on 27 February 2010.

Yong was also playing for the Malaysia U-23 team. He was called up to the SEA Games U-23 squad in October 2011 after impressive performance in Malaysia Cup. He made his first appearances against Nepal and manage to score one goal. Yong has also shown a tremendous performance on his first appearance in the SEA Games helping the Malaysia national team to wins 4–1 against Cambodia through one assist.

== Style of play ==
At the start of his career, Yong plays as a midfielder and occasionally as a striker at Kuala Lumpur, FELDA United and Perak. When he transferred to Penang, he was converted as centre-back by Coach K. Devan, due to his height, aggressiveness, speed and mainly lack of choice of centre back players in the squad at the time due to injuries. He adapted the position so well that he becomes the first choice centre-back for Penang.

In 2015 Malaysia Premier League, under coaching of Jacksen F. Tiago, Yong was converted to right-back. Due to his exceptional stamina, Yong is able to provide crosses upfield and defend effectively against an opponent's attack down the flanks. Which make him the most appearances player for Penang FA in 2015 and thus help the team to be promoted to 2016 Malaysia Super League.

== Honours ==
=== Club ===
CRC Negeri Sembilan

- MCFA Cup: 2006

Penang

- Malaysia Premier League: Promotion 2015

CRC Penang

- PCFA Cup: 2019
- Tanjong Cup: Runners-up 2019

=== International ===
Malaysia U23

- SEA Games: 2011
