= Darwira Sazan =

Malaysian footballer (born 1988)

Personal information
- Full name: Darwira bin Sazan
- Date of birth: 11 August 1988 (age 38)
- Place of birth: Perlis, Malaysia
- Height: 1.81 m (5 ft 11 1/2 in)
- Position: Defender

Team information
- Current team: Sabah
- Number: 3

Youth career
- 2010–2012: USM

Senior career*
Years	Team	Apps	(Gls)
2012–2014	USM	52	(0)
2015–2017	Penang	19	(2)
2018	Sabah	0	(0)
- * Club domestic league appearances and goals as of 17 July 2017

Darwira bin Sazan (born 11 August 1988) is a Malaysian professional football player who plays as a defender for Sabah in the Malaysia Premier League.
