= Mohd Syukur Saidin =

Malaysian footballer

Syukur Saidin
Personal information
- Full name: Mohammad Syukur bin Saidin
- Date of birth: 12 November 1991 (age 35)
- Place of birth: Penang, Malaysia
- Height: 1.70 m (5 ft 7 in)
- Position: Midfielder

Team information
- Current team: USM
- Number: 7

Youth career
- 2009–2010: Sime Darby

Senior career*
Years	Team	Apps	(Gls)
2011–2014	Sime Darby	11	(3)
2015–2018	Penang	45	(1)
2019	Perlis	0	(0)
2019–2020	Penang	7	(0)
2023-2025	Bukit Tambun		
2025–	USM		
- * Club domestic league appearances and goals as of October 30, 2020 ‡ National team caps and goals as of January 23, 2017

Mohd Syukur Saidin (born 12 November 1991) is a Malaysian footballer who plays as a midfielder for Malaysia A2 Amateur League club USM.

== Career ==
Syukur started his football career with Sime Darby Presidents Cup Team. He was promoted to the senior team in 2011 and still plays with them, as of May 2014.

== Personal life ==
Amer Saidin, his youngest brother also a professional footballer.

== Honours ==
Penang FA

- Malaysia Premier League: 2020
- Malaysia Premier League: Promotion 2015

USM

- Malaysia A2 Amateur League: Runner-Up 2025–26
