= Zharif Hasna =

Malaysian footballer

Mohd Zharif Hasna
Personal information
- Full name: Mohd Zharif bin Hasna
- Date of birth: 9 December 1986 (age 39)
- Place of birth: Terengganu, Malaysia
- Height: 1.70 m (5 ft 7 in)
- Position: Midfielder

Team information
- Current team: Penang FA
- Number: 7

Youth career
- 2005–2007: Terengganu FA

Senior career*
Years	Team	Apps	(Gls)
2011	Terengganu FA	7	(0)
2012–2013	T-Team F.C.	14	(4)
2014–	Penang FA	17	(5)
- * Club domestic league appearances and goals as of 2 August 2014 ‡ National team caps and goals as of 2 August 2014

Mohd Zharif Hasna (born 9 December 1986) is a Malaysian footballer who plays as a striker for Penang FA.

He started his footballing career with Terengganu FA. A year later, he moved to another team in Terengganu with T-Team F.C., before joining Penang FA in 2013.
