= Reinaldo Lobo =

Brazilian footballer (born 1988)

Personal information
- Full name: Reinaldo Rodrigues de Oliveira Lobo
- Date of birth: 5 April 1988 (age 38)
- Place of birth: Cataguases, Brazil
- Height: 1.86 m (6 ft 1 in)
- Position: Centre-back

Team information
- Current team: Altos

Senior career*
Years	Team	Apps	(Gls)
2008	Figueirense	0	(0)
2009	Itaúna		
2009	Contagem		
2010	Itabuna	7	(0)
2011	Itaúna		
2011	Paços de Ferreira	0	(0)
2012	Oliveirense	3	(0)
2013	Novorizontino	7	(0)
2014	PS Mitra Kukar	24	(3)
2015–2017	Penang	33	(5)
2018	PSMS Medan	27	(3)
2020–	Altos	6	(0)
- * Club domestic league appearances and goals as of 10:52, 17 October 2020 (UTC)

Reinaldo Rodrigues de Oliveira Lobo (born 5 April 1988) known as Reinaldo Lobo is a Brazilian professional footballer who currently plays as a centre back for Altos.

== Honours ==
=== Club ===
Penang

- Malaysia Premier League: Promotion 2015
