= Mohd Redzuan Suhaidi =

Malaysian footballer (born 1995)

Redzuan Suhaidi
Personal information
- Full name: Mohd Redzuan bin Suhaidi
- Date of birth: 6 October 1995 (age 31)
- Place of birth: Penang, Malaysia
- Height: 1.65 m (5 ft 5 in)
- Position: Defensive midfielder

Team information
- Current team: USM
- Number: 19

Youth career
- 2015: Penang U-21

Senior career*
Years	Team	Apps	(Gls)
2015–2018	Penang	29	(0)
2020–2024	Langkawi City	2	(0)
2025–	USM		
- * Club domestic league appearances and goals

Mohd Redzuan Suhaidi (born 6 October 1995) is a Malaysian professional footballer who plays as a defensive midfielder for USM.

== Career ==
=== Penang FA ===
Mohd Redzuan Suhaidi is a first team player for Penang FA squad in 2015. In October 2015, Redzuan has been called up by coach Ong Kim Swee to face Palestine and UAE in 2018 World Cup Qualifiers but not play both games.

== Honours ==
USM

- Malaysia A2 Amateur League: Runner-Up 2025–26
