= Penang State Stadium =

Stadium in Seberang Perai, Penang, Malaysia

Coordinates: 5°15′39″N 100°26′15″E

State of Penang Stadium
- Stadium Negeri Pulau Pinang 槟州体育场 பினாங்கு மாநில விளையாட்டரங்கம்
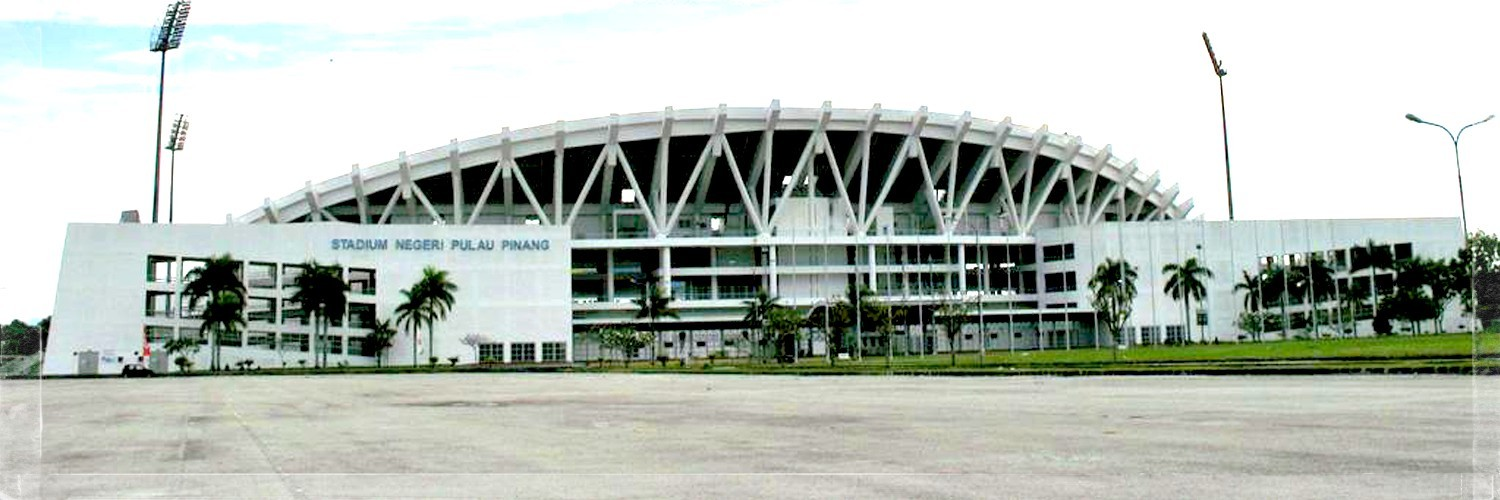
- Interactive map of State of Penang Stadium
- Location: Batu Kawan, South Seberang Perai, Penang, Malaysia
- Owner: Penang Development Corporation
- Operator: Penang State Sports Council
- Capacity: 40,000
- Surface: Grass
- Scoreboard: Yes
- Field size: 120m x 70m

Construction
- Opened: 2000
- Cost: RM 104 million

Tenants
- Immigration FC (2025–2026); Penang FC (2001–present); SDMS Kepala Batas (formerly); Bukit Tambun; PBAPP (formerly)

State of Penang Stadium (Malay: Stadium Negeri Pulau Pinang), also known as Batu Kawan Stadium, is a multi-purpose stadium in Batu Kawan, South Seberang Perai, Penang, Malaysia. It is used mostly for football matches. The stadium has a capacity of 40,000 people. It was built in 2000 for the 8th Sukma Games. In 2007, the stadium hosted the Malaysian FA Cup final. The match was won by Kedah Darul Aman 4–2 on penalty shoot-out.

== See also ==
- City Stadium
- List of stadiums in Malaysia
