= USM F.C. =

Malaysian football club

USM
- Full name: Kelab Bolasepak Universiti Sains Malaysia
- Nickname: University Tigers
- Founded: 2008; 18 years ago
- Ground: USM Athletics Stadium
- Capacity: 1,000
- Owner: Universiti Sains Malaysia
- Head coach: Azizul Ahmad Sabri
- League: Malaysia A1 Semi-Pro League
- 2025–26: Malaysia A2 Amateur League, runners-up (promoted)
- Website: USM FC
Home colours	Away colours

Kelab Bolasepak Universiti Sains Malaysia (University of Science Malaysia Football Club), simply known as USM FC, is a Malaysian football club currently competing in the Malaysia A1 Semi-Pro League. It is under the jurisdiction of the Universiti Sains Malaysia, a public university based in Georgetown, Penang.

== History ==
USM FC was selected to the 2010 Malaysia Premier League based on the team's performance in the FAM Cup 2009, where they finished third in the league. In the 2010 Malaysia Premier League, KBSUSM was officially named as Pulau Pinang, Kepala Batas, Staf USM. For the 2011 Malaysia Premier League, they were named as Pulau Pinang, Kelab Bolasepak USM. They pulled out of the 2013 Malaysia Premier League, despite finishing the previous season in sixth place. The club's management cited financial difficulties for the decision.

In 2025, after being absent for several years, USM FC was invited to join the 2025–26 Malaysia A2 Amateur League, the third-tier competition organised by the Amateur Football League (AFL). On 10 January 2026, USM FC secured promotion to the Malaysia A1 Semi-Pro League for the first time in their history, after defeating AAK Puncak Alam.

== Players ==
=== Current squad ===
As of September 2026

Note: Flags indicate national team as defined under FIFA eligibility rules; some limited exceptions apply. Players may hold more than one non-FIFA nationality.

No.	Pos.	Nation	Player
1	GK	MAS	Muhammad Azam Ramli^{U22}
2	DF	GAM	Ahmad K. Saidy
3	DF	MAS	Farheem Nur Iman
4	MF	MAS	Shukor Azmi
5	DF	MAS	Danial Hakim Mansor
6	DF	MAS	Harzanhafiz Hazlizanizan
7	MF	MAS	Aizat Safuan
8	MF	MAS	Syahmi Syakir Salim
9	FW	MAS	Fauzi Abdul Kadar
10	MF	MAS	Mu'az Zainal Abidin
11	MF	MAS	Akmal Mohd Noor
12	DF	MAS	Nabil Nizam
14	DF	MAS	Effizul Haikal^{U22}
15	MF	MAS	Nabil Adam Abdul Aziz^{U22}

No.	Pos.	Nation	Player
17	FW	MAS	Aiman Fitrie Ismail^{U22}
18	FW	MAS	Saif Adam Iskandar^{U22}
19	DF	MAS	Mohd Redzuan Suhaidi (captain)
20	MF	MAS	Daniel Irfan Mohd Nadzri
21	GK	MAS	Hazrull Hafiz
22	FW	MAS	Fakrullah Syarafuddin^{U22}
23	MF	MAS	Naufal Akif Aswat
24	MF	MAS	Amirul Aiman Nasaruddin
25	MF	MAS	Mustaqim Abdullah^{U22}
26	DF	MAS	Norasyraf Aiman
27	FW	GAM	Musa J. Camara
28	MF	MAS	Faiezzul Fahmy
29	DF	MAS	Izzul Adham Suhaimi
30	GK	MAS	Asfa Mohd Abiddin

== Management ==
As of August 2026

Position	Name
Team manager	(Malaysia) Encik Mohd Azizudin Mohd Shariff
Assistant team manager	(Malaysia) Mohammad Fadzli Rosli (Malaysia) Erman Kamal Mustafa Kamal
Head coach	(Malaysia) Azizul Ahmad Sabri
Assistant coach	(Malaysia) Zabidi Hassan
Goalkeeper coach	(Malaysia) Mohd Kalnur Mohd Nor
Fitness coach	(Malaysia) Mohd Hafezi Mat Zain
Team doctor	(Malaysia) Ahmad Zaimi Abdul Latiff
Physio	(Malaysia) Muhammad Akasyah Baharum (Malaysia) Muhamad 'Izzul Na'im
Team staff	(Malaysia) Amirul Asyraf Suhaidi (Malaysia) Muhammad Irfan Razman
Team media	(Malaysia) Muhamad Sidek Karim (Malaysia) Mahadzeer Mokhtar
Kitman	(Malaysia) Muhammad Hafiz Ismail (Malaysia) Muhammad Adam Muiz Musa

== Season by season record ==
Year	Position	League	Malaysia FA Cup	Malaysia Cup/Malaysia Challenge Cup	Top scorer (league)
2008	1st	Penang League	Not participating	Not participating	
2009	3rd	FAM Cup	Not participating	Not participating	
2010	9th	Malaysia Premier League	First round	Not qualified	
2011	6th	Malaysia Premier League	First round	Not qualified	
2012	6th	Malaysia Premier League	Round of 16	Not qualified	
2025–26	Runner-Up	Malaysia A2 Amateur League	Not participating	Not participating	(Malaysia) Aidil Danial Izhar (7 goals)

Champions	Runners-up	Third place	Promoted	Relegated

== Honours ==
=== League ===
- Division 3/A2 Amateur League
  - Runners-up (1): 2025–26
- Division 3/FAM League
  - Third place (1): 2009
- Division 4/FAP League Division 1
  - Champions (2): 2008, 2025–26
