= Mazlizam Mohamad =

Malaysian footballer

Personal information
- Full name: Mazlizam bin Mohamad
- Date of birth: 19 September 1986 (age 40)
- Place of birth: Perlis, Malaysia
- Height: 1.72 m (5 ft 7 1/2 in)
- Position: Defender

Team information
- Current team: Perlis FA
- Number: 13

Senior career*
Years	Team	Apps	(Gls)
2006–2010	Perlis	56	(4)
2011–2012	Terengganu	42	(3)
2013	T-Team	36	(2)
2014	Terengganu	15	(0)
2015–2016	Penang	40	(0)
2017–	Perlis	12	(0)

International career^{‡}
2009	Malaysia	1	(0)
Medal record
Men's football
Representing Malaysia
Malaysia U23
SEA Games
First place	2009 Vientiane	Football
- * Club domestic league appearances and goals as of 26 September 2017 ‡ National team caps and goals as of 26 April 2012

Mazlizam Mohamad (born 19 September 1986) is a Malaysian footballer who plays as a defender for Perlis FA in the Malaysia Premier League.

He was a member of the Malaysia national under-23 football team and a member of the 2009 Laos Sea Games Football Gold medal-winning squad. He has played for the Malaysian national football team, and in summer 2009 he played twice against Manchester United in their pre season tour of the Far East.

His first cap for Malaysia came in a friendly match against India on 13 November 2011.

== Honours ==
- 2009 SEA Games: (gold) 2009
