= 2024–25 Penang F.C. season =

Penang
2024–25 season
- Chairman: Daniel Gooi
- Head coach: Akmal Rizal (until 25 October 2024); Mat Saiful Mohd (caretaker, from 25 October 2024 until 14 November 2024); Wan Rohaimi (from 14 November 2024)
- Stadium: City Stadium
- Super League: 10th
- Malaysia FA Cup: Quarter-finals
- Malaysia Cup: Round of 16
- MFL Challenge Cup: Semi-finals
- Top goalscorer: League: Rodrigo Dias (10); All: Rodrigo Dias (11)
- Highest home attendance: 8,122 vs Kedah, Super League, 22 June 2024
- Lowest home attendance: 354 vs PT Athletic, MFL Challenge Cup, 23 December 2024
- Average home league attendance: 2153
- Biggest win: 6–1 vs KDN, Super League, 7 February 2025
- Biggest defeat: 0–5 vs JDT, Super League, 12 September 2024
Home colours	Away colours	Third colours

The 2024–25 season was Penang's 98th competitive season, 4th season in the first tier of Malaysian football since promoted in 2020, 103rd year in existence as a football club, and the 4th year since rebranded as Penang Football Club. The season covers the period from 10 May 2024 to 27 April 2025.

== Coaching Staffs ==
Position	Name
Technical director	(Morocco) Merzagua Abderrazak
Head Coach	(Malaysia) Wan Rohaimi
Assistant Head Coach	(Malaysia) Mat Saiful Mohd
Assistant Coach	(Malaysia) Rafiz Abu Bakar
Goalkeeping Coach	(Malaysia) Mohd Hisham Jainudin
Fitness Coach	(Malaysia) Rozy Abdul Majid
Team Doctor	(Malaysia) Hardeep Singh Jaginder Singh (Malaysia) Parmjit Singh Kuldip Singh
Physiotherapist	(Malaysia) Ridhwan Noor Akmal
Team Analyst	(Malaysia) Anwar Azahari
Masseur	(Malaysia) Megat Loutifie
Kit Man	(Malaysia) Sufie Noorazizan
U-23 Team Manager	(Malaysia) Razif Radali
U-23 Head Coach	(Malaysia) Manzoor Azwira
U-23 Assistant Head Coach	(Malaysia) Farkhis Fisol
U-23 Goalkeeping Coach	(Malaysia) Azmirulkifli Haji Mohd Isa
U-23 Fitness Coach	(Malaysia) Rozy Abdul Majid
U-23 Team Doctor	(Malaysia) Azry Azmi
U-23 Physiotherapist	(Malaysia) Amirul Ehsan Mahrim
U-23 Security Officer	(Malaysia) Esa Alwi
U-23 Media Officer	(Malaysia) Zachki Suri
U-23 Kit Man	(Malaysia) Hafiz Ismail
U-21 Team Head Coach	(Malaysia) Rahim Hassan
U-19 Team Head Coach	(Malaysia) Zabidi Hassan

== Players ==
=== First-team squad ===
As of 12 February 2025

No.	Player	Position	Nationality	Date of birth (age)	Signed from	Date signed	Fee
Goalkeepers
1	Haziq Mukriz	GK	(Malaysia)	19 April 2003 (age 23)	Academy (Note: Promoted from U23)	19 February 2024	Free
23	Sikh Izhan	GK	(Malaysia)	23 March 2003 (age 23)	Selangor	22 February 2024	Loan
25	Shafiq Afifi	GK	(Malaysia)	6 August 1999 (age 27)	Perak II	19 December 2020	Free
Defenders
3	Aikmal Roslan	DF	(Malaysia)	11 February 2001 (age 25)	Academy	19 February 2024	Free
4	Richmond Ankrah	DF	(Ghana)	22 February 2000 (age 26)	Selangor	27 March 2024	Loan
6	Khairul Akmal	DF	(Malaysia)	28 May 1998 (age 28)	Academy	1 January 2017	Free
15	Fairuz Zakaria	DF	(Malaysia)	25 May 1997 (age 29)	Kedah	19 December 2021	Free
17	Rafael Vitor	DF	(Brazil)	5 January 1993 (age 33)	Nacional	11 January 2020	Free
26	Namathevan Arunasalam	DF	(Malaysia)	26 July 1996 (age 30)	Negeri Sembilan	29 December 2022	Free
32	Aqil Irfanuddin	DF	(Malaysia)	3 April 1997 (age 29)	Terengganu II	22 February 2024	Loan
37	Azmeer Aris	DF	(Malaysia)	5 August 1999 (age 27)	Kedah	14 December 2022	Free
46	Adib Raop	DF	(Malaysia)	25 October 1999 (age 27)	Perak	17 December 2021	Free
50	Zarif Syamil Zamani	DF	(Malaysia)	11 December 2002 (age 23)	Academy	1 November 2024	Free
72	Nabil Nizam	DF	(Malaysia)	26 February 2001 (age 25)	Academy	1 November 2024	Free
Midfielders
8	Khairu Azrin	MF	(Malaysia)	13 July 1991 (age 35)	Kelantan United	22 February 2024	Free
10	Neto Olivera	MF	(Brazil)	20 April 1998 (age 28)	Trem	27 April 2024	Free
11	Amer Azahar	MF	(Malaysia)	22 June 1995 (age 31)	Kedah	17 December 2022	Free
12	Al-Hafiz Harun	MF	(Malaysia)	13 September 1994 (age 32)	Kedah	20 February 2024	Free
14	Syamer Kutty Abba	MF	(Malaysia)	1 October 1997 (age 29)	Johor Darul Ta'zim	12 April 2024	Loan
20	Rahmat Makasuf	MF	(Malaysia)	28 September 1997 (age 29)	Terengganu	22 February 2024	Free
21	Shafi Azswad	MF	(Malaysia)	9 March 2001 (age 25)	Academy	20 February 2024	Free
28	Azrie Reza	MF	(Malaysia)	30 December 1997 (age 28)	PDRM	7 February 2023	Free
33	Nik Akif	MF	(Malaysia)	11 May 1999 (age 27)	Terengganu	16 December 2022	Free
71	Haziq Kutty Abba	MF	(Malaysia)	28 September 2004 (age 22)	Academy	12 January 2025	Free
80	Izzat Zikri	MF	(Malaysia)	17 January 2001 (age 25)	Academy	20 February 2024	Free
88	Daniel Irfan	MF	(Malaysia)	30 September 2001 (age 25)	Academy	19 February 2024	Free
Forwards
7	Dylan Wenzel-Halls	FW	(Australia)	15 December 1997 (age 28)	Central Coast Mariners	2 September 2024	Free
9	Rodrigo Dias	FW	(Brazil)	26 January 1994 (age 32)	Khaitan	5 March 2024	Free
30	Nabil Latpi	FW	(Malaysia)	6 September 1992 (age 34)	PDRM	22 February 2024	Free
55	Aidil Danial Izhar	FW	(Malaysia)	23 September 2001 (age 25)	Academy	12 September 2024	Free
97	Idrzuwan Daud	FW	(Malaysia)	15 April 2001 (age 25)	Academy	18 December 2024	Free
98	Akid Zamri	FW	(Malaysia)	13 February 2005 (age 21)	Academy	25 January 2025	Free
99	Alif Ikmalrizal	FW	(Malaysia)	9 December 2002 (age 23)	Academy	19 February 2024	Free
Out on loan
18	Iman Rafaei	DF	(Malaysia)	1 May 2001 (age 25)	Academy	19 February 2024	Free
83	Khairil Anuar	MF	(Malaysia)	8 March 1995 (age 31)	Kelantan	22 February 2024	Free

== Transfers and contracts ==
=== In ===
==== 1st Transfer Window ====
No.	Pos.	Name	Moving from	Type	Transfer Date	Transfer fee	
19	MF	Al-Hafiz Harun	Kedah	Transfer	20 February 2024	Free	
20	MF	Rahmat Makasuf	Terengganu	Transfer	22 February 2024	Free	
83	MF	Khairil Anuar	Kelantan	Transfer	22 February 2024	Free	
30	FW	Nabil Latpi	PDRM	Transfer	22 February 2024	Free	
8	MF	Khairu Azrin	Kelantan United	Transfer	22 February 2024	Free	
32	DF	Aqil Irfanuddin	Terengganu II	Loan	22 February 2024	Free	
13	MF	Muhaimin Izuddin	Kelantan	Transfer	22 February 2024	Free	
23	GK	Sikh Izhan	Selangor	Loan	22 February 2024	Free	
9	FW	Rodrigo Dias	Khaitan	Transfer	5 March 2024	Free	
4	DF	Richmond Ankrah	Selangor	Loan	27 March 2024	Free	
14	MF	Syamer Kutty Abba	Johor Darul Ta'zim	Loan	12 April 2024	Free	
10	MF	Neto Olivera	Trem	Transfer	27 April 2024	Free	-

==== 2nd Transfer Window ====
No.	Pos.	Name	Moving from	Type	Transfer Date	Transfer fee
7	FW	Dylan Wenzel-Halls	Central Coast Mariners	Transfer	2 September 2024	Free

=== Released ===
No.	Pos.	Name	To	Type	Transfer Date	Transfer fee
8	MF	Asnan Ahmad	Sri Pahang FC	Transfer	21 February 2024	Free
13	MF	Muhaimin Izuddin	Free agent	Mutual consent	4 September 2024	Free

=== Loan Out ===
No.	Pos.	Name	To	Type	Transfer Date	Transfer fee
83	MF	Khairil Anuar	Gombak	Loan	4 September 2024	Free
18	DF	Iman Rafaei	Bukit Tambun	Loan	9 September 2024	Free

== Friendlies ==
5 April 2024 Friendly	Perak	0–0	Penang	Batu Kawan, Perak
22:00 UTC+8				Stadium: Stadium Perak

17 April 2024 Friendly	Terengganu FC	1–0	Penang	Kuala Nerus, Terengganu
21:00 UTC+8	Ismahil 69'			Stadium: Sultan Mizan Zainal Abidin Stadium

19 April 2024 Friendly	Terengganu II	4–2	Penang	Kuala Terengganu, Terengganu
21:00 UTC+8	Khalaif 41'; Ahmad 45'; Chukwu 58'; Daniel 60'		Syamer 51' (pen.); Nabil 62'	Stadium: Sultan Ismail Nasiruddin Shah Stadium

21 April 2024 Friendly	Kedah Darul Aman	0–3	Penang	Kuala Terengganu, Terengganu
21:00 UTC+8			Syamer 32'; Rodrigo 44'; Rahmat 61'	Stadium: Sultan Ismail Nasiruddin Shah Stadium

30 April 2024 Friendly	Kedah	3–1	Penang	Alor Setar, Kedah
21:00 UTC+8	Habib 26'; Miloš 51' (pen.), 67'		Richmond 14'	Stadium: Darul Aman Stadium

4 May 2024 Friendly	Penang	1–2	Perak	Georgetown, Penang
20:15 UTC+8	Rafael 62'		Firdaus 35'; Clayton 83'	Stadium: City Stadium

== Competitions ==
=== Malaysia Super League ===
==== League table ====
Pos	Team	Pld	W	D	L	GF	GA	GD	Pts	Qualification or relegation
8	Sri Pahang	24	7	8	9	35	39	−4	29	Withdrawn from Super League (Note: Perak and Sri Pahang withdrew at end of season and dissolved. Not applying for a national licence.)
9	PDRM	24	7	6	11	24	35	−11	27	
10	Penang	24	6	8	10	31	38	−7	26	
11	Kedah Darul Aman (Note: MFL officially snubs Kedah Darul Aman club licensing approval.)	24	6	6	12	21	51	−30	21 (Note: On 5 April 2024, Kedah Darul Aman were deducted three points for failing to pay players and staff on time following previous MFL rules breaches in the 2023 season.)	Ejected from Super League and relegated to A1 Semi-Pro League
12	Negeri Sembilan	24	4	4	16	23	49	−26	16	

Source: MFL
Rules for classification: 1) Points; 2) Goal difference; 3) Goals scored;

==== Result summary ====
Overall								Home						Away					
Pld	W	D	L	GF	GA	GD	Pts	W	D	L	GF	GA	GD	W	D	L	GF	GA	GD
24	6	8	10	31	38	−7	26	3	5	4	13	16	−3	3	3	6	18	22	−4

Last updated: 21 April 2025.
Source: MFL

==== Results by matchday ====
Matchday	1	2	3	4	5	6	7	8	9	10	11	12	13	14	15	16	17	18	19	20	21	22	23	24
Ground	A	H	A	H	A	A	H	A	A	H	A	H	H	A	H	A	H	H	A					
Result	D	D	D	L	W	L	W	D	L	D	L	L	L	L	W	L	D	D	W	D	L	W	W	L
Position	6	7	7	9	7	9	7	7	6	8	9	11	11	11	10	11	10	10	9	8	9	10	10	10

Updated to match(es) played on 3 June 2025. Source: MFL
A = Away; H = Home; W = Win; D = Draw; L = Loss

==== Matches ====
Win Draw Loss

12 May 2024 1	Sabah	0–0	Penang	Kota Kinabalu, Sabah
17:45 UTC+8	Jafri (yellow card) 88'	Report	Rahmat (yellow card) 90'	Stadium: Likas Stadium; Attendance: 3,708; Referee: Zamzaidi Katimin

19 May 2024 2	Penang	0–0	Terengganu	Georgetown, Penang
20:15 UTC+8	Khairu (yellow card) 45+2'; Rahmat (yellow card) 72'	Report	Shahrul (yellow card) 25'; Faris (yellow card) 68'; Hakim (yellow card) 90+2'	Stadium: City Stadium; Attendance: 4,557; Referee: S. Logeswaran

25 May 2024 3	PDRM	1–1	Penang	Petaling Jaya, Selangor
21:00 UTC+8	Prince (yellow card) 22'; Ifedayo 32'; Aliff (yellow card) 65'; Fakhrul (yellow card) 71'	Report	Rodrigo 52'; Neto (yellow card) 82'; Nik Akif (yellow card) 90+8'	Stadium: Petaling Jaya Stadium; Attendance: 631; Referee: Mohd Nafeez Abd Wahab

22 June 2024 4	Penang	0–1	Kedah	Georgetown, Penang
21:00 UTC+8	Nabil (yellow card) 29'; Syamer (yellow card) 49'	Report	Sony (yellow card) 34'; Ebenezer 77'	Stadium: City Stadium; Attendance: 8,122; Referee: Faizudin Ismail

13 July 2024 5	Perak	0–2	Penang	Ipoh, Perak
21:00 UTC+8	Sunday (yellow card) 14'; Luiz (yellow card) 45+2'	Report	Neto (yellow card) 1', (goal) 45+3'; Adib (yellow card) 42'; Alif 90+7'	Stadium: Perak Stadium; Attendance: 5,582; Referee: Zamzaidi Katimin

27 July 2024 6	Selangor	4–1	Penang	Petaling Jaya, Selangor
20:15 UTC+8	Mukhairi 3'; Safuwan (yellow card) 61'; Yohandry 70'; Alvin 89'; Quentin 90+9'	Report	Namathevan (yellow card) 30'; Rafael 64' (pen.), (yellow card) 88'	Stadium: Petaling Jaya Stadium; Attendance: 8,965; Referee: Ahmad Zuhadi Dzulkifli

1 August 2024 7	Penang	3–0	KDN	Georgetown, Penang
21:00 UTC+8	Rodrigo 12'; Nik Akif 34'; Rafael 75' (pen.)	Report	Michal (yellow card) 39'; Fahrurrozi (yellow card) 61'	Stadium: City Stadium; Attendance: 1,543; Referee: S. Logeswaran

11 August 2024 8	Kuching City	2–2	Penang	Kuching, Sarawak
16:45 UTC+8	James (yellow card) 25'; Filemon (yellow card) 40'; Zahrul 70'; Tchétché 78'	Report	Rafael (yellow card) 25'; Neto 37'; Rodrigo 41'; Alif (yellow card) 90+4'	Stadium: Sarawak Stadium; Attendance: 2,407; Referee: Khairulsyahmi Khalidi

12 September 2024 9	Johor	5–0	Penang	Iskandar Puteri, Johor
20:15 UTC+8	Óscar 3'; Jorge 41', 49'; Bérgson 66' (pen.); Arif Aiman 90+4' (pen.)	Report	Rafael (yellow card) 45+3'; Alif (yellow card) 79'	Stadium: Sultan Ibrahim Stadium; Attendance: 13,975; Referee: Razlan Joffri Ali

22 September 2024 10	Penang	2–2	Negeri Sembilan	Georgetown, Penang
17:30 UTC+8	Rodrigo 14'; Dylan 16'; Fairuz (yellow card) 40'; Khairu (yellow card) 62'; Alif (yellow card) 89'	Report	Hadin 1'; Harith (yellow card) 20'; Sebastian 45+3'; Norfiqrie (yellow card) 72'; Aroon Kumar (yellow card) 87'	Stadium: City Stadium; Attendance: 1,492; Referee: Faizudin Ismail

29 September 2024 11	Kuala Lumpur City	4–2	Penang	Cheras, Kuala Lumpur
17:30 UTC+8	Paulo 3'; Jovan 22', (yellow card) 29'; Zhafri (yellow card) 28'; Kenny (yellow card) 36'; Haqimi 54', 74'; Giancarlo (yellow card) 73'	Report	Adib 3'; Izzat (yellow card) 45+3'; Fairuz (yellow card) 67'; Namathevan (yellow card) 84'; Rodrigo 82'	Stadium: Kuala Lumpur Stadium; Attendance: 1,017; Referee: Zamzaidi Katimin

20 October 2024 12	Penang	0–1	Sri Pahang	Georgetown, Penang
20:15 UTC+8	Adib (yellow card) 55'; Khairul (yellow card) 68'	Report	Agüero (yellow card) 25'; Mykola 45+1'; Hidalgo (yellow card) 90+3'	Stadium: City Stadium; Attendance: 1,104; Referee: Munir Izam

25 October 2024 13	Penang	0–4	Sabah	Georgetown, Penang
20:15 UTC+8	Fairuz (yellow card) 20'; Richmond (yellow card) 31'; Adib (yellow card) 69'	Report	Saddil 2'; Gabriel 6'; Stuart 35'; Dominic 50'; Damien (yellow card) 77'	Stadium: City Stadium; Attendance: 1,187; Referee: Zamzaidi Katimin

1 November 2024 14	Terengganu	1–0	Penang	Kuala Nerus, Terengganu
21:00 UTC+8	Ubaidullah 27'; Akram (yellow card) 55'	Report	Khairul (yellow card) 17'; Al-Hafiz (yellow card) 53'	Stadium: Sultan Mizan Zainal Abidin Stadium; Attendance: 3,211; Referee: Suhaizi Shukri

4 December 2024 15	Penang	2–0	PDRM	Georgetown, Penang
21:00 UTC+8	Rafael (yellow card) 30'; Rodrigo 38'; Syamer (yellow card) 45'; Nik Akif 55'; Izzat (yellow card) 73'; Sikh Izhan (yellow card) 82'; Alif (yellow card) 87'	Report	Amir (red card) 11'	Stadium: City Stadium; Attendance: 448; Referee: Shukor Zulkiflee

18 December 2024 16	Kedah	1–0	Penang	Alor Setar, Kedah
21:00 UTC+8	Sukhrob 10'; Kamil (yellow card) 81'; Rizal (yellow card) 85'; Wan Amirul Afiq (yellow card) 90'	Report	Khairu (yellow card) 51'; Azmeer (yellow card) 90+2'; Dylan (yellow card) 90+5'	Stadium: Darul Aman Stadium; Attendance: 1,565; Referee: Khairulsyahmi Khalidi

12 January 2025 17	Penang	3–3	Perak	Georgetown, Penang
20:15 UTC+8	Dylan 13', 17', 33'; Haziq (yellow card) 45+3'; Adib (yellow card) 72'	Report	Luciano 22'; Fadhli (yellow card) 25'; Clayton 61' (pen.); Adilet 67'	Stadium: City Stadium; Attendance: 2,002; Referee: Shukor Zulkiflee

25 January 2025 18	Penang	1–1	Selangor	Georgetown, Penang
20:15 UTC+8	Syamer (yellow card) 48'; Rafael 90+6' (pen.)	Report	Ronnie 10', (yellow card) 88'; Alvin (yellow card) 50'; Ali Olwan (yellow card) 73'; Nikola (yellow card) 81'	Stadium: City Stadium; Attendance: 2,198; Referee: Suhaizi Shukri

7 February 2025 19	KDN	1–6	Penang	Kota Bahru, Kelantan
21:00 UTC+8	Adam (yellow card) 23'; Syahir 34'	Report	Rodrigo 29', 67', 83' (pen.), 90+5'; Nik Akif 43'; Khairul (yellow card) 56'; Dylan 90+2'	Stadium: Sultan Muhammad IV Stadium; Attendance: 265; Referee: Amirul Izwan Yaacob

16 February 2025 20	Penang	1–1	Kuching City	Georgetown, Penang
21:00 UTC+8	Neto (yellow card) 71'; Alif 86', (yellow card) 87'	Report	Jordan 74'; Rodney (yellow card) 89'; Jimmy (yellow card) 90+4'	Stadium: City Stadium; Attendance: 933; Referee: Shukor Zulkiflee

16 March 2025 21	Penang	0–3	Johor	Georgetown, Penang
22:00 UTC+8	Richmond (yellow card) 67'	Report	Eddy 20', 27'; Heberty 54'; Matthew (yellow card) 76'; Shahrul (yellow card) 78'; Muñiz (yellow card) 81'	Stadium: City Stadium; Attendance: 2,246; Referee: Suhaizi Shukri

5 April 2025 22	Negeri Sembilan	2–0	Penang	Paroi, Negeri Sembilan
21:00 UTC+8	Aqil (yellow card) 85'; Hariz (yellow card) 89'	Report	Nik Akif (yellow card) 8'; Rahmat 13'; Syamer (yellow card) 31'; Haziq (yellow card) 66' (yellow-red card) 90+7'; Rafael 87' (pen.)	Stadium: Tuanku Abdul Rahman Stadium; Attendance: 389; Referee: S. Logeswaran

13 April 2025 23	Penang	1–0	Kuala Lumpur City	Georgetown, Penang
20:15 UTC+8	Alif 27'; Richmond (yellow card) 40'; Rafael (yellow card) 42'; Adib (yellow card) 74'; Neto (yellow card) 80'; Akid (yellow card) 90+3'; Sikh (yellow card) 90+8'	Report	Patrick (yellow card) 26'; Adrijan (yellow card) 41' (yellow-red card) 90+3'; Kenny (yellow card) 42'	Stadium: City Stadium; Attendance: 953; Referee: Mohd Nafeez Abd Wahab

19 April 2025 24	Sri Pahang	3–2	Penang	Temerloh, Pahang
20:15 UTC+8	Mykola 18', 87'; Baqiuddin (yellow card) 43'; Syazwan 57'	Report	Adib (yellow card) 40'; Alif 48'; Rahmat (yellow card) 53'; Nik Akif (yellow card) 55'; Stefano 64' (o.g.); Khairul (yellow card) 69'	Stadium: Temerloh Mini Stadium; Attendance: 633; Referee: Izzul Fikri Kamaruzaman

=== Malaysia FA Cup ===
14 June 2024 Round of 16	Sri Pahang	1–1 (3–4 p)	Penang	Temerloh, Pahang
20:15 UTC+8	Kpah (yellow card) 18'; Mykola 79'; Hidalgo (yellow card) 103'	Report	Nabil 41'; Syamer (yellow card) 45+2'; Khairu (yellow card) 55'; Neto (yellow card) 76'; Adib (yellow card) 117'	Stadium: Temerloh Mini Stadium; Attendance: 4,480; Referee: Hasrol Amir
	Penalties
	Hidalgo (penalty scored); Mykola (penalty missed); Agüero (penalty scored); Aleksandar (penalty scored); Fadhli (penalty missed)		Rafael (penalty scored); Syamer (penalty scored); Adib (penalty scored); Shafi (penalty missed); Nabil (penalty scored)

28 June 2024 Quarter-finals 1st leg	Penang	0–1	Kedah	Georgetown, Penang
20:15 UTC+8	Khairu (yellow card) 41'; Fairuz (yellow card) 10' (yellow-red card) 88'	Report	Syafiq (yellow card) 8'; Habib (yellow card) 23'; Irfan (yellow card) 45'; Hasbullah 74'; Fadzrul (yellow card) 90+5'	Stadium: City Stadium; Attendance: 6,102; Referee: Ahmad Zuhadi Dzulkifli

5 July 2024 Quarter-finals 2nd leg	Kedah	0–0 (1–0 agg.)	Penang	Alor Setar, Kedah
21:00 UTC+8	Sony (yellow card) 27'; Rizal (yellow card) 54'	Report	Syamer (yellow card) 53'; Namathevan (yellow card) 69'	Stadium: Darul Aman Stadium; Attendance: 16,700; Referee: Amirul Izwan Yaacob

=== Malaysia Cup ===
21 November 2024 Round of 16 1st leg	Penang	0–1	Kuching City	Georgetown, Penang
20:30 UTC+8	Richmond (yellow card) 67'	Report	Yuki (yellow card) 16'; Ramadhan 44'	Stadium: City Stadium; Attendance: 663; Referee: Suhaizi Shukri

30 November 2024 Round of 16 2nd leg	Kuching City	2–0 (3–0 agg.)	Penang	Kuching, Sarawak
19:30 UTC+8	Shamie (yellow card) 32'; James (yellow card) 35'; Tchétché 68'; Ramadhan 79'	Report	Adib (red card) 41'; Namathevan (yellow card) 77'; Richmond (yellow card) 84'	Stadium: Sarawak Stadium; Attendance: 1,549; Referee: Faizudin Ismail

=== MFL Challenge Cup ===
10 December 2024 Quarter-finals 1st leg	Penang	4–0	PT Athletic	Georgetown, Penang
20:30 UTC+8	Rodrigo 20'; Dylan 40'; Rafael 62'; Nabil 69'	Report	Yusri (yellow card) 61'	Stadium: City Stadium; Attendance: 513; Referee: Shamil Jaafar

23 December 2024 Quarter-finals 2nd leg	PT Athletic	0–2 (0–6 agg.)	Penang	Georgetown, Penang
20:15 UTC+8	Arif (yellow card) 44'; Syazwan (yellow card) 51'; Azarul (yellow card) 61'; Syakir (yellow card) 74'	Report	Khairu (yellow card) 9'; Namathevan (yellow card) 34'; Rafael 38', 45'; Adib (yellow card) 61'	Stadium: City Stadium; Attendance: 354; Referee: Fitri Maskon

19 January 2025 Semi-finals 1st leg	Penang	0–1	Selangor	Georgetown, Penang
20:30 UTC+8	Alif (yellow card) 75'	Report	Quentin (yellow card) 21'; Mukhairi (yellow card) 32'; Rafael 35' (o.g.); Ronnie (yellow card) 44'; Fazly (yellow card) 81'	Stadium: City Stadium; Attendance: 2,186; Referee: Nafeez Abd Wahab

2 February 2025 Semi-finals 2nd leg	Selangor	1–0 (2–0 agg.)	Penang	Petaling Jaya, Selangor
21:00 UTC+8	Safuwan (yellow card) 40+3'; Alex (yellow card) 49'; Alvin 66'; Kalamullah (yellow card) 89'	Report	Neto (yellow card) 26'; Amer (yellow card) 53'; Adib (yellow card) 63'; Khairul (yellow card) 68'; Rafael (yellow card) 82'	Stadium: Petaling Jaya Stadium; Attendance: 3,310; Referee: Tuan Mohd Yassin

== Statistics ==
=== Appearances and goals ===
No.	Pos.	Name	League		FA Cup		Malaysia Cup		Challenge Cup		Total		Discipline		
No.	Pos.	Name	Apps	Goals	Apps	Goals	Apps	Goals	Apps	Goals	Apps	Goals	Yellow card	(yellow card) (yellow-red card)	Red card
1	GK	(Malaysia) Haziq Mukriz	0	0	0	0	0	0	0	0	0	0	0	0	0
3	DF	(Malaysia) Aikmal Roslan	2(5)	0	0(2)	0	0	0	0	0	2(7)	0	0	0	0
4	DF	(Ghana) Richmond Ankrah	20	0	3	0	2	0	1	0	26	0	5	0	0
6	DF	(Malaysia) Khairul Akmal	7	0	0	0	0	0	3	0	10	0	5	0	0
7	FW	(Australia) Dylan Wenzel-Halls	16	5	0	0	2	0	4	1	22	6	2	0	0
8	MF	(Malaysia) Khairu Azrin	11(1)	0	2	0	0	0	2	0	15(1)	0	6	0	0
9	FW	(Brazil) Rodrigo Dias	21(1)	10	1	0	1(1)	0	4	1	27(2)	11	0	0	0
10	MF	(Brazil) Neto Olivera	17(5)	2	3	0	0	0	3(1)	0	23(6)	2	6	0	0
11	MF	(Malaysia) Amer Azahar	3(2)	0	2	0	1	0	2(1)	0	8(3)	0	1	0	0
12	MF	(Malaysia) Al-Hafiz Harun	6(7)	0	1(2)	0	1	0	1(1)	0	9(10)	0	1	0	0
14	MF	(Malaysia) Syamer Kutty Abba	21	0	3	0	2	0	3	0	29	0	6	0	0
15	DF	(Malaysia) Fairuz Zakaria	15(4)	0	2	0	0(1)	0	1	0	18(5)	0	3	1	0
17	DF	(Brazil) Rafael Vitor	20	4	3	0	2	0	4	3	28	7	6	0	0
20	MF	(Malaysia) Rahmat Makasuf	5(6)	1	0(1)	0	0(1)	0	0(1)	0	5(8)	1	3	0	0
21	MF	(Malaysia) Shafi Azswad	1	0	1	0	0	0	0	0	2	0	0	0	0
23	GK	(Malaysia) Sikh Izhan	22	0	3	0	2	0	3	0	30	0	2	0	0
25	GK	(Malaysia) Shafiq Afifi	1(2)	0	0	0	0	0	1	0	2(2)	0	0	0	0
26	DF	(Malaysia) Namathevan Arunasalam	9(3)	0	1(1)	0	2	0	3(1)	0	15(5)	0	5	0	0
28	MF	(Malaysia) Azrie Reza	0(4)	0	0	0	0(1)	0	0(2)	0	0(7)	0	0	0	0
30	FW	(Malaysia) Nabil Latpi	6(10)	0	3	1	1(1)	0	1(2)	1	12(12)	2	1	0	0
32	DF	(Malaysia) Aqil Irfanuddin	4(4)	0	(1)	0	0	0	0	0	4(5)	0	0	0	0
33	MF	(Malaysia) Nik Akif	16(4)	3	2(1)	0	2	0	2	0	22(5)	3	3	0	0
37	DF	(Malaysia) Azmeer Aris	2(2)	0	0	0	1(1)	0	1(2)	0	3(5)	0	1	0	0
46	DF	(Malaysia) Adib Raop	21(1)	1	3	0	2	0	4	0	29(1)	1	9	0	1
50	DF	(Malaysia) Zarif Syamil Zamani	0	0	0	0	0	0	0	0	0	0	0	0	0
55	FW	(Malaysia) Aidil Danial Izhar	0	0	0	0	0	0	0	0	0	0	0	0	0
71	MF	(Malaysia) Haziq Kutty Abba	2(2)	0	0	0	0	0	0	0	2(2)	0	1	1	0
72	DF	(Malaysia) Nabil Nizam	0	0	0	0	0	0	0	0	0	0	0	0	0
80	MF	(Malaysia) Izzat Zikri	10(11)	0	1(2)	0	0(2)	0	1(2)	0	12(17)	0	2	0	0
88	MF	(Malaysia) Daniel Irfan	0	0	0	0	0	0	0	0	0	0	0	0	0
94	GK	(Malaysia) Wahiey Amir	1	0	0	0	0	0	0	0	1	0	0	0	0
97	MF	(Malaysia) Idrzuwan Daud	1(1)	0	0	0	0	0	0(1)	0	1(2)	0	0	0	0
98	FW	(Malaysia) Akid Zamri	2(5)	0	0	0	0	0	0(1)	0	2(6)	0	1	0	0
99	FW	(Malaysia) Alif Ikmalrizal	2(16)	4	0(3)	0	1(1)	0	0(3)	0	3(23)	4	5	0	0
Player(s) who featured but departed the club on loan during the season:
18	DF	(Malaysia) Iman Rafaei	0	0	0	0	0	0	0	0	0	0	0	0	0
83	MF	(Malaysia) Khairil Anuar	0	0	0	0	0	0	0	0	0	0	0	0	0
Player(s) who featured but departed the club permanently during the season:
13	MF	(Malaysia) Muhaimin Izuddin	0(1)	0	0(1)	0	0	0	0	0	0(2)	0	0	0	0

Last updated: 21 April 2025.
Source: Soccerway

=== Top scorers ===
The list is sorted by shirt number when total goals are equal.

Rnk	Pos	No.	Player	League	FA Cup	Malaysia Cup	Challenge Cup	Total
1	FW	9	(Brazil) Rodrigo Dias	10	0	0	1	11
2	DF	17	(Brazil) Rafael Vitor	4	0	0	3	7
3	FW	7	(Australia) Dylan Wenzel-Halls	5	0	0	1	6
4	FW	99	(Malaysia) Alif Ikmalrizal	4	0	0	0	4
5	MF	33	(Malaysia) Nik Akif	3	0	0	0	3
6	MF	10	(Brazil) Neto Olivera	2	0	0	0	2
6	FW	30	(Malaysia) Nabil Latpi	0	1	0	1	2
7	MF	20	(Malaysia) Rahmat Makasuf	1	0	0	0	1
7	DF	46	(Malaysia) Adib Raop	1	0	0	0	1
Own goals				1	0	0	0	1
Totals				31	1	0	6	38

Last updated: 3 June 2025.
Source: Soccerway

=== Top assists ===
An assist is credited to a player for passing or crossing the ball to the scorer, a player whose shot rebounds (off a defender, goalkeeper or goalpost) to a teammate who scores, and a player who wins a penalty kick or a free kick for another player to convert.

The list is sorted by shirt number when total goals are equal.

Rnk	Pos	No.	Player	League	FA Cup	Malaysia Cup	Challenge Cup	Total
1	FW	7	(Australia) Dylan Wenzel-Halls	7	0	0	2	9
2	DF	46	(Malaysia) Adib Raop	5	0	0	0	5
3	FW	9	(Brazil) Rodrigo Dias	4	0	0	0	4
3	MF	33	(Malaysia) Nik Akif	2	0	0	2	4
4	DF	15	(Malaysia) Fairuz Zakaria	3	0	0	0	3
5	MF	10	(Brazil) Neto Olivera	2	0	0	0	2
5	MF	14	(Malaysia) Syamer Kutty Abba	2	0	0	0	2
6	MF	11	(Malaysia) Amer Azahar	0	1	0	0	1
6	MF	12	(Malaysia) Al-Hafiz Harun	1	0	0	0	1
6	DF	26	(Malaysia) Namathevan Arunasalam	1	0	0	0	1
6	MF	80	(Malaysia) Izzat Zikri	1	0	0	0	1
6	FW	99	(Malaysia) Alif Ikmalrizal	1	0	0	0	1
Totals				29	1	0	4	34

Last updated: 3 June 2025.
Source: Soccerway

=== Clean sheets ===
The list is sorted by shirt number when total clean sheets are equal.

Rnk	No.	Player	League	FA Cup	Malaysia Cup	MFL Challenge Cup	Total
1	23	(Malaysia) Sikh Izhan	7	1	0	1	9
2	25	(Malaysia) Shafiq Afifi	0	0	0	1	1
Totals			7	1	0	2	10

=== Summary ===
Games played	33 (24 Malaysia Super League), (3 Malaysia FA Cup), (2 Malaysia Cup), (4 MFL Challenge Cup)
Games won	9 (6 Malaysia Super League), (1 Malaysia FA Cup), (0 Malaysia Cup), (2 MFL Challenge Cup)
Games drawn	9 (8 Malaysia Super League), (1 Malaysia FA Cup), (0 Malaysia Cup), (0 MFL Challenge Cup)
Games lost	15 (10 Malaysia Super League), (1 Malaysia FA Cup), (2 Malaysia Cup), (2 MFL Challenge Cup)
Goals scored	38 (31 Malaysia Super League), (1 Malaysia FA Cup), (0 Malaysia Cup), (6 MFL Challenge Cup)
Goals conceded	45 (38 Malaysia Super League), (2 Malaysia FA Cup), (3 Malaysia Cup), (2 MFL Challenge Cup)
Goal difference	-7 (-7 Malaysia Super League), (-1 Malaysia FA Cup), (-3 Malaysia Cup), (+4 MFL Challenge Cup)
Clean sheets	10 (7 Malaysia Super League), (1 Malaysia FA Cup), (0 Malaysia Cup), (2 MFL Challenge Cup)
Yellow cards	74 (55 Malaysia Super League), (7 Malaysia FA Cup), (3 Malaysia Cup), (9 MFL Challenge Cup)
2nd Yellow	2 (1 Malaysia Super League), (1 Malaysia FA Cup), (0 Malaysia Cup), (0 MFL Challenge Cup)
Red cards	2 (1 Malaysia Super League), (0 Malaysia FA Cup), (1 Malaysia Cup), (0 MFL Challenge Cup)
Most appearances	Sikh Izhan, Adib Ra'op (30 appearances)
Top scorer	Rodrigo Dias (11 goals)
Winning Percentage	Overall: 9/33 (27.27%)

Last updated: 3 June 2025.
Source: Soccerway
