= 2025–26 Penang F.C. season =

Penang
2025–26 season
- Chairman: Daniel Gooi
- Head coach: Wan Rohaimi
- Stadium: City Stadium
- Malaysia Super League: 8th
- Malaysia FA Cup: Quarter-finals
- Malaysia Cup: Round of 16
- MFL Challenge Cup: Runner-Up
- Top goalscorer: League: Dylan Wenzel-Halls (10 goals); All: Dylan Wenzel-Halls (14 goals)
Home colours	Away colours

The 2025–26 season is Penang's 99th competitive season, 5th season in the first tier of Malaysian football since promoted in 2020, 103rd year in existence as a football club, and the 5th year since rebranded as Penang Football Club. The season covers the period from 10 May 2024 to 27 April 2025.

== Coaching staffs ==
Position	Name
Technical director	(Morocco) Merzagua Abderrazak
Head Coach	(Malaysia) Wan Rohaimi
Assistant Head Coach	(Malaysia) Mat Saiful Mohd
Assistant Coach	(Egypt) Ahmed M.Sayed
Goalkeeping Coach	(Malaysia) Mohd Hisham Jainudin
Fitness Coach	(Malaysia) Rozy Abdul Majid
Team Doctor	(Malaysia) Hardeep Singh Jaginder Singh (Malaysia) Parmjit Singh Kuldip Singh
Physiotherapist	(Malaysia) Ridhwan Noor Akmal
Team Analyst	(Malaysia) Anwar Azahari
Masseur	(Malaysia) Megat Loutifie
Kit Man	(Malaysia) Sufie Noorazizan
U-23 Team Manager	(Malaysia) Razif Radali
U-23 Head Coach	(Malaysia) Manzoor Azwira
U-23 Assistant Head Coach	(Malaysia) Farkhis Fisol
U-23 Goalkeeping Coach	(Malaysia) Azmirulkifli Haji Mohd Isa
U-23 Fitness Coach	(Malaysia) Rozy Abdul Majid
U-23 Team Doctor	(Malaysia) Azry Azmi
U-23 Physiotherapist	(Malaysia) Amirul Ehsan Mahrim
U-23 Security Officer	(Malaysia) Esa Alwi
U-23 Media Officer	(Malaysia) Zachki Suri
U-23 Kit Man	(Malaysia) Hafiz Ismail
U-21 Team Head Coach	(Malaysia) Rahim Hassan
U-19 Team Head Coach	(Malaysia) Zabidi Hassan

== Players ==
=== First-team squad ===
As of 12 February 2025

No.	Player	Nationality	Date of birth (age)	Signed from
Goalkeepers
1	Khairulazhan Khalid	(Malaysia)	7 November 1989 (age 36)	(Malaysia) Selangor
22	Ramadhan Hamid	(Malaysia)	16 February 1994 (age 32)	(Malaysia) Perak
36	Ashriq Izzat	(Malaysia)	24 March 2002 (age 24)	Youth Team
97	Khatul Anuar	(Malaysia)	2 April 1997 (age 29)	(Malaysia) Kelantan
Defenders
3	Akmal Zahir	(Malaysia)	16 February 1994 (age 32)	(Malaysia) Kedah Darul Aman
5	Limbikani Mzava	(Malawi)	12 November 1993 (age 32)	(South Africa) AmaZulu
6	Khairul Akmal	(Malaysia)	28 May 1998 (age 28)	Academy
15	Stefano Brundo	(Argentina)	19 May 1993 (age 33)	(Malaysia) Pahang
27	Ariff Farhan Isa	(Malaysia)	14 July 1996 (age 30)	(Malaysia) Kedah Darul Aman
46	Adib Raop	(Malaysia)	25 October 1999 (age 27)	(Malaysia) Perak
55	Faith Friday Obilor	(Nigeria)	5 March 1991 (age 35)	(Malaysia) PDRM
Midfielders
8	OJ Porteria	(Philippines) (United States)	9 May 1994 (age 32)	(Philippines) Stallion Laguna
9	Lim In-kyu	(South Korea)	15 August 2002 (age 24)	(South Korea) Yangpyeong FC
16	Ahmad Irfan	(Malaysia)	25 June 2001 (age 25)	(Malaysia) Johor Darul Ta'zim II
19	Chia Ruo Han	(Malaysia)	1 September 2001 (age 25)	(Malaysia) Johor Darul Ta'zim II
35	Hasbullah Abu Bakar	(Malaysia)	26 October 1994 (age 32)	(Malaysia) Kedah Darul Aman
71	Haziq Kutty Abba	(Malaysia)	28 September 2004 (age 22)	Academy (Note: Promoted from U23)
77	Amirul Hisyam Kechik	(Malaysia)	5 May 1995 (age 31)	(Malaysia) Kedah Darul Aman
80	Izzat Zikri	(Malaysia)	17 January 2001 (age 25)	Academy
92	Thiago Fernandes	(Timor-Leste) (Brazil)	9 June 1992 (age 34)	(Indonesia) Persikas Subang
Forwards
7	Dylan Wenzel-Halls	(Australia)	15 December 1997 (age 28)	(Australia) Central Coast Mariners
10	Bruno Suzuki	(Japan) (Brazil)	20 May 1990 (age 36)	(Malaysia) PDRM
11	Wan Zack Haikal	(Malaysia)	28 January 1991 (age 35)	(Malaysia) Perak
14	Firdaus Saiyadi	(Malaysia)	22 October 1996 (age 30)	(Malaysia) Perak
20	Danilo Šipovac	(Bosnia and Herzegovina)	17 April 2000 (age 26)	(Bosnia and Herzegovina) FK BSK
23	Kipré Tchétché	(Ivory Coast)	16 December 1987 (age 38)	(Malaysia) Kuching
28	Akid Zamri	(Malaysia)	13 February 2005 (age 21)	Selangor FC 2
99	Aliff Ikmalrizal	(Malaysia)	9 December 2002 (age 23)	Academy
Out on loan
Status Unknown
50	Zarif Syamil Zamani (D)	(Malaysia)	11 December 2002 (age 23)	Academy
72	Nabil Nizam (D)	(Malaysia)	26 February 2001 (age 25)	Academy
55	Aidil Danial Izhar (F)	(Malaysia)	23 September 2001 (age 25)	Academy
83	Khairil Anuar (M)	(Malaysia)	8 March 1995 (age 31)	(Malaysia) Kelantan
97	Idrzuwan Daud (F)	(Malaysia)	15 April 2001 (age 25)	Academy

== Transfers and contracts ==
=== In ===
Preseason

Position	Player	Transferred from	Ref
GK	(Malaysia) Khairulazhan Khalid	(Malaysia) Selangor	Free
GK	(Malaysia) Ramadhan Hamid	(Malaysia) Perak	Free
GK	(Malaysia) Khatul Anuar	(Malaysia) Kelantan Darul Naim	Free
DF	(Malawi) Limbikani Mzava	(South Africa) AmaZulu	Free
DF	(Nigeria) Faith Friday Obilor	(Malaysia) PDRM	Free
DF	(Argentina) Stefano Brundo	(Malaysia) Pahang	Free
DF	(Malaysia) Akmal Zahir	(Malaysia) Kedah Darul Aman	Free
DF	(Malaysia) Ariff Farhan Isa	(Malaysia) Kedah Darul Aman	Free
MF	(Malaysia) Hasbullah Abu Bakar	(Malaysia) Kedah Darul Aman	Free
MF	(Malaysia) Amirul Hisyam Kechik	(Malaysia) Kedah Darul Aman	Free
MF	(Malaysia) Chia Ruo Han	(Malaysia) Johor Darul Ta'zim II	Free
MF	(Malaysia) Ahmad Irfan	(Malaysia) Johor Darul Ta'zim II	Free
MF	(Timor-Leste) (Brazil) Thiago Fernandes	(Indonesia) Persikas Subang	Free
MF	(Philippines) (United States) OJ Porteria	(Philippines) Stallion Laguna	Free
MF	(Malaysia) Wan Zack Haikal	(Malaysia) Perak	Free
MF	(South Korea) Lim In-kyu	(South Korea) Yangpyeong FC	Free
FW	(Malaysia) Firdaus Saiyadi	(Malaysia) Perak	Free
FW	(Ivory Coast) Kipré Tchétché	(Malaysia) Kuching City	Free
FW	(Japan) (Brazil) Bruno Suzuki	(Malaysia) PDRM	Free
FW	(Bosnia and Herzegovina) Danilo Šipovac	(Bosnia and Herzegovina) FK BSK	Free

=== Loan Return (In) ===
Preseason

Position	Player	Transferred from	Ref
DF	(Malaysia) Iman Rafaei	(Malaysia) Bukit Tambun	Loan Return
MF	(Malaysia) Khairil Anuar	(Malaysia) Gombak	Loan Return

=== Out ===
Preseason

Position	Player	Transferred To	Ref
GK	(Malaysia) Haziq Mukriz	(Malaysia) UM-Damansara United	Free
GK	(Malaysia) Shafiq Afifi	(Malaysia) Kelantan Red Warrior	Free
DF	(Malaysia) Fairuz Zakaria	(Brunei) DPMM FC	Free
DF	(Malaysia) Aikmal Roslan	(Malaysia) AAK	Free
DF	(Malaysia) Iman Rafaei	(Malaysia)	Free
DF	(Malaysia) Azmeer Aris	(Malaysia) Immigration	Free
DF	(Malaysia) Namathevan Arunasalam	(Malaysia) Kedah FA	Free
DF	(Brazil) Rafael Vitor	(Brazil) Amazonas FC (B2)	Free
MF	(Malaysia) Khairu Azrin	(Malaysia)	Free
MF	(Malaysia) Amer Azahar	(Malaysia)	Free
MF	(Malaysia) Al-Hafiz Harun	(Malaysia) Immigration	Free
MF	(Malaysia) Nik Akif	(Malaysia) Immigration	Free
MF	(Malaysia) Rahmat Makasuf	(Malaysia) Kedah FA	Free
MF	(Malaysia) Shafi Azswad	(Malaysia) Immigration II	Free
MF	(Malaysia) Azrie Reza	(Malaysia)	Free
MF	(Brazil) Neto Olivera	(Brazil) Trem (B4)	Free
FW	(Brazil) Rodrigo Dias	(Thailand) PT Prachuap	Free
FW	(Malaysia) Nabil Latpi	(Malaysia) Kedah FA	Free

=== Loan Return (Out) ===
Preseason

Position	Player	Transferred To	Ref
GK	(Malaysia) Sikh Izhan	(Malaysia) Selangor	Loan Return
DF	(Ghana) Richmond Ankrah	(Malaysia) Selangor	Loan Return
MF	(Malaysia) Aqil Irfanuddin	(Malaysia) Terengganu II	Loan Return
MF	(Malaysia) Syamer Kutty Abba	(Malaysia) Johor Darul Ta'zim	Loan Return

== Friendly matches ==
Win Draw Loss

21 June 2025 1	Penang FC (Malaysia)	4–0	(Malaysia) Bintong FC	Penang
				Stadium: City Stadium Penang; Attendance: 0 (Behind-closed-doors)

4 July 2025 2	Johor Darul Ta'zim II (Malaysia)	0–4	(Malaysia) Penang FC	Johor
				Stadium: Pasir Gudang Corporation Stadium

5 July 2025 3	Immigration FC II (Malaysia)	1–0	(Malaysia) Penang FC	Selangor
				Stadium: Stadium UPM Mini

8 July 2025 4	Terengganu FC (Malaysia)	3–1	(Malaysia) Penang FC	Terengganu
	Safwan Mazlan 43'; Careca 78'; Yan Manbella 82'		Kipré Tchétché 29'	Stadium: Sultan Ismail Nasiruddin Shah Stadium

15 July 2025 5	Penang FC (Malaysia)	2–0	(Malaysia) Kedah FA	Penang
				Stadium: City Stadium Penang; Attendance: 0 (Behind-closed-doors)

20 July 2025 6	Penang FC (Malaysia)	1–1	(Cambodia) Phnom Penh Crown	Penang
				Stadium: City Stadium Penang

24 July 2025 7	Penang FC (Malaysia)	1–0	(Malaysia) PDRM FC	Penang
				Stadium: City Stadium Penang

30 July 2025 8	Immigration FC (Malaysia)	0–1	(Malaysia) Penang FC	Penang
				Stadium: City Stadium Penang

== Competitions ==
=== Overview ===
Competition	First match	Last match	Starting round	Final position	Record							
Competition	First match	Last match	Starting round	Final position	Pld	W	D	L	GF	GA	GD	Win %
Malaysia Super League	10 August 2025	15 May 2026	Matchday 1	8th	24	6	7	11	26	41	−15	25.00
Malaysia FA Cup	17 August 2025	28 October 2025	Round of 16	Quarter-finals	4	2	0	2	6	5	+1	50.00
Malaysia Cup	18 January 2026	24 January 2026	Round of 16	Round of 16	2	1	0	1	1	2	−1	50.00
MFL Challenge Cup	7 February 2026	19 April 2026	Quarter-finals	Runners-up	6	3	3	0	8	3	+5	50.00
Total					36	12	10	14	41	51	−10	33.33

Source: Competitions

=== Malaysia Super League ===
10 August 2025 1	Penang	0–3	Terengganu	Georgetown
			Azam Azmi 50'; Gabriel Silva 55'; Khalaif Naskam 89'; Safwan Mazlan (yellow card) 53'	Stadium: City Stadium Penang

13 August 2025 2	Melaka (Malacca)	1–1	Penang	Melaka
	Juan Teles 69'		Dylan Wenzel-Halls 29'; Akmal Zahir (yellow card) 26'; Thiago Fernandes (yellow card) 48'	Stadium: Hang Jebat Stadium; Referee: Fusser Sallih

24 August 2025 3	Penang	1–2	Kuala Lumpur	Georgetown
	Stefano Brundo 49'; Hasbullah Abu Bakar (yellow card) 22'; Adib Ra'op (yellow card) 38'; Dylan Wenzel-Halls (yellow card) 60'		Safawi Rasid 34'; Kamal Azizi 77'; Gorka Larrucea Arrien (yellow card) 84'	Stadium: City Stadium Penang; Referee: Hasrol Amir

31 January 2026 4 (Rescheduled)	Kelantan	–	Penang	Kota Bahru
				Stadium: Sultan Muhammad IV Stadium

11 September 2025 5 (Rescheduled)	Johor Darul Ta'zim	6–0	Penang	Johor
	Jairo 9'; Arif Aiman 18', 31'; João Figueiredo 33'; Jon Irazabal 45+3'; Antonio Glauder 53'; Hector Hevel (yellow card) 82'		Firdaus Saiyadi (yellow card) 90+6'	Stadium: Sultan Ibrahim Stadium

4 October 2025 6	Penang	2–1	Negeri Sembilan	Georgetown
	Kipré Tchétché 13', 49'; Ahmad Irfan (yellow card) 63'; Stefano Brundo (yellow card) 64'		Faith Friday Obilor 90+9'; Zahril Azri (yellow card) 51'; Jovan Motika (yellow card) 64'; Luis Enrique (yellow card) 90+4'	Stadium: City Stadium Penang

25 October 2025 7	Kuching (Sarawak)	1–1	Penang	Kuching
	Ronald Ngah 45+7' (pen.); Arif Fadzilah (yellow card) 31'		Kipré Tchétché 13'; Adib Ra'op (yellow card) 50'; Haziq Kutty (yellow card) 75'	Stadium: Sarawak State Stadium

2 November 2025 8	Penang	0–1	(Penang) Immigration	Georgetown
			Wilmar Jordan 59'; Loqman Hakim (yellow card) 29'; Fadzrul Danel (yellow card) 72'; Eduardo Sosa (yellow card) 75'; Zarif Irfan (yellow card) 90+5'	Stadium: City Stadium Penang

23 November 2025 9	Sabah	3–2	Penang	Kota Kinabalu
	Ajdin Mujagić 22'; Jafri Firdaus Chew 56'; Daniel Ting 70' (yellow card) 52'; Danny Ingham (yellow card) 38'; Dean Pelekanos (yellow card) 43'		Dylan Wenzel-Halls 17', 39'; Adib Abdul Ra'op (yellow card) 67'	Stadium: Likas Stadium

7 December 2025 10 (Rescheduled)	Penang	1–5	Selangor	Georgetown
	Kipré Tchétché 45+19' (yellow card) 90+2'		Faisal Halim 26'; Picha Autra 45+5'; Quentin Cheng (yellow card) 45+10'; Chrigor 45+12', 59', 75'	Stadium: City Stadium Penang; Referee: Khairulsyahmi Ahmad Khalidi

19 December 2025 11	Penang	3–0	(Selangor) PDRM	Georgetown
	Dylan Wenzel-Halls 23', 74' (pen.); Firdaus Saiyadi 53'		Fadi Awad (red card) 31'; Dick Cheny Waili (yellow card) 90+3'	Stadium: City Stadium Penang

23 December 2025 12	DPMM (Brunei)	2–0	Penang	Bandar Seri Begawan
	Jordan Murray 18'; Azwan Ali Rahman 23'; Prosper Boakye Owusu (yellow card) 55'; Abdul Hariz Herman (yellow card) 90+1'		OJ Porteria (yellow card) 21'; Amirul Hisyam (yellow card) 57'; Khairul Akmal (yellow card) 90+5'	Stadium: Hassanal Bolkiah National Stadium

3 January 2026 13	Terengganu	–	Penang	Terengganu
				Stadium: Sultan Mizan Zainal Abidin Stadium

11 January 2026 14	Penang	–	(Malacca) Melaka	Georgetown
				Stadium: City Stadium Penang

14 January 2026 15	Kuala Lumpur	–	Penang	Kuala Lumpur
				Stadium: Kuala Lumpur Football Stadium

30 August 2025 16 (Rescheduled)	Penang	0–1	Kelantan	Georgetown
	Dylan Wenzel-Halls (yellow card) 20'; Khairul Akmal (red card) 26'		Ifedayo Olusegun 28'; Sean Selvaraj (yellow card) 5'	Stadium: City Stadium Penang

28 February 2026 17	Penang	–	Johor Darul Ta'zim	Georgetown
				Stadium: City Stadium Penang

7 March 2026 18	Negeri Sembilan	–	Penang	Paroi
				Stadium: Tuanku Abdul Rahman Stadium

14 March 2026 19	Penang	–	(Sarawak) Kuching	Georgetown
				Stadium: City Stadium Penang

11 April 2026 20	Immigration (Penang)	–	Penang	Georgetown
				Stadium: Penang State Stadium

26 April 2026 21	Penang	–	Sabah	Georgetown
				Stadium: City Stadium Penang

2 May 2026 22	Selangor	–	Penang	Petaling Jaya
				Stadium: MBPJ Stadium

8 May 2026 23	PDRM (Selangor)	–	Penang	Selayang
				Stadium: Selayang Stadium

15 May 2026 24	Penang	–	(Brunei) DPMM	Georgetown
				Stadium: City Stadium Penang

==== League table ====
Pos	Team	Pld	W	D	L	GF	GA	GD	Pts	Qualification or relegation
6	Immigration	24	9	5	10	38	43	−5	32	
7	Negeri Sembilan	24	6	11	7	39	35	+4	29	
8	Penang	24	6	7	11	26	41	−15	25	
9	Sabah	24	5	8	11	29	44	−15	23	
10	DPMM	24	6	5	13	30	57	−27	23	Ineligible for AFC competition spots

Updated to match(es) played on 17 May 2026. Source: Malaysian Football League
Rules for classification: 1) Points; 2) Goal difference; 3) Number of goals scored.

=== Malaysia FA Cup ===
16 August 2025 Round 1 Leg 1	Melaka	0–2	Penang	Melaka
	Patrick Gama Thomaz (yellow card) 54'	Report	Dylan Wenzel-Halls 48', 81'; Danilo Šipovac (yellow card) 44'; Akmal Zahir (yellow card) 48'; Hasbullah Abu Bakar (yellow card) 55'	Stadium: Hang Jebat Stadium

15 September 2025 Round 1 Leg 2 (Rescheduled)	Penang	3–0 (5–0 agg.)	Melaka	Georgetown
	Stefano Brundo 11'; Haziq Kutty Abba 39'; Kipré Tchétché 80'; Ariff Farhan Isa (yellow card) 49'; Stefano Brundo (yellow card) 55'; Khairu Azrin (red card) 74'	Report	Irfan Zakaria (yellow card) 14'; Che Rasid (yellow card) 54'	Stadium: City Stadium Penang; Attendance: 885; Referee: S. Logeswaran

Penang won 5–0 on aggregate.

17 October 2025 QF Leg 1	Penang	1–2	Johor Darul Ta'zim	Georgetown
	Adib Abdul Ra'op 36'; Haziq Kutty Abba (yellow card) 27'; Ahmad Irfan (red card) 45'		Óscar Arribas 6' (yellow card) 73'; Ager Aketxe 56'; Park Jun-Heong (yellow card) 60'	Stadium: City Stadium Penang; Referee: Faizudin Ismail

28 October 2025 QF Leg 2	Johor Darul Ta'zim	3–0 (5–1 agg.)	Penang	Johor
	Bérgson 38'; J. Silva 42'; Israfilov 45+2'	Report		Stadium: Sultan Ibrahim Stadium; Referee: Izzul Fikri

JDT won 5–1 on aggregate.

=== Malaysia Cup ===
17 January 2026 Rd of 16 Leg 1	Kuching	–	Penang	Kuching
				Stadium: Sarawak State Stadium

23 January 2026 Rd of 16 Leg 2	Penang	–	Kuching	Georgetown
				Stadium: City Stadium Penang

== Team statistics ==
=== Appearances and goals ===
As of 23 Dec 2025

No.	Pos.	Player	Malaysia Super League		FA Cup		Malaysia Cup		Total	
No.	Pos.	Player	Apps.	Goals	Apps.	Goals	Apps.	Goals	Apps.	Goals
1	GK	(Malaysia) Khairulazhan Khalid	8	0	3	0	0	0	11	0
3	DF	(Malaysia) Akmal Zahir	3	0	1	0	0	0	4	0
5	DF	(Malawi) Limbikani Mzava	0	0	0	0	0	0	0	0
6	DF	(Malaysia) Khairul Akmal	2+4	0	0	0	0	0	6	0
7	FW	(Australia) Dylan Wenzel-Halls	12	5	4	2	0	0	16	7
8	MF	(Philippines) (United States) OJ Porteria	9	0	2	0	0	0	11	0
9	FW	(South Korea) Lim In-kyu	0+1	0	0	0	0	0	1	0
10	FW	(Japan) (Brazil) Bruno Suzuki	3+6	0	1+3	0	0	0	13	0
11	FW	(Malaysia) Wan Zack Haikal	5+3	0	2+1	0	0	0	11	0
14	FW	(Malaysia) Firdaus Saiyadi	1+5	1	1+2	0	0	0	9	1
15	MF	(Argentina) Stefano Brundo	12	1	4	1	0	0	16	2
16	MF	(Malaysia) Ahmad Irfan	8+2	0	2+1	0	0	0	13	0
19	MF	(Malaysia) Chia Ruo Han	1+5	0	0	0	0	0	6	0
20	FW	(Bosnia and Herzegovina) Danilo Šipovac	10+2	0	4	0	0	0	16	0
22	GK	(Malaysia) Ramadhan Hamid	4	0	1	0	0	0	5	0
23	FW	(Ivory Coast) Kipré Tchétché	9+1	4	3+1	1	0	0	14	5
27	DF	(Malaysia) Ariff Farhan Isa	3+3	0	2+1	0	0	0	9	0
28	FW	(Malaysia) Akid Zamri	1+3	0	0	0	0	0	4	0
35	MF	(Malaysia) Hasbullah Abu Bakar	4+5	0	0+3	0	0	0	12	0
36	GK	(Malaysia) Ashriq Izzat	0	0	0	0	0	0	0	0
46	DF	(Malaysia) Adib Raop	10	0	3+1	1	0	0	14	1
55	DF	(Nigeria) Faith Friday Obilor	9	0	3	0	0	0	12	0
71	MF	(Malaysia) Haziq Kutty Abba	3+2	0	3+1	0	0	0	9	0
77	MF	(Malaysia) Amirul Hisyam Kechik	10	0	4	1	0	0	14	1
80	MF	(Malaysia) Izzat Zikri	4+2	0	0+2	0	0	0	8	0
92	MF	(Timor-Leste) (Brazil) Thiago Fernandes	1+1	0	1	0	0	0	3	0
97	GK	(Malaysia) Khatul Anuar	0	0	0	0	0	0	0	0
99	FW	(Malaysia) Alif Ikmalrizal	0+2	0	0+1	0	0	0	3	0
