= 2024–25 Malaysia Cup knockout stage =

The 2024–25 Malaysia Cup knockout stage began on 20 November 2024 and concluded on 26 April 2025 with the final at Bukit Jalil National Stadium in Kuala Lumpur, to decide the champions of the 2024–25 Malaysia Cup. A total of 16 teams competed in the knockout phase.

== Qualified teams ==
The seeded teams were drawn against the unseeded teams, with the seeded teams become hosting for the second leg of round of 16.

For the draw, the teams were seeded and unseeded into two pots based on the following principles (introduced starting this season). The results seeding will be determined after week 13 of Super League and after week 14 of A1 Semi-Pro League:

- Pot A contained the top 8 teams from 2024–25 Super League.
- Pot B contained the 9th until 13th placed teams from 2024–25 Super League, and the 3 teams selected from 2024–25 A1 Semi-Pro League, based on subject approval from the MFL Board of Directors.

Key to colours
Teams from 2024–25 Malaysia Super League
Teams from 2024–25 Malaysia A1 Semi-Pro League

Pot A (seeded)
Rank	Team
1	Johor Darul Ta'zim
2	Selangor
3	Sabah
4	Terengganu
5	PDRM
6	Kuching City
7	Perak
8	Kuala Lumpur City

Pot B (unseeded)
Rank	Team
9	Sri Pahang
10	Kedah Darul Aman
11	Penang
12	Negeri Sembilan
13	Kelantan Darul Naim
14	Melaka
15	PT Athletic
16	Kuala Lumpur Rovers

== Format ==
Each tie in the knockout phase, apart from the final, was played over two legs, with each team playing one leg at home. The team that scored more goals on aggregate over the two legs advanced to the next round. If the aggregate score was level, then 30 minutes of extra time was played (the away goals rule was not applied). If the score was still level at the end of extra time, the winners were decided by a penalty shoot-out. In the final, which was played as a single match, if the score was level at the end of normal time, extra time was played, followed by a penalty shoot-out if the score was still level.

The mechanism of the draws for each round was as follows:

- The seeded teams were drawn against the unseeded teams, with the seeded teams hosting the second leg.
- In the draws for the quarter-finals onwards, there were no seedings.

== Schedule ==
The draw for the 2024–25 Malaysia Cup was held on 11 November 2024.

Phase	Round	First leg	Second leg
Knockout phase	Round of 16	20–24 November 2024	27 & 29–30 November & 1 December 2024
Knockout phase	Quarter-finals	13–15 December 2024	21–23 December 2024
Knockout phase	Semi-finals	17–18 January 2025	1–2 February 2025
Knockout phase	Final	26 April 2025 at Bukit Jalil National Stadium, Kuala Lumpur	

== Bracket ==
The bracket was decided after the draw.

Round of 16
Negeri Sembilan	1	3	4
PDRM	2	0	2
Melaka	1	0	1
Terengganu	4	0	4
Kedah Darul Aman	3	1	4
Kuala Lumpur City	2	4	6
Kuala Lumpur Rovers	0	0	0
Johor Darul Ta'zim	3	6	9
Penang	0	0	0
Kuching City	1	2	3
PT Athletic	0	0	0
Sabah	4	3	7
Kelantan Darul Naim	0	1	1
Perak	3	3	6
Sri Pahang	1	2	3
Selangor	1	1	2

Quarter-finals
Negeri Sembilan	0	2	2
Terengganu	2	4	6
Kuala Lumpur City	1	0	1
Johor Darul Ta'zim	2	4	6
Kuching City	0	0	0
Sabah	1	0	1
Perak	0	3	3
Sri Pahang	1	3	4

Semi-finals
Terengganu	0	1	1
Johor Darul Ta'zim	4	2	6
Sabah	1	1	2
Sri Pahang (a.e.t.)	1	2	3

Final
Johor Darul Ta'zim	2
Sri Pahang	1

== Round of 16 ==
The first legs were played on 20 until 24 November, and the second legs were played on 27, 29, 30 November and 1 December 2024. The losers were transferred to the MFL Challenge Cup.

Team 1	Agg.	Team 2	1st leg	2nd leg
Kuala Lumpur Rovers	0–9	Johor Darul Ta'zim	0–3	0–6
Penang	0–3	Kuching City	0–1	0–2
Kedah Darul Aman	4–6	Kuala Lumpur City	3–2	1–4
Kelantan Darul Naim	1–6	Perak	0–3	1–3
PT Athletic	0–7	Sabah	0–4	0–3
Sri Pahang	3–2	Selangor	1–1	2–1
Melaka	1–4	Terengganu	1–4	0–0
Negeri Sembilan	4–2	PDRM	1–2	3–0

=== Matches ===
First leg

20 November 2024
18:00 UTC+8

Kuala Lumpur Rovers	0–3	Johor Darul Ta'zim
	Report	Heberty 26', 30', 71'

Sultan Ibrahim Stadium, Iskandar Puteri (Note: Kuala Lumpur Rovers played their home matches at Sultan Ibrahim Stadium, Iskandar Puteri, instead of their regular home stadium Kuala Lumpur Stadium, Cheras respectively, due to financial factors being a constraint to handle the first match at their own stadium.)
Attendance: 2,005
Referee: Fusser Mad Sallih

Second leg

30 November 2024
17:30 UTC+8

Johor Darul Ta'zim	6–0	Kuala Lumpur Rovers
Raffi 13' (o.g.); Corbin-Ong 33'; Jesé 45+3'; Bérgson 75', 82'; Sumareh 88'	Report

Sultan Ibrahim Stadium, Iskandar Puteri
Attendance: 7,127
Referee: Firdaus Dahlan

Johor Darul Ta'zim won 9–0 on aggregate.

First leg

21 November 2024
20:30 UTC+8

Penang	0–1	Kuching City
	Report	Ramadhan 44'

City Stadium, George Town
Attendance: 663
Referee: Suhaizi Shukri

Second leg

30 November 2024
19:30 UTC+8

Kuching City	2–0	Penang
Tchétché 68'; Ramadhan 79'	Report

Sarawak State Stadium, Kuching
Attendance: 1,549
Referee: Faizudin Ismail

Kuching City won 3–0 on aggregate.

First leg

22 November 2024
21:00 UTC+8

Kedah Darul Aman	3–2	Kuala Lumpur City
Nordé 27', 30'; Nurullaev 68'	Report	R. Lambert 13'; Motika 72'

Darulaman Stadium, Alor Setar
Attendance: 3,386
Referee: Faizudin Ismail

Second leg

1 December 2024
21:00 UTC+8

Kuala Lumpur City	4–1	Kedah Darul Aman
Josué 14'; Motika 19'; R. Lambert 41'; Zhafri 90+2'	Report	Gordić 74'

Kuala Lumpur Stadium, Cheras
Attendance: 1,778
Referee: Fitri Maskon

Kuala Lumpur City won 6–4 on aggregate.

First leg

22 November 2024
21:00 UTC+8

Kelantan Darul Naim	0–3	Perak
	Report	Clayton 22'; Azfar 80'; Daniel 90+1' (pen.)

MBPJ Stadium, Petaling Jaya (Note: Kelantan Darul Naim will play their home matches at MBPJ Stadium, Petaling Jaya, instead of their regular stadium, Sultan Muhammad IV Stadium, Kota Bharu, which is being renovated.)
Attendance: 714
Referee: S. Logeswaran

Second leg

30 November 2024
20:30 UTC+8

Perak	3–1	Kelantan Darul Naim
Clayton 9'; Zack 36'; Ariff 60'	Report	Adam 84'

Manjung Municipal Council Stadium, Seri Manjung
Attendance: 1,871
Referee: Zamzaidi Katimin

Perak won 6–1 on aggregate.

First leg

23 November 2024
17:00 UTC+8

PT Athletic	0–4	Sabah
	Report	Saddil 13'; Haqim 19'; Ting 76'; Yusri 90+7' (o.g.)

Kuala Lumpur Stadium, Cheras (Note: PT Athletic played their home matches at Kuala Lumpur Stadium, Cheras, instead of their regular home stadium MMU Stadium, Cyberjaya respectively, which did not meet MFL requirements.)
Attendance: 512
Referee: Abang Azharudin Abdullah

Second leg

27 November 2024
20:30 UTC+8

Sabah	3–0	PT Athletic
Lok 67' (pen.); Wilkin 73'; Pedro 81'	Report

Kuala Lumpur Stadium, Cheras (Note: Sabah played their home matches at Kuala Lumpur Stadium, Cheras, instead of their regular home stadium Likas Stadium, Kota Kinabalu.)
Attendance: 448
Referee: Ahmad Zuhadi Dzulkifli

Sabah won 7–0 on aggregate.

First leg

23 November 2024
20:30 UTC+8

Sri Pahang	1–1	Selangor
Selvaraj 27'	Report	Jambor 83'

Temerloh Mini Stadium, Temerloh
Attendance: 2,627
Referee: Hasrol Amir

Second leg

1 December 2024
20:30 UTC+8

Selangor	1–2	Sri Pahang
Safuwan 77'	Report	Hidalgo 25' (pen.); Agüero 84' (pen.)

MBPJ Stadium, Petaling Jaya
Attendance: 7,065
Referee: Kamil Zakaria

Sri Pahang won 3–2 on aggregate.

First leg

23 November 2024
21:00 UTC+8

Melaka	1–4	Terengganu
Issah 56'	Report	Safawi 8'; Akhyar 15' (pen.), 54'; Alif 90+1'

Hang Jebat Stadium, Krubong
Attendance: 2,880
Referee: Tuan Mohd Yaasin

Second leg

29 November 2024
21:00 UTC+8

Terengganu	0–0	Melaka
	Report

Sultan Mizan Zainal Abidin Stadium, Kuala Nerus
Attendance: 898
Referee: Amirul Izwan Yaacob

Terengganu won 4–1 on aggregate.

First leg

24 November 2024
21:00 UTC+8

Negeri Sembilan	1–2	PDRM
Selvan 69'	Report	Hadi 90+6'; Ifedayo 90+8'

Tuanku Abdul Rahman Stadium, Paroi
Attendance: 248
Referee: Fitri Maskon

Second leg

29 November 2024
20:30 UTC+8

PDRM	0–3	Negeri Sembilan
	Report	Eizrul 8' (o.g.); Hadin 53'; Selvan 80'

Selayang Stadium, Selayang
Attendance: 167
Referee: Tuan Mohd Yaasin

Negeri Sembilan won 4–2 on aggregate.

== Quarter-finals ==
The first legs were played on 13, 14 and 15 December, and the second legs were played on 21, 22 and 23 December 2024.

Team 1	Agg.	Team 2	1st leg	2nd leg
Perak	3–4	Sri Pahang	0–1	3–3
Kuala Lumpur City	1–6	Johor Darul Ta'zim	1–2	0–4
Negeri Sembilan	2–6	Terengganu	0–2	2–4
Kuching City	0–1	Sabah	0–1	0–0

=== Matches ===
First leg

13 December 2024
20:30 UTC+8

Perak	0–1	Sri Pahang
	Report	Sherman 23'

Manjung Municipal Council Stadium, Seri Manjung
Attendance: 2,299
Referee: S. Logeswaran

Second leg

22 December 2024
20:30 UTC+8

Sri Pahang	3–3	Perak
Hidalgo 5', 30' (pen.), 45+3' (pen.)	Report	Zack 9'; Nyholm 42'; Daniel 54'

Temerloh Mini Stadium, Temerloh
Attendance: 4,678
Referee: Izzul Fikri

Sri Pahang won 4–3 on aggregate.

First leg

13 December 2024
21:00 UTC+8

Kuala Lumpur City	1–2	Johor Darul Ta'zim
Brendan 89'	Report	Bérgson 33'; Heberty 79'

Kuala Lumpur Stadium, Cheras
Attendance: 3,204
Referee: Suhaizi Shukri

Second leg

21 December 2024
17:30 UTC+8

Johor Darul Ta'zim	4–0	Kuala Lumpur City
Arif Aiman 36' (pen.); Bérgson 45+2', 56' (pen.); Muñiz 62'	Report

Sultan Ibrahim Stadium, Iskandar Puteri
Attendance: 14,894
Referee: S. Logeswaran

Johor Darul Ta'zim won 6–1 on aggregate.

First leg

14 December 2024
17:00 UTC+8

Negeri Sembilan	0–2	Terengganu
	Report	Safawi 20'; Bonilla 86' (pen.)

Tuanku Abdul Rahman Stadium, Paroi
Attendance: 1,040
Referee: Usaid Jamal

Second leg

21 December 2024
21:00 UTC+8

Terengganu	4–2	Negeri Sembilan
Akhyar 41'; Safawi 45+5'; Azam 82'; Shahrul 90+4' (pen.)	Report	Hadin 25' (pen.); Selvan 34'

Sultan Mizan Zainal Abidin Stadium, Kuala Nerus
Attendance: 6,225
Referee: Hasrol Amir

Terengganu won 6–2 on aggregate.

First leg

15 December 2024
20:15 UTC+8

Kuching City	0–1	Sabah
	Report	Farhan 32'

Sarawak State Stadium, Kuching
Attendance: 2,430
Referee: Zamzaidi Katimin

Second leg

23 December 2024
20:15 UTC+8

Sabah	0–0	Kuching City
	Report

Likas Stadium, Kota Kinabalu
Attendance: 7,125
Referee: Suhaizi Shukri

Sabah won 1–0 on aggregate.

== Semi-finals ==
The first legs were played on 17 and 18 January, and the second legs were played on 1 and 2 February 2025.

Team 1	Agg.	Team 2	1st leg	2nd leg
Terengganu	1–6	Johor Darul Ta'zim	0–4	1–2
Sabah	2–3	Sri Pahang	1–1	1–2 (a.e.t.)

=== Matches ===
First leg

17 January 2025
21:00 UTC+8

Terengganu	0–4	Johor Darul Ta'zim
	Report	Morales 17'; Arif Aiman 79', 85'; Bérgson 90+3'

Sultan Mizan Zainal Abidin Stadium, Kuala Nerus
Attendance: 11,250
Referee: Fitri Maskon

Second leg

1 February 2025
17:30 UTC+8

Johor Darul Ta'zim	2–1	Terengganu
Heberty 32', 90+1'	Report	Akinade 59'

Sultan Ibrahim Stadium, Iskandar Puteri
Attendance: 23,081
Referee: S. Logeswaran

Johor Darul Ta'zim won 6–1 on aggregate.

First leg

18 January 2025
20:15 UTC+8

Sabah	1–1	Sri Pahang
Wilkin 9'	Report	Sherman 66'

Likas Stadium, Kota Kinabalu
Attendance: 10,803
Referee: Zamzaidi Katimin

Second leg

2 February 2025
20:30 UTC+8

Sri Pahang	2–1 (a.e.t.)	Sabah
Park 72' (o.g.); Sherman 107'	Report	Kumaahran 77'

Temerloh Mini Stadium, Temerloh
Attendance: 8,461
Referee: Razlan Joffri Ali

Sri Pahang won 3–2 on aggregate.

== Final ==
The final was played on 26 April 2025 at the Bukit Jalil National Stadium in Kuala Lumpur.

26 April 2025
21:00 UTC+8

Johor Darul Ta'zim	2–1	Sri Pahang
Bérgson 54' (pen.); Arif Aiman 74'	Report	Saravanan 14'

Bukit Jalil National Stadium, Kuala Lumpur
Attendance: 55,552
Referee: Razlan Joffri Ali
