= 2025 Malaysia Cup final =

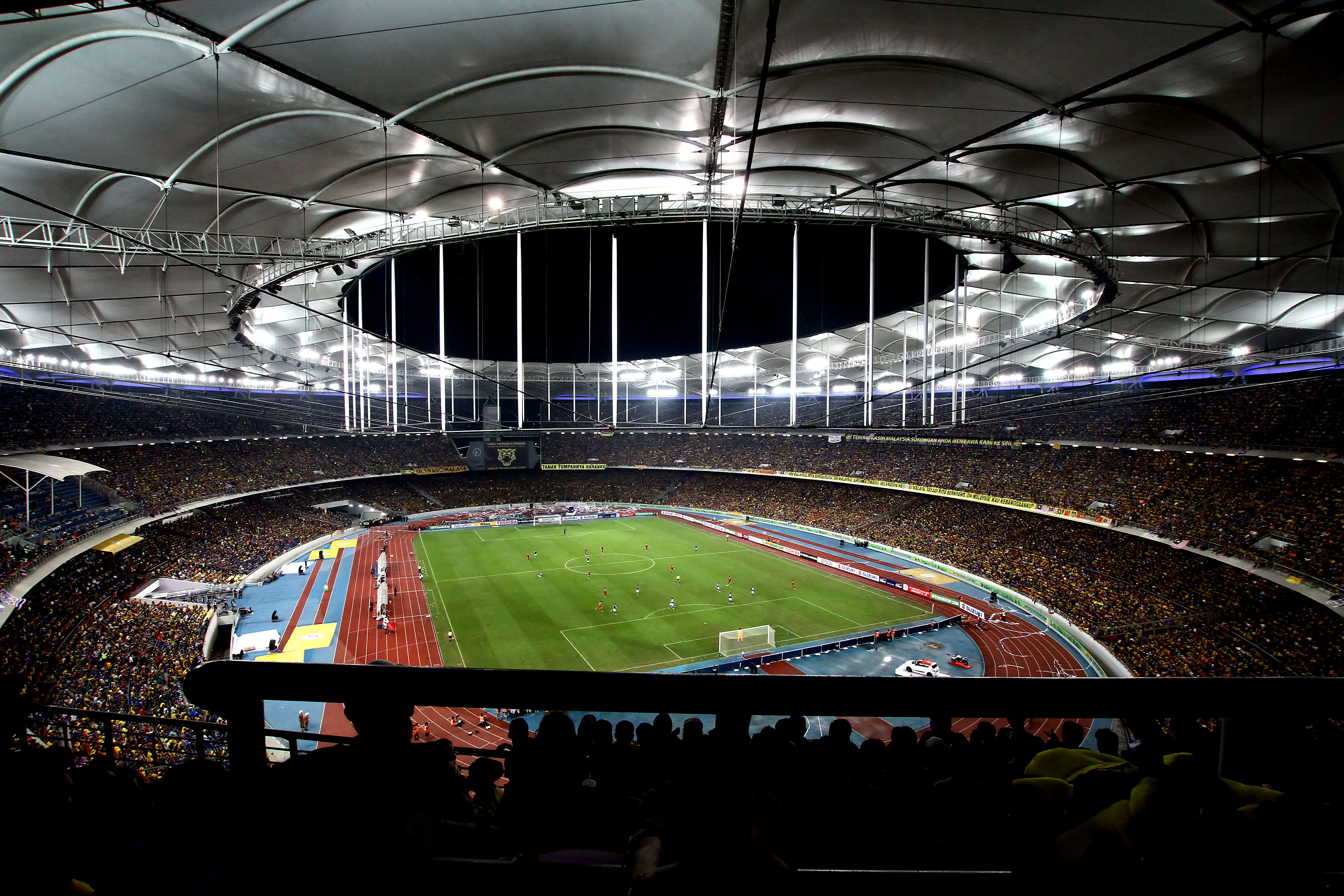
- The match took place at Bukit Jalil National Stadium.
- Event: 2024–25 Malaysia Cup
Johor Darul Ta'zim	Sri Pahang
2	1
- Date: 26 April 2025
- Venue: Bukit Jalil National Stadium, Bukit Jalil, Kuala Lumpur
- Man of the Match: Arif Aiman (Johor Darul Ta'zim)
- Referee: Razlan Joffri Ali
- Attendance: 55,552
- Weather: Good; 27 °C (81 °F)

The 2025 Malaysia Cup final is a football match that was played on 26 April 2025, to determine the champion of the 2024–25 Malaysia Cup. It is the final game of the 98th edition of the Malaysia Cup, organized by the Football Association of Malaysia.

The final is played at the Bukit Jalil National Stadium in Bukit Jalil, Kuala Lumpur. The match was contested by Super League clubs Johor Darul Ta'zim (JDT) and Sri Pahang. The defending champions JDT have appeared in their tenth Malaysia Cup final, making their sixth Bukit Jalil visit since 2014. Sri Pahang appeared in their ninth Malaysia Cup final, their first visit final match to Bukit Jalil since 2018 when they win against Selangor in the 2018 FA Cup final.

Johor Darul Ta'zim won the final 2–1 for their 3rd consecutive time and their 10th title overall.

== Teams ==
In the following table, finals until 1966 were in the Malaya Cup era, and since 1967 were in the Malaysia Cup era.

Team	Previous final appearances (bold indicates winners)
Johor Darul Ta'zim (Note: Previously known as Johor FC)	6 (2014, **2017**, **2019**, 2021, **2022**, **2023**)
Sri Pahang (Note: Previously known as Pahang FA)	8 (**1983**, 1984, **1992**, 1994, 1995, 1997, **2013**, **2014**)

== Route to the final ==
The Malaysia Cup began with 16 teams in a single-elimination knockout cup competition. There were a total of three rounds leading up to the final. Teams were drawn against each other, and the winner after 90 minutes would advance. If still tied, 30 minutes of extra time was played. If the score was still level, a penalty shoot-out was used to determine the winner.

Johor Darul Ta'zim			Round	Sri Pahang
Opponent	Result	Legs		Opponent	Result	Legs
Kuala Lumpur Rovers	9–0	3–0 away; 6–0 home	Round of 16	Selangor	3–2	1–1 home; 2–1 away
Kuala Lumpur City	6–1	2–1 away; 4–0 home	Quarter-finals	Perak	4–3	1–0 away; 3–3 home
Terengganu	6–1	4–0 away; 2–1 home	Semi-finals	Sabah	3–2	1–1 away; 2–1 (a.e.t.) home

== Match ==
=== Details ===
26 April 2025
21:00 UTC+8

Johor Darul Ta'zim	2–1	Sri Pahang
Bérgson 54' (pen.); Arif Aiman 74'	Report	Saravanan 14'

Bukit Jalil National Stadium, Kuala Lumpur
Attendance: 55,552
Referee: Razlan Joffri Ali

**Johor Darul Ta'zim**	**Sri Pahang**

GK	16	(Malaysia) Syihan Hazmi
CB	2	(Malaysia) Matthew Davies
CB	13	(South Korea) Park Jun-heong	(yellow card) 45+5' (yellow-red card) 57'
CB	14	(Azerbaijan) Eddy Israfilov
RM	42	(Malaysia) Arif Aiman
CM	4	(Malaysia) Afiq Fazail		(substituted off) 65'
CM	30	(Malaysia) Natxo Insa (c)		(substituted off) 46'
LM	24	(Philippines) Óscar Arribas		(substituted off) 90+3'
AM	20	(Spain) Juan Muñiz		(substituted off) 46'
CF	9	(Brazil) Bérgson	(yellow card) 34'
CF	37	(Brazil) Heberty
Substitutes:
GK	12	(Malaysia) Christian Abad
DF	3	(Malaysia) Shahrul Saad
DF	22	(Malaysia) Corbin-Ong		(substituted on) 65'
DF	25	(Malaysia) Junior Eldstål
MF	8	(Malaysia) Safiq Rahim
MF	18	(Spain) Iker Undabarrena		(substituted on) 46'
MF	21	(Malaysia) Nazmi Faiz		(substituted on) 90+3'
MF	26	(Malaysia) Mohamadou Sumareh
FW	19	(Malaysia) Romel Morales		(substituted on) 46'
Coach:
(Argentina) Héctor Bidoglio

GK	1	(Malaysia) Zarif Irfan
RB	29	(Malaysia) Azrif Nasrulhaq	(yellow card) 90+4'
CB	3	(Malaysia) Adam Nor Azlin
CB	5	(Serbia) Aleksandar Cvetković
LB	6	(Malaysia) Syazwan Andik		(substituted off) 75'
CM	15	(Argentina) Stefano Brundo (c)
CM	30	(Malaysia) Ibrahim Manusi	(yellow card) 85'	(substituted off) 86'
RM	12	(Malaysia) Baqiuddin Shamsudin	(yellow card) 9'	(substituted off) 75'
AM	16	(Malaysia) Ezequiel Agüero	(yellow card) 32' (yellow-red card) 34'
LM	26	(Malaysia) T. Saravanan		(substituted off) 86'
CF	11	(Ukraine) Mykola Ahapov	(yellow card) 80'
Substitutes:
GK	18	(Malaysia) Azfar Arif
DF	23	(Malaysia) Azwan Aripin		(substituted on) 75'
DF	27	(Malaysia) Fadhli Shas
DF	44	(Malaysia) Hasnul Zaim
MF	4	(Malaysia) Asnan Ahmad
MF	7	(Malaysia) Sean Selvaraj		(substituted on) 75'
MF	20	(Malaysia) Azam Azih		(substituted on) 86'
MF	33	(Malaysia) Saiful Jamaluddin
FW	35	(Malaysia) Syaahir Saiful		(substituted on) 86'
Coach:
(Singapore) Fandi Ahmad

Man of the Match:
Arif Aiman (Johor Darul Ta'zim)

Assistant referees:
Nadziran Eziz
Saharudin Ishak
Fourth official:
Kamil Zakaria
Video assistant referee:
Izzul Fikri
Assistant video assistant referee:
Visnukumar Darmaraj

**Match rules**

- 90 minutes
- 30 minutes of extra time if necessary
- Penalty shoot-out if scores still level
- Nine named substitutes
- Maximum of five substitutions, with a sixth allowed in extra time (Note: Each team was given only three opportunities to make substitutions, with a fourth opportunity in extra time, excluding substitutions made at half-time, before the start of extra time and at half-time in extra time.)

== See also ==
- 2024 Malaysia FA Cup
- 2024–25 MFL Challenge Cup
