= Azeez Arisekola Adam =

Nigerian footballer

Personal information
- Full name: Adam Azeez Arisekola
- Date of birth: 25 August 2003 (age 23)
- Place of birth: Kwara State, Nigeria
- Height: 1.83 m (6 ft 0 in)
- Position: Centre-forward

Team information
- Current team: Kedah FA
- Number: 10

Senior career*
Years	Team	Apps	(Gls)
2024–2025	PT Athletic	18	(7)
2025–	Kedah FA	0	(0)
- * Club domestic league appearances and goals as of 30 January 2026

Adam Azeez Arisekola (born 25 August 2003) is a Nigerian professional footballer who plays as a striker for Malaysian club Kedah FA.

== Club career ==
=== PT Athletic (Putrajaya) ===
In May 2024, Adam joined PT Athletic FC (then known as Putrajaya Athletic) for the 2024–25 Malaysia A1 Semi-Pro League season. He quickly became a key part of the squad, notably scoring four goals in a single match during the early part of the season.

Adam represented the club in the 2024–25 Malaysia Cup, appearing in both legs of the Round of 16 against Malaysia Super League side Sabah.

=== Kedah FA ===
On 28 July 2025, Adam signed with Kedah FA to lead their attack in the Liga A1 Semi-Pro. His transfer was noted by local sports analysts as a strategic move by the "Helang Merah" to strengthen their squad with foreign talent alongside developing local youth players. Upon joining, he expressed his determination to continue his goal-scoring form at the Alor Setar-based club.
