= 2024–25 MFL Challenge Cup =

Piala Cabaran MFL 2024–25

Tournament details
- Country: Malaysia
- Date: 10 December 2024 – 22 February 2025
- Teams: 8

Final positions
- Champions: Selangor
- Runners-up: PDRM

Tournament statistics
- Matches played: 14
- Goals scored: 47 (3.36 per match)
- Top goal scorer(s): (4 goals); Ronnie Fernández

Awards
- Best player: Ronnie Fernández (Selangor)
- All statistics correct as of 22 February 2025.

The 2024–25 MFL Challenge Cup is the fourth edition of Malaysia Challenge Cup tournament organised by Football Association of Malaysia (FAM) and Malaysian Football League (MFL). The tournament began on 10 December 2024 and ended on 22 February 2025. This is the first season of the tournament to have a two-year schedule.

PDRM were defending champions, defeated Kuching City in the final with 4–1 on aggregate, but were eliminated by the eventual winners Selangor in the final.

Selangor clinch their first Challenge Cup title after beating defending champions PDRM 7–0 on aggregate in the final.

== Qualifying rounds ==
A total of 8 teams competed in the knockout phase, which the eight losers of the Malaysia Cup round of 16 will participate into the tournament.

The qualified teams will compete on the knockout stage to compete in a two-legged single-elimination tournament beginning with the quarter-finals followed by semi-finals and the final. Each tie is played on a home-and-away two-legged basis. The away goals rule, extra time and penalty shoot-out are used to decide the winner if necessary.

== Teams ==
All 8 teams eliminated from the Malaysia Cup round of 16 will enter the tournament. List of the teams are shown below:

Key to colours
Losers of round of 16 enter 2024–25 MFL Challenge Cup

Malaysia Cup Round of 16
Team
Kedah Darul Aman
Kelantan Darul Naim
Kuala Lumpur Rovers
Melaka
PDRM
Penang
PT Athletic
Selangor

== Format ==
Each tie in the knockout phase was played over two legs, with each team playing one leg at home. The team that scored more goals on aggregate over the two legs advanced to the next round. If the aggregate score was level, then 30 minutes of extra time was played (the away goals rule was not applied). If the score was still level at the end of extra time, the winners were decided by a penalty shoot-out. In the final, which was played as a single match, if the score was level at the end of normal time, extra time was played, followed by a penalty shoot-out if the score was still level. The mechanism of the draws for each round was as follows:

- In the draws for the quarter-finals onwards, there were no seedings, and teams from the same association could be drawn against each other. As the draws for the quarter-finals and semi-finals were held together before the quarter-finals were played, the identity of the quarter-final winners was not known at the time of the semi-final draw. A draw was also held to determine which semi-final winner would be designated as the "home" team for the final (for administrative purposes as it was played at a neutral venue).

== Schedule ==
The schedule was as follows (all draws were held at the Malaysian Football League headquarters in Petaling Jaya, Selangor).

| Round | First leg | Second leg |
|---|---|---|
| Quarter-finals | 10 & 12–13 December 2024 | 21–23 December 2024 |
| Semi-finals | 18–19 January 2025 | 1–2 February 2025 |
| Final | 15 February 2025 | 22 February 2025 |

== Knockout-stage ==
=== Bracket ===
In the knockout phase, teams played against each other over two legs on a home-and-away basis.

Quarter-finals
Penang | 4 | 2 | 6
PT Athletic | 0 | 0 | 0
Kelantan Darul Naim | 1 | 0 | 1
Selangor | 5 | 3 | 8
PDRM | 2 | 2 | 4
Melaka | 2 | 1 | 3
Kedah Darul Aman | 3 | 3 | 6
Kuala Lumpur Rovers | 0 | 0 | 0

Semi-finals
Penang | 0 | 0 | 0
Selangor | 1 | 1 | 2
PDRM (p) | 3 | 1 | 4 (5)
Kedah Darul Aman | 3 | 1 | 4 (4)

Final
Selangor | 3 | 4 | 7
PDRM | 0 | 0 | 0

=== Quarter-finals ===
The first legs were played on 10, 12 and 13 December, and the second legs were played on 21, 22 and 23 December 2024.

| Team 1 | Agg. | Team 2 | 1st leg | 2nd leg |
|---|---|---|---|---|
| Penang | 6–0 | PT Athletic | 4–0 | 2–0 |
| PDRM | 4–3 | Melaka | 2–2 | 2–1 |
| Kelantan Darul Naim | 1–8 | Selangor | 1–5 | 0–3 |
| Kedah Darul Aman | 6–0 | Kuala Lumpur Rovers | 3–0 | 3–0 |

=== Matches ===
First leg

10 December 2024
20:30

| Penang | 4–0 | PT Athletic |
|---|---|---|
| Rodrigo 20'; Wenzel-Halls 40'; Vitor 62'; Nabil 69' | Report |

City Stadium, George Town
Attendance: 513
Referee: Shamil Jaafar

Second leg

23 December 2024
20:15

| PT Athletic | 0–2 | Penang |
|---|---|---|
| | Report | Vitor 38' (pen.), 45' (pen.) |

City Stadium, George Town (Note: PT Athletic played their home matches at City Stadium, George Town, instead of their regular home stadium MMU Stadium, Cyberjaya respectively, which did not meet MFL requirements.)
Attendance: 354
Referee: Fitri Maskon

Penang won 6–0 on aggregate.

First leg

10 December 2024
21:00

| PDRM | 2–2 | Melaka |
|---|---|---|
| Hadi 62'; Fakhrul 90+5' | Report | Durrkeswaran 25'; Azim 59' (pen.) |

Hang Jebat Stadium, Krubong (Note: PDRM played their home matches at Hang Jebat Stadium, Krubong, instead of their regular home stadium Selayang Municipal Council Stadium, Selayang.)
Attendance: 388
Referee: Nawal Zubir

Second leg

21 December 2024
20:30

| Melaka | 1–2 | PDRM |
|---|---|---|
| Hafiz 59' | Report | Ifedayo 10', 90+2' |

Hang Jebat Stadium, Krubong
Attendance: 600
Referee: Faizal Talib

PDRM won 4–3 on aggregate.

First leg

12 December 2024
21:00

| Kelantan Darul Naim | 1–5 | Selangor |
|---|---|---|
| Arip 70' | Report | Fernández 2', 74'; Mukhairi 37', 48'; Cheng 80' |

MBPJ Stadium, Petaling Jaya (Note: Kelantan Darul Naim will play their home matches at MBPJ Stadium, Petaling Jaya, instead of their regular stadium, Sultan Muhammad IV Stadium, Kota Bharu, which is being renovated.)
Attendance: 842
Referee: Hanis Maani

Second leg

22 December 2024
21:00

| Selangor | 3–0 | Kelantan Darul Naim |
|---|---|---|
| Sharul 10'; Fernández 45+2'; Danial 61' | Report |

MBPJ Stadium, Petaling Jaya
Attendance: 1,397
Referee: Faizudin Ismail

Selangor won 8–1 on aggregate.

First leg

13 December 2024
21:00

| Kedah Darul Aman | 3–0 | Kuala Lumpur Rovers |
|---|---|---|
| Cleylton 40'; Aiman 64'; Assifuah 77' | Report |

Darulaman Stadium, Alor Setar
Attendance: 1,953
Referee: Amirul Yusuf Chow

Second leg

22 December 2024
17:00

| Kuala Lumpur Rovers | 0–3 | Kedah Darul Aman |
|---|---|---|
| | Report | Hasbullah 45'; Aiman 75'; Amirul 90+3' |

Kuala Lumpur Stadium, Cheras
Attendance: 225
Referee: Izwan Abdullah

Kedah Darul Aman won 6–0 on aggregate.

=== Semi-finals ===
The first legs were played on 18 and 19 January, and the second legs were played on 1 and 2 February 2025.

| Team 1 | Agg. | Team 2 | 1st leg | 2nd leg |
|---|---|---|---|---|
| PDRM | 4–4 (5–4 p) | Kedah Darul Aman | 3–3 | 1–1 (a.e.t.) |
| Penang | 0–2 | Selangor | 0–1 | 0–1 |

=== Matches ===
First leg

18 January 2025
21:00

| PDRM | 3–3 | Kedah Darul Aman |
|---|---|---|
| Suzuki 4'; Ifedayo 44'; Eizrul 79' | Report | Gordic 50'; Aiman 53'; Akmal 65' |

Selayang Municipal Council Stadium, Selayang
Attendance: 867
Referee: Izzul Fikri

Second leg

1 February 2025
21:00

| Kedah Darul Aman | 1–1 (a.e.t.) | PDRM |
|---|---|---|
| Amirul 58' | Report | Shafizi 90+7' |
Penalties
| Amirul (penalty scored); Akmal (penalty scored); Fadzrul (penalty scored); Assifuah (penalty scored); Wan Amirul (penalty missed) | 4–5 | Min Oo (penalty scored); Shahrel (penalty scored); Suzuki (penalty scored); Shafizi (penalty scored); Badrul (penalty scored) |

Darulaman Stadium, Alor Setar
Attendance: 3,018
Referee: Kamal Ikhwan Yaacob

4–4 on aggregate; PDRM won 5–4 on penalties.

First leg

19 January 2025
20:30

| Penang | 0–1 | Selangor |
|---|---|---|
| | Report | Vitor 35' (o.g.) |

City Stadium, George Town
Attendance: 2,186
Referee: Nafeez Abd Wahab

Second leg

2 February 2025
21:00

| Selangor | 1–0 | Penang |
|---|---|---|
| Fortes 66' | Report |

MBPJ Stadium, Petaling Jaya
Attendance: 3,310
Referee: Tuan Mohd Yaasin

Selangor won 2–0 on aggregate.

=== Final ===
The first leg was played on 15 February, and the second leg was played on 22 February 2025.

| Team 1 | Agg. | Team 2 | 1st leg | 2nd leg |
|---|---|---|---|---|
| Selangor | 7–0 | PDRM | 3–0 (Note: Selangor defeated PDRM by a score 3–2, but after the decision of the FAM Disciplinary Committee, Selangor was given a 3–0 victory over PDRM for the match.) | 4–0 |

=== Matches ===
First leg

15 February 2025
21:00

| Selangor | 3–0 Awarded (Note: Disciplinary Committee of the Football Association of Malaysia (FAM) awarded Selangor a 3–0 win as a result of PDRM fielding the ineligible player Safiee Ahmad, after Selangor had defeated PDRM by 3–2. Safiee Ahmad failed to serve an automatic one match suspension for receiving two yellow cards earlier in the quarter-finals first leg match against Melaka and the semi-finals second leg match against Kedah Darul Aman.) | PDRM |
|---|---|---|
| Fortes 4', 18'; Olwan 51' | Report | Shahrel 28'; Affendy 39' |

MBPJ Stadium, Petaling Jaya
Attendance: 3,768
Referee: Zamzaidi Katimin

Second leg

22 February 2025
21:00

| PDRM | 0–4 | Selangor |
|---|---|---|
| | Report | Olwan 4'; Orozco 10', 80'; Fernández 31' |

MBPJ Stadium, Petaling Jaya (Note: PDRM played their home matches at MBPJ Stadium, Petaling Jaya, instead of their regular home stadium Selayang Municipal Council Stadium, Selayang.)
Attendance: 2,232
Referee: Nazmi Nasaruddin

Selangor won 7–0 on aggregate.

=== Winner ===
Champions of 2024–25 MFL Challenge Cup

Selangor
First Title

== Statistics ==
=== Top goalscorers ===
| Rank | Player | Club | Goals |
|---|---|---|---|
| 1 | (Chile) Ronnie Fernández | Selangor | 4 |
| 2 | (Malaysia) Aiman Afif | Kedah Darul Aman | 3 |
| 2 | (Nigeria) Ifedayo Olusegun | PDRM | 3 |
| 2 | (Brazil) Rafael Vitor | Penang | 3 |
| 2 | (Cape Verde) Alvin Fortes | Selangor | 3 |
| 6 | (Malaysia) Amirul Hisyam | Kedah Darul Aman | 2 |
| 6 | (Jordan) Ali Olwan | Selangor | 2 |
| 6 | (Malaysia) Mukhairi Ajmal | Selangor | 2 |
| 6 | (Venezuela) Yohandry Orozco | Selangor | 2 |
| 10 | 22 players | 6 clubs | 1 |

=== Own goals ===
| Player | Team | Against | Date | Goal |
|---|---|---|---|---|
| (Brazil) Rafael Vitor | Penang | Selangor | 19 January 2025 | 1 |

== See also ==
- 2024 Piala Sumbangsih
- 2024 Malaysia FA Cup
- 2024–25 Malaysia Cup
- 2024–25 Malaysia Super League
