= Alif Ikmalrizal =

Malaysian professional footballer

Personal information
- Full name: Muhammad Alif Ikmalrizal bin Anuar
- Date of birth: 9 December 2002 (age 23)
- Place of birth: Wakaf Bharu, Kelantan, Malaysia
- Height: 1.78 m (5 ft 10 in)
- Position: Forward

Team information
- Current team: Melaka
- Number: 99

Youth career
- 2023–: Penang II

Senior career*
Years	Team	Apps	(Gls)
2022	Perlis United	0	(0)
2023–2026	Penang	40	(7)
2026–	Melaka		

International career^{‡}
2023	Malaysia U23	8	(3)
- * Club domestic league appearances and goals as of 4 May 2026 ‡ National team caps and goals as of 22 January 2026

Muhammad Alif Ikmalrizal bin Anuar (born 9 December 2002) is a Malaysian professional footballer who plays as a Forward for Malaysia Super League club Melaka.

== Early life ==
Alif Ikmalrizal was born in Wakaf Bharu, Kelantan. He began his football journey with Perlis United at the youth level before securing a move to Penang.

== Club career ==
=== Perlis United ===
On 1 January 2022, Alif signed for Malaysia A1 Semi-Pro League club Perlis United. Alif only played with the youth team of Perlis United for the season but got his first matchday squad list on 17 May 2022 when Perlis United up against Kuching City in Malaysia FA Cup. He did not receive his first appearance with the senior team.

=== Penang ===
Alif joined Penang ahead of the 2023 Malaysia Super League season. He made 13 league appearances and scored 3 goals in his debut year. His breakout moment came in July 2024, when he scored a late stoppage-time goal in a 2–0 win against Perak during the Malaysia Cup.

In the 2024 season, he continued as part of the first team while also appearing for Penang II in the MFL Cup, scoring twice in two appearances, including a brace against Kelantan Darul Naim U23.

On 3 June 2025, Alif extended his contract with Penang for another season.

As of June 2025, Alif has made over 32 league appearances for Penang, contributing 7 goals.

== International career ==
=== Malaysia U23 ===
Alif Ikmalrizal has represented Malaysia at the under-23 level. He participated in the ASEAN U-23 Championship, where he was listed among the top Goalscorer of the tournament with 3 goals.

On 22 August 2023, he made his national team debut in ASEAN U-23 Championship up against Timor Leste U23. He score his first international goals for Malaysia U23 on that day.

== Career statistics ==
As of match played 17 October 2025

Appearances and goals by club, season and competition
Club	Season	League			Cup		League cup		Others		Total	
Club	Season	Division	Apps	Goals	Apps	Goals	Apps	Goals	Apps	Goals	Apps	Goals
Perlis United	2022	Malaysia M3 League	0	0	0	0	0	0	–		0	0
Perlis United	Total		0	0	0	0	0	0	–		0	0
Penang
Penang	2023	Malaysia Super League	13	3	1	0	0	0	-	-	14	3
Penang	2024–25	Malaysia Super League	19	4	2	0	2	0	-	-	23	4
Penang	2025–26	Malaysia Super League	3	0	0	0	1	0	-	-	4	0
Penang	Total		35	7	3	0	3	0	0	0	41	7
Career total			35	7	3	0	3	0	0	0	41	7

== Honours ==
Penang

- MFL Challenge Cup runner-up: 2026

Malaysia U23

- ASEAN U-23 Championship 4th Place: 2023

Individual

- ASEAN U-23 Championship Top Scorer: 2023
- ASEAN U-23 Championship Team of the Tournament: 2023
