= Izzat Zikri =

Malaysian professional footballer

Personal information
- Full name: Muhammad Izzat Zikri bin Iziruddin
- Date of birth: 17 January 2001 (age 25)
- Place of birth: Rompin, Pahang, Malaysia
- Height: 1.65 m (5 ft 5 in)
- Position: Midfielder

Team information
- Current team: Penang
- Number: 80

Senior career*
Years	Team	Apps	(Gls)
2022	FAM-MSN	14	(2)
2023–2025	Penang II	3	(0)
2023–	Penang	37	(1)
- * Club domestic league appearances and goals as of 3 May 2026

Muhammad Izzat Zikri bin Iziruddin (born 17 January 2001) is a Malaysian professional footballer who plays as a Midfielder for Malaysia Super League club Penang.

== Early life ==
Muhammad Izzat Zikri began his football development in Malaysia through grassroots and youth-level training programs. He notably featured for the FAM-MSN Project team, a development squad backed by the Football Association of Malaysia. During his time there, he built a reputation as a technically gifted central midfielder with a strong work ethic.

== Club career ==
=== FAM-MSN ===
In March 2022, Izzat Zikri joined Malaysia Premier League Development Club FAM-MSN Project. FAM-MSN played in Malaysia Premier League to help expose youth player experiences playing in professional league.

On 15th Match 2022, Izzat made his first team debut with the club winning 5–1 in Malaysia FA Cup first round up against TOK Janggut Warriors FC.

On 10 June 2022, Izzat score his first team goal for the club in a 4-1 lose against Malaysia Premier League club UiTM United. He scored on 94' minutes.

=== Penang ===
In February 2024, Izzat Zikri signed a senior contract with Penang, a Malaysia Super League side. He was initially deployed as a rotational player, making substitute appearances in early-season league and FA Cup fixtures.

His breakthrough came in late 2023 when he made his first league start under interim coach Akmal Rizal. On 27 November 2023, Izzat scored his first senior goal, a long-range volley in the 70th minutes during a 3–2 comeback win against Sri Pahang. The goal was widely circulated on social media and even shared by international football pages such as Fodboldworld, an Argentine football content platform.

Before that match, Izzat made headlines for privately reaching out to his former U‑23 coach, Noor Zaidi Rohmat, seeking “restu” (blessing) and forgiveness via WhatsApp. Noor Zaidi encouraged him to stay confident. An exchange that circulated widely and highlighted Izzat's humility.

== Career statistics ==
As of match played 9 June 2025

Appearances and goals by club, season and competition
Club	Season	League			Cup		League cup		Others		Total	
Club	Season	Division	Apps	Goals	Apps	Goals	Apps	Goals	Apps	Goals	Apps	Goals
FAM-MSN Project	2022	Malaysia Premier League	14	2	0	0	2	0	–		16	2
FAM-MSN Project	Total		14	2	0	0	2	0	–		16	2
Penang
Penang	2023	Malaysia Super League	3	1	0	0	0	0	-	-	3	1
Penang	2024–25	Malaysia Super League	20	0	2	0	2	0	-	-	24	0
Penang	2025–26	Malaysia Super League	0	0	0	0	0	0	-	-	0	0
Penang	Total		23	1	2	0	2	0	0	0	27	1
Career total			37	3	2	0	4	0	0	0	37	3

== Honours ==
Penang

- MFL Challenge Cup runner-up: 2026
