= Ezequiel Agüero =

Malaysian footballer (born 1994)

Sergio Agüero
Personal information
- Full name: Sergio Fabian Ezequiel Agüero
- Date of birth: 7 April 1994 (age 32)
- Place of birth: La Rioja, Argentina
- Height: 1.75 m (5 ft 9 in)
- Position: Attacking midfielder

Team information
- Current team: PSM Makassar
- Number: 16

Youth career
- River Plate
- 2013–2015: All Boys

Senior career*
Years	Team	Apps	(Gls)
2015–2016	Tatabányai	22	(10)
2016–2017	Melaka United	8	(0)
2019	Selangor United	6	(3)
2019–2020	Penang	9	(7)
2020	Kuala Lumpur Rovers	5	(2)
2021–2025	Sri Pahang	32	(9)
2021	→ Perak (loan)	15	(2)
2025–2026	Kanchanaburi Power	18	(0)
2026–	PSM Makassar	1	(0)

International career^{‡}
2022–	Malaysia	19	(3)
- * Club domestic league appearances and goals as of 16 October 2026 ‡ National team caps and goals as of 9 October 2025

Sergio Fabian Ezequiel Agüero (born 7 April 1994), commonly known as Sergio Agüero, is a professional footballer who last played as an attacking midfielder for Super League club PSM Makassar. Born in Argentina, he plays for Malaysia national team.

Agüero gained media attention in Southeast Asia during the 2022 AFF Championship for having a similar name to the Argentine former footballer Sergio Agüero.

== Club career ==
=== Tatabányai ===
Agüero started off his professional career at Hungarian club Tatabányai after moving from All Boys in his native country on 31 August 2015.

=== Melaka United ===
On 14 December 2016, Agüero moved to Southeast Asia to joined Malaysia Super League club Melaka United. He make his debut for the club on 27 January 2017 against Selangor where he assisted Khairu Azrin in a 1–1 draw.

=== Sarawak United ===
In January 2019, Agüero signed with Sarawak United.

=== Penang ===
On 22 May 2019, Agüero moved to Penang.

=== Kuala Lumpur Rovers ===
On 1 February 2020, Agüero moved to Liga M3 side Kuala Lumpur Rovers.

=== Sri Pahang ===
In January 2021, Sri Pahang head coach Thomas Dooley insisted on bringing Agüero to the Malaysia Super League club where he signed for the club.

Agüero then returned from his loan move on 30 November 2021 and was part of Sri Pahang squad for the 2022 season.

In the 2024–25 season, Agüero was named as the club captain of Sri Pahang where he guided the team to the 2025 Malaysia Cup final.

==== Loan to Perak ====
On 18 February 2021, Agüero was then loaned to Perak. He then make his debut for the club on 14 March in a 2–0 lost against Terengganu. On May, he scored the only goal in the match to secure a 3 points in a league match against Petaling Jaya City.

=== PSM Makassar ===
On 16 August 2026, Agüero moved to Indonesia and signed with Super League club PSM Makassar ahead of the 2026–27 season, while simultaneously continuing his international duties with the Malaysia national team.

== International career ==
Agüero was called up to the Malaysia national team after obtaining citizenship in 2022. Agüero made his international debut on 9 December 2022 in a 4–0 win over Cambodia in the 2022 AFF Championship at the Bukit Jalil National Stadium.

Agüero scored his first international goal against Laos on 24 December 2022 in the 2022 AFF Championship group stage match at the Bukit Jalil National Stadium. He then scored his second goal against Causeway rivals, Singapore on 3 January 2023.

In June 2024, Agüero was called up for the 2026 FIFA World Cup qualification match where on 11 June, he assisted Safawi Rasid where Malaysia went on to win 3–1 against Chinese Taipei.

=== International goals ===
No.	Date	Venue	Opponent	Score	Result	Competition
1.	24 December 2022	Bukit Jalil National Stadium, Kuala Lumpur, Malaysia	Laos	1–0	5–0	2022 AFF Championship
2.	3 January 2023	Bukit Jalil National Stadium, Kuala Lumpur, Malaysia	Singapore	4–1	4–1	2022 AFF Championship
3.	14 November 2024	PAT Stadium, Bangkok, Thailand	Laos	3–1	3-1	Friendly

== Personal life ==
Agüero has stated that his role models and sources of inspiration are Juan Román Riquelme and Lionel Messi.

== Honours ==
Sri Pahang

- Malaysia Cup runner-up: 2024-25

Malaysia

- Pestabola Merdeka runner-up: 2023

ASEAN All-Stars

- Maybank Challenge Cup: 2025
