= Nazrulerwan Makmor =

Malaysian association football player and manager

Personal information
- Full name: Nazrulerwan bin Makmor
- Date of birth: 4 May 1980 (age 46)
- Place of birth: Seri Kembangan, Selangor, Malaysia
- Height: 1.78 m (5 ft 10 in)
- Position: Defender

Youth career
- 1998: Selangor

Senior career*
Years	Team	Apps	(Gls)
2002	Malacca	11	(1)
2003	Melaka TMFC	7	(1)
2004	Sabah	19	(0)
2005–2006	Selangor	37	(0)
2006–2007	PKNS	16	(1)
2007–2008	KL PLUS	17	(0)
2009–2010	FELDA United	0	(0)
2011	Pahang	6	(0)
2012–2013	Johor		

International career
2007	Malaysia	1	(0)

Managerial career
- 2014–2015: PDRM (assistant)
- 2016: Perlis
- 2017: UiTM (assistant)
- 2018–2020: Puchong Fuerza
- 2021: Kelantan United
- 2022: Melaka United (assistant)
- 2023: Kelantan United (interim)
- 2024–2025: PT Athletic
- * Club domestic league appearances and goals

Nazrulerwan bin Makmor (born 4 May 1980) is a Malaysian football coach and former player.

== Playing career ==
=== Club career ===
Nazrulerwan has represented eight different team in his career before joining Johor. The greatest success he achieved in his career was with Selangor. During the 2005 Malaysia League season, he was in the Selangor squad that won the Malaysian 'treble' (2005 Malaysia Premier League, Malaysia FA Cup and Malaysia Cup). In 2009, he helped Kelantan to play in the final of the 2009 Malaysia Cup but his team lost to Negeri Sembilan 3–1.

A defender by trade, Nazrulerwan's senior playing career spanned over a decade across multiple Malaysian clubs. He began his professional career with Malacca and Sabah before joining Selangor. After his successful stint with Selangor, he went on to play for PKNS, KL PLUS, Felda United, and Pahang, before finishing his playing career with Johor in 2013.

=== International career ===
On the international stage, Nazrulerwan only capped once for Malaysia in the match against Cambodia on 18 June 2007. He also selected in Malaysia 2007 Asian Cup squad but did not play in the tournament.

=== Nazrulerwan Makmor era (2024–2025) ===
Ahead of their debut in the 2024–25 Malaysia A1 Semi-Pro League, the club appointed former national defender Nazrulerwan Makmor as head coach. To ensure immediate competitiveness, management invested heavily in signing high-profile veteran players, including former national team stars Indra Putra Mahayuddin, Amri Yahyah, Syazwan Zainon, and Fandi Othman.

During this period, the club underwent two major identity changes to strengthen its brand and community ties, evolving from Putrajaya Athletic to PT Athletic FC, and finally to Putrajaya Antlers FC in October 2024. On the pitch, Nazrulerwan led the newly assembled squad to a commendable 6th-place finish in the 15-team league. Their league performance also earned them a historic qualification for the 2024–25 Malaysia Cup, though they were eliminated in the Round of 16 following a 7–0 aggregate defeat to Super League side Sabah F.C.

However, the club's ambitious inaugural season was heavily overshadowed by a massive financial crisis. In August 2025, a widespread wage dispute was made public, revealing that the players and staff—including the marquee veteran signings—had not received any salary for 16 months since signing their contracts for the A1 League season. Following failed internal resolutions, affected team members announced plans to file formal police reports against the club's management. The controversy drew immense public scrutiny to the club's financial operations and the treatment of its personnel during Nazrulerwan's tenure.

== Coaching career ==
He began his transition into management as an assistant coach for PDRM FA from 2014 to 2015. He subsequently took on his first major head coach role with Perlis FA in 2016, and later served as an assistant at UiTM FC in 2017. Following his time as the head coach of Puchong Fuerza from 2018 to 2020, Nazrulerwan was appointed as the head coach of Kelantan United F.C. in July 2021, replacing Akira Higashiyama to lead the squad in the Malaysia Premier League.

He served as an assistant coach for Melaka United in 2022 before returning to Kelantan United in 2023. During the 2023 Malaysia Super League season, he was called upon twice to serve as the interim head coach, stabilizing the team during managerial transitions following the respective departures of Tomáš Trucha and Ailton Silva.

In 2024, Nazrulerwan was appointed as the head coach of PT Athletic F.C. (also known as Putrajaya Athletic), a club competing in the Malaysia A1 Semi-Pro League. Under his management, the team had a strong start to the 2024–2025 season. He heavily utilized the experience of veteran former national players to control the tempo of matches, securing key victories and helping the club lead the league standings midway through the campaign.

=== PT Athletic controversy ===
In August 2025, a major wage dispute surfaced at PT Athletic. Reports revealed that players and staff had not received their salaries for nearly 16 months, dating back to the signing of their contracts for the previous A1 League season. The situation escalated when affected team members, unable to resolve the issue through internal discussions with management, announced their intention to file police reports. As the head coach and a central figure at the club, Nazrulerwan faced direct public scrutiny, with frustrated personnel highlighting his role and demanding accountability for the prolonged unpaid wages.
