= Thiago Fernandes (footballer, born 1992) =

Timorese footballer (born 1992)

Personal information
- Full name: Thiago Oliveira Fernandes
- Date of birth: 9 June 1992 (age 34)
- Place of birth: São Paulo, Brazil
- Height: 1.83 m (6 ft 0 in)
- Position: Attacking midfielder

Team information
- Current team: Penang
- Number: 92

Senior career*
Years	Team	Apps	(Gls)
2015	Monte Azul	4	(0)
2015	Budaiya	17	(2)
2016	Persipura Jayapura	14	(0)
2017	Al-Fahaheel	9	(0)
2018	Operário-VG	3	(0)
2018	Gokulam Kerala	16	(0)
2019	Ka I	10	(0)
2021	Fluminense do Itaum	7	(0)
2022	Kirivong Sok Sen Chey	5	(0)
2023	Ulaanbaatar City	13	(0)
2023–2024	Deltras	10	(1)
2024	Dejan	9	(1)
2025	Persikas Subang	8	(3)
2025–2026	Penang	2	(0)

International career
2013	Timor-Leste U23	5	(0)
- * Club domestic league appearances and goals as of 4 May 2026

Thiago Oliveira Fernandes (born 9 June 1992) is a professional footballer who plays as an attacking midfielder for Malaysia Super League club Penang. Born in Brazil, he was an East Timor youth international.

== Club career ==
Before the 2015 season, Fernandes signed for Brazilian second tier side Monte Azul. In 2015, he signed for Budaiya in the Bahraini second tier. Before the 2016 season, he signed for Indonesian top flight club Persipura. Before the second half of 2016–17, Fernandes signed for Al-Fahaheel in Kuwait. Before the 2018 season, he signed for Brazilian top flight team Operário-VG.

In 2019, he signed for Ka I in Macau after trialing for Indian top flight outfit Gokulam Kerala and PSIS in Indonesia. In 2021, Fernandes signed for Brazilian second tier side Fluminense do Itaum. Before the 2022 season, he signed for Kirivong in Cambodia.

=== Penang ===
On 9 June 2025, Fernandes signed for Malaysia Super League club Penang on free transfer.
