= Putrajaya Antlers F.C. =

Malaysian football club

Putrajaya Antlers
- Full name: Putrajaya Antlers Football Club
- Nickname: The Antlers
- Short name: PAFC
- Founded: January 2024; 2 years ago (as Putrajaya Athletic)
- Ground: MMU Stadium; Sepang Municipal Council Mini Stadium
- Capacity: 2,500; 2,000
- Chairman: Tengku Muhammad Rasyadid
- Head coach: Nazrulerwan Makmor
- League: Malaysia A1 Semi-Pro League
- 2024–25: Malaysia A1 Semi-Pro League, 6th of 15
Home colours	Away colours

Putrajaya Antlers Football Club, also known as Antlers, is a professional football club based in Putrajaya, Malaysia. They last played in the second-tier Malaysia A1 Semi-Pro League.

== History ==
Founded in early 2024, PT Athletic FC made club debut in the Malaysian Football League by joining the second-tier MBSB Bank Championship in 2024–25. It is a completely private club, not patronized or funded by the Putrajaya Football Association nor the Putrajaya Corporation.

In a press statement on 14 October 2024, the club announced rebranding as Putrajaya Antlers Football Club (PAFC). The new name has been approved by the Malaysian Sports Commissioner (PJS). "The decision to rebrand this club is part of our ongoing efforts to further strengthen the relationship between the communities in the Federal Territory of Putrajaya and its surroundings and in line with the vision and values that we want to bring the name of Putrajaya in the local and international football arena," wrote a statement by the management of the club.

In their debut season, PT Athletic secured a 6th-place finish out of 15 teams. The team also participated in the Malaysia Cup for the first time, facing Sabah in the round of 16, but was defeated with a 7–0 aggregate score.

== Kit manufacturers and shirt sponsors ==
Season	Kit manufacturer	Main sponsor	Other sponsors
2024–	Cronee Apparel	MBSB Bank; PAG	Extra Joss; NKSA Empire

== Players (2024) ==
Note: Flags indicate national team as defined under FIFA eligibility rules; some limited exceptions apply. Players may hold more than one non-FIFA nationality.

No.	Pos.	Nation	Player
2	DF	MAS	Iqmal Hakim
3	DF	MAS	Fareez Amirul Fadzil
4	DF	MAS	Adib Zainudin
5	DF	MAS	Yusri Yuhasmadi
7	MF	MAS	Dirga Surdi
8	DF	MAS	Faris Shah Rosli
10	DF	NGA	Azeez Arisekola Adam
11	DF	MAS	Qayyum Marjoni
12	GK	MAS	Nik Mohd Amin
13	DF	MAS	Latiff Suhaimi
14	MF	MAS	Ad'dham Mohd Nazrul
15	MF	MAS	Khairul Asyraf
16	DF	MAS	Che Mohamad Arif

No.	Pos.	Nation	Player
17	DF	MAS	Mohd Amri Yahyah
19	FW	MAS	Nurshamil Abd Ghani
22	MF	MAS	Syazwan Zainon
23	MF	MAS	Indra Putra Mahayuddin (captain)
25	GK	MAS	Ilham Amirullah
26	GK	MAS	Amal Muhammad Zarif
27	MF	MAS	Azarul Nazarith
29	MF	MTN	Youssouf Wade
30	GK	MAS	Syakir Danial
32	MF	MAS	S. Veenod
33	MF	MAS	Hafiz Ramdan
35	MF	MAS	Afif Jazimin
71	DF	MAS	Fandi Othman

== Technical staff (2024) ==
- Team manager: Nik Mohd Kifayatullah Nik Din
- Assistant manager: Nik Khuzaimi Nudin
- Head coach: Nazrulerwan Makmor
- Assistant coach: Mohd Ivan Yusoff, Wan Mohd Adha Wan Kamaruzaman
- Goalkeeping coach: Jamsari Sabian
- Goalkeeping coach: Azizon Abdul Kadir
- Fitness coach: Kamarul Dinis Kamarudin
- Physio: Izzati Iznan Azzman
- Media officer: Ahmad Syamil Shamsudin
- Kitman: Noor Nasriq Noorazman, Mohd Fadhli Ikram

== Season by season record ==
Season	Division	Position	Malaysia Cup	Malaysian FA Cup	Malaysian Charity Shield	Regional	Top scorer (all competitions)
2024–25	Liga A1 Semi-Pro	6th of 15	Round of 16	Quarter-finals	–	–	(Malaysia) Mohd Amri Yahyah (13)

Champions	Runners-up	Third place	Promoted	Relegated
