= 2024–25 Malaysia Cup =

Piala Malaysia 2024–25

Tournament details
- Country: Malaysia
- Dates: 20 November 2024 – 26 April 2025
- Teams: 16

Final positions
- Champions: Johor Darul Ta'zim (5th title)
- Runners-up: Sri Pahang

Tournament statistics
- Matches played: 29
- Goals scored: 90 (3.1 per match)
- Top goal scorer(s): (7 goals); Bérgson

The 2024–25 Malaysia Cup (Malay: Piala Malaysia 2024–25), officially known as the Unifi Piala Malaysia 2024–25 for sponsorship reasons, is the 98th edition of Malaysia Cup tournament organised by the Football Association of Malaysia (FAM) and the Malaysian Football League (MFL). This is the second season of the tournament to have a two-year schedule, since the 2007–08 season.

Johor Darul Ta'zim were the defending champions, having beaten Terengganu 3–1 to secure a 4th title in the previous season's final.

== Format ==
In the competition, the top 13 teams from the 2024–25 Malaysia Super League were joined by the top three teams from the 2024–25 Malaysia A1 Semi-Pro League. The competition was played from 20 November 2024 until 26 April 2025, with 16 teams in the knockout stage which began in the round of 16, followed by quarter-finals, semi-finals and the final. This stage was played in two legs, except for the final which was played as a single leg.

== Qualifying rounds ==
For this edition, a total of 16 teams will compete in the tournament, which qualifying results will be determined after week 13 of Super League and after week 14 of A1 Semi-Pro League. The top 8 teams from Super League will automatically qualify to the knockout stage as seeded. Super League teams ranked 9th until 13th and A1 Semi-Pro League teams ranked 1st, 2nd and 3rd placed will be drawn as unseeded. Teams that fail to progress to the quarter-finals will automatically continue the challenge at the 2024–25 MFL Challenge Cup.

== Schedule and draw dates ==
The draw for the 2024–25 Malaysia Cup was held on 11 November 2024.

Phase	Round	First leg	Second leg
Knockout phase	Round of 16	20–24 November 2024	27 & 29–30 November & 1 December 2024
Knockout phase	Quarter-finals	13–15 December 2024	21–23 December 2024
Knockout phase	Semi-finals	17–18 January 2025	1–2 February 2025
Knockout phase	Final	26 April 2025 at Bukit Jalil National Stadium, Kuala Lumpur	

== Seeding ==
The seeded teams were drawn against the unseeded teams, with the seeded teams become hosting for the second leg of round of 16.

For the draw, the teams were seeded and unseeded into two pots based on the following principles (introduced starting this season). The results seeding will be determined after week 13 of Super League and after week 14 of A1 Semi-Pro League:

- Pot A contained the top 8 teams from 2024–25 Super League.
- Pot B contained the 9th until 13th placed teams from 2024–25 Super League, and the 3 teams selected from 2024–25 A1 Semi-Pro League, based on subject approval from the MFL Board of Directors.

Key to colours
Teams from 2024–25 Malaysia Super League
Teams from 2024–25 Malaysia A1 Semi-Pro League

Pot A (seeded)
Rank	Team
1	Johor Darul Ta'zim
2	Selangor
3	Sabah
4	Terengganu
5	PDRM
6	Kuching City
7	Perak
8	Kuala Lumpur City

Pot B (unseeded)
Rank	Team
9	Sri Pahang
10	Kedah Darul Aman
11	Penang
12	Negeri Sembilan
13	Kelantan Darul Naim
14	Melaka
15	PT Athletic
16	Kuala Lumpur Rovers

== Knockout stage ==
In the knockout phase, teams played against each other over two legs on a home-and-away basis, except for the final which was played as a single-leg game.

=== Bracket ===
Round of 16
Negeri Sembilan	1	3	4
PDRM	2	0	2
Melaka	1	0	1
Terengganu	4	0	4
Kedah Darul Aman	3	1	4
Kuala Lumpur City	2	4	6
Kuala Lumpur Rovers	0	0	0
Johor Darul Ta'zim	3	6	9
Penang	0	0	0
Kuching City	1	2	3
PT Athletic	0	0	0
Sabah	4	3	7
Kelantan Darul Naim	0	1	1
Perak	3	3	6
Sri Pahang	1	2	3
Selangor	1	1	2

Quarter-finals
Negeri Sembilan	0	2	2
Terengganu	2	4	6
Kuala Lumpur City	1	0	1
Johor Darul Ta'zim	2	4	6
Kuching City	0	0	0
Sabah	1	0	1
Perak	0	3	3
Sri Pahang	1	3	4

Semi-finals
Terengganu	0	1	1
Johor Darul Ta'zim	4	2	6
Sabah	1	1	2
Sri Pahang (a.e.t.)	1	2	3

Final
Johor Darul Ta'zim	2
Sri Pahang	1

=== Round of 16 ===
The first legs were played on 20 until 24 November, and the second legs were played on 27, 29, 30 November and 1 December 2024. The losers were transferred to the MFL Challenge Cup.

Team 1	Agg.	Team 2	1st leg	2nd leg
Kuala Lumpur Rovers	0–9	Johor Darul Ta'zim	0–3	0–6
Penang	0–3	Kuching City	0–1	0–2
Kedah Darul Aman	4–6	Kuala Lumpur City	3–2	1–4
Kelantan Darul Naim	1–6	Perak	0–3	1–3
PT Athletic	0–7	Sabah	0–4	0–3
Sri Pahang	3–2	Selangor	1–1	2–1
Melaka	1–4	Terengganu	1–4	0–0
Negeri Sembilan	4–2	PDRM	1–2	3–0

=== Quarter-finals ===
The first legs were played on 13, 14 and 15 December, and the second legs were played on 21, 22 and 23 December 2024.

Team 1	Agg.	Team 2	1st leg	2nd leg
Perak	3–4	Sri Pahang	0–1	3–3
Kuala Lumpur City	1–6	Johor Darul Ta'zim	1–2	0–4
Negeri Sembilan	2–6	Terengganu	0–2	2–4
Kuching City	0–1	Sabah	0–1	0–0

=== Semi-finals ===
The first legs were played on 17 and 18 January, and the second legs were played on 1 and 2 February 2025.

Team 1	Agg.	Team 2	1st leg	2nd leg
Terengganu	1–6	Johor Darul Ta'zim	0–4	1–2
Sabah	2–3	Sri Pahang	1–1	1–2 (a.e.t.)

=== Final ===
The final will be played on 26 April 2025 at the Bukit Jalil National Stadium in Kuala Lumpur.

26 April 2025
21:00 UTC+8

Johor Darul Ta'zim	2–1	Sri Pahang
Bérgson 54' (pen.); Arif Aiman 74'	Report	Saravanan 14'

Bukit Jalil National Stadium, Kuala Lumpur
Attendance: 55,552
Referee: Razlan Joffri Ali

== Statistics ==
=== Top goalscorers ===
Rank	Player	Club	Goals
1	(Brazil) Bérgson	Johor Darul Ta'zim	7
2	(Brazil) Heberty	Johor Darul Ta'zim	6
3	(Malaysia) Arif Aiman	Johor Darul Ta'zim	4
3	(Argentina) Manuel Hidalgo	Sri Pahang	4
5	(Malaysia) A. Selvan	Negeri Sembilan	3
5	(Liberia) Kpah Sherman	Sri Pahang	3
5	(Malaysia) Akhyar Rashid	Terengganu	3
5	(Malaysia) Safawi Rasid	Terengganu	3
9	(Haiti) Sony Nordé	Kedah Darul Aman	2
9	(Bosnia and Herzegovina) Jovan Motika	Kuala Lumpur City	2
9	(Malaysia) Ryan Lambert	Kuala Lumpur City	2
9	(Malaysia) Ramadhan Saifullah	Kuching City	2
9	(Malaysia) Hadin Azman	Negeri Sembilan	2
9	(Brazil) Clayton	Perak	2
9	(Malaysia) Daniel Hakimi	Perak	2
9	(Malaysia) Wan Zack Haikal	Perak	2
9	(Malaysia) Stuart Wilkin	Sabah	2
18	35 players	13 clubs	1

=== Own goals ===
Player	Team	Against	Date	Goal
(Malaysia) Yusri Yuhasmadi	PT Athletic	Sabah	23 November 2024	1
(Malaysia) Eizrul Ashraf	PDRM	Negeri Sembilan	29 November 2024	1
(Malaysia) Raffi Nagoorgani	Kuala Lumpur Rovers	Johor Darul Ta'zim	30 November 2024	1
(South Korea) Park Tae-soo	Sabah	Sri Pahang	2 February 2025	1

== See also ==
- 2024 Piala Sumbangsih
- 2024–25 Malaysia Super League
- 2024 Malaysia FA Cup
