= Dylan Wenzel-Halls =

Australian soccer player (born 1997)

Personal information
- Full name: Dylan Wenzel-Halls
- Date of birth: 15 December 1997 (age 28)
- Place of birth: Ipswich, Queensland, Australia
- Height: 1.73 m (5 ft 8 in)
- Position: Striker

Team information
- Current team: Kuching City

Youth career
- Ipswich Knights
- 2003–2004: Olympic FC
- 2016: Brisbane Roar

Senior career*
Years	Team	Apps	(Gls)
2014–2015	Olympic FC	23	(2)
2016	Brisbane Roar NPL	19	(3)
2017–2018	Western Pride	29	(40)
2018	Brisbane Roar NPL	3	(1)
2018–2021	Brisbane Roar	67	(14)
2021–2023	Western United	34	(5)
2023–2024	Central Coast Mariners	8	(3)
2024–2026	Penang	56	(20)
2026–	Kuching City	0	(0)
- * Club domestic league appearances and goals as of 15 June 2026 ‡ National team caps and goals as of 25 November 2016

Dylan Wenzel-Halls (born 15 December 1997) is an Australian professional soccer player who plays for the Malaysia Super League club Kuching City.

== Club career ==
=== Youth career ===
Wenzel-Halls played youth football at local club Ipswich Knights, played in their under-8 team through to under-15 team at Brisbane Lions and then at Olympic FC from 2013 to 2015, and with Brisbane Roar youth in 2016.

=== Western Pride ===
In the 2017 NPL Queensland grand final, Wenzel-Halls scored an 89th-minute free kick against Moreton Bay United, winning the match 2–1 and securing Pride’s first piece of silverware. He was named in the 2017 NPL QLD Team of the Year, and won the 2018 Queensland NPL Golden Boot with 24 goals in 14 games.

While playing for Western Pride, Wenzel-Halls broke the record for the most goals scored in a single National Premier Leagues match, scoring seven goals in a 15–0 win over Sunshine Coast.

=== Brisbane Roar ===
On 4 May 2018, following his goal-scoring exploits in the NPL, Wenzel-Halls signed a one-year contract with A-League club Brisbane Roar.

He made his professional debut on 24 November 2018 against Melbourne City, replacing Matt McKay in injury time with the Roar going on to win the match 2–0.

Wenzel-Halls grabbed his first A-League assist in a 2–1 loss to Adelaide United on 30 November 2018, providing the cutback for Henrique's goal. He scored his first A-League goal in a Round 17 clash with Adelaide United on 2 February 2019, scoring the Roar's second goal as they went down 4–3 at Hindmarsh Stadium.

=== Western United ===
On 20 June 2021, Wenzel-Halls left Brisbane Roar and joined Western United, signing a three-year contract. In his first season he became an A-League Champion, notably scoring and assisting in the Semi-Final to take Western United into their first ever A-League Grand Final. In January 2023, Wenzel-Halls departed the club by mutual consent to allow him pursue another opportunity.

=== Central Coast Mariners ===
A couple of days after leaving Western United, it was announced by Central Coast Mariners that they had signed Wenzel-Halls until the end of the 2024–25 season. Wenzel-Halls made his debut for the Mariners against Brisbane Roar, his first A-League club, on 1 April 2023, after an injury-stalled start to his time at the club. Wenzel-Halls scored his first goal for the Mariners against Western United, his other former club, at Eureka Stadium on 7 April 2023, his second appearance for the Mariners.

Wenzel-Halls was part of the Mariners team that won the 2023–24 A-League, an unused substitute in the 2023 A-League Men Grand Final in which the Mariners won 6–1 against Melbourne City at Western Sydney Stadium.

The following season, Wenzel-Halls was also part of the Mariners' 2023–24 treble winning season, winning the A-League Championship, A-League Premiership and AFC Cup. Wenzel-Halls departed the club in the post-season, to take up an overseas opportunity.

=== Penang ===
Following his departure from Central Coast Mariners, Wenzel-Halls joined Malaysian Super League club Penang on 2 September 2024. On 12 January 2025, he scored his first career hat-trick in a 3–3 draw against Perak at home.

=== Kuching City ===
Wenzel-Halls joined the Sarawak outfit amid interest from other Malaysian and Southeast Asian clubs. He stated on his social media that he was excited for the opportunity to play in continental competitions, as Kuching City had previously finished second in the Malaysia Super League, which enabled the team's participation in the AFC Champions League Two and the ASEAN Club Championship.

== Honours ==
=== Club ===
Western United

- A-League Men Championship: 2021–22

Central Coast Mariners

- A-League Men Championship: 2022–23, 2023–24
- A-League Men Premiership: 2023–24
- AFC Cup: 2023–24

Penang

- MFL Challenge Cup runner-up: 2026
