= Rodrigo Dias (Brazilian footballer) =

Brazilian professional footballer

Personal information
- Full name: Rodrigo da Silva Dias
- Date of birth: 26 January 1994 (age 32)
- Place of birth: Governador Valadares, Brazil
- Height: 1.90 m (6 ft 3 in)
- Position: Forward

Team information
- Current team: Persik Kediri
- Number: 90

Youth career
- 2013–2014: Cruzeiro Academy

Senior career*
Years	Team	Apps	(Gls)
2014–2015	Cruzeiro	1	(0)
2016	Tombense	1	(0)
2016	Palmas	7	(2)
2017	Uberaba	5	(2)
2017	Democrata	15	(7)
2018	Tupi	2	(0)
2018	Nacional de Muriaé	8	(2)
2018	America-RJ	3	(1)
2018–2019	Beira-Mar		
2019	Quang Nam	22	(7)
2020–2023	Thep Xanh Nam Dinh	27	(12)
2023	SHB Da Nang	11	(3)
2023–2024	Khaitan	2	(1)
2024–2025	Penang	22	(10)
2025	PT Prachuap	8	(2)
2026–	Persik Kediri	7	(0)
- * Club domestic league appearances and goals as of 6 April 2026

Rodrigo da Silva Dias (born 26 January 1994) is a Brazilian professional footballer who plays as a forward for Super League club Persik Kediri.

== Youth career ==
Rodrigo Dias was born in Governador Valadares, Brazil. In 2009, he joined Cruzeiro Academy in Brazil.

== Career ==
After developing his football skills at the academy level, he gained his first professional contract in senior team of Cruzeiro.

In 2016, Rodrigo signed with Tombense.

After a short stint he then joined Palma.

In 2017, he then moved to Uberaba, and after playing five league matches moved to Democrata.

In Democrata, he was involved in 15 matches and scored seven times.

After an impressive season in Democrata, in 2018 Rodrigo was offered by Tupi.

After a short stint in Tupi, he then moved to Nacional de Muriaé, where he got eight league matches, and after America RJ gave him a good offer he went to Rio.

Rodrigo joined America RJ for a season long deal.

In June 2018, Rodrigo moved to Portugal and signed with Beira-Mar.

In July 2019, Rodrigo signed with Vietnamese club Quảng Nam.

In 5 March 2024, Rodrigo signed for the Malaysian club Penang F.C. that currently playing in Malaysia Super League.
