= Kuala Lumpur Rovers F.C. =

Malaysian football club

Kuala Lumpur Rovers
- Full name: Kuala Lumpur Rovers Football Club
- Nickname: The Rovers
- Short name: KLR
- Founded: 2020; 6 years ago
- Ground: Kuala Lumpur Stadium, Cheras, Kuala Lumpur
- Capacity: 18,000
- Owner: KL Rovers FC SDN BHD
- Head coach: Wan Mustaffa Wan Ismail
- League: Malaysia A2 Amateur League
- 2025–26: Withdrew
Home colours	Away colours

Kuala Lumpur Rovers Football Club, simply known as KL Rovers, is a football club based in Kuala Lumpur, Malaysia. They last played in the third division of the Malaysian football league system, the Malaysia A2 Amateur League.

== History ==
Kuala Lumpur Rovers was founded in 2020, completing its inaugural season in the 2020 Malaysia M3 League. The club finished the 2022 season as runners-up in the league.

In 2023, the club competed in the Malaysia Cup for the first time in their history. They faced Malaysia Super League club Terengganu but ultimately fell to a 7–0 aggregate defeat.

In 2024, Kuala Lumpur Rovers competed in the Malaysia FA Cup for the first time but suffered a 7–0 hammering from Sabah in the round of 16. The club also participated in the 2024–25 Malaysia Cup facing against Johor Darul Ta'zim.

== Kit manufacturer and shirt sponsor ==
Season	Manufacturer	Sponsor
2020	Kaki Jersi	none
2022	Puma	Activesports
2023	Ma7ch	MBSB Bank / Kuala Lumpur City Hall
2024	FAT Sports	MBSB Bank / Kuala Lumpur City Hall / KL Bandaraya Rendah Karbon

== Players ==
=== First-team squad ===
As of 9 September 2025

Note: Flags indicate national team as defined under FIFA eligibility rules; some limited exceptions apply. Players may hold more than one non-FIFA nationality.

No.	Pos.	Nation	Player
1	GK	MAS	Asyraaf Omar
2	DF	MAS	Amirul Asyraf
3	DF	MAS	Na'qib Sharipuddin
4	DF	MAS	Raffi Nagoorgani
5	FW	MAS	Zainul Arifin
6	MF	MAS	Faiz Mazlan
7	FW	MAS	Sharul Amin
8	MF	MAS	Syamim Yahya
9	FW	MAS	Faizal Hafiq
10	FW	MAS	Rafie Yaacob
11	FW	MAS	Fahmi Sabri
12	DF	MAS	Faizal Arif
13	DF	MAS	Muhammad Aiman Najwan
14	MF	MAS	Amirul Husaini

No.	Pos.	Nation	Player
16	FW	MAS	Izreen Izwandy
17	FW	MAS	Gopi Rizqi
20	DF	MAS	Faris Zabri
21	MF	MAS	Nazirul Hasif
22	DF	MAS	Firdaus Faudzi (captain)
23	FW	MAS	Amirul Nizam
24	MF	MAS	Zahril Azri
25	DF	MAS	Nukman Mohd Fatimi
26	DF	MAS	Amer Saidin
27	DF	MAS	Haritz Rifaee
28	GK	MAS	Aquila Abdul Rhaman
29	GK	MAS	Faisal Saidi
30	FW	MAS	Fakrul Aiman

== Club officials ==
Management
Position	Name
Chairman	(Malaysia) Ashraf Mazlan
CEO	(Malaysia) Mohd Zulfadzlie Ahmad
Director	(Malaysia) Aznor Dzulkarnain Aziz
Team manager	(Malaysia) Shahrir Mois

Coaching staff
Position	Name
Head coach	(Malaysia) Wan Mustafa Wan Ismail
Assistant head coach	(Malaysia) Rashmizan Rasid
Assistant coach	(Malaysia) Daniel Chow Wai Keen
Goalkeeping coach	(Malaysia) Mohd Zaidi Md Zainol
Fitness coach	(Malaysia) Mohd Zahidibudiman Ibrahim
Physio	(Malaysia) Fadli Kamarulzaman
Team security	(Malaysia) Raja Munawir Raja Baharuddin (Malaysia) Airul Azly Jaafar
Kitman	(Malaysia) Muhammad Danish Razarin

== Season by season record ==
Season	Division	Position	Malaysia Cup	Malaysian FA Cup	MFL Challenge Cup	Regional	Top scorer (all competitions)
2020^{1}	Liga M3	Season abandoned	DNQ	Round 2	–	–	(Ivory Coast) Davy Angan (4)
2021	Liga M3	Not held due to COVID-19 pandemic					
2022	Liga M3	Runners-up	DNQ	DNQ	–	–	(Malaysia) Shafiq Shaharudin (12)
2023	Liga M3	Runners-up	Round of 16	DNQ	Quarter-finals	–	(Malaysia) Amer Saidin (12)
2024–25	Liga A1 Semi-Pro	3rd place	Round of 16	Round of 16	Quarter-finals	–	(Malaysia) Amirul Husaini Zamri (13)
2025–26	Liga A2 Amateur	Withdrew					

Champions	Runners-up	Third place	Promoted	Relegated

Notes:'

^1 2020 Season cancelled due to the COVID-19 pandemic, no promotion or league title was awarded.

== Honours ==
=== Domestic competitions ===
- M3 League/A1 League
  - Runners-up (2): 2022, 2023
  - Third place (1): 2024–25
