= 2024–25 Malaysia A1 Semi-Pro League =

MBSB Bank Championship
- Season: 2024–25
- Dates: 1 June 2024 – 22 February 2025
- Champions: Melaka
- Promoted: Melaka; Immigration
- Relegated: Harini
- Matches: 210
- Top goalscorer: Azim Rahim (Melaka, 22 goals)
- Best goalkeeper: Ameerul Eqhwan (Melaka)
- Biggest home win: Kuala Lumpur Rovers 10–1 Machan (17 November 2024)
- Biggest away win: Harini 0–7 YP Maintenance (7 September 2024); Harini 0–7 Melaka (17 November 2024)
- Highest scoring: Kuala Lumpur Rovers 10–1 Machan (17 November 2024)
- Longest winning run: Immigration (9 matches)
- Longest unbeaten run: Immigration (23 matches)
- Longest winless run: Harini (18 matches)
- Longest losing run: Harini (18 matches)
- Highest attendance: 2,590 (Immigration 1–1 Armed Forces) (17 August 2024)
- Lowest attendance: 10 (PIB Shah Alam 0–5 Machan) (20 December 2024)
- Total attendance: 5,443
- Average attendance: 340
- Attendance: 5,443 (26 per match)
- All statistics correct as of 22 February 2025.

The 2024–25 Malaysia A1 Semi-Pro League, also known as 2024–25 MBSB Bank Championship for sponsorship reasons, was the fourth season of the Malaysia A1 Semi-Pro League, currently the second tier football league in Malaysia, since its establishment in 2019.

== Establishment and format ==
The league kicked-off with 15 teams. The top two teams in the middle of the season will qualify for the 2024–25 Malaysia Cup, while the top two at the end of the season will qualify for the 2025–26 Malaysia Super League season. The bottom two teams will be relegated to the Malaysia A2 Amateur League.

== Team changes ==
The following teams have changed division since the 2023 season.

=== To the MBSB Bank Championship ===
Promoted from Al-Ikhsan Cup

- Bunga Raya Damansara
- Machan
- UiTM United
- YPM FC

Promoted from Selangor Champions League

- Gombak

Invited team

- PT Athletic

=== From the MBSB Bank Championship ===
Promoted to Super League

- None^{^{1}}

Relegated to Al-Ikhsan Cup

- Naga UKS

Withdrawn

- Kelantan^{^{2}}
- BRM
- Perlis United^{^{3}}
- SAINS^{^{3}}
- Sarawak United^{^{3}}

=== Name changes ===
- Bunga Raya were renamed to Bunga Raya Damansara and relocated to Damansara, Selangor.

Notes:

^1 No team from 2023 MBSB Bank Championship meet the licensing requirements
^2 Expelled from Super League, withdrawn from MBSB Bank Championship
^3 SAINS, Perlis United & Sarawak United withdrew before the new season of 2024–25 Malaysia A1 Semi-Pro League started.

== Teams ==
15 teams confirmed their participation in the 2024–25 Malaysia A1 Semi-Pro League.

- Armed Forces
- (Penang) Bukit Tambun
- (Selangor) Bunga Raya Damansara
- (Selangor) Gombak
- (Selangor) Harini
- (Putrajaya) Immigration
- Kuala Lumpur Rovers
- (Sarawak) Machan
- (Malaysia) Malaysian University
- (Perak) Manjung City
- (Malacca) Melaka
- (Selangor) PIB Shah Alam
- (Putrajaya) PT Athletic
- (Selangor) UiTM United
- (Pahang) YPM FC

== Locations ==
Locations of teams in the 2024–25 A1 Semi-Pro League

== Venues ==
| Team | Location | Stadium | Capacity |
|---|---|---|---|
| Armed Forces | Kampung Datuk Keramat | Mindef Stadium | 5,000 |
| Bukit Tambun | Bukit Tambun | Penang State Stadium, Batu Kawan | 40,000 |
| Bunga Raya Damansara | Damansara | UiTM Stadium, Shah Alam | 10,000 |
| Gombak | Selayang | Selayang Stadium | 16,000 |
| Harini | Kuala Selangor | Kuala Selangor Main Stadium | 10,000 |
| Immigration | Putrajaya | UKM Bangi Stadium, Bangi | 2,000 |
| Kuala Lumpur Rovers | Cheras, Kuala Lumpur | Kuala Lumpur Stadium | 18,000 |
| Machan | Sibu | Azman Hashim Stadium | 5,000 |
| Malaysian University | Bangi | UKM Bangi Stadium UM Arena Stadium, Kuala Lumpur | 2,000 1,500 |
| Manjung City | Seri Manjung | Manjung Stadium | 15,000 |
| Melaka | Krubong | Hang Jebat Stadium | 40,000 |
| PIB Shah Alam | Shah Alam | USIM Stadium, Nilai | 3,000 |
| PT Athletic | Putrajaya | MMU Stadium, Cyberjaya Sepang Municipal Council Mini Stadium, Sepang | 2,500 2,000 |
| UiTM United | Shah Alam | UiTM Stadium | 10,000 |
| YPM FC | Gambang | SSMP (UMPSA) Mini Stadium | 1,500 |

== Personnel, kits and sponsoring ==
| Team | Head coach | Captain | Kit manufacturer | Sponsor |
|---|---|---|---|---|
| Armed Forces | (England) Kevin Lee Cooper | (Malaysia) Mazni Khairul Hasnan | Hayz En Dos | MBSB Bank |
| Bukit Tambun | (Malaysia) Hasbul Hazani Daud | (Malaysia) Rafiuddin Roddin | Puma | MBSB Bank; Brotherkita |
| Bunga Raya Damansara | (Argentina) Federico Ezequiel Hernandez | (Malaysia) K. Gurusamy | Kovra | MBSB Bank] Shft |
| Gombak | (Malaysia) Fadhil Hashim | (Malaysia) Firdaus Azizul | Let's Play Performance | MBSB Bank] MPS |
| Harini | (Malaysia) K. Ramachandran | (Malaysia) Salamon Raj | Line 7 | MBSB Bank |
| Immigration | (Malaysia) Mat Zan Mat Aris | (Malaysia) Nasriq Baharom | Let's Play Performance | MBSB Bank redONE mobile Zetrix |
| Kuala Lumpur Rovers | (Malaysia) Wan Mustaffa Wan Ismail | (Malaysia) Firdaus Faudzi | FAT Sports | MBSB Bank] Kuala Lumpur City Hall; KL Bandaraya Rendah Karbon |
| Machan | (Malaysia) Edward Unting | (Malaysia) Awang Kamaruddin Awang Bohan | Cronee Apparel | MBSB Bank] Sarawak |
| Malaysian University | (Malaysia) Ridzuan Abu Shah | (Malaysia) Amirul Fazly Zamri | Let's Play Performance | MBSB Bank; Matrix |
| Manjung City | (Malaysia) Ahmad Fairuz Yunus | (Malaysia) Faizzzwan Dorahim | HakkaClo | MBSB Bank] Majlis Perbandaran Manjung |
| Melaka | (Malaysia) K. Devan | (Malaysia) Nasir Basharudin | Puma | Zahara Exclusive; MBSB Bank; Malacca City Council |
| PIB Shah Alam | (Malaysia) Muhamad Azrin Mohamed | (Malaysia) Idris Ahmad | AL Sports | MBSB Bank |
| PT Athletic | (Malaysia) Nazrulerwan Makmor | (Malaysia) Indra Putra | Cronee Apparel | MBSB Bank] PAG |
| UiTM United | (Malaysia) Yazli Yahaya | (Malaysia) Ahmad Haikal | Let's Play Performance | MBSB Bank |
| YPM FC | (Malaysia) Mohammad Zerry Nazeri | (Malaysia) Syawal Norsam | Legasi 06 | MBSB Bank; YP Maintenance Sdn.Bhd. Juta1 |

=== Coaching changes ===
Note: Flags indicate national team as has been defined under FIFA eligibility rules. Players may hold more than one non-FIFA nationality.

| Team | Outgoing coach | Manner of departure | Date of vacancy | Position in table | Incoming coach | Date of appointment |
|---|---|---|---|---|---|---|
| Harini | (Malaysia) Maniam Pachaiappan | Mutual Agreement | 6 April 2024 | | (Malaysia) K. Ramachandran | |
| Machan | (Malaysia) S. Balachandran | Mutual Agreement | | | (Malaysia) Mohd Bakri Neemat | |
| Gombak | (Malaysia) Shahrom Kalam | | | | (Malaysia) Fadhil Hashim | |
| Manjung City | (Malaysia) Rafae Isa | | | | (Malaysia) Ahmad Fairuz Yunus | |
| Bukit Tambun | (Malaysia) Jacob Joseph | | | | (Malaysia) Hasbul Hazani Daud | |

== Foreign players ==
The number of foreign players is restricted to two per each team.

Note: Flags indicate national team as has been defined under FIFA eligibility rules. Players may hold more than one non-FIFA nationality.

| Team | U21 player 1 | U21 player 2 | Player 3^2 | Player 4^2 | Former player ^{1} |
|---|---|---|---|---|---|
| Armed Forces | (Ghana) **Ogolo Williams Wisdom** | | —N/a | —N/a | |
| Bukit Tambun | | | —N/a | —N/a | |
| Bunga Raya Damansara | (Argentina) **Nicolas Damian Insaurralde** | (Argentina) Nicolas Vargas Valinotti | —N/a | —N/a | (Argentina) Ignacio Sequeira |
| Gombak | (Brazil) Vinicius Amaral | (Brazil) **Emanuel Corvelloni Nascimento** | —N/a | —N/a | (Japan) Patrik Majeski |
| Harini | | | —N/a | —N/a | (Ghana) Ogolo Williams Wisdom (Ghana) Joseph Akegie Sogbe |
| Immigration | (Brazil) Felipe de Lima Ribeiro | (Nigeria) Thankgod Michael | —N/a | —N/a | |
| Kuala Lumpur Rovers | (South Korea) **Moon Si-hyun** | (South Korea) **Lee Ju-hang** | | | |
| Machan | | | —N/a | —N/a | |
| Malaysian University | | | —N/a | —N/a | |
| Manjung City | (Australia) **Kayden Soper** | (South Korea) **Seok Ui-jun** | —N/a | —N/a | |
| Melaka | (Ghana) Fuseini Issah | (Nigeria) Michael Onyekachi Ozor | (Nigeria) **Oumar Bangoura** | (France) **Rodrigue Nanitelamio** | |
| PIB Shah Alam | | | —N/a | —N/a | |
| PT Athletic | (Mauritania) Youssouf Wade | (Nigeria) Azeez Arisekola Adam | | | |
| UiTM United | | | —N/a | —N/a | |
| YP Maintenance | | | —N/a | —N/a | |

- Players name in **bold** indicates that the player was registered during the mid-season transfer window.
- **^1** Foreign players who left their teams or were de-registered from the playing squad due to medical issues or other matters.
- **^2** These imported players can only play in the Malaysia Cup or the MFL Challenge Cup.

== Standings ==
=== League table ===
| Pos | Team | Pld | W | D | L | GF | GA | GD | Pts | Qualification or relegation |
|---|---|---|---|---|---|---|---|---|---|---|
| 1 | Melaka (C) | 28 | 22 | 5 | 1 | 81 | 13 | +68 | 71 | Promoted to the 2025–26 Malaysia Super League & qualification to 2024–25 Malaysia Cup |
| 2 | Immigration | 28 | 18 | 9 | 1 | 62 | 20 | +42 | 63 | Promoted to 2025–26 Malaysia Super League |
| 3 | Kuala Lumpur Rovers | 28 | 16 | 8 | 4 | 54 | 24 | +30 | 56 | Qualified to 2024–25 Malaysia Cup & Relegated to A2 Amateur League |
| 4 | Bunga Raya Damansara | 28 | 17 | 4 | 7 | 60 | 26 | +34 | 55 | |
| 5 | Malaysian University | 28 | 14 | 6 | 8 | 63 | 31 | +32 | 48 | |
| 6 | PT Athletic | 28 | 14 | 4 | 10 | 60 | 44 | +16 | 46 | Qualified to 2024–25 Malaysia Cup; Withdrawn from A1 Semi-Pro League |
| 7 | Gombak | 28 | 11 | 9 | 8 | 45 | 35 | +10 | 42 | Withdrawn from A1 Semi-Pro League |
| 8 | Armed Forces | 28 | 10 | 8 | 10 | 42 | 38 | +4 | 38 | |
| 9 | Manjung City | 28 | 10 | 7 | 11 | 45 | 47 | −2 | 37 | |
| 10 | YPM FC | 28 | 8 | 6 | 14 | 45 | 45 | 0 | 30 | Relegated to A2 Amateur League |
| 11 | Bukit Tambun | 28 | 9 | 3 | 16 | 46 | 65 | −19 | 30 | Withdrawn from A1 Semi-Pro League |
| 12 | PIB Shah Alam | 28 | 8 | 4 | 16 | 34 | 80 | −46 | 28 | Withdrawn from A1 Semi-Pro League |
| 13 | UiTM United | 28 | 8 | 3 | 17 | 42 | 61 | −19 | 27 | Relegated to A2 Amateur League |
| 14 | Machan | 28 | 4 | 2 | 22 | 29 | 94 | −65 | 14 | |
| 15 | Harini | 28 | 1 | 2 | 25 | 28 | 113 | −85 | 5 | Relegated to A2 Amateur League |

Source: FAM-CMS
Rules for classification: 1) Points; 2) Goal difference; 3) Number of goals scored.
(C) League champion

=== Position by round ===
| Team ╲ Round | 1 | 2 | 3 | 4 | 5 | 6 | 7 | 8 | 9 | 10 | 11 | 12 | 13 | 14 | 15 | 16 | 17 | 18 | 19 | 20 | 21 | 22 | 23 | 24 | 25 | 26 | 27 | 28 | 29 | 30 |
|---|---|---|---|---|---|---|---|---|---|---|---|---|---|---|---|---|---|---|---|---|---|---|---|---|---|---|---|---|---|---|
| Melaka | 2 | 5 | 4 | 4 | 2 | 1 | 2 | 2 | 2 | 1 | 1 | 1 | 2 | 2 | 1 | 1 | 1 | 1 | 1 | 1 | 1 | 1 | 1 | 1 | 1 | 1 | 1 | 1 | 1 | 1 |
| Immigration | 3 | 2 | 2 | 3 | 1 | 2 | 1 | 1 | 1 | 3 | 4 | 3 | 4 | 5 | 4 | 3 | 3 | 3 | 3 | 3 | 2 | 2 | 2 | 2 | 2 | 2 | 2 | 2 | 2 | 2 |
| KL Rovers | 6 | 3 | 3 | 1 | 4 | 3 | 3 | 4 | 3 | 2 | 3 | 4 | 5 | 3 | 3 | 2 | 2 | 2 | 2 | 2 | 3 | 3 | 3 | 4 | 3 | 4 | 4 | 3 | 3 | 3 |
| BR Damansara | 1 | 1 | 1 | 2 | 3 | 4 | 5 | 3 | 7 | 7 | 5 | 5 | 3 | 4 | 5 | 4 | 4 | 4 | 5 | 5 | 5 | 4 | 4 | 3 | 4 | 3 | 3 | 4 | 4 | 4 |
| MUFT | 12 | 13 | 9 | 7 | 5 | 7 | 7 | 7 | 6 | 6 | 6 | 7 | 7 | 9 | 7 | 6 | 6 | 6 | 6 | 6 | 6 | 6 | 6 | 6 | 6 | 6 | 6 | 6 | 5 | 5 |
| PT Athletic | 7 | 7 | 7 | 5 | 7 | 6 | 6 | 5 | 4 | 4 | 2 | 2 | 1 | 1 | 2 | 5 | 5 | 5 | 4 | 4 | 4 | 5 | 5 | 5 | 5 | 5 | 5 | 5 | 6 | 6 |
| Gombak | 4 | 6 | 6 | 8 | 9 | 9 | 8 | 8 | 9 | 8 | 8 | 8 | 8 | 8 | 8 | 8 | 8 | 8 | 8 | 7 | 7 | 7 | 7 | 7 | 7 | 7 | 7 | 7 | 7 | 7 |
| Armed Forces | 9 | 11 | 10 | 10 | 11 | 10 | 11 | 9 | 10 | 11 | 11 | 11 | 11 | 11 | 11 | 11 | 11 | 11 | 11 | 11 | 11 | 9 | 8 | 8 | 9 | 8 | 8 | 8 | 8 | 8 |
| Manjung City | 5 | 4 | 5 | 6 | 8 | 8 | 9 | 10 | 8 | 9 | 9 | 9 | 10 | 10 | 10 | 10 | 10 | 10 | 10 | 10 | 10 | 8 | 10 | 9 | 8 | 9 | 9 | 9 | 9 | 9 |
| YPM | 11 | 12 | 13 | 14 | 13 | 13 | 10 | 12 | 13 | 13 | 13 | 12 | 12 | 12 | 12 | 12 | 12 | 12 | 12 | 12 | 12 | 12 | 12 | 12 | 12 | 12 | 12 | 10 | 10 | 10 |
| Bukit Tambun | 10 | 10 | 14 | 11 | 10 | 11 | 12 | 13 | 11 | 10 | 10 | 10 | 9 | 7 | 9 | 9 | 9 | 9 | 9 | 9 | 9 | 11 | 9 | 10 | 10 | 10 | 10 | 11 | 11 | 11 |
| PIB Shah Alam | 13 | 8 | 8 | 9 | 6 | 5 | 4 | 6 | 5 | 5 | 7 | 6 | 6 | 6 | 6 | 7 | 7 | 7 | 7 | 8 | 8 | 10 | 11 | 11 | 11 | 11 | 11 | 12 | 13 | 12 |
| UiTM United | 14 | 14 | 12 | 12 | 14 | 15 | 14 | 14 | 14 | 15 | 15 | 14 | 14 | 14 | 14 | 14 | 13 | 13 | 13 | 13 | 13 | 13 | 14 | 14 | 13 | 13 | 13 | 13 | 12 | 13 |
| Machan | 8 | 9 | 15 | 15 | 12 | 12 | 13 | 11 | 12 | 12 | 12 | 13 | 13 | 13 | 13 | 13 | 14 | 14 | 14 | 14 | 14 | 14 | 13 | 13 | 14 | 14 | 14 | 14 | 14 | 14 |
| Harini | 15 | 15 | 11 | 13 | 15 | 14 | 15 | 15 | 15 | 14 | 14 | 15 | 15 | 15 | 15 | 15 | 15 | 15 | 15 | 15 | 15 | 15 | 15 | 15 | 15 | 15 | 15 | 15 | 15 | 15 |

| Leader & qualification for Malaysia Super League |
| Qualification for Malaysia Super League |
| Relegation to Al-Ikhsan Cup |

Source: AFL

== Results table ==
| Home \ Away | AFC | BUT | BGR | GOM | HAR | IMI | KLR | MAC | MAU | MCT | MEL | PIB | PTA | UIT | YPM |
|---|---|---|---|---|---|---|---|---|---|---|---|---|---|---|---|
| Armed Forces | | 3–0 | 1–2 | 1–0 | 4–0 | 1–1 | 0–2 | 1–1 | 0–3 | 1–1 | 0–1 | 8–0 | 0–3 | 1–0 | 1–1 |
| Bukit Tambun | 3–0 | | 0–4 | 0–0 | 7–1 | 1–2 | 1–1 | 2–0 | 0–5 | 4–1 | 0–1 | 3–1 | 1–3 | 4–1 | 1–3 |
| Bunga Raya Damansara | 3–1 | 3–0 | | 2–0 | 4–0 | 1–1 | 0–1 | 6–1 | 2–0 | 2–0 | 1–6 | 1–2 | 1–1 | 2–0 | 1–1 |
| Gombak | 2–2 | 2–1 | 0–4 | | 2–0 | 1–1 | 0–1 | 2–1 | 2–4 | 1–1 | 0–0 | 3–0 | 1–0 | 5–0 | 2–4 |
| Harini | 1–2 | 4–6 | 0–2 | 2–6 | | 1–2 | 1–2 | 0–0 | 0–6 | 0–7 | 0–7 | 2–5 | 1–1 | 1–0 | 0–7 |
| Immigration | 1–1 | 4–0 | 1–0 | 1–2 | 2–1 | | 2–0 | 4–2 | 1–0 | 4–0 | 1–1 | 1–1 | 3–1 | 3–1 | 2–1 |
| Kuala Lumpur Rovers | 1–0 | 2–1 | 3–0 | 2–2 | 6–0 | 0–0 | | 10–1 | 0–0 | 1–1 | 1–1 | 3–0 | 5–2 | 1–0 | 1–0 |
| Machan | 0–4 | 1–3 | 1–2 | 1–4 | 4–3 | 1–6 | 2–0 | | 0–6 | 0–1 | 0–4 | 2–1 | 3–6 | 0–6 | 0–2 |
| Malaysian University | 0–0 | 2–0 | 0–1 | 1–1 | 3–1 | 1–2 | 2–2 | 3–0 | | 2–2 | 0–4 | 2–4 | 3–0 | 2–0 | 4–2 |
| Manjung City | 0–1 | 6–2 | 1–0 | 1–2 | 5–2 | 1–1 | 0–1 | 4–0 | 1–4 | | 0–2 | 0–2 | 1–1 | 2–2 | 2–1 |
| Melaka | 5–1 | 4–0 | 1–0 | 0–0 | 3–1 | 0–0 | 3–1 | 7–2 | 2–0 | 7–0 | | 3–0 | 3–2 | 4–0 | 3–0 |
| PIB Shah Alam | 3–1 | 2–2 | 0–8 | 1–0 | 6–4 | 0–8 | 0–0 | 0–5 | 0–6 | 0–4 | 1–4 | | 0–2 | 1–1 | 0–1 |
| PT Athletic | 1–3 | 3–1 | 1–2 | 0–2 | 4–1 | 1–2 | 2–3 | 2–1 | 1–0 | 4–0 | 1–0 | 4–3 | | 3–0 | 2–2 |
| UiTM United | 1–2 | 5–1 | 2–5 | 3–2 | 6–0 | 0–3 | 1–4 | 2–0 | 2–2 | 0–2 | 0–3 | 2–0 | 1–5 | | 2–0 |
| YPM FC | 2–2 | 1–2 | 1–1 | 1–1 | 4–1 | 0–3 | 2–0 | 3–0 | 1–2 | 0–1 | 1–2 | 0–1 | 1–4 | 3–4 | |

Updated to match(es) played on 22 February 2025. Source: FAM-CMS
Legend: Blue = home team win; Yellow = draw; Red = away team win.
For upcoming matches, an "a" indicates there is an article about the rivalry between the two participants.

=== Results by match played ===
| Team ╲ Round | 1 | 2 | 3 | 4 | 5 | 6 | 7 | 8 | 9 | 10 | 11 | 12 | 13 | 14 | 15 | 16 | 17 | 18 | 19 | 20 | 21 | 22 | 23 | 24 | 25 | 26 | 27 | 28 | 29 | 30 |
|---|---|---|---|---|---|---|---|---|---|---|---|---|---|---|---|---|---|---|---|---|---|---|---|---|---|---|---|---|---|---|
| Armed Forces | L | L | D | W | L | D | L | W | L | D | D | L | L | – | W | L | L | W | W | W | D | W | W | D | D | W | L | W | – | D |
| Bukit Tambun | L | L | L | D | W | L | L | L | W | W | L | W | W | W | – | D | L | L | W | L | D | L | L | W | L | L | L | L | W | – |
| BR Damansara | W | W | W | D | D | – | D | W | L | L | W | W | W | L | W | W | W | W | L | D | – | W | W | W | L | W | W | L | L | W |
| Gombak | W | D | D | – | L | L | W | D | L | W | D | W | W | W | L | D | D | L | – | D | W | W | L | D | W | W | D | L | W | L |
| Harini | L | L | D | L | L | D | L | L | L | W | – | L | L | L | L | L | L | L | L | L | L | L | L | L | L | – | L | L | L | L |
| Immigration | W | W | W | D | W | W | W | D | – | D | D | D | D | D | W | W | W | W | W | W | W | W | W | – | D | L | W | D | W | W |
| KL Rovers | W | W | D | W | L | W | D | D | W | W | D | – | D | W | W | W | W | W | W | W | D | D | L | D | W | L | – | W | L | W |
| Machan | L | L | L | L | W | D | L | W | L | L | D | L | – | L | L | L | L | L | L | L | W | L | W | L | L | L | L | – | L | L |
| MUFT | W | – | L | W | W | L | D | W | W | L | D | L | W | L | W | W | – | L | W | D | L | D | W | D | L | W | W | W | W | D |
| Manjung City | W | W | D | L | L | L | D | – | W | L | D | L | L | D | L | W | W | L | L | W | D | W | – | W | W | L | D | W | L | D |
| Melaka | W | D | W | W | W | W | – | L | W | W | D | W | D | W | W | W | D | W | W | W | W | – | W | W | W | W | W | D | W | W |
| PIB Shah Alam | L | W | D | D | W | W | W | L | W | – | L | D | D | W | W | L | L | L | L | L | L | L | L | L | – | L | L | L | L | W |
| PT Athletic | – | W | D | W | L | W | D | W | W | W | W | W | W | L | L | – | W | W | W | L | D | L | L | W | D | W | L | L | L | L |
| UiTM United | L | L | D | L | – | L | D | L | L | L | W | L | L | W | L | L | L | W | L | – | L | L | L | L | W | W | W | W | W | D |
| YPM FC | L | L | – | L | D | D | W | D | L | L | L | W | L | L | L | L | W | – | L | D | D | W | W | L | D | L | W | W | W | L |

Updated to match(es) played on 22 February 2025. Source: FAM
W = Win; D = Draw; L = Lose

== Fixtures and results ==
Round 1

=== Matchweek 1 ===
| 1 June 2024 | PIB Shah Alam | 1–4 | Melaka | Nilai |
| 16:45 UTC+8 | Aiman (yellow card) 21'; Syukri 30' | Report | Nasir 7'; Issah 38'; Issah (yellow card) 39'; Haziq (yellow card) 49'; Azim Rahim 83'; Nizaruddin 90' | Stadium: USIM Stadium; Attendance: 100; Referee: Izzul Fikri Kamaruzaman |

| 1 June 2024 | UiTM United | 0–3 | Immigration | Shah Alam |
| 20:45 UTC+8 | Wan Irfan (red card) 51' | Report | Hazim 30'; Thankgod Michael 45'; Nasriq 55'; Afiq Azuan (yellow card) 85'; Alif Romli (yellow card) 90+3' | Stadium: UiTM Stadium; Attendance: 1100; Referee: Mohd Sufi Lion@Rozan |

| 1 June 2024 | Manjung City | 2–1 | YP Maintenance | Seri Manjung |
| 20:45 UTC+8 | Syamin 30'; Muazzim (yellow card) 47'; Wan Izzat (yellow card) 56'; Saifuddin 84' | Report | Helmi (yellow card) 45'; Syawal (yellow card) 69'; Hilmi Husaini 87' | Stadium: Manjung Stadium; Attendance: 477; Referee: Abu Bakar Ghazali |

| 1 June 2024 | Gombak | 2–1 | Bukit Tambun | Selayang |
| 20:45 UTC+8 | Sukri 61'; Vinicius Amaral 82'; Vinicius Amaral (yellow card) 90+3' | Report | Syazwi 34'; Akmal Rizal (yellow card) 90+1' | Stadium: Selayang Stadium; Attendance: 610; Referee: Zulkarnain Zakaria |

| 2 June 2024 | Bunga Raya Damansara | 4–0 | Harini | Kelana Jaya |
| 16:45 UTC+8 | Prabakaran (yellow card) 50'; Sequeira 73'; R.Kogileswaran 78'; Thivandaran (yellow card) 81'; D.Kugan 87'; K.Kannan (yellow card) 90+2'; M. Devekumaran 90+5' | Report | | Stadium: PKNS Football Field; Attendance: 253; Referee: S. Logeswaran |

| 2 June 2024 | Kuala Lumpur Rovers | 1–0 | Armed Forces | Cheras, Kuala Lumpur |
| 20:45 UTC+8 | Nazirul Hasif (yellow card) 3'; Fakrul Aiman 8'; Amer Saidin (yellow card) 45'; Fahmi Sabri (yellow card) 64'; Faris Zabri (yellow card) 90'; Firdaus Faudzi (red card) 90+2' | Report | Faiz Ibrahim (yellow card) 11'; Fakhrul Izwan (yellow card) 16'; Azrul Aznan (yellow card) 33'; Daniel (yellow card) 90+7' | Stadium: Kuala Lumpur Stadium; Attendance: 236; Referee: Razlan Joffri Ali |

| 9 July 2024 | Malaysian University | 3–0 | Machan | Bangi |
| 16:45 UTC+8 | Zulkarnain Nasir 32' (pen.); Nashran Elias 43'; Saiful Iskandar 88' | Report | | Stadium: UKM Bangi Stadium; Attendance: 80; Referee: Zulkarnain bin Zakaria |

=== Matchweek 2 ===
| 8 June 2024 | Machan | 0–1 | Manjung City | Kuching |
| 16:15 UTC+8 | Awang Kamaruddin (yellow card) 27'; Adif (yellow card) 84'; Rames Lai (yellow card) 87' | Report | Mohd Syamin 18'; Khairul Amizan (yellow card) 84'; Syafiq Izzudin (yellow card) 90+2' | Stadium: Sarawak State Stadium; Attendance: 500; Referee: Dowvlern Anak Retain |

| 8 June 2024 | YP Maintenance | 0–1 | PIB Shah Alam | Gambang |
| 16:45 UTC+8 | Syawal Norsam (yellow card) 45+1' | Report | Danial Ashraf 5'; Izzat (yellow card) 88' | Stadium: SSMP (UMPSA) Mini Stadium; Attendance: 142; Referee: Tuan Mohd Faizrullah |

| 8 June 2024 | PT Athletic | 3–1 | Bukit Tambun | Cyberjaya |
| 16:45 UTC+8 | Amri Yahyah 45+1', 90+5'; Latiff Suhaimi (yellow card) 46'; Adib Zainudin (yellow card) 51'; Indra Putra 61' | Report | Sadam Hashim (yellow card) 27'; Syafiq Heelmi 90+3' | Stadium: MMU Stadium; Attendance: 263; Referee: Mohd Fusser Bin Mad Sallih |

| 8 June 2024 | Armed Forces | 1–2 | Bunga Raya Damansara | Kuala Lumpur |
| 16:45 UTC+8 | Faiz Ibrahim (yellow card) 36'; Fakrul Izwan (yellow card) 60'; Shahrul Aznei 62'; Shahrizan (yellow card) 90+1' | Report | K. Gurusamy (yellow card) 20'; Sunil Chandran (yellow card) 38'; Kogileswaran Raj 26', (yellow card) 60'; Sachin Samuel 40'; Nicolas (yellow card) 80' | Stadium: Mindef Stadium; Attendance: 180; Referee: Jeevanathan M. Ponniamoorthya |

| 8 June 2024 | Melaka | 0–0 | Gombak | Krubong |
| 20:45 UTC+8 | Azim Rahim (yellow card) 62'; Haziq Puad (yellow card) 87'; Zulkifli (yellow card) 90' | Report | Saiful (yellow card) 15'; Sukri (yellow card) 43'; Vinícius Amaral (yellow card) 83' | Stadium: Hang Jebat Stadium; Attendance: 500; Referee: Mohd Sarif Bin Tahir |

| 8 June 2024 | UiTM United | 1–4 | Kuala Lumpur Rovers | Shah Alam |
| 20:45 UTC+8 | Fakhrur Razi ((Pen.)90+3); Syaizwan (yellow card) 62' | Report | Fakrul Aiman 5'; Faiz Mazlan 21'; Sharul Amin 34'; Rafie 45'; Amer Saidin (yellow card) 62' | Stadium: UiTM Stadium; Attendance: 500; Referee: Jubik Bin Andangon |

| 9 June 2024 | Harini | 1–2 | Immigration | Kuala Selangor |
| 16:45 UTC+8 | William Ogolo 30'; Amierul Ismail (yellow card) 73'; R. Gopinath (yellow card) 85'; Iqmal Harun (yellow card) 88' | Report | Nasriq (yellow card) 14'; Thankgod Michael 24', 31'; Adib Faris (yellow card) 34'; Hafiz Kamal (yellow card) 38'; Ashmawi Yakin (yellow card) 62'; Afiq Azuan (yellow card) 67' | Stadium: Kuala Selangor Stadium; Attendance: 72; Referee: Zulkarnain Bin Zakaria |

=== Matchweek 3 ===
| 22 June 2024 | Harini | 1–1 | PT Athletic | Kuala Selangor |
| 16:45 UTC+8 | G. Thipen Raj 56' | Report | Amri 90+1' (pen.) | Stadium: Kuala Selangor Stadium; Attendance: 120; Referee: Amirul Izzat Rusli |

| 22 June 2024 | Immigration | 4–2 | Machan | Bangi |
| 16:45 UTC+8 | Hazim 33'; Thankgod Michael 35', 71'; Furqan Azri 42' | Report | Khairul Jemi 17'; Mohd Afiq Yunus 79' | Stadium: UKM Bangi Stadium; Attendance: 350; Referee: Mohamad Nawal Mohammad Zubir |

| 22 June 2024 | Bukit Tambun | 0–1 | Melaka | Batu Kawan |
| 20:45 UTC+8 | | Report | Royizzat Daud 25' | Stadium: Penang State Stadium; Attendance: 276; Referee: Kamal ikhwan bin yaacob |

| 23 June 2024 | Bunga Raya Damansara | 2–0 | Malaysian University | Kelana Jaya |
| 16:45 UTC+8 | Sunil Chandran 36'; Kogileswaran Raj 81' | Report | | Stadium: PKNS Football Field; Attendance: 280; Referee: Zulkarnain Bin Zakaria |

| 23 June 2024 | Kuala Lumpur Rovers | 1–1 | Manjung City | Cheras, Kuala Lumpur |
| 16:45 UTC+8 | Amer Saidin 53' (pen.) | Report | Shahrul Naim 78' | Stadium: Kuala Lumpur Stadium; Attendance: 120; Referee: Mohd Ridzuan Husni |

| 23 June 2024 | PIB Shah Alam | 1–1 | UiTM United | Nilai |
| 16:45 UTC+8 | Mohd Hafizan 51' | Report | Wan Irfan 71' | Stadium: USIM Stadium; Attendance: 50; Referee: Mohd Ridhwan Abd Rahman |

| 23 June 2024 | Gombak | 2–2 | Armed Forces | Selayang |
| 20:45 UTC+8 | Saiful Ridzuwan 66'; Patrik Yudi Gonsalves 69' | Report | Faiz Ibrahim 34', 44' | Stadium: Selayang Stadium; Attendance: 480; Referee: Muhammad Harris Sharuddin |

=== Matchweek 4 ===
| 26 June 2024 | Malaysian University | 4–2 | YP Maintenance | Bangi |
| 16:45 UTC+8 | Syahir 10'; Saiful Iskandar 22', 50'; Hausen 90+4' | Report | Azamuddin Akil 13'; Ariff Abdullah 37' | Stadium: UKM Bangi Stadium; Attendance: 80; Referee: S. Logeswaran |

| 29 June 2024 | PT Athletic | 2–1 | Machan | Cyberjaya |
| 16:45 UTC+8 | Amri 29'; Che Mohamad Arif 83' | Report | Azman Chuchu 64' | Stadium: MMU Stadium; Attendance: 229; Referee: Abdul Rahman Wahab |

| 29 June 2024 | PIB Shah Alam | 2–2 | Bukit Tambun | Nilai |
| 16:45 UTC+8 | Danial Ashraf 55'; Hafizan Ghazali 69' | Report | Syazwi Suhaimi 45+4'; Rafiuddin Roddin 81' | Stadium: USIM Stadium; Attendance: 30; Referee: Muhd Nasruddin bin Muhd Tamrin |

| 29 June 2024 | Manjung City | 0–2 | Melaka | Seri Manjung |
| 20:45 UTC+8 | | Report | Azim Rahim 9'; Fuseini Issah 36' | Stadium: Manjung Stadium; Attendance: 453; Referee: Amirul Izwan Yaacob |

| 30 June 2024 | Armed Forces | 1–0 | UiTM United | Kuala Lumpur |
| 16:45 UTC+8 | Hairul Iqmal 30' | Report | | Stadium: Mindef Stadium; Attendance: 100; Referee: Mohd Sufi Bin Lion@Rozan |

| 30 June 2024 | Bunga Raya Damansara | 1–1 | Immigration | Shah Alam |
| 16:45 UTC+8 | Farid 68' | Report | Hazim 48' | Stadium: UiTM Stadium; Attendance: 403; Referee: Jeevananthan M |

| 30 June 2024 | Kuala Lumpur Rovers | 6–0 | Harini | Cheras, Kuala Lumpur |
| 16:45 UTC+8 | Rafie 24', 58' (pen.), 72'; Amirul Husaini 28'; Amer Saidin 51' (pen.); Raffi Nagoorgani 87' | Report | | Stadium: Kuala Lumpur Stadium; Attendance: 80; Referee: Razlan Joffri Ali |

=== Matchweek 5 ===
| 13 July 2024 | Machan | 2–0 | Kuala Lumpur Rovers | Kuching |
| 16:15 UTC+8 | Ashri Chuchu 29'; Abdul Rahman 65' | Report | | Stadium: Sarawak State Stadium; Attendance: 500; Referee: Muhammad Afiq Naim |

| 13 July 2024 | Immigration | 3–1 | PT Athletic | Bangi |
| 16:45 UTC+8 | Hafiz Kamal 27'; Thankgod Michael 54', 69' | Report | Faris Shah Rosli 38' | Stadium: UKM Bangi Stadium; Attendance: 350; Referee: Ahmad Nawawi Amir |

| 13 July 2024 | YP Maintenance | 1–1 | Bunga Raya Damansara | Gambang |
| 16:45 UTC+8 | Muhammad Helmi Abdullah 60' | Report | Ignacio Sequeira 47' | Stadium: SSMP (UMPSA) Mini Stadium; Attendance: 112; Referee: Muhammad Almi Bin Abdullah |

| 13 July 2024 | Melaka | 3–1 | Harini | Krubong |
| 20:45 UTC+8 | Azim Rahim 3', 7', 53' | Report | Amierul Ismail 29' | Stadium: Hang Jebat Stadium; Attendance: 200; Referee: Firdaus Dahlan |

| 13 July 2024 | Manjung City | 0–2 | PIB Shah Alam | Seri Manjung |
| 20:45 UTC+8 | | Report | Danial Ashraf 2', 28' | Stadium: Manjung Stadium; Attendance: 438; Referee: Muhammad Amirul |

| 14 July 2024 | Gombak | 2–4 | Malaysian University | Selayang |
| 20:45 UTC+8 | Rusydan Wahid 51'; Patrik Majeski 80' | Report | Hadi Mohamad 17'; Zulkarnain Nasir 24'; Saiful Iskandar 36', 50' | Stadium: Selayang Stadium; Attendance: 379; Referee: Muhammad Harris Sharuddin |

| 24 July 2024 | Bukit Tambun | 3–0 | Armed Forces | Batu Kawan |
| 16:45 UTC+8 | Abdul Qayyum 65'; Youwarasan Maniom 67'; Husnul Irsal Amran 75' (pen.) | Report | | Stadium: Penang State Stadium; Attendance: 100; Referee: Kamal Ikhwan Yaacob |

=== Matchweek 6 ===
| 19 July 2024 | PIB Shah Alam | 1–0 | Gombak | Nilai |
| 16:45 UTC+8 | Danial Ashraf 90+2' | Report | | Stadium: USIM Stadium; Attendance: 100; Referee: Mohammad Hafizi Mohd Nor Hazalin |

| 20 July 2024 | Armed Forces | 1–1 | YP Maintenance | Kuala Lumpur |
| 16:45 UTC+8 | Max Fareezan 90+4' | Report | Arif Syazwan 45+2' | Stadium: Mindef Stadium; Attendance: 150; Referee: Abdul Rahman Wahab |

| 20 July 2024 | Harini | 0–0 | Machan | Kuala Selangor |
| 16:45 UTC+8 | | Report | | Stadium: Kuala Selangor Stadium; Attendance: 40; Referee: Jubik Bin Andangon |

| 20 July 2024 | Immigration | 1–0 | Malaysian University | Bangi |
| 16:45 UTC+8 | Nasriq 49' | Report | | Stadium: UKM Bangi Stadium; Attendance: 300; Referee: Muhammad Harris Sharuddin |

| 20 July 2024 | UiTM United | 0–3 | Melaka | Shah Alam |
| 20:45 UTC+8 | | Report | Azim Rahim 37'; Fuseini Issah 71'; Nasir Basharudin 77' | Stadium: UiTM Stadium; Attendance: 400; Referee: Fusser Sallih |

| 21 July 2024 | PT Athletic | 4–0 | Manjung City | Cyberjaya |
| 16:45 UTC+8 | Azeez Arisekola Adam 5'; Che M. Arif 42'; Syazwan Zainon 45+2'; Nurshamil 65' | Report | | Stadium: MMU Stadium; Attendance: 211; Referee: Ahmad Nawawi Amir |

| 21 July 2024 | Kuala Lumpur Rovers | 2–1 | Bukit Tambun | Cheras, Kuala Lumpur |
| 16:45 UTC+8 | Faiz Mazlan 45'; Amer Saidin 88' (pen.) | Report | Aizat Safuan 57' | Stadium: Kuala Lumpur Stadium; Attendance: 105; Referee: Mursyid Baharom |

=== Matchweek 7 ===
| 27 July 2024 | Machan | 0–2 | YP Maintenance | Kuching |
| 16:15 UTC+8 | | Report | Fahmie Haiqal 23', 25' | Stadium: Sarawak State Stadium; Attendance: 350; Referee: Mohd Zahid Bin Haizan |

| 27 July 2024 | PIB Shah Alam | 3–1 | Armed Forces | Nilai |
| 16:45 UTC+8 | Khairu Anwar 4'; Danial Ashraf 40'; Ferris Danial 81' | Report | Faiq Mat Alwi 90+1' | Stadium: USIM Stadium; Attendance: 100; Referee: Muhammad Nasruddin B Muhammad Tamrin |

| 27 July 2024 | Bunga Raya Damansara | 1–1 | PT Athletic | Kelana Jaya |
| 16:45 UTC+8 | Ignacio Sequeira 18' | Report | Fareez Amirul 81' | Stadium: Persada PLUS Mini Stadium; Attendance: 350; Referee: Mohd Atik Bin Kassim |

| 27 July 2024 | Bukit Tambun | 1–2 | Immigration | Batu Kawan |
| 20:45 UTC+8 | Abdul Qayyum 63' | Report | Hafiz Kamal 16'; Thankgod Michael 78' | Stadium: Penang State Stadium; Attendance: 100; Referee: Azizan Saat Ariffin |

| 27 July 2024 | Manjung City | 2–2 | UiTM United | Seri Manjung |
| 20:45 UTC+8 | Hasri Firzan 6'; C. Sasikumar 64' | Report | Fakhrur Razi 22'; Ahmad Haikal 27' | Stadium: Manjung Stadium; Attendance: 421; Referee: Mohd Hasrul bin A. Rahman |

| 28 July 2024 | Gombak | 2–0 | Harini | Selayang |
| 20:45 UTC+8 | Nazrul Kamaruzaman 85'; Isa Raman 89' (pen.) | Report | | Stadium: Selayang Stadium; Attendance: 289; Referee: Muhd Aizad Bin Damanhuri |

| 31 July 2024 | Malaysian University | 2–2 | Kuala Lumpur Rovers | Bangi |
| 16:45 UTC+8 | Hausen Shwahiri 50'; Hadi Mohamad 70' | Report | Rafie Yaacob 4'; Amirul Nizam Azmi 90+1' | Stadium: UKM Bangi Stadium; Attendance: 88; Referee: Jubik Andangon |

=== Matchweek 8 ===
| 2 August 2024 | PT Athletic | 1–0 | Melaka | Sepang |
| 20:45 UTC+8 | Nurshamil Abd Ghani 44' | Report | | Stadium: Sepang Municipal Council Mini Stadium; Attendance: 473; Referee: Mursyid Baharom |

| 3 August 2024 | Machan | 2–1 | PIB Shah Alam | Kuching |
| 16:15 UTC+8 | Azman Chuchu 50'; Mohd Afiq Yunus 78' | Report | Idris Ahmad 11' | Stadium: Sarawak State Stadium; Attendance: 250; Referee: Ensali Sabang Anak Timban |

| 3 August 2024 | YPM FC | 1–1 | Gombak | Gambang |
| 16:45 UTC+8 | Azamuddin Akil 75' (pen.) | Report | Isa Raman 51' | Stadium: SSMP (UMPSA) Mini Stadium; Attendance: 153; Referee: Ismail Saidi |

| 3 August 2024 | Harini | 1–2 | Armed Forces | Kuala Selangor |
| 16:45 UTC+8 | Praviin 80' | Report | Max Fareezan Lidin 35'; Shahrul Aznei 69' | Stadium: Kuala Selangor Stadium; Attendance: 52; Referee: Muhammad Afiq Bin Mohd Roslibe |

| 4 August 2024 | Kuala Lumpur Rovers | 0–0 | Immigration | Cheras |
| 16:45 UTC+8 | | Report | | Stadium: Kuala Lumpur Stadium; Attendance: 180; Referee: Radzi Asari |

| 4 August 2024 | UiTM United | 2–5 | Bunga Raya Damansara | Shah Alam |
| 20:45 UTC+8 | Ahmad Haikal 48'; Fakhrur Razi 51' | Report | Ignacio Sequeira 2', 25'; Kannan Kalaiselvan 9'; Irsyad Ahmad Radhuan (o.g.) 84'; M. Devekumaran 90+2' | Stadium: UiTM Stadium; Attendance: 257; Referee: Mohd Sufi Bin Lion@Rozan |

| 5 August 2024 | Malaysian University | 2–0 | Bukit Tambun | Bangi |
| 16:45 UTC+8 | Saiful Iskandar 6'; Hadi Mohamad 74' | Report | | Stadium: UKM Bangi Stadium; Attendance: 80; Referee: Atik Kassim |

=== Matchweek 9 ===
| 9 August 2024 | Manjung City | 5–2 | Harini | Seri Manjung |
| 20:45 UTC+8 | Sasikumar 26'; Muazzim 31'; Khairul Amizan 40'; Muhamad Sobri 63'; Saifuddin 84' | Report | Praviin 83', 90' | Stadium: Manjung Stadium; Attendance: 264; Referee: Muhammad Amirul Bin Mohd Yusuf Chow |

| 10 August 2024 | PT Athletic | 3–0 | UiTM United | Cyberjaya |
| 16:45 UTC+8 | Fandi Othman 42'; Che M. Arif 56'; Syazwan Zainon 88' | Report | | Stadium: MMU Stadium; Attendance: 209; Referee: Izzat Rusli |

| 10 August 2024 | Bukit Tambun | 2–0 | Machan | Batu Kawan |
| 20:45 UTC+8 | B. Sanjef Dinesh 25'; Sadam Hashim 90+3' | Report | | Stadium: Penang State Stadium; Attendance: 80; Referee: Kamal Ikhwan Bin Yaacob |

| 10 August 2024 | Melaka | 3–0 | YPM FC | Krubong |
| 20:45 UTC+8 | Azim Rahim 16', 25', 69' (pen.) | Report | | Stadium: Hang Jebat Stadium; Attendance: 300; Referee: Usaid Jamal |

| 11 August 2024 | Armed Forces | 0–3 | Malaysian University | Kuala Lumpur |
| 16:45 UTC+8 | | Report | Wan Muhammad Aqil Hakimi 32', 80'; Zulkarnain Nasir 42' | Stadium: Mindef Stadium; Attendance: 137; Referee: Radzi Asari |

| 11 August 2024 | Bunga Raya Damansara | 1–2 | PIB Shah Alam | Shah Alam |
| 20:45 UTC+8 | Ignacio Sequeira 30' | Report | Amir Hafiz 11'; Mustakim Mustafa 32' | Stadium: UiTM Stadium; Attendance: 250; Referee: Fakhri Ismail |

| 18 September 2024 | Gombak | 0–1 | Kuala Lumpur Rovers | Selayang |
| 16:45 UTC+8 | | Report | Rafie Yaacob 36' | Stadium: Selayang Stadium; Attendance: 147; Referee: Jubik Andangon |

=== Matchweek 10 ===
| 16 August 2024 | Melaka | 2–0 | Malaysian University | Krubong |
| 20:45 UTC+8 | Mohd Zulkifli 37' (pen.); Royizzat Daud 90+9' | Report | | Stadium: Hang Jebat Stadium; Attendance: 250; Referee: Fitri Maskon |

| 17 August 2024 | YPM FC | 1–4 | PT Athletic | Gambang |
| 16:45 UTC+8 | Nur Aliff Farhan 33' | Report | Nurshamil 43', 90+2'; Indra Putra 85'; Latiff Suhaimi 90+1' | Stadium: SSMP (UMPSA) Mini Stadium; Attendance: 212; Referee: Muhammad Almi Bin Abdullah (Abon) |

| 17 August 2024 | Immigration | 1–1 | Armed Forces | Bangi |
| 16:45 UTC+8 | Furqan Azri 69' | Report | Rafizol Roslan 26' | Stadium: UKM Bangi Stadium; Attendance: 2,590; Referee: Mursyid Baharom |

| 17 August 2024 | Harini | 1–0 | UiTM United | Kuala Selangor |
| 16:45 UTC+8 | Rafiq Shah Zaim 54' (pen.) | Report | | Stadium: Kuala Selangor Stadium; Attendance: 60; Referee: Fakhri Ismail |

| 17 August 2024 | Bukit Tambun | 4–1 | Manjung City | Batu Kawan |
| 20:45 UTC+8 | Aizat Safuan 5'; Mohd Afif Azman 21'; Marcus Mah 29'; B. Sanjef Dinesh 34' | Report | Saifuddin 60' | Stadium: Penang State Stadium; Attendance: 80; Referee: Muhammad Saiful Amry Bin Jamaluddin |

| 18 August 2024 | Kuala Lumpur Rovers | 3–0 | Bunga Raya Damansara | Cheras |
| 16:45 UTC+8 | Faris Zabri 2', 68'; Amirul Husaini 2' | Report | | Stadium: Kuala Lumpur Stadium; Attendance: 115; Referee: Jubik Bin Andangon |

| 18 August 2024 | Gombak | 2–1 | Machan | Selayang |
| 20:45 UTC+8 | Isa Raman 24' (pen.); Alif Safwan 67' | Report | Azman Chuchu 50' | Stadium: Selayang Stadium; Attendance: 132; Referee: Atik Kassim |

=== Matchweek 11 ===
| 23 August 2024 | Armed Forces | 1–1 | Machan | Kuala Lumpur |
| 16:45 UTC+8 | Max Fareezan 71' | Report | Azman Chuchu 43' | Stadium: Mindef Stadium; Attendance: 135; Referee: Abdul Rahman Wahab |

| 23 August 2024 | UiTM United | 2–0 | YPM FC | Shah Alam |
| 20:45 UTC+8 | Zikry Hafis 33'; Aman Syamim 45+2' | Report | | Stadium: UiTM Stadium; Attendance: 200; Referee: Zulkarnian Zakaria |

| 24 August 2024 | Bunga Raya Damansara | 3–0 | Bukit Tambun | Shah Alam |
| 16:45 UTC+8 | Tamilmaran Manimaran 33'; Kogileswaran Raj 45+4' (pen.); Ignacio Sequeira 55' | Report | | Stadium: UiTM Stadium; Attendance: 143; Referee: Mursyid Baharom |

| 24 August 2024 | Malaysian University | 2–2 | Manjung City | Bangi |
| 16:45 UTC+8 | Vickie Owen Marinus 65'; Zharif Nazhan 75' | Report | Hasri Firzan 30'; Shahrul Naim Hisham 67' | Stadium: UKM Bangi Stadium; Attendance: 83; Referee: Jubik Bin Andangon |

| 24 August 2024 | PIB Shah Alam | 0–2 | PT Athletic | Nilai |
| 16:45 UTC+8 | | Report | Nurshamil Abd Ghani 56'; Adam Azeez Arisekola 86' | Stadium: USIM Stadium; Attendance: 100; Referee: Muhammad Nasruddin B Muhammad Tamrin |

| 24 August 2024 | Gombak | 1–1 | Immigration | Selayang |
| 16:45 UTC+8 | Firdaus Azizul 2' | Report | Hafiz Kamal 52' | Stadium: Selayang Stadium; Attendance: 102; Referee: Anselm Anak Enterang |

| 29 August 2024 | Kuala Lumpur Rovers | 1–1 | Melaka | Cheras |
| 16:45 UTC+8 | Amirul Husaini 3' | Report | Nizarruddin Jazi 83' | Stadium: Kuala Lumpur Stadium; Attendance: 130; Referee: Muhammad Ridhwan Bin Abdul Rahman |

=== Matchweek 12 ===
| 1 September 2024 | PT Athletic | 1–0 | Malaysian University | Cyberjaya |
| 16:45 UTC+8 | Hafiz Ramdan 20' | Report | | Stadium: MMU Stadium; Attendance: 244; Referee: Razlan Joffri Ali |

| 7 September 2024 | Machan | 1–2 | Bunga Raya Damansara | Sibu |
| 16:15 UTC+8 | Mohd Aidil Safee 77' | Report | K. Kannan 48'; Farid Khazali 69' | Stadium: Azman Hashim Stadium; Attendance: 200; Referee: Abang Azharuddin Abdullah |

| 7 September 2024 | Harini | 0–7 | YPM FC | Kuala Selangor |
| 16:45 UTC+8 | | Report | Adam Daniel 4', 35'; Nur Aliff Farhan 44', 77', 82'; Azamuddin Akil 58'; Haziq Izzuddin 67' | Stadium: Kuala Selangor Stadium; Attendance: 45; Referee: Ridzuan Husni |

| 7 September 2024 | Melaka | 5–1 | Armed Forces | Krubong |
| 20:45 UTC+8 | Fikri Mohamad Shah 2'; Azim Rahim 25' (pen.); Fuseini Issah 45+2'; Nizarruddin Jazi 62'; Durrkeswaran Ganasan 64' | Report | Afiq Fikri Rahmat 50' | Stadium: Hang Jebat Stadium; Attendance: 300; Referee: Mohamad Haziq Iqmal Bin Ayazi |

| 8 September 2024 | Immigration | 1–1 | PIB Shah Alam | Bangi |
| 16:45 UTC+8 | Hazim Abu Zaid 69' | Report | Azriddin Rosli 90+4' | Stadium: UKM Bangi Stadium; Attendance: 200; Referee: Muhammad Ridhwan Bin Abdul Rahman |

| 8 September 2024 | Manjung City | 1–2 | Gombak | Seri Manjung |
| 20:45 UTC+8 | Noor Aiman 45' | Report | Patrik Majeski 32'; Isa Raman 90' (pen.) | Stadium: Manjung Stadium; Attendance: 76; Referee: Mohd Hasrul bin A. Rahman |

| 25 September 2024 | Bukit Tambun | 4–1 | UiTM United | Batu Kawan |
| 16:45 UTC+8 | Nurfais Johari 2', 73'; Husnul Irsal Amran 30'; Afif Azman 49' | Report | Haziq Deli 42' | Stadium: Penang State Stadium; Attendance: 30; Referee: Nur Amali Ihsanuddin |

=== Matchweek 13 ===
| 13 September 2024 | Armed Forces | 0–3 | PT Athletic | Kuala Lumpur |
| 16:45 UTC+8 | | Report | Azarul Nazarith 39'; Amri Yahyah 53', 55' | Stadium: Mindef Stadium; Attendance: 200; Referee: Abdul Rahman Wahab |

| 13 September 2024 | Bunga Raya Damansara | 2–0 | Manjung City | Shah Alam |
| 20:45 UTC+8 | Kogileswaran Raj 3'; K.Kannan 64' | Report | | Stadium: UiTM Stadium; Attendance: 213; Referee: Dinesh A/L Balan |

| 14 September 2024 | YPM FC | 1–2 | Bukit Tambun | Gambang |
| 16:45 UTC+8 | Badrul Amin Jasmi 87' | Report | Nurfais Johari 76', 90' | Stadium: SSMP (UMPSA) Mini Stadium; Attendance: 23; Referee: Ahmad Saifuldin Abu Bakar |

| 14 September 2024 | PIB Shah Alam | 0–0 | Kuala Lumpur Rovers | Nilai |
| 16:45 UTC+8 | | Report | | Stadium: USIM Stadium; Attendance: 80; Referee: Muhammad Faizal Talib |

| 15 September 2024 | Immigration | 1–1 | Melaka | Bangi |
| 16:45 UTC+8 | Thankgod Michael 67' | | Haziq Puad 90+2' | Stadium: UKM Bangi Stadium |

| 5 October 2024 | Harini | 0–6 | Malaysian University | Kuala Selangor |
| 16:45 UTC+8 | | Report | Muhammad Nazrul Afiq 5'; Zharif Nazhan 7'; Alief Najmi 45'; Muhammad Izzul Azmi 48', 66'; Iman Hakimi Aznan 60' | Stadium: Kuala Selangor Main Stadium; Attendance: 45; Referee: Arif Ismail |

| 5 October 2024 | Gombak | 5–0 | UiTM United | Selayang |
| 20:45 UTC+8 | Vinícius Amaral 23'; Firdaus Azizul 65'; Emanuel 83'; Khairi Suffian 90+5'; Arif Imran 65' (o.g.) | Report | | Stadium: Selayang Stadium; Attendance: 175; Referee: Zulkarnian Zakaria |

=== Matchweek 14 ===
| 20 September 2024 | Manjung City | 1–1 | Immigration | Seri Manjung |
| 20:45 UTC+8 | Muazzim Abd Khalil 82' | Report | Thankgod Michael 90' (pen.) | Stadium: Manjung Stadium; Attendance: 293; Referee: Muhamad Shamil Mohd Jaafar |

| 21 September 2024 | Malaysian University | 2–4 | PIB Shah Alam | Bangi |
| 16:45 UTC+8 | Zulkarnain Nasir 64', 77' (pen.) | Report | Nik Azli 23'; Idris Ahmad 32'; Asyraaf Aqmar 53'; Ridhwan Nazri 83' | Stadium: UKM Bangi Stadium; Attendance: 85; Referee: Zulkarnian Zakaria |

| 21 September 2024 | Bukit Tambun | 7–1 | Harini | Batu Kawan |
| 20:45 UTC+8 | Aizat Safuan 15'; Marcus Mah 17', 90+5'; Syafiq Heelmi 25'; Sadam Hashim 45+1'; Afif Azman 76'; Nurfais Johari 86' | Report | Nur Areff Kamaruddin 32' | Stadium: Penang State Stadium; Attendance: 50; Referee: Kamal Ikhwan Bin Yaacob |

| 21 September 2024 | Melaka | 1–0 | Bunga Raya Damansara | Krubong |
| 20:45 UTC+8 | Durrkeswaran Ganasan 44' | Report | | Stadium: Hang Jebat Stadium; Attendance: 200; Referee: Zamzaidi Katimin |

| 22 September 2024 | Kuala Lumpur Rovers | 1–0 | YPM FC | Cheras, Kuala Lumpur |
| 16:45 UTC+8 | Sharul Amin 11' | Report | | Stadium: Kuala Lumpur Stadium; Attendance: 90; Referee: Mohd Sufi Bin Lion@Rozan |

| 22 September 2024 | Gombak | 1–0 | PT Athletic | Selayang |
| 16:45 UTC+8 | Nazrul Kamaruzaman 84' | Report | | Stadium: Selayang Stadium; Attendance: 146; Referee: Jubik Andangon |

| 9 October 2024 | UiTM United | 2–0 | Machan | Shah Alam |
| 20:45 UTC+8 | Wan Syamil Sulaiman 68'; Haziq Deli 71' | Report | | Stadium: UiTM Stadium; Attendance: 150; Referee: Mohd Hafiz Zharif bin Ahmad Jafri |

=== Matchweek 15 ===
| 27 September 2024 | Bunga Raya Damansara | 2–0 | Gombak | Shah Alam |
| 20:45 UTC+8 | Farid Khazali 47'; Alifh Aiman 79' | Report | | Stadium: UiTM Stadium; Attendance: 217; Referee: Ahmad Nawawi Amir |

| 28 September 2024 | PT Athletic | 2–3 | Kuala Lumpur Rovers | Cyberjaya |
| 16:45 UTC+8 | Amri Yahyah 22'; Dirga Surdi 83' | Report | Faizal Hafiq 12'; Faiz Mazlan 14'; Izreen Izwandy 66' | Stadium: MMU Stadium; Attendance: 229; Referee: Zulkarnian Zakaria |

| 28 September 2024 | YPM FC | 0–3 | Immigration | Gambang |
| 16:45 UTC+8 | | Report | Furqan Azri 24'; Alif Romli 55'; T Mohd Norzaiful 77' | Stadium: SSMP (UMPSA) Mini Stadium; Attendance: 107; Referee: Ahmad Saifuldin Abu Bakar |

| 28 September 2024 | Manjung City | 0–1 | Armed Forces | Seri Manjung |
| 20:45 UTC+8 | | Report | Akmal Md Isa 75' | Stadium: Manjung Stadium; Attendance: 163; Referee: Sayed Ahmad Al-Quraisy |

| 29 September 2024 | Harini | 2–5 | PIB Shah Alam | Kuala Selangor |
| 16:45 UTC+8 | G. Thipen Raj 54' (pen.); Rafiq Shah Zaim 63' | Report | Amirul Azzim 32'; Khairu Anwar 40'; Danial Ashraf 77' (pen.) 84'; Muhammad Faudzi 88' | Stadium: Kuala Selangor Main Stadium; Attendance: 85; Referee: Mursyid Baharom |

| 29 September 2024 | Malaysian University | 2–0 | UiTM United | Bangi |
| 16:15 UTC+8 | Syahir Abdul Rahman 37'; Nazhan Refli 66' (pen.) | Report | | Stadium: UKM Bangi Stadium; Attendance: 105; Referee: Mohd Sufi Bin Lion@Rozan |

| 5 October 2024 | Machan | 0–4 | Melaka | Sibu |
| 16:15 UTC+8 | | Report | Zulkiffli Zakaria 14', 43'; Fuseini Issah 33'; Nizarruddin Jazi 68' | Stadium: Azman Hashim Stadium; Attendance: 150; Referee: Mohd Zahid Bin Haizan |

Round 2

=== Matchweek 16 ===
| 12 October 2024 | Immigration | 3–1 | UiTM United | Bangi |
| 16:45 UTC+8 | Thankgod Michael 69'; Furqan Azri 75'; Nuh Azlan 88' (o.g.) | Report | Arif Imran 73' | Stadium: UKM Bangi Stadium; Attendance: 300; Referee: Anselm Anak Enterang |

| 12 October 2024 | YPM FC | 0–1 | Manjung City | Gambang |
| 16:45 UTC+8 | | Report | Kayden Soper 32' | Stadium: SSMP (UMPSA) Mini Stadium; Attendance: 37; Referee: Muhammad Azrul Mahmood |

| 12 October 2024 | Bukit Tambun | 0–0 | Gombak | Batu Kawan |
| 16:45 UTC+8 | | Report | | Stadium: Penang State Stadium; Attendance: 50; Referee: Ammar Rosdi |

| 13 October 2024 | Harini | 0–2 | Bunga Raya Damansara | Kuala Selangor |
| 16:45 UTC+8 | | Report | Taha M Khalid 87', 90+4' | Stadium: Kuala Selangor Main Stadium; Attendance: 120; Referee: Amirol Bin Rosdi |

| 13 October 2024 | Machan | 0–6 | Malaysian University | Kuala Lumpur |
| 16:45 UTC+8 | | Report | Muhammad Nazrul Afiq 8', 25'; Iman Hakimi Aznan 18'; Zharif Nazhan 41'; Saiful Iskandar 48'; Wan Muhammad Aqil Hakimi 57' | Stadium: UM Arena Stadium; Attendance: 100; Referee: Mohammad Faizal Talib |

| 13 October 2024 | Armed Forces | 0–2 | Kuala Lumpur Rovers | Kuala Lumpur |
| 16:45 UTC+8 | | Report | Sharul Amin 36'; Amer Saidin 79' (pen.) | Stadium: Mindef Stadium; Attendance: 203; Referee: Zulkarnian Zakaria |

| 13 October 2024 | Melaka | 3–0 | PIB Shah Alam | Krubong |
| 20:45 UTC+8 | Fuseini Issah 22', 40'; Royizzat Daud 80' | Report | | Stadium: Hang Jebat Stadium; Attendance: 245; Referee: Muhammad Usaid Bin Jamal |

=== Matchweek 17 ===
| 18 October 2024 | Manjung City | 4–0 | Machan | Seri Manjung |
| 20:45 UTC+8 | Syamin Baharuddin 38' (pen.) 44', 45'; N. Thinesvarman 48' | Report | | Stadium: Manjung Stadium; Attendance: 347; Referee: Muhammad Firdaus Bin Ibrahim |

| 18 October 2024 | Bunga Raya Damansara | 3–1 | Armed Forces | Shah Alam |
| 20:45 UTC+8 | Alifh Aiman 31'; Farid Khazali 37'; Fazli Ghazali 64' | Report | Max Fareezan 82' | Stadium: UiTM Stadium; Attendance: 253; Referee: Abdul Rahman Wahab |

| 19 October 2024 | Immigration | 2–1 | Harini | Bangi |
| 16:45 UTC+8 | Hafiz Kamal 42', 45+4' | Report | S. Chanthuru 55' | Stadium: UKM Bangi Stadium; Attendance: 300; Referee: Ahmad Nawawi Amir |

| 19 October 2024 | PIB Shah Alam | 0–1 | YPM FC | Nilai |
| 16:45 UTC+8 | | Report | Muhammad Helmi Abdullah 8' | Stadium: USIM Stadium; Attendance: 60; Referee: Latiffi Zahrom |

| 20 October 2024 | Kuala Lumpur Rovers | 1–0 | UiTM United | Cheras, Kuala Lumpur |
| 16:45 UTC+8 | Amirul Husaini 45+1' | Report | | Stadium: Kuala Lumpur Stadium; Attendance: 120; Referee: Jubik Andangon |

| 20 October 2024 | Gombak | 0–0 | Melaka | Selayang |
| 20:45 UTC+8 | | Report | | Stadium: Selayang Stadium; Attendance: 153; Referee: Muhammad Harris Sharuddin |

| 22 October 2024 | Bukit Tambun | 1–3 | PT Athletic | Batu Kawan |
| 16:45 UTC+8 | Rafiuddin Roddin 69' | Report | Amri Yahyah 29'; Adam Azeez 55'; Che M. Arif 83' | Stadium: Penang State Stadium; Attendance: 50; Referee: Kamal Ikhwan Yaacob |

=== Matchweek 18 ===
| 25 October 2024 | Machan | 1–6 | Immigration | Selayang |
| 16:45 UTC+8 | Nicholson Nicky 78' | Report | N. Javabilaarivin 30', 45+2', 57'; Thankgod Michael 42', 88'; Furqan Azri 78' | Stadium: Selayang Stadium; Attendance: 100 |

| 25 October 2024 | UiTM United | 2–0 | PIB Shah Alam | Shah Alam |
| 20:45 UTC+8 | Arif Imran 4'; Aman Syamim 76' | Report | | Stadium: UiTM Stadium; Attendance: 200; Referee: Muhamad Arif Bin Ismail |

| 26 October 2024 | Malaysian University | 0–1 | Bunga Raya Damansara | Bangi |
| 16:45 UTC+8 | | Report | Alifh Aiman Rosman 10' | Stadium: UKM Bangi Stadium; Attendance: 50; Referee: Noor Farhan Hanis Bin Dahalin |

| 26 October 2024 | Armed Forces | 1–0 | Gombak | Kuala Lumpur |
| 16:45 UTC+8 | Ogolo Wisdom 45+1' (pen.) | Report | | Stadium: Mindef Stadium; Attendance: 80; Referee: Mohd Sufi Rozan |

| 26 October 2024 | Melaka | 4–0 | Bukit Tambun | Krubong |
| 20:45 UTC+8 | Fuseini Issah 8'; D. Ganesan 16' (pen.); Nizarruddin Jazi 52'; Khairul Anwar Shahrudin 84' | Report | | Stadium: Hang Jebat Stadium; Attendance: 230; Referee: Mohamad Haziq Iqmal Bin Ayazi |

| 29 October 2024 | PT Athletic | 4–1 | Harini | Cyberjaya |
| 16:45 UTC+8 | Adam Azeez 34', 67', 69', 74' | Report | Rifqi Mukhtar 41' | Stadium: MMU Stadium; Attendance: 78; Referee: Amirul Izzat Bin Rusli |

| 15 December 2024 | Manjung City | 0–1 | Kuala Lumpur Rovers | Seri Manjung |
| 20:45 UTC+8 | | Report | Raffi Nagoorgani 50' | Stadium: Manjung Stadium; Attendance: 110; Referee: Sayed Ahmad Al-Quraisy |

=== Matchweek 19 ===
| 8 November 2024 | Machan | 3–6 | PT Athletic | Cyberjaya |
| 16:45 UTC+8 | Azafrul Farish 27'; Cassey Lipa 33' (pen.); Aaron Jeremiah 85' | Report | Fandi Othman 41'; Latiff Suhaimi 54' (pen.); Mohd Amri Yahyah; Syazwan Zainon 62'; Nurshamil Abd Ghani 83' | Stadium: MMU Stadium; Attendance: 71; Referee: Mohd Hafiz Zharif Bin Ahmad Jafri |

| 8 November 2024 | UiTM United | 1–2 | Armed Forces | Shah Alam |
| 20:45 UTC+8 | Ahmad Haikal 58' | Report | M. Devekumaran 28'; Daniel Syazrul 74' | Stadium: UiTM Stadium; Attendance: 102; Referee: Muhammad Harris Sharuddin |

| 9 November 2024 | Harini | 1–2 | Kuala Lumpur Rovers | Kuala Selangor |
| 16:45 UTC+8 | Afiq Haikal 67' | Report | Rafie Yaacob 78', 90+2' | Stadium: Kuala Selangor Main Stadium; Attendance: 55; Referee: Fusser Sallih |

| 9 November 2024 | YPM FC | 1–2 | Malaysian University | Gambang |
| 16:45 UTC+8 | Nur Aliff Farhan 56' (pen.) | Report | Zharif Nazhan 45+1'; Wan Aqil Hakimi 68' | Stadium: SSMP (UMPSA) Mini Stadium; Attendance: 77; Referee: Amirul Zamil Bin Abd Jamil |

| 9 November 2024 | Bukit Tambun | 3–1 | PIB Shah Alam | Batu Kawan |
| 16:45 UTC+8 | Husnul Irsal Amran 52'; Lokman Hakim Abdullah 81', 84' | Report | Nik Azli 31' | Stadium: Penang State Stadium; Attendance: 50; Referee: Khairul Fadzri Naim Bin Yusri |

| 10 November 2024 | Immigration | 1–0 | Bunga Raya Damansara | Bangi |
| 16:45 UTC+8 | Faisal Rosli 48' | Report | | Stadium: UKM Bangi Stadium; Attendance: 350; Referee: Ahmad Nawawi Amir |

| 12 November 2024 | Melaka | 7–0 | Manjung City | Krubong |
| 20:45 UTC+8 | D. Ganesan 21'; Michael Ozor 49'; Fuseini Issah 56'; Fahmi Faizal 58'; Hadi Mohamad 70'; Fikri 76'; Azim Rahim 82' | Report | | Stadium: Hang Jebat Stadium; Attendance: 224; Referee: Fitri Maskon |

=== Matchweek 20 ===
| 15 November 2024 | PT Athletic | 1–2 | Immigration | Cyberjaya |
| 16:45 UTC+8 | Indra Putra 31' | Report | T Mohd Norzaiful 11'; Thankgod Michael 28' | Stadium: MMU Stadium; Attendance: 107; Referee: Jubik Andangon |

| 15 November 2024 | Bunga Raya Damansara | 1–1 | YPM FC | Shah Alam |
| 20:45 UTC+8 | Kogileswaran Raj 59' | Report | Badrul Amin Jesmi 61' | Stadium: UiTM Stadium; Attendance: 200; Referee: Muhamad Arif Bin Ismail |

| 16 November 2024 | Armed Forces | 3–0 | Bukit Tambun | Kuala Lumpur |
| 16:45 UTC+8 | Rafizol Roslan 22'; Williams Wisdom Ogolo 28', 40' | Report | | Stadium: Mindef Stadium; Attendance: 102; Referee: Jeevanathan M. Ponniamoorthy |

| 16 November 2024 | PIB Shah Alam | 0–4 | Manjung City | Nilai |
| 16:45 UTC+8 | | Report | Seok Ui-Jun 1', 10'; Asyraaf Pushni 88' (pen.); Tasnim Fitri 6' (o.g.) | Stadium: USIM Stadium; Attendance: 50; Referee: Izzul Fikri Kamaruzaman |

| 17 November 2024 | Kuala Lumpur Rovers | 10–1 | Machan | Cheras, Kuala Lumpur |
| 16:45 UTC+8 | Amirul Husaini 6', 68', 70'; Amer Saidin 21', 56', 63'; Sharul Amin 58', 76', 82'; Gopi Rizqi 84' | Report | Nickson Dicky Pili 43' (pen.) | Stadium: Kuala Lumpur Stadium; Attendance: 50; Referee: Muhammad Faizal Talib |

| 17 November 2024 | Malaysian University | 1–1 | Gombak | Bangi |
| 16:45 UTC+8 | Zulkarnain Nasir 42' | Report | Alif Safwan 52' | Stadium: UKM Bangi Stadium; Attendance: 80; Referee: S. Logeswaran |

| 17 November 2024 | Harini | 0–7 | Melaka | Krubong |
| 20:45 UTC+8 | | Report | Fuseini Issah 1', 2'; Hadi Mohamad 8'; Fikri Mohamed 41'; Azim Rahim 44', 47'; Michael Ozor 66' | Stadium: Hang Jebat Stadium; Attendance: 220; Referee: Firdaus Dahlan |

=== Matchweek 21 ===
| 29 November 2024 | Machan | 4–3 | Harini | Cyberjaya |
| 16:15 UTC+8 | Aaron Jeremiah 33'; Danish Irfan 36'; Nickson Dicky 86' (pen.); Ahmad Musawwir 87' | Report | Nurhakimin 21'; G. Thipen Raj 64'; Nur Areff Kamaruddin 80' | Stadium: MMU Stadium; Attendance: 70; Referee: Amirul Izzat Rusli |

| 30 November 2024 | YPM FC | 2–2 | Armed Forces | Gambang |
| 16:45 UTC+8 | Hilmi Husaini Asmadi 56'; Amir Eimran 59' | Report | Ogolo Williams Wisdom 3'; Faiz Ibrahim 6' | Stadium: SSMP (UMPSA) Mini Stadium; Attendance: 42; Referee: Saifuddin Abu Bakar |

| 30 November 2024 | Gombak | 3–0 | PIB Shah Alam | Kuala Lumpur |
| 20:45 UTC+8 | Dzulfahmi Abdul Hadi 53', 65'; Isa Raman 75' | Report | | Stadium: MINDEF Stadium; Attendance: 80; Referee: Zulkarnian Zakaria |

| 1 December 2024 | Malaysian University | 1–2 | Immigration | Cyberjaya |
| 16:45 UTC+8 | Vickie Owen Marinus 21' | Report | Hafiz Kamal 8'; Norzaiful Zaizurin 69' | Stadium: MMU Stadium; Attendance: 120; Referee: Jubik Andangon |

| 3 December 2024 | Bukit Tambun | 1–1 | Kuala Lumpur Rovers | Batu Kawan |
| 16:45 UTC+8 | Afif Azman 51' | Report | Nazirul Hasif 37' | Stadium: Penang State Stadium; Attendance: 50; Referee: Kamal Yaacob |

| 3 December 2024 | Manjung City | 1–1 | PT Athletic | Seri Manjung |
| 20:45 UTC+8 | Kayden Soper 4' | Report | Nurshamil 44' | Stadium: Manjung Stadium; Attendance: 127; Referee: Muhamad Shamil Mohd Jaafar |

| 3 December 2024 | Melaka | 4–0 | UiTM United | Krubong |
| 20:45 UTC+8 | Ikhwan Hakim 5' (o.g.); Fuseini Issah 9', 17'; Azim Rahim 57' (pen.) | Report | | Stadium: Hang Jebat Stadium; Attendance: 216; Referee: Firdaus Dahlan |

=== Matchweek 22 ===
| 6 December 2024 | Immigration | 4–0 | Bukit Tambun | Bangi |
| 16:45 UTC+8 | Thankgod Michael 10', 45'; Alif Romli 83'; Hazrin Jamil 84' | Report | | Stadium: UKM Bangi Stadium; Attendance: 300; Referee: Zam Azwan Khan |

| 7 December 2024 | Armed Forces | 8–0 | PIB Shah Alam | Kuala Lumpur |
| 16:45 UTC+8 | Rafizol Roslan 7'; Shahrul Aznei 9'; Ogolo 11', 22', 55' (pen.); Max Fareezan 62'; M. Devekumaran 72'; Hairul Iqmal 90+1' | Report | | Stadium: Mindef Stadium; Attendance: 80; Referee: Muhammad Harris Sharuddin |

| 7 December 2024 | YPM FC | 3–0 | Machan | Gambang |
| 16:45 UTC+8 | Amir Eimran 13'; Hilmi Husaini Asmadi 15'; Azamuddin Akil 52' | Report | | Stadium: SSMP (UMPSA) Mini Stadium; Attendance: 50; Referee: Muhammad Azrul Mahmood |

| 8 December 2024 | Kuala Lumpur Rovers | 0–0 | Malaysian University | Cheras, Kuala Lumpur |
| 16:45 UTC+8 | | Report | | Stadium: Kuala Lumpur Stadium; Attendance: 60; Referee: Muhammad Faizal Talib |

| 8 December 2024 | UiTM United | 0–2 | Manjung City | Shah Alam |
| 20:45 UTC+8 | | Report | Syamin Baharuddin 45+1' (pen.); Aiman Zaidi 90' | Stadium: UiTM Stadium; Attendance: 200; Referee: Anselm Anak Enterang |

| 10 December 2024 | Harini | 2–6 | Gombak | Nilai |
| 16:45 UTC+8 | G. Thipen Raj 53', 56' (pen.) | Report | Alif Safwan 11'; Danial 50'; Emanuel 72', 90+2'; Isa Raman 77'; Khairil Anuar 78' | Stadium: USIM Stadium; Attendance: 70; Referee: Jeevanathan M. Ponniamoorthy |

| 13 December 2024 | PT Athletic | 1–2 | Bunga Raya Damansara | Cyberjaya |
| 16:45 UTC+8 | Dirga Surdi 46' | Report | N. Insaurralde 36'; Taha M Khalid 71' | Stadium: MMU Stadium; Attendance: 115; Referee: Jubik Andangon |

=== Matchweek 23 ===
| 20 December 2024 | Bunga Raya Damansara | 2–0 | UiTM United | Shah Alam |
| 16:45 UTC+8 | N. Insaurralde 53'; Kogileswaran Raj 67' | Report | | Stadium: UiTM Stadium; Attendance: 200; Referee: Ahmad Zuhadi Dzulkifli |

| 20 December 2024 | PIB Shah Alam | 0–5 | Machan | Nilai |
| 16:45 UTC+8 | | Report | Azafrul Farish Azman 30', 39', 54'; Cassey Lipa 36' (pen.); Nickson Dicky (42.) | Stadium: USIM Stadium; Attendance: 10; Referee: Helbe Bin Mositing |

| 20 December 2024 | Armed Forces | 4–0 | Harini | Kuala Lumpur |
| 16:45 UTC+8 | Ogolo Williams 33', 69'; Dzulfadhlie Shamsuri 66'; Max Fareezan 89' | Report | | Stadium: Mindef Stadium; Attendance: 85; Referee: Radzi Asari |

| 21 December 2024 | Bukit Tambun | 0–5 | Malaysian University | Batu Kawan |
| 16:45 UTC+8 | | Report | Zulkarnain Nasir 10'; Iman Hakimi 52'; Syahir Abdul Rahman 69'; Wan Aqil Hakimi 70'; Arif Danial 76' | Stadium: Penang State Stadium; Attendance: 40; Referee: Kamal Yaacob |

| 21 December 2024 | Gombak | 2–4 | YPM FC | Selayang |
| 16:45 UTC+8 | Saiful Hasnol Raffi 45'; Danial Hadri Effendi 87' | Report | Badrul Amin Jesmi 61'; Syawal Norsam 68'; Amir Eimran 74'; Azamuddin Akil 83' | Stadium: Selayang Stadium; Attendance: 100; Referee: Mohd Johafahmi Bin Taib |

| 26 December 2024 | Immigration | 2–0 | Kuala Lumpur Rovers | Bangi |
| 16:45 UTC+8 | T Mohd Norzaiful 71'; Felipe Lima 76' | Report | | Stadium: UKM Bangi Stadium; Attendance: 200; Referee: Ahmad Nawawi Amir |

| 4 January 2025 | Melaka | 3–2 | PT Athletic | Krubong |
| 20:45 UTC+8 | Hadi Mohamad 3'; Azim Rahim 10'; Nizarruddin 50' | Report | Nurshamil 14'; Amri Yahyah 54' | Stadium: Hang Jebat Stadium; Attendance: 360; Referee: Izwan Abdullah |

=== Matchweek 24 ===
| 13 December 2024 | Machan | 1–3 | Bukit Tambun | Kuala Lumpur |
| 16:45 UTC+8 | Nickson Dicky Pili 89' | Report | Husnul Irsal Amran 10'; Rafiuddin Roddin 35'; Aizat Safuan 60' | Stadium: UM Arena Stadium; Attendance: 50; Referee: Mohd Hafizuan Bin Mohd Khair |

| 15 December 2024 | Malaysian University | 0–0 | Armed Forces | Kuala Lumpur |
| 16:45 UTC+8 | | Report | | Stadium: UM Arena Stadium; Attendance: 80; Referee: Muhammad Harris Sharuddin |

| 27 December 2024 | YPM FC | 1–2 | Melaka | Gambang |
| 16:45 UTC+8 | Azamuddin Akil 45+1' | Report | Azim Rahim 15'; D. Ganesan 17' | Stadium: SSMP (UMPSA) Mini Stadium; Attendance: 77; Referee: Ismail Saidi |

| 28 December 2024 | Harini | 0–7 | Manjung City | Cyberjaya |
| 16:45 UTC+8 | | Report | Aiman Zaidi 14'; Syamil Mazlan 22'; Saifuddin Khairil Anuar 38', 53'; Sobri Mohamed Hasri 54'; Kayden Soper 57'; Syafiq Izzudin 62' | Stadium: MMU Stadium; Attendance: 35; Referee: Mohd Hafiz Zharif Bin Ahmad Jafri |

| 29 December 2024 | PIB Shah Alam | 0–8 | Bunga Raya Damansara | Nilai |
| 16:45 UTC+8 | | Report | Kogileswaran Raj 32' (pen.), 44'; Nicolas Vargas 45+4' (pen.), 62'; N. Insaurralde 58', 65'; Alifh Aiman 67'; Taha M. Khalid 74' | Stadium: USIM Stadium; Attendance: 50; Referee: Mohamed Fahmi Ibrahim |

| 30 December 2024 | Kuala Lumpur Rovers | 2–2 | Gombak | Cheras, Kuala Lumpur |
| 16:45 UTC+8 | Amirul Husaini 52'; Amirul Nizam 90+5' | Report | Alif Safwan 1'; Rusydan Wahid 35' | Stadium: Kuala Lumpur Stadium; Attendance: 75; Referee: Zulkarnian Zakaria |

| 31 December 2024 | UiTM United | 1–5 | PT Athletic | Shah Alam |
| 16:45 UTC+8 | Farhan Rahim 58' | Report | Afif Jazimin 58'; Indra Putra 29' (pen.); Fandi Othman 45+2' (pen.); Nurshamil 68', 90+3' | Stadium: UiTM Stadium; Attendance: 150; Referee: Zulkarnian Zakaria |

=== Matchweek 25 ===
| 10 January 2025 | Bunga Raya Damansara | 0–1 | Kuala Lumpur Rovers | Shah Alam |
| 16:45 UTC+8 | | Report | Faiz Mazlan 8' | Stadium: UiTM Stadium; Attendance: 120; Referee: Amirul Izzat Rusli |

| 10 January 2025 | Manjung City | 6–2 | Bukit Tambun | Seri Manjung |
| 20:45 UTC+8 | Hariswaran Haridas 10'; Saifuddin Khairil Anuar 27', 58'; Syamin Baharuddin 41', 54'; Kayden Soper 61' | Report | Husnul Irsal Amran 26'; Nurfais Johari 90' (pen.) | Stadium: Manjung Stadium; Attendance: 136; Referee: Muhammad Firdaus Ibrahim |

| 11 January 2025 | PT Athletic | 2–2 | YPM FC | Cyberjaya |
| 16:45 UTC+8 | Amri 20'; Nurshamil 37' | Report | Badrul Amin Jesmi 9'; Helmi Abdullah 54' | Stadium: MMU Stadium; Attendance: 45; Referee: Mohd Hafiz Zharif Bin Ahmad Jafri |

| 11 January 2025 | Armed Forces | 1–1 | Immigration | Kuala Lumpur |
| 16:45 UTC+8 | Faiz Ibrahim 74' | Report | Hafiz Kamal 88' | Stadium: Mindef Stadium; Attendance: 215; Referee: Zam Azwan Khan |

| 12 January 2025 | UiTM United | 6–0 | Harini | Shah Alam |
| 16:45 UTC+8 | Aman Syamim 79' (pen.); Ahmad Haikal 80'; Wan Syamil 82', 88', 90' (pen.); Arif Imran 84' | Report | | Stadium: UiTM Stadium; Attendance: 150; Referee: Mursyid Baharom |

| 12 January 2025 | Machan | 1–4 | Gombak | Bangi |
| 16:45 UTC+8 | Azafrul Farish 62' (pen.) | Report | Khairi Suffian 17'; Alif Safwan 34'; Khairil Anuar 38'; Emanuel Corvelloni 71' | Stadium: UKM Bangi Stadium; Attendance: 40; Referee: Hafizuan Mohd Khair |

| 12 January 2025 | Malaysian University | 0–4 | Melaka | Kuala Lumpur |
| 16:45 UTC+8 | | Report | Fahmi Faizal 2'; Azim Rahim 5', 18'; Nizaruddin Jazi 57' | Stadium: UM Arena Stadium; Attendance: 85; Referee: Anselm Anak Enterang |

=== Matchweek 26 ===
| 17 January 2025 | Manjung City | 1–4 | Malaysian University | Seri Manjung |
| 20:45 UTC+8 | Saifuddin 29' | Report | Izzul Azmi 10'; Syahir 27'; Wan Aqil Hakimi 39'; Zulkarnain Nasir 43' | Stadium: Manjung Stadium; Attendance: 103; Referee: Abu Bakar Ghazali |

| 17 January 2025 | Machan | 0–4 | Armed Forces | Kuala Lumpur |
| 16:45 UTC+8 | | Report | Ogolo Williams 27', 32'; Faiz Ibrahim 45'; Zafri Zakaria 62' | Stadium: Mindef Stadium; Attendance: 95; Referee: Atik Kassim |

| 18 January 2025 | YPM FC | 3–4 | UiTM United | Gambang |
| 16:45 UTC+8 | Wan Muhammad Akmal 22'; Azamuddin Akil 50' (pen.), 58' | Report | Arif Imran 9'; Irsyad Ahmad Radhuan 13'; Ahmad Haikal Haziq 41'; Wan Syamil Sulaiman 61' | Stadium: SSMP (UMPSA) Mini Stadium; Attendance: 47; Referee: Ismail Saidi |

| 18 January 2025 | PT Athletic | 4–3 | PIB Shah Alam | Cyberjaya |
| 16:45 UTC+8 | Afif Jazimin 15'; Syazwan Zainon 48'; Nurshamil Abd Ghani 53'; Indra Putra 90+3' | Report | Khairu Anwar Khazali 55', 68'; Nik Azli 74' | Stadium: MMU Stadium; Attendance: 59; Referee: Fusser Sallih |

| 18 January 2025 | Bukit Tambun | 0–4 | Bunga Raya Damansara | Batu Kawan |
| 20:45 UTC+8 | | Report | Taha M Khalid 45', 45+2'; Nicolas Vargas Valinotti 49'; Kogileswaran Raj 72' (pen.) | Stadium: Penang State Stadium; Attendance: 30; Referee: Khairul Fadzri Naim bin Yusri |

| 18 January 2025 | Melaka | 3–1 | Kuala Lumpur Rovers | Krubong |
| 20:45 UTC+8 | Nasir Basharudin 45+2'; Azim Rahim 62'; Khairul 75' | Report | Rafie Yaacob 14' | Stadium: Hang Jebat Stadium; Attendance: 245; Referee: Mohd Shahrizan Solihim |

| 19 January 2025 | Immigration | 1–2 | Gombak | Bangi |
| 16:45 UTC+8 | Kreinraaj Maran 9' | Report | Emanuel Corvelloni 45+2'; Sukri Hamid 55' | Stadium: UKM Bangi Stadium; Attendance: 240; Referee: Radzi Asari |

=== Matchweek 27 ===
| 22 November 2024 | Bunga Raya Damansara | 6–1 | Machan | Shah Alam |
| 20:45 UTC+8 | Fazli Ghazali 31'; Raja Imran Shah 35'; Marcus Mah 38'; N. Insaurralde 47'; Khair Jones 90+4'; Cassey Lipa 53' (o.g.) | Report | Haziq Shah 14' | Stadium: UiTM Stadium; Attendance: 53; Referee: Mursyid Baharom |

| 24 January 2025 | UiTM United | 5–1 | Bukit Tambun | Shah Alam |
| 16:45 UTC+8 | Ahmad Haikal Haziq 27'; Haziq Deli 46', 83'; Arif Imran 49'; Norshahrul Nizam 86' | Report | Syaizwan Irfan Saide 18' (o.g.) | Stadium: UiTM Stadium; Attendance: 150; Referee: Muhammad Afiq Naim |

| 24 January 2025 | YPM FC | 4–1 | Harini | Gambang |
| 16:45 UTC+8 | Hilmi Husaini 33'; Haziq Izzuddin 47'; Badrul Amin 85'; Syawal Norsam 90+1' | Report | Nur Areff Kamaruddin 71' | Stadium: SSMP (UMPSA) Mini Stadium; Attendance: 52; Referee: Saifuddin Abu Bakar |

| 25 January 2025 | PIB Shah Alam | 0–8 | Immigration | Nilai |
| 16:45 UTC+8 | | Report | Furqan Azri 4'; Thankgod Michael 16', 88'; Faisal Rosli 23'; Nasriq 30'; Felipe De Lima 38'; Tg. Mohd Norzaiful 39'; Hazim 45' | Stadium: USIM Stadium; Attendance: 50; Referee: Latiffi Zahrom |

| 26 January 2025 | Malaysian University | 3–0 | PT Athletic | Kuala Lumpur |
| 16:45 UTC+8 | Muhammad Izzul Azmi 8', 21'; Syahir Abdul Rahman 88' | Report | | Stadium: UM Arena Stadium; Attendance: 75; Referee: Mohd Atik Kassim |

| 26 January 2025 | Armed Forces | 0–1 | Melaka | Kuala Lumpur |
| 16:45 UTC+8 | | Report | Azim Rahim 44' (pen.) | Stadium: Mindef Stadium; Attendance: 250; Referee: Muhammad Afiq Naim |

| 26 January 2025 | Gombak | 1–1 | Manjung City | Selayang |
| 16:45 UTC+8 | Alif Safwan 28' | Report | Syamin Baharuddin 41' (pen.) | Stadium: Selayang Stadium; Attendance: 93; Referee: Mohd Sufi Bin Lion@Rozan |

=== Matchweek 28 ===
| 31 January 2025 | PT Athletic | 1–3 | Armed Forces | Cyberjaya |
| 16:45 UTC+8 | Mohd Amri Yahyah 84' | Report | Rafael Shahzari Foo 12'; Adib Zainudin 70' (o.g.); Ogolo Williams 90+3' | Stadium: MMU Stadium; Attendance: 24; Referee: Mohd Hafiz Zharif bin Ahmad Jafri |

| 1 February 2025 | Malaysian University | 3–1 | Harini | Kuala Lumpur |
| 16:45 UTC+8 | Zulkarnain Nasir 50', 55'; Aizzat Hakimi Zaini 84' (o.g.) | Report | S.Chanthuru 6' | Stadium: UM Arena Stadium; Attendance: 51; Referee: Zulkarnian Zakaria |

| 1 February 2025 | Bukit Tambun | 1–3 | YPM FC | Batu Kawan |
| 16:45 UTC+8 | Sadam Hashim 70' | Report | Azamuddin Akil 41', 74'; Amierul Ismail 48' (pen.) | Stadium: Penang State Stadium; Attendance: 20; Referee: Khairul Fadzri Naim Bin Yusri |

| 1 February 2025 | Melaka | 0–0 | Immigration | Krubong |
| 20:45 UTC+8 | | Report | | Stadium: Hang Jebat Stadium; Attendance: 804; Referee: Zamzaidi Katimin |

| 2 February 2025 | Kuala Lumpur Rovers | 3–0 | PIB Shah Alam | Cheras, Kuala Lumpur |
| 16:45 UTC+8 | Amirul Husaini 42', 52'; Faizal Hafiq 86' | Report | | Stadium: Kuala Lumpur Stadium; Attendance: 100; Referee: Ahmad Zuhadi Dzulkifli |

| 2 February 2025 | Manjung City | 1–0 | Bunga Raya Damansara | Seri Manjung |
| 20:45 UTC+8 | Saifuddin Khairil Anuar 8' | Report | | Stadium: Manjung Stadium; Attendance: 154; Referee: Abu Bakar Ghazali |

| 14 February 2025 | UiTM United | 3–2 | Gombak | Shah Alam |
| 16:45 UTC+8 | Arif Imran 21'; Zikry Hafis 45'; Haziq Deli 90' | Report | Alif Safwan 11', 62' | Stadium: UiTM Stadium; Attendance: 200; Referee: Amirul Izzat Rusli |

=== Matchweek 29 ===
| 6 February 2025 | Machan | 0–6 | UiTM United | Melaka City |
| 16:45 UTC+8 | | Report | Arif Imran 42'; Aman Syamim 58' (pen.); Asyraaf Rifqi 64', 73'; Putra Daniel 82'; Wan Syamil 85' | Stadium: Hang Tuah Stadium; Attendance: 120; Referee: Zamzaidi Katimin |

| 7 February 2025 | Bunga Raya Damansara | 1–6 | Melaka | Shah Alam |
| 16:45 UTC+8 | Fazli Ghazali 90' | Report | Nizarruddin Jazi 23'; Luqmanul Hakeem 27'; Azim Rahim 53', 78'; Royizzat Daud 64'; Fakhrullah Rosli 88' | Stadium: UiTM Stadium; Attendance: 70; Referee: Abdul Rahman Wahab |

| 7 February 2025 | PT Athletic | 0–2 | Gombak | Cyberjaya |
| 16:45 UTC+8 | | Report | Isa Raman 28'; Alif Safwan 86' | Stadium: MMU Stadium; Attendance: 64; Referee: Mohd Johafahmi Bin Taib |

| 8 February 2025 | YPM FC | 2–0 | Kuala Lumpur Rovers | Gambang |
| 16:45 UTC+8 | Syawal Norsam 20', 51' | Report | | Stadium: SSMP (UMPSA) Mini Stadium; Attendance: 56; Referee: Kishandharan Gopal |

| 8 February 2025 | Harini | 4–6 | Bukit Tambun | Sepang |
| 16:45 UTC+8 | G. Thipen Raj 3', 75'; Nazief Ikhwan 58'; Aizzat Hakimi 90+1' | Report | Hasrul Che Halim 7' (pen.); Aizat Safuan 14' (pen.), 31', 67'; Nurfais Johari 58'; Rafiuddin Roddin 42' | Stadium: Salak Tinggi Mini Stadium; Attendance: 50; Referee: Muhammad Harris Sharuddin |

| 9 February 2025 | PIB Shah Alam | 0–6 | Malaysian University | Nilai |
| 16:45 UTC+8 | | Report | Izzul Azmi 29', 45'; Arif Danial 34'; Zahrul Nizam 60'; Zulkarnain Nasir 64', 78' | Stadium: USIM Stadium; Attendance: 50; Referee: Helbe Bin Mositing |

| 9 February 2025 | Immigration | 4–0 | Manjung City | Bangi |
| 16:45 UTC+8 | ThankGod Michael 45+4', 49', 83'; Naaim Firdaus 87' | Report | | Stadium: UKM Bangi Stadium; Attendance: 250; Referee: Zulkarnian Zakaria |

=== Matchweek 30 ===
| 14 February 2025 | Armed Forces | 1–1 | Manjung City | Kuala Lumpur |
| 16:45 UTC+8 | Hairul Iqmal 31' | Report | Saifuddin Khairil Anuar 61' | Stadium: Mindef Stadium; Attendance: 270; Referee: Ahmad Zuhadi Dzulkifli |

| 22 February 2025 | PIB Shah Alam | 6–4 | Harini | Nilai |
| 16:45 UTC+8 | Aiman Mohamad 12'; Azriddin Rosli 31'; Ridhwan Nazri 41'; Hadzeq Faudzi 60'; Amir Hafiz Noor 76'; Idris Ahmad 77' | Report | Nur Areff Kamaruddin 46'; Rafiq Shah Zaim 51'; Afiq Haikal 68'; Nurhakimin Ghazali 69' | Stadium: USIM Stadium; Attendance: 20; Referee: Mohamad Hafizi Mohamad Nor Hazalin |

| 22 February 2025 | Immigration | 2–1 | YPM FC | Bangi |
| 16:45 UTC+8 | Furqan Azri 24'; Hazim Abu Zaid 77' | Report | Ilham Yusof 9' | Stadium: UKM Bangi Stadium; Attendance: 300; Referee: Atik Kassim |

| 22 February 2025 | Kuala Lumpur Rovers | 5–2 | PT Athletic | Cheras, Kuala Lumpur |
| 16:45 UTC+8 | Amirul Husaini 42', 76', 85'; Sharul Amin 43'; Syamim Yahya 81' (pen.) | Report | Khairul Asyraf 6'; Afif Jazimin 67' | Stadium: Kuala Lumpur Stadium; Attendance: 87; Referee: Amir Fakhri Ismail |

| 22 February 2025 | UiTM United | 2–2 | Malaysian University | Shah Alam |
| 16:45 UTC+8 | Haziq Deli 51'; Amirul Fazly Zamri 9' (o.g.) | Report | Zulkarnain Nasir 27' (pen.); Vickie Owen Marinus 86' | Stadium: UiTM Stadium; Attendance: 200; Referee: Ridzuan Husni |

| 22 February 2025 | Gombak | 0–4 | Bunga Raya Damansara | Selayang |
| 16:45 UTC+8 | | Report | Fazli Ghazali 13'; Kogileswaran Raj 18', 48'; Raja Imran Shah 23' | Stadium: Selayang Stadium; Attendance: 52; Referee: Abdul Rahman Wahab |

| 22 February 2025 | Melaka | 7–2 | Machan | Krubong |
| 20:45 UTC+8 | Fakhrullah Rosli 20'; Fuseini Issah 23' (pen.), 33', 44'; Nasir Basharudin 53'; Nizarruddin Jazi 65', 90' | Report | Haziq Shah Putra Zulkafli 13', 89' | Stadium: Hang Jebat Stadium; Attendance: 1,467; Referee: Usaid Jamal |

== Season statistics ==
=== Top goalscorers ===
As of 22 February 2025

| Rank | Player | Team | Goals |
|---|---|---|---|
| 1 | (Malaysia) Azim Rahim | Melaka | 22 |
| 2 | (Nigeria) Thankgod Michael | Immigration | 21 |
| 3 | (Ghana) Fuseini Issah | Melaka | 16 |
| 4 | (Ghana) Ogolo Williams Wisdom | Armed Forces | 13 |
| 4 | (Malaysia) Amirul Husaini | KL Rovers | 13 |
| 4 | (Malaysia) Zulkarnain Nasir | Malaysian University | 13 |
| 4 | (Malaysia) Amri Yahyah | PT Athletics | 13 |
| 8 | (Malaysia) R. Kogileswaran | BR Damansara | 12 |
| 8 | (Malaysia) Nurshamil Abd Ghani | PT Athletics | 12 |
| 10 | (Malaysia) Saifuddin Khairil Anuar | Manjung City | 10 |
| 10 | (Malaysia) Nizaruddin Jazi | Melaka | 10 |
| 10 | (Malaysia) Azamuddin Akil | YPM FC | 10 |
| 13 | (Malaysia) Aizat Safuan | Bukit Tambun | 9 |
| 13 | (Malaysia) Rafie Yaacob | KL Rovers | 9 |
| 13 | (Malaysia) Syamin Baharuddin | Manjung City | 9 |
| 16 | (Malaysia) Isa Raman | Gombak | 8 |
| 16 | (Malaysia) Danial Ashraf | PIB Shah Alam | 8 |

=== Own goals ===
As of 22 February 2025

| Rank | Player | Team | Against | Date | Number |
|---|---|---|---|---|---|
| 1 | (Malaysia) Irsyad Ahmad Radhuan | UiTM United | BR Damansara | 4 August 2024 | 1 |
| 1 | (Malaysia) Arif Imran | UiTM United | Gombak | 5 October 2024 | 1 |
| 1 | (Malaysia) Nuh Azlan Syah | UiTM United | Immigration | 12 October 2024 | 1 |
| 1 | (Malaysia) Tasnim Fitri | PIB Shah Alam | Manjung City | 16 November 2024 | 1 |
| 1 | (Malaysia) Cassey Lipa Edward | Machan | BR Damansara | 22 November 2024 | 1 |
| 1 | (Malaysia) Ikhwan Hakim Abdul Halim | UiTM United | Melaka | 3 December 2024 | 1 |
| 1 | (Malaysia) Syaizwan Irfan Saide | UiTM United | Bukit Tambun | 24 January 2025 | 1 |
| 1 | (Malaysia) Adib Zainudin | PT Athletic | Armed Forces | 31 January 2025 | 1 |
| 1 | (Malaysia) Aizzat Hakimi Zaini | Harini | Malaysian University | 1 February 2025 | 1 |
| 1 | (Malaysia) Amirul Fazly Zamri | Malaysian University | UiTM United | 22 February 2025 | 1 |

=== Hat-tricks ===
As of 22 February 2025

| Player | For | Against | Result | Date |
|---|---|---|---|---|
| (Malaysia) Rafie Yaacob | Kuala Lumpur Rovers | Harini | 6–0 (H) | 30 June 2024 |
| (Malaysia) Azim Rahim | Melaka | Harini | 3–1 (H) | 13 July 2024 |
| (Malaysia) Azim Rahim (2) | Melaka | YP Maintenance | 3–0 (H) | 10 August 2024 |
| (Malaysia) Nur Aliff Farhan | YPM | Harini | 0–7 (A) | 7 September 2024 |
| (Malaysia) Syamin Baharuddin | Manjung City | Machan | 4–0 (H) | 18 October 2024 |
| (Malaysia) N. Javabilaarivin | Immigration | Machan | 1–6 (A) | 25 October 2024 |
| (Nigeria) Adam Azeez Arisekola^{4} | PT Athletic | Harini | 4–1 (H) | 29 October 2024 |
| (Malaysia) Amirul Husaini | Kuala Lumpur Rovers | Machan | 10–1 (H) | 17 November 2024 |
| (Malaysia) Amer Saidin | Kuala Lumpur Rovers | Machan | 10–1 (H) | 17 November 2024 |
| (Malaysia) Sharul Amin | Kuala Lumpur Rovers | Machan | 10–1 (H) | 17 November 2024 |
| (Ghana) Ogolo Williams Wisdom | Armed Forces | PIB Shah Alam | 8–0 (H) | 7 December 2024 |
| (Malaysia) Azafrul Farish Azman | Machan | PIB Shah Alam | 0–5 (A) | 20 December 2024 |
| (Malaysia) Wan Syamil Sulaiman | UiTM United | Harini | 6–0 (H) | 12 January 2025 |
| (Malaysia) Aizat Safuan | Bukit Tambun | Harini | 4–6 (A) | 8 February 2025 |
| (Nigeria) Thankgod Michael | Immigration | Manjung City | 4–0 (H) | 9 February 2025 |
| (Malaysia) Amirul Husaini Zamri | Kuala Lumpur Rovers | PT Athletic | 5–2 (H) | 22 February 2025 |
| (Ghana) Fuseini Issah | Melaka | Machan | 7–2 (H) | 22 February 2025 |

Notes (H) – Home team (A) – Away team ^{4} – Player scored 4 goals

=== Clean sheets ===
As of 2 February 2025

| Rank | Player | Team | Clean sheets |
|---|---|---|---|
| 1 | (Malaysia) Ameerul Eqhwan | Melaka | 14 |
| 2 | (Malaysia) Asyraaf Omar | KL Rovers | 13 |
| 3 | (Malaysia) Izarul Adli | Immigration | 9 |
| 4 | (Malaysia) Ashraf Fadhil | Malaysian University | 8 |
| 5 | (Malaysia) M. Satthyvel | BR Damansara | 7 |
| 6 | (Malaysia) Nik Amin Ahmad | PT Athletic | 5 |
| 6 | (Malaysia) T. Shaheeswaran | Melaka | 5 |
| 6 | (Malaysia) Nasrullah Aziz | Manjung City | 5 |
| 6 | (Malaysia) Hafizuddin Azuhar | Armed Forces | 5 |
| 10 | (Malaysia) Shahrizan Syafiq Adzman | Armed Forces | 3 |
| 10 | (Malaysia) Izzat Abd. Rahim | PIB Shah Alam | 3 |
| 10 | (Malaysia) Aqil Fadhly Yusop | Gombak | 3 |
| 10 | (Malaysia) Farhan Abdul Majid | BR Damansara | 3 |

== See also ==
- 2024 Piala Sumbangsih
- 2024–25 Malaysia Super League
- 2024–25 Malaysia A2 Amateur League
- 2024–25 Malaysia A3 Community League
- 2024 Malaysia FA Cup
- 2024–25 Malaysia Cup
- 2024–25 MFL Cup
- 2024–25 Piala Presiden
- 2024–25 Piala Belia
