= 2022 UiTM FC season =

UiTM FC
2022 season
- President: Mohd. Sazili Shahibi
- CEO: Mustaza Ahmad
- Head coach: Ismail Ibrahim
- Stadium: UiTM Stadium
- Malaysia Super League: 7th
- Malaysia FA Cup: First round
- Malaysia Cup: Round of 16
- Top goalscorer: Zafri Zakaria; Alif Safwan (3)
- Average home league attendance: 0

The 2022 season was UiTM FC's 14th in existence and their 1st season in the second-tier of Malaysian football since relegation last season. The team competed in Malaysia Premier League, the Malaysia FA Cup and the Malaysia Cup.

Ismail Ibrahim has been appointed as the club's new head coach.

== Coaching staff ==
- Head coach: Ismail Ibrahim
- Assistant head coach: Shahreen Nizam Sharudin
- Goalkeeping coach: Abd Jalil Man
- Fitness coach: Zaiham Abd Hamid
- Team doctor: Wan Mohamad Izham
- Physiotherapist: Ahmad Hanbal Raman

== Players ==
=== First-team squad ===
Note: Flags indicate national team as defined under FIFA eligibility rules; some limited exceptions apply. Players may hold more than one non-FIFA nationality.

No.	Pos.	Nation	Player
1	GK	MAS	Ameerul Eqhwan
2	DF	MAS	Azeddy Misra
4	DF	MAS	Zafri Zakaria
6	DF	MAS	Hakim Ismail
7	FW	MAS	Hizaz Lokman
8	MF	MAS	Nazirul Hasif
9	FW	GHA	George Attram (on loan from Selangor)
10	FW	MAS	Rafie Yaacob
11	FW	MAS	Afzal Akbar
14	MF	MAS	Izman Solehin
15	DF	MAS	Farhan Rahim
19	FW	MAS	Alif Safwan
20	MF	MAS	Amirul Aiman (vice-captain)
21	DF	MAS	Faris Zabri
22	GK	MAS	Ramdhan Hamid (vice-captain)

No.	Pos.	Nation	Player
23	DF	MAS	Izaaq Izhan (captain)
25	MF	MAS	Azriddin Rosli
27	MF	MAS	Zharif Nazhan
28	FW	MAS	Farez Aiman
29	MF	MAS	Arham Khussyairi (vice-captain)
30	MF	MAS	Fahmi Sabri
32	DF	MAS	Nashran Elias
33	GK	MAS	Amir Haikal
34	MF	MAS	Eizrul Ashraf
36	MF	MAS	Amir Adha
47	MF	MAS	Faris Hafiz
55	DF	MAS	Syed Muadz
56	FW	MAS	Danial Romizan
88	GK	MAS	Rendy Rining (vice-captain)

=== Transfers in ===
Note: Flags indicate national team as defined under FIFA eligibility rules; some limited exceptions apply. Players may hold more than one non-FIFA nationality.

No.	Pos.	Nation	Player
22	GK	MAS	Ramdhan Hamid (from Kelantan United)

== Statistics ==
=== Appearances and goals ===
No.	Pos	Nat	Player	Total		League		FA Cup		Malaysia Cup	
No.	Pos	Nat	Player	Apps	Goals	Apps	Goals	Apps	Goals	Apps	Goals
Goalkeepers
1	GK	(Malaysia) MAS	Ameerul Eqhwan	1	0	1	0	0	0	0	0
22	GK	(Malaysia) MAS	Ramdhan Hamid	12	0	12	0	0	0	0	0
88	GK	(Malaysia) MAS	Rendy Rining	8	0	5	0	1	0	2	0
Defenders
2	DF	(Malaysia) MAS	Azeddy Misra	2	0	0+2	0	0	0	0	0
4	DF	(Malaysia) MAS	Zafri Zakaria	10	3	7+1	3	0	0	2	0
6	DF	(Malaysia) MAS	Hakim Ismail	12	0	10	0	1	0	1	0
15	DF	(Malaysia) MAS	Farhan Rahim	1	0	0+1	0	0	0	0	0
21	DF	(Malaysia) MAS	Faris Zabri	14	0	8+3	0	1	0	1+1	0
23	DF	(Malaysia) MAS	Izaaq Izhan	18	0	10+5	0	1	0	2	0
32	DF	(Malaysia) MAS	Nashran Elias	15	0	10+3	0	0+1	0	0+1	0
Midfielders
8	MF	(Malaysia) MAS	Nazirul Hasif	15	2	4+10	2	0	0	0+1	0
14	MF	(Malaysia) MAS	Izman Solehin	10	2	4+4	2	0	0	2	0
20	MF	(Malaysia) MAS	Amirul Aiman	20	1	16+1	1	1	0	2	0
25	MF	(Malaysia) MAS	Azriddin Rosli	17	0	9+5	0	1	0	0+2	0
27	MF	(Malaysia) MAS	Zharif Nazhan	11	1	8+3	1	0	0	0	0
29	MF	(Malaysia) MAS	Arham Khussyairi	16	0	11+3	0	0	0	2	0
30	MF	(Malaysia) MAS	Fahmi Sabri	15	0	7+7	0	0+1	0	0	0
34	MF	(Malaysia) MAS	Eizrul Ashraf	17	0	9+6	0	1	0	0+1	0
36	MF	(Malaysia) MAS	Amir Adha	15	1	10+4	1	0+1	0	0	0
47	MF	(Malaysia) MAS	Faris Hafiz	19	2	15+1	2	1	0	2	0
Forwards
7	FW	(Malaysia) MAS	Hizaz Lokman	12	0	1+8	0	0+1	0	0+2	0
9	FW	(Ghana) GHA	George Attram	2	1	0	0	0	0	2	1
10	FW	(Malaysia) MAS	Rafie Yaacob	18	1	12+3	1	1	0	2	0
11	FW	(Malaysia) MAS	Afzal Akbar	21	1	18	1	1	0	2	0
19	FW	(Malaysia) MAS	Alif Safwan	15	3	8+6	3	1	0	0	0
28	FW	(Malaysia) MAS	Farez Aiman	18	2	3+12	1	0+1	0	0+2	1
Players transferred out during the season

Last updated: 17 September 2022
Source: Competitions

== Competitions ==
=== Malaysia Premier League ===
Pos	Team	Pld	W	D	L	GF	GA	GD	Pts	Qualification or relegation
5	Kelantan United	18	6	7	5	23	19	+4	25	Promotion to Super League and Qualification to Malaysia Cup
6	PDRM	18	6	3	9	20	28	−8	21	Promotion to Super League and Qualification to Malaysia Cup
7	UiTM (D)	18	6	2	10	18	25	−7	20	Withdrawn from Liga Super and relegated to Al-ikhsan Cup (Note: UiTM FC withdrew from Liga Super before the start of 2023 season.)
8	Selangor II (Note: Johor Darul Ta'zim II, Selangor II, and Terengganu II aren't eligible to promote as their parent clubs (Johor Darul Ta'zim, Selangor, and Terengganu) play in the Super League. These feeder teams can only play in leagues below their parents'. They also can't play in the Malaysian Cup as they're only eligible to play in the Malaysian Cup if their parents fail to do so (which is not possible currently).)	18	4	4	10	14	25	−11	16	Relocated to MFL Cup
9	Perak	18	5	2	11	16	30	−14	8 (Note: Perak have been deducted three points on 1st April for breaching the finances regulation. Later, six points more were deducted on 15th April following the failure to pay the players and officials salary one day before.)	Promotion to Super League

Updated to match(es) played on 4 September 2022. Source: MFL
Rules for classification: 1) Points; 2) Goal difference; 3) Number of goals scored.
(D) Disqualified
Notes:

Win Draw Loss

15 August 2022 1	Kelantan United	3–1	UiTM

19 March 2022 2	UiTM	0–1	Selangor

25 March 2022 3	UiTM	0–3	Kelantan

9 April 2022 4	UiTM	1–2	Johor Darul Ta'zim II

23 April 2022 5	UiTM	1–2	Kelantan United

27 April 2022 6	Terengganu II	2–0	UiTM

7 May 2022 7	UiTM	0–2	Kuching City

17 May 2022 8	FAM-MSN Project	0–1	UiTM

21 May 2022 9	Perak	0–2	UiTM

28 May 2022 10	UiTM	1–1	PDRM

25 June 2022 11	UiTM	3–0	Terengganu II

18 July 2022 12	Kelantan	1–0	UiTM

26 July 2022 13	Johor Darul Ta'zim II	4–0	UiTM

5 August 2022 14	Selangor 2	0–0	UiTM

10 August 2022 15	UiTM	4–1	FAM-MSN Project

20 August 2022 16	Kuching City	2–1	UiTM

3 September 2022 17	UiTM	2–1	Perak

17 September 2022 18	PDRM	0–1	UiTM

=== Malaysia FA Cup ===
31 March 2022 First round	Kuching City	2–0	UiTM

=== Malaysia Cup ===
Round of 16

26 October 2022 First leg	UiTM	1–2	Sabah

31 October 2022 Second leg	Sabah	1–1 (3–2 agg.)	UiTM
