= 2023 Melaka F.C. season =

Melaka
2023 season
- Chairman: Muhammad Najmi Nordin
- Manager: Pedro Hipólito
- Stadium: Stadium Hang Tuah; Stadium Hang Jebat
- M3 League: 10th
- FA Cup: Second round
Home colours	Away colours

The 2023 season was the first season in the history of Melaka Football Club. Currently, Melaka participated in two competitions this season, the M3 League and FA Cup.

== Technical staff ==
Position	Name
Team manager	(Malaysia) Muhammad Najmi Nordin
Assistant team manager	(Malaysia) Norizam Ali Hassan
Head coach	(Portugal) Pedro Hipólito
Assistant coaches	(Malaysia) Leong Hong Seng
Goalkeeping coach	(Malaysia) Hazalani Jaafar
Fitness coach	(Malaysia) Rashid Mahmud
Physio	(Malaysia) Prem Ghanesh
Media officer	(Malaysia) Azizi Shahril
Kitman	(Malaysia) Ahmad Syukri Othman

== Players ==
As of 25 February 2023

Note: Flags indicate national team as defined under FIFA eligibility rules; some limited exceptions apply. Players may hold more than one non-FIFA nationality.

No.	Pos.	Nation	Player
1	GK	MAS	Nasrullah Aziz
2	DF	MAS	Fazirhikwan Mat Rani
3	DF	MAS	Syazwan Zaipol
4	DF	MAS	Che Mohamad Arif
5	DF	MAS	Shamerul Abd Aziz
6	DF	MAS	Youwarasan Maniom
9	MF	MAS	Muhammad Shyamierul Razmee Jasmi
10	FW	MAS	Guilherme de Paula (on loan from Johor Darul Ta'zim)
11	MF	MAS	Fakhrullah Rosli
12	MF	MAS	Looga Palanivelu
13	MF	MAS	Ridzuan Razali
14	MF	MAS	Luqmanul Hakeem
15	DF	MAS	Idris Ahmad

No.	Pos.	Nation	Player
16	MF	MAS	Shafiq Al-Hafiz
17	MF	MAS	Thivandaran Karnan
18	GK	MAS	Daniel Wafiuddin
19	FW	MAS	Syahrul Azwari
21	MF	MAS	Aidil Putra Zulkifli
22	GK	MAS	Fahmie Hanapiah
23	MF	MAS	S. Veenod
24	MF	MAS	Farid Khazali
25	FW	MAS	Nor Harith Roslan
27	DF	MAS	Hafiz Johar
28	DF	MAS	Amirul Hamer
30	FW	MAS	Fakhrul Aiman Sidid
33	GK	MAS	Nik Mohd Amin Ahmad

== Competitions ==
=== Overall record ===
Competition	First match	Last match	Starting round	Final position	Record							
Competition	First match	Last match	Starting round	Final position	Pld	W	D	L	GF	GA	GD	Win %
M3 League	3 March 2024	21 October 2023	Matchday 1	10th	24	8	7	9	38	38	+0	33.33
FA Cup	14 April 2023		Second round	Second round	1	0	0	1	0	4	−4	0.00
Total					25	8	7	10	38	42	−4	32.00

Source: Soccerway

=== M3 League ===
==== League table ====
Pos	Team	Pld	W	D	L	GF	GA	GD	Pts	Qualification or relegation
8	Perlis United	24	9	5	10	35	31	+4	32	Withdrew from A1 Semi-Pro League and dissolved (Note: SAINS, Perlis United & Sarawak United all withdrew from Liga M3 and folded before the start of the 2024 season.)
9	PIB Shah Alam	24	9	4	11	32	31	+1	31	
10	Melaka	24	8	7	9	38	38	0	31	
11	Armed Forces	24	7	5	12	34	30	+4	26	
12	Sarawak United	24	1	1	22	18	80	−62	4	Withdrew from A1 Semi-Pro League and dissolved

Source: FAM-CMS
Rules for classification: 1) Points; 2) Goal difference; 3) Number of goals scored.

=== FA Cup ===
Win Draw Loss

14 April 2023 Second round	Terengganu	4–0	Melaka	Kuala Nerus, Terengganu
22:00 UTC+8	Mamut 6'; Hakimi 71'; Mintah 82', 90+3'	Report		Stadium: Sultan Mizan Zainal Abidin Stadium; Attendance: 5,150; Referee: Hasrol Amir
