= Machan F.C. =

Malaysian football club

Machan
- Full name: Machan Football Club
- Short name: MFC
- Founded: 5 September 2022; 4 years ago
- Ground: Hang Tuah Stadium; Azman Hashim Stadium; Sarawak State Stadium
- Capacity: 1,000; 5,000; 26,000
- Owner: Allan Siden Gramong
- Head coach: Mohd Shukri Ismail
- League: Malaysia A1 Semi-Pro League
- 2025–26: Withdrew
Home colours	Away colours

Machan Football Club, simply known as the Machan F.C., is a Malaysian professional football club based in Sibu, Machan, Kanowit District, Sarawak. It last played in the second-tier Malaysia A1 Semi-Pro League. The club's primary home ground is 5,000 capacity Azman Hashim Stadium.

== History ==
Founded in 2022, Machan FC debuted in the Malaysian football scene by participating in the third-tier Al-ikhsan Cup in 2023, finishing third and earning promotion to the Malaysia A1 Semi-Pro League for the 2024–25 season. However, their inaugural season in the A1 league proved challenging, finishing 14th out of 15 clubs. Notably, they suffered a heavy 10–1 defeat to Kuala Lumpur Rovers F.C. on November 17, 2024, marking the highest-scoring match of the season. Despite these setbacks, Machan FC managed to secure victories, including 5–0 over PIB Shah Alam on December 20. On 4 April 2026, the AFL announced they accepted the withdrawal of Machan FC from the 2025–26 Malaysia A1 Semi-Pro League. Machan FC's record was expunged, followed by suspension from the AFL competitions and a RM20,000.00 fine.

== Players ==
As of January 2026

Note: Flags indicate national team as defined under FIFA eligibility rules; some limited exceptions apply. Players may hold more than one non-FIFA nationality.

No.	Pos.	Nation	Player
1	GK	MAS	Firdaus Rashidi
3	DF	KOR	Seungwon Jung
4	DF	MAS	Naqib Sharipuddin
6	MF	ALG	Mohamed Chemseddine Amara
8	MF	MAS	Shyamierul Razmee
10	FW	GHA	Aminu Maiga
11	FW	MAS	Affendi Mohd Sofi
12	MF	MAS	Akhir Bahari (captain)
14	FW	MAS	Amirul Husaini
16	MF	MAS	Sabri Abdul Rahman
18	GK	MAS	Solehin Mamat
20	DF	MAS	Midhyaf Mifdhal

No.	Pos.	Nation	Player
21	MF	MAS	Aiman Syazwi
25	MF	MAS	Alif Haikal Azmi
29	MF	MAS	Danish Irfan Nor Azmi
30	MF	MAS	Za'im Hakim Zakaria
31	DF	MAS	Kama Edyka Azhar
47	MF	MAS	Faizal Talib
66	DF	MAS	Alif Ezzahan
70	DF	MAS	Zarif Syamil Zamani
73	FW	MAS	Zahir Syakil Zamani
74	DF	MAS	Azizan Ab Khalid
82	GK	MAS	Izzul Azry Abu Mansor
88	DF	MAS	Jeremy Lim

== Technical staff ==
As of August 2025

Position	Name
Team manager	(Malaysia) Mohd Fairuz Azwad Mohd Zauwawi
Assistant team manager	(Malaysia) Mohd Shahareen bin Abdullah
Head coach	(Malaysia) Mohd Shukri Ismail
Fitness Coach	(Malaysia) Rashid Mahmud
Physiotherapist	(Malaysia) Muhammad Rozairen Hairudin
Media officer	(Malaysia) Muhammad Ali Iskandar
Kitman	(Malaysia) Muhammad Shukri Abdullah

== Season by season record ==
Season	Division	Position	Malaysia Cup	Malaysian FA Cup	Malaysian Charity Shield	Regional	Top scorer (all competitions)
2023	Liga M4	Semi-finalist	DNQ	DNQ	–	–	(Malaysia) Rozaimi Rahman (7)
2024–25	Liga A1	14th	DNQ	DNQ	–	–	(Malaysia) Azafrul Farish Azman (5)
2025–26	Liga A1	Withdrew	DNQ	DNQ	–	–	Record expunged

Champions	Runners-up	Third place	Promoted	Relegated

== Honours ==
=== League ===
- Sarawak Central Zone DUN League

(gold) Winners (1): 2022

- Malaysia M4 League

(bronze) Third place (1): 2023
