= Akhir Bahari =

Malaysian footballer

Personal information
- Full name: Muhamad Akhir Bin Bahari
- Date of birth: February 22, 1994 (age 32)
- Place of birth: Perak, Malaysia
- Height: 1.69 m (5 ft 6 1/2 in)
- Position: Attacking midfielder

Team information
- Current team: Machan
- Number: 12

Youth career
- 2011–2015: Harimau Muda B

Senior career*
Years	Team	Apps	(Gls)
2011–2015	Harimau Muda B	39	(5)
2015	Harimau Muda	17	(3)
2016	T-Team		
2017	PKNP		
2018	Marcerra Kuantan		
2018	MOF		
2019	Klasiko		
2019	DDM		
2021	KL Rovers		
2024	Gombak		
2025–	Machan		
- * Club domestic league appearances and goals

Muhamad Akhir Bin Bahari (born 22 March 1994) is a Malaysian professional footballer who plays as an attacking midfielder for Malaysia A1 Semi-Pro League club Machan.

== Career ==
Akhir spent his youth career playing for Malaysian youth team Harimau Muda A.
