= Bukit Tambun F.C. =

Football team playing in Malaysia M3 League

Bukit Tambun
- Full name: Bukit Tambun Football Club
- Short name: BTFC
- Founded: 2022; 3 years ago
- Ground: Penang State Stadium
- Capacity: 40,000
- Chairman: Foo Yu Keong
- Head coach: Hasbul Hazani Daud
- League: Malaysia A1 Semi-Pro League
- 2024–25: Malaysia A1 Semi-Pro League, 11th of 15
Home colours	Away colours

Bukit Tambun Football Club, also known as Bukit Tambun, is a professional football club that last played in the Malaysia A1 Semi-Pro League. The club is based in Bandar Cassia, Batu Kawan, Penang, Malaysia.

== History ==
Founded in early 2022, Bukit Tambun made club debut into Malaysian Football League by joining the third-tier league Malaysia M3 League in 2022 Malaysia M3 League.

On 6 March 2022, Bukit Tambun competed in the Malaysia FA Cup for the first time in 2022 and won the preliminary round match 2–1 against Immigration where they progress to the 2nd round against Malaysia Super League club Penang but lost to them 4–0 on 11 March 2022.

Bukit Tambun then participated in the 2024 Malaysia FA Cup facing against Kedah Darul Aman.

== Season by season record ==
Season	Division	Position	Malaysia Cup	Malaysian FA Cup	Malaysian Charity Shield	Regional	Top scorer (all competitions)
2022	Liga M3	6th Group B	DNQ	First round	–	–	(Malaysia) Mohd Syukur Saidin (6)
2023	Liga M3	4th Place	DNQ	DNQ	–	–	(Malaysia) Mohd Syukur Saidin (7)
2024–25	Liga A1 Semi-Pro	11th Place	DNQ	Round of 16	–	–	(Malaysia) Aizat Safuan (7) (Malaysia) Nurfais Johari (7)

== Players (2024) ==
=== First-team squad ===
As of 29 May 2024

Note: Flags indicate national team as defined under FIFA eligibility rules; some limited exceptions apply. Players may hold more than one non-FIFA nationality.

No.	Pos.	Nation	Player
1	GK	MAS	Lau Yik Zhong
4	DF	MAS	Abdul Qayyum
7	MF	MAS	Aizat Safuan
8	MF	MAS	Marcus Mah (on loan from Penang)
10	MF	MAS	Husnul Irsal Amran
11	GK	MAS	Nasrullah Aziz
12	DF	MAS	Syazwi Suhaimi
13	DF	MAS	Afif Azman
15	DF	MAS	Youwarasan Maniom
19	DF	MAS	Keshan Naidu
20	MF	MAS	Rafiuddin Roddin (Captain)
21	MF	MAS	M. Kavindran
22	GK	MAS	Muhammad Asfa
23	FW	MAS	Sadam Hashim
24	MF	MAS	Lokman Hakim Abdullah

No.	Pos.	Nation	Player
25	FW	MAS	Nurfais Johari
27	DF	MAS	Akmal Rizal Suhaimi
28	MF	MAS	Syafiq Heelmi Zainol
30	DF	MAS	Hasrul Che Halim
31	MF	MAS	Zhafir Yusoff
37	MF	MAS	Mu'az Zainal Abidin
66	FW	MAS	Muhammad Asyraaf
77	DF	MAS	B. Sanjef Dinesh
88	DF	MAS	Zharif Desa

== Club staff (2024) ==
Position	Name
Manager	(Malaysia) Muniandy A/L Arumugom
Assistant manager	(Malaysia) Jabri Bin Hasan
Head coach	(Malaysia) Jacob Joseph
Assistant coach	(Malaysia) Kamal Khalid
Goalkeeping coach	(Malaysia) Ramajayam A/L Krishnan
Physiotherapist	(Malaysia) Sukhvinder Singh Sidhu
Doctor	(Malaysia) Thannthiran a/l Manivel
Media officer	(Malaysia) Muarmar Ghadafy B Alias
Kitman	(Malaysia) Mohd Arif Shafiq B Zamzabidi

== Kit manufacturer and shirt sponsor ==
Season	Manufacturer	Sponsor
2022	HakkaClo	Gimmart
2023	AL Sports	GIM Media; MBSB Bank
2024–25	Puma	MBSB Bank; Brotherkita
