= Sadam Hashim =

Malaysian association football player

Personal information
- Full name: Sadam bin Hashim
- Date of birth: 11 August 1992 (age 34)
- Place of birth: Perlis, Malaysia
- Height: 1.69 m (5 ft 7 in)
- Position: Forward

Team information
- Current team: Kuala Perlis Titans
- Number: 12

Senior career*
Years	Team	Apps	(Gls)
2015	Kedah United		
2016	Perlis		
2017–2018	UiTM	36	(4)
2019–2023	Felda United	4	(0)
2023	Perlis United		
2024–2025	Bukit Tambun		
2025–	Kuala Perlis Titans		
- * Club domestic league appearances and goals

Sadam bin Hashim (born 11 August 1992) is a Malaysian professional footballer who plays as a forward for Malaysia A2 Amateur League club Kuala Perlis Titans.
