= Amer Saidin =

Malaysian footballer

Personal information
- Full name: Mohamad Amer bin Saidin
- Date of birth: 25 July 1992 (age 34)
- Place of birth: Penang, Malaysia
- Height: 1.83 m (6 ft 0 in)
- Position: Centre-back

Team information
- Current team: Kuala Lumpur Rovers
- Number: 26

Youth career
- 2009: Bukit Jalil Sports School

Senior career*
Years	Team	Apps	(Gls)
2010–2011	Harimau Muda B	5	(0)
2011–2014	Harimau Muda A	12	(2)
2015–2016	Johor Darul Ta'zim	3	(0)
2017–2020	Johor Darul Ta'zim II	31	(1)
2020	Petaling Jaya City	4	(0)
2021–2022	Sarawak United	16	(0)
2023-	Kuala Lumpur Rovers	0	(0)

International career^{‡}
2011–2014	Malaysia U-23	11	(0)
2016–	Malaysia		
Medal record
Malaysia U23
SEA Games
Gold medal – first place	Sea Games 2011	Football
- * Club domestic league appearances and goals as of 26 March 2023 ‡ National team caps and goals as of October 08, 2016

Mohamad Amer bin Saidin (born 25 July 1992) is a Malaysian footballer who plays as a centre-back for Kuala Lumpur Rovers in the Malaysia A1 Semi-Pro League.

Amer's older brother, Mohd Syukur Saidin, is also a professional footballer.

== Career ==
Amer started his career with Harimau Muda B team in 2010. He was promoted to Harimau Muda A team in 2011. Amer was part of the Malaysia squad for 2014 Asian Games. After several years with Harimau Muda A, Amer joins Malaysia Super League champions, Johor Darul Takzim.

== Honours ==
Harimau Muda A

- International U-21 Football Tournament Thanh Niên Cup: 2012

Johor Darul Ta'zim

- Malaysian Charity Shield: 2015
- Malaysia Super League: 2015
- Malaysia FA Cup: 2016
- AFC Cup: 2015
