= Gombak F.C. =

Malaysian football club

Gombak
- Full name: Gombak Football Club
- Short name: GFC
- Founded: 2015; 10 years ago
- Ground: Selayang Stadium
- Capacity: 16,000
- Chairman: Akmal Halim
- League: Malaysia A1 Semi-Pro League
- 2024–25: Malaysia A1 Semi-Pro League, 7th of 15
Home colours	Away colours	Third colours

Gombak Football Club, simply known as the Gombak F.C., is a Malaysian professional football club based in Gombak, Selangor. It last played in the second-tier Malaysia A1 Semi-Pro League. The club's home ground is the 16,000 capacity Selayang Stadium.

== History ==
Founded in 2015 as Gombak FA, club joined several competitions organized by the Football Association of Selangor in Selangor League and won the 2023 Selangor Champions League for the first time in history. Gombak FA were rebranded and renamed to Gombak FC and made club debut into Malaysian Football League. It got promoted to the second-tier league for 2024–25 season.

== Players (2024) ==
=== First-team squad ===
Note: Flags indicate national team as defined under FIFA eligibility rules; some limited exceptions apply. Players may hold more than one non-FIFA nationality.

No.	Pos.	Nation	Player
1	GK	MAS	Aqil Fadhly
2	MF	MAS	Syazwan Rani
4	MF	MAS	Sukri Hamid
5	DF	BRA	Vinicius Vicente Do Amaral
6	DF	MAS	Saiful Hasnol
7	FW	MAS	Alif Safwan
8	MF	MAS	Khairil Anuar (on loan from Penang)
9	FW	BRA	Emanuel Corvelloni Nascimento
10	MF	MAS	Nazrul Kamaruzaman
11	FW	MAS	Dzulfahmi Abdul Hadi
12	MF	MAS	Akhir Bahari
14	DF	MAS	Danial Hadri
17	MF	MAS	Haikal Sahar
19	FW	MAS	Firdaus Azizul
20	MF	MAS	Syazwan Salihin
24	MF	MAS	Saiful Ridzuwan (Captain)

No.	Pos.	Nation	Player
28	DF	MAS	Ainol Iskandar
29	MF	MAS	Syahwan Abdal
31	MF	MAS	Rusydan Wahid
33	GK	MAS	Hazeem Iman
37	DF	MAS	Gerald Gadit
44	DF	MAS	Fakrul Fareez
47	FW	MAS	Khairi Suffian
55	GK	MAS	Syafiq Sabaruddin
59	DF	MAS	Danish Haziq
97	FW	MAS	Muhammad Isa Raman

== Technical staff (2024) ==
- Team manager: (Malaysia) Mohamed Radziff Hasan
- Head coach: Vacant
- Assistant coach: (Malaysia) Fadhil Hashim
- Assistant coach: (Malaysia) Shahffuwan Hafizi Jalil
- Goalkeeping coach: (Malaysia) Solehin Abdul Wahab
- Fitness coach: (Malaysia) Naim Mazlan
- Physio: (Malaysia) Omky Aswat Suarman
- Media officer: (Malaysia) Shahffuwan Hafizi Abdul Jalil
- Kitman: (Malaysia) Muhammad Aqil Eddi

== Season by season record ==
Season	Division	Position	Malaysia Cup	Malaysian FA Cup	Malaysian Charity Shield	Regional	Top scorer (all competitions)
2023	M5 League	Champions	DNQ	DNQ	–	–	
2024-25	A1 Semi-Pro	7th of 15	DNQ	DNQ	–	–	(Malaysia) Alif Safwan (9)

== Honours ==
=== Domestic competitions ===
- Selangor Champions League

(gold) Winners (1): 2023
