= Nazrul Kamaruzaman =

Malaysian footballer

Personal information
- Full name: Muhammad Nazrul bin Kamaruzaman
- Date of birth: 29 March 1993 (age 33)
- Place of birth: Selangor, Malaysia
- Height: 1.63 m (5 ft 4 in)
- Position: Striker

Team information
- Current team: Gombak F.C.
- Number: 10

Youth career
- 2006–2010: Bukit Jalil Sports School
- 2010–2011: Harimau Muda B
- 2012–2013: Selangor President's Cup Team

Senior career*
Years	Team	Apps	(Gls)
2014–2017	Sime Darby	75	(19)
2018	Felcra	13	(0)
2019	Selangor United	16	(0)
2020	Negeri Sembilan FC	5	(0)
2021–2022	Kuala Lumpur Rovers		
2023	KSR SAINS		
2024–	Gombak		
- * Club domestic league appearances and goals as of 29 July 2024

Muhammad Nazrul bin Kamaruzaman (born 29 March 1993) is a Malaysian professional footballer who plays as a striker.

== Club careers ==
A product of Bukit Jalil Sports School, Nazrul has played for Harimau Muda B and the youth team of Selangor FA. He left Selangor at the end of 2013, never having played for the first team despite becoming top scorer for the Selangor youth team (18 goals) in the 2013 Malaysia President Cup. Subsequently, in 2014 Nazrul joined cross-town team, Kuala Lumpur based Sime Darby F.C., where he made his senior professional debut. His first senior goal was scored in a 3–2 win against league leaders at the time Terengganu FA on 22 March 2014.

== Career statistics ==
=== Club ===
As of 13 July 2019.

Appearances and goals by club, season and competition
Club	Season	League			Cup		League Cup		Continental		Total	
Club	Season	Division	Apps	Goals	Apps	Goals	Apps	Goals	Apps	Goals	Apps	Goals
Felcra	2018	Malaysia Premier League	13	0	1	0	6	2	–		20	2
Felcra	Total		13	0	1	0	6	2	–		20	2
Selangor United	2019	Malaysia Premier League	16	0	1	0	0	0	–		17	0
Selangor United	Career Total		29	0	2	0	6	2	–		37	2

== Honours ==
Sime Darby

- Malaysia FAM League: 2017

Felcra

- Malaysia Premier League runners-up: 2018
