= Aizat Safuan =

Malaysian footballer

Personal information
- Full name: Mohamad Aizat Safuan bin Razali
- Date of birth: 10 March 1999 (age 27)
- Place of birth: Malaysia
- Height: 1.77 m (5 ft 10 in)
- Position: Midfielder

Team information
- Current team: USM
- Number: 23

Youth career
- 2020: Perak

Senior career*
Years	Team	Apps	(Gls)
2021	Perak	2	(0)
2021	Perak II		
2024–2025	Bukit Tambun		
2025–	USM		
- * Club domestic league appearances and goals as of 24 July 2021

Mohamad Aizat Safuan bin Razali (born 10 March 1999) is a Malaysian professional footballer who plays as a midfielder for Malaysia A2 Amateur League club USM.

== Honours ==
USM

- Malaysia A2 Amateur League: Runner-Up 2025–26
