= Nurfais Johari =

Malaysian association football player

Personal information
- Full name: Muhammad Nurfais bin Johari
- Date of birth: 27 March 1999 (age 27)
- Place of birth: Penang, Malaysia
- Height: 1.73 m (5 ft 8 in)
- Position: Midfielder

Team information
- Current team: Bukit Tambun
- Number: 31

Youth career
- 2012–2016: Bukit Jalil Sports School
- 2017: Penang FA Reserves

Senior career*
Years	Team	Apps	(Gls)
2018–2021	Penang	22	(1)
2021–2022	PDRM	4	(0)

International career^{‡}
2017–2018	Malaysia U19	17	(1)
Medal record
Men's football
Representing Malaysia
AFF U-19 Youth Championship
First place	2018 Indonesia
Second place	2017 Myanmar
- * Club domestic league appearances and goals as of 4 September 2021 ‡ National team caps and goals as of 5 February 2019

Muhammad Nurfais bin Johari (born 27 March 1999) is a Malaysian footballer who plays as a midfielder.

== Career ==
He made his professional debut for Penang in a 1–0 Premier League defeat to PDRM on 24 February 2018. In that match, he came on as a late substitute.

== International career ==
=== Youth ===
Nurfais was part of the national team for the 2017 AFF U-18 Youth Championship that will take place in Yangon, Myanmar.

He was named in the Malaysia under 19 squad for 2018 AFF U-19 Youth Championship in the Indonesia. He has played in the final against Myanmar which Malaysia win 4–3.

On 15 October 2018, he was named in the under-19 side for the 2018 AFC U-19 Championship.

== Career statistics ==
=== Club ===
As of 4 September 2021.

Appearances and goals by club, season and competition
Club	Season	League			Cup		League Cup		Continental		Total	
Club	Season	Division	Apps	Goals	Apps	Goals	Apps	Goals	Apps	Goals	Apps	Goals
Penang	2018	Malaysia Premier League	12	1	2	0	5	0	0	0	19	1
Penang	2019	Malaysia Premier League	10	0	1	0	3	1	–		14	1
Penang	2020	Malaysia Premier League	0	0	0	0	0	0	–		0	0
Penang	2021	Malaysia Super League	0	0	0	0	0	0	–		0	0
Total			22	1	3	0	8	1	0	0	33	2
PDRM	2021	Malaysia Premier League	4	0	0	0	0	0	0	0	4	0
PDRM	Total		4	0	0	0	0	0	0	0	4	0

== Honours ==
=== International ===
Malaysia U-19

- AFF U-19 Youth Championship: 2018
- AFF U-19 Youth Championship runners up : 2017

=== Club ===
Penang FA

- Malaysia Premier League :2020
