= UKM Bangi Stadium =

Stadium in Bangi, Selangor, Malaysia

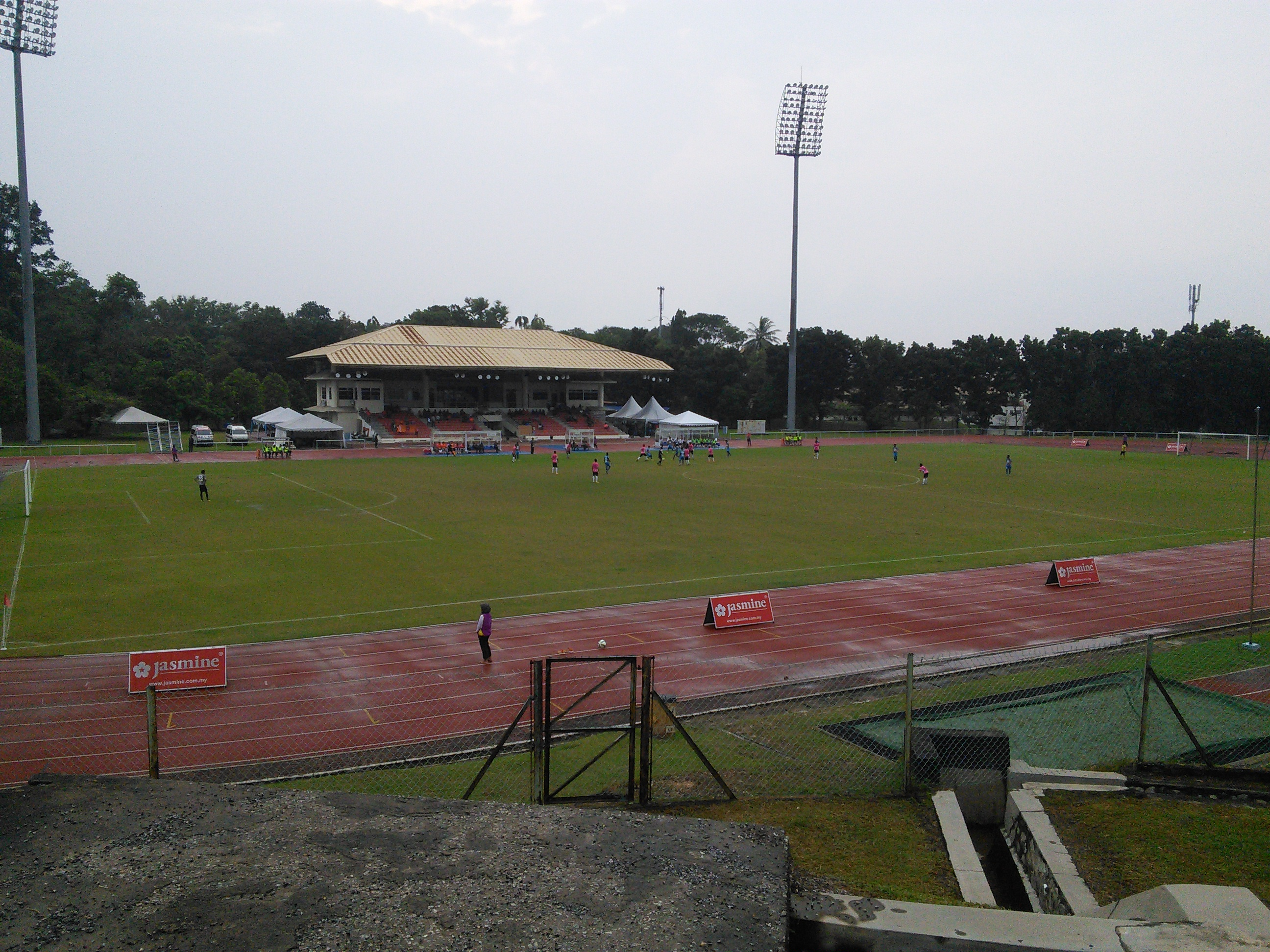
- UKM Bangi Stadium
- Interactive map of UKM Bangi Stadium
- Location: Lingkungan Johan, Bangi, Selangor, Malaysia
- Coordinates: 2°55′55″N 101°47′04″E
- Owner: Universiti Kebangsaan Malaysia
- Operator: Universiti Kebangsaan Malaysia
- Capacity: 2,000
- Surface: Grass
- Scoreboard: Yes

Tenants
- UKM (2013–2017); Real Mulia (2014–2015); Malaysian University FT (2021–present); Immigration; ACeIO

Website
- http://www.ukm.my/pusatsukan/?profile=default

UKM Bangi Stadium is a stadium located at Bangi, Selangor, Malaysia. Its capacity is 2,000. The stadium is built for Universiti Kebangsaan Malaysia football club. It can also be used as a rugby pitch. Activities made by the university are sometimes held in the stadium.

The stadium is currently being used by Malaysia A1 Semi-Pro League football club, Malaysian University FT. The stadium is set to host Malaysian giants, Johor Darul Ta'zim in the 2024 Malaysia FA Cup on 28–30 June 2024.

The ground was selected as one of the venues for the 2026 ACC Men's Premier Cup, hosting twelve matches, while Bayuemas Oval hosted the remaining twelve matches.

== See also ==
- Sport in Malaysia
