= Ridhwan Nazri =

Malaysian footballer

Personal information
- Full name: Muhammad Ridhwan bin Mohd Nazri
- Date of birth: 5 July 2000 (age 26)
- Place of birth: Mentakab, Pahang, Malaysia
- Position: Midfielder

Youth career
- 2017: Tunku Mahkota Ismail Sports School
- 2018–2019: Melaka United
- 2021: Kuala Lumpur City

Senior career*
| Years | Team | Apps | (Gls) |
| 2021–2024 | Kuala Lumpur City | | |
| 2024–2025 | PIB | | |
- * Club domestic league appearances and goals

Muhammad Ridhwan bin Mohd Nazri (born 5 July 2000) is a Malaysian professional footballer who plays as a midfielder.

== Honours ==
Kuala Lumpur City

- Malaysia Cup: 2021
- AFC Cup runner-up: 2022
