= Jacob Joseph (football manager) =

Malaysian football coach (born 1958)

Personal information
- Full name: Jacob a/l M.J. Joseph
- Date of birth: 9 July 1958 (age 68)
- Place of birth: Federation of Malaya
- Height: 1.89 m (6 ft 2 in)

Managerial career
- Years: Team
- 1999–2001: Malaysia women
- 2002–2004: ATM FA
- 2005–2007: Perak Jenderata/UPB FC
- 2008–2010: UPB-MyTeam FC (President Cup team)
- 2010–2011: MP Muar
- 2011–2014: Malaysia women
- 2015–2017: MISC-MIFA
- 2018–2023: Malaysia women
- 2023: NEROCA
- 2024: Uttara
- 2024: Bukit Tambun

Jacob Joseph (born 9 July 1958) is a Malaysian football coach.

== Career ==
His coaching experiences include stints as head coach of Malaysia women's national football team, ATM FA, Perak Jenderata, UPB-MyTeam FC as youth coach, Muar Municipal Council FC, and MISC-MIFA.

In October 2023, Joseph signed with Indian I-League club NEROCA as head coach ahead of the 2023–24 league season.

== Honours ==
MISC-MIFA

- Malaysia FAM League: 2016
