= Alif Safwan =

Malaysian association football player

Personal information
- Full name: Muhammad Alif Safwan bin Mohd Sallahuddin
- Date of birth: 12 February 2000 (age 26)
- Place of birth: Kota Bharu, Malaysia
- Height: 1.81 m (5 ft 11 in)
- Position: Forward

Team information
- Current team: Gombak
- Number: 7

Youth career
- 2017: Malaysia Pahang Sports School
- 2018: PKNP
- 2020: Kuala Lumpur City

Senior career*
Years	Team	Apps	(Gls)
2018–2019	PKNP	7	(0)
2020–2021	Kuala Lumpur City	4	(0)
2022–2023	UiTM FC	14	(3)
2024–	Gombak	20	(4)

International career
2018	Malaysia U-19		
- * Club domestic league appearances and goals

Muhammad Alif Safwan bin Mohd Sallahuddin (born 12 February 2000) is a Malaysian professional footballer who plays as a forward.

== Club career ==
Before UiTM, Alif has played for PKNP and Kuala Lumpur City F.C.

== Honour ==
=== Club ===
Kuala Lumpur City FC

- Malaysia Cup: 2021
