= Rafie Yaacob =

Malaysian footballer

Personal information
- Full name: Muhamad Rafie bin Mat Yaacob
- Date of birth: 2 July 1998 (age 28)
- Place of birth: Gua Musang, Malaysia
- Height: 1.70 m (5 ft 7 in)
- Position: Forward

Team information
- Current team: Kelantan Red Warrior
- Number: 12

Youth career
- 2016: Kelantan U19
- 2017–2019: UiTM U21

Senior career*
Years	Team	Apps	(Gls)
2020–2022	UiTM	42	(2)
2023–2025	Kuala Lumpur Rovers		
2025–	Kelantan Red Warrior		
- * Club domestic league appearances and goals as of 5 March 2023

Muhamad Rafie bin Mat Yaacob (born 2 July 1998) is a Malaysian professional footballer who plays as a forward for Malaysia A1 Semi-Pro League club Kelantan Red Warrior.

== Club career ==
=== UiTM ===
Rafie played for UiTM from 2020 until 2022.
