= Persada Integriti Bersatu F.C. =

Malaysian football club

PIB Shah Alam
- Full name: Persada Integriti Bersatu Shah Alam Football Club
- Short name: PIB
- Founded: 2011; 15 years ago
- Ground: UM Arena; USIM Stadium
- Capacity: 1,500; 3,000
- Chairman: Ikhram Goby Abdullah
- Head coach: Muhamad Azrin Mohamed
- League: Malaysia A1 Semi-Pro League
Home colours	Away colours

PIB Shah Alam Football Club is a football club based in Kuala Lumpur, Malaysia. They last played in the second-tier Malaysia A1 Semi-Pro League. The club's home ground has been the 1,500-seater UM Arena.

== History ==
PIB Football Club was founded in 2011 in Klang Valley, Kuala Lumpur and participated in several regional competitions.

On 17 February 2019, the club competed in the Malaysia FA Cup for the first time in its history.

PIB FC had their first major success in the 2022 Malaysia M3 League season, when they won the league title.

=== Crest ===
2011–2022 crest

== Kit manufacturer and shirt sponsor ==
Season	Manufacturer	Sponsor
2020	unknown	None
2022	Kelme	None
2023-2024–25	AL Sports	MBSB Bank

== Players (2024) ==
Note: Flags indicate national team as defined under FIFA eligibility rules; some limited exceptions apply. Players may hold more than one non-FIFA nationality.

No.	Pos.	Nation	Player
1	GK	MAS	Muhammad Syahmi Yunof
3	MF	MAS	Syukri Azman
4	DF	MAS	Amir Hafiz Mohd Noor
7	MF	MAS	Asyraaf Aqmar Hazuan
8	MF	MAS	Khairu Anwar Khazali
9	MF	MAS	Hafizan Ghazali
10	FW	MAS	Mustakim Mustapha
11	MF	MAS	Adib Hakimi Sabri
14	MF	MAS	Wan Zulhairil Wan Husin
15	DF	MAS	Idris Ahmad (captain)
16	FW	MAS	Jibril Abdul Karim
17	DF	MAS	Aiman Mohamad
18	MF	MAS	Adam Shafiq Fua-ad

No.	Pos.	Nation	Player
22	GK	MAS	Nor Amin Mat Gani
23	GK	MAS	Izzat Abd Rahim
24	DF	MAS	Ibrahim Azfar Harun
25	MF	MAS	Azriddin Rosli
27	DF	MAS	Ahmad Ikhwan Hafiz
29	FW	MAS	Ferris Danial
30	MF	MAS	Abdul Hadi Muhamad
31	MF	MAS	Ridhwan Nazri
32	FW	MAS	Nik Azli
33	FW	MAS	Danial Ashraf
77	MF	MAS	Amirul Azzim Ruzki
88	MF	MAS	Hadzeq Faudzi
99	DF	MAS	Azhar Apandi

== Club personnel (2024) ==
- Team manager: Muhammad Nizar Faris Mohd Basri
- Head coach: Muhamad Azrin Mohamed
- Assistant coach: Mohamad Haris Lajid
- Goalkeeping coach: Azli Mohamad
- Fitness coach: Nazri Abdul Karim
- Team doctor: Nik Mohd Shafikudin Md Taujuddin
- Physiotherapist: Mohammad Nazmi Abdul Halim
- Media manager: Muhammad Affendy Razali

Muhammad Asyraf Borhanudin

- Kitman: Dhia Adwa Mohd Zailani

== Season by season record ==
Updated on 3 September 2023

Season	Division	Position	Malaysia Cup	Malaysian FA Cup	Malaysian Charity Shield	Regional	Top Scorer (All Competitions)
2018	Shah Alam League		DNQ	First round	–	–	
2019	Shah Alam League	1st, Winner; Quarter-finals on M4 League	DNQ	Second round	–	–	
2020^{1}	M3 League	Season abandoned	DNQ	Preliminary round	–	–	None
2021	M3 League	not held due to COVID-19 pandemic					
2022	M3 League	Champions	DNQ	First round	–	–	(Malaysia) Aniq Arami Ismail (6)
2023	M3 League	9th place	DNQ	Second round	–	–	(Malaysia) Jasmir Mehat (8)
2024–25	A1 Semi-Pro League	12th of 15	DNQ	DNQ	–	–	(Malaysia) Danial Ashraf (8)

^1 2020 season cancelled due to the COVID-19 pandemic, no promotion or league title was awarded

Champions	Runners-up	Third place	Promoted	Relegated

== Honours ==
=== League ===
- Division 3/M3 League

(gold) Champions (1): 2022

- Klang Valley League

(gold) Champions (3): 2015, 2016, 2017

- Shah Alam League

(gold) Champions (1): 2019
