= 2025–26 Malaysia A1 Semi-Pro League =

Malaysia A1 Semi-Pro League
- Season: 2025–26
- Dates: 2 August 2025 – 23 May 2026
- Champions: JDT II
- Promoted: Kelantan Red Warrior
- Relegated: Kedah Darul Aman
- Matches: 165
- Goals: 477 (2.89 per match)
- Top goalscorer: Emmanuel Mbarga (Kelantan Red Warrior, 32 goals)
- Biggest home win: Perlis GSA 8–0 Seoul Phoenix (20 December 2025)
- Biggest away win: Seoul Phoenix 0–9 JDT II (11 January 2026)
- Highest scoring: 10 goals Perlis GSA 2–8 Immigration II (27 April 2026)
- Longest winning run: Kelantan WTS (7 matches)
- Longest unbeaten run: Perak FA (14 matches)
- Longest winless run: Kedah Darul Aman (27 matches)
- Longest losing run: Kedah Darul Aman (12 matches)
- Highest attendance: 10,087 (Kelantan Red Warrior 2- 1 Bunga Raya (23 May 2026)
- Lowest attendance: 50 (Machan 0–1 Perlis GSA) (8 August 2025)
- Total attendance: 9,306
- Average attendance: 716
- All statistics correct as of 24 May 2026.

The 2025–26 Malaysia A1 Semi-Pro League was the fifth season of the Malaysia A1 Semi-Pro League, currently the second tier football league in Malaysia, since its establishment in 2019. Melaka will not defend the title as they compete in the 2025–26 Malaysia Super League.

== Competition format ==
The tournament is played as follows:

- League Structure and Matches: Each of the 16 teams competes in a league (likely round-robin) format — playing home and away.
- Qualification / Promotion / Relegation:
  - Mid-season: The top three teams at mid-season qualify for the 2026 Malaysia Cup.
  - End of season: The top two teams are promoted to the next season’s Malaysia Super League.
  - The bottom two teams are relegated to the Malaysia A2 Amateur League.
- Foreign Player Rule:
  - Each team is allowed three foreign players.

== Team changes ==
The following teams have changed division since the 2024–25 season.

=== To the A1 Semi-Pro League ===
▼ Ejected from the Super League

- Kedah Darul Aman^{^{1}}

▲ Promoted the from A2 Amateur League

- Perlis GSA
- Kelantan WTS

Transferred from the MFL Cup

- Johor Darul Ta'zim II
- Selangor II

Invited teams

- Immigration II
- Kedah FA
- Kelantan Red Warrior
- Perak FA
- Seoul Phoenix^{^{2}}
- UM-Damansara United

=== From the A1 Semi-Pro League ===
▲ Promoted to the Super League

- Melaka
- Immigration

▼ Relegated to the A2 Amateur League

- Harini
- Kuala Lumpur Rovers
- UiTM United^{^{3}}
- YPM FC

Withdrew

- Bukit Tambun
- Gombak
- PIB Shah Alam
- Putrajaya Antlers
- Machan

=== Name changes ===
- Bunga Raya Damansara removed "Damansara" from its official name and change their full name to Bunga Raya
- Guar Syed Alwi rebranded to Perlis GSA

Notes:

^1 Expelled from Super League
^2 Invited team from South Korea
^3 KPT appoints UiTM as sports centre

== Stadiums and locations ==
Team	Location	Stadium	Capacity
Armed Forces	Kampung Datuk Keramat	Mindef Stadium	5,000
(Negeri Sembilan) Bunga Raya	Tampin	Tampin Mini Stadium	500
(Putrajaya) Immigration II	Serdang	UPM Stadium	3,000
Johor Darul Ta'zim II	Pasir Gudang	Pasir Gudang Corporation Stadium	15,000
Kedah Darul Aman	Jitra	MPKP Mini Stadium	5,000
Kedah FA	Alor Setar	Darul Aman Stadium	32,387
Kelantan Red Warrior	Kota Bharu	Sultan Muhammad IV Stadium	30,000
Kelantan WTS	Kota Bharu	Sultan Muhammad IV Stadium	30,000
(Sarawak) Machan	Melaka City	Hang Tuah Stadium	1,000
(Malaysia) Malaysian University	Nilai	USIM Stadium	1,000
(Perak) Manjung City	Seri Manjung	Manjung Municipal Council Stadium	15,000
Perak FA	Chemor	Chepor SSI Mini Stadium, Perak Football Complex	1,000
Perlis GSA	Kangar	Tuanku Syed Putra Stadium	20,000
Selangor II	Petaling Jaya	Petaling Jaya Stadium	25,000
(South Korea) Seoul Phoenix	Cyberjaya	Sepang Municipal Council Stadium	1,000
(Selangor) UM-Damansara United	Kuala Lumpur	UM Arena Stadium	1,500

=== Locations ===
Locations of teams in the 2025–26 Malaysia A1 Semi-Pro
Klang Valley

== Personnel, kits and sponsoring ==
Team	Head coach	Captain	Kit manufacturer	Kit sponsors	
Team	Head coach	Captain	Kit manufacturer	Main	Other(s)
Armed Forces	(England) Kevin Cooper	(Malaysia) Faiz Ibrahim	(Malaysia) Altr.gg	None	List: Front: Back: Sleeves: Shorts:
Bunga Raya	(Malaysia) Mohamad Ishak Bin Kunju Mohamad	(Malaysia) Fauzan Fauzi	(Malaysia) Kimicom Jersey	Bunga Raya Group of Football	List: Front: Back: Kimicom Jersey, Arena IRC Negeri Sembilan; Sleeves: Shorts:
Immigration II	(Malaysia) Azlan Ahmad	(Malaysia) Hafiz Kamal	(Malaysia) AL Sports	Weststar	List: Front: FIVE Petroleum; Back: CTIntel, Al-Ikhsan Sports; Sleeves: GoHub, Enegel; Shorts:
Johor Darul Ta'zim II	(Spain) Josep Ferré	(Malaysia) Ahmad Aysar Hadi	(United States) Nike	Toyota	List: Front: Back: Sleeves: JCORP; Shorts:
Kedah Darul Aman	(Malaysia) Azzmi Aziz	(Malaysia) Zamri Pin Ramli	(Malaysia) ALX	None	List: Front: Back: Cosmic, Anak Sena, Arab Street, Al-Ikhsan Sports; Sleeves: Shorts:
Kedah FA	(Malaysia) Victor Andrag	(Senegal) Papé Diakité	(England) Mitre	Experience Kedah	List: Front: MBI Kedah, PKNK; Back: Pancaran Matahari, CT Global; Sleeves: Shorts:
Kelantan Red Warrior	(Malaysia) Irfan Bakti Abu Salim	(Malaysia) Norshahrul Idlan	(Thailand) Warrix	Nasken Coffee	List: Front: Back Amar Amran, Ekspres Perdana; Sleeves: Shorts:
Kelantan WTS	(Malaysia) Abdul Aziz Mustapha	(Malaysia) Wan Zaharulnizam Zakaria	(Malaysia) PUC Sport	Niemans	List: Front: Mukreez Construction, WNS; Back: PUC Sport; Sleeves: Shorts:
Machan	(Malaysia) Mohd Shukri Haji Ismail	(Malaysia) Akhir Bahari	(Malaysia) Kimicom Jersey	ACE Speed	List: Front: Back: Kimicom Jersey, MediPulih Klinik, Manipal Rehabilitation Centre; Sleeves: Extra Joss; Shorts:
Malaysian University	(Malaysia) Mohd Yazli Yahya	(Malaysia) Zharif Nazhan	(Malaysia) Let's Play Performance	None	List: Front: Back: Sleeves: Shorts:
Manjung City	(Malaysia) K. Nanthakumar	(Malaysia) Syamin Baharuddin	(Malaysia) EFS	Discover Manjung	List: Front: Back: Arwana Group; Sleeves: Restoran Madinah; Shorts:
Perak FA	(Malaysia) Syamsul Saad	(Malaysia) Kamal Arif Azrai	(Malaysia) AL Sports	Perak Sejahtera 2030	List: Front: Perbadanan Setiausaha Kerajaan Negeri Perak, MB Inc.; Back: Darul Ridzuan Integrity Champion, Al-Ikhsan Sports; Sleeves: Lembaga Air Perak, Perbadanan Pertanian Negeri Perak; Shorts:
Perlis GSA	(Malaysia) Abdullah Hassan	(Malaysia) Anas Shaharom	(Malaysia) El Klasiko	Potcat Foods	List: Front: TRA Holidays; Back: El Klasiko; Sleeves: Visit Perlis; Shorts:
Selangor II	(France) Christophe Gamel	(Malaysia) Syahir Bashah	(Spain) Joma	PKNS	List: Front: Khind, AKE, MBI Selangor; Back: Daikin, SANI, World Wide Holdings; Sleeves: Sime Darby Property, MBPJ; Shorts:
Seoul Phoenix	(Malaysia) Ariff Hashim	(South Korea) Chan-yang Choi	(South Korea) ZD Sports	Hobaek Logistics	List: Front: Back: ZD Sports, Kimchi Brewery; Sleeves: Shorts:
UM-Damansara United	(Malaysia) Ridzuan Abu Shah	(Malaysia) Hariz Mansor	(Malaysia) Kovra (Malaysia) Line7	TouchTronics	List: Front: Back: Fexiebowl Langkawi, Sportflex; Sleeves: Extra Joss; Shorts:

== Foreign players ==
The number of foreign players is restricted to two per each team. Note: Flags indicate national team as has been defined under FIFA eligibility rules. Players may hold more than one non-FIFA nationality.

Team	Player 1	Player 2	Player 3	Former players^{1}
Armed Forces	(South Korea) Han-seong Lee	(South Korea) Si-won Yoo	(South Korea) Seungwon Jung	—N/a
Bunga Raya	(Mali) **Hassan Zhokwo**	(Nigeria) **Emmanuel Samson**	(Ghana) **Joseph Nii Amugi**	(Mali) Tangara Adama (Nigeria) Kingsley Obinna (South Korea) Keon-il Lee
Immigration II	(Brazil) Felipe de Lima	(Tanzania) Said Khamis	(Ivory Coast) **Michael Archange**	—N/a
Johor Darul Ta'zim II	(Colombia) Jean Franco Castillo	(Spain) Celso Bermejo	(Spain) Miguel Ángel Cuesta	—N/a
Kedah Darul Aman	—N/a	—N/a	—N/a	—N/a
Kedah FA	(Nigeria) **Chukwu Chijioke**	(Ghana) Yakubu Abubakar	(Senegal) Papé Diakité	(Nigeria) Azeez Adam
Kelantan Red Warrior	(Cameroon) Emmanuel Mbarga	(Brazil) **Wesley Barnaske**	(Nigeria) **Philip Musa**	(Kenya) Ismael Dunga (Pakistan) Otis Khan
Kelantan WTS	(Ghana) **Arbdallah Dandy**	(Ghana) **Anthony Arthur**	(Democratic Republic of the Congo) **Emmanuel Mosindo**	(Democratic Republic of the Congo) Willy Wabanga
Machan	(Algeria) **Mohamed Chemseddine Amara**	(Ghana) **Aminu Maiga**	(Algeria) **Abderrahmane Benamaraouche**	(Brazil) John Kennedy (South Korea) Jonghyun Kim (South Korea) Seungwon Jung
Malaysian University	—N/a	—N/a	—N/a	—N/a
Manjung City	(Ghana) Atiso Geli Emmanuel	(Senegal) **Jacque Faye**	(Liberia) **Ace Batener**	(Australia) Kayden Soper (Ghana) Adom Bright
Perak FA	(Nigeria) Aliyu Abubakar	(Nigeria) Mathew Idoko John	(Nigeria) Ekene Victor Emewulu	(Nigeria) Christian Chukwu
Perlis GSA	—N/a	—N/a	—N/a	—N/a
Selangor II	(France) Seif-Dine Hraoubia	—N/a	—N/a	(Thailand) Picha Autra (Afghanistan) Omid Musawi
Seoul Phoenix	(Nigeria) Precious Allwell	(Cameroon) **Ibrahim Yahaya**	(Cameroon) **Seidou Ismaila**	(Brazil) Gabriel Noronha (South Africa) Mhlengi Sibonani Ndhlovu
UM-Damansara United	(Brazil) Nicolas Vargas Valinotti	(Nigeria) Thankgod Michael	(Senegal) **Moussa Mbaye**	(The Gambia) Anuar Ceesay

- Players name in **bold** indicates that the player was registered during the mid-season transfer window.
- **^1** Foreign players who left their teams or were de-registered from the squad.

== Standings ==
=== League table ===
Pos	Team	Pld	W	D	L	GF	GA	GD	Pts	Qualification or relegation
1	Johor Darul Ta'zim II (C)	28	19	6	3	64	17	+47	63	Ineligible for promotion (Note: Parent team in Malaysia Super League / developmental team)
2	Selangor II	28	19	4	5	63	20	+43	61	Ineligible for promotion
3	Kedah FA (Note: Did not apply for a national license)	28	17	6	5	46	16	+30	57	
4	Kelantan Red Warrior (X)	28	17	5	6	64	15	+49	56	Qualified to the 2026 Malaysia Cup & promotion to the 2026–27 Malaysia Super League
5	Perak FA (Note: Did not apply for a national license) (X)	28	15	10	3	50	18	+32	55	Qualified to the 2026 Malaysia Cup
6	UM-Damansara United (X)	28	14	7	7	50	29	+21	49	Qualified to the 2026 Malaysia Cup
7	Kelantan WTS	28	13	5	10	37	40	−3	44	
8	Armed Forces	28	10	11	7	43	25	+18	41	
9	Manjung City	28	12	5	11	40	38	+2	41	
10	Immigration II	28	9	11	8	54	39	+15	38	
11	Malaysian University	28	7	5	16	36	47	−11	26	
12	Bunga Raya	28	7	2	19	21	56	−35	23	
13	Seoul Phoenix	28	5	2	21	21	101	−80	17	Withdrawn from A1 Semi-Pro League
14	Perlis GSA	28	3	6	19	23	67	−44	15	Withdrawn from A1 Semi-Pro League
15	Kedah Darul Aman (R)	28	0	1	27	9	93	−84	1	Relegation to the 2026–27 Malaysia A2 Amateur League
16	Machan	0	0	0	0	0	0	0	0	Withdrew (Note: On 4 April 2026, the AFL announced they accepted the withdrawal of Machan FC. Their points and goals were expunged.)

Updated to match(es) played on 24 May 2026. Source: AFL
Rules for classification: 1) Points; 2) Goal difference; 3) Number of goals scored.
(C) League champion; (R) Relegated; (X) Qualified to the 2026 Malaysia Cup

=== Position by round ===
Team ╲ Round	1	2	3	4	5	6	7	8	9	10	11	12	13	14	15	16	17	18	19	20	21	22	23	24	25	26	27	28	29	30
Johor Darul Ta'zim II	12	6	3	3	5	3	4	4	3	3	3	2	2	2	2	2	1	2	1	2	2	2	2	2	2	1	1	1	1	1
Selangor II	2	2	2	2	1	1	1	1	1	1	1	1	1	1	1	1	2	1	2	1	1	1	1	1	1	2	2	2	2	2
Kedah FA	9	11	13	9	7	6	7	7	4	6	4	5	5	5	5	4	4	3	6	5	5	3	3	3	3	3	3	3	3	3
Kelantan Red Warrior	11	14	15	15	10	10	11	9	9	9	9	7	7	8	7	6	3	6	5	6	6	7	7	6	6	5	4	4	4	4
Perak FA	15	12	4	5	4	5	5	2	2	2	2	3	3	3	3	5	6	5	3	3	3	4	5	5	5	4	5	5	5	5
UM-Damansara Utd	5	8	7	7	8	9	6	6	7	4	6	4	4	4	4	3	5	4	4	4	4	5	4	4	4	6	6	6	6	6
Kelantan WTS	4	3	6	6	6	4	2	5	5	8	8	9	9	9	9	9	9	9	9	9	7	6	8	8	7	7	7	7	7	7
Armed Forces	1	1	1	1	2	2	3	3	6	7	7	8	8	6	6	7	7	7	7	7	8	8	6	7	8	8	8	8	8	8
Manjung City	8	10	14	14	15	15	14	13	13	13	12	12	10	10	10	10	10	10	10	10	10	10	10	10	10	10	10	10	9	9
Immigration II	7	13	5	4	3	7	8	8	8	5	5	6	6	7	8	8	8	8	8	8	9	9	9	9	9	9	9	9	10	10
Malaysian University	14	15	11	12	11	11	13	14	14	14	14	14	14	14	14	14	14	14	14	14	13	13	12	12	12	12	12	12	11	11
Bunga Raya	16	9	10	11	12	13	10	11	12	11	11	13	13	12	12	12	11	11	11	11	11	11	11	11	11	11	11	11	12	12
Seoul Phoenix	6	4	9	8	9	8	9	10	10	10	10	10	11	13	13	13	13	13	13	13	12	12	13	14	14	14	14	14	13	13
Perlis GSA	10	5	8	10	13	12	12	12	11	12	13	11	12	11	11	11	12	12	12	12	14	14	14	13	13	13	13	13	14	14
Kedah Darul Aman	3	7	12	13	14	14	15	15	15	15	15	15	15	15	15	15	15	15	15	15	15	15	15	15	15	15	15	15	15	15

Champion & qualification for Malaysia Super League
Qualification for Malaysia Super League
Relegation to Al-Ikhsan Cup

Source: AFL

== Fixtures and results ==
=== Results table ===
Home \ Away	AFC	BGR	IFC	JDT	KDA	KED	KRW	WTS	MAC	MAU	MCT	PRK	GSA	SEL	PHO	UMD
Armed Forces		4–0	1–1	2–2	2–0	1–1	0–1	2–1	6–0	1–1	3–0	1–2	3–0	2–0	3–1	2–2
Bunga Raya	0–0		1–4	0–2	1–0	0–3	0–2	1–2	5–0	1–3	0–2	0–0	3–1	1–3	2–0	0–1
Immigration II	0–3	4–0		1–2	4–0	0–0	0–1	1–3	5–2	2–1	1–2	2–2	0–0	2–2	7–1	3–3
Johor Darul Ta'zim II	2–2	3–0	1–1		6–0	1–0	2–1	0–0	6–1	1–0	2–1	1–2	6–1	3–2	0–1	2–0
Kedah Darul Aman	0–1	1–2	0–3	0–6		1–4	0–3	1–2	1–0	0–2	0–5	0–2	2–2	0–6	1–6	1–4
Kedah FA	2–1	5–0	0–1	1–0	1–0		1–0	2–0		2–0	2–0	1–1	2–0	1–2	3–0	0–0
Kelantan Red Warrior	3–0	2–1	2–2	0–0	6–0	2–1		2–0		6–0	4–0	0–1	5–0	1–0	6–0	1–1
Kelantan WTS	1–0	1–0	2–1	2–2	2–0	0–2	0–6		3–0	1–0	1–1	0–0	3–0	1–3	2–2	1–0
Machan		1–1	0–3	1–3	0–0	0–4		0–1				0–1	0–1	0–8	1–2	0–3
Malaysian University	1–0	1–2	1–1	0–1	5–1	1–3	0–4	3–4	1–2		0–1	0–3	3–0	0–0	3–0	1–1
Manjung City	1–0	1–0	1–1	0–1	4–0	0–3	2–1	1–2	1–1	3–2		0–0	2–2	0–2	5–1	1–1
Perak FA	0–0	6–2	1–1	0–3	5–1	0–0	1–1	2–0	3–0	2–0	4–1		2–0	1–1	2–0	0–1
Perlis GSA	1–1	1–2	2–8	0–4	2–0	0–0	0–3	1–0	1–2	1–1	0–3	0–1		0–1	8–0	0–4
Selangor II	1–1	3–0	4–0	0–1	3–0	2–1	2–1	3–1		3–0	2–0	1–2	3–0		5–0	3–0
Seoul Phoenix	0–6	0–2	0–2	0–9	2–0	0–2	0–0	0–4		2–6	1–0	0–8	3–1	0–3		1–8
UM-Damansara United	1–1	1–0	3–1	0–1	2–0	2–3	1–0	4–1		1–0	2–3	1–0	2–0	1–3	3–0	

Updated to match(es) played on 24 May 2026. Source: FAM-CMS
Legend: Blue = home team win; Yellow = draw; Red = away team win.
For upcoming matches, an "a" indicates there is an article about the rivalry between the two participants.

=== Results by match played ===
Team ╲ Round	1	2	3	4	5	6	7	8	9	10	11	12	13	14	15	16	17	18	19	20	21	22	23	24	25	26	27	28	29	30
Armed Forces	W	W	W	D	W	D	D	D	L	D	L	D	W	W	W	D	D	L	W	W	D	L	W	D	D	L	L	W	–	L
Bunga Raya	L	W	D	L	L	L	W	L	L	W	D	L	L	W	L	D	W	W	L	L	L	W	L	L	W	L	L	L	L	L
Perlis GSA	D	W	L	L	L	D	D	D	D	L	D	W	L	W	L	L	L	L	L	L	L	L	L	W	L	L	L	L	L	L
Immigration II	D	L	W	W	W	L	D	W	D	W	D	D	W	D	L	L	D	W	W	W	L	L	W	L	D	W	D	D	L	D
Johor Darul Ta'zim II	L	W	W	W	L	W	D	W	W	D	W	W	W	D	W	W	W	L	W	W	W	W	W	W	D	W	W	W	D	D
Kedah Darul Aman	W	L	L	L	L	L	L	L	D	L	L	L	L	L	L	D	L	L	L	L	L	L	L	L	L	L	L	L	L	L
Kedah FA	D	D	L	W	W	W	D	W	W	L	W	L	W	D	W	W	D	W	L	W	W	W	W	W	D	W	L	–	W	W
Kelantan Red Warrior	L	D	D	L	W	D	D	W	W	L	W	W	W	D	W	W	W	L	W	W	L	L	–	W	W	W	W	W	W	W
Kelantan WTS	W	D	L	W	W	W	W	L	D	L	L	L	L	D	D	W	W	W	W	W	W	W	L	W	W	L	W	L	D	L
Malaysian University	L	L	W	L	L	D	L	L	L	L	L	D	L	L	W	L	D	W	D	L	W	L	L	L	–	L	W	D	W	W
Manjung City	D	D	L	L	D	L	D	L	L	W	W	D	W	W	L	W	L	L	W	W	L	W	D	L	L	W	–	W	W	W
Perak FA	L	D	W	W	W	D	W	W	W	W	D	D	W	D	D	L	D	W	W	L	W	W	D	D	W	W	D	W	W	W
Selangor II	W	W	W	D	W	W	D	W	W	W	W	W	L	D	W	L	D	W	L	W	W	W	W	–	W	W	W	L	L	W
Seoul Phoenix	W	D	L	W	L	W	L	L	D	L	W	L	L	L	L	L	L	L	L	L	W	L	L	L	L	–	L	L	W	L
UM-Damansara Utd	W	L	D	W	D	D	W	W	D	W	L	W	W	D	W	W	L	W	D	L	D	W	W	W	L	L	W	W	L	–
Machan	L	L	D	L	L	L	L	L	L	W	L	D	L	L	L	D	W	L	L	L	L	L	C	C	C	C	C	C	C	C

Updated to match(es) played on 24 May 2026. Source: FAM
W = Win; D = Draw; L = Lose; P = Postponed; C = Withdrawn

=== League matches ===
League Matchdays (1st Round)

=== Matchweek 1 ===
2 August 2025	Perlis GSA	0–0	Kedah FA	Kangar
20:45 UTC+8		Report		Stadium: Tuanku Syed Putra Stadium; Attendance: 4,168; Referee: Nazmi Nasaruddin

2 August 2025	Manjung City	1–1	Immigration II	Seri Manjung
20:45 UTC+8	Syamin 66'	Report	Afiq Hilman 81'	Stadium: Manjung Stadium; Attendance: 537; Referee: Mohamad Faizudin bin Ismail

3 August 2025	Kedah Darul Aman	1–0	Machan	Jitra
16:45 UTC+8	Zamri Pin Ramli 5'	Report		Stadium: MPKP Mini Stadium; Attendance: 627; Referee: Kamal Ikhwan Yaacob

3 August 2025	Armed Forces	4–0	Bunga Raya	Kuala Lumpur
16:45 UTC+8	Hadi Mohamad 29', 57'; Hairul Iqmal 75', 88'	Report		Stadium: Mindef Stadium; Attendance: 377; Referee: Razlan Joffri Ali

4 August 2025	Perak FA	0–1	UM-Damansara United	Seri Manjung
20:45 UTC+8		Report	Shafizi Iqmal 73'	Stadium: Manjung Stadium; Attendance: 364; Referee: Fusser Sallih

4 August 2025	Kelantan WTS	1–0	Malaysian University	Kota Bharu
20:45 UTC+8	Ahmad Nazri 73'	Report		Stadium: Sultan Muhammad IV Stadium; Attendance: 350; Referee: Kamil Zakaria Ismail

16 August 2025	Johor Darul Ta'zim II	0–1	Seoul Phoenix	Pasir Gudang
16:45 UTC+8		Report	Faris Danish 51' (o.g.)	Stadium: Pasir Gudang Corporation Stadium; Attendance: 730; Referee: Usaid Jamal

25 September 2025	Selangor II	2–1	Kelantan Red Warrior	Serdang
16:45 UTC+8	Rahman Daud 19'; Moses Raj 43' (pen.)	Report	Emmanuel Mbarga 45+1'	Stadium: UPM Stadium; Attendance: 232

=== Matchweek 2 ===
8 August 2025	Machan	0–1	Perlis GSA	Tampin
16:45 UTC+8		Report	Ikmal Faiz Azmi 10'	Stadium: Tampin Mini Stadium; Attendance: 50; Referee: Hafizi Mohamad Nor Hazalin

8 August 2025	Immigration II	0–3	Armed Forces	Serdang
20:45 UTC+8		Report	Rafizol 47'; Hadi Mohamad 47'; Naaim Firdaus 27' (o.g.)	Stadium: UPM Stadium; Attendance: 250; Referee: Ridzuan Husni

9 August 2025	Selangor II	3–0	Malaysian University	Selayang
16:45 UTC+8	Abdul Rahman 8'; Omid Musawi 10'; Danish Iskandar 36'	Report		Stadium: Selayang Municipal Council Stadium; Attendance: 120; Referee: Jubik Andangon

9 August 2025	Perak FA	0–0	Kedah FA	Seri Manjung
20:45 UTC+8		Report		Stadium: Manjung Municipal Council Stadium; Attendance: 605; Referee: Anselm Anak Enterang

10 August 2025	UM-Damansara United	0–1	Johor Darul Ta'zim II	Kuala Lumpur
16:45 UTC+8		Report	Alif Mutalib 80'	Stadium: UM Arena Stadium; Attendance: 1,334; Referee: Muhammad Faizal Talib

10 August 2025	Bunga Raya	1–0	Kedah Darul Aman	Paroi
16:45 UTC+8	Thrishen Ramesh 81'	Report		Stadium: Tuanku Abdul Rahman Stadium; Attendance: 174; Referee: Muhammad Latiffi Zahrom

11 August 2025	Kelantan WTS	1–1	Manjung City	Kota Bharu
20:45 UTC+8	Nazri Muhammad 75'	Report	Amreel Iqbal 23'	Stadium: Sultan Muhammad IV Stadium; Attendance: 350; Referee: Azizul Ismail

6 September 2025	Seoul Phoenix	0–0	Kelantan Red Warrior	Kota Bharu
20:45 UTC+8		Report		Stadium: Sultan Muhammad IV Stadium; Attendance: 1,500; Referee: Azizul Ismail

=== Matchweek 3 ===
17 August 2025	Armed Forces	2–1	Kelantan WTS	Kampung Datuk Keramat
16:45 UTC+8	Hadi Mohamad 25', 32'	Report	Aqil Hilman 70'	Stadium: Mindef Stadium; Attendance: 820; Referee: Muhammad Harris Shahruddin

22 August 2025	Machan	1–1	Bunga Raya	Tampin
16:45 UTC+8	Jonghyun 86'	Report	Ilham Syukri 15'	Stadium: Tampin Mini Stadium; Attendance: 102; Referee: Mohd Shahrizan Solihim

22 August 2025	Perak FA	2–0	Perlis GSA	Chemor
16:45 UTC+8	Chukwu 1'; Kamal Arif 78'	Report		Stadium: Chepor SSI Mini Stadium, Perak Football Complex; Attendance: 340; Referee: Ridzuan Husni

22 August 2025	Kelantan Red Warrior	1–1	UM-Damansara United	Kota Bharu
20:45 UTC+8	Arham Khussyairi 87'	Report	Syahir Abd Rahman 32'	Stadium: Sultan Muhammad IV Stadium; Attendance: 2,500; Referee: Mohd Faisal Ridzuan

23 August 2025	Kedah Darul Aman	0–3	Immigration II	Jitra
16:45 UTC+8		Report	Said Khamis 45+2'; Hafiz Kamal 55'; Norzaiful Zaizurin 63'	Stadium: MPKP Mini Stadium; Attendance: 534; Referee: Kamal Ikhwan Bin Yaacob

24 August 2025	Malaysian University	3–0	Seoul Phoenix	Kajang
16:45 UTC+8	Issma Daniel Hamka 1', 12'; Zharif Nazhan Refli 71'	Report		Stadium: INSPEN Stadium; Attendance: 317; Referee: Mursyid bin Baharom

17 October 2025	Manjung City	0–2	Selangor II	Seri Manjung
20:45 UTC+8		Report	Abd Rahman 1', 19'	Stadium: Manjung Municipal Council Stadium

18 October 2025	Johor Darul Ta'zim II	1–0	Kedah FA	Pasir Gudang
20:45 UTC+8	Danish Hakimi 2'	Report		Stadium: Pasir Gudang Corporation Stadium

=== Matchweek 4 ===
29 August 2025	UM-Damansara United	1–0	Malaysian University	Kuala Lumpur
16:45 UTC+8	Thankgod Michael 32'	Report		Stadium: UM Arena Stadium; Attendance: 200; Referee: Jubik Andangon

6 September 2025	Immigration II	4–0	Bunga Raya	Bangi, Selangor
16:45 UTC+8	Said Khamis 4'; Hafiz Kamal 23'; Furqan Azri 39'; Hazim Abu Zaid 90+4'	Report		Stadium: UKM Bangi Stadium; Attendance: 290; Referee: Zam Azwan Khan Bin Rashid Khan

12 September 2025	Kedah Darul Aman	1–2	Kelantan WTS	Jitra
16:45 UTC+8	Shahrul Hakimi 51' (pen.)	Report	Aqil Hilman 20'; Hazrie Zulhadi 68' (o.g.)	Stadium: MPKP Mini Stadium; Attendance: 216; Referee: Kamal Ikhwan bin Yaacob

13 September 2025	Perak FA	3–0	Machan	Chemor
16:45 UTC+8	Daniel Hakimi 20', 37'; Amirul Akmal 89'	Report		Stadium: Chepor SSI Mini Stadium, Perak Football Complex; Attendance: 345; Referee: Mohd Hafizuan Mohd Khair

13 September 2025	Seoul Phoenix	1–0	Manjung City	Sepang
16:45 UTC+8	Youngju Song 22'	Report		Stadium: Sepang Municipal Council Stadium; Attendance: 216; Referee: Muhammad Latiffi Zahrom

13 September 2025	Kedah FA	1–0	Kelantan Red Warrior	Alor Setar
20:45 UTC+8	Nabil Latpi 79'	Report		Stadium: Darul Aman Stadium; Attendance: 550; Referee: Hemanathan a/l Subermaniam

14 September 2025	Selangor II	1–1	Armed Forces	Serdang
16:45 UTC+8	Khalil 1'	Report	Marcus Mah 8'	Stadium: UPM Stadium; Attendance: 236; Referee: Muhammad Nasaruddin bin Muhammad Tamrin

15 September 2025	Perlis GSA	0–4	Johor Darul Ta'zim II	Kangar
20:45 UTC+8		Report	Syukur Januri 9'; Ziad El Basheer 17'; Franco Granja 32'; Shafizan Arshad 58'	Stadium: Tuanku Syed Putra Stadium; Attendance: 4,799; Referee: Mohd Afdzal Hilmi Bin Zulkiflee

=== Matchweek 5 ===
19 September 2025	Machan	0–3	Immigration II	Tampin
16:45 UTC+8		Report	Naaim Firdaus 10'; Hafiz Kamal 39'; Said Khamis 47'	Stadium: Tampin Mini Stadium; Attendance: 70; Referee: Mohd Izham Abdullah

20 September 2025	Bunga Raya	1–2	Kelantan WTS	Paroi
16:45 UTC+8	S. Veenod 78' (pen.)	Report	Nazmi Haikal 28'; Amirul Shafik 80'	Stadium: Tuanku Abdul Rahman Stadium; Attendance: 80; Referee: Mohamad Sofi Romli

20 September 2025	Malaysian University	1–3	Kedah FA	Cyberjaya
16:45 UTC+8	Aiman Danial 64' (pen.)	Report	Aiman Hafiz 15'; Azeez Adam 31', 66' (pen.)	Stadium: MMU Stadium; Attendance: 216; Referee: Muhammad Faiz Mohamad Dali

20 September 2025	Johor Darul Ta'zim II	1–2	Perak FA	Pasir Gudang
20:45 UTC+8	Jose Bermejo 38'	Report	Rafiq Al-Amzar 32'; Fadhil Azmi 47'	Stadium: Pasir Gudang Corporation Stadium; Attendance: 418; Referee: Mohamad Haziq Iqmal Ayazi

21 September 2025	Armed Forces	3–1	Seoul Phoenix	Kuala Lumpur
16:45 UTC+8	Rafael Shahzari 31'; Hadi Mohamad 45+1'; Faiz Ibrahim 51'	Report	Sang Uk Oh 74'	Stadium: Mindef Stadium; Attendance: 364

21 September 2025	Kedah Darul Aman	0–6	Selangor II	Jitra
16:45 UTC+8		Report	Fakhri Azri 16'; Nabil Qayyum 18', 64'; Abdul Rahman 45'; Zamirul Hakim 83'; Zharif Zaini 89'	Stadium: MPKP Mini Stadium; Attendance: 142

22 September 2025	Manjung City	1–1	UM-Damansara United	Seri Manjung
20:45 UTC+8	Muslihuddin 'Atiq 45+1'	Report	Thankgod Michael 3'	Stadium: Manjung Municipal Council Stadium; Attendance: 226

18 October 2025	Kelantan Red Warrior	5–0	Perlis GSA	Kota Bharu
20:45 UTC+8	Fazli Ghazali 1'; Zuasyraf 5'; Emmanuel Mbarga 27', 66'; Latiff Suhaimi 45+1'	Report		Stadium: Sultan Muhammad IV Stadium

=== Matchweek 6 ===
26 September 2025	Johor Darul Ta'zim II	6–1	Machan	Pasir Gudang
20:45 UTC+8	Miquel Angel 8', 79'; Danish Hakimi 38'; Daryl Sham 48'; Franco Granja 82'; Celso Bermejo 88'	Report	Amirul Husaini 68'	Stadium: Pasir Gudang Corporation Stadium; Attendance: 366

27 September 2025	Perlis GSA	1–1	Malaysian University	Arau
16:45 UTC+8	Akmal Afizan 22'	Report	Nashran Elias 34'	Stadium: UiTM Perlis Sports Complex; Attendance: 220

27 September 2025	Immigration II	1–3	Kelantan WTS	Serdang
16:45 UTC+8	Said Khamis 90+4'	Report	Aqil Hilman 37', 60'; Aiman Yusuf 65'	Stadium: UPM Stadium; Attendance: 423

27 September 2025	UM-Damansara United	1–1	Armed Forces	Kuala Lumpur
16:45 UTC+8	Syahir Abdul Rahman 67'	Report	Marcus Mah 8'	Stadium: UM Arena Stadium; Attendance: 113

27 September 2025	Kedah FA	2–0	Manjung City	Alor Setar
20:45 UTC+8	Rahmat Makasuf 14', 30'	Report		Stadium: Darul Aman Stadium; Attendance: 635

28 September 2025	Seoul Phoenix	2–0	Kedah Darul Aman	Kuala Lumpur
16:45 UTC+8	Chanyang Choi 45', 58'	Report		Stadium: UM Arena Stadium; Attendance: 167

28 September 2025	Selangor II	3–0	Bunga Raya	Petaling Jaya
16:45 UTC+8	Abdul Rahman 68', 70'; Nabil Qayyum 90'	Report		Stadium: Petaling Jaya Stadium; Attendance: 165

29 September 2025	Perak FA	1–1	Kelantan Red Warrior	Chemor
16:45 UTC+8	Christian Okwudiri 70' (pen.)	Report	Emmanuel Mbarga 16' (pen.)	Stadium: Chepor SSI Mini Stadium, Perak Football Complex; Attendance: 436

=== Matchweek 7 ===
3 October 2025	Machan	0–1	Kelantan WTS	Tampin
16:45 UTC+8		Report	90+15' (pen.) Aiman Yusuf	Stadium: Tampin Mini Stadium; Attendance: 107; Referee: Mohamad Sofi Romli

3 October 2025	Immigration II	2–2	Selangor II	Serdang
20:45 UTC+8	Nadzwin Salleh 17'; Said Khamis 25'	Report	23' Nabil Qayyum; 80' Aliff Izwan	Stadium: UPM Stadium; Attendance: 200

4 October 2025	Manjung City	2–2	Perlis GSA	Seri Manjung
20:45 UTC+8	Saifuddin 70', 89'	Report	7' Hazwan Hassan; 31' Amr Haziq Haikal	Stadium: Manjung Municipal Council Stadium; Attendance: 228

5 October 2025	Malaysian University	0–3	Perak FA	Cyberjaya
16:45 UTC+8		Report		Stadium: MMU Stadium

5 October 2025	Armed Forces	1–1	Kedah FA	Kuala Lumpur
16:45 UTC+8	Faiz Ibrahim 11'	Report	Rahmat Makasuf 27'	Stadium: Mindef Stadium; Attendance: 800

6 October 2025	Bunga Raya	2–0	Seoul Phoenix	Tampin
16:45 UTC+8	Aqil Hazwan 1'; Azfar Sallehudin 75'	Report		Stadium: Tampin Mini Stadium

6 October 2025	Kedah Darul Aman	1–4	UM-Damansara United	Jitra
16:45 UTC+8	Iqmal Hazim 64'	Report	Shafizi Iqmal 46', 64'; Thankgod Michael 47'; Iman Hakimi 79'	Stadium: MPKP Mini Stadium

6 October 2025	Kelantan Red Warrior	0–0	Johor Darul Ta'zim II	Kota Bharu
20:45 UTC+8		Report		Stadium: Sultan Muhammad IV Stadium

=== Matchweek 8 ===
10 October 2025	Kelantan Red Warrior	4–0	Machan	Kota Bharu
20:45 UTC+8		Report		Stadium: Sultan Muhammad IV Stadium

11 October 2025	Kedah FA	1–0	Kedah Darul Aman	Alor Setar
20:45 UTC+8		Report		Stadium: Darul Aman Stadium

12 October 2025	Perlis GSA	1–1	Armed Forces	Arau
20:45 UTC+8		Report		Stadium: UiTM Sports Complex

12 October 2025	Perak FA	4–1	Manjung City	Chemor
16:45 UTC+8		Report		Stadium: Chepor SSI Mini Stadium, Perak Football Complex

12 October 2025	Seoul Phoenix	0–2	Immigration II	Sepang
16:45 UTC+8		Report		Stadium: Sepang Municipal Council Stadium

12 October 2025	Johor Darul Ta'zim II	1–0	Malaysian University	Pasir Gudang
20:45 UTC+8	Franco Casquete 17'	Report		Stadium: Pasir Gudang Corporation Stadium

13 October 2025	UM-Damansara United	1–0	Bunga Raya	Kuala Lumpur
16:45 UTC+8		Report		Stadium: UM Arena Stadium

13 October 2025	Selangor II	3–1	Kelantan WTS	Selayang
16:45 UTC+8		Report		Stadium: Selayang Stadium

=== Matchweek 9 ===
24 October 2025	Machan	0–8	Selangor II	Tampin
16:45 UTC+8		Report	14', 60', 90+3' Nabil Qayyum; 70', 76' Rohisham Haiqal; 71', 74', 90' Abdul Rahman Daud	Stadium: Tampin Mini Stadium

25 October 2025	Kedah Darul Aman	2–2	Perlis GSA	Jitra
16:45 UTC+8	Shahrul Hakimi 64'; Sharul Aiman 74'	Report	39' Hazwan Hassan; 68' Arif Nadzman	Stadium: MPKP Mini Stadium

25 October 2025	Armed Forces	1–2	Perak FA	Kuala Lumpur
16:45 UTC+8		Report		Stadium: Mindef Stadium

25 October 2025	Immigration II	3–3	UM-Damansara United	Bangi
16:45 UTC+8		Report		Stadium: UKM Bangi Stadium

25 October 2025	Kelantan WTS	2–2	Seoul Phoenix	Kota Bharu
20:45 UTC+8		Report		Stadium: Sultan Muhammad IV Stadium

26 October 2025	Malaysian University	0–4	Kelantan Red Warrior	Cyberjaya
16:45 UTC+8		Report	69' Rizuan Muda; 82', 90+2' Emmanuel Mbarga; 90+7' Mazwan Che Mat	Stadium: MMU Stadium

27 October 2025	Bunga Raya	0–3	Kedah FA	Tampin
16:45 UTC+8		Report		Stadium: Tampin Mini Stadium

27 October 2025	Manjung City	0–1	Johor Darul Ta'zim II	Seri Manjung
20:45 UTC+8		Report		Stadium: Manjung Municipal Council Stadium

=== Matchweek 10 ===
31 October 2025	UM-Damansara United	4–1	Kelantan WTS	Kuala Lumpur
16:45 UTC+8		Report		Stadium: UM Arena Stadium

1 November 2025	Manjung City	2–1	Kelantan Red Warrior	Seri Manjung
20:45 UTC+8		Report		Stadium: Manjung Municipal Council Stadium

1 November 2025	Kedah FA	0–1	Immigration II	Alor Setar
20:45 UTC+8		Report		Stadium: Darul Aman Stadium

1 November 2025	Johor Darul Ta'zim II	2–2	Armed Forces	Pasir Gudang
20:45 UTC+8		Report		Stadium: Pasir Gudang Corporation Stadium

2 November 2025	Seoul Phoenix	0–3	Selangor II	Sepang
16:45 UTC+8		Report		Stadium: Sepang Municipal Council Stadium

2 November 2025	Malaysian University	1–2	Machan	Seri Kembangan
16:45 UTC+8		Report		Stadium: UPM Stadium

2 November 2025	Perlis GSA	1–2	Bunga Raya	Arau
16:45 UTC+8		Report		Stadium: UiTM Perlis Sports Complex

3 November 2025	Perak FA	5–1	Kedah Darul Aman	Chemor
16:45 UTC+8	Kamal Arif 23'; Daniel Hakimi 34'; Alif Zikri 35'; Ekene Victor 45+4', 90+2'	Report	47' Iqmal Hazim	Stadium: Chepor SSI Mini Stadium, Perak Football Complex

=== Matchweek 11 ===
7 November 2025	Machan	1–2	Seoul Phoenix	Melaka City
16:45 UTC+8	Faizal Talib 47'	Report	Pyeongan Park 12'; Adam Ilmam 90+3'	Stadium: Hang Tuah Stadium

7 November 2025	Bunga Raya	0–0	Perak FA	Tampin
16:45 UTC+8		Report		Stadium: Tampin Mini Stadium

7 November 2025	Kelantan WTS	0–2	Kedah FA	Kota Bharu
20:45 UTC+8		Report	Isa Raman 3'; Barathkumar 89'	Stadium: Sultan Muhammad IV Stadium

8 November 2025	Selangor II	3–0	UM-Damansara United	Kuala Lumpur
16:45 UTC+8	Abdul Rahman Daud 12', 80'; Rohisham Haiqal 45+3'	Report		Stadium: UM Arena Stadium

8 November 2025	Kedah Darul Aman	0–6	Johor Darul Ta'zim II	Jitra
16:45 UTC+8		Report	Syukur Fariz 4', 37'; Aysar Hadi 20'; Danish Syamer 25' (pen.); Ziad El Basheer 45'; Daryl Sham 90+4'	Stadium: MPKP Mini Stadium

8 November 2025	Armed Forces	0–1	Kelantan Red Warrior	Kuala Lumpur
16:45 UTC+8		Report	Emmanuel Mbarga 20' (pen.)	Stadium: Mindef Stadium

9 November 2025	Manjung City	3–2	Malaysian University	Seri Manjung
20:45 UTC+8	Al-Azim Asri 9'; Saifuddin 59'; Harith Bisyari 80' (o.g.)	Report	Aiman Danial 10'; Adim Muzahhir 61'	Stadium: Manjung Municipal Council Stadium

10 November 2025	Immigration II	0–0	Perlis GSA	Serdang
16:45 UTC+8				Stadium: UPM Stadium

=== Matchweek 12 ===
14 November 2025	Perak FA	1–1	Immigration II	Chemor
16:45 UTC+8				Stadium: Chepor SSI Mini Stadium, Perak Football Complex

14 November 2025	Armed Forces	1–1	Malaysian University	Kuala Lumpur
16:45 UTC+8				Stadium: Mindef Stadium

14 November 2025	Kedah FA	1–2	Selangor II	Alor Setar
16:45 UTC+8				Stadium: Darul Aman Stadium

14 November 2025	Johor Darul Ta'zim II	3–0	Bunga Raya	Pasir Gudang
20:45 UTC+8		Report		Stadium: Pasir Gudang Corporation Stadium

15 November 2025	Perlis GSA	1–0	Kelantan WTS	Arau
16:45 UTC+8				Stadium: UiTM Perlis Sports Complex

17 November 2025	Kelantan Red Warrior	6–0	Kedah Darul Aman	Kota Bharu
20:45 UTC+8	Syafiq Izzudin 5', 77'; Emmanuel Mbarga 10', 41'; Fazli Ghazali 36'; Zuasyraf Zulkiefle 48'	Report		Stadium: Sultan Muhammad IV Stadium

19 November 2025	Manjung City	1–1	Machan	Seri Manjung
20:45 UTC+8				Stadium: Manjung Municipal Council Stadium

6 December 2025	UM-Damansara United	3–0	Seoul Phoenix	Kuala Lumpur
16:45 UTC+8		Report		Stadium: UM Arena Stadium

=== Matchweek 13 ===
26 November 2025	Machan	0–4	Kedah FA	Melaka City
16:45 UTC+8		Report	Aiman Afif 8', 24', 45+1'; Papé Diakité 26'	Stadium: Hang Tuah Stadium

28 November 2025	Kelantan WTS	0–6	Kelantan Red Warrior	Kota Bharu
20:45 UTC+8		Report	Emmanuel Mbarga 3', 59'; Fazli Ghazali 11'; Iskandar Shah 18'; Faiz Nasir 45+2'; Mazwan 68'	Stadium: Sultan Muhammad IV Stadium

29 November 2025	Immigration II	2–1	Malaysian University	Serdang
20:45 UTC+8	Said Khamis 22' (pen.); Norzaiful Zaizurin 51'	Report	Arif Imran 53'	Stadium: UPM Stadium

1 December 2025	Manjung City	1–0	Bunga Raya	Seri Manjung
20:45 UTC+8	Bright Adom 45+3'	Report		Stadium: Manjung Municipal Council Stadium

4 December 2025	Armed Forces	2–0	Kedah Darul Aman	Kuala Lumpur
16:45 UTC+8	Hansung Lee 15', 83'	Report		Stadium: MINDEF Stadium

14 December 2025	UM-Damansara United	2–0	Perlis GSA	Kuala Lumpur
16:45 UTC+8	Shivan Pillay 16'; Shafizi Iqmal 89'	Report		Stadium: UM Arena Stadium

14 December 2025	Seoul Phoenix	0–8	Perak FA	Chemor
16:45 UTC+8		Report	Akmal Hazim 23'; Fadhil Idris 26'; Alif Zikri 34'; Fadhil Azmi 38'; Ekene Victor 68', 72'; Iffat Fahmi 86'; Tamotehran 89'	Stadium: Chepor SSI Mini Stadium, Perak Football Complex

5 January 2026	Selangor II	0–1	Johor Darul Ta'zim II	Sepang
16:45 UTC+8		Report	Alif Ahmad 48'	Stadium: Sepang Municipal Council Stadium

=== Matchweek 14 ===
19 December 2025	Armed Forces	6–0	Machan	Kuala Lumpur
16:45 UTC+8	Zafri Zakaria 19', 23' (pen.); Hadi Mohamad 20'; Fikri Shah 42', 49'; Azim Nadim 88'	Report		Stadium: Mindef Stadium

19 December 2025	Manjung City	4–0	Kedah Darul Aman	Seri Manjung
20:45 UTC+8	Syamin 29' (pen.), 32', 53'; Muslihuddin 'Atiq 68'	Report		Stadium: Manjung Municipal Council Stadium

20 December 2025	Malaysian University	1–2	Bunga Raya	Serdang, Selangor
16:45 UTC+8	Zharif Nazhan 19'	Report	Aqil Hazwan 38'; Hassan Zhokwo 89'	Stadium: UPM Stadium

20 December 2025	Perlis GSA	8–0	Seoul Phoenix	Arau
16:45 UTC+8	Akmal Afizan 14'; Faizal Kadir 52', 66', 86'; Azannis Adzri 56'; Ikmal Faiz 19', 90+3'; Azrizan Ahmad 79'	Report		Stadium: UiTM Sports Complex

20 December 2025	Kedah FA	0–0	UM-Damansara United	Alor Setar
20:45 UTC+8		Report		Stadium: Darul Aman Stadium

20 December 2025	Kelantan Red Warrior	2–2	Immigration II	Kota Bharu
20:45 UTC+8	Fazli Ghazali 20'; Emmanuel Mbarga 26'	Report	Hazim Abu Zaid 28'; Afiq Hilman 69'	Stadium: Sultan Muhammad IV Stadium

21 December 2025	Johor Darul Ta'zim II	0–0	Kelantan WTS	Pasir Gudang
20:45 UTC+8		Report		Stadium: Pasir Gudang Corporation Stadium

22 December 2025	Perak FA	1–1	Selangor II	Chemor
16:45 UTC+8	Royizzat Daud 90+3'	Report	Izzat Syahir 55'	Stadium: Chepor SSI Mini Stadium, Perak Football Complex

=== Matchweek 15 ===
7 December 2025	Armed Forces	3–0	Manjung City	Kuala Lumpur
16:45 UTC+8	Rafizol Roslan 12', 90+5'; Faiz Ibrahim 56'	Report		Stadium: Mindef Stadium

25 December 2025	Machan	0–3	UM-Damansara United	Melaka City
16:45 UTC+8		Report	Shafizi Iqmal 51', 54', 70'	Stadium: Hang Tuah Stadium

26 December 2025	Kedah Darul Aman	0–2	Malaysian University	Jitra
16:45 UTC+8		Report	Haikal Haziq 54'; Taufik Lukman 67'	Stadium: MPKP Mini Stadium

26 December 2025	Kelantan WTS	0–0	Perak FA	Kota Bharu
20:45 UTC+8		Report		Stadium: Sultan Muhammad IV Stadium

27 December 2025	Immigration II	1–2	Johor Darul Ta'zim II	Serdang
16:45 UTC+8	Michael Achange 34'	Report	Celso Bermejo 23'; Alif Ahmad 77'	Stadium: UPM Stadium

28 December 2025	Seoul Phoenix	0–2	Kedah FA	Sepang
16:45 UTC+8		Report	Rahmat Makasuf; Nabil Latpi	Stadium: Sepang Municipal Council Stadium

29 December 2025	Selangor II	3–0	Perlis GSA	Sepang
16:45 UTC+8	Abdul Rahman Daud 37', 45+2'; Rohisham Haiqal 90+3'	Report		Stadium: Sepang Municipal Council Stadium

30 December 2025	Bunga Raya	0–2	Kelantan Red Warrior	Tampin
16:45 UTC+8				Stadium: Tampin Mini Stadium

League Matchdays (2nd Round)

=== Matchweek 16 ===
9 January 2026	Machan	0–0	Kedah Darul Aman	Melaka City
16:45 UTC+8				Stadium: Hang Tuah Stadium

9 January 2026	Bunga Raya	0–0	Armed Forces	Tampin
16:45 UTC+8				Stadium: Tampin Mini Stadium

9 January 2026	Malaysian University	3–4	Kelantan WTS	Serdang
16:45 UTC+8	Arif Imran 15'; Zikry Hafis 60'; Adim Muzahhir 65'	Report	Aiman Danial 13' (o.g.); Nazri Ahmad 21'; Emmanuel Mosindo 62'; Aqil Hilman 73' (pen.)	Stadium: UPM Stadium

10 January 2026	Kedah FA	2–0	Perlis GSA	Alor Setar
20:45 UTC+8	Afeeq Iqmal 40'; Aiman Farhan 45'	Report		Stadium: Darul Aman Stadium

11 January 2026	Immigration II	1–2	Manjung City	Serdang
16:45 UTC+8	Hazim Abu Zaid 53'	Report	Syamin Baharuddin 36', 38'	Stadium: UPM Stadium

11 January 2026	UM-Damansara United	1–0	Perak FA	Kuala Lumpur
16:45 UTC+8	Shafizi Iqmal 57'	Report		Stadium: UM Arena Stadium

11 January 2026	Seoul Phoenix	0–9	Johor Darul Ta'zim II	Sepang
16:45 UTC+8		Report	Celso Bermejo 5', 39', 79'; Danish Syamer 11', 28'; Miquel Cuesta 15'; Rafiefikri Rosman 32'; Adam Farhan 77'; Danish Zahir. 89'	Stadium: Sepang Municipal Council Stadium

12 January 2026	Kelantan Red Warrior	1–0	Selangor II	Kota Bharu
20:45 UTC+8	Emmanuel Mbarga 90+4'	Report		Stadium: Sultan Muhammad IV Stadium

=== Matchweek 17 ===
16 January 2026	Kedah Darul Aman	1–2	Bunga Raya	Jitra
16:45 UTC+8	Afif Daniel 61' (pen.)	Report	Hassan Zhokwo 41'; Ilham Syukr 90+2'	Stadium: MPKP Mini Stadium

16 January 2026	Perlis GSA	1–2	Machan	Arau
16:45 UTC+8	Arif Nazdman 32'	Report	Chemseddine Amara 87'; Aminu Maiga 90+2'	Stadium: UiTM Arau Sports Complex

17 January 2026	Armed Forces	1–1	Immigration II	Kuala Lumpur
16:45 UTC+8	Fikri Shah 21' (pen.)	Report	Said Khamis 53' (pen.)	Stadium: Mindef Stadium

17 January 2026	Manjung City	1–2	Kelantan WTS	Seri Manjung
20:45 UTC+8	Ace Batener 55'	Report	Anthony Arthur 25', 90'	Stadium: Manjung Municipal Council Stadium

18 January 2026	Malaysian University	0–0	Selangor II	Serdang
16:45 UTC+8		Report		Stadium: UPM Stadium

20 January 2026	Kelantan Red Warrior	6–0	Seoul Phoenix	Kota Bharu
20:45 UTC+8	Fazli Ghazali 38'; Emmanuel Mbarga 45', 54', 76'; Zuasyraf Zulkiefle 51'; Nik Azli 69'	Report		Stadium: Sultan Muhammad IV Stadium

21 January 2026	Kedah FA	1–1	Perak FA	Alor Setar
20:45 UTC+8	Aiman Afif 63'	Report	Victor Azike Ekene 54'	Stadium: Darul Aman Stadium

22 February 2026	Johor Darul Ta'zim II	2–0	UM-Damansara United	Pasir Gudang
22:00 UTC+8	Celso Bermejo 6'; Daryl Sham 85'	Report		Stadium: Pasir Gudang Corporation Stadium

=== Matchweek 18 ===
21 January 2026	Bunga Raya	5–0	Machan	Tampin
16:45 UTC+8	S. Vimal Nair 44', 62'; Aqil Hazwan 74'; Azarul Nazarith 82'; Saranraj Kala Arasu 89'	Report		Stadium: Tampin Mini Stadium

24 January 2026	Immigration II	4–0	Kedah Darul Aman	Serdang
16:45 UTC+8	Hazim Abu Zaid 31'; Nasriq Baharom 51'; Said Khamis 54'; Michael Archangel 62'	Report		Stadium: UPM Stadium

24 January 2026	Seoul Phoenix	2–6	Malaysian University	Sepang
16:45 UTC+8	Afiq Haikal 53'; Seidu Ismaila 90+1'	Report	Airil Mifzal 34'; Aiman Danial 42', 50'; Zikry Hafis 71'; Arif Imran 80'; Zharif Nazhan 89'	Stadium: Sepang Municipal Council Stadium

24 January 2026	Kelantan WTS	1–0	Armed Forces	Kota Bharu
20:45 UTC+8	Amjad Huzeny 87'	Report		Stadium: Sultan Muhammad IV Stadium

25 January 2026	Selangor II	2–0	Manjung City	Nilai
16:45 UTC+8	Harry Danish 1', 27'	Report		Stadium: USIM Stadium

26 January 2026	Kedah FA	1–0	Johor Darul Ta'zim II	Alor Setar
20:45 UTC+8	Rahmat Makasuf 17'	Report	Danish Syamer (red card) 90+2'	Stadium: Darul Aman Stadium; Referee: Kamal Ikhwan Yaacob

3 February 2026	UM-Damansara United	1–0	Kelantan Red Warrior	Kuala Lumpur
16:45 UTC+8	Shafizi Iqmal 49'	Report		Stadium: UM Arena Stadium

10 February 2026	Perlis GSA	0–1	Perak FA	Kangar
20:45 UTC+8		Report	Wan Zack Haikal 77'	Stadium: Tuanku Syed Putra Stadium

=== Matchweek 19 ===
30 January 2026	Machan	0–1	Perak FA	Melaka City
16:45 UTC+8		Report	Ekene 9'	Stadium: Hang Tuah Stadium

30 January 2026	Bunga Raya	1–4	Immigration II	Tampin
16:45 UTC+8	Emmanuel Samson 11'	Report	Said Khamis 45+2', 52'; T Mohd Norzaiful 53'; Alif Romli 77'	Stadium: Tampin Mini Stadium

30 January 2026	Malaysian University	1–1	UM-Damansara United	Nilai
16:45 UTC+8	Haziq Deli 58'	Report	Shivan Pillay 45+2'	Stadium: USIM Stadium

30 January 2026	Armed Forces	2–0	Selangor II	Kuala Lumpur
16:45 UTC+8	Rafael 61'; Hadi Mohamad 90+5'	Report		Stadium: Mindef Stadium

30 January 2026	Manjung City	5–1	Seoul Phoenix	Seri Manjung
20:45 UTC+8	Ace Batener 3', 8'; Jacque Faye 13'; Aiman Adha 53'; Hasnul Nur Hakim 86' (pen.)	Report	Youngju Song 29'	Stadium: Manjung Municipal Council Stadium

30 January 2026	Kelantan Red Warrior	2–1	Kedah FA	Kota Bharu
20:45 UTC+8	Emmanuel Mbarga 61'; Faiz Nasir 69'	Report	Jasmir Mehat 58'	Stadium: Sultan Muhammad IV Stadium

1 February 2026	Kelantan WTS	2–0	Kedah Darul Aman	Kota Bharu
20:45 UTC+8	Aqil Hilman 10'; Emmanuel Mosindo 90+4'	Report		Stadium: Sultan Muhammad IV Stadium

2 February 2026	Johor Darul Ta'zim II	6–1	Perlis GSA	Pasir Gudang
20:45 UTC+8	Celso Bermejo 4' (pen.), 50', 68' (pen.), 86'; Miquel Cuesta 32'; Alif Mutalib 55'	Report	Shukor Azmi 71' (pen.)	Stadium: Pasir Gudang Corporation Stadium

=== Matchweek 20 ===
6 February 2026	Kedah FA	2–1	Malaysian University	Alor Setar
20:45 UTC+8				Stadium: Darul Aman Stadium

6 February 2026	Kelantan WTS	1–0	Bunga Raya	Kota Bharu
20:45 UTC+8				Stadium: Sultan Muhammad IV Stadium

7 February 2026	Immigration II	5–2	Machan	Serdang
16:45 UTC+8	Said Khamis 7', 43' (pen.); Nasriq 49'; Norzaiful Zaizurin 59'; Furqan Azri 70'	Report	Za'im Hakim 47'; Aminu Maiga 90'	Stadium: UPM Stadium

7 February 2026	Seoul Phoenix	0–6	Armed Forces	Sepang
16:45 UTC+8		Report	Marcus Mah 45+1'; Hairul Iqmal 48', 52', 54'; Si-won Yoo 65'; Shahrul Aznei 89'	Stadium: Sepang Municipal Council Stadium

9 February 2026	Selangor II	3–0	Kedah Darul Aman	Sepang
16:45 UTC+8	Abdul Rahman Daud 37', 75' (pen.); Rohisham Haiqal 57'	Report		Stadium: Sepang Municipal Council Stadium

17 February 2026	Perlis GSA	0–3	Kelantan Red Warrior	Kangar
20:45 UTC+8		Report	Rizuan Muda 45'; Aikal Daniel 85'; Emmanuel Mbarga 90+2'	Stadium: Tuanku Syed Putra Stadium

1 April 2026	UM-Damansara United	2–3	Manjung City	Kuala Lumpur
16:45 UTC+8				Stadium: UM Arena Stadium

28 April 2026	Perak FA	0–3	Johor Darul Ta'zim II	Chemor
16:45 UTC+8				Stadium: Chepor SSI Mini Stadium, Perak Football Complex

=== Matchweek 21 ===
10 February 2026	Armed Forces	2–2	UM-Damansara United	Kuala Lumpur
16:45 UTC+8	Hairul Iqmal 22'; Zafri Zakaria 65'	Report	Wan Kuzri 26', 90+3'	Stadium: Mindef Stadium

13 February 2026	Machan	1–3	Johor Darul Ta'zim II	Melaka City
16:45 UTC+8	Aminu Maiga 43'	Report	Danish Irham 24'; Danish Syamer 36'; Celso 63' (pen.)	Stadium: Hang Tuah Stadium

13 February 2026	Bunga Raya	1–3	Selangor II	Tampin
16:45 UTC+8	Joseph Nii Amugi 54'	Report	Ryan Hammad 20'; Rohisham 50'; Haykal Danish 76' (pen.)	Stadium: Tampin Mini Stadium

14 February 2026	Malaysian University	3–0	Perlis GSA	Nilai
16:45 UTC+8	Arif Imran 25'; Hafiz Abdul Karim 42' (o.g.); Haziq Deli 75'	Report		Stadium: USIM Stadium

15 February 2026	Kelantan WTS	2–1	Immigration II	Kota Bharu
20:45 UTC+8	Faisal Rosli 3' (o.g.); Akif Afizi 67' (o.g.)	Report	Said Khamis 9'	Stadium: Sultan Muhammad IV Stadium

15 February 2026	Kedah Darul Aman	1–6	Seoul Phoenix	Jitra
16:45 UTC+8	Faris Hafiy 5'	Report	Seidou Ismaila 27', 47', 80', 85'; Afif Jazimin 67'; Precious Allwell 72'	Stadium: MPKP Mini Stadium

16 February 2026	Manjung City	0–3	Kedah FA	Seri Manjung
20:45 UTC+8		Report	Chukwu Chijioke 20'; Aiman Afif 60'; Nabil Latpi 90'	Stadium: Manjung Municipal Council Stadium

8 April 2026	Kelantan Red Warrior	0–1	Perak FA	Kota Bharu
20:45 UTC+8				Stadium: Sultan Muhammad IV Stadium

=== Matchweek 22 ===
27 March 2026	Kelantan WTS	3–0	Machan	Kota Bharu
20:45 UTC+8				Stadium: Sultan Muhammad IV Stadium

28 March 2026	UM-Damansara United	2–0	Kedah Darul Aman	Kuala Lumpur
16:45 UTC+8				Stadium: UM Arena Stadium

28 March 2026	Perlis GSA	0–3	Manjung City	Kangar
20:45 UTC+8				Stadium: Tuanku Syed Putra Stadium

29 March 2026	Selangor II	4–0	Immigration II	Shah Alam
16:45 UTC+8				Stadium: UiTM Stadium

29 March 2026	Kedah FA	2–1	Armed Forces	Alor Setar
20:45 UTC+8				Stadium: Darul Aman Stadium

30 March 2026	Perak FA	2–0	Malaysian University	Chemor
16:45 UTC+8				Stadium: Chepor SSI Mini Stadium, Perak Football Complex

30 March 2026	Seoul Phoenix	0–2	Bunga Raya	Petaling Jaya
16:45 UTC+8				Stadium: Persada PLUS Mini Stadium

30 March 2026	Johor Darul Ta'zim II	2–1	Kelantan Red Warrior	Pasir Gudang
20:45 UTC+8				Stadium: Pasir Gudang Corporation Stadium

=== Matchweek 23 ===
3 April 2026	Kedah Darul Aman	1–4	Kedah FA	Jitra
16:45 UTC+8				Stadium: MPKP Mini Stadium

4 April 2026	Immigration II	7–1	Seoul Phoenix	Serdang
16:45 UTC+8	Hazim Abu Zaid 9'; Afiq Hilman 21', 24', 45+2'; Alif Romli 53' (pen.); Farish Daniel 64'; Furqan Azri 75'	Report	Seidou Ismaila 11'	Stadium: UPM Stadium

4 April 2026	Armed Forces	3–0	Perlis GSA	Kuala Lumpur
16:45 UTC+8				Stadium: Mindef Stadium

4 April 2026	Manjung City	0–0	Perak FA	Seri Manjung
20:45 UTC+8				Stadium: Manjung Municipal Council Stadium

5 April 2026	Malaysian University	0–1	Johor Darul Ta'zim II	Shah Alam
16:45 UTC+8				Stadium: UiTM Stadium

6 April 2026	Bunga Raya	0–1	UM-Damansara United	Tampin
16:45 UTC+8				Stadium: Tampin Mini Stadium

6 April 2026	Kelantan WTS	1–3	Selangor II	Kota Bharu
20:45 UTC+8				Stadium: Sultan Muhammad IV Stadium

2026	Machan	cancelled	Kelantan Red Warrior
16:45 UTC+8

=== Matchweek 24 ===
10 April 2026	Kedah FA	5–0	Bunga Raya	Alor Setar
20:45 UTC+8				Stadium: Darul Aman Stadium

10 April 2026	Perlis GSA	2–0	Kedah Darul Aman	Kangar
20:45 UTC+8				Stadium: Tuanku Syed Putra Stadium

11 April 2026	UM-Damansara United	3–1	Immigration II	Kuala Lumpur
16:45 UTC+8				Stadium: UM Arena Stadium

11 April 2026	Johor Darul Ta'zim II	2–1	Manjung City	Pasir Gudang
20:45 UTC+8				Stadium: Pasir Gudang Corporation Stadium

12 April 2026	Kelantan Red Warrior	6–0	Malaysian University	Kota Bharu
20:45 UTC+8				Stadium: Sultan Muhammad IV Stadium

13 April 2026	Seoul Phoenix	0–4	Kelantan WTS	Petaling Jaya
16:45 UTC+8				Stadium: Persada PLUS Mini Stadium

13 April 2026	Perak FA	0–0	Armed Forces	Chemor
16:45 UTC+8				Stadium: Chepor SSI Mini Stadium, Perak Football Complex

Selangor II	cancelled	Machan

=== Matchweek 25 ===
17 April 2026	Bunga Raya	3–1	Perlis GSA	Tampin
16:45 UTC+8				Stadium: Tampin Mini Stadium

18 April 2026	Kedah Darul Aman	0–2	Perak FA	Jitra
16:45 UTC+8				Stadium: MPKP Mini Stadium

18 April 2026	Armed Forces	2–2	Johor Darul Ta'zim II	Kuala Lumpur
16:45 UTC+8				Stadium: Mindef Stadium

18 April 2026	Kelantan WTS	1–0	UM-Damansara United	Kota Bharu
20:45 UTC+8				Stadium: Sultan Muhammad IV Stadium

19 April 2026	Immigration II	0–0	Kedah FA	Serdang
16:45 UTC+8				Stadium: UPM Stadium

19 April 2026	Selangor II	5–0	Seoul Phoenix	Shah Alam
16:45 UTC+8				Stadium: UiTM Stadium

20 April 2026	Kelantan Red Warrior	4–0	Manjung City	Kota Bharu
20:45 UTC+8				Stadium: Sultan Muhammad IV Stadium

Machan	cancelled	Malaysian University

=== Matchweek 26 ===
24 April 2026	Perak FA	6–2	Bunga Raya	Chemor
16:45 UTC+8				Stadium: Chepor SSI Mini Stadium, Perak Football Complex

24 April 2026	Johor Darul Ta'zim II	6–0	Kedah Darul Aman	Pasir Gudang
20:45 UTC+8				Stadium: Pasir Gudang Corporation Stadium

25 April 2026	UM-Damansara United	1–3	Selangor II	Kuala Lumpur
16:45 UTC+8				Stadium: UM Arena Stadium

25 April 2026	Kelantan Red Warrior	3–0	Armed Forces	Kota Bharu
20:45 UTC+8				Stadium: Sultan Muhammad IV Stadium

26 April 2026	Malaysian University	0–1	Manjung City	Shah Alam
16:45 UTC+8				Stadium: UiTM Stadium

27 April 2026	Perlis GSA	2–8	Immigration II	Kangar
20:45 UTC+8				Stadium: Tuanku Syed Putra Stadium

27 April 2026	Kedah FA	2–0	Kelantan WTS	Alor Setar
20:45 UTC+8				Stadium: Darul Aman Stadium

2026	Seoul Phoenix	cancelled	Machan
16:45 UTC+8

=== Matchweek 27 ===
2 May 2026	Kedah Darul Aman	0–3	Kelantan Red Warrior	Jitra
16:45 UTC+8		Report	Abd. Latiff Suhaimi 68'; Emmanuel Mbarga 74', 79'	Stadium: MPKP Mini Stadium

2 May 2026	Immigration II	2–2	Perak FA	Serdang
16:45 UTC+8	Hazim Abu Zaid 11'; Said Khamis 20'	Report	Ekene Victor 16' (pen.); Afifin Arfa 45'	Stadium: UPM Stadium

2 May 2026	Seoul Phoenix	1–8	UM-Damansara United	Kuala Lumpur
16:45 UTC+8	Seidou Ismaila 11'	Report	Shafizi Iqmal 30', 37', 44' (pen.); Thankgod Michael 61', 82'; A. Shivan Pillay 74'; Taha M. Khalid 76'; Saiful Iskandar Adha 90+2'	Stadium: UM Arena Stadium

2 May 2026	Malaysian University	1–0	Armed Forces	Shah Alam
16:45 UTC+8	Mirza Malik 45+2'	Report		Stadium: UiTM Stadium

2 May 2026	Kelantan WTS	3–0	Perlis GSA	Kota Bharu
20:45 UTC+8	Emmanuel Nganzi 6'	Report		Stadium: Sultan Muhammad IV Stadium

4 May 2026	Bunga Raya	0–2	Johor Darul Ta'zim II	Tampin
16:45 UTC+8		Report	Celso Bernmejo 45+9' (pen.)	Stadium: Tampin Mini Stadium

4 May 2026	Selangor II	2–1	Kedah FA	Shah Alam
16:45 UTC+8		Report	Rahmat Makasuf 24'	Stadium: UiTM Stadium

2026	Machan	cancelled	Manjung City
16:45 UTC+8

=== Matchweek 28 ===
8 May 2026	Bunga Raya	0–2	Manjung City	Tampin
16:45 UTC+8				Stadium: Tampin Mini Stadium

8 May 2026	Kelantan Red Warrior	2–0	Kelantan WTS	Kota Bharu
20:45 UTC+8				Stadium: Sultan Muhammad IV Stadium

9 May 2026	Perak FA	2–0	Seoul Phoenix	Chemor
16:45 UTC+8	Ekene Victor 53'; Alif Zikri 81'	Report		Stadium: Chepor SSI Mini Stadium, Perak Football Complex

9 May 2026	Kedah Darul Aman	0–1	Armed Forces	Jitra
16:45 UTC+8		Report	Aqil Syahmi 28'	Stadium: MPKP Mini Stadium

9 May 2026	Perlis GSA	0–4	UM-Damansara United	Kangar
16:45 UTC+8				Stadium: Tuanku Syed Putra Stadium

10 May 2026	Malaysian University	1–1	Immigration II	Shah Alam
16:45 UTC+8				Stadium: UiTM Stadium

11 May 2026	Johor Darul Ta'zim II	3–2	Selangor II	Pasir Gudang
20:45 UTC+8				Stadium: Pasir Gudang Corporation Stadium

2026	Kedah FA	cancelled	Machan
16:45 UTC+8

=== Matchweek 29 ===
15 May 2026	Bunga Raya	1–3	Malaysian University	Tampin
16:45 UTC+8				Stadium: Tampin Mini Stadium

16 May 2026	Kedah Darul Aman	0–5	Manjung City	Jitra
16:45 UTC+8		Report	Syamin Baharuddin 25' (pen.), 90+2'; Amreel Iqbal 49'; Sobri Hasri 53'; Daniel Edzuan 73'	Stadium: MPKP Mini Stadium

16 May 2026	UM-Damansara United	2–3	Kedah FA	Kuala Lumpur
16:45 UTC+8	A. Shivan Pillay 7'; Taha M. Khalid 90+3'	Report	Chijioke Chukwu 36' (pen.), 58'; Aiman Afif 58'	Stadium: UM Arena Stadium

16 May 2026	Seoul Phoenix	3–1	Perlis GSA	Petaling Jaya
16:45 UTC+8	Afiq Haikal 45+3'; Ibrahim Yahaya 66'; Seidou Ismaila 89'	Report	Hafizi Mat Podzi 28'	Stadium: Persada Plus Mini Stadium

17 May 2026	Immigration II	0–1	Kelantan Red Warrior	Kota Bharu
20:45 UTC+8				Stadium: Sultan Muhammad IV Stadium

17 May 2026	Selangor II	1–2	Perak FA	Shah Alam
20:45 UTC+8				Stadium: UiTM Stadium

18 May 2026	Kelantan WTS	2–2	Johor Darul Ta'zim II	Kota Bharu
20:45 UTC+8				Stadium: Sultan Muhammad IV Stadium

2026	Machan	cancelled	Armed Forces
16:45 UTC+8

=== Matchweek 30 ===
23 May 2026	Perak FA	2–0	Kelantan WTS	Chemor
16:45 UTC+8	Wan Zack Haikal 45+2'; Hazim Jamal Hisam 65'	Report		Stadium: Chepor SSI Mini Stadium, Perak Football Complex

23 May 2026	Kedah FA	3–0	Seoul Phoenix	Alor Setar
20:45 UTC+8	Rahmat Makasuf 22'; Barathkumar Ramaloo 27', 71'	Report		Stadium: Darul Aman Stadium

23 May 2026	Manjung City	1–0	Armed Forces	Seri Manjung
20:45 UTC+8	Amreel Iqbal 72'	Report		Stadium: Manjung Municipal Council Stadium

23 May 2026	Kelantan Red Warrior	2–1	Bunga Raya	Kota Bharu
20:45 UTC+8	Niam Muhassan 45+2'; Emmanuel Mbarga 73'	Report		Stadium: Sultan Muhammad IV Stadium

24 May 2026	Malaysian University	5–1	Kedah Darul Aman	Shah Alam
16:45 UTC+8	Adim Muzahhir 23'; Arif Imran 72'; Ahmad Haikal 81'; Hakimi 88' (o.g.); Muhammad Syafiq 90+1'	Report	Hairil Syazwan 4'	Stadium: UiTM Stadium

24 May 2026	Johor Darul Ta'zim II	1–1	Immigration II	Pasir Gudang
20:45 UTC+8	Naim Zainudin 87'	Report	Said Khamis 51'	Stadium: Pasir Gudang Corporation Stadium

24 May 2026	Perlis GSA	0–1	Selangor II	Kangar
20:45 UTC+8		Report	Aiman Yusuf 28'	Stadium: Tuanku Syed Putra Stadium

2026	UM-Damansara United	cancelled	Machan
16:45 UTC+8

== Season statistics ==
=== Top goalscorers ===
As of 24 May 2026

Rank	Player	Team	Goals
1	(Cameroon) Emmanuel Mbarga	Kelantan Red Warrior	32
2	(Malaysia) Rahman Daud	Selangor II	24
3	(Tanzania) Said Khamis	Immigration II	22
4	(Spain) Celso Bermejo	Johor Darul Ta'zim II	18
5	(Malaysia) Shafizi Iqmal Khirudin	UM-Damansara United	16
6	(Nigeria) Ekene Victor Emewulu	Perak FA	12
7	(Malaysia) Hadi Mohamad	Armed Forces	10
7	(Malaysia) Aiman Afif	Kedah FA	10
7	(Malaysia) Aqil Hilman	Kelantan WTS	10
7	(Malaysia) Syamin Baharuddin	Manjung City	10
11	(Malaysia) Hairul Iqmal Raffi	Armed Forces	8
11	(Malaysia) Hazim Abu Zaid	Immigration II	8
11	(Malaysia) Rahmat Makasuf	Kedah FA	8
11	(Malaysia) Haykal Danish	Selangor II	8
11	(Malaysia) Nabil Qayyum	Selangor II	8
11	(Cameroon) Ismaila Seidou	Seoul Phoenix	8

=== Own goals ===
As of 15 February 2026

Rank	Player	Team	Against	Date	Number
1	(Malaysia) Naaim Firdaus	Immigration II	Armed Forces	8 August 2025	1
1	(Malaysia) Faris Danish	Johor Darul Ta'zim II	Seoul Phoenix	16 August 2025	1
1	(Malaysia) Hazrie Zulhadi	Kedah Darul Aman	Kelantan WTS	12 September 2025	1
1	(Malaysia) Harith Bisyari	Malaysian University	Manjung City	9 November 2025	1
1	(Malaysia) Aiman Danial	Malaysian University	Kelantan WTS	9 January 2026	1
1	(Malaysia) Hafiz Abdul Karim	Perlis GSA	Malaysian University	14 February 2026	1
1	(Malaysia) Faisal Rosli	Immigration II	Kelantan WTS	15 February 2026	1
1	(Malaysia) Akif Afizi	Immigration II	Kelantan WTS	15 February 2026	1

=== Hat-tricks ===
As of 15 February 2026

Player	For	Against	Result	Date
(Malaysia) Nabil Qayyum	Selangor II	Machan	0–8 (A)	24 October 2025
(Malaysia) Abdul Rahman Daud	Selangor II	Machan	0–8 (A)	24 October 2025
(Malaysia) Aiman Afif	Kedah FA	Machan	0–4 (A)	26 November 2025
(Malaysia) Syamin Baharuddin	Manjung City	Kedah Darul Aman	4–0 (H)	19 December 2025
(Malaysia) Faizal Kadir	Perlis GSA	Seoul Phoenix	8–0 (H)	20 December 2025
(Malaysia) Shafizi Iqmal	UM-Damansara United	Machan	0–3 (A)	25 December 2025
(Spain) Celso Bermejo	Johor Darul Ta'zim II	Seoul Phoenix	0–9 (A)	11 January 2026
(Cameroon) Emmanuel Mbarga	Kelantan Red Warrior	Seoul Phoenix	6–0 (H)	21 January 2026
(Spain) Celso Bermejo ^{4} (2)	Johor Darul Ta'zim II	Perlis GSA	6–1 (H)	2 February 2026
(Malaysia) Hairul Iqmal	Armed Forces	Seoul Phoenix	0–6 (A)	7 February 2026
(Cameroon) Seidou Ismaila ^{4}	Seoul Phoenix	Kedah Darul Aman	1–6 (A)	15 February 2026

Note: ^{4} – player scored 4 goals
Note: ^{5} – player scored 5 goals

=== Clean sheets ===
As of 5 October 2025

Rank	Player	Team	Clean sheets
1	(Malaysia) Rajendran A/L Veloo	Kedah FA	13
2	(Malaysia) Zulhilmi Sharani	Johor Darul Ta'zim II	11
3	(Malaysia) Shafiq Afifi	Kelantan Red Warrior	9
3	(Malaysia) Syazwan Syazany	Perak FA	9
5	(Malaysia) Azim Al-Amin	Selangor II	3
5	(South Korea) Jihon Oh	Seoul Phoenix	3
5	(Malaysia) Syazwan Syazany	Perak FA	3
8	(Malaysia) Ameerul Eqhwan	UM-Damansara United	2
8	(Malaysia) Hafizuddin Azuhar	Armed Forces	2
8	(Malaysia) Kamarul Hilmi Adenan	Perlis GSA	2
8	(Malaysia) Syazwan Yusoff	Kelantan WTS	2
12	(Malaysia) Al-Iman Wahiey	Seoul Phoenix	1
12	(Malaysia) Asyraf Fadhil	Malaysian University	1
12	(Malaysia) Aqil Syahmi	Kedah Darul Aman	1
12	(Malaysia) Azeem Farhan	Bunga Raya	1
12	(Malaysia) Hazeem Iman	Immigration II	1
12	(Malaysia) Izarul Adli	Immigration II	1

== See also ==
- 2025–26 Malaysia Super League
- 2025–26 Malaysia A2 Amateur League
- 2025–26 Malaysia A3 Community League
- 2025 Malaysia FA Cup
