= 2026–27 Malaysia A1 Semi-Pro League =

Malaysia A1 Semi-Pro League
- Season: 2026–27
- Dates: 28 August 2026 – 23 May 2027
- Matches: 21
- Goals: 21 (1 per match)
- Top goalscorer: 7 goals Celso Bermejo (Johor Darul Takzim II)
- Biggest home win: 7 goals Selangor II 7–1 Malaysian University-UiTM (18 Sep 2026)
- Biggest away win: 7 goals Armed Forces 0–7 Perak FA (6 September 2026)
- Highest scoring: 8 goals Selangor II 7–1 Malaysian University-UiTM (18 Sep 2026)
- Longest winning run: Johor Darul Ta'zim II; Kedah FA (4 matches)
- Longest unbeaten run: Kelantan City (8 matches)
- Longest winless run: Bunga Raya (5 matches)
- Longest losing run: Bunga Raya (5 matches)
- All statistics correct as of 1 November 2026.

The 2026–27 Malaysia A1 Semi-Pro League is the sixth season of the Malaysia A1 Semi-Pro League, currently the second tier football league in Malaysia, since its establishment in 2019. Johor Darul Ta'zim II are the defending champions, having won their first A1 Semi-Pro League title in the previous season.

== Competition format ==
The tournament is played as follows:

- League structure and matches: Each of the 14 teams competes in a round-robin format — playing home and away.
  - Mid-season: The top three teams at mid-season qualify for the 2027 Malaysia Cup.
  - End of season: The top two teams are promoted to the Malaysia Super League.
  - The bottom two teams are relegated to the Malaysia A2 Amateur League.
- Foreign players:
  - Each team is allowed three foreign players.

== Team changes ==
The following teams have changed division since the 2025–26 season.

=== To the A1 Semi-Pro League ===
▼ Ejected from the Super League

- ~~The Real Warriors~~
- ~~PDRM~~

▲ Promoted the from A2 Amateur League

- USM
- AAK-UNISEL

Transferred from the Piala Presiden

- Negeri Sembilan II

=== From the A1 Semi-Pro League ===
▲ Promoted to the Super League

- Kelantan Red Warrior

▼ Relegated to the A2 Amateur League

- Kedah Darul Aman

Withdrew

- Seoul Phoenix
- Perlis GSA
- Machan^{^{1}}
- The Real Warriors^{^{2}}
- PDRM^{^{2}}

=== Name changes ===
- Kelantan WTS was rebranded to Kelantan City
- AAK Puncak Alam collaborated with UNISEL F.C. and renamed to AAK-UNISEL
- Malaysian University F.T. collaborated with UiTM United and is renamed to Malaysian University-UiTM

Notes:

^1 Withdrew
^2 Expelled from Super League; however, the teams were not registered to the 2026–27 Malaysia A1 Semi-Pro League

== Stadiums and locations ==
Team	Location	Stadium	Capacity
(Selangor) AAK-UNISEL	Kuala Selangor	Kuala Selangor Stadium	10,000
Armed Forces	Kampung Datuk Keramat	Mindef Stadium	5,000
(Negeri Sembilan) Bunga Raya	Bandar Sri Sendayan	IRC Arena Sendayan	500
Johor Darul Ta'zim II	Larkin, Johor	Tan Sri Dato' Haji Hassan Yunos Stadium	30,000
Kedah FA	Alor Setar	Darul Aman Stadium	32,387
Kelantan City	Kota Bharu	Sultan Muhammad IV Stadium	30,000
Malaysian University-UiTM	Shah Alam	UiTM Stadium	10,000
(Perak) Manjung City	Seri Manjung	Manjung Municipal Council Stadium	15,000
Negeri Sembilan II	Tampin	Tampin Mini Stadium	3,000
Perak FA	Chemor	Chepor SSI Mini Stadium, Perak Football Complex	1,000
Selangor II	Shah Alam	UiTM Stadium	10,000
(Selangor) UM-Damansara United	Kuala Lumpur	UM Arena Stadium	1,500
(Penang) USM	George Town, Penang	USM Stadium	1,500

=== Locations ===
Locations of teams in the 2026–27 Malaysia A1 Semi-Pro
Klang Valley

== Personnel, kits and sponsoring ==
Team	Head coach	Captain	Kit manufacturer	Kit sponsors	
Team	Head coach	Captain	Kit manufacturer	Main	Other(s)
AAK-UNISEL	(Malaysia) Rezal Zambery	(Malaysia) Saiful Ridzuwan	(Malaysia) AAK Sportswear	UNISEL	List: Front: None; Back: Sinar Harian, AAK Engineering; Sleeves: AAK Life-X; Shorts:
Armed Forces	(England) Kevin Cooper	(Malaysia) Faiz Ibrahim	(Malaysia) Altr.gg	None	List: Front: Back: Sleeves: Shorts:
Bunga Raya	(Malaysia) Azzmi Aziz	(Malaysia) Fauzan Fauzi	(Malaysia) Kimicom Jersey	Bunga Raya Group of Football	List: Front: Back: Kimicom Jersey, Arena IRC Negeri Sembilan; Sleeves: Shorts:
Johor Darul Ta'zim II	(Spain) Josep Ferré	(Malaysia) Aysar Hadi	(United States) Nike	JMYR Stablecoin	List: Front: None; Back: Toyota; Sleeves: JCORP; Shorts: None
Kedah FA	(Malaysia) Akmal Rizal	(Senegal) Papé Diakité	(England) Mitre	Experience Kedah	List: Front: MBI Kedah, PKNK; Back: Pancaran Matahari, CT Global; Sleeves: Shorts:
Kelantan City	(Uruguay) Alfredo González	(Malaysia) Wan Zaharulnizam Zakaria	(Malaysia) PUC Sport	Niemans	List: Front: Mukreez Construction, WNS; Back: PUC Sport; Sleeves: Shorts:
Malaysian University	(Malaysia) Mohd Yazli Yahya	(Malaysia) Akimie Amran	(Malaysia) Let's Play Performance	None	List: Front: Back: Sleeves: Shorts:
Manjung City	(Romania) Andreas Spier	(Malaysia) Syamin Baharuddin	(Malaysia) EFS	Discover Manjung	List: Front: Back: Arwana Group; Sleeves: Restoran Madinah; Shorts:
Negeri Sembilan II	(Malaysia) Norhafiz Zamani	(Malaysia) Adam Haikal Azizol	(Thailand) Warrix	Matrix Concept	List: Front: NR, MBI Negeri Sembilan; Back: SAINS, IRC; Sleeves: NS Corporation, Gemencheh Granite Sdn Bhd; Shorts: None
Perak FA	(Malaysia) Noor Zaidi Rohmat	(Malaysia) Kamal Arif Azrai	(Malaysia) AL Sports	Perak Sejahtera 2030	List: Front: Perbadanan Setiausaha Kerajaan Negeri Perak, MB Inc.; Back: Darul Ridzuan Integrity Champion, Al-Ikhsan Sports; Sleeves: Lembaga Air Perak, Perbadanan Pertanian Negeri Perak; Shorts:
Selangor II	(Malaysia) Arulchelvan Illenggo	(Malaysia) Muhammad Khalil	(Germany) Adidas	PKNS	List: Front: Grantt Lubricants, SANI, MBI Selangor, Al Kauthar Eduqids; Back: Provident Fiduciaries Berhad, Daikin, KUSEL; Sleeves: Sime Darby Property, MBPJ; Shorts:
UM-Damansara United	(Malaysia) Asri Ninggal	(Malaysia) Hariz Mansor	(Malaysia) Line7	TouchTronics	List: Front: Back: Fexiebowl Langkawi, Sportflex; Sleeves: Extra Joss; Shorts:
USM	(Malaysia) Azizul Ahmad Sabri	(Malaysia) Mohd Redzuan Suhaidi	(Malaysia) Line7		List: Front: Back: Sleeves: Shorts:

== Foreign players ==
The number of foreign players is restricted to two per team. Note: Flags indicate national team as has been defined under FIFA eligibility rules. Players may hold more than one non-FIFA nationality.

Team	Player 1	Player 2	Player 3	Former players^{1}
AAK-UNISEL	(South Korea) Yoo Siwon	(Nigeria) ThankGod Michael	(Nigeria) Riliwan Okedara	—N/a
Armed Forces	(South Korea) Seungwon Jung	—N/a	—N/a	—N/a
Bunga Raya	(Algeria) Chamseddine Amara	(Ghana) Aminu Maiga	(South Korea) Youngju Soung	—N/a
Johor Darul Ta'zim II	(Brazil) Dani Bolt (Note: Registered in Super League & A1 Semi-Pro League))	(Spain) Celso Bermejo	(Spain) Jon Landa	—N/a
Kedah FA	(Kenya) Raymond Mbugua Murugi	(Ghana) Anthony Arthur	(Guinea) Ibrahima Barry	—N/a
Kelantan City	(Ghana) Dandy Arbdallah	(Nigeria) Emmanuel Uzochukwu	(Ivory Coast) Abdoul Aziz Doumbia	—N/a
Malaysian University	—N/a	—N/a	—N/a	—N/a
Manjung City	(Ghana) Godfred Asante	(Ghana) Daniel Kwabena Adjei	(Ghana) Amos Kofi Nkrumah	—N/a
Negeri Sembilan II	(Mongolia) Filip Andersen	(England) Anuar Ceesay	(Germany) Andreas Chin Heimerl	—N/a
Perak FA	(Nigeria) Precious Uchenna	(Nigeria) Chukwu Chijioke	(Brazil) Luan Borges	—N/a
Selangor II	(Brazil) Pedro Ataide	(South Korea) Kwak Sung-hoon	—N/a	—N/a
UM-Damansara United	(Argentina) Nicolas Vargas Valinotti	(Morocco) Taoufiq Hannioui	(Brazil) Pablo Carvalho	—N/a
USM	(The Gambia) Ahmad K. Saidy	(The Gambia) Musa J. Camara	—N/a	—N/a

- Players name in **bold** indicates that the player was registered during the mid-season transfer window.

== Standings ==
=== League table ===
Pos	Team	Pld	W	D	L	GF	GA	GD	Pts	Qualification or relegation
1	Johor Darul Ta'zim II	9	8	0	1	26	9	+17	24	Ineligible for promotion (Note: Parent team in Malaysia Super League / developmental team)
2	Kedah FA	8	6	1	1	20	7	+13	19	Promotion to the 2027–28 Malaysia Super League
3	Selangor II	8	5	1	2	17	7	+10	16	Ineligible for promotion
4	UM-Damansara United	9	5	1	3	13	10	+3	16	Promotion to the 2027–28 Malaysia Super League
5	Kelantan City	9	4	4	1	9	7	+2	16	
6	USM	8	5	0	3	14	15	−1	15	
7	Perak FA	9	4	2	3	22	10	+12	14	
8	Bunga Raya	9	4	0	5	11	18	−7	12	
9	AAK-UNISEL	8	3	1	4	9	13	−4	10	
10	Armed Forces	9	3	0	6	13	15	−2	9	
11	Negeri Sembilan II	8	2	0	6	8	14	−6	6	Ineligible for promotion
12	Manjung City	10	1	1	8	9	26	−17	4	
13	Malaysian University	10	1	1	8	12	32	−20	4	Relegation to the 2027–28 Malaysia A2 Amateur League
14	Immigration II	0	0	0	0	0	0	0	0	Withdrew (Note: On 20 November 2026, the AFL announced they accepted the withdrawal of Imigresen FC II. Their points and goals were expunged.)

Updated to match(es) played on 20 Nov 2026. Source: AFL
Rules for classification: 1) Points; 2) Goal difference; 3) Number of goals scored.

=== Position by round ===
Team ╲ Round	1	2	3	4	5	6	7	8	9	10	11	12	13	14	15	16	17	18	19	20	21	22	23	24	25	26
AAK-UNISEL	12	13	10	7	5	6	5	8																		
Armed Forces	4	9	12	6	11	7	9	9																		
Bunga Raya	2	7	4	10	12	12	12	12																		
Johor Darul Ta'zim II	1	3	3	4	2	2	1	1																		
Kedah FA	7	10	8	11	7	3	2	2																		
Kelantan City	8	5	6	5	4	5	4	4																		
Malaysian University	9	11	14	12	13	13	14	14																		
Manjung City	10	12	13	14	14	14	13	13																		
Negeri Sembilan II	11	6	9	13	10	11	10	10																		
Perak FA	5	1	2	2	8	9	7	6																		
Selangor II	3	2	1	1	1	1	3	3																		
UM-Damansara Utd	13	8	5	8	3	4	8	7																		
USM	14	14	11	9	6	8	6	5																		

Champion & qualification for Malaysia Super League
Qualification for Malaysia Super League
Relegation to A2 Amateur League

Source: AFL

== Fixtures and results ==
=== Results table ===
Home \ Away	AAK	AFC	BGR	JDT	KED	WTS	MAU	MCT	NSE	PRK	SEL	UMD	USM
AAK-UNISEL		1–0	–	1–3	–	–	–	–	–	–	2–1	–	–
Armed Forces	–		6–0	0–1	–	0–1	4–0	–	–	0–7	–	–	–
Bunga Raya	3–1	–		–	–	0–1	–	2–1	3–1	–	1–3	0–2	–
Johor Darul Ta'zim II	–	–	–		–	–	4–3	1–0	–	5–2	–	1–2	5–0
Kedah FA	–	2–0	–	–		1–1	4–1	–	–	–	1–0	–	3–1
Kelantan City	1–1	–	–	0–3	–		–	–	2–0	0–0	–	–	–
Malaysian University	–	–	1–2	–	–	1–1		–	–	0–5	–	2–0	–
Manjung City	–	1–2	–	–	1–4	1–2	2–1		–	–	–	–	1–3
Negeri Sembilan II	0–1	2–1	–	1–3	3–1	–	–	–		–	0–1	–	–
Perak FA	–	–	–	–	–	–	–	4–0	2–1		0–1	0–0	–
Selangor II	–	–	–	–	–	–	7–1	2–2	–	–		–	–
UM-Damansara United	3–1	–	–	–	0–4	–	–	5–0	–	–	0–2		1–0
USM	2–1	–	2–0	–	–	–	3–2	–	–	3–2	–	–	

Updated to match(es) played on 20 Nov 2026. Source: FAM-CMS
Legend: Blue = home team win; Yellow = draw; Red = away team win.
For upcoming matches, an "a" indicates there is an article about the rivalry between the two participants.

=== Results by match played ===
Team ╲ Round	1	2	3	4	5	6	7	8	9	10	11	12	13	14	15	16	17	18	19	20	21	22	23	24	25	26
AAK-UNISEL	L	L	W	W	W	D	W	L	L																	
Armed Forces	W	L	L	W	L	W	L	L	L				W													
Bunga Raya	W	L	W	L	L	L	L	L	W																	
Johor Darul Ta'zim II	W	W	L	L	W	W	W	W	W																	
Kedah FA	D	L	W	D	W	W	W	W	W																	
Kelantan City	D	W	D	D	W	D	W	W	W																	
Malaysian University	D	L	L	W	L	L	L	L	L				L													
Manjung City	L	L	D	L	L	W	L	L	L																	
Negeri Sembilan II	L	W	L	L	W	L	W	L	L																	
Perak FA	W	W	D	L	L	D	W	W	L																	
Selangor II	W	W	D	W	L	W	L	W	W																	
UM-Damansara Utd	L	W	W	L	W	D	L	W	W																	
USM	L	L	W	W	W	L	W	W	–																	

Updated to match(es) played on 15 Nov 2026. Source: FAM
W = Win; D = Draw; L = Lose; P = Postponed; C = Withdrawn

== Season statistics ==
=== Top goalscorers ===
As of 1 Nov 2026

Rank	Player	Team	Goals
1	(Spain) Celso Bermejo	Johor Darul Ta'zim II	7
2	(The Gambia) Musa J Camara	USM FC	6
3	(Nigeria) Thankgod Michael	AAK-UNISEL	5
3	(Malaysia) Syukur Fariz Januri	Johor Darul Ta'zim II	5
3	(Malaysia) Fazli Ghazali	Kelantan City	5
6	(Senegal) Jacque Faye	Immigration II	4
6	(Malaysia) Afeeq Iqmal	Kedah FA	4
6	(Malaysia) Aiman Afif	Kedah FA	4
6	(Malaysia) Airiel Zafran	Negeri Sembilan II	4
6	(Malaysia) Daniel Hakimi	Perak FA	4
6	(Nigeria) Chukwu Chijioke	Perak FA	4
6	(Brazil) Pedro Ataide	Selangor II	4
6	(Malaysia) Aiman Fitrie	USM FC	4
14	ten players		3
15	twenty-four players		2
16	thirty-six players		1

=== Hat-tricks ===
As of 25 Oct 2026

Player	For	Against	Result	Date
(Malaysia) Fazli Ghazali	Kelantan City	Immigration FC II	0–4 (A)	25 Oct 2026

Note: ^{4} – player scored 4 goals
Note: ^{5} – player scored 5 goals

== See also ==
- 2026–27 Malaysia Super League
- 2026–27 Malaysia A2 Amateur League
- 2026–27 Malaysia A3 Community League
- 2026–27 Malaysia FA Cup
