= Malaysian University F.T. =

Malaysian football club

Malaysian University-UiTM
- Full name: Malaysian University-UiTM Football Team
- Nickname: University Tigers
- Short name: MUFT-UiTM
- Founded: 2021; 5 years ago (as Malaysian University Football Team)
- Ground: USIM Stadium; INSPEN Stadium
- Capacity: 1,000; 500
- Owner: Ministry of Higher Education
- President: Dato' Pekan Ramli
- Head coach: Mohd Yazli Yahya
- League: Malaysia A1 Semi-Pro League
- 2025–26: Malaysia A1 Semi-Pro League, 11th of 16
- Website: Malaysian University
Home colours	Away colours

Malaysian University-UiTM Football Team is a university football club currently competing in the Malaysia A1 Semi-Pro League. The club is under the jurisdiction of higher education institution of Malaysia, Ministry of Higher Education (Kementerian Pendidikan Tinggi).

== History ==
=== Origins and league progression ===
Established in 2021, the club entered the third-tier Malaysia M3 League for the 2022 season, initially playing out of UKM Bangi Stadium in Bangi and finishing 9th. The squad improved to a 6th-place finish in the 2023 campaign. Following the restructuring of Malaysia's second division, MUFT secured a 5th-place finish out of 15 teams in 2024–25. This followed with 11th-place in 2025–26.

Ahead of the 2026–27 Malaysia A1 Semi-Pro League season, the team partnered with UiTM United and officially rebranded as Malaysian University-UiTM Football Team (MUFT-UiTM).

=== 2024 Malaysia FA Cup ===
Making their debut in the Malaysia FA Cup in 2024, MUFT achieved the biggest milestone in club history on June 12. They defeated top-flight side PDRM FC 3–0 in the Round of 16, marking their first-ever competitive victory against a first-tier club. Their cup run ended in the quarter-finals after facing reigning champions Johor Darul Ta'zim (JDT), falling 0–13 on aggregate.

== Players ==
=== First-team squad ===
As of 28 August 2026

Note: Flags indicate national team as defined under FIFA eligibility rules; some limited exceptions apply. Players may hold more than one non-FIFA nationality.

No.	Pos.	Nation	Player
1	GK	MAS	Aiman Haziq Mohd Raimi^{U22}
2	DF	MAS	Putra Daniel Danies^{U22}
3	DF	MAS	Ahmad Taufik Lukman^{U22}
4	DF	MAS	Syafiq Nurul Hisham^{U22}
5	DF	MAS	Farhan Rahim
6	MF	MAS	Akimie Amran (captain)
9	FW	MAS	Arif Imran Rahim^{U22}
10	FW	MAS	Adim Muzahhir
11	FW	MAS	Asyraaf Rifqi Rosli^{U22}
13	MF	MAS	Syahmi Iman Mohd Noor^{U22}
15	MF	MAS	Nuh Azlan Syah^{U22}
17	MF	MAS	Haris Zafri Hashim

No.	Pos.	Nation	Player
18	MF	MAS	Arif Ilham Idwan Shah
19	DF	MAS	Amirul Fazly Zamri
20	MF	MAS	Adam Ilmam
21	DF	MAS	Mohd Izzan Nazran^{U22}
22	GK	MAS	Azim Nasri Issan
23	DF	MAS	Hariz Husaini Harimanto^{U22}
26	MF	MAS	Aiman Danial^{U22}
27	MF	MAS	Kadim As Syahid^{U22}
28	MF	MAS	Aqil Haziq Azmi^{U22}
29	MF	MAS	Haikal Haziq
30	GK	MAS	Hazeem Iman Faizal
88	MF	MAS	Aiyubi Solahuddinnizam

== Club officials ==
Position	Name
President	(Malaysia) Datuk Dr. Pekan Ramli
Team manager	(Malaysia) Ahmad Tarmizy Mohammed
Assistant manager	(Malaysia) Hairi Hashim
Head coach	(Malaysia) Mohd Yazli Yahya
Assistant coach	(Malaysia) Fadhil Hashim
Goalkeeping coach	(Malaysia) Jamsari Sabian
Fitness coach	(Malaysia) Muhammad Hazeq Nordin
Physiotherapy	(Malaysia) Muhammad Hasif Hilmi M. Hazman
Team doctor	(Malaysia) Farirruddin Rastam
Media officer	(Malaysia) Khairul Akhyar Husain
Team analyst	(Malaysia) Muhammad Zahir Imran

== Kit manufacturer and shirt sponsor ==
Season	Manufacturer	Sponsor
2022	Lotto	
2023	Ma7ch	MBSB Bank
2024–2025	Let's Play	MBSB Bank, Matrix Concepts Holdings Berhad
2025–	Let's Play	

== Season by season record ==
Season	Division	Position	Malaysia Cup	Malaysian FA Cup	Malaysian Charity Shield	Regional	Top scorer (all competitions)
2022	Liga M3	9th place	DNQ	DNQ	–	–	(Malaysia) Ahmad Hijazi (3)
2023	Liga M3	6th place	DNQ	DNQ	–	–	(Malaysia) Saiful Iskandar Adha (6)
2024–25	Liga A1 Semi-Pro	5th of 15	DNQ	Quarter-finals	–	–	(Malaysia) Zulkarnain Nasir (13)
2025–26	Liga A1 Semi-Pro	11th of 16	DNQ	Round of 16	–	–	(Malaysia) Arif Imran (7)

== See also ==
- UM-Damansara United
- UiTM United
- USM F.C.
- UKM F.C.
- UM Arena Stadium
- UKM Bangi Stadium
