= Hazim Abu Zaid =

Malaysian footballer

Personal information
- Full name: Muhammad Hazim bin Abu Zaid
- Date of birth: 17 January 2001 (age 25)
- Place of birth: Sungai Udang, Malaysia
- Height: 1.75 m (5 ft 9 in)
- Position: Forward

Team information
- Current team: Immigration
- Number: 17

Youth career
- –2019: Melaka United

Senior career*
Years	Team	Apps	(Gls)
2020–2023	Melaka United	9	(0)
2023–25	Immigration	10	(1)
2025–26	Immigration II	10	(1)

International career^{‡}
2018	Malaysia U18	0	(0)
2019–2020	Malaysia U19	3	(1)
2021–2023	Malaysia U23	1	(0)
- * Club domestic league appearances and goals as of 9 May 2021 ‡ National team caps and goals as of 30 December 2023

Muhammad Hazim bin Abu Zaid (born 17 January 2001) is a Malaysian professional footballer who plays as a forward for Malaysia Super League club Immigration.

== Club career ==
=== Melaka United ===
Hazim began his football career in the youth system of Melaka United, eventually earning a promotion to the senior team in 2020. Since then, he has made several appearances for the club in the top flight of Malaysian football.

=== Immigration FC ===
On 1st January 2023, Hazim joined Malaysia A1 Semi-Pro League club Immigration on a permanent deal.

== International career ==
Hazim has represented Malaysia at youth levels, including the Malaysia U19, where he earned three caps and scored one goal between 2019 and 2020.

== Career statistics ==
As of match played 9 June 2025

Appearances and goals by club, season and competition
Club	Season	League			Cup		League cup		Others		Total	
Club	Season	Division	Apps	Goals	Apps	Goals	Apps	Goals	Apps	Goals	Apps	Goals
Melaka United
Melaka United	2020	Malaysia Super League	1	0	0	0	0	0	-	-	1	0
Melaka United	2021	Malaysia Super League	6	0	0	0	0	0	-	-	6	0
Melaka United	2022	Malaysia Super League	2	0	0	0	1	0	-	-	3	0
Melaka United	Total		9	0	0	0	1	0	0	0	10	0
Immigration	2023	Malaysia M3 League	7	0	0	0	2	0	–		9	0
Immigration	Total		7	0	0	0	2	0	–		9	0
Career total			16	0	0	0	2	0	0	0	19	0

== Honours ==
Malaysia U23

- ASEAN U-23 Championship 4th Place: 2023
