= Immigration FC II =

Malaysian football club

Imigresen II
- Full name: Immigration Football Club II
- Nickname: The Mighty Tigers
- Short name: IFC II
- Founded: 2015; 11 years ago
- Ground: UPM Stadium
- Owner: Immigration Department of Malaysia
- Head coach: S. Balachandran
- League: Malaysia A1 Semi-Pro League
- 2025–26: Malaysia A1 Semi Pro-League, 10th of 16
Home colours	Away colours

Immigration Football Club II (Malay: Kelab Bola Sepak Imigresen II), commonly known as Imigresen FC II, is a Malaysian developmental football club based in Serdang. The club currently competes in the Malaysia A1 Semi-Pro League, the second tier of the Malaysian football league system. It serves as the reserve team for Star City FC, which competes in the top-flight Malaysia Super League.

== History ==
Immigration FC II was established as the developmental and reserve squad for Immigration FC. In the 2025–26 season, the club finished 10th in the league and was initially placed on the waiting list for the subsequent season. Following the criteria and documentation review by the Amateur Football League (AFL) in August 2026, Immigration FC II, alongside AAK UNISEL FC, was approved to complete the 14-team roster for the 2026–27 Malaysia A1 Semi-Pro League campaign.

== Stadium and Infrastructure ==
The club plays its home matches at the UPM Stadium located in Serdang, Selangor. The stadium is shared with other local sports institutions and features a synthetic turf pitch.

== Players ==
=== First-team squad ===
As of September 2026

Note: Flags indicate national team as defined under FIFA eligibility rules; some limited exceptions apply. Players may hold more than one non-FIFA nationality.

No.	Pos.	Nation	Player
1	GK	MAS	Izarul Adli
2	DF	MAS	Izwan Freddy^{U22}
4	DF	HUN	Ismail Ahmed Taha
6	DF	NGR	Mathias Joseph
8	MF	MAS	Azalinullah Alias
9	MF	MAS	Alif Romli
10	MF	MAS	Kogileswaran Raj
11	FW	MAS	Jenalter Justin^{U22}
12	DF	MAS	Qayyum Marjoni
14	FW	SEN	Jacque Faye
15	DF	MAS	Hariz Kamaruddin
16	MF	MAS	Furqan Azri (captain)

No.	Pos.	Nation	Player
17	MF	MAS	Hasanudin Abdul Hadi^{U22}
19	MF	MAS	Danish Abrisham^{U22}
26	MF	MAS	Syafiq Aiman^{U22}
27	DF	MAS	Muhamad Hafiz Johar
29	FW	MAS	Putra Ryan Edzri^{U22}
30	GK	MAS	Henry Smith Ampuling^{U22}
32	FW	MAS	Shahmi Irfan Talah
33	MF	MAS	Fikri Shah
59	DF	MAS	Danish Haziq
73	MF	MAS	Aiman Danish
80	DF	MAS	Namathevan Arunasalam
97	MF	MAS	Khatul Anuar

== Coaching staff ==
As of August 2026

Position	Name
Technical director	(Malaysia) Datuk Zainal Abidin Hassan
Head coach	(Malaysia) S. Balachandran
1st assistant	(Malaysia) Norhudahiroshi Razak (Malaysia) Razif Shahrizal Hj Ibrahim
2nd assistant	(Malaysia) Muhammad Syawal Othman
Goalkeeping coach	(Malaysia) Abdul Rahman Baba
Physio	(Malaysia) Muhammad Syafiq Hakimi
Team manager	(Malaysia) Raziff Shahrizal Ibrahim
Kitman	(Malaysia) Tasriq Fikrullah

== Head coaches ==
Coach	Years	Honours
(Malaysia) Azlan Ahmad	2025–26	

== Season by season record ==
Season	Division	Position	Malaysia Cup	Malaysian FA Cup	Malaysian Charity Shield	Regional	Top scorer (all competitions)
2025–26	A1 League	10th of 16	DNQ	DNQ	–	–	(Tanzania) Said Khamis (22)
