= Saiful Iskandar =

Malaysian association football player

Personal information
- Full name: Saiful Iskandar Adha bin Saiful Azlan
- Date of birth: 29 March 1999 (age 27)
- Place of birth: Selangor, Malaysia
- Position: Midfielder

Team information
- Current team: UM-Damansara United
- Number: 16

Youth career
- 2017–2019: Selangor youth system
- 2021–2022: Selangor II

Senior career*
Years	Team	Apps	(Gls)
2020	UiTM	7	(0)
2021–2022	Selangor	20	(2)
2023–2025	Malaysian University		

International career^{‡}
2017	Malaysia U19		
Medal record
AFF U-19 Youth Championship
Second place	2017 Myanmar
- * Club domestic league appearances and goals ‡ National team caps and goals as of 12 June 2021

Saiful Iskandar Adha bin Saiful Azlan (born 29 March 1999) is a Malaysian professional footballer who plays as a midfielder.
