= Shivan Pillay =

Malaysian footballer

Personal information
- Full name: Shivan Pillay a/l Asokan
- Date of birth: 7 December 2000 (age 25)
- Place of birth: Kuala Krai, Malaysia
- Height: 1.82 m (6 ft 0 in)
- Position: Centre-back

Team information
- Current team: UM-Damansara United
- Number: 2

Youth career
- 2016–2020: PKNS

Senior career*
Years	Team	Apps	(Gls)
2019–2020	PKNS		
2020–2021	Selangor II	23	(0)
2021	Selangor		
2022	Petaling Jaya City	17	(0)
2023–2024	Perak	19	(1)
2025–	UM-Damansara United		

International career
2017–2020	Malaysia U19	16	(4)
2018–2023	Malaysia U23	11	(2)
- * Club domestic league appearances and goals

Shivan Pillay a/l Asokan (born 7 December 2000) is a Malaysian professional footballer who plays as a centre-back for Malaysia A1 Semi-Pro League club UM-Damansara United.

== Early life and career ==
Shivan was born into a Tamil-Malaysian family in Kuala Krai, Kelantan. Pillay is of Chindian descent through his mother. In 2016, Pillay participated in, and went on to win, Telekom Malaysia's Mencari Ramli 5 reality show. As one of the 15 winners, Pillay got the chance to participate in an intensive football session in Manchester. He has been Adidas Malaysia ambassador since 2019.

== Honours ==
=== Club ===
PKNS

- President Cup: 2019

=== International ===
Malaysia U19

- AFF U-19 Youth Championship: 2018
