= Selangor F.C. Under-23 =

Academy football club based in Shah Alam, Selangor, Malaysia

Selangor II
- Full name: Selangor Football Club II
- Nickname: The Young Giants
- Short name: SEL II
- Founded: 1967; 59 years ago as Pekan Nanas; 2 October 2020; 6 years ago, as Selangor II
- Ground: Petaling Jaya Stadium
- Capacity: 29,661
- Owner: Red Giants FC Sdn Bhd
- Chairman: Tengku Amir Shah
- Head coach: Arulchelvan Illengo
- League: Malaysia A1 Semi-Pro League
- 2025–26: Runners-up
- Website: selangorfc.com
Home colours	Away colours

Selangor Football Club II (Malay: Kelab Bola Sepak Selangor II), or simply Selangor II or Selangor U23, is a reserve team of Malaysian professional football club Selangor, based in Shah Alam, Selangor. The club is currently playing in the Malaysia A1 Semi-Pro League and plays its home matches at Petaling Jaya Stadium.

The club was formerly known as PKNS, before its integration into the Football Association of Selangor, then converted into Selangor II in 2020.

== History ==
=== Beginnings as Pekan Nanas (1967–2003) ===
The Selangor State Development Corporation (Malay: Perbadanan Kemajuan Negeri Selangor) (PKNS) established its Sports and Recreation Club in 1967. In the 1970s and 1980s, its football team was one of the teams in the state of Selangor that competed in the Selangor League at state level. It competed in the Malaysia FAM Cup (Football Association of Malaysia) at the national level, with players such as Mokhtar Dahari, R. Arumugam, K. Rajagopal, Reduan Abdullah and Santokh Singh. In 1978, PKNS's Sports and Recreational Club was the runner-up at the Malaysia FAM Cup. In 1979, PKNS won the Malaysia FAM Cup.

=== As PKNS (2004–2019) ===
After winning the Malaysia FAM Cup in 2003, the club was formed as a professional entity known as PKNS to compete in the newly formed Malaysia Premier League which was organized by the FAM. They were promoted to the league in 2004 as champions of the Malaysia FAM Cup the previous year, staying in the division for the rest of the 2000s. In 2012, PKNS extended its wings to the Malaysia Super League after winning the Malaysia Premier League in the 2011 season. The club played in the country's top division league for two seasons before being relegated to the Malaysia Premier League in the 2014 season. The club achieved promotion back to the Malaysia Super League after finishing second in 2016.

=== Privatization of PKNS (2020–present) ===
As part of the privatization effort by the Malaysian Football League, PKNS was incorporated as a private company under the name of PKNS Sports Sdn Bhd. In 2016, PKNS left its affiliation with the Football Association of Selangor in order to comply with the licensing requirements. The club chose to affiliate itself with the Selangor Malays Football Association when the FAS decided to halt PKNS's participation in the 2017 Malaysia Super League. The club obtained the FAM CLR license to play in the 2018 Malaysia Super League.

== Players ==
=== Selangor II squad & personnel ===
As of 29 August 2026

Note: Flags indicate national team as defined under FIFA eligibility rules; some limited exceptions apply. Players may hold more than one non-FIFA nationality.

No.	Pos.	Nation	Player
1	GK	MAS	Hazriq Haqqim
2	DF	MAS	Aiman Yusuf
3	DF	MAS	Irfan Aswad
4	DF	MAS	Aiman Hakimi
5	MF	MAS	Afiq Danish
6	MF	MAS	Nazwan Abdullah
8	MF	MAS	Zamil Zaqwan
9	FW	MAS	Hatif Irfan
10	MF	MAS	Haykal Danish
11	FW	MAS	Rohisham Haiqal
12	FW	MAS	Izzat Syahir
13	DF	MAS	Moses Raj
14	FW	MAS	Hakim Hassan
15	DF	KOR	Kwak Sung-hoon

No.	Pos.	Nation	Player
16	MF	MAS	Danish Iskandar
17	FW	MAS	Nabil Fitri
18	FW	MAS	Adam Mikaeel
19	DF	MAS	Ryan Hammad
20	MF	MAS	Hafifi Muhtadee
22	GK	MAS	Farish Farhan
23	GK	MAS	Nazim Roslan
24	DF	MAS	Aiman Amsyar
26	DF	MAS	Danish Irfan Ezal
27	DF	MAS	Amir Farhan
28	MF	MAS	Muhammad Khalil (captain)
29	DF	MAS	Zharif Zaini
30	FW	BRA	Pedro Ataíde (on loan from APOEL)
33	MF	MAS	Danial Hqzeiry

== Management and staff ==
As of 29 August 2026

Position	Name
Technical Director	(France) Christophe Gamel
Assistant Manager	(Malaysia) Md Adi Harmizi
Head coach	(Malaysia) Arulchelvan Illenggo
Assistant coach	(Malaysia) Amirizdwan Taj
Goalkeeping coach	(Malaysia) Hamsani Ahmad
Fitness coach	(Malaysia) Fariq Abd Rahman
Team doctor	(Malaysia) Ezzat Naim
Physiotherapist	(Malaysia) Afiq Jamarudin
Team coordinator	(Malaysia) Felicia Adele Ng
Team analyst	(Malaysia) Rafiudin Sa'ari
Nutritionist	(Malaysia) Nurin Irdiena Ifqan
Masseur	(Malaysia) Ikhwan Idris
Masseur	(Malaysia) Ikhram Abd Ghani
Kitman	(Malaysia) Afif Fahmi

== Honours ==
=== Domestic ===
==== League ====
- Division 2/Malaysia Premier League
  - Winners (1): 2011
  - Runners-up (1): 2016
- Division 2/Malaysia A1 Semi-Pro League
  - Runners-up (1): 2025–26
- Division 3/Malaysia FAM League
  - Winners (3): 1978, 1979, 2003

==== Cups ====
- Malaysia FA Cup
  - Runners-up (1): 2016
- MFL Cup
  - Runners-Up (1): 2024–25

== Award winners ==
During PKNS era (2004–2019)

=== Domestic ===
- League Golden Boot
  - (Liberia) Kpah Sherman (2019)

=== Others ===
- Best Football Club
  - 2011
- Best Asean Players
  - (Singapore) Faris Ramli (2018)

== Notable players ==
PKNS players only (2004–2019)

=== International capped players ===
AFC/OFC.: (Australia) Zac Anderson; (Cambodia) Chan Vathanaka; (Indonesia) Hamka Hamzah; (Kyrgyzstan) Tamirlan Kozubayev; (Palestine) Matías Jadue; (Singapore) Faris Ramli; (South Korea) Park Kwang-il; (Timor-Leste) Pedro Henrique	CAF.: (The Gambia) Abdou Jammeh; (Liberia) Kpah Sherman; (Liberia) Patrick Wleh; (Tunisia) Helmi Loussaief	UEFA.: (Croatia) Karlo Primorac; (Portugal) Fabio Ferreira	CONMEBOL/ CONCACAF.: –NIL–

== Managerial history ==
Years	Name	Notes
2003–2006	(Malaysia) Azmi Adnan	
2007–2012	(Malaysia) Yaacob Jailani	
2013	(Malaysia) Azmi Adnan	
2014–2019	(Malaysia) Mahfizul Rusydin Abdul Rashid	
2020–present	(Malaysia) Sugumaran Parthasarathy	

=== Head coaches ===
Years	Name	Notes
As PKNS
2003–2008	(Malaysia) Mohd Zaki Sheikh Ahmad	
2006–2008	(Malaysia) Ismail Ibrahim	
2008	(Malaysia) K. Gunalan	
2009–2013	(Malaysia) Abdul Rahman Ibrahim	2011 Malaysia Premier League
2014	(Malaysia) Wan Jamak	
2015–2017	(Malaysia) E. Elavarasan (Malaysia) Asaph SD	
2017	(Malaysia) Adam Abdullah	As a caretaker from 8 July 2017 until 16 July 2017
2017	(Germany) Sven Gartung	From 17 July 2017 until 21 November 2017
2017–2019	(Malaysia) K. Rajagopal	From 22 November 2017
As Selangor II
2019–2022	(Germany) Michael Feichtenbeiner	
2023–2025	(Netherlands) Abdifitaah Hassan	
2025–2026	(France) Christophe Gamel	
2026–present	(Malaysia) Arulchelvan Illenggo	

== Season by season record ==
1st or Champions 2nd or Runner-up 3rd place Promotion Relegation Relocated

Season	League										Cup			Top goalscorer(s)	
Season	League	Pld	W	D	L	GF	GA	GD	Pts	Pos	CC	FA	MC	Player(s)	Goals
PKNS Football Club
2003	FAM League									1st	—			Unknown	
2004	Premier League	24	13	4	7	47	35	+12	43	6th	—			(Slovakia) Roman Chmelo	10 (Note: Goals count does not include domestic cup competition.)
2005	Premier League	21	13	2	6	46	25	+21	41	6th	—			(Slovakia) Roman Chmelo (Malaysia) Rudie Ramli	13
2005–06	Premier League	21	11	6	4	39	25	+14	39	4th	—			Unknown	
2006–07	Premier League	20	9	5	6	29	27	+2	32	3rd	—	QF	—	Unknown	
2007–08	Premier League	24	5	7	12	27	38	-11	22	11th	—	1R	—	Unknown	
2009	Premier League	24	8	7	9	20	24	-4	31	7th	—	1R	—	Unknown	
2010	Premier League	22	14	3	5	56	18	+38	45	3rd	—	2R	GS	(Malaysia) Zamri Hassan	20
2011	Premier League	22	18	3	1	51	7	+44	57	1st	—	2R	GS	(Malaysia) Khairul Akhyar	11
2012	Super League	26	8	11	7	35	35	0	35	7th	—	1R	GS	(Guadeloupe) Michaël Niçoise	7
2013	Super League	22	8	4	10	34	34	0	28	8th	—	2R	QF	(Liberia) Patrick Wleh	14
2014	Super League	22	4	6	12	24	40	-16	18	12th	—	QF	—	(Liberia) Patrick Wleh	11
2015	Premier League	22	11	8	3	41	22	+19	41	4th	—	1R	QF	(Argentina) Gabriel Guerra	16
2016	Premier League	22	15	3	4	49	25	+74	48	2nd	—	RU	QF	(Argentina) Gabriel Guerra (Argentina) Juan Cobelli	15
2017	Super League	22	6	7	9	33	38	-5	25	7th	—	2R	GS	(Liberia) Patrick Wleh	8
2018	Super League	22	10	5	7	37	29	+8	35	3rd	—	SF	QF	(Brazil) Bruno Matos (Brazil) Rafael Ramazotti	7
2019	Super League	22	5	6	11	37	28	+9	21	9th	—	QF	GS	(Liberia) Kpah Sherman	17
Selangor II
2020	Premier League	11	4	1	6	17	23	-6	13	7th	—	CXL (Note: Competition cancelled due to the COVID-19 pandemic in Malaysia.)	CXL	(Malaysia) Danial Asri	6
2021	Premier League	20	5	9	6	27	26	+1	24	9th	—	—	—	(Ghana) George Attram	9
2022	Premier League	18	4	4	10	14	25	-11	16	9th	—	—	—	(Malaysia) Nik Sharif	4
2023	MFL Cup	19	9	5	5	28	15	13	32	4th	—	—	—	(Malaysia) Aliff Izwan	4
2024–25	MFL Cup	24	16	4	4	61	24	+37	52	2nd	—	—	—	(Malaysia) Abdul Rahman Daud	12
2025–26	A1 Semi-Pro League	28	19	4	5	63	20	+43	61	2nd	—	—	—	(Malaysia) Abdul Rahman Daud	24

== Selangor Under-20 squad & personnel ==
=== Current squad ===
As of 29 January 2026

Note: Flags indicate national team as defined under FIFA eligibility rules; some limited exceptions apply. Players may hold more than one non-FIFA nationality.

No.	Pos.	Nation	Player
3	DF	MAS	Shakir Nasir
4	DF	MAS	Mulia Hairi
7	FW	MAS	Zamirul Hakim
9	FW	MAS	Izzat Syahir
10	FW	MAS	Syahir Sukri
11	FW	MAS	Adam Fitri
14	DF	MAS	Ariz Zuhayr
16	DF	MAS	Nazwan Abdullah
18	DF	MAS	Ryan Fahreen
19	DF	MAS	Danial Razali
20	MF	MAS	Harith Safuan
21	MF	MAS	Airiel Nazrin
22	GK	MAS	Nazmi Roslan
24	DF	MAS	Ryan Zulfarhan
25	GK	MAS	Parid Hidayatulloh
30	MF	MAS	Adam Mikaeel
31	GK	MAS	Farish Farhan
32	MF	MAS	Amirul Izwan

No.	Pos.	Nation	Player
35	DF	MAS	Airel Husainy
38	FW	MAS	Dainei Mat Disa
40	MF	MAS	Nabil Fitri
42	FW	MAS	Anjasmirza Sharudin
43	DF	MAS	Zainurhakimi Zain
44	DF	MAS	Irfan Afif
46	MF	MAS	Syahmi Zufayri
47	MF	MAS	Rusyaidi Fahmi
49	DF	MAS	Hafifi Muhtadee
70	MF	MAS	Zamil Zaqwan
80	DF	MAS	Nazwie Hakimi
81	MF	MAS	Irfan Zakwan
84	FW	MAS	Aiman Amsyar
85	GK	MAS	Alif Aiman
86	MF	MAS	Hakim Hassan
87	FW	MAS	Hatif Irfan
91	MF	MAS	Abrisham Fadzir

=== Management team ===
As of 29 January 2026

Position	Name
Team manager	(Malaysia) Saharom Mohni
Assistant manager	(Malaysia) Azree Izuan
Head coach	(Malaysia) Firdaus Aziz
Assistant coach	(Malaysia) Izzat Nazari
Goalkeeping coach	(Malaysia) Sani Anuar Kamsani
Fitness coach	(Malaysia) Azmi Isaik
Physiotherapist	(Malaysia) Zhariff Ismail
Masseur	(Malaysia) Zunur Ain
Kitman	(Malaysia) Vadivelu Rethinam

== Selangor Under-18 squad & personnel ==
=== Current squad ===
As of 29 January 2026

Note: Flags indicate national team as defined under FIFA eligibility rules; some limited exceptions apply. Players may hold more than one non-FIFA nationality.

No.	Pos.	Nation	Player
1	GK	MAS	Iman Faiz
2	DF	MAS	Helmi Ismail
5	DF	MAS	Aqil Qhuzaikel
6	DF	MAS	Faiz Danial
8	MF	MAS	Ryady Raziq
12	MF	MAS	Danial Hqzeiry
17	MF	MAS	Mikail Hamidi
23	MF	MAS	Adib Endy
26	DF	MAS	Isyraf Rizal
27	MF	MAS	Aniq Qhushainie
28	MF	MAS	Rayyan Danial
29	DF	MAS	Tuan Amirul Daniel
33	DF	MAS	Airil Izzan
37	MF	MAS	Ivan Chua Wei Leh

No.	Pos.	Nation	Player
39	DF	MAS	Wan Raif Muqriz
41	FW	MAS	Ting Tze Young
45	MF	MAS	Muayyad Daud
48	DF	MAS	Aidiel Zacharia
55	FW	MAS	Fahrin Danny
70	MF	MAS	Ahmad Zamil Zaqwan
77	GK	MAS	Adam Danish
78	GK	MAS	Naufal Sukiman
82	DF	MAS	Ahmad Danish Ashraf
83	MF	MAS	Wan Ahmad Farhan
88	MF	MAS	Putera Haikal
89	GK	MAS	Irfan Azzrai
90	FW	MAS	Zarul Aidid
99	FW	MAS	Sean Fareez

=== Management team ===
As of 29 January 2026

Position	Name
Team manager	(Malaysia) Simon Lim
Assistant manager	(Malaysia) Nadzri Bakar
Head coach	(Malaysia) Khushairi Abdul Wahab
Assistant coach	(Malaysia) Syahid Zaidon
Goalkeeping coach	(Malaysia) Badrulzaman Abdul Halim
Fitness coach	(Malaysia) Ahmad Azra'e Rishal
Physiotherapist	(Malaysia) Gary Tan Sean Huey
Team analyst	(Malaysia) Arman Manar
Masseur	(Malaysia) Fua-ad Zohdi
Kitman	(Malaysia) Farhan Sulaiman
