= Said Khamis =

Tanzanian footballer (born 2000)

Personal information
- Full name: Said Khamis Said
- Date of birth: 20 July 2000 (age 26)
- Place of birth: Ilemala, Tanzania
- Height: 1.81 m (5 ft 11 in)
- Position: Forward

Team information
- Current team: Immigration
- Number: 77

Youth career
- 2019: Mbao Mwanza
- 2020–2021: Baniyas

Senior career*
Years	Team	Apps	(Gls)
2021–2022	Baniyas	24	(1)
2022–2023	Hatta	11	(1)
2023	Fujairah	13	(2)
2023–2024	Jedinstvo Ub	17	(1)
2025–	Immigration II	11	(8)
2026–	Immigration	0	(0)

International career^{‡}
2022–	Tanzania	4	(1)
- * Club domestic league appearances and goals as of 11 August 2025 ‡ National team caps and goals as of 17 January 2025

Said Khamis Said (born 20 July 2000) is a Tanzanian professional footballer who plays as a forward for Malaysia Super League club Immigration.

== Club career ==
=== Jedinstvo Ub ===
In September 2023, Khamis signed a contract with Serbian club Jedinstvo Ub. He made his in league debut on 30 September 2023 against Mačva Šabac. He left the club after the 2023–24 season, according to him, due to disagreements, despite helping the club gain promotion to the 2024–25 Serbian SuperLiga.

=== Immigration II ===
In August 2025, Said Khamis joined Immigration II for the 2025–26 Malaysia A1 Semi-Pro League season.

== Career statistics ==
=== Club ===
As of match played 9 December 2023

Appearances and goals by club, season and competition
Club	Season	League			National cup (Note: Appearance(s) in UAE League Cup)		Europe		Total	
Club	Season	League	Apps	Goals	Apps	Goals	Apps	Goals	Apps	Goals
Baniyas	2021–22	UAE Pro League	24	1	7	3	—		31	4
Jedinstvo Ub	2023–24	Serbian First League	9	1	0	0	–		9	1
Immigration F.C. II	2025–26	Malaysia A1 Semi-Pro League	11	8	0	0	–		11	8
Career total			44	10	7	3	0	0	51	13

=== International ===
Statistics accurate as of match played 28 March 2023.

Tanzania
Year	Apps	Goals
2022	2	1
2023	2	0
Total	4	1

Scores and results list Tanzania's goal tally first, score column indicates score after each Khamis goal.

List of international goals scored by Said Khamis
No.	Date	Venue	Opponent	Score	Result	Competition
1	27 September 2022	Martyrs of February Stadium, Benghazi, Libya	Libya	1–1	1–2	Friendly
