= Seoul Phoenix FC =

South Korean football club

Seoul Phoenix
- Full name: Seoul Phoenix Football Club
- Nickname: The Phoenix
- Short name: SPFC
- Founded: 17 January 2023; 3 years ago (as Vanesse FC); 2024; 2 years ago (as Sejong SA FC); 2025; 1 year ago (as Seoul Phoenix FC)
- Ground: PLUS Mini Stadium; MMU Stadium
- Capacity: 1,000; 2,500
- Owner: Kwon Hyuk-hoon
- Chairman: Seo Jin-young; Byun Byeong-ju
- Head coach: Ariff Hashim
- League: Malaysia A1 Semi-Pro League
- 2025–26: Malaysia A1 Semi-Pro League, 13th of 16
Home colours	Away colours

Seoul Phoenix Football Club is a South Korean football club. In the past, they played in Sejong, but were refounded and relocated to Cyberjaya, Malaysia.

== History ==
Founded on 17 January 2023 as Vanesse FC (Korean: 바네스 FC), the club has participated in the K4 League. The club has been renamed twice, as FC Sejong in 2024 and as Seoul Phoenix FC (Korean: 서울 피닉스 FC) in 2025. The club debuted in the Malaysian football league system in the 2025–26 Malaysia A1 Semi-Pro League season.

== Players (2025) ==
Note: Flags indicate national team as defined under FIFA eligibility rules; some limited exceptions apply. Players may hold more than one non-FIFA nationality.

No.	Pos.	Nation	Player
1	GK	MAS	Vikneswaran Krisnan
2	MF	KOR	Lim Oh-Kyu
5	MF	MAS	Wan Syamil Sulaiman
6	MF	KOR	Song Young-Ju
7	DF	KOR	Jung Eun-Ho
9	DF	KOR	Yi Ji-Seok
10	MF	KOR	Choi Chan-Yang (captain)
12	DF	KOR	Park Pyeong-An
13	MF	KOR	Oh Sang-Muk
15	MF	MAS	Adam Ilham Idwan Shah
16	MF	KOR	Yu Jun-Hyuk
17	DF	RSA	Mhlengi Sibonani Ndhlovu
18	DF	MAS	Zubair Kamarulzaman
22	MF	KOR	Bang Sun-Woo
23	DF	KOR	Choi Ji-Yun

No.	Pos.	Nation	Player
24	FW	NGA	Allwell Kelvin Chimereucheya
25	FW	KOR	Lim Woo-Jin
26	DF	KOR	Han Seung-Min
27	DF	KOR	Yoon Jeong-Min
28	DF	KOR	Hwang Chan-Won
29	MF	MAS	Danial Ashraf
31	GK	KOR	Ko Su-Wan
32	MF	KOR	Yun So-Myeong
33	MF	MAS	Afif Jazimin
37	DF	MAS	Yusof Umar
39	MF	MAS	Afiq Haikal
66	DF	KOR	Park Se-Hee
77	MF	MAS	Hakimi Mat Isa
99	GK	KOR	Oh Ji-Hun

== Club officials (2025) ==
Position	Name
Technical director	(South Korea) Won-Woong Seok
Team manager	(Malaysia) Mohd Shafiq Rosli
Head coach	(Malaysia) Ariff Hashim
Assistant coach	(Malaysia) Muhammad Hasif
Interpreter	(South Korea) Lim Woo Jin, Junhyeok Oh
Goalkeeper coach	(Malaysia) Muhammad Solehin Abdul Wahab
Fitness coach	(Malaysia) Aiman Afiff
Physio	(Malaysia) Mohammad Fikri Ednizullah
Doctor	(Malaysia) Muhammad Hazwan Khair
Media officer	(Malaysia) Iman Zulhakim

=== Management ===
Position	Name
Chairman	(South Korea) Seo Jin-young, Byun Byeong-ju
Marketing and business management director	(Malaysia) Yap Boon Hup
