= UM-Damansara United =

Malaysian football club

- Full name: UM-Damansara United Football Club
- Nickname: The City Tigers
- Short name: UMDFC
- Founded: 2025; 1 year ago
- Ground: UM Arena Stadium
- Capacity: 1,500
- Owner(s): Damansara Sports Group; University of Malaya
- Head coach: Asri Ninggal
- League: Malaysia A1 Semi-Pro League
- 2026–27: TBA
- Website: umdamansara-fc.my
Home colours	Away colours

UM-Damansara United Football Club, simply known as UM-Damansara United, is a Malaysian professional football club based in Damansara Heights, Kuala Lumpur. The club currently competes in the Malaysia A1 Semi-Pro League, the second tier of the Malaysian football league system. The club's home ground is UM Arena Stadium.

== History ==
=== Foundation and Origins ===
The club was officially established in 2025. Its creation was the result of a strategic merger and structural changes involving two separate entities:

- The Split from Bunga Raya: Previously, a branch operated under Bunga Raya Damansara. Following an agreement by the Damansara Sports Group to branch out into an independent ownership model, the teams separated. While Bunga Raya returned to its original name, the breakaway team was rebranded to focus exclusively on the Damansara identity.
- The University of Malaya Merger: To form a highly competitive outfit, this new Damansara entity merged with Universiti Malaya FC (UMFC), a team widely recognized in the Higher Education Institution (IPT) sports circuit.

This hybrid blueprint allowed the club to blend the academic elite bringing in sports science expertise, high-level university training facilities, and promising campus athletes with established professional and import players.

=== Competitions and Milestones ===
Despite its recent founding, UM Damansara FC quickly established a footprint in national knockout tournaments:

- Debut Season (2025–26): In their inaugural run in the Malaysia A1 Semi-Pro League, they achieved a solid 6th-place finish out of the competitive tier. Their standout performer was Shafizi Iqmal Khirudin, who net 18 goals across all competitions.
- Cup Tournaments: The club managed to qualify for major national tournaments early on, securing appearances in the Malaysia FA Cup and the Malaysia Cup round of 16, where they tested their mettle against top-tier Malaysia Super League giants like Johor Darul Ta'zim (JDT) and Terengganu FC.

== Team Profile & Stadium ==
- Home Ground: The team plays its home matches at the UM Arena Stadium located at the University of Malaya campus, which features a capacity of 1,500 spectators.
- Management: The club's operations are overseen by the Damansara Sports Group alongside the University of Malaya. Asri Ninggal serves as the head coach.

== Players ==
=== Current squad ===
As of August 2026

Note: Flags indicate national team as defined under FIFA eligibility rules; some limited exceptions apply. Players may hold more than one non-FIFA nationality.

No.	Pos.	Nation	Player
2	DF	MAS	Shivan Pillay (captain)
3	DF	MAS	Hariz Mansor
4	DF	MAS	Ghaffar Rahman
5	DF	MAR	Taoufiq Hannioui
7	DF	MAS	Brandon Liew Jun Yuen
8	MF	ARG	Nicolas Vargas Valinotti
9	FW	BRA	Pablo Carvalho
10	FW	MAS	Shafizi Iqmal
11	FW	MAS	Amirul Akmal
12	FW	MAS	Alif Zikri
14	MF	MAS	Syahir Abdul Rahman
16	FW	MAS	Saiful Iskandar
17	MF	MAS	Wan Aqil Hakimi
18	GK	MAS	Muhammad Azfar Arif

No.	Pos.	Nation	Player
19	FW	MAS	Amin Imran^{U22}
20	FW	MAS	Hazim Abu Zaid
21	DF	MAS	Iman Hakimi Aznan
27	DF	MAS	Zahrul Nizam
28	FW	MAS	Azim Rahim (on loan from Melaka)
29	MF	MAS	Arif Shaqirinl
30	GK	MAS	Haziq Mukriz
34	FW	MAS	Eizrul Ashraf
44	MF	MAS	Fariz Saidi^{U22}
53	DF	MAS	Aris Asri
55	GK	MAS	Shukor Aghni^{U22}
77	FW	MAS	Ilhan Hakim
85	MF	MAS	Fadhil Idris

== Club officials ==
Position	Name
Team manager	(Malaysia) Afizal Abu Othman
Assistant manager	(Malaysia) Khairul Fitri Ahmad
Head coach	(Malaysia) Asri Ninggal
Assistant coach	(Malaysia) Ashadi Mohd Yusoff (Malaysia) Mohamad Zahid Hashim
Goalkeeper coach	(Malaysia) Azhar bin Dol
Fitness coach	(Malaysia) Mohd Khalid Mohamed Sain
Team doctor	(Malaysia) Ahmad Hazwan Ahmad Shushami
Physiotherapist	(Malaysia) Mohammad Tasnim Abu Mansor
Kitman	(Malaysia) Khairul Azlan Bin Shahridan

== Season by season record ==
Season	League									FA Cup	M Cup	C Cup	Top goalscorer (all competitions)	
Season	Division	P	W	D	L	F	A	Pts	Pos	FA Cup	M Cup	C Cup	Name	Goals
2025–26	A1 Semi-Pro League	28	14	7	7	50	29	49	6th	Round of 16	Round of 16	QF	(Malaysia) Shafizi Iqmal Khirudin	18
2026–27	A1 Semi-Pro League	0	0	0	0	0	0	0	TBD	Round of 16	TBD	TBD	TBD	TBD

Champions	Runners-up	Promoted	Relegated
