= Manjung City F.C. =

Malaysian football club

Manjung City
- Full name: Manjung City Football Club
- Nickname: The Ocean Rage
- Short name: MCFC
- Founded: 2013; 13 years ago (as Puchong Fuerza)
- Ground: Manjung Municipal Council Stadium
- Capacity: 15,000
- Owner: Manjung Municipal Council
- President: Syamsul Hazeman Md Salleh
- Head coach: Andreas Spier
- League: Malaysia A1 Semi-Pro League
- 2025–26: Malaysia A1 Semi-Pro League, 9th of 16
Home colours	Away colours

Manjung City Football Club is a Malaysian professional football club based in Manjung, Perak. The club plays in the Malaysia A1 Semi-Pro League. The club's home ground is 15,000 capacity Manjung Municipal Council Stadium.

== History ==
The club was founded as Puchong Fuerza Football Club in 2013. They made its debut into Malaysian football by joining the Malaysian fifth-tier Malaysia M5 League in 2018. In 2019, the club competed in the Malaysia FA Cup for the first time in their history.

Starting from 2020 season, Puchong Fuerza sold the right to Manjung City Football Club and relocated to Manjung, Perak. while Puchong Fuerza remained to play in the fifth-tier Malaysia M5 League (Selangor Champions League).

In 2023, the club competed in the Malaysia FA Cup, where they recorded their first ever win against SAINS in a 2–0 home match, before losing to Kelantan 3–0.

=== 2025–26 campaign ===
In the 2025–26 Malaysia A1 Semi-Pro League, Manjung City maintained mid-table position. Under head coach K. Nanthakumar, the club recorded a significant 4–0 home victory against Kedah Darul Aman F.C. on 19 December 2025. They followed this with a 2–1 away win over Immigration FC II on 11 January 2026, showcasing their competitive form in the amateur top flight.

2026-27 campaign

In the 2026-27 Malaysian A1 Semi-Pro League, Manjung City Is Currently On A Relegation Spot (11 Oct) Under Manager Andrei Spier.

== Crests and colours ==
=== Crests ===
2013–2019

2020–Now

Manjung City has utilised one primary crest, before introducing a new in 2020 season, in order to solidify its new branding.

=== Colours ===
Manjung City have worn sea blue with a mixture of yellow for shirts as their home kit. While away colours are usually white or yellow trim.

==== Kit suppliers and shirt sponsors ====
Season	Manufacturer	Sponsor
2019	Figos	
2020	Blackrhinos	Pangkor
2022	Hakka Clo	Lagenda Properties
2023	Cheetah	Manjung Municipal Council; MBSB Bank
2024 - 2025	Hakka Clo	Manjung Municipal Council; MBSB Bank
2025 – 2026	EFS	Discover Manjung

== Players ==
=== Current squad ===
As of September 2026

Note: Flags indicate national team as defined under FIFA eligibility rules; some limited exceptions apply. Players may hold more than one non-FIFA nationality.

No.	Pos.	Nation	Player
1	GK	MAS	Vikneswaran a/l Krisnan
3	DF	MAS	Daniel Edzuan^{U22}
6	DF	MAS	Muhammad Fahim Azhar^{U22} (captain)
7	MF	MAS	Alif Haikal Azmi^{U22}
8	MF	MAS	Hakimi Mat Isa
11	MF	MAS	S. Vimal Nair
12	DF	MAS	Wan Muhammad Iman Iltizam
14	DF	GHA	Godfred Asante
15	MF	GHA	Daniel Kwabena Adjei
16	DF	MAS	Saranraj a/l Kala Arasu
17	MF	MAS	Nazmi Haikal

No.	Pos.	Nation	Player
18	DF	MAS	Aloysius Moses a/l Edward^{U22}
19	FW	GHA	Amos Kofi Nkrumah
20	DF	MAS	Midhyaf Mifdhal ^{U22}
21	DF	MAS	Ahmad Ilhan Hafiz^{U22}
23	MF	MAS	Megat Aniq Muqri^{U22}
24	DF	MAS	Noor Aiman Adha Amir
25	DF	MAS	Nadhir Rizq Iman^{U22}
26	MF	MAS	Alif Afnan Mohd Fazihin^{U22}
28	MF	MAS	Alexander Mahendran
36	GK	MAS	T. Shaheeswaran

== Management team ==
Position	Name
President	(Malaysia) Syamsul Hazeman Md Salleh
Team manager	(Malaysia) Kumaresan A/L Kalaisam
Assistant manager	(Malaysia) Ruzaimi Abu
Head coach	(Romania) Andreas Spier
Assistant coach	(Malaysia) Chandran A/L Munusamy
Goalkeeping coach	(Malaysia) Suhaimi Mat Lazim
Fitness coach	(Malaysia) Badrul Hisham Mohammad Sufian
Physio	(Malaysia) Ahmad Faiz Farhan Zainal
Team media	(Malaysia) Meor Mohamad Amirul
Kitman	(Malaysia) Mohd Farid Che Yahaya (Malaysia) Muhairil Abdul Mutalib

== Season by season record ==
Season	Division	Position	Malaysia Cup	Malaysian FA Cup	Malaysian Charity Shield	Regional	Top Scorer (All Competitions)
2019	Liga M3	4th of 14	DNQ	Preliminary round	–	–	(Ghana) Hans Kwofie (13)
2020^{1}	Liga M3	Season abandoned	DNQ	Preliminary round	–	–	None
2021	Liga M3	not held due to COVID-19 pandemic					
2022	Liga M3	2nd Group B	DNQ	Preliminary round	–	–	(Malaysia) Saifuddin Khairil Anuar (7)
2023	Liga M3	7th of 14	DNQ	Second Round	–	–	(Malaysia) Afeeq Iqmal (13)
2024–25	Liga A1 Semi-Pro	9th of 15	DNQ	DNQ	–	–	(Malaysia) Saifuddin Khairil Anuar (10)
2025–26	Liga A1 Semi-Pro	9th of 15	DNQ	DNQ	–	–	(Malaysia) Syamin Baharuddin (10)

^1 2020 season cancelled due to the COVID-19 pandemic, no promotion or league title was awarded

== Honours ==
=== Domestic competitions ===
==== League ====
- Puchong Community League

(gold) Winners (1): 2018

- Selangor Champions League

(gold) Winners (1): 2018
