= Manjung Municipal Council Stadium =

Multi-purpose stadium in Seri Manjung, Malaysia

Coordinates: 4°11′40.9″N 100°39′54.0″E

- Interactive map of Manjung Municipal Council Stadium
- Location: Seri Manjung, Perak, Malaysia
- Owner: Manjung Municipal Council
- Capacity: 15,000
- Surface: Grass

Construction
- Opened: 2018; 8 years ago
- Renovated: 2017

Tenants
- Perak II (2019–2025); Manjung City F.C. (2020–present); Perak FC (2024–2025); Perak FA (2025–present)

The Manjung Municipal Council Stadium (Malay: Stadium Majlis Perbandaran Manjung) or Manjung Stadium is a multi-purpose stadium in Seri Manjung, Manjung District, Perak, Malaysia. The stadium was the home of Perak II, as well as Manjung City F.C.

== See also ==
- Sport in Malaysia
