= UM Arena Stadium =

Stadium in Kuala Lumpur, Malaysia

Coordinates: 3°07′51.5″N 101°39′33.6″E

UM Arena
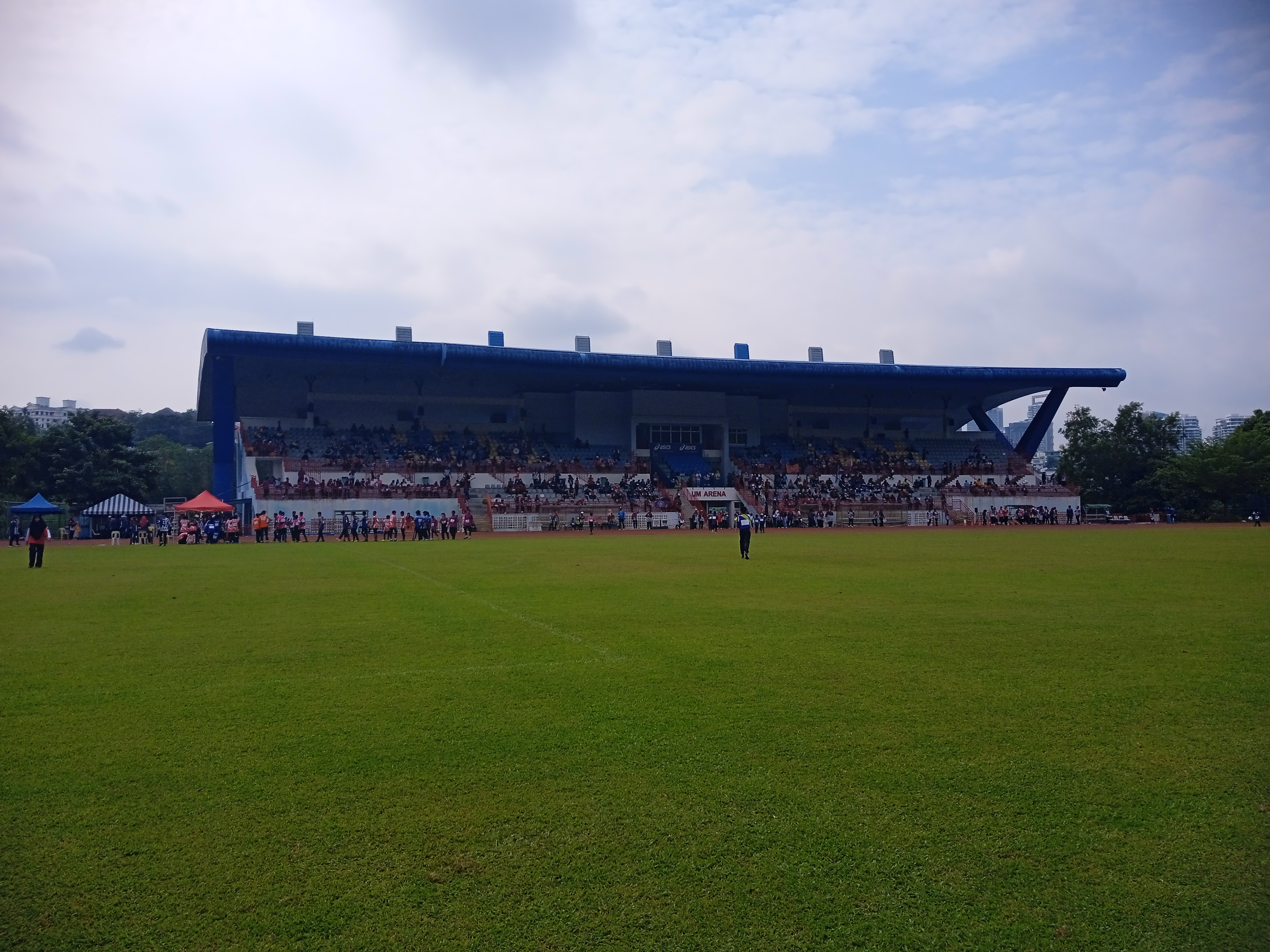
- Interactive map of UM Arena
- Full name: UM Arena
- Address: Jalan Universiti
- Location: Kuala Lumpur, Malaysia
- Owner: University of Malaya
- Capacity: 1,500
- Surface: Grass pitch, track

Construction
- Opened: 2012
- Renovated: 2015

Tenants
- University of Malaya; Malaysian University (2023–presents); PIB (formerly); UM-Damansara United (2025–presents)

The UM Arena Stadium (Malay: Stadium Sains Sukan UM Arena, literally UM Arena Sports Science Stadium) is a stadium located inside the University of Malaya in Kuala Lumpur, Malaysia. It holds 1,500 people. The stadium was used in the 2017 SEA Games football tournament and the 2018 AFC U-16 Championship.
