= 2021 Perak F.C. season =

Perak
2021 season
- Manager: Azman Noh
- Head coach: Chong Yee Fatt (until 2 August 2021); Shahril Nizam (caretaker)
- Stadium: Perak Stadium
- Malaysia Super League: 11th ▼ (relegated)
- Malaysia Cup: Group stage
- Top goalscorer: League: Nana Poku (5); All: Nana Poku (5)
- Highest home attendance: 0
- Lowest home attendance: 0
- Average home league attendance: 0
| Home colours | Away colours |

The 2021 season is Perak's 18th consecutive season in Malaysia Super League, the top flight of Malaysian football. The club also will participate the Malaysia Cup.

== Management team ==
| Position | Staff |
|---|---|
| Head coach | (Malaysia) Chong Yee Fatt |
| Assistant head coach | (Malaysia) Shahril Nizam Khalil |
| Coach | (Malaysia) Syamsul Saad |
| Goalkeeper coach | (Malaysia) Faozi Mukhlas |
| Fitness coach | (Malaysia) Sam Pakiaraj Victor Davaraj |
| Team doctor | (Malaysia) Dr.Vijay Babu Subramaniam |
| Physiotherapist | (Malaysia) Muhammad Afnan Hazazi Mohd |
| Physiotherapist | (Malaysia) Nur Shamimi Alia Shuhami |

== Players ==
| No. | Name | Nat. | Date of birth (age) | Signed from | Contract since | Contract ends |
Goalkeepers
| 1 | Nasrullah Aziz | (Malaysia) | 17 December 1997 (age 28) | Youth team | 2018 | 2021 |
| 28 | Hafizul Hakim | (Malaysia) | 30 March 1993 (age 32) | Melaka United | 2016 | 2021 |
| 30 | Azri Ghani | (Malaysia) | 30 April 1999 (age 26) | Kedah Darul Aman | 2021 | 2022 |
Defenders
| 2 | Danish Haziq | (Malaysia) | 12 September 1997 (age 28) | UiTM | 2021 | 2021 |
| 5 | Jad Noureddine | (Lebanon) | 27 February 1992 (age 33) | Ahed | 2021 | 2021 |
| 6 | Izaaq Izhan | (Malaysia) | 23 January 1995 (age 31) | Negeri Sembilan | 2021 | 2021 |
| 15 | Idris Ahmad | (Malaysia) | 5 May 1990 (age 35) | FELDA United | 2017 | 2021 |
| 17 | Zoubairou Garba | (Indonesia) (Cameroon) | 20 October 1985 (age 40) | Persebaya Surabaya | 2021 | 2021 |
| 22 | Zulkiffli Zakaria | (Malaysia) | 22 February 1997 (age 28) | Youth team | 2021 | 2021 |
| 23 | Amirul Azhan | (Malaysia) | 23 July 1993 (age 32) | Youth team | 2016 | 2021 |
| 25 | Pavithran Selladoria | (Malaysia) | 14 September 1994 (age 31) | Youth team | 2021 | 2021 |
| 26 | Izzat Ramlee | (Malaysia) | 21 June 1997 (age 28) | Youth team | 2019 | 2021 |
| 27 | Nazirul Afif | (Malaysia) | 30 April 1997 (age 28) | Youth team | 2019 | 2021 |
| 33 | Nazmi Ahmad | (Malaysia) | 6 January 1998 (age 28) | Youth team | 2020 | 2021 |
| 50 | Akmal Rizal | (Malaysia) | | Youth team | 2020 | 2021 |
| 82 | Amier Ali | (Malaysia) | | Youth team | 2020 | 2021 |
Midfielders
| 4 | Charlie Machell | (Lebanon) | 25 October 1994 (age 31) | Visakha | 2021 | 2021 |
| 14 | Firdaus Saiyadi | (Malaysia) | 22 October 1996 (age 29) | Youth team | 2016 | 2021 |
| 19 | Farid Khazali | (Malaysia) | 31 March 1998 (age 27) | Youth team | 2020 | 2021 |
| 20 | Rafiuddin Roddin | (Malaysia) | 22 August 1989 (age 36) | Penang | 2018 | 2021 |
| 21 | Samir Ayass | (Lebanon) (Bulgaria) | 24 December 1990 (age 35) | POFC Botev Vratsa | 2021 | 2021 |
| 22 | Zulkiffli Zakaria | (Malaysia) | | | | |
| 29 | Farhan Roslan | (Malaysia) | 3 December 1996 (age 29) | Kedah Darul Aman | 2021 | 2021 |
| 34 | Khairul Amizan | (Malaysia) | 11 March 1998 (age 27) | Youth team | 2020 | 2021 |
| 77 | Adib Raop | (Malaysia) | 25 October 1999 (age 26) | Youth team | 2021 | 2021 |
| 80 | Syafiq Mustaffa | (Malaysia) | | Youth team | | |
| 88 | Izzuddin Roslan | (Malaysia) | 8 December 1999 (age 26) | Youth team | 2021 | 2021 |
| 93 | Aizat Safuan | (Malaysia) | 10 March 1999 (age 26) | Youth team | 2021 | 2021 |
Forwards
| 7 | Nana Poku | (Ghana) | 1 September 1992 (age 33) | UiTM | 2021 | 2021 |
| 9 | Ezequiel Agüero | (Argentina) | 7 April 1992 (age 33) | Sri Pahang | 2021 | 2021 |
| 43 | Syahir Bashah | (Malaysia) | 16 September 2001 (age 24) | Youth team | 2020 | 2021 |
| 75 | Ghislain Guessan | (France) (Ivory Coast) | 15 September 1992 (age 33) | CA Bordj Bou Arréridj | 2021 | 2021 |
Players away on loan
| 21 | Nazirul Naim | (Malaysia) | 6 April 1993 (age 32) | Harimau Muda A | 2016 | 2021 |
Left during the season
| 3 | Shahrul Saad | (Malaysia) | 8 July 1993 (age 32) | FELDA United | 2016 | 2021 |
| 12 | Kenny Pallraj | (Malaysia) | 21 April 1993 (age 32) | Harimau Muda A | 2016 | 2021 |
| 11 | Shakir Hamzah | (Singapore) | 20 October 1992 (age 33) | Kedah Darul Aman | 2021 | 2022 |
| 13 | Guilherme | (Malaysia) (Brazil) | 11 September 1986 (age 39) | Kuala Lumpur City | 2020 | 2021 |
| 16 | Partiban Janasekaran | (Malaysia) | 28 November 1992 (age 33) | Terengganu | 2019 | 2022 |
| 8 | Leandro | (Brazil) | 29 October 1986 (age 39) | Luverdense | 2017 | 2021 |
| 10 | Careca | (Brazil) | 26 August 1995 (age 30) | Cruzeiro | 2019 | 2021 |

== Transfers and contracts ==
=== Transfers in ===
Pre-season

| No. | Pos | Player | Transferred from | Fee | Source |
|---|---|---|---|---|---|
| 30 | GK | (Malaysia) Azri Ghani | (Malaysia) Kedah Darul Aman | Free, 2 years contract signed 2020 | |
| 11 | DF | (Singapore) Shakir Hamzah | (Malaysia) Kedah Darul Aman | Free, 2 years contract signed 2020 | |
| 2 | DF | (Malaysia) Danish Haziq | (Malaysia) UiTM | Free | |
| 29 | MF | (Malaysia) Farhan Roslan | (Malaysia) Kedah Darul Aman | Loan | |

Mid-season

| No. | Pos | Player | Transferred from | Fee | Source |
|---|---|---|---|---|---|
| 7 | FW | (Ghana) Nana Poku | (Malaysia) UiTM | Free | |
| | DF | (Indonesia) (Cameroon) Zoubairou Garba | (Indonesia) Persebaya Surabaya | Undisclosed | |
| | DF | (Lebanon) (Ivory Coast) Hussein El Dor | (Lebanon) Al Ansar | Undisclosed | |
| | DF | (Lebanon) Jad Noureddine | (Lebanon) Ahed | Loan | |
| | MF | (Lebanon) (Bulgaria) Samir Ayass | (Bulgaria) Botev | Undisclosed | |
| | MF | (England) Charlie Machell | (Cambodia) Visakha | Undisclosed | |
| | DF | (Malaysia) Azhar Apandi | (Malaysia) Kuala Lumpur City | Loan | |
| | DF | (Malaysia) Aizzat Maidin | (Malaysia) Kelantan United | Undisclosed | |
| | DF | (Malaysia) Syamin Baharuddin | (Malaysia) Manjung City | Undisclosed | |

=== Transfers out ===
Pre-season

| No. | Pos | Player | Transferred to | Fee | Source |
|---|---|---|---|---|---|
| | GK | (Malaysia) Shafiq Afifi | (Malaysia) Penang | Free | |
| 18 | GK | (Malaysia) Khairul Amri | Unattached | | |
| | DF | (Malaysia) Suwarnaraj Chinniah | (Malaysia) Penang | Free | |
| | DF | (Malaysia) Ezanie Salleh | (Malaysia) Sri Pahang | Free | |
| 24 | DF | (Malaysia) Shathiya Kandasamy | Unattached | | |
| 5 | DF | (Australia) Antony Golec | (Australia) Macarthur | Free | |
| 7 | MF | (Malaysia) Khairil Anuar | (Malaysia) Petaling Jaya City | Free | |
| 93 | MF | (Cambodia) Thierry Bin | (Cambodia) Visakha | Free | |
| 25 | MF | (Malaysia) Hafiz Ramdan | (Malaysia) Sri Pahang | Free | |
| 19 | FW | (Malaysia) Shahrel Fikri | (Malaysia) Selangor | Free | |

Mid-season

| No. | Pos | Player | Transferred to | Fee | Source |
|---|---|---|---|---|---|
| 3 | DF | (Malaysia) Shahrul Saad | (Malaysia) Johor Darul Ta'zim | Undisclosed | |
| 21 | DF | (Malaysia) Nazirul Naim | (Malaysia) Sabah | Loan | |
| 11 | DF | (Singapore) Shakir Hamzah | (Singapore) Tanjong Pagar United | Undisclosed | |
| 12 | MF | (Malaysia) Kenny Pallraj | (Malaysia) Kuala Lumpur City | Undisclosed | |
| 16 | MF | (Malaysia) Partiban Janasekaran | (Malaysia) Kuala Lumpur City | Undisclosed | |
| 13 | FW | (Malaysia) (Brazil) Guilherme | (Malaysia) Johor Darul Ta'zim | Undisclosed | |
| 8 | MF | (Brazil) Leandro | Released | | |
| 10 | MF | (Brazil) Careca | Released | | |

== Friendlies ==
=== Pre-season ===
| 28 February 2021 1 | Perak (Malaysia) | 2–1 | (Malaysia) Penang | Ipoh |
| | Guilherme 13'; Careca 31' | | Al-Hafiz 85' (pen.) | Stadium: Perak Stadium |

=== Mid-season ===
| 10 July 2021 1 | Perak (Malaysia) | 3–2 | (Malaysia) PDRM | Ipoh |
| | Poku 13'; Careca 49'; Guessan 49' | | | Stadium: Perak Stadium |

== Competitions ==
=== Malaysia Super League ===
==== League table ====
| Pos | Team | Pld | W | D | L | GF | GA | GD | Pts | Qualification or relegation |
|---|---|---|---|---|---|---|---|---|---|---|
| 8 | Melaka United | 22 | 5 | 9 | 8 | 25 | 31 | −6 | 21 (Note: Melaka have been docked three points based on the following of the decision from FAM (Football Association of Malaysia).) | |
| 9 | Sabah | 22 | 4 | 7 | 11 | 21 | 38 | −17 | 19 | |
| 10 | Sri Pahang | 22 | 4 | 6 | 12 | 23 | 37 | −14 | 18 | |
| 11 | Perak (R) | 22 | 4 | 4 | 14 | 20 | 45 | −25 | 16 | Relegation to Malaysia Premier League |
| 12 | UiTM (R) | 22 | 3 | 4 | 15 | 16 | 41 | −25 | 13 | Relegation to Malaysia Premier League |

Source: Malaysian Football League
Rules for classification: 1) Points; 2) Goal difference; 3) Number of goals scored.
(R) Relegated

==== Fixtures and results ====
| 7 March 2021 1 | Perak | 0–0 | Petaling Jaya City | Ipoh |
| 21:00 UTC+8 | Amirul (yellow card) 18' | Report | Filemon (yellow card) 59'; Gurusamy (yellow card) 80' | Stadium: Perak Stadium; Attendance: 0 Referee: Razlan Joffri Ali |

| 10 March 2021 2 | Sri Pahang | 0–2 | Perak | Kuantan |
| 21:00 UTC+8 | Pedro (yellow card) 15'; Jadid (yellow card) 79' | Report | Partiban 43'; Farhan 59'; Careca (yellow card) 25'; Hafizul (yellow card) 69'; Leandro (yellow card) 73' | Stadium: Darul Makmur Stadium; Attendance: 0 Referee: Hamdan Awang |

| 14 March 2021 3 | Perak | 0–2 | Terengganu | Ipoh |
| 21:00 UTC+8 | Amirul (yellow card) 50'; Rafiuddin (yellow card) 61'; Leandro (yellow card) 68' | Report | Faisal 25'; Marcel 90' | Stadium: Perak Stadium; Attendance: 0 Referee: Suhaizi Shukri |

| 17 March 2021 4 | Kuala Lumpur City | 3–0 | Perak | Kuala Lumpur |
| 21:00 UTC+8 | da Sylva 40'; Morales 46', 65' | Report | | Stadium: Kuala Lumpur Stadium; Attendance: 0 Referee: Zamzaidi Katimin |

| 21 March 2021 5 | Perak | 2–2 | Johor Darul Ta'zim | Ipoh |
| 21:00 UTC+8 | de Paula 33', 58', (yellow card) 35'; Careca (yellow card) 29'; Kenny (yellow card) 43'; Hafizul (yellow card) 71'; Rafiuddin (yellow card) 90+3' | Report | Akhyar 74'; Velazquez 90+3' (pen.); Insa (yellow card) 21'; Aidil (yellow card) 23'; Maurício (yellow card) 85' | Stadium: Perak Stadium; Attendance: 0 Referee: Noor Azriel Baharuddin |

| 3 April 2021 6 | Penang | 2–1 | Perak | Penang |
| 21:00 UTC+8 | Casagrande 42'; Rafael 71'; Khairu (yellow card) 29' | Report | Careca 12'; Agüero (yellow card) 45+1'; Shahrul (yellow card) 63'; Leandro (yellow card) 82'; Danish (yellow card) 90+4' | Stadium: City Stadium; Attendance: 0 Referee: Hamdan Awang |

| 7 April 2021 7 | Perak | 3–2 | UiTM | Ipoh |
| 21:00 UTC+8 | Careca 45', 77' de Paula 67' (pen.); Kenny (yellow card) 58' | Report | Poku 20' (pen.), 40', (yellow card) 53'; Azfar (yellow card) 29'; Farid (yellow card) 38' | Stadium: Perak Stadium; Attendance: 740; Referee: Muhammad Nazmi Nasaruddin |

| 10 April 2021 8 | Selangor | 3–1 | Perak | Petaling Jaya |
| 21:00 UTC+8 | Olusegun 8', 31' (pen.), (yellow card) 43' | Report | Farid 90+1'; Agüero (yellow card) 40'; Leandro (yellow card) 48'; Izzuddin (yellow card) 75' | Stadium: Petaling Jaya Stadium; Attendance: 1,360; Referee: Zamzaidi Katimin |

| 17 April 2021 9 | Perak | 1–1 | Kedah Darul Aman | Ipoh |
| 21:00 UTC+8 | de Paula 58'; Izzuddin (yellow card) 35'; Kenny (yellow card) 52' | Report | Sherman 78', (yellow card) 22'; Baddrol (yellow card) 90+2' | Stadium: Perak Stadium; Attendance: 1,323; Referee: Suhaimi Mat Hassan |

| 25 April 2021 10 | Perak | 0–1 | Melaka United | Ipoh |
| 22:00 UTC+8 | Idris (yellow card) 44'; Danish (yellow card) 65'; Shakir (yellow card) 84' | Report | Zaharulnizam 61'; Kumaahran (yellow card) 25'; Afiq (yellow card) 58'; Norde (yellow card) 87' | Stadium: Perak Stadium; Attendance: 693; Referee: Razlan Joffri Ali |

| 2 May 2021 11 | Sabah | 2–1 | Perak | Kota Kinabalu |
| 21:15 UTC+8 | Amri 65'; Madinda 79' | Report | Nazirul 27' | Stadium: Likas Stadium; Attendance: 1,741; Referee: Mohd Nafeez Abd Wahab |

| 5 May 2021 12 | Petaling Jaya City | 0–1 | Perak | Petaling Jaya |
| 22:00 UTC+8 | Manimaran (yellow card) 65'; Kannan (yellow card) 70'; Khyril (yellow card) 84' | Report | Agüero 26', (yellow card) 65'; Amirul (yellow card) 89' | Stadium: MBPJ Stadium; Attendance: 153; Referee: Muhammad Usaid Jamal |

| 9 May 2021 13 | Perak | 2–3 | Sri Pahang | Ipoh |
| 22:00 UTC+8 | Leandro 68' (pen.); Careca 90+5' | Report | Aung 34'; Athiu 58', 88' | Stadium: Perak Stadium; Attendance: 617; Referee: Mohd Fusser Mad Sallih |

| 24 July 2021 14 | Terengganu | 5–0 | Perak | Kuala Nerus |
| 21:00 UTC+8 | Faisal 19' da Silva 23' (pen.); Machell 42' (o.g.); Hakimi 71'; Nik Akif 90+5' (pen.) | Report | | Stadium: Sultan Mizan Zainal Abidin Stadium; Attendance: 0 Referee: Zuhaidi Dzulkifli |

| 27 July 2021 15 | Perak | 0–0 | Kuala Lumpur City | Ipoh |
| 21:00 UTC+8 | Poku (yellow card) 40'; Izzuddin (yellow card) 50' | Report | Irfan (yellow card) 13' | Stadium: Perak Stadium; Attendance: 0 Referee: Suhaizi Shukri |

| 31 July 2021 16 | Johor Darul Ta'zim | 5–0 | Perak | Iskandar Puteri |
| 21:00 UTC+8 | Bergson 20', 47', 59', (yellow card) 68'; Lowry (yellow card) 49'; Cabrera 83', 86' (pen.) | | Danish (yellow card) 50'; Zulkiffli (yellow card) 58'; Amirul (yellow card) 68' | Stadium: Sultan Ibrahim Stadium; Attendance: 0 Referee: Tuan Mohd Yaasin Tuan Mohd Hanafiah |

| 3 August 2021 17 | Perak | 3–5 | Penang | Ipoh |
| 21:00 UTC+8 | Poku 15', 36' (pen.), 58' (pen.); Amirul (yellow card) 30'; Idris (yellow card) 38'; Machell (yellow card) 41'; Farhan (yellow card) 87'; Agüero (yellow card) 90+1' | Report | Rafael Vitor 1', 8', 28'; Casagrande 21'; Rowley (yellow card) 55'; Azwan (yellow card) 64'; Azim 88', (yellow card) 90+3' | Stadium: Perak Stadium; Attendance: 0 Referee: Suhaimi Mat Hassan |

| 7 August 2021 18 | UiTM | 2–0 | Perak | Shah Alam |
| 21:00 UTC+8 | Giannelli 30'; Fauzi (yellow card) 70'; Shafiq 74'; Faizal (yellow card) 90+3' | Report | Danish (yellow card) 14'; Nazmi (yellow card) 56'; Amirul (yellow card) 75' | Stadium: UiTM Stadium; Attendance: 2 Referee: Suhaizi Shukri |

| 21 August 2021 19 | Perak | 0–3 | Selangor | Ipoh |
| 21:00 UTC+8 | Danish (yellow card) 58'; Noureddine (yellow card) 58' | Report | Dinesh (yellow card) 6'; Buff 42'; Ifedayo 45+2', 60'; Sharul (yellow card) 50' | Stadium: Perak Stadium; Attendance: 0 Referee: Ahmad Dzuhaidi Zulkifli |

| 28 August 2021 20 | Kedah Darul Aman | 1–0 | Perak | Alor Setar |
| 21:00 UTC+8 | Sherman (yellow card) 17', (goal) 20' | Report | Nazmi (yellow card) 33' | Stadium: Darul Aman Stadium; Attendance: 0 Referee: Razlan Joffri Ali |

| 3 September 2021 21 | Melaka United | 2–1 | Perak | Krubong |
| 21:00 UTC+8 | Khairul (yellow card) 27'; Ott 67'; Norde 79'; Faizal (yellow card) 88'; Fahmi (yellow card) 90+3' | Report | Agüero 30' (pen.), (yellow card) 73'; Nazmi (yellow card) 62'; Noureddine (yellow card) 69'; Aizat (yellow card) 90+2' | Stadium: Hang Jebat Stadium; Attendance: 0 Referee: Ahmad Zuhaidi Dzulkifli |

| 12 September 2021 22 | Perak | 2–1 | Sabah | Ipoh |
| 21:00 UTC+8 | Poku 20', 70'; Machell (yellow card) 51' | Report | Hamran (yellow card) 56'; Park 85'; Thanabalan (yellow card) 86' | Stadium: Perak Stadium; Attendance: 0 Referee: Abdul Rahman Wahab |

=== Malaysia Cup ===
==== Group stage ====
The draw for the group stage was held on 15 September 2021.

| Pos | Team | Pld | W | D | L | GF | GA | GD | Pts | Qualification | TER | SEL | KUC | PRK |
|---|---|---|---|---|---|---|---|---|---|---|---|---|---|---|
| 1 | Terengganu | 6 | 5 | 1 | 0 | 16 | 4 | +12 | 16 | Quarter-finals | — | 2–1 | 2–0 | 4–0 |
| 2 | Selangor | 6 | 4 | 0 | 2 | 12 | 8 | +4 | 12 | Quarter-finals | 1–3 | — | 5–1 | 1–0 |
| 3 | Kuching City | 6 | 1 | 2 | 3 | 6 | 12 | −6 | 5 | | 1–1 | 1–2 | — | 2–2 |
| 4 | Perak | 6 | 0 | 1 | 5 | 4 | 14 | −10 | 1 | | 1–4 | 1–2 | 0–1 | — |

Source: MFL, FAM

| 26 September 2021 1 | Selangor | 1–0 | Perak | Petaling Jaya |
| 21:00 UTC +8 | Olusegun 80' (pen.); Ayimbila (yellow card) 44'; Khairulazhan (yellow card) 90+3'; Harith (yellow card) 90+4' | | Izzuddin (yellow card) 34'; Zulkiffli (yellow card) 90+4' | Stadium: MBPJ Stadium; Attendance: 0 Referee: Noor Azriel Baharudin |

| 29 September 2021 2 | Kuching City | 2–2 | Perak | Pasir Gudang |
| 21:00 UTC +8 | Hudson 9'; Alif 67' | Report | Adib 49' (pen.); Aizat 70' | Stadium: Pasir Gudang Corporation Stadium; Attendance: 0 Referee: Muhammad Usaid Jamal |

| 30 October 2021 3 | Perak | 1–4 | Terengganu | Ipoh |
| 21:00 UTC +8 | Danish (yellow card) 19'; Agüero 24' (pen.) | Report | Faisal 9'; Danish 47' (o.g.); Lee Tuck 54', 83'; de Murga (yellow card) 65' | Stadium: Perak Stadium; Attendance: 1,248; Referee: Mohd Fusser Mad Sallih |

| 3 November 2021 4 | Terengganu | 4–0 | Perak | Kuala Nerus |
| 21:00 UTC +8 | | Report | | Stadium: Sultan Mizan Zainal Abidin Stadium; Attendance: 4,200; Referee: Mohd Hasrol Mohd Amir |

| 7 November 2021 5 | Perak | 0–1 | Kuching | Ipoh |
| 21:00 UTC +8 | | Report | | Stadium: Perak Stadium; Attendance: 230; Referee: Mohd Faisal Ridzuan |

| 6 | v |
| 21:00 UTC +8 |

== Statistics ==
=== Appearances and goals ===
As of match played 4 November 2021

| No. | Pos. | Player | League | | Malaysia Cup | | Total | |
| No. | Pos. | Player | Apps | Goals | Apps | Goals | Apps | Goals |
|---|---|---|---|---|---|---|---|---|
| 1 | GK | (Malaysia) Nasrullah Aziz | 1 | 0 | 0 | 0 | 1 | 0 |
| 2 | DF | (Malaysia) Danish Haziq | 13+3 | 0 | 3 | 0 | 19 | 0 |
| 4 | DF | (England) Charlie Machell | 7 | 0 | 4 | 0 | 11 | 0 |
| 5 | MF | (Lebanon) Jad Noureddine | 4 | 0 | 4 | 0 | 8 | 0 |
| 6 | DF | (Malaysia) Izaaq Izhan | 0+1 | 0 | 1+1 | 0 | 3 | 0 |
| 7 | FW | (Ghana) Nana Poku | 9+1 | 5 | 2 | 0 | 12 | 5 |
| 9 | FW | (Argentina) Ezequiel Agüero | 13+2 | 2 | 2 | 1 | 17 | 3 |
| 12 | DF | (Malaysia) Azhar Apandi | 0+1 | 0 | 0 | 0 | 1 | 0 |
| 14 | MF | (Malaysia) Firdaus Saiyadi | 8+7 | 0 | 4 | 0 | 19 | 0 |
| 15 | DF | (Malaysia) Idris Ahmad | 16+3 | 0 | 2 | 0 | 21 | 0 |
| 17 | DF | (Indonesia) Zoubairou Garba | 0+1 | 0 | 0 | 0 | 1 | 0 |
| 19 | MF | (Malaysia) Farid Khazali | 4+6 | 1 | 0+2 | 0 | 12 | 1 |
| 20 | DF | (Malaysia) Rafiuddin Roddin | 13+8 | 0 | 1+2 | 0 | 24 | 0 |
| 21 | MF | (Lebanon) Samir Ayass | 1+2 | 0 | 0 | 0 | 3 | 0 |
| 22 | MF | (Malaysia) Zulkiffli Zakaria | 1+9 | 0 | 0+2 | 0 | 11 | 0 |
| 23 | DF | (Malaysia) Amirul Azhan | 14+2 | 0 | 3+1 | 0 | 19 | 0 |
| 24 | FW | (Malaysia) of Zikri | 0 | 0 | 0+1 | 0 | 1 | 0 |
| 25 | DF | (Malaysia) Pavithran Selladoria | 0+4 | 0 | 0 | 0 | 4 | 0 |
| 28 | GK | (Malaysia) Hafizul Hakim | 14 | 0 | 2 | 0 | 16 | 0 |
| 29 | MF | (Malaysia) Farhan Roslan | 3+5 | 1 | 0 | 0 | 8 | 1 |
| 30 | GK | (Malaysia) Azri Ghani | 7 | 0 | 2 | 0 | 9 | 0 |
| 33 | DF | (Malaysia) Nazmi Ahmad | 4 | 0 | 2+1 | 0 | 7 | 0 |
| 39 | MF | (Malaysia) Royizzat Daud | 0 | 0 | 1+2 | 0 | 3 | 0 |
| 43 | FW | (Malaysia) Syahir Bashah | 5+4 | 0 | 3+1 | 0 | 13 | 0 |
| 75 | FW | (Ivory Coast) Ghislain Guessan | 1+1 | 0 | 0 | 0 | 2 | 0 |
| 77 | DF | (Malaysia) Adib Raop | 9+9 | 0 | 2+2 | 1 | 21 | 1 |
| 80 | DF | (Malaysia) Khairul Syafiq | 0 | 0 | 0+3 | 0 | 3 | 0 |
| 82 | MF | (Malaysia) Amier Ali | 0+1 | 0 | 0 | 0 | 1 | 0 |
| 88 | MF | (Malaysia) Izzuddin Roslan | 15+3 | 0 | 3 | 0 | 21 | 0 |
| 93 | MF | (Malaysia) Aizat Safuan | 0+7 | 0 | 3+1 | 1 | 11 | 1 |
Players away from the club on loan:
| 21 | DF | (Malaysia) Nazirul Naim | 7+3 | 1 | 0 | 0 | 10 | 1 |
Players who appeared for Perak no longer at the club:
| 3 | DF | (Malaysia) Shahrul Saad | 8 | 0 | 0 | 0 | 8 | 0 |
| 8 | MF | (Brazil) Leandro | 12 | 1 | 0 | 0 | 12 | 1 |
| 10 | MF | (Brazil) Careca | 11+1 | 4 | 0 | 0 | 12 | 4 |
| 11 | DF | (Singapore) Shakir Hamzah | 13 | 0 | 0 | 0 | 13 | 0 |
| 12 | MF | (Malaysia) Kenny Pallraj | 10+1 | 0 | 0 | 0 | 11 | 0 |
| 13 | FW | (Malaysia) Guilherme | 11+1 | 4 | 0 | 0 | 12 | 4 |
| 16 | MF | (Malaysia) Partiban Janasekaran | 8+2 | 1 | 0 | 0 | 10 | 1 |
