= 2021 Perak F.C. II season =

Perak II
2021 season
- Head coach: Syamsul Saad
- Stadium: Perak Stadium
- Malaysia Premier League: 10th (relegated) ▼
- Top goalscorer: Zulkiffli Zakaria; Adib Raop; Royizzat Daud (2)
- Highest home attendance: 0
- Lowest home attendance: 0
- Average home league attendance: 0

Perak F.C. II played the 2021 season in the Malaysia Premier League.

== Events ==
On 1 May 2021, Azman Noh has been appointed as club's team manager.

On 30 May 2021, club's team manager, Azman Noh tendered his resignation effective 1 June 2021.

On 16 July 2021, the club draw 1–1 against Kelantan in a league match.

On 28 July 2021, the club has lost 0–4 against Kelantan United during league match.

On 4 August 2021, the club suffered 2-0 lost against Johor Darul Ta'zim II in a league match.

On 15 August 2021, the club has been defeated 1–4 to Sarawak United.

On 22 August 2021, the club has been defeated 0–3 in league match.

== Competitions ==
=== Malaysia Premier League ===
==== League table ====
Pos	Team	Pld	W	D	L	GF	GA	GD	Pts	Qualification or relegation
7	Kelantan United	20	8	2	10	25	28	−3	26	Qualification for the Malaysia Cup group stage
8	PDRM	20	7	5	8	22	25	−3	26	
9	Selangor II (Note: Johor Darul Ta'zim II, Perak II, Selangor II and Terengganu II cannot be promoted from Malaysia Premier League and play in Malaysia Cup as Johor Darul Ta'zim F.C., Perak FA, Selangor F.C. and Terengganu FC (their parent clubs) remain in Malaysia Super League and play in Malaysia Cup. Should the team be relegated to Malaysia Premier League or will not play in Malaysia Cup, Johor Darul Ta'zim II, Perak II, Selangor II and Terengganu II will have to drop to Malaysia M3 League or will play in Malaysia Cup.)	20	5	9	6	27	26	+1	24	
10	Perak II (R)	20	4	5	11	14	37	−23	17	
11	FAM-MSN Project (Note: FAM-MSN Project is only as a back-up squad and will not promote to Super League.)	20	1	3	16	12	56	−44	6	

Source: MFL
Rules for classification: 1) Points; 2) Goal difference; 3) Number of goals scored.
(R) Relegated

== Squad statistics ==
As of match played 21 September 2021

No.	Pos.	Player	League		Total	
No.	Pos.	Player	Apps	Goals	Apps	Goals
1	GK	(Malaysia) Yuganes Ganassan	9	0	9	0
3	DF	(Malaysia) Azhar Apandi	1	0	1	0
4	DF	(Malaysia) Syafiq Izzuddin	5+2	0	7	0
5	DF	(Malaysia) Nazmi Ahmad	7+2	1	9	1
7	MF	(Malaysia) Aizat Safuan	13+4	1	17	1
8	FW	(Malaysia) Adam Nadzmi	5+8	1	13	1
9	FW	(Malaysia) Hakimi Mat Isa	4+9	1	13	1
10	FW	(Argentina) Ezequiel Agüero	3+1	0	4	0
12	FW	(Malaysia) Alif Zikri	5+9	1	14	1
14	DF	(Malaysia) Nasrol Amri	13+4	0	17	0
17	FW	(Malaysia) Aqil Hilman	5+9	1	14	1
18	DF	(Malaysia) Pavithran Selladoria	2	0	2	0
19	MF	(Malaysia) Royizzat Daud	12+4	2	16	2
20	MF	(Malaysia) Farhan Roslan	1	0	1	0
21	FW	(Malaysia) Syahir Bashah	8+1	0	9	0
22	DF	(Malaysia) Amirul Ashraf	3+1	0	4	0
23	DF	(Malaysia) Nazirul Afif	6+5	0	11	0
24	MF	(Malaysia) Farid Khazali	5+1	1	6	1
28	DF	(Malaysia) Amier Ali	12+5	0	17	0
29	DF	(Malaysia) Izaaq Izhan	6+1	0	7	0
30	MF	(Malaysia) Aidril Faqir	4+3	0	7	0
31	MF	(Malaysia) Akmal Hazim	7+3	0	10	0
33	MF	(Malaysia) Khairul Syafiq	11+5	1	16	1
35	GK	(Malaysia) Syazwan Syazani	4	0	4	0
41	MF	(Malaysia) Firdaus Saiyadi	2	0	2	0
43	MF	(Malaysia) Khairul Amizan	2	0	2	0
44	GK	(Malaysia) Azri Ghani	1	0	1	0
46	DF	(Malaysia) Akmal Rizal	14+2	0	16	0
47	FW	(Malaysia) Zulkiffli Zakaria	4	2	4	2
55	DF	(Malaysia) Borhan Rahaman	12+1	0	13	0
66	DF	(Malaysia) Izzat Ramlee	10+5	0	15	0
69	DF	(Malaysia) Aiman Khairul	6+7	0	13	0
77	MF	(Malaysia) Izzuddin Roslan	2+1	0	3	0
88	MF	(Malaysia) Adib Raop	4	2	4	2
92	FW	(France) Ghislain Guessan	5+1	0	6	0
93	DF	(Malaysia) Shahrul Saad	1	0	1	0
99	GK	(Malaysia) Farhan Majid	6	0	6	0
