= 2019 Piala Sumbangsih =

Johor Darul Ta'zim	Perak
1	0
- Date: 2 February 2019
- Venue: Larkin Stadium, Johor Bahru
- Referee: Zulkarnain Zakaria

The 2019 Piala Sumbangsih was the 34th edition of the Piala Sumbangsih, an annual football match played between the winners of the previous season's Malaysia Super League and Malaysia Cup. The game was played between the Johor Darul Ta'zim F.C., champions of the 2018 Malaysia Super League, and Perak, winners of the 2018 Malaysia Cup.

== Match details ==
2 February 2019
21:00 UTC+8

Johor Darul Ta'zim	1–0	Perak
Cabrera 40'

Larkin Stadium, Johor Bahru, Johor
Referee: Zulkarnain Zakaria

GK	1	Farizal Marlias
DF	22	La'Vere Corbin-Ong
DF	3	Adam Nor Azlin
DF	33	Maurício
DF	20	Azrif Nasrulhaq	(yellow card) 68'
MF	5	Natxo Insa		(substituted off) 36'
MF	14	Hariss Harun
MF	17	Aarón Ñíguez
FW	11	Gonzalo Cabrera		(substituted off) 90+2'
FW	10	Safawi Rasid
FW	28	Syafiq Ahmad		(substituted off) 79'
Substitutes:
GK	24	Izham Tarmizi
DF	7	Aidil Zafuan
DF	12	S. Kunanlan
MF	4	Mohd Afiq Fazail		(substituted on) 36'
FW	8	Diogo		(substituted on) 79'
FW	9	Hazwan Bakri
FW	19	Akhyar Rashid		(substituted on) 90+2'
Coach:
Luciano Figueroa

GK	22	Hafizul Hakim
DF	23	Amirul Azhan	(yellow card) 82'
DF	6	Zac Anderson
DF	3	Shahrul Saad	(yellow card) 56'
DF	21	Nazirul Naim
MF	12	Kenny Pallraj		(substituted off) 42'
MF	8	Leandro
MF	11	Brendan Gan	(yellow card) 87'
MF	19	Nor Hakim		(substituted off) 78'
FW	10	Wander Luiz
FW	14	Firdaus Saiyadi		(substituted off) 66'
Substitutes:
GK	18	Khairul Amri
DF	2	Syazwan Zaipol
DF	15	Idris Ahmad
DF	20	Rafiuddin Roddin
MF	7	Khairil Anuar		(substituted on) 78'
MF	16	J. Partiban	(yellow card) 62'	(substituted on) 42'
FW	29	Shahrel Fikri		(substituted on) 66'
Coach:
Mehmet Duraković

Match officials

- Referee:
  - Zulkarnain Zakaria
- Assistant referees:
  - Mohd Khalid Mohd Aris
  - Mohd Hariff Akhir
- Fourth official:
  - Azizul Aziz

== Winners ==
2019 Piala Sumbangsih

Johor Darul Ta'zim
Fourth title
