= 2022 Perak F.C. season =

Perak
2022 season
- Owner: XOX Berhad
- CEO: Bobie Farid Shamuddin
- Head coach: Yusri Che Lah
- Stadium: Perak Stadium
- Malaysia Premier League: 9th (promoted)
- Malaysia FA Cup: Second round
- Malaysia Cup: DNQ
- Top goalscorer: League: Five players (2); All: Hakimi Mat Isa (3)
Home colours	Away colours

The 2022 season was the 102nd season in the history of Perak and their 1st season in the Malaysia Premier League. The club are participating in the Malaysia Premier League and Malaysia FA Cup.

On 26 February 2022, the club announced players for the 2022 season.

== Players ==
=== Squad ===
As of 11 February 2023

Note: Flags indicate national team as defined under FIFA eligibility rules; some limited exceptions apply. Players may hold more than one non-FIFA nationality.

No.	Pos.	Nation	Player
1	GK	(Malaysia) MAS	Nasrullah Aziz
2	MF	(Nigeria) NGA	Sunday Afolabi
3	DF	(Malaysia) MAS	Danish Haziq
4	DF	(Malaysia) MAS	Farid Nezal
5	MF	(Argentina) ARG	Luciano Guaycochea
6	MF	(Malaysia) MAS	Khairul Asyraf Sahizah
7	FW	(Malaysia) MAS	Ferris Danial
8	DF	(Malaysia) MAS	Pavithran Selladoria
9	MF	(Malaysia) MAS	Hakimi Mat Isa
10	MF	(Malaysia) MAS	Aqil Hilman
11	MF	(Malaysia) MAS	Syamim Yahya
12	DF	(Malaysia) MAS	Afif Asyraf
14	FW	(Malaysia) MAS	Firdaus Saiyadi (captain)
15	DF	(Malaysia) MAS	Idris Ahmad
17	MF	(Malaysia) MAS	Khairul Syafiq
18	GK	(Malaysia) MAS	Zamir Selamat

No.	Pos.	Nation	Player
21	DF	(Malaysia) MAS	Kamal Arif
23	FW	(Malaysia) MAS	Indra Putra
24	MF	(Malaysia) MAS	Farid Khazali
25	MF	(Malaysia) MAS	Hafiz Ramdan
28	FW	(Malaysia) MAS	Alif Zikri
30	MF	(Malaysia) MAS	Aidril Faqir
31	MF	(Malaysia) MAS	Wan Zack Haikal
32	GK	(Malaysia) MAS	Yuganes Ganassan
34	GK	(Malaysia) MAS	Syazwan Syazany
39	FW	(Malaysia) MAS	Royizzat Daud
41	DF	(Malaysia) MAS	Nasrol Amri
50	DF	(Malaysia) MAS	Randy Baruh (on loan from Sabah)
55	DF	(Malaysia) MAS	Borhan Rahaman
88	DF	(Malaysia) MAS	Aiman Khairul Yusni
89	FW	(Croatia) CRO	Stipe Plazibat

=== Transfers in ===
Mid-season Note: Flags indicate national team as defined under FIFA eligibility rules; some limited exceptions apply. Players may hold more than one non-FIFA nationality.

No.	Pos.	Nation	Player
2	MF	(Nigeria) NGA	Sunday Afolabi
4	DF	(Malaysia) MAS	Farid Nezal
5	MF	(Argentina) ARG	Luciano Guaycochea
7	FW	(Malaysia) MAS	Ferris Danial
11	MF	(Malaysia) MAS	Syamim Yahya
12	DF	(Malaysia) MAS	Afif Asyraf
18	GK	(Malaysia) MAS	Zamir Selamat
23	FW	(Malaysia) MAS	Indra Putra
31	MF	(Malaysia) MAS	Wan Zack Haikal
89	FW	(Croatia) CRO	Stipe Plazibat

=== Transfers out ===
Mid-season Note: Flags indicate national team as defined under FIFA eligibility rules; some limited exceptions apply. Players may hold more than one non-FIFA nationality.

No.	Pos.	Nation	Player
1	GK	(Malaysia) MAS	Nasrullah Aziz
16	MF	(Malaysia) MAS	Akmal Hazim
33	DF	(Malaysia) MAS	Nazmi Ahmad
34	GK	(Malaysia) MAS	Syazwan Syazany

== Competitions ==
Win Draw Loss Cancelled Fixtures

=== Malaysia Premier League ===
Pos	Team	Pld	W	D	L	GF	GA	GD	Pts	Qualification or relegation
6	PDRM	18	6	3	9	20	28	−8	21	Promotion to 2023 Super League and Qualification to 2022 Malaysia Cup
7	UiTM (D)	18	6	2	10	18	25	−7	20	Withdrawn from Liga Super and relegated to 2023 Malaysia M4 League (Note: UiTM FC withdrew from Liga Super before the start of 2023 season.)
8	Selangor II (Note: Johor Darul Ta'zim II, Selangor II, and Terengganu II aren't eligible to promote as their parent clubs (Johor Darul Ta'zim, Selangor, and Terengganu) play in the Super League. These feeder teams can only play in leagues below their parents'. They also can't play in the Malaysian Cup as they're only eligible to play in the Malaysian Cup if their parents fail to do so (which is not possible currently).)	18	4	4	10	14	25	−11	16	Relocated to 2023 MFL Cup
9	Perak	18	5	2	11	16	30	−14	8 (Note: Perak have been deducted three points on 1st April for breaching the finances regulation. Later, six points more were deducted on 15th April following the failure to pay the players and officials salary one day before.)	Promotion to 2023 Super League
10	FAM-MSN Project (Note: FAM-MSN Project is only as a backup squad and will not promote to Super League.)	18	2	2	14	10	33	−23	8	Relocated to 2023 MFL Cup

Updated to match(es) played on 4 September 2022. Source: MFL
Rules for classification: 1) Points; 2) Goal difference; 3) Number of goals scored.
(D) Disqualified
Notes:

20 March 2022 1	Perak	1—3	PDRM
	Royizzat 13'

25 March 2022 2	Terengganu II	3—0	Perak

9 April 2022 3	Perak	2—1	Selangor II
	Farid 88', 90+3'

16 April 2022 4	Perak	1—3	Kelantan
	Nazmi 21'

23 April 2022 5	Perak	1—3	Johor Darul Ta'zim II
	Hakimi 38' (pen.)

27 April 2022 6	Perak	2—3	Kelantan United
	Aqil 4'; Nazmi 11'

11 May 2022 7	FAM-MSN Project	0—1	Perak
			Firdaus 63'

21 May 2022 8	Perak	0—2	UiTM

27 May 2022 9	Kuching City	2—1	Perak
			Hakimi 63' (pen.)

25 June 2022 10	Kelantan United	2—1	Perak
			Guaycochea 87'

3 July 2022 11	PDRM	2—0	Perak

16 July 2022 12	Perak	0—0	Terengganu II

26 July 2022 13	Selangor II	0—1	Perak
			Ferris 77'

10 August 2022 14	Kelantan	1—2	Perak
			Wan Zack 14'; Helmi 20' (o.g.)

13 August 2022 15	Johor Darul Ta'zim II	1—0	Perak

21 August 2022 16	Perak	1—3	FAM-MSN Project

3 September 2022 17	UiTM	2—1	Perak
			Wan Zack 35'

17 September 2022 18	Perak	1—1	Kuching City
	Guaycochea 86'

=== Malaysia FA Cup ===
31 March 2022 First round	Perak	1—0 (a.e.t.)	Kijang Rangers
	Hakimi 101'

14 May 2022 Second round	Perak	1—4	Penang
	Aqil 69'

== Statistics ==
=== Appearances and goals ===
No.	Pos	Nat	Player	Total		League		FA Cup	
No.	Pos	Nat	Player	Apps	Goals	Apps	Goals	Apps	Goals
1	GK	(Malaysia) MAS	Syazwan Syazany	1	0	1	0	0	0
2	MF	(Nigeria) NGA	Sunday Afolabi	8	0	8	0	0	0
3	DF	(Malaysia) MAS	Danish Haziq	3	0	2+1	0	0	0
4	DF	(Malaysia) MAS	Farid Nezal	5	0	5	0	0	0
5	MF	(Argentina) ARG	Luciano Guaycochea	7	2	6+1	2	0	0
6	DF	(Malaysia) MAS	Khairul Asyraf	5	0	2+3	0	0	0
7	FW	(Malaysia) MAS	Ferris Danial	7	1	2+5	1	0	0
8	DF	(Malaysia) MAS	Pavithran Selladoria	16	0	13+1	0	2	0
9	FW	(Malaysia) MAS	Hakimi Mat Isa	19	3	13+4	2	2	1
10	FW	(Malaysia) MAS	Aqil Hilman	17	2	9+6	1	2	1
11	MF	(Malaysia) MAS	Syamim Yahya	8	0	6+2	0	0	0
12	DF	(Malaysia) MAS	Afif Asyraf	8	0	8	0	0	0
14	FW	(Malaysia) MAS	Firdaus Saiyadi	17	1	11+4	1	2	0
15	DF	(Malaysia) MAS	Idris Ahmad	10	0	8	0	1+1	0
16	MF	(Malaysia) MAS	Akmal Hazim	12	0	7+3	0	2	0
17	MF	(Malaysia) MAS	Khairul Syafiq	9	0	5+3	0	1	0
18	GK	(Malaysia) MAS	Zamir Selamat	6	0	6	0	0	0
21	DF	(Malaysia) MAS	Kamal Arif	8	0	7+1	0	0	0
22	GK	(Malaysia) MAS	Farhan Majid	4	0	3+1	0	0	0
23	MF	(Malaysia) MAS	Indra Putra	9	0	4+5	0	0	0
24	MF	(Malaysia) MAS	Farid Khazali	9	2	4+4	2	0+1	0
25	MF	(Malaysia) MAS	Hafiz Ramdan	3	0	2+1	0	0	0
28	DF	(Malaysia) MAS	Alif Zikri	12	0	5+5	0	0+2	0
30	MF	(Malaysia) MAS	Aidril Faqir	5	0	2+2	0	0+1	0
31	MF	(Malaysia) MAS	Wan Zack Haikal	8	2	6+2	2	0	0
32	GK	(Malaysia) MAS	Yuganes Ganassan	9	0	7	0	1+1	0
33	DF	(Malaysia) MAS	Nazmi Ahmad	9	2	5+2	2	2	0
34	GK	(Malaysia) MAS	Syazwan Syazany	2	0	1	0	1	0
39	MF	(Malaysia) MAS	Royizzat Daud	10	1	7+1	1	2	0
41	DF	(Malaysia) MAS	Nasrol Amri	14	0	10+2	0	2	0
50	DF	(Malaysia) MAS	Randy Baruh	7	0	7	0	0	0
55	DF	(Malaysia) MAS	Borhan Abdul Rahaman	6	0	4+1	0	0+1	0
88	DF	(Malaysia) MAS	Aiman Yusni	15	0	8+5	0	2	0
89	MF	(Croatia) CRO	Stipe Plazibat	7	1	4+3	1	0	0
Players sold or loaned out after the start of the season:

Last updated: 17 September 2022
Source: Competitive matches
