= 2020 Perak FA season =

Perak
2020 season
- President: Ahmad Faizal Azumu
- Manager: Adly Shah Ahmad Tah
- Head coach: Mehmet Duraković
- Stadium: Perak Stadium
- Malaysia Super League: 4th
- Malaysia FA Cup: Cancelled
- Malaysia Cup: Cancelled
- Top goalscorer: League: Shahrel Fikri (10 goals); All: Shahrel Fikri (10 goals)
Home colours	Away colours

The 2020 season was Perak's 17th consecutive season in Malaysia Super League, the top flight of Malaysian football.

== Players ==
=== Current squad ===
Note: Flags indicate national team as defined under FIFA eligibility rules; some limited exceptions apply. Players may hold more than one non-FIFA nationality.

No.	Pos.	Nation	Player
1	GK	(Malaysia) MAS	Nasrullah Aziz
3	DF	(Malaysia) MAS	Shahrul Saad (captain)
5	DF	(Australia) AUS	Antony Golec
8	MF	(Brazil) BRA	Leandro
10	MF	(Brazil) BRA	Careca
12	MF	(Malaysia) MAS	Kenny Pallraj
13	FW	(Brazil) BRA	Guilherme De Paula
14	MF	(Malaysia) MAS	Firdaus Saiyadi
15	DF	(Malaysia) MAS	Idris Ahmad
16	MF	(Malaysia) MAS	Partiban Janasekaran
18	GK	(Malaysia) MAS	Khairul Amri Salehuddin
20	DF	(Malaysia) MAS	Rafiuddin Roddin
21	DF	(Malaysia) MAS	Nazirul Naim

No.	Pos.	Nation	Player
22	GK	(Malaysia) MAS	Hafizul Hakim (3rd-captain)
23	DF	(Malaysia) MAS	Amirul Azhan
24	DF	(Malaysia) MAS	Shathiya Kandasamy
25	MF	(Malaysia) MAS	Hafiz Ramdan
26	DF	(Malaysia) MAS	Izzat Ramlee
27	DF	(Malaysia) MAS	Nazirul Afif
28	DF	(Malaysia) MAS	Nazmi Ahmad
31	MF	(Malaysia) MAS	Farid Khazali
34	MF	(Malaysia) MAS	Khairul Amizan
35	MF	(Malaysia) MAS	Khairil Anuar
40	GK	(Australia) AUS	Yaren Sozer
93	MF	(Cambodia) CAM	Thierry Chantha Bin

== Statistics ==
As of match played 11 October 2020

=== Appearances and goals ===
No.	Pos	Nat	Player	Total		League	
No.	Pos	Nat	Player	Apps	Goals	Apps	Goals
1	GK	(Malaysia) MAS	Nasrullah Aziz	6	0	6	0
3	DF	(Malaysia) MAS	Shahrul Saad	10	2	10	2
5	DF	(Australia) AUS	Antony Golec	10	0	10	0
8	MF	(Brazil) BRA	Leandro	8	3	8	3
10	MF	(Brazil) BRA	Careca	6	0	5+1	0
12	MF	(Malaysia) MAS	Kenny Pallraj	10	0	7+3	0
13	FW	(Brazil) BRA	Guilherme	10	3	10	3
14	MF	(Malaysia) MAS	Firdaus Saiyadi	10	0	8+2	0
15	DF	(Malaysia) MAS	Idris Ahmad	7	0	3+4	0
16	MF	(Malaysia) MAS	Partiban Janasekaran	7	2	7	2
19	MF	(Malaysia) MAS	Shahrel Fikri	11	10	11	10
20	DF	(Malaysia) MAS	Rafiuddin Roddin	11	0	11	0
21	DF	(Malaysia) MAS	Nazirul Naim	5	0	1+4	0
22	GK	(Malaysia) MAS	Hafizul Hakim	5	0	5	0
23	DF	(Malaysia) MAS	Amirul Azhan	11	0	10+1	0
24	DF	(Malaysia) MAS	Shathiya Kandasamy	1	0	0+1	0
25	MF	(Malaysia) MAS	Hafiz Ramdan	7	0	2+5	0
31	MF	(Malaysia) MAS	Farid Khazali	7	0	1+6	0
35	MF	(Malaysia) MAS	Khairil Anuar	1	0	0+1	0
55	DF	(Malaysia) MAS	Adib Raop	5	0	0+5	0
93	MF	(Cambodia) CAM	Thierry Bin	8	1	6+2	1
96	MF	(Brazil) BRA	Bruno	2	0	0+2	0
Players away from the club on loan:
Players who left Perak during the season:

== Perak II ==
=== Squad statistics ===
As of match played 9 October 2020

No.	Pos	Nat	Player	Total		League	
No.	Pos	Nat	Player	Apps	Goals	Apps	Goals
2	MF	(Malaysia) MAS	Sukri Hamid	3	0	3	0
3	DF	(Malaysia) MAS	Johar Adli	1	0	1	0
4	DF	(Malaysia) MAS	Aliff Najmi	3	1	2+1	1
5	MF	(Malaysia) MAS	Muhammad Safar	4	0	4	0
6	MF	(France) FRA	Sacha Petshi	10	2	10	2
7	MF	(Malaysia) MAS	Syahir Bashah	9	0	5+4	0
8	FW	(Malaysia) MAS	Hamizul Izaidi	10	0	6+4	0
9	FW	(Malaysia) MAS	Alif Zikri	2	0	1+1	0
10	FW	(Brazil) BRA	Bruno	4	2	4	2
11	MF	(Malaysia) MAS	Khairullah Halim	9	0	3+6	0
12	FW	(Malaysia) MAS	Thanabalan Nadarajah	7	0	3+4	0
14	DF	(Malaysia) MAS	Pavithran Selladoria	10	0	10	0
16	DF	(Malaysia) MAS	Suwarnaraj Chinniah	3	0	2+1	0
19	GK	(Malaysia) MAS	Shafiq Afifi	2	0	2	0
20	FW	(Malaysia) MAS	Khairul Asyraf	10	1	8+2	1
23	GK	(Malaysia) MAS	Farhan Majid	6	0	5+1	0
24	DF	(Bosnia and Herzegovina) BIH	Tarik Isić	10	1	10	1
28	MF	(Malaysia) MAS	Nuriqmal Tumin	11	0	7+4	0
29	FW	(Malaysia) MAS	Razak Mastor	4	0	1+3	0
33	DF	(Malaysia) MAS	Nazmi Ahmad	5	1	5	1
38	MF	(Malaysia) MAS	Khairul Amizan	3	0	0+3	0
42	GK	(Malaysia) MAS	Syakir Danial	2	0	2	0
44	DF	(Malaysia) MAS	Syafiq Izzudin	5	0	5	0
46	MF	(Malaysia) MAS	Khairil Anuar	1	0	1	0
66	DF	(Malaysia) MAS	Nasrol Amri	7	0	7	0
76	DF	(Malaysia) MAS	Izzat Ramlee	4	0	2+2	0
77	DF	(Malaysia) MAS	Adib Raop	6	3	4+2	3
97	GK	(Turkey) TUR	Yaren Sözer	2	0	2	0
98	FW	(Malaysia) MAS	Yusof Abdullah	3	0	2+1	0
99	MF	(Malaysia) MAS	Khairul Syafiq	6	0	4+2	0
