= Amirul Azhan =

Malaysian footballer

Personal information
- Full name: Amirul Azhan bin Aznan
- Date of birth: 23 July 1993 (age 33)
- Place of birth: Ipoh, Perak, Malaysia
- Height: 1.68 m (5 ft 6 in)
- Positions: Right-back; winger

Team information
- Current team: Harini FT
- Number: 23

Youth career
- Bukit Jalil Sports School
- 2012–2015: Perak U21

Senior career*
Years	Team	Apps	(Gls)
2014–2021	Perak	100	(0)
2022	Kedah Darul Aman	7	(0)
2023–	Harini FT	1	(0)

International career^{‡}
2017–2018	Malaysia	4	(0)
Medal record
Men's football
Representing Malaysia
AFF Championship
Runner-up	2018
- * Club domestic league appearances and goals as of 11 March 2023 ‡ National team caps and goals as of 11 December 2018

Amirul Azhan bin Aznan (born 23 July 1993) is a Malaysian professional footballer who plays for Malaysia M3 League club Harini FT. He spent most of his career with Perak. Amirul plays mainly as a right-back but can also play as a winger.

== Club career ==
=== Perak ===
Amirul began his football career with Perak youth team before got promoted to the first team in 2014. He was part of the youth team which won the President Cup in 2012. Amirul made his Malaysia Super League debut for Perak in a 1–1 draw against PKNS on 8 March 2014. He became a regular in 2015 season and played 10 matches in all competition for Perak. In 2018, he won the Malaysia Cup with Perak after defeating Terengganu in the final.

=== Kedah Darul Aman ===
Amirul signed with Kedah on 7 December 2021. He made his debut on 12 March 2022 in the Malaysia FA Cup match against SAINS FC where Kedah won 4–0.

=== Harini FT ===
Amirul left Kedah after the 2022 season ended. He later signed with Harini FT. He made his debut in a 3–3 draw against Melaka FC coming in as a substitute in the 73 minutes.

== International ==
On 16 August 2017, Amirul received his first call-up to the Malaysia national team for the centralised training as a preparation for 2019 Asian Cup qualifiers Group B match against Hong Kong on 5 September 2017. Amirul made his debut for Malaysia coming off the bench against Myanmar in a 1–0 defeat on the friendly game on 30 August 2017. In 2018, Amirul was named in the final squad for the 2018 AFF Championship. He started in the first leg of the final against Vietnam where Malaysia were held 2-2.

== Career statistics ==
=== Club ===
As of match played 11 March 2023

Appearances and goals by club, season and competition
Club	Season	League			FA Cup		Malaysia Cup		Asia		Total	
Club	Season	Division	Apps	Goals	Apps	Goals	Apps	Goals	Apps	Goals	Apps	Goals
Perak	2014	Malaysia Super League	1	0	0	0	0	0	–		1	0
Perak	2015	Malaysia Super League	8	0	1	0	1	0	–		10	0
Perak	2016	Malaysia Super League	12	0	4	0	2	0	–		18	0
Perak	2017	Malaysia Super League	19	0	1	0	9	0	–		29	0
Perak	2018	Malaysia Super League	17	0	3	0	9	0	–		29	0
Perak	2019	Malaysia Super League	16	0	5	0	6	0	2 (Note: Appearances in AFC Champions League)	0	29	0
Perak	2020	Malaysia Super League	11	0	0	0	1	0	–		12	0
Perak	2021	Malaysia Super League	16	0	–		5	0	–		21	0
Perak	Total		100	0	14	0	33	0	2	0	149	0
Kedah Darul Aman	2022	Malaysia Super League	7	0	1	0	0	0	0	0	8	0
Kedah Darul Aman	Total		7	0	1	0	0	0	0	0	8	0
Harini FT	2023	Malaysia M3 League	1	0			–				1	0
Harini FT	Total		1	0			–				1	0
Career total			108	0	15	0	33	0	2	0	158	0

=== International ===
As of match played 11 December 2018

Appearances and goals by national team and year
National team	Year	Apps	Goals
Malaysia
Malaysia	2017	2	0
Malaysia	2018	2	0
Total		4	0

== Honours ==
=== Club ===
Perak

- Malaysia Cup: 2018
- Malaysia FA Cup runner up: 2019

=== International ===
Malaysia

- AFF Championship runner-up: 2018
