= Guilherme de Paula =

Malaysian footballer (born 1986)

Personal information
- Full name: Guilherme de Paula Lucrécio
- Date of birth: 9 November 1986 (age 40)
- Place of birth: São Paulo, Brazil
- Height: 1.85 m (6 ft 1 in)
- Position: Forward

Youth career
- –2004: São Paulo

Senior career*
Years	Team	Apps	(Gls)
2005	Coritiba	0	(0)
2006–2008	Rio Claro	2	(0)
2008–2010	Brasa	9	(1)
2010	Vitória de Setúbal	3	(0)
2011	Halcones	33	(12)
2011	Juventud Retalteca	11	(1)
2012	Toledo	13	(2)
2012–2014	Milsami Orhei	50	(15)
2015	Selangor	19	(8)
2016	Ethnikos Achna	10	(1)
2016	PDRM	9	(4)
2017–2019	Kuala Lumpur	57	(48)
2020–2021	Perak	22	(7)
2021–2023	Johor Darul Ta'zim	3	(0)

International career^{‡}
2015	Malaysia XI	1	(0)
2021–2022	Malaysia	13	(2)
- * Club domestic league appearances and goals as of 21 May 2023 ‡ National team caps and goals as of 14 June 2022

Guilherme de Paula Lucrécio (born 9 November 1986) is a professional footballer who last played as a forward who plays for Liga M3 club Melaka. Born in Brazil, he represented the Malaysia national team.

== International career ==
He played once for Malaysia XI against Tottenham Hotspur F.C. In December 2019, De Paula has agreed to join Perak FC for the 2020 season. On 3 June 2021, he won his first cap for Malaysia in a 2022 FIFA World Cup qualification match against the United Arab Emirates.

== Career statistics ==
=== Club ===
As of 21 May 2023

Club	Season	League		Cup (Note: The Malaysia FA Cup)		League Cup (Note: The Malaysia Cup and Malaysia Challenge Cup)		Continental		Total	
Club	Season	Apps	Goals	Apps	Goals	Apps	Goals	Apps	Goals	Apps	Goals
Selangor	2015	19	8	2	2	11	3	–		32	13
Ethnikos Achna	2015–16	10	1	0	0	0	0	–		10	1
PDRM FC	2016	9	4	0	0	10	7	–		19	11
Kuala Lumpur	2017	22	27	1	0	4	3	–		27	30
Kuala Lumpur	2018	19	13	3	4	6	8	–		28	25
Kuala Lumpur	2019	16	8	4	3	1	0	–		21	11
Total		57	48	8	7	11	11	0	0	76	66
Perak	2020	10	3	0	0	0	0	–		10	3
Perak	2021	12	4	0	0	0	0	–		12	4
Total		22	7	0	0	0	0	0	0	22	7
Johor Darul Ta'zim	2021	3	0	0	0	0	0	–		3	0
Johor Darul Ta'zim	2022	0	0	0	0	0	0	–		0	0
Total		3	0	0	0	0	0	0	0	3	0
Melaka (loan)	2023	6	3	0	0	0	0	–		6	3
Career total		126	71	10	9	32	21	0	0	168	101

=== International ===
As of 14 June 2022

Appearances and goals by national team and year
National team	Year	Apps	Goals
Malaysia	2021	9	1
Malaysia	2022	4	1
Total		13	2

==== International goals ====
As of match played 8 June 2022. Malaysia score listed first, score column indicates score after each goal.

International goals by date, venue, cap, opponent, score, result and competition
No.	Date	Venue	Cap	Opponent	Score	Result	Competition
1	11 June 2021	Al Maktoum Stadium, Dubai	2	Vietnam	1–1	1–2	2022 FIFA World Cup qualification
2	27 May 2022	Bukit Jalil National Stadium, Kuala Lumpur	10	Brunei	4–0	4–0	Friendly

== Honours ==
Selangor

- Malaysia Cup: 2015

Kuala Lumpur

- Malaysia Premier League: 2017

Johor Darul Ta'zim

- Malaysia Super League: 2021

Individual

- Malaysia Cup Golden Boot: 2016
- Malaysia Premier League Golden Boot: 2017
- FAM Football Awards Best Forward Award: 2017
