= Hafizul Hakim =

Malaysian footballer

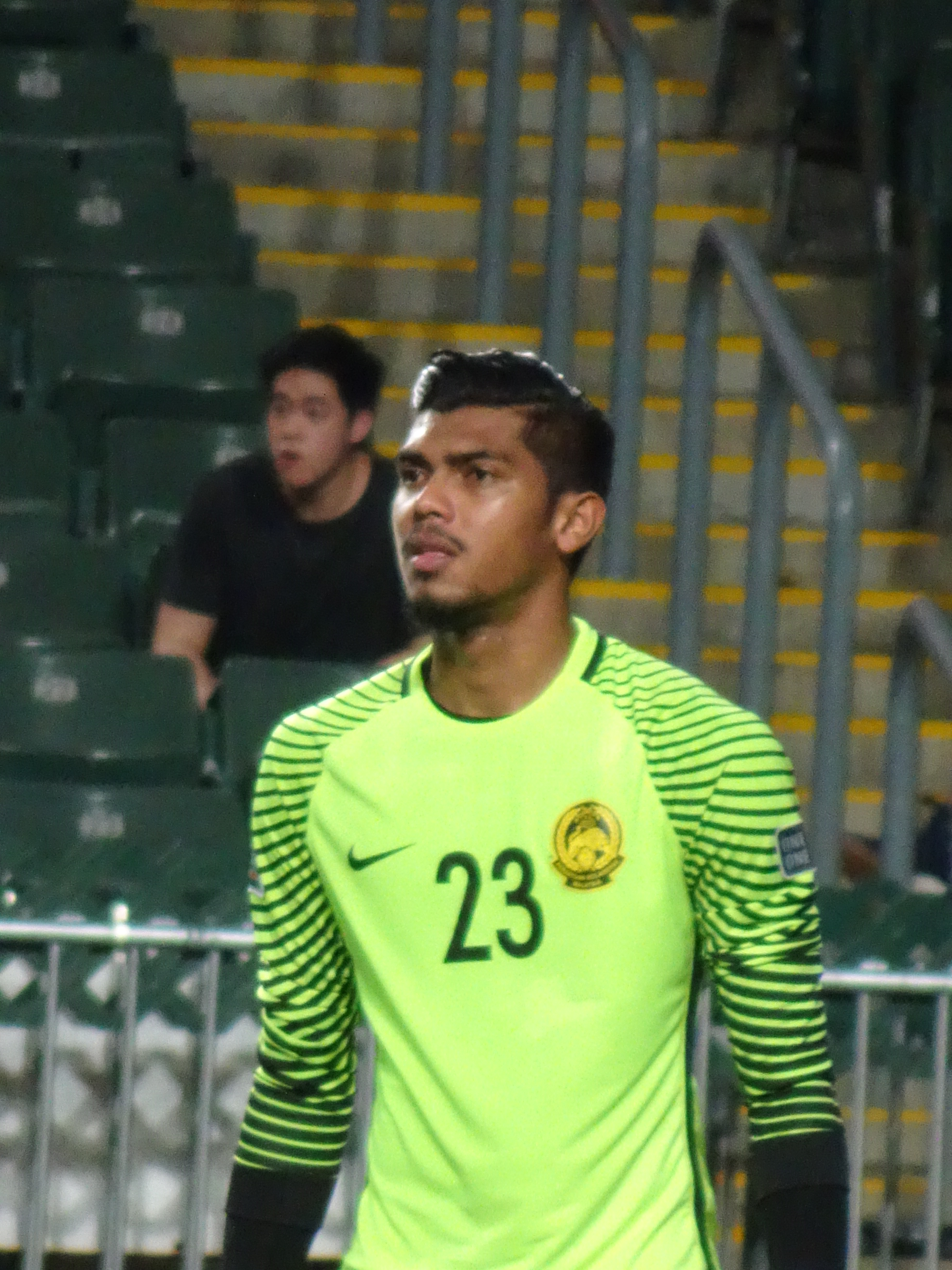
- Hakim lining up for Malaysia in 2017

Personal information
- Full name: Muhammad Hafizul Hakim bin Khairul Nizam Jothy
- Date of birth: 30 March 1993 (age 33)
- Place of birth: Ipoh, Perak, Malaysia
- Height: 1.85 m (6 ft 1 in)
- Position: Goalkeeper

Team information
- Current team: Star City F.C.
- Number: 23

Youth career
- 2010–2012: Perak U21
- 2013: Harimau Muda B
- 2014: Perak U21

Senior career*
Years	Team	Apps	(Gls)
2015	Melaka United	1	(0)
2016–2021	Perak	96	(0)
2022	Penang	12	(0)
2023	Harini	24	(0)
2024–2026	Kuala Lumpur City	7	(0)

International career^{‡}
2017–2018	Malaysia	9	(0)
Medal record
Men's football
Representing Malaysia
AFF Championship
Runner-up	2018
- * Club domestic league appearances and goals as of July 2026 ‡ National team caps and goals as of 16 October 2018

Muhammad Hafizul Hakim bin Khairul Nizam Jothy (born 30 March 1993) is a Malaysian professional footballer who plays as a goalkeeper.

== Early life ==
Hafizul was born on 30 March 1993 in Klinik Bhajan, Medan Gopeng, Ipoh, Perak. Hafizul is the first of 2 siblings. Hafizul got his early education in St. Michael's Institution in Ipoh, Perak. During his school days, he played as a midfielder but his interest started to be a goalkeeper during high school days. Back then, Hafizul never represented at any levels in football.

== Club career ==
=== Youth ===
Hafizul began his career in Perak's youth system, known as Perak FA President and Youth team during the 2010–2014 season. In 2013, he went to Harimau Muda B selection and was selected to represent the team in 2013 S.League. After one season with Harimau Muda B, Hafizul returned to Perak's youth system. Hafizul played in 2014 Sukma Games representing Perak. Their team won the gold medal after beating Johor 3–1 in the final at the Tuanku Syed Putra Stadium, Kangar, Perlis.

=== Melaka United ===
In 2015, Hafizul signed one-year deal with the third-tier team Melaka United in Malaysia FAM League and helped the team in their successful quest for promotion to 2016 Malaysia Premier League. Hafizul played in the last match of the season against Young Fighters on 24 August 2015.

=== Perak ===
In December 2015, Hafizul was announced to play for Perak in the 2016 season. Hafizul made his Super League debut on 14 February 2016, keeping a clean sheet in a 0–0 draw over Kelantan at the Perak Stadium. Due to the injury suffered by the regular custodian Zamir Selamat, Hafizul has been entrusted as the goalkeeper for 2016 season. His best performance winning plaudits from coaches and media and he was included in the FourFourTwo's Malaysia Super League 2016 Team of the month for February. Hafizul made 19 league appearances 7 clean sheets during his debut season.

Hafizul made his first appearance of the 2017 season as the first start in Perak's opening Super League match in a 1–1 draw against Pahang at home on 21 January 2017. Hafizul made all 22 league matches with 7 clean sheets.

In 2018 season, he was appointed as Perak co-vice captain together with Shahrul Saad.

=== Penang ===
On 17 December 2021, Hafizul completed his transfer to Penang for an undisclosed contract.

=== Harini FT ===
In 2023 he chose to sign for semi-pro club Harini FT competing in second tier Malaysia M3 League.

== International career ==
On 25 August 2016, Hafizul received his first call-up to the Malaysia national team for a friendly game with Indonesia on 6 September 2016 in Manahan Stadium, Solo. However he did not play in the game and was on the bench.

On 15 November 2016, Hafizul was selected in Malaysia's 23-man squad for the 2016 AFF Championship. As a third-choice goalkeeper behind Khairul Fahmi and Khairul Azhan, Hafizul was not to feature at that AFF Championship, in which Malaysia was eliminated in the group stage.

On 22 March 2017, Hafizul made his debut for Malaysia coming off the bench against Philippines in a 0–0 draw on the friendly game.

His international first start came in a 1–0 defeat to Myanmar on 29 August 2017 on the friendly game.

On 5 September 2017, Hafizul produced a last minute penalty save against Hong Kong to help the team to gain their first point in the 2019 Asian Cup qualification round with the score ended 1–1 draw.

== Sponsorship ==
Hafizul received a personal sponsorship to wear Uhlsport goalkeeping gloves.

== Career statistics ==
=== Club ===
As of 1 July 2025

Appearances and goals by club, season and competition
Club	Season	League			Cup		League Cup		Continental		Total	
Club	Season	Division	Apps	Goals	Apps	Goals	Apps	Goals	Apps	Goals	Apps	Goals
Melaka United	2015	Malaysia FAM League	1	0	0	0	0	0	–		1	0
Melaka United	Total		1	0	0	0	0	0	–		1	0
Perak	2016	Malaysia Super League	17	0	6	0	6	0	–		29	0
Perak	2017	Malaysia Super League	22	0	1	0	8	0	–		31	0
Perak	2018	Malaysia Super League	20	0	4	0	10	0	–		34	0
Perak	2019	Malaysia Super League	18	0	7	0	1	0	2	0	28	0
Perak	2020	Malaysia Super League	5	0	–						5	0
Perak	2021	Malaysia Super League	14	0	–		2	0	–		16	0
Perak	Total		96	0	18	0	27	0	2	0	143	0
Penang	2022	Malaysia Super League	12	0	3	0	1	0	–		16	0
Penang	Total		12	0	3	0	1	0	–		16	0
Harini	2023	Malaysia M3 League	24	0	0	0	2	0	–		26	0
Harini	Total		24	0	0	0	2	0	–		26	0
Kuala Lumpur City	2024–25	Malaysia Super League	7	0	0	0	0	0	2	0	9	0
Kuala Lumpur City	2025–26	Malaysia Super League	0	0	0	0	0	0	0	0	0	0
Kuala Lumpur City	Total		7	0	0	0	0	0	2	0	9	0
Career total			140	0	21	0	30	0	4	0	195	0

=== International ===
As of 16 October 2018

Appearances and goals by national team and year
National team	Year	Apps	Goals
Malaysia	2017	6	0
Malaysia	2018	3	0
Total		9	0

== Honours ==
=== Club ===
Melaka United

- Malaysia FAM League: 2015

Perak

- Malaysia Super League: Runner-up 2018
- Malaysia Cup: 2018, Runner-up 2019

=== International ===
Malaysia

- AFF Championship: Runner-up 2018
