= 2023 Malaysia M3 League =

MBSB Bank Championship
- Season: 2023
- Champions: Immigration FC
- Relegated: Naga UKS
- Matches: 165
- Goals: 501 (3.04 per match)
- Top goalscorer: Azim Rahim (24 goals)
- Biggest home win: Harini 5–1 Naga UKS (27 May)
- Biggest away win: Naga UKS 1–10 Malaysia University (11 March)
- Highest scoring: 11 goals Naga UKS 1–10 Malaysia University (11 March)
- Longest winning run: 7 matches (KL Rovers)
- Longest unbeaten run: 17 matches (KL Rovers)
- Longest winless run: 19 matches (Naga UKS)
- Longest losing run: 19 matches (Naga UKS)
- All statistics correct as of 21 October 2023.

The 2023 Malaysia M3 League, known as the 2023 MBSB Bank Championship for sponsorship reasons, was the third season of the MBSB Bank Championship, the second tier football league in Malaysia, since its establishment in 2019. The season lasted from March to October.

== Establishment and format ==
This new season saw the format restructuring by the Amateur Football League (AFL). On 19 January 2020, the AFL has announced the format changes for the Malaysia M3 League and Malaysia M4 League in preparation for the transition of the amateur team to semi-professionals by 2021.

The league will kick-off with 14 teams into one single group of league. The top four teams will play in the play-offs to determine which teams will qualify for promotion to the Super League in the 2024 season. The bottom two teams will be relegated to the M4 League.

== Team changes ==
The following teams have changed division since the 2022 season.

=== To MBSB Bank Championship ===
Ejected from the Super League

- Sarawak United

New Team

- Melaka

=== From MBSB Bank Championship ===
Relegated to Al-Ikhsan Cup

- FC Langkawi
- Kijang Rangers
- Langkawi City
- Real Chukai
- Tok Janggut Warriors
- Tun Razak City

Teams withdrawn

- Kinabalu Jaguar
- Respect

=== Name changes ===
- Ultimate was renamed to Naga Ultimate Kuala Selangor FC (Naga UKS).

== Teams ==
As of 29 December 2022, 14 clubs confirmed their participation in the 2023 Malaysia M3 League.

- Armed Forces
- (Penang) Bukit Tambun
- (Perak) BRM
- (Selangor) Harini
- (Putrajaya) Immigration
- Kuala Lumpur Rovers
- (Malaysia) Malaysian University
- (Perak) Manjung City
- (Malacca) Melaka
- Naga Ultimate Kuala Selangor
- Perlis United
- (Selangor) PIB Shah Alam
- (Negeri Sembilan) SAINS
- Sarawak United

== Club locations ==
Locations of teams in the 2022 Malaysia M3 League

=== Venues ===
Team	Location	Stadium	Capacity
Armed Forces	Kampung Datuk Keramat	Mindef Stadium	5,000
BRM	Kuala Kangsar	Perak Stadium	42,500
Bukit Tambun	Bukit Tambun	Penang State Stadium	40,000
Harini	Kuala Selangor	UPM Stadium	3,000
Immigration	Putrajaya	UPM Stadium	3,000
Kuala Lumpur Rovers	Cheras, Kuala Lumpur	Kuala Lumpur Stadium	16,000
Malaysian University	Kuala Lumpur	UM Arena Stadium	1,000
Manjung City	Seri Manjung	Manjung Stadium	15,000
Melaka	Krubong	Hang Jebat Stadium	40,000
Naga Ultimate Kuala Selangor	Kuala Selangor	Kuala Selangor Stadium	1,000
Perlis United	Kangar	Tuanku Syed Putra Stadium	20,000
PIB Shah Alam	Shah Alam	USIM Stadium	1,000
SAINS	Seremban	Tuanku Abdul Rahman Stadium	45,000
Sarawak United	Kuching	Sarawak State Stadium	20,000

== Personnel, kits and sponsoring ==
Team	Head coach	Captain	Kit manufacturer	Sponsor
Armed Forces	(England) Kevin Lee Cooper	(Malaysia) Venice Elphi	AL Sports	MBSB Bank
BRM	(Malaysia) Mohd Ali Khan Abdullah	(Malaysia) Kamarul Effandi Abdul Rahim	AL Sports	Raudhah Islamic School; Jasmin7
Bukit Tambun	(Malaysia) Mahamud Harun	(Malaysia) Hafidz Romly	AL Sports	GIMmedia
Harini	(Malaysia) P. Maniam	(Malaysia) Norshahrul Idlan Talaha	Ma7ch	Harini; MBSB Bank
Immigration	(Malaysia) Mat Zan Mat Aris	(Malaysia) Mohd Nasriq Baharom	Let's Play Performance	redONE; MBSB Bank
Kuala Lumpur Rovers	(Malaysia) Wan Mustaffa Wan Ismail	(Malaysia) Firdaus Fauzi	Ma7ch	MBSB Bank
Malaysian University	(Malaysia) Ridzuan Abu Shah	(Malaysia) Amirul Fazly Zamri	Ma7ch	
Manjung City	(Malaysia) Rafae Isa	(Malaysia) Faizzzwan Dorahim	Cheetah	Majlis Perbandaran Manjung; ANE Group
Melaka	(Portugal) Pedro Hipólito	(Malaysia) Idris Ahmad	Puma	
Naga Ultimate Kuala Selangor	(Serbia) Dusan Momcilovic	(Malaysia) Mohamad Firdaus Yusof	AL Sports	
Perlis United	(Malaysia) Azhar Abdul Rahman	(Malaysia) Azizi Matt Rose	Ma7ch	SGT Power
PIB Shah Alam	(Malaysia) Yusrizal Yusoff	(Malaysia) Adam Syafiq Fuad	AL Sports	MBSB Bank
SAINS	(Malaysia) Hamizar Hamzah	(Malaysia) Alif Samsudin	Kaki Jersi	MBI Negeri Sembilan
Sarawak United	(Malaysia) S. Balachandran	(Malaysia) Nor Azizi Ramlee	AL Sports	Punggor Wibawa

== League table ==
Pos	Team	Pld	W	D	L	GF	GA	GD	Pts	Qualification or relegation
1	Immigration (C)	24	17	4	3	53	15	+38	55	
2	Kuala Lumpur Rovers	24	16	6	2	48	14	+34	54	Qualified to the 2023 Malaysia Cup
3	Harini	24	15	6	3	56	21	+35	51	Qualified to the 2023 Malaysia Cup
4	Bukit Tambun	24	14	3	7	36	27	+9	45	
5	SAINS	24	11	5	8	34	30	+4	38	Withdrew from A1 Semi-Pro League and dissolved (Note: SAINS, Perlis United & Sarawak United all withdrew from Liga M3 and folded before the start of the 2024 season.)
6	Malaysian University	24	11	3	10	43	28	+15	36	
7	Manjung City	24	9	7	8	35	31	+4	34	
8	Perlis United	24	9	5	10	35	31	+4	32	Withdrew from A1 Semi-Pro League and dissolved
9	PIB Shah Alam	24	9	4	11	32	31	+1	31	
10	Melaka	24	8	7	9	38	38	0	31	
11	Armed Forces	24	7	5	12	34	30	+4	26	
12	Sarawak United	24	1	1	22	18	80	−62	4	Withdrew from A1 Semi-Pro League and dissolved
13	Naga UKS (R)	24	1	0	23	14	100	−86	3	Relegated to the 2024 Al - Ikhsan Cup
14	BRM FC	0	0	0	0	0	0	0	0	Withdrew and folded, record expunged (Note: On 20 Jun 2023 AFL announced they accepted the withdrawal of BRM FC, who folded due to financial problems. BRM FC's record was expunged.)

Source: FAM-CMS
Rules for classification: 1) Points; 2) Goal difference; 3) Number of goals scored.
(C) League Champion; (R) Relegated

=== Position by round ===
Team ╲ Round	1	2	3	4	5	6	7	8	9	10	11	12	13	14	15	16	17	18	19	20	21	22	23	24
Immigration	5	5	4	6	5	3	3	3	5	4	3	3	3	3	3	3	3	3	2	2	2	1	2	1
Kuala Lumpur Rovers	2	1	1	2	1	1	1	1	1	2	1	1	1	1	1	1	1	1	1	1	1	2	1	2
Harini	1	4	3	3	4	2	2	2	2	1	2	2	2	2	2	2	2	2	3	3	3	3	3	3
Bukit Tambun	4	3	6	5	2	4	5	4	3	5	4	4	4	4	4	4	4	4	4	4	4	4	4	4
SAINS	3	2	2	1	3	5	4	5	4	3	5	5	5	5	5	5	5	5	6	5	5	5	5	5
Malaysian University	10	11	5	4	6	7	7	6	9	11	11	10	11	9	10	10	6	6	6	6	7	6	6	6
Manjung City	8	9	9	11	10	10	10	10	8	6	7	8	9	10	6	6	8	9	9	7	6	6	9	7
Perlis United	7	10	10	8	8	6	6	7	6	7	6	6	6	6	8	9	7	7	7	8	8	8	7	8
PIB Shah Alam	9	11	11	12	12	11	11	11	10	8	9	7	7	7	9	8	10	10	10	11	11	11	10	9
Melaka	12	12	7	7	7	8	8	9	7	10	10	11	10	11	7	7	9	8	8	9	9	9	8	10
Armed Forces	6	8	8	9	11	9	9	8	11	9	8	9	8	8	11	11	11	11	11	10	10	10	11	11
Sarawak United	13	12	12	10	12	12	12	12	12	12	12	12	12	12	12	12	12	12	12	12	12	12	12	12
Naga Ultimate Kuala Selangor	11	13	13	13	13	13	13	13	13	13	13	13	13	13	13	13	13	13	13	13	13	13	13	13

League Leader
Qualified to 2023 Malaysia Cup
Qualified to 2023 Malaysia Cup
Relegation to Al-Ikhsan Cup

Source: MFL

== Results table ==
Home \ Away	ARM	BKT	BRM	HAR	IFC	KLR	MAU	MCT	MEL	NAG	PLU	PIB	KSR	SWU
Armed Forces		1–2	3–1	1–2	0–1	0–2	1–3	1–1	1–0	3–0	1–1	1–2	1–1	4–2
Bukit Tambun	2–1			1–1	1–1	0–1	1–0	3–1	0–1	1–0	2–1	1–2	3–1	2–0
BRM		0–4			0–1		3–0					0–5		
Harini Selangor	3–1	3–1	3–1		1–2	1–1	3–1	0–0	3–3	5–1	2–3	1–1	2–1	3–0
Immigration	1–1	1–1		1–0		1–1	3–0	2–1	1–2	3–1	3–2	3–0	3–0	5–0
Kuala Lumpur Rovers	0–0	1–2		1–1	1–0		1–0	3–0	3–1	4–1	2–0	2–1	0–0	6–1
Malaysian University	2–1	3–1		1–2	2–3	0–3		1–2	1–1	4–0	0–0	1–0	0–1	5–1
Manjung City	2–0	2–3	0–2	0–4	0–3	2–0	0–2		3–3	3–0	3–2	0–0	2–0	4–0
Melaka	0–2	1–0		1–3	0–1	0–2	1–1	1–1		1–0	1–2	1–2	1–3	2–0
Naga Ultimate Kuala Selangor	0–6	1–2		0–8	0–6	0–5	1–10	1–3	1–7		0–8	2–6	0–3	3–2
Perlis United	0–2	1–3	2–1	0–3	0–1	0–1	0–1	1–0	2–2	2–1		0–0	2–1	1–0
PIB Shah Alam	1–0	1–0		1–2	0–4	0–2	0–2	0–0	3–4	2–0	1–2		0–1	6–1
SAINS	2–1	1–2	1–0	0–1	1–0	2–2	2–1	1–1	2–3	2–0	1–1	1–0		3–2
Sarawak United	0–4	1–3		0–2	0–4	1–4	0–2	0–4	1–1	4–1	0–4	0–3	2–4	

Source: FAM
Legend: Blue = home team win; Yellow = draw; Red = away team win.
For upcoming matches, an "a" indicates there is an article about the rivalry between the two participants.

== Season statistics ==
=== Top scorers ===
As of matches played on 21 October 2023

Rank	Player	Club	Goals
1	(Malaysia) Azim Rahim	Immigration	24
2	(Malaysia) Afeeq Iqmal	Manjung City	13
2	(Malaysia) Zulkiffli Zakaria	Harini	13
4	(Malaysia) Amer Saidin	KL Rovers	12
5	(Malaysia) Khyril Muhymeen	Harini	11
6	(Malaysia) Firdaus Azizul	Sains	10
6	(Malaysia) Sadam Hashim	Perlis United	10
8	(Malaysia) Ikhmal Ibrahim	Perlis United	9
9	(Malaysia) Fakhrul Aiman Sidid	Melaka	8
9	(Malaysia) Rafie Mat Yaccob	KL Rovers	8

=== Hat-tricks ===
Player	For	Against	Result	Date
(Malaysia) Alief Najmi Radzi	Malaysian University	Naga UKS FC	1-10 (A)	11 March 2023
(Malaysia) Syukur Saidin	Bukit Tambum	BRM Kuala Kangsar	0-4 (A)	6 May 2023
(Malaysia) Ikhmal Ibrahim	Perlis United	Naga UKS	0-8 (A)	20 May 2023
(Malaysia) Sadam Hashim	Perlis United	Naga UKS	0-8 (A)	20 May 2023
(Malaysia) Afeeq Iqmal	Manjung City	Sarawak United	0-4 (A)	10 June 2023
(Malaysia) Azim Rahim^{4}	Immigration	Naga UKS	0-6 (A)	24 June 2023
(Malaysia) Fauzi Kadar	Bukit Tambun	Manjung City	2-3 (A)	8 July 2023
(Malaysia) Khyril Muhymeen	Harini	Armed Forces	3-1 (H)	15 August 2023
(Malaysia) Azim Rahim	Immigration	PIB Shah Alam	3-0 (H)	2 September 2023
(Malaysia) Zulkiffli Zakaria	Harini	Naga UKS	0-8 (A)	4 September 2023
(Malaysia) Amirul Nizam	PIB	Naga UKS	2-6 (A)	14 October 2023

Notes

^{4} Player scored 4 goals
^{5} Player scored 5 goals
(H) – Home team
(A) – Away team

=== Clean sheets ===
As of 21 October 2023

Rank	Player	Club	Clean sheets
1	(Malaysia) Ameerul Eqwan Fauzi	KL Rovers	14
2	(Malaysia) Firdaus Suhaimi	Manjung	8
3	(Malaysia) Hafizul Hakim	Harini	7
3	(Malaysia) Izarul Adli	Immigration	7
4	(Malaysia) Ashraf Fadhil	Malaysian University	6
4	(Malaysia) Kaharuddin Rahman	Sains	6
7	(Malaysia) Solehin Mamat	Immigration	5
7	(Malaysia) Shahrizan Shafiq	Armed Forces	5
9	(Malaysia) Hafidz Romly	Bukit Tambun	4
9	(Malaysia) Hafiz Abu Bakar	Perlis	4
9	(Malaysia) Izzat Abdul Rahim	PIB Shah Alam	4
9	(Malaysia) Wan Azraie	PIB Shah Alam	4
13	(Malaysia) Asri Muhamad	Perlis United	2
13	(Malaysia) Nasrullah Aziz	Melaka	2
15	(Malaysia) Amar Haziq	Malaysian University	1
15	(Malaysia) Asfa Abiddin	Bukit Tambun	1
15	(Malaysia) Hafizudin Azuhar	Armed Forces	1
15	(Malaysia) Daniel Wafiuddin	Melaka	1
15	(Malaysia) Izzat Hakimi	Sains	1

== See also ==
- 2023 Piala Sumbangsih
- 2023 Malaysia Super League
- 2023 Malaysia M4 League
- 2023 Malaysia M5 League
- 2023 Malaysia FA Cup
- 2023 Malaysia Cup
- 2023 MFL Challenge Cup
- 2023 MFL Cup
- 2023 Piala Presiden
