= Nana Poku =

Ghanaian professional football striker (born 1992)

Personal information
- Date of birth: 1 September 1992 (age 34)
- Place of birth: Ghana
- Height: 1.80 m (5 ft 11 in)
- Position: Striker

Team information
- Current team: TRAU
- Number: 30

Senior career*
Years	Team	Apps	(Gls)
2010–2012	Berekum Arsenal	38	(32)
2012–2014	Ashdod	14	(7)
2012	→ Hapoel Kfar Saba (loan)	9	(2)
2014–2015	Ittihad El Shorta	36	(11)
2015–2017	Misr Lel-Makkasa	50	(24)
2017	→ Al Shabab (loan)	8	(0)
2018	Zamalek	5	(1)
2018–2019	Al-Wakrah	12	(10)
2019–2021	Al-Markhiya	14	(5)
2021	UiTM	9	(2)
2021–2022	Perak	10	(5)
2022	Dewa United	0	(0)
2022–	TRAU	8	(2)
- * Club domestic league appearances and goals as of 20:40, 7 February 2023 (UTC)

Nana Poku (born 1 September 1992) is a Ghanaian professional footballer who plays as a forward for TRAU in the I-League.

== Career ==
In the 2010–11 season, Nana Poku won the "Goal King" award in the Ghana Premier League with 16 goals for Berekum Arsenal. In 2014, he signed a three-year contract with Egyptian club Ittihad El Shorta, which followed spells with Ashdod and Hapoel Kfar Saba (loan) in Israel. In 2015, Poku joined fellow Egyptian team Misr Lel-Makkasa before subsequently joining UAE Arabian Gulf League side Al Shabab at the end of 2016.

Poku's contract at Zamalek was terminated on 29 June 2018 after reaching a mutual agreement.

In 2022, Poku moved to India and signed with I-League club TRAU. He made his league debut on 15 November in their 1–1 draw against Aizawl.

== Career statistics ==
=== Club ===
As of 7 February 2023

Club	Season	League			Cup		Continental		Total	
Club	Season	Division	Apps	Goals	Apps	Goals	Apps	Goals	Apps	Goals
Amidaus Professionals	2013–14	Ghana Premier League	1	0	0	0	—		1	0
El Shorta	2014–15	Egyptian Premier League	36	11	2 (Note: Appearance(s) in Egypt Cup)	1	—		38	12
Misr Lel-Makkasa	2015–16	Egyptian Premier League	31	14	1	0	—		32	14
Misr Lel-Makkasa	2016–17	Egyptian Premier League	14	9	0	0	—		14	9
Misr Lel-Makkasa	2017–18	Egyptian Premier League	5	1	1	0	—		6	1
Misr Lel-Makkasa	Misr Lel-Makkasa total		50	24	2	0	0	0	52	24
Al Shabab (loan)	2016–17	UAE Pro League	8	0	2 (Note: Appearance(s) in UAE League Cup)	0	—		10	0
Zamalek	2017–18	Egyptian Premier League	5	1	0	0	2 (Note: Appearance(s) in CAF Confederation Cup)	0	7	1
UiTM	2021	Malaysia Super League	9	2	0	0	—		9	2
Perak	2021	Malaysia Super League	10	5	0	0	—		10	5
TRAU	2022–23	I-League	8	2	0	0	—		8	2
Career total			127	45	6	1	2	0	135	46

== Honours ==
Zamalek

- Egypt Cup: 2017–18

Individual

- "Goal King" Award – Ghana Premier League: 2010–11
