= Careca (footballer, born 1995) =

Brazilian footballer

Personal information
- Full name: Raianderson da Costa Morais
- Date of birth: 26 August 1995 (age 31)
- Place of birth: Rio Branco, Brazil
- Height: 1.85 m (6 ft 1 in)
- Position: Attacking midfielder

Team information
- Current team: Arema
- Number: 95

Senior career*
| Years | Team | Apps | (Gls) |
| 2014–2015 | Rio Branco | 1 | (1) |
| 2016 | Galvez | 0 | (0) |
| 2016–2019 | Atlético Acreano | 22 | (12) |
| 2017 | → Cruzeiro U20 (loan) | 0 | (0) |
| 2019–2021 | Perak | 28 | (11) |
| 2023 | Brasília | 8 | (2) |
| 2023–2025 | FC Gangneung | 50 | (10) |
| 2025–2026 | Terengganu | 22 | (8) |
| 2026– | Arema | 10 | (6) |
- * Club domestic league appearances and goals as of 20 November 2026

Raianderson da Costa Morais (born 26 August 1995), commonly known as Careca (Portuguese pronunciation: [kaˈɾɛkɐ]), is a Brazilian professional footballer who plays as an attacking midfielder for Super League club Arema.

== Club career ==
=== Perak ===
On 10 May 2019, Careca signed a contract with Malaysian club Perak.

=== Terengganu ===
On 9 July 2025, Careca signed a one-year contract with Malaysia Super League club Terengganu.

== Career statistics ==
=== Club ===
As of match played 12 September 2024

Appearances and goals by club, season and competition
| Club | Season | League | | | Cup (Note: Malaysia FA Cup) | | League Cup (Note: Malaysia Cup) | | Continental | | Total | |
| Club | Season | Division | Apps | Goals | Apps | Goals | Apps | Goals | Apps | Goals | Apps | Goals |
|---|---|---|---|---|---|---|---|---|---|---|---|---|
| Perak | 2019 | Malaysia Super League | 10 | 7 | 4 | 0 | 1 | 1 | 0 | 0 | 15 | 8 |
| Perak | 2020 | Malaysia Super League | 6 | 0 | 0 | 0 | 0 | 0 | – | | 6 | 0 |
| Perak | 2021 | Malaysia Super League | 12 | 4 | 0 | 0 | 0 | 0 | – | | 12 | 4 |
| Perak | Total | | 28 | 11 | 4 | 0 | 1 | 1 | 0 | 0 | 33 | 12 |
| Terengganu | 2025–26 | Malaysia Super League | 0 | 0 | 0 | 0 | 0 | 0 | 0 | 0 | 0 | 0 |
| Terengganu | Total | | 0 | 0 | 0 | 0 | 0 | 0 | 0 | 0 | 0 | 0 |
