= Adib Ra'op =

Malaysian footballer

Personal information
- Full name: Muhammad Adib bin Abdul Ra'op
- Date of birth: 25 October 1999 (age 27)
- Place of birth: Bagan Datuk, Perak, Malaysia
- Height: 1.75 m (5 ft 9 in)
- Position: Left-back

Team information
- Current team: Selangor
- Number: 46

Youth career
- 2017–2020: Perak

Senior career*
Years	Team	Apps	(Gls)
2020–2021	Perak	23	(0)
2020–2021	Perak II	10	(5)
2022–2026	Penang	78	(2)
2026–	Selangor	2	(0)

International career^{‡}
2024–	Malaysia	5	(1)
- * Club domestic league appearances and goals as of 30 June 2026 ‡ National team caps and goals as of 21 December 2024

Muhammad Adib bin Abdul Ra'op (born 25 October 1999) is a Malaysian professional footballer who plays as a left-back for Malaysia Super League club Selangor and the Malaysia national team.

== Early life ==
Born and raised in Bagan Datuk, Perak, Adib received his primary education at Sekolah Kebangsaan Bagan Pasir before attending SMK Tun Abdul Razak from 2012 to 2013. He continued his studies at SMK Seri Perkasa in 2014 before returning to SMK Tun Abdul Razak in 2015. In 2016, he enrolled at SMK Raja Muda Musa, where his footballing abilities were further developed under the guidance of the school's coaches and teachers.

== Club career ==
=== Perak ===
Adib made his debut with Perak II in the 2020 Malaysia Premier League against Kelantan United on 1 March 2020. He played 76 minutes in that match. He scored his first goal in a 2–1 defeat against Selangor II on 14 March 2020. Adib received his first player of the match award in a 2–2 draw against Sarawak United on 29 August 2020. He received his second player of the match award in a 5–1 win against Kuching City where he contributed 2 goals.

In September 2020, Adib was promoted to the senior team of Perak. He made his debut in a 1–0 win against UiTM coming in as substitutes in the 73rd minutes. Overall he made 5 appearances as substitutes in his debut season with the first team. The following season, Adib made a total of 18 league appearances and 6 Malaysia Cup appearances where he scored 1 goal in a 2–2 draw against Kuching City.

=== Penang ===
Adib left at the end of the season due to internal problems that occur in Perak. Penang announced him as their new player on 17 December 2021.

=== Selangor FC ===
On 1 July 2026, Adib joined Selangor, becoming the third signing for the club after Azam Azih and Selvan Anbualagan.

== International career ==
On 23 May 2024, Adib received his first national call up for 2026 FIFA World Cup qualification and 2027 AFC Asian Cup qualification. He made his debut on 6 June 2024 in the 2026 FIFA World Cup qualifier against Kyrgyzstan at the Dolen Omurzakov Stadium. He substituted Stuart Wilkin in the 83rd minute as the game ended in a 1–1 draw.

On 11 June 2024 in the match against Chinese Taipei at the Bukit Jalil National Stadium, he came on as a substitute for Akhyar Rashid in the 74th minute and scored his first international goal in stoppage time which gave Malaysia a 3–1 victory.

== Career statistics ==
=== Club ===
As of match played 15 May 2026

Appearances and goals by club, season and competition
Club	Season	League			Cup		League cup		Others^{1}		Total	
Club	Season	Division	Apps	Goals	Apps	Goals	Apps	Goals	Apps	Goals	Apps	Goals
Perak II	2020	Malaysia Premier League	6	3	–		–		–		6	3
Perak II	2021	Malaysia Premier League	4	2	–		–		–		4	2
Perak II	Total		10	5	–		–		–		10	5
Perak	2020	Malaysia Super League	5	0	0	0	1	0	–		6	0
Perak	2021	Malaysia Super League	18	0	–		6	1	–		24	1
Perak	Total		23	0	0	0	7	1	–		30	1
Penang	2022	Malaysia Super League	17	1	4	1	2	0	–		23	2
Penang	2023	Malaysia Super League	21	0	2	0	2	0	4	0	29	0
Penang	2024–25	Malaysia Super League	22	1	3	0	2	0	4	0	31	1
Penang	2025–26	Malaysia Super League	20	0	4	1	2	0	5	0	31	1
Penang	Total		80	2	13	2	8	0	13	0	114	4
Selangor	2026–27	Malaysia Super League	0	0	0	0	0	0	0	0	0	0
Career total			113	7	13	2	15	1	13	0	134	10

^{1} Includes MFL Challenge Cup

=== International ===
As of 14 December 2024

Appearances and goals by national team and year
National team	Year	Apps	Goals
Malaysia	2024	5	1
Total		5	1

=== International goals ===
No.	Date	Venue	Opponent	Score	Result	Competition
1.	11 June 2024	Bukit Jalil National Stadium, Kuala Lumpur, Malaysia	Chinese Taipei	3–1	3–1	2026 FIFA World Cup qualification

== Honours ==
Penang

- MFL Challenge Cup runner-up: 2026

ASEAN All-Stars

- Maybank Challenge Cup: 2025
