= Leandro dos Santos =

Brazilian footballer (born 1986)

Personal information
- Full name: Leandro dos Santos Oliveira
- Date of birth: 29 October 1986 (age 40)
- Place of birth: Niterói, Brazil
- Height: 1.78 m (5 ft 10 in)
- Positions: Center midfielder; defensive midfielder

Youth career
- 2005: Botafogo

Senior career*
Years	Team	Apps	(Gls)
2007–2008	Cacerense	53	(18)
2008–2010	Luverdense	86	(31)
2010	Vila Aurora	9	(1)
2010–2012	Army United	28	(18)
2012–2013	Police United	25	(9)
2013–2014	Bangkok Glass	28	(0)
2014	T-Team	9	(1)
2015	Selangor FC	17	(1)
2016	Luverdense	4	(0)
2017–2021	Perak FC	64	(9)
- * Club domestic league appearances and goals as of 11 May 2021

Leandro dos Santos Oliveira (born 29 October 1986), or simply Leandro, is a Brazilian professional footballer who plays mainly as a midfielder but can also play as a defensive midfielder.

== Club career ==
=== Army United ===
Leandro dos Santos joined Thai club Army United in 2011. He made an impressive start to his Army United career by scoring 4 goals in his first 4 appearances.

=== Perak ===
On 9 June 2017, Leandro dos Santos signed with Malaysian side Perak.

== Career statistics ==
=== Club ===
As of 7 November 2020

Appearances and goals by club, season and competition
Club	Season	League			Cup		League Cup		Continental		Total	
Club	Season	Division	Apps	Goals	Apps	Goals	Apps	Goals	Apps	Goals	Apps	Goals
Selangor	2015	Malaysia Super League	17	1	2	0	11	0	–		30	1
Selangor	Total		17	1	2	0	11	0	0	0	30	1
Perak	2017	Malaysia Super League	7	0	0	0	7	1	–		14	1
Perak	2018	Malaysia Super League	20	3	3	0	10	2	–		33	5
Perak	2019	Malaysia Super League	17	2	7	0	7	2	2	0	33	4
Perak	2020	Malaysia Super League	8	3	0	0	1	3	–		9	6
Perak	2021	Malaysia Super League	0	0	0	0	0	0	–		0	0
Perak	Total		52	8	10	0	25	8	2	0	89	16
Career Total			0	0	0	0	0	0	0	0	0	0

== Honours ==
=== Club ===
Bangkok Glass

- Thai FA Cup runner-up: 2013

Selangor

- Malaysia Cup winner: 2015

Perak TBG F.C.

- Malaysia Cup winner: 2018
- Malaysia Super League runner up: 2018
