= Zoubairou Garba =

Cameroonian footballer

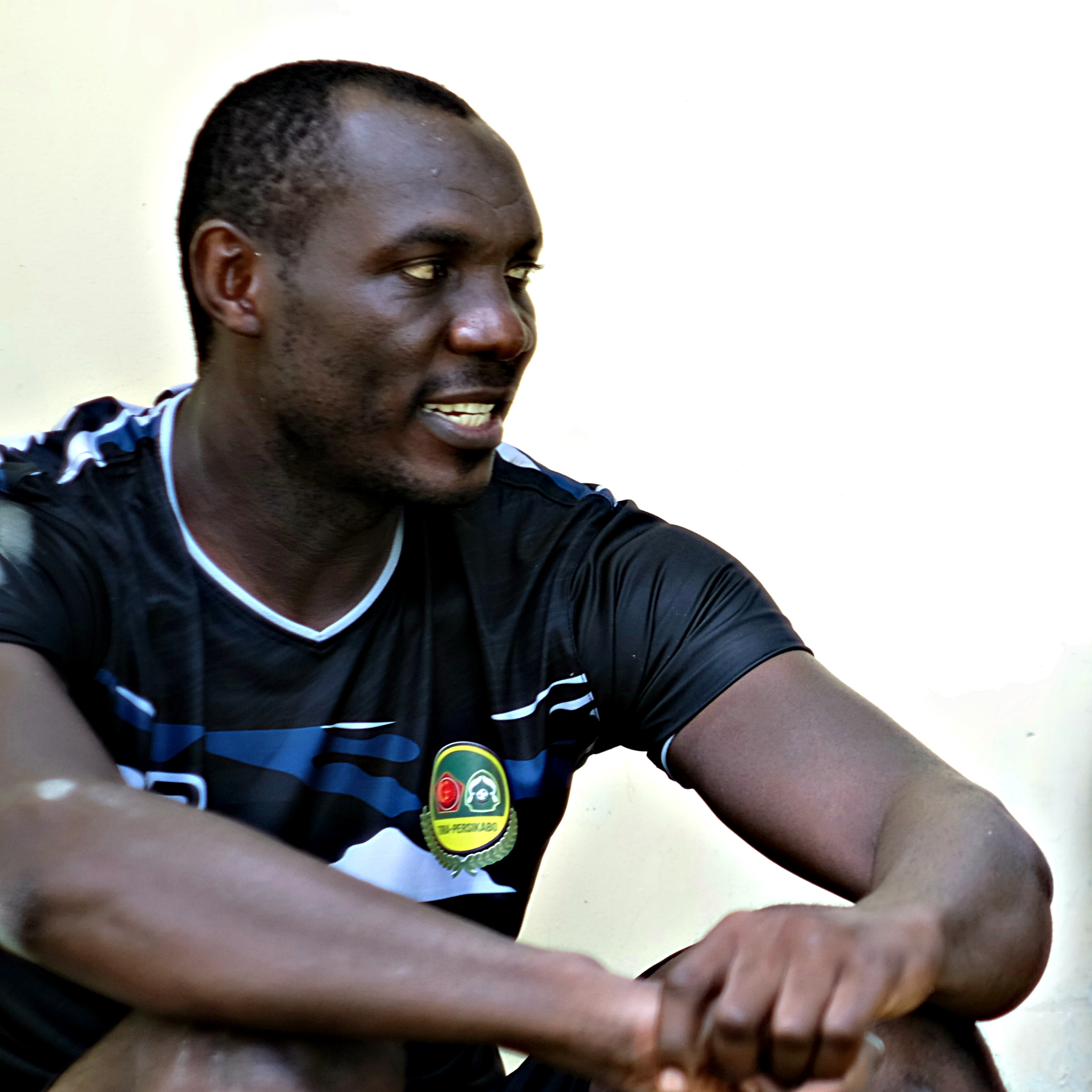
- Zoubairou with TIRA-Persikabo in 2019

Personal information
- Full name: Mountala Zoubairou Garba Daniel
- Date of birth: 20 October 1985 (age 41)
- Place of birth: Bertoua, Cameroon
- Height: 1.87 m (6 ft 2 in)
- Position: Centre-back

Senior career*
Years	Team	Apps	(Gls)
2006–2008	PSIS Semarang	55	(0)
2008–2009	Sriwijaya	4	(0)
2010–2011	PSIS Semarang	0	(0)
2011–2012	Persih Tembilahan	9	(0)
2019	TIRA-Persikabo	14	(0)
2020	Persebaya Surabaya	0	(0)
2021	Perak	1	(0)
Total		83	(0)
- * Club domestic league appearances and goals as of 24 July 2021

Mountala Zoubairou Garba Daniel (born 20 October 1986) is a Cameroonian former footballer who plays as a centre-back.

== Club career ==
Zoubairou was born in Cameroon.

=== PSIS Semarang ===
In 2006, Zoubairou joined PSIS Semarang, when he joined PSIS Semarang in the 2006 season. At that time, PSIS Semarang was brought to the Final before finally losing 1–0 by Persik Kediri at Manahan Stadium through Cristian Gonzáles's goal in 107 minutes of extra time. His duet with Maman Abdurrahman and Fofee Kamara at that time made the PSIS Semarang defense impenetrable. He is also familiar with supporters of PSIS Semarang, they call he with the nickname "Lek Slamet". In the 2007 season, he recorded 32 caps and received three yellow cards for PSIS Semarang in the 2007–08 season. But in the 2010–11 season, he canceled the PSIS Semarang because of administrative reasons, so the Semarang PSIS terminated his contract.

=== TIRA-Persikabo ===
In 2019, Zoubairou signed with TIRA-Persikabo for the 2019 Liga 1. He made his league debut in a 1–1 draw against Persib Bandung on 18 June 2019 as a substitute for Khurshed Beknazarov in the 71st minute at the Si Jalak Harupat Stadium, Soreang. Zoubairou made 14 league appearances and without scoring a goal for TIRA-Persikabo.

=== Persebaya Surabaya ===
He was signed for Persebaya Surabaya to play in Liga 1 in the 2020 season. This season was suspended on 27 March 2020 due to the COVID-19 pandemic. The season was abandoned and was declared void on 20 January 2021.

=== Perak FC ===
In 2021, Zoubairou signed a contract with Malaysia Super League club Perak. He made his league debut on 24 July 2021, in a 5–0 away loss against Terengganu as substitute. Zoubairou made 1 league appearance and without scoring a goal for Perak.

== Personal life ==
Born and raised in Cameroon, he acquired Indonesian citizenship in 2019.

== Career statistics ==
=== Club ===
As of 24 July 2021

Appearances and goals by club, season and competition
Club	Season	League			Cup		Continental		Other		Total	
Club	Season	Division	Apps	Goals	Apps	Goals	Apps	Goals	Apps	Goals	Apps	Goals
TIRA-Persikabo	2019	Liga 1	14	0	0	0	–		0	0	14	0
Persebaya Surabaya	2020	Liga 1	0	0	0	0	–		3 (Note: Appearances in East Java Governor Cup)	0	3	0
Perak	2021	Malaysia Super League	1	0	0	0	–		0	0	1	0
Career total			15	0	0	0	0	0	3	0	18	0

== Honours ==
PSIS Semarang

- Liga Indonesia Premier Division runner up: 2006

Persebaya Surabaya

- East Java Governor Cup: 2020
