= Kenny Pallraj =

Malaysian footballer

Personal information
- Full name: Kenny Pallraj a/l Davaragi
- Date of birth: 21 April 1993 (age 33)
- Place of birth: Ipoh, Malaysia
- Height: 1.83 m (6 ft 0 in)
- Position: Defensive midfielder

Team information
- Current team: Kuala Lumpur City
- Number: 21

Youth career
- 2012–2014: Perak U-21
- 2015: Harimau Muda

Senior career*
| Years | Team | Apps | (Gls) |
| 2015 | Harimau Muda | 21 | (0) |
| 2016–2021 | Perak | 76 | (3) |
| 2021– | Kuala Lumpur City | 35 | (0) |

International career^{‡}
| 2018– | Malaysia | 7 | (0) |
Medal record
Representing Malaysia
Men's Football
AFF Championship
| Runner-up | 2018 |
- * Club domestic league appearances and goals as of 12 September 2022 ‡ National team caps and goals as of 29 June 2020

Kenny Pallraj a/l Davaragi (born 21 April 1993) is a Malaysian professional footballer who plays as a defensive midfielder for Malaysia Super League club Kuala Lumpur City.

== Club career ==
=== Perak ===
Kenny began his football career playing for Perak youth team before he signed with Harimau Muda in 2015 and featured in Singaporean S.League. Kenny returned to Perak for 2016 Malaysia Super League season.

== International career ==
On 5 July 2018, Kenny made his debut for Malaysia national team in a friendly match against Fiji.

== Career statistics ==
=== Club ===
As of match played 12 September 2022

Appearances and goals by club, season and competition
| Club | Season | League | | | Cup | | League Cup | | Continental | | Total | |
| Club | Season | Division | Apps | Goals | Apps | Goals | Apps | Goals | Apps | Goals | Apps | Goals |
|---|---|---|---|---|---|---|---|---|---|---|---|---|
| Harimau Muda B | 2015 | S.League | 21 | 0 | 0 | 0 | 0 | 0 | – | | 21 | 0 |
| Harimau Muda B | Total | | 21 | 0 | 0 | 0 | 0 | 0 | 0 | 0 | 21 | 0 |
| Perak | 2016 | Malaysia Super League | 16 | 2 | 1 | 0 | ? | ? | – | | 17 | 2 |
| Perak | 2017 | Malaysia Super League | 11 | 0 | 0 | 0 | 8 | 1 | – | | 19 | 1 |
| Perak | 2018 | Malaysia Super League | 15 | 1 | 3 | 0 | 7 | 0 | – | | 25 | 1 |
| Perak | 2019 | Malaysia Super League | 13 | 0 | 3 | 0 | 1 | 0 | 2 | 0 | 19 | 0 |
| Perak | 2020 | Malaysia Super League | 10 | 0 | 0 | 0 | 0 | 0 | – | | 10 | 0 |
| Perak | 2021 | Malaysia Super League | 11 | 0 | 0 | 0 | 0 | 0 | – | | 11 | 0 |
| Perak | Total | | 76 | 3 | 7 | 0 | 16 | 1 | 2 | 0 | 101 | 4 |
| Kuala Lumpur City | 2021 | Malaysia Super League | 7 | 0 | – | | 11 | 0 | – | | 18 | 0 |
| Kuala Lumpur City | 2022 | Malaysia Super League | 12 | 0 | 1 | 0 | 3 | 0 | 6 | 0 | 22 | 0 |
| Kuala Lumpur City | Total | | 19 | 0 | 1 | 0 | 14 | 0 | 6 | 0 | 40 | 0 |
| Career Total | | | 0 | 0 | 0 | 0 | 0 | 0 | 0 | 0 | 0 | 0 |

=== International ===
As of match played 11 June 2019

Appearances and goals by national team and year
| National team | Year | Apps | Goals |
|---|---|---|---|
| Malaysia | 2018 | 5 | 0 |
| Malaysia | 2019 | 2 | 0 |
| Total | | 7 | 0 |

== Honours ==
Kuala Lumpur City

- Malaysia Cup: 2021
- AFC Cup runner-up: 2022
- Malaysia FA Cup runner-up: 2023

Perak

- Malaysia Super League runner-up: 2018
- Malaysia Cup: 2018
- Malaysia FA Cup runner-up: 2019

Malaysia

- AFF Championship runner-up: 2018
