= Nazirul Naim =

Malaysian former footballer (born 1993)

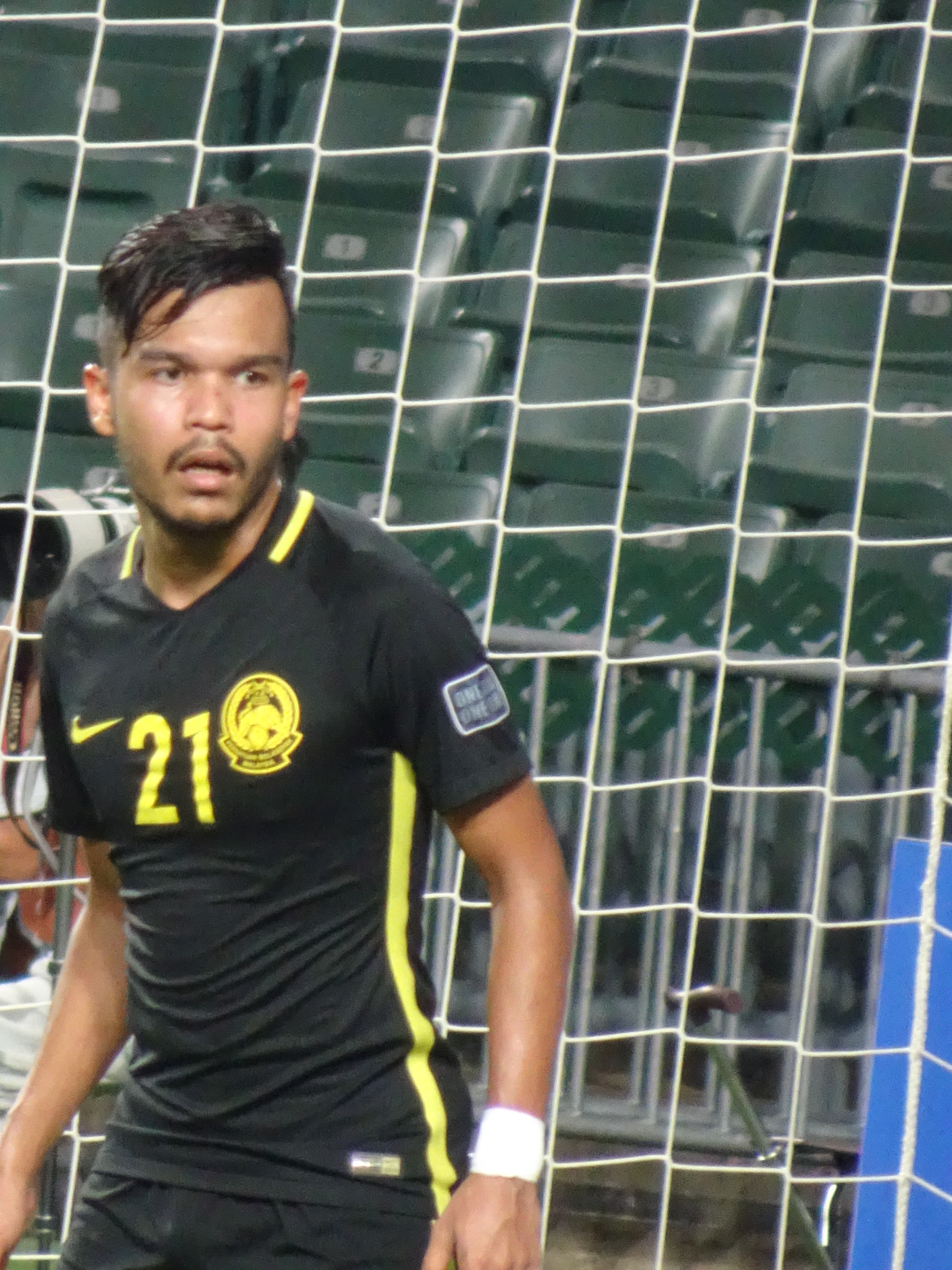
- Nazirul playing for Malaysia in 2017

Personal information
- Full name: Nazirul Naim bin Che Hashim
- Date of birth: 6 April 1993 (age 33)
- Place of birth: Kuala Kangsar, Perak, Malaysia
- Height: 1.66 m (5 ft 5 in)
- Position: Left-back

Youth career
- 2005–2007: Perak Youth
- 2007–2009: Bukit Jalil Sports School

Senior career*
Years	Team	Apps	(Gls)
2010–2011	Harimau Muda B	16	(0)
2011–2012	Harimau Muda A	31	(0)
2013	Ryūkyū	0	(0)
2014–2015	Harimau Muda A	35	(2)
2016–2021	Perak	91	(4)
2021–2022	Sabah	21	(0)
2023	Kuala Lumpur City	0	(0)

International career^{‡}
2007–2010	Malaysia U17	11	(0)
2011–2015	Malaysia U23	6	(1)
2015	Malaysia XI	1	(0)
2015–2023	Malaysia	21	(0)
Medal record
Men's football
Representing Malaysia
AFF Championship
Runner-up	2018
- * Club domestic league appearances and goals ‡ National team caps and goals as of 11 December 2019

Nazirul Naim bin Che Hashim (born 6 April 1993) is a Malaysian former professional footballer who played as a left-back.

Born in Kuala Kangsar, Nazirul has earned an early education at Clifford Secondary School, before moving to Bukit Jalil Sports School and beginning his football career there. Nazirul later progressed through the national youth set-up in Harimau Muda B and Harimau Muda A.

== Club career ==
=== Harimau Muda ===
Born and raised in Kampung Sayong Lembah, Kuala Kangsar, Nazirul was absorbed into the Harimau Muda B squad when he was 17 years old. They were competing in the Malaysia Premier League. Earlier he was part of the Bukit Jalil Sports School team who has won the President Cup in 2010.

The following year Nazirul started playing for Harimau Muda A. They were competing in the Malaysia Super League as he made 14 league appearances during his season debut. In 2012, the team joined Singaporean S.League. Nazirul made 17 appearances in the 2012 S.League season.

=== F.C. Ryūkyū ===
On 25 March 2013, Nazirul signed a one-year contract with Japan Football League club F.C. Ryūkyū after a 2-week trial. Nazirul's contract with the club was, however, terminated prematurely due to him being plagued by injuries, and without playing in any official matches, he returned to Harimau Muda A.

=== Perak ===
On 2 December 2015, Nazirul signed a contract with Malaysia Super League side Perak. On 13 February 2016, Nazirul started for Perak in a draw against Kelantan.

== International career ==
=== Youth ===
Nazirul has represented the Malaysia national team in many levels. At youth level, he was part of the Malaysia U-17 squad and Malaysia U-23 team.

=== Senior ===
Nazirul made his senior Malaysia national team debut coming on as a substitute for Zubir Azmi in a scoreless friendly against Bangladesh on 29 August 2015 at Shah Alam Stadium.

== Career statistics ==
=== Club ===
As of 5 September 2022

Appearances and goals by club, season and competition
Club	Season	League			Cup		League Cup		Continental		Total	
Club	Season	Division	Apps	Goals	Apps	Goals	Apps	Goals	Apps	Goals	Apps	Goals
Harimau Muda B	2010	Malaysia Premier League	?	?	?	?	–				?	?
Harimau Muda B	Total		?	?	?	?	–				?	?
Harimau Muda A	2011	Malaysia Super League	14	0	?	?	–				14	0
Harimau Muda A	2012	S.League	17	0	0	0	0	0	–		17	0
Harimau Muda A	Total		31	0	0	0	0	0	–	–	31	0
FC Ryukyu	2013	Japan Football League	0	0	0	0	0	0	–		0	0
FC Ryukyu	Total		0	0	0	0	0	0	–	–	0	0
Harimau Muda A	2014	NPL Queensland	10	0	0	0	0	0	–		10	0
Harimau Muda A	Total		10	0	0	0	0	0	–	–	10	0
Harimau Muda	2015	S.League	25	2	0	0	0	0	–		25	2
Harimau Muda	Total		25	2	0	0	0	0	–	–	25	2
Perak	2016	Malaysia Super League	15	1	3	0	?	?	–		18	1
Perak	2017	Malaysia Super League	20	0	1	0	9	0	–		30	0
Perak	2018	Malaysia Super League	21	1	4	0	10	0	–		35	1
Perak	2019	Malaysia Super League	20	1	5	1	1	0	1 (Note: Appearance in AFC Champions League play-off round)	1	27	3
Perak	2020	Malaysia Super League	5	0	–						5	0
Perak	2021	Malaysia Super League	10	1	–						10	1
Perak	Total		91	4	13	1	20	0	1	1	125	6
Sabah	2021	Malaysia Super League	6	0	–		6	0	–		12	0
Sabah	2022	Malaysia Super League	15	0	3	1	3	0	–		21	1
Sabah	Total		21	0	3	1	9	0	–		34	1
Kuala Lumpur City	2023	Malaysia Super League	0	0	0	0	0	0	–		0	0
Kuala Lumpur City	Total		0	0	0	0	0	0	0	0	0	0
Career Total			119	2	8	0	19	0	1	1	147	3

=== International ===
As of 11 December 2018

Appearances and goals by national team and year
National team	Year	Apps	Goals
Malaysia	2015	5	0
Malaysia	2016	4	0
Malaysia	2017	6	0
Malaysia	2018	5	0
Malaysia	2019	1	0
Total		21	0

== Personal life ==
Nazirul was married to a model Nor Wahila Ali Tarmizi since 2016.

== Honours ==
=== Club ===
Perak

- Malaysia FA Cup runner-up: 2019
- Malaysia Super League runner-up: 2018
- Malaysia Cup: 2018

=== International ===
Malaysia

- AFF Championship runner-up: 2018
