= Izaaq Izhan =

Malaysian footballer

Personal information
- Full name: Izaaq Izhan bin Yuswardi
- Date of birth: 23 January 1995 (age 31)
- Place of birth: Kuala Lumpur, Malaysia
- Position: Defender

Team information
- Current team: UM-Damansara United
- Number: 23

Senior career*
Years	Team	Apps	(Gls)
2019	PDRM		
2020	Negeri Sembilan	10	(1)
2021	Perak		
2021	→ Perak II (loan)	7	(0)
2022	UiTM	15	(0)
2023–2025	PDRM	21	(1)
2025–	UM-Damansara United		
- * Club domestic league appearances and goals

Izaaq Izhan bin Yuswardi (born 23 January 1995) is a Malaysian professional footballer who plays as a defender for UM-Damansara United.
