= Harini F.T. =

Malaysian football club

Harini
- Full name: Harini Football Team
- Nickname(s): The Eagles
- Founded: 2019; 6 years ago, as Batu Dua FC
- Ground: Kuala Selangor Stadium, Kuala Selangor
- Capacity: 10,000
- Owner: Harini Sdn Bhd
- Head coach: K. Ramachandran
- League: Malaysia A1 Semi-Pro League
- 2024–25: Malaysia A1 Semi-Pro League, 15th of 15 (relegated)
Home colours	Away colours

Harini Football Team, also known as Harini FT and Harini Selangor, is a Malaysian professional football club based in Jalan Klang Lama, Selangor. They last played in the second-tier Malaysia A1 Semi-Pro League.

== History ==
Batu Dua FC completed in the 2019 M3 League which later they got renamed as Harini Sdn Bhd company based in Kuala Selangor. The key factor of the branding was to strengthen the club's financial position which saved the Batu Dua FC, team which suffered financial difficulties in the last season. After being named as Harini FT, the team played the 2020 Malaysia M3 League season, while Harini FC II joined the FAS Premier League.

Harini FT also participated in the 2020 Malaysia FA Cup for the first time.

=== Crest ===
2019 crest

2020-2022 crest

== Season by season record ==
Season	Division	Position	Malaysia Cup	Malaysian FA Cup	MFL Challenge Cup	Regional	Top scorer (all competitions)
2019	Liga M3	10th	DNQ	Second round	–	–	(Malaysia) Fakhrurazi Musa (8)
2020^{1}	Liga M3	Season abandoned	DNQ	Preliminary round	–	–	
2021	Liga M3	Not held due to the COVID-19 pandemic					
2022	Liga M3	1st Group B	DNQ	First round	–	–	(Malaysia) Ramanshah Marajeh (8)
2023	Liga M3	3rd	Round of 16	DNQ	Quarter-final	–	(Malaysia) Zulkiffli Zakaria (13)
2024–25	Liga A1	15th (relegated)	DNQ	DNQ	DNQ	–	(Malaysia) G. Thipen Raj (7)

Notes:'

^1 2020 Season cancelled due to the COVID-19 pandemic, no promotion or league title was awarded.

Winners	Runners-up	Third place	Promoted	Relegated

== Players (2024) ==
Note: Flags indicate national team as defined under FIFA eligibility rules; some limited exceptions apply. Players may hold more than one non-FIFA nationality.

No.	Pos.	Nation	Player
1	GK	(Malaysia) MAS	Asheer Shafiq Abdul Karim
2	DF	(Ghana) GHA	Joseph Akegie Sogbe
3	DF	(Malaysia) MAS	Muhammad Iqmal Harun
4	DF	(Malaysia) MAS	Mohamad Azeddy Misra
5	DF	(Malaysia) MAS	R. Thinusean Pillai
6	FW	(Malaysia) MAS	G. Thipen Raj
7	MF	(Malaysia) MAS	Ahmad Solihin Abdul Rahman
10	MF	(Malaysia) MAS	Nur Areff Kamaruddin
11	MF	(Malaysia) MAS	Mohammad Ridzuan Razali
12	FW	(Malaysia) MAS	N. Thanabalan
13	MF	(Malaysia) MAS	Praviin
15	DF	(Malaysia) MAS	R. Gopinath

No.	Pos.	Nation	Player
16	MF	(Malaysia) MAS	Afiq Haikal Shamsul Bahrin
17	MF	(Malaysia) MAS	Nurhakimin Ghazali
18	MF	(Malaysia) MAS	Rafiq Shah Zaim
19	DF	(Malaysia) MAS	K. Thevendran
22	MF	(Malaysia) MAS	Alif Naufal Abdah
23	MF	(Malaysia) MAS	Salamon Raj (Captain)
26	GK	(Malaysia) MAS	Mohamad Firdaus Yusof
27	FW	(Malaysia) MAS	S. Chanturu
30	DF	(Malaysia) MAS	Farid Azmi
33	GK	(Malaysia) MAS	Budriz Ramlan
45	MF	(Malaysia) MAS	Amierul Ismail
55	MF	(Malaysia) MAS	Aizzat Hakimi Zaini

== Club personnel (2024) ==
- Team manager: (Malaysia) A. Thivagaran
- Head coach: (Malaysia) K. Ramachandran
- Assistant coach: (Malaysia) P. Somasundram
- Goalkeeping coach: (Malaysia) Lam Che Khan
- Physio: (Malaysia) Mohammad Fikri Enidzullah

== Kit manufacturers and shirt sponsors ==
Season	Manufacturer	Sponsor
2019	PUC Sport	Habiel Project, Yakult
2019	Kaki Jersi	Arca Konsep Sdn. Bhd.
2020–2022	Harini	
2023	AL Sports	Harini, MBSB Bank
2024–2025	Line 7	Harini, MBSB Bank

== Honours ==
=== League ===
- South Selangor League

(gold) Winners (1): 2018

- KL City League

(gold) Winners (1): 2019

- Selangor Champions League

(gold) Winners (1): 2019

- Division3/M3 League/A1 League

(bronze) Third place (1): 2023

=== Cup ===
- eMFL Malaysia Cup

(gold) Winners (1): 2023
