= Firdaus Saiyadi =

Malaysian association football player

Personal information
- Full name: Muhammad Firdaus bin Saiyadi
- Date of birth: 22 October 1996 (age 30)
- Place of birth: Perak, Malaysia
- Height: 1.72 m (5 ft 8 in)
- Positions: Attacking midfielder; winger

Team information
- Current team: Penang
- Number: 14

Youth career
- –2014: Newcastle Jets
- –2016: Perak

Senior career*
Years	Team	Apps	(Gls)
2016–2025	Perak	98	(5)
2023	→ Kuala Lumpur City (loan)	3	(0)
2025–	Penang	17	(1)

International career^{‡}
2019	Malaysia	0	(0)
- * Club domestic league appearances and goals as of 17 August 2026 ‡ National team caps and goals as of 1 February 2023

Muhammad Firdaus bin Saiyadi (born 22 October 1996) is a Malaysian footballer who plays as a winger for Malaysia Super League club Penang.

== Club career ==
=== Perak ===
Firdaus made his senior debut after being promoted from the youth team in 2016. He has made 10 appearances in Malaysia Super League during his senior debut with Perak FC.

In 2014, while playing for the youth team, he was sent to Australia to train with Newcastle Jets for 9 days.

=== Kuala Lumpur City (Loan) ===
On 12 January 2023, Firdaus joined Malaysia Super League club Kuala Lumpur City on a 6 months loans before returning to Perak FC on 25 July 2023.

=== Penang ===
On 9 June 2025, Firdaus signed for Malaysia Super League club Penang on free transfer as Penang looking to build up their teams.

== Career statistics ==
=== Club ===
As of match played 12 September 2024

Appearances and goals by club, season and competition
Club	Season	League			Cup (Note: Malaysia FA Cup)		League Cup (Note: Malaysia Cup)		Continental		Total	
Club	Season	Division	Apps	Goals	Apps	Goals	Apps	Goals	Apps	Goals	Apps	Goals
Perak	2016	Malaysia Super League	10	1	–		–		–		10	1
Perak	2017	Malaysia Super League	0	0	0	0	0	0	–		0	0
Perak	2018	Malaysia Super League	0	0	0	0	8	2	–		8	2
Perak	2019	Malaysia Super League	20	0	6	0	1	0	2	0	29	0
Perak	2020	Malaysia Super League	10	0	–						10	0
Perak	2021	Malaysia Super League	15	0	–		4	0	–		19	0
Perak	2022	Malaysia Premier League	15	1	2	0	–		–		17	1
Perak	2023	Malaysia Super League	6	0	0	0	4	0	–		10	0
Perak	2024–25	Malaysia Super League	22	3	1	0	4	1	–		27	4
Perak	Total		98	5	9	0	21	3	2	0	130	7
Kuala Lumpur City (loan)	2023	Malaysia Super League	3	0	2	0	0	0	–		5	0
Kuala Lumpur City (loan)	Total		3	0	2	0	0	0	0	0	5	0
Penang	2025–26	Malaysia Super League	7	1	0	0	3	0	–		10	1
Penang	Total		7	1	0	0	3	0	0	0	10	1
Career total			108	6	11	0	24	3	2	0	145	8

== Honours ==
Perak

- Malaysia Cup: 2018
- Malaysia Super League runner-up: 2018
- Malaysia FA Cup runner-up: 2019

Kuala Lumpur City

- Malaysia FA Cup runner-up: 2023

Penang

- MFL Challenge Cup runner-up: 2026
