= Shahrul Saad =

Malaysian footballer

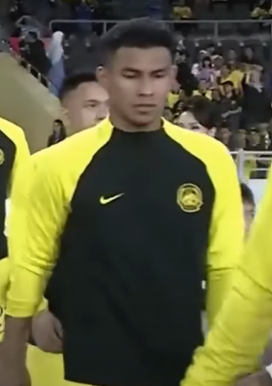
- Shahrul in 2023

Personal information
- Full name: Mohd Shahrul bin Mohd Saad
- Date of birth: 8 July 1993 (age 33)
- Place of birth: Ipoh, Perak, Malaysia
- Height: 1.78 m (5 ft 10 in)
- Positions: Centre-back; right-back

Team information
- Current team: Johor Darul Ta'zim
- Number: 3

Youth career
- 2008–2010: Perak President's Cup
- 2011–2014: Harimau Muda B / Harimau Muda A

Senior career*
Years	Team	Apps	(Gls)
2011	Harimau Muda B	17	(0)
2012–2014	Harimau Muda A	41	(0)
2015	Felda United	17	(1)
2016–2021	Perak	94	(9)
2021–	Johor Darul Ta'zim	49	(1)

International career^{‡}
2012–2015	Malaysia U23	27	(0)
2015–	Malaysia	64	(5)
Medal record
Men's football
Representing Malaysia U23
Merdeka Tournament
Winner	2013
Representing Malaysia
AFF Championship
Runner-up	2018
King's Cup
Runner-up	2022
- * Club domestic league appearances and goals as of 17 January 2026 ‡ National team caps and goals as of 14 October 2025

Mohd Shahrul bin Mohd Saad (Jawi: محمد شهرول بن محمد سعد, IPA: [mohd shahrul bɪn sa'ad]; born 8 July 1993) is a Malaysian professional footballer who plays as a centre-back for Malaysia Super League club Johor Darul Ta'zim and the Malaysia national team.

Shahrul has individually won 3 FAM Football Awards 'Best Defender Award' in 2018, 2019 and 2022.

== Club career ==
=== Youth ===
Shahrul started his career at Perak youth team. He was then transferred to Malaysia national youth setup and has played for Harimau Muda B in the 2011 Malaysia league and Harimau Muda A in the 2012 Singapore S.League. In 2014, he played 22 matches for Harimau Muda in the Australian National Premier Leagues.

=== Felda United ===
In 2015, Shahrul graduated from the national youth setup and was signed by Felda United. At Felda, he was converted from a defender to a defensive midfielder by head coach Irfan Bakti Abu Salim. He made his debut in the second match of 2015 Malaysia Super League against Sime Darby coming on from a bench in the 81st minute. He made his first start against Johor Darul Ta'zim on 3 May 2015 and become a regular until the end of the season. His only league goal for Felda was in the final league match against Johor Darul Ta'zim, where Felda won 2–1.

=== Perak ===
In 2016, Shahrul returned to his hometown club Perak where he won the 2018 Malaysia Cup with the club and finished as Malaysia Super League runners up in 2018, hence qualified to the AFC Champions League play-off round.

=== Johor Darul Ta'zim ===
On 8 May 2021, Shahrul joined Johor Darul Ta'zim. He was given the number 32 shirt. He made his debut against Sabah in the 2021 Malaysia Cup. He also scored his first goal for Johor Darul Ta'zim in the same competition against Kelantan.

In 2024, Shahrul changed his jersey number from no.32 to no.3 after Adam Nor Azlin left the club. He debuted in the no.3 jersey during a friendly match against Singapore side, Lion City Sailors on 4 April 2023 at Bishan Stadium. During the 2024 Malaysia FA Cup first leg match on 29 June 2024 against Malaysian University, Shahrul scored Johor Darul Ta'zim 1000th goal since being rebranded in 2013 scoring the fourth goal in 5–0 win.

== International career ==
=== Youth ===
In 2012, Shahrul made his debut for the Malaysia U23 team in the final match of 2012 Olympic qualifiers against Syria. He featured in two Southeast Asian Games (2013 and 2015) and 2014 Asian Games for the Malaysia national under-23 team. He was also a part of the 2013 Merdeka Tournament winning team and played for the 2013 Malaysia Universiade team.

=== Senior ===
Shahrul made his debut for Malaysia on 8 October 2015 in a 3–1 win against Laos.

On 10 September 2018, he scored his first international goal against Cambodia in a friendly.

He achieved his 50th cap against the Solomon Islands on 14 June 2023. On 20 June 2023 which was also his 51st cap, he was chosen as the captain for the Malaysia national team against Papua New Guinea.

Shahrul was also a member of the Malaysia squad at the 2023 AFC Asian Cup held in Qatar.

== Personal life ==
Shahrul has two older brothers who also have played professional football, Shahrizal Saad and Syamsul Saad. Like him, both brothers have played for Perak and Malaysia national team. Shahrul even played under Syamsul when his brother was the head coach of Perak in 2016.

From May to December 2023, Shahrul, along with Goh Sze Fei and Nur Dhabitah Sabri, was appointed as the brand ambassador for Nutrilite Malaysia.

== Career statistics ==
=== Club ===
As of match played 16 December 2023

Appearances and goals by club, season and competition
Club	Season	League			Cup		League Cup		Continental		Total	
Club	Season	Division	Apps	Goals	Apps	Goals	Apps	Goals	Apps	Goals	Apps	Goals
Harimau Muda B	2011	Malaysia Premier League	17	0	2 (Note: 1 appearances against Selangor in 2011 Malaysia FA Cup and 1 appearances against Hougang United in 2011 Singapore Cup.)	0	–		–		19	0
Harimau Muda B	Total		17	0	2	0	–		–		19	0
Harimau Muda A	2012	S.League	19	0	–		–		–		19	0
Harimau Muda A	2014	National Premier Leagues	22	0	–		–		–		22	0
Harimau Muda A	Total		41	0	–		–		–		41	0
Felda United	2015	Malaysia Super League	17	1	1	0	10	0	–		28	1
Felda United	Total		17	1	1	0	10	0	–		28	1
Perak	2016	Malaysia Super League	16	2	5	0	6	1	–		27	3
Perak	2017	Malaysia Super League	20	2	1	0	10	2	–		31	4
Perak	2018	Malaysia Super League	19	0	3	0	8	0	–		30	0
Perak	2019	Malaysia Super League	21	3	7	0	8	0	2	0	38	3
Perak	2020	Malaysia Super League	10	2	0	0	1	0	–		11	2
Perak	2021	Malaysia Super League	8	0	–		–		–		8	0
Perak	Total		94	9	16	0	33	3	2	0	145	12
Perak II	2021	Malaysia Premier League	1	0	–						1	0
Perak II	Total		1	0	–						1	0
Johor Darul Ta'zim	2021	Malaysia Super League	0	0	–		3	1	–		3	1
Johor Darul Ta'zim	2022	Malaysia Super League	20	0	5 (Note: 1 appearances in 2022 Piala Sumbangsih and 4 appearances in 2022 Malaysia FA Cup.)	0	6	1	6	0	37	1
Johor Darul Ta'zim	2023	Malaysia Super League	9	0	1	0	1	1	0	0	11	0
Johor Darul Ta'zim	Total		29	0	6	0	9	2	6	0	50	2
Career total			199	10	25	0	52	5	8	0	284	15

=== International ===
As of 14 October 2025

Appearances and goals by national team and year
National team	Year	Apps	Goals
Malaysia	2015	3	0
Malaysia	2016	8	0
Malaysia	2017	1	0
Malaysia	2018	15	2
Malaysia	2019	13	2
Malaysia	2020	–	
Malaysia	2021	3	1
Malaysia	2022	5	0
Malaysia	2023	6	0
Malaysia	2024	5	0
Malaysia	2025	5	0
Total		64	5

==== International goals ====
As of match played 8 June 2022. Malaysia score listed first, score column indicates score after each Shahrul Saad goal.

International goals by date, venue, cap, opponent, score, result and competition
No.	Date	Venue	Cap	Opponent	Score	Result	Competition
1	10 September 2018	Phnom Penh Olympic Stadium, Phnom Penh, Cambodia	17	Cambodia	1–1	3–1	Friendly
2	11 December 2018	Bukit Jalil National Stadium, Bukit Jalil, Malaysia	26	Vietnam	1–2	2–2	2018 AFF Championship
3	2 June 2019	Bukit Jalil National Stadium, Bukit Jalil, Malaysia	30	Nepal	1–0	2–0	Friendly
4	5 October 2019	Bukit Jalil National Stadium, Bukit Jalil, Malaysia	36	Sri Lanka	2–0	6–0	Friendly
5	9 December 2021	Bishan Stadium, Bishan, Singapore	38	Laos	3–0	4–0	2020 AFF Championship

== Honours ==
=== Club ===
Perak

- Malaysia Super League runner-up: 2018
- Malaysia Cup: 2018
- Malaysia FA Cup runner-up: 2019
- Malaysia Charity Shield Runner-up: 2019

Johor Darul Ta'zim

- Malaysia Super League: 2021, 2022, 2023, 2024–25
- Malaysia FA Cup: 2022, 2023, 2024
- Malaysia Cup: 2022, 2023, 2024–25
- Malaysia Charity Shield: 2022, 2023, 2024, 2025

=== International ===
Malaysia U23

- Merdeka Tournament: 2013

Malaysia

- AFF Championship runner-up: 2018

=== Individual ===
- Malaysia Super League Best Defender: 2018, 2019, 2022
