= Danish Haziq =

Malaysian footballer

Personal information
- Full name: Muhamad Danish Haziq bin Saipul Hisham
- Date of birth: 12 September 1997 (age 29)
- Place of birth: Seremban, Malaysia
- Height: 1.71 m (5 ft 7 in)
- Position: Right-back

Team information
- Current team: Immigration FC II
- Number: 59

Youth career
- Harimau Muda C
- 2016–2018: Negeri Sembilan

Senior career*
Years	Team	Apps	(Gls)
2019	Negeri Sembilan	2	(0)
2020	UiTM	7	(0)
2021–2023	Perak	19	(0)
2023–2024	→ Penang (loan)		
2024–2025	Gombak		

International career
2015–2016	Malaysia U19	8	(1)
- * Club domestic league appearances and goals

Muhamad Danish Haziq bin Saipul Hisham (born 12 September 1997) is a Malaysian professional footballer who plays as a right-back.

== Club career ==
After playing for UiTM in the 2020 Malaysia Super League, Danish moved to Perak for the 2021 season.

== International career ==
Danish captained the Malaysia national under-19 team. In 2019, he was called up for the under-23 team.
