= Nazirul Afif =

Malaysian association football player

Personal information
- Full name: Muhammad Nazirul Afif bin Ibrahim
- Date of birth: 30 April 1997 (age 29)
- Place of birth: Perak, Malaysia
- Position: Right-back

Team information
- Current team: Perak FC
- Number: 27

Youth career
- Perak

Senior career*
| Years | Team | Apps | (Gls) |
| 2019– | Perak | 0 | (0) |
| 2019– | → Perak FC II (loan) | 11 | (0) |

International career^{‡}
| 2013–2014 | Malaysia U17 | | |
| 2014–2016 | Malaysia U20 | | |
| 2018–2019 | Malaysia U22 | | |
- * Club domestic league appearances and goals as of 21 July 2019 ‡ National team caps and goals as of 21 July 2019

Muhammad Nazirul Afif bin Ibrahim (born 30 April 1997) is a Malaysian footballer who plays as a right-back for Malaysian Super League club Perak FC.
