= Zulkiffli Zakaria =

Malaysian footballer

Personal information
- Full name: Mohd Zulkiffli bin Zakaria
- Date of birth: 22 February 1997 (age 29)
- Place of birth: Kelantan, Malaysia
- Height: 1.76 m (5 ft 9 1/2 in)
- Position: Midfielder

Team information
- Current team: Perak
- Number: 22

Youth career
- 2017: UiTM

Senior career*
Years	Team	Apps	(Gls)
2019–2020	UiTM	5	(1)
2021–	Perak	4	(0)
2021	→ Perak II (loan)	3	(2)
2022	Kelantan United	5	(0)
2023	Harini F.C.	0	(0)
- * Club domestic league appearances and goals as of 26 March 2023

Mohd Zulkiffli bin Zakaria (born 22 February 1997) is a Malaysian professional footballer who plays as a midfielder for Malaysia Super League club Perak.
