= Farid Khazali =

Malaysian footballer

Personal information
- Full name: Mohammad Farid bin Khazali
- Date of birth: 31 March 1998 (age 28)
- Place of birth: Ipoh, Malaysia
- Position: Winger

Youth career
- 2019: Perak

Senior career*
Years	Team	Apps	(Gls)
2020	Perak	21	(3)
2021–2022	→ Perak II (loan)	5	(1)
2023	Melaka		
2024–2025	Bunga Raya Damansara		
- * Club domestic league appearances and goals

Mohammad Farid bin Khazali (born 31 March 1998) is a Malaysian professional footballer who plays as a winger.

== Club career ==
=== Perak ===
Farid began his career with Perak's youth team before been promoted to first team in 2020. On 11 March 2020, he made his Malaysia Super League debut for Perak in a 2–0 win over Petaling Jaya City.
