= Pavithran Selladoria =

Malaysian association football player

S. Pavithran
Personal information
- Full name: Pavithran a/l K. Selladoria
- Date of birth: 14 September 1994 (age 32)
- Place of birth: Negeri Sembilan, Malaysia
- Position: Defender

Team information
- Current team: Perak
- Number: 25

Senior career*
Years	Team	Apps	(Gls)
2016	Young Fighters	0	(0)
2017	MOF	0	(0)
2020–	Perak II	11	(0)
2021–	Perak	2	(0)
- * Club domestic league appearances and goals as of 4 August 2021

Pavithran a/l K. Selladoria (born 14 September 1994) is a Malaysian footballer who plays as a defender for Perak in the Malaysia Super League.
