= Nazmi Ahmad =

Malaysian footballer

Personal information
- Full name: Muhammad Nazmi bin Ahmad
- Date of birth: 22 February 1998 (age 28)
- Place of birth: Perak, Malaysia
- Height: 1.89 m (6 ft 2 in)
- Position: Centre-back

Team information
- Current team: Perak
- Number: 42

Youth career
- –2019: Perak

Senior career*
Years	Team	Apps	(Gls)
2020–2022	Perak	8	(2)
2020	→ Perak II (loan)	5	(1)
2021	→ Perak II (loan)	9	(1)
- * Club domestic league appearances and goals as of 7 August 2021

Muhammad Nazmi bin Ahmad (born 22 February 1998) is a Malaysian footballer who plays as a centre-back for Perak.

== Career statistics ==
=== Club ===
As of 7 August 2021

Appearances and goals by club, season and competition
Club	Season	League			Cup		League Cup		Continental		Total	
Club	Season	Division	Apps	Goals	Apps	Goals	Apps	Goals	Apps	Goals	Apps	Goals
Perak	2021	Malaysia Super League	1	0	—		0	0	—		1	0
Perak	Total		1	0	0	0	0	0	0	0	1	0
Career total			1	0	0	0	0	0	0	0	1	0
