= Nasrullah Aziz =

Malaysian footballer

Personal information
- Full name: Mohammad Nasrullah bin Abdul Aziz
- Date of birth: 17 December 1997 (age 28)
- Place of birth: Bagan Datuk, Malaysia
- Height: 1.81 m (5 ft 11 1/2 in)
- Position: Goalkeeper

Team information
- Current team: Manjung City
- Number: 1

Youth career
- 2017–2018: Perak

Senior career*
Years	Team	Apps	(Gls)
2018–2022	Perak	7	(0)
2022	Respect		
2023–2024	Melaka		
2024	Bukit Tambun		
2025–	Manjung City		
- * Club domestic league appearances and goals

Mohammad Nasrullah bin Abdul Aziz (born 17 December 1997) is a Malaysian professional footballer who plays as a goalkeeper for Malaysia A1 Semi-Pro League club Manjung City.
