= Idris Ahmad (footballer) =

Malaysian footballer

Personal information
- Full name: Mohd Idris bin Ahmad
- Date of birth: 5 May 1990 (age 36)
- Place of birth: Ijok, Selangor, Malaysia
- Height: 1.77 m (5 ft 9 1/2 in)
- Position: Defender

Senior career*
Years	Team	Apps	(Gls)
2011–2014	PKNS	21	(0)
2015–2016	Felda United	4	(0)
2017–2022	Perak	51	(0)
2023–2024	Melaka		
2024–2025	PIB		
- * Club domestic league appearances and goals

Mohd Idris bin Ahmad (born 5 May 1990) is a Malaysian professional footballer who plays as a defender.

== Club career ==
=== Perak ===
In 2017, Idris signed a contract with Malaysia Super League club Perak.Yessir he did

== Career statistics ==
=== Club ===
As of 28 July 2018

Appearances and goals by club, season and competition
Club	Season	League			Cup		League Cup		Continental		Total	
Club	Season	Division	Apps	Goals	Apps	Goals	Apps	Goals	Apps	Goals	Apps	Goals
Felda United	2015	Malaysia Super League	0	0	0	0	0	0	–		0	0
Felda United	2016	Malaysia Super League	4	0	2	0	?	0	–		6	0
Felda United	Total		4	0	2	0	?	0	–		6	0
Perak	2017	Malaysia Super League	5	0	1	0	1	0	–		7	0
Perak	2018	Malaysia Super League	10	0	1	0	0	0	–		11	0
Perak	Total		15	0	2	0	1	0	–		18	0
Career Total			0	0	0	0	0	0	–	–	0	0
