= 2025–26 Kedah FA season =

Kedah FA
2025-26 season
- Owner: Kedah FA state football team
- President: Muhammad Sanusi Md Nor
- Head coach: Victor Andrag
- Stadium: Darul Aman Stadium (Capacity: 32,387)
- Malaysia A1 Semi-Pro League: 3rd
- Top goalscorer: League: Aiman Afif; 10 goals All: Aiman Afif; 10 goals

The 2025-26 season is Kedah FA's 1st season in the Malaysia A1 Semi-Pro League since the league's inception in 2019.

== Club officials ==
Position	Name
Manager	(Malaysia) Dato Wira Syed Khairul Anuar
Assistant Manager	(Malaysia) Haji Zulzuraidy Othman
Head coach	(Malaysia) Victor Andrag
Assistant coach	(Malaysia) Mohamad Rizal Johari
Fitness Coach	(Malaysia) Mohammad Zulkifli Jaafar
Goalkeeper coach	(Malaysia) S. Rajesh (Malaysia) Helmi Eliza
Team Doctor	(Malaysia) Dr. Mohd Fakhrulsani
Physiotherapy	(Malaysia) Muhammad Nur'Illya Samsudin
Kitman	(Malaysia) Anizar Hussein (Malaysia) Taufiq Ahmad Mahar
Team admin	(Malaysia) Fiqkry Md Isa
Media officer	(Malaysia) Muhammad Nazim Uzir

== Players ==
As of February 2026

Note: Flags indicate national team as defined under FIFA eligibility rules; some limited exceptions apply. Players may hold more than one non-FIFA nationality.

No.	Pos.	Nation	Player
1	GK	MAS	Norfahmi Zaki
2	DF	MAS	Safwan Shuhaimi
4	MF	MAS	Asnan Ahmad
7	MF	MAS	Zhafir Yusoff
8	DF	MAS	Muhammad Azim Anuar
11	DF	MAS	Afzal Akbar
12	MF	MAS	R. Barathkumar
13	DF	MAS	Aiman Farhan Fauzi
14	MF	MAS	Afif Dinie Salmi
16	GK	MAS	Rajendran Veloo
17	FW	MAS	Hijjaz Hakimi Romdan
18	MF	MAS	Akmal Hakim Rosli
19	FW	MAS	Aiman Afif
20	DF	MAS	Muhammad Ammar
21	MF	MAS	Muhammad Danial Tarmizi

No.	Pos.	Nation	Player
22	MF	MAS	Rahmat Makasuf
23	MF	MAS	Jasmir Mehat
26	FW	MAS	Shahmeer Rusli
26	GK	MAS	Muhammad Alfaiz
28	MF	MAS	Aizat Najmie
29	FW	MAS	Afeeq Iqmal
30	FW	MAS	Nabil Latpi
31	FW	MAS	T. Sasvintharan
32	DF	MAS	Aqil Irfanuddin
33	FW	MAS	Muhammad Isa Raman
44	DF	SEN	Papé Diakité (captain)
66	DF	MAS	Kamil Akmal Halim
80	DF	MAS	A. Namathevan
88	MF	GHA	Yakubu Abubakar
90	FW	NGR	Chukwu Nnabuike Chijioke

== Transfers and contracts ==
=== Transfers in ===
Pre-season

Position	Player	Transferred from	Ref
GK	(Malaysia) Muhaimin Mohamad	(Malaysia) Negeri Sembilan	Free
DF	(Malaysia) Kamil Akmal	(Malaysia) Kedah Darul Aman	Free
DF	(Malaysia) Aiman Farhan	(Malaysia) Kedah Darul Aman	Free
MF	(Malaysia) Aiman Afif	(Malaysia) Kedah Darul Aman	Free
MF	(Malaysia) Afzal Akbar	(Malaysia) Kelantan Darul Naim	Free
FW	(Malaysia) Nabil Latpi	(Malaysia) Penang	Free

=== Loans in ===
Pre-season

Position	Player	Transferred from	Ref
	TBD	TBD	

=== Transfers out ===
Pre-season

Position	Player	Transferred to	Ref
	TBD	TBD	

== Competitions ==
=== Overview ===
Competition	First match	Last match	Starting round	Final position	Record							
Competition	First match	Last match	Starting round	Final position	Pld	W	D	L	GF	GA	GD	Win %
Malaysia A1 Semi-Pro League	2 August 2025	23 May 2026	Matchday 1	3rd	28	17	6	5	46	16	+30	60.71
Total					28	17	6	5	46	16	+30	60.71

Source: Competitions

=== Malaysia A1 Semi-Pro League ===
Locations of teams in the 2025–26 Malaysia A1 Semi-Pro
Klang Valley

Pos	Team	Pld	W	D	L	GF	GA	GD	Pts	Qualification or relegation
1	Johor Darul Ta'zim II (C)	28	19	6	3	64	17	+47	63	Ineligible for promotion (Note: Parent team in Malaysia Super League / developmental team)
2	Selangor II	28	19	4	5	63	20	+43	61	Ineligible for promotion
3	Kedah FA (Note: Did not apply for a national license)	28	17	6	5	46	16	+30	57	
4	Kelantan Red Warrior (X)	28	17	5	6	64	15	+49	56	Qualified to the 2026 Malaysia Cup & promotion to the 2026–27 Malaysia Super League
5	Perak FA (Note: Did not apply for a national license) (X)	28	15	10	3	50	18	+32	55	Qualified to the 2026 Malaysia Cup

Updated to match(es) played on 24 May 2026. Source: AFL
Rules for classification: 1) Points; 2) Goal difference; 3) Number of goals scored.
(C) League champion; (X) Qualified to the 2026 Malaysia Cup

==== Fixtures and results ====
Win Draw Loss

2 August 2025 1	Perlis GSA	0-0	Kedah FA	Kangar
20:45 UTC+08:00				Stadium: Tuanku Syed Putra Stadium

9 August 2025 2	Perak FA	0-0	Kedah FA	Manjung
16:45 UTC+08:00		Report		Stadium: Manjung Stadium; Attendance: 605; Referee: Anselm Anak Enterang

25 August 2025 3	Johor Darul Ta'zim II	v	Kedah FA	Pasir Gudang
20:45 UTC+08:00				Stadium: Pasir Gudang Corporation Stadium
