= 2026–27 Kedah FA season =

Kedah FA
2026-27 season
- Owner: Kedah FA state football team
- President: Muhammad Sanusi Md Nor
- Head coach: Akmal Rizal
- Stadium: Darul Aman Stadium (Capacity: 32,387)

The 2026-27 season is Kedah FA's 2nd season in the Malaysia A1 Semi-Pro League since the league's inception in 2019.

== Club officials ==
As of 28 August 2026

Position	Name
President	(Malaysia) Muhammad Sanusi Md Nor
Manager	(Malaysia) Baddrol Bakhtiar
Head coach	(Malaysia) Akmal Rizal
Assistant coach	(Malaysia) Mohamad Rizal Johari
Goalkeeper coach	(Malaysia) S. Ragesh
Assistant goalkeeper coach	(Malaysia) Helmi Eliza
Fitness coach	(Malaysia) Mohd Zulkifli Jaafar
Team doctor	(Malaysia) Mohd Fakhrulsani Abdul Hamid
Physiotherapy	(Malaysia) Muhammad Nur'Illya Samsudin
Team Admin	(Malaysia) Fiqkry Md Isa
Kitman	(Malaysia) Anizar Hussein (Malaysia) Taufiq Ahmad Mahar

== Players ==
=== Current squad ===
As of August 2026

Note: Flags indicate national team as defined under FIFA eligibility rules; some limited exceptions apply. Players may hold more than one non-FIFA nationality.

No.	Pos.	Nation	Player
1	GK	MAS	Muhammad Ashraf Fadhil
2	DF	MAS	Safwan Shuhaimi
3	DF	MAS	Hazrie Balqief
4	MF	MAS	Asnan Ahmad
6	DF	MAS	Kamil Akmal Halim
8	DF	MAS	Muhammad Azim Anuar
11	DF	MAS	Afzal Akbar
12	MF	MAS	R. Barathkumar
13	DF	MAS	Aiman Farhan Fauzi
14	MF	MAS	Afif Dinie Salmi
16	GK	MAS	Rajendran Veloo
17	FW	MAS	Shahmeer Rusli
18	MF	MAS	Akmal Hakim Rosli

No.	Pos.	Nation	Player
19	FW	MAS	Aiman Afif
20	DF	MAS	Muhammad Ammar
21	MF	MAS	Muhammad Danial Tarmizi
22	MF	MAS	Rahmat Makasuf
23	MF	MAS	Jasmir Mehat
25	GK	MAS	Norfahmi Zaki
27	MF	MAS	Muhammad Idrzuwan Daud
28	MF	MAS	Aizat Najmie
29	FW	MAS	Afeeq Iqmal
30	FW	MAS	Nabil Latpi
32	DF	MAS	Aqil Irfanuddin
49	MF	MAS	Zhafir Yusoff

== Competitions ==
=== Overview ===
Competition	First match	Last match	Starting round	Final position	Record							
Competition	First match	Last match	Starting round	Final position	Pld	W	D	L	GF	GA	GD	Win %
Malaysia A1 Semi-Pro League	29 August 2026		Matchday 1		2	0	1	1	2	4	−2	0.00
Malaysia FA Cup	2 September 2026	8 September 2026	Round of 16	Round of 16	2	0	1	1	2	4	−2	0.00
Malaysia Cup					0	0	0	0	0	0	+0	—
Total					4	0	2	2	4	8	−4	0.00

Last updated: 8 September 2026
Source: Competitions

=== Malaysia A1 Semi-Pro League ===
Locations of teams in the 2026–27 Malaysia A1 Semi-Pro
Klang Valley

Pos	Team	Pld	W	D	L	GF	GA	GD	Pts	Qualification or relegation
9	USM	4	2	0	2	6	9	−3	6	
10	Bunga Raya	4	2	0	2	6	10	−4	6	
11	Kedah FA	4	1	2	1	5	5	0	5	
12	Malaysian University	4	1	1	2	6	11	−5	4	
13	Negeri Sembilan II	4	1	0	3	5	7	−2	3	Relegation to the 2027–28 Malaysia A2 Amateur League

Updated to match(es) played on 27 Sep 2026. Source: AFL
Rules for classification: 1) Points; 2) Goal difference; 3) Number of goals scored.
