= List of Malaysian football first transfers 2023 =

This is a list of Malaysian football transfers for the 2023 first transfer window. Only transfers featuring Malaysia Super League and Malaysia M3 League are listed.

== Malaysia Super League ==
=== Johor Darul Ta'zim ===
In:

No.	Pos.	Nation	Player
—	GK	(Malaysia) MAS	Syihan Hazmi (from Negeri Sembilan)
—	FW	(Spain) ESP	Juan Muñiz (from (Greece) Atromitos)
—	FW	(Philippines) PHI	Óscar Arribas (from (Spain) Cartagena)
—	FW	(Brazil) BRA	Diogo (from (Thailand) BG Pathum United)

Out:

No.	Pos.	Nation	Player
—	GK	(Malaysia) MAS	T. Shaheeswaran (to Negeri Sembilan)
—	GK	(Malaysia) MAS	Rozaimi Rahamat (to Kelantan)
—	DF	(Philippines) PHI	Carli de Murga (to Kelantan)
—	DF	(Malaysia) MAS	Fadhli Shas (to Sri Pahang)
—	MF	(Malaysia) MAS	Danial Haqim (to Sabah)
—	MF	(Malaysia) MAS	Firdaus Kaironnisam (to Sabah)
—	MF	(Malaysia) MAS	Stuart Wilkin (to Sabah)
—	MF	(Malaysia) MAS	Junior Eldstål (to (Thailand) PT Prachuap)
—	FW	(Argentina) ARG	Jonathan Herrera (to (Argentina) Ferro Carril Oeste)

=== Kelantan ===
In:

No.	Pos.	Nation	Player
—	FW	(Malaysia) MAS	Farhan Roslan (loan return from Sabah)
—	MF	(Malaysia) MAS	Mior Dani (loan return from Sri Pahang)
—	FW	(Indonesia) IDN	Natanael Siringoringo (loan return from (Indonesia) Dewa United)
—	GK	(Malaysia) MAS	Rozaimi Rahamat (from Johor Darul Ta'zim II)
—	DF	(Malaysia) MAS	Gerald Gadit (on loan from Sabah)
—	DF	(South Korea) KOR	Kim Min-kyu (from (Hong Kong) Rangers)
—	FW	(Malaysia) MAS	Shafiq Shaharudin (from Kuala Lumpur Rovers)
—	MF	(Malaysia) MAS	Faiz Mazlan (on loan from Penang)
—	MF	(South Korea) KOR	Kang Yi-chan (from (South Korea) Gangwon)
—	FW	(The Gambia) GAM	Nuha Marong (from (India) Rajasthan United)
—	MF	(Philippines) PHI	Andreas Esswein (from (Philippines) United City)
—	MF	(Spain) ESP	Mario Arqués (from (Vietnam) Song Lam Nghe An)
—	GK	(Malaysia) MAS	Farhan Abu Bakar (from Kuala Lumpur Rovers)
—	MF	(Malaysia) MAS	Khairil Anuar (from Sarawak United)
—	FW	(Malaysia) MAS	Leslee Jesunathan (from Petaling Jaya City)
—	FW	(Malaysia) MAS	Afzal Akbar (from UiTM)
—	DF	(Malaysia) MAS	Afiq Azuan (from Harini)
—	DF	(Philippines) PHI	Christian Rontini (from Penang)
—	DF	(Spain) ESP	Cifu (from (Spain) Ibiza)
—	FW	(Nigeria) NGA	Ismahil Akinade (from (Bangladesh) Sheikh Russel)
—	DF	(Philippines) PHI	Carli de Murga (from Johor Darul Ta'zim)
—	MF	(Argentina) ARG	Leonardo Rolón (from (Argentina) Mitre)

Out:

No.	Pos.	Nation	Player
—	DF	(Malaysia) MAS	Latiff Suhaimi (loan return to Penang)
—	MF	(Malaysia) MAS	Mior Dani (loan to Kedah Darul Aman)
—	FW	(Japan) JPN	Kenta Hara
—	FW	(Brazil) BRA	Nixon Guylherme
—	MF	(Brazil) BRA	Felipe Hereda (to (Brazil) Democrata)
—	DF	(Malaysia) MAS	Zubir Azmi
—	DF	(Malaysia) MAS	Adam Nadzmi
—	MF	(Malaysia) MAS	Adam Malique (to Sri Pahang)
—	GK	(Malaysia) MAS	Asfa Abidin
—	GK	(Malaysia) MAS	Amin Faisal
—	MF	(Malaysia) MAS	Jasmir Mehat
—	FW	(Malaysia) MAS	Farhan Roslan (to Sabah)
—	MF	(Malaysia) MAS	Syed Sobri
—	MF	(Malaysia) MAS	Dzulfahmi Hadi (to PDRM)
—	FW	(Malaysia) MAS	Alifh Aiman (to PDRM)
—	GK	(Malaysia) MAS	Solehin Mamat
—	MF	(Malaysia) MAS	Shyamierul Razmee (to PDRM)
—	MF	(Malaysia) MAS	Azrie Basalie
—	MF	(Malaysia) MAS	Shahrul Igwan
—	DF	(Malaysia) MAS	Danial Hadri
—	DF	(Malaysia) MAS	Osman Yusoff
—	MF	(Malaysia) MAS	Shafiq Al-Hafiz (to Penang)
—	MF	(Malaysia) MAS	Mathias Mansor (to Sarawak United)
