= 2024–25 Kelantan Darul Naim F.C. season =

Kelantan Darul Naim
2024–25 season
- President: Rozi Muhamad
- CEO: Irwan Rizal
- Head coach: Park Jae-hong (until 25 January 2025); Rezal Zambery (interim)
- Stadium: Sultan Muhammad IV Stadium
- Malaysia Super League: 13th
- Malaysia FA Cup: Round of 16
- Malaysia Cup: Round of 16
- MFL Challenge Cup: Quarter-finals
- Top goalscorer: League: Oday Kharoub (4); All: Oday Kharoub (4)
Home colours	Away colours	Third colours

The 2024–25 season was the ninth season in the history of Kelantan Darul Naim F.C., and the club's second consecutive season in Malaysia Super League. In addition to the domestic league, the team participated in the Malaysia FA Cup, the Malaysia Cup and the MFL Challenge Cup.

== Coaching staff ==
Position	Name	Nationality
Head coach	Park Jae-hong	South Korea
Assistant head coach	Kamaruddin Muhammad	Malaysia
Assistant head coach	Rezal Zambery	Malaysia
Assistant coach	Hafizi Awang	Malaysia
Assistant coach	Farisham Ismail	Malaysia
Assistant coach	Zairul Fitree Ishak	Malaysia
Assistant coach	Ashadi Mohd Yusoff	Malaysia
Fitness coach	Fazrul Jaafar	Malaysia
Fitness coach	Mohd Hafezi Mat Zain	Malaysia
Team doctor	Muhammad Faiz Affandi	Malaysia
Physiotherapist	Amir Fadzlan	Malaysia

== Competitions ==
=== Malaysia Super League ===
11 May 2024 1	Sri Pahang	1–0	Kelantan Darul Naim
		Report

17 May 2024 2	Kelantan Darul Naim	2–3	Sabah
	Kim Li-Kwan 55'; Bae Kyung-Hwang 90+1'	Report

24 May 2024 3	Terengganu	3–0	Kelantan Darul Naim
		Report

23 June 2024 4	Kelantan Darul Naim	1–0	PDRM
	Oday Kharoub 29' (pen.)	Report

12 July 2024 5	Kedah Darul Aman	3–0	Kelantan Darul Naim
		Report

26 July 2024 6	Kelantan Darul Naim	1–3	Perak
	Syahir Rashid 87'	Report

1 August 2024 7	Penang	3–0	Kelantan Darul Naim
		Report

10 August 2024 8	Selangor	2–0	Kelantan Darul Naim
		Report

26 August 2024 9	Kuching City	1–0	Kelantan Darul Naim
		Report

22 September 2024 10	Kelantan Darul Naim	1–6	Johor Darul Ta'zim
		Report

27 September 2024 11	Negeri Sembilan	2–3	Kelantan Darul Naim
		Report	Hakimi Abdullah 14'; Kim Li-Kwan 37'; Oday Kharoub 90+4'

18 October 2024 12	Kelantan Darul Naim	1–3	Kuala Lumpur City
	Washington Brandão 57'	Report

25 October 2024 13	Kelantan Darul Naim	1–1	Sri Pahang
	Oday Kharoub 22'	Report

13 November 2024 14	Sabah	4–1	Kelantan Darul Naim
		Report	Fazrul Amir 27'

4 December 2024 15	Kelantan Darul Naim	1–2	Terengganu
	Oday Kharoub 90+5' (pen.)	Report

18 December 2024 16	PDRM	5–0	Kelantan Darul Naim
		Report

10 January 2025 17	Kelantan Darul Naim	0–1	Kedah Darul Aman
		Report

26 January 2025 18	Perak	7–0	Kelantan Darul Naim
		Report

7 February 2025 19	Kelantan Darul Naim	1–6	Penang
	Syahir Rashid 34'	Report

26 February 2025 20	Kelantan Darul Naim	0–3	Kuching City
		Report

8 March 2025 21	Kelantan Darul Naim	0–7	Selangor
		Report

10 April 2025 22	Johor Darul Ta'zim	9–0	Kelantan Darul Naim
		Report

13 April 2025 23	Kelantan Darul Naim	1–2	Negeri Sembilan
		Report

20 April 2025 24	Kuala Lumpur City	5–2	Kelantan Darul Naim
		Report

Pos	Team	Pld	W	D	L	GF	GA	GD	Pts	Qualification or relegation
9	PDRM	24	7	6	11	24	35	−11	27	
10	Penang	24	6	8	10	31	38	−7	26	
11	Kedah Darul Aman (Note: MFL officially snubs Kedah Darul Aman club licensing approval.)	24	6	6	12	21	51	−30	21 (Note: On 5 April 2024, Kedah Darul Aman were deducted three points for failing to pay players and staff on time following previous MFL rules breaches in the 2023 season.)	Ejected from Super League and relegated to A1 Semi-Pro League
12	Negeri Sembilan	24	4	4	16	23	49	−26	16	
13	Kelantan Darul Naim	24	2	1	21	16	82	−66	7	

Source: MFL
Rules for classification: 1) Points; 2) Goal difference; 3) Goals scored;

=== Malaysia FA Cup ===
15 June 2024 Round of 16	Johor Darul Ta'zim	4–0	Kelantan Darul Naim
		Report

=== Malaysia Cup ===
==== Round of 16 ====
22 November 2024 1st leg	Kelantan Darul Naim	0–3	Perak
		Report

30 November 2024 2nd leg	Perak	3–1 (6–1 agg.)	Kelantan Darul Naim
		Report	Adam Danial 84'

=== MFL Challenge Cup ===
==== Quarter-finals ====
12 December 2024 1st leg	Kelantan Darul Naim	1–5	Selangor
21:00	Arip 71'	Report

== Squad statistics ==
As of match played 20 April 2025

Players with no appearances are not included on the list
Italics indicate a loaned in player

No.	Pos	Nat	Player	Total		Malaysia Super League		Malaysia FA Cup		Malaysia Cup		MFL Challenge Cup	
No.	Pos	Nat	Player	Apps	Goals	Apps	Goals	Apps	Goals	Apps	Goals	Apps	Goals
1	GK	(Malaysia) MAS	Alfaiz Zula'amin	9	0	7+1	0	0	0	0	0	1	0
2	DF	(Malaysia) MAS	Arip Amiruddin	9	1	6+2	0	0	0	0	0	1	1
4	DF	(Malaysia) MAS	Ghaffar Abdul Rahman	23	0	20	0	1	0	2	0		
5	DF	(Malaysia) MAS	Muhammad Faudzi	8	0	3+3	0	0	0	0	0	2	0
7	MF	(Malaysia) MAS	Asraff Aliffuddin	16	0	8+5	0	1	0	1	0	1	0
8	MF	(Malaysia) MAS	Syed Sobri	5	0	1+2	0	0	0	0+1	0	1	0
11	DF	(Malaysia) MAS	Afzal Akbar	17	0	10+3	0	0	0	0+2	0	1+1	0
12	MF	(Malaysia) MAS	Amirul Shafik Che Soh	15	0	3+9	0	0+1	0	0+2	0		
13	FW	(Malaysia) MAS	Fazli Ghazali	3	0	3	0	0	0	0	0		
14	DF	(Malaysia) MAS	Nasrol Amri	5	0	1+3	0	1	0	0	0		
15	MF	(Malaysia) MAS	Zuasyraf Zulkiefle	19	0	9+7	0	0+1	0	1	0	0+1	0
16	MF	(Malaysia) MAS	Jasmir Mehat	16	0	9+4	0	0	0	1	0	2	0
17	MF	(Malaysia) MAS	Fazrul Amir	25	2	14+7	2	1	0	2	0	1	0
19	MF	(Malaysia) MAS	Irwan Syazmin	20	0	12+4	0	1	0	1+1	0	1	0
20	MF	(Malaysia) MAS	Faizal Talib	5	0	2+3	0	0	0	0	0		
21	MF	(Malaysia) MAS	Umeir Aznan	19	0	7+8	0	1	0	2	0	1	0
25	MF	(Malaysia) MAS	Syahir Rashid	24	2	14+6	2	0	0	2	0	2	0
28	MF	(Malaysia) MAS	Mior Dani	14	0	7+4	0	1	0	0+2	0		
29	DF	(Malaysia) MAS	Hafizal Mohamad	14	0	10+3	0	0	0	1	0		
30	GK	(Malaysia) MAS	Muhaimin Mohamad	3	0	2	0	1	0	0	0		
31	MF	(Malaysia) MAS	Haziq Subri	4	0	0+2	0	0	0	0+2	0		
33	FW	(Malaysia) MAS	Adam Danial	16	2	8+5	1	0	0	1	1	1+1	0
38	FW	(Malaysia) MAS	Aqil Hussni	1	0	0+1	0	0	0	0	0		
39	GK	(Malaysia) MAS	Fikri Che Soh	13	0	9+1	0	0	0	2	0	1	0
40	DF	(Malaysia) MAS	Fahrurrozi Suhirman	5	0	3+2	0	0	0	0	0		
44	MF	(Malaysia) MAS	Adam Basyir	2	0	1+1	0	0	0	0	0		
50	FW	(United States) USA	Johan Muliadi	3	0	0+2	0	0	0	0	0	0+1	0
61	MF	(Malaysia) MAS	Hakimi Abdullah	18	1	13+1	1	0	0	1+1	0	2	0
66	DF	(Malaysia) MAS	Fakhrul Che Ramli	4	0	1+1	0	0	0	0	0	0+2	0
72	MF	(Malaysia) MAS	Danial Aiman	1	0	0+1	0	0	0	0	0		
78	DF	(Malaysia) MAS	Aqif Asyraaf	8	0	5+1	0	0	0	0	0	1+1	0
79	MF	(Malaysia) MAS	Amjad Huzeny	5	0	1+3	0	0	0	0	0	0+1	0
88	MF	(Malaysia) MAS	Muhaimin Izuddin	4	0	3+1	0	0	0	0	0		
92	DF	(Malaysia) MAS	Syaqimi Rozi	1	0	0+1	0	0	0	0	0		
93	DF	(Malaysia) MAS	Effizul Haikal	1	0	0+1	0	0	0	0	0		
96	MF	(Malaysia) MAS	Sabri Rahman	1	0	0+1	0	0	0	0	0		
97	MF	(Malaysia) MAS	Nazmi Haikal	1	0	0+1	0	0	0	0	0		
Players away on loan:
Players who featured but departed the club permanently during the season:
3	DF	(South Korea) KOR	Kim Li-Kwan	12	2	11	2	1	0	0	0		
6	MF	(Palestine) PLE	Oday Kharoub	18	4	13+1	4	1	0	2	0	1	0
9	FW	(Guinea-Bissau) GNB	Valdu Té	9	0	7+1	0	1	0	0	0		
10	FW	(Democratic Republic of the Congo) COD	Chadrack Lukombe	5	0	3+1	0	0+1	0	0	0		
9	FW	(Brazil) BRA	Washington Brandão	8	1	6+1	1	0	0	0	0	1	0
10	FW	(Palestine) PLE	Layth Kharoub	4	1	3	1	0	0	1	0		
18	DF	(Czech Republic) CZE	Michal Jeřábek	16	0	13	0	0	0	2	0	1	0
22	GK	(Malaysia) MAS	Khatul Anuar	6	0	6	0	0	0	0	0		
23	FW	(Bolivia) BOL	David Ribera	2	0	0+2	0	0	0	0	0		
24	FW	(South Korea) KOR	Bae Kyung-Hwan	8	1	3+5	1	0	0	0	0		
26	FW	(South Korea) KOR	Goo Ah-hwoi	0	0	0	0	0	0	0	0		
27	MF	(South Korea) KOR	Byung Ju-Jung	2	0	2	0	0	0	0	0		
47	MF	(Myanmar) MYA	Aung Kaung Mann	4	0	4	0	0	0	0	0		
