= 2023 Kelantan F.C. season =

Kelantan
- Owner: Norizam Tukiman
- Head coach: Choi Moon-sik (until 4 April); Rezal Zambery Yahya (caretaker); Frank Bernhardt (from 9 April)
- Stadium: Sultan Muhammad IV Stadium
- Malaysia Super League: 14th
- Malaysia FA Cup: Quarter-final
- Malaysia Cup: Round of 16
- Top goalscorer: League: Leonardo Rolón (5); All: Ismahil Akinade (6)
- Highest home attendance: 6,011 vs Penang, Malaysia Super League, 5 March 2023
- Average home league attendance: 5,574
- Biggest defeat: 2–11 vs Selangor F.C., Malaysia Super League, 25 August 2023
Home colours	Away colours	Third colours
- All statistics correct as of 26 January 2023.

The 2023 season is the 78th season in the existence of Kelantan Football Club. It will be the club's first campaign back in the Malaysia Super League since 2018 following their promotion from the previous season. In addition to the league, they will also compete in the Malaysia FA Cup and the Malaysia Cup.

On 13 January 2023, Choi Moon-sik has been appointed as club's new head coach.

== Management team ==
Position	Name
Manager	(Malaysia) Qusmaini Noor Rusli
Head coach	(Germany) Frank Bernhardt
Assistant head coach	(Malaysia) Rezal Zambery Yahya
Assistant coach	(Malaysia) Azli Mahmood
Goalkeeper coach	(Malaysia) Abdul Rahman Baba
Fitness coach	
Physiotherapist	(Malaysia) Abdul Salam Mohamad Noh
Team analyst	(Spain) Pol Corpas
Kitman	(Malaysia) Shahrul Ridzuan Shamsudin

== Players ==
=== First-team squad ===
As of 31 January 2023

Note: Flags indicate national team as defined under FIFA eligibility rules; some limited exceptions apply. Players may hold more than one non-FIFA nationality.

No.	Pos.	Nation	Player
1	GK	MAS	Farhan Abu Bakar
3	DF	MAS	Khairul Helmi Johari
4	DF	MAS	Ghaffar Rahman
5	DF	MAS	Yusri Yuhasmadi
6	MF	ESP	Mario Arqués (captain)
7	DF	MAS	Arip Amiruddin
9	FW	GAM	Nuha Marong
10	DF	ESP	Cifu
11	MF	KOR	Kang Yi-chan
13	GK	MAS	Nik Amin
14	DF	KOR	Kim Min-gyu
16	MF	MAS	Faiz Mazlan (on loan from Penang)
17	MF	MAS	Fazrul Amir
18	DF	MAS	Afiq Azuan
19	FW	MAS	Nurshamil Abd Ghani

No.	Pos.	Nation	Player
21	FW	MAS	Danial Ashraf
22	FW	MAS	Shafiq Shaharudin
23	DF	PHI	Carli de Murga
24	FW	NGA	Ismahil Akinade
27	GK	MAS	Rozaimi Rahamat
32	DF	PHI	Christian Rontini (vice-captain)
33	FW	MAS	Hafizan Ghazali
37	DF	MAS	Gerald Gadit (on loan from Sabah)
61	FW	MAS	Ammar Nuqman
66	MF	MAS	Ikhwan Yazek
72	MF	MAS	Syaqimi Rozi
77	MF	ARG	Leonardo Rolón
80	MF	MAS	Khairil Anuar
88	MF	MAS	Muhaimin Izuddin
91	MF	MAS	Afzal Akbar

=== Out on loan ===
Note: Flags indicate national team as defined under FIFA eligibility rules; some limited exceptions apply. Players may hold more than one non-FIFA nationality.

No. / Pos. / Nation / Player; — / MF / MAS / Mior Dani (at Kedah Darul Aman until 17 September 2023)	No. / Pos. / Nation / Player; — / MF / IDN / Natanael Siringoringo (at Dewa United until 31 March 2023)

== Transfers ==
=== First leg ===
In: Note: Flags indicate national team as defined under FIFA eligibility rules; some limited exceptions apply. Players may hold more than one non-FIFA nationality.

No.	Pos.	Nation	Player
—	FW	MAS	Farhan Roslan (loan return from Sabah)
—	MF	MAS	Mior Dani (loan return from Sri Pahang)
—	FW	IDN	Natanael Siringoringo (loan return from (Indonesia) Dewa United)
—	GK	MAS	Rozaimi Rahamat (from Johor Darul Ta'zim II)
—	DF	MAS	Gerald Gadit (on loan from Sabah)
—	DF	KOR	Kim Min-kyu (from (South Korea) Pohang Steelers)
—	FW	MAS	Shafiq Shaharudin (from Kuala Lumpur Rovers)
—	MF	MAS	Faiz Mazlan (on loan from Penang)
—	MF	KOR	Kang Eui-chan (from (South Korea) Gangwon)
—	FW	GAM	Nuha Marong (from (India) Rajasthan United)
—	MF	PHI	Andreas Esswein (from (Philippines) United City)
—	MF	ESP	Mario Arqués (from (Vietnam) Song Lam Nghe An)
—	GK	MAS	Farhan Abu Bakar (from Kuala Lumpur Rovers)
—	MF	MAS	Khairil Anuar (from Sarawak United)
—	FW	MAS	Leslee Jesunathan (from Petaling Jaya City)
—	FW	MAS	Afzal Akbar (from UiTM)
—	DF	MAS	Afiq Azuan (from Harini)
—	DF	PHI	Christian Rontini (from Penang)
—	DF	ESP	Cifu (from (Spain) Ibiza)
—	FW	NGA	Ismahil Akinade (from (Bangladesh) Sheikh Russel)
—	DF	PHI	Carli de Murga (from Johor Darul Ta'zim)
—	MF	ARG	Leonardo Rolón (from (Argentina) Mitre)

Out: Note: Flags indicate national team as defined under FIFA eligibility rules; some limited exceptions apply. Players may hold more than one non-FIFA nationality.

No.	Pos.	Nation	Player
—	DF	MAS	Latiff Suhaimi (loan return to Penang)
—	MF	MAS	Mior Dani (loan to Kedah Darul Aman)
—	FW	JPN	Kenta Hara
—	FW	BRA	Nixon Guylherme
—	MF	BRA	Felipe Hereda (to (Brazil) Democrata)
—	DF	MAS	Zubir Azmi
—	DF	MAS	Adam Nadzmi
—	MF	MAS	Adam Malique (to Sri Pahang)
—	GK	MAS	Asfa Abidin
—	GK	MAS	Amin Faisal
—	MF	MAS	Jasmir Mehat
—	FW	MAS	Farhan Roslan (to Sabah)
—	MF	MAS	Syed Sobri
—	MF	MAS	Dzulfahmi Hadi (to PDRM)
—	FW	MAS	Alifh Aiman (to PDRM)
—	GK	MAS	Solehin Mamat
—	MF	MAS	Shyamierul Razmee (to PDRM)
—	MF	MAS	Azrie Basalie
—	MF	MAS	Shahrul Igwan
—	DF	MAS	Danial Hadri
—	DF	MAS	Osman Yusoff
—	MF	MAS	Shafiq Al-Hafiz (to Penang)
—	MF	MAS	Mathias Mansor (to Sarawak United)

== Competitions ==
=== Pre-season and friendlies ===
Win Draw Loss Fixtures

15 January 2023 Friendly	Buriram United (Thailand)	7–0	(Malaysia) Kelantan	Songkhla
		Report		Stadium: Tinsulanon Stadium

20 January 2023 Friendly	Kedah Darul Aman (Malaysia)	0–2	(Malaysia) Kelantan	Alor Setar
				Stadium: Darul Aman Stadium

30 January 2023 Friendly	UiTM (Malaysia)	0–3	(Malaysia) Kelantan	Shah Alam
				Stadium: UiTM Stadium

19 February 2023 Friendly	Kelantan (Malaysia)	2–0	(Malaysia) PIB	Kota Bharu
				Stadium: Sultan Muhammad IV Stadium

=== Malaysia Super League ===
==== League table ====
Pos	Team	Pld	W	D	L	GF	GA	GD	Pts	Qualification or relegation
10	Penang	26	6	6	14	29	50	−21	24	
11	Perak	26	6	4	16	25	55	−30	22	
12	Kelantan United	26	4	5	17	29	65	−36	17	
13	Kuching City	26	2	6	18	24	51	−27	12	
14	Kelantan (Note: MFL officially snubs Kelantan club licensing approval.)	26	2	2	22	29	121	−92	8	Ejected from Malaysian Super League

Source: MFL
Rules for classification: 1) Points; 2) Goal difference; 3) Number of goals scored.

==== Results summary ====
Overall								Home						Away					
Pld	W	D	L	GF	GA	GD	Pts	W	D	L	GF	GA	GD	W	D	L	GF	GA	GD
8	1	1	6	9	25	−16	4	1	1	1	5	4	+1	0	0	5	4	21	−17

Last updated: 9 April 2023.
Source: Malaysia Super League

==== Results by round ====
Round	1	2	3	4	5	6	7	8	9
Ground	H	A	H	A	H	A	A	A	A
Result	L	L	W	L	D	L	L	L	
Position	10	14	7	9	10	11	13	13	

Updated to match(es) played on 9 April 2023. Source: Malaysian Football League
A = Away; H = Home; W = Win; D = Draw; L = Loss; P = Postponed

==== Matches ====
25 February 2023 1	Kelantan	1–2	Kuching City	Kota Bharu
17:30 MYT	Cifu 51'; Marong (yellow card) 45'; Gerald (yellow card) 90+5'	Report	Célio Santos (yellow card) 45'; Abdallah 58'; Kamara 71'; Adam (yellow card) 76'	Stadium: Sultan Muhammad IV Stadium; Attendance: 5,138; Referee: Ahmad Zuhaidi Dzulkifli

2 March 2023 2	Sri Pahang	4–1	Kelantan	Kuantan
21:00 MYT	Sherman 12'; Ingreso 38'; Agüero 43'; Brundo 45+1'; Azwan (yellow card) 73'	Report	Rontini (yellow card) 69'; Cifu 90+5'	Stadium: Darul Makmur Stadium; Attendance: 6,040; Referee: Razlan Joffri Ali

5 March 2023 3	Kelantan	2–0	Penang	Kota Bharu
21:00 MYT	Akinade 22'; Rontini (yellow card) 33' (yellow-red card) 66'; Fazrul 36'; Ghaffar (yellow card) 44'	Report	Gomes (yellow card) 32'; Saad (red card) 68'	Stadium: Sultan Muhammad IV Stadium; Attendance: 6,011; Referee: Zulkarnain Zakaria

11 March 2023 4	Johor Darul Ta'zim	5–1	Kelantan	Iskandar Puteri
17:30 MYT	Diogo 3'; Endrick 26'; Forestieri 35'; Muñiz 56'; Arif 82' (pen.)	Report	Arqués (yellow card) 29'; Rolón 69' (pen.)	Stadium: Sultan Ibrahim Stadium; Attendance: 24,404; Referee: Muhammad Khairulsyahmi Ahmad Khalidi

17 March 2023 5	Kelantan	2–2	Kuala Lumpur City	Kota Bharu
20:15 MYT (UTC+8)	Kenny 41' (o.g.); Fazrul 45+2'; Arqués (yellow card) 90+2'; Amin (yellow card) 90+3'; Arip (yellow card) 90+5'	Report	Tchétché 11'; Lambert 34'	Stadium: Sultan Muhammad IV Stadium; Attendance: 6,678; Referee: S. Logeswaran

1 April 2023 6	Negeri Sembilan	4–2	Kelantan	Paroi
22:00 MYT	Mahalli 16'; Goulon 38'; Safuwan (yellow card) 52'; Tommy (yellow card) 73'; Shahrel 76'; Casagrande 89'	Report	Akinade 36' (pen.), 54'	Stadium: Tuanku Abdul Rahman Stadium; Attendance: 1,885; Referee: Mohd Fusser Mad Sallih

4 April 2023 7	Terengganu	5–0	Kelantan	Kuala Nerus
22:00 MYT	Mintah 16'; Adisak 21'; Mamut 67' (pen.), 90+1'; Hakimi 90+3'	Report	Arip (yellow card) 47'	Stadium: Sultan Mizan Zainal Abidin Stadium; Attendance: 5,025; Referee: Abdul Rahman Wahab

9 April 2023 8	Selangor	3–0	Kelantan	Petaling Jaya
22:00 MYT	del Valle (yellow card) 6', (goal) 28'; Al-Arab (yellow card) 36'; Salifu 80', 90'; Ruventhiran (yellow card) 89'	Report	Gerald (yellow card) 22'	Stadium: Petaling Jaya Stadium; Attendance: 5,761; Referee: Muhammad Nazmi Nasaruddin

19 April 2023 9	Sabah	6–1	Kelantan	Kota Kinabalu
21:15 MYT		Report	Cifu 46'	Stadium: Likas Stadium

=== Malaysia FA Cup ===
14 April 2023 Round of 16	Manjung City	0-3	Kelantan	Manjung
22:00 MYT (UTC+08:00)	Faris Ariffin (yellow card) 38'; Wan Izzat Wan Zaidi (yellow card) 72'	Report	Mario Arqués 33'; Nuha Marong (yellow card) 37' (goal) 59', 90'; Afzal Akbar (yellow card) 42'; Arip Amiruddin (yellow card) 69'; Ghaffar Rahman (yellow card) 72'; Kang Yi-chan (yellow card) 81'	Stadium: Manjung City Stadium; Attendance: 557; Referee: Muhammad Shukor bin Zulkilfee

== Squad statistics ==
=== Appearances and goals ===
- Players listed with no appearances have been in the matchday squad but only as unused substitutes.

No.	Pos	Nat	Player	Total		League		FA Cup		Malaysia Cup	
No.	Pos	Nat	Player	Apps	Goals	Apps	Goals	Apps	Goals	Apps	Goals
Goalkeepers
1	GK	(Malaysia) MAS	Farhan Abu Bakar	1	0	1	0	0	0	0	0
13	GK	(Malaysia) MAS	Nik Mohd Amin	5	0	5	0	0	0	0	0
27	GK	(Malaysia) MAS	Rozaimi Rahamat	3	0	3	0	0	0	0	0
Defenders
3	DF	(Malaysia) MAS	Khairul Helmi Johari	1	0	1	0	0	0	0	0
4	DF	(Malaysia) MAS	Ghaffar Rahman	9	0	9	0	0	0	0	0
5	DF	(Malaysia) MAS	Yusri Yuhasmadi	7	0	4+3	0	0	0	0	0
7	DF	(Malaysia) MAS	Arip Amiruddin	7	0	3+4	0	0	0	0	0
10	DF	(Spain) ESP	Cifu	9	3	7+2	3	0	0	0	0
14	DF	(South Korea) KOR	Kim Min-gyu	3	0	2+1	0	0	0	0	0
18	DF	(Malaysia) MAS	Afiq Azuan	2	0	0+2	0	0	0	0	0
23	DF	(Philippines) PHI	Carli de Murga	6	0	6	0	0	0	0	0
32	DF	(Philippines) PHI	Christian Rontini	5	0	5	0	0	0	0	0
37	DF	(Malaysia) MAS	Gerald Gadit	2	0	2	0	0	0	0	0
72	DF	(Malaysia) MAS	Syaqimi Rozi	1	0	0+1	0	0	0	0	0
Midfielders
6	MF	(Spain) ESP	Mario Arqués	9	0	8+1	0	0	0	0	0
11	MF	(South Korea) KOR	Kang Eui-chan	2	0	2	0	0	0	0	0
16	MF	(Malaysia) MAS	Faiz Mazlan	8	0	8	0	0	0	0	0
17	MF	(Malaysia) MAS	Fazrul Amir	8	2	7+1	2	0	0	0	0
21	MF	(Malaysia) MAS	Danial Ashraf	4	0	0+4	0	0	0	0	0
33	MF	(Malaysia) MAS	Hafizan Ghazali	2	0	1+1	0	0	0	0	0
66	MF	(Malaysia) MAS	Ikhwan Yazek	5	0	2+3	0	0	0	0	0
77	MF	(Argentina) ARG	Leonardo Rolón	5	1	1+4	1	0	0	0	0
80	MF	(Malaysia) MAS	Khairil Anuar	2	0	1+1	0	0	0	0	0
88	MF	(Malaysia) MAS	Muhaimin Izuddin	7	0	1+6	0	0	0	0	0
91	MF	(Malaysia) MAS	Afzal Akbar	8	0	8	0	0	0	0	0
Forwards
9	FW	(The Gambia) GAM	Nuha Marong	4	0	3+1	0	0	0	0	0
19	FW	(Malaysia) MAS	Nurshamil Abd Ghani	4	0	2+2	0	0	0	0	0
22	FW	(Malaysia) MAS	Shafiq Shaharudin	1	0	1	0	0	0	0	0
24	FW	(Nigeria) NGA	Ismahil Akinade	6	3	6	3	0	0	0	0
Out on Loan
29	MF	(Malaysia) MAS	Mior Dani	0	0	0	0	0	0	0	0
Left the club during the Season

Last updated: 19 April 2023
Source: Competitions, Soccerway.com

== Under-23s ==
=== Current squad ===
The Under-23s squad consists of players who participate in MFL Cup.

Note: Flags indicate national team as defined under FIFA eligibility rules; some limited exceptions apply. Players may hold more than one non-FIFA nationality.

No.	Pos.	Nation	Player
1	GK	MAS	Johan Shahzidane Tendot
2	DF	MAS	Muhammad Faris Mazelih
3	DF	MAS	Rakesh Munusamy
4	FW	MAS	Reegan Abraham Saravanan
5	DF	MAS	Hafiq Almuhafiz Jasman
6	MF	MAS	Krishna Thasan
7	MF	MAS	Saranraj Kala Arasu
8	MF	MAS	Mohamad Khala'if
9	MF	MAS	Muhamad Raimi Musthpar
10	FW	MAS	Muhamad Harith Akif
11	MF	MAS	Haziman Che Ngah
12	FW	MAS	Hariharan Kartheyges
13	DF	MAS	Muhammad Amirul Hakim

No.	Pos.	Nation	Player
14	DF	MAS	Mohamad Khairul Amin
15	MF	MAS	Amir Akmal
16	MF	MAS	Ahmad Firdaus Roslan
17	MF	MAS	Wan Muhamad Zulfadhli Ahza
18	DF	MAS	Muhammad Izzat Emeer
19	FW	MAS	Muhammad Mirza Malik
20	MF	MAS	Wan Muhammad Irfan
21	MF	MAS	Muhammad Afif Jazimin (captain)
23	MF	MAS	Muhammad Rizaqmi
24	DF	MAS	Muhammad Firdaus Hasnoddin
25	GK	MAS	Muhammad Irfan Haikal
31	MF	MAS	Khairil Anuar

=== MFL Cup ===
3 March 2023 1	Kuala Lumpur City Extension	1—0	Kelantan B	Cheras
20:15 MYT (UTC+8)	Faizal Hafiq 76'	Report		Stadium: Kuala Lumpur Stadium; Attendance: 187; Referee: Muhammad Latiffi Mohd Zahrom

21 March 2023 2	Negeri Sembilan	0—0	Kelantan B	Paroi
16:45 MYT (UTC+8)		Report		Stadium: Tuanku Abdul Rahman Stadium; Attendance: 46; Referee: Muhammad Aqmalhakim Abdul Rahim

29 March 2023 3	Sri Pahang	3—0	Kelantan B	Kuantan
22:00 MYT (UTC+8)		Report		Stadium: Darul Makmur Stadium; Attendance: 178; Referee: Mohd Izwan Abdullah

3 April 2023 4	Kuching City	2—3	Kelantan B	Kuching
21:15 MYT (UTC+8)		Report	Harith Akif 7' (27), 66'	Stadium: Sarawak State Stadium; Attendance: 80; Referee: Mohd Sarif Tahir

=== Appearances and goals ===
As of 3 April 2023

No.	Player	Position	Appearances	Goals
Kelantan Under-23s
1	(Malaysia) Johan Shahzidane Tendot	GK	3	0
2	(Malaysia) Muhammad Faris Mazelih	DF	2	0
3	(Malaysia) Rakesh Munusamy	DF	3	0
4	(Malaysia) Reegan Abraham	MF	2	0
6	(Malaysia) Krishna Thasan	MF	3	0
7	(Malaysia) Saranraj Kala Arasu	MF	3	0
8	(Malaysia) Mohamad Khala'if	MF	3	0
9	(Malaysia) Muhamad Raimi Musthpar	MF	1	0
10	(Malaysia) Muhamad Harith Akif	FW	4	3
11	(Malaysia) Haziman Che Ngah	MF	2	0
13	(Malaysia) Muhammad Amirul Hakim Lailee	DF	1	0
14	(Malaysia) Mohamad Khairul Amin	DF	3	0
15	(Malaysia) Amir Akmal	MF	2	0
16	(Malaysia) Ahmad Firdaus Roslan	MF	3	0
18	(Malaysia) Muhammad Izzat Emeer	DF	4	0
19	(Malaysia) Muhammad Mirza Malik	FW	2	0
20	(Malaysia) Irfan Nizar	MF	3	0
21	(Malaysia) Muhammad Afif Jazimin	MF	3	0
23	(Malaysia) Muhammad Rizaqmi	MF	1	0
24	(Malaysia) Muhammad Firdaus Hasnoddin	DF	4	0
25	(Malaysia) Muhammad Irfan Haikal	GK	1	0
31	(Malaysia) Khairil Anuar	MF	2	0
32	(Malaysia) Hafizan Ghazali	MF	2	0
33	(The Gambia) Nuha Marong	FW	1	0
34	(Malaysia) Gerald Gadit	MF	1	0
35	(Malaysia) Shafiq Shaharudin	FW	1	0
36	(South Korea) Kang Eui-chan	MF	1	0
Own goals				0
Total goals				3
