= Fazrul Amir =

Malaysian professional footballer

Personal information
- Full name: Mohamad Fazrul Amir bin Md Zaman
- Date of birth: 27 February 2000 (age 26)
- Place of birth: Kelantan, Malaysia
- Height: 1.63 m (5 ft 4 in)
- Position: Winger

Team information
- Current team: Kuala Lumpur City
- Number: 17

Youth career
- 2019: PKNS U19

Senior career*
Years	Team	Apps	(Gls)
2020–2021	Kelantan United	18	(0)
2022–2023	Kelantan	33	(3)
2024–2025	Kelantan Darul Naim	22	(2)
2025–	Kuala Lumpur City	1	(0)

International career^{‡}
2024–	Malaysia	5	(0)
- * Club domestic league appearances and goals as of 10 August 2025 ‡ National team caps and goals as of 21 December 2024

Mohamad Fazrul Amir bin Md Zaman (born 27 February 2000) is a Malaysian professional footballer who plays as a winger for Malaysia Super League club Kuala Lumpur City and the Malaysia national team.

== Club career ==
=== Youth ===
As a youth player, Fazrul joined the youth academy of PKNS.

=== Kelantan United ===
Fazrul started his career with Kelantan United. He renewed his contract before the 2021 season.

=== Kelantan ===
Before the 2022 season, Fazrul signed for Kelantan. During his first season, he was compared to Malaysia international Mohd Badhri Mohd Radzi. He also received praise from manager Rezal Zambery Yahya. On 5 March 2023, Fazrul scored his first goal for the club in a 2–0 win over Penang.

=== Kelantan Darul Naim ===
In 2024, Fazrul returned to Kelantan Darul Naim (Previously known as Kelantan United)

== International career ==
Fazrul was called up to the Malaysia national team for the first time in November 2024 ahead of the international friendlies against Laos and India. He made his international debut on 14 November 2024 against Laos. In November 2024, he was called up to the Malaysia squad for the 2024 ASEAN Championship.

== Style of play ==
Mainly operating as a winger, he is known for his agility.

== Career statistics ==
=== Club ===
As of match played 5 March 2025

Appearances and goals by club, season and competition
Club	Season	League			Cup		League Cup		Continental		Total	
Club	Season	Division	Apps	Goals	Apps	Goals	Apps	Goals	Apps	Goals	Apps	Goals
Kelantan United	2020	Malaysia Premier League	7	0	–		–		–		7	0
Kelantan United	2021	Malaysia Premier League	11	0	–		2	0	–		13	0
Kelantan United	Total		18	0	–		2	0	–		20	0
Kelantan	2022	Malaysia Premier League	12	0	1	0	3	0	–		16	0
Kelantan	2023	Malaysia Super League	21	3	1	0	0	0	–		22	3
Kelantan	Total		33	3	1	0	3	0	–		37	3
Kelantan Darul Naim	2024–25	Malaysia Super League	21	2	1	0	2	0	–		24	2
Kelantan Darul Naim	Total		21	2	1	0	2	0	–		24	2
Kuala Lumpur City	2025–26	Malaysia Super League	0	0	0	0	0	0	–		0	0
Kuala Lumpur City	Total		0	0	0	0	0	0	–		0	0
Career Total			0	0	0	0	0	0	–	–	0	0

=== International ===
As of match played 20 December 2024

Appearances and goals by national team and year
National team	Year	Apps	Goals
Malaysia	2024	5	0
Total		5	0
