= Nurshamil Abd Ghani =

Malaysian footballer

Nurshamil
Personal information
- Full name: Nurshamil bin Abd Ghani
- Date of birth: 25 September 1994 (age 32)
- Place of birth: Malacca, Malaysia
- Height: 1.78 m (5 ft 10 in)
- Position: Forward

Team information
- Current team: KL Rangers
- Number: 19

Youth career
- 2012–2013: PKNS

Senior career*
Years	Team	Apps	(Gls)
2013	PKNS	11	(0)
2014	Harimau Muda B	20	(4)
2015–2019	Melaka United	42	(20)
2017	→ Selangor (loan)	7	(0)
2019	→ Selangor United (loan)	6	(2)
2020	Penang		
2021–2022	Kelantan	33	(18)
2023–2024	Kuching City		
2024	PT Athletic		
2025	KL Rangers		
- * Club domestic league appearances and goals

Nurshamil bin Abd Ghani (born 25 September 1994) is a Malaysian professional footballer who plays as a forward.

Nurshamil is also Melaka United's topscorer in the 2015 Malaysia FAM League. He also well known with his new ability to being super-sub as he has managed to score last minute goal as substitute player in two early 2016 Malaysia Premier League matches against Sime Darby and PKNS.

== Club career ==
=== Selangor ===
On 17 February 2017, Nurshamil made his debut coming from the bench at the 83rd minute of the match. Selangor won that match by 3–1.

=== Penang ===
In 2020, he joined Penang for one-year deal.

=== Kelantan ===
In 2021, Nurshamil signed for Malaysia Premier League side Kelantan. Nurshamil managed to score 9 goals in the league and became local topscorer in Malaysia Premier League. During 2022 season, Nurshamil have managed to score 5 league goals in only 9 league games for Kelantan makes him one of lethal striker in Malaysia Premier League.

== Personal life ==
Nurshamil was born in Malacca. He is of Malay descent and was brought up as a Islam; Nurshamil attended Paya Rumput Primary School, Dato' Dol Said Secondary School and Malacca High School.

== Career statistics ==
=== Club ===
As of match played on 12 September 2021

Appearances and goals by club, season and competition
Club	Season	League			Cup		League Cup		Total	
Club	Season	Division	Apps	Goals	Apps	Goals	Apps	Goals	Apps	Goals
Harimau Muda B	2014	S.League	20	4	0	0	0	0	20	4
Harimau Muda B	Total		20	4	0	0	0	0	20	4
Melaka United	2015	Malaysia FAM League	27	17	1	1	0	0	28	18
Melaka United	2016	Malaysia Premier League	9	3	1	0	0	0	10	3
Melaka United	2018	Malaysia Super League	5	0	1	1	0	0	6	1
Melaka United	2019	Malaysia Super League	1	0	1	0	0	0	2	0
Melaka United	Total		42	20	3	2	0	0	45	22
Selangor (loan)	2017	Malaysia Super League	7	0	0	0	2	0	9	0
Selangor (loan)	Total		7	0	0	0	2	0	9	0
Selangor United (loan)	2019	Malaysia Premier League	6	2	0	0	6	3	12	5
Selangor United (loan)	Total		6	2	0	0	6	3	12	5
Penang	2020	Malaysia Premier League	0	0	0	0	1	0	1	0
Penang	Total		0	0	0	0	1	0	1	0
Kelantan	2021	Malaysia Premier League	18	9	0	0	0	0	18	9
Kelantan	2022	Malaysia Premier League	15	9	0	0	2	1	17	10
Kelantan	2023	Malaysia Super League	0	0	0	0	0	0	0	0
Kelantan	Total		33	18	0	0	2	1	35	19
Career total			97	40	2	1	9	3	100	38

== Honours ==
=== Club ===
Melaka United

- Malaysia FAM League: 2015
- Malaysia Premier League: 2016

Penang

- Malaysia Premier League: 2020
