= Kedah Darul Aman FC–Kedah FA state football team schism =

The "schism" between Kedah Darul Aman and Kedah FA state football team is a direct consequence of the Football Association of Malaysia (FAM) initiative to privatize all clubs, resulting in the existence of two distinct entities representing the state of Kedah. KDA FC is the professional club that inherited the original history, while Kedah FA was revived by the state's football association, Kedah Football Association (KFA).

== History ==
The original Kedah Football Association (KFA) team, established in 1924, turned professional in 1994 and was eventually privatized in 2021, forming the entity known as Kedah Darul Aman FC (KDA FC). This was done to meet the national body's club licensing requirements, with KFA relinquishing all ownership. KDA FC is managed by Darulaman Football Club Sdn. Bhd. under the majority ownership of Tan Sri Dr. Mohd Daud Bakar. However, the KFA decided to revive a separate Kedah FA team in 2025, to compete in the Malaysia A1 Semi-Pro League. This team is distinct from KDA FC and does not inherit the original history or honours.

== Rivalry ==
The simultaneous existence of two teams from the same state has caused division among supporters. The situation has also led to public disagreements between the managements of both entities, with KFA chairman Ibrahim Ismail clarifying that his association is not responsible for KDA FC's financial issues, such as salary arrears. A notable match occurred on October 11, 2025, when Kedah FA defeated KDA FC by 1–0 at the Darul Aman Stadium.

Comparison
Aspect	KDA FC	Kedah FA
Governing body	Darulaman Football Club Sdn. Bhd.	Kedah Football Association (KFA)
History	Inherited the history and honors of the original Kedah state team	A new, separate entity; does not inherit previous history
Funding	Private funding and sponsorship	State government, KFA
