= 2025–26 Kuala Lumpur City F.C. season =

Kuala Lumpur City
2025–26 season
- President: Syed Yazid Syed Omar
- CEO: Stanley Bernard
- Head coach: Risto Vidaković
- Stadium: Kuala Lumpur Stadium
- Malaysia Super League: 4th
- Malaysia FA Cup: Round of 16
- Malaysia Cup: Semi-finals
- Top goalscorer: League: Safawi Rasid (5); All: Safawi Rasid (5)
Home colours	Away colours

The 2025–26 season is Kuala Lumpur City F.C.'s 47th season in club history and 5th season in the Malaysia Super League after rebranding their name from Kuala Lumpur United and promotion in 2021.

In addition to the domestic league, the club will be participated in the Malaysia FA Cup and the Malaysia Cup.

On 1 July 2025, Risto Vidaković joined the club as the new head coach.

== Coaching staff ==
Position	Staff
Head coach	(Serbia) Risto Vidaković
Assistant head coach	(Bosnia and Herzegovina) Edin Prljača
Assistant coach	(Montenegro) Srđan Lopičić
Assistant coach	(Malaysia) Wan Mustafa Wan Ismail
Fitness coach	(Malaysia) Mashiedee Sulaiman
U20s head coach	(Malaysia) Iqbal Hanafi
U20s assistant head coach	(Malaysia) Rashmizan Rasid
U20s goalkeeper coach	(Malaysia) Ashazar Yahya

== Players ==
=== First-team squad ===
Note: Flags indicate national team as defined under FIFA eligibility rules; some limited exceptions apply. Players may hold more than one non-FIFA nationality.

No.	Pos.	Nation	Player
1	GK	PHI	Quincy Kammeraad
3	DF	MAS	Adam Nor Azlin
4	DF	MAS	Kamal Azizi
5	MF	ESP	Madger Gomes
6	DF	MAS	Ryan Lambert (on loan from Johor Darul Ta'zim)
7	MF	ARG	Enzo Cora
8	MF	MAS	Zhafri Yahya (third-captain)
9	DF	AUS	Giancarlo Gallifuoco (vice-captain)
10	FW	LBR	Kpah Sherman
11	FW	MAS	Safawi Rasid (on loan from Johor Darul Ta'zim)
12	DF	MAS	Declan Lambert (on loan from Johor Darul Ta'zim)
14	MF	MAS	Syamer Kutty Abba (on loan from Johor Darul Ta'zim)
16	DF	MAS	Partiban Janasekaran

No.	Pos.	Nation	Player
17	FW	MAS	Fazrul Amir
20	DF	MAS	Azrif Nasrulhaq
21	MF	MAS	Kenny Pallraj
22	GK	MAS	Hafizul Hakim
23	DF	MAS	Syazwan Andik
24	MF	ESP	Gorka Larrucea
28	MF	MAS	Paulo Josué (captain)
30	GK	MAS	Asyraaf Omar
34	MF	MAS	Amirul Aiman
37	FW	MAS	Haqimi Azim
48	MF	ITA	Nicolao Dumitru
77	MF	ESP	Víctor Ruiz
96	DF	UKR	Dmytro Lytvyn

=== U20s squad ===
Note: Flags indicate national team as defined under FIFA eligibility rules; some limited exceptions apply. Players may hold more than one non-FIFA nationality.

No.	Pos.	Nation	Player
1	GK	MAS	Hafiz Zakiar
4	DF	MAS	Syafiq Haiqal
5	DF	MAS	Reezaril Zulfayree
6	MF	MAS	Aliff Imran
7	MF	MAS	Abdul Rauf Iqbal
8	MF	MAS	Megat Aniq Muqri
9	MF	MAS	Fakhrul Ezwan
10	MF	MAS	Faizal Affan
11	MF	MAS	Izzat Irfan (captain)
12	MF	MAS	Danish Asraf
13	DF	MAS	Aiman Najwan
14	DF	MAS	Qawiem Joehary
15	DF	MAS	Zhafran Mokhtar
16	MF	MAS	Nazhan Nor Suhaimi

No.	Pos.	Nation	Player
17	MF	MAS	Afiq Amani
18	GK	MAS	Hasbul Hadi Hanis
19	MF	MAS	Nabil Zakwan
20	MF	MAS	Ammar Irham
21	GK	MAS	Daris Irfan
22	DF	MAS	Muzaffar Shah
23	DF	MAS	Shafiy Eddin
24	FW	MAS	Nabil Sharul Naim
26	DF	MAS	Adam Danial
30	MF	MAS	Razmirul Irfanshah
80	GK	MAS	Nurdanish Hazeeq
81	DF	MAS	Denish Rahman
88	MF	MAS	Alif Hakimi

== Transfers ==
=== In ===
No.	Pos.	Player	Transferred from	Date	Source
	FW	(Malaysia) Safawi Rasid	Johor Darul Ta'zim	2 July 2025	
	FW	(Argentina) Manuel Hidalgo	Johor Darul Ta'zim	2 July 2025	
	MF	(Malaysia) Syamer Kutty Abba	Johor Darul Ta'zim	3 July 2025	
	GK	(Philippines) Quincy Kammeraad	(Philippines) One Taguig	4 July 2025	
	DF	(Malaysia) Adam Nor Azlin	Sri Pahang	7 July 2025	
	DF	(Malaysia) Syazwan Andik	Sri Pahang	8 July 2025	
	DF	(Ukraine) Dmytro Lytvyn	(Azerbaijan) Sabail	8 July 2025	
	MF	(Spain) Gorka Larrucea	(Azerbaijan) Sabail	8 July 2025	
	MF	(Malaysia) Fazrul Amir	Kelantan Darul Naim	8 July 2025	
	FW	(Liberia) Kpah Sherman	Sri Pahang	8 July 2025	
	FW	(Italy) Nicolao Dumitru	(Indonesia) PSS Sleman	8 July 2025	
	DF	(Malaysia) Azrif Nasrulhaq	Sri Pahang	8 July 2025	
	MF	(Argentina) Enzo Cora		8 July 2025	
	GK	(Malaysia) Asyraaf Omar	Kuala Lumpur Rovers	8 July 2025	
	MF	(Spain) Víctor Ruiz	Unattached	8 July 2025	
	MF	(Spain) Madger Gomes	Unattached	31 August 2025	

=== Out ===
No.	Pos.	Player	Transferred to	Date	Source
1	GK	(New Zealand) Lawton Green	Unattached	29 June 2025	
5	DF	(Montenegro) Adrijan Rudović	Unattached	29 June 2025	
17	MF	(Malaysia) Sean Giannelli	UM-Damansara United	29 June 2025	
18	MF	(Malaysia) Mahalli Jasuli	Unattached	29 June 2025	
20	MF	(Malaysia) Amirul Aiman	Unattached	29 June 2025	
23	DF	(Malaysia) Nicholas Swirad	Unattached	29 June 2025	
29	MF	(Malaysia) Arif Shaqirin	Unattached	29 June 2025	
33	DF	(Malaysia) Juzaerul Jasmi	Immigration II	29 June 2025	
34	DF	(Malaysia) Khairul Naim	Immigration II	29 June 2025	
42	FW	(Malaysia) Suhaimi Abu	Unattached	29 June 2025	
66	DF	(Malaysia) Nabil Hakim	Unattached	29 June 2025	
70	MF	(Malaysia) Hadi Mizei	Unattached	29 June 2025	
77	MF	(Malaysia) Sharvin Selvakumaran	Unattached	29 June 2025	
30	GK	(Malaysia) Azri Ghani	Negeri Sembilan	15 June 2025	
25	DF	(Malaysia) Anwar Ibrahim	Negeri Sembilan	4 July 2025	
7	MF	(Bosnia and Herzegovina) Jovan Motika	Negeri Sembilan	4 July 2025	
88	MF	(Malaysia) Brendan Gan	(Australia) Sutherland Sharks	8 July 2025	

== Competitions ==
=== Overview ===
Competition	First match	Last match	Starting round	Final position	Record							
Competition	First match	Last match	Starting round	Final position	Pld	W	D	L	GF	GA	GD	Win %
Malaysia Super League	9 August 2025	17 May 2026	Matchday 1	4th	24	12	7	5	40	29	+11	50.00
Malaysia FA Cup	18 August 2025	14 September 2025	Round of 16	Round of 16	2	1	0	1	2	3	−1	50.00
Malaysia Cup	18 January 2026	7 April 2026	Round of 16	Semi-finals	6	2	1	3	7	12	−5	33.33
Total					32	15	8	9	49	44	+5	46.88

Source: Competitions

=== Malaysia Super League ===
9 August 2025 1	Immigration	0–3	Kuala Lumpur City	George Town
21:00		Report	Rizal 30' (o.g.); Safawi 56'; Hidalgo 83' (pen.)	Stadium: City Stadium; Attendance: 444; Referee: Muhammad Shukor Zulkiflee

13 August 2025 2	Kuala Lumpur City	1–1	Sabah	Cheras
21:00	Lambert 69'	Report	Peres 90+2'	Stadium: Kuala Lumpur Stadium; Attendance: 1,838; Referee: Mohammad Zamzaidi Katimin

24 August 2025 3	Penang	1–2	Kuala Lumpur City	George Town
20:15	Brundo 48'	Report	Safawi 34'; Kamal 77'	Stadium: City Stadium; Attendance: 2,498; Referee: Mohd Hasrol Mohd Amir

27 August 2025 4	Kuala Lumpur City	3–1	PDRM	Cheras
20:15	Safawi 25'; Josué 53'; Dumitru 77' (pen.)	Report	Kyaw 90'	Stadium: Kuala Lumpur Stadium; Attendance: 616; Referee: Mohd Fusser Mad Sallih

22 September 2025 5	DPMM (Brunei)	0–4	Kuala Lumpur City	Bandar Seri Begawan
20:15		Report	Yura 25' (o.g.); Ruiz 56'; Safawi 64', 84'	Stadium: Hassanal Bolkiah National Stadium; Attendance: 3,200; Referee: Muhammad Izzul Fikri Kamaruzaman

27 September 2025 6	Kuala Lumpur City	1–0	Terengganu	Cheras
17:00	Josué 83' (pen.)	Report		Stadium: Kuala Lumpur Stadium; Attendance: 1,551; Referee: Tuan Mohd Yaasin Tuan Mohd Hanafiah

Pos	Team	Pld	W	D	L	GF	GA	GD	Pts	Qualification or relegation
2	Kuching City	24	16	5	3	45	14	+31	53	Qualification for the AFC Champions League Two group stage & ASEAN Club Championship group stage (Note: Since the winners of the 2025 Malaysia FA Cup, Johor Darul Ta'zim, had already qualified for the Champions League Elite via league position, the Champions League Two spot was passed to the second-placed team.)
3	Selangor	24	16	4	4	59	20	+39	52	
4	Kuala Lumpur City	24	12	7	5	40	29	+11	43	
5	Terengganu	24	10	6	8	39	34	+5	36	
6	Immigration	24	9	5	10	38	43	−5	32	

Updated to match(es) played on 17 May 2026. Source: Malaysian Football League
Rules for classification: 1) Points; 2) Goal difference; 3) Number of goals scored.

=== Malaysia FA Cup ===
Round of 16

18 August 2025 First leg	Kelantan TRW	3–1	Kuala Lumpur City	Kota Bharu
21:00 MYT (UTC+8)	Olusegun 5', 17'; Selvaraj 64'	Report	Syamer 87'	Stadium: Sultan Muhammad IV Stadium; Attendance: 1,420; Referee: Mohamad Faizudin Ismail

14 September 2025 Second leg	Kuala Lumpur City	1–0 (2–3 agg.)	Kelantan TRW	Cheras
20:15 MYT (UTC+8)	Ruiz 71'	Report		Stadium: Kuala Lumpur Stadium; Attendance: 1,871; Referee: Muhammad Khairulsyahmi Ahmad Khalidi

== Statistics ==
=== Appearances and goals ===
No.	Pos	Nat	Player	Total		Malaysia Super League		Malaysia FA Cup		Malaysia Cup	
No.	Pos	Nat	Player	Apps	Goals	Apps	Goals	Apps	Goals	Apps	Goals
Goalkeepers
1	GK	(Philippines) PHI	Quincy Kammeraad	8	0	6	0	2	0	0	0
Defenders
3	DF	(Malaysia) MAS	Adam Nor Azlin	2	0	1+1	0	0	0	0	0
4	DF	(Malaysia) MAS	Kamal Azizi	8	1	6	1	2	0	0	0
9	DF	(Australia) AUS	Giancarlo Gallifuoco	5	0	3+1	0	1	0	0	0
12	DF	(Malaysia) MAS	Declan Lambert	8	1	5+1	1	2	0	0	0
23	DF	(Malaysia) MAS	Syazwan Andik	1	1	1	1	0	0	0	0
96	DF	(Ukraine) UKR	Dmytro Lytvyn	8	0	6	0	2	0	0	0
Midfielders
5	MF	(Spain) ESP	Madger Gomes	2	0	0+1	0	0+1	0	0	0
6	MF	(Malaysia) MAS	Ryan Lambert	8	0	5+1	0	1+1	0	0	0
7	MF	(Argentina) ARG	Enzo Cora	4	0	0+3	0	0+1	0	0	0
8	MF	(Malaysia) MAS	Zhafri Yahya	6	0	1+4	0	1	0	0	0
14	MF	(Malaysia) MAS	Syamer Kutty Abba	6	1	2+2	0	1+1	1	0	0
17	MF	(Malaysia) MAS	Fazrul Amir	5	0	2+2	0	1	0	0	0
21	MF	(Malaysia) MAS	Kenny Pallraj	6	0	2+2	0	2	0	0	0
24	MF	(Spain) ESP	Gorka Larrucea	4	0	4	0	0	0	0	0
77	MF	(Spain) ESP	Víctor Ruiz	5	2	2+2	1	1	1	0	0
Forwards
10	FW	(Liberia) LBR	Kpah Sherman	8	0	5+1	0	1+1	0	0	0
11	FW	(Malaysia) MAS	Safawi Rasid	8	5	6	5	2	0	0	0
28	FW	(Malaysia) MAS	Paulo Josué	6	2	3+2	2	1	0	0	0
37	FW	(Malaysia) MAS	Haqimi Azim	3	0	0+2	0	0+1	0	0	0
48	FW	(Italy) ITA	Nicolao Dumitru	8	1	4+2	1	2	0	0	0
Players transferred/loaned out during the season
88	FW	(Argentina) ARG	Manuel Hidalgo	2	1	2	1	0	0	0	0

Last updated: 27 September 2025
Source: Competitions
