= Natanael Siringoringo =

Indonesian footballer (born 1999)

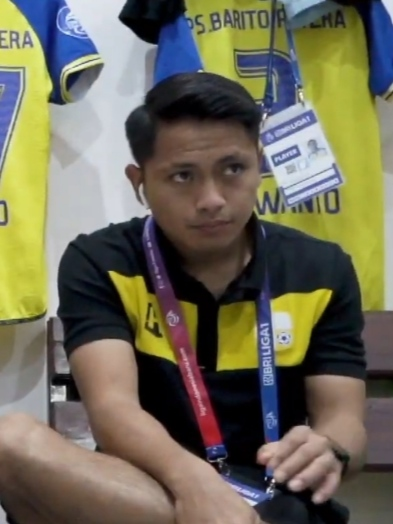
- Siringoringo with Barito Putera in 2023

Personal information
- Full name: Natanael Siringoringo
- Date of birth: 18 September 1999 (age 27)
- Place of birth: Medan, Indonesia
- Height: 1.65 m (5 ft 5 in)
- Positions: Winger; attacking midfielder

Team information
- Current team: PSPS Pekanbaru
- Number: 99

Senior career*
Years	Team	Apps	(Gls)
2018	SDR FC Binjai (futsal)		
2019–2020	PSMS Medan	14	(2)
2020–2021	Sulut United	0	(0)
2021–2023	Kelantan	28	(7)
2022–2023	→ Dewa United (loan)	27	(2)
2023–2026	Barito Putera	33	(1)
2026	→ PSPS Pekanbaru (loan)	9	(2)
2026–	PSPS Pekanbaru	6	(2)

International career
2021	Indonesia U23	1	(0)
- * Club domestic league appearances and goals as of 18 October 2026

Natanael Siringoringo (born 18 September 1999) is an Indonesian professional footballer who plays as a winger or attacking midfielder for Championship club PSPS Pekanbaru.

Having played futsal prior to his footballing career, Siringoringo began his career by joining local club PSMS Medan in 2019. A year later he went to sign for Sulut United. In 2021, Siringoringo went abroad to Malaysia, joining Kelantan in the Malaysia Premier League. In 2022, He returned to Indonesia by joining Dewa United on a loan deal, where he would mark his top flight debut in the same year.

== Club career ==
=== Early career ===
Siringoringo started his career by playing futsal. with SDR FC Binjai, he has competed in the 2018 Indonesia Pro Futsal League.

=== PSMS Medan ===
In 2019, Siringoringo signed his first professional contract for Indonesian Liga 2 club, PSMS Medan. At the age of 19, Siringoringo made his professional debut on 6 July 2019, during a 3–2 league victory over Perserang Serang. On 1 August 2019, Siringoringo scored his first professional goal in the Derby Sumatera against Sriwijaya. He scored the goal in the 25th minute from a header, upon receiving a cross from Rendi Saputra. the final match score was 1–1.

=== Sulut United ===
In 2020, Siringoringo signed for Sulut United. due to the COVID-19 pandemic the 2020 Liga 2 season was cancelled. Siringoringo would leave the club in 2021, without making a single appearance.

=== Kelantan ===
On 12 February 2021, it was confirmed that Siringoringo had signed for Malaysia Premier League club Kelantan. It was revealed that he has signed a three-year contract. On 9 March, Siringoringo made his debut, by coming on as a substitute during a 2–1 league win against FAM-MSN Project. He also assisted the second goal. Four-days later, on 13 March, Siringoringo made his first start and assisted against PDRM as his team won 2–1. Siringoringo scored his first goal for The Red Warriors on 10 April, during a league match against Kuching City.

On 27 September, Siringoringo started against Malaysia Super League giants Johor Darul Ta'zim in the Malaysia Cup. The match result was a defeat with a score of 2–0. On 11 August, Siringoringo scored two-goals in Derby Kelantan against Kelantan United, helping his team win 3–1. On 30 September he scored a goal in a 2–2 draw against Sabah in the Malaysia Cup. On 5 March, Siringoringo netted his first goal of the season during a 2–1 victory against Johor Darul Ta'zim II in the league match opener.

==== Loan to Dewa United ====
On 9 June 2022, Kelantan announced a loan move of Siringoringo to Indonesian club Dewa United. It was reported both parties has agreed to pay transfer loan fee by Dewa United. Siringoringo was loaned for the first half of the 2022–23 Liga 1 season. He finally made his debut on 24 June, in the 2022 Indonesia President's Cup against Persis Solo as his team drew 1–1. On 25 July, Siringoringo made his league debut and scored the winning goal in a 3–2 victory against Persis. On 14 January 2022, Siringoringo scored in 84th minute and saved Dewa United from losing to Persis Solo, score draw 1–1.

=== Barito Putera ===
On 6 November 2023, Siringoringo signed for Barito Putera for an undisclosed fee. On 6 February 2024, Siringoringo scored his first goal for Barito Putera against his former club Dewa United in a 2–2 draw.

== International career ==
Siringoringo made his debut for Indonesia U23, on 22 October 2021, by starting in a 2–0 win against Nepal U23.

== Career statistics ==
=== Club ===
As of match played 18 October 2026

Appearances and goals by club, season and competition
Club	Season	League			National cup (Note: Includes Malaysia FA Cup)		League cup (Note: Includes Malaysia Cup)		Continental		Other		Total	
Club	Season	Division	Apps	Goals	Apps	Goals	Apps	Goals	Apps	Goals	Apps	Goals	Apps	Goals
PSMS Medan	2019	Liga 2	14	2	–		–		–		0	0	14	2
Sulut United	2020	Liga 2	0	0	–		–		–		0	0	0	0
Kelantan	2021	Malaysia Premier League	17	3	–		2	1	–		0	0	19	4
Kelantan	2022	Malaysia Premier League	7	1	1	0	0	0	–		0	0	8	1
Kelantan	2023	Malaysia Super League	7	3	0	0	2	0	–		1 (Note: Appearances in MFL Challenge Cup)	0	10	3
Kelantan	Total		31	7	1	0	4	1	0	0	1	0	37	8
Dewa United (loan)	2022–23	Liga 1	27	2	–		–		–		2 (Note: Appearances in Indonesia President's Cup)	0	29	2
Barito Putera	2023–24	Liga 1	8	1	–		–		–		0	0	8	1
Barito Putera	2024–25	Liga 1	19	0	–		–		–		0	0	19	0
Barito Putera	2025–26	Championship	5	0	–		–		–		0	0	5	0
PSPS Pekanbaru (loan)	2025–26	Championship	9	2	–		–		–		0	0	9	2
PSPS Pekanbaru	2026–27	Championship	6	2	–		–		–		0	0	6	2
Career total			119	16	1	0	4	1	0	0	3	0	127	17
