= Ryan Lambert =

Malaysian professional footballer

Personal information
- Full name: Ryan Edward Kit Seng Lee Lambert
- Date of birth: 21 September 1998 (age 28)
- Place of birth: Kuala Lumpur, Malaysia
- Height: 1.78 m (5 ft 10 in)
- Position: Midfielder

Team information
- Current team: Kuala Lumpur City (on loan from Johor Darul Ta'zim)
- Number: 6

Youth career
- FC Clifton Hill
- Richmond SC

Senior career*
| Years | Team | Apps | (Gls) |
| 2014–2015 | Richmond | 14 | (0) |
| 2016 | Melbourne Victory NPL | 9 | (0) |
| 2017 | Richmond | 11 | (0) |
| 2018 | Achilles '29 | 14 | (0) |
| 2018–2021 | FC Den Bosch II | 22 | (0) |
| 2018–2021 | FC Den Bosch | 8 | (0) |
| 2021–2023 | Kuala Lumpur City | 45 | (4) |
| 2024– | Johor Darul Ta'zim | 0 | (0) |
| 2024– | → Kuala Lumpur City (loan) | 27 | (1) |

International career^{‡}
| 2026– | Malaysia | 2 | (0) |
- * Club domestic league appearances and goals as of 27 September 2025 ‡ National team caps and goals as of 17 November 2026

Ryan Edward Kit Seng Lee Lambert (born 21 September 1998) is a Malaysian professional footballer who plays as a midfielder for Malaysia Super League club Kuala Lumpur City, on loan from Johor Darul Ta'zim and the Malaysia national team.

Lambert was born in Kuala Lumpur, but then moved to Thailand and Australia at a young age. He played youth football with Richmond before starting his senior career with the side. After spending some time with Melbourne Victory's youth team, Lambert moved to the Netherlands in 2017, where he played for Achilles '29 and FC Den Bosch.

== Early life ==
Lambert was born in Kuala Lumpur to an English father and Malaysian Chinese mother. The family then moved to Thailand, where they stayed for six months before relocating again to Melbourne, Australia.

Lambert has a twin brother, Declan, who is also a professional footballer. The two played together at Clifton Hill, Richmond, Achilles '29 and FC Den Bosch.

== Club career ==
After playing youth football for FC Clifton Hill and Richmond, Lambert made his senior debut for Richmond aged just 15. In 2016, he played for one season for Melbourne Victory's youth team before departing after he suffered a major injury.

In 2018, the Lambert twins moved to Europe, and trialed with sides including Sparta Rotterdam and FC Dordrecht. The pair eventually signed for Dutch Tweede Divisie side Achilles '29. However, they left the club after it suffered relegation at the end of the 2017–18 Tweede Divisie.

The twins then moved to Eerste Divisie side FC Den Bosch in 2018. Their first-team opportunities were initially limited by the arrival of several other foreign players shortly after their signing. However, Lambert made his debut as a substitute in Den Bosch's opening game of the 2019–20 Eerste Divisie and by the 2020–21 Eerste Divisie season, both brothers featured regularly for the side. On 5 October 2020, Lambert tested positive for COVID-19. In March 2021, he was told that his contract with the club would not be extended.

On 28 April 2021, it was announced that Lambert had signed with Kuala Lumpur City. He was part of the team that won the 2021 Malaysia Cup.

== Career statistics ==
=== Club ===
As of match played 29 August

Appearances and goals by club, season and competition
| Club | Season | League | | | Cup (Note: Malaysia FA Cup) | | League Cup (Note: Malaysia Cup) | | Continental | | Other (Note: Piala Sumbangsih) | | Total | |
| Club | Season | Division | Apps | Goals | Apps | Goals | Apps | Goals | Apps | Goals | Apps | Goals | Apps | Goals |
|---|---|---|---|---|---|---|---|---|---|---|---|---|---|---|
| Kuala Lumpur City | 2021 | Malaysia Super League | 7 | 0 | 0 | 0 | 11 | 1 | – | | 0 | 0 | 18 | 1 |
| Kuala Lumpur City | 2022 | Malaysia Super League | 16 | 4 | 2 | 0 | 2 | 0 | 7 | 0 | 1 | 0 | 28 | 4 |
| Kuala Lumpur City | 2023 | Malaysia Super League | 22 | 0 | 4 | 0 | 4 | 0 | 0 | 0 | 0 | 0 | 30 | 0 |
| Kuala Lumpur City | 2024-25 | Malaysia Super League | 21 | 1 | 1 | 0 | 3 | 2 | 5 | 0 | 0 | 0 | 30 | 3 |
| Kuala Lumpur City | 2025-26 | Malaysia Super League | 4 | 0 | 1 | 0 | 0 | 0 | 0 | 0 | 0 | 0 | 5 | 0 |
| Kuala Lumpur City | Total | | 70 | 5 | 8 | 0 | 20 | 3 | 12 | 0 | 1 | 0 | 111 | 8 |
| Career total | | | 70 | 5 | 8 | 0 | 20 | 3 | 12 | 0 | 1 | 0 | 111 | 8 |

== Honours ==
KL City

- Malaysia Cup: 2021
- AFC Cup runner-up: 2022
- Malaysian FA Cup runner-up: 2023
