= Muhaimin Izuddin =

Malaysian professional footballer

Personal information
- Full name: Muhaimin Izuddin bin Muhammad Asri
- Date of birth: 4 August 2002 (age 24)
- Place of birth: Pasir Mas, Kelantan, Malaysia
- Height: 1.69 m (5 ft 6 1/2 in)
- Position: Midfielder

Team information
- Current team: Kelantan Red Warrior
- Number: 88

Youth career
- 2020: Kelantan U19

Senior career*
Years	Team	Apps	(Gls)
2021	FAM-MSN Project	18	(1)
2022–2023	Kelantan	10	(0)
2024	Penang	1	(0)
2024–2025	Kelantan Darul Naim	4	(0)
2025–	Kelantan Red Warrior	1	(0)
- * Club domestic league appearances and goals as of 22 August 2025

Muhaimin Izuddin bin Muhammad Asri (born 4 August 2002) is a Malaysian professional footballer who plays as a midfielder for Malaysia A1 Semi-Pro League club Kelantan Red Warrior.

== Club career ==
=== Kelantan ===
Muhaimin started his career with Kelantan Youth team before joined FAM-MSN Project in 2021. On 7 January 2022, Muhaimin rejoined the club after one season represented FAM-MSN Project. On 16 April 2022, Muhaimin made his debut for the club in 3–1 win over Perak during Malaysia Premier League match.

== Career statistics ==
=== Club ===
As of match played 25 February 2023

Appearances and goals by club, season and competition
Club	Season	League			Cup		League Cup		Continental		Total	
Club	Season	Division	Apps	Goals	Apps	Goals	Apps	Goals	Apps	Goals	Apps	Goals
Kelantan	2022	Malaysia Premier League	9	0	0	0	3	0	–		12	0
Kelantan	2023	Malaysia Super League	1	0	0	0	0	0	–		1	0
Kelantan	Total		10	0	0	0	3	0	–		13	2
Career Total			0	0	0	0	0	0	–	–	0	0
