= Kang Yi-chan =

South Korean footballer

Personal information
- Date of birth: 9 January 2001 (age 25)
- Place of birth: South Korea
- Height: 1.79 m (5 ft 10 in)
- Position: Winger

Youth career
- 2011–2012: Seongnae Elementary School
- 2013–2014: Doonchon Middle School
- 2014–2015: Dongbuk Middle School
- 2016–2018: Jeju United U18
- 2019–2021: Kyung Hee University

Senior career*
Years	Team	Apps	(Gls)
2022	Gangwon FC Reserves	10	(0)
2023	Kelantan	5	(0)

International career^{‡}
2016	South Korea U16	4	(0)
2018	South Korea U17	0	(0)
Korean name
Hangul	강의찬
RR	Gang Uichan
MR	Kang Ŭich'an
- * Club domestic league appearances and goals as of 8 July 2023 ‡ National team caps and goals as of 27 July 2022

Kang Yi-chan (Korean: 강의찬; born 9 January 2001) is a South Korean professional footballer who plays as a winger.

== Early life and career ==
As a youth player, Kang played for Kyung Hee University.

== Club career ==
Kang started his career with Gangwon FC.

After that, he signed for Kelantan. He impressed the manager and supporters with his performances while on trial.

== International career ==
Kang has represented South Korea at youth level.

== Style of play ==
Kang mainly operates as a winger.

== Career statistics ==
=== Club ===
As of match played 25 February 2023

Appearances and goals by club, season and competition
Club	Season	League			Cup		League Cup		Continental		Total	
Club	Season	Division	Apps	Goals	Apps	Goals	Apps	Goals	Apps	Goals	Apps	Goals
Kelantan	2023	Malaysia Super League	1	0	0	0	0	0	–		1	0
Kelantan	Total		1	0	0	0	0	0	–		1	0
Career Total			0	0	0	0	0	0	–	–	0	0
