= 2021 Kelantan F.C. season =

Kelantan
2021 season
- Chairman: Norizam Tukiman
- Head coach: Marco Ragini
- Stadium: Sultan Muhammad IV Stadium
- Malaysia Premier League: 6th
- Malaysia Cup: Group stage
- Top goalscorer: League: Nurshamil Abd Ghani (9); All: Nurshamil Abd Ghani (9)
- Highest home attendance: 0
- Lowest home attendance: 0
- Average home league attendance: 0
Home colours	Away colours	Third colours
- All statistics correct as of 17 November 2021.

The 2021 season was Kelantan's 76th year in their history and third season in the Malaysia Premier League since 2019 following relegation 2018 season. Along with the league, the club will also compete in the Malaysia Cup.

== Events ==
On 14 January 2021, the club announced Marco Ragini as Kelantan head coach.

On 13 February 2021, Natanael Siringo Ringo signed a one-year contract with the club.

17 February 2021, three new foreign players joined the club. Mario Arqués, Jack Hindle and Christos Intzidis.

On 5 May 2021, two players from the club have been tested positive for COVID-19 before league match against Selangor II.

On 24 June 2021, Zubir Azmi signed a contract with Kelantan from Sabah.

On 11 August 2021, the club won 3–1 over Kelantan United.

== Squad ==
As of match played 25 August 2021

No.	Player	Nationality	Position	Date of birth (age)	Signed from	Signed in
Goalkeepers
1	Asfa Abidin	(Malaysia)	GK	28 August 1999 (age 26)	Selangor II	2021
13	Nik Amin Ahmad	(Malaysia)	GK	10 January 1997 (age 29)	Terengganu II	2021
20	Faridzuean Kamaruddin	(Malaysia)	GK	30 March 1995 (age 31)	Kuala Lumpur City	2020
30	Farizal Harun	(Malaysia)	GK	2 February 1986 (age 40)	Selangor	2021
Defenders
4	Ghaffar Abdul Rahman	(Malaysia)	CB	5 April 1998 (age 28)	Johor Darul Ta'zim II	2021
14	Wan Zulhairil Husin	(Malaysia)	CB	1 April 1999 (age 27)	Selangor II	2021
16	Zubir Azmi	(Malaysia)	LB	14 November 1991 (age 34)	Sabah	2021
23	Izaffiq Ruzi	(Malaysia)	LB	2 April 1997 (age 29)	Johor Darul Ta'zim II	2021
24	Yogaraj Murugan	(Malaysia)	LWB	17 July 1997 (age 28)	Petaling Jaya City	2021
27	Arip Amiruddin	(Malaysia)	RB	15 December 1992 (age 33)	Negeri Sembilan	2021
39	Christos Intzidis	(Greece)	CB	9 January 1993 (age 33)	Miercurea Ciuc	2021
55	Yusri Yushasmadi	(Malaysia)	CB	7 December 1996 (age 29)	Kuala Lumpur Rovers	2021
72	Syaqimi Rozi	(Malaysia)	LB / LWB / LW	20 March 2002 (age 24)	Youth system	2021
93	Che Mohamad Safwan (vice-captain)	(Malaysia)	RB	15 December 1995 (age 30)	Negeri Sembilan	2021
Midfielders
8	Syed Sobri	(Malaysia)	CM / RM	24 May 1994 (age 31)	UKM	2021
9	Dzulfahmi Abdul Hadi	(Malaysia)	AM	25 August 1994 (age 31)	Kuala Lumpur City	2021
11	Natanael Siringo	(Indonesia)	RW	18 September 1999 (age 26)	Sulut United	2021
17	Kavishkumar Manimaharan	(Malaysia)	RW	29 August 1997 (age 28)	Melaka United	2021
18	Syafiq Heelmi	(Malaysia)	LM	15 March 1998 (age 28)	Johor Darul Ta'zim II	2021
21	Fathullah Fazilisham	(Malaysia)	AM	30 May 1997 (age 28)	Youth system	2021
29	Mior Dani Armin	(Malaysia)	AM	19 January 1999 (age 27)	Selangor II	2021
69	Haziq Subri	(Malaysia)	LW	6 September 1999 (age 26)	Perak II	2021
71	Hafizan Ghazali	(Malaysia)	AM / ST	14 September 2002 (age 23)	Youth system	2021
Forwards
10	Jack Hindle	(England)	ST	29 October 1993 (age 32)	Barrow	2021
19	Nurshamil Abd Ghani	(Malaysia)	ST	25 September 1994 (age 31)	Penang	2021
33	Aniq Arami	(Malaysia)	ST	27 March 2000 (age 26)	Terengganu III	2021
96	Ismail Ibrahim	(Malaysia)	ST	30 January 2001 (age 25)	Youth system	2021
Left during the season
12	Fathi Irfan	(Malaysia)	CB	31 March 1998 (age 28)	Youth system	2021
66	Aizzat Maidin	(Malaysia)	RB	27 May 1997 (age 28)	Kelantan United	2021
	Arif Izwan	(Malaysia)	GK	5 November 1998 (age 27)	Selangor II	2021
6	Mario Arqués	(Spain)	CM	19 January 1992 (age 34)	Kerala Blasters	2021

== Technical staff ==
Position	Name
Team manager	(Malaysia) Qusmaini Noor Rusli
Head coach	(Italy) Marco Ragini
Assistant coach	(Malaysia) Mohd Azli Mahmood
Assistant head coach	(Malaysia) Rezal Zambery Yahya
Goalkeeper coach	(Malaysia) Abdul Rahman Baba
Fitness coach	(Malaysia) Ahmad Nizan Ariffin
Team doctor	(Malaysia) Zairuddin Abdullah Zawawi
Physiotherapist	(Malaysia) Muhammad Syahiran Sahul Hamed

== Competitions ==
=== Malaysia Premier League ===
==== League table ====
Pos	Team	Pld	W	D	L	GF	GA	GD	Pts	Qualification or relegation
4	Johor Darul Ta'zim II (Note: Johor Darul Ta'zim II, Perak II, Selangor II and Terengganu II cannot be promoted from Malaysia Premier League and play in Malaysia Cup as Johor Darul Ta'zim F.C., Perak FA, Selangor F.C. and Terengganu FC (their parent clubs) remain in Malaysia Super League and play in Malaysia Cup. Should the team be relegated to Malaysia Premier League or will not play in Malaysia Cup, Johor Darul Ta'zim II, Perak II, Selangor II and Terengganu II will have to drop to Malaysia M3 League or will play in Malaysia Cup.)	20	9	7	4	38	20	+18	34	
5	Kuching City	20	7	6	7	22	22	0	27	Qualification for the Malaysia Cup group stage
6	Kelantan	20	8	3	9	23	28	−5	27	Qualification for the Malaysia Cup group stage
7	Kelantan United	20	8	2	10	25	28	−3	26	Qualification for the Malaysia Cup group stage
8	PDRM	20	7	5	8	22	25	−3	26	

Source: MFL
Rules for classification: 1) Points; 2) Goal difference; 3) Number of goals scored.

==== Results by round ====
Round	1	2	3	4	5	6	7	8	9	10	11	12	13	14	15	16	17	18	19	20
Ground	H	A	A	A	H	A	H	A	A	A	A	H	H	H	A	H	A	H	H	H
Result	L	W	W	D	L	W	W	L	D	L	D	W	L	L	L	W	L	W	L	W
Position	8	5	4	3	6	6	4	4	5	5	6	4	5	7	8	7	7	7	7	6

Updated to match(es) played on 21 September 2021. Source: Malaysia Premier League
A = Away; H = Home; W = Win; D = Draw; L = Loss

==== Matches ====
6 March 2021 1	Kelantan	0–1	Perak II
MYT (UTC+8)

9 March 2021 2	FAM-MSN Project	1–2	Kelantan
MYT (UTC+8)

13 March 2021 3	PDRM	1–2	Kelantan
MYT (UTC+8)

16 March 2021 4	Terengganu II	0–0	Kelantan
MYT (UTC+8)

3 April 2021 5	Kelantan	0–1	Sarawak United
MYT (UTC+8)

6 April 2021 6	Kelantan United	0–2	Kelantan
MYT (UTC+8)

10 April 2021 7	Kelantan	1–0	Kuching City
MYT (UTC+8)

18 April 2021 8	Negeri Sembilan	2–1	Kelantan
MYT (UTC+8)

23 April 2021 9	Johor Darul Ta'zim II	1–1	Kelantan
MYT (UTC+8)

3 May 2021 10	Selangor II	3–1	Kelantan
MYT (UTC+8)

17 July 2021 11	Perak II	1–1	Kelantan
MYT (UTC+8)

24 July 2021 12	Kelantan	2–1	FAM-MSN Project
MYT (UTC+8)

28 July 2021 13	Kelantan	1–2	PDRM
MYT (UTC+8)

31 July 2021 14	Kelantan	0–2	Terengganu II
MYT (UTC+8)

7 August 2021 15	Sarawak United	3–1	Kelantan
MYT (UTC+8)

11 August 2021 16	Kelantan	3–1	Kelantan United
MYT (UTC+8)

21 August 2021 17	Kuching City	3–1	Kelantan
MYT (UTC+8)

27 August 2021 18	Kelantan	2–1	Negeri Sembilan
MYT (UTC+8)

11 September 2021 19	Kelantan	0–3	Johor Darul Ta'zim II
MYT (UTC+8)

21 September 2021 20	Kelantan	2–1	Selangor II
MYT (UTC+8)

=== Malaysia Cup ===
==== Group stage ====
Pos	Team	Pld	W	D	L	GF	GA	GD	Pts	Qualification	JDT	SBH	PJC	KEL
1	Johor Darul Ta'zim	6	6	0	0	14	1	+13	18	Quarter-finals	—	3–0	1–0	2–0
2	Sabah	6	2	2	2	6	9	−3	8	Quarter-finals	0–2	—	1–0	2–1
3	Petaling Jaya City	6	1	2	3	5	6	−1	5		1–2	1–1	—	3–1
4	Kelantan	6	0	2	4	4	13	−9	2		0–4	2–2	0–0	—

Source: MFL, FAM

27 September 2021 1	Johor Darul Ta'zim	2–0	Kelantan
MYT (UTC+8)

30 September 2021 2	Kelantan	2–2	Sabah
MYT (UTC+8)

29 October 2021 3	Petaling Jaya City	3–1	Kelantan
MYT (UTC+8)

2 November 2021 4	Kelantan	0–0	Petaling Jaya City
MYT (UTC+8)

6 November 2021 5	Sabah	2–1	Kelantan
MYT (UTC+8)

9 November 2021 6	Kelantan	0–4	Sabah
MYT (UTC+8)

== Statistics ==
=== Appearances and goals ===
No.	Pos	Nat	Player	Total		League		Malaysia Cup	
No.	Pos	Nat	Player	Apps	Goals	Apps	Goals	Apps	Goals
Goalkeepers
1	GK	(Malaysia) MAS	Asfa Abiddin	0	0	0	0	0	0
13	GK	(Malaysia) MAS	Nik Amin Ahmad	5	0	5	0	0	0
20	GK	(Malaysia) MAS	Faridzuean Kamaruddin	15	0	10+1	0	4	0
30	GK	(Malaysia) MAS	Farizal Harun	7	0	5	0	2	0
Defenders
4	DF	(Malaysia) MAS	Ghaffar Abdul Rahman	16	0	8+2	0	6	0
14	DF	(Malaysia) MAS	Zulhairil Husin	11	0	3+8	0	0	0
16	DF	(Malaysia) MAS	Zubir Azmi	16	0	7+3	0	6	0
23	DF	(Malaysia) MAS	Izaffiq Ruzi	18	0	12+3	0	1+2	0
24	DF	(Malaysia) MAS	Yogaraj Murugan	10	0	6+3	0	0+1	0
27	DF	(Malaysia) MAS	Arip Amiruddin	16	0	6+4	0	4+2	0
39	DF	(Greece) GRE	Christos Intzidis	24	3	20	2	4	1
55	DF	(Malaysia) MAS	Yusri Yuhasmadi	25	0	19	0	6	0
72	DF	(Malaysia) MAS	Syaqimi Rozi	10	0	5+3	0	0+2	0
93	DF	(Malaysia) MAS	Che Mohd Safwan	18	1	9+4	0	3+2	1
Midfielders
8	MF	(Malaysia) MAS	Syed Sobri	12	2	5+1	2	6	0
9	MF	(Malaysia) MAS	Dzulfahmi Abdul Hadi	15	0	6+3	0	5+1	0
11	MF	(Indonesia) IDN	Natanael Siringo	19	4	14+3	3	2	1
17	MF	(Malaysia) MAS	Kavishkumar Manimaharan	1	0	1	0	0	0
18	MF	(Malaysia) MAS	Syafiq Heelmi	15	0	8+7	0	0	0
21	MF	(Malaysia) MAS	Fathullah Fazilisham	5	0	1+4	0	0	0
29	MF	(Malaysia) MAS	Mior Dani Armin	17	1	7+4	1	6	0
69	MF	(Malaysia) MAS	Haziq Subri	23	1	14+3	0	5+1	1
71	MF	(Malaysia) MAS	Hafizan Ghazali	15	0	7+3	0	1+4	0
77	MF	(Malaysia) MAS	Syahir Ab.Rashid	2	0	0	0	0+2	0
Forwards
10	FW	(England) ENG	Jack Hindle	10	3	9+1	3	0	0
19	FW	(Malaysia) MAS	Nurshamil Abd Ghani	22	9	8+10	9	4	0
33	FW	(Malaysia) MAS	Aniq Arami	7	0	0+7	0	0	0
96	FW	(Malaysia) MAS	Ismail Ibrahim	8	1	2+3	1	1+2	0
Players transferred out during the season
6	MF	(Spain) ESP	Mario Arqués	19	2	19	2	0	0
12	DF	(Malaysia) MAS	Fathi Irfan	1	0	0+1	0	0	0
66	DF	(Malaysia) MAS	Aizzat Maidin	9	0	4+5	0	0	0

Last updated: 9 November 2021
Source: Competitions

== See also ==
- 2021 Kelantan United F.C. season
