= Gerald Gadit =

Malaysian professional footballer

Personal information
- Date of birth: 16 May 1999 (age 27)
- Place of birth: Tenom, Sabah, Malaysia
- Height: 1.82 m (6 ft 0 in)
- Positions: Centre-back; full-back

Team information
- Current team: Gombak
- Number: 37

Youth career
- 2016: SMK Datuk Peter Mojuntin
- 2018: Sabah U20

Senior career*
Years	Team	Apps	(Gls)
2021	Sabah	5	(0)
2023	→ Kelantan (loan)	7	(0)
2024–2025	Gombak		

International career
2018	Malaysia U19	6	(0)
2021	Malaysia U23	1	(0)
Medal record
Men's football
Representing Malaysia
Malaysia U-19
ASEAN U-19 Boys' Championship
Winner	2018
- * Club domestic league appearances and goals

Gerald Gadit (born 16 May 1999) is a Malaysian professional footballer who plays as a centre-back.

Gerald has been called by Brad Maloney for the 2022 AFF U-23 Championship.

== Club career ==
In 2021, Gerald who plays for the Piala Presiden Sabah squad was called to join the senior squad of Sabah F.C. in the Malaysia Super League.

== International career ==
In January 2022, Gerald was called up to the national under-23 team, led by Brad Maloney, as the 2022 AFF U-23 Championship starts in February 2022 that was held in Phnom Penh, Cambodia.

== Career statistics ==
=== Club ===
As of match played 25 February 2023

Appearances and goals by club, season and competition
Club	Season	League			Cup		League Cup		Continental		Total	
Club	Season	Division	Apps	Goals	Apps	Goals	Apps	Goals	Apps	Goals	Apps	Goals
Kelantan (loan)	2023	Malaysia Super League	1	0	0	0	0	0	–		1	0
Kelantan (loan)	Total		1	0	0	0	0	0	–		1	0
Career Total			1	0	0	0	0	0	–	–	1	0

== Honours ==
=== International ===
Malaysia U-19

- AFF U-19 Youth Championship : 2018
