= Mior Dani =

Malaysian association football player

Personal information
- Full name: Mior Dani Armin bin Mior Ariffen
- Date of birth: 19 January 1999 (age 27)
- Place of birth: Selangor, Malaysia
- Height: 1.79 m (5 ft 10 in)
- Position: Midfielder

Team information
- Current team: Immigration
- Number: 19

Youth career
- 2018–2019: PKNS

Senior career*
Years	Team	Apps	(Gls)
2020	Selangor II	1	(0)
2021–2023	Kelantan	20	(1)
2022	→ Sri Pahang (loan)	11	(0)
2023	→ Kedah Darul Aman (loan)	9	(0)
2024–2025	Kelantan Darul Naim	11	(0)
2025–	Immigration		
- * Club domestic league appearances and goals

Mior Dani Armin bin Mior Ariffen (born 19 January 1999) is a Malaysian professional footballer who plays as a midfielder for Malaysia Super League club Immigration.

Mior Dani started his football career playing for PKNS youth team in 2018, before joining Selangor II in 2020.

== Club career ==
=== Loan to Sri Pahang ===
On 8 June 2022, Mior Dani joined Malaysia Super League club Sri Pahang for 6-month loan for the remaining 2022 season. On 25 June 2022, Mior Dani made his debut for the club in a 0–3 defeat against Negeri Sembilan.

=== Loan to Kedah Darul Aman ===
On 30 December 2022, Mior Dani joined Kedah Darul Aman on loan for the 2023 season.

== International career ==
On 21 August 2018, Mior Dani was selected for the preliminary training camp Malaysia U-19, ahead of the 2018 AFC U-19 Championship.

== Career statistics ==
=== Club ===
As of match played 15 May 2025

Appearances and goals by club, season and competition
Club	Season	League			Cup		League Cup		Continental		Total	
Club	Season	Division	Apps	Goals	Apps	Goals	Apps	Goals	Apps	Goals	Apps	Goals
Selangor II	2020	Malaysia Premier League	1	0	–						1	0
Selangor II	Total		1	0	–						1	0
Kelantan	2021	Malaysia Premier League	11	1	–		6	0	–		17	1
Kelantan	2022	Malaysia Premier League	9	0	1	0	–				10	0
Kelantan	Total		20	1	1	0	6	0	–		27	1
Sri Pahang (loan)	2022	Malaysia Super League	11	0	0	0	1	0	–		12	0
Sri Pahang (loan)	Total		11	0	0	0	1	0	–		12	0
Kedah Darul Aman (loan)	2023	Malaysia Super League	9	0	0	0	1	0	–		10	0
Kedah Darul Aman (loan)	Total		9	0	0	0	1	0	–		10	0
Kelantan Darul Naim	2024–25	Malaysia Super League	11	0	1	0	2	0	–		14	0
Kelantan Darul Naim	Total		11	0	1	0	2	0	–		14	0
Career Total			52	1	2	0	10	0	–		64	1
