= Khairil Anuar =

Malaysian footballer

Personal information
- Full name: Ahmad Khairil Anuar bin Ahmad Zamri
- Date of birth: 8 March 1995 (age 31)
- Place of birth: Teluk Intan, Perak, Malaysia
- Height: 1.68 m (5 ft 6 in)
- Position: Midfielder

Team information
- Current team: Gombak (on loan from Penang)
- Number: 8

Youth career
- 2010–2015: Perak U-21
- 2013: → Harimau Muda C (loan)

Senior career*
Years	Team	Apps	(Gls)
2015–2020	Perak	57	(1)
2020	→ Perak II (loan)		
2021	Petaling Jaya City	9	(0)
2022	Sarawak United	12	(0)
2023	Kelantan		
2024–	Penang		
2024	→ Gombak (loan)		

International career
2017	Malaysia	1	(0)
- * Club domestic league appearances and goals

Ahmad Khairil Anuar bin Ahmad Zamri (born 8 March 1995) is a Malaysian professional footballer who plays as a midfielder.

== Club career ==
Born in Teluk Intan, Khairil started playing football since school and has represented Perak at age 9. He played for Perak youth team before being promoted to the first team in 2015.

== International career ==
On 6 November 2017, Khairil has received a call-up to the Malaysia senior side under head coach Nelo Vingada.

On 13 November 2017, Khairil made his debut for Malaysia national team in a 1–4 defeat to North Korea as a starter before came out at 46th minute and was replaced by Safiq Rahim.

== Career statistics ==
=== Club ===
As of 27 October 2022

Appearances and goals by club, season and competition
Club	Season	League			Cup		League Cup		Continental		Total	
Club	Season	Division	Apps	Goals	Apps	Goals	Apps	Goals	Apps	Goals	Apps	Goals
Perak	2015	Malaysia Super League	10	0	1 (Note: 17 March 2015, Malaysia FA Cup debut)	0	3 (Note: Except data from 26 September 2015)	1	—		14	1
Perak	2016	Malaysia Super League	13	1	6	1	3	0	—		22	2
Perak	2017	Malaysia Super League	7	0	1	0	5	0	—		13	0
Perak	2018	Malaysia Super League	15	0	4	0	5	0	—		24	0
Perak	2019	Malaysia Super League	11	0	1	0	0	0	2	0	14	0
Perak	2020	Malaysia Super League	1	0	0	0	0	0	—		1	0
Perak	Total		57	1	13	1	16	1	2	0	88	3
Petaling Jaya City	2021	Malaysia Super League	9	0	—		1	0	—		10	0
Petaling Jaya City	Total		9	0	—		1	0	—		10	0
Sarawak United	2022	Malaysia Super League	12	0	1	0	0	0	—		13	0
Sarawak United	Total		12	0	1	0	0	0	—		13	0
Kelantan	2023	Malaysia Super League	0	0	0	0	0	0	—		0	0
Kelantan	Total		0	0	0	0	0	0	0	0	0	0
Career Total			78	1	14	1	17	1	0	0	109	3

=== International ===
As of 13 November 2017

Appearances and goals by national team and year
National team	Year	Apps	Goals
Malaysia	2017	1	0
Total		1	0

== Honours ==
Perak

- Malaysia Super League Runner-up: 2018
- Malaysia Cup: 2018
- Malaysia FA Cup runner-up: 2019
