= Victor Andrag =

Malaysian footballer

- Victor with Kedah FA in 2008

Personal information
- Full name: Victor a/l Andrag
- Date of birth: 29 March 1976 (age 50)
- Place of birth: Kedah, Malaysia
- Position: Centre back

Team information
- Current team: Penang (head coach)

Senior career*
Years	Team	Apps	(Gls)
2001	Kedah Ansell	5	(0)
2002–2010	Kedah FA	130	(7)
Total		135	(7)

International career
2002	Malaysia	2	(0)

Managerial career
- 2012–2013: Penang (assistant)
- 2014–2018: Kedah Darul Aman (youth)
- 2019–2022: Kedah Darul Aman (assistant)
- 2022: Kedah Darul Aman (caretaker)
- 2024–2025: Kedah Darul Aman (interim)
- 2025–2026: Kedah FA
- 2026: Penang (technical director)
- 2026–: Penang (interim)
- * Club domestic league appearances and goals

Victor Andrag (born 29 March 1976) is a Malaysian former professional footballer who played primarily as a centre-back. He is best known long association with Kedah FA, where he also served as team captain. During his time with the club, Victor won every domestic honour available. Individually, Victor received the Best defender award for two consecutive seasons, in 2006–07 and 2007–08. He is currently the head coach of Malaysia Super League club Penang.

== Early life ==
Victor was raised in Bedong, a small town in Kedah located approximately 12 km north of Sungai Petani. He is the son of Andrag Narimuthu and Anamah Joseph. During his school years at Sultan Abdul Hamid College in Alor Setar, he was active as a 400-metre track athlete. He began his football career with Kedah Ansell, a club based in Kulim.

== Playing career ==
=== Kedah FA ===
Victor became one of the longest-serving and most experienced players at Kedah FA, having joined the team in 2002. He was appointed team captain following the departures of Akmal Rizal Ahmad Rakhli and Mohd Fauzi Nan. Under head coach Mohd Azraai Khor Abdullah, Victor was a key figure in central defence, although former coach Jørgen Erik Larsen had previously deployed him as a full-back. Known for his height and physical presence, he played a pivotal role in the team's defensive lineup.

Victor was part of the squad that achieved the historic double treble, winning the league, cup, and FA Cup titles in both the 2006–07 and 2007–08 seasons.

== International career ==
Victor was selected for the Malaysia national team under head coach Allan Harris for the 2002 AFF Championship. He made two appearances in the tournament, featuring in matches against Laos and Vietnam.

== Managerial career ==
=== Penang ===
Following his retirement from professional football, Victor served as an assistant coach at Penang FA in 2012, working under Hungarian head coach János Krecska.

=== Kedah ===
Victor later returned to Kedah FA in 2014, where he took on a role as a youth coach.

In 2019, Victor was appointed as assistant to Singaporean club Aidil Sharin Sahak at Kedah. On 17 October 2022, following Aidil Sharin’s departure, Victor was named interim head coach. He held the position until December 2022, when Nafuzi Zain, former head coach of Terengganu, was appointed as interim head coach of Kedah.

On 18 June 2025, Victor got his first managerial role where he took charge of A1 Semi-Pro League club Kedah FA.

== Managerial statistics ==
As of match played 22 November 2026

Managerial record by team and tenure
Team	Nat.	From	To	Record					Ref.
Team	Nat.	From	To	G	W	D	L	Win %	Ref.
Kedah Darul Aman (interim)	(Malaysia)	17 October 2022	30 November 2022	2	0	1	1	0.00	
Kedah Darul Aman (interim)	(Malaysia)	24 November 2024	17 June 2025	15	4	4	7	26.67	
Kedah FA	(Malaysia)	18 June 2025	8 June 2026	29	18	6	5	62.07	
Penang	(Malaysia)	1 November 2026	Present	1	1	0	0	100.00	
Career Total				47	23	11	13	48.94	

== Honours ==
=== Club ===
==== Kedah ====
- Malaysia Super League: 2006–07, 2007–08
- Malaysia Premier League: 2002, 2005–06
- Malaysia FA Cup: 2007, 2008
- Malaysia Cup: 2007, 2008

=== Individual ===
- Malaysia Super League 'Best Defender Award': 2006–07, 2007–08
