= 2015 Melaka United season =

Melaka United
2015 season
- President: Datuk Seri Ir. Idris Haron
- Head Coach: Mat Zan Mat Aris
- Stadium: Hang Jebat Stadium (capacity:40,000)
- Malaysia FAM League: Champion
- Malaysia FA Cup: Round of 16
- Malaysia Cup: Not Qualified
- Top goalscorer: League: Nurshamil Abdul Ghani; All: Nurshamil Abdul Ghani
- Highest home attendance: 38,000
Home colours

The 2015 Melaka United Season is Melaka United's 5th season playing football in the Malaysia FAM League since its inception after being relegated from Malaysia Premier League in 2010. They won the league this season and was promoted to Malaysia Premier League next season by topping the Group B table and won the cup by beating Perlis 3–2 in the final.

== Malaysia FAM League ==
=== League table ===
Pos	Team	Pld	W	D	L	GF	GA	GD	Pts	Promotion
1	Melaka United (C, P)	16	11	3	2	30	13	+17	36	Promotion to Premier League and final round
2	MISC-MIFA	16	11	3	2	33	17	+16	36	
3	Young Fighters	16	9	4	3	28	17	+11	31	Withdrew from FAM League and dissolved.
4	MOF	16	6	3	7	29	27	+2	21	
5	Kedah United	16	6	2	8	16	29	−13	20	Withdrew from FAM League and dissolved.

Source: FAM Official Site
Rules for classification: 1) Points; 2) Goal difference; 3) Number of goals scored
(C) Champions; (P) Promoted

=== Final ===
29 August 2015
20:45 UTC+8

Melaka United (Malacca)	3 – 2	Perlis
Nurshamil Abdul Ghani 38', 72', 90+2'	Report	Mohd Syafiq Azmi 15' (pen.), 60'

Hang Jebat Stadium, Melaka
Attendance: 38,000
Referee: Zulkifli Ahmad

== Malaysia FA Cup ==
Melaka United were eliminated in the first round (round of 32) of the 2015 Malaysia FA Cup. They lost 1–3 to Terengganu.

Win Draw Loss

28 February 2015
20:45 UTC+08:00
1st Round

Melaka United (Malacca)	1–3	Terengganu
Nurshamil 88' (pen.)	Report	Manaf 47'; Paulo Rangel 52', 72' (pen.); Azlan Zainal (red card) 74'

Hang Jebat Stadium, Melaka, Selayang, Selangor
Attendance: 15,000
Referee: Mohd Jefri Zolkefli

== Malaysia Cup ==
Melaka United does not participated in this year Malaysia Cup as they were not qualified for it.
