= 2022 Kelantan F.C. season =

Kelantan
2022 season
- Chairman: Norizam Tukiman
- Head coach: Rezal Zambery Yahya
- Stadium: Sultan Muhammad IV Stadium
- Malaysia Premier League: 2nd (promoted)
- FA Cup: First round
- Malaysia Cup: Quarter-finals
- Top goalscorer: League: Nurshamil Abd Ghani (9 goals); All: Nurshamil Abd Ghani (10 goals)
Home colours	Away colours	Third colours

The 2022 Kelantan season was the club's 77th season since its establishment. The club participated in the Malaysia Premier League, the Malaysia FA Cup and the Malaysia Cup.

== Technical staff ==
Position	Name
Manager	(Malaysia) Qusmaini Noor Rusli
Head coach	(Malaysia) Rezal Zambery Yahya
Assistant head coach	(Malaysia) Yusrizal Yusoff
Assistant coach	(Malaysia) Azli Mahmood
Goalkeeping coach	(Malaysia) Kharul Nizam Mohd Taib
Physiotherapist	(Malaysia) Syahiran Sahul Hamed
Team admin	(Spain) Pol Corpas Cuatrecasas

== Competitions ==
=== Malaysia Premier League ===
==== League table ====
Pos	Team	Pld	W	D	L	GF	GA	GD	Pts	Qualification or relegation
1	Johor Darul Ta'zim II (Note: Johor Darul Ta'zim II, Selangor II, and Terengganu II aren't eligible to promote as their parent clubs (Johor Darul Ta'zim, Selangor, and Terengganu) play in the Super League. These feeder teams can only play in leagues below their parents'. They also can't play in the Malaysian Cup as they're only eligible to play in the Malaysian Cup if their parents fail to do so (which is not possible currently).) (C)	18	13	3	2	38	13	+25	42	Relocated to 2023 MFL Cup
2	Kelantan	18	11	4	3	27	14	+13	37	Promotion to 2023 Super League and Qualification to 2022 Malaysia Cup
3	Kuching City	18	10	4	4	30	20	+10	34	Promotion to 2023 Super League and Qualification to 2022 Malaysia Cup
4	Terengganu II	18	10	3	5	29	18	+11	33	Relocated to 2023 MFL Cup
5	Kelantan United	18	6	7	5	23	19	+4	25	Promotion to 2023 Super League and Qualification to 2022 Malaysia Cup

Updated to match(es) played on 4 September 2022. Source: MFL
Rules for classification: 1) Points; 2) Goal difference; 3) Number of goals scored.
(C) Champions

==== Matches ====
5 March 2022 1	Johor Darul Ta'zim II	1–2	Kelantan
MYT (UTC+8)		Report	Natanael 8'; Jasmir 90'	Attendance: 425

18 March 2022 2	Projek FAM-MSN	0–1	Kelantan
MYT (UTC+8)		Report	Nixon 47'	Attendance: 1,130

25 March 2022 3	UiTM	0–3	Kelantan
MYT (UTC+8)		Report	Nurshamil 28'; Farhan 41'; Belfort 72'	Attendance: 719

11 April 2022 4	Kuching City	2–1	Kelantan
MYT (UTC+8)		Report	Yusri 32'	Attendance: 244

16 April 2022 5	Perak	1–3	Kelantan
MYT (UTC+8)		Report	Nurshamil 48', 71'; Sobri 66'	Attendance: 1,483

24 April 2022 6	PDRM	1–3	Kelantan
MYT (UTC+8)		Report	Nurshamil 49'; Nixon 68', 86'	Attendance: 472

8 May 2022 7	Terengganu II	0–1	Kelantan
MYT (UTC+8)		Report	Nurshamil 29'	Attendance: 396

22 May 2022 8	Selangor 2	0–1	Kelantan
MYT (UTC+8)		Report	Sobri 61'	Attendance: 800

27 May 2022 9	Kelantan	0–0	Kelantan United
MYT (UTC+8)		Report		Attendance: 1,157

18 July 2022 10	Kelantan	1–0	UiTM
MYT (UTC+8)	Sobri 77'	Report		Attendance: 1,975

22 July 2022 11	Kelantan	1–1	Johor Darul Ta'zim II
MYT (UTC+8)	Nurshamil 19'	Report		Attendance: 6,786

31 July 2022 12	Kelantan	2–0	Kuching City
MYT (UTC+8)	Nixon 45+3' (pen.); Ikhwan 74'	Report		Attendance: 8,694+

5 August 2022 13	Kelantan	1–0	Projek FAM-MSN
MYT (UTC+8)	Latiff 76'	Report		Attendance: 5,103

10 August 2022 14	Kelantan	1–2	Perak
MYT (UTC+8)	Jasmir 2'	Report		Attendance: 8,173

13 August 2022 15	Kelantan	2–1	PDRM
MYT (UTC+8)	Nurshamil 68' (pen.); Ikhwan 77'	Report		Attendance: 4,128

21 August 2022 16	Kelantan	2–2	Terengganu II
MYT (UTC+8)	Nurshamil 5'; Dzulfahmi 12'	Report		Attendance: 8,312

4 September 2022 17	Kelantan	1–2	Selangor 2
MYT (UTC+8)	Ghaffar 76'	Report		Attendance: 726

30 September 2022 18	Kelantan United	1–1	Kelantan
MYT (UTC+8)		Report	Nurshamil 36' (pen.)	Attendance: 8,083

=== Malaysia FA Cup ===
13 March 2022 First round	Petaling Jaya City	2–1	Kelantan
MYT (UTC+8)		Report	Antar 18'	Attendance: 912

=== Malaysia Cup ===
26 October 2022 Round of 16 first leg	Sarawak United	0–1	Kelantan
MYT (UTC+8)		Report	Kenta Hara 82'	Attendance: 570

31 October 2022 Round of 16 second leg	Kelantan	1–1 (2–1 agg.)	Sarawak United
MYT (UTC+8)	Nurshamil 13'	Report		Attendance: 4,369

5 November 2022 Quarter-finals first leg	Kelantan	0–3	Johor Darul Ta'zim
MYT (UTC+8)				Attendance: 20,011

11 November 2022 Quarter-finals second leg	Johor Darul Ta'zim	5–0 (8–0 agg.)	Kelantan
MYT (UTC+8)				Attendance: 27,320

== Squad statistics ==
=== Appearances and goals ===
As of 11 November 2022

No.	Pos	Nat	Player	Total		League		FA Cup		Malaysia Cup	
No.	Pos	Nat	Player	Apps	Goals	Apps	Goals	Apps	Goals	Apps	Goals
Goalkeepers:
1	GK	(Malaysia) MAS	Solehin Mamat	5	0	3	0	1	0	1	0
13	GK	(Malaysia) MAS	Nik Mohd Amin	20	0	15+1	0	0	0	3+1	0
23	GK	(Malaysia) MAS	Asfa Abiddin	0	0	0	0	0	0	0	0
Defenders:
3	DF	(Malaysia) MAS	Khairul Helmi Johari	18	0	13	0	1	0	4	0
4	DF	(Malaysia) MAS	Ghaffar Rahman	15	1	9+2	1	0	0	4	0
5	DF	(Malaysia) MAS	Yusri Yuhasmadi	22	1	15+2	1	1	0	4	0
7	DF	(Malaysia) MAS	Arip Amiruddin	16	0	9+3	0	1	0	3	0
14	DF	(Malaysia) MAS	Danial Hadri	15	0	11+3	0	1	0	0	0
32	DF	(Malaysia) MAS	Osman Yusoff	9	0	5+2	0	0	0	0+2	0
33	DF	(Malaysia) MAS	Latiff Suhaimi	9	1	1+4	1	0	0	4	0
72	DF	(Malaysia) MAS	Syaqimi Rozi	5	0	1	0	0	0	0+4	0
86	DF	(Malaysia) MAS	Adam Nadzmi	2	0	1	0	0	0	1	0
97	DF	(Malaysia) MAS	Shafiq Al-Hafiz	6	0	0+2	0	0	0	4	0
Midfielders:
6	MF	(Malaysia) MAS	Jasmir Mehat	18	2	9+6	2	0	0	3	0
8	MF	(Malaysia) MAS	Syed Sobri	15	3	12+2	3	1	0	0	0
11	MF	(Malaysia) MAS	Dzulfahmi Hadi	12	1	8+2	1	0	0	2	0
17	MF	(Malaysia) MAS	Fazrul Amir	16	0	10+2	0	0+1	0	3	0
18	MF	(Malaysia) MAS	Shahrul Igwan	10	0	5+4	0	0	0	0+1	0
20	MF	(Malaysia) MAS	Shyamierul Razmee	1	0	1	0	0	0	0	0
25	MF	(Japan) JPN	Kenta Hara	12	1	5+3	0	0	0	1+3	1
28	MF	(Malaysia) MAS	Azrie Basalie	1	0	0+1	0	0	0	0	0
30	MF	(Malaysia) MAS	Mathias Mansor	4	0	1+2	0	0	0	0+1	0
55	MF	(Brazil) BRA	Felipe Hereda	10	0	7	0	0	0	1+2	0
66	MF	(Malaysia) MAS	Ikhwan Yazek	15	2	1+11	2	0	0	0+3	0
77	MF	(Malaysia) MAS	Syahir Ab Rashid	1	0	0	0	0	0	0+1	0
98	MF	(Malaysia) MAS	Adam Malique	0	0	0	0	0	0	0	0
Forwards:
9	FW	(Brazil) BRA	Nixon Guylherme	13	4	6+6	4	1	0	0	0
10	FW	(Haiti) HAI	Kervens Belfort	11	1	9+1	1	1	0	0	0
12	FW	(Malaysia) MAS	Alifh Aiman	7	0	2+4	0	0	0	1	0
19	FW	(Malaysia) MAS	Nurshamil Abd Ghani	17	10	13+2	9	0	0	2	1
88	FW	(Malaysia) MAS	Muhaimin Izuddin	12	0	5+4	0	0	0	3	0
Players that have left the club:
22	FW	(Lebanon) LBN	Fadel Antar	3	1	1+1	0	1	1	0	0
29	MF	(Malaysia) MAS	Mior Dani	10	0	9	0	1	0	0	0
35	MF	(Malaysia) MAS	Farhan Roslan	7	1	3+3	1	0+1	0	0	0
95	DF	(Malaysia) MAS	Che Mohd Arif	7	0	3+3	0	0+1	0	0	0
99	MF	(Indonesia) IDN	Natanael Siringoringo	8	1	5+2	1	1	0	0	0

- Source: FAM
