= Mario Arqués =

Spanish footballer

Personal information
- Full name: Mario Arqués Blasco
- Date of birth: 14 January 1992 (age 34)
- Place of birth: Madrid, Spain
- Height: 1.85 m (6 ft 1 in)
- Position: Midfielder

Team information
- Current team: Kuala Lumpur City
- Number: 8

Youth career
- Villarreal

Senior career*
Years	Team	Apps	(Gls)
2011–2012	Villarreal C	0	(0)
2011–2012	→ Orihuela (loan)	30	(0)
2012–2014	Valencia B	59	(1)
2014–2015	Elche B	35	(7)
2015	Elche	1	(0)
2015–2016	Sporting Gijón B	34	(3)
2016–2017	Alcoyano	17	(0)
2017	Karpaty Lviv	5	(0)
2018	Alcoyano	17	(1)
2018–2019	Jamshedpur	18	(3)
2019–2020	Kerala Blasters	6	(0)
2021	Kelantan	19	(2)
2021–2022	Newcastle Jets	14	(0)
2022	Song Lam Nghe An	7	(1)
2023	Kelantan	12	(1)
2023	PDRM	2	(0)
2025–	Kuala Lumpur City	0	(0)
- * Club domestic league appearances and goals as of 25 February 2023

Mario Arqués Blasco (born 14 January 1992) is a Spanish footballer who plays as a midfielder for Malaysia Super League club Kuala Lumpur City.

== Club career ==
Arqués was born in Alicante, Valencia. A product of Villarreal CF's youth system, he made his senior debuts while on loan at Orihuela CF in the 2011–12 campaign, in Segunda División B.

On Arqués moved to another reserve team, Valencia CF Mestalla also in the third level. He featured regularly for the side under the course of two seasons, being also an unused substitute in a 1–1 Copa del Rey home draw against Real Madrid on 23 January 2013.

On 22 July 2014 Arqués signed a two-year deal with neighbouring Elche CF, being assigned to the B-team in the same division. He made his first team – and La Liga – debut on 25 April 2015, replacing Pedro Mosquera in the 85th minute of a 0–3 away loss against Atlético Madrid.

=== Sporting de Gijon B ===
On 18 August 2015 Arqués joined Sporting de Gijón B, also in the third division.

=== CD Alcoyano ===
The following 9 August, he moved to fellow league team CD Alcoyano.

=== Jamshedpur FC ===
On 3 September 2018, Arqués joined the Indian Super League side Jamshedpur FC.

=== Kerala Blasters ===
On 29 May 2019, Mario Arqués joined the Indian Super League club Kerala Blasters.

=== Kelantan FC ===
On 14 February 2021, Mario Arqués joined the Malaysian Premier League club Kelantan FC. On 7 March 2021, he made his league debut for Kelantan FC in 0 - 1 loss against Perak FC II.

=== Newcastle Jets ===
On 13 October 2021, Arqués joined A-League Men club Newcastle Jets.

=== Sông Lam Nghệ An ===
On 12 August 2022, Arqués joined V.League 1 club Song Lam Nghe An. He played 7 games and had 1 goal, 2 assists.

=== Kelantan ===
On 31 January 2023, Mario moved to Malaysia to signed a contract with Kelantan FC in Malaysia Super League.

=== PDRM ===
On 1 August 2023, Mario had agreed to sign contract with PDRM FC.

== Honours ==
PDRM

- MFL Challenge Cup: 2023

== Career statistics ==
As of match played 25 February 2023

Club	Season	League			Cup		Other		Total	
Club	Season	Division	Apps	Goals	Apps	Goals	Apps	Goals	Apps	Goals
Orihuela	2011–12	Segunda División B	27	0	2	0	—		29	0
Valencia B	2012–13	Segunda División B	34	1	—		—		34	1
Valencia B	2013–14	Segunda División B	25	0	—		—		25	0
Elche B	2014–15	Segunda División B	35	7	—		—		35	7
Elche	2014–15	La Liga	1	0	—		—		1	0
Gijón B	2015–16	Segunda División B	34	3	—		—		34	3
Alcoyano	2016–17	Segunda División B	17	1	1	0	—		18	1
Karpaty Lviv	2017–18	Ukrainian Premier League	5	0	—		—		5	0
Alcoyano	2017–18	Segunda División B	17	0	—		—		17	0
Jamshedpur	2018–19	Indian Super League	18	3	—		—		18	3
Kerala Blasters	2019–20	Indian Super League	6	0	—		—		6	0
Kelantan	2021	Malaysia Premier League	19	2	—		—		19	2
Newcastle Jets	2021–22	A-League	14	0	0	0	—		14	0
Song Lam Nghe An	2022	V.League 1	7	1	0	0	—		7	1
Kelantan	2023	Malaysia Super League	1	0	0	0	—		1	0
Career total			260	18	3	0	0	0	263	18
