= Kedah FA state football team =

Malaysian football club

Kedah
- Full name: Kedah FA state football team
- Short name: KFA
- Founded: 1924; 102 years ago, as Kedah Amateur Football Association; 2025; 1 year ago, as Kedah FA state football team (revived)
- Ground: Darul Aman Stadium
- Capacity: 32,387
- Owner: Kedah Football Association
- Head coach: Akmal Rizal
- League: Malaysia A1 Semi-Pro League
- 2025–26: A1 Semi-Pro League, 3rd of 16
- Website: Kedah FA
Home colours	Away colours

Kedah FA state football team (Malay: Pasukan Bola Sepak Negeri Kedah), also known as Kedah FA, is a Malaysian developmental football club based in Alor Setar, Kedah. The club is governed and funded by the Kedah Football Association, representing the state of Kedah in the second-tier Malaysia A1 Semi-Pro League. The club's home ground is 32,387 capacity Darul Aman Stadium.

== History ==
Kedah FA state football team was revived at the Malaysian football scene by participating in the second-tier Malaysia A1 Semi-Pro League. The Amateur Football League (AFL) has announced clubs for the 2025–26 Malaysia A1 Semi-Pro League season. Among them is Kedah FA, alongside Kedah Darul Aman, which had previously been expelled from the Malaysia Super League due to licensing issues. Kedah FA state football team is a separate entity and does not inherit the history or honours of Kedah Darul Aman.

== Kit manufacturers and shirt sponsors ==
Season	Kit manufacturer	Main sponsors	Other sponsors
2025–	Mitre	Experience Kedah	MBI, PKNK, Pancaran Matahari, CT Global

== Ground ==
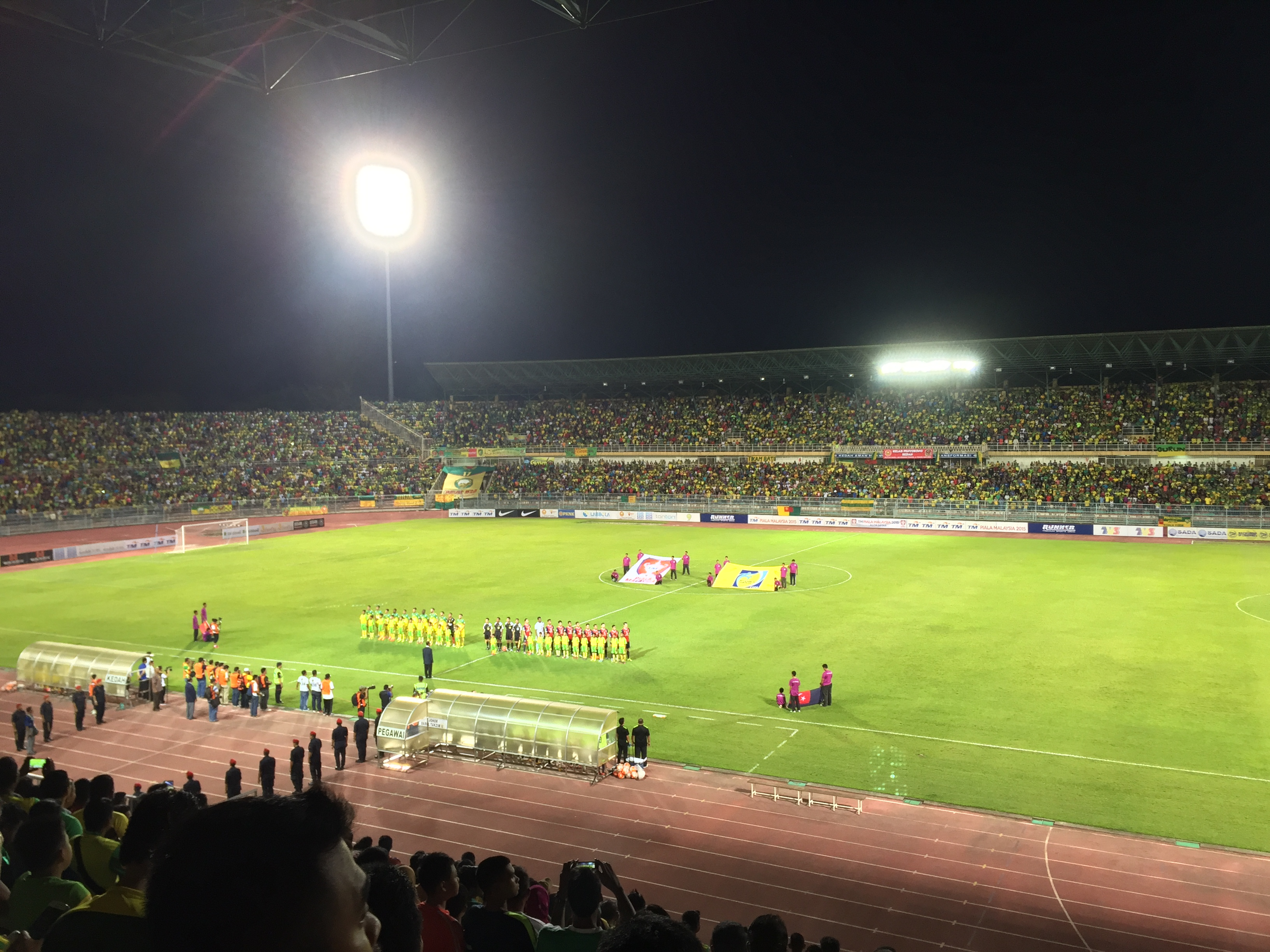
Darul Aman Stadium

Kedah FA is currently based at the multi-purpose all-seater Darul Aman Stadium. The stadium was opened by the Sultan of Kedah, Dziaddin Mukarram Shah I in 1962. It has a capacity of 32,387.

== Players ==
=== Current squad ===
As of August 2026

Note: Flags indicate national team as defined under FIFA eligibility rules; some limited exceptions apply. Players may hold more than one non-FIFA nationality.

No.	Pos.	Nation	Player
1	GK	MAS	Muhammad Ashraf Fadhil
2	DF	MAS	Safwan Shuhaimi^{U22}
3	DF	MAS	Hazrie Balqief^{U22}
4	MF	MAS	Asnan Ahmad
6	DF	MAS	Kamil Akmal Halim
8	DF	MAS	Muhammad Azim Anuar
9	FW	KEN	Raymond Murugi
10	MF	GHA	Anthony Arthur
11	DF	MAS	Afzal Akbar
12	MF	MAS	R. Barathkumar (Captain)
13	DF	MAS	Aiman Farhan Fauzi
14	MF	MAS	Afif Dinie Salmi^{U22}
16	GK	MAS	Rajendran Veloo^{U22}
17	FW	MAS	Shahmeer Rusli^{U22}
18	MF	MAS	Akmal Hakim Rosli^{U22}

No.	Pos.	Nation	Player
19	FW	MAS	Aiman Afif
20	DF	MAS	Muhammad Ammar^{U22}
21	MF	MAS	Muhammad Danial Tarmizi
22	MF	MAS	Rahmat Makasuf
23	MF	MAS	Jasmir Mehat
25	GK	MAS	Norfahmi Zaki^{U22}
27	MF	MAS	Muhammad Idrzuwan Daud
28	MF	MAS	Aizat Najmie^{U22}
29	FW	MAS	Afeeq Iqmal
30	FW	MAS	Nabil Latpi
32	DF	MAS	Aqil Irfanuddin
49	MF	MAS	Zhafir Yusoff
80	DF	GUI	Barry Ibrahima

== Club officials ==
As of 28 August 2026

Position	Name
President	(Malaysia) Muhammad Sanusi Md Nor
Manager	(Malaysia) Baddrol Bakhtiar
Head coach	(Malaysia) Akmal Rizal
Assistant coach	(Malaysia) Mohamad Rizal Johari
Goalkeeper coach	(Malaysia) S. Ragesh
Assistant goalkeeper coach	(Malaysia) Helmi Eliza
Fitness coach	(Malaysia) Mohd Zulkifli Jaafar
Team doctor	(Malaysia) Mohd Fakhrulsani Abdul Hamid
Physiotherapy	(Malaysia) Muhammad Nur'Illya Samsudin
Team Admin	(Malaysia) Fiqkry Md Isa
Kitman	(Malaysia) Anizar Hussein (Malaysia) Taufiq Ahmad Mahar

== Head coaches ==
Coach	Years	Honours
(Malaysia) Victor Andrag	2025	
(Malaysia) Akmal Rizal	2026–	

== Season by season record ==
Season	Division	Position	Malaysia Cup	Malaysian FA Cup	MFL Challenge Cup	Regional	Top Scorer (All Competitions)
2025–26	Liga A1 Semi-Pro	3rd of 15	DNQ	DNQ	DNQ	–	(Malaysia) Aiman Afif (10)
2026–27	Liga A1 Semi-Pro	TBD	TBD	TBD	TBD	–	TBD

Champions	Runners-up	Third place	Promoted	Relegated

== Honours ==
=== Domestic ===
==== League ====
- Division 2/Malaysia A1 Semi-Pro League
  - Third place (1): 2025–26

==== Cups ====
None
