= Asnan Ahmad =

Malaysian footballer

Personal information
- Full name: Asnan bin Ahmad
- Date of birth: 3 May 1993 (age 33)
- Place of birth: Pendang, Malaysia
- Height: 1.72 m (5 ft 8 in)
- Position: Defensive midfielder

Team information
- Current team: Kedah FA
- Number: 4

Youth career
- 2011–2012: Kedah Darul Aman U21
- 2013: UKM

Senior career*
Years	Team	Apps	(Gls)
2013–2020	UKM		
2021	Terengganu		
2021–2022	Kedah Darul Aman	8	(0)
2023–2024	Penang	16	(0)
2024–2025	Sri Pahang		
2025–	Kedah FA		
- * Club domestic league appearances and goals as of 14 August 2025

Asnan bin Ahmad (born 3 May 1993) is a Malaysian professional footballer who plays as a defensive midfielder for Kedah FA.

== Career statistics ==
=== Club ===
As of 15 July 2022

Club	Season	League			Cup		League Cup		Continental		Total	
Club	Season	Division	Apps	Goals	Apps	Goals	Apps	Goals	Apps	Goals	Apps	Goals
Terengganu	2021	Malaysia Super League	1	0	0	0	0	0	0	0	1	0
Kedah Darul Aman	2021	Malaysia Super League	4	0	–		6	0	–		10	0
Kedah Darul Aman	2022	Malaysia Super League	4	0	1	0	0	0	2 (Note: Appearances in AFC Cup)	0	7	0
Total		8	0	1	0	6	0	2	0	17	0	
Career total			9	0	1	0	6	0	2	0	18	0
