= Nabil Latpi =

Malaysian association football player

Personal information
- Full name: Muhammad Nabil bin Ahmad Latpi
- Date of birth: 6 September 1992 (age 34)
- Place of birth: Pendang, Malaysia
- Height: 1.78 m (5 ft 10 in)
- Position: Winger

Team information
- Current team: Kedah FA
- Number: 30

Senior career*
Years	Team	Apps	(Gls)
2017–2018	PDRM	14	(1)
2019	Ultimate		
2019	Terengganu	8	(2)
2020	Kuala Lumpur		
2021–2024	PDRM	29	(7)
2024–2025	Penang	16	(0)
2025–	Kedah FA		
- * Club domestic league appearances and goals

Muhammad Nabil bin Ahmad Latpi (born 6 September 1992) is a Malaysian professional footballer who plays as a winger.
