= Zhafir Yusoff =

Malaysian footballer

Personal information
- Full name: Muhammad Zhafir bin Mohd Yusoff
- Date of birth: 30 April 1999 (age 27)
- Place of birth: Kedah, Malaysia
- Height: 1.69 m (5 ft 7 in)
- Position: Midfielder

Team information
- Current team: Kedah FA
- Number: 7

Youth career
- Malaysia Pahang Sports School
- Kedah Darul Aman

Senior career*
Years	Team	Apps	(Gls)
2019–2024	Kedah Darul Aman		
2024	Bukit Tambun		
2025–	Kedah		

International career^{‡}
2017–2018	Malaysia U19	1	(1)
- * Club domestic league appearances and goals as of 13 July 2019 ‡ National team caps and goals as of 13 July 2019

Muhammad Zhafir bin Mohd Yusoff (born 30 April 1999) is a Malaysian professional footballer who plays as a midfielder for Malaysia A1 Semi-Pro League club Kedah.
