= Afzal Akbar =

Malaysian professional footballer

Personal information
- Full name: Muhammad Afzal bin Akbar
- Date of birth: 2 November 1998 (age 28)
- Place of birth: Malaysia
- Height: 1.79 m (5 ft 10 in)
- Position: Midfielder

Team information
- Current team: Kedah FA
- Number: 11

Youth career
- Kuala Lumpur City U19
- Kuala Lumpur City U21

Senior career*
Years	Team	Apps	(Gls)
2022	UiTM FC	18	(1)
2023	Kelantan	13	(0)
2024–2025	Kelantan Darul Naim	13	(0)
2025–	Kedah FA	0	(0)
- * Club domestic league appearances and goals

Muhammad Afzal bin Akbar (born 2 November 1998) is a Malaysian professional footballer who plays as a midfielder.

== Early life and career ==
Afzal started his career with the Kuala Lumpur President and Youth Cup squad before continuing his studies at UiTM Shah Alam in the field of Sports Science.

== Senior career ==
=== Kelantan ===
On 25 February 2023, Afzal made his debut for the club in a 1–2 defeat against Kuching City.

== Style of play ==
Afzal can operate as a midfielder or left-back.

== Career statistics ==
=== Club ===
As of match played 25 February 2023

Appearances and goals by club, season and competition
Club	Season	League			Cup		League Cup		Continental		Total	
Club	Season	Division	Apps	Goals	Apps	Goals	Apps	Goals	Apps	Goals	Apps	Goals
UiTM FC	2022	Malaysia Premier League	18	1	1	0	2	0	–		21	1
UiTM FC	Total		18	1	1	0	2	0	–		21	1
Kelantan	2023	Malaysia Super League	1	0	0	0	0	0	–		1	0
Kelantan	Total		1	0	0	0	0	0	–		1	0
Career Total			0	0	0	0	0	0	–	–	0	0
