= Rezal Zambery =

Malaysian footballer

Personal information
- Full name: Rezal Zambery Yahya
- Date of birth: 10 October 1978 (age 48)
- Place of birth: Johor, Malaysia
- Position: Midfielder

Team information
- Current team: AAK-UNISEL (head coach)

Youth career
- Johor FA

Senior career*
Years	Team	Apps	(Gls)
1997–2000	Johor FA		
2001	Kelantan FA		
2002–2004	Johor FC		
2005–2010	Negeri Sembilan FA		
2011	Johor FC	25	(3)
2012–2014	ATM FA		
2015	NS Matrix F.C.		
2016	MOF F.C.		

International career
2005–2007	Malaysia	10	(0)

Managerial career
- 2021–2023: Kelantan (assistant coach)
- 2022–2023: Kelantan
- 2024–: Kelantan Darul Naim (assistant coach)
- * Club domestic league appearances and goals

Rezal Zambery Yahya (born 10 October 1978 in Batu Pahat, Johor) is a Malaysian former footballer who played as a midfielder. He is former head coach for Kelantan in Malaysia Premier League.

== Career ==
Rezal played in the Johor youth teams before making his senior debut in 1997. With Johor, he won Malaysia FA Cup in 1998 and Premier Two league title in 1999. He transferred to Kelantan FA in 2001, before coming back to Johor a year later to play with club side Johor FC.

He moved to Negeri Sembilan FA in 2005. In his 5 years with the team, he won Malaysia Cup in 2009 as well as runners-up in two occasions. Rezal signs with his former team Johor FC for one season in 2011, before switching to ATM FA in 2012, where he won 2012 Malaysia Premier League title with them. He returned to Negeri Sembilan in 2015.

== Managerial statistics ==
As of 30 April 2025

Managerial record by team and tenure
Team	Nat	From	To	Record							
Team	Nat	From	To	G	W	D	L	GF	GA	GD	Win %
Kelantan	(Malaysia)	19 November 2021	12 January 2023	23	12	5	6	30	25	+5	52.17
Kelantan (caretaker)	(Malaysia)	4 April 2023	8 April 2023	1	0	0	1	0	5	−5	0.00
Kelantan Darul Naim (caretaker)	(Malaysia)	25 January 2025	30 April 2025	7	0	0	7	4	39	−35	0.00
Career Total				31	12	5	14	34	69	−35	38.71
