= 2017 Johor Darul Ta'zim F.C. season =

Johor Darul Ta'zim
2017 season
- President: Tunku Tun Aminah Sultan Ibrahim
- Head Coach: Mario Gómez (until 18 January); Benjamín Mora (18 January to 18 June); Ulisses Morais (from 19 June)
- Stadium: Larkin Stadium
- Super League: 1st
- Charity Shield: Runners-up
- FA Cup: Quarter-finals
- Malaysia Cup: Winners
- Champions League play-off: Play-off round
- AFC Cup: Zonal semi-finals
- Top goalscorer: League: Gonzalo Cabrera (11); All: Gabriel Guerra (20)
- Highest home attendance: 24,157 vs Kedah (20 January 2017)
- Lowest home attendance: 9,850 vs Boeung Ket (21 February 2017)
- Average home league attendance: 17,051
- Biggest win: 7–0 vs Melaka United (H), 9 April 2017, Super League
- Biggest defeat: 0–3 vs Gamba Osaka (A), 7 February 2015, Champions League Play-off
Home colours	Away colours	Third colours

The 2017 season was Johor Darul Ta'zim F.C.'s 45th season in club history and their 5th season in the Malaysia Super League since rebranding from Johor FC. The season was notable as JDT won their first-ever Malaysia Cup title in the club's 44-year history.

== Season overview ==
The 2017 season was a successful one for Johor Darul Ta'zim, as the club won a fourth consecutive Malaysia Super League title and claimed their first-ever Malaysia Cup trophy, completing the league-and-cup double.

=== Super League ===
JDT began their Malaysia Super League campaign on 20 January and concluded it on 28 October, finishing as champions with 49 points from 22 matches, recording 15 wins, 4 draws, and 3 defeats, with 50 goals scored and 19 conceded for a goal difference of +31. The title was JDT's fourth consecutive Malaysia Super League crown, extending their record of dominance in Malaysian football. JDT finished nine points ahead of second-placed Pahang and ten ahead of third-placed Felda United.

=== FA Cup ===
In contrast to their league success, JDT's Malaysia FA Cup campaign ended in the quarter-finals. After entering in the second round, JDT progressed through the early stages with three wins and one draw from four matches, scoring 9 goals and conceding 4. However, their title defence was ended by Pahang, who defeated JDT 4–3 on aggregate in the quarter-finals, with Pahang winning the first leg 3–1 at the Darul Makmur Stadium in Kuantan. Pahang went on to win the competition, denying JDT a chance to retain the trophy they had won for the first time the previous year.

=== Malaysia Cup ===
The Malaysia Cup was where JDT finally completed their domestic trophy collection, winning the competition for the first time in the club's history. After topping Group D, which included a 3–1 win over Selangor at the Larkin Stadium sealed by a brace from Lebanese import Mohammed Ghaddar, JDT advanced to the knockout stages. They defeated Melaka United in the quarter-finals and Perak in the semi-finals to reach the final against defending champions Kedah. In the final, played on 4 November at the Shah Alam Stadium in front of 80,000 fans, JDT defeated Kedah 2–0, with goals from Aidil Zafuan and Gonzalo Cabrera, to claim their first-ever Malaysia Cup title and complete the league-and-cup double.

=== AFC Cup ===
JDT entered the AFC Cup as the reigning champions from their 2015 triumph, having also reached the semi-finals in 2016. However, their continental campaign ended in the quarter-finals, as they were unable to defend the trophy they had won two years earlier. Despite the early AFC Cup exit, JDT's domestic double of the league title and Malaysia Cup made 2017 one of the most successful seasons in the club's history.

== Friendly matches ==
Win Draw Loss

5 January 2017 Friendly	Johor Darul Ta'zim (Malaysia)	5–0	(Singapore) Geylang United	Johor Bahru, Malaysia
21:00	Brian Ferreira; Ahmad Hazwan Bakri; Azamuddin Akil; Muhammad Fazly Mazlan; Darren Lok			Stadium: Seri Gelam

10 January 2017 Friendly	Chonburi (Thailand)	1–1	(Malaysia) Johor Darul Ta'zim	Chon Buri, Thailand
17.00	Nurul Sriyankem 30'		Brian Ferreira 19' pen	Stadium: Chon Buri Stadium

11 January 2017 Friendly	Air Force United (Thailand)	1–0	(Malaysia) Johor Darul Ta'zim	Pathum Thani, Thailand
18.00	Diego Oliveira Silva 82'			Stadium: Thupatemi Stadium

14 January 2017 Friendly	Buriram United (Thailand)	1–0	(Malaysia) Johor Darul Ta'zim	Buriram, Thailand
19.00	Diogo Luís Santo 6'			Stadium: New I-Mobile Stadium

27 August 2017 Friendly	Johor Darul Ta'zim (Malaysia)	3–0	(Singapore) Warriors	Johor Bahru, Malaysia
21:00	Natxo Insa 31' 40'; Mohammed Ghaddar 52'			Stadium: Tan Sri Dato Haji Hassan Yunos Stadium

30 August 2017 Friendly	Hougang United (Singapore)	1–1	(Malaysia) Johor Darul Ta'zim	Singapore
20.00	Iqbal Hussain 30'		S. Chanturu 70' pen	Stadium: Hougang Stadium

7 October 2017 Friendly	Johor Darul Ta'zim (Malaysia)	3–1	(Singapore) Hougang United	Johor Bahru, Malaysia
16:00	Nicolás Fernández 68' 84'; Aidil Zafuan 72'		Iqbal Hussain 52'	Stadium: Tan Sri Dato Haji Hassan Yunos Stadium

== Competitions ==
=== Overview ===
Competition	First match	Last match	Starting round	Final position	Record							
Competition	First match	Last match	Starting round	Final position	Pld	W	D	L	GF	GA	GD	Win %
Malaysia Super League (Note: Includes the Charity Shield.)	20 January 2017	28 October 2017	Matchday 1	Winners	22	15	4	3	50	19	+31	68.18
Malaysia FA Cup	14 February 2017	23 April 2017	Second round	Quarter-finals	4	3	0	1	9	4	+5	75.00
Malaysia Cup	4 July 2017	4 November 2017	Group stage	Winners	11	7	3	1	27	7	+20	63.64
AFC Champions League	31 January 2017	7 February 2017	Preliminary round 2	Play-off round	2	0	1	1	1	4	−3	0.00
AFC Cup	21 February 2017	31 May 2017	Group stage	Zonal semi-finals	8	5	1	2	20	9	+11	62.50
Total					47	30	9	8	107	43	+64	63.83

Last updated: 4 November 2017
Source: Competitions

=== Liga Super ===
==== Table ====
Pos	Team	Pld	W	D	L	GF	GA	GD	Pts	Qualification or relegation
1	Johor Darul Ta'zim (C)	22	15	4	3	50	19	+31	49	Qualification to Champions League preliminary round 2 or AFC Cup group stage
2	Pahang (Note: Pahang withdraw from AFC competition.)	22	12	4	6	44	26	+18	40	
3	Felda United (Note: Felda United were relegated because they failed to renew their licence) (R)	22	11	6	5	40	26	+14	39	Relegation to Premier League
4	Kedah (Note: Kedah as 2017 Malaysia FA Cup winners not eligible for AFC competition spots as they failed granted AFC club license.)	22	9	8	5	45	33	+12	35	
5	Perak	22	9	7	6	30	31	−1	34	

Source: FAM, FMLLP
Rules for classification: 1) Points; 2) Goal difference; 3) Number of goals scored.
(C) Champions; (R) Relegated

==== Results summary ====
Overall								Home						Away					
Pld	W	D	L	GF	GA	GD	Pts	W	D	L	GF	GA	GD	W	D	L	GF	GA	GD
22	15	4	3	50	19	+31	49	9	2	0	29	7	+22	6	2	3	21	12	+9

Source: Liga Super fixtures and results

==== Liga Super fixtures and results ====
Win Draw Loss

20 January 2017 1 / Charity Shield	Johor Darul Ta'zim	1–1 (4–5 p)	Kedah	Johor Bahru, Johor
21:00 UTC+8	Brian Ferreira (yellow card) 26'; S. Kunanlan (yellow card) 28' (red card) 45+3'; Mohd Safiq Rahim 40' pen (yellow card) 68'; Ahmad Hazwan Bakri (substituted off) 43'; Jerónimo Barrales (substituted on) 43'; Azamuddin Akil (substituted off) 46'; Mohd Azrif Nasrulhaq (substituted on) 46'; Fadhli Shas (substituted off) 52'; Aidil Zafuan (substituted on) 52'; Marcos Antonio (yellow card) 65'		Mohd Asri Mardzuki (yellow card) 10' (substituted off) 64'; Sandro da Silva Mendonça (yellow card) 45+3' (substituted off) 65'; Baddrol Bakhtiar 63'; Mohd Fitri Omar (substituted on) 64'; Muhammad Farhan Roslan (substituted on) 65'; Mohd Syawal Nordin (substituted off) 73'; Khairul Helmi Johari (substituted on) 73'; Muhammad Akram Mahinan (yellow card) 80'	Stadium: Tan Sri Dato Haji Hassan Yunos Stadium; Attendance: 24,157; Referee: Suhaimi Mat Hassan
	Penalties
	J. Barrales (penalty scored); M. António (penalty scored); G. Cabrera (penalty scored); B. Ferreira (penalty missed); Safiq (penalty scored)		Farhan (penalty scored); Akram (penalty scored); Ken Ilsø (penalty scored); Baddrol (penalty scored); Krasniqi (penalty scored)

27 January 2017 2	Johor Darul Ta'zim	3–1	(Kuala Lumpur) Felda United	Johor Bahru, Johor
21:00 UTC+8	Fadhli Shas 27'; Jerónimo Barrales (substituted off) 57'; Safawi Rasid (substituted on) 57'; Gonzalo Cabrera 61'; Brian Ferreira 64' (yellow card) 66' (substituted off) 86'; Gonzalo Cabrera (substituted off) 80'; Mohd Afiq Fazail (substituted on) 80'; Ahmad Hazwan Bakri (substituted on) 86'; Mohd Amirul Hadi Zainal (yellow card) 89'		Norshahrul Idlan Talaha 22' (substituted off) 83'; Wan Zack Haikal (yellow card) 33' (substituted off) 48'; Fakrul Aiman Sidid (substituted on) 48'; Shukor Adan (yellow card) 50'; Hasni Zaidi Jamian (yellow card) 54' (red card) 59'; Gastón Cellerino (substituted off) 63'; Wan Amirul Afiq (substituted on) 63'; Fazrul Hazli Kadri (substituted on) 83'	Stadium: Tan Sri Dato Haji Hassan Yunos Stadium; Attendance: 18,320; Referee: Suhaizi Shukri

11 February 2017 3	Johor Darul Ta'zim	0–0	Selangor	Johor Bahru, Johor
21:00 UTC+8	Gabriel Guerra (substituted off) 73'; Safawi Rasid (substituted on) 73' (yellow card) 73'; Brian Ferreira (substituted off) 75'; Ahmad Hazwan Bakri (substituted on) 75'; Fadhli Shas (substituted off) 79'; Mohd Afiq Fazail (substituted on) 79'		Mohd Razman Roslan (yellow card) 37'; Victoraș Astafei (yellow card) 50' (substituted off) 90'; Ugo Ukah (yellow card) 60'; Juliano Mineiro (substituted off) 75'; Adam Nor Azlin (substituted on) 75' (yellow card) 90+2'; Saiful Ridzuwan Selamat (substituted off) 81'; Abdul Halim Zainal (substituted on) 81'; K. Satish (substituted on) 90'	Stadium: Tan Sri Dato Haji Hassan Yunos Stadium; Attendance: 19,822; Referee: Mohd Zohri Bin Tajuddin

18 February 2017 4	Perak	2–1	Johor Darul Ta'zim	Ipoh, Perak
21:00 UTC+8	Yashir Pinto 7'; Faton Toski (substituted off) 50'; Shahrul Saad (substituted on) 50'; Vladislav Mirchev 74'; Shahrom Kalam (yellow card) 79'; Zaquan Adha (substituted off) 90+3'; Muhammad Ridzuan Azly Hussham (substituted on) 90+3'		Ahmad Hazwan Bakri 9'; Azamuddin Akil (substituted off) 23'; Gonzalo Cabrera (substituted on) 23'; Brian Ferreira (substituted off) 58'; Mahali Jasuli (substituted on) 58'; Aidil Zafuan (substituted off) 80'; Mohd Afiq Fazail (substituted on) 80'	Stadium: Perak Stadium; Attendance: 22,382; Referee: Suhaizi Shukri

25 February 2017 5	Johor Darul Ta'zim	3–0	(Terengganu) T-Team	Johor Bahru, Johor
21:00 UTC+8	Gabriel Guerra 10' 30' 39' (substituted off) 69'; Ahmad Hazwan Bakri (substituted off) 67'; Hadi Fayyadh (substituted on) 67'; Mahali Jasuli (substituted on) 69'; Safiq Rahim (substituted off) 76'; Amirul Hadi Zainal (substituted on) 76'		Muhd Azalinullah Mohd Alias (substituted off) 64'; Ramzi Sufian (substituted on) 64'; Mohd Hasbullah Awang (yellow card) 70'; Abdoulaye Maïga (substituted off) 72'; Badrul Hisham Morris (substituted on) 72'; Farhod Tadjiyev (substituted off) 83'; Mohd Fakhrurazi Musa (substituted on) 83' (yellow card) 88'	Stadium: Tan Sri Dato Haji Hassan Yunos Stadium; Attendance: 14,810; Referee: Wan Mohamad Tarmizi Wan Ibrahim

28 February 2017 6	Sarawak	0–2	Johor Darul Ta'zim	Kuching, Sarawak
20:15 UTC+8	Rodney Celvin Akwensivie (yellow card) 15' (substituted off) 46'; Shreen Tambi (substituted on) 46'; Tommy Mawat Bada (substituted off) 71'; Hafiz Bakar (substituted on) 71'; Dzulazlan Ibrahim (yellow card) 73'; Shamie Iszuan (substituted off) 80'; Rahim Razak (substituted on) 80'		Gonzalo Cabrera 8' 70' (substituted off) 84'; Nazmi Faiz (substituted off) 55'; Mohd Amirul Hadi Zainal (substituted on) 55'; Gabriel Guerra (yellow card) 63'; Ahmad Hazwan Bakri (substituted off) 69'; Mahali Jasuli (substituted on) 69'; Aidil Zafuan (substituted on) 84'	Stadium: Sarawak State Stadium; Attendance: 6,153; Referee: S. Sittharanjanan

3 March 2017 7	Johor Darul Ta'zim	3–2	Pahang	Johor Bahru, Johor
21:00 UTC+8	Ahmad Hazwan Bakri 30' 36' (substituted off) 74'; Safiq Rahim 55' (yellow card) 66'; Nazmi Faiz (substituted off) 58'; Mohd Amirul Hadi Zainal (substituted on) 58'; Mohd Azrif Nasrulhaq (yellow card) 70' (substituted off); Mahali Jasuli (substituted on) 74'; Fazly Mazlan (substituted on) 81'		Matheus Alves 15' 67'; Mohd Afif Amiruddin (yellow card) 28'; Joseph Kalang Tie (substituted off) 60'; D. Christie Jayaseelan (substituted on) 60' (yellow card) 84'; Muhd Nor Azam Abdul Azih (substituted off) 69'; Kiko Insa (substituted on) 69'; Ashari Samsudin (substituted off) 81'; Bright Dike (substituted on) 81'	Stadium: Tan Sri Dato Haji Hassan Yunos Stadium; Attendance: 20,480; Referee: Zulkifli Ahmad

9 April 2017 8	Johor Darul Ta'zim	7–0	(Malacca) Melaka United	Johor Bahru, Johor
21:00 UTC+8	Gabriel Miguel Guerra 6'; Safiq Rahim 17' 58' 87' pen Mohd Amirul Hadi Zainal 22'; Ahmad Hazwan Bakri (substituted off) 28'; Azamuddin Akil (substituted on) 28'; Fazly Mazlan (yellow card) 30'; Gonzalo Cabrera 33' (substituted off) 62'; Azamuddin Akil 46'; Mohd Afiq Fazail (substituted off) 57'; Mohd Shakir Shaari (substituted on) 57'; R. Gopinathan (substituted on) 62'; Fadhli Shas (yellow card) 72'		Ahmad Khuzaimie Piee (yellow card) 15' (substituted off) 86'; R. Surendran (substituted off) 40'; Mohd Fauzi Roslan (substituted on) 40'; Ahmad Ezrie Shafizie (substituted off) 46'; Jasmir Mehat (substituted on) 46'; Sergio Ezequiel Agüero (yellow card) 62'; Muhd Nazri Ahmad (substituted on) 86'; Godwin Antwi (yellow card) 87'	Stadium: Tan Sri Dato Haji Hassan Yunos Stadium; Attendance: 14,475; Referee: Razlan Jeffri Ali

12 April 2017 9	Kelantan	2–3	Johor Darul Ta'zim	Kota Bharu, Kelantan
21:00 UTC+8	Mohammed Ghaddar 5' 15'; Mohd Khairul Izuan Rosli (substituted off) 59'; Hattaphon Bun An (substituted on) 59'; Morgaro Gomis (yellow card) 63'; Qayyum Marjoni (red card) 76'; Indra Putra Mahayuddin (yellow card) 82'; Mohd Badhri Mohd Radzi (substituted off) 84'; Fakhrul Zaman (substituted on) 84'		Safiq Rahim 19'; Gabriel Guerra 29' pen Gonzalo Cabrera 30'; Mohd Amirul Hadi Zainal (yellow card) 45'; S. Kunanlan (substituted off) 45+1'; Fazly Mazlan (substituted on) 45+1'; R. Gopinathan (substituted off) 54'; Azamuddin Akil (substituted on) 54'; Safiq Rahim (substituted off) 86'; Aidil Zafuan (substituted on) 86'	Stadium: Sultan Muhammad IV Stadium; Attendance: 13,891; Referee: Muhammad Nazmi Nasaruddin

15 April 2017 10	Johor Darul Ta'zim	2–1	(Selangor) PKNS	Johor Bahru, Johor
21:00 UTC+8	Matias Jadue 25' o.g. Mohd Azrif Nasrulhaq (yellow card) 49'; Safiq Rahim 55' pen Safawi Rasid (substituted off) 90+6'; Azamuddin Akil (substituted on) 90+6'; Gonzalo Cabrera (substituted off) 90+6'; Brian Ferreira (substituted on) 90+6'; Mohd Afiq Fazail (substituted off) 90+6'; Mohd Shakir Shaari (substituted on) 90+6'		S. Sivanesan (yellow card) 21' (substituted off) 90+6'; Bobby Gonzales 35' (substituted off) 90+6'; Nazrin Syamsul Bahri (yellow card) 45'; Matías Jadue (yellow card) 52'; Mohd Azmi Muslim (substituted on) 90+6'; Khyril Muhymeen Zambri (substituted on) 90+6'; Nor Haziq Aris (substituted off) 90+6'; Zamir Selamat (substituted on) 90+6'	Stadium: Tan Sri Dato Haji Hassan Yunos Stadium; Attendance: 13,325; Referee: Nagor Amir Noor Mohamed

26 April 2017 11	Penang	1–2	Johor Darul Ta'zim	Simpang Ampat, Penang
21:00 UTC+8	K. Reuben (substituted off) 28'; Mohd Redzuan Suhaidi (substituted on) 28'; Rafiuddin Rodin 40' (pen.); Faizat Ghazli (substituted off) 61'; Mohd Faiz Subri (substituted on) 61'; Syamer Kutty Abba (substituted off) 73'; Jafri Firdaus Chew (substituted on) 73'		Gonzalo Cabrera 5'; Azamuddin Akil 25' (substituted off) 51'; Marcos Antonio (yellow card) 42'; S. Chanturu (substituted on) 51'; Mohd Afiq Fazail (substituted off) 67'; Mohd Shakir Shaari (substituted on) 67'; Mohd Amirul Hadi Zainal (substituted off) 71'; Mahali Jasuli (substituted on) 71'	Stadium: Penang State Stadium; Attendance: 3,091; Referee: Mohd Amirul Izwan Yaakob

6 May 2017 12	Melaka United (Malacca)	1–1	Johor Darul Ta'zim	Krubong, Malacca
21:00 UTC+8	Ahmad Khuzaimi Piee (substituted off) 73'; Mohd Fauzi Roslan (substituted on) 73'; Khairu Azrin Khazali (substituted off) 83'; Ahmad Ezrie Shafizie (substituted on) 83'; Muhd Syawal Norsam (substituted off) 87'; Izzaq Faris Ramlan (substituted on) 87'; Jeon Woo-young 88' (yellow card) 89'; Sergio Agüero (yellow card) 90+2'		Mohd Amirul Hadi Zainal (substituted off) 25'; Safawi Rasid (substituted on) 25'; Gabriel Guerra (yellow card) 57'; Safiq Rahim 59' (yellow card) 90+3'; Dominic Tan (yellow card) 77'; Mohd Azrif Nasrulhaq (substituted off) 81'; S. Kunanlan (substituted on) 81'; Ahmad Hazwan Bakri (substituted off) 86'; S. Chanturu (substituted on) 86'	Stadium: Hang Jebat Stadium; Attendance: 11,037; Referee: Suhaimi Mat Hassan

24 May 2017 13	PKNS (Selangor)	0–1	Johor Darul Ta'zim	Shah Alam, Selangor
21:00 UTC+8	Mohd Fauzan Dzulkifli (yellow card) 44'; Alif Haikal Sabri (substituted off) 71'; K. Gurusamy (substituted on) 71'; Nizam Abu Bakar (yellow card) 73'; Lucas Espindola (substituted off) 82'; Khyril Muhymeen Zambri (substituted on) 82'; Abdul Ghani Rahman (substituted off) 87'; Khairul Ramadhan (substituted on) 87'; Matías Jadue (yellow card) 89'		S. Kunanlan (substituted off) 70'; Ahmad Hazwan Bakri (substituted on) 70'; Mohd Amirul Hadi Zainal 79'; Mohd Afiq Fazail (substituted off) 83'; Mohd Shakir Shaari (substituted on) 83'; Mohammed Ghaddar (substituted off) 87'; Mahali Jasuli (substituted on) 87'	Stadium: Shah Alam Stadium; Attendance: 3,754; Referee: Mohd Zohri Tajuddin

1 July 2017 14	Johor Darul Ta'zim	2–0	Penang	Johor Bahru, Johor
21:00 UTC+8	Mohammed Ghaddar 44' (substituted off) 85'; Mohd Amirul Hadi Zainal (substituted off) 63'; Mohd Afiq Fazail (substituted on) 63'; Muhammad Fazly Mazlan (substituted off) 63'; Mohd Azrif Nasrulhaq (substituted on) 63'; Gonzalo Cabrera (yellow card) 66' (goal) 83'; Ahmad Hazwan Bakri (substituted on) 85'		Mohd Azrul Ahmad (yellow card) 11' (substituted off) 61'; Azidan Sarudin (substituted on) 61'; Syamer Kutty Abba (substituted off) 67'; Faizat Ghazli (substituted on) 67'	Stadium: Tan Sri Dato Haji Hassan Yunos Stadium; Attendance: 16,850; Referee: Razlan Jeffri Ali

11 July 2017 15	Pahang	0–2	Johor Darul Ta'zim	Kuantan, Pahang
21:00 UTC+8	Wan Zaharulnizam Zakaria (substituted off) 79'; Nurridzuan Abu Hassan (substituted on) 79'; Ahmad Syamim Yahya (substituted off) 83'; Joseph Kalang Tie (substituted on) 83'; Heo Jae-Won (yellow card) 85'		Gonzalo Cabrera 2'; Mohd Amirul Hadi Zainal (yellow card) 36' (substituted off) 46'; Mohd Afiq Fazail (substituted on) 46'; Mohd Azrif Nasrulhaq (yellow card) 62' (substituted off) 74'; Mohammed Ghaddar (substituted off) 64'; Ahmad Hazwan Bakri (substituted on) 64'; Muhammad Fazly Mazlan (substituted on) 74' (yellow card) 77'; Natxo Insa 86'	Stadium: Darulmakmur Stadium; Attendance: 8,053; Referee: Razlan Jeffri Ali

15 July 2017 16	Johor Darul Ta'zim	3–1	Sarawak	Johor Bahru, Johor
21:00 UTC+8	Mohammed Ghaddar 11' 75'; Gonzalo Cabrera (substituted off) 56'; Safawi Rasid (substituted on) 56' (goal) 78'; Gabriel Guerra (substituted off) 65'; Azamuddin Akil (substituted on) 65'; Mohd Afiq Fazail (substituted off) 74'; Ahmad Hazwan Bakri (substituted on) 74'		Tommy Mawat Bada (substituted off) 45+2'; Rahim Razak (substituted on) 45+2'; Mazwandi Zekeria (yellow card) 62'; Sahil Suhaimi 64'; Alif Hassan (substituted off) 69'; Shahrol Saperi (substituted on) 69'; Shamie Iszuan (substituted off) 84'; Shreen Tambi (substituted on) 84'	Stadium: Tan Sri Dato Haji Hassan Yunos Stadium; Attendance: 10,126; Referee: Mohd Zohri Tajuddin

22 July 2017 17	T-Team (Terengganu)	1–6	Johor Darul Ta'zim	Kuala Terengganu, Terengganu
21:00 UTC+8	Mohd Fakhrurazi Musa (substituted off) 52'; Muhammad Fauzi Abdul Kadar (substituted on) 52'; Aqil Irfanuddin Mohd Sabri (substituted off) 72'; Mohd Syuhiran Zainal (substituted on) 72'; Yannick N'Djeng 84' pen Badrul Hisham Morris (substituted off) 86'; Ooi Shee Keong (substituted on) 86'		Gabriel Guerra 22' 59' (substituted off) 80'; Mohammed Ghaddar 41' (substituted off) 67'; S. Kunanlan 44'; Ahmad Hazwan Bakri (substituted on) 67'; Mohd Afiq Fazail (substituted off) 75'; Nazmi Faiz (substituted on) 75'; Fadhli Shas 77'; Darren Lok (substituted on) 80'; Gonzalo Cabrera 81'	Stadium: Sultan Ismail Nasiruddin Shah Stadium; Attendance: 1,084; Referee: Zulkarnain Zakaria

26 July 2017 18	Johor Darul Ta'zim	2–1	Perak	Johor Bahru, Johor
21:00 UTC+8	Mohd Afiq Fazail (substituted off) 46'; Ahmad Hazwan Bakri (substituted on) 46' (yellow card) 66'; Fadhli Shas 47'; Mohammed Ghaddar 60' (substituted off) 74'; Mohd Amirul Hadi Zainal (substituted on) 74'; Marcos Antonio Elias Santos (substituted off) 80'; Aidil Zafuan (substituted on) 80'		Yashir Pinto (yellow card) 16' (substituted off) 83'; Shahrom Kalam (yellow card) 37'; Mohd Hafiz Kamal 45+1' (yellow card) 52' (substituted off) 83'; D. Kenny Pallraj (substituted on) 83'; Abdul Hadi Yahya (substituted on) 83'; Mohd Nasir Basharuddin (substituted off) 83'; Zaquan Adha (substituted on) 83'	Stadium: Tan Sri Dato Haji Hassan Yunos Stadium; Attendance: 16,985; Referee: Suhaizi Shukri

5 August 2017 19	Selangor	2–1	Johor Darul Ta'zim	Selayang, Selangor
21:00 UTC+8	Ugo Ukah (yellow card) 26'; Mohd Amri Yahyah 59' (substituted off) 90+2'; Saiful Ridzuwan Selamat (substituted off) 71'; Andik Vermansyah (substituted on) 71' (goal) 79'; Abdul Halim Zainal (substituted on) 90+2'; Muhd Syahmi Safari (substituted off) 90+4'; Nurshamil Abd Ghani (substituted on) 90+4'		Mohd Afiq Fazail (yellow card) 34' (substituted off) 56'; Natxo Insa 39'; Junior Eldstal (substituted on) 56'; Mohammed Ghaddar (substituted off) 68'; Ahmad Hazwan Bakri (substituted on) 68'; Aidil Zafuan (substituted off) 80'; Nazmi Faiz (substituted on) 80' (yellow card) 81'	Stadium: Majlis Perbandaran Selayang Stadium; Attendance: 11,257; Referee: Khairul Azuan Kidam

20 September 2017 20	Johor Darul Ta'zim	3–0	Kelantan	Johor Bahru, Johor
21:00 UTC+8	S. Kunanlan 20'; Gonzalo Cabrera 37' (yellow card) 67'; Izham Tarmizi (substituted off) 46'; Haziq Nadzli (substituted on) 46'; Safiq Rahim 56'; Gabriel Guerra (substituted off) 65'; Safawi Rasid (substituted on) 65'; Fadhli Shas (substituted off) 70'; Aidil Zafuan (substituted on) 70'		Qayyum Marjoni (yellow card) 38'; S. Thinagaran (substituted off) 50'; Mohd Badhri Mohd Radzi (substituted on) 50'; Alessandro Celin (substituted off) 62'; Nor Farhan Muhammad (substituted on) 62'; Daudsu Jamaluddin (substituted off) 89'; Hattaphon Bun An (substituted on) 89'	Stadium: Tan Sri Dato Haji Hassan Yunos Stadium; Attendance: 18,210; Referee: Razlan Jeffri Ali

28 September 2017 21	Felda United (Kuala Lumpur)	3–2	Johor Darul Ta'zim	Shah Alam, Selangor
21:00 UTC+8	Thiago Augusto Fernandes 27' 64'; Ifedayo Olusegun 45'; Curran Singh Ferns (yellow card) 51'; Safwan Hashim (substituted off) 66'; Wan Amirul Afiq (substituted on) 66'; Ifedayo Olusegun (substituted off) 86'; Hadin Azman (substituted off) 86'; Wan Zack Haikal (substituted off) 90+5'; Danial Amier Norhisham (substituted on) 90+5'		Junior Eldstal (yellow card) 17' (goal) 38' (red card) 47'; Mohd Afiq Fazail (yellow card) 44'; Muhammad Fazly Mazlan (substituted off) 46'; Mohd Azrif Nasrulhaq (substituted on) 46'; Gonzalo Cabrera 57'; Mohammed Ghaddar (substituted off) 60'; Darren Lok (substituted on) 60'; S. Kunanlan (yellow card) 62'; Mohd Afiq Fazail (substituted off) 69'; Aidil Zafuan (substituted on) 69'	Stadium: Shah Alam Stadium; Attendance: 1,724; Referee: Suhaimi Mat Hassan

28 October 2017 22	Kedah	0–0	Johor Darul Ta'zim	Alor Setar, Kedah
21:00 UTC+8	Amirul Hisyam Awang Kechik (substituted off) 71'; Akmal Azmi (substituted on) 71'; Abdul Hadi Hamid (substituted off) 72'; Ifwat Akmal (substituted on) 72'; Liridon Krasniqi (substituted off) 77'; Osman Mohd Yusoff (substituted on) 77'		Gabriel Guerra (substituted off) 46'; Gonzalo Cabrera (substituted on) 46'; Darren Lok (substituted off) 62'; Mohammed Ghaddar (substituted on) 62'; Natxo Insa (substituted off) 77'; Safiq Rahim (substituted on) 77'; Gary Steven Robbat (yellow card) 82'	Stadium: Darulaman Stadium; Attendance: 3,000; Referee: Muhammad Rahmat Jantan

=== FA Cup ===
Win Draw Loss

14 February 2017 2nd Round	FELDA United (Kuala Lumpur)	0–2	Johor Darul Ta'zim	Jengka, Pahang
21:00 UTC+8	Gastón Cellerino (substituted off) 73'; Fazrul Hazli Kadri (substituted on) 73'; Shukor Adan (yellow card) 75'; Stuart Wark (substituted off) 83'; Fakrul Aiman Sidid (substituted on) 83'		Gabriel Guerra 13'; Marcos Antonio (yellow card) 29'; Ahmad Hazwan Bakri (substituted off) 63'; Gonzalo Cabrera (substituted on) 63' (goal) 80'; S. Kunanlan (yellow card) 66'; Nazmi Faiz (substituted off) 76'; Mohd Shakir Shaari (substituted on) 76'; Mohd Afiq Fazail (substituted off) 88'; Hasbullah Abu Bakar (substituted on) 88'	Stadium: Tun Abdul Razak Stadium; Attendance: 5,572; Referee: Zulkifli Bin Ahmad

11 March 2017 3rd Round	Johor Darul Ta'zim	4–0	(Selangor) UiTM	Larkin, Johor Bahru
21:00 UTC+8	Gonzalo Cabrera 20' 53' (substituted off) 73'; Ahmad Hazwan Bakri 22'; S. Kunanlan (substituted off) 26'; Fazly Mazlan (substituted on) 26'; Nazmi Faiz (substituted off) 65'; Mahali Jasuli (substituted on) 65'; Fadhli Shas 71' (yellow card) 85'; Azamuddin Akil (substituted on) 73'		Do Dong-hyun (yellow card) 27'; Muhd Khairul Akhyar Husain (substituted off) 30'; Muhd Shazlan Abu Samah (substituted on) 30'; Muhd Asnan Awal Hisham (substituted off) 43'; Sadam Hashim (substituted on) 43' Muhd Izman Solehin Rohadi (yellow card) 56'; Onorionde Kughegbe (yellow card) 57'; Faiz Mohd Bandong (substituted off) 70'; Megat Ahmad Zakwan (substituted on) 70'	Stadium: Tan Sri Dato Haji Hassan Yunos Stadium; Attendance: 12,752; Referee: Zulkarnain Zakaria

1 April 2017 Quarter-final 1	Pahang	3–1	Johor Darul Ta'zim	Kuantan, Pahang
21:00 UTC+8	Ahmad Syamim Yahya 14' (yellow card) 45+3'; Matheus Alves 49'; Ashari Samsudin (substituted off) 60'; Bright Dike (substituted on) 60' (goal) 66'; Muhd Nor Azam Abdul Azih (substituted off) 74'; Salamon Raj (substituted on) 74'		Marcos Antonio 22'; Brian Ferreira (yellow card) 33' (substituted off) 65'; Mohd Amirul Hadi Zainal (substituted on) 65'; Gonzalo Cabrera (yellow card) 83'; Ahmad Hazwan Bakri (substituted off) 84'; Mahali Jasuli (substituted on) 84'; Mohd Afiq Fazail (yellow card) 88' (substituted off) 90'; Safawi Rasid (substituted on) 90'	Stadium: Darul Makmur Stadium; Attendance: 29,100; Referee: Suhaimi Mat Hassan

23 April 2017 Quarter-final 2	Johor Darul Ta'zim	2–1 (3–4 agg.)	Pahang	Larkin, Johor Bahru
21:00 UTC+8	Gonzalo Cabrera 5'; Gabriel Guerra 23'; S. Kunanlan (substituted off) 64'; Azamuddin Akil (substituted on) 64'; Safiq Rahim (substituted off) 78'; Nazmi Faiz (substituted on) 78'		Mohd Afif Amiruddin (yellow card) 27'; Heo Jae-won (yellow card) 53'; Joseph Kalang Tie (substituted off) 67'; Ashari Samsudin (substituted on) 67'; Wan Zaharulnizam Zakaria (substituted off) 71'; D. Christie Jayaseelan (substituted on) 71'; Ahmad Syamim Yahya (substituted off) 83'; Nurridzuan Abu Hassan (substituted on) 83'; Mohamadou Sumareh 87'; Matheus Alves (yellow card) 90+8'	Stadium: Tan Sri Dato Haji Hassan Yunos Stadium; Attendance: 23,420; Referee: Zulkifli Ahmad

=== Malaysia Cup ===
Win Draw Loss

4 July 2017 Matchday 1	Johor Darul Ta'zim	4–0	Sarawak	Johor Bahru, Johor
21:00 UTC+8	Marcos Antonio 11'; Gabriel Guerra 26' pen 72'; Gonzalo Cabrera (substituted off) 62'; Azamuddin Akil (substituted on) 62'; Safiq Rahim (substituted off) 68'; Nazmi Faiz (substituted on) 68'; Ahmad Hazwan Bakri (substituted off) 76'; Mohammed Ghaddar (substituted on) 76'; Natxo Insa 83'		Kamaruddin Bohan (yellow card) 57' (substituted off) 68'; Alif Hassan (substituted on) 68'; Hairol Mokhtar (substituted off) 76'; Shreen Tambi (substituted off) 76'; Sahil Suhaimi (substituted off) 76'; Shamie Iszuan (substituted on) 76'	Stadium: Tan Sri Dato' Haji Hassan Yunos Stadium; Attendance: 13,285; Referee: Mohd Zohri Tajuddin

7 July 2017 Matchday 2	Terengganu	0–0	Johor Darul Ta'zim	Kuala Terengganu, Terengganu
21:00 UTC+8	J. Partiban (substituted off) 69'; Mohd Ridzuan Abdunloh (substituted on) 69'; Issey Nakajima-Farran (substituted off) 84'; Ferris Danial (substituted on) 84'		Junior Eldstål (yellow card) 42'; Mohd Shakir Shaari (substituted off) 46'; Mohd Azrif Nasrulhaq (substituted on) 46'; Darren Lok (substituted off) 63'; Ahmad Hazwan Bakri (substituted on) 63'; Azamuddin Akil (substituted off) 82'; S. Chanturu (substituted on) 82'	Stadium: Sultan Ismail Nasiruddin Shah Stadium; Attendance: 5,355; Referee: Mohd Fairuzi Mat Desa

18 July 2017 Matchday 3	Selangor	3–2	Johor Darul Ta'zim	Selayang, Selangor
21:00 UTC+8	Fairuz Abdul Aziz 32' (substituted off) 72'; Mohd Amri Yahyah 34' 90' pen Rizal Fahmi Rosid (substituted on) 72'; Abdul Halim Zainal (substituted off) 82'; Saiful Ridzuwan Selamat (substituted on) 82'; Andik Vermansyah (substituted off) 90+2'; Mohd Fitri Shazwan Raduwan (substituted on) 90+2'		Nazmi Faiz (yellow card) 42' (substituted off) 65'; Safawi Rasid (substituted off) 45'; Gonzalo Cabrera (substituted on) 45'; S. Chanturu (substituted off) 45'; Gabriel Guerra (substituted on) 45'; Ahmad Hazwan Bakri 55'; Darren Lok (substituted on) 65' (goal) 70'; Aidil Zafuan (yellow card) 89'; Marcos Antonio (yellow card) 90'	Stadium: Selayang Stadium; Attendance: 10,219; Referee: Mohd Zohri Tajuddin

29 July 2017 Matchday 4	Sarawak	0–2	Johor Darul Ta'zim	Kuching, Sarawak
21:00 UTC+8	Hafis Saperi (substituted off) 53'; Mateo Roskam (substituted on) 53'; Rahim Razak (substituted off) 61'; Shamie Iszuan (substituted on) 61'; Sahil Suhaimi (substituted off) 78'; Nor Azizi Ramlee (substituted on) 78'		Mohammed Ghaddar 41' (substituted off) 71'; Mohd Amirul Hadi Zainal (substituted off) 56'; Azamuddin Akil (substituted on) 56'; Gary Steven Robbat (substituted on) 71'; Safiq Rahim 76' (substituted off) 81'; Nazmi Faiz (substituted on) 81'; Fazly Mazlan (yellow card) 85'	Stadium: Sarawak Stadium; Attendance: 1,102; Referee: Fitri Maskon

1 August 2017 Matchday 5	Johor Darul Ta'zim	5–0	Terengganu	Johor Bahru, Johor
21:00 UTC+8	Safawi Rasid 18' pen (substituted off) 63'; Fadhli Shas 38'; S. Kunanlan 45'; Ahmad Hazwan Bakri 48'; Gabriel Guerra (substituted on) 63'; Mohd Amirul Hadi Zainal (substituted off) 63'; Natxo Insa (substituted on) 63'; Azamuddin Akil (substituted off) 75'; Darren Lok (substituted on) 75' (goal) 79'		Ferris Danial (yellow card) 19'; Hazeman Abdul Karim (substituted off) 46'; Faiz Nasir (substituted on) 46'; Adam Othman Arfah (substituted off) 52'; Adib Aizuddin Abdul Latif (substituted on) 52'; Hafizal Mohamad (substituted off) 56'; Nasrullah Haniff Johan (substituted on) 56'	Stadium: Tan Sri Dato' Haji Hassan Yunos Stadium; Attendance: 12,370; Referee: Mohd Zohri Tajuddin

9 September 2017 Matchday 6	Johor Darul Ta'zim	3–1	Selangor	Johor Bahru, Johor
21:00 UTC+8	Mohammed Ghaddar 16' 75' (substituted off) 80'; Hasbullah Abu Bakar (yellow card) 25' (substituted off) 45+3'; Fazly Mazlan (substituted on) 45+3'; Gary Steven Robbat 29' (yellow card) 61'; Nazmi Faiz (substituted off) 56'; Safiq Rahim (substituted on) 56'; Safawi Rasid (substituted on) 80'		Rufino Segovia 27'; Ugo Ukah (yellow card) 32'; Mohd Amri Yahyah (yellow card) 59'; Muhd Syahmi Safari (substituted off) 80'; S. Veenod (substituted on) 80'; Andik Vermansyah (substituted off) 83'; Muhd Faizzudin Abidin (substituted on) 83'	Stadium: Tan Sri Dato' Haji Hassan Yunos Stadium; Attendance: 15,930; Referee: Mohd Zohri Tajuddin

==== Group D ====
Pos	Team	Pld	W	D	L	GF	GA	GD	Pts	Qualification	JDT	SGR	SWK	TRG
1	Johor Darul Ta'zim	6	4	1	1	16	4	+12	13	Advance to knockout phase	—	3–1	4–0	5–0
2	Selangor	6	3	1	2	11	11	0	10	Advance to knockout phase	3–2	—	1–2	1–1
3	Sarawak	6	1	2	3	6	12	−6	5		0–2	1–2	—	0–0
4	Terengganu	6	0	4	2	6	12	−6	4		0–0	2–3	3–3	—

Updated to match(es) played on 9 September 2017. Source: FAM FMLLP

==== Bracket ====
Quarter-finals
B2	(Pahang) FELDA United	1	4	5
A1	(Perak) PKNP	3	1	4
D2	Selangor	2	0	2
C1	Kedah	3	1	4
A2	Pahang	3	0	3
B1	Perak	1	4	5
C2	(Malacca) Melaka United	1	1	2
D1	Johor Darul Ta'zim	4	1	5

Semi-finals
(Pahang) FELDA United	1	0	1
Kedah	1	2	3
Perak	1	0	1
Johor Darul Ta'zim	1	3	4

Final
Kedah	0
Johor Darul Ta'zim	2

15 September 2017 Quarter-final 1st leg	Melaka United (Malacca)	1–4	Johor Darul Ta'zim	Krubong, Malacca
21:00 UTC+8	Marco Simic 45+1' (substituted off) 83'; Jasmin Mecinović (yellow card) 76'; Mohd Fauzi Roslan (substituted off) 82'; Jasmir Mehat (substituted on) 82'; Izzaq Faris Ramlan (substituted on) 83'; S. Sivanesan (substituted off) 90+1'; Ahmad Ezrie Shafizie (substituted on) 90+1'		Mohammed Ghaddar 7' 34' (substituted off) 58'; Ahmad Hazwan Bakri (substituted on) 58'; Natxo Insa 68'; Gonzalo Cabrera (substituted off) 80'; Safawi Rasid (substituted on) 80'; Safiq Rahim 85'	Stadium: Hang Jebat Stadium; Attendance: 14,336; Referee: Khairul Azuan Kidam

24 September 2017 Quarter-final 2nd leg	Johor Darul Ta'zim	1–1 (5–2 agg.)	(Malacca) Melaka United	Johor Bahru, Johor
21:00 UTC+8	Nazmi Faiz 20'; Safawi Rasid (substituted off) 59'; Gabriel Guerra (substituted on) 59'; Ahmad Hazwan Bakri (substituted off) 68'; Gonzalo Cabrera (substituted on) 68'; Darren Lok (substituted off) 79'; Azamuddin Akil (substituted on) 79'		Mohd Azinee Taib (substituted off) 36'; Jasmir Mehat (substituted on) 36'; Felipe Souza 44' pen Mohd Fazli Paat (substituted off) 51'; Badrulzaman Abdul Halim (substituted on) 51'; Ahmad Ezrie Shafizie (substituted off) 81'; Norhakim Isa (substituted on) 81'	Stadium: Tan Sri Dato' Haji Hassan Yunos Stadium; Attendance: 10,230; Referee: Zulkarnain Zakaria

14 October 2017 Semi-final 1st leg	Perak	1–1	Johor Darul Ta'zim	Ipoh, Perak
21:00 UTC+8	Hasbullah Abu Bakar 17' o.g. Shahrul Saad (yellow card) 59'		S. Kunanlan (yellow card) 15'; Hasbullah Abu Bakar (substituted off) 46'; Muhammad Fazly Mazlan (substituted on) 46'; Gary Steven Robbat (substituted off) 61'; Mohd Afiq Fazail (substituted on) 61' (yellow card) 83'; Mohammed Ghaddar 68'; Gonzalo Cabrera (substituted off) 81'; Safawi Rasid (substituted on) 81'	Stadium: Perak Stadium; Attendance: 28,000; Referee: Razlan Jeffri Ali

21 October 2017 Semi-final 2nd leg	Johor Darul Ta'zim	3–0 (4–1 agg.)	Perak	Johor Bahru, Johor
21:00 UTC+8	Gonzalo Cabrera 57' 80'; Junior Eldstal (yellow card) 59'; Muhammad Fazly Mazlan (yellow card) 66'; Mohammed Ghaddar (substituted off) 71'; Darren Lok (substituted on) 71'; Gabriel Guerra 74'; Natxo Insa (yellow card) 79'; S. Kunanlan (substituted off) 84'; Mohd Azrif Nasrulhaq (substituted on) 84'; Mohd Afiq Fazail (substituted off) 87'; Nazmi Faiz (substituted on) 87'		D. Kenny Pallraj (yellow card) 26' (substituted off) 76'; Thiago Junior Aquino (yellow card) 65'; Zaquan Adha (substituted off) 72'; Mohd Nizad Ayub (substituted on) 72'; Abdul Hadi Yahya (substituted on) 76'	Stadium: Tan Sri Dato' Haji Hassan Yunos Stadium; Attendance: 21,140; Referee: Mohd Zohri Tajuddin

4 November 2017 Final	Kedah	0–2	Johor Darul Ta'zim	Shah Alam, Selangor
21:00 UTC+8	Baddrol Bakhtiar (substituted off) 78'; Muhammad Farhan Roslan (substituted on) 78'; Syazwan Zainon (substituted off) 81'; Mohd Fitri Omar (substituted on) 81' (yellow card) 90+2'; Sandro Da Silva (substituted off) 82'; Akram Mahinan (substituted on) 82'; Ken Ilsø (yellow card) 90+3'		Aidil Zafuan 3' (substituted off) 60'; S. Kunanlan (yellow card) 14'; Gabriel Guerra (yellow card) 31'; Gary Steven Robbat (substituted off) 56'; Mohd Afiq Fazail (substituted on) 56' (yellow card) 64'; Junior Eldstal (substituted on) 60'; Gonzalo Cabrera 62'; Muhammad Fazly Mazlan (substituted off) 84'; Mohd Azrif Nasrulhaq (substituted on) 84'	Stadium: Shah Alam Stadium; Attendance: 79,740; Referee: Razlan Joffri Ali; Man of the Match: Gonzalo Cabrera (Argentina)

=== AFC Champions League ===
Win Draw Loss

==== Qualifying play-off ====
31 January 2017 Preliminary round 2	Bangkok United (Thailand)	1–1 (a.e.t.) (4–5 p)	(Malaysia) Johor Darul Ta'zim	Pathum Thani, Thailand
19:00 UTC+7	Ernesto Amantegui (substituted off) 74'; Jaycee John Okwunwanne (substituted on) 74' (yellow card) 78' (goal) 120+1'; Mika Chunuonsee (yellow card) 94'; Pokklaw Anan (substituted off) 104'; Sumanya Purisai (substituted on) 104'; Putthinan Wannasri (substituted off) 110'; Teeratep Winothai (substituted on) 110'		Fadhli Shas (yellow card) 39'; Brian Ferreira (substituted off) 61'; Ahmad Hazwan Bakri (substituted on) 61'; Safawi Rasid (substituted off) 78'; Nazmi Faiz (substituted on) 78'; Farizal Marlias (yellow card) 82'; Gonzalo Cabrera (substituted off) 103'; Jeronimo Barrales (substituted on) 103' (red card) 112'; Safiq Rahim 108'; S. Kunanlan (yellow card) 110'	Stadium: Thammasat Stadium; Attendance: 4,502; Referee: Wang Di (China)
	Penalties
	Winothai (penalty scored); Bošković (penalty missed); Gjurovski (penalty scored); Macena (penalty scored); Okwunwanne (penalty scored); Ampaipitakwong (penalty missed)		Safiq (penalty scored); António (penalty missed); Fadhli (penalty scored); Amirul (penalty scored); Hazwan (penalty scored); Nazmi (penalty scored)

7 February 2017 Play-off round	Gamba Osaka (Japan)	3–0	(Malaysia) Johor Darul Ta'zim	Suita, Japan
19:00 UTC+9	Ademilson Junior 26' (substituted off) 88'; Shun Nagasawa 29'; Genta Miura 70'; Yasuhito Endō (yellow card) 75' (substituted off) 81'; Jin Izumisawa (substituted on) 81'; Ritsu Doan (substituted on) 88'		Fazly Mazlan (yellow card) 21'; Azamuddin Akil (substituted off) 55'; Mahali Jasuli (substituted on) 55'; Safawi Rasid (yellow card) 65' (substituted off) 66'; Nazmi Faiz (substituted on) 66'; Brian Ferreira (yellow card) 75'	Stadium: Suita City Football Stadium; Attendance: 8,149; Referee: Turki Mohammed A Alkhudhayr (Saudi Arabia)

=== AFC Cup ===
==== Group F ====
Pos	Team	Pld	W	D	L	GF	GA	GD	Pts	Qualification	GLO	JDT	BKA	MAG
1	(Philippines) Global Cebu	6	5	0	1	13	9	+4	15	Zonal semi-finals	—	3–2	3–1	1−0
2	(Malaysia) Johor Darul Ta'zim	6	4	1	1	16	5	+11	13	Zonal semi-finals	4–0	—	3–0	3–1
3	(Cambodia) Boeung Ket Angkor	6	1	1	4	3	12	−9	4		0–2	0–3	—	1–0
4	(Myanmar) Magwe	6	0	2	4	5	11	−6	2		2–4	1–1	1–1	—

Source: AFC
Rules for classification: Group stage tiebreakers

Win Draw Loss

==== Group stage ====
21 February 2017 Matchday 1	Johor Darul Ta'zim (Malaysia)	3–0	(Cambodia) Boeung Ket Angkor	Johor Bahru, Malaysia
20:45 UTC+8	Gabriel Guerra 3' (substituted off) 63'; Nazmi Faiz 11'; Gonzalo Cabrera (substituted on) 63'; S. Kunanlan (substituted off) 68'; Hasbullah Abu Bakar (substituted on) 68'; Mahali Jasuli (substituted off) 86'; S. Chanturu (substituted on) 86'; Safiq Rahim 89'		Maycon Calijuri (substituted off) 61'; Chhun Sothearath (substituted on) 61'; Seth Rozib (substituted off) 72'; Touch Pancharong (substituted on) 72'	Stadium: Tan Sri Dato Haji Hassan Yunos Stadium; Attendance: 9,850; Referee: Hasan Akrami (Iran); Man of the Match: Safiq Rahim (Malaysia)

7 March 2017 Matchday 2	Magwe (Myanmar)	1–1	(Malaysia) Johor Darul Ta'zim	Yangon, Myanmar
15:30 UTC+6:30	Kyaw Zin Lwin (substituted off) 24'; Win Moe Kyaw (substituted on) 24'; Set Phyo Wai (substituted off) 66'; Hein Zar Aung (substituted on) 66'; Htoo Htoo Aung (substituted off) 80'; Aung Kyaw Htwe (substituted on) 80'; Sylla Sekou 89'		Hasbullah Abu Bakar (red card) 13'; R. Gopinathan 28' (yellow card) 47' (substituted off) 60'; S. Chanturu (substituted off) 46'; Mahali Jasuli (substituted on) 46'; Safiq Rahim (substituted on) 60'; Safawi Rasid (substituted off) 81' (yellow card) 81'; Gabriel Guerra (substituted on) 81'	Stadium: Thuwunna Stadium; Attendance: 350; Referee: Hussein Abo Yehia (Lebanon); Man of the Match: Sylla Sekou (Guinea)

14 March 2017 Matchday 3	Johor Darul Ta'zim (Malaysia)	4–0	(Philippines) Global	Johor Bahru, Malaysia
20:45 UTC+8	Mahali Jasuli 30'; Safiq Rahim 33' pen (substituted off) 90'; Fazly Mazlan (yellow card) 56'; Brian Ferreira (substituted on) 60' (goal) 87'; Ahmad Hazwan Bakri (substituted off) 76'; S. Chanturu (substituted on) 76'; Mohd Amirul Hadi Zainal (yellow card) 88'; Nazmi Faiz (substituted on) 90'; Marcos Antonio 90+2'		Germaine Agustien (substituted off) 40'; Misagh Bahadoran (substituted on) 40'; Darryl Roberts (substituted off) 62'; Mario Clarino (substituted on) 62'; Paul Mulders (substituted off) 84'; Paolo Salenga (substituted on) 84'	Stadium: Tan Sri Dato Haji Hassan Yunos Stadium; Attendance: 11,090; Referee: Kim Dae-Young (South Korea); Man of the Match: Safiq Rahim (Malaysia)

5 April 2017 Matchday 4	Global (Philippines)	3–2	(Malaysia) Johor Darul Ta'zim	Manila, Philippines
19:30 UTC+8	Dennis Villanueva 27' (yellow card) 39'; Shu Sasaki 32'; Amani Aguinaldo 35'; Kemy Agustien (yellow card) 43' (substituted off) 78'; Paul Mulders (substituted off) 62'; Mario Clarino (substituted on) 62'; Paolo Salenga (substituted on) 78'		Marcos Antonio Elias Santos (yellow card) 39'; Gabriel Guerra 49' 83'; Azamuddin Akil (substituted off) 64'; Safiq Rahim (substituted on) 64'; Nazmi Faiz (substituted off) 72'; Brian Ferreira (substituted on) 72'; Mohd Amirul Hadi Zainal (yellow card) 79'; Ahmad Hazwan Bakri (substituted off) 84'; S. Chanturu (substituted on) 84' (yellow card) 87'	Stadium: Rizal Memorial Stadium; Attendance: 458; Referee: Khamis Mohamed K A Al-Kuwari (Qatar); Man of the Match: Paul Mulders (Philippines)

19 April 2017 Matchday 5	Boeung Ket Angkor (Cambodia)	0–3	(Malaysia) Johor Darul Ta'zim	Kampong Cham, Cambodia
19:30 UTC+8	Sun Sovannarith (yellow card) 45'; Ly Mizan (substituted off) 62'; Math Yamoin (substituted on) 62' (yellow card) 77'; Maycon Calijuri (substituted off) 70'; Ly Vahed (substituted on) 70'; Chhun Sothearath (substituted off) 78'; Sok Pheng (substituted on) 78'		Safawi Rasid 8' (yellow card) 75' (substituted off) 80'; Nazmi Faiz 26'; Azamuddin Akil (substituted off) 47'; S. Chanturu (substituted on) 47'; Mahali Jasuli (yellow card) 55'; Dominic Tan (substituted off) 70'; Fadhli Shas (substituted on) 70' (yellow card) 89'; Gabriel Guerra (substituted on) 80' (goal) 90+2'	Stadium: Olympic Stadium; Attendance: 1,277; Referee: Ammar Mahfoodh (Bahrain); Man of the Match: Nazmi Faiz (Malaysia)

3 May 2017 Matchday 6	Johor Darul Ta'zim (Malaysia)	3–1	(Myanmar) Magwe	Johor Bahru, Malaysia
20:45 UTC+8	Gabriel Guerra 16' 59' 79' pen R. Gopinathan (substituted off) 54'; Ahmad Hazwan Bakri (substituted on) 54'; Azamuddin Akil (substituted off) 67'; S. Chanturu (substituted on) 67'; Aidil Zafuan (substituted off) 85'; Dominic Tan (substituted on) 85'		Kyaw Swar Linn 3'; Cho Tun (yellow card) 44'; Swan Htet Aung (substituted off) 57'; Set Phyo Wai (substituted on) 57'; Aung Soe Moe (substituted off) 84'; Thant Zin Win (substituted on) 84'; Nanda Kyaw (substituted off) 90'; Win Moe Kyaw (substituted on) 90'	Stadium: Tan Sri Dato Haji Hassan Yunos Stadium; Attendance: 10,190; Referee: Yudai Yamamoto (Japan); Man of the Match: Gabriel Guerra (Argentina)

==== Zonal Semi-finals ====
17 May 2017 ASEAN Semi-final 1st leg	Johor Darul Ta'zim (Malaysia)	3–2	(Philippines) Ceres-Negros	Johor Bahru, Malaysia
20:45 UTC+8	Dominic Tan (yellow card) 8' (substituted off) 56'; Gonzalo Cabrera 18'; S. Kunanlan (yellow card) 35' (substituted off) 69'; Safiq Rahim 44'; Mohd Azrif Nasrulhaq (yellow card) 45+1'; Mohd Amirul Hadi Zainal (substituted on) 56'; Ahmad Hazwan Bakri 67'; Safawi Rasid (substituted on) 69'; Mohd Afiq Fazail (substituted off) 81'; Mohd Shakir Shaari (substituted on) 81'; Farizal Marlias (yellow card) 87'		Fernando Rodríguez 21'; Bienvenido Marañón 24'; OJ Porteria (substituted off) 67'; Jason De Jong (substituted on) 67' (yellow card) 73'; Kota Kawase (substituted off) 80'; Luke Woodland (substituted on) 80'	Stadium: Tan Sri Dato Haji Hassan Yunos Stadium; Attendance: 14,220; Referee: Rowan Arumughan (India); Man of the Match: Ahmad Hazwan Bakri (Malaysia)

31 May 2017 ASEAN Semi-final 2nd leg	Ceres-Negros (Philippines)	2–1 (4–4 agg.)	(Malaysia) Johor Darul Ta'zim	Bacolod, Philippines
15:30 UTC+6:30	Kota Kawase 26'; Bienvenido Marañón (substituted off) 78'; Carli de Murga (substituted on) 78'; Fernando Rodríguez 90+3'; Kevin Ingreso (substituted off) 90+5'; Luke Woodland (substituted on) 90+5'; Manuel Herrera (yellow card) 90+7'		Marcos Antonio (yellow card) 43'; Mahali Jasuli (substituted off) 46'; Ahmad Hazwan Bakri (substituted on) 46' (yellow card) 82'; Mohd Afiq Fazail (substituted off) 63'; Safawi Rasid (substituted on) 63' (yellow card) 90+8'; Gabriel Miguel Guerra 65' (yellow card) 65'; Gonzalo Cabrera (substituted off) 88'; Mohd Shakir Shaari (substituted on) 88'; Mohd Farizal Marlias (red card) 90+5'	Stadium: Panaad Park and Stadium; Attendance: 5,687; Referee: Fu Ming (China); Man of the Match: Fernando Rodríguez (Spain)

== Club statistics ==
=== Appearances ===
Correct as of match played on 4 November 2017

No.	Pos.	Name	Liga Super	FA Cup	Malaysia Cup	Asia (Note: AFC Cup, including AFC Champions League Qualifying play-off matches)	Total
1	GK	(Malaysia) Farizal Marlias	8	0	0	5	13
2	MF	(Malaysia) Azamuddin Akil	5 (4)	0 (2)	3 (2)	5	13 (8)
3	DF	(Malaysia) Hasbullah Abu Bakar	1	0 (1)	3	1 (1)	5 (2)
4	MF	(Malaysia) Afiq Fazail	12 (5)	4	6 (2)	4	26 (7)
5	MF	(Malaysia) Amirul Hadi Zainal	13 (4)	2 (1)	7	6 (1)	28 (6)
6	DF	(Brazil) Marcos António	18	4	2	8	32
7	DF	(Malaysia) Aidil Zafuan	7 (5)	0	5	5	17 (5)
8	MF	(Malaysia) Safiq Rahim	20 (1)	4	6 (1)	7 (2)	37 (4)
9	FW	(Malaysia) Hazwan Bakri	7 (9)	3	5 (2)	4 (3)	14 (14)
10	FW	(Argentina) Gabriel Guerra	20	4	7 (3)	6 (2)	37 (5)
12	MF	(Malaysia) S. Kunanlan	17 (1)	3	9	6	35 (1)
13	MF	(Malaysia) Gary Steven Robbat	2	0	3 (1)	0	5 (1)
15	DF	(Malaysia) Fazly Mazlan	15 (3)	4 (1)	5 (2)	9	33 (6)
16	MF	(Malaysia) Shakir Shaari	2 (4)	0 (1)	1	2 (2)	5 (7)
17	MF	(Malaysia) R. Gopinathan	1 (1)	0	0	3	4 (1)
18	DF	(Malaysia) Mahali Jasuli	1 (6)	1 (2)	0	4 (2)	6 (10)
20	DF	(Malaysia) Azrif Nasrulhaq	12 (3)	3	4 (3)	5	24 (6)
21	MF	(Malaysia) Nazmi Faiz	3 (2)	2 (1)	5 (3)	4 (3)	14 (9)
22	FW	(Lebanon) Mohammed Ghaddar	9 (1)	0	5 (1)	0	14 (2)
23	MF	(Malaysia) S. Chanturu	0 (2)	0	1 (1)	1 (5)	2 (8)
24	GK	(Malaysia) Izham Tarmizi	13	4	7	3	27
25	MF	(Malaysia) Junior Eldstål	5 (1)	0	7 (1)	1	13 (2)
26	DF	(Malaysia) Dominic Tan	1	0	0	2 (1)	3 (1)
27	DF	(Malaysia) Fadhli Shas	13 (1)	3	8	2 (1)	26 (2)
28	FW	(Malaysia) Jordan Ollerenshaw	1 (2)	0	2 (3)	0	3 (5)
29	FW	(Malaysia) Safawi Rasid	2 (5)	1	4 (3)	2 (2)	9 (10)
30	GK	(Malaysia) Haziq Nadzli	1 (1)	0	4	2	7 (1)
50	MF	(Malaysia) Munim Tajuddin	9	0	8 (1)	0	17 (1)
Players who left the club in mid transfer window or on loan
10	FW	(Iraq) Brian Ferreira	4 (3)	1	0	3 (2)	8 (5)
19	FW	(Argentina) Jerónimo Barrales	1 (1)	0	0	0 (1)	1 (2)

=== Top scorers ===
Rnk	Pos	No.	Player	Liga Super	FA Cup	Malaysia Cup	Asia	Total
1	FW	10	(Argentina) Gabriel Guerra	7	2	3	8	20
2	MF	11	(Malaysia) (United States) Wan Kuzri Wan Kamal	11	4	3	1	19
3	MF	8	(Malaysia) Safiq Rahim	9	0	2	4	15
4	FW	22	(Lebanon) Mohammed Ghaddar	5	0	6	0	11
5	FW	9	(Malaysia) Ahmad Hazwan Bakri	3	1	2	1	7
6	DF	27	(Malaysia) Fadhli Shas	3	1	1	0	5
7	MF	50	(Malaysia) Natxo Insa	2	0	2	0	4
8	MF	12	(Malaysia) S. Kunanlan	2	0	1	0	3
9	MF	29	(Malaysia) Safawi Rasid	1	0	1	1	3
10	DF	6	(Brazil) Marcos Antonio	0	1	1	1	3
11	MF	21	(Malaysia) Nazmi Faiz	0	0	1	2	3
12	MF	2	(Malaysia) Azamuddin Akil	2	0	0	0	2
13	MF	5	(Malaysia) Amirul Hadi Zainal	2	0	0	0	2
14	MF	10	(Iraq) Brian Ferreira	1	0	0	1	2
15	FW	28	(Malaysia) Jordan Ollerenshaw	0	0	2	0	2
16	DF	25	(Malaysia) Junior Eldstal	1	0	0	0	1
17	MF	17	(Malaysia) R. Gopinathan	0	0	0	1	1
18	DF	18	(Malaysia) Mahali Jasuli	0	0	0	1	1
19	MF	13	(Malaysia) Gary Steven Robbat	0	0	1	0	1
20	DF	7	(Malaysia) Aidil Zafuan	0	0	1	0	1
Own goals				1	0	0	0	1
TOTALS				50	9	27	21	107

=== Hat-tricks ===
Player	Competition	Against	Result	Date
(Argentina) Gabriel Guerra	Liga Super	T-Team	3–0	25th Feb 2017
(Malaysia) Safiq Rahim	Liga Super	Melaka United	7–0	9th Apr 2017
(Argentina) Gabriel Guerra	AFC Cup	Magwe FC	3–1	3 May 2017

=== Top assists ===
Rnk	Pos	No.	Player	Liga Super	FA Cup	Malaysia Cup	Asia	Total
1	MF	8	(Malaysia) Safiq Rahim	12	2	2	4	20
2	FW	10	(Argentina) Gabriel Guerra	9	1	2	2	14
3	MF	11	(Malaysia) (United States) Wan Kuzri Wan Kamal	3	0	2	1	6
4	MF	12	(Malaysia) S. Kunanlan	2	0	0	3	5
5	FW	9	(Malaysia) Ahmad Hazwan Bakri	0	2	3	0	5
6	MF	2	(Malaysia) Azamuddin Akil	3	0	0	0	3
7	DF	20	(Malaysia) Mohd Azrif Nasrulhaq	2	1	0	0	3
8	MF	29	(Malaysia) Safawi Rasid	1	0	2	0	3
9	MF	50	(Malaysia) Natxo Insa	1	0	2	0	3
10	MF	4	(Malaysia) Mohd Afiq Fazail	1	0	2	0	3
11	DF	15	(Malaysia) Fazly Mazlan	0	0	2	1	3
12	FW	22	(Lebanon) Mohammed Ghaddar	2	0	0	0	2
13	MF	21	(Malaysia) Nazmi Faiz	1	0	0	1	2
14	DF	7	(Malaysia) Aidil Zafuan	1	0	0	0	1
15	DF	18	(Malaysia) Mahali Jasuli	0	1	0	0	1
16	FW	19	(Argentina) Jerónimo Barrales	0	0	0	1	1
17	DF	6	(Brazil) Marcos Antonio	0	0	1	0	1
18	FW	28	(Malaysia) Jordan Ollerenshaw	0	0	1	0	1
TOTALS				38	7	17	15	77

=== Clean sheets ===
Rnk	No.	Player	Liga Super	FA Cup	Malaysia Cup	Asia	Total
1	1	(Malaysia) Mohd Izham Tarmizi	5	2	5	2	14
2	30	(Malaysia) Haziq Nadzli	1	0	2	1	4
3	24	(Malaysia) Mohd Farizal Marlias	3	0	0	0	3
TOTALS			9	2	7	3	21

=== Discipline ===
==== Cards ====
Rnk	No.	Player	Total			Liga Super			FA Cup			Malaysia Cup			Asia		
Rnk	No.	Player	Yellow card	(yellow card) (red card)	Red card	Yellow card	(yellow card) (red card)	Red card	Yellow card	(yellow card) (red card)	Red card	Yellow card	(yellow card) (red card)	Red card	Yellow card	(yellow card) (red card)	Red card
1	12	(Malaysia) S. Kunanlan	7	1	0	3	1	0	1	0	0	1	0	0	2	0	0
2	15	(Malaysia) Fazly Mazlan	7	0	0	3	0	0	0	0	0	2	0	0	2	0	0
3	6	(Brazil) Marcos António	6	0	0	2	0	0	1	0	0	1	0	0	2	0	0
4	4	(Malaysia) Mohd Afiq Fazail	5	0	0	3	0	0	1	0	0	1	0	0	0	0	0
4	5	(Malaysia) Mohd Amirul Hadi Zainal	5	0	0	3	0	0	0	0	0	0	0	0	2	0	0
4	29	(Malaysia) Safawi Rasid	5	0	0	1	0	0	0	0	0	0	0	0	4	0	0
5	20	(Malaysia) Mohd Azrif Nasrulhaq	4	0	0	3	0	0	0	0	0	0	0	0	1	0	0
5	10	(Iraq) Brian Ferreira	4	0	0	2	0	0	1	0	0	0	0	0	1	0	0
5	10	(Argentina) Gabriel Guerra	4	0	0	2	0	0	0	0	0	1	0	0	1	0	0
5	27	(Malaysia) Fadhli Shas	4	0	0	1	0	0	1	0	0	0	0	0	2	0	0
6	25	(Malaysia) Junior Eldstal	3	1	0	1	1	0	0	0	0	2	0	0	0	0	0
7	8	(Malaysia) Safiq Rahim	3	0	0	3	0	0	0	0	0	0	0	0	0	0	0
7	11	(Malaysia) (United States) Wan Kuzri Wan Kamal	3	0	0	2	0	0	1	0	0	0	0	0	0	0	0
8	1	(Malaysia) Farizal Marlias	2	0	1	0	0	0	0	0	0	0	0	0	2	0	1
9	21	(Malaysia) Nazmi Faiz	2	0	0	1	0	0	0	0	0	1	0	0	0	0	0
9	26	(Malaysia) Dominic Tan	2	0	0	1	0	0	0	0	0	0	0	0	1	0	0
9	9	(Malaysia) Ahmad Hazwan Bakri	2	0	0	1	0	0	0	0	0	0	0	0	1	0	0
9	13	(Malaysia) Gary Steven Robbat	2	0	0	0	0	0	0	0	0	2	0	0	0	0	0
10	3	(Malaysia) Hasbullah Abu Bakar	1	0	1	0	0	0	0	0	0	1	0	0	0	0	1
11	19	(Argentina) Jeronimo Barrales	0	0	1	0	0	0	0	0	0	0	0	0	0	0	1
12	17	(Malaysia) R. Gopinathan	1	0	0	0	0	0	0	0	0	0	0	0	1	0	0
12	23	(Malaysia) S. Chanturu	1	0	0	0	0	0	0	0	0	0	0	0	1	0	0
12	18	(Malaysia) Mahali Jasuli	1	0	0	0	0	0	0	0	0	0	0	0	1	0	0
12	7	(Malaysia) Aidil Zafuan	1	0	0	0	0	0	0	0	0	1	0	0	0	0	0
12	50	(Malaysia) Natxo Insa	1	0	0	0	0	0	0	0	0	1	0	0	0	0	0
Totals			76	2	3	32	2	0	6	0	0	14	0	0	24	0	3

== Transfers and contracts ==
=== In ===
No.	Pos.	Name	Age	Moving from	Type	Transfer Date	Transfer fee	Notes	Ref.
1	MF	(Malaysia) Nazmi Faiz	22	Selangor	Transfer	16 November 2016	Undisclosed	—	
2	GK	(Malaysia) Haziq Nadzli	18	(Kuala Lumpur) PDRM	Transfer	1 December 2016	Undisclosed	—	
3	MF	(Malaysia) Syahrul Azwari	23	Sarawak	Transfer	1 December 2016	Undisclosed	—	
4	FW	(Malaysia) Ahmad Hazwan Bakri	25	Selangor	Transfer	12 December 2016	RM 750,000	—	
5	FW	(Iraq) Brian Ferreira	22	(Argentina) Independiente	Transfer	23 December 2016	Undisclosed	—	
6	MF	(Malaysia) R. Gopinathan	27	Selangor	Transfer	27 December 2016	Undisclosed	—	
7	MF	(Malaysia) (United States) Wan Kuzri Wan Kamal	14	(United States) Saint Louis	Transfer	6 January 2017	Undisclosed	—	
8	FW	(Argentina) Jerónimo Barrales	24	(Turkey) Sivasspor	Transfer	7 January 2017	Undisclosed	—	
9	FW	(Lebanon) Mohammed Ghaddar	32	Kelantan	Transfer	20 May 2017	Undisclosed	—	
10	MF	(Malaysia) (Spain) Natxo Insa	30	(Spain) Levante	Transfer	6 June 2017	€400,000	—	

=== Out ===
No.	Pos.	Name	Age	Moving to	Type	Transfer fee	Notes
1	MF	(Malaysia) Nazrin Nawi	28	Perak	Transfer	RM 750,000	
2	MF	(Malaysia) Jasazrin Jamaluddin	30	Perak	Transfer	RM 750,000	
3	FW	(Malaysia) Mohd Amri Yahyah	35	(Malacca) Melaka United	End of contract	Released	
4	FW	(Malaysia) Mohd Safee Sali	32	Selangor PKNS FC	Transfer	Undisclosed	
5	DF	(Malaysia) Asraruddin Putra Omar	28	Penang	End of Contract	Released	
6	FW	(Argentina) Jorge Pereyra Díaz	26	(Mexico) Club León	Transfer	RM 14,000,000	
7	FW	(Argentina) Juan Martín Lucero	25	(Mexico) Club Tijuana	Transfer	RM 11,500,000	
8	FW	(Argentina) Jerónimo Barrales	29	Johor Darul Ta'zim II	Feeder Club		
9	MF	(Singapore) Hariss Harun	26	(Spain) CE L'Hospitalet	Loan		
10	MF	(Singapore) Hariss Harun	26	(Singapore) Home United	Loan		
11	FW	(Iraq) Brian Ferreira	22	(Ecuador) Fuerza Amarilla	Transfer	Undisclosed	

=== Contracts ===
No.	Player	Status	Contract length	Expiry date	Other notes	Ref.

== Home attendance ==
All matches will be played at Larkin Stadium.

Date	Attendance	Opposition	Score	Competition	Ref
20 January 2017	24,157	Kedah FA	1–1 p (4–5)	Liga Super Match Day 1 Charity Shield	
27 January 2017	18,320	Felda United FC	3–1	Liga Super Match Day 2	
11 February 2017	19,822	Selangor FA	0–0	Liga Super Match Day 4	
21 February 2017	9,850	Boeung Ket Angkor FC	3–0	AFC Cup Group Stage Match Day 1	
25 February 2017	14,807	T-Team FC	3–0	Liga Super Match Day 6	
3 March 2017	20,480	Pahang FA	3–2	Liga Super Match Day 8	
11 March 2017	12,755	UiTM FC	4–0	Malaysia FA Cup 3rd round	
14 March 2017	11,090	Global FC	4–0	AFC Cup Group Stage Match Day 3	
9 April 2017	14,475	Melaka United FC	7–0	Liga Super Match Day 9	
15 April 2017	13,325	PKNS FC	2–1	Liga Super Match Day 10	
23 April 2017	23,420	Pahang FA	2–1	Malaysia FA Cup Q-Final 2nd Leg	
3 May 2017	10,190	Magwe FC	3–1	AFC Cup Group Stage Match Day 6	
17 May 2017	14,220	Ceres Negros FC	3–2	AFC Cup ASEAN Zonal Semi-finals	
1 July 2017	16,850	Penang FA	2–0	Liga Super Match Day 14	
4 July 2017	13,285	Sarawak FA	4–0	Malaysia Cup Group Match 1	
15 July 2017	10,126	Sarawak FA	3–1	Liga Super Match Day 16	
26 July 2017	16,985	Perak TBG FC	2–1	Liga Super Match Day 18	
1 August 2017	12,370	Terengganu FA	5–0	Malaysia Cup Group Match Day 5	
9 September 2017	15,930	Selangor FA	3–1	Malaysia Cup Group Match Day 6	
20 September 2017	18,210	Kelantan FA	3–0	Liga Super Match Day 20	
24 September 2017	10,230	Melaka United FC	1–1	Malaysia Cup Q-Final 2nd leg	
21 October 2017	21,140	Perak TBG FC	3–0	Malaysia Cup S-Final 2nd leg	

=== Attendance (Each Competitions) ===
Competition(s)	Match(s)	Total Attendance	Average Attendance per Match
Liga Super	11	187,557	17,051
Malaysia FA Cup	2	36,172	18,086
Malaysia Cup	5	72,955	14,591
AFC Cup	4	45,410	11,353
Total & Average Attendance (Overall)	22	342,092	15,550

== See also ==
- 2013 Johor Darul Takzim F.C. season
- 2014 Johor Darul Ta'zim F.C. season
- 2015 Johor Darul Ta'zim F.C. season
- 2016 Johor Darul Ta'zim F.C. season
- Johor Darul Ta'zim II F.C.
- Johor Darul Ta'zim III F.C.
