= 2017 Felda United F.C. season =

FELDA United
2017 season
- President: Hanapi Suhada
- Manager: Jamaludin Ahmad
- Head Coach: Azmi Mohamed (until 10 February 2017); Mohd Nik (caretaker) (until 20 February 2017); B. Sathianathan (from 21 February 2017)
- Stadium: Tun Abdul Razak Stadium (Capacity: 25,000)
- Liga Super: 3rd
- Piala FA: Round of 32
- Piala Malaysia: Semi-finals
- AFC Cup: Group stage
- Top goalscorer: League: Thiago Augusto (14); All: Thiago Augusto (18)
- Highest home attendance: 18,500 vs Pahang (1 July 2017)
- Lowest home attendance: 200 vs Hà Nội (7 March 2017)
- Average home league attendance: 2,854
Home colours	Away colours	Third colours

The 2017 season was Felda United's 11th competitive season and 7th consecutive season in the top flight of Malaysian football, Liga Super.

== Foreign players ==
Note: Flags indicate national team as defined under FIFA eligibility rules; some limited exceptions apply. Players may hold more than one non-FIFA nationality.

No.	Pos.	Nation	Player
5	DF	AUS	Dino Djulbic
10	MF	LBR	Zah Rahan Krangar (Vice-captain)
14	FW	NGR	Ifedayo Olusegun
23	FW	BRA	Thiago Augusto Fernandes

== Competitions ==
=== Overview ===
Competition	Record								Started round	Current position / round	Final position / round	First match	Last match
Competition	P	W	D	L	GF	GA	GD	Win %	Started round	Current position / round	Final position / round	First match	Last match
Liga Super	22	11	6	5	40	26	+14	50.00	—	3rd	3rd	21 January	28 October
Piala FA	1	0	0	1	0	2	−2	0.00	Round of 32	Round of 32	Round of 32	14 February	14 February
Piala Malaysia	10	4	3	3	17	14	+3	40.00	Group stage	Semi-finals	Semi-finals	4 July	21 October
AFC Cup	6	1	2	3	7	10	−3	16.67	Group stage	Group stage	Group stage	21 February	3 May
Total	39	16	11	12	64	54	+10	41.03					

Updated to match played 29 October 2017
Source: Competitions

== Results and fixtures ==
=== Liga Super ===
Win Draw Loss

21 January 2017 1	FELDA United (Kuala Lumpur)	1−0	(Selangor) PKNS	Jengka, Pahang
21:00 UTC+8	Norshahrul 67'	Report		Stadium: Tun Abdul Razak Stadium; Attendance: 2,277; Referee: Zamzaidi Katimin

27 January 2017 2	Johor Darul Ta'zim	3−1	(Kuala Lumpur) FELDA United	Johor Bahru, Johor
21:00 UTC+8	Fadhli Shas 27'; Cabrera 62'; Ferreira 65'	Report	Norshahrul 23'	Stadium: Tan Sri Dato Haji Hassan Yunos Stadium; Attendance: 18,320; Referee: Suhaizi Shukri

4 February 2017 3	FELDA United (Kuala Lumpur)	1−1	Kedah	Jengka, Pahang
21:00 UTC+8	Hadin 58'	Report	Ilsø 24'	Stadium: Tun Abdul Razak Stadium; Attendance: 6,211; Referee: Fitri Maskon

11 February 2017 4	FELDA United (Kuala Lumpur)	1−2	Kelantan	Jengka, Pahang
21:00 UTC+8	Zah Rahan 45+2'	Report	Indra Putra 34'; Ghaddar 90'	Stadium: Tun Abdul Razak Stadium; Attendance: 10,393; Referee: Zamzaidi Katimin

17 February 2017 5	Selangor	3−1	(Kuala Lumpur) FELDA United	Selayang, Selangor
21:00 UTC+8	Astafei 29'; Raimi 43'; Mineiro 45+1'	Report	Cano 84'	Stadium: MP Selayang Stadium; Attendance: 1,819; Referee: Muhd Nazmi Nasaruddin

25 February 2017 6	FELDA United (Kuala Lumpur)	2−2	Perak TBG	Jengka, Pahang
21:00 UTC+8	Norshahrul 67'; Cano 68'	Report	Hafiz 13'; Zaquan 51'	Stadium: Tun Abdul Razak Stadium; Attendance: 2,992; Referee: Mohd Zohri Tajuddin

1 March 2017 7	T-Team (Terengganu)	0−0	(Kuala Lumpur) FELDA United	Kuala Terengganu, Terengganu
21:00 UTC+8		Report		Stadium: Sultan Ismail Nasiruddin Shah Stadium; Attendance: 1,079+ Referee: Suresh Jayaraman

4 March 2017 8	FELDA United (Kuala Lumpur)	2−0	Sarawak	Jengka, Pahang
21:00 UTC+8	Cano 53'; Hadin 70'	Report		Stadium: Tun Abdul Razak Stadium; Attendance: 1,552; Referee: Zamzaidi Katimin

8 April 2017 9	FELDA United (Kuala Lumpur)	0−1	Penang	Jengka, Pahang
21:00 UTC+8		Report	S. Kumaahran 78'	Stadium: Tun Abdul Razak Stadium; Attendance: 1,130; Referee: Nagor Amir Noor Mohamed

15 April 2017 10	Melaka United (Malacca)	1−1	(Kuala Lumpur) FELDA United	Krubong, Malacca
21:00 UTC+8	Jones 82'	Report	Cano 90+2'	Stadium: Hang Jebat Stadium; Attendance: 2,711; Referee: Mohd Amirul Izwan Yaacob

26 April 2017 11	Pahang	1−1	(Kuala Lumpur) FELDA United	Kuantan, Pahang
21:00 UTC+8	Alves 19'		Wark 24'	Stadium: Darul Makmur Stadium; Referee: Muhd Nazmi Nasaruddin

7 May 2017 12	Penang	1−2	(Kuala Lumpur) FELDA United	George Town, Penang
21:00 UTC+8	Dabinyaba 54'	Report	Cano 17'; Norshahrul 89'	Stadium: City Stadium; Attendance: 1,393; Referee: Mohd Fairuzi Mat Desa

24 May 2017 13	FELDA United (Kuala Lumpur)	3−0	(Malacca) Melaka United	Jengka, Pahang
21:00 UTC+8	Cano 29'; Krangar 33'; Cellerino 85' (pen.)	Report		Stadium: Tun Abdul Razak Stadium; Attendance: 1,367; Referee: Muhd Rahmat Jantan

1 July 2017 14	FELDA United (Kuala Lumpur)	2−1	Pahang	Jengka, Pahang
21:00 UTC+8	Olusegun 5'; Thiago Augusto 88'	Report	Sumareh 1'	Stadium: Tun Abdul Razak Stadium; Attendance: 1,367; Referee: Zamzaidi Katimin

11 July 2017 15	Sarawak	1−3	(Kuala Lumpur) FELDA United	Kuching, Sarawak
20:15 UTC+8	Alif 70'	Report	Thiago Augusto 10', 35', 55'	Stadium: Sarawak State Stadium; Attendance: 1,497; Referee: Muhd Rahmat Jantan

15 July 2017 16	FELDA United (Kuala Lumpur)	5−1	(Terengganu) T-Team	Jengka, Pahang
21:00 UTC+8	Wan Zack 24'; Thiago Augusto 47', 59', 79'; Olusegun 89'	Report	N'Djeng 42'	Stadium: Tun Abdul Razak Stadium; Attendance: 1,288; Referee: Suhaizi Shukri

22 July 2017 17	Perak TBG	1−0	(Kuala Lumpur) FELDA United	Shah Alam, Selangor
21:00 UTC+8	Pinto 12' (pen.)	Report		Stadium: Shah Alam Stadium; Attendance: 2,678; Referee: Mohd Zohri Tajuddin

26 July 2017 18	FELDA United (Kuala Lumpur)	3−1	Selangor	Jengka, Pahang
21:00 UTC+8	Thiago Augusto 40'; Olusegun 44'; Shukor 76'	Report	Doe 45+2'	Stadium: Tun Abdul Razak Stadium; Attendance: 2,469; Referee: Zulkarnain Zakaria

5 August 2017 19	Kelantan	1−1	(Kuala Lumpur) FELDA United	Kota Bharu, Kelantan
21:00 UTC+8	Celin 26'	Report	Olusegun 25'	Stadium: Sultan Muhammad IV Stadium; Attendance: 1,061; Referee: Fitri Maskon

20 September 2017 20	Kedah	1−1	(Kuala Lumpur) FELDA United	Alor Setar, Kedah
21:00 UTC+8	Ilsø 21'	Report	Wan Zack 2', 49'; Thiago Augusto 19'	Stadium: Darul Aman Stadium; Attendance: 4,000; Referee: Wan Mohamad Tarmizi

28 September 2017 21	FELDA United (Kuala Lumpur)	3−2	Johor Darul Ta'zim	Shah Alam, Selangor
21:00 UTC+8	Thiago Augusto 27', 64'; Olusegun 45+1'	Report	Eldstål 39'; Cabrera 57'	Stadium: Shah Alam Stadium; Attendance: 1,724; Referee: Suhaimi Mat Hassan

28 October 2017 22	PKNS (Selangor)	2−4	(Kuala Lumpur) FELDA United	Shah Alam, Selangor
21:00 UTC+8	Shahrul 23'; Jammeh 90'	Report	Thiago Augusto 50', 73', 90+3'; Zah Rahan 90+1'	Stadium: Shah Alam Stadium; Attendance: 75; Referee: Suhaimi Mat Hassan

Source: Fixtures / Result

==== League table ====
Pos	Team	Pld	W	D	L	GF	GA	GD	Pts	Qualification or relegation
1	Johor Darul Ta'zim (C)	22	15	4	3	50	19	+31	49	Qualification to Champions League preliminary round 2 or AFC Cup group stage
2	Pahang (Note: Pahang withdraw from AFC competition.)	22	12	4	6	44	26	+18	40	
3	Felda United (Note: Felda United were relegated because they failed to renew their licence) (R)	22	11	6	5	40	26	+14	39	Relegation to Premier League
4	Kedah (Note: Kedah as 2017 Malaysia FA Cup winners not eligible for AFC competition spots as they failed granted AFC club license.)	22	9	8	5	45	33	+12	35	
5	Perak	22	9	7	6	30	31	−1	34	

Source: FAM, FMLLP
Rules for classification: 1) Points; 2) Goal difference; 3) Number of goals scored.
(C) Champions; (R) Relegated

=== Piala FA ===
Win Draw Loss

14 February 2017 Round of 32	FELDA United (Kuala Lumpur)	0−2	Johor Darul Ta'zim	Jengka, Pahang
21:00 UTC+8		Report	Guerra 12'; Cabrera 79'	Stadium: Tun Abdul Razak Stadium; Attendance: 5,572; Referee: Zulkifli Ahmad

=== Piala Malaysia ===
==== Group stage ====
Pos	Team	Pld	W	D	L	GF	GA	GD	Pts	Qualification	PRK	FLDU	KUL	PKNS
1	Perak	6	5	1	0	13	3	+10	16	Advance to knockout phase	—	2–1	2–0	2–0
2	(Pahang) FELDA United	6	3	2	1	11	7	+4	11	Advance to knockout phase	1–1	—	0–0	3–2
3	Kuala Lumpur	6	1	2	3	3	9	−6	5		0–3	1–4	—	2–0
4	(Selangor) PKNS	6	0	1	5	4	12	−8	1		1–3	1–2	0–0	—

Updated to match(es) played on 9 September 2017. Source: FAM FMLLP

Win Draw Loss

4 July 2017 1	FELDA United (Kuala Lumpur)	0−0	Kuala Lumpur	Jengka, Pahang
21:00 UTC+8		Report		Stadium: Tun Abdul Razak Stadium; Attendance: 990; Referee: Mohd Nafeez Abdul Wahab

8 July 2017 2	PKNS (Selangor)	1−2	(Kuala Lumpur) FELDA United	Shah Alam, Selangor
21:00 UTC+8	Wleh 60'	Report	Zah Rahan 5'; Thiago Augusto 88'	Stadium: Shah Alam Stadium; Attendance: 210; Referee: Suhaimi Mat Hassan

18 July 2017 3	FELDA United (Kuala Lumpur)	1−1	Perak	Jengka, Pahang
21:00 UTC+8	Zah Rahan 67'	Report	Shahrul 66'	Stadium: Tun Abdul Razak Stadium; Attendance: 1,320; Referee: Suhaimi Mat Hassan

29 July 2017 4	Kuala Lumpur	1−4	(Kuala Lumpur) FELDA United	Shah Alam, Selangor
21:00 UTC+8	Guilherme de Paula Lucrécio 90+1'	Report	Thiago Augusto 27', 49', 52'; Olusegun 56'	Stadium: Selayang Stadium; Attendance: 459; Referee: Khairul Azuan Kidam

1 August 2017 5	FELDA United (Kuala Lumpur)	3−2	(Selangor) PKNS	Jengka, Pahang
21:00 UTC+8	Olusegun 46', 75'; Shukor 73'	Report	Bobby 31'; Nazrin 61' (pen.)	Stadium: Tun Abdul Razak Stadium; Attendance: 1,129; Referee: Mohd Nafeez Abdul Wahab

9 September 2017 6	Perak	2−1	(Kuala Lumpur) FELDA United	Ipoh, Perak
21:00 UTC+8	Nizad 25'; Shahrul 80'	Report	Amier 52'	Stadium: Perak Stadium; Attendance: 3,720; Referee: Razlan Jeffri Ali

==== Quarter-finals ====
15 September 2017 First Leg	FELDA United (Kuala Lumpur)	1−3	(Perak) PKNP	Jengka, Pahang
21:00 UTC+8	Hadin 77'	Report	Shahrel 11', 45', 68'	Stadium: Tun Abdul Razak Stadium; Attendance: 1,549; Referee: Suhaimi Mat Hassan

24 September 2017 Second Leg	PKNP (Perak)	1−4 (4−5 agg.)	(Kuala Lumpur) FELDA United	Tanjung Malim, Perak
21:00 UTC+8	Kim Hyun-woo 8'	Report	Wan Zack 35', 45'; Olusegun 37'; Zah Rahan 49'	Stadium: Proton City Stadium; Attendance: 948; Referee: Zamzaidi Katimin

==== Semi-finals ====
13 October 2017 First Leg	FELDA United (Kuala Lumpur)	1−1	Kedah	Jengka, Pahang
21:00 UTC+8	Hadin 88'	Report	Sandro 62' (pen.)	Stadium: Tun Abdul Razak Stadium; Attendance: 7,976; Referee: Muhd Rahmat Jantan

20 October 2017 Second Leg	Kedah	2−0 (3−1 agg.)	(Kuala Lumpur) FELDA United	Alor Setar, Kedah
21:00 UTC+8	Sandro 71', 85'			Stadium: Darul Aman Stadium

=== AFC Cup ===
==== Group stage ====
Pos	Team	Pld	W	D	L	GF	GA	GD	Pts	Qualification	CER	HAN	TAM	FEL
1	(Philippines) Ceres–Negros	6	3	2	1	16	8	+8	11 (Note: Head-to-head results: Hà Nội 1–1 Ceres–Negros, Ceres–Negros 6–2 Hà Nội.)	Zonal semi-finals	—	6–2	5–0	0–0
2	(Vietnam) Hà Nội	6	3	2	1	14	10	+4	11		1–1	—	4–0	4–1
3	(Singapore) Tampines Rovers	6	2	0	4	8	17	−9	6		2–4	1–2	—	2–1
4	(Malaysia) FELDA United	6	1	2	3	7	10	−3	5		3–0	1–1	1–3	—

Source: AFC
Rules for classification: Group stage tiebreakers
Notes:

Win Draw Loss

21 February 2017 1	Tampines Rovers (Singapore)	2−1	(Malaysia) FELDA United	Singapore
19:30 UTC+8	Son 64'; Khairul 83'	Report	Fazrul 86'	Stadium: Jalan Besar Stadium; Attendance: 1,277; Referee: Takuto Okabe (Japan)

7 March 2017 2	FELDA United (Malaysia)	1−1	(Vietnam) Hà Nội	Shah Alam
16:45 UTC+8	Krangar 23'	Report	Đỗ Hùng Dũng 90+1'	Stadium: Shah Alam Stadium; Attendance: 200; Referee: Ahmed Faisal Mohammad Alali (Jordan)

15 March 2017 3	Ceres-Negros (Philippines)	0−0	(Malaysia) FELDA United	Bacolod
19:30 UTC+8		Report		Stadium: Panaad Park and Stadium; Attendance: 8,965; Referee: Wang Di (China)

4 April 2017 4	FELDA United (Malaysia)	3−0	(Philippines) Ceres-Negros	Shah Alam
16:45 UTC+8	Syahid 5'; Hadin 66'; Fazrul 77'	Report		Stadium: Shah Alam Stadium; Attendance: 250; Referee: Shukri Husain A Alhunfush (Saudi Arabia)

19 April 2017 5	FELDA United (Malaysia)	1−3	(Singapore) Tampines Rovers	Jengka
20:45 UTC+8	Norshahrul 51'	Report	Džoni 29'; Amri 68', 72'	Stadium: Tun Abdul Razak Stadium; Attendance: 2,252; Referee: Lau Fong Hei (Hong Kong)

3 May 2017 6	Hà Nội (Vietnam)	4−1	(Malaysia) FELDA United	Hanoi
18:30 UTC+8	Phạm Đức Huy 52'; Nguyễn Văn Quyết 76', 86'; Đỗ Hùng Dũng 90'	Report	Cellerino 90+3' (pen.)	Stadium: Mỹ Đình National Stadium; Attendance: 1,800; Referee: Yaqoob Abdul Baki (Oman)

== Squad statistics ==
=== Appearances ===
No.	Pos.	Name	League	Piala FA	Piala Malaysia	AFC Cup	Total
1	GK	(Malaysia) Kalamullah Al-Hafiz	0	0	0	0	0
2	DF	(Australia) Dino Djulbic	8	0	10	0	18
3	DF	(Malaysia) Norfazly Alias	7+4	1	1+1	5	14+5
6	MF	(Malaysia) Muhd Rizqi Azman	0	0	0	0	0
7	DF	(Malaysia) Khairul Ismail	0+2	0	0	0	0+2
8	FW	(Brazil) Thiago Augusto Fernandes	9	0	9	0	18
9	FW	(Malaysia) Norshahrul Idlan	15+4	1	6+2	5	27+6
10	MF	(Liberia) Zah Rahan Krangar (Vice-captain)	20	1	9+1	6	36+1
11	MF	(Malaysia) Wan Zack Haikal	12+2	0	6+4	2	20+6
12	DF	(Malaysia) Shukor Adan (Captain)	19+1	1	9	3+1	32+2
13	MF	(Malaysia) Mohd Rafiq Shah Zaim	0	0	0	0	0
14	FW	(Nigeria) Ifedayo Olusegun	8+1	0	8+1	0	16+1
15	DF	(Malaysia) K. Prabakaran	4	0	3	0	7
16	MF	(Malaysia) (Scotland) Stuart Wark	17+2	1	6	6	30+2
17	FW	(Malaysia) Fakrul Aiman Sidid	1+7	0+1	1	1+2	3+10
18	DF	(Malaysia) Mohd Aizulridzwan Razali	3+2	1	0+1	1+2	5+5
19	MF	(Malaysia) Fazrul Hazli Kadri	4+7	0+1	0	0+3	4+11
20	DF	(Malaysia) Wan Amirul Afiq Wan Abdul Rahman	13+3	0	5+2	5	22+5
21	MF	(Malaysia) Mohd Syahid Zaidon	3+2	0	0	3+1	6+3
23	DF	(Malaysia) Safwan Hashim	3+1	0	4+2	0	7+3
24	GK	(Malaysia) Ilham Amirullah Razali	0	0	2	1	3
25	DF	(Malaysia) Ahmad Azriddin Rosli	2+4	0	1+1	0+1	3+6
26	DF	(Malaysia) Hasni Zaidi Jamian	7+2	1	1+1	1	10+3
27	MF	(Malaysia) Hadin Azman	12+3	1	2+4	5+1	20+8
28	MF	(Malaysia) Alif Yusof	16+2	0	9	5	30+2
29	MF	(Malaysia) Curran Singh Ferns	8	0	6+3	0	14+3
30	GK	(Malaysia) Mohd Farizal Harun	22	1	8	5	36
31	DF	(Malaysia) Ali Imran Alimi	0	0	0+1	0	0+1
32	MF	(Malaysia) Muhammad Danial Amier Norhisham	1+4	0	4+3	0	5+7
Left club during season
4	DF	(Malaysia) Muhd Ilham Yusuf	0	0	0	0	0
5	DF	(Lebanon) Mootaz El Jounaidi	12	1	0	5	18
8	FW	(Argentina) Lucas Cano	9+2	0	0	5	14+2
29	MF	(Malaysia) Mohd Ridzuan Abdunloh	0+2	0	0	1	1+2
23	FW	(Argentina) Gastón Cellerino	7+4	1	0	1+4	9+7
–	DF	(Malaysia) Mohd Farid Ramli	0	0	0	0	0

Updated to match played 29 October 2017
Source: Competitions

=== Top scorers ===
The list is sorted by shirt number when total goals are equal.

Rnk	Pos	No.	Player	Liga Super	Piala FA	Piala Malaysia	AFC Cup	Total
1	FW	9	(Brazil) Thiago Augusto	14	0	4	0	18
2	FW	14	(Nigeria) Ifedayo Olusegun	5	0	4	0	9
3	MF	10	(Liberia) Zah Rahan Krangar	3	0	3	2	8
4	FW	8	(Argentina) **Lucas Cano**	6	0	0	0	6
5	FW	9	(Malaysia) Norshahrul Idlan	4	0	0	1	5
5	MF	11	(Malaysia) Wan Zack Haikal	3	0	2	0	5
5	MF	27	(Malaysia) Hadin Azman	2	0	2	1	5
8	DF	12	(Malaysia) Shukor Adan	1	0	1	0	2
8	MF	19	(Malaysia) Fazrul Hazli Kadri	0	0	0	2	2
8	FW	23	(Argentina) **Gastón Cellerino**	1	0	0	1	2
11	MF	16	(Malaysia) Stuart Wark	1	0	0	0	1
11	MF	21	(Malaysia) Syahid Zaidon	0	0	0	1	1
11	MF	32	(Malaysia) Danial Amier	0	0	1	0	1
**Total**				**39**	**0**	**17**	**7**	59

Updated to match played 29 October 2017
Source: Competitions
*Player names in bold denotes player that left mid-season

=== Clean sheets ===
The list is sorted by shirt number when total clean sheets are equal.

Rnk	No.	Player	Liga Super	Piala FA	Piala Malaysia	Total
1	30	(Malaysia) Mohd Farizal Harun	4	0	1	5
**Total**			**4**	**0**	**1**	**5**

Updated to match played 29 October 2017
Source: Competitions

== Transfers ==
First transfer window started in December 2017 to 22 January 2017 and second transfer window started on 15 May 2017 to 11 June 2017.

=== In ===
==== Second window ====
Date	Pos	Player	Transferred From
June 2017	DF	(Malaysia) Kanadasan Prabakaran	(Malaysia) Perlis
June 2017	DF	(Australia) Dino Djulbic	(Australia) Perth Glory
June 2017	MF	(Malaysia) Curran Singh Ferns	(Malaysia) Negeri Sembilan
June 2017	FW	(Brazil) Thiago Augusto Fernandes	(Bahrain) Manama Club
June 2017	FW	(Nigeria) Ifedayo Olusegun	(Bahrain) Al-Hidd

=== Out ===
==== First window ====
Date	Pos	Player	Transferred To
December 2016	DF	(Malaysia) B. Sanjef Dinesh	(Malaysia) Johor Darul Ta'zim III
December 2016	GK	(Malaysia) Fairul Azwan Shahrullai	(Malaysia) PJ Rangers
December 2016	FWD	(Malaysia) Mohd Ferris Danial	(Malaysia) Terengganu
December 2016	DF	(Malaysia) Adib Aizuddin Abdul Latif	(Malaysia) Terengganu
December 2016	DF	(Malaysia) Mohd Firdaus Faudzi	(Malaysia) Terengganu
December 2016	MF	(Malaysia) Abdul Shukur Jusoh	(Malaysia) Terengganu
December 2016	GK	(Malaysia) Mohd Suffian Abdul Rahman	(Malaysia) Terengganu
December 2016	DF	(Malaysia) Mohd Idris Ahmad	(Malaysia) Perak
December 2016	DF	(Brazil) Gilberto Alemao	(Vietnam) Sài Gòn
December 2016	MF	(Malaysia) Ahmad Syamim Yahya	(Malaysia) Pahang
December 2016	MF	(Malaysia) D. Christie Jayaseelan	(Malaysia) Pahang
December 2016	MF	(Malaysia) S. Sivanesan	(Malaysia) PKNS
December 2016	MF	(Malaysia) Ahmad Ezrie Shafizie	(Malaysia) Terengganu
December 2016	FW	(Malaysia) Bobby Gonzales	(Malaysia) PKNS
December 2016	FW	(Liberia) Francis Doe	(Malaysia) Selangor
December 2016	FW	(Brazil) Thiago Augusto Fernandes	(Bahrain) Manama Club
8 January 2017	MF	(Uzbekistan) Lutfulla Turaev	(Malaysia) Terengganu

==== Second window ====
Date	Pos	Player	Transferred To
June 2017	DF	(Lebanon) Mootaz El Jounaidi	Unattached
June 2017	DF	(Malaysia) Mohd Ridzuan Abdunloh	(Malaysia) Terengganu
June 2017	FW	(Argentina) Lucas Cano	(Argentina) Argentinos Juniors
June 2017	FW	(Argentina) Gastón Cellerino	Unattached
10 June 2017	DF	(Malaysia) Muhd Ilham Yusof	(Malaysia) UiTM

=== Loan in ===
==== First window ====
Date	Pos	Player	Loaned From
5 January 2017	FW	(Argentina) Lucas Cano	(Argentina) Argentinos Juniors

=== Loan out ===
==== Second window ====
Date	Pos	Player	Loaned To
June 2017	DF	(Malaysia) Mohd Farid Ramli	(Malaysia) Kuala Lumpur
