= 2017 Malaysia Cup knockout stage =

Football tournament results

The 2017 Malaysia Cup knockout phase began on 15 September 2017 and concluded on 4 November 2017 with the final at Shah Alam Stadium in Selangor, Malaysia to decide the champions of the 2017 Malaysia Cup. A total of 8 teams competed in the knockout phase.

== Round and draw dates ==
The draw for the 2017 Malaysia Cup was held on at the 22 May 2017 with the participating team coaches and captains in attendance.

Round	Draw date and time	First leg	Second leg
Quarter-finals	22 May 2017, 22:30 UTC+8	15–16 September 2017	24 September 2017
Semi-finals	22 May 2017, 22:30 UTC+8	15 October 2017	21 October 2017
Final	22 May 2017, 22:30 UTC+8	4 November 2017 at Shah Alam Stadium, Shah Alam, Selangor	

== Format ==
The knockout phase involved the eight teams which qualified as winners and runners-up of each of the eight groups in the group stage.

Each tie in the knockout phase, apart from the final, was played over two legs, with each team playing one leg at home. The team that scored more goals on aggregate over the two legs advanced to the next round. If the aggregate score was level, the away goals rule was applied, i.e. the team that scored more goals away from home over the two legs advanced. If away goals were also equal, then thirty minutes of extra time was played. The away goals rule was again applied after extra time, i.e. if there were goals scored during extra time and the aggregate score was still level, the visiting team advanced by virtue of more away goals scored. If no goals were scored during extra time, the tie was decided by penalty shoot-out. In the final, which was played as a single match, if scores were level at the end of normal time, extra time was played, followed by penalty shoot-out if scores remained tied.

The mechanism of the draws for each round was as follows:

- In the draw for the quarter-final, the four group winners were seeded, and the four group runners-up were unseeded. The seeded teams were drawn against the unseeded teams, with the seeded teams hosting the second leg. Teams from the same group or the same association could not be drawn against each other.
- In the draws for the quarter-finals onwards, there were no seedings, and teams from the same group or the same association could be drawn against each other.

== Qualified teams ==
Group	Winners (Seeded in quarter final draw)	Runners-up (Unseeded in quarter final draw)
A	(Perak) PKNP	Pahang
B	Perak	(Pahang) FELDA United
C	Kedah	(Malacca) Melaka United
D	Johor Darul Ta'zim	Selangor

== Bracket ==
Quarter-finals
B2	(Pahang) FELDA United	1	4	5
A1	(Perak) PKNP	3	1	4
D2	Selangor	2	0	2
C1	Kedah	3	1	4
A2	Pahang	3	0	3
B1	Perak	1	4	5
C2	(Malacca) Melaka United	1	1	2
D1	Johor Darul Ta'zim	4	1	5

Semi-finals
(Pahang) FELDA United	1	0	1
Kedah	1	2	3
Perak	1	0	1
Johor Darul Ta'zim	1	3	4

Final
Kedah	0
Johor Darul Ta'zim	2

== Quarter-finals ==
The first legs were played on 15 & 16 September 2017, and the second legs were played on 24 September 2017.

Team 1	Agg.	Team 2	1st leg	2nd leg
FELDA United (Pahang)	5–4	(Perak) PKNP	1–3	4–1
Selangor	2–4	Kedah	2–3	0–1
Melaka United (Malacca)	2–5	Johor Darul Ta'zim	1–4	1–1
Pahang	3–5	Perak	3–1	0–4

=== Matches ===
First leg

15 September 2017
21:00 UTC+8

FELDA United (Pahang)	1–3	(Perak) PKNP
Hadin 77'	Report	Shahrel 11', 45', 68'

Tun Abdul Razak Stadium, Jengka
Attendance: 1,549
Referee: Suhaimi Mat Hassan

Second leg

24 September 2017
21:00 UTC+8

PKNP (Perak)	1–4	(Pahang) FELDA United
Hyun-woo 8'	Report	Zack 35', 45'; Ifedayo 37'; Zah Rahan 49'

Shah Alam Stadium, Shah Alam
Attendance: 948
Referee: Zamzaidi Katimin

FELDA United won 5–4 on aggregate.

First leg

15 September 2017
21:00 UTC+8

Selangor	2–3	Kedah
Rufino 53', 71'	Report	Ilsø 7', 15'; Syazwan 68'

Majlis Perbandaran Selayang Stadium, Selayang
Attendance: 7,282
Referee: Nazmi Nasaruddin

Second leg

24 September 2017
21:00 UTC+8

Kedah	1–0	Selangor
Sandro 30' (pen.)	Report

Darulaman Stadium, Alor Setar
Attendance: 23,000
Referee: Nagor Amir Noor Mohamed

Kedah won 4–2 on aggregate.

First leg

15 September 2017
21:00 UTC+8

Melaka United (Malacca)	1–4	Johor Darul Ta'zim
Šimić 45+1'	Report	Ghaddar 7', 34'; Insa 68'; Safiq 85'

Hang Jebat Stadium, Krubong
Attendance: 14,336
Referee: Khirulazuan Kidam

Second leg

24 September 2017
21:00 UTC+8

Johor Darul Ta'zim	1–1	(Malacca) Melaka United
Nazmi 21'	Report	Felipe 44' (pen.)

Tan Sri Dato' Haji Hassan Yunos Stadium, Larkin
Attendance: 10,230
Referee: Zulkarnain Zakaria

Johor Darul Ta'zim won 5–2 on aggregate.

First leg

16 September 2017
21:00 UTC+8

Pahang	3–1	Perak
Zaharulnizam 36'; Afif 38'; Davies 41'	Report	Gilmar 69'

Darulmakmur Stadium, Kuantan
Attendance: 11,881
Referee: Razlan Joffri Ali

Second leg

24 September 2017
21:00 UTC+8

Perak	4–0	Pahang
Gilmar 3', 63'; Pallraj 77'; Nazrin 90+1'	Report

Perak Stadium, Ipoh
Attendance: 9,015
Referee: Suhaimi Mat Hassan

Perak won 5–3 on aggregate.

== Semi-finals ==
The first legs were played on 15 October 2017, and the second legs were played on 21 October 2017.

Team 1	Agg.	Team 2	1st leg	2nd leg
FELDA United (Pahang)	1–3	Kedah	1–1	0–2
Perak	1–4	Johor Darul Ta'zim	1–1	0–3

=== Matches ===
First leg

15 October 2017
21:00 UTC+8

FELDA United (Pahang)	1–1	Kedah
Hadin 88'	Report	Sandro 62' (pen.)

Tun Abdul Razak Stadium, Jengka
Attendance: 7,976
Referee: Rahmat Jantan

Second leg

21 October 2017
21:00 UTC+8

Kedah	2–0	(Pahang) FELDA United
Sandro 71', 86'	Report

Darul Aman Stadium, Alor Setar
Attendance: 23,000
Referee: Nazmi Nasaruddin

Kedah won 3–1 on aggregate.

First leg

15 October 2017
21:00 UTC+8

Perak	1–1	Johor Darul Ta'zim
Hasbullah 19' (o.g.)	Report	Ghaddar 68'

Perak Stadium, Ipoh
Attendance: 28,000
Referee: Razlan Joffri Ali

Second leg

21 October 2017
21:00 UTC+8

Johor Darul Ta'zim	3–0	Perak
Cabrera 57', 81'; Guerra 75'	Report

Tan Sri Dato' Haji Hassan Yunos Stadium, Larkin
Attendance: 21,140
Referee: Zohri Tajuddin

Johor Darul Ta'zim won 4–1 on aggregate.

== Final ==
The final will be played on 4 November 2017 at the Shah Alam Stadium in Shah Alam.

4 November 2017
21:20 UTC+8

Kedah	0–2	Johor Darul Ta'zim
	Report	Aidil 3'; Cabrera 63'

Shah Alam Stadium, Shah Alam
Attendance: 79,740
Referee: Razlan Joffri Ali
