= 2017 Malaysia Cup final =

- Match programme cover
- Event: 2017 Malaysia Cup
Kedah	Johor Darul Ta'zim
(Kedah)	(Johor)
0	2
- Date: 4 November 2017
- Venue: Shah Alam Stadium, Shah Alam, Selangor
- Man of the Match: (Argentina) Gonzalo Cabrera (Johor Darul Ta'zim)
- Referee: Razlan Joffri Ali
- Attendance: 79,740
- Weather: Partly cloudy 30 °C (86 °F); 75% humidity

The 2017 Malaysia Cup final was a football match which were played on 4 November 2017, to determine the champion of the 2017 Malaysia Cup. It was the final of the 91st edition of the Malaysia Cup, competition organised by the Football Association of Malaysia.

It was played at the Shah Alam Stadium, in Shah Alam, Selangor, between Kedah and Johor Darul Ta'zim. Johor Darul Ta'zim won the match 2–0 to secure their first title in this competition. The defending champions Kedah, have successfully reach the final for the third time in a row (2015, 2016, 2017). However, Kedah lost this year, for eight time in thirteen finals reached.

== Venue ==
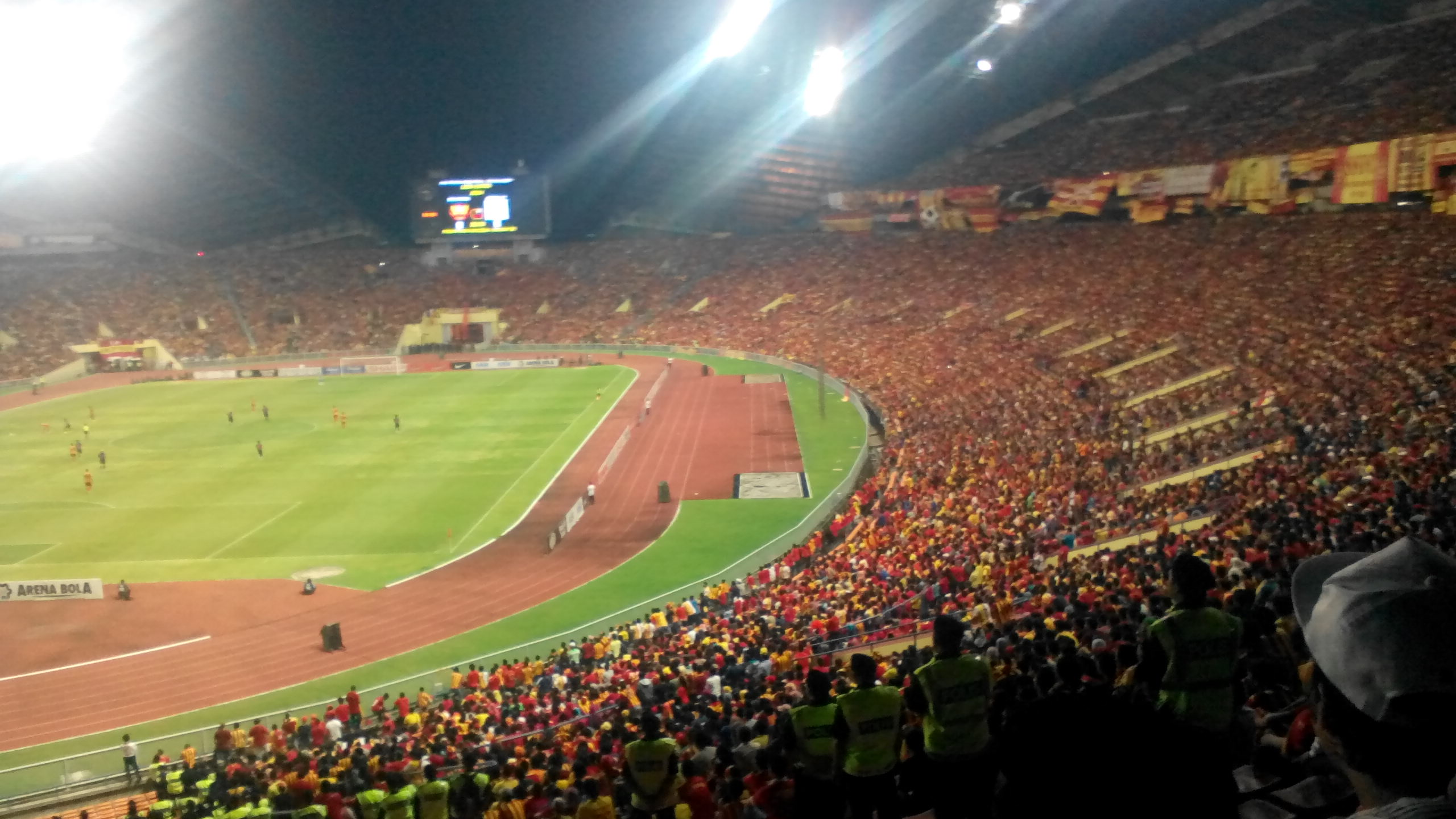
The Shah Alam Stadium in Shah Alam hosted the final.

Shah Alam Stadium was announced as the final venue on 4 November 2017, following the decision of the Football Malaysia Limited Liability Partnership (FMLLP) on 12 September 2017, after the Bukit Jalil National Stadium had already been booked for another event.

== Road to final ==
Note: In all results below, the score of the finalist is given first.

Kedah				Round	Johor Darul Ta'zim			
Opponent	Result			Group stage	Opponent	Result		
(Malacca) Melaka United	2–0 (H)			Matchday 1	Sarawak	4–0 (H)		
(Selangor) UiTM	5–0 (A)			Matchday 2	Terengganu	0–0 (A)		
Kelantan	1–3 (A)			Matchday 3	Selangor	2–3 (A)		
(Malacca) Melaka United	6–2 (A)			Matchday 4	Sarawak	2–0 (A)		
(Selangor) UiTM	1–0 (H)			Matchday 5	Terengganu	5–0 (H)		
Kelantan	2–0 (H)			Matchday 6	Selangor	3–1 (H)		
Group C winners: Pos / Team / Pld / Pts; 1 / Kedah / 6 / 15; 2 / (Malacca) Melaka United / 6 / 9; 3 / Kelantan / 6 / 6; 4 / (Selangor) UiTM / 6 / 6; Updated to match(es) played on 9 September 2017. Source: FAM FMLLP				Final standings	Group D winners: Pos / Team / Pld / Pts; 1 / Johor Darul Ta'zim / 6 / 13; 2 / Selangor / 6 / 10; 3 / Sarawak / 6 / 5; 4 / Terengganu / 6 / 4; Updated to match(es) played on 9 September 2017. Source: FAM FMLLP			
Opponent	Agg.	1st leg	2nd leg	Knockout phase	Opponent	Agg.	1st leg	2nd leg
Selangor	4–2	3–2 (A)	1–0 (H)	Quarter-finals	(Malacca) Melaka United	5–2	4–1 (A)	1–1 (H)
(Pahang) FELDA United	3–1	1–1 (A)	2–0 (H)	Semi-finals	Perak	4–1	1–1 (A)	3–0 (H)

== Match details ==
4 November 2017
21:20 UTC+8

Kedah	0–2	Johor Darul Ta'zim
	Report	Aidil 3'; Cabrera 63'

Shah Alam Stadium, Shah Alam, Selangor
Attendance: 79,740
Referee: Razlan Joffri Ali

Kedah	Johor Darul Ta'zim

GK	25	(Malaysia) Ifwat Akmal
RB	15	(Malaysia) Rizal Ghazali
CB	13	(Malaysia) Khairul Helmi (c)
CB	4	(Australia) Zac Anderson
LB	27	(Malaysia) Ariff Farhan
RM	7	(Malaysia) Baddrol Bakhtiar		(substituted off) 78'
CM	8	(Kosovo) Liridon Krasniqi
CM	16	(Malaysia) Amirul Hisyam
LM	22	(Malaysia) Syazwan Zainon		(substituted off) 82'
CF	10	(Brazil) Sandro		(substituted off) 83'
CF	9	(Denmark) Ken Ilsø	(yellow card) 90+3'
Substitutes:
GK	1	(Malaysia) Abdul Hadi
DF	2	(Malaysia) Syawal Nordin
DF	3	(Malaysia) Fitri Omar	(yellow card) 90+2'	(substituted in) 82'
MF	12	(Malaysia) Akram Mahinan		(substituted in) 83'
FW	14	(Malaysia) Fakri Saarani
DF	17	(Malaysia) Syazwan Tajuddin
MF	19	(Malaysia) Farhan Roslan		(substituted in) 78'
Manager:
(Malaysia) Nidzam Adzha

GK	24	(Malaysia) Izham Tarmizi
RB	12	(Malaysia) S. Kunanlan	(yellow card) 15'
CB	7	(Malaysia) Aidil Zafuan		(substituted off) 60'
CB	17	(Malaysia) Fadhli Shas
LB	15	(Malaysia) Fazly Mazlan		(substituted off) 85'
RM	8	(Malaysia) Safiq Rahim (c)
CM	13	(Malaysia) Gary Steven Robbat		(substituted off) 58'
LM	50	(Malaysia) (Spain) Natxo Insa
RW	11	(Argentina) Gonzalo Cabrera
CF	9	(Malaysia) Hazwan Bakri
LW	10	(Argentina) Gabriel Guerra	(yellow card) 31'
Substitutions:
MF	4	(Malaysia) Afiq Fazail	(yellow card) 65'	(substituted in) 58'
DF	20	(Malaysia) Azrif Nasrulhaq		(substituted in) 85'
MF	21	(Malaysia) Nazmi Faiz
FW	22	(Lebanon) Mohammed Ghaddar
DF	25	(Malaysia) Junior Eldstål		(substituted in) 60'
FW	28	(Malaysia) Darren Lok
GK	30	(Malaysia) Haziq Nadzli
Manager:
(Portugal) Ulisses Morais

Officials

- Assistant referees:
  - Mohd Yusri Mohd
  - Muhd Juhairi Idris
- Fourth Official:
  - Anuar Musa @ Majid
- Additional assistant referees:
  - Suhaimi Mat Hassan
  - Suresh Jayaraman

Match Rules

- 90 minutes.
- 30 minutes of extra time if necessary.
- Penalty shoot-out if scores still level.
- Seven named substitutes.
- Maximum of three substitutions.

=== Statistics ===
Overall
Statistic	Kedah	Johor Darul Ta'zim
Goals scored	0	2
Total shots	4	10
Shots on target	1	5
Saves	0	0
Ball possession	55%	45%
Corner kicks	2	1
Fouls committed	14	13
Offsides	4	0
Yellow cards	2	3
Red cards	0	0

== See also ==
- 2017 Malaysia FA Cup Final
