= 2017 Malaysia Cup group stage =

Malaysian soccer tournament

The 2017 Malaysia Cup group stage featured 16 teams. The teams were drawn into four groups of four, and played each other home-and-away in a round-robin format. The top two teams in each group advanced to the 2017 Malaysia Cup quarter finals.

== Groups ==
The matchdays started on 4 July 2017.

=== Group A ===
Pos	Team	Pld	W	D	L	GF	GA	GD	Pts	Qualification
1	(Perak) PKNP	6	3	2	1	9	9	0	11	Advance to knockout phase
2	Pahang	6	2	3	1	14	8	+6	9	Advance to knockout phase
3	Negeri Sembilan	6	1	3	2	8	12	−4	6	
4	(Terengganu) T–Team	6	1	2	3	12	14	−2	5	

Updated to match(es) played on 9 September 2017. Source: FAM FMLLP
4 July 2017
21:00 UTC+8

Pahang	2–2	Negeri Sembilan
Alves 59', 64'	Report	Béhé 44'; Tuck 76'

Darul Makmur Stadium, Kuantan
Attendance: 5,292
Referee: Wan Mohd Tarmizi
4 July 2017
21:00 UTC+8

T–Team (Terengganu)	1–2	(Perak) PKNP
Samassa 51'	Report	Shahrel 23', 52'

Sultan Ismail Nasiruddin Shah Stadium, Kuala Terengganu
Attendance: 1,271
Referee: Suresh Jayaraman

7 July 2017
21:00 UTC+8

Negeri Sembilan	3–3	(Terengganu) T–Team
Bruno 4'; Béhé 24'; Farderin 84'	Report	Annas 54' (o.g.); Fakhrurazi 75'; Sharofetdinov 90+5' (pen.)

Tuanku Abdul Rahman Stadium, Paroi
Attendance: 5,307
Referee: Razlan Joffri Ali
7 July 2017
21:00 UTC+8

PKNP (Perak)	1–1	Pahang
Afif 81' (o.g.)	Report	Alves 52'

Perak Stadium, Ipoh
Attendance: 3,372
Referee: Rahmat Jantan

18 July 2017
16:45 UTC+8

PKNP (Perak)	2–0	Negeri Sembilan
Gilberto 84' (pen.), 90+3'	Report

Proton City Stadium, Tanjung Malim
Attendance: 457
Referee: Suresh Jayaraman
18 July 2017
21:00 UTC+8

T–Team (Terengganu)	1–1	Pahang
Hakim 7'	Report	Sumareh 2'

Sultan Ismail Nasiruddin Shah Stadium, Kuala Terengganu
Attendance: 1,349
Referee: Amirul Izwan Yaacob

29 July 2017
16:45 UTC+8

PKNP (Perak)	4–1	(Terengganu) T–Team
Hyun-woo 31'; Shahrel 40'; Hafiz 47'; Weijl 73'	Report	N'Djeng 79'

Proton City Stadium, Tanjung Malim
Attendance: 229
Referee: Zulkarnain Zakaria
29 July 2017
21:00 UTC+8

Negeri Sembilan	2–1	Pahang
Farderin 11'; Khairul 36'	Report	Jae-won 89'

Tuanku Abdul Rahman Stadium, Paroi
Attendance: 4,877
Referee: Wan Mohd Tarmizi

1 August 2017
21:00 UTC+8

Pahang	6–0	(Perak) PKNP
Zaharulnizam 29', 52'; Kalang Tie 34', 43'; Afif 84'; Alves 87'	Report

Darul Makmur Stadium, Kuantan
Attendance: 1,990
Referee: Razlan Joffri Ali
1 August 2017
21:00 UTC+8

T–Team (Terengganu)	4–1	Negeri Sembilan
Asrol 25'; Amirzafran 40'; Sharofetdinov 49'; Fakhrurazi 80'	Report	Nizam 79'

Sultan Ismail Nasiruddin Shah Stadium, Kuala Terengganu
Attendance: 250
Referee: Suresh Jayaraman

9 September 2017
21:00 UTC+8

Pahang	3–2	(Terengganu) T–Team
Alves 41'; Azam 54'; Romero 85'	Report	Sobri 52'; Maïga 57'

Darul Makmur Stadium, Kuantan
Attendance: 6,878
Referee: Rahmat Jantan
9 September 2017
21:00 UTC+8

Negeri Sembilan	0–0	(Perak) PKNP
	Report

Tuanku Abdul Rahman Stadium, Paroi
Attendance: 1,394
Referee: Nagor Amir Noor Mohamed

=== Group B ===
Pos	Team	Pld	W	D	L	GF	GA	GD	Pts	Qualification
1	Perak	6	5	1	0	13	3	+10	16	Advance to knockout phase
2	(Pahang) FELDA United	6	3	2	1	11	7	+4	11	Advance to knockout phase
3	Kuala Lumpur	6	1	2	3	3	9	−6	5	
4	(Selangor) PKNS	6	0	1	5	4	12	−8	1	

Updated to match(es) played on 9 September 2017. Source: FAM FMLLP
4 July 2017
21:00 UTC+8

Perak	2–0	(Selangor) PKNS
Thiago Junior 71'; Gilmar 80'	Report

Perak Stadium, Ipoh
Attendance: 5,200
Referee: Fitri Maskon
4 July 2017
21:00 UTC+8

FELDA United (Pahang)	0–0	Kuala Lumpur
	Report

Tun Abdul Razak Stadium, Jengka
Attendance: 990
Referee: Nafeez Abd Wahab

7 July 2017
16:45 UTC+8

Kuala Lumpur	0–3	Perak
	Report	Gilmar 58', 82'; Dos Santos 72'

Majlis Perbandaran Selayang Stadium, Selayang
Attendance: 1,188
Referee: Suhaizi Shukri
8 July 2017
21:00 UTC+8

PKNS (Selangor)	1–2	(Pahang) FELDA United
Wleh 45+2'	Report	Zah Rahan 5'; Thiago Augusto 88'

Shah Alam Stadium, Shah Alam
Attendance: 210
Referee: Suhaimi Mat Hassan

18 July 2017
21:00 UTC+8

FELDA United (Pahang)	1–1	Perak
Zah Rahan 67'	Report	Shahrul 66'

Tun Abdul Razak Stadium, Jengka
Attendance: 1,320
Referee: Suhaimi Mat Hassan
18 July 2017
21:00 UTC+8

PKNS (Selangor)	0–0	Kuala Lumpur
	Report

Shah Alam Stadium, Shah Alam
Attendance: 44
Referee: Fitri Maskon

29 July 2017
21:00 UTC+8

PKNS (Selangor)	1–3	Perak
Wleh 84'	Report	Pinto 28' (pen.); Nazrin 61'; Gilmar 77'

Shah Alam Stadium, Shah Alam
Attendance: 2,966
Referee: Zamzaidi Katimin
29 July 2017
21:00 UTC+8

Kuala Lumpur	1–4	(Pahang) FELDA United
de Paula 90+2'	Report	Thiago Augusto 28', 49', 53'; Ifedayo 57'

Majlis Perbandaran Selayang Stadium, Selayang
Attendance: 459
Referee: Khirulazuan Kidam

1 August 2017
21:00 UTC+8

Perak	2–0	Kuala Lumpur
Gilmar 22'; Pallraj 37'	Report

Perak Stadium, Ipoh
Attendance: 3,525
Referee: Ku Alauddin Ku Muhammad
1 August 2017
21:00 UTC+8

FELDA United (Pahang)	3–2	(Selangor) PKNS
Ifedayo 46', 75'; Shukor 73'	Report	Gonzales 31'; Nazrin 61' (pen.)

Tun Abdul Razak Stadium, Jengka
Attendance: 1,129
Referee: Nafeez Abd Wahab

9 September 2017
21:00 UTC+8

Perak	2–1	(Pahang) FELDA United
Nizad 25'; Shahrul 80'	Report	Danial 52'

Perak Stadium, Ipoh
Attendance: 3,720
Referee: Razlan Joffri Ali
9 September 2017
21:00 UTC+8

Kuala Lumpur	2–0	(Selangor) PKNS
de Paula 48', 83'	Report

Majlis Perbandaran Selayang Stadium, Selayang
Attendance: 115
Referee: Ku Alauddin Ku Muhammad

=== Group C ===
Pos	Team	Pld	W	D	L	GF	GA	GD	Pts	Qualification
1	Kedah	6	5	0	1	17	5	+12	15	Advance to knockout phase
2	(Malacca) Melaka United	6	3	0	3	13	16	−3	9	Advance to knockout phase
3	Kelantan	6	2	0	4	8	12	−4	6	
4	(Selangor) UiTM	6	2	0	4	9	14	−5	6	

Updated to match(es) played on 9 September 2017. Source: FAM FMLLP
4 July 2017
21:00 UTC+8

Kedah	2–0	(Malacca) Melaka United
Sandro 30'; Baddrol 64'	Report

Darul Aman Stadium, Alor Setar
Attendance: 4,500
Referee: Amirul Izwan Yaacob
4 July 2017
21:00 UTC+8

Kelantan	3–1	(Selangor) UiTM
Izuan 42', 63'; Abou Bakr 90+3'	Report	Wasiu 52'

Sultan Muhammad IV Stadium, Kota Bharu
Attendance: 1,633
Referee: Fairuzi Mat Desa

7 July 2017
21:00 UTC+8

UiTM (Selangor)	0–5	Kedah
	Report	Syafiq 3'; Liridon 44'; Ilsø 81'; Sandro 90+1'; Faiz 90+3' (o.g.)

UiTM Stadium, Shah Alam
Attendance: 2,985
Referee: Nagor Amir Noor Mohamed
8 July 2017
21:00 UTC+8

Melaka United (Malacca)	3–0	Kelantan
Šimić 21'; Surendran 30'; Fauzi 50'	Report

Hang Jebat Stadium, Krubong
Attendance: 5,529
Referee: Khirulazuan Kidam

18 July 2017
21:00 UTC+8

Kelantan	3–1	Kedah
Gomis 5'; Abou Bakr 66', 90+4'	Report	Liridon 85' (pen.)

Sultan Muhammad IV Stadium, Kota Bharu
Attendance: 2,357
Referee: Razlan Joffri Ali
18 July 2017
21:00 UTC+8

Melaka United (Malacca)	2–1	(Selangor) UiTM
Felipe 23', 64'	Report	Wasiu 45+1'

Hang Jebat Stadium, Krubong
Attendance: 1,288
Referee: Khirulazuan Kidam

29 July 2017
21:00 UTC+8

Melaka United (Malacca)	2–6	Kedah
Azniee 22'; Fauzi 53'	Report	Fakri 5'; Sandro 35', 39'; Akram 45+3'; Ilsø 77'; Akhyar 90+1'

Hang Jebat Stadium, Krubong
Attendance: 6,548
Referee: Suhaimi Mat Hassan
29 July 2017
21:00 UTC+8

UiTM (Selangor)	2–0	Kelantan
Wasiu 7', 45+2'	Report

UiTM Stadium, Shah Alam
Attendance: 1,700
Referee: Amirul Izwan Yaacob

1 August 2017
21:00 UTC+8

Kedah	1–0	(Selangor) UiTM
Liridon 24'	Report

Darul Aman Stadium, Alor Setar
Attendance: 10,300
Referee: Zulkarnain Zakaria
2 August 2017
21:00 UTC+8

Kelantan	2–3	(Malacca) Melaka United
Izuan 50'; Danso 86'	Report	Woo-young 5', 31'; Šimić 33'

Sultan Muhammad IV Stadium, Kota Bharu
Attendance: 2,699
Referee: Suhaimi Mat Hassan

9 September 2017
21:00 UTC+8

Kedah	2–0	Kelantan
Sandro 24'; Ilsø 77'	Report

Darul Aman Stadium, Alor Setar
Attendance: 10,000
Referee: Nazmi Nasaruddin
9 September 2017
21:00 UTC+8

UiTM (Selangor)	5–3	(Malacca) Melaka United
Wasiu 13', 38', 90+1'; Dong-hyun 30' (pen.), 73'	Report	Woo-young 34'; Azniee 56'; Fauzi 87'

UiTM Stadium, Shah Alam
Attendance: 439
Referee: Samsudin Ibrahim

=== Group D ===
Pos	Team	Pld	W	D	L	GF	GA	GD	Pts	Qualification
1	Johor Darul Ta'zim	6	4	1	1	16	4	+12	13	Advance to knockout phase
2	Selangor	6	3	1	2	11	11	0	10	Advance to knockout phase
3	Sarawak	6	1	2	3	6	12	−6	5	
4	Terengganu	6	0	4	2	6	12	−6	4	

Updated to match(es) played on 9 September 2017. Source: FAM FMLLP
4 July 2017
21:00 UTC+8

Johor Darul Ta'zim	4–0	Sarawak
Marcos António 12'; Guerra 27' (pen.), 73'; Insa 84'	Report

Tan Sri Dato' Haji Hassan Yunos Stadium, Larkin
Attendance: 13,285
Referee: Zohri Tajuddin
4 July 2017
21:00 UTC+8

Selangor	1–1	Terengganu
Rufino 43'	Report	Issey 64' (pen.)

Majlis Perbandaran Selayang Stadium, Selayang
Attendance: 2,951
Referee: Khirulazuan Kidam

7 July 2017
21:00 UTC+8

Terengganu	0–0	Johor Darul Ta'zim
	Report

Sultan Ismail Nasiruddin Shah Stadium, Kuala Terengganu
Attendance: 5,355
Referee: Fairuzi Mat Desa
8 July 2017
20:15 UTC+8

Sarawak	1–2	Selangor
Shreen 82'	Report	Forkey Doe 39'; Dzulazlan 64' (o.g.)

Sarawak State Stadium, Kuching
Attendance: 2,000
Referee: Fitri Maskon

18 July 2017
21:00 UTC+8

Selangor	3–2	Johor Darul Ta'zim
Fairuz 33'; Amri 35', 90' (pen.)	Report	Hazwan 56'; Darren 69'

Majlis Perbandaran Selayang Stadium, Selayang
Attendance: 10,219
Referee: Zohri Tajuddin
18 July 2017
20:15 UTC+8

Sarawak	0–0	Terengganu
	Report

Sarawak State Stadium, Kuching
Attendance: 761
Referee: Zulkarnain Zakaria

29 July 2017
20:15 UTC+8

Sarawak	0–2	Johor Darul Ta'zim
	Report	Ghaddar 41'; Safiq 76'

Sarawak State Stadium, Kuching
Attendance: 1,102
Referee: Fitri Maskon
29 July 2017
21:00 UTC+8

Terengganu	2–3	Selangor
Faruqi 24'; Tchétché 78'	Report	Forkey Doe 51'; Syahmi 56'; Rufino 90+2'

Sultan Ismail Nasiruddin Shah Stadium, Kuala Terengganu
Attendance: 7,150
Referee: Nagor Amir Noor Mohamed

1 August 2017
21:00 UTC+8

Johor Darul Ta'zim	5–0	Terengganu
Safawi 19' (pen.); Fadhli 38'; Kunanlan 45+2'; Hazwan 49'; Darren 80'	Report

Tan Sri Dato' Haji Hassan Yunos Stadium, Larkin
Attendance: 12,370
Referee: Zohri Tajuddin
2 August 2017
21:00 UTC+8

Selangor	1–2	Sarawak
Ukah 39'	Report	Roskam 52'; Raičković 65'

Majlis Perbandaran Selayang Stadium, Selayang
Attendance: 1,721
Referee: Amirul Izwan Yaacob

9 September 2017
21:00 UTC+8

Johor Darul Ta'zim	3–1	Selangor
Ghaddar 17', 75'; Gary 30'	Report	Rufino 28'

Tan Sri Dato' Haji Hassan Yunos Stadium, Larkin
Attendance: 15,930
Referee: Zohri Tajuddin
9 September 2017
21:00 UTC+8

Terengganu	3–3	Sarawak
Issey 26'; Tchétché 29', 43'	Report	Roskam 36'; Rahim 61'; Raičković 84'

Sultan Ismail Nasiruddin Shah Stadium, Kuala Terengganu
Attendance: 543
Referee: Fitri Maskon
