= Lucas Cano =

Argentine footballer

Personal information
- Full name: Lucas Matías Cano
- Date of birth: 9 May 1995 (age 31)
- Place of birth: José C. Paz, Argentina
- Height: 1.80 m (5 ft 11 in)
- Position: Striker

Team information
- Current team: Colón

Youth career
- Argentinos Juniors

Senior career*
Years	Team	Apps	(Gls)
2011–2017	Argentinos Juniors	38	(3)
2017	→ Felda United (loan)	11	(6)
2018	Deportes La Serena	27	(6)
2019–2020	Chacarita Juniors	27	(6)
2020–2022	San Martín Tucumán	43	(8)
2022–2023	Arsenal de Sarandí	13	(0)
2023–2024	Güemes	34	(9)
2024–2025	Sport Huancayo	33	(16)
2025–2026	Deportivo Táchira	35	(5)
2026–	Colón	4	(0)
- * Club domestic league appearances and goals as of 19:08, 20 March 2026 (UTC)

Lucas Matías Cano (born 9 May 1995) is an Argentine footballer who plays for Colón.

In 2017, Cano was loaned to Malaysian club Felda United for one-year deal. After a successful loan spell where he scored 6 times in 11 appearances for the Malaysian club, he was deemed surplus to requirements by Argentinos and was free transferred to Chilean club Deportes La Serena.

After a successful run as goalscorer for a number of South American teams, including spells in Chile and Argentina, for the 2024 season he signed with Peruvian team Sport Huancayo. 2024 was a stellar year for the striker as he notched 12 goals in his first 24 appearances for the club.

== Honours ==
Argentinos Juniors

- Primera B Nacional: 2016–17
