= Hasbullah Abu Bakar =

Malaysian footballer

Hasbullah
Personal information
- Full name: Mohamad Hasbullah bin Abu Bakar
- Date of birth: 26 October 1994 (age 32)
- Place of birth: Johor, Malaysia
- Height: 1.75 m (5 ft 9 in)
- Position: Central midfielder

Team information
- Current team: Melaka
- Number: 15

Youth career
- 2010–2013: Johor Darul Ta'zim

Senior career*
Years	Team	Apps	(Gls)
2014–2015	Johor Darul Ta'zim II	20	(1)
2016–2022	Johor Darul Ta'zim	3	(0)
2018	→ Johor Darul Ta'zim II (loan)	6	(0)
2021–2022	→ Melaka United (loan)	32	(1)
2023–2024	Negeri Sembilan FC	20	(0)
2025–2026	Penang	9	(0)
2026–	Melaka		
- * Club domestic league appearances and goals as of 7 January 2026

Mohamad Hasbullah bin Abu Bakar (born 26 October 1994) is a Malaysian footballer who currently playing for Malaysia Super League club Melaka.

== Club career ==
=== Johor Darul Ta'zim ===
Hasbullah is a product of the Johor Football Association. He penned a youth contract with Malaysian Super League outfit Johor FC in 2012. For 2013 season, Hasbullah played for Malaysia Premier League side Johor FA.

Hasbullah had been promoted to Johor Darul Ta'zim's first team after his amazing performance at Johor Darul Ta'zim II.

=== Negeri Sembilan ===
He was officially announced as a new Negeri Sembilan FC player on 13 January 2023.

=== Penang ===
On 9 June 2025, Hasbullah signed for Malaysia Super League club Penang from Kedah Darul Aman on free transfer.

== Honours ==
=== Club ===
Johor Darul Ta'zim

- Malaysia Super League: 2017, 2019
- Malaysia Cup: 2017
- Malaysia Charity Shield (1): 2019

Penang

- MFL Challenge Cup runner-up: 2026
