= 2017 Malaysia Cup =

2017 TM Malaysia Cup
TM Piala Malaysia 2017

Tournament details
- Country: Malaysia
- Teams: 16

Final positions
- Champions: Johor Darul Ta'zim (1st title)
- Runners-up: Kedah

Tournament statistics
- Matches played: 61
- Goals scored: 201 (3.3 per match)
- Top goal scorer: Sandro (9 goals)

Awards
- Best player: Gonzalo Cabrera

The 2017 Malaysia Cup (Malay: Piala Malaysia 2017) was the 91st edition of the Malaysia Cup tournament organised by Football Association of Malaysia.

The 2017 Malaysia Cup began on August with a preliminary round. A total of 16 teams took part in the competition. The teams were divided into four groups, each containing four teams. The group leaders and runners-up teams in the groups after six matches qualified to the quarterfinals.

Kedah were the defending champions.

The final was played at the Shah Alam Stadium in Shah Alam on 4 November 2017. It was the eleventh time that final has been held in Shah Alam, Selangor. The final was contested by the defending champions, Kedah, and Johor Darul Ta'zim. Johor Darul Ta'zim won the match 2–0, with goals from Aidil Zafuan and Gonzalo Cabrera. With that win, Johor Darul Ta'zim secured their second trophy of the 2017 season after successfully retaining the Super League title.

== Format ==
In the competition, the top eleven teams from the First Round of 2017 Malaysia Super League were joined by the top five teams from the First Round of 2017 Malaysia Premier League. The teams were drawn into four groups of four teams.

== Number of teams by states ==
Number	State	Team(s)
3	Selangor	Selangor, PKNS and UiTM
2	Pahang	Pahang and Felda United
2	Perak	Perak and PKNP
2	Terengganu	Terengganu and T–Team
1	Johor	Johor Darul Ta'zim
1	Kedah	Kedah
1	Kelantan	Kelantan
1	Kuala Lumpur	Kuala Lumpur
1	Melaka	Melaka United
1	Negeri Sembilan	Negeri Sembilan
1	Sarawak	Sarawak

== Round and draw dates ==
The draw for the 2017 Malaysia Cup was held on 22 May 2017 at Sri Pentas, Persiaran Bandar Utama, Petaling Jaya on live telecast Scoreboard Extra Time with the participating team coaches and captains in attendance.

Phase	Round	Draw date	First leg	Second leg
Group stage	Matchday 1	22 May 2017; 22:30 UTC+8	4 July 2017	
Group stage	Matchday 2	22 May 2017; 22:30 UTC+8	7–8 July 2017	
Group stage	Matchday 3	22 May 2017; 22:30 UTC+8	18 July 2017	
Group stage	Matchday 4	22 May 2017; 22:30 UTC+8	29 July 2017	
Group stage	Matchday 5	22 May 2017; 22:30 UTC+8	1–2 August 2017	
Group stage	Matchday 6	22 May 2017; 22:30 UTC+8	9 September 2017	
Knockout stage	Quarter-finals	22 May 2017; 22:30 UTC+8	15–16 September 2017	24 September 2017
Knockout stage	Semi-finals	22 May 2017; 22:30 UTC+8	15 October 2017	21 October 2017
Knockout stage	Final	22 May 2017; 22:30 UTC+8	4 November 2017 at Shah Alam Stadium, Shah Alam, Selangor	

== Seeding ==
Pot 1	Pot 2	Pot 3	Pot 4
1. Johor Darul Ta'zim; 2. Pahang; 3. Kedah; 4. Perak	5. Selangor; 6. (Pahang) FELDA United; 7. Kelantan; 8. (Terengganu) T-Team	9. (Selangor) PKNS; 10. (Malacca) Melaka United; 11. Sarawak; 12. Negeri Sembilan	13. Terengganu; 14. (Perak) PKNP; 15. Kuala Lumpur; 16. (Selangor) UiTM

== Group stage ==
=== Group A ===
Pos	Team	Pld	W	D	L	GF	GA	GD	Pts	Qualification	PKNP	PHG	NSL	TTM
1	(Perak) PKNP	6	3	2	1	9	9	0	11	Advance to knockout phase	—	1–1	2–0	4–1
2	Pahang	6	2	3	1	14	8	+6	9	Advance to knockout phase	6–0	—	2–2	3–2
3	Negeri Sembilan	6	1	3	2	8	12	−4	6		0–0	2–1	—	3–3
4	(Terengganu) T–Team	6	1	2	3	12	14	−2	5		1–2	1–1	4–1	—

Updated to match(es) played on 9 September 2017. Source: FAM FMLLP

=== Group B ===
Pos	Team	Pld	W	D	L	GF	GA	GD	Pts	Qualification	PRK	FLDU	KUL	PKNS
1	Perak	6	5	1	0	13	3	+10	16	Advance to knockout phase	—	2–1	2–0	2–0
2	(Pahang) FELDA United	6	3	2	1	11	7	+4	11	Advance to knockout phase	1–1	—	0–0	3–2
3	Kuala Lumpur	6	1	2	3	3	9	−6	5		0–3	1–4	—	2–0
4	(Selangor) PKNS	6	0	1	5	4	12	−8	1		1–3	1–2	0–0	—

Updated to match(es) played on 9 September 2017. Source: FAM FMLLP

=== Group C ===
Pos	Team	Pld	W	D	L	GF	GA	GD	Pts	Qualification	KDH	MLK	KLT	UITM
1	Kedah	6	5	0	1	17	5	+12	15	Advance to knockout phase	—	2–0	2–0	1–0
2	(Malacca) Melaka United	6	3	0	3	13	16	−3	9	Advance to knockout phase	2–6	—	3–0	2–1
3	Kelantan	6	2	0	4	8	12	−4	6		3–1	2–3	—	3–1
4	(Selangor) UiTM	6	2	0	4	9	14	−5	6		0–5	5–3	2–0	—

Updated to match(es) played on 9 September 2017. Source: FAM FMLLP

=== Group D ===
Pos	Team	Pld	W	D	L	GF	GA	GD	Pts	Qualification	JDT	SGR	SWK	TRG
1	Johor Darul Ta'zim	6	4	1	1	16	4	+12	13	Advance to knockout phase	—	3–1	4–0	5–0
2	Selangor	6	3	1	2	11	11	0	10	Advance to knockout phase	3–2	—	1–2	1–1
3	Sarawak	6	1	2	3	6	12	−6	5		0–2	1–2	—	0–0
4	Terengganu	6	0	4	2	6	12	−6	4		0–0	2–3	3–3	—

Updated to match(es) played on 9 September 2017. Source: FAM FMLLP

== Knockout stage ==
In the knockout stage, teams played against each other over two legs on a home-and-away basis, except for the one-match final. The mechanism of the draws for each round was as follows:

- In the draw for the quarter final, the fourth group winners were seeded, and the fourth group runners-up were unseeded. The seeded teams were drawn against the unseeded teams, with the seeded teams hosting the second leg. Teams from the same group or the same association could not be drawn against each other.
- In the draws for the quarter-finals onwards, there were no seedings, and teams from the same group or the same association could be drawn against each other.

=== Bracket ===
Quarter-finals
B2	(Pahang) FELDA United	1	4	5
A1	(Perak) PKNP	3	1	4
D2	Selangor	2	0	2
C1	Kedah	3	1	4
A2	Pahang	3	0	3
B1	Perak	1	4	5
C2	(Malacca) Melaka United	1	1	2
D1	Johor Darul Ta'zim	4	1	5

Semi-finals
(Pahang) FELDA United	1	0	1
Kedah	1	2	3
Perak	1	0	1
Johor Darul Ta'zim	1	3	4

Final
Kedah	0
Johor Darul Ta'zim	2

=== Quarter-finals ===
The first legs were played on 15 & 16 September 2017, and the second legs were played on 24 September 2017.

Team 1	Agg.	Team 2	1st leg	2nd leg
FELDA United (Pahang)	5–4	(Perak) PKNP	1–3	4–1
Selangor	2–4	Kedah	2–3	0–1
Melaka United (Malacca)	2–5	Johor Darul Ta'zim	1–4	1–1
Pahang	3–5	Perak	3–1	0–4

=== Semi-finals ===
The first legs were played on 15 October 2017, and the second legs were played on 21 October 2017.

Team 1	Agg.	Team 2	1st leg	2nd leg
FELDA United (Pahang)	1–3	Kedah	1–1	0–2
Perak	1–4	Johor Darul Ta'zim	1–1	0–3

=== Final ===
The final were played on 4 November 2017 at the Shah Alam Stadium in Shah Alam.

4 November 2017
21:20 UTC+8

Kedah	0–2	Johor Darul Ta'zim
	Report	Aidil 3'; Cabrera 63'

Shah Alam Stadium, Shah Alam
Attendance: 79,740
Referee: Razlan Jeffri Ali

== Statistics ==
=== Top goalscorers ===
As of 4 November 2017

Rank	Player	Club	Goals
1	(Brazil) Sandro	Kedah	9
2	(Brazil) Gilmar	Perak	8
3	(Nigeria) Akanni-Sunday	UiTM	7
4	(Lebanon) Mohammed Ghaddar	Johor Darul Ta'zim	6
4	(Malaysia) Shahrel Fikri	PKNP	6
6	(Denmark) Ken Ilsø	Kedah	5
6	(Brazil) Matheus Alves	Pahang	5
6	(Spain) Rufino Segovia	Selangor	5
9	(Brazil) Thiago Fernandes	FELDA United	4
9	(Nigeria) Ifedayo Olusegun	FELDA United	4

=== Own goals ===
Rank	Player	For	Club	Date	Own goal
1	(Malaysia) Afif Amiruddin	PKNP	Pahang	7 July 2017	1
1	(Malaysia) Faiz Bandong	Kedah	UiTM	7 July 2017	1
1	(Malaysia) Annas Rahmat	T–Team	Negeri Sembilan	7 July 2017	1
1	(Malaysia) Dzulazlan Ibrahim	Selangor	Sarawak	8 July 2017	1
1	(Malaysia) Hasbullah Abu Bakar	Perak	Johor Darul Ta'zim	15 October 2017	1

=== Clean sheets ===
As of matches played on 4 November 2017

Rank	Player	Club	Clean sheets
1	(Malaysia) Izham Tarmizi	Johor Darul Ta'zim	4
1	(Malaysia) Ifwat Akmal	Kedah	4
3	(Malaysia) Hafizul Hakim	Perak	3
4	(Malaysia) Haziq Nadzli	Johor Darul Ta'zim	2
4	(Malaysia) Abdul Hadi Hamid	Kedah	2
4	(Malaysia) Kamarul Effandi	Kuala Lumpur	2
4	(Malaysia) Suffian Abdul Rahman	Terengganu	2
8	12 players		1

=== Hat-tricks ===
Player	Club	Against	Result	Date
(Brazil) Thiago Fernandes	FELDA United	Kuala Lumpur	1–4	29 July 2017
(Nigeria) Akanni-Sunday	UiTM	Melaka United	5–3	9 September 2017
(Malaysia) Shahrel Fikri	PKNP	FELDA United	1–3	15 September 2017
