= Larkin, Johor =

Larkin Larkin
- Township
- Interactive map of Larkin
- Coordinates: 1°29′24″N 103°42′20″E
- Country: Malaysia
- State: Johor
- District: Johor Bahru
- City: Johor Bahru
- Time zone: UTC+8 (MST)
- Postal code: 80350
- Dialling code: +607

Larkin is a suburb in Johor Bahru, Johor, Malaysia.

== Geography ==
The suburb spans over an area of 12.3 km^{2}.

== Shopping ==
MB Point - Larkin Perdana (2017)

Plaza Larkin, Larkin Perdana, Terminal Larkin Sentral, Dataran Larkin, Larkin Junction

== Education ==
- Kolej Vokasional (ERT) Azizah
- Kolej Vokasional Perdagangan Johor Bahru
- Sekolah Menengah Kebangsaan St Joseph (B)
- Sekolah Menengah Kebangsaan Tasek Utara
- Sekolah Menengah Kebangsaan Tasek Utara 2
- Sekolah Menengah Teknik Johor Bahru
- Sekolah Rendah Islam Husni Amal
- Sekolah Agama Dato' Onn Jaafar
- Sekolah Jenis Kebangsaan (Cina) Foon Yew 3
- Sekolah Jenis Kebangsaan (Cina) Foon Yew 4
- Sekolah Kebangsaan Larkin 1
- Sekolah Kebangsaan Larkin 2
- Sekolah Kebangsaan Tanjung Puteri

== Tourist attractions ==
- Tan Sri Dato' Haji Hassan Yunos Stadium

== Transportation ==
- Larkin Sentral
