= Khirulazuan Kidam =

Malaysian football referee

- Full name: Khirulazuan bin Kidam
- Born: Malaysia

Domestic
Years	League	Role
2016–	Malaysia Super League	Referee

Khirulazuan bin Kidam is a Malaysian football referee.

== Career ==
Khirulazuan became a professional referee in 2016 and has been a Super League referee since 2016. He has refereed 7 matches in Super League, 5 matches in FA Cup and two Malaysia Cup matches as of 2016.

Khirulazuan debut professional domestic match as a referee was a FA Cup match between Megah Murni FC and MISC-MIFA at the Selayang Stadium in Selayang on 2 February 2016.

Khirulazuan had been very terrible at his career as a referee. He has been suspended two times and had been demoted to the lowest league, Kelantan FA once reject and refuse Khirulazuan even before the game started.
