= Suhaimi Mat Hassan =

Malaysian professional football referee (born 1976)

- Full name: Suhaimi bin Mat Hassan
- Born: 24 June 1976 (age 50); FELDA Mempaga, Bentong, Pahang, Malaysia

Domestic
Years	League	Role
2011–	Malaysia Super League	Referee
2011–	Malaysia Premier League	Referee

International
Years	League	Role
2010–	FIFA listed	Referee

Suhaimi Mat Hassan (born 24 June 1976 in FELDA Mempaga, Bentong, Pahang, Malaysia) is a Malaysian professional football referee. He has been a full international for FIFA since 2010.

He refereed in five editions of FIFA Beach Soccer World Cup, namely Italy 2011, Tahiti 2013, Portugal 2015, Paraguay 2019, and Russia 2021. For the 2021 editions, he refereed the final between Russia and Japan.
