= 2020 Pahang FA season =

16th season in the Malaysian Super League

Pahang
2020 season
- President: Tengku Abdul Rahman Ibni Sultan Ahmad Shah
- Manager: Suffian Awang
- Head coach: Dollah Salleh
- Stadium: Darul Makmur Stadium
- Malaysia Super League: 8th
- Malaysia FA Cup: Cancelled
- Malaysia Cup: Cancelled
- Top goalscorer: League: Ivan Carlos (6 goals); All: Ivan Carlos (6 goals)
Home colours	Away colours	Third colours

The 2020 season was Pahang's 17th season in the Malaysia Super League since its inception in 2004.

== Management team ==
Position	Name
Head coach	(Malaysia) Dollah Salleh
Assistant head coach	(Malaysia) Shaharuddin Rosdi
Assistant coaches	(Malaysia) Jalaluddin Jaafar
Assistant coaches	(Malaysia) Shahrulnizam Sahat
Goalkeeper coach	(Malaysia) Muadzar Mohamad
Fitness coaches	(Malaysia) Mohd Hafiz Tajudin
Fitness coaches	(Malaysia) Abdul Rahim Kadir Ku Jambu

== Squad ==
As of 26 November 2018.

No.	Name	Nat.	Date of birth (age)	Last club	Since	Ends
Goalkeepers
1	Helmi Eliza	(Malaysia)	20 January 1983 (age 43)	(Malaysia) Negeri Sembilan	2016	
18	Daniel Wafiuddin	(Malaysia)	16 March 1997 (age 29)	(Malaysia) UKM F.C.	2020	
25	Sharbinee Allawee	(Malaysia)	7 December 1986 (age 39)	(Malaysia) Kuala Lumpur FA	2020	
Defenders
3	Hérold Goulon	(France)	12 June 1988 (age 37)	(Cyprus) Ermis Aradippou	2019	
4	Dinesh Rajasingam	(Malaysia)	13 February 1998 (age 28)	(Malaysia) Harimau Muda C	2016	
5	Bunyamin Umar	(Malaysia)	7 January 1988 (age 38)	(Malaysia) Selangor	2018	
6	Mohd Hazri Rozali	(Malaysia)	26 June 1986 (age 39)	(Malaysia) Melaka United	2017	
13	Ashar Al Aafiz	(Malaysia)	28 March 1995 (age 31)	Youth Team	2016	
14	Faisal Rosli	(Malaysia)	21 January 1991 (age 35)	(Malaysia) Shahzan Muda	2017	
22	Fazly Mazlan	(Malaysia)	22 December 1993 (age 32)	(Malaysia) Johor Darul Ta'zim II F.C.	2020	2020
24	Muslim Ahmad	(Malaysia)	25 April 1989 (age 36)	(Malaysia) Kelantan	2017	
Midfielders
6	Adam Reed	(Philippines) (England)	8 May 1991 (age 34)	(Thailand) Chainat Hornbill F.C.	2020	
7	Faisal Halim	(Malaysia)	7 January 1998 (age 28)	(Malaysia) Penang	2016	
17	Zuhair Aizat	(Malaysia)	1 October 1996 (age 29)	Youth team	2018	
19	Sharul Nizam	(Malaysia)	15 June 1996 (age 29)	Youth team	2018	
20	Azam Azih	(Malaysia)	3 January 1995 (age 31)	(Malaysia) Harimau Muda B	2015	
29	Nik Sharif Haseefy	(Malaysia)	13 May 1997 (age 28)	Youth Team	2019	
	Hardee Samsuri	(Malaysia)	4 June 1994 (age 31)	(Malaysia) UiTM F.C.	2020	
Forwards
10	Dickson Nwakaeme	(Nigeria)	21 April 1986 (age 39)	(France) Angers	2019	
11	Ivan Carlos	(Brazil)	6 December 1989 (age 36)	(Cyprus) AEL Limassol	2020	
12	S.Kumaahran	(Malaysia)	3 July 1996 (age 29)	(Malaysia) Johor Darul Ta'zim II F.C.	2020	2020
42	Gopi Rizqi	(Malaysia)	15 December 1989 (age 36)	(Malaysia) PDRM FA	2020	2020
Players who have left the club in mid season
2	Khalil Khamis	(Lebanon)	12 January 1995 (age 31)	(Lebanon) Al Ahed FC	2020	
26	Mohamadou Sumareh	(Malaysia) (The Gambia)	20 September 1994 (age 31)	(Malaysia) Perlis	2017	

== Transfers ==
=== In ===
1st leg

Pos.	Name	From	Fee	Ref.
GK	(Malaysia) Sharbinee Allawee	(Malaysia) Kuala Lumpur FA	Free	
GK	(Malaysia) Daniel Wafiuddin	(Malaysia) UKM F.C.	Free	
DF	(Malaysia) Fazly Mazlan	(Malaysia) Johor Darul Ta'zim II F.C.	Season loan	
DF	(Lebanon) Khalil Khamis	(Lebanon) Al Ahed FC	Season loan	
MF	(England) (Philippines) Adam Reed	(Thailand) Chainat Hornbill F.C.	Free	
MF	(Malaysia) Hardee Samsuri	(Malaysia) UiTM F.C.		
FW	(Brazil) Ivan Carlos	(Cyprus) AEL Limassol	Free	
FW	(Malaysia) S.Kumaahran	(Malaysia) Johor Darul Ta'zim II F.C.	Season loan	

=== Out ===
1st Leg

Pos.	Name	To	Fee	Ref.
GK	(Malaysia) Wafieyuddin Shamsudin		Free	
GK	(Malaysia) Remezey Che Ros		Free	
DF	(Malaysia) Zubir Azmi	(Malaysia) Sabah FA	Free	
DF	(Malaysia) Afif Amiruddin		Free	
DF	(Singapore) Safuwan Baharudin	(Malaysia) Selangor FA	Free	
DF	(Malaysia) (Australia) Matthew Davies	(Malaysia) Johor Darul Ta'zim F.C.	Undisclosed	
MF	(Indonesia) Saddil Ramdani	(Indonesia) Bhayangkara F.C.	Free	
MF	(Malaysia) Wan Zaharulnizam	(Malaysia) Kelantan FA	Free	
FW	(Malaysia) Norshahrul Idlan	(Thailand) BG Pathum United F.C.	Free	
FW	(Malaysia) Kogileswaran Raj	(Malaysia) Petaling Jaya City FC	Free	
FW	(Namibia) Lazarus Kaimbi	(Malaysia) Kelantan FA	Free	

2nd Leg

Pos.	Name	To	Fee	Ref.
FW	(Malaysia) (The Gambia) Mohamadou Sumareh		Free	
DF	(Lebanon) Khalil Khamis	(Lebanon) Al Ahed FC	Loan Return	

=== Retained ===
Pos.	Name	Ref.
GK	(Malaysia) Helmi Eliza	
DF	(Malaysia) Bunyamin Umar	
DF	(Malaysia) Muslim Ahmad	
DF	(Malaysia) Mohd Hazri Rozali	
DF	(Malaysia) Ashar Al Aafiz	
DF	(Malaysia) Faisal Rosli	
DF	(Malaysia) Dinesh Rajasingam	
DF	(France) Hérold Goulon	2 years contract signed in 2019
MF	(Malaysia) Nik Sharif Haseefy	
MF	(Malaysia) Shahrul Nizam	
FW	(Malaysia) Faisal Halim	
FW	(Nigeria) Dickson Nwakaeme	

== Friendlies ==
=== Pre Season ===
Win Draw Loss

23 January 2019 1	Ultimate FC (Malaysia)	0-4	(Malaysia) Pahang FA	IGB International School
			Francis Doe; Zuhair Aizat; Faisal Halim; Nik Sharif Haseefy

29 January 2019 2	UiTM FC (Malaysia)	1-3	(Malaysia) Pahang FA	IGB International School

11 February 2019 3	Negeri Sembilan FA (Malaysia)	0-2	(Malaysia) Pahang FA	Darul Makmur Stadium
			Bunyamin Umar; Adam Reed

13 February 2019 4	UKM FC (Malaysia)	1-1	(Malaysia) Pahang FA	Darul Makmur Stadium

18 February 2020 5	Terengganu F.C. I (Malaysia)	4-1	(Malaysia) Pahang FA	Terengganu
	Dominique Da Sylva; Faris Ramli			Stadium: Sultan Ismail Nasiruddin Shah Stadium

21 February 2020 6	Pahang FA (Malaysia)	3-1	(Malaysia) Kuala Lumpur FA	Pahang
	Ivan Carlo o.g.' Nik Shariff			Stadium: Darul Makmur Stadium

=== Mid Season ===
Win Draw Loss

7 August 2020 1	Pahang FA (Malaysia)	0-3	(Malaysia) Terengganu F.C. II	Pahang
			Bruno Suzuki; Engku Shakir; Qairul Ikhwan	Stadium: Darul Makmur Stadium

12 August 2020 2	Selangor II (Malaysia)	3-2	(Malaysia) Pahang FA	Selangor
				Stadium: FAS Training Center

== Competitions ==
=== Malaysia Super League ===
==== League table ====
Pos	Team	Pld	W	D	L	GF	GA	GD	Pts
6	UiTM	11	5	2	4	17	15	+2	17
7	Petaling Jaya City	11	3	5	3	17	16	+1	14
8	Pahang	11	4	2	5	18	18	0	14
9	Melaka United	11	4	2	5	13	16	−3	11 (Note: Melaka have been docked three points following the decision from FAM.)
10	Sabah	11	2	3	6	12	24	−12	9

Source: Malaysian Football League
Rules for classification: 1) Points; 2) Goal difference; 3) Number of goals scored.

==== Matches ====
29 February 2020 1	Pahang	1-2	Selangor	Kuantan
21:00 UTC+8	Ivan Carlos 20' (yellow card) 76'	Report	Ifedayo Olusegun 27'; Brendan Gan 89'; Syazwan Zainon (yellow card) 57'; Sandro Da Silva (yellow card) 84'	Stadium: Darul Makmur Stadium; Referee: Hamdan Awang

6 March 2020 2	Petaling Jaya City FC	3-2	Pahang	Petaling Jaya
21:00 UTC+8	Demba Camara 12'; R. Barathkumar 60'; Kogileswaran Raj 90+6'; R. Aroon Kumar (yellow card) 13'; K. Gurusamy (yellow card) 87'	Report	Dickson Nwakaeme 16' (pen.); Ivan Carlos 52'; Khalil Khamis (yellow card) 90+4'	Stadium: Petaling Jaya Stadium; Referee: Nazmi Nasaruddin

10 March 2020 3	Pahang	2-0	Sabah	Kuantan
21:00 UTC+8	Ivan Carlos 20' (yellow card) 60'; Herold Goulon 50' (pen.)	Report	Zubir Azmi (yellow card) 30'	Stadium: Darul Makmur Stadium; Referee: Tuan Yaasin

14 March 2020 4	Melaka United	0-1	Pahang	Malacca
21:00 UTC+8	Romel Morales (yellow card) 45'; Saiful Ridzuwan (yellow card) 45+4'; Faris Shah Rosli (yellow card) 50'	Report	Dickson Nwakaeme 67'	Stadium: Hang Jebat Stadium; Referee: Razlan Joffri Ali

28 August 2020 5 (Note: The match is postponed following the coronavirus pandemic.)	Pahang	2-3	Johor Darul Ta'zim	Kuantan
	Faisal Halim 40'; Herold Goulon 45'; Muslim Ahmad (yellow card) 37'; Gopi Rizqi (yellow card) 37'; Dinesh Rajasingam (yellow card) 38'; Ashar Al Aafiz (yellow card) 90'	Report	Leandro Velazquez 5'; Ramadhan Saifullah 14'; Gonzalo Cabrera 35' (pen.) (yellow card) 22'; Nazmi Faiz (yellow card) 73'; Maurício (yellow card) 53'	Stadium: Darul Makmur Stadium

5 September 2020 6	UiTM FC	1-0	Pahang	Shah Alam
21:00 UTC+8	Rafie Yacoob 64'; Faizal Arif (yellow card) 78'; Rabih Ataya (yellow card) 90+1'	Report	Gopi Rizqi (yellow card) 19'; Adam Tull (yellow card) 84'	Stadium: UiTM Stadium; Referee: Mohd Amirul Izwan Yaacob

12 September 2020 7	Pahang	2-0	PDRM FA	Kuantan
	Ivan Carlos 37'; Faisal Halim 74'; Nik Sharif Haseefy (yellow card) 31'	Report		Stadium: Darul Makmur Stadium; Referee: Zamzaidi Katimin

20 September 2020 8	Felda United	2-2	Pahang	Jengka
21:00 UTC+8	Nikola Raspopovic 38'; Haiqal Azhar 45+2' (pen.); Jasazrin Jamaludin (yellow card) 45+4' (yellow-red card) 82'; Fadhil Idris (yellow card) 73'; Osman Yusoff (yellow card) 90+5'	Report	Muslim Ahmad 14'; Ivan Carlos 79' (pen.); Gopi Rizqi (yellow card) 45+4'	Stadium: Tun Abdul Razak Stadium; Referee: Hamdan Bin Awang

26 September 2020 9	Pahang	2-1	Kedah	Kuantan
21:00 UTC+8	Adam Reed 41'; Nik Sharif Haseefy 46'; Herold Goulon (yellow card) 28'; Fazly Mazlan (yellow card) 69'	Report	Kipré Tchétché 15'; Kpah Sherman (yellow card) 45'; Norfiqrie Talib (yellow card) 65'	Stadium: Darul Makmur Stadium; Referee: Razlan Joffri Ali

3 October 2020 10	Pahang	3-3	Perak	Kuantan
21:00 UTC+8	Dinesh Rajasingam 8'; Nik Sharif Haseefy 27'; Ivan Carlos 41' (red card) 53'; Ashar Al Aafiz (yellow card) 32'; Helmi Eliza (yellow card) 69'; Herold Goulon (yellow card) 90+6'	Report	J. Partiban 47' 90+2'; Shahrel Fikri 84' (yellow card) 43'; Anthony Golec (yellow card) 19'; Firdaus Saiyadi (yellow card) 53'; Leandro Dos Santos (yellow card) 55'; Shahrul Saad (yellow card) 62'	Stadium: Darul Makmur Stadium; Referee: Mohd Nafeez Abdul Wahab

10 October 2020 11	Terengganu F.C. I	2-1	Pahang	Terengganu
21:00 UTC+8	Dominique Da Sylva 16' (pen.); Lee Tuck 82'; Argzim Redzovic (yellow card) 23'; Azalinullah Alias (yellow card) 61'	Report	Nik Sharif Haseefy 13'; S. Kumaahran (yellow card) 42'; Helmi Eliza (yellow card) 45'	Stadium: Sultan Ismail Nasiruddin Shah Stadium; Referee: Nazmi Nasaruddin

=== Malaysia Cup ===
6 November 2020 Round 1	Kedah	3-2	Pahang FA	Alor Setar
21:00 UTC+8	Shakir Hamzah 17'; Kpah Sherman 35'; Kipré Tchétché 43'; Renan Alves (yellow card) 78'; Alif Yusof (yellow card) 90'	Report	Muslim Ahmad 49' (yellow card) 88'; Faizal Abd Rani 88'; Dickson Nwakaeme (penalty missed) 79	Stadium: Darul Aman Stadium; Referee: Nazmi Nasaruddin

== Statistics ==
=== Appearances and goals ===
No.	Pos.	Name	League		FA Cup		Malaysia Cup		Total	
No.	Pos.	Name	Apps	Goals	Apps	Goals	Apps	Goals	Apps	Goals
1	GK	(Malaysia) Helmi Eliza	6	0	0	0	1	0	1	0
3	DF	(France) Herold Goulon	9	2	0	0	1	0	1	0
4	DF	(Malaysia) R. Dinesh	5(2)	1	0	0	0(1)	0	1	0
5	DF	(Malaysia) Bunyamin Umar	0(2)	0	0	0	0	0	1	0
6	MF	(Philippines) (England) Adam Reed	11	1	0	0	1	0	1	0
7	MF	(Malaysia) Faisal Halim	11	1	0	0	1	0	1	0
8	MF	(Malaysia) Nik Sharif Haseefy	5(4)	3	0	0	1	0	1	0
10	FW	(Nigeria) Dickson Nwakaeme	4(3)	2	0	0	1	0	1	0
11	FW	(Brazil) Ivan Carlos	8(1)	5	0	0	1	0	1	1
12	FW	(Malaysia) S.Kumaahran	9(1)	0	0	0	1	0	1	0
13	DF	(Malaysia) Ashar Al Aafiz	4(3)	0	0	0	0	0	1	0
14	DF	(Malaysia) Faisal Rosli	3(3)	0	0	0	0	0	1	0
15	DF	(Malaysia) Hardee Shamsuri	0(2)	0	0	0	0	0	0	0
17	MF	(Malaysia) Zuhair Aizat	1	0	0	0	0	0	1	0
19	MF	(Malaysia) Sharul Nizam	1(3)	0	0	0	0	0	1	0
20	MF	(Malaysia) Azam Azih	11	0	0	0	1	0	1	0
21	DF	(Malaysia) Faizal Abd Rani	0	0	0	0	0(1)	1	0	0
22	DF	(Malaysia) Fazly Mazlan	9(1)	0	0	0	1	0	1	0
23	DF	(Malaysia) Izzat Che Awang	0(2)	0	0	0	0	0	0	0
24	DF	(Malaysia) Muslim Ahmad	8(1)	1	0	0	1	1	1	0
25	GK	(Malaysia) Sharbinee Allawee	4	0	0	0	0	0	1	0
27	DF	(Malaysia) Arisazri Juhari	0(1)	0	0	0	0	0	1	0
42	MF	(Malaysia) Gopi Rizqi	7(2)	0	0	0	0	0	1	0
Players who have played this season but had left the club or on loan to other club
2	DF	(Lebanon) Khalil Khamis	4	0	0	0	0	0	4	0
26	MF	(Malaysia) (The Gambia) Mohamadou Sumareh	2(1)	0	0	0	0	0	3	0
