= 2019 Pahang FA season =

16th season in the Malaysian Super League

Pahang
2019 season
- President: Tengku Abdul Rahman Ibni Sultan Ahmad Shah
- Manager: Suffian Awang
- Head coach: Dollah Salleh
- Stadium: Darul Makmur Stadium
- Super League: 2nd
- FA Cup: Semi-finals
- Malaysia Cup: Semi-finals
- Top goalscorer: League: Hérold Goulon (8 goals); All: Hérold Goulon; Dickson Nwakaeme (10 goals)
Home colours	Away colours	Third colours

The 2019 season was Pahang's 16th season in the Malaysian Super League since its inception in 2004.

== Management team ==
Position	Name
Head coach	(Malaysia) Dollah Salleh
Assistant head coach	(Malaysia) Shaharuddin Rosdi
Assistant coaches	(Malaysia) Jalaluddin Jaafar
Assistant coaches	(Malaysia) Shahrulnizam Sahat
Goalkeeper coach	(Malaysia) Muadzar Mohamad
Fitness coaches	(Malaysia) Mohd Hafiz Tajudin
Fitness coaches	(Malaysia) Abdul Rahim Kadir Ku Jambu

== Squad ==
As of 26 November 2018.

No.	Name	Nat.	Date of birth (age)	Signed from	Since	Ends
Goalkeepers
1	Helmi Eliza	(Malaysia)	20 January 1983 (age 43)	Negeri Sembilan	2016	
22	Remezey Che Ros	(Malaysia)	6 September 1982 (age 44)	Kuala Lumpur	2018	
27	Wafieyuddin Shamsudin	(Malaysia)	10 June 1989 (age 37)	Shahzan Muda		
Defenders
2	Matthew Davies	(Malaysia)	7 February 1995 (age 31)	Perth Glory	2015	
3	Hérold Goulon	(France)	12 June 1988 (age 38)	Ermis Aradippou	2019	
4	Dinesh Rajasingam	(Malaysia)	13 February 1998 (age 28)	Harimau Muda C	2016	
6	Mohd Hazri Rozali	(Malaysia)	26 June 1986 (age 40)	Melaka United	2017	
12	Bunyamin Umar	(Malaysia)	7 January 1988 (age 38)	Selangor	2018	
14	Faisal Rosli	(Malaysia)	21 January 1991 (age 35)	Shahzan Muda	2017	
16	Zubir Azmi	(Malaysia)	14 November 1996 (age 30)	Terengganu	2017	
19	Afif Amiruddin	(Malaysia)	22 March 1984 (age 42)	Perlis	2017	
24	Muslim Ahmad	(Malaysia)	25 April 1989 (age 37)	Kelantan	2017	
30	Ashar Al Aafiz	(Malaysia)	28 March 1995 (age 31)	Youth team	2016	
Midfielders
8	Wan Zaharulnizam	(Malaysia)	8 May 1991 (age 35)	Kelantan	2017	
15	Saddil Ramdani	(Indonesia)	2 January 1999 (age 27)	Persela Lamongan	2019	2020
17	Zuhair Aizat	(Malaysia)	1 October 1996 (age 30)	Youth team	2018	
18	Sharul Nizam	(Malaysia)	15 June 1996 (age 30)	Youth team	2018	
20	Azam Azih	(Malaysia)	3 January 1995 (age 31)	Harimau Muda B	2015	
21	Safuwan Baharudin	(Singapore)	22 September 1991 (age 35)	PDRM	2018	2020
26	Mohamadou Sumareh	(Malaysia)	20 September 1994 (age 32)	Perlis	2017	
29	Nik Sharif Haseefy	(Malaysia)	13 May 1997 (age 29)	Youth Team	2019	
Forwards
7	Faisal Halim	(Malaysia)	7 January 1998 (age 28)	Penang	2016	
9	Norshahrul Idlan	(Malaysia)	8 June 1986 (age 40)	Felda United	2018	
10	Dickson Nwakaeme	(Nigeria)	21 April 1986 (age 40)	Angers	2019	
11	Lazarus Kaimbi	(Namibia)	29 October 1987 (age 39)	Unattached	2019	
28	Kogileswaran Raj	(Malaysia)	12 August 1998 (age 28)	Harimau Muda C	2016	

== Transfers ==
=== In ===
1st leg

Pos.	Name	From	Fee	Ref.
DF	(France) Hérold Goulon	(Cyprus) Ermis Aradippou	Free	
MF	(Indonesia) Saddil Ramdani	(Indonesia) Persela Lamongan	Free	
FW	(Nigeria) Dickson Nwakaeme	(France) Angers SCO	Free	
FW	(Brazil) Zé Eduardo	(Brazil) Oeste Futebol Clube	Free	
MF	(Malaysia) Nik Sharif Haseefy	Youth team	Free	

2nd leg

Pos.	Name	From	Fee	Ref.
FW	(Namibia) Lazarus Kaimbi	Unattached		

=== Out ===
1st leg

Pos.	Name	To	Fee	Ref.
FW	(Brazil) Patrick Cruz	(Thailand) Chonburi	Free	
FW	(Nigeria) Austin Amutu	(Egypt) Al-Masry	Free	
FW	(Canada) Issey Nakajima-Farran	(Canada) Pacific FC	Free	

2nd leg

Pos.	Name	To	Fee	Ref.
FW	(Brazil) Zé Eduardo	Released		

== Friendlies ==
Pahang confirmed friendlies against UiTM, Selangor United, Kelantan United, Terengganu II, Visakha, Chonburi and Army United.

17 December 2018 1	Pahang	3–1	UiTM	Temerloh
20:45 UTC+8	Kogileswaran; Stevens; Lee Chang-hoon			Stadium: Temerloh Mini Stadium

18 December 2018 2	Pahang	2–0	Selangor United	Temerloh
20:45 UTC+8	Zuhair; Wan Zaharulnizam			Stadium: Temerloh Mini Stadium

17 January 2019 3	Pahang	2–0	Kelantan United	Kuantan
20:45 UTC+8	Wan Zaharulnizam; Saddil			Stadium: Darul Makmur Stadium

24 January 2019 4	Pahang	2–1	Terengganu II	Kuantan
20:45 UTC+8				Stadium: Darul Makmur Stadium

Tour of Thailand (7 to 13 Jan 2019)

8 January 2019 1	Pahang	1–3	(Cambodia) Visakha	Buriram
	Safuwan			Stadium: Buriram Training Center

10 January 2019 2	Pahang	2–1	(Thailand) Chonburi	Chonburi
	Zuhair		Lukian 75'	Stadium: IPE Stadium

12 January 2019 3	Pahang	0–0	(Thailand) Army United	Thai Army Sports Stadium

== Competitions ==
=== Overview ===
Competition	Record							
Competition	Pld	W	D	L	GF	GA	GD	Win %
Super League	22	12	7	3	37	21	+16	54.55
FA Cup	6	4	0	2	13	6	+7	66.67
Malaysia Cup	1	1	0	0	3	1	+2	100.00
Total	29	17	7	5	53	28	+25	58.62

Last updated: 3 July 2019
Source: Competitions

=== Malaysia Super League ===
==== League table ====
Pos	Team	Pld	W	D	L	GF	GA	GD	Pts	Qualification or relegation
1	Johor Darul Ta'zim (C)	22	16	5	1	49	19	+30	53	Qualification for AFC Champions League group stage
2	Pahang	22	12	7	3	37	21	+16	43	
3	Selangor	22	10	7	5	41	35	+6	37	
4	Kedah (Note: Kedah FA qualified for the AFC Champions League preliminary round 2 as Malaysia FA Cup winners.)	22	9	7	6	37	29	+8	34	Qualification for AFC Champions League preliminary round 2
5	Perak	22	8	9	5	36	31	+5	33	

Source: MFL
Rules for classification: 1) Points; 2) Goal difference; 3) Number of goals scored.
(C) Champions

==== Results summary ====
Overall								Home						Away					
Pld	W	D	L	GF	GA	GD	Pts	W	D	L	GF	GA	GD	W	D	L	GF	GA	GD
22	12	7	3	37	21	+16	43	7	4	0	21	7	+14	5	3	3	16	14	+2

Last updated: 20 July 2019.

==== Matches ====
On 22 December 2018, the Malaysia Super League fixtures for the forthcoming season were announced.

1 February 2019 1	Kuala Lumpur	1–3	Pahang	Cheras
21:00 UTC+8	Paulo Josué (yellow card) 10'; Afiq 49'	Report	Saddil 24'; Nwakaeme 52', 90+4'	Stadium: Kuala Lumpur Stadium; Referee: Nazmi Nasaruddin

9 February 2019 2	Pahang	3–0	Terengganu	Kuantan
21:00 UTC+8	Nwakaeme 13', (yellow card) 88'; Sumareh (yellow card) 29'; Goulon 51'; Safuwan (yellow card) 56'; Norshahrul 90+1'	Report	Lee Tuck (yellow card) 35'; Adib (yellow card) 45+1'; Thierry (yellow card) 45+4'; Khairu Azrin (yellow card) 88'	Stadium: Darul Makmur Stadium; Referee: Razlan Joffri Ali

16 February 2019 3	Melaka United	1–1	Pahang	Paya Rumput
21:00 UTC+8	Deevan Raj (yellow card) 85'; Safiq 90+1' (pen.); Casagrande (yellow card) 90+2'	Report	Goulon 5'; Safuwan (yellow card) 17'; Azam (yellow card) 72' (yellow-red card) 80'; Nwakaeme (yellow card) 80'; Zé Eduardo (yellow card) 89'	Stadium: Hang Jebat Stadium; Referee: Wan Mohamad Tarmizi Wan Ibrahim

24 February 2019 4	Pahang	1–1	Selangor	Kuantan
21:00 UTC+8	Zaharulnizam (yellow card) 18', (goal) 33'; Goulon (yellow card) 54' (yellow-red card) 73'; Safuwan (yellow card) 77'; Zé Eduardo (yellow card) 90+1'	Report	Rufino 61'; Amri (yellow card) 90+1'	Stadium: Darul Makmur Stadium; Referee: Mohd Fairuzi Mat Desa

2 March 2019 5	PKNP	0–3	Pahang	Manjung
21:00 UTC+8	Giancarlo (yellow card) 31'; Asyraf (yellow card) 59'	Report	Ze Eduardo 2', (yellow card) 71'; Afif (yellow card) 4'; Nwakaeme 49'; Azam (yellow card) 67'; Faisal (yellow card) 69'; Norshahrul 73'	Stadium: Manjung Municipal Council Stadium; Referee: Fitri Maskon

8 March 2019 6	Pahang	1–0	Kedah	Kuantan
21:00 UTC+8	Davies (yellow card) 18'; Nwakaeme (yellow card) 52'; Zuhair 85'	Report	Baddrol (yellow card) 5'; Fernando (yellow card) 28'; Bauman (yellow card) 40'; Helmi (yellow card) 72'; Alif (yellow card) 82'	Stadium: Darul Makmur Stadium; Referee: Zamzaidi Katimin

30 March 2019 7	Felda United	1–3	Pahang	Jengka
21:00 UTC+8	Watanabe (yellow card) 39'; Thiago 48'	Report	Norshahrul 45'; Zé Eduardo 63' (pen.); Faisal 90+1'	Stadium: Tun Abdul Razak Stadium; Referee: Suhaizi Shukri

7 April 2019 8	Pahang	1–1	Petaling Jaya City	Kuantan
21:00 UTC+8	Zé Eduardo 49'; Muslim (yellow card) 52'; Nwakaeme (yellow card) 58'; Goulon (yellow card) 90+1'; Zaharulnizam (yellow card) 90+4'	Report	Safee 49'; Veenod (yellow card) 38'; Muhaimin (yellow card) 60'	Stadium: Darul Makmur Stadium; Referee: Suhaimi Mat Hassan

14 April 2019 9	PKNS	1–2	Pahang	Shah Alam
21:00 UTC+8	Vathanaka 13'; Gurusamy (yellow card) 32'; Shahrom (yellow card) 89'	Report	Nwakaeme 24'; Zé Eduardo 75'	Stadium: Shah Alam Stadium; Referee: Mohd Zohri Tajuddin

20 April 2019 10	Perak	0–1	Pahang	Ipoh
21:00 UTC+8	Amirul (yellow card) 23'; Rafiuddin (yellow card) 80'	Report	Safuwan (yellow card) 39'; Azam (yellow card) 45' (yellow-red card) 72'; Goulon 56'; Saddil (yellow card) 67'; Sumareh (yellow card) 69'	Stadium: Perak Stadium; Referee: Razlan Joffri Ali

28 April 2019 11	Pahang	1–1	Johor	Kuantan
21:00 UTC+8	Goulon 35', (yellow card) 79'; Faisal (yellow card) 57'; Salomon (yellow card) 69'	Report	Cabrera 5'; Kunanlan (yellow card) 28'; Maurício (yellow card) 40' (yellow-red card) 45+3'	Stadium: Darul Makmur Stadium; Referee: Mohd Zohri Tajuddin

4 May 2019 12	Petaling Jaya City	2–0	Pahang	Petaling Jaya
21:00 UTC+8	Pedro Henrique 35'; Serginho 58', (yellow card) 69'; Muhaimin (yellow card) 68'	Report	Azam (yellow card) 57'	Stadium: Petaling Jaya Stadium; Referee: Nazmi Nasaruddin

14 May 2019 13	Johor	2–0	Pahang	Larkin
22:00 UTC+8	Corbin-Ong (yellow card) 65'; Hariss 69'; Akhyar 90+3'	Report	Safuwan (yellow card) 8'; Faisal (yellow card) 13'; Muslim (yellow card) 30'; Azam (yellow card) 41'	Stadium: Larkin Stadium; Referee: Zulkarnain Zakaria

19 May 2019 14	Pahang	0–0	Perak	Kuantan
22:00 UTC+8	Goulon (yellow card) 25'; Sumareh (yellow card) 37'; Faisal (yellow card) 40'; Zé Eduardo (yellow card) 43'	Report	Leandro (yellow card) 72'; Amirul (yellow card) 89'	Stadium: Darul Makmur Stadium; Referee: Wan Mohamad Tarmizi

17 July 2019 15	Pahang	3–1	Felda United	Kuantan
21:00 UTC+8	Kaimbi 14'; Goulon 72'; Nwakaeme 87'	Report	Chanturu 28'; Thiago Junio (yellow card) 75'	Stadium: Darul Makmur Stadium; Referee: Khirulazuan Kidam

14 June 2019 16	Kedah	0–0	Pahang	Alor Setar
21:00 UTC+8	Renan (yellow card) 30'; Baddrol (yellow card) 62'	Report		Stadium: Darul Aman Stadium; Referee: Mohd Fairuzi Mat Desa

18 June 2019 17	Pahang	2–0	PKNP	Kuantan
21:00 UTC+8	Kaimbi 21'; Nwakaeme 31'; Goulon (yellow card) 52'	Report	Fadhil (yellow card) 55'; Pinto (yellow card) 87'	Stadium: Darul Makmur Stadium; Referee: Khirulazuan Kidam

25 June 2019 18	Selangor	5–2	Pahang	Shah Alam
21:00 UTC+8	Khyril 31'; Ifedayo 37', 44', 87'; Endrick 46', (yellow card) 84'	Report	Nik Sharif (yellow card) 11'; Dinesh (yellow card) 29'; Afif (yellow card) 45+2'; Kogileswaran 68'; Sumareh 77'	Stadium: Shah Alam Stadium; Referee: Mohd Amirul Izwan Yaacob

6 July 2019 19	Pahang	2–0	Kuala Lumpur	Kuantan
21:00 UTC+8	Goulon 57' (pen.), (yellow card) 90+2'; Azam (yellow card) 90+5'	Report	Zhafri (yellow card) 34'; Irfan (yellow card) 84'	Stadium: Darul Makmur Stadium; Referee: Razlan Joffri Ali

9 July 2019 20	Pahang	3–2	PKNS	Kuantan
21:00 UTC+8	Goulon 31'; Muslim 43'; Safuwan (yellow card) 73'; Davies 89'	Report	Sherman 61'; Guerra 67'; Kozubaev (yellow card) 75'; Qayyum (yellow card) 83'; Mahalli (yellow card) 90+3'	Stadium: Darul Makmur Stadium; Referee: Suhaimi Mat Hassan

12 July 2019 21	Terengganu	1–1	Pahang	Kuala Terengganu
21:00 UTC+8	Syamim 42', (yellow card) 74'; Tuck (yellow card) 56'; Adib (yellow card) 83'	Report	Davies (yellow card) 47'; Sumareh 51'; Zubir (yellow card) 76'	Stadium: Sultan Ismail Nasiruddin Shah Stadium; Referee: Mohd Amirul Izwan Yaacob

20 July 2019 22	Pahang	4–1	Melaka United	Kuantan
21:00 UTC+8	Kaimbi 2', 69'; Sumareh 41'; Ramdani 90+1'	Report	Saiful (yellow card) 25'; Milunović 58'	Stadium: Darul Makmur Stadium; Referee: Mohd Hasrol Mohd Amir

=== FA Cup ===
3 April 2019 Second round	Pahang	4–0	PIB FC	Kuantan
21:00 UTC+08:00	Zaharulnizam 9'; Zé Eduardo 14'; Safuwan 27'; Faisal 60'; Davies (yellow card) 84'	Report	Anuar (yellow card) 32'; Faizal (yellow card) 55'	Stadium: Darul Makmur Stadium; Attendance: 2,153; Referee: Ahmad Zuhaidi Dzulkifli

17 April 2019 Third round	UKM	0–1	Pahang	Bandar Tun Razak
21:00 UTC+08:00		Report	Zé Eduardo (yellow card) 45'; Saddil (yellow card) 64'; Davies 84'	Stadium: Kuala Lumpur Stadium; Attendance: 4,481; Referee: Mohd Zohri Tajuddin

1 May 2019 Quarter-finals first leg	Terengganu	2–1	Pahang	Kuala Terengganu
21:00 UTC+08:00	Malik Ariff 9'; Tchétché 27'; Nasrullah (yellow card) 61'	Report	Muslim (yellow card) 32'; Zé Eduardo (yellow card) 78' (goal) 88'; Zubir (yellow card) 83'	Stadium: Sultan Ismail Nasiruddin Shah Stadium; Referee: Zulkarnain Zakaria

11 May 2019 Quarter-finals second leg	Pahang	4–0 (5–2 agg.)	Terengganu	Kuantan
22:00 UTC+08:00	Faisal 7'; Nwakaeme 48' (pen.), 63'; Sumareh 75'	Report	Suffian (yellow card) 47'	Stadium: Darul Makmur Stadium; Referee: Suhaizi Shukri

22 June 2019 Semi-finals first leg	Pahang	3–1	Perak	Kuantan
22:00 UTC+08:00	Goulon 12', 90+3'; Sumareh 39'; Safuwan (yellow card) 73'	Report	Eldor (yellow card) 15'; Partiban 55'; Nazirul (yellow card) 57'; Ronaldo (yellow card) 76'	Stadium: Darul Makmur Stadium; Referee: Zulkarnain Zakaria

29 June 2019 Semi-finals second leg	Perak	3–0 (4–3 agg.)	Pahang	Ipoh
22:00 UTC+08:00	Rafiuddin (yellow card) 32'; Brendan 35'; Partiban 42'; Faisal 44' (o.g.); Leandro (yellow card) 69'; Kenny (yellow card) 90+2'	Report	Nwakaeme (yellow card) 29'; Safuwan (yellow card) 33'	Stadium: Perak Stadium; Referee: Fitri Maskon

=== Malaysia Cup ===
==== Group stage ====
Pos	Team	Pld	W	D	L	GF	GA	GD	Pts	Qualification	PAH	PRK	PEN	SAB
1	Pahang	6	5	0	1	12	5	+7	15	Advance to knockout stage	—	3–0	3–1	1–0
2	Perak	6	2	3	1	9	7	+2	9	Advance to knockout stage	3–1	—	1–1	3–0
3	Penang	6	1	2	3	5	10	−5	5		0–2	1–1	—	2–1
4	Sabah	6	1	1	4	5	9	−4	4		1–2	1–1	2–0	—

Source: FAM MFL

3 August 2019 1	Pahang	3–1	Penang	Kuantan
21:00 UTC+08:00	Safuwan (yellow card) 56'; Nwakaeme 59'; Sumareh 66'; Zubir (yellow card) 74'; Goulon (yellow card) 80'; Muslim 84'	Report	Yoges (yellow card) 41'; Bottaro 51'; Agüero (yellow card) 80'	Stadium: Darul Makmur Stadium; Referee: Zulkarnain Zakaria

8 August 2019 2	Pahang	3–0	Perak	Kuantan
21:00 UTC+08:00	Nwakaeme (yellow card) 13'; Goulon 40'; Sumareh (yellow card) 50'; Saddil 68'; Kaimbi 82', (yellow card) 90'	Report	Brendan (yellow card) 45'; Kenny (yellow card) 85'	Stadium: Darul Makmur Stadium; Referee: Wan Mohamad Tarmizi

== Statistics ==
=== Appearances and goals ===
Correct as of match played on 8 August 2019

No.	Pos	Nat	Player	Total		League		FA Cup		Malaysia Cup	
No.	Pos	Nat	Player	Apps	Goals	Apps	Goals	Apps	Goals	Apps	Goals
1	GK	(Malaysia) MAS	Helmi Eliza	23	0	15	0	6	0	2	0
2	DF	(Malaysia) MAS	Matthew Davies	29	3	21	2	6	1	2	0
3	DF	(France) FRA	Hérold Goulon	27	11	19	8	6	2	2	1
4	DF	(Malaysia) MAS	Dinesh Rajasingam	3	0	2	0	1	0	0	0
6	MF	(Malaysia) MAS	Hazri Rozali	0	0	0	0	0	0	0	0
7	MF	(Malaysia) MAS	Faisal Halim	24	3	1+16	1	2+3	2	0+2	0
8	MF	(Malaysia) MAS	Wan Zaharulnizam	26	2	11+8	1	3+3	1	0+1	0
9	FW	(Malaysia) MAS	Norshahrul Idlan	27	3	15+5	3	6	0	1	0
10	FW	(Nigeria) NGR	Dickson Nwakaeme	19	10	9+4	7	4	2	2	1
11	FW	(Namibia) NAM	Lazarus Kaimbi	11	5	7	4	2	0	2	1
12	DF	(Malaysia) MAS	Bunyamin Umar	8	0	5+2	0	0+1	0	0	0
14	DF	(Malaysia) MAS	Faisal Rosli	20	0	14+1	0	5	0	0	0
15	MF	(Indonesia) IDN	Saddil Ramdani	28	3	16+5	2	1+4	0	1+1	1
16	DF	(Malaysia) MAS	Zubir Azmi	11	0	6+1	0	0+2	0	2	0
17	MF	(Malaysia) MAS	Zuhair Aizat	13	1	5+6	1	1+1	0	0	0
18	DF	(Malaysia) MAS	Sharul Nizam	1	0	0	0	0+1	0	0	0
19	DF	(Malaysia) MAS	Afif Amiruddin	5	0	2+3	0	0	0	0	0
20	MF	(Malaysia) MAS	Azam Azih	23	1	15+1	1	4+1	0	2	0
21	DF	(Singapore) SGP	Safuwan Baharudin	24	1	16+1	0	5	1	2	0
22	GK	(Malaysia) MAS	Remezey Che Ros	7	0	7	0	0	0	0	0
23	MF	(Malaysia) MAS	Salomon Raj	4	0	2+1	0	0+1	0	0	0
24	DF	(Malaysia) MAS	Muslim Ahmad	26	3	18	2	6	0	2	1
26	MF	(Malaysia) MAS	Mohamadou Sumareh	28	6	20+1	3	5	2	2	1
27	GK	(Malaysia) MAS	Wafieyuddin Shamsudin	0	0	0	0	0	0	0	0
28	FW	(Malaysia) MAS	Kogileswaran Raj	8	1	1+5	1	0+1	0	0+1	0
29	MF	(Malaysia) MAS	Nik Sharif Haseefy	2	0	1+1	0	0	0	0	0
30	DF	(Malaysia) MAS	Ashar Al Aafiz	3	0	1+2	0	0	0	0	0
Players transferred out during the season
11	FW	(Brazil) BRA	Zé Eduardo	15	6	13	4	2	2	0	0

=== Goalscorers ===
Includes all competitive matches.

Rank	Pos.	No.	Player	League	FA Cup	Malaysia Cup	Total
1	DF	3	(France) Hérold Goulon	8	2	1	11
1	FW	10	(Nigeria) Dickson Nwakaeme	7	2	1	10
3	FW	11	(Brazil) Zé Eduardo	4	2	0	6
3	MF	26	(Malaysia) Mohamadou Sumareh	3	2	1	6
5	FW	11	(Namibia) Lazarus Kaimbi	4	0	1	5
6	MF	7	(Malaysia) Faisal Halim	1	2	0	3
6	FW	9	(Malaysia) Norshahrul Idlan	3	0	0	3
6	DF	2	(Malaysia) Matthew Davies	2	1	0	3
6	DF	24	(Malaysia) Muslim Ahmad	2	0	1	3
6	MF	15	(Indonesia) Saddil Ramdani	2	0	1	3
11	MF	8	(Malaysia) Wan Zaharulnizam	1	1	0	2
12	MF	17	(Malaysia) Zuhair Aizat	1	0	0	1
12	MF	20	(Malaysia) Azam Azih	1	0	0	1
12	MF	21	(Singapore) Safuwan Baharudin	0	1	0	1
12	FW	28	(Malaysia) Kogileswaran Raj	1	0	0	1
Own goals				0	0	0	0
Total				40	13	6	59

=== Clean sheets ===
Rnk	No.	Player	Super League	FA Cup	Malaysia Cup	Total
1	1	(Malaysia) Helmi Eliza	6	3	1	10
1	22	(Malaysia) Remezey Che Ros	2	0	0	2
Total			8	3	1	12

=== Disciplinary record ===
No.	Pos.	Name	Super League		FA Cup		Malaysia Cup		Total	
No.	Pos.	Name	Yellow card	Red card	Yellow card	Red card	Yellow card	Red card	Yellow card	Red card
3	DF	(France) Hérold Goulon	6	1	-	-	1	-	7	1
21	MF	(Singapore) Safuwan Baharudin	6	-	2	-	1	-	9	-
20	MF	(Malaysia) Azam Azih	5	2	-	-	-	-	5	2
10	FW	(Nigeria) Dickson Nwakaeme	4	-	1	-	-	-	5	-
14	DF	(Malaysia) Faisal Rosli	3	-	-	-	-	-	3	-
26	MF	(Malaysia) Mohamadou Sumareh	3	-	-	-	-	-	3	-
19	DF	(Malaysia) Afif Amiruddin	2	-	-	-	-	-	2	-
24	DF	(Malaysia) Muslim Ahmad	2	-	1	-	-	-	3	-
8	MF	(Malaysia) Wan Zaharulnizam	2	-	-	-	-	-	2	-
2	DF	(Malaysia) Matthew Davies	2	-	1	-	-	-	3	-
4	DF	(Malaysia) Dinesh Rajasingam	1	-	-	-	-	-	1	-
7	DF	(Malaysia) Faisal Halim	1	-	-	-	-	-	1	-
15	MF	(Indonesia) Saddil Ramdani	1	-	1	-	-	-	2	-
16	DF	(Malaysia) Zubir Azmi	1	-	1	-	1	-	3	-
23	MF	(Malaysia) Salamon Raj	1	-	-	-	-	-	1	-
29	MF	(Malaysia) Nik Sharif Haseefy	1	-	-	-	-	-	1	-
9	FW	(Brazil) Zé Eduardo	4	-	2	-	-	-	6	-
Total			45	3	9	0	3	0	57	3
