= 2018 Pahang FA season =

Pahang
2018 season
- President: Tengku Abdul Rahman Ibni Sultan Ahmad Shah
- Manager: Suffian Awang
- Head Coach: Dollah Salleh
- Stadium: Darul Makmur Stadium
- Super League: 4th
- FA Cup: Winners
- Malaysia Cup: Quarter-final
- Top goalscorer: League: Patrick Cruz; Issey Nakajima-Farran (6 goals); All: Patrick Cruz (11 goals)
Home colours	Away colours	Third colours

The 2018 season was Pahang's 15th season in the Malaysian Malaysia Super League since its inception in 2004.

== Players ==
=== First team squad ===
As of 10 May 2018.

No.	Name	Nat	Position	Date of birth (age)	Signed from
Goalkeepers
1	Helmi Eliza	(Malaysia)	GK	20 January 1983 (age 43)	(Malaysia) Negeri Sembilan
22	Remezey Che Ros	(Malaysia)	GK	6 September 1982 (age 43)	(Malaysia) Kuala Lumpur
27	Wafieyuddin Shamsudin	(Malaysia)	GK	10 June 1989 (age 36)	(Malaysia) Shahzan Muda
33	Daniel Wafiuddin	(Malaysia)	GK	16 March 1997 (age 28)	Youth team
Defenders
2	Matthew Davies (Captain)	(Malaysia) (Australia)	RB / RWB	7 February 1995 (age 30)	(Australia) Perth Glory
4	Rajasingam Dinesh	(Malaysia)	LB / LWB	13 February 1998 (age 27)	(Malaysia) Harimau Muda C
12	Bunyamin Umar	(Malaysia)	CB / RB / DM	7 January 1988 (age 38)	(Malaysia) Selangor
14	Faisal Rosli	(Malaysia)	LB / LW	21 January 1991 (age 35)	(Malaysia) Shahzan Muda
16	Zubir Azmi	(Malaysia)	LB / LWB	14 November 1991 (age 34)	(Malaysia) Terengganu
18	Shahrul Nizam	(Malaysia)	LB / LWB	15 June 1996 (age 29)	Youth team
19	Afif Amiruddin	(Malaysia)	CB / RB	22 March 1984 (age 41)	(Malaysia) Perlis
21	Safuwan Baharudin	(Singapore)	CB / DM	22 September 1991 (age 34)	(Malaysia) PDRM
24	Muslim Ahmad	(Malaysia)	CB	25 April 1989 (age 36)	(Malaysia) Kelantan
30	Ashar Al Aafiz	(Malaysia)	CB / RB	28 March 1995 (age 30)	Youth team
Midfielders
6	Hazri Rozali	(Malaysia)	DM / CM	26 June 1986 (age 39)	(Malaysia) Melaka United
7	Faisal Halim	(Malaysia)	ST / RW / LW	7 January 1998 (age 28)	(Malaysia) Penang
8	Wan Zaharulnizam	(Malaysia)	RW / LW	8 May 1991 (age 34)	(Malaysia) Kelantan
17	Zuhair Aizat	(Malaysia)	RW / LW	1 October 1996 (age 29)	Youth team
20	Azam Azih	(Malaysia)	AM	3 March 1995 (age 30)	(Malaysia) Harimau Muda B
23	Salomon Raj	(Malaysia)	DM / CM	23 March 1994 (age 31)	(Malaysia) Selangor
26	Mohamadou Sumareh	(Malaysia)	RW / AM	20 September 1991 (age 34)	(Malaysia) Perlis
31	Saddil Ramdani	(Indonesia)	RW / AM	2 January 1999 (age 27)	(Indonesia) Persela Lamongan
Forwards
9	Norshahrul Idlan	(Malaysia)	ST / LW / RW / AM	8 June 1986 (age 39)	(Malaysia) Felda United
28	Kogileswaran Raj	(Malaysia)	ST / LW / RW / AM	21 September 1998 (age 27)	(Malaysia) Harimau Muda C

== Transfers ==
=== In ===
1st leg

No.	Pos	Player	Transferred From	Fee	Date	Source
9	FW	(Malaysia) Norshahrul Idlan	(Malaysia) Felda United	Undisclosed	November 19, 2017	
21	DF	(Singapore) Safuwan Baharudin	(Malaysia) PDRM	Undisclosed	November 19, 2017	
12	DF	(Malaysia) Bunyamin Omar	(Malaysia) Selangor	Undisclosed	December 10, 2017	
11	FW	(Cambodia) Chan Vathanaka	(Cambodia) Boeung Ket Angkor	Undisclosed	December 15, 2017	
22	GK	(Malaysia) Remezey Che Ros	(Malaysia) Kuala Lumpur	Undisclosed	December 19, 2017	
6	MF	(Malaysia) Hazri Rozali	(Malaysia) Melaka United	Undisclosed	December 22, 2017	
33	GK	(Malaysia) Daniel Wafiuddin	Youth team	Undisclosed	December 19, 2017	
27	GK	(Malaysia) Wafieyuddin Shamsudin	(Malaysia) Shahzan Muda	Undisclosed	December 19, 2017	
18	DF	(Malaysia) Shahrul Nizam	Youth team	Undisclosed	December 17, 2017	
17	MF	(Malaysia) Zuhair Aizat	Youth team	Undisclosed	December 17, 2017	
3	DF	(Brazil) Alex Moraes	(Brazil) São José	Undisclosed	January 28, 2018	
10	FW	(Liberia) Forkey Doe	(Malaysia) Selangor	Undisclosed	February 9, 2018	
5	FW	(Brazil) Patrick Cruz	(Vietnam) Sài Gòn	Undisclosed	February 23, 2018	

2nd leg

No.	Pos	Player	Transferred From	Fee	Date	Source
11	FW	(Canada) Issey Nakajima-Farran	(Malaysia) Terengganu	Undisclosed	May 8, 2018	
10	FW	(Nigeria) Austin Amutu	(Turkey) Yeni Malatyaspor	Undisclosed	May 14, 2018	

=== Out ===
1st leg

No.	Pos	Player	Transferred To	Fee	Date	Source
3	DF	(Malaysia) Saiful Nizam	(Malaysia) Kuala Lumpur	Undisclosed	December 8, 2017	
5	MF	(Malaysia) Ashari Samsudin	(Malaysia) Terengganu	Undisclosed	December 14, 2017	
11	MF	(Malaysia) Syamim Yahya	(Malaysia) Felda United	Undisclosed	December 2, 2017	
15	DF	(South Korea) Heo Jae-won	(South Korea) Jeonnam Dragons	Free		
16	MF	(Malaysia) Nurridzuan Abu Hassan	(Malaysia) PKNS	Undisclosed	December 2, 2017	
17	MF	(Malaysia) Joseph Kalang Tie	(Malaysia) Selangor	Undisclosed	November 20, 2017	
18	DF	(Malaysia) Nordin Alias	(Malaysia) Marcerra Kuantan	Undisclosed	November 20, 2017	
27	GK	(Malaysia) Wan Azraie	(Malaysia) Terengganu	Undisclosed	November 8, 2017	
10	MF	(Argentina) Yamil Romero		Undisclosed		
6	MF	(Malaysia) D. Christie Jayaseelan	(Malaysia) Felda United	Undisclosed	December 12, 2017	
22	GK	(Malaysia) Saufi Mohamad	(Malaysia) Shahzan Muda	Undisclosed	November 19, 2017	
29	FW	(Brazil) Matheus Alves	(South Korea) Suwon	Undisclosed	December 31, 2017	
9	MF	(Malaysia) Kiko Insa	(Thailand) Bangkok Glass	Undisclosed	February 2, 2018	
3	DF	(Brazil) Alex Moraes	(Malaysia) Negeri Sembilan	February 23, 2018		
10	FW	(Liberia) Francis Forkey Doe	Released	April 8, 2018		

2nd leg

No.	Pos	Player	Transferred To	Fee	Date	Source
11	ST	(Cambodia) Chan Vathanaka	Released		May 9, 2018	

== Friendlies ==
Thailand Pre-season Tour 2018

5 January 2018 1	Muangthong United "B" (Thailand)	1–3	(Malaysia) Pahang	Nonthaburi Province
			Bunyamin Omar; Mohamadou Sumareh; Zuhair Aizat	Stadium: Muangthong United Training Centre

7 January 2018 2	Air Force Central (Thailand)	1–4	(Malaysia) Pahang	At Le Meridien Sport Centre
			Hellquist; Safuwan Baharudin 0', 0'; Shah Amirul

9 January 2018 3	Gyeongnam (South Korea)	1–0	(Malaysia) Pahang	Nonthaburi Province
				Stadium: Muangthong United Training Centre

MB Terengganu Cup

15 January 2018 1	Terengganu (Malaysia)	4–2	(Malaysia) Pahang	Kuala Terengganu
	Ashari Samsudin; Igor Zonjić; Kipré Tchétché; Faiz Nasir		Hellquist; Norshahrul Idlan	Stadium: Sultan Ismail Nasiruddin Shah Stadium

16 January 2018 2	Melaka United (Malaysia)	4–1	(Malaysia) Pahang	Kuala Terengganu
	Gopinathan Ramachandra 21'; Surendran Ravindran 49'; Mohd Fauzi Roslan 69'; Nurshamil Abd Ghani 72'		Chan Vathanaka 85'	Stadium: Sultan Mizan Zainal Abidin Stadium

17 January 2018 3	Terengganu II (Malaysia)	1–2	(Malaysia) Pahang	Kuala Terengganu
				Stadium: Sultan Mizan Zainal Abidin Stadium

Singapore Season-Break Tour 2018

19 March 2018 1	Pahang (Malaysia)	v	(Singapore) Warriors	Choa Chu Kang Stadium
1900 hours

== Competitions ==
=== Malaysia Super League ===
==== League table ====
Pos	Team	Pld	W	D	L	GF	GA	GD	Pts	Qualification or relegation
2	Perak	22	10	6	6	35	27	+8	36	Qualification for the AFC Champions League second preliminary round
3	PKNS	22	10	5	7	37	29	+8	35	
4	Pahang	22	9	7	6	35	21	+14	34	
5	Terengganu	22	10	4	8	32	31	+1	34	
6	Kedah	22	9	5	8	37	36	+1	32	

Source: FAM, FMLLP
Rules for classification: 1) Points; 2) Goal difference; 3) Number of goals scored.

==== Results by matchday ====
Matchday	1	2	3	4	5	6	7	8	9	10	11	12	13	14	15	16	17	18	19	20	21	22
Ground	H	A	H	A	H	A	H	H	H	H	A	H	A	A	H	A	H	H	A	A	H	A
Result	D	L	W	W	W	D	W	W	D	L	L	W	W	L	L	W	D	D	D	D	W	L
Position	7	10	6	3	2	3	2	2	3	3	3	3	2	2	3	3	4	5	3	4	3	4

Updated to match(es) played on 29 July 2018. Source: Matches
A = Away; H = Home; W = Win; D = Draw; L = Loss

==== Matches ====
Win Draw Loss

4 February 2018 1	Pahang	0–0	Perak	Kuantan
21:00 MYT		Report	Brendan (yellow card) 33'	Stadium: Darulmakmur Stadium; Referee: Fitri Maskon

7 February 2018 2	PKNS	1–0	Pahang	Shah Alam
21:00 MYT	Qayyum (yellow card) 57'; Safee 90+2'	Report	Alex Moraes (yellow card) 23'; Azam (yellow card) 63'	Stadium: Shah Alam Stadium; Referee: Suhaizi Shukri

10 February 2018 3	Pahang	3–0	Kelantan	Kuantan
21:00 MYT	Forkey Doe 13'; Safuwan (yellow card) 48'; Sumareh 55'; Azam 87'	Report	Dong (yellow card) 39'	Stadium: Darul Makmur Stadium; Referee: Suhaimi Mat Hassan

24 February 2018 4	Selangor	1–3	Pahang	Cheras
21:00 MYT	Rufino 38' (pen.), (yellow card) 63'; Willian (yellow card) 69'; Razman (yellow card) 77'	Report	Cruz 7'; Sumareh (yellow card) 26'; Safuwan (yellow card) 45+2'; Forkey Doe 49', 71' (pen.)	Stadium: KLFA Stadium; Referee: Mohd Nafeez Abdul Wahab

10 March 2018 5	Pahang	4–0	Negeri Sembilan	Kuantan
21:00 MYT	Cruz 27', 66'; Forkey Doe 45+1', 89'	Report	Fauzan (yellow card) 63'	Stadium: Darul Makmur Stadium; Referee: Fitri Maskon

15 April 2018 6	Kuala Lumpur	2–2	Pahang	Cheras
21:00 MYT	De Paula 10'; Indra Putra 39'	Report	Sumareh 13'; Kogileswaran 60'; Vathanaka (yellow card) 68'	Stadium: KLFA Stadium; Referee: Fitri Maskon

28 April 2018 7	Pahang	2–0	Melaka United	Kuantan
21:00 MYT	Safuwan (yellow card) 39'; Azam (yellow card) 54'; Cruz 75'; Faizal 90+3', (yellow card) 90+4'	Report	Gopinathan (yellow card) 74'	Stadium: Darul Makmur Stadium; Referee: Mohd Nafeez Abdul Wahab

1 May 2018 8	Terengganu	1–3	Pahang	Kuala Terengganu
21:00 MYT	Lee Tuck 73' (pen.); Latiff (yellow card) 89'; Thierry (yellow card) 90'	Report	Cruz 38', 53'; Faisal (yellow card) 72'; Kogileswaran (yellow card) 90+2'; Faizal Halim 90+5'	Stadium: Sultan Ismail Nasiruddin Shah Stadium; Referee: Suresh Jayaraman

5 May 2018 9	Pahang	2–2	Kedah	Kuantan
21:00 MYT	Vathanaka 11'; Safuwan 40'; Cruz (yellow card) 90+3'	Report	Akram (yellow card) 23'; Halim (yellow card) 64'; Sandro 18', 51'; Rizal (yellow card) 90+3'	Stadium: Darul Makmur Stadium; Referee: Razlan Jeffri Ali

11 May 2018 10	Pahang	0–1	Terengganu	Kuantan
21:00 MYT		Report	Adib (yellow card) 30'; Lee Tuck (yellow card) 45+2'; Partiban (yellow card) 50'; Faiz 63'; Nasrullah (yellow card) 73'; Kamal Azizi (yellow card) 89'	Stadium: Darul Makmur Stadium; Referee: Fitri Maskon

22 May 2018 11	Kedah	2–0	Pahang	Alor Setar
22:00 MYT	Baddrol 45'; Helmi (yellow card) 57'; Liridon 89'	Report	Davies (yellow card) 43'; Safuwan (yellow card) 55'	Stadium: Darul Aman Stadium; Referee: Nazmi Nasaruddin

26 May 2018 12	Pahang	4–0	Kuala Lumpur	Kuantan
22:00 MYT	Muslim 8'; Safuwan 42'; Nakajima-Farran 53', (yellow card) 66'; Amutu 89'	Report	Akbarov (yellow card) 70'; Saiful Nizam (yellow card) 71'; Firdauz (yellow card) 81'	Stadium: Darul Makmur Stadium; Referee: Suhaizi Shukri

2 June 2018 13	PKNP	1–2	Pahang	Ipoh
22:00 MYT	Krjauklis 3'; Faizzwan (yellow card) 45+2'	Report	Sumareh 75'; Faisal 90+3'	Stadium: Perak Stadium; Referee: Wan Mohamad Tarmizi

8 June 2018 14	Johor Darul Ta'zim	1–0	Pahang	Larkin
22:00 MYT	Bunyamin (yellow card) 3', (goal) 18' (o.g.); Safuwan (yellow card) 12' (yellow-red card) 68'; Azam (yellow card) 20'; Wan Zaharulnizam (yellow card) 53'; Nakajima-Farran (yellow card) 65'; Sumareh (yellow card) 67'	Report	Márquez (yellow card) 22'; Corbin-Ong (yellow card) 71'	Stadium: Tan Sri Dato' Haji Hassan Yunos Stadium; Referee: Nazmi Nasaruddin

12 June 2018 15	Pahang	1–2	Johor Darul Ta'zim	Kuantan
22:00 MYT	Davies (yellow card) 23'; Wan Zaharulnizam (yellow card) 25'; Dinesh (yellow card) 41'; Nakajima-Farran 86'; Helmi (yellow card) 90'	Report	Elizari (yellow card) 29'; Márquez 33'; Syamer (yellow card) 60'; Afiq (yellow card) 68'; Cabrera 90+2' (pen.)	Stadium: Darul Makmur Stadium; Referee: Suhaizi Shukri

19 June 2018 16	Negeri Sembilan	1–3	Pahang	Paroi
21:00 MYT	Nasriq (yellow card) 79'; Fauzan 83'; Aiman (yellow card) 90'	Report	Nakajima-Farran 7', 65'; Norshahrul 72', (yellow card) 90+2'	Stadium: Tuanku Abdul Rahman Stadium; Referee: Mohd Nafeez Abdul Wahab

26 June 2018 17	Pahang	1–1	Selangor	Kuantan
21:00 MYT	Davies (yellow card) 36'; Bunyamin (yellow card) 45+3'; Azam Azih (yellow card) 45+3'; Wan Zaharulnizam 49'	Report	Alfonso Cruz (yellow card) 29'; Rufino 62'; Willian Pacheco (yellow card) 82'	Stadium: Darul Makmur Stadium; Referee: Nagor Amir Noor Mohamed

11 July 2018 18	Pahang	0–0	PKNP	Kuantan
21:00 MYT	Azam Azih (yellow card) 71'; Zubir 77'	Report	Fadhil (yellow card) 68'; Khuzaimi (yellow card) 84'; Sabir (yellow card) 87'	Stadium: Darul Makmur Stadium; Referee: Wan Mohamad Tarmizi

14 July 2018 19	Perak	1–1	Pahang	Ipoh
21:00 MYT	Nor Hakim 25'; Nazirul Naim (yellow card) 37'; Kenny Pallraj (yellow card) 75'	Report	Sumareh (yellow card) 8'; Norshahrul 17'; Davies (yellow card) 77'	Stadium: Perak Stadium; Referee: Nagor Amir Noor Mohamed

18 July 2018 20	Melaka United	2–2	Pahang	Krubong
21:00 MYT	Gopinathan 15'; Zubovich 25'; Shazlan (yellow card) 35'; Nurshamil (yellow card) 89'	Report	Nakajima-Farran 8'; Amutu 45+2'; Wan Zaharulnizam (yellow card) 53'	Stadium: Hang Jebat Stadium; Referee: Zulkarnain Zakaria

21 July 2018 21	Pahang	1–0	PKNS	Kuantan
21:00 MYT	Amutu (yellow card) 25'; Nakajima-Farran 26'; Azam (yellow card) 85'	Report	Rodney (yellow card) 25'	Stadium: Darul Makmur Stadium; Referee: Suhaimi Mat Hassan

29 July 2018 22	Kelantan	2–1	Pahang	Kota Bharu
21:00 MYT	Nik Akif (yellow card) 36'; Danial Ashraf 42'; Shafiq 77'	Report	Bunyamin (yellow card) 9'; Amutu 65'	Stadium: Sultan Muhammad IV Stadium; Referee: Zulkarnain Zakaria

=== Malaysia FA Cup ===
Win Draw Loss

4 March 2018 Second round	Pahang	2–1	ATM	Kuantan
21:00 MYT	Norshahrul 36'; Safuwan 76'	Report	Suhairi (yellow card) 41'; Zaironi 67'; Zabeel (yellow card) 75'	Stadium: Darulmakmur Stadium; Referee: Abd Rahman Wahab

17 March 2018 Third round	Pahang	1–0	Kedah	Kuantan
21:00 MYT	Davies (yellow card) 22'; Sumareh 45+1'; Azam (yellow card) 55'	Report	Ariff (yellow card) 45'; Akram (yellow card) 90+5'	Stadium: Darulmakmur Stadium; Referee: Suhaizi Shukri

6 April 2018 Quarter-final First Leg	Pahang	0–0	Johor Darul Ta'zim	Kuantan, Pahang
21:00 UTC+8	Safuwan (yellow card) 22'; Afif (yellow card) 85'	Report		Stadium: Darul Makmur Stadium; Referee: Zulkarnain Zakaria

20 April 2018 Quarter-final Second Leg	Johor Darul Ta'zim	0–3 (0–3 agg.)	Pahang	Larkin, Johor
21:00 UTC+8	Corbin-Ong (yellow card) 52'		Patrick Cruz 9', 59', 77'; Azam (yellow card) 77'	Stadium: Tan Sri Dato' Haji Hassan Yunos Stadium; Referee: Razlan Jeffri Ali

23 June 2018 Semi-final First Leg	Pahang	1–1	PKNP	Kuantan, Pahang
21:00 UTC+8	Wan Zaharulnizam 25'	Report	Sukri 13'	Stadium: Darul Makmur Stadium; Referee: Zulkarnain Zakaria

1 July 2018 Semi-final Second Leg	PKNP	1–2 (2–3 agg.)	Pahang	Ipoh, Perak
21:00 UTC+8	Anzité (yellow card) 35', (goal) 82'; Hafiz (yellow card) 44'	Report	Amutu 32'; Safuwan (yellow card) 44'; Norshahrul 76'	Stadium: Perak Stadium; Referee: Suhaizi Shukri

7 July 2018 Final	Selangor	0–2	Pahang	Cheras, Kuala Lumpur
21:00 UTC+8	Amri (yellow card) 28' de la Cruz (yellow card) 61'; Razman (yellow card) 75'	Report	Azam 23', (yellow card) 80'; Patrick Cruz 62' (pen.)	Stadium: KLFA Stadium; Referee: Zulkarnain Zakaria

=== Malaysia Cup ===
==== Group stage ====
Pos	Team	Pld	W	D	L	GF	GA	GD	Pts	Qualification	SAB	PAH	SEL	PKNP
1	Sabah	6	4	1	1	8	7	+1	13	Advance to knockout stage	—	0–4	2–1	1–0
2	Pahang	6	3	2	1	9	4	+5	11	Advance to knockout stage	1–1	—	1–3	0–0
3	Selangor	6	2	0	4	9	11	−2	6		1–2	0–2	—	0–3
4	PKNP	6	1	1	4	4	8	−4	4		0–2	0–1	1–4	—

Updated to match(es) played on 17 September 2018. Source: FAM FMLLP

Win Draw Loss

4 August 2018 1	Pahang	1–1	Sabah	Kuantan
21:00 MYT	Amutu 45+1'	Live Report; Report	Ramos 47'; Randy (yellow card) 62'; Dendy (yellow card) 64'; Rawilson (yellow card) 90'	Stadium: Darulmakmur Stadium; Referee: Nagor Amir Noor Mohamed

11 August 2018 2	Selangor	0–2	Pahang	Shah Alam
21:00 MYT	Saiful (yellow card) 10'; Razman (yellow card) 35'	Report	Muslim 31', (yellow card) 50'; Safuwan (yellow card) 37'; Norshahrul 55'; Amutu (yellow card) 69'	Stadium: Shah Alam Stadium; Referee: Nazmi Nasaruddin

18 August 2018 3	PKNP	0–1	Pahang	Ipoh
21:00 MYT	Sukri (yellow card) 23'; Faizzwan (yellow card) 34'	Report	Safuwan (yellow card) 25'; Sumareh (yellow card) 33'; Davies (yellow card) 37', (goal) 82'	Stadium: Perak Stadium; Referee: Zamzaidi Katimin

25 August 2018 4	Pahang	0–0	PKNP	Kuantan
21:00 MYT		Report		Stadium: Darulmakmur Stadium; Referee: Ku Alauddin Ku Muhammad

1 September 2018 5	Pahang	1–3	Selangor	Kuantan
21:00 MYT	Baharudin 31'	Report	Segovia 8'; Pacheco 49'; K. Sarkunan 90+5'	Stadium: Darulmakmur Stadium; Referee: Fitri Maskon

16 September 2018 6	Sabah	0–4	Pahang	Kota Kinabalu
21:00 MYT		Report	Norshahrul 10'; Zuhair Aizat 37'; Cruz 78'; Issey 90+2'	Stadium: Likas Stadium; Referee: Zohri Tajuddin

==== Knock-stage ====
23 September 2018 Quarter-final leg 1	Pahang	1–1	Johor Darul Ta'zim	Darul Makmur Stadium, Kuantan
21:00 UTC+8	Baharudin 90+2'	Report	Cabrera 46'	Referee: Razlan Joffri Ali

29 September 2018 Quarter-final leg 2	Johor Darul Ta'zim	2–0	Pahang	Tan Sri Dato' Haji Hassan Yunos Stadium, Larkin
21:00 UTC+8	Safawi Rasid 1', 73'	Report		Referee: Zohri Tajudin

== Statistics ==
=== Appearances and goals ===
No.	Pos	Nat	Player	Total		Super League		FA Cup		Malaysia Cup	
No.	Pos	Nat	Player	Apps	Goals	Apps	Goals	Apps	Goals	Apps	Goals
Goalkeepers
1	GK	(Malaysia) MAS	Helmi Eliza	34	0	21+1	0	7	0	5	0
22	GK	(Malaysia) MAS	Remezey Che Ros	4	0	1	0	0	0	3	0
27	GK	(Malaysia) MAS	Wafieyuddin Shamsudin	0	0	0	0	0	0	0	0
Defenders
2	DF	(Malaysia) MAS	Matthew Davies	31	1	17	0	6	0	8	1
4	DF	(Malaysia) MAS	Rajasingam Dinesh	12	0	4+6	0	1+1	0	0	0
12	DF	(Malaysia) MAS	Bunyamin Umar	20	0	13+1	0	3+1	0	1+1	0
16	DF	(Malaysia) MAS	Zubir Azmi	17	0	9+3	0	0+1	0	4	0
18	DF	(Malaysia) MAS	Shahrul Nizam	5	0	0+2	0	0	0	1+2	0
19	DF	(Malaysia) MAS	Afif Amiruddin	18	0	6+1	0	4	0	7	0
21	DF	(Singapore) SGP	Safuwan Baharudin	32	5	19	2	6	1	7	2
24	DF	(Malaysia) MAS	Muslim Ahmad	34	2	19	1	7	0	8	1
30	DF	(Malaysia) MAS	Ashar Al-Aafiz	4	0	1+2	0	0+1	0	0	0
Midfielders
6	MF	(Malaysia) MAS	Hazri Rozali	0	0	0	0	0	0	0	0
7	MF	(Malaysia) MAS	Faisal Halim	22	3	1+15	3	2+3	0	0+1	0
8	MF	(Malaysia) MAS	Wan Zaharulnizam	31	2	13+4	1	3+3	1	3+5	0
11	MF	(Canada) CAN	Issey Nakajima-Farran	16	8	11	6	2	0	1+2	2
14	MF	(Malaysia) MAS	Faisal Rosli	29	0	16+2	0	7	0	4	0
17	MF	(Malaysia) MAS	Zuhair Aizat	10	1	1+2	0	0	0	1+6	1
20	MF	(Malaysia) MAS	Azam Azih	33	2	20	1	6	1	6+1	0
23	MF	(Malaysia) MAS	Salomon Raj	15	0	4+6	0	1	0	2+2	0
26	MF	(The Gambia) GAM	Mohamadou Sumareh	32	4	17	3	7	1	8	0
Forwards
9	FW	(Malaysia) MAS	Norshahrul Idlan	29	6	11+4	2	4+2	2	8	2
10	FW	(Brazil) BRA	Patrick Cruz	19	11	9	6	5+1	4	4	1
28	FW	(Malaysia) MAS	Kogileswaran Raj	16	1	6+6	1	1+1	0	0+2	0
29	FW	(Nigeria) NGA	Austin Amutu	18	5	9	3	3	1	6	1
Players transferred out during the season
3	DF	(Brazil) BRA	Alex Moraes	3	0	3	0	0	0	0	0
10	FW	(Liberia) LBR	Forkey Doe	5	5	3	5	2	0	0	0
11	FW	(Cambodia) CAM	Chan Vathanaka	12	1	10	1	2	0	0	0
29	FW	(Argentina) ARG	Sergio Unrein	1	0	0+1	0	0	0	0	0

Last updated: 29 September 2018
Source: Competitions

=== Clean sheets ===
Rnk	No.	Player	Super League	FA Cup	League Cup	Total
1	1	(Malaysia) Helmi Eliza	7	4	1	12
2	22	(Malaysia) Remezey Che Ros	0	0	1	1
