= Helmi Eliza =

Malaysian footballer

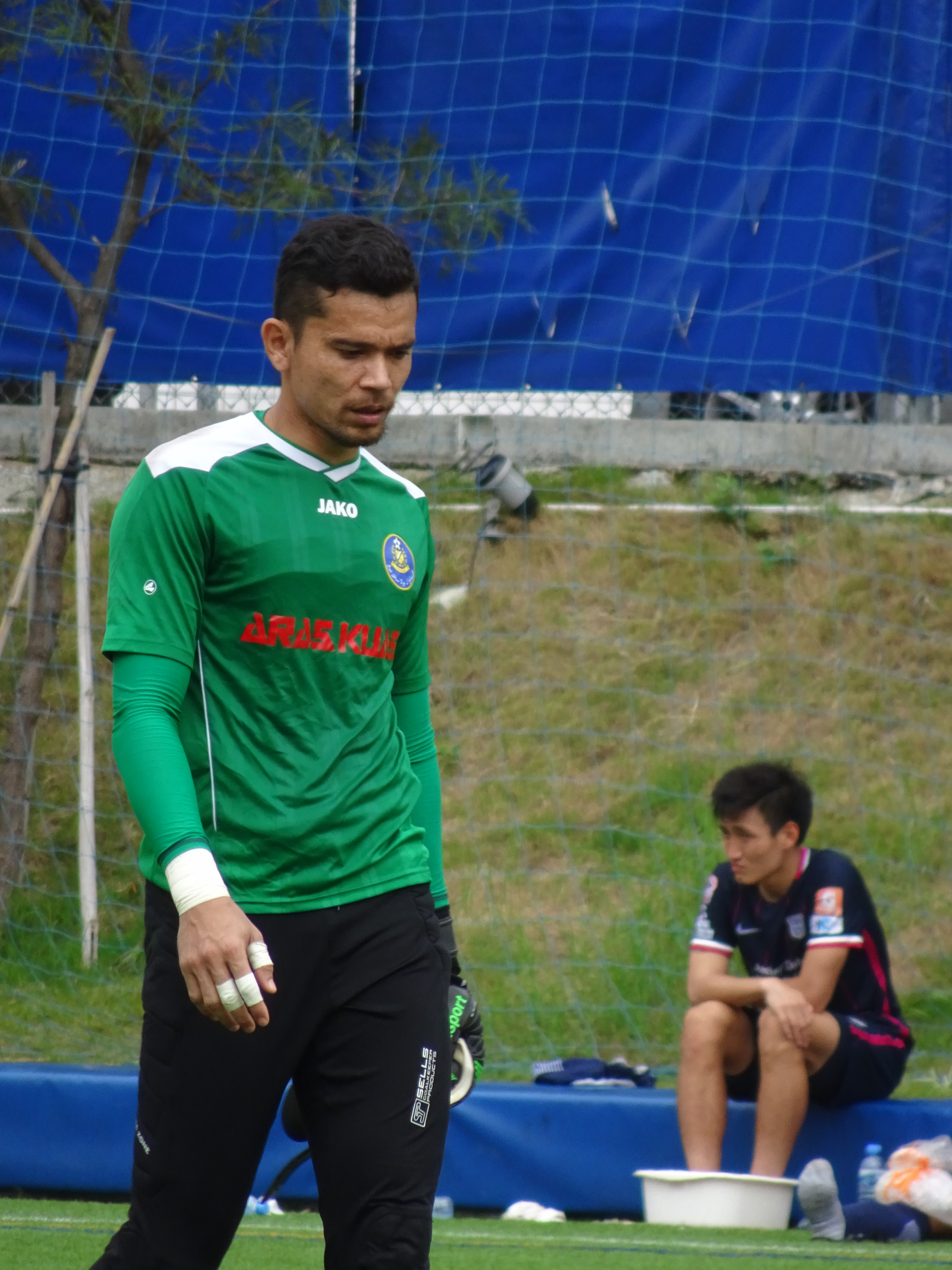

Personal information
- Full name: Mohamad Helmi Eliza bin Elias
- Date of birth: 20 January 1983 (age 43)
- Place of birth: Alor Setar, Malaysia
- Height: 1.78 m (5 ft 10 in)
- Position: Goalkeeper

Team information
- Current team: Kedah FA (assistant goalkeeper coach)

Youth career
- 2001: Kedah

Senior career*
Years	Team	Apps	(Gls)
2002–2012	Kedah		
2013	Felda United		
2014	PDRM		
2015	Negeri Sembilan		
2016–2021	Sri Pahang	65	(0)

International career^{‡}
2008	Malaysia	7	(0)

Managerial career
- 2024–2025: Kedah Darul Aman (Assistant Goalkeeper Coach)
- * Club domestic league appearances and goals as of 6 September 2021 ‡ National team caps and goals as of 25 January 2017 M

Mohamad Helmi Eliza bin Elias (born 20 January 1983) is a retired Malaysian footballer.

Helmi has won 2 FAM Football Awards 'Best Goalkeeper Award' in the 2006–2007 and the 2007–08 season. He has also won the Most Valuable Players' award in the 2007–08 season.

== Club career ==
Helmi was a product of Kedah's youth system and started in the junior, Kedah FA President Cup squad during the 2001 season, but it wasn't until 2006–07 that he debuted on the senior side, replacing Megat Amir Faisal Al Khalidi Ibrahim left for a new challenges with Selangor FA, and the disappointing performance of Jamsari Sabian also made Helmi became the first choice goalie in Kedah's starting line-up beginning from 20 December 2006 in Malaysia Super League match against Negeri Sembilan FA up until now.

The Malaysia FA Cup final on 30 June 2007 in Batu Kawan Stadium — Helmi helped Kedah FA win the second Malaysia FA Cup title after defeated Perlis FA. The match ended 0–0 and went to penalties, where Helmi saved two out of four penalties to gain the cup win with 4–2 result. After the match, he was awarded the "Man of the Match" award with a number of crucial saves in 120-minute play time.

On 23 August 2008, a few hours before the final Malaysia Cup 2007–08 reached its kick-off, Helmi was voted as the Most Popular Goalkeeper by fans in FAM Football Awards. He then conducted Kedah to retain Malaysia Cup after defeated Selangor 3–2.

On 5 August 2021, Helmi played his last professional match of his career at the age of 38 in the 2021 Malaysia Super League match for Sri Pahang against Penang where he played the entire match before deciding to retired from football at the end of the season.

== International career ==
On 6 June 2008, Helmi was selected as goalkeeper for B. Sathianathan's first match in charge, a friendly against Indonesia. It was Helmi's first start for Malaysia after making a debut for Malaysia youth in the early 2000s. Helmi has now firmly re-established himself as Malaysia's first choice goalkeeper, having started every match during Sathianathan's reign.

He also appeared for the Malaysia XI (also known as Malaysia B that represents Malaysia for non 'A' matches) squad against English Premier League giants Chelsea at Shah Alam Stadium on 29 July 2008. Helmi could not stop Nicolas Anelka and Ashley Cole putting the Blues ahead. Even though they lost, Helmi will be remembered for a spectacular diving save to deny Deco's thunderous 25-yard volley. Chelsea coach Luiz Felipe Scolari praised the Malaysia XI for giving a good fight against his team.

In the 2008 Merdeka Tournament, Helmi has not conceded any goals in 390 minutes of playing time after Malaysia beat Nepal and Sierra Leone 4–0 respectively in the group stage. Malaysia won 4–0 against Myanmar in the semi-final. Despite him not conceding after extra-time in the final against Vietnam, Helmi could not save any penalty kicks. As a result, it was Vietnam who came out victorious, beating Malaysia 6–5 in a sudden death penalty shoot-out after the teams had tied 0–0.

In 2008 AFF Suzuki Cup, Helmi was blamed by the media and fans because of his poor performance against Vietnam. In the match, Helmi conceded a long shot by Nguyen Vu Phong in the 86 minute as Malaysia lost 2–3 to Vietnam.

So far Helmi has played eight FIFA 'A' matches and three non 'A' matches for Malaysia.

== Career statistics ==
=== Club ===
As of 6 September 2021

Appearances and goals by club, season and competition
Club	Season	League			Cup		League Cup		Continental		Total	
Club	Season	Division	Apps	Goals	Apps	Goals	Apps	Goals	Apps	Goals	Apps	Goals
Sri Pahang	2016	Malaysia Super League	7	0	0	0	0	0	—		7	0
Sri Pahang	2017	Malaysia Super League	6	0	0	0	1	0	—		7	0
Sri Pahang	2018	Malaysia Super League	22	0	7	0	5	0	—		34	0
Sri Pahang	2019	Malaysia Super League	15	0	6	0	2	0	—		23	0
Sri Pahang	2020	Malaysia Super League	5	0	0	0	1	0	—		6	0
Sri Pahang	2021	Malaysia Super League	10	0	0	0	0	0	—		10	0
Sri Pahang	Total		65	0	13	0	9	0	0	0	87	0

=== International ===
As of 1 July 2018

Malaysia
Year	Apps	Goals
2008	7	0
Total	7	0

== Honours ==
=== Kedah ===
- Malaysia Super League: 2006–07, 2007–08
- Malaysia Premier League: 2002, 2005–06
- Malaysia FA Cup: 2007, 2008
- Malaysia Cup: 2007, 2008

=== Pahang ===
- Malaysia FA Cup: 2018

=== Individual ===
- Malaysia Super League 'Best Goalkeeper Award: 2006–2007, 2007–08
- FAM Football Awards – Most Malaysian Valuable Players: 2007–08
