= Dinesh Rajasingam =

Malaysian footballer

R. Dinesh
Personal information
- Full name: Dinesh a/l Rajasingam
- Date of birth: 13 February 1998 (age 28)
- Place of birth: Selangor, Malaysia
- Height: 1.71 m (5 ft 7 1/2 in)
- Position: Left-back

Team information
- Current team: Sabah
- Number: 13

Youth career
- 2012: CIMB-YFA
- Malaysia Pahang Sports School
- 2012–2015: Frenz United

Senior career*
Years	Team	Apps	(Gls)
2016–2020	Sri Pahang	27	(1)
2020–2022	Selangor	11	(0)
2023–	Sabah	7	(0)

International career^{‡}
2013–2014	Malaysia U-16	8	(0)
2016–2020	Malaysia U-23	6	(0)
- * Club domestic league appearances and goals as of 06 JUN 2023 ‡ National team caps and goals as of 28 January 2017

Dinesh a/l Rajasingam (born 13 February 1998) is a Malaysian professional footballer who plays as a left-back for Malaysia Super League club Sabah.

== Club career ==
=== Sri Pahang ===
Dinesh signed his professional contract with Sri Pahang in 2016. On 3 August 2016, he made his debut for the club in a 3–0 win over Kedah Darul Aman at Darulaman Stadium.

=== Selangor ===
On 15 December 2020, Dinesh completed his transfer to join Selangor after almost 5 years with Sri Pahang.

== Career statistics ==
=== Club ===
As of match played 30 November 2022

Appearances and goals by club, season and competition
Club	Season	League			Cup		League Cup		Continental		Total	
Club	Season	Division	Apps	Goals	Apps	Goals	Apps	Goals	Apps	Goals	Apps	Goals
Pahang	2016	Malaysia Super League	5	0	0	0	0	0	—		5	0
Pahang	2017	Malaysia Super League	2	0	1	0	0	0	—		3	0
Pahang	2018	Malaysia Super League	10	0	2	0	0	0	—		12	0
Pahang	2019	Malaysia Super League	2	0	1	0	0	0	—		3	0
Pahang	2020	Malaysia Super League	8	1	0	0	1	0	—		9	1
Pahang	Total		27	1	4	0	1	0	0	0	32	1
Selangor	2021	Malaysia Super League	11	0	0	0	0	0	—		11	0
Selangor	2022	Malaysia Super League	0	0	0	0	0	0	—		0	0
Selangor	Total		11	0	0	0	0	0	0	0	11	0
Career total			38	0	4	0	1	0	0	0	43	0

== Honours ==
Sri Pahang

- Malaysia FA Cup: 2018
