= Ashar Al Aafiz =

Malaysian footballer

Personal information
- Full name: Muhammad Ashar Al Aafiz bin Abdullah
- Date of birth: 28 March 1995 (age 31)
- Place of birth: Kuantan, Malaysia
- Height: 1.77 m (5 ft 10 in)
- Position: Center-back

Team information
- Current team: Sri Pahang FC
- Number: 13

Youth career
- 2013–2015: Sri Pahang U21

Senior career*
Years	Team	Apps	(Gls)
2016–	Sri Pahang	58	(0)
- * Club domestic league appearances and goals as of 1 September 2022

Muhammad Ashar Al Aafiz bin Abdullah (born 28 March 1995) is a Malaysian professional footballer who plays as a centre-back for Sri Pahang.

== Career statistics ==
=== Club ===
As of 1 September 2022

Club	Season	League		Cup		League Cup		Continental		Total	
Club	Season	Apps	Goals	Apps	Goals	Apps	Goals	Apps	Goals	Apps	Goals
Sri Pahang	2016	6	12	1	2	1	2	–		6	0
Sri Pahang	2017	1	0	0	0	1	0	–		2	0
Sri Pahang	2018	3	0	1	0	0	0	–		4	0
Sri Pahang	2019	3	0	0	0	0	0	–		3	0
Sri Pahang	2020	7	0	0	0	0	0	–		7	0
Sri Pahang	2021	17	0	0	0	0	0	–		17	0
Sri Pahang	2022	0	0	0	0	0	0	–		0	0
Sri Pahang	2023	0	0	0	0	0	0	–		0	0
Sri Pahang	Total	37	0	1	0	1	0	–		39	0
Career total		0	0	0	0	0	0	–		0	0
