= Safuwan Baharudin =

Singaporean professional footballer (born 1991)

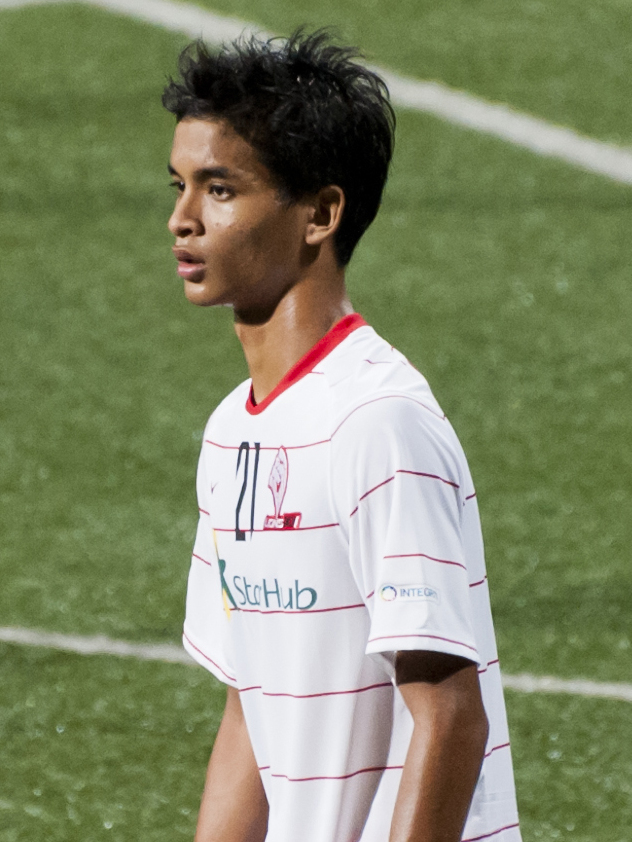
- Safuwan playing for LionsXII in 2012

Personal information
- Full name: Muhammad Safuwan bin Baharudin
- Date of birth: 22 September 1991 (age 35)
- Place of birth: Singapore
- Height: 1.83 m (6 ft 0 in)
- Positions: Centre-back; defensive midfielder

Team information
- Current team: Terengganu
- Number: 21

Youth career
- 2005–2009: National Football Academy

Senior career*
Years	Team	Apps	(Gls)
2009–2011	Young Lions	57	(9)
2012–2015	LionsXII	48	(10)
2015	→ Melbourne City (loan)	6	(2)
2016–2017	PDRM	35	(14)
2018–2019	Sri Pahang	36	(2)
2019–2022	Selangor	29	(1)
2023	Negeri Sembilan	11	(1)
2023–2026	Selangor	33	(0)
2025	→ Lion City Sailors (loan)	2	(0)
2026–	Selangor	0	(0)

International career^{‡}
2010–	Singapore	132	(14)
Medal record
Men's football
Representing Singapore
Sea Games
Bronze medal – third place	Sea Games 2009	Football
Bronze medal – third place	Sea Games 2013	Football
Asean Football Championship
Winner	AFF Suzuki Cup 2012	2012
- * Club domestic league appearances and goals as of 22 March 2025 ‡ National team caps and goals as of 18 November 2025

Muhammad Safuwan bin Baharudin (born 22 September 1991) is a Singaporean professional footballer who plays either as a centre-back or a defensive-midfielder for Malaysia Super League club Selangor and the Singapore national team. He is known for his aerial ability, powerful headers and defensive prowess.

Starting off his professional career as a centre-back, Safuwan's attributes and versatility also allow him to play as a right-back or defensive-midfielder when required.

== Club career ==
=== Early years ===
Safuwan started out playing as a striker during his Institute of Technical Education years and subsequently as a midfielder at the National Football Academy (NFA). Salim Moin, his NFA Under-17 coach, was credited with switching him to the centre-back position he currently plays in.

=== Young Lions ===
Safuwan began his professional football career with S.League club Young Lions in July 2009, after he was promoted from the National Football Academy Under-18s.

Safuwan was one of the Young Lions players that got involved in an on-pitch fight with several Beijing Guoan Talent players in their S.League match on 7 September 2010. He was charged by the FAS for gross misconduct and bringing the game into disrepute, and was fined S$2,000 for his part in the brawl.

=== LionsXII ===
In December 2011, the FAS announced that Safuwan will join the newly formed LionsXII in the 2012 Malaysia Super League. The LionsXII finished runners-up in their debut season.

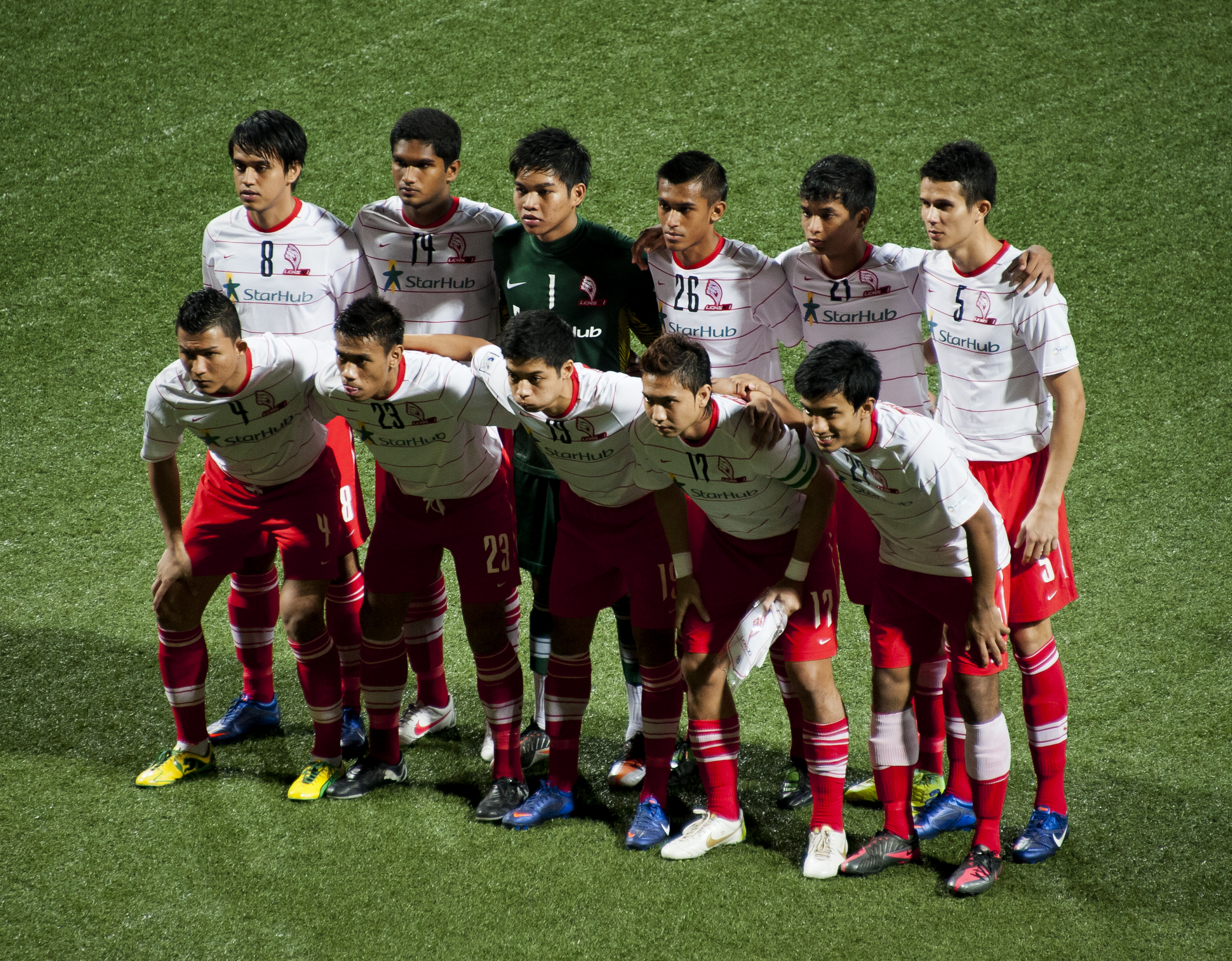
Safuwan in the starting eleven of LionsXII playing against Kuala Lumpur FA, 17 January 2012

Safuwan formed a strong understanding with Baihakki Khaizan in central defence as LionsXII won the 2013 Malaysia Super League with the competition's best defensive record. He contributed with five goals in 26 matches. Amid interest from Thai, Indonesian and rival Malaysia Super League sides including T-Team, he put pen to paper in a new two-year deal with LionsXII in November 2013.

Safuwan capped off his league performances by becoming the first male recipient of the annual Straits Times Athlete of the Year award in 2013.

Following the departure of regular defensive partner Baihakki in 2014, Safuwan formed a new partnership with new LionsXII recruit Afiq Yunos. He also showed his versatility with lauded displays in advanced midfield and attacking roles. Safuwan's performances up front and LionsXII's poor goal scoring form led to head coach Fandi Ahmad having to consider playing him as a forward in more games. Safuwan started in an advanced midfield role behind striker Khairul Amri in a Malaysia Super League match away to Sarawak on 15 March. On 25 March, he scored a late winner over Perak to send LionsXII up to 5th in the league table. He scored his second goal in as many games four days later as LionsXII drew 1–1 with T-Team and followed it up with the opener off a Shahfiq Ghani cross against Sime Darby on 5 April.

==== Loan to Melbourne City ====
On 29 January 2015, Safuwan signed a 3-month loan contract with A-League team Melbourne City.

Safuwan earned the contract after his standout performance at a MCFC's training camp in Abu Dhabi, which was held from 10 January 2015 to 19 January 2015. He attended the training camp as part of a development opportunity arranged with the FAS. The club substantiated the decision to take Safuwan on loan with his impressive performances during the training camp, both as a centre-back and as a full-back during the club's two friendly matches in the UAE. In the friendly matches, he was pitted against several notable players, such as former Juventus striker Mirko Vučinić. He played as a substitute in the side's second friendly match with Ukrainian Premier League outfit Dnipro Dnipropetrovsk, with the match concluding in a 1–1 result.

Safuwan made his debut for Melbourne City in the A-League on 7 February 2015 in the Melbourne Derby against Melbourne Victory. Safuwan scored his first goal for the club against Adelaide United on 27 February 2015. He scored his second goal just a couple of weeks later, against Western Sydney Wanderers to hand his side a 1–0 lead although they could not hang onto the lead and crash to a 3–2 defeat in the end. Following a spine injury that he sustained in a competitive match against Wellington Phoenix, Safuwan's loan contract was allowed to lapse and was not renewed, despite earlier rumours stating that the club was interested in offering him a permanent contract. After his release, Safuwan returned to play for the LionsXII in the 2015 Malaysia Super League season.

In July 2015, it was reported that there was interest from J1 League club Yokohama F Marinos to sign Safuwan on loan for the rest of the season. Although Safuwan stated that he was open to a second move overseas, even if it was on a short-term contract, the move ultimately did not materialise, and Safuwan remained with the LionsXII.

=== PDRM FA ===
Upon the dismissal of LionsXII from the Malaysia Super League following the end of the 2015 season, Safuwan was linked with multiple Malaysian and Thai football clubs upon noting his potential availability. Safuwan signed a one-year loan deal with PDRM FA for the 2016 Malaysia Super League season in January 2016 but however was made permanent. The transfer fee was initially estimated as being about S$45,000, but was found later to be closer to S$32,000. This deal was extended for a year despite PDRM FA's relegation into the Malaysian Premier League.

=== Pahang FA ===
On 19 November 2017, Safuwan signed a contract with Malaysian Super League runners-up Pahang FA and was presented alongside Malaysian forward, Norshahrul Idlan. He scored his first goal in a 2–1 victory against ATM FA in the 2018 Malaysia FA Cup. During his time with Pahang, he helped the club win the 2018 Malaysia FA Cup Final before being released at the end of the 2019 Malaysia Super League season despite being contracted until 2020.

=== Selangor ===
On 12 December 2019, Safuwan signed for Selangor for the 2020 Malaysia Super League season, ensuring that he will be playing in Malaysia for the 9th season. Safuwan made his debut for the club in the opening match of the 2020 Malaysia Super League season against his former club, Pahang on 29 February 2020. He scored his first goal for the club on 3 October in a 7–0 thrashing win against one of his former club, PDRM.

During the league match against Petaling Jaya City on 2 May 2021, Safuwan suffered a cerebral concussion after a collision with an opponent where he was taken to Ara Damansara Hospital after being removed from the match to get a computer tomography scan. After examination, Safuwan was confirmed not to have suffered any brain injury and only had to undergo symptomatic treatment for a few months until he fully recovered. He returned to action on 21 August in a league match against Perak where he will need to wear a protective helmet for a year.

Before the start of the 2022 Malaysia Super League season, Safuwan was named as vice captain of Selangor. On 28 June 2022, he took another knock to his head during a match against Sabah, and was later diagnosed with a mild traumatic brain injury which rules him out for the season.

=== Negeri Sembilan ===
On 22 February 2023, Safuwan joined Negeri Sembilan on a free transfer and signed a six-month deal. He made his debut later that month in a 1–1 home draw against Sri Pahang in their first game of the 2023 Malaysia Super League season. On 14 May 2023, he scored his first goal for the club, and scored the winner in 87th-minute in a 2–1 victory against Kuala Lumpur City.

Following on his expiring contract on 30 June 2023, Safuwan confirmed he would not be re-signing for Negeri Sembilan, in preference for a move to another Malaysian club, or another top-flight foreign club in Thailand. He ending his six-month association with the club.

=== Return to Selangor ===
On 13 July 2023, Safuwan returned to Selangor, joining the club on a short-term deal. Two days later, he made his first official appearance on his return to the club in a 3–0 win over Penang in the league match.

Safuwan was than named as the club captain ahead of the 2024–25 season. During the 2024 Malaysia FA Cup second leg against Terengganu on 3 August 2024, Safuwan scored his first hat-trick for the club where he score 2 header goals in the 3rd and 5th minute of the match after a cross from teammate Yohandry Orozco from the corner. In the 53rd minute, he scored with his weak foot which secured his hat-trick. Selangor went on to win 6–4 on aggregate thus qualifying to the 2024 Malaysia FA Cup final. On 19 September, Safuwan make his AFC Champions League Two debut in a 1–1 draw to Thailand club Muangthong United.

==== Loan to Lion City Sailors ====
After being told that Safuwan would not be part of Selangor's new head coach Katsuhito Kinoshi plans, Safuwan returned to Singapore on 6 July 2025 after nearly 14 years. He joined Singapore Premier League club Lion City Sailors on loan until the end of the year. However, his loan deal was cut short on 8 December after reaching a mutual agreement after Safuwan requested an early end to the loan arrangement to settle personal matters in Kuala Lumpur ahead of his return to Selangor in January 2026.

== International career ==
=== Youth ===
Safuwan was part of the Singapore U23 team that won the bronze medal at the 2009 and 2013 Southeast Asian Games.

=== Senior ===
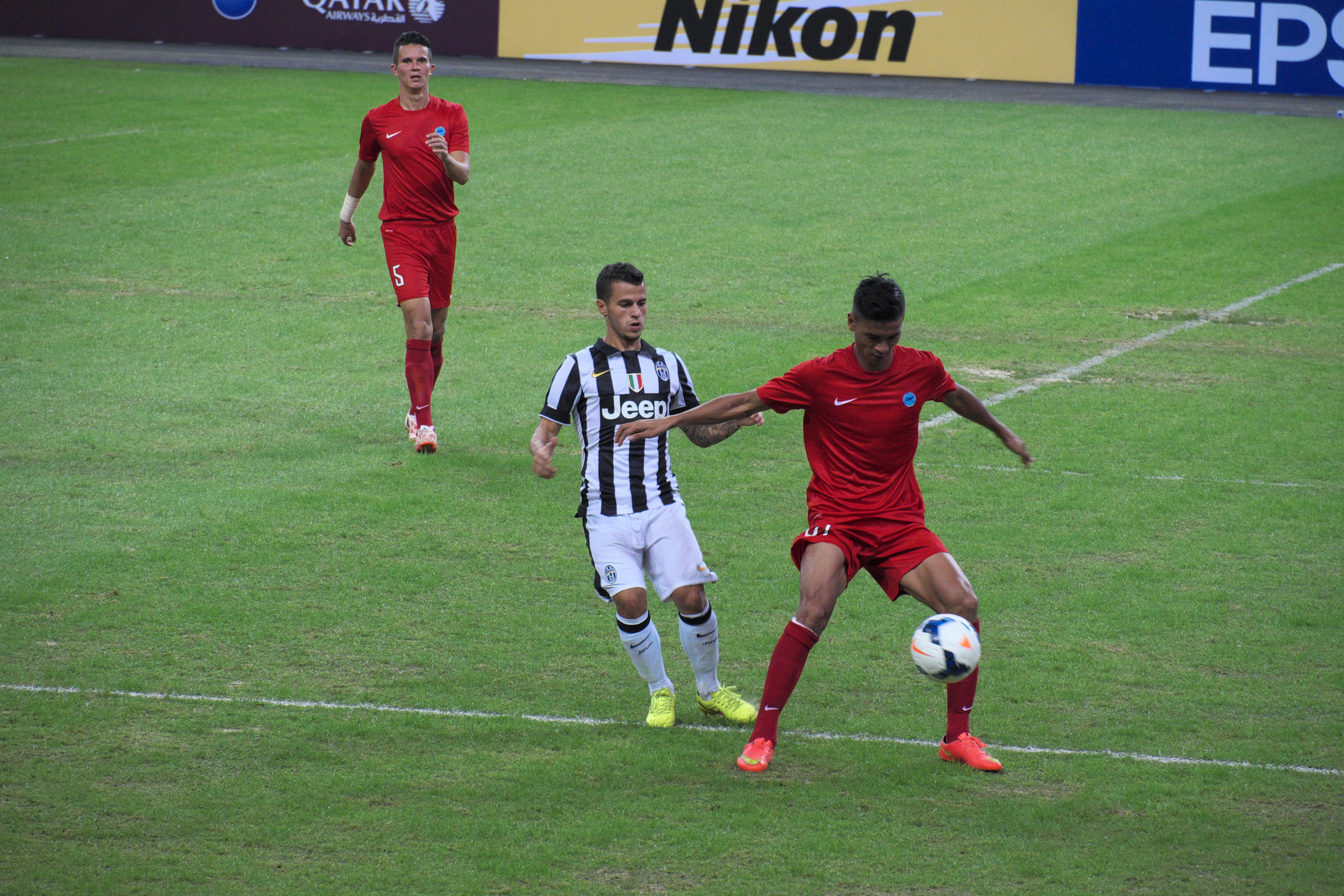
Safuwan keeping the ball off Sebastian Giovinco of Juventus in a pre-season friendly on 16 August 2014

Safuwan made his international debut for Singapore at the age of 19 in a King's Cup match against Thailand on 17 January 2010.

Safuwan contributed to Singapore's then-record fourth ASEAN Football Championship win in 2012. He found himself increasingly paired with Baihakki Khaizan as regular centre-back Daniel Bennett was gradually phased out of the national team set-up.

On 31 August 2017, Safuwan scored from the penalty spot to help Singapore snatch a draw against Hong Kong.

Safuwan scored his first international hat-trick on 21 November 2018, helping Singapore to a 6-1 demolition of Timor-Leste in the 2018 AFF Championship.

Safuwan made his 100 caps for the national team on 14 December 2021 against Timor-Leste in the 2020 AFF Championship.

On 16 November 2023, Safuwan returned to the Singapore squad since June 2022 during the 2026 FIFA World Cup qualifications match against South Korea.

=== Singapore Selection ===
Apart from national team commitments, Safuwan was also part of the Singapore Selection XI squad on several occasions. The selected squad are made up of current Singapore international footballers, as well as players currently participating in the S.League. Safuwan has appeared in all four matches that the Singapore Selection XI has played thus far, such as in the Peter Lim Charity Cup match against 2013–14 La Liga champions Atlético Madrid, a pre-season friendly match against Juventus, as well as in the 2015 Barclays Asia Trophy against Arsenal and Stoke City held in Singapore at the National Stadium.

== Personal life ==
Safuwan is born to Baharudin Abdul Ghani and Suria Haniffa. Safuwan married Alia Qistina, an air stewardess, in 2013.

Safuwan was the first Singaporean to be featured in FIFA 15.

== Career statistics ==
=== Club ===
As of match played 21 April 2025

Club	Season	S.League		Singapore Cup		Singapore League Cup		Asia		Total	
Club	Season	Apps	Goals	Apps	Goals	Apps	Goals	Apps	Goals	Apps	Goals
Young Lions	2009	15	1	0	0	0	0	—		15	1
Young Lions	2010	26	4	5	0	0	0	—		31	4
Young Lions	2011	16	4	—		—		—		16	4
Young Lions	Total	57	9	5	0	0	0	0	0	62	9
Club	Season	Malaysia Super League		Malaysia FA Cup		Malaysia Cup		Asia		Total	
LionsXII	2012	13	3	2	0	4	1	—		19	4
LionsXII	2013	18	3	1	0	7	2	—		26	5
LionsXII	2014	17	4	2	1	0	0	—		19	5
LionsXII	2015	TBC						—		TBC	TBC
LionsXII	Total	48	10	5	1	11	3	0	0	64	14
Club	Season	A-League		FFA Cup				Asia		Total	
Melbourne City (loan)	2014–15	6	2	—				—		6	2
Melbourne City (loan)	Total	6	2	—				—		6	2
Club	Season	Malaysia Super League		Malaysia FA Cup		Malaysia Cup		Asia		Total	
PDRM	2016	16	3	4	1	8	3	—		28	7
PDRM	2017	19	11	1	0	1	0	—		21	11
PDRM	Total	35	14	5	1	9	3	0	0	49	18
Sri Pahang	2018	19	2	6	1	0	0	—		25	3
Sri Pahang	2019	17	0	5	0	0	0	—		22	0
Sri Pahang	Total	36	2	11	1	0	0	0	0	47	3
Selangor	2020	11	1	—		1	0	—		12	1
Selangor	2021	13	0	—		6	1	—		19	1
Selangor	2022	5	0	1	1	0	0	—		6	1
Selangor	Total	29	1	0	1	7	1	0	0	37	3
Negeri Sembilan	2023	11	1	1	0	0	0	—		12	1
Negeri Sembilan	Total	11	1	1	0	0	0	0	0	12	1
Selangor	2023	8	0	0	0	3	1	—		11	1
Selangor	2024–25	19	0	6	3	5 (Note: 2 Appearances in Malaysia Cup & 3 in Challenge Cup)	1	3 (Note: 3 Appearances in AFC Champions League Two)	0	33	4
Selangor	Total	27	0	6	3	8	2	3	0	44	5
Club	Season	Singapore Premier League		Singapore Cup		Singapore League Cup		Asia		Total	
Lion City Sailors	2025–26	0	0	0	0	0	0	0	0	0	0
Career total		249	39	34	7	35	9	3	0	321	55

- Young Lions and LionsXII are ineligible for qualification to AFC competitions in England their respective leagues.

=== International ===
Scores and results list Singapore's goal tally first.

No	Date	Venue	Opponent	Score	Result	Competition
1.	7 June 2013	New Laos National Stadium, Vientiane, Laos	Laos	3–0	5–2	Friendly
2.	17 November 2014	Yishun Stadium, Yishun, Singapore	Cambodia	4–2	4–2	Friendly
3.	11 June 2015	Phnom Penh Olympic Stadium, Phnom Penh, Cambodia	Cambodia	2–0	4–0	2018 FIFA World Cup qualification
4.	11 June 2015	Phnom Penh Olympic Stadium, Phnom Penh, Cambodia	Cambodia	3–0	4–0	2018 FIFA World Cup qualification
5.	17 November 2015	National Stadium, Kallang, Singapore	Syria	1–1	1–2	2018 FIFA World Cup qualification
6.	1 September 2016	Bahrain National Stadium, Riffa, Bahrain	Bahrain	1–1	1–3	Friendly
7.	31 August 2017	Jalan Besar Stadium, Kallang, Singapore	Hong Kong	1–1	1–1	Friendly
8.	21 November 2018	National Stadium, Kallang, Singapore	Timor-Leste	1–0	6–1	2018 AFF Championship
9.	21 November 2018	National Stadium, Kallang, Singapore	Timor-Leste	2–1	6–1	2018 AFF Championship
10.	21 November 2018	National Stadium, Kallang, Singapore	Timor-Leste	6–1	6–1	2018 AFF Championship
11.	10 September 2019	Jalan Besar Stadium, Kallang, Singapore	Palestine	2–1	2–1	2022 FIFA World Cup qualification
12.	5 December 2021	National Stadium, Kallang, Singapore	Myanmar	1–0	3–0	2020 AFF Championship
13.	29 March 2022	National Stadium, Kallang, Singapore	Philippines	1–0	2–0	Friendly
14.	31 May 2026	Jalan Besar Stadium, Kallang, Singapore	Mongolia	1–0	4–0	Friendly

== Honours ==
=== Club ===
LionsXII

- Malaysia Super League: 2013
- Malaysia FA Cup: 2015

Pahang FA

- Malaysia FA Cup: 2018

Lion City Sailors

- Singapore Community Shield runner-up: 2025

=== International ===
Singapore

- ASEAN Football Championship: 2012
- Southeast Asian Games: bronze medal – 2009, 2013

=== Individual ===
- 2014 Singapore Sports Awards: Meritorious Award
- 2013 Goal Singapore Football Awards: Singapore Player of the Year
- The Straits Times Athlete of the Year: 2013
- Goal.com-Nike 2012 ASEAN Football Championship Under-23 Player of the Tournament
- Goal.com 2012 ASEAN Football Championship Best XI
- 2011 S.League People's Choice Award
- ASEAN Football Federation Best XI: 2019

== See also ==
- List of men's footballers with 100 or more international caps
