= Salamon Raj =

Malaysian footballer

Personal information
- Full name: Salamon Raj a/l Adaickalam
- Date of birth: 23 March 1994 (age 32)
- Place of birth: Selangor, Malaysia
- Height: 1.68 m (5 ft 6 in)
- Position: Defensive midfielder

Team information
- Current team: Petaling Jaya City
- Number: 23

Youth career
- 2012—2015: Selangor U21

Senior career*
Years	Team	Apps	(Gls)
2016–2019	Sri Pahang	37	(1)
2020–	Petaling Jaya City	24	(0)
- * Club domestic league appearances and goals as of 12 September 2021

Salamon Raj a/l Adaickalam (born 23 March 1994) is a Malaysian professional footballer who plays as a defensive midfielder for Petaling Jaya City.

== Career statistics ==
=== Club ===
As of match played 12 September 2021

Club	Season	League		Cup		League Cup		Continental		Total	
Club	Season	Apps	Goals	Apps	Goals	Apps	Goals	Apps	Goals	Apps	Goals
Sri Pahang	2016	19	1	2	0	0	0	–		21	1
Sri Pahang	2017	5	0	2	1	1	0	–		8	1
Sri Pahang	2018	10	0	1	0	4	0	–		15	0
Sri Pahang	2019	3	0	1	0	0	0	–		4	0
Sri Pahang	Total	37	1	6	1	5	0	–		48	2
Petaling Jaya City	2020	5	0	–						5	0
Petaling Jaya City	2021	19	0	0	0	0	0	–		19	0
Petaling Jaya City	Total	24	0	0	0	0	0	–		24	0
Career total		0	0	0	0	0	0	–		0	0

== Honours ==
Sri Pahang

- Malaysia FA Cup: 2018
