= Nik Sharif Haseefy =

Malaysian association football player

Personal information
- Full name: Nik Muhammad Sharif Haseefy bin Mohd Lazim
- Date of birth: 30 May 1997 (age 29)
- Place of birth: Kuantan, Pahang, Malaysia
- Height: 1.68 m (5 ft 6 in)
- Position: Midfielder

Team information
- Current team: Terengganu
- Number: 88

Youth career
- 2014–2018: Sri Pahang U21

Senior career*
| Years | Team | Apps | (Gls) |
| 2018–2020 | Sri Pahang | 11 | (3) |
| 2021–2022 | Selangor | 5 | (0) |
| 2022 | → Terengganu (loan) | 18 | (2) |
| 2023–2025 | Terengganu | 28 | (3) |
| 2025–2026 | Immigration | | |
| 2026– | Terengganu | | |
- * Club domestic league appearances and goals

Nik Muhammad Sharif Haseefy bin Mohd Lazim (born 30 May 1997) is a Malaysian professional footballer who plays as a midfielder for Malaysia Super League club Terengganu.

== Club career ==
=== Pahang ===
Born in Kuantan, Pahang, Sharif began his career with Pahang academy or youth team before being promoted to the senior team in 2018. He made his professional debut on 25 June 2019 in a 2–5 loss at away to Selangor F.C. On 26 September 2020, Sharif scored his first senior goal against Kedah. He made 10 appearances in the second season and scored 3 goals.

=== Selangor ===
On 19 December 2020, Sharif completed transfer Selangor.

=== Terengganu ===
On 30 May 2022, Sharif joined Terengganu on a half-year loan. On 27 December 2022, Sharif completed a permanent transfer to Terengganu, signing a two-year contract.

== Career statistics ==
=== Club ===
As of match played 30 November 2022

Appearances and goals by club, season and competition
| Club | Season | League | | | Cup (Note: Includes Malaysia FA Cup) | | League Cup (Note: Includes Malaysia Cup) | | Continental (Note: Includes AFC Champions League and AFC Cup) | | Total | |
| Club | Season | Division | Apps | Goals | Apps | Goals | Apps | Goals | Apps | Goals | Apps | Goals |
|---|---|---|---|---|---|---|---|---|---|---|---|---|
| Pahang | 2019 | Malaysia Super League | 2 | 0 | 0 | 0 | 0 | 0 | — | | 2 | 0 |
| Pahang | 2020 | Malaysia Super League | 9 | 3 | 0 | 0 | 1 | 0 | — | | 10 | 3 |
| Pahang | Total | | 11 | 3 | 0 | 0 | 1 | 0 | 0 | 0 | 12 | 3 |
| Selangor | 2021 | Malaysia Super League | 4 | 0 | 0 | 0 | 4 | 1 | — | | 8 | 1 |
| Selangor | 2022 | Malaysia Super League | 1 | 0 | 0 | 0 | 0 | 0 | — | | 1 | 0 |
| Selangor | Total | | 5 | 0 | 0 | 0 | 4 | 1 | 0 | 0 | 9 | 1 |
| Terengganu (loan) | 2022 | Malaysia Super League | 18 | 2 | 3 | 0 | 5 | 1 | — | | 26 | 3 |
| Terengganu (loan) | Total | | 18 | 2 | 3 | 0 | 5 | 1 | 0 | 0 | 26 | 3 |
| Terengganu | 2023 | Malaysia Super League | 14 | 2 | 3 | 0 | 6 | 1 | 4 | 0 | 27 | 2 |
| Terengganu | 2024–25 | Malaysia Super League | 14 | 1 | 2 | 0 | 3 | 0 | 5 | 1 | 24 | 2 |
| Terengganu | Total | | 28 | 3 | 5 | 0 | 9 | 1 | 9 | 1 | 51 | 4 |
| Career total | | | 62 | 8 | 8 | 0 | 19 | 3 | 9 | 1 | 98 | 12 |

== Honours ==
Terengganu FC

- Malaysia Super League runner-up: 2022
- Malaysia FA Cup runner-up: 2022
- Malaysia Charity Shield runner-up: 2023
- Malaysia Cup runner-up: 2023
