= Austin Amutu =

Nigerian footballer

Personal information
- Full name: Austin Iwuji Ammachi Augustine Amutu
- Date of birth: 20 February 1993 (age 33)
- Place of birth: Jos, Nigeria
- Height: 1.86 m (6 ft 1 in)
- Position: Striker

Youth career
- 2008: Karamone

Senior career*
Years	Team	Apps	(Gls)
2009–2011	Mighty Jets	44	(11)
2011–2015	Warri Wolves	51	(12)
2015–2016	→ Kelantan FA (loan)	14	(8)
2016	Ironi Kiryat Shmona	14	(5)
2016–2017	Yeni Malatyaspor	20	(3)
2018	ES Zarzis	9	(0)
2018–2019	Pahang	13	(5)
2019–2022	Al Masry	85	(18)
2022–2023	Al Ittihad Alexandria	27	(3)
2023–2024	Al-Jandal	12	(1)
2024–2025	Al-Talaba SC	34	(7)
- * Club domestic league appearances and goals

Austin Iwuji Ammachi Augustine Amutu (born 20 February 1993), known as Austin Amutu, is a Nigerian professional footballer who plays as a forward.

== Club career ==
Amutu started his playing career with youth team Karamone, later joined Mighty Jets of Jos where he had his break out.

In April 2015, Amutu signed a loan deal from Warri Wolves to Malaysian club Kelantan during April transfer window. He impressed the fan after scored a goal in the 9th minutes of his debut game against Johor Darul Ta'zim F.C. in which they lost 1-3.

On 2 August 2023, Amutu joined Al-Jandal. He was released by the club on 17 January 2024.

== International career ==
He was only called up to Nigeria U-23 dream team VI squad at the 2015 Nigeria Super 6 Tournament.

== Career statistics ==
=== Club ===
As of 1 July 2018.

Club	Season	League		Cup		League Cup		Continental		Total	
Club	Season	Apps	Goals	Apps	Goals	Apps	Goals	Apps	Goals	Apps	Goals
Pahang	2018	4	1	2	1	0	0	–		6	2
Pahang	Total	4	1	2	1	0	0	–		6	2
Career total		0	0	0	0	0	0	–		0	0
