= Daniel Wafiuddin =

Malaysian footballer

Personal information
- Full name: Muhammad Daniel Wafiuddin bin Sa'dun
- Date of birth: 16 March 1997 (age 29)
- Place of birth: Kuala Rompin, Malaysia
- Height: 1.74 m (5 ft 9 in)
- Position: Goalkeeper

Team information
- Current team: Melaka
- Number: 18

Youth career
- 2016–2017: Sri Pahang U21

Senior career*
Years	Team	Apps	(Gls)
2016–2018	Sri Pahang		
2019	UKM	2	(0)
2020–2023	Sri Pahang		
2023–	Melaka		
- * Club domestic league appearances and goals

Muhammad Daniel Wafiuddin bin Sa'dun (born 16 March 1997) is a Malaysian professional footballer who plays as a goalkeeper for Melaka.

== Club career ==
=== Sri Pahang ===
Having previously played for Sri Pahang youth team. Daniel has been promoted to the first team in 2016.

Daniel joined Sri Pahang for a second stint after his contract with UKM expired in December 2019.

On 21 August 2021, Daniel made his debut for the club during league match in 0–2 defeat to Kuala Lumpur City.

=== UKM ===
On 4 February 2019, Daniel made his competitive debut for UKM in their Malaysia Premier League match against Perlis. The club won by 2–1.
