= Mudzar Mohamad =

Malaysian footballer

Personal information
- Full name: Mudzar bin Mohamad
- Date of birth: 20 January 1966 (age 60)
- Place of birth: Pekan, Pahang, Malaysia
- Position: Goalkeeper

Team information
- Current team: YPM FC (GK coach)

Senior career*
Years	Team	Apps	(Gls)
1986–2001	Pahang FA		

International career
1996–1999	Malaysia		
1996	Malaysia futsal		
- * Club domestic league appearances and goals

Mudzar Mohamad, sometimes spelt Muadzar Mohamad, (born 20 January 1966) is a former Malaysian footballer who was a goalkeeper for Pahang and the Malaysia national football team.

== Career ==
Mudzar starts his football career with Pahang in 1986. A year before, he had played for his local team Bukit Setongkol, and win a local district championship. Scouts for Pahang FA noticed his talent, and offered him a trial for the team. He started playing for the team in the Kings Gold Cup (Piala Emas Raja-Raja in Malay) tournament. He played for Pahang for the entire of his career.

During his time with Pahang, he faced stiff competition for the main goalkeeper position, mainly from Khairul Azman Mohamed who was also his competitor in the Malaysia national football team. After Khairul transferred to Sabah FA in 1996, he was installed as the first choice goalkeeper by head coach Yunus Alif. He retired in 2001 following a career-ending injury.

He also played for Malaysia national futsal team, and was in the squad that took part in the 1996 FIFA Futsal World Championship in Spain.

== Coaching career ==
After retired from playing football, Mudzar turned into coaching, and appointed the goalkeeper coach of Pahang in 2003. Later he resigned from this position, but returned again to Pahang in 2007. He is currently Pahang's goalkeeper coach.

== Personal life ==
Mudzar is married, having 3 children with his wife Zainun Harun, 40. He also has a restaurant, which he managed together with his wife in Kuantan.

== Achievements ==
=== International ===
- Runners-up Tiger Cup 1996

=== Club ===
With Pahang FA

- Champion 1992 Malaysia Cup
- Runners-up 1994, 1995, 1997 Malaysia Cup
- Champion 1995 M-League
