= Norshahrul Idlan =

Malaysian footballer

Personal information
- Full name: Norshahrul Idlan bin Talaha
- Date of birth: 8 June 1986 (age 40)
- Place of birth: Besut, Malaysia,
- Height: 1.72 m (5 ft 8 in)
- Position: Forward

Youth career
- 1998–2002: Perak

Senior career*
Years	Team	Apps	(Gls)
2003–2006	Perak		
2006–2007	Negeri Sembilan		
2007–2009	UPB-MyTeam		(14)
2010–2012	Kelantan	69	(36)
2013–2014	Johor Darul Ta'zim	39	(8)
2015	ATM	5	(1)
2015–2016	Terengganu	30	(2)
2017	Felda United	19	(4)
2018–2019	Pahang	36	(5)
2020–2021	BG Pathum United	6	(0)
2022	Sarawak United	16	(4)
2023	Melaka United	12	(0)
2024	Harini FT	22	(7)

International career^{‡}
2003–2004	Malaysia U-21	10	(2)
2006–2007	Malaysia U-23	14	(5)
2007–2021	Malaysia	81	(14)
Medal record
Men's football
Representing Malaysia
AFF Championship
Winner	2010
Runner-up	2014
Runner-up	2018
Southeast Asian Games
First place	2009
Merdeka Tournament
Winner	2007
- * Club domestic league appearances and goals ‡ National team caps and goals as of 19 November 2019

Norshahrul Idlan bin Talaha (born 8 June 1986) is a Malaysian former professional footballer who played as a forward. From 2007 to 2022, he represented the Malaysia national team. He is most popularly known as Mat Yo by Malaysian football fans.

== Career ==
=== Perak ===
Norshahrul was born in Besut, Terengganu. His talent in football started at Sekolah Rendah Kebangsaan Jertih, Terengganu, where he rose up to represent Terengganu in the National Schools Sports Council of Malaysia tournament (MSSM football tournament) in 1998. Later, he attended his secondary education at Sekolah Sukan Bukit Jalil from form 1 to form 5. He was involved in most national under-age groups' teams and youth levels before Perak FA secured him a professional contract in 2004.

=== UPB-MyTeam ===
He later signed by the newly created club, UPB-MyTeam FC. He was one of the team's key players and score 16 goals in all competition for the club.

=== Kelantan ===
Norshahrul join Kelantan in late 2009. He was part of their 2010 Malaysia Cup-winning team. Norshahrul won two awards at the 2010 Anugerah Bola Sepak Kebangsaan 100Plus-FAM as the Best Forward and Most Valuable Player. He won three times in a row 2010,2011 and 2012 for Anugerah Bolasepak Kebangsaan 100Plus-FAM and Piala Supermokh Best Forward.

=== Johor Darul Ta'zim ===
After spending three years in Kota Bharu, Norshahrul left the Kelantanese outfit to join Johor Darul Ta'zim (JDT) for an undisclosed fee. He was the highest-scoring local player throughout the season.

=== Armed Forces ===
Norshahrul joined ATM FA for the 2015 season, after leaving Johor Darul Takzim FC at the conclusion of his contract at the end of 2014. He was reunited with his former coach back when he was in Kelantan, B. Sathianathan.

=== Terengganu ===
After only 3 months with ATM FA, Norshahrul encountered problems with the payment of his salary. He signed with Terengganu for the remaining of 2015 Malaysia Super League season.

=== Felda United ===
Norshahrul signed with Felda United after spending two years with Terengganu.

=== Pahang ===
After a disappointing deal with Felda United, he went on to sign with Malaysian Super League runners up Pahang. He won Piala Fa Cup 2018.

=== BG Pathum United ===
After released by Pahang, he signed a one-year contract with BG Pathum United for 2020 Thai League 1 season. With BG Pathum, he created history by becoming the first Malaysian professional footballer to won a first division league title in Thailand.

=== Melaka United ===
In 2022 Norshahrul joined Melaka United on a 1-year deal. Melaka United also failed to settle salary for 6 months.

=== Harini FT ===
In 2023 at the age of 37, Norshahrul made a sensational move to second-tier side Malaysia M3 League Harini FT as one of the ex Malaysia national team players to join a semi-pro league. In a 2023 Malaysia Cup Round of 16 fixtures against Sri Pahang on 4 August 2023, Norshahrul scored the equaliser that level the game at 2–2 but unfortunately felt to a last minute goal where it would ended up in a 3–2 defeat. First local player won cup Champions E-games.

== International career ==
Norshahrul has played for the Malaysia national youth team for 2004 AFC Youth Championship. He win Best Player and Top Scorer Nike Cup in Thailand. Against Nepal during the tournament as Malaysia made it to the quarter finals. He is also one of the Malaysia under 23 players that won the 2007 Pestabola Merdeka. He made his full international debut against Bahrain on 28 October 2007 after coming in for Sumardi Hajalan.

On 12 July 2009, Norshahrul scored his first senior international goals in an unofficial match against Uganda. He later score his first full international goal against Lesotho on 11 September 2009.

In November 2010, Norshahrul was called up to the Malaysia national squad by coach K. Rajagopal for the 2010 AFF Suzuki Cup. Norshahrul scored 2 goals for Malaysia that time, one was a 5–1 loss against Indonesia and a 5–1 victory against Laos. Malaysia won the 2010 AFF Suzuki Cup title for the first time in their history.

On 9 December 2012, he scored a goal for Malaysia against Thailand in 2012 AFF Suzuki Cup, as Malaysia failed to retain the title having lost to Thailand on aggregate in the semi-finals.

Norshahrul was again included by new coach Dollah Salleh for the 2014 AFF Suzuki Cup squad, and played in all of Malaysia games as Malaysia advanced into the finals, only to be denied of the title by Thailand. Norshahrul scored one goal in the tournament, against Vietnam in the semi-final second leg.

== Career statistics ==
=== Club ===
As of match played 6 October 2023

Club performance			League		Cup		League Cup		Others		Total	
Season	Club	League	Apps	Goals	Apps	Goals	Apps	Goals	Apps	Goals	Apps	Goals
2003	Perak	Malaysia Premier League 1		0		0		0	–			0
2004	Perak	Malaysia Super League		0		0		0	–			0
2005	Perak	Malaysia Super League		0		0		0	–			0
2005–06	Perak	Malaysia Super League		0		0		0	–			0
Total				0		0		0	–			0
2006–07	Negeri Sembilan	Malaysia Super League		0		0		0	6	0		
Total				0		0		0	6	0		0
2007–08	UPB-MyTeam	Malaysia Super League		4		0		0	–			4
2009	UPB-MyTeam	Malaysia Super League		10		0		2	–			12
Total				14		0		2	–			16
2010	Kelantan	Malaysia Super League	23	11	2	0	9	3	–		34	14
2011	Kelantan	Malaysia Super League	25	19	7	2	8	4	–		40	25
2012	Kelantan	Malaysia Super League	21	6	3	1	11	3	3	0	38	10
Total			69	36	12	3	28	10	3	0	112	49
2013	Johor Darul Takzim FC	Malaysia Super League	21	7	7	0	8	4	–		36	11
2014	Johor Darul Takzim FC	Malaysia Super League	18	1	4	1	8	0	–		30	2
Total			39	8	11	1	16	4	–		66	13
2015	ATM	Malaysia Super League	5	1	1	0	–		–		6	1
Total			5	1	1	0	–		–		6	1
2015	Terengganu	Malaysia Super League	13	1	3	1	3	0	–		19	2
2016	Terengganu	Malaysia Super League	17	1	1	0	5	1	–		23	2
Total			30	2	4	1	8	1	–		42	4
2017	Felda United	Malaysia Super League	19	4	1	0	8	0	5	1	33	5
Total			19	4	1	0	8	0	5	1	33	5
2018	Pahang	Malaysia Super League	15	2	6	2	8	2	–		29	6
2019	Pahang	Malaysia Super League	11	3	2	0	6	0	–		19	3
Total			26	5	8	2	14	2	–		48	9
2020	BG Pathum United	Thai League 1	6	0	0	0	0	0	–		6	0
Total			6	0	0	0	0	0	–		6	0
2021	Sarawak United	Malaysia Premier League	16	4	–		1	0	–		17	4
Total			16	4	–		1	0	–		17	4
2022	Melaka United	Malaysia Super League	12	0	3	2			–		15	2
Total			12	0	3	2	–		–		15	2
2023	Harini FT	Malaysia M3 League	22	7	–		2	1	2	0	26	8
Total			22	7	–		2	1	2	0	26	8

=== International ===
As of 28 May 2021

Malaysia national team
Year	Apps	Goals
2007	1	0
2009	7	5
2010	9	8
2011	4	0
2012	13	3
2013	6	3
2014	11	2
2015	1	0
2016	5	0
2017	0	0
2018	11	7
2019	12	4
2022	2	0
Total	82	31

==== International goals ====
Scores and results list Malaysia's goal tally first.

No.	Date	Venue	Opponent	Score	Result	Competition
	12 July 2009	Kuala Lumpur Stadium, Kuala Lumpur, Malaysia	Zimbabwe^{1}	4–0	4–0	Friendly
1.	11 September 2009	Petaling Jaya Stadium, Petaling Jaya, Malaysia	Lesotho	2–0	5–0	Friendly
2.	1 December 2010	Bung Karno Stadium, Jakarta, Indonesia	Indonesia	1–0	1–5	2010 AFF Championship
3.	7 December 2010	Gelora Sriwijaya Stadium, Palembang, Indonesia	Laos	4–1	5–1	2010 AFF Championship
4.	9 December 2012	Bukit Jalil National Stadium, Kuala Lumpur, Malaysia	Thailand	1–0	1–1	2012 AFF Championship
5.	15 October 2013	Shah Alam Stadium, Shah Alam, Malaysia	Bahrain	1–1	1–1	2015 AFC Asian Cup qualification
6.	11 December 2014	Mỹ Đình National Stadium, Hanoi, Vietnam	Vietnam	2–0	4–2	2014 AFF Championship
7.	12 October 2018	Sugathadasa Stadium, Colombo, Sri Lanka	Sri Lanka	1–1	4–1	Friendly
8.	8 November 2018	Olympic Stadium, Phnom Penh, Cambodia	Cambodia	1–0	1–0	2018 AFF Championship
9.	12 November 2018	Bukit Jalil National Stadium, Kuala Lumpur, Malaysia	Laos	2–1	3–1	2018 AFF Championship
10.	12 November 2018	Bukit Jalil National Stadium, Kuala Lumpur, Malaysia	Laos	3–1	3–1	2018 AFF Championship
11.	24 November 2018	Bukit Jalil National Stadium, Kuala Lumpur, Malaysia	Myanmar	1–0	3–0	2018 AFF Championship
12.	5 December 2018	Rajamangala Stadium, Bangkok, Thailand	Thailand	2–2	2–2	2018 AFF Championship
13.	7 June 2019	Bukit Jalil National Stadium, Kuala Lumpur, Malaysia	Timor-Leste	3–0	7–1	2022 FIFA World Cup qualification
14.	5 October 2019	Bukit Jalil National Stadium, Kuala Lumpur, Malaysia	Sri Lanka	3–0	6–0	Friendly

^{1} FIFA revoked the ‘A’ international classification for the matches once it was discovered that a Zimbabwean club team, Monomotapa United impersonated as the Zimbabwe national team and were not approved by the Zimbabwe Football Association.

=== U-23 team ===
==== Appearances in major competitions ====
Competition	App.	Goals	Team Result
2008 AFC Men's Pre-Olympic Tournament	1	0	Second round
2007 SEA Games	3	0	Group stage
2009 SEA Games	6	3	Winners
2010 Asian Games	4	2	Round of 16

== Honours ==
=== Club ===
Kelantan FA

- Malaysia Super League (2): 2011, 2012
- Malaysia FA Cup: 2012
- Malaysia Cup (2): 2010, 2012
- Sultan Haji Ahmad Shah Cup: Winners (1): 2011

Johor Darul Takzim

- 2014 Malaysia Super League: Winner
- 2014 Malaysia Cup: Runner Up
- 2013 Malaysia FA Cup: Runner Up

Pahang FA

- 2018 Malaysia FA Cup: Winner

BG Pathum United

- 2020–21 Thai League 1: Winner

=== International ===
- 2007 Pestabola Merdeka: Winner
- 2009 SEA Games: Gold
- 2010 AFF Suzuki Cup: Winner
- 2014 AFF Suzuki Cup: Runner Up
- 2018 AFF Suzuki Cup: Runner Up

=== Individual ===
- 2010 Anugerah Bola Sepak Kebangsaan 100Plus-FAM: the Best Forward and Most Valuable Player
- 2011 Anugerah Bola Sepak Kebangsaan 100Plus-FAM: the Best Forward and Most Valuable Player
- 2012 Anugerah Bola Sepak Kebangsaan 100Plus-FAM: the Best Forward and Most Valuable Player
- Goal.com monthly Asian Best XI (Subs): January 2012
- 2018 AFF Championship: Best Eleven
- ASEAN Football Federation Best XI: 2019
