= Afif Amiruddin =

Malaysian footballer

Personal information
- Full name: Mohd Afif bin Amiruddin
- Date of birth: 22 March 1984 (age 42)
- Place of birth: Kelantan, Malaysia
- Height: 1.88 m (6 ft 2 in)
- Position: Defender

Youth career
- –2005: Kelantan (President Cup)

Senior career*
| Years | Team | Apps | (Gls) |
| 2006 | Kelantan | | |
| 2007–2008 | PDRM | | |
| 2009–2010 | Kedah | | |
| 2010–2015 | PDRM | | |
| 2012–2013 | → Sime Darby (loan) | | |
| 2015–2016 | Perlis | | |
| 2017–2019 | Pahang | 30 | (1) |

International career^{‡}
| 2014– | Malaysia | 9 | (0) |
Medal record
Malaysia
AFF Championship
| Runner-up | AFF Suzuki Cup 2014 | 2014 |
- * Club domestic league appearances and goals as of 26 June 2019 ‡ National team caps and goals as of 25 January 2017

Mohd Afif bin Amiruddin (born 22 March 1984) is a Malaysian footballer who plays as a defender for Pahang in the Malaysia Super League.

== Club career ==
Afif has also played for Kedah FA (where he has played Malaysia Super League and AFC Cup matches) and Kelantan.

He made his debut for the Malaysia national football team in a friendly against Indonesia on 14 September 2014.

== International appearances ==
| # | Date | Venue | Opponent | Score | Result | Competition |
|---|---|---|---|---|---|---|
| 1 | 14 September 2014 | Sidoarjo, Indonesia | Indonesia | 0 | 0–2 (L) | Friendly |
| 2 | 16 November 2014 | Hanoi, Vietnam | Vietnam | 0 | 3–1 (L) | Friendly |
| 3 | 23 November 2014 | Jalan Besar, Singapore | Myanmar | 0 | 0–0 (D) | 2014 AFF Suzuki Cup |
| 4 | 26 November 2014 | Jalan Besar, Singapore | Thailand | 0 | 2–3 (L) | 2014 AFF Suzuki Cup |
| 5 | 11 December 2014 | Mỹ Đình National Stadium, Vietnam | Vietnam | 0 | 2–4 (W) | 2014 AFF Suzuki Cup |
| 6 | 20 December 2014 | Bukit Jalil Stadium, Malaysia | Thailand | 0 | 3–2 (W) | 2014 AFF Suzuki Cup |
| 7 | 26 March 2015 | Al-Seeb Stadium, Oman | Oman | 0 | 0–6 (L) | Friendly |

== Career statistics ==
=== Club ===
As of 1 July 2018.

Appearances and goals by club, season and competition
| Club | Season | League | | | Cup | | League Cup | | Continental | | Total | |
| Club | Season | Division | Apps | Goals | Apps | Goals | Apps | Goals | Apps | Goals | Apps | Goals |
|---|---|---|---|---|---|---|---|---|---|---|---|---|
| Pahang | 2017 | Malaysia Super League | 18 | 1 | 5 | 0 | 6 | 2 | – | | 29 | 3 |
| Pahang | 2018 | Malaysia Super League | 7 | 0 | 4 | 0 | 0 | 0 | – | | 11 | 0 |
| Pahang | Total | | 25 | 1 | 9 | 0 | 6 | 2 | 0 | 0 | 40 | 3 |
| Career total | | | 0 | 0 | 0 | 0 | 0 | 0 | 0 | 0 | 0 | 0 |

=== International ===
As of 1 July 2018

Malaysia
| Year | Apps | Goals |
|---|---|---|
| 2014 | 5 | 0 |
| 2015 | 3 | 0 |
| 2017 | 1 | 0 |
| Total | 9 | 0 |

== Honours ==
=== Club ===
PDRM

- Malaysia Premier League: 2014

=== International ===
Malaysia

- AFF Suzuki Cup: Runner-up 2014
