= Hazri Rozali =

Malaysian association football player

Personal information
- Full name: Mohd Hazri bin Rozali
- Date of birth: 26 June 1986 (age 40)
- Place of birth: Pahang, Malaysia
- Height: 1.63 m (5 ft 4 in)
- Position: Central midfielder

Team information
- Current team: Sri Pahang
- Number: 16

Youth career
- Sri Pahang

Senior career*
Years	Team	Apps	(Gls)
2011–2015	Sri Pahang	19	(0)
2016–2017	Melaka United	0	(0)
2018–	Sri Pahang	22	(0)
- * Club domestic league appearances and goals as of 1 September 2021

Mohd Hazri bin Rozali (born 26 June 1986) is a Malaysian footballer who plays as a central midfielder for Sri Pahang.
