= Darul Makmur Stadium =

Stadium in Kuantan, Pahang, Malaysia

Darul Makmur Stadium Stadium Darul Makmur
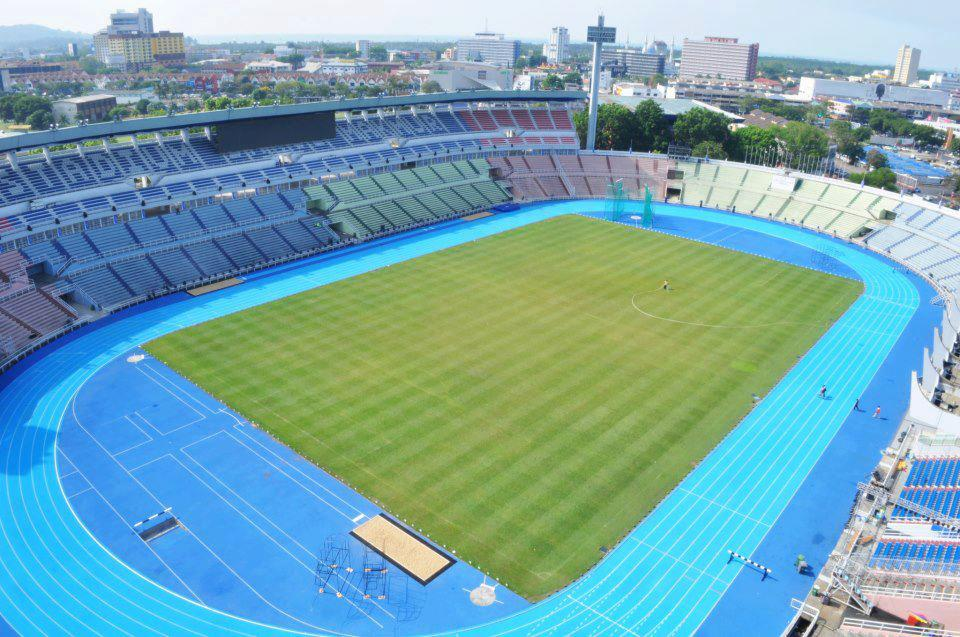
- Darul Makmur Stadium
- Interactive map of Darul Makmur Stadium; Stadium Darul Makmur
- Location: Kuantan, Pahang, Malaysia
- Coordinates: 3°48′53″N 103°19′26″E
- Owner: State Government of Pahang
- Operator: Perbadanan Stadium Darul Makmur
- Capacity: 40,000
- Surface: Bermuda grass, track
- Scoreboard: LED
- Field size: 105 m × 68 m (344 ft × 223 ft)

Construction
- Opened: 1973; 53 years ago
- Renovated: 1995, 2011, 2024–2025
- Cost: RM 26.7 million
- Architects: Liew Kok Hee SB. Arch, Pahang State PWD Architect

Tenants
- Sri Pahang (1970–2024); Kuantan FA (2013–2017); Pahang Amateur League (selected matches); Piala Remaja (selected matches); YPM (2025–present)

Darul Makmur Stadium (Malay: Stadium Darul Makmur) is a multi-purpose stadium located in Kuantan, Pahang, Malaysia. It is mostly used for football matches, with a capacity of 40,000 people. The stadium has a running track, in addition to the football field. It was opened in 1970, while capacity was increased after renovations in 1995 in conjunction with Kuantan hosting the Sukma Games in 1996 and 2012.

== International football matches ==
Date	Competition	Team 1	Res.	Team 2
18 February 2004	2006 FIFA World Cup qualification – AFC second round	Malaysia	1–3	Hong Kong
31 March 2004	2006 FIFA World Cup qualification – AFC second round	Malaysia	0–2	Kuwait

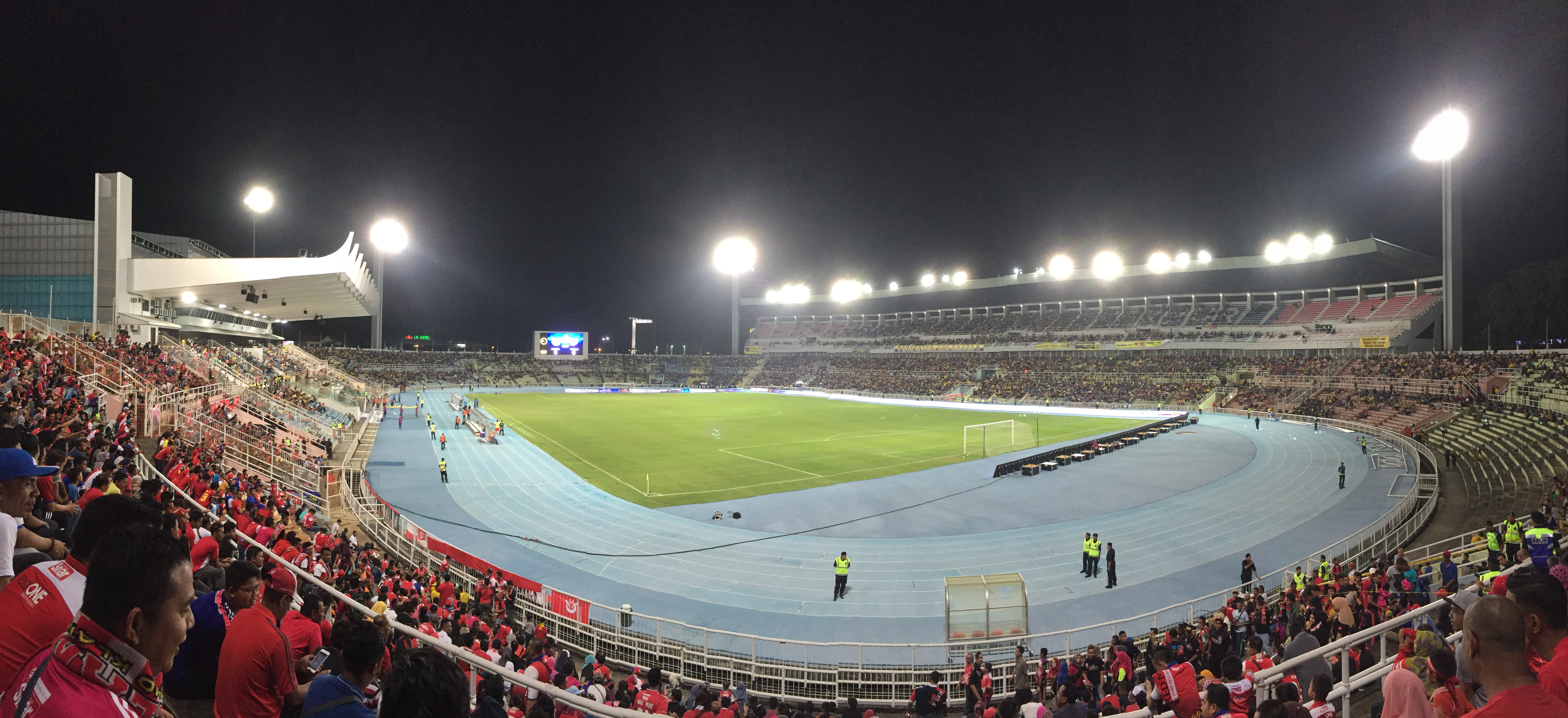
The interior of the Darul Makmur Stadium.

== See also ==
- Sport in Malaysia
- List of football stadiums in Malaysia
- Lists of stadiums
