= Remezey Che Ros =

Malaysia footballer

Mohd Remezey
Personal information
- Full name: Mohd Remezey bin Che Ros
- Date of birth: 6 September 1982 (age 44)
- Place of birth: Kuantan, Pahang
- Height: 1.81 m (5 ft 11 in)
- Position: Goalkeeper

Team information
- Current team: Raub
- Number: 35

Youth career
- Pahang President's Team

Senior career*
Years	Team	Apps	(Gls)
2004–2005	PDRM		
2005–2009	Pahang		
2010–2011	Kuala Lumpur	17	(0)
2012–2014	PKNS	8	(0)
2015–2016	Penang		
2016	PKNS		
2017	Kuala Lumpur	7	(0)
2018–2020	Pahang		
2025	Raub	5	(0)
- * Club domestic league appearances and goals

Mohd Remezey bin Che Ros (born 1982 in Kuantan) is a Malaysian professional footballer who play as a goalkeeper for Malaysia A2 Amateur League club Raub.
