= Zuhair Aizat =

Malaysian footballer

Personal information
- Full name: Muhammad Zuhair Aizat bin Mohd Nazri
- Date of birth: 1 October 1996 (age 30)
- Place of birth: Pahang, Malaysia
- Height: 1.63 m (5 ft 4 in)
- Position: Midfielder

Team information
- Current team: Raub
- Number: 77

Youth career
- Sri Pahang

Senior career*
Years	Team	Apps	(Gls)
2016–2023	Sri Pahang	41	(2)
2024–2025	PDRM	0	(0)
2025–	Raub		
- * Club domestic league appearances and goals as of 1 September 2022

Muhammad Zuhair Aizat bin Mohd Nazri (born 1 October 1996) is a Malaysian footballer who plays as a midfielder for Malaysia A2 Amateur League club Raub.

== Honours ==
Sri Pahang

- Malaysia FA Cup: 2018; runner-up: 2017
- Malaysia Super League runner-up: 2017, 2018
