= 2021 Melaka United F.C. season =

3rd season in the Malaysia Super League

Melaka United
2021 season
- President: Datuk Sulaiman Md Ali
- Manager: Yusoff Mahadi
- Head coach: Zainal Abidin Hassan
- Stadium: Hang Jebat Stadium (capacity:40,000)
- Malaysia Super League: 8th
- Malaysia Cup: Semi-finals
- Top goalscorer: League: Stefan Nikolić; S. Kumaahran (4); All: Sony Norde (8)
- Highest home attendance: 0
- Lowest home attendance: 0
- Average home league attendance: 0
Home colours	Away colours	Third colours

The 2021 season was Melaka United Football Club's 97th season in club history and 5th season in the Malaysia Super League.

== Kits ==
- Supplier: al-Ikhsan
- Main sponsors: RedOne
- Other sponsors: Restoran Melayu, Hatten Groups

Home	Away	Alternate	Goalkeeper	Goalkeeper

== Management team ==
Position	Name
Head coach	(Malaysia) Zainal Abidin Hassan
Assistant head coaches	(Malaysia) Asri Ninggal
Assistant head coaches	(Malaysia) Md Noor Md Derus
Goalkeeper coach	(Malaysia) Mazlan Wahid
Fitness coach	(Malaysia) Norhudahiroshi Razak
Physiotherapist	(Malaysia) Rozairen Hairudin
Physiotherapist	(Malaysia) Fakhrusy Syakirin

== Players ==
No.	Name	Nationality	Date of birth (age)	Signed from	Since	Contract ends
Goalkeepers
1	Solehin Mamat	(Malaysia)	24 March 1996 (age 29)	(Malaysia) Kuala Lumpur City	2019	2021
19	Khairul Fahmi (captain)	(Malaysia)	7 January 1989 (age 37)	(Malaysia) Kelantan	2018	2022
22	Norazlan Razali	(Malaysia)	19 December 1985 (age 40)	(Malaysia) Felda United	2019	2021
Defenders
2	Che Rashid	(Malaysia)	17 December 1994 (age 31)	(Malaysia) Johor Darul Ta'zim II	2021	
3	Akmal Zahir	(Malaysia)	16 February 1994 (age 31)	(Malaysia) UKM	2020	2021
6	Jang Suk-won	(South Korea)	11 August 1989 (age 36)	(South Korea) Seongnam (K1)	2019	2021
11	Syamim Yahya	(Malaysia)	17 May 1990 (age 35)	(Malaysia) Terengganu	2020	
13	Razman Roslan	(Malaysia)	14 August 1984 (age 41)	(Malaysia) Selangor	2019	2021
15	Khairul Anwar	(Malaysia)	9 October 1990 (age 35)	(Malaysia) Terengganu	2020	
18	Wan Amirul Afiq	(Malaysia)	18 July 1992 (age 33)	(Malaysia) Felda United	2019	2020
24	Farid Azmi	(Malaysia)	23 March 1994 (age 31)	(Malaysia) Sarawak United	2021	2021
25	Faris Shah	(Malaysia)	17 April 1995 (age 30)	(Malaysia) Kelantan	2018	2020
28	Amirul Hamer	(Malaysia)	27 February 1998 (age 27)	Youth team	2020	
31	Khairul Helmi	(Malaysia)	31 March 1988 (age 37)	(Malaysia) Kedah Darul Aman	2021	
35	Hasbullah Abu Bakar	(Malaysia)	26 October 1994 (age 31)	(Malaysia) Johor Darul Ta'zim II	2021	
Midfielders
7	Wan Zaharulnizam	(Malaysia)	8 May 1991 (age 34)	(Malaysia) Kelantan	2021	
8	Manny Ott	(Philippines) (Germany)	6 May 1992 (age 33)	(Philippines) United City (P1)	2021	
10	Sony Norde	(Haiti)	27 July 1989 (age 36)	(Azerbaijan) Zira (A1)	2020	
14	Fakhrullah Rosli	(Malaysia)	8 January 1991 (age 35)	(Malaysia) SAMB	2020	
20	Faizal Talib	(Malaysia)	28 July 1997 (age 28)	Youth team	2019	
21	Gary Steven Robbat	(Malaysia)	3 September 1992 (age 33)	(Malaysia) Johor Darul Ta'zim II	2021	
23	Jasmir Mehat	(Malaysia)	6 February 1994 (age 32)	(Malaysia) SAMB	2020	
30	Shyamierul Razmee	(Malaysia)	20 March 1998 (age 27)	(Malaysia) SAMB	2020	
Forwards
9	Giovane Gomes	(Brazil)	20 March 1995 (age 30)	(Brazil) Caxias (B4)	2021	2021
12	Kumaahran Sathasivam	(Malaysia)	3 July 1996 (age 29)	(Malaysia) Pahang	2021	2021
17	Hazim Abu Zaid	(Malaysia)	17 January 2001 (age 25)	Youth team	2020	
27	Adriano	(Brazil)	30 August 1994 (age 31)	(Brazil) Galves (B4)	2021	2021
Players who left during the season
9	Alex	(Brazil)	20 May 1990 (age 35)	(Indonesia) Persikabo 1973 (I1)	2021	
90	Stefan Nikolić	(Montenegro)	16 April 1990 (age 35)	(Bosnia and Herzegovina) Krupa (B1)	2021	

== Transfers ==
=== Transfers in ===
Pre-season

Pos.	Player	Transferred from	Fee	Ref.
DF	(Malaysia) Farid Azmi	(Malaysia) Sarawak United	Free transfer	
FW	(Brazil) Casagrande	(Malaysia) Penang	Loan return	
DF	(Malaysia) Khairul Helmi	(Malaysia) Kedah Darul Aman	Free transfer	
MF	(Malaysia) Wan Zaharulnizam Zakaria	(Malaysia) Kelantan	Free transfer	
MF	(Philippines) (Germany) Manny Ott	(Philippines) United City	Free transfer	
FW	(Malaysia) S.Kumaahran	(Malaysia) Johor Darul Ta'zim II	Season loan	
DF	(Malaysia) Che Rashid	(Malaysia) Johor Darul Ta'zim II	Season loan	
DF	(Malaysia) Hasbullah Abu Bakar	(Malaysia) Johor Darul Ta'zim II	Season loan	
FW	(Brazil) Alex	(Indonesia) Persikabo 1973	Free transfer	
FW	(Montenegro) Stefan Nikolić	(Bosnia and Herzegovina) Krupa	Free transfer	

Mid-season

Pos.	Player	Transferred from	Fee	Ref.
MF	(Malaysia) Gary Steven Robbat	(Malaysia) Johor Darul Ta'zim II	Season loan	
FW	(Brazil) Giovane Gomes	(Brazil) Caxias	Season loan	
FW	(Brazil) Adriano	(Brazil) Galvez	Season loan	

=== Transfers out ===
Pre-season

Pos.	Player	Transferred to	Fee	Ref.
DF	(Malaysia) Nurridzuan Abu Hassan	Unattached		
DF	(Malaysia) Annas Rahmat	(Malaysia) Negeri Sembilan	Free transfer	
DF	(Malaysia) (Australia) Curran Singh Ferns	Unattached		
DF	(Malaysia) (New Zealand) Khair Jones	Unattached		
DF	(Malaysia) Mohd Aizulridzwan Razali	Unattached		
DF	(Malaysia) Lee Yong Cheng	Unattached		
MF	(Malaysia) Saiful Ridzuan	(Malaysia) Negeri Sembilan	Free transfer	
MF	(Malaysia) Deevan Raj	(Malaysia) Negeri Sembilan	Free transfer	
MF	(Malaysia) Safiq Rahim	(Malaysia) Johor Darul Ta'zim	Free transfer	
MF	(Colombia) Romel Morales	(Malaysia) Kuala Lumpur City	Free transfer	
FW	(Brazil) Casagrande	(Malaysia) Penang	Free transfer	
FW	(Nigeria) Uche Agba	(Malaysia) Sarawak United	Free transfer	
FW	(Malaysia) Ferris Danial	(Malaysia) Negeri Sembilan	Free transfer	
FW	(Malaysia) Ramzi Haziq	Unattached		

Mid-season

Pos.	Player	Transferred to	Fee	Ref.
FW	(Brazil) Alex	(Indonesia) Persita Tangerang	Free transfer	
FW	(Montenegro) Stefan Nikolić	Unattached		

=== Extension of contract ===
Pos.	Player	Notes	Ref.
GK	(Malaysia) Khairul Fahmi	2 years signed in 2021	
GK	(Malaysia) Solehin Mamat		
GK	(Malaysia) Norazlan Razali		
DF	(South Korea) Jang Suk-won		
DF	(Malaysia) Faris Shah		
DF	(Malaysia) Wan Amirul Afiq		
DF	(Malaysia) Razman Roslan		
MF	(Haiti) Sony Norde		
MF	(Malaysia) Syamim Yahya		

== Friendlies ==
=== Pre-season ===
JDT Invitation Cup (19-25 February 2021)

19 February 2021 1	Terengganu (Malaysia)	1–1	(Malaysia) Melaka United	Iskandar Puteri
				Stadium: Sultan Ibrahim Stadium

21 February 2021 2	Johor Darul Ta'zim (Malaysia)	2–3	(Malaysia) Melaka United	Iskandar Puteri
				Stadium: Sultan Ibrahim Stadium

23 February 2021 3	Johor Darul Ta'zim II (Malaysia)	1–3	(Malaysia) Melaka United	Iskandar Puteri
				Stadium: Sultan Ibrahim Stadium

26 February 2021 Finals	Johor Darul Ta'zim (Malaysia)	3–0	(Malaysia) Melaka United	Iskandar Puteri
				Stadium: Sultan Ibrahim Stadium

Others

28 February 2021 1	Melaka United (Malaysia)	2–1	(Malaysia) Kelantan	Krubong
	Fakhrullah 14', 43'		7' (pen.)	Stadium: Hang Jebat Stadium

Mid-season

17 July 2021 1	Melaka United (Malaysia)	3–2	(Malaysia) Selangor	Krubong
	Norde 9'; Giovane Gomes 16', 25'		Olusegun 63' (pen.); Nik Sharif 87' (pen.)	Stadium: Hang Jebat Stadium

== Competitions ==
=== Malaysia Super League ===
==== Fixtures and results ====
6 March 2021 1	Melaka United	1–1	Sabah	Krubong
21:00 UTC+8	Kumaahran 62'		Hamran Peter 45'	Stadium: Hang Jebat Stadium; Referee: Khirulazuan Kidam

9 March 2021 2	Petaling Jaya City	2–2	Melaka United	Petaling Jaya
21:00 UTC+8	Darren 70', 85' (pen.); Raffi (yellow card) 30'; Rajes (yellow card) 90'		Kumaahran 55'; Faris 90+5'; Afiq (yellow card) 73'; Syamim (yellow card) 83'	Stadium: Petaling Jaya Stadium; Referee: Hamdan Awang

13 March 2021 3	Melaka United	0–0	Sri Pahang	Krubong
21:00 UTC+8			Wague (yellow card) 24'	Stadium: Hang Jebat Stadium; Referee: Mohd Nafeez Abdul Wahab

17 March 2021 4	Terengganu	1–1	Melaka United	Kuala Nerus
21:00 UTC+8	Mintah 66'		Alex 9' (pen.)	Stadium: Sultan Mizan Zainal Abidin Stadium; Referee: Noor Azriel

20 March 2021 5	Melaka United	2–1	Kuala Lumpur City	Krubong
21:00 UTC+8	Alex 51' (pen.), 91' (pen.)		Azim 89'	Stadium: Hang Jebat Stadium; Referee: Mohd Shahrizan Mohamad Solihim

2 April 2021 6	Johor Darul Ta'zim	3–0	Melaka United	Iskandar Puteri
21:00 UTC+8	Adam 3'; Bergson 8', 82'; Hariss (yellow card) 58'		Syamim (yellow card) 63'; Afiq (yellow card) 68'	Stadium: Sultan Ibrahim Stadium; Referee: Razlan Joffri Ali

6 April 2021 7	Melaka United	1–2	Penang	Krubong
21:00 UTC+8	Nikolić 62'; Razman (yellow card) 46'		Casagrande 39', 48'; Latiff (yellow card) 71'; Utomo (yellow card) 77'	Stadium: Hang Jebat Stadium; Referee: Tuan Mohd Yaasin Tuan Mohd Hanafiah

10 April 2021 8	UiTM	0–3	Melaka United	Shah Alam
21:00 UTC+8			Norde 36'; Nikolić 60'; Kumaahran 65'	Stadium: UiTM Stadium; Referee: Mohd Nafeez Abd Wahab

18 April 2021 9	Melaka United	2–3	Selangor	Krubong
21:00 UTC+8	Faris (yellow card) 16'; Nikolić 45+3' (pen.), (yellow card) 68'; Syamim 59'; Fakhrullah (yellow card) 87'		Olusegun 51', 70'; Konrad (yellow card) 62'; Syahmi 88'	Stadium: Hang Jebat Stadium; Referee: Hamdan Awang

25 April 2021 10	Perak	0–1	Melaka United	Ipoh
22:00 UTC+8	Idris (yellow card) 44'; Danish (yellow card) 65'; Shakir (yellow card) 84'		Zaharulnizam 61'; Kumaahran (yellow card) 25'; Afiq (yellow card) 58'; Norde (yellow card) 87'	Stadium: Perak Stadium; Referee: Razlan Joffri Ali

30 April 2021 11	Melaka United	1–3	Kedah Darul Aman	Krubong
21:00 UTC+8	Nikolić (yellow card) 15', (goal) 37' (pen.); Syamim (yellow card) 72'; Razman (yellow card) 73'		Sherman 18' (pen.), 62'; Baddrol 87'; Ariff (yellow card) 45+1'	Stadium: Hang Jebat Stadium; Referee: Tuan Mohd Yaasin Tuan Mohd Hanafiah

5 May 2021 12	Sabah	3–1	Melaka United	Kota Kinabalu
21:15 UTC+8	Amri 6', 47'; Azzizan 16'		Fakhrullah 65'	Stadium: Likas Stadium; Referee: Zulkarnain Zakaria

9 May 2021 13	Melaka United	0–0	Petaling Jaya City	Krubong
22:00 UTC+8	Syamim (yellow card) 63'; Hasbullah (yellow card) 70'		Filemon (yellow card) 40'; Prabakaran (yellow card) 49'; Mahalli (yellow card) 88'	Stadium: Hang Jebat Stadium; Referee: Mohd Nafeez Abd Wahab

25 July 2021 14	Sri Pahang	1–1	Melaka United	Kuantan
21:00 UTC+8	Hidalgo 1'		Zaharulnizam 90+7'; Akmal (yellow card) 69'	Stadium: Darul Makmur Stadium; Referee: S. Logeswaran

28 July 2021 15	Melaka United	2–0	Terengganu	Krubong
21:00 UTC+8	Norde 36', (yellow card) 51'; Adriano 77'; Kumaahran (yellow card) 81'	Report	Carli de Murga (yellow card) 19'; Azam (yellow card) 41'; Arif (yellow card) 68'	Stadium: Hang Jebat Stadium; Referee: Mohd Nafeez Abd Wahab

31 July 2021 16	Kuala Lumpur City	1–1	Melaka United	Cheras
21:00 UTC+8	Zhafri 53'; Irfan (yellow card) 62'; Partiban (yellow card) 90+6'	Report	Robbat (yellow card) 34'; Akmal (yellow card) 41'; Jang (yellow card) 45+2', (goal) 90+8'	Stadium: Kuala Lumpur Stadium; Referee: Mohd Hasrol Mohd Amir

3 August 2021 17	Melaka United	0–1	Johor Darul Ta'zim	Krubong
21:00 UTC+8	Razman (yellow card) 70'	Report	Bergson 2' (pen.); Afiq (yellow card) 51'; Arif (yellow card) 84'; Davies (yellow card) 90'; Sumareh (yellow card) 90+2'	Stadium: Hang Jebat Stadium; Referee: Hamdan Awang

7 August 2021 18	Penang	2–1	Melaka United	Penang
21:00 UTC+8	Khairu (yellow card) 21' (yellow-red card) 66'; Utomo (yellow card) 60'; Rafael 75'	Report	Afiq (yellow card) 31'; Faris (yellow card) 45+2'; Jang (yellow card) 73'; Giovane 90'	Stadium: City Stadium; Referee: Noor Azriel Baharudin

22 August 2021 19	Melaka United	1–1	UiTM	Krubong
21:00 UTC+8	Kumaahran 45'	Report	Nirennold 53'	Stadium: Hang Jebat Stadium; Referee: Muhammad Khairulsyahmi Ahmad Khalidi

28 August 2021 20	Selangor	1–1	Melaka United	Petaling Jaya
21:00 UTC+8	Heing 18'; Ashmawi (red card) 28'	Report	Akmal (yellow card) 45+2'; Fakhrullah (yellow card) 82'; Ott 90+4'	Stadium: Petaling Jaya Stadium; Referee: Mohd Amirul Izwan Yaacob

3 September 2021 21	Melaka United	2–1	Perak	Krubong
21:00 UTC+8	Khairul (yellow card) 27'; Ott 67'; Norde 79'; Faizal (yellow card) 88'; Fahmi (yellow card) 90+3'	Report	Agüero 30' (pen.), (yellow card) 73'; Nazmi (yellow card) 62'; Noureddine (yellow card) 69'; Aizat (yellow card) 90+2'	Stadium: Hang Jebat Stadium; Referee: Ahmad Zuhaidi Dzulkifli

August 2021 22	Kedah Darul Aman	4–1	Melaka United	Alor Setar
21:00 UTC+8	Tchétché 24', 30'; Renan (yellow card) 43'; Baddrol 66'; Fayadh 69'	Report	Khairul (yellow card) 39'; Adriano 59'; Akmal (yellow card) 80'	Stadium: Darul Aman Stadium; Referee: Zulkarnain Zakaria

==== League table ====
Pos	Team	Pld	W	D	L	GF	GA	GD	Pts	Qualification or relegation
6	Kuala Lumpur City	22	8	9	5	27	20	+7	33 (Note: KL City qualified to 2022 AFC Cup as winner of 2021 Malaysia Cup)	Qualification for AFC Cup group stage
7	Petaling Jaya City	22	6	6	10	16	28	−12	24	
8	Melaka United	22	5	9	8	25	31	−6	21 (Note: Melaka have been docked three points based on the following of the decision from FAM (Football Association of Malaysia).)	
9	Sabah	22	4	7	11	21	38	−17	19	
10	Sri Pahang	22	4	6	12	23	37	−14	18	

Source: Malaysian Football League
Rules for classification: 1) Points; 2) Goal difference; 3) Number of goals scored.

=== Malaysia Cup ===
==== Group stage ====
The draw for the group stage was held on 15 September 2021.

Pos	Team	Pld	W	D	L	GF	GA	GD	Pts	Qualification	MEL	KED	KLU	NSE
1	Melaka United	6	5	1	0	15	5	+10	16	Quarter-finals	—	2–0	2–1	2–0
2	Kedah Darul Aman	6	4	0	2	13	6	+7	12	Quarter-finals	1–3	—	3–0	3–0 (Note: Negeri Sembilan withdrew from the tournament on 22 October 2021, after 20 players and 4 staff members tested positive for COVID-19; this prompted them to withdraw for the safety of all parties and were advised by the team's medical doctor. As according to MFL's rule book, all of Negeri Sembilan's remaining matches were awarded a 3–0 win to the opposing team.)
3	Kelantan United	6	1	1	4	8	12	−4	4		3–3	1–3	—	0–1
4	Negeri Sembilan	6	1	0	5	1	14	−13	3	Withdrew	0–3	0–3	0–3	—

Source: MFL, FAM
Notes:

27 September 2021 1	Melaka United	2–0	Negeri Sembilan	Krubong
21:00 UTC +8	Adriano 28'; Khairul (yellow card) 54'; Kumaahran 65'	Report	Arthur Cunha (yellow card) 22'; Koné (yellow card) 47'; Akono (yellow card) 72'	Stadium: Hang Jebat Stadium; Referee: Suhaimi Mat Hassan

30 September 2021 2	Kedah Darul Aman	1–3	Melaka United	Alor Setar
21:00 UTC +8	Sherman 7'; Rizal (yellow card) 55'; Amirul (yellow card) 90+4'	Report	Norde 23'; Ott 39', 52'; Jang (yellow card) 80'; Afiq (yellow card) 90'	Stadium: Darul Aman Stadium; Attendance: 0 Referee: Mohd Fairuzi Mat Desa

29 October 2021 3	Melaka United	2–1	Kelantan United	Krubong
21:00 UTC +8	Norde 25'; Adriano 54'	Report	Fukai 43'; Hariz (yellow card) 60'; Imran (yellow card) 63'	Stadium: Hang Jebat Stadium; Attendance: 796; Referee: S. Logeswaran

1 November 2021 4	Kelantan United	3–3	Melaka United	Kota Bharu
21:00 UTC +8	Tanigawa 22'; Evan (yellow card) 27'; Gassama 39'; Imran (yellow card) 68'; Shafizi 78'	Report	Norde 25'; Kumaahran 55'; Ott 84'	Stadium: Sultan Muhammad IV Stadium; Attendance: 41; Referee: Abdul Rahman Wahab

6 November 2021 5	Negeri Sembilan	0–3	Melaka United
21:00 UTC +8

9 November 2021 6	Melaka United	2–0	Kedah Darul Aman	Krubong
21:00 UTC +8	Ott 24', (yellow card) 78'; Norde (yellow card) 40'; Hasbullah (yellow card) 65'; Gomes 89'; Adriano (yellow card) 90+1'	Report	Renan (yellow card) 12'; Rodney (yellow card) 45+1'; Fadzrul (yellow card) 90+1'	Stadium: Hang Jebat Stadium; Attendance: 1,399; Referee: Hamdan Awang

==== Knockout stage ====
===== Quarter-finals =====
14 November 2021 First leg	Sabah	0–1	Melaka United	Kota Kinabalu
20:15 UTC +8	Rawilson (yellow card) 17'	Report	Jang (yellow card) 16'; Norde 52'; Adriano (yellow card) 90'	Stadium: Likas Stadium; Attendance: 7,213; Referee: Ahmad Zuhaidi Dzulkifli

18 November 2021 Second leg	Melaka United	2–1	Sabah	Krubong
21:00 UTC +8	Adriano 3'; Norde 78'		Mitrevski 90+3' (pen.)	Stadium: Hang Jebat Stadium; Attendance: 6,328; Referee: Fairuzi Mat Desa

===== Semi-finals =====
22 November 2021 First leg	Kuala Lumpur City	1–1	Melaka United	Cheras
21:00 UTC +8	Kenny (yellow card) 25'; Zhafri 50'	Report	Adriano 8'; Ott (yellow card) 35'; Gomes (yellow card) 44'	Stadium: Kuala Lumpur Stadium; Referee: Mohammad Hasrol Mohd Amir

26 November 2021 Second leg	Melaka United	1–1 (a.e.t.) (3–5 p)	Kuala Lumpur City	Krubong
21:00 UTC +8	Syamim 66'		Partiban 9'	Stadium: Hang Jebat Stadium; Attendance: 17,500; Referee: Mohd Fusser Mad Sallih
	Penalties
	Gomes (penalty missed); Ott (penalty scored); Adriano (penalty scored); Norde (penalty scored)		Hadin (penalty scored); Gallifuoco (penalty scored); Paulo Josué (penalty scored); Morales (penalty scored); Indra Putra (penalty scored)

== Statistics ==
=== Appearances and goals ===
Players with no appearances not included in the list.

As of match played 26 November 2021

No.	Pos.	Name	League		Malaysia Cup		Total	
No.	Pos.	Name	Apps	Goals	Apps	Goals	Apps	Goals
2	DF	(Malaysia) Che Rashid	3(7)	0	0(2)	0	12	0
3	DF	(Malaysia) Akmal Zahir	11(4)	0	8	0	23	0
6	DF	(South Korea) Jang Suk-won	19	1	9	0	28	1
7	MF	(Malaysia) Wan Zaharulnizam	10(4)	2	2(3)	0	19	2
8	MF	(Philippines) (Germany) Manny Ott	22	2	9	4	31	6
9	FW	(Brazil) Giovane Gomes	8	1	6(3)	1	17	2
10	MF	(Haiti) Sony Norde	21	3	9	5	30	8
11	DF	(Malaysia) Syamim Yahya	12	1	3(4)	1	19	2
12	FW	(Malaysia) S. Kumaahran	15	4	8	2	23	6
13	DF	(Malaysia) Razman Roslan	9(6)	0	1(6)	0	22	0
14	MF	(Malaysia) Fakhrullah Rosli	1(15)	1	0(6)	0	22	1
15	DF	(Malaysia) Khairul Anwar	12(1)	0	9	0	22	0
17	MF	(Malaysia) Hazim Abu Zaid	0(6)	0	0	0	6	0
18	DF	(Malaysia) Wan Amirul Afiq	20	0	2(4)	0	26	0
19	GK	(Malaysia) Khairul Fahmi	18	0	9	0	27	0
20	FW	(Malaysia) Faizal Talib	3(1)	0	0(2)	0	6	0
21	MF	(Malaysia) Gary Steven Robbat	3	0	0	0	3	0
22	GK	(Malaysia) Norazlan Razali	4	0	0	0	4	0
23	MF	(Malaysia) Jasmir Mehat	1(6)	0	0	0	7	0
24	DF	(Malaysia) Farid Azmi	0(1)	0	0	0	1	0
25	MF	(Malaysia) Faris Shah	15(4)	1	7	0	26	1
27	FW	(Brazil) Adriano	9	2	8(1)	4	18	6
28	DF	(Malaysia) Amirul Hamer	0(1)	0	0	0	1	0
31	DF	(Malaysia) Khairul Helmi	4(4)	0	0(1)	0	9	0
35	DF	(Malaysia) Hasbullah Abu Bakar	7(5)	0	9	0	21	0
Players who have played this season but had left the club or on loan to other club
9	FW	(Brazil) Alex	9(1)	3	0	0	10	3
90	FW	(Montenegro) Stefan Nikolić	6(1)	4	0	0	7	4
