= 2022 Melaka United F.C. season =

Melaka United
2022 season
- President: Justin Lim
- Head coach: Risto Vidaković (until 13 April); Asri Ninggal (since 15 April)
- Stadium: Hang Jebat Stadium (capacity:40,000)
- Malaysia Super League: 10th
- FA Cup: Quarter-finals
- Top goalscorer: League: Ifedayo Olusegun (7); All: Ifedayo Olusegun (7)
Home colours	Away colours	Third colours

The 2022 season was Melaka United Football Club's 98th season in club history and 6th season in the Malaysia Super League.

== Players ==
=== First-team squad ===
As of 28 December 2022

Note: Flags indicate national team as defined under FIFA eligibility rules; some limited exceptions apply. Players may hold more than one non-FIFA nationality.

No.	Pos.	Nation	Player
1	GK	MAS	Bryan See
2	DF	MAS	Haziq Puad
5	DF	MAS	Fauzan Fauzi
6	DF	PHI	Justin Baas
8	MF	MAS	Wan Zaharulnizam
9	FW	MAS	Norshahrul Idlan
10	MF	HAI	Sony Nordé
11	FW	GHA	Emmanuel Oti
12	FW	NGA	Ifedayo Olusegun
13	MF	MAS	Hamran Peter (on loan from Penang)
14	MF	MAS	Fakhrullah Rosli
15	MF	MAS	Khairul Anwar
16	MF	MAS	Fadhil Idris
18	DF	MAS	Wan Amirul Afiq
19	MF	MAS	Syahrul Azwari

No.	Pos.	Nation	Player
21	FW	MAS	Harith Naem
22	GK	MAS	Norazlan Razali
23	MF	MAS	Syazwan Andik (on loan from Johor Darul Ta'zim II)
24	MF	MAS	Syukri Baharun
25	MF	MAS	Faris Shah
27	FW	BRA	Adriano
30	GK	MAS	Asyraaf Omar
31	DF	MAS	Iman Hakimi
32	FW	MAS	Syahmi Shamsudin
33	MF	MAS	Norazizi Khalid
34	DF	MAS	Zarif Syamil
35	DF	MAS	Hasbullah Abu Bakar (on loan from Johor Darul Ta'zim)
36	FW	MAS	Zaim Hakim
51	GK	MAS	Asyraf Danial
72	DF	MAS	Fadhli Shas (on loan from Johor Darul Ta'zim II)

== Squad statistics ==
=== Appearances ===
As of 1 February 2023

No.	Pos	Player	League		FA Cup		Total	
No.	Pos	Player	Apps	Goals	Apps	Goals	Apps	Goals
1	GK	(Malaysia) Bryan See	11	0	1	0	12	0
2	DF	(Malaysia) Haziq Puad	15+1	0	1	0	17	0
3	DF	(Malaysia) Akmal Zahir	4	0	1	0	5	0
5	MF	(Malaysia) Fauzan Fauzi	6+6	0	0+1	0	13	0
6	DF	(Philippines) Justin Baas	14	2	1	0	15	2
8	MF	(Malaysia) Wan Zaharulnizam	11+6	2	0+2	0	19	2
9	FW	(Malaysia) Norshahrul Idlan	5+7	0	0+2	0	14	0
10	FW	(Haiti) Sony Nordé	14	2	2	2	16	4
12	FW	(Nigeria) Ifedayo Olusegun	15	7	2	0	17	7
14	MF	(Malaysia) Fakhrullah Rosli	5+3	0	0	0	8	0
15	DF	(Malaysia) Khairul Anwar Shahrudin	5+2	0	1	0	8	0
16	DF	(Malaysia) Fadhil Idris	17+1	0	2	0	20	0
17	FW	(Malaysia) Hazim Abu Zaid	1+1	0	0	0	2	0
18	DF	(Malaysia) Wan Amirul Afiq	18+1	0	2	0	21	0
19	MF	(Malaysia) Syahrul Azwari	5+9	0	0	0	14	0
20	MF	(Malaysia) Faizal Talib	3+1	0	0	0	4	0
21	MF	(Malaysia) Harith Naem	1+7	0	0	0	8	0
22	GK	(Malaysia) Norazlan Razali	7+1	0	1	0	9	0
23	DF	(Malaysia) Syazwan Andik	14+3	1	1	0	18	1
24	MF	(Malaysia) Syukri Baharun	7+8	0	1	0	16	0
25	DF	(Malaysia) Faris Shah Rosli	8+12	1	0+2	0	22	1
27	FW	(Brazil) Adriano	10	2	2	1	12	3
29	FW	(Ghana) Emmanuel Oti	9	4	2	0	11	4
30	GK	(Malaysia) Asyraaf Omar	4	0	0	0	4	0
31	DF	(Malaysia) Iman Hakimi	2+2	0	0	0	4	0
32	FW	(Malaysia) Syahmi Samsudin	2+5	1	0	0	7	1
33	MF	(Malaysia) Norazizi Khalid	0+2	0	0	0	2	0
35	MF	(Malaysia) Hasbullah Abu Bakar	14+6	1	1+1	0	22	1
36	FW	(Malaysia) Zaim Hakim	0+2	0	0	0	2	0
72	DF	(Malaysia) Fadhli Shas	15+1	0	1	0	17	0
Players who left the club during the season

== Competitions ==
=== Malaysia Super League ===
5 March 2022 1	Petaling Jaya City	1-0	Melaka United	Petaling Jaya
21:00 MYT (UTC+08:00)	Kumaahran Sathasivam 43'; Darren Lok (yellow card) 83'; Kalamullah Al-Hafiz (yellow card) 88'; Kogileswaran Raj (yellow card) 90+5'	Report	Fadhli Shas (yellow card) 47'	Stadium: MBPJ Stadium; Attendance: 352; Referee: Zuhaidi Dzulkilfi

8 March 2022 2	Penang	1-1	Melaka United	Georgetown
21:00 MYT (UTC+08:00)	Danial Ashraf 27'; Khairul Akmal (yellow card) 39'; Rafiuddin Roddin (yellow card) 63'	Report	Wan Amirul Afiq (yellow card) 34'; Latiff Suhaimi 41' (o.g.)	Stadium: City Stadium; Attendance: 1, 409; Referee: Hasrol Amir

5 April 2022 3	Melaka United	0-1	Sabah	Malacca
22:00 MYT (UTC+08:00)	Fakhrullah Rosli (yellow card) 57'	Report	Park Tae-soo 25'; Tommy Mawat (yellow card) 62'; Ummareng Bacok (yellow card) 90+2'	Stadium: Hang Jebat Stadium; Attendance: 1, 279; Referee: S. Logeswaran

9 April 2022 4	Kuala Lumpur City	2-0	Melaka United	Cheras
22:00 MYT (UTC+08:00)	Paulo Josué 3' (29)	Report	Justin Baas (yellow card) 60'; Akmal Zahir (yellow card) 80'	Stadium: Kuala Lumpur Stadium; Attendance: 464; Referee: Khirulazuan Kidam

16 April 2022 5	Sri Pahang	1-2	Melaka United	Kuantan
22:00 MYT (UTC+08:00)	Mahmoud Za’tara 4'; Azwan Aripin (yellow card) 22' (red card) 63'; Azam Azih (yellow card) 35'	Report	Fadhil Idris (yellow card) 13'; Emmanuel Oti 51'; Fadhli Shas (yellow card) 69'; Hasbullah Abu Bakar 70'	Stadium: Darul Makmur Stadium; Attendance: 1, 727; Referee: Razlan Joffri Ali

6 May 2022 7	Kedah Darul Aman	2-3	Melaka United	Alor Setar
21:00 MYT (UTC+08:00)	Ronald Ngah 20'; Syafiq Ahmad 37'; Jang Suk-won (yellow card) 41'; Azamuddin Akil (yellow card) 43'; Amirul Azhan (yellow card) 77'	Report	Wan Zaharulnizam (yellow card) 2'; Akmal Zahir (yellow card) 13'; Ifedayo Olusegun 23', 90+2'; Emmanuel Oti (yellow card) 78'; Fadhli Shas (yellow card) 86'	Stadium: Darul Aman Stadium; Attendance: 6, 418; Referee: S. Logeswaran

18 June 2022 10	Melaka United	0-0	Negeri Sembilan	Malacca
20:15 MYT (UTC+08:00)	Justin Baas (yellow card) 45+2'	Report	Saiful Ridzuwan (yellow card) 72'; Yashir Islame (yellow card) 75'	Stadium: Hang Jebat Stadium; Attendance: 4, 105; Referee: Tuan Mohd Yaasin bin Tuan Mohd Hanafiah

25 June 2022 11	Melaka United	2-3	Sarawak United	Malacca
21:00 MYT (UTC+08:00)	Sony Nordé 18'; Syazwan Andik 34'; Adriano Narcizo (yellow card) 53'	Report	Gonzalo Soto 23'; Lee Chang-hoon 61'; Raja Imran Shah (yellow card) 67'; Francis Koné 90+3'	Stadium: Hang Jebat Stadium; Attendance: 1, 673; Referee: Khairulsyahmi Khalidi

2 July 2022 6	Melaka United	1-1	Johor Darul Ta’zim	Malacca
21:00 MYT (UTC+08:00)	Justin Baas 39'; Sony Nordé (yellow card) 45'; Bryan See (yellow card) 54'; Wan Amirul Afiq (yellow card) 86'	Report	Leandro Velázquez (yellow card) 14' (goal) 27'; Jordi Amat (yellow card) 90+3'	Stadium: Hang Jebat Stadium; Attendance: 14, 562; Referee: S. Logeswaran

5 July 2022 8	Melaka United	2-0	Selangor	Malacca
20:15 MYT (UTC+08:00)	Fadhil Idris (yellow card) 22'; Ifedayo Olusegun 39', 57'; Wan Amirul Afiq (yellow card) 41'	Report	Fazly Mazlan (yellow card) 1'; Richmond Ankrah (yellow card) 56'	Stadium: Hang Jebat Stadium; Attendance: 2, 742; Referee: Nazmi Nasaruddin

20 July 2022 12	Melaka United	2-2	Petaling Jaya City	Malacca
21:00 MYT (UTC+08:00)	Emmanuel Oti 36'; Fadhli Shas (yellow card) 47'; Sony Nordé (yellow card) 70' (goal) 76'	Report	Darren Lok 43'; Gurusamy Kandasamy 64'; Kogileswaran Raj (yellow card) 70'	Stadium: Hang Jebat Stadium; Attendance: 987; Referee: Tuan Mohd Yaasin bin Tuan Mohd Hanafiah

26 July 2022 13	Melaka United	4-1	Penang	Malacca
21:00 MYT (UTC+08:00)	Emmanuel Oti 4'; Adriano Narcizo 36'; Fadhil Idris (yellow card) 52'; Ifedayo Olusegun 58'; Justin Baas 60'	Report	Khairul Akmal (yellow card) 17'; Rafael Vitor (yellow card) 74'; Adib Raop (yellow card) 83'; Lucas Silva 86'	Stadium: Hang Jebat Stadium; Attendance: 1, 573; Referee: Nafeez Wahab

31 July 2022 14	Sabah	2-1	Melaka United	Kota Kinabalu
19:30 MYT (UTC+08:00)	Park Tae-soo (yellow card) 58'; Amri Yahyah 65', 90+2'; Rawilson Batuil (red card) 90+5'	Report	Syazwan Andik (yellow card) 6'; Ifedayo Olusegun 24'; Adriano Narcizo (yellow card) 37'; Emmanuel Oti (yellow card) 45+3'; Haziq Puad (red card) 90+4'	Stadium: Likas Stadium; Attendance: 10, 192; Referee: Nazmi Nasaruddin

13 August 2022 16	Melaka United	2-2	Sri Pahang	Malacca
21:00 MYT (UTC+08:00)	Ifedayo Olusegun 38'; Adriano Narcizo 51'	Report	David Rowley 87'; Sharul Nizam 90'	Stadium: Hang Jebat Stadium; Attendance: 3, 186; Referee: Nazmi Nasaruddin

29 August 2022 17	Johor Darul Ta’zim	4-0	Melaka United	Iskandar Puteri
20:15 MYT (UTC+08:00)	Fernando Forestieri 13'; Bergson da Silva 33', 42', 85'; Leandro Velázquez (yellow card) 38'; Daniel Amier (yellow card) 45'; Shane Lowry (yellow card) 81'	Report		Stadium: Sultan Ibrahim Stadium; Attendance: 10, 962; Referee: Suhaizi Shukri

3 September 2022 9	Terengganu	5-0	Melaka United	Gong Badak
21:00 MYT (UTC+08:00)	Kpah Sherman 16'; Manuel Ott (yellow card) 26'; Nik Sharif Haseefy 62'; Kipré Tchétché 67', 75', 81'	Report		Stadium: Sultan Mizan Zainal Abidin Stadium; Attendance: 6, 950; Referee: Nafeez Wahab

9 September 2022 18	Melaka United	0-3	Kedah Darul Aman	Malacca
20:15 MYT (UTC+08:00)		Report	Mahmoud Al-Mardi 13', 89' (yellow card) 41'; Khairu Azrin (yellow card) 25'; Fayadh Zulkifli 83'	Stadium: Hang Jebat Stadium; Attendance: 1, 445; Referee: Mohd Fusser bin Mad Sallih

{{

Pos	Team	Pld	W	D	L	GF	GA	GD	Pts	Qualification or relegation
8	Kedah Darul Aman	22	8	3	11	32	41	−9	27	
9	Petaling Jaya City (D, R)	22	6	8	8	22	30	−8	26	Withdrawn from Liga Super and dissolved. (Note: Petaling Jaya City withdrew from Liga Super before the start of 2023 season.)
10	Melaka United (D, R)	22	4	6	12	22	43	−21	18 (Note: MFL officially snubs Melaka United and Sarawak United club licensing approval, as both clubs have problem with overdue payments of staffs or players. This decision prevented both from playing in 2023 Malaysian Super League. As of November 2nd, there are still no appeal from both clubs to continue the league structure by playing in M5 League.)	Ejected from Malaysian Super League and dissolved.
11	Sarawak United (D, R)	22	5	2	15	19	50	−31	17	Ejected from Malaysian Super League and relegated to 2023 Malaysia M3 League
12	Penang	22	2	5	15	22	45	−23	11	

Updated to match(es) played on unknown. Source: MFL
Rules for classification: 1) Points; 2) Goal difference; 3) Number of goals scored.
(D) Disqualified; (R) Relegated
