= 2017 Pahang FA season =

Pahang
2017 season
- President: Tengku Abdul Rahman Ibni Sultan Ahmad Shah
- Manager: Dato' Che Nasir Salleh
- Head Coach: Dollah Salleh
- Stadium: Darul Makmur Stadium
- Liga Super: 2nd
- Piala FA: Runners-up
- Piala Malaysia: Quarter-finals
- Top goalscorer: League: Matheus Alves (18); All: Matheus Alves (24)
- Highest home attendance: 30,149 vs Negeri Sembilan (30 April 2017)
- Lowest home attendance: 944 vs Sarawak (20 September 2017)
- Average home league attendance: 7,542
Home colours	Away colours

The 2017 season was Pahang's 14th season in the Liga Super Malaysia since its inception in 2004. Pahang also participated in the Piala FA and Piala Malaysia. The season covers the period from 21 January 2017 to 28 October 2017.

Pahang lost the Piala FA Final to Kedah after a 2–3 loss on 20 May.

== Players ==
=== First team squad ===
As of 1 September 2017

No.	Name	Nationality	Position	Date of birth (age)
Goalkeepers
1	Helmi Eliza	(Malaysia)	GK	20 January 1983 (age 43)
22	Saufi Muhammad	(Malaysia)	GK	11 July 1992 (age 34)
27	Wan Azraie	(Malaysia)	GK	7 July 1986 (age 40)
Defenders
2	Matthew Davies (Captain)	(Malaysia) (Australia)	RB / RWB	7 February 1995 (age 31)
3	Saiful Nizam	(Malaysia)	CB / LB / RB	3 March 1981 (age 45)
4	R. Dinesh	(Malaysia)	LB / LWB	13 February 1998 (age 28)
14	Faisal Rosli	(Malaysia)	LB / LWB / LW / ST	21 January 1991 (age 35)
15	Heo Jae-won	(South Korea)	CB / DM / CM	1 July 1984 (age 42)
18	Nordin Alias	(Malaysia)	DM / CB / RB / CM	26 October 1985 (age 41)
19	Afif Amiruddin	(Malaysia)	CB / RB	22 March 1984 (age 42)
21	Zubir Azmi	(Malaysia)	LB / LWB	14 November 1991 (age 34)
24	Muslim Ahmad	(Malaysia)	CB	25 April 1989 (age 37)
30	Ashar Al Aafiz	(Malaysia)	CB / RB	28 March 1995 (age 31)
Midfielders
6	Christie Jayaseelan	(Malaysia)	RW / LW	18 August 1986 (age 40)
7	Faisal Abdul Halim	(Malaysia)	ST / RW / LW	7 January 1998 (age 28)
8	Wan Zaharulnizam Zakaria	(Malaysia)	RW / LW	8 May 1991 (age 35)
9	Kiko Insa	(Malaysia) (Spain)	DM	25 January 1988 (age 38)
11	Syamim Yahya	(Malaysia)	RW / LW	17 May 1990 (age 36)
16	Nurridzuan Abu Hassan	(Malaysia)	AM / RM	20 April 1992 (age 34)
17	Joseph Kalang Tie	(Malaysia)	AM / LW	9 March 1987 (age 39)
20	Azam Azih	(Malaysia)	AM	3 March 1995 (age 31)
23	Salomon Raj	(Malaysia)	DM / CM	23 March 1994 (age 32)
Forwards
5	Ashari Samsudin	(Malaysia)	ST / RW / AM	7 June 1985 (age 41)
10	Yamil Romero	(Argentina)	ST / AM	11 July 1995 (age 31)
26	Mohamadou Sumareh	(The Gambia)	RW / AM	20 September 1991 (age 35)
28	Kogileswaran Raj	(Malaysia)	ST / LW / RW / AM	21 September 1998 (age 28)
29	Matheus Alves	(Brazil)	ST / AM	19 May 1993 (age 33)
–	**Bright Dike**	(Nigeria)	ST	2 February 1987 (age 39)

* Player names in bold denotes player that left during mid-season

== Technical staff ==
Position	Name
Team Manager	(Malaysia) Dato' Che Nasir B Salleh
Assistant Team Manager	(Malaysia) Jalaluddin Jaafar
Head Coach	(Malaysia) Dollah Salleh
Assistant Head Coach	(Malaysia) Ahmad Shaharuddin Rosdi
Coach	(Malaysia) Azaruddin Aziz
Coach	(Malaysia) Jalaluddin Jaafar
Goalkeeper Coach	(Malaysia) Muadzar Mohamad
Fitness Coach	(Malaysia) Mohd Hafiz Tajudin
Fitness Coach	(Malaysia) Abdul Rahim Kadir Ku Jambu
Physiotheraphy	(Malaysia) Adam Zuhairy Zafri
Kit Man	(Malaysia) Abdul Razak B Akil

== Transfers ==
First transfer window started in December 2017 to 22 January 2017 and second transfer window started on 15 May 2017 to 11 June 2017.

=== In ===
==== December to January ====
Date	Pos	Player	Transferred from
November 2016	DF	(Malaysia) Muslim Ahmad	(Malaysia) Kelantan
November 2016	MF	(Malaysia) Wan Zaharulnizam Zakaria	(Malaysia) Kelantan
November 2016	MF	(Malaysia) Syamim Yahya	(Malaysia) Felda United
November 2016	MF	(Malaysia) D. Christie Jayaseelan	(Malaysia) Felda United
November 2016	MF	(Malaysia) Nurridzuan Abu Hassan	(Malaysia) Perak
November 2016	MF	(Malaysia) Joseph Kalang Tie	(Malaysia) Terengganu
November 2016	MF	(Malaysia) Nordin Alias	(Malaysia) Terengganu
November 2016	DF	(Malaysia) Zubir Azmi	(Malaysia) Terengganu
November 2016	FW	(Malaysia) Ashari Samsudin	(Malaysia) Terengganu
November 2016	GK	(Malaysia) Wan Azraie Wan Teh	(Malaysia) T-Team
November 2016	DF	(Malaysia) Afif Amiruddin	(Malaysia) Perlis
November 2016	MF	(The Gambia) Mohamadou Sumareh	(Malaysia) Perlis
January 2017	DF	(Spain) (Malaysia) Kiko Insa	(Indonesia) Bali United
January 2017	DF	(South Korea) Heo Jae-won	(United Arab Emirates) Dibba Al-Fujairah
January 2017	FW	(Brazil) Matheus Alves	(Brazil) Fluminense
January 2017	FW	(United States) (Nigeria) Bright Dike	(Russia) Amkar Perm

==== May to June ====
Date	Pos	Player	Transferred from
17 May 2017	MF	(Argentina) Yamil Romero	(Argentina) Boca Juniors II

=== Out ===
==== December to January ====
Date	Pos	Player	Transferred to
November 2016	MF	(Malaysia) Fauzi Roslan	(Malaysia) Melaka United
November 2016	FW	(Malaysia) Amirul Kasmuri	(Malaysia) Shahzan Muda
November 2016	FW	(Malaysia) Faizal Abdul Rani	(Malaysia) Shahzan Muda
November 2016	FW	(Malaysia) Shafie Zahari	(Malaysia) Shahzan Muda
November 2016	MF	(Malaysia) Helmi Abdullah	(Malaysia) Shahzan Muda
November 2016	MF	(Malaysia) Shah Amirul Zamri	(Malaysia) Pahang U21
November 2016	GK	(Malaysia) Daniel Wafiuddin Sa'dun	(Malaysia) Pahang U21
November 2016	MF	(Malaysia) Rizua Shafiqi Kamaruzaman	(Malaysia) Shahzan Muda
November 2016	DF	(Malaysia) Ridhwan Maidin	(Malaysia) Shahzan Muda
November 2016	DF	(Malaysia) Shahrizan Salleh	(Malaysia) Shahzan Muda
November 2016	GK	(Malaysia) Nasril Nourdin	(Malaysia) Perlis
November 2016	DF	(Brazil) Jailton	Unattached
November 2016	MF	(Chile) Claudio Meneses	Unattached
November 2016	FW	(Argentina) Pablo Vranjicán	Unattached
November 2016	MF	(Afghanistan) Faysal Shayesteh	(Indonesia) Arema Cronus
January 2017	MF	(Malaysia) D. Saarvindran	(Malaysia) Johor Darul Ta'zim II

==== May to June ====
Date	Pos	Player	Transferred to
15 May 2017	FW	(Nigeria) Bright Dike	Unattached

== Competitions ==
=== Overall ===
Competition	Started round	Current position / round	Final position / round	First match	Last match
Super League	Matchday 1	2nd / Matchday 22	2nd / Matchday 22	20 January 2017	28 October 2017
FA Cup	Round of 32	Finished	Runner-up	14 February 2017	20 May 2017
Malaysia Cup	Group stage	Quarterfinals	Quarterfinals	4 July 2017	24 September 2017

Updated to match played 28 September 2017
Source: Competitions

=== Overview ===
Competition	Record							
Competition	Pld	W	D	L	GF	GA	GD	Win %
Liga Super	22	12	4	6	44	26	+18	54.55
Piala FA	7	5	0	2	15	9	+6	71.43
Piala Malaysia	8	3	3	2	17	13	+4	37.50
Total	37	20	7	10	76	48	+28	54.05

Last updated: 28 October 2017
Source: Competitions

=== Liga Super ===
The league kick-off on 21 January and ends on 21 October 2017.

==== League table ====
Pos	Team	Pld	W	D	L	GF	GA	GD	Pts	Qualification or relegation
1	Johor Darul Ta'zim (C)	22	15	4	3	50	19	+31	49	Qualification to Champions League preliminary round 2 or AFC Cup group stage
2	Pahang (Note: Pahang withdraw from AFC competition.)	22	12	4	6	44	26	+18	40	
3	Felda United (Note: Felda United were relegated because they failed to renew their licence) (R)	22	11	6	5	40	26	+14	39	Relegation to Premier League
4	Kedah (Note: Kedah as 2017 Malaysia FA Cup winners not eligible for AFC competition spots as they failed granted AFC club license.)	22	9	8	5	45	33	+12	35	
5	Perak	22	9	7	6	30	31	−1	34	

Source: FAM, FMLLP
Rules for classification: 1) Points; 2) Goal difference; 3) Number of goals scored.
(C) Champions; (R) Relegated

==== Results summary ====
Overall								Home						Away					
Pld	W	D	L	GF	GA	GD	Pts	W	D	L	GF	GA	GD	W	D	L	GF	GA	GD
22	12	4	6	44	26	+18	40	6	3	2	27	11	+16	6	1	4	17	15	+2

Last updated: 28 October 2017.
Source: Liga Super fixtures and results

==== Results by round ====
Round	1	2	3	4	5	6	7	8	9	10	11	12	13	14	15	16	17	18	19	20	21	22
Ground	A	H	A	A	H	A	H	A	A	H	H	H	A	A	H	A	H	A	H	H	A	H
Result	D	W	W	L	W	W	W	L	W	D	D	L	W	L	L	W	W	L	W	W	W	D
Position	5	1	1	2	2	2	1	2	2	2	2	2	2	2	3	3	3	3	3	2	2	2

Updated to match(es) played on 28 October 2017. Source: Liga Super fixtures and results
A = Away; H = Home; W = Win; D = Draw; L = Loss

==== Fixtures and results ====
Win Draw Loss

===== First leg =====
21 January 2017 1	Perak	1–1	Pahang	Ipoh, Perak
21:00 UTC+08:00	Thiago Junior Aquino 68'	Report	56' Syamim Yahya	Stadium: Perak Stadium; Attendance: 19,720; Referee: Muhammad Nazmi Nasaruddin

27 January 2017 2	Pahang	5–0	(Terengganu) T-Team	Kuantan, Pahang
21:00 UTC+08:00	Mohamadou Sumareh 14'; Matheus Alves 55', 74'; Heo Jae-won 65'; Bright Dike 85'	Report		Stadium: Darul Makmur Stadium; Attendance: 13,402; Referee: Mohd Zohri Tajuddin

4 February 2017 3	Sarawak	0–1	Pahang	Kuching, Sarawak
21:00 UTC+08:00		Report	24' Bright Dike	Stadium: Sarawak State Stadium; Attendance: 8,011; Referee: S. Sittharanjanan

11 February 2017 4	Kedah	4–1	Pahang	Alor Setar, Kedah
21:00 UTC+08:00	Baddrol Bakhtiar 45+1'; Ken Ilsø 67', 90+2'; Muhammad Farhan Roslan 75'	Report	89' Matheus Alves	Stadium: Darul Aman Stadium; Attendance: 12,000; Referee: Muhd Nazmi Nasaruddin

18 February 2017 5	Pahang	6–1	(Penang) Pulau Pinang	Kuantan, Pahang
21:00 UTC+08:00	Mohamadou Sumareh 16'; Wan Zaharulnizam 25'; Joseph Kalang Tie 66'; Matheus Alves 73'; Ashari Samsudin 85', 86'	Report	31' Nigel Dabinyaba	Stadium: Darul Makmur Stadium; Attendance: 9,654; Referee: Zulkifli Ahmad

25 February 2017 6	Melaka United (Malacca)	1–3	Pahang	Krubong, Melaka
21:00 UTC+08:00	Khuzaimi Piee 90'	Report	21' Joseph Kalang Tie; 43' Matheus Alves; 57' Mohamadou Sumareh	Stadium: Hang Jebat Stadium; Attendance: 12,151; Referee: Muhammad Nazmi Nasaruddin

28 February 2017 7	Pahang	3–0	(Selangor) PKNS	Kuantan, Pahang
21:00 UTC+08:00	Mohd Afif Amiruddin 19'; Matheus Alves 58'; Ashari Samsudin 70'	Report		Stadium: Darul Makmur Stadium; Attendance: 10,826; Referee: Suhaizi Shukri

3 March 2017 8	Johor Darul Ta'zim	3–2	Pahang	Larkin, Johor
21:00 UTC+08:00	Ahmad Hazwan Bakri 30', 36'; Mohd Safiq Rahim 56'	Report	15', 68' Matheus Alves	Stadium: Tan Sri Dato' Haji Hassan Yunos Stadium; Attendance: 20,480; Referee: Zulkifli Ahmad

8 April 2017 9	Kelantan	1–2	Pahang	Kota Bharu, Kelantan
21:00 UTC+08:00	Mohammed Ghaddar 16'	Report	60' Wan Zaharulnizam; 62' Matheus Alves	Stadium: Sultan Muhammad IV Stadium; Attendance: 3,373; Referee: Mohd Nafeez Abd Wahab

15 April 2017 10	Pahang	2–2	Selangor	Kuantan, Pahang
21:00 UTC+08:00	Matthew Davies 11'; Faisal Rosli 88'	Report	6' Juliano Mineiro; 66' Francis Doe	Stadium: Darul Makmur Stadium; Attendance: 12,847; Referee: Fitri Maskon

26 April 2017 11	Pahang	1–1	(Kuala Lumpur) Felda United	Kuantan, Pahang
21:00 UTC+08:00	Matheus Alves 20'	Report	24' Stuart Wark	Stadium: Darul Makmur Stadium; Attendance: 5,646; Referee: Mohamad Nazmi Nasaruddin

===== Second leg =====
6 May 2017 12	Pahang	2–3	Kelantan	Kuantan, Pahang
21:00 UTC+08:00	Alves 70', 78'	Report	18' Alessandro Celin; 73', 79' Mohammed Ghaddar	Stadium: Darul Makmur Stadium; Attendance: 11,267; Referee: Nagor Amir Noor Mohamed

24 May 2017 13	Selangor	0–2	Pahang	Selayang, Selangor
21:00 UTC+08:00		Report	74', 83' Alves	Stadium: Selayang Stadium; Attendance: 9,756; Referee: Muhammad Nazmi Nasaruddin

1 July 2017 14	Felda United (Kuala Lumpur)	2–1	Pahang	Jengka, Pahang
21:00 UTC+08:00	Olusegun 5'; Thiago A. 88'	Report	1' Sumareh	Stadium: Tun Abdul Razak Stadium; Attendance: 18,500; Referee: Zamzaidi Katimin

11 July 2017 15	Pahang	0–2	Johor Darul Ta'zim	Kuantan, Pahang
21:00 UTC+08:00		Report	2' Cabrera; 86' N. Insa	Stadium: Darul Makmur Stadium; Attendance: 8,053; Referee: Razlan Jofri Ali

15 July 2017 16	PKNS (Selangor)	1–3	Pahang	Shah Alam, Selangor
21:00 UTC+08:00		Report	36' Sumareh; 63', 71' Alves	Stadium: Shah Alam Stadium; Attendance: 1,092; Referee: Khairul Azuan Kidam

22 July 2017 17	Pahang	2–0	(Malacca) Melaka United	Kuantan, Pahang
21:00 UTC+08:00	Romero 5'; Sumareh 53'	Report		Stadium: Darul Makmur Stadium; Attendance: 2,455; Referee: Razlan Joffri Ali

26 July 2017 18	Pulau Pinang (Penang)	2–0	Pahang	Batu Kawan, Pulau Pinang
21:00 UTC+08:00	Hartmann 8'; Sanna 65'	Report		Stadium: Penang State Stadium; Attendance: 2,158; Referee: Suresh Jayaraman

5 August 2017 19	Pahang	2–1	Kedah	Kuantan, Pahang
21:00 UTC+08:00	Yamil 65'; Alves 80'	Report	78' Syafiq Ahmad	Stadium: Darul Makmur Stadium; Attendance: 6,111; Referee: Nagor Amir Noor Mohamed

20 September 2017 20	Pahang	3–0	Sarawak	Kuantan, Pahang
21:00 UTC+08:00	Kogileswaran 23'; Christie 28', 42'	Report		Stadium: Darul Makmur Stadium; Attendance: 944; Referee: Muhammad Rahmat Jantan

27 September 2017 21	T-Team (Terengganu)	0–1	Pahang	Kuala Terengganu, Terengganu
20:15 UTC+08:00		Report	79' Matheus	Stadium: Sultan Ismail Nasiruddin Shah Stadium; Attendance: 300; Referee: Suresh Jayaraman

28 October 2017 22	Pahang	1–1	Perak	Kuantan, Pahang
21:00 UTC+08:00	Jayaseelan 24'	Report	Nasir 79'	Stadium: Darul Makmur Stadium; Attendance: 1,759; Referee: Nagor Amir Noor Mohamed

=== Piala FA ===
The tournament kick-off on 5 February and ends on 20 May 2017.

==== Results summary ====
Overall								Home						Away					
Pld	W	D	L	GF	GA	GD	Pts	W	D	L	GF	GA	GD	W	D	L	GF	GA	GD
7	5	0	2	15	9	+6	15	3	0	1	8	4	+4	2	0	1	7	5	+2

Last updated: 20 May 2017.
Source: Piala FA fixtures and results

==== Knockout phase ====
===== Round of 32 =====
14 February 2017 Round 2	Johor Darul Ta'zim II	2–4 (a.e.t.)	Pahang	Pasir Gudang, Johor
21:00 UTC+08:00	Hadi Fayyadh 35', 38'	Report	46', 68' Mohamadou Sumareh; 105' Matheus Alves; 110' Salomon Raj	Stadium: Pasir Gudang Corporation Stadium; Attendance: 1,688; Referee: Khairulazuan Kidam

===== Round of 16 =====
11 March 2017 Round 3	Pahang	2–0	(Malacca) Melaka United	Kuantan, Pahang
21:00 UTC+08:00	Heo Jae-won 16' (pen.); Muhd Nor Azam Abdul Azih 86'	Report		Stadium: Darul Makmur Stadium; Attendance: 20,298; Referee: Mohd Amirul Izwan Yaacob

===== Quarter-finals =====
1 April 2017 First leg	Pahang	3–1	Johor Darul Ta'zim	Kuantan, Pahang
21:00 UTC+08:00	Syamim Yahya 14'; Matheus Alves 49'; Bright Dike 67'	Report	22' Marcos António Elias Santos	Stadium: Darul Makmur Stadium; Attendance: 29,100; Referee: Suhaimi Mat Hassan

23 April 2017 Second leg	Johor Darul Ta'zim	2–1	Pahang	Larkin, Johor
21:00 UTC+08:00	Gonzalo Cabrera 6'; Gabriel Miguel Guerra 23'	Report	87' Mohamadou Sumareh	Stadium: Tan Sri Dato' Haji Hassan Yunos Stadium; Attendance: 23,420; Referee: Zulkifli Ahmad

===== Semi-finals =====
30 April 2017 First leg	Pahang	1–0	Negeri Sembilan	Kuantan, Pahang
21:00 UTC+08:00	Annas Rahmat 80' (o.g.)	Report		Stadium: Darul Makmur Stadium; Attendance: 30,149; Referee: Razlan Jofri Ali

13 May 2017 Second leg	Negeri Sembilan	1–2	Pahang	Paroi, Negeri Sembilan
21:00 UTC+08:00	Bruno Suzuki 68'	Report	6' Heo Jae-won; 90+2' D. Christie Jayaseelan	Stadium: Tuanku Abdul Rahman Stadium; Attendance: 38,380; Referee: Muhammad Nazmi Nasaruddin

===== Final =====
20 May 2017	Pahang	2–3	Kedah	Shah Alam Stadium, Shah Alam
21:00 (UTC+8)	Heo Jae-won 45+3'; Sumareh 80'	Report	20' Ken Ilsø; 45+1', 72' Baddrol	Attendance: 78,898; Referee: Nagor Amir Noor Mohamed

=== Piala Malaysia ===
==== Results summary ====
Overall								Home						Away					
Pld	W	D	L	GF	GA	GD	Pts	W	D	L	GF	GA	GD	W	D	L	GF	GA	GD
8	3	3	2	17	13	+4	12	3	1	0	14	5	+9	0	2	2	3	8	−5

Last updated: 24 September 2017.
Source: Piala Malaysia fixtures and results

==== Group stage ====
Pos	Team	Pld	W	D	L	GF	GA	GD	Pts	Qualification
1	(Perak) PKNP	6	3	2	1	9	9	0	11	Advance to knockout phase
2	Pahang	6	2	3	1	14	8	+6	9	Advance to knockout phase
3	Negeri Sembilan	6	1	3	2	8	12	−4	6	
4	(Terengganu) T–Team	6	1	2	3	12	14	−2	5	

Updated to match(es) played on 9 September 2017. Source: FAM FMLLP

Win Draw Loss

4 July 2017 GS1	Pahang	2–2	Negeri Sembilan	Kuantan, Pahang
21:00 UTC+08:00	Alves 59', 64'	Report	44' Béhé; 76' Tuck	Stadium: Darul Makmur Stadium; Attendance: 5,292; Referee: Wan Mohamad Tarmizi Wan Ibrahim

7 July 2017 GS2	PKNP (Perak)	1–1	Pahang	Ipoh, Perak
21:00 UTC+08:00	Afif 81' (o.g.)	Report	52' Alves	Stadium: Perak Stadium; Attendance: 3,372; Referee: Muhammad Rahmat Jantan

18 July 2017 GS3	T-Team (Terengganu)	1–1	Pahang	Kuala Terengganu, Terengganu
21:00 UTC+08:00	Hakim 6'	Report	1' Sumareh	Stadium: Sultan Ismail Nasiruddin Shah Stadium; Attendance: 1,349; Referee: Mohd Amirul Izwan Yaacob

29 July 2017 GS4	Negeri Sembilan	2–1	Pahang	Paroi, Negeri Sembilan
21:00 UTC+08:00	Farderin 11'; Khairul 36'	Report	88' Heo Jae-won	Stadium: Tunku Abdul Rahman Stadium; Attendance: 4,877; Referee: Wan Mohd Tarmizi Wan Ibrahim

1 August 2017 GS5	Pahang	6–0	(Perak) PKNP	Kuantan, Pahang
21:00 UTC+08:00	Wan Zaharulnizam 28', 52'; Joseph Kalang Tie 33', 42'; Afif 84'; Alves 87'	Report		Stadium: Darul Makmur Stadium; Attendance: 1,990; Referee: Razlan Jofri Ali

9 September 2017 GS6	Pahang	3–2	(Terengganu) T-Team	Kuantan, Pahang
21:00 UTC+08:00	Matheus 40'; Azam 53'; Yamil 85'	Report	52' Syed Sobri; 56' Abdoulaye	Stadium: Darul Makmur Stadium; Attendance: 6,878; Referee: Muhammad Rahmat Jantan

==== Knockout stage ====
16 September 2017 QF1	Pahang	3–1	Perak	Kuantan, Pahang
21:00 UTC+08:00	Wan Zaharulnizam 36'; Afif 38'; Matthew 41'	Report	69' Gilmar	Stadium: Darul Makmur Stadium; Attendance: 11,881; Referee: Razlan Jafri Ali

23 September 2017 QF2	Perak	4–0 (5–3 agg.)	Pahang	Ipoh, Perak
21:00 UTC+08:00	Gilmar 3', 63'; Kenny 77'; Nazrin 90+1'	Report		Stadium: Perak Stadium; Attendance: 9,015; Referee: Suhaimi Mat Hassan

== Statistics ==
=== Appearances ===
No.	Pos.	Name	Liga Super	Piala FA	Piala Malaysia	Total
1	GK	(Malaysia) Helmi Eliza	5 (1)	0	1	6 (1)
2	DF	(Malaysia) Matthew Davies	17 (1)	7	7	31 (1)
3	DF	(Malaysia) Saiful Nizam	4 (4)	0	3 (2)	7 (6)
4	DF	(Malaysia) R. Dinesh	2	0 (1)	0	2 (1)
5	FW	(Malaysia) Ashari Samsudin	9 (7)	1 (5)	3 (2)	13 (14)
6	MF	(Malaysia) Christie Jayaseelan	4 (5)	2 (2)	0 (6)	6 (13)
7	MF	(Malaysia) Faisal Abdul Halim	1 (4)	0	0 (2)	1 (6)
8	MF	(Malaysia) Wan Zaharulnizam Zakaria	14 (1)	7	6 (1)	27 (2)
9	MF	(Malaysia) Kiko Insa	7 (4)	3 (1)	1 (2)	11 (7)
10	FW	(Argentina) Yamil Romero	8	1	8	17
11	MF	(Malaysia) Syamim Yahya	16 (3)	7	3 (2)	26 (5)
14	MF	(Malaysia) Faisal Rosli	16	7	5	28
15	DF	(South Korea) Heo Jae-won	20	7	8	35
16	MF	(Malaysia) Nurridzuan Abu Hassan	1 (6)	1 (1)	1 (1)	3 (8)
17	MF	(Malaysia) Joseph Kalang Tie	6 (7)	1 (2)	1 (3)	8 (12)
18	MF	(Malaysia) Nordin Alias	0 (1)	0	0	0 (1)
19	DF	(Malaysia) Afif Amiruddin	17 (1)	4 (1)	6	27 (2)
20	MF	(Malaysia) Azam Azih	18 (2)	5 (2)	7	30 (4)
21	DF	(Malaysia) Zubir Azmi	6	0	3	9
22	GK	(Malaysia) Saufi Muhammad	0	0	0	0
23	MF	(Malaysia) Salomon Raj	2 (3)	0 (2)	0 (1)	2 (6)
24	DF	(Malaysia) Muslim Ahmad	5 (3)	3 (1)	1	9 (4)
26	MF	(The Gambia) Mohamadou Sumareh	21	6	8	35
27	GK	(Malaysia) Wan Azraie	17	7	7	31
28	FW	(Malaysia) Kogileswaran Raj	1 (3)	0	1 (2)	2 (5)
29	FW	(Brazil) Matheus Alves	21	7	8	36
30	DF	(Malaysia) Ashar Al Aafiz	0 (1)	0	1	1 (1)
Left club during season
–	FW	(Nigeria) Bright Dike	4 (4)	1 (1)	0	5 (5)

Last updated: 28 October 2017.
Source: Soccerway

=== Top scorers ===
Correct as of match played on 28 October 2017

The list is sorted by shirt number when total goals are equal.

Rnk	No.	Player	Pos	Liga Super	Piala FA	Piala Malaysia	Total
1	29	(Brazil) Matheus Alves	FW	18	2	5	24
2	26	(The Gambia) Mohamadou Sumareh	FW	6	4	1	11
3	8	(Malaysia) Wan Zaharulnizam	MF	2	0	3	5
3	15	(South Korea) Heo Jae-won	DF	1	3	1	5
5	17	(Malaysia) Joseph Kalang Tie	MF	2	0	2	4
5	6	(Malaysia) D. Christie Jayaseelan	MF	3	1	0	4
7	5	(Malaysia) Ashari Samsudin	FW	3	0	0	3
7	10	(Nigeria) **Bright Dike**	FW	2	1	0	3
7	10	(Argentina) Yamil Romero	FW	2	0	1	3
7	19	(Malaysia) Afif Amiruddin	DF	1	0	2	3
11	2	(Malaysia) Matthew Davies	DF	1	0	1	2
11	11	(Malaysia) Ahmad Syamim Yahya	MF	1	1	0	2
11	20	(Malaysia) Azam Azih	MF	0	1	1	2
14	14	(Malaysia) Faisal Rosli	DF	1	0	0	1
14	23	(Malaysia) Salamon Raj	MF	0	1	0	1
14	28	(Malaysia) Kogileswaran Raj	FW	1	0	0	1
Own Goal				0	1	0	1
Total				44	15	17	76

* Player names in bold denotes player that left during mid-season

Last updated: 28 October 2017.
Source: Soccerway

=== Clean sheets ===
Correct as of match played on 28 October 2017

The list is sorted by shirt number when total clean sheets are equal.

Rnk	No.	Player	Liga Super	Piala FA	Piala Malaysia	Total
1	27	(Malaysia) Wan Azraie	5	2	1	8
2	1	(Malaysia) Helmi Eliza	2	0	1	3
**Total**			**7**	**2**	**2**	**11**

=== Home attendance ===
==== Matches (all competitions) ====
All matches played at Darul Makmur Stadium.

Date	Attendance	Opposition	Score	Competition
27 January 2017	13,402	(Terengganu) T-Team	5–0	Liga Super matchday 2
18 February 2017	9,654	Penang	6–1	Liga Super matchday 5
28 February 2017	10,826	(Selangor) PKNS	3–0	Liga Super matchday 7
11 March 2017	20,298	(Malacca) Melaka United	2–0	Piala FA Round of 16
1 April 2017	29,100	Johor Darul Ta'zim	3–1	Piala FA Quarter-finals
15 April 2017	12,847	Selangor	2–2	Liga Super matchday 10
26 April 2017	5,646	(Kuala Lumpur) Felda United	1–1	Liga Super matchday 11
30 April 2017	**30,149**	Negeri Sembilan	1–0	Piala FA Semi-finals
6 May 2017	11,267	Kelantan	2–3	Liga Super matchday 12
4 July 2017	5,292	Negeri Sembilan	2–2	Piala Malaysia matchday 1
11 July 2017	8,053	Johor Darul Ta'zim	0–2	Liga Super matchday 15
22 July 2017	2,455	(Malacca) Melaka United	2–0	Liga Super matchday 17
1 August 2017	1,990	(Perak) PKNP	6–0	Piala Malaysia matchday 5
5 August 2017	6,111	Kedah	2–1	Liga Super matchday 19
9 September 2017	6,878	(Terengganu) T-Team	3–2	Piala Malaysia matchday 6
16 September 2017	11,881	Perak	3–1	Piala Malaysia Quarter-finals
20 September 2017	944	Sarawak	3–0	Liga Super matchday 20
28 October 2017	1,759	Perak	1–1	Liga Super matchday 22
