= 2024–25 Melaka F.C. season =

Melaka
2024–25 season
- Chairman: Muhammad Najmi Nordin
- Manager: K. Devan
- Stadium: Stadium Hang Jebat
- A1 Semi-Pro League: 1st
- FA Cup: DNQ
- Top goalscorer: League: Azim Rahim (6 goals); All: Azim Rahim (6 goals)
- Biggest win: 4–1 v PIB (Away); 1 June 2024 (A1 Semi-Pro League)
- Biggest defeat: NIL
| Home colours | Away colours |

The 2024–25 season was the 2nd season in the history of Melaka Football Club. Currently, Melaka only one competition this season, the A1 Semi-Pro League.

== Technical staff ==
| Position | Name |
|---|---|
| Team manager | (Malaysia) Muhammad Najmi Nordin |
| Assistant team manager | (Malaysia) Mohd Hafiz Karim |
| Technical director | (Malaysia) Sapian Abdul Wahid |
| Head coach | (Malaysia) K. Devan |
| Assistant coaches | (Malaysia) Musaffar Shah Dawood Shah (Malaysia) S. Subramaniam |
| Goalkeeping coach | (Malaysia) Zulkarnain Osman |
| Fitness coach | (Malaysia) Poobathy Detchanan |
| Physio | (Malaysia) Aiman Ab Rahman |
| Team coordinator | (Malaysia) Al Qayyum Farhan Azlan |
| Media officer | (Malaysia) Muhammad Irsyad Hairuddin |
| Kitman | (Malaysia) Ahmad Syukri Oth |

== Players ==
As of 29 May 2024

Note: Flags indicate national team as defined under FIFA eligibility rules; some limited exceptions apply. Players may hold more than one non-FIFA nationality.

| No. | Pos. | Nation | Player |
|---|---|---|---|
| 1 | GK | MAS | Shaheeswaran Thavakumar |
| 2 | DF | MAS | Muhammad Aidil Azuan |
| 4 | MF | MAS | Nasir Basharudin (captain) |
| 6 | DF | MAS | Muhammad Firdaus Ya'akub |
| 7 | MF | MAS | Faizal Talib |
| 8 | MF | MAS | Muhammad Syamierul Razmee |
| 9 | FW | MAS | Hadi Mohamad |
| 10 | FW | MAS | Zulkiffli Zakaria |
| 11 | FW | GHA | Fuseini Issah |
| 12 | FW | MAS | Azim Rahim |
| 13 | DF | MAS | Jeremy Lim Wei Shen |
| 14 | MF | MAS | Fakhrullah Rosli |
| 15 | MF | MAS | Royizzat Daud |
| 16 | MF | NGR | Michael Onyekachi Ozor |
| 17 | DF | MAS | Muhammad Zulkhairi Zulkeply |
| 18 | GK | MAS | Solehin Mamat |
| 19 | MF | MAS | Durrkeswaran Ganasan |

| No. | Pos. | Nation | Player |
|---|---|---|---|
| 20 | MF | MAS | Muhammad Luqmanul Hakeem |
| 21 | FW | NGR | Oumar Bangoura |
| 23 | FW | MAS | Muhammad Hakimy Mohd Khairol |
| 25 | DF | MAS | Khairul Anwar Shahrudin |
| 27 | DF | MAS | Muhammad Hafiz Mohd Johar |
| 29 | GK | MAS | Ameerul Eqhwan Mohd Fauzi |
| 30 | DF | MAS | Haziq Puad |
| 39 | DF | MAS | Thaanush Sithiravelu |
| 47 | DF | MAS | Farid Nezal |
| 69 | MF | MAS | Muhammad Fikri Mohamed Shah |
| 74 | DF | MAS | Ahmad Zhafri Zakaria |
| 77 | MF | MAS | Mohammad Fahmi Faizal |
| 80 | MF | MAS | Muhammad Nizaruddin Jazi |
| 95 | DF | FRA | Rodrigue Nanitelamio |

== Pre-season and friendlies ==
Win Draw Loss Fixtures

| 10 March 2024 Friendly | Johor Darul Ta'zim II | 3–2 | Melaka | Pasir Gudang, Johor |
| 20:45 UTC+8 | ? (?); ? (?); ? (?) | | ? (?); ? (?) | Stadium: Stadium MBPG |

| 26 March 2024 Friendly | Melaka | 1–0 | RAMD | Bandaraya Melaka, Malacca |
| 21:45 UTC+8 | ? (?) | | | Stadium: Stadium Hang Tuah |

| 4 April 2024 Friendly | Melaka | 0–3 | Kuala Lumpur City | Petaling Jaya, Selangor |
| 21:45 UTC+8 | | | ? (?); ? (?); ? (?) | Stadium: Padang Kompleks Sukan PKNS |

| 25 April 2024 Friendly | Melaka | 0–1 | Kuala Lumpur Rovers | Durian Tunggal, Malacca |
| 20:45 UTC+8 | | | ? (?) | Stadium: Stadium UTeM |

| 4 May 2024 Friendly | Kedah Darul Aman | 1–1 | Melaka | Alor Setar, Kedah |
| 20:45 UTC+8 | ? (?) | | ? (?) | Stadium: Stadium Darul Aman |

| 8 May 2024 Friendly | Melaka | 4–0 | Malaysian University | Bandaraya Melaka, Malacca |
| 21:00 UTC+8 | ? (?); ? (?); ? (?); ? (?) | | | Stadium: Stadium Hang Tuah |

| 15 May 2024 Friendly | Melaka | 3–1 | PDRM U23 | Krubong, Malacca |
| 21:00 UTC+8 | Issah Fusseni 15'; Hakeem Norizam 54'; Mohd Zulkifli Zakaria (?) | | ? (?) | Stadium: Stadium Hang Jebat |

| 21 May 2024 Friendly | Melaka | 1–0 | RAMD | Krubong, Malacca |
| 16:45 UTC+8 | Issah Fusseni 28' | | | Stadium: Stadium Hang Jebat |

| 25 May 2024 Friendly | Melaka | 4–3 | Selangor U23 | Krubong, Malacca |
| 18:00 UTC+8 | | | | Stadium: Stadium Hang Jebat |

== Competitions ==
=== Overall record ===
| Competition | First match | Last match | Starting round | Final position | Record | | | | | | | |
| Competition | First match | Last match | Starting round | Final position | Pld | W | D | L | GF | GA | GD | Win % |
|---|---|---|---|---|---|---|---|---|---|---|---|---|
| A1 Semi-Pro League | 1 June 2024 | TBA | Matchday 1 | 2nd (Ongoing) | 1 | 1 | 0 | 0 | 4 | 1 | +3 | 100.00 |
| Total | | | | | 1 | 1 | 0 | 0 | 4 | 1 | +3 | 100.00 |

Source: Soccerway

=== A1 Semi-Pro League ===
==== League table ====
| Pos | Team | Pld | W | D | L | GF | GA | GD | Pts | Qualification or relegation |
|---|---|---|---|---|---|---|---|---|---|---|
| 1 | Melaka (C) | 28 | 22 | 5 | 1 | 81 | 13 | +68 | 71 | Promoted to the 2025–26 Malaysia Super League & qualification to 2024–25 Malaysia Cup |
| 2 | Immigration | 28 | 18 | 9 | 1 | 62 | 20 | +42 | 63 | Promoted to 2025–26 Malaysia Super League |
| 3 | Kuala Lumpur Rovers | 28 | 16 | 8 | 4 | 54 | 24 | +30 | 56 | Qualified to 2024–25 Malaysia Cup & Relegated to A2 Amateur League |
| 4 | Bunga Raya Damansara | 28 | 17 | 4 | 7 | 60 | 26 | +34 | 55 | |
| 5 | Malaysian University | 28 | 14 | 6 | 8 | 63 | 31 | +32 | 48 | |

Source: FAM-CMS
Rules for classification: 1) Points; 2) Goal difference; 3) Number of goals scored.
(C) League champion

==== Results summary ====
| Overall | | | | | | | | Home | | | | | | Away | | | | | |
| Pld | W | D | L | GF | GA | GD | Pts | W | D | L | GF | GA | GD | W | D | L | GF | GA | GD |
|---|---|---|---|---|---|---|---|---|---|---|---|---|---|---|---|---|---|---|---|
| 1 | 1 | 0 | 0 | 4 | 1 | +3 | 3 | 0 | 0 | 0 | 0 | 0 | 0 | 1 | 0 | 0 | 4 | 1 | +3 |

Source: Soccerway

==== Results by matchday ====
| Round | 1 | 2 | 3 | 4 | 5 | 6 | 7 | 8 | 9 | 10 | 11 | 12 | 13 | 14 | 15 | 16 | 17 | 18 | 19 | 20 | 21 | 22 | 23 | 24 | 25 | 26 | 27 | 28 |
|---|---|---|---|---|---|---|---|---|---|---|---|---|---|---|---|---|---|---|---|---|---|---|---|---|---|---|---|---|
| Ground | A | H | A | A | | | | | | | | | | | | | | | | | | | | | | | | |
| Result | W | | | | | | | | | | | | | | | | | | | | | | | | | | | |
| Position | 2 | | | | | | | | | | | | | | | | | | | | | | | | | | | |
| Points | 3 | | | | | | | | | | | | | | | | | | | | | | | | | | | |

Source: FAM-CMS
A = Away; H = Home; W = Win; D = Draw; L = Loss; P = Postponed

==== Matches ====
The league fixtures were released by AFL.

Win Draw Loss

| 1 June 2024 1 | PIB Shah Alam | 1–4 | Melaka | Nilai, Negeri Sembilan |
| 16:45 UTC+8 | Aiman (yellow card) 21'; Syukri 30' | Report | Nasir 7'; Fuseini 38' (yellow card) 39'; Haziq (yellow card) 49'; Azim 83' (pen.); Nizaruddin 90' | Stadium: Stadium USIM; Attendance: 100; Referee: Muhammad Izzul Fikri Bin Kamaruzaman |
Note: Live on MYTV mana-mana

| 8 June 2024 2 | Melaka | 0–0 | Gombak | Krubong, Malacca |
| 20:45 UTC+8 | | Report | | Stadium: Stadium Hang Jebat |

| 22 June 2024 3 | Bukit Tambun | 0–1 | Melaka | Batu Kawan, Penang |
| 16:45 UTC+8 | | Report | Royizzat Daud 24' | Stadium: Stadium Negeri Pulau Pinang |

| 29 June 2024 4 | Manjung City | 0–2 | Melaka | Seri Manjung, Perak |
| 20:45 UTC+8 | | Report | Azim Rahim 10'; Fuseini Issah 38' | Stadium: Stadium Majlis Perbandaran Manjung |

| 13 July 2024 5 | Melaka | 3–1 | Harini | Krubong, Malacca |
| 21:45 UTC+8 | Azim Rahim 2' 7' 52' | Report | Amierul Ismail 28' | Stadium: Stadium Hang Jebat |

| 20 July 2024 6 | UiTM United | 0–3 | Melaka | Selangor, Shah Alam |
| 21:45 UTC+8 | | Report | Azim Rahim 37'; Fuseini Issah 71'; Nasir Basharudin 77' | Stadium: UiTM Stadium |

== Squad statistics ==
=== Appearances and goals ===
| No. | Pos | Nat | Player | Total | | A1 Semi-Pro League | |
| No. | Pos | Nat | Player | Apps | Goals | Apps | Goals |
Goalkeepers
| 1 | GK | (Malaysia) MAS | Shaheeswaran Thavakumar | 6 | 0 | 6 | 0 |
| 18 | GK | (Malaysia) MAS | Ahmad Solehin Mamat | 0 | 0 | 0 | 0 |
| 29 | GK | (Malaysia) MAS | Ameerul Eqhwan Mohd Fauzi | 0 | 0 | 0 | 0 |
Defenders
| 2 | DF | (Malaysia) MAS | Muhammad Aidil Azuan | 0 | 0 | 0 | 0 |
| 6 | DF | (Malaysia) MAS | Muhammad Firdaus Ya'akub | 0 | 0 | 0 | 0 |
| 13 | DF | (Malaysia) MAS | Jeremy Lim Wei Shen | 0 | 0 | 0 | 0 |
| 17 | DF | (Malaysia) MAS | Muhammad Zulkhairi Zulkeply | 1 | 0 | 1 | 0 |
| 25 | DF | (Malaysia) MAS | Khairul Anwar Shahrudin | 1 | 0 | 1 | 0 |
| 27 | DF | (Malaysia) MAS | Muhammad Hafiz Mohd Johar | 1 | 0 | 1 | 0 |
| 30 | DF | (Malaysia) MAS | Ahmad Haziq Ahmad Puad | 1 | 0 | 1 | 0 |
| 39 | DF | (Malaysia) MAS | Thaanush Sithiravelu | 0 | 0 | 0 | 0 |
| 74 | DF | (Malaysia) MAS | Ahmad Zhafri Zakaria | 0 | 0 | 0 | 0 |
Midfielders
| 4 | MF | (Malaysia) MAS | Mohamad Nasir Basharudin | 1 | 1 | 1 | 1 |
| 8 | MF | (Malaysia) MAS | Muhammad Syamierul Razmee | 0 | 0 | 0 | 0 |
| 14 | MF | (Malaysia) MAS | Mohamad Fakhrullah bin Rosli | 1 | 0 | 0+1 | 0 |
| 15 | MF | (Malaysia) MAS | Royizzat Daud | 1 | 0 | 0+1 | 0 |
| 16 | MF | (Nigeria) NGR | Michael Onyekachi Ozor | 1 | 0 | 1 | 0 |
| 19 | MF | (Malaysia) MAS | Durrkeswaran Ganasan | 1 | 0 | 1 | 0 |
| 23 | MF | (Malaysia) MAS | Muhammad Hakimy Mohd Khairol | 0 | 0 | 0 | 0 |
| 69 | MF | (Malaysia) MAS | Muhammad Fikri Mohamed Shah | 0 | 0 | 0 | 0 |
| 77 | MF | (Malaysia) MAS | Mohammad Fahmi Faizal | 1 | 0 | 0+1 | 0 |
| 80 | MF | (Malaysia) MAS | Muhammad Nizaruddin Jazi | 1 | 1 | 0+1 | 1 |
Forwards
| 10 | FW | (Malaysia) MAS | Mohd Zulkifli Zakaria | 1 | 0 | 0+1 | 0 |
| 11 | FW | (Ghana) GHA | Fuseini Issah | 1 | 1 | 1 | 1 |
| 12 | FW | (Malaysia) MAS | Abdul Azim Rahim | 1 | 6 | 1 | 6 |
| 20 | FW | (Malaysia) MAS | Muhammad Luqmanul Hakeem | 1 | 0 | 1 | 0 |

Source: Competitions

=== Goalkeepers clean sheets ===
| | | | | Clean sheets | |
| No. | Player | Apps. | Goals Against | A1 Semi-Pro League | Total |
|---|---|---|---|---|---|
| 1 | (Malaysia) Shaheeswaran Thavakumar | 6 | 2 | 4 | 4 |
| 18 | (Malaysia) Ahmad Solehin Mamat | 0 | 0 | 0 | 0 |
| 29 | (Malaysia) Ameerul Eqhwan Mohd Fauzi | 0 | 0 | 0 | 0 |
| Totals | | | 2 | 4 | 4 |

=== Disciplinary record ===
| Rank | No. | Pos. | Player | A1 Semi-Pro League | | | Total | | |
| Rank | No. | Pos. | Player | Yellow card | (yellow card) (yellow-red card) | Red card | Yellow card | (yellow card) (yellow-red card) | Red card |
|---|---|---|---|---|---|---|---|---|---|
| 1 | 11 | FW | (Ghana) Fuseini Issah | 2 | 0 | 0 | 2 | 0 | 0 |
| 1 | 12 | FW | (Malaysia) Abdul Azim Rahim | 2 | 0 | 0 | 2 | 0 | 0 |
| 1 | 30 | DF | (Malaysia) Ahmad Haziq Ahmad Puad | 2 | 0 | 0 | 2 | 0 | 0 |
| 2 | 1 | GK | (Malaysia) T. Shaheswaran | 1 | 0 | 0 | 1 | 0 | 0 |
| 2 | 10 | FW | (Malaysia) Zulkifli Zakaria | 1 | 0 | 0 | 1 | 0 | 0 |
| 2 | 27 | DF | (Malaysia) Hafiz Johar | 1 | 0 | 0 | 1 | 0 | 0 |
| Total | | | | 9 | 0 | 0 | 9 | 0 | 0 |
