= Fadhil Idris =

Malaysian footballer (born 1996)

Personal information
- Full name: Muhammad Fadhil bin Idris
- Date of birth: 29 July 1996 (age 30)
- Place of birth: Perak, Malaysia
- Height: 1.72 m (5 ft 8 in)
- Position: Central midfielder

Team information
- Current team: Perak FA
- Number: 4

Youth career
- –2015: Perak

Senior career*
Years	Team	Apps	(Gls)
2016–2019	PKNP	45	(0)
2020	Felda United	10	(0)
2021	Penang	7	(0)
2022	Melaka United	18	(0)
2023–2025	Perak		
2025–	Perak FA		
- * Club domestic league appearances and goals

Muhammad Fadhil bin Idris (born 29 July 1996) is a Malaysian professional footballer who plays as a central midfielder for Malaysia A1 Semi-Pro League club Perak FA.

== Career statistics ==
=== Club ===
As of match played 12 September 2022

Appearances and goals by club, season and competition
Club	Season	League			Cup		League Cup		Continental		Total	
Club	Season	Division	Apps	Goals	Apps	Goals	Apps	Goals	Apps	Goals	Apps	Goals
Felda United	2020	Malaysia Super League	10	0	—		—		—		10	0
Felda United	Total		10	0	—		—		—		10	0
Penang	2021	Malaysia Super League	7	0	—		5	0	—		12	0
Penang	Total		7	0	—		5	0	—		12	0
Melaka United	2022	Malaysia Super League	18	0	2	0	—		—		20	0
Melaka United	Total		18	0	2	0	—		—		20	0
Perak	2023	Malaysia Super League	0	0	0	0	0	0	—		0	0
