= 2024–25 PDRM FC season =

Polis Di-Raja Malaysia
2024–25 season
- CEO: Mohamad Hafiz Zainal Abidin
- Head coach: Yunus Alif (until 3 April 2024); P. Maniam (6 April 2025–25 February 2025); Eddy Gapil (caretaker)
- Stadium: Selayang Stadium
- Malaysia Super League: 9th
- Malaysia FA Cup: Round of 16
- Malaysia Cup: Round of 16
- MFL Challenge Cup: Runners-up
- Top goalscorer: League: Ifedayo Olusegun (8); All: Ifedayo Olusegun (12)
Home colours	Away colours	Third colours

The 2024–25 season was Polis Di-Raja Malaysia Football Club's 34th season in the football club's history and 2nd season in the top flight of Malaysian football, Malaysia Super League since promoted in 2022. In addition to the domestic league, the team participated in the Malaysia FA Cup and the Malaysia Cup.

== Players ==
=== First-team squad ===
Note: Flags indicate national team as defined under FIFA eligibility rules; some limited exceptions apply. Players may hold more than one non-FIFA nationality.

No.	Pos.	Nation	Player
1	GK	MAS	Bryan See
3	DF	MAS	Iqbal Azmi
4	DF	MAS	Aliff Najmi
5	DF	NGA	Faith Friday Obilor
6	MF	MYA	Kyaw Min Oo
7	MF	KOR	Deuk Um
8	MF	MAS	Zuhair Aizat
9	FW	JPN	Bruno Suzuki
10	FW	MAS	Shahrel Fikri
11	FW	MAS	Hadi Fayyadh
12	FW	NGA	Ifedayo Olusegun
13	DF	MAS	Badrul Affendy
14	DF	MAS	Amirul Hakim
16	MF	MAS	Shazrin Abu Samah
17	MF	MAS	Amirul Wa'ie
19	DF	MAS	Amir Saiful (captain)
21	DF	MAS	Zazrir Naim

No.	Pos.	Nation	Player
23	MF	NGA	Chidi Osuchukwu
26	DF	MAS	Alif Naquiddin
27	FW	MAS	Imran Samso
29	DF	MAS	Izaaq Izhan
30	MF	NGA	Aremu Timothy
32	DF	MAS	Safiee Ahmad
33	GK	MAS	Asri Muhamad
34	MF	MAS	Eizrul Ashraf
40	MF	MAS	Aqil Hilman
46	GK	MAS	Hakeem Hamidun
50	FW	MAS	Syakimi Karim
51	FW	MAS	Hakimi Mat Isa
52	MF	MAS	Aliff Hasmardi
53	MF	MAS	Asyraf Ahmad Kamal
55	MF	MAS	Shafizi Iqmal
66	MF	MAS	Fakhrullah Yusoff
77	MF	JOR	Fadi Awad
88	GK	MAS	Rendy Rining
89	MF	MAS	Fakhrul Azim

== Competitions ==
=== Overview ===
Competition	First match	Last match	Starting round	Final position	Record							
Competition	First match	Last match	Starting round	Final position	Pld	W	D	L	GF	GA	GD	Win %
Malaysia Super League	11 May 2024	19 April 2025	Matchday 1	9th	24	7	6	11	25	36	−11	29.17
Malaysia FA Cup	12 June 2024		Round of 16	Round of 16	1	0	0	1	0	3	−3	0.00
Malaysia Cup	24 November 2024	29 November 2024	Round of 16	Round of 16	2	1	0	1	2	4	−2	50.00
MFL Challenge Cup	10 December 2024	22 February 2025	Quarter-finals	Runners-up	6	1	3	2	8	14	−6	16.67
Total					33	9	9	15	35	57	−22	27.27

Last updated: 19 April 2025
Source: Competitions

=== Malaysia Super League ===
11 May 2024 1	PDRM	0–1	Kedah Darul Aman
		Report

18 May 2024 2	Perak	2–3	PDRM
		Report	Olusegun 24', 90+12'; Suzuki 72'

25 May 2024 3	PDRM	1–1	Penang
	Olusegun 32'	Report

23 June 2024 4	Kelantan Darul Naim	1–0	PDRM
		Report

12 July 2024 5	Kuching City	2–0	PDRM
		Report

31 July 2024 6	PDRM	1–1	Johor Darul Ta'zim
	Shahrel 22'	Report

11 August 2024 7	Negeri Sembilan	1–2	PDRM
	Shahrel 53'; Suzuki 58'	Report

16 August 2024 8	PDRM	2–1	Kuala Lumpur City
	Olusegun 9'; Awad 65'	Report

15 September 2024 9	Sri Pahang	5–1	PDRM
		Report	Suzuki 73'

21 September 2024 10	PDRM	1–0	Sabah
	Olusegun 80'	Report

4 October 2024 11	Terengganu	1–1	PDRM
		Report	Osuchukwu 53'

19 October 2024 12	PDRM	1–1	Selangor
	Timothy 90+2'	Report

25 October 2024 13	Kedah Darul Aman	1–1	PDRM
		Report	Timothy 56'

2 November 2024 14	PDRM	1–1	Kedah Darul Aman
	Timothy 56'	Report

4 December 2024 15	Penang	2–0	PDRM
		Report

18 December 2024 16	PDRM	5–0	Kelantan Darul Naim
	Olusegun 5', 33', 40'; Shahrel 66', 71'	Report

11 January 2025 17	PDRM	0–2	Kuching City
		Report

5 February 2025 18	Johor Darul Ta'zim	4–0	PDRM
		Report

26 February 2025 19	Kuala Lumpur City	2–1	PDRM
		Report	Osuchukwu 90+2'

8 March 2025 20	PDRM	1–3	Sri Pahang
	Suzuki 52'	Report

15 March 2025 21	PDRM	2–1	Negeri Sembilan
	Suzuki 72' (pen.), 86' (pen.)	Report

8 April 2025 22	Sabah	1–0	PDRM
		Report

12 April 2025 23	PDRM	1–0	Terengganu
	Imran 48'	Report

19 April 2025 24	Selangor	2–0	PDRM
		Report

Pos	Team	Pld	W	D	L	GF	GA	GD	Pts	Qualification or relegation
7	Perak	24	8	6	10	36	36	0	30	Withdrawn from Super League (Note: Perak and Sri Pahang withdrew at end of season and dissolved. Not applying for a national licence.)
8	Sri Pahang	24	7	8	9	35	39	−4	29	Withdrawn from Super League
9	PDRM	24	7	6	11	24	35	−11	27	
10	Penang	24	6	8	10	31	38	−7	26	
11	Kedah Darul Aman (Note: MFL officially snubs Kedah Darul Aman club licensing approval.)	24	6	6	12	21	51	−30	21 (Note: On 5 April 2024, Kedah Darul Aman were deducted three points for failing to pay players and staff on time following previous MFL rules breaches in the 2023 season.)	Ejected from Super League and relegated to A1 Semi-Pro League

Source: MFL
Rules for classification: 1) Points; 2) Goal difference; 3) Goals scored;

=== Malaysia FA Cup ===
12 June 2024 Round of 16	PDRM	0–3	Malaysian University
		Report

=== Malaysia Cup ===
Round of 16

24 November 2024 1st leg	Negeri Sembilan	1–2	PDRM
		Report	Hadi 90+6'; Olusegun 90+8'

29 November 2024 2nd leg	PDRM	0–3 (2–4 agg.)	Negeri Sembilan
		Report

== Statistics ==
=== Appearances and goals ===
Includes all competitions. Players with no appearances not included in the list.

As of 22 February 2025

No.	Pos	Nat	Player	Total		Malaysia Super League		Malaysia FA Cup		Malaysia Cup		MFL Challenge Cup	
No.	Pos	Nat	Player	Apps	Goals	Apps	Goals	Apps	Goals	Apps	Goals	Apps	Goals
Goalkeepers
1	GK	(Malaysia) MAS	Bryan See	22	0	14+1	0	0	0	2	0	5	0
33	GK	(Malaysia) MAS	Asri Muhamad	1	0	0	0	1	0	0	0	0	0
46	GK	(Malaysia) MAS	Hakeem Hamidun	9	0	8	0	0	0	0	0	0+1	0
88	GK	(Malaysia) MAS	Rendy Rining	3	0	2	0	0	0	0	0	1	0
Defenders
3	DF	(Malaysia) MAS	Iqbal Azmi	1	0	0	0	1	0	0	0	0	0
4	DF	(Malaysia) MAS	Aliff Najmi	8	0	3+5	0	0	0	0	0	0	0
5	DF	(Nigeria) NGA	Faith Friday Obilor	30	0	22	0	0	0	2	0	6	0
13	DF	(Malaysia) MAS	Badrul Affendy	20	1	14	0	1	0	2	0	3	1
14	DF	(Malaysia) MAS	Amirul Hakim	1	0	0	0	1	0	0	0	0	0
19	DF	(Malaysia) MAS	Amir Saiful	24	0	17+2	0	0	0	2	0	2+1	0
21	DF	(Malaysia) MAS	Zazrir Naim	4	0	1+2	0	1	0	0	0	0	0
26	DF	(Malaysia) MAS	Alif Naquiddin	24	0	14+4	0	0+1	0	0	0	2+3	0
29	DF	(Malaysia) MAS	Izaaq Izhan	13	0	4+6	0	1	0	0+2	0	0	0
32	DF	(Malaysia) MAS	Safiee Ahmad	28	0	20+1	0	0	0	2	0	4+1	0
Midfielders
6	MF	(Myanmar) MYA	Kyaw Min Oo	30	0	21+1	0	0	0	2	0	6	0
7	MF	(South Korea) KOR	Deuk Um	3	0	0+2	0	0	0	0	0	0+1	0
8	MF	(Malaysia) MAS	Zuhair Aizat	11	0	0+9	0	1	0	0	0	0+1	0
17	MF	(Malaysia) MAS	Amirul Wa'ie	10	0	0+7	0	1	0	0	0	0+2	0
23	MF	(Nigeria) NGA	Chidi Osuchukwu	16	2	8+6	2	0	0	0	0	1+1	0
30	MF	(Nigeria) NGA	Aremu Timothy	24	3	14+4	3	0	0	1+1	0	3+1	0
34	MF	(Malaysia) MAS	Eizrul Ashraf	26	1	7+11	0	0+1	0	1+1	0	1+4	1
53	MF	(Malaysia) MAS	Asyraf Ahmad Kamal	1	0	0	0	1	0	0	0	0	0
55	MF	(Malaysia) MAS	Shafizi Iqmal	13	1	0+9	0	1	0	0	0	0+3	1
66	MF	(Malaysia) MAS	Fakhrullah Yusoff	6	0	0+3	0	0	0	0	0	0+3	0
77	MF	(Jordan) JOR	Fadi Awad	30	1	23	1	0	0	2	0	5	0
89	MF	(Malaysia) MAS	Fakhrul Azim	26	1	11+7	0	0	0	0+2	0	6	1
Forwards
9	FW	(Japan) JPN	Bruno Suzuki	31	7	23	6	0	0	2	0	4+2	1
10	FW	(Malaysia) MAS	Shahrel Fikri	31	5	15+8	4	0	0	2	0	6	1
11	FW	(Malaysia) MAS	Hadi Fayyadh	21	2	4+10	0	0	0	0+2	1	3+2	1
12	FW	(Nigeria) NGA	Ifedayo Olusegun	25	12	14+4	8	0	0	2	1	5	3
27	FW	(Malaysia) MAS	Imran Samso	13	1	4+4	1	0	0	0	0	3+2	0
50	FW	(Malaysia) MAS	Syakimi Karim	1	0	0	0	1	0	0	0	0	0
51	FW	(Malaysia) MAS	Hakimi Mat Isa	1	0	0	0	0+1	0	0	0	0	0
54	FW	(Malaysia) MAS	Nazrin Nasir	1	0	0	0	0+1	0	0	0	0	0
Players transferred/loaned out during the season
7	FW	(Nigeria) NGA	Prince Obus Aggreh	5	0	3+2	0	0	0	0	0	0	0
11	MF	(Malaysia) MAS	Hidhir Idris	1	0	0	0	0+1	0	0	0	0	0

Source: Competitions
