= Wan Amirul Afiq Wan Abdul Rahman =

Malaysian footballer

Wan Amirul Afiq
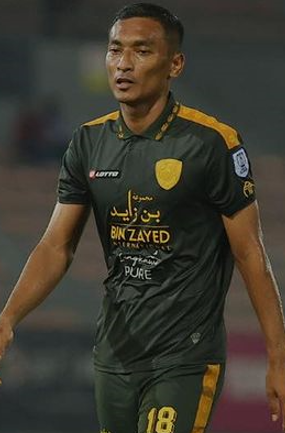
- Afiq playing for Kedah

Personal information
- Full name: Wan Amirul Afiq bin Wan Ab Rahman
- Date of birth: 18 July 1992 (age 34)
- Place of birth: Tumpat, Malaysia
- Height: 1.78 m (5 ft 10 in)
- Positions: Right-back; left-back; wing-back

Team information
- Current team: Kelantan The Real Warriors
- Number: 11

Youth career
- 2013: Kelantan U-21
- 2015: Young Fighters

Senior career*
Years	Team	Apps	(Gls)
2016	Melaka United	15	(1)
2017–2018	Felda United	29	(0)
2019–2022	Melaka United	69	(1)
2023–2025	Kedah Darul Aman	41	(1)
2025–	Kelantan TRW	4	(0)
- * Club domestic league appearances and goals as of 20 September 2025

Wan Amirul Afiq bin Wan Ab Rahman (born 18 July 1992) is a Malaysian professional footballer who plays as a right-back for Malaysia Super League club Kelantan TRW. Primarily a right-back, he is also capable of playing as a left-back on occasion.

== Club career ==
=== Kedah Darul Aman ===
In December 2022, Wan Amirul Afiq signed a two-year contract with Malaysia Super League club Kedah Darul Aman.

== Career statistics ==
=== Club ===
As of match played 25 June 2025

Appearances and goals by club, season and competition
Club	Season	League			Cup		League Cup		Continental		Total	
Club	Season	Division	Apps	Goals	Apps	Goals	Apps	Goals	Apps	Goals	Apps	Goals
Melaka United	2016	Malaysia Premier League	15	1	1	0	6	0	–		22	1
Melaka United	Total		15	1	1	0	6	0	–		22	1
Felda United	2017	Malaysia Super League	16	0	0	0	7	0	5	0	28	0
Felda United	2018	Malaysia Premier League	13	0	4	0	6	1	–		23	1
Felda United	Total		29	0	4	0	13	1	5	0	51	1
Melaka United	2019	Malaysia Super League	19	0	1	0	1	0	–		21	0
Melaka United	2020	Malaysia Super League	11	1	0	0	1	0	–		12	1
Melaka United	2021	Malaysia Super League	20	0	–		6	0	–		26	0
Melaka United	2022	Malaysia Super League	19	0	2	0	–		–		21	0
Melaka United	Total		69	1	3	0	8	0	–	–	80	1
Kedah Darul Aman	2023	Malaysia Super League	24	1	1	0	2	0	–		27	1
Kedah Darul Aman	2024–25	Malaysia Super League	17	0	3	0	1	0	–		21	0
Kedah Darul Aman	Total		41	1	4	0	3	0	–	–	48	1
Kelantan The Real Warriors	2025–26	Malaysia Super League	4	0	2	0	0	0	–		6	0
Kelantan The Real Warriors	Total		4	0	2	0	0	0	–	–	6	0
Career Total			0	0	0	0	0	0	–	–	0	0

== Honours ==
Melaka United

- Malaysia Premier League: 2016

Felda United

- Malaysia Premier League: 2018
