= Wan Zaharulnizam Zakaria =

Malaysian footballer

Wan Zaharulnizam
Personal information
- Birth name: Wan Zaharulnizam bin Wan Zakaria
- Date of birth: 8 May 1991 (age 35)
- Place of birth: Tumpat, Kelantan, Malaysia
- Height: 1.66 m (5 ft 5 1/2 in)
- Position: Winger

Team information
- Current team: Kelantan WTS
- Number: 8

Youth career
- 2009–2010: Kelantan U21

Senior career*
Years	Team	Apps	(Gls)
2010–2011	Harimau Muda B	34	(12)
2011–2013	Harimau Muda A	32	(3)
2014–2016	Kelantan Darul Naim	36	(7)
2017–2019	Sri Pahang	51	(4)
2020	Kelantan Darul Naim	7	(0)
2021–2022	Melaka United	31	(4)
2025–	Kelantan WTS		

International career
2011–2012	Malaysia U21	18	(6)
2011–2014	Malaysia U23	16	(6)
2011	Malaysia	2	(0)
Medal record
Men's football
Representing Malaysia
AFF Championship
Runner-up	2014
Malaysia U23
SEA Games
First place	2011
- * Club domestic league appearances and goals

Wan Zaharulnizam bin Wan Zakaria (born 8 May 1991) is a Malaysian professional footballer who plays as a winger for Kelantan WTS.

== Club career ==
=== Early career ===
Zaharul began his football career playing for Kelantan President's Cup team in 2010 at age 20, before been discovered by Ong Kim Swee to play for Harimau Muda. He has been in the Harimau Muda setup since 2010, beginning with Harimau Muda B and promoted to Harimau Muda A in 2011.

=== F.C. Ryūkyū ===
Malaysian media reported in early March 2012 that Zaharul, along with teammate Zack Haikal, were to attend trial with Japan Football League side F.C. Ryūkyū after impressing the Japanese side talent spotter during Malaysia's 2–0 defeat to Japan in the 2012 Olympic qualifiers match in Tosu. They successfully completed the 2-week trial with the Japanese club in July.

In March 2013, Zack Haikal was officially offered a two-year contract, but Zaharul was not. Instead, 19-year-old Nazirul Naim was offered a contract instead.

=== Kelantan ===
In November 2013, Zaharul signed two years contract with his hometown side Kelantan.

=== Pahang ===
In December 2016, Zaharul left Kelantan for Pahang. It was announced by his sports representative agency, MVP Sports Agency via their social media that Zaharul have joined Pahang for the 2017 season. Zaharul made his league debut for Pahang in 5–0 win over T-Team on 27 January 2017.

== Career statistics ==
=== Club ===
As of 4 September 2021

Club	Season	League			Cup		League Cup		Continental		Total	
Club	Season	Division	Apps	Goals	Apps	Goals	Apps	Goals	Apps	Goals	Apps	Goals
Harimau Muda A	2011	Malaysia Super League	19	1	0	0	0	0	-		19	1
Harimau Muda A	Total		19	1	0	0	0	0	-		19	1
Harimau Muda A	2012	S. League	13	2	0	0	0	0	-		13	2
Harimau Muda A	2013	S. League	0	0	0	0	0	0	-		0	0
Harimau Muda A	Total		13	2	0	0	0	0	-		13	2
Kelantan	2014	Malaysia Super League	3	2	5	1	5	1	6	3	19	7
Kelantan	2015	Malaysia Super League	18	2	6	1	6	0	-		30	3
Kelantan	2016	Malaysia Super League	15	3	2	0	5	2	-		22	5
Kelantan	Total		36	7	13	2	16	3	6	3	71	15
Pahang	2017	Malaysia Super League	15	2	7	0	7	3	-		29	5
Pahang	2018	Malaysia Super League	17	1	6	1	8	0	-		31	2
Pahang	2019	Malaysia Super League	19	1	6	1	1	0	-		26	2
Pahang	Total		51	4	19	2	16	3	0	0	86	9
Kelantan	2020	Malaysia Premier League	7	0	0	0	0	0	-		0	0
Kelantan	Total		7	0	0	0	0	0	0	0	7	0
Melaka United	2021	Malaysia Super League	14	2	–		5	0	–		19	2
Melaka United	2022	Malaysia Super League	17	2	2	0	–		–		19	2
Melaka United	Total		31	4	2	0	5	0	–		38	4
Career total			0	0	0	0	0	0	0	0	0	0

== International career ==
Zaharulnizam made his international debut for the Malaysia national team in a friendly match with Australia, where Malaysia suffered a heavy 5–0 defeat, on 7 October 2011.

He is also a member of the Malaysia U-23 team, who were competing in the 2012 Olympic qualifiers. He also helped Malaysia to retain the men's football gold medal in the 2011 SEA Games.

=== Under-23 ===
#	Date	Venue	Opponent	Score	Result	Competition
1.	13 November 2011	Gelora Bung Karno Stadium	Cambodia	4–1	4–1 (W)	2011 SEA Games
2.	25 June 2012	Bogyoke Aung San Stadium	Philippines	4–0	7–0 (W)	2013 AFC U-22 Asian Cup qualification

== Honours ==
=== Club ===
Kelantan

- Malaysia FA Cup runner-up: 2015

Sri Pahang

- Malaysia FA Cup: 2018, runner-up 2017

=== International ===
Harimau Muda A

- International U-21 Thanh Niên Newspaper Cup (1): 2012

Malaysia U-23

- Southeast Asian Games Gold Medal (1): 2011
- Merdeka Tournament (1): 2013

=== Individual ===
- PFAM Player of the Month: May 2015

== Personal life ==
Zaharul, is also known by his nickname 'Kecik' due to his small stature.
