= Faisal Rosli =

Malaysian footballer

Personal information
- Full name: Mohd Faisal bin Mohd Rosli
- Date of birth: 29 January 1991 (age 35)
- Place of birth: Rompin, Pahang, Malaysia
- Height: 1.70 m (5 ft 7 in)
- Position: Left back

Team information
- Current team: YPM FC
- Number: 14

Youth career
- 2011—2012: Sri Pahang U-21

Senior career*
Years	Team	Apps	(Gls)
2013—2021	Sri Pahang	89	(3)
2022	Kelantan United	13	(0)
2024–	YPM FC		

International career^{‡}
2017	Malaysia	0	(0)
- * Club domestic league appearances and goals as of 4 January 2023 ‡ National team caps and goals as of 14:00, 5 September 2017 (UTC)

Mohd Faisal bin Mohd Rosli (born 29 January 1991) is a Malaysian professional footballer who plays as a left back for Malaysia A2 Amateur League club Yayasan Pahang Maintenance.

== International career ==
On 2 June 2017, Faisal received his first call-up to the Malaysia national team to attend central training camp in Johor Bahru, on 29 May, to prepare for the first Group B match of 2019 AFC Asian Cup qualification to meet Lebanon on 13 June 2017. However he did not play in the game and was on the bench.

== Career statistics ==
=== Club ===
As of 1 July 2018.

Appearances and goals by club, season and competition
Club	Season	League			Cup		League Cup		Continental		Total	
Club	Season	Division	Apps	Goals	Apps	Goals	Apps	Goals	Apps	Goals	Apps	Goals
Sri Pahang	2015	Malaysia Super League	1	0	0	0	1	0	–		2	0
Sri Pahang	2016	Malaysia Super League	15	1	1	0	0	0	–		0	1
Sri Pahang	2017	Malaysia Super League	16	1	7	0	5	0	–		28	1
Sri Pahang	2018	Malaysia Super League	18	0	7	0	4	0	–		29	0
Sri Pahang	2019	Malaysia Super League	15	0	5	0	0	0	–		20	0
Sri Pahang	2020	Malaysia Super League	6	0	–		–		–		6	0
Sri Pahang	2020	Malaysia Super League	18	0	–		3	0	–		21	0
Sri Pahang	Total		0	0	0	0	0	0	0	0	0	0
Career total			0	0	0	0	0	0	0	0	0	0

== Honours ==
Sri Pahang

- Malaysia Cup: 2013, 2014
- Malaysia FA Cup: 2014, 2018 Runner-up: 2017
- Malaysia Super League runner-up: 2015, 2017, 2019
