= Shahrel Fikri =

Malaysian footballer

Personal information
- Full name: Muhammad Shahrel Fikri bin Mohd Fauzi
- Date of birth: 17 October 1994 (age 32)
- Place of birth: Tawau, Malaysia
- Height: 1.80 m (5 ft 11 in)
- Position: Forward

Team information
- Current team: Penang

Youth career
- 2013–2015: Perak U-21

Senior career*
Years	Team	Apps	(Gls)
2016–2019	PKNP	53	(29)
2018	→ Nakhon Ratchasima (loan)	10	(1)
2019	→ Perak (loan)	18	(1)
2019–2020	Perak	11	(10)
2021–2022	Selangor	30	(2)
2023	Negeri Sembilan	19	(7)
2024	PDRM	25	(4)
2025–2026	Melaka	22	(1)
2026–	Penang	0	(0)

International career
2017–	Malaysia	20	(5)
Medal record
Men's football
Representing Malaysia
AFF Championship
Runner-up	2018
- * Club domestic league appearances and goals as of 14 August 2025

Muhammad Shahrel Fikri bin Mohd Fauzi (born 17 October 1994) is a Malaysian professional footballer who plays as a forward for Malaysia Super League club Penang and the Malaysia national team. He is affectionately known as Eky by his fans and supporters.

== Club career ==
=== Beginnings ===
Shahrel was born in Tawau, Sabah, but was raised in Sitiawan in Manjung, a district that is approximately 80 km southwest of Ipoh, Perak. Shahrel began his football career at Perak U-21 in 2013 as the team played in Malaysia President Cup and King's Gold Cup. He managed to score 10 goals during his debut season and has scored 30 goals over 3 seasons with the team. Shahrel also represented Perak state team in 2014 Sukma Games hosted by Perlis. He scored 2 goals as Perak beat Johor 3–1 in the final.

Shahrel has been offered a contract to play with Harimau Muda B in early 2014 but failed the medical test due to a heart problem.

=== PKNP FC ===
Shahrel joined Malaysia FAM League club PKNP FC in 2016 from Perak U-21 team. He made his league debut in 0–0 draw in away match against KDMM coming from bench on 28 February 2016. His first and second goals for PKNP FC came from 0–5 win over PBMM on 9 March 2017. Shahrel made 20 appearances and scored 13 goals in his debut season with PKNP FC.

After the end of the 2017 domestic season, Shahrel was rumoured to be on his way out of the club; however, in a surprising turn of events, the club announced that Shahrel had instead extended his contract with the team until 2020. A whole host of clubs have been linked with the signature of Shahrel including Perak, Terengganu and Johor Darul Ta'zim.

=== Nakhon Ratchasima ===
Shahrel became the third-ever Malaysian to play in the Thai League 1, after he joined Nakhon Ratchasima on loan, on 25 June 2018. He made his debut for Nakhon Ratchasima in a 1–1 draw against Sukhothai on 30 June 2018. Shahrel scored his first goal in a League Cup tie against Ranong United, scoring the equaliser in the 73rd minute of the match, with the match finishing 3–2.

=== Negeri Sembilan FC ===
He was officially announced as a new Negeri Sembilan FC player on 8 January 2023. He scored his first goal for the club against TRW Kelantan as his side won 4-2 on 2 April 2023.

=== PDRM FC ===
Shahrel joined PDRM after leaving Negeri Sembilan, becoming the club's marquee signing of the transfer window after signing another nine local players.

During the first few months, Shahrel was demoted to the U-23 team to maintain match sharpness and increase playing time. The lack of opportunities was attributed to PDRM's recent signings of foreign players.

On 31 July 2024, Shahrel scored his first goal for the club against the reigning champions Johor Darul Ta'zim in a shock 1-1 draw in a Malaysia Super League tie. In the next gameweek, he proved instrumental in a 2-1 win against his former club Negeri Sembilan, scoring and assisting once to put PDRM eighth in the league.

=== Melaka FC ===
On 24 May 2025, Shahrel Fikri joined his former Negeri Sembilan manager K. Devan after leaving PDRM.

=== Penang FC ===
On 17 July 2026, Shahrel was unveiled as a Penang FC player after leaving Melaka. He is the seventh player to join the club on a permanent transfer during the same transfer window.

== International career ==
On 4 August 2017, Shahrel was called up for the Malaysia national team central training camp from 14 August to prepare for three international friendly matches along with the second Group B match of 2019 AFC Asian Cup qualification against Hong Kong on 5 September 2017.

Shahrel made his debut for Malaysia national team in a 1–2 friendly loss against Syria, replacing Syazwan Zainon for the final 23 minutes in Malacca, Malaysia. On 10 September 2018, Shahrel scored his first international goal in the match against Cambodia. Shahrel scored his first international hat-trick in the joint World Cup 2022 and Asia Cup 2023 qualifier match against Timor Leste on June 11, 2019.

== Career statistics ==
=== Club ===
As of 31 December 2023

Club	Season	League			Cup (Note: Includes Malaysia FA Cup and Thai FA Cup)		League Cup (Note: Includes Malaysia Cup and Thai League Cup)		Continental/Others		Total	
Club	Season	Division	Apps	Goals	Apps	Goals	Apps	Goals	Apps	Goals	Apps	Goals
PKNP
PKNP	2016	Malaysia FAM League	20	13	–	–	–	–	–	–	20	13
PKNP	2017	Malaysia Premier League	21	11	4	3	7	6	–	–	32	20
PKNP	2018	Malaysia Super League	12	5	5	4	0	0	–	–	17	9
PKNP	Total		53	29	9	7	7	6	–	–	69	42
Nakhon Ratchasima (loan)
Nakhon Ratchasima (loan)	2018	Thai League 1	10	1	0	0	2	1	–	–	12	2
Nakhon Ratchasima (loan)	Total		10	1	0	0	2	1	–	–	12	2
Perak (loan)	2019	Malaysia Super League	18	1	6	1	8	2	–	–	32	4
Perak	2020	Malaysia Super League	11	10	0	0	1	0	–	–	12	10
Perak	Total		29	11	6	1	9	2	–	–	44	14
Selangor	2021	Malaysia Super League	12	1	–	–	6	1	–	–	18	2
Selangor	2022	Malaysia Super League	13	1	3	0	3	0	–	–	19	1
Selangor	Total		25	2	3	0	9	1	–	–	37	3
Negeri Sembilan	2023	Malaysia Super League	16	6	2	1	0	0	–	–	18	7
Negeri Sembilan	Total		16	6	2	1	0	0	–	–	18	7
PDRM	2024–25	Malaysia Super League	23	4	0	0	2	0	6 (Note: Appearances in MFL Challenge Cup)	1	31	5
PDRM	Total		23	4	0	0	2	0	6	1	31	5
Career total			134	49	20	9	27	10	0	0	181	68

=== International ===
As of 20 June 2023

Appearances and goals by national team and year
National team	Year	Apps	Goals
Malaysia	2017	1	0
Malaysia	2018	11	1
Malaysia	2019	3	4
Malaysia	2021	4	0
Malaysia	2023	1	0
Total		20	5

==== International goals ====
As of match played 11 June 2019. Malaysia score listed first, score column indicates score after each Shahrel Fikri goal.

International goals by date, venue, cap, opponent, score, result and competition
No.	Date	Venue	Cap	Opponent	Score	Result	Competition
1	10 September 2018	Phnom Penh Olympic Stadium, Phnom Penh, Cambodia	5	Cambodia	3–1	3–1	Friendly
2	7 June 2019	Bukit Jalil National Stadium, Bukit Jalil, Malaysia	13	Timor-Leste	2–0	7–1	2022 FIFA World Cup qualification
3	11 June 2019	Bukit Jalil National Stadium, Bukit Jalil, Malaysia	14	Timor-Leste	1–0	5–1	2022 FIFA World Cup qualification
4	11 June 2019	Bukit Jalil National Stadium, Bukit Jalil, Malaysia	14	Timor-Leste	2–0	5–1	2022 FIFA World Cup qualification
5	11 June 2019	Bukit Jalil National Stadium, Bukit Jalil, Malaysia	14	Timor-Leste	5–0	5–1	2022 FIFA World Cup qualification

== Honours ==
=== Youth ===
Perak U21

- Sukma Games

(gold) Gold Medal: 2014

=== Club ===
PKNP FC

- Malaysia FAM League runner-up: 2016

Selangor

- Malaysia Cup runner-up: 2022

Perak

- Malaysia FA Cup runner-up: 2019
- Malaysia Charity Shield runner-up: 2019

Individual
FAM Football Awards

- Best Striker Award: 2017
