= Amirul Hamer =

Malaysian footballer

Personal information
- Full name: Amirul bin Hamer
- Date of birth: 27 February 1998 (age 28)
- Place of birth: Malacca, Malaysia
- Height: 1.73 m (5 ft 8 in)
- Positions: Centre-back; right-back; defensive midfielder

Team information
- Current team: Kelantan

Youth career
- –2020: Melaka United U21

Senior career*
Years	Team	Apps	(Gls)
2021	Melaka United	1	(0)
2022–	Kelantan	0	(0)

International career^{‡}
	Malaysia U16	0	(0)
	Malaysia U19	0	(0)
- * Club domestic league appearances and goals as of 12 September 2021 ‡ National team caps and goals as of 23 March 2019

Amirul bin Hamer (born 27 February 1998) is a Malaysian professional footballer who plays for Malaysia Premier League club Kelantan.

== Club career ==
=== Melaka United ===
Amirul made his debut for the club in a Malaysia Super League match against Kedah Darul Aman on 12 September 2021.
