= Yamil Romero =

Argentine footballer

Personal information
- Full name: Yamil Jorge Gonzalo Romero
- Date of birth: 11 July 1995 (age 31)
- Place of birth: Berazategui, Argentina
- Height: 1.80 m (5 ft 11 in)
- Position: Attacking midfielder

Team information
- Current team: AO Ayia Napa
- Number: 10

Youth career
- 2011–2014: Boca Juniors

Senior career*
Years	Team	Apps	(Gls)
2014–2016	Boca Juniors	0	(0)
2016	→ Juventud Unida (Loan)	5	(0)
2017	Pahang FA	7	(2)
2018–2019	Ayia Napa	28	(7)
2019–2021	Deportivo Riestra	11	(0)
2021–2023	AO Ayia Napa	13	(2)
2023	Unión Magdalena	15	(1)
2023–	AO Ayia Napa	35	(0)
- * Club domestic league appearances and goals as of 26 June 2025

Yamil Romero (born 11 July 1995) is an Argentine footballer who plays for AO Ayia Napa.

During the mid season transfer of the 2017 Malaysia Super League, Yamil joined Pahang FA, replacing Bright Dike. He made his debut for Pahang in a 3–2 loss in the 2017 Malaysia FA Cup final in which he managed to assist one goal.

== Honours ==
=== Club ===
Pahang

- Malaysian FA Cup: Runners-up 2017
