= Emmanuel Oti =

Ghanaian footballer

Personal information
- Full name: Emmanuel Oti Essigba
- Date of birth: 24 September 1996 (age 30)
- Place of birth: Akim Oda, Ghana
- Height: 1.72 m (5 ft 8 in)
- Position: Winger

Senior career*
Years	Team	Apps	(Gls)
2013–2015	WAFA		
2015–2017	Braga B	27	(4)
2017–2019	Esbjerg fB	54	(1)
2020	Madura United	3	(0)
2020–2021	Vizela	0	(0)
2021–2022	Vegalta Sendai	7	(0)
2022	Melaka United	9	(4)
2023–2024	Anadia	3	(0)
- * Club domestic league appearances and goals as of 13 January 2024

Emmanuel Oti Essigba (born 24 September 1996) is a Ghanaian professional footballer who plays as a winger.

== International career ==
He represented the national under-17 team at the 2013 African U-17 Championship (and its qualifiers).
