= Saufi Muhammad =

Malaysian footballer

Personal information
- Full name: Mohd Saufi Bin Muhammad
- Date of birth: 11 July 1992 (age 34)
- Place of birth: Kuantan, Malaysia
- Height: 1.74 m (5 ft 8 1/2 in)
- Position: Goalkeeper

Team information
- Current team: Kelantan
- Number: 22

Youth career
- 2012—2015: Pahang President Cup

Senior career*
Years	Team	Apps	(Gls)
2016—2017	Pahang	1	(0)
2018	Shahzan Muda	0	(0)
2019–	Kelantan	0	(0)
- * Club domestic league appearances and goals as of 29 December 2018

Mohd Saufi Bin Muhammad (born 11 July 1992) is a Malaysian footballer who plays as a goalkeeper for Kelantan in the Malaysia Premier League.
