= Adriano (footballer, born August 1994) =

Brazilian footballer (born 1994)

Adriano Narcizo
Personal information
- Full name: Adriano Aparecido Narcizo
- Date of birth: 30 August 1994 (age 32)
- Place of birth: Ipaussu, Brazil
- Height: 1.75 m (5 ft 9 in)
- Position: Forward

Team information
- Current team: The Cong-Viettel
- Number: 27

Senior career*
Years	Team	Apps	(Gls)
2014–2015	Novorizontino	5	(0)
2015	Trindade	10	(0)
2017	Rio Branco	8	(0)
2018	Ipatinga	0	(0)
2019–2021	Galvez	19	(10)
2021–2022	Melaka United	15	(4)
2023–2024	Penang	23	(1)
2024	The Cong-Viettel	2	(0)
- * Club domestic league appearances and goals as of 9 March 2024

Adriano Aparecido Narcizo (born 30 August 1994), simply known as Adriano, is a Brazilian professional footballer who plays as a forward. He is currently a free agent after being sacked by his former club The Cong Viettel FC.

== Club career ==
=== Melaka United ===
On 27 May 2021, Adriano signed a contract with Malaysian club Melaka United. On 25 July 2021, he made his debut for the club in a 1–1 draw against Sri Pahang.

=== Penang FC ===
In February 2023, he joined Penang FC. He played as starting midfielder in a pre-season cup match against Selangor FC and won the Hope Cup.
