= Ifedayo Olusegun =

Nigerian footballer

Personal information
- Full name: Ifedayo Olusegun Patrick Omosouyi
- Date of birth: 14 January 1991 (age 35)
- Place of birth: Nigeria
- Height: 1.80 m (5 ft 11 in)
- Position: Forward

Team information
- Current team: Negeri Sembilan

Senior career*
Years	Team	Apps	(Gls)
2011	Rising Stars	56	(2)
2012–2014	Malkiya	9	(6)
2014–2017	Al-Hidd	24	(17)
2017	Felda United	8	(5)
2018	Al-Hidd		
2018	Melaka United	9	(8)
2019	Al-Riffa	20	(18)
2019–2021	Selangor	43	(50)
2022	Melaka United	19	(7)
2023	Kedah Darul Aman	13	(12)
2024–2025	PDRM	20	(9)
2025–2026	Kelantan TRW	8	(4)
2026–	Negeri Sembilan	0	(0)
- * Club domestic league appearances and goals

Ifedayo Olusegun Patrick Omosouyi (born 14 January 1991) is a professional footballer who plays as a forward for Malaysia Super League club Negeri Sembilan.

== Club career ==
=== Felda United ===
Omosuyi has also played in Bahrain for five years with Al-Hidd Club, making a strong impression before becoming a free agent. Omosuyi scored three minutes into his debut for the club in their 2–1 victory over Terengganu in a mid-week friendly. Omosuyi scored a hat-trick as they thrashed Shahzan Muda 5–2 over the weekend friendly match. On 1 July 2017, Omosuyi scored his first goal for the team during his league debut playing against Pahang. He was not disconcerted by the intimidating crowd for Felda's Malaysia Cup semi-final game versus Kedah.

=== Return to Al Hidd, and Melaka ===
After his contract was not renewed by Felda, he signed for his former club Al-Hidd for the 2018 season. But in June 2018, he returned to Malaysia to sign for Melaka United.

=== Selangor ===
In the middle of the 2019 season, Ifedayo signed for Malaysia Super League club Selangor.

King Dayo, is a nickname given to him by Red Giants Selangor fans after he positioned himself as the top scorer and golden boot winner 2 times 2020 season and 2021 season with 26 goals in a row also break records for the most valuable professional import player in Malaysian football history after the former teammates Rufino Segovia player was crowned top scorer of the 2018 season with 19 goals, adding the Best Foreign Player award, just five matches into the following campaign.

== Career statistics ==
=== Club ===
As of 23 August 2025

Club	Season	League			Cup		League Cup		Continental/Other		Total	
Club	Season	Division	Apps	Goals	Apps	Goals	Apps	Goals	Apps	Goals	Apps	Goals
Felda United	2017	Malaysia Super League	9	5	0	0	9	4	—		18	9
Felda United	Total		9	5	0	0	9	4	0	0	18	9
Melaka United	2018	Malaysia Super League	9	8	0	0	6	6	—		15	14
Melaka United	Total		9	8	0	0	6	6	0	0	15	14
Selangor	2019	Malaysia Super League	10	12	0	0	10	4	—		20	16
Selangor	2020	Malaysia Super League	11	12	—		1	1	—		12	13
Selangor	2021	Malaysia Super League	22	26	—		3	1	—		25	27
Selangor	Total		43	50	0	0	14	6	0	0	57	56
Melaka United	2022	Malaysia Super League	12	7	2	1	0	0	—		14	8
Melaka United	Total		12	7	2	1	0	0	0	0	14	8
Kedah Darul Aman	2023	Malaysia Super League	12	7	2	1	0	0	—		14	8
Kedah Darul Aman	Total		12	7	2	1	0	0	0	0	14	8
PDRM	2024–25	Malaysia Super League	18	8	0	0	2	1	5 (Note: Appearances in MFL Challenge Cup)	3	25	12
PDRM	Total		18	8	0	0	2	1	5	3	25	12
Kelantan TRW	2025–26	Malaysia Super League	3	1	1	2	0	0	0	0	4	3
Kelantan TRW	Total		3	1	1	2	0	0	0	0	4	3
Career total			73	70	2	1	29	16	0	0	114	87

== Honours ==
=== Club ===
Al-Hidd

- Bahraini Premier League: 2015–16
- Bahraini King's Cup: 2015
- Bahraini FA Cup: 2015
- Bahraini Super Cup: 2015

=== Individual ===
- PFAM Player of the Month (2): July 2018, May 2019
- Malaysia Super League Top Scorers (2): 2020, 2021
