= Fakhrullah Rosli =

Malaysian footballer

Personal information
- Full name: Mohamad Fakhrullah bin Rosli
- Date of birth: 8 January 1991 (age 35)
- Place of birth: Jasin, Malaysia
- Height: 1.76 m (5 ft 9 in)
- Position: Attacking midfielder

Team information
- Current team: MBMB Warriors
- Number: 14

Youth career
- –2009: Melaka United

Senior career*
Years	Team	Apps	(Gls)
2010–2013	Melaka United	33	(19)
2014–2015	DRB-Hicom	7	(1)
2017–2018	SAMB	20	(14)
2018	MOF	24	(13)
2019	Perlis	7	(3)
2019	SAMB	15	(7)
2020–2022	Melaka United	24	(2)
2023	Immigration	0	(0)
2023-2024	Melaka	0	(0)
2025-	MBMB Warriors	0	(0)
- * Club domestic league appearances and goals as of 26 March 2023

Mohamad Fakhrullah bin Rosli (born 8 January 1991) is a Malaysian professional footballer who plays as an attacking midfielder for Malaysia A2 Amateur League club MBMB Warriors
