= Faizal Talib =

Malaysian footballer

Personal information
- Full name: Muhammad Faizal bin Muhammad Talib
- Date of birth: 28 July 1997 (age 29)
- Place of birth: Negeri Sembilan, Malaysia
- Position: Winger

Team information
- Current team: MPPD
- Number: 13

Youth career
- –2018: Melaka United U21

Senior career*
Years	Team	Apps	(Gls)
2019–2022	Melaka United	10	(0)
2022	→ Penang (loan)	4	(0)
2023–2024	Kedah Darul Aman	0	(0)
2024	Kelantan Darul Naim	0	(0)
2024–2025	Melaka	0	(0)
2025	Machan	0	(0)
2026–	MPPD	0	(0)
- * Club domestic league appearances and goals as of 19 November 2026

Muhammad Faizal bin Muhammad Talib (born 28 July 1997) is a Malaysian footballer who plays as a winger for Malaysia A2 Amateur League club MPPD.

== Club career ==
=== Kedah Darul Aman ===
On 19 December 2022, Faizal signed a one-year contract with Malaysia Super League club Kedah Darul Aman.
