= Khairul Anwar Shahrudin =

Malaysian footballer (born 1990)

Personal information
- Full name: Khairul Anwar bin Shahrudin
- Date of birth: 9 October 1990 (age 36)
- Place of birth: Bentong, Pahang, Malaysia
- Height: 1.72 m (5 ft 7 1/2 in)
- Positions: Left-back; midfielder

Team information
- Current team: Melaka
- Number: 25

Youth career
- 2011: MP Muar

Senior career*
Years	Team	Apps	(Gls)
2012–2013	MP Muar	5	(0)
2013–2015	DRB-Hicom		
2015–2016	Sime Darby		
2016–2018	Negeri Sembilan	27	(2)
2019	Terengganu	8	(0)
2020–2022	Melaka United	19	(0)
2023–2024	Immigration		
2025–	Melaka		
- * Club domestic league appearances and goals as of 15 July 2025

Khairul Anwar bin Shahrudin (born 9 October 1990) is a Malaysian professional footballer who plays as left-back or midfielder for Melaka.

== Career ==
Born in Bentong, Pahang, Khairul Anwar began his football career playing for MP Muar U21 team in 2012 at the age of 21, before being promoted to the senior team. In 2014, Khairul Anwar played for DRB-Hicom and for Sime Darby in 2015.
