= 2020 Felda United F.C. season =

Felda United
2020 season
- President: Anuar Malek
- Manager: Jamaludin Ahmad
- Head coach: Nidzam Jamil
- Stadium: Tun Abdul Razak Stadium (Capacity: 25,000)
- Super League: 11th (relegated)
- FA Cup: Cancelled
- Malaysia Cup: Cancelled
- Top goalscorer: League: Nicolás Vélez; Khairul Amri (3 goals each); All: Nicolás Vélez; Khairul Amri (3 goals each)

The 2020 season was Felda United's 14th competitive season and 2nd season in the Malaysia Super League since the club's promotion to the Malaysia Super League after only a one-year absence, winning the Malaysia Premier League. The club's license from the Football Association of Malaysia (FAM) has been obtained to continue their tracks in the Malaysian Football League.

This season was club's final season before been dissolved.

== Players ==
=== First-team squad ===
Note: Flags indicate national team as defined under FIFA eligibility rules; some limited exceptions apply. Players may hold more than one non-FIFA nationality.

No.	Pos.	Nation	Player
1	GK	(Malaysia) MAS	Muhaimin Mohamad
2	DF	(Malaysia) MAS	Azarul Nazarith
3	DF	(Malaysia) MAS	Tasnim Fitri
4	MF	(Malaysia) MAS	Fadhil Idris
6	MF	(Malaysia) MAS	Faiz Mazlan
7	FW	(Gabon) GAB	Frédéric Bulot
9	MF	(Japan) JPN	Ryutaro Megumi
10	FW	(Argentina) ARG	Nicolás Vélez
12	MF	(Malaysia) MAS	Shahrul Aizad
13	FW	(Malaysia) MAS	Zul Fahmi Awang
16	MF	(Malaysia) MAS	Danial Amier
17	DF	(Malaysia) MAS	Azmizi Azmi
18	DF	(Malaysia) MAS	Jadid Alias
19	FW	(Singapore) SGP	Khairul Amri (vice-captain)

No.	Pos.	Nation	Player
20	DF	(Malaysia) MAS	Ezanie Salleh
21	MF	(Malaysia) MAS	Jasazrin Jamaludin (captain)
22	GK	(Malaysia) MAS	Zarif Irfan Hashimuddin
23	MF	(Malaysia) MAS	Akhmar Haiqal
24	GK	(Malaysia) MAS	Syah Fadil Jokori
27	DF	(Malaysia) MAS	Ariff Farhan Isa
28	GK	(Malaysia) MAS	Azrul Nizam
30	DF	(Malaysia) MAS	Haziq Puad
32	DF	(Malaysia) MAS	Osman Yusoff
33	DF	(Serbia) SRB	Nikola Raspopović (third-captain)
34	MF	(Malaysia) MAS	Naqib Najwan
36	DF	(Malaysia) MAS	Zainal Abidin Jamil
37	FW	(Malaysia) MAS	Norazwan Amir
77	FW	(Malaysia) MAS	Syahmi Zamri

=== Appearances and goals ===
Player	Position	Appearances	Goals	Profile
First-team squad
(Malaysia) Muhaimin Mohamad	GK	9	0	
(Malaysia) Azarul Nazarith	DF	11	0	
(Malaysia) Faiz Mazlan	MF	11	0	
(Gabon) Frédéric Bulot	FW	10	1	
(Japan) Ryutaro Megumi	MF	10	0	
(Argentina) Nicolás Vélez	FW	7	3	
(Singapore) Khairul Amri	FW	10	3	
(Malaysia) Ezanie Salleh	DF	4	0	
(Malaysia) Jasazrin Jamaludin	MF	9	0	
(Malaysia) Ariff Farhan Isa	DF	10	1	
(Malaysia) Haziq Puad	DF	5	0	
(Malaysia) Fadhil Idris	MF	10	0	
(Malaysia) Azmizi Azmi	DF	8	0	
(Malaysia) Akhmar Haiqal	DF	8	1	
(Serbia) Nikola Raspopović	DF	10	1	
(Malaysia) Shahrul Aizad	MF	2	0	
(Malaysia) Zarif Irfan Hashimuddin	GK	3	0	
(Malaysia) Tasnim Fitri	DF	4	0	
(Malaysia) Syahmi Zamri	FW	7	1	
(Malaysia) Danial Amier Norhisham	MF	6	1	
(Malaysia) Zul Fahmi Awang	FW	2	0	
(Malaysia) Haizal Jine Adam	FW	1	0	
(Malaysia) Osman Yusoff	DF	3	0	
(Malaysia) Jadid Ilias	DF	4	0	
(Malaysia) Norazwan Amir	FW	1	0	
(Malaysia) Naqib Najwan	MF	1	0	
Own goals			0	
Total goals			12	

== Competitions ==
=== Malaysia Super League ===
Pos	Team	Pld	W	D	L	GF	GA	GD	Pts	Qualification or relegation
8	Pahang	11	4	2	5	18	18	0	14	
9	Melaka United	11	4	2	5	13	16	−3	11 (Note: Melaka have been docked three points following the decision from FAM.)	
10	Sabah	11	2	3	6	12	24	−12	9	
11	Felda United (R)	11	1	4	6	12	27	−15	7	Relegation to Malaysia Premier League
12	PDRM (R)	11	0	2	9	5	29	−24	−1 (Note: PDRM have been docked three points following the decision from FAM.)	Relegation to Malaysia Premier League

Source: Malaysian Football League
Rules for classification: 1) Points; 2) Goal difference; 3) Number of goals scored.
(R) Relegated
