= 2019 Felda United F.C. season =

Felda United
2019 season
- President: Anuar Malek
- Manager: Jamaludin Ahmad
- Head coach: Nidzam Jamil
- Stadium: Tun Abdul Razak Stadium (Capacity: 25,000)
- Super League: 10th
- FA Cup: Semi-finals
- Malaysia Cup: Group stage
- Top goalscorer: League: Kei Ikeda (6 goals); All: Khairul Amri (7 goals)

The 2019 season was Felda United's 13th competitive season and 1st season in the Malaysia Super League since the club's promotion to the Malaysia Super League after only a one-year absence, winning the Malaysia Premier League. The club's license from the Football Association of Malaysia (FAM) has been obtained to continue their tracks in the Malaysian Football League.

== Background ==
In 2018, Felda United won the Premier League on their first season in the league. They played in the second-tier division due to complications in obtaining the club's license to play in the Super League in 2019. The team huddled through the season until they became champion in the guidance of then head coach, B. Sathianathan and then captain, Shukor Adan.

In the Malaysia FA Cup, Felda United was up against PKNP in the quarter-finals. The team managed to score 1–0 in their first leg during the away match. Sadly, PKNP bust the team with a score of 1–2 in the second leg, leaving PKNP with the upper hand to continue in the semi-finals.

Meanwhile, in the Malaysia Cup, Felda United was grouped with 3 other competitive clubs which were the PDRM, Melaka United and PKNP in Group B. Felda United managed to place second in the group with 10 points, after PKNS being placed first with 13 points. The team however failed to qualify into semifinals as they got dunked by Terengganu, with defeats in both first leg and second leg with a score of 1–2 and 3–4. The aggregate sides Terengganu with a 4–6 victory.

However, throughout the end of 2018, Felda United was bummed with financial issues, the players and the coaches weren't paid for 3 months since the 2018 Malaysian Election. The situation was a blur and Felda United had to drop their key players and change all four of their previous import players including Thiago Fernandes due to budget cut in order to face the Super League in 2019. This season, the club will be represented by young, fresh and talented players but lacking of experience to play in the top flight, as mentioned by Christie Jayaseelan.

Despite the disappointing ending for the 2018 season, the club signed three new import players and retained one of Felda United's Brazilian import player, Thiago Junio. Thiago Junio played very well in the previous season and he is back to be Felda United's shield. Besides Thiago, the club introduced three import players which are Jaycee John from Bahrain, Kei Ikeda from Japan and another Brazil-born player, Jocinei.

== Friendlies ==
=== Friendlies ===
29 December 2018 1	Felda United	2–1	Petaling Jaya Rangers	Bangi
20:45 UTC+8				Stadium: Padang Institut Semarak Felda

5 January 2019 2	Felda United	1–2	MIFA	Bangi
21:00 UTC+8				Stadium: Padang Institut Semarak Felda

12 January 2019 3	Felda United	0–1	PKNP	Bangi
21:00 UTC+8				Stadium: Padang Institut Semarak Felda

19 January 2019 4	Felda United	3–1	(Singapore) Home United	Bangi
21:00 UTC+8				Stadium: Padang Institut Semarak Felda

22 January 2019 5	Felda United	0–0	Terengganu II	Putrajaya
16:45 UTC+8				Stadium: Putrajaya Equestrian Park

26 January 2019 6	Felda United	2–0	Kuching	Kuala Lumpur
21:00 UTC+8				Stadium: UM Arena Stadium

== Competitions ==
=== Malaysia Super League ===
==== League table ====
Pos	Team	Pld	W	D	L	GF	GA	GD	Pts	Qualification or relegation
8	Petaling Jaya City	22	8	2	12	22	29	−7	26	
9	PKNS (Note: PKNS F.C. relegated after withdrawing license to complete for the 2020 Malaysia Premier League season as they become feeder club to Selangor FA.) (R)	22	5	6	11	37	38	−1	21	Relegation to Malaysia Premier League
10	Felda United	22	4	7	11	27	43	−16	19	
11	PKNP (R)	22	3	7	12	22	40	−18	16	Relegation to Malaysia Premier League
12	Kuala Lumpur (R)	22	4	2	16	24	49	−25	14	Relegation to Malaysia Premier League

Source: MFL
Rules for classification: 1) Points; 2) Goal difference; 3) Number of goals scored.
(R) Relegated

==== Fixtures and results ====
Win Draw Loss

3 February 2019 1	Selangor	1–1	Felda United	Shah Alam
21:00 UTC+8	German 41'	Report	Sadam (yellow card) 25'; Haziq (yellow card) 47'; Hadin 70', (yellow card) 81'	Stadium: Shah Alam Stadium; Referee: Suhaizi Shukri

10 February 2019 2	Felda United	1–1	PKNP	Jengka
21:00 UTC+8	Hadin 68'	Report	Abbey 36'	Stadium: Tun Abdul Razak Stadium; Referee: Fitri Maskon

16 February 2019 3	Kedah	4–0	Felda United	Alor Setar
21:00 UTC+8	Zaquan 17'; Almubaraki 42'; Shakir 54'; Danel 74'	Report	Haziq (yellow card) 72'	Stadium: Darul Aman Stadium; Referee: Mohd Hasrol Mohd Amir

23 February 2019 4	Perak	1–1	Felda United	Ipoh
21:00 UTC+8	Gilmar 71' (pen.), (yellow card) 88'	Report	Hadin 44'; Watanabe (yellow card) 45+1'; Haziq (yellow card) 75'; Jasazrin (yellow card) 89'; Norazlan (yellow card) 90+2'	Stadium: Perak Stadium; Referee: Fusser Mad Sallih

2 March 2019 5	Felda United	1–0	Petaling Jaya City	Jengka
21:00 UTC+8	Ikeda 30' (pen.)	Report	Serginho (yellow card) 11'; Thivandran (yellow card) 63'	Stadium: Tun Abdul Razak Stadium; Referee: Khairul Azuan Kidam

9 March 2019 6	PKNS	2–0	Felda United	Shah Alam
21:00 UTC+8	Morales 24'; Kozubaev 47'	Report	Watanabe (yellow card) 45+3'; Raffi (yellow card) 65'	Stadium: Shah Alam Stadium; Referee: Mohd Nafeez Abdul Wahab

30 March 2019 7	Felda United	1–3	Pahang	Jengka
21:00 UTC+8	Watanabe (yellow card) 40'; Thiago Junio 49'	Report	Norshahrul 45+1'; Zé Love 64' (pen.); Faisal 90+2'	Stadium: Tun Abdul Razak Stadium; Attendance: 15,877; Referee: Suhaizi Shukri

5 April 2019 8	Johor Darul Ta'zim	3–1	Felda United	Johor Bahru
21:00 UTC+8	Adam (yellow card) 70'; Cabrera 88'; Akhyar 90+3'; Diogo 90+10'	Report	Zahril (yellow card) 29' (yellow-red card) 61'; Thiago Junio (yellow card) 42' (yellow-red card) 85'; Jasazrin (yellow card) 65'; Hadin (yellow card) 75' (yellow-red card) 89'	Stadium: Larkin Stadium; Referee: Fitri Maskon

13 April 2019 9	Felda United	1–1	Kuala Lumpur	Jengka
21:00 UTC+8	Azim 34'	Report	Indra Putra 57'; Ashri (yellow card) 69'	Stadium: Tun Abdul Razak Stadium; Referee: Mohd Nafeez Abdul Wahab

19 April 2019 10	Terengganu	2–1	Felda United	Kuala Terengganu
21:00 UTC+8	Thierry (yellow card) 24'; Khairu (yellow card) 45+1'; Tchétché 50', 90', (yellow card) 54'	Report	Haziq (yellow card) 40'; Watanabe 90+4'	Stadium: Sultan Mizan Zainal Abidin Stadium; Referee: Mohd Hasrol Mohd Amir

26 April 2019 11	Felda United	1–1	Melaka United	Jengka
21:00 UTC+8	Ikeda 62' (pen.), (yellow card) 90'; Watanabe (yellow card) 77'	Report	Reichelt 15'; Faris (yellow card) 28'; Marković (yellow card) 48'; Shukor (yellow card) 60'; Jang Suk-won (yellow card) 61'	Stadium: Tun Abdul Razak Stadium; Referee: Razlan Joffri Ali

4 May 2019 12	Felda United	0–2	Johor Darul Ta'zim	Jengka
21:00 UTC+8	Thiago Junio (yellow card) 37'; Chanturu (yellow card) 71'; Ikeda (yellow card) 75'; Haziq (yellow card) 81'; Jocinei (yellow card) 90+3'	Report	Velázquez (yellow card) 8'; Diogo (yellow card) 28', (goal) 38' (pen.), 62'; Safawi (yellow card) 74'; Corbin-Ong (yellow card) 75'; Syamer (yellow card) 87'	Stadium: Tun Abdul Razak Stadium; Referee: Wan Mohamad Tarmizi Wan Ibrahim

15 May 2019 13	Melaka United	6–0	Felda United	Krubong
22:00 UTC+8	Reichelt 5'; Safiq 25', (yellow card) 33'; Milunović 36', 53', 89'; Nazrin 36'; Raimi (yellow card) 67'; Afiq (yellow card) 68'	Report	Azim (yellow card) 67'; Chanturu (yellow card) 68'; Zahril (yellow card) 68'; Christie (yellow card) 78'; Thiago Junio (yellow card) 88'	Stadium: Hang Jebat Stadium; Referee: Mat Zan Abdul Wahab

18 May 2019 14	Felda United	1–1	Terengganu	Jengka
22:00 UTC+8	Ikeda 88'	Report	Khairul (yellow card) 68'; Nabil 83'	Stadium: Tun Abdul Razak Stadium; Referee: Zamzaidi Katimin

26 May 2019 15 ^{P}	Pahang	3–1	Felda United	Kuantan
21:00 UTC+8	Kaimbi 14'; Goulon 72'; Nwakaeme 87'	Report	Chanturu 28'; Thiago Junio (yellow card) 75'	Stadium: Darul Makmur Stadium; Referee: Khirulazuan Kidam

14 June 2019 16	Felda United	5–4	PKNS	Jengka
22:00 UTC+8	Thiago Junio 4'; Hadin 45'; Jasazrin (yellow card) 45+4'; Faiz 48'; Khairul Amri 52', 56'; Norazlan (yellow card) 88'	Report	Kannan (yellow card) 10'; Sherman 15'; Kozubaev 60'; Jafri 72'; Rodney 82'	Stadium: Tun Abdul Razak Stadium; Referee: Hamdan Awang

18 June 2019 17	Petaling Jaya City	1–0	Felda United	Bukit Jalil
21:00 UTC+8	Aizulridzwan (yellow card) 10'; Safee 45+1'; Serginho (yellow card) 51'	Report	Khairul Amri (yellow card) 22'; Thiago Junio (yellow card) 49'; Watanabe (yellow card) 51'	Stadium: National Stadium; Referee: Mohd Zohri Tajuddin

25 June 2019 18	Felda United	2–3	Perak	Jengka
21:00 UTC+8	Haziq (yellow card) 39'; Hadin 81'; Kei Ikeda 83'; Jasazrin (yellow card) 85'	Report	Ronaldo 22'; Kenny (yellow card) 27'; Partiban 34'; Hakim (yellow card) 39'; Careca 53', (yellow card) 90'	Stadium: Tun Abdul Razak Stadium; Referee: Hamdan Awang

7 July 2019 19	Felda United	1–2	Selangor	Jengka
21:00 UTC+8	Jocinei 64'; Watanabe (yellow card) 70'	Report	Nguyễn (yellow card) 23'; Sandro 44'; Ifedayo 51'	Stadium: Tun Abdul Razak Stadium; Referee: Majed Mohammed H Alshamrani

10 July 2019 20	Kuala Lumpur	0–2	Felda United	Cheras
21:00 UTC+8	Noh Haeng-seok (yellow card) 77'; Alif (yellow card) 81'; Firdaus (yellow card) 90+1'; Fitri (yellow card) 90+4'	Report	Khairul Amri 41'; Zahril 64'; Ikeda (yellow card) 73'; Christie (yellow card) 88'	Stadium: Kuala Lumpur Stadium; Referee: Nazmi Nasaruddin

13 July 2019 21	PKNP	1–1	Felda United	Manjung
21:00 UTC+8	Nazirul (yellow card) 55'; Pinto 81'	Report	Chanturu (yellow card) 13', (goal) 53'; Christie (yellow card) 66'	Stadium: Manjung Municipal Council Stadium; Referee: Fusser Sallih

21 July 2019 22	Felda United	5–1	Kedah	Jengka
22:00 UTC+8	Jocinei 6'; Jadid (yellow card) 21'; Faiz 32'; Jasazrin (yellow card) 45+2', (goal) 90+2'; Khairul Amri 85', (yellow card) 85'; Thiago Junio (yellow card) 86'; Ikeda 90+3'		Farhan (yellow card) 11'; Renan (yellow card) 36' (yellow-red card) 74'; Bauman 78' (pen.)	Stadium: Tun Abdul Razak Stadium; Referee: S. Logeswaran

=== Malaysia FA Cup ===
2 April 2019 Second round	Kuching	0–1	Felda United	Kuching
21:00 UTC+8		Report	Chanturu 90+5'	Stadium: Sarawak State Stadium; Referee: S. Logeswaran

16 April 2019 Third round	Selangor	1–2	Felda United	Shah Alam
21:00 UTC+8	Syahmi 56'; Halim (yellow card) 72'	Report	Chanturu (yellow card) 53'; Thiago Junio 65'; Haziq (yellow card) 79'; Hadin 89'	Stadium: Shah Alam Stadium; Referee: Mat Zan Abdul Wahab

30 April 2019 Quarter-finals 1st leg	Kuala Lumpur	3–3	Felda United	Cheras
21:00 UTC+8	Indra Putra 41', 54'; Paulo Josué 80'; Hisyamudin (yellow card) 87'	Report	Azim 23', 60'; Watanabe (yellow card) 45'; Thiago Junio (yellow card) 58'; Jocinei 75'	Stadium: Kuala Lumpur Stadium; Referee: Mohd Nafeez Abdul Wahab

11 May 2019 Quarter-finals 2nd leg	Felda United	0–0 (3–3 agg.)	Kuala Lumpur	Jengka
22:00 UTC+8	Watanabe (yellow card) 59'; Azim (yellow card) 81'; Thiago Junio (yellow card) 85'	Report	Paulo Josué (yellow card) 14'; Karube (yellow card) 81'; Irfan (yellow card) 85'	Stadium: Tun Abdul Razak Stadium; Referee: Suhaimi Mat Hassan

22 June 2019 Semi-finals 1st leg	Kedah	1–0	Felda United	Alor Setar
21:00 UTC+8	Fernando 70' (pen.)	Report	Zahril (yellow card) 41'; Norazlan (yellow card) 51'; Jasazrin (yellow card) 84'	Stadium: Darul Aman Stadium; Referee: Suhaimi Mat Hassan

30 June 2019 Semi-finals 2nd leg	Felda United	3–2 (3–3 agg.)	Kedah	Jengka
21:00 UTC+8	Thiago Junio 65'; Chanturu 72'; Hadin 90+4'	Report	Fernando 26' (pen.); Farhan 38'; Rowley (yellow card) 72'	Stadium: Tun Abdul Razak Stadium; Referee: Zamzaidi Katimin

=== Malaysia Cup ===
==== Group stage ====
Pos	Team	Pld	W	D	L	GF	GA	GD	Pts	Qualification
1	Selangor	6	2	4	0	9	6	+3	10	Advance to knockout stage
2	Melaka United	6	2	2	2	10	9	+1	8	Advance to knockout stage
3	FELDA United	6	2	1	3	10	12	−2	7	
4	PDRM	6	1	3	2	10	12	−2	6	

Source: FAM MFL

3 August 2019 1	Selangor	2–2	Felda United	Shah Alam
21:00 UTC+8	Syazwan 34'; Ifedayo 40'	Report	Christie 42'; Khairul Amri 86' (pen.)	Stadium: Shah Alam Stadium; Referee: Muhammad Nazmi Nasaruddin

7 August 2019 2	PDRM	4–3	Felda United	Krubong
21:00 UTC+8	Wleh 37'; Farid (yellow card) 54'; Shahurain (yellow card) 65'; Gopinathan 78', 88'; Azmizi 90+5'	Report	Chanturu 9'; Khairul Amri 18', 56'	Stadium: Hang Jebat Stadium; Referee: Tuan Mohd Yaasin Tuan Mohd Hanafiah

== Squad information ==
As of 11 January 2019

No.	Name	Nat	Date of birth (age)	Since	Previous club
Goalkeepers
1	Azri Ghani	(Malaysia)	30 April 1999 (age 26)	2018	Youth system
20	Norazlan Razali	(Malaysia)	19 December 1985 (age 40)	2019	Selangor
24	Syah Fadil Jokori	(Malaysia)	1 January 1995 (age 31)	2019	Young Fighters
Defenders
2	Arif Fadzilah	(Malaysia)	20 April 1997 (age 28)	2019	Terengganu II
3	Tasnim Fitri	(Malaysia)	19 January 1999 (age 27)	2018	Youth system
4	Raffi Nagoorgani	(Malaysia)	17 June 1994 (age 31)	2019	PKNP
5	Ali Imran Alimi	(Malaysia)	2 February 1998 (age 28)	2017	Youth system
6	Faiz Mazlan	(Malaysia)	20 January 1997 (age 29)	2019	Youth system
13	Masaki Watanabe	(Japan)	2 December 1986 (age 39)	2019	Perlis
15	Azarul Nazarith	(Malaysia)	2 July 1998 (age 27)	2019	Youth system
17	Zulhelmi Asyraf	(Malaysia)		2019	Young Fighters
18	Jadid Ilias	(Malaysia)	21 December 1996 (age 29)	2019	Sultan Idris Education University
25	Anwar Ibrahim	(Malaysia)	10 June 1999 (age 26)	2018	Youth system
26	Thiago Junio	(Brazil)	3 April 1984 (age 41)	2018	Perak
30	Haziq Puad	(Malaysia)	26 May 1993 (age 32)	2019	Kelantan
Midfielders
7	Aizat Mukhlis Yazir	(Malaysia)	15 August 1997 (age 28)	2019	Youth system
8	Jocinei	(Brazil)	4 February 1990 (age 35)	2019	Criciúma
10	Kei Ikeda	(Japan)	20 October 1986 (age 39)	2019	Sagan Tosu
11	Zahril Azri	(Malaysia)	4 February 1999 (age 26)	2018	Youth system
16	Danial Amier	(Malaysia)	27 March 1997 (age 28)	2017	Youth system
19	Christie Jayaseelan	(Malaysia)	18 August 1986 (age 39)	2018	Pahang
21	Jasazrin Jamaluddin	(Malaysia)	3 April 1986 (age 39)	2019	Penang
23	Chanturu Suppiah	(Malaysia)	14 December 1987 (age 38)	2019	Melaka United
27	Hadin Azman (C)	(Malaysia)	2 July 1994 (age 31)	2015	Johor Darul Ta'zim
29	Nasril Izzat	(Malaysia)	15 April 1990 (age 35)	2019	PDRM
Forwards
9	Khairul Amri	(Singapore)	14 March 1985 (age 40)	2019	Tampines Rovers
12	Azim Rahim	(Malaysia)	1 January 1997 (age 29)	2019	Felcra
14	Sadam Hashim	(Malaysia)	11 August 1992 (age 33)	2019	UiTM

== Club statistics ==
=== Appearances and goals ===
As of 7 August 2019

No.	Pos.	Name	League		FA Cup		Malaysia Cup		Total		Discipline	
No.	Pos.	Name	Apps	Goals	Apps	Goals	Apps	Goals	Apps	Goals	Yellow card	Red card
1	GK	(Malaysia) Azri Ghani	0	0	0	0	0	0	0	0		
2	DF	(Malaysia) Arif Fadzilah	15	0	2	0	0	0	17	0		
3	DF	(Malaysia) Tasnim Fitri	4(1)	0	3	0	2	0	9(1)	0		
4	DF	(Malaysia) Raffi Nagoorgani	15	0	2(2)	0	2	0	19(1)	0	2	
5	DF	(Malaysia) Ali Imran	0(2)	0	0	0	0	0	0(2)	0		
6	DF	(Malaysia) Faiz Mazlan	7(8)	2	3(1)	0	0(2)	0	10(10)	2		
7	MF	(Malaysia) Aizat Mukhlis	0	0	0	0	0	0	0	0		
8	MF	(Brazil) Jocinei	17(4)	3	5	1	2	0	23(4)	4	1	
10	MF	(Japan) Kei Ikeda	12(9)	6	5(1)	0	0	0	17(10)	6	3	
11	MF	(Malaysia) Zahril Azri	12(3)	1	2(2)	0	0(1)	0	13(6)	1	4	1
12	FW	(Malaysia) Azim Rahim	9(4)	1	2(2)	2	0	0	11(6)	3	2	
13	DF	(Japan) Masaki Watanabe	12	0	5	0	0	0	16	0	8	
14	MF	(Malaysia) Sadam Hashim	4(8)	0	1(2)	0	0	0	5(10)	0	1	
15	DF	(Malaysia) Azarul Nazarith	0	0	0	0	0	0	0	0		
16	MF	(Malaysia) Danial Amier	2(2)	0	0(1)	0	2	0	4(3)	0		
17	DF	(Malaysia) Zulhelmi Asyraf	0	0	0	0	0	0	0	0		
18	DF	(Malaysia) Jadid Ilias	6(1)	0	1	0	2	0	9(1)	0	2	
19	MF	(Malaysia) Christie Jayaseelan	11(5)	0	3	0	2	1	16(5)	1	2	
20	GK	(Malaysia) Norazlan Razali	22	0	6	0	2	0	30	0	2	
21	MF	(Malaysia) Jasazrin Jamaluddin	19(1)	1	4	0	2	0	25(1)	1	6	
22	FW	(Singapore) Khairul Amri	6(1)	4	1	0	2	3	9(1)	7	2	
23	FW	(Malaysia) Chanturu Suppiah	17(2)	2	5(1)	2	2	1	25(3)	4	3	
24	GK	(Malaysia) Syah Fadil Jokori	0	0	0	0	0	0	0	0		
25	DF	(Malaysia) Anwar Ibrahim	9(3)	0	4(1)	0	0	0	13(4)	0		
26	DF	(Brazil) Thiago Junio	17	2	4(1)	2	2	0	22(1)	4	8	1
27	MF	(Malaysia) Hadin Azman	12(1)	5	3(1)	2	0(2)	0	15(4)	6	2	1
29	MF	(Malaysia) Nasril Izzat	0	0	0	0	0	0	0	0		
30	DF	(Malaysia) Haziq Puad	11(4)	0	4	0	0	0	15(4)	0	7	
33	FW	(Malaysia) Syahmi Zamri	0(2)	0	0(2)	0	0	0	0(4)	0	0	
Players who left the club during season
9	FW	(Brazil) Thiago Quirino	1	0	1	0	0	0	2	0		
22	FW	(Bahrain) Jaycee John	2	0	0	0	0	0	2	0		

== Transfers and contracts ==
=== In ===
First leg

No.	Pos.	Name	Age	Transferred from
2	DF	(Malaysia) Arif Fadzilah	28	(Malaysia) Terengganu II
4	DF	(Malaysia) Raffi Nagoorgani	31	(Malaysia) PKNP
6	MF	(Malaysia) Faiz Mazlan	29	Youth system
7	MF	(Malaysia) Aizat Mukhlis	28	Youth system
8	MF	(Brazil) Jocinei	35	(Brazil) Criciúma
9	FW	(Brazil) Thiago Quirino	41	(Japan) Kagoshima United
10	MF	(Japan) Kei Ikeda	39	(Japan) Sagan Tosu
12	FW	(Malaysia) Azim Rahim	29	(Malaysia) Felcra
13	DF	(Japan) Masaki Watanabe	39	(Malaysia) Perlis
14	MF	(Malaysia) Sadam Hashim	33	(Malaysia) UITM
15	DF	(Malaysia) Azarul Nazarith	27	Youth system
17	DF	(Malaysia) Zulhelmi Asyraf		(Malaysia) Young Fighters
18	DF	(Malaysia) Jadid Ilias	29	(Malaysia) Sultan Idris Education University
20	GK	(Malaysia) Norazlan Razali	40	(Malaysia) Selangor
21	MF	(Malaysia) Jasazrin Jamaluddin	39	(Malaysia) Penang
22	FW	(Bahrain) Jaycee John	40	(Thailand) Bangkok United
23	FW	(Malaysia) Chanturu Suppiah	38	(Malaysia) Melaka United
24	GK	(Malaysia) Syah Fadil	31	(Malaysia) Young Fighters
29	MF	(Malaysia) Nasril Izzat	35	(Malaysia) PDRM
30	DF	(Malaysia) Haziq Puad	32	(Malaysia) Kelantan

Second leg

No.	Pos.	Name	Age	Transferred from
9	FW	(Singapore) Khairul Amri	40	(Singapore) Tampines Rovers

=== Out ===
First leg

No.	Pos.	Name	Age	Transferred to
1	GK	(Malaysia) Kalamullah Al-Hafiz	30	(Malaysia) Petaling Jaya City
3	DF	(Malaysia) Fazly Alias	44	
8	MF	(Malaysia) Khairu Azrin	34	(Malaysia) Terengganu
9	FW	(Brazil) Thiago Fernandes	35	(Bahrain) Manama
10	FW	(Brazil) Gilberto Fortunato	38	(Bolivia) Sport Boys Warnes
11	MF	(Malaysia) Wan Zack Haikal	35	(Malaysia) Selangor
12	DF	(Malaysia) Shukor Adan	46	(Malaysia) Melaka United
13	MF	(Malaysia) Syamim Yahya	35	(Malaysia) Terengganu
14	DF	(Malaysia) Azreen Zulkafali	34	(Malaysia) Selangor
16	MF	(Malaysia) Stuart Wark	36	(Malaysia) Penang
17	MF	(Philippines) Iain Ramsay	37	(Thailand) Sukhothai
18	DF	(Malaysia) Irwan Fadzli Idrus	44	
20	DF	(Malaysia) Wan Amirul Afiq	33	(Malaysia) Melaka United
21	DF	(Malaysia) Prabakaran Kanadasan	34	(Malaysia) Selangor
23	DF	(Malaysia) Safwan Hashim	32	
28	DF	(Malaysia) Alif Yusof	35	(Malaysia) Kedah
30	GK	(Malaysia) Farizal Harun	40	(Malaysia) Selangor

Second leg

No.	Pos.	Name	Age	Transferred to
9	FW	(Brazil) Thiago Quirino	41	Unattached
22	FW	(Bahrain) Jaycee John	40	(Thailand) Bangkok United
