= 2021 Sri Pahang FC season =

16th season in the Malaysian Super League

Sri Pahang
2021 season
- CEO: Suffian Awang
- Head coach: Thomas Dooley (until 13 March 2021); Dollah Salleh (from 13 March 2021)
- Stadium: Darul Makmur Stadium
- Malaysia Super League: 10th
- Malaysia Cup: Group stage
- Top goalscorer: League: Kenny Athiu (4); All: Kenny Athiu (8)
- Highest home attendance: 0
- Lowest home attendance: 0
- Average home league attendance: 0
Home colours	Away colours	Third colours

The 2021 season was Sri Pahang FC's 18th season in the Malaysian Super League since its inception in 2004.

== Management team ==
Position	Nat.	Name
Team advisor	(United States)	Thomas Dooley
Team manager	(Malaysia)	Che Nasir Salleh
Head coach	(Malaysia)	Dollah Salleh
Assistant head coach	(Malaysia)	Ahmad Yusof
Assistant coaches	(Malaysia)	Shaharuddin Rosdi
Assistant coaches	(Malaysia)	Shahrulnizam Sahat
Goalkeeper coach	(Malaysia)	Ab Samad Mat Salleh
Fitness coaches	(Malaysia)	Mohd Hafiz Tajuddin
Team doctor	(Malaysia)	Shah Rezal Sujit
Physiotherapist	(Malaysia)	Adam Zuhairy Zafri
Masseur	(Malaysia)	Mohd Suhaimi Ramli
Security officer	(Malaysia)	Muhammaf Keny Anyie
Kit man	(Malaysia)	Abdul Razak B Akil
Kit man	(Malaysia)	Suffian Sulaiman

== Squad ==
As of 2 January 2021.

No.	Name	Nat.	Date of birth (age)	Previous club
Goalkeepers
1	Helmi Eliza	(Malaysia)	20 January 1983 (age 43)	(Malaysia) Negeri Sembilan
18	Daniel Wafiuddin	(Malaysia)	16 March 1997 (age 29)	(Malaysia) UKM
31	Zarif Irfan	(Malaysia)	21 February 1995 (age 31)	(Malaysia) Felda United
Defenders
2	Ezanie Salleh	(Malaysia)	18 April 1995 (age 30)	(Malaysia) Felda United
3	Hérold Goulon (vice-captain)	(France)	12 June 1988 (age 37)	(Cyprus) Ermis Aradippou
4	Nicholas Swirad	(Malaysia) (England)	28 May 1991 (age 34)	(Thailand) Nongbua Pitchaya
5	Jadid Ilias	(Malaysia)	21 December 1996 (age 29)	(Malaysia) Felda United
13	Ashar Al Aafiz	(Malaysia)	28 March 1995 (age 31)	Youth team
22	Fazly Mazlan	(Malaysia)	22 December 1993 (age 32)	(Malaysia) Johor Darul Ta'zim II
24	Muslim Ahmad (captain)	(Malaysia)	25 April 1989 (age 36)	(Malaysia) Kelantan
29	Faisal Rosli	(Malaysia)	21 January 1991 (age 35)	(Malaysia) Shahzan Muda
33	Hasnul Zaim	(Malaysia)	1 January 1999 (age 27)	Youth team
Midfielders
8	Yakubu Abubakar (3rd captain)	(Ghana)	9 February 1990 (age 36)	(Myanmar) Shan United
11	Shahrul Aizad	(Malaysia)	26 March 1993 (age 33)	(Malaysia) Terengganu
12	Baqiuddin Shamsudin	(Malaysia)	14 December 1994 (age 31)	(Malaysia) UKM
16	Hazri Rozali	(Malaysia)	26 June 1986 (age 39)	(Malaysia) Melaka United
17	Zuhair Aizat	(Malaysia)	1 October 1996 (age 29)	Youth team
19	Sharul Nizam	(Malaysia)	15 June 1996 (age 29)	Youth team
20	Azam Azih	(Malaysia)	3 January 1995 (age 31)	(Malaysia) Harimau Muda B
25	Hafiz Ramdan	(Malaysia)	28 June 1993 (age 32)	(Malaysia) Perak
27	Arisazri Juhari	(Malaysia)	14 February 1998 (age 28)	Youth team
88	Manuel Hidalgo	(Argentina)	3 May 1999 (age 26)	(England) Sheffield Wednesday
Forwards
6	Malik Ariff	(Malaysia)	7 January 1991 (age 35)	(Malaysia) Terengganu
9	Kenny Athiu	(Australia) (South Sudan)	5 August 1992 (age 33)	(Australia) Melbourne Victory
14	Aung Kaung Mann	(Myanmar)	18 February 1998 (age 28)	(Thailand) Khon Kaen United
21	Faizal Rani	(Malaysia)	17 January 1994 (age 32)	Youth team
23	Nur Izzat Che Awang	(Malaysia)	2 January 1998 (age 28)	Youth team
Players loaned out / left during season
10	Ezequiel Agüero	(Argentina)	7 April 1992 (age 34)	(Malaysia) Kuala Lumpur Rovers
4	Mamadou Wague	(Lebanon) (France)	19 August 1990 (age 35)	(Cyprus) Alki Oroklini
7	Lee Tuck	(England)	30 June 1988 (age 37)	(Malaysia) Terengganu
9	Pedro Henrique	(Timor-Leste) (Brazil)	17 January 1992 (age 34)	(Bangladesh) Sheikh Russel
10	Yevhen Bokhashvili	(Ukraine)	5 January 1993 (age 33)	(Indonesia) PSS Sleman

== Transfers ==
=== Transfers in ===
Pre-season

No.	Position	Player	Transferred from	Ref
31	GK	(Malaysia) Zarif Irfan	(Malaysia) Felda United	
2	DF	(Malaysia) Ezanie Salleh	(Malaysia) Felda United	
7	MF	(England) Lee Tuck	(Malaysia) Sri Pahang	
10	FW	(Argentina) Ezequiel Agüero	(Malaysia) Kuala Lumpur Rovers	
25	MF	(Malaysia) Hafiz Ramdan	(Malaysia) Perak	
12	MF	(Malaysia) Baqiuddin Shamsudin	(Malaysia) UKM	
11	MF	(Malaysia) Shahrul Aizad	Unattached	
6	FW	(Malaysia) Malik Ariff	Unattached	
5	DF	(Malaysia) Jadid Ilias	(Malaysia) Felda United	
4	DF	(Lebanon) (France) Mamadou Wagué	(Cyprus) Alki Oroklini	
10	FW	(Ukraine) Yevhen Bokhashvili	(Indonesia) PSS Sleman	
9	FW	(Timor-Leste) (Brazil) Pedro Henrique	(Bangladesh) Sheikh Russel	

Mid-season

No.	Position	Player	Transferred from	Ref
4	DF	(Malaysia) (England) Nicholas Swirad	(Thailand) Nongbua Pitchaya	6 months contract
8	MF	(Ghana) Yakubu Abubakar	(Myanmar) Shan United	
88	MF	(Argentina) Manuel Hidalgo	(England) Sheffield Wednesday	
14	FW	(Myanmar) Aung Kaung Mann	(Myanmar) Ayeyawady United	Season loan
9	FW	(Australia) (South Sudan) Kenny Athiu	Unattached	

=== Transfers out ===
Pre-season

No.	Position	Player	Transferred to	Ref
	GK	(Malaysia) Sharbinee Allawee	(Malaysia) Sarawak United	
	DF	(Malaysia) Bunyamin Umar	Unattached	
	DF	(Malaysia) Fazly Mazlan	(Malaysia) Johor Darul Ta'zim II	Loan return
	DF	(Lebanon) Khalil Khamis	(Lebanon) Ahed	Loan return
	DF	(Malaysia) Dinesh Rajasingam	(Malaysia) Selangor	Free
	MF	(Malaysia) Nik Sharif Haseefy	(Malaysia) Selangor	Free
	MF	(Malaysia) Faisal Halim	(Malaysia) Terengganu	
	MF	(England) (Philippines) Adam Reed	(Malaysia) UiTM	Free
	FW	(Nigeria) Dickson Nwakaeme	Unattached	
	FW	(Brazil) Ivan Carlos	(Indonesia) Persela Lamongan	
	FW	(Malaysia) S.Kumaahran	(Malaysia) Johor Darul Ta'zim II	Loan return
	FW	(Malaysia) Gopi Rizqi	(Malaysia) Sarawak United	Free
	FW	(Argentina) Ezequiel Agüero	(Malaysia) Selangor II	Season loan

Mid-season

No.	Position	Player	Transferred to	Ref
	DF	(Lebanon) (France) Mamadou Wague		
	MF	(England) Lee Tuck	(Malaysia) Terengganu	Season loan
	FW	(Ukraine) Yevhen Bokhashvili	(Indonesia) Persipura Jayapura	
	FW	(Timor-Leste) (Brazil) Pedro Henrique		

==== Retained ====
Pos.	Player	Ref.
DF	(France) Hérold Goulon	2 years contract signed in 2019

== Friendlies ==
=== Pre-season ===
Shah Alam City Cup (19–23 February 2021)

Win Draw Loss Fixtures

21 February 2021 1	Terengganu II	2–2	Sri Pahang	Shah Alam
	Jordan Mintah 59', 86' (pen.)		Hafiz 28'; Pedro 70'	Stadium: UiTM Stadium

23 February 2021 2	UiTM	0–0	Sri Pahang	Shah Alam
				Stadium: UiTM Stadium

Others

26 February 2021 1	Negeri Sembilan	2–0	Sri Pahang	Shah Alam
	Akono 27'; Selvan 83'			Stadium: UiTM Stadium

During season

28 March 2021 1	Sri Pahang	4–0	Kelantan United	Shah Alam
	Izzat; Bokhashvili; Lee Tuck; Baqiuddin			Stadium: UiTM Stadium

== Competitions ==
=== Malaysia Super League ===
==== League table ====
Pos	Team	Pld	W	D	L	GF	GA	GD	Pts	Qualification or relegation
8	Melaka United	22	5	9	8	25	31	−6	21 (Note: Melaka have been docked three points based on the following of the decision from FAM (Football Association of Malaysia).)	
9	Sabah	22	4	7	11	21	38	−17	19	
10	Sri Pahang	22	4	6	12	23	37	−14	18	
11	Perak (R)	22	4	4	14	20	45	−25	16	Relegation to Malaysia Premier League
12	UiTM (R)	22	3	4	15	16	41	−25	13	Relegation to Malaysia Premier League

Source: Malaysian Football League
Rules for classification: 1) Points; 2) Goal difference; 3) Number of goals scored.
(R) Relegated

==== Matches ====
6 March 2021 1	Selangor	3–1	Sri Pahang	Shah Alam
21:00 UTC+8	Buff 45', 90+3'; Shahrel 54'; Syahmi (yellow card) 44'; Mukhairi (yellow card) 79'		Azam 69'; Wagué (yellow card) 55'	Stadium: Shah Alam Stadium; Referee: Fusser Sallih

10 March 2021 2	Sri Pahang	0–2	Perak	Kuantan
21:00 UTC+8	Pedro (yellow card) 15'		Partiban 43'; Farhan 59'; Careca (yellow card) 25'	Stadium: Darul Makmur Stadium; Referee: Fairuzi Desa

13 March 2021 3	Melaka United	0–0	Sri Pahang	Krubong
21:00 UTC+8			Wagué (yellow card) 24'	Stadium: Hang Jebat Stadium; Referee: Nafeez Wahab

16 March 2021 4	Sri Pahang	2–1	Sabah	Kuantan
21:00 UTC+8	Bokhashvili 55'; Lee Tuck 70'; Jadid (yellow card) 9'; Baqiuddin (yellow card) 25'; Wagué (yellow card) 40'		Saddil 80'; Park (yellow card) 40'; Rawilson (yellow card) 54'; Alto (yellow card) 90'	Stadium: Darul Makmur Stadium; Referee: Fitri Maskon

21 March 2021 5	Petaling Jaya City	1–0	Sri Pahang	Petaling Jaya
21:00 UTC+8	Devarajan 34'			Stadium: Petaling Jaya Stadium; Referee: Tuan Mohd Yasin

2 April 2021 6	Kedah Darul Aman	3–1	Sri Pahang	Alor Setar
21:00 UTC+8	Baddrol 37', 71'; Sherman 47' (pen.)		Izzat 41'; Lee Tuck (penalty missed) 89; Goulon (red card) 17'; Azam (yellow card) 90'	Stadium: Darul Aman Stadium; Referee: Noor Azriel Baharuddin

6 April 2021 7	Sri Pahang	1–1	Terengganu	Kuantan
21:00 UTC+8	Azam 17'; Muslim (yellow card) 71'		Mintah 74' (pen.); Suhaimi (yellow card) 58'	Stadium: Darul Makmur Stadium; Referee: Hasrol Amir

10 April 2021 8	Kuala Lumpur City	2–1	Sri Pahang	Cheras
21:00 UTC+8	Paulo Josué 18'; Daniel 70'		Goulon 90'	Stadium: Kuala Lumpur Stadium; Referee: Fitri Maskon

16 April 2021 9	Sri Pahang	0–2	Johor Darul Ta'zim	Kuantan
22:00 UTC+8	Azam (yellow card) 51'; Ezanie (yellow card) 69' (yellow-red card)		Velázquez 21'; Bergson 90+2', (yellow card) 39'; Cabrera (yellow card) 45'; Corbin-Ong (yellow card) 73'	Stadium: Darul Makmur Stadium; Referee: Tuan Mohd Yasin

24 April 2021 10	Penang	3–0	Sri Pahang	Penang
22:00 UTC+8	Endrick 11'; Danial 26'; Jafri 90+1'; Quentin (yellow card) 35'			Stadium: City Stadium; Referee: Fitri Maskon

1 May 2021 11	Sri Pahang	5–0	UiTM	Kuantan
22:00 UTC+8	Lee Tuck 1'; Pedro 34'; Baqiuddin 66'; Goulon 70'; Fahmi 72' (o.g.)			Stadium: Darul Makmur Stadium; Referee: Ahmad Zuhaidi Dzulkifli

5 May 2021 12	Sri Pahang	2–2	Selangor	Kuantan
22:00 UTC+8	Hidalgo 48', (yellow card) 70'; Malik 90+6'; Baqiuddin (yellow card) 54'; Muslim (yellow card) 65'; Ashar (yellow card) 67'		Olusegun 87', (yellow card) 65'; Aung 76'; Ayimbila (yellow card) 43'; Sharul (yellow card) 81', (yellow card) 90+5' (yellow-red card)	Stadium: Darul Makmur Stadium; Referee: Suhaimi Mat Hassan

9 May 2021 13	Perak	2–3	Sri Pahang	Ipoh
22:00 UTC+8	Leandro 68' (pen.); Careca 90+5'		Aung 34'; Athiu 58', 88'	Stadium: Perak Stadium; Referee: Fusser Sallih

25 July 2021 14	Sri Pahang	1–1	Melaka United	Kuantan
21:00 UTC+8	Hidalgo 1'; Fazly (yellow card) 45'	Report	Zaharulnizam 90+7'; Robbat (yellow card) 25'; Adriano (yellow card) 28'; Akmal (yellow card) 69'	Stadium: Darul Makmur Stadium; Referee: S. Logeswaran

28 July 2021 15	Sabah	2–2	Sri Pahang	Kota Kinabalu
20:15 UTC+8	Alto (yellow card) 11'; Ivančić 58', 90+4'; Randy (yellow card) 84'	Report	Muslim (yellow card) 49'; Baqiuddin 67'; Malik 90+3'	Stadium: Likas Stadium; Referee: Zamzaidi Katimin

1 August 2021 16	Sri Pahang	1–0	Petaling Jaya City	Kuantan
21:00 UTC+8	Aung 15'; Azam (yellow card) 27'; Hidalgo (yellow card) 78'	Report	Tamilmaran (yellow card) 55'; Salamon (yellow card) 64'	Stadium: Darul Makmur Stadium; Referee: Razlan Joffri Ali

1 September 2021 17 (Note: Postponed match)	Sri Pahang	2–2	Kedah Darul Aman	Kuantan
21:00 UTC+8	Athiu 9'; Yakubu (yellow card) 27'; Loqman 87' (o.g.)	Report	Amirul 11'; Renan (yellow card) 57'; Fandi (yellow card) 61'; Syazwan 67'	Stadium: Darul Makmur Stadium; Referee: Hamdan Awang

7 August 2021 18	Terengganu	2–0	Sri Pahang	Kuala Nerus
21:00 UTC+8	da Silva 12'; Faisal 24'	Report	Goulon (yellow card) 48'	Stadium: Sultan Mizan Zainal Abidin Stadium; Referee: Mohd Amirul Izwan Yaacob

20 August 2021 19	Sri Pahang	0–2	Kuala Lumpur City	Kuantan
21:00 UTC+8	Hidalgo (yellow card) 56'; Yakubu (yellow card) 88'; Goulon (yellow card) 90+3'	Report	Morales 49', (yellow card) 56'; Zhafri 71'; Arif (yellow card) 90+2'	Stadium: Darul Aman Stadium; Attendance: 0 Referee: Muhammad Usaid Jamal

27 August 2021 20	Johor Darul Ta'zim	3–0	Sri Pahang	Iskandar Puteri
21:00 UTC+8	Bergson 8', 41', 45'; Syafiq (yellow card) 68'; Velázquez (yellow card) 73'	Report	Ashar (yellow card) 86'; Baqiuddin (yellow card) 90+1'	Stadium: Sultan Ibrahim Stadium; Attendance: 0 Referee: Mohd Fairuzi Mat Desa

5 September 2021 21	Sri Pahang	1–2	Penang	Kuantan
21:00 UTC+8	Athiu 61'; Swirad (yellow card) 64'; Hidalgo (yellow card) 66'	Report	Azwan (yellow card) 44'; Endrick 68'; Danial 72'	Stadium: Darul Makmur Stadium; Attendance: 0 Referee: Muhammad Khairulsyahmi Ahmad Khalidi

12 September 2021 22	UiTM	1–0	Sri Pahang	Shah Alam
21:00 UTC+8	Kwon 25' (pen.); Hisyamudin (yellow card) 27'; Zamir (yellow card) 90+2'	Report	Hidalgo (yellow card) 90+4'	Stadium: UiTM Stadium; Attendance: 0 Referee: Mohd Faisal Ridzuan

=== Malaysia Cup ===
==== Group stage ====
The draw for the group stage was held on 15 September 2021.

Pos	Team	Pld	W	D	L	GF	GA	GD	Pts	Qualification	KUL	SUD	PAH	PEN
1	Kuala Lumpur City	6	4	2	0	12	4	+8	14	Quarter-finals	—	4–0	3–1	1–0
2	Sarawak United	6	3	1	2	9	10	−1	10	Quarter-finals	2–2	—	1–0	1–2
3	Sri Pahang	6	2	0	4	11	7	+4	6		0–1	1–2	—	4–0
4	Penang	6	1	1	4	4	15	−11	4		1–1	1–3	0–5	—

Source: MFL, FAM

26 September 2021 1	Kuala Lumpur City	3–1	Sri Pahang	Cheras
21:00 UTC +8	Daniel 19'; Morales 47', 73'	Report	Gallifuoco 79' (o.g.)	Stadium: Kuala Lumpur Stadium; Attendance: 0 Referee: Abdul Rahman Wahab

29 September 2021 2	Sarawak United	1–0	Sri Pahang	Shah Alam
21:00 UTC +8	Sandro (yellow card) 34'; Tommy 61'; Zahril (yellow card) 75'	Report	Fazly (yellow card) 52'	Stadium: UiTM Stadium; Attendance: 0 Referee: Mohd Nafeez Abd Wahab

30 October 2021 3	Sri Pahang	4–0	Penang	Kuantan
21:00 UTC +8	Malik 11', 55'; Abubakar (yellow card) 36', (goal) 72'; Ashar (yellow card) 44'; Hidalgo 47'	Report	Khairul (yellow card) 47'; Azwan (yellow card) 73'	Stadium: Darul Makmur Stadium; Attendance: 500+ Referee: Razlan Joffri Ali

3 November 2021 4	Penang	0–5	Sri Pahang	George Town
21:00 UTC +8		Report	Athiu 10', 35', 82'; Abubakar 21'; Malik 58'	Stadium: City Stadium; Attendance: 932; Referee: Mohd Fairuzi Mat Desa

7 November 2021 5	Sri Pahang	1–2	Sarawak United	Kuantan
21:00 UTC +8	Athiu 13'	Report	Sandro 31'; Rahim 90+5'	Stadium: Darul Makmur Stadium; Attendance: 1,190+ Referee: Jeevanathan Ponniamoorthy

10 November 2021 6	Sri Pahang	0–1	Kuala Lumpur City	Kuantan
21:00 UTC +8		Report	Zhafri 83'	Stadium: Darul Makmur Stadium; Attendance: 116; Referee: Tuan Mohd Yaasin Tuan Hanafian

== Statistics ==
=== Appearances and goals ===
Players with no appearances not included in the list.

As of 10 November 2021

No.	Pos.	Name	League		Malaysia Cup		Total	
No.	Pos.	Name	Apps	Goals	Apps	Goals	Apps	Goals
1	GK	(Malaysia) Helmi Eliza	10	0	1	0	11	0
2	DF	(Malaysia) Ezanie Salleh	3(7)	0	0	0	10	0
3	DF	(France) Hérold Goulon	18(1)	2	6	0	25	2
4	DF	(Malaysia) Nicholas Swirad	3(5)	0	5(1)	0	14	0
5	DF	(Malaysia) Jadid Ilias	5(2)	0	0	0	7	0
6	DF	(Malaysia) Malik Ariff	11(2)	2	5(1)	3	19	5
8	MF	(Ghana) Yakubu Abubakar	7(1)	0	6	2	14	2
9	FW	(Australia) (South Sudan) Kenny Athiu	9(2)	4	6	4	17	8
11	MF	(Malaysia) Shahrul Aizad	2(3)	0	0	0	5	0
12	MF	(Malaysia) Baqiuddin Shamsudin	19(2)	2	3(3)	0	27	2
13	DF	(Malaysia) Ashar Al Aafiz	17(1)	0	6	0	24	0
14	FW	(Myanmar) Aung Kaung Mann	5(1)	2	0(2)	0	8	2
16	MF	(Malaysia) Hazri Rozali	0(4)	0	0	0	4	0
17	MF	(Malaysia) Zuhair Aizat	4(7)	0	4(1)	0	16	0
18	GK	(Malaysia) Daniel Wafiuddin	3	0	0	0	3	0
19	MF	(Malaysia) Sharul Nizam	2(6)	0	0(2)	0	10	0
20	MF	(Malaysia) Azam Azih	19	2	6	0	25	2
21	FW	(Malaysia) Faizal Rani	0(4)	0	0(3)	0	7	0
22	DF	(Malaysia) Fazly Mazlan	14(1)	0	4(1)	0	20	0
23	FW	(Malaysia) Izzat Awang	7(6)	1	0	0	13	1
24	DF	(Malaysia) Muslim Ahmad	20	0	2(2)	0	24	0
25	MF	(Malaysia) Hafiz Ramdan	3(7)	0	0	0	10	0
29	DF	(Malaysia) Faisal Rosli	12(6)	0	3	0	21	0
31	GK	(Malaysia) Zarif Irfan	9(1)	0	5	0	15	0
33	DF	(Malaysia) Hasnul Zaim	0(1)	0	0	0	1	0
35	FW	(Malaysia) Syaahir Saiful	2(2)	0	0(5)	0	9	0
37	MF	(Malaysia) Zazrir Naim	1	0	0	0	1	0
88	MF	(Argentina) Manuel Hidalgo	10	2	5	1	15	3
Players who have played this season but had left the club or on loan to other club
4	DF	(Lebanon) (France) Mamadou Wagué	3	0	0	0	3	0
7	MF	(England) Lee Tuck	11	2	0	0	11	2
9	FW	(Timor-Leste) (Brazil) Pedro Henrique	6(4)	1	0	0	10	1
10	FW	(Ukraine) Yevhen Bokhashvili	7(3)	1	0	0	10	1
