= Ali Imran Alimi =

Malaysian footballer

Ali Imran
Personal information
- Full name: Ali Imran bin Alimi
- Date of birth: 2 February 1998 (age 28)
- Place of birth: Kuala Pilah, Malaysia
- Height: 1.79 m (5 ft 10 in)
- Position: Centre-back

Team information
- Current team: AAK
- Number: 4

Youth career
- 2016–2017: Felda United U-21

Senior career*
Years	Team	Apps	(Gls)
2017–2019	Felda United	4	(0)
2020	Sarawak United	2	(0)
2022–23	PIB FC	8	(0)
2024–	AAK		

International career
2013–2014	Malaysia U16	13	(0)
Medal record
Men's football
Representing Malaysia
AFF U-16 Youth Championship
First place	2013 Myanmar
- * Club domestic league appearances and goals

Ali Imran bin Alimi (born 2 February 1998) is a Malaysian professional footballer who plays as a centre-back.

Ali Imran was born in Kuala Pilah, Negeri Sembilan but raised in Kuala Lumpur and Selangor. He began his football career in 2013 at Sekolah Sukan Tunku Mahkota Ismail in Bandar Penawar, Johor where he studied for 3 years and continued his career development at Malaysia Pahang Sports School in Gambang, Pahang, graduating with a Sijil Pelajaran Malaysia at the end of 2015.

== Club career ==
=== Youth ===
As soon as he graduated from Malaysia Pahang Sports School, Ali Imran signed with Felda United U21 team in 2016 to compete in the President Cup Malaysia. In the 2016 Sukma Games in Sarawak, Ali Imran was one of the players representing the Wilayah Persekutuan Kuala Lumpur football team. The team struggled their way up to the finals only to be defeated by the back-to-back Sukma Football champion, Perak with a 2–0 score.

=== Felda United ===
Few months through the season in 2017, the former head coach of Felda United, B. Sathianathan, promoted Ali Imran alongside Danial Amier Norhisham, to the first-team squad where he was initially registered with the number 31 jersey. He had to train among senior players which are more experienced and professional. Stepping into his second season with the team in 2018, he registered with his lucky number, the number 5.

He made his debut for Felda United in the Malaysia Cup on 9 September 2017 in a game against Perak. In that match, he came on as a substitute for Azriddin Rosli, and Felda lost 1–2. On 27 July 2018, Ali made his first league appearance for Felda United, starting the game in the final match of 2018 Malaysia Premier League, where the team became champions of the league. In the 2019 Super League, Ali made his first appearance of the season on 3 March 2019 on the last minute of the game against Petaling Jaya City, as a substitute for Jocinei Schad.

=== Sarawak United ===
Moving into 2020, Ali Imran signed a contract with a reformed club from East of Malaysia, Sarawak United, that is currently playing for the second division of Malaysian football, the Malaysia Premier League. Ali Imran decided to shake things up by ditching his favourite number 5 and chose to have the number 24 on his jersey. He made his first appearance for Sarawak United in their first Premier League match against Penang FA, as a substitute for Ashri Chuchu, that has gotten himself an injury in the 26th minute and Ali Imran continued to fight till the last second of the match.

== International career ==
Ali Imran began his international career at a young age of 15 years old for Malaysia Under-16 in 2013 for the AFF U-16 Youth Championship and continued on his journey in the following year for the AFC U-16 Championship, both under Malaysian U-16 coach S. Balachandran.

=== 2013 AFF U-16 Championship ===
In 2013, Ali Imran was named to join the Malaysia U-16 for the 2013 AFF U-16 Youth Championship in Myanmar. The team started off the championship by being listed in Group B to play against 4 other participating teams, Indonesia, Singapore, Laos and Philippines. The team ended up being placed on top of the table with 2 wins and 2 draws with Indonesia following close with points tied, but differed in goal difference.

On 31 August 2013, the team knocked Vietnam out in the semi-finals with a tight win of 1–0 to advance to the finals. On 2 September 2013, the 2013 AFF U16 Youth Championship finals kicked off with Malaysia U-16 going head on against Indonesia. Both teams battled out to win the title but the game ended with a draw that lead to a penalty shoot-out that puts Malaysia U-16 as the winner of the Championship with a 3–2 score against Indonesia

=== 2014 AFC U-16 Championship ===
On 6 April 2014, the draw for the competition was held in Bangkok, Thailand settling Malaysia U-16 in Group A with other qualified teams which included South Korea, Thailand and Oman. The team secured their target to merge into quarter finals with 6 points alongside South Korea that scored a big win with 9 points. On 14 September 2014, the team had to intensely face Australia in the quarter finals to be eliminated with a narrow defeat of 2–1. The team was devastated, however Malaysia achieved the best quarter-final appearance in its history of AFF U-16 Championship up to this date.

=== 2017 Southeast Asian (SEA) Games ===
On 24 May 2017, Ali Imran was listed among 26 players that was called up to join the Malaysia U-22 Southeast Asian Games Project Training Camp in preparation for the SEA Games. The training camp was held at Wisma FAM from 29 May to 23 June 2017. They flew to Xiangtan, China on 8 June 2017 their first friendly match on 10 June 2017 against China U-22 and travelled to Guangzhou on 11 June 2017 for another 2 friendly matches before flying back to Malaysia on 16 June 2017. However sadly, as soon as the flight touched down, Malaysia U-22 coach, Ong Kim Swee announced that Ali Imran and Kalaiharasan Letchumanan were dropped from the team and will no longer join the training camp.

== Career statistics ==
=== Club ===
As of 1 March 2020

Appearances and goals by club, season and competition
Club	Season	League			Cup		League Cup		Continental		Total	
Club	Season	Division	Apps	Goals	Apps	Goals	Apps	Goals	Apps	Goals	Apps	Goals
Felda United	2017	Malaysia Super League	0	0	1 (Note: Appearances in Malaysia Cup)	0	0	0	0	0	1	0
Felda United	2018	Malaysia Premier League	1	0	0	0	0	0	–		1	0
Felda United	2019	Malaysia Super League	2	0	0	0	0	0	0		2	0
Felda United	Total		3	0	1	0	0	0	0	0	4	0
Sarawak United	2020	Malaysia Premier League	1	0	0	0	0	0	0	0	1	0
Sarawak United	Total		1	0	0	0	0	0	0	0	1	0
Career total			4	0	1	0	0	0	0	0	5	0

== Honours ==
=== Club ===
Felda United

- Malaysia Premier League : 2018

=== International ===
Malaysia U-16

- AFF U-16 Youth Championship : 2013
