= Jadid Ilias =

Malaysian footballer

Personal information
- Full name: Muhammad Jadid bin Ilias
- Date of birth: 21 December 1996 (age 29)
- Place of birth: Pahang, Malaysia
- Height: 1.75 m (5 ft 9 in)
- Position: Centre-back

Team information
- Current team: Sri Pahang
- Number: 5

Youth career
- Sri Pahang
- 2019: Felda United U21

Senior career*
Years	Team	Apps	(Gls)
2018	Sultan Idris Education University	0	(0)
2019–2020	Felda United	10	(0)
2021–	Sri Pahang	7	(0)
- * Club domestic league appearances and goals as of 1 September 2021

Muhammad Jadid bin Ilias (born 21 December 1996) is a Malaysian professional footballer who plays as a centre-back for Sri Pahang.

== Career statistics ==
=== Club ===
As of 1 September 2021

Appearances and goals by club, season and competition
Club	Season	League			Cup		League Cup		Continental		Total	
Club	Season	Division	Apps	Goals	Apps	Goals	Apps	Goals	Apps	Goals	Apps	Goals
Felda United	2019	Malaysia Super League	7	0	1	0	2	0	—		10	0
Felda United	2020	Malaysia Super League	4	0	0	0	0	0	—		4	0
Felda United	Total		10	0	1	0	2	0	0	0	13	0
Sri Pahang	2021	Malaysia Super League	7	0	0	0	0	0	—		7	0
Sri Pahang	Total		7	0	0	0	0	0	0	0	7	0
Career total			0	0	0	0	0	0	0	0	0	0
