= Faiz Mazlan =

Malaysian footballer (born 1997)

Personal information
- Full name: Muhammad Faiz bin Mazlan
- Date of birth: 20 January 1997 (age 29)
- Place of birth: Selangor, Malaysia
- Height: 1.76 m (5 ft 9 in)
- Position: Attacking midfielder

Team information
- Current team: Melaka
- Number: 6

Youth career
- Frenz United
- Felda United

Senior career*
Years	Team	Apps	(Gls)
2019–2020	Felda United	26	(2)
2021	Petaling Jaya City	19	(0)
2022–2023	Penang	11	(0)
2023	→ Kelantan (loan)	13	(0)
2024–2025	Kuala Lumpur Rovers	23	(1)
2025–	Melaka		
- * Club domestic league appearances and goals

Muhammad Faiz bin Mazlan (born 20 January 1997) is a Malaysian professional footballer who plays as an attacking midfielder for Malaysia Super League club Melaka.

== Career statistics ==
=== Club ===
As of match played 23 June 2023

Appearances and goals by club, season and competition
Club	Season	League			Cup		League Cup		Continental		Total	
Club	Season	Division	Apps	Goals	Apps	Goals	Apps	Goals	Apps	Goals	Apps	Goals
Felda United	2019	Malaysia Super League	15	2	4	0	2	0	–		21	2
Felda United	2020	Malaysia Super League	11	0	–		–		–		11	0
Felda United	Total		26	2	4	0	2	0	–		32	2
Petaling Jaya City	2021	Malaysia Super League	19	0	0	0	3	0	–		22	0
Petaling Jaya City	Total		19	0	0	0	3	0	–		22	0
Penang	2022	Malaysia Super League	11	0	1	0	2	0	–		14	0
Penang	Total		11	0	1	0	2	0	–		14	0
Kelantan (loan)	2023	Malaysia Super League	2	0	0	0	0	0	–		2	0
Kelantan (loan)	Total		2	0	0	0	0	0	–		2	0
Career Total			0	0	0	0	0	0	–	–	0	0
