= 2020 Malaysia Cup =

Piala Malaysia 2020

Tournament details
- Country: Malaysia
- Dates: 6–22 November 2020 (Cancelled)
- Teams: 16

Tournament statistics
- Matches played: 7
- Goals scored: 23 (3.29 per match)
- Top goal scorer(s): (Brazil) Leandro Dos Santos (3 goals)

The 2020 Malaysia Cup (Malay: Piala Malaysia 2020) was the 94th edition of Malaysia Cup tournament organised by Football Association of Malaysia (FAM) and Malaysian Football League (MFL). Winners would qualify directly to 2021 AFC Cup group stage. Since the tournament had been cancelled, the spot was passed down to the third-placed team in the League.

On 12 November 2020, Malaysian Football League (MFL) confirmed that the tournament would not resume and be cancelled immediately. That mean's closes the season for Malaysian football in 2020 following government's rejection of MFL's appeal, including with large parts of the country in Conditional Movement Control Order (CMCO) due to COVID-19 pandemic in Malaysia.

== Format ==
In the competition, the top eleven teams from the 2020 Malaysia Super League were joined by the top five teams from the 2020 Malaysia Premier League. On 28 October 2020, Sabah FA has been excluded from the competition due to the failure to obtain the National Security Council's permission to leave the state of Sabah, which has been placed under a COVID-19 lockdown.

Recently, the Malaysian Football League (MFL) format for the 2020 Malaysia Cup has been changed following the COVID-19 pandemic that hit the country. Group stage competitions were cancelled and replaced with 16 teams by knockout, including matches in the quarter-finals and semi-finals. This competition would feature a format change: the round of 16, quarter-finals, semi-finals and final would be played in a single-leg format. The matches were played behind closed doors, though spectators could have been allowed following a review of the situation and the decisions of the national and local government.

== Round and draw dates ==
The draw for the 2020 Malaysia Cup will be held on 1 November 2020.

Phase	Round	Draw date	First leg
Knockout stage	Round of 16	1 November 2020; 11:00 UTC+8	6–8 November 2020
Knockout stage	Quarter-finals	1 November 2020; 11:00 UTC+8	12–13 November 2020
Knockout stage	Semi-finals	1 November 2020; 11:00 UTC+8	17 November 2020
Knockout stage	Final	1 November 2020; 11:00 UTC+8	22 November 2020 at Bukit Jalil National Stadium, Kuala Lumpur

== Seeding ==
Pot 1	Pot 2
Johor Darul Ta'zim; Kedah; Terengganu; Perak; Selangor; UiTM; Pulau Pinang; Kuala Lumpur	PJ City; Pahang; Melaka United; Sabah (considered as "bye"); FELDA United; Kelantan; Kuching; Kelantan United

== Knockout stage ==
The competition would be played as a mini-tournament style with remaining fixtures to be played as single legged ties. All remaining ties of the competition were played behind closed doors due to the remaining presence of the COVID-19 pandemic in Malaysia.

=== Key ===
• c/d = Cancelled

=== Bracket ===
Round of 16
Penang	3
FELDA United	1
UiTM	3
Kelantan	2
Johor Darul Ta'zim	1
Kuching	0
Kuala Lumpur
Bye
Terengganu	1
Petaling Jaya City	0
Perak	4
Kelantan United	0
Kedah	3
Pahang	2
Selangor	2
Melaka United	1

Quarter-finals
Penang	c/d
UiTM	c/d
Johor Darul Ta'zim	c/d
Kuala Lumpur	c/d
Terengganu	c/d
Perak	c/d
Kedah	c/d
Selangor	c/d

Semi-finals
Winner Quarter-final 1	c/d
Winner Quarter-final 2	c/d
Winner Quarter-final 3	c/d
Winner Quarter-final 4	c/d

Final
TBD – Bukit Jalil National Stadium
Winner Semi-final 1	c/d
Winner Semi-final 2	c/d

== Round of 16 ==
The matches were played from 6 to 8 November 2020.

Team 1	Score	Team 2
Pulau Pinang	3–1	FELDA United
Johor Darul Ta'zim	1–0	Kuching
Kedah	3–2	Pahang
Terengganu	1–0	Petaling Jaya City
Perak	4–0	Kelantan United
UiTM	3–2	Kelantan
Selangor	2–1	Melaka United
Kuala Lumpur	—	Bye

6 November 2020
21:00 UTC+8

Pulau Pinang	3–1	FELDA United
Casagrande 37'; Amer 62'; Lee 76'	Report	Vélez 49'

City Stadium, Penang
Attendance: 0 (Note: The match was played behind closed doors due to the COVID-19 pandemic in Malaysia.)
Referee: Fairuzi Mat Desa

6 November 2020
21:00 UTC+8

Johor Darul Ta'zim	1–0	Kuching
Arif 19'	Report

Tan Sri Dato Haji Hassan Yunos Stadium, Larkin
Attendance: 0
Referee: Noor Azriel Baharudin

6 November 2020
21:00 UTC+8

Kedah	3–2	Pahang
Shakir 17'; Sherman 36'; Tchétché 44'	Report	Muslim 49'; Faizal 88'

Darul Aman Stadium, Alor Setar
Attendance: 0
Referee: Nazmi Nasaruddin

7 November 2020
21:00 UTC+8

Terengganu	1–0	Petaling Jaya City
Shaakhmedov 37'	Report

Sultan Mizan Zainal Abidin Stadium, Kuala Nerus
Attendance: 0
Referee: Amirul Izwan Yaacob

7 November 2020
21:00 UTC+8

Perak	4–0	Kelantan United
Leandro 7', 21', 49'; Careca 90+1'	Report

Perak Stadium, Ipoh
Attendance: 0
Referee: Zohri Tajuddin

8 November 2020
21:00 UTC+8

UiTM	3–2	Kelantan
Arif 13', 67'; Rafie 16'	Report	Danial 61', 64'

Manjung Stadium, Seri Manjung
Attendance: 0
Referee: Fitri Maskon

8 November 2020
21:00 UTC+8

Selangor	2–1	Melaka United
Ifedayo 21'; Sandro 52'	Report	Agba 57'

Hang Jebat Stadium, Krubong
Attendance: 0
Referee: Hamdan Awang

== Quarter-finals ==
The matches should have played from 12 to 13 November 2020, but it be cancelled immediately by the MFL on 12 November 2020 following government's rejection of MFL's appeal due to COVID-19 Pandemic hit that country.

Team 1	Score	Team 2
Pulau Pinang	Cancelled	UiTM
Johor Darul Ta'zim	Cancelled	Kuala Lumpur
Terengganu	Cancelled	Perak
Kedah	Cancelled	Selangor

12/13 November 2020
21:00 UTC+8

Pulau Pinang	Cancelled	UiTM

Attendance: 0

12/13 November 2020
21:00 UTC+8

Johor Darul Ta'zim	Cancelled	Kuala Lumpur

Attendance: 0

12/13 November 2020
21:00 UTC+8

Terengganu	Cancelled	Perak

Attendance: 0

12/13 November 2020
21:00 UTC+8

Kedah	Cancelled	Selangor

Attendance: 0

== Semi-finals ==
The matches were played on 17 November 2020.

Team 1	Score	Team 2
Winner Quarter-final 1	Cancelled	Winner Quarter-final 2
Winner Quarter-final 3	Cancelled	Winner Quarter-final 4

17 November 2020
21:00 UTC+8

Winner Quarter-final 1	Cancelled	Winner Quarter-final 2

Attendance: 0

17 November 2020
21:00 UTC+8

Winner Quarter-final 3	Cancelled	Winner Quarter-final 4

Attendance: 0

== Final ==
The final were played on 22 November 2020 at the Bukit Jalil National Stadium in Kuala Lumpur, Malaysia.

22 November 2020
21:00 UTC+8

Winner Semi-final 1	Cancelled	Winner Semi-final 2

Bukit Jalil National Stadium, Kuala Lumpur
Attendance: 0

== Statistics ==
=== Goalscorers ===
As of matches played on 8 November 2020

Players sorted first by goals, then by last name.

Rank	Player	Club	Goals
1	(Brazil) Leandro Dos Santos	Perak	3
2	(Malaysia) Danial Ashraf	Kelantan	2
2	(Malaysia) Arif Anwar	UiTM	2
3	16 players	—	1

=== Hat-tricks ===
Player	For	Against	Result	Date
(Brazil) Leandro Dos Santos	Perak	Kelantan United	4–0	7 November 2020

Notes

^{4} Player scored 4 goals

=== Clean sheets ===
As of matches played on 8 November 2020.

Players sorted first by clean sheets, then by last name.

Rank	Player	Club	Clean sheets
1	(Malaysia) Izham Tarmizi	Johor Darul Ta'zim	1
1	(Malaysia) Hafizul Hakim	Perak	1
1	(Malaysia) Rahadiazli Rahalim	Terengganu	1

== See also ==
- 2020 Malaysia FA Cup
