= Danial Amier =

Malaysian footballer

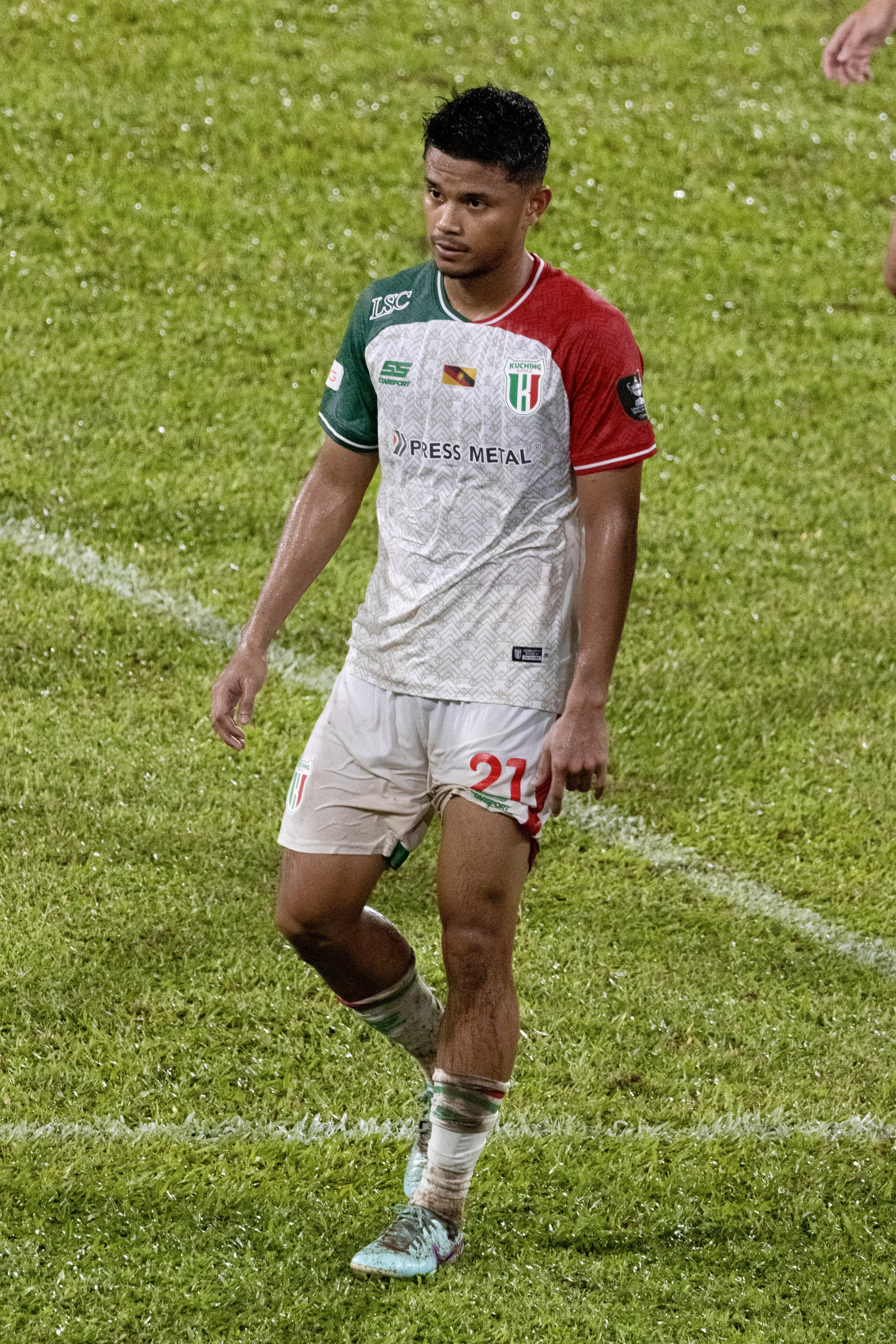
- Danial with Kuching City in 2025

Personal information
- Full name: Muhammad Danial Amier bin Norhisham
- Date of birth: 27 March 1997 (age 29)
- Place of birth: Kuala Lumpur, Malaysia
- Height: 1.75 m (5 ft 9 in)
- Position: Midfielder

Team information
- Current team: Terengganu
- Number: 21

Youth career
- 2014–2016: Frenz United
- 2017: Felda United U-21

Senior career*
Years	Team	Apps	(Gls)
2017–2020	Felda United	21	(0)
2021–2024	Johor Darul Ta'zim	3	(0)
2024–2026	Kuching City	9	(1)
2026-	Terengganu		

International career^{‡}
2015	Malaysia U19	2	(0)
2017–2019	Malaysia U23	9	(2)
2019–	Malaysia	4	(0)
Medal record
Men's football
Representing Malaysia
Malaysia U23
SEA Games
Silver medal – second place	2017 Kuala Lumpur	Football
- * Club domestic league appearances and goals as of 30 June 2026 ‡ National team caps and goals as of 21 December 2024

Muhammad Danial Amier bin Norhisham (born 27 March 1997) is a Malaysian professional footballer who plays as a midfielder for Malaysia Super League side Terengganu and the Malaysia national team.

== Club career ==
=== Youth ===
Danial was born on 27 March 1997 and was raised in Sentul, Kuala Lumpur. He entered Victoria Institution School in 2010 before transfer to Sport School Wilayah Persekutuan SMK Seri Titiwangsa, Kuala Lumpur in 2012. Danial began his football career in 2014 with a professional football club Frenz United where he was the captain of the club. In 2016, Frenz United has ceased to operate due to some problems.

Danial stood low and did not play for 8 months after Frenz United ceased the club's operation at the end of 2016. Danial has contacted his former coach, Steve McMahon who is a former Everton, Liverpool and Manchester City player, to help him find a new team. Danial also received an offer to play in Australia with NSW League One club, Dunbar Rovers but due to visa constraints, he was not able to play in Australia.

=== Felda United ===
In the 2017 season, Danial signed with Felda United U21 team. Later throughout the season, Felda United 's former head coach, B. Sathianathan, promoted Danial to the first team he was registered with the number 32 jersey, alongside Ali Imran Alimi. Danial made his competitive debut for Felda United against Pahang on 26 April 2017 in the Malaysia Super League, coming on as a 53rd-minute substitute for Azriddin Rosli in a 1–1 away draw.

=== Johor Darul Ta'zim ===
On 22 December 2020, Danial signed for Malaysia Super League champions, Johor Darul Ta'zim upon the expiration of his contract with Felda United. He makes his debut for the team in 3–0 league win against Melaka United on 2 April 2021.

==== Loan to Kuching City ====
On 2 April 2024, Danial was loaned out to Kuching City citing for more playing time. Danial was than named in the 2024–25 Malaysia Super League Team of the Season.

== International career ==
=== Youth ===
Danial began his international stage for Malaysia U19 and made 2 appearances in the 2016 AFC U-19 Championship qualification.

On 21 July 2017, Danial made his debut for Malaysia U23 against Indonesia U23 in 3–0 win in the 2018 AFC U-23 Championship qualification that was held in National Stadium, Bangkok, Thailand.

Danial also was selected to play in 2017 Southeast Asian Games.

=== Senior ===
On 30 August 2019, Danial made his senior debut for Malaysia in a friendly match against Jordan at the Bukit Jalil National Stadium. He would then go on to make another cap against Sri Lanka on 5 October 2019.

== Career statistics ==
=== Club ===
As of 10 October 2022

Club	Season	League		Cup		League Cup		Continental		Total	
Club	Season	Apps	Goals	Apps	Goals	Apps	Goals	Apps	Goals	Apps	Goals
Felda United	2017	5	0	0	0	7	1	–	–	12	1
Felda United	2018	5	0	0	0	2	0	–	–	7	0
Felda United	2019	4	0	1	0	4	1	–	–	9	1
Felda United	2020	7	1	0	0	0	0	–	–	7	1
Felda United	Total	21	1	1	0	13	1	–	–	35	3
Johor Darul Ta'zim	2021	2	0	0	0	0	0	1	0	3	0
Johor Darul Ta'zim	2022	1	0	1	0	0	0	0	0	2	0
Career total		24	0	2	0	13	1	1	0	40	2

=== International ===
As of 20 December 2024

Appearances and goals by national team and year
National team	Year	Apps	Goals
Malaysia	2019	2	0
Malaysia	2024	2	0
Total		4	0

== Honours ==
=== Club ===
Felda United

- Malaysia Premier League: 2018

==== Johor Darul Ta'zim ====
- Malaysia Super League: 2021, 2022, 2023
- Malaysia FA Cup: 2022, 2023
- Malaysia Cup: 2022, 2023
- Malaysia Charity Shield: 2022, 2023

=== International ===
Malaysia U-23

- Southeast Asian Games (silver) Silver Medal: 2017

=== Individual ===
- Malaysia Super League Team of the Season: 2024–25
