= Masaki Watanabe (footballer) =

Japanese footballer

Personal information
- Full name: Masaki Watanabe
- Date of birth: December 2, 1986 (age 39)
- Place of birth: Kyoto, Japan
- Height: 1.81 m (5 ft 11 1/2 in)
- Position: Defender

Team information
- Current team: Terengganu FC II
- Number: 5

Youth career
- 2005–2008: Kyoto Sangyo University

Senior career*
Years	Team	Apps	(Gls)
2009	Sagan Tosu	40	(2)
2010–2012	Yokohama FC	43	(3)
2013–2014	Giravanz Kitakyushu	73	(0)
2015–2016	Ventforet Kofu	4	(0)
2015	→ FC Gifu (loan)	19	(1)
2019	Perlis	3	(0)
2019–2020	Felda United	8	(0)
2020	Kelantan	8	(0)
2021–	Terengganu FC II	22	(0)
- * Club domestic league appearances and goals as of 00:52, 10 May 2019 (UTC)

Masaki Watanabe (渡邉 将基, born December 2, 1986) is a Japanese football player who plays as a defender for Terengganu FC II.

== Club statistics ==
Updated to 23 February 2018.

Club performance			League		Cup		League Cup		Total	
Season	Club	League	Apps	Goals	Apps	Goals	Apps	Goals	Apps	Goals
Japan			League		Emperor's Cup		J. League Cup		Total	
2009	Sagan Tosu	J2 League	40	2	2	1	–		42	3
2010	Yokohama FC	J2 League	30	3	2	0	–		32	3
2011	Yokohama FC	J2 League	7	0	0	0	–		7	0
2012	Yokohama FC	J2 League	6	0	2	1	–		8	1
2013	Giravanz Kitakyushu	J2 League	33	0	2	0	–		35	0
2014	Giravanz Kitakyushu	J2 League	40	0	4	1	–		44	1
2015	Ventforet Kofu	J1 League	3	0	0	0	4	0	7	0
2015	FC Gifu	J2 League	19	1	0	0	–		19	1
2016	Ventforet Kofu	J1 League	1	0	0	0	5	0	6	0
2017	Yokohama FC	J2 League	12	0	1	0	–		13	0
Malaysia			League		Malaysia FA Cup		Malaysia Cup		Total	
2020	Kelantan FA	Premier League	8	0	0	0	0	0	8	0
Total			199	6	13	3	9	0	221	9
