= Zulfahmi Awang =

Malaysian footballer

Zulfahmi
Personal information
- Full name: Zulfahmi bin Awang
- Date of birth: 26 January 1993 (age 33)
- Place of birth: Gua Musang, Kelantan, Malaysia
- Height: 1.77 m (5 ft 9 1/2 in)
- Position: Striker

Youth career
- 2015: Felda United

Senior career*
Years	Team	Apps	(Gls)
2016	Felda United	16	(2)
2016–2017	Sime Darby	36	(22)
2018–2019	Kelantan		
2018	→ D'AR Wanderers (loan)	6	(2)
2020	Felda United		
- * Club domestic league appearances and goals

Zulfahmi bin Awang (born 26 January 1993) is a Malaysian professional footballer who plays as a striker.

== Club career ==
=== Kelantan ===
In January 2018, Amirul Shafik signed a two-year contract with Malaysia Super League side Kelantan.
