= Nikola Raspopović =

Serbian footballer

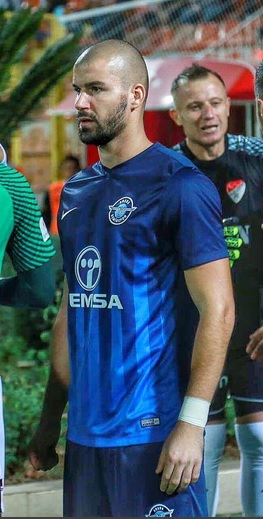
- Raspopović with Adana Demirspor in 2016

Personal information
- Full name: Nikola Raspopović
- Date of birth: 18 October 1989 (age 37)
- Place of birth: Belgrade, SFR Yugoslavia
- Height: 1.89 m (6 ft 2 in)
- Position: Centre-back

Team information
- Current team: Rad

Youth career
- Obilić
- Rad

Senior career*
Years	Team	Apps	(Gls)
2007–2015	Rad	107	(3)
2008	→ Šumadija Jagnjilo (loan)	12	(1)
2009	→ Sopot (loan)	13	(0)
2015–2016	Gaziantep BB	27	(1)
2016–2017	Adana Demirspor	25	(0)
2017	Radnički Niš	13	(1)
2018	Shakhtyor Soligorsk	0	(0)
2018–2019	Dukla Prague	13	(0)
2020	FELDA United	10	(1)
2025–	Rad	1	(0)
- * Club domestic league appearances and goals as of 15 November 2025

Nikola Raspopović (Serbian Cyrillic: Никола Распоповић; born 18 October 1989) is a Serbian footballer who plays as a centre-back for Rad.

== Career ==
Born in Belgrade, Raspopović spent the final years of his formation at Rad. He was promoted to their senior squad in the 2007–08 season, but failed to make a competitive appearance. Subsequently, Raspopović was loaned to Serbian League Belgrade clubs Šumadija Jagnjilo and Sopot in order to gain experience. He returned to Rad ahead of the 2009–10 season, making his debuts in the Serbian SuperLiga. During his spell with the Građevinari, Raspopović amassed 107 league appearances and scored three goals.

In the summer of 2015, Raspopović moved abroad to Turkey and joined Gaziantep BB. He was transferred to fellow TFF First League club Adana Demirspor in June 2016.

In the 2017 summer transfer window, Raspopović returned to Serbia and signed with Radnički Niš.

On 5 September 2018, he joined Dukla Prague. After 13 games, the club announced on 15 April 2019, that they had terminated the contract by mutual consent for family reasons.
