= Haziq Puad =

Malaysian footballer

Personal information
- Full name: Ahmad Haziq bin Ahmad Puad
- Date of birth: 26 May 1993 (age 33)
- Place of birth: Alor Setar, Malaysia
- Height: 1.84 m (6 ft 1/2 in)
- Positions: Centre back; wing back

Team information
- Current team: Melaka
- Number: 30

Youth career
- 2012: Perlis U21

Senior career*
Years	Team	Apps	(Gls)
2013–2014	Sime Darby	10	(0)
2015	UiTM		
2016–2017	MOF	34	(2)
2018	Kuantan	5	(0)
2018	Kelantan	16	(0)
2019–2020	Felda United	18	(0)
2022	Melaka United	6	(0)
2023	Perak	6	(0)
2023	→ Penang (loan)	4	(0)
2024–26	Melaka	22	(1)
- * Club domestic league appearances and goals as of 15 July 2025

Ahmad Haziq bin Ahmad Puad (born 26 May 1993) is a Malaysian professional footballer who plays as a centre-back or wing-back for Malaysia Super League club Melaka.

== Club career ==
=== Kelantan ===
On 22 May 2018, Haziq signed a six-month contract with Malaysia Super League side Kelantan.

== Career statistics ==
=== Club ===
As of match played 9 March 2019

Appearances and goals by club, season and competition
Club	Season	League			Cup		League Cup		Continental		Total	
Club	Season	Division	Apps	Goals	Apps	Goals	Apps	Goals	Apps	Goals	Apps	Goals
Kuantan	2018	Malaysia Premier League	3	0	1	0	0	0	–	–	4	0
Kuantan	Total		3	0	1	0	0	0	–	–	4	0
Kelantan	2018	Malaysia Super League	10	0	0	0	0	0	–	–	10	0
Kelantan	Total		10	0	0	0	0	0	–	–	10	0
Felda United	2019	Malaysia Super League	5	0	0	0	0	0	–	–	5	0
Felda United	Total		5	0	0	0	0	0	–	–	5	0
Career Total			0	0	0	0	0	0	–	–	0	0
