= Yakubu Abubakar =

Ghanaian footballer

Personal information
- Date of birth: 9 February 1990 (age 36)
- Place of birth: Accra, Ghana
- Height: 1.80 m (5 ft 11 in)
- Position: Central midfielder

Team information
- Current team: Kedah FA
- Number: 88

Youth career
- 2002–2006: Feyenoord Academy
- 2006–2007: Red Bull Ghana

Senior career*
Years	Team	Apps	(Gls)
2007–2009	Ashanti Gold SC	54	(3)
2009–2011	Dummiant Club	42	(5)
2011–2012	Kooroum Mahmura FC	28	(3)
2012–2014	Al Galali	9	(2)
2015	Zeyar Shwe Myay	19	(4)
2015–2016	Ayeyawady United	31	(6)
2018–2019	Rakhine United	9	(3)
2019–2020	Shan United	5	(0)
2021	Sri Pahang	2	(0)
2021–2023	Hidd SCC	14	(3)
2024–2025	Yangon United	7	(0)
2025–	Kedah FA	21	(0)

International career
2007–2008	Ghana U-17	5	(0)
2010	Ghana U-20	2	(0)
- * Club domestic league appearances and goals

Yakubu Abubakar (born 9 February 1990) is a Ghanaian professional footballer who plays as a central midfielder for Malaysia A1 Semi-Pro League club Kedah FA.

== Club career ==
Abubakar started his career with Red Bull Ghana and Ashanti Gold SC before moving abroad.

== International career ==
Abubakar played for Ghana at every youth level, having represented the nation at under-17 and under-20.
