= Jocinei =

Brazilian footballer

Personal information
- Full name: Jocinei Schad
- Date of birth: 4 February 1990 (age 36)
- Place of birth: Timbó, Brazil
- Height: 1.82 m (5 ft 11 1/2 in)
- Position: Central midfielder

Team information
- Current team: Felda United
- Number: 8

Youth career
- –2010: Joinville

Senior career*
Years	Team	Apps	(Gls)
2010–2012	Joinville	54	(31)
2012	→ América-SP (loan)	13	(4)
2012	Piracicaba	7	(1)
2012–2013	Ponte Preta	5	(0)
2013	Rio Claro	6	(1)
2013–	Coimbra	1	(1)
2013–2014	→ Corinthians (loan)	13	(6)
2014	→ Portuguesa (loan)	17	(6)
2014–2015	→ Red Bull Brasil (loan)	12	(6)
2015–2016	→ Bragantino (loan)	28	(14)
2016–2017	→ Figueirense (loan)	12	(4)
2017	CRB	0	(0)
2017–2018	Criciúma	3	(0)
2019–	Felda United	0	(0)
- * Club domestic league appearances and goals as of 6:25, 19 May 2016 (UTC)

Jocinei Schad, simply known as Jocinei, (born 4 February 1990 in Timbó) is a Brazilian football player who plays for Felda United as a central midfielder.

== Career ==
Jocinei started his youth career with Joinville, he played with them before being promoted into the first-team in 2010. He remained with Joinville for two years before leaving in 2012 after making just 4 appearances. Towards the end of his stay with Joinville, he was loaned out to América-SP. After his departure from Joinville, Jocinei agreed to join Piracicaba but left a few months later to join Ponte Preta. A move to Rio Claro followed.

After short spells with Ponte Preta and Rio Claro, he joined current club Coimbra. Despite joining in 2013, he has yet to appear in a league fixture for the club and has been loaned out five times. The first temporary transfer away from Coimbra was to Corinthians with whom he made his debut for against one of his future teams, Portuguesa. He made a total of three Série A appearances, followed by three in the 2014 Campeonato Paulista.

Jocinei then returned to Coimbra before joining Portuguesa. He appeared in 17 Série B matches for Portuguesa, scoring once versus Luverdense in August 2014. Red Bull Brasil became Jocinei's third loan spell in a year as he joined the São Paulo-based club for the Campeonato Paulista. A loan to Bragantino came next in 2015 before Jocinei joined Figueirense of Série A in 2016, also on loan.

== Honours ==
Joinville

- Campeonato Brasileiro Série C: 2011
