= Faizal Rani =

Malaysian footballer

Personal information
- Full name: Mohd Faizal bin Abdul Rani
- Date of birth: 17 January 1994 (age 32)
- Place of birth: Kuala Besut, Malaysia
- Height: 1.66 m (5 ft 5 in)
- Position: Forward

Youth career
- –2015: Sri Pahang

Senior career*
Years	Team	Apps	(Gls)
2015–2016	Sri Pahang	13	(0)
2017–2019	Shahzan Muda	0	(0)
2020–	Sri Pahang	4	(1)
- * Club domestic league appearances and goals as of 10 May 2021

Mohd Faizal bin Abdul Rani (born 17 January 1994) is a Malaysian footballer who plays as a forward.
