= 2020 in Malaysian football =

Football in Malaysia
- Season: 2020

Men's football
- Super League: Johor Darul Ta'zim
- Premier League: Penang
- Liga M3: not awarded
- FA Cup: not awarded
- Challenge Cup: not awarded
- Community Shield: Johor Darul Ta'zim

The 2020 season of competitive association football in Malaysia.

== Promotion and relegation ==
Promoted to Malaysia Super League

- Sabah
- PDRM
- UiTM

Relegated to the Malaysia Premier League

- PKNS
- PKNP
- Kuala Lumpur

Promoted to Malaysia Premier League

- Kelantan United
- Kuching

Relegated to Liga M3

- Sarawak

Promoted to Liga M3

- KSR SAINS
- IKRAM Muda

Relegated to Liga M4

- Penjara

== New and withdrawn teams ==
=== New teams ===
- Semarak (Liga M3)
- Kuala Lumpur Rovers (Liga M3)
- Melaka United (Liga M3)

=== Withdrawn teams ===
- Johor Bahru (Liga M3)
- SAMB (Liga M3)

== National team ==
Win Draw Lose

=== Malaysia national football team ===
==== Friendly ====
No friendly matches involving Malaysia was held from 1 January to 15 March due to no FIFA International Match Calendar window during that time, and after 15 March because of restrictions due to COVID-19 pandemic in Malaysia.

==== 2022 World Cup qualification ====
On 5 March 2020, FIFA announced that it would be monitoring the health situation in the region for possible rescheduling of matchdays 7 through 10 due to the COVID-19 pandemic. Later on 9 March, FIFA and AFC jointly announced that the matches on matchdays 7–10 due to take place in March and June 2020 were postponed, with the new dates to be confirmed. However, subject to approval by FIFA and AFC, and agreement of both member associations, the matches may be played as scheduled provided that the safety of all individuals involved meets the required standards. On 5 June, AFC confirmed that matchdays 7 and 8 were scheduled to take place on 8 and 13 October respectively while matchdays 9 and 10 were scheduled to kick off on 12 and 17 November. On 12 August, FIFA announced that the matches scheduled for October and November 2020 would be rescheduled to 2021.

8 October 2020 2022 WCQ R2	United Arab Emirates	Postponed	Malaysia	Dubai, United Arab Emirates
--:-- UTC+4		Report (FIFA); Report (AFC)		Stadium: Al Maktoum Stadium

13 October 2020 2022 WCQ R2	Malaysia	Postponed	Vietnam	Kuala Lumpur, Malaysia
--:-- UTC+8		Report (FIFA); Report (AFC)		Stadium: Bukit Jalil National Stadium

17 November 2020 2022 WCQ R2	Thailand	Postponed	Malaysia	TBD, Thailand
--:-- UTC+7		Report (FIFA); Report (AFC)		Stadium: TBD

=== Malaysia national under-19 football team ===
==== 2020 AFC U-19 Championship ====
The 2020 AFC U-19 Championship was originally scheduled to run between 14 and 31 October 2020, but was postponed twice due to the COVID-19 pandemic. It was later cancelled on 25 January 2021.

16 October 2020 2020 AFC Championship Group stage	Tajikistan	Postponed, later cancelled	Malaysia	AGMK Stadium, Olmaliq
19:00

19 October 2020 2020 AFC Championship Group stage	Malaysia	Postponed, later cancelled	Qatar	AGMK Stadium, Olmaliq
19:00

22 October 2020 2020 AFC Championship Group stage	Malaysia	Postponed, later cancelled	Yemen	AGMK Stadium, Olmaliq
19:00

== League season ==
=== Liga Super ===
Pos	Team	Pld	W	D	L	GF	GA	GD	Pts	Qualification or relegation
1	Johor Darul Ta'zim (C, Q)	11	9	2	0	33	8	+25	29	Qualification for AFC Champions League group stage
2	Kedah (Q)	11	7	1	3	20	13	+7	22	Qualification for AFC Cup group stage
3	Terengganu (Q)	11	6	1	4	24	14	+10	19	Qualification for AFC Cup group stage
4	Perak	11	5	3	3	21	19	+2	18	
5	Selangor	11	4	5	2	26	19	+7	17	
6	UiTM	11	5	2	4	17	15	+2	17	
7	Petaling Jaya City	11	3	5	3	17	16	+1	14	
8	Pahang	11	4	2	5	18	18	0	14	
9	Melaka United	11	4	2	5	13	16	−3	11 (Note: Melaka have been docked three points following the decision from FAM.)	
10	Sabah	11	2	3	6	12	24	−12	9	
11	Felda United (R)	11	1	4	6	12	27	−15	7	Relegation to Malaysia Premier League
12	PDRM (R)	11	0	2	9	5	29	−24	−1 (Note: PDRM have been docked three points following the decision from FAM.)	Relegation to Malaysia Premier League

Source: Malaysian Football League
Rules for classification: 1) Points; 2) Goal difference; 3) Number of goals scored.
(C) Champions; (Q) Qualified for the phase indicated; (R) Relegated

=== Liga Premier ===
Pos	Team	Pld	W	D	L	GF	GA	GD	Pts	Qualification or relegation
1	Penang (P)	11	8	2	1	24	8	+16	26	Promotion to Super League
2	Terengganu II (Note: Johor Darul Ta'zim II, Perak II, Selangor II and Terengganu II cannot be promoted from Malaysia Premier League and play in Malaysia Cup as Johor Darul Ta'zim F.C., Perak FA, Selangor F.C. and Terengganu FC (their parent clubs) remain in Malaysia Super League and play in Malaysia Cup. Should the team be relegated to Malaysia Premier League or will not play in Malaysia Cup, Johor Darul Ta'zim II, Perak II, Selangor II and Terengganu II will have to drop to Malaysia M3 League or will play in Malaysia Cup.)	11	7	1	3	17	14	+3	22	
3	Kuala Lumpur (P)	11	6	3	2	21	14	+7	21	Promotion to Super League
4	Kuching	11	5	1	5	17	19	−2	16	
5	Johor Darul Ta'zim II	11	4	3	4	20	17	+3	15	
6	Kelantan	11	5	3	3	14	11	+3	15 (Note: Kelantan have been docked three points following the club’s failure to comply with FIFA’s decision.)	
7	Selangor II	11	4	1	6	17	23	−6	13	
8	Kelantan United	11	4	0	7	13	19	−6	12	
9	UKM	11	3	3	5	11	17	−6	12	Withrew from Premier League and dissolved.
10	Sarawak United	11	3	2	6	14	16	−2	11	
11	Negeri Sembilan	11	3	2	6	12	20	−8	11	
12	Perak II	11	1	5	5	11	13	−2	8	

Updated to match(es) played on 31 October 2020. Source: MFL
Rules for classification: 1) Points; 2) Goal difference; 3) Number of goals scored.
(P) Promoted

=== Liga M3 ===
The league was abandoned after only 2 games played due to COVID-19 pandemic in Malaysia.

Group A

Pos	Team	Pld	W	D	L	GF	GA	GD	Pts	
1	Kuala Lumpur Rovers	2	2	0	0	5	1	+4	6	
2	Armed Forces	2	1	1	0	4	0	+4	4	
3	Langkawi City	2	1	1	0	4	2	+2	4	
4	Harini	2	1	0	1	9	3	+6	3	
5	Manjung City	2	1	0	1	2	3	−1	3	
6	Perlis United	2	1	0	1	2	5	−3	3	
7	Thai Selangor	2	1	0	1	3	9	−6	3	Club resigned and dissolved.
8	Northern Lions-Mahsa	2	0	1	1	3	4	−1	1	Club resigned and dissolved.
9	IKRAM Muda	2	0	1	1	1	3	−2	1	Club resigned and dissolved.
10	Klasiko	2	0	0	2	1	4	−3	0	Club resigned and dissolved.

Updated to match(es) played on 15 March 2020. Source: FAM, Liga Malaysia
Rules for classification: 1) Points; 2) Goal difference; 3) Number of goals scored.

Group B

Pos	Team	Pld	W	D	L	GF	GA	GD	Pts	
1	Kuala Terengganu Rovers	2	2	0	0	2	0	+2	6	Club resigned and dissolved.
2	Protap	2	1	0	1	6	4	+2	3	Club resigned and dissolved.
3	Immigration	2	1	0	1	4	3	+1	3	
4	KSR SAINS	2	1	0	1	3	2	+1	3	
5	Melaka City	2	1	0	1	2	3	−1	3	Club resigned and dissolved.
6	Semarak	2	1	0	1	2	3	−1	3	Club resigned and dissolved.
7	Ultimate	2	1	0	1	3	5	−2	3	
8	PIB	2	0	2	0	2	2	0	2	
9	Sarawak	2	0	1	1	2	3	−1	1	Club resigned and dissolved.
10	Melawati	2	0	1	1	0	1	−1	1	Club resigned and dissolved.

Updated to match(es) played on 15 March 2020. Source: FAM, Liga Malaysia
Rules for classification: 1) Points; 2) Goal difference; 3) Number of goals scored.

== Domestic Cups ==
=== Charity Shield ===
28 February 2020
21:00 UTC+8

Johor Darul Ta'zim	1–0	Kedah
Maurício 44'

Sultan Ibrahim Stadium
Attendance: 34,525
Referee: Razlan Jeffri Ali

=== FA Cup ===
2020
21:00 UTC+8

Tournament cancelled

Bukit Jalil National Stadium, Bukit Jalil, Kuala Lumpur

=== Malaysia Cup ===
November 2020
21:00 UTC+8

Tournament cancelled

Bukit Jalil National Stadium, Bukit Jalil

=== Malaysia Challenge Cup ===
October 2020
21:00 UTC+8

Tournament cancelled

October 2020
21:00 UTC+8

Tournament cancelled

== Malaysian clubs in Asia ==
=== Johor Darul Ta'zim ===
==== AFC Champions League ====
===== Group stage =====
Pos	Team	Pld	W	D	L	GF	GA	GD	Pts	Qualification	VIS	SUW	GZE	JDT
1	(Japan) Vissel Kobe	4	2	0	2	4	5	−1	6	Advance to knockout stage	—	0–2	0–2	~~5–1~~
2	(South Korea) Suwon Samsung Bluewings	4	1	2	1	3	2	+1	5	Advance to knockout stage	0–1	—	0–0	~~25 Nov~~
3	(China) Guangzhou Evergrande	4	1	2	1	4	4	0	5		1–3	1–1	—	~~4 Dec~~
4	(Malaysia) Johor Darul Ta'zim	0	0	0	0	0	0	0	0	Withdrew, results expunged (Note: Johor Darul Ta'zim were unable to travel to Qatar to play the final four matches of the group stage after their application for permission to travel was refused by the Malaysian government due to COVID-19 pandemic travel restrictions. They were considered to have withdrawn from the competition, and their results were expunged.)	~~1 Dec~~	~~2–1~~	~~19 Nov~~	—

Source: AFC
Rules for classification: Tiebreakers
Notes:

12 February 2020	Vissel Kobe (Japan)	5–1	(Malaysia) Johor Darul Ta'zim	Noevir Stadium Kobe, Kobe
19:00 UTC+9	Ogawa 13', 58', 72'; Furuhashi 28'; Douglas 65'	Live Report; Stats Report	Safawi 27' (pen.)	Attendance: 7,256; Referee: Alireza Faghani (Iran)

3 March 2020	Johor Darul Ta'zim (Malaysia)	2–1	(South Korea) Suwon Samsung Bluewings	Sultan Ibrahim Larkin Stadium, Johor
20:45 UTC+8	Cabrera 13' (pen.); Maurício 73'	Live Report; Stats Report	Antonis 51'	Attendance: 25,524; Referee: Alireza Faghani (Iran)

8 April 2020	Suwon Samsung Bluewings (South Korea)	v	(Malaysia) Johor Darul Ta'zim	Suwon World Cup Stadium, Suwon
19:30 UTC+9		Live Report; Stats Report

21 April 2020	Johor Darul Ta'zim (Malaysia)	v	(Japan) Vissel Kobe	Sultan Ibrahim Larkin Stadium, Johor
20:45 UTC+8		Live Report; Stats Report

5 May 2020	Guangzhou Evergrande (China)	v	(Malaysia) Johor Darul Ta'zim	Tianhe Stadium, Guangzhou
18:00 UTC+8		Live Report; Stats Report

20 May 2020 (Note: The AFC announced on 29 January 2020 that the group stage matches which Chinese teams were supposed to host on matchdays 1, 2 and 3 would be switched with the corresponding away matches due to the coronavirus outbreak in China. After the Australian federal government banned foreigners travelling from China, Football Federation Australia told the AFC that Australia could no longer host matches against Chinese teams. The AFC held an emergency meeting on 4 February 2020 to determine plans for the tournament, including but not limited to re-scheduling of matches in the East Region. After the meeting, the AFC decided to postpone matches involving Chinese clubs from the first three match days except for Chiangrai United versus Beijing FC.)	Johor Darul Ta'zim (Malaysia)	v	(China) Guangzhou Evergrande	Sultan Ibrahim Larkin Stadium, Johor
20:45 UTC+8		Live Report; Stats Report

=== Kedah ===
==== AFC Champions League ====
===== Qualifying play-offs =====
21 January 2020	Kedah (Malaysia)	5–1	(Hong Kong) Tai Po	Darul Aman Stadium, Alor Setar
21:00 UTC+8	Tchétché 3', 21', 90+2'; Hadin 47', 66'	Live Report; Stats Report	Chan Man Fai 68'	Attendance: 19,803; Referee: Saoud Al-Adba (Qatar)

28 January 2020	FC Seoul (South Korea)	4–1	(Malaysia) Kedah	Seoul World Cup Stadium, Seoul
19:00 UTC+9	Park Chu-young 38' (pen.); Park Dong-jin 49'; Osmar 63'; Alibaev 90+2'	Live Report; Stats Report	Osmar 52' (o.g.)	Attendance: 5,373; Referee: Omar Al-Yaqoubi (Oman)
