= 2020 Malaysia FA Cup =

Tournament details
- Country: Malaysia
- Teams: 59

Final positions
- Champions: not awarded

Tournament statistics
- Matches played: 27
- Goals scored: 107 (3.96 per match)
- Top goal scorer(s): (Malaysia) Azrizan Ahmad (Malaysia) Faiz Ibrahim (5 goals)
- All statistics correct as of 23 February 2020.

The 2020 Malaysia FA Cup is the 31st season of the Malaysia FA Cup, a knockout competition for Malaysia's state football association and clubs. The winners will be assured a place for the 2021 AFC Cup group stage.

59 teams entered the competition.

Due to the COVID-19 pandemic, the tournament was cancelled.

== Qualified teams ==
The following teams are qualified for the competition. Reserve teams are excluded.

Liga Super the 12 teams of the 2020 season	Liga Premier the 8 non-reserve teams of the 2020 season	Liga M3 the 19 teams of the 2020 season	Liga M4 the 20 teams of the social leagues around Malaysia
Felda United; Johor Darul Ta'zim; Kedah; Sabah; Melaka United; Pahang; Perak; Petaling Jaya City; PDRM; UiTM; Selangor; Terengganu	Kelantan; Kelantan United; Kuala Lumpur; Kuching; Negeri Sembilan; Penang; Sarawak United; UKM	Armed Forces; Harini; IKRAM Muda; Immigration; Klasiko; KSR Sains; Kuala Terengganu Rovers; Kuala Lumpur Rovers; Langkawi City; Manjung City; Melaka City; Melawati; Northern Lions-Mahsa; PIB; Protap; Sarawak; Semarak; Thai Selangor; Ultimate	Andersernion; Delima Warriors; Gamestop; Isma Shah Alam; Kerteh F.C.; Kickers; Kuala Perlis; Kuatagh; Markless; Nor Farhan; Nossa Bukit Jelutong; Pandan United; Real Chukai; Red Spade United; Shah Alam United; Southern; Spirito; SSFC; Staroba; Tun Razak City

== Round and draw dates ==
Round	Draw date	1st leg	2nd leg
Preliminary	29 January 2020, 15:00 UTC+8	15–16 February	
FA1 Round	17 February 2020, 15:00 UTC+8	22-23 February	
FA2 Round	24 February 2020, 15:45 UTC+8	17-18 March	
FA3 Round			

== Preliminary ==
Key: (1) = Liga Super; (2) = Liga Premier; (3) = Liga M3; (4) = Liga M4

The draw for the preliminary round was held on 29 January 2020 at 15:00 involving 40 teams from Liga M3 and Liga M4. 9 teams from the Liga M3 and M4 have won byes in the first round. The matches will be held on February 15 and 16, 2020.

15 February 2020	Andersernion FC (4)	2–2 (a.e.t.) (9–10 p)	SA United FC (4)	Ipoh
16:15 UTC+8				Stadium: PCRC Field

15 February 2020	Kuala Terengganu Rovers (3)	4–0	Ultimate (3)	Kuala Berang
16:15 UTC+8	Hasbullah 20'; Zaruizwan 23', 38'; Asysham 54'			Stadium: Kuala Berang Stadium

15 February 2020	Red Spade United FC (4)	1–6	Sarawak FA (3)	Pandan Perdana, Ampang Jaya
16:15 UTC+8	Muhamad Syafit 2'		Azrizan Ahmad 11', 60', 63', 81'; Amar Muaz 73'; Muhammad Hafizie 75'	Stadium: MPAJ Stadium

15 February 2020	Real Chukai (4)	1–0	Melawati (3)	Kemaman
16:15 UTC+8	Syakir Ridzuan 20'			Stadium: Mak Chili Stadium

15 February 2020	Pandan United FC (4)	0–1	Langkawi City (3)	Kuala Lumpur
16:15 UTC+8			Shahrul Akmal 56'	Stadium: KLFA Academy Football Arena

15 February 2020	KB Isma Shah Alam (4)	1–4	Protap (3)	Kajang
16:15 UTC+8				Stadium: Penjara Stadium

15 February 2020	Melaka City (3)	2–1	IKRAM Muda (3)	Melaka City, Melaka
16:15 UTC+8	Amirul Syafiq 40'; Mohamad Amin 51'		Alif Mazlan 66'	Stadium: Hang Tuah Stadium

15 February 2020	Markless ST (4)	2–1	Spirito FC (4)	Subang Jaya
16:15 UTC+8				Stadium: MPSJ Stadium

16 February 2020	Harini KS (3)	5–2	Kuala Perlis FC (4)	Kuala Selangor
16:15 UTC+8	Raslam Khan 23'; Asrol 60'; Metha Viblo 80'; Amirul 84'; Fakhrurazi 85'		Norhamizaref Hamid 25'; Shukor Azmi 60'	Stadium: Sports Complex Main Stadium

16 February 2020	Southern FC (4)	1–1 (a.e.t.) (3–2 p)	Manjung City (3)	Shah Alam
16:15 UTC+8	How Eng Hua 35'		Muazzim 46'	Stadium: Panasonic Stadium

16 February 2020	Gamestop FC (4)	1–0	Semarak (3)	Kuala Lumpur
16:15 UTC+8	Surain 72'			Stadium: Police Training Centre Football Arena

16 February 2020	Kerteh FC (4)	0–2	NLFC-MAHSA (3)	Kemaman
16:15 UTC+8			Khairul Affandi 17'; Mohd Faiz Subri 81'	Stadium: Mak Chili Stadium

16 February 2020	Klasiko (3)	0–3	Kuala Lumpur Rovers (3)	Subang Jaya
16:15 UTC+8			Izat Ikmal 37'; Davy 43', 61'	Stadium: MPSJ Stadium

16 February 2020	Delima Warriors FC (4)	1–3	Armed Forces (3)	Kuala Berang
16:15 UTC+8	Herma 14'		Faiz 41'; Rafizol 44', 87'	Stadium: Kuala Berang Stadium

SSFC (4)	3–0 ^{1}	PIB (3)

Notes:

^1 PIB FC's participation was canceled due to a failure to complete the registration of players and officials into the MyPAS FAM system. As such, the PIB FC team was eliminated from the FA Cup 2020 and a 3-0 victory over the SSFC.

== Round 1 (FA1) ==
Key: (1) = Liga Super; (2) = Liga Premier; (3) = Liga M3; (4) = Liga M4

The draw for the 1st round was held on 17 February 2020 at 15:00 involving 24 teams from Liga M3 and Liga M4.

22 February 2020	Protap (3)	4–0	Nor Farhan FC (4)	Cyberjaya
16:15 UTC+8	Najib 2', 39' (pen.); Ammar 53'; Rahizi 56'			Stadium: MMU Mini Stadium

22 February 2020	SSFC (4)	5–1	Kickers FC (4)	Port Dickson
16:15 UTC+8	18'; 23'; 36'; 80'; 85'		15'	Stadium: Merdeka Field

22 February 2020	Armed Forces (3)	8–0	SA United FC (4)	Kuala Lumpur
16:15 UTC+8	Faiz 5', 21', 40', 49'; Rafizol 53', 55'; Venice Elphi 59'; Norfareez 86'			Stadium: Mindef Mini Stadium

22 February 2020	Tun Razak City FC (4)	1–6	Kuatagh FC (4)	Shah Alam
16:15 UTC+8				Stadium: PANASONIC Stadium

22 February 2020	Harini KS (3)	0–1	NLFC-MAHSA (3)	Serdang
21:00 UTC+8			Khairul Affandi 27'	Stadium: UPM Stadium

22 February 2020	Kuala Terengganu Rovers (3)	4–1	Thai Selangor (3)	Kuala Terengganu
21:00 UTC+8	Azuhal 5'; Hakimi Mazlan 18'; Hakimi Nuwawi 57'; Saiful Nizam 78'		Mohd Izzaruddin 45'	Stadium: Sultan Ismail Nasiruddin Shah Stadium

23 February 2020	Staroba FC (4)	0–2	Immigration (3)	Nilai
16:15 UTC+8			Mohd Syafiq 25'; 84'	Stadium: USIM Stadium

23 February 2020	Markless ST (4)	2–1	Melaka City (3)	Kuala Berang
16:15 UTC+8	37'; 82'		21' Muhammad Yusri	Stadium: Kuala Berang Stadium

23 February 2020	KSR SAINS (3)	5–0	Nossa Bukit Jelutong FC (4)	Seremban
16:15 UTC+8	21'; 42'; 67'; 79'; 89'			Stadium: PBNS Rhino Rahang Square

23 February 2020	Sarawak FA (3)	1–0	Real Chukai (4)	Kuching
20:15 UTC+8	Azrizan Ahmad 63'			Stadium: Sarawak Stadium

23 February 2020	Kuala Lumpur Rovers (3)	4–1	Southern FC (4)	Cheras, Kuala Lumpur
21:00 UTC+8	Davy 2', 79'; Ezequiel Agüero 45'; Syed Ariff 56'		90+5'	Stadium: KLFA Stadium

23 February 2020	Langkawi City (3)	2–1	Gamestop FC (4)	Langkawi
21:00 UTC+8	Ijezie Michael 10', 47' (pen.)		Rahimi 81'	Stadium: LADA Stadium

== Round 2 (FA2) ==
Key: (1) = Liga Super; (2) = Liga Premier; (3) = Liga M3; (4) = Liga M4

The draw for the 2nd round was held on 24 February 2020 at 15:45 involving 32 teams from Liga Super, Liga Premier, Liga M3 and Liga M4.

17 March 2020	Sabah (1)	v	Kuala Lumpur (2)	Kota Kinabalu
20:15 UTC+8				Stadium: Likas Stadium

17 March 2020	FELDA United (1)	v	Kelantan United (2)	Bandar Pusat Jengka, Maran
21:00 UTC+8				Stadium: Tun Abdul Razak Stadium

17 March 2020	Melaka United (1)	v	Langkawi City (3)	Krubong, Melaka City
21:00 UTC+8				Stadium: Hang Jebat Stadium

17 March 2020	Markless ST (4)	v	Armed Forces (3)	Kuala Terengganu
21:00 UTC+8				Stadium: Sultan Ismail Nasiruddin Shah Stadium

17 March 2020	Kelantan (2)	v	Protap (3)	Kota Bharu
21:00 UTC+8				Stadium: Sultan Muhammad IV Stadium

17 March 2020	Penang (2)	v	Negeri Sembilan (2)	George Town
21:00 UTC+8				Stadium: City Stadium

18 March 2020	KSR SAINS (3)	v	Kuatagh F.C. (4)	Paroi, Seremban
16:15 UTC+8				Stadium: Tuanku Abdul Rahman Stadium

18 March 2020	SSFC (4)	v	UKM (2)	Selayang
16:15 UTC+8				Stadium: Selayang Stadium

18 March 2020	Sarawak FA (3)	v	Terengganu (1)	Kuching
20:15 UTC+8				Stadium: Sarawak Stadium

18 March 2020	NLFC-MAHSA (3)	v	PDRM (1)	Kangar
21:00 UTC+8				Stadium: Tuanku Syed Putra Stadium

18 March 2020	Perak (1)	v	Kuala Terengganu Rovers (3)	Ipoh
21:00 UTC+8				Stadium: Perak Stadium

18 March 2020	Kuala Lumpur Rovers (3)	v	Johor Darul Ta'zim (1)	Cheras. Kuala Lumpur
21:00 UTC+8				Stadium: Kuala Lumpur Stadium

18 March 2020	UiTM (1)	v	Kuching (2)	Shah Alam
21:00 UTC+8				Stadium: UiTM Stadium

18 March 2020	Kedah (1)	v	Pahang (1)	Alor Setar
21:00 UTC+8				Stadium: Darul Aman Stadium

18 March 2020	Selangor (1)	v	Sarawak United (2)	Selangor
21:00 UTC+8

18 March 2020	Petaling Jaya City (1)	v	Immigration (3)
21:00 UTC+8

== Quarter-finals ==
=== Bracket ===
Quarterfinals

Semifinals

Final

=== Summary ===
Team 1	Agg.	Team 2	1st leg	2nd leg

=== Matches ===
v

v

v

v

v

v

v

v

== Semi-finals ==
=== Summary ===
Team 1	Agg.	Team 2	1st leg	2nd leg

=== Matches ===
v

v

v

v

== Final ==
v

== Top goalscorers ==
As of 23 February 2020

Rank	Player	Club	Goals
1	(Malaysia) Azrizan Ahmad	Sarawak	5
1	(Malaysia) Faiz Ibrahim	Armed Forces	5
3	(Ivory Coast) Davy Angan	Kuala Lumpur Rovers	4
3	(Malaysia) Rafizol Roslan	Armed Forces	4
5	(Nigeria) Ijezie Michael	Langkawi City	2
5	(Malaysia) Khairul Affandi	Northern Lions-Mahsa	2
5	(Malaysia) Najib Abdullah	Protap	2
5	(Malaysia) Zarulizwan Mazlan	Kuala Terengganu Rovers	2

== See also ==
- 2020 Malaysia Super League
- 2020 Malaysia Premier League
- 2020 Malaysia M3 League
- 2020 Malaysia M4 League
