= 2019 Malaysia M3 League =

Malaysia M3 League
- Season: 2019
- Promoted: Kelantan United; Kuching FA
- Relegated: Penjara; Tun Razak
- Matches: 182
- Goals: 746 (4.1 per match)
- Top goalscorer: Fakhrul Zaman (28 goals)
- Biggest home win: Banggol Tokku 10–0 Tun Razak (15 June 2019); Armed Forces 10–0 Tun Razak (6 October 2019)
- Biggest away win: Tun Razak 0–14 Ultimate (20 October 2019)
- Highest scoring: 14 goals Tun Razak 0–14 Ultimate (20 October 2019)
- Longest winning run: 11 matches Kelantan United
- Longest unbeaten run: 21 matches Kelantan United
- Longest winless run: 17 matches Tun Razak
- Longest losing run: 17 matches Tun Razak
- All statistics correct as of 17 November 2019.

The 2019 Malaysia M3 League was the 1st season of the Malaysia M3 League that replaced the former Malaysia FAM League.

== Establishment and format ==
This season saw a revamp of the competition's format by the Football Association of Malaysia (FAM). Announced earlier on 24 November 2018 by FAM deputy president Yusoff Mahadi, the format of the new season was outlined in a meeting by FAM's Local Competition Committee and were announced in a media statement on 19 December 2018.

The format will be reverted to a straight knock-out tournament format (a format used before 2008), as opposed to the league format used since 2008. 64 teams competed for the FAM Cup, including 6 teams confirmed earlier to participate in the Malaysia FAM Cup, and teams promoted to the 2019 Malaysia Premier League. The rest of the teams included were 19 teams nominated by FAM's associate members, and teams from the newly created Malaysia M4 League, whose selection was subject to methods decided by the Malaysian Football League. The champions of the 2019 Malaysia FAM Cup then competed with the last-placed 2019 Malaysia Premier League team in a play-off match for a slot to participate in the 2020 Malaysia Premier League.

Earlier, there was speculation that the league organization might be taken over by the Malaysian Football League, organizers of the Malaysia Super League and the Malaysia Premier League, having been held by the FAM since 1951, but this was clarified in an FAM media statement that the FAM will cooperate with the MFL for the organization of the tournament, with the FAM still holding major responsibilities and ownership of the tournament and the rights of it. MFL covered the cost of the teams participating from the first round up until the quarter-finals, while the FAM covered the cost of the teams participating from that point onwards.

== Season Changes ==
The following teams have changed division since the 2018 season.

=== To Malaysia M3 League ===
Relegated from Premier League

- None ^{2}

Existing teams (From FAM League)

- Armed Forces
- Kelantan United
- Kuching

Promoted from the Malaysia M4 League

- Banggol Tok Ku – TAL Cup Winner
- Batu Dua – South Selangor League Winner
- Dak-dak Melawati – Selangor Social Premier League Winner
- Langkawi Glory United – Subang Football League Winner
- Johor Bahru – Johor Darul Ta’zim League (HM Sultan of Johor Cup) Winner
- Penjara – PBNS President Cup Winner
- Protap – Shah Alam League Winner
- Puchong Fuerza – Puchong Community League Winner
- SAMB – Melaka Division 1 Winner
- Ultimate – AXA Klang Valley League Winner

New Team

- Tun Razak F.C.

=== From Malaysia FAM League ===
Promoted to the Premier League

- Selangor United ^{1}
- Perlis ^{2}

=== Teams withdrawn ===
- Terengganu Hanelang
- Petaling Jaya Rangers
- Marcerra United
- Kuala Lumpur City Hall
- Shahzan Muda
- Ministry of Finance
- D'AR Wanderers
- Terengganu City ^{2}
- Young Fighters
- KL Cops ^{3}
- Tentera Darat ^{4}
- Uptown ^{3}

=== Name changes ===
- ATM FA separate and formed Armed Forces FC, and relocated to Kuala Lumpur.
- Glory United FC was renamed to Langkawi Glory United, and relocated to Langkawi.
- MPKB-BRI U-BeS FC was renamed to Kelantan United.

Notes:

^1 Promoted by the finalist of the 2018 FAM Cup.

^2 Originally Terengganu II were relegated from 2018 Malaysia Premier League and Terengganu City F.C. were promoted by winning the 2018 Malaysia FAM Cup; however the Malaysian Football League blocked Terengganu City's promotion due to financial issues, granted Terengganu II's to stay in the Malaysia Premier League, and accepted Perlis FA's application to be promoted to the Malaysia Premier League, replacing the expelled Kuantan FA

^3 Originally KL Cops from the 2018 DD Social M5 League, and Uptown F.C. from the 2018 Sunarize Soccer M5 League were promoted to the 2019 Malaysia M3 League by winning their respective leagues; however the teams were not registered to the 2019 Malaysia M3 League due to unknown reasons.

^4Tentera Darat F.A. from the 2018 Kuala Lumpur M5 Super League were not registered to the 2019 Malaysia M3 League due to being in the same division as their parent club, Armed Forces.

== Teams ==
As of 11 February 2019, 14 teams confirmed their participation in the 2019 Malaysia M3 League.

- Armed Forces
- (Terengganu) Banggol Tokku
- (Selangor) Batu Dua
- (Kuala Lumpur) DDM FC
- (Kedah) Langkawi Glory United
- Johor Bahru
- Kelantan United
- (Sarawak) Kuching
- (Malaysia) Penjara
- (Selangor) Protap
- (Selangor) Puchong Fuerza
- (Malacca) SAMB
- (Kuala Lumpur) Tun Razak
- (Selangor) Ultimate

== Clubs locations ==
Locations of teams in the 2019 Malaysia M3 League
Kuala Lumpur

=== Venues ===
Team	Location	Stadium	Capacity
Armed Forces	Kuala Lumpur	Mindef Stadium	5,000
Batu Dua	Kemaman	Mak Chili Mini Stadium	TBA
Banggol Tok Ku	Kuala Berang	Kuala Berang Mini Stadium	1,000
Dak-dak Melawati	Kuala Lumpur	KLFA Academy Football Field	TBA
Langkawi Glory United	Langkawi	Langkawi Stadium	10,000
Johor Bahru	Iskandar Puteri	Educity Stadium	6,000
Johor Bahru	Kulai	Kulai Mini Stadium	1,000
Kelantan United	Kota Bharu	Sultan Muhammad IV Stadium	30,000
Kuching	Kuching	Sarawak State Stadium	26,000
Kuching	Kuching	Sarawak Stadium	40,000
Penjara	Kajang	Kajang Prison Complex Mini Stadium	1,000
Protap	Kuala Lumpur	UM Arena	1,000
Puchong Fuerza	Puchong	MMU Mini Stadium	2,500
SAMB	Malacca City	Hang Tuah Stadium	1,000
SAMB	Krubong	Hang Jebat Stadium	40,000
Tun Razak	Kuala Lumpur	Jalan Raja Muda Abdul Aziz Mini Stadium	3,000
Ultimate	Kuala Lumpur	Pulapol Football Field	TBA

== Personnel and sponsoring ==
Team	Head coach	Captain	Kit manufacturer	Sponsor
Armed Forces	(England) Kevin Lee Cooper	(Malaysia) Venice Elphi	Ego Sports	My Soccer Store
Batu Dua	(Malaysia) Che Ku Marzuki	(Malaysia) Saifulnizam Miswan	Kaki Jersi	Yakult, HDR Project, MZ cafe03, Habiel Project, Mytrdes
Banggol Tok Ku	(Malaysia) Haris Safwan Kamal	(Malaysia) Nor Fazly Alias	NT	Mada Construction
Dak-dak Melawati	(Malaysia) Mohammad Aidil Ramly	(Malaysia) Fahrul Razi	Kazza Networks	Terang Bulan Sdn.Bhd, MKA Concept Ent.
Langkawi Glory United	(Malaysia) Manja Man	(Malaysia) Muhammad Al-Hafiz	Lotto	Mai Langkawi
Johor Bahru	(Malaysia) Zainor Kasmani	(Malaysia) Kamarul Afiq Kamaruddin	Nike	Green Valley Eco Resort
Kuching	(Malaysia) Ideris Utong	(Malaysia) Rafiezan Razali	Starsport	Kuching, Yakult
Kelantan United	(Malaysia) Zahasmi Ismail	(Malaysia) Shahrizan Ismail	SkyHawk	Mysports Station, U-Shop
Penjara	(Malaysia) Roslan Othman	(Malaysia) Akmal Chin	SkyHawk	Prestige Geomatic
Protap	(Serbia) Dusan Momcilovic	(Malaysia) Anwar Luqman	Kaki Jersi	Carving Crew Design, HARINI SDN. BHD.
Puchong Fuerza	(Malaysia) Nazrulerwan Makmor	(Malaysia) Arman Fareez	Kaki Jersi	
Tun Razak	(Malaysia) Azman Adnan	(Malaysia) Syazwan Rani	SkyHawk & Panzer	Rimbun Teguh Trading
SAMB	(Malaysia) Hamdan Mohamad	(Malaysia) Nazmee Ari	Heat	Syarikat Air Melaka
Ultimate	(Malaysia) Zulkhairi Mohd Zabidi	(Malaysia)	Firhan Sports	Fitz Ultimate Garage

=== Coaching changes ===
Note: Flags indicate national team as has been defined under FIFA eligibility rules. Players may hold more than one non-FIFA nationality.

Team	Outgoing coach	Manner of departure	Date of vacancy	Position in table	Incoming coach	Date of appointment
Batu Dua	(Malaysia) Zulhamizan Zakaria	Sacked	1 April 2019	6th	(Malaysia) Che Ku Marzuki	1 April 2019
Protap	(Malaysia) Shahidan Rusly	Sacked	June 2019	14th	(Serbia) Dusan Momcilovic	June 2019

=== Foreign players ===
The number of foreign players is restricted to two each team.

Note: Flags indicate national team as has been defined under FIFA eligibility rules. Players may hold more than one non-FIFA nationality.

Club	Player 1	Player 2	Former player ^{1}
Armed Forces			
Banggol Tok Ku			
Batu Dua	**(Guinea) Mamadou Berete**	**(Madagascar) Carlos Zozimar**	(France) L'Imam Seydi (Serbia) Ljubo Baranin **(Nigeria) Ovie Precious**
Dak-dak Melawati	**(South Korea) Lee Kyeong-su**	**(Argentina) Nicholas Dul**	
Langkawi Glory United	**(Brazil) Everton Souza Santos**	**(Romania) Georgian Mugurel Stamate**	
Johor Bahru	**(Ghana) Patrick Asare**	**(Nigeria) Jose Alex**	
Kelantan United	**(The Gambia) Alfusainey Gassama**	(Guinea) Seydou Sako	(Madagascar) Carlos Zozimar
Kuching	(Japan) Yuta Suzuki		
Penjara	**(South Korea) Kim Sung-ho**		
Protap	**(Democratic Republic of the Congo) Metha Viblo Apingi**	**(Uganda) Vino Ramazani**	
Puchong Fuerza	**(Ghana) Hans Kwofie**	**(Nigeria) Sunday Matthew Idoko**	(Brazil) Andre Luis (Brazil) Diogo Olievera
SAMB			
Tun Razak			(Brazil) Rafael Marti
Ultimate	(Senegal) Faye Jacque	(Nigeria) Chukwu Nnabuike	

- Players name in **bold** indicates that the player was registered during the mid-season transfer window.
- **^1** Foreign players who left their clubs or were de-registered from the playing squad due to medical issues or other matters.

== Results ==
=== League table ===
Pos	Team	Pld	W	D	L	GF	GA	GD	Pts	Qualification or relegation
1	Kelantan United (C, P)	26	21	3	2	93	20	+73	66	Promoted to the Liga Premier
2	(Sarawak) Kuching (O, P)	26	18	5	3	58	21	+37	59	Advance to Play-off promotion
3	Armed Forces	26	13	10	3	60	24	+36	49	
4	(Selangor) Puchong Fuerza	26	13	6	7	71	40	+31	45	
5	(Selangor) Ultimate	26	13	6	7	76	48	+28	45	
6	(Selangor) Protap	26	11	4	11	47	58	−11	37	
7	(Terengganu) Banggol Tokku	26	10	5	11	52	49	+3	35	
8	(Kuala Lumpur) DDM FC	26	10	4	12	60	54	+6	34	
9	(Malacca) SAMB	26	9	6	11	38	38	0	33	Withdrew from M3 League.
10	(Selangor) Batu Dua	26	8	3	15	46	72	−26	27	
11	Johor Bahru	26	6	7	13	40	53	−13	25	Withdrew from M3 League.
12	(Kedah) Langkawi Glory United	26	7	4	15	47	63	−16	25	
13	(Malaysia) Penjara (R)	26	6	6	14	36	61	−25	24	Relegated to the Liga M4
14	(Kuala Lumpur) Tun Razak (R)	26	2	1	23	17	140	−123	7	Relegated to the Liga M4

Source: FAM-CMS
Rules for classification: 1) Points; 2) Goal difference; 3) Number of goals scored.
(C) Champions; (O) Play-off winners; (P) Promoted; (R) Relegated

=== Result table ===
Home \ Away	ARM	BD	BTK	DDM	LGU	JB	KLU	KCH	PNJ	PRO	PFZ	SAM	TRZ	ULT
Armed Forces	—	8–2	1–1	3–1	0–0	1–1	1–0	2–1	2–2	1–0	1–1	1–0	10–0	4–0
Batu Dua	0–1	—	1–2	1–2	1–9	3–0	0–10	3–5	3–2	4–0	0–6	1–1	5–0	1–1
Banggol Tok Ku	0–5	2–0	—	2–1	3–2	1–2	0–2	0–1	2–0	5–1	0–4	3–1	10–0	4–7
Dak-dak Melawati	1–3	4–4	1–1	—	0–1	4–2	0–5	1–1	4–0	1–2	2–5	2–1	9–0	4–3
Langkawi Glory United	1–0	1–0	2–0	1–8	—	6–3	0–5	0–4	3–5	1–2	0–1	1–1	0–2	1–3
Johor Bahru	1–2	3–1	3–1	4–2	3–3	—	3–3	0–1	0–1	1–2	3–3	2–2	1–0	1–4
Kelantan United	2–2	2–0	2–0	3–0	7–0	3–0	—	1–1	3–0	3–0	2–1	2–1	3–1	5–1
Kuching	1–0	4–1	2–0	0–0	1–0	1–0	2–1	—	3–0	6–0	1–0	2–0	6–0	0–1
Penjara	1–1	1–4	1–1	0–2	2–1	1–1	1–4	2–2	—	2–5	1–1	0–3	6–1	2–5
Protap	3–1	5–1	4–1	2–1	0–0	0–4	1–4	2–2	0–2	—	1–6	2–1	8–0	1–4
Puchong Fuerza	2–2	0–2	3–4	2–4	4–1	2–2	2–3	3–4	4–1	3–1	—	4–0	2–0	4–1
SAMB	1–1	0–1	1–1	2–1	4–3	2–0	0–4	2–1	1–0	1–2	1–2	—	7–0	2–2
Tun Razak	0–5	0–7	1–7	2–4	1–10	2–0	0–10	2–4	2–3	1–1	0–3	0–1	—	0–14
Ultimate	2–2	3–0	1–1	4–1	3–0	2–0	3–4	0–2	3–0	2–2	3–3	0–2	4–2	—

Updated to match(es) played on 17 November 2019. Source: AFL
Legend: Blue = home team win; Yellow = draw; Red = away team win.
For upcoming matches, an "a" indicates there is an article about the rivalry between the two participants.

=== Positions by round ===
Team ╲ Round	1	2	3	4	5	6	7	8	9	10	11	12	13	14	15	16	17	18	19	20	21	22	23	24	25	26
Kelantan United	1	4	3	4	3	3	3	2	2	2	2	2	2	2	2	1	1	1	1	1	1	1	1	1	1	1
Kuching	4	5	5	6	4	4	1	1	1	1	1	1	1	1	1	2	2	2	2	2	2	2	2	2	2	2
Armed Forces	6	3	6	5	5	5	5	4	3	3	4	3	3	3	3	4	4	3	3	3	3	3	3	3	3	3
Puchong Fuerza	3	1	2	3	6	6	6	6	5	4	5	5	5	6	7	7	6	6	6	5	4	4	4	4	4	4
Ultimate	11	11	8	11	11	7	8	8	8	8	6	7	8	9	9	8	9	8	8	7	5	5	5	5	5	5
Protap	8	13	13	14	14	14	14	14	14	14	14	14	13	12	12	11	11	10	10	9	9	9	7	7	6	6
Banggol Tok Ku	12	12	7	9	10	11	9	7	7	7	7	6	6	8	6	5	5	5	4	4	6	6	6	6	8	7
Dak-dak Melawati	2	2	1	1	1	1	2	3	4	5	3	4	4	4	4	3	3	4	6	6	7	7	8	8	9	8
SAMB	9	9	11	10	7	8	10	10	10	9	10	9	9	7	8	9	7	7	7	8	8	8	9	9	7	9
Batu Dua	7	6	4	2	2	2	4	5	6	6	8	8	7	5	5	6	8	9	9	11	11	11	12	11	10	10
Johor Bahru	10	10	12	12	12	12	12	12	12	11	11	11	11	11	11	12	12	12	12	12	13	13	13	13	13	11
Langkawi Glory United	14	14	14	13	13	13	13	13	13	13	13	13	12	13	13	13	13	13	13	13	12	12	11	10	11	12
Penjara	13	8	10	8	8	9	7	9	9	10	9	10	10	10	10	10	10	11	11	10	10	10	10	12	12	13
Tun Razak	5	7	9	7	9	10	11	11	11	12	12	12	14	14	14	14	14	14	14	14	14	14	14	14	14	14

Leader
Relegation to Malaysia M4 League

== Play-offs ==
The runner-up of the Malaysia M3 League will play a one-legged play-off against the last-placed Malaysia Premier League team to decide the second team to be promoted to the 2020 Malaysia Premier League.

23 November 2019
20:15 UTC+8

Kuching FA	3-1	Sarawak
Sahran 9'; Hafis 77'; Joseph 85'		Hudson 85'

Sarawak Stadium, Sarawak

== Season statistics ==
=== Top scorers ===
As of matches played on 17 November 2019.

Players sorted first by goals, then by last name.

Rank	Player	Club	Goals
1	(Malaysia) Fakhrul Zaman	Kelantan United	28
2	(The Gambia) Alfusainey Gassama	Kelantan United	27
3	(Niger) Chukwu Nnabuike	Ultimate	22
3	(Malaysia) Rafizol Roslan	Armed Forces	22
5	(Malaysia) Joseph Kalang Tie	Kuching	17
6	(Malaysia) Shahrul Hakim	Kelantan United	15
7	(Senegal) Faye Jacque	Ultimate	13

=== Hat-tricks ===
Player	For	Against	Result	Date
(Malaysia) Fakhrul Zaman	Kelantan United	Langkawi Glory United	7 – 0 (H)	16 March 2019
(Malaysia) Nabil Ahmad Lapti	Ultimate	Tun Razak	4 – 2 (H)	30 March 2019
(Malaysia) Nabil Ahmad Lapti	Ultimate	Penjara	3 – 0 (H)	21 April 2019
(Malaysia) Akmal Aizat	Penjara	Langkawi Glory United	3 – 5 (A)	27 April 2019
(Malaysia) Ros Mohd Muharam	Banggol Tok Ku	Tun Razak	10 – 0 (H)	15 June 2019
(The Gambia) Alfusainey Gassama	Kelantan United	Penjara	1 – 4 (A)	23 June 2019
(Malaysia) Joseph Kalang Tie	Kuching	Batu Dua	3 – 5 (A)	7 July 2019
(Nigeria) Mamadou Berete	Batu Dua	Kuching	3 – 5 (H)	7 July 2019
(South Korea) Lee Kyeong Su	Dak-dak Melawati	Tun Razak	9 – 0 (H)	7 July 2019
(Nigeria) Mamadou Berete	Batu Dua	Tun Razak	0 – 7 (A)	28 July 2019
(The Gambia) Alfusainey Gassama^{4}	Kelantan United	Batu Dua	0 – 10 (A)	24 August 2019
(Malaysia) Shamerul Aziz	SAMB	Tun Razak	7 – 0 (H)	25 August 2019
(Malaysia) Hattaphon Bun An	Langkawi Glory United	Johor Bahru	6 – 3 (H)	7 September 2019
(Malaysia) Rafizol Roslan^{5}	Armed Forces	Batu Dua	8 – 2 (H)	8 September 2019
(Malaysia) Shahrul Hakim	Kelantan United	Dak-dak Melawati	0 – 5 (A)	15 September 2019
(Niger) Chukwu Nnabuike	Ultimate	Penjara	2 – 5 (A)	28 September 2019
(The Gambia) Alfusainey Gassama	Kelantan United	Tun Razak	0 – 10 (A)	29 September 2019
(Malaysia) Shahrul Hakim	Kelantan United	Tun Razak	0 – 10 (A)	29 September 2019
(Malaysia) Nizad Ayub	Kelantan United	Tun Razak	0 – 10 (A)	29 September 2019
(Ghana) Hans Kwofie	Puchong Fuerza	Penjara	4 – 1 (H)	4 October 2019
(Malaysia) Rafizol Roslan^{4}	Armed Forces	Tun Razak	10 – 0 (H)	6 October 2019
(Malaysia) Haikal Nazri^{5}	Langkawi Glory United	Tun Razak	1 – 10 (A)	13 October 2019
(Malaysia) Zulfahamzie Tarmizi	Langkawi Glory United	Tun Razak	1 – 10 (A)	13 October 2019
(Malaysia) Shafizan Ramli^{4}	Ultimate	Tun Razak	0 – 14 (A)	20 October 2019
(Niger) Chukwu Nnabuike	Ultimate	Tun Razak	0– 14 (A)	20 October 2019
(Senegal) Faye Jaque	Ultimate	Tun Razak	0– 14 (A)	20 October 2019
(The Gambia) Alfusainey Gassama^{4}	Kelantan United	Langkawi Glory United	0 – 5 (A)	27 October 2019
(Malaysia) Shafizan Ramli	Ultimate	Banggol Tok Ku	4 – 7 (A)	2 November 2019
(Malaysia) Hakimi Mazlan	Banggol Tok Ku	Ultimate	4 – 7 (H)	2 November 2019
(Malaysia) Afif Najmi	Dak-dak Melawati	Batu Dua	4 – 4 (H)	3 November 2019

Notes

^{4} Player scored 4 goals
^{5} Player scored 5 goals
(H) – Home team
(A) – Away team

== See also ==
- 2019 Malaysia Super League
- 2019 Malaysia Premier League
- 2019 Malaysia M4 League
- 2019 Malaysia FA Cup
- 2019 Malaysia Cup
- 2019 Malaysia Challenge Cup
- 2019 Piala Presiden
- 2019 Piala Belia
- List of Malaysian football transfers 2019
