= 2019 Malaysia FA Cup =

Piala FA

Tournament details
- Country: Malaysia
- Dates: 16 February – 27 July 2019
- Teams: 59

Final positions
- Champions: Kedah (5th title)
- Runners-up: Perak

Tournament statistics
- Matches played: 64
- Goals scored: 236 (3.69 per match)
- Top goal scorer: (Malaysia) Fakhrul Zaman (7 goals)

The 2019 Malaysia FA Cup (also known as Shopee Malaysia FA Cup for sponsorship reasons) was the 30th edition of the Malaysia FA Cup, a knockout competition for Malaysia's state football association and clubs. The winners were assured a place for the 2020 AFC Champions League preliminary round 2.

59 teams entered the competition.

== Qualified teams ==
The following teams are qualified for the competition. Reserve teams are excluded.

Liga Super the 12 teams of the 2019 season	Liga Premier the 9 non-reserve teams of the 2019 season	Liga M3 the 14 teams of the 2019 season	Liga M4 the 24 teams of the social leagues around Malaysia
Felda United; Johor Darul Ta'zim; Kedah; Kuala Lumpur; Melaka United; Pahang; Perak; PJ City; PKNP; PKNS; Selangor; Terengganu	Kelantan; Negeri Sembilan; PDRM; Penang; Sabah; Sarawak; Selangor United; UiTM; UKM	Armed Forces; Batu Dua; Banggol Tokku; DDM; Glory United; Johor Bahru; Kelantan United; Kuching; Penjara; Protap; Puchong Fuerza; SAMB; Tun Razak; Ultimate	Ampang United; Blastier Galicia; FC Pemanis; ISMA F.C.; Jerantut; Kampung Raja Uda; Kingstown-Klang; Klasiko F.C.; KSR Sains; Kuatagh F.C.; Markless; MD Besut; MOFAH F.C.; MPKJ; Newbies F.C.; PIB; Raja Permin; Rawang City; Real Chukai; SA United; Shah Alam Antlers; Klang Southern F.C.; XBBSB

== Round and draw dates ==
Round	Draw date	1st leg	2nd leg
Preliminary	9 February 2019, 17:00 UTC+8	16–17 February	
First Round	18 February 2019, 14:00 UTC+8	2–3 March	
Second Round	4 March 2019, 15:00 UTC+8	2–3, 9 April	
Third Round	4 April 2019, 15:00 UTC+8	16–17 April	
Quarter-finals	18 April 2019, 15:00 UTC+8	30 April–1 May	10–11 May
Semi-finals	18 April 2019, 15:00 UTC+8	22 June	29–30 June
Final	18 April 2019, 15:00 UTC+8	27 July	

== Preliminary ==
Key: (1) = Liga Super; (2) = Liga Premier; (3) = Liga M3; (4) = Liga M4

The draw for the preliminary round was held on 9 February 2019 at 17:00 involving 38 teams from Liga M3 and Liga M4. JBFA and MD Besut received bye into the First Round. Eighteen matches took place from 16 to 17 February 2019.

16 February 2019	Kuching (3)	0–0 (a.e.t.) (4–2 p)	Armed Forces (3)	Kuching, Sarawak
15:30 UTC+8				Stadium: Sarawak State Stadium

16 February 2019	Kuatagh (4)	0–2	FC Pemanis (4)	Kuala Lumpur
16:15 UTC+8			Ahmad Shahrin 18'; Ahmad Sufian 50'	Stadium: MINDEF Mini Stadium

16 February 2019	Raja Permin (4)	3–5	Klasiko (4)	Kuala Terengganu, Terengganu
16:15 UTC+8	Nor Kamali 11', 79', 87'		Norhizwan Hassan 45+4'; Akhir Bahari 50'; Amir Safuan 52', 83'; Hafiz Aziz 73'	Stadium: Gong Badak Sport Complex Synthetic Field

16 February 2019	MPKJ (4)	2–1	Kingstown-Klang (4)	Cyberjaya, Selangor
16:15 UTC+8	Hafiz Zailani 11'; Aiman Ruslan 23'		Ibnu Hisyam 15'	Stadium: MMU Stadium

16 February 2019	PIB (4)	5–0	Ampang United (4)	Serdang, Selangor
16:15 UTC+8	Muszaki Abu Bakar 11'; Azwan Yaim 23', 36'; Huzaini Ikhram 61'; Nazrien Azmi 67'			Stadium: UPM Stadium

16 February 2019	BTK (3)	4–1	SA United (4)	Hulu Terengganu, Terengganu
16:15 UTC+8	Ros Muhd Muharam 15'; Saiful Muda 82', 90+5'; Amirul Dzulkarnain 90+3'		Ahmad Faedzal 16'	Stadium: Kuala Berang Mini Stadium

16 February 2019	Southern (4)	1–4	Kelantan United (3)	Subang Jaya, Selangor
16:15 UTC+8	Khairul Effendy 19'		Fakhrul Zaman 17', 60', 87'; Shamsul Kamal 33'	Stadium: MPSJ Stadium

17 February 2019	XBBSB (4)	0–4	MOFAH (4)	Sungai Buloh, Selangor
16:15 UTC+8			Ikmal Zikram 75', 78'; Aliff Izwan 80' (pen.); Eddy Chandra 88'	Stadium: IGB International School

17 February 2019	Shah Alam Antlers (4)	0–1	Real Chukai (4)	Shah Alam, Selangor
16:15 UTC+8			Ramadhan Jalil 7'	Stadium: UiTM Stadium

17 February 2019	KSR Sains (4)	4–2	Markless (4)	Paroi, Negeri Sembilan
16:15 UTC+8	Naqiuddin Amran 30'; Firdaus Azizul 67', 76'; Norfaizzal Faroq Zaharuddin 85'		Roslee Ariffin 75'; Haziq Yusoff 88'	Stadium: Tuanku Abdul Rahman Stadium

17 February 2019	DDM (3)	0–1	SAMB (3)	Taman Melawati, Kuala Lumpur
16:15 UTC+8			Zamree Jani 57'	Stadium: KLFA Field

17 February 2019	Newbies (4)	1–5	Protap (3)	Pandan Perdana, Kuala Lumpur
16:15 UTC+8	Hairi Afiq Halim 20'		Anwar Luqman 4' (pen.); Syafiq Abd Hamid 16', 32', 73'; Shahizan Ismail 78'	Stadium: MPAJ Stadium

17 February 2019	Glory United (3)	2–3	Ultimate(3)	Subang Jaya, Selangor
16:15 UTC+8	Norhafizani Jailani 57'; Shafizi Sehrom 81'		Ahmad Nizam Rodzi 15' (pen.), 90'; Fadhil Azmi 32'	Stadium: MPSJ Stadium

17 February 2019	Tun Razak (3)	1–1 (a.e.t.) (4–3 p)	Puchong Fuerza (3)	Kampung Baru, Kuala Lumpur
16:15 UTC+8	Azuwan Abdul Rahman 105+1'		Lot Abu Hassan 117'	Stadium: Jalan Raja Muda Abdul Aziz Mini Stadium

17 February 2019	ISMA (4)	0–6	Penjara (3)	Kajang, Selangor
16:15 UTC+8			Nur Zaidi Bunari 39'; Azrol Izwan Azman 44', 75'; Hasrul Nurkholis Hashim 67', 69'; Akmal Aizat 72'	Stadium: Kajang Prison Complex Field

17 February 2019	Blastier Galicia (4)	1–3	Jerantut (4)	Serdang, Selangor
16:15 UTC+8	Rahimy Mohd 45+3'		Ahmad Azrul Azrie 21', 89'; Solehudin Abd Jalil 48' (pen.)	Stadium: UPM Stadium

17 February 2019	Rawang City(4)	1–17	Batu Dua (3)	Pandan Perdana, Kuala Lumpur
21:00 UTC+8	Zhafiran Ahmad Ramli 30'		Manaf Mamat 4', 9', 45+1', 59', 68', 84'; L'Imam Seydi 13', 36', 65'; Fakhrurazi Musa 33'; Badrul Hisyam 43'; Faizal Abd Aziz 44'; Mohd Rizua 51', 72', 82'; Mohd Aizat 76'; Azidan Sarudin 80'	Stadium: MPAJ Stadium

17 February 2019	KRU (4)	2–1	MP Port Dickson (4)	Subang Jaya, Selangor
21:00 UTC+8	Azhar Hamzah 17'; Nor Nahrul Hayat 40' (pen.)		Al Rifael Abdul Rahman 77'	Stadium: MPSJ Stadium

== First round ==
The draw for the first round was held on 18 February 2019 at 14:00 involving JBFA, MD Besut and 18 teams that progressed from preliminary round. Ten matches took place from 2 to 3 March 2019.

2 March 2019	MPKJ (4)	0–8	Kelantan United (3)	Cyberjaya, Selangor
16:15 UTC+8			Fakhrul Zaman 10', 14', 42'; Shahrul Hakim 22', 68', 79' (pen.); Famirul Asyraf 44'; Fikram Mohammed 90+1'	Stadium: MMU Stadium

2 March 2019	PIB (4)	2–1	Real Chukai (4)	Serdang, Selangor
16:15 UTC+8	Fikri Elhan 49'; Faizul Herman 59'		Ahmad Faris Star 5'	Stadium: UPM Stadium

2 March 2019	FC Pemanis (4)	0–3	Kuching (3)	Hulu Terengganu, Terengganu
16:15 UTC+8			Hafis Saperi 45'; Hairol Mokhtar 68'; Ahmad Shakir Tuah 90+1'	Stadium: Kuala Berang Mini Stadium

2 March 2019	MD Besut (4)	1–2 (a.e.t.)	Jerantut (4)	Kuala Terengganu, Terengganu
16:15 UTC+8	Manaf Mansor 35'		Nor Hafiz Sulaiman 5'; Mamadou Berete 110'	Stadium: Sultan Ismail Nasiruddin Shah Stadium

2 March 2019	Protap (3)	2–1	BTK (3)	Subang Jaya, Selangor
21:00 UTC+8	Anwar Luqman Nor 1'; Syafiq Abdul Hamid 51'		Saiful Nizam Abdullah 67'	Stadium: MPSJ Stadium

2 March 2019	Batu Dua (3)	2–1	Klasiko (4)	Kuala Lumpur
21:00 UTC+8	Fakhrurazi Musa 45+1'; Faizal Abd Aziz 85'		Faiq Shah 89' (pen.)	Stadium: UM Arena Stadium

2 March 2019	KRU (4)	0–2	JBFA (3)	Bangi, Selangor
21:00 UTC+8			Musleyadi Mansor 9'; Umar Arshad 89'	Stadium: INSPEN Stadium

3 March 2019	Ultimate (3)	2–1	KSR Sains (4)	Pandan Perdana, Kuala Lumpur
16:15 UTC+8	M. Terence 28'; Azlan Zainal 88' (pen.)		Norfaizzal Faroq 60'	Stadium: MPAJ Stadium

3 March 2019	Penjara (3)	6–3	MOFAH (4)	Kajang, Selangor
16:15 UTC+8	Amiruldin Zainal Abidin 4'; Azrul Izwan Azman 28'; Hasrol Nurkholis Hashim 48', 48', 77'; Izzudin Zainuddin 75'		Shamil Shah Kassim 25', 85'; Alif Izwan 42'	Stadium: Kajang Prison Complex Field

3 March 2019	Tun Razak (3)	3–1	SAMB (3)	Kampung Baru, Kuala Lumpur
16:15 UTC+8	Badrulhisyam Azmi 24'; Shamirul Rani 26'; Bertim Rafael 90+5'		Zamree Jani 54'	Stadium: Jalan Raja Muda Abdul Aziz Mini Stadium

== Second round ==
The draw for the second round was held on 4 March 2019 at 15:00 involving 12 teams from Liga Super, 9 teams from Liga Premier and 10 teams that progressed from first round. Fourteen matches took place from 2 to 3 April 2019. Postponed match between PDRM and Sarawak will be held on 9 April 2019. Johor Darul Ta'zim received bye into the Third Round.

2 April 2019	Kuching (3)	0–1	Felda United (1)	Kuching, Sarawak
15:30 UTC+8		Report	S. Chanturu 90+3'	Stadium: Sarawak State Stadium; Referee: S. Logeswaran

2 April 2019	UKM (2)	5–1	Protap (3)	Bangi, Selangor
16:15 UTC+8	Milad Zeneyedpour 34', 62'; Mateo Roskam 45+4', 65', 89'	Report	Hariz Saim 50'	Stadium: UKM Bangi Stadium; Referee: Ridhwan Abdul Rahman

2 April 2019	Kelantan (2)	0–3	Selangor (1)	Kota Bharu, Kelantan
21:00 UTC+8		Report	Syazwan Zainon 62'; Faiz Nasir 65', 89'	Stadium: Sultan Muhammad IV Stadium; Referee: Zamzaidi Katimin

2 April 2019	Terengganu (1)	5–0	Ultimate (3)	Kuala Terengganu, Terengganu
21:00 UTC+8	Ashari Samsudin 1'; Igor Zonjić 74'; Sanjar Shaakhmedov 76'; Nasrullah Haniff 86' (pen.); Khairul Izuan 90'	Report		Stadium: Sultan Ismail Nasiruddin Shah Stadium; Referee: Ku Alauddin Ku Muhammad

2 April 2019	Jerantut (4)	3–0	JBFA (3)	Jengka, Pahang
21:00 UTC+8	Hafiz Sulaiman 31'; Hariz Irfan 71'; Shazlan Zaidan 90'	Report		Stadium: Tun Abdul Razak Stadium; Referee: Ridhuan Rozali

3 April 2019	Batu Dua (3)	1–2	PKNP (1)	Kuala Terengganu, Terengganu
16:15 UTC+8	Mohd Rizua 33'	Report	Giancarlo 59', 68'	Stadium: Sultan Ismail Nasiruddin Shah Stadium; Referee: Muhammad Nasruddin Tamrin

3 April 2019	PKNS (1)	3–2	Melaka United (1)	Shah Alam, Selangor
21:00 UTC+8				Stadium: Shah Alam Stadium

3 April 2019	Kedah (1)	3–2 (a.e.t.)	Selangor United (2)	Alor Star, Kedah
21:00 UTC+8				Stadium: Darul Aman Stadium

3 April 2019	Perak (1)	2–1	Negeri Sembilan (2)	Ipoh, Perak
21:00 UTC+8				Stadium: Perak Stadium

3 April 2019	Pahang (1)	4–0	PIB (4)	Kuantan, Pahang
21:00 UTC+8		Report		Stadium: Darul Makmur Stadium

3 April 2019	UiTM (2)	0–2	PJ City (1)	Shah Alam, Selangor
21:00 UTC+8		Report	Safee Sali 8'; Pedro 30'	Stadium: UiTM Stadium; Referee: Khirulazuan Kidam

3 April 2019	Kelantan United (3)	1–0	Sabah (2)	Kota Bharu, Kelantan
21:00 UTC+8	Fakhrul Zaman 6'			Stadium: Sultan Muhammad IV Stadium

3 April 2019	Penang (2)	1–0	Penjara (3)	Batu Kawan, Penang
21:00 UTC+8	Ndumba Makeche 66'			Stadium: Penang State Stadium

3 April 2019	Kuala Lumpur (1)	3–0	Tun Razak (3)	Bandar Tun Razak, Kuala Lumpur
21:00 UTC+8	Indra Putra 33'; Irfan Zakaria 55'; Guilherme 71'	Report		Stadium: Kuala Lumpur Stadium; Referee: Amirul Izwan

9 April 2019	PDRM (2)	5–2	Sarawak (2)	Selayang, Selangor
16:15 UTC+8				Stadium: Selayang Stadium

== Third round ==
The draw for the third round was held on 4 April 2019 at 15:00 involving 17 teams (1 byes, 14 won, and 2 that yet to be played on the day of the draw) that progressed from second round. Eight matches took place from 16 to 17 April 2019.

16 April 2019	Selangor (1)	1–2	Felda United (1)	Shah Alam, Selangor
21:00 UTC+8	Syahmi 55'	Report	Thiago 65'; Hadin 88'	Stadium: Shah Alam Stadium; Referee: Mat Zan Abd Wahab

16 April 2019	Kelantan United (3)	1–3	Terengganu (1)	Kota Bharu, Kelantan
21:00 UTC+8	Rozaimi 10'	Report	Shaakhmedov 51'; Tchétché 54'; Tuck 73'	Stadium: Sultan Muhammad IV Stadium; Referee: Abdul Halim Mohd Ramlan

16 April 2019	Kedah (1)	2–0	PJ City (1)	Alor Setar, Kedah
21:00 UTC+8	Renan Alves 3'; Zaquan 55'	Report		Stadium: Darul Aman Stadium; Referee: Wan Mohamad Tarmizi

16 April 2019	Penang (2)	2–4	Kuala Lumpur (1)	Georgetown, Penang
21:00 UTC+8	Makeche 48'; Sivanesan 79'	Report	Zaiful 3'; Irfan 14'; Guilherme 36' 65' (pen.)	Stadium: City Stadium; Referee: Fairuzi Mat Desa

17 April 2019	UKM (2)	0–1	Pahang (1)	Bandar Tun Razak, Kuala Lumpur
21:00 UTC+8		Report	Davies 84'	Stadium: Kuala Lumpur Stadium; Referee: Zohri Tajuddin

17 April 2019	PKNP (1)	3–2	PDRM (2)	Manjung, Perak
21:00 UTC+8	Yashir Pinto 16'; Fazrul Hazli 75'; Hafiz Ramdan 89'	Report	Patrick Wleh 23'; Fauzan Fauzi 47'	Stadium: Manjung Municipal Council Stadium; Referee: Yassin Hanapiah

17 April 2019	Johor Darul Ta'zim (1)	0–1	PKNS (1)	Larkin, Johor
21:00 UTC+8		Report	Kpah Sherman 48'	Stadium: Tan Sri Dato' Haji Hassan Yunos Stadium; Referee: Khirulazuan Kidam

17 April 2019	Jerantut (4)	1–2	Perak (1)	Jengka, Pahang
21:00 UTC+8	Firdaus Razak 45+4'	Report	Wander Luiz 75', 85'	Stadium: Tun Abdul Razak Stadium; Referee: Zamzaidi Katimin

== Quarter-finals ==
The draw for the quarter-finals onward to final was held on 18 April 2019 at 15:00 involving 8 teams that progressed from third round. The first legs were played on 30 April and 1 May, and the second legs were played on 10 and 11 May 2019.

=== Bracket ===
Quarterfinals
Terengganu FC	2	0	2
Pahang	1	4	5
PKNP FC	0	1	1
Perak	0	2	2
PKNS FC	1	1	2
Kedah	3	1	4
Kuala Lumpur	3	0	3
Felda United FC (a)	3	0	3

Semifinals
Pahang	3	0	3
Perak	1	3	4
Kedah (a)	1	2	3
Felda United FC	0	3	3

Final
Perak	0
Kedah (a.e.t.)	1

=== Summary ===
Team 1	Agg.	Team 2	1st leg	2nd leg
Terengganu (1)	2–5	Pahang (1)	2–1	0–4
PKNP (1)	1–2	Perak (1)	0–0	1–2
PKNS (1)	2–4	Kedah (1)	1–3	1–1
Kuala Lumpur (1)	3–3 (a)	Felda United (1)	3–3	0–0

=== Matches ===
1 May 2019
21:00 UTC+8

Terengganu (1)	2–1	Pahang (1)
Malik Ariff 10'; Kipré Tchétché 27'	Report	Ze Love 58'

Sultan Ismail Nasiruddin Shah Stadium, Kuala Terengganu
Referee: Zulkarnain Zakaria
10 May 2019
22:00 UTC+8

Pahang (1)	4–0	Terengganu (1)
Faisal Halim 6'; Dickson Nwakaeme 48' (pen.), 68'; Mohamadou Sumareh 74'	Report

Darul Makmur Stadium, Kuantan
Referee: Suhaizi Shukri

Pahang won 5−2 on aggregate.

30 April 2019
21:00 UTC+8

PKNP (1)	0–0	Perak (1)
	Report

Manjung Municipal Council Stadium, Manjung
Referee: Wan Mohamad Tarmizi
11 May 2019
22:00 UTC+8

Perak (1)	2–1	PKNP (1)
Ronaldo 23', 88'	Report	Giancarlo 72'

Perak Stadium, Ipoh
Referee: Fitri Maskon

Perak won 2−1 on aggregate.

30 April 2019
21:00 UTC+8

PKNS (1)	1–3	Kedah (1)
Gabriel Guerra 64'	Report	Fernando Rodríguez 14'; Jonatan Bauman 26' (pen.), 41'

Shah Alam Stadium, Shah Alam
Referee: Zamzaidi Katimin
10 May 2019
22:00 UTC+8

Kedah (1)	1–1	PKNS (1)
Jonatan Bauman 16'	Report	Azmeer Yusof 32' (o.g.)

Darul Aman Stadium, Alor Setar
Referee: Fairuzi Mat Desa

Kedah won 4−2 on aggregate.

30 April 2019
21:00 UTC+8

Kuala Lumpur (1)	3–3	Felda United (1)
Indra Putra 41', 54'; Paulo Josué 80'	Report	Azim Rahim 23', 60'; Jocinei Schad 75'

Kuala Lumpur Stadium, Bandar Tun Razak
Referee: Nafeez Abd Wahab
11 May 2019
22:00 UTC+8

Felda United (1)	0–0	Kuala Lumpur (1)
	Report

Tun Abdul Razak Stadium, Jengka
Referee: Suhaimi Mat Hassan

3–3 on aggregate. Felda United won on away goals.

== Semi-finals ==
The first legs were played on 22 June, and the second legs were played on 29 and 30 June 2019.

=== Summary ===
Team 1	Agg.	Team 2	1st leg	2nd leg
Pahang (1)	3–4	Perak (1)	3–1	0–3
Kedah (1)	3 –3 (a)	Felda United (1)	1–0	2–3

=== Matches ===
22 June 2019
21:00 UTC+8

Pahang (1)	3–1	Perak (1)
Herold Goulon 12', 90+3'; Mohamadou Sumareh 39'	Report	J.Partiban 55'

Darul Makmur Stadium, Kuantan
Referee: Zulkarnain Zakaria
29 June 2019
21:00 UTC+8

Perak (1)	3–0	Pahang (1)
Brendan Gan 35'; J.Partiban 42'; Faisal Rosli 44' (o.g.)	Report

Perak Stadium, Ipoh
Referee: Fitri Maskon

Perak won 4−3 on aggregate.

22 June 2019
21:00 UTC+8

Kedah (1)	1–0	Felda United (1)
Fernando Rodríguez 70' (pen.)	Report

Darul Aman Stadium, Alor Setar
Referee: Suhaimi Mat Hassan
30 June 2019
21:00 UTC+8

Felda United (1)	3–2	Kedah (1)
Thiago Junio 65'; S.Chanturu 72'; Hadin Azman 90+4'	Report	Fernando Rodríguez 26' (pen.); Farhan Roslan 38'

Tun Abdul Razak Stadium, Jengka
Referee: Zamzaidi Katimin

3−3 on aggregate. Kedah won on away goals

== Final ==
27 July 2019
21:00 UTC+8

Perak (1)	0–1 (a.e.t.)	Kedah (1)
		Fadzrul Danel 105+1'

Bukit Jalil National Stadium, Bukit Jalil, Kuala Lumpur
Referee: Takuto Okabe (Japan)

== Top goalscorers ==
As of 27 July 2019

Rank	Player	Club	Goals
1	(Malaysia) Fakhrul Zaman	Kelantan United	7
2	(Malaysia) Abdul Manaf Mamat	Batu Dua	6
3	(Malaysia) Hasrul Nurkholis Hasim	Penjara	5
4	(Spain) Fernando Rodríguez	Kedah	4
4	(Argentina) Jonatan Bauman	Kedah	4
4	(Malaysia) Mohd Rizua	Batu Dua	4
4	(Liberia) Patrick Wleh	PDRM	4
4	(Malaysia) Syafiq Abd Hamid	Protap	4
9	(Malaysia) Azrol Izwan Azman	Penjara	3
9	(Brazil) Giancarlo	PKNP	3
9	(Brazil) Guilherme	Kuala Lumpur	3
9	(Malaysia) Indra Putra Mahayuddin	Kuala Lumpur	3
9	(France) L'Imam Seydi	Batu Dua	3
9	(Croatia) Mateo Roskam	UKM	3
9	(Malaysia) Nor Kamali	Raja Permin FC	3
9	(Malaysia) Shahrul Hakim	Kelantan United	3
17	33 players	19 clubs	2
50	108 players	46 clubs	1

== See also ==
- 2019 Malaysia Super League
- 2019 Malaysia Premier League
- 2019 Malaysia M3 League
