= 2020 Malaysia Premier League =

Malaysia Premier League
- Season: 2020
- Dates: 29 February – 31 October 2020
- Champions: Penang; 1st title
- Promoted: Penang; Kuala Lumpur
- Matches: 66
- Goals: 191 (2.89 per match)
- Top goalscorer: Casagrande (9 goals)
- Biggest home win: Perak II 5–1 Kuching (5 September 2020)
- Biggest away win: 7 goals Selangor II 1–6 Johor Darul Ta'zim II (20 September 2020)
- Highest scoring: 9 goals Kuala Lumpur 5–4 Selangor II (25 September 2020)
- Longest winning run: 6 matches Penang
- Longest unbeaten run: 10 matches Penang
- Longest winless run: 6 matches Kuching; Kelantan United
- Longest losing run: 6 matches Kelantan United
- Total attendance: 47,974 (Note: Excluding matches played behind closed doors.)
- Average attendance: 2,821

The 2020 Malaysia Premier League was the 17th season of the Malaysia Premier League, the second-tier professional football league in Malaysia since its establishment in 2004.

The season started on 29 February and was scheduled to end on 20 July 2020. However, on 13 March, it was announced that the league would be suspended indefinitely, due to the ongoing COVID-19 pandemic. On 1 May, it was announced that the league would resume in September dependent on the pandemic situation at the time. Due to time constraints, the home-and-away format for the Super League and the Premier League was scrapped. Teams played each other only once, meaning the champions of the Super League and Premier League were decided after eleven rounds of matches.

== Team changes ==
A total of 12 teams contested the league, including 7 sides from the 2019 season, 3 relegated from the 2019 Malaysia Super League and 2 promoted from the 2019 Malaysia M3 League.

=== To Premier League ===
Relegated from Super League

- Perak II
- Selangor II^{1}
- Kuala Lumpur FA

Promoted from Liga M3

- Kelantan United
- Kuching

=== From Premier League ===
Promoted to Super League

- PDRM
- Sabah
- UiTM

Relegated to Liga M3

- Sarawak

=== Renamed/Rebranded Clubs ===
- PKNP FC was renamed as Perak FA II and designated as the reserve team of Perak FA.
- In a desperate move by Football Association of Sarawak (FAS), FAS bought Selangor United and rebranded it as Sarawak United and located to Kuching, Sarawak in an attempt to return to Malaysian Premier League and regain their "honour".

Notes:

^1 PKNS was demoted to Premier League after their absorption to Selangor, change their status as reserve team, and renamed as Selangor II. UiTM FC was promoted to Super League as replacement.

== Stadium and locations ==
Locations of teams in the 2018 Malaysia Premier League teams

Note: Table lists in alphabetical order.

Team	Location	Stadium	Capacity
Johor Darul Ta'zim II	Larkin	Tan Sri Dato Haji Hassan Yunos Stadium	30,000
Kelantan	Kota Bharu	Sultan Muhammad IV Stadium	22,000
Kelantan United	Kota Bharu	Sultan Muhammad IV Stadium	22,000
Kuala Lumpur FA	Kuala Lumpur	Kuala Lumpur Stadium	18,000
Kuching	Kuching	Sarawak Stadium	40,000
Negeri Sembilan	Seremban	Tuanku Abdul Rahman Stadium	45,000
Perak II	Manjung	Manjung Stadium	15,000
Penang	George Town	City Stadium	25,000
Sarawak United	Kuching	Sarawak Stadium	40,000
Selangor II	Selayang	Selayang Stadium	16,000
Terengganu II	Kuala Terengganu	Sultan Ismail Nasiruddin Shah Stadium	15,000
UKM	Selayang	Selayang Stadium	16,000

== Personnel and sponsoring ==
Note: Flags indicate national team as has been defined under FIFA eligibility rules. Players may hold more than one non-FIFA nationality.

Team	Head coach	Captain	Kit manufacturer	Shirt sponsor(s)
Johor Darul Ta'zim II	(Spain) Rafa Gil	(Argentina) Nico Fernandez	Nike	-
Kelantan	(Malaysia) Yusri Che Lah	(Malaysia) Nazrin Nawi	PUC Sport	After Image
Kelantan United	(Malaysia) Zahasmi Ismail	(Malaysia) Shahrizan Ismail	SkyHawk	Visit Kelantan 2020
Kuala Lumpur FA	(Malaysia) Nidzam Adzha	(Brazil) Paulo Josué	Puma	KL BACA 2020
Kuching	(Malaysia) Ideris Untong	(Malaysia) Rafiezan Razali	StarSport	Kuching
Negeri Sembilan	(Malaysia) Sazali Saidon	(Malaysia) Kaharuddin Rahman	Admiral	Visit Negeri Sembilan
Perak II	(Malaysia) Abu Bakar Fadzim	(Malaysia) Sukri Hamid	Kelme	Visit Perak (home) & Pangkor Duty Free Island (away)
Penang	(Malaysia) Manzoor Azwira	(Malaysia) Azmi Muslim	Stallion Apparel	Pulau Pinang
Sarawak United	(Malaysia) E. Elavarasan	(Malaysia) Amri Yahyah	Joma	Press Metal
Selangor II	(Malaysia) Rusdi Suparman	(Malaysia) Sharul Nazeem	Joma	PKNS
Terengganu II	(Malaysia) Roshadi Wahab	(Japan) Bruno Suzuki	Al-Ikhsan	redONE
UKM	(Malaysia) Sulaiman Hussin	(Malaysia) Asnan Ahmad	Line 7	SUKIPT

=== Coaching changes ===
Note: Flags indicate national team as has been defined under FIFA eligibility rules. Players may hold more than one non-FIFA nationality.

Team	Outgoing coach	Manner of departure	Date of vacancy	Position in table	Incoming coach	Date of appointment
Johor Darul Ta'zim II	(Croatia) Ervin Boban	End of contract	n/a	Pre-season	(Spain) Rafa Gil	9 November 2019
Selangor II	(Malaysia) K. Rajagopal	End of contract	22 November 2019	Pre-season	(Germany) Michael Feichtenbeiner	17 December 2019
Negeri Sembilan	(Malaysia) Zaki Sheikh Ahmad	End of caretaker spell	April 2019	Pre-season	(Malaysia) Sazali Saidon	19 December 2019
Terengganu II	(Malaysia) Tengku Hazman	End of contract	n/a	Pre-season	(Malaysia) Roshadi Wahab	December 2019
Sarawak United	(Malaysia) Abdul Talib Sulaiman	End of contract	n/a	Pre-season	(Malaysia) E. Elavarasan	4 February 2020

== Foreign players ==
The number of foreign players is restricted to four each team including at least one player from the AFC country.

Note: Flags indicate national team as has been defined under FIFA eligibility rules. Players may hold more than one non-FIFA nationality.

Club	Player 1	Player 2	Player 3	AFC player	Former player ^{4}
Johor Darul Ta'zim II	(Argentina) Nicolas Fernandez	(Argentina) Luis Cabrera	(Spain) Fernando Rodriguez	(Japan) Kei Hirose	
Kelantan	(Japan) Masaki Watanabe	(Nigeria) Felix Odili	(Namibia) Lazarus Kaimbi		(South Korea) Kang Seung-jo
Kelantan United	(Brazil) Aylton Alemão	(Morocco) Adil Kouskous	(The Gambia) Alfusainney Gassama	(Iraq) (Sweden) Selwan Al Jaberi	
Kuala Lumpur FA	(Brazil) Paulo Josué	(Argentina) Nicolás Dul	(Togo) Francis Koné	(Kyrgyzstan) Azamat Baimatov	
Kuching	(Brazil) Bryan Jones Anicézio	(Brazil) Hudson Jesus	(Japan) Yuta Suzuki	(Japan) Yuki Tanigawa	
Negeri Sembilan	(Brazil) Matheus Vila	(Brazil) Igor Carioca	(Brazil) Almir	(Japan) Shunsuke Nakatake	
Perak II	(Brazil) Bruno Bezerra	(France) Sacha Petshi	(Bosnia and Herzegovina) Tarik Isic	(Australia) (Turkey) Yaren Sözer	
Penang	(Brazil) Rafael Vitor	(Brazil) Endrick	(Brazil) Casagrande	(South Korea) Lee Chang-hoon	
Sarawak United	(Brazil) Demerson	(Argentina) Gabriel Guerra	(Liberia) Patrick Wleh	(Iran) Milad Zanidpour	(Argentina) Nicolás Marotta
Selangor II	(Kosovo) Bajram Nebihi			(Singapore) (Germany) Armin Maier	
Terengganu II	(Montenegro) Argzim Redžović	(Ivory Coast) Dechi Marcel	(Ghana) Jordan Mintah	(Japan) (Brazil) Bruno Suzuki	
UKM	(Ghana) Ignatius Adukor	(Argentina) Julián Bottaro	(Nigeria) Akanni-Sunday Wasiu	(South Korea) Lee Seong-woo	(Liberia) Amadaiya Rennie (France) Kevin Osei

- ^4 Foreign players who left their clubs or were de-registered from playing squad due to medical issues or other matters.

== Results ==
=== League table ===
Pos	Team	Pld	W	D	L	GF	GA	GD	Pts	Qualification or relegation
1	Penang (P)	11	8	2	1	24	8	+16	26	Promotion to Super League
2	Terengganu II (Note: Johor Darul Ta'zim II, Perak II, Selangor II and Terengganu II cannot be promoted from Malaysia Premier League and play in Malaysia Cup as Johor Darul Ta'zim F.C., Perak FA, Selangor F.C. and Terengganu FC (their parent clubs) remain in Malaysia Super League and play in Malaysia Cup. Should the team be relegated to Malaysia Premier League or will not play in Malaysia Cup, Johor Darul Ta'zim II, Perak II, Selangor II and Terengganu II will have to drop to Malaysia M3 League or will play in Malaysia Cup.)	11	7	1	3	17	14	+3	22	
3	Kuala Lumpur (P)	11	6	3	2	21	14	+7	21	Promotion to Super League
4	Kuching	11	5	1	5	17	19	−2	16	
5	Johor Darul Ta'zim II	11	4	3	4	20	17	+3	15	
6	Kelantan	11	5	3	3	14	11	+3	15 (Note: Kelantan have been docked three points following the club’s failure to comply with FIFA’s decision.)	
7	Selangor II	11	4	1	6	17	23	−6	13	
8	Kelantan United	11	4	0	7	13	19	−6	12	
9	UKM	11	3	3	5	11	17	−6	12	Withrew from Premier League and dissolved.
10	Sarawak United	11	3	2	6	14	16	−2	11	
11	Negeri Sembilan	11	3	2	6	12	20	−8	11	
12	Perak II	11	1	5	5	11	13	−2	8	

Updated to match(es) played on 31 October 2020. Source: MFL
Rules for classification: 1) Points; 2) Goal difference; 3) Number of goals scored.
(P) Promoted

=== Result table ===
Home \ Away	JDT	KEL	KLU	KUL	KUC	NSE	PRK	PEN	SUD	SEL	TFCII	UKM
Johor Darul Ta'zim II			3–2	1–1	-	-	1–1	1–2	-	-	-	-
Kelantan	-		1–1	2–0	-		1–0	0–3	1–0	-	-	-
Kelantan United	-	-		0–2	2–1	3–0	-	-	-		2–3	-
Kuala Lumpur	-		-			3–1	-	-	-	5–4	4–1	2–1
Kuching		2–0	-	-		-	-	-	2–1	1–4	1–2	1–2
Negeri Sembilan	1–3	-	-	-	2–4		-	-		2–1	1–0	2–0
Perak II	-	-	0–1		5–1	0–0		1–1	2–2	-	-	-
Penang	-	-	-	2–1	0–0	2–0			4–2	4–1		-
Sarawak United	4–1	-	2–1	1–2	-	-	-	-		-		
Selangor II	1–6	0–0	-	-	-	-	2–1	-	1–0		0–1	
Terengganu II	2–3	2–1	-	-	-	-	2–0		-	-		2–2
UKM	0–0	1–5	-	-	-	-		1–2	-	-	-	

Updated to match(es) played on 27 September 2020. Source: MFL
Legend: Blue = home team win; Yellow = draw; Red = away team win.
For upcoming matches, an "a" indicates there is an article about the rivalry between the two participants.

== Season statistics ==
=== Top scorers ===
As of matches played on 31 October 2020.

Players sorted first by goals, then by last name.

Rank	Player	Club	Goals
1	(Brazil) Casagrande	Penang	9
2	(Brazil) Endrick Santos	Penang	8
3	(Togo) Francis Koné	Kuala Lumpur	7
3	(Malaysia) Danial Asri	Selangor II	7
3	(Spain) Fernando Rodríguez	Johor Darul Ta'zim II	7
3	(Ghana) Jordan Mintah	Terengganu F.C. II	7

=== Hat-tricks ===
Player	For	Against	Result	Date
(Brazil) Casagrande	Penang	Selangor II	4 – 1 (H)	7 March 2020
(Malaysia) Hakimi Abdullah	Kelantan	UKM	1 – 5 (A)	22 August 2020
(Brazil) Endrick Santos	Penang	Kelantan	0 – 3 (A)	29 August 2020

=== Clean sheets ===
As of matches played on 25 September 2020.

Players sorted first by clean sheets, then by last name.

Rank	Player	Club	Clean sheets
1	(Malaysia) (England) Samuel Somerville	Penang	3
1	(Malaysia) Remezey Che Ros	UKM	3
1	(Malaysia) Kaharuddin Rahman	Negeri Sembilan	3
1	(Malaysia) Fikri Che Soh	Kelantan	3
4	(Malaysia) Suhaimi Hussin	Terengganu II	2
6	(Malaysia) Faridzuean Kamaruddin	Kelantan	1
6	(Malaysia) Farhan Majid	Perak II	1
6	(Malaysia) Firdaus Irman	Selangor II	1
6	(Malaysia) Haziq Nadzli	Johor Darul Ta'zim II	1
6	(Malaysia) Iqbal Suhaimi	Kuching	1
6	(Malaysia) Shahrizan Ismail	Kelantan United	1
6	(Malaysia) Sikh Izhan	Selangor II	1
6	(Malaysia) Syazwan Yusoff	Kelantan United	1
6	(Malaysia) Zamir Selamat	Kuala Lumpur	1

== See also ==
- 2020 Malaysia Super League
- 2020 Malaysia FA Cup
- 2020 Malaysia Cup
