= Adam See =

Malaysian footballer

Personal information
- Full name: Adam See Kok Luen bin Abdullah
- Date of birth: 3 June 1988 (age 38)
- Place of birth: Malacca, Malaysia
- Height: 1.71 m (5 ft 7 in)
- Position: Midfielder

Team information
- Current team: Melaka City F.C.
- Number: 27

Senior career*
Years	Team	Apps	(Gls)
2008–2010	Johor FC	18	(1)
2010–2011	Kuala Lumpur	45	(4)
2012	Kedah	18	(1)
2013	Johor Darul Ta'zim	16	(1)
2014	Johor Darul Ta'zim II	19	(5)
2015	Penang	10	(0)
2016	Melaka United	13	(2)
2017	Petaling Jaya Rangers	11	(0)
2018–2019	Selangor United	15	(1)
2020–	Melaka City F.C.	0	(0)

International career
2011	Malaysia U23	3	(0)
- * Club domestic league appearances and goals as of 23 February 2020

Adam See Kok Luen bin Abdullah, formerly known as See Kok Luen (Chinese: 冼国伦; Xiao'erjing: ﺷِﯿْﺎ ﻗُﻮَع لٍ) is a Malaysian footballer who currently plays for Melaka United FC in the 2020 Malaysia M3 League.

== Personal life ==
See was born in Jasin, Malacca on 3 June 1988. His football career started when he joined Johor FC in the Malaysia Cup. See married Norfajrina Idris at Kampung Nyalas, Jasin on May 19, 2017. Before marriage, the two practiced different religions, but See converted to Islam with the name of Adam in late January 2017 before marrying his wife.

== Career ==
Known for his peregrinating football career, Adam has traveled and played as a footballer in nine clubs in his career.

== International career ==
Adam was part of the national team for the 2011 VFF Cup, held in Vietnam.

== Career statistics ==
=== Club ===
As of 23 February 2020.

Appearances and goals by club, season and competition
Club	Season	League			Cup		League Cup		Continental		Total	
Club	Season	Division	Apps	Goals	Apps	Goals	Apps	Goals	Apps	Goals	Apps	Goals
Penang	2015	Malaysia Super League	10	0	0	0	0	0	–		10	0
Penang	Total		10	0	0	0	0	0	–		10	0
Melaka United	2016	Malaysia Premier League	13	0	1	0	1	0	–		15	0
Melaka United	Total		13	0	1	0	1	0	–		15	0
Petaling Jaya Rangers	2017	Malaysia FAM League	11	0	1	0	0	0	–		12	0
Petaling Jaya Rangers	Total		11	0	1	0	0	0	–		12	0
Selangor United	2018	Malaysia FAM League	9	1	1	0	0	0	–		10	1
Selangor United	2019	Malaysia M3 League	6	0	0	0	0	0	–		6	1
Selangor United	Total		15	1	1	0	0	0	–		16	1
Melaka United F.C.	2020	Malaysia M3 League	0	0	2	0	0	0	–		2	0
Melaka United F.C.	Total		0	0	2	0	0	0	–		2	0
Career Total			49	1	5	0	1	0	–	–	55	1

== Honours ==
Penang

- Malaysia Premier League runner-up: 2015

Melaka United

- Malaysia Premier League: 2016

Selangor United

- Malaysia FAM League runner-up: 2018

Johor Darul Ta'zim

- Malaysia FA Cup runner-up: 2013

Malaysia U23

- VFF Cup third place: 2011
