= 2020 Malaysia Super League =

Malaysia Super League
- Season: 2020
- Dates: 28 February – 31 October 2020
- Champions: Johor Darul Ta'zim; 7th Super League title 7th Liga M title
- Relegated: PDRM FA; Felda United
- AFC Champions League: Johor Darul Ta'zim
- AFC Cup: Kedah; Terengganu
- Matches: 66
- Goals: 218 (3.3 per match)
- Top goalscorer: Ifedayo Olusegun (12 goals)
- Biggest home win: 7 goals JDT 7–0 Perak (4 September 2020)
- Biggest away win: 7 goals PDRM 0–7 Selangor (3 October 2020)
- Highest scoring: 7 goals Kedah 3–4 Terengganu (7 March 2020); JDT 7–0 Perak (4 September 2020); JDT 6–1 Selangor (19 September 2020); PDRM 0–7 Selangor (3 October 2020); Selangor 6–1 Felda United (10 October 2020)
- Longest winning run: 5 matches Kedah
- Longest unbeaten run: 11 matches JDT
- Longest winless run: 11 matches PDRM
- Longest losing run: 5 matches PDRM
- Total attendance: 178,443 (matches played behind closed doors are not included)
- Average attendance: 9,914 (matches played behind closed doors are not included)

The 2020 Malaysia Super League (Malay: Liga Super Malaysia 2020), known as the CIMB Bank Liga Super Malaysia 2020 for sponsorship reasons, was the 17th season of the Malaysia Super League, the top-tier professional football league in Malaysia.

Johor Darul Ta'zim were the defending champions, having won their sixth title the previous season.

The first transfer window was from 16 January to 15 March 2020.

On 13 March 2020, it was announced that the league would be suspended indefinitely, due to the ongoing COVID-19 pandemic. On 17 July, it was announced that the league would resume in August dependent on the situation at the time. Due to time constraints, the home-and-away format has been scrapped. Teams played each other only once, meaning that the champion of the Super League was decided after eleven rounds of matches.

== Teams ==
=== Changes from last season ===
Kuala Lumpur and PKNP are relegated to the Malaysia Premier League after finishing bottom and second-bottom respectively in last season's Malaysia Super League.

Sabah and PDRM are promoted after securing their place as champions and 3rd-placed finishers in last season's Malaysia Premier League (runners-up Johor Darul Ta'zim II is ineligible for the Super League due to being the reserve team to Johor Darul Ta'zim).

As PKNS has changed their status as the reserve team to Selangor, they are therefore replaced by the 5th-placed finishers of last season's Malaysia Premier League UiTM (4th-placed finishers Terengganu II is ineligible for the Super League due to being the reserve team to Terengganu FC).

==== Team changes ====
Promoted from the 2019 Malaysia Premier League

- Sabah
- PDRM
- UiTM

Relegated to the 2020 Malaysia Premier League

- PKNS
- PKNP
- Kuala Lumpur

=== Clubs locations ===
Locations of teams in the 2020 Malaysia Super League

Team	Location	Stadium	Capacity
Felda United	Jengka	Tun Abdul Razak Stadium	25,000
Johor Darul Ta'zim	Iskandar Puteri	Sultan Ibrahim Stadium	40,000
Kedah	Alor Setar	Darul Aman Stadium	32,387
Melaka	Krubong	Hang Jebat Stadium	40,000
Pahang	Kuantan	Darul Makmur Stadium	40,000
PDRM	Kuala Lumpur	Kuala Lumpur Stadium	15,000
Perak	Ipoh	Perak Stadium	42,500
Petaling Jaya	Petaling Jaya	Petaling Jaya Stadium	25,000
Sabah	Kota Kinabalu	Likas Stadium	35,000
Selangor	Shah Alam	Shah Alam Stadium	80,372
Terengganu	Kuala Terengganu	Sultan Mizan Zainal Abidin Stadium	50,000
UiTM	Shah Alam	UiTM Stadium	10,000

== Personnel, kit and sponsoring ==
Team	Head coach	Captain	Kit manufacturer	Main sponsor
Felda United	(Malaysia) Nidzam Jamil	(Malaysia) Jasazrin Jamaluddin	FBT	Felda
Johor Darul Ta'zim	(Mexico) Benjamin Mora	(Singapore) Hariss Harun	Nike	–
Kedah	(Singapore) Aidil Sharin Sahak	(Malaysia) Baddrol Bakhtiar	Lotto	Chenang Bay
Melaka	(Malaysia) Zainal Abidin Hassan	(Malaysia) Safiq Rahim	Al-Ikhsan	Olympex
Pahang	(Malaysia) Dollah Salleh	(Nigeria) Dickson Nwakaeme	Umbro	Aras Kuasa
PDRM	(Malaysia) Ishak Kunju	(Malaysia) Safiee Ahmad	Al-Ikhsan	RedONE
Perak	(Australia) Mehmet Duraković	(Malaysia) Shahrul Saad	Kelme	Visit Perak (home) & Pangkor Duty Free Island (away)
Petaling Jaya	(Malaysia) K. Devan	(Malaysia) K. Gurusamy	Puma	Qnet
Sabah	(Indonesia) Kurniawan Dwi Yulianto	(Malaysia) Rawilson Batuil	Carino	–
Selangor	(Malaysia) B. Sathianathan	(Australia) Taylor Regan	Joma	PKNS
Terengganu	(Malaysia) Nafuzi Zain	(England) Lee Tuck	Al-Ikhsan	RedONE
UiTM	(Germany) Frank Bernhardt	(Malaysia) Afif Asyraf	Adidas (home & away) & Fitech (third)	SUKIPT

== Foreign players ==
Southeast Asia (SEA) players are required to have acquired at least 30 international caps for their senior national team with no period restriction on when they are earned while those who has less than 30 international caps will be subjected to MFL approval.

Note: Flags indicate national team as defined under FIFA eligibility rules. Players may hold more than one FIFA and non-FIFA nationality.

Team	Player 1	Player 2	Player 3	Asian Player	SEA Player	Former Players ^{1}
Felda United	(Serbia) Nikola Raspopović	(Gabon) Frédéric Bulot	(Argentina) Nicolas Velez	(Japan) Ryutaro Megumi	(Singapore) Khairul Amri	
Johor Darul Ta'zim	(Brazil) Maurício	(Brazil) Diogo	(Argentina) Leandro Velazquez	(Iraq) (Argentina) Gonzalo Cabrera	(Singapore) Hariss Harun	
Kedah	(Brazil) Renan Alves	(Ivory Coast) Kipré Tchétché	(Liberia) Kpah Sherman	(Philippines) (Sweden) Amin Nazari	(Singapore) Shakir Hamzah	
Melaka	(Colombia) Romel Morales	(Nigeria) Uche Agba	(Haiti) Sony Norde	(South Korea) Jang Suk-won		(Thailand) (England) Naruphon Wild
Pahang	(Brazil) Ivan Carlos	(France) Hérold Goulon	(Nigeria) Dickson Nwakaeme		(Philippines) (England) Adam Reed	(Lebanon) Khalil Khamis
PDRM	(Turkmenistan) Shohrat Soyunov	(Turkmenistan) Serdar Geldiyev				(Grenada) (England) Antonio German
Perak	(Brazil) Leandro	(Brazil) Careca	(Brazil) Guilherme	(Australia) Antony Golec	(Cambodia) (France) Thierry Bin	
Petaling Jaya	(Brazil) Elizeu	(Brazil) Brandão	(Guinea) Demba Camara	(South Korea) Kim Bong-jin	**(Thailand) Anawin Jujeen**	(Philippines) (England) Mark Hartmann
Sabah	(Serbia) Rodoljub Paunovic	(Namibia) Petrus Shitembi	**(France) Guy Gnabouyou**	(South Korea) Park Tae-soo	(Thailand) (Germany) Dennis Buschening	(Puerto Rico) Hector Ramos
Selangor	(Brazil) Sandro	(Nigeria) Ifedayo Olusegun	(Spain) Rufino Segovia	(Australia) Taylor Regan	(Singapore) Safuwan Baharudin	
Terengganu	(Montenegro) **Argzim Redžović**	(England) Lee Tuck	(Uzbekistan) Sanjar Shaakhmedov	(Japan) (Brazil) **Bruno Suzuki**	(Singapore) Faris Ramli	(Senegal) Babacar Diallo (Mauritania) Dominique
UiTM	(Brazil) Gustavo	(France) Victor Nirennold	(France) Ousmane Fané	(Lebanon) Rabih Ataya	**(Philippines) (England) Mark Hartmann**	

- Players name in **bold** indicates the player is registered during the mid-season transfer window.
- **^1** Foreign players who left their clubs or were de-registered from playing squad due to medical issues or other matters.

=== Naturalisation players ===
Club	Player 1	Player 2	Player 3	Player 4
Johor Darul Ta'zim	(Australia) (Malaysia) **Matthew Davies**^{3} ^{4}	(Canada) (Malaysia) **La'Vere Corbin-Ong**^{3} ^{4}	(Spain) (Malaysia) **Natxo Insa**^{3} ^{4}	(Kosovo) (Malaysia) **Liridon Krasniqi**^{4}
Kedah	(Australia) (Malaysia) David Rowley^{3}	(Japan) (Malaysia) Tam Sheang Tsung^{3}		
Melaka	(New Zealand) (Malaysia) **Khair Jefri Jones**^{3} ^{4}	(Australia) (Malaysia) Curran Singh-Ferns^{3}		
Selangor	(England) (Malaysia) Nicholas Swirad^{3}	(Australia) (Malaysia) **Brendan Gan Seng Ling**^{3} ^{4}		
Terengganu	(Scotland) (Malaysia) Stuart Wark^{3}	**(England) (Malaysia) Darren Lok Yee Deng^{3} ^{4}**		

Notes:

^3 Carrying Malaysian heritage.
^4 Participated in the Malaysia national team squad.

== League table ==
Pos	Team	Pld	W	D	L	GF	GA	GD	Pts	Qualification or relegation
1	Johor Darul Ta'zim (C, Q)	11	9	2	0	33	8	+25	29	Qualification for AFC Champions League group stage
2	Kedah (Q)	11	7	1	3	20	13	+7	22	Qualification for AFC Cup group stage
3	Terengganu (Q)	11	6	1	4	24	14	+10	19	Qualification for AFC Cup group stage
4	Perak	11	5	3	3	21	19	+2	18	
5	Selangor	11	4	5	2	26	19	+7	17	
6	UiTM	11	5	2	4	17	15	+2	17	
7	Petaling Jaya City	11	3	5	3	17	16	+1	14	
8	Pahang	11	4	2	5	18	18	0	14	
9	Melaka United	11	4	2	5	13	16	−3	11 (Note: Melaka have been docked three points following the decision from FAM.)	
10	Sabah	11	2	3	6	12	24	−12	9	
11	Felda United (R)	11	1	4	6	12	27	−15	7	Relegation to Malaysia Premier League
12	PDRM (R)	11	0	2	9	5	29	−24	−1 (Note: PDRM have been docked three points following the decision from FAM.)	Relegation to Malaysia Premier League

Source: Malaysian Football League
Rules for classification: 1) Points; 2) Goal difference; 3) Number of goals scored.
(C) Champions; (Q) Qualified for the phase indicated; (R) Relegated

== Result table ==
Home \ Away	FEL	JDT	KED	MEL	PAH	PDRM	PRK	PJC	SBH	SEL	TFC	UiTM
Felda United		–	1–2	3–2	2–2	–	–	1–1	–	–	0–3	0–1
Johor Darul Ta'zim	1–1		1–0	–	–	–	7–0	–	4–1	6–1	–	2–1
Kedah	–	–		1–0	–	–	–	2–1	3–1	2–0	3–4	–
Melaka	–	0–5	–		0–1	3–1	–	1–1	–	–	1–0	–
Pahang	–	2–3	2–1	–		2–1	3–3	–	2–0	1–2	–	–
PDRM	1–1	0–1	0–2	–	–		0–2	–	0–0	0–7	–	–
Perak	5–1	–	2–3	0–1	–	–		2–0	–	–	–	1–0
Petaling Jaya	–	2–2	–	–	3–2	4–1	–		1–1	–	0–2	–
Sabah	3–1	–	–	3–2	–	–	2–2	–		1–2	–	0–3
Selangor	6–1	–	–	1–1	–	–	1–1	0–0	–		–	3–3
Terengganu	–	0–1	–	–	2–1	4–0	1–3	–	4–0	3–3		–
UiTM	–	–	1–1	0–2	1–0	3–1	–	2–4	–	–	3–1	

Updated to match(es) played on 31 October 2020. Source: MFL
Legend: Blue = home team win; Yellow = draw; Red = away team win.
For upcoming matches, an "a" indicates there is an article about the rivalry between the two participants.

== Positions by round ==
The table lists the positions of teams after each week of matches.
In order to preserve chronological evolvements, any postponed matches are not included to the round at which they were originally scheduled, but added to the full round they were played immediately afterwards.

Team ╲ Round	1	2	3	4	5	6	7	8	9	10	11
Johor Darul Ta'zim	4	2	1	1	1	1	1	1	1	1	1
Kedah	9	10	10	8	4	3	2	2	3	2	2
Terengganu	10	7	6	3	2	2	5	6	5	4	3
Perak	1	3	2	2	3	7	3	3	2	3	4
Selangor	3	6	4	6	8	6	6	8	8	5	5
Pahang	8	9	9	4	7	8	8	7	6	6	8
UiTM	11	11	11	9	5	4	7	4	4	7	6
Melaka	2	1	3	11	6	5	4	5	7	8	9
Petaling Jaya	6	5	8	10	10	10	10	10	10	9	7
Sabah	7	4	5	5	11	11	11	11	9	10	10
Felda United	5	8	7	6	9	9	9	9	11	11	11
PDRM	12	12	12	12	12	12	12	12	12	12	12

Leader
Relegation to 2021 Premier League

Updated to match(es) played on 31 October 2020. Source:

== Season statistics ==
=== Scoring ===
- First goal of the season: 44 minutes and 51 seconds
  - (Brazil) Maurício for Johor Darul Ta'zim against Kedah (28 February 2020)
- Fastest goal in a match: 1 minute and 47 seconds
  - (Mauritania) Dominique Da Sylva for Terengganu against Kedah (7 March 2020)
- Goal scored at the latest point in a match: 94 minutes and 25 seconds
  - (Malaysia) Kogileswaran Raj for Petaling Jaya City against Pahang (6 March 2020)
- First hat-trick of the season: 80 minutes and 52 seconds
  - (Mauritania) Dominique Da Sylva for Terengganu against Kedah (7 March 2020)
- Fastest hat-trick of the season: 80 minutes and 52 seconds
  - (Mauritania) Dominique Da Sylva for Terengganu against Kedah (7 March 2020)
- Most goals scored by one player in a match: 4 goals
  - (Mauritania) Dominique Da Sylva for Terengganu against Kedah (7 March 2020)
- Widest winning margin: 7 goals
  - Johor Darul Ta'zim 7–0 Perak (4 September 2020)
- Most goals in a match: 7 goals
  - Kedah 3–4 Terengganu (7 March 2020)
  - Johor Darul Ta'zim 7–0 Perak (4 September 2020)
- Most goals in one half: 4 goals
  - Kedah vs Terengganu (7 March 2020) 2–1 at half time, 3–4 final
  - Terengganu vs Selangor (11 March 2020) 1–1 at half time, 3–3 final
- Most goals in one half by a single team: 3 goals
  - Kedah vs Terengganu (7 March 2020) 2–1 at half time, 3–4 final

=== Top goalscorers ===
Rank	Player	Club	Goals
1	(Nigeria) Ifedayo Olusegun	Selangor	12
2	(Malaysia) Shahrel Fikri	Perak	10
3	(Mauritania) Dominique Da Sylva	Terengganu	9
4	(Malaysia) Safawi Rasid	Johor Darul Ta'zim	7
4	(Ivory Coast) Kipré Tchétché	Kedah	7
4	(Iraq) Gonzalo Cabrera	Johor Darul Ta'zim	7
5	(Brazil) Gustavo Almeida dos Santos	UiTM	6
5	(Brazil) Ivan Carlos	Pahang	6
5	(England) Lee Tuck	Terengganu	6
5	(Liberia) Kpah Sherman	Kedah	6
6	(Nigeria) Uche Agba	Melaka United	5
6	(Uzbekistan) Sanjar Shaakhmedov	Terengganu	5

=== Top assists ===
Rank	Player	Club	Assists
1	(Brazil) Diogo	Johor Darul Ta'zim	8
2	(England) Lee Tuck	Terengganu	6
3	(Brazil) Sandro	Selangor	5
3	(Argentina) Leandro Velazquez	Johor Darul Ta'zim	5
3	(Brazil) Washington Brandão	Petaling Jaya City	5
3	(Malaysia) Wan Amirul Afiq	Melaka United	5

=== Hat-tricks ===
Player	For	Against	Result	Date
(Mauritania) Dominique Da Sylva ^{4}	Terengganu	Kedah	3–4 (A)	7 March 2020
(Argentina) (Syria) Gonzalo Cabrera	JDT	Perak	7–0 (H)	4 September 2020
(Malaysia) Shahrel Fikri ^{4}	Perak	Felda United	5–1 (H)	25 September 2020
(Nigeria) Ifedayo Olusegun	Selangor	Felda United	6–1 (H)	11 October 2020

Note ^{4} Player scored 4 goals

=== Clean sheets ===
Rank	Player	Club	Clean sheets
1	(Malaysia) Farizal Marlias	Johor Darul Ta'zim	4
2	(Malaysia) Khairul Fahmi Che Mat	Melaka	3
2	(Malaysia) Sharmiza Yusoff	Terengganu	3
3	(Malaysia) Hafizul Hakim	Perak	2
3	(Malaysia) Sharbinee Allawee	Pahang	2
3	(Malaysia) Khairul Azhan	Selangor	2
4	(Malaysia) Azfar Arif	UiTM	1
4	(Malaysia) Azri Ghani	Kedah	1
4	(Malaysia) Shahril Saa'ri	Kedah	1
4	(Malaysia) Bryan See	PDRM	1
4	(Malaysia) Ifwat Akmal	Kedah	1
4	(Malaysia) Nasrullah Aziz	Perak	1
4	(Malaysia) Nor Haziq	UiTM	1
4	(Malaysia) Wan Azraie	Sabah	1
4	(Malaysia) Kalamullah Al Hafiz	PJ City	1
4	(Malaysia) Rahadiazli Rahalim	Terengganu	1

=== Discipline ===
==== Player ====
- Most yellow cards: 3
  - (Singapore) Shakir Hamzah (Kedah)
  - (Malaysia) Arif Anwar (UiTM)
- Most red cards: 1
  - (Malaysia) Azalinullah Alias (Terengganu)

==== Club ====
- Most yellow cards: 11
  - Perak
- Most red cards: 1
  - Terengganu

== See also ==
- 2020 Malaysia Premier League
- 2020 Malaysia FA Cup
- 2020 Malaysia Cup

== Notes ==
1. Malaysia (MAS): Due to the COVID-19 pandemic in Malaysia, the 2020 Malaysia FA Cup was cancelled and declared null and void by the Football Association of Malaysia. The 2020 Malaysia Cup winners would originally qualify for the 2021 AFC Cup as Malaysia 2, but it was also cancelled and declared null and void. As a result, the 2020 Malaysia Super League runners-up qualified for the 2021 AFC Cup as Malaysia 2, and the third place qualified for the 2021 AFC Cup as Malaysia 3.
