= 2020 Malaysia M3 League =

Malaysia M3 League
- Season: 2020
- Champions: Championship withheld
- Matches: 20
- Goals: 60 (3 per match)
- Top goalscorer: Aguile Alex; Anianalu Chibudern (3 goals)
- Biggest home win: Harini 8–0 Thai Selangor (7 March 2020)
- Biggest away win: Ultimate 0–4 Protap (8 March 2020); Perlis United 0–4 Armed Forces (14 March 2020)
- Highest scoring: 8 goals Harini 8–0 Thai Selangor (7 March 2020)
- Longest winning run: 2 matches KT Rovers; Kuala Lumpur Rovers
- Longest winless run: 2 matches Klasiko; Northern Lions-Mahsa; IKRAM Muda; PIB; Melawati; Sarawak
- Longest losing run: 2 matches Klasiko
- All statistics correct as of 15 March 2020.

The 2020 Malaysia M3 League was supposed to be the 2nd season of Malaysia M3 League the third-tier semi-professional football league in Malaysia since its establishment in 2019 before it was suspended and abandoned due to COVID-19.

The season started on 7 March and was scheduled to conclude on 17 November 2020.

On 13 March, it was announced that the league would be suspended indefinitely due to the ongoing COVID-19 pandemic.

As a result of the COVID-19 pandemic, the season was formally abandoned on 8 June 2020, with the title being withheld and all results from being expunged: no promotion or relegation would take place.

== Establishment and format ==
This new season saw the format restructuring by the AFL. On 19 January 2020, the AFL has announced the format changes for the Malaysia M3 League and Malaysia M4 League in preparation for the transition of the amateur team to semi-professionals by 2021.

The league will kick-off with 20 teams and to be split into 2 groups, an increase of 6 teams compared to 14 teams in the previous edition. The top 12 teams with a good financial record will remain in the 2021 Malaysia M3 League while the remaining 8 teams will advance to the Malaysia M4 League which will be formed with the 4 best teams 2020 Malaysia M4 League. AFL-recognized state and private leagues, originally part of the League The 2020 Malaysia M4 League will be part of the Malaysia M5 League in 2021.

== Season Changes ==
The following teams have changed division since the 2019 season.

=== To Malaysia M3 League ===
Relegated from the Premier League

- Sarawak

Promoted from Malaysia M4 League

- KSR SAINS - Promoted by winning the 2019 Malaysia M4 League play-offs
- IKRAM Muda - Promoted by runner up the 2019 Malaysia M4 League play-offs
- Immigration - Promoted by runner up the 2019 Kuala Lumpur League
- Thai Selangor - Promoted by winning the 2019 Puchong Community League
- Klasiko - Promoted by winning the 2019 Shah Amateur League
- PIB - Promoted by winning the 2019 Shah Alam League
- Perlis United - Promoted by winning the 2019 Perlis Amateur League
- Northern Lions-Mahsa - Promoted by runner up the 2019 Perlis Amateur League

New Team

- Semarak
- Kuala Lumpur Rovers
- Melaka City ^{1}

=== From Malaysia M3 League ===
Promoted to Premier League

- Kelantan United
- Kuching

Relegated to Malaysia M4 League

- Penjara
- Tun Razak

Team withdrawal

- Johor Bahru.
- Perlis
- SAMB ^{2}

=== Renamed clubs ===
- BTK F.C. was renamed to Kuala Terengganu Rovers F.C.
- Batu Dua F.C. was renamed to Harini F.C., and relocated to Kuala Selangor.
- Langkawi Glory United F.C. was renamed to Langkawi City F.C.
- Puchong Fuerza F.C. was renamed to Manjung City F.C., and relocated to Manjung.
- DDM FC was renamed to Melawati F.C.
- Tambun Tulang F.C. was renamed to Perlis United F.C.

Notes:

^1 Melaka City fills the slot that SAMB FC left.
^2 SAMB FC withdrew from the M3 League this season and was replaced by Melaka City FC.

== Clubs locations ==
Locations of teams in the 2020 Malaysia M3 League
Kuala Lumpur

=== Venues ===
Team	Location	Stadium	Capacity
Armed Forces	Kuala Lumpur	Mindef Stadium, Kuala Lumpur	1,000
(Selangor) Harini	Kuala Selangor, Selangor	Kuala Selangor Stadium, Kuala Selangor, Selangor	10,000
(Kuala Lumpur) IKRAM Muda	Kuala Lumpur	UM Arena Stadium, Kuala Lumpur	1,000
(Putrajaya) Immigration	Putrajaya	USIM Stadium, Nilai, Negeri Sembilan	1,000
(Selangor) Klasiko	Subang Jaya, Selangor	MPSJ Stadium, Subang Jaya, Selangor	1,000
(Negeri Sembilan) KSR SAINS	Seremban, Negeri Sembilan	Tuanku Abdul Rahman Stadium, Paroi, Negeri Sembilan	45,000
Kuala Terengganu Rovers	Kuala Berang, Terengganu	Kuala Berang Mini Stadium, Kuala Berang, Terengganu	1,000
Kuala Lumpur Rovers	Kuala Lumpur	Kuala Lumpur Stadium, Kuala Lumpur	18,000
(Kedah) Langkawi City	Langkawi, Kedah	Langkawi Stadium, Langkawi, Kedah	10,000
(Perak) Manjung City	Manjung, Perak	Manjung Stadium, Manjung, Perak	15,000
(Malacca) Melaka City	Malacca City, Malacca	Hang Tuah Stadium, Malacca City, Malacca	1,000
(Selangor) Melawati	Gombak, Selangor	Sayyidina Hamzah Stadium, Gombak, Selangor	5,000
(Kuala Lumpur) Protap	Kuala Lumpur	UM Arena Stadium, Kuala Lumpur	1,000
(Perlis) Northern Lions-Mahsa	Kangar, Perlis	Tuanku Syed Putra Stadium, Kangar, Perlis	20,000
Perlis United	Kangar, Perlis	Tuanku Syed Putra Stadium, Kangar, Perlis	20,000
(Selangor) PIB	Shah Alam, Selangor	Shah Alam Mini Stadium, Shah Alam, Selangor	TBA
Sarawak	Kuching	Sarawak Stadium	40,000
(Kuala Lumpur) Semarak	Kuala Lumpur	Pulapol Football Field, Kuala Lumpur	TBA
Thai Selangor	Serdang, Selangor	UPM Stadium, Serdang, Selangor	3,000
(Kuala Lumpur) Ultimate	Kuala Lumpur	MMU Stadium, Cyberjaya, Selangor	1,000

== Personnel and sponsoring ==
Team	Head coach	Captain	Kit manufacturer	Sponsor
Armed Forces	(England) Kevin Cooper	(Malaysia) Venice Elphi	Ego Sport	
Harini	(Croatia) Dusan Momcilovic	(Malaysia) Azidan Sarudin	Harini (Made by club)	Harini
IKRAM Muda	(Malaysia) Hamdan Ibrahim	(Malaysia) Syed Adney	Kaki Jersi	
Immigration	(Malaysia) Roslan Othman	(Malaysia) Fauzi Majid	SkyHawk	Bestinet
Klasiko	(Malaysia) Albert Chung Kwai Yen	(Malaysia) Faiq Muhd Shah	Kaki Jersi	Klasiko
KSR SAINS	(Malaysia) Syed Mazlan Syed Zubir	(Malaysia) Yosri Derma Raju	Admiral	Syarikat Air Negeri Sembilan
Kuala Terengganu Rovers	(Malaysia) Azahari Salim	(Malaysia) Nor Fazly Alias	ELklasiko.my	Save the Ocean
Kuala Lumpur Rovers	(Malaysia) Nazrulerwan Makmor	(Malaysia) Hafiz Kamal	Kaki Jersi	
Langkawi City	(Chile) Nelson San Martín	(Malaysia) Sufie Noorazizan	Kaki Jersi	Berkat Hasrat Petroleum Marketing Sdn. Bhd.
Manjung City	(Malaysia) Rafae Isa	(Malaysia) Nazri Kamal	PRO Apparel	Pangkor Island & Sitiawan Perdana
Melaka City	(Malaysia) Azizan Baba	(Malaysia) Adam See	Sportsrevo	Syarikat Air Melaka
Melawati	(Malaysia) Mat Zan Mat Aris	(Malaysia) Fahrul Razi	Warrix	MFCR
Northern Lions-Mahsa	(Malaysia) Azamri Zali	(Malaysia) Ezzrul Ikmanizar	Carino	Mahsa University
Perlis United	(Malaysia) Mohd Shahabudin Kadir	(Malaysia) Azizi Matt Rose	Stallion Apparel	
PIB	(Malaysia) Mohd Shaipul Abdul Kadir	(Malaysia) Ridzuan Khamis	Amnig	
Protap	(Malaysia) Mohd Faizal Md Sood	(Malaysia) Mohd Arfiyansah Abdul Jafar	Tiki Taka Design	-
Sarawak	(Uganda) Sam Timbe	(Malaysia) Nur Areff Kamaruddin	Joma	Press Metal
Semarak	(Malaysia) Zulkhairi Mohd Zabidi	(Malaysia) Elvinson Enson	KiCKA	Pulapol KL
Thai Selangor	(Malaysia) Mat Dinos Talib	(Malaysia) Izaruddin Hashim	Jako	Kampong Boy Pomade
Ultimate	(Malaysia) Azman Adnan	(Malaysia) Fazli Zulkifli	Panzer Sports	Fit'z Ultimate Garage

=== Coaching changes ===
Note: Flags indicate national team as has been defined under FIFA eligibility rules. Players may hold more than one non-FIFA nationality.

Team	Outgoing coach	Manner of departure	Date of vacancy	Position in table	Incoming coach	Date of appointment

== Foreign players ==
Malaysia M3 League clubs can sign a maximum of four foreign players in the 2020 season, up from two as compared to 2019. However, two of them has to be 20 years old or younger on 1 January 2020.

Note: Flags indicate national team as has been defined under FIFA eligibility rules. Players may hold more than one non-FIFA nationality.

Club	Player 1	Player 2	U20 Player 1	U20 Player 2	Former player ^{1}
Armed Forces					
Harini	(Democratic Republic of the Congo) Metha Viblo Apingi	(Nigeria) Chukwu Nnabuike	(Democratic Republic of the Congo) Mendike Fukiani	(Democratic Republic of the Congo) Sammy Musemakweli	
IKRAM Muda					
Immigration	(Liberia) Francis Doe	(Nigeria) Chidubem Aniamalu Stephen			
Klasiko	(Democratic Republic of the Congo) Uzoma Victor	(Nigeria) Jamil Garba			
KSR SAINS					
Kuala Terengganu Rovers	(Senegal) Baptiste Faye				
Kuala Lumpur Rovers	(Argentina) Ezequiel Agüero	(Ivory Coast) Davy Angan			
Langkawi City	(Nigeria) Ijezie Michael	(Nigeria) Umar Etudayeabdulmajid	(Japan) Ryu Nascimento		
Manjung City					
Melaka City					
Melawati	(Senegal) Faye Jaque	(Japan) Ryohei Miyazaki			
Northern Lions-Mahsa	(Thailand) Abdulbasit Salaeh	(Thailand) Faiso Che-moh			
Perlis United	(Belgium) Jason Van Achteren	(United States) Ali Deeb			
PIB	(Japan) Kenta Kishi				
Protap	(Nigeria) Aguile Alex				
Sarawak	(Republic of the Congo) Ushindi Baraka	(Uganda) Omar Hitimana	(Republic of the Congo) Ntambwe Papy	(Uganda) Denis Amadire	
Semarak	(Ghana) Patrick Asare				
Thai Selangor					
Ultimate	(Japan) Reiya Kinoshita	(Brazil) Marcio Santos			

- Players name in **bold** indicates the player is registered during the mid-season transfer window.
- **^1** Foreign players who left their clubs or were de-registered from playing squad due to medical issues or other matters.

== League table ==
=== Group A at the time of abandonment ===
Pos	Team	Pld	W	D	L	GF	GA	GD	Pts	
1	Kuala Lumpur Rovers	2	2	0	0	5	1	+4	6	
2	Armed Forces	2	1	1	0	4	0	+4	4	
3	Langkawi City	2	1	1	0	4	2	+2	4	
4	Harini	2	1	0	1	9	3	+6	3	
5	Manjung City	2	1	0	1	2	3	−1	3	
6	Perlis United	2	1	0	1	2	5	−3	3	
7	Thai Selangor	2	1	0	1	3	9	−6	3	Club resigned and dissolved.
8	Northern Lions-Mahsa	2	0	1	1	3	4	−1	1	Club resigned and dissolved.
9	IKRAM Muda	2	0	1	1	1	3	−2	1	Club resigned and dissolved.
10	Klasiko	2	0	0	2	1	4	−3	0	Club resigned and dissolved.

Updated to match(es) played on 15 March 2020. Source: FAM, Liga Malaysia
Rules for classification: 1) Points; 2) Goal difference; 3) Number of goals scored.

=== Group B at the time of abandonment ===
Pos	Team	Pld	W	D	L	GF	GA	GD	Pts	
1	Kuala Terengganu Rovers	2	2	0	0	2	0	+2	6	Club resigned and dissolved.
2	Protap	2	1	0	1	6	4	+2	3	Club resigned and dissolved.
3	Immigration	2	1	0	1	4	3	+1	3	
4	KSR SAINS	2	1	0	1	3	2	+1	3	
5	Melaka City	2	1	0	1	2	3	−1	3	Club resigned and dissolved.
6	Semarak	2	1	0	1	2	3	−1	3	Club resigned and dissolved.
7	Ultimate	2	1	0	1	3	5	−2	3	
8	PIB	2	0	2	0	2	2	0	2	
9	Sarawak	2	0	1	1	2	3	−1	1	Club resigned and dissolved.
10	Melawati	2	0	1	1	0	1	−1	1	Club resigned and dissolved.

Updated to match(es) played on 15 March 2020. Source: FAM, Liga Malaysia
Rules for classification: 1) Points; 2) Goal difference; 3) Number of goals scored.

=== Result table ===
==== Group A ====
Home \ Away	AFC	HAR	IKR	KLA	KLR	LCT	MCT	NLF	PLU	TSE
Armed Forces		–	–	–	–	–	–	–	–	–
Harini	–		–	–	–	–	–	–	–	8–0
IKRAM Muda	0–0	–		–	–	–	–	–	–	–
Klasiko	–	–	–		–	–	1–2	–	–	–
Kuala Lumpur Rovers	–	3–1	–	–		–	–	–	–	–
Langkawi City	–	–	–	2–0	–		–	2–2	–	–
Manjung City	–	–	–	–	0–2	–		–	–	–
Northern Lions-Mahsa	–	–	–	–	–	–	–		1–2	–
Perlis United	0–4	–	–	–	–	–	–	–		–
Thai Selangor	–	–	3–1	–	–	–	–	–	–	

Updated to match(es) played on 15 March 2020. Source: AFL
Legend: Blue = home team win; Yellow = draw; Red = away team win.
For upcoming matches, an "a" indicates there is an article about the rivalry between the two participants.

==== Group B ====
Home \ Away	IMI	KSR	KTR	MCFC	MEL	PIB	PRO	SWK	SEM	ULT
Immigration		–	–	–	–	–	4–2	–	–	–
KSR SAINS	–		–	–	–	–	–	–	0–1	–
Kuala Terengganu Rovers	1–0	–		–	1–0	–	–	–	–	–
Melaka City	–	1–3	–		–	–	–	–	–	–
Melawati	–	–	–	–		0–0	–	–	–	–
PIB	–	–	–	–	–		–	2–2	–	–
Protap	–	–	–	–	–	–		–	–	–
Sarawak	–	–	–	0–1	–	–	–		–	–
Semarak	–	–	–	–	–	–	–	–		1–3
Ultimate	–	–	–	–	–	–	0–4	–	–	

Updated to match(es) played on 15 March 2020. Source: AFL
Legend: Blue = home team win; Yellow = draw; Red = away team win.
For upcoming matches, an "a" indicates there is an article about the rivalry between the two participants.

== Season statistics ==
=== Top scorers ===
As of matches played on 15 March 2020.

Players sorted first by goals, then by last name.

Rank	Player	Club	Goals
1	(Nigeria) Aguile Alex	Protap	3
1	(Nigeria) Anianalu Chibudern	Immigration	3
3	(Nigeria) Ijezie Michael	Langkawi City	2
3	(Malaysia) Izzat Ikmal	Kuala Lumpur Rovers	2
3	(Malaysia) Khaizil Jasmi	KSR SAINS	2
3	(Malaysia) Raslam Khan	Harini	2
3	(Malaysia) Rizzham Norman	Thai Selangor	2
3	(Malaysia) Syukor Azmi	Perlis United	2
9	41 players	18 clubs	1

=== Hat-tricks ===
Player	For	Against	Result	Date
(Nigeria) Anianalu Chibudern	Immigration	Protap	4 – 2 (H)	15 March 2020

Notes

^{4} Player scored 4 goals
^{5} Player scored 5 goals
(H) – Home team
(A) – Away team

== See also ==
- 2020 Malaysia Super League
- 2020 Malaysia Premier League
- 2020 Malaysia M4 League
- 2020 Malaysia FA Cup
- 2020 Malaysia Cup
- 2020 Malaysia Challenge Cup
- 2020 Piala Presiden
- 2020 Piala Belia
- List of Malaysian football transfers 2020
