= Singa Muda Perlis F.C. =

Malaysian football club

Singa Muda Perlis
- Full name: Singa Muda Perlis
- Nickname(s): Victorious Young Lions
- Founded: 2016; 9 years ago
- Ground: Tuanku Syed Putra Stadium
- Capacity: 20,000
- Owner: Government of Perlis
- Head coach: Azizul Abidin
- League: Piala Belia
| Home colours | Away colours |

Singa Muda Perlis, also known as Victorious Young Lions, is a Malaysian developmental football club based in Kangar, Perlis. They last played in a youth competition for under-18 players, the Piala Belia.

== History ==
Founded in 2016 as youth team of Perlis United F.C., Northern Lions made club debut by joining the fourth-tier league, 2019 Perlis Amateur League. They lost in the final to Tambun Tulang. The team joined the 2020 Malaysia M3 League and first participated in the 2020 Malaysia FA Cup competition.

== Players ==
=== First-team squad ===
As of 1 March 2024

Note: Flags indicate national team as defined under FIFA eligibility rules; some limited exceptions apply. Players may hold more than one non-FIFA nationality.

| No. | Pos. | Nation | Player |
|---|---|---|---|
| 1 | GK | (Malaysia) MAS | Aniq Najmi |
| 2 | DF | (Malaysia) MAS | Nazirul Nazim |
| 3 | DF | (Malaysia) MAS | Faizal Sulaiman |
| 4 | DF | (Malaysia) MAS | Azril Hafidz |
| 5 | DF | (Malaysia) MAS | Adib Irfan |
| 6 | MF | (Malaysia) MAS | Uzair Haziq |
| 7 | DF | (Malaysia) MAS | Adib Iqbal |
| 8 | FW | (Malaysia) MAS | Syazmi Hamzi |
| 9 | FW | (Malaysia) MAS | Iqram Iman |
| 10 | MF | (Malaysia) MAS | Afiq Shazwan |
| 11 | DF | (Malaysia) MAS | Faris Asyraf |

| No. | Pos. | Nation | Player |
|---|---|---|---|
| 12 | FW | (Malaysia) MAS | Fadhlil Wafi |
| 13 | MF | (Malaysia) MAS | Aril Aiman |
| 14 | MF | (Malaysia) MAS | Afif Muharam |
| 15 | FW | (Malaysia) MAS | Hariz Sulhi |
| 16 | FW | (Malaysia) MAS | Arash Hashim |
| 17 | FW | (Malaysia) MAS | Danish Hazran |
| 18 | MF | (Malaysia) MAS | Amir Ashraff |
| 19 | FW | (Malaysia) MAS | Adam Haiqal |
| 20 | GK | (Malaysia) MAS | Luqman Nurhakeem |
| 22 | DF | (Malaysia) MAS | Alif Hakimi |
| 23 | FW | (Malaysia) MAS | Alexson |
| 24 | FW | (Malaysia) MAS | Amriel Nu'man |
| 25 | FW | (Malaysia) MAS | Irfan Khairi |
| 29 | MF | (Malaysia) MAS | Muhaimin Sultan |

== Club staff ==
- Manager: Noor Amin Ahmad
- Head coach: Azizul Abidin
- Assistant coach: Wan Irhandy Effendy
- Goalkeeping coach: Kamarulzaman Bin Senawi
- Fitness coach: Azhar Bin Razak
- Physio: Norhisham Bin Rosli

== Season by season record ==
| Season | Division | Position | Malaysia Cup | Malaysian FA Cup | Malaysian Charity Shield | Regional | Top scorer (All competitions) |
|---|---|---|---|---|---|---|---|
| 2019 | Liga M4 | Runners-up | DNQ | DNQ | – | – | |
| 2020^{1} | Liga M3 | Season abandoned | | Preliminary round | – | – | None |

Notes:'

^1 2020 season cancelled due to the COVID-19 pandemic

== Honours ==
=== League ===
- Perlis Amateur League
  - Runners-up (1): 2019

== See also ==
- Malaysia national football team
- Malaysia national under-23 football team
- Harimau Muda A
- Harimau Muda B
- Harimau Muda C
- LionsXII
- FAM-MSN Project
- National Football Development Programme of Malaysia
- Football Association of Perlis
