= Ishak Kunju =

Malaysian footballer and coach

Personal information
- Full name: Mohamad Ishak bin Kunju Mohamad
- Place of birth: Kuala Lumpur, Malaysia
- Position: Defender

Team information
- Current team: KL CITY (Assistan Head coach)

Senior career*
Years	Team	Apps	(Gls)
1990-1994	KL FA		
1996–1997	Terengganu		
1998-1999	NEGERI SEMBILAN CHEMPAKA		

Managerial career
- 2009: Air Panas
- 2013–2015: Kuala Lumpur (youth team)
- 2016–2017: PDRM (youth team)
- 2018: Marcerra United
- 2019–: PDRM
- 2021: ATM (A1)
- 2022: NEGERI SEMBILAN (TD)
- 2023: NEGERI SEMBILAN (U23)
- 2024-2025: NEGERI SEMBILAN (U23) (Head coach)
- 2025-2026: BUNGA RAYA (A1)(Head coach) ]]
- * Club domestic league appearances and goals as of 13 February 2018

Mohamad Ishak bin Kunju Mohamad is a Malaysian former footballer and current head coach of PDRM.
