= Zé Eduardo =

Zé Eduardo or José Eduardo may refer to:

- Zé Eduardo (footballer, born 1987), real name José Eduardo Bischofe de Almeida, Brazilian footballer
- Zé Eduardo (footballer, born 1991), real name José Eduardo de Araújo, Brazilian footballer
- Zé Eduardo (footballer, born 1999), real name José Eduardo de Andrade, Brazilian footballer
- José Eduardo (footballer, born 1981), Portuguese football goalkeeper
