= Melaka City F.C. =

Malaysian football club

Melaka City
- Full name: Melaka City Football Club
- Nickname: The Young Mousedeer
- Short name: MCFC
- Founded: 2020; 6 years ago
- Dissolved: 2021; 5 years ago
- Ground: Hang Tuah Stadium
- Capacity: 1,000
- Owner: Damian Yeo Shen Li
- Head coach: Azizan Baba
- League: Malaysia M3 League
- 2020: Season abandoned
Home colours	Away colours

Melaka City Football Club was a Malaysian football club based in Malacca City, Malacca. The club competed in the Malaysia M3 League, the third tier of the Malaysian football league system, during the 2020 season before dissolving in 2021.

== History ==
Melaka City F.C. was established in January 2020 to fill the vacant slot left by SAMB F.C., which withdrew from the 2020 Malaysia M3 League prior to the start of the campaign. Operated as a developmental side for Melaka United F.C., the club was nicknamed The Young Mousedeer and played its home matches at the 1,000-capacity Hang Tuah Stadium.

=== 2020 Liga M3 season ===
For the restructured 2020 Malaysia M3 League, Melaka City was drawn into Group B under head coach Azizan Baba and club captain Adam See, with kits manufactured by Sportsrevo and sponsored by Syarikat Air Melaka.

The league kicked off on 7 March 2020, with Melaka City playing two matches an away victory against Sarawak FA (1–0) and a home defeat to KSR SAINS F.C. (1–3) before the competition was suspended indefinitely on 13 March 2020 due to the COVID-19 pandemic in Malaysia. On 8 June 2020, the Amateur Football League (AFL) formally abandoned the season, expunging all results with no title awarded and no promotion or relegation taking place.

== Players (2020) ==
Note: Flags indicate national team as defined under FIFA eligibility rules; some limited exceptions apply. Players may hold more than one non-FIFA nationality.

No.	Pos.	Nation	Player
1	GK	MAS	Mohd Fuad Ishak
4	DF	MAS	Ikhmal Roslan
5	DF	MAS	Raja Ahmad Syazwan
6	DF	MAS	Alif Najmi Zaini
7	MF	MAS	Amarudin Azman
8	FW	MAS	Amirul Syafiq Abdul Rahim
9	FW	MAS	Aizuddin Che Aziz
10	FW	MAS	Iskandar Hanapiah
12	DF	MAS	Sharin Maznan
13	DF	MAS	Aliff Danial Hsahim
16	DF	MAS	Amiroul Syammim Yusof
17	MF	MAS	Syahir Naim Iskak
18	GK	MAS	Fahmie Hanapiah

No.	Pos.	Nation	Player
19	FW	MAS	Amin Khamis
20	MF	MAS	Samsulfais Ahmad
21	MF	MAS	Awangku Hamirullizam
22	MF	MAS	Nazirul Ahmad Nazaruddin
23	GK	MAS	Syafizullah Wahab
24	DF	MAS	Ikram Zainal
25	MF	MAS	Zulkarnain Nasir
26	DF	MAS	Lee Yong Cheng
27	MF	MAS	Adam See (captain)
28	MF	MAS	Yusri Muhammad
29	MF	MAS	Shahmim Maznan
35	FW	MAS	Shahrul Fadhli Zamri

== Season by season record ==
Season	Division	Position	Malaysia Cup	Malaysian FA Cup	Malaysian Charity Shield	Regional	Top Scorer (All competitions)
2020^{1}	Liga M3	Season abandoned	DNQ	Preliminary round	–	–	

Notes:'

^1 2020 season cancelled due to the 2020 Coronavirus Pandemic, no promotion or league title was awarded

== Management and coaching staff ==
Position	Name
Owner	Damian Yeo Shen Li
Head coach	Azizan Baba

== Season-by-season record ==
Season	Division	Position	Malaysia Cup	Malaysia FA Cup	Top scorer (All competitions)
2020	Liga M3	Season abandoned (Note: The 2020 season was cancelled due to the COVID-19 pandemic in Malaysia; all results were expunged and no title or promotion was awarded.)	DNQ	Preliminary round	—
