= Protap F.C. =

Malaysian football club

Protap
- Full name: Protap Football Club
- Founded: 2017; 9 years ago
- Dissolved: 2022
- Ground: UM Arena
- Capacity: 1,000
- Chairman: Muhd Wafaa bin Abdul Hapiz
- Coach: Mohd Faizal Md Sood
- League: Liga M3
- 2020: Liga M3 (season abandoned)

Protap Football Club was a football club based in Kuala Lumpur, Malaysia. They last played in the third-tier division in Malaysian football, the Malaysia M3 League. The club homeground has been the 1,000-seater UM Arena.

== History ==
Protap Football Club was founded in 2017 in Klang Valley, and participated in several local competitions. Protap had their first major success in the 2017 season, when they won the Klang Valley League Division 1. On 17 February 2019, the club competed in the Malaysia FA Cup for the first time.

== Players (2020) ==
=== First-team squad ===
As of 19 March 2020

Note: Flags indicate national team as defined under FIFA eligibility rules; some limited exceptions apply. Players may hold more than one non-FIFA nationality.

No.	Pos.	Nation	Player
1	GK	MAS	Faqrul Hakimi Sharuddin
2	DF	MAS	Ridzuan Azly Hussham
3	DF	MAS	Naufal Na'im
4	DF	MAS	Azhar Osman
5	DF	MAS	Khairi Mustaffa
7	MF	MAS	Lukman Hakim Mohd Azli
8	FW	MAS	Najib Abdullah
9	FW	MAS	Rahizi Rasib
10	MF	MAS	Farhanuzi Che Sanuzi
11	MF	MAS	Afzal Akbar
12	DF	MAS	Dzaiddin Zainudin
13	MF	MAS	Ammar Ruslan
14	MF	MAS	Syahirul Rodi

No.	Pos.	Nation	Player
15	MF	MAS	Razman Razuki
16	MF	MAS	Zul Hilmi Zaki
17	DF	MAS	Arfiyansah Abdul Jafar (captain)
18	MF	MAS	Ahyad Rohaizat
19	FW	MAS	Nasrullah Zainal
20	FW	NGR	Aguile Josue Alex
22	GK	MAS	Adam Zairi Fitri Zaini
25	GK	MAS	Redzuan Harun
27	DF	MAS	Amirunzakwan Roslisam
29	MF	MAS	Adhar Husin
21	MF	MAS	Khairul Afif bin Rosdee

== Club personnel (2020) ==
- Team manager: Mohammed Hafeez Ahmad Mahmud
- Head coach: Mohd Faizal Md Sood
- Assistant coach: vacant
- Goalkeeping coach: vacant
- Fitness coach: vacant
- Physio: Muhammad Afif Ishak

== Season-by-season record ==
Updated on 8 June 2020

Season	Division	Position	Malaysia Cup	Malaysian FA Cup	Malaysian Charity Shield	Regional	Top Scorer (All Competitions)
2019	Liga M3	6th of 14	DNQ	Second round	–	–	(Democratic Republic of the Congo) Metha Viblo Apingi (12)
2020^{1}	Liga M3	Season abandoned	DNQ	DNQ	–	–	None

Notes:'

^1 2020 Season cancelled due to the 2020 Coronavirus Pandemic, no promotion or league title was awarded

== Honours ==
=== League ===
- Klang Valley League Division 1

(gold) Winners (1): 2017

- Shah Alam League

(gold) Winners (1): 2018
