= Perlis United F.C. =

Malaysian football club

Perlis United
- Full name: Perlis United Football Club
- Nickname: The Rising Star
- Short name: Perlis
- Founded: 2002; 24 years ago as KSK Tambun Tulang
- Dissolved: 2024
- Ground: Tuanku Syed Putra Stadium
- Capacity: 20,000

Perlis United Football Club, simply known as Perlis United, was a Malaysian professional football club based in Kangar, Perlis.

== Background ==
KSK Tambun Tulang was formed on 18 April 2003 to oversee footballing activities throughout the state of Perlis. Although a formal association was formed in 2003, Tambun Tulang has actually had a football team since 2002. In 2020, KSK Tambun Tulang was renamed as Perlis United and competed in the Malaysia M3 League.

== Honours ==
=== Domestic competitions ===
- Malaysia FAM League

(silver) Runners-up (1): 2009

- Perlis Amateur League

(gold) Winners (1): 2019

== See also ==
- Singa Muda Perlis F.C.
- Football Association of Perlis
