= Kuala Terengganu Rovers F.C. =

Malaysian football club

KT Rovers
- Full name: Kuala Terengganu Rovers Football Club
- Nickname: The Ocean
- Short name: KT Rovers
- Founded: 1984; 42 years ago
- Dissolved: 2021
- Ground: Kuala Berang Stadium
- Capacity: 1,000
- Owner: Abdul Nawaf Fadil Zahrul
- President: Zaiful Ismail Abdul Nawaf
- Head Coach: Azahari Salim
- League: Malaysia M3 League
- 2020: Malaysia M3 League (season abandoned)

Kuala Terengganu Rovers Football Club, popularly known as KT Rovers, was a Malaysian football club based in Kuala Terengganu, Terengganu. They last played in the third-tier Malaysia M3 League. The club was also involved in the Malaysia FA Cup.

== History ==
The club was founded in 1984 in Kuala Terengganu, Terengganu and participated in several competitions in Kuala Terengganu. In 2018, the club has won the Terengganu Amateur League and been eligible to compete in the Malaysia M3 League.

On 17 February 2019, the club competed in the Malaysia FA Cup for the first time in the club's history. Starting from 2020 season, the club has been rebranded to Kuala Terengganu Rovers Football Club as an effort to bring in local area support.

== Players (2020) ==
Note: Flags indicate national team as defined under FIFA eligibility rules; some limited exceptions apply. Players may hold more than one non-FIFA nationality.

No.	Pos.	Nation	Player
1	GK	MAS	Amiruddin Azha Zulkifli
2	DF	MAS	Sukri Faiz Abdullah
3	DF	MAS	Nor Fazly Alias (captain)
4	DF	MAS	Muhd Firdaus Yusof
5	MF	MAS	Hasbullah Awang
6	MF	MAS	Amirul Dzulkarnaian
7	MF	MAS	Zarulizwan Mazlan
8	FW	MAS	Asysham Asri
9	MF	MAS	Zuhairi Ismail
11	MF	MAS	Hakimi Nuwawi
13	DF	MAS	Shafiq Haiqal Abdul Kadir
15	MF	MAS	Azuhal Aiman
16	DF	MAS	Rizal Che Aziz
17	FW	MAS	Saiful Nizam Abdullah
18	FW	MAS	Hakimi Mazalan

No.	Pos.	Nation	Player
19	FW	MAS	Ros Mohd Muharam Wahab
21	MF	MAS	Wafiuddin Al Amin Ismadi
22	FW	MAS	Adli Rahman
23	DF	MAS	Hassan Basri Abbas
24	DF	MAS	Shafiquddin Ibrahim
25	GK	MAS	Syahmi Yunof
26	MF	MAS	Wab Adib Farhan
27	MF	MAS	Shahimi Khairuddin
29	FW	MAS	Haikal Zuki
31	MF	MAS	Zul Fahmi Zunaidi
32	FW	SEN	Baptiste Faye
33	GK	MAS	Redzuan Ghazali

== Season by season record ==
Updated on 8 June 2020

Season	Division	Position	Malaysia Cup	Malaysian FA Cup	Malaysian Charity Shield	Regional	Top scorer (all competitions)
2019	Liga M3	7th of 14	DNQ	First round	–	–	(Malaysia) Ros Mohd Muharam (12)
2020^{1}	Liga M3	Season abandoned	DNQ	DNQ	–	–	

Notes:'

^1 2020 Season cancelled due to the 2020 Coronavirus Pandemic, no promotion or league title was awarded although this is now subject to a possible legal challenge

== Honours ==
=== Domestic competitions ===
==== Cups ====
- TAL Cup

Winners (1): 2018
