= Malaysia A1 Semi-Pro League =

Malaysian football league

A1 Semi-Pro League
- Organising body: Malaysian Football League (MFL)
- Founded: 13 January 2019; 7 years ago
- Country: Malaysia
- Confederation: AFC
- Number of clubs: 14
- Level on pyramid: 2
- Promotion to: Malaysia Premier League (2019–2022); Malaysia Super League (2023–present)
- Relegation to: Malaysia A2 Amateur League
- Domestic cup(s): Malaysia FA Cup; Malaysia Cup; MFL Challenge Cup
- Current champions: Johor Darul Ta'zim II (1st title) (2025–26)
- Most championships: Kelantan United; PIB Shah Alam; Immigration; Melaka; Johor Darul Ta'zim II (1 title each)
- Broadcaster: Astro Arena (selected matches)
- Website: https://the-afl.my/
- Current: 2026–27 Malaysia A1 Semi-Pro League

The Malaysia A1 Semi-Pro League (Malay: Liga A1 Semi-Pro Malaysia, previously known as the Malaysia M3 League and the MBSB Bank Championship due to sponsorship reasons) is the second level football league of the Malaysian football league system. It was created as the Malaysian Football League's reform of the domestic structure and replacement of the Malaysia FAM League.

== History ==
In 2018, the Malaysia M3 League was supposed to form the fourth division of the Malaysian football. However, the Football Association of Malaysia announced it as a replacement for the Malaysia FAM League to form the third division. After rebranding of the Football Malaysia Limited Liability Partnership (FMLLP) to the Malaysian Football League (MFL), the company announced a reform of the lower league competitions. In 2019, a new subsidiary known as the Amateur Football League (AFL), was formed. The AFL officially confirmed the formation of the Malaysia M3 League and the Malaysia M4 League as the third and fourth divisions.

A total of 14 clubs were confirmed to compete in the inaugural season of the newly reformed third division, with the Malaysia M3 League replacing the former Malaysia FAM League. Qualified champions from the 5 FA state leagues and 9 social leagues in 2018 were promoted to the inaugural 2019 Malaysia M3 League season. For the 2020 season, the Malaysia M3 League was divided into two groups of 10 clubs. At the end of the season, the top club from each group was promoted to the Malaysia Premier League. This however did not happen because of the cancellation of the 2020 season due to the COVID-19 pandemic, and was declared null and void. For the 2021 season, the AFL announced format changes in preparation for more participating teams to become professional by 2022. However, due to the pandemic, AFL postponed the start of the season to late 2021, before cancelling it altogether.

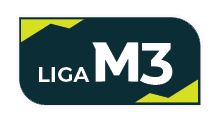
Logo used from 2019 to 2022

Logo used until the end of the 2024–25 season

=== Number of clubs throughout the years ===
Period	No. of clubs
2019	14
2020–2022	20
2023	14
2024–2025	15
2025–2026	16
2026–present	14

== Clubs (2026–27) ==
Note: This list is provisional and could be subject to changes via official sources.

#	Club	Previous season	First season	Number of seasons	Titles	Last title
1	(Selangor) AAK-UNISEL	A2 League, semi-finalist	2026–27	1	0	–
2	Armed Forces	8th	2019	7	0	–
3	(Negeri Sembilan) Bunga Raya	12th	2024–25	3	0	–
4	(Putrajaya) Immigration II	10th	2025–26	2	0	–
5	Johor Darul Ta'zim II	1st, champions	2025–26	2	1	2025–26
6	Kedah FA	3rd	2025–26	2	0	–
7	Kelantan City	7th	2025–26	2	0	–
8	Malaysian University	11th	2022	5	0	–
9	(Perak) Manjung City	9th	2019	7	0	–
10	Negeri Sembilan II	Transfer from Piala Presiden	2026–27	1	0	–
11	Perak FA	5th	2025–26	2	0	–
12	Selangor II	2nd, runners-up	2025–26	2	0	–
13	(Kuala Lumpur) UM-Damansara United	6th	2025–26	2	0	–
14	(Penang) USM	A2 League, runners-up	2026–27	1	0	–

== Former clubs ==
Below are the records of clubs that have played in the A1 League since it was established in 2019. Clubs in bold are in the Malaysia Super League as of the 2026–27; clubs in italic no longer exist.

Club	Joined	Final season	Best result
(Perak) BRM Kuala Kangsar	2022	2023	3rd (2022)
(Penang) Bukit Tambun	2022	2024–25	4th (2023)
(Selangor) Gombak	2024–25	2024–25	7th (2024–25)
(Selangor) Harini	2019	2024–25	3rd (2023)
(Kuala Lumpur) IKRAM Muda	2020	2020	Season abandoned
(Putrajaya) **Immigration**	2020	2024–25	Champions (2023)
Johor Bahru	2019	2019	11th (2019)
**Kelantan Red Warrior**	2025–26	2025–26	4th(2025–26)
Kelantan United	2016 (FAM League)	2019	Champions (2019)
(Kelantan) Kijang Rangers	2022	2022	10th (2022)
(Sabah) Kinabalu Jaguar	2022	2022	Quarter-final (2022)
(Selangor) Klasiko	2020	2020	Season abandoned
Kuala Terengganu Rovers	2019	2020	7th (2019)
Kuala Lumpur Rovers	2020	2024–25	Runners-up (2022, 2023)
(Sarawak) **Kuching**	2017 (FAM League)	2019	Runners-up (2019)
(Kedah) Langkawi	2022	2022	10th (2022)
(Kedah) Langkawi City	2019	2022	8th (2022)
(Sarawak) Machan	2024–25	2025–26	14th (2024–25)
(Malacca) **Melaka**	2023	2024–25	Champions (2024–25)
(Malacca) Melaka City	2020	2020	Season abandoned
(Kuala Lumpur) Melawati	2019	2020	8th (2019)
(Selangor) Naga UKS	2019	2023	5th (2019)
(Perlis) NLFC-MAHSA	2020	2020	Season abandoned
(Malaysia) Penjara	2019	2019	13th of 14 (2019)
Perlis GSA	2025–26	2025–26	14th (2025–26)
Perlis United	2020	2023	8th (2023)
(Selangor) PIB Shah Alam	2020	2024–25	Champions (2022)
(Putrajaya) PT Athletic	2024–25	2024–25	6th (2024–25)
(Selangor) Protap	2019	2020	14 (2019)
(Terengganu) Real Chukai	2022	2022	9th (2022)
(Perak) Respect	2022	2022	7th (2022)
(Negeri Sembilan) SAINS	2020	2023	5th (2023)
(Malacca) SAMB	2019	2019	9th(2019)
Sarawak	2020	2020	Season abandoned
Sarawak United	2023	2023	12th (2023)
(South Korea) Seoul Phoenix	2025–26	2025–26	13th (2025–26)
(Kuala Lumpur) Semarak	2020	2020	Season abandoned
Thai Selangor	2020	2020	Season abandoned
(Kelantan) Tok Janggut Warriors	2022	2022	8th (2022)
(Kuala Lumpur) Tun Razak City	2019	2022	9th (2022)
(Selangor) UiTM United	2024–25	2024–25	13th (2024–25)
(Pahang) YPM	2024–25	2024–25	10th (2024–25)

== Champions, runners-up, third places ==
Year	Champion	Runner-up	Third place
2019	Kelantan United	(Sarawak) Kuching	Armed Forces
2020	Cancelled due to the COVID-19 pandemic		
2021	Not held		
2022	(Selangor) PIB Shah Alam	Kuala Lumpur Rovers	(Putrajaya) Immigration (Perak) BRM FC
2023	(Putrajaya) Immigration	Kuala Lumpur Rovers	(Selangor) Harini
2024–25	(Malacca) Melaka	(Putrajaya) Immigration	Kuala Lumpur Rovers
2025–26	Johor Darul Ta'zim II	Selangor II	Kedah FA

== Performance by club ==
No.	Club	Champions	Runners-up
1	(Putrajaya) Immigration	1 (2023)	1 (2024–25)
2	Kelantan United	1 (2019)	—N/a
3	(Selangor) PIB Shah Alam	1 (2022)	—N/a
4	(Malacca) Melaka	1 (2024–25)	—N/a
5	Johor Darul Ta'zim II	1 (2025–26)	—N/a
6	Kuala Lumpur Rovers	—N/a	2 (2022, 2023)
7	(Sarawak) Kuching	—N/a	1 (2019)
8	Selangor II	—N/a	1 (2025–26)

== Awards, Records and achievements ==
=== Prize money ===
The 2025–26 season, the distribution of the prize money is as follows.

- Winner: RM 200,000
- Runner-up: RM 50,000

=== Golden boot winners ===
Below is the list of golden boot winners of the league since its inception in 2019.

Season	Player	Club	Goals
2019	(Malaysia) Fakhrul Zaman	Kelantan United	28
2022	(Malaysia) Firdaus Azizul	Immigration	22
2023	(Malaysia) Azim Rahim	Immigration	24
2024–25	(Malaysia) Azim Rahim	Melaka	22
2025–26	(Cameroon) Emmanuel Mbarga	Kelantan Red Warrior	32

== Foreign players ==
- 2019: 2 foreign players
- 2020: 4 foreign players, including 2 U20
- 2021–2023: foreign players banned
- 2024–25: 2 U21 foreign players
- 2025–: 3 foreign players

== See also ==
- FAM Football Awards
- History of Malaysian football
- Expatriate footballers in Malaysia
- List of foreign Malaysian League players
- Football in Malaysia
