= 2022 Malaysia M3 League =

Malaysia M3 League
- Season: 2022
- Champions: PIB Shah Alam
- Relegated: Langkawi City F.C. Tun Razak City F.C. FC Langkawi; Tok Janggut Warriors FC; Real Chukai F.C. Kijang Rangers FC
- Matches: 180
- Goals: 629 (3.49 per match)
- Top goalscorer: Firdaus Azizul (19 goals)
- Biggest home win: Armed Forces 15–0 Langkawi City (6 August)
- Biggest away win: Tun Razak City 2–7 Imegresen FC (28 May); Ultimate 0–6 ATM FC (15 July); Ultimate 0–6 Manjung City F.C. (29 July)
- Highest scoring: Tun Razak City 2–7 Imegresen FC (28 May)
- Longest unbeaten run: 11 matches Kinabalu Jaguar F.C.
- All statistics correct as of 7 August 2022.

The 2022 Malaysia M3 League season was the 2nd edition of the third tier Malaysia M3 League annual football league staged in Malaysia, since its establishment in 2019. The originally scheduled 2nd edition was cancelled twice due to the complications from COVID-19 and restrictions. 20 teams entered to contest starting on 12 February and ending on 24 September 2022.

PIB pursued their 2022 title on 24 September in Kuala Lumpur Stadium, Cheras against Kuala Lumpur Rovers, 5–3 on penalties. 2117 attended.

== Establishment and format ==
This new season saw the format restructuring by the Amateur Football League (AFL). On 19 January 2020, the AFL had announced the format changes for the Malaysia M3 League and Malaysia M4 League in preparation for the transition of the amateur team to semi-professional status by 2021.

20 teams entered and to be split into 2 groups, an increase of 6 teams compared to 14 teams in the previous edition. The top four teams of each group then played in the play-offs to determine which teams qualified for promotion to the Premier League in the 2023 season. The bottom three teams of each group were relegated to the M4 League.

On 20 July, the Malaysian Football League (MFL) had announced that the finalists of the M3 League would be playing against the bottom 2 non-feeder teams from the Premier League to determine the last 2 teams that qualified for the 2023 Malaysia Super League, a pool consisting of 18 teams. If M3 clubs won the playoffs, they must still fulfil MFL’s club licensing criteria before being allowed to compete in Malaysia Super League. However, on 27 September 2022, it was announced by Malaysia Football League that the 7 M3 teams that applied for licensing to play in Super League, including champions PIB FC, have failed in their application, and consequently are not involved in the promotion to Super League.

== Season changes ==
The following teams have changed division since the 2020 season.

=== To Malaysia M3 League ===
Relegated from Premier League

- None

New Team

- BRM
- Bukit Tambun
- Langkawi
- Kinabalu Jaguar
- Kijang Rangers
- Malaysia University
- Real Chukai
- Respect
- Tok Janggut Warriors
- Tun Razak City

=== From Malaysia M3 League ===
Teams withdrawn (From 2021 Season)

- Cyberlynx
- MNY
- Kuala Kangsar
- Protap

(From 2020 Season)

- IKRAM Muda
- Klasiko
- Kuala Terengganu Rovers
- Melaka City
- Melawati
- Northern Lions-Mahsa
- Sarawak
- Semarak
- Thai Selangor

== Clubs locations ==
Locations of teams in the 2022 Malaysia M3 League

=== Venues ===
Team	Location	Stadium	Capacity
Armed Forces	Kuala Lumpur	Mindef Stadium, Kuala Lumpur	1,000
(Perak) BRM	Kuala Kangsar	Manjung Stadium, Manjung, Perak	15,000
(Penang) Bukit Tambun	Bukit Tambun	Penang State Stadium, Batu Kawan, Penang	40,000
(Kedah) Langkawi	Langkawi	Langkawi Stadium, Langkawi, Kedah	10,000
(Selangor) Harini	Kuala Selangor	UPM Stadium, Serdang, Selangor	3,000
(Putrajaya) Immigration	Putrajaya	USIM Stadium, Nilai, Negeri Sembilan	1,000
(Kelantan) Kijang Rangers	Pasir Mas	Pasir Mas Mini Stadium, Pasir Mas, Kelantan	100
(Sabah) Kinabalu Jaguar	Kota Kinabalu	Penampang Stadium, Kota Kinabalu, Sabah	1,000
Kuala Lumpur Rovers	Kuala Lumpur	Kuala Lumpur Stadium, Kuala Lumpur	18,000
(Kedah) Langkawi City	Langkawi	Langkawi Stadium, Langkawi, Kedah	10,000
Malaysia University	Kuala Lumpur	UKM Bangi Stadium, Bangi, Selangor	500
(Perak) Manjung City	Seri Manjung	Manjung Stadium, Manjung, Perak	15,000
Perlis United	Kangar	Tuanku Syed Putra Stadium, Kangar, Perlis	20,000
(Selangor) PIB	Shah Alam	USIM Stadium, Nilai, Negeri Sembilan	1,000
(Terengganu) Real Chukai	Chukai	Mak Chili Stadium, Terengganu	500
(Perak) Respect	Ipoh	Perak Football Complex, Chemor, Perak	-
(Negeri Sembilan) Sains	Seremban	Tuanku Abdul Rahman Stadium, Paroi, Negeri Sembilan	45,000
(Kelantan) Tok Janggut Warriors	Pasir Puteh	Sultan Muhammad IV Stadium, Kota Bharu, Kelantan	22,000
(Kuala Lumpur) Tun Razak City	Bandar Tun Razak	UM Arena Stadium, Kuala Lumpur	1,000
(Selangor) Ultimate	Kajang	MMU Stadium, Cyberjaya, Selangor	1,000

== Personnel and sponsoring ==
Team	Head coach	Captain	Kit manufacturer	Sponsor
Armed Forces	(Malaysia) Boon Aik Hau	(Malaysia) Venice Elphi	Ego Sport	
BRM	(Malaysia) Ahmad Fairuz Yunus	(Malaysia) Azmeer Yusof	Stallion Apparel	Legasi
Bukit Tambun	(Malaysia) Izzat Nazari	(Malaysia) Muhd Zharif Md Desa	HakkaClo	Gimart
Langkawi	(Malaysia) Azhar Abdul Rahman	(Malaysia) Mohammad Norhamizikri	Sittra	
Harini	(Malaysia) G. Muthu	(Malaysia) Pravin	Zush Sports	Harini
Immigration	(Malaysia) Hamizar Hamzah	(Malaysia) Fauzi Majid	Zush Sports	redONE
Kijang Rangers	(Malaysia) Zahasmi Ismail	(Malaysia) Fairul Afikin	Gatti	Kijang Gold, Bina Thari
Kinabalu Jaguar	(Malaysia) Aiyyman Shah Johny	(Malaysia) Jenius Karib	Carino	VBB
Kuala Lumpur Rovers	(Malaysia) Zamri Hassan	(Malaysia) Muhammad Firdaus	Puma	
Langkawi City	(Malaysia) Abdul Ghani Long	(Malaysia) Hasif Khalid	Fitech	LGKSPORTS
Malaysian University	(Malaysia) Ridzuan Abu Shah	(Malaysia) Ahmad Hijazi	Lotto	
Manjung City	(Malaysia) Rafae Isa	(Malaysia) Muhammad Faizzzwan	HakkaClo	Lagenda Properties
Perlis United	(Malaysia) Azizul Abidin	(Malaysia) Azmizi Azmi	Lotto	Marina Island
PIB	(Malaysia) K. Ramachandran	(Malaysia) Ali Imran Alimi	Kelme	
Real Chukai	(Malaysia) Mohd Nik	(Malaysia) Zahieruddin Zakaria	Voltra	UC Tati
Respect	(Malaysia) S. Sathia Kumaran	(Malaysia) R. Surendran	Torpedo Sports	mycell technology, Swiss PharmaCan
SAINS	(Malaysia) Leong Hong Seng	(Malaysia) Yosry Derma Raju	Azman Adnan Apparel	MBI, Sains
Tok Janggut Warriors	(Malaysia) Hashim Mustapha	(Malaysia) Khairul Izuan Rosli	Axe Sportwear	Ayam Putih Sdn. Bhd
Tun Razak City	(Malaysia) Mat Zan Mat Aris	(Malaysia) Azidan Sarudin	X-Sports	SIMPLYK, MEGATRAVEL
Ultimate	(Malaysia) Azman Adnan	(Malaysia) Hariz Fazrin	Forfit	Forfit

== League table ==
=== Group A ===
Pos	Team	Pld	W	D	L	GF	GA	GD	Pts	Promotion or qualification
1	Kinabalu Jaguar	18	14	3	1	42	8	+34	45	Advance to knock-out stage & dissolved end of season.
2	Manjung City	18	11	3	4	33	10	+23	36	Advance to knock-out stage
3	Armed Forces	18	11	2	5	56	19	+37	35	Advance to knock-out stage
4	Immigration	18	10	4	4	52	23	+29	34	Advance to knock-out stage
5	SAINS	18	8	3	7	32	31	+1	27	
6	Malaysian University	18	5	8	5	18	11	+7	23	
7	Ultimate	18	6	4	8	22	41	−19	22	
8	Langkawi City	18	5	3	10	20	45	−25	18	Relegation to Malaysia M4 League and dissolved.
9	Tun Razak City	18	1	3	14	14	60	−46	6	Relegation to Malaysia M4 League and dissolved.
10	FC Langkawi	18	0	5	13	13	54	−41	5	Relegation to Malaysia M4 League and dissolved.

Source: FAM
Rules for classification: 1) Points; 2) Goal difference; 3) Number of goals scored.

=== Group B ===
Pos	Team	Pld	W	D	L	GF	GA	GD	Pts	Promotion or qualification
1	Harini	18	10	5	3	38	23	+15	35	Advance to knock-out stage
2	BRM	18	9	7	2	29	14	+15	34	Advance to knock-out stage
3	PIB	18	9	5	4	31	21	+10	32	Advance to knock-out stage
4	Kuala Lumpur Rovers	18	8	7	3	37	22	+15	31	Advance to knock-out stage
5	Perlis United	18	8	4	6	31	28	+3	28	
6	Bukit Tambun	18	6	5	7	21	21	0	23	
7	Respect	18	5	5	8	12	20	−8	20	Club resigned and dissolved.
8	Tok Janggut Warriors	18	5	2	11	15	29	−14	17	Relegation to Malaysia M4 League and dissolved.
9	Real Chukai	18	3	5	10	11	26	−15	14	Relegation to Malaysia M4 League
10	Kijang Rangers	18	2	5	11	18	39	−21	11	Relegation to Malaysia M4 League and dissolved.

Source: FAM
Rules for classification: 1) Points; 2) Goal difference; 3) Number of goals scored.

=== Result table ===
==== Group A ====
Home \ Away	AFC	FCL	IMI	KIJ	LCT	MAU	MCT	KSR	TRC	ULT
Armed Forces		8–0	1–3	0–2	0–2	0–0	2–1	3–0	2–1	4–1
Langkawi	0–2		0–1	2–2	0–3	0–0	0–4	1–3	1–1	2–3
Immigration	2–3	8–0		1–2	6–1	0–0	1–0	3–3	9–0	0–0
Kinabalu Jaguar F.C.	1–0	3–0	2–0		3–0	1–0	1–0	3–0	6–0	6–0
Langkawi City	0–15	1–1	1–2	1–3		1–1	0–3	3–2	0–3	0–2
Malaysian University	1–1	3–1	0–2	0–1	3–0		0–1	0–0	2–4	1–1
Manjung City	1–0	2–1	3–1	0–0	2–1	0–0		2–0	3–0	3–0
SAINS	3–5	7–2	1–2	1–1	0–2	1–0	2–1		2–1	1–0
Tun Razak City	3–2	1–1	2–7	2–5	10–3	1–3	1–1	2–0		1–0
Ultimate	0–6	2–1	4–4	1–0	0–0	0–3	0–6	2–3	3–1	

Source: FAM
Legend: Blue = home team win; Yellow = draw; Red = away team win.
For upcoming matches, an "a" indicates there is an article about the rivalry between the two participants.

==== Group B ====
Home \ Away	BRM	BUT	HAR	KIR	KLR	PLU	PIB	REC	RES	TOK
BRM		1–1	2–0	6–1	1–2	3–1	0–0	2–0	1–0	1–0
Bukit Tambun	0–1		1–1	3–1	1–1	3–1	1–3	0–0	1–1	1–0
Harini	1–1	1–0		5–2	2–4	1–1	2–1	3–0	3–1	2–0
Kijang Rangers	3–3	2–1	1–4		0–0	0–1	2–2	2–0	0–1	0–1
Kuala Lumpur Rovers	1–1	3–1	3–3	4–0		2–3	2–2	2–0	1–1	2–1
Perlis United	2–3	2–1	2–2	1–1	2–1		0–3	2–1	1–2	5–0
PIB	1–0	2–1	1–3	1–0	2–2	1–4		3–0	0–0	3–1
Real Chukai	1–1	0–2	3–2	2–1	0–1	0–0	1–2		0–0	1–1
Respect	0–2	0–1	0–1	0–0	0–5	3–1	2–1	1–0		0–1
Tok Janggut Warriors	0–0	1–2	0–2	4–2	2–1	1–2	0–3	1–2	1–0	

Source: FAM
Legend: Blue = home team win; Yellow = draw; Red = away team win.
For upcoming matches, an "a" indicates there is an article about the rivalry between the two participants.

== Knock-out stage ==
=== Bracket ===
Quarter-finals
Kinabalu Jaguar	2	1	3
Kuala Lumpur Rovers	2	2	4
BRM	2	1	3
Armed Forces	3	0	3
Manjung City	0	0	0
PIB	0	1	1
Harini	2	0	2
Immigration	1	2	3

Semi-finals
Kuala Lumpur Rovers	0	2	2
BRM	0	2	2
PIB	2	1	3
Immigration	1	0	1

Final
Kuala Lumpur Rovers	1 (3)
PIB	1 (5)

=== Quarter-finals ===
==== First leg ====
20 August 2022
20:45 UTC+8

Kinabalu Jaguar	2–2	Kuala Lumpur Rovers
Fattah 3'; Alphonso 44'	Report	Hafiq Omar 82'; Amirul Nizam 87'

Likas Stadium, Kota Kinabalu
Attendance: 400
Referee: Hasman Hisam Asngari

20 August 2022
20:45 UTC+8

Manjung City	0–0	PIB
	Report

Manjung Stadium, Seri Manjung
Attendance: 300
Referee: Shahrul Naim Shamsul Hisham

20 August 2022
16:45 UTC+8

Armed Forces	3–2	BRM
Shopri 18', 66'; Faiz Ibrahim 42'	Report	Abdul Hadi 54'; Maniom 88'

Mindef Stadium, Kuala Lumpur
Attendance: 200
Referee: Razlan Joffri Ali

20 August 2022
20:45 UTC+8

Immigration	1–2	Harini
Firdaus Azizul 89'	Report	K. Reuben 57'; Praviin 61'

UiTM Stadium, Shah Alam
Attendance: 532
Referee: Muhammad Khairulsyahmi Ahmad Khalidi

==== Second leg ====
27 August 2022
20:45 UTC+8

Kuala Lumpur Rovers	2–1	Kinabalu Jaguar
Nur Iqmal 3' (pen.); Faizal Hafiq 49'	Report	Ranilson Batuil 64'

UiTM Stadium, Shah Alam
Attendance: 230
Referee: Mohd Syukri Azeman

Kuala Lumpur Rovers won 4-3 on aggregate.

27 August 2022
16:15 UTC+8

PIB	1–0	Manjung City
Muhammad Hadi 68'	Report

USIM Stadium, Nilai
Attendance: 400
Referee: Muhammad Nasruddin Muhammad Tamrin

PIB FC won 1-0 on aggregate.

27 August 2022
20:45 UTC+8

BRM	1–0	Armed Forces
Nuriqmal 13'	Report

Perak Stadium, Ipoh
Attendance: 410
Referee: Muhamad Shamil Mohd Jaafar

BRM FC won on away goal regulation, aggregate 3-3.

27 August 2022
20:45 UTC+8

Harini	0–2	Immigration
	Report	Hazim 25'; Firdaus Azizul 37'

UPM Stadium, Serdang
Attendance: 300
Referee: S. Logeswaran

Immigration FC won 3-2 on aggregate.

=== Semi-finals ===
==== First leg ====
4 September 2022
20:45 UTC+8

Kuala Lumpur Rovers	0–0	BRM
	Report

Kuala Lumpur Stadium, Cheras
Attendance: 320
Referee: Mohd Syukri b. Azeman

4 September 2022
20:45 UTC+8

PIB	2–1	Immigration
Huzaini 43'; Azizul 89'	Report	Muhd Arif 84' (pen.)

UiTM Stadium, Shah Alam
Attendance: 657
Referee: Ahmad Zuhaidi Dzulkifli

==== Second leg ====
11 September 2022
20:45 UTC+8

BRM	2–2	Kuala Lumpur Rovers
Zhafir 57'; Nuriqmal 80'	Report	Shafiq 15'; Faizal Hafiq 66'

Perak Stadium, Ipoh
Attendance: 250
Referee: Sayed Ahmad Al-Quraisy

Kuala Lumpur Rovers FC won on away goal regulation, aggregate 2-2.

11 September 2022
20:45 UTC+8

Immigration	0–1	PIB
	Report	Muhammad Hadi 31'

Hang Jebat Stadium, Melaka
Attendance: 325
Referee: Mohammad Zamzaidi bin Katimin

PIB FC won 3-1 on aggregate.

=== Finals ===
24 September 2022
20:45 UTC+8

Kuala Lumpur Rovers	1 – 1	PIB
Muhammad Hadi Mizei@Termizi 50'	Report	Muhammad Khairu Anwar Khazali 82'
Penalties
Iqmal (penalty scored); Nazrul (penalty missed); Hafiz (penalty scored); Ubaidullah (penalty scored)	3 – 5	(penalty scored) Syukri; (penalty scored) Faizzudin; (penalty scored) Adam Shafiq; (penalty scored) Aniq; (penalty scored) Fa'es Hafize

Kuala Lumpur Stadium, Cheras
Attendance: 2117
Referee: Mohammad Zamzaidi Katimin
- PIB FC won 5–3 on penalties

== Season statistics ==
=== Top scorers ===
As of matches played on 11 Sep 2022.

Rank	Player	Club	Goals
1	Firdaus Azizul	Immigration FC	22
2	Faiz Ibrahim	Armed Forces FC	18
3	Shafiq Shaharudin	Kuala Lumpur Rovers	12
4	Ikmal Ibrahim	Perlis United	9
5	Rahmanshah Marajeh	Harini FT	8
5	Rizzham Norman	Tun Razak City	8

=== Hat-tricks ===
Player	For	Against	Result	Date
Rahmanshah Marajeh	Harini	Kijang Rangers	5 - 2 (H)	26 February 2022

Notes

^{4} Player scored 4 goals
^{5} Player scored 5 goals
(H) – Home team
(A) – Away team

== See also ==
- 2022 Malaysia Super League
- 2022 Malaysia Premier League
- 2022 Malaysia M5 League
- 2022 Malaysia FA Cup
- 2022 Malaysia Cup
- 2022 Malaysia Challenge Cup
- 2020 Piala Presiden
- 2022 Piala Belia
- List of Malaysian football transfers 2022
