= 2022 Malaysia FA Cup =

Tournament details
- Country: Malaysia
- Teams: 34

Final positions
- Champions: Johor Darul Ta'zim (2nd title)
- Runners-up: Terengganu

Tournament statistics
- Matches played: 33
- Goals scored: 124 (3.76 per match)
- Top goal scorer(s): Fernando Forestieri (6 goals)

The 2022 Malaysia FA Cup was the 32nd edition of the Malaysia FA Cup, a knockout competition for Malaysian association football clubs. The winners, if eligible, would be assured a place in the 2023–24 AFC Cup group stage. 34 teams entered the competition.

Kedah Darul Aman were the defending champions after winning the 2019 Malaysia FA Cup. The 2020 edition was abandoned midway during the tournament, and the 2021 edition was not played, both due to the COVID-19 pandemic in Malaysia.

== Qualified teams ==
The following teams played in the competition. Reserve teams were excluded.

Malaysia Super League the 12 teams of the 2022 season	Malaysia Premier League the 7 non-reserve teams of the 2022 season	Liga M3 the 15 teams of the 2022 season
Johor Darul Ta'zim; Kedah Darul Aman; Kuala Lumpur City; Melaka United; Negeri Sembilan; Penang; Petaling Jaya City; Sabah; Sarawak United; Selangor; Sri Pahang; Terengganu	FAM-MSN; Kelantan; Kelantan United; Kuching City; PDRM; Perak; UiTM	BRM FC; Bukit Tambun; Kinabalu Jaguar; Harini; Immigration; Kijang Rangers; PIB; Langkawi City; Manjung City; Perlis United; Respect; SAINS; Tok Janggut Warriors; Tun Razak City; Ultimate

== Round and draw dates ==
Round	Draw date	Match dates
Preliminary	23 February 2022	6 March
First round	23 February 2022	11 March–29 April
Second round	20 April 2022	13 May–8 July
Quarter-finals	4 July 2022	23 July
Semi-finals	4 July 2022	5–7 August
Final	4 July 2022	28 August

== Preliminary ==
Key: (1) = Super League; (2) = Premier League; (3) = Liga M3

The draw for the preliminary round was held on 23 February 2022. The matches were held on 6 March.

6 March 2022	Bukit Tambun (3)	2–1 (a.e.t.)	Immigration (3)	Batu Kawan, Penang
16:15 UTC+8	Danial Arifin 7'; Saiful Basir 118'	Report	Fauzi Abdul Latif 10'	Stadium: Penang State Stadium; Attendance: 150; Referee: Mohd Hasrul bin A. Rahman; Man of the Match: Mohd Hafidz Romly (Bukit Tambun)

6 March 2022	BRM FC (3)	2–1	Tun Razak City (3)	Seri Manjung, Perak
21:00 UTC+8	Khairul Asyraf 31', 84'	Report	Shafiq Shahrudin 5'	Stadium: Manjung Municipal Council Stadium; Attendance: 120; Referee: Mohamad Izzat Izaini Ali; Man of the Match: Khairul Asyraf (BRM)

== First round ==
Key: (1) = Super League; (2) = Premier League; (3) = Liga M3

The draw for the first round was held on 23 February 2022. The matches were held between 11 March and 29 April.

11 March 2022	Kelantan United (2)	4–0	Kinabalu Jaguar (3)	Kuala Terengganu
20:15 UTC+8	Haziq Subri 35'; Asraff Aliffuddin Yasin 43'; Amidu Salifu 52'; Jacob Njoku 58'	Report		Stadium: Sultan Ismail Nasiruddin Shah Stadium; Attendance: 135; Referee: Mohamad Faizudin bin Ismail; Man of the Match: Jacob Njoku (Kelantan United)

11 March 2022	Selangor (1)	6–0	Harini (3)	Petaling Jaya
21:00 UTC+8	Caion 17', 63', 67'; Hyuri 29'; Safuwan Baharudin 42'; Syahir Bashah 47'	Report		Stadium: Petaling Jaya Stadium; Attendance: 702; Referee: Ahmad Zuhaidi Dzulkifli; Man of the Match: Caion (Selangor)

11 March 2022	Penang (1)	4–0	Bukit Tambun (3)	George Town, Penang
21:00 UTC+8	Rafael Vitor 17' (pen.); Alif Romli 21'; Rafiuddin Roddin 64'; Danial Ashraf Abdullah 90'	Report		Stadium: City Stadium, Penang; Attendance: 358; Referee: Muhammad Munir Mohd Izam; Man of the Match: Mohd Hafidz Romly (Bukit Tambun)

12 March 2022	Sabah (1)	2–0	Respect (3)	Kota Kinabalu, Sabah
19:30 UTC+8	Ummareng Bacok 50'; Nazirul Naim Che Hashim 85'	Report		Stadium: Likas Stadium; Attendance: 1,096; Referee: Mohd Shahmi bin Ismail; Man of the Match: Ummareng Bacok (Sabah)

12 March 2022	Kedah Darul Aman (1)	4–0	SAINS (3)	Alor Setar. Kedah
21:00 UTC+8	Fayadh Zulkifli 18', 47'; Amer Azahar 50', 60'	Report		Stadium: Darul Aman Stadium; Attendance: 1,333; Referee: Mohd Fusser bin Mad Sallih; Man of the Match: Fayadh Zulkifli (Kedah)

13 March 2022	Johor Darul Ta'zim (1)	10–0	BRM FC (3)	Iskandar Puteri, Johor
20:15 UTC+8	Fernando Forestieri 2', 24', 42' (pen.); Safiq Rahim 7'; Safawi Rasid 19'; Maurício 56'; Moussa Sidibé 70' (pen.); Daryl Sham 82'; Mohamadou Sumareh 89'; Danial Amier 90+3'	Report		Stadium: Sultan Ibrahim Stadium; Attendance: 5,505; Referee: Khirulazuan Kidam; Man of the Match: Fernando Forestieri (Johor Darul Ta'zim)

13 March 2022	Sarawak United (1)	7–0	Ultimate (3)	Kuching
20:15 UTC+8	Boris Kok 9'; Uche Agba 51', 72'; Shamie Iszuan 58'; Khairil Anuar 73'; Zharmien Ashraf 81'; Francis Koné 86'	Report		Stadium: Sarawak State Stadium; Attendance: 522; Referee: Firdaus Dahlan; Man of the Match: Uche Agba (Sarawak United)

13 March 2022	Petaling Jaya City (1)	2–1	Kelantan (2)	Petaling Jaya
21:00 UTC+8	Darren Lok 24'; Rajes Perumal 79'	Report	Fadel Antar 18'	Stadium: Petaling Jaya Stadium; Attendance: 912; Referee: Mohamad Kamil Zakaria bin Ismail; Man of the Match: Darren Lok (Petaling Jaya City)

13 March 2022	Kuala Lumpur City (1)	8–0	Langkawi City (3)	Cheras, Kuala Lumpur
21:00 UTC+8	Fakrul Aiman 13', 29'; Partiban Janasekaran 15'; Zhafri Yahya 45'; Giancarlo Gallifuoco 73'; Hadin Azman 76'; Paulo Josué 86'; Kevin Koubemba 89'	Report		Stadium: Kuala Lumpur Stadium; Attendance: 329; Referee: S. Logeswaran; Man of the Match: Zhafri Yahya (Kuala Lumpur City)

15 March 2022	FAM-MSN (2)	5–1	Tok Janggut Warriors (3)	Cheras, Kuala Lumpur
20:15 UTC+8	Haikal Sahar 32', 51', 62'; Wan Syamil 67'; Ubaidullah Shamsul 90+1'	Report	Khairul Izuan 18'	Stadium: Kuala Lumpur Stadium; Attendance: 210; Referee: Mohamad Amir Fakhri bin Ismail; Man of the Match: Haikal Sahar (FAM-MSN)

23 March 2022	PDRM (2)	0–2	Perlis United (3)	Cheras
21:00 UTC+8		Report	Azrizan Ahmad 26'; Faizal Kadir 90+6'	Stadium: Kuala Lumpur Stadium; Attendance: 150; Referee: Razlan bin Joffri Ali; Man of the Match: Hairol Fazreen Abu Hassan (Perlis United)

23 March 2022	Sri Pahang (1)	0–0 (a.e.t.) (5–4 p)	Manjung City (3)	Kuantan, Pahang
20:15 UTC+8		Report		Stadium: Darul Makmur Stadium; Attendance: 358; Referee: Muhammad Nasruddin b Muhammad Tamrin; Man of the Match: Mamadou Samassa (Sri Pahang)

31 March 2022	Melaka United (1)	4–0	PIB (3)	Melaka
20:15 UTC+8	Emmanuel Oti 12'; Adriano 46' (pen.); Norshahrul Idlan 60', 76'	Report		Stadium: Hang Jebat Stadium; Attendance: 437; Referee: Helmi Ali; Man of the Match: Norshahrul Idlan (Melaka)

31 March 2022	Kuching City (2)	2–0	UiTM (2)	Kuching
20:15 UTC+8	Shafizi Iqmal 56'; Alif Hassan 62'	Report		Stadium: Sarawak State Stadium; Attendance: 309; Referee: Jubik bin Andangon; Man of the Match: Mazwandi Zekeria (Kuching City)

31 March 2022	Perak (2)	1–0 (a.e.t.)	Kijang Rangers (3)	Ipoh, Perak
21:00 UTC+8	Hakimi Mat Isa 101'	Report		Stadium: Perak Stadium; Attendance: 1,197; Referee: Muhammad Azwan bin Muhamad Marimuthu; Man of the Match: Aqil Hilman (Perak)

29 April 2022	Terengganu (1)	2–1	Negeri Sembilan (1)	Kuala Terengganu
20:15 UTC+8	Herold Goulon 28' (o.g.); Faizal Abdul Halim 38'	Report	Omid Nazari 35'	Stadium: Sultan Mizan Zainal Abidin Stadium; Attendance: 5,850; Referee: Suhaizi Shukri; Man of the Match: Kpah Sherman (Terengganu)

== Second round ==
Key: (1) = Super League; (2) = Premier League; (3) = Liga M3

The draw for the second round was held on 20 April 2022. The matches were held between 13 May and 8 July.

13 May 2022	Sabah (1)	2–1 (a.e.t.)	Kelantan United (2)	Kota Kinabalu, Sabah
19:30 UTC+8	Kagayama 41'; Saddil 111'	Report	Jacob Njoku 67'	Stadium: Likas Stadium; Attendance: 2,427; Referee: Mohammad Zamzaidi bin Katimin; Man of the Match: Taiki Kagayama (Sabah)

14 May 2022	Melaka United (1)	2–1	Petaling Jaya City (1)	Melaka
21:00 UTC+8	Sony Norde 11'; Adriano 55'	Report	Darren Lok 50'	Stadium: Hang Jebat Stadium; Attendance: 1,856; Referee: Mohd Amirul Izwan bin Yaacob; Man of the Match: Sony Norde (Melaka)

14 May 2022	Johor Darul Ta'zim (1)	3–0	Sarawak United (1)	Iskandar Puteri, Johor
20:15 UTC+8	Faiz 6'; Forestieri 15', 43'	Report		Stadium: Sultan Ibrahim Stadium; Attendance: 8,587; Referee: Khirulazuan Kidam; Man of the Match: Fernando Forestieri (Johor Darul Ta'zim)

14 May 2022	Perak (2)	1–4	Penang (1)	Ipoh
21:00 UTC+8	Aqil Hilman 69'	Report	El-Helwe 2' (pen.), 90'; Aiman Khairul Yusni 29' (o.g.); Adib Raop 90+2'	Stadium: Perak Stadium; Attendance: 3,476; Referee: Abdul Rahman bin Wahab; Man of the Match: El-Helwe (Penang)

14 May 2022	Sri Pahang (1)	3–0	FAM-MSN (2)	Kuantan
20:15 UTC+8	Mahmoud Za'tara 6', 28'; Sharul Nizam Nadzir 90'	Report		Stadium: Darul Makmur Stadium; Attendance: 628; Referee: Muhammad Khairulsyahmi bin Ahmad Khalidi; Man of the Match: N/A

17 May 2022	Perlis United (3)	0–3	Kuching City (2)	Kangar, Perlis
21:00 UTC+8		Report	Abu Kamara 18' (pen.); Amir Amri 33'; Alemão 57'	Stadium: Tuanku Syed Putra Stadium; Attendance: 1,343; Referee: Mohamad Faizudin Bin Ismail

6 July 2022	Terengganu (1)	1–0	Kedah Darul Aman (1)	Kuala Terengganu
21:00 UTC+8	Nasir 7'	Report		Stadium: Sultan Mizan Zainal Abidin Stadium; Attendance: 11,689; Referee: Mond Amirul Izwan bin Yaacob; Man of the Match: Faisal Halim (Terengganu)

8 July 2022	Selangor (1)	1–0	Kuala Lumpur City (1)	Petaling Jaya
21:00 UTC+8	Haiqal 61'	Report		Stadium: Petaling Jaya Stadium; Attendance: 2,354; Referee: Hamdan bin Awang; Man of the Match: Sharul Nazeem (Selangor)

== Knockout round ==
=== Bracket ===
Quarterfinals
Terengganu (1)	4
Kuching City (2)	1
Sabah (1)	0
Selangor (1)	2
Melaka United (1)	1
Johor Darul Ta'zim (1)	2
Sri Pahang (1)	2
Penang (1) (a.e.t.)	5

Semifinals
Terengganu (1) (p)	1 (4)
Selangor (1)	1 (2)
Johor Darul Ta'zim (1)	6
Penang (1)	1

Final
Terengganu (1)	1
Johor Darul Ta'zim (1)	3

=== Quarter-finals ===
23 July 2022
21:00 UTC+8
QF 1

Terengganu (1)	4–1	Kuching City (2)
Nasir 20'; Kipré 73', 79'; Halim 87'	Report	Salleh 42'

Sultan Mizan Zainal Abidin Stadium, Kuala Terengganu
Attendance: 20,500
Referee: Ahmad Zuhaidi Dzulkifli
23 July 2022
19:30 UTC+8
QF 2

Sabah (1)	0–2	Selangor (1)
	Report	Hyuri 1'; Caion 81'

Likas Stadium, Kota Kinabalu
Attendance: 19,410
Referee: Suhaizi Shukri
23 July 2022
21:00 UTC+8
QF 3

Melaka United (1)	1–2	Johor Darul Ta'zim (1)
Norde 84' (pen.)	Report	Bakri 4'; Bergson 90+3'

Hang Jebat Stadium, Paya Rumput
Attendance: 18,289
Referee: Khirulazuan Kidam
23 July 2022
20:15 UTC+8
QF 4

Sri Pahang (1)	2–5 (a.e.t.)	Penang (1)
Rodríguez 12'; Aripin 20'	Report	Saravanan 45+3'; El-Helwe 86', 99'; Silva 96'; Thivandaran 118'

Darul Makmur Stadium, Kuantan
Attendance: 2,199
Referee: S. Logeswaran

=== Semi-finals ===
6 August 2022
21:00 UTC+8
SF 1

Terengganu (1)	1–1 (a.e.t.)	Selangor (1)
Halim 49'	Report	Hassan 24'
Penalties
Haroon (penalty scored); Zuasyraf (penalty scored); Ott (penalty missed); Shakir (penalty scored); Nizam (penalty scored)	4–2	(penalty scored) Abdel-Rahman; (penalty missed) Haiqal; (penalty missed) Al-Alab; (penalty scored) Fikri

Sultan Mizan Zainal Abidin Stadium, Kuala Terengganu
Attendance: 33,332
Referee: Zulkarnain Bin Zakaria
5 August 2022
21:00 UTC+8
SF 2

Johor Darul Ta'zim (1)	6–1	Penang (1)
Bergson 19'; Forestieri 24'; Aiman 48', 51', 63'; Syahmi 90+2'	Report	Silva 54'

Sultan Ibrahim Stadium, Iskandar Puteri
Attendance: 34,213
Referee: Razlan Bin Joffri Ali

=== Final ===
10 September 2022
21:00 UTC+8
Final

Terengganu (1)	1–3	Johor Darul Ta'zim (1)
Kipré 76'	Report	Aiman 34'; Bergson 63', 78'

Bukit Jalil National Stadium, Kuala Lumpur
Attendance: 84,321
Referee: Muhammad Nazmi Nasaruddin

== Top goalscorers ==
As of 24 July 2022

Rank	Player	Club	Goals
1	(Italy) Fernando Forestieri	Johor Darul Ta'zim	5
2	(Brazil) Caion	Selangor	4
2	(Lebanon) Hilal El-Helwe	Penang FC	4
4	(Malaysia) Haikal Sahar	FAM-MSN	3
5	(Malaysia) Khairul Asyraf	BRM F.C.	2
5	(Malaysia) Fayadh Zulkifli	Kedah Darul Aman	2
5	(Malaysia) Amer Azahar	Kedah Darul Aman	2
5	(Nigeria) Uche Agba	Sarawak United FC	2
5	(Malaysia) Fakrul Aiman	Kuala Lumpur City	2
5	(Malaysia) Norshahrul Idlan	Melaka United	2
5	(Nigeria) Jacob Njoku	Kelantan United	2
5	(Brazil) Adriano Narcizo	Melaka United	2
5	(Malaysia) Darren Lok	Petaling Jaya City FC	2
5	(Jordan) Mahmoud Za'tara	Sri Pahang FC	2
15	56 players	21 clubs	1

== See also ==
- 2022 Malaysia Super League
- 2022 Malaysia Premier League
- 2022 Malaysia M3 League
