= 2019 in Malaysian football =

Football in Malaysia
- Season: 2019

Men's football
- Super League: Johor Darul Ta'zim
- Premier League: Sabah
- M3 League: Kelantan United
- FA Cup: Kedah
- Malaysia Cup: Johor Darul Ta'zim
- Challenge Cup: Johor Darul Ta'zim II
- Community Shield: Johor Darul Ta'zim

The 2019 season of competitive association football in Malaysia.

== Promotion and relegation ==
=== Pre-season ===
League	Promoted to league	Relegated from league
Liga Super	Felda United; PJ City	Negeri Sembilan; Kelantan
Liga Premier	Selangor United; Perlis	—

== New and withdrawn teams ==
=== New teams ===
- PJ City (Liga Super)

=== Withdrawn teams ===
- Felcra (Liga Super)

== National team ==
Win Draw Lose

=== Malaysia national football team ===
==== 2019 Airmarine Cup ====
20 March 2019 Semi-finals	Malaysia	0–1	Singapore	Kuala Lumpur, Malaysia
20:45 UTC+8		Report (WF); Report (FSA)	Faris 82'	Stadium: Bukit Jalil National Stadium; Referee: Yudi Nurcahya (Indonesia)

23 March 2019 Third place	Afghanistan	1–2	Malaysia	Kuala Lumpur, Malaysia
16:30 UTC+8	Shayesteh 32'	Report (WF); Report (FSA)	Faiz 44'; Alikhil 84' (o.g.)	Stadium: Bukit Jalil National Stadium; Referee: Chaireag Ngamsom (Thailand)

==== Friendly ====
2 June 2019	Malaysia	2–0	Nepal	Kuala Lumpur, Malaysia
22:00 UTC+8	Safawi 51' (pen.); Shahrul 82'	Report (WF)		Stadium: Bukit Jalil National Stadium; Attendance: 3,797; Referee: Nazmi Nasaruddin (Malaysia)

30 August 2019	Malaysia	0–1	Jordan	Kuala Lumpur, Malaysia
20:45 UTC+8		Report	Murjan 7'	Stadium: Bukit Jalil National Stadium; Referee: Nazmi Nasaruddin (Malaysia)

5 October 2019	Malaysia	6–0	Sri Lanka	Kuala Lumpur, Malaysia
20:45 UTC+8	Syafiq 9', 76', 89'; Shahrul 14'; Norshahrul 17'; Akhyar 51'	Report		Stadium: Bukit Jalil National Stadium; Referee: Razlan Joffri Ali (Malaysia)

9 November 2019	Malaysia	1–0	Tajikistan	Kuala Lumpur, Malaysia
20:45 UTC+8	Safawi 72'	Report		Stadium: Bukit Jalil National Stadium; Attendance: 14,200; Referee: Razlan Joffri Ali (Malaysia)

==== 2022 World Cup qualification ====
7 June 2019 (Note: The home match of Malaysia against Timor-Leste, originally to be played on 6 June 2019, was later postponed due to Eid al-Fitr celebrations following a request from the Football Association of Malaysia.) 2022 WC QL (R1)	Malaysia	7–1	Timor-Leste	Kuala Lumpur, Malaysia
20:45 UTC+8	Corbin-Ong 12'; Shahrel 23'; Norshahrul 43'; Safawi 45+1', 59'; Faiz 78'; Akhyar 89'	Report	João Pedro 52'	Stadium: Bukit Jalil National Stadium; Attendance: 4,244; Referee: Sherzod Kasimov (Uzbekistan)

11 June 2019 2022 WC QL (R1)	Timor-Leste	1–5	Malaysia	Kuala Lumpur, Malaysia
20:45 UTC+8	Rufino Gama 72'	Report	Shahrel 10', 17', 64'; Sumareh 37'; Akhyar 55'	Stadium: Bukit Jalil National Stadium (Note: Timor-Leste played their home match against Malaysia in the latter country due to a lack of a suitable venue in their country.); Referee: Yusuke Araki (Japan)

5 September 2019 2022 WCQ R2	Indonesia	2–3	Malaysia	Jakarta, Indonesia
19:30 UTC+7	Gonçalves 11', 38'	Report (FIFA); Report (AFC)	Sumareh 36', 90+6'; Syafiq 65'	Stadium: Gelora Bung Karno Stadium; Attendance: 54,659; Referee: Ko Hyung-jin (South Korea)

10 September 2019 2022 WCQ R2	Malaysia	1–2	United Arab Emirates	Kuala Lumpur, Malaysia
20:45 UTC+8	Syafiq 1'	Report (FIFA); Report (AFC)	Mabkhout 43', 75'	Stadium: Bukit Jalil National Stadium; Attendance: 43,200; Referee: Hiroyuki Kimura (Japan)

10 October 2019 2022 WCQ R2	Vietnam	1–0	Malaysia	Hanoi, Vietnam
18:00 UTC+7	Nguyễn Quang Hải 40'	Report (FIFA); Report (AFC)		Stadium: Mỹ Đình National Stadium; Attendance: 38,256; Referee: Mooud Bonyadifar (Iran)

14 November 2019 2022 WCQ R2	Malaysia	2–1	Thailand	Kuala Lumpur, Malaysia
20:45 UTC+8	Gan 26'; Sumareh 57'	Report (FIFA); Report (AFC)	Chanathip 7'	Stadium: Bukit Jalil National Stadium; Attendance: 39,363; Referee: Ali Sabah (Iraq)

19 November 2019 2022 WCQ R2	Malaysia	2–0	Indonesia	Kuala Lumpur, Malaysia
20:45 UTC+8	Safawi 30', 73'	Report (FIFA); Report (AFC)		Stadium: Bukit Jalil National Stadium; Attendance: 75,044; Referee: Alireza Faghani (Iran)

=== Malaysia national under-22 football team ===
==== 2020 AFC U-23 Championship qualification ====
Group J
Pos	Team	Pld	W	D	L	GF	GA	GD	Pts	Qualification
1	China	3	2	1	0	15	2	+13	7	Final tournament
2	Malaysia (H)	3	2	1	0	6	2	+4	7	
3	Laos	3	1	0	2	3	8	−5	3	
4	Philippines	3	0	0	3	2	14	−12	0	

Source: AFC
Rules for classification: Qualification tiebreakers
(H) Hosts

22 March 2019	Malaysia	3–0	Philippines	Shah Alam Stadium, Shah Alam
20:45	Akhyar 4', 31'; Faisal 83'	Report		Attendance: 7,606; Referee: Turki Al-Khudhayr (Saudi Arabia)

24 March 2019	Laos	0–1	Malaysia	Shah Alam Stadium, Shah Alam
20:45		Report	Safawi 81'	Attendance: 9,705; Referee: Masoud Tufayelieh (Syria)

26 March 2019	Malaysia	2–2	China	Shah Alam Stadium, Shah Alam
20:45	Zhu Chenjie 10' (o.g.); Danial 54'	Report	Zhang Yuning 16'; Jiang Shenglong 83'	Referee: Turki Al-Khudhayr (Saudi Arabia)

==== 2019 Southeast Asian Games ====
Group A
Pos	Team	Pld	W	D	L	GF	GA	GD	Pts	Qualification
1	Myanmar	4	3	1	0	8	4	+4	10	Semi-finals
2	Cambodia	4	2	1	1	10	4	+6	7	Semi-finals
3	Philippines (H)	4	2	1	1	9	4	+5	7	
4	Malaysia	4	1	1	2	6	5	+1	4	
5	Timor-Leste	4	0	0	4	2	18	−16	0	

Source: 2019 SEAG (archived)
Rules for classification: 1) Points; 2) Goal difference; 3) Goals scored
(H) Hosts

25 November 2019 2019 SEA Games GS	Malaysia	v	Myanmar	Manila, Philippines
16:00 UTC+8				Stadium: Rizal Memorial Stadium

29 November 2019 2019 SEA Games GS	Philippines	v	Malaysia	Manila, Philippines
20:00 UTC+8				Stadium: Rizal Memorial Stadium

2 December 2019 2019 SEA Games GS	Malaysia	v	Timor-Leste	Manila, Philippines
20:00 UTC+8				Stadium: Rizal Memorial Stadium

4 December 2019 2019 SEA Games GS	Cambodia	v	Malaysia	Manila, Philippines
16:00 UTC+8				Stadium: Rizal Memorial Stadium

==== 2019 AFF U-22 Youth Championship ====
Group B
Pos	Team	Pld	W	D	L	GF	GA	GD	Pts	Qualification
1	Cambodia (H)	3	2	0	1	3	2	+1	6	Knockout stage
2	Indonesia	3	1	2	0	5	3	+2	5	Knockout stage
3	Malaysia	3	1	1	1	3	3	0	4	
4	Myanmar	3	0	1	2	1	4	−3	1	

Source: AFF
(H) Hosts

18 February 2019 Group stage	Malaysia	0–1	Cambodia	Olympic Stadium, Phnom Penh
18:30		Report	Rosib 62'	Attendance: 3,875; Referee: Nguyễn Hiền Triết (Vietnam)

20 February 2019 Group stage	Indonesia	2–2	Malaysia	Olympic Stadium, Phnom Penh
15:30	Marinus 52'; Witan 77'	Report	Nik Akif 62'; Hadi 86'	Attendance: 600; Referee: Steve Supresencia (Philippines)

22 February 2019 Group stage	Malaysia	1–0	Myanmar	RSN Stadium, Phnom Penh
18:30	Hadi 44'			Attendance: 115; Referee: Sivakorn Pu-udom (Thailand)

=== Malaysia national under-19 football team ===
==== 2020 AFC U-19 Championship qualification ====
Pos	Team	Pld	W	D	L	GF	GA	GD	Pts	Qualification
1	Malaysia	4	4	0	0	27	4	+23	12	Final tournament
2	Cambodia (H)	4	3	0	1	18	6	+12	9	Final tournament
3	Thailand	4	2	0	2	31	3	+28	6	
4	Brunei	4	1	0	3	4	26	−22	3	
5	Northern Mariana Islands	4	0	0	4	3	44	−41	0	

Source: AFC
Rules for classification: Qualification tiebreakers
(H) Hosts

2 November 2019 2020 AFC U-19 qualification (group G)	Cambodia	4–5	Malaysia	Phnom Penh, Cambodia
18:30 UTC+7	Met 61'; Chea 65'; Ry Leap 77'; Soeuth 88'	Report	Shafi 30'; Fakrul 40'; Azrin 42'; Luqman 67'; Muslihuddin 73'	Stadium: National Olympic Stadium; Attendance: 4,685; Referee: Çarymyrat Kurbanow (Turkmenistan)

6 November 2019 2020 AFC U-19 qualification (group G)	Malaysia	11–0	Brunei	Phnom Penh, Cambodia
18:30 UTC+7	Azrin 17'; Luqman 21' (pen.), 22', 23', 41'; Azam 31', 60'; Aiman 39', 84', 90+2'; Harith 59' (pen.)	Report		Stadium: National Olympic Stadium; Attendance: 261; Referee: Choe Kwang-Hyon (North Korea)

8 November 2019 2020 AFC U-19 qualification (group G)	Malaysia	10–0	Northern Mariana Islands	Phnom Penh, Cambodia
15:30 UTC+7	Aiman Afif 7', 46', 74', 79'; Hazim Zaid 9'; Aidil Azuan 20'; Fahmi Daniel 45+1', 56'; Firdaus Ramli 64' (pen.); Azrul Haikal 66'	Report		Stadium: National Olympic Stadium; Attendance: 328; Referee: Baraa Aisha (Palestine)

10 November 2019 2020 AFC U-19 qualification (group G)	Thailand	0–1	Malaysia	Phnom Penh, Cambodia
15:30 UTC+7		Report	Umar Hakeem 84'	Stadium: National Olympic Stadium; Attendance: 1,324; Referee: Çarymyrat Kurbanow (Turkmenistan)

==== 2019 AFF U-19 Youth Championship ====
Group B
Pos	Team	Pld	W	D	L	GF	GA	GD	Pts	Qualification
1	Australia	5	4	0	1	17	6	+11	12	Knockout stage
2	Malaysia	5	3	0	2	9	3	+6	9	Knockout stage
3	Vietnam (H)	5	2	1	2	6	6	0	7	
4	Cambodia	5	2	0	3	7	13	−6	6	
5	Thailand	5	1	2	2	6	8	−2	5	
6	Singapore	5	1	1	3	3	12	−9	4	

Source: aseanfootball.org
(H) Hosts

7 August 2019 Group stage	Vietnam	1–0	Malaysia	Thống Nhất Stadium, Ho Chi Minh City
19:30	Võ Minh Trọng 89'	Report		Attendance: 5,279; Referee: Clifford Daypuyat (Philippines)

9 August 2019 Group stage	Malaysia	3–1	Singapore	Thống Nhất Stadium, Ho Chi Minh City
16:30	Firdaus K. 6', 51'; Luqman 88'	Report	Zamani 75'	Attendance: 355; Referee: Dwi Purba Wicaksana (Indonesia)

11 August 2019 Group stage	Malaysia	3–0	Cambodia	Thành Long Stadium, Ho Chi Minh City
15:30	Mukhairi 18'; Muslihuddin 38'; Firdaus R. 45+2'	Report		Attendance: 200; Referee: Thoriq Alkatiri (Indonesia)

13 August 2019 Group stage	Australia	0–3	Malaysia	Ho Chi Minh City, Vietnam
15:30 UTC+7		Report	Luqman 17', 39'; Azam 27'	Stadium: Thành Long Stadium; Attendance: 300; Referee: Souei Vongkham (Laos)

15 August 2019 Group stage	Malaysia	0–1	Thailand	Ho Chi Minh City, Vietnam
16:00 UTC+7		Report	Sitthinan 69'	Stadium: Thành Long Stadium; Attendance: 300; Referee: Clifford Daypuyat (Philippines)

17 August 2019 Semi-finals	Indonesia	3–4 (a.e.t.)	Malaysia	Thủ Dầu Một, Vietnam
16:30 UTC+7	Bagus 45'; Fajar 80'; Brylian 83'	Report	Aiman 19'; Luqman 54'; Harith 84' (pen.), 99'	Stadium: Gò Đậu Stadium; Attendance: 564; Referee: Mongkolchai Pechsri (Thailand)

19 August 2019 Final	Malaysia	0–1	Australia	Ho Chi Minh City, Vietnam
19:30 UTC+7		Report	Brook 79'	Stadium: Thống Nhất Stadium; Attendance: 859; Referee: Ngô Duy Lân (Vietnam)

=== Malaysia national under-16 football team ===
==== 2020 AFC U-16 Championship qualification ====
Group J
Pos	Team	Pld	W	D	L	GF	GA	GD	Pts	Qualification
1	Japan	3	2	1	0	14	2	+12	7	Final tournament
2	Laos (H)	3	2	0	1	2	4	−2	6	
3	Malaysia	3	1	1	1	9	3	+6	4	
4	Cambodia	3	0	0	3	0	16	−16	0	

Source: AFC
Rules for classification: Qualification tiebreakers
(H) Hosts

18 September 2019 2020 AFC U-16 qualification (group J)	Malaysia	7–0	Cambodia	Laos
--:-- UTC+7	Adam U. 7' (pen.); Adam F. 16'; Akid 22', 30'; Harry 52'; Nabil 65'; Khairil 90'	Report		Stadium: National Stadium, Vientiane; Attendance: 189; Referee: Tejas Nagvenkar (India)

20 September 2019 2020 AFC U-16 qualification (group J)	Laos	1–0	Malaysia	Laos
--:-- UTC+7	Somthongkham 4'	Report		Stadium: National Stadium, Vientiane; Attendance: 2,000; Referee: Shukri Al-Hunfush (Saudi Arabia)

22 September 2019 2020 AFC U-16 qualification (group J)	Japan	2–2	Malaysia	Laos
--:-- UTC+7	Osako 63' (pen.); Naito 90+4'	Report	Daniel 73' (pen.), 82'	Stadium: National Stadium, Vientiane; Attendance: 721; Referee: Shukri Al-Hunfush (Saudi Arabia)

==== 2019 AFF U-15 Youth Championship ====
Group B
Pos	Team	Pld	W	D	L	GF	GA	GD	Pts	Qualification
1	Malaysia	5	3	2	0	15	2	+13	11	Knockout stage
2	Thailand (H)	5	3	2	0	15	4	+11	11	Knockout stage
3	Australia	5	3	1	1	11	5	+6	10	
4	Laos	5	2	1	2	8	6	+2	7	
5	Cambodia	5	0	1	4	2	13	−11	1	
6	Brunei	5	0	1	4	2	23	−21	1	

Source: aseanfootball.org
Rules for classification: Tiebreakers
(H) Hosts

28 July 2019 2019 AFF U-15 Championship (group stage)	Malaysia	8–0	Brunei	Chonburi, Thailand
15:00 UTC+7	Harry 6', 13', 46'; Zubaidi 40+1', 40+3'; Hakim 40+4'; Nabil 57'; Aliff 72'	Report		Stadium: Chonburi Campus Stadium 1 Attendance: 50; Referee: Trường Hồng Vũ (Vietnam)

30 July 2019 2019 AFF U-15 Championship (group stage)	Malaysia	2–0	Cambodia	Chonburi, Thailand
15:30 UTC+7	Izrin 63'; Aliff 66'	Report		Stadium: Chonburi Campus Stadium 2 Attendance: 7 Referee: Linjun Talaver (Philippines)

1 August 2019 2019 AFF U-15 Championship (group stage)	Australia	0–3	Malaysia	Chonburi, Thailand
15:00 UTC+7		Report	Daniel 4' (pen.); Nabil 28'; Izrin 70'	Stadium: Chonburi Campus Stadium 1 Attendance: 80; Referee: Steve Supresencia (Philippines)

3 August 2019 2019 AFF U-15 Championship (group stage)	Malaysia	1–1	Laos	Chonburi, Thailand
15:30 UTC+7	Vongsakda 80' (o.g.)	Report	Thipphachan 33'	Stadium: Chonburi Campus Stadium 2 Attendance: 64; Referee: Linjun Talaver (Philippines)

5 August 2019 2019 AFF U-15 Championship (group stage)	Thailand	1–1	Malaysia	Chonburi, Thailand
18:00 UTC+7	Pornsawan 18'	Report	Sittha 80+3' (o.g.)	Stadium: Chonburi Campus Stadium 1 Attendance: 320; Referee: Steve Supresencia (Philippines)

7 August 2019 2019 AFF U-15 Championship (semi-finals)	Malaysia	3–1	Vietnam	Chonburi, Thailand
15:00 UTC+7	Nabil 14', 49'; Aliff 77'	Report	Phạm Văn Phong 9'	Stadium: Chonburi Campus Stadium 1 Attendance: 105; Referee: Abdul Hakim Mohd Haidi (Brunei)

9 August 2019 2019 AFF U-15 Championship (finals)	Thailand	1–2	Malaysia	Chonburi, Thailand
18:00 UTC+7	Theekawin 16'; Phakphum (yellow card) 55' (yellow-red card) 79'; Kongpop (red card) 80+4'	Report	Izrin 68'; Nabil 80'; Khairil (red card) 80+4'	Stadium: Chonburi Campus Stadium 1 Attendance: 2,500; Referee: Steve Supresencia (Philippines)

== League season ==
=== Liga Super ===
Pos	Team	Pld	W	D	L	GF	GA	GD	Pts	Qualification or relegation
1	Johor Darul Ta'zim (C)	22	16	5	1	49	19	+30	53	Qualification for AFC Champions League group stage
2	Pahang	22	12	7	3	37	21	+16	43	
3	Selangor	22	10	7	5	41	35	+6	37	
4	Kedah (Note: Kedah FA qualified for the AFC Champions League preliminary round 2 as Malaysia FA Cup winners.)	22	9	7	6	37	29	+8	34	Qualification for AFC Champions League preliminary round 2
5	Perak	22	8	9	5	36	31	+5	33	
6	Melaka United	22	9	6	7	34	30	+4	33	
7	Terengganu	22	7	9	6	35	37	−2	30	
8	Petaling Jaya City	22	8	2	12	22	29	−7	26	
9	PKNS (Note: PKNS F.C. relegated after withdrawing license to complete for the 2020 Malaysia Premier League season as they become feeder club to Selangor FA.) (R)	22	5	6	11	37	38	−1	21	Relegation to Malaysia Premier League
10	Felda United	22	4	7	11	27	43	−16	19	
11	PKNP (R)	22	3	7	12	22	40	−18	16	Relegation to Malaysia Premier League
12	Kuala Lumpur (R)	22	4	2	16	24	49	−25	14	Relegation to Malaysia Premier League

Source: MFL
Rules for classification: 1) Points; 2) Goal difference; 3) Number of goals scored.
(C) Champions; (R) Relegated

=== Liga Premier ===
Pos	Team	Pld	W	D	L	GF	GA	GD	Pts	Qualification or relegation
1	Sabah (C, P)	20	13	4	3	33	17	+16	43	Promotion to Super League and Qualification for the Malaysia Cup group stage
2	Johor Darul Ta'zim II (Note: Johor Darul Ta'zim II and Terengganu II cannot be promoted from Premier League and play for Malaysia Cup as Johor Darul Ta'zim F.C. and Terengganu F.C. (their parent clubs) remain in Super League and play for Malaysia Cup. Should Johor Darul Ta'zim and Terengganu be relegated to Premier League or will not play for Malaysia Cup, Johor Darul Ta'zim II and Terengganu II will have to drop to M3 League or will play for Malaysia Cup.)	20	9	6	5	31	19	+12	33	
3	PDRM (P)	20	9	3	8	30	27	+3	30	Promotion to Super League and Qualification for the Malaysia Cup group stage
4	Terengganu II	20	8	6	6	21	24	−3	30	
5	UiTM (Note: UiTM F.C. is promoted to replaced PKNS F.C. relegated after withdrawing license to complete for the 2020 Malaysia Premier League season as they become feeder club to Selangor FA.) (P)	20	8	5	7	33	25	+8	29	Promotion to Super League and Qualification for the Malaysia Cup group stage
6	Negeri Sembilan	20	8	5	7	29	25	+4	29	Qualification for the Malaysia Cup group stage
7	Penang	20	8	6	6	32	27	+5	24 (Note: Penang have been docked six points following the club’s failure to comply with FIFA’s decision over claims made by former Brazilian import defender, Reinaldo Lobo.)	Qualification for the Malaysia Cup group stage
8	UKM	20	6	4	10	28	32	−4	22	
9	Selangor United	20	6	3	11	24	37	−13	21	
10	Kelantan	20	4	8	8	23	32	−9	17 (Note: Kelantan have been docked three points following the club’s failure to comply with FIFA’s decision over claims made by former technical director Alfredo Carlos Gonzalez.)	
11	Sarawak (R)	20	4	4	12	25	44	−19	16	Qualification to relegation play-off
12	Perlis (Note: Perlis were disqualified on 20 February 2019.)	0	0	0	0	0	0	0	0	Disqualified

Source: MFL
Rules for classification: 1) Points; 2) Goal difference; 3) Number of goals scored.
(C) Champions; (P) Promoted; (R) Relegated

=== Liga M4 ===
1. Liga Melaka Division 1
2. KLFA Super League
3. Liga THB-KFA
4. Subang Football League
5. Terengganu Amateur League
6. MAHSA M4 League
7. Alumni M4 League
8. Puchong Community League
9. Shah Amateur League
10. Selangor Social Premier League
11. Sultan Johor Cup
12. Perlis Amateur League
13. PBNS Cup
14. Klang Valley M4 League
15. Play-off round

== Domestic Cups ==
=== Charity Shield ===
2 February 2019
21:00 UTC+8

Johor Darul Ta'zim	1–0	Perak
Cabrera 40'

Larkin Stadium, Johor Bahru, Johor
Referee: Zulkarnain Zakaria

=== FA Cup ===
27 July 2019
21:00 UTC+8

Perak	0–1 (a.e.t.)	Kedah
		Fadzrul Danel 105+1'

Bukit Jalil National Stadium, Bukit Jalil, Kuala Lumpur
Attendance: 83,520
Referee: Takuto Okabe (Japan)

=== Malaysia Cup ===
2 November 2019
21:00 UTC+8

Kedah	0–3	Johor Darul Ta'zim
Adha (yellow card) 9'; Bauman (yellow card) 14'; Shakir (yellow card) 21'	Report	Leandro 27'; Maurício (yellow card) 31'; Safawi 35'; Aidil (yellow card) 45+2'; Syafiq 58'

Bukit Jalil National Stadium, Bukit Jalil
Attendance: 85,420
Referee: Muhammad Nazmi Nasaruddin

=== Malaysia Challenge Cup ===
4 October 2019
21:00 UTC+8

Johor Darul Ta'zim II	1−0	UKM
Amirul 64'

Pasir Gudang Corporation Stadium
12 October 2019
21:00 UTC+8

UKM	1−0	Johor Darul Ta'zim II
Mateo Roskam 82'

KLFA Stadium

1−1 on aggregate. Johor Darul Ta'zim II won 6−5 on penalty after extra time.

== Malaysian clubs in Asia ==
=== Johor Darul Ta'zim ===
==== AFC Champions League ====
===== Group stage =====
Pos	Team	Pld	W	D	L	GF	GA	GD	Pts	Qualification	SDL	KAS	GYE	JDT
1	(China) Shandong Luneng	6	3	2	1	10	8	+2	11	Advance to knockout stage	—	2–2	2–1	2–1
2	(Japan) Kashima Antlers	6	3	1	2	9	8	+1	10	Advance to knockout stage	2–1	—	0–1	2–1
3	(South Korea) Gyeongnam FC	6	2	2	2	9	8	+1	8		2–2	2–3	—	2–0
4	(Malaysia) Johor Darul Ta'zim	6	1	1	4	4	8	−4	4		0–1	1–0	1–1	—

Source: AFC
Rules for classification: Group stage tiebreakers

5 March 2019	Kashima Antlers (Japan)	2–1	(Malaysia) Johor Darul Ta'zim	Kashima Soccer Stadium, Kashima
--:-- UTC+9	Hirato 43'; Serginho 56'	Live Report; Stats Report	Diogo 80'	Attendance: 6,425; Referee: Turki Al-Khudhayr (Saudi Arabia)

12 March 2019	Johor Darul Ta'zim (Malaysia)	1–1	(South Korea) Gyeongnam FC	Larkin Stadium, Johor Bahru
20:45 UTC+8	Diogo 68' (pen.)	Live Report; Stats Report	Kwak Tae-hwi 52'	Attendance: 16,130; Referee: Mohanad Qassim (Iraq)

9 April 2019	Shandong Luneng (China)	2–1	(Malaysia) Johor Darul Ta'zim	Jinan Olympic Sports Center Stadium, Jinan
19:30 UTC+8	Fellaini 30'; Pellè 39' (pen.)	Live Report; Stats Report	Safawi 59'	Attendance: 11,602; Referee: Adham Makhadmeh (Jordan)

24 April 2019	Johor Darul Ta'zim (Malaysia)	0–1	(China) Shandong Luneng	Larkin Stadium, Johor Bahru
20:45 UTC+8		Live Report; Stats Report	Pellè 22'	Attendance: 13,960; Referee: Khamis Al-Marri (Qatar)

8 May 2019	Johor Darul Ta'zim (Malaysia)	1–0	(Japan) Kashima Antlers	Larkin Stadium, Johor Bahru
20:45 UTC+8	Syafiq 69'	Live Report; Stats Report		Attendance: 4,860; Referee: Mohanad Qassim (Iraq)

22 May 2019	Gyeongnam FC (South Korea)	2–0	(Malaysia) Johor Darul Ta'zim	Changwon Football Center, Changwon
--:-- UTC+9		Live Report; Stats Report

=== Perak ===
==== AFC Champions League ====
===== Qualifying play-offs =====
12 February 2019 Preliminary round 2	Perak (Malaysia)	1–1 (a.e.t.) (6–5 p)	(Hong Kong) Kitchee	Perak Stadium, Ipoh
21:00 UTC+8	Wander 14'	Live Report; Stats Report	Li Ngai Hoi 88'	Attendance: 8,605; Referee: Hanna Hattab (Syria)
	Penalties
	Wander (penalty scored); Amirul (penalty scored); Parthiban (penalty scored); Leandro (penalty missed); Gilmar (penalty scored); Shahrul (penalty scored); Kenny (penalty scored)		(penalty scored) Tarrés; (penalty scored) Silva; (penalty scored) Vadócz; (penalty scored) Hélio; (penalty missed) Li Ngai Hoi; (penalty scored) Tong Kin Man; (penalty missed) Cancela

19 February 2019 Play-offs	Ulsan Hyundai (South Korea)	5–1	(Malaysia) Perak	Ulsan Munsu Football Stadium, Ulsan
19:30 UTC+9	Azhan 23' (o.g.); Diskerud 56', 58'; Lee Dong-kyeong 70'; Júnior 87'	Live Report; Stats Report	Naim 90'	Attendance: 2,178; Referee: Abdulrahman Al-Jassim (Qatar)
