= Jenius =

Jenius may refer to:

- Jenius Karib (born 1993), Malaysian footballer
- Jenius Bank, a former digital business of SMBC Group
- Jenius (album), by Paul Heaton, 2026

== See also ==
- Genius
