= Akmal Azmi =

Malaysian footballer

Personal information
- Full name: Akmal bin Azmi
- Date of birth: 9 April 1998 (age 28)
- Place of birth: Kedah, Malaysia
- Height: 1.69 m (5 ft 7 in)
- Position: Forward

Team information
- Current team: Langkawi City
- Number: 21

Youth career
- 2014–2017: Kedah U19
- 2018–2019: Kedah U21

Senior career*
Years	Team	Apps	(Gls)
2017–2019	Kedah	5	(0)
2020–	Langkawi City	0	(0)
- * Club domestic league appearances and goals as of 24 March 2020

Akmal bin Azmi (born 9 April 1998) is a Malaysian professional footballer who plays as a forward for Malaysia club Langkawi City in the Malaysia M3 League.

== Club career ==
On 15 July 2017, Akmal made his first-team debut for 2017 season coming on match against Selangor of 1–1 draw at Darul Aman.

== Career statistics ==
=== Club ===
As of 18 August 2018.

Appearances and goals by club, season and competition.
Club performance			League		FA Cup		Malaysia Cup		Continental (Note: Includes cup competitions such as the AFC Champions Cup, and AFC Cup)		Other		Total	
Season	Club	League	Apps	Goals	Apps	Goals	Apps	Goals	Apps	Goals	Apps	Goals	Apps	Goals
2017	Kedah	Malaysia Super League	3	0	0	0	0	0	–		0	0	3	0
2018	Kedah	Malaysia Super League	2	0	0	0	1	0	0	0	2 (Note: Appearances in Suramadu Super Cup)	0	5	0
Total			5	0	0	0	1	0	0	0	2	0	8	0
Career total			5	0	0	0	1	0	0	0	2	0	8	0
