= IKRAM Muda F.C. =

Malaysian football club

IKRAM Muda
- Full name: IKRAM Muda Football Club
- Founded: 30 March 2019; 6 years ago
- Ground: UM Arena
- Capacity: 1,500
- Owner: Pertubuhan IKRAM Malaysia
- Chairman: Ahmad Taqiyuddin Shahriman
- Coach: Hamdan Ibrahim
- League: Liga M3
- 2020: Liga M3 (season abandoned)

IKRAM Muda Football Club was a football club based in Kuala Lumpur, Malaysia. They last played in the third-tier Malaysia M3 League.

== History ==
The club was established on 30 March 2019. In 2019, IKRAM Muda was playing in the 4th division of Malaysian football league. While in the Liga M4, the club showed great improvement when they were Selangor Social Premier League runners-up, qualifying to play in the promotion play-off matches to the Liga M3. IKRAM Muda lost to KSR Sains in the final of the final, winning promotion to the 2020 Malaysia M3 League.

== Players (2020) ==
=== First-team squad ===
As of 1 March 2020

Note: Flags indicate national team as defined under FIFA eligibility rules; some limited exceptions apply. Players may hold more than one non-FIFA nationality.

No.	Pos.	Nation	Player
1	GK	(Malaysia) MAS	Nor Azmi Mustafa
2	DF	(Malaysia) MAS	Syed Muhd Nabil Syed Salleh
3	DF	(Malaysia) MAS	A.G.Ganesh a/l Govindasamy
4	DF	(Malaysia) MAS	Aliff Rose Hashidan
5	MF	(Malaysia) MAS	Azrul Razman
6	MF	(Malaysia) MAS	Aliff Mazlan
7	FW	(Malaysia) MAS	Ammar Shafiq Riduan
8	FW	(Malaysia) MAS	Aqmar Alias
9	MF	(Malaysia) MAS	Faes Hafize Fadzil
10	FW	(Malaysia) MAS	Fakhrulrazi Nordin
11	DF	(Malaysia) MAS	Fudzil Akmal Abu Bakar
12	DF	(Malaysia) MAS	Faiz Mokhtar
13	GK	(Malaysia) MAS	Syed Adney (captain)

No.	Pos.	Nation	Player
14	FW	(Malaysia) MAS	Ridhwan Johan
15	DF	(Malaysia) MAS	Amirul Asyraf Tajudin
16	MF	(Malaysia) MAS	Danial Suhaimi
17	FW	(Malaysia) MAS	Hafiz Emir Sherrifuddin
18	MF	(Malaysia) MAS	Syahmi Syakir Salim
19	FW	(Malaysia) MAS	Haziq Fikri Hussein
20	DF	(Malaysia) MAS	Azrul Syafiq Norinukartapati
22	GK	(Malaysia) MAS	Aiman Arif Abdul Ghani
23	DF	(Malaysia) MAS	Wan Hamizi Wan Ahmad
24	MF	(Malaysia) MAS	Rusyaidi Rodzi
25	MF	(Malaysia) MAS	Amir Hafiz Mohd Noor
26	DF	(Malaysia) MAS	Zulfadhlie A'ashri

== Club personnel ==
- Manager: Ahmad Taqiyuddin Shahriman
- Assistant manager:
- Head coach: Hamdan Ibrahim
- Assistant coach: Rajasparan a/l V. Naidu, Mohd Fauzan Yunos
- Physio: Mohd Zakhwan Abu Bakar

== Honours ==
=== League ===
- Division 4/M4 League
  - Runners-up: 2019
- Selangor Social Premier League
  - Runners-up: 2019
