= Langkawi City F.C. =

Malaysian football club

Langkawi City Football Club
- Full name: Langkawi City Football Club
- Nickname(s): The Island Boys
- Short name: LCFC
- Founded: 2017; 8 years ago, as Glory United; 2019; 6 years ago, as Langkawi Glory United; 2020; 5 years ago, as Langkawi City
- Dissolved: 2023
- Ground: Langkawi Stadium
- Capacity: 10,000
- Owner: Langkawi City Sdn. Bhd.
- President: Aizat Rohizan
- Head coach: Abdullah Hassan

Langkawi City Football Club is a Malaysian professional football club based in Langkawi, Kedah. The club's homeground has been the 10,000-seater Langkawi Stadium.

== History ==
Glory United was a club founded in 2017 in Shah Alam, Selangor and participated in several competitions in the Klang Valley.

In 2018, the club has won the Subang M5 League and become eligible to compete in the Malaysia M3 League.

=== Langkawi Glory United era ===
In 2019, the owner of Glory United was planning to set up a Langkawi-based club. An agreement was reached that Glory United FC officially moves to Langkawi, and gets renamed as Langkawi Glory United FC.

Langkawi Glory United FC failed to show impressive performance in the first season of the Malaysia M3 League when they finished 12th out of 14 teams competing.

=== Langkawi City FC era ===
After the 2019 season, Glory United owner agrees to sell the team, which was renamed again as Langkawi City F.C.

== Players (2020) ==
Note: Flags indicate national team as defined under FIFA eligibility rules; some limited exceptions apply. Players may hold more than one non-FIFA nationality.

No.	Pos.	Nation	Player
1	GK	(Malaysia) MAS	Mohd Nasril Nourdin
2	DF	(Malaysia) MAS	Azrul Azhar
4	DF	(Malaysia) MAS	Aliff Jamaluddin
5	DF	(Malaysia) MAS	Zaide Zain
6	DF	(Malaysia) MAS	Akmal Afizan
7	MF	(Malaysia) MAS	Zulhairi Aiman
8	DF	(Malaysia) MAS	K.Sathis
9	MF	(Malaysia) MAS	Mohd Syukur Saidin (captain)
10	MF	(Malaysia) MAS	Hasif Khalid
11	MF	(Malaysia) MAS	Shahrul Akmal (vice captain)
12	MF	(Malaysia) MAS	Shah Mustaqim
13	DF	(Malaysia) MAS	Daniel Aiman
14	MF	(Malaysia) MAS	Nor Hafizz
15	DF	(Malaysia) MAS	Zainudin Abidin

No.	Pos.	Nation	Player
16	MF	(Malaysia) MAS	Khairuddin Salleh
17	DF	(Malaysia) MAS	Akeemi Nazreen
20	DF	(Malaysia) MAS	Hasrul Che Halim
21	MF	(Malaysia) MAS	Akid Aiman
22	FW	(Malaysia) MAS	Afzal Nazri
23	GK	(Malaysia) MAS	Aiman Akwa
25	GK	(Malaysia) MAS	Mohd Firdaus Muhamad
27	FW	(Malaysia) MAS	Shazwan Salahuddin
29	FW	(Malaysia) MAS	Faizal Yusob
32	FW	(Malaysia) MAS	Mazlan Yahya
77	FW	(Malaysia) MAS	Akmal Azmi

== Season by season record ==
Season	Division	Position	Malaysia Cup	Malaysian FA Cup	Malaysian Charity Shield	Regional	Top scorer (all competitions)
2019	Liga M3	12th of 14	DNQ	Preliminary round	–	–	(Malaysia) Haikal Nazri (8) (Malaysia) Hattaphon Bun An (8)
2020^{1}	Liga M3	Season abandoned	DNQ	Round 2 (FA2)	–	–	(Nigeria) Michael Ijezie (2)
2022	Liga M3	8th of 10 (Group A); Relegated	DNQ	First round	–	–	(Malaysia) Mohd Faizal Yusob (4)

Notes:'

^1 2020 Season cancelled due to the COVID-19 pandemic, no promotion or league title was awarded.

== Kit manufacturer and shirt sponsor ==
Season	Manufacturer	Sponsor
2019	Lotto	Mai Langkawi
2020	Kaki Jersi	Berkat Hasrat Enterprise
2022	Fitech	LGK Sports International

== Club officials ==
=== Senior official ===
Position	Name
Honorary president	(Malaysia) Mahathir Mohamad
President	(Malaysia) Aizat Rohizan
Deputy president	(Malaysia) Uwais Rohizan
Chief Executive Officer	(Malaysia) Rohizan Abdullah

=== Team officials ===
Position	Name
Manager	(Malaysia) Dato' Armishah Siraj
Assistant manager	(Malaysia) Kapten (PA) Ahmad Shahfikri Darus
Head coach	(Malaysia) Abdullah Hassan
Assistant coach	(Malaysia) Abdul Ghani Long
GK coach	(Malaysia) Mohd Nasril Nourdin
Physiotherapist	(Malaysia) Mohd Idzham Siedeh
Media officer	(Malaysia) Amirul Syazuan Ibrahim
Kitman	(Malaysia) Norhizam Lazim
Kitman	(Malaysia) Seta Abidin Saad
Team coordinator	(Malaysia) Basri Ismail

=== Head coaches ===
Years	Name
2019	(Malaysia) Manja Man
2019	(Malaysia) Mohamad Ramlee
2020	(Chile) Nelson San Martin
2022-	(Malaysia) Abdullah Hassan

== Honours ==
=== League ===
- Subang Football League

(gold) Winners (1): 2018
