= BRM Kuala Kangsar F.C. =

Malaysian football club

- Full name: Kelab Bola Sepak BRM Kuala Kangsar
- Short name: BRM
- Founded: 2008; 18 years ago
- Ground: Kuala Kangsar Mini Stadium, Kuala Kangsar, Perak
- Capacity: 1,000
- Owner: Ghafari Nasir
- Head coach: Mohd Ali Khan Abdullah
- League: Malaysia M3 League (2022–2023)
- 2022: Malaysia M3 League, Semi-finalists

BRM Kuala Kangsar Football Club (Malay: Kelab Bola Sepak BRM Kuala Kangsar), commonly referred to as BRM FC or KK BRM FC, was a Malaysian semi-professional football club based in the royal town of Kuala Kangsar, Perak. The club last competed in the Malaysia M3 League, the third tier of the Malaysian football league system, before withdrawing mid-season in June 2023 due to financial difficulties.

== History ==
=== Grassroots beginnings and registration (2008–2021) ===
The club was originally established in 2008 as an amateur community team under the name Budak Rumah Murah FC, composed primarily of local players from the Kuala Kangsar District. Throughout the 2010s, the team participated in district-level competitions in Perak, finishing as runners-up in the Kuala Kangsar League in 2016 and 2017, and securing third place in 2018.

In 2019, the club was formally registered with the Malaysian Sports Commissioner (Pesuruhjaya Sukan Malaysia) as a sports entity to pursue entry into national competitions. Under the ownership of chief executive officer Ghafari Nasir, the club affiliated with the Kuala Kangsar District Football Association (Persatuan Bolasepak Daerah Kuala Kangsar) and prepared to enter the third-tier Malaysia M3 League.

=== National debut and Malaysia FA Cup run (2022) ===
BRM FC made its debut in the national football pyramid during the 2022 season. Ahead of the campaign, the club recruited several experienced former Malaysia Super League players including goalkeeper Kamarul Effandi, defenders Aziz Ismail and Noor Hazrul Mustafa, and midfielders Fazrul Hazli and Nazrin Nawi to bolster its squad under head coach Mohd Ali Khan Abdullah

In March 2022, BRM FC defeated Tun Razak City FC 2–1 in the qualifying round of the 2022 Malaysia FA Cup, with Khairul Asyraf Sahizah scoring twice. The victory earned the club a first-round fixture against reigning Super League champions Johor Darul Ta'zim (JDT) at the Sultan Ibrahim Stadium on 13 March 2022, where BRM FC suffered a 10–0 defeat. In league play, BRM FC enjoyed a successful debut season, advancing to the semi-finals of the 2022 Malaysia M3 League.

=== Sponsorship issues and withdrawal (2023) ===
Prior to the 2023 Malaysia M3 League season (rebranded as the MBSB Bank Championship), BRM FC held a pre-season carnival and jersey launch at the Kuala Kangsar Mini Stadium, officiated by Deputy Youth and Sports Minister, Adam Adli. However, in February 2023, the club announced it might withdraw from the league after regulations prohibited it from displaying the branding of its main sponsor, an electronic cigarette (vape) company, resulting in a major loss of projected revenue.

Although the club ultimately started the 2023 campaign, ongoing financial constraints persisted after sponsors failed to fulfill funding commitments. In the 2023 Malaysia FA Cup, BRM FC was eliminated in the first round following a 1–0 loss to Immigration on 25 March 2023. On 19 June 2023, after playing nine league matches (recording two wins and seven losses), the club submitted an official withdrawal letter to the Amateur Football League (AFL). On 20 June 2023, AFL chairman Mohd Yusoff Mahadi confirmed BRM FC's exit and announced that all of the club's 2023 league results, points, and goals were expunged from the standings.

== Stadium ==
BRM FC played its home matches at the Kuala Kangsar Mini Stadium (Stadium Mini Kuala Kangsar) in Kuala Kangsar, Perak, and occasionally utilized the Manjung Municipal Council Stadium (Stadium Majlis Perbandaran Manjung) for national cup fixtures.

== Players (2022) ==
Note: Flags indicate national team as defined under FIFA eligibility rules; some limited exceptions apply. Players may hold more than one non-FIFA nationality.

No.	Pos.	Nation	Player
1	GK	MAS	Miqdad Hanizam
2	MF	MAS	Shafiq Abdul Malek
4	DF	MAS	Haiqal Afendi Norizat Anuar
5	MF	MAS	Azrul Amrie Zohri
6	MF	MAS	Muhammad Hanis Mohtar
7	FW	MAS	Azmawi Farhan Azhari
8	MF	MAS	Amir Rafiq Ismail
10	FW	MAS	Abdul Razak Mastor
11	MF	MAS	Nuriqmal Tumin
13	FW	MAS	Ahmad Fakri Saarani
15	DF	MAS	Youwarasan a/l Maniom
16	MF	MAS	Rosdi Abu Said
17	MF	MAS	Norfiqrie Talib

No.	Pos.	Nation	Player
18	DF	MAS	Hijjaz Hakimi
19	FW	MAS	Noor Hazrul Mustafa
20	MF	MAS	Faiz Hanif Adnan
21	MF	MAS	Huzaimi Mokhtar
23	DF	MAS	Haikal Mohamad Nazri
24	MF	MAS	Rusydan Wahid Anuar
27	MF	MAS	Nazirul Afif
28	GK	MAS	Kamarul Effandi
29	DF	MAS	Arshie Adzim
30	MF	MAS	Taqber Mukmin
32	MF	MAS	Fikri Sudin
42	GK	MAS	Syakir Danial
45	DF	MAS	Ikmal Hisham Saufian
48	FW	MAS	Khairul Asyraf Sahizah

== Coaching and management staff ==
During its final active seasons in the Malaysia M3 League (2022–2023), the club's management and technical staff included:

- Chief Executive Officer: Ghafari Nasir
- Team Manager: Muhammad Aliff Noor Azman
- Head Coach: Mohd Ali Khan Abdullah
- Assistant Coach: Ayub Abdul Samad
- Goalkeeping Coach: Zambri Mat Arif
- Team Doctor: Siew Qui Hen
- Physiotherapist: Aiman Abdul Rahman
- Kit Manager: Dzul Amali Bahari

== Notable former players ==
The following notable players represented BRM Kuala Kangsar F.C. during its semi-professional tenure:

- Kamarul Effandi
- Aziz Ismail
- Noor Hazrul Mustafa
- Syazwan Tajuddin
- Nazrin Nawi
- Fazrul Hazli
- Khairul Izuan Rosli

== Honours ==
=== District ===
- Kuala Kangsar Premier League

Winners (1): 2018

- Kuala Kangsar District League

Runners-up (2): 2016, 2017
Third place (1): 2018

=== National ===
- Malaysia M3 League

Third place (1): 2022
