= Sabri Sahar =

Malaysian footballer

Personal information
- Full name: Sabri bin Sahar
- Date of birth: 1 September 1992 (age 34)
- Place of birth: Sabah, Malaysia
- Height: 1.70 m (5 ft 7 in)
- Position: Midfielder

Team information
- Current team: Kinabalu Jaguar F.C.
- Number: 18

Youth career
- Sabah

Senior career*
Years	Team	Apps	(Gls)
2011–2014	Sabah	20	(0)
2015	Sarawak	0	(0)
2016	Negeri Sembilan	0	(0)
2017–2022	Sabah	35	(3)
2021–2022	→ Sarawak United (loan)	4	(0)
2022–	→ Kinabalu Jaguar F.C.	38	(2)
- * Club domestic league appearances and goals as of 26 August 2022

Sabri bin Sahar (born 1 September 1992) is a Malaysian professional footballer who plays as a midfielder for Malaysia M3 League club Kinabalu Jaguar.
