= Hilal El-Helwe =

Association football player (born 1994)

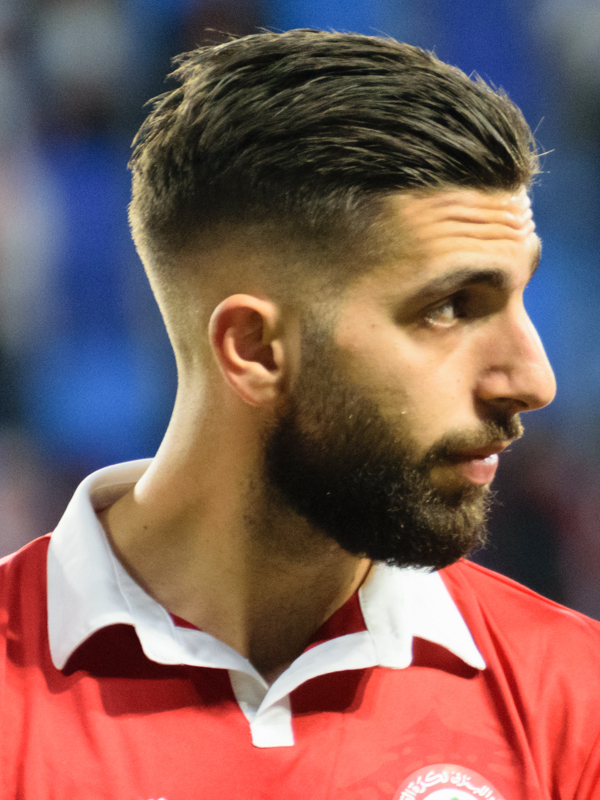
- El-Helwe with Lebanon in 2019

Personal information
- Full name: Hilal Bassam El-Helwe
- Date of birth: 24 November 1994 (age 31)
- Place of birth: Hanover, Germany
- Height: 1.87 m (6 ft 2 in)
- Positions: Forward; winger

Team information
- Current team: FC 08 Homburg
- Number: 10

Youth career
- –2008: Hannover 96
- 2008–2010: TSV Havelse
- 2010–2012: SC Langenhagen
- 2012–2013: TSV Havelse

Senior career*
Years	Team	Apps	(Gls)
2013–2015	TSV Havelse	59	(16)
2015–2016	VfL Wolfsburg II	22	(7)
2016–2018	Hallescher FC	55	(4)
2018–2019	Apollon Smyrnis	21	(3)
2019–2021	SV Meppen	38	(7)
2021	Al-Faisaly	3	(0)
2021–2022	Ahed	8	(4)
2022	Penang	19	(5)
2023–2024	Bourj	19	(7)
2024–2025	SGV Freiberg	31	(12)
2025–	FC 08 Homburg	20	(8)

International career^{‡}
2015–2024	Lebanon	53	(9)
- * Club domestic league appearances and goals as of 24 September 2026 ‡ National team caps and goals as of 30 January 2024

Hilal Bassam El-Helwe (Arabic: هلال بسام الحلوة, Lebanese Arabic pronunciation: [ˈhleːl basˈseːm lˈħɪlwe]; born 24 November 1994) is a professional footballer who plays as a forward or winger for German club FC 08 Homburg. Born in Germany, El-Helwe has played for the Lebanon national team.

After playing for five years in Germany for TSV Havelse, VfL Wolfsburg II, and Hallescher FC, El-Helwe moved to Greek club Apollon Smyrnis in 2018. He returned to Germany in 2019, signing for SV Meppen, with whom he played for two years. El-Helwe then moved to Asia in 2021, playing for Al-Faisaly in Jordan, Ahed in Lebanon, Penang in Malaysia, and Bourj in Lebanon. In 2024, El-Helwe returned to Germany and played for SGV Freiberg and FC 08 Homburg.

El-Helwe made his international debut for Lebanon in 2015. He scored a brace against North Korea in the 2019 AFC Asian Cup, helping Lebanon win their first-ever game in the competition.

== Early life ==
El-Helwe was born to Lebanese parents in Germany; his father had moved to Germany aged seven. El-Helwe has relatives living in Lebanon.

== Club career ==
=== TSV Havelse ===
Coming through the youth system, El-Helwe debuted for the senior side of TSV Havelse on 31 August 2013 coming on as a substitute in a 3–2 defeat to Eintracht Braunschweig II. His first goal in the Regionalliga Nord came on 27 October of the same year, scoring the equalizing goal against SV Wilhelmshaven on the 14th minute. He ended his first season at the club with six goals in 26 league games.

In his second season, El-Helwe scored his first domestic brace on 10 October 2014 against Schwarz-Weiß Rehden. He improved on his previous tally scoring 10 goals in 33 appearances for the club, earning him a move to VfL Wolfsburg II the following season.

=== VfL Wolfsburg II ===
On 5 September 2015, El-Helwe debuted for VfL Wolfsburg II against his former side TSV Havelse in a 6–1 win, coming on as a substitute on the 65th minute. On 1 November 2015, he scored his first goal for the side against Borussia Hildesheim in a 5–1 away win.

El-Helwe played a total of 22 league games for the side, scoring seven and assisting seven in the process. He helped Wolfsburg win the Regionalliga Nord, and played two promotion play-off games against Jahn Regensburg, losing 2–1 on aggregate.

=== Hallescher FC ===
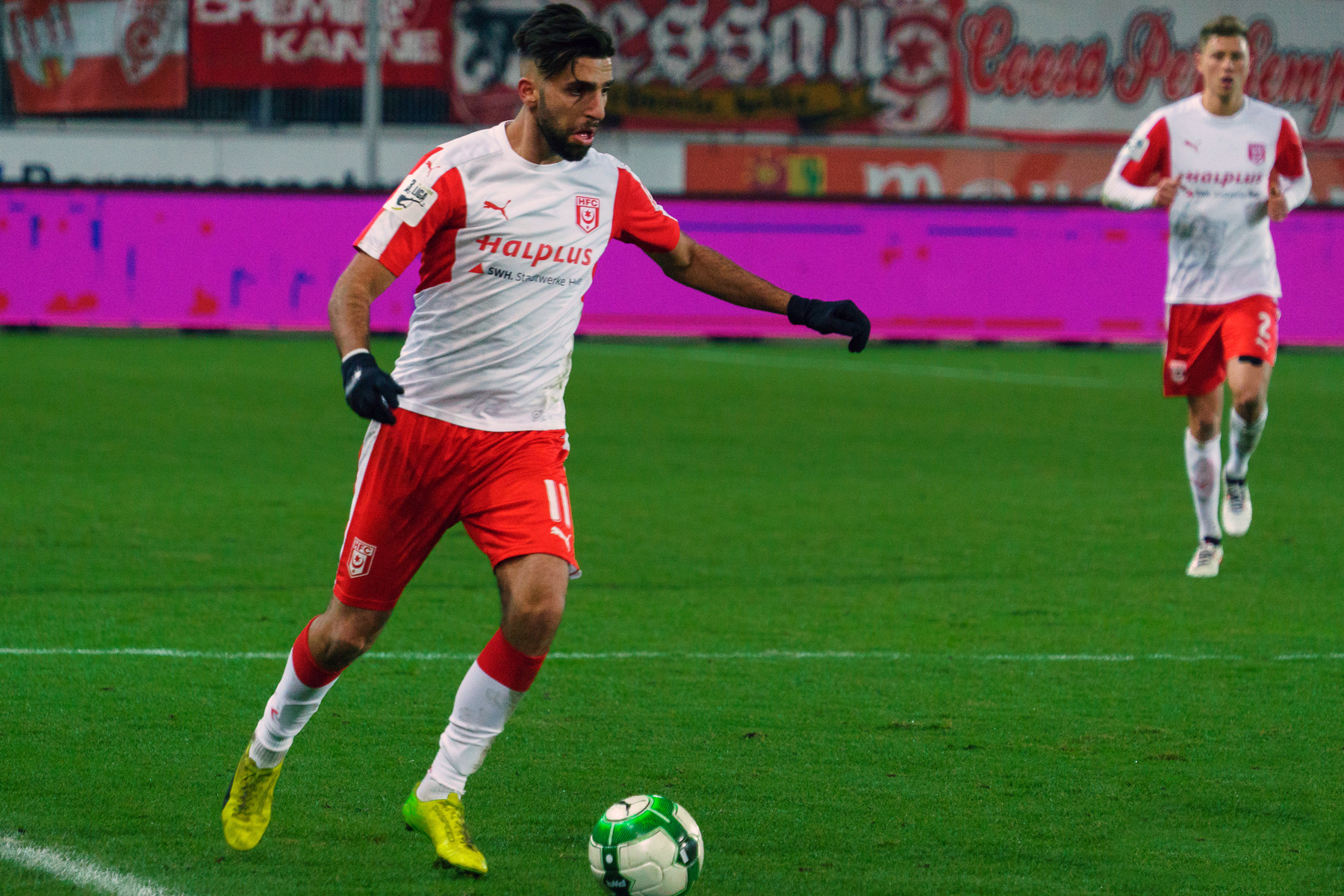
El-Helwe with Hallescher FC in 2017

On 22 June 2016, 3. Liga side Hallescher FC announced the acquisition of El-Helwe from VfL Wolfsburg II on a two-year contract. On 6 August 2016, he played his first league match at home against Chemnitzer FC in a 1–1 draw, coming on as a substitute for Sascha Pfeffer on the 78th minute. El-Helwe's first goals for the club came in the form of a brace at the DFB Pokal game against 1. FC Kaiserslautern on 20 August 2016, scoring two goals in four minutes in a 4–3 win.

In the following season, El-Helwe scored his first league goal for the club on 22 July 2017 in the first match of the season, scoring in the 73rd minute against SC Paderborn after coming off the bench in a 4–4 draw. El-Helwe scored a total of four league goals for Halle, all during the 2017–18 season.

=== Apollon Smyrnis ===
With his contract expiring, El-Helwe joined Super League Greece side Apollon Smyrnis on a free transfer for the 2018–19 season. El-Helwe's first goal for the club, which came on 15 September 2018, was also Apollon Smyrnis' first of the season, scoring a late consolation goal against PAS Giannina in a 2–1 defeat. On 23 February 2019, El-Helwe scored the equalizer against defending champions AEK, with the match ending 2–1 to the opposing team. Despite finishing last in the league, El-Helwe was Apollon Smyrnis' top scorer in the 2018–19 season with three goals and one assist in 21 appearances.

=== SV Meppen ===
On 3 July 2019, 3. Liga side SV Meppen announced the signing of El-Helwe on a free transfer, with his contract valid until 2021. His first goal came on 3 November 2019, scoring against Bayern Munich II in a 5–3 home win. On 12 June 2020, El-Helwe scored against his former club Hallescher FC coming on as a substitute. Despite him equalising the score 1–1, the match ended in a 3–2 loss.

In the last two matchdays of the 2019–20 season, on 1 and 4 July 2020, El-Helwe scored two goals and assisted one. He scored a goal against Preußen Münster in a 3–0 away win, and scored and assisted one against Eintracht Braunschewig, helping his side win 4–3. El-Helwe finished the season with five goals and three assists in 27 games, averaging a contribution every 144 minutes; SV Meppen finished in 7th place of out 20.

El-Helwe scored his first goal of the 2020–21 season on 3 October 2020, in a 2–1 home defeat to Verl. He agreed the termination of his contract with SV Meppen on 25 February 2021.

=== Al-Faisaly ===
On 1 March 2021, El-Helwe joined Jordanian Pro League club Al-Faisaly. He made his debut on 4 March, coming on as a 75th-minute substitute in a Jordan FA Shield game against Al-Ramtha which ended in a 2–2 draw. El-Helwe's league debut came on 10 April, in a 2–2 draw against Sahab.

Following his international duty with the Lebanon national team, El-Helwe returned to Jordan on 24 June; however, he refused to attend the training session, and looked to break his contract with the club following financial disagreements.

=== Ahed ===
On 16 July 2021, Lebanese Premier League side Ahed announced the signing of El-Helwe, on a six-month contract. Having made his debut on 13 September, as a starter in a 1–0 win against Tripoli, El-Helwe's first goals for Ahed came on 6 November, scoring twice to help his side beat Sporting 2–0. He scored six goals in 11 games in all competitions for Ahed.

=== Penang ===
On 17 February 2022, El-Helwe joined Malaysia Super League side Penang. His first goal for Penang came on 9 April, scoring a penalty in a 1–1 draw against Negeri Sembilan. On 14 May, El-Helwe scored a brace against second-tier side Perak in the second round of the Malaysia FA Cup, via a penalty and a free kick, to help Penang win 4–1 and progress to the quarter-finals. He scored another brace in the quarter-finals, against Sri Pahang, to qualify his team to the semi-finals.

El-Helwe terminated his contract with Penang by mutual consent on 20 October, prior to the start of the 2022 Malaysia Cup the following week. He left the club with five goals and two assists in 19 league games.

=== Bourj ===
On 23 July 2023, El-Helwe signed for Bourj in the Lebanese Premier League. Having made his debut for Bourj in the first matchday of the 2023–24 season, on 5 August 2023, as a 57th-minute substitute in a 1–0 win against Tripoli, El-Helwe scored a brace the following game one week later, helping Bourj beat Chabab Ghazieh 4–0. He scored once again the next matchday on 20 August, in the form of an 84th-minute equalizer against Racing Beirut. El-Helwe finished the 2023–24 season with seven goals one assist in 19 league games.

=== Return to Germany ===
On 25 July 2024, El-Helwe returned to Germany signing for Regionalliga Südwest club SGV Freiberg. He played 31 games in the 2024–25 season, scoring 12 goals and providing seven assists.

On 5 June 2025, El-Helwe signed for Regionalliga Südwest rivals FC 08 Homburg on a two-year contract. On 6 July 2025, El-Helwe picked up an injury during a pre-season game against FC Augsburg II, described as an "ankle fracture with ligament involvement", and was sidelined for four to six months.

== International career ==
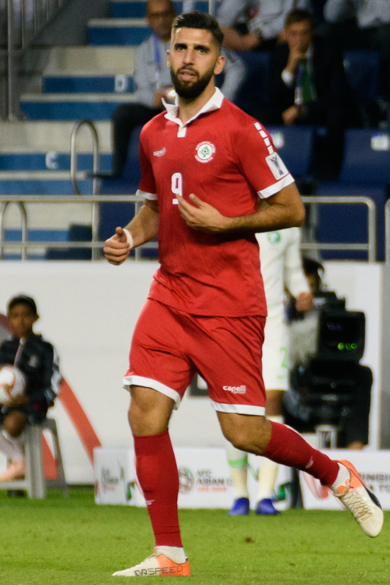
El-Helwe with Lebanon during the 2019 AFC Asian Cup game against Saudi Arabia

On 8 October 2015, El-Helwe made his debut for the Lebanon national team, starting in a 2018 FIFA World Cup qualifying 2–0 win against Myanmar. He played as a starter, and was subbed out after 56 minutes. El-Helwe scored his first international goal on 29 March 2016, in Lebanon's home match against Myanmar in the qualifiers, securing a 1–1 draw for his team in the 88th minute.

In December 2018, he was called up for the 2019 AFC Asian Cup squad, and played in all three group stage games. On 17 January 2019, during the last game against North Korea, he scored a volley in the 65th minute thanks to a cross by Mohamad Haidar to put Lebanon in the lead. In the seventh minute of added time, he scored a second volley ending the encounter in a 4–1 win and giving Lebanon their first ever win in the Asian Cup.

On 23 June 2021, El-Helwe scored a volley in a 2021 FIFA Arab Cup qualification match against Djibouti to help Lebanon win 1–0 and qualify for the final tournament.

In December 2023, El-Helwe was included in the Lebanese squad for the 2023 AFC Asian Cup.

== Style of play ==
El-Helwe is a versatile striker who can also play as a winger on both sides. Notwithstanding his height of 1.86 m (6.1 ft), which makes him good at holding play, he is a quick player who runs in behind the defence. El-Helwe is also a good finisher in the box. SV Meppen's sporting director, Heiner Beckmann, described El-Helwe as "physically strong, quick and very versatile in attack" upon signing for the club in 2019.

== Career statistics ==
=== Club ===
As of match played 22 August 2026

Appearances and goals by club, season and competition
Club	Season	League			National cup (Note: Includes DFB-Pokal, Greek Cup, Jordan FA Cup, Lebanese FA Cup, Malaysia FA Cup)		League cup (Note: Includes Jordan FA Shield, Lebanese Elite Cup, Malaysia Cup, Lebanese Federation Cup)		Continental		Other		Total	
Club	Season	Division	Apps	Goals	Apps	Goals	Apps	Goals	Apps	Goals	Apps	Goals	Apps	Goals
TSV Havelse	2013–14	Regionalliga Nord	26	6	—		—		—		—		26	6
TSV Havelse	2014–15	Regionalliga Nord	33	10	—		—		—		3 (Note: Appearance(s) in Lower Saxony Cup)	1	36	11
TSV Havelse	Total		59	16	0	0	0	0	0	0	3	1	62	17
VfL Wolfsburg II	2015–16	Regionalliga Nord	22	7	—		—		—		2 (Note: Appearances in Regionalliga promotion play-offs)	0	24	7
Hallescher FC	2016–17	3. Liga	25	0	1	2	—		—		1 (Note: Appearance in Saxony-Anhalt Cup)	1	27	3
Hallescher FC	2017–18	3. Liga	30	4	—		—		—		—		30	4
Hallescher FC	Total		55	4	1	2	0	0	0	0	1	1	57	7
Apollon Smyrnis	2018–19	Super League Greece	21	3	4	1	—		—		—		25	4
SV Meppen	2019–20	3. Liga	27	5	—		—		—		1	0	28	5
SV Meppen	2020–21	3. Liga	11	2	—		—		—		—		11	2
SV Meppen	Total		38	7	0	0	0	0	0	0	1	0	39	7
Al-Faisaly	2021	Jordanian Pro League	3	0	0	0	2	0	3 (Note: Appearance(s) in AFC Cup)	0	—		8	0
Ahed	2021–22	Lebanese Premier League	8	4	2	2	0	0	1	0	—		11	6
Penang	2022	Malaysia Super League	19	5	4	4	—		—		—		23	9
Bourj	2023–24	Lebanese Premier League	19	7	0	0	—		—		—		19	7
SGV Freiberg	2024–25	Regionalliga Südwest	31	12	—		—		—		3 (Note: Appearances in Württemberg Cup)	0	34	12
FC 08 Homburg	2025–26	Regionalliga Südwest	13	5	0	0	—		—		4 (Note: Appearances in Saarland Cup)	2	17	7
FC 08 Homburg	2026–27	Regionalliga Südwest	2	1	—		—		—		—		2	1
FC 08 Homburg	Total		15	6	0	0	0	0	0	0	4	2	19	8
Career total			290	71	11	9	2	0	4	0	14	4	321	84

=== International ===
As of match played 22 January 2024

Appearances and goals by national team and year
National team	Year	Apps	Goals
Lebanon	2015	2	0
Lebanon	2016	7	1
Lebanon	2017	5	1
Lebanon	2018	4	1
Lebanon	2019	9	5
Lebanon	2020	0	0
Lebanon	2021	13	1
Lebanon	2022	4	0
Lebanon	2023	5	0
Lebanon	2024	4	0
Total		53	9

Scores and results list Lebanon's goal tally first, score column indicates score after each El-Helwe goal.

List of international goals scored by Hilal El-Helwe
No.	Date	Venue	Opponent	Score	Result	Competition
1	29 March 2016	Saida Municipal Stadium, Sidon, Lebanon	Myanmar	1–1	1–1	2018 FIFA World Cup qualification
2	10 October 2017	Camille Chamoun Sports City Stadium, Beirut, Lebanon	North Korea	1–0	5–0	2019 AFC Asian Cup qualification
3	27 March 2018	Camille Chamoun Sports City Stadium, Beirut, Lebanon	Malaysia	2–1	2–1	2019 AFC Asian Cup qualification
4	17 January 2019	Sharjah Stadium, Sharjah, United Arab Emirates	North Korea	2–1	4–1	2019 AFC Asian Cup
5	17 January 2019	Sharjah Stadium, Sharjah, United Arab Emirates	North Korea	4–1	4–1	2019 AFC Asian Cup
6	10 October 2019	Camille Chamoun Sports City Stadium, Beirut, Lebanon	Turkmenistan	1–0	2–1	2022 FIFA World Cup qualification
7	15 October 2019	Colombo Racecourse, Colombo, Sri Lanka	Sri Lanka	2–0	3–0	2022 FIFA World Cup qualification
8	15 October 2019	Colombo Racecourse, Colombo, Sri Lanka	Sri Lanka	3–0	3–0	2022 FIFA World Cup qualification
9	23 June 2021	Khalifa International Stadium, Doha, Qatar	Djibouti	1–0	1–0	2021 FIFA Arab Cup qualification

== Honours ==
VfL Wolfsburg II

- Regionalliga Nord: 2015–16

Ahed

- Lebanese Premier League: 2021–22
- Lebanese Elite Cup runner-up: 2021

== See also ==
- List of Lebanon international footballers
- List of Lebanon international footballers born outside Lebanon
