= Leopold Alphonso =

Malaysian footballer

Personal information
- Full name: Leopold Alphonso Otong
- Date of birth: 9 June 1991 (age 35)
- Place of birth: Sabah, Malaysia
- Height: 1.69 m (5 ft 7 in)
- Position: Forward

Team information
- Current team: Kinabalu Jaguar FC
- Number: 17

Youth career
- 2008–: Sabah FA President Cup Team's

Senior career*
Years	Team	Apps	(Gls)
2009–2014	Sabah FA	48	(19)
2013–2014	Cebagoo FC	14	(2)
2015—2020	Sabah FA	32	(8)
2020—	Kinabalu Jaguar F.C.	38	(6)
- * Club domestic league appearances and goals as of 3 February 2022 ‡ National team caps and goals as of 3 February 2022

Leopold Alphonso Otong (born 9 June 1991) is a Malaysian footballer playing for Sabah FA and currently playing for Kinabalu Jaguar F.C. in Malaysia M3 League.

A former Bukit Jalil Sports School trainee, Leopold made his debut for Sabah in the match against Sinar Dimaja Mai Sarah FC. He also score his first Malaysian League goal in that match.

== Honours ==
=== Club ===
Sabah

- Malaysia Premier League

Promotion: 2010

- Malaysia Premier League

2019
