= 2019 Malaysia M4 League =

Malaysia M4 League
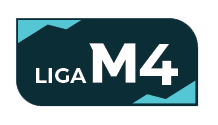
- Season: 2019
- Champions: KSR SAINS
- Promoted: KSR SAINS; Ikram Muda

The 2019 Malaysia M4 League (Malay: 2019 Liga M4 Malaysia) was the inaugural season of the League competition since its establishment in 2019. It is in the fourth tier of the Malaysia football league system.

== Liga Melaka Division 1 ==
=== Group A ===
Pos	Team	Pld	W	D	L	GF	GA	GD	Pts	Qualification
1	MBMB Warriors (C, Q)	4	3	0	1	8	1	+7	9	Knockout Stage and Qualification to Play-off round
2	Perma	4	3	0	1	6	3	+3	9	Knockout Stage
3	Pulau Sebang	4	1	2	1	2	3	−1	5	
4	Hulubalang	4	1	1	2	3	3	0	4	
5	Masjid Tanah (R)	4	0	1	3	1	10	−9	1	Religation to Division 2

Source: Liga Melaka
Rules for classification: 1) Points; 2) Goal difference; 3) Number of goals scored.
(C) Champions; (Q) Qualified for the phase indicated; (R) Relegated

=== Group B ===
Pos	Team	Pld	W	D	L	GF	GA	GD	Pts	Qualification
1	Andalas	5	5	0	0	14	2	+12	15	Knockout Stage
2	SAMB II	5	4	0	1	12	6	+6	12	Knockout Stage
3	Tampoi	5	2	1	2	8	8	0	7	
4	Pengkalan	5	2	1	2	8	11	−3	7	
5	Gerakan	5	1	0	4	7	12	−5	3	
6	Teman FM (R)	5	0	0	5	5	14	−9	0	Religation to Division 2

Source: Liga Melaka
Rules for classification: 1) Points; 2) Goal difference; 3) Number of goals scored.
(R) Relegated

== KLFA Super League ==
Pos	Team	Pld	W	D	L	GF	GA	GD	Pts	Promotion, qualification or relegation
1	Immigration	9	7	0	2	24	10	+14	21	
2	Cheras Perdana (Q)	9	6	2	1	20	9	+11	20	Qualification to Play-off round
3	DRB-Hicom	9	6	2	1	17	7	+10	20	
4	Tentera Darat	9	5	3	1	23	9	+14	18	
5	Kilat KL	9	5	3	1	16	5	+11	18	
6	JLJ Diraja	9	3	3	3	18	14	+4	12	
7	TUDM Hornets	9	2	1	6	14	22	−8	7	
8	PLUS	9	2	1	6	7	18	−11	7	
9	BSN (R)	9	1	1	7	7	28	−21	4	Relegation to Division 1
10	Panthers United (R)	9	0	0	9	4	29	−25	0	Relegation to Division 1

Source: KLFA Super League
Rules for classification: 1) Points; 2) Goal difference; 3) Number of goals scored.
(Q) Qualified for the phase indicated; (R) Relegated

== Liga THB-KFA ==
=== North Zone ===
Pos	Team	Pld	W	D	L	GF	GA	GD	Pts	Promotion, qualification or relegation
1	Suka Menanti (C)	9	8	1	0	28	3	+25	25	Advance to Knock-out stage
2	THB Wanderers	9	8	0	1	45	3	+42	24	
3	Padang Terap Jr.	9	5	2	2	19	13	+6	17	
4	Pokok Sena	9	5	2	2	15	11	+4	17	
5	MPKP	9	4	1	4	28	18	+10	13	
6	KIFA-MSIK	9	4	0	5	16	22	−6	12	
7	PG	9	3	2	4	19	16	+3	11	
8	Kubang Rotan	9	3	0	6	14	44	−30	9	
9	ILP Jitra	9	1	0	8	8	37	−29	3	
10	Pendidikan	9	0	0	9	0	28	−28	0	

Source: Liga THB-KFA
Rules for classification: 1) Points; 2) Goal difference; 3) Number of goals scored.
(C) Champions

=== South Zone ===
Pos	Team	Pld	W	D	L	GF	GA	GD	Pts	Promotion, qualification or relegation
1	Peqedu	9	8	0	1	23	10	+13	24	Advance to Knock-out stage
2	MPKK	9	7	1	1	15	4	+11	22	
3	Yan	9	4	3	2	13	8	+5	15	
4	Belantik City	9	4	3	2	16	13	+3	15	
5	Baling MDB	9	4	1	4	18	16	+2	13	
6	TLJ	9	4	0	5	13	15	−2	12	
7	19 RAMD ATM	8	3	2	3	12	9	+3	11	
8	Arena	9	2	2	5	13	19	−6	8	
9	Padang Serai	9	1	1	7	6	15	−9	4	
10	POLIMAS	8	0	1	7	2	20	−18	1	

Source: Liga THB-KFA
Rules for classification: 1) Points; 2) Goal difference; 3) Number of goals scored.

== Subang Football League ==
Pos	Team	Pld	W	D	L	GF	GA	GD	Pts	Qualification or relegation
1	MPKJ (Q)	9	7	2	0	33	5	+28	23	Qualification for Selangor Champion League
2	KRU II	9	6	2	1	28	5	+23	20	
3	Palitus (Q)	9	6	1	2	23	10	+13	19	Qualification to Play-off round
4	X-Star	9	5	0	4	15	10	+5	15	
5	KXSLiquid USTT	9	4	2	3	11	9	+2	14	
6	PJH FC	9	3	3	3	14	14	0	12	
7	Ingress United	9	3	2	4	15	9	+6	11	
8	KL Cityboys	9	2	1	6	13	24	−11	7	
9	Level Up Gators	9	2	1	6	12	24	−12	7	
10	Wild Bear	9	0	0	9	4	59	−55	0	

Source: SFL
Rules for classification: 1) Points; 2) Goal difference; 3) Number of goals scored.
(Q) Qualified for the phase indicated

== Terengganu Amateur League ==
=== Super League ===
Pos	Team	Pld	W	D	L	GF	GA	GD	Pts	Qualification
1	Besut United	9	7	2	0	19	6	+13	23	Qualification to TAL Cup
2	PBSMT	9	5	3	1	19	9	+10	18	Qualification to TAL Cup
3	Markless ST	9	4	4	1	21	9	+12	16	Qualification to TAL Cup
4	Real Chukai	9	5	1	3	19	16	+3	16	Qualification to TAL Cup & Qualification to Play-off round
5	BTK CG Jaya	9	2	4	3	10	10	0	10	
6	Suhada FC	9	1	4	4	9	14	−5	7	
7	Che Nordin	9	3	1	5	11	19	−8	10	
8	FC Permanis	9	2	3	4	9	20	−11	9	
9	Island FC	9	0	7	2	9	12	−3	7	
10	Myxini Kuala Berang	9	0	3	6	7	17	−10	3	

Source: Official Website
Rules for classification: 1) Points; 2) Goal difference; 3) Number of goals scored.

=== Premier League ===
Pos	Team	Pld	W	D	L	GF	GA	GD	Pts	Qualification
1	Kerteh F.C. (P, Q)	8	5	1	2	18	13	+5	16	Qualification to TAL Cup
2	Delima Warriors F.C. (Q)	8	4	3	1	16	8	+8	15	Qualification to TAL Cup
3	Gemuda F.C.	8	4	2	2	11	7	+4	14	Play-offs round
4	Hulu Fighters F.C.	8	3	3	2	12	11	+1	12	Play-offs round
5	NFFC	8	3	2	3	13	14	−1	11	
6	Raja Permin F.C.	8	3	2	3	11	12	−1	11	
7	UniSZA Rangers	8	2	2	4	10	11	−1	8	
8	CK Bintang Muda F.C.	8	2	1	5	11	21	−10	7	
9	Sentul Patah F.C.	8	2	0	6	7	12	−5	6	
10	Paka City F.C.	0	0	0	0	0	0	0	0	Club resigned and folded

Source: Official Website
Rules for classification: 1) Points; 2) Goal difference; 3) Number of goals scored.
(P) Promoted; (Q) Qualified for the phase indicated

=== TAL Cup ===
Quarter-finals
Besut United	2
Gemuda	0
Markless ST	3
Delima Warriors	0
PBSMT	2
Hulu Fighters	1
Real Chukai	1
Kerteh F.C.	5

Semi-finals
Besut United	0
Markless ST	3
PBSMT	1
Kerteh F.C.	2

Final
Markless ST	0 (3)
Kerteh F.C.	0 (4)

==== Quarter-final ====
3 January 2020	Markless ST	3 − 0	Delima Warriors	Kuala Terengganu
15:45 UTC+8				Stadium: Padang A, Kompleks Sukan Gong Badak

3 January 2020	Real Chukai	1 − 5	Kerteh F.C.	Kemaman
21:00 UTC+8				Stadium: Mak Chilli Stadium

10 January 2020	Besut United	2 − 0	Gemuda	Kuala Terengganu
15:45 UTC+8				Stadium: Padang A, Kompleks Sukan Gong Badak

10 January 2020	PBSMT	2 − 1	Hulu Fighters	Kuala Terengganu
15:45 UTC+8				Stadium: Padang B, Kompleks Sukan Gong Badak

==== Semi-final ====
17 January 2020	Besut United	0 − 3	Markless ST	Kuala Terengganu
15:45 UTC+8				Stadium: Sultan Ismail Nasiruddin Shah Stadium

19 January 2020	PBSMT	1−2 (a.e.t.)	Kerteh F.C.	Kuala Terengganu
21:00 UTC+8				Stadium: Sultan Ismail Nasiruddin Shah Stadium

==== Final ====
7 February 2020
21:00 UTC+8

Markless ST	0 − 0 (a.e.t.)	Kerteh F.C.
Penalties
	3 – 4

Sultan Ismail Nasiruddin Shah Stadium, Kuala Terengganu

== MAHSA M4 League ==
MAHSA M4 League
- Season: 2019
- Champions: JARR
- Promoted: JARR

Pos	Team	Pld	W	D	L	GF	GA	GD	Pts	Qualification or relegation
1	JARR (Q)	14	10	4	0	47	14	+33	34	Qualification to Play-off round
2	Mercu	14	9	5	0	53	21	+32	32	
3	XHICOM	14	9	3	2	48	14	+34	30	
4	BSP	14	6	1	7	29	30	−1	19	
5	BPP PLUS	14	3	5	6	23	39	−16	14	
6	MARS	14	3	4	7	22	37	−15	13	
7	Southern	14	2	2	10	20	43	−23	8	
8	LB	14	0	2	12	9	59	−50	2	

Source: MAHSA M4 League
Rules for classification: 1) Points; 2) Goal difference; 3) Number of goals scored.
(Q) Qualified for the phase indicated

== Alumni M4 League ==
Pos	Team	Pld	W	D	L	GF	GA	GD	Pts
1	Ansara Kuantan (C)	8	7	1	0	30	3	+27	22
2	Andersonian	8	6	0	2	22	5	+17	18
3	Ansara KB	8	6	1	1	21	7	+14	19
4	STAROBA	8	5	2	1	24	10	+14	17
5	SJAA	8	3	0	5	19	18	+1	9
6	VIOBA	8	3	0	5	13	24	−11	9
7	IKMAL	8	3	0	5	11	22	−11	9
8	KISAS	8	1	0	7	20	32	−12	3
9	Ideal Heights	8	0	0	8	6	40	−34	0

Updated to match(es) played on 16 November 2019. Source: Alumni M4 League
Rules for classification: 1) Points; 2) Goal difference; 3) Number of goals scored.
(C) Champions

== Puchong Community League ==
Pos	Team	Pld	W	D	L	GF	GA	GD	Pts	Qualification or relegation
1	Thai Selangor (Q)	12	11	1	0	46	5	+41	34	Qualification to Play-off round and Selangor Champion League
2	Kartallar Sepang	13	10	2	1	32	11	+21	32	
3	Putra United	13	10	1	2	30	11	+19	31	
4	Puchong Legacy	13	8	1	4	27	13	+14	25	
5	Nabalu United	13	7	0	6	18	26	−8	21	
6	Nadi TYD	13	6	2	5	27	19	+8	20	
7	Puchong Fuerza U23	11	5	4	2	23	10	+13	19	
8	Puchong Utama	13	5	3	5	24	18	+6	18	
9	Puchong	13	5	3	5	25	20	+5	18	
10	Maju	12	3	3	6	14	15	−1	12	
11	PEBT Z15	13	2	3	8	17	27	−10	9	
12	SUNMED	13	2	1	10	12	42	−30	7	
13	4N	13	1	2	10	12	51	−39	5	
14	PURA	13	0	2	11	9	48	−39	2	

Source: Puchong Community League
Rules for classification: 1) Points; 2) Goal difference; 3) Number of goals scored.
(Q) Qualified for the phase indicated

== Shah Amateur League ==
Pos	Team	Pld	W	D	L	GF	GA	GD	Pts	Qualification or relegation
1	Klasiko (Q)	12	10	2	0	43	8	+35	32	Qualification to Play-off round and Selangor Champion League
2	Mofah II	12	10	2	0	38	12	+26	32	
3	MIB	11	9	0	2	36	4	+32	27	
4	RAJD	9	7	1	1	41	9	+32	22	
5	Kuatagh	12	7	1	4	40	14	+26	22	
6	Teratak	11	6	2	3	28	17	+11	20	
7	Cheras Raptors U21	12	5	1	6	19	21	−2	16	
8	Ombak	11	5	0	6	17	39	−22	15	
9	Fly United	12	4	1	7	24	52	−28	13	
10	Rawang City	12	4	0	8	14	26	−12	12	
11	Tarakki	12	2	0	10	9	43	−34	6	
12	SSLP	12	1	0	11	3	31	−28	3	
13	Real Eleven	12	0	0	12	0	36	−36	0	

Source: Shah Amateur League
Rules for classification: 1) Points; 2) Goal difference; 3) Number of goals scored.
(Q) Qualified for the phase indicated

== Selangor Social Premier League ==
Pos	Team	Pld	W	D	L	GF	GA	GD	Pts	Qualification or relegation
1	R.R.M	9	7	1	1	26	11	+15	22	Qualification to knockout stage
2	MOFAH (C)	9	7	0	2	34	9	+25	21	Qualification to knockout stage
3	IKRAM Muda F.C.	9	6	2	1	26	6	+20	20	Qualification to knockout stage and Qualification to Play-off round
4	Invictus	9	6	1	2	20	11	+9	19	Qualification to knockout stage
5	Sri Ampang BB	9	5	1	3	24	18	+6	16	Qualification to knockout stage
6	FC MHT	9	3	1	5	15	20	−5	10	Qualification to knockout stage
7	SSFC	9	2	1	6	15	24	−9	7	Qualification to knockout stage
8	Decathlon United	9	2	1	6	10	20	−10	7	Qualification to knockout stage
9	Adasana	9	2	0	7	11	36	−25	6	
10	Blastier Galacia	9	1	0	8	6	32	−26	3	

Source: Selangor Social Premier League
Rules for classification: 1) Points; 2) Goal difference; 3) Number of goals scored.
(C) Champions

=== Knockout stage ===
==== Quarter-finals ====
Team 1	Agg.	Team 2	1st leg	2nd leg
IKRAM Muda	5 − 3	FC MHT	3 – 3	2 – 0
RRM	6 − 3	Decathlon United	4 − 2	2 − 1
MOFAH	5 − 0	SSFC	2 − 0	3 - 0
Invictus	8 − 3	Adasana	4 − 3	4 − 0

==== Semi-finals ====
Team 1	Agg.	Team 2	1st leg	2nd leg
IKRAM Muda	5 − 2	RRM	1 – 0	4 – 2
MOFAH	6 − 1	Invictus	1 − 1	5 − 0

==== Final ====
Team 1	Score	Team 2
26 November 2019
IKRAM Muda	1 − 3	MOFAH

== Sultan Johor Cup ==
Group A

Pos	Team	Pld	W	D	L	GF	GA	GD	Pts	Promotion, qualification or relegation
1	Tangkak	3	2	0	1	3	2	+1	6	Knouck-out stage
2	Segamat	3	2	0	1	5	5	0	6	Knouck-out stage
3	Batu Pahat	3	1	1	1	5	4	+1	4	Knouck-out stage
4	MP Muar	3	0	1	2	1	3	−2	1	

Source: Johor Bahru FA
Rules for classification: 1) Points; 2) Goal difference; 3) Number of goals scored.

Group B

Pos	Team	Pld	W	D	L	GF	GA	GD	Pts	Promotion, qualification or relegation
1	Johor Bahru II	2	1	1	0	3	2	+1	4	Knouck-out stage
2	Kluang	2	1	0	1	3	2	+1	3	Knouck-out stage and Qualification to Play-off round
3	Pontian	2	0	1	1	3	5	−2	1	

Source: Johor Bahru FA
Rules for classification: 1) Points; 2) Goal difference; 3) Number of goals scored.

Group C

Pos	Team	Pld	W	D	L	GF	GA	GD	Pts	Promotion, qualification or relegation
1	Pasir Gudang United	3	3	0	0	8	2	+6	9	Knouck-out stage
2	Kota Tinggi	3	2	0	1	6	3	+3	6	Knouck-out stage
3	Pengerang	3	1	0	2	5	5	0	3	Knouck-out stage
4	Mersing	3	0	0	3	0	9	−9	0	

Source: Johor Bahru FA
Rules for classification: 1) Points; 2) Goal difference; 3) Number of goals scored.

=== Quarter-finals ===
Team 1	Score	Team 2
15 November 2019
Tangkak	0 − 2	Kluang
Pasir Gudang United	5 − 0	Batu Pahat
Segamat	1 − 2	Kota Tinggi
Johor Bahru II	1 − 1 (aet); 4 − 1 (p)	Pengerang

=== Semi-finals ===
Team 1	Score	Team 2
20 November 2019
Kluang	1 − 0 (aet)	Pasir Gudang United
Kota Tinggi	SF2	Johor Bahru II

=== Final ===
Team 1	Score	Team 2
27 November 2019
Kluang	2 - 0	Kota Tinggi

== Perlis Amateur League ==
Perlis Amateur League
- Season: 2019
- Champions: Tambun Tulang
- Promoted: Tambun Tulang; Northern Lions

Group A

Pos	Team	Pld	W	D	L	GF	GA	GD	Pts	Promotion, qualification or relegation
1	KSR-B	4	4	0	0	17	2	+15	12	Knouck-out stage
2	Edura Utara	4	2	1	1	14	6	+8	7	Knouck-out stage
3	VAPE	4	2	1	1	9	6	+3	7	Knouck-out stage
4	Wang Ulu Emqua	4	0	1	3	4	13	−9	1	
5	KSMR-TS	4	0	1	3	2	19	−17	1	

Source: Perlis FA Official
Rules for classification: 1) Points; 2) Goal difference; 3) Number of goals scored.

Group B

Pos	Team	Pld	W	D	L	GF	GA	GD	Pts	Promotion, qualification or relegation
1	KSR-A	4	3	1	0	7	1	+6	10	Knouck-out stage and Qualification to Play-off round
2	NFDP Perlis	4	3	0	1	4	3	+1	9	Knouck-out stage
3	Sanglang	4	2	1	1	13	5	+8	7	Knouck-out stage
4	UiTM Perlis	3	0	0	3	1	8	−7	0	
5	Kilat	3	0	0	3	1	9	−8	0	

Updated to match(es) played on 22 Oktober 2019. Source: Perlis FA Official
Rules for classification: 1) Points; 2) Goal difference; 3) Number of goals scored.

Group C

Pos	Team	Pld	W	D	L	GF	GA	GD	Pts	Promotion, qualification or relegation
1	Northern Lions	4	4	0	0	16	2	+14	12	Knouck-out stage
2	Tambun Tulang (C)	4	2	1	1	7	3	+4	7	Knouck-out stage
3	KSMR-A	4	2	0	2	6	3	+3	6	
4	Felda Chuping	4	0	2	2	2	13	−11	2	
5	AGENT	4	0	1	3	3	13	−10	1	

Source: Perlis FA Official
Rules for classification: 1) Points; 2) Goal difference; 3) Number of goals scored.
(C) Champions

=== Quarter-finals ===
Team 1	Score	Team 2
27 October 2019
Northern Lions F.C.	1 − 0	Edura Utara
NFDP Perlis	0 − 3	VAPE
2 November 2019
KSR-B	2 − 1	Sanglang
3 November 2019
KSR-A	1 − 1 (aet); 2 − 4 (p)	Tambun Tulang

=== Semi-finals ===
Team 1	Score	Team 2
11 November 2019
Northern Lions F.C.	2 − 0	VAPE
KSR-B	2 − 2 (aet) (1 − 4 p)	Tambun Tulang

=== Final ===
Team 1	Score	Team 2
22 November 2019
Northern Lions F.C.	0 - 1	Tambun Tulang

== PBNS Cup ==
=== First round ===
==== Group A ====
Pos	Team	Pld	W	D	L	GF	GA	GD	Pts	Promotion, qualification or relegation
1	MPPD	3	3	0	0	7	3	+4	9	Second round
2	Wan Mei	3	2	0	1	12	4	+8	6	Second round
3	Penjara NS	3	1	0	2	6	6	0	3	
4	NSIA	3	0	0	3	3	15	−12	0	

Source: Nusa Intan Official
Rules for classification: 1) Points; 2) Goal difference; 3) Number of goals scored.

==== Group B ====
Pos	Team	Pld	W	D	L	GF	GA	GD	Pts	Promotion, qualification or relegation
1	PBD Jempol	3	2	1	0	9	5	+4	7	Second round
2	MSD Seremban	3	2	1	0	4	2	+2	7	Second round
3	Yayasan NS	3	0	1	2	3	6	−3	1	
4	PBD Jelebu	3	0	1	2	2	5	−3	1	

Source: Nusa Intan Official
Rules for classification: 1) Points; 2) Goal difference; 3) Number of goals scored.

==== Group C ====
Pos	Team	Pld	W	D	L	GF	GA	GD	Pts	Promotion, qualification or relegation
1	MP Seremban	3	3	0	0	11	4	+7	9	Second round
2	MD Tampin	3	2	0	1	11	2	+9	6	Second round
3	USIM	3	1	0	2	6	3	+3	3	
4	Thivy Jaya	3	0	0	3	3	22	−19	0	

Updated to match(es) played on completw. Source: Nusa Intan Official
Rules for classification: 1) Points; 2) Goal difference; 3) Number of goals scored.

==== Group D ====
Pos	Team	Pld	W	D	L	GF	GA	GD	Pts	Promotion, qualification or relegation
1	KSR SAINS	3	2	1	0	11	2	+9	7	Second round
2	Desa Rhu	3	1	0	2	4	5	−1	3	Second round
3	PBD Tampin	3	1	0	2	2	4	−2	3	
4	Jempol Dreams	3	1	0	2	3	9	−6	3	

Source: Nusa Intan Official
Rules for classification: 1) Points; 2) Goal difference; 3) Number of goals scored.

==== Group E ====
Pos	Team	Pld	W	D	L	GF	GA	GD	Pts	Promotion, qualification or relegation
1	KBT Nusa Intan	3	1	2	0	6	3	+3	5	Second round
2	Mixstar	3	1	1	1	4	6	−2	4	Second round
3	Politeknik NS	3	0	3	0	1	1	0	3	
4	PB Kelana Putra	3	0	2	1	5	6	−1	2	

Source: Nusa Intan Official
Rules for classification: 1) Points; 2) Goal difference; 3) Number of goals scored.

==== Group F ====
Pos	Team	Pld	W	D	L	GF	GA	GD	Pts	Promotion, qualification or relegation
1	PB Kuala Pilah	3	3	0	0	8	0	+8	9	Second round
2	Alamanda	3	1	1	1	4	4	0	4	Second round
3	UiTM Seremban 3	3	0	2	1	0	4	−4	2	
4	BRS	3	0	1	2	2	6	−4	1	

Source: Nusa Intan Official
Rules for classification: 1) Points; 2) Goal difference; 3) Number of goals scored.

=== Second round ===
==== Group A ====
Pos	Team	Pld	W	D	L	GF	GA	GD	Pts	Promotion, qualification or relegation
1	MP Seremban	2	2	0	0	6	0	+6	6	Knouck-out stage
2	MSD Seremban	2	1	0	1	3	3	0	3	Knouck-out stage
3	MPPD	2	0	0	2	0	6	−6	0	

Source: Nusa Intan Official
Rules for classification: 1) Points; 2) Goal difference; 3) Number of goals scored.

==== Group B ====
Pos	Team	Pld	W	D	L	GF	GA	GD	Pts	Promotion, qualification or relegation
1	Wan Mei	2	1	1	0	8	4	+4	4	Knouck-out stage
2	MD Tampin	2	1	1	0	5	2	+3	4	Knouck-out stage
3	PBD Jempol	2	0	0	2	4	11	−7	0	

Source: Nusa Intan Official
Rules for classification: 1) Points; 2) Goal difference; 3) Number of goals scored.

==== Group C ====
Pos	Team	Pld	W	D	L	GF	GA	GD	Pts	Promotion, qualification or relegation
1	KSR SAINS (C, Q)	2	2	0	0	8	2	+6	6	Knouck-out stage and Qualification to Play-off round
2	PBD Kuala Pilah	2	1	0	1	5	5	0	3	Knouck-out stage
3	Mixstar	2	0	0	2	1	7	−6	0	

Updated to match(es) played on comolete. Source: Nusa Intan Official
Rules for classification: 1) Points; 2) Goal difference; 3) Number of goals scored.
(C) Champions; (Q) Qualified for the phase indicated

==== Group D ====
Pos	Team	Pld	W	D	L	GF	GA	GD	Pts	Promotion, qualification or relegation
1	Desa Rhu	2	2	0	0	3	0	+3	6	Knouck-out stage
2	Alamanda	2	1	0	1	3	3	0	3	Knouck-out stage
3	KBT Nusa Intan	2	0	0	2	1	4	−3	0	

Source: Nusa Intan Official
Rules for classification: 1) Points; 2) Goal difference; 3) Number of goals scored.

=== Knouck-out stage ===
==== Quarter-finals ====
Team 1	Score	Team 2
14 November 2019
KSR SAINS	5 − 2	MD Tampin
15 November 2019
MP Seremban	3 − 0	Alamanda
17 November 2019
Wan Mei	2 − 0	PBD Kuala Pilah
18 November 2019
Desa Rhu	1 − 1 (aet); 3 − 2 (p)	MSD Seremban

==== Semi-finals ====
Team 1	Score	Team 2
21 November 2019
MP Seremban	1 − 2	KSR SAINS
Wan Mei	3 − 0	Desa Rhu

==== Final ====
Team 1	Score	Team 2
27 November 2019
KSR SAINS	2 − 1	Wan Mei

== Klang Valley M4 League ==
The FA Cup champions will be eligible for play-off qualification.

=== Quarter-finals ===
Team 1	Score	Team 2
5 October 2019
Shah Alam United	0 − 3	Red Spade United
Perlima United	0 − 0 (aet); 5 − 3 (p)	Subang United
6 October 2019
Shah Alam Antlers	1 − 0	Kompleks
AZE	5 − 0	AX

=== Semi-finals ===
Team 1	Agg.	Team 2	1st leg	2nd leg
Shah Alam Antlers	0 − 2	AZE	0 − 0	0 − 2
Red Spade United	3 − 5	Perlima United	3 − 3	0 − 2

=== Final ===
Team 1	Score	Team 2
26 October 2019
AZE	0 − 0; 4 − 2 (p)	Perlima United

== Play-off round ==
=== Bracket ===
First round
A1	Kuatagh	1
A2	KSR SAINS	4
A3	Klasiko	4
A4	Cheras Perdana	0
A5	AZE	3
A6	PJ Hiliran	2
A7	CCT FC	3 (6)
A8	KSR Kuala Perlis	3 (7)
A9	Thai Selangor	2
A10	MBMB Warriors	1
A11	JARR	0
A12	FC Palitus	3
A13	Kluang FA	0
A14	PIB	1
A15	Real Chukai	2
A16	Ikram Muda	5

Quarter-final
KSR SAINS	1
Klasiko	0
AZE	2 (4)
KSR Kuala Perlis	2 (3)
Thai Selangor	3
FC Palitus	2
PIB	1
Ikram Muda	2

Semi-final
KSR SAINS	6
AZE	1
Thai Selangor	2
Ikram Muda	3

Final
KSR SAINS	1
Ikram Muda	0

=== First round ===
The first round was played on 7 and 8 December 2019 at Rhino Kv Arena.

7 December 2019	Kuatagh	1 − 4	KSR SAINS	Shah Alam
16:15 UTC+8	Redo Renaldi 75'		Mohd Suhaili 45+2', 49', 90' (pen.); Gevanesh Santhira 63' (pen.)	Stadium: Padang A, Rhino KV Arena

7 December 2019	Real Chukai	2 − 5	IKRAM Muda	Shah Alam
16:15 UTC+8	Tuan Afif Nasurullah 1'; Engku Fakrul Nizam 5'		Ridhwan Johan 25', 57'; Azrul Razman 29'; Muhammad Fakrulrazi 45+5', 69'	Stadium: Padang B, Rhino KV Arena

7 December 2019	CCT	3 − 3 (a.e.t.) (6 – 7 p)	KSR Kuala Perlis	Shah Alam
20:15 UTC+8	Nurullah Hakim 15' (pen.); Farhan Hamid 21', 90'		Rizal Fahmi 15' (o.g.); Shukor Azmi 40'; Hafizi Podzi 54'	Stadium: Padang A, Rhino KV Arena

7 December 2019	Kluang FA	0 − 1	PIB	Shah Alam
20:15 UTC+8			Afiq Arshad 38'	Stadium: Padang B, Rhino KV Arena

8 December 2019	Thai Selangor	2 − 1	MBMB Warriors	Shah Alam
16:15 UTC+8	Muazzim Bad Khalil 34'; Thinaadkharan Muthiah 82'		Saiful Mostapa 38'	Stadium: Padang A, Rhino KV Arena

8 December 2019	JARR	0 − 3	FC Palitus	Shah Alam
16:15 UTC+8			Jefri Tahiruddin 28' (pen.); Arman Zikri 45+3'; Syazwan Nasaruddin 61'	Stadium: Padang B, Rhino KV Arena

8 December 2019	Klasiko	4 − 0	Cheras Perdana	Shah Alam
20:15 UTC+8	Amir Safuan 26'; Jamil Garba 35', 82'; Ammar Anuwar 49'			Stadium: Padang A, Rhino KV Arena

8 December 2019	AZE	3 − 2	PJ Hiliran	Shah Alam
20:15 UTC+8	Rahimin Rahim 41', 86'; Hazwani Karim 71' (pen.)		Safwan Samsol 32'; Faizal Abu Bakar 90+3'	Stadium: Padang B Rhino KV Arena

=== Quarter-finals ===
14 December 2019	KSR SAINS	1 − 0	Klasiko	Shah Alam
16:15 UTC+8	Khaizli Jasmi 90+4' (pen.)			Stadium: Padang B Rhino KV Arena

14 December 2019	AZE	2 − 2 (a.e.t.) (4 – 3 p)	KSR Kuala Perlis	Shah Alam
20:15 UTC+8	Rahimi Rahim 34' (pen.); Azwan Othman 120+4'		Mohamad Fadzwin 55'; Farhan Mustafa 99'	Stadium: Padang B Rhino KV Arena

15 December 2019	Thai Selangor	3 − 2	FC Palitus	Shah Alam
16:15 UTC+8	Thinaadkharan Muthiah 13'; Hazromie Zulkifli 41'; Iqbal Zukurian 44'		Nizam Yurhanis 26'; Harith Roslan 87'	Stadium: Padang B Rhino KV Arena

15 December 2019	PIB	1 − 2	IKRAM Muda	Shah Alam
20:15 UTC+8	Ibrahim Suhaib 71'		Muhammad Ammar 41'; Muhamad Firdaus 45+3'	Stadium: Padang B Rhino KV Arena

=== Semi-finals ===
21 December 2019	KSR SAINS	6 – 1	AZE	Kuala Lumpur
16:15 UTC+8	Khaizli Jasmi 4', 45'; Firdaus Azizul 28', 61'; Mohd Suhaili 37'; Sensoo Moses 80'		Ismail Mamat 43'	Stadium: Mindef Stadium

22 December 2019	Thai Selangor	2 – 3 (a.e.t.)	IKRAM Muda	Shah Alam
20:15 UTC+8	Akmal Firdaus 19'; Vishnu Raj 83'		Ridhwan Johan 45+3', 75', 104'	Stadium: UiTM Stadium

=== Final ===
28 December 2019
20:15 UTC+8

KSR SAINS	1–0	IKRAM Muda
Norfaizzal Faroq 89'

UiTM Stadium

== See also ==
- 2019 Malaysia Super League
- 2019 Malaysia Premier League
- 2019 Malaysia M3 League
- 2019 Malaysia FA Cup
