= Langkawi Stadium =

Stadium in Langkawi, Kedah, Malaysia

Coordinates: 6°19′45.7″N 99°51′29.1″E

- Interactive map of Langkawi Stadium
- Location: Langkawi, Kedah, Malaysia
- Owner: Langkawi Development Authority
- Operator: Langkawi Development Authority
- Capacity: 10,000
- Surface: Grass pitch Track

Construction
- Opened: 1991; 35 years ago
- Renovated: 2016; 10 years ago
- General contractors: NYC Contracts and Engineering

Tenant
- Langkawi City F.C.

Langkawi Stadium is a stadium in Langkawi, Kedah, Malaysia. It was built by the Langkawi Development Authority LADA for recreational facilities in the area of Langkawi. The stadium is located in the Langkawi Sport Centre. It has 2 parts of roof and the capacity of 10,000.
