= Taiki Kagayama =

Japanese footballer

Personal information
- Full name: Taiki Kagayama
- Date of birth: 14 May 1996 (age 30)
- Place of birth: Osaka, Japan
- Height: 1.68 m (5 ft 6 in)
- Position: Winger

Team information
- Current team: GIF Sundsvall
- Number: 9

Youth career
- –2015: JFA Academy Fukushima
- 2015–2019: Kansai University

Senior career*
Years	Team	Apps	(Gls)
2019	MuSa	15	(7)
2019	KPV	8	(0)
2020–2021	Inter Turku	44	(8)
2022	Sabah	22	(2)
2023	Samgurali Tsqaltubo	26	(5)
2024–	GIF Sundsvall	65	(10)
- * Club domestic league appearances and goals as of 12 November 2026

Taiki Kagayama (加賀山 泰毅, Kagayama Taiki; born 14 May 1996) is a Japanese footballer who plays as a winger for Swedish Superettan side GIF Sundsvall.

== Club career ==
=== MuSa ===
Kagayama made his league debut against AC Kajaani on 27 April 2019. He scored his first league goal against AC Oulu on 29 May 2019, scoring in the 37th minute.

On 11 July 2019, Kagayama won June Player of the Month.

=== KPV ===
On 8 August 2019, Kagayama was announced at KPV. He made his league debut against HIFK Fotboll on 9 August 2019.

=== Inter Turku ===
Kagayama was announced at Inter Turku. He made his league debut against RoPS on 2 July 2020. Kagayama scored his first league goal against Ilves on 11 July 2020, scoring in the 41st minute.

=== Sabah ===
On 29 January 2022, Kagayama signed with Sabah in Malaysia. He played 30 matches in all competition for Sabah and provide 2 assist and 3 goals in the Malaysia Super League. He scored 2 goals in the Malaysia Cup to take Sabah to the semi-final. He left at the end of the season to return to Finland.

=== Samgurali Tsqaltubo ===
Kagayama made his league debut against Torpedo Kutaisi on 19 March 2023. He scored his first league goal against FC Samtredia on 22 April 2023, scoring in the 88th minute.

=== GIF Sundsvall ===
On August 14 2024, Kagayama was announced at GIF Sundsvall. He made his league debut against Varbergs BoIS on 16 August 2024.

On 19 April 2025, the Swedish club confirmed that they had exercised a clause in Kagayama’s contract allowing them to terminate the agreement. The decision was part of a cost-cutting initiative aimed at reducing expenses. According to media reports, it was also influenced by interest from the North Macedonian club FK Voska Sport. However, just a few days later, on 9 January 2025, it was announced that Kagayama and GIF Sundsvall had signed a new contract, with Kagayama agreeing to a reduced salary.

== Career statistics ==
=== Club ===
As of 22 July 2026

Club	Season	League			Cup		Continental		Other		Total	
Club	Season	Division	Apps	Goals	Apps	Goals	Apps	Goals	Apps	Goals	Apps	Goals
MuSa	2019	Ykkönen	15	7	0	0	–		0	0	15	7
KPV	2019	Veikkausliiga	6	0	0	0	–		2 (Note: Appearances in the Relegation play-offs)	0	8	0
Inter Turku	2020	Veikkausliiga	22	4	5 (Note: Appearances in the Finnish Cup)	2	1 (Note: Appearances in the UEFA Europa League)	0	0	0	28	6
Inter Turku	2021	Veikkausliiga	22	4	5	1	2 (Note: Appearances in the UEFA Conference League)	0	0	0	29	5
Inter Turku	Total		44	8	10	3	3	0	0	0	57	11
Sabah	2022	Malaysia Super League	22	2	2 (Note: Appearances in the Malaysia FA Cup)	1	–		6 (Note: Appearances in the Malaysia Cup)	2	30	5
Samgurali Tsqaltubo	2023	Erovnuli Liga	26	5	3	1	–		–		29	6
GIF Sundsvall	2024	Superettan	14	2	1	0	–		–		15	2
GIF Sundsvall	2025	Superettan	27	7	3	0	–		–		30	7
GIF Sundsvall	2026	Superettan	9	0	0	0	–		–		9	0
GIF Sundsvall	Total		50	9	4	0	0	0	0	0	54	9
Career total			163	31	19	5	3	0	8	2	193	38
