= Hyuri =

Brazilian footballer (born 1991)

Personal information
- Full name: Hyuri Henrique de Oliveira Costa
- Date of birth: 26 September 1991 (age 35)
- Place of birth: Rio de Janeiro, Brazil
- Height: 1.86 m (6 ft 1 in)
- Position: Forward

Team information
- Current team: Quang Nam
- Number: 9

Youth career
- 2007–2011: Audax Rio

Senior career*
Years	Team	Apps	(Gls)
2011–2013	Audax Rio	50	(15)
2013	→ Botafogo (loan)	17	(3)
2014–2015	Guizhou Renhe	53	(16)
2016–2020	Atlético Mineiro	25	(2)
2017	→ Chongqing Lifan (loan)	2	(1)
2018	→ Ceará (loan)	4	(0)
2018	→ Ponte Preta (loan)	12	(1)
2019	→ Sport Recife (loan)	21	(3)
2020	Atlético Goianiense	24	(2)
2020–2021	CRB	43	(12)
2021	Hatta	17	(0)
2022	Selangor	8	(3)
2023	Vila Nova	16	(0)
2023	CRB	16	(2)
2024	Paysandu	4	(0)
2024	Confiança	5	(1)
2024–	Quang Nam	0	(0)
- * Club domestic league appearances and goals as of June 16, 2024

Hyuri Henrique de Oliveira Costa (born 29 September 1991), simply known as Hyuri, is a Brazilian professional footballer who plays as a forward for V.League 1 club Quang Nam.

== Club career ==
On 26 January 2014, Hyuri transferred from Botafogo to Chinese Super League side Guizhou Renhe.

On 5 January 2016, Hyuri transferred from Chinese Super League side Guizhou Renhe to Brazilian side Atlético Mineiro through an undisclosed deal. He was one of the reinforcements who came into the club at the beginning of the 2016 season to help Galo regain the Copa Libertadores in 2016. Hyuri made his debut for Atlético in a 3-0 win against Schalke 04 in a friendly played on January 13, 2016.

=== CRB ===
On 4 April 2023, it was announced that Hyuri would be returning to Clube de Regatas Brasil (CRB), where he had previously enjoyed considerable success between 2020 and 2021, scoring 12 goals in 43 matches.

=== Selangor ===
On 29 January 2022, Hyuri's reach agreement to join Malaysia Super League club Selangor for 2022 season.

=== Quang Nam ===
On 27 September 2024, Hyuri signed for Vietnamese V.League 1 club Quang Nam.
