= Jenius Karib =

Malaysian footballer

Personal information
- Full name: Jenius Achai Karib
- Date of birth: 27 March 1993 (age 33)
- Place of birth: Sabah, Malaysia
- Height: 1.73 m (5 ft 8 in)
- Position: Defender

Team information
- Current team: Kinabalu Jaguar
- Number: 14

Senior career*
Years	Team	Apps	(Gls)
2019–2020	Sabah	4	(0)
2020–	Kinabalu Jaguar	38	(3)
- * Club domestic league appearances and goals as of 1 February 2022

Jenius Achai Karib (born 27 March 1993) is a Malaysian professional footballer who plays as a defender for Malaysia M3 League club, the Kinabalu Jaguar FC.
