= Kinabalu Jaguar F.C. =

Malaysian football club

Kinabalu Jaguar
- Full name: Kinabalu Jaguar Football Club
- Nicknames: Jaguarians; The Panthera Onca; Sang Jaguar Kinabalu
- Founded: 2021; 5 years ago
- Dissolved: 2023
- Ground: Penampang Stadium
- Capacity: 1,000
- Chairman: Verdon Bahanda
- League: Malaysia M3 League
Home colours	Away colours

Kinabalu Jaguar Football Club or KJFC was a Malaysian football club based in Likas Square Commercial Centre, Kota Kinabalu, Sabah, established by Verdon Bahanda in 2021. It last played in the Malaysia M3 League.

== History ==
The Kinabalu Jaguar Football Club was formed by businessman and former footballer of Sabah, Verdon Bahanda.

In 2021, the club's management has designated Likas Square Commercial Centre, Kota Kinabalu, Sabah as the club's central headquarters. The KJFC logo was designed by Mohd Fazlin Bin Ariffin.

== Players ==
=== First-team squad ===
As of 8 February 2022

Note: Flags indicate national team as defined under FIFA eligibility rules; some limited exceptions apply. Players may hold more than one non-FIFA nationality.

No.	Pos.	Nation	Player
1	GK	MAS	Tekson Tubeng
3	DF	MAS	Muhd Rozaily Akhmad
5	DF	MAS	Abd Rahim Razali
6	DF	MAS	Ranilson Batuil
7	MF	MAS	Justin Samaan
8	MF	MAS	Melky Balang
9	FW	MAS	Mohd Faredz Elham Abd Rasid
10	MF	MAS	Mohd Jayman Mohd Jaymi
11	FW	MAS	Muhamad Faqhrurazi Ahmad
12	DF	MAS	Shafie Talip
14	DF	MAS	Jenius Karib (captain)
16	MF	MAS	Leonardo Lisua
17	FW	MAS	Leopold Alphonso Otong

No.	Pos.	Nation	Player
18	MF	MAS	Sabri Sahar
19	MF	MAS	Faizulnizam Aziz
21	FW	MAS	Zulkifly Harun
22	GK	MAS	Fahmi Ikhwan Muhamad Azmi
23	MF	MAS	Ariusdius Jais
26	FW	MAS	Klismon Aribulan
27	DF	MAS	Mohd Azmizan Ruslih
29	DF	MAS	Muhamad Zaki Sapri
30	DF	MAS	Mohd Izzat Aziz
33	GK	MAS	Mohd Sakri Masri
81	DF	MAS	Mohd Azwan Abd Fattah
88	MF	MAS	Mohd Aidil Safee

=== Club captains ===
Years	Name
2021	(Malaysia) Melky Balang
2022	(Malaysia) Jenius Karib

=== Coaches ===
Years	Head coach	Assistant
2021	(Malaysia) Razali Mohammad Zinin	(Malaysia) Jelius Ating
2022	(Malaysia) Mohd Asyraaf Fong Abdullah	

== Management team ==
- Team manager: Adzhar b. Mohamad
- Goalkeeper coach: Dante S Tipay
- Fitness coach: Muhamadin b. Abdul Ajid
- Team doctor: Firdaus b. Ahmayuddin
- Physiotherapist: Kelvin Chong Han Vui
- Head of ecurity: Roning b. Mulut
- Kitman: Jamal b. Damin
- Team secretary: David Toru
- Assistant secretary: Clerence George
- Media officer: Hanif b. Ismail
