= SAINS F.C. =

Malaysian football club

SAINS
- Full name: Syarikat Air Negeri Sembilan Football Club
- Founded: 2019; 6 years ago
- Dissolved: 2024
- Ground: Tuanku Abdul Rahman Stadium
- Capacity: 45,000
- Owner: Syarikat Air Negeri Sembilan
- Chairman: Mislan Miskan
- Head coach: Hamizar Hamzah
- League: Malaysia M3 League
- 2023: Malaysia M3 League, 5th of 13

Syarikat Air Negeri Sembilan Football Club, simply known as SAINS FC, was a Malaysian professional football club based in Seremban, Negeri Sembilan. They last played in the third division of the Malaysian football league system, the Malaysia M3 League.

== History ==
SAINS FC started fielding a football team for Malaysia's domestic competitions the M-League. In 2019, the club has won the play-off, winning promotion to the 2020 M3 League.

== Players ==
As of 11 March 2023

Note: Flags indicate national team as defined under FIFA eligibility rules; some limited exceptions apply. Players may hold more than one non-FIFA nationality.

No.	Pos.	Nation	Player
3	DF	(Malaysia) MAS	Tengku Qayyum
4	DF	(Malaysia) MAS	Azli Azrul
5	DF	(Malaysia) MAS	Arif Ismail
6	MF	(Malaysia) MAS	Asyraf Roslan
7	MF	(Malaysia) MAS	Ridhwan Dulfakar
8	DF	(Malaysia) MAS	Zulhelmi Roslan
9	FW	(Malaysia) MAS	Nurzaidi Bunari
10	DF	(Malaysia) MAS	Nazrul Kamaruzaman
11	MF	(Malaysia) MAS	Khaizil Jasmi
12	GK	(Malaysia) MAS	Kaharuddin Rahman
13	FW	(Malaysia) MAS	Norfaizzal Faroq Zaharuddin
14	DF	(Malaysia) MAS	Danial Hadri
15	DF	(Malaysia) MAS	Daniel Haikal
16	MF	(Malaysia) MAS	Fikri Rahim
17	MF	(Malaysia) MAS	Amirul Afiq
18	MF	(Malaysia) MAS	Rafiq Shah
19	MF	(Malaysia) MAS	Naqiuddin Amran

No.	Pos.	Nation	Player
20	MF	(Malaysia) MAS	Tengku Norzaiful
21	DF	(Malaysia) MAS	Huzaimi Mokhtar
22	GK	(Malaysia) MAS	Izzat Hakimi
23	FW	(Malaysia) MAS	Firdaus Azizul
24	FW	(Malaysia) MAS	Fauzi Latif
26	DF	(Malaysia) MAS	Iman Hakimi
27	DF	(Malaysia) MAS	Zulkhairi Zulkeply
28	DF	(Malaysia) MAS	Dzaiddin Zainuddin
29	DF	(Malaysia) MAS	Alif Samsudin
30	GK	(Malaysia) MAS	Jibrail Kamaron
34	DF	(Malaysia) MAS	Amier Amsyar
80	MF	(Malaysia) MAS	Murtadza Noradzan
88	DF	(Malaysia) MAS	Zamri Johar

== Management team ==
- Team manager: Mohamad Afif Anuar
- Assistant manager: Azizul Hamzah
- Head coach: Hamizar Hamzah
- Assistant coach: Mohd Tarmizi Bin Mahamed Hanifah
- Goalkeeping coach: Fadil Mohd Faksi, Mohd Fausi
- Fitness coach: Mohd Kamil Ujang
- Physio: Muhammad Azri Raffi

== Honours ==
=== League ===
- Division 4/M4 League

(gold) Winners (1): 2019

- PBNS President

(gold) Winners (1): 2019

(silver) Runners-up (2): 2017, 2018
