= Che Ku Marzuki =

Malaysian footballer and manager

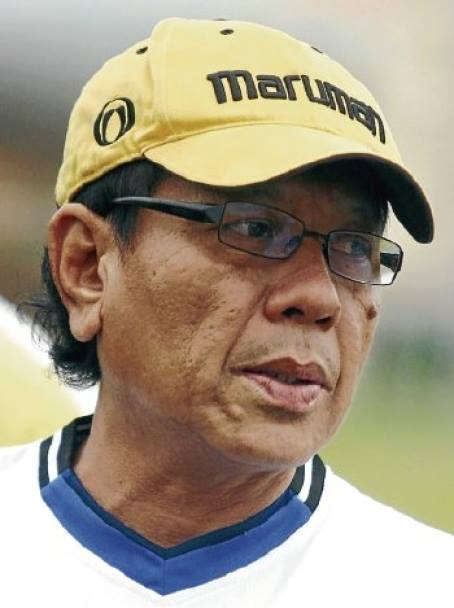

Personal information
- Full name: Che Ku Marzuki bin Che Ku Mohd Noor
- Date of birth: 19 January 1956 (age 70)
- Place of birth: Terengganu, Malaysia
- Position: Defender

Team information
- Current team: Kerteh (Technical Director)

Senior career*
Years	Team	Apps	(Gls)
1977–1981	Terengganu		

International career
1977	Malaysia U-19		

Managerial career
- 1982: Fajar Hiliran (assistant)
- 1983–1986: Fajar Hiliran
- 1987: Terengganu U-16
- 1998: Terengganu U-16
- 2001–2007: Terengganu U-17
- 2003: Malaysia U-17
- 2007: Terengganu (Technical Director)
- 2008: Terengganu U-21
- 2009–2010: T-Team
- 2012: T-Team (assistant)
- 2013: T-Team (caretaker)
- 2016–2017: Terengganu (caretaker)
- 2017–2018: Terenggany City (Technical Director)
- 2019: Batu Dua
- 2019–2020: Kerteh (caretaker)
- 2020–: Kerteh (Technical Director)
- * Club domestic league appearances and goals

Che Ku Marzuki (born in Terengganu) is a Malaysian professional football manager, who is currently the Technical Director of Malaysia M4 League football club Kerteh FC. He had previously been in charge of clubs competing in top tier Malaysia football league system. A former football player, he was in the Malaysia U-19 squad for the 1977 AFC Youth Championship held in Tehran, Iran.

== Career ==
=== Playing career ===
Che Ku Marzuki begin his football career with Terengganu. Playing as a defender, he played for the state from 1977 to 1981, representing the under age and senior squad throughout the years.

Che Ku Marzuki was part of a Malaysia U-19 team that qualified to 1977 AFC Youth Championship which was held in Tehran, Iran.

=== Managerial career ===
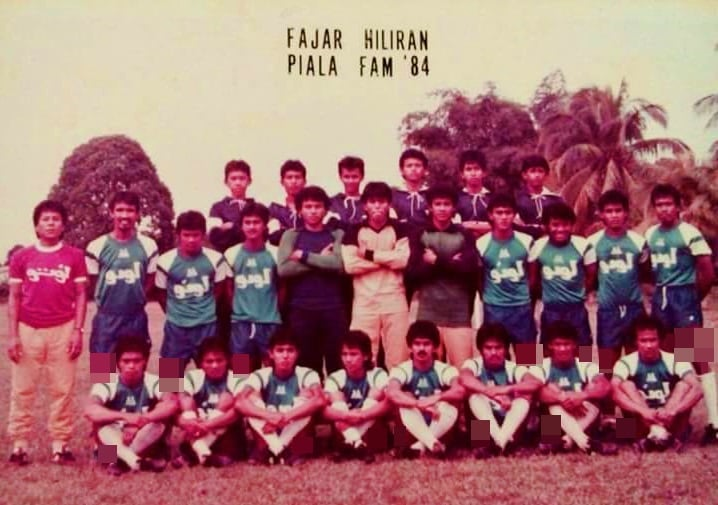
Che Ku Marzuki with 1984 Malaysia FAM League runner-up squad, Fajar Hiliran.

After an uneventful career as a defender in the Malaysia leagues, Che Ku Marzuki moved into coaching in 1982, first as an assistant coach for Fajar Hiliran, Terengganu based football club that competes in Malaysia FAM Cup. From 1983, he became head coach for the club and lead them in 1984 Malaysia FAM Cup campaign until the final before lost 1–2 to Johor Bahru FA. From 1987 to 2007, Che Ku Marzuki heavily involves with grassroots coaching and leading football academy in Terengganu and national level. His vast experience with young players land him a managerial role for Terengganu U-21 squad competing in 2008 Sukma Games which saw them bagged gold.

In 2009, Che Ku Marzuki joined a Malaysia Premier League side T-Team where he successfully promoted them to Malaysia Super League in the following year. He managed to qualified for quarter-final of Malaysia FA Cup 2009 and 2010 edition.

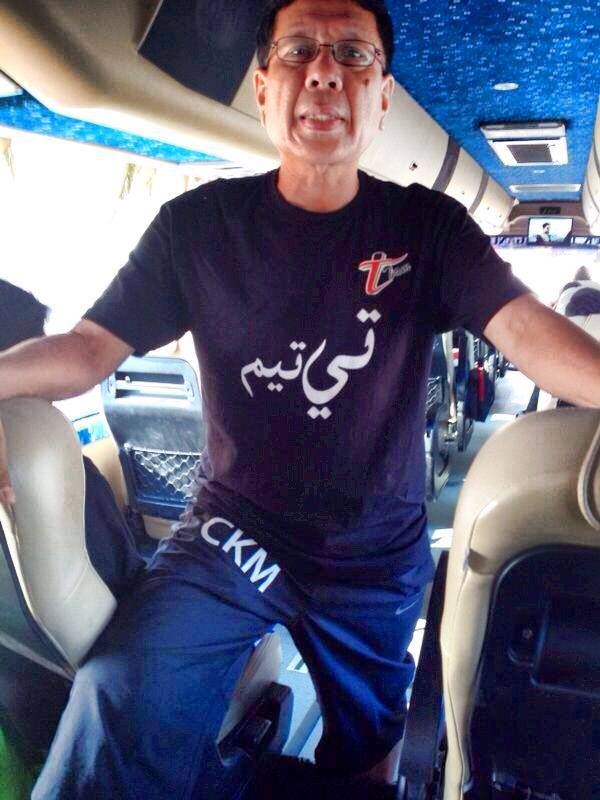
Che Ku Marzuki during his tenure at T-Team in 2009.

After leading Terengganu Football Academy for a year in 2011, he was appointed as assistant coach for T-Team in 2012 and promoted as interim manager in 2013 season. In 2016 season, after Mike Mulvey was rested as Terengganu manager, Che Ku Marzuki was appointed as interim manager alongside Mustaffa Kamal. He won Malaysia FAM League with Terengganu City in 2018. Batu Dua, a Malaysia M3 League later signed him as head coach for the club in early 2019. He was soon hired by Kerteh FC at the end of 2019 as their Technical Director. In early 2021, Che Ku Marzuki was offered a Technical Director role at Terengganu FC but it's unclear whether he accepted the offer or not.

=== Football development success ===
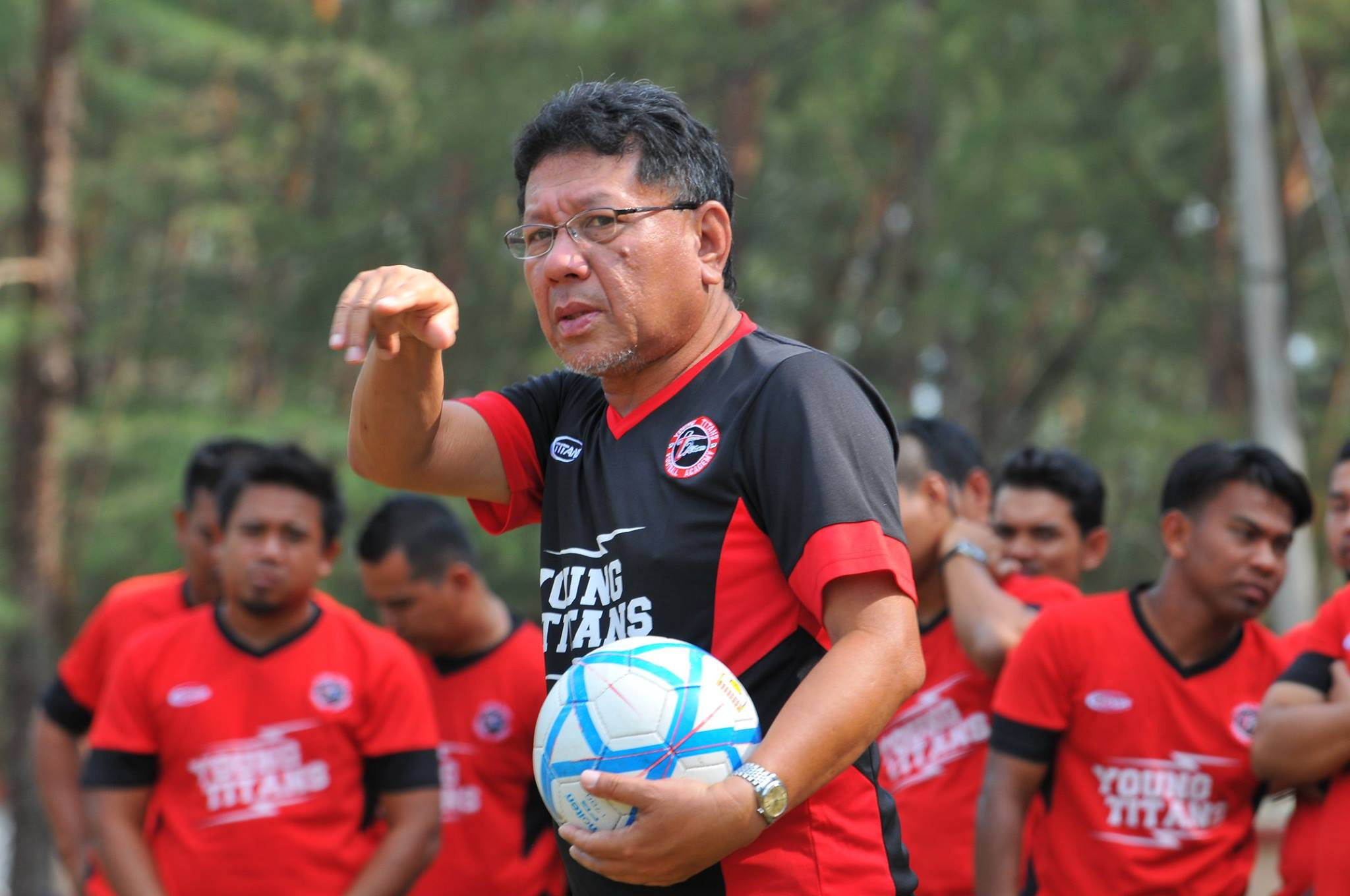
Che Ku Marzuki at Young Titans Football Academy in 2015.

Che Ku Marzuki dedicated most of his life in grassroots football academies, educating and nurturing young footballers and turning them into well developed professional football players. He had a brief stint with Terengganu youth squad in 1987 and lead them to the national Coca-Cola Cup 1987 final. He was appointed as director for FAM/Adidas Football Academy Terengganu from 1995 to 2017. With the academy, he achieved many success such as winning national U17 Academy League 10 times including 9 championship in a row from 1999 to 2007. The academy success earned them Best Academy Award in 1997, 1999 and 2002. The award is contributed by the German and Bayern Munich football legend, Franz Beckenbauer and presented to the academy director, Che Ku Marzuki.

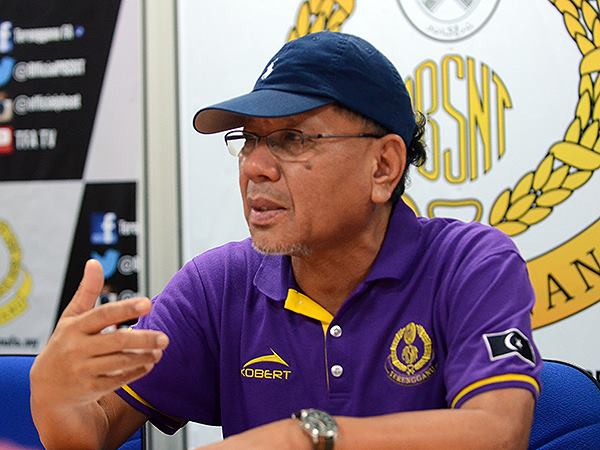
Che Ku Marzuki during one the press conference during his tenure at Malaysia Super League side Terengganu in 2016.

He also lead the academy team which represents Malaysia at the time in 2003 JFA Tournament in Saitama, Japan, and achieved second place.

After two years of club management in Malaysian League from 2009 to 2010, he was appointed again as head coach of Terengganu Football Academy on 15 December 2011. After two years at the academy, he was involved with T-Team in 2012 and 2013 Malaysia Super League campaign. His contract as head coach ends in early 2014 but later was offered as directorship role at Young Titans Football Academy, which is owned by T-Team. He still manage the academy to date despite being involve with few Malaysia M3 and M4 league football clubs.

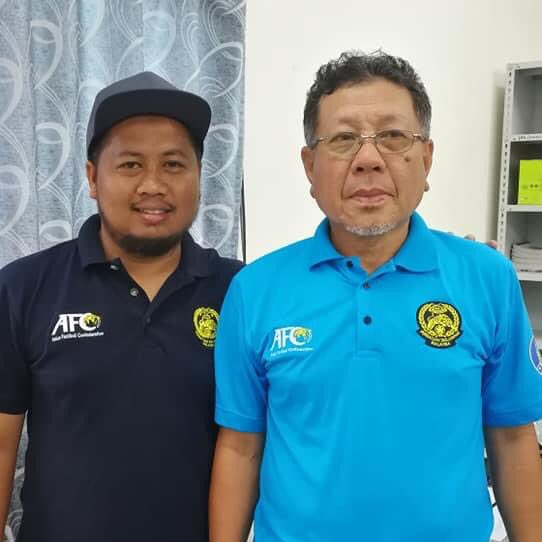
Che Ku Marzuki as FAM/AFC coaching instructor in 2021.

Due to his vast experience in football development in Malaysia, he is well respected by the people in the local football industry and often invited by Football Association of Malaysia as an instructor for national coaching courses. Among such players attributed to his success are Zairo Anuar, Haris Safwan, Syamsuri Mustafa, Manaf Mamat, Ashari Samsudin, Muslim Ahmad, and Sharbinee Allawee.

== Football moments ==
=== FAM ban ===
Che Ku Marzuki who was T-Team head coach in 2010, was sentenced to six months suspension and fined RM2,000 by Football Association of Malaysia due to his comments on 27 July while interviewed by New Straits Times journalist regarding the host stadium, for the Perlis and Terengganu match during the 2010 Super League.

=== Survive stadium collapse ===
On 2 June 2009, the roof of Sultan Mizan Zainal Abidin Stadium collapsed due to failed structure. It was widely reported on media that T-Team was going to play at the stadium during the day of the tragedy, but the team survived the incident due to Che Ku Marzuki who was the team head coach at the time insisted to reschedule their match to another day.

== Honours ==
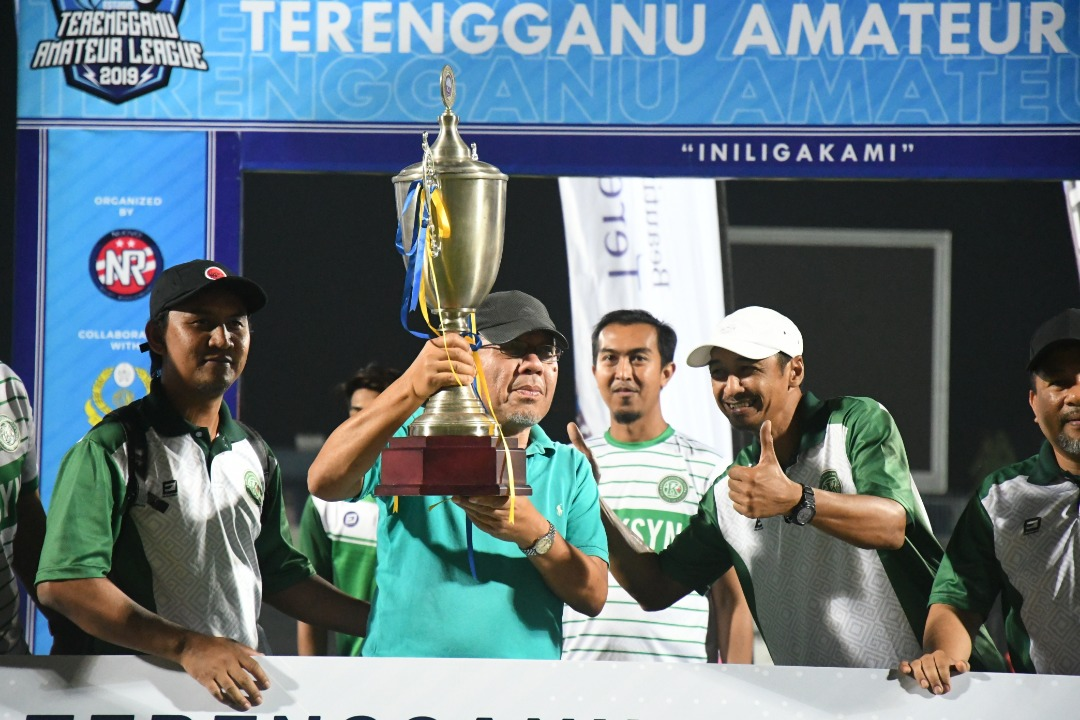
Che Ku Marzuki with the Terengganu Amateur League trophy during Kerteh FC 2019 title celebration.

=== Manager ===
Fajar Hiliran

- Malaysia FAM Cup
  - Runners-up: 1984

Malaysia U-17

- JFA Tournament
  - Runners-up: 2003

Terengganu

- SUKMA Games
  - Winners (1): 2008

T-Team

- Malaysia Premier League
  - Runners-up: 2009

Kerteh FC

- Malaysia M4 League: Terengganu Amateur League
  - Winners (1): 2019
- TAL Cup
  - Winners (1): 2019
