= Football Association of Terengganu =

Malaysian football association

Terengganu Football Association Persatuan Bola Sepak Negeri Terengganu (PBSNT)
- Founded: 22 November 1956; 69 years ago as Terengganu Amateur Football Association
- Purpose: Football association
- Headquarters: Tingkat 2, Wisma Seri Amar, Jalan Sultan Ismail, 20200
- Location: Kuala Terengganu, Terengganu Darul Iman, Malaysia
- President: YB Ustaz Hishamuddin Abdul Karim
- Website: Website

Terengganu Football Association (TFA); Malay: Persatuan Bola Sepak Negeri Terengganu (PBSNT) is the governing body of football for the state of Terengganu , Malaysia. PBSNT is responsible for coordinating and developing regional football, and has teamed up with the Football Association of Malaysia (FAM) as the official governing body of football in Malaysia.

== History ==
=== Origins ===
It was founded on 22 November 1956 as Terengganu Amateur Football Association (Malay: Persatuan Bola Sepak Amatur Negeri Terengganu). In 1972, Terengganu Amateur Football Association was gazetted as a sports body under the Seksyen 17, Akta Pembangunan Sukan 1987, and officially known as Persatuan Bolasepak Negeri Terengganu. Terengganu FC which competes in the Malaysia Super League is under the supervision of the Terengganu State Football Association.

== Association management ==
Position	Name
President	(Malaysia) Hishamuddin Abdul Karim
Deputy president	(Malaysia)
Vice presidents	(Malaysia) Jasmira Othman
Vice presidents	(Malaysia) Apli Yusoff
Vice presidents	(Malaysia) Mohd Rashdi Hamat
Vice presidents	(Malaysia) Che Wan Mohd Azlizan Wan Abu Bakar
General secretary	(Malaysia) YBM Dato' Seri Tengku Farok Hussin bin Tengku Abdul Jalil
Treasurer	(Malaysia)
Executive committee members	(Malaysia) Zainudin Ismail
Executive committee members	(Malaysia) Haslan Hashim
Executive committee members	(Malaysia) Zaki Ismail
Executive committee members	(Malaysia) Mazlan Sulong
Executive committee members	(Malaysia) Mohd Amir Ikhwan Mohd Maniyamin
Executive committee members	(Malaysia) Shaiful Dazilan Mazlan
Executive committee members	(Malaysia) Zulkiflee Nawi
Executive committee members	(Malaysia) Yahaya Mohd Noor

== Former presidents ==
Years	Name
1999–November 2013	(Malaysia) Che Mat Jusoh
November 2013–2020	(Malaysia) Wan Ahmad Nizam
2020– 8 October 2023	(Malaysia) Ahmad Samsuri Mokhtar
8 October 2023–present	(Malaysia) Hishamuddin Abdul Karim

== Competitions ==
The Terengganu Football Association organises the Liga Darul Iman & and the Terengganu Amateur League for its regional level clubs.

== Affiliations ==
Clubs in the top tiers league competition affiliated to the Terengganu Football Association include:

- Terengganu, Malaysia Super League
- SATU , Malaysia A2 Amateur League
- Chukai City, Malaysia A3 Community League
- Kerteh, Malaysia A3 Community League
- Terengganu FA Futsal Team, MPFL Division 1
- T-Team/TFC II, Piala Presiden
- Kuala Terengganu Rovers, defunct
- Terengganu City, defunct
- Hanelang, defunct

=== District Football Association ===
There are 9 Football Associations affiliated to the PBSNT.

- Terengganu Malay's
- Kuala Terengganu FA
- Hulu Terengganu FA
- Kuala Nerus FA
- Kemaman FA
- Marang FA
- Besut FA
- Dungun FA
- Setiu FA

== See also ==
- Piala Presiden
- Piala Belia
- History of Malaysian football
