= Ahmad Paijan =

Singaporean footballer

Personal information
- Full name: Ahmad bin Paijan
- Date of birth: 1964 (age 61–62)
- Place of birth: Singapore
- Position: Midfielder

Senior career*
Years	Team	Apps	(Gls)
1982–1988	Tiong Bahru		
1989–1996	Terengganu		

International career
1983–1987	Singapore	15	(1)
- * Club domestic league appearances and goals

Ahmad bin Paijan is a former Singaporean football midfielder who played for Tiong Bahru and Terengganu.

== Career ==
He had a successful career with Singaporean side, Tiong Bahru, where he won 5 titles with them. After joining Malaysian side, Terengganu, he helped the team to win the Malaysia Division 2 league in 1990. In the 1992 season, he carried the team to record their highest ever finish in the Division 1 league when they finished as runner-up to Pahang.

In late 1995, he became the second Malaysian naturalised player after Razali Alias when he received his Malaysian citizenship after 13 years of playing for Terengganu. Thus, Terengganu registered him as a local player in 1996 but he couldn't represent Malaysia because he had played for Singapore national team.

== Honours ==
=== Club ===
Tiong Bahru

- National Football League Division One: 1983, 1987
- President's Cup: 1982, 1985, 1987

Terengganu

- Malaysia Division 2: 1990
