= 1995–96 Golden season =

Golden
1995–96 season
- League: 3rd
- Shield: Runners-up
- Viceroy Cup: Semi-final
- FA Cup: Runners-up

The 1995–96 Golden season is the 2nd edition of Golden, the precursor of Sun Hei SC in Hong Kong First Division League.

== Squad statistics ==
No.	Pos.	Name	League		Shield		Viceroy Cup		FA Cup		Total	
No.	Pos.	Name	Apps	Goals	Apps	Goals	Apps	Goals	Apps	Goals	Apps	Goals
1	GK	(Hong Kong) Chan Hing Wing										
2	DF	(Hong Kong) Pang Kam Chuen										1
3	DF	(Hong Kong) Tang Chi Ming										
4	DF	(Hong Kong) Yau Wo Kan										
5	DF	(England) Mike Duxbury										
6	DF	(Netherlands) Marlon van der Sander										4
7	FW	(Scotland) Lee Bullen										12
8	MF	(Hong Kong) Yeung Kin Keung										
9	MF	(England) Mark Grainger										1
10	MF	(Grenada) Otis Roberts										3
11	FW	(Bosnia and Herzegovina) Anto Grabo										16
12	MF	(Hong Kong) Chiu Chung Man										7
13	MF	(England) Carlton Fairweather										7
14	MF	(Hong Kong) Lee Fuk Wing										4
16	DF	(Hong Kong) Lo Kai Wah										5
18	DF	(Hong Kong) Leung Shing Kit										1
21	GK	(Hong Kong) Kan Shun Cheong										
22	GK	(Hong Kong) Mak Kwok Fai										
–	–	Own goals	–		–		–		–		–	

Statistics accurate as of match played 31 May 1996
