= List of Malaysia international footballers born outside Malaysia =

This is a list of Malaysia international footballers born outside their country, including naturalised and overseas players with Malaysian ancestry.

== Introduction ==
In January 1984, Razali Alias of Singapore became the first naturalised player in Malaysia. He made his debut for the Malaysia national team in a friendly match against the United Arab Emirates in March 1985. The Football Association of Malaysia (FAM) tried to register him for the 1986 FIFA World Cup qualification, however, FIFA prevented him from participating as he was already capped for Singapore. The second naturalised player in Malaysia was Ahmad Paijan of Singapore who received his Malaysian citizenship in late 1995 after 13 years of playing for Terengganu.

In late 2018, there have been more necessities to naturalising foreign players to improve Malaysian football performances. Based on three survey polls conducted by the country three local press, two of them recording a majority positive vote over the necessities to acquire foreign players as a local players. As a result, the FAM began submitting a plan to the federal government. The plan was welcomed by the country's prime minister with the latter also urging local talents to improve on par with the absorption of foreign talents.

== Players ==
List of Malaysia international footballers born outside Malaysia
Name	Country of birth	Citizenship acquisition	Debut for Malaysia
Razali Alias (Note: Razali was also capped for Singapore.)	Singapore	18 January 1984	28 February 1985
Syed Adney	England	1986	21 October 2007
Matthew Davies	Australia	2015	8 September 2015
Brendan Gan	Australia	2014	24 March 2016
Darren Lok	England	2016	7 October 2016
Kiko Insa	Spain	2017	22 August 2017
Natxo Insa	Spain	2017	22 March 2018
Mohamadou Sumareh	Gambia	27 July 2018	12 October 2018
La'Vere Corbin-Ong (Note: Corbin-Ong was also capped for Canada in 2017.)	England	2018	2 June 2019
Dominic Tan	Singapore	1997	2 June 2019
Liridon Krasniqi (Note: Krasniqi was also capped for Kosovo between 2014 and 2015.)	Yugoslavia	February 2020	28 May 2021
Guilherme de Paula	Brazil	March 2021	3 June 2021
Quentin Cheng	Australia	2019	6 October 2021
Ezequiel Agüero	Argentina	February 2022	9 December 2022
Lee Tuck	England	February 2022	9 December 2022
David Rowley	Australia	2018	9 December 2022
Stuart Wilkin	England	2021	9 December 2022
Endrick	Brazil	February 2023	23 March 2023
Paulo Josué	Brazil	February 2023	23 March 2023
Nooa Laine	Finland	2022	23 March 2023
Daniel Ting	England	2016	28 March 2023
Romel Morales	Colombia	2023	15 January 2024
Fergus Tierney	Scotland	2023	18 November 2024
Hector Hevel	Netherlands	2025	25 March 2025
Gabriel Palmero	Spain	2025	29 May 2025
João Figueiredo	Brazil	2025	10 June 2025
Jon Irazabal	Spain	2025	10 June 2025
Rodrigo Holgado	Argentina	2025	10 June 2025
Imanol Machuca	Argentina	2025	10 June 2025
Facundo Garcés	Argentina	2025	10 June 2025
Richard Chin	England	2023	8 September 2025
Wan Kuzain	United States	2026	25 July 2026
Bérgson	Brazil	2026	25 September 2026
Manuel Hidalgo	Argentina	2026	25 September 2026
Brad Tapp	Australia	2026	25 September 2026
Hong Wan	England	2021	1 October 2026
