= Terengganu Football League =

Football league in Malaysia

- Founded: 2015; 11 years ago as Terengganu Amateur League
- Country: Malaysia
- Confederation: AFC
- Divisions: Super League; Premier League
- Number of clubs: Super League: 10; Premier League: 10
- Feeder to: Malaysia A2 Amateur League
- Domestic cup(s): Malaysia FA Cup; TAL Cup
- Most championships: Kerteh F.C.

Terengganu Football League is a football league held in Terengganu, Malaysia. It is the 4th-5th tier in Malaysia football league system.

It was established in 2015 by Terengganu Football Association to provide an alternative entry point for young players.

== Champions ==
=== Super League ===
Season	Champions	Runners-up
Terengganu Amateur League
2014	Kerteh F.C.	
2015	Norlan United	
2016	Kerteh F.C.	
2017	Besut F.A.	Terengganu U21
2018	Besut United	Real Chukai F.C.
2019	Besut United	PBSMT
2020–21	Not held due to the COVID-19 pandemic	
Terengganu Football League
2022	Besut F.A.	Setiu F.A.
2023	Besut F.A.	Felcra Bukit Sudu FC

=== Premier League ===
Season	Champions	Runners-up
Terengganu Amateur League
2018	DSPEX FC	Markless ST
2019	Kerteh F.C.	Delima Warriors
2020–21	Not held due to the COVID-19 pandemic	
Terengganu Football League

=== TAL Cup ===
No.	Winners	Runners-up	Score in final
2015	Delima Warriors	Kebilal FC	2–1
2017	Real Chukai	PBSMT-Lanjerket	3–2
2018	Banggol Tokku	MD Besut	2–2 (a.e.t.) 5–4 (PSO)
2019	Kerteh F.C.	Markless ST	0–0 (a.e.t.) 4–3 (PSO)

== Performance by club (2015–present) ==
Club	Winners	Runners-up
Kerteh F.C.	1 (2019)	
Banggol Tokku	1 (2018)	
Delima Warriors	1 (2015)	
Real Chukai	1 (2017)	
Kebilal FC		1 (2015)
PBSMT-Lanjerket		1 (2017)
MD Besut		1 (2018)
Markless ST		1 (2019)

== Sponsorship ==
Since 2017

- Norlan United
- Semuanya Bola
- Matt Barbershop
- Kaki Jersi
- FLN Enterprise
- Power Mania Gym
- Visit Terengganu
