= Ngweni Ndassi =

Cameroonian footballer

Personal information
- Full name: Ngweni Ndassi Kadiang
- Date of birth: 12 July 1996 (age 30)
- Position: Defender

Team information
- Current team: Terengganu
- Number: 4

Senior career*
Years	Team	Apps	(Gls)
2010–2015	Njala Quan Sports Academy		
2015–2016	Unisport Bafang		
2016–2018	Union Douala		
2018–2019	Coton Sport		
2019–2020	Chabab Rif Al Hoceima		
2020–2021	Kano Pillars		
2021–2023	Rivers United		
2023–2024	Jeddah		
2024–2026	Al-Talaba	43	(0)
2026-	Terengganu		

International career^{‡}
2015	Cameroon	4	(1)
- * Club domestic league appearances and goals ‡ National team caps and goals as of 30 March 2015

Ngweni Ndassi Kadiang (born 12 July 1996) is a Cameroonian professional footballer who plays as a defender for Malaysia Super League club Terengganu.

On 29 July 2023, Ndassi joined Saudi First Division League club Jeddah.

== Career statistics ==
=== International goals ===
Score and Result list Cameroon's goal tally first

No.	Date	Venue	Opponent	Score	Result	Competition	Ref.
1.	30 March 2015	Rajamangala Stadium, Bangkok, Thailand	Thailand	3–2	3–2	Friendly	
