= Razali Alias =

Singaporean footballer and coach

Personal information
- Full name: Mohamed Razali bin Alias
- Date of birth: 17 September 1961
- Place of birth: Singapore
- Date of death: 27 January 2012 (aged 51)
- Place of death: Selayang, Malaysia
- Height: 1.75 m (5 ft 9 in)
- Position: Striker

Senior career*
Years	Team	Apps	(Gls)
????–????	Armed Forces FC		
????–1980	Kaki Bukit SC		
1981–1981	Cairnhill FC		
1977–1981	Singapore FA		
1982–1992	Selangor FA		

International career
1980–1982	Singapore	19	(5)
1985	Malaysia	2	(0)

Managerial career
- 2005–2007: Selangor FA (assistant head coach)
- 2007–2008: Proton FC (head coach)
- 2009: ATM FA (head coach)
- * Club domestic league appearances and goals

Mohamed Razali bin Alias (17 September 1961 – 27 January 2012) was a Singaporean football player and coach.

== Playing career ==
=== Club career ===
Razali started his career with the Singapore FA team in 1977. In 1981, along with Tohari bin Paijan, Razali was found guilty of accepting bribes to win or lose matches during the 10th Marah Halim tournament.

In 1982, Razali was offered to join either Terengganu FC or Selangor FA but declined both offers as he wished to be employed in Singapore and play for the Singapore national football team. However, Razali eventually joined Selangor FA after his National Football League club, Cairnhill FC, released him

Razali would go on to help Selangor FA to win Malaysia Cup championship in 1982, 1984 and 1986. In the 1986 Malaysia Cup final, Razali scored the equalizing goal with a volley as Selangor came back from 1-0 deficit to win 6-1 against Johor FA.

=== International career ===
Razali also has played for the Singapore national football team in the 1982 FIFA World Cup qualification matches. He was later not selected for Singapore after acquiring Malaysian citizenship while playing for Selangor. Later in 1985 Football Association of Malaysia invited Razali to join Malaysia national football team for the 1986 FIFA World Cup qualification matches, based on his acquired citizenship. He made his debut in a friendly match against United Arab Emirates in March 1985 thus becoming the first naturalized player for Malaysia. However FIFA blocked Razali from playing for Malaysia as he has played for Singapore.

== Coaching career ==
After he retired from playing, Razali worked as assistant coach for Selangor FA from 2005 until 2007. He then coached Proton FC and ATM FA in 2008 and 2009 respectively and served as general manager of ATM FA from 2010 until 2011.

== Personal life ==
Razali is married to his longtime girlfriend Rosnah at the age of 24, and has five children in total. Two sons, Raqib and Wasim Akram, and 3 daughters, Raihan, Yasmin, and Siti Umairah. Razali died at the age of 51 on 27 January 2012 in Selayang Hospital, after suffering from Hepatitis B since 2008. Both Football Association of Singapore and Football Association of Selangor, the only two teams Razali played for, placed obituaries on their websites.

== Honours ==
=== Selangor ===
- Liga Semi-Pro Divisyen 1: 1989, 1990
- Malaysia Cup: 1982, 1984, 1986

=== Singapore U16 ===
- Lion City Cup: 1977
