= Nafuzi Zain =

Malaysian footballer and coach

Personal information
- Full name: Mohd Nafuzi bin Mohd Zain
- Date of birth: 27 October 1978 (age 48)
- Place of birth: Kelantan, Malaysia
- Position: Midfielder

Team information
- Current team: Terengganu (head coach)

Youth career
- 1996–1997: Kelantan

Senior career*
Years	Team	Apps	(Gls)
1998–2001	Terengganu		
2002–2007	Kedah		
2008–2010	Kelantan		

International career
1994	Malaysia U-17		
1997	Malaysia U20		

Managerial career
- 2013: Kelantan U21 (assistant)
- 2014: Kelantan U21
- 2015: Kelantan FA (assistant)
- 2015: Kelantan U21
- 2016: T-Team U21
- 2017–2019: Terengganu (assistant)
- 2019–2022: Terengganu
- 2022–2024: Kedah Darul Aman
- 2024–2026: Malaysia U23
- 2026: Malaysia U19
- 2026–: Terengganu
- * Club domestic league appearances and goals

Mohd Nafuzi bin Mohd Zain (born 27 October 1978) is a Malaysian football coach and former football player who is currently the head coach of Malaysia Super League club Terengganu.

== Career ==
Nafuzi played in the Kelantan youth teams between 1996 and 1997. In 1998, he had an offer to play with Terengganu senior squads. With Terengganu, he won Malaysia FA Cup in 2000 and Malaysia Cup in 2001. After that, he transferred to Kedah which he had successfully won treble with them in 2007. Nafuzi signs with his former youth team, Kelantan in 2008.

As a national player, he also was part of the Malaysia squad at the 1997 FIFA World Youth Championship when Malaysia became a host tournament.

After retired as footballer, he ventured into coaching in 2011.

== Managerial statistics ==
As of match played 20 November 2026

Managerial record by team and tenure
Team	Nat.	From	To	Record					Ref.
Team	Nat.	From	To	G	W	D	L	Win %	Ref.
Terengganu	(Malaysia)	15 May 2019	30 November 2022	94	54	16	24	57.45	
Kedah Darul Aman	(Malaysia)	6 December 2022	25 November 2024	51	25	8	18	49.02	
Malaysia U23	(Malaysia)	16 December 2024	18 June 2026	13	4	1	8	30.77	
Malaysia U19	(Malaysia)	7 May 2026	18 June 2026	3	2	0	1	66.67	
Terengganu	(Malaysia)	30 June 2026	Present	9	2	2	5	22.22	
Career Total				170	87	27	56	51.18	

== Honours ==
=== As player ===
==== Terengganu ====
- Malaysia FA Cup: 2000
- Malaysia Cup: 2001

==== Kedah ====
- Malaysia Super League: 2006/07
- Malaysia FA Cup: 2007
- Malaysia Cup: 2007

=== As head coach ===
==== Kelantan U21 ====
- Malaysian President's Cup: 2015

==== Terengganu ====
- Malaysia Super League runner-up: 2022
- Malaysia FA Cup runner-up: 2022

==== Individual ====
- FAM Football Awards – Best Coach: 2022
