= Kerteh F.C. =

Kerteh
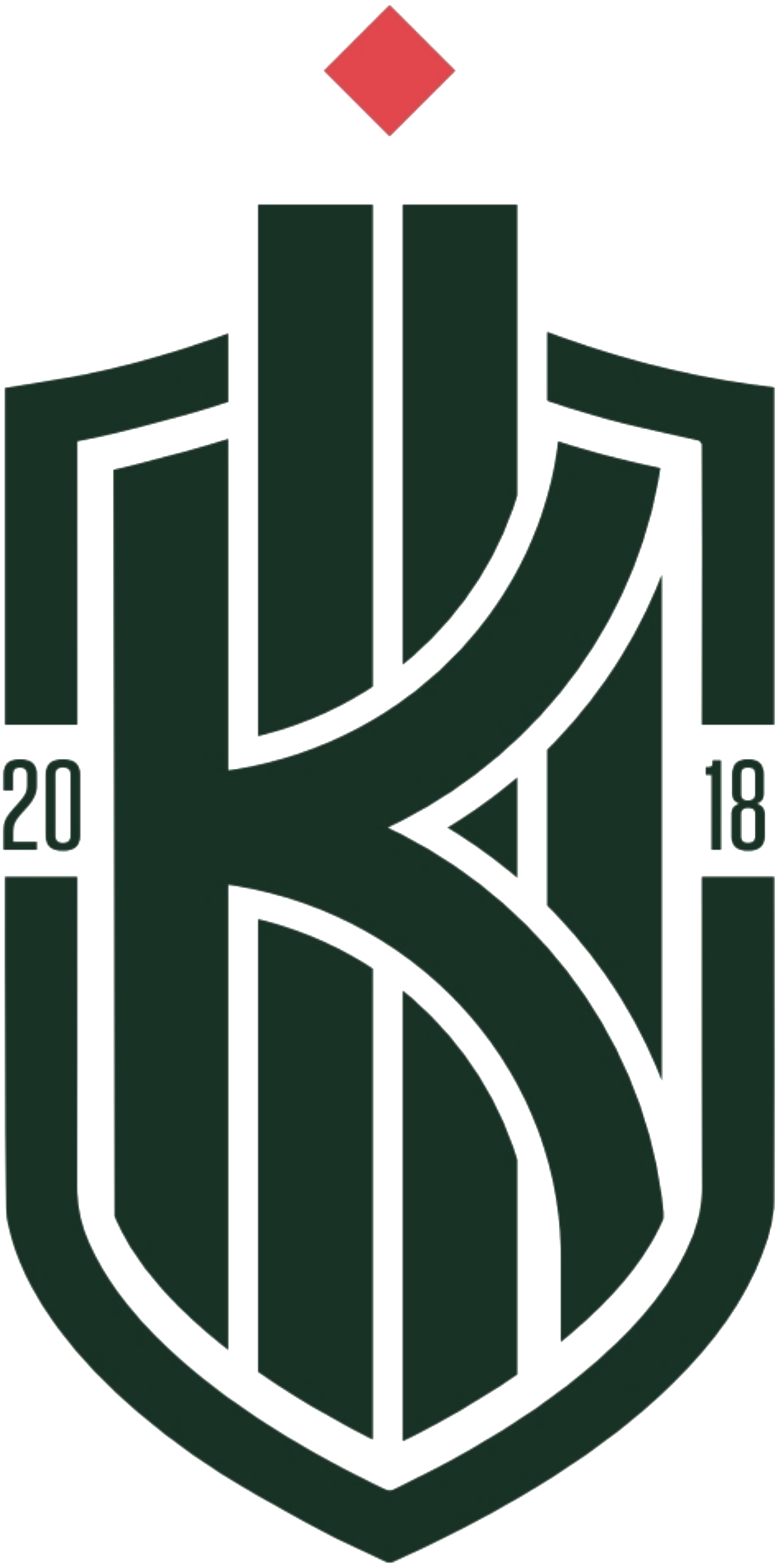
- Full name: Kerteh Football Club
- Nickname: The Oilers
- Short name: Kerteh FC
- Founded: 25 September 2018; 7 years ago
- Stadium: Kerteh Sports City
- Capacity: 500
- Owner: KAL Services Sdn. Bhd.
- President: Mohd Razeman Mat Nashim
- Manager: Mohd Rozi Taib
- League: Terengganu Amateur League
- Website: https://kertehfc.com/

Kerteh Football Club (Malay: Kelab Bola Sepak Kerteh), commonly referred to as Kerteh FC and nicknamed The Oilers, is a football club based in Kerteh, Terengganu, Malaysia. Founded in 2018, the club competes in the Terengganu Amateur League (TAL), which is part of the Malaysia A3 Community League, the fourth tier of the Malaysian football league system.

The Oilers won the Terengganu Amateur League and TAL Cup in their debut season. Since its inception, Kerteh FC has had a fierce rivalry with Real Chukai FC, another Kemaman-based side. The rivalry between the two clubs has been dubbed as the Kemaman Derby by the supporters.

== History ==
=== Beginnings ===
Kerteh FC was initially founded in July 2017 by Syed Khairi Amier Syed Radzuan, Ramzan Ibrahim and Muhamad Badrrol Idris from Kerteh-based non-governmental organisation Gabungan Pemuda-Pemuda Islam (GAPPs), which organised various sports tournaments since 2008.

=== Inaugural season and progress ===
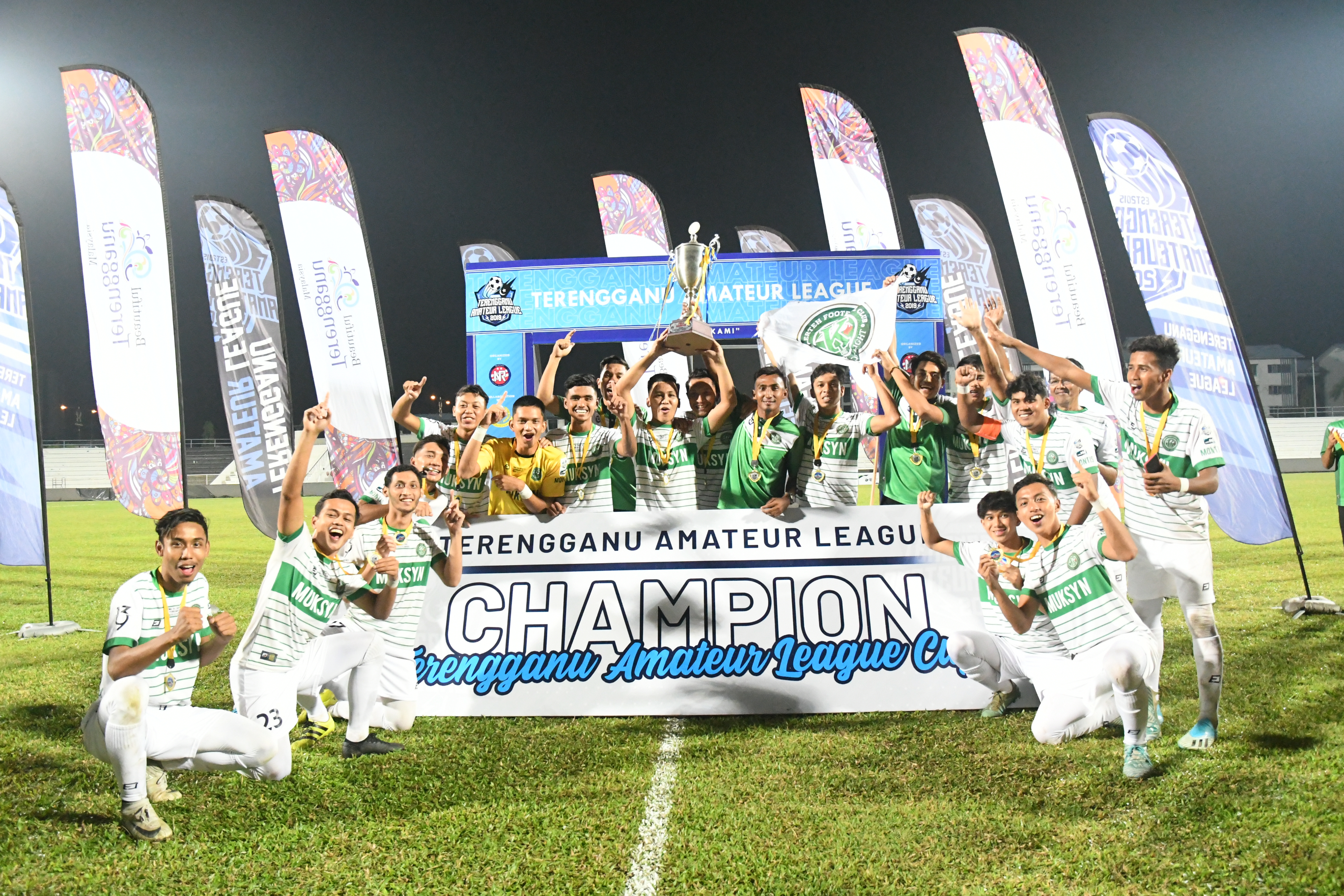
Kerteh FC celebrate winning the TAL Cup in 2019

The club was officially formed on 25 September 2018 and had its first competitive match on 25 October 2019 in the Terengganu Amateur League. Under Kamal Rodiarjat's stewardship, the club won the league and cup in 2019, and qualified for the 2020 Malaysia FA Cup.

The club made its FA Cup debut against Northern Lions FC in the preliminary stage, losing 2–0 at the Mak Chilli Stadium, Kemaman.

== Ownership and finances ==
=== KAL Services Sdn. Bhd. ===
The holding company of Kerteh Football Club, KAL Services Sdn. Bhd. is a special purpose vehicle (SPV) established to guarantee the financial sustainability and commercial growth of the club. Apart from the business of football, the company engages in other business activities related to the oil and gas, marine and construction industries, with all proceeds from revenues generated going towards the club. On 5 December 2020, the club announced that INKA Creative Agency based in Kuala Lumpur acquired 10% shares of the company.

=== Financial statements and recognition ===
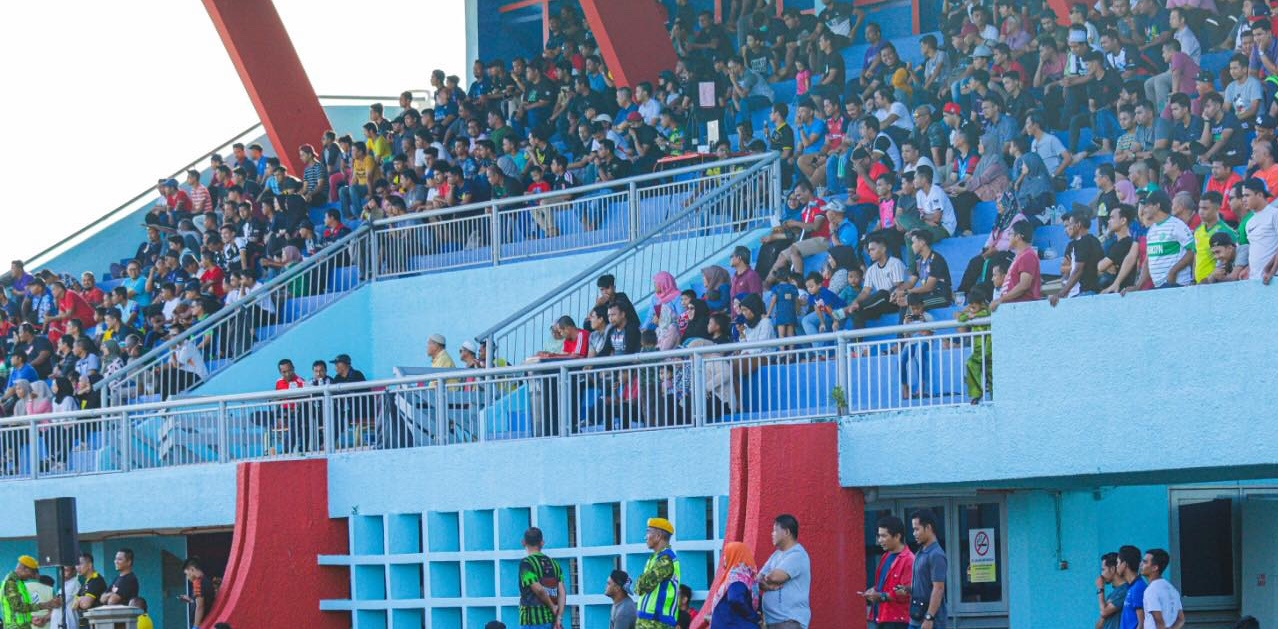
Kerteh FC fans at the Mak Chilli Stadium during a match against Northern Lions FC in the 2020 Malaysia FA Cup preliminary round

Despite being a lower-tier club, Kerteh FC is regarded as one of the most profitable football clubs in the country, earning praises from the Football Association of Malaysia.

The club recorded 20.9% in profit for the ending year of 2018. In 2019, Kerteh FC's revenue increased by 232.8%. The club also diversified its income sources, mainly through businesses which included oil and gas, soccer schools, match livestreaming, advertising, grassroots leagues, and merchandising. Despite the COVID-19 pandemic, the club managed to record a profit of 4% for the year ending in 2020. On 15 June 2020, Kerteh FC received an invitation to join the Malaysia External Trade Development Corporation (MATRADE) to share experiences, opinions and various technical and commercial information on community club development.

== Brand and identity ==
=== Crest and colours ===
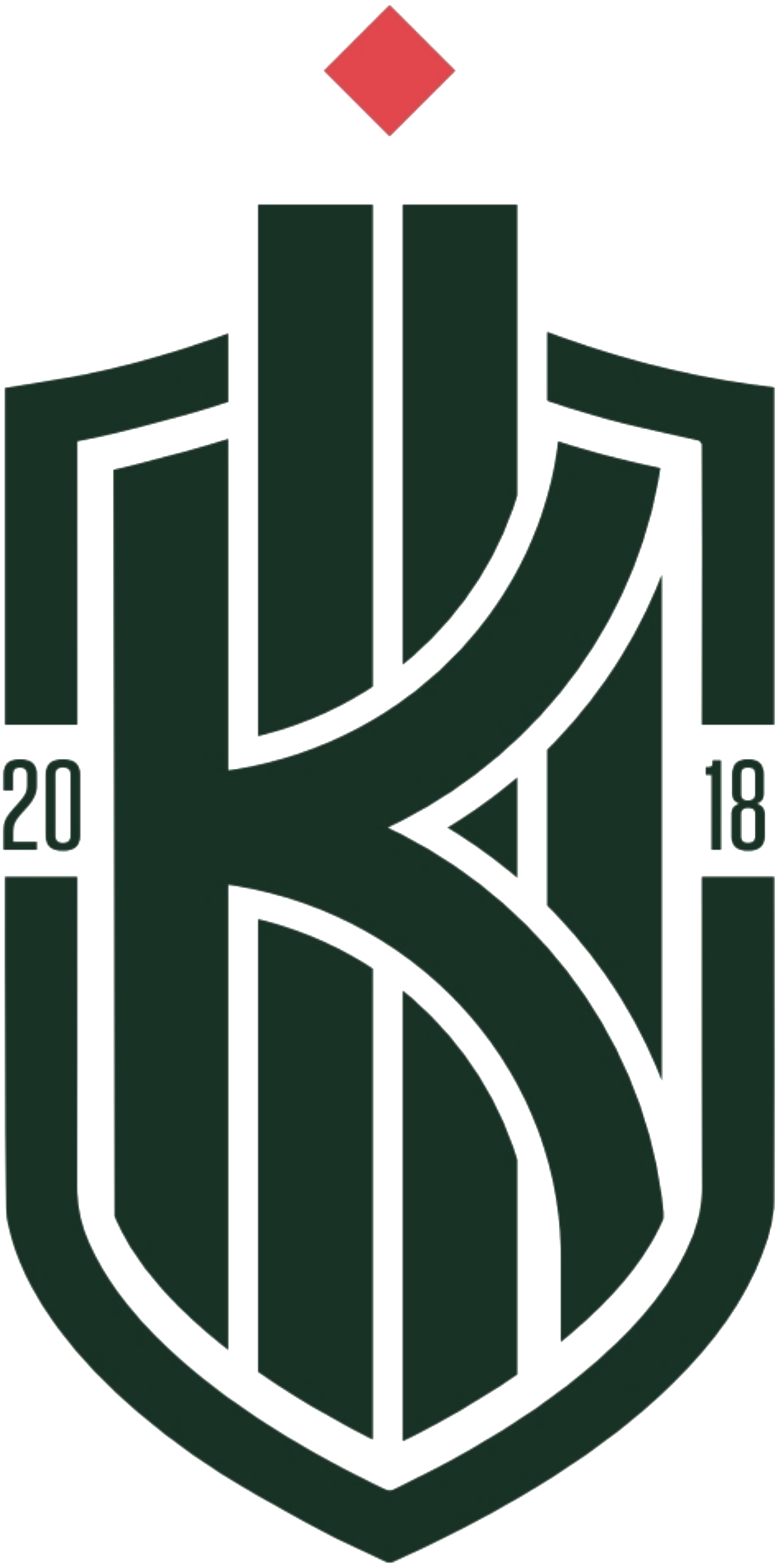
Second logo (2021–present)

After the shares acquisition by INKA Creative, the club underwent a total rebranding and unveiled a new logo. The new logo took a major inspiration from petroleum processing plants in Kerteh and features the initial letter of the club's name and area. It also retained several design elements from the old logo such as a red gemstone, inspired by flames emitted from tall chimneys by the sea, a sight synonymous with the city. The club's branding efforts are widely praised among observer and football fans in Malaysia.

=== Kits ===
Kerteh FC's kit was initially manufactured by Thai sportswear company Pegan Sport in 2018. From the 2021 season onward, the club kits have been produced and sponsored by local sportswear company Vayorken, including for the first team, academy team and Esport team.

Period	Kit Manufacturer	Shirt Sponsor (chest)	Shirt Sponsor (back)	Shirt Sponsor (sleeve)
2018	(Thailand) Pegan Sport	Iman Offshore Engineering & Services	–	NUR E&I
2019–2020	(Malaysia) Elklasiko	Muksyn Engineering & Services	ELklasiko; Maz Travel	Montis Inspection & Services; 139associates
2021–present	(Malaysia) Vayorken			

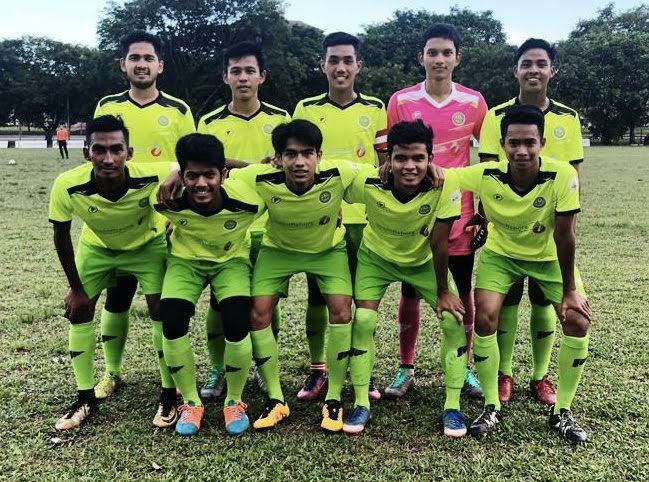
Kerteh FC team photo in 2018 wearing their first ever home kit

The club's official colours are green and white, after initially starting with fluorescent green in 2018. In its first season in the Malaysia League, its home kit was green with white hoops and their away kit was green with dark green stripes. Their alternate uniform is pitch red in colour. In 2020, a special edition jersey was produced due to the year's cancellation of the Malaysia M4 League by Malaysian Football League.

=== Special edition jersey ===
In June 2020, Kerteh FC released a special jersey called 'Kerteh FC Jersey 2020 #StayAtHome Edition' in tribute to the lockdown caused by the COVID-19 pandemic in Malaysia. Each jersey has its own serial number at the bottom. The jersey also has the words 'Perintah Kawalan Pergerakan' with the date '18.3.2020 – 9.6.2020' on the chest in remembrance of the Malaysian movement control order implemented by the government. The number 20 on the back of the jersey symbolises the year of 2020, when the COVID-19 pandemic started in Malaysia. Due to high demand, the jersey was re-released in September 2020 and again in July 2021.

2020 (Special Edition)

=== Anthem ===
On 4 February 2019, the club released its official anthem titled Kerteh FC (The Oilers) – The City of Light. Written and composed by Azizul Hj Umar, the song was sung by the Malaysian singer Oja.

Original Malay Lyrics

Bukan tunjuk belang,
Demi kejayaan,
Bangkit semangat hingga ke puncak gemilang,

Lawan siapa sahaja,
Mara dengan gaya,
Sepak bola sehingga kita juara,

Biar putih tulang,
Bukan putih mata,
Ayuh kita laungkan bersama,

Oohhh...Satukan suara!
The Oilers,
Ooohh...Siapa juara?
Kerteh FC!
Ooohh...Kitalah juara!
The Oilers!
Ooohh...The city of light!

== Stadium ==
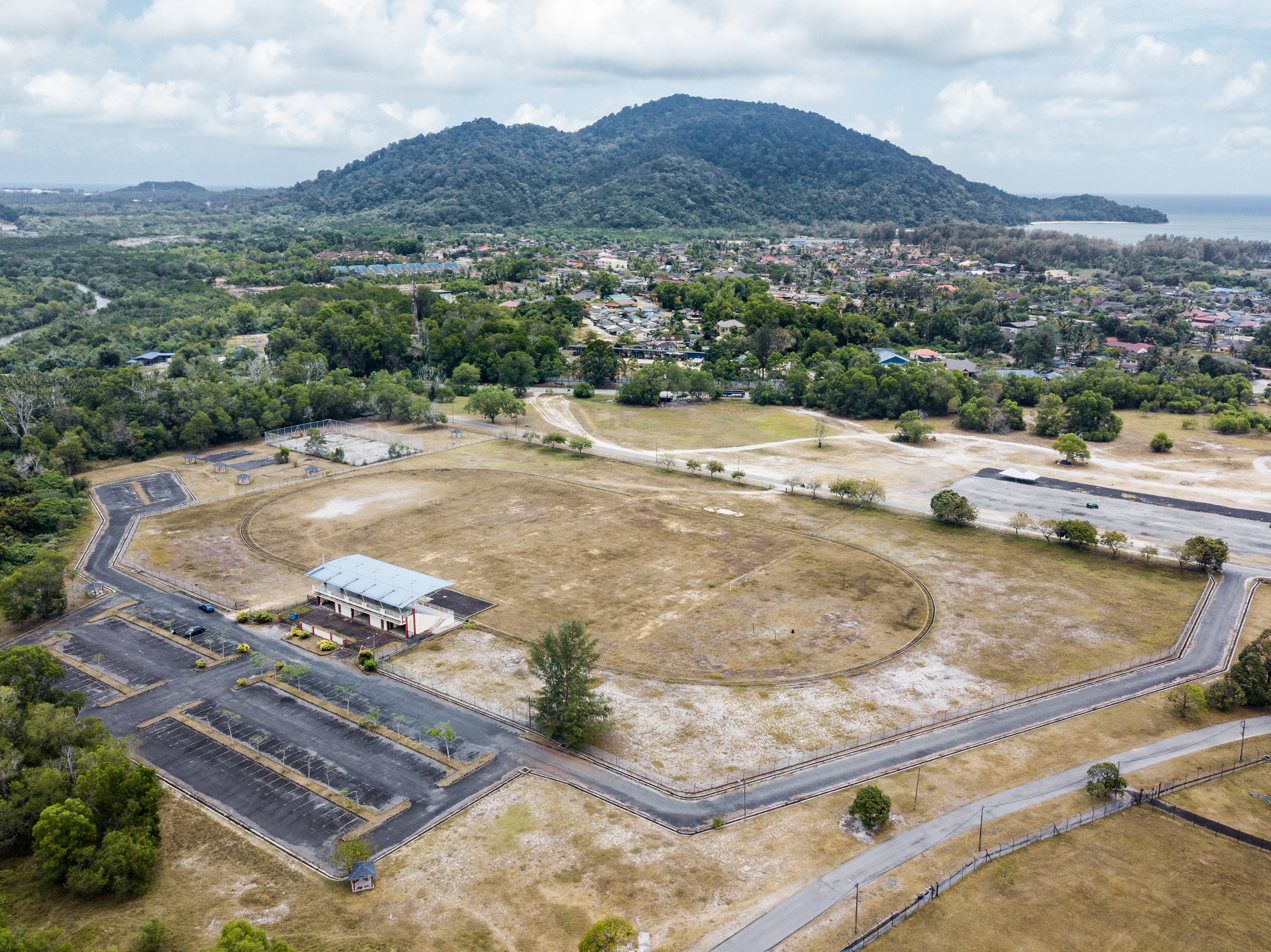
Bird's-eye view of Kertih Mini Stadium in early 2021 before the commencement of Kerteh Sports City development project

The club played home matches on different grounds around the Kemaman district since their inception. Following a meeting with Kemaman City Council on 24 June 2020, the club successfully leased the Kertih Mini Stadium to be their home ground for the 2021 season. The lease comes with a piece of 8.49-hectare land surrounding the mini stadium, which the club intends to develop into the Kerteh Sports City that includes other sport facilities. The club has also secured Red Antlers Sdn. Bhd. as an investor for the development project and issued opportunities to potential brand partners interested with the naming rights of the upcoming stadium.

== Football development ==
Kerteh FC has its own academy and elite development programme as part of its long-term plan to focus on nurturing football talents and helps encourage a healthy lifestyle and drive football participation among the people in Kerteh and Kemaman. Training players from as young as the Under-8 age group, its development programme is prepared by the club's Technical Advisor from Spain, Oscar Riera Alvarez. Besides football training, the players are provided with scholarships by the club and enrolled into the best schools in Kerteh or Kemasik, and opportunities to study in college or university in Kemaman. The club aims to operates several more soccer schools outside of Terengganu by 2026.

=== Affiliated club ===
On 5 September 2020, Barcelona-based Unió Esportiva Sant Andreu announced an official partnership with Kerteh FC, which made the Malaysian club part of the Spanish side's International Association Program. The collaboration allows Kerteh FC academy players to be nurtured by Sant Andreu coaches and provides them with opportunities and benefits to help with their development. The best players from the U-18 squad are sent for trial and training stint, while those missing the chance to go to Spain are absorbed into the Senior B, the feeder team for the main squad.

=== Grassroots efforts ===
Kerteh FC organised the Kemasik Grassroot Cup in 2018 and worked together with partners such as RHB Bank Kerteh in providing training scholarships to underprivileged children with exceptional football talents. The club also established the Kemasik Amateur League in the same year with the purpose of scouting talents within Kerteh and Kemasik. In its inaugural season, eight teams took part in the league competition spanning for approximately six months. Participating teams are provided with grants, courses and programmes to help them with their finances, training and management.

On 4 December 2020, the club was awarded the Bronze Member of FAM SupaRimau Charter, an endorsement tool to support football academies in their roles of implementing grassroots programmes and activities, by Football Association of Malaysia.

== Players ==
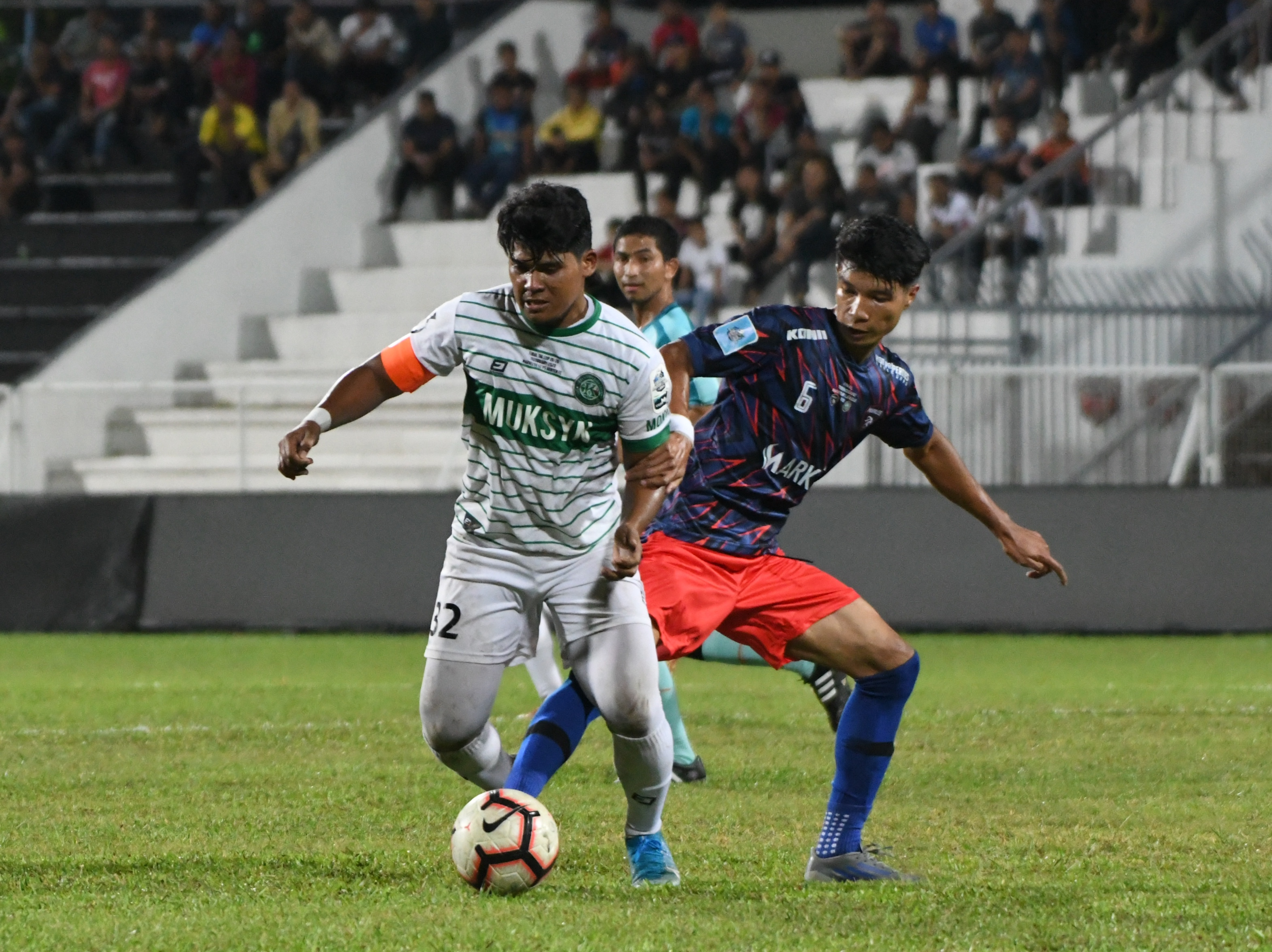
Kerteh FC captain Ramadhan Jalil in action during their final match of 2019 Terengganu Amateur League against Markless ST

=== First-team squad (2020) ===
Number	Name	Nationality	Position	Date of birth (age)
Goalkeepers
1	Muhammad Syazwan Aiman Zulkifli	Malaysia	GK	4 June 1999 (age 26)
31	Muhammad Syawal Azri Zulkipeli	Malaysia	GK	8 February 1998 (age 27)
25	Muhammad Azraei Nuqman Azhari	Malaysia	GK	14 December 2000 (age 24)
Defenders
4	Mohamad Rafiq Razak	Malaysia	LB	9 May 1997 (age 28)
18	Muhamad Yusof Ramli	Malaysia	LB	6 October 1997 (age 28)
29	Muhammad Irfan Firdaus Maidin	Malaysia	LB	3 April 2002 (age 23)
24	Wan Muhammad Idham Wan Ahmad Hasbullah	Malaysia	LB	24 January 2002 (age 23)
2	Wan Hanizam Alif Wan Ab Rahim	Malaysia	CB	18 August 1997 (age 28)
21	Muhammad Azim Mohd Shukry	Malaysia	CB / LB / RB	9 March 1995 (age 30)
12	Muhamad Amizan Azha	Malaysia	CB	9 February 1996 (age 29)
20	Muhammad Akif Zamry	Malaysia	RB	8 June 1996 (age 29)
26	Muhammad Adib Fahmi Ramli	Malaysia	RB	29 August 2001 (age 24)
14	Mohd Fakhrul Hakimie Ghani	Malaysia	RB	22 July 1998 (age 27)
Midfielders
32	Mohd Ramadhan Jalil (captain)	Malaysia	DM	14 January 1998 (age 27)
19	Adib Humaidi Baharuddin	Malaysia	DM	19 September 1994 (age 31)
17	Muhammad Hafidz Zahari	Malaysia	CM	27 May 1995 (age 30)
13	Muhammad Hakimi Daniel Sabri	Malaysia	CM	9 April 2002 (age 23)
10	Muhammad Syahmi Aiman Mohd Zaki	Malaysia	AM	17 March 1998 (age 27)
6	Wan Amir Ikram Wan Sazali	Malaysia	AM	21 July 2003 (age 22)
Forwards
3	Hamizzal Halija Ghazali	Malaysia	LW	25 August 1994 (age 31)
37	Muhammad Syarmeer Iman Shamsuddin	Malaysia	LW	14 September 1998 (age 27)
7	Muhammad Shazwan Afham Jusoh	Malaysia	RW	14 February 2000 (age 25)
23	Mohd Izzul Fadhli Mohd Fauzi	Malaysia	RW	17 November 1996 (age 29)
33	Mohd Al-Akraaf Mohd Kamal	Malaysia	ST	25 December 1996 (age 28)
5	Tuan Afif Nasrullah Tuan Hazahar	Malaysia	ST	22 November 1997 (age 28)
11	Mohd Hazwan Zakaria	Malaysia	CF	17 May 1993 (age 32)
9	Muhammad Ismadaniel Mohd Ismayus	Malaysia	CF	-

=== Club captain ===
Name	Nationality	Years
Mohd Ramadhan Jalil	Malaysia	2018–2020

== Management and staff (2020) ==
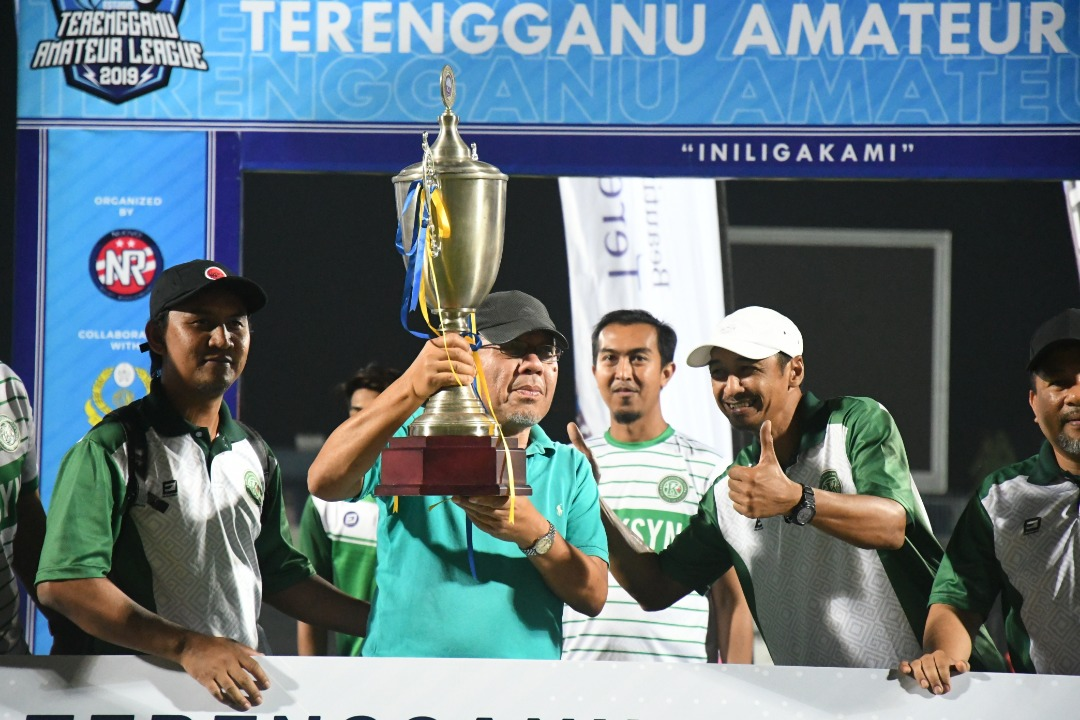
Kerteh FC officials with the Terengganu Amateur League trophy during their 2019 title celebration.

=== KAL Services Sdn. Bhd. ===
Position	Name
Board of directors	(Malaysia) Mohd Razeman Mat Nashim (Malaysia) Syed Khairi Amier Syed Radzuan (Malaysia) Che Muhammad Bukhari Che M. Razali
Non-executive directors	(Malaysia) Wan Norazam Munir Wan Arifin (Malaysia) Mohd Khusyairi Kusmaniirat (Malaysia) Ramzan Ibrahim (Malaysia) Mohd Shahrim Ibni Hajjal
Chief executive officer	(Malaysia) Syed Khairi Amier Syed Radzuan
Chief finance officer	(Malaysia) Che Muhammad Bukhari Che M. Razali
General manager	(Malaysia) Mohammad Taslim Mohd Razin

=== Kerteh Football Club ===
Position	Name
President	(Malaysia) Mohd Razeman Mat Nashim
Vice president	(Malaysia) Mohd Khusyairi Kusmaniirat
General secretary	(Malaysia) Mohd Shahrim Ibni Hajjal
Treasurer	(Malaysia) Che Muhammad Bukhari Che M. Razali
Technical Advisor	(Spain) Oscar Riera Alvarez
Technical director	(Malaysia) Che Ku Marzuki Che Ku Mohd Noor
Marketing consultant	(Malaysia) IMC Sports and Entertainment
Media director	(Malaysia) Mohd Ridzuan Mansor
Team manager	(Malaysia) Mohd Rozi Taib
Head coach	(Malaysia) Shafib Salmi Muda
Assistant coach	(Malaysia) Fazli Mohamad
Fitness coach	(Malaysia) Shafib Salmi Muda
Goalkeeping coach	(Malaysia) Noordin Pidalah
Kitmen	(Malaysia) Abidin Syafiqin Yusof
Kitmen	(Malaysia) Mohd Azri Yusof
Head of grassroots	(Malaysia) Mohd Alhafiz Ab Aziz

== Head coach history ==
Name	From	To	Honours
(Malaysia) Mohd Nasuha Abdullah	1 June 2018	30 November 2018	
(Malaysia) Kamal Rodiarjat Md Ali	1 December 2018	28 February 2020	2019 Terengganu Amateur League; 2019 TAL Cup
(Malaysia) Shafib Salmi Muda	1 January 2021	Present	

== Honours ==
=== Domestic ===
==== League ====
- Malaysia M4 League: Terengganu Amateur League
  - Winners (1): 2019

=== Cups ===
- TAL Cup
  - Winners (1): 2019

== Season statistics ==
As of 16 February 2020

Key:

- Pld = Played, W = Won, D = Drawn, L = Lost, F = Goals for, A = Goals against, GD = Goal difference, Pts= Points, Pos = Position

1st or Champions 2nd or Runner-up 3rd place Promotion Relegation

Season	Domestic league										Domestic cup				Continental	Top goalscorer	
Season	Division	Pld	W	D	L	F	A	GD	Pts	Pos	Charity	Malaysia	FA	TAL	Continental	Player	Goals
2019	Malaysia M4 League	8	5	1	2	18	13	+5	16	1st	–	–	–	Champions	–	(Malaysia) Izzul Fadhli	10
2020	Malaysia M4 League	Cancelled due to COVID-19									–	–	Preliminary	–	–	–	–
2021	Malaysia M4 League	Cancelled due to COVID-19									–	–	–	–	–	–	
