= Marlon van der Sander =

Dutch footballer

Marlon Ricardo Van Der Sander
Personal information
- Date of birth: 2 October 1961 (age 65)
- Place of birth: Netherlands
- Position: Defender

Senior career*
Years	Team	Apps	(Gls)
1987–1988	RBC		
1988–1989	Halsteren		
1989	Terengganu		
1989–1990	Sportkring Sint-Niklaas		
1991–1992	Terengganu		
1993–1994	South China		
1994–1995	Golden		
1995–1997	Sun Hei		
1997–1998	Sing Tao		
2001–2003	Hong Kong FC		

International career
1996	Hong Kong XI	1	(0)
- * Club domestic league appearances and goals

Marlon Ricardo van der Sander (born 2 October 1961) is a Dutch former professional footballer who played as a defender.

== Career ==
Having played for South China, van der Sander signed for Hong Kong First Division side Golden in August 1994.

While in Hong Kong, he also was selected in a Hong Kong League XI team, composed of Hong Kong First Division League players in exhibition matches. On 26 May 1996, he played for Hong Kong XI against England in a 1–0 loss for Hong Kong XI.
