= Real Chukai F.C. =

Malaysian football club

Real Chukai
- Full name: Real Chukai Football Club
- Nickname: The Anchors
- Founded: 2015; 11 years ago
- Ground: Mak Chili Stadium
- Capacity: 2,000
- Owner: Glorious Innovation Sdn. Bhd.
- Chairman: Ahmad Mat Zin
- League: Malaysia A2 Amateur League
- 2023: 5th in East Group
- Website: Website

Real Chukai Football Club (Malay: Kelab Bola Real Chukai), is a Malaysian professional football club based in Chukai, Terengganu. The club currently competes in the Malaysia A2 Amateur League, the third division of the Malaysian football league system.

== History ==
=== Foundation and Early Years (2015–2019) ===
The club was founded in 2015 as Real Chukai Football Club with a primary vision of nurturing local youth grassroots talent in Terengganu and providing them a pathway into professional football. The club entered the Malaysian football ecosystem by competing in the fifth-tier state amateur division, the Malaysia M5 League.

In 2017, Real Chukai won its first major silverware by defeating PBSMT-Lanjerket to lift the Terengganu Amateur League (TAL) Cup. This regional success earned the club its debut in the national-level Malaysia FA Cup during the 2018 edition.

=== Stadium Management and Rise (2020–2025) ===
In early 2020, Real Chukai became the first amateur football club in Terengganu to independently manage its own stadium facilities. Through its corporate owner, Glorious Innovation Sdn. Bhd., the club signed a public-private partnership with the Kemaman Municipal Council. The agreement granted the club full commercial rights and operational control over Mak Chili Stadium, where it also established its youth development academy.

The club earned promotion to the third-tier Liga M3 (later restructured as the Malaysia A1 Semi-Pro League) for the 2022 season, establishing itself as a competitive mid-table side while prioritizing financial sustainability.

=== 2027 Rebranding ===
On 29 October 2026, the club management issued an official media statement announcing that the club would undergo a comprehensive rebranding phase. Effective January 2027, the club officially changed its name from Real Chukai FC to Chukai City Football Club. According to the organization, the transition was designed to firmly anchor the club's identity to the city of Chukai, expand its corporate and commercial presence, and foster deeper community engagement within the Kemaman district. As part of the restructuring, the club's youth academy was renamed the Chukai City Football Academy (CCFA).

== Rivalries ==
Chukai City FC shares a fierce local rivalry with Kerteh FC, the other major football club operating out of the Kemaman district. Matches between the two clubs are known locally as the Kemaman Derby.

== Kit manufacturer and shirt sponsor ==
Season	Manufacturer	Sponsor
2015–2016	Kobert	IKY Naga
2017	Kaki Jersi	Tulangis Group
2018	Kaki Jersi	None
2019	Kaki Jersi	TATI University College
2020–2023	Voltra	TATI University College

== Season by season record ==
Season	Division	Position	Malaysia Cup	Malaysian FA Cup	MFL Challenge Cup	Regional	Top scorer (all competitions)
2017	Terengganu Amateur League		DNQ	First round	–	–	
2018	Terengganu Amateur League	2nd (Premier League)	DNQ	First round	–	–	
2019	Terengganu Amateur League	4th of 10 (Super League)	DNQ	First round	–	–	
2020	Terengganu Amateur League	Cancelled due to COVID-19	DNQ	Round 1	–	–	
2021	Terengganu Amateur League	not held due to COVID-19 pandemic					
2022	Liga M3	9th of 10 (Group B)	DNQ	DNQ	–	–	(Malaysia) Amir Ashraf Hussin (2) (Malaysia) Syahzwan Fitri (2) (Malaysia) Syahmi Khazani (2) (Malaysia) Tuan Afif (2)
2023	Liga M4	5th of 5 (Zone 2)	DNQ	DNQ	–	–	(Malaysia) Izzan Syahmi Mustafa (3)

Champions	Runners-up	Third place	Promoted	Relegated

== Players ==
=== First-team squad ===
As of 19 March 2023

Note: Flags indicate national team as defined under FIFA eligibility rules; some limited exceptions apply. Players may hold more than one non-FIFA nationality.

No.	Pos.	Nation	Player
1	GK	MAS	Wan Alif Haikal
2	DF	MAS	Muhammad Syairul Aswad
5	MF	MAS	Muhammad Adhar
6	FW	MAS	Muhammad Haikal Danial
7	FW	MAS	Tuan Nasrul Naimullah
8	FW	MAS	Muhammad Syaqeer Irfan
9	FW	MAS	Tengku Muzzammil Iqram
10	MF	MAS	Mohammad Amir Ashraf
11	FW	MAS	Tuan Afif Nasrullah
12	MF	MAS	Muhammad Arman
13	FW	MAS	Ahmad Danish
14	MF	MAS	Muhammad Alif Haikal
16	MF	MAS	Iqmal Hakeem
17	MF	MAS	Muhammad Izzat Iqbal
18	MF	MAS	Muhammad Afif

No.	Pos.	Nation	Player
19	MF	MAS	Mohd Rafiq Fitri
20	MF	MAS	Mohamad Azuwan Haikal
21	DF	MAS	Ikmal Zulhaika
22	GK	MAS	Mohamad Al Hafiz Firdaus
23	FW	MAS	Ahmad Farhan
24	DF	MAS	Mohd Zahieruddin
25	DF	MAS	Mohd Asysham Asri
27	MF	MAS	Muhammad Izzan Nazran
28	DF	MAS	Ahmad Ikhbal
30	FW	MAS	Muhammad Izzan Syahmi
31	DF	MAS	Muhammad Fizuan Shakir
33	GK	MAS	Mohamad Syaffiq
42	FW	MAS	Muhammad Daniel Ashraf
77	MF	MAS	Mohammad Haidhir
99	MF	MAS	Muhammad Aiman Hakimi

== Management team ==
=== Club personnel ===
Position	Name
Manager	(Malaysia) Mohd Azmy Ali
Head coach	(Malaysia) Che Ku Marzuki
Assistant coach	(Malaysia) Wan Tarmizie Wan Jaafar
Assistant coach	(Malaysia) Fitri Abdullah
Fitness coach	(Malaysia) Faisal Affendi
Goalkeeper coach	(Malaysia) Sariduddin Khamis
Physio	(Malaysia) Aizad Danial
Kit manager	(Malaysia) Syed Yasri

== Coaches ==
Years	Name	Achievement
2015–2017	(Malaysia) Mohd Nasuha Abdullah	2017 Terengganu Amateur League; Champions
2018	(Malaysia) Mohd Fitri Abdullah	
2019–2022	(Malaysia) Mohd Nasuha Abdullah	
2023–	(Malaysia) Che Ku Marzuki	

== Honours ==
=== League ===
- Selangor Champion League All Star

(gold) Champions: 2018

- TAL Premier League

(silver) Runners-up: 2018

=== Cup ===
- TAL Cup

Champions: 2017
