= 2019 Terengganu Amateur League =

2019 TAL M4 League
- Season: 2019
- Dates: 25 October 2019 –31 December 2019
- Champions: Kerteh F.C.
- Matches: 81
- Goals: 242 (2.99 per match)
- Top goalscorer: Mohd Izzul Fadhli Mohd Fauzi (9 goals)
- Biggest home win: Kerteh F.C. 5-1 Sentul Patah
- Biggest away win: Real Chukai F.C. 1-5 Kerteh F.C.

The 2019 Terengganu Amateur League or 2019 TAL M4 League is the 4th season of the Terengganu Amateur League, the fourth-tier league in Malaysia football league system, since its establishment in 2015. It is a part of the Malaysia M4 League. A total of 20 teams compete in the league this season.

== Team ==
The following teams will be participate in the 2019 TAL M4 League.

- Besut United
- BTK CG Jaya
- CND
- CK Bintang Muda (New team)
- Delima Warriors
- Gemuda BTR
- Hulu Fighters (New team)
- Suhada FC
- FC Pemanis
- Island FC
- PBSMT
- Markless ST
- Myxini Kuala Berang
- Real Chukai
- Raja Permin
- Kerteh F.C. (New team)
- Sentul Patah FC (New team)
- Paka City (New team)
- Nor Farhan FC (New team)
- Unisza Rangers (New team)

== Result ==
=== Super League ===
Pos	Team	Pld	W	D	L	GF	GA	GD	Pts	Qualification
1	Besut United (C)	9	7	2	0	19	6	+13	23	Qualification to TAL Cup
2	PBSMT	9	5	3	1	19	9	+10	18	Qualification to TAL Cup
3	Markless ST	9	4	4	1	21	9	+12	16	Qualification to TAL Cup
4	Real Chukai	9	5	1	3	19	16	+3	16	Qualification to TAL Cup
5	BTK CG Jaya	9	2	4	3	10	10	0	10	
6	Suhada FC	9	1	4	4	9	14	−5	7	
7	Che Nordin	9	3	1	5	11	19	−8	10	
8	FC Permanis	9	2	3	4	9	20	−11	9	
9	Island FC	9	0	7	2	9	12	−3	7	
10	Myxini Kuala Berang	9	0	3	6	7	17	−10	3	

Source: Official Website
Rules for classification: 1) Points; 2) Goal difference; 3) Number of goals scored.
(C) Champions

=== Premier League ===
Pos	Team	Pld	W	D	L	GF	GA	GD	Pts	Qualification
1	Kerteh F.C. (P)	8	5	1	2	18	13	+5	16	Qualification to TAL Cup
2	Delima Warriors	8	4	3	1	16	8	+8	15	Qualification to TAL Cup
3	Gemuda	8	4	2	2	11	7	+4	14	Play-offs round
4	Hulu Fighters	8	3	3	2	12	11	+1	12	Play-offs round
5	NFFC	8	3	2	3	13	14	−1	11	
6	Raja Permin	8	3	2	3	11	12	−1	11	
7	UniSZA Rangers	8	2	2	4	10	11	−1	8	
8	CK Bintang Muda	8	2	1	5	11	21	−10	7	
9	Sentul Patah	8	2	0	6	7	12	−5	6	
10	Paka City	0	0	0	0	0	0	0	0	Club resigned and folded

Source: Official Website
Rules for classification: 1) Points; 2) Goal difference; 3) Number of goals scored.
(P) Promoted

== TAL Cup ==
=== Bracket ===
Quarter-finals
Besut United	2
Gemuda	0
Markless ST	3
Delima Warriors	0
PBSMT	2
Hulu Fighters	1
Real Chukai	1
Kerteh F.C.	5

Semi-finals
Besut United	0
Markless ST	3
PBSMT	1
Kerteh F.C.	2

Final
Markless ST	0 (3)
Kerteh F.C.	0 (4)

=== Quarter-final ===
3 January 2020
15:45 UTC+8

Markless ST	3 − 0	Delima Warriors

Padang A, Kompleks Sukan Gong Badak, Kuala Terengganu
3 January 2020
21:00 UTC+8

Real Chukai	1 − 5	Kerteh F.C.

Mak Chilli Stadium, Kemaman
10 January 2020
15:45 UTC+8

Besut United	2 − 0	Gemuda

Padang A, Kompleks Sukan Gong Badak, Kuala Terengganu
10 January 2020
15:45 UTC+8

PBSMT	2 − 1	Hulu Fighters

Padang B, Kompleks Sukan Gong Badak, Kuala Terengganu

=== Semi-final ===
17 January 2020
15:45 UTC+8

Besut United	0 − 3	Markless ST

Sultan Ismail Nasiruddin Shah Stadium, Kuala Terengganu
19 January 2020
21:00 UTC+8

PBSMT	1−2 (a.e.t.)	Kerteh F.C.

Sultan Ismail Nasiruddin Shah Stadium, Kuala Terengganu

=== Final ===
7 February 2020
21:00 UTC+8

Markless ST	0 − 0 (a.e.t.)	Kerteh F.C.
Penalties
	3 – 4

Sultan Ismail Nasiruddin Shah Stadium, Kuala Terengganu

== Awards ==
=== Top Scorer ===
Name	Club	Goals
Mohd Izzul Fadhli Mohd Fauzi	Kerteh F.C.	10
