= Terengganu FC =

Malaysian association football club

Terengganu
- Full name: Terengganu Football Club
- Nicknames: Sang Penyu (The Turtles); Hitam Putih (The Black and White)
- Short name: TEG
- Founded: 22 November 1956; 69 years ago, as Terengganu FA; 21 November 2017; 8 years ago, as Terengganu
- Ground: Sultan Mizan Zainal Abidin Stadium
- Capacity: 50,000
- Owner: Terengganu Football Club Sdn. Bhd
- President: Hishamuddin Abdul Karim
- Head coach: Nafuzi Zain
- League: Malaysia Super League
- 2025–26: Malaysia Super League, 5th of 13
- Website: terengganufc.com
Home colours	Away colours

Terengganu Football Club (Malay: Kelab Bola Sepak Terengganu) is a professional football club based in Kuala Nerus, Terengganu, Malaysia, that competes in the Malaysia Super League, the first division of the Malaysian football league system.

The club had won major trophies in Malaysian football. Domestically they had won 1 Malaysia Cup, 2 Malaysia FA Cup, 1 Malaysia Charity Shield, 2 Malaysia Premier League titles and 1 FAM League title. Terengganu remains the only state team that has not won the top-flight league since the introduction of the league in 1982 up until now.

Terengganu has a long-standing rivalry with fellow east coast club Kelantan, with matches between the two sides known as the East Coast Derby. The rivalry is regarded as one of the notable coastal football rivalries in Malaysia, reflecting the geographical proximity and footballing traditions of the two neighbouring states.

== History ==
=== Early years (1956–1988) ===
On 22 November 1956, the club was founded as the Terengganu Football Association. Terengganu FA did not have much success in the 1970s with only a single appearance in the Malaysia Cup final led by Harun Jusoh, losing to Selangor 2–1 in a match played at the Merdeka Stadium.

=== Promotion and league struggles (1989–1997) ===
It was the same in the 1980s with another final appearance in 1982, ironically also against Selangor. It was the same outcome with Selangor winning 1–0 after extra-time. When the semi-professional League was introduced in 1989, Terengganu were in the second division based on their final position in the previous season.

Terengganu then later recruited giant Dutch defender, Marlon van der Sander and Singaporean duo, Ahmad Paijan and Norhalis Shafik to boost their squad and finished the season in a credible fourth place but ultimately failed to win promotion.

In the 1990 season, they went all the way to emerge as the second-division champion under the guidance of head coach Abdullah Mohamed, with German striker Frank Pastor finding the back of the net on a regular basis, aided by midfield duo Martin Busse and Ahmad Paijan. They lost only once in the league all season to finish three points clear of their East Coast rival, Kelantan FA.

In the 1992 season, Terengganu recorded their highest ever finish in the league when they finished as runner-up to Pahang FA. The Elephants broke The Turtles hearts again in the semi-finals of the Malaysia Cup competition after neither side scored in 180 minutes of play, the match went into sudden-death extra-time.

For the next few seasons, Terengganu struggled and their lowest moment came in the 1997 season when they finished bottom of the table, resulting in them being in the second division when the Malaysian League changed into a two-tier competition again in 1998.

=== Malaysia Cup triumph and domestic success (1998–2013) ===
In the 1998 season, with Abdul Rahman Ibrahim at the helms, Terengganu emerged as the second division champion and went all the way to the final of the Malaysia Cup, the first one held at the newly opened Bukit Jalil National Stadium. Perak FA were the opponents and both teams entertained the 100,000 capacity crowd with exciting football. However both teams could not be separated after 120 minutes of play with the result stood at 1–1. The lottery of the penalty shootout was used to determine the winner and in the end it was third time unlucky for Terengganu in a Malaysia Cup final, losing the shootouts 5–3.

In 1999, Che Mat Jusoh, who was the Terengganu president at that time, was appointed to lead the club. He successfully guided the Terengganu to become champion in 2000 and 2011 season and runner-up in the 2004 season of the FA Cup. The team won first title in the Malaysia Cup in the 2001 season and runner-up in 2011 season. Terengganu won the Malaysia Charity Shield in the 2001 season. The team succeed to improve position in 2005–06 Malaysia Premier League season. The team ended in runner-up place during the season. In the 2010 season, Terengganu ended at third place in Malaysia Super League.

In 1999, Che Mat Jusoh, then chairman of the Football Association of Terengganu (TFA), was appointed to lead the club. Under his leadership, Terengganu won the Malaysia FA Cup in 2000 and the Malaysia Cup for the first time in 2001 and also claimed the Malaysian Charity Shield that year. The club subsequently reached the Malaysia FA Cup final in 2004, finishing as runners-up. Terengganu continued to improve in the following seasons, finishing as runners-up in the 2005–06 Premier League before securing third place in the Malaysia Super League in 2010. In 2011, the club won the Malaysia FA Cup for the second time and finished as runners-up in both the Malaysia Cup and the Malaysia Super League.

Under the guidance of head coach Irfan Bakti, Terengganu enjoyed a successful 2011 season, winning the Malaysia FA Cup for the second time while finishing as runners-up in both the Malaysia Cup and the Malaysia Super League. Their FA Cup triumph secured qualification for the 2012 AFC Cup, with Nordin Alias scoring the winning goal in extra time securing Terengganu to win the 2011 Malaysia FA Cup. While in the 2011 Malaysia Cup, Terengganu defeated rivals Kelantan in the quarter-finals before overcoming Selangor 4–1 on aggregate in the semi-finals, with Abdul Manaf Mamat scoring twice in the 2–0 first-leg victory. However, Terengganu's campaign ended in disappointment in the final at Shah Alam Stadium, where they took the lead through Ashari Samsudin in the 59th minute before S. Kunanlan equalised in the 81st minute. Hairuddin Omar then scored with a bicycle kick in the 86th minute to give Negeri Sembilan a 2–1 victory thus seeing Terengganu as the runner-ups. At the end of the season, head coach Irfan Bakti announced that he would leave Terengganu to manage another club for the following season.

==== AFC Cup debut (2012) ====
Terengganu made their debut in the 2012 AFC Cup after winning the 2011 Malaysia FA Cup. Drawn in Group F, they began their campaign with a 1–0 away victory over Vietnamese side Sông Lam Nghệ An on 6 March 2012. However, they subsequently lost 2–0 to Hong Kong club Kitchee and 2–0 to Singaporean club Tampines Rovers. Terengganu recovered with a 1–0 away win over Tampines Rovers and a convincing 6–2 victory against Sông Lam Nghệ An, before drawing 2–2 with Kitchee in their final group match. They finished second in Group F with 10 points, qualifying for the round of 16. However, their campaign ended on 23 May 2012 when they lost 3–2 to domestic rivals Kelantan in Kota Bharu.

=== Transition and rebranding (2014–2019) ===
At the end of the 2013 season, Che Mat Jusoh eventually withdrew from the presidency Terengganu after he failed to bring silverwares to the team as required by Terengganu fans. As Datuk Wan Ahmad Nizam take over Terengganu in 2014, he want to change Terengganu in the upcoming seasons to be a title contender in the Malaysia Super League.

In 2018, the club changed its name to Terengganu Football Club, Terengganu reached the final of the 2018 Malaysia Cup after beating Johor Darul Ta'zim in the semi-finals after 120 chaotic minutes, but lost to Perak 4–1 on penalties.

=== COVID-19 pandemic and league resurgence (2020–2022) ===
In the 2020 season, Terengganu performed well in the Malaysia Super League, finishing third in the standings. At least 30,000 spectators attended the club's opening league match against Perak at the Sultan Mizan Zainal Abidin Stadium, although Terengganu suffered a 3–1 defeat. The club subsequently recorded a 4–3 away victory over Kedah and a 3–3 draw against Selangor. However, the Malaysian Football League was suspended for 159 days because of the COVID-19 pandemic.

Terengganu returned to competitive action against Petaling Jaya City at the Petaling Jaya Stadium, securing a 2–0 victory. The club concluded its league campaign with a 2–1 win over Pahang, confirming its third-place finish in the standings. In the 2020 Malaysia Cup, Terengganu defeated Petaling Jaya City 1–0 to advance to the quarter-finals, where they were scheduled to face Perak. The proposed encounter was particularly notable as Perak had eliminated Terengganu from the 2018 Malaysia Cup following a penalty shoot-out in the final, which ended 3–3 after extra time. However, the 2020 competition was cancelled after the Malaysian government's rejection of the Malaysian Football League's appeal to proceed with the tournament amid the COVID-19 pandemic in Malaysia.

Due to the COVID-19 pandemic in Malaysia, the 2020 Malaysia FA Cup was cancelled and declared null and void by the Football Association of Malaysia which originally would see the champion gaining the slot for the 2021 AFC Cup group stage so it were determined only by the results of the 2020 Malaysia Super League in which Terengganu finished in the third place in the league that season. By finishing in the third place, Terengganu will automatically gain a slot in the 2021 AFC Cup which see them being placed in Group I with Visakha, Lalenok United and Geylang International but backed out from the tournament later on.

=== Recent seasons (2023–present) ===
On 8 October 2023, Hishamuddin Abdul Karim was appointed president of the Terengganu Football Association, succeeding Ahmad Samsuri Mokhtar. In his role, Hishamuddin also served as chairman of the board of directors of Terengganu Football Club Sdn. Bhd., overseeing the club's administration and management.

Terengganu qualified for the group stage of the 2023–24 AFC Cup as runners-up of the 2022 Malaysia Super League. Drawn in Group G alongside Indonesian club Bali United, Australian club Central Coast Mariners and Philippine club Stallion Laguna, Terengganu began their campaign on 20 September 2023 with a 1–0 notable home victory over Central Coast Mariners gaining media attention for their win against the Australian club who then went on to win the AFC Cup. An own goal by Nathan Paull late in the first half secured the win, marking a strong start against the eventual champions of the competition. Terengganu subsequently drew 1–1 away to Bali United on 4 October, with Syahmi Zamri scoring the equaliser in the 84th minute after the hosts had taken the lead. Terengganu then drew 1–1 away to Central Coast Mariners on 29 November, maintaining their unbeaten record against the Australian side. In their final group match on 13 December, Terengganu defeated Bali United 2–0 at the Sultan Mizan Zainal Abidin Stadium. The victory secured second place in Group G with 12 points from six matches, comprising three wins and three draws. However, despite finishing unbeaten, Terengganu had to wait for the conclusion of the other ASEAN Zone groups to determine whether they would qualify as one of the best-placed group runners-up. However, Terengganu ultimately missed out on qualification for the knockout stage, as Phnom Penh Crown finished as the best-placed runners-up in the ASEAN Zone, ahead of Terengganu on goal difference

Terengganu then participate in the recently revived tournament, the 2024–25 ASEAN Club Championship being placed alongside Indonesian club PSM Makassar, Vietnamese club Đông Á Thanh Hóa, Thailand club BG Pathum United, Cambodian club Preah Khan Reach Svay Rieng and Myanmar Shan United. Despite recording a 5–0 away victory over Shan United and a 1–0 home win against PSM Makassar, Terengganu finished fourth in the group with seven points from five matches, missing out on qualification for the semi-finals.

== Team image ==
=== Club licensing regulations ===
==== 2018 season ====
- This club had obtained the FAM Club License to play in the 2018 Malaysia Super League season.

==== 2019 season ====
- This club had obtained the FAM Club License to play in the 2019 Malaysia Super League season.
- This club had obtained the AFC Club License and is eligible to play either 2019 AFC Champions League or 2019 AFC Cup if qualified on merit.

==== 2020 season ====
- Terengganu Football Club is now a professional football club managed by a corporate company. Ab Rasid Jusoh was appointed as the CEO meanwhile Mohd Sabri Abas was appointed as the COO of Terengganu Football Club Sdn.Bhd

=== Rivalries ===
Terengganu had a long-standing rivalry with Kelantan, the two east coast clubs involved in what is known as the East Coast Derby, starting in the mid-1980s. The only time the East Coast derby was ever contested with a title in stake was in the 2011 Malaysia FA Cup final, which saw Terengganu winning the match 2–1.

== Stadium ==
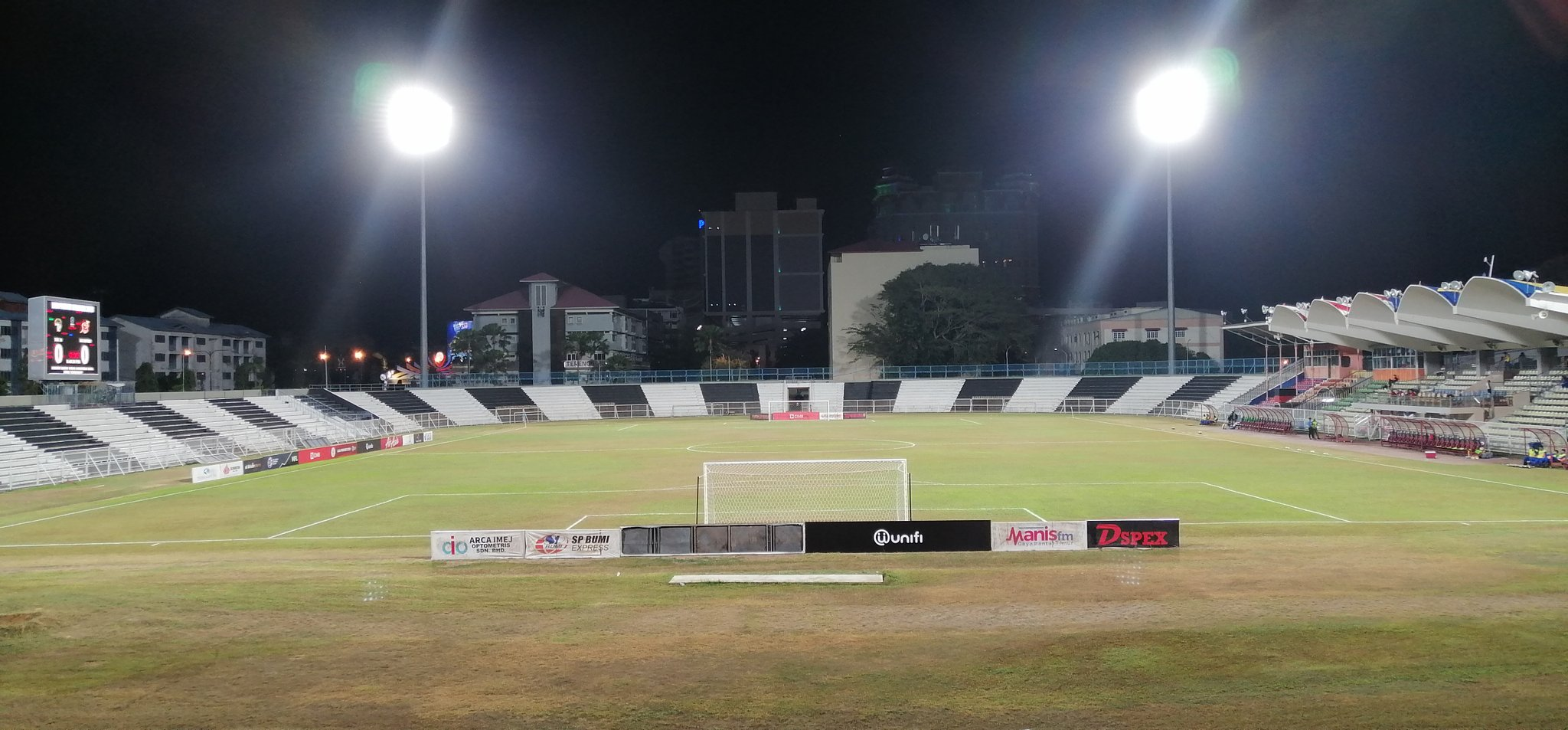
Sultan Ismail Nasiruddin Shah Stadium – former stadium

=== Former stadium ===
Previously, Terengganu used the compact Sultan Ismail Nasiruddin Shah Stadium as their home venue since the stadium was completed in the late 1960s and serves as the home ground of Terengganu II, a feeder team of Terengganu.

For the 2018 Malaysia Super League season, Terengganu will use the Sultan Ismail Nasiruddin Shah Stadium as their home venue as the Sultan Mizan Zainal Abidin Stadium is being renovated once again to improve the quality of the stadium's pitch.

=== Current stadium ===
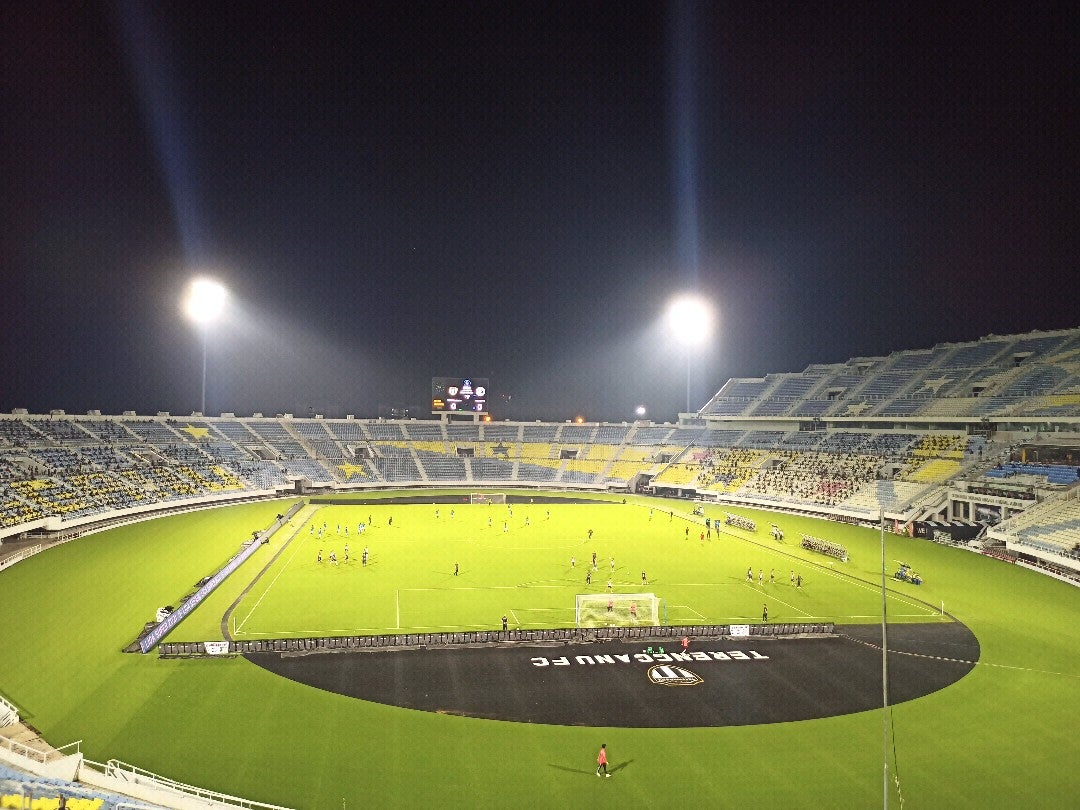
Sultan Mizan Zainal Abidin Stadium – current stadium

Terengganu main home ground is currently the Sultan Mizan Zainal Abidin Stadium.

The stadium holds 50,000 seating capacity and is named after the reigning Terengganu Ruler, Sultan Mizan Zainal Abidin. It is the biggest stadium in the East Coast region of Peninsular Malaysia and it was built to replace Sultan Ismail Nasiruddin Shah Stadium as the state's main stadium. Sultan Mizan Zainal Abidin Stadium was built when Terengganu was awarded the right to host the Sukma Games 2008 and was completed in April that year. Sultan Mizan Zainal Abidin himself, who was then the 13th Yang Di-Pertuan Agong officiated the stadium on 10 May 2008.

Terengganu began using the stadium as their home venue in July 2008 with Melaka having the honour of being the first opponent of The Turtles for the match played on 15 July 2008.

==== First collapse of the roof ====
However, the roof structure of the stadium collapsed on 2 June 2009 forcing Terengganu to move back to the Sultan Ismail Nasiruddin Shah Stadium, which at the time was in process of being torn down. The upper sections which expanded the original capacity of the stadium to 20,000 spectators had been taken down and the pitch was in a bad state due to the heavy vehicles being driven on it.

Due to the urgent state of affairs at that time, the stadium was quickly fixed and was restored to meet the minimum requirement of the Football Association of Malaysia (FAM) and Terengganu were spared from playing the home matches somewhere else but with a reduced capacity of just 15,000.

Further upgrades were installed at the stadium in 2012 when Terengganu qualified for the 2012 AFC Cup tournament after winning the 2011 Malaysia FA Cup the previous season.

In May 2015, the Sultan Mizan Zainal Abidin Stadium was given the green light by FAM to hold competitive matches again after their competition committee members were satisfied with the repairs and upgrades carried out at the stadium which Terengganu returned to the Sultan Mizan Zainal Abidin Stadium but Terengganu II decided to stay at the Sultan Ismail Nasiruddin Shah Stadium.

==== Crowd trouble ====
However, the first match played there after the re-opening ended with crowd trouble after Terengganu fans rioted after Terengganu were knocked out of the semi-finals of the 2015 Malaysia FA Cup by the LionsXII on Away goals rules due to their dissatisfaction with match officials decisions. Terengganu were fined by FAM and were ordered to play two matches without any spectators.

The original capacity of the stadium was 51,000 but due to safety reasons the upper tier of the main stand is closed thus reducing the capacity of the stadium to just 35,000 spectators at any one time.

== Kit suppliers and shirt sponsors ==
Period	Kit manufacturer	Shirt sponsor (chest)
1978	(England) Umbro	No sponsors
1979	(Italy) Admiral	No sponsors
1980–1981	(Germany) Adidas	No sponsors
1982–1983	(Germany) Schwarzenbach	No sponsors
1984–1985	(Italy) Lotto	No sponsors
1986	(Argentina) Topper	No sponsors
1987–1988	(Germany) Puma	Dunhill
1989–1992	(Germany) Puma	Dunhill; EON Bank
1993	(Germany) Adidas	Dunhill; EON Bank
1994–1996	(Germany) Adidas	Dunhill
1997	(New Zealand) Line 7	Dunhill
1998–2002	(Japan) Mizuno	Dunhill
2003	(Italy) Lotto	Dunhill
2004	(Italy) Mizuno	Dunhill
2005	(Italy) Lotto	TMNet; Inai Kiara
2005–2006	(Italy) Pronic	celcom Inai Kiara
2006–2010	(Italy) Pronic	TM
2011–2012	(Indonesia) Specs	Top-IT
2013	(Indonesia) Specs	Desa Murni Batik; Zon Ria
2014	(England) Umbro	Desa Murni Batik; Zon Ria
2015	(England) Umbro	Ladang Rakyat
2016	(Malaysia) Kobert	Terengganu Inc.
2017	(Malaysia) Kobert	Chicken Cottage
2018	(Malaysia) Kobert	Chicken Cottage
2019	(Malaysia) AL Sports	Terengganu Inc.
2020	(Malaysia) AL Sports	redONE
2021	(Malaysia) AL Sports	redONE
2022–2023	(Malaysia) Umbro	Colever
2024-25	(Malaysia) ALX	Agarbomb Performance
2025–2026	(Malaysia) ALX	Terengganu Inc.
2026–present	(Malaysia) Trivet	

At the beginning of 2013, a local textile company called Desa Murni Batik agreed to sponsor Terengganu for a year worth RM400,000 and it was the biggest investment the company had ever made.

AL became the club's apparel sponsor from 2019 to 2021.

In 2022, Umbro Malaysia through Al Ikhsan once again agreed to be the official sponsor and supplier of Terengganu kits for the 2022 and 2023 seasons with a sponsorship value of RM1.8 million and this is the biggest value the brand has ever offered to a club in Malaysia at this time. The last time Umbro sponsored Terengganu was in the 2014 and 2015 seasons.

On 18 January 2022, TDC Holdings Sdn Bhd signed a two-year contract as the main sponsor for the 2022 and 2023 seasons and became the new platinum sponsor for Terengganu replacing Yakult Malaysia and redONE. They agreed to give RM4 million in cash and RM500,000 in goods making a total of RM4.5 million for the two seasons.

== Players ==
=== First-team squad ===
As of 18 September 2026

Note: Flags indicate national team as defined under FIFA eligibility rules; some limited exceptions apply. Players may hold more than one non-FIFA nationality.

No.	Pos.	Nation	Player
1	GK	MAS	Rahadiazli Rahalim
3	DF	MAS	Ubaidullah Shamsul
4	DF	CMR	Ngweni Ndassi
5	DF	MAS	Shahrul Nizam (captain)
6	MF	MAS	Faiz Mazlan
7	FW	BDI	Elvis Kamsoba
8	MF	PHI	Manny Ott
9	FW	CUW	Gervane Kastaneer
10	FW	ESP	Víctor Ruiz
11	FW	BRA	Mateus Gustavo
14	MF	MAS	Haziq Kutty Abba
15	DF	MAS	Faris Rifqi
18	FW	MAS	G. Pavithran
19	FW	MAS	Romel Morales (on loan from Johor Darul Ta'zim)

No.	Pos.	Nation	Player
20	MF	BHR	Habib Haroon
21	MF	MAS	Danial Amier (on loan from Johor Darul Ta'zim)
23	DF	MAS	Azam Azmi (on loan from Johor Darul Ta'zim)
24	DF	MAS	Safwan Mazlan
25	DF	MAS	Alif Zakaria
29	GK	MAS	Syed Nasrulhaq
38	GK	MAS	Suhaimi Husin
44	DF	SEN	Pape Diakite
55	DF	MAS	Zachary Zahidadil
66	MF	MAS	Danial Mohd Nor
82	FW	MAS	Jordan Mintah
88	MF	MAS	Nik Sharif Haseefy

== Management and staff ==
=== Management ===
Position	Name
President	(Malaysia) Hishamuddin Abdul Karim
Deputy-president	
Chief executive officer	Mohd Syahrizan (Interim)
Chief operating officer	
Chief marketing officer	Dzuli Kram Arpin
Secretary	
IT manager	Dzul Arman Shah
Business & PR manager	Muhammad

=== Technical staff ===
Position	Name
Team Manager	(Malaysia) Zul Fadli Rozi
Head Coach	(Malaysia) Nafuzi Zain
Assistant head coach	(Malaysia) Tengku Hazman
Goalkeeping coach	(Malaysia) Mohd Yazid Mohd Yasin
Fitness coach	(Malaysia) Efindy Salleh
Team Doctor	(Malaysia) Mohd Shahrul Faiz Mohd Noor
Physiotherapist	(Malaysia) Zulkifli Mohd Zin
Masseur	(Malaysia) Shukri Zakaria
Team Admin	(Malaysia) Syed Ahmad Rahimi Syed Mohd Abduil Wahab
Team Security	(Malaysia) ASP Mahathir Muhammad
Team Media	(Malaysia) Muhammad Syazwan Mohd Ghazali
Team Analyst	(Malaysia) Amirul Mustaqim
Kitman	(Malaysia) Rosdi Talib
Kitman	(Malaysia) Ismail A. Rahman
Kitman	(Malaysia) Ismail Faruqi Ashari
Kitman	(Malaysia) Mohamad Fakhruddin

== Honours ==
Type	Competition	Titles	Seasons
League	Semi-Pro League Division 2/Liga Perdana 2 (Second division)	2	1990, 1998
League	Malaysia FAM Cup (Third division)	1	2001
Cup	Malaysia Cup	1	2001
Cup	Malaysia FA Cup	2	2000, 2011
Cup	Malaysia Charity Shield	1	2001
Others	Sheikh Kamal International Club Cup	1	2019

Bold is for those competition that are currently active.

=== AFC competitions ===
- AFC Cup
  - Round of 16 (1): 2012
  - Group Stage (2): 2023

=== Pre-season competitions ===
- Terengganu Chief Minister's Cup
  - Winners (1): 2018

== Award winners ==
=== Domestic ===
- League Golden Boot
  - (Malaysia) Ashari Samsudin (2010)
  - (Malaysia) Abdul Hadi Yahya (2011)
  - (Liberia) Francis Doe (2012)
- Coach of the Season
  - (Malaysia) Irfan Bakti (2011)
  - (Malaysia) Nafuzi Zain (2022)
- Best Goalkeeper of the Season
  - (Malaysia) Syamsuri Mustafa (2005–06)
- Best Defender of the Season
  - (Malaysia) Azam Azmi (2023)
- Best Striker of the Season
  - (Malaysia) Nor Farhan Muhammad (2014)
- Best Young Player of the Season
  - (Malaysia) Nor Farhan Muhammad (2005–06)
- Team of the Season
  - (Malaysia) Lee Tuck (2019)
  - (Malaysia) Arif Fadzilah (2021)
  - (Malaysia) Azam Azmi (2023)
  - (Malaysia) Shahrul Nizam (2023)

=== Continental ===
==== ASEAN Club Championship ====
- Team of the Tournament
  - (Malaysia) Safawi Rasid (2024–25)

=== Others ===
- Fair Play Award
  - 2014, 2023, 2024–25
- Most Popular Player
  - (Malaysia) Lee Tuck (2018)

== Notable players ==
As of 2026–27 season.

=== International capped players ===
AFC/OFC.: (Australia) Chris Herd; (Australia) Mario Karlović; (Cambodia) Thierry Bin; (Lebanon) Hassan Chaito; (Myanmar) Kyaw Min Oo; (Philippines) Carli de Murga; (Philippines) Luke Woodland; (Philippines) Manny Ott; (Philippines) Omid Nazari; (Singapore) Faris Ramli; (South Korea) Do Dong-hyun; (Tajikistan) Ehson Panjshanbe; (Tajikistan) Shervoni Mabatshoyev; (Thailand) Adisak Kraisorn; (Uzbekistan) Lutfulla Turaev; (Uzbekistan) Nurillo Tukhtasinov; (Uzbekistan) Sanjar Shaakhmedov	CAF.: (Burundi) Elvis Kamsoba; (Cameroon) Effa Owona; (Cameroon) Ngweni Ndassi; (Cameroon) Vincent Bikana; (Republic of the Congo) Yann Mabella; (Liberia) Francis Doe; (Mauritania) Dominique Da Sylva; (Namibia) Petrus Shitembi	UEFA.: (Croatia) Domagoj Pušić; (Montenegro) Argzim Redžović; (Montenegro) Bogdan Milić; (Montenegro) Igor Zonjić; (Netherlands) Matthew Steenvoorden	CONMEBOL/ CONCACAF.: (Brazil) Lázaro Vinícius; (Canada) Issey Nakajima-Farran; (Curaçao) Gervane Kastaneer; (El Salvador) Nelson Bonilla; (Haiti) Sony Nordé

== Managerial history ==
Name	Period	Achievements
(Malaysia) Abdullah Mohammad	Unknown	
(Malaysia) Tajuddin Nor	Unknown	
(Malaysia) Abdul Rahman Ibrahim	1983–1984	
(Bosnia and Herzegovina) Marco Bilić	1993	
(Malaysia) Abdul Rahman Ibrahim (2)	1998	
(Malaysia) Yunus Alif	1998–2000	– 2000 Malaysia FA Cup
(Malaysia) Mat Zan Mat Aris	2001–2002	– 2001 Malaysia Cup – 2001 Charity Shield
Unknown	2003–2004	
(Malaysia) Yunus Alif (2)	2005–2008	
(Malaysia) Che Ku Marzuki	2008–2009	
(England) Ken Worden	2009	
(Malaysia) Irfan Bakti	2010–2011	– 2011 Malaysia FA Cup
(Malaysia) Mat Zan Mat Aris	2012	
(England) Peter Butler	2012	
(Malaysia) E. Elavarasan	2013	
(Malaysia) Abdul Rahman Ibrahim (3)	2014	
(Malaysia) Ahmad Yusof	2015–2016	
(Malaysia) Che Ku Marzuki (2)	2016–2017	
(England) Mike Mulvey (caretaker)	2017	
(Malaysia) Irfan Bakti (2)	2017–2019	
(Malaysia) Nafuzi Zain	2019–2022	
(Croatia) Tomislav Steinbrückner	2022–2024	
(Malaysia) Badrul Afzan	2024–2025	
(Malaysia) Tengku Hazman (interim)	2025–2026	
(Malaysia) Nafuzi Zain (2)	2026–present	

== Season by season record ==
Updated on 18 December 2023.

Note:

- Pld = Played, W = Won, D = Drawn, L = Lost, F = Goals for, A = Goals against, Pts= Points, Pos = Position

1st or Champions 2nd or Runner-up 3rd place Promotion Relegation

Season	League									Cup			Asia		Top Goalscorer	
Season	Division	Pld	W	D	L	F	A	Pts	Pos	Charity	Malaysia	FA	Competition	Result	Player	Goals
1952	Eastern Zone	2	1	1	0	5	4	4	1st	—	Semi-final	—	—	—		
1953	League East Zone	1	0	0	1	2	5	0	3rd	—	Not qualified	—	—	—		
1954	League East Zone	2	1	0	1	6	4	2	1st	—	Playoff SF	—	—	—		
1955	League East Zone	2	1	0	1	5	4	2	2nd	—	Not qualified	—	—	—		
1956	League East Zone	2	0	0	2	2	6	0	3rd	—	Not qualified	—	—	—		
1957	League East Zone	2	1	0	1	4	7	2	2nd	—	Not qualified	—	—	—		
1958	League East Zone	2	0	0	2	1	8	0	3rd	—	Not qualified	—	—	—		
1959	League East Zone	4	0	0	4	1	25	0	3rd	—	Not qualified	—	—	—		
1960	League East Zone	4	0	0	4	2	16	0	3rd	—	Not qualified	—	—	—		
1961	League East Zone	4	0	1	3	5	18	1	3rd	—	Not qualified	—	—	—		
1962	League East Zone	4	1	0	3	5	8	2	2nd	—	Not qualified	—	—	—		
1963	League North Zone	12	2	1	9	11	57	5	6th	—	Not qualified	—	—	—		
1964										—		—	—	—		
1965	League East Zone	4	2	0	2	11	16	4	2nd	—	Not qualified	—	—	—		
1966	League East Zone	4	3	1	0	10	6	7	1st	—	Semi-final	—	—	—		
1967	League East Zone	4	2	2	0	10	5	6	1st	—	Semi-final	—	—	—		
1968	League East Zone	4	2	1	1	10	9	5	2nd	—	Not qualified	—	—	—		
1969	League East Zone	4	3	0	1	14	5	6	2nd	—	Semi-final	—	—	—		
1970	League East Zone	6	2	3	1	15	9	7	2nd	—	Not qualified	—	—	—		
1971	League East Zone	6	1	1	4	8	12	3	3rd	—	Not qualified	—	—	—		
1972	League East Zone	4	2	1	1	11	4	5	1st	—	Semi-final	—	—	—		
1973	League South Zone								2nd	—	Runner-up	—	—	—		
1974	League South Zone	10	4	3	3	15	11	11	4th	—	Not qualified	—	—	—		
1975	League South Zone	10	2	4	4	9	18	8	5th	—	Not qualified	—	—	—		
1976	League South Zone									—	Not qualified	—	—	—		
1977	League South Zone	10	5	2	3	21	11	12	2nd	—	Semi-final	—	—	—		
1978	League South Zone	10	4	4	2	18	9	12	3rd	—	Not qualified	—	—	—		
1979	League	15	7	3	5	28	20	17	7th	—	Not qualified	—	—	—		
1980	League	15	5	5	5	20	19	15	9th	—	Not qualified	—	—	—		
1981	League	16	6	5	5	15	22	17	9th	—	Not qualified	—	—	—		
1982	Malaysian League									—	Runner-up	—	—	—		
1983	Malaysian League	15				24	27	10	14th	—	Not qualified	—	—	—		
1984	Malaysian League	15	4	5	6	20	21	17	11th	—	Not qualified	—	—	—		
1985	Malaysian League	15	9	2	4	29	17	29	4th	—	Semi-final	—	—	—		
1986	Malaysian League	15	7	4	4	17	12	25	6th	—	Quarter-final	—	—	—		
1987	Malaysian League	16	9	4	3	27	13	31	5th	—	Quarter-final	—	—	—		
1988	Malaysian League	16	6	5	5	18	21	23	10th	—	Not qualified	—	—	—		
1989	Semi-Pro League 2	14	5	7	2	26	14	22	4th	—	Not qualified	—	—	—		
1990	Semi-Pro League 2	14	10	3	1	16	16	23	1st	—	Group stage	1st round	—	—		
1991	Semi-Pro League 1	18	8	2	8	17	20	18	6th	—	Group stage	1st round	—	—		
1992	Semi-Pro League 1	18	8	5	5	24	23	21	2nd	—	Semi-final	Semi-final	—	—	(Slovakia) Marian Valach	8
1993	Semi-Pro League 1	18	3	5	10	19	36	14	8th	—	Not qualified	1st round	—	—		
1994	Premier League	28	12	7	9	46	42	43	7th	—	Group stage		—	—	(Malaysia) Ariffin Osman	18
1995	Premier League	28	12	3	13	43	53	39	8th	—	Group stage		—	—	(Nigeria) Edward Dipreye	12
1996	Premier League	28	4	8	16	16	55	20	13th	—	Not qualified		—	—		
1997	Premier League	28	6	4	18	26	55	22	15th	—	Not qualified	Semi-final	—	—		
1998	Premier 2	14	9	3	2	32	12	30	1st	—	Runner-up	1st round	—	—		
1999	Premier 1	18	4	7	7	15	19	23	8th	—	Semi-final	Runner-up	—	—		
2000	Premier 1	22	8	10	4	36	22	34	4th	—	Group stage	Champions	—	—		
2001	Premier 1	22	12	5	5	37	20	41	2nd	Champions	Champions	2nd round	—	—		
2002	Premier 1	26	12	5	9	36	24	41	5th	Runner-up	Group stage	Quarter-final	—	—	(Malaysia) Sapian Wahid	13
2003	Premier 1	24	4	3	17	24	52	15	13th	—	Not qualified	2nd round	—	—	(Malaysia) Tengku Adam Rosli	8
2004	Premier League	24	8	11	5	33	27	35	5th	—	Not qualified	Runner-up	—	—	(Togo) Alfa Fotowabawi (Brazil) Jurandir Dos Santos	13
2005	Premier League	21	13	4	4	34	18	43	2nd	—	Semi-final	Quarter-final	—	—	(Brazil) Jurandir Dos Santos	10
2005–06	Premier League	21	12	5	4	47	21	41	2nd	—	Quarter-final	Quarter-final	—	—		
2006–07	Super League	24	13	5	6	41	29	44	4th	—	Semi-final	Round of 32	—	—		
2007–08	Super League	24	10	7	7	41	31	37	6th	—	Semi-final	Semi-final	—	—	(Brazil) Gleisson Freire	11
2009	Super League	26	15	2	9	46	29	47	5th	—	Semi-final	Round of 16	—	—	(Malaysia) Ashari Samsudin	22
2010	Super League	26	16	5	5	54	24	53	3rd	—	Semi-final	Quarter-final	—	—		
2011	Super League	26	16	5	5	54	26	53	2nd	—	Runner-up	Champions	—	—	(Malaysia) Abdul Hadi Yahya	24
2012	Super League	26	11	8	7	41	33	41	5th	—	Group stage	Semi-final	AFC Cup	Round of 16	(Liberia) Francis Forkey Doe	21
2013	Super League	22	7	6	9	25	31	27	9th	—	Group stage	Semi-final	—	—	(Cameroon) Effa Owona	14
2014	Super League	22	10	6	6	38	28	36	4th	—	Quarter-final	Round of 32	—	—	(Malaysia) Nor Farhan	8
2015	Super League	22	12	2	8	40	33	38	4th	—	Group stage	Semi-final	—	—	(Brazil) Paulo Rangel	16
2016	Super League	22	5	4	13	21	44	19	12th	—	Group stage	2nd round	—	—	(Canada) Issey Nakajima	7
2017	Premier League	22	15	2	5	42	27	47	2nd	—	Group stage	Semi-final	—	—	(Ivory Coast) Kipré Tchétché	12
2018	Super League	22	10	4	8	32	31	34	5th	—	Runner-up	3rd round	—	—	(Ivory Coast) Kipré Tchétché	24
2019	Super League	22	7	9	6	35	37	30	7th	—	Quarter-finals	Quarter-final	—	—	(Ivory Coast) Kipré Tchétché	14
2020	Super League	11	6	1	4	24	14	18	3rd	—	Cancelled	Cancelled	—	—	(Mauritania) Dominique Da Sylva	9
2021	Super League	22	10	6	6	33	20	38	4th	—	Semi-final	Cancelled	AFC Cup	ASEAN Zone Cancelled	(Brazil) David da Silva	7
2022	Super League	22	14	2	6	39	20	44	2nd	—	Semi-final	Runner-up	—	—	(Ivory Coast) Kipré Tchétché	13
2023	Super League	26	11	7	8	45	34	40	6th	Runner-up	Runner-up	Semi-final	AFC Cup	Group Stage	(Croatia) Ivan Mamut	11
2024–25	Super League	24	9	8	7	35	26	35	5th	—	Semi-final	Semi-final	ASEAN Club Championship	Group stage	(Malaysia) Safawi Rasid	18
2025–26	Super League	24	10	6	8	39	34	36	5th	—	Quarter-final	Quarter-final	—	—	(Brazil) Careca	8

== Performance in AFC club competitions ==
Season	Competition	Round	Opponent	Home	Away	Aggregate
2012	AFC Cup	Group F	(Vietnam) Song Lam Nghe An	6–2	1–0	2nd out of 4
2012	AFC Cup	Group F	(Hong Kong) Kitchee	0–2	2–2	2nd out of 4
2012	AFC Cup	Group F	(Singapore) Tampines Rovers	0–2	1–0	2nd out of 4
2012	AFC Cup	Round of 16	(Malaysia) Kelantan	2–3		
2021	AFC Cup	Group I	Cancelled			
2023–24	AFC Cup	Group G	(Australia) Central Coast Mariners	1–0	1–1	2nd out of 4
2023–24	AFC Cup	Group G	(Indonesia) Bali United	2–0	1–1	2nd out of 4
2023–24	AFC Cup	Group G	(Philippines) Stallion Laguna	2–2	3–2	2nd out of 4

== Performance in AFF club competitions ==
Season	Competition	Round	Opponent	Home	Away	Aggregate
2024–25	ASEAN Club Championship	Group A	(Cambodia) Preah Khan Reach Svay Rieng	2–3	—N/a	4th out of 6
2024–25	ASEAN Club Championship	Group A	(Vietnam) Dong A Thanh Hoa	2–2	—N/a	4th out of 6
2024–25	ASEAN Club Championship	Group A	(Myanmar) Shan United	—N/a	5–0	4th out of 6
2024–25	ASEAN Club Championship	Group A	(Indonesia) PSM Makassar	1–0	—N/a	4th out of 6
2024–25	ASEAN Club Championship	Group A	(Thailand) BG Pathum United	—N/a	3–4	4th out of 6

== See also ==
- Terengganu II
- SATU F.C.
