= 2009 Johor F.C. season =

Johor FC
2009 season
- Owner: Johor Corporation
- Manager: Mohd Faizal Abdullah
- Head Coach: Ramlan Rasid
- Stadium: Pasir Gudang Stadium
- Super League: 4th
- FA Cup: First round
- Malaysia Cup: Quarter-finals
- AFC Cup: Group stage
- Top goalscorer: League: Azwan Roya (8); All: Azwan Roya (11)
- Biggest win: 5–0 vs Penang (A), 16 June 2009, Super League
- Biggest defeat: 1–4 vs South China AA (H), 21 April 2009, AFC Cup
Home colours	Away colours

The 2009 season was Johor Football Club's 37th season in club history, their 3rd season in the Malaysia Super League since its rebranding in 2004, and their 5th in the Malaysian first division.

Johor FC competed in the 2009 Malaysia Super League, 2009 Malaysia FA Cup, 2009 Malaysia Cup and 2009 AFC Cup. In the Super League, they finished fourth with 48 points from 26 matches. In the FA Cup, they were eliminated by Penang FA in the quarter-finals. In the Malaysia Cup, they reached the quarter-finals before losing to Perlis FA 4–1 on aggregate. In the AFC Cup, Johor FC finished bottom of their group with one point from six matches.

== Season overview ==

Johor FC's usual starting lineup in the 2009 season

The 2009 season was a solid one for Johor FC, as the club finished fourth in the Malaysia Super League, reached the quarter-finals of the Malaysia Cup, and competed in the AFC Cup for the first time in the club's history.

=== Super League ===
Johor FC enjoyed a solid Malaysia Super League campaign, finishing fourth with 48 points from 26 matches, recording 15 wins, 3 draws, and 8 defeats, with 53 goals scored and 27 conceded for a goal difference of +26. The campaign ran from 3 January to 3 August, with Johor FC finishing behind champions Selangor, Perlis, and Kedah. Notable results included a 5–1 win over Kedah and a 3–0 win over Perak, though defeats to Negeri Sembilan and Selangor proved costly in the title race.

=== FA Cup ===
In the Malaysia FA Cup, Johor FC's campaign ended in the second round. After progressing through the first round, Johor FC were drawn against Penang and drew the second leg 0–0 at home, but a 1–0 defeat in the first leg meant they exited 0–1 on aggregate. The early exit meant Johor FC's only realistic chance of silverware that season rested on the Malaysia Cup and their continental campaign.

=== Malaysia Cup ===
The Malaysia Cup was the highlight of Johor FC's season, as the team topped Group C with 4 wins, 1 draw, and 1 defeat from 6 matches, scoring 14 goals and conceding 6 for a goal difference of +8. Notable group results included a 4–1 win over UPB-MyTeam and a 4–0 win over Kuala Lumpur, with Mohd Farid Ideris and Nurul Azwan Roya among the goals. However, their cup run ended in the quarter-finals, as they were defeated 1–4 on aggregate by Perlis, losing the second leg 0–2 away after a 1–2 home defeat.

=== AFC Cup ===
Johor FC made their debut in the AFC Cup, having qualified as the 2007–08 Malaysia Super League third place. Drawn into a group alongside Hong Kong side South China, Indonesian club PSMS Medan, and Maldivian side VB Sports, Johor FC struggled throughout the group stage. They opened with a 0–0 draw against VB Sports at the Pasir Gudang Corporation Stadium on 10 March, but suffered heavy defeats to PSMS Medan (3–1 away, 0–1 home) and South China (0–2 away, 1–4 home). Johor FC finished bottom of the group with just 1 point from 6 matches, scoring 2 goals and conceding 12 for a goal difference of −10, and were eliminated at the group stage.

== Player Information ==
=== Full Squad ===
No.	Name	Age	Nat.	Position	Join	Signed From	D.O.B
Goalkeepers
22	Anis Faron	27	(Malaysia)	GK	2008	(Malaysia) Selangor	9 November 1982
23	G. Jeevananthan	29	(Malaysia)	GK	2008	(Malaysia) Sabah	13 Mar 1980
Defenders
6	M. Sivakumar	26	(Malaysia)	CB / DM	2006	(Malaysia) Youth systems	6 March 1984
5	Sumardi Hajalan	25	(Malaysia)	CB / CM	2006	(Malaysia) Sabah	12 Jan. 1985
4	Abdul Halim Omar	-	(Malaysia)	CB	2009	(Malaysia) Youth systems	-
2	Wan Rohaimi	34	(Malaysia)	CB	2006	(Malaysia) Selangor	19 May 1976
11	Khairi Kiman	26	(Malaysia)	CB	2004	(Malaysia) Youth systems	3 March 1984
3	Hamzani Omar	32	(Malaysia)	CB	2007	(Malaysia) Johor FA	30 Sep 1978
26	Farid Ramli	22	(Malaysia)	LB	2006	(Malaysia) Youth systems	28 April 1987
Midfielders
15	Riduwan Maon	28	(Malaysia)	CB / DM / CM	2006	(Malaysia) Youth systems	5 Oct. 1981
8	Azizan Baba	29	(Malaysia)	CM	2005	(Malaysia) Malacca United	9 Sept 1981
16	Saifuddin Riduan	29	(Malaysia)	CB / DM	2009	(Malaysia) Youth systems	5 March. 1981
9	Eddy Helmi	31	(Malaysia)	CM / AM	2001	(Malaysia) Youth systems	8 Dec. 1979
17	Azuwad Arip	26	(Malaysia)	DM	2005	(Malaysia) Youth systems	5 Oct. 1985
7	Ezaidy Khadar	28	(Malaysia)	AM / ST	2004	(Malaysia) Youth systems	17 Jan. 1983
20	Adam See	22	(Malaysia)	CM	2008	(Malaysia) Youth systems	3 June 1988
73	Azwan Roya	23	(Malaysia)	MF	2005	(Malaysia) Kelantan FA	25 June 1986
16	Christopher Mousa	20	(Malaysia)	MF	2009	(Malaysia) Johor FA	1 March 1989
Forwards
19	Syaiful Sabtu	26	(Malaysia)	ST	2005	(Malaysia) Youth systems	25 Oct. 1981
24	Wan Mohd Hoesne	24	(Malaysia)	ST / CF	2008	(Malaysia) Youth systems	2 Sept 1987
18	Fahruzzahar Ali	26	(Malaysia)	ST	2005	(Malaysia) Youth systems	13 April 1984
31	Farid Ideris	28	(Malaysia)	CF	2009	(Malaysia) Johor FA	6 Apr. 1982
19	Rashid Aya	19	(Malaysia)	ST	2009	(Malaysia) Youth systems	4 June 1990

== Transfers ==
In

No.	Pos.	Name	Age	From
-	MF	(Malaysia) Christopher Mousa	20	(Malaysia) Johor FA

Out

No.	Pos.	Name	Age	To
–	DF	(Malaysia) Daudsu Jamaludin	24	(Malaysia) Kelantan
–	DF	(Cameroon) Moudourou Moise	24	(Thailand) Thai Port
–	RB	(Malaysia) Madzlan Emoi	35	(Malaysia) Sabah
–	FW	(Argentina) Gustavo Fuentes	36	(Argentina) San Miguel
–	FW	(Argentina) Walter Ariel Silva	28	(Argentina) Unión de Mar del Plata

== Competitions ==
=== Overview ===
Competition	First match	Last match	Starting round	Final position	Record							
Competition	First match	Last match	Starting round	Final position	Pld	W	D	L	GF	GA	GD	Win %
Malaysia Super League	3 January 2009	1 August 2009	Matchday 1	4th	26	15	3	8	53	27	+26	57.69
Malaysia FA Cup	24 January 2009	3 February 2009	First round	First round	2	0	1	1	0	1	−1	0.00
Malaysia Cup	26 September 2009	24 October 2009	Group stage	Quarter-finals	8	4	1	3	15	10	+5	50.00
AFC Cup	10 March 2009	19 May 2009	Group stage	Group stage	6	0	1	5	2	12	−10	0.00
Total					42	19	6	17	70	50	+20	45.24

Last updated: 22 October 2026
Source: Competitions

=== Malaysia Super League ===
==== Matches ====
Win Draw Loss

3 January 2009 1	Pahang	2 – 3	Johor FC	Kuantan, Pahang
	14' Hasmizan Kamarodin; 46' Azamuddin Md Akil		62' M. Sivakumar; 76' Mohd Riduwan Ma'on; 88' Mohd Riduwan Ma'on	Stadium: Stadium Darul Makmur

6 January 2009 2	Johor FC	2 – 2	Penang	Pasir Gudang, Johor
	16' Mohd Nurul Azwan Roya; 52' Hamzani Omar		31' Mohd Irme Mat; 45' Mohd Irme Mat	Stadium: Stadium JCorp

10 January 2009 3	Kedah	0 – 0	Johor FC	Alor Setar, Kedah
				Stadium: Stadium Darul Aman

13 January 2009 4	Johor FC	2 – 1	Selangor	Pasir Gudang, Johor
	20' Eddy Helmi Manan; 71' Hamzani Omar		10' (pen.) Safee Sali	Stadium: Stadium JCorp

10 February 2009 5	Negeri Sembilan	3 – 0	Johor FC	Paroi, Negeri Sembilan
	4' Shahurain Abu Samah; 46' S. Kunalan; 66' Shahurain Abu Samah			Stadium: Stadium Tuanku Abdul Rahman

14 February 2009 6	Johor FC	0 – 1	Perak	Pasir Gudang, Johor
			39' Razali Umar Kandasamy	Stadium: Stadium JCorp

17 February 2009 7	Johor FC	1 – 2	Perlis	Pasir Gudang, Johor
	57' Mohd Syaifol Sabtu		1' (pen.) Ahmad Fakri Sharani; 7' Mohd Firdaus Faudzi	Stadium: Stadium JCorp

28 February 2009 8	Johor FC	0 – 1	Kuala Muda	Pasir Gudang, Johor
			12' K. Rajan	Stadium: Stadium JCorp

21 March 2009 9	PLUS	0 – 1	Johor FC	Cheras, Kuala Lumpur
				Stadium: Stadium Bolasepak Kuala Lumpur

31 March 2009 10	PDRM	1 – 2	Johor FC	Paroi, Negeri Sembilan
	37' Eddy Gapil		57' Mohd Ezaidy Mohd Khadar; 65' Mohd Ezaidy Mohd Khadar	Stadium: Stadium Tuanku Abdul Rahman

4 April 2009 11	Johor FC	1 – 0	UPB–MyTeam	Pasir Gudang, Johor
	52' Eddy Helmi Manan			Stadium: Stadium JCorp

11 April 2009 12	Kuala Muda	2 – 1	Johor FC	Alor Setar, Kedah
	63' K. Rajan; 71' Akmal Rizal Ahmad Rakhli		82' Mohd Ezaidy Mohd Khadar	Stadium: Stadium Darul Aman

28 April 2009 13	Johor FC	4 – 0	PDRM	Pasir Gudang, Johor
	36' Wan Rohaimi Hassan; 46' Mohd Syaifol Sabtu; 81' Mohd Nurul Azwan Roya; 89' Mohd Nurul Azwan Roya			Stadium: Stadium JCorp

12 May 2009 14	Kelantan	1 – 2	Johor FC	Kota Bharu, Kelantan
	23' Mohd Nizab Ayob		38' Azizan Baba; 58' Azizan Baba	Stadium: Stadium Sultan Mohamad Ke-IV

16 May 2009 15	Johor FC	3 – 0	Terengganu	Pasir Gudang, Johor
	60' Eddy Helmi Manan; 76' Mohd Nurul Azwan Roya; 80' Mohd Syaiful Sabtu			Stadium: Stadium JCorp

23 May 2009 16	Johor FC	4 – 0	Pahang	Pasir Gudang, Johor
	23' Mohd Saifuddin Riduan; 29' Eddy Helmi Manan; 39' Wan Rohaimi Wan Ismail; 51' Mohd Nurul Azwan Roya			Stadium: Stadium JCorp

26 May 2009 17	Terengganu	3 – 2	Johor FC	Kuala Terengganu, Terengganu
	32' Mohd Ashaari Shamsuddin; 56' Mohd Ashaari Shamsuddin; 90' Mohd Ashaari Shamsuddin		36' Eddy Helmi Manan; 68' Azizan Baba	Stadium: Stadium Sultan Mizan Zainal Abidin

16 June 2009 18	Penang	0 – 5	Johor FC	George Town, Penang
			18' Sumardi Hajalan; 67' Mohd Ezaidy Mohd Khadar; 71' Muhd Safuan Ridwan; 76' Mohd Nurul Azwan Roya; 81' Mohd Syaiful Sabtu	Stadium: Stadium Bandaraya

23 June 2009 19	Selangor	4 – 1	Johor FC	Shah Alam, Selangor
	12' M. Sivakumar; 48' Mohd Syafuan Riduwan; 67' R. Surendran; 69' R. Surendran		41' (pen.) Eddy Helmi Manan	Stadium: Stadium Shah Alam

27 June 2009 20	Johor FC	3 – 0	Negeri Sembilan	Pasir Gudang, Johor
	8' Eddy Helmi Manan; 42' Mohd Farid Ideris; 57' Eddy Helmi Manan			Stadium: Stadium JCorp

30 June 2009 21	Perak	0 – 3	Johor FC	Ipoh, Perak
			3' Mohd Azizan Baba; 52' Mohd Nurul Azwan Roya; 90' Mohd Ezaidy Mohd Khadar	Stadium: Stadium Perak

4 July 2009 22	Perlis	1 – 0	Johor FC	Kangar, Perlis
	65' Azi Shahril Azmi			Stadium: Stadium Utama Negeri

7 July 2009 23	Johor FC	1 – 1	PLUS	Pasir Gudang, Johor
	90' Abdul Halim Omar		10' Rusydee Samsuddin	Stadium: Stadium JCorp

11 July 2009 24	Johor FC	5 – 1	Kedah	Pasir Gudang, Johor
	4' Eddy Helmi Manan; 30' Mohd Nurul Azwan Roya; 43' Wan Rohaimi Wan Ismail; 48' Mohd Farid Ideris; 82' Muhd Safuan Ridwan		69' Shafiq Jamal	Stadium: Stadium JCorp

21 July 2009 25	UPB–MyTeam	0 – 5	Johor FC	Kelana Jaya, Selangor
			15' Mohd Azizan Baba; 44' Mohd Hamzani Omar; 45' Mohd Nurul Azwan Roya; 47' Mohd Syaiful Sabtu; 62' Mohd Farid Ideris	Stadium: Stadium MBPJ

1 August 2009 26	Johor FC	2 – 1	Kelantan	Pasir Gudang, Johor
				Stadium: Stadium JCorp

==== League table ====
Pos	Team	Pld	W	D	L	GF	GA	GD	Pts
2	Perlis	26	17	5	4	40	19	+21	56
3	Kedah	26	16	3	7	45	28	+17	51
4	Johor FC	26	15	3	8	53	27	+26	48
5	Terengganu	26	15	2	9	46	29	+17	47
6	Kelantan	26	14	2	10	49	36	+13	44

Source: Results TM Liga Super and Rec.Sport.Soccer Statistics Foundation

=== Malaysia FA Cup ===
==== First round ====
Win Draw Loss

24 January 2009 1st leg	Penang	1 – 0	Johor FC	George Town, Penang
	25' Farkhis Pisol			Stadium: Stadium Bandaraya

3 February 2009 2nd leg	Johor FC	0 – 0 (0–1 agg.)	Penang	Pasir Gudang, Johor
				Stadium: Stadium JCorp

=== Malaysia Cup ===
==== Group stage ====
Pos	Team	Pld	W	D	L	GF	GA	GD	Pts
1	Johor FC (Q)	6	4	1	1	14	6	+8	13
2	Perak	6	3	2	1	11	4	+7	11
3	Kuala Lumpur	6	1	2	3	3	9	−6	5
4	MyTeam	6	1	1	4	7	16	−9	4

(Q) Qualified to quarterfinals

26 September 2009 1	Kuala Lumpur	0 – 1	Johor FC	Cheras, Kuala Lumpur
			48' Farid Idris	Stadium: Stadium Bolasepak Kuala Lumpur

29 September 2009 2	Johor FC	4 – 1	UPB-MyTeam	Pasir Gudang, Johor
	Farid Ideris 43'; Nurul Azwan Roya 47'; Sumardi Hajalan 70'; Farid Ideris 41'		34' Zamri Chin	Stadium: Stadium JCorp

2 October 2009 3	Johor FC	0 – 2	Perak	Pasir Gudang, Johor
			19'Razali Umar Kandasamy; 43' Noor Hazrul Mustafa	Stadium: Stadium JCorp

6 October 2009 4	Johor FC	4 – 0	Kuala Lumpur	Pasir Gudang, Johor
	Azizan Baba 22'; Nurul Azwan Roya 33'; Nurul Azwan Roya 37'; Nurul Azwan Roya 52' (pen.)			Stadium: Stadium JCorp

10 October 2009 5	UPB-MyTeam	2 – 4	Johor FC	Kelana Jaya, Selangor
	Norshahrul Idlan Taaha 61'; Stanley Bernand 90'		30' Safuan Ridwan; 46' Eddy Helmi; 76' Ezaidy Khadar; 89' Riduwan Maon	Stadium: Stadium MBPJ

13 October 2009 6	Perak	1 – 1	Johor FC	Ipoh, Perak
	Saufi Sa'aidi 72'		45' Farid Ideris

==== Quarter-finals ====
20 October 2009 1st leg	Johor FC	1 – 2	Perlis	Pasir Gudang, Johor
	Ezaidy Khadar 88'		40' K. Soley; 66' Ahmad Fakri	Stadium: Stadium JCorp

24 October 2009 2nd leg	Perlis	2 – 0 (4–1 agg.)	Johor FC	Kangar, Perlis
	Amar Rohidan 8'; Nizaruddin Yusof 48'			Stadium: Stadium Utama Negeri

=== AFC Cup ===
==== Group Stage ====
Team	Pld	W	D	L	GF	GA	GD	Pts	SC	MED	VB	JFC
(Hong Kong) South China	6	5	1	0	15	5	+10	16		3–0	2–1	2–0
(Indonesia) PSMS Medan	6	4	1	1	9	7	+2	13	2–2		1–0	3–1
(Maldives) VB	6	1	1	4	5	7	−2	4	1–2	1–2		2–0
(Malaysia) Johor FC	6	0	1	5	2	12	−10	1	1–4	0–1	0–0	

Legend: Blue = home team win; Yellow = draw; Red = away team win.

10 March 2009 1	Johor FC (Malaysia)	0 – 0	(Maldives) VB Sports Club	Pasir Gudang, Johor
20:45 UTC+8				Stadium: Pasir Gudang Corporation Stadium; Attendance: 350; Referee: (South Korea) Choi Myung-Yong

17 March 2009 2	PSMS Medan (Indonesia)	3 – 1	(Malaysia) Johor FC	Palembang, Indonesia
19:00 UTC+7	53' Elie Aiboy; 55' Zada; 65' Elie Aiboy		21' Azuwad	Stadium: Jakabaring Stadium; Attendance: 1,500; Referee: (Sri Lanka) Hettikamkanamge Perera

7 April 2009 3	South China AA (Hong Kong)	2 – 0	(Malaysia) Johor FC	Hong Kong
20:00 UTC+8	15' Man Pei Tak; 55' Cacá			Stadium: Mong Kok Stadium; Attendance: 3,791; Referee: (Myanmar) Win Cho

21 April 2009 4	Johor FC (Malaysia)	1 – 4	(Hong Kong) South China AA	Pasir Gudang, Johor
17:00 UTC+8	51' Eddy Helmi Manan		29' Cacá; 47' Schutz; 66' Chan Chi Hong; 90' Cacá	Stadium: Pasir Gudang Corporation Stadium; Attendance: 500; Referee: (China) Huang Junjie

5 May 2009 5	VB Sports Club (Maldives)	2 – 0	(Malaysia) Johor FC	Malé, Maldives
16:00 UTC+5	20' Mansaray; 39' Hussain			Stadium: National Stadium; Attendance: 2,187; Referee: (Vietnam) Vo Minh Tri

19 May 2009 6	Johor FC (Malaysia)	0 – 1	(Indonesia) PSMS Medan	Pasir Gudang, Johor
20:45 UTC+8			67' Leonardo	Stadium: Pasir Gudang Corporation Stadium; Attendance: 100; Referee: (Iraq) Alaa Al-Abadee

== Club statistics ==
Includes all competitive matches. The list is sorted by shirt number when total goals are equal.

As of match played 5 October 2013

Rank	Pos.	No.	Player	Super League	FA Cup	Malaysia Cup	AFC Cup	Total
1	FW	73	(Malaysia) Azwan Roya	8	0	3	0	11
2	FW	29	(Malaysia) Farid Ideris	4	0	4	0	8
3	MF	8	(Malaysia) Azizan Baba	6	0	1	0	7
4	MF	7	(Malaysia) Ezaidy Khadar	5	0	2	0	7
5	DF	3	(Malaysia) Hamzani Omar	3	0	0	0	3
6	MF	16	(Malaysia) Saifuddin Riduan	2	0	1	0	3
7	MF	15	(Malaysia) Riduwan Maon	2	0	1	0	3
8	DF	2	(Malaysia) Wan Rohaimi	2	0	0	0	2
9	DF	5	(Malaysia) Sumardi Hajalan	1	0	1	0	2
10	MF	9	(Malaysia) Eddy Helmi	0	0	1	1	2
11	DF	6	(Malaysia) M. Sivakumar	1	0	0	0	1
10	MF	17	(Malaysia) Azuwad Arip	0	0	0	1	1
Own Goals				2	0	0	0	2
TOTALS				40	0	14	2	56
