= 2010 Johor F.C. season =

Johor FC
2010 season
- Owner: Johor Corporation
- Manager: Mohd Faizal Abdullah
- Head Coach: Ramlan Rasid
- Stadium: Pasir Gudang Stadium
- Super League: 4th
- FA Cup: First round
- Malaysia Cup: Semi-finals
- Top goalscorer: League: Azwan Roya (7); All: Azwan Roya (8)
- Biggest win: 5–0 vs Penang (A), 13 March 2010, Super League
- Biggest defeat: 1–4 vs Kelantan (A), 23 January 2010, Super League
Home colours	Away colours	Third colours

The 2010 season was Johor Football Club's 38th season in club history, their 4th season in the Malaysia Super League since its rebranding in 2004, and their 6th in the Malaysian first division.

Johor FC qualified to the Malaysia FA Cup quarterfinals with their coach Ramlan Rashid. They failed to advance further after being defeated by Negeri Sembilan FA. Johor FC ended their Malaysia Cup campaign in the semi-finals, where they notably drew 2–2 against Negeri Sembilan FA in the first leg but were defeated 5–7 on aggregate after a high-scoring second-leg loss.

== Season overview ==

Johor FC's usual lineup in the 2010 season

The 2010 season was a strong one for Johor FC, as the club finished fourth in the Malaysia Super League and reached the semi-finals of the Malaysia Cup, although they were unable to secure silverware in either competition.

=== Super League ===
Johor FC competed in the seventh edition of the Malaysia Super League, which had been established in 2004 following the rebranding of Liga Perdana 1. The team enjoyed a solid league campaign, finishing fourth with 43 points from 26 matches, recording 13 wins, 4 draws, and 9 defeats, with 44 goals scored and 29 conceded for a goal difference of +15. Their league campaign ran from January to August 2010, and the fourth-place finish placed them behind champions Selangor, Kelantan, and Terengganu. Notable results included a 5–0 home win over Penang and a 3–0 win over Kedah, though a heavy 6–0 away defeat to eventual champions Selangor in January was a low point.

=== FA Cup ===
In the Malaysia FA Cup, Johor FC's campaign was brief and ended in disappointment. After progressing through the early rounds, they faced Negeri Sembilan and drew the first leg 2–2 at home. However, they suffered a heavy 3–5 defeat in the second leg away, exiting the competition 5–7 on aggregate. The early exit meant Johor FC's only realistic chance of silverware that season rested on the Malaysia Cup.

=== Malaysia Cup ===
The Malaysia Cup was the highlight of Johor FC's season, as the team went unbeaten through the group stage. Placed in Group C, Johor FC recorded three wins and three draws from six matches, scoring 7 goals and conceding 3, topping the group with 12 points and a +4 goal difference. Notable group results included a 1–0 win over Pahang and a 2–1 win over ATM FA. In the semi-finals, Johor FC took a 1–0 lead away against Negeri Sembilan in the first leg, but a 0–2 home defeat in the second leg ended their run 1–2 on aggregate, denying them a place in the final.

== Player Information ==
No.	Name	Age	Nat.	Position	Join	Signed From	D.O.B
Goalkeepers
21	Fazli Paat	22	(Malaysia)	GK	2010	(Malaysia) Youth systems	27 November 1987
22	Anis Faron	28	(Malaysia)	GK	2008	(Malaysia) Selangor	9 November 1982
23	G. Jeevananthan	30	(Malaysia)	GK	2008	(Malaysia) Sabah FA	13 Mar 1980
Defenders
6	Izuan Jarudin	25	(Malaysia)	CB	2010	(Malaysia) Kedah	4 July 1985
14	Rizal Roslan	27	(Malaysia)	RB	2010	(Malaysia) Youth systems	14 Mac 1983
2	Mat Saiful Mohamad	30	(Malaysia)	CB	2010	(Malaysia) Kuala Muda	1983
5	Sumardi Hajalan	25	(Malaysia)	CB / CM	2006	(Malaysia) Sabah	12 Jan. 1985
2	Wan Rohaimi	34	(Malaysia)	CB	2006	(Malaysia) Selangor	19 May 1976
11	Khairi Kiman	26	(Malaysia)	CB	2004	(Malaysia) Youth systems	3 March 1984
3	Hamzani Omar	32	(Malaysia)	CB	2007	(Malaysia) Johor FA	30 Sep 1978
5	Radzi Razman	21	(Malaysia)	CB	2010	(Malaysia) Johor FA	14 July 1989
Midfielders
23	Zulhissyam Jamaluddin	29	(Malaysia)	CM	2010	(Malaysia) Kuala Muda	22 July 1981
8	Azizan Baba	29	(Malaysia)	CM	2005	(Malaysia) Melaka	9 Sept 1981
25	Khairul Ismail	29	(Malaysia)	DM	2010	(Malaysia) Kedah	11 Dec. 1981
9	Eddy Helmi	31	(Malaysia)	CM / AM	2001	(Malaysia) Youth systems	8 Dec. 1979
20	Irme Mat	29	(Malaysia)	AM / CM	2010	(Malaysia) Penang	19 November 1981
73	Azwan Roya	24	(Malaysia)	MF	2005	(Malaysia) Kelantan FA	25 June 1986
15	Riduwan Maon	29	(Malaysia)	CM	2006	(Malaysia) Youth systems	5 Oct. 1981
16	Saifuddin Riduan	29	(Malaysia)	CB / DM	2009	(Malaysia) Youth systems	5 March. 1981
17	Azuwad Arip	25	(Malaysia)	DM	2005	(Malaysia) Youth systems	5 Oct. 1985
7	Ezaidy Khadar	28	(Malaysia)	AM / ST	2004	(Malaysia) Youth systems	17 Jan. 1983
Forwards
33	Saufi Ibrahim	27	(Malaysia)	ST	2010	(Malaysia) Kelantan	27 January 1983
19	Syaiful Sabtu	29	(Malaysia)	ST	2005	(Malaysia) Negeri Sembilan	25 Sept. 1981
24	Wan Mohd Hoesne	24	(Malaysia)	ST / CF	2008	(Malaysia) Selangor	2 Sept 1987
18	Farid Ideris	28	(Malaysia)	CF	2009	(Malaysia) Johor FA	6 Apr. 1982
19	Rashid Aya	20	(Malaysia)	ST	2009	(Malaysia) Youth systems	4 June 1990

== Transfers ==
In

No.	Pos.	Name	Age	From
6	DF	(Malaysia) Izuan Jarudin	27	(Malaysia) Kedah
2	DF	(Malaysia) Mat Saiful Mohamad	30	(Malaysia) Kuala Muda Naza
23	MF	(Malaysia) Zulhissyam Jamaluddin	29	(Malaysia) Kuala Muda Naza
25	MF	(Malaysia) Khairul Ismail	29	(Malaysia) Kedah
20	MF	(Malaysia) Irme Mat	29	(Malaysia) Penang
33	FW	(Malaysia) Saufi Ibrahim	27	(Malaysia) Kelantan

Out

No.	Pos.	Name	Age	To
-	FW	(Malaysia) Fahruzzahar Ali	-	(Malaysia) Kuala Lumpur
-	FW	(Malaysia) See Kok Luen	-	(Malaysia) Kuala Lumpur
-	DF	(Malaysia) Farid Ramli	-	(Malaysia) Kuala Lumpur
-	DF	(Malaysia) M. Sivakumar	-	(Malaysia) Sabah FA
-	CM	(Malaysia) Christopher Mousa	-	(Malaysia) Johor FA

== Competition ==
=== Overview ===
Competition	First match	Last match	Starting round	Final position	Record							
Competition	First match	Last match	Starting round	Final position	Pld	W	D	L	GF	GA	GD	Win %
Malaysia Super League	9 January 2010	3 August 2010	Matchday 1	4th	26	13	4	9	44	29	+15	50.00
Malaysia FA Cup	2 February 2010	6 February 2010	First round	First round	2	0	1	1	5	7	−2	0.00
Malaysia Cup	14 September 2010	23 October 2010	Group stage	Semi-finals	6	3	3	0	10	7	+3	50.00
Total					34	16	8	10	59	43	+16	47.06

Last updated: 28 September 2010
Source: Competitions

=== Malaysia Super League ===
==== Matches ====
Win Draw Loss

9 January 2010 1	Perlis	0 – 1	Johor FC	Kangar, Perlis
			61' Mohd Riduwan Ma'on	Stadium: Stadium Utama Negeri

13 January 2010 2	Johor FC	1 – 1	Negeri Sembilan	Pasir Gudang, Johor
	75' Wan Rohaimi Wan Ismail		83' Norizam Salaman	Stadium: Stadium JCorp

16 January 2010 3	Kedah	0 – 1	Johor FC	Alor Setar, Kedah
			90' Mohammad Khairul Ismail	Stadium: Darul Aman Stadium

19 January 2010 4	Johor FC	0 – 1	Kuala Lumpur	Pasir Gudang, Johor
			18' Yong Kuong Yong	Stadium: Stadium JCorp

23 January 2010 5	Kelantan	4 – 1	Johor FC	Kota Bharu, Kelantan
	18' Norshahrul Idlan Talaha; 46' Azizi Matt Rose; 50' Indra Putra Mahayuddin; 72' Mohd Nor Farhan Mohammad		21' Mohd Riduwan Ma'on	Stadium: Sultan Muhammad IV Stadium

30 January 2010 6	Perak	0 – 3	Johor FC	Ipoh, Perak
			41' Mohammad Khairul Ismail; 60' Zulhissyam Jamaluddin; 88' Eddy Helmi Abd Manan	Stadium: Perak Stadium

9 February 2010 7	Johor FC	1 – 0	PLUS	Pasir Gudang, Johor
				Stadium: Stadium JCorp

6 March 2010 8	Johor FC	2 – 1	Pahang	Pasir Gudang, Johor
	62' Mohd Irme Mat; 66' Wan Rohaimi Wan Ismail		76' R. Karhigesu	Stadium: Stadium JCorp

13 March 2010 9	Penang	0 – 5	Johor FC	Batu Kawan, Penang
			45' Mohd Izuan Jarudin; 51' Mohd Nurul Azwan Roya; 61' Mohd Nurul Azwan Roya; 74' Zulhissyam Jamaluddin; 90' Mohd Safuan Ibrahim	Stadium: Stadium Negeri

17 April 2010 10	Johor FC	2 – 0	Terengganu	Pasir Gudang, Johor
	86' (pen.) Eddy Helmi Abd Manan; 88' Mohd Izuan Jarudin			Stadium: Stadium JCorp

20 April 2010 11	T-Team	1 – 0	Johor FC	Kuala Terengganu, Terengganu
	42' Abdul Hadi Yahya			Stadium: Sultan Ismail Nasiruddin Shah Stadium

24 April 2010 12	Johor FC	3 – 0	Johor FA	Pasir Gudang, Johor
	36' Mohd Irme Mat; 67' Mohd Azizan Baba; 74' Mohd Izuan Jarudin			Stadium: Stadium JCorp

4 May 2010 13	Johor FC	1 – 3	Selangor	Pasir Gudang, Johor
	90' Mohd Nurul Azwan Roya		41' Mohd Amirulhadi Zainal; 73' Mohd Amirulhadi Zainal; 86' Mohd Hardi Jaafar	Stadium: Stadium JCorp

7 May 2010 14	Selangor	4 – 1	Johor FC	Shah Alam, Selangor
	30' Safee Sali; 40' Liew Kit Kong; 80' R. Surendren; 85' Mohd Amirulhadi Zainal		87' Mohd Irme Mat	Stadium: Shah Alam Stadium

15 May 2010 15	Johor FC	2 – 1	Perlis	Pasir Gudang, Johor
	25' Mohammad Khairul Ismail; 29' Mohd Ezaidi Mohd Khadar		7' Ahmad Fakri Saarani	Stadium: Stadium JCorp

18 May 2010 16	Negeri Sembilan	2 – 1	Johor FC	Paroi, Negeri Sembilan
	4' Shahurain Abu Samah; 21' Shahurain Abu Samah		62' Mohd Ezaidi Mohd Khadar	Stadium: Tuanku Abdul Rahman Stadium

21 May 2010 17	Johor FC	1 – 2	Kedah	Pasir Gudang, Johor
	87' Mohd Azuwad Mohd Arip		7' (o.g.) Mohd Hamzani Omar; 63' Khyril Muhymeen Zambri	Stadium: Stadium JCorp

25 May 2010 18	Kuala Lumpur	0 – 0	Johor FC	Kuala Lumpur
				Stadium: Stadium Cheras

29 May 2010 19	Johor FC	1 – 0	Perak	Pasir Gudang, Johor
	82' Mohammad Khairul Ismail			Stadium: Stadium JCorp

1 June 2010 20	PLUS	1 – 1	Johor FC	Kelana Jaya, Selangor
	58' Rusydee Samsuddin		22' Mohd Safuan Ibrahim	Stadium: Stadium MBPJ

6 July 2010 21	Terengganu	0 – 3	Johor FC	Kuala Terengganu, Terengganu
				Stadium: Sultan Ismail Nasiruddin Shah Stadium

10 July 2010 22	Johor FC	5 – 0	Penang	Pasir Gudang, Johor
	Wan Rohaimi Wan Ismail; Mohammad Ezaidy Mohammad Khadar; Khairi Kiman; Mohd Nurul Azwan Roya; Mohd Nurul Azwan Roya			Stadium: Stadium JCorp

17 July 2010 23	Johor FC	2 – 2	T-Team	Pasir Gudang, Johor
	15' Mohd Nurul Azwan Roya; 72' Mohd Nurul Azwan Roya		61' Shamsul Kamal Mohamad; Norfazly Alias	Stadium: Stadium JCorp

28 July 2010 24	Johor FA	0 – 5	Johor FC	Larkin, Johor
				Stadium: Stadium Tan Sri Hj Hassan Yunos

31 July 2010 25	Johor FC	1 – 3	Kelantan	Pasir Gudang, Johor
	35' Mohd Nurul Azwan Roya		6' (pen.) Indra Putra Mahayuddin; 22' Akmal Rizal Rakhli; 83' Indra Putra Mahayuddin	Stadium: Stadium JCorp

3 August 2010 26	Pahang	3 – 0	Johor FC	Kuantan, Pahang
	Mohd Shahrizan Mohd Salleh; R. Surendran; Azamuddin Mohd Akil			Stadium: Darul Makmur Stadium

==== League table ====
Pos	Team	Pld	W	D	L	GF	GA	GD	Pts
2	Kelantan	26	17	8	1	50	14	+36	59
3	Terengganu	26	15	5	6	51	27	+24	50
4	Johor FC	26	13	4	9	44	29	+15	43
5	Kedah	26	10	8	8	34	23	+11	38
6	Negeri Sembilan	26	11	5	10	40	31	+9	38

Source: Results TM Liga Super
Rules for classification: 1) points; 2) goal difference; 3) number of goals scored.

=== Malaysia FA Cup ===
==== First round ====
Win Draw Loss

2 February 2010 1st leg	Johor FC	2 – 2	Negeri Sembilan	Pasir Gudang, Johor
	6' Azwan Roya; 67' Eddy Helmi		15' Shukor Adan; 73' Zaquan Adha	Stadium: Stadium JCorp

6 February 2010 2nd leg	Negeri Sembilan	5 – 3 (7–5 agg.)	Johor FC	Paroi, Negeri Sembilan
	51' Zaquan Adha; 54' S. Kunalan; 60' K. Thanaraj; 79' Asyraf Al-Japri; 91' Asyraf Al-Japri		66' Eddy Helmi; 74' Irme Mat; 80' Eddy Helmi	Stadium: Stadium Paroi

=== Malaysia Cup ===
==== Group stage ====
Pos	Team	Pld	W	D	L	GF	GA	GD	Pts
1	Johor FC (A)	6	3	3	0	7	3	+4	12
2	Kedah FA (A)	6	2	3	1	8	3	+5	9
3	Perak FA	6	2	1	3	4	7	−3	7
4	(Federal Territories of Malaysia) ATM FA	6	0	3	3	5	11	−6	3

(A) Advanced to knockout stage

14 September 2010 1	Johor FC	1 – 1	Kedah	Pasir Gudang, Johor
	52' Eddy Helmi		66' Badrol Bakhtiar	Stadium: Pasir Gudang Corporation Stadium

17 September 2010 2	ATM	1 – 1	Johor FC	Selayang, Selangor
	29' V. Saravanan		72' Hamzani Omar	Stadium: MPS Stadium Selayang

20 September 2010 3	Johor FC	2 – 0	Perak	Pasir Gudang, Johor
	36' Syaiful Sabtu; 60' Farid Ideris			Stadium: Pasir Gudang Corporation Stadium

3 October 2010 4	Kedah	0 – 0	Johor FC	Alor Setar, Kedah
				Stadium: Darul Aman Stadium

6 October 2010 5	Johor FC	2 – 1	ATM	Pasir Gudang, Johor
	25' Hamzani Omar; 66' Izuan Jarudin		72' V. Saravanan	Stadium: Pasir Gudang Corporation Stadium

9 October 2010 6	Perak	0 – 1	Johor FC	Ipoh, Perak
			47' Azizan Baba	Stadium: Perak Stadium

==== Quarter-finals ====
12 October 2010 1st leg	Johor FC	1 – 0	Pahang	Pasir Gudang, Johor
	60' Khairi Kiman			Stadium: Pasir Gudang Corporation Stadium

16 October 2010 2nd leg	Pahang	2 – 1 (2–2 agg.)	Johor FC	Kuantan, Pahang
	52' Eddy Helmi		65' Shahrizan Salleh; 68' Faizal Hussain	Stadium: Darul Makmur Stadium

==== Semi-finals ====
20 October 2010 1st leg	Negeri Sembilan	0 – 1	Johor FC	Paroi, Negeri Sembilan
			89' Ezaidy Khadar	Stadium: Tuanku Abdul Rahman Stadium

23 October 2010 2nd leg	Johor FC	0 – 2 (1–2 agg.)	Negeri Sembilan	Pasir Gudang, Johor
			36' Shukor Adan; 60' Shahurain Abu Samah	Stadium: Pasir Gudang Corporation Stadium

== Club statistics ==
Includes all competitive matches. The list is sorted by shirt number when total goals are equal.

As of match played 5 October 2013

Rank	Pos.	No.	Player	Super League	FA Cup	Malaysia Cup	Total
1	MF	73	(Malaysia) Azwan Roya	8	1	0	9
2	MF	9	(Malaysia) Eddy Helmi	2	3	2	7
3	MF	25	(Malaysia) Khairul Ismail	4	0	0	4
4	DF	6	(Malaysia) Izuan Jarudin	3	0	1	4
5	MF	7	(Malaysia) Ezaidy Khadar	3	0	1	4
6	MF	20	(Malaysia) Irme Mat	3	1	0	4
7	DF	2	(Malaysia) Wan Rohaimi	3	0	0	3
8	MF	23	(Malaysia) Zulhissyam Jamaluddin	2	0	0	2
9	MF	15	(Malaysia) Riduwan Maon	2	0	0	2
10	FW	33	(Malaysia) Saufi Ibrahim	2	0	0	2
11	MF	8	(Malaysia) Azizan Baba	1	0	1	2
12	DF	3	(Malaysia) Hamzani Omar	0	0	2	2
13	MF	17	(Malaysia) Azuwad Arip	1	0	0	1
14	DF	11	(Malaysia) Khairi Kiman	1	0	0	1
Own Goals				1	0	0	1
TOTALS				36	5	7	48
