= 2005–06 Johor F.C. season =

Johor FC
2005–06 season
- Owner: Johor Corporation
- Manager: Haji Tamyes Abdul Rahim
- Head Coach: Ramlan Rasid
- Stadium: Pasir Gudang Stadium
- Premier League: 3rd (promoted)
- FA Cup: First round
- Malaysia Cup: Group stage
- Top goalscorer: League: Gastón Conlon (13); All: Gastón Conlon (18)
- Biggest win: 5–2 vs PDRM (A), 8 January 2006, Premier League
- Biggest defeat: 1–4 vs Penang E&O (A), 24 July 2006, Malaysia Cup
| Home colours | Away colours | Third colours |

The 2005–06 season was Johor Football Club's 34th season in club history, their 3rd season in the Malaysia Premier League since its rebranding in 2004, and their 7th in the Malaysian second division.

Johor FC competed in the 2005–06 Malaysia Premier League, 2006 Malaysia FA Cup and 2006 Malaysia Cup. In the Premier League, they finished third in Group B with 35 points from 21 matches and qualified for the promotion/relegation playoffs. They were promoted to the 2006–07 Malaysia Super League after defeating Selangor PKNS 4–1 in the first leg and drawing 1–1 in the second leg of the playoff second round. In the FA Cup, they were eliminated by Terengganu in the first round. In the Malaysia Cup, they only reached the group stage after finishing fourth in Group B.

== Season overview ==
The 2005–06 season was a successful campaign for Johor FC, as they finished third in Group B of the 2005–06 Malaysia Premier League with 35 points from 21 matches and were promoted to the 2006–07 Malaysia Super League through the promotion/relegation playoffs. In the 2006 Malaysia Cup, they only reached the group stage after finishing in fourth place. In the 2006 Malaysia FA Cup, they were eliminated by Terengganu in the first round.

=== Premier League ===
Johor FC had a successful 2005–06 Malaysia Premier League campaign, finishing third in Group B with 35 points from 21 matches, recording 9 wins, 8 draws, and 4 defeats, with 38 goals scored and 27 conceded for a goal difference of +11. The campaign ran from December 2005 to June 2006, with Johor FC finishing behind Group B winners Sabah and runners-up Kuala Lumpur. Although Johor FC missed out on automatic promotion, which was reserved for the top two teams in each group, the club entered the promotion/relegation play-offs. In the play-offs, Johor FC defeated Selangor PKNS 4–1 in the first leg before drawing 1–1 in the second leg, securing promotion to the 2006–07 Malaysia Super League. Notable results included a 5–2 away win over PDRM, a 4–2 win over Kelantan TNB, a 4–1 win over Sabah, a 4–3 win over Kedah in the Malaysia Cup, and a 4–1 away win over Selangor PKNS in the promotion/relegation play-offs.

=== FA Cup ===
In the 2006 Malaysia FA Cup, Johor FC's campaign ended in the first round. They faced Terengganu, winning the first leg 3–2 away before losing the second leg 0–3 at home to be eliminated 3–5 on aggregate.

=== Malaysia Cup ===
The 2006 Malaysia Cup was Johor FC's final competition of the 2005–06 season. In the group stage, Johor FC finished fourth in Group B with four points from six matches, recording one win, one draw, and four defeats, with 12 goals scored and 18 conceded, missing out on qualification for the knockout stage behind group winners Melaka Telekom and runners-up Pulau Pinang E&O. Notable group-stage results included a 4–4 draw against Melaka Telekom and a 4–3 victory over Kedah. However, defeats to Pulau Pinang E&O, Melaka Telekom, and Kedah ended their campaign at the group stage. Perlis ultimately won the tournament, defeating Negeri Sembilan 2–1 in the final.

== Player Information ==
Note: Flags indicate national team as defined under FIFA eligibility rules; some limited exceptions apply. Players may hold more than one non-FIFA nationality.

| No. | Pos. | Nation | Player |
|---|---|---|---|
| 1 | GK | MAS | Kam Soon Hang |
| 2 | GK | MAS | Yusof Ishak |
| 4 | DF | MAS | Hamzani Omar |
| 7 | DF | ARG | Marcelo Cirelli |
| 17 | MF | MAS | M. Sivakumar |
| 9 | DF | MAS | Daudsu Jamaludin |
| 20 | MF | MAS | Ezaidy Khadar |
| 30 | FW | ARG | Gaston Marcel Conlon |
| 16 | MF | MAS | Khairul Naib |
| 33 | FW | MAS | Azwan Roya |
| 19 | MF | MAS | Azizan Baba |
| 35 | DF | MAS | Sumardi Hajalan |
| 31 | FW | MAS | Syaiful Sabtu |
| 10 | DF | MAS | Khairi Kiman |
| 5 | DF | MAS | Hasmawi Ismail |

| No. | Pos. | Nation | Player |
|---|---|---|---|
| 3 | GK | MAS | Fadly Hadi |
| 8 | DF | SEN | Racine Diouf |
| 15 | MF | MAS | Eddy Helmi |
| 25 | MF | ARG | Victor Rafael |
| 14 | DF | MAS | A. Ganeson |
| 26 | MF | MAS | Aiman Wong |
| 6 | DF | MAS | Khairun Haled |
| 11 | DF | MAS | Sulaiman Salim |
| 23 | MF | MAS | Azuwad Arip |
| 29 | FW | MAS | Faruzzhar Ali |
| 12 | DF | MAS | Redzuan Radzy |
| 24 | MF | MAS | Hairy Azly |
| 28 | MF | KOR | Kim Dong-hwan |
| 32 | FW | MAS | Fariq Yusof |
| 34 | DF | MAS | Fitri Omar |

== Competitions ==
=== Overview ===
| Competition | First match | Last match | Starting round | Final position | Record | | | | | | | |
| Competition | First match | Last match | Starting round | Final position | Pld | W | D | L | GF | GA | GD | Win % |
|---|---|---|---|---|---|---|---|---|---|---|---|---|
| Malaysia Premier League | 4 December 2005 | 28 June 2006 | Matchday 1 | 7th | 21 | 9 | 8 | 4 | 38 | 27 | +11 | 42.86 |
| Malaysia FA Cup | 8 February 2006 | 16 February 2006 | First round | First round | 2 | 1 | 0 | 1 | 3 | 5 | −2 | 50.00 |
| Malaysia Cup | 2 July 2006 | 29 July 2006 | Group stage | Group stage | 6 | 1 | 1 | 4 | 12 | 18 | −6 | 16.67 |
| Total | | | | | 29 | 11 | 9 | 9 | 53 | 50 | +3 | 37.93 |

Last updated: 28 October 2026
Source: Competitions

=== Premier League ===
==== Matches ====
Win Draw Loss

| 4 December 2005 1 | Johor FC | 3–3 | Melaka | Pasir Gudang, Johor |
| | 38', 73' Gastón Marcelo Conlón; 68' Juan Marcelo Correa | | 78', 82' Gustavo Fuentes; 85' Faturazi Rozi | Stadium: Pasir Gudang Corporation Stadium |

| 11 December 2005 2 | Sabah | 0–1 | Johor FC | Kota Kinabalu, Sabah |
| | | | 38' Gastón Marcelo Conlón | Stadium: Likas Stadium |

| 18 December 2005 3 | Johor FC | 1–1 | Shahzan Muda | Pasir Gudang, Johor |
| | 63' Gastón Marcelo Conlón | | 24' Shahzan Muda; 24' Akmal Farhan | Stadium: Pasir Gudang Corporation Stadium |

| 21 December 2005 4 | Kelantan TNB | 0–0 | Johor FC | Langkawi, Kedah |
| | | | | Stadium: Langkawi LADA Stadium |

| 1 January 2006 5 | Johor FC | 3–2 | Kuala Lumpur | Pasir Gudang, Johor |
| | 14', 86' Gastón Conlón; 31' Victor Rafael | | 10' Facundo Martín Aguello; 56' Mohd Shahriful Hisham | Stadium: Pasir Gudang Corporation Stadium |

| 8 January 2006 6 | PDRM | 2–5 | Johor FC | Selayang, Selangor |
| | 78' Willie Brown; 89' David Anas | | 25' Gastón Marcelo Conlón; 43' Eddy Helmi Manan; 60', 80' Mohd Ezaidy Khadar; 83' Mohd Aiman Wong | Stadium: Selayang Municipal Council Stadium |

| 15 January 2006 7 | PKNS | 0–2 | Johor FC | Kelana Jaya, Selangor |
| | | | 28' Gastón Conlón; 85' Mohd Ezaidy Khadar | Stadium: Petaling Jaya Stadium |

| 22 January 2006 8 | Melaka | 0–1 | Johor FC | Melaka, Melaka |
| | | | 13' Mohd Aiman Wong | Stadium: Hang Jebat Stadium |

| 5 February 2006 9 | Johor FC | 2–3 | Sabah | Pasir Gudang, Johor |
| | 26' Juan Marcelo Corelli; 41' Gastón Conlón | | 31' Ahmad Nor Afandy; 52', 61' Deddy Olicheh | Stadium: Pasir Gudang Corporation Stadium |

| 26 February 2006 10 | Shahzan Muda | 1–1 | Johor FC | Kuantan, Pahang |
| | 28' Pablo Cesar Villa | | 12' A. Ganeson | Stadium: Darul Makmur Stadium |

| 4 March 2006 11 | Johor FC | 2–0 | Kelantan TNB | Pasir Gudang, Johor |
| | 68' Syaiful Sabtu; 82' Juan Corelli | | | Stadium: Pasir Gudang Corporation Stadium |

| 11 March 2006 12 | Kuala Lumpur | 1–0 | Johor FC | Kuala Lumpur |
| | 42' Carlos Quinones | | | Stadium: Cheras Stadium |

| 18 March 2006 13 | Johor FC | 1–2 | PDRM | Pasir Gudang, Johor |
| | 21' Racine Diouf | | 81' David Anas; 87' Fauzi Majid | Stadium: Pasir Gudang Corporation Stadium |

| 25 March 2006 14 | Johor FC | 1–1 | PKNS | Pasir Gudang, Johor |
| | 26' Syaiful Sabtu | | 15' Roman Chmelo | Stadium: Pasir Gudang Corporation Stadium |

| 1 April 2006 15 | Melaka | 2–1 | Johor FC | Melaka, Melaka |
| | 65' Faturazi Rozi; 24' Gustavo Fuentes | | 57' Racine Diouf | Stadium: Hang Jebat Stadium |

| 8 April 2006 16 | Johor FC | 3–1 | Sabah | Pasir Gudang, Johor |
| | 20' Eddy Helmi; 38' Ezaidy Khadar; 69' Gaston Conlon | | 81' Ahmad Afandy | Stadium: Pasir Gudang Corporation Stadium |

| 17 April 2006 17 | Shahzan Muda | 3–3 | Johor FC | Kuantan, Pahang |
| | 37', 73', 89' Tengku Adam Rosly | | 59', 83' A. Ganeson; 16' Victor Rafael | Stadium: Darul Makmur Stadium |

| 22 April 2006 18 | Johor FC | 4–2 | Kelantan TNB | Pasir Gudang, Johor |
| | 18', 65', 88' Gaston Conlon; 53' Hamzani Omar | | 70' Farlie Firdaus Salim; 85' Abdul Ghani Malek | Stadium: Pasir Gudang Corporation Stadium |

| 6 May 2006 19 | Kuala Lumpur | 0–1 | Johor FC | Kuala Lumpur |
| | | | 28' Aiman Wong | Stadium: Cheras Stadium |

| 10 May 2006 20 | Johor FC | 1–1 | PDRM | Pasir Gudang, Johor |
| | 9' Khairul Naib | | 78' David Anas | Stadium: Pasir Gudang Corporation Stadium |

| 22 May 2006 21 | Johor FC | 2–2 | PKNS | Pasir Gudang, Johor |
| | 35', 66' Sumardi Hajalan | | 29' Sairollizam Siedin; 41' Roman Chmelo | Stadium: Pasir Gudang Corporation Stadium |

==== Promotion Play-off ====
===== First round =====
| 18 June 2006 1st leg | Johor FC | 2–3 | Selangor | Pasir Gudang, Johor |
| | 29', 78' Eddy Helmi | | 11', 46' Amri Yahya; 22' Bambang | Stadium: Pasir Gudang Corporation Stadium |

| 21 June 2006 2nd leg | Selangor | 4–2 (7–4 agg.) | Johor FC | Shah Alam, Selangor |
| | 3', 12' Brian Fuentes; 64' Ellie Aiboy; 84' Shukor Adan | | 35' Faruzzhar Ali; 41' Mohd Ezaidy Khadar | Stadium: Shah Alam Stadium |

===== Final Round =====
| 25 June 2006 1st leg | PKNS | 1–4 | Johor FC | Petaling Jaya, Selangor |
| | 5' Roman Chmelo | | 12' Juan Marcelo Corelli; 34' Azizan Baba; 52' Racine Diouf; 87' Eddy Helmi | Stadium: Petaling Jaya Stadium |

| 28 June 2006 2nd leg | Johor FC | 1–1 (5–2 agg.) | PKNS | Pasir Gudang, Johor |
| | 46' Hairy Azly | | 29' Sairollizam Siedin | Stadium: Pasir Gudang Corporation Stadium |

==== League table ====
| Pos | Team | Pld | W | D | L | GF | GA | GD | Pts | Promotion |
|---|---|---|---|---|---|---|---|---|---|---|
| 1 | Malacca | 21 | 13 | 4 | 4 | 48 | 24 | +24 | 43 | Promoted to 2006–07 Liga Super |
| 2 | (Selangor) PKNS | 21 | 11 | 6 | 4 | 39 | 25 | +14 | 39 | |
| 3 | Johor FC | 21 | 9 | 8 | 4 | 38 | 27 | +11 | 35 | Promoted to 2006–07 Liga Super |
| 4 | Sabah | 21 | 7 | 7 | 7 | 32 | 31 | +1 | 28 | |

=== Malaysia FA Cup ===
==== First round ====
Win Draw Loss

| 8 February 2006 1st leg | Terengganu | 2–3 | Johor FC | Kuala Terengganu, Terengganu |
| | 41' Norhisham Hassan; 69' Rosairil Mat Nor | | 10', 67' Gaston Conlon; 23' Hairy Azly | Stadium: Sultan Mizan Zainal Abidin Stadium |

| 15 February 2006 2nd leg | Johor FC | 0–3 (3–4 agg.) | Terengganu | Pasir Gudang, Johor |
| | | | 4' Norizam Ali Hassan; 16' Helton Soares; 22' Mohd Norhisham Hassan | Stadium: Pasir Gudang Corporation Stadium |

=== Malaysia Cup ===
==== Group stage ====
| Team | Pld | W | D | L | GF | GA | Pts |
|---|---|---|---|---|---|---|---|
| Telekom Melaka | 6 | 2 | 4 | 0 | 12 | 10 | 10 |
| Penang E&O | 6 | 2 | 3 | 1 | 9 | 6 | 9 |
| Kedah | 6 | 2 | 2 | 2 | 13 | 12 | 8 |
| Johor FC | 6 | 1 | 1 | 4 | 12 | 18 | 4 |

| 2 July 2006 1 | Melaka Telekom | 4–4 | Johor FC | Malacca City, Malacca |
| | 33', 62' (pen.) Mohd Hardi Jaafar; 36' Chaswe Nsofwa; 76' Tengku Hasbullah Raja Hassan | | 9' Mohd Aiman Wong; 54' Mohd Ezaidy Khadar; 78' Syaiful Sabtu; 89' Juan Marcelo Corelli | Stadium: Hang Tuah Stadium |

| 8 July 2006 2 | Johor FC | 0–1 | Pulau Pinang E&O | Pasir Gudang, Johor |
| | | | 25' (pen.) Saša Brezenec | Stadium: Pasir Gudang Corporation Stadium |

| 15 July 2006 3 | Johor FC | 4–3 | Kedah | Pasir Gudang, Johor |
| | 24' Eddy Helmi Manan; 29', 71' Gaston Conlon; 83' Azuwan Roya | | 6' Marcos Magno; 38' Paolo Roberto da Silva; 54' (o.g.) A. Ganeson | Stadium: Pasir Gudang Corporation Stadium |

| 19 July 2006 4 | Johor FC | 1–2 | Melaka Telekom | Pasir Gudang, Johor |
| | 90' Kim Dong-hwan | | 35' Redzuan Mohd Radzi; 78' Zainuddin Ariffin | Stadium: Pasir Gudang Corporation Stadium |

| 24 July 2006 5 | Pulau Pinang E&O | 4–1 | Johor FC | Batu Kawan, Penang |
| | 24', 32', 77' (pen.) Ng Kok Heng; 68' Saša Brezenec | | 27' Gaston Conlon | Stadium: Penang State Stadium |

| 29 July 2006 6 | Kedah | 4–2 | Johor FC | Alor Setar, Kedah |
| | 11' Khyril Muhymeen Zambri; 35' Ahmad Fauzi Shaari; 52' Marcos Magno; 81' Paolo Roberto da Silva | | 34' Azizan Baba; 76' Syaiful Sabtu | Stadium: Darul Aman Stadium |

== Club statistics ==
Includes all competitive matches. The list is sorted by shirt number when total goals are equal.

| Rank | Pos. | No. | Player | Premier League | FA Cup | Malaysia Cup | Total |
|---|---|---|---|---|---|---|---|
| 1 | FW | 30 | (Argentina) Gaston Conlon | 13 | 2 | 3 | 18 |
| 2 | MF | 9 | (Malaysia) Eddy Helmi | 5 | 0 | 1 | 6 |
| 3 | MF | 20 | (Malaysia) Ezaidy Khadar | 5 | 0 | 1 | 6 |
| 4 | DF | 7 | (Argentina) Marcelo Cirelli | 4 | 0 | 1 | 5 |
| 5 | DF | 8 | (Senegal) Racine Diouf | 3 | 0 | 2 | 5 |
| 6 | MF | 26 | (Malaysia) Aiman Wong | 3 | 0 | 1 | 4 |
| 7 | DF | 14 | (Malaysia) A. Ganeson | 3 | 0 | 0 | 3 |
| 8 | MF | 25 | (Argentina) Victor Rafael | 2 | 0 | 0 | 2 |
| 9 | FW | 31 | (Malaysia) Syaiful Sabtu | 2 | 0 | 0 | 2 |
| 10 | DF | 35 | (Malaysia) Sumardi Hajalan | 2 | 0 | 0 | 2 |
| 11 | MF | 8 | (Malaysia) Azizan Baba | 1 | 0 | 1 | 2 |
| 12 | MF | 24 | (Malaysia) Hairy Azly | 1 | 1 | 0 | 2 |
| 13 | MF | 33 | (Malaysia) Azwan Roya | 0 | 0 | 1 | 1 |
| 14 | MF | 16 | (Malaysia) Khairul Naib | 1 | 0 | 0 | 1 |
| 15 | MF | 28 | (South Korea) Kim Dong-hwan | 0 | 0 | 1 | 1 |
| 16 | FW | 29 | (Malaysia) Faruzzhar Ali | 1 | 0 | 0 | 1 |
| Own Goals | | | | 0 | 0 | 1 | 1 |
| TOTALS | | | | 46 | 3 | 12 | 62 |
