= Wan Mohd Hoesne =

Malaysian footballer

Personal information
- Birth name: Wan Mohd Hoesne bin Wan Hussain
- Date of birth: 2 September 1987 (age 39)
- Place of birth: Selangor, Malaysia
- Height: 1.72 m (5 ft 7 1/2 in)
- Position: Striker

Team information
- Current team: Sabah FA
- Number: 13

Youth career
- 2007–2008: Selangor FA President's Cup Team

Senior career*
Years	Team	Apps	(Gls)
2008–2011	Johor FC	28	(3)
2012–2013	Selangor FA	14	(5)
2014	Sabah FA	0	(0)

International career^{‡}
- Malaysia
- * Club domestic league appearances and goals as of 7 March 2013 ‡ National team caps and goals as of 7 March 2013

Wan Mohd Hoesne bin Wan Hussain (born 2 September 1987) is a Malaysian footballer who plays as a striker for Selangor FA.

== Career ==
In December 2008, he joined Johor FC for the 2009 season from Selangor FA President's Cup Team. Later, the club released him and in December 2011, he signed a contract with Selangor FA for the 2012 Malaysia Super League season.
