= Wan Rohaimi =

Malaysian footballer and coach

Personal information
- Birth name: Wan Rohaimi bin Wan Ismail
- Date of birth: 19 May 1976 (age 50)
- Place of birth: Kota Bharu, Kelantan, Malaysia
- Height: 1.75 m (5 ft 9 in)
- Positions: Defender; striker; central midfielder

Youth career
- 1996-1997: Kelantan

Senior career*
Years	Team	Apps	(Gls)
1997–1998	Kelantan		
1999–2000	Pahang		
2001–2002	Terengganu		
2003–2004	Penang		
2004–2005	Public Bank		
2005–2006	Selangor		
2006–2010	Johor FC		
2011	Kelantan		

International career^{‡}
1999–2006	Malaysia	16	(5)

Managerial career
- 2012–2013: WR Soccer Kids
- 2013–2014: Tumpat
- 2014–2019: NFDP U16
- 2019–2020: Perlis FA
- 2020–2021: Penang U21
- 2021–2022: PDRM
- 2023: Kuala Lumpur City U23
- 2024: Kuala Lumpur City (assistant)
- 2024–2026: Penang
- * Club domestic league appearances and goals as of 10 May 2012 ‡ National team caps and goals as of 9 December 2010

Wan Rohaimi bin Wan Ismail (born 19 May 1976) is a Malaysian former footballer and professional football coach. He is recently the head coach at Malaysia Super League club, Penang.

== Playing career ==
He is known as a multi-position player as he played as a defender, central midfielder and striker. He started his career as a professional football player in 1996, representing Kelantan FA President's Cup squad. He was promoted to the senior team after winning the President's Cup title in that year. He then transferred to Pahang FA in 1999. He became one of the top scorers in the league and made his debut with the Malaysia national football team in a friendly match against Arsenal that same year. He also represented several teams in Malaysian Football League (MFL) such as Kelantan FA, Johor FC, Terengganu FA, Selangor FA and Selangor Public Bank FC.

He represented the Malaysia national football team between 1999 and 2006, participating in national competitions including FIFA World Cup qualifier and Tiger Cup.

== Managerial career ==
His managerial career started by leading Tumpat FA in the middle of 2013 FAM League. He joined National Football Development Programme of Malaysia (NFDP) coaching staff from 2014 to 2018. He was also a former U-13 and U-15 Malaysia national team coach participating in national tours, including Iber Cup Estoril, Portugal and Costa Del Sol, Spain.

As part of the National U-16 coaching staff, alongside Lim Teong Kim, he participated in the AFC U-16 Championship in Kuala Lumpur 2017. In 2018, he took the lead for the Klang Valley Elite team. In 2019, he was introduced as the head coach for Perlis FA Youth Cup (U-19) squad, but the club later relegated from the Malaysian Football League due to financial problems. He continued his career as head coach of Penang FA President's Cup (U-21). However, the President's Cup tournament was suspended after four matches due to the COVID-19 pandemic, where Penang FA finished in the third place sharing 10 points with the top 2 teams.

In March 2021, Wan Rohaimi was appointed as the head coach of PDRM FC in the Malaysia Premier League after five matches had already been played. During the 2021 season, he brought the club to a safe place from relegation, going on a seven-game unbeaten run since he took over the team in early April 2021. On 4 September 2022, it was announced that PDRM FC had parted ways with Wan Rohaimi.

In 2023, he was appointed to lead the Kuala Lumpur City F.C. U-23 for the Reserve League team that would be held under Malaysian Football League. Continuing into the 2024 season, he was promoted to the senior team as assistant head coach under Miroslav Kuljanac. On 14 November 2024, Kuala Lumpur City F.C. announced the departure of Wan Rohaimi from the club after eight months working with the senior team. Later that day, Penang FC announced that Wan Rohaimi would return as the new head coach, taking charge of the Panthers until the end of the season.

== Managerial method ==
Wan Rohaimi has developed a modern football pattern. In 2019, he introduced the WR Notebook for coaches to take note and make plans about football. He later released the WR Session Plan which provides examples of football training plans along with detailed descriptions. This was followed by his third book, Coaching Process, which outlines the steps to becoming a coach. He then published Teknik Asas Bolasepak, aimed at helping football players understand the basic techniques and concepts of the game.

=== Books ===
- WR Notebook - A notebook designed for coaches/players to make notes or design tactical plans.
- WR Session Plan - A guide for team planning with four key components for training sessions.
- WR Coaching Process - A step-by-step guide on how to become a good coach.
- WR Teknik Asas Bolasepak - A practical book explaining the basic football techniques for beginners.

== Managerial statistics ==
As of 1 November 2026

Managerial record by team and tenure
Team	Nat.	From	To	Record					Ref.
Team	Nat.	From	To	G	W	D	L	Win %	Ref.
PDRM	(Malaysia)	31 March 2021	4 September 2022	33	12	8	13	36.36	
Penang	(Malaysia)	14 November 2024	1 November 2026	62	21	14	27	33.87	
Career Total				95	33	22	40	34.74	

== International experiences ==
=== Player ===
- AFC Cup: 2006 (Selangor FA), 2008/2010 (Johor Darul Ta'zim FC)
- Tiger Cup: 2004 (Malaysia national football team)
- World Cup qualifier: 2006 (Malaysia national football team)

=== Manager ===
- Iber Cup: Costa Del Sol, Spain (2015), Estoril, Portugal (2015) Malaysia national football team u-13
- ASEAN Tour: Thailand, Cambodia, Vietnam (2015) Malaysia national football team u-13
- AFC Regional Festival of Football: Brunei, (2016) Malaysia national football team u-14
- AFC Cup: Malaysia, (2017) Malaysia national football team u-16
- AFF Cup: Thailand, (2017) Malaysia national football team u-15
- CP-Meiji Cup: Thailand, (2016) Malaysia national football team u-14

== Honours ==
=== Youth career ===
- 1996 - President Cup gold medal with Kelantan FA u-21

=== Senior career ===
- 1999 - Premier League first title with Pahang FA
- 2001 - Malaysia Cup winner with Terengganu FA
- 2002 - Charity Shield silver medal with Pahang FA
- 2003 - Charity Shield gold medal with Penang FA
- 2006 - Charity Shield silver medal with Selangor FA
- 2011 - Malaysia Super League gold medal, Charity Shield gold medal, Malaysia FA Cup silver medal with Kelantan FA

=== Managerial career ===
- 2015 - Iber Cup Costa Del Sol, Spain gold medal with NFDP Malaysia u-13
- 2016 - KPM League first place with Sekolah Sukan Bukit Jalil (SSBJ) u-14
