= Eddy Helmi =

Malaysian footballer

Personal information
- Full name: Eddy Helmi Bin Abdul Manan
- Date of birth: 8 December 1979 (age 46)
- Place of birth: Pontian, Johor, Malaysia
- Height: 1.65 m (5 ft 5 in)
- Position: Attacking midfielder

Youth career
- 1997–2000: Johor FC

Senior career*
Years	Team	Apps	(Gls)
2001–2012	Johor FC	175	(35)
2013–2014	Negeri Sembilan FA	29	(1)
2015	Sime Darby FC	10	(0)

International career^{‡}
2000–2002	Malaysia U-23	0	(0)
2002–2007	Malaysia	30	(3)
- * Club domestic league appearances and goals as of 8 December 2012 ‡ National team caps and goals as of 8 December 2012

Eddy Helmi Bin Abdul Manan (born 8 December 1979 in Pontian, Johor) is a former Malaysian international footballer who played as an attacking midfielder.

Eddy is one of longest serving player in the Johor FC. On 18 December 2014, he signed a contract with Sime Darby.

== International career ==
Eddy started representing the team in 2001. In 2002, Eddy received his first call-up for the Malaysia national team. He made his full international debut against Singapore. He played in the 2002 Asian Games with Malaysia U-23. He also played two ASEAN Football Championship with Malaysia in 2002 and 2007. He was also included in the 2007 Asian Cup squad, playing only one match, against China.

== Honours ==
=== Club ===
Johor FC

- Liga Perdana 2 : 2001
