= Mansaray =

Mansaray is a Sierra Leonean surname. Notable people with the surname include:

- Binta Mansaray, Sierra Leonean United Nations official
- Chernor Mansaray (born 1976), Sierra Leonean footballer
- Jusufu Mansaray, Sierra Leonean politician
- Minkailu Mansaray, Sierra Leonean politician
- Sidique Mansaray (born 1980), Sierra Leonean footballer
- Tejan Amadu Mansaray, Sierra Leonean politician
