= M. Sivakumar =

Malaysian footballer

Personal information
- Full name: Sivakumar a/l Munusamy
- Date of birth: 6 March 1984 (age 42)
- Place of birth: Sabah, Malaysia
- Height: 1.75 m (5 ft 9 in)
- Position: Midfielder

Team information
- Current team: Petaling Jaya City
- Number: 18

Youth career
- 2004–2005: Johor FC

Senior career*
| Years | Team | Apps | (Gls) |
| 2006–2010 | Johor FC | 23 | (1) |
| 2010–2011 | Sabah FA | 28 | (0) |
| 2012 | Felda United | 31 | (0) |
| 2013 | Perak FA | 33 | (0) |
| 2014 | Negeri Sembilan FA | 21 | (0) |
| 2015–2018 | PKNS FC | 60 | (0) |
| 2019–20 | Petaling Jaya City FC | 0 | (0) |
| 2020- | Harini F.C. | 0 | (0) |
- * Club domestic league appearances and goals as of 18 December 2020

Sivakumar a/l Munusamy (born 6 March 1984) is a Malaysian footballer who plays for Petaling Jaya City FC in Malaysia Super League. Sivakumar mainly plays as a defensive midfielder but also can play as a centre-back or as a central midfielder.

== Club career ==
=== PKNS ===
In November 2014, Sivakumar signed with PKNS from Negeri Sembilan. He made 24 appearances during his debut season.

== Personal life ==
Sivakumar married to Sabah Chinese-Kadazan wife.
