= Mohd Azizan Baba =

Malaysian footballer (1981–2022)

Personal information
- Full name: Mohd Azizan bin Baba
- Date of birth: 9 September 1981
- Place of birth: Melaka, Malaysia
- Date of death: 22 March 2022 (aged 40)
- Height: 1.77 m (5 ft 10 in)
- Position: Midfielder

Youth career
- 2000–2001: Perak FA President's Cup

Senior career*
Years	Team	Apps	(Gls)
2002–2004	Perak FA	12	(0)
2005–2006	Kuala Lumpur FA	22	(6)
2007–2008	Malacca FA	18	(2)
2009–2011	Johor FC	19	(3)
2012–2013	Sarawak FA	28	(6)
2014	Penang FA		
2015	Melaka United		
2016	SAMB		

Managerial career
- 2019: SAMB (assistant)
- 2020: SAMB
- 2020: Melaka United FC
- * Club domestic league appearances and goals

Mohd Azizan bin Baba (9 September 1981 – 22 March 2022) was a Malaysian football player and coach.

== Career ==
Azizan played for Sarawak from 2012 until 2013. After that, he joined Malaysia Premier League side, Penang FA for the 2014 season, appointed captain until end of season. He also played for Perak, Johor, Kuala Lumpur and Malacca.

== Personal life ==
Azizan was a Malay with Baba-Nyonya descendant, the Chinese peranakan that stayed so long in Malacca for hundred years. He died on 22 March 2022, at the age of 40 due to cancer.

== Honours ==
Perak

- Liga Perdana 1: 2003

Sarawak

- Malaysia Premier League: 2013

Melaka United

- Malaysia FAM League: 2015

Sporting positions
Preceded by Mohd Zharif Hasna	Penang captain 2014	Succeeded by Mohd Redzuan Nawi
Preceded by Mohd Fauzzi Kassim	Melaka United captain 2015	Succeeded by Mohamad Faiz Suhaimi
Preceded by TBA	SAMB captain 2016	Succeeded by Hafizuddin Mohd Said
