= 2001 Liga Perdana 2 =

2001 Malaysia Liga Perdana 2
- Season: 2001
- Champions: Johor FC
- Promoted: Johor FC; Sabah; NS Chempaka
- Matches: 264

The 2001 Malaysia Liga Perdana 2 was the fourth season of the Liga Perdana 2, the second tier of the Malaysian football league system. A total of 12 teams participated in this season.

Sabah and Brunei were relegated from the Liga Perdana 1, while Kedah JKR and PDRM were promoted from the Malaysia FAM League. The season began on 2 April 2001.

== Teams ==
12 teams competed in the 2001 season.

- Johor FC
- Sabah
- (Negeri Sembilan) NS Chempaka
- Brunei
- Kelantan TNB
- (Malacca) Melaka TMFC
- Kelantan JKR
- (Kuala Lumpur) KL Malay Mail
- Kedah JKR
- (Malaysia) PDRM FA
- Kedah FA
- (Malaysia) ATM

== League table ==
| Pos | Team | Pld | W | D | L | GF | GA | GD | Pts | Qualification or relegation |
|---|---|---|---|---|---|---|---|---|---|---|
| 1 | Johor FC (C) | 22 | 14 | 5 | 3 | 42 | 20 | +22 | 47 | Promoted to the Liga Perdana 1 |
| 2 | Sabah | 22 | 14 | 3 | 5 | 41 | 22 | +19 | 45 | Promoted to the Liga Perdana 1 |
| 3 | (Negeri Sembilan) NS Chempaka | 22 | 10 | 7 | 5 | 29 | 20 | +9 | 37 | Promoted to the Liga Perdana 1 |
| 4 | Brunei | 22 | 10 | 3 | 9 | 34 | 27 | +7 | 33 | |
| 5 | Kelantan TNB | 22 | 9 | 5 | 8 | 33 | 34 | −1 | 32 | |
| 6 | (Malacca) Melaka TMFC | 22 | 9 | 4 | 9 | 27 | 32 | −5 | 31 | |
| 7 | Kelantan JKR | 22 | 7 | 8 | 7 | 41 | 34 | +7 | 29 | Withdrew from the Liga Perdana 2 and dissolved |
| 8 | (Kuala Lumpur) KL Malay Mail | 22 | 5 | 9 | 8 | 28 | 40 | −12 | 24 | |
| 9 | Kedah JKR | 22 | 6 | 6 | 10 | 27 | 38 | −11 | 24 | |
| 10 | (Malaysia) PDRM FA | 22 | 6 | 4 | 12 | 28 | 41 | −13 | 22 | |
| 11 | Kedah FA | 22 | 5 | 6 | 11 | 31 | 37 | −6 | 21 | |
| 12 | (Malaysia) ATM | 22 | 4 | 6 | 12 | 23 | 39 | −16 | 18 | |

Rules for classification: 1) Points; 2) Goal difference; 3) Number of goals scored.
(C) League Champion
