= Mohd Nurul Azwan Roya =

Malaysian footballer

Nurul Azwan Roya
Personal information
- Full name: Mohd Nurul Azwan bin Roya
- Date of birth: 25 June 1986 (age 40)
- Place of birth: Pasir Puteh, Kelantan
- Height: 1.65 m (5 ft 5 in)
- Position: Winger

Youth career
- 2002–2005: Kelantan FA

Senior career*
Years	Team	Apps	(Gls)
2005–2010	Johor FC	24	(17)
2011–2012	Kelantan	19	(6)
2013–2014	Johor Darul Ta'zim	8	(1)
2015	PDRM	11	(5)
2016	Johor Darul Ta'zim II	7	(3)
2017	Kelantan	0	(0)
2022	D'AR Wanderers F.C.	3	(0)
- * Club domestic league appearances and goals as of March 26, 2016 ‡ National team caps and goals as of March 26, 2016

Mohd Nurul Azwan Roya (born 25 June 1986) is a Malaysian footballer who plays as a midfielder. He is also known as Awe by his teammate since his time with Johor FC.

== Career ==
=== Johor FC ===
Nurul Azwan Roya was born in Pasir Puteh, Kelantan. He attended a local school and started playing for the Kelantan FA President's Cup Team at the age of 20. He was promoted to play for the Johor senior team in 2005.

=== Kelantan ===
After a long season with Johor FC, he joined Kelantan FA. He achieved a lot of success with Kelantan FA, especially in the 2012 season after helping his team complete the treble by winning the Malaysia Cup 2012. He also represented Kelantan in the 2012 AFC Cup.

=== Return to Johor FC ===
Azwan left Kelantan FA after one season to return to Johor for the 2013 Malaysia Super League. On 2 March 2013, he scored his first goal for the club in a 2–1 defeat of Negeri Sembilan FA. Being a key player of 2013's Johor, he managed to make 7 assist and 4 goals for that season.

=== PDRM FA ===
After failing to cement his spot at Johor Darul Ta'zim F.C., he signed with PDRM FA in 2015. However, during the mid season, PDRM FA terminated his contract along with Muslim Ahmad after they did not perform well while playing for the PDRM FA.

=== Return to Kelantan ===
He returned to Kelantan for the 2017 season, but was released at the end of the season.

== International career ==
Nurul Azwan Roya was called up to represent national Under-19 team for trials in 2004.

== Honours ==
Johor Darul Takzim

- Malaysia Super League: 2014

Kelantan FA

- Malaysia Cup: 2012
- Malaysia Super League: 2012
- Malaysia FA Cup: 2012
