= Sumardi Hajalan =

Malaysian footballer

Personal information
- Full name: Sumardi Hajalan
- Date of birth: 12 January 1985 (age 41)
- Place of birth: Tawau, Sabah, Malaysia
- Height: 1.68 m (5 ft 6 in)
- Positions: Defender; midfielder

Youth career
- 2004: Sabah U-21

Senior career*
Years	Team	Apps	(Gls)
2004–2005	Sabah	?	(0)
2006–2010	Johor FC	?	(1)
2011–2013	Sabah	43	(0)
2014	Negeri Sembilan	3	(0)
2015	Perak	0	(0)
2016	Perlis	17	(0)
2017–2018	Sabah	0	(0)

International career^{‡}
2005–2007	Malaysia U-23	13	(0)
2007	Malaysia	2	(0)
- * Club domestic league appearances and goals as of 7 October 2014 ‡ National team caps and goals as of 7 October 2014

Sumardi Hajalan (born 12 January 1985 in Tawau, Sabah) is a former Malaysian footballer.

== Career ==
=== Club ===
At club level, Sumardi spent most of his career at Sabah where he made his debut against Penang during the second leg of 2004 Malaysia FA Cup. He also played for Johor FC, Negeri Sembilan, and Perlis. He signed with Perak in 2015 but only made an appearances in the 2015 Malaysia Cup against ATM.

=== International ===
At international level, Sumardi made his first appearances with Malaysia national under 23 team at the 2005 AFF U-23 Youth Championship under Bertalan Bisckei. He became a regular with the Malaysia U-23 national team in 2007 under B. Sathianathan. He played in the 2007 Merdeka Tournament, in which he started as the first choice left back for the entire tournament as Malaysia won the trophy after 14 years. He also participated at the 2007 Southeast Asian Games. He made his international senior debut in the 2010 World Cup qualifiers against Bahrain on 21 October 2007.
