= Hamzani Omar =

Malaysian footballer (born 1978)

Personal information
- Full name: Mohd Hamzani bin Omar
- Date of birth: 30 September 1978 (age 48)
- Place of birth: Johor, Malaysia
- Position: Defender

Youth career
- 1997: Malacca FA

Senior career*
Years	Team	Apps	(Gls)
1998–2006	Johor FC	?	(10)
2006–2007	Johor FA	?	(2)
2007–2012	Johor FC	?	(6)

International career^{‡}
1999–2007	Malaysia	6	(0)

Managerial career
- 2013–: Johor Darul Ta'zim (assistant coach)
- 2022: Johor Darul Ta'zim (interim)
- * Club domestic league appearances and goals as of 13 January 2009 ‡ National team caps and goals as of 2 December 2008

Mohd Hamzani bin Omar (born 30 September 1978 in Johor, Malaysia) is a former Malaysian footballer and a football coach. He is the current assistant coach for Malaysia Super League club Johor Darul Ta'zim.

== Club career ==
As a football player, Hamzani mostly spend his career at Johor in the Malaysian league. He played for Johor FC from 1998 until 2006. He moved to Johor FA in 2006 and return to Johor FC in 2007 and played for them until 2012. He won 2001 Liga Perdana 2 with Johor FC.

== International career ==
On 3 July 1999, Hamzani made his international debut against New Zealand. 8 years after his international debut, he made a return to the national team and was selected to represent Malaysia for the 2007 AFC Asian Cup where he played one match against Iran at the tournament.

== Coaching career ==
Since 2013, Hamzani has been involved with coaching at Johor Darul Ta'zim. In the 2022 Malaysia Super League season, Hamzani briefly took charge of Johor Darul Ta'zim matches against Penang on 20 July 2022 due to Benjamin Mora's departure in which he guided the club to a narrow 1–0 away win.
