= Pasir Gudang Corporation Stadium =

Stadium in Johor, Malaysia

Coordinates: 1°27′43″N 103°53′53″E

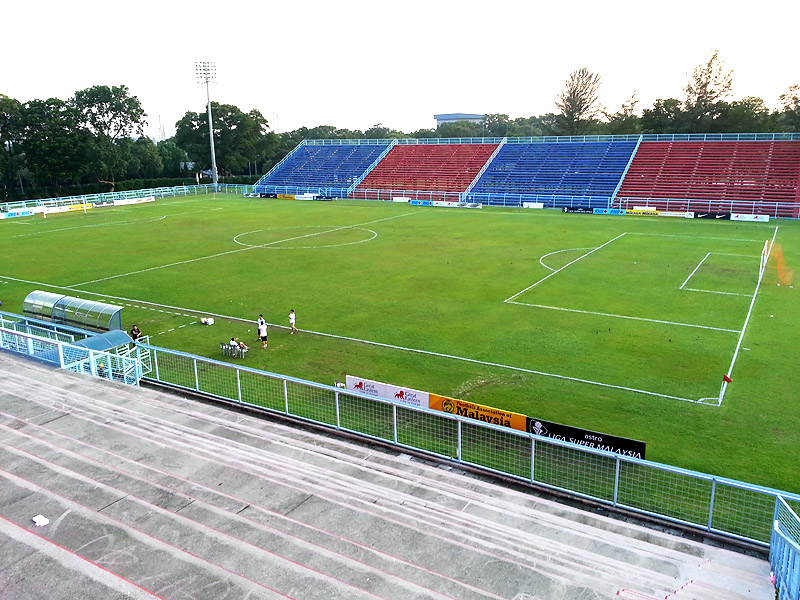
- Interactive map of Pasir Gudang Corporation Stadium
- Location: Stadium JCorp Pasir Gudang, Jalan Bandar, 81700 Pasir Gudang, Johor
- Owner: Pasir Gudang Municipal Council
- Capacity: 15,000
- Surface: Grass

Tenants
- Johor Darul Ta'zim II F.C. (until 2020); Johor Darul Ta'zim III F.C.

The Pasir Gudang Corporation Stadium (Malay: Stadium Perbadanan Pasir Gudang) is a multi-use stadium in Pasir Gudang, Johor Bahru District, Johor, Malaysia. It has both an indoor and outdoor stadium within its compound.

The outdoor stadium can hold a maximum of 15,000 people and is currently used mostly for football matches, serving as the home venue to Johor Darul Ta'zim II F.C.

== See also ==
- Sport in Malaysia
