= Johor Darul Ta'zim F.C. =

Malaysian football club

Johor Darul Ta'zim
- Full name: Johor Darul Ta'zim Football Club
- Nickname: Harimau Selatan (Southern Tigers)
- Short name: JDT
- Founded: 1972; 54 years ago (as PKENJ FC)
- Ground: Sultan Ibrahim Stadium
- Capacity: 40,000
- Coordinates: 1.4816°N 103.6192°E
- Owner: Tunku Ismail Idris
- President: Tunku Aminah Maimunah Iskandariah
- Head coach: Xisco Muñoz
- League: Malaysia Super League
- 2025–26: Malaysia Super League, 1st of 13 (champions)
- Website: johorsoutherntigers.my
Home colours	Away colours	Third colours

Johor Darul Ta'zim Football Club, or simply JDT, is a professional football club based in Johor Bahru, Johor, Malaysia, that competes in the Malaysia Super League, the top tier of Malaysian football. Founded in 1972 as PKENJ FC, the club was renamed Johor FC in 1996 before adopting its current name in 2013. Johor Darul Ta'zim is owned by Tunku Ismail Idris, the Crown Prince of Johor.

In 2014, JDT won its first major honour by winning the national league during the first season under Croatian manager Bojan Hodak. Under Argentine Mario Gómez's tutelage, they won both the 2015 AFC Cup and the 2015 Super League. By winning the AFC Cup, JDT became the second Malaysian team since 1967 to enter the final of a major continental competition, and the first ever Malaysian club to win a continental title. Between 2014 and 2026, JDT won twelve consecutive league titles. Before this achievement, no Malaysian team had ever won the league championship more than twice in a row since the league system was first introduced in Malaysia in 1982.

Since 2012, JDT have been known by the nickname Southern Tigers (Malay: Harimau Selatan), based on the coat of arms of the Johor State Council. The team's home ground is the 40,000-capacity Sultan Ibrahim Stadium. According to the Statista report from 2016, JDT are the most supported Malaysian Super League club and the second-most supported football club in Malaysia after Manchester United.

== History ==
=== Foundation and early years ===
The club were founded in 1972 as Perbadanan Kemajuan Ekonomi Negeri Johor (PKENJ) in Pasir Gudang, Johor. After winning the Malaysia FAM Cup twice, the Johor Corporation (a state funded corporation) decided to take over the club in 1996 and changed its name to Johor Football Club (Johor FC). The club finished as runners-up in the 1996 season.

In 1998, Johor FC were promoted to the second tier Malaysian football league, Liga Perdana 2 and won the title in 2001 which secured promotion to the first division, Liga Perdana 1. After two years in the top division, Johor FC were relegated to the new second-division, the Malaysia Premier League after failing to achieve promotion to the new top division, the Malaysia Super League during the 2003 season. The club earned an automatic promotion to the Malaysia Super League during the 2006–07 season after the Football Association of Malaysia's decision to expand the league to 14 teams and were a regular top 5 finisher in the league. Johor FC were the first club team in the Malaysian football league system to enter the Malaysia Cup in 2000 under English manager Bruce Stowell. The Malaysia Cup was previously dominated by state teams and by defeating ATM on aggregate in the second-round group qualification, the club marked another record in the competition. The club also participated in the AFC Cup in 2009 replacing Negeri Sembilan when the latter qualified but did not proceed to compete in the competition.

=== Decline and transformation of Johor FC (2010–2012) ===
By 2011, Johor FC experienced a period of decline driven by escalating financial troubles and a major reduction in corporate funding from Johor Corporation (JCorp). This lack of funding directly triggered a massive slump in on-pitch performance, a depleted squad, and dwindling fan attendance at the Pasir Gudang Stadium. The club's struggles peaked during the 2012 season, where they underperformed heavily, suffered critical operational losses, and barely escaped relegation in the Malaysia Super League by finishing just above the drop zone in 9th place.

This internal downfall mirrored a broader state crisis; Johorean football was in its poorest state, heavily underperforming and plagued by high-profile match-fixing investigations. While Johor FC fought relegation in the top flight, other local clubs — Johor FA, MBJB F.C., and MP Muar F.C. — struggled to survive in the second-tier Malaysia Premier League.

To save the teams from bankruptcy, Tunku Ismail Idris, who was appointed as the new President of Johor FA (PBNJ) on 16 February 2012, initiated a bold strategic revamp to consolidate Johorean football under a single management. Consequently, all Johor-based clubs except Johor FC and Johor FA were withdrawn from the league. Both remaining teams were placed under unified control and arranged in numerical order, completely absorbing Johor FC's top-flight slot. In December 2012, the Football Association of Malaysia approved the rebranding to Darul Ta'zim FC for the upcoming 2013 season, which was later renamed Johor Darul Ta'zim Football Club (JDT).

=== The transformation era ===
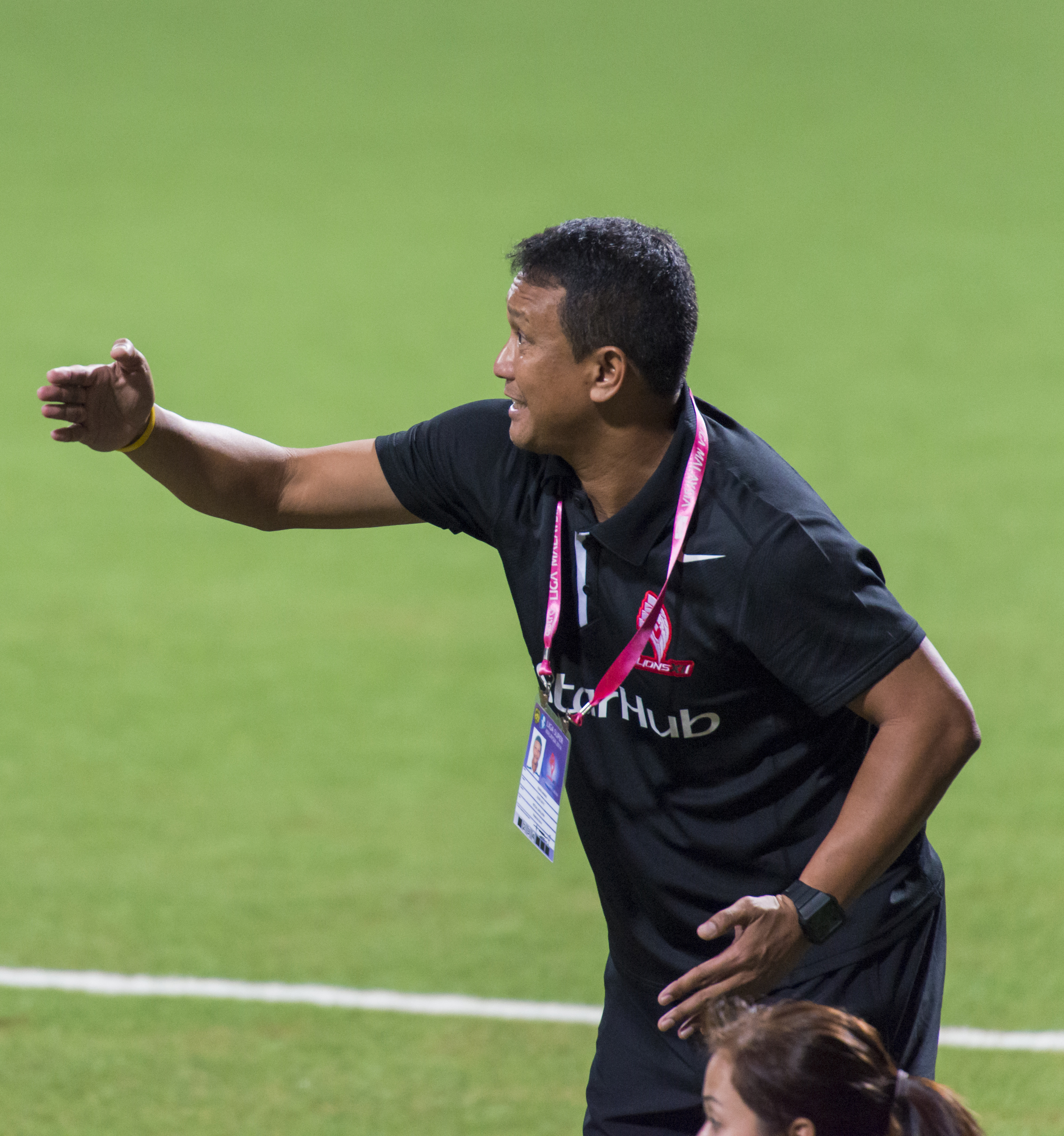
Fandi Ahmad was the first head coach of JDT following the club's rebranding in 2013

Officially, 2013 was the first year in which the Southern Tigers made its debut under the new transformation initiative. A fully refurnished Larkin Stadium was made to accommodate more fans. With the introduction of season passes, it allowed fans entry to all competitive matches for an entire season. At the start of the 2013 season, Fandi Ahmad was handed the role of head coach of the team in the Malaysia Super League, while the Malaysia Premier League team was handled by former international and Johor player, Azmi Mohamed, with the assistance of compatriot Ismail Ibrahim. Before the start of the season, Johor signed former Spanish international Dani Güiza and Italian midfielder Simone Del Nero. However, both left in the middle of the season. JDT managed to reach the 2013 Malaysia FA Cup final on away goals rule, defeating Pahang FA. In the final, JDT lost 1–0 to Kelantan FA. During the middle of the 2013 season, Fandi Ahmad was relieved of his coaching duties, but would stay on as the team's manager. Azmi Mohamed became JDT's coach on an interim basis while waiting for the arrival of a new head coach. In the first season after the club's transformation, JDT managed to finish third in the 2013 Malaysian Super League. Later on, just a day before the 2013 Malaysia Cup kicked off, Fandi Ahmad resigned as team manager and parted ways with Johor FA amicably. With the motivation to rejuvenate the glory days of the past into the future, JDT appointed former Valencia and Atlético Madrid manager Cesar Ferrando Jimenez as the new club's head coach.

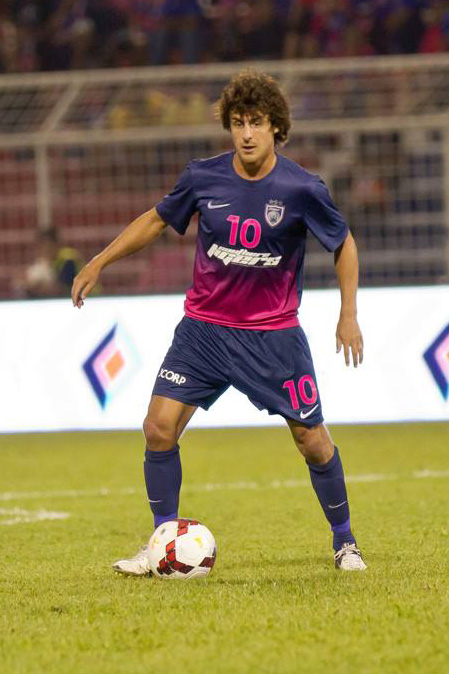
Pablo Aimar in action for Johor Darul Ta'zim in 2014

In February 2014, Bojan Hodak was appointed as team manager to assist Cesar Jimenez in managerial duties. On 26 June 2014, JDT secured their first national league title by defeating Sarawak FA 1–0. In the 2014 Malaysia Cup campaign, JDT made it through to the final for the first time in 23 years, emulating the former Johor FA that won the double (league and Malaysia Cup triumphs). Billed as the "Match of Heavyweights", it was a highly anticipated match between JDT (league champions) and Pahang (Malaysia FA Cup winners). JDT lost 5–3 in the penalty shoot-out.

On 31 January 2015, JDT competed in the Piala Sumbangsih for the first time in the club's history, qualifying to the competition as the 2014 Malaysian champions. They defeated Pahang 2–0 to win the trophy. The club made their debut in the AFC Cup on 24 February 2015 with a 4–1 win over East Bengal in the first game of the group stage. In late April 2015, the head coach Bojan Hodak left the club and was replaced by Roberto Carlos Mario Gómez. As the new head coach, he was also given the authority to revamp youth development programmes in JDT, especially its development squads, from JDT II to JDT V.

2015 AFC Cup final starting lineup

On 12 July 2015, an announcement was made that Tunku Ismail Ibni Sultan Ibrahim left his post as president of the Johor FA; instead, he would still serve in his capacity as the Royal Patron of Johor FA. Dato' Haji Ismail bin Karim, State Secretary of Johor, was appointed as his replacement with immediate effect. In August 2015, JDT defended the Malaysia Super League title, becoming the national champions for the second year in a row. On 31 October 2015, JDT became the first Malaysian team to reach the final of the AFC Cup. In the final, held in Dushanbe, Tajikistan, they defeated the home side FC Istiklol 1–0 with a goal scored by Leandro Velázquez. As a result, JDT became the first club from Southeast Asia to win the competition.

In the opener of the 2016 season, JDT edged Selangor in a 7–6 penalty shoot-out win, successfully defending the Piala Sumbangsih title. In the same season, JDT clinched their first-ever Malaysia FA Cup title after staging a comeback 2–1 win over PKNS FC. It was the first time a club side lifted the trophy since its inception in 1990. JDT secured their third consecutive league title on Match Day 20 of the 2016 season with a 3–0 win over Terengganu. The club became the first team to win three consecutive league titles – a feat never achieved before by any team since the inception of the national league championship in 1982. Also in the 2016 season, JDT managed to end the league undefeated, thus becoming the first ever club in Malaysia to have done so.

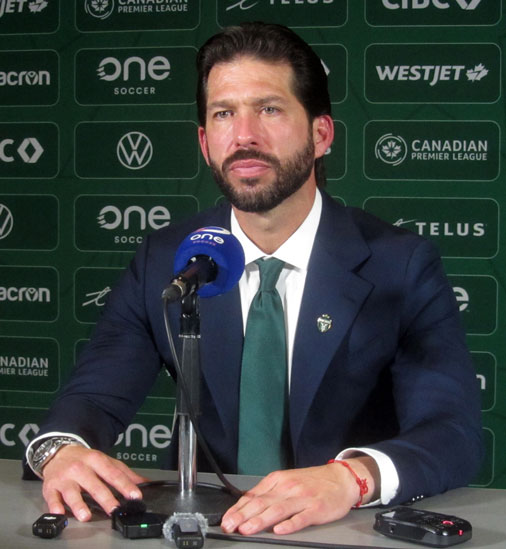
Benjamín Mora is one of the most successful managers in Johor Darul Ta'zim history

On 18 January 2017, JDT announced that they had parted their ways with Mario Gómez barely two days before the season opener. The club promoted Mexican Benjamín Mora from JDT II to coach the squad for the 2017 season. On 21 January 2017, despite leading 1–0 at half-time, JDT were denied a third Piala Sumbangsih in a row after losing 5–4 in the penalty shoot-out to Kedah. In the 2017 AFC Champions League qualifying play-off, JDT reached the play-off round for the first time in their history, after eliminating Bangkok United in the second preliminary round after penalties. In the play-off round, JDT lost 3–0 to the Japanese side Gamba Osaka. Following on from that, Perak defeated JDT 2–1 and ended the club's record unbeaten streak of 26 league matches dating back to the opening fixture of the 2016 season.

During the 2017 mid-season break, JDT demoted Mora back into his previous position as the second team's head coach. The club appointed Portuguese Ulisses Morais as the new manager of the main squad. Morais led the team to its fourth consecutive league title; with JDT confirmed to have clinched the 2017 Super League title on 5 August 2017 with three games remaining.

During JDT Congress held in early October 2017, Tunku Ismail made several major moves in the state of Johor. All race-based football associations in the state were disbanded. However these teams will be allowed to continue participating as football clubs in the state competitions. As for the club, major restructuring of the organisation were made to ensure future success in both off and on-the-pitch. Amongst them were the appointment of Martín Hugo Prest as the new Sporting Director, meanwhile the previous Sporting Director, Alistair Edwards was reassigned as the club's Technical Director, responsible for all developmental teams including JDT II, with the team playing in the Malaysia Premier League as a developmental team instead of a feeder club.

After completing the league fixtures in late October 2017, JDT contested in the Malaysia Cup final against Kedah, the 2017 Malaysia FA Cup winners, whom they met earlier in the season opener in January. Playing in front of 80,000 fans at the Shah Alam Stadium, JDT seized the title from the "Red Eagles" with a 2–0 victory and clinched a double in the 2017 season.

In 2018, JDT were eliminated in the quarter-finals of the 2018 Malaysia FA Cup after losing to Pahang 3–0 on aggregate. JDT also failed to defend their Malaysia Cup title, losing to Terengganu in the semi-finals. During the same season, Johor won their fifth consecutive league title.

In 2019, Johor Darul Ta'zim returned to the AFC Champions League, marking their return to Asia's premier club competition for the first time since their previous appearance in 1996. After qualifying, JDT became the first Malaysian club to compete in the tournament's group stage. The club recorded a 1–0 victory over reigning champions Kashima Antlers at Larkin Stadium. Domestically, JDT also won the 2019 Malaysia Cup with a 3–0 victory over Kedah in the final, while retaining the Malaysia Super League title.

In 2020, the club moved into the newly built Sultan Ibrahim Stadium. Despite the season being shortened due to the COVID-19 pandemic, JDT finished undefeated to secure their seventh consecutive league title. However, their continental campaign was cut short when travel restrictions imposed by the Malaysian government prevented the club from traveling to Qatar for the centralized matches, forcing them to withdraw from the 2020 AFC Champions League.

=== 2021: Domestic dominance and the Malaysia Cup "wake-up call" ===
In 2021, Johor Darul Ta'zim secured their eighth consecutive Malaysia Super League title. However, their domestic campaign ended on a bitter note when they suffered a shocking 2–0 defeat to Kuala Lumpur City in the 2021 Malaysia Cup final. Club owner Tunku Ismail Sultan Ibrahim described the defeat as a "wake-up call", stating that the team had become "too comfortable and overconfident" after years of success. The defeat prompted Tunku Ismail to reverse his initial plans to take a hiatus from football management, vowing instead to aggressively restructure and reinvest in the squad for the subsequent seasons.

=== The Dominance Era (2022–present) ===
Following the 2021 Malaysia Cup defeat, Johor Darul Ta'zim underwent a squad restructuring. The club parted ways with several long-serving players and technical staff while introducing new international players to strengthen the squad.

This rebuild produced immediate results in 2022. Under Benjamin Mora and later Héctor Bidoglio, JDT achieved a continental milestone by becoming the first Malaysian club to qualify for the AFC Champions League round of 16, topping a group that included Kawasaki Frontale and Ulsan Hyundai. Domestically, the team won all four domestic competitions, securing the club's first domestic quadruple consisting of Malaysia Super League, Malaysia FA Cup, Malaysia Cup and Malaysia Charity Shield.

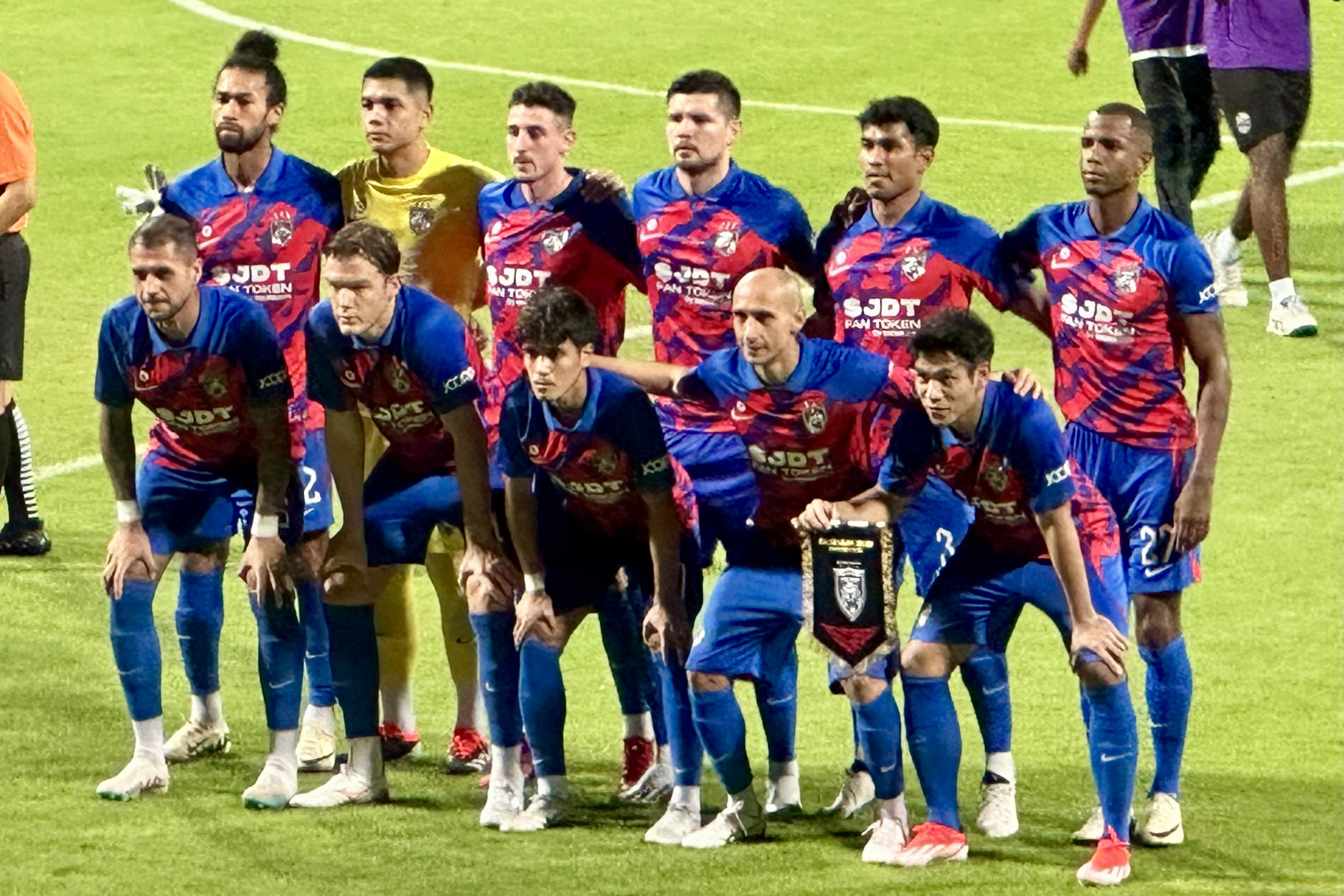
Johor Darul Ta'zim squad during the 2023 season

In 2023, under the stewardship of Esteban Solari, JDT continued their success. The club retained their domestic success by capturing a second consecutive domestic quadruple. During this season, they broke national records by scoring 100 league goals in a single season and winning the Super League title with an unprecedented fifteen-point margin.

The dominance continued into the rebranded 2024–25 season when Bidoglio returned for his second stint as head coach. Under his guidance, JDT secured a third consecutive domestic quadruple while remaining unbeaten in all domestic competitions.

By the conclusion of the 2025–26 season, JDT continued their domestic success while recording their best continental performance to date. Domestically, the club clinched a twelfth consecutive Malaysia Super League title and completed a fourth consecutive domestic quadruple. Remarkably, JDT extended a domestic league unbeaten streak to 108 matches, equaling a world record. They also set a new league scoring record with 117 goals, which included a 14–1 victory over Kelantan The Real Warriors. On the continental stage, JDT reached the quarter-finals of the AFC Champions League Elite, securing victories over Japanese clubs Vissel Kobe and Sanfrecce Hiroshima.

== Stadium ==
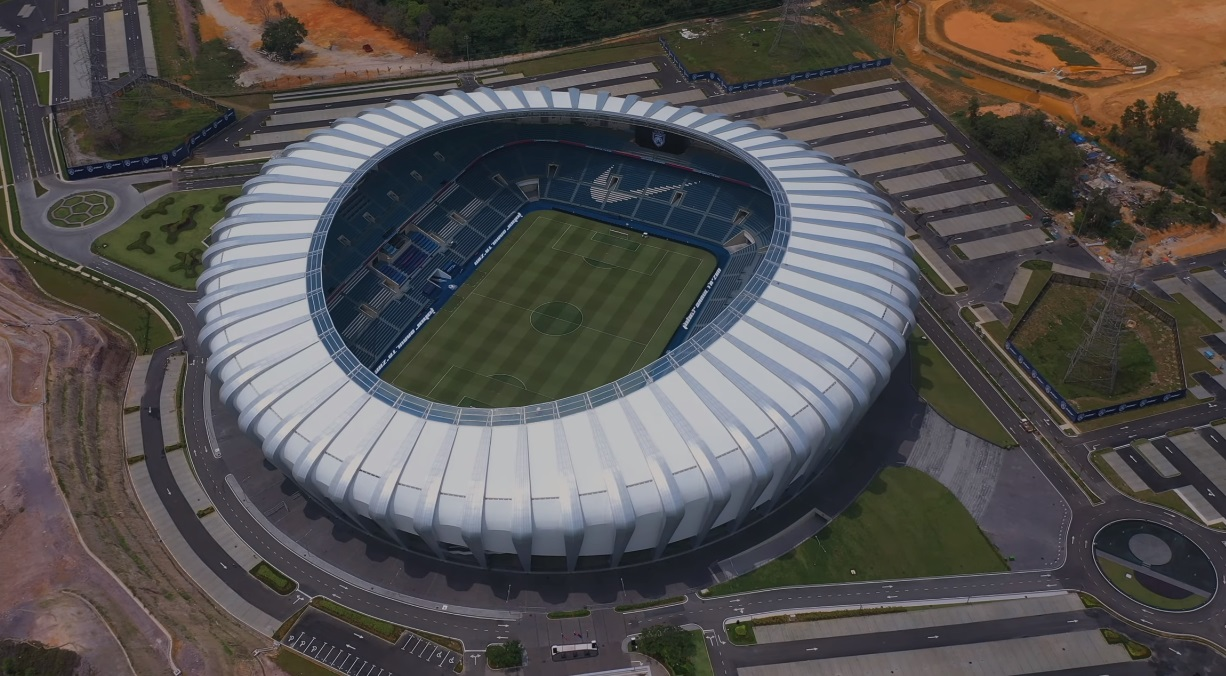
Aerial view of Sultan Ibrahim Stadium

Throughout its history, the club has played at three main home grounds.

=== Current ground ===
The Sultan Ibrahim Stadium was completed in January 2020 and is located within the vicinity of JDT Sports City. The club's new headquarters are part of the stadium complex. The stadium has a capacity for 40,000 spectators and was constructed by Country Garden Pacificview at the cost of MYR 200 million. It is named after the state's ruler, Ibrahim Iskandar of Johor.

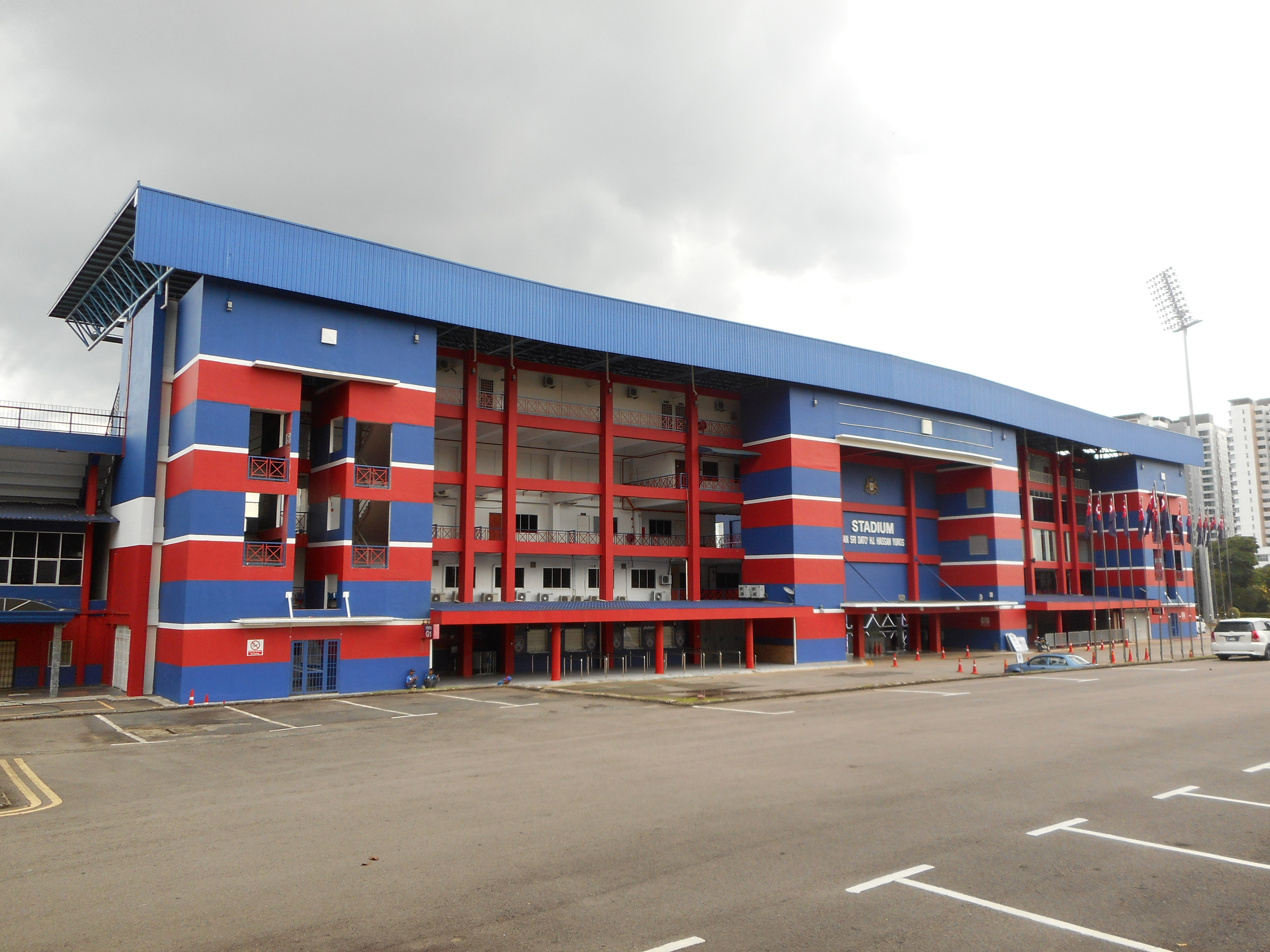
Larkin Stadium

=== Past grounds ===
The club's roots were established at the Pasir Gudang Corporation Stadium, which served as the home ground for Johor FC before the club rebranded as Johor Darul Ta'zim in 2013.

Between 2013 and 2019, Johor Darul Ta'zim played their home games at Tan Sri Dato' Haji Hassan Yunos Stadium, also known as Larkin Stadium. The stadium was originally built in 1964, with a capacity of 15,000 spectators. The stadium is named after the former Menteri Besar of Johor, Tan Sri Dato Hj. Hassan Yunus. In 1991, the stadium's capacity was doubled following extensive renovations. An athletics track, floodlight masts and media infrastructure were added to allow the ground to host major events. The stadium was also used for the FIFA U-20 World Cup and Sukma Games.

== Training facilities and infrastructure ==
=== Dato' Suleiman Mohd Noor Indoor Training Centre (Johor Bahru, Johor) ===
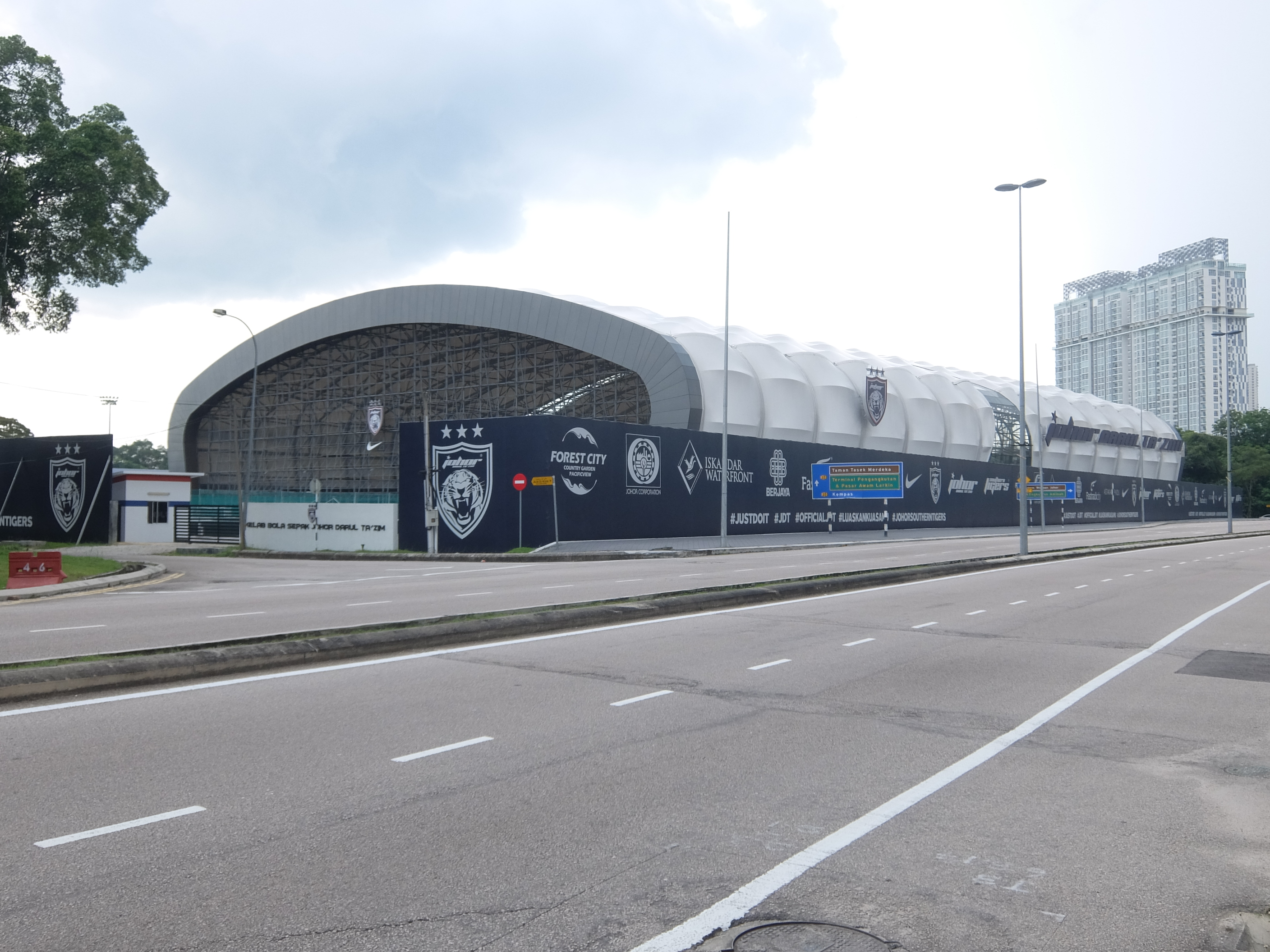
Dato' Suleiman Mohd Noor Indoor Training Centre

Padang Sri Gelam is the training facility for Johor Darul Ta'zim, located at Johor Bahru, Johor. Besides the indoor synthetic field measuring 16 x 109.2 metres, the building comes with the gym equipment, a swimming pool, and ice baths. The project is in line with the vision of Tunku Ismail, who wants international-level training equipment for the players and to help those who are injured to recover faster.

After its design plans were approved on 24 December 2014, the groundbreaking ceremony of the all-weather training arena was held on 1 January 2015, attended by Tunku Aminah.

The development of the RM15 million indoor facility was sponsored by Iskandar Waterfront Holdings (IWH) under its Corporate Social Responsibility (CSR) programme. The 0.8ha indoor facility were designed and built according to the requirements and specifications set by FIFA, the world's football governing body.

After its completion, it was named the Dato Suleiman Mohd Noor Indoor Training Centre as a special recognition and appreciation for his contribution as the "Father of Johorean Football" on 23 February 2016. It was officially opened on 21 April 2016.

=== Youth development ===
To demonstrate his ideas and commitment to youth development in the state, Tunku Ismail has entered into partnerships and built ties with various football individuals all over the world. To date, JDT has developed strategic partnership and collaborations with Borussia Dortmund (Germany), Hokkaido Consadole Sapporo (Japan), and Valencia (Spain). Besides signing new young players for development, the club has been organising competitive tournaments across all age groups in the districts of Johor.

In mid-January 2017, the club revealed that they have signed a three-year coaching and player development partnership with Valencia. The partnership was introduced to oversee the implementation of a long-term player development plan for JDT. This plan is based on Valencia Academy's methodologies and development philosophies, adapted to JDT's needs and context.

==== JDT Football Academy (Kulai, Johor) ====
As of December 2015, the club is in the process of building a brand new youth academy with up to 15 football pitches and modern facilities, designed in collaboration with Borussia Dortmund, who have entered into a partnership with JDT. The development of the 40-hectare academy in Kulai will be focusing to develop local youth talents from the grassroots level and promote JDT's regional presence.

==== European Training Centre (Spain) ====
As part of JDT's Youth Development Plan, the club has announced its plan to build a pre-season training facility in Spain on 21 June 2016. The facility will be used to accommodate JDT's young players for pre-season training, as well as for lodging of youth JDT players who will be on playing stints in Spain.

A delegation of JDT's officials has been sent to Spain to scout for prospective sites for the development of this facility. The site will either be in the region of Valencia or Barcelona.

=== JDT Sports City ===
In January 2016, as part of Tunku Ismail's strategic plan to develop the state's football and other programmes, the club announced the development of JDT Sports City. The Johor state government had provided a 70-acre (28.3 hectares) plot of land for the project in Iskandar Puteri, Johor. Under its blueprint, the sports complex will house a new stadium and other sporting facilities such as a hotel, apartments, and a shopping mall.

== Team image ==
=== Club ownership ===
On the eve of the 2016 season, JDT officially came under the ownership of Tunku Ismail in a statement released by Johor FA dated 10 January 2016. It further clarified that JDT were now turned into a full-fledged professional outfit, as a separate entity from the Johor FA which organises the overall football development programme in the state. As the JDT owner, Tunku Ismail is directly involved in the decision-making process and club management, compared to his previous role as the Royal Patron of Johor FA, when he provided directions and counsel. A day later, former Johor striker who was a key member of the historic double-winning team of 1991, Alistair Edwards was appointed as JDT's Sporting Director to assist Tunku Ismail. The move was seen as part of the privatisation process and a strategic initiative on how Malaysia football clubs should be run and managed professionally including the youth development in the region.

Shortly after, on 12 January 2016, the Sultan of Johor, Sultan Ibrahim Almarhum Sultan Iskandar decided to give RM50 million as a reward to the club. After a successful 2015 season, when the club won the Super League, the Piala Sumbangsih, and the AFC Cup, Sultan Ibrahim made the decision to contribute RM50 million as he was satisfied with how football in the state had united the citizens of Johor and put the state's name on the map.

In an interview published on the club's social media in early December 2016, the majority shareholder in the club is Tunku Ismail himself, who holds 70% of the club.

As part of the restructuring process, the club made an unexpected announcement by naming Luciano Figueroa as the new Sporting Director. His responsibility and focus was on the first team and to assist the head coach, Ulisses Morais. Meanwhile, the previous Sporting Director, Alistair Edwards was reassigned as the new Technical Director and would be responsible to oversee all JDT development and grassroot programmes.

=== Appointment of Tunku Tun Aminah as JDT's President ===
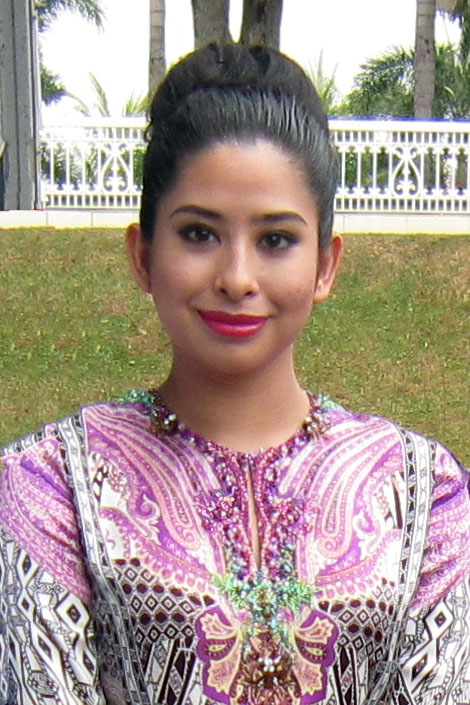
Tunku Aminah, President of Johor Darul Ta'zim.

On 27 July 2016, Tunku Tun Aminah binti Sultan Ibrahim, the sister of Tunku Ismail Sultan Ibrahim, has been appointed as the President of Johor DT. Besides focusing on the youth development and attracting youth into sporting activities and active lifestyles, she is also considering an establishment of a JDT women's football team in the near future.

=== JDT Foundation ===
The JDT foundation was registered on 9 August 2016. The mission behind the formation of the foundation is to collect funds and distribute aids to the development of the club.

Just days before the 2016 Malaysia FA Cup final, the club announced JDT Foundation (Malay: Yayasan JDT), was launched officially in September 2016 as the platform for JDT supporters to be more involved with the team in terms of the team's future and the development of JDT football programmes. JDT Foundation Board of Trustees Chairman Datuk Hasni Mohammad said that it would give opportunity for JDT fans to actually have a "say" in the football club through proper ownership.

With the establishment of the JDT Foundation, fans can become shareholders of the club and send representatives to have meetings with the club officials to understand the club's direction and plans including its monthly financial statement which was planned to be released informing them on all expenditures and its costs. After several postponements, JDT Foundation is slated to be launched in mid January 2017.

The foundation's Membership Card launch was held at the Persada International Convention Centre in Johor Bahru on 7 December 2016.

== Supporters ==
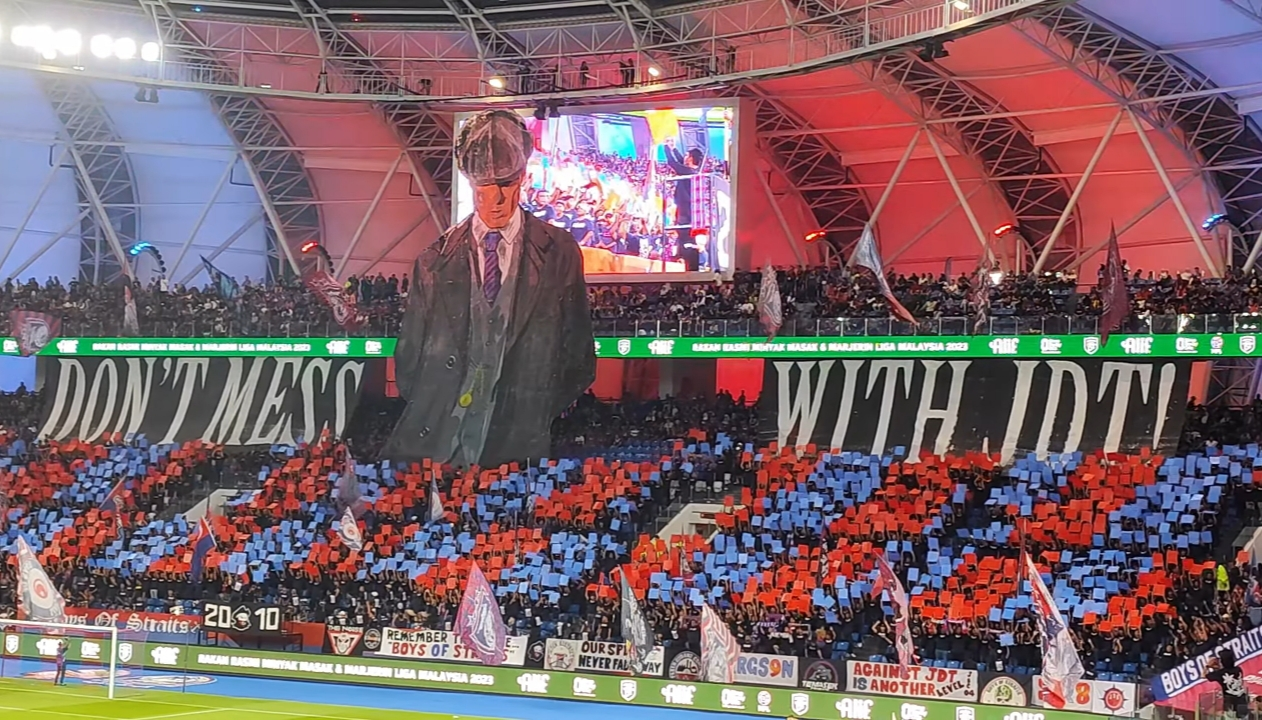
Johor Darul Ta'zim supporters

In 2022, Johor Darul Ta'zim had five million followers on social media, the highest among Malaysian sports clubs. Boys of Straits (formerly known as Southern Trooper) is the name of the official supporters of the club. The main colours of the supporters are usually blue with a red scarf and banners, like the team's kits colours. The supporters always bring drums and large colorful flags to the stadiums.

Known for their constant singing, drumming, and rallying team throughout a match, they have consistently built-up the spirit of togetherness and camaraderie among the fans of the club's home and away matches. It caught the attention of Hong Kong media during the 2016 AFC Cup quarter-final match with South China AA when they singled out South China's captain Chan Wai Ho for verbal abuse during the second leg of the tie.

Inter Johor Firm (IJF) was formed to support Johor Darul Ta'zim. An early goal of establishing the IJF was to protect JDT fans at away matches. After the IJF was implicated with a football hooliganism scandal, JDT president officially banned the group from entering all home and away matches.

== Rivalries ==
=== Sri Pahang ===
The rivalry with Sri Pahang began to develop in 2013 after a 3–2 loss in the club's debut in the Malaysia Super League, and an event of overcrowding and crowd trouble during the Malaysia FA Cup semi-final second leg match at Darul Makmur Stadium on 28 May 2013.

Since then, it has developed into a tense competition between both sides. It has also created a great atmosphere for supporters and fans of both sides.

=== Southern Derby ===
The rivalry between Johor Darul Ta'zim and two clubs from neighboring states, Melaka United and Negeri Sembilan, is collectively known as the Southern Derby (Derbi Selatan). The rivalry with Melaka United intensified following Melaka's return to the top flight in 2017, leading to a surge in attendance whenever the two sides met. The clash represents the historical link and sporting competition between the two neighboring territories.

The rivalry with Negeri Sembilan is one of the most intense regional fixtures, peaking between 2011 and 2013. During this era, matches were characterized by high-tension atmospheres and fierce competition as both clubs fought for dominance in the Malaysia Super League and Malaysia Cup.

== Identity ==
=== Crest ===
The club crest is derived from the Johor State Council coat of arms, although all that remains of it on the current crest is the part of the tiger's head.

In 2013, JDT adopted a new logo, featuring a more ferocious looking tiger and a darker colour scheme.

Logo of Johor FC, used between 1972 and 2012.

In 2013, a tiger was added to the crest.

=== Kits ===
From the 1970s to 2012, the JDT team kit was manufactured by various companies including Adidas, Kappa, Joma, and Jking.

In the 2014 season, JDT became the first Malaysian club to have Nike as their official kit sponsor. In November 2014, Nike Malaysia created a new special kit for their 2015 AFC Champions League qualifying play-off campaign.

On the eve of the 2016 season, JDT signed a contract with Adidas. The new kits were officially unveiled with a commercial video featuring JDT footballers inside the Senai International Airport terminal. The jerseys featured three different designs in red, white and blue, representing the colours of the Johor state flag.

In November 2016, JDT announced that they have signed a three-year deal with Nike, starting with the 2017 season. It was the biggest kit sponsorship ever signed by a Malaysian club. The three-year cooperation encompassed all the teams under JDT, namely main squad, JDT II, JDT III, and JDT IV. The official kit was unveiled on 12 January 2017.

Year(s)	Kit manufacturer
1994	Le Coq Sportif
1995–1997	Adidas
1998–2010	Jking
2011	Kika
2012	Joma
2013	Kappa
2014–2015	Nike
2016	Adidas
2017–present	Nike

== Players ==
=== Current squad ===
As of 31 August 2026

Note: Flags indicate national team as defined under FIFA eligibility rules; some limited exceptions apply. Players may hold more than one non-FIFA nationality.

No.	Pos.	Nation	Player
1	GK	ESP	Christian Abad
2	DF	MAS	Matthew Davies
3	DF	MAS	Shahrul Saad
4	MF	MAS	Afiq Fazail
5	DF	ESP	Antonio Glauder
6	MF	MAS	Hong Wan
7	FW	IRI	Shahab Zahedi
8	MF	NED	Hector Hevel
9	FW	MAS	Bérgson
10	MF	MAS	Arif Aiman
11	FW	BRA	Jairo
12	MF	MAS	Stuart Wilkin
14	DF	MAS	Shane Lowry
15	DF	MAS	Feroz Baharudin
16	GK	MAS	Syihan Hazmi
17	DF	ESP	Jon Irazábal
18	MF	POR	Nené
19	MF	ESP	Stoichkov
20	DF	BRA	Dani Bolt
21	MF	SLO	Dejan Petrovič

No.	Pos.	Nation	Player
22	DF	MAS	La'Vere Corbin-Ong
23	DF	AZE	Eddy Israfilov
24	MF	ESP	Óscar Arribas
25	FW	BRA	João Figueiredo
26	MF	MAS	Brad Tapp
27	DF	ESP	Gabriel Palmero
28	MF	ESP	Nacho Méndez
29	DF	GEQ	Carlos Akapo
30	MF	MAS	Natxo Insa
33	DF	ARG	Jonathan Silva
41	MF	MAS	Syamer Kutty
47	MF	ESP	Ager Aketxe
58	GK	ESP	Andoni Zubiaurre
77	MF	ESP	Matías Nahuel
81	DF	COL	Kevin Medina
88	MF	MAS	Manuel Hidalgo
91	DF	MAS	Syahmi Safari
95	MF	BRA	Marcos Guilherme
97	FW	BRA	Yago

=== Award winners ===
- Most Valuable Player winners
  - (Malaysia) Safiq Rahim (2015)
  - (Malaysia) Safawi Rasid (2018, 2019)
  - (Malaysia) Arif Aiman (2021, 2022, 2023, 2024–25)
  - (Malaysia) Afiq Fazail (2025–26)
- Malaysia Super League Golden Boot winners
  - (Argentina) Jorge Pereyra Díaz (2016)
  - (Lebanon) Mohamad Ghaddar (2017)
  - (Brazil) Bérgson (2022, 2024–25, 2025–26)

== Development squads ==
As part of the club's acquisition and subsequent rebranding in 2012, Tunku Ismail Sultan Ibrahim, the Johor Football Association's President, took the decision to rename all the club's teams using the same nomenclature. In addition, Roman numerals were used to denote each team's hierarchy in the club.

In early 2014, the Football Association of Malaysia approved Johor FA's application and officially registered all the club's teams to Johor Darul Ta'zim.

- JDT II (reserve squad)
- JDT III (under-21 squad)
- JDT IV (under-19 squad)

== Honours ==
Johor Darul Ta'zim's honours
Type	Honour	Titles	Seasons
Domestic	Malaysia Super League	12	2014, 2015, 2016, 2017, 2018, 2019, 2020, 2021, 2022, 2023, 2024–25, 2025–26
Domestic	Malaysia Premier League	1	2001
Domestic	Malaysia FAM League	2	1994, 1995
Domestic	Malaysia Cup	6	2017, 2019, 2022, 2023, 2024–25, 2025–26
Domestic	Malaysia FA Cup	5	2016, 2022, 2023, 2024, 2025
Domestic	Malaysian Charity Shield	11	2015, 2016, 2018, 2019, 2020, 2021, 2022, 2023, 2024, 2025, 2026
Continental	AFC Cup	1	2015

- record or shared record

=== Doubles and Trebles ===
- Doubles
  - Malaysia Super League and Malaysia Cup: 2017, 2019, 2022, (Note: As part of the treble) 2023, 2024–25, 2025–26
  - Malaysia Super League and Malaysia FA Cup: 2016, 2022, 2023, 2024–25, 2025–26
  - Malaysia Super League and AFC Cup: 2015
- Trebles
  - Malaysia Super League, Malaysia Cup and Malaysia FA Cup: 2022, 2023, 2024–25, 2025–26

== Season-by-season records ==
Key

First place or winners Second place or runners-up Promoted Relegated

Season	League									Cup		
Season	Division	Pld	W	D	L	F	A	Pts	Pos	Charity Shield	Malaysia Cup	FA Cup
1998	Perdana 2	14	4	4	6	19	24	16	5th	—	—	Second round
1999	Perdana 2	18	9	5 (Note: Draws were followed by penalty shoot-outs for an additional point. Johor have won once and lost four times in a penalty shoot-outs.)	4	24	17	33	3rd	—	—	First round
2000	Perdana 2	18	5	6	7	16	18	21	7th	—	Quarter-finals	Second round
2001	Perdana 2	22	14	5	3	42	20	47	1st	—	Group stage	Quarter-finals
2002	Perdana 1	26	12	5	9	37	27	41	6th	—	Group stage	Second round
2003	Perdana 1	24	10	4	10	42	32	34	7th	—	Group stage	Quarter-finals
2004	Premier League	24	14	5	5	43	25	47	3rd	—	Group stage	Quarter-finals
2005	Premier League	21	10	6	5	27	16	36	4th	—	Group stage	First round
2005–06	Premier League	21	9	8	4	38	27	35	3rd	—	Group stage	First round
2006–07	Super League	24	11	6	7	35	26	39	6th	—	Group stage	Second round
2007–08	Super League	24	14	4	6	40	27	46	3rd	—	Semi-finals	First round
2009	Super League	26	15	3	8	53	27	48	4th	—	Quarter-finals	First round
2010	Super League	26	13	4	9	44	29	43	4th	—	Semi-finals	First round
2011	Super League	26	8	10	8	26	28	34	7th	—	Group stage	Second round
2012	Super League	26	10	5	11	29	31	35	9th	—	Quarter-finals	Quarter-finals
2013	Super League	22	11	7	4	32	26	40	3rd	—	Quarter-finals	Runners-up
2014	Super League	22	13	5	4	39	22	44	1st	—	Runners-up	Semi-finals
2015	Super League	22	14	4	4	36	18	46	1st	Winners	Quarter-finals	First round
2016	Super League	22	18	4	0	56	14	58	1st	Winners	Group stage	Winners
2017	Super League	22	15	4	3	50	19	49	1st	Runners-up	Winners	Quarter-finals
2018	Super League	22	19	2	1	47	9	59	1st	Winners	Semi-finals	Quarter-finals
2019	Super League	22	16	5	1	49	19	53	1st	Winners	Winners	Third round
2020	Super League	11	9	2	0	33	8	29	1st	Winners	Cancelled (Note: Cancelled due to the COVID-19 pandemic.)	
2021	Super League	22	18	3	1	50	9	57	1st	Winners	Runners-up	Cancelled
2022	Super League	22	17	5	0	61	12	56	1st	Winners	Winners	Winners
2023	Super League	26	25	1	0	100	7	76	1st	Winners	Winners	Winners
2024–25	Super League	24	23	1	0	90	8	70	1st	Winners	Winners	Winners
2025–26	Super League	24	23	1	0	117	10	70	1st	Winners	Winners	Winners

== Continental record ==
- Asian Club Championship
  1996–97: Second round
- AFC Champions League
  2015: Preliminary round 2
  2016: Preliminary round 2
  2017: Play-off round
  2018: Preliminary round 2
  2019: Group stage
  2020: Withdrew
  2021: Group stage
  2022: Round of 16
  2023–24: Group stage
- AFC Champions League Elite
  2024–25: Round of 16
  2025–26: Quarter-final
  2026–27: To be decided
- AFC Cup
  2009: Group stage
  2015: Winners
  2016: Semi-final
  2017: ASEAN Zonal Semi-final
  2018: Group stage

=== List of matches ===
All results list Johor's goal tally first.

Season	Competition	Round	Club	Home	Away	Aggregate
1996–97	Asian Club Championship	First round	(Vietnam) Cong An Ho Chi Minh	1–1 (a.e.t.)	1–0	2–1
1996–97	Asian Club Championship	Second round	(Japan) Yokohama Marinos	1–1	0–2	1–3
2009	AFC Cup	Group F	(Maldives) VB Sports Club	0–0	0–2	4th out of 4
2009	AFC Cup	Group F	(Indonesia) PSMS Medan	0–1	1–3	4th out of 4
2009	AFC Cup	Group F	(Hong Kong) South China	1–4	0–2	4th out of 4
2015	AFC Champions League	Preliminary round 1	(India) Bengaluru FC	2–1 (a.e.t.)	—N/a	—N/a
2015	AFC Champions League	Preliminary round 2	(Thailand) Bangkok Glass	—N/a	0–3	—N/a
2015	AFC Cup	Group F	(India) East Bengal	4–1	1–0	1st out of 4
2015	AFC Cup	Group F	(Singapore) Balestier Khalsa	3–0	1–0	1st out of 4
2015	AFC Cup	Group F	(Hong Kong) Kitchee	2–0	0–2	1st out of 4
2015	AFC Cup	Round of 16	(Myanmar) Ayeyawady United	5–0	—N/a	—N/a
2015	AFC Cup	Quarter-final	(Hong Kong) South China	1–1	3–1	4–2
2015	AFC Cup	Semi-final	(Kuwait) Al-Qadsia	Cancelled	1–3	w/o
2015	AFC Cup	Final	(Tajikistan) Istiklol	—N/a	1–0	—N/a
2016	AFC Champions League	Preliminary round 2	(Thailand) Muangthong United	—N/a	0–0 (a.e.t.) (0–3 p)	—N/a
2016	AFC Cup	Group H	(Myanmar) Ayeyawady United	8–1	2–1	1st out of 4
2016	AFC Cup	Group H	(India) Bengaluru FC	3–0	1–0	1st out of 4
2016	AFC Cup	Group H	(Laos) Lao Toyota	3–0	4–1	1st out of 4
2016	AFC Cup	Round of 16	(Philippines) Kaya	—N/a	7–2	—N/a
2016	AFC Cup	Quarter-final	(Hong Kong) South China	2–1	1–1	3–2
2016	AFC Cup	Semi-final	(India) Bengaluru FC	1–1	1–3	2–4
2017	AFC Champions League	Preliminary round 2	(Thailand) Bangkok United	—N/a	1–1 (a.e.t.) (5–4 p)	—N/a
2017	AFC Champions League	Play-off round	(Japan) Gamba Osaka	—N/a	0–3	—N/a
2017	AFC Cup	Group F	(Cambodia) Boeung Ket Angkor	3–0	3–0	2nd out of 4
2017	AFC Cup	Group F	(Myanmar) Magwe	3–1	1–1	2nd out of 4
2017	AFC Cup	Group F	(Philippines) Global Cebu	4–0	2–3	2nd out of 4
2017	AFC Cup	ASEAN Zonal Semi-final	(Philippines) Ceres Negros	3–2	1–2	4–4 (a)
2018	AFC Champions League	Preliminary round 2	(Thailand) Muangthong United	2–5		
2018	AFC Cup	Group H	(Indonesia) Persija Jakarta	3–0	0–4	3rd out of 4
2018	AFC Cup	Group H	(Vietnam) Sông Lam Nghệ An	3–2	0–2	3rd out of 4
2018	AFC Cup	Group H	(Singapore) Tampines Rovers	2–1	0–0	3rd out of 4
2019	AFC Champions League	Group E	(Japan) Kashima Antlers	1–0	1–2	4th out of 4
2019	AFC Champions League	Group E	(South Korea) Gyeongnam FC	1–1	0–2	4th out of 4
2019	AFC Champions League	Group E	(China) Shandong Luneng	0–1	1–2	4th out of 4
2020	AFC Champions League (Note: The season was postponed in March 2020 due to the COVID-19 pandemic. When the competition resumed in November, Johor failed to obtain travel permission from the Malaysian government and did not play the remaining games at a neutral venue in Doha, Qatar, and all Johor's results were voided by the AFC.)	Group G	(Japan) Vissel Kobe	Cancelled	1–5 (voided)	Withdrew
2020	AFC Champions League	Group G	(South Korea) Suwon Samsung Bluewings	2–1 (voided)	Cancelled	Withdrew
2020	AFC Champions League	Group G	(China) Guangzhou Evergrande	Cancelled		Withdrew
2021	AFC Champions League	Group G (Note: All group stage matches took place at the Rajamangala Stadium in Bangkok, Thailand.)	(Japan) Nagoya Grampus	0–1	1–2	3rd out of 4
2021	AFC Champions League	Group G	(Thailand) Ratchaburi Mitr Phol	0–0	1–0	3rd out of 4
2021	AFC Champions League	Group G	(South Korea) Pohang Steelers	0–2	1–4	3rd out of 4
2022	AFC Champions League	Group I (Note: All group stage matches took place in Johor Bahru, Malaysia.)	(China) Guangzhou	5–0	2–0	1st out of 4
2022	AFC Champions League	Group I	(South Korea) Ulsan Hyundai	2–1	2–1	1st out of 4
2022	AFC Champions League	Group I	(Japan) Kawasaki Frontale	0–5	0–0	1st out of 4
2022	AFC Champions League	Round of 16	(Japan) Urawa Red Diamonds	0–5		
2023–24	AFC Champions League	Group I	(Japan) Kawasaki Frontale	0–1	0–5	3rd out of 4
2023–24	AFC Champions League	Group I	(Thailand) BG Pathum United	4–1	4–2	3rd out of 4
2023–24	AFC Champions League	Group I	(South Korea) Ulsan Hyundai	2–1	1–3	3rd out of 4
2024–25	AFC Champions League Elite	League stage	(China) Shanghai Port	—N/a	2–2	3rd out of 12
2024–25	AFC Champions League Elite	League stage	(China) Shanghai Shenhua	3–0	—N/a	3rd out of 12
2024–25	AFC Champions League Elite	League stage	(South Korea) Gwangju FC	—N/a	1–3	3rd out of 12
2024–25	AFC Champions League Elite	League stage	(South Korea) Ulsan HD	3–0	—N/a	3rd out of 12
2024–25	AFC Champions League Elite	League stage	(China) Shandong Taishan	—N/a	0–1 (voided)	3rd out of 12
2024–25	AFC Champions League Elite	League stage	(Thailand) Buriram United	0–0	—N/a	3rd out of 12
2024–25	AFC Champions League Elite	League stage	(Australia) Central Coast Mariners	—N/a	2–1	3rd out of 12
2024–25	AFC Champions League Elite	League stage	(South Korea) Pohang Steelers	5–2	—N/a	3rd out of 12
2024–25	AFC Champions League Elite	Round of 16	(Thailand) Buriram United	0–1	0–0	0–1
2025–26	AFC Champions League Elite	League stage	(Thailand) Buriram United	—N/a	1–2	6th out of 12
2025–26	AFC Champions League Elite	League stage	(Japan) Machida Zelvia	0–0	—N/a	6th out of 12
2025–26	AFC Champions League Elite	League stage	(China) Chengdu Rongcheng	—N/a	2–0	6th out of 12
2025–26	AFC Champions League Elite	League stage	(China) Shanghai Shenhua	3–1	—N/a	6th out of 12
2025–26	AFC Champions League Elite	League stage	(Australia) Melbourne City	—N/a	0–2	6th out of 12
2025–26	AFC Champions League Elite	League stage	(China) Shanghai Port	0–0	—N/a	6th out of 12
2025–26	AFC Champions League Elite	League stage	(Japan) Sanfrecce Hiroshima	—N/a	1–2	6th out of 12
2025–26	AFC Champions League Elite	League stage	(Japan) Vissel Kobe	1–0	—N/a	6th out of 12
2025–26	AFC Champions League Elite	Round of 16	(Japan) Sanfrecce Hiroshima	3–1	0–1	3–2
2025–26	AFC Champions League Elite	Quarter-final	(Saudi Arabia) Al-Ahli	1–2		
2026–27	AFC Champions League Elite	League stage	(Thailand) Buriram United	1–1	—N/a	
2026–27	AFC Champions League Elite	League stage	(South Korea) Pohang Steelers	—N/a	2–0	
2026–27	AFC Champions League Elite	League stage	(Thailand) Port	3–0	—N/a	
2026–27	AFC Champions League Elite	League stage	(South Korea) Jeonbuk Hyundai Motors	—N/a	0–2	
2026–27	AFC Champions League Elite	League stage	(Thailand) Ratchaburi	—N/a		
2026–27	AFC Champions League Elite	League stage	(South Korea) Daejeon Hana Citizen		—N/a	
2026–27	AFC Champions League Elite	League stage	(Australia) Newcastle Jets	—N/a		
2026–27	AFC Champions League Elite	League stage	(Vietnam) Công An Hà Nội		—N/a	

== Management and coaching staff ==
Position	Name
Owner	(Malaysia) Tunku Ismail Idris
President	(Malaysia) Tunku Aminah Maimunah Iskandariah
Sporting director	(Argentina) Martín Prest
Chief executive officer	(Spain) Luis García
Chief operating officer & technical director	(Australia) Alistair Edwards
Head coach	(Spain) Xisco Muñoz
Assistant head coach	(Argentina) Fernando Ariel Bacci
Assistant coaches	(Malaysia) Mohd Hamzani Omar
Assistant coaches	(Argentina) Ramiro Gonzalez
Goalkeeper coach	(Spain) Jon Elorza
Fitness coaches	(Spain) Jorge Álvarez
Fitness coaches	(Argentina) Alexis Cruz Gasparini
Asst. fitness coach	(Malaysia) Yusree Zainuddin
Team doctor	(Malaysia) Sujindran Narasamy
Physiotherapists	(Spain) Enrique Portaz Castaño
Physiotherapists	(Spain) Aitor Abal González
Physiotherapists	(Spain) Raúl Quintana Cabrera
Team coordinator	(Malaysia) Kelly Sathiraj Kalimutu
Media officer	(Malaysia) Nor Asniera Jasni
Team analysts	(Spain) Adrián Sánchez
Team analysts	(Malaysia) Khayruul Niezzarul
Nutritionist	(Argentina) Vanesa Rotondi
Masseurs	(Malaysia) Fariq Mohd Yusof
Masseurs	(Malaysia) Mohamad Rafienudeen Ramlee
Kit managers	(Malaysia) Jaafar Manaf
Kit managers	(Malaysia) A Aziz Hamid
Kit managers	(Malaysia) Luqman Hakim Mazzlan

Source: Team profile at cms.fam.org

== Managerial history ==
Name	From	To	Honours
(Malaysia) Hassan Yahya	1989	1993	
(Argentina) Raul Carrizo	1994	1997	1994 FAM Cup; 1995 FAM Cup
(England) Ron Smith	1998	1999	
(England) Bruce Stowell	1999	2001	2001 Liga Perdana 2
(Malaysia) Azuan Zain	2002	2003	
(Argentina) Raul Carrizo	2004	2005	
(Malaysia) Ramlan Rashid	2005	2010	
(Malaysia) Azuan Zain	2011		
(Malaysia) K. Devan	2012		
(Malaysia) Sazali Saidon	2012		
(Singapore) Fandi Ahmad	3 February 2012	30 July 2013	
(Malaysia) Azmi Mohamed*	30 July 2013	21 August 2013	
(Spain) César Ferrando	21 August 2013	25 February 2014	
(Croatia) Bojan Hodak	25 February 2014	25 April 2015	2014 Malaysia Super League; 2015 Piala Sumbangsih
(Argentina) Mario Gómez	26 April 2015	18 January 2017	2015 Malaysia Super League; 2015 AFC Cup; 2016 Piala Sumbangsih; 2016 Malaysia FA Cup; 2016 Malaysia Super League
(Mexico) Benjamín Mora	18 January 2017	18 June 2017	
(Portugal) Ulisses Morais	19 June 2017	25 February 2018	2017 Malaysia Super League; 2017 Malaysia Cup; 2018 Piala Sumbangsih
(Argentina) Raúl Longhi*	26 February 2018	9 August 2018	2018 Malaysia Super League
(Argentina) Luciano Figueroa	9 August 2018	21 October 2020	2019 Piala Sumbangsih; 2019 Malaysia Super League; 2019 Malaysia Cup; 2020 Piala Sumbangsih; 2020 Malaysia Super League
(Mexico) Benjamín Mora	21 October 2020	27 July 2022	2021 Piala Sumbangsih; 2021 Malaysia Super League; 2022 Piala Sumbangsih
(Venezuela) Héctor Bidoglio	28 July 2022	1 December 2022	2022 Malaysia FA Cup; 2022 Malaysia Super League; 2022 Malaysia Cup
(Argentina) Esteban Solari	1 December 2022	28 December 2023	2023 Piala Sumbangsih; 2023 Malaysia FA Cup; 2023 Malaysia Super League; 2023 Malaysia Cup
(Venezuela) Héctor Bidoglio	29 December 2023	23 May 2025	2024 Piala Sumbangsih; 2024 Malaysia FA Cup; 2024–25 Malaysia Super League; 2024–25 Malaysia Cup
(Spain) Xisco Muñoz	6 June 2025	present	2025 Piala Sumbangsih; 2025 Malaysia FA Cup; 2025–26 Malaysia Super League; 2026 Malaysia Cup; 2026 Piala Sumbangsih

* As interim manager

== See also ==
- Johor Football Association
