= Khairul =

Khairul (خيرول) is a masculine given name commonly used in Malaysia, Indonesia and South Asia. It derives from the Arabic word “Khair” (خير), meaning “goodness,” “blessing,” or “virtue.” Notable people with the name include:

== Sports ==
=== Football ===
- Khairul Izuan Abdullah (born 1986), Malaysian footballer
- Khairul Amri (born 1985), Singaporean footballer
- Khairul Amri (footballer, born 1989) (born 1989), Malaysian footballer
- Khairul Asyraf (disambiguation), multiple people
- Khairul Anuar Baharom (born 1974), Malaysian footballer
- Khairul Izuan (born 1991), Malaysian footballer
- Khairul Ismail (born 1981), Malaysian footballer
- Mohd Khairul Anuar Jamil (born 1981), Malaysian footballer
- Khairul Helmi Johari (born 1988), Malaysian footballer
- Khairul Fahmi Che Mat (born 1989), Malaysian footballer
- Khairul Azman Mohamed (born 1968), Malaysian footballer
- Khairul Nizam (born 1991), Singaporean footballer
- Khairul Ridzwan Othman (born 1991), Malaysian footballer
- Khairul Anwar Abdul Rahim (born 1992), Malaysian footballer
- Mohd Khairul Anuar Ramli (born 1983), Malaysian footballer
- Khairul Akmal Rokisham (born 1998), Malaysian footballer
- Khairul Anwar Shahrudin (born 1990), Malaysian footballer
- Khairul Thaqif (born 1996), Malaysian footballer
- Khairul Imam Zakiri (born 2001), Malaysian footballer

=== Other sports ===
- Khairul Hafiz Jantan (born 1998), Malaysian sprinter
- Khairul Annuar Abdul Kadir (born 1985), Malaysian lawn bowler
- Khairul Anuar Mohamad (born 1991), Malaysian archer
- Khairul Idham Pawi (born 1998), Malaysian motorcycle racer

== Law, politics, military, and royalty ==
- Md. Khairul Alam (born 1971), Bangladeshi judge
- Abul Hasnat Mohammad Khairul Bashar (born 1970), Bangladeshi general
- Khairul Enam, Malaysian lawyer and politician
- A. B. M. Khairul Haque (born 1944), Bangladeshi jurist
- Khairul Hamed, Bruneian military officer
- Khairul Azwan Harun (born 1976), Malaysian politician
- Pengiran Khairul Khalil (born 1975), Prince consort of Brunei
- Khairul Firdaus Akbar Khan (born 1983), Malaysian politician
- Khairul Kabir Khokon (born 1972), Bangladeshi politician
- Khairul Shahril Mohamed, Malaysian politician
- Khairul Anuar Ramli, Malaysian politician
- Khairul Azhari Saut (born 1970), Malaysian politician and businessman

== Other ==
- M Khairul Hossain, Bangladeshi academic
- Khairul Alam Sabuj, Bangladeshi actor, playwright and translator
- Khairul Anam Shakil, Bangladeshi singer

== See also ==
- Myisha Mohd Khairul (born 2002), Malaysian badminton player
