= Rajshahi Cadet College =

Military high school in Bangladesh

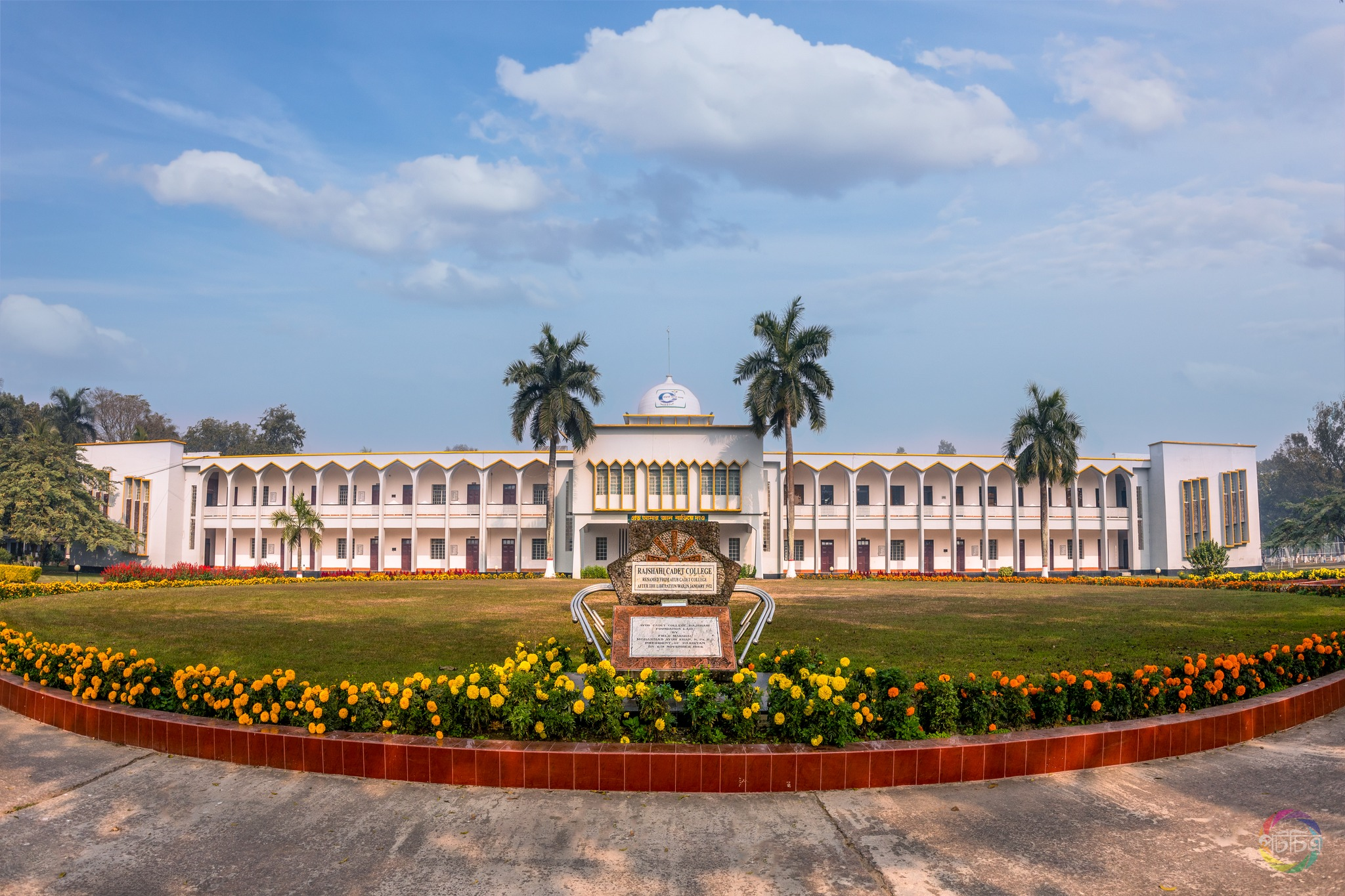
- Photo of Rajshahi Cadet College

Location
- Padma River, Sardah; Upazila: Charghat Upazila; District: Rajshahi; Rajshahi, Bangladesh, 6271; 24.3129°N 88.7190°E

Information
- Former name: Ayub Cadet College
- Motto: Rabbi Zidni Ilma
- Established: November 6, 1964; 62 years ago
- School board: Board of Intermediate and Secondary Education, Rajshahi
- Principal: Captain Anwar Hossain Manzoor, BN
- Vice Principal: A K M Azizul Haque
- Adjutant: Major Fahin Ahmed, BIR
- Language: English
- Area: 110 acres (450,000 m^{2})
- Demonym: Shahi Cadets
- First Principal: Wing Commander Mohammad Syed, PAF
- EIIN: 126592
- Website: rcc.army.mil.bd

Rajshahi Cadet College, (Note: Bengali: রাজশাহী ক্যাডেট কলেজ) formerly known as Ayub Cadet College, (Note: Bengali: আইয়ুব ক্যাডেট কলেজ) is a military high school, located in Sardah, Rajshahi, Bangladesh. It is situated by the bank of Padma river at Mukhtarpur village of Sardah in Charghat of Rajshahi District of northern Bangladesh.

== History ==
Rajshahi Cadet College (RCC), located 25 km (16 mi) from Rajshahi, is a prestigious institution known for its discipline, academic excellence, and leadership training. The foundation stone was laid on 6 November 1964 by Field Marshal Muhammad Ayub Khan, the then President of Pakistan. The college was officially inaugurated on 11 February 1966 as Ayub Cadet College by the Governor of East Pakistan, Abdul Monem Khan.

Following the Bangladesh War of Independence, the college was renamed to Rajshahi Cadet College.

=== Involvement in the War ===
The Independence War in 1971, had strong effects at the then Ayub Cadet College (now Rajshahi Cadet College). Under the leadership of the first Bengali Principal, M. Bakiatullah, along with Adjutant Capt. Md. Abdur Rashid, several faculty members, staff, and cadets actively participated in the movement. They engaged in non-violent protests and the non-cooperation movement, preparing for more challenging circumstances. In secret, they forged connections with the 'Chhatro Sangram Parishad' and political leaders, collaborating with members of the EPR from the Yusufpur Camp to strategize armed resistance.

Senior cadets played an instrumental role by contacting Rajshahi University's 'Chhatro Sangram Parishad' leaders and some even secretly left campus to join the political processions. As the situation became increasingly dire, the authorities decided to close Rajshahi Cadet College on 9 March 1971, sending the cadets home. Yet, many cadets, such as Shaheed Cadet S.A. Momin, Shaheed Cadet Abdul Mannaf, Shaheed Cadet Abdullah Al Mamun, and Shaheed Cadet Md Zakaria, returned to fight for independence. Some senior cadets chose to stay in Rajshahi, directly engaging in the movement. These cadets, along with their fellow fighters, are commemorated on the college's Honor Board.

Meanwhile, 'Mukti Sangram Parishad' was formed, with the vice principal of the then Sardah Police Academy (Bangladesh Police Academy), Mr. Barua, as the president, Awami League leader Mr. Azizur Rahman as the secretary, and Subedar Mohammad Mojibur Rahman as the commander. Members of Rajshahi Cadet College joined the freedom fighters, collaborating with local students, police, Ansar, EPR, and Mujahid members. Armed with 303 rifles from the cadet college and over 600 rifles from the Sardah Police Academy, they took up positions in bunkers near the Sardah-Rajshahi road to resist the advancing enemy forces.

The deteriorating political climate led to further acceleration of the movement. On 23 March 1971, Rajshahi Cadet College, like many other places in the country, replaced the Pakistani flag with the Bangladeshi flag, and the institution was renamed 'Muktarpur Cadet College'. That evening, a large procession, led by Principal M. Bakiatullah and Adjutant Capt. Abdur Rashid, marched through the college and neighboring areas. The entire college community, except for a few, united with the local population to oppose Pakistani rule.

On the evening of 27 March, Capt. Abdur Rashid, along with faculty and staff, took the responsibility of continuing the fight in southern Rajshahi. Cadet S.A. Momin, on leave, fought in the frontlines of Bogura but was captured, tortured, and martyred by Pakistani forces on 29 March 1971, becoming the first cadet martyr in Bangladesh's history. Cadet Md Zakaria, also on leave, prepared to join Muktibahini in Parbatipur, Dinajpur, but was killed in a surprise attack on his family. Similarly, Cadet Abdullah Al Mamun fought gallantly in Sector-7, West Dinajpur, Naogaon, where he died.

On 30 March, Principal M. Bakiatullah traveled to Baharampur, crossing the Padma River, to manage a refugee camp. He later joined the 'Youth Camp' in Calcutta, where he trained fighters.

=== Traditions ===
The college celebrates its founding day annually on 11 February.

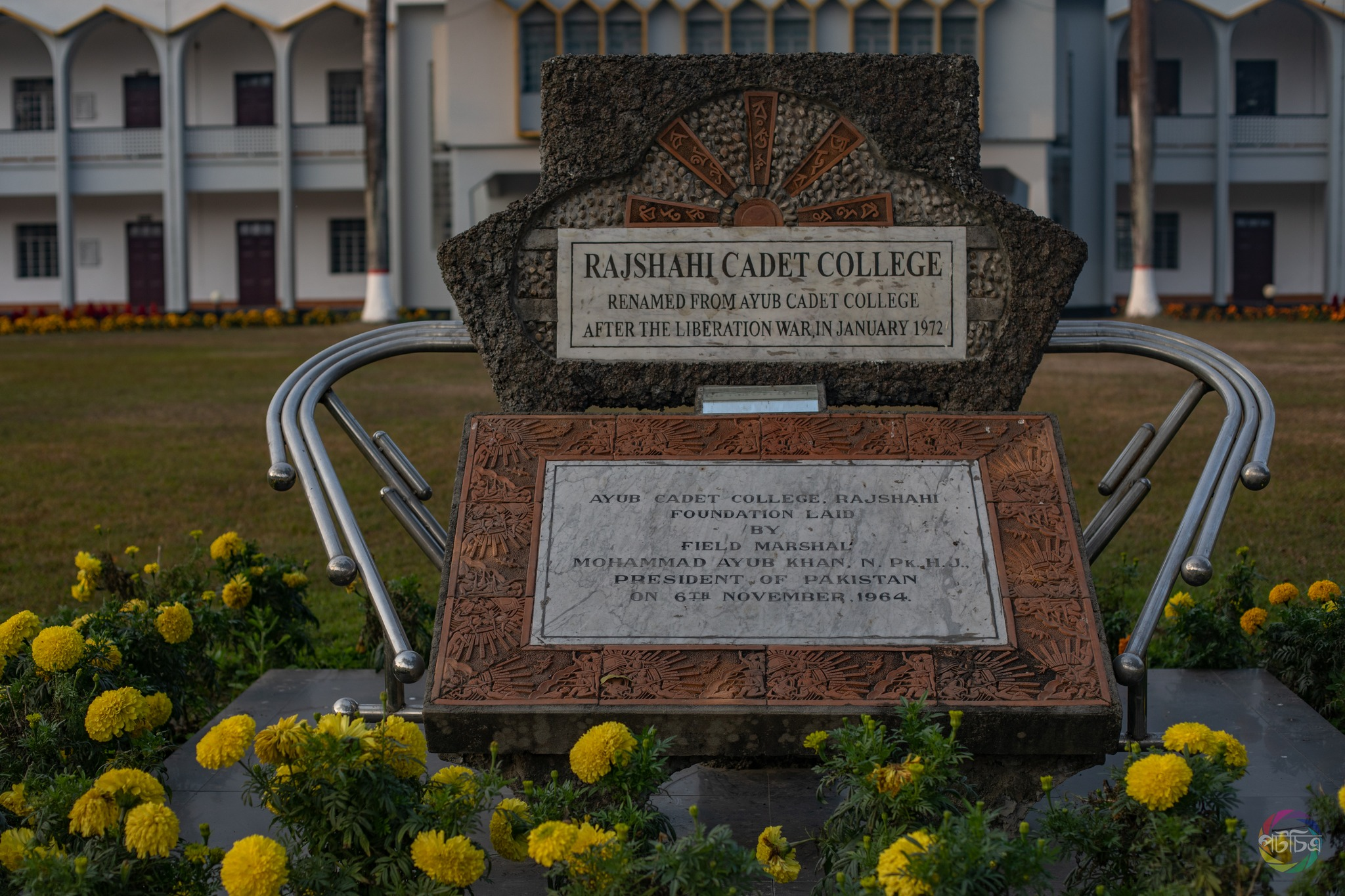
Foundation Stone of RCC laid by Field Marshal Ayub Khan on 6 November 1964

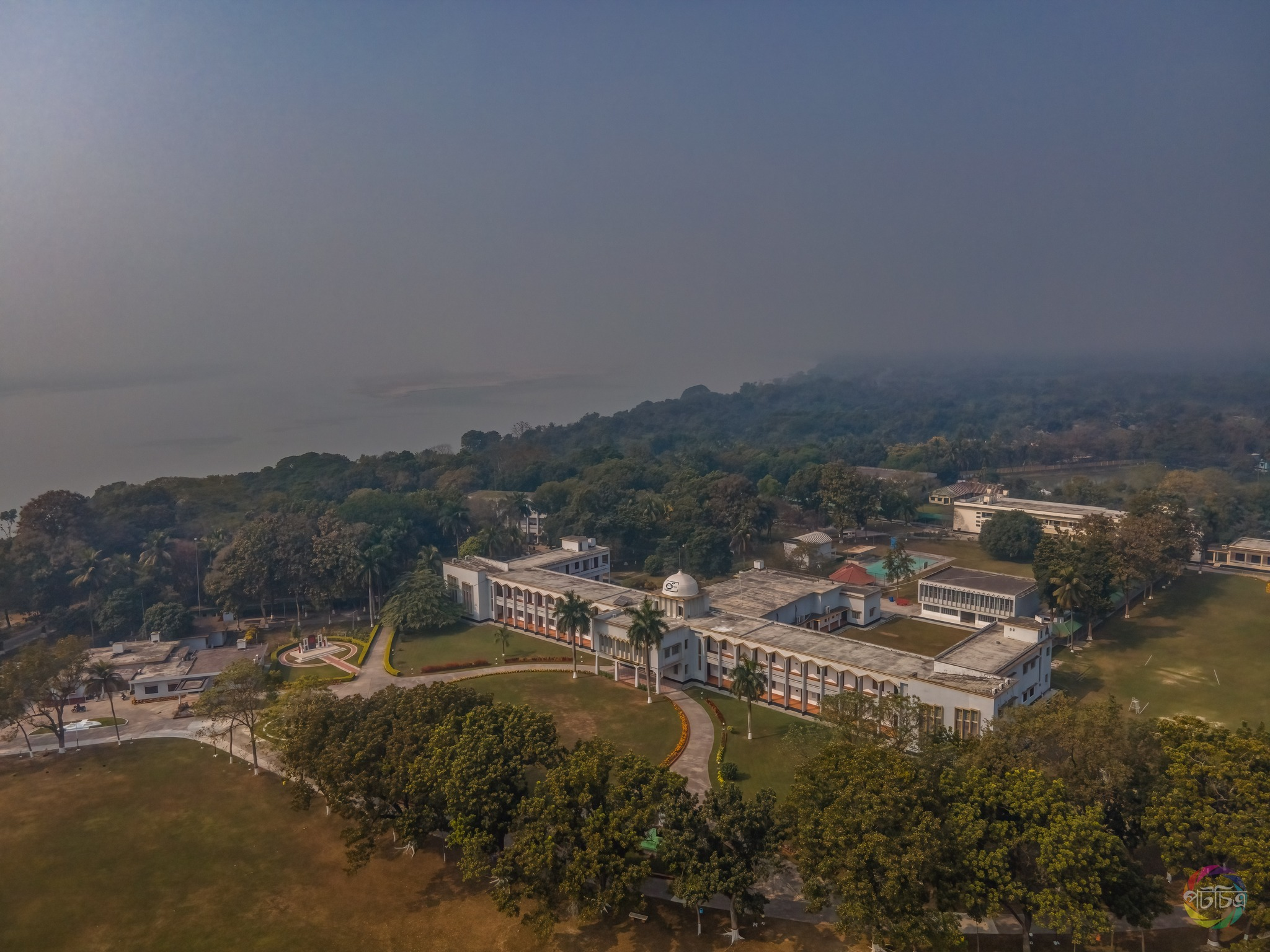
Aerial view of RCC

== Infrastructure ==
=== Sports facilities ===
Rajshahi Cadet College has six basketball courts, a tennis complex, five football grounds and several volleyball courts, a golf course, a hockey field, a squash complex, a swimming complex with a gymnasium, and a mile test track with lighting for both day and nighttime exercises along with an athletics track and field.

=== Auditorium ===
Rajshahi Cadet College boasts the Bir Shrestha Sepahi Mustafa Kamal Auditorium, a state-of-the-art facility designed for various cultural and academic events. This two-storied auditorium is equipped with stage setups, modern audiovisual effects, and light projection. With a seating capacity of 650, it serves as the central hub for debates, theatrical performances, and ceremonial programs.

=== Dining hall ===
The Bir Sreshtha Flight Lt. Matiur Rahman Dining Hall serves as a central dining facility for cadets. Its operations are overseen by a faculty member designated as the 'Officer-in-Charge Cadet Mess', assisted by a Grade-12 cadet appointed as the College Dining Hall and Mosque Prefect.

=== Library ===
Situated in the southeastern corner of the auditorium, the college's central library features world literature, encyclopedias, reference materials on diverse subjects, and books on the 1971 War.

=== IT labs ===
Rajshahi Cadet College is home to two state-of-the-art IT labs, each equipped with 28 high-performance computers, modern sound systems, and high-speed internet. These labs provide an interactive and collaborative learning environment where cadets engage in assignments, research, and various national and international competitions, ensuring they stay ahead in the digital age.

== Houses ==
House	Colour	Logo	Motto	Named after
Khalid House	Green	Eagle	Knowledge is Power	Khalid bin Walid
Qasim House	Navy blue	Lion	Work is Strength	Muhammad Bin Qasim
Tariq House	Red	Tiger	Truth is Beauty	Tariq bin Ziyad

== Administration ==
At the helm is the principal, who may be either a serving military officer of the rank lieutenant colonel/colonel (or their equivalent in the Navy or Air Force) or a senior officer from the Cadet College Service, promoted from the faculty as per regulations.

Steering the Academic Wing is the vice principal, the highest-ranking civilian officer from the Cadet College Service, promoted from the rank of associate professor.

Managing the Administration Wing is the adjutant, a major (or equivalent rank in the Navy and Air Force) from the Bangladesh Armed Forces. As the principal's staff officer, he plays a role in maintaining order and operational efficiency. Additionally, he serves as instructor class-B, shaping the training programs that instill discipline and leadership of cadets.

The Medical Wing is under the expert care of the medical officer, a captain or major from the Army Medical Corps, who ensures cadets receive healthcare and medical attention.

Each cadet house is under the guidance of a house master, a senior faculty member of associate professor rank, responsible for maintaining discipline, mentorship, and overall house administration. Supporting them are house tutors, faculty members who provide personalized guidance.

Overseeing financial stability is the accounts officer, ensuring efficient budgeting and financial management to keep the institution running smoothly.

=== Central administration ===
- Principal: A K M Azizul Haque (Acting)
- Vice Principal: A K M Azizul Haque
- Adjutant: Maj. Fahin Ahmed, _{BIR}
- Medical Officer: Maj. Muhammad Abdullahil Mamun, _{AMC}
- Accounts Officer: Lecturer Abu Qauser, (acting)
- OIC Mess: Assistant Professor Md. Shafiul Alam

=== House Administration ===
- House Master (KH): Associate Professor Md. Sadekul Islam Raju
- House Master (QH): Associate Professor Mrs.Shamima Khatoon
- House Master (TH): Associate Professor Md. Monirul Islam

=== Cadet Administration (58th Batch) ===
- College Prefect : Cadet Ishrar
- College Games Prefect: Cadet Hasib
- College Cultural Prefect: Cadet Ahnaf
- College Dining Hall and Mosque Prefect: Cadet Aurik
- House Prefect (QH): Cadet Naeem
- House Prefect (KH): Cadet Sajid
- House Prefect (TH): Cadet Akib
- Assistant House Prefect (QH): Cadet Ananta
- Assistant House Prefect (KH): Cadet Aritro
- Assistant House Prefect (TH): Cadet Amanoth
- House Games Prefect (QH): Cadet Naeem
- House Games Prefect (KH): Cadet Nadim
- House Games Prefect (TH): Cadet Faysal
- House Cultural Prefect (QH): Cadet Spaursho
- House Cultural Prefect (KH): Cadet Emon
- House Cultural Prefect (TH): Cadet Nafi

== Old Rajshahi Cadets Association ==
Logo of ORCA

The alumni association of the college is known as the Old Rajshahi Cadets Association (ORCA) or Old Sardah Cadets Association (OSCA). It was created in 1972 to allow for the maintenance of relationships between former cadets.

The first constitution was adopted on 1 October 1973 and the logo was designed by Muhammad Ehsanullah. AKM Saiful Majid was named as the founder vice-president of the association. Shortly thereafter as he left the country, Sadirul Islam took over the reins.

During that time and subsequent periods, the incumbent Principal of Rajshahi Cadet College was designated as the ex officio President of OSCA/ORCA. Therefore, the late M. Bakiatullah was the first President of OSCA/ORCA.

== Notable alumni ==
- Sheikh Abdul Hamid: professor at Boston University
- Md. Touhid Hossain: Former Adviser for Foreign Affairs to the Interim government of Bangladesh, and former foreign secretary of Bangladesh
- Lieutenant general Aminul Karim: Former Military Secretary to the President of Bangladesh, Iajuddin Ahmed
- Lieutenant general Abdul Hafiz: Former Special Assistant to the Chief Adviser on Defense and National Integration (Interim government of Bangladesh), and former Chief of General Staff, Bangladesh Army
- Mrinal Haque: Renowned sculptor. Appointed by the Government of Bangladesh, best known for having created murals on the city streets of Dhaka, the capital of Bangladesh
- Mohammad Sufiur Rahman: Former Permanent Representative of Bangladesh to the United Nations Office in Geneva, Former director, South Asian Association Regional Cooperation Secretariat, Former ambassador of Bangladesh to Switzerland, Former High Commissioner of Bangladesh to Australia
- Enamul Karim Nirjhar: Bangladeshi architect and filmmaker
- M. Saif Islam: Bangladeshi-American professor of electrical and computer engineering at the University of California, Davis
- Major General Jahangir Kabir Talukdar: President of Old Rajshahi Cadets' Association (ORCA), Former commandant of Bangladesh Military Academy & former ambassador of Bangladesh in Kenya
- Rana Mohammad Sohel: politician and the Member of Parliament for Nilphamari-3
- Major General Mohammad Habib Ullah: Colonel Commandant of Armoured Corps and Present Chairman of Sena Kalyan Sangstha, Former Commandant of the School of Military Intelligence and Armoured Corps Center and School (ACC&S), Former Principal of Rajshahi Cadet College
- Major General Mohammed Saidul Islam: Former Commandant of Bangladesh Institute of Peace Support Operation Training (BIPSOT), Former Commandant of Military Institute of Science and Technology, and Former Chairman of Sena Kalyan Sangstha
- Major general AKM Abdullahil Baquee: Former Commandant of School of Infantry and Tactics (SI&T), Former Commandant of Defence Services Command and Staff College (DSCSC), and Former GOC 11th Infantry Division
- Major Gazi Md Maksud Ur Rahim(retd), Senior Manager, KDS Group

== Photo gallery ==
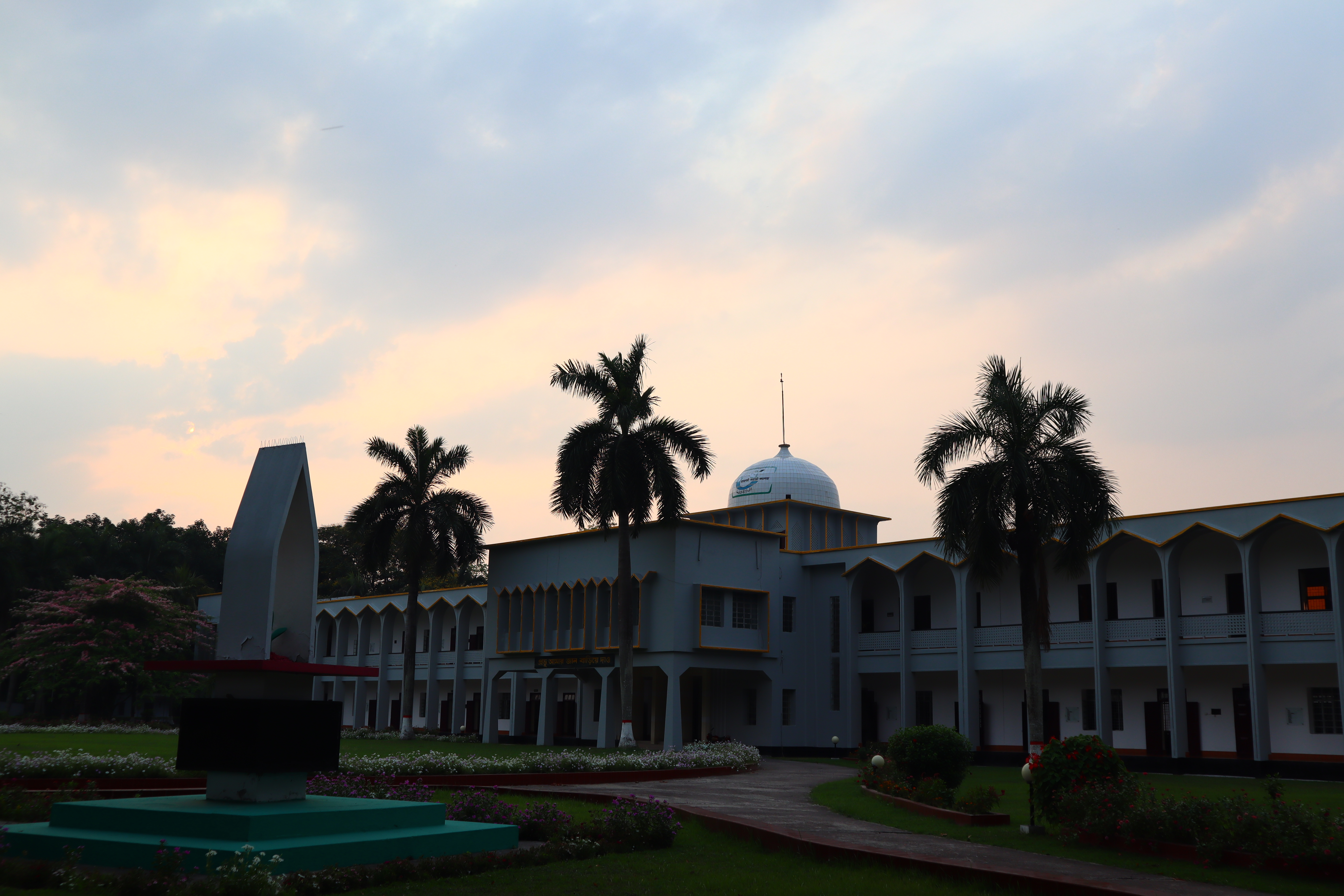
Bir Sreshtho Jahangir Building, RCC

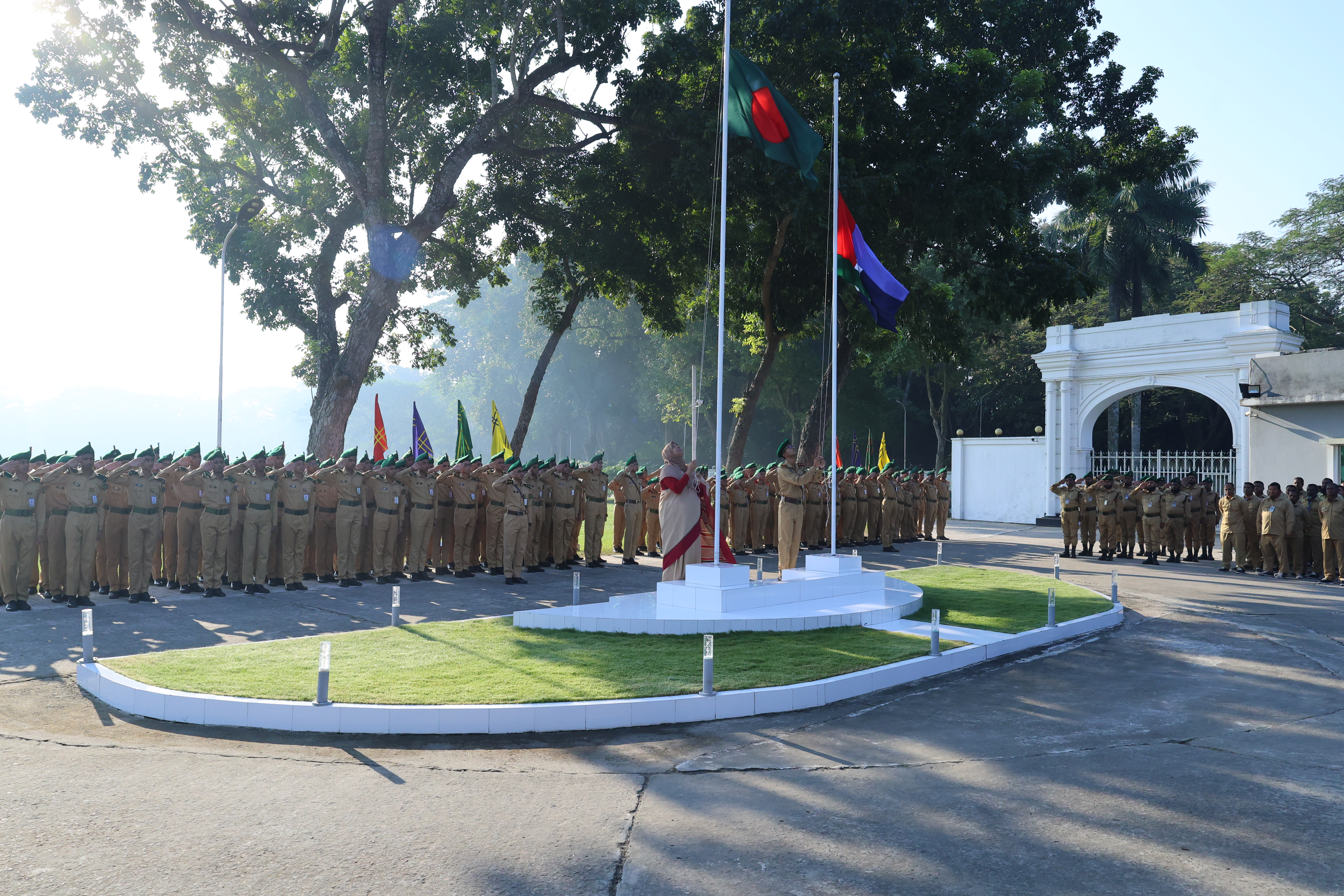
Flag Raising Ceremony

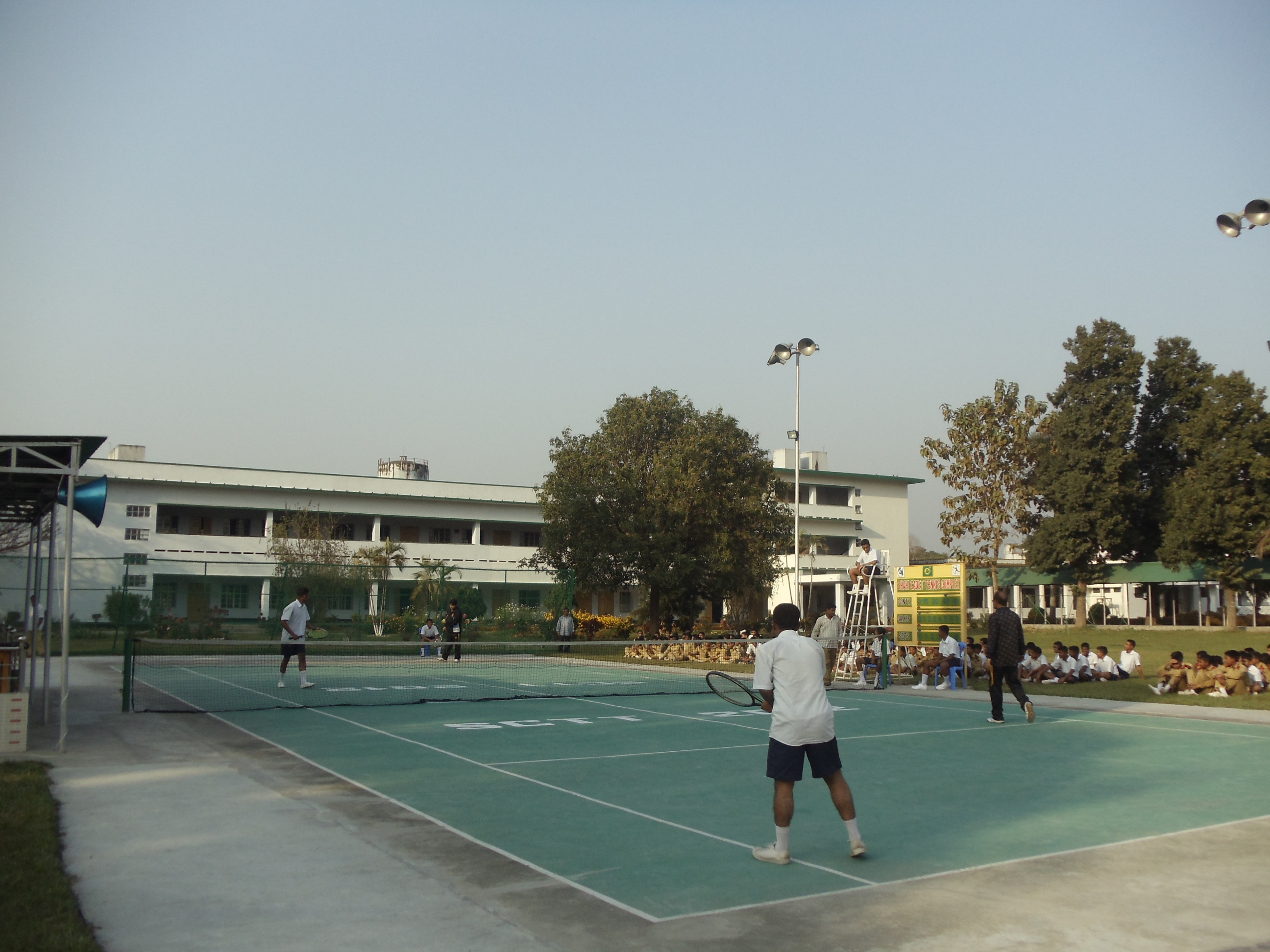
Shahi Cadet Tennis Complex

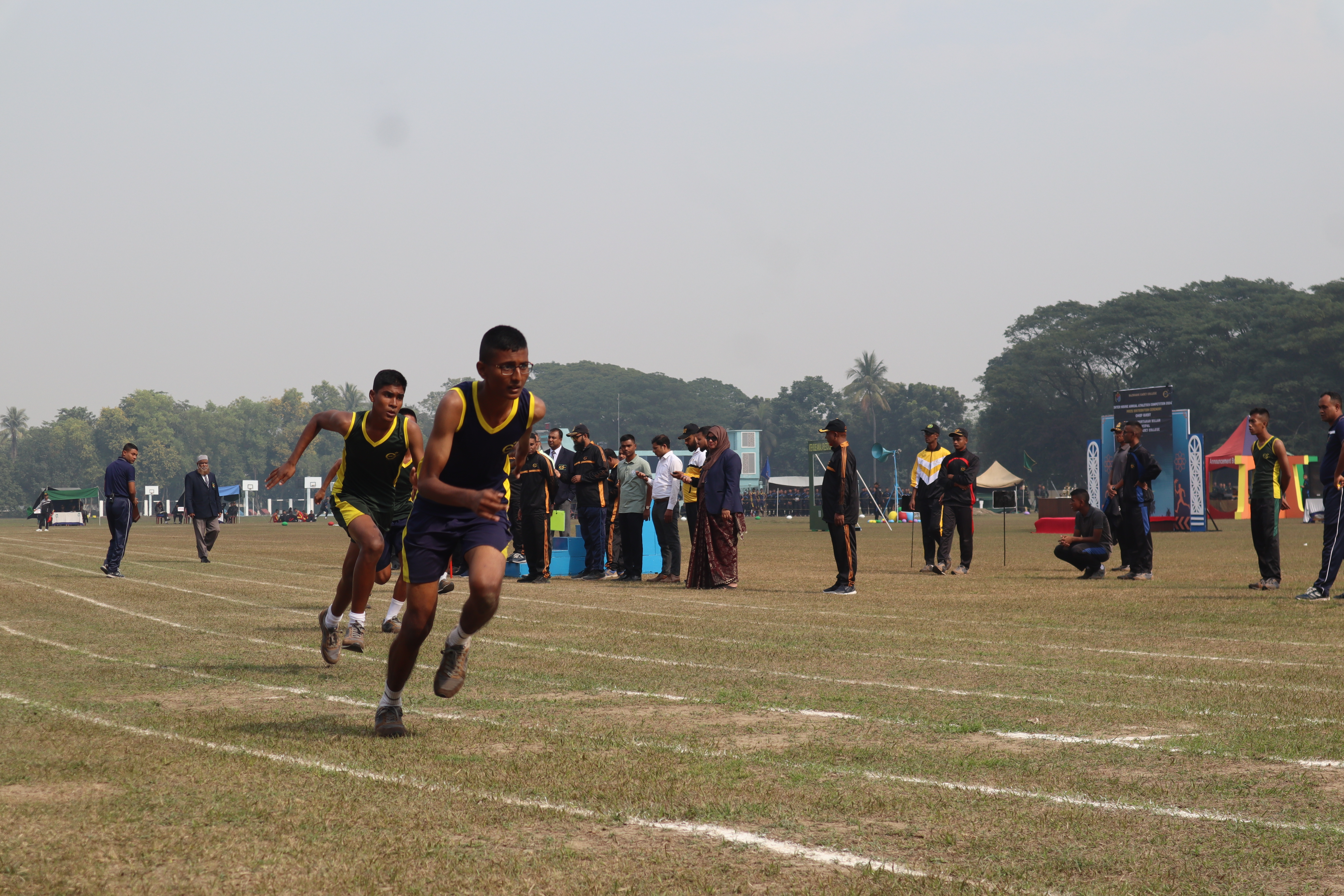
Inter House Athletics Competition

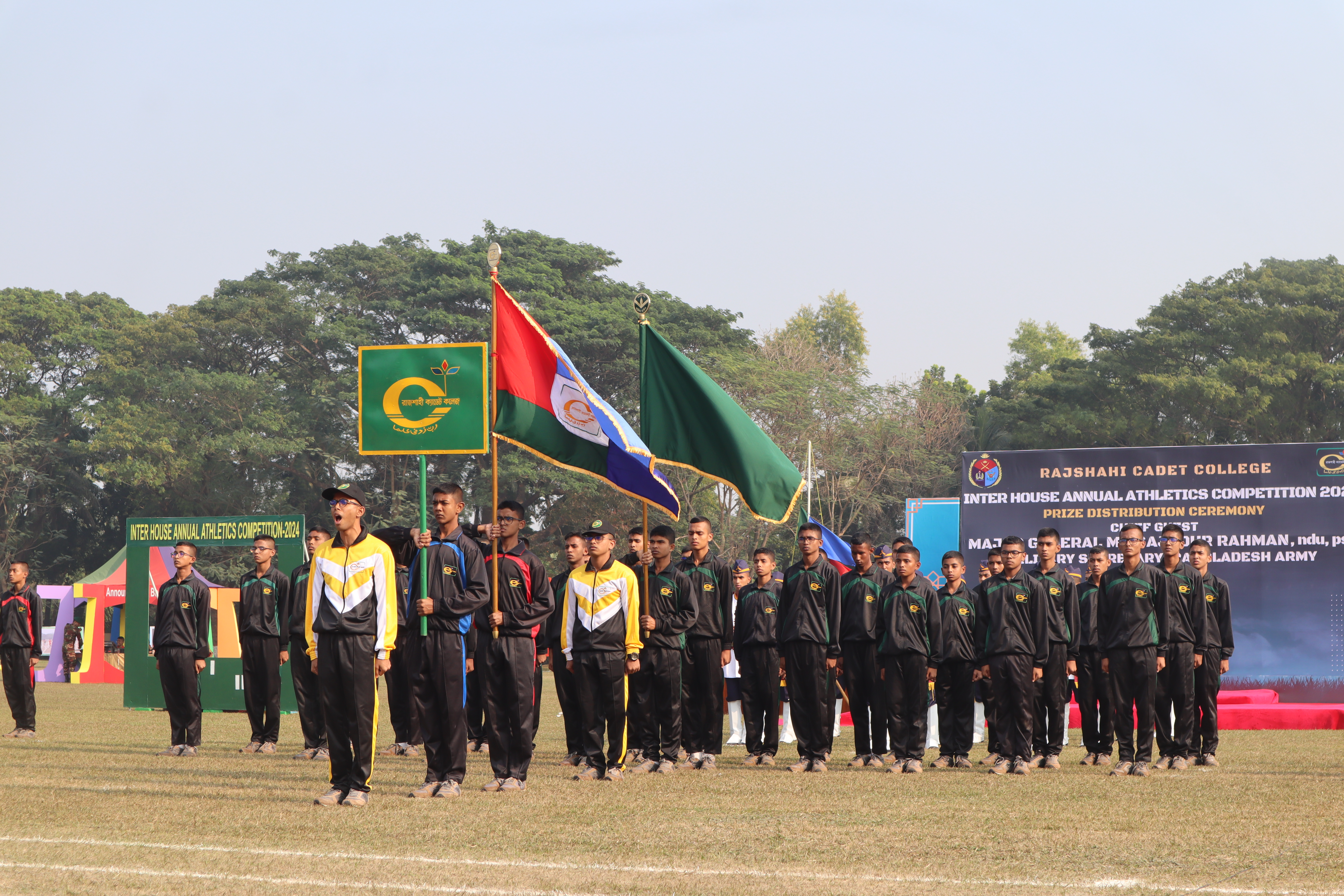
College Prefect along with College Flag Bearer standing in front of the Athletes Contingent of Khalid House

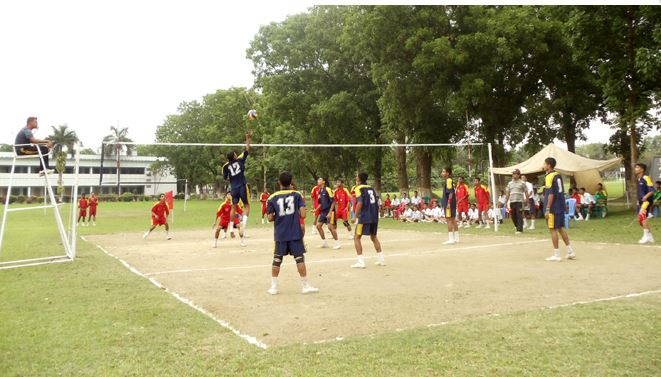
Inter House Volleyball Competition

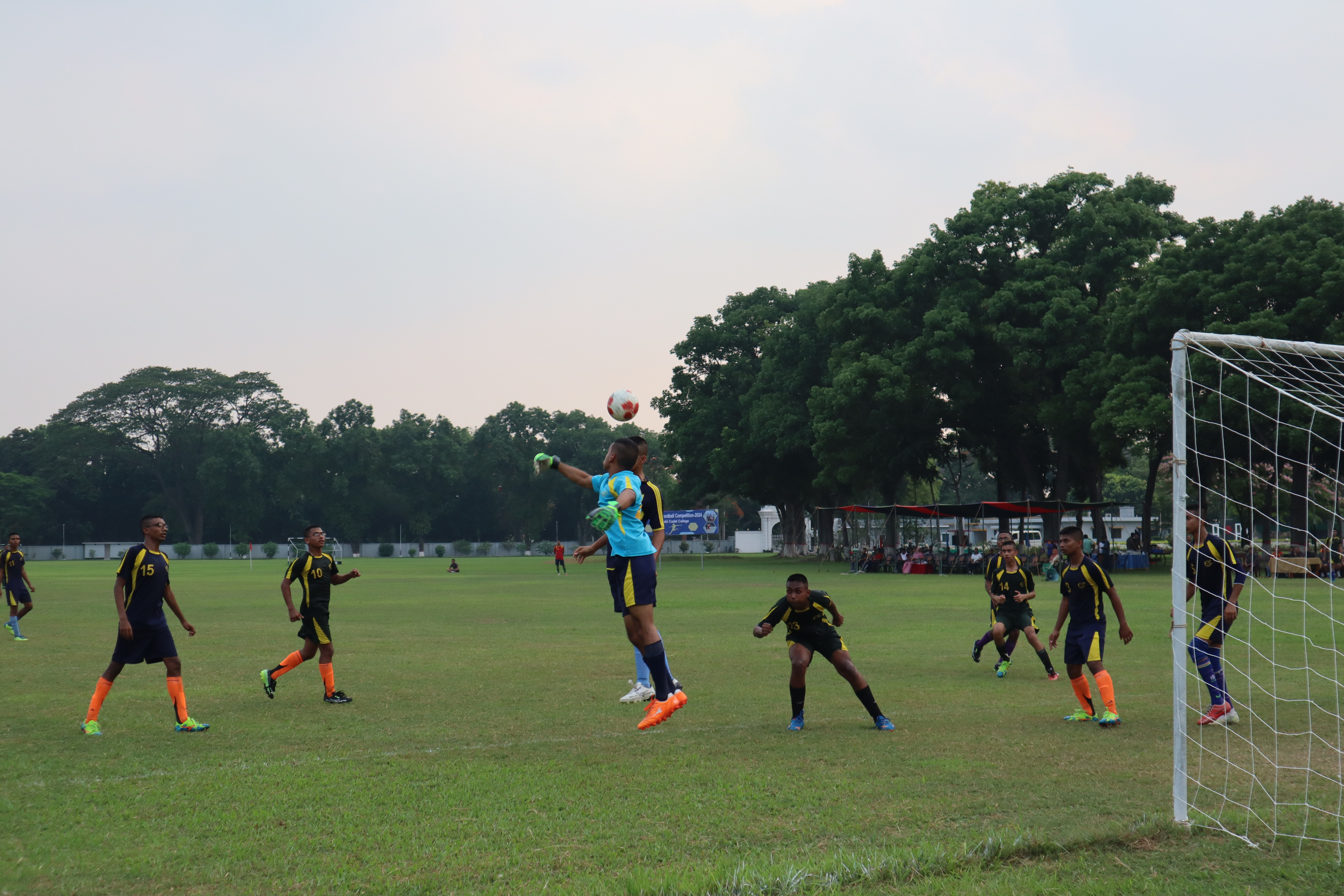
Inter House Football Competition

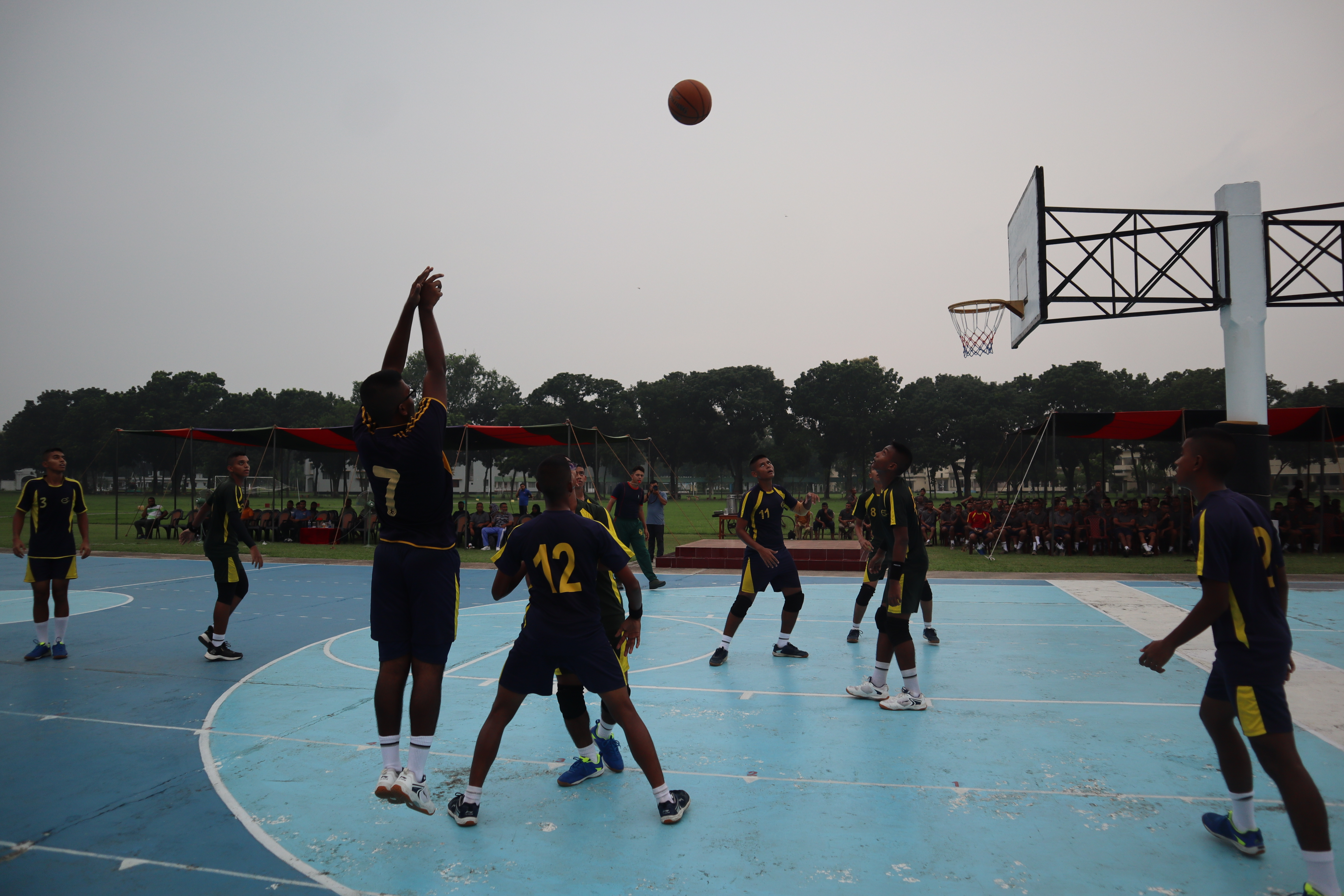
Inter House Basketball Competition

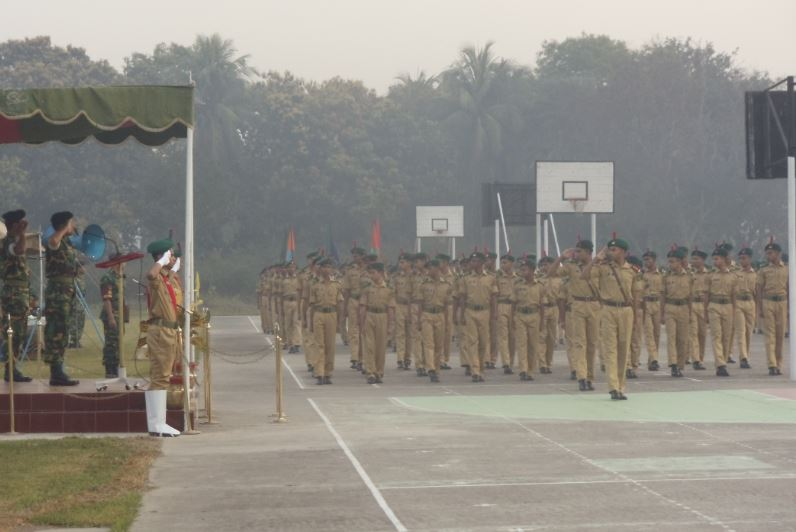
Principals' Parade Inspection

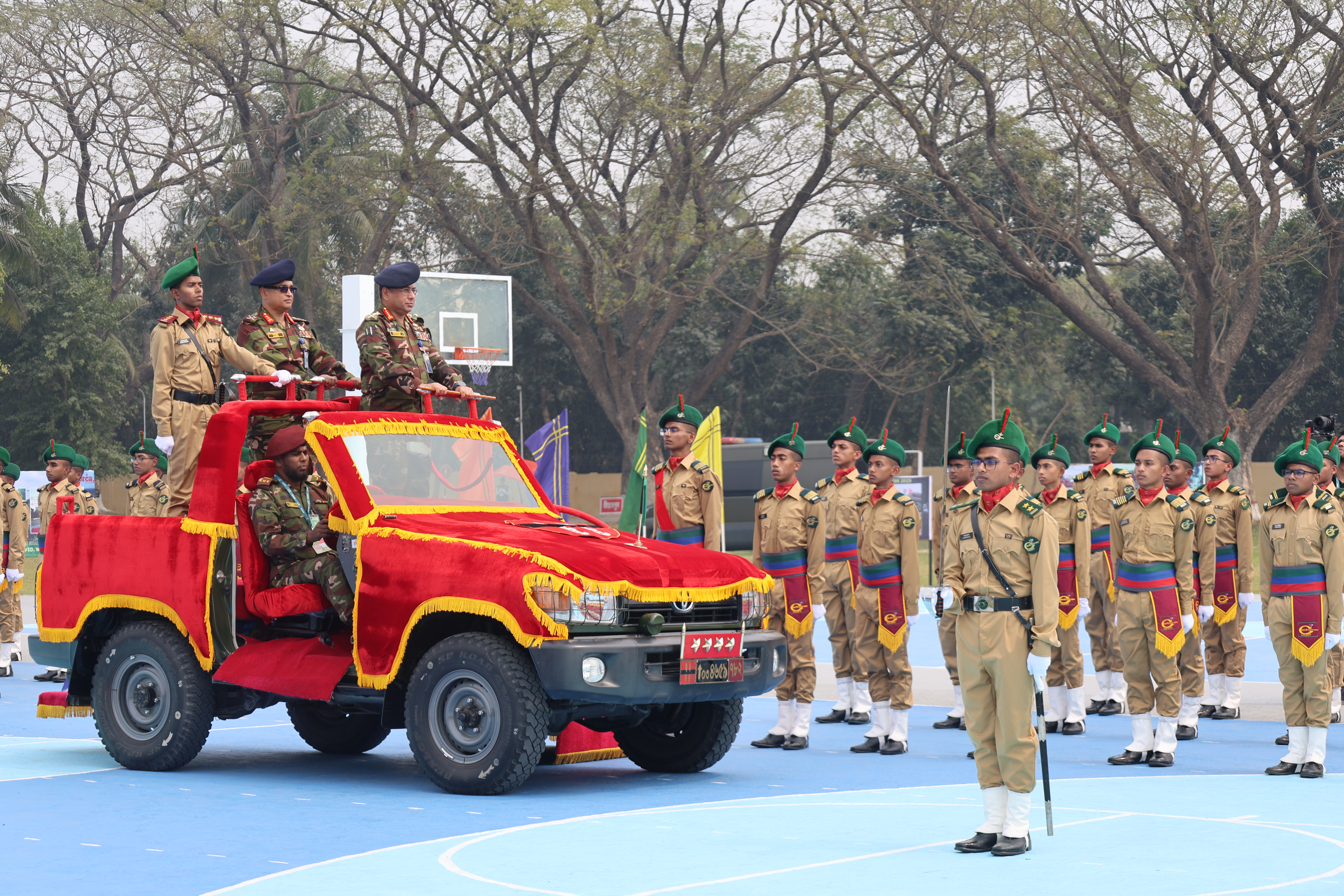
Respected CAS inspecting the parade of ORCA Reunion 2025
