= 2011 Johor F.C. season =

Johor FC
2011 season
- Owner: Johor Corporation
- Manager: Mohd Faizal Abdullah
- Head Coach: Mohd Azuan Zin
- Stadium: Pasir Gudang Stadium
- Super League: 7th
- FA Cup: Second round
- Malaysia Cup: Group stage
- Top goalscorer: League: Shahrizal Saad (5); All: Shahrizal Saad (7)
- Biggest win: 5–0 vs SPA (H), 19 September 2011, FA Cup
- Biggest defeat: 1–4 vs Kelantan (A), 12 February 2011, Super League
Home colours	Away colours	Third colours

The 2011 season was Johor Football Club's 39th season in club history, their 5th season in the Malaysia Super League since its rebranding in 2004, and their 7th in the Malaysian first division.

Johor FC played in the Malaysian Super League and the Malaysian FA Cup. Johor FC qualified for the Malaysia Cup, after finishing 7th in the Super League. Johor qualified to the Malaysia FA Cup quarterfinals with their coach Mohd Azuan Mohd Zin. They failed to advance further after being defeated. Johor ended their Malaysia Cup campaign in the group stage, where they notably drew 1–1 against Kelantan FA at home but were defeated 2–1 in the away match.

== Season overview ==

Johor FC's usual starting lineup in the 2011 season

The 2011 season was a challenging one for Johor FC, as the club finished only seventh in the Malaysia Super League and failed to progress beyond the group stage of the Malaysia Cup, though they did reach the second round of the Malaysia FA Cup.

=== Super League ===
Johor FC endured an inconsistent Malaysia Super League campaign, finishing seventh with 34 points from 26 matches, recording 8 wins, 10 draws, and 8 defeats, with 26 goals scored and 28 conceded for a goal difference of −2. The campaign ran from 29 January to 6 July, with Johor FC finishing well behind the leading pack, as Kelantan claimed the title. The seventh-place finish represented a clear decline from the fourth-place finish the previous season, though Johor FC still avoided relegation.

=== FA Cup ===
In the Malaysia FA Cup, Johor FC enjoyed a brief but emphatic start, thrashing SPA FC 5–0 at the Pasir Gudang Stadium on 19 February in the first round. However, their run ended in the second round just two weeks later, as they lost 0–1 at home to Kelantan on 4 March. The early exit meant Johor FC's only realistic chance of silverware that season rested on the Malaysia Cup.

=== Malaysia Cup ===
The Malaysia Cup offered little improvement, as Johor FC were placed in Group C alongside Kelantan, Felda United, and Perak. Johor FC managed only 2 wins, 2 draws, and 2 defeats from 6 matches, scoring 7 goals and conceding 7 for a level goal difference, finishing third in the group with 8 points and failing to advance to the knockout rounds. Notable results included a 3–1 win over Sarawak and a 1–1 draw with group winners Kelantan, but defeats to Felda United and Perak ultimately proved costly.

== Squads ==
=== First team squad ===
No.	Name	Age	Nat.	Position	Join	Signed From	D.O.B
Goalkeepers
1	Suhardi Alby	28	(Malaysia)	GK	2011	(Malaysia) USM	13 Mac 1983
21	Fazli Paat	23	(Malaysia)	GK	2011	(Malaysia) Youth systems	27 November 1987
22	Anis Faron	29	(Malaysia)	GK	2008	(Malaysia) Selangor	9 November 1982
Defenders
2	Mat Saiful Mohamad	31	(Malaysia)	LB	2011	(Malaysia) Kuala Muda Naza	1983
3	Hamzani Omar	33	(Malaysia)	CB	2007	(Malaysia) Johor FA	30 Sep 1978
4	Hafiz Aridin	22	(Malaysia)	CB	2011	(Malaysia) Youth systems	1989
6	Izuan Jarudin	26	(Malaysia)	CB	2010	(Malaysia) Kedah	4 July 1985
16	Hasnizaidi Jamian	21	(Malaysia)	RB	2011	(Malaysia) Youth system	27 Mar 1990
17	Rahman Zabul	29	(Malaysia)	CB	2011	(Malaysia) Negeri Sembilan	25 July 1982
11	Khairi Kiman	27	(Malaysia)	CB	2004	(Malaysia) Youth systems	3 March 1984
7	Ezaidy Khadar	28	(Malaysia)	CB	2004	(Malaysia) Youth systems	17 Jan. 1983
5	Radzi Razman	-	(Malaysia)	LB	2010	(Malaysia) Youth systems	-
12	Irfan Ghani	22	(Malaysia)	LB	2011	(Malaysia) Johor FA	17 June 1989
14	Rizal Roslan	28	(Malaysia)	CB	2010	(Malaysia) Youth systems	14 Mac 1983
Midfielders
8	Azizan Baba	30	(Malaysia)	CM	2005	(Malaysia) Malacca United	9 Sept 1981
10	Khairul Ismail	30	(Malaysia)	CB / DM / CM	2010	(Malaysia) Kedah	11 Dec. 1981
9	Eddy Helmi	32	(Malaysia)	CM / AM	2001	(Malaysia) Youth systems	8 Dec. 1979
15	Riduwan Maon	30	(Malaysia)	CB / DM / CM	2006	(Malaysia) Youth systems	5 Oct. 1981
20	Syafuan Ridwan	20	(Malaysia)	CB / DM / CM	2011	(Malaysia) Youth systems	9 Jul. 1990
23	Rezal Zambery	33	(Malaysia)	CM	2011	(Malaysia) Negeri Sembilan	10 Oct 1978
-	Saufi Ibrahim	-	(Malaysia)	CM	2011	(Malaysia) Youth systems	-
-	Badrul Khalid	-	(Malaysia)	AM	2011	(Malaysia) Youth systems	-
-	Akhmal Mohd Noor	22	(Malaysia)	CM	2011	(Malaysia) Penang	8 October 1989
Forwards
18	Shahrizal Saad	24	(Malaysia)	ST	2011	(Malaysia) Perak	5 June 1987
19	Rashid Aya	21	(Malaysia)	ST	2009	(Malaysia) Youth systems	4 June 1990
24	Wan Mohd Hoesne	24	(Malaysia)	ST / CF	2008	(Malaysia) Selangor FA President's Cup Team	2 Sept 1987

== Transfers ==
In

No.	Pos.	Name	Age	From
1	GK	(Malaysia) Suhardy Alby	28	(Malaysia) USM
5	DF	(Malaysia) Radzi Jasman	21	(Malaysia) Johor FA
12	DF	(Malaysia) Irfan Ghani	22	(Malaysia) Johor FA
17	DF	(Malaysia) Mohd Rahman Zabul	28	(Malaysia) Negeri Sembilan
-	MF	(Malaysia) Akhmal Mohd Noor	22	(Malaysia) Penang
23	MF	(Malaysia) Rezal Zambery	32	(Malaysia) Negeri Sembilan
18	FW	(Malaysia) Shahrizal Saad	24	(Malaysia) Negeri Sembilan
24	FW	(Malaysia) Wan Mohd Hoesne	23	(Malaysia) PKNS
-	MF	(Malaysia) Saudi Ibrahim	-	(Malaysia) Felda United F.C.

Out

No.	Pos.	Name	Age	To
4	DF	(Malaysia) Wan Rohaimi	35	(Malaysia) Kelantan
12	Winger	(Malaysia) Azwan Roya	25	(Malaysia) Kelantan

== Competition ==
=== Overview ===
Competition	First match	Last match	Starting round	Final position	Record							
Competition	First match	Last match	Starting round	Final position	Pld	W	D	L	GF	GA	GD	Win %
Malaysia Super League	29 January 2011	6 July 2011	Matchday 1	7th	26	8	10	8	26	28	−2	30.77
Malaysia FA Cup	19 February 2011	4 March 2011	First round	Second round	2	1	0	1	5	1	+4	50.00
Malaysia Cup	6 September 2011	27 September 2011	Group stage	Group stage	6	2	2	2	7	1	+6	33.33
Total					34	11	12	11	38	30	+8	32.35

Last updated: 28 September 2011
Source: Competitions

=== Malaysia Super League ===
==== Matches ====
Win Draw Loss

29 January 2011 1	Johor FC	0 – 0	Felda United	Pasir Gudang, Johor
20:45				Stadium: Pasir Gudang Stadium

1 February 2011 2	Perak	1 – 0	Johor FC	Ipoh, Perak
20:45	Akhmal Rizal Ahmad Rakhli 90+2'			Stadium: Perak Stadium

12 February 2011 3	Kelantan	4 – 1	Johor FC	Kota Bharu, Kelantan
20:45	Nurul Azwan Roya 29'; Norshahrul Idlan Talaha 49', 72'; Mohd Nizab Ayub 77'		Mohd Riduan Ma'on 25'	Stadium: Std Sultan Mohamad Ke-IV

26 February 2011 4	Johor FC	0 – 0	Selangor	Pasir Gudang, Johor
20:45				Stadium: Pasir Gudang Corporation Stadium

1 March 2011 5	Terengganu	3 – 0	Johor FC	Kuala Terengganu, Terengganu
16:45	Abdul Hadi Yahya 6'; Ismail Faruqi Bin Ash'ari 12'; Ashaari Samsudin 79'			Stadium: Sultan Ismail Nasiruddin Shah Stadium

11 March 2011 6	Johor FC	0 – 0	Kuala Lumpur	Pasir Gudang, Johor
20:45				Stadium: Pasir Gudang Corporation Stadium

2 April 2011 7	Perlis	2 – 2	Johor FC	Kangar, Perlis
20:45	Azmizi Bin Azmi 34'; Phul Sarkh a/l Lom 90'		Shahrizal Bin Mohd Saad 7'; Mohamed Rashid Mohamed Aya 21'	Stadium: Utama Negeri Stadium

5 April 2011 8	Kedah	1 – 2	Johor FC	Alor Setar, Kedah
20:45	Mohd Khyril Muhymeen Bin Zamri 52'		Mohamed Rashid Mohamad Aya 38'; Rezal Zambery Bin Yahya 40'	Stadium: Darul Aman Stadium

9 April 2011 9	Johor FC	0 – 0	Negeri Sembilan	Pasir Gudang, Johor
20:45				Stadium: Pasir Gudang Corporation Stadium

12 April 2011 10	Pahang	0 – 0	Johor FC	Kuantan, Pahang
20:45				Stadium: Darul Makmur Stadium

16 April 2011 11	Johor FC	0 – 1	Harimau Muda	Pasir Gudang, Johor
20:45			Mohd Irfan 7'	Stadium: Pasir Gudang Corporation Stadium

19 April 2011 12	T-Team	1 – 1	Johor FC	Kuala Terengganu, Terengganu
20:45	Mohd Shahrul Ezrain Bin Samsudin 10'		Shahrizal Bin Mohd Saad 48'	Stadium: Sultan Ismail Nasiruddin Shah Stadium

23 April 2011 13	Johor FC	2 – 1	T-Team	Pasir Gudang, Johor
20:45	Shahrizal Bin Mohd Saad 18'; Mohamed Rashid Mohamad Aya 80'		Indra Putra Mahayuddin 86'	Stadium: Pasir Gudang Corporation Stadium

26 April 2011 14	Felda United	0 – 0	Johor FC	Cheras, Kuala Lumpur
20:45				Stadium: Kuala Lumpur Stadium

30 April 2011 15	Johor FC	3 – 0	Sabah	Pasir Gudang, Johor
20:45	Eddy Helmi Abdul Manan 42'; Mohd Riduwan Ma'on 80'; Shahrizal Bin Mohd Saad 92'			Stadium: Pasir Gudang Corporation Stadium

3 May 2011 16	Johor FC	0 – 1	Kelantan	Pasir Gudang, Johor
20:45			Mohd Badhri Bin Mohd Radzi 41'	Stadium: Pasir Gudang Corporation Stadium

6 May 2011 17	Selangor	3 – 2	Johor FC	Shah Alam, Selangor
20:45	Rudie Bin Ramli 64'; Mohd Amri Bin Yahyah 69'; Azidan Bin Sarudin 77'		Shahrizal Bin Mohd Saad 22'; Mohammad Khairul Bin Ismail 80'	Stadium: Shah Alam Stadium

10 May 2011 18	Johor FC	2 – 1	Terengganu	Pasir Gudang, Johor
20:45	Mohd Khairul Bin Ismail 14'; Mohamad Izuan Bin Jarudin 17'		Abdul Manaf Bin Mamat 53'	Stadium: Pasir Gudang Corporation Stadium

20 May 2011 19	Negeri Sembilan	2 – 1	Johor FC	Paroi, Negeri Sembilan
20:45	Shahurain Abu Samah 7'; Shukur Adan 38'		Mohd Riduwan Ma'on 51'	Stadium: Tuanku Abdul Rahman Stadium

24 May 2011 20	Johor FC	2 – 1	Perlis	Pasir Gudang, Johor
20:45	Rezal Zambery Bin Yahya 42', 75'		Mohd Hafizuan Bin Salehuddin 32'	Stadium: Pasir Gudang Corporation Stadium

28 May 2011 21	Johor FC	0 – 1	Kedah	Pasir Gudang, Johor
20:45			Baddrol Bin Bakhtiar 75'	Stadium: Pasir Gudang Corporation Stadium

18 June 2011 22	Kuala Lumpur	1 – 2	Johor FC	Cheras, Kuala Lumpur
20:45	Khairul Anuar Shafie 84'		Azizan Baba 8', 35'	Stadium: Kuala Lumpur Stadium

21 June 2011 23	Johor FC	1 – 1	Perak	Pasir Gudang, Johor
20:45	Mohd Azizan Bin Baba 22'		Akhmal Rizal Bin Ahmad Rakhli 87'	Stadium: Pasir Gudang Corporation Stadium

2 July 2011 24	Johor FC	2 – 1	Pahang	Pasir Gudang, Johor
20:45	Mohammad Khairul Bin Ismail 24'; Mohamed Rashid Mohamad Aya 84'		Azamuddin Bin Mohd Akil 58'	Stadium: Pasir Gudang Corporation Stadium

6 July 2011 25	Harimau Muda	2 – 2	Johor FC	Shah Alam, Selangor
20:45				Stadium: Shah Alam Stadium

==== League table ====
Pos	Team	Pld	W	D	L	GF	GA	GD	Pts
5	Harimau Muda A	26	12	7	7	38	28	+10	43
6	Perak	26	10	10	6	31	24	+7	40
7	Johor FC	26	8	10	8	26	28	−2	34
8	Negeri Sembilan	26	8	8	10	29	32	−3	32
9	T–Team	26	9	4	13	35	40	−5	31

Updated to match(es) played on unknown. Source: FIFA
Rules for classification: 1) Points; 2) Goal difference; 3) Number of goals scored.

=== Malaysia FA Cup ===
==== Knockout stage ====
Win Draw Loss

Saturday 19 February First round	Johor FC	5–0	SPA	Stadium Jcorp Pasir Gudang
8:45 GMT	Shahrizal 9', 64'; Hamzani 25'; Mohd Syafuan 72'; Mohd Rashid Aya 87'			Attendance: 12,000

Friday 4 March Second round	Johor FC	0 - 1	Kelantan	Stadium JCORP Pasir Gudang
8:45 GMT			Badri Radzi 10'	Attendance: 1000

=== Malaysia Cup ===
==== Group stage ====
Team	Pld	W	D	L	GF	GA	GD	Pts
Kelantan FA	6	4	1	1	11	4	+7	13
(Kuala Lumpur) Felda United FC	6	3	1	2	6	4	+2	10
Johor FC	6	2	2	2	7	1	+6	8
Sarawak FA	6	1	0	5	2	11	−9	3

6 September 2011 1	Johor FC	0–2	Felda United	Pasir Gudang Corporation Stadium, Pasir Gudang
20:45		Report	Farderin Kadir 44', 68'	Attendance: 6,700

10 September 2011 2	Kelantan	2–1	Johor FC	Sultan Mohammad IV Stadium, Kota Bharu
20:45	Mohd Shakir Shaari 26'; Mohd Ramzul Zahini Adnan 88'	[https://i	Eddy Helmi Abdul Manan 11'

13 September 2011 3	Sarawak	0–1	Johor FC	Sarawak Stadium, Petra Jaya, Kuching
20:15		Report	Eddy Helmi Abdul Manan 48' (pen.)

18 September 2011 4	Felda United	1–1	Johor FC	MBPJ Stadium, Kelana Jaya
20:45	Mohd Azrul Ahmad 67'	Report	Mohd Izuan Jarudin 38'

24 September 2011 5	Johor FC	1–1	Kelantan	JCorp Stadium, Pasir Gudang
20:45	Mohd Akhmal Mohd Noor 2'	Report	Mohd Azamuddin Md Akil 8'

27 September 2011 6	Johor FC	3–1	Sarawak	JCorp Stadium, Pasir Gudang, Johor Bahru
20:45	Mohd Akhmal Mohd Nor 62', 71'; Mohd Ridwan M'aon 71'	Report	Bobby Gonzales (pen.)

== Club statistics ==
Includes all competitive matches. The list is sorted by shirt number when total goals are equal.

As of match played 5 October 2013

Rank	Pos.	No.	Player	Super League	FA Cup	Malaysia Cup	Total
1	FW	18	(Malaysia) Shahrizal Saad	5	2	0	7
2	MF	15	(Malaysia) Riduwan Maon	4	0	1	5
3	FW	19	(Malaysia) Rashid Aya	4	1	0	5
4	MF	23	(Malaysia) Rezal Zambery	3	0	0	3
5	MF	10	(Malaysia) Khairul Ismail	3	0	0	3
6	MF	8	(Malaysia) Azizan Baba	3	0	0	3
7	MF	9	(Malaysia) Eddy Helmi	1	0	2	3
8	MF	23	(Malaysia) Akhmal Mohd Noor	0	0	3	3
9	DF	6	(Malaysia) Izuan Jarudin	1	0	1	2
10	DF	3	(Malaysia) Hamzani Omar	0	1	0	1
11	MF	20	(Malaysia) Syafuan Riduwan	0	1	0	1
TOTALS				24	5	7	36
