= Bangladesh–Tunisia relations =

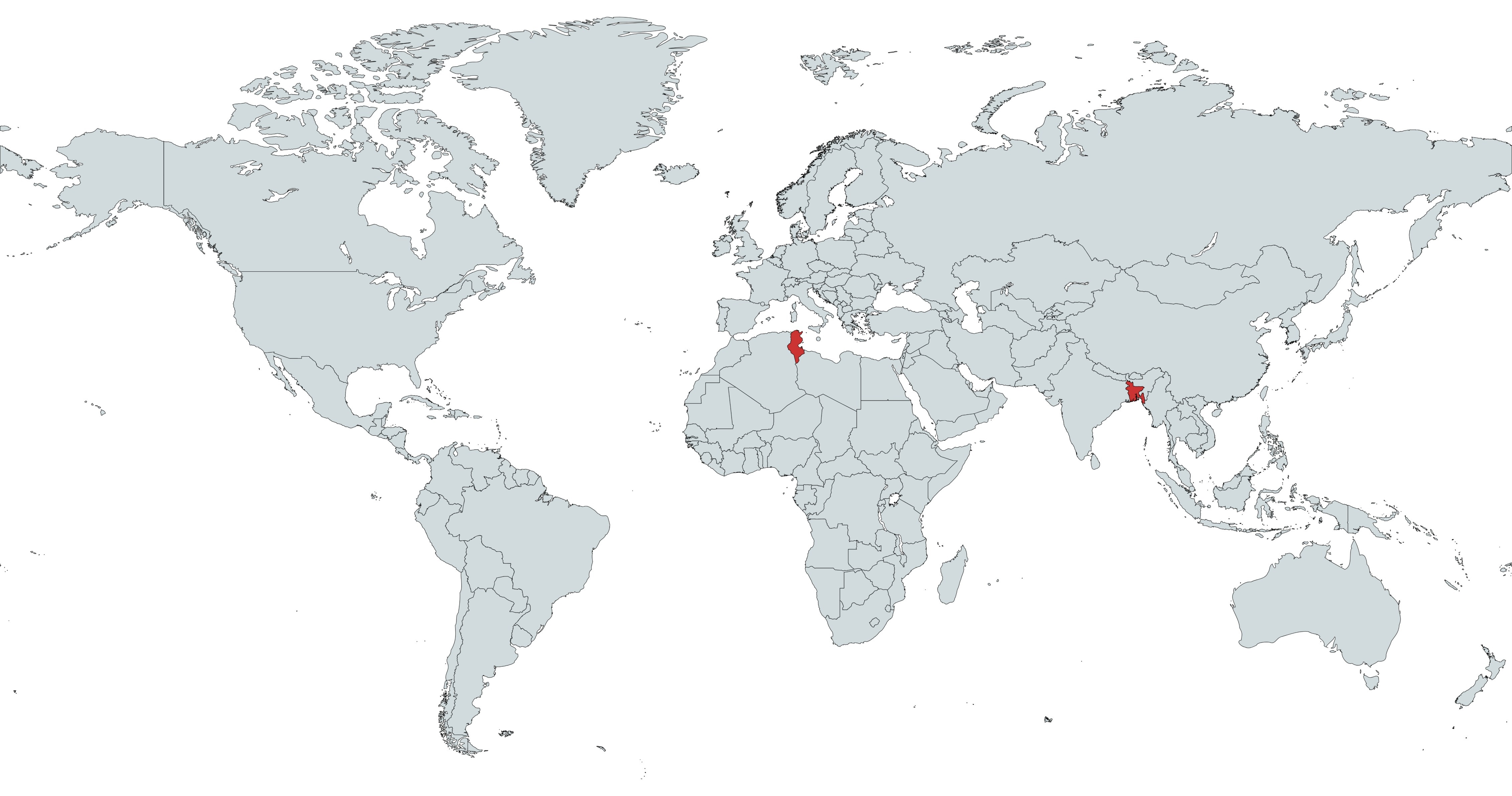

- Bangladesh: Tunisia

Diplomatic mission
- Non-resident Embassy of Bangladesh, Tripoli (accredited to Tunisia): Non-resident Embassy of Tunisia, Islamabad (accredited to Bangladesh)

Envoy
- Ambassador to Tunisia (non-resident) Major General Mohammad Habib Ullah, SGP, SPP, ndc, afwc, psc, M.Phil: Ambassador to Bangladesh (non-resident, resident in Islamabad) Javed Ahmed Umrani

Bangladesh–Tunisia relations refer to the bilateral relations between Bangladesh and Tunisia. Both countries are members of the Non-Aligned Movement and the Organisation of Islamic Cooperation.

== Diplomatic representation ==
Bangladesh does not maintain a resident diplomatic mission in Tunisia. The Embassy of Bangladesh in Tripoli, Libya, is concurrently accredited to Tunisia. As of 2026, the non‑resident ambassador to Tunisia (resident in Tripoli) is Major General Md. Habib Ullah, SGP, SPP, ndc, afwc, psc, M.Phil.

Tunisia does not have a resident embassy in Dhaka. According to the Tunisian Ministry of Foreign Affairs, the Tunisian Embassy in Islamabad, Pakistan, is concurrently accredited to Bangladesh. A non‑resident ambassador, based in Islamabad, represents Tunisian interests in Dhaka. As of 2026, the non‑resident Ambassador to Bangladesh is Javed Ahmed Umrani, the Ambassador of Pakistan to Tunisia.

== Economic cooperation ==
=== Fertiliser trade ===
Fertiliser trade is the most prominent sector of bilateral commerce. Bangladesh has been importing triple superphosphate (TSP) fertiliser from Tunisia’s Groupe Chimique Tunisien (GCT) on a government‑to‑government (G2G) basis since 2008. In February 2023, the Bangladesh Agricultural Development Corporation (BADC) signed an agreement with the Tunisian Chemical Group (GCT) in Tunis to import 150,000 tonnes of TSP fertilizer. BADC Chairman Abdullah Sazzad and GCT General Manager Mohammed Ridha Shalgam signed the agreement on behalf of their respective sides. Bangladesh has been importing TSP fertilizer from Tunisia on a government‑to‑government basis since 2008, and Tunisian TSP is in demand in Bangladesh due to its good quality. The agreement was renewed in April 2024 for another 150,000 tonnes, and further imports were approved in 2025 (25,000 tonnes) and 2026 (65,000 tonnes). In the 2025–26 fiscal year, Bangladesh set a target of importing 100,000 tonnes of TSP from Tunisia.

Tunisian TSP is considered good quality and is popular among Bangladeshi farmers.

=== Other trade and investment ===
In April 2026, the Bangladeshi conglomerate Dynamic Group Bangladesh expressed interest in investing in Tunisia in strategic sectors such as agriculture, energy and infrastructure, with the aim of using Tunisia as a gateway to the wider African market. In May 2026, Ambassador Bashar invited the Tunisian Union of Industry, Trade and Handicrafts (UTICA) to send a business delegation to the Bangladesh Investment Summit‑2025, and both sides agreed to work on a work programme to expand bilateral trade, notably in textiles, olive oil and dates.

== Migration and consular cooperation ==
Bangladesh and Tunisia have cooperated on several occasions to assist Bangladeshi migrants attempting irregular sea crossings from Libya. In June 2021, Tunisian authorities rescued 264 Bangladeshi migrants stranded in the Mediterranean after their boat broke down near Ben Guerdane. The survivors were placed in quarantine on the island of Djerba and later assisted by the International Organization for Migration and the Red Crescent.

== See also ==
- Foreign relations of Bangladesh
- Foreign relations of Tunisia
- Bangladesh–Africa relations
