= RUMC =

RUMC may refer to:

- RAJUK Uttara Model College, in Uttara, Dhaka, Bangladesh
- Richmond University Medical Center, a hospital in Staten Island, New York City, New York, United States
- Royal College of Surgeons in Ireland and University College Dublin Malaysia Campus, a private university in George Town, Penang, Malaysia
- Rush University Medical Center, in Chicago, Illinois
