= Sadnima Binte Noman =

Bangladeshi actress (born 1999)

- Born: January 18, 1999 (age 27); Dhaka, Bangladesh
- Citizenship: Bangladeshi
- Education: RAJUK Uttara Model College; North South University
- Occupations: Actress, model
- Years active: 2007–2016, 2025–present
- Known for: Role of 'Ira' in the OTT film Little Miss Chaos

Sadnima Binte Noman (born 18 January 1999) is a Bangladeshi television and OTT (over-the-top) actress and model. After debuting as a child artiste in television commercials in 2007, she went on to establish herself in leading roles across television dramas, music videos, and web films. She received widespread critical acclaim for portraying the central character 'Ira' in the 2025 psychological web film Little Miss Chaos.

== Early life and education ==
Sadnima was born in Dhaka, Bangladesh. She completed her secondary and higher secondary education at RAJUK Uttara Model College. She later graduated with a bachelor's degree from North South University. Before transitioning into full-time acting, she briefly worked at a private firm.

== Career ==
=== Early years as a child artiste (2007–2016) ===
Sadnima entered show business unexpectedly in 2007 at the age of seven when she was spotted near her residence during a shooting sequence. This led to her first breakthrough as a child model in a commercial directed by Amitabh Reza. She remained active for the next nine years, modeling for several prominent brands until 2016. She subsequently took a four-year hiatus to focus entirely on her academic studies.

=== Return to acting and OTT breakthrough (2025–present) ===
Following her break, she made her return to television in a supporting role in the 2025 Valentine's Day drama Moneri Ronge Rangiye. Her breakout television role came shortly after when she played the lead character 'Faria' in the Parth Sarkar-directed drama Goldfish, broadcast on Banglavision.

In October 2025, she made her debut in web films with Mahmuda Sultana's psychological thriller Little Miss Chaos, released on the OTT platform Chorki. Her performance as 'Ira' was praised by critics and audiences alike. Following this, she went on to star in multiple television dramas alongside co-star Khairul Basar, including Tomake Pawar Jonno, Agle Rekho Amay, Chayasongi, and Golpota Theke Jay. In 2026, she completed filming for her first mainstream romantic-action feature film, titled Rakshosh.

== Selected filmography ==
=== Web films ===
- Little Miss Chaos (2025) – as Ira (Chorki Original)

=== Feature films ===
- Rakshosh (2026)

=== Television dramas & music videos ===
- Moneri Ronge Rangiye (2025)
- Goldfish (2025)
- Tomake Pawar Jonno (2025)
- Agle Rekho Amay (2025)
- Chayasongi (2026)
- Bhul Namer Phul (2026)
- Khuji (Chorki Music Video)
- Mon Gorbor (Chorki Music Video)

== Awards and nominations ==
- Meril-Prothom Alo Awards – Nominated for Best Newcomer at the 27th Meril-Prothom Alo Awards (2025).

== Personal life ==
Sadnima prefers western-style attire and minimalist jewelry. She considers acclaimed Bangladeshi actress Jaya Ahsan to be her professional role model and inspiration.
