= Abdul Hafiz (general) =

Bangladeshi military officer

Abdul Hafiz BSP
- আবদুল হাফিজ
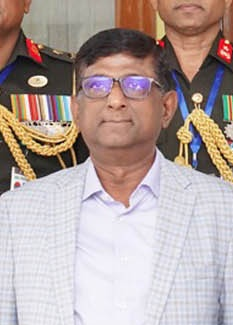
- Abdul Hafiz in 2024

Special Assistant to the Chief Adviser on Defence and National Solidarity Development
- In office 22 August 2024 – 17 February 2026
- Chief Adviser: Muhammad Yunus

Personal details
- Born: 6 November 1957 (age 68)
- Education: Bangladesh Military Academy; Rajshahi Cadet College
- Occupation: Military officer
- Awards: United Nations Medal; Bishishto Seba Padak (BSP)

Military service
- Allegiance: Bangladesh
- Branch/service: Bangladesh Army; Bangladesh Ansar
- Years of service: 1977–2014
- Rank: Lieutenant General
- Unit: East Bengal Regiment
- Commands: Chief of General Staff of Army Headquarters; Director General of Ansar and Village Defence Party; GOC of 33rd Infantry Division; Commandant of Bangladesh Military Academy; Commander of 26th Infantry Brigade
- Battles/wars: UNIKOM; MINUCI; UNOCI; MINURSO

Abdul Hafiz (born 6 November 1957) is a retired three star general of the Bangladesh Army and antecedent chief of the general staff. He served as the force commander in UN peacekeeping missions in Western Sahara and Côte d'Ivoire. He was a special assistant to the chief adviser of the interim government led by Muhammad Yunus in matters related to defense and national integrity development.

== Early life and education ==
Hafiz was born on 6 November 1957. He completed his Secondary School Certificate (SSC) and Higher Secondary Certificate (HSC) as part of the 6th batch at Rajshahi Cadet College, an institution known for producing senior military leadership in Bangladesh. He later joined the Bangladesh Military Academy in 1976 and was commissioned into the Bangladesh Army in May 1977 through the 4th Short Course in East Bengal Regiment.

Hafiz completed a master's degree in defence studies from Bangladesh National University. Over the course of his career, he received extensive military training both at home and abroad. Hafiz furthermore obtained courses on small and heavy infantry arms in China, an Advanced Infantry Officer's Qualification Course in the United States, and graduation from the Institut des hautes études de défense nationale in France. Hafiz is also a fluent speaker in English and French, which aided his participation in multinational military cooperation and training programs under the United Nations.

== Military career ==
Hafiz commander four infantry companies, one infantry battalion and was colonel administrative under logistics area at Dhaka Cantonment. He was promoted to brigadier general and commanded an infantry brigade at Jessore in 1999. He was commandant of the Bangladesh Military Academy from 2001 which he tenured until 2003. In 2005, he was promoted to major general and designated as the general officer commanding of 33rd Infantry Division and area commander Cumilla area. In 2008 Hafiz served as the director general of Bangladesh Ansar. In 2009 Hafiz was appointed as the chief of the general staff of the army. He was promoted to lieutenant general in February 2013 and went to leave per retirement in the following year as ambassador under the Ministry of Foreign Affairs.

=== United Nations peacekeeping missions ===
Hafiz was military liaison officer of UNIKOM in Zagreb from 1991 to 1992.

He participated a seminar on the operations of peacekeeping nations held at the Staff College, Camberley in October 1994. In 2006, he attended the 11th Committee on Defense Forum held in Tokyo.

==== UN mission in Côte d'Ivoire ====
Hafiz was the chief military liaison officer of United Nations Mission in Côte d'Ivoire (MINUCI) from 2003 to 2004. After then, he served as the deputy force commander of United Nations Operation in Côte d'Ivoire (UNOCI) from 2004 to 2005.

In his second mission in Côte d'Ivoire, he has appointed as force commander of UNOCI in 2010. He resigned from the post on 22 March 2011 after being accused of releasing secret information to a documentary director. The documentary highlights French interest in its African territory and its war. In his resignation speech, Abdul Hafiz said,

We're not in Côte d'Ivoire to kill Ivorians and I, I stop because I do not want to remain in the wrong.

==== UN mission in Western Sahara ====
After Côte d'Ivoire mission, again Hafiz was appointed as the force commander of the United Nations Mission for the Referendum in Western Sahara on 23 July 2011. Ban Ki-Moon stated in appointing him,

General Hafiz would bring to this new function, his large experience which he has acquired during his distinguished military career, a part of which was devoted to the operations aiming at maintaining peace in the United Nations.

He was highly appreciated on his tour of MINURSO. On the end of the tour, the official statement was, "The Secretary-General Ban Ki-moon is grateful to Major General Abdul Hafiz for his exemplary service and contribution to the work of MINURSO since July 2011."

== Political career ==
On 22 August 2024, Hafiz was appointed as a special assistant to the chief adviser, a post equivalent to that of an adviser, of the interim government led by Muhammad Yunus. He is responsible in assisting the chief adviser in matters related to defense and national integrity development.

== Award ==
Hafiz received many awards in his distinguished career. He was awarded the United Nations Medal for his service in MINURSO.
