= Mohammed Saidul Islam =

Major general of the Bangladesh Army

- Born: 27 March 1969 (age 57); Pabna, East Pakistan, Pakistan
- Military career
- Allegiance: Bangladesh
- Branch: Bangladesh Army
- Service years: 1989–2024
- Rank: Major General
- Unit: Corps of Engineers
- Commands: Commandant of Bangladesh Institute of Peace Support Operation Training; Commandant of Military Institute of Science and Technology; Chairman of Sena Kalyan Sangstha

Mohammed Saidul Islam, rcds, ndc, psc is a retired major general of the Bangladesh Army and the commandant of Bangladesh Institute of Peace Support Operation Training (BIPSOT). Prior to joining here, he was commandant of the Military Institute of Science and Technology. He has completed the RCDS course from the Royal College of Defence Studies (RCDS). Prior to that, he was the chairman of Sena Kalyan Sangstha.

== Career ==
Islam served as the director general of the National Identity Registration Wing of the Election Commission. Islam also served as the director of the Identification System for Enhancing Access to Services Project, phase two, of the National Identity Card of the Election Commission in 2020. He blocked the national identity cards of almost one thousand people for registering twice as voters.

On 21 March 2020, Islam inaugurated the shopping mall of Sena Kalyan Sangstha at Mohakhali DOHS.
