= Muhammad Hakimuzzaman =

Bangladesh Army major general

- Education: Bangladesh Military Academy
- Military career
- Allegiance: Bangladesh
- Branch: Bangladesh Army
- 20 December 1992: 1992 – present
- Rank: Major General
- Unit: Corps of Engineers
- Commands: Commandant of MIST; Adjutant General at Army Headquarters; Commander of 88th Infantry Brigade; CO of 18th Engineers Battalion
- Conflicts: UNAMSIL; MINURCAT
- Awards: Sena Gourab Padak (SGP)

Muhammad Hakimuzzaman (Note: SGP, ndc, afwc, psc) is a two-star officer of the Bangladesh Army, who is the commandant of Military Institute of Science and Technology. Before that he served as the adjutant general of Bangladesh Army.

== Education ==
Hakimuzzaman obtained his BS in civil engineering, and a Master's in Defence Studies (MDS) from Military Institute of Science and Technology (MIST) and National University respectively. He is currently pursuing his PhD from Jahangirnagar University.

== Military career ==
Hakimuzzaman was commissioned from the 27th BMA Long Course on 20 December 1992 in the Corps of Engineers. He has served as the commanding officer of 18th Engineers Battalion and commander of 88th Infantry Brigade. He was pioneering chief operations officer of the Army War Games Centre.

He served as adjutant general at the Bangladesh Army HQ. In addition to which, he is also the current vice-chairman of Trust Bank. As adjutant general, he most notably announced the trial of 15 army officers for human rights violations during the Hasina regime. Regarding the judicial process, he stated: "The Bangladesh Army stands for justice. There will be no compromise with fairness."

In March 2026, he was made Commandant of the Military Institute of Science and Technology.
