= Mohd Khairul Anuar Ramli =

Malaysian footballer (born 1983)

Khairul Anuar
Personal information
- Full name: Mohd Khairul Anuar Ramli
- Date of birth: 31 March 1983 (age 43)
- Place of birth: Kelantan, Malaysia
- Position: Defender

Team information
- Current team: PKNS FC

Senior career*
Years	Team	Apps	(Gls)
2001	Kelantan JKR		
2002	Kelantan TNB		
2003–2004	Kelantan FA		
2005	Selangor Public Bank		
2005–2006	Kelantan FA		
2006–2008	Perlis FA		
2009–	PKNS FC		
- * Club domestic league appearances and goals

Mohd Khairul Anuar bin Ramli (born 31 March 1983) is a Malaysian professional football player currently playing for PKNS FC in the Malaysian Premier League as a defender. He was formerly with Perlis FA before released to PKNS FC.

== See also ==
- Football in Malaysia
- List of football clubs in Malaysia
