= Mohammad Habib Ullah =

Bangladeshi Army general and diplomat

- মোহাম্মদ হাবিব উল্লাহ

Ambassador of Bangladesh to Libya
- Incumbent
- Assumed office 28 August 2025
- Preceded by: Abul Hasnat Mohammad Khairul Bashar

Military service
- Allegiance: Bangladesh
- Branch/service: Bangladesh Army
- Rank: Major general

Mohammad Habib Ullah is a Bangladesh Army major general and the incumbent Bangladesh ambassador to Libya since August 2025. He is also a non-resident ambassador to Tunisia.

== Career ==
Ullah served as the chairman of Sena Kalyan Sangstha, a government organization operated by Bangladesh Armed Forces.

Ullah presented his credentials to Taher Al-Baour, then foreign minister of Libya on 18 February 2026 and to Mohamed al-Menfi, the head of Libya’s Presidential Council, on 13 June.
