= Mohd Irfan Abdul Ghani =

Malaysian footballer

Irfan Abdul Ghani
Personal information
- Full name: Mohamad Irfan Bin Abdul Ghani
- Date of birth: 17 June 1989 (age 37)
- Place of birth: Johor, Malaysia
- Height: 1.76 m (5 ft 9 1/2 in)
- Positions: Left back; centre back

Youth career
- 2006: Johor President's Cup Team

Senior career*
Years	Team	Apps	(Gls)
2007	Johor FA	20	(0)
2008	Harimau Muda	10	(0)
2009–2010	Johor FA	5	(0)
2011	Johor FC	3	(0)
2012	Felda United FC	7	(2)
2013	Darul Takzim FC	12	(3)
2014	T-Team F.C.	16	(3)
2015	Johor Darul Takzim II	18	(0)
2016	Perak FA	1	(0)

International career^{‡}
2007–2008	Malaysia U21	5	(0)
- * Club domestic league appearances and goals as of September 07, 2016 ‡ National team caps and goals as of September 07, 2016

Irfan Abdul Ghani (born 17 June 1989 in Johor) is a Malaysian footballer who plays as a defender.
