= Khairul Ismail =

Malaysian footballer (born 1981)

Personal information
- Full name: Mohd Khairul Bin Ismail
- Date of birth: 11 December 1981 (age 44)
- Place of birth: Johor, Malaysia
- Height: 1.72 m (5 ft 7 1/2 in)
- Positions: Defender; midfielder

Team information
- Current team: Kedah U23 (Head coach)

Youth career
- 2000: Johor

Senior career*
Years	Team	Apps	(Gls)
2001–2009	Johor		
2006	→ Kedah (loan)		
2010–2012	Johor FC	35	(6)
2013	Johor	17	(1)
2014–2017	Felda United	28	(1)

Managerial career
- 2023: Kedah U21
- 2024–: Kedah U23
- * Club domestic league appearances and goals as of 1 November 2017

Mohd Khairul Bin Ismail (born 11 December 1981, in Johor) is a former Malaysian professional footballer who plays as a center back and midfielder. He is currently the head coach of Kedah Darul Aman Under-23 team.

== Club career ==
=== Kedah FA (loan) ===
Khairul gained a limelight during his short spell with Kedah backed in 2004 Malaysia Cup Campaign. He scored the only goal in second leg semi final in Darul Aman Stadium that brought Kedah to final. His header helped Kedah to reached final after 11 years of awaiting. Unfortunately, he did not offered permanent moved and return to Johor. Since Kedah planned to rebuild new squad for upcoming Malaysia Premier League.

Ismail formerly played with Johor FA and Johor FC before signing with Felda United in 2014.
