= Abul Hasnat Mohammad Khairul Bashar =

Bangladesh general

- Born: 27 August 1970 (age 56); Kushtia, East Pakistan, Pakistan
- Education: Bangladesh Military Academy
- Military career
- Allegiance: Bangladesh
- Branch: Bangladesh Army; Border Guard Bangladesh
- Service years: 1989 – 2025
- Rank: Major General
- Service number: BA - 3599
- Unit: East Bengal Regiment
- Commands: Ambassador of Bangladesh to Libya; GOC of 17th Infantry Division; Deputy Military Secretary at Army Headquarters; Commander of 222nd Infantry Brigade; Additional DG of Border Guard Bangladesh

Abul Hasnat Mohammad Khairul Bashar (born 27 August 1970) is a retired two-star officer of the Bangladesh Army who served as the ambassador of Bangladesh to Libya from June 2023 to November 2025. Prior to this appointment, he was the GOC of the 17th Infantry Division and area commander of the Sylhet Area. He served as additional director general of Border Guards Bangladesh.

== Early life ==
Bashar was born on 27 August 1970 in Kushtia District, East Pakistan, now Bangladesh. He graduated from Defence Services Command and Staff College and the National Defence College, Bangladesh.

== Career ==
On 23 June 1989, Bashar received his commission in the Infantry Corps of the Bangladesh Army from the 20th BMA long course.

From 1995 to 1996, Bashar served in the United Nations Iraq–Kuwait Observation Mission. He served at the headquarters of the African Union Mission in Sudan during 2006–2007.

Bashar was the additional director general of Bangladesh Border Guards in 2015. He served under Director General General Aziz Ahmed. According to a 2021 investigation by Al-Jazeera, titled "All the Prime Minister's Men", Bashar was forced to help his former commander, General Aziz Ahmed, by signing as a witness in a delivery agent agreement prepared by Haris Ahmed. This had been denied by the government of Bangladesh.

In an interview with Prothom Alo regarding the investigation by Al-Jazeera, Bashar stated that his signature on a document prepared by Haris Ahmed seems to be a forgery. Though the signature is somehow similar, but it does not match his signature completely. His name is spelled and written wrongly. He does not recall signing any such document, nor does he recall anyone asking him to sign such a document.

Bashar was senior directing staff (army-3) of the National Defence College. On 9 May 2023, he was appointed the ambassador of Bangladesh to Libya.

== Personal life ==
Bashar is married to Mahfuza Akther.
