= Military Institute of Science and Technology =

Public engineering institution in Bangladesh

- মিলিটারি ইনস্টিটিউট অব সায়েন্স অ্যান্ড টেকনোলজি
- Crest of MIST
- Motto: প্রগতির জন্য প্রযুক্তি
- Motto in English: Technology for Advancement
- Type: Public Engineering, Research
- Established: 1998; 28 years ago
- Accreditation: Institution of Engineers, Bangladesh; Institute of Architects Bangladesh
- Academic affiliations: Bangladesh University of Professionals
- Chancellor: President Mirza Fakhrul Islam Alamgir
- Superintendent: Bangladesh Armed Forces
- Commandant: Major General Muhammad Hakimuzzaman
- Academic staff: 350
- Administrative staff: 400
- Students: 4050
- Undergraduates: 3400
- Postgraduates: 600
- Doctoral students: 50
- Location: Mirpur Cantonment, Dhaka, 1216, Bangladesh
- Campus: 50 acres (20 ha); Urban
- Demonym: MISTians
- Colors: Green
- Website: mist.ac.bd

University rankings

Global – Overall
- THE World: 1501+ (2026)

Global – Science and engineering
- THE Engineering: 1001-1250 (2026)

Military Institute of Science and Technology (MIST) is a public engineering institution in Dhaka, Bangladesh. It is located at Mirpur Cantonment and is a government engineering and technological research institution under the Ministry of Defence. The Government of Bangladesh established MIST in 1998 for offering programmes with B.Sc., M.Sc., M.Phil. and PhD degrees in engineering. MIST is a PhD granting public research university in Bangladesh specialized in engineering.

MIST is the only government engineering institution of the Ministry of Defence of Bangladesh. MIST conducts twelve engineering and architecture departments under four faculties.Major departments have achieved accreditation from the Board of Accreditation for Engineering & Technical Education (BAETE), Institution of Engineers, Bangladesh (IEB) and accreditation work for other departments is ongoing.

== History ==
On 19 April 1998, the then Prime Minister Sheikh Hasina established MIST for studying engineering in BSc level at Mirpur Cantonment, Dhaka. Academic programs were launched in 31 January 1999. The initial batches included only selected military students. However, feeling the necessity of spreading quality engineering education, the authority decided to admit civil students (both male and female) and from 2002, civilian students were admitted in different departments through passing an admission test. Foreign students were admitted for the first time in session 2008-09.

The maiden department of the institute was the Civil Engineering department, which started functioning in 1999. In 2001, Computer Science & Engineering (CSE) department was established. Mechanical Engineering (ME) department and Electrical & Electronic Engineering department (EEE) which was later renamed as Electrical, Electronic & Communication Engineering (EECE) department were established in the year 2003. Aeronautical engineering department was introduced in 2009. In 2013, naval architecture and marine engineering started its operation. Next three years, other six departments started the academic activities with full swing. MIST started its Masters program in different disciplines from 2012 and MPhil/PhD from year 2014.

== Procedure of admission ==
The undergraduate admission process at MIST has several steps. First, students are screened based on their grade point average (GPA) in HSC or equivalent examinations and SSC or equivalent examinations. Students who have passed in minimum five subjects in GCE O-Level and three subjects (mathematics, physics and chemistry) in A-Level, obtaining minimum C-grades in all subjects are also eligible for the admission test. Prior to 2020, almost 10,000 candidates are selected from approximately 20,000-20,500 applicants to sit for the MIST written admission test. However, in recent years, the approximately 22,000-23,500 applicants among the total applicants have been allowed to sit for the admission test based on the best GPA & marks holder in HSC exam in the above-mentioned subjects (Math, Physics, Chemistry and English). Afterward, the distribution of 810 seats is based on their merit positions in the written exam and students' subject choice list. For Bangladeshi undergraduate students, 40% seats are allotted for children of Military personnels (Military Quota) and rest of seats (60%) are available for general students, freedom fighter quota, and trivial quota. The acceptance rate at MIST for general students (not from military family) in undergraduate level is 2.43%. This calculation assumes a total of 20,000 applicants (general students) allowed to take part in the admission test against 60% of 810 available seats. This highly competitive acceptance rate (2.43%) positions MIST as one of the leading public engineering universities in Bangladesh. Moreover, foreign students may be admitted against a reserved quota of 3% of overall vacancies available (6% of civil seats). Vacancies will be offered to countries through Armed Forces Division (AFD), Prime Minister's Office (PMO), of the Government of Bangladesh. Admission to Ph.D. and M.Phil. programs requires a master's degree from relevant branch from a recognized university. Admission to a Master's program requires a bachelor's degree in engineering from a recognized institution with a minimum CGPA of 3.00 out of 4.00. Admission is based on written admission test & interview/viva voce on the relevant departments. Admission is highly competitive in postgraduate programs as only few aspirants are selected every year from a large pool of applicants.

== Academics ==
=== Faculties and departments ===
Academic activities are undertaken by sixteen departments under six faculties. Twelve departments offer undergraduate programs. In 2026, "URP", "Mathematics and Data science" and "Chemistry and Nanoscience " have been opened.

Faculty of Civil Engineering	Faculty of Electrical & Computer Engineering	Faculty of Mechanical Engineering	Faculty of Biomedical and Nuclear	Faculty of Architecture and Planning	Faculty of Science and Humanities
Department of Civil Engineering; Department of Civil, Environmental, Water Resources & Coastal Engineering; Department of Petroleum & Mining Engineering	Department of Electrical, Electronic & Communication Engineering; Department of Computer Science and Engineering	Department of Mechanical Engineering; Department of Aeronautical Engineering; Department of Naval Architecture and Marine Engineering; Department of Industrial and Production Engineering	Department of Nuclear Science & Engineering; Department of Biomedical Engineering	Department of Architecture; Department of URP	Mathematics; Chemistry; Science and Humanities

=== Postgraduate programs ===
Eight departments of MIST offer postgraduate courses(M.Sc./M.Engg., Ph.D.) and other departments of Science and Engineering Faculty offer M.Sc..

1. Civil Engineering [Structure/Transportation/Environment/Water Resource/Geotechnical Engineering] (M.Sc./M.Engg., Ph.D.)
2. Electrical, Electronics & Communication Engineering [Power/Electronics/Communication] (M.Sc./M.Engg., Ph.D.)
3. Computer Science & Engineering (M.Sc./M.Engg., Ph.D.)
4. Mechanical Engineering (M.Sc./M.Engg., Ph.D.)
5. Naval Architecture and Marine Engineering (M.Sc./M.Engg., Ph.D.)
6. Aeronautical Engineering (M.Sc./M.Engg., Ph.D.)
7. Nuclear Science & Engineering (M.Sc./M.Engg., Ph.D.)
8. Biomedical Engineering (M.Sc./M.Engg., Ph.D.)
9. M.Sc.Engg./M.Engg. in Petroleum and Mining Engineering (PME)
10. M.Sc.Engg./M.Engg. in Industrial and Production Engineering (IPE)
11. M.Sc.Engg./M.Engg. in Cyber Security
12. M.Arch. - Master of Architecture
