= RAJUK Uttara Model College =

Co-educational college in Dhaka, Bangladesh

Rajuk Uttara Model College
- রাজউক উত্তরা মডেল কলেজ
- Logo of RAJUK Uttara Model College

Location
- Shahjalal Avenue, Sector-6, Uttara; Dhaka 1230; Bangladesh; 23.8704°N 90.4021°E

Information
- Other names: RUMC; RAJUK College
- Former name: Uttara Model College
- Motto: Education for Humanization (মানুষ হওয়ার জন্য শিক্ষা)
- Established: 1994; 32 years ago
- Founder: Government of Bangladesh
- School board: Dhaka Board of Intermediate and Secondary Education
- Authority: Board of Governors
- Chairman: Rehana Parveen
- Principal: Brigadier General Saiful Haque Ahmed, PSC, NDC
- Grades: 6–12
- Gender: Co-educational
- Language: Bengali and English
- Schedule type: Morning & Day
- Hours in school day: 5 and 5
- Campus size: 4.5 acres (18,000 m^{2})
- Campus type: Urban
- Publication: Anupranon (অনুপ্রাণন) Rajuk Bulletin
- Website: www.rajukcollege.edu.bd

RAJUK Uttara Model College (RUMC) (Bengali: রাজউক উত্তরা মডেল কলেজ) is a co-educational secondary school and intermediate college (grades VI-XII) in Uttara, Dhaka, Bangladesh. It is one of the country's most renowned educational institutions offering secondary & higher secondary education. It is situated about a kilometer north of Shahjalal International Airport. Established in 1994, the institution teaches its students in Bengali and English under the Bangladeshi national curriculum. It has two recurring schedules: Morning and Day. Although it is said to be an autonomous school and college with an EIIN number of 108573, it operates under the directives of the national government.

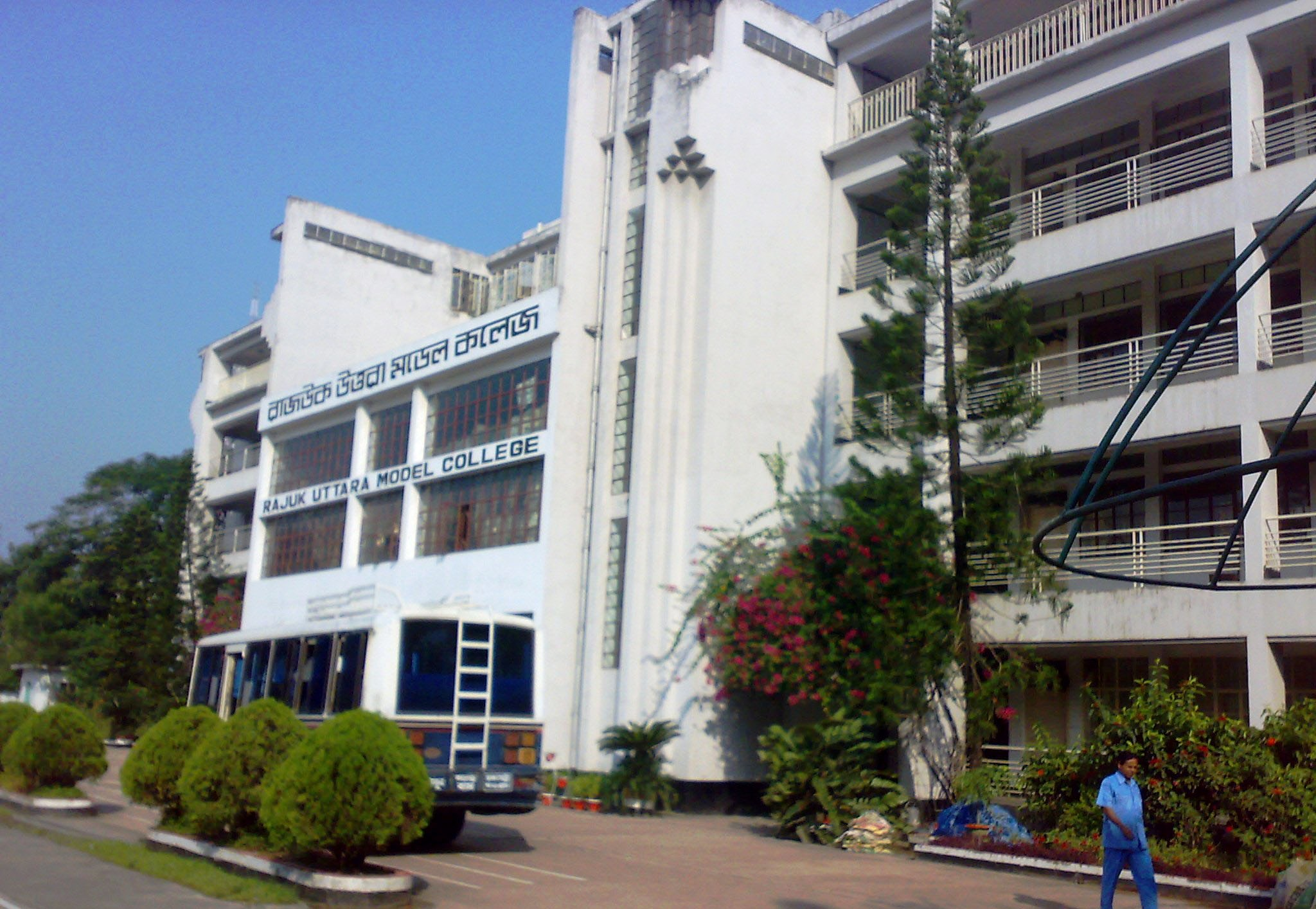
Main academic building of RUMC

== History ==
RUMC was set up on an area of about 4.5 acres (18,000 m^{2}) at Uttara in 1994 under the control and management of the Ministry of Education. Rajdhani Unnayan Kartripakkha or RAJUK provided land for the school.

The construction of the main academic building was completed in 1994 and the college section was formally inaugurated in the academic year 1994–95 by former Prime-Minister of Bangladesh, Khaleda Zia. Due to acute shortage of infrastructural facilities another development project for construction of a new building was taken up in 1995 which was completed in two phases and the campus took its present shape in 2001. The new campus of Rajuk Uttara Model College has been built in the same premises. It started its journey from 2014.

The college being an autonomous institution is run by the control of an autonomous board of governors headed by the Secretary, Ministry of Education. Although the school commenced with only one shift (morning shift), later in 2003 a day shift was launched to cope with the growing number of students.

== Admission ==
Admission to Rajuk Uttara Model College is highly competitive, due to it being one of the most reputed colleges in the country. Applicants have to pass a written test to qualify. The admission procedure for the eleventh grade starts soon after the publication of results from the Secondary School Certificate (SSC) exam, with admission based on SSC exam results.

=== Academic performance ===
In 2008, the Dhaka Board of Education recognized and celebrated RUMC for its performance on the HSC examinations. RUMC also received the Best School award in the National Debate Festival 2008.

== Notable alumni ==
- Major Sinha Mohammed Rashed Khan, victim of extrajudicial killing
- Nusrat Faria Mazhar, film actress

== Gallery ==
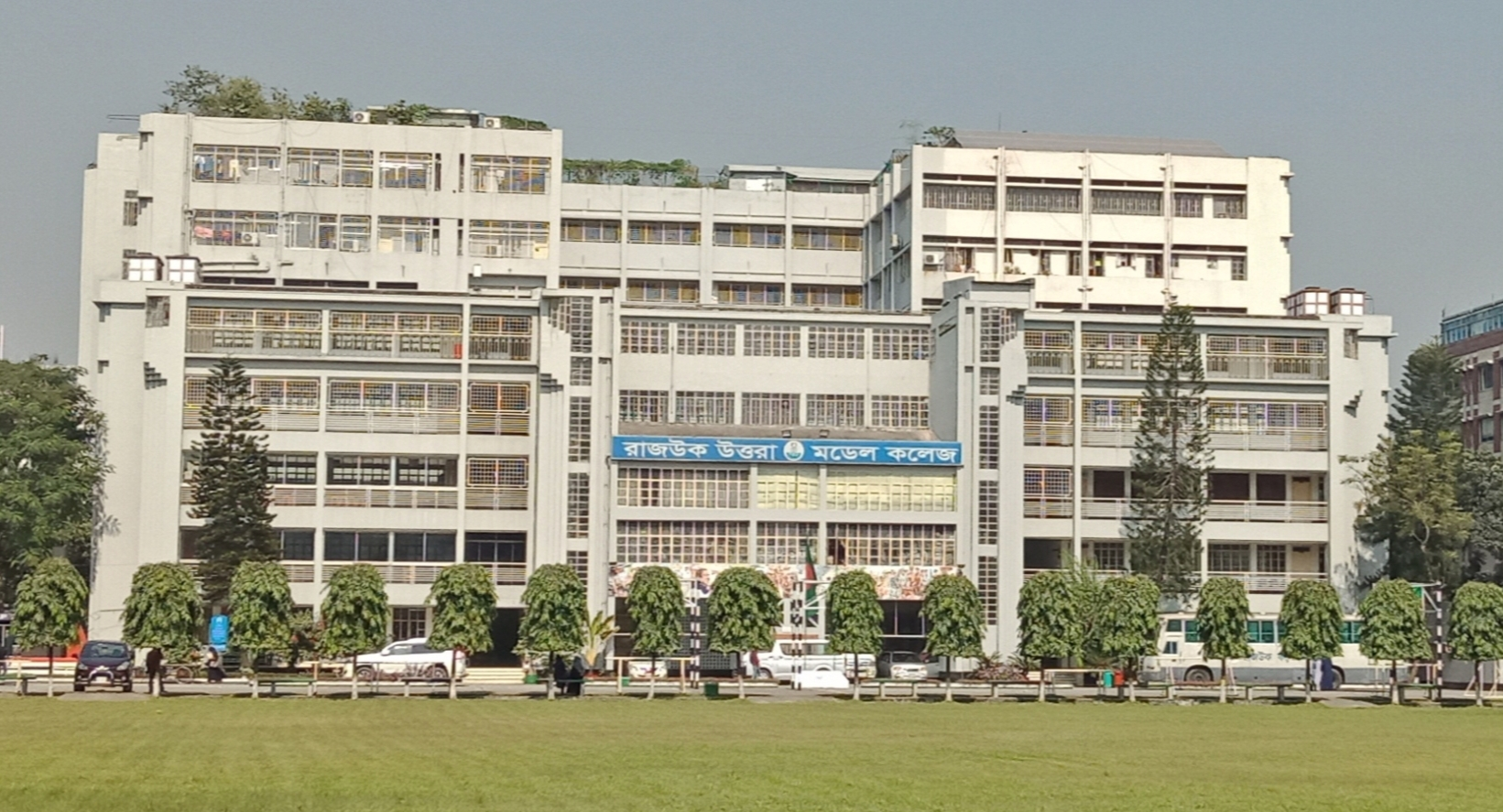
The main academic building of RUMC, used by class 9-12 grade students, also called the senior building.

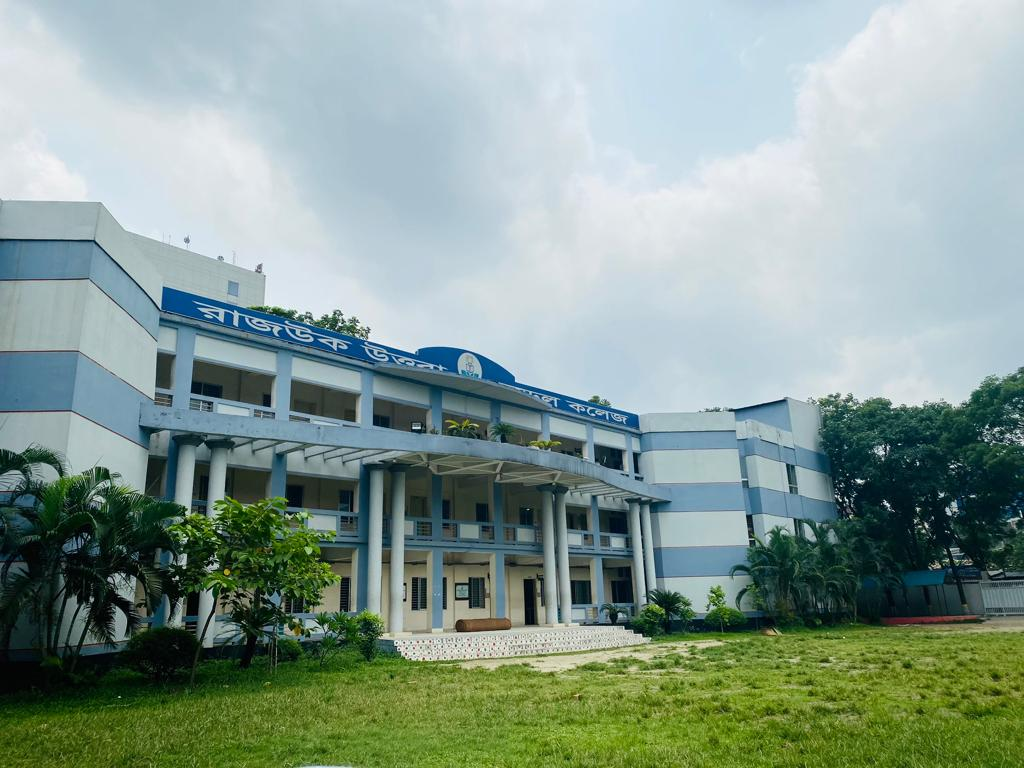
The academic building for the 6-8 grade students, also called the junior building.
