= 2021 Selangor F.C. season =

2021 season of Malaysian association football club

Selangor
2021 season
- Chairman: Tengku Amir Shah
- Manager: Mahfizul Rusydin
- Head coach: Karsten Neitzel
- Stadium: MBPJ Stadium
- Super League: 5th
- FA Cup: Cancelled (Note: Due to the COVID-19 pandemic in Malaysia, the tournament was cancelled immediately by MFL.)
- Malaysia Cup: Quarter-finals
- Top goalscorer: League: (26 goals); Ifedayo Olusegun; All: (27 goals); Ifedayo Olusegun
- Highest home attendance: 3,146; Malaysia Cup; Selangor vs Kuala Lumpur City (14 November 2021)
- Lowest home attendance: 1,300; Super League; Selangor vs Kedah Darul Aman (6 April 2021)
- Average home league attendance: 396
- Biggest win: 6–0 v Sabah (A) (5 September 2021); Super League
- Biggest defeat: 1–3 v Terengganu (A) (9 March 2021); Super League; 1–3 v Johor Darul Ta'zim (H) (28 July 2021); Super League; 1–3 v Terengganu (H) (7 November 2021); Malaysia Cup
Home colours	Away colours	Third colours

The 2021 season is Selangor's 16th season in the Super League and their 36th consecutive season in the top flight of Malaysia football. The club also participates in the Malaysia Cup and will also participate in the FA Cup. Selangor played the entire season at the MBPJ Stadium, while the Shah Alam Stadium was undergoing a major renovation and rebuilding work.

== Review ==
Selangor make a start of the season with recruit a new coach from Germany, Karsten Neitzel, after Technical Director Michael Feichtenbeiner only remains with the team as coach-interim in the end of last season after departure B. Sathianathan from the club. Selangor will begin the season on 6 March 2021.

This season, Selangor chose the MBPJ Stadium or Petaling Jaya Stadium as the home ground for this season's Malaysian league competition after the club's original home ground, Shah Alam Stadium was closed to undergo major renovation and rebuilding work which was prolonged for an extended period of time.

For the pre-season and friendlies, the club can proceed, if COVID-19 pandemic decreases in their country or also to waits for the government's decision on whether the friendly match is allowed or not.

On 26 January 2021, the Malaysia Football League (MFL) has cancelled the 2021 FA Cup and deferred the start of the Malaysian League (M-League) to 5 March 2021 due to the enforcement of the Movement Control Order (MCO), including cause of increasing case due to COVID-19 pandemic hit the country.

== Squad information ==
=== First-team squad ===
Squad No.	Name	Nationality	Position(s)	Date of birth (age)	Noted
Goalkeepers
1	Khairulazhan Khalid	(Malaysia)	GK	7 November 1989 (aged 32)	
22	Tauffiq Ar Rasyid	(Malaysia)	GK	14 December 1995 (aged 25)	
25	Sikh Izhan Nazrel	(Malaysia)	GK	23 March 2002 (aged 19)	(Note: Promoted from Reserve Team.)
Defenders
4	Ashmawi Yakin	(Malaysia)	RB / RWB / CB	1 January 1994 (aged 27)	
13	R. Dinesh	(Malaysia)	LB / LWB	13 February 1998 (aged 23)	
14	Zikri Khalili	(Malaysia)	LB / LWB	25 June 2002 (aged 19)	(Note: Promoted from Reserve Team.)
20	Syahmi Safari	(Malaysia)	RB / RWB / RM	5 February 1998 (aged 23)	
21	Safuwan Baharudin	(Singapore)	CB / DM / CM / CF	22 September 1991 (aged 30)	
26	A. Namathevan	(Malaysia)	RB / RWB	26 July 1996 (aged 25)	
31	Tim Heubach	(Germany)	CB	12 April 1988 (aged 33)	
44	Sharul Nazeem	(Malaysia)	CB	16 November 1999 (aged 22)	(Note: Promoted from Reserve Team.)
Midfielders
5	Manuel Konrad	(Germany)	DM / CM	14 April 1988 (aged 33)	
6	K. Sarkunan	(Malaysia)	DM / CM	4 August 1996 (aged 25)	
8	Nik Sharif	(Malaysia)	CM / AM / LM / RM	30 May 1997 (aged 24)	
11	Wan Zack Haikal	(Malaysia)	LM / RM / CAM	28 January 1991 (aged 30)	
18	Halim Saari	(Malaysia)	DM / CM	14 November 1994 (aged 27)	
19	Hakim Hassan	(Malaysia)	CM / AM / LW / LM	2 October 1991 (aged 30)	
23	Oliver Buff	(Switzerland)	AM / CM / DM	3 August 1992 (aged 29)	
29	Mukhairi Ajmal	(Malaysia)	CM / DM	7 November 2001 (aged 20)	(Note: Promoted from Reserve Team.)
77	Aliff Haiqal	(Malaysia)	CM / LM / RM	11 July 2000 (aged 21)	(Note: Promoted from Reserve Team.)
88	Brendan Gan	(Malaysia) (Australia)	CM / DM / AM	3 June 1988 (aged 33)	
Forwards
7	Sean Selvaraj	(Malaysia)	RW / LW / RM / LM	11 April 1996 (aged 25)	
10	Shahrel Fikri	(Malaysia)	ST / CF / LW	17 October 1994 (aged 27)	
12	Ifedayo Olusegun	(Nigeria) (Bahrain)	ST / LW / RW	14 January 1991 (aged 30)	
27	Danial Asri	(Malaysia)	LW / LM / CF	1 April 2000 (aged 21)	(Note: Promoted from Reserve Team.)
Out on loan
3	Rodney Celvin	(Malaysia) (Ghana)	CB	25 November 1996 (aged 24)	

=== Reserve Team Squad ===
Squad No.	Name	Nationality	Position(s)	Date of birth (age)	Noted
Selangor II, III & IV
—	Azrin Afiq	(Malaysia)	RB	1 January 2002 (aged 19)	
—	Azizul Baharuddin	(Malaysia)	ST / CF	27 February 1998 (aged 23)	
30	Hein Htet Aung	(Myanmar)	RW / LW	5 October 2001 (aged 20)	
32	Saiful Iskandar	(Malaysia)	DM / CM	29 March 1999 (aged 22)	
33	Jordan Ayimbila	(Ghana)	LB / CB	14 February 2001 (aged 20)	(Note: On loan from Accra Lions.)
34	Alex Agyarkwa	(Ghana)	CM	18 July 2000 (aged 21)	
35	Shivan Pillay	(Malaysia)	CB / DM / CM	7 December 2000 (aged 20)	
37	George Attram	(Ghana)	ST / CF	9 September 2000 (aged 21)	
38	Aidil Azuan	(Malaysia)	LB	25 February 2001 (aged 20)	
55	Harith Haiqal	(Malaysia)	CB / DM	22 June 2002 (aged 19)	

== Transfers ==
21 November 2020 – 5 March 2021

=== Transfers in ===
Date	No.	Pos.	Name	Age	Moving from	Type	Transfer fee	Team	Ref.
30 November 2020	—	DF	(Malaysia) Amirul Ashraf	22	(Malaysia) UiTM	Loan return	N/A	Reserve Team	N/A
7 December 2020	10	FW	(Malaysia) Shahrel Fikri	26	(Malaysia) Perak	Contract expired	Free transfer	First Team	
12 December 2020	31	DF	(Germany) Tim Heubach	32	(Israel) Maccabi Netanya	Contract expired	Free transfer	First Team	
15 December 2020	13	DF	(Malaysia) R. Dinesh	22	(Malaysia) Pahang	Contract expired	Free transfer	First Team	
19 December 2020	8	MF	(Malaysia) Nik Sharif	23	(Malaysia) Pahang	Contract expired	Free transfer	First Team	
26 January 2021	23	MF	(Switzerland) Oliver Buff	28	Free agent	N/A	Free transfer	First Team	
10 February 2021	30	MF	(Myanmar) Hein Htet Aung	19	(Myanmar) Hantharwady United	Contract expired	Free transfer	Reserve Team	
22 February 2021	5	MF	(Germany) Manuel Konrad	32	Unattached (Note: Most recently played for KFC Uerdingen 05.)	N/A	Free transfer	First Team	

=== Transfers out ===
Date	No.	Pos.	Name	Age	Moving to	Type	Transfer fee	Team	Ref.
30 November 2020	—	DF	(Malaysia) Amirul Ashraf	22	(Malaysia) Perak II	Contract expired	Free transfer	Reserve Team	
30 November 2020	—	GK	(Malaysia) Haziq Ridwan	24	Free agent	Contract expired	Free transfer	Reserve Team	
30 November 2020	—	FW	(Malaysia) Badrul Amin	23	Free agent	Contract expired	Free transfer	Reserve Team	
30 November 2020	—	DF	(Malaysia) Amirul Haziq	22	Free agent	Contract expired	Free transfer	Reserve Team	
30 November 2020	—	MF	(Malaysia) Faizzudin Abidin	24	Free agent	Contract expired	Free transfer	Reserve Team	
30 November 2020	5	DF	(Australia) Taylor Regan	32	(Malaysia) Sarawak United	Contract expired	Free transfer	First Team	
30 November 2020	8	MF	(Malaysia) Khyril Muhymeen	33	(Malaysia) Petaling Jaya City	Released	Free transfer	First Team	
30 November 2020	10	FW	(Spain) Rufino Segovia	35	Free agent	Contract expired	Free transfer	First Team	
30 November 2020	19	DF	(Malaysia) K. Prabakaran	29	(Malaysia) Petaling Jaya City	Contract expired	Free transfer	First Team	
30 November 2020	22	MF	(Malaysia) Syazwan Zainon	31	(Malaysia) Kedah	Contract expired	Free transfer	First Team	
30 November 2020	23	DF	(Malaysia) Nicholas Swirad	29	(Thailand) Nongbua Pitchaya	Released	Free transfer	First Team	
30 November 2020	27	DF	(Malaysia) M. Tamil Maran	23	(Malaysia) Petaling Jaya City	Released	Free transfer	First Team	
30 November 2020	30	GK	(Malaysia) Farizal Harun	34	(Malaysia) Kelantan	Released	Free transfer	First Team	
30 November 2020	35	MF	(Malaysia) Zahril Azri	21	(Malaysia) Sarawak United	Released	Free transfer	Reserve Team	
30 November 2020	36	DF	(Malaysia) Anwar Ibrahim	21	(Malaysia) Kuala Lumpur United	Released	Free transfer	Reserve Team	
30 November 2020	50	FW	(Brazil) Sandro	37	(Malaysia) Sarawak United	Contract expired	Free transfer	First Team	

=== Loans in ===
Date	No.	Pos.	Name	Age	Loaned from	Type	On loan until	Transfer fee	Team	Ref.
20 January 2021	33	DF	(Ghana) Jordan Ayimbila	19	(Ghana) Accra Lions	Loan	End of season	N/A	Reserve Team	
20 January 2021	37	FW	(Ghana) George Attram	20	(Ghana) Accra Lions	Loan	End of season	N/A	Reserve Team	
11 June 2021	34	MF	(Ghana) Alex Agyarkwa	20	(Ghana) Accra Lions	Loan	End of season	N/A	Reserve Team	

=== Loans out ===
Date	No.	Pos.	Name	Age	Loaned to	Type	On loan until	Transfer fee	Team	Ref.
16 December 2020	—	DF	(Malaysia) Quentin Cheng	21	(Malaysia) Penang	Loan	End of season	N/A	Reserve Team	
20 December 2020	3	DF	(Malaysia) Rodney Celvin	24	(Malaysia) Kedah Darul Aman	Loan	End of season	N/A	First Team	

== Pre-season and friendlies ==
20 February 2021 Friendly	Selangor (Malaysia)	1–0	(Malaysia) PDRM	Shah Alam, Selangor
	Shahrel (?)	Report		Stadium: FAS Training Center; Attendance: 0

24 February 2021 Friendly	Petaling Jaya City (Malaysia)	0–2	(Malaysia) Selangor	Petaling Jaya, Selangor
		Report	Brendan 3' (o.g.); Ifedayo 74'	Stadium: MBPJ Stadium; Attendance: 0

27 February 2021 The Derby	Kuala Lumpur United (Malaysia)	0–0 (4–2 p)	(Malaysia) Selangor	Cheras, Kuala Lumpur
		Report		Stadium: Kuala Lumpur Stadium; Attendance: 0 Referee: Noor Azriel Baharuddin
	Penalties
	Josué (penalty scored); Dominique (penalty scored); Hadin (penalty scored); Indra (penalty scored)		Safuwan (penalty scored); Ifedayo (penalty scored); Konrad (penalty missed); Buff (penalty missed)

17 July 2021 Mid-season	Melaka United (Malaysia)	3–2	(Malaysia) Selangor	Malacca
	Sony 9'; Giovane 16' 25'	Report	Ifedayo 63' (pen.); Nik Sharif 87' (pen.)	Stadium: Hang Jebat Stadium; Attendance: 0

== Competitions ==
=== Overall record ===
Competition	First match	Last match	Starting round	Final position	Record							
Competition	First match	Last match	Starting round	Final position	Pld	W	D	L	GF	GA	GD	Win %
Super League	6 March 2021	12 September 2021	Matchday 1	5th	22	10	6	6	45	30	+15	45.45
FA Cup	N/A		Cancelled	Cancelled	0	0	0	0	0	0	+0	—
Malaysia Cup	26 September 2021	18 November 2021	Group Stage	Quarter-finals	8	4	0	4	12	11	+1	50.00
Total					30	14	6	10	57	41	+16	46.67

Source: Soccerway

=== Super League ===
==== Table ====
Pos	Team	Pld	W	D	L	GF	GA	GD	Pts	Qualification or relegation
3	Penang	22	12	5	5	37	30	+7	41	
4	Terengganu	22	11	5	6	33	20	+13	38	
5	Selangor	22	10	6	6	45	30	+15	36	
6	Kuala Lumpur City	22	8	9	5	27	20	+7	33 (Note: KL City qualified to 2022 AFC Cup as winner of 2021 Malaysia Cup)	Qualification for AFC Cup group stage
7	Petaling Jaya City	22	6	6	10	16	28	−12	24	

Source: Malaysian Football League
Rules for classification: 1) Points; 2) Goal difference; 3) Number of goals scored.

==== Results summary ====
Overall								Home						Away					
Pld	W	D	L	GF	GA	GD	Pts	W	D	L	GF	GA	GD	W	D	L	GF	GA	GD
22	10	6	6	45	30	+15	36	3	3	5	16	17	−1	7	3	1	29	13	+16

Source: Super League fixtures and results

==== Results by matches ====
Win Draw Loss

Round	1	2	3	4	5	6	7	8	9	10	11	12	13	14	15	16	17	18	19	20	21	22
Ground	H	A	H	A	H	A	H	H	A	H	A	A	H	A	H	A	H	A	A	H	A	H
Result	W	L	D	D	L	W	L	W	W	D	W	D	L	D	L	W	W	W	W	D	W	L
Position	1	4	4	5	7	7	7	6	5	5	5	5	5	5	5	5	5	5	5	5	5	5

Source: Super League fixtures and results
A = Away; H = Home; W = Win; D = Draw; L = Loss

==== Matches ====
The league fixtures were announced on 20 February 2021.

Win Draw Loss

6 March 2021 1	Selangor	3–1	Sri Pahang	Petaling Jaya, Selangor
21:00 UTC+08:00	Syahmi (yellow card) 44'; Buff 45+2', 90+3'; Shahrel 55'; Ajmal (yellow card) 79'; Zack (yellow card) 89'	Report	Wagué (yellow card) 46'; Azam 69'	Stadium: MBPJ Stadium; Attendance: 0 (Note: The match was played behind closed doors due to the COVID-19 pandemic in Malaysia.); Referee: Fusser Mad Sallih

9 March 2021 2	Terengganu	3–1	Selangor	Kuala Nerus, Terengganu
21:00 UTC+08:00	Jordan 35'; Rahmat 61'; Hakimi 90+4'	Report	Shahrul 74' (o.g.)	Stadium: Sultan Mizan Zainal Abidin Stadium; Attendance: 0 Referee: Amirul Izwan Yaacob

13 March 2021 3	Selangor	1–1	Kuala Lumpur City	Petaling Jaya, Selangor
21:00 UTC+08:00	Brendan (yellow card) 72'; Gallifuoco 90' (o.g.)	Report	Indra (yellow card) 17'; Nik Shahrul (yellow card) 25'; Akram (yellow card) 36'; Dominique 80'	Stadium: MBPJ Stadium; Attendance: 0 Referee: Nazmi Nasaruddin

17 March 2021 4	Johor Darul Ta'zim	1–1	Selangor	Iskandar Puteri, Johor
21:00 UTC+08:00	Bergson 12'	Report	Ifedayo 7'; Buff (yellow card) 44'; Heubach (yellow card) 57'; Zikri (yellow card) 78'	Stadium: Sultan Ibrahim Stadium; Attendance: 0 Referee: Hamdan Awang

20 March 2021 5	Selangor	0–2	Penang	Petaling Jaya, Selangor
21:00 UTC+08:00	Safuwan (yellow card) 31'; Buff (yellow card) 37'	Report	Casagrande (yellow card) 27'; Al-Hafiz 38'; Ashraf 72'	Stadium: MBPJ Stadium; Attendance: 0 Referee: Nafeez Abd Wahab

3 April 2021 6	UiTM	0–2	Selangor	Shah Alam, Selangor
21:00 UTC+08:00	Ariff (yellow card) 61'	Report	Buff 13'; Ifedayo 40'; Ayimbila (yellow card) 45'; Syahmi (yellow card) 72'; Dinesh (yellow card) 83'	Stadium: UiTM Stadium; Attendance: 0 Referee: Fitri Maskon

6 April 2021 7	Selangor	1–2	Kedah Darul Aman	Petaling Jaya, Selangor
21:00 UTC+08:00	Safuwan (yellow card) 21'; Buff 33'; Heubach (yellow card) 41'; Khairulazhan (yellow card) 78'	Report	Ataya (yellow card) 45'; Sherman 79' (pen.); Tchétché 85'	Stadium: MBPJ Stadium; Attendance: 1,300; Referee: Fusser Mad Sallih

10 April 2021 8	Selangor	3–1	Perak	Petaling Jaya, Selangor
21:00 UTC+08:00	Ifedayo 8', 31' (pen.), 71' (yellow card) 43'	Report	Agüero (yellow card) 40'; Leandro (yellow card) 48'; Izuddin (yellow card) 75'; Farid 90+2'	Stadium: MBPJ Stadium; Attendance: 1,360; Referee: Zamzaidi Katimin

18 April 2021 9	Melaka United	2–3	Selangor	Krubong, Malacca
22:00 UTC+08:00	Faris (yellow card) 16'; Nikolić 45+3' (pen.) (yellow card) 68'; Syamim 59'; Fakhrullah (yellow card) 87'	Report	Ifedayo 51', 70'; Konrad (yellow card) 62'; Syahmi 88'	Stadium: Hang Jebat Stadium; Attendance: 837; Referee: Hamdan Awang

23 April 2021 10	Selangor	2–2	Sabah	Petaling Jaya, Selangor
22:00 UTC+08:00	Namathevan (yellow card) 45+2'; Ifedayo 57', 72'; Sharul (yellow card) 65'	Report	Amri 31'; Randy (yellow card) 50'; Jenius (yellow card) 85'; Bobby 88'	Stadium: MBPJ Stadium; Attendance: 1,697; Referee: Suhaizi Shukri

2 May 2021 11	Petaling Jaya City	1–2	Selangor	Petaling Jaya, Selangor
22:00 UTC+08:00	Ruventhiran 25'; Kannan (yellow card) 51'; Mahali (yellow card) 77'; Gurusamy (yellow card) 85'	Report	Ifedayo 89', 90+4'	Stadium: MBPJ Stadium; Attendance: 920; Referee: Noor Azriel Baharudin

5 May 2021 12	Sri Pahang	2–2	Selangor	Kuantan, Pahang
22:00 UTC+08:00	Hidalgo 48' (yellow card) 70'; Baqiuddin (yellow card) 54'; Muslim (yellow card) 65'; Ashar (yellow card) 67'; Malik 90+6'	Report	Ayimbila (yellow card) 43'; Ifedayo (yellow card) 65' (goal) 87'; Htet Aung 76'; Sharul (yellow card) 81' (yellow-red card) 90+5'	Stadium: Darul Makmur Stadium; Attendance: 0 Referee: Suhaimi Mat Hassan

9 May 2021 13	Selangor	1–2	Terengganu	Petaling Jaya, Selangor
22:00 UTC+08:00	Sarkunan (yellow card) 12'; Ifedayo 50' (pen.)	Report	Hafizal (yellow card) 43'; Engku Shakir 73' de Murga 87'	Stadium: MBPJ Stadium; Attendance: 0 Referee: Fitri Maskon

24 July 2021 14	Kuala Lumpur City	1–1	Selangor	Bandar Tun Razak, Kuala Lumpur
21:00 UTC+08:00	Josué 40'	Report	Buff 43'; Sean (yellow card) 85'	Stadium: Kuala Lumpur Stadium; Attendance: 0 Referee: Fitri Maskon

28 July 2021 15	Selangor	1–3	Johor Darul Ta'zim	Petaling Jaya, Selangor
21:00 UTC+08:00	Buff (yellow card) 31'; Ifedayo 62'; Ayimbila (yellow card) 82'	Report	Bergson 45+1'; Davies 79'; Safiq (yellow card) 84'; Sumareh 90+3'	Stadium: MBPJ Stadium; Attendance: 0 Referee: Nazmi Nasaruddin

31 July 2021 16	Penang	1–4	Selangor	George Town, Penang
21:00 UTC+08:00	Rowley 40'	Report	Ifedayo 16' (pen.), 90+5'; Sharul (yellow card) 42'; Danial 49'; Sean 57'	Stadium: City Stadium, Penang; Attendance: 0 Referee: Zulkarnain Zakaria

3 August 2021 17	Selangor	2–0	UiTM	Petaling Jaya, Selangor
21:00 UTC+08:00	Sharul 24'; Ifedayo 57'; Buff (yellow card) 80'	Report	Khuzaimi (yellow card) 39'; Fané (yellow card) 53'	Stadium: MBPJ Stadium; Attendance: 0 Referee: Zamzaidi Katimin

13 August 2021 18	Kedah Darul Aman	2–4	Selangor	Alor Setar, Kedah
21:00 UTC+08:00	Sherman 24'; Renan Alves (red card) 27'; Kumar 44'; Aiman (yellow card) 90+1'	Report	Ifedayo 28' (pen.), 74', 90+2'; Danial 30'; Syahmi (yellow card) 80'	Stadium: Darul Aman Stadium; Attendance: 0 Referee: Nazmi Nasaruddin
Note: Selangor were scheduled to play an away game against Kedah Darul Aman on 8 August 2021, but the match was postponed due to a number of suspected positive COVID-19 tests within the KDA team.

21 August 2021 19	Perak	0–3	Selangor	Ipoh, Perak
21:00 UTC+08:00	Danish (yellow card) 58'; Noureddine (yellow card) 58'	Report	Dinesh (yellow card) 6'; Buff 42'; Ifedayo 45+2', 60' (pen.); Sharul (yellow card) 50'	Stadium: Perak Stadium; Attendance: 0 Referee: Ahmad Zuhadi Dzulkifli

28 August 2021 20	Selangor	1–1	Melaka United	Petaling Jaya, Selangor
21:00 UTC+08:00	Htet Aung 18'; Ashmawi (red card) 28'	Report	Akmal (yellow card) 45+1'; Fakhrullah (yellow card) 82'; Ott 90+4'	Stadium: MBPJ Stadium; Attendance: 0 Referee: Amirul Izwan Yaacob

5 September 2021 21	Sabah	0–6	Selangor	Kota Kinabalu, Sabah
20:15 UTC+08:00	Mitrevski (yellow card) 90+2'	Report	Ifedayo 22', 24', 89'; Sarkunan (yellow card) 45'; Mukhairi 45+1'; Hakim 46'; Danial 75'	Stadium: Likas Stadium; Attendance: 0 Referee: Zulkarnain Zakaria

12 September 2021 22	Selangor	1–2	Petaling Jaya City	Petaling Jaya, Selangor
21:00 UTC+08:00	Ashmawi (yellow card) 35'; Ifedayo 45+5' (pen.); Syahmi (red card) 86'	Report	Khyril 21'; Prabakaran (yellow card) 44'; Raffi (yellow card) 45+3'; Syahmi Zamri 62'	Stadium: MBPJ Stadium; Attendance: 0 Referee: Usaid Jamal

==== Results overview ====
Win Draw Loss

Team	Home score	Away score	Double
Johor Darul Ta'zim	1–3	1–1	2–4
Kedah Darul Aman	1–2	4–2	5–4
Kuala Lumpur City	1–1	1–1	2–2
Melaka United	1–1	3–2	4–3
Penang	0–2	4–1	4–3
Perak	3–1	3–0	6–1
Petaling Jaya City	1–2	2–1	3–3
Sabah	2–2	6–0	8–2
Sri Pahang	3–1	2–2	5–3
Terengganu	1–2	1–3	2–5
UiTM	2–0	2–0	4–0

=== FA Cup ===
Due to COVID-19 pandemic in Malaysia, the tournament was cancelled immediately by Malaysia Football League (MFL).

2 March 2021 Second round	Selangor	Cancelled	TBD	TBD
21:00 UTC+08:00				Stadium: TBD
Note: The match has been cancelled due to concerns over the coronavirus pandemic.

=== Malaysia Cup ===
Selangor joined the competition in the group stage.

==== Group stage ====
Pos	Team	Pld	W	D	L	GF	GA	GD	Pts	Qualification	TER	SEL	KUC	PRK
1	Terengganu	6	5	1	0	16	4	+12	16	Quarter-finals	—	2–1	2–0	4–0
2	Selangor	6	4	0	2	12	8	+4	12	Quarter-finals	1–3	—	5–1	1–0
3	Kuching City	6	1	2	3	6	12	−6	5		1–1	1–2	—	2–2
4	Perak	6	0	1	5	4	14	−10	1		1–4	1–2	0–1	—

Source: MFL, FAM

26 September 2021 1	Selangor	1–0	Perak	Petaling Jaya, Selangor
21:00 UTC+8	Ayimbila (yellow card) 45'; Ifedayo 80' (pen.); Khairulazhan (yellow card) 90+3'; Haiqal (yellow card) 90+4'	Report	Izzuddin (yellow card) 35'; Zulkiffli (yellow card) 90+4'	Stadium: MBPJ Stadium; Attendance: 0 Referee: Noor Azriel Baharuddin

29 September 2021 2	Terengganu	2–1	Selangor	Kuala Nerus, Terengganu
21:00 UTC+8	Marcel 23'; Tuck 52'; Faisal (yellow card) 56'; Hakimi (yellow card) 68'; Shahrul (yellow card) 70'	Report	Safuwan (yellow card) 23'; Dinesh (yellow card) 69'; Ashmawi 75'	Stadium: Sultan Mizan Zainal Abidin Stadium; Attendance: 0 Referee: Nazmi Nasaruddin

30 October 2021 3	Selangor	5–1	Kuching City	Petaling Jaya, Selangor
21:00 UTC+8	Htet Aung 1'; Danial 59', 80'; Safuwan 66' (pen.); Shahrel 90+4'	Report	Ijezie 11' (pen.); Dzulazlan (yellow card) 53'; Mazwandi (yellow card) 64'	Stadium: MBPJ Stadium; Attendance: 1,400; Referee: Khirulazuan Kidam

3 November 2021 4	Kuching City	1–2	Selangor	Larkin, Johor Bahru, Johor
21:00 UTC+8	Ijezie (yellow card) 64' (goal) 67'; Zainuddin (yellow card) 90+6'	Report	Danial 18'; Safuwan (yellow card) 66'; Sharif 90+3'	Stadium: Larkin Stadium; Attendance: 0 Referee: Fitri Maskon

7 November 2021 5	Selangor	1–3	Terengganu	Petaling Jaya, Selangor
21:00 UTC+8	Sarkunan (yellow card) 71'; Shahrel 83'	Report	Faisal 15'; Mintah 72', 89'	Stadium: MBPJ Stadium; Attendance: 2,496; Referee: Nafeez Abd Wahab

10 November 2021 6	Perak	1–2	Selangor	Ipoh, Perak
21:00 UTC+8	Royizzat 10'; Noureddine (yellow card) 25'; Syafiq (yellow card) 39'	Report	Sean 73'; Shivan (yellow card) 80'; Wan Zack 85'	Stadium: Perak Stadium; Attendance: 1,388; Referee: Ahmad Zuhadi Dzulkifli

==== Quarter-finals ====
14 November 2021 First leg	Selangor	0–2	Kuala Lumpur City	Petaling Jaya, Selangor
21:00 UTC+8	Syahmi (yellow card) 46'	Report	Morales 14'; Akram (yellow card) 23'; Josué (yellow card) 29'; Hadin 82'	Stadium: MBPJ Stadium; Attendance: 3,146; Referee: Nafeez Abd Wahab

18 November 2021 Second leg	Kuala Lumpur City	1–0 (3–0 agg.)	Selangor	Cheras, Kuala Lumpur
21:00 UTC+8	Morales 50'	Report		Stadium: Kuala Lumpur Stadium; Attendance: 4,115; Referee: Nazmi Nasaruddin

== Statistics ==
=== Squad statistics ===
As of 18 November 2021

Appearances (Apps.) numbers are for appearances in competitive games only including sub appearances.
\ Red card numbers denote: Numbers in parentheses represent red cards overturned for wrongful dismissal.

No.	Nat.	Player	Pos.	Super League				FA Cup				Malaysia Cup				Total			
No.	Nat.	Player	Pos.	Apps	Goal	Yellow card	Red card	Apps	Goal	Yellow card	Red card	Apps	Goal	Yellow card	Red card	Apps	Goal	Yellow card	Red card
1	(Malaysia)	Khairulazhan	GK	21		1						7		1		28		2	
4	(Malaysia)	Ashmawi Yakin	DF	12		1	1					6	1			18	1	1	1
5	(Germany)	Manuel Konrad	MF	13		1						1				14		1	
6	(Malaysia)	K. Sarkunan	MF	7		2						3		1		10		3	
7	(Malaysia)	Sean Selvaraj	MF	12	1	1						5	1			17	2	1	
8	(Malaysia)	Nik Sharif	MF	4								4	1			8	1		
10	(Malaysia)	Shahrel Fikri	FW	12	1							6	2			18	3		
11	(Malaysia)	Wan Zack Haikal	FW	8		1						5	1			13	1	1	
12	(Bahrain)	Ifedayo Olusegun	FW	22	26	2						3	1			25	27	2	
13	(Malaysia)	R. Dinesh	DF	11		2						1		1		12		3	
14	(Malaysia)	Zikri Khalili	DF	6		1										6		1	
18	(Malaysia)	Halim Saari	MF	2												2			
19	(Malaysia)	Hakim Hassan	MF	18	1							7				25	1		
20	(Malaysia)	Syahmi Safari	DF	21	1	3	1					6		1		27	1	4	1
21	(Singapore)	Safuwan Baharudin	MF	13		2						6	1	2		19	1	4	
22	(Malaysia)	Tauffiq Ar Rasyid	GK									1				1			
23	(Switzerland)	Oliver Buff	MF	19	6	4						2				21	6	4	
25	(Malaysia)	Izhan Nazrel	GK	1												1			
26	(Malaysia)	A. Namathevan	DF	16		1						7				23		1	
27	(Malaysia)	Danial Asri	FW	21	3							7	3			28	6		
29	(Malaysia)	Mukhairi Ajmal	MF	20	1	1						3				23	1	1	
30	(Myanmar)	Hein Htet Aung	MF	12	2							7	1			19	3		
31	(Germany)	Tim Heubach	DF	7		2						1				8		2	
32	(Malaysia)	Saiful Iskandar	MF									1				1			
33	(Ghana)	Jordan Ayimbila	DF	17		3						7		1		24		4	
34	(Ghana)	Alex Agyarkwa	MF									5				5			
35	(Malaysia)	Shivan Pillay	DF	1								7		1		8		1	
37	(Ghana)	George Attram	FW									3				3			
38	(Malaysia)	Aidil Azuan	DF									1				1			
44	(Malaysia)	Sharul Nazeem	DF	14	1	4	1					5				19	1	4	1
55	(Malaysia)	Harith Haiqal	DF	2								2		1		4		1	
77	(Malaysia)	Aliff Haiqal	MF	18								6				24			
88	(Malaysia)	Brendan Gan	MF	11		1										11		1	
Own goals					2				0				0				2		
Totals					45	33	3		0	0	0		12	9	0		57	42	3

† Player left the club during the season.

=== Goalscorers ===
Includes all competitive matches.

As of match played 18 November 2021

Rank	Pos.	No.	Player	Super League	FA Cup	Malaysia Cup	Total
1	FW	12	(Bahrain) Ifedayo Olusegun	26	0	1	27
2	MF	23	(Switzerland) Oliver Buff	6	0	0	6
2	FW	27	(Malaysia) Danial Asri	3	0	3	6
4	FW	10	(Malaysia) Shahrel Fikri	1	0	2	3
4	MF	30	(Myanmar) Hein Htet Aung	2	0	1	3
6	FW	7	(Malaysia) Sean Selvaraj	1	0	1	2
7	DF	4	(Malaysia) Ashmawi Yakin	0	0	1	1
7	MF	8	(Malaysia) Nik Sharif	0	0	1	1
7	MF	11	(Malaysia) Wan Zack Haikal	0	0	1	1
7	MF	19	(Malaysia) Hakim Hassan	1	0	0	1
7	DF	20	(Malaysia) Syahmi Safari	1	0	0	1
7	MF	21	(Singapore) Safuwan Baharudin	0	0	1	1
7	MF	29	(Malaysia) Mukhairi Ajmal	1	0	0	1
7	DF	44	(Malaysia) Sharul Nazeem	1	0	0	1
Own Goals				2	0	0	2
TOTALS				45	0	12	57
Own Goals Conceded
1	TBD	TBD	TBD	0	0	0	0
TOTALS				0	0	0	0

=== Top assists ===
Rnk	Pos	No.	Player	Super League	FA Cup	Malaysia Cup	Total
1	MF	30	(Myanmar) Hein Htet Aung	5	0	1	6
2	MF	23	(Switzerland) Oliver Buff	5	0	0	5
3	FW	12	(Bahrain) Ifedayo Olusegun	4	0	0	4
3	MF	19	(Malaysia) Hakim Hassan	3	0	1	4
5	MF	88	(Malaysia) Brendan Gan	3	0	0	3
6	FW	10	(Malaysia) Shahrel Fikri	2	0	0	2
6	FW	27	(Malaysia) Danial Asri	1	0	1	2
8	FW	7	(Malaysia) Sean Selvaraj	1	0	0	1
8	DF	26	(Malaysia) A. Namathevan	1	0	0	1
8	MF	29	(Malaysia) Mukhairi Ajmal	1	0	0	1
8	DF	31	(Germany) Tim Heubach	1	0	0	1
8	DF	33	(Ghana) Jordan Ayimbila	1	0	0	1
8	MF	34	(Ghana) Alex Agyarkwa	0	0	1	1
8	MF	77	(Malaysia) Aliff Haiqal	1	0	0	1
TOTALS				29	0	4	33

=== Clean sheets ===
Rnk	No.	Player	Super League	FA Cup	Malaysia Cup	Total
1	1	(Malaysia) Khairulazhan	4	0	1	5
TOTALS			4	0	1	5

=== Disciplinary record ===
As of match played 18 November 2021

Rank	Pos.	No.	Name	Super League			FA Cup			Malaysia Cup			Total		
Rank	Pos.	No.	Name	Yellow card	(yellow card) (yellow-red card)	Red card	Yellow card	(yellow card) (yellow-red card)	Red card	Yellow card	(yellow card) (yellow-red card)	Red card	Yellow card	(yellow card) (yellow-red card)	Red card
1	DF	20	(Malaysia) Syahmi Safari	3	-	1	-	-	-	1	-	-	4	-	1
1	DF	21	(Singapore) Safuwan Baharudin	2	-	-	-	-	-	2	-	-	4	-	-
1	MF	23	(Switzerland) Oliver Buff	4	-	-	-	-	-	-	-	-	4	-	-
1	DF	33	(Ghana) Jordan Ayimbila	3	-	-	-	-	-	1	-	-	4	-	-
1	DF	44	(Malaysia) Sharul Nazeem	4	1	-	-	-	-	-	-	-	4	1	-
6	MF	6	(Malaysia) K. Sarkunan	2	-	-	-	-	-	1	-	-	3	-	-
6	DF	13	(Malaysia) R. Dinesh	2	-	-	-	-	-	1	-	-	3	-	-
8	GK	1	(Malaysia) Khairulazhan	1	-	-	-	-	-	1	-	-	2	-	-
8	FW	12	(Bahrain) Ifedayo Olusegun	2	-	-	-	-	-	-	-	-	2	-	-
8	DF	31	(Germany) Tim Heubach	2	-	-	-	-	-	-	-	-	2	-	-
11	DF	4	(Malaysia) Ashmawi Yakin	1	-	1	-	-	-	-	-	-	1	-	1
11	DF	5	(Germany) Manuel Konrad	1	-	-	-	-	-	-	-	-	1	-	-
11	MF	7	(Malaysia) Sean Selvaraj	1	-	-	-	-	-	-	-	-	1	-	-
11	MF	11	(Malaysia) Wan Zack Haikal	1	-	-	-	-	-	-	-	-	1	-	-
11	DF	14	(Malaysia) Zikri Khalili	1	-	-	-	-	-	-	-	-	1	-	-
11	DF	26	(Malaysia) A. Namathevan	1	-	-	-	-	-	-	-	-	1	-	-
11	MF	29	(Malaysia) Mukhairi Ajmal	1	-	-	-	-	-	-	-	-	1	-	-
11	DF	35	(Malaysia) Shivan Pillay	-	-	-	-	-	-	1	-	-	1	-	-
11	DF	55	(Malaysia) Harith Haiqal	-	-	-	-	-	-	1	-	-	1	-	-
11	MF	88	(Malaysia) Brendan Gan	1	-	-	-	-	-	-	-	-	1	-	-
Total				33	1	2	0	0	0	9	0	0	42	1	2
