= 2021 Selangor F.C. II season =

Selangor II
2021 season
- Chairman: Tengku Amir Shah
- Head coach: Michael Feichtenbeiner
- Stadium: MBPJ Stadium; KLFA Stadium
- Malaysia Premier League: 8th
- Top goalscorer: George Attram (9)
- Highest home attendance: 0
- Lowest home attendance: 0
- Average home league attendance: 0

Selangor F.C. II plays the 2021 season in the Malaysia Premier League.

== Review and events ==
During pre-season, five players from 2020 season have been promoted to first team.

On 19 January 2021, George Attram and Jordan Ayimbila joined the club on loan from Accra Lions.

On 19 March 2021, Selangor II won 1-0 over Kelantan United in league match.

On 25 April 2021, the club draw 2-2 against Terengganu II in a league match.

On 12 June 2021, Alex Agyarkwa joined the club on loan from Accra Lions.

On 10 August 2021, the club draw 1-1 during league match against Sarawak United.

Shivan Pillay has been appointed as club's captain.

== Competitions ==
=== Malaysia Premier League ===
==== League table ====
Pos	Team	Pld	W	D	L	GF	GA	GD	Pts	Qualification or relegation
7	Kelantan United	20	8	2	10	25	28	−3	26	Qualification for the Malaysia Cup group stage
8	PDRM	20	7	5	8	22	25	−3	26	
9	Selangor II (Note: Johor Darul Ta'zim II, Perak II, Selangor II and Terengganu II cannot be promoted from Malaysia Premier League and play in Malaysia Cup as Johor Darul Ta'zim F.C., Perak FA, Selangor F.C. and Terengganu FC (their parent clubs) remain in Malaysia Super League and play in Malaysia Cup. Should the team be relegated to Malaysia Premier League or will not play in Malaysia Cup, Johor Darul Ta'zim II, Perak II, Selangor II and Terengganu II will have to drop to Malaysia M3 League or will play in Malaysia Cup.)	20	5	9	6	27	26	+1	24	
10	Perak II (R)	20	4	5	11	14	37	−23	17	
11	FAM-MSN Project (Note: FAM-MSN Project is only as a back-up squad and will not promote to Super League.)	20	1	3	16	12	56	−44	6	

Source: MFL
Rules for classification: 1) Points; 2) Goal difference; 3) Number of goals scored.
(R) Relegated

==== Fixtures and results ====
Win Draw Loss

6 March 2021 1	PDRM	0–3	Selangor II
MYT (UTC+8)

9 March 2021 2	Selangor II	1–2	Negeri Sembilan
MYT (UTC+8)

12 March 2021 3	Selangor II	4–2	FAM-MSN Project
MYT (UTC+8)

19 March 2021 4	Selangor II	1–0	Kelantan United
MYT (UTC+8)

2 April 2021 5	Perak II	4–3	Selangor II
MYT (UTC+8)

11 April 2021 6	Johor Darul Ta'zim II	0–0	Selangor II
MYT (UTC+8)

18 April 2021 7	Selangor II	1–1	Kuching City
MYT (UTC+8)

24 April 2021 8	Terengganu II	2–2	Selangor II
MYT (UTC+8)

3 May 2021 9	Selangor II	3–1	Kelantan
MYT (UTC+8)

8 May 2021 10	Selangor II	0–1	PDRM
MYT (UTC+8)

17 July 2021 11	Selangor II	1–1	Sarawak United
MYT (UTC+8)

24 July 2021 12	Negeri Sembilan	0–0	Selangor II
MYT (UTC+8)

27 July 2021 13	FAM-MSN Project	0–1	Selangor II
MYT (UTC+8)

4 August 2021 14	Kelantan United	2–2	Selangor II
MYT (UTC+8)

7 August 2021 15	Selangor II	0–1	Perak II
MYT (UTC+8)

10 August 2021 16	Sarawak United	1–1	Selangor II
MYT (UTC+8)

20 August 2021 17	Selangor II	1–1	Johor Darul Ta'zim II
MYT (UTC+8)

28 August 2021 18	Kuching City	1–1	Selangor II
MYT (UTC+8)

10 September 2021 19	Selangor II	1–4	Terengganu II
MYT (UTC+8)

21 September 2021 20	Kelantan	2–1	Selangor II
MYT (UTC+8)

== Coaching staff ==
- Head coach: Michael Feichtenbeiner
- Assistant head coach: Rusdi Suparman
- Assistant coach: Mohamed Aslam Haja Najumudeen
- Goalkeeper coach: Shuhaimi Abdul Hamid
- Fitness coach: Mashidee Sulaiman

== Statistics ==
=== Appearances and goals ===
No.	Pos	Nat	Player	Total		League	
No.	Pos	Nat	Player	Apps	Goals	Apps	Goals
Goalkeepers
1	GK	(Malaysia) MAS	Syahmi Adib	0	0	0	0
20	GK	(Malaysia) MAS	Aqil Fadhly	3	0	3	0
35	GK	(Malaysia) MAS	Sikh Izhan Nazrel	16	0	16	0
46	GK	(Malaysia) MAS	Firdaus Irman	1	0	1	0
61	GK	(Malaysia) MAS	Abdul Alim Al-Amri	0	0	0	0
Defenders
3	DF	(Ghana) GHA	Jordan Ayimbila	4	0	4	0
5	DF	(Malaysia) MAS	Harith Haiqal	17	4	17	4
19	DF	(Malaysia) MAS	Shivan Pillay	15	0	15	0
23	DF	(Malaysia) MAS	Aidil Azuan	8	0	5+3	0
28	DF	(Malaysia) MAS	Devesshraja Sathiahmoorthy	0	0	0	0
29	DF	(Malaysia) MAS	Faiz Amer	17	0	14+3	0
33	DF	(Malaysia) MAS	Azrin Afiq	18	0	12+6	0
34	DF	(Malaysia) MAS	Zikri Khalili	8	0	8	0
38	DF	(Malaysia) MAS	Brandon Liew	0	0	0	0
55	DF	(Malaysia) MAS	Iqmal Ramlan	13	0	8+5	0
59	DF	(Malaysia) MAS	Izzul Adham	15	0	9+6	0
68	DF	(Malaysia) MAS	Syaizwan Irfan	0	0	0	0
75	DF	(Malaysia) MAS	Nik Umar	8	1	2+6	1
Midfielders
6	MF	(Malaysia) MAS	Ikhwan Hafizo	12	0	10+2	0
7	MF	(Malaysia) MAS	Sharvin Selvakumaran	12	1	3+9	1
8	MF	(Malaysia) MAS	Khairu Anwar Khazali	0	0	0	0
9	MF	(Malaysia) MAS	Fazrul Fahriz	11	1	7+4	1
10	MF	(Myanmar) MYA	Hein Htet Aung	7	2	7	2
16	MF	(Malaysia) MAS	Saiful Iskandar	20	2	19+1	2
18	MF	(Malaysia) MAS	Nik Sharif Haseefy	2	0	2	0
24	MF	(Ghana) GHA	Alex Agyarkwa	8	2	7+1	2
48	MF	(Malaysia) MAS	Azannis Adzri	6	0	3+3	0
50	MF	(Germany) GER	Manuel Konrad	3	0	3	0
56	MF	(Malaysia) MAS	Adib Hakimi	0	0	0	0
57	MF	(Malaysia) MAS	Khairul Naim	3	0	1+2	0
66	MF	(Malaysia) MAS	Haziq Zaki	1	0	0+1	0
77	MF	(Malaysia) MAS	Fahmi Daniel	8	0	3+5	0
80	MF	(Malaysia) MAS	Saravanan Thirumurugan	14	2	5+9	2
88	MF	(Malaysia) MAS	Syazwan Salihin	14	1	12+2	1
Forwards
11	FW	(Ghana) GHA	George Attram	12	9	12	9
13	FW	(Malaysia) MAS	Nazrin Nasir	7	0	0+7	0
37	FW	(Malaysia) MAS	Danial Asri	2	0	2	0
47	FW	(Malaysia) MAS	Khairi Suffian	9	0	4+5	0
79	FW	(Malaysia) MAS	Alifh Aiman	9	0	6+3	0
Players transferred out during the season

Last updated: 21 September 2021
Source: Competitions
