= 2021 Kuching City F.C. season =

Kuching City
2021 season
- Co-owner: Fazzrudin Abdul Rahman; Kamaludin Akil
- Head coach: Irfan Bakti
- Stadium: Sarawak Stadium; Pasir Gudang Municipal Council Stadium (Temporary stadium)
- Malaysia Premier League: 5th
- Malaysia Cup: Group stage
- Top goalscorer: League: Alif Hassan (5); All: Alif Hassan (6)
- Highest home attendance: 0
- Lowest home attendance: 0
- Average home league attendance: 0
Third colours

The 2021 season was Kuching City's sixth year in their history and second season in the Malaysia Premier League since 2020 following promotion 2019 season. Along with the league, the club will also compete in the Malaysia Cup.

== Events ==
On 1 December 2020, the club announced Irfan Bakti as club's head coach on one-year contract.

On 21 January 2021, the players started training with club's new head coach, Irfan Bakti.

On 24 July 2021, the league match against Terengganu II has been postponed due to COVID-19 cases among Kuching City players and officials.

On 12 January 2021, Alemão joined the club from Kelantan United. Hudson Dias, Leo and Yuta Suzuki have been retained from last season. Joseph Kalang Tie has been appointed as club's captain.

On 25 February 2021, Leo has been released from the club due to injury.

On 18 June 2021, Michael Ijezie joined the club from Langkawi City. Bryan has been released from the club upon mutual agreement.

== Players ==
=== First-team squad ===
As of 6 August 2021

Note: Flags indicate national team as defined under FIFA eligibility rules; some limited exceptions apply. Players may hold more than one non-FIFA nationality.

No.	Pos.	Nation	Player
1	GK	(Malaysia) MAS	Andy Nicholas Nipen
2	DF	(Malaysia) MAS	Jimmy Raymond
3	DF	(Malaysia) MAS	Hairol Mokhtar (vice-captain)
4	DF	(Brazil) BRA	Alemão
5	DF	(Malaysia) MAS	Sahran Abdul Samad
8	FW	(Malaysia) MAS	Joseph Kalang Tie (captain)
9	DF	(Malaysia) MAS	Adam Shreen
10	FW	(Nigeria) NGA	Michael Ijezie
11	MF	(Malaysia) MAS	Hafis Saperi
12	DF	(Malaysia) MAS	Rames Lai
13	DF	(Malaysia) MAS	Dzulazlan Ibrahim
15	DF	(Malaysia) MAS	Izray Iffarul
17	MF	(Malaysia) MAS	Rafiezan Razali
18	MF	(Malaysia) MAS	Rafiq Shah

No.	Pos.	Nation	Player
19	DF	(Malaysia) MAS	Irwan Syazmin
22	MF	(Malaysia) MAS	Zainuddin Bohri
23	GK	(Malaysia) MAS	Hafiezulhisyam Roslee
25	GK	(Malaysia) MAS	Iqbal Suhimi
27	GK	(Malaysia) MAS	Wan Azraie
28	MF	(Malaysia) MAS	Samsu Alam Samad
30	MF	(Japan) JPN	Yuta Suzuki
39	DF	(Malaysia) MAS	Nazrul Abdul Samad
44	MF	(Malaysia) MAS	Alif Hassan
51	FW	(Malaysia) MAS	Amirrul Iqmal
52	MF	(Malaysia) MAS	Amir Amri
53	MF	(Brazil) BRA	Hudson
59	FW	(Malaysia) MAS	Wan Badzreen
89	DF	(Malaysia) MAS	Mazwandi Zekeria (3rd-captain)

== Technical staff ==
Position	Name
Head coach	(Malaysia) Irfan Bakti
Assistant head coach	(Malaysia) Sulaiman Hussin
Goalkeeper coach	(Malaysia) Mohd Azley Abdullah
Fitness coach	(Malaysia) Dharmendra Mahalingam
Team doctor	(Malaysia) Nik Alif Azriq Nik Abdullah
Team doctor	(Malaysia) Abang Mohd Nurfarhan Abang Samatan
Team doctor	(Malaysia) Muhammad Karbela Reza Ramlan
Physiotherapist	(Malaysia) Ferdinand Lisa Satu

== Competitions ==
=== Malaysia Premier League ===
==== League table ====
Pos	Team	Pld	W	D	L	GF	GA	GD	Pts	Qualification or relegation
3	Terengganu II (Note: Johor Darul Ta'zim II, Perak II, Selangor II and Terengganu II cannot be promoted from Malaysia Premier League and play in Malaysia Cup as Johor Darul Ta'zim F.C., Perak FA, Selangor F.C. and Terengganu FC (their parent clubs) remain in Malaysia Super League and play in Malaysia Cup. Should the team be relegated to Malaysia Premier League or will not play in Malaysia Cup, Johor Darul Ta'zim II, Perak II, Selangor II and Terengganu II will have to drop to Malaysia M3 League or will play in Malaysia Cup.)	20	9	8	3	37	18	+19	35	
4	Johor Darul Ta'zim II	20	9	7	4	38	20	+18	34	
5	Kuching City	20	7	6	7	22	22	0	27	Qualification for the Malaysia Cup group stage
6	Kelantan	20	8	3	9	23	28	−5	27	Qualification for the Malaysia Cup group stage
7	Kelantan United	20	8	2	10	25	28	−3	26	Qualification for the Malaysia Cup group stage

Source: MFL
Rules for classification: 1) Points; 2) Goal difference; 3) Number of goals scored.

==== Matches ====
10 March 2021 1	Terengganu II	1–1	Kuching City
MYT (UTC+8)

13 March 2021 2	Johor Darul Ta'zim II	3–1	Kuching City
MYT (UTC+8)

16 March 2021 3	Sarawak United	2–0	Kuching City
MYT (UTC+8)

20 March 2021 4	PDRM	1–2	Kuching City
MYT (UTC+8)

3 April 2021 5	Negeri Sembilan	0–0	Kuching City
MYT (UTC+8)

7 April 2021 6	FAM-MSN Project	2–2	Kuching City
MYT (UTC+8)

10 April 2021 7	Kelantan	1–0	Kuching City
MYT (UTC+8)

24 April 2021 9	Kelantan United	1–0	Kuching City
MYT (UTC+8)

27 April 2021 10	Perak II	0–2	Kuching City
MYT (UTC+8)

21 August 2021 11	Kuching City	3–1	Kelantan
MYT (UTC+8)

25 August 2021 12	Kuching City	2–1	Johor Darul Ta'zim II
MYT (UTC+8)

28 August 2021 13	Kuching City	1–1	Selangor II
MYT (UTC+8)

1 September 2021 14	Kuching City	1–2	Negeri Sembilan
MYT (UTC+8)

4 September 2021 15	Kuching City	0–0	PDRM
MYT (UTC+8)

7 September 2021 16	Kuching City	1–0	Sarawak United
MYT (UTC+8)

14 September 2021 17	Kuching City	2–0	FAM-MSN Project
MYT (UTC+8)

17 September 2021 18	Kuching City	0–2	Terengganu II
MYT (UTC+8)

21 September 2021 19	Kuching City	2–0	Perak II
MYT (UTC+8)

24 September 2021 20	Kuching City	1–3	Kelantan United
MYT (UTC+8)

=== Malaysia Cup ===
==== Group stage ====
The draw for the group stage was held on 15 September 2021.

Pos	Team	Pld	W	D	L	GF	GA	GD	Pts	Qualification	TER	SEL	KUC	PRK
1	Terengganu	6	5	1	0	16	4	+12	16	Quarter-finals	—	2–1	2–0	4–0
2	Selangor	6	4	0	2	12	8	+4	12	Quarter-finals	1–3	—	5–1	1–0
3	Kuching City	6	1	2	3	6	12	−6	5		1–1	1–2	—	2–2
4	Perak	6	0	1	5	4	14	−10	1		1–4	1–2	0–1	—

Source: MFL, FAM

26 September 2021 1	Terengganu	2–0	Kuching City
UTC +8

29 September 2021 2	Kuching City	2–2	Perak
UTC +8

30 October 2021 3	Selangor	5–1	Kuching City
21:00 UTC +8

3 November 2021 4	Kuching City	1–2	Selangor
21:00 UTC +8

7 November 2021 5	Perak	0–1	Kuching City
21:00 UTC +8

10 November 2021 6	Kuching City	1–1	Terengganu
21:00 UTC +8

== Statistics ==
=== Appearances and goals ===
As of 10 November 2021

No.	Pos	Nat	Player	Total		League		Malaysia Cup	
No.	Pos	Nat	Player	Apps	Goals	Apps	Goals	Apps	Goals
2	DF	(Malaysia) MAS	Jimmy Raymond	18	0	12+4	0	1+1	0
3	DF	(Malaysia) MAS	Hairol Mokhtar	9	1	8+1	1		
4	DF	(Brazil) BRA	Alemão	25	1	18+1	1	6	0
5	DF	(Malaysia) MAS	Sahran Abdul Samad	2	0	0+2	0		
8	MF	(Malaysia) MAS	Joseph Kalang Tie	23	4	14+4	4	4+1	0
9	MF	(Malaysia) MAS	Adam Shreen	24	1	17+2	1	5	0
10	FW	(Nigeria) NGA	Michael Ijezie	14	6	9	4	5	2
11	MF	(Malaysia) MAS	Hafis Saperi	2	0	0+2	0		
12	DF	(Malaysia) MAS	Rames Lai	24	0	19	0	5	0
13	DF	(Malaysia) MAS	Dzulazlan Ibrahim	13	0	7+1	0	5	0
15	DF	(Malaysia) MAS	Izray Iffarul	4	0	1+1	0	0+2	0
17	MF	(Malaysia) MAS	Rafiezan Razali	16	0	2+9	0	3+2	0
18	MF	(Malaysia) MAS	Rafiq Shah	15	1	7+3	0	5	1
19	DF	(Malaysia) MAS	Irwan Syazmin	18	2	9+4	2	5	0
22	MF	(Malaysia) MAS	Zainudin Bohri	21	0	3+14	0	1+3	0
25	GK	(Malaysia) MAS	Iqbal Suhimi	15	0	11+2	0	2	0
26	FW	(Malaysia) MAS	Shafiq Shaharudin	6	0	2+4	0		
27	GK	(Malaysia) MAS	Wan Azraie	13	0	9	0	4	0
30	MF	(Japan) JPN	Yuta Suzuki	26	2	19+1	1	6	1
44	MF	(Malaysia) MAS	Alif Hassan	25	6	15+4	5	4+2	1
50	MF	(Malaysia) MAS	Diego Baggio Test	12	0	5+1	0	3+3	0
51	FW	(Malaysia) MAS	Amirrul Iqmal	11	0	2+7	0	0+2	0
52	MF	(Malaysia) MAS	Amir Amri	12	1	3+5	1	0+4	0
53	FW	(Brazil) BRA	Hudson	14	3	10+3	2	1	1
59	FW	(Malaysia) MAS	Wan Badzreen	3	0	0+1	0	0+2	0
89	MF	(Malaysia) MAS	Mazwandi Zekeria	13	0	10+1	0	1+1	0
Players transferred out during the season
7	FW	(Brazil) BRA	Bryan	8	0	7+1	0	0	0
