= 2021 Sarawak United FC season =

Sarawak United
2021 season
- Owner: Football Association of Sarawak
- Chairman: Posa Majais
- Head coach: E. Elavarasan
- Stadium: Sarawak Stadium
- Malaysia Premier League: 2nd (promoted) ▲
- Malaysia Cup: Quarter-finals
- Top goalscorer: League: Uche Agba (14); All: Uche Agba (19)
- Highest home attendance: 0
- Lowest home attendance: 0
- Average home league attendance: 0
Home colours	Away colours

The 2021 season was Sarawak United's second year in their history and second season in the Malaysia Premier League since last year following rebranding from Selangor United FC. Along with the league, the club will also compete in the Malaysia Cup.

== Events ==
On 17 December 2020, B. Sathianathan signed a two-year contract starting January 2021 as the club's technical director.

On 25 December 2020, several players signed a contract with the club.

== Players ==
=== First-team squad ===
As of 12 August 2021

Note: Flags indicate national team as defined under FIFA eligibility rules; some limited exceptions apply. Players may hold more than one non-FIFA nationality.

No.	Pos.	Nation	Player
1	GK	MAS	Sharbinee Allawee
2	DF	MAS	K. Reuben
4	DF	AUS	Taylor Regan (captain)
5	DF	MAS	Rahman Ismawi
6	MF	MAS	Zahril Azri
7	MF	MAS	Shamie Iszuan
8	DF	MAS	Tommy Mawat Bada
9	FW	MAS	Norshahrul Idlan
10	FW	BRA	Sandro
11	FW	MAS	Ashri Chuchu
12	DF	MAS	Khair Jones
13	DF	MAS	Badrul Affendy
15	MF	KOR	Lee Chang-hoon
16	MF	MAS	Stuart Wark

No.	Pos.	Nation	Player
17	MF	MAS	Nor Azizi Ramlee
18	MF	MAS	Mathias Mansor
19	MF	MAS	Christie Jayaseelan
20	GK	MAS	Shaiful Wazizi
21	FW	NGA	Uche Agba
22	FW	MAS	Zahrul Nizwan
23	MF	MAS	Veenod Subramaniam
24	MF	MAS	Gopi Rizqi
25	GK	MAS	Haziq Aris
26	DF	MAS	Amer Saidin
27	FW	MAS	Chanthuru Suppiah
77	FW	MAS	Rahim Razak
92	MF	MAS	Sabri Sahar (on loan from Sabah)
97	MF	MAS	Azman Chuchu

== Competitions ==
=== Malaysia Premier League ===
==== League table ====
Pos	Team	Pld	W	D	L	GF	GA	GD	Pts	Qualification or relegation
1	Negeri Sembilan (C, P)	20	12	5	3	33	16	+17	41	Promotion to Super League and Qualification for the Malaysia Cup group stage
2	Sarawak United (P)	20	11	5	4	37	14	+23	38	Promotion to Super League and Qualification for the Malaysia Cup group stage
3	Terengganu II (Note: Johor Darul Ta'zim II, Perak II, Selangor II and Terengganu II cannot be promoted from Malaysia Premier League and play in Malaysia Cup as Johor Darul Ta'zim F.C., Perak FA, Selangor F.C. and Terengganu FC (their parent clubs) remain in Malaysia Super League and play in Malaysia Cup. Should the team be relegated to Malaysia Premier League or will not play in Malaysia Cup, Johor Darul Ta'zim II, Perak II, Selangor II and Terengganu II will have to drop to Malaysia M3 League or will play in Malaysia Cup.)	20	9	8	3	37	18	+19	35	
4	Johor Darul Ta'zim II	20	9	7	4	38	20	+18	34	
5	Kuching City	20	7	6	7	22	22	0	27	Qualification for the Malaysia Cup group stage

Source: MFL
Rules for classification: 1) Points; 2) Goal difference; 3) Number of goals scored.
(C) Champions; (P) Promoted

==== Results by round ====
Round	1	2	3	4	5	6	7	8	9	10	11	12	13	14	15	16	17	18	19	20
Ground	H	A	H	H	A	H	H	A	H	A	A	A	H	H	H	A	A	A	H	A
Result	W	W	W	D	W	W	L	D	W	W	D	L	W	D	W	W	W	L	L	D
Position	3	1	2	2	2	2	3	1	2	2	2	1	3	3	3	1	1	1	2	2

Updated to match(es) played on 21 September 2021. Source: Malaysia Premier League
A = Away; H = Home; W = Win; D = Draw; L = Loss

==== Matches ====
7 March 2021 1	Sarawak United	2–0	Kelantan United
MYT (UTC+8)

10 March 2021 2	Perak II	0–3	Sarawak United
MYT (UTC+8)

16 March 2021 3	Sarawak United	2–0	Kuching City
MYT (UTC+8)

21 March 2021 4	Sarawak United	0–0	Terengganu II
MYT (UTC+8)

3 April 2021 5	Kelantan	0–1	Sarawak United
MYT (UTC+8)

10 April 2021 6	Sarawak United	7–1	FAM-MSN Project
MYT (UTC+8)

16 April 2021 7	Sarawak United	0–2	PDRM
MYT (UTC+8)

24 April 2021 8	Negeri Sembilan	1–1	Sarawak United
MYT (UTC+8)

1 May 2021 9	Sarawak United	1–0	Johor Darul Ta'zim II
MYT (UTC+8)

7 May 2021 10	Kelantan United	2–3	Sarawak United
MYT (UTC+8)

17 July 2021 11	Selangor II	1–1	Sarawak United
MYT (UTC+8)

3 August 2021 12	Terengganu II	1–0	Sarawak United
MYT (UTC+8)

7 August 2021 13	Sarawak United	3–1	Kelantan United
MYT (UTC+8)

10 August 2021 14	Selangor II	1–1	Sarawak United
MYT (UTC+8)

15 August 2021 15	Sarawak United	4–1	Perak II
MYT (UTC+8)

22 August 2021 16	FAM-MSN Project	0–4	Sarawak United
MYT (UTC+8)

27 August 2021 17	PDRM	0–3	Sarawak United
MYT (UTC+8)

7 September 2021 18	Kuching City	1–0	Sarawak United
MYT (UTC+8)

10 September 2021 19	Sarawak United	0–1	Negeri Sembilan
MYT (UTC+8)

21 September 2021 20	Johor Darul Ta'zim II	1–1	Sarawak United
MYT (UTC+8)

=== Malaysia Cup ===
==== Group stage ====
The draw for the group stage was held on 15 September 2021.

Pos	Team	Pld	W	D	L	GF	GA	GD	Pts	Qualification	KUL	SUD	PAH	PEN
1	Kuala Lumpur City	6	4	2	0	12	4	+8	14	Quarter-finals	—	4–0	3–1	1–0
2	Sarawak United	6	3	1	2	9	10	−1	10	Quarter-finals	2–2	—	1–0	1–2
3	Sri Pahang	6	2	0	4	11	7	+4	6		0–1	1–2	—	4–0
4	Penang	6	1	1	4	4	15	−11	4		1–1	1–3	0–5	—

Source: MFL, FAM

26 September 2021 1	Penang	1–3	Sarawak United
MYT (UTC+8)	Al-Hafiz Harun 56'		Uche Agba 47', 58'; Khair Jones 54'

29 September 2021 2	Sarawak United	1–0	Sri Pahang
MYT (UTC+8)	Tommy Mawat Bada 61'

30 October 2021 3	Kuala Lumpur City	4–0	Sarawak United
MYT (UTC+8)

3 November 2021 4	Sarawak United	2–2	Kuala Lumpur City
MYT (UTC+8)

7 November 2021 5	Sri Pahang	1–2	Sarawak United
MYT (UTC+8)

10 November 2021 6	Sarawak United	1–2	Penang
MYT (UTC+8)

==== Knockout stage ====
===== Quarter-finals =====
14 November 2021 First leg	Terengganu	2–1	Sarawak United
MYT (UTC+8)

18 November 2021 Second leg	Sarawak United	2–4 (3–6 agg.)	Terengganu
MYT (UTC+8)

== Statistics ==
=== Appearances and goals ===
As of 18 November 2021

No.	Pos	Nat	Player	Total		League		Malaysia Cup	
No.	Pos	Nat	Player	Apps	Goals	Apps	Goals	Apps	Goals
1	GK	(Malaysia) MAS	Sharbinee Allawee	23	0	19	0	4	0
2	DF	(Malaysia) MAS	K. Reuben	3	0	3	0	0	0
4	DF	(Australia) AUS	Taylor Regan	21	3	19	3	2	0
6	MF	(Malaysia) MAS	Zahril Azri	24	0	16+1	0	7	0
7	MF	(Malaysia) MAS	Shamie Iszuan	27	1	8+11	1	5+3	0
8	MF	(Malaysia) MAS	Tommy Mawat	22	2	13+2	1	7	1
9	FW	(Malaysia) MAS	Norshahrul Idlan	16	4	13+2	4	1	0
10	MF	(Brazil) BRA	Sandro	24	5	11+5	3	7+1	2
11	MF	(Malaysia) MAS	Ashri Chuchu	11	0	2+2	0	4+3	0
12	DF	(Malaysia) MAS	Khair Jones	15	1	7	0	8	1
13	DF	(Malaysia) MAS	Badrul Affendy	14	0	11	0	1+2	0
15	DF	(South Korea) KOR	Lee Chang-hoon	19	1	16+1	1	0+2	0
16	MF	(Malaysia) MAS	Stuart Wark	19	1	10+1	1	8	0
17	MF	(Malaysia) MAS	Azizi Ramlee	12	0	1+6	0	2+3	0
19	MF	(Malaysia) MAS	Christie Jayaseelan	22	3	13+3	2	2+4	1
20	GK	(Malaysia) MAS	Shaiful Wazizi	6	0	1+1	0	4	0
21	FW	(Nigeria) NGA	Uche Agba	26	19	18	14	8	5
22	FW	(Malaysia) MAS	Zahrul Nizwan	1	0	0+1	0	0	0
23	MF	(Malaysia) MAS	Veenod Subramaniam	21	0	7+6	0	4+4	0
24	MF	(Malaysia) MAS	Gopi Rizqi	23	2	6+13	2	1+3	0
26	DF	(Malaysia) MAS	Amer Saidin	16	0	9+2	0	5	0
27	MF	(Malaysia) MAS	Chanturu Suppiah	23	1	13+2	1	7+1	0
77	MF	(Malaysia) MAS	Rahim Razak	25	5	4+15	4	0+6	1
92	MF	(Malaysia) MAS	Sabri Sahar	4	0	0+3	0	1	0
97	MF	(Malaysia) MAS	Azman Chuchu	1	0	0+1	0	0	0

=== Clean sheets ===
As of match played 29 September 2021

Rank	No.	Pos.	Player	League	Malaysia Cup	Total
1	1	GK	(Malaysia) Sharbinee Allawee	8	0	8
2	20	GK	(Malaysia) Shaiful Wazizi	0	1	1
Totals				8	1	9
