= 2021 Malaysia Cup final =

- Event: 2021 Malaysia Cup
Kuala Lumpur City	Johor Darul Ta'zim
2	0
- Date: 30 November 2021
- Venue: Bukit Jalil National Stadium, Kuala Lumpur
- Man of the Match: Zhafri Yahya (Kuala Lumpur City)
- Referee: Razlan Joffri Ali
- Attendance: 19,852
- Weather: Good; 29 °C (84 °F)

The 2021 Malaysia Cup final was a football match played on 30 November 2021, and determined the champion of the 2021 Malaysia Cup. It was the final of the 95th edition of the Malaysia Cup, a competition organised by the Football Association of Malaysia.

It was played at the Bukit Jalil National Stadium in Kuala Lumpur between Kuala Lumpur City and Johor Darul Ta'zim.

Kuala Lumpur City won the match 2–0 and clinched their fourth title. They have also qualified for the 2022 AFC Cup.

== Format ==
The final was played as a single match. If the game would be tied at the end of regulation time, extra time and, if necessary, a penalty shoot-out would be used to decide the winning team.

== Road to the final ==
Note: In all results below, the score of the finalist is given first. (H: home; A: away)

Kuala Lumpur City				Round	Johor Darul Ta'zim			
Opponent	Result			Group stage	Opponent	Result		
Sri Pahang	3–1 (H)			Matchday 1	Kelantan	2–0 (H)		
Penang	1–1 (A)			Matchday 2	Petaling Jaya City	1–0 (H)		
Sarawak United	4–0 (H)			Matchday 3	Sabah	2–0 (A)		
Sarawak United	2–2 (A)			Matchday 4	Sabah	3–0 (H)		
Penang	1–0 (H)			Matchday 5	Petaling Jaya City	2–1 (A)		
Sri Pahang	1–0 (A)			Matchday 6	Kelantan	4–0 (A)		
Group A winners: Pos / Team / Pld / Pts; 1 / Kuala Lumpur City / 6 / 14; 2 / Sarawak United / 6 / 10; 3 / Sri Pahang / 6 / 6; 4 / Penang / 6 / 4; Source: MFL, FAM				Final standings	Group D winners: Pos / Team / Pld / Pts; 1 / Johor Darul Ta'zim / 6 / 18; 2 / Sabah / 6 / 8; 3 / Petaling Jaya City / 6 / 5; 4 / Kelantan / 6 / 2; Source: MFL, FAM			
Opponent	Agg.	1st leg	2nd leg	Knockout stage	Opponent	Agg.	1st leg	2nd leg
Selangor	3–0	2–0 (A)	1–0 (H)	Quarter-finals	Kedah Darul Aman	1–0	0–0 (A)	1–0 (H)
Melaka United	2–2 (5–3 p)	1–1 (H)	1–1 (a.e.t.) (A)	Semi-finals	Terengganu	4–1	1–1 (A)	3–0 (H)

== Match ==
=== Details ===
30 November 2021
21:00 UTC+8

Kuala Lumpur City	2−0	Johor Darul Ta'zim
Zhafri 66'; Josué 74'	Report

Bukit Jalil National Stadium, Kuala Lumpur
Attendance: 19,852
Referee: Razlan Joffri Ali

Kuala Lumpur City	Johor Darul Ta'zim

GK	1	(Philippines) Kevin Ray Mendoza
RB	4	(Malaysia) Kamal Azizi
CB	9	(Australia) Giancarlo Gallifuoco
CB	21	(Malaysia) Kenny Pallraj		(substituted off) 90+3'
LB	3	(Malaysia) Daniel Ting
RM	8	(Malaysia) Zhafri Yahya		(substituted off) 86'
CM	6	(Malaysia) Ryan Lambert
CM	14	(Malaysia) Akram Mahinan	(yellow card) 61'
LM	19	(Malaysia) J. Partiban		(substituted off) 72'
CF	7	(Colombia) Romel Morales
CF	28	(Brazil) Paulo Josué (c)
Substitutes:
GK	22	(Malaysia) Khatul Anuar
DF	2	(Malaysia) Wan Amirzafran
DF	25	(Malaysia) Anwar Ibrahim
MF	12	(Malaysia) Shukor Adan		(substituted in) 90+3'
MF	27	(Malaysia) Hadin Azman	(yellow card) 83'	(substituted in) 72'
MF	29	(Malaysia) Arif Shaqirin		(substituted in) 86'
MF	30	(Malaysia) Fakrul Aiman
FW	23	(Malaysia) Indra Putra
FW	10	(Malaysia) Safee Sali
Manager:
(Croatia) Bojan Hodak

GK	1	(Malaysia) Farizal Marlias (c)
RB	2	(Malaysia) Matthew Davies
CB	14	(Australia) Shane Lowry
CB	33	(Brazil) Maurício
LB	12	(Malaysia) S. Kunanlan		(substituted off) 63'
DM	4	(Malaysia) Afiq Fazail		(substituted off) 77'
CM	10	(Argentina) Leandro Velázquez
CM	30	(Malaysia) Natxo Insa	(yellow card) 90'
LW	29	(Malaysia) Safawi Rasid		(substituted off) 67'
CF	9	(Brazil) Bergson
RW	42	(Malaysia) Arif Aiman		(substituted off) 77'
Substitutions:
GK	26	(Malaysia) Haziq Nadzli
DF	7	(Malaysia) Aidil Zafuan
DF	22	(Malaysia) Corbin-Ong		(substituted in) 63'
DF	32	(Malaysia) Shahrul Saad
MF	13	(Malaysia) Mohamadou Sumareh		(substituted in) 77'
MF	16	(Malaysia) Danial Amier
MF	21	(Malaysia) Nazmi Faiz		(substituted in) 67'
FW	18	(Malaysia) Hazwan Bakri
FW	28	(Malaysia) Syafiq Ahmad		(substituted in) 77'
Manager:
(Mexico) Benjamin Mora

Officials

- Assistant referees:
  - Yusri Mohammad
  - Mu'azi Zainal Abidin
- Fourth official:
  - Azman Ismail
- Additional assistant referees:
  - Suhaizi Shukri
  - Ku Alauddin Ku Muhammad

Match Rules

- 90 minutes.
- 30 minutes of extra time if necessary.
- Penalty shoot-out if scores still level.
- Nine named substitutes.

=== Statistics ===
Overall
Statistic	Kuala Lumpur City	Johor Darul Ta'zim
Goals scored	2	0
Total shots	3	13
Shots on target	2	3
Ball possession	45%	55%
Corner kicks	1	6
Offsides	1	2
Yellow cards	2	1
Red cards	0	0
