= 2021 Malaysia Cup group stage =

Malaysian football tournament

The 2021 Malaysia Cup group stage began on 25 September and ended on 10 November 2021. A total of 16 teams competed in the group stage to decide the 8 places in the knockout stage of the 2021 Malaysia Cup.

== Draw ==
The draw for the group stage was held on 15 September 2021, 14:00 MYT (UTC+8), at the Bukit Jalil, in Kuala Lumpur.

The 16 teams were drawn into four groups of four. For the draw, the teams were seeded into four pots based on the following principles.

- Pot 1 contained the Super League winners, and another three teams at the top four based on league positions. Pot 1 includes the top 4 teams from the Super League.
- Pot 2 with those place 5th to 8th from the Super League.
- Pot 3 with those placed 9th to 11th from Super League, together with the 1st placed team from the Premier League.
- Pot 4 with those placed 2th to 5th from Premier League.

The schedule of each matchday is as follows:

Group stage schedule
| Matchday | Dates |
|---|---|
| 1 | 26–27 September 2021 |
| 2 | 29 September– 1 October 2021 |
| 3 | 29–30 October 2021 |
| 4 | 1–3 November 2021 |
| 5 | 6–7 November 2021 |
| 6 | 9–10 November 2021 |

== Teams ==
Below are the participating teams grouped by their seeding pot. They include:

- Top 11 teams from the Super League and Top 5 teams from Premier League which enter in this stage.

| Pot 1 (Super League) | Pot 2 (Super League) | Pot 3 (Super League and Premier League) | Pot 4 (Premier League) |
|---|---|---|---|
| Johor Darul Ta'zim; Kedah Darul Aman; Penang; Terengganu | Selangor; Kuala Lumpur City; Petaling Jaya; Melaka United | Sabah; Sri Pahang; Perak; Negeri Sembilan | Sarawak United; Kuching City; Kelantan; Kelantan United |

== Format ==
In each group, teams played against each other home-and-away in a round-robin format. The group winners and runners-up advanced to the quarter-finals.

=== Tiebreakers ===
Teams were ranked according to points (3 points for a win, 1 point for a draw, 0 points for a loss), and if tied on points, the following tiebreaking criteria were applied, in the order given, to determine the rankings.

1. Points in head-to-head matches among tied teams;
2. Goal difference in head-to-head matches among tied teams;
3. Goals scored in head-to-head matches among tied teams;
4. Away goals scored in head-to-head matches among tied teams;
5. If more than two teams were tied, and after applying all head-to-head criteria above, a subset of teams were still tied, all head-to-head criteria above was reapplied exclusively to this subset of teams;
6. Goal difference in all group matches;
7. Goals scored in all group matches;
8. Away goals scored in all group matches;
9. Wins in all group matches;
10. Away wins in all group matches;
11. Disciplinary points (red card = 3 points, yellow card = 1 point, expulsion for two yellow cards in one match = 3 points);

== Groups ==
The matchdays were 26–27 September, 29 September– 1 October, 29–30 October, 1–3 November, 6–7 November, and 9–10 November 2021. All times are on Malaysia Standard Time (UTC+8).

=== Group A ===
| Pos | Team | Pld | W | D | L | GF | GA | GD | Pts | Qualification | KUL | SUD | PAH | PEN |
|---|---|---|---|---|---|---|---|---|---|---|---|---|---|---|
| 1 | Kuala Lumpur City | 6 | 4 | 2 | 0 | 12 | 4 | +8 | 14 | Quarter-finals | — | 4–0 | 3–1 | 1–0 |
| 2 | Sarawak United | 6 | 3 | 1 | 2 | 9 | 10 | −1 | 10 | Quarter-finals | 2–2 | — | 1–0 | 1–2 |
| 3 | Sri Pahang | 6 | 2 | 0 | 4 | 11 | 7 | +4 | 6 | | 0–1 | 1–2 | — | 4–0 |
| 4 | Penang | 6 | 1 | 1 | 4 | 4 | 15 | −11 | 4 | | 1–1 | 1–3 | 0–5 | — |

Source: MFL, FAM
26 September 2021
21:00

| Penang | 1–3 | Sarawak United |
|---|---|---|
| Al-Hafiz 56' | Report | Agba 47', 58'; Jones 54' |

City Stadium, George Town
Attendance: 0
Referee: Hamdan Awang
26 September 2021
21:00

| Kuala Lumpur City | 3–1 | Sri Pahang |
|---|---|---|
| Ting 19'; Morales 47', 73' | Report | Gallifuoco 79' (o.g.) |

Kuala Lumpur Stadium, Cheras
Attendance: 0
Referee: Abdul Rahman Wahab

29 September 2021
21:00

| Sarawak United | 1–0 | Sri Pahang |
|---|---|---|
| Tommy 61' | Report |

UiTM Stadium, Shah Alam
Attendance: 0
Referee: Nafeez Abd Wahab
29 September 2021
21:00

| Penang | 1–1 | Kuala Lumpur City |
|---|---|---|
| Boboev 77' | Report | Morales 90+3' |

City Stadium, George Town
Attendance: 0
Referee: Hasrol Amir

30 October 2021
21:00

| Kuala Lumpur City | 4–0 | Sarawak United |
|---|---|---|
| Morales 9', 12'; Partiban 55'; Lambert 60' | Report |

Kuala Lumpur Stadium, Cheras
Attendance: 358
Referee: Zamzaidi Katimin
30 October 2021
21:00

| Sri Pahang | 4–0 | Penang |
|---|---|---|
| Malik 11', 55'; Hidalgo 47'; Yakubu 72' | Report |

Darul Makmur Stadium, Kuantan
Attendance: 500+
Referee: Razlan Joffri Ali

3 November 2021
21:00

| Sarawak United | 2–2 | Kuala Lumpur City |
|---|---|---|
| Agba 22', 40' | Report | Morales 36', 74' |

UiTM Stadium, Shah Alam
Attendance: 0
Referee: Amirul Izwan Yaacob
3 November 2021
21:00

| Penang | 0–5 | Sri Pahang |
|---|---|---|
| | Report | Athiu 10', 35', 82'; Yakubu 21'; Malik 58' |

City Stadium, George Town
Attendance: 932
Referee: Fairuzi Mat Desa

7 November 2021
21:00

| Sri Pahang | 1–2 | Sarawak United |
|---|---|---|
| Athiu 14' | Report | Sandro 31'; Abdul Rahim 90+4' |

Darul Makmur Stadium, Kuantan
Attendance: 1190+
Referee: Jeevanathan M. Ponniamoorthy
7 November 2021
21:00

| Kuala Lumpur City | 1–0 | Penang |
|---|---|---|
| Morales 38' (pen.) | Report |

Kuala Lumpur Stadium, Cheras
Attendance: 415
Referee: Khirulazuan Kidam

10 November 2021
21:00

| Sarawak United | 1–2 | Penang |
|---|---|---|
| Jayaseelan 7' | Report | Firdaus 12'; Amer 43' |

UiTM Stadium, Shah Alam
Attendance: 105
Referee: Nasruddin Tamrin
10 November 2021
21:00

| Sri Pahang | 0–1 | Kuala Lumpur City |
|---|---|---|
| | Report | Zhafri 83' |

Darul Makmur Stadium, Kuantan
Attendance: 116
Referee: Tuan Mohd Yaasin

=== Group B ===
| Pos | Team | Pld | W | D | L | GF | GA | GD | Pts | Qualification | TER | SEL | KUC | PRK |
|---|---|---|---|---|---|---|---|---|---|---|---|---|---|---|
| 1 | Terengganu | 6 | 5 | 1 | 0 | 16 | 4 | +12 | 16 | Quarter-finals | — | 2–1 | 2–0 | 4–0 |
| 2 | Selangor | 6 | 4 | 0 | 2 | 12 | 8 | +4 | 12 | Quarter-finals | 1–3 | — | 5–1 | 1–0 |
| 3 | Kuching City | 6 | 1 | 2 | 3 | 6 | 12 | −6 | 5 | | 1–1 | 1–2 | — | 2–2 |
| 4 | Perak | 6 | 0 | 1 | 5 | 4 | 14 | −10 | 1 | | 1–4 | 1–2 | 0–1 | — |

Source: MFL, FAM
26 September 2021
21:00

| Terengganu | 2–0 | Kuching City |
|---|---|---|
| Tuck 23' (pen.); Faisal 48' | Report |

Sultan Mizan Zainal Abidin Stadium, Kuala Nerus
Attendance: 0
Referee: Ahmad Zuhadi Dzulkifli
26 September 2021
21:00

| Selangor | 1–0 | Perak |
|---|---|---|
| Ifedayo 80' (pen.) | Report |

MBPJ Stadium, Petaling Jaya
Attendance: 0
Referee: Noor Azriel Baharuddin

29 September 2021
21:00

| Terengganu | 2–1 | Selangor |
|---|---|---|
| Marcel 23'; Tuck 52' | Report | Ashmawi 75' |

Sultan Mizan Zainal Abidin Stadium, Kuala Nerus
Attendance: 0
Referee: Nazmi Nasaruddin
29 September 2021
21:00

| Kuching City | 2–2 | Perak |
|---|---|---|
| Hudson 10'; Alif 67' | Report | Adib 47' (pen.); Aizat 69' |

Pasir Gudang Corporation Stadium, Pasir Gudang
Attendance: 0
Referee: Usaid Jamal

30 October 2021
21:00

| Selangor | 5–1 | Kuching City |
|---|---|---|
| Htet Aung 1'; Danial 60', 80'; Safuwan 66' (pen.); Selvaraj 90+4' | Report | Ijezie 11' (pen.) |

MBPJ Stadium, Petaling Jaya
Attendance: 1,400
Referee: Khirulazuan Kidam
30 October 2021
21:00

| Perak | 1–4 | Terengganu |
|---|---|---|
| Agüero 24' (pen.) | Report | Faisal 9'; Danish 47' (o.g.); Tuck 54', 83' |

Perak Stadium, Ipoh
Attendance: 1,248
Referee: Fusser Mad Sallih

3 November 2021
21:00

| Kuching City | 1–2 | Selangor |
|---|---|---|
| Ijezie 67' | Report | Danial 18'; Sharif 90+4' |

Tan Sri Dato' Haji Hassan Yunos Stadium, Larkin
Attendance: 0
Referee: Fitri Maskon
3 November 2021
21:00

| Terengganu | 4–0 | Perak |
|---|---|---|
| Konate 13'; David 20'; Marcel 26'; Faisal 63' (pen.) | Report |

Sultan Mizan Zainal Abidin Stadium, Kuala Nerus
Attendance: 4,200
Referee: Hasrol Amir

7 November 2021
21:00

| Perak | 0–1 | Kuching City |
|---|---|---|
| | Report | Rafiq 72' |

Perak Stadium, Ipoh
Attendance: 230
Referee: Faisal Ridzuan
7 November 2021
21:00

| Selangor | 1–3 | Terengganu |
|---|---|---|
| Shahrel 84' | Report | Faisal 15'; Mintah 72', 90' |

MBPJ Stadium, Petaling Jaya
Attendance: 2,496
Referee: Nafeez Abd Wahab

10 November 2021
21:00

| Kuching City | 1–1 | Terengganu |
|---|---|---|
| Suzuki 46' | Report | Rahmat 19' |

Sarawak Stadium, Kuching
Attendance: 0
Referee: Usaid Jamal
10 November 2021
21:00

| Perak | 1–2 | Selangor |
|---|---|---|
| Royizzat 10' | Report | Selvaraj 72'; Zack 85' |

Perak Stadium, Ipoh
Attendance: 1,388
Referee: Ahmad Zuhadi Dzulkifli

=== Group C ===
| Pos | Team | Pld | W | D | L | GF | GA | GD | Pts | Qualification | MEL | KED | KLU | NSE |
|---|---|---|---|---|---|---|---|---|---|---|---|---|---|---|
| 1 | Melaka United | 6 | 5 | 1 | 0 | 15 | 5 | +10 | 16 | Quarter-finals | — | 2–0 | 2–1 | 2–0 |
| 2 | Kedah Darul Aman | 6 | 4 | 0 | 2 | 13 | 6 | +7 | 12 | Quarter-finals | 1–3 | — | 3–0 | 3–0 (Note: Negeri Sembilan withdrew from the tournament on 22 October 2021, after 20 players and 4 staff members tested positive for COVID-19; this prompted them to withdraw for the safety of all parties and were advised by the team's medical doctor. As according to MFL's rule book, all of Negeri Sembilan's remaining matches were awarded a 3–0 win to the opposing team.) |
| 3 | Kelantan United | 6 | 1 | 1 | 4 | 8 | 12 | −4 | 4 | | 3–3 | 1–3 | — | 0–1 |
| 4 | Negeri Sembilan | 6 | 1 | 0 | 5 | 1 | 14 | −13 | 3 | Withdrew | 0–3 | 0–3 | 0–3 | — |

Source: MFL, FAM
Notes:
27 September 2021
21:00

| Kedah Darul Aman | 3−0 | Kelantan United |
|---|---|---|
| Syazwan 14', 58'; Tchétché 45+2' | Report |

Darul Aman Stadium, Alor Setar
Attendance: 0
Referee: Fusser Mad Sallih
27 September 2021
21:00

| Melaka United | 2−0 | Negeri Sembilan |
|---|---|---|
| Adriano 28'; Kumaahran 65' | Report |

Hang Jebat Stadium, Krubong
Attendance: 0
Referee: Suhaimi Mat Hassan

30 September 2021
21:00

| Kedah Darul Aman | 1−3 | Melaka United |
|---|---|---|
| Sherman 7' | Report | Norde 23'; Ott 38', 52' |

Darul Aman Stadium, Alor Setar
Attendance: 0
Referee: Fairuzi Mat Desa
1 October 2021 (Note: Originally the matches, Kelantan United vs Negeri Sembilan which was supposed to be held on 30 October, and Kelantan United vs Melaka United on 2 November were moved to new date due to Kelantan United and Kelantan FC sharing the same venue, Sultan Muhammad IV Stadium, and some of their matches are to be held on the same date. So, the matches Kelantan United vs Negeri Sembilan was moved to 1 October and Kelantan United vs Melaka United on 1 November.)
21:00

| Kelantan United | 0−1 | Negeri Sembilan |
|---|---|---|
| | Report | Wensley 81' (o.g.) |

Sultan Muhammad IV Stadium, Kota Bharu
Attendance: 0
Referee: Khairulsyahmi Ahmad Khalidi

29 October 2021
21:00

| Melaka United | 2−1 | Kelantan United |
|---|---|---|
| Norde 25'; Adriano 54' | Report | Shuhei 43' |

Hang Jebat Stadium, Krubong
Attendance: 796
Referee: S. Logeswaran
29 October 2021
21:00

| Negeri Sembilan | 0–3 Awarded (Note: Negeri Sembilan were unable to play the final four matches of the group stage due to several team members and officials testing positive for COVID-19. They were considered to have withdrawn from the competition, and the last four remaining matches played by them shall be considered "awarded" a 3–0 win to the opposing team, based on Malaysian Football League's rule book.) | Kedah Darul Aman |
|---|---|---|
| | Report |

Tuanku Abdul Rahman Stadium, Seremban

1 November 2021
21:00

| Kelantan United | 3–3 | Melaka United |
|---|---|---|
| Tanigawa 25'; Gassama 39'; Shafizi 78' | Report | Norde 25'; Kumaahran 55'; Ott 85' |

Sultan Muhammad IV Stadium, Kota Bharu
Attendance: 41
Referee: Abdul Rahman Wahab
2 November 2021
21:00

| Kedah Darul Aman | 3–0 Awarded | Negeri Sembilan |
|---|---|---|
| | Report |

Darul Aman Stadium, Alor Setar

6 November 2021 (Note: The original Matchday 5 matches: Negeri Sembilan vs Kelantan United and Melaka United vs Kedah Darul Aman, and the Matchday 6 matches: Kelantan United vs Kedah Darul Aman and Negeri Sembilan vs Melaka, were switched around so matches from Matchday 5 were moved to Matchday 6 and Matchday 6 to Matchday 5 to avoid the clash of Kelantan United and Kelantan FC venues, where they share the same stadium as their venue for Matchday 6 .)
21:00

| Kelantan United | 1–3 | Kedah Darul Aman |
|---|---|---|
| Fakhrul 73' | Report | Syazwan 34'; Baddrol 36'; Fayadh 85' |

Sultan Muhammad IV Stadium, Kota Bharu
Attendance: 361
Referee: Razlan Joffri Ali
6 November 2021
21:00

| Negeri Sembilan | 0–3 Awarded | Melaka United |
|---|---|---|
| | Report |

Tuanku Abdul Rahman Stadium, Seremban

9 November 2021
21:00

| Negeri Sembilan | 0–3 Awarded | Kelantan United |
|---|---|---|
| | Report |

Tuanku Abdul Rahman Stadium, Seremban
9 November 2021
21:00

| Melaka United | 2−0 | Kedah Darul Aman |
|---|---|---|
| Ott 24'; Gomes 89' | Report |

Hang Jebat Stadium, Malacca
Attendance: 1,399
Referee: Hamdan Awang

=== Group D ===
| Pos | Team | Pld | W | D | L | GF | GA | GD | Pts | Qualification | JDT | SBH | PJC | KEL |
|---|---|---|---|---|---|---|---|---|---|---|---|---|---|---|
| 1 | Johor Darul Ta'zim | 6 | 6 | 0 | 0 | 14 | 1 | +13 | 18 | Quarter-finals | — | 3–0 | 1–0 | 2–0 |
| 2 | Sabah | 6 | 2 | 2 | 2 | 6 | 9 | −3 | 8 | Quarter-finals | 0–2 | — | 1–0 | 2–1 |
| 3 | Petaling Jaya City | 6 | 1 | 2 | 3 | 5 | 6 | −1 | 5 | | 1–2 | 1–1 | — | 3–1 |
| 4 | Kelantan | 6 | 0 | 2 | 4 | 4 | 13 | −9 | 2 | | 0–4 | 2–2 | 0–0 | — |

Source: MFL, FAM
27 September 2021
21:00

| Johor Darul Ta'zim | 2−0 | Kelantan |
|---|---|---|
| Bergson 30' (pen.); Safawi 49' | Report |

Sultan Ibrahim Stadium, Iskandar Puteri
Attendance: 0
Referee: Jeevanathan M. Ponniamoorthy
27 September 2021
21:00

| Petaling Jaya City | 1−1 | Sabah |
|---|---|---|
| Darren 80' | Report | Park 20' |

MBPJ Stadium, Petaling Jaya
Attendance: 0
Referee: Zulkarnain Zakaria

30 September 2021
16:45

| Kelantan | 2−2 | Sabah |
|---|---|---|
| Siringoringo 39'; Haziq 70' | Report | Mitrevski 32' (pen.), 80' (pen.) |

Sultan Muhammad IV Stadium, Kota Bharu
Attendance: 0
Referee: Fitri Maskon
30 September 2021
21:00

| Johor Darul Ta'zim | 1−0 | Petaling Jaya City |
|---|---|---|
| Cabrera 3' | Report |

Sultan Ibrahim Stadium, Iskandar Puteri
Attendance: 0
Referee: Razlan Joffri Ali

29 October 2021
20:15

| Sabah | 0–2 | Johor Darul Ta'zim |
|---|---|---|
| | Report | Hazwan 5'; Cabrera 13' |

Likas Stadium, Kota Kinabalu
Attendance: 4,729
Referee: Tuan Mohd Yaasin
29 October 2021
21:00

| Petaling Jaya City | 3−1 | Kelantan |
|---|---|---|
| Darren 10', 81'; Kogileswaran 19' | Report | Intzidis 36' |

MBPJ Stadium, Petaling Jaya
Attendance: 356
Referee: Kamil Zakaria

2 November 2021
21:00

| Kelantan | 0–0 | Petaling Jaya City |
|---|---|---|
| | Report |

Sultan Muhammad IV Stadium, Kota Bharu
Attendance: 403
Referee: Hamdan Awang
2 November 2021
21:00

| Johor Darul Ta'zim | 3–0 | Sabah |
|---|---|---|
| Velázquez 6'; Bergson 34' (pen.), 90+3' | Report |

Sultan Ibrahim Stadium, Iskandar Puteri
Attendance: 8,699
Referee: Zulkarnain Zakaria

6 November 2021
20:15

| Sabah | 2–1 | Kelantan |
|---|---|---|
| Amri 7' (pen.); Sahrizan 90+1' | Report | Safwan 5' |

Likas Stadium, Kota Kinabalu
Attendance: 2,256
Referee: Zamzaidi Katimin
6 November 2021
21:00

| Petaling Jaya City | 1−2 | Johor Darul Ta'zim |
|---|---|---|
| Ruventhiran 11' | Report | Bergson 14' (pen.); Mauricio 28' |

MBPJ Stadium, Petaling Jaya
Attendance: 1,036
Referee: Fusser Mad Sallih

9 November 2021
21:00

| Kelantan | 0−4 | Johor Darul Ta'zim |
|---|---|---|
| | Report | Syafiq 48'; Velázquez 60' (pen.); Guilherme 62'; Shahrul 90+1' |

Sultan Muhammad IV Stadium, Kota Bharu
Attendance: 1,038
Referee: Kamil Zakaria
9 November 2021
21:00

| Sabah | 1−0 | Petaling Jaya City |
|---|---|---|
| Mitrevski 21' (pen.) | Report |

Likas Stadium, Kota Kinabalu
Attendance: 3,217
Referee: Zulkarnain Zakaria
