= 2021 Malaysia Cup knockout stage =

Knockout stage of 2021 Malaysia Cup

The 2021 Malaysia Cup knockout stage began on 14 November and ended on 30 November 2021 with the final at the Bukit Jalil National Stadium in Kuala Lumpur, Malaysia, to decide the champions of the 2021 Malaysia Cup. A total of 8 teams competed in the knockout stage.

The top two teams from every four groups from the group stage advancing to the knockout stage beginning with the quarter-finals followed by the semi-finals and the final. This stage will be played in two legs except for the finals which is played once.

== Round and draw dates ==
The schedule was as follows (all draws were held on 15 September 2021 at the Malaysian Football League (MFL) headquarters in Putrajaya, Malaysia).

Round	First leg	Second leg
Quarter-finals	14 November 2021	18 November 2021
Semi-finals	22 November 2021	26 November 2021
Final	30 November 2021 at Bukit Jalil National Stadium, Kuala Lumpur	

== Format ==
The knockout phase involves the eight teams which qualified as the winners or runners-up of each of the four groups in the group stage.

Each tie in the knockout phase was played over two legs, apart from the final, with each team playing one leg at home. The team that scored more goals on aggregate over the two legs advanced to the next round. If the aggregate score was level, the away goals rule was applied, i.e. the team that scored more goals away from home over the two legs advanced. If away goals were also equal, then thirty minutes of extra time was played. The away goals rule was again applied after extra time, i.e. if there were goals scored during extra time and the aggregate score was still level, the visiting team advanced by virtue of more away goals scored. If no goals were scored during extra time, the tie was decided by penalty shoot-out. In the final, which was played as a single match, if scores were level at the end of normal time, extra time was played, followed by a penalty shoot-out if scores remained tied.

The mechanism of the draws for each round was as follows:

- In the draw for the quarter-final, the four group winners were seeded, and the four group runners-up were unseeded. The seeded teams were drawn against the unseeded teams, with the seeded teams hosting the second leg. Teams from the same group or the same association could not be drawn against each other.
- In the draws for the quarter-finals onwards, there were no seedings, and teams from the same group or the same association could be drawn against each other.

== Qualified teams ==
The knockout phase involved the 8 teams which qualified as winners and runners-up of each of the eight groups in the group stage.

Group	Winners	Runners-up
A	Kuala Lumpur City	Sarawak United
B	Terengganu	Selangor
C	Melaka United	Kedah Darul Aman
D	Johor Darul Ta'zim	Sabah

== Bracket ==
Quarter-finals
Selangor	0	0	0
Kuala Lumpur City	2	1	3
Sabah	0	1	1
Melaka United	1	2	3
Terengganu	2	4	6
Sarawak United	1	2	3
Kedah Darul Aman	0	0	0
Johor Darul Ta'zim	0	1	1

Semi-finals
Kuala Lumpur City (p)	1	1	2 (5)
Melaka United	1	1	2 (3)
Terengganu	1	0	1
Johor Darul Ta'zim	1	3	4

Final
Kuala Lumpur City	2
Johor Darul Ta'zim	0

== Quarter-finals ==
=== Summary ===
The first legs were played on 14 November, and the second legs were played on 18 November 2021.

Team 1	Agg.	Team 2	1st leg	2nd leg
Sabah	1–3	Melaka United	0–1	1–2
Selangor	0–3	Kuala Lumpur City	0–2	0–1
Terengganu	6–3	Sarawak United	2–1	4–2
Kedah Darul Aman	0–1	Johor Darul Ta'zim	0–0	0–1

=== Matches ===
14 November 2021
20:15 UTC+8

Sabah	0–1	Melaka United
	Report	Norde 52'

Likas Stadium, Kota Kinabalu
Attendance: 7,213
Referee: Ahmad Zuhadi Dzulkifli
18 November 2021
21:00 UTC+8

Melaka United	2–1	Sabah
Adriano 3'; Norde 78'	Report	Mitrevski 90+4' (pen.)

Likas Stadium, Kota Kinabalu
Attendance: 7,213
Referee: Fairuzi Mat Desa

Melaka United won 3–1 on aggregate.

14 November 2021
21:00 UTC+8

Selangor	0–2	Kuala Lumpur City
	Report	Morales 14'; Hadin 82'

MBPJ Stadium, Petaling Jaya
Attendance: 3,146
Referee: Nafeez Abd Wahab
18 November 2021
21:00 UTC+8

Kuala Lumpur City	1–0	Selangor
Morales 50'	Report

Kuala Lumpur Stadium, Cheras
Attendance: 4,115
Referee: Nazmi Nasaruddin

Kuala Lumpur City won 3–0 on aggregate.

14 November 2021
21:00 UTC+8

Terengganu	2–1	Sarawak United
Faisal 17'; Faiz 51'	Report	Shahrul 22' (o.g.)

Sultan Mizan Zainal Abidin Stadium, Kuala Nerus
Attendance: 8,717
Referee: Hasrol Amir
18 November 2021
21:00 UTC+8

Sarawak United	2–4	Terengganu
Sandro 71'; Agba 89'	Report	Mintah 2', 64'; Faisal 12'; Faiz 45'

UiTM Stadium, Shah Alam
Attendance: 2,093
Referee: Fusser Mad Sallih

Terengganu won 6–3 on aggregate.

14 November 2021
21:00 UTC+8

Kedah Darul Aman	0–0	Johor Darul Ta'zim
	Report

Darulaman Stadium, Alor Setar
Attendance: 7,159
Referee: Razlan Joffri Ali
18 November 2021
21:00 UTC+8

Johor Darul Ta'zim	1–0	Kedah Darul Aman
Arif Aiman 40'	Report

Sultan Ibrahim Stadium, Iskandar Puteri
Attendance: 16,209
Referee: Zulkarnain Zakaria

Johor Darul Ta'zim won 1–0 on aggregate.

== Semi-finals ==
=== Summary ===
The first legs were played on 22 November, and the second legs were played on 26 November 2021.

Team 1	Agg.	Team 2	1st leg	2nd leg
Kuala Lumpur City	2–2 (5–3 p)	Melaka United	1–1	1–1 (a.e.t.)
Terengganu	1–4	Johor Darul Ta'zim	1–1	0–3

=== Matches ===
22 November 2021
21:00 UTC+8

Kuala Lumpur City	1–1	Melaka United
Zhafri 28'	Report	Adriano 8'

Kuala Lumpur Stadium, Cheras
Attendance: 0 (Note: The match was played behind closed doors due to a pitch invasion by KL City fans on the second leg in the quarter-final match against Selangor.)
Referee: Hasrol Amir
26 November 2021
21:00 UTC+8

Melaka United	1–1 (a.e.t.)	Kuala Lumpur City
Syamim 65'	Report	Partiban 9'
Penalties
Adriano (penalty scored); Ott (penalty scored); Gomes (penalty missed); Norde (penalty scored)	3–5	Josué (penalty scored); Morales (penalty scored); Indra (penalty scored); Hadin (penalty scored); Gallifuoco (penalty scored)

Hang Jebat Stadium, Krubong
Attendance: 17,500
Referee: Fusser Mad Sallih

2–2 on aggregate. Kuala Lumpur City won 5–3 on penalties.

22 November 2021
21:00 UTC+8

Terengganu	1–1	Johor Darul Ta'zim
Mintah 8'	Report	Bergson 50'

Sultan Mizan Zainal Abidin Stadium, Kuala Nerus
Attendance: 20,000
Referee: Tuan Mohd Yassin
26 November 2021
21:00 UTC+8

Johor Darul Ta'zim	3–0	Terengganu
Bergson 7', 14'; Cabrera 11'	Report

Sultan Ibrahim Stadium, Iskandar Puteri
Attendance: 17,430
Referee: Nazmi Nasaruddin

Johor Darul Ta'zim won 4–1 on aggregate.

== Final ==
The final was played at the Bukit Jalil National Stadium in Kuala Lumpur on 30 November 2021.

30 November 2021
21:00 UTC+8

Kuala Lumpur City	2–0	Johor Darul Ta'zim
Zhafri 66'; Josué 74'	Report

Bukit Jalil National Stadium, Kuala Lumpur
Attendance: 19,852
Referee: Razlan Joffri Ali
