= Zahril Azri =

Malaysian association football player

Personal information
- Full name: Muhammad Zahril Azri bin Zabri
- Date of birth: 4 February 1999 (age 27)
- Place of birth: Penang, Malaysia
- Height: 1.76 m (5 ft 9 in)
- Position: Defensive midfielder

Team information
- Current team: Melaka
- Number: 6

Youth career
- –2018: Felda United

Senior career*
Years	Team	Apps	(Gls)
2018–2019	Felda United	22	(1)
2019–2020	Selangor II	4	(0)
2020	Selangor	1	(0)
2021	Sarawak United	24	(0)
2022–2023	Selangor	3	(0)
2023	→ Penang (loan)	12	(0)
2024–2025	Kuala Lumpur Rovers	14	(0)
2025–2026	Negeri Sembilan	11	(0)
2026–	Melaka		

International career^{‡}
2017–2018	Malaysia U19	17	(0)
Medal record
AFF U-19 Youth Championship
First place	2018 Indonesia
Second place	2017 Myanmar
- * Club domestic league appearances and goals as of 8 June 2026 ‡ National team caps and goals as of 14 July 2018

Muhammad Zahril Azri bin Zabri (born 4 February 1999) is a Malaysian footballer who play as a defensive midfielder for Malaysia Super League club Melaka.

== Club career ==
=== Negeri Sembilan ===
On June 24, 2025, Zahril was announced as a new signing for Negeri Sembilan ahead of the 2025–26 season. At Negeri Sembilan, he trained under newly appointed head coach Nidzam Jamil.

== International career ==
=== Youth ===
Zahril was part of the national team for the 2017 AFF U-18 Youth Championship that will take place in Yangon, Myanmar. On 26 October 2017, he was selected to play in 2018 AFC U-19 Championship qualification in Paju, South Korea.

Zahril was named in the Malaysia under 19 squad for 2018 AFF U-19 Youth Championship in the Indonesia. He has played in the final against Myanmar which Malaysia win 4–3.

On 15 October 2018, he was named in the under-19 side for the 2018 AFC U-19 Championship.

== Career statistics ==
=== Club ===
As of match played 8 June 2026

Appearances and goals by club, season and competition
Club	Season	League			Cup (Note: Appearances in Malaysia FA Cup)		League Cup (Note: Appearances in Malaysia Cup)		Total	
Club	Season	Division	Apps	Goals	Apps	Goals	Apps	Goals	Apps	Goals
Felda United	2018	Malaysia Premier League	7	0	1	0	7	1	15	1
Felda United	2019	Malaysia Super League	15	1	4	0	1	0	20	1
Felda United	Total		22	1	5	0	8	1	35	2
Selangor II	2020	Malaysia Premier League	4	0	–				4	0
Selangor	2020	Malaysia Super League	1	0	0	0	0	0	1	0
Sarawak United	2021	Malaysia Premier League	17	0	–		7	0	24	0
Selangor	2022	Malaysia Super League	5	0	1	0	0	0	6	0
Penang (loan)	2023	Malaysia Super League	12	0	2	0	0	0	14	0
Kuala Lumpur Rovers	2024–25	A1 Semi-Pro	14	0	1	0	0	0	15	0
Negeri Sembilan	2025–26	Malaysia Super League	11	0	2	0	1	0	14	0
Career total			86	1	11	0	16	1	113	2

== Honours ==
=== Club ===
Felda United

- Malaysia Premier League : 2018

=== International ===
Malaysia U-19

- AFF U-19 Youth Championship: 2018, runner-up: 2017
