= Tim Heubach =

German footballer

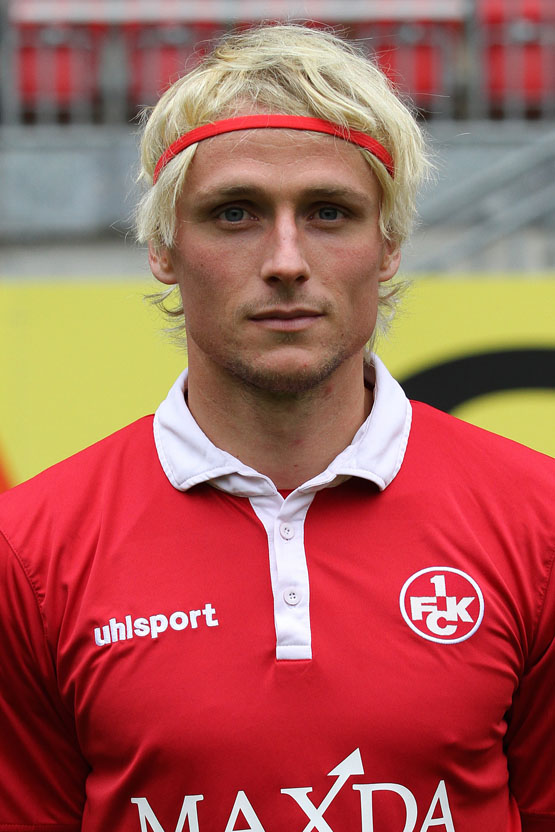
- Heubach with 1. FC Kaiserslautern in 2015

Personal information
- Date of birth: 12 April 1988 (age 38)
- Place of birth: Neuss, West Germany
- Height: 1.92 m (6 ft 4 in)
- Position: Centre-back

Youth career
- 1993–2002: BV Weckhoven
- 2002–2004: TSV Norf
- 2004–2006: Borussia Mönchengladbach

Senior career*
| Years | Team | Apps | (Gls) |
| 2006–2012 | Borussia Mönchengladbach II | 131 | (12) |
| 2012–2014 | FSV Frankfurt | 29 | (1) |
| 2014 | 1. FC Kaiserslautern II | 1 | (0) |
| 2014–2017 | 1. FC Kaiserslautern | 62 | (1) |
| 2017–2020 | Maccabi Netanya | 75 | (6) |
| 2021 | Selangor | 7 | (0) |
| Total | | 305 | (20) |
- * Club domestic league appearances and goals

Tim Heubach (born 12 May 1988) is a German former professional footballer who played as a centre-back.

== Career ==
On 15 July 2014, it was announced that Heubach would join 1. FC Kaiserslautern on an immediate transfer. Since he still had a contract at FSV Frankfurt until 2015, Kaiserslautern had to pay a reported transfer fee of €400,000. He signed for Kaiserslautern until 2017. In June 2017, at the end of his contract, Heubach left the club.

Heubach announced his retirement from playing in January 2022.

== Career statistics ==
Appearances and goals by club, season and competition
| Club | Season | League | | | National cup (Note: Includes Malaysia FA Cup, DFB-Pokal, Israel State Cup) | | League cup (Note: Includes Malaysia Cup, Toto Cup) | | Continental (Note: Includes AFC Champions League, AFC Cup, UEFA Champions League, UEFA Europa League) | | Total | |
| Club | Season | Division | Apps | Goals | Apps | Goals | Apps | Goals | Apps | Goals | Apps | Goals |
|---|---|---|---|---|---|---|---|---|---|---|---|---|
| Borussia Mönchengladbach II | 2006–07 | Regionalliga Nord | 5 | 0 | — | | — | | — | | 5 | 0 |
| Borussia Mönchengladbach II | 2007–08 | Oberliga Nordrhein | 17 | 2 | — | | — | | — | | 17 | 2 |
| Borussia Mönchengladbach II | 2008–09 | Regionalliga | 24 | 0 | — | | — | | — | | 24 | 0 |
| Borussia Mönchengladbach II | 2009–10 | Regionalliga West | 30 | 1 | — | | — | | — | | 30 | 1 |
| Borussia Mönchengladbach II | 2010–11 | Regionalliga West | 27 | 2 | — | | — | | — | | 27 | 2 |
| Borussia Mönchengladbach II | 2011–12 | Regionalliga West | 28 | 7 | — | | — | | — | | 28 | 7 |
| Borussia Mönchengladbach II | Total | | 131 | 12 | 0 | 0 | 0 | 0 | 0 | 0 | 131 | 12 |
| Borussia Mönchengladbach | 2008–09 | Bundesliga | 0 | 0 | 0 | 0 | 0 | 0 | — | | 0 | 0 |
| FSV Frankfurt | 2012–13 | 2. Bundesliga | 22 | 1 | 2 | 0 | 0 | 0 | — | | 24 | 1 |
| FSV Frankfurt | 2013–14 | 2. Bundesliga | 7 | 0 | 0 | 0 | 0 | 0 | — | | 7 | 0 |
| FSV Frankfurt | Total | | 29 | 1 | 2 | 0 | 0 | 0 | 0 | 0 | 31 | 1 |
| 1. FC Kaiserslautern II | 2014–15 | Regionalliga Südwest | 1 | 0 | — | | — | | — | | 1 | 0 |
| 1. FC Kaiserslautern | 2014–15 | 2. Bundesliga | 16 | 0 | 2 | 0 | 0 | 0 | — | | 18 | 0 |
| 1. FC Kaiserslautern | 2015–16 | 2. Bundesliga | 20 | 1 | 2 | 0 | 0 | 0 | — | | 22 | 1 |
| 1. FC Kaiserslautern | 2016–17 | 2. Bundesliga | 26 | 0 | 1 | 0 | 0 | 0 | — | | 27 | 0 |
| 1. FC Kaiserslautern | Total | | 62 | 1 | 5 | 0 | 0 | 0 | 0 | 0 | 67 | 1 |
| Maccabi Netanya | 2017–18 | Israeli Premier League | 30 | 2 | 1 | 0 | 2 | 0 | — | | 33 | 2 |
| Maccabi Netanya | 2018–19 | Israeli Premier League | 27 | 1 | 4 | 0 | 5 | 0 | — | | 36 | 1 |
| Maccabi Netanya | 2019–20 | Israeli Premier League | 18 | 3 | 2 | 0 | 4 | 0 | — | | 24 | 3 |
| Maccabi Netanya | Total | | 75 | 6 | 7 | 0 | 11 | 0 | 0 | 0 | 93 | 6 |
| Selangor | 2021 | Malaysia Super League | 7 | 0 | 0 | 0 | 0 | 0 | — | | 7 | 0 |
| Career total | | | 305 | 20 | 14 | 0 | 11 | 0 | 0 | 0 | 330 | 20 |
