= 2021 Malaysia Cup =

Piala Malaysia 2021

Tournament details
- Country: Malaysia
- Dates: 26 September – 30 November 2021
- Teams: 16

Final positions
- Champions: Kuala Lumpur City (4th title)
- Runners-up: Johor Darul Ta'zim

Tournament statistics
- Matches played: 61
- Goals scored: 168 (2.75 per match)
- Top goal scorer(s): (10 goals); Romel Morales

The 2021 Malaysia Cup (Malay: Piala Malaysia 2021) was the 95th edition of Malaysia Cup tournament organised by the Football Association of Malaysia (FAM) and the Malaysian Football League (MFL).

The defending champions were Johor Darul Ta'zim, who won it in the 2019 edition, as the 2020 edition was cancelled midway during the tournament due to the COVID-19 pandemic in Malaysia. In the final, they lost 2–0 to Kuala Lumpur City, who won their fourth title. As winners, Kuala Lumpur City qualified for the 2022 AFC Cup.

== Format ==
In the competition, the top eleven teams from the 2021 Malaysia Super League were joined by the top five teams from the 2021 Malaysia Premier League. The competition will begin with a group stage where only the 2 highest placing teams in each group would qualify to the knockout stage.

== Schedule and draw dates ==
The draw for the 2021 Malaysia Cup was held on 15 September 2021.

Phase	Round	First leg	Second leg
Group stage	Matchday 1	26–27 September 2021	
Group stage	Matchday 2	29 September–1 October 2021	
Group stage	Matchday 3	29–30 October 2021	
Group stage	Matchday 4	1–3 November 2021	
Group stage	Matchday 5	6–7 November 2021	
Group stage	Matchday 6	9–10 November 2021	
Knockout phase	Quarter-finals	14 November 2021	18 November 2021
Knockout phase	Semi-finals	22 November 2021	26 November 2021
Knockout phase	Final	30 November 2021	

== Seeding ==
They were divided to their pots by their placements from the 2021 Malaysia Super League to 2021 Malaysia Premier League, so pot 1 includes the top 4 teams from the Super League, pot 2 with those place 5th to 8th, pot 3 with those placed 9th to 11th together with the 1st placed team from the Premier League, and pot 4 with those placed 2 to 5.

Pot 1	Pot 2	Pot 3	Pot 4
Johor Darul Ta'zim; Kedah Darul Aman; Penang; Terengganu	Selangor; Kuala Lumpur City; Petaling Jaya; Melaka United	Sabah; Sri Pahang; Perak; Negeri Sembilan	Sarawak United; Kuching City; Kelantan; Kelantan United

== Group stage ==
=== Group A ===
Pos	Team	Pld	W	D	L	GF	GA	GD	Pts	Qualification	KUL	SUD	PAH	PEN
1	Kuala Lumpur City	6	4	2	0	12	4	+8	14	Quarter-finals	—	4–0	3–1	1–0
2	Sarawak United	6	3	1	2	9	10	−1	10	Quarter-finals	2–2	—	1–0	1–2
3	Sri Pahang	6	2	0	4	11	7	+4	6		0–1	1–2	—	4–0
4	Penang	6	1	1	4	4	15	−11	4		1–1	1–3	0–5	—

Source: MFL, FAM

=== Group B ===
Pos	Team	Pld	W	D	L	GF	GA	GD	Pts	Qualification	TER	SEL	KUC	PRK
1	Terengganu	6	5	1	0	16	4	+12	16	Quarter-finals	—	2–1	2–0	4–0
2	Selangor	6	4	0	2	12	8	+4	12	Quarter-finals	1–3	—	5–1	1–0
3	Kuching City	6	1	2	3	6	12	−6	5		1–1	1–2	—	2–2
4	Perak	6	0	1	5	4	14	−10	1		1–4	1–2	0–1	—

Source: MFL, FAM

=== Group C ===
Pos	Team	Pld	W	D	L	GF	GA	GD	Pts	Qualification	MEL	KED	KLU	NSE
1	Melaka United	6	5	1	0	15	5	+10	16	Quarter-finals	—	2–0	2–1	2–0
2	Kedah Darul Aman	6	4	0	2	13	6	+7	12	Quarter-finals	1–3	—	3–0	3–0 (Note: Negeri Sembilan withdrew from the tournament on 22 October 2021, after 20 players and 4 staff members tested positive for COVID-19; this prompted them to withdraw for the safety of all parties and were advised by the team's medical doctor. As according to MFL's rule book, all of Negeri Sembilan's remaining matches were awarded a 3–0 win to the opposing team.)
3	Kelantan United	6	1	1	4	8	12	−4	4		3–3	1–3	—	0–1
4	Negeri Sembilan	6	1	0	5	1	14	−13	3	Withdrew	0–3	0–3	0–3	—

Source: MFL, FAM

=== Group D ===
Pos	Team	Pld	W	D	L	GF	GA	GD	Pts	Qualification	JDT	SBH	PJC	KEL
1	Johor Darul Ta'zim	6	6	0	0	14	1	+13	18	Quarter-finals	—	3–0	1–0	2–0
2	Sabah	6	2	2	2	6	9	−3	8	Quarter-finals	0–2	—	1–0	2–1
3	Petaling Jaya City	6	1	2	3	5	6	−1	5		1–2	1–1	—	3–1
4	Kelantan	6	0	2	4	4	13	−9	2		0–4	2–2	0–0	—

Source: MFL, FAM

== Knockout stage ==
In the knockout phase, teams played against each other over two legs on a home-and-away basis, except for the final which was played as a single-leg game. The mechanism of the draws for each round was as follows:

- In the draw for the quarter-final, the fourth group winners were seeded, and the fourth group runners-up were unseeded. The seeded teams were drawn against the unseeded teams, with the seeded teams hosting the second leg. Teams from the same group or the same association could not be drawn against each other.
- In the draws for the quarter-finals onwards, there were no seedings, and teams from the same group or the same association could be drawn against each other.

=== Bracket ===
Quarter-finals
Selangor	0	0	0
Kuala Lumpur City	2	1	3
Sabah	0	1	1
Melaka United	1	2	3
Terengganu	2	4	6
Sarawak United	1	2	3
Kedah Darul Aman	0	0	0
Johor Darul Ta'zim	0	1	1

Semi-finals
Kuala Lumpur City (p)	1	1	2 (5)
Melaka United	1	1	2 (3)
Terengganu	1	0	1
Johor Darul Ta'zim	1	3	4

Final
Kuala Lumpur City	2
Johor Darul Ta'zim	0

=== Quarter-finals ===
The first legs were played on 14 November, and the second legs were played on 18 November 2021.

Team 1	Agg.	Team 2	1st leg	2nd leg
Sabah	1–3	Melaka United	0–1	1–2
Selangor	0–3	Kuala Lumpur City	0–2	0–1
Terengganu	6–3	Sarawak United	2–1	4–2
Kedah Darul Aman	0–1	Johor Darul Ta'zim	0–0	0–1

=== Semi-finals ===
The first legs were played on 22 November, and the second legs were played on 26 November 2021.

Team 1	Agg.	Team 2	1st leg	2nd leg
Kuala Lumpur City	2–2 (5–3 p)	Melaka United	1–1	1–1 (a.e.t.)
Terengganu	1–4	Johor Darul Ta'zim	1–1	0–3

=== Final ===
The final was played at the Bukit Jalil National Stadium in Kuala Lumpur on 30 November 2021.

30 November 2021
21:00 UTC+8

Kuala Lumpur City	2–0	Johor Darul Ta'zim
Zhafri 66'; Josué 74'	Report

Bukit Jalil National Stadium, Kuala Lumpur
Attendance: 19,852
Referee: Razlan Joffri Ali

== Statistics ==
=== Goalscorers ===
Players sorted first by goals, then by name.

Rank	Player	Club	Goals
1	(Colombia) Romel Morales	Kuala Lumpur City	10
2	(Brazil) Bergson	Johor Darul Tazim	8
3	(Malaysia) Faisal Halim	Terengganu	6
4	(Haiti) Sony Norde	Melaka United	5
4	(Nigeria) Uche Agba	Sarawak United	5
4	(Ghana) Jordan Mintah	Terengganu	5
7	(Brazil) Adriano Narcizo	Melaka United	4
7	(Philippines) Manny Ott	Melaka United	4
7	(North Macedonia) Risto Mitrevski	Sabah	4
7	(South Sudan) Kenny Athiu	Sri Pahang	4
7	(England) Lee Tuck	Terengganu	4

Notes: (H) – Home team (A) – Away team

== Winners ==
2021 Malaysia Cup Winner

4th title

== See also ==
- 2021 Piala Sumbangsih
- 2021 Malaysia Super League
- 2021 Malaysia Premier League
