= Abubakari Yakubu =

Ghanaian footballer (1981-2017)

Personal information
- Full name: Abubakari Yakubu
- Date of birth: 13 December 1981
- Place of birth: Tema, Ghana
- Date of death: 31 October 2017 (aged 35)
- Place of death: Tema, Ghana
- Height: 1.78 m (5 ft 10 in)
- Positions: Midfielder; defender

Youth career
- Great Mariners
- Ajax

Senior career*
Years	Team	Apps	(Gls)
1999–2005	Ajax	65	(0)
2004–2005	→ Vitesse (loan)	31	(0)
2005–2009	Vitesse	49	(0)
Total		145	(0)

International career
2002–2006	Ghana	16	(0)
- * Club domestic league appearances and goals

Abubakari Yakubu (13 December 1981 – 31 October 2017) was a Ghanaian footballer who played mainly as a defensive midfielder but also as a defender.

== Club career ==
Born in Tema, Yakubu joined Ajax at only 17, going on to remain in the Netherlands for one full decade. He made his Eredivisie debut on 19 April 2000, playing 50 minutes in a 1–1 away draw against Den Bosch and finishing his first season with only five matches.

Yakubu played in an average of 15 league games in the following four years, going on to make 89 competitive appearances and helping the Amsterdam side to two national championships and the 2001–02 edition of the Dutch Cup. During the 2002–03 campaign, he featured in five matches in the UEFA Champions League, in a quarter-final run that ended at the hands of eventual champions A.C. Milan; he spent 2004–05 on loan to fellow league team Vitesse.

In the ensuing off-season, Yakubu signed permanently with the latter club for four more years, being intermittently used during four seasons and released in the summer of 2009. In early October, he had an unsuccessful trial with 1860 Munich from Germany.

== International career ==
Yakubu played for Ghana at every youth level, having represented the nation at under-17, under-20 and under-23 levels. He earned 16 full caps, being part of the Ratomir Dujković-led side at the 2006 Africa Cup of Nations in which they suffered a group stage exit.

Yakubu also took part in the 2006 FIFA World Cup qualifying stage, helping his country to a first-ever presence in the competition but being omitted from the final squad.

== Death ==
On 31 October 2017, Yakubu died at the Tema General Hospital in his native city at the age of 35, after battling an undisclosed illness.

== Honours ==
Ajax

- Eredivisie: 2001–02, 2003–04
- KNVB Cup: 2001–02
- Johan Cruyff Shield: 2002
