= Sahran Abdul Samad =

Malaysian footballer

Personal information
- Full name: Sahran bin Abdul Samad
- Date of birth: 5 February 1983 (age 43)
- Place of birth: Sandakan, Sabah, Malaysia
- Height: 1.78 m (5 ft 10 in)
- Position: Defender

Team information
- Current team: Kuching City
- Number: 5

Senior career*
Years	Team	Apps	(Gls)
2011–2013	Sarawak	26	(0)
2018–	Kuching City	2	(0)
- * Club domestic league appearances and goals as of 10 June 2013

Sahran bin Abdul Samad (born 5 February 1983 in Sabah) is a Malaysian footballer who plays as defender.
