= Jordan Ayimbila =

Ghanaian footballer (born 2001)

Personal information
- Full name: Jordan Ayimbila
- Date of birth: 14 February 2001 (age 25)
- Place of birth: Accra, Ghana
- Height: 1.85 m (6 ft 1 in)
- Positions: Centre back; left back

Team information
- Current team: Chattanooga Red Wolves
- Number: 33

Youth career
- 2017: Accra Lions
- 2021–2022: → Selangor II (loan)

Senior career*
Years	Team	Apps	(Gls)
2017–2022	Accra Lions		
2021–2022	→ Selangor (loan)	17	(0)
2022	→ San Antonio FC (loan)	8	(1)
2023	Las Vegas Lights	12	(0)
2024	Miami FC	20	(0)
2025–	Chattanooga Red Wolves	61	(3)
- * Club domestic league appearances and goals as of October 31, 2026

Jordan Ayimbila (born 14 February 2001) is a Ghanaian professional footballer who plays for Chattanooga Red Wolves in the USL League One.

== Club career ==
=== Accra Lions ===
Born in Accra, Ayimbila started his youth career with the Accra Lions academy. Although initially, he played as a forward, then he later switched to centre back position.

=== Selangor ===
On 20 January 2021, Ayimbila moved on loan to Malaysia Super League club side, Selangor. He represent for Selangor II at Malaysia second division football for the 2021 season. He made his debut with senior on 13 March 2021, playing full 90-minutes in a 1–1 home draw against Kuala Lumpur City.

== Career statistics ==
=== Club ===
As of 21 August 2021

Club	Season	League			Cup (Note: Includes Malaysia FA Cup)		League Cup (Note: Includes Malaysia Cup)		Continental (Note: Includes AFC Champions League and AFC Cup)		Total	
Club	Season	Division	Apps	Goals	Apps	Goals	Apps	Goals	Apps	Goals	Apps	Goals
Selangor	2021	Malaysia Premier League	3	0	0	0	0	0	—		3	0
Selangor	2021	Malaysia Super League	17	0	0	0	7	0	—		24	0
Selangor	Total		20	0	0	0	0	0	0	0	27	0
Career total			20	0	0	0	0	0	0	0	27	0
