= Manuel Konrad =

German footballer (born 1988)

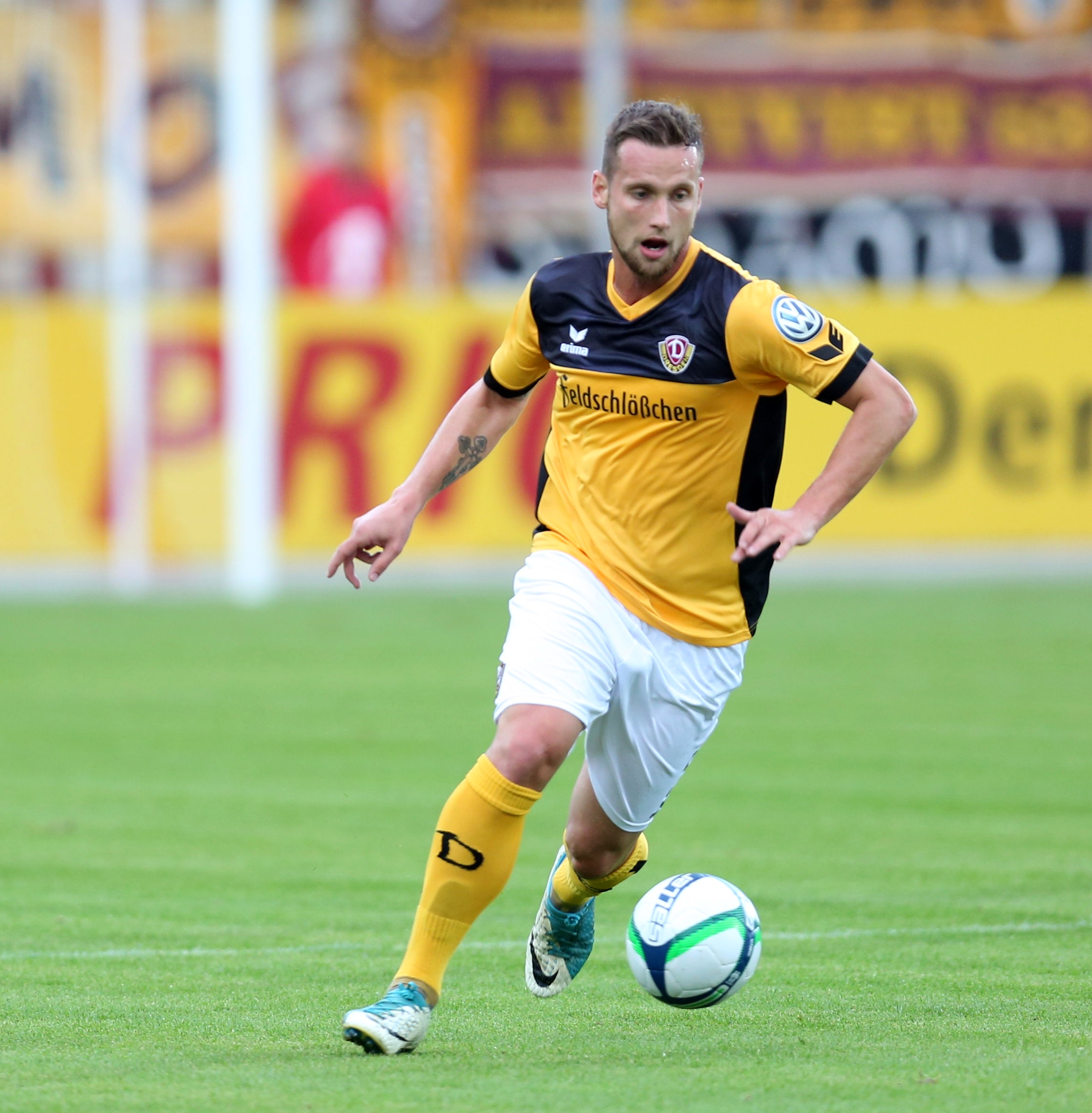
- Konrad with Dynamo Dresden in 2017

Personal information
- Full name: Manuel Anton Konrad
- Date of birth: 14 April 1988 (age 38)
- Place of birth: Illertissen, West Germany
- Height: 1.87 m (6 ft 2 in)
- Position: Midfielder

Team information
- Current team: FV Biberach

Youth career
- TSV Obenhausen
- 1998–2001: TSV Neu-Ulm
- 2001–2003: SSV Ulm
- 2003–2005: SC Freiburg

Senior career*
Years	Team	Apps	(Gls)
2005–2009	SC Freiburg	4	(0)
2005–2009	SC Freiburg II	13	(2)
2009	→ SpVgg Unterhaching (loan)	17	(1)
2009	→ SpVgg Unterhaching II (loan)	2	(0)
2009–2010	SpVgg Unterhaching	34	(3)
2010–2016	FSV Frankfurt	155	(3)
2010–2016	FSV Frankfurt II	16	(0)
2016–2018	Dynamo Dresden	41	(4)
2018–2020	KFC Uerdingen 05	59	(1)
2021	Selangor	13	(0)
2022–2023	Sonnenhof Großaspach	13	(2)
2023–2024	FC Memmingen	42	(4)
2024–	FV Biberach	0	(0)

International career^{‡}
2007	Germany U19	4	(0)
2007–2008	Germany U20	6	(0)
- * Club domestic league appearances and goals as of 1 May 2024 ‡ National team caps and goals as of 25 April 2016

Manuel Anton Konrad (born 14 April 1988) is a German professional footballer who played as a midfielder for FV Biberach.

== Career ==
Konrad began his career with SC Freiburg, whom he had joined from Ulm in 2003. Konrad made his debut for Freiburg on 25 August 2006, in a 1–1 draw with SpVgg Unterhaching. He moved to SpVgg Unterhaching on loan on 27 January 2009 and later, on 8 June 2009, signed permanently with the club. After one season, he signed for FSV Frankfurt.

== Career statistics ==
As of match played on 6 October 2020

Appearances and goals by club, season and competition
Club	Season	League			Cup		Other		Total	
Club	Season	Division	Apps	Goals	Apps	Goals	Apps	Goals	Apps	Goals
SC Freiburg II	2008–09	Regionalliga	13	2	—		—		13	2
SpVgg Unterhaching (loan)	2008–09	3. Liga	17	1	0	0	0	0	17	1
SpVgg Unterhaching	2009–10	3. Liga	34	3	1	0	0	0	35	3
SpVgg Unterhaching II	2008–09	Regionalliga	2	0	—		—		2	0
FSV Frankfurt	2010–11	2. Bundesliga	21	0	1	0	0	0	22	0
FSV Frankfurt	2011–12	2. Bundesliga	14	0	0	0	0	0	14	0
FSV Frankfurt	2012–13	2. Bundesliga	33	2	2	0	0	0	35	2
FSV Frankfurt	2013–14	2. Bundesliga	28	0	2	0	0	0	30	0
FSV Frankfurt	2014–15	2. Bundesliga	31	0	2	0	0	0	33	0
FSV Frankfurt	2015–16	2. Bundesliga	28	1	2	0	0	0	30	1
FSV Frankfurt	Total		155	3	9	0	0	0	164	3
FSV Frankfurt II	2010–11	Regionalliga	11	0	—		—		11	0
FSV Frankfurt II	2011–12	Regionalliga	5	0	—		—		5	0
FSV Frankfurt II	Total		16	0	0	0	0	0	16	0
Dynamo Dresden	2016–17	2. Bundesliga	15	1	1	0	0	0	16	1
Dynamo Dresden	2017–18	2. Bundesliga	26	3	2	0	0	0	20	3
Dynamo Dresden	Total		41	4	3	0	0	0	44	4
KFC Uerdingen 05	2018–19	3. Liga	32	0	0	0	0	0	0	0
KFC Uerdingen 05	2019–20	3. Liga	27	1	0	0	0	0	0	0
KFC Uerdingen 05	Total		59	1	0	0	0	0	59	1
Selangor	2021	Malaysia Super League	13	0	1	0	0	0	14	0
Career total			337	14	13	0	0	0	350	14
