= Danial Asri =

Malaysian footballer (born 2000)

Personal information
- Full name: Ahmad Danial bin Ahmad Asri
- Date of birth: 1 April 2000 (age 26)
- Place of birth: Rawang, Selangor, Malaysia
- Height: 1.77 m (5 ft 10 in)
- Position: Forward

Team information
- Current team: DPMM FC
- Number: 9

Youth career
- 2015–2017: SMK Dato' Harun
- 2017–2019: Selangor III & IV

Senior career*
Years	Team	Apps	(Gls)
2019–2020	Selangor II	11	(7)
2020–2025	Selangor	46	(5)
2025–2026	Kuching City	20	(5)
2026–	DPMM	6	(0)

International career^{‡}
2022	Malaysia U23	8	(1)
- * Club domestic league appearances and goals as of 20 November 2026 ‡ National team caps and goals as of 25 June 2026

Ahmad Danial bin Ahmad Asri (born 1 April 2000) is a Malaysian professional footballer who plays as a midfielder or forward for Bruneian club DPMM FC of the Malaysia Super League.

== Club career ==
=== Early years ===
Danial was in the Selangor youth team at the age of 18–19, having arrived from local side SMK Dato' Harun which he represented at the SuperMokh Cup in 2017. He was a key player and captain of Selangor III and made a total of 42 appearances from 2018 to 2019.

=== Selangor ===
Danial began his professional career when he was called up by Selangor II team head coach Michael Feichtenbeiner after scoring two goals during a friendly match against Geylang International. He played in all of the matches for the 2020 season and was the local top scorer in the Premier League with seven goals. He made his debut with the senior team in the 2020 Malaysia Cup against Melaka United.

In December 2020, Selangor confirmed that Danial would be definitely promoted to senior's first team for the 2021 season.

=== Kuching City ===
Danial transferred to fellow MSL side Kuching City in June 2025 under Aidil Sharin Sahak. The team from Sarawak had a successful 2025–26 campaign, finishing in second place in the league as well as a Malaysia Cup final appearance, whereby Danial contributed immensely with eight goals in 32 outings.

=== DPMM ===
In June 2026, DPMM FC who are an invited team in the Malaysia Super League announced the signing of Danial for the 2026–27 season.

== International career ==
After impressive displays for Selangor in the league, Danial was called up by Malaysia under-23 coach Brad Maloney in preparation for the 2021 SEA Games football tournament to commence in May 2022, where he subsequently made the final 20-man squad after debuting for the team in a 2–0 friendly win over the Philippines. He was ever-present in the group stage of the competition, scoring against Thailand in the first game. He was unable to exert his influence in the knockout stage, as Malaysia were denied a podium finish after losing the bronze medal match to Indonesia, after a semi-final defeat to eventual gold medalists Vietnam.

The same team was retained for the 2022 AFC U-23 Asian Cup hosted by Uzbekistan in the following June. Danial was a late substitute in a 4–1 loss to South Korea in the first match. He only lasted the first half in the following 0–3 defeat to Thailand, which ended their progression in the tournament.

== Career statistics ==
=== Club ===
As of 23 October 2026

Appearances and goals by club, season and competition
Club	Season	League			Cup (Note: Includes Malaysia FA Cup)		League Cup (Note: Includes Malaysia Cup)		Continental		Other		Total	
Club	Season	Division	Apps	Goals	Apps	Goals	Apps	Goals	Apps	Goals	Apps	Goals	Apps	Goals
Selangor II	2020	Malaysia Premier League	11	7	0	0	—						11	7
Selangor	2020	Malaysia Super League	0	0	0	0	1	0	—				1	0
Selangor	2021	Malaysia Super League	21	3	0	0	0	0	—				21	3
Selangor	2022	Malaysia Super League	10	1	1	0	6	0	—				17	1
Selangor	2023	Malaysia Super League	10	1	0	0	1	0	—				11	1
Selangor	2024–25	Malaysia Super League	5	0	0	0	2	0	1 (Note: Appearances in AFC Champions League Two)	0	4 (Note: Appearance(s) in MFL Challenge Cup)	1	11	1
Selangor	Total		46	5	1	0	10	0	1	0	4	1	62	6
Kuching City	2025–26	Malaysia Super League	20	5	5	3	7	0	—				32	8
DPMM	2026–27	Malaysia Super League	5	0	5	1	0	0	—				10	1
Career total			82	17	11	4	17	0	1	0	4	1	115	22

== Honours ==
=== Club ===
Selangor

- Malaysia Cup runner-up: 2022

Kuching City

- Malaysia Super League runner-up: 2025–26
- Malaysia Cup runner-up: 2025–26

=== Individual ===
- Malaysia Premier League Local Top Scorer : 2020
