= Michael Ijezie =

Nigerian football player (born 1987)

Personal information
- Full name: Michael Chukwubunna Ijezie
- Date of birth: 6 September 1987 (age 39)
- Place of birth: Nigeria
- Height: 1.83 m (6 ft 0 in)
- Position: Forward

Youth career
- 2000: Enugu Rangers

Senior career*
Years	Team	Apps	(Gls)
2012–2014	Betaria		
2014	Felcra		
2015–2016	SPA	11	(6)
2016	Southern Myanmar	12	(7)
2017–2018	MIFA	13	(10)
2018–2019	UKM	28	(21)
2021	Kuching City	14	(6)
2022–2023	Al-Ettifaq Club (Bahrain)		
2023–2024	Kuching City	7	(4)
2025	Pokhara Thunders	3	(0)
- * Club domestic league appearances and goals

Michael Chukwubunna Ijezie (born 6 September 1987) is a Nigeria professional footballer who last plays as a forward.
