= Uche Agba =

Nigerian footballer (born 1986)

Personal information
- Full name: Uche Agba
- Date of birth: 24 June 1986 (age 40)
- Place of birth: Lagos, Nigeria
- Height: 1.78 m (5 ft 10 in)
- Position: Forward

Senior career*
Years	Team	Apps	(Gls)
2008–2010	Heartland	59	(36)
2010–2011	CS Sfaxien	26	(3)
2011–2012	Al-Qadsiah	24	(9)
2012–2013	Al-Muharraq	?	(16)
2013–2015	Dibba Al-Hisn	?	(?)
2015	Kaduna United	?	(?)
2016–2017	Al-Hidd	13	(11)
2017–2018	Al-Najma	10	(18)
2018–2019	Al-Riffa	6	(8)
2019-2020	PDRM	7	(9)
2020-2021	Melaka United	11	(5)
2021–2023	Sarawak United	26	(19)
2023–2024	PDRM	19	(5)
- * Club domestic league appearances and goals

Uche Agba (born 24 June 1986) is a Nigerian professional footballer who plays as a forward

== Honours ==
Al Hidd

- Bahraini FA Cup: 2016–17

Al-Riffa

- Bahraini Premier League: 2019
- Bahraini Super Cup: 2019

Sarawak United

- Malaysia Premier League runner-up: 2021

PDRM

- MFL Challenge Cup: 2023

Individual

- Bahraini Premier League top scorer: 2017-18
- MFL Challenge Cup top scorer: 2023
