= Razlan Joffri Ali =

Malaysian footballer and referee

Razlan Joffri
- Full name: Razlan Joffri bin Ali
- Born: 6 January 1985 (age 41); Terengganu

Domestic
Years	League	Role
2016–	Malaysia Super League	Referee

International
Years	League	Role
2018–	FIFA listed	Referee

Razla Joffri bin Ali (born 6 January 1985) is a Malaysian professional football referee.

Razlan is a former football player who played as a right back for Sime Darby in 2011 and PKNS.

== Career ==
On 4 November 2017, Razlan was selected as a referee for the 2017 Malaysia Cup Final in Shah Alam Stadium, Shah Alam, between Kedah and Johor Darul Ta'zim.
