= Sarawak United FC =

Malaysian football club

Sarawak United
- Full name: Sarawak United Football Club
- Nickname: The Hornbills
- Short name: SUFC
- Founded: 1974; 52 years ago (as Malaysian Malay's FA); 2016; 10 years ago (as Selangor Malays FA); 2018; 8 years ago (as Selangor United); 2020; 6 years ago (as Sarawak United)
- Dissolved: 2024
- Ground: Sarawak State Stadium
- Capacity: 26,000
- League: Malaysia M3 League
- 2023: 12 of 14 (dissolved)
- Website: sarawakunitedfc.com

Sarawak United Football Club was a professional football club based in Sarawak, Malaysia. The club didn't compete in the 2023 Malaysia Super League due to a failed licensing appeal.

== History ==
Founded in 1974 as the Malaysian Malay's Football Association football team, the club changed its name to Selangor Malays' Football Association football team when competing in the 2017 Malaysia FAM League season. They were rebranded again as Selangor United for the 2018 Malaysia FAM Cup season. Unfortunately, Selangor United did not last long in the game as the team faced financial difficulties. In 2019, the club was bought over by the FAS and the new owners subsequently rebranded the club as Sarawak United.

With FAS buying and rebranding the team, the move was a win-win situation for FAS, because thanks to the move, FAS has made sure that a team representing the Malaysian state of Sarawak is playing in the 2020 Malaysia Premier League. All that happened after the main football team run by FAS to compete in the Malaysia Premier League at the time, known as the Sarawak FA state football team, were relegated to the Malaysian third-tier division, the Malaysia M3 League in 2019. In 2020, the Malaysia Premier League however saw the participation of two Sarawak-based football clubs with Kuching City being promoted to the Malaysia Premier League that year.

=== 2016 season ===
- Malaysia Malays' Football Association entered the Malaysian football league competition in 2016 season.
- The team is managed by the Selangor Malays' Football Association, an affiliate of Malaysia Malays' Football Association. The team finished 2016 season in seventh place.

=== 2017 season ===
- Starting from 2017 season, the team has been rebranded to Selangor Malays' Football Association as an effort to bring in local area support. The club has managed advanced to second round of 2017 Malaysia FA Cup after defeating SAMB.
- However, they were knocked out from the tournament after a defeat of 0–3 against Perak.

=== 2018 season ===
- They were re-branded again as Selangor United in 2018. The club succeeded in winning the semi-final in the knock-out stage of the 2018 Malaysia FAM Cup, and were promoted to Premier League as finalists, even though they were beaten in the final 0–2 by Terengganu City.

=== 2019 season ===
- The club made their debut into professional football for the 2019 Malaysia Premier League, the second-tier professional football league in Malaysia. They finished 9th in the league by the end of the season.
- In the December 2019, the club were bought over by the Football Association of Sarawak (FAS) after the Selangor Malays Football Association stop receiving fund from the Selangor State government and were forced to get rid of the team.

== New era ==
=== 2020 season ===
The 2020 season was Sarawak United's 1st year in their history and also first season in the Malaysia Premier League. Along with the league, the club also participated in the Malaysia FA Cup but was cancelled due to COVID-19 pandemic. On 13 March, it was announced that the 2020 Malaysia Premier League would be suspended indefinitely, due to the ongoing COVID-19 pandemic. On 1 May, it was announced that the league would resume in September depending on the situation at the time. Due to time constraints, the home-and-away format for the Premier League had been scrapped. Teams played each other only once. Sarawak United FC finished their 2020 Malaysia Premier League campaign with 3 Wins, 2 Draws and 6 Losses after 11 matches.

=== 2021 season ===
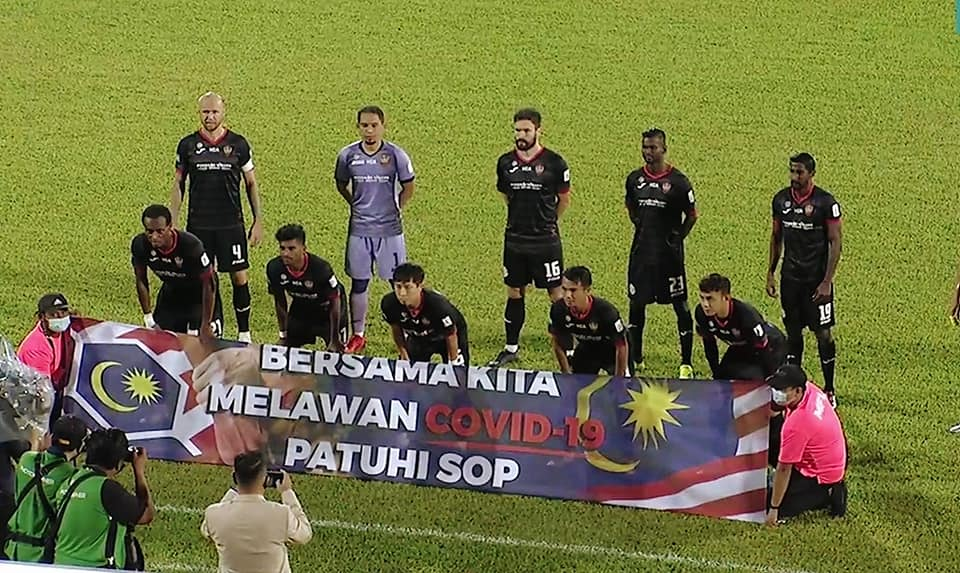
Sarawak United FC Current 2021 Season Photo by Facebook Page Sarawak Team

For the 2021 season the club was strengthened with several well -known players. Among them are Malaysian National player, Norshahrul Idlan and Australian National player, Taylor Regan. The club seen as strong in every position and was selected as the team of choice to be a Champion of 2021 Malaysia Premier League. Sarawak United started the 2021 Malaysia Premier League campaign with a 2–0 victory over Kelantan United. For the 2021 season, Sarawak United team is also the most difficult team to beat by the opposing team. Sarawak United's fort is controlled by an experienced Goalkeeper, Sharbinee Allawee which is not easy to beat. Imported striker from Nigeria, Uche Agba, on the other hand, emerged as the top scorer for Sarawak United.

After 17 matches in the Malaysian Premier League 2021 have been played, Sarawak United was officially promoted and eligible to play in the highest tier of the Malaysian Football League, the 2022 Malaysia Super League.

=== 2022 season ===
Sarawak United was rejected from Malaysia Super League and relegated to M3 League from 2023 season due to failed licensing appeal.

== Crest and colours ==
Since the club's foundation in 1974, they had five main crests. The first colours of the club crest were green and red. For the 2021 Malaysia Premier League season, the team's outfield players wore black shirts, red shorts and red socks for the club's home matches.

=== Crest ===
Sarawak United used a crest which was seen as a modified version of the Football Association of Sarawak (FAS) crest for the 2020 Malaysia Premier League season. However, in 2021, Sarawak United changed the team's crest which was more reflective of the ethnic characteristics of Sarawak, although the Golden Hornbill remained the symbol of choice.

Malaysia Malays' Football Association crest; first logo (1946–2016)

Selangor Malays' Football Association crest; (2017)

Selangor United crest; (2018-2019)

Sarawak United crest; (2020)

Sarawak United crest; (2021-2023)

== Kit manufacturers ==
Year(s)	Manufacturer
2016	Line 7
2017	Kappa
2018	SkyHawk
2019	Sportrevo
2020–2022	Joma
2023–2024	AL Sports

== Stadium and locations ==
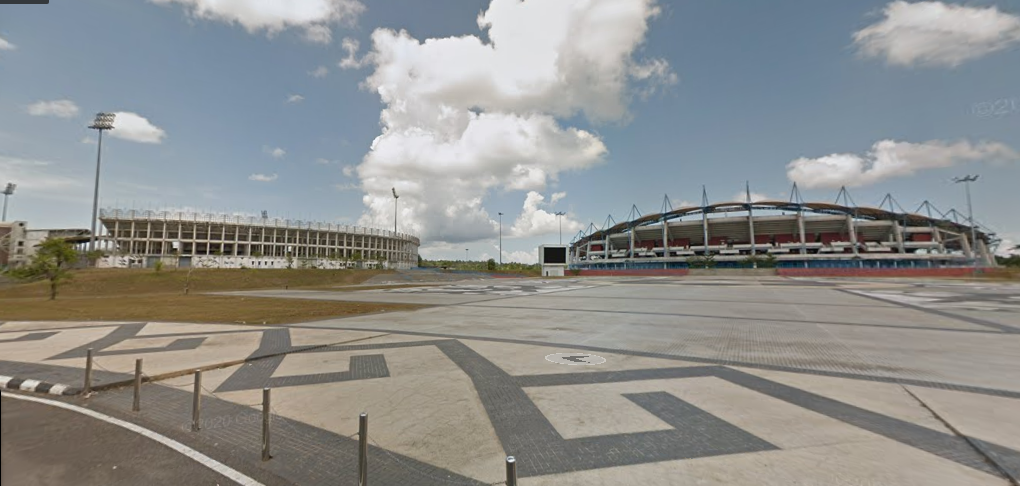
Sarawak Stadium and Sarawak State Stadium are located adjacent to each other.

Sarawak State Stadium is located in an area of 5 hectares in Petra Jaya. Officially opened in 1989, It was the largest stadium in Malaysia at that point of time. The stadium can accommodate 26,000 spectators at a time. It has been used to host Sarawak FA home matches.

== Season-by-season records (since 2020) ==
- Pld = Played, W = Won, D = Drawn, L = Lost, F = Goals for, A = Goals against, D = Goal difference, Pts= Points, Pos = Position

1st or Champions 2nd or Runner-up 3rd place Promotion Relegation

Season	League										Cup				Asia	
Season	Division	Pld	W	D	L	F	A	D	Pts	Pos	Charity	Malaysia	Challenge	FA	Competition	Result
2020	Malaysia Premier League	11	3	2	6	14	16	-2	11	10th	–	Cancelled	–	Cancelled	–	
2021	Malaysia Premier League	20	11	5	4	37	14	23	38	2nd	–	Quarter-final	–	Cancelled	–	
2022	Malaysia Super League	22	5	2	15	19	50	-31	17	11th	–	Round of 16	–	Second round	–	–
2023	M3 League	24	1	1	22	18	80	-62	4	12th	–	–	–	–	–	–

=== Top scorers (since 2020) ===
Season	Player	Goals
2020	(Liberia) Patrick Wleh	5
2021	(Nigeria) Uche Agba	19
2022	(Cambodia) Boris Kok	4

== Foreign players (since 2020) ==
Season	Player 1	Player 2	Player 3	Player 4	Player 5
2020 Malaysia Premier League	(Brazil) Demerson	(Argentina) Gabriel Guerra	(Liberia) Patrick Wleh	(Iran) Milad Zanidpour	(Argentina) Nicolás Marotta
2021 Malaysia Premier League	(Australia) Taylor Regan	(Brazil) Sandro	(South Korea) Lee Chang-hoon	(Nigeria) Uche Agba	
2022 Malaysia Super League	(Argentina) Gonzalo Soto	(Togo) Francis Koné	(South Korea) Lee Chang-hoon	(Nigeria) Uche Agba	(Cambodia) Boris Kok

== Coaches (since 2020) ==
Name	From	To	Honours
(Spain) Juan Carlos Magro	December 2019	March 2020	—
(Malaysia) E. Elavarasan	March 2020	February 2022	2021 Malaysia Premier League runner-up
(Malaysia) B. Sathianathan (Interim)	March 2022	July 2022	—
(Malaysia) S. Balachandran	July 2022	May 2023	—
(Malaysia) Ahmad Nurfaizal Patrick Abdullah	May 2023	Dec 2023	—

== Honours ==
=== Domestic ===
- Malaysia FAM League

(silver) Runners-up (1): 2018

- Malaysia Premier League

(silver) Runners-up (1): 2021
