= 2024–25 Sri Pahang FC season =

Sri Pahang
2024–25 season
- President: Tengku Abdul Rahman
- CEO: Suffian Awang
- Head coach: Fandi Ahmad
- Stadium: Darul Makmur Stadium
- Malaysia Super League: 8th
- Malaysia FA Cup: Round of 16
- Malaysia Cup: Runners-up
- Top goalscorer: League: Kpah Sherman (8); All: Kpah Sherman (11)
Home colours	Away colours	Third colours

The 2024–25 season was Sri Pahang's 21st season in the Malaysia Super League since its inception in 2004. The club participated in the Malaysia FA Cup and the Malaysia Cup.

On 17 January 2023, Fandi Ahmad has been appointed as club's new head coach.

== Coaching staff ==
Position	Name	Nationality
Team manager	Dollah Salleh	Malaysia
Head coach	Fandi Ahmad	Singapore
Assistant head coach	Ahmad Yusof	Malaysia
Assistant coach	Ahmad Shaharuddin Rosdi	Malaysia
Assistant coach	Jalaluddin Jaafar	Malaysia
Goalkeeper coach	Omar Salim	Malaysia
Fitness coach	Azmi Ibrahim	Malaysia
Team doctor	Shah Rezal Sujit Baskaran Abdullah	Malaysia
Physiotherapist	Adam Zuhairy Zafri	Malaysia
Masseur	Suhaimi Ramli	Malaysia
Masseur	Muhammad Hazeem Mustafar Kamal	Malaysia

== Players ==
=== First-team squad ===
Note: Flags indicate national team as defined under FIFA eligibility rules; some limited exceptions apply. Players may hold more than one non-FIFA nationality.

No.	Pos.	Nation	Player
1	GK	MAS	Zarif Irfan
3	DF	MAS	Adam Nor Azlin
4	MF	MAS	Asnan Ahmad
5	DF	SRB	Aleksandar Cvetković
6	DF	MAS	Syazwan Andik
7	DF	MAS	Aiman Asyraf
9	FW	LBR	Kpah Sherman
11	FW	UKR	Mykola Ahapov
12	MF	MAS	Baqiuddin Shamsudin
13	DF	MAS	Ashar Al Aafiz
15	DF	ARG	Stefano Brundo
16	FW	MAS	Ezequiel Agüero
18	GK	MAS	Azfar Arif

No.	Pos.	Nation	Player
20	MF	MAS	Azam Azih
23	DF	MAS	Azwan Aripin
25	GK	MAS	Wan Mohd Syazmin (on loan from Kedah Darul Aman)
26	MF	MAS	T. Saravanan
27	DF	MAS	Fadhli Shas (captain)
29	DF	MAS	Azrif Nasrulhaq
30	DF	MAS	Ibrahim Manusi
33	MF	MAS	Saiful Jamaluddin
35	FW	MAS	Syaahir Saiful
38	MF	MAS	Adam Alif
44	DF	MAS	Hasnul Zaim
55	MF	MAS	David Rowley
88	MF	ARG	Manuel Hidalgo (on loan from Johor Darul Ta'zim)

=== From Under-23s ===
Note: Flags indicate national team as defined under FIFA eligibility rules; some limited exceptions apply. Players may hold more than one non-FIFA nationality.

No.	Pos.	Nation	Player
—	MF	MAS	Nasyrullah Zaki
—	MF	MAS	Adam Malique

No.	Pos.	Nation	Player
—	FW	MAS	Aqil Arazi
—	FW	MAS	Lokman Bah Din

== Competitions ==
=== Overview ===
Competition	First match	Last match	Starting round	Final position	Record							
Competition	First match	Last match	Starting round	Final position	Pld	W	D	L	GF	GA	GD	Win %
Malaysia Super League	11 May 2024	19 April 2025	Matchday 1	8th	24	7	8	9	35	39	−4	29.17
Malaysia FA Cup	14 June 2024		Round of 16	Round of 16	1	0	1	0	1	1	+0	0.00
Malaysia Cup	23 November 2024	26 April 2025	Round of 16	Runners-up	7	3	3	1	11	9	+2	42.86
Total					32	10	12	10	47	49	−2	31.25

Last updated: 26 April 2025
Source: Competitions

== Statistics ==
=== Appearances and goals ===
No.	Pos	Nat	Player	Total		Malaysia Super League		Malaysia FA Cup		Malaysia Cup	
No.	Pos	Nat	Player	Apps	Goals	Apps	Goals	Apps	Goals	Apps	Goals
Goalkeepers
1	GK	(Malaysia) MAS	Zarif Irfan	24	0	17	0	1	0	6	0
18	GK	(Malaysia) MAS	Azfar Arif	9	0	7	0	0	0	1+1	0
40	GK	(Malaysia) MAS	Hanif Faizal	0	0	0	0	0	0	0	0
41	GK	(Malaysia) MAS	Amir Haikal	0	0	0	0	0	0	0	0
Defenders
3	DF	(Malaysia) MAS	Adam Nor Azlin	28	3	17+3	3	0+1	0	7	0
5	DF	(Serbia) SRB	Aleksandar Cvetković	26	1	17+1	1	1	0	7	0
6	DF	(Malaysia) MAS	Syazwan Andik	21	1	10+4	1	0+1	0	6	0
13	DF	(Malaysia) MAS	Ashar Al Aafiz	4	0	3+1	0	0	0	0	0
15	DF	(Argentina) ARG	Stefano Brundo	24	7	15+4	7	1	0	2+2	0
23	DF	(Malaysia) MAS	Azwan Aripin	24	0	14+4	0	1	0	0+5	0
27	DF	(Malaysia) MAS	Fadhli Shas	22	0	12+4	0	1	0	0+5	0
29	DF	(Malaysia) MAS	Azrif Nasrulhaq	28	0	16+4	0	1	0	7	0
30	DF	(Malaysia) MAS	Ibrahim Manusi	24	0	9+9	0	0	0	5+1	0
42	DF	(Malaysia) MAS	Danish Azami	0	0	0	0	0	0	0	0
44	DF	(Malaysia) MAS	Hasnul Zaim	7	0	4+3	0	0	0	0	0
Midfielders
4	MF	(Malaysia) MAS	Asnan Ahmad	9	0	4+3	0	0	0	0+2	0
7	MF	(Malaysia) MAS	Sean Selvaraj	20	1	5+8	0	0	0	5+2	1
12	MF	(Malaysia) MAS	Baqiuddin Shamsudin	28	0	9+12	0	0+1	0	3+3	0
20	MF	(Malaysia) MAS	Azam Azih	28	0	15+7	0	1	0	0+5	0
26	MF	(Malaysia) MAS	T. Saravanan	14	3	4+9	2	0	0	1	1
33	MF	(Malaysia) MAS	Saiful Jamaluddin	23	0	10+6	0	0+1	0	6	0
35	MF	(Malaysia) MAS	Syaahir Saiful	3	0	0+2	0	0	0	0+1	0
39	MF	(Malaysia) MAS	Amirul Haikal	0	0	0	0	0	0	0	0
46	MF	(Malaysia) MAS	Nasyrullah Zaki	0	0	0	0	0	0	0	0
Forwards
9	FW	(Liberia) LBR	Kpah Sherman	25	11	18	8	1	0	6	3
11	FW	(Ukraine) UKR	Mykola Ahapov	31	4	17+6	3	0+1	1	6+1	0
16	FW	(Malaysia) MAS	Ezequiel Agüero	25	5	16+2	4	0+1	0	4+2	1
34	FW	(Malaysia) MAS	Lokman Bah Din	0	0	0	0	0	0	0	0
38	FW	(Malaysia) MAS	Adam Alif	1	0	0	0	1	0	0	0
55	FW	(Malaysia) MAS	David Rowley	21	1	4+15	1	0	0	0+2	0
88	FW	(Argentina) ARG	Manuel Hidalgo	24	7	17+1	3	1	0	5	4
Players transferred/loaned out during the season
10	MF	(Uzbekistan) UZB	Kuvondik Ruziev	4	0	3	0	1	0	0	0

Last updated: 18 June 2025
Source: FAM-CMS
