= 2023 Sri Pahang FC season =

Sri Pahang
2023 season
- President: Tengku Abdul Rahman
- CEO: Suffian Awang
- Head coach: Fandi Ahmad
- Stadium: Darul Makmur Stadium
- Malaysia Super League: 5th
- Malaysia FA Cup: Second round
- Malaysia Cup: Quarter-finals
- Top goalscorer: League: Kpah Sherman (12); All: Kpah Sherman (14)
- Average home league attendance: 4,621
| Home colours | Away colours | Third colours |

The 2023 season was Sri Pahang's 20th season in the Malaysia Super League since its inception in 2004. The club will also participate in the Malaysia FA Cup and Malaysia Cup.

On 17 January 2023, Fandi Ahmad has been appointed as club's new head coach.

== Coaching staff ==
| Position | Name | Nationality |
|---|---|---|
| Team manager | Dollah Salleh | Malaysia |
| Head coach | Fandi Ahmad | Singapore |
| Assistant head coach | Ahmad Yusof | Malaysia |
| Assistant coach | Ahmad Shaharuddin Rosdi | Malaysia |
| Goalkeeper coach | Ab Samad Mat Salleh | Malaysia |
| Fitness coach | Mohamad Hafiz Tajuddin | Malaysia |
| Team doctor | Shah Rezal Sujit Baskaran Abdullah | Malaysia |
| Physiotherapist | Adam Zuhairy Zafri | Malaysia |
| Masseur | Jalaluddin Jaafar | Malaysia |
| Masseur | Mohd Riduan Amin | Malaysia |
| Masseur | Muhammad Hazeem Mustafar Kamal | Malaysia |

== Players ==
=== First-team squad ===
Note: Flags indicate national team as defined under FIFA eligibility rules; some limited exceptions apply. Players may hold more than one non-FIFA nationality.

| No. | Pos. | Nation | Player |
|---|---|---|---|
| 1 | GK | MAS | Zarif Irfan |
| 5 | DF | AUS | Michael Glassock |
| 6 | MF | PHI | Kevin Ingreso |
| 7 | FW | BRA | Lucas Silva |
| 9 | FW | LBR | Kpah Sherman |
| 10 | FW | MAS | Malik Ariff |
| 11 | FW | MAS | Shamie Iszuan |
| 12 | MF | MAS | Baqiuddin Shamsudin |
| 13 | DF | MAS | Ashar Al Aafiz |
| 15 | DF | ARG | Stefano Brundo |
| 16 | FW | MAS | Ezequiel Agüero (captain) |
| 17 | MF | MAS | Zuhair Aizat |
| 19 | MF | MAS | Sharul Nizam |
| 20 | MF | MAS | Azam Azih (vice-captain) |

| No. | Pos. | Nation | Player |
|---|---|---|---|
| 21 | DF | MAS | Syazwan Andik (on loan from Johor Darul Ta'zim) |
| 23 | DF | MAS | Azwan Aripin |
| 24 | GK | MAS | Izham Tarmizi (on loan from Johor Darul Ta'zim) |
| 25 | GK | MAS | Wan Syazmin |
| 27 | DF | MAS | Fadhli Shas (vice-captain) |
| 29 | DF | MAS | Azrif Nasrulhaq (on loan from Johor Darul Ta'zim) |
| 30 | FW | MAS | Ibrahim Manusi |
| 31 | DF | UZB | Sherzod Fayziev |
| 35 | FW | MAS | Syaahir Saiful |
| 36 | MF | MAS | Saiful Jamaluddin |
| 55 | MF | MAS | David Rowley |
| 58 | DF | MAS | Muslim Ahmad |
| 61 | DF | MAS | Nicholas Swirad |

== Competitions ==
=== Malaysia Super League ===
| Pos | Team | Pld | W | D | L | GF | GA | GD | Pts | Qualification or relegation |
|---|---|---|---|---|---|---|---|---|---|---|
| 3 | Sabah | 26 | 17 | 3 | 6 | 64 | 33 | +31 | 54 | |
| 4 | Kedah Darul Aman | 26 | 17 | 2 | 7 | 52 | 29 | +23 | 53 | |
| 5 | Sri Pahang | 26 | 13 | 6 | 7 | 44 | 33 | +11 | 45 | |
| 6 | Terengganu | 26 | 11 | 7 | 8 | 45 | 34 | +11 | 40 | Qualification for the AFF Shopee Cup group stage (Note: Qualified as the 2023 Malaysia Cup & 2023 Malaysia FA Cup runner-up.) |
| 7 | Kuala Lumpur City | 26 | 10 | 8 | 8 | 44 | 39 | +5 | 38 | Qualification for the AFF Shopee Cup group stage |

Source: MFL
Rules for classification: 1) Points; 2) Goal difference; 3) Number of goals scored.
Notes:

| 26 February 2023 1 | Negeri Sembilan | 1–1 | Sri Pahang | Paroi |
| 21:00 MYT | Casagrande 21', (yellow card) 22' | Report | Malik 48'; Fayziev (yellow card) 86' | Stadium: Tuanku Abdul Rahman Stadium; Attendance: 6,329; Referee: Fitri Maskon |

| 2 March 2023 2 | Sri Pahang | 4–1 | Kelantan | Kuantan |
| 21:00 MYT | Sherman 12'; Ingreso 38'; Agüero 43'; Brundo 45+1'; Azwan (yellow card) 73' | Report | Rontini (yellow card) 69'; Cifu 90+5' | Stadium: Darul Makmur Stadium; Attendance: 6,040; Referee: Razlan Joffri Ali |

| 5 March 2023 3 | Selangor | 1–1 | Sri Pahang | Petaling Jaya |
| 17:30 MYT | Gan 88'; Al-Arab (yellow card) 90+3' | Report | Fadhli (yellow card) 14'; Baqiuddin (yellow card) 38'; Azwan (yellow card) 55'; Brundo 74'; Sherman (yellow card) 90+3'; Zarif (yellow card) 90+4'; Agüero (yellow card) 90+5' | Stadium: Petaling Jaya Stadium; Attendance: 8,504; Referee: Fitri Maskon |

| 12 March 2023 4 | Sri Pahang | 1–1 | Sabah | Kuantan |
| 20:15 MYT | Sherman 26'; Brundo (yellow card) 83' | Report | Ting 14'; Irfan (yellow card) 45+1' | Stadium: Darul Makmur Stadium; Attendance: 10,027; Referee: Noor Azriel Baharudin |

| 16 March 2023 5 | Perak | 0–3 | Sri Pahang | Ipoh |
| 21:00 MYT | Sherman 13'; Brundo 37'; Agüero (yellow card) 56'; Ingreso (yellow card) 65'; Zuhair 74' | Report | Nasro (red card) 39' | Stadium: Perak Stadium; Attendance: 5,855; Referee: Razlan Joffri Ali |

| 1 April 2023 6 | Sri Pahang | 1–1 | Kedah Darul Aman | Kuantan |
| 22:00 UTC+08:00 | Brundo 62' (pen.) | Report | Ariff (yellow card) 61'; Hidalgo (yellow card) 72'; Balotelli 90+2' | Stadium: Darul Makmur Stadium; Attendance: 7,296; Referee: Razlan Joffri Ali |

| 5 April 2023 7 | PDRM | 1–2 | Sri Pahang | Petaling Jaya |
| 22:00 UTC+08:00 | Amir (yellow card) 5'; Okwuosa 76' | Report | Baqiuddin 18'; Sherman 22', (yellow card) 47'; Azam (yellow card) 36' | Stadium: Petaling Jaya Stadium; Attendance: 471; Referee: Tuan Mohd Yaasin Tuan Mohd Hanafiah |

| 10 April 2023 8 | Sri Pahang | 1–0 | Kelantan United | Kuantan |
| 22:00 UTC+08:00 | Brundo 90+3' | Report | Sharvin (yellow card) 73' | Stadium: Darul Makmur Stadium; Attendance: 2,811; Referee: Mohd Fusser Mad Sallih |

| 18 April 2023 9 | Kuching City | 0–1 | Sri Pahang | Kuching |
| 21:15 UTC+08:00 | | Report | Azam 57' | Stadium: Sarawak Stadium; Attendance: 275; Referee: Mohd Fusser Mad Sallih |

| 28 April 2023 10 | Terengganu | 1–2 | Sri Pahang | Kuala Terengganu |
| 21:00 UTC+08:00 | Mamut 39' | Report | Sherman 30'; Azam 68' | Stadium: Sultan Mizan Zainal Abidin Stadium; Attendance: 10,520; Referee: Mohd Nafeez Abd Wahab |

| 24 May 2023 11 | Johor Darul Ta'zim | 2–0 | Sri Pahang | Iskandar Puteri |
| 20:15 UTC+08:00 | Bérgson 45+1'; Forestieri 74' | Report | | Stadium: Sultan Ibrahim Stadium; Attendance: 14,684; Referee: Suhaizi Shukri |

=== Malaysia FA Cup ===
| 8 March 2023 First round | Perak | 1–2 | Sri Pahang | Ipoh |
| 20:15 UTC+8 | Hafizal (yellow card) 22'; Fadhil (yellow card) 27' (yellow-red card) 67'; Obiozor 34'; Haziq (yellow card) 62' | Report | Agüero (yellow card) 40'; Malik 82'; Brundo 90+4' (pen.) | Stadium: Perak Stadium; Attendance: 4,219; Referee: Mohamad Kamil Zakaria Ismail |

| 15 April 2023 Second round | Selangor | 4–0 | Sri Pahang | Petaling Jaya |
| 22:00 UTC+8 | Mukhairi 41', 59'; Faisal 67'; Gan 72' | Report | | Stadium: Petaling Jaya Stadium; Attendance: 5,106; Referee: Ahmad Zuhadi Dzulkifli |

== Player statistics ==
=== Appearances and goals ===
As of 16 June 2025

| No. | Pos | Player | League | | FA Cup | | Malaysia Cup | | Total | |
| No. | Pos | Player | Apps | Goals | Apps | Goals | Apps | Goals | Apps | Goals |
|---|---|---|---|---|---|---|---|---|---|---|
| 1 | GK | (Malaysia) Zarif Irfan | 12+2 | 0 | 0 | 0 | 1 | 0 | 15 | 0 |
| 5 | DF | (Australia) Michael Glassock | 17+6 | 0 | 1 | 0 | 1 | 0 | 25 | 0 |
| 8 | MF | (Uzbekistan) Kuvondik Ruziev | 11 | 1 | 0 | 0 | 4 | 0 | 15 | 1 |
| 9 | FW | (Liberia) Kpah Sherman | 24 | 12 | 2 | 0 | 4 | 2 | 30 | 14 |
| 10 | FW | (Malaysia) Malik Ariff | 2+10 | 1 | 0+2 | 1 | 0 | 0 | 14 | 2 |
| 11 | MF | (Malaysia) Shamie Iszuan | 2+8 | 0 | 0+1 | 0 | 0+2 | 0 | 13 | 0 |
| 12 | MF | (Malaysia) Baqiuddin Shamsudin | 20+4 | 1 | 2 | 0 | 3+1 | 1 | 30 | 2 |
| 13 | DF | (Malaysia) Ashar Al Aafiz | 3+5 | 0 | 0 | 0 | 1 | 0 | 9 | 0 |
| 14 | MF | (South Korea) Lee Jung-geun | 0 | 0 | 1 | 0 | 0 | 0 | 1 | 0 |
| 15 | DF | (Argentina) Stefano Brundo | 24 | 10 | 2 | 1 | 4 | 1 | 30 | 12 |
| 16 | FW | (Malaysia) Ezequiel Agüero | 12+2 | 5 | 1 | 0 | 3+1 | 0 | 19 | 5 |
| 17 | MF | (Malaysia) Zuhair Aizat | 6+8 | 1 | 0+2 | 0 | 0 | 0 | 16 | 1 |
| 19 | MF | (Malaysia) Sharul Nizam | 0+8 | 0 | 0 | 0 | 1+1 | 0 | 10 | 0 |
| 20 | MF | (Malaysia) Azam Azih | 19+1 | 2 | 2 | 0 | 4 | 0 | 26 | 2 |
| 21 | DF | (Malaysia) Syazwan Andik | 13+8 | 1 | 2 | 0 | 2+1 | 1 | 26 | 2 |
| 22 | FW | (Brazil) Rafael Silva | 0 | 0 | 0 | 0 | 1+1 | 0 | 2 | 0 |
| 23 | DF | (Malaysia) Azwan Aripin | 20+4 | 0 | 1 | 0 | 2+1 | 0 | 28 | 0 |
| 24 | GK | (Malaysia) Izham Tarmizi | 14 | 0 | 2 | 0 | 3 | 0 | 19 | 0 |
| 27 | DF | (Malaysia) Fadhli Shas | 20 | 2 | 1 | 0 | 3 | 0 | 24 | 2 |
| 29 | DF | (Malaysia) Azrif Nasrulhaq | 23 | 1 | 2 | 0 | 3+1 | 0 | 29 | 1 |
| 30 | DF | (Malaysia) Ibrahim Manusi | 0+1 | 0 | 0 | 0 | 0 | 0 | 1 | 0 |
| 31 | DF | (Uzbekistan) Sherzod Fayziev | 2+11 | 0 | 1 | 0 | 0+1 | 0 | 15 | 0 |
| 35 | FW | (Malaysia) Syaahir Saiful | 0+1 | 0 | 0 | 0 | 0 | 0 | 1 | 0 |
| 36 | MF | (Malaysia) Saiful Jamaluddin | 2+1 | 0 | 0 | 0 | 0 | 0 | 3 | 0 |
| 55 | MF | (Malaysia) David Rowley | 6+14 | 2 | 0+1 | 0 | 1+2 | 1 | 24 | 3 |
| 61 | DF | (Malaysia) Nicholas Swirad | 8+4 | 0 | 1+1 | 0 | 1 | 0 | 15 | 0 |
Players who left the club during the 2023 season
| 6 | MF | (Philippines) Kevin Ingreso | 15+3 | 2 | 1 | 0 | 2+1 | 0 | 22 | 2 |
| 7 | FW | (Brazil) Lucas Silva | 5 | 0 | 0+1 | 0 | 0+2 | 0 | 8 | 0 |

== Transfers ==
=== Players in ===
| Player | From | Fee |
|---|---|---|
| (Liberia) Kpah Sherman | (Malaysia) Terengganu | Free |
| (Australia) Michael Glassock | (Australia) Sydney Olympic | Free |
| (Malaysia) Lokman Bah Din | (Malaysia) Projek FAM-MSN | Free |
| (Malaysia) Adam Malique | (Malaysia) Kelantan | Free |
| (Brazil) Lucas Silva | (Malaysia) Penang | Free |
| (Argentina) Stefano Brundo | (Argentina) Estudiantes BA | Free |
| (Malaysia) Fadhli Shas | (Malaysia) Johor Darul Ta'zim | Free |
| (Malaysia) Shamie Iszuan | (Malaysia) Sarawak United | Free |
| (South Korea) Lee Jung-geun | | |

=== Players out ===
| Player | To | Fee |
|---|---|---|
| (Colombia) Steven Rodríguez | (Colombia) Independiente Medellín | Loan return |
| (Malaysia) Mior Dani | (Malaysia) Kelantan | Loan return |
| (Mali) Mamadou Samassa | Free Agent | Free |
| (Malaysia) Nur Izzat Che Awang | (Malaysia) Penang | Free |
| (Malaysia) Hasnul Zaim | (Malaysia) Perak | Free |
| (Malaysia) Fandi Othman | (Malaysia) Kelantan United | Free |
| (Malaysia) Sean Giannelli | (Malaysia) Kuala Lumpur City | Free |
| (Malaysia) Hafiz Ramdan | (Malaysia) Negeri Sembilan | Free |
| (Malaysia) Lee Tuck | (Malaysia) Kedah Darul Aman | Free |
| (Argentina) Manuel Hidalgo | (Malaysia) Kedah Darul Aman | Free |
| (Jordan) Mahmoud Za'tara | (Jordan) Al-Jazeera | Free |
| (Malaysia) Daniel Wafiuddin | Free Agent | Free |
| (Malaysia) Shahrul Aizad | Free Agent | Free |

=== Loans in ===
| Player | From | Fee |
|---|---|---|
| (Malaysia) Izham Tarmizi | (Malaysia) Johor Darul Ta'zim | Loan |
| (Malaysia) Syazwan Andik | (Malaysia) Johor Darul Ta'zim | Loan |
| (Malaysia) Azrif Nasrulhaq | (Malaysia) Johor Darul Ta'zim | Loan |

=== Loans out ===
| Player | To | Fee |
