= 2022 Sri Pahang FC season =

Sri Pahang
2022 season
- President: Tengku Abdul Rahman ibni Almarhum Sultan Haji Ahmad Shah Al-Musta'in Billah
- CEO: Suffian Awang
- Head coach: Christophe Gamel (until 21 July 2022); Dollah Salleh (since 21 July 2022)
- Stadium: Darul Makmur Stadium
- Malaysia Super League: 7th
- Malaysia FA Cup: Quarter-finals
- Top goalscorer: League: Steven Rodríguez (9); All: Steven Rodríguez (11)
Home colours	Away colours	Third colours

The 2022 season was Sri Pahang FC's 19th season in the Malaysia Super League since its inception in 2004. In addition to the domestic league, Sri Pahang also participated in the Malaysia FA Cup and the Malaysia Cup.

== Players ==
=== First-team ===
Note: Flags indicate national team as defined under FIFA eligibility rules; some limited exceptions apply. Players may hold more than one non-FIFA nationality.

No.	Pos.	Nation	Player
1	GK	MAS	Zarif Irfan
2	DF	MAS	Wan Amirzafran
4	DF	MAS	Nicholas Swirad
6	MF	PHI	Kevin Ingreso
7	MF	MAS	Lee Tuck
9	FW	COL	Steven Rodríguez
10	FW	MAS	Malik Ariff
11	MF	MAS	Shahrul Aizad
12	MF	MAS	Baqiuddin Shamsudin
13	DF	MAS	Ashar Al Aafiz
14	FW	MAS	Sean Giannelli
16	FW	MAS	Ezequiel Agüero
17	MF	MAS	Zuhair Aizat
18	GK	MAS	Daniel Wafiuddin
19	MF	MAS	Sharul Nizam Nadzir
20	MF	MAS	Azam Azih

No.	Pos.	Nation	Player
22	GK	MAS	Wan Syazmin Ruzaimi
23	FW	MAS	Nur Izzat Che Awang
24	DF	MAS	Muslim Ahmad
27	DF	MAS	Azwan Aripin
29	MF	MAS	Mior Dani (on loan from Kelantan)
30	GK	MLI	Mamadou Samassa
31	DF	UZB	Sherzod Fayziev
33	DF	MAS	Saiful Jamaluddin
34	MF	MAS	Nasyrullah Zaki
35	MF	MAS	Syaahir Saiful
36	DF	MAS	Hasnul Zaim
36	FW	MAS	Amin Che Jusoh
38	DF	MAS	Ibrahim Manusi
55	DF	MAS	David Rowley
62	DF	MAS	Faizal Arif
71	DF	MAS	Fandi Othman
88	FW	ARG	Manuel Hidalgo

== Statistics ==
=== Appearances and goals ===
As of 28 January 2023

No.	Pos	Nat	Player	Total		League		FA Cup		Malaysia Cup	
No.	Pos	Nat	Player	Apps	Goals	Apps	Goals	Apps	Goals	Apps	Goals
Goalkeepers:
1	GK	(Malaysia) MAS	Zarif Irfan	1	0	1	0	0	0	0	0
18	GK	(Malaysia) MAS	Daniel Wafiuddin	1	0	0+1	0	0	0	0	0
22	GK	(Malaysia) MAS	Wan Syazmin	0	0	0	0	0	0	0	0
30	GK	(Mali) MLI	Mamadou Samassa	25	0	21	0	2	0	2	0
Defenders:
4	DF	(Malaysia) MAS	Nicholas Swirad	24	0	20	0	1+1	0	2	0
13	DF	(Malaysia) MAS	Ashar Al Aafiz	23	0	14+6	0	2	0	1	0
19	DF	(Malaysia) MAS	Sharul Nizam Nadzir	18	2	4+12	1	0+1	1	0+1	0
24	DF	(Malaysia) MAS	Muslim Ahmad	17	0	13+2	0	1	0	1	0
27	DF	(Malaysia) MAS	Azwan Aripin	23	1	19+1	0	2	1	1	0
31	DF	(Uzbekistan) UZB	Sherzod Fayziev	16	0	13	0	1	0	2	0
36	DF	(Malaysia) MAS	Hasnul Zaim	7	0	1+4	0	1	0	0+1	0
37	DF	(Malaysia) MAS	Amin Che Jusoh	0	0	0	0	0	0	0	0
38	DF	(Malaysia) MAS	Ibrahim Manusi	3	0	0+3	0	0	0	0	0
62	DF	(Malaysia) MAS	Faizal Arif	2	0	0+1	0	0+1	0	0	0
71	DF	(Malaysia) MAS	Fandi Othman	9	0	3+2	0	0+2	0	1+1	0
Midfielders:
6	MF	(Philippines) PHI	Kevin Ingreso	16	0	12+1	0	1	0	1+1	0
7	MF	(Malaysia) MAS	Lee Tuck	2	1	0	0	0	0	1+1	1
11	MF	(Malaysia) MAS	Shahrul Aizad	5	0	0+5	0	0	0	0	0
12	MF	(Malaysia) MAS	Baqiuddin Shamsudin	20	0	13+3	0	2	0	2	0
17	MF	(Malaysia) MAS	Zuhair Aizat	14	1	1+12	1	0+1	0	0	0
20	MF	(Malaysia) MAS	Azam Azih	24	3	20	3	2	0	2	0
29	MF	(Malaysia) MAS	Mior Dani	12	0	5+6	0	0	0	0+1	0
33	MF	(Malaysia) MAS	Saiful Jamaluddin	7	1	2+3	1	0+2	0	0	0
34	MF	(Malaysia) MAS	Nasyrullah Zaki	1	0	0+1	0	0	0	0	0
55	MF	(Malaysia) MAS	David Rowley	22	6	14+4	6	1+1	0	1+1	0
Forwards:
9	FW	(Colombia) COL	Steven Rodríguez	16	12	13	9	1	1	2	2
10	FW	(Malaysia) MAS	Malik Ariff	17	3	12+3	3	2	0	0	0
14	FW	(Malaysia) MAS	Sean Giannelli	12	1	4+8	1	0	0	0	0
16	FW	(Malaysia) MAS	Ezequiel Agüero	2	0	0	0	0	0	1+1	0
23	FW	(Malaysia) MAS	Nur Izzat Che Awang	5	0	0+5	0	0	0	0	0
35	FW	(Malaysia) MAS	Syaahir Saiful	9	0	2+6	0	0+1	0	0	0
88	FW	(Argentina) ARG	Manuel Hidalgo	24	7	20	7	2	0	2	0
Players who left during the season but made an appearance
8	FW	(Laos) LAO	Billy Ketkeophomphone	4	0	4	0	0	0	0	0
9	FW	(Jordan) JOR	Mahmoud Za'tara	7	3	6	1	1	2	0	0
91	DF	(France) FRA	Johan Martial	6	0	5+1	0	0	0	0	0

- Source: Sri Pahang
