= 2025–26 Kelantan The Real Warriors F.C. season =

Kelantan The Real Warriors
2025–26 season
- President: Annuar Musa
- CEO: Irwan Rizal
- Head coach: E. Elavarasan (until 15 October); Akmal Rizal (until 11 March)
- Stadium: Sultan Muhammad IV Stadium
- Malaysia Super League: TBD
- Malaysia FA Cup: Quarter-finals
- Malaysia Cup: Round of 16
- MFL Challenge Cup: Semi-finals
- Top goalscorer: League: Ifedayo Olusegun (4); All: Ifedayo Olusegun (6)
- Biggest win: 3–1 v Kuala Lumpur City 3–1 (H) (18 August 2025, Malaysia FA Cup)
- Biggest defeat: 0–4 v Kuching City 0–4 (A) (9 August 2025, Malaysia Super League)
Home colours	Away colours	Third colours

The 2025–26 season is the tenth season in the history of Kelantan The Real Warriors, and the club's third consecutive season in Malaysia Super League. In addition to the domestic league, the team will participate in the Malaysia FA Cup and the Malaysia Cup.

== Coaching staff ==
Position	Name	Nationality
Head coach	E. Elavarasan	Malaysia
Assistant head coach	Muamer Salibašić	Bosnia and Herzegovina
Goalkeeping coach	Khairul Nizam Mohd Taib	Malaysia
Fitness coach	Kamarul Dinis Kamarudin	Malaysia
Team doctors	Ahmad Baihaqi Abd Rahman	Malaysia
Team doctors	Muhammad Hafiz Kamaruzaman	Malaysia
Team doctors	Ahmad Waqiuddin Rajab	Malaysia
Team doctors	Nabil Aiman	Malaysia
Physiotherapist	Amir Fadzlan	Malaysia
Kitmen	Shamsudin Deraman	Malaysia
Kitmen	Zairul Fitree Ishak	Malaysia
Kitmen	Shahrul Ridzuan Samsuddin	Malaysia

== Squad ==
As of 23 August 2025

Note: Flags indicate national team as has been defined under FIFA eligibility rules. Players may hold more than one non-FIFA nationality.

Squad no.	Name	Nationality	Position(s)	Date of birth (age)	Signed in	Previous club
Goalkeepers
13	Damyan Damyanov	(Bulgaria) (Note: Registered as an International quota player.)	GK	29 June 2000 (age 25)	2025	(Bulgaria) Sportist Svoge
18	Azfar Arif	(Malaysia)	GK	21 April 1999 (age 27)	2025	(Malaysia) Sri Pahang
33	Fikri Che Soh	(Malaysia)	GK	1 February 1992 (age 34)	2024	(Malaysia) Kedah Darul Aman
Defenders
2	Simen Lyngbø	(Philippines) (Note: Registered as an ASEAN quota player.) (Norway)	RB	18 February 1998 (age 28)	2025	(Thailand) Nongbua Pitchaya
5	Alexandre Yeoulé	(Ivory Coast) (Note: Registered as an International quota player.)	CB	23 December 1995 (age 30)	2025	(Iraq) Naft Missan
11	Wan Amirul Afiq	(Malaysia)	RB / CB	18 July 1992 (age 33)	2025	(Malaysia) Kedah Darul Aman
15	Nik Umar	(Malaysia)	CB	15 June 2001 (age 24)	2025	(Malaysia) Perak
23	Azwan Aripin	(Malaysia)	LB / LWB	21 April 1996 (age 30)	2025	(Malaysia) Sri Pahang
45	Faris Shah	(Malaysia)	CB / RB	17 April 1995 (age 31)	2025	(Malaysia) PT Athletic
50	Rakesh Munusamy	(Malaysia)	CB / RB	29 June 2001 (age 24)	2025	(Malaysia) Bunga Raya
66	Yusuf Sesay	(Sierra Leone) (Note: Registered as an International quota player.)	CB	11 November 2002 (age 23)	2025	(Sierra Leone) Freetown City
Midfielders
4	Sebastian Avanzini	(Italy) (Note: Registered as an International quota player.) (Denmark)	DM	1 April 1995 (age 31)	2025	Unattached
8	Albert Kang	(Canada) (Note: Registered as an International quota player.)	CM	29 June 2001 (age 24)	2025	(Croatia) HNK Tomislav
10	Habib Haroon	(Bahrain) (Note: Registered as an Asia quota player.)	DM / CM	5 October 2000 (age 25)	2025	Bahrain
14	Azam Azih (VC)	(Malaysia)	CM	3 January 1995 (age 31)	2025	(Malaysia) Sri Pahang
17	Syafik Ismail	(Malaysia)	LW / RW	1 March 2000 (age 26)	2025	(Malaysia) Terengganu
20	Danial Haqim	(Malaysia)	CM	29 August 1998 (age 27)	2025	(Malaysia) Sabah
21	Khairul Izuan	(Malaysia)	SS	9 March 1991 (age 35)	2025	Unattached
25	Syahir Rashid	(Malaysia)	AM / CM	31 January 2001 (age 25)	2024	Youth system
27	Saifu Izamander	(Sweden) (Note: Registered as an International quota player.)	CM	28 July 2003 (age 22)	2025	(Sweden) Storskogens SK
29	Farris Izdiham	(Malaysia)	LW / CM	27 July 2001 (age 24)	2025	(Malaysia) Perak
30	Hein Htet Aung	(Myanmar) (Note: Registered as an ASEAN quota player.)	RW	5 October 2001 (age 24)	2025	(Myanmar) Yangon United
88	Asraff Aliffuddin	(Malaysia)	AM / CF	13 June 1999 (age 26)	2021	(Malaysia) Selangor II
Forwards
7	Prince Aggreh	(Bahrain) (Note: Registered as an Asia quota player.) (Nigeria)	LW / CF	30 September 1996 (age 29)	2025	(Kuwait) Khaitan
12	Ifedayo Olusegun (C)	(Bahrain) (Note: Registered as an Asia quota player.) (Nigeria)	CF	14 January 1991 (age 35)	2025	(Malaysia) PDRM
19	Syaahir Saiful	(Malaysia)	CF	30 June 2003 (age 22)	2025	(Malaysia) Sri Pahang
24	Abdul Sesay	(Sierra Leone) (Note: Registered as an International quota player.)	CF	24 April 2004 (age 22)	2025	(Sierra Leone) Kallon
26	T. Saravanan	(Malaysia)	LW / RW	26 February 2001 (age 25)	2025	(Malaysia) Sri Pahang
36	Noel Mbo	(England) (Note: Registered as an International quota player.) (Republic of the Congo)	CF	14 March 1999 (age 27)	2025	(Vietnam) Cong An Ho Chi Minh City
70	Sean Selvaraj	(Malaysia)	RW / LW	11 April 1996 (age 30)	2025	(Malaysia) Sri Pahang

== Transfers ==
=== In ===
No.	Pos.	Player	Transferred from	Date	Source
8	MF	(Canada) Albert Kang	(Bosnia and Herzegovina) HNK Tomislav	1 July 2025	
14	MF	(Malaysia) Azam Azih	Sri Pahang	1 July 2025	
18	GK	(Malaysia) Azfar Arif	Sri Pahang	3 July 2025	
15	DF	(Malaysia) Nik Umar	Perak	3 July 2025	
23	DF	(Malaysia) Azwan Aripin	Sri Pahang	8 July 2025	
13	GK	(Bulgaria) Damyan Damyanov	(Bulgaria) Sportist Svoge	9 July 2025	
26	FW	(Malaysia) T. Saravanan	Sri Pahang	9 July 2025	
17	MF	(Malaysia) Syafik Ismail	Terengganu	11 July 2025	
19	FW	(Malaysia) Syaahir Saiful	Sri Pahang	12 July 2025	
20	MF	(Malaysia) Danial Haqim	Sabah	15 July 2025	
45	DF	(Malaysia) Faris Shah	Putrajaya Antlers	15 July 2025	
	FW	(Malaysia) Khairul Izuan	Unattached	15 July 2025	
5	DF	(Ivory Coast) Alexandre Yeoulé	(Iraq) Naft Maysan	16 July 2025	
7	FW	(Nigeria) Prince Aggreh	(Kuwait) Khaitan	16 July 2025	
2	DF	(Philippines) Simen Lyngbø	(Thailand) Nongbua Pitchaya	1 August 2025	
10	MF	(Bahrain) Habib Haroon	Bahrain	1 August 2025	
70	FW	(Malaysia) Sean Selvaraj	Sri Pahang	1 August 2025	
11	DF	(Malaysia) Wan Amirul Afiq	Kedah Darul Aman	2 August 2025	
12	FW	(Nigeria) Ifedayo Olusegun	PDRM	2 August 2025	
50	DF	(Malaysia) Rakesh Munusamy	Bunga Raya	2 August 2025	
	FW	(Sierra Leone) Abdul Sesay	(Sierra Leone) Kallon	2 August 2025	
	DF	(Sierra Leone) Yusuf Sesay	(Sierra Leone) Freetown City	2 August 2025	
4	MF	(Italy) Sebastian Avanzini	Unattached	31 August 2025	
30	MF	(Myanmar) Hein Htet Aung	(Myanmar) Yangon United	31 August 2025	
36	FW	(England) Noel Mbo	(Vietnam) Cong An Ho Chi Minh City	31 August 2025	

=== Out ===
No.	Pos.	Player	Transferred to	Date	Source
1	GK	(Malaysia) Alfaiz Zula'amin	Kedah	8 July 2025	
11	MF	(Malaysia) Afzal Akbar	Kedah	8 July 2025	
2	DF	(Malaysia) Arip Amiruddin	Unattached	8 July 2025	
4	DF	(Malaysia) Ghaffar Abdul Rahman	UM-Damansara United	8 July 2025	
5	DF	(Malaysia) Muhammad Faudzi	Kelantan Red Warrior	8 July 2025	
8	MF	(Malaysia) Syed Sobri	Unattached	8 July 2025	
12	MF	(Malaysia) Amirul Shafik Che Soh	Kelantan WTS	8 July 2025	
13	FW	(Malaysia) Fazli Ghazali	Kelantan Red Warrior	8 July 2025	
14	DF	(Malaysia) Nasrol Amri	Perak	8 July 2025	
15	MF	(Malaysia) Zuasyraf Zulkiefle	Kelantan Red Warrior	8 July 2025	
16	MF	(Malaysia) Jasmir Mehat	Kedah	8 July 2025	
17	MF	(Malaysia) Fazrul Amir	Kuala Lumpur City	8 July 2025	
19	MF	(Malaysia) Irwan Syazmin	Unattached	8 July 2025	
20	MF	(Malaysia) Faizal Talib	Unattached	8 July 2025	
21	DF	(Malaysia) Umeir Aznan	Bunga Raya	8 July 2025	
28	MF	(Malaysia) Mior Dani	Immigration	8 July 2025	
29	DF	(Malaysia) Hafizal Mohamad	Unattached	8 July 2025	
30	GK	(Malaysia) Muhaimin Mohamad	Kedah	8 July 2025	
31	MF	(Malaysia) Haziq Subri	Unattached	8 July 2025	
33	FW	(Malaysia) Adam Danial	Unattached	8 July 2025	
38	FW	(Malaysia) Aqil Hussni	Unattached	8 July 2025	
40	DF	(Malaysia) Fahrurrozi Suhirman	Machan	8 July 2025	
44	MF	(Malaysia) Adam Basyir	Kelantan WTS	8 July 2025	
50	MF	(United States) Johan Muliadi	Unattached	8 July 2025	
61	MF	(Malaysia) Hakimi Abdullah	Negeri Sembilan	8 July 2025	
66	MF	(Malaysia) Fakhrul Che Ramli	Kelantan WTS	8 July 2025	
72	MF	(Malaysia) Danial Aiman	Unattached	8 July 2025	
78	DF	(Malaysia) Aqif Asyraaf	Unattached	8 July 2025	
79	MF	(Malaysia) Amjad Huzeny	Kelantan WTS	8 July 2025	
88	MF	(Malaysia) Muhaimin Izuddin	Kelantan Red Warrior	8 July 2025	

== Competitions ==
=== Overview ===
Competition	First match	Last match	Starting round	Final position	Record							
Competition	First match	Last match	Starting round	Final position	Pld	W	D	L	GF	GA	GD	Win %
Malaysia Super League	9 August 2025	16 May 2026	Matchday 1	12th	24	4	3	17	17	63	−46	16.67
Malaysia FA Cup	18 August 2025	29 October 2025	Round of 16	Quarter-finals	4	1	0	3	5	7	−2	25.00
Malaysia Cup	19 January 2026	23 January 2026	Round of 16	Round of 16	2	0	0	2	1	5	−4	0.00
MFL Challenge Cup	7 February 2026	11 March 2026	Quarter-finals	Semi-finals	4	2	0	2	6	8	−2	50.00
Total					34	7	3	24	29	83	−54	20.59

Source: Competitions

=== Malaysia Super League ===
9 August 2025 1	Kuching City	4–0	Kelantan The Real Warriors	Kuching
20:15 MYT (UTC+8)		Report		Stadium: Sarawak State Stadium; Attendance: 3,141; Referee: Zamzaidi Katimin

12 August 2025 2	Kelantan The Real Warriors	1–1	Immigration	Kota Bharu
21:00 MYT (UTC+8)	Olusegun 79' (pen.)	Report		Stadium: Sultan Muhammad IV Stadium; Attendance: 1,015; Referee: Muhammad Usaid Jamal

23 August 2025 3	Sabah	0–0	Kelantan The Real Warriors	Kota Kinabalu
20:15 MYT (UTC+8)		Report		Stadium: Likas Stadium; Attendance: 6,438; Referee: Ahmad Zuhadi Dzulkifli

30 August 2025 4	Penang	0–1	Kelantan The Real Warriors	Penang
21:00 MYT (UTC+8)		Report	Olusegun 28'	Stadium: City Stadium; Attendance: 2,013; Referee: Muhammad Shukor Zulkiflee

20 September 2025 5	PDRM	3–1	Kelantan The Real Warriors	Selayang
21:00 MYT (UTC+8)		Report	Olusegun 45' (pen.)	Stadium: Selayang Stadium; Attendance: 1,957; Referee: S. Logeswaran

26 September 2025 6	DPMM (Brunei)	2–1	Kelantan The Real Warriors	Bandar Seri Begawan
20:15 MYT (UTC+8)	Jordan 53'	Report	Olusegun 38'; Azam 42'	Stadium: Hassanal Bolkiah National Stadium; Attendance: 2,800; Referee: Muhamad Afiq Naim

3 October 2025 7	Terengganu	4–1	Kelantan The Real Warriors	Kuala Terengganu
21:00 MYT (UTC+8)		Report	Saravanan 51'	Stadium: Sultan Mizan Zainal Abidin Stadium; Attendance: 2,957; Referee: Mohammad Zamzaidi Katimin

24 October 2025 8	Kelantan The Real Warriors	2–1	Melaka	Kota Bharu
21:00 MYT (UTC+8)	Ozor 37' (pen.); Danial 89'	Report	Douglas 90+12'	Stadium: Sultan Muhammad IV Stadium; Attendance: 1,180; Referee: Mohamad Kamil Zakaria Ismail

1 November 2025 9	Kuala Lumpur City	v	Kelantan The Real Warriors	Cheras
20:15 MYT (UTC+8)				Stadium: Kuala Lumpur Stadium

Pos	Team	Pld	W	D	L	GF	GA	GD	Pts	Qualification or relegation
9	Sabah	24	5	8	11	29	44	−15	23	
10	DPMM	24	6	5	13	30	57	−27	23	Ineligible for AFC competition spots
11	Melaka	24	4	7	13	18	45	−27	19	
12	Kelantan The Real Warriors	24	4	3	17	17	63	−46	15	
13	PDRM	24	2	5	17	17	79	−62	11	

Updated to match(es) played on 17 May 2026. Source: Malaysian Football League
Rules for classification: 1) Points; 2) Goal difference; 3) Number of goals scored.

=== Malaysia FA Cup ===
Round of 16

18 August 2025 First leg	Kelantan The Real Warriors	3–1	Kuala Lumpur City	Kota Bharu
21:00 MYT (UTC+8)	Olusegun 5', 17'; Selvaraj 64'	Report	Syamer 87'	Stadium: Sultan Muhammad IV Stadium; Attendance: 1,420; Referee: Mohamad Faizudin Ismail

14 September 2025 Second leg	Kuala Lumpur City	1–0 (2–3 agg.)	Kelantan The Real Warriors	Cheras
20:15 MYT (UTC+8)		Report		Stadium: Kuala Lumpur Stadium; Attendance: 1,871; Referee: Muhammad Khairulsyahmi Ahmad Khalidi

Quarter-finals

17 October 2025 First leg	Kelantan The Real Warriors	1–2	Sabah	Kota Bharu
21:00 MYT (UTC+8)	A. Sesay 18'	Report		Stadium: Sultan Muhammad IV Stadium; Referee: Muhammad Usaid Jamal

29 October 2025 Second leg	Sabah	v	Kelantan The Real Warriors	Kota Kinabalu
				Stadium: Likas Stadium

=== Malaysia Cup ===
v

== Squad statistics ==
=== Appearances and goals ===
No.	Pos	Nat	Player	Total		Malaysia Super League		Malaysia FA Cup		Malaysia Cup	
No.	Pos	Nat	Player	Apps	Goals	Apps	Goals	Apps	Goals	Apps	Goals
Goalkeepers
13	GK	(Bulgaria) BUL	Damyan Damyanov	10	0	5+2	0	3	0	0	0
18	GK	(Malaysia) MAS	Azfar Arif	3	0	3	0	0	0	0	0
Defenders
2	DF	(Philippines) PHI	Simen Lyngbø	11	0	7+1	0	3	0	0	0
5	DF	(Ivory Coast) CIV	Alexandre Yeoulé	10	0	8	0	2	0	0	0
11	DF	(Malaysia) MAS	Wan Amirul Afiq	7	0	5	0	2	0	0	0
23	DF	(Malaysia) MAS	Azwan Aripin	11	0	8	0	3	0	0	0
45	DF	(Malaysia) MAS	Faris Shah Rosli	6	0	0+4	0	0+2	0	0	0
50	DF	(Malaysia) MAS	Rakesh Munusamy	3	0	2	0	1	0	0	0
Midfielders
4	MF	(Italy) ITA	Sebastian Avanzini	6	0	2+2	0	1+1	0	0	0
8	MF	(Canada) CAN	Albert Kang	10	0	6+1	0	3	0	0	0
10	MF	(Bahrain) BHR	Habib Haroon	8	0	6	0	2	0	0	0
14	MF	(Malaysia) MAS	Azam Azih	11	1	7+1	1	3	0	0	0
17	MF	(Malaysia) MAS	Syafik Ismail	2	0	1+1	0	0	0	0	0
20	MF	(Malaysia) MAS	Danial Haqim	6	1	0+3	1	0+3	0	0	0
21	MF	(Malaysia) MAS	Khairul Izuan	1	0	0+1	0	0	0	0	0
25	MF	(Malaysia) MAS	Syahir Rashid	6	0	1+4	0	0+1	0	0	0
29	MF	(Malaysia) MAS	Farris Izdiham	10	0	3+5	0	1+1	0	0	0
30	MF	(Myanmar) MYA	Hein Htet Aung	7	0	4+1	0	1+1	0	0	0
70	MF	(Malaysia) MAS	Sean Selvaraj	8	1	5+1	0	2	1	0	0
88	MF	(Malaysia) MAS	Asraff Aliffuddin	3	0	1+1	0	1	0	0	0
Forwards
7	FW	(Nigeria) NGA	Prince Aggreh	1	0	1	0	0	0	0	0
12	FW	(Nigeria) NGA	Ifedayo Olusegun	9	6	7	4	2	2	0	0
19	FW	(Malaysia) MAS	Syaahir Saiful	2	0	1	0	0+1	0	0	0
24	FW	(Sierra Leone) SLE	Abdul Sesay	6	1	1+3	0	1+1	1	0	0
26	FW	(Malaysia) MAS	T. Saravanan	10	1	4+3	1	2+1	0	0	0
Players transferred/loaned out during the season

Last updated: 24 October 2025
Source: Competitions
