= 2020 UiTM FC season =

UiTM FC
2020 season
- Owner: Universiti Teknologi MARA
- President: Prof. Dr. Azizan Abdullah
- Head coach: Frank Bernhardt
- Stadium: UiTM Stadium
- Malaysia Super League: 6th
- Malaysia FA Cup: Cancelled
- Malaysia Cup: Cancelled
- Top goalscorer: League: Gustavo (6); All: Gustavo (6)

The 2020 season was UiTM FC's first competitive season in the highest tier of Malaysian football after got promoted from 2019 Malaysia Premier League.

== Competitions ==
=== Malaysia Super League ===
==== League table ====
| Pos | Team | Pld | W | D | L | GF | GA | GD | Pts |
|---|---|---|---|---|---|---|---|---|---|
| 4 | Perak | 11 | 5 | 3 | 3 | 21 | 19 | +2 | 18 |
| 5 | Selangor | 11 | 4 | 5 | 2 | 26 | 19 | +7 | 17 |
| 6 | UiTM | 11 | 5 | 2 | 4 | 17 | 15 | +2 | 17 |
| 7 | Petaling Jaya City | 11 | 3 | 5 | 3 | 17 | 16 | +1 | 14 |
| 8 | Pahang | 11 | 4 | 2 | 5 | 18 | 18 | 0 | 14 |

Source: Malaysian Football League
Rules for classification: 1) Points; 2) Goal difference; 3) Number of goals scored.

== Statistics ==
As of match played 8 November 2020

=== Appearances and goals ===
| No. | Pos | Nat | Player | Total | | League | | FA Cup | |
| No. | Pos | Nat | Player | Apps | Goals | Apps | Goals | Apps | Goals |
Goalkeepers
| 1 | GK | (Malaysia) MAS | Azam Jais | 0 | 0 | 0 | 0 | 0 | 0 |
| 20 | GK | (Malaysia) MAS | Haziq Aris | 4 | 0 | 4 | 0 | 0 | 0 |
| 24 | GK | (Malaysia) MAS | Azfar Arif | 9 | 0 | 8+1 | 0 | 0 | 0 |
Defenders
| 2 | DF | (Malaysia) MAS | Amirul Ashraf | 0 | 0 | 0 | 0 | 0 | 0 |
| 12 | DF | (Malaysia) MAS | Afif Asyraf | 10 | 0 | 10 | 0 | 0 | 0 |
| 15 | DF | (Malaysia) MAS | Danish Haziq | 7 | 0 | 3+4 | 0 | 0 | 0 |
| 21 | DF | (Malaysia) MAS | Faizal Arif | 7 | 0 | 7 | 0 | 0 | 0 |
| 23 | DF | (Malaysia) MAS | Nashran Elias | 2 | 0 | 0+2 | 0 | 0 | 0 |
| 28 | DF | (Malaysia) MAS | Ariff Ar-Rasyid | 10 | 0 | 6+4 | 0 | 0 | 0 |
| 44 | DF | (Malaysia) MAS | Arham Khussyairi | 0 | 0 | 0 | 0 | 0 | 0 |
| 68 | DF | (Malaysia) MAS | Khuzaimi Piee | 5 | 0 | 5 | 0 | 0 | 0 |
| 99 | DF | (France) FRA | Victor Nirennold | 10 | 2 | 10 | 2 | 0 | 0 |
Midfielders
| 8 | MF | (Malaysia) MAS | Fariduddin Zainal | 0 | 0 | 0 | 0 | 0 | 0 |
| 11 | MF | (Malaysia) MAS | Zulkiffli Zakaria | 5 | 1 | 0+5 | 1 | 0 | 0 |
| 13 | MF | (Malaysia) MAS | Asraff Hayqal | 6 | 0 | 5+1 | 0 | 0 | 0 |
| 14 | MF | (Malaysia) MAS | Nuzul Iman | 1 | 0 | 0+1 | 0 | 0 | 0 |
| 16 | MF | (Malaysia) MAS | Shafiq Al-Hafiz | 10 | 0 | 10 | 0 | 0 | 0 |
| 18 | MF | (Malaysia) MAS | Shahrul Igwan | 4 | 0 | 0+4 | 0 | 0 | 0 |
| 19 | MF | (Malaysia) MAS | Saiful Iskandar | 7 | 0 | 1+6 | 0 | 0 | 0 |
| 30 | MF | (Lebanon) LBN | Rabih Ataya | 9 | 2 | 9 | 2 | 0 | 0 |
| 39 | MF | (Malaysia) MAS | Nizarruddin Jazi | 1 | 0 | 0+1 | 0 | 0 | 0 |
| 75 | MF | (France) FRA | Ousmane Fané | 9 | 0 | 9 | 0 | 0 | 0 |
| 88 | MF | (Malaysia) MAS | Nazirul Hasif | 1 | 0 | 1 | 0 | 0 | 0 |
Forwards
| 10 | FW | (Brazil) BRA | Gustavo | 8 | 6 | 7+1 | 6 | 0 | 0 |
| 17 | FW | (Malaysia) MAS | Arif Anwar | 8 | 1 | 8 | 1 | 0 | 0 |
| 25 | FW | (Philippines) PHI | Mark Hartmann | 6 | 1 | 5+1 | 1 | 0 | 0 |
| 66 | FW | (Malaysia) MAS | Rafie Yaacob | 6 | 1 | 4+2 | 1 | 0 | 0 |
Players who left UiTM during the season:
