= Saiful Jamaluddin =

Malaysian footballer

Personal information
- Full name: Mohamad Saiful bin Jamaluddin
- Date of birth: 28 May 2002 (age 24)
- Place of birth: Kuala Lipis, Malaysia
- Height: 1.75 m (5 ft 9 in)
- Position: Defensive midfielder

Team information
- Current team: Terengganu
- Number: 33

Youth career
- 2019: Felda United
- 2020: Negeri Sembilan

Senior career*
Years	Team	Apps	(Gls)
2022–2025	Sri Pahang	24	(1)
2025–	Terengganu	0	(0)

International career^{‡}
2023–	Malaysia U23	6	(0)
- * Club domestic league appearances and goals as of 15 June 2025 ‡ National team caps and goals as of 26 March 2024

Mohamad Saiful bin Jamaluddin (born 28 May 2002) is a Malaysian footballer who plays as a defensive midfielder for Malaysia Super League club Terengganu and the Malaysia U23.

== Club career ==
=== Terengganu ===
On 24 June 2025, Saiful signed a one-year contract with Malaysia Super League club Terengganu.

== International career ==
In September 2023, Saiful was selected with the Malaysia team for the 2023 AFF U-23 Championship organized in Thailand.

== Career statistics ==
=== Club ===
As of match played 18 June 2025

Appearances and goals by club, season and competition
Club	Season	League			Cup		League Cup		Continental		Total	
Club	Season	Division	Apps	Goals	Apps	Goals	Apps	Goals	Apps	Goals	Apps	Goals
Sri Pahang	2022	Malaysia Super League	5	1	2	0	0	0	–		7	1
Sri Pahang	2023	Malaysia Super League	3	0	0	0	0	0	–		3	0
Sri Pahang	2024–25	Malaysia Super League	16	0	1	0	6	0	–		23	0
Sri Pahang	Total		24	1	3	0	6	0	–		33	1
Terengganu	2025–26	Malaysia Super League	0	0	0	0	0	0	–		0	0
Terengganu	Total		0	0	0	0	0	0	–		0	0
Career Total			0	0	0	0	0	0	–	–	0	0
