= Nor Azam Azih =

Malaysian footballer

Azam Azih
Personal information
- Full name: Muhammad Nor Azam bin Abdul Azih
- Date of birth: 3 January 1995 (age 31)
- Place of birth: Maran, Pahang, Malaysia
- Height: 1.68 m (5 ft 6 in)
- Position: Central midfielder

Team information
- Current team: Selangor
- Number: 19

Youth career
- 2013: Pahang U19

Senior career*
Years	Team	Apps	(Gls)
2014	Harimau Muda B	22	(1)
2015–2025	Sri Pahang	169	(9)
2025–2026	Kelantan The Real Warriors	22	(2)
2026–	Selangor	0	(0)

International career^{‡}
2017–2018	Malaysia U23	9	(1)
2017–	Malaysia	24	(0)
Medal record
Malaysia under-23
Sea Games
Silver medal – second place	Sea Games 2017	Football
Men's football
Representing Malaysia
Men's football
King's Cup
Runner-up	2022
- * Club domestic league appearances and goals as of 25 October 2025 ‡ National team caps and goals as of 23 March 2023

Muhammad Nor Azam bin Abdul Azih (born 3 January 1995) is a Malaysian professional footballer who plays as a central midfielder for Malaysia Super League club Selangor and the Malaysia national team. He can operate as a box-to-box midfielder and is known for his creativity, accurate passes, ball control and technique. He is also known as a long range shoot specialist. Azam is also often compared to the legendary Italian footballer, Andrea Pirlo, during the same gameplay.

== Club career ==
=== Pahang ===
Nor Azam was born in Jengka 21, Maran, Pahang an d is ahe fif, during the same gameplay.th of six siblings. He was member of Harimau Muda B that competed in 2014 S.League.

Nor Azam was signed from Harimau Muda B at the start of 2015 season. His first appearances for Pahang was against Johor Darul Ta'zim on 31 January 2015 coming on from a bench in the 85th minute.

He received his breakthrough with Pahang when Azidan Sarudin picked up an injury early in the 2015 season. He took full advantage of it and the more experienced Azidan found himself on the bench once he recovered. Overall he made 24 appearances in all competition for Pahang during his season debut but an anterior cruciate ligament injury in July 2015 ruled him out for the rest of the season.

On 16 March 2023, he made his 200 appearances in all competitions for Pahang in a victory away to Perak. Following withdrawal of Sri Pahang from Malaysian League, Azam decided to leave Sri Pahang at the end of the 2024–25 season, bringing an end to his 10-year association with the club.

=== Kelantan The Real Warriors ===
On 29 July 2025, Azam joined Kelantan The Real Warriors on a free transfer. He made his debut on 9 August 2025 in a league match against Kuching City, which resulted in a 0–4 loss.

=== Selangor ===
On 30 June 2026, Selangor announced the signing of Azam on a permanent deal.

== International career ==
On 27 May 2017, Nelo Vingada called up Nor Azam for the senior team to play in 2019 AFC Asian Cup qualification. During 2017 Southeast Asian Games in Kuala Lumpur, Nor Azam made 5 appearances and scored 1 goal.

== Career statistics ==
=== Club ===
As of 30 June 2026

Appearances and goals by club, season and competition
Club	Season	League			Cup (Note: Appearance in Malaysia FA Cup)		League Cup (Note: Appearance in Singapore Cup, Malaysia Cup)		Continental		Total	
Club	Season	Division	Apps	Goals	Apps	Goals	Apps	Goals	Apps	Goals	Apps	Goals
Harimau Muda B	2014	S.League	22	1	0	0	1	0	—		23	1
Harimau Muda B	Total		22	1	0	0	1	0	—		23	1
Sri Pahang	2015	Malaysia Super League	12	0	6	0	0	0	6 (Note: Appearance in AFC Cup)	0	24	0
Sri Pahang	2016	Malaysia Super League	9	0	0	0	4	0	—		13	0
Sri Pahang	2017	Malaysia Super League	20	0	7	1	7	1	—		34	2
Sri Pahang	2018	Malaysia Super League	20	1	6	1	7	0	—		33	2
Sri Pahang	2019	Malaysia Super League	16	1	5	0	8	1	—		29	2
Sri Pahang	2020	Malaysia Super League	11	0	0	0	1	0	—		12	0
Sri Pahang	2021	Malaysia Super League	19	2	—		6	0	—		25	2
Sri Pahang	2022	Malaysia Super League	20	3	2	0	2	0	—		24	3
Sri Pahang	2023	Malaysia Super League	20	2	1	0			—		21	2
Sri Pahang	2024–25	Malaysia Super League	22	0	1	0	5	0	—		28	0
Sri Pahang	Total		169	9	28	2	40	2	6	0	243	13
Kelantan The Real Warriors	2025–26	Malaysia Super League	22	2	2	0	4	0	—		28	2
Selangor	2026–27	Malaysia Super League	0	0	0	0	0	0	—		0	0
Selangor	Total		22	2	2	0	4	0	—		28	2
Career Total			199	11	31	2	41	2	6	0	277	15

=== International ===
As of 22 September 2022

Appearances and goals by national team and year
National team	Year	Apps	Goals
Malaysia	2017	2	0
Malaysia	2018	1	0
Malaysia	2019	10	0
Malaysia	2021	3	0
Malaysia	2022	5	0
Malaysia	2023	3	0
Total		24	0

=== International goals ===
Malaysia U-23

As of 29 August 2017.

#	Date	Venue	Opponent	Score	Result	Competition
1.	16 August 2017	Shah Alam Stadium, Malaysia	Singapore	2–1	Win	2017 Southeast Asian Games

== Honours ==
=== Club ===
Sri Pahang

- Malaysia FA Cup: 2018, runner-up 2017
- Malaysia Super League : runner-up 2017

=== International ===
Malaysia U-23

- SEA Games: (silver) Silver 2017
