= M. Rakesh =

Malaysian association football player

Rakesh Munusamy
Personal information
- Full name: Rakesh s/o Munusamy
- Date of birth: 29 June 2001 (age 25)
- Place of birth: Port Dickson, Malaysia
- Position: Centre-back

Team information
- Current team: Kelantan The Real Warriors
- Number: 50

Youth career
- 2022: Petaling Jaya City U21

Senior career*
Years	Team	Apps	(Gls)
2023	Kelantan	10	(0)
2024–2025	Terengganu II		
2025	Bunga Raya		
2025–	Kelantan The Real Warriors	2	(0)

International career^{‡}
2023–	Malaysia U23	3	(0)
- * Club domestic league appearances and goals as of 20 September 2025 ‡ National team caps and goals as of 23 April 2023

Rakesh s/o Munusamy (born 29 June 2001) is a Malaysian professional footballer who plays as a centre-back for Malaysia Super League club Kelantan The Real Warriors.

== Club career ==
=== Terengganu II ===
In 2024, Rakesh signed a one-year contract with Terengganu II.

== International career ==
Rakesh was part of 2023 AFF U-23 Championship squads.

== Career statistics ==
=== Club ===
As of match played 20 September 2025

Club	Season	League			Cup		League Cup		Continental		Total	
Club	Season	Division	Apps	Goals	Apps	Goals	Apps	Goals	Apps	Goals	Apps	Goals
Kelantan The Real Warriors	2025–26	Malaysia Super League	2	0	0	0	0	0	–		2	0
Kelantan The Real Warriors	Total		2	0	0	0	0	0	0	0	2	0
Career total			0	0	0	0	0	0	0	0	0	0
