= 2020 Kelantan United F.C. season =

Kelantan United
2020 season
- President: Che Abdullah Mat Nawi
- Executive director: Anas Karimi
- Head coach: Zahasmi Ismail
- Stadium: Sultan Muhammad IV Stadium
- Malaysia Premier League: 8th
- Malaysia FA Cup: Cancelled
- Malaysia Cup: Cancelled
- Top goalscorer: League: Alfusainey Gassama (6); All: Alfusainey Gassama (6)
| Home colours | Away colours | Third colours |

The 2020 season was Kelantan United's 5th year in their history and first season in the Malaysia Premier League following promotion 2019 season. Along with the league, the club also participated in the Malaysia FA Cup and the Malaysia Cup.

== Events ==
- On 15 September 2020, Zahasmi Ismail contract has been terminated.
- On 6 December 2020, the club announced Akira Higashiyama as club's new head coach.
- On 10 October 2020, the club confirmed their slot in the Malaysia Cup after a narrow 2-1 victory over Selangor II in the league match.
- On 23 January 2020, the club has confirmed three foreign players signed a contract with the club.
- On 18 September 2020, Nazrulerwan Makmor joined the club as new head coach.

== Competitions ==
=== Malaysia Premier League ===
==== League table ====
| Pos | Team | Pld | W | D | L | GF | GA | GD | Pts | Qualification or relegation |
|---|---|---|---|---|---|---|---|---|---|---|
| 5 | Kuching City | 20 | 7 | 6 | 7 | 22 | 22 | 0 | 27 | Qualification for the Malaysia Cup group stage |
| 6 | Kelantan | 20 | 8 | 3 | 9 | 23 | 28 | −5 | 27 | Qualification for the Malaysia Cup group stage |
| 7 | Kelantan United | 20 | 8 | 2 | 10 | 25 | 28 | −3 | 26 | Qualification for the Malaysia Cup group stage |
| 8 | PDRM | 20 | 7 | 5 | 8 | 22 | 25 | −3 | 26 | |
| 9 | Selangor II (Note: Johor Darul Ta'zim II, Perak II, Selangor II and Terengganu II cannot be promoted from Malaysia Premier League and play in Malaysia Cup as Johor Darul Ta'zim F.C., Perak FA, Selangor F.C. and Terengganu FC (their parent clubs) remain in Malaysia Super League and play in Malaysia Cup. Should the team be relegated to Malaysia Premier League or will not play in Malaysia Cup, Johor Darul Ta'zim II, Perak II, Selangor II and Terengganu II will have to drop to Malaysia M3 League or will play in Malaysia Cup.) | 20 | 5 | 9 | 6 | 27 | 26 | +1 | 24 | |

Source: MFL
Rules for classification: 1) Points; 2) Goal difference; 3) Number of goals scored.

== Statistics ==
=== Appearances and goals ===
Players with no appearances not included in the list. The plus (+) symbol denotes an appearance as a substitute, hence 2+1 indicates two appearances in the starting XI and one appearance as a substitute.

| No. | Pos | Nat | Player | Total | | Premier League | |
| No. | Pos | Nat | Player | Apps | Goals | Apps | Goals |
Goalkeepers
| 1 | GK | (Malaysia) MAS | Shahrizan Ismail | 7 | 0 | 7 | 0 |
| 13 | GK | (Malaysia) MAS | Fikri Amin | 0 | 0 | 0 | 0 |
| 39 | GK | (Malaysia) MAS | Syazwan Yusoff | 4 | 0 | 4 | 0 |
Defenders
| 2 | DF | (Malaysia) MAS | Asyraf Hanif | 3 | 0 | 3 | 0 |
| 3 | DF | (Malaysia) MAS | Nazri Muhamad | 3 | 0 | 2+1 | 0 |
| 5 | DF | (Brazil) BRA | Alemão | 10 | 0 | 10 | 0 |
| 20 | DF | (Malaysia) MAS | Shamsul Kamal | 2 | 0 | 2 | 0 |
| 24 | DF | (Malaysia) MAS | Amirizdwan Taj | 5 | 0 | 3+2 | 0 |
| 25 | DF | (Malaysia) MAS | Ridhwan Deraman | 0 | 0 | 0 | 0 |
| 27 | DF | (Malaysia) MAS | Faizol Nazlin | 9 | 0 | 9 | 0 |
| 28 | DF | (Malaysia) MAS | Aziz Ismail | 7 | 0 | 7 | 0 |
| 34 | DF | (Malaysia) MAS | Luqman Hakim | 0 | 0 | 0 | 0 |
| 37 | DF | (Malaysia) MAS | Umeir Aznan | 2 | 0 | 0+2 | 0 |
| 55 | DF | (Malaysia) MAS | Daudsu Jamaludin | 6 | 0 | 6 | 0 |
Midfielders
| 6 | MF | (Malaysia) MAS | Aizzat Maidin | 2 | 0 | 2 | 0 |
| 7 | MF | (Malaysia) MAS | Rozaimi Azwar | 8 | 0 | 5+3 | 0 |
| 8 | MF | (Malaysia) MAS | Shahrul Hakim | 10 | 1 | 7+3 | 1 |
| 11 | MF | (Malaysia) MAS | Alif Romli | 6 | 0 | 6 | 0 |
| 14 | MF | (Malaysia) MAS | Aiman Yusoff | 1 | 0 | 0+1 | 0 |
| 17 | MF | (Morocco) MAR | Adil Kouskous | 9 | 0 | 8+1 | 0 |
| 18 | MF | (Malaysia) MAS | Khairul Izuan | 9 | 2 | 4+5 | 2 |
| 21 | MF | (Malaysia) MAS | Mathias Mansor | 0 | 0 | 0 | 0 |
| 26 | MF | (Malaysia) MAS | Fadhilah Pauzi | 7 | 0 | 6+1 | 0 |
| 77 | MF | (Malaysia) MAS | Fazrul Amir | 7 | 0 | 2+5 | 0 |
Forwards
| 9 | FW | (Iraq) IRQ | Selwan Al Jaberi | 8 | 0 | 6+2 | 0 |
| 10 | FW | (Malaysia) MAS | Fakhrul Zaman | 10 | 3 | 8+2 | 3 |
| 19 | FW | (Malaysia) MAS | Azrin Sharifulbahri | 0 | 0 | 0 | 0 |
| 22 | FW | (Malaysia) MAS | Faizwan Abdullah | 4 | 0 | 1+3 | 0 |
| 29 | FW | (The Gambia) GAM | Alfusainey Gassama | 11 | 6 | 11 | 6 |
| 30 | FW | (Malaysia) MAS | Nizad Ayub | 4 | 0 | 2+2 | 0 |

Last updated: 9 October 2020
Source: FAM-CMS
