= Syaahir Saiful =

Malaysian footballer

Personal information
- Full name: Muhammad Syaahir bin Saiful Nizam
- Date of birth: 30 June 2003 (age 23)
- Place of birth: Kuantan, Malaysia
- Position: Forward

Team information
- Current team: Kelantan The Real Warriors
- Number: 19

Youth career
- Sri Pahang U23

Senior career*
Years	Team	Apps	(Gls)
2021–2025	Sri Pahang	15	(0)
2025–	Kelantan The Real Warriors	1	(0)

International career^{‡}
2023	Malaysia U23	0	(0)
- * Club domestic league appearances and goals ‡ National team caps and goals as of 24 October 2025

Muhammad Syaahir bin Saiful Nizam (born 30 June 2003) is a Malaysian professional footballer who plays as a forward for Malaysia Super League club Kelantan The Real Warriors.

== Career statistics ==
=== Club ===
As of match played 24 October 2025

Club	Season	League			Cup		League Cup		Continental		Total	
Club	Season	Division	Apps	Goals	Apps	Goals	Apps	Goals	Apps	Goals	Apps	Goals
Sri Pahang	2021	Malaysia Super League	4	0	–		5	0	–		9	0
Sri Pahang	2022	Malaysia Super League	8	0	1	0	0	0	–		9	0
Sri Pahang	2023	Malaysia Super League	1	0	0	0	0	0	–		1	0
Sri Pahang	2024–25	Malaysia Super League	2	0	0	0	1	0	–		3	0
Sri Pahang	Total		15	0	1	0	6	0	0	0	22	0
Kelantan The Real Warriors	2025–26	Malaysia Super League	1	0	1	0	0	0	–		2	0
Kelantan The Real Warriors	Total		1	0	1	0	0	0	0	0	2	0
Career total			0	0	0	0	0	0	0	0	0	0
