= Asraff Aliffuddin =

Malaysian footballer (born 1999)

Personal information
- Full name: Muhammad Asraff Aliffuddin bin Yasin
- Date of birth: 13 June 1999 (age 27)
- Place of birth: Malaysia
- Height: 1.74 m (5 ft 8 1/2 in)
- Position: Forward

Team information
- Current team: Kelantan The Real Warriors
- Number: 88

Youth career
- 2017–2019: PKNS
- 2020: Selangor II

Senior career*
Years	Team	Apps	(Gls)
2021–	Kelantan The Real Warriors	69	(6)
- * Club domestic league appearances and goals as of 24 October 2025

Muhammad Asraff Aliffuddin bin Yasin (born 13 June 1999) is a Malaysian footballer who plays as a forward for Malaysia Super League club Kelantan The Real Warriors. He also can operate as an attacking midfielder and winger.

== Club career ==
=== Early career ===
Asraff played for PKNS and Selangor II at youth level.

=== Kelantan The Real Warriors ===
On 27 December 2020, Asraff joined Kelantan The Real Warriors for the 2021 Malaysia Premier League season.

On 19 December 2021, his contract with the club was extended for another year.

On 26 March 2024, his contract with the club was extended for another year.

== Career statistics ==
=== Club ===
As of 24 October 2025

Appearances and goals by club, season and competition
Club	Season	League			Cup		League Cup		Continental		Other		Total	
Club	Season	Division	Apps	Goals	Apps	Goals	Apps	Goals	Apps	Goals	Apps	Goals	Apps	Goals
Kelantan The Real Warriors	2021	Malaysia Premier League	16	1	—		4	0	—		—		20	1
Kelantan The Real Warriors	2022	Malaysia Super League	17	4	2	1	2	0	—		—		21	5
Kelantan The Real Warriors	2023	Malaysia Super League	21	1	1	0	2	0	—		3 (Note: Appearances in MFL Challenge Cup)	1	27	2
Kelantan The Real Warriors	2024–25	Malaysia Super League	13	0	1	0	1	0	—		—		15	0
Kelantan The Real Warriors	2025–26	Malaysia Super League	2	0	1	0	0	0	—		—		3	0
Kelantan The Real Warriors	Total		69	6	5	1	9	0	0	0	3	1	86	8
Career Total			69	6	5	1	9	0	0	0	3	1	86	8
