= T. Saravanan =

Malaysian association football player

Personal information
- Full name: Saravanan a/l Thirumurugan
- Date of birth: 26 February 2001 (age 25)
- Place of birth: Selangor, Malaysia
- Height: 1.80 m (5 ft 11 in)
- Position: Winger

Team information
- Current team: Star City F.C.
- Number: 8

Youth career
- 2019: Selangor U21

Senior career*
Years	Team	Apps	(Gls)
2020–2022	Selangor II	22	(2)
2022	→ Penang (loan)	18	(3)
2023	Kuala Lumpur City	21	(2)
2024–2025	Sri Pahang	13	(2)
2025–2026	Kelantan The Real Warriors	7	(1)

International career^{‡}
2021–2024	Malaysia U23	8	(2)
2023	Malaysia U22	4	(4)
- * Club domestic league appearances and goals as of July 2026 ‡ National team caps and goals as of 23 April 2023

Saravanan a/l Thirumurugan (born 26 February 2001), simply known as T. Saravanan, is a Malaysian professional footballer who plays as a winger.

== Club career ==
=== Selangor II ===
Saravanan spent two seasons playing for Selangor II from 2020 to 2022.

==== Loan to Penang ====
Saravanan was then loaned to Malaysia Super League club, Penang ahead of the 2022 season.

=== Kuala Lumpur City ===
On 19 February 2023, Saravanan signed a contract with Kuala Lumpur City.

== International career ==
=== Youth ===
Saravanan made one appearance in 2022 AFF U-23 Championship. During the 2023 Southeast Asia Games, he famously scored a poker (four goals) against rivals, Singapore where Malaysia won 7–0.

== Career statistics ==
=== Club ===
As of match played 25 October 2025

Club	Season	League			Cup		League Cup		Continental		Total	
Club	Season	Division	Apps	Goals	Apps	Goals	Apps	Goals	Apps	Goals	Apps	Goals
Selangor II	2020	Malaysia Premier League	8	0	–		–		–		8	0
Selangor II	2021	Malaysia Premier League	14	2	–		–		–		14	2
Selangor II	Total		22	2	–		–		–		22	2
Penang (loan)	2022	Malaysia Super League	18	3	3	1	2	0	–		23	4
Penang (loan)	Total		18	3	3	1	2	0	–		23	4
Kuala Lumpur City	2023	Malaysia Super League	21	2	4	2	5	0	0	0	30	4
Kuala Lumpur City	Total		21	2	4	2	5	0	0	0	30	4
Sri Pahang	2024–25	Malaysia Super League	13	2	0	0	0	0	1	1	14	3
Sri Pahang	Total		13	2	0	0	0	0	1	1	14	3
Kelantan The Real Warriors	2025–26	Malaysia Super League	7	1	3	0	0	0	0	0	10	1
Kelantan The Real Warriors	Total		7	1	3	0	0	0	0	0	10	1
Career total			0	0	0	0	0	0	0	0	0	0
