= Azfar Arif =

Malaysian footballer (born 1999)

Personal information
- Full name: Muhammad Azfar Arif bin Mohd Sukri
- Date of birth: 21 April 1999 (age 27)
- Place of birth: Terengganu, Malaysia
- Height: 1.85 m (6 ft 1 in)
- Position: Goalkeeper

Team information
- Current team: Kelantan The Real Warriors
- Number: 18

Youth career
- 2017–2019: UiTM

Senior career*
Years	Team	Apps	(Gls)
2020–2021	UiTM	18	(0)
2022	Petaling Jaya City	0	(0)
2023	Penang	16	(0)
2024–2025	Sri Pahang	7	(0)
2025–	Kelantan The Real Warriors	2	(0)
- * Club domestic league appearances and goals as of 26 September 2025

Muhammad Azfar Arif bin Mohd Sukri (born 21 April 1999) is a Malaysian professional footballer who plays as a goalkeeper for Malaysia Super League club Kelantan The Real Warriors.

== Club career ==
=== Petaling Jaya City ===
On 6 February 2022, Azfar joined Petaling Jaya City.

=== Penang ===
On 16 December 2022, Azfar joined Malaysia Super League club Penang.

=== Sri Pahang ===
On 9 February 2024, Azfar signed a one-year contract with Sri Pahang.

== Career statistics ==
=== Club ===
As of 20 September 2025

Appearances and goals by club, season and competition
Club	Season	League			Cup		League Cup		Continental		Total	
Club	Season	Division	Apps	Goals	Apps	Goals	Apps	Goals	Apps	Goals	Apps	Goals
UiTM	2020	Malaysia Super League	9	0	0	0	0	0	0	0	9	0
UiTM	2021	Malaysia Super League	9	0	0	0	0	0	0	0	9	0
UiTM	Total		18	0	0	0	0	0	0	0	18	0
Penang	2023	Malaysia Super League	16	0	2	0	1	0	3	0	22	0
Penang	Total		16	0	2	0	1	0	3	0	22	0
Sri Pahang	2024–25	Malaysia Super League	7	0	0	0	2	0	—		9	0
Sri Pahang	Total		7	0	0	0	2	0	—		9	0
Kelantan The Real Warriors	2025–26	Malaysia Super League	2	0	0	0	0	0	—		2	0
Kelantan The Real Warriors	Total		2	0	0	0	0	0	—		2	0
