= Baqiuddin Shamsudin =

Malaysian footballer

Personal information
- Full name: Muhamad Baqiuddin bin Shamsudin
- Date of birth: 14 December 1994 (age 31)
- Place of birth: Kuala Lipis, Malaysia
- Height: 1.65 m (5 ft 5 in)
- Position: Winger

Team information
- Current team: Terengganu
- Number: 77

Youth career
- 2014–2015: Sri Pahang U21

Senior career*
Years	Team	Apps	(Gls)
2016	Shahzan Muda	0	(0)
2017	Kuantan	0	(0)
2018	PDRM	0	(0)
2019–2020	UKM	26	(3)
2021–2025	Sri Pahang	82	(3)
2025–	Terengganu	3	(0)
- * Club domestic league appearances and goals as of 22 August 2025

Muhamad Baqiuddin bin Shamsudin (born 14 December 1994) is a Malaysian footballer who plays as a winger for Malaysia Super League club Terengganu.

== Club career ==
=== Terengganu ===
On 23 June 2025, it was announced the Baqiuddin signed a contract with Terengganu.

== Career statistics ==
=== Club ===
As of match played 18 June 2025

Appearances and goals by club, season and competition
Club	Season	League			Cup		League Cup		Continental		Total	
Club	Season	Division	Apps	Goals	Apps	Goals	Apps	Goals	Apps	Goals	Apps	Goals
UKM	2020	Malaysia Premier League	11	3	0	0	0	0	–		11	3
UKM	Total		11	3	0	0	0	0	–		11	3
Sri Pahang	2021	Malaysia Super League	21	2	0	0	6	0	–		27	2
Sri Pahang	2022	Malaysia Super League	16	0	2	0	2	0	–		20	0
Sri Pahang	2023	Malaysia Super League	24	1	2	0	4	1	–		30	2
Sri Pahang	2024–25	Malaysia Super League	21	0	1	0	6	0	–		28	0
Sri Pahang	Total		82	3	5	0	18	0	–		105	3
Terengganu	2025–26	Malaysia Super League	0	0	0	0	0	0	–		0	0
Terengganu	Total		0	0	0	0	0	0	–		0	0
Career Total			0	0	0	0	0	0	–	–	0	0
