= Habib Haroon =

Bahraini footballer (born 2000)

Personal information
- Full name: Habib Haroon Haroon Saeed
- Date of birth: 5 October 2000 (age 26)
- Place of birth: Manama, Bahrain
- Height: 1.70 m (5 ft 7 in)
- Position: Defensive midfielder

Senior career*
Years	Team	Apps	(Gls)
2018–2020	Al-Riffa	4	(0)
2020–2021	Al-Khaldiya		
2021–2023	Terengganu	53	(3)
2024	Kedah Darul Aman	7	(0)
2024	Sitra Club		
2025	Bahrain SC		
2025–2026	Kelantan The Real Warriors		
- * Club domestic league appearances and goals as of July 2026

Habib Haroon Haroon Saeed (Arabic: حبيب هارون هارون سعيد; born 5 October 2000) is a Bahraini professional footballer who plays as a defensive midfielder.

== Club career ==
=== Terengganu ===
On 14 June 2021, Habib signed a contract with Malaysian club Terengganu.

=== Kelantan The Real Warriors ===
In August 2025, Habib joined the Kelantan The Real Warriors team and was listed in a pre-season friendly match against Terengganu.

== Career statistics ==
=== Club ===
As of match played 20 September 2025

Appearances and goals by club, season and competition
Club	Season	League			Cup (Note: Malaysia FA Cup)		League Cup (Note: Malaysia Cup)		Continental		Total	
Club	Season	Division	Apps	Goals	Apps	Goals	Apps	Goals	Apps	Goals	Apps	Goals
Terengganu	2021	Malaysia Super League	9	0	–		8	0	–		17	0
Terengganu	2022	Malaysia Super League	21	3	4	0	6	0	–		31	3
Terengganu	2023	Malaysia Super League	19	0	3	0	1	0	6	0	29	0
Terengganu	Total		49	3	7	0	15	0	6	0	77	3
Kedah Darul Aman	2024-25	Malaysia Super League	7	0	5	1	0	0	-		12	1
Kedah Darul Aman	Total		7	0	5	1	0	0	0	0	12	1
Kelantan The Real Warriors	2025–26	Malaysia Super League	5	0	2	0	0	0	-		7	0
Kelantan The Real Warriors	Total		5	0	2	0	0	0	0	0	7	0
Career total			50	3	7	0	15	0	6	0	78	3

== Honours ==
Al-Riffa

- Bahraini Premier League: 2019
- Bahraini King's Cup: 2019
- Bahraini Super Cup: 2019

Terengganu FC

- Malaysia Super League runner-up: 2022
- Malaysia FA Cup runner-up: 2022
- Malaysia Charity Shield runner-up: 2023
- Malaysia Cup runner-up: 2023
