= Albert Kang =

Canadian soccer player (born 2001)

Personal information
- Date of birth: June 29, 2001 (age 25)
- Place of birth: Maple Ridge, British Columbia, Canada
- Height: 1.78 m (5 ft 10 in)
- Position: Midfielder

Team information
- Current team: Kelantan The Real Warriors
- Number: 8

Youth career
- 2018-2019: Vancouver Whitecaps
- 2019–2022: Loyola Greyhounds
- 2022: → Long Island Rough Riders (loan)
- 2023: Hofstra Pride

Senior career*
| Years | Team | Apps | (Gls) |
| 2024 | TSS Rovers | 3 | (0) |
| 2024–2025 | HNK Tomislav | 27 | (5) |
| 2025– | Kelantan The Real Warriors | 7 | (0) |
- * Club domestic league appearances and goals as of October 25, 2025

Albert Kang (born June 29, 2001) is a Canadian professional soccer player who plays as a midfielder for Malaysia Super League club Kelantan The Real Warriors.

== Club career ==
=== HNK Tomislav ===
On 6 July 2024, Kang was introduced as the club's new player.

=== Kelantan The Real Warriors ===
On 15 July 2025, Kang was introduced as the club's new player for the 2025–25 season. On 9 August 2025, Kang made his first league appearance for the club in a 0–4 defeat against Kuching City.

== Career statistics ==
As of October 25, 2025

| Club | Season | League | | | National Cup | | League Cup | | Continental | | Other | | Total | |
| Club | Season | Division | Apps | Goals | Apps | Goals | Apps | Goals | Apps | Goals | Apps | Goals | Apps | Goals |
|---|---|---|---|---|---|---|---|---|---|---|---|---|---|---|
| TSS FC Rovers | 2024 | League1 British Columbia | 3 | 0 | 1 | 0 | – | | – | | – | | 4 | 0 |
| Kelantan The Real Warriors | 2025–26 | Malaysia Super League | 7 | 0 | 3 (Note: Appearances in Malaysia FA Cup) | 0 | – | | – | | – | | 10 | 0 |
| Career total | | | 10 | 0 | 4 | 0 | 0 | 0 | 0 | 0 | 0 | 0 | 14 | 0 |
