= Abdul Sesay (footballer, born 2004) =

Sierra Leonean footballer (born 2004)

Personal information
- Date of birth: 24 April 2004 (age 22)
- Place of birth: Freetown, Sierra Leone
- Height: 1.87 m (6 ft 2 in)
- Position: Striker

Team information
- Current team: Kelantan The Real Warriors
- Number: 24

Youth career
- 2022: Kallon U19

Senior career*
Years	Team	Apps	(Gls)
2022	Diamond Stars		
2023	Kallon		
2024	Inter Lagos		
2025–	Kelantan The Real Warriors	4	(0)
- * Club domestic league appearances and goals as of 3 October 2025

Abdul Sesay (born 24 April 2004) is a Sierra Leonean footballer who plays as a striker for Malaysia Super League club Kelantan The Real Warriors.

== Club career ==
=== Kelantan The Real Warriors ===
On 16 July 2025, Sesay signed a one-year contract with Malaysia Super League club Kelantan The Real Warriors. On 30 August 2025, Sesay made his league debut in a 1–0 win over Penang in away match. On 17 October 2025, Sesay scored his first goal for the club in a 1–2 defeat Malaysia FA Cup match first leg.

== Career statistics ==
=== Club ===
As of match played 17 October 2025

Club	Season	League			Cup		League Cup		Continental/Other		Total	
Club	Season	Division	Apps	Goals	Apps	Goals	Apps	Goals	Apps	Goals	Apps	Goals
Kelantan The Real Warriors	2025–26	Malaysia Super League	4	0	2 (Note: Appearance(s) in Malaysia FA Cup)	1	0	0	–		6	1
Kelantan The Real Warriors	Total		4	0	2	1	0	0	0	0	6	1
Career total			0	0	0	0	0	0	0	0	0	0
