= Farris Izdiham =

Malaysian footballer (born 2001)

Personal information
- Full name: Muhammad Farris Izdiham bin Awang Kechik
- Date of birth: 27 July 2001 (age 25)
- Place of birth: Kelantan, Malaysia
- Positions: Midfielder; winger

Team information
- Current team: DPMM
- Number: 29

Youth career
- 2020: Kelantan
- 2021–2022: FAM-MSN Project

Senior career*
Years	Team	Apps	(Gls)
2021–2022	FAM-MSN Project	29	(3)
2023–2025	Perak	19	(0)
2025–2026	Kelantan TRW	23	(1)
2026–	DPMM	7	(0)
- * Club domestic league appearances and goals as of 20 November 2026

Muhammad Farris Izdiham bin Awang Kechik (born 27 July 2001) is a Malaysian professional footballer who plays as a midfielder or winger for Malaysia Super League club DPMM FC of Brunei.

== Club career ==
A native of the state of Kelantan in West Malaysia, Farris joined Malaysia Super League club Perak from the FAM-MSN Project Squad in October 2022. After two seasons with Perak, he transferred to Kelantan The Real Warriors for the 2025–26 campaign. He scored his first and only goal of the season in a 14–1 defeat to Johor Darul Ta'zim F.C. on 10 May 2026.

Farris was signed by MSL invited side DPMM FC of Brunei after a successful trial period in June 2026. His capture was unveiled by the club on 10 July 2026, alongside Danial Asri. He made his DPMM debut in a 0–1 victory over Penang on 23 August as a substitute. He scored his first goal for DPMM in a 3–3 draw against Kuala Lumpur City in the 2026–27 Malaysia FA Cup quarterfinal first leg on 20 September.

== Career statistics ==
=== Club ===
As of 20 November 2026

Appearances and goals by club, season and competition
Club	Season	League			FA Cup		Malaysia Cup		Other		Total	
Club	Season	Division	Apps	Goals	Apps	Goals	Apps	Goals	Apps	Goals	Apps	Goals
FAM-MSN Project	2021	Malaysia Premier League	17	1	0	0	0	0	0	0	17	1
FAM-MSN Project	2022	Malaysia Premier League	12	2	1	0	0	0	0	0	13	2
FAM-MSN Project	FAM-MSN Total		29	3	1	0	0	0	0	0	29	3
Perak	2023	Malaysia Super League	10	0	1	0	5	0	0	0	16	0
Perak	2024–25	Malaysia Super League	9	0	0	0	2	0	0	0	11	0
Perak	Perak Total		19	0	1	0	7	0	0	0	27	0
Kelantan The Real Warriors	2025–26	Malaysia Super League	23	1	3	0	2	0	3 (Note: Appearance(s) in MFL Challenge Cup)	1	31	2
DPMM	2026–27	Malaysia Super League	7	0	6	1	0	0	0	0	13	1
Career Total			78	4	11	1	9	0	3	1	101	6
