= Ibrahim Manusi =

Malaysian footballer

Personal information
- Full name: Ibrahim bin Manusi
- Date of birth: 30 September 2001 (age 25)
- Place of birth: Sungai Buloh, Selangor, Malaysia
- Height: 1.81 m (5 ft 11 in)
- Position: Centre-back

Team information
- Current team: Kuala Lumpur City (on loan from Johor Darul Ta'zim)
- Number: 30

Youth career
- 2021–2022: Sri Pahang U21
- 2023–2025: Sri Pahang U23

Senior career*
Years	Team	Apps	(Gls)
2022–2025	Sri Pahang	22	(0)
2025–	Johor Darul Ta'zim	0	(0)
2026–	→ Kuala Lumpur City (loan)	0	(0)

International career^{‡}
2026–	Malaysia	1	(0)
- * Club domestic league appearances and goals as of 20 April 2025 ‡ National team caps and goals as of August 16, 2026

Ibrahim bin Manusi (born 30 September 2001), better known as Ibrahim Manusi or just Ibrahim, is a Malaysian footballer who plays primarily as a centre-back for Malaysia Super League club Kuala Lumpur City, on loan from Johor Darul Ta'zim, and the Malaysia national team. Primarily a centre-back, he is also capable of playing either as right-back or defensive-midfielder.

== Club career ==
=== Sri Pahang ===
Born in Sungai Buloh, Selangor Ibrahim began his footballing career in Tunku Mahkota Ismail Sports School before signing with Sri Pahang in 2022. As an under-21 footballer, Ibrahim gained his first experience in the senior sides and was part of the first team from the 2022 Malaysia Super League season. He made his senior debut for the club on 1 October 2022 in a league match against Sarawak United, appearing as a substitute in a 4–1 win.

During the 2024–25 season, Ibrahim established himself as an important first team player for Sri Pahang. Ibrahim's consistent and influential performances helped his team through to Malaysia Cup final, with displaying impressive performances, despite losing to Johor Darul Ta'zim in the final.

=== Johor Darul Ta'zim ===
On 16 June 2025, Johor Darul Ta’zim announced the signing of Ibrahim Manusi from Sri Pahang, where he will don the number 27.

=== Kuala Lumpur City ===
On 20 August 2026, Ibrahim Manusi joined Kuala Lumpur City on loan from Johor Darul Ta’zim for the 26–27 season.

== International career ==
In July 2026, Ibrahim was selected to be part of the senior team for the 2026 ASEAN Championship. He made his international debut on 16 August in the match against Vietnam at the Kuala Lumpur Stadium.

== Career statistics ==
=== Club ===
As of match played 26 April 2025

Appearances and goals by club, season and competition
Club	Season	League			Cup (Note: Appearances in Malaysia FA Cup)		League Cup (Note: Appearances in Malaysia Cup)		Continental		Total	
Club	Season	Division	Apps	Goals	Apps	Goals	Apps	Goals	Apps	Goals	Apps	Goals
Sri Pahang	2022	Malaysia Super League	3	0	0	0	0	0	–		3	0
Sri Pahang	2023	Malaysia Super League	1	0	0	0	0	0	–		1	0
Sri Pahang	2024–25	Malaysia Super League	18	0	0	0	7	0	–		25	0
Sri Pahang	Total		22	0	0	0	7	0	–		29	0
Johor Darul Ta'zim	2025–26	Malaysia Super League	0	0	0	0	0	0	0	0	0	0
Johor Darul Ta'zim	Total		0	0	0	0	0	0	0	0	0	0
Career Total			22	0	0	0	7	0	0	0	29	0

== Honours ==
=== Johor Darul Ta'zim ===
- Malaysia Charity Shield: 2025
