= David Rowley =

Malaysian footballer

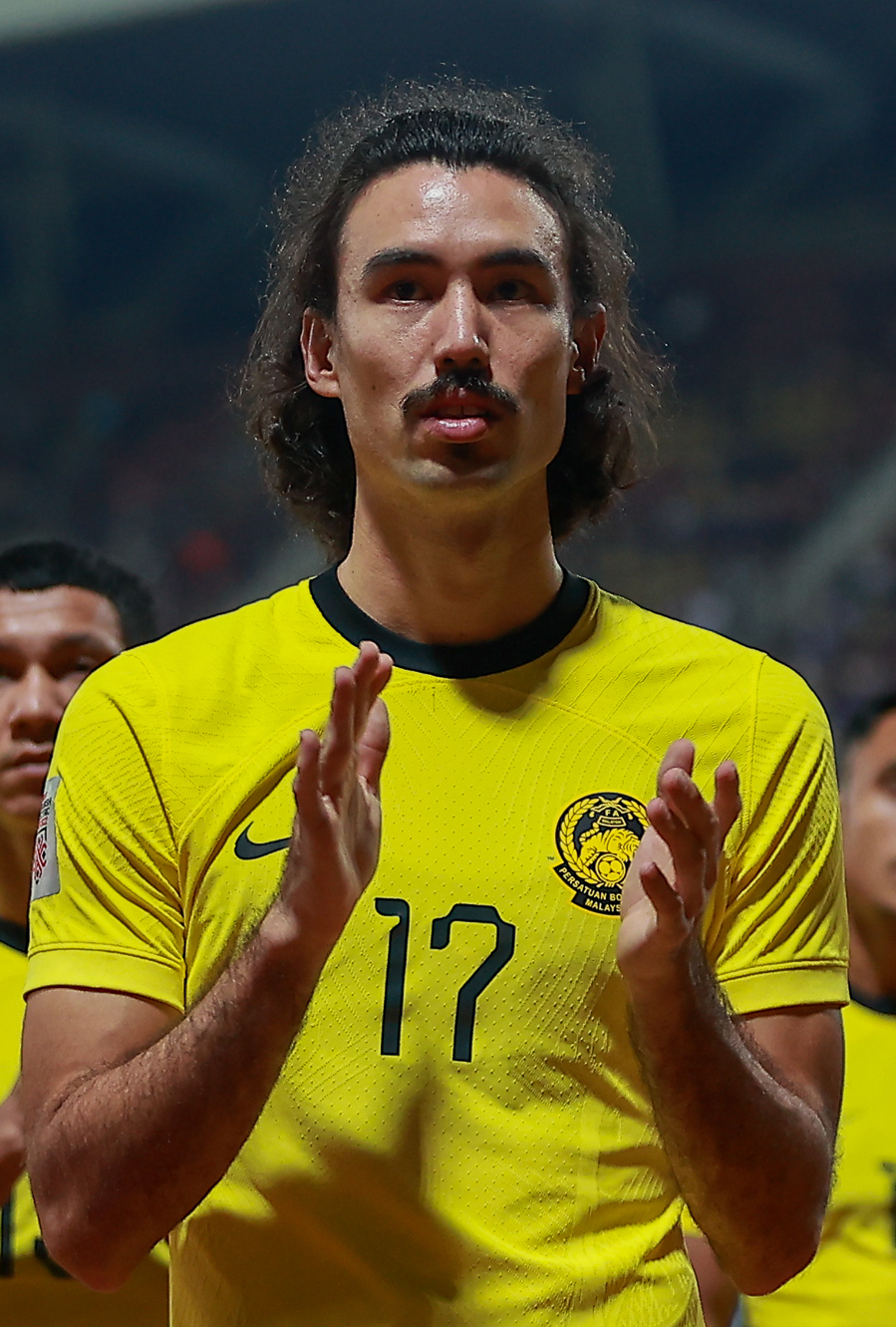
- Rowley with Malaysia in 2023

Personal information
- Full name: David Rowley
- Date of birth: 6 February 1990 (age 36)
- Place of birth: Brisbane, Australia
- Height: 6 ft 1 in (1.85 m)
- Position: Midfielder

Youth career
- Wynnum District SC
- Brisbane City

Senior career*
Years	Team	Apps	(Gls)
2008	Wynnum District		
2009–2012	Brisbane City		
2013	Chumphon		
2013	Nara United		
2014	CS Grevenmacher	6	(0)
2015–2016	Inter Leipzig	26	(7)
2016–2017	Tennis Borussia Berlin	18	(4)
2016–2017	Tennis Borussia Berlin II	1	(0)
2017–2018	BSC Rehberge Berlin	8	(1)
2018	PDRM	5	(0)
2018	Negeri Sembilan	1	(0)
2019	Kelantan	9	(0)
2019–2020	Kedah	9	(0)
2021	Penang	21	(3)
2022–2025	Sri Pahang	57	(9)
2025	Chanthaburi	6	(1)

International career
2022–	Malaysia	5	(0)
- * Club domestic league appearances and goals

David Rowley (born 6 February 1990) is a professional footballer who plays as a midfielder. Born in Australia, he plays for the Malaysia national team.

== Club career ==
=== Wynnum District SC ===
David Rowley began his career at Wynnum District Soccer Club in 2007/08.

=== Taringa Rovers ===
In 2008/09 he joined Taringa Rovers, making 17 league appearances.

=== Eastern Suburbs ===
Rowley joined Eastern Suburbs FC for the 2009–10 season.

=== Pine Hills FC ===
In 2009/10 he joined Pine Hills FC, making 17 league appearances.

=== Brisbane City ===
In 2010/11 he joined Brisbane City FC, making 40 league appearances and scoring 5 goals.

=== Chumphon ===
Rowley moved to Chumphon FC in February 2013 signing for the Thai Division 2 team.

=== Nara United ===
Rowley moved to Nara United in June 2013 and with them became champions of the league by finishing first in the Regional League Division 2 Southern Region.

=== Grevenmacher ===
In July 2014 he joined CS Grevenmacher in the Luxembourg 1st division, making 6 league appearances. He also scored 2 goals in the Luxembourg Cup against Hesperange in the Round of 16.

=== Inter Leipzig ===
Rowley moved to FC International Leipzig in July 2015. He finished the season with 28 appearances and 7 goals. His team achieved a 2nd-place finish in the NOFV- Oberliga Süd.

=== TeBe Berlin ===
In 2015/16 he joined Tennis Borussia Berlin, making 18 league appearances and scoring 4 goals.

=== Negeri Sembilan ===
On 12 May 2018, Rowley agreed to join Malaysia Super League side Negeri Sembilan but managed just one league appearance for the club. His playing time at Negeri Sembilan was cut short due to a knee injury that sidelined him for the majority of his stay at the club.

=== Kelantan ===
On 28 January 2019, Rowley signed a one-year contract with Malaysia Premier League side Kelantan, making 9 league appearances. During the mid-season window, Rowley was offered a contract by several Malaysian Super League clubs and in the end decided to join Kedah FA.

=== Kedah ===
In May 2019, Rowley signed for Kedah on a 6-month deal. On 27 July, Rowley went on to win the 2019 Malaysia FA Cup 1–0 in extra time in front of 83,520 fans against Perak.

As a result of winning the FA Cup, Kedah qualified for the Asian Champions League qualifiers in 2020.

On 25 September 2019, Rowley scored his first goal for Kedah in the 1st leg of a quarter-final Malaysian Cup away to PKNP. It was also the winning goal, sealing a 2–1 victory.

On the return leg, Rowley scored again in the 72nd minute, and Kedah produced a convincing 4–1 win to book a place in the semi-final of the Malaysia Cup.

On 2 November 2019, Kedah ended up as runners-up in the Malaysian Cup final after losing to Johor Darul Ta'zim at the Bukit Jalil stadium in front of 85,420 fans.

At the end of 2019, Kedah finished in 4th place in the Malaysian Super League. Rowley penned a 1-year extension on his contract thereafter.

In 2020, Rowley played in an Asian Champions League Qualifier against Seoul FC at the World Cup Stadium in South Korea.

In 2020, Rowley helped Kedah achieve a 2nd place in the Super League. During his time at Kedah, Rowley managed to make a total of 20 appearances for Kedah in all competitions, scoring 2 goals.

=== Penang ===
On 13 January 2021, Rowley signed with newly promoted Malaysia Super League side Penang. Rowley scored on his debut against Kuala Lumpur in the 29th minute and the team went on to win 1 nil. Rowley managed 25 appearances and 3 goals in all competitions helping Penang to achieve 3rd place in the Super League. It was also the best result for a newly promoted team ever in the Malaysian Super League.

=== Sri Pahang ===
In 2022, Rowley completed a move to Malaysia Super League side Sri Pahang. He finished the season with 18 league appearances and 6 goals.

== Personal life ==
Rowley was born in Australia to an Australian father and Malaysian Chinese mother.

== Career statistics ==
=== Club ===
As of 16 December 2023

Appearances and goals by club, season and competition
Club	Season	League			Cup		League Cup		Continental		Total	
Club	Season	Division	Apps	Goals	Apps	Goals	Apps	Goals	Apps	Goals	Apps	Goals
Negeri Sembilan	2018	Malaysia Super League	1	0	0	0	4	0	–		5	0
Kelantan	2019	Malaysia Premier League	9	0	0	0	0	0	–		9	0
Kedah	2019	Malaysia Super League	5	0	3	0	7	2	–		15	2
Kedah	2020	Malaysia Super League	4	0	0	0	0	0	1	0	5	0
Penang	2021	Malaysia Super League	21	3	0	0	4	0	–		25	3
Sri Pahang	2022	Malaysia Super League	18	6	2	0	2	0	–		20	6
Sri Pahang	2023	Malaysia Super League	20	2	1	0	2	1	0	0	23	3
Career Total			78	11	6	0	19	3	1	0	102	12

== Honours ==
Pahang

- Malaysia Cup runners-up: 2024

Kedah

- Malaysia FA Cup: 2019
- Malaysia Cup runners-up: 2019

Nara Utd

- Regional League South Division: 2013
