= Yusuf Sesay =

Sierra Leonean Football Player

Personal information
- Date of birth: 11 November 2002 (age 23)
- Place of birth: Kabala, Sierra Leone
- Height: 1.88 m (6 ft 2 in)
- Position: Centre-back

Senior career*
Years	Team	Apps	(Gls)
2019–2020	East End Lions		
2020–2021	Kallon		
2022–2025	Freetown City		
2022	→ Kamboi Eagles (loan)		
2023	→ Bo Rangers (loan)		
2025–2026	Kelantan The Real Warriors		

International career^{‡}
2024	Sierra Leone	3	(0)
- * Club domestic league appearances and goals as of July 2026 ‡ National team caps and goals as of 1 November 2024

Yusuf Sesay (born 11 November 2002) is a Sierra Leonean professional footballer who plays as a centre-back for the Sierra Leone national team.

== Club career ==
On 16 August 2025, Sesay signed a one-year contract with Malaysia Super League club Kelantan The Real Warriors.

== International career ==
On 6 January 2024, Sesay made his debut for the Sierra Leone national team in a friendly match against Ivory Coast.

== Career statistics ==
=== International ===
As of match played 1 November 2024

Appearances and goals by national team and year
National team	Year	Apps	Goals
Sierra Leone	2024	3	0
Total		3	0

== Honours ==
Bo Rangers

- Sierra Leone National Premier League: 2023–24
