= Prince Aggreh =

Nigerian football forward

Personal information
- Full name: Prince Obus Aggreh
- Date of birth: 30 September 1996 (age 30)
- Place of birth: Sapele, Nigeria
- Height: 1.70 m (5 ft 7 in)
- Position: Forward

Senior career*
Years	Team	Apps	(Gls)
2010–2011	Bendel Insurance		
2011–2013	Heartland	11	(0)
2013–2015	Sunshine Stars	39	(13)
2016–2017	Kano Pillars	24	(4)
2017	Ifeanyi Ubah	23	(6)
2018	Sporting Macau	15	(20)
2019	Al-Shabab		
2020–2021	Al-Muharraq		
2021–2022	Al-Kholood	8	(1)
2022	East Riffa		
2022–2023	Al-Khaldiya		
2023–2024	East Riffa		
2024–2025	PDRM		
2025–2026	Kelantan TRW		

International career^{‡}
2015–	Nigeria	4	(0)
- * Club domestic league appearances and goals as of July 2026 ‡ National team caps and goals as of 26 January 2016

Prince Obus Aggreh (born 30 September 1996 in Sapele) is a Nigerian professional footballer who plays as a forward.

== Club career ==
=== Ifeanyi Ubah ===
On 20 December 2016, Aggreh has completed his move from Kano Pillars to Ifeanyi Ubah.

=== Kelantan The Real Warriors ===
In July 2025, Aggreh signed a one-year contract with Malaysia Super League club Kelantan The Real Warriors.

== Career statistics ==
=== International ===
As of match played 25 March 2025

Appearances and goals by national team and year
National team	Year	Apps	Goals
Nigeria	2015	1	0
Nigeria	2016	3	0
Total		4	0
