= Azwan Aripin =

Malaysian footballer

Personal information
- Full name: Muhammad Azwan bin Aripin
- Date of birth: 21 April 1996 (age 30)
- Place of birth: Pasir Pekan, Malaysia
- Height: 1.71 m (5 ft 7 1/2 in)
- Positions: Left-back; wing-back

Team information
- Current team: Melaka
- Number: 23

Youth career
- 2014–2016: Kelantan

Senior career*
Years	Team	Apps	(Gls)
2016–2020	Kelantan	44	(2)
2021	Penang	17	(0)
2022–2025	Sri Pahang	62	(0)
2025–26	Kelantan The Real Warriors	8	(0)
2026–	Melaka	1	(0)
- * Club domestic league appearances and goals as of 25 October 2025

Muhammad Azwan bin Aripin (born 21 April 1996) is a Malaysian professional footballer who plays as a left-back or wing-back for Malaysia Super League club Melaka.

== Club career ==
=== Kelantan ===
Azwan began his career with Kelantan's youth team in 2014 before being promoted to first team in August 2016. Azwan was the captain for the Kelantan U19 that won the Malaysia Youth League title in 2014. He also was part of the Kelantan U21 team that won the President's Cup in 2016.

On 28 October 2017, Azwan made his first-team debut for Kelantan in a 1–3 win over Melaka United in the club's last fixture of the season. On 11 November 2017, it was announced that Azwan will be retained for another season with Kelantan. For 2018 season, Azwan made his season first appearance in 1–1 draw against Terengganu on 6 February 2018.

=== Penang ===
Azwan joined newly promoted club Penang in December 2020. He made his league first appearance in 2–0 defeat to Johor Darul Ta'zim on 9 March 2021.

== Career statistics ==
=== Club ===
As of match played 25 October 2025

Appearances and goals by club, season and competition
Club	Season	League			FA Cup		M'sia Cup		Continental		Total	
Club	Season	Division	Apps	Goals	Apps	Goals	Apps	Goals	Apps	Goals	Apps	Goals
Kelantan	2016	Malaysia Super League	0	0	0	0	1	0	–	–	1	0
Kelantan	2017	Malaysia Super League	1	0	0	0	0	0	–	–	1	0
Kelantan	2018	Malaysia Super League	19	0	2	0	7	0	–	–	28	0
Kelantan	2019	Malaysia Premier League	16	2	1	0	3	0	–	–	20	2
Kelantan	2020	Malaysia Premier League	8	0	0	0	1	0	–	–	9	0
Kelantan	Total		44	2	3	0	12	0	–	–	59	2
Penang	2021	Malaysia Super League	17	0	–	–	3	0	–	–	20	0
Penang	Total		17	0	–	–	3	0	–	–	20	0
Sri Pahang	2022	Malaysia Super League	20	0	2	1	1	0	–	–	23	1
Sri Pahang	2023	Malaysia Super League	24	0	1	0	3	0	–	–	28	0
Sri Pahang	2024–25	Malaysia Super League	18	0	1	0	5	0	–	–	24	0
Sri Pahang	Total		62	0	4	1	9	0	–	–	75	1
Kelantan The Real Warriors	2025–26	Malaysia Super League	8	0	3	0	0	0	–	–	11	0
Kelantan The Real Warriors	Total		8	0	3	0	0	0	–	–	11	0
Career Total			131	2	10	1	24	0	–	–	165	3

== Honours ==
=== Club ===
Kelantan U19

- Malaysia Youth League: 2014

Kelantan U21

- Malaysia President Cup: 2016

Sri Pahang

- Malaysia Cup: 2024–25 (runners-up)
