= Kpah Sherman =

Liberian footballer

Personal information
- Full name: Kpah Sean Sherman
- Date of birth: 3 February 1992 (age 34)
- Place of birth: Monrovia, Liberia
- Height: 1.83 m (6 ft 0 in)
- Position: Forward

Team information
- Current team: Melaka
- Number: 9

Senior career*
Years	Team	Apps	(Gls)
–2009	Aries FC	30	(20)
2010	Mighty Barrolle	14	(8)
2010–2011	Barrack Young Controllers	12	(5)
2011	Harnosands FF	10	(4)
2011–2012	Düzkaya	13	(8)
2012–2013	Çetinkaya	23	(14)
2013–2014	→ Lefke Türk S.K. (loan)	24	(16)
2014–2015	Young Africans	16	(6)
2015–2017	Black Aces	5	(0)
2016	→ Santos (loan)	8	(1)
2017	Çetinkaya	7	(0)
2017–2018	MISC-MIFA	29	(21)
2019	PKNS	19	(14)
2020–2021	Kedah Darul Aman	28	(19)
2022	Terengganu	14	(6)
2023–2025	Sri Pahang	42	(20)
2025–2026	Kuala Lumpur City	22	(5)
2026–	Melaka	0	(0)

International career^{‡}
2014–	Liberia	26	(4)
- * Club domestic league appearances and goals as of 17 May 2026 ‡ National team caps and goals as of 17 November 2026

Kpah Sean Sherman (born 3 February 1992) is a Liberian professional footballer who plays as a forward for Malaysia Super League side Melaka.

== Career ==
Sherman's football career began with his local team Aries FC in Liberia before moving to Barrolle FC. After an impressive display at Barrolle he was signed by Liberian club Barrack Young Controllers FC. Sherman spent a season with them and later moved to Sweden to join Harnosand FC. Cyprus League side Cetinkaya TSK then signed him for the 2012–13 season. After a good season, he joined Lefke Türk S.K. and later moved to Young Africans S.C. in the Tanzania League. He became one of the club's top forwards.

After winning the 2014–15 Tanzanian Premier League, Mpumalanga Black Aces F.C. signed him to a three-year contract, and he made his debut in a match against Orlando Pirates on 8 September 2015.

=== Northern Cyprus ===
Sherman Moved to Cetinkaya TSK in 2012. He was said to have been in phenomenal form in the KTFF Süper Lig, scoring 8 goals with Cetinkaya TSK by February 2013 and was among the top scorers. Instrumental to Cetinkaya TSK's 2012–13 title, he won the 2014–15 Tanzanian Premier League after transferring to Young Africans S.C., making him the first Liberian to win league titles in two different countries.

=== South Africa ===
Sherman transferred to Mpumalanga Black Aces F.C. in 2015. When the first half of the 2015-16 National First Division was over, Mpumalanga Black Aces F.C. loaned him to Santos Engen in the winter transfer window. Santos Engen chief director Zeca Marques commended the Liberian international as "arguably one of the best players we ever signed."

=== Malaysia ===
In 2017, Sherman signed for MISC-MIFA. He scored his first goal for them in a 3–3 draw with UiTM F.C. and scored 6 goals by the end of September, finishing the season with 7 goals and 3 assists in 9 appearances, helping MISC-MIFA avoid relegation and extending his contract for the 2018 season. On 7 December 2018, Sherman signed for Malaysia Super League club PKNS. He helped PKNS FC retain its spot in Malaysian Super League by scoring 14 goals in 19 games. He went on to finish the 2019 season as the Super League Golden Boot winner. On 27 November 2019, Sherman joined Malaysia Super League club Kedah FA. He later signed for rival Sri Pahang in 2023.

== Career statistics ==
As of 23 June 2023

=== Club ===
Club	Season	League	League		Cup		League Cup		Continental		Total	
Club	Season	League	Apps	Goals	Apps	Goals	Apps	Goals	Apps	Goals	Apps	Goals
MISC-MIFA	2017	Malaysia Premier League	9	7	0	0	0	0	0	0	9	7
MISC-MIFA	2018	Malaysia Premier League	20	14	0	0	0	0	0	0	20	14
MISC-MIFA	Total		29	21	0	0	0	0	0	0	29	21
PKNS	2019	Malaysia Super League	19	14	4	2	6	1	–		29	17
Kedah Darul Aman	2020	Malaysia Super League	11	6	0	0	1	1	2	0	14	7
Kedah Darul Aman	2021	Malaysia Super League	17	13	0	0	6	1	–		23	14
Kedah Darul Aman	Total		28	19	0	0	7	2	2	0	37	21
Terengganu	2022	Malaysia Super League	14	6	3	0	5	7	–		22	13
Sri Pahang	2023	Malaysia Super League	20	11	1	0	0	0	0	0	21	11
Career total			110	71	8	2	18	10	2	0	142	83

== International career ==
Sherman made his international debut in an Africa Cup of Nations qualifying match against Lesotho on 30 May 2014.

=== International ===
As of match played 17 November 2026

Appearances and goals by national team and year
National team	Year	Apps	Goals
Liberia	2014	2	0
Liberia	2016	1	0
Liberia	2018	4	1
Liberia	2019	4	1
Liberia	2021	5	1
Liberia	2022	3	0
Liberia	2023	3	0
Liberia	2026	4	1
Total		26	4

=== International goals ===
Scores and results list Liberia's goal tally first.

No.	Date	Venue	Opponent	Score	Result	Competition
1.	11 September 2018	Samuel Kanyon Doe Sports Complex, Monrovia, Liberia	Nigeria	1–2	1–2	Friendly
2.	15 October 2019	Samuel Kanyon Doe Sports Complex, Monrovia, Liberia	Chad	1–0	1–0	2021 Africa Cup of Nations qualification
3.	6 September 2021	Japoma Stadium, Japoma, Cameroon	Central African Republic	1–0	1–0	2022 FIFA World Cup qualification
4.	17 November 2026	Samuel Kanyon Doe Sports Complex, Monrovia, Liberia	Cape Verde	1–0	2–0	2027 Africa Cup of Nations qualification

== Honors ==
Young Africans S.C.

- Tanzanian Premier League 2014-15

Çetinkaya TSK

- KTFF Super Lig 2012-13

Individual

- PFAM Player of the Month: April 2021
- Malaysia Super League: Top scorer 2019
