= Damyan Damyanov =

Bulgarian footballer

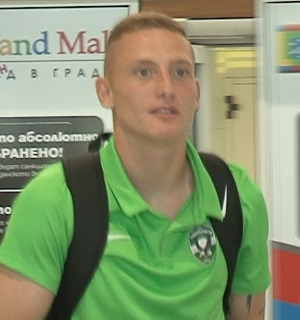

Personal information
- Full name: Damyan Valeriy Damyanov
- Date of birth: 29 July 2000 (age 26)
- Place of birth: Sofia, Bulgaria
- Height: 1.88 m (6 ft 2 in)
- Position: Goalkeeper

Team information
- Current team: Pattani
- Number: 13

Youth career
- Ludogorets

Senior career*
Years	Team	Apps	(Gls)
2016–2021	Ludogorets II	28	(0)
2018–2021	Ludogorets Razgrad	1	(0)
2021	→ Botev Vratsa (loan)	2	(0)
2021	→ Levski Lom (loan)	11	(0)
2022–2023	Lokomotiv Sofia	3	(0)
2023–2024	Dunav Ruse	42	(0)
2024–2025	Sportist Svoge	24	(0)
2025–2026	Kelantan TRW	18	(0)
2026–	Pattani	2	(0)

International career^{‡}
2015–2016	Bulgaria U17	1	(0)
2017–2019	Bulgaria U19	2	(0)
2021	Bulgaria U21	1	(0)
- * Club domestic league appearances and goals as of 12 September 2026 ‡ National team caps and goals as of 13 June 2021 (UTC)

Damyan Damyanov (Bulgarian: Дамян Дамянов; born 29 June 2000) is a Bulgarian professional footballer who plays as a goalkeeper for Thai League 1 club Pattani.

== Career ==
=== Ludogorets Razgrad ===
Damyanov made his professional debut for the first team on 20 May 2018 in a league match against Botev Plovdiv.

== Career statistics ==
=== Club ===
As of 28 September 2019

Club performance			League		Cup		Continental		Other		Total	
Club	League	Season	Apps	Goals	Apps	Goals	Apps	Goals	Apps	Goals	Apps	Goals
Bulgaria			League		Bulgarian Cup		Europe		Other (Note: Includes Bulgarian Supercup matches.)		Total	
Ludogorets Razgrad II	Second League	2016–17	2	0	–		–		–		2	0
Ludogorets Razgrad II	Second League	2017–18	3	0	–		–		–		3	0
Ludogorets Razgrad II	Second League	2018–19	2	0	–		–		–		2	0
Ludogorets Razgrad II	Second League	2019–20	7	0	–		–		–		2	0
Ludogorets Razgrad II	Total		17	0	0	0	0	0	0	0	14	0
Ludogorets Razgrad	First League	2017–18	1	0	0	0	0	0	0	0	1	0
Ludogorets Razgrad	Total		1	0	0	0	0	0	0	0	1	0
Career statistics			15	0	0	0	0	0	0	0	15	0
