= E. Elavarasan =

Malaysian football manager (born 1962)

Elavarasan a/l Elangowan
Personal information
- Full name: Elavarasan a/l Elangowan
- Date of birth: 5 January 1962 (age 64)
- Place of birth: Selangor, Malaysia

Team information
- Current team: Melaka (head coach)

Youth career
- Selangor

Senior career*
Years	Team	Apps	(Gls)
- Selangor

Managerial career
- 1994–1999: Public Bank
- 2001–2005: Public Bank
- 2006: Melaka
- 2009–2012: FELDA United
- 2012–2013: Terengganu
- 2015–2017: PKNS
- 2018: Melaka United
- 2019: PDRM
- 2020–2022: Sarawak United
- 2022 – 2024: Malaysia (assistant)
- 2022–2023: Malaysia U23
- 2025: Kelantan The Real Warriors
- 2026–: Melaka
- * Club domestic league appearances and goals

Elavarasan a/l Elangowan (born 5 January 1962), also known as Ela', is a Malaysian football coach. He is currently the head coach of Malaysia Super League club Melaka.

== Managerial career ==
He is a former Selangor state team player, last playing for Public Bank in the mid-eighties before coaching career. He guided Public Bank FC to winning the FAM League and gaining promotion to the Premier League. In 2003, he drove the team a step further by promotion to the Super League and finishing in 2nd place the following season.

After Public Bank FC decided to end their participation in the league, he was signed by Malacca FA and guided them into the Super League on the first year itself. Subsequently, he took the offer from Datuk Goh Seng Chong, the vice president of Malacca FA to join his organization.

In mid-season 2010, Felda United signed Elavasaran after their coach Reduan Abdullah was suspended by the FAM. Elavasaran guided them to win the Premier League and gain promotion to the Super League for the 2011 season. Elavasaran led Felda United to the quarter final of the 2012 Malaysia Cup.

On 18 October 2012, he moved to Terengganu FA, signing a 1-year contract. Terengganu under Elavarasan only managed to get 9th place in the 2013 Malaysia Super League, and failed to get past the group stage of the 2013 Malaysia Cup, in what proved to be his only season with the East Coast team.

For the 2015 season he joined PKNS F.C. as their new head coach. Achievements in PKNS include the 2016 Malaysia FA Cup final, where his team lose to Johor Darul Ta'zim F.C. 1–2. He was removed in July 2017, due to a string of poor results in all competitions.

In May 2018, he was hired by Melaka United, this time as replacement for Eduardo Almeida. Signing a 4-month contract, he saved Melaka from relegation, but announced departure in October.

In 2019, he was appointed as PDRM FC head coach, replacing Mohd Fauzi Pilus. Not only did E. Elavarsan saved PDRM from relegation, but the cops catapulted their way for promotion in 2020. In that the same year he stepped down from coaching PDRM.

He was hired by Sarawak United FC with the objective to secure promotion into the Malaysian Super League. Despite the impact of COVID-19 pandemic, Elavarasan was able to finish second in 2021. Due to the high demand of other teams, both parties agreed to his resignation.

On 23 February 2022, he was chosen by Kim Pan-gon as assistant coach of the Malaysia national football team. In September 2022, he took over as head coach of the Malaysia U23, and at the same time was the assistant coach of the national team. During his tenure, Malaysian U23 team has won the Merlion Cup in 2023 and qualified for the semi-final of the ASEAN U-23 Championship. He also led the team qualify for the AFC U-23 Asian Cup. He decided to resign on 18 September 2023.

== Managerial statistics ==
As of match played 21 November 2026

Managerial record by team and tenure
Team	Nat.	From	To	Record					Ref.
Team	Nat.	From	To	G	W	D	L	Win %	Ref.
Terengganu	(Malaysia)	18 October 2012	8 October 2013	34	13	8	13	38.24	
PKNS	(Malaysia)	1 January 2015	6 July 2017	85	46	14	25	54.12	
Melaka United	(Malaysia)	7 May 2018	13 November 2018	19	8	7	4	42.11	
PDRM	(Malaysia)	12 March 2019	31 December 2019	22	11	5	6	50.00	
Sarawak United	(Malaysia)	1 January 2020	22 February 2022	39	17	8	14	43.59	
Malaysia U23	(Malaysia)	1 September 2022	18 September 2023	13	8	1	4	61.54	
Kelantan TRW	(Malaysia)	1 July 2025	15 October 2025	9	3	2	4	33.33	
Melaka	(Malaysia)	8 January 2026	Present	25	7	6	12	28.00	
Career Total				246	113	51	82	45.93	
