= Kelantan The Real Warriors F.C. =

Malaysian football club

Kelantan The Real Warriors
- Full name: Kelantan The Real Warriors Football Club
- Nickname: The Real Warriors
- Short name: KTRW
- Founded: 2016; 10 years ago, as MPKB-BRI UBeS Football Club; 2017; 9 years ago, as Kelantan United Football Club; 2024; 2 years ago, as Kelantan Darul Naim Football Club; 2025; 1 year ago, as Kelantan The Real Warriors Football Club
- Ground: Sultan Muhammad IV Stadium
- Capacity: 30,000
- President: Annuar Musa
- CEO: Irwan Rizal
- Head coach: Vacant
- League: Malaysia Super League
- 2025–26: Malaysia Super League, 12th of 13 (ejected)
Home colours	Away colours	Third colours

Kelantan The Real Warriors Football Club (Malay: Kelab Bola Sepak Kelantan The Real Warriors) is a Malaysian professional football club based in Kota Bharu, Kelantan. The club last played in the Malaysia Super League, the top-flight football league of Malaysia, after being promoted from the Malaysia Premier League in 2022. The club was founded in 2016 as MPKB-BRI UbeS Football Club (Kota Bharu Municipal Council – Islamic City Youth and Sports Secretariat), before being reformed as Kelantan United in 2017, Kelantan Darul Naim and Kelantan The Real Warriors in 2024 and 2025 respectively. Their home stadium is Sultan Muhammad IV Stadium which has a capacity of 30,000.

== History ==
=== Formation and early years ===
The club was previously known as Majlis Perbandaran Kota Bharu-Bandar Raya Islam Urusetia Belia and Sukan Negeri Kelantan Football Club (MPKB-BRI UBeS FC). They entered the Malaysian football competition in 2016 when the club was accepted to compete in the FAM League. The club finished the season at the eight place.

=== Kelantan United ===
For the 2017 season, they participated in the Malaysia FA Cup. The club was later rebranded to Kelantan United Football Club as an effort to bring in support in the local area. In 2023, the club was promoted to the Malaysia Super League for the first time in their history. On 2 June 2023, Kelantan United recorded their first win in the top flight against city rivals Kelantan, with the score of 4–1.

=== Kelantan Darul Naim ===
In the 2024–25 Malaysia Super League season, Kelantan United was rebranded as Kelantan Darul Naim Football Club. The club's president Rozi Muhammad said the rebranding comes from the management's desire to unite Kelantan supporters under one banner. In November 2024, the club travelled to India and took part in the 2024 edition of the Sikkim Gold Cup.

=== The Real Warriors ===
In 2025, they were rebranded again, this time as Kelantan The Real Warriors Football Club. On 7 May 2025, Irwan Rizal has been appointed as the club's chief executive officer. On 15 July 2025, the club appointed Annuar Musa as the club's president. On 1 July 2025, the club appointed E. Elavarasan as the new head coach along with Muamer Salibašić as the assistant head coach. After the season, Kelantan The Real Warriors were ejected from the Super League due to failure in obtaining the license.

== Stadium and location ==
Coordinates	Location	Stadium	Capacity	Year
6°7′26″N 102°14′36″E	Kota Bharu	Sultan Muhammad IV Stadium	30,000	2016–present

== Crest and colours ==
=== Crest ===
The club has used one primary crest since its participation in the national level football league competition before the club introduce a new crest starting in 2017 season to solidify its new branding.

2016

2017–2018

2019–2022

2023

2024–2025

2025−present

=== Colours ===
Kelantan has mostly worn black with mixture of red as their home kit. For 2017 season, the club play in red with a trim of white for home kit. Kelantan's away colours are usually white with green trim.

== Kit and sponsorship ==
Since the 2024–25 season, the main equipment supplier has been PUC Sport.

Manufacturer
Period	Brand	Source
2016	Sala	
2017	GomoGi	
2018	Kronos	
2019–2020	SkyHawk	
2021	Umbro	
2022	Gatti	
2023	IAM	
2024–present	PUC Sport	

Shirt sponsor
Period	Sponsor	Source
2016	Minyak Mestika / SH Prima Trading	
2017	MPKB-BRI	
2018	Gelumbang Jaya	
2019	U-Shop / Mysports Station	
2020	Visit Kelantan 2020 / Jaya Mas Mining	
2021–2022	کلنتن ملڠکه ک هدڤن / Yakult	
2023	کلنتن ملڠکه ک هدڤن / Nasken Coffee	
2024–2025	Visit Kelantan 2024 / PUC Sport	
2025–present	KijangHandal / Al Hamra Group	

Other sponsor(s)
Period	Sponsor	Source
2025–present	redONE / Rohm / Qashwa Travel / Konsortium E-Mutiara / Klinik Safwa / d'Healthy / Fresh Life / Extra Joss / YPC Ice Cube / Eniq World Property / Bard Gym / WMC Berkat Printing / Dobi2all / Exa Supply & Services / Kemasin Beach Resort / Ekspres Perdana	

== Season-by-season record ==
Season	League										FA Cup	Malaysia Cup	Top goalscorer	
Season	Tier	League	P	W	D	L	F	A	Pts	Pos	FA Cup	Malaysia Cup	Name	Goals
2016	3	FAM	14	2	4	8	12	23	10	8th Group B	—N/a	—N/a	—N/a	—N/a
2017	3	FAM	14	5	6	3	21	16	21	5th, group A	R2	—N/a	(Malaysia) Raim Azmi	4
2018	3	FAM	12	2	2	8	13	21	8	7th, group A	—N/a	—N/a	(Malaysia) Masri Asyraf	5
2019	3	M3	26	21	3	2	93	20	66	1st	R3	—N/a	(Malaysia) Fakhrul Zaman	35
2020	2	MPL	11	4	0	7	13	19	12	8th	—N/a	—N/a	(The Gambia) Gassama Alfussainey	6
2021	2	MPL	20	8	2	10	25	28	27	7th	—N/a	GS	(The Gambia) Gassama Alfussainey	12
2022	2	MPL	18	6	7	5	23	19	25	5th	R16	R2	(Nigeria) Jacob Njoku	10
2023	1	MSL	26	4	5	17	29	65	17	12th	R16	R16	(Philippines) OJ Porteria	7
2024–25	1	MSL	24	2	1	21	16	82	17	13th	R16	R16	(Palestine) Oday Kharoub	4
2025–26	1	MSL	24	4	3	17	17	63	15	12th	QF	R16	(Nigeria) Ifedayo Olusegun	6

Champions	Runners-up	Third place	Promoted	Relegated

- P = Played
- W = Games won
- D = Games drawn
- L = Games lost
- F = Goals for
- A = Goals against
- Pts = Points
- Pos = Final position
- N/A = No answer
- FAM = FAM League
- M3 = Malaysia M3 League
- MPL = Malaysia Premier League
- MSL = Malaysia Super League
- QR1 = First Qualifying Round
- QR2 = Second Qualifying Round
- QR3 = Third Qualifying Round
- QR4 = Fourth Qualifying Round
- RInt = Intermediate Round
- R1 = Round 1
- R2 = Round 2
- R3 = Round 3
- R4 = Round 4
- R5 = Round 5
- R6 = Round 6
- R16 = Round of 16
- GR = Group stage
- QF = Quarter-finals
- SF = Semi-finals
- RU = Runners-up
- S = Shared
- W = Winners

== Players (2025) ==
=== First-team squad ===
Note: Flags indicate national team as defined under FIFA eligibility rules; some limited exceptions apply. Players may hold more than one non-FIFA nationality.

No.	Pos.	Nation	Player
4	MF	ITA	Sebastian Avanzini
5	DF	CIV	Alexandre Yeoulé
7	FW	NGR	Prince Aggreh
8	MF	CAN	Albert Kang
10	MF	BHR	Habib Haroon
11	DF	MAS	Wan Amirul Afiq
12	FW	NGR	Ifedayo Olusegun (captain)
13	GK	BUL	Damyan Damyanov
14	MF	MAS	Azam Azih (vice-captain)
15	DF	MAS	Nik Umar
17	MF	MAS	Syafik Ismail
18	GK	MAS	Azfar Arif
19	MF	MAS	Syaahir Saiful
20	MF	MAS	Danial Haqim

No.	Pos.	Nation	Player
21	MF	MAS	Khairul Izuan
23	DF	MAS	Azwan Aripin
24	FW	SLE	Abdul Sesay
25	MF	MAS	Syahir Rashid
26	FW	MAS	T. Saravanan
27	MF	SWE	Saifu Izamander
29	MF	MAS	Farris Izdiham
30	MF	MYA	Hein Htet Aung
33	GK	MAS	Fikri Che Soh
36	FW	COD	Noel Mbo
45	DF	MAS	Faris Shah
50	DF	MAS	Rakesh Munusamy
55	DF	IDN	Yohanes Kandaimu
66	DF	SLE	Yusuf Sesay
70	FW	MAS	Sean Selvaraj
88	MF	MAS	Asraff Aliffuddin

== Club officials (2025) ==
=== Coaching staff ===
Position	Name
Head coach	Vacant
Assistant head coach	(Bosnia and Herzegovina) Muamer Salibašić
Assistant coach	Vacant
Goalkeeping coach	(Malaysia) Khairul Nizan Mohd Taib
Fitness coach	(Malaysia) Kamarul Dinis Kamarudin
Doctors	(Malaysia) Nabil Aiman Noor Adnan (Malaysia) Ahmad Baihaqi Abd Rahman (Malaysia) Muhammad Hafiz Kamaruzaman (Malaysia) Ahmad Waqiuddin Rajab
Physiotherapist	(Malaysia) Muhammad Amir Fadzlan
Kitmen	(Malaysia) Shamsudin Deraman (Malaysia) Zairul Fitree Ishak (Malaysia) Shahrul Ridzuan Samsuddin

=== Club personnel ===
Position	Name
President	(Malaysia) Annuar Musa
Chief executive officer	(Malaysia) Irwan Rizal
Director	(Malaysia) Rozi Muhamad

== Coaches ==
Name	Nationality	From	To
Mahadi Yusoff	Malaysia	2015	2016
Abdullah Muhammad	Malaysia	2016	2016
Azli Mahmood	Malaysia	2016	2016
Kamaruddin Muhammad	Malaysia	2017	2017
Abdullah Muhammad	Malaysia	2018	2018
Zahasmi Ismail	Malaysia	2019	17 September 2020
Akira Higashiyama	Japan	1 January 2021	30 June 2021
Nazrulerwan Makmor	Malaysia	19 July 2021	9 January 2022
Syamsul Saad	Malaysia	10 January 2022	8 August 2022
Tomáš Trucha	Czech Republic	30 December 2022	8 April 2023
Ailton Silva	Brazil	15 June 2023	21 November 2023
Park Jae-hong	South Korea	19 April 2024	24 January 2025
E. Elavarasan	Malaysia	1 July 2025	3 October 2025
Akmal Rizal	Malaysia	16 October 2025	11 March 2026

== Former captains ==
Tenure	Captain	Vice-captain
2025–	(Nigeria) Ifedayo Olusegun	(Malaysia) Azam Azih

== Club presidents ==
Name	Tenure
Che Abdullah Mat Nawi	–31 December 2022
Rozi Muhamad	31 December 2022–15 July 2025
Annuar Musa	15 July 2025–present

== Honours ==
=== League ===
- Division 3/M3 League
  - Champions (1): 2019

=== International competitions ===
- All India Governor's Gold Cup
  - Quarter-final: 2024

== Affiliated clubs ==
- (Uzbekistan) Bunyodkor (2025–present)

Kelantan The Real Warriors signed a Memorandum of Understanding with Bunyodkor of the Uzbekistan Super League in September 2025. This strategic collaboration covers technical aspects, friendly matches, player loans and academy development.
