= Faizal Arif =

Malaysian association football player

Personal information
- Full name: Muhammad Faizal bin Mohd Arif
- Date of birth: 5 March 1995 (age 31)
- Place of birth: Malaysia
- Height: 1.71 m (5 ft 7 in)
- Position: Defender

Team information
- Current team: Sri Pahang
- Number: 21

Youth career
- 2016–2019: UiTM

Senior career*
Years	Team	Apps	(Gls)
2020–	UiTM	19	(0)
2022–	Sri Pahang	0	(0)
- * Club domestic league appearances and goals as of 9 May 2021

Muhammad Faizal bin Mohd Arif (born 5 March 1995) is a Malaysian professional footballer who plays as a defender for Malaysia Super League club UiTM. Faizal served as the club's captain in 2020.
