= Stefano Brundo =

Argentine footballer (born 1993)

Personal information
- Date of birth: 19 May 1993 (age 33)
- Place of birth: Buenos Aires, Argentina
- Height: 1.91 m (6 ft 3 in)
- Position: Centre-back

Team information
- Current team: Penang
- Number: 15

Youth career
- All Boys

Senior career*
Years	Team	Apps	(Gls)
2014–2017	All Boys	15	(0)
2016	→ Comerciantes (loan)	31	(4)
2017–2018	Atlético de Rafaela	23	(2)
2018	3 de Febrero	1	(0)
2018	Gimnasia Mendoza	8	(10)
2019–2021	Atlético de Rafaela	13	(15)
2021	Carlos Stein	23	(20)
2022	Estudiantes BA	39	(1)
2023–2025	Sri Pahang	55	(19)
2025–	Penang	22	(4)
- * Club domestic league appearances and goals as of 17 August 2026

Stefano Brundo (born 19 May 1993) is an Argentine professional footballer who plays as a centre-back for and captains the Malaysia Super League side Penang.

== Career ==
All Boys were the opening club of Brundo's senior career, with the defender making his pro bow for them in September 2014 during a Primera B Nacional draw with Independiente Rivadavia. He remained for a total of three seasons in tier two, prior to Brundo departing on loan to newly promoted Comerciantes Unidos of the Peruvian Primera División. Thirty-one appearances followed as they qualified for the 2017 Copa Sudamericana, netting versus Alianza Atlético (2), Real Garcilaso and Universidad San Martín in the process. He returned to All Boys for the rest of 2016–17 but didn't feature due to an admin error.

Brundo joined Atlético de Rafaela on 14 August 2017. His first appearance arrived in a win away to Gimnasia y Esgrima (J) in September, which preceded twenty-two further matches along with two goals. July 2018 saw Brundo go abroad once more by signing for Paraguayan Primera División side 3 de Febrero. However, he left the Ciudad del Este club a month later - though did appear in one competitive fixture, against Cerro Porteño at home on 13 August. A move to Mendoza with Gimnasia y Esgrima followed in mid-2018, before the defender sealed a return to Atlético de Rafaela a year later.

In January 2021, after scoring once (versus ex-club All Boys) in thirteen games back with Rafaela, Brundo headed to Peru with Primera División outfit Carlos Stein. A year later, in January 2022, he returned to his homeland, after signing with Estudiantes de Buenos Aires.

In 2023, he extends his professional football career in Asia by joining five-time league titles Sri Pahang FC in Malaysia Super League. He becomes one of the key players for the club due to his techniques in taking set-pieces and the ability to score goals. He is currently the top goal-scoring defenders in the league with 8 goals in just 13 appearances. His finishing statistic is even higher than the club's main strikers.

On 10 June 2025, Super League club Penang announced the signing of Brundo on a free transfer from Sri Pahang.

== Career statistics ==
As of 31 January 2021.

Club statistics
Club	Season	League			Cup		Continental		Other		Total	
Club	Season	Division	Apps	Goals	Apps	Goals	Apps	Goals	Apps	Goals	Apps	Goals
All Boys	2014	Primera B Nacional	4	0	0	0	—		0	0	4	0
All Boys	2015	Primera B Nacional	10	0	0	0	—		0	0	10	0
All Boys	2016	Primera B Nacional	1	0	0	0	—		0	0	1	0
All Boys	2016–17	Primera B Nacional	0	0	0	0	—		0	0	0	0
All Boys	Total		15	0	0	0	—		0	0	15	0
Comerciantes Unidos (loan)	2016	Peruvian Primera División	31	4	—		—		0	0	31	4
Atlético de Rafaela	2017–18	Primera B Nacional	23	2	0	0	—		0	0	23	2
3 de Febrero	2018	Paraguayan Primera División	1	0	0	0	—		0	0	1	0
Gimnasia y Esgrima	2018–19	Primera B Nacional	8	0	0	0	—		0	0	8	0
Atlético de Rafaela	2019–20	Primera B Nacional	4	1	0	0	—		0	0	4	1
Atlético de Rafaela	2020	Primera B Nacional	9	0	0	0	—		0	0	9	0
Atlético de Rafaela	Total		13	1	0	0	—		0	0	13	1
Carlos Stein	2021	Peruvian Primera División	0	0	0	0	—		0	0	0	0
Total			0	0	0	0	0	0	0	0	0	0
Sri Pahang	2023	Malaysia Super League	0	0	0	0	0	0	0	0	0	0
Sri Pahang	2024–25	Malaysia Super League	0	0	0	0	0	0	0	0	0	0
Total			0	0	0	0	0	0	0	0	0	0
Penang	2025–26	Malaysia Super League	13	1	0	0	0	0	4	1	17	2
Penang	Total		13	1	0	0	0	0	4	1	17	2
Career total			91	7	0	0	—		0	0	91	7

== Honours ==
Penang

- MFL Challenge Cup runner-up: 2026
