= Sherzod Fayziev =

Uzbekistani footballer (born 1992)

Personal information
- Full name: Sherzod Naimovich Fayziev
- Date of birth: 6 February 1992 (age 34)
- Place of birth: Uzbekistan
- Height: 1.85 m (6 ft 1 in)
- Position: Defender

Team information
- Current team: Mash'al
- Number: 37

Youth career
- Mash'al

Senior career*
Years	Team	Apps	(Gls)
2011–2015	Mash'al	63+	(2+)
2016–2017	Lokomotiv (Tashkent)	38	(0)
2018	Metallurg (Bekabad)	27	(0)
2019	AGMK	7	(0)
2019	Sogdiana	12	(0)
2020–2022	Lokomotiv (Tashkent)	74	(0)
2022–2023	Sri Pahang	5	(0)
2024	Qizilqum	8	(0)
2025–	Mash'al	36	(2)
- * Club domestic league appearances and goals as of 29 July 2026

Sherzod Naimovich Fayziev (Russian: Шерзод Наимович Файзиев; born 6 February 1992) is an Uzbekistani footballer who plays as a defender for Mash'al.

== Career ==
Fayziev started his career with Uzbekistani side Mash'al, where he suffered relegation to the Uzbekistani second tier. Before the 2016 season, Fayziev signed for Lokomotiv (Tashkent) in Uzbekistan. Ahead of the 2020 season, he returned to Lokomotiv (Tashkent). In 2022, he signed for tier 1 club Sri Pahang. On 18 June 2022, Fayziev debuted for Sri Pahang during a 2–1 defeat to Sabah FC.
