= Suffian Awang =

Malaysian political secretary

Yang Berbahagia Datuk Mohammed Suffian Bin Awang

Political Secretary To The Prime Minister Of Malaysia
- Incumbent
- Assumed office 12 September 2009

Personal details
- Born: 7 June 1971 (age 55) Kuantan, Pahang

Datuk Dato' Mohammed Suffian Bin Awang (born 1971) is the political secretary for the current Prime Minister of Malaysia. Suffian is the advisor for the Kuntao Tekpi Malaysia a martial art organization practicing the ancient art of Malay self-defence. He is also an UMNO Youth Exco.

== Education ==
Suffian Awang received his Diploma in Public Administration and also his Bachelor of Laws (LLB) Hons. from Universiti Teknologi MARA Shah Alam.

== Politics ==
Suffian Awang is the youth Chief of UMNO Youth Kuantan Division and also the Chairman of the Barisan Nasional Youth Lab.

== International Seminar ==
Datuk Suffian Awang attended the Asean100, Leadership Forum 2007 on 22–23 August 2007 at The Melia Hotel, Hanoi, Vietnam. He represents UMNO Malaysia in presenting a case study on the political effects on youth.

International Visitor Leadership Program of the United States Department of State “Citizen Participation in a Democracy” on June 26 – July 17, 2008, Washington, D.C. (Representing UMNO Malaysia).

2012 Republican National Convention, Tampa Bay Florida on 27–29 August 2012. (Representing UMNO Malaysia).

== Facts ==
Suffian Awang's father, Awang Ahmad 81, is a member of EBAAM (Ex-British Army Association of Malaysia).
