= Zarif Irfan Hashimuddin =

Malaysian footballer

Zarif Irfan
Personal information
- Full name: Muhammad Zarif Irfan bin Hashimuddin
- Date of birth: 21 February 1995 (age 31)
- Place of birth: Kedah, Malaysia
- Height: 1.84 m (6 ft 0 in)
- Position: Goalkeeper

Senior career*
Years	Team	Apps	(Gls)
2015–2016	AirAsia	19	(0)
2016–2017	Selangor	2	(0)
2018–2019	PKNS	35	(0)
2020	Felda United	2	(0)
2021–2024	Sri Pahang	25	(0)
2025–2026	Immigration		

International career^{‡}
2013	Malaysia U23	1	(0)
- * Club domestic league appearances and goals as of July 2026 ‡ National team caps and goals as of 8 June 2019

Muhammad Zarif Irfan bin Hashimuddin is a Malaysian professional footballer who plays as a goalkeeper.

== Club career ==
=== AirAsia ===
Zarif was a baggage handler at a low-cost airline AirAsia and represented the company in the third tier Malaysia FAM League in 2015.

=== Selangor ===
After his contract with AirAsia expired, Zarif signed with Malaysia Super League side Selangor in December 2015. Zarif has not made any appearances for Selangor in 2016 season. On 21 January 2017, he made his league debut for Selangor in a 2–0 win over Penang in MP Selayang Stadium.

=== PKNS ===
In December 2017, Zarif signed a contract with Malaysia Super League club PKNS FC. He made his debut for the club on 14 July 2018 in a 4–0 win over Terengganu.

== Career statistics ==
=== Club ===
As of match played 12 September 2021

Appearances and goals by club, season and competition
Club	Season	League			Cup		League Cup		Continental		Total	
Club	Season	Division	Apps	Goals	Apps	Goals	Apps	Goals	Apps	Goals	Apps	Goals
Selangor	2016	Malaysia Super League	0	0	0	0	0	0	–		0	0
Selangor	2017	Malaysia Super League	1	0	0	0	1	0	–		2	0
Selangor	Total		1	0	0	0	1	0	–		2	0
PKNS	2018	Malaysia Super League	4	0	0	0	7	0	–		11	0
PKNS	2019	Malaysia Super League	18	0	4	0	0	0	–		22	0
PKNS	Total		22	0	4	0	7	0	–		33	0
Felda United	2020	Malaysia Super League	2	0	–						2	0
Felda United	Total		2	0	–						2	0
Sri Pahang	2021	Malaysia Super League	10	0	0	0	0	0	–		10	0
Sri Pahang	Total		10	0	0	0	0	0	0	0	10	0
