= Hasnul Zaim =

Malaysian footballer

Personal information
- Full name: Hasnul Zaim bin Zafri
- Date of birth: 17 August 2002 (age 24)
- Place of birth: Kuantan, Malaysia
- Height: 1.75 m (5 ft 9 in)
- Position: Centre-back

Team information
- Current team: Sri Pahang
- Number: 44

Youth career
- –2021: Sri Pahang U21

Senior career*
Years	Team	Apps	(Gls)
2021–2022	Sri Pahang	6	(0)
2023–2024	Perak	5	(0)
2024–2025	Sri Pahang	7	(0)
- * Club domestic league appearances and goals as of 22 February 2024

Hasnul Zaim bin Zafri (born 17 August 2002) is a Malaysian footballer who plays as a centre-back.

== Club career ==
=== Sri Pahang ===
Hasnul was graduated from Sri Pahang U21 team.

Hasnul made his Malaysia Super League debut for the club on 5 January 2021.
