= 2023 Kelantan United F.C. season =

Football club's debut season in Malaysia

Kelantan United
2023 season
- President: Rozi Muhamad
- Chief operating officer: Wan Mohd Zul Ikman
- Head coach: Tomáš Trucha (until 8 April); Nazrulerwan Makmor (interim, 8 April to 15 June); Ailton Silva (15 June to 21 November); Nazrulerwan Makmor (interim, from 21 November)
- Stadium: Sultan Muhammad IV Stadium
- Malaysia Super League: 12th
- Malaysia FA Cup: Round of 16
- Malaysia Cup: Round of 16
- MFL Challenge Cup: Semi-finals
- Top goalscorer: League: OJ Porteria (6 goals each); All: OJ Porteria (7 goals each)
- Highest home attendance: 2,910 (Kelantan United 4–1 Kelantan) (Malaysia Super League, 2 June 2023)
- Lowest home attendance: 73 (Kelantan United 0–4 Negeri Sembilan) (Malaysia Super League, 1 December 2023)
- Biggest win: 7–0 (Kelantan United vs Kelantan) (MFL Challenge Cup, 18 September 2023)
- Biggest defeat: 6–0 (Johor Darul Ta'zim vs Kelantan United) (Malaysia Super League, 13 May 2023); 1–7 (Kelantan United vs Selangor) (Malaysia Super League, 7 June 2023)
Home colours	Away colours	Third colours

The 2023 season was the eighth season in the existence of Kelantan United Football Club and the club's first season in the Malaysia Super League. In addition to the league, the team also participated in the Malaysia FA Cup, the Malaysia Cup and the MFL Challenge Cup.

== Coaching staff ==
Position	Staff
Team manager	(Malaysia) Zamri Ismail
Assistant manager	(Malaysia) Nik Khuzaimi Nudinb
Technical director	(Japan) Akira Higashiyama
Head coach	(Czech Republic) Tomáš Trucha
Assistant coaches	(Malaysia) Nazrulerwan Makmor
Assistant coaches	(Malaysia) Tengku Hazman
Goalkeeping coach	(Malaysia) Jamsari Sabian
Fitness coach	(Malaysia) Azizan Ghazali
Team doctor	(Malaysia) Dr Zairuddin
Physiotherapist	(Malaysia) Muhammad Amir Fadzlan
Media officer	(Malaysia) Ahmad Fadhli Sukardi
Official photographer	(Malaysia) Normeezan Nordin
Masseur	(Malaysia) Wan Muhamad Afif Wan Kamaruddin
Kitman	(Malaysia) Fadhli Ikram

== Players ==
=== First-team squad ===
As of 12 January 2023

Note: Flags indicate national team as defined under FIFA eligibility rules; some limited exceptions apply. Players may hold more than one non-FIFA nationality.

No.	Pos.	Nation	Player
1	GK	MAS	Asyraaf Omar
2	DF	MAS	Fauzan Fauzi
3	DF	MAS	Nazri Muhammad
5	DF	BRA	Yan Victor
6	DF	MAS	Tasnim Fitri
7	MF	SEN	Morgaro Gomis
8	MF	MAS	Khairu Azrin
9	FW	KGZ	Ernist Batyrkanov
10	MF	PHI	OJ Porteria
11	MF	MAS	Haziq Subri
13	DF	MAS	Latiff Suhaimi (vice-captain)
14	DF	MAS	Hafiy Haikal
15	FW	BRA	Gregory
16	MF	MAS	Royizzat Daud

No.	Pos.	Nation	Player
17	DF	MAS	Fandi Othman
19	FW	BRA	Devid
20	MF	MAS	Syazwan Salihin
21	MF	MAS	Sharvin Selvakumaran
22	MF	MAS	Syazwan Zainon
23	FW	MAS	Indra Putra Mahayuddin (captain)
25	GK	MAS	Ilham Amirullah
26	MF	MAS	Nik Azli
27	FW	MAS	Aqil Hilman
28	DF	MAS	Ariff Ar-Rasyid
29	GK	MAS	Jason Tew
30	FW	MAS	Asraff Aliffuddin
55	DF	MAS	Zulfahmi Skilee
66	GK	MAS	Muhammad Nor Amin

=== Transfers in ===
Note: Flags indicate national team as defined under FIFA eligibility rules; some limited exceptions apply. Players may hold more than one non-FIFA nationality.

No.	Pos.	Nation	Player
1	GK	MAS	Asyraaf Omar (from Melaka United)
2	DF	MAS	Fauzan Fauzi (from Melaka United)
5	DF	BRA	Yan Victor (from Chungbuk Cheongju)
6	DF	MAS	Tasnim Fitri (from Sarawak United)
7	MF	SEN	Morgaro Gomis (from Clyde)
8	MF	MAS	Khairu Azrin (from Kedah Darul Aman)
9	FW	KGZ	Ernist Batyrkanov (from Abdysh-Ata Kant)
10	FW	PHI	OJ Porteria (from Kirivong Sok Sen Chey)
—	FW	BRA	Devid (from Tirana)
13	DF	MAS	Latiff Suhaimi (from Penang)
16	MF	MAS	Royizzat Daud (from Perak)
17	DF	MAS	Fandi Othman (from Sri Pahang)
21	MF	MAS	S. Sharvin (from Selangor II)
22	MF	MAS	Syazwan Zainon (from Kedah Darul Aman)
23	FW	MAS	Indra Putra Mahayuddin (from Perak)
24	DF	MAS	Hafiy Haikal (from Johor Darul Ta'zim II)
25	GK	MAS	Ilham Amirullah (from Kedah Darul Aman)
27	FW	MAS	Aqil Hilman (from Perak)
28	DF	MAS	Ariff Ar-Rasyid (from Penang)

=== Transfers out ===
Note: Flags indicate national team as defined under FIFA eligibility rules; some limited exceptions apply. Players may hold more than one non-FIFA nationality.

No.	Pos.	Nation	Player
—	MF	MAS	Nik Akif (loan return to Terengganu)
—	FW	NGA	Jacob Njoku (to Sabah)
—	DF	MAS	Aliff Najmi (to PDRM)
—	MF	MAS	Zulkiffli Zakaria (to Harini)
—	MF	MAS	Amirul Shafik (to Kuching City)
—	GK	MAS	Fikri Che Soh (to Kedah Darul Aman)
—	DF	JPN	Shuhei Fukai
—	DF	MAS	Faisal Rosli
—	MF	GHA	Julius Ofori
—	FW	MAS	Khairul Rizam
—	MF	JPN	Masashi Motoyama
—	MF	MAS	Shahrul Hakim
—	GK	MAS	Syafeeq Syamsul
—	MF	MAS	Ailim Fahmi
—	MF	MAS	Aizzat Maidin
—	MF	MAS	Akmal Rizal Suhaimi
—	DF	MAS	Evan Wensley
—	DF	MAS	Umeir Aznan
—	MF	MAS	Famirul Asraf
—	DF	MAS	Syafiq Izzudin
—	MF	MAS	Zufar Akmal
—	GK	MAS	Nor Amin
—	FW	MAS	Fakhrul Zaman
—	FW	MAS	Imran Samso
—	FW	MAS	Akif Afizi
—	GK	MAS	Zulkifli Yusof
—	MF	MAS	Faiz Aqil
—	MF	MAS	Hariz Roslan
—	MF	MAS	Fakhrul Che Ramli
—	MF	MAS	Abdul Halim Ghazali

== Statistics ==
=== Appearances and goals ===
No.	Pos	Nat	Player	Total		League		FA Cup		Malaysia Cup		MFL Challenge Cup	
No.	Pos	Nat	Player	Apps	Goals	Apps	Goals	Apps	Goals	Apps	Goals	Apps	Goals
Goalkeepers
1	GK	(Malaysia) MAS	Asyraaf Omar	9	0	9	0	0	0	0	0	0	0
25	GK	(Malaysia) MAS	Ilham Amirullah	13	0	11	0	1	0	0	0	1	0
29	GK	(Malaysia) MAS	Jason Tew	0	0	0	0	0	0	0	0	0	0
33	GK	(Malaysia) MAS	Shahril Sa'ari	11	0	6	0	0	0	2	0	3	0
Defenders
2	DF	(Malaysia) MAS	Fauzan Fauzi	22	0	17+1	0	1	0	0+1	0	2	0
3	DF	(Malaysia) MAS	Nazri Muhammad	1	0	0	0	0	0	0	0	0+1	0
5	DF	(Brazil) BRA	Yan Victor	16	1	15	1	1	0	0	0	0	0
6	DF	(Malaysia) MAS	Tasnim Fitri	5	0	1+4	0	0	0	0	0	0	0
12	DF	(South Korea) KOR	Deok Kim	10	0	5+1	0	0	0	2	0	1+1	0
13	DF	(Malaysia) MAS	Latiff Suhaimi	28	0	21+2	0	1	0	1	0	3	0
14	DF	(Malaysia) MAS	Hafiy Haikal	16	1	7+7	1	0	0	0+1	0	1	0
17	DF	(Malaysia) MAS	Fandi Othman	28	0	19+3	0	1	0	2	0	3	0
28	DF	(Malaysia) MAS	Ariff Ar-Rasyid	19	0	13+1	0	0+1	0	1	0	3	0
72	DF	(Malaysia) MAS	Azarul Nazarith	12	0	6+1	0	0	0	2	0	2+1	0
77	DF	(Malaysia) MAS	Qayyum Marjoni	12	0	7+2	0	0	0	0+1	0	2	0
Midfielders
4	MF	(Uzbekistan) UZB	Sirozhiddin Rakhmatullaev	15	0	8+1	0	0	0	2	0	3+1	0
7	MF	(Senegal) SEN	Morgaro Gomis	16	1	11+2	0	1	0	0	0	1+1	1
8	MF	(Malaysia) MAS	Khairu Azrin	23	0	14+5	0	0	0	1	0	1+2	0
10	MF	(Philippines) PHI	OJ Porteria	27	7	20+2	6	1	0	1+1	1	1+1	0
11	MF	(Malaysia) MAS	Haziq Subri	3	0	2	0	0+1	0	0	0	0	0
16	MF	(Malaysia) MAS	Royizzat Daud	16	5	1+11	2	0	0	1	0	1+2	3
18	MF	(Croatia) CRO	Dominik Balić	12	2	7+1	1	0	0	1	0	3	1
20	MF	(Malaysia) MAS	Syazwan Solihin	12	0	4+6	0	0	0	0	0	0+2	0
21	MF	(Malaysia) MAS	Sharvin Selvakumaran	27	5	5+15	3	0+1	0	1+1	0	1+3	2
22	MF	(Malaysia) MAS	Syazwan Zainon	24	3	17+3	2	0	0	1+1	0	2	1
23	MF	(Malaysia) MAS	Indra Putra Mahayuddin	30	6	17+7	4	1	0	1+1	1	3	1
26	MF	(Malaysia) MAS	Nik Azli	12	0	5+5	0	0+1	0	0+1	0	0	0
30	MF	(Malaysia) MAS	Asraff Aliffuddin	27	2	7+14	1	1	0	0+2	0	3	1
39	MF	(Malaysia) MAS	Rizuan Muda	1	0	0+1	0	0	0	0	0	0	0
88	MF	(Malaysia) MAS	Faiz Nasir	11	1	4+2	0	0	0	1	0	1+3	1
Forwards
9	FW	(Kyrgyzstan) KGZ	Ernist Batyrkanov	12	0	3+8	0	1	0	0	0	0	0
15	FW	(Brazil) BRA	Gregory	8	0	0+8	0	0	0	0	0	0	0
19	FW	(Brazil) BRA	Devid	15	4	12+2	4	0+1	0	0	0	0	0
24	FW	(Nigeria) NGA	Ismahil Akinade	16	5	10+1	4	0	0	2	0	3	1
27	FW	(Malaysia) MAS	Aqil Hilman	13	0	2+10	0	1	0	0	0	0	0
Players transferred out during the season

Last updated: 16 December 2023
Source: Competitions

== Competitions ==
=== Malaysia Super League ===
Pos	Team	Pld	W	D	L	GF	GA	GD	Pts	Qualification or relegation
10	Penang	26	6	6	14	29	50	−21	24	
11	Perak	26	6	4	16	25	55	−30	22	
12	Kelantan United	26	4	5	17	29	65	−36	17	
13	Kuching City	26	2	6	18	24	51	−27	12	
14	Kelantan (Note: MFL officially snubs Kelantan club licensing approval.)	26	2	2	22	29	121	−92	8	Ejected from Malaysian Super League

Source: MFL
Rules for classification: 1) Points; 2) Goal difference; 3) Number of goals scored.
Notes:

26 February 2023 1	Selangor	1–0	Kelantan United	Petaling Jaya
20:15 MYT	Yazan 40'; Aliff (yellow card) 79'; Danial (yellow card) 90+3'; Ayron (yellow card) 90+4'	Report	Azrin (yellow card) 19'; Latiff (yellow card) 76'	Stadium: Petaling Jaya Stadium; Attendance: 6,701; Referee: Mohammad Zamzaidi Katimin

1 March 2023 2	Sabah	3–1	Kelantan United	Kota Kinabalu
20:15 MYT	Lok 22' (pen.); Park 26'; Saddil (yellow card) 43'; Castanheira 46'; Jaílton Paraíba (yellow card) 51'	Report	Latiff (yellow card) 24'; Victor (yellow card) 45+2'; Indra Putra 90+2'	Stadium: Likas Stadium; Attendance: 12,558; Referee: Tuan Mohd Yaasin Tuan Mohd Hanafiah

4 March 2023 3	Kelantan United	0–0	Perak	Kota Bharu
21:00 UTC+8	Asraff (yellow card) 45+1'; Latiff (yellow card) 90'	Report	Fadhil (yellow card) 34'; Hadi (yellow card) 57'; Shivan (yellow card) 70'	Stadium: Sultan Muhammad IV Stadium; Attendance: 964; Referee: Suhaizi Shukri

13 March 2023 4	Kelantan United	2–3	Kedah Darul Aman	Kota Bharu
21:00 UTC+8	Indra (yellow card) 4'; Devid 21'; Victor 89' (pen.); Asraff (yellow card) 90'	Report	Lira 34'; Hidalgo 44' (pen.); Afiq (yellow card) 72'; Al-Hafiz 89'	Stadium: Sultan Muhammad IV Stadium; Attendance: 1,954; Referee: Fitri Maskon

18 March 2023 5	PDRM	2–0	Kelantan United	Petaling Jaya
17:30 UTC+8	Dzulfahmi 10'; Okwuosa (yellow card) 27'; Agba 38' (pen.)	Report	Asyraaf (yellow card) 37'; Fandi (yellow card) 58'; Aqil (yellow card) 90'	Stadium: Petaling Jaya Stadium; Attendance: 202; Referee: Suhaizi Shukri

31 March 2023 6	Terengganu	2–1	Kelantan United	Kuala Terengganu
22:00 UTC+8	Krasniqi 6'; Mintah 28', (yellow card) 45+3'; Kulmatov (yellow card) 62'	Report	Sharvin (yellow card) 35'; Ariff (yellow card) 37'; Khairu (yellow card) 42'; Porteria 76'	Stadium: Sultan Mizan Zainal Abidin Stadium; Attendance: 4,250; Referee: Muhammad Usaid Jamal

5 April 2023 7	Kuching City	1–1	Kelantan United	Kuching
22:00 UTC+8	Kuziev 52' (pen.); Amirul (yellow card) 87'	Report	Fandi (yellow card) 56'; Asraff 90+4'	Stadium: Sarawak State Stadium; Attendance: 188; Referee: Firdaus Dahlan

10 April 2023 8	Sri Pahang	1–0	Kelantan United	Kuantan
22:00 UTC+8	Brundo 90+3'	Report	Sharvin (yellow card) 73'	Stadium: Darul Makmur Stadium; Attendance: 2,811; Referee: Mohd Fusser Mad Sallih

18 April 2023 9	Penang	2–0	Kelantan United	George Town
22:00 UTC+8	Azmeer (yellow card) 12'; Nik 48'; Vitor 58'; Khairul (yellow card) 80'	Report	Ariff (yellow card) 31'; Fandi (yellow card) 69'	Stadium: City Stadium; Attendance: 1,630; Referee: Suhaizi Shukri

13 May 2023 10	Johor Darul Ta'zim	6–0	Kelantan United	Johor
20:15 UTC+8	Bergson 8', 61', 69' (pen.); Forestieri 22', 90+2'; Endrick (yellow card) 43'; Velázquez 76' (pen.)	Report	Sharvin (yellow card) 73'	Stadium: Sultan Ibrahim Stadium; Attendance: 10,833; Referee: Ahmad Zuhadi Dzulkifli

20 May 2023 11	Kelantan United	1–3	Kuala Kumpur City	Kota Bharu
21:00 UTC+8	Khairu (yellow card) 10'; Fauzan (yellow card) 13'; Devid 34' (pen.)	Report	Saravanan 17'; Sean 23'; Zirdum (yellow card) 44'; Zhafri (yellow card) 45'; Morales (yellow card) 65'; Azri (yellow card) 87'; Josué 90+5' (pen.); Pallraj (yellow card) 90+9'	Stadium: Sultan Muhammad IV Stadium; Attendance: 224; Referee: Fitri Maskon

23 May 2023 12	Negeri Sembilan	3–3	Kelantan United	Seremban
21:00 UTC+8	Shahrel 36'; Annas (yellow card) 56'; Hafiz 71'; Safuwan (yellow card) 82'; Ahmad (yellow card) 89'; Filemon 90+5'	Report	Porteria 15' (yellow card) 35'; Syazwan 32'; Indra Putra 80'	Stadium: Tuanku Abdul Rahman Stadium; Attendance: 1,114; Referee: Ahmad Zuhadi Dzulkifli

2 June 2023 13	Kelantan United	4–1	Kelantan	Kota Bharu
21:00 UTC+8	Devid 21'; Porteria 26', 61'; Latiff (yellow card) 45+3'; Syazwan 66'; Fandi (yellow card) 69'; Hhairu (yellow card) 70'	Report	Afzal (yellow card) 32'; Akinade 45+4' (pen.)	Stadium: Sultan Muhammad IV Stadium; Attendance: 2,910; Referee: Khairulsyahmi Khalidi

7 June 2023 14	Kelantan United	1–7	Selangor	Kota Bharu
21:00 UTC+8	Indra Putra Mahayuddin (yellow card) 9'; Devid 75' (pen.); Sharvin Selvakumaran (yellow card) 84'	Report	Mukhairi Ajmal 4'; Ayron del Valle 10', 45', 79'; Faisal Halim 29'; Yohandry Orozco 51'; Aliff 78'	Stadium: Sultan Muhammad IV Stadium; Attendance: 1,242; Referee: Khirulazuan Kidam

26 June 2023 15	Kelantan United	0–3	Sabah	Kota Bharu
21:00 UTC+8	Yan Victor (yellow card) 88'	Report	Saddil Ramdani 22'; Stuart Wilkin 45+1'; Baddrol Bakhtiar 62' (yellow card) 35'	Stadium: Sultan Muhammad IV Stadium; Attendance: 297; Referee: Nazmi Nasaruddin

7 July 2023 16	Perak	1–1	Kelantan United	Ipoh
21:00 UTC+8	Sunday Afolabi 9'; Alif Zikri (yellow card) 22'	Report	Indra Putra Mahayuddin 84' (pen.); Ismahil Akinade (yellow card) 86'	Stadium: Perak Stadium; Attendance: 2,096; Referee: Jeevanathan M. Ponniamoorthy

14 July 2023 17	Kedah Darul Aman	3–1	Kelantan United	Alor Setar
21:00 UTC+8	Lee Tuck (yellow card) 35'; Ifedayo Olusegun 55', 74'; Amirbek Juraboev 86'	Report	Dominik Balić (yellow card) 11'; Mohamad Fauzan (yellow card) 15'; Sirozhiddin Rakhmatullaev (yellow card) 45+1'; Fandi Othman (yellow card) 73' (yellow-red card) 90+2'; Ismahil Akinade 90+1'	Stadium: Darul Aman Stadium; Attendance: 5,926; Referee: Nazmi Nasaruddin

28 July 2023 18	Kelantan United	2–2	PDRM	Kota Bharu
21:00 UTC+8	OJ Porteria 56'; Sharvin Selvakumaran 71'; Azarul Nazarith (yellow card) 83'; Latiff Suhaimi (yellow card) 90+4'	Report	Kyaw Min Oo (yellow card) 32'; Fadi Awad (yellow card) 45+2'; Nabil Latpi 47'; Uche Agba 54'	Stadium: Sultan Muhammad IV Stadium; Attendance: 540; Referee: Mohammad Faizal Talib

8 August 2023 19	Kelantan United	1–4	Terengganu	Kota Bharu
21:00 UTC+8	Ismahil Akinade (yellow card) 37' (goal) 86'; Khairu Azrin Khazali (yellow card) 83'; Fandi Othman (yellow card) 90+5'	Report	Ivan Mamut 29' (pen.); Arif Fadzilah (yellow card) 35'; Safwan Mazlan (yellow card) 68'; Sony Nordé 72'; Nik Sharif Haseefy 84'; Hakimi Abdullah 90+3'	Stadium: Sultan Muhammad IV Stadium; Attendance: 517; Referee: Abang Azharudin Abdullah

4 September 2023 20 (Rescheduled)	Kelantan United	2–1	Kuching City	Kota Bharu
22:00 UTC+8	Ismahil Akinade 48'; Sirozhiddin Rakhmatullaev (yellow card) 52'; OJ Porteria 56'	Report	Yuki Tanigawa (yellow card) 39'; Abu Kamara 42'; Nuriddin Davronov (yellow card) 44'; Bruno Dybal (yellow card) 87'	Stadium: Sultan Muhammad IV Stadium; Referee: Nafeez Wahab

27 August 2023 21	Kelantan United	1–5	Sri Pahang	Kota Bharu
21:00 UTC+8	Latiff Suhaimi (yellow card) 48'; Royizzat Daud 77'	Report	Azrif Nasrulhaq 10' (yellow card) 34'; Ezequiel Agüero 23', 27'; Kevin Ingreso (yellow card) 39'; Fadhli Shas (yellow card) 44'; Kpah Sherman 66'; David Rowley 90+2'	Stadium: Sultan Muhammad IV Stadium; Attendance: 168; Referee: Fitri Maskon

1 October 2023 22	Kelantan United	1–0	Penang	Kota Bharu
21:00 UTC+8	Dominik Balić 67' (yellow card) 87'	Report	Faris Shah Rosli (yellow card) 61'	Stadium: Sultan Muhammad IV Stadium; Attendance: 351; Referee: Shukor Zulkiflee

29 October 2023 23	Kelantan United	0–2	Johor Darul Ta'zim	Kota Bharu
22:00 UTC+8	Dominik Balić (yellow card) 61'; Qayyum Marjoni (yellow card) 64'; Fandi Othman (yellow card) 90'	Report	Syahmi Safari (yellow card) 52'; Fernando Forestieri 75'; Bergson Da Silva 90'	Stadium: Sultan Muhammad IV Stadium; Attendance: 697; Referee: Khairulsyahmi Ahmad

26 November 2023 24	Kuala Lumpur City	3–0	Kelantan United	Cheras
21:00 UTC+8	Matko Zirdum 21'; Paulo Josué 68'; Kipré Tchétché 78'; Saravanan Thirumurugan (yellow card) 90'	Report		Stadium: Kuala Lumpur Stadium; Attendance: 397; Referee: S. Logeswaran

1 December 2023 25	Kelantan United	0–4	Negeri Sembilan	Kota Bharu
21:00 UTC+8	Qayyum Marjoni (yellow card) 51'; Ariff Ar-Rasyid (red card) 77'	Report	Hérold Goulon 16'; Mohamad Hasbullah 25'; Barathkumar Ramaloo 42', 66'; Zainal Abidin Jamil (yellow card) 61'; Tommy Mawat Bada (yellow card) 85'	Stadium: Sultan Muhammad IV Stadium; Attendance: 73; Referee: Faizudin Ismail

17 December 2023 26	Kelantan	2–6	Kelantan United	Kota Bharu
21:00 UTC+8	Afif Jazimin 13', 25' (pen.); Alif Ezzahan Zulkifli (yellow card) 45+2'; Saranraj Kala Arasu (yellow card) 69'; Leonardo Rolón (yellow card) 90+3'	Report	Hafiy Haikal 29'; Sharvin Selvakumaran 49', 75'; Ismahil Akinade 60'; Fandi Othman (yellow card) 89'; Royizzat Daud 90+2'; Indra Putra Mahayuddin 90+4'	Stadium: Sultan Muhammad IV Stadium; Attendance: 315; Referee: Mohd Nafeez Abd Wahab

=== Malaysia FA Cup ===
15 April 2023 Round of 16	Sabah	2–0	Kelantan United	Kota Kinabalu
21:15 UTC+8	Baddrol 13'; Stuart 59'	Report		Stadium: Likas Stadium; Attendance: 4,500; Referee: S. Logeswaran

=== Malaysia Cup ===
==== Round of 16 ====
5 August 2023 R16 1st Leg	Kelantan United	0–1	Negeri Sembilan	Kota Bharu
17:30 UTC+8	Ariff Ar-Rasyid (yellow card) 25'	Report	Sean Selvaraj 29'; Herold Goulon (yellow card) 36'	Stadium: Sultan Muhammad IV Stadium; Attendance: 194; Referee: Suhaizi Shukri

20 August 2023 R16 2nd Leg	Negeri Sembilan	4–2 (5–2 agg.)	Kelantan United	Seremban
21:00 UTC+8	Casagrande 7'; Barathkumar Ramaloo 19'; Tommy Mawat Bada (yellow card) 32'; Hein Htet Aung 34'; Nasrullah Haniff (yellow card) 64'; Youssef Ezzejjari 87' (pen.)	Report	OJ Porteria 3'; Indra Putra Mahayuddin 66' (pen.); Syazwan Zainon (yellow card) 72'	Stadium: Tuanku Abdul Rahman Stadium; Attendance: 805; Referee: Kamil Zakaria

Negeri Sembilan won 5–2 on aggregate.

=== MFL Challenge Cup ===
==== Quarter-finals ====
18 September 2023 QF 1st Leg	Kelantan United	7–0	Kelantan	Kota Bharu
21:00 UTC+8	Dominik Balić 9'; Ismahil Akinade 20'; Indra Putra Mahayuddin 59'; Faiz Nasir 74'; Sharvin Selvakumaran 79'; Royizzat Daud 88', 90'	Report	Syaqimi Rozi (yellow card) 52'	Stadium: Sultan Muhammad IV Stadium; Attendance: 710; Referee: Munir Izam

4 October 2023 QF 2nd Leg	Kelantan	0–4 (0–11 agg.)	Kelantan United	Kota Bharu
20:15 UTC+8	Mohamad Kamel (yellow card) 23'; Yusri Yuhasmadi (yellow card) 38'	Report	Syazwan Zainon 25'; Royizzat Daud (yellow card) 45' (goal) 69'; Morgaro Gomis 60'; Sharvin Selvakumaran 72'	Stadium: Sultan Muhammad IV Stadium; Attendance: 275; Referee: Faizal Ridzuan

Kelantan United won 11–0 on aggregate.

==== Semi-finals ====
22 October 2023 SF 1st Leg	Kuching City	1–1	Kelantan United	Kuching
20:15 UTC+8	Bruno Dybal 10'; Jimmy Raymond (yellow card) 70'	Report	Indra Putra Mahayuddin (yellow card) 24'; Asraff Aliffuddin 42' (yellow card) 51'; Sirozhiddin Rakhmatullaev (yellow card) 89'	Stadium: Sarawak State Stadium; Attendance: 655; Referee: Nafeez Abd Wahab

4 November 2023 SF 2nd Leg	Kelantan United	0–2 (1–3 agg.)	Kuching City	Kota Bharu
16:45 UTC+8	Latiff Suhaimi (yellow card) 83'	Report	Alif Hassan (yellow card) 8'; Abu Kamara 40'; Bruno Dybal 63'	Stadium: Sultan Muhammad IV Stadium; Attendance: 862; Referee: Suhaizi Shukri

Kuching City won 3–1 on aggregate.
