= 2022 Kelantan United F.C. season =

Kelantan United
2022 season
- President: Rozi Muhamad
- Head coach: Syamsul Saad
- Stadium: Sultan Muhammad IV Stadium
- Malaysia Super League: 5th
- Malaysia FA Cup: Second round
- Malaysia Cup: Round of 16
- Top goalscorer: League: Jacob Njoku (8); All: Jacob Njoku (10)
Home colours	Away colours	Third colours

The 2022 season was the seventh season in the existence of Kelantan United Football Club. The participated in Malaysia Premier League, Malaysia FA Cup and Malaysia Cup.

== Coaching staff ==
Position	Staff
Head coach	(Malaysia) Syamsul Saad
Assistant head coach	(Malaysia) Sazami Shafi'i
Assistant coach	(Malaysia) Khairan Eroza Razali
Goalkeeping coach	(Malaysia) Chawalit Wuttikhet
Fitness coach	(Malaysia) Mohd Hafezi Mat Zain

== Players ==
=== First-team squad ===
As of 12 January 2021

Note: Flags indicate national team as defined under FIFA eligibility rules; some limited exceptions apply. Players may hold more than one non-FIFA nationality.

No.	Pos.	Nation	Player
1	GK	(Malaysia) MAS	Muhammad Nor Amin
3	DF	(Malaysia) MAS	Evan Wensley
4	DF	(Japan) JPN	Shuhei Fukai (third-captain)
5	DF	(Malaysia) MAS	Aliff Najmi
6	DF	(Malaysia) MAS	Aizzat Maidin
7	FW	(Malaysia) MAS	Fakhrul Zaman
8	MF	(Malaysia) MAS	Shahrul Hakim
9	FW	(Nigeria) NGA	Jacob Njoku
10	MF	(Japan) JPN	Masashi Motoyama (vice-captain)
11	FW	(Malaysia) MAS	Khairul Rizam
13	GK	(Malaysia) MAS	Syafeeq Syamsul
14	DF	(Malaysia) MAS	Faisal Rosli (captain)
15	MF	(Malaysia) MAS	Ailim Fahmi
16	MF	(Malaysia) MAS	Nik Akif (on loan from Terengganu)
19	MF	(Malaysia) MAS	Imran Samso
20	FW	(Malaysia) MAS	Asraff Aliffuddin
21	DF	(Malaysia) MAS	Umeir Aznan

No.	Pos.	Nation	Player
22	MF	(Malaysia) MAS	Zulkiffli Zakaria
23	MF	(Malaysia) MAS	Famirul Asraf
25	MF	(Ghana) GHA	Julius Ofori
26	FW	(Malaysia) MAS	Nik Azli
27	DF	(Malaysia) MAS	Akmal Rizal Suhaimi
28	MF	(Malaysia) MAS	Amirul Shafik
29	MF	(Malaysia) MAS	Zufar Akmal
30	DF	(Malaysia) MAS	Nazri Muhammad
33	GK	(Malaysia) MAS	Fikri Che Soh
36	FW	(Malaysia) MAS	Akif Afizi
37	GK	(Malaysia) MAS	Zulkifli Yusof
38	MF	(Malaysia) MAS	Faiz Aqil
39	MF	(Malaysia) MAS	Hariz Roslan
41	MF	(Malaysia) MAS	Fakhrul Che Ramli
42	MF	(Malaysia) MAS	Abdul Halim Ghazali
69	MF	(Malaysia) MAS	Haziq Subri
77	DF	(Malaysia) MAS	Syafiq Izzudin

=== Transfers in ===
Note: Flags indicate national team as defined under FIFA eligibility rules; some limited exceptions apply. Players may hold more than one non-FIFA nationality.

No.	Pos.	Nation	Player
—	MF	(Ghana) GHA	Amidu Salifu (from Petrolul Ploiești, transferred out during season)
3	DF	(Malaysia) MAS	Evan Wensley (from Sabah, previously on loan)
9	FW	(Nigeria) NGA	Jacob Njoku
14	DF	(Malaysia) MAS	Faisal Rosli (from Sri Pahang)
16	MF	(Malaysia) MAS	Nik Akif (on loan from Terengganu)
22	MF	(Malaysia) MAS	Zulkiffli Zakaria (from Perak)
25	MF	(Ghana) GHA	Julius Ofori (from Energetik-BGU Minsk)

=== Transfers out ===
Note: Flags indicate national team as defined under FIFA eligibility rules; some limited exceptions apply. Players may hold more than one non-FIFA nationality.

No.	Pos.	Nation	Player
—	MF	(Malaysia) MAS	Ariusdius Jais (loan return to Sabah)

== Statistics ==
=== Appearances and goals ===
No.	Pos	Nat	Player	Total		League		FA Cup		Malaysia Cup	
No.	Pos	Nat	Player	Apps	Goals	Apps	Goals	Apps	Goals	Apps	Goals
Goalkeepers
1	GK	(Malaysia) MAS	Muhamad Nor Amin	1	0	1	0	0	0	0	0
33	GK	(Malaysia) MAS	Fikri Che Soh	21	0	17	0	2	0	2	0
Defenders
3	DF	(Malaysia) MAS	Evan Wensley	14	0	8+3	0	1+1	0	1	0
4	DF	(Japan) JPN	Shuhei Fukai	22	0	18	0	2	0	2	0
5	DF	(Malaysia) MAS	Aliff Najmi	19	1	15	1	2	0	2	0
6	DF	(Malaysia) MAS	Aizzat Maidin	13	0	8+3	0	0+1	0	0+1	0
14	DF	(Malaysia) MAS	Faisal Rosli	16	0	13	0	2	0	1	0
21	DF	(Malaysia) MAS	Umeir Aznan	3	0	2+1	0	0	0	0	0
30	DF	(Malaysia) MAS	Nazri Muhammad	6	0	4	0	0	0	2	0
77	DF	(Malaysia) MAS	Syafiq Izuddin	7	0	1+5	0	0	0	0+1	0
Midfielders
8	MF	(Malaysia) MAS	Shahrul Hakim	8	0	4+3	0	0+1	0	0	0
10	MF	(Japan) JPN	Masashi Motoyama	14	0	13	0	0+1	0	0	0
15	MF	(Malaysia) MAS	Ailim Fahmi	1	0	0	0	0	0	1	0
16	MF	(Malaysia) MAS	Nik Akif	9	0	7+1	0	0	0	1	0
17	MF	(Ghana) GHA	Amidu Salifu	7	1	5	0	2	1	0	0
19	MF	(Malaysia) MAS	Imran Samso	12	0	9+1	0	2	0	0	0
22	MF	(Malaysia) MAS	Zulkiffli Zakaria	10	0	4+3	0	1+1	0	0+1	0
23	MF	(Malaysia) MAS	Famirul Asraf	14	0	4+7	0	1+1	0	1	0
25	MF	(Ghana) GHA	Julius Ofori	6	3	5	3	0	0	1	0
28	MF	(Malaysia) MAS	Amirul Shafik	21	5	17	5	1+1	0	2	0
29	MF	(Malaysia) MAS	Zufar Akmal	1	0	0+1	0	0	0	0	0
38	MF	(Malaysia) MAS	Faiz Aqil	4	0	0+4	0	0	0	0	0
39	MF	(Malaysia) MAS	Hariz Roslan	1	0	0+1	0	0	0	0	0
40	MF	(Malaysia) MAS	Idham Mohamad	1	0	0+1	0	0	0	0	0
41	MF	(Malaysia) MAS	Fakhrul Che Ramli	3	0	1	0	0	0	0+2	0
42	MF	(Malaysia) MAS	Halim Ghazali	1	0	0+1	0	0	0	0	0
69	MF	(Malaysia) MAS	Haziq Subri	12	2	8+1	1	1	1	1+1	0
Forwards
7	FW	(Malaysia) MAS	Fakhrul Zaman	6	1	3+2	1	1	0	0	0
9	FW	(Nigeria) NGA	Jacob Njoku	18	10	14+1	8	2	2	1	0
11	FW	(Malaysia) MAS	Khairul Rizam	16	1	10+3	1	1	0	1+1	0
20	FW	(Malaysia) MAS	Asraff Aliffuddin	21	5	6+11	4	1+1	1	1+1	0
26	FW	(Malaysia) MAS	Nik Azli	10	0	3+4	0	0+1	0	2	0
36	FW	(Malaysia) MAS	Akif Afizi	9	0	0+8	0	0+1	0	0	0
Players transferred out during the season

Last updated: 30 September 2022
Source: Competitions

== Competitions ==
=== Malaysia Super League ===
Pos	Team	Pld	W	D	L	GF	GA	GD	Pts	Qualification or relegation
3	Kuching City	18	10	4	4	30	20	+10	34	Promotion to Super League and Qualification to Malaysia Cup
4	Terengganu II (Note: Johor Darul Ta'zim II, Selangor II, and Terengganu II aren't eligible to promote as their parent clubs (Johor Darul Ta'zim, Selangor, and Terengganu) play in the Super League. These feeder teams can only play in leagues below their parents'. They also can't play in the Malaysian Cup as they're only eligible to play in the Malaysian Cup if their parents fail to do so (which is not possible currently).)	18	10	3	5	29	18	+11	33	Relocated to MFL Cup
5	Kelantan United	18	6	7	5	23	19	+4	25	Promotion to Super League and Qualification to Malaysia Cup
6	PDRM	18	6	3	9	20	28	−8	21	Promotion to Super League and Qualification to Malaysia Cup
7	UiTM (D)	18	6	2	10	18	25	−7	20	Withdrawn from Liga Super and relegated to Al-ikhsan Cup (Note: UiTM FC withdrew from Liga Super before the start of 2023 season.)

Updated to match(es) played on 4 September 2022. Source: MFL
Rules for classification: 1) Points; 2) Goal difference; 3) Number of goals scored.
(D) Disqualified
Notes:

15 August 2022 1	Kelantan United	3—1	UiTM

18 March 2022 2	Johor Darul Ta'zim II	2—0	Kelantan United

27 March 2022 3	PDRM	0—1	Kelantan United

13 April 2022 4	FAM-MSN Project	1—2	Kelantan United

16 April 2022 5	Terengganu II	1—0	Kelantan United

23 April 2022 6	UiTM	1—2	Kelantan United

27 April 2022 7	Perak	2—3	Kelantan United

9 May 2022 8	Selangor 2	1—1	Kelantan United

20 May 2022 9	Kelantan United	0—0	Kuching City

27 May 2022 10	Kelantan	0—0	Kelantan United

25 June 2022 11	Kelantan United	0—1	Perak

16 July 2022 12	Kelantan United	1—1	PDRM

27 July 2022 13	Kelantan United	1—1	FAM-MSN Project

3 August 2022 14	Kelantan United	1—1	Johor Darul Ta'zim II

8 August 2022 15	Kelantan United	2—3	Terengganu II

19 August 2022 16	Kelantan United	4—0	Selangor 2

4 September 2022 17	Kuching City	2—1	Kelantan United

30 September 2022 18	Kelantan United	1—1	Kelantan

=== Malaysia FA Cup ===
11 March 2022 First round	Kelantan United	4–0	Kinabalu Jaguar

13 May 2022 Second round	Sabah	2–1	Kelantan United

=== Malaysia Cup ===
Round of 16

26 October 2022 First leg	Kelantan United	0–2	Selangor

1 November 2022 Second leg	Selangor	1–0 (3–0 agg.)	Kelantan United
