= 2023 Kuching City F.C. season =

Kuching City
2023 season
- Chairman: Fazzrudin Abdul Rahman
- CEO: Iswandi Ali Hassan
- Head coach: (Singapore) Aidil Sharin Sahak
- Stadium: Sarawak Stadium
- Malaysia Super League: 13th
- Malaysia FA Cup: Second Round
- Malaysia Cup: Round of 16
- MFL Challenge Cup: Runner-up
- Top goalscorer: League: Abu Kamara (13 goals); All: Abu Kamara (16 goals)
- Average home league attendance: 2,423

The 2023 season was Kuching City's eighth year in existence and their first season in the top flight. The club are participating in the Malaysia Super League, the Malaysia FA Cup, the Malaysia Cup and the MFL Challenge Cup.

The club won 2–1 over Kelantan in their first 2023 Malaysia Super League match.

== Coaching staff ==
- Head coach: Aidil Sharin Sahak
- Assistant head coach: Firdaus Morshidi
- Assistant coach: Zulkarnien Mohd Poasa
- Goalkeeper coach: Mohd Azley Abdullah

== Players ==
=== First-team squad ===
As of 25 February 2023

Note: Flags indicate national team as defined under FIFA eligibility rules; some limited exceptions apply. Players may hold more than one non-FIFA nationality.

No.	Pos.	Nation	Player
1	GK	MAS	Andy Nicholas
2	DF	MAS	Jimmy Raymond
5	DF	BRA	Célio Santos
6	MF	TJK	Nuriddin Davronov
7	FW	LBR	Abu Kamara
8	MF	MAS	Joseph Kalang Tie
9	MF	MAS	Adam Shreen
10	MF	NAM	Petrus Shitembi
11	MF	MAS	Hafis Saperi
12	DF	MAS	Ramesh Lai
13	DF	MAS	Dzulazlan Ibrahim
14	MF	MAS	Amir Amri
17	MF	MAS	Rafiezan Razali
18	MF	MAS	Amirul Shafik
19	MF	MAS	Irwan Syazmin
20	GK	MAS	Shaiful Wazizi
22	MF	MAS	Zahrul Nizwan
25	MF	MAS	Azriddin Rosli

No.	Pos.	Nation	Player
28	MF	MAS	Faiz Wan Sulaiman
29	DF	MAS	Arham Khussyairi
31	DF	MAS	Badrul Affendy
32	DF	SRB	Mihailo Jovanović
33	DF	BRA	Aylton Alemão
37	GK	MAS	Wan Azraie
38	MF	BRA	Bruno Dybal
40	DF	MAS	Iskandar Shah
41	DF	MAS	Aiman Joanny
44	MF	MAS	Alif Hassan (captain)
50	MF	MAS	Diego Baggio
64	DF	MAS	Badrul Hisham
77	MF	JPN	Yuki Tanigawa
79	MF	CIV	Dechi Marcel N'Guessan
89	DF	MAS	Mazwandi Zekeria
90	FW	TLS	Pedro Henrique
95	FW	MAS	Rahim Razak
99	FW	MAS	Nurshamil Abd Ghani

== Transfers ==
=== Transfers in ===
Preseason

Position	Player	Transferred To	Team	Ref
GK	(Philippines) (England) Julian Schwarzer	(Philippines) Azkals DT	First Team	Free
GK	(Malaysia) Norazlan Razali	(Malaysia) Melaka United	First Team	Free
DF	(Brazil) Célio Santos	(Thailand) Kasetsart	First Team	Free
DF	(Serbia) Mihailo Jovanović	(Uzbekistan) Dinamo Samarqand	First Team	Free
DF	(Malaysia) Qayyum Marjoni	(Malaysia) PIB	First Team	Free
DF	(Malaysia) Arham Khussyairi	(Malaysia) UiTM	First Team	Free
DF	(Malaysia) Badrul Afendy	(Malaysia) Sabah	First Team	Free
MF	(Uzbekistan) Sirojiddin Kuziev	(Uzbekistan) Neftchi Fergana	First Team	Free
MF	(Malaysia) Amirul Shafik	(Malaysia) Kelantan United	First Team	Free
MF	(Malaysia) Zahrul Nizwan	(Malaysia) Sarawak United	First Team	Free
MF	(Malaysia) Azriddin Rosli	(Malaysia) UiTM	First Team	Free
FW	(Burundi) Sudi Abdallah	(Bangladesh) Muktijoddha Sangsad	First Team	Free

Mid-season

Position	Player	Transferred To	Team	Ref
MF	(Ivory Coast) Dechi Marcel N'Guessan	(Malaysia) Kedah Darul Aman F.C.	First Team	Free
MF	(Namibia) Petrus Shitembi	(Malaysia) Terengganu FC	First Team	Free
MF	(Tajikistan) Nuriddin Davronov	(India) Real Kashmir FC	First Team	Free
MF	(Brazil) Bruno Dybal	(Indonesia) Persikabo 1973	First Team	Free
FW	(Timor-Leste) Pedro Henrique	(Indonesia) Persikabo 1973	First Team	Free
GK	(Malaysia) Wan Azraie	PIB	First Team	Free
FW	(Malaysia) Rahim Razak	Sarawak United	First Team	Free
FW	(Malaysia) Nurshamil Abd Ghani	Kelantan	First Team	Free

=== Transfer Out ===
Preseason

Position	Player	Transferred To	Team	Ref
DF	(Malaysia) Sahran Abdul Samad		First Team	Free
DF	(Malaysia) Izray Iffarul Roslan		First Team	Free
DF	(Malaysia) Che Mat Arif		First Team	Free
DF	(Malaysia) Nazrul Abdul Samad		First Team	Free
MF	(Brazil) Gabryel	(Vietnam) SHB Da Nang	First Team	Free
MF	(Malaysia) Hidhir Idris	(Malaysia) Kedah Darul Aman F.C.	First Team	Loan Return
MF	(Brazil) Gabryel	(Austria) Schwarz-Weiß Bregenz	First Team	Free
MF	(Guyana) Keanu Marsh-Brown	(Finland) FF Jaro	First Team	Free
MF	(Malaysia) Rafiq Shah		First Team	Free
MF	(Malaysia) Zainuddin Bohri		First Team	Free
MF	(Malaysia) Hafiz Abu Bakar		First Team	Free
MF	(Malaysia) Samsu Alam Samad		First Team	Free
FW	(Malaysia) Amirrul Iqmal		First Team	Free
FW	(Malaysia) Wan Badzreen		First Team	Free

Mid-season

Position	Player	Transferred To	Team	Ref
GK	(Philippines) (England) Julian Schwarzer	(Indonesia) Arema F.C.	First Team	Free
MF	(Uzbekistan) Sirojiddin Kuziev	PFK Metallurg Bekabad	First Team	Free
FW	(Burundi) Sudi Abdallah	Alittihad Misurata SC	First Team	Free
FW	(Nigeria) Michael Ijezie		First Team	Free
GK	(Malaysia) Norazlan Razali		First Team	Free
DF	(Malaysia) Qayyum Marjoni	Kelantan United	First Team	Free

== Pre-season and friendlies ==
2 February 2023 Friendly	Nagaworld (Cambodia)	2–0	(Malaysia) Kuching City	Kampong Speu
				Stadium: Kampong Speu Stadium

3 February 2023 Friendly	ISI Dangkor Senchey (Cambodia)	0–2	(Malaysia) Kuching City	Phnom Penh
				Stadium: AIA Stadium

4 February 2023 Friendly	Phnom Penh Crown (Cambodia)	2–2	(Malaysia) Kuching City	Phnom Penh
				Stadium: Smart RSN Stadium

5 February 2023 Friendly	Visakha (Cambodia)	3–0	(Malaysia) Kuching City	Phnom Penh
				Stadium: AIA Stadium

12 February 2023 Friendly	Kuching City (Malaysia)	0–3	(Malaysia) Sri Pahang	Sarawak
				Stadium: Sarawak State Stadium

13 February 2023 Friendly	Sri Pahang (Malaysia)	1–0	(Malaysia) Kuching City	Sarawak
				Stadium: Sarawak State Stadium

== Competitions ==
=== Overall record ===
Competition	First match	Last match	Starting round	Final position	Record							
Competition	First match	Last match	Starting round	Final position	Pld	W	D	L	GF	GA	GD	Win %
Malaysia Super League	25 February 2023	17 December 2023	Matchday 1	13th	26	2	6	18	24	51	−27	7.69
Malaysia FA Cup	15 April 2023		Round of 16	Round of 16	1	0	0	1	0	4	−4	0.00
Malaysia Cup	5 August 2023	19 August 2023	Round of 16	Round of 16	2	0	1	1	1	4	−3	0.00
MFL Challenge Cup	19 September 2023	3 December 2023	Quarter-finals	Runners-up	6	3	2	1	8	5	+3	50.00
Total					35	5	9	21	33	64	−31	14.29

Source: Competitions

=== Malaysia Super League ===
25 February 2023 1	Kelantan	1–2	Kuching City	Kota Bharu
	Cifu 51'; Marong (yellow card) 45'; Gerald (yellow card) 90+5'	Report	Célio Santos (yellow card) 45'; Abdallah 58'; Kamara 71'; Adam (yellow card) 76'	Stadium: Sultan Muhammad IV Stadium; Attendance: 5,138; Referee: Ahmad Zuhaidi Dzulkifli

2 March 2023 2	Kuching City	0–5	Selangor	Kuching
	Adam (yellow card) 29'	Report	Noor 4', 48'; Ayron 9'; Gan 65'; Danial 73'; Sharul (yellow card) 84'	Stadium: Sarawak State Stadium; Attendance: 18,000; Referee: Noor Azriel Baharudin

6 March 2023 3	Kuching City	1–2	Sabah	Kuching
	Badrul (yellow card) 5'; Kamara 45+2', (yellow card) 48'	Report	Saddil 24'; Park (yellow card) 44'; Castanheira 58'	Stadium: Sarawak State Stadium; Attendance: 2,500; Referee: Ahmad Zuhaidi Dzulkifli

12 March 2023 4	Perak	2–0	Kuching City	Ipoh
21:00 UTC+8	Seo 42', 57'; Shivan (yellow card) 62'	Report	Alif (yellow card) 62'	Stadium: Perak Stadium; Attendance: 3,817; Referee: Mohd Fusser Mad Sallih

17 March 2023 5	Kedah Darul Aman	3–0	Kuching City	Alor Setar
21:00 UTC+08:00	Zahir 28' 49'; Hidalgo 58'	Report		Stadium: Darul Aman Stadium; Attendance: 7,662; Referee: Zamzaidi Katimin

1 April 2023 6	Kuching City	0–1	PDRM	Kuching
21:15 UTC+8	Dzulazlan (yellow card) 35'; Amirul (yellow card) 83'	Report	Safiee (yellow card) 29'; Norfiqrie (yellow card) 55'; Suzuki 73'; Aliff (yellow card) 81'; Willfred (yellow card) 83'	Stadium: Sarawak State Stadium; Attendance: 292; Referee: Mohd Syukri Azeman

5 April 2023 7	Kuching City	1–1	Kelantan United	Kuching
22:00 UTC+8	Kuziev 52' (pen.); Amirul (yellow card) 87'	Report	Fandi (yellow card) 56'; Asraff 90+4'	Stadium: Sarawak State Stadium; Attendance: 188; Referee: Firdaus Dahlan

9 April 2023 8	Terengganu	2–0	Kuching City	Kuala Terengganu
22:00 UTC+8	Mintah 22', 53'; Shahrul (yellow card) 85'	Report	Kuziyev (yellow card) 29'; Hidhir (yellow card) 89'	Stadium: Sultan Mizan Zainal Abidin Stadium; Attendance: 3,584; Referee: Muhammad Khairulsyahmi Ahmad Khalidi

18 April 2023 9	Kuching City	0–1	Sri Pahang
		Report

27 April 2023 10	Penang	2–1	Kuching City
		Report

19 May 2023 11	Kuching City	0–4	Johor Darul Ta'zim
		Report

24 May 2023 12	Kuala Lumpur City	1–1	Kuching City
		Report

4 June 2023 13	Kuching City	1–1	Negeri Sembilan
		Report

3 July 2023 14	Selangor	2–1	Kuching City
		Report

8 July 2023 15	Sabah	4–3	Kuching City
		Report

16 July 2023 16	Kuching City	1–2	Perak
		Report

21 July 2023 17	Kuching City	2–2	Kelantan
		Report

29 July 2023 18	Kuching City	0–1	Kedah Darul Aman
		Report

26 August 2023 19	Kuching City	0–2	Terengganu
		Report

4 September 2023 20	Kelantan Darul Naim	2–1	Kuching City
		Report

30 September 2023 21	Sri Pahang	3–2	Kuching City
		Report

8 October 2023 22	PDRM	1–1	Kuching City
		Report

28 October 2023 23	Kuching City	0–0	Penang
		Report

23 November 2023 24	Johor Darul Ta'zim	2–0	Kuching City
		Report

10 December 2023 25	Kuching City	2–3	Kuala Lumpur City
		Report

17 December 2023 26	Negeri Sembilan	1–4	Kuching City
		Report

Pos	Team	Pld	W	D	L	GF	GA	GD	Pts	Qualification or relegation
10	Penang	26	6	6	14	29	50	−21	24	
11	Perak	26	6	4	16	25	55	−30	22	
12	Kelantan United	26	4	5	17	29	65	−36	17	
13	Kuching City	26	2	6	18	24	51	−27	12	
14	Kelantan (Note: MFL officially snubs Kelantan club licensing approval.)	26	2	2	22	29	121	−92	8	Ejected from Malaysian Super League

Source: MFL
Rules for classification: 1) Points; 2) Goal difference; 3) Number of goals scored.

=== Malaysia FA Cup ===
15 April 2023 Second round	Kuching City	0–4	Penang
		Report

=== Malaysia Cup ===
Round of 16

5 August 2023 First leg	Kuching City	0–3	Sabah
		Report

19 August 2023 Second leg	Sabah	1–1 (4–1 agg.)	Kuching City
		Report

=== MFL Challenge Cup ===
Quarter-finals

19 September 2023 First leg	Kuching City	1–0	Kedah Darul Aman
		Report

4 October 2023 Second leg	Kedah Darul Aman	0–3 (0–4 agg.)	Kuching City
		Report

Semi-finals

22 October 2023 First leg	Kuching City	1–1	Kelantan Darul Naim
		Report

4 November 2023 Second round	Kelantan Darul Naim	0–2 (1–3 agg.)	Kuching City
		Report

Final

29 November 2023 First leg	PDRM	3–0	Kuching City
		Report

3 December 2023 Second leg	Kuching City	1–1 (1–4 agg.)	PDRM
		Report

== Squad statistics ==
=== Appearances and goals ===
- Players listed with no appearances have been in the matchday squad but only as unused substitutes.

No.	Pos	Nat	Player	Total		League		FA Cup		Malaysia Cup		Challenge Cup	
No.	Pos	Nat	Player	Apps	Goals	Apps	Goals	Apps	Goals	Apps	Goals	Apps	Goals
Goalkeepers
20	GK	(Malaysia) MAS	Shaiful Wazizi	13	0	10+1	0	0	0	2	0	0	0
21	GK	(Malaysia) MAS	Norazlan Razali	5	0	5	0	0	0	0	0	0	0
37	GK	(Malaysia) MAS	Wan Azraie	13	0	6	0	1	0	0	0	6	0
Defenders
2	DF	(Malaysia) MAS	Jimmy Raymond	26	0	17+1	0	0	0	2	0	6	0
5	DF	(Brazil) BRA	Célio Santos	14	0	11+2	0	0	0	1	0	0	0
12	DF	(Malaysia) MAS	Rames Lai	28	1	15+7	0	1	0	2	1	1+2	0
13	DF	(Malaysia) MAS	Dzulazlan Ibrahim	10	0	4+4	0	0	0	0	0	0+2	0
23	DF	(Malaysia) MAS	Qayyum Marjoni	5	0	5	0	0	0	0	0	0	0
31	DF	(Malaysia) MAS	Badrul Afendy	10	0	6+3	0	1	0	0	0	0	0
32	DF	(Serbia) SRB	Mihailo Jovanović	18	0	14+1	0	0	0	2	0	1	0
33	DF	(Brazil) BRA	Aylton Alemão	23	0	17+1	0	1	0	0	0	3+1	0
40	DF	(Malaysia) MAS	Iskandar Shah	11	0	3+3	0	0	0	1	0	1+3	0
41	DF	(Malaysia) MAS	Aiman Joanny	11	0	4+1	0	0	0	0+1	0	5	0
64	DF	(Malaysia) MAS	Badrul Hisham	3	0	1+2	0	0	0	0	0	0	0
Midfielders
6	MF	(Tajikistan) TJK	Nuriddin Davronov	8	0	4+1	0	0	0	0	0	1+2	0
8	MF	(Malaysia) MAS	Joseph Kalang Tie	7	0	1+6	0	0	0	0	0	0	0
9	MF	(Malaysia) MAS	Adam Shreen	13	0	10+2	0	0+1	0	0	0	0	0
10	MF	(Namibia) NAM	Petrus Shitembi	13	1	7	0	0	0	0	0	6	1
11	MF	(Malaysia) MAS	Hidhir Idris	11	0	6+4	0	0	0	1	0	0	0
14	MF	(Malaysia) MAS	Amir Amri	27	2	9+9	2	0+1	0	2	0	4+2	0
17	MF	(Malaysia) MAS	Rafiezan Razali	3	0	0+2	0	1	0	0	0	0	0
18	MF	(Malaysia) MAS	Amirul Shafik	15	0	6+7	0	0	0	0	0	1+1	0
22	MF	(Malaysia) MAS	Zahrul Nizwan	30	1	9+13	1	1	0	1	0	0+6	0
25	MF	(Malaysia) MAS	Azriddin Rosli	5	0	3+2	0	0	0	0	0	0	0
28	MF	(Malaysia) MAS	Wan Faiz	11	0	5+5	0	1	0	0	0	0	0
29	MF	(Malaysia) MAS	Arham Khussyairi	17	0	9+2	0	1	0	0	0	3+2	0
38	MF	(Brazil) BRA	Bruno Dybal	11	4	4+2	2	0	0	0	0	3+2	2
42	MF	(Malaysia) MAS	Abang Azri Fikri	1	0	1	0	0	0	0	0	0	0
43	MF	(Malaysia) MAS	Alauddin Farid Atan	2	0	0+2	0	0	0	0	0	0	0
44	MF	(Malaysia) MAS	Alif Hassan	31	0	17+6	0	0+1	0	2	0	5	0
45	MF	(Malaysia) MAS	Azuanie Jasman	1	0	0+1	0	0	0	0	0	0	0
50	MF	(Malaysia) MAS	Diego Baggio	17	0	5+7	0	0	0	0+1	0	2+2	0
77	MF	(Japan) JPN	Yuki Tanigawa	33	2	23+1	2	1	0	2	0	6	0
79	MF	(Ivory Coast) CIV	Dechi Marcel N'Guessan	1	0	1	0	0	0	0	0	0	0
95	MF	(Malaysia) MAS	Rahim Razak	6	0	2+1	0	0	0	0+1	0	1+1	0
Forwards
7	FW	(Liberia) LBR	Abu Kamara	30	16	19+3	13	1	0	1+1	0	5	3
70	FW	(Burundi) BDI	Sudi Abdallah	8	1	4+3	1	0+1	0	0	0	0	0
90	FW	(Timor-Leste) TLS	Pedro Henrique	18	4	9+1	2	0	0	1+1	0	6	2
99	FW	(Malaysia) MAS	Nurshamil Abd Ghani	11	0	2+5	0	0	0	0+2	0	1+1	0
Left the Club during the Season
1	GK	(Philippines) PHI	Julian Schwarzer	5	0	5	0	0	0	0	0	0	0
6	MF	(Uzbekistan) UZB	Sirojiddin Kuziev	14	1	7+4	1	1	0	1+1	0	0	0
10	FW	(Nigeria) NGR	Michael Ijezie	3	0	0+1	0	0+1	0	1	0	0	0

Last updated: 17 December 2023
Source: Competitions, Soccerway.com
