= 2022 Kuching City F.C. season =

Kuching City
2022 season
- Chairman: Fazzrudin Abdul Rahman
- CEO: Iswandi Ali Hassan
- Head coach: Irfan Bakti Abu Salim
- Stadium: Sarawak Stadium
- Malaysia Premier League: 3rd (promoted)
- Malaysia FA Cup: Quarter-finals
- Malaysia Cup: Quarter-finals
- Top goalscorer: League: Abu Kamara (11); All: Abu Kamara (13)

The 2022 season was Kuching City's seventh year in existence and their third season in the Malaysia Premier League, second tier of Malaysian football. The club also participated in the Malaysia FA Cup and the Malaysia Cup.

== Events ==
Hidhir Idris joined the club on loan from Kedah Darul Aman. Shafizi Iqmal dan Wan Muhammad Faiz also joined the club with one-year contract.

The club signed three new foreign players Yuki Tanigawa, Abu Kamara and Keanu Marsh-Brown for the 2022 season.

== Players ==
=== First-team squad ===
As of 10 February 2022

Note: Flags indicate national team as defined under FIFA eligibility rules; some limited exceptions apply. Players may hold more than one non-FIFA nationality.

No.	Pos.	Nation	Player
1	GK	MAS	Andy Nicholas
2	DF	MAS	Jimmy Raymond
5	DF	BRA	Aylton Alemão
6	MF	MAS	Diego Baggio
7	FW	LBR	Abu Kamara
8	MF	MAS	Joseph Kalang Tie (captain)
9	DF	MAS	Adam Shreen (vice-captain)
11	MF	MAS	Hidhir Idris (on loan from Kedah Darul Aman)
12	DF	MAS	Rames Lai Ban Huat
13	DF	MAS	Dzulazlan Ibrahim
14	MF	MAS	Amir Amri Salleh
16	DF	MAS	Che Mohamad Arif
17	MF	MAS	Rafiezan Razali (third-captain)
18	FW	MAS	Rafiq Shah Zaim
20	GK	MAS	Shaiful Wazizi

No.	Pos.	Nation	Player
21	MF	MAS	Alauddin Farid
22	MF	MAS	Zainudin Bohri
24	DF	MAS	Badrul Hisham
27	GK	MAS	Wan Azraie
28	MF	MAS	Faiz Wan Sulaiman
29	FW	MAS	Amirrul Iqmal
31	MF	MAS	Raziman Razali
35	DF	MAS	Azuanie Jasman
37	MF	MAS	Hafiz Abu Bakar
44	MF	MAS	Alif Hassan
55	FW	MAS	Shafizi Iqmal
77	DF	JPN	Yuki Tanigawa
87	GK	MAS	Iqbal Suhimi
89	DF	MAS	Mazwandi Zekeria (fourth-captain)
99	MF	BRA	Gabryel

=== Transfers in ===
Note: Flags indicate national team as defined under FIFA eligibility rules; some limited exceptions apply. Players may hold more than one non-FIFA nationality.

No.	Pos.	Nation	Player
7	FW	LBR	Abu Kamara (from Makedonija G.P.)
11	MF	MAS	Hidhir Idris (on loan from Kedah Darul Aman)
16	DF	MAS	Che Mohamad Arif (from Kelantan)
20	GK	MAS	Shaiful Wazizi (from Sarawak United)
28	MF	MAS	Faiz Wan Sulaiman (from Penang)
77	DF	JPN	Yuki Tanigawa (from Kelantan United)
99	MF	BRA	Gabryel (from Al-Khaburah)

=== Transfers out ===
Note: Flags indicate national team as defined under FIFA eligibility rules; some limited exceptions apply. Players may hold more than one non-FIFA nationality.

No.	Pos.	Nation	Player
—	FW	MAS	Shafiq Shaharudin (to Kuala Lumpur Rovers)
—	DF	MAS	Hairol Mokhtar
—	MF	JPN	Yuta Suzuki (to Swadhinata KS)
—	FW	NGR	Michael Ijezie
—	DF	MAS	Izray Iffarul
—	MF	MAS	Hafis Saperi
—	FW	BRA	Bryan Jones
—	FW	BRA	Hudson Jesus
—	GK	MAS	Hafiezulhisyam Roslee
—	MF	MAS	Samsu Alam Samad
—	FW	MAS	Wan Badzreen
—	DF	MAS	Nazrul Abdul Samad

== Competitions ==
=== Malaysia Premier League ===
24 August 2022 1	Kuching City	1–0	Selangor 2

11 April 2022 2	Kuching City	2–1	Kelantan

17 April 2022 3	Johor Darul Ta'zim II	3–1	Kuching City

23 April 2022 4	Kuching City	4–0	FAM-MSN Project

28 April 2022 5	PDRM	2–2	Kuching City

7 May 2022 6	UiTM	0–2	Kuching City

20 May 2022 7	Kelantan United	0–0	Kuching City

24 May 2022 8	Kuching City	1–5	Terengganu II

27 May 2022 9	Kuching City	2–1	Perak

30 May 2022 10	Selangor 2	1–5	Kuching City

25 June 2022 11	Kuching City	2–1	PDRM

1 July 2022 12	Terengganu II	1–0	Kuching City

31 July 2022 13	Kelantan	2–0	Kuching City

9 August 2022 14	Kuching City	0–0	Johor Darul Ta'zim II

14 August 2022 15	FAM-MSN Project	0–3	Kuching City

20 August 2022 16	Kuching City	2–1	UiTM

4 September 2022 17	Kuching City	2–1	Kelantan United

17 September 2022 18	Perak	1–1	Kuching City

Pos	Team	Pld	W	D	L	GF	GA	GD	Pts	Qualification or relegation
1	Johor Darul Ta'zim II (Note: Johor Darul Ta'zim II, Selangor II, and Terengganu II aren't eligible to promote as their parent clubs (Johor Darul Ta'zim, Selangor, and Terengganu) play in the Super League. These feeder teams can only play in leagues below their parents'. They also can't play in the Malaysian Cup as they're only eligible to play in the Malaysian Cup if their parents fail to do so (which is not possible currently).) (C)	18	13	3	2	38	13	+25	42	Relocated to MFL Cup
2	Kelantan	18	11	4	3	27	14	+13	37	Promotion to Super League and Qualification to Malaysia Cup
3	Kuching City	18	10	4	4	30	20	+10	34	Promotion to Super League and Qualification to Malaysia Cup
4	Terengganu II	18	10	3	5	29	18	+11	33	Relocated to MFL Cup
5	Kelantan United	18	6	7	5	23	19	+4	25	Promotion to Super League and Qualification to Malaysia Cup

Updated to match(es) played on 4 September 2022. Source: MFL
Rules for classification: 1) Points; 2) Goal difference; 3) Number of goals scored.
(C) Champions

=== Malaysia FA Cup ===
31 March 2022 First round	Kuching City	2–0	UiTM

17 May 2022 Second round	Perlis United	0–3	Kuching City

23 July 2022 Quarter-final	Terengganu	4–1	Kuching City

=== Malaysia Cup ===
==== Knockout stage ====
26 October 2022 Round of 16 Leg 1	Penang	2–2	Kuching City

31 October 2022 Round of 16 Leg 2	Kuching City	2–1 (4–3 agg.)	Penang

5 November 2022 Quarter-finals Leg 1	Kuching City	0–1	Sabah

11 November 2022 Quarter-finals Leg 2	Sabah	1–1 (2–1 agg.)	Kuching City

== Squad statistics ==
=== Appearances and goals ===
- Players listed with no appearances have been in the matchday squad but only as unused substitutes.

No.	Pos	Nat	Player	Total		League		FA Cup		Malaysia Cup	
No.	Pos	Nat	Player	Apps	Goals	Apps	Goals	Apps	Goals	Apps	Goals
Goalkeepers
1	GK	(Malaysia) MAS	Andy Nicholas	1	0	1	0	0	0	0	0
20	GK	(Malaysia) MAS	Shaiful Wazizi	16	0	10+1	0	1	0	4	0
27	GK	(Malaysia) MAS	Wan Azraie	8	0	7	0	1	0	0	0
87	GK	(Malaysia) MAS	Iqbal Suhimi	1	0	0	0	1	0	0	0
Defenders
2	DF	(Malaysia) MAS	Jimmy Raymond	5	0	1+1	0	0	0	1+2	0
5	DF	(Brazil) BRA	Aylton Alemão	24	2	17	1	3	1	4	0
12	DF	(Malaysia) MAS	Rames Lai Ban Huat	25	1	18	1	3	0	4	0
13	DF	(Malaysia) MAS	Dzulazlan Ibrahim	15	0	7+4	0	0	0	2+2	0
16	DF	(Malaysia) MAS	Che Mohamad Arif	9	0	1+6	0	1	0	1	0
24	DF	(Malaysia) MAS	Badrul Hisham	4	0	0+3	0	0+1	0	0	0
77	DF	(Japan) JPN	Yuki Tanigawa	25	3	18	3	3	0	4	0
89	DF	(Malaysia) MAS	Mazwandi Zekeria	6	0	3+1	0	1	0	0+1	0
Midfielders
6	MF	(Malaysia) MAS	Dieogo Baggio	11	0	1+8	0	0+1	0	0+1	0
8	MF	(Malaysia) MAS	Joseph Kalang Tie	21	0	5+10	0	0+2	0	0+4	0
9	MF	(Malaysia) MAS	Adam Shreen	23	0	16	0	3	0	4	0
11	MF	(Malaysia) MAS	Hidhir Idris	20	0	12+1	0	2+1	0	1+3	0
14	MF	(Malaysia) MAS	Amir Amri	22	5	7+9	3	2+1	2	3	0
17	MF	(Malaysia) MAS	Rafiezan Razali	15	0	7+4	0	0+1	0	3	0
19	MF	(Malaysia) MAS	Irwan Syazmin	6	0	5	0	1	0	0	0
21	MF	(Malaysia) MAS	Alauddin Farid	5	0	1+4	0	0	0	0	0
22	MF	(Malaysia) MAS	Zainudin Bohri	2	0	0+1	0	0+1	0	0	0
28	MF	(Malaysia) MAS	Wan Mohammad Faiz	25	4	18	3	3	0	4	1
37	MF	(Malaysia) MAS	Hafiz Abu Bakar	2	0	0+1	0	0+1	0	0	0
44	MF	(Malaysia) MAS	Alif Hassan	20	6	14	3	2	1	4	2
Forwards
7	FW	(Liberia) LBR	Abu Kamara	24	13	16+1	11	3	1	4	1
18	FW	(Malaysia) MAS	Rafiq Shah Zaim	3	0	0+2	0	0	0	1	0
29	MF	(Malaysia) MAS	Amirrul Iqmal	3	0	0+2	0	0+1	0	0	0
55	FW	(Malaysia) MAS	Shafizi Iqmal	25	4	6+12	3	1+2	1	0+4	0
99	FW	(Brazil) BRA	Gabryel	8	1	6+1	1	1	0	0	0
Left the club during the Season
10	MF	(Guyana) GUY	Keanu Marsh-Brown	2	0	1	0	1	0	0	0

Last updated: 11 November 2022
Source: Competitions, Soccerway.com
