= 2021 Kelantan United F.C. season =

Kelantan United
2021 season
- President: Che Abdullah Mat Nawi
- Executive director: Anas Karimi
- Head coach: Nazrulerwan Makmor
- Stadium: Sultan Muhammad IV Stadium
- Malaysia Premier League: 7th
- Malaysia Cup: Group stage
- Top goalscorer: League: Alfusainey Gassama (11); All: Alfusainey Gassama (12)
Home colours	Away colours	Third colours

The 2021 season was Kelantan United's 6th year in their history and second season in the Malaysia Premier League since last year following promotion 2019 season. Along with the league, the club will also compete in the Malaysia Cup.

== Events ==
On 27 December 2020, the club has announced the line-up for the 2021 Malaysia Premier League.

On 7 February 2021, Shuhei Fukai joined the club. Earlier, the club already signed Masashi Motoyama and Yuki Tanigawa while Gassama Alfussainey retained from last year.

On 25 May 2021, Zafuan Azeman joined the club from Penang on loan deal.

On 28 May 2021, it was announced that Ariusdius Jais dan Evan Wensley from Sabah will join the club on 6-month loan deal.

On 19 July 2021, Nazrulerwan Makmor joined as club's new head coach. Akira Higashiyama has been appointed as club's technical director.

On 28 July 2021, Kelantan United won 4-0 over Perak II in a league match.

On 29 July 2021, Zafuan Azeman and Gassama Alfusainey sidelined from match against Johor Darul Ta'zim II after involved in fights after league match against Perak II.

== Players ==
=== First-team squad ===
As of 31 July 2021

Note: Flags indicate national team as defined under FIFA eligibility rules; some limited exceptions apply. Players may hold more than one non-FIFA nationality.

No.	Pos.	Nation	Player
1	GK	MAS	Nasharuden Hashim
3	DF	MAS	Fitri Omar (vice-captain)
4	DF	JPN	Shuhei Fukai
5	DF	MAS	Syahmi Shukri
6	MF	MAS	Hakim Ismail
7	FW	MAS	Fakhrul Zaman
8	MF	MAS	Shahrul Hakim
9	FW	MAS	Asraff Aliffuddin
10	MF	JPN	Masashi Motoyama (3rd-captain)
11	MF	MAS	Qayyum Marjoni
15	DF	MAS	Hariz Kamarudin
16	MF	MAS	Badhri Radzi (captain)
17	MF	MAS	Fazrul Amir
18	MF	MAS	Syahrul Azwari
19	MF	MAS	Imran Samso
20	MF	MAS	Ariusdius Jais (on loan from Sabah)

No.	Pos.	Nation	Player
21	DF	MAS	Umeir Aznan
22	GK	MAS	Ramadhan Hamid
25	MF	MAS	Azriddin Rosli
27	MF	MAS	Juzaerul Jasmi
28	MF	MAS	Amirul Syafik
29	FW	GAM	Alfusainey Gassama (4th-captain)
30	GK	MAS	Muhamad Nor Amin
33	GK	MAS	Fikri Che Soh
44	MF	MAS	Zufar Akmal
48	MF	MAS	Adam Malique
55	MF	MAS	Shafizi Iqmal (on loan from Selangor II)
69	GK	MAS	Alif Hanbali
77	MF	JPN	Yuki Tanigawa
80	DF	MAS	Danish Danial
88	DF	MAS	Evan Wensley (on loan from Sabah)
99	FW	MAS	Zafuan Azeman (on loan from Penang)

== Competitions ==
=== Malaysia Premier League ===
==== League table ====
Pos	Team	Pld	W	D	L	GF	GA	GD	Pts	Qualification or relegation
5	Kuching City	20	7	6	7	22	22	0	27	Qualification for the Malaysia Cup group stage
6	Kelantan	20	8	3	9	23	28	−5	27	Qualification for the Malaysia Cup group stage
7	Kelantan United	20	8	2	10	25	28	−3	26	Qualification for the Malaysia Cup group stage
8	PDRM	20	7	5	8	22	25	−3	26	
9	Selangor II (Note: Johor Darul Ta'zim II, Perak II, Selangor II and Terengganu II cannot be promoted from Malaysia Premier League and play in Malaysia Cup as Johor Darul Ta'zim F.C., Perak FA, Selangor F.C. and Terengganu FC (their parent clubs) remain in Malaysia Super League and play in Malaysia Cup. Should the team be relegated to Malaysia Premier League or will not play in Malaysia Cup, Johor Darul Ta'zim II, Perak II, Selangor II and Terengganu II will have to drop to Malaysia M3 League or will play in Malaysia Cup.)	20	5	9	6	27	26	+1	24	

Source: MFL
Rules for classification: 1) Points; 2) Goal difference; 3) Number of goals scored.

==== Matches ====
Win Draw Loss

7 March 2021 1	Sarawak United	2–0	Kelantan United
MYT (UTC+8)

10 March 2021 2	Kelantan United	2–0	PDRM
MYT (UTC+8)

13 March 2021 3	Kelantan United	2–1	Perak II
MYT (UTC+8)

16 March 2021 4	Kelantan United	0–0	Johor Darul Ta'zim II
MYT (UTC+8)

19 March 2021 5	Selangor 2	1–0	Kelantan United
MYT (UTC+8)

6 April 2021 6	Kelantan United	0–2	Kelantan
MYT (UTC+8)

9 April 2021 7	Negeri Sembilan	2–3	Kelantan United
MYT (UTC+8)

17 April 2021 8	FAM-MSN Project	0–3	Kelantan United
MYT (UTC+8)

24 April 2021 9	Kelantan United	1–0	Kuching City
MYT (UTC+8)

2 May 2021 10	Terengganu II	4–1	Kelantan United
MYT (UTC+8)

7 May 2021 11	Kelantan United	2–3	Sarawak United
MYT (UTC+8)

25 July 2021 12	PDRM	1–0	Kelantan United
MYT (UTC+8)

28 July 2021 13	Perak II	0–4	Kelantan United
MYT (UTC+8)

1 August 2021 14	Johor Darul Ta'zim II	3–0	Kelantan United
MYT (UTC+8)

4 August 2021 15	Kelantan United	2–2	Selangor 2
MYT (UTC+8)

11 August 2021 16	Kelantan	3–1	Kelantan United
MYT (UTC+8)

21 August 2021 17	Kelantan United	0–2	Negeri Sembilan
MYT (UTC+8)

29 August 2021 18	Kelantan United	0–1	FAM-MSN Project
MYT (UTC+8)

21 September 2021 19	Kelantan United	1–0	Terengganu II
MYT (UTC+8)

24 September 2021 20	Kuching City	1–3	Kelantan United
MYT (UTC+8)

=== Malaysia Cup ===
==== Group stage ====
Pos	Team	Pld	W	D	L	GF	GA	GD	Pts	Qualification	MEL	KED	KLU	NSE
1	Melaka United	6	5	1	0	15	5	+10	16	Quarter-finals	—	2–0	2–1	2–0
2	Kedah Darul Aman	6	4	0	2	13	6	+7	12	Quarter-finals	1–3	—	3–0	3–0 (Note: Negeri Sembilan withdrew from the tournament on 22 October 2021, after 20 players and 4 staff members tested positive for COVID-19; this prompted them to withdraw for the safety of all parties and were advised by the team's medical doctor. As according to MFL's rule book, all of Negeri Sembilan's remaining matches were awarded a 3–0 win to the opposing team.)
3	Kelantan United	6	1	1	4	8	12	−4	4		3–3	1–3	—	0–1
4	Negeri Sembilan	6	1	0	5	1	14	−13	3	Withdrew	0–3	0–3	0–3	—

Source: MFL, FAM
Notes:

27 September 2021 1	Kedah Darul Aman	3–0	Kelantan United
MYT (UTC+8)

1 October 2021 2	Kelantan United	0–1	Negeri Sembilan
MYT (UTC+8)

29 October 2021 3	Melaka United	2–1	Kelantan United
MYT (UTC+8)

1 November 2021 4	Kelantan United	3–3	Melaka United
MYT (UTC+8)

6 November 2021 5	Kelantan United	1–3	Kedah Darul Aman
MYT (UTC+8)

9 November 2021 6	Negeri Sembilan	0–3	Kelantan United
MYT (UTC+8)

== Statistics ==
=== Appearances and goals ===
No.	Pos	Nat	Player	Total		League		Malaysia Cup	
No.	Pos	Nat	Player	Apps	Goals	Apps	Goals	Apps	Goals
Goalkeepers
1	GK	(Malaysia) MAS	Nasharuden Hashim	0	0	0	0	0	0
22	GK	(Malaysia) MAS	Ramadhan Hamid	6	0	5	0	1	0
30	GK	(Malaysia) MAS	Nor Amin Mat Gani	0	0	0	0	0	0
33	GK	(Malaysia) MAS	Fikri Che Soh	20	0	15+1	0	4	0
69	GK	(Malaysia) MAS	Alif Hanbali	0	0	0	0	0	0
Defenders
3	DF	(Malaysia) MAS	Fitri Omar	11	0	6+2	0	2+1	0
4	DF	(Japan) JPN	Shuhei Fukai	25	2	18+2	1	5	1
6	DF	(Malaysia) MAS	Hakim Ismail	14	1	6+4	1	1+3	0
11	DF	(Malaysia) MAS	Qayyum Marjoni	15	1	11+3	1	0+1	0
15	DF	(Malaysia) MAS	Hariz Kamarudin	22	2	15+3	2	3+1	0
21	DF	(Malaysia) MAS	Umeir Aznan	5	0	2+1	0	2	0
80	DF	(Malaysia) MAS	Danish Danial	0	0	0	0	0	0
88	DF	(Malaysia) MAS	Evan Wensley	11	0	8	0	3	0
Midfielders
8	MF	(Malaysia) MAS	Shahrul Hakim	14	0	7+2	0	3+2	0
10	MF	(Japan) JPN	Masashi Motoyama	16	0	4+11	0	1	0
16	MF	(Malaysia) MAS	Badhri Radzi	11	0	8+1	0	2	0
17	MF	(Malaysia) MAS	Fazrul Amir	13	0	6+5	0	0+2	0
18	MF	(Malaysia) MAS	Syahrul Azwari	14	1	5+5	1	4	0
19	MF	(Malaysia) MAS	Imran Samso	12	0	4+5	0	3	0
20	MF	(Malaysia) MAS	Ariusdius Jais	10	0	7+2	0	1	0
25	MF	(Malaysia) MAS	Azriddin Rosli	11	0	4+5	0	1+1	0
27	MF	(Malaysia) MAS	Juzaerul Jasmi	14	0	7+5	0	1+1	0
28	MF	(Malaysia) MAS	Amirul Shafik	22	2	10+7	2	3+2	0
44	MF	(Malaysia) MAS	Zufar Akmal	3	0	2+1	0	0	0
48	MF	(Malaysia) MAS	Adam Malique	1	0	0+1	0	0	0
55	MF	(Malaysia) MAS	Shafizi Iqmal	10	2	2+3	1	3+2	1
77	MF	(Japan) JPN	Yuki Tanigawa	24	1	19	0	5	1
Forwards
7	FW	(Malaysia) MAS	Fakhrul Zaman	16	3	5+7	2	1+3	1
9	FW	(Malaysia) MAS	Asraff Aliffuddin	20	1	12+4	1	1+3	0
29	FW	(The Gambia) GAM	Alfusainey Gassama	23	12	18	11	5	1
99	FW	(Malaysia) MAS	Zafuan Azeman	7	1	3+3	1	0+1	0
Players transferred out during the season
5	DF	(Malaysia) MAS	Syahmi Shukri	10	0	9+1	0	0	0
14	DF	(Malaysia) MAS	Wan Afiq Kasbi	0	0	0	0	0	0
99	FW	(Malaysia) MAS	Suhaimi Abu	6	0	1+5	0	0	0

Last updated: 6 November 2021
Source: Competitions
