= 2022 Malaysia Premier League =

Malaysia Premier League
- Season: 2022
- Dates: 5 March – 30 September 2022
- Champions: Johor Darul Ta'zim II; 2nd Second Division title
- Promoted: Kelantan; Kuching City; Kelantan United; PDRM; Perak
- Matches: 87
- Top goalscorer: Abu Kamara (11 goals)
- Biggest home win: 6 goals Johor Darul Ta'zim II 5–1 PDRM (7 May 2022)
- Biggest away win: 6 goals Kuching City 1–5 Terengganu II (24 May 2022)
- Highest scoring: 4 goals Kelantan United 4–0 Selangor II (19 August 2022)
- Total attendance: 89,630
- Average attendance: 84,500

The 2022 Malaysia Premier League was the 19th season of the Malaysia Premier League, the second-tier professional football league in Malaysia since its establishment in 2004. This was the last season of Malaysia Premier League as the league discontinued from the following year.

A possible 6 non-feeder teams from this league were planned to be promoted to the upcoming 18-team expansion Malaysia Super League next season. The top 4 non-feeder teams were planned to be promoted automatically to the 2023 Malaysia Super League. The bottom two non-feeder teams will need a play-off against 2022 Malaysia M3 League champions and runners-up to decide the last two spots for promotion to the Super League. However, on 27 September 2022, it was announced by Malaysia Football League that the bottom two non-feeder teams, Perak and UiTM has been promoted automatically to 2023 Super League because the M3 teams that applied for licensing to play in Super League, including champions PIB FC, have failed in their application.

The top 5 non-feeder teams will qualify for the 2022 Malaysia Cup.

== Team changes ==
A total of 10 teams contested the league, including 8 sides from the 2021 season and 2 relegated from the 2021 Malaysia Super League.

=== To Premier League ===
Relegated from Super League

- Perak
- UiTM

Promoted from M3 League

- No teams.^{1}

=== From Premier League ===
Promoted to Super League

- Negeri Sembilan
- Sarawak United

Relegated to Liga M3

- No teams.^{2}

Expulsion

- Perak II^{3}

Notes:

^1No teams from Malaysia M3 League were promoted due to the 2021 Malaysia M3 League season cancellation.
^2No teams were relegated to Malaysia M3 League as it was decided to keep all the teams from the previous season that were not promoted or expelled.
^3Parent Team and Feeder Team cannot play in the same league, therefore after the relegation of Perak FC from Malaysia Super League last year, Perak II must now play in Malaysia M3 League or dissolve. The team later elected to dissolve itself.

== Stadium and locations ==
Locations of teams in the 2022 Malaysia Premier League teams

Note: Table lists in alphabetical order.

Team	Location	Stadium	Capacity
FAM-MSN Project	Shah Alam	UiTM Stadium	10,000
Johor Darul Ta'zim II	Larkin	Tan Sri Dato Haji Hassan Yunos Stadium	30,000
Kelantan	Kota Bharu	Sultan Muhammad IV Stadium	22,000
Kelantan United	Kota Bharu	Sultan Muhammad IV Stadium	22,000
Kuching City	Kuching	Sarawak State Stadium	20,000
PDRM	Kuala Lumpur	Kuala Lumpur Stadium	18,000
Perak	Ipoh	Perak Stadium	27,036
Selangor II	Selayang	Selayang Stadium	16,000
Terengganu II	Kuala Terengganu	Sultan Ismail Nasiruddin Shah Stadium	15,000
UiTM	Shah Alam	UiTM Stadium	10,000

== Personnel and sponsoring ==
Note: Flags indicate national team as has been defined under FIFA eligibility rules. Players may hold more than one non-FIFA nationality.

Team	Head coach	Captain	Kit manufacturer	Shirt sponsor(s)
FAM-MSN Project	(Malaysia) Hassan Sazali Waras	(Malaysia) Amirul Akmal Safarinizam	Kelme	
Johor Darul Ta'zim II	(Argentina) Mariano Echeverría	(Spain) Fernando Rodríguez	Nike	UNICEF
Kelantan	(Malaysia) Rezal Zambery Yahya	(Malaysia) Che Safwan Hazman	93 Sports	Zamburger
Kelantan United	(Malaysia) Sazami Shafii (interim)	(Malaysia) Faisal Rosli	Gatti	Kelantan Melangkah Ke Hadapan, Yakult
Kuching City	(Malaysia) Irfan Bakti	(Malaysia) Joseph Kalang Tie	StarSports	City of Unity
PDRM	(Malaysia) Razak Jaamadi (interim)	(Ghana) Alexander Amponsah	Oren Sport	Top Glove, redONE
Perak	(Malaysia) Yusri Che Lah	(Malaysia) Indra Putra Mahayuddin	Cheetah	XOX
Selangor II	(Malaysia) Rusdi Suparman	(Ghana) George Attram	Joma	PKNS, MBI (home), Lithera (away)
Terengganu II	(Malaysia) Badrul Afzan	(Montenegro) Argzim Redžović	Umbro	Colever
UiTM	(Malaysia) Ismail Ibrahim	(Malaysia) Ramadhan Hamid	Let's Play Performance	

=== Coaching changes ===
Note: Flags indicate national team as has been defined under FIFA eligibility rules. Players may hold more than one non-FIFA nationality.

Team	Outgoing coach	Manner of departure	Date of vacancy	Position in table	Incoming coach	Date of appointment
Kelantan	(Italy) Marco Ragini	Resigned	19 November 2021	Pre-season	(Malaysia) Rezal Zambery Yahya	19 November 2021
Selangor II	(Germany) Michael Feichtenbeiner	Promoted to 1st team	21 November 2021	Pre-season	(Malaysia) Rusdi Suparman	10 December 2021
Kelantan United	(Japan) Akira Higashiyama	Promoted to Technical Director	30 November 2021	Pre-season	(Malaysia) Syamsul Saad	10 January 2022
Perak	(Malaysia) Shahril Nizam Khalil	End of caretaker	30 November 2021	Pre-season	(Malaysia) Yusri Che Lah	26 January 2022
Johor Darul Ta'zim II	(Spain) Rafa Gil	End of contract	30 November 2021	Pre-season	(Argentina) Mariano Echeverría	4 February 2022
UiTM	(Germany) Frank Bernhardt	End of contract	30 November 2021	Pre-season	(Malaysia) Ismail Ibrahim	3 March 2022
FAM-MSN Project	(Malaysia) Yusri Che Lah	Resigned	10 December 2021	Pre-season	(Malaysia) Hassan Sazali Waras	3 March 2021
Kelantan United	(Malaysia) Syamsul Saad	Rested	8 August 2022	Mid-Season	(Malaysia) Sazami Shafii (interim)	8 August 2022
PDRM	(Malaysia) Wan Rohaimi Wan Ismail	Rested	29 August 2022	Mid-Season	(Malaysia) Razak Jaamadi (interim)	29 August 2022

== Foreign players ==
Players name in bold indicates the player was registered after the start of the season.

The number of foreign players is restricted to four each team including at least one player from the AFC country.

Note: Flags indicate national team as has been defined under FIFA eligibility rules. Players may hold more than one non-FIFA nationality.

Club	Player 1	Player 2	Player 3	AFC Player	Former Player
Johor Darul Ta'zim II	(Spain) Moussa Sidibé	(Gabon) **Lévy Madinda**		(Philippines) Carli De Murga	(Brazil) Maurício (Philippines) Bienvenido Maranon (Spain) Fernando Rodríguez
Kelantan	(Brazil) Nixon Guylherme	(Brazil) **Felipe Hereda**	(Haiti) Kervens Belfort	(Japan) **Kenta Hara**	(Lebanon) Fadel Antar (Indonesia) Natanael Siringoringo
Kelantan United	(Japan) Shuhei Fukai	(Nigeria) Jacob Njoku	(Ghana) **Julius Ofori**	(Japan) Masashi Motoyama	(Ghana) Amidu Salifu
Kuching City	(Brazil) Aylton Alemão	(Brazil) **Gabryel**	(Liberia) Abu Kamara	(Japan) Yuki Tanigawa	(Guyana) Keanu Marsh-Brown
PDRM	(Slovakia) Martin Adamec	(Ghana) Alex Amponsah	(Slovakia) Miloš Lačný	(Jordan) Fadi Awad	
Perak	(Nigeria) **Sunday Afolabi**	(Argentina) **Luciano Guaycochea**	(Croatia) **Stipe Plazibat**		
Selangor II	(Ghana) Alex Agyarkwa	(Ghana) Richmond Ankrah	(Ghana) **Kelvin Kyei**	(Myanmar) Hein Htet Aung	(Ghana) Jordan Ayimbila (Ghana) George Attram
Terengganu II	(Montenegro) Argzim Redžović	(Namibia) Petrus Shitembi		(Philippines) (Germany) Manny Ott	(Ghana) Jordan Mintah
UiTM	(Ghana) **George Attram**				
FAM-MSN Project					

== League table ==
Pos	Team	Pld	W	D	L	GF	GA	GD	Pts	Qualification or relegation
1	Johor Darul Ta'zim II (Note: Johor Darul Ta'zim II, Selangor II, and Terengganu II aren't eligible to promote as their parent clubs (Johor Darul Ta'zim, Selangor, and Terengganu) play in the Super League. These feeder teams can only play in leagues below their parents'. They also can't play in the Malaysian Cup as they're only eligible to play in the Malaysian Cup if their parents fail to do so (which is not possible currently).) (C)	18	13	3	2	38	13	+25	42	Relocated to MFL Cup
2	Kelantan	18	11	4	3	27	14	+13	37	Promotion to Super League and Qualification to Malaysia Cup
3	Kuching City	18	10	4	4	30	20	+10	34	Promotion to Super League and Qualification to Malaysia Cup
4	Terengganu II	18	10	3	5	29	18	+11	33	Relocated to MFL Cup
5	Kelantan United	18	6	7	5	23	19	+4	25	Promotion to Super League and Qualification to Malaysia Cup
6	PDRM	18	6	3	9	20	28	−8	21	Promotion to Super League and Qualification to Malaysia Cup
7	UiTM (D)	18	6	2	10	18	25	−7	20	Withdrawn from Liga Super and relegated to Al-ikhsan Cup (Note: UiTM FC withdrew from Liga Super before the start of 2023 season.)
8	Selangor II	18	4	4	10	14	25	−11	16	Relocated to MFL Cup
9	Perak	18	5	2	11	16	30	−14	8 (Note: Perak have been deducted three points on 1st April for breaching the finances regulation. Later, six points more were deducted on 15th April following the failure to pay the players and officials salary one day before.)	Promotion to Super League
10	FAM-MSN Project (Note: FAM-MSN Project is only as a backup squad and will not promote to Super League.)	18	2	2	14	10	33	−23	8	Relocated to MFL Cup

Updated to match(es) played on 4 September 2022. Source: MFL
Rules for classification: 1) Points; 2) Goal difference; 3) Number of goals scored.
(C) Champions; (D) Disqualified
Notes:

|status_UITM=D

== Result table ==
Home \ Away	FMP	JDT	KEL	KLU	KUC	PRK	PDRM	SEL	TFCII	UITM
FAM-MSN Project		0–2	0–1	1–2	0–3	0–1	1–0	1–2	1–5	0–1
Johor Darul Ta'zim II	2–1		1–2	2–0	3–1	1–0	5–1	3–2	3–0	4–0
Kelantan	1–0	1–1		0–0	2–0	1–2	2–1	1–2	2–2	1–0
Kelantan United	1–1	1–1	1–1		0–0	0–1	1–1	4–0	2–3	3–1
Kuching City	4–0	0–0	2–1	2–1		2–1	2–1	1–0	1–5	2–1
Perak	1–3	1–3	1–3	2–3	1–1		1–3	2–1	0–0	0–2
PDRM	1–0	0–3	1–3	0–1	2–2	2–0		1–0	2–1	0–1
Selangor II	0–0	0–1	0–1	1–1	1–5	0–1	4–1		0–2	0–0
Terengganu II	2–0	2–1	0–1	1–0	1–0	3–0	0–2	0–0		2–0
UiTM	4–1	1–2	0–3	1–2	0–2	2–1	1–1	0–1	3–0	

Updated to match(es) played on 4 September 2022. Source: MFL
Legend: Blue = home team win; Yellow = draw; Red = away team win.
For upcoming matches, an "a" indicates there is an article about the rivalry between the two participants.

== Season statistics ==
=== Top goalscorers ===
As of matches played 17 September 2022

Rank	Player	Club	Goals
1	(Liberia) Abu Kamara	Kuching City	11
2	(Malaysia) Daryl Sham	Johor Darul Ta'zim II	8
2	(Spain) Fernando Rodriguez	Johor Darul Ta'zim II	8
2	(Malaysia) Nurshamil Abd Ghani	Kelantan	8
2	(Nigeria) Jacob Njoku	Kelantan United	8
2	(Slovakia) Martin Adamec	PDRM	8
2	(Malaysia) Wan Mohd Fazli	Terengganu II	8
8	(Ghana) Jordan Mintah	Terengganu II	7
9	(Mali) Moussa Sidibé	Johor Darul Ta'zim II	5
10	(Brazil) Nixon Guylherme	Kelantan	4
10	(Malaysia) Asraff Aliffuddin	Kelantan United	4
10	(Malaysia) Amirul Shafik Che Soh	Kelantan United	4
10	(Malaysia) Nik Sharif Haseefy	Selangor II	4

=== Top assists ===
As of matches played 17 September 2022

Rank	Player	Club	Assists
1	(Mali) Moussa Sidibé	Johor Darul Ta'zim II	9
2	(Malaysia) Engku Nur Shakir	Terengganu II	6
3	(Philippines) Bienvenido Marañón	Johor Darul Ta'zim II	5
3	(Malaysia) Daryl Sham	Johor Darul Ta'zim II	5
3	(Liberia) Abu Kamara	Kuching City	5
3	(Malaysia) Alif Hassan	Kuching City	5
7	(Malaysia) Adam Farhan	Johor Darul Ta'zim II	4
7	(Malaysia) Nik Akif	Kelantan United	4
7	(Malaysia) Amirul Syazwan	Terengganu II	4
10	(Haiti) Kervens Belfort	Kelantan	3
10	(Malaysia) Shahrul Igwan	Kelantan	3
10	(Malaysia) Syed Sobri	Kelantan	3
10	(Malaysia) Amirul Shafik Che Soh	Kelantan United	3
10	(Brazil) Gabryel	Kuching City	3

=== Hat-trick ===
As of matches played 15 August 2022

Player	For	Against	Result	Date
(Nigeria) Jacob Njoku	Kelantan United	Perak	2–3 (A)	27 April 2022
(Liberia) Abu Kamara	Kuching City	Selangor II	1–5 (A)	30 May 2022
(Malaysia) Zafri Zakaria	UiTM	Terengganu II	3-0 (H)	25 June 2022
(Malaysia) Alif Safwan	UiTM	FAM-MSN Project	4-1 (H)	10 August 2022

Notes (H) – Home team (A) – Away team

=== Clean Sheets ===
As of matches played 17 September 2022

Rank	Player	Club	Clean sheets
1	(Malaysia) Nik Amin	Kelantan	7
2	(Malaysia) Izham Tarmizi	Johor Darul Ta'zim II	6
3	(Malaysia) Syed Nasrulhaq	Terengganu II	5
4	(Malaysia) Fikri Che Soh	Kelantan United	3
4	(Malaysia) Wan Azraie	Kuching City	3
4	(Malaysia) Shaiful Wazizi	Kuching City	3
4	(Malaysia) Firdaus Irman	PDRM	3
4	(Malaysia) Zamir Selamat	Perak	3
4	(Malaysia) Sikh Izhan	Selangor II	3
4	(Malaysia) Ramdhan Hamid	UiTM	3

== See also ==
- 2022 Malaysia Super League
- 2022 Malaysia M3 League
- 2022 Malaysia M5 League
- 2022 Malaysia FA Cup
