= Hafiy Haikal =

Malaysian footballer

Personal information
- Full name: Muhamad Hafiy Haikal bin Ismail
- Date of birth: 24 April 1998 (age 28)
- Place of birth: Kuala Lumpur, Malaysia
- Height: 1.77 m (5 ft 9 1/2 in)
- Position: Defender

Team information
- Current team: Kelantan United
- Number: 14

Youth career
- 2014: Frenz United
- 2015: Harimau Muda C

Senior career*
Years	Team	Apps	(Gls)
2016–2022	Johor Darul Ta'zim II	14	(0)
2023–	Kelantan United	10	(0)

International career^{‡}
2013–2015	Malaysia U17	0	(0)
2015	Malaysia U19	4	(0)
2015–2019	Malaysia U20	0	(0)
- * Club domestic league appearances and goals as of 4 August 2022 ‡ National team caps and goals as of 15 April 2016

Muhamad Hafiy Haikal bin Ismail (born 24 April 1998) is a Malaysian professional footballer who plays as a defender for Malaysia Super League club Kelantan United.

== Club career ==
=== Kelantan United ===
On 4 January 2023, Hafiy joined Malaysia Super League club Kelantan United. He made his Malaysia Super League debut for the club in a 0–1 loss against Selangor on 26 February 2023.

== International career ==
On 15 August 2015, Hafiy received call up to the Malaysia U19s for a training camp for the 2015 AFF U-19 Youth Championship. He made 4 appearances during that tournament.

On 14 March 2018, Hafiy received call up to the Malaysia U21s for a training camp in Kelana Jaya.

== Career statistics ==
=== Club ===
As of 29 August 2021

Appearances and goals by club, season and competition
Club	Season	League			Cup		League Cup		Continental		Total	
Club	Season	Division	Apps	Goals	Apps	Goals	Apps	Goals	Apps	Goals	Apps	Goals
Johor Darul Ta'zim II	2016	Malaysia Premier League	0	0	–		–		–		0	0
Johor Darul Ta'zim II	2017	Malaysia Premier League	0	0	–		–		–		0	0
Johor Darul Ta'zim II	2018	Malaysia Premier League	0	0	–		–		–		0	0
Johor Darul Ta'zim II	2019	Malaysia Premier League	0	0	–		–		–		0	0
Johor Darul Ta'zim II	2020	Malaysia Premier League	0	0	–		–		–		0	0
Johor Darul Ta'zim II	2021	Malaysia Premier League	7	0	–		–		–		7	0
Johor Darul Ta'zim II	2022	Malaysia Super League	6	0	–		–		–		6	0
Johor Darul Ta'zim II	Total		0	0	0	0	0	0	–		0	0
Kelantan United	2023	Malaysia Super League	1	0	0	0	0	0	–		1	0
Kelantan United	Total		0	0	0	0	0	0	–		0	0
Career Total			0	0	0	0	0	0	–	–	0	0

== Honours ==
Johor Darul Ta'zim II

- Malaysia Premier League: 2022
- Malaysia Challenge Cup: 2019
