= Yuki Tanigawa =

Japanese footballer (born 1997)

Yuki Tanigawa 谷川 由来
Personal information
- Date of birth: 21 April 1997 (age 29)
- Place of birth: Shiga, Japan
- Height: 1.81 m (5 ft 11 in)
- Positions: Centre-back; defensive midfielder

Team information
- Current team: Kuching City
- Number: 77

Youth career
- 2013–2015: Moriyama Kita High School
- 2016–2019: Kyoto Sangyo University

Senior career*
Years	Team	Apps	(Gls)
2020	Kuching City	11	(1)
2021	Kelantan United	24	(1)
2022–	Kuching City	121	(8)
- * Club domestic league appearances and goals as of 15:34, 25 July 2025 (UTC)

Yuki Tanigawa (谷川 由来, Tanigawa Yuki; born 21 April 1997) is a Japanese professional footballer who plays as a centre-back for Malaysia Super League club Kuching City.

== Early life ==
Tanigawa was born in Shiga. He played for Moriyama Kita High School and Kyoto Sangyo University during his youth.

== Club career ==
=== Kuching City ===
On 7 January 2020, Tanigawa signed his first professional contract with Malaysia Premier League club Kuching City.

=== Kelantan United ===
On 6 December 2020, Tanigawa signed a one-year contract with Malaysia Premier League club Kelantan United ahead of the 2021 season.

=== Return to Kuching City ===
On 21 December 2021, Tanigawa joined Kuching City for a second stint ahead of the 2022 season. He was part of the squad that helped the club to promote to the top flight division.

On 26 December 2023, Kuching City announced an extended contract Tanigawa with 2 years period.

== Personal life ==
On 21 December 2023, Tanigawa married Nisha Ibrahim.

== Career statistics ==
=== Club ===
As of 8 August 2026.

Club	Season	League			National Cup		League Cup		Other		Total	
Club	Season	Division	Apps	Goals	Apps	Goals	Apps	Goals	Apps	Goals	Apps	Goals
Kuching City	2020	Malaysia Premier League	10	1	0	0	1 (Note: Appearances in the Malaysia Cup)	0	0	0	11	0
Kuching City	Total		10	1	0	0	1	0	0	0	11	0
Kelantan United	2021	Malaysia Premier League	19	0	0	0	5	1	0	0	24	1
Kelantan United	Total		19	0	0	0	5	1	0	0	24	1
Kuching City	2022	Malaysia Premier League	18	3	3 (Note: Appearances in the Malaysia FA Cup)	0	4	0	0	0	25	3
Kuching City	2023	Malaysia Super League	24	2	1	0	2	0	6 (Note: Appearances in the Malaysia Challenge Cup)	0	33	2
Kuching City	2024–25	Malaysia Super League	23	2	3	0	4	0	0	0	30	2
Kuching City	2025–26	Malaysia Super League	21	1	5	0	7	0	0	0	33	1
Kuching City	Total		65	8	12	0	17	0	6	0	121	8
Career total			0	0	0	0	0	0	0	0	0	0
