= 2020 PDRM FA season =

PDRM
2020 season
- Head coach: Ishak Kunju
- Stadium: KLFA Stadium
- Malaysia Super League: 12th (relegated)
- Malaysia FA Cup: Cancelled
- Malaysia Cup: Cancelled
- Top goalscorer: League: Eskandar Ismail (2); All: Eskandar Ismail (2)

The 2020 season was PDRM's 30th season in existence. Along with the league, the club also participated in the Malaysia Cup.

== Overview ==
On 24 January 2020, club announced 15 Malay Royal policemen registered as new players.

== Competitions ==
=== Malaysia Super League ===
Pos	Team	Pld	W	D	L	GF	GA	GD	Pts	Qualification or relegation
8	Pahang	11	4	2	5	18	18	0	14	
9	Melaka United	11	4	2	5	13	16	−3	11 (Note: Melaka have been docked three points following the decision from FAM.)	
10	Sabah	11	2	3	6	12	24	−12	9	
11	Felda United (R)	11	1	4	6	12	27	−15	7	Relegation to Malaysia Premier League
12	PDRM (R)	11	0	2	9	5	29	−24	−1 (Note: PDRM have been docked three points following the decision from FAM.)	Relegation to Malaysia Premier League

Source: Malaysian Football League
Rules for classification: 1) Points; 2) Goal difference; 3) Number of goals scored.
(R) Relegated

== Statistics ==
As of match played 10 October 2020

=== Appearances and goals ===
No.	Pos	Nat	Player	Total		League	
No.	Pos	Nat	Player	Apps	Goals	Apps	Goals
1	GK	(Malaysia) MAS	Bryan See	6	0	6	0
3	DF	(Malaysia) MAS	Farid Nezal	6	0	6	0
4	MF	(Malaysia) MAS	Nizam Rodzi	11	0	8+3	0
5	DF	(Malaysia) MAS	Syahmi Shukri	9	0	8+1	0
6	FW	(Malaysia) MAS	Izzad Muhamad	0	0	0	0
7	MF	(Malaysia) MAS	Surendran Ravindran	5	0	4+1	0
8	MF	(Malaysia) MAS	Hariz Irffan	3	0	2+1	0
9	FW	(Malaysia) MAS	Khairul Izuan	7	0	4+3	0
11	FW	(Malaysia) MAS	Christopher Keli	6	0	2+4	0
14	DF	(Malaysia) MAS	Raja Shahrulnizam	0	0	0	0
16	DF	(Malaysia) MAS	Alif Naquiddin	5	0	3+2	0
17	MF	(Malaysia) MAS	Dirga Surdi	9	0	4+5	0
18	GK	(Malaysia) MAS	Willfred Jabun	3	0	3	0
19	DF	(Malaysia) MAS	Amir Saiful	10	1	9+1	1
20	MF	(Malaysia) MAS	Satish Krishnan	4	0	2+2	0
21	FW	(Malaysia) MAS	Khaizuran Putera	3	0	1+2	0
22	GK	(Malaysia) MAS	Farzly Muhammad	2	0	2	0
24	DF	(Malaysia) MAS	Asri Mardzuki	6	0	4+2	0
26	MF	(Malaysia) MAS	Dick Cheny Waili	6	0	2+4	0
27	MF	(Malaysia) MAS	Eskandar Ismail	11	2	10+1	2
28	MF	(Malaysia) MAS	Erwan Ismail	4	0	1+3	0
29	MF	(Turkmenistan) TKM	Serdar Geldiýew	11	1	11	1
30	DF	(Malaysia) MAS	Hazwan Rahman	4	0	4	0
32	MF	(Malaysia) MAS	Safiee Ahmad	10	0	8+2	0
33	DF	(Turkmenistan) TKM	Şöhrat Söýünow	11	0	10+1	0
77	MF	(Malaysia) MAS	Hidhir Idris	3	0	3	0
Players away from the club on loan:
Players who left PDRM during the season:
10	FW	(Grenada) GRN	Antonio German	4	1	4	1
