= Zafuan Azeman =

Malaysian footballer

Personal information
- Full name: Muhammad Zafuan bin Azeman
- Date of birth: 10 June 1999 (age 27)
- Place of birth: Kangar, Perlis, Malaysia
- Position: Forward

Youth career
- Bukit Jalil Sports School

Senior career*
Years	Team	Apps	(Gls)
2018	Kedah Darul Aman	2	(0)
2019	Perlis	20	(4)
2019–2020	Angthong	12	(1)
2021–2022	Penang	3	(0)
2021	→ Kelantan United (loan)	6	(1)
2023	Uthai Thani	4	(0)
2023	Perlis United	4	(1)
2024	Uthai Thani	0	(0)
2024	Pattani	3	(0)

International career
2017	Malaysia U18	3	(4)
2017–2018	Malaysia U19	6	(6)
- * Club domestic league appearances and goals

Muhammad Zafuan bin Azeman (Jawi: ممحمد زافوان بن ازيمن, IPA: [Muhammad Zafuan bɪn 'Azeman]; born 10 June 1999) is a Malaysian professional footballer who plays as a forward and former young player of the Malaysia under-18 national team.

== Early career ==
Zafuan Azeman started his youth career with Bukit Jalil Sports School.

== Club career ==
=== Kedah ===
In November 2017, Zafuan signed a one-year contract for Kedah in the Malaysia Super League. Under the management of Ramón Marcote Pequeño, he only made 2 appearances with the club and didn't scored any goal for Kedah.

=== Perlis FA ===
In January 2019, Zafuan signed for Malaysia Premier League side Perlis. He joined the team from Kedah on a free transfer. In the 2019 season, he made 20 appearances for the club and score 4 goals for Perlis.

=== Angthong ===
In September 2019, Zafuan signed a two-year contract with Angthong in the Thai League 3; following financial issues, his contract was terminated on 11 May 2020.

=== Penang ===
Zafuan returned to Malaysia on 10 January 2021, joining Penang ahead of the 2021 Malaysia Super League. On 20 March 2021, Zafuan made his debut in a 0–2 win over Selangor F.C. in the Malaysia Super League. Zafuan made his team debut when he came on as a substitute in the 92nd minute replacing Casagrande (footballer).

Under the management of Tomáš Trucha, he made 3 appearances with Penang before joining Kelantan United on the 2nd transfer window.

==== Kelantan United ====
On 25 May 2021, Zafuan joined fellow Malaysia Premier League club Kelantan United on loan from Penang.

He made 6 appearances with the club and score 1 goal. He collected a total of 305 minutes played for the club.

=== Uthai Thani ===
In January 2023, Zafuan joined Uthai Thani in the Thai League 2.

On 15 January 2023, Zafuan made his Thai League 2 debut by coming off the bench in Uthai Thani's 1–1 draw against Chiangmai United F.C. He got subbed in 79th minutes replacing Kittisak Phutchan. On 27 May 2023, Uthai Thani won the Final Thai League 2 Playoff in a 5-2 aggregate against Customs United. Uthai Thani successfully promoted to the 2023–24 Thai League 1.

=== Perlis United ===
On 2 June 2023, a Malaysia M3 League side Perlis United signed Zafuan Azeman when the Malaysia League 2nd transfer window opened. He left Uthai Thani after the club got promoted to Thai League 1.

=== Uthai Thani ===
In January 2024, Zafuan Azeman signed back with Uthai Thani that currently playing in Thai League 1. He joined the team after confirming that he is a Malaysia-Thailand mix blood player and able to qualify to join the first division.

=== Pattani ===
In December 2024, Zafuan Azeman signed for Thai League 3 club Pattani from Uthai Thani on free transfer.

== Personal life ==
In 2025, Zafuan Azeman announced that he will stop playing professional and retired from football after the 2024/25 season after leaving Pattani.

He now retired and want to focus on his new business in F&B as he opened his own cafe "Kafe Tenang" located in Kangar, Perlis.

== International career ==
=== Malaysia U-18 ===
In 2017, Zafuan Azeman got his first international called up for Malaysia U-18. With the Malaysia U-18 squad, he made 3 appearances and scored 1 goal with the national team.

=== Malaysia U-19 ===
In 2018, Zafuan was called up for Malaysia U-19 squad for 2018 AFF U-19 Youth Championship in July 2018 and 2018 AFC U-19 Championship in October 2018. He made 6 appearances with the team and scored 1 goal for Malaysia U-19.

== Career statistics ==
=== Club ===
As of the 10 June 2023.

Club	Season	League			Cup		League Cup		Continental (Note: Includes cup competitions such as the AFC Champions Cup, and AFC Cup)		Total	
Club	Season	Division	Apps	Goals	Apps	Goals	Apps	Goals	Apps	Goals	Apps	Goals
Kedah	2018	Malaysia Super League	2	0	0	0	0	0	0	0	2	0
Perlis	2019	Malaysia Premier League	16	4	2	0	2	0	0	0	20	4
Angthong	2019	Thai League 3	7	0	2	1	1	0	0	0	10	0
Angthong	2020-21	Thai League 3	2	0	0	0	0	0	0	0	2	0
Angthong	Total		9	0	2	1	1	0	0	0	12	1
Penang	2021	Malaysia Super League	1	0	2	0	0	0	0	0	3	0
Penang	2022	Malaysia Super League	0	0	0	0	0	0	0	0	0	0
Penang	Total		1	0	2	0	0	0	0	0	3	0
Kelantan United	2021	Malaysia Premier League	3	0	3	1	0	0	0	0	6	1
Uthai Thani	2022–23	Thai League 2	4	0	1	0	0	0	0	0	5	0
Perlis United	2023	Malaysia M3 League	4	1	0	0	0	0	0	0	4	1
Uthai Thani	2023–2024	Thai League 1	0	0	1	0	0	0	0	0	1	0
Career Total			39	5	11	2	3	0	0	0	53	7

== Honours ==
Malaysia U19

- AFF U-19 Youth Championship: 2018
