= Hidhir Idris =

Malaysian footballer

Personal information
- Full name: Mohammad Hidhir bin Sabran
- Date of birth: 29 May 1997 (age 29)
- Place of birth: Alor Setar, Malaysia
- Height: 1.67 m (5 ft 6 in)
- Position: Winger

Team information
- Current team: PDRM
- Number: 11

Youth career
- 2014–2017: Kedah Darul Aman U21

Senior career*
| Years | Team | Apps | (Gls) |
| 2017– | Kedah Darul Aman | 19 | (0) |
| 2020–2021 | → PDRM (loan) | 21 | (1) |
| 2022–2023 | → Kuching City (loan) | 0 | (0) |
| 2023 | Kuching City | 0 | (0) |
| 2024– | PDRM | 0 | (0) |
- * Club domestic league appearances and goals as of 7 August 2021

Mohammad Hidhir bin Sabran (born 29 May 1997) is a Malaysian professional footballer who plays as a winger for PDRM.

== Club career ==
=== Kedah ===
On 9 September 2017, Hidhir made his first-team debut for 2017 season coming on as a substitute for Syazuan Hazani in the 75th minute of 2–0 win at Darul Aman.

== Career statistics ==
=== Club ===
As of 16 August 2019

| Club | Season | League | | Cup | | League Cup | | Continental | | Total | |
| Club | Season | Apps | Goals | Apps | Goals | Apps | Goals | Apps | Goals | Apps | Goals |
|---|---|---|---|---|---|---|---|---|---|---|---|
| Kedah Darul Aman | 2017 | 1 | 0 | 0 | 0 | 1 | 0 | – | | 2 | 0 |
| Kedah Darul Aman | 2018 | 6 | 0 | 0 | 0 | 2 | 0 | – | | 8 | 0 |
| Kedah Darul Aman | 2019 | 12 | 0 | 1 | 0 | 1 | 0 | – | | 14 | 0 |
| Kedah Darul Aman | Total | 19 | 0 | 1 | 0 | 4 | 0 | 0 | 0 | 23 | 0 |
| PDRM (loan) | 2020 | 3 | 0 | 0 | 0 | 0 | 0 | – | | 3 | 0 |
| PDRM (loan) | 2021 | 18 | 1 | 0 | 0 | 0 | 0 | – | | 18 | 1 |
| PDRM (loan) | Total | 21 | 1 | 0 | 0 | 0 | 0 | 0 | 0 | 21 | 1 |
| Kuching City (loan) | 2022 | 0 | 0 | 0 | 0 | 0 | 0 | – | | 0 | 0 |
| Kuching City (loan) | Total | 0 | 0 | 0 | 0 | 0 | 0 | 0 | 0 | 0 | 0 |
| Career total | | 19 | 0 | 1 | 0 | 4 | 0 | 0 | 0 | 23 | 0 |

== Honours ==
=== Club ===
Kedah

- Malaysia FA Cup: 2019
