= Arham Khussyairi =

Malaysian footballer

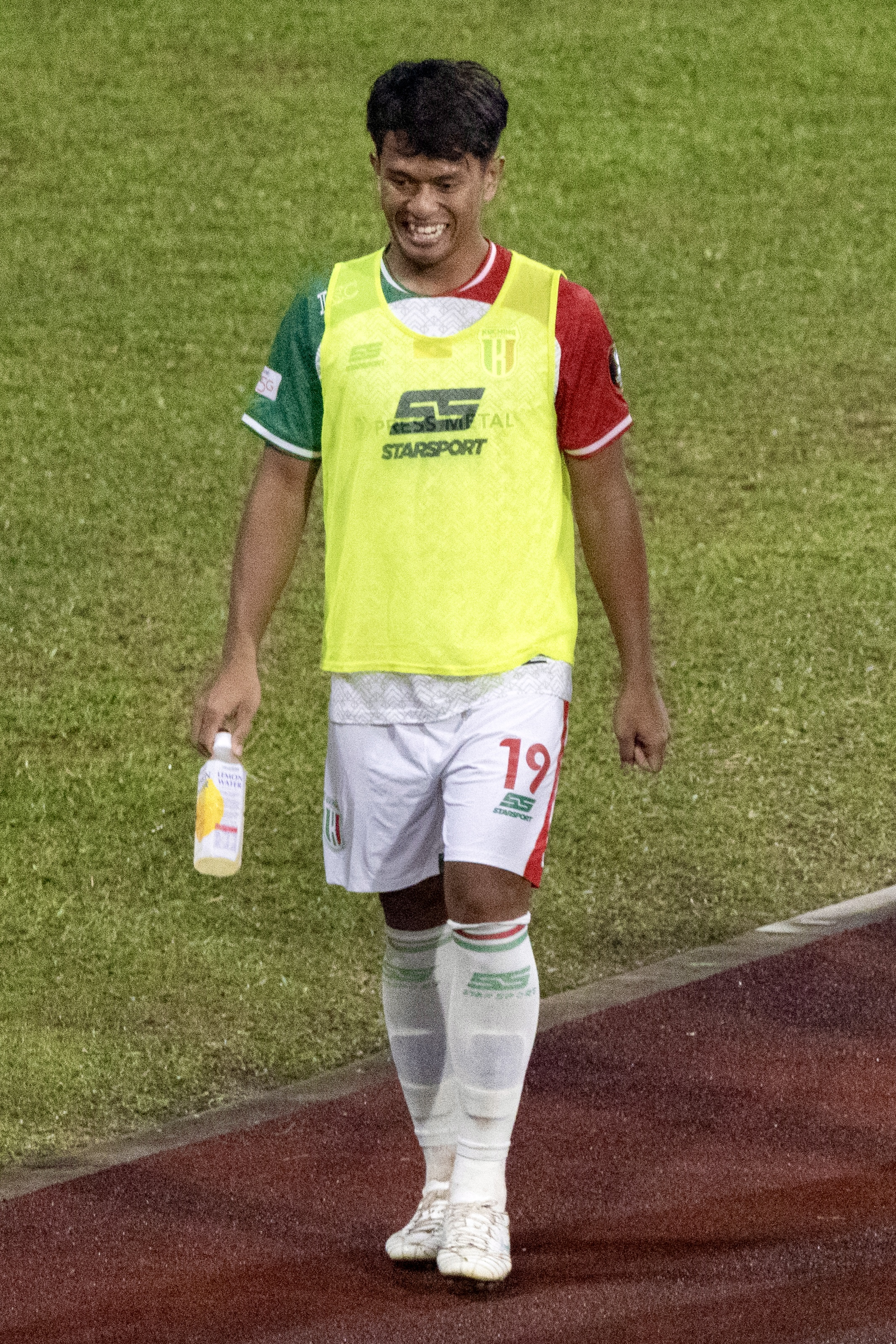
- Arham with Kuching City in 2025

Personal information
- Full name: Arham Khussyairi bin Ab Wahab
- Date of birth: 26 January 2001 (age 25)
- Place of birth: Terengganu, Malaysia
- Position: Midfielder

Team information
- Current team: Kelantan Red Warrior
- Number: 4

Youth career
- Malaysia Pahang Sports School
- 2019–2020: UiTM U21

Senior career*
Years	Team	Apps	(Gls)
2019–2022	UiTM	14	(0)
2023–2025	Kuching City	15	(0)
2025–	Kelantan Red Warrior	1	(1)
- * Club domestic league appearances and goals as of 22 August 2025

Arham Khussyairi bin Ab Wahab (born 26 January 2001) is a Malaysian professional footballer who plays as a midfielder for Malaysia A1 Semi-Pro League club Kelantan Red Warrior.

== Club career ==
=== UiTM ===
Arham started his career with UiTM, whom Arham has also captained.

=== Kuching City ===
On 8 January 2023, Arham signed a contract with Malaysia Super League club Kuching City. On 26 February 2023, Arham made his debut for the club in a 2–1 win over Kelantan.

== International career ==
Arham has expressed interest in representing the Malaysia national team.

== Style of play ==
Arham can operate as a defender or midfielder and is known for his ability to make overlaps.
