= Asyraaf Omar =

Malaysian association football player

Personal information
- Full name: Ahmad Asyraaf bin Omar
- Date of birth: 12 September 1994 (age 32)
- Place of birth: Malaysia
- Height: 1.82 m (6 ft 0 in)
- Position: Goalkeeper

Team information
- Current team: Kuala Lumpur City
- Number: 30

Youth career
- Perak

Senior career*
Years	Team	Apps	(Gls)
2016–2019	PKNP	33	(0)
2020	Kuala Lumpur Rovers		
2021	Penang	0	(0)
2022	Melaka United	2	(0)
2023	Kelantan United	9	(0)
2024–2025	Kuala Lumpur Rovers	0	(0)
2025–	Kuala Lumpur City	0	(0)
- * Club domestic league appearances and goals as of 2 March 2022

Ahmad Asyraaf bin Omar (born 12 September 1994) is a Malaysian footballer who plays as a goalkeeper for Malaysia Super League club Kuala Lumpur City.
