= Sudi Abdallah =

Burundian footballer (born 2000)

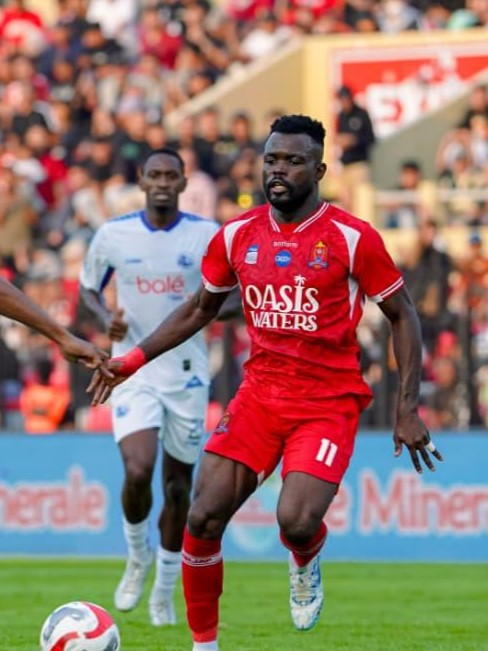
- Abdallah playing for Persijap Jepara in 2025

Personal information
- Full name: Mike Sudi Abdallah
- Date of birth: 5 January 2000 (age 26)
- Place of birth: Buyenzi, Burundi
- Height: 1.86 m (6 ft 1 in)
- Position: Forward

Team information
- Current team: Araz-Naxçıvan
- Number: 19

Senior career*
Years	Team	Apps	(Gls)
2018–2019	Vital'O		
2019–2021	AS Kigali		
2021–2022	Al-Faisaly		
2022	Muktijoddha Sangsad	9	(6)
2022	Al-Naft	1	(1)
2023	Kuching City	7	(1)
2023–2024	Al-Ittihad Almisraty	20	(5)
2024–2025	PSIS Semarang	17	(5)
2025–2026	Persijap Jepara	29	(5)
2026–	Araz-Naxçıvan	4	(0)

International career^{‡}
2022–	Burundi	15	(3)
- * Club domestic league appearances and goals as of 6 September 2026 ‡ National team caps and goals as of 9 September 2025

Mike Sudi Abdallah (born 5 January 2000) is a Burundian professional footballer who plays as a forward for Azerbaijan Premier League club Araz-Naxçıvan and the Burundi national team.

== Club career ==
In 2020, Abdallah signed for Rwandan side AS Kigali. In 2021, he signed for Al-Faisaly in Jordan. In 2022. he signed for Bangladeshi club Muktijoddha Sangsad.

Abdallah also signed for Bashundhara Kings, on loan from Muktijoddha, to play in 2022 AFC Cup. However, he didn't make any appearance as he couldn't reach the host country due to visa issues and his team Bashundhara being eliminated from group stage. He returned to Muktijoddha after finishing the tournament within a month.

=== PSIS Semarang ===
On 7 July 2024, PSIS Semarang recruited Abdallah ahead of the start of the 2024–25 Liga 1 competition. The player, who is also still active in the Burundi national team, is expected by the coaching team to be able to become PSIS's striker on the front lines. Sudi made his debut on 11 August 2024 in a match against Persita Tangerang at the Moch. Soebroto Stadium, Magelang. In the match, Sudi suffered a misalignment in the first half and had to be replaced by Wildan Ramdhani in the 37th minute.

=== Persijap Jepara ===
On 2 July 2025, Abdallah joined recently promoted Super League club Persijap Jepara.

On 18 August 2025, Abdallah scored his first and the winning goal for the club against the reigning champion Persib Bandung in the final minutes, after conceding a minute earlier.

== Career statistics ==
=== International ===
As of match played 9 September 2025

Burundi national team
Year	Apps	Goals
2022	4	0
2023	1	1
2024	5	2
2025	5	0
Total	15	3

=== International goals ===
Scores and results list Burundi's goal tally first.

No.	Date	Venue	Opponent	Score	Result	Competition
1.	16 November 2023	Benjamin Mkapa Stadium, Dar es Salaam, Tanzania	Gambia	3–1	3–2	2026 FIFA World Cup qualification
2.	7 June 2024	Bingu National Stadium, Lilongwe, Malawi	Kenya	1–1	1–1	2026 FIFA World Cup qualification
3.	11 June 2024	Stade Municipal de Berkane, Berkane, Morocco	Seychelles	1–0	3–1	2026 FIFA World Cup qualification
