= Yan Victor =

Brazilian footballer

Personal information
- Full name: Yan Victor Silva Paixão
- Date of birth: 18 September 1995 (age 31)
- Place of birth: Salvador, Brazil
- Height: 1.89 m (6 ft 2 in)
- Position: Centre-back

Team information
- Current team: Sukhothai

Senior career*
Years	Team	Apps	(Gls)
2016	São José	17	(2)
2016–2017	Gil Vicente	10	(1)
2017–2018	Marinhense	21	(1)
2018–2021	Cova da Piedade	27	(0)
2021–2022	Botafogo-SP	15	(0)
2022	Caxias	2	(0)
2022	Chungbuk Cheongju	9	(0)
2023	Kelantan United	15	(1)
2023–2024	Persebaya Surabaya	17	(1)
2024	Al-Kahrabaa	1	(0)
2025	Paraná	2	(0)
2026	Luverdense	12	(0)
2026	América (Rio de Janeiro)	8	(1)
2026–	Sukhothai	0	(0)
- * Club domestic league appearances and goals as of 28 April 2024

Yan Victor Silva Paixão (born 18 September 1995) is a Brazilian professional footballer who plays as a centre-back for Thai League 1 club Sukhothai.

== Club career ==
He made his professional debut in the Segunda Liga for Gil Vicente on 27 November 2016 in a game against Porto B.
