= Devid (footballer) =

Brazilian footballer (born 1996)

Personal information
- Full name: Devid de Santana Silva
- Date of birth: 28 March 1996 (age 30)
- Place of birth: Alagoinhas, Brazil
- Height: 1.90 m (6 ft 3 in)
- Position: Forward

Team information
- Current team: Hellas Syros
- Number: 77

Senior career*
Years	Team	Apps	(Gls)
2014–2016	Catuense	3	(0)
2016–2019	Avaí	5	(0)
2018	→ Genus (loan)	0	(0)
2019	→ Metropolitano (loan)	0	(0)
2019–2020	Londrina	3	(1)
2019	→ Foz do Iguaçu (loan)	5	(0)
2020–2021	Kastrioti	29	(10)
2021	Covilhã	11	(0)
2022	Tirana	15	(2)
2023	Kelantan United	14	(4)
2023–2024	Barito Putera	8	(0)
2024–2025	Doxa Katokopias	21	(10)
2025–	Hellas Syros	7	(0)
- * Club domestic league appearances and goals as of 7 December 2025

Devid de Santana Silva (born 28 March 1996), is a Brazilian professional footballer who plays as a forward for Super League Greece 2 club Hellas Syros.

== Career ==
=== Catuense ===
Devid made his league debut for Catuense against Galícia on 19 February 2014.

=== Avaí ===
Devid made his league debut for Avaí against SC Internacional on 24 April 2016.

=== Londrina ===
Devid made his league debut for Londrina against Maringá on 20 March 2019. He scored his first goal for the club against Coritiba on 7 April 2019, scoring in the 22nd minute.

=== Foz do Iguaçu ===
Devid made his league debut for Foz do Iguaçu against Brusque on 12 May 2019.

=== Kastrioti ===
Devid joined Kastrioti in 2020. He scored on his league debut for Kastrioti against Partizani Tirana on 4 November 2020, scoring in the 20th minute.

=== Covilhã ===
Devid made his league debut for Covilhã against Benfica B on 11 September 2021.

=== Tirana ===
Devid made his league debut for Tirana against Dinamo City on 24 January 2022. He scored his first goal for the club against Skënderbeu Korçë on 5 February 2022, scoring in the 50th minute.

=== Kelantan United ===
Devid made his league debut for Kelantan United against Selangor on 26 February 2023. He scored his first goal for the club against Kedah on 13 March 2023, scoring in the 21st minute.

=== Barito Putera ===
Devid made his league debut for Barito Putera against PSS Sleman on 26 November 2023.

== Honours ==
=== Club ===
Tirana

- Kategoria Superiore: 2021–22
