= Faiz Wan Sulaiman =

Malaysian footballer

Personal information
- Full name: Wan Mohammad Faiz bin Wan Sulaiman
- Date of birth: 11 July 1992 (age 34)
- Place of birth: Kelantan, Malaysia
- Height: 1.70 m (5 ft 7 in)
- Position: Midfielder

Team information
- Current team: AAK
- Number: 28

Senior career*
Years	Team	Apps	(Gls)
2017–2021	UKM		
2021–2023	Penang	5	(0)
2023	Kuching	6	(0)
2024–	AAK Puncak Alam		
- * Club domestic league appearances and goals

Wan Mohammad Faiz bin Wan Sulaiman (born 11 July 1992) is a Malaysian professional footballer who plays as a midfielder for Malaysia A2 Amateur League club AAK Puncak Alam.
