= Fikri Che Soh =

Malaysian footballer

Personal information
- Full name: Mohammad Fikri bin Che Soh
- Date of birth: 1 February 1998 (age 28)
- Place of birth: Kota Bharu, Malaysia
- Height: 1.80 m (5 ft 11 in)
- Position: Goalkeeper

Team information
- Current team: Kelantan The Real Warriors
- Number: 33

Youth career
- 2017: Kelantan

Senior career*
Years	Team	Apps	(Gls)
2018–2020	Kelantan	17	(0)
2019	→ Perlis (loan)		
2021–2022	Kelantan United	33	(0)
2023	Kedah Darul Aman	0	(0)
2024–	Kelantan The Real Warriors	10	(0)
- * Club domestic league appearances and goals

Mohammad Fikri bin Che Soh (born 1 February 1998) is a Malaysian professional footballer who plays for Malaysia Super League club Kelantan The Real Warriors as a goalkeeper.

== Club career ==
=== Kelantan ===
Fikri began his career playing for Kelantan youth team. He has been promoted into senior team and made his debut for Kelantan in 1–1 draw against Negeri Sembilan on 14 April 2018.

== Career statistics ==
=== Club ===
As of match played 29 January 2023

Appearances and goals by club, season and competition
Club	Season	League			Cup		League Cup		Continental/Other		Total	
Club	Season	Division	Apps	Goals	Apps	Goals	Apps	Goals	Apps	Goals	Apps	Goals
Kelantan	2018	Malaysia Super League	8	0	0	0	0	0	–		8	0
Kelantan	2019	Malaysia Premier League	4	0	0	0	4 (Note: Appearances in MFL Challenge Cup)	0	–		8	0
Kelantan	2020	Malaysia Premier League	5	0	0	0	1 (Note: Appearances in Malaysia Cup)	0	–		6	0
Kelantan	Total		17	0	0	0	5	0	–	–	22	0
Kelantan United	2021	Malaysia Premier League	16	0	–		4 (Note: Appearances in Malaysia Cup)	0	–		20	0
Kelantan United	2022	Malaysia Premier League	17	0	2 (Note: Appearances in Malaysia FA Cup)	0	2 (Note: Appearances in Malaysia Cup)	0	–		21	0
Kelantan United	Total		33	0	2	0	6	0	–	–	41	0
Kedah Darul Aman	2023	Malaysia Super League	0	0	0	0	0	0	–		0	0
Kedah Darul Aman	Total		0	0	0	0	0	0	–	–	0	0
Kelantan The Real Warriors	2024–25	Malaysia Super League	10	0	0	0	2	0	1 (Note: Appearances in MFL Challenge Cup)	0	13	0
Kelantan The Real Warriors	2025–26	Malaysia Super League	0	0	0	0	0	0	–		0	0
Kelantan The Real Warriors	Total		0	0	0	0	0	0	–	–	0	0
Career Total			50	0	2	0	7	0	–	–	59	0
