= Ariusdius Jais =

Malaysian footballer

Personal information
- Full name: Ariusdius Jais
- Date of birth: 7 July 1998 (age 28)
- Place of birth: Sabah, Malaysia
- Height: 1.68 m (5 ft 6 in)
- Position: Midfielder

Youth career
- Sabah

Senior career*
Years	Team	Apps	(Gls)
2020–2021	Sabah		
2021–2022	→ Kelantan United	10	(0)
2022–2023	→ Kinabalu Jaguar FC	38	(4)

International career
2019	Malaysia U22		
- * Club domestic league appearances and goals

Ariusdius Jais (born 7 July 1998) is a Malaysian professional professional footballer who plays as a midfielder.

On 28 May 2021, Ariusdius signed to Kelantan United on loan deals.

Ariusdius represented Malaysia at 2019 AFF U-22 Youth Championship.
