= Rames Lai Ban Huat =

Malaysian footballer (born 1980)

Ramesh Lai
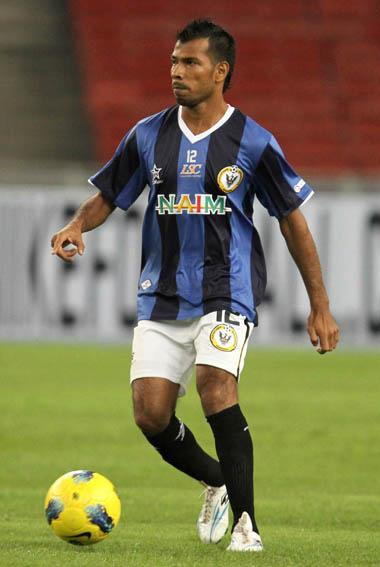

Personal information
- Full name: Ramesh a/l Lai Ban Huat
- Date of birth: 8 April 1980 (age 46)
- Place of birth: Perak, Malaysia
- Height: 1.67 m (5 ft 5 1/2 in)
- Position: Defender

Team information
- Current team: Machan F.C.

Youth career
- 2000: Perak
- 2001: Melaka

Senior career*
Years	Team	Apps	(Gls)
2002–2006	Telekom Melaka	?	(1)
2007–2010	KL PLUS	?	(0)
2011	FELDA United	17	(0)
2012–2018	Sarawak	135	(0)
2019–2024	Kuching City	81	(1)
2024–2025	Machan F.C.	1	(0)
- * Club domestic league appearances and goals

Ramesh a/l Lai Ban Huat (Tamil: ரமேஷ் லாய் பான் ஹுவாத், romanized: Ramēṣ lāy pāṉ huvāt; simplified Chinese: 拉梅什·莱班发; traditional Chinese: 拉梅什·萊班發; born 8 April 1980 in Perak) is a former Malaysian footballer. He is of Chindian descent.

== Career ==
Ramesh started his career with Telekom Melaka in 2002. He played under the guidance of Irfan Bakti Abu Salim where they finished as the runners-up of the 2005 Malaysia Premier League, finished second in the 2005–06 Malaysia Super League and reached the 2006 Malaysia Cup semi-final.

After the disbandment of Telekom Melaka, he moved to KL PLUS in 2007 and spent 3 seasons helping the club be promoted to the 2009 Malaysia Super League. After the disbandment of KL PLUS, Rajes signed with FELDA United for one year and played 17 league matches.

In 2012, Rajes moved to Sarawak. He spent the season as a regular, playing 32 matches in all competitions, but could not prevent Sarawak from relegation. In 2013, he played 33 matches in all competitions for Sarawak. Sarawak went on to win the Malaysia Premier League undefeated and reach the Malaysia Cup semi-final.

In the 2023 Malaysian league season, Rames created a record as the oldest player and the oldest goal scorer in the Malaysia League at the age of 43.

== Career statistics ==
=== Club ===
As of 17 December 2023

Club	Season	League		Cup		League Cup		Others		Total	
Club	Season	Apps	Goals	Apps	Goals	Apps	Goals	Apps	Goals	Apps	Goals
Telekom Melaka	2002		1		0		1	–			2
Telekom Melaka	2003		0		0		0	–			0
Telekom Melaka	2004		0		0		0	1 (Note: Appearances at the 2004 Malaysia Premier League Final)	0		0
Telekom Melaka	2005		0		0		0	–			0
Telekom Melaka	2006		0		0		0	–			0
Total			1		0		1	1	0		2
KL PLUS	2007		0		0		0	–			0
KL PLUS	2008		0		0		0	–			0
KL PLUS	2009		0		0		0	–			0
KL PLUS	2010		0		0		0	–			0
Total			0		0		0	–			0
FELDA United	2011	17	0	3	0	7	0	–		27	0
Total		17	0	3	0	7	0	–		27	0
Sarawak	2012	25	0	1	0	5	0	1 (Note: Appearances at the 2012 Malaysia Super League Play-offs)	0	32	0
Sarawak	2013	21	0	2	0	10	0	–		33	0
Sarawak	2014	18	0	4	0	4	0	–		26	0
Sarawak	2015	16	0	1	0	8	0	–		25	0
Sarawak	2016	18	0	1	0	3	0	–		22	0
Sarawak	2017	15	0	4	0	4	0	–		23	0
Sarawak	2018	22	0	1	0	–		3 (Note: Appearances at the 2018 Malaysia Challenge Cup)	0	26	0
Total		135	0	14	0	34	0	4	0	187	0
Kuching City	2019	14	0	2	0	–		–		16	0
Kuching City	2020	9	0	–		–		–		9	0
Kuching City	2021	19	0	–		5	0	–		24	0
Kuching City	2022	18	1	3	0	4	0	–		25	1
Kuching City	2023	21	0	1	0	2	1	3 (Note: Appearances at the 2023 MFL Challenge Cup)	0	27	1
Total		81	1	6	0	11	1	3	0	101	2
Career total											

== Honours ==
Sarawak

- Malaysia Premier League: 2013
