= Aylton Alemão =

Brazilian footballer (born 1988)

Personal information
- Full name: Aylton Ferreira Ananias
- Date of birth: 22 April 1988 (age 38)
- Place of birth: Mogi das Cruzes, Brazil
- Height: 1.86 m (6 ft 1 in)
- Position: Center-back

Youth career
- 2008: Campinense

Senior career*
Years	Team	Apps	(Gls)
2009–2010	CSP	29	(0)
2010–2011	Ypiranga-PE	30	(10)
2011–2012	Vitória da Conquista	7	(0)
2012–2013	Pelotas	12	(0)
2013	Salgueiro	17	(0)
2014–2015	Cabofriense	24	(0)
2015–2016	ASA	4	(0)
2016–2017	Khaitan	10	(1)
2017–2019	Seeb	36	(3)
2019–2020	Kelantan United	10	(0)
2021–2023	Kuching City	25	(1)
2023	SHB Da Nang	2	(0)
- * Club domestic league appearances and goals as of 21 March 2021

Aylton Ferreira Ananias (born 22 April 1988), known as Aylton Alemão, is a Brazilian footballer who last plays as a center-back for SHB Da Nang.

== Career ==
Born in Mogi das Cruzes, Aylton spent most of his playing career with clubs based in Alagoas and Pernambuco states. He has played in Brazil with Salgueiro Atlético Clube, Esporte Clube Primeiro Passo Vitória da Conquista, Associação Desportiva Cabofriense, Central and Agremiação Sportiva Arapiraquense, and in Oman with Seeb Club.

Aylton scored a goal for Salgueiro in an aggregate 1–4 defeat to Botofogo-PB in the semi-finals of 2013 Campeonato Brasileiro Série D, helping the club qualify for 2014 Campeonato Brasileiro Série C.
