= Julius Ofori =

Ghanaian footballer

Personal information
- Full name: Julius Ofori Ziggy
- Date of birth: 3 August 1999 (age 27)
- Place of birth: Kumasi, Ghana
- Position: Midfielder

Senior career*
Years	Team	Apps	(Gls)
2020–2021	Ashanti Gold	22	(7)
2021–2022	Energetik-BGU Minsk	10	(0)
2022	Kelantan United		
2023–2024	Asante Kotoko		
- * Club domestic league appearances and goals as of 31 December 2022

Julius Ofori (born 3 August 1999) is a Ghanaian professional footballer.
