= Evan Wensley =

Malaysian footballer

Personal information
- Full name: Evan Wensley Wenceslaus
- Date of birth: 15 August 1998 (age 28)
- Place of birth: Sabah, Malaysia
- Height: 1.73 m (5 ft 8 in)
- Position: Left-back

Team information
- Current team: Kelantan United
- Number: 88

Youth career
- Sabah

Senior career*
Years	Team	Apps	(Gls)
2019–2021	Sabah	13	(0)
2021	→ Kelantan United (loan)	8	(0)
2022	Kelantan United	11	(0)

International career^{‡}
2019	Malaysia U22		
- * Club domestic league appearances and goals as of 11 January 2023 ‡ National team caps and goals as of 11 August 2019

Evan Wensley Wenceslaus (born 15 August 1998) is a Malaysian professional footballer who plays as a left-back.

== Club career ==
=== Kelantan United (loan) ===
On 28 May 2021, Evan signed to Kelantan United on loan deals.

== International career ==
Evan represented Malaysia U22 at 2019 AFF U-22 Youth Championship.
