= Jacob Njoku =

Nigerian footballer

Personal information
- Full name: Jacob Njoku
- Date of birth: 16 November 1997 (age 28)
- Place of birth: Lagos, Nigeria
- Height: 1.78 m (5 ft 10 in)
- Position: Forward

Team information
- Current team: Mahibadhoo SC
- Number: 9

Senior career*
Years	Team	Apps	(Gls)
2016	Maccabi Petah Tikva	0	(0)
2016–2017	Beitar Tel Aviv Bat Yam	13	(6)
2017–2018	Ironi Kiryat Shmona	10	(0)
2017	→ Hapoel Ramat Gan (loan)	3	(0)
2017–2018	→ Hapoel Petah Tikva (loan)	2	(1)
2018–2019	Hapoel Nir Ramat HaSharon	4	(0)
2019	Dila Gori	8	(1)
2019–2020	Ceramica Cleopatra	2	(0)
2020	→ Al Mokawloon Al Arab (loan)	8	(4)
2020–2022	Suez	34	(22)
2022	Kelantan United	8	(6)
2023	Sabah	2	(0)
2025	Kasuka	2	(1)
2026–	Mahibadhoo	2	(1)
- * Club domestic league appearances and goals as of 11 May 2026

Jacob Njoku (born 16 November 1997) is a Nigerian professional footballer who plays as a forward for Mahibadhoo SC of the Maldivian Second Division.
