= Gabryel =

Brazilian footballer (born 1999)

Personal information
- Full name: Gabryel Monteiro de Andrade
- Date of birth: 9 April 1999 (age 27)
- Height: 1.79 m (5 ft 10 in)
- Position: Midfielder

Team information
- Current team: Al-Riffa SC

Youth career
- 2008–2010: Portuguesa
- 2011–2013: Santos
- 2014–2017: Taubaté
- 2017: Atlético Goianiense

Senior career*
Years	Team	Apps	(Gls)
2017–2019	Austria Lustenau	6	(0)
2017	→ USV Eschen/Mauren (loan)	6	(1)
2022	Kuching City	1	(0)
2023	Schwarz-Weiß Bregenz	20	(3)
2024	Dornbirn	12	(1)
2024–2025	SV Stripfing	31	(2)
2026–	Al-Riffa SC		
- * Club domestic league appearances and goals as of 17 May 2026

Gabryel Monteiro de Andrade (born 9 April 1999), known simply as Gabryel, is a Brazilian professional footballer who plays as a midfielder for Bahrian club Al-Riffa SC.

== Career ==
On 6 February 2024, Gabryel signed with Dornbirn in Austrian 2. Liga.

== Career statistics ==
=== Club ===
As of 10 December 2018

Club	Season	League			Cup		Continental		Other		Total	
Club	Season	Division	Apps	Goals	Apps	Goals	Apps	Goals	Apps	Goals	Apps	Goals
Austria Lustenau	2017–18	2. Liga	0	0	0	0	–		0	0	0	0
Austria Lustenau	2018–19	2. Liga	6	0	1 (Note: Appearances in the Austrian Cup)	0	–		0	0	7	0
Austria Lustenau	Total		6	0	1	0	0	0	0	0	7	0
Eschen/Mauren (loan)	2017–18	Swiss 1. Liga	6	1	1 (Note: Appearances in the Liechtenstein Football Cup)	2	–		0	0	7	3
Career total			12	1	2	2	0	0	0	0	14	3
