= Shuhei Fukai =

Japanese footballer (born 1993)

Shuhei Fukai 深井 脩平
Personal information
- Full name: Shuhei Fukai
- Date of birth: July 20, 1993 (age 33)
- Place of birth: Satte, Saitama, Japan
- Height: 1.82 m (5 ft 11 1/2 in)
- Position: Defender

Team information
- Current team: Kelantan United
- Number: 4

Youth career
- 2009–2011: Omiya Ardija Youth
- 2012–2015: Hokuriku University

Senior career*
Years	Team	Apps	(Gls)
2016–2018	Blaublitz Akita	40	(0)
2019	Iwate Grulla Morioka	24	(1)
2020	Vanraure Hachinohe	12	(1)
2021–2022	Kelantan United	38	(1)
- * Club domestic league appearances and goals as of 21 March 2022

Shuhei Fukai (深井 脩平, Fukai Shūhei; born July 20, 1993) is a Japanese football player.

== Career ==
Shuhei Fukai joined J3 League club Blaublitz Akita in 2016.

== Club statistics ==
Updated to 22 March 2018.

Club performance			League		Cup		Total	
Season	Club	League	Apps	Goals	Apps	Goals	Apps	Goals
Japan			League		Emperor's Cup		Total	
2016	Blaublitz Akita	J3 League	14	0	2	0	16	0
2017	Blaublitz Akita	J3 League	24	0	1	0	25	0
Total			38	0	3	0	41	0

== Honours ==
Blaublitz Akita

- J3 League (1): 2017
