= 2017 Sarawak FA season =

Sarawak
2017 season
- President: Abdullah Julaihi
- Manager: Pengiran Bala (from 14 July 2017)
- Stadium: Stadium Negeri
- Liga Super: Relegated
- FA Cup: Quarter-finals
- Malaysia Cup: Group stage
- Piala FA: Quarter-finals
- Top goalscorer: League: Mateo Roskam (9 goals); All: Mateo Roskam (13 goals)
- Highest home attendance: 8,011 vs Pahang (4 February 2017)
- Lowest home attendance: 761 vs Terengganu (18 July 2017)
- Average home league attendance: 17,051

The 2017 season was Sarawak's 13th season in club history and 5th season in the Liga Super since being promoted in 2014.

== Season summary ==
After few seasons battle with bottom half finished, Bujang Senang finally bid farewell to the top flight after relegated. Bottom teams fate need to be decided until final day of the season. Kelantan did the great escape by winning 3–1 in Melaka thus secured 3 points to avoid relegation, meanwhilst Sarawak goalless draw with T Team saw the team down to Liga Perdana next term. Due to new rules and regulation regarding the FAM & AFC license requirement, Sarawak and Penang alongside Felda United and T-Team altogether 4 teams relegated to premier league for 2018.

Which saw Negeri Sembilan and PKNP promoted to 2018 super league replacing demoted T-team and Felda united. After Kuala Lumpur and Terengganu advanced as 2017 premier league winners and runners up. By following the AFC, FAM rules and condition Terengganu and T Team later rebrand as Terengganu FC II are disallowed to compete in same league/division since they acted as reserve team/feeder team to Terengganu FC I. The same law applied to JDT I and JDT II where they need to plays in different division to avoid matchfixing or conflict of interest.

Sarawak had bright campaign in FA Cup by trashing Misc Mifa 6–3 in second round, beating Perlis 2–1 in away fixture before drawn with Terengganu in quarterfinal, which saw them tied 2–2 on aggregate, only to be separated by penalty shoot out 4–1 win to the east coast team which saw Terengganu advanced to semi final against Kedah, eventual winner.

Dismal draw in Malaysia cup when Sarawak had to face 2 giants, JDT and Selangor, against with Terengganu in a group stage. Ngap sayot finished the group as expected in 3rd position with later winner, JDT and Selangor advanced to the next round.

== Highlight of the season ==
Sarawak welcoming the arrival of Demerson Bruno, the survival of Chapecoense team that scheduled to play in Copa Sudamericana final unfortunately involved in air disaster. Mark Hartmann also scored a wonderful goal against Misc Mifa during FA cup match that resemble to Papiss Cisse wonder goal against Chelsea in 2012, local crowd nominated that goal for Puskas Award but nothing further action were taken. Thus denying second consecutive time for Malaysia to win the award after Faiz Subri achievement.

=== Background information ===
Sarawak had their eyes on a promising season with transfers such as Mateo Roskam and Demerson coming to help aid them in reaching the top half of the table after the previous season's unimpressive 8th-place ranking.

== Competitions ==
=== Overview ===
| Competition | Record | | | | | | | |
| Competition | Pld | W | D | L | GF | GA | GD | Win % |
|---|---|---|---|---|---|---|---|---|
| Liga Super | 22 | 4 | 6 | 12 | 20 | 35 | −15 | 18.18 |
| FA Cup | 4 | 2 | 2 | 0 | 10 | 6 | +4 | 50.00 |
| Malaysia Cup | 6 | 1 | 2 | 3 | 6 | 12 | −6 | 16.67 |
| Total | 32 | 7 | 10 | 15 | 36 | 53 | −17 | 21.88 |

Source: Competitions

=== Liga Super ===
==== League table ====
| Pos | Team | Pld | W | D | L | GF | GA | GD | Pts | Qualification or relegation |
|---|---|---|---|---|---|---|---|---|---|---|
| 8 | Melaka United | 22 | 6 | 6 | 10 | 33 | 46 | −13 | 24 | |
| 9 | T–Team (R) | 22 | 7 | 5 | 10 | 30 | 45 | −15 | 23 (Note: Kelantan and T–Team was sentenced to a six-point deduction immediately on offense failed to complete the registration process Malaysian League (M-League) 2017. Later, upon careful consideration of the aforementioned appeals, Football Malaysia have decided to lift the transfer ban and reduce the deduction of 6 points to 3 points for T-Team.) | Relegation to Premier League |
| 10 | Kelantan | 22 | 7 | 4 | 11 | 31 | 39 | −8 | 22 (Note: Kelantan and T–Team was sentenced to a six-point deduction immediately on offense failed to complete the registration process Malaysian League (M-League) 2017. Later, upon careful consideration of the aforementioned appeals, Football Malaysia have decided to only reduce the deduction of 6 points to 3 points for Kelantan.) | |
| 11 | Sarawak (R) | 22 | 5 | 6 | 11 | 24 | 34 | −10 | 21 | Relegation to Premier League |
| 12 | Penang (R) | 22 | 3 | 3 | 16 | 16 | 43 | −27 | 12 | Relegation to Premier League |

Source: FAM, FMLLP
Rules for classification: 1) Points; 2) Goal difference; 3) Number of goals scored.
(R) Relegated

==== Matches ====
Win Draw Loss

| 21 January 2017 1 | T-Team (Terengganu) | 1–1 | Sarawak | Kuala Terengganu, Terengganu |
| 21:00 UTC+8 | Hakim 50' | Report | Roskam 80' | Stadium: Sultan Ismail Nasiruddin Shah Stadium; Attendance: 1,763; Referee: Zulkifli Ahmad |

| 27 January 2017 2 | Kedah | 3–2 | Sarawak | Alor Setar, Kedah |
| 21:00 UTC+8 | Baddrol 22'; Mendonça 71'; Syazwan 72' | Report | Hartmann 10'; Tommy 26' | Stadium: Darul Aman Stadium; Attendance: 25,000; Referee: Nagor Amir Noor Mohamed |

| 4 February 2017 3 | Sarawak | 0–1 | Pahang | Kuching, Sarawak |
| 20:15 UTC+8 | | Report | Dike 24' | Stadium: Sarawak State Stadium; Attendance: 8,011; Referee: S. Sittharanjanan |

| 11 February 2017 4 | Penang | 0–1 | Sarawak | Batu Kawan, Penang |
| 21:00 UTC+8 | | Report | Hartmann 72' | Stadium: Penang State Stadium; Attendance: 4,946; Referee: Nagor Amir Noor Mohamed |

| 18 February 2017 5 | Sarawak | 0–1 | (Malacca) Melaka United | Kuching, Sarawak |
| 20:15 UTC+8 | | Report | Jeon 14' | Stadium: Sarawak State Stadium; Attendance: 7,703++ Referee: Wan Mohamad Tarmizi |

| 25 February 2017 6 | PKNS (Selangor) | 2−3 | Sarawak | Shah Alam, Selangor |
| 16:45 UTC+8 | Espíndola 55'; Khairul 90+3' | Report | Roskam 18'; Hartmann 60'; Hafiz 63' | Stadium: Shah Alam Stadium; Attendance: 1,007; Referee: Suhaimi Mat Hassan |

| 28 February 2017 7 | Sarawak | 0–2 | Johor Darul Ta'zim | Kuching, Sarawak |
| 20:15 UTC+8 | | Report | Cabrera 9', 70' | Stadium: Sarawak State Stadium; Attendance: 6,153; Referee: S. Sittharanjanan |

| 4 March 2017 8 | FELDA United (Kuala Lumpur) | 2−0 | Sarawak | Jengka, Pahang |
| 21:00 UTC+8 | Cano 53'; Hadin 70' | Report | | Stadium: Tun Abdul Razak Stadium; Attendance: 1,552; Referee: Zamzaidi Katimin |

| 8 March 2017 9 | Selangor | 2−1 | Sarawak | Selayang, Selangor |
| 21:00 UTC+8 | Astafei 22'; Doe 49' | Report | Roskam 83' | Stadium: Majlis Perbandaran Selayang Stadium; Attendance: 2,928; Referee: Samsudin Ibrahim |

| 15 April 2017 10 | Sarawak | 3−3 | Perak | Kuching, Sarawak |
| 20:15 UTC+8 | Roskam 9'; Hairol 22'; Rahim 50' | Report | Toski 17'; Hafiz 20'; Hadi 73' | Stadium: Sarawak State Stadium; Attendance: 2,465; Referee: Khairul Azuan Kidam |

| 26 April 2017 11 | Sarawak | 0−0 | Kelantan | Kuching, Sarawak |
| 20:15 UTC+8 | | Report | | Stadium: Sarawak State Stadium; Attendance: 1,596; Referee: Zulkarnain Zakaria |

| 9 May 2017 12 | Sarawak | 1−1 | Selangor | Kuching, Sarawak |
| 20:15 UTC+8 | Roskam 33' | Report | Rizal Fahmi 44' | Stadium: Sarawak State Stadium; Attendance: 2,185; Referee: Khairul Azuan Kidam |

| 24 May 2017 13 | Perak | 0−0 | Sarawak | Ipoh, Perak |
| 21:00 UTC+8 | | Report | | Stadium: Perak Stadium; Attendance: 1,350; Referee: Wan Mohamad Tarmizi |

| 1 July 2017 14 | Kelantan | 0−2 | Sarawak | Kota Bharu, Kelantan |
| 21:00 UTC+8 | | Report | Demerson 22'; Roskam 35' | Stadium: Sultan Muhammad IV Stadium; Attendance: 1,251; Referee: Fitri Maskon |

| 11 July 2017 15 | Sarawak | 1−3 | (Kuala Lumpur) FELDA United | Kuching, Sarawak |
| 20:15 UTC+8 | Alif 70' | Report | Fernandes 10', 35', 55' | Stadium: Sarawak State Stadium; Attendance: 1,497; Referee: Muhd Rahmat Jantan |

| 15 July 2017 16 | Johor Darul Ta'zim | 3−1 | Sarawak | Larkin, Johor |
| 21:00 UTC+8 | Ghaddar 12', 75'; Safawi 78' | Report | Sahil 64' | Stadium: Tan Sri Dato' Haji Hassan Yunos Stadium; Attendance: 10,126; Referee: Mohd Zohri Tajuddin |

| 22 July 2017 17 | Sarawak | 0−1 | (Selangor) PKNS | Kuching, Sarawak |
| 20:15 UTC+8 | | Report | Alif 69' | Stadium: Sarawak State Stadium; Attendance: 1,211++ Referee: Suhaimi Mat Hassan |

| 26 July 2017 18 | Melaka United (Malacca) | 4−2 | Sarawak | Krubong, Melaka |
| 21:00 UTC+8 | Šimić 31'; Fauzi 35'; Surendran 39'; Felipe De Almeida Souza 90+3' | Report | Roskam 23'; Tommy 29' | Stadium: Hang Jebat Stadium; Attendance: 2,237; Referee: Wan Mohamad Tarmizi |

| 5 August 2017 19 | Sarawak | 2−0 | Penang | Kuching, Sarawak |
| 20:15 UTC+8 | Alif 51'; Kamaruddin 72' | Report | | Stadium: Sarawak State Stadium; Attendance: 1,214; Referee: Wan Mohamad Tarmizi |

| 20 September 2017 20 | Pahang | 3−0 | Sarawak | Kuantan, Pahang |
| 21:00 UTC+8 | Kogileswaran Raj 23'; Jayaseelan 28', 42' | Report | | Stadium: Darul Makmur Stadium; Attendance: 944; Referee: Muhd Rahmat Jantan |

| 27 September 2017 21 | Sarawak | 4−2 | Kedah | Kuching, Sarawak |
| 20:15 UTC+8 | Shamie 54'; Roskam 59', 64'; Hairol 77' | Report | Ilsø 9'; Baddrol 45+2' | Stadium: Sarawak State Stadium; Attendance: 1,162; Referee: Khairul Azuan Kidam |

| 28 October 2017 22 | Sarawak | 0−0 | (Terengganu) T-Team | Kuching, Sarawak |
| 20:15 UTC+8 | | Report | | Stadium: Sarawak State Stadium; Attendance: 2,009; Referee: Razlan Jeffri Ali |

Source: Fixtures / Result

=== FA Cup ===
Win Draw Loss

Knock-out stage

| 14 February 2017 Round of 32 | Sarawak | 6−3 | (Malaysia) MIFA | Kuching, Sarawak |
| 21:00 UTC+8 | Hartmann 12', 60', 81'; Roskam 24', 38'; Ronny 33' | Report | Ooi 57'; Ijezie , 70' (pen.), 78' (pen.) | Stadium: Sarawak State Stadium; Attendance: 1,798; Referee: Fitri Maskon |

| 11 March 2017 Round of 16 | Perlis | 1−2 | Sarawak | Kangar, Perlis |
| 16:15 UTC+8 | Oh 49' | Report | Rahim 26'; Hartmann 35' | Stadium: Tuanku Syed Putra Stadium; Attendance: 1,033; Referee: Nagor Amir Noor Mohamed |

Quarter-finals

| 1 April 2017 First Leg | Terengganu | 1−1 | Sarawak | Kuala Terengganu, Terengganu |
| 21:00 UTC+8 | Falcone 21' | Report | Lee Jong-ho 53' | Stadium: Sultan Ismail Nasiruddin Shah Stadium; Attendance: 5,500; Referee: Mohd Nafeez Abd Wahab |

| 21 April 2017 Second Leg | Sarawak | 1−1 (a.e.t.) (2−2 agg.) (1−4 p) | Terengganu | Petra Jaya, Sarawak |
| 20:15 UTC+8 | Demerson 80' | Report | Issey Nakajima-Farran 9' | Stadium: Sarawak State Stadium; Attendance: 4,527; Referee: Nagor Amir Noor Mohamed |
| | Penalties |
| | Mateo (penalty missed); Demerson (penalty missed); Shreen (penalty scored) | | (penalty scored) Issey; (penalty scored) Falcone; (penalty scored) Lazaro; (penalty scored) Parthiban |

=== Malaysia Cup ===
==== Group stage ====
| Pos | Team | Pld | W | D | L | GF | GA | GD | Pts | Qualification | JDT | SGR | SWK | TRG |
|---|---|---|---|---|---|---|---|---|---|---|---|---|---|---|
| 1 | Johor Darul Ta'zim | 6 | 4 | 1 | 1 | 16 | 4 | +12 | 13 | Advance to knockout phase | — | 3–1 | 4–0 | 5–0 |
| 2 | Selangor | 6 | 3 | 1 | 2 | 11 | 11 | 0 | 10 | Advance to knockout phase | 3–2 | — | 1–2 | 1–1 |
| 3 | Sarawak | 6 | 1 | 2 | 3 | 6 | 12 | −6 | 5 | | 0–2 | 1–2 | — | 0–0 |
| 4 | Terengganu | 6 | 0 | 4 | 2 | 6 | 12 | −6 | 4 | | 0–0 | 2–3 | 3–3 | — |

Updated to match(es) played on 9 September 2017. Source: FAM FMLLP

Win Draw Loss

| 4 July 2017 Group stage | Johor Darul Ta'zim | 4−0 | Sarawak | Larkin, Johor |
| 21:00 UTC+8 | Marcos António 12'; Guerra 27' (pen.), 73'; Insa 84' | Report | | Stadium: Tan Sri Dato' Haji Hassan Yunos Stadium; Attendance: 13,285; Referee: Mohd Zohri Tajuddin |

| 8 July 2017 Group stage | Sarawak | 1−2 | Selangor | Kuching, Sarawak |
| 20:15 UTC+8 | Shreen 82' | Report | Forkey Doe 39'; Dzulazlan 64' (o.g.) | Stadium: Sarawak State Stadium; Attendance: 2,000; Referee: Fitri Maskon |

| 18 July 2017 Group stage | Sarawak | 0−0 | Terengganu | Kuching, Sarawak |
| 20:15 UTC+8 | | Report | | Stadium: Sarawak State Stadium; Attendance: 761; Referee: Zulkarnain Zakaria |

| 29 July 2017 Group stage | Sarawak | 0−2 | Johor Darul Ta'zim | Kuching, Sarawak |
| 20:15 UTC+8 | | Report | Ghaddar 41'; Safiq 76' | Stadium: Sarawak State Stadium; Attendance: 1,102; Referee: Fitri Maskon |

| 2 August 2017 Group stage | Selangor | 1−2 | Sarawak | Selayang, Selangor |
| 21:00 UTC+8 | Ukah 37' | Report | Roskam 52'; Raičković 65' | Stadium: Selayang Stadium; Attendance: 1,721; Referee: Mohd Amirul Izwan Yaacob |

| 9 September 2017 Group stage | Terengganu | 3−3 | Sarawak | Kuala Terengganu, Terengganu |
| 21:00 UTC+8 | Nakajima-Farran 22'; Kipré 29', 43' | Report | Roskam 35'; Rahim 61'; Raičković 84' | Stadium: Sultan Ismail Nasiruddin Shah Stadium; Attendance: 543; Referee: Fitri Maskon |

== Statistics ==
=== Appearances ===
Correct as of match played on 28 October 2017

| No. | Pos. | Name | Liga Super | FA Cup | Malaysia Cup | Total |
|---|---|---|---|---|---|---|
| 1 | GK | (Malaysia) Florian Rison | 0 | 0 | 0 | 0 |
| 2 | DF | (Malaysia) Ronny Harun | 15 | 3 | 2 | 20 |
| 3 | DF | (Brazil) Demerson | 19 | 3 | 3 | 25 |
| 6 | DF | (Malaysia) Izray Roslan | 1 (3) | 0 | 1 | 2 (3) |
| 7 | MF | (Malaysia) Shamie Iszuan | 11 (5) | 0 | 3 (2) | 14 (7) |
| 8 | MF | (Malaysia) Tommy Mawat Bada | 21 | 3 | 4 | 28 |
| 9 | FW | (Croatia) Mateo Roskam | 21 | 3 | 2 (1) | 26 (1) |
| 11 | MF | (Malaysia) Hafiz Abu Bakar | 1 (9) | 1 (2) | 1 (1) | 3 (12) |
| 12 | DF | (Malaysia) Ramesh Lai | 14 (1) | 2 (1) | 4 | 20 (2) |
| 13 | DF | (Malaysia) Dzulazlan Ibrahim | 19 | 3 | 2 (1) | 24 (1) |
| 14 | DF | (Malaysia) Najmuddin | 0 | 0 | 0 | 0 |
| 16 | MF | (Malaysia) Shahrol Saperi | 5 (1) | 1 (1) | 2 (1) | 8 (3) |
| 17 | DF | (Malaysia) Hairol Mokhtar | 9+1) | 1 | 4 | 14 (1) |
| 18 | GK | (Malaysia) Zul Mohi | 0 | 0 | 0 | 0 |
| 20 | MF | (Malaysia) Shreen Tambi | 8 (7) | 0 (2) | 1 (2) | 9 (11) |
| 21 | GK | (Malaysia) Aidil Mohamad | 3 | 1 | 2 | 6 |
| 22 | DF | (Malaysia) Mazwandi | 11 (1) | 1 | 2 | 14 (1) |
| 23 | MF | (Malaysia) Dalglish | 1 (3) | 1 (1) | 0 (1) | 2 (5) |
| 24 | DF | (Malaysia) Dzulfadli Marajeh | 0 | 0 | 0 | 0 |
| 25 | GK | (Malaysia) Shahril Saa'ri | 19 | 2 | 4 | 25 |
| 26 | MF | (Malaysia) Alif Hassan | 7 (4) | 0 | 3 (2) | 10 (6) |
| 27 | FW | (Malaysia) Hafis Saperi | 0 (1) | 0 | 3 | 3 (1) |
| 28 | MF | (Malaysia) Kamaruddin Bohan | 6 (3) | 1 (1) | 3 (1) | 10 (5) |
| 29 | FW | (Malaysia) Alexander Jerome | 0 | 0 | 0 | 0 |
| 30 | MF | (Malaysia) Rahim Razak | 9 (10) | 2 | 5 (2) | 16 (12) |
| 32 | DF | (Malaysia) Jimmy Raymond | 2 (1) | 0 | 3 | 5 (1) |
| 34 | FW | (Malaysia) Azizi Ramlee | 0 | 0 | 0 (2) | 0 (2) |
| 35 | DF | (Malaysia) Rodney Akwensivie | 4 (2) | 0 | 4 | 8 (2) |
| 51 | FW | (Singapore) Sahil Suhaimi | 8+2) | 0 | 3 (1) | 11 (3) |
| 52 | MF | (Montenegro) Miloš Raičković | 10 | 0 | 5 (1) | 15 (1) |
Players who left the club in mid transfer window or on loan
| 10 | FW | (Philippines) Mark Hartmann | 9 (3) | 3 | 0 | 12 (3) |
| 19 | MF | (South Korea) Lee Jong-ho | 9 (1) | 2 (1) | 0 | 11 (2) |

=== Top scorers ===
Correct as of match played on 28 October 2017

The list is sorted by shirt number when total goals are equal.

| Rnk | No. | Player | Pos | Liga Super | FA Cup | Malaysia Cup | Total |
|---|---|---|---|---|---|---|---|
| 1 | 9 | (Croatia) Mateo Roskam | FW | 9 | 2 | 2 | 13 |
| 2 | 10 | (Philippines) **Mark Hartmann** | FW | 3 | 4 | 0 | 7 |
| 3 | 30 | (Malaysia) Rahim Razak | MF | 1 | 1 | 1 | 3 |
| 4 | 3 | (Malaysia) Demerson | DF | 1 | 1 | 0 | 2 |
| 4 | 8 | (Malaysia) Tommy Mawat Bada | MF | 2 | 0 | 0 | 2 |
| 4 | 17 | (Malaysia) Hairol Mokhtar | DF | 2 | 0 | 0 | 2 |
| 4 | 26 | (Malaysia) Alif Hassan | MF | 2 | 0 | 0 | 2 |
| 4 | 52 | (Montenegro) Miloš Raičković | MF | 0 | 0 | 2 | 2 |
| 9 | 2 | (Malaysia) Ronny Harun | DF | 0 | 1 | 0 | 1 |
| 9 | 7 | (Malaysia) Shamie Iszuan | MF | 1 | 0 | 0 | 1 |
| 9 | 11 | (Malaysia) Hafiz Abu Bakar | MF | 1 | 0 | 0 | 1 |
| 9 | 20 | (Malaysia) Shreen Tambi | MF | 0 | 0 | 1 | 1 |
| 9 | 28 | (Malaysia) Kamaruddin Bohan | MF | 1 | 0 | 0 | 1 |
| 9 | 51 | (Singapore) Sahil Suhaimi | FW | 1 | 0 | 0 | 1 |
| **Total** | | | | **24** | **9** | **6** | 39 |

* Player names in bold denotes player that left mid-season

=== Clean sheets ===
Correct as of match played on 28 October 2017

The list is sorted by shirt number when total clean sheets are equal.

| Rnk | No. | Player | Liga Super | FA Cup | Malaysia Cup | Total |
|---|---|---|---|---|---|---|
| 1 | 25 | (Malaysia) Shahril Saa'ri | 6 | 0 | 0 | 6 |
| 2 | 21 | (Malaysia) Aidil Mohamad | 0 | 0 | 1 | 1 |
| **Total** | | | **6** | **0** | **1** | **7** |

== Transfers ==
First transfer window started in December 2017 to 22 January 2017 and second transfer window will started on 15 May 2017 to 11 June 2017.

=== In ===
==== First window ====
| Date | Pos | Player | Transferred From |
|---|---|---|---|
| November 2016 | GK | (Malaysia) Aidil Mohamad | (Malaysia) Mukah |
| November 2016 | GK | (Malaysia) Zul Mohi | (Malaysia) Kuching |
| November 2016 | DF | (Malaysia) Izray Roslan | (Malaysia) Kuching |
| November 2016 | FW | (Malaysia) Hafiz Abu Bakar | (Malaysia) Kuching |
| November 2016 | DF | (Malaysia) Najmudin | (Malaysia) Sarikei |
| November 2016 | MF | (Malaysia) Azizi Ramlee | (Malaysia) Youth team |
| November 2016 | FW | (Malaysia) Rahim Razak | (Malaysia) Youth team |
| November 2016 | FW | (Philippines) Mark Hartmann | (Singapore) Geylang |
| November 2016 | FW | (South Korea) Lee Jong-ho | (Cambodia) Svay Rieng |
| 15 January 2017 | FW | (Croatia) Mateo Roskam | (Malaysia) Sime Darby |
| 15 January 2017 | FW | (Brazil) Demerson | (Brazil) Chapecoense |

==== Second window ====
| Date | Pos | Player | Transferred From |
|---|---|---|---|
| June 2017 | MF | (Montenegro) Miloš Raičković | (Montenegro) Budućnost Podgorica |
| June 2017 | FW | (Singapore) Sahil Suhaimi | (Singapore) Tampines Rovers |

=== Out ===
==== First window ====
| Date | Pos | Player | Transferred To |
|---|---|---|---|
| November 2016 | DF | (Malaysia) Thanaraj | Unattached |
| November 2016 | DF | (Malaysia) Riduwan Ma'on | Unattached |
| November 2016 | MF | (Malaysia) Gurusamy | (Malaysia) PKNS |
| November 2016 | MF | (Malaysia) Akmal Noor | (Malaysia) MOF |
| November 2016 | MF | (Papua New Guinea) Júnior | Unattached |
| November 2016 | FW | (Malaysia) Syahrul Azwari | (Malaysia) Johor Darul Ta'zim II |
| November 2016 | FW | (Malaysia) Partiban | (Malaysia) Terengganu |
| November 2016 | GK | (Malaysia) Iqbal Suhaimi | Unattached |
| December 2016 | DF | (Liberia) Teah Dennis Jr. | (Liberia) BYC |
| January 2017 | FW | (Brazil) Gilmar | (Brazil) Caxias do Sul |
| 9 February 2017 | FW | (Australia) Ndumba Makeche | (Indonesia) Bali United |

==== Second window ====
| Date | Pos | Player | Transferred To |
|---|---|---|---|
| June 2017 | FW | (Philippines) Mark Hartmann | (Malaysia) Penang |
| June 2017 | FW | (South Korea) Lee Jong-ho | Unattached |
