= 2016 Sarawak FA season =

Sarawak
2016 season
- President: Posa Majais
- Manager: Abdullah Julaihi
- Head Coach: David Usop
- Stadium: Sarawak State Stadium (Capacity: 26,000)
- Liga Super: 8th
- Piala FA: Second round
- Piala Malaysia: Group stage
- Top goalscorer: League: Ndumba Makeche (10); All: Ndumba Makeche (12)

The 2016 season was Sarawak's 4th season in Liga Super the top tier of Malaysian football since being promoted in 2014. Another gloomy season campaign for Bujang Senang after another trophy drought years. With improvement in league position by finishing 8th compared to previous season, but failed in both cup competitions, loss to Perak 3–1 in FA cup and finished bottom of the group in Malaysia Cup with later Champions, Kedah as group winner and behind feeder team, T team and JDT II.

With announcing former national head coach, Datuk K Rajagopal as new coach it seems like new beginning for Sarawak with the arrival of exciting young talent from national junior team, Syahrul Azwari. He 'rested' in May; in Malaysian football culture if the coach verified as 'rested' surely soon later he will be sacked and his contract terminated by mutual consent.

== Team Kit ==
After 5 years since 2011 played with red-black AC Milan strip for home games and blue-black Internazionale for away fixture. The management decided to re-introduce all red kit for home matches, the same pattern when the team kit was sponsored by Rossi during 2000's. Whereas, yellow neon kit introduced as away kit, the all black with tribal design was chosen for alternate or third kit.

== Players ==
=== First-team squad ===
As of 5 December 2015

Note: Flags indicate national team as defined under FIFA eligibility rules; some limited exceptions apply. Players may hold more than one non-FIFA nationality.

| No. | Pos. | Nation | Player |
|---|---|---|---|
| 1 | GK | (Malaysia) MAS | Florian Rison Laes |
| 2 | DF | (Malaysia) MAS | Ronny Harun |
| 3 | DF | (Malaysia) MAS | Ridwan Ma'on |
| 4 | DF | (Italy) ITA | Davide Grassi |
| 6 | MF | (Malaysia) MAS | K. Thanaraj |
| 7 | MF | (Malaysia) MAS | J. Partiban |
| 8 | MF | (Malaysia) MAS | Akmal Mohd Noor |
| 9 | MF | (Australia) AUS | Ndumba Makeche |
| 11 | MF | (Malaysia) MAS | Ashri Chuchu |
| 12 | DF | (Malaysia) MAS | Ramesh Lai |
| 13 | DF | (Malaysia) MAS | Dzulazlan Ibrahim |
| 15 | MF | (Malaysia) MAS | K. Gurusamy |
| 16 | MF | (Malaysia) MAS | Shahrol Saperi |
| 17 | DF | (Malaysia) MAS | Hairol Mokhtar |
| 18 | FW | (Malaysia) MAS | Syahrul Azwari (on loan from Kelantan) |

| No. | Pos. | Nation | Player |
|---|---|---|---|
| 19 | MF | (Timor-Leste) TLS | Juninho |
| 20 | FW | (Malaysia) MAS | Shreen Tambi |
| 21 | GK | (Malaysia) MAS | Iqbal Suhaimi |
| 22 | DF | (Malaysia) MAS | Mazwandi Zekeria |
| 23 | MF | (Malaysia) MAS | Dalglish Papin Test |
| 24 | DF | (Malaysia) MAS | Dzulfadli Awang Marajeh |
| 25 | GK | (Malaysia) MAS | Shahril Saa'ri |
| 26 | MF | (Malaysia) MAS | Alif Hassan |
| 27 | FW | (Malaysia) MAS | Hafis Saperi |
| 29 | DF | (Liberia) LBR | Teah Dennis |
| 30 | FW | (Brazil) BRA | Gilmar |
| 33 | MF | (Malaysia) MAS | Shamie Iszuan |
| 34 | MF | (Malaysia) MAS | Tommy Mawat Bada |
| 35 | DF | (Malaysia) MAS | Rodney Akwensivie |

== Transfers ==
=== 1st leg ===
In: Note: Flags indicate national team as defined under FIFA eligibility rules; some limited exceptions apply. Players may hold more than one non-FIFA nationality.

| No. | Pos. | Nation | Player |
|---|---|---|---|
| 1 | GK | (Malaysia) MAS | Florian Rison Laes (from youth) |
| 3 | DF | (Malaysia) MAS | Ridwan Ma'on (from ATM) |
| 4 | DF | (Italy) ITA | Davide Grassi (from (Romania) Rapid București) |
| 6 | MF | (Malaysia) MAS | K. Thanaraj (from Selangor) |
| 8 | MF | (Malaysia) MAS | Akmal Mohd Noor (from Negeri Sembilan) |
| 9 | MF | (Australia) AUS | Ndumba Makeche (from Felda United) |
| 15 | MF | (Malaysia) MAS | K. Gurusamy (from Selangor) |
| 18 | FW | (Malaysia) MAS | Syahrul Azwari (on loan from Kelantan) |
| 19 | MF | (Timor-Leste) TLS | Juninho (from (Brazil) Avaí) |
| 25 | GK | (Malaysia) MAS | Shahril Saa'ri (from T-Team) |
| 27 | FW | (Malaysia) MAS | Hafis Saperi (from youth) |
| 26 | MF | (Malaysia) MAS | Alif Hassan (from youth) |
| 30 | FW | (Brazil) BRA | Gilmar (from Kelantan) |
| 35 | DF | (Malaysia) MAS | Rodney Akwensivie (from youth) |

Out: Note: Flags indicate national team as defined under FIFA eligibility rules; some limited exceptions apply. Players may hold more than one non-FIFA nationality.

| No. | Pos. | Nation | Player |
|---|---|---|---|
| — | GK | (Malaysia) MAS | Fadzley Abdul Rahim (to Sabah) |
| — | GK | (Malaysia) MAS | Aidil Mohamad (to Mukah) |
| — | DF | (Liberia) LBR | Patrick Gerhardt (unattached) |
| — | DF | (Malaysia) MAS | A. Varathan (to Megah Murni) |
| — | MF | (Malaysia) MAS | Joseph Kalang (to Terengganu) |
| — | MF | (Malaysia) MAS | Sabri Sahar (to Negeri Sembilan) |
| — | MF | (Malaysia) MAS | G. Mahathevan (to Megah Murni) |
| — | MF | (Montenegro) MNE | Ivan Fatić (to (Bosnia and Herzegovina) Sloboda Tuzla) |
| — | FW | (Australia) AUS | Ryan Griffiths (to (Hong Kong) South China) |
| — | FW | (Republic of Ireland) IRL | Billy Mehmet (to (Singapore) Tampines Rovers) |
| — | FW | (Malaysia) MAS | Nazri Kamal (to DRB-HICOM) |
| — | FW | (Malaysia) MAS | Ikhwan Izzad (unattached) |

=== 2nd leg ===
In: Note: Flags indicate national team as defined under FIFA eligibility rules; some limited exceptions apply. Players may hold more than one non-FIFA nationality.

| No. | Pos. | Nation | Player |
|---|---|---|---|
| 29 | DF | (Liberia) LBR | Teah Dennis (from (Liberia) BYC) |

Out: Note: Flags indicate national team as defined under FIFA eligibility rules; some limited exceptions apply. Players may hold more than one non-FIFA nationality.

| No. | Pos. | Nation | Player |
|---|---|---|---|
| 4 | DF | (Italy) ITA | Davide Grassi (unattached) |

== Statistics ==
=== Top scorers ===
The list is sorted by shirt number when total goals are equal.

| Rnk | Pos | No. | Player | Liga Super | Piala FA | Piala Malaysia | Total |
|---|---|---|---|---|---|---|---|
| 1 | MF | 9 | (Australia) Ndumba Makeche | 10 | 0 | 2 | 12 |
| 2 | MF | 19 | (Timor-Leste) Juninho | 7 | 0 | 0 | 7 |
| 2 | FW | 30 | (Brazil) Gilmar | 7 | 0 | 0 | 7 |
| 4 | MF | 33 | (Malaysia) Shamie Iszuan | 2 | 0 | 2 | 4 |
| 5 | MF | 7 | (Malaysia) J. Partiban | 1 | 1 | 0 | 2 |
| 6 | MF | 15 | (Malaysia) K. Gurusamy | 1 | 0 | 0 | 1 |
| 6 | MF | 18 | (Malaysia) Syahrul Azwari | 1 | 0 | 0 | 1 |
| 6 | FW | 34 | (Malaysia) Tommy Mawat | 1 | 0 | 0 | 1 |
| # | Own goals | | | 2 | 0 | 0 | 2 |
| Total | | | | 32 | 1 | 4 | 37 |
