= 2015 Sarawak FA season =

Sarawak
2015 season
- President: Posa Majais
- Manager: Abdullah Julaihi
- Head Coach: K. Rajagopal
- Stadium: Sarawak State Stadium (Capacity: 26,000)
- Liga Super: 10th
- Piala FA: Round of 32
- Piala Malaysia: Quarter-finals
- Top goalscorer: Billy Mehmet (10)

The 2015 season was Sarawak's 3rd season in Liga Super the top tier of Malaysian football since being promoted in 2012. Ngap Sayot finished the season in 10th position since ATM and Sime Darby seems incompetent throughout the season. In domestic cup campaign the team went out early after loss to eventual finalist, kelantan in first round of FA cup and surprisingly passes the group stage of Piala Malaysia but loss with aggregate 2–3 to eventual winner, Selangor in quarterfinal.

== Players ==
=== First-team squad ===
As of 5 December 2015

Note: Flags indicate national team as defined under FIFA eligibility rules; some limited exceptions apply. Players may hold more than one non-FIFA nationality.

No.	Pos.	Nation	Player
—	GK	(Malaysia) MAS	Florian Rison Laes
—	GK	(Malaysia) MAS	Fadzley Rahim
—	GK	(Malaysia) MAS	Aidil Mohamad
—	GK	(Malaysia) MAS	Iqbal Suhaimi
—	DF	(Malaysia) MAS	Mazwandi Zekeria
—	DF	(Malaysia) MAS	Ronny Harun
—	DF	(Malaysia) MAS	Hairol Mokhtar
—	DF	(Malaysia) MAS	Ramesh Lai
—	DF	(Malaysia) MAS	Dzulazlan Ibrahim
—	DF	(Malaysia) MAS	Dzulfadli Awang Marajeh
—	DF	(Malaysia) MAS	A. Varathan
—	MF	(Malaysia) MAS	J. Partiban
—	MF	(Malaysia) MAS	Shahrol Saperi

No.	Pos.	Nation	Player
—	MF	(Malaysia) MAS	Ashri Chuchu
—	MF	(Malaysia) MAS	Dalglish Papin Test
—	MF	(Malaysia) MAS	Joseph Kalang
—	MF	(Malaysia) MAS	Nazri Kamal
—	MF	(Montenegro) MNE	Ivan Fatić
—	MF	(Malaysia) MAS	Sabri Sahar
—	MF	(Malaysia) MAS	G. Mahathevan
—	FW	(Malaysia) MAS	Shreen Tambi
—	FW	(Australia) AUS	Ryan Griffiths
—	FW	(Republic of Ireland) IRL	Billy Mehmet
—	FW	(Malaysia) MAS	Nicholas
—	FW	(Netherlands) NED	Ronald Hikspoors
