= 2024–25 Kuching City F.C. season =

Kuching City
2024–25 season
- Chairman: Fazzrudin Abdul Rahman
- CEO: Iswandi Ali Hassan
- Head coach: Aidil Sharin Sahak
- Stadium: Sarawak Stadium
- Malaysia Super League: 4th
- Malaysia FA Cup: Quarter-finals
- Malaysia Cup: Round of 16
- Top goalscorer: League: Jordan Mintah (13 goals); All: Jordan Mintah (14 goals)

The 2024–25 season was Kuching City's ninth year in existence and their second consecutive season in the top flight. The club participated in the Malaysia Super League, the Malaysia FA Cup and the Malaysia Cup.

== Coaching staff ==
- Head coach: Aidil Sharin Sahak
- Assistant head coach: Firdaus Morshidi
- Assistant coach: Zulkarnien Mohd Poasa
- Goalkeeper coach: Khairul Azman Mohamed
- Fitness coach: Aidil Idham Fadzil

== Players ==
=== First-team squad ===
Note: Flags indicate national team as defined under FIFA eligibility rules; some limited exceptions apply. Players may hold more than one non-FIFA nationality.

No.	Pos.	Nation	Player
1	GK	MAS	Uzair Zaidil
2	DF	MAS	Jimmy Raymond
3	DF	MAS	Rodney Celvin
6	DF	MAS	Arif Fadzilah (on loan from Terengganu)
7	FW	CIV	Kipré Tchétché
9	DF	MAS	Adam Shreen
10	MF	NAM	Petrus Shitembi
11	FW	MAS	Shamie Iszuan
12	MF	MAS	Abang Azri
13	DF	MAS	Dzulazlan Ibrahim
14	MF	MAS	Amir Amri
17	MF	MAS	Alauddin Farid
18	FW	MAS	Zahrul Nizwan
19	DF	MAS	Arham Khussyairi
20	GK	MAS	Shaiful Wazizi
21	MF	MAS	Danial Amier (on loan from Johor Darul Ta'zim)
22	DF	MAS	Hariz Mansor

No.	Pos.	Nation	Player
23	FW	MAS	Amirrul Iqmal
25	MF	BHR	Moses Atede
27	DF	MAS	Filemon Anyie
28	FW	GHA	Jordan Mintah
33	FW	MAS	Hazwan Bakri
35	DF	NGA	James Okwuosa
37	FW	MAS	Ramadhan Saifullah (on loan from Johor Darul Ta'zim)
38	GK	MAS	Wan Azraie
40	DF	MAS	Iskandar Shah
41	DF	MAS	Aiman Joanny
44	MF	MAS	Alif Hassan (captain)
50	MF	MAS	Diego Baggio
55	GK	MAS	Shahril Sa'ari
71	FW	MAS	Rahim Razak
77	DF	JPN	Yuki Tanigawa
88	FW	MAS	Zharmein Ashraf
91	MF	BRA	Nando Welter

== Competitions ==
=== Overview ===
Competition	First match	Last match	Starting round	Final position	Record							
Competition	First match	Last match	Starting round	Final position	Pld	W	D	L	GF	GA	GD	Win %
Malaysia Super League	12 May 2024	20 April 2025	Matchday 1	4th	24	10	9	5	38	28	+10	41.67
Malaysia FA Cup	14 June 2024	6 July 2024	Round of 16	Quarter-finals	3	2	0	1	7	6	+1	66.67
Malaysia Cup	21 November 2024	23 December 2024	Round of 16	Quarter-finals	4	2	1	1	3	1	+2	50.00
Total					31	14	10	7	48	35	+13	45.16

Source: Competitions

=== Malaysia Super League ===
12 May 2024 1	Kuala Lumpur City	1–1	Kuching City
		Report

19 May 2024 2	Kuching City	2–2	Sri Pahang
		Report

25 May 2024 3	Sabah	2–1	Kuching City
		Report

22 June 2024 4	Kuching City	1–1	Terengganu
		Report

12 July 2024 5	Kuching City	2–0	PDRM
		Report

26 July 2024 6	Kedah Darul Aman	1–1	Kuching City
		Report

30 July 2024 7	Perak	1–2	Kuching City
		Report

11 August 2024 8	Kuching City	2–2	Penang
		Report

26 August 2024 9	Kuching City	1–0	Kelantan Darul Naim
		Report

13 September 2024 10	Selangor	4–0	Kuching City
		Report

27 September 2024 11	Johor Darul Ta'zim	2–1	Kuching City
		Report

20 October 2024 12	Kuching City	1–1	Negeri Sembilan
		Report

26 October 2024 13	Kuching City	3–1	Kuala Lumpur City
		Report

4 March 2025 14	Sri Pahang	0–2	Kuching City
		Report

4 December 2024 15	Kuching City	1–2	Sabah
		Report

11 January 2025 16	PDRM	0–2	Kuching City
		Report

24 January 2025 17	Kuching City	3–0	Kedah Darul Aman
		Report

7 February 2025 18	Kuching City	1–1	Perak
		Report

16 February 2025 19	Penang	1–1	Kuching City
		Report

21 February 2025 20	Terengganu	2–2	Kuching City
		Report

26 February 2025 21	Kelantan Darul Naim	0–3	Kuching City
		Report

16 March 2025 22	Kuching City	2–1	Selangor
		Report

16 April 2025 23	Kuching City	0–2	Johor Darul Ta'zim
		Report

20 April 2025 24	Negeri Sembilan	1–3	Kuching City
		Report

Pos	Team	Pld	W	D	L	GF	GA	GD	Pts	Qualification or relegation
2	Selangor	24	16	4	4	44	16	+28	52	Qualification for the AFC Champions League Two group stage & ASEAN Club Championship (Note: Since the winners of the 2024 Malaysia FA Cup (Johor Darul Ta'zim) qualified for AFC competition based on their league positions, the berth is awarded to the 2nd-placed team in the league.)
3	Sabah	24	11	7	6	41	33	+8	40	
4	Kuching City	24	10	9	5	38	28	+10	39	
5	Terengganu	24	9	8	7	35	26	+9	35	
6	Kuala Lumpur City	24	11	4	9	40	33	+7	31 (Note: On 5 Aug 2024, Kuala Lumpur City were deducted six points for inaccurate or false declarations in their club licensing application.)	

Source: MFL
Rules for classification: 1) Points; 2) Goal difference; 3) Goals scored;

=== Malaysia FA Cup ===
Round of 16

14 June 2024	Kuala Lumpur City	2–3 (a.e.t.)	Kuching City
		Report

Quarter-finals

29 June 2024 First leg	Kuching City	2–1	Selangor
		Report

6 July 2024 Second leg	Selangor	3–2 (a.e.t.) (5–3 p)	Kuching City
		Report

=== Malaysia Cup ===
Round of 16

21 November 2024 First leg	Penang	0–1	Kuching City
		Report

30 November 2024 Second leg	Kuching City	2–0 (3–0 agg.)	Penang
		Report

Quarter-finals

15 December 2024 First leg	Kuching City	0–1	Sabah
		Report

23 December 2024 Second leg	Sabah	0–0 (1–0 agg.)	Kuching City
		Report

== Statistics ==
=== Appearances and goals ===
No.	Pos	Nat	Player	Total		Malaysia Super League		Malaysia FA Cup		Malaysia Cup	
No.	Pos	Nat	Player	Apps	Goals	Apps	Goals	Apps	Goals	Apps	Goals
Goalkeepers
38	GK	(Malaysia) MAS	Wan Azraie	17	0	12+1	0	0	0	4	0
55	GK	(Malaysia) MAS	Shahril Sa'ari	15	0	12	0	3	0	0	0
Defenders
2	DF	(Malaysia) MAS	Jimmy Raymond	29	1	22+1	1	2+1	0	3	0
3	DF	(Malaysia) MAS	Rodney Celvin	22	0	8+9	0	1	0	2+2	0
6	DF	(Malaysia) MAS	Arif Fadzilah	25	0	18	0	1+2	0	4	0
13	DF	(Malaysia) MAS	Dzulazlan Ibrahim	2	0	0+1	0	0+1	0	0	0
22	DF	(Malaysia) MAS	Hariz Mansor	1	0	0+1	0	0	0	0	0
27	DF	(Malaysia) MAS	Filemon Anyie	19	1	7+7	0	3	1	1+1	0
35	DF	(Nigeria) NGA	James Okwuosa	28	1	22	0	3	1	3	0
77	DF	(Japan) JPN	Yuki Tanigawa	30	2	23	2	3	0	4	0
Midfielders
9	MF	(Malaysia) MAS	Adam Shreen	1	0	0	0	0+1	0	0	0
10	MF	(Malaysia) MAS	Petrus Shitembi	23	4	16+3	4	0	0	4	0
12	MF	(Malaysia) MAS	Abang Azri	1	0	0+1	0	0	0	0	0
14	MF	(Malaysia) MAS	Amir Amri	9	0	3+5	0	1	0	0	0
17	MF	(Malaysia) MAS	Alauddin Farid	6	0	1+2	0	1+2	0	0	0
19	MF	(Malaysia) MAS	Arham Khussyairi	5	0	1+3	0	0+1	0	0	0
21	MF	(Malaysia) MAS	Danial Amier	18	1	13+1	1	0+1	0	3	0
25	MF	(Bahrain) BHR	Moses Atede	18	0	14	0	0	0	3+1	0
44	MF	(Malaysia) MAS	Alif Hassan	26	1	13+6	0	3	1	1+3	0
50	MF	(Malaysia) MAS	Diego Baggio	19	0	4+12	0	2+1	0	0	0
71	MF	(Malaysia) MAS	Rahim Razak	1	0	0	0	0	0	0+1	0
88	MF	(Malaysia) MAS	Zharmein Ashraf	2	0	0	0	1+1	0	0	0
91	MF	(Brazil) BRA	Nando Welter	14	1	2+8	1	2+1	0	0+1	0
Forwards
7	FW	(Ivory Coast) CIV	Kipré Tchétché	25	5	16+4	4	1	0	4	1
11	FW	(Malaysia) MAS	Shamie Iszuan	26	2	13+8	0	2+1	2	2	0
18	FW	(Malaysia) MAS	Zahrul Nizwan	25	5	1+17	4	0+3	1	0+4	0
28	FW	(Ghana) GHA	Jordan Mintah	28	14	16+5	13	3	1	1+3	0
29	FW	(Timor-Leste) TLS	Pedro Henrique	13	2	9+2	2	1	0	1	0
33	FW	(Malaysia) MAS	Hazwan Bakri	13	2	6+6	2	0	0	0+1	0
37	FW	(Malaysia) MAS	Ramadhan Saifullah	16	5	12	3	0	0	4	2
Players transferred out during the season

Last updated: 20 April 2025
Source: Competitions
