= 2020 Sarawak United FC season =

Sarawak United
2020 season
- Owner: Football Association of Sarawak
- Chairman: Posa Majais
- Head coach: E. Elavarasan
- Stadium: Sarawak Stadium
- Malaysia Premier League: 10th
- Top goalscorer: League: Patrick Wleh (5); All: Patrick Wleh (5)
Home colours	Away colours

The 2020 season was Sarawak United's 1st year in their history and also first season in the Malaysia Premier League following rebranding from Selangor United FC. Along with the league, the club also participated in the Malaysia FA Cup but was cancelled due to COVID-19 pandemic.

== Events ==
On 23 January 2020, Amri Yahyah signed with the club.

== Players ==
Note: Flags indicate national team as defined under FIFA eligibility rules; some limited exceptions apply. Players may hold more than one non-FIFA nationality.

No. / Pos. / Nation / Player; —	No. / Pos. / Nation / Player; —

== Competitions ==
=== Malaysia Premier League ===
==== League table ====
Pos	Team	Pld	W	D	L	GF	GA	GD	Pts	Qualification or relegation
8	Kelantan United	11	4	0	7	13	19	−6	12	
9	UKM	11	3	3	5	11	17	−6	12	Withrew from Premier League and dissolved.
10	Sarawak United	11	3	2	6	14	16	−2	11	
11	Negeri Sembilan	11	3	2	6	12	20	−8	11	
12	Perak II (Note: Johor Darul Ta'zim II, Perak II, Selangor II and Terengganu II cannot be promoted from Malaysia Premier League and play in Malaysia Cup as Johor Darul Ta'zim F.C., Perak FA, Selangor F.C. and Terengganu FC (their parent clubs) remain in Malaysia Super League and play in Malaysia Cup. Should the team be relegated to Malaysia Premier League or will not play in Malaysia Cup, Johor Darul Ta'zim II, Perak II, Selangor II and Terengganu II will have to drop to Malaysia M3 League or will play in Malaysia Cup.)	11	1	5	5	11	13	−2	8	

Updated to match(es) played on 31 October 2020. Source: MFL
Rules for classification: 1) Points; 2) Goal difference; 3) Number of goals scored.

== Statistics ==
=== Appearances and goals ===
As of 9 October 2020

No.	Pos	Nat	Player	Total		League	
No.	Pos	Nat	Player	Apps	Goals	Apps	Goals
1	GK	(Malaysia) MAS	Firdaus Muhamad	1	0	0+1	0
2	DF	(Malaysia) MAS	Abdul Qayyum	5	1	5	1
3	DF	(Malaysia) MAS	Farid Azmi	3	0	2+1	0
4	FW	(Liberia) LBR	Patrick Wleh	11	5	10+1	5
5	DF	(Malaysia) MAS	Rahman Ismawi	3	0	3	0
6	MF	(Malaysia) MAS	Muzaimir Hadi	5	0	5	0
7	MF	(Iran) IRI	Milad Zeneyedpour	11	3	9+2	3
9	FW	(Malaysia) MAS	Alan Lagang	1	0	0+1	0
10	FW	(Argentina) ARG	Gabriel Guerra	1	0	0+1	0
11	MF	(Malaysia) MAS	Ashri Chuchu	10	0	7+3	0
13	DF	(Malaysia) MAS	Badrul Affendy	5	0	5	0
14	FW	(Malaysia) MAS	Yusaini Hafiz	1	0	0+1	0
17	MF	(Malaysia) MAS	Amri Yahyah	11	2	11	2
18	DF	(Malaysia) MAS	Syukri Azman	6	0	3+3	0
19	FW	(Malaysia) MAS	Fauzi Roslan	8	0	1+7	0
20	GK	(Malaysia) MAS	Shaiful Wazizi	10	0	10	0
22	FW	(Malaysia) MAS	Zahrul Nizwan	3	0	0+3	0
23	MF	(Malaysia) MAS	Chanturu Suppiah	11	0	7+4	0
24	DF	(Malaysia) MAS	Ali Imran Alimi	2	0	0+2	0
25	DF	(Malaysia) MAS	Farid Ramli	9	0	8+1	0
30	DF	(Argentina) ARG	Nicolás Marotta	1	0	1	0
31	GK	(Malaysia) MAS	Farhan Abu Bakar	1	0	1	0
32	MF	(Malaysia) MAS	Veenod Subramaniam	11	0	11	0
33	DF	(Brazil) BRA	Demerson	10	1	10	1
44	DF	(Malaysia) MAS	Alif Hassan	8	1	7+1	1
77	MF	(Malaysia) MAS	Rahim Razak	2	0	2	0
99	MF	(Malaysia) MAS	Adam Shreen	5	1	3+2	1
