= Partiban Janasekaran =

Malaysian association football player

Personal information
- Full name: Partiban a/l K. Janasekaran
- Date of birth: 28 November 1992 (age 33)
- Place of birth: Ipoh, Perak, Malaysia
- Height: 1.79 m (5 ft 10 in)
- Position: Winger

Team information
- Current team: Kuala Lumpur City
- Number: 16

Youth career
- 2012–2013: Perak

Senior career*
Years	Team	Apps	(Gls)
2014	Perak	0	(2)
2015–2016	Sarawak United	15	(2)
2017–2018	Terengganu	37	(3)
2019–2021	Perak	36	(6)
2021–	Kuala Lumpur City	45	(3)
2023	→ Kedah Darul Aman (loan)	8	(1)

International career^{‡}
2019	Malaysia	2	(0)
- * Club domestic league appearances and goals as of 12 June 2025 ‡ National team caps and goals as of 10 September 2019

Partiban a/l K. Janasekaran (born 28 November 1992) is a Malaysian professional footballer who plays as a midfielder for Malaysia Super League side Kuala Lumpur City.

== Club career ==
=== Perak ===
On 8 November 2018, Partiban completed his transfer to Perak.

== Career statistics ==
=== Club ===
As of match played 12 September 2024

Club	Season	League			Malaysia FA Cup		Malaysia Cup		Continental		Total	
Club	Season	Division	Apps	Goals	Apps	Goals	Apps	Goals	Apps	Goals	Apps	Goals
Sarawak	2015	Malaysia Super League	0	1	0	0	0	0	0	0	0	0
Sarawak	2016	Malaysia Super League	15	1	0	1	0	0	0	0	0	2
Terengganu	2017	Malaysia Premier League	17	2	4	0	4	0	0	0	25	2
Terengganu	2018	Malaysia Super League	20	1	1	0	10	0	0	0	31	1
Perak	2019	Malaysia Super League	19	3	6	2	1	0	2	0	28	5
Perak	2020	Malaysia Super League	7	2	0	0	0	0	0	0	7	2
Perak	2021	Malaysia Super League	10	1	0	0	0	0	0	0	10	1
Kuala Lumpur City	2021	Malaysia Super League	9	0	–		10	2	–		19	2
Kuala Lumpur City	2022	Malaysia Super League	15	2	1	1	4	0	4	0	24	3
Kuala Lumpur City	2023	Malaysia Super League	5	1	1	0	0	0	0	0	6	1
Kuala Lumpur City	2024–25	Malaysia Super League	16	0	1	0	4	0	3 (Note: Appearances in ASEAN Club Championship)	0	24	0
Kedah Darul Aman (loan)	2023	Malaysia Super League	8	1	–		2	0	–		10	1
Career total			141	15	14	4	35	2	9	0	186	21

=== International ===
As of match played 10 September 2019

Malaysia
Year	Apps	Goals
2019	2	0
Total	2	0

== Honours ==
=== Club ===
KL City FC

- Malaysia Cup: 2021
- AFC Cup runner-up: 2022
- Malaysia FA Cup runner-up: 2023

Terengganu

- Malaysia Premier League runner-up: 2017
- Malaysia Cup runner-up: 2018

Perak

- Malaysia FA Cup runner-up: 2019
