= Lee Jong-ho =

Lee Jong-ho may refer to:

- Lee Jong-ho (engineer), South Korean electronic engineer
- Lee Jong-ho (footballer, born 1986)
- Lee Jong-ho (footballer, born 1992)
