= 2017 Malaysia Super League =

Liga Super Malaysia
- Season: 2017
- Dates: 20 January 2017 – 28 October 2017
- Champions: Johor Darul Ta'zim; 4th Super League title 4th Liga M title
- Relegated: Sarawak; Penang; Felda United; T-Team
- AFC Champions League: Johor Darul Ta'zim
- AFC Cup: Johor Darul Ta'zim
- Matches: 132
- Goals: 408 (3.09 per match)
- Top goalscorer: Mohammed Ghaddar (23 goals)
- Biggest home win: Johor Darul Ta'zim 7–0 Melaka United (9 April 2017)
- Biggest away win: T-Team 1–6 Johor Darul Ta'zim (22 July 2017)
- Highest scoring: PKNS 5–3 Selangor (4 February 2017); PKNS 4–4 Kedah (9 May 2017)
- Longest winning run: (7 games); Johor Darul Ta'zim
- Longest unbeaten run: (14 games); Johor Darul Ta'zim
- Highest attendance: 25,000; Kedah 3–2 Sarawak (27 January 2017); Kedah 3–1 Penang (25 February 2017); Kedah 4–0 Melaka United (4 March 2017)
- Lowest attendance: 0 Perak 3–2 Melaka United (4 February 2017)
- Total attendance: 881,178
- Average attendance: 6,676
- All statistics correct as of 31 October 2017; Source: SPMB, Liga Malaysia, FMLPP.

The 2017 Malaysia Super League (Malay: Liga Super Malaysia 2017) was the 14th season of the Malaysia Super League, the top-tier professional football league in Malaysia.

The season began on 20 January and concluded on 28 October 2017.

The defending champions were Johor Darul Ta'zim and retained the title from the previous season.

== Team changes ==
The following teams have changed division.

=== To Malaysia Super League ===
Promoted from Premier League

- Melaka United
- PKNS

=== From Malaysia Super League ===
Relegated to Premier League

- PDRM
- Terengganu

== Teams ==
PDRM and Terengganu were relegated to 2017 Malaysia Premier League after finished 11th and bottom place of 2016 Malaysia Super League. Melaka United and PKNS promoted to 2017 Malaysia Super League after securing place as champions and runners-up in 2016 Malaysia Premier League.

Team	Location	Stadium	Capacity
Felda United	Bandar Pusat Jengka, Pahang	Tun Abdul Razak Stadium	25,000
Johor Darul Ta'zim	Johor Bahru, Johor	Tan Sri Dato Haji Hassan Yunos Stadium	30,000
Kedah	Alor Setar, Kedah	Darul Aman Stadium	32,387
Kelantan	Kota Bharu, Kelantan	Sultan Mohammad IV Stadium	25,000
Melaka United	Krubong, Malacca	Hang Jebat Stadium	40,000
Pahang	Kuantan, Pahang	Darul Makmur Stadium	40,000
Penang	Batu Kawan, Penang	State of Penang Stadium	40,000
Perak	Ipoh, Perak	Perak Stadium	42,500
PKNS	Shah Alam, Selangor	Shah Alam Stadium	80,372
Sarawak	Kuching, Sarawak	Sarawak State Stadium	26,000
Selangor	Selayang, Selangor	Selayang Stadium	11,098
T–Team	Kuala Terengganu, Terengganu	Sultan Ismail Nasiruddin Shah Stadium	15,000

Note: Table lists in alphabetical order.

=== Locations and stadium ===
Locations of teams in the 2017 Liga Super
- Primary venues used in the Liga Super:

Felda United	Johor Darul Ta'zim	Kedah
Tun Abdul Razak Stadium	Tan Sri Dato Haji Hassan Yunos Stadium	Darul Aman Stadium
Capacity: **25,000**	Capacity: **30,000**	Capacity: **32,387**
Kelantan	Melaka United	Pahang
Sultan Muhammad IV Stadium	Hang Jebat Stadium	Darul Makmur Stadium
Capacity: **25,000**	Capacity: **40,000**	Capacity: **40,000**
Penang	Perak	Sarawak
Penang State Stadium	Perak Stadium	Sarawak State Stadium
Capacity: **40,000**	Capacity: **42,500**	Capacity: **26,000**
PKNS	T–Team	Selangor
Shah Alam Stadium	Sultan Ismail Nasiruddin Shah Stadium	Selayang Stadium
Capacity: **80,372**	Capacity: **15,000**	Capacity: **11,098**

- ^{1} Correct as of end of 2016 Liga Super season

=== Personnel and sponsoring ===
Note: Flags indicate national team as has been defined under FIFA eligibility rules. Players may hold more than one non-FIFA nationality.

Team	Head coach	Captain	Kit manufacturer	Main sponsor
Felda United	(Malaysia) B. Sathianathan	(Malaysia) Shukor Adan	FBT	FELDA
Johor Darul Ta'zim	(Portugal) Ulisses Morais	(Malaysia) Safiq Rahim	Nike	Forest City
Kedah	(Malaysia) Nidzam Adzha	(Malaysia) Khairul Helmi Johari	Al-Ikhsan	Bina Darulaman Berhad
Kelantan	(Malaysia) Zahasmi Ismail	(Malaysia) Badhri Radzi	HORC	redONE, Al Hamra Group, ChengalJati
Melaka United	(Portugal) Eduardo Almeida	(Malaysia) Surendran Ravindran	Kronos	Edra, CGN, Tag Marine
Pahang	(Malaysia) Dollah Salleh	(Malaysia) Matthew Davies	FILA	Aras Kuasa
Penang	(Malaysia) Zainal Abidin Hassan	(Malaysia) Rafiuddin Rodin	Legea	myPenang
Perak	(Australia) Mehmet Durakovic	(Malaysia) Shahrom Kalam	Al-Ikhsan	Lembaga Air Perak & Perak Corp.
PKNS	(Germany) Sven Gartung	(Malaysia) Safee Sali	Kappa	PKNS
Sarawak	(Malaysia) Pengiran Bala (caretaker)	(Malaysia) Ronny Harun	Starsport	Sarawak Energy
Selangor	(Malaysia) P. Maniam	(Malaysia) Razman Roslan	Lotto	Selangor
T–Team	(Indonesia) Rahmad Darmawan	(Malaysia) Hasbullah Awang	Kobert	Chicken Cottage

=== Coaching changes ===
Note: Flags indicate national team as has been defined under FIFA eligibility rules. Players may hold more than one non-FIFA nationality.

Team	Outgoing coach	Manner of departure	Date of vacancy	Position in table	Incoming coach	Date of appointment
Felda United	(Malaysia) Mohd Bin Nik	End of caretaker spell	22 October 2016	Pre-season	(Malaysia) Azmi Mohamed	1 November 2016
Melaka United	(Malaysia) Mat Zan Mat Aris	End of contract	22 October 2016	Pre-season	(Australia) Eric Williams	17 November 2016
Pahang	(Malaysia) Razip Ismail	End of contract	22 October 2016	Pre-season	(Malaysia) Dollah Salleh	1 December 2016
Kelantan	(Bulgaria) Velizar Popov	Resigned	22 October 2016	Pre-season	(Malaysia) Zahasmi Ismail	30 November 2016
Penang	(Croatia) Nenad Baćina	End of contract	24 November 2016	Pre-season	(England) Ashley Westwood	28 November 2016
Selangor	(Malaysia) K. Gunalan	End of caretaker spell	26 December 2016	Pre-season	(Malaysia) P. Maniam	26 December 2016
Johor Darul Ta'zim	(Argentina) Mario Gómez	Mutual consent	18 January 2017	Pre-season	(Mexico) Benjamin Mora	18 January 2017
Felda United	(Malaysia) Azmi Mohamed	Resigned	7 February 2017	11th	(Malaysia) B. Sathianathan	21 February 2017
Perak	(Germany) Karl Heinz Weigang	Sacked	22 February 2017	3rd	(Australia) Mehmet Durakovic	22 February 2017
Penang	(England) Ashley Westwood	Mutual Agreement	19 March 2017	12th	(Malaysia) Zainal Abidin Hassan	23 March 2017
Kedah	(Malaysia) Tan Cheng Hoe	Appointed as Malaysia assistant coach	29 April 2017	3rd	(Malaysia) Nidzam Adzha	23 May 2017
Melaka United	(Australia) Eric Williams	Rested	23 May 2017	10th	(Portugal) Eduardo Almeida	17 June 2017
Johor Darul Ta'zim	(Mexico) Benjamin Mora	Demoted to JDT II	19 June 2017	1st	(Portugal) Ulisses Morais	19 June 2017
PKNS	(Malaysia) E. Elavarasan	Rested	7 July 2017	10th	(Germany) Sven Gartung	17 July 2017
Sarawak	(Malaysia) David Usop	Rested	13 July 2017	10th	(Malaysia) Pengiran Bala (caretaker)	13 July 2017

=== Foreign players ===
The number of foreign players is restricted to four per Malaysian League team. A team can use four foreign players on the field in each game, including at least one player from the AFC country.

Note: Flags indicate national team as defined under FIFA eligibility rules. Players may hold more than one FIFA and non-FIFA nationality.

Team	Player 1	Player 2	Player 3	Player 4 (Asian)	Former Players ^{1}
Felda United	(Liberia) Zah Rahan Krangar	(Nigeria) **Ifedayo Olusegun**	(Brazil) **Thiago Augusto**	(Australia) **Dino Djulbic**	(Argentina) Gastón Cellerino (Lebanon) Mootaz El Jounaidi (Argentina) Lucas Cano
Johor Darul Ta'zim	(Brazil) Marcos António	(Argentina) Gonzalo Cabrera	(Argentina) **Gabriel Guerra**	(Lebanon) **Mohammed Ghaddar**	(Argentina) Jerónimo Barrales ^{2} (Iraq) Brian Ferreira
Kedah	(Kosovo) Liridon Krasniqi	(Brazil) Sandro	(Denmark) Ken Ilsø	(Australia) Zac Anderson	
Kelantan	(The Gambia) Mamadou Danso	(Senegal) Morgaro Gomis	(Brazil) Alessandro Celin	(Lebanon) **Abou Bakr Al-Mel**	(Lebanon) Mohammed Ghaddar
Melaka United	(North Macedonia) **Jasmin Mecinović**	(Brazil) **Felipe**	(Croatia) **Marko Šimić**	(South Korea) Jeon Woo-young	(Ghana) Godwin Antwi (Argentina) Ezequiel Agüero (Montenegro) Ilija Spasojević
Pahang	(Argentina) **Yamil Romero**	(The Gambia) Mohamadou Sumareh	(Brazil) Matheus Alves	(South Korea) Heo Jae-won	(Nigeria) Bright Dike
Penang	(Guam) **Brandon McDonald**	(The Gambia) **Sanna Nyassi**	(Papua New Guinea) Nigel Dabinyaba	(Philippines) **Mark Hartmann**	(Australia) Diogo Ferreira (Hong Kong) Andy Russell (Brazil) Reinaldo Lobo
Perak	(Brazil) Thiago Junio	(Brazil) **Leandro**	(Brazil) **Gilmar**	(Palestine) Yashir Pinto	(Kosovo) Faton Toski (Bulgaria) Vladislav Mirchev
PKNS	(The Gambia) **Abdou Jammeh**	(Portugal) **Fabio Ferreira**	(Liberia) Patrick Wleh	(South Korea) **Park Kwang-il**	(Argentina) Lucas Espindola (Palestine) Matias Jadue (Argentina) Gonzalo Soto
Sarawak	(Brazil) Demerson	**(Montenegro) Miloš Raičković**	(Croatia) Mateo Roskam	(Singapore) **Sahil Suhaimi**	(Philippines) Mark Hartmann (South Korea) Lee Jong-ho
Selangor	(Nigeria) Ugo Ukah	(Spain) **Rufino Segovia**	(Liberia) Francis Doe	(Indonesia) **Andik Vermansyah**	(Romania) Victoraș Astafei (Brazil) Juliano Mineiro
T–Team	(Mali) Abdoulaye Maïga	(Mali) Mamadou Samassa	(Cameroon) **Yannick N'Djeng**	(Uzbekistan) Dilshod Sharofetdinov	(Uzbekistan) Farhod Tadjiyev

- Players name in **bold** indicates the player is registered during the mid-season transfer window.
- **^1** Foreign players who left their clubs or were de-registered from playing squad due to medical issues or other matters.
- **^2** Johor Darul Ta'zim swap the strikers with Johor Darul Ta'zim II

=== Naturalised players ===
Note: Flags indicate national team as defined under FIFA eligibility rules. Players may hold more than one FIFA and non-FIFA nationality.

Team	Player 1	Player 2	Player 3
Felda United	(Australia) (Malaysia) Curran Singh Ferns^{3}	(Scotland) (Malaysia) Stuart Wark^{3}	
Johor Darul Ta'zim	(Sweden) (Malaysia) Junior Eldstål^{3} ^{4}	(England) (Malaysia) Darren Lok^{3} ^{4}	(Spain) (Malaysia) Natxo Insa^{3}
Melaka United	(New Zealand) (Malaysia) Khair Jones^{3} ^{4}	(England) (Malaysia) Nicholas Swirad^{3}	
Pahang	(Spain) (Malaysia) Kiko Insa^{3}	(Australia) (Malaysia) Matthew Davies^{3} ^{4}	
Penang	(Australia) (Malaysia) Shazalee Ramlee^{3}		

Notes:

^3 Carrying Malaysian heritage.
^4 Participated in the Malaysia national team squad.

== Results ==
=== League table ===
Pos	Team	Pld	W	D	L	GF	GA	GD	Pts	Qualification or relegation
1	Johor Darul Ta'zim (C)	22	15	4	3	50	19	+31	49	Qualification to Champions League preliminary round 2 or AFC Cup group stage
2	Pahang (Note: Pahang withdraw from AFC competition.)	22	12	4	6	44	26	+18	40	
3	Felda United (Note: Felda United were relegated because they failed to renew their licence) (R)	22	11	6	5	40	26	+14	39	Relegation to Premier League
4	Kedah (Note: Kedah as 2017 Malaysia FA Cup winners not eligible for AFC competition spots as they failed granted AFC club license.)	22	9	8	5	45	33	+12	35	
5	Perak	22	9	7	6	30	31	−1	34	
6	Selangor	22	9	6	7	32	28	+4	33	
7	PKNS	22	6	7	9	33	38	−5	25	
8	Melaka United	22	6	6	10	33	46	−13	24	
9	T–Team (R)	22	7	5	10	30	45	−15	23 (Note: Kelantan and T–Team was sentenced to a six-point deduction immediately on offense failed to complete the registration process Malaysian League (M-League) 2017. Later, upon careful consideration of the aforementioned appeals, Football Malaysia have decided to lift the transfer ban and reduce the deduction of 6 points to 3 points for T-Team.)	Relegation to Premier League
10	Kelantan	22	7	4	11	31	39	−8	22 (Note: Kelantan and T–Team was sentenced to a six-point deduction immediately on offense failed to complete the registration process Malaysian League (M-League) 2017. Later, upon careful consideration of the aforementioned appeals, Football Malaysia have decided to only reduce the deduction of 6 points to 3 points for Kelantan.)	
11	Sarawak (R)	22	5	6	11	24	34	−10	21	Relegation to Premier League
12	Penang (R)	22	3	3	16	16	43	−27	12	Relegation to Premier League

Source: FAM, FMLLP
Rules for classification: 1) Points; 2) Goal difference; 3) Number of goals scored.
(C) Champions; (R) Relegated

=== Result table ===
Home \ Away	FEL	JDT	KED	KEL	MEL	PAH	PEN	PRK	PKN	SWK	SEL	TTE
Felda United		3–2	1–1	1–2	3–0	2–1	0–1	2–2	1–0	2–0	3–1	5–1
Johor Darul Ta'zim	3–1		1–1	3–0	7–0	3–2	2–0	2–1	2–1	3–1	0–0	3–0
Kedah	1–3	0–0		5–0	4–0	4–1	3–1	2–3	1–1	3–2	1–1	3–0
Kelantan	1–1	2–3	0–1		0–2	1–2	2–2	0–2	0–0	0–2	0–2	4–2
Melaka United	1–1	1–1	2–4	1–3		1–3	2–3	3–1	2–2	4–2	2–1	1–2
Pahang	1–1	0–2	2–1	2–3	2–0		6–1	1–1	3–0	3–0	2–2	5–0
Penang	1–2	1–2	0–2	1–5	1–1	0–2		0–1	0–2	0–1	1–3	0–2
Perak	1–0	2–1	1–1	2–4	3–2	1–1	1–0		2–0	0–0	0–1	2–2
PKNS	2–4	0–1	4–4	1–3	1–1	1–3	1–1	3–0		2–3	5–3	2–1
Sarawak	1–3	0–2	4–2	0–0	0–1	0–1	2–0	3–3	0–1		1–1	0–0
Selangor	3–1	2–1	1–1	1–0	1–1	0–2	2–0	0–1	1–2	2–1		4–2
T–Team	0–0	1–6	5–0	1–3	1–5	0–1	1–0	3–0	2–1	1–1	1–0	

Updated to match(es) played on 28 October 2017. Source: FAM, FMLLP
Legend: Blue = home team win; Yellow = draw; Red = away team win.

=== Positions by round ===
Leader
Relegation to 2018 Liga Premier

Team \ Round	1	2	3	4	5	6	7	8	9	10	11	12	13	14	15	16	17	18	19	20	21	22
Johor Darul Ta'zim	3	2	4	7	8	5	4	3	1	1	1	1	1	1	1	1	1	1	1	1	1	1
Pahang	5	1	1	2	2	2	1	2	2	2	2	2	2	2	3	3	3	3	3	2	2	2
Felda United	2	7	7	10	11	11	11	7	9	8	8	6	6	6	5	4	6	4	4	4	3	3
Kedah	4	4	3	1	1	1	2	1	3	3	3	3	3	3	2	2	2	2	2	3	4	4
Perak	6	5	2	3	3	4	5	4	5	5	4	5	4	4	6	6	5	6	6	6	5	5
Selangor	1	3	6	8	4	3	3	5	4	4	6	4	5	5	4	5	4	5	5	5	6	6
PKNS	11	11	8	6	6	7	9	9	8	9	9	9	9	10	9	9	8	7	7	7	7	7
Melaka United	10	8	10	11	9	8	8	10	10	10	10	10	11	11	11	11	11	10	10	9	8	8
T–Team	8	10	9	4	5	6	7	8	7	7	7	8	7	8	7	7	7	8	8	8	9	9
Kelantan	9	6	5	5	7	10	6	6	6	6	5	7	8	7	8	8	9	9	9	10	11	10
Sarawak	7	9	11	9	10	9	10	11	11	11	11	11	10	9	10	10	10	11	11	11	10	11
Penang	12	12	12	12	12	12	12	12	12	12	12	12	12	12	12	12	12	12	12	12	12	12

== Statistics ==
=== Top scorers ===
As of 28 October 2017.

Rank	Player	Club	Goals
1	(Lebanon) Mohammed Ghaddar	Johor Darul Ta'zim (5), Kelantan (18)	23
2	(Brazil) Matheus Alves	Pahang	18
3	(Denmark) Ken Ilsø	Kedah	15
4	(Brazil) Thiago Augusto	Felda United	14
5	(Argentina) Gonzalo Cabrera	Johor Darul Ta'zim	11
6	(Malaysia) Safiq Rahim	Johor Darul Ta'zim	9
6	(Malaysia) Baddrol Bakhtiar	Kedah	9
6	(Croatia) Marko Šimić	Melaka United	9
6	(Croatia) Mateo Roskam	Sarawak	9
10	(Brazil) Sandro	Kedah	8
10	(Liberia) Patrick Wleh	PKNS	8
10	(Liberia) Francis Doe	Selangor	8
13	(Argentina) Gabriel Guerra	Johor Darul Ta'zim	7
14	(The Gambia) Mohamadou Sumareh	Pahang	6
14	(Argentina) Lucas Cano	Felda United	6
16	(Nigeria) Ifedayo Olusegun	Felda United	5
16	(South Korea) Jeon Woo-young	Melaka United	5
16	(Palestine) Yashir Pinto	Perak	5
16	(Argentina) Lucas Espindola	PKNS	5
16	(Philippines) Mark Hartmann	Penang (2), Sarawak (3)	5
16	(Brazil) Juliano Mineiro	Selangor	5
16	(Spain) Rufino Segovia	Selangor	5
16	(Uzbekistan) Farhod Tadjiyev	T–Team	5
16	(Malaysia) Nor Hakim Hassan	T–Team	5

=== Top assists ===
As of 28 October 2017

Rank	Player	Club	Assists
1	(Malaysia) Safiq Rahim	Johor Darul Ta'zim	13
2	(Kosovo) Liridon Krasniqi	Kedah	9
3	(Brazil) Matheus Alves	Pahang	8
3	(The Gambia) Mohamadou Sumareh	Pahang	8
4	(Argentina) Gabriel Guerra	Johor Darul Ta'zim	6
4	(Brazil) Sandro	Kedah	6
4	(Brazil) Felipe Souza	Melaka United	6

=== Hat-tricks ===
As of 28 October 2017.

Player	For	Against	Result	Date
(Liberia) Patrick Wleh	PKNS	Selangor	5–3 (H)	4 February 2017
(Argentina) Gabriel Guerra	Johor Darul Ta'zim	T–Team	3–0 (H)	25 February 2017
(Lebanon) Mohammed Ghaddar	Kelantan	Perak	2–4 (A)	1 March 2017
(Lebanon) Mohammed Ghaddar	Kelantan	T–Team	4–2 (H)	4 March 2017
(Lebanon) Mohammed Ghaddar	Kelantan	Penang	1–5^{4} (A)	15 April 2017
(Malaysia) Safiq Rahim	Johor Darul Ta'zim	Melaka United	7–0 (H)	9 April 2017
(Malaysia) Nor Hakim Hassan	T–Team	Kedah	5–0 (H)	15 April 2017
(Denmark) Ken Ilsø	Kedah	T–Team	3–0 (H)	24 May 2017
(Brazil) Thiago Augusto	Felda United	Sarawak	1–3 (A)	11 July 2017
(Brazil) Thiago Augusto	Felda United	T–Team	5–1 (H)	15 July 2017

Notes:
^{4} Player scored 4 goals; (H) – Home; (A) – Away

=== Own goals ===
As of 28 October 2017.

Rank	Player	For	Against	Date	Goals
1	(Malaysia) Syazwan Tajuddin	Kedah	Perak	1 July 2017	1
1	(Palestine) Matias Jadue	PKNS	Johor Darul Ta'zim	15 April 2017	1

=== Clean sheets ===
As of 28 October 2017.

Rank	Player	Club	Clean sheets	Avg.
1	(Malaysia) Hafizul Hakim	Perak	7	1.410
2	(Malaysia) Shahril Saa'ri	Sarawak	6	1.370
3	(Malaysia) Wan Azraie	Pahang	5	1.290
3	(Malaysia) Izham Tarmizi	Johor Darul Ta'zim	5	0.690
5	(Malaysia) Ifwat Akmal	Kedah	4	1.270
5	(Malaysia) Farizal Harun	Felda United	4	1.180
7	(Malaysia) Hafidz Romly	T–Team	3	2.30
7	(Malaysia) Suhaimi Husin	T–Team	3	1.750
7	(Malaysia) Khairulazhan Khalid	Selangor	3	1.210
7	(Malaysia) Tauffiq Ar Rasyid Johar	PKNS	3	1.0
7	(Malaysia) Farizal Marlias	Johor Darul Ta'zim	3	0.880
12	(Malaysia) Helmi Eliza	Pahang	2	0.830
12	(Malaysia) Fazli Paat	Melaka United	2	2.270
12	(Malaysia) Farhan Abu Bakar	Kedah	2	1.710
12	(Malaysia) Hadi Hamid	Kedah	2	0.750
16	(Malaysia) Izzuddin Hussin	T–Team	1	1.80
16	(Malaysia) Norazlan Razali	Selangor	1	1.570
16	(Malaysia) Zarif Irfan	Selangor	1	0
16	(Malaysia) Zamir Selamat	PKNS	1	2.090
16	(Malaysia) Sani Anuar	Penang	1	2.220
16	(Malaysia) Amirul Asyraf	Penang	1	1.630
16	(Malaysia) Ramadhan Hamid	Kelantan	1	1.60
16	(Malaysia) Khairul Fahmi	Kelantan	1	1.640
16	(Malaysia) Haziq Nadzli	Johor Darul Ta'zim	1	1.50

=== Discipline ===
As of 27 September 2017.

==== Player ====
#	Player	Club	Total		
#	Player	Club	Yellow card	(yellow card) (red card)	Red card
1	(Nigeria) Ugo Ukah	Selangor	6	1	0
2	(Malaysia) Mohd Raimi	Selangor	4	1	0
3	(Malaysia) Rizal Ghazali	Kedah	3	0	1
3	(Malaysia) Azrul Ahmad	Kedah	3	0	1
5	(Malaysia) Akram Mahinan	Kedah	6	0	0
6	(Malaysia) Baddrol Bakhtiar	Kedah	2	0	1
6	(Denmark) Ken Ilsø	Kedah	2	0	1
6	(Malaysia) Mohd Qayyum	Kelantan	2	0	1
6	(North Macedonia) Jasmin Mecinović	Melaka United	2	0	1
6	(Malaysia) Hairol Mokhtar	Melaka United	2	0	1
6	(Malaysia) S. Kunanlan	Johor Darul Ta'zim	2	1	0
12	(Senegal) Morgaro Gomis	Kelantan	5	0	0
12	(Malaysia) Fauzan Dzulkifli	PKNS	5	0	0
12	(Malaysia) Shahrom Kalam	Perak	5	0	0
12	(Malaysia) Fitri Omar	Kedah	5	0	0
12	(Palestine) Yashir Pinto	Perak	5	0	0
12	(Malaysia) Hafiz Kamal	Perak	5	0	0
12	(Malaysia) Kiko Insa	Pahang	5	0	0
12	(Kosovo) Liridon Krasniqi	Kedah	5	0	0

==== Club ====
#	Club	Total		
#	Club	Yellow card	(yellow card) (red card)	Red card
1	Selangor	41	2	2
2	Kedah	41	0	3
3	Perak	41	0	0
4	PKNS	34	0	0
5	Felda United	32	1	0
6	Sarawak	29	0	1
7	Johor Darul Ta'zim	28	2	0
8	Pahang	27	0	0
9	Kelantan	26	0	1
10	Penang	24	0	2
11	Melaka United	17	0	1
12	T–Team	16	0	0
Total		356	5	10

== Attendances ==
=== Overall attendance ===
Home	Away												Attendance	
Home	FEL	JDT	KED	KEL	MEL	PAH	PEN	PRK	PKN	SWK	SEL	TTE	TOTAL	AVE
Felda United	-----	1,724	6,211	10,393	1,367	18,500	1,300	2,992	2,277	1,552	2,469	1,288	50,073	4,552
Johor Darul Ta'zim	18,320	-----	24,157	18,210	14,475	20,480	16,850	16,985	13,325	10,126	19,822	14,807	187,557	17,051
Kedah	4,000	3,000	-----	11,970	25,000	12,000	25,000	7,656	20,000	25,000	18,000	10,000	161,626	14,693
Kelantan	1,061	13,891	20,853	-----	8,963	3,373	8,924	1,523	5,076	1,251	2,503	10,653	78,071	7,097
Melaka United	2,711	11,037	7,048	4,723	-----	12,151	4,004	1,683	2,399	2,237	2,059	7,322	57,374	5,216
Pahang	5,646	8,053	6,111	11,267	2,455	-----	9,654	1,759	10,826	944	12,847	13,402	82,964	7,542
Penang	1,393	3,091	18,545	8,130	1,288	2,158	-----	9,000	2,173	4,946	728	603	52,055	4,732
Perak	2,678	22,382	3,753	5,570	0	19,720	1,412	-----	5,310	1,350	7,090	1,961	71,226	6,475
PKNS	75	3,754	4,290	6,080	2,616	1,092	281	4,882	-----	1,007	6,113	44	30,234	2,748
Sarawak	1,497	6,153	1,162	1,596	7,703	8,011	1,214	2,465	1,211	-----	2,185	2,185	35,106	3,201
Selangor	1,819	11,257	8,315	7,837	5,777	9,756	3,076	9,000	847	2,928	-----	2,285	62,897	5,718
T–Team	1,079	1,084	1,144	1,262	700	300	821	888	1,231	1,763	1,723	-----	11,995	1,090
Total League Attendance													881,178	6,676

Last updated: 28 October 2017.
Source: SPMB

=== Highest and lowest ===
Pos	Team	Total	High	Low	Average	Change
1	Johor Darul Ta'zim	187,557	24,157	10,126	17,051	−2.3%
2	Kedah	161,626	25,000	3,000	14,693	+56.3%
3	Pahang	82,964	13,402	944	7,542	+91.9%
4	Kelantan	78,071	20,853	1,061	7,097	−12.7%
5	Perak	71,226	19,720	0	6,475	−41.5%
6	Selangor	62,897	11,257	847	5,718	+14.5%
7	Melaka United	57,374	12,151	1,683	5,216	−54.7%^{1}
8	Penang	52,055	18,545	603	4,732	−35.2%
9	Felda United	50,073	18,500	1,288	4,552	−39.4%
10	Sarawak	35,106	8,011	1,162	3,201	+53.8%
11	PKNS	30,234	6,113	44	2,748	+49.6%^{1}
12	T–Team	11,995	1,763	300	1,090	−15.6%
	League total	881,178	25,000	0	6,676	−7.4%

Updated to games played on 28 October 2017
Source: SPMB
Notes:
1: Team played last season in Liga Premier.

== See also ==
- 2017 Malaysia Premier League
- 2017 Malaysia FAM League
- 2017 Malaysia FA Cup
- 2017 Malaysia Cup
- 2017 Piala Presiden
- 2017 Piala Belia
- List of Malaysian football transfers 2017
- List of Malaysian football transfers May–June 2017
