= 2022 Sarawak United FC season =

Sarawak United
2022 season
- Owner: Football Association of Sarawak
- Chairman: Posa Majais
- Head coach: S. Balachandran
- Stadium: Sarawak Stadium
- Malaysia Super League: 11th (relegated)
- Malaysia FA Cup: Second round
- Malaysia Cup: Round of 16
- Top goalscorer: League: Boris Kok (4); All: Boris Kok (4)
| Home colours | Away colours |

The 2022 season was Sarawak United's third year in their history and first season in the Malaysia Super League since last year following rebranding from Selangor United FC. Along with the league, the club will also compete in the Malaysia Cup.

== Players ==
Note: Flags indicate national team as defined under FIFA eligibility rules; some limited exceptions apply. Players may hold more than one non-FIFA nationality.

| No. | Pos. | Nation | Player |
|---|---|---|---|
| 1 | GK | MAS | Tauffiq Ar Rasyid Johar |
| 2 | DF | MAS | Amirul Ashraf |
| 4 | DF | MAS | Raja Imran Shah |
| 5 | DF | MAS | Rahman Ismawi |
| 6 | MF | MAS | Norman Angkun |
| 7 | FW | MAS | Shamie Iszuan |
| 8 | MF | MAS | Khairil Anuar |
| 9 | FW | CIV | Francis Koné |
| 11 | MF | MAS | Ashri Chuchu |
| 12 | DF | MAS | Azman Chuchu |
| 14 | DF | MAS | Kalaiharasan Letchumanan |
| 15 | MF | KOR | Lee Chang-hoon |
| 16 | DF | MAS | Stuart Wark |
| 17 | DF | MAS | Azizi Ramlee |
| 18 | FW | MAS | Alphonsus Joseph Willie |
| 19 | FW | MAS | Christie Jayaseelan |
| 20 | MF | MAS | Abang Azri Fikri |

| No. | Pos. | Nation | Player |
|---|---|---|---|
| 21 | FW | NGA | Uche Agba (captain) |
| 22 | FW | MAS | Zahrul Nizwan |
| 23 | MF | MAS | Veenod Subramaniam |
| 25 | GK | MAS | Aquila Abdul Rhaman |
| 26 | MF | MAS | Amer Saidin |
| 27 | MF | MAS | Chanthuru Suppiah |
| 28 | DF | ARG | Gonzalo Soto |
| 29 | DF | CAM | Boris Kok |
| 33 | DF | MAS | Abbel Akwensivie |
| 36 | DF | MAS | Tasnim Fitri |
| 44 | FW | MAS | Dzul Ikram Rajeli |
| 54 | GK | MAS | Sharbinee Allawee |
| 60 | GK | MAS | Awang Nur Amirul |
| 77 | FW | MAS | Rahim Razak |
| 79 | FW | MAS | Zharmien Ashraf |
| 80 | GK | MAS | Khairul Fahmi Jamariza |
| 91 | MF | MAS | Fahmi Aimanuddin |

== Squad statistics ==
=== Appearances and goals ===
| No. | Pos | Nat | Player | Total | | League | | FA Cup | | Malaysia Cup | |
| No. | Pos | Nat | Player | Apps | Goals | Apps | Goals | Apps | Goals | Apps | Goals |
|---|---|---|---|---|---|---|---|---|---|---|---|
Goalkeepers:
| 1 | GK | (Malaysia) MAS | Tauffiq Ar Rasyid Johar | 11 | 0 | 8 | 0 | 1 | 0 | 2 | 0 |
| 25 | GK | (Malaysia) MAS | Aquila Abdul Rhaman | 5 | 0 | 4+1 | 0 | 0 | 0 | 0 | 0 |
| 54 | GK | (Malaysia) MAS | Sharbinee Allawee | 10 | 0 | 10 | 0 | 0 | 0 | 0 | 0 |
Defenders:
| 4 | DF | (Malaysia) MAS | Raja Imran Shah | 16 | 2 | 11+3 | 1 | 0 | 0 | 2 | 1 |
| 5 | DF | (Malaysia) MAS | Rahman Ismawi | 12 | 0 | 11+1 | 0 | 0 | 0 | 0 | 0 |
| 14 | DF | (Malaysia) MAS | Kalaiharasan Letchumanan | 7 | 0 | 4+2 | 0 | 1 | 0 | 0 | 0 |
| 16 | DF | (Malaysia) MAS | Stuart Wark | 21 | 0 | 17+1 | 0 | 1 | 0 | 2 | 0 |
| 17 | DF | (Malaysia) MAS | Azizi Ramlee | 13 | 1 | 9+4 | 1 | 0 | 0 | 0 | 0 |
| 28 | DF | (Argentina) ARG | Gonzalo Soto | 23 | 2 | 20 | 2 | 1 | 0 | 2 | 0 |
| 29 | DF | (Cambodia) CAM | Boris Kok | 16 | 4 | 12+1 | 4 | 1 | 0 | 2 | 0 |
| 36 | DF | (Malaysia) MAS | Tasnim Fitri | 5 | 0 | 5 | 0 | 0 | 0 | 0 | 0 |
Midfielders:
| 6 | MF | (Malaysia) MAS | Norman Angkun | 13 | 0 | 3+9 | 0 | 0+1 | 0 | 0 | 0 |
| 8 | MF | (Malaysia) MAS | Khairil Anuar | 13 | 0 | 5+7 | 0 | 0+1 | 0 | 0 | 0 |
| 11 | MF | (Malaysia) MAS | Ashri Chuchu | 15 | 0 | 10+2 | 0 | 1 | 0 | 2 | 0 |
| 15 | MF | (South Korea) KOR | Lee Chang-hoon | 20 | 1 | 12+5 | 1 | 0+1 | 0 | 2 | 0 |
| 20 | MF | (Malaysia) MAS | Abang Azri Fikri | 7 | 0 | 1+5 | 0 | 0+1 | 0 | 0 | 0 |
| 23 | MF | (Malaysia) MAS | Veenod Subramaniam | 22 | 0 | 16+3 | 0 | 1 | 0 | 2 | 0 |
| 26 | MF | (Malaysia) MAS | Amer Saidin | 12 | 0 | 6+3 | 0 | 0+1 | 0 | 0+2 | 0 |
| 27 | MF | (Malaysia) MAS | Chanthuru Suppiah | 21 | 1 | 18 | 1 | 1 | 0 | 2 | 0 |
Forwards:
| 7 | FW | (Malaysia) MAS | Shamie Iszuan | 20 | 2 | 15+4 | 2 | 1 | 0 | 0 | 0 |
| 9 | FW | (Ivory Coast) CIV | Francis Koné | 15 | 3 | 12+2 | 3 | 1 | 0 | 0 | 0 |
| 18 | FW | (Malaysia) MAS | Alphonsus Joseph Willie | 3 | 0 | 0+3 | 0 | 0 | 0 | 0 | 0 |
| 19 | FW | (Malaysia) MAS | Christie Jayaseelan | 2 | 0 | 2 | 0 | 0 | 0 | 0 | 0 |
| 21 | FW | (Nigeria) NGA | Uche Agba | 21 | 3 | 15+3 | 3 | 1 | 0 | 2 | 0 |
| 22 | FW | (Malaysia) MAS | Zahrul Nizwan | 14 | 0 | 11+2 | 0 | 0 | 0 | 1 | 0 |
| 44 | FW | (Malaysia) MAS | Dzul Ikram Rajeli | 3 | 0 | 0+2 | 0 | 0 | 0 | 0+1 | 0 |
| 77 | FW | (Malaysia) MAS | Rahim Razak | 11 | 0 | 1+9 | 0 | 0 | 0 | 1 | 0 |
| 79 | FW | (Malaysia) MAS | Zharmien Ashraf | 13 | 0 | 2+10 | 0 | 0 | 0 | 0+1 | 0 |
Players that have left the club:
| 24 | MF | (Malaysia) MAS | Gopi Rizqi | 5 | 0 | 2+3 | 0 | 0 | 0 | 0 | 0 |

- Source: Sarawak United
