= Hairol Mokhtar =

Malaysian former footballer

Personal information
- Full name: Mohammad Hairol bin Mokhtar
- Date of birth: 18 October 1984 (age 42)
- Place of birth: Kuching, Malaysia
- Height: 1.80 m (5 ft 11 in)
- Position: Centre-back

Youth career
- 2006–2008: DBKU

Senior career*
Years	Team	Apps	(Gls)
2010–2018	Sarawak	70	(6)
2019–2021	Kuching City	9	(1)

International career^{‡}
2013	Malaysia	1	(0)
- * Club domestic league appearances and goals as of 2 February 2018 ‡ National team caps and goals as of 10 September 2013

Mohammad Hairol bin Mokhtar (born 24 October 1984 in Kuching), is a Malaysian former footballer who last played as a centre-back for Kuching City.

== Career ==
=== Sarawak ===
Hairol started out playing for hometown club Dewan Bandaraya Kuching Utara (DBKU) in Kuching Premier League (Liga Perdana Kuching) since 2006. In 2008, he helped Samarahan district to win Sarawak Cup (Piala Sarawak). He signed his first professional contract with Sarawak in 2010 and managed to get into Sarawak's first team by 2011. Hairol replaced Zamri Morshidi as Sarawak captain for the 2012 season. In 2013, he won the Liga Premier with Sarawak getting them promoted.

In September 2016 Hairol was suspended for 6 months and fined RM 2,000 by the Football Association of Malaysia for attacking a referee during a match against Kedah in the Malaysian Cup.

=== National team ===
In September 2013, Hairol received his first national called up for international 'A' match against China. He made his international debut in the 88th minute of the match replacing Amri Yahyah.

=== Kuching FA ===
In 2019, Hairol had join Kuching that will play in League M3, which seen that followed by other teammates Joseph, Dzulazlan, Hafis Saperi, Mazwandi, Ramesh and Iqbal Suhaimi

== Honours ==
=== Domestic ===
Sarawak

- Malaysia Premier League: 2013
