= Shamie Iszuan =

Malaysian footballer

Personal information
- Full name: Nur Shamie Iszuan bin Amin
- Date of birth: 10 September 1995 (age 31)
- Place of birth: Kuching, Malaysia
- Height: 1.72 m (5 ft 8 in)
- Position: Right midfielder

Team information
- Current team: Kuching City

Youth career
- 2008–2012: Tabuan Jaya Sport School
- 2013: Sarawak U19
- 2013: Harimau Muda C
- 2015: Sarawak U21

Senior career*
Years	Team	Apps	(Gls)
2014	SPA FC	0	(0)
2015–2017	Sarawak	33	(4)
2018	PJ Rangers	8	(3)
2019	Sarawak	13	(0)
2020	Negeri Sembilan	7	(1)
2021–2022	Sarawak United	27	(4)
2023	Sri Pahang	10	(0)
2024–	Kuching City	17	(2)
2026	→ Penang (loan)	9	(0)

International career^{‡}
2017	Malaysia U22	8	(5)
2022–	Malaysia	5	(0)
Medal record
Men's football
Representing Malaysia
2016 Nations Cup
Runner-up	2016
Merdeka Cup
Runner-up	2023
AFF Championship
Third place	2022
- * Club domestic league appearances and goals as of 3 May 2026 ‡ National team caps and goals as of January 7, 2023

Nur Shamie Iszuan bin Amin (born 10 September 1995) is a Malaysian professional footballer who plays as a right midfielder for Malaysian Super League club Kuching City, and the Malaysia national team.

== Club career ==
=== Sri Pahang ===
On 10 November 2022, Shamie signed a two-year contract with Sri Pahang.

=== Kuching City ===
In February 2024, Shamie signed a contract with Malaysia Super League club Kuching City.

=== Penang ===
On 10 January 2026, Shamie signed for Malaysia Super League club Penang after leaving Kuching City.

== Career statistics ==
=== Club ===
As of 20 May 2023.

Club performance		League			Cup		League Cup		Continental		Total	
Season	Club	Division	Apps	Goals	Apps	Goals	Apps	Goals	Apps	Goals	Apps	Goals
2015	Sarawak	Malaysia Super League	6	0	0	0	0	0	–	–	0	0
2016	Sarawak	Malaysia Super League	14	2	0	0	0	0	–	–	0	0
2017	Sarawak	Malaysia Super League	13	0	0	0	3	0	–	–	16	0
Total			0	0	0	0	0	0	–	–	0	0
2018	Petaling Jaya Rangers	Malaysia FAM League	0	0	0	0	0	0	–	–	0	0
Total			0	0	0	0	0	0	–	–	0	0
2020	Negeri Sembilan	Malaysia Premier League	0	0	0	0	0	0	–	–	0	0
Total			0	0	0	0	0	0	–	–	0	0
2021	Sarawak United	Malaysia Premier League	0	0	0	0	0	0	–	–	0	0
2022	Sarawak United	Malaysia Super League	0	0	0	0	0	0	–	–	0	0
Total			0	0	0	0	0	0	–	–	0	0
2023	Sri Pahang	Malaysia Super League	10	0	1	0	2	0	–	–	13	0
Total			0	0	0	0	0	0	–	–	0	0
Career Total			0	0	0	0	0	0	–	–	0	0

== Honours ==
Penang

- MFL Challenge Cup runner-up: 2026
