= Rahim Razak =

Malaysian footballer

Personal information
- Full name: Abdul Rahim bin Abdul Razak
- Date of birth: 18 January 1995 (age 31)
- Place of birth: Kuching, Malaysia
- Height: 1.71 m (5 ft 7 1/2 in)
- Position: Attacking midfielder

Team information
- Current team: Kuching City
- Number: 71

Youth career
- 2013–2015: Sarawak U21

Senior career*
| Years | Team | Apps | (Gls) |
| 2016–2019 | Sarawak | 34 | (3) |
| 2020–2022 | Sarawak United | 27 | (5) |
| 2023– | Kuching City | 0 | (0) |

International career
- Malaysia U19
- * Club domestic league appearances and goals as of 10 August 2021

Abdul Rahim bin Abdul Razak (born 18 January 1995) is a Malaysian footballer who plays for Kuching City in the Malaysia Super League as an attacking midfielder.

== Career statistics ==
=== Club ===
As of 26 June 2018

| Club | Season | League | | Cup | | League Cup | | Continental | | Total | |
| Club | Season | Apps | Goals | Apps | Goals | Apps | Goals | Apps | Goals | Apps | Goals |
|---|---|---|---|---|---|---|---|---|---|---|---|
| Sarawak | 2016 | 1 | 0 | 0 | 0 | 0 | 0 | – | – | 1 | 0 |
| Sarawak | 2017 | 19 | 1 | 2 | 1 | 7 | 1 | – | – | 28 | 3 |
| Sarawak | 2018 | 14 | 2 | 1 | 0 | 0 | 0 | – | – | 15 | 2 |
| Sarawak | Total | 0 | 0 | 0 | 0 | 0 | 0 | 0 | 0 | 0 | 0 |
| Career total | | 0 | 0 | 0 | 0 | 0 | 0 | 0 | 0 | 0 | 0 |
