= Aidil Mohamad =

Malaysian footballer

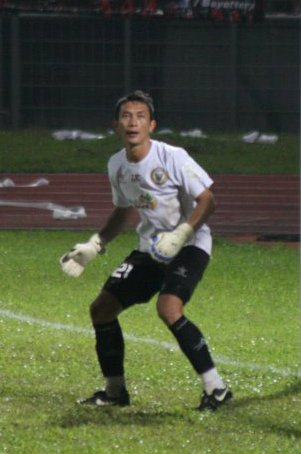

Personal information
- Full name: Aidil Bin Mohamad
- Date of birth: 10 August 1980 (age 46)
- Place of birth: Sarawak, Malaysia
- Height: 1.75 m (5 ft 9 in)
- Position: Goalkeeper

Senior career*
Years	Team	Apps	(Gls)
2007–2015	Sarawak FA	39	(0)
2016	Mukah FA	28	(0)
2017	Sarawak FA	3	(0)
- * Club domestic league appearances and goals as of July 26, 2017

Aidil Bin Mohamad (born 10 August 1980 in Sarawak) is a former Malaysian footballer who played as a goalkeeper for Sarawak in the Liga Super.

A veteran goalkeeper for Sarawak, Aidil played for Sarawak senior team starting in 2007. He was a leading figure to Sarawak promotion campaign in the 2011 Malaysia Premier League, only conceding 16 goals throughout the season as Sarawak finished runners-up in the league.

At the end of 2015 Malaysia Super League season, he announced his retirement from football. A year later, he returned to Sarawak for the 2017 Malaysia Super League campaign.
