= Demerson =

Brazilian footballer (born 1986)

Personal information
- Full name: Demerson Bruno Costa
- Date of birth: 16 March 1986 (age 40)
- Place of birth: Belo Horizonte, Brazil
- Height: 1.85 m (6 ft 1 in)
- Position: Centre-back

Team information
- Current team: PSS Sleman (interim head coach)

Youth career
- 2002–2004: Atlético Mineiro
- 2003–2004: → América Mineiro (loan)

Senior career*
Years	Team	Apps	(Gls)
2004–2007	Corinthians-AL	25	(2)
2007	→ Luziânia (loan)	4	(0)
2007–2008	Itaúna	19	(0)
2008–2009	Cruzeiro	4	(0)
2008	→ Goytacaz (loan)	17	(2)
2009	→ Cabofriense (loan)	15	(0)
2009–2012	Coritiba	76	(3)
2011	→ Botafogo-SP (loan)	7	(0)
2013–2014	Bahia	64	(1)
2014–2015	Jiangxi Liansheng	31	(2)
2015–2016	Paraná	6	(0)
2016–2017	Chapecoense	5	(0)
2017–2018	Sarawak	26	(2)
2018–2019	Bali United	16	(0)
2019–2020	Persela Lamongan	15	(0)
2020–2021	Sarawak United	12	(1)
2021–2022	Persela Lamongan	30	(0)
Total		372	(13)

Managerial career
- 2022–2023: Borneo Samarinda (chief scout)
- 2023–2025: Borneo Samarinda (assistant)
- 2025: Borneo Samarinda (caretaker)
- 2025–2026: PSS Sleman (team official)
- 2026–: PSS Sleman (assistant)
- 2026–: PSS Sleman (interim)
- * Club domestic league appearances and goals

Demerson Bruno Costa (born 16 March 1986), simply known as Demerson, is a Brazilian former footballer who played as a centre-back. He is currently the interim head coach of the Indonesia Super League club, PSS Sleman.

In 2011, while playing for Coritiba Foot Ball Club, Demerson won the Most Uninterrupted Winning Matches of the World award on Guinness World Records 2013 Edition. Demerson is also remembered for being part of the Associação Chapecoense de Futebol in 2016, the team that suffered the most tragic air crash in FootBall History LaMia Flight 2933. Despite being part of the squad, Demerson did not board the flight for the 2016 Copa Sudamericana final. Demerson's current club is Sarawak United in the Malaysian Premier League.

== Club career ==
After representing hometown clubs Atlético Mineiro and América Mineiro as a youth, Demerson made his senior debut with Corinthians Alagoano in 2004. After a loan stint at Luziânia and a short spell at Itaúna, he signed for Série A club Cruzeiro in 2008.

Demerson being loaned out to Goytacaz and Cabofriense. On 19 May 2009, he signed for Coritiba.

Demerson made his debut on 24 May 2009, in Coritiba Foot Ball Club, by achieving national recognition in football. He captured two State League titles in Campeonato Paranaense (2010,2012) and the National Title of Campeonato Brasileiro Série B in 2010. He reached the Guinness Book record "World's Most Victorious Team" in 2011, totaling twenty-four consecutive wins.

On 22 January 2013, Demerson signed a two-year contract with Bahia. He was an undisputed starter for the club during the 2014 season, he was elected the best defender of the Campeonato Baiano in the 2014 season. He captured one State League title in Campeonato Baiano

On 19 February 2015, Demerson moved abroad, after agreeing to a contract with China League One side Jiangxi Liansheng F.C. where he was captain in the 2015 season and played in thirty-one matches. On 29 February of the following year, he returned to his home country, signing for Paraná, but left the club on 4 May 2016 after being hired by Associação Chapecoense de Futebol.

On 12 May 2016, Demerson joined Chapecoense.

Demerson did not board LaMia Airlines Flight 2933 for the 2016 Copa Sudamericana Finals, which crashed and killed 19 of his teammates. Chapecoense named Copa Sudamericana winners after plane crash. As a result, Demerson left Brazil and signed with Sarawak for the 2017 Malaysia Super League Season.

After spending two years playing the Indonesian football clubs, Bali United and Persela Lamongan, he returned to Malaysia as a new signing for Sarawak United in the Malaysia Premier League.

== Career statistics ==
Club	Season	League			State League		Cup		Continental		Other		Total	
Club	Season	Division	Apps	Goals	Apps	Goals	Apps	Goals	Apps	Goals	Apps	Goals	Apps	Goals
Itaúna	2008	Mineiro Módulo II	—		13	0	—		—		—		13	0
Goytacaz	2008	Carioca Série B	—		17	2	—		—		—		17	2
Cabofriense	2009	Carioca	—		11	0	—		—		—		11	0
Coritiba	2009	Série A	10	1	—		—		1 (Note: Appearance(s) in Copa Sudamericana)	0	—		11	1
Coritiba	2010	Série B	8	0	0	0	1	0	—		—		9	0
Coritiba	2011	Série A	1	0	0	0	5	0	—		—		6	0
Coritiba	2012	Série A	15	0	11	1	9	0	1	0	—		36	1
Coritiba	Subtotal		34	1	11	1	15	0	2	0	—		62	2
Botafogo-SP (loan)	2011	Paulista	—		7	0	—		—		—		7	0
Bahia	2013	Série A	11	0	5	0	0	0	3	0	1 (Note: Appearance(s) in Copa do Nordeste)	0	20	0
Bahia	2014	Série A	28	1	7	0	5	0	1	0	0	0	41	1
Bahia	Subtotal		39	1	12	0	5	0	4	0	1	0	61	1
Paraná	2016	Série B	0	0	5	0	2	0	—		—		7	0
Chapecoense	2016	Série A	3	0	—		—		1	0	—		4	0
Career total			76	2	65	3	22	0	7	0	1	0	325	7

== Managerial career ==
After retiring in April 2022, Demerson was appointed chief scout at Borneo Samarinda in July.

== Managerial statistics ==
As of match played 20 November 2026

Managerial record by team and tenure
Team	Nat.	From	To	Record								Ref.
Team	Nat.	From	To	G	W	D	L	GF	GA	GD	Win %	Ref.
Borneo Samarinda (caretaker)	(Indonesia)	12 January 2025	15 January 2025	1	0	0	1	1	3	−2	0.00	
PSS Sleman (interim)	(Indonesia)	17 November 2026	Present	1	0	0	1	0	3	−3	0.00	
Career Total				2	0	0	2	1	6	−5	0.00	

== Honours ==
Coritiba

- Winner of Campeonato Paranaense: 2010 and 2012
- Winner of Campeonato Brasileiro Série B: 2010
- Co Winner of Copa do Brasil : 2011 and 2012

Bahia

- Winner of Campeonato Baiano: 2014
- Individual Award of Best Central Defender in Campeonato Baiano: 2014

Chapecoense

- Winner of internacional Copa Sudamericana: 2016

Bali United

- Co-Winner of Indonesia President's Cup: 2018
