= Tommy Mawat Bada =

Malaysian footballer

Personal information
- Full name: Tommy Mawat anak Bada
- Date of birth: 26 June 1995 (age 31)
- Place of birth: Belaga, Sarawak, Malaysia
- Height: 1.73 m (5 ft 8 in)
- Positions: Left-back; winger

Team information
- Current team: DPMM FC (on loan from Kuala Lumpur City)
- Number: 3

Youth career
- 2014–2015: Sarawak U-21

Senior career*
Years	Team	Apps	(Gls)
2015–2017	Sarawak	34	(4)
2018	Petaling Jaya Rangers	7	(5)
2019	PKNS	11	(0)
2020	Kuching City	10	(0)
2021	Sarawak United	22	(2)
2022	Sabah	10	(0)
2023	Negeri Sembilan	21	(2)
2024–2025	Perak	23	(2)
2025–	Kuala Lumpur City	0	(0)
2025–	→ DPMM (loan)	25	(1)

International career^{‡}
2017–2018	Malaysia U23	4	(0)
- * Club domestic league appearances and goals as of 20 November 2026 ‡ National team caps and goals as of 20 August 2018

Tommy Mawat anak Bada (born 26 June 1995) is a Malaysian footballer who plays as a left-back for Malaysia Super League side Brunei DPMM FC, on loan from Kuala Lumpur City. He also can operate as a midfielder and winger. He previously played for Perak, Negeri Sembilan FC, Sabah, and Kuching City. He was also part of Malaysia's under-23 national team during the 2018 Asian Games.

== Club career ==
A Sarawak FA youth player, Tommy played for the senior team for two seasons, before joining PJ Rangers in November 2017 for the 2018 season, together with 2 other players from Sarawak FA. He was officially announced as a new Negeri Sembilan FC player on January 12, 2023.

In October 2024, Tommy responded publicly to racist comments directed at him on social media after an altercation with Johor Darul Ta'zim player Arif Aiman Hanapi. Following the clash, which led to yellow cards for both players, Tommy took to Instagram to call for respectful criticism, urging fans to avoid bringing race or family into their comments. He expressed pride in his Dayak heritage and addressed the racial slurs, asking his critics not to target his ethnicity and reminding them of the impact such comments have on the Dayak community. The Football Association of Malaysia is currently investigating the incident.

On 8 June 2025, Brunei DPMM FC announced the signing of Tommy who last played for Perak for the 2025–26 season. The nature of his deal as a loan transfer from KL City was afterwards revealed by his agent. He scored his first goal for DPMM against former club Sabah in a 1–3 victory on 20 December. He extended his stay with the Bruneian club for the 2026–27 season.

== International career ==
He has been called to Malaysia national under-23 football team, and were included in the 23-men squad for the 2018 Asian Games by head coach Ong Kim Swee.
