= Shahril Sa'ari =

Malaysian footballer

Shahril Saa'ri
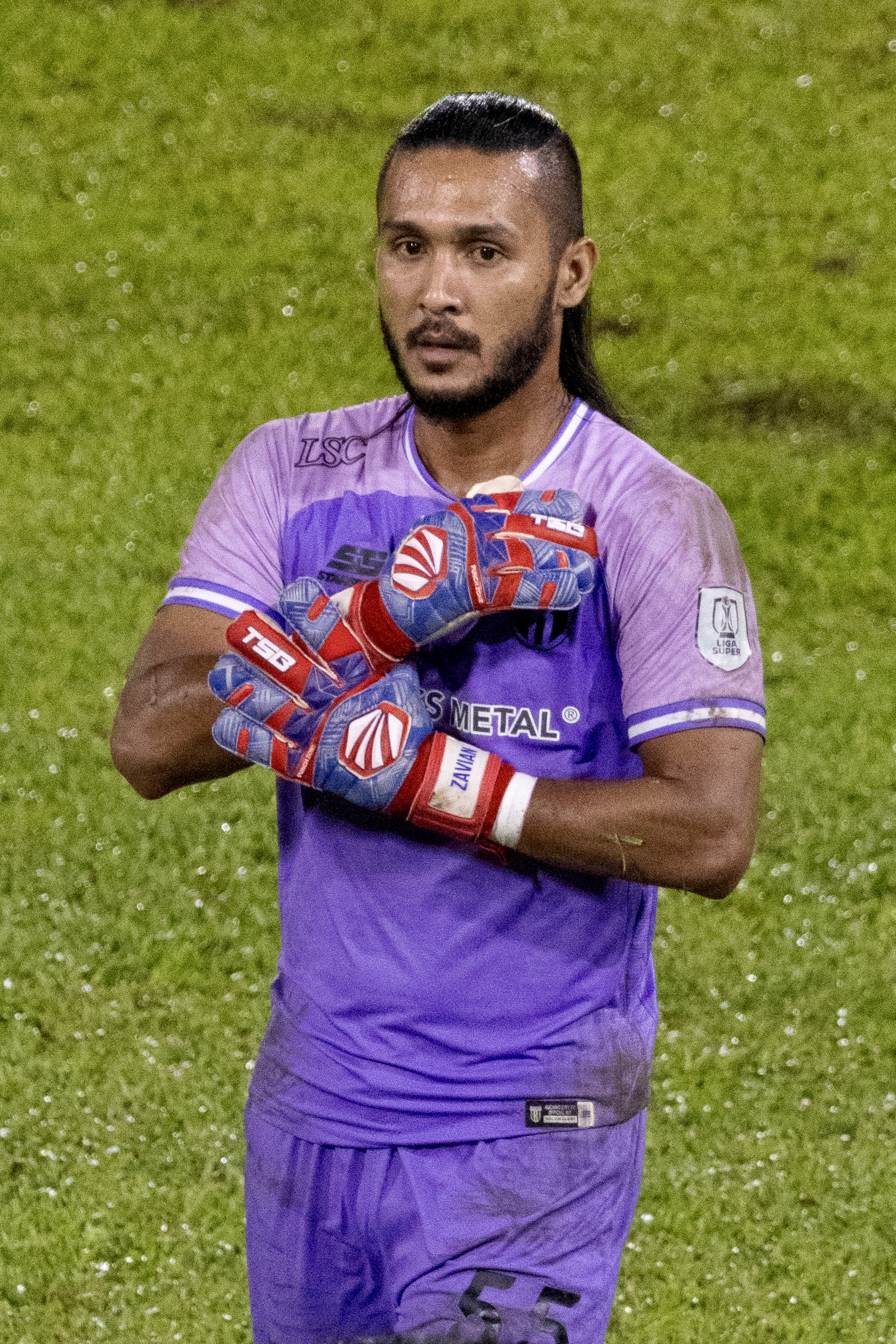
- Shahril with Kuching City in 2025

Personal information
- Full name: Mohd Shahril bin Sa'ari
- Date of birth: 7 March 1990 (age 36)
- Place of birth: Terengganu, Malaysia
- Height: 1.80 m (5 ft 11 in)
- Position: Goalkeeper

Team information
- Current team: Kuching City
- Number: 55

Youth career
- 2007–2008: Terengganu

Senior career*
Years	Team	Apps	(Gls)
2009–2010	T–Team	0	(0)
2011	Terengganu	0	(0)
2012	Harimau Muda	0	(0)
2013	Sabah	19	(0)
2014–2015	T–Team	20	(0)
2016–2017	Sarawak	31	(0)
2018	PKNS	16	(0)
2019	Perlis	3	(0)
2019	PDRM	15	(0)
2020–2022	Kedah Darul Aman	32	(0)
2023	Kelantan United	6	(0)
2024–	Kuching City	9	(0)

International career^{‡}
2012	Malaysia U-23	1	(0)
- * Club domestic league appearances and goals as of 4 November 2023 ‡ National team caps and goals as of 14 January 2017

Mohd Shahril bin Sa'ari (born 7 March 1990) is a Malaysian footballer who plays as a goalkeeper for Malaysia Super League club Kuching City.

== Club career ==
Shahril start his career with a club based in Kuala Terengganu, T-Team. In 2011 he was signed as the third choice goalkeeper for Terengganu. In December 2011, he was selected into the Harimau Muda program.

In 2013 season he signed with Sabah. In 2014 season, he return to Kuala Terengganu and signed with T-Team. In 2016, Shahril signed with Sarawak for 2 years where he made 31 Malaysia Super League appearances.

In 2018 he signed with PKNS and made 16 league appearances and reach the Malaysia FA Cup semi final after beating Perak 4–3 on aggregate.

Shahril signed with Perlis in 2019 and played 3 league matches. He was named as the player of the match against UiTM. After the match against JDT II, Malaysian Football League (MFL) canceled Perlis participation in the league due to their financial planning were insufficient to manage the team for competition in the M-League. He later signed with PDRM.

Shahril signed with Kedah in 2020 season. In a 2020 AFC Champions League play-off round, he made a total of 15 saves against FC Seoul.

== International career ==
Shahril made an appearances for Malaysia under 23 team on 2 October 2012 friendly match against Cambodia senior team. Malaysia under 23 beat Cambodia senior side 2–1.

In 2018, he received a call up for 2019 AFC Asian Cup qualification against Lebanon. He was the unused substituted in that match.

== Career statistics ==
=== Club ===
As of 4 November 2023

Club	Season	League		Cup		League Cup		Others		Total	
Club	Season	Apps	Goals	Apps	Goals	Apps	Goals	Apps	Goals	Apps	Goals
T-Team	2009	0	0	0	0	0	0	–		0	0
T-Team	2010	0	0	0	0	0	0	–		0	0
T-Team	Total	0	0	0	0	0	0	–		0	0
Terengganu	2011	0	0	0	0	0	0	–		0	0
Terengganu	Total	0	0	0	0	0	0	–		0	0
Harimau Muda	2012	0	0	1	0	0	0	–		1	0
Harimau Muda	Total	0	0	1	0	0	0	–		1	0
Sabah	2013	19	0	2	0	–		1 (Note: Appearances in 2013 Malaysia Cup play-off)	0	22	0
Sabah	Total	19	0	2	0	–		1	0	22	0
T-Team	2014	20	0	1	0	4	0	–		25	0
T-Team	2015	0	0	0	0	0	0	–		0	0
T-Team	Total	20	0	1	0	4	0	–		25	0
Sarawak	2016	12	0	1	0	5	0	–		18	0
Sarawak	2017	19	0	3	0	4	0	–		26	0
Sarawak	Total	31	0	4	0	9	0	–		44	0
PKNS	2018	16	0	4	0	1	0	–		21	0
PKNS	Total	16	0	4	0	1	0	–		21	0
Perlis	2019	3	0	0	0	0	0	–		3	0
Perlis	Total	3	0	0	0	0	0	–		3	0
PDRM	2019	15	0	2	0	3	0	–		20	0
PDRM	Total	15	0	2	0	3	0	–		20	0
Kedah	2020	5	0	–		0	0	1 (Note: Appearances in AFC Champions League)	0	6	0
Kedah	2021	17	0	–		2	0	–		19	0
Kedah	2022	10	0	0	0	0	0	1 (Note: Appearances in AFC Cup)	0	11	0
Kedah	Total	32	0	0	0	2	0	2	0	36	0
Kelantan United	2023	6	0	0	0	2	0	2 (Note: Appearances in 2023 MFL Challenge Cup)	0	10	0
Kelantan United	Total	6	0	0	0	2	0	2	0	10	0
Kuching City	2023	0	0	0	0	0	0	0	0	0	0
Kuching City	Total	0	0	0	0	0	0	0	0	0	0
Career total		142	0	14	0	21	0	5	0	182	0
