= Lee Jong-ho (footballer, born 1986) =

South Korean footballer

Personal information
- Full name: Lee Jong-ho
- Date of birth: July 31, 1986 (age 40)
- Place of birth: South Korea
- Height: 1.82 m (5 ft 11 1/2 in)
- Position: Striker

Youth career
- 2000–2002: Paris Saint-Germain

Senior career*
Years	Team	Apps	(Gls)
2002–2003	Namgang High School		
2004–2013	Goyang Zaicro FC		
2014–2015	Paju Citizen FC		
2016	Preah Khan Reach FC	14	(4)
2017	Sarawak FA	10	(0)
Korean name
Hangul	이종호
RR	I Jongho
MR	I Chongho
- * Club domestic league appearances and goals

Lee Jong-ho (born July 31, 1986) is a South Korean footballer who plays as striker. His main position is a striker.

Lee is a graduate of Paris Saint-Germain Academy, and previously played for Hallelujah (now Goyang Zaicro) in the K League Challenge in his native South Korea and in the FAS Premier League in Singapore.
