= Iqbal Suhimi =

Malaysian footballer

Personal information
- Full name: Mohd Iqbal bin Mohd Suhimi
- Date of birth: 10 September 1984 (age 42)
- Place of birth: Pahang, Malaysia
- Height: 1.80 m (5 ft 11 in)
- Position: Goalkeeper

Team information
- Current team: Kuching
- Number: 25

Youth career
- 2001–2003: Pahang U-19

Senior career*
Years	Team	Apps	(Gls)
2003–2008	Pahang		
2009	Proton		
2010–2011	Selangor	17	(0)
2012–2013	T-Team	24	(0)
2014	ATM		
2015–2016	Sarawak	29	(0)
2018	Sarawak	4	(0)
2018–	Kuching City	19	(0)

Managerial career
- 2022: Kuching City (Goalkeeper coach)
- * Club domestic league appearances and goals as of 26 June 2018

Mohd Iqbal bin Mohd Suhimi (born 10 September 1984) is a Malaysian footballer who plays for Kuching City as a goalkeeper.
