= Mazwandi =

Malaysian footballer

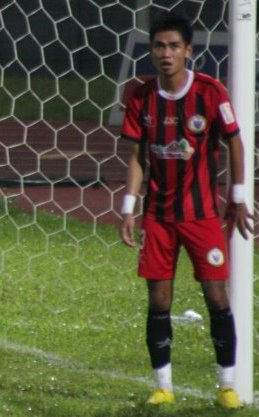

Personal information
- Full name: Mazwandi bin Zekeria
- Date of birth: 24 June 1989 (age 37)
- Place of birth: Sarawak, Malaysia
- Height: 1.76 m (5 ft 9 1/2 in)
- Position: Right back

Youth career
- 2005–2006: Bukit Jalil Sports School
- 2007: Sarawak U-21

Senior career*
Years	Team	Apps	(Gls)
2008	PDRM F.A.	21	(0)
2009–2018	Sarawak	42	(2)
2019–2024	Kuching City	34	(0)
- * Club domestic league appearances and goals as of June 30, 2019

Mazwandi bin Zekeria (born 24 June 1989 in Sarawak) is a Malaysian footballer who last played for Kuching City in the Malaysia Super League as a right back.

== Career ==
Mazwandi was born in Kuching, Sarawak, Malaysia. He attended Bukit Jalil Sport School before playing for Sarawak President Cup team. He started his career with Polis Di-Raja Malaysia in 2008. After just one season playing for team, he joined his state team Sarawak.

== Honours ==
=== Clubs ===
Sarawak

- Liga Premier: 2013
