= Ronny Harun =

Malaysian footballer

Personal information
- Full name: Ronny Harun
- Date of birth: 19 January 1984 (age 42)
- Place of birth: Sabah, Malaysia
- Height: 1.75 m (5 ft 9 in)
- Position: Defender

Team information
- Current team: Petaling Jaya Rangers
- Number: 2

Youth career
- 2002–2004: Sabah U-21

Senior career*
Years	Team	Apps	(Gls)
2003–2006	Sabah FA	25	(1)
2007–2009	Kedah FA	36	(2)
2010–2011	Terengganu FA	18	(0)
2012	Sabah FA	19	(2)
2013–2017	Sarawak FA	50	(0)
2018–	Petaling Jaya Rangers	6	(0)

International career^{‡}
2003–2006	Malaysia U23	13	(0)
2005–	Malaysia	14	(0)
- * Club domestic league appearances and goals as of 29 July 2018 ‡ National team caps and goals as of 17 November 2016

Ronny Harun (born 19 January 1984 in Sipitang, Sabah) is a Malaysian professional footballer who plays for Petaling Jaya Rangers in the Malaysia FAM League. His primary position is as a left back but he can also play as a centre-back.

On 14 August 2017, Ronny was announced to receive the Best Asian Football Federation Award XI 16 to be held in Bali, Indonesia on 23 September 2017.

== Club career ==
=== Sabah ===
Ronny started his football career with Sabah. He was part of Sabah squad that finished as runners-up in 2002 and 2003 Malaysia Cup.

=== Kedah ===
In 2007, Ronny joined Kedah where he won back to back 2006–2007 and 2007–2008 Malaysia Super League title, back to back 2007 and 2008 Malaysia FA Cup and back to back 2007 and 2008 Malaysia Cup.

=== Terengganu ===
In 2010, Ronny joined Terengganu.

=== Sabah ===
In 2012, Ronny returned to his hometown to signed for Sabah.

=== Sarawak ===
The following season, Ronny moved to intercity rivals, Sarawak.

=== Petaling Jaya Rangers ===
On 20 December 2017, Ronny joined fifth tier league, Petaling Jaya Rangers playing in the Selangor League.

== International career ==
Ronny was also the member of Malaysia U-23 team during 2003 until 2006. It was Allan Harris who took Ronny into Malaysia U-23 squad. He played in 2006 Asian Games, 2004 Olympic Games qualifier, 2003 SEA Games and 2005 SEA Games. His biggest achievement with the team is becoming the bronze medalist at the 2003 and 2005 SEA Games.

Ronny has represented the senior team several times.

== Honours ==
=== Club ===
Kedah

- Malaysia Super League: 2006–2007, 2007–2008
- Malaysia FA Cup: 2007, 2008
- Malaysia Cup: 2007, 2008

Terangganu

- Malaysia FA Cup: 2011

Sarawak

- Malaysia Premier League: 2013

=== International ===
Malaysia U-23

- Southeast Asian Games: Bronze medals 2003, 2005

=== Individual ===
- AFF Championship Best XI: 2016
- ASEAN Football Federation Best XI: 2017
