= Alif Hassan =

Malaysian footballer

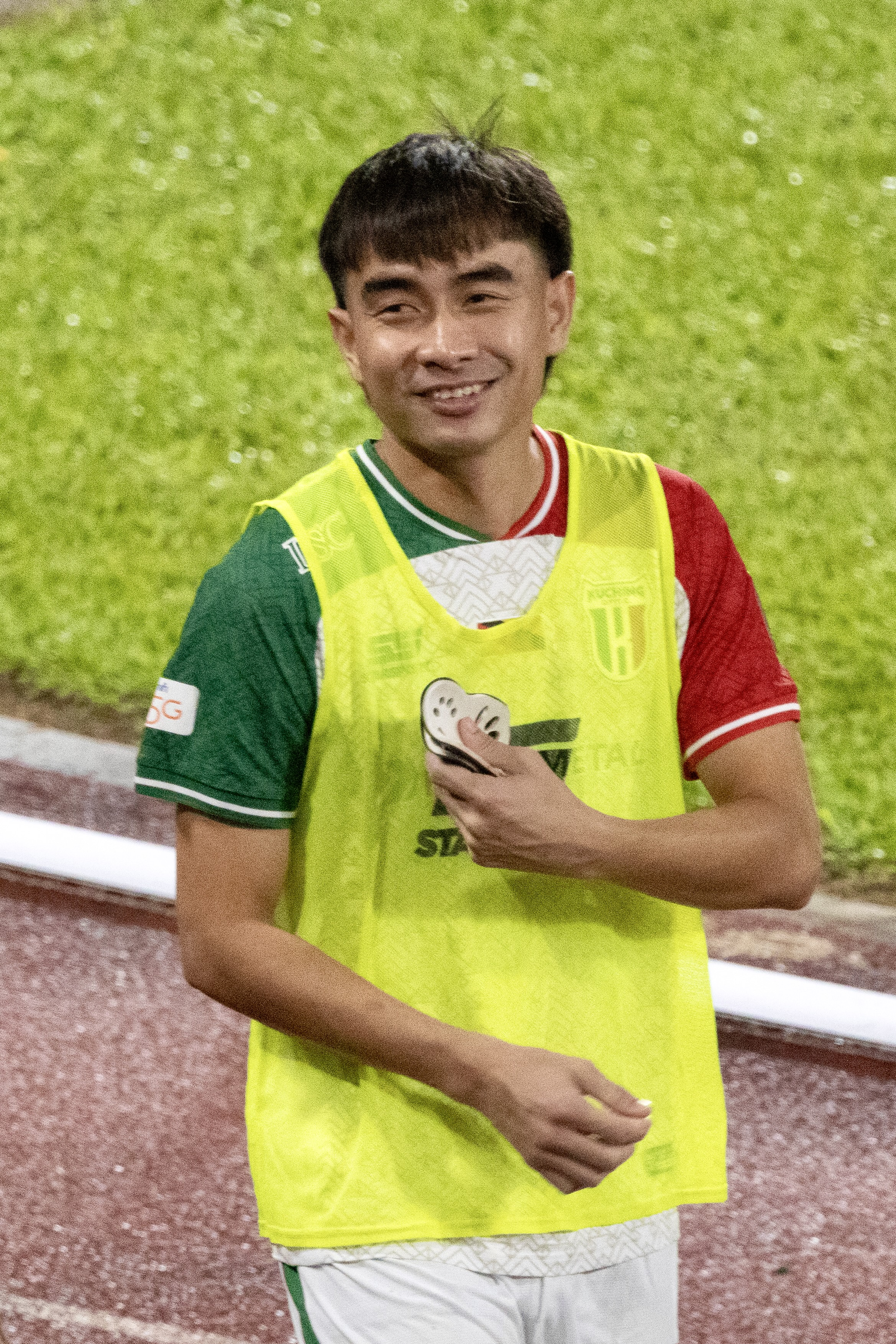
- Alif with Kuching City in 2025

Personal information
- Full name: Mohamad Alif bin Hassan
- Date of birth: 14 May 1994 (age 32)
- Place of birth: Sarawak, Malaysia
- Height: 1.71 m (5 ft 7 1/2 in)
- Position: Midfielder

Team information
- Current team: Kuching City
- Number: 44

Youth career
- 2015: Sarawak U-21

Senior career*
Years	Team	Apps	(Gls)
2015–2019	Sarawak	11	(2)
2020	Sarawak United	8	(1)
2021–	Kuching City	41	(0)
- * Club domestic league appearances and goals as of September 7, 2021

Mohamad Alif bin Hassan (born 14 May 1994) is a Malaysian footballer who plays as a midfielder who captains the Malaysia Super League club Kuching City.
