= Dzulazlan Ibrahim =

Malaysian footballer

Personal information
- Full name: Mohammad Dzulazlan bin Ibrahim
- Date of birth: 19 November 1988 (age 37)
- Place of birth: Sarawak, Malaysia
- Height: 1.66 m (5 ft 5 in)
- Position: Right-back

Team information
- Current team: Kuching City
- Number: 13

Youth career
- 2007–2009: Sarawak U-21

Senior career*
Years	Team	Apps	(Gls)
2009–2018	Sarawak	79	(1)
2019–	Kuching City	39	(2)
- * Club domestic league appearances and goals as of 2 February 2018

Mohammad Dzulazlan bin Ibrahim (born 19 November 1988 in Sarawak) is a Malaysian footballer who plays as right-back for Kuching City in the Malaysia Super League.
