= Adam Shreen =

Malaysian footballer (born 1993)

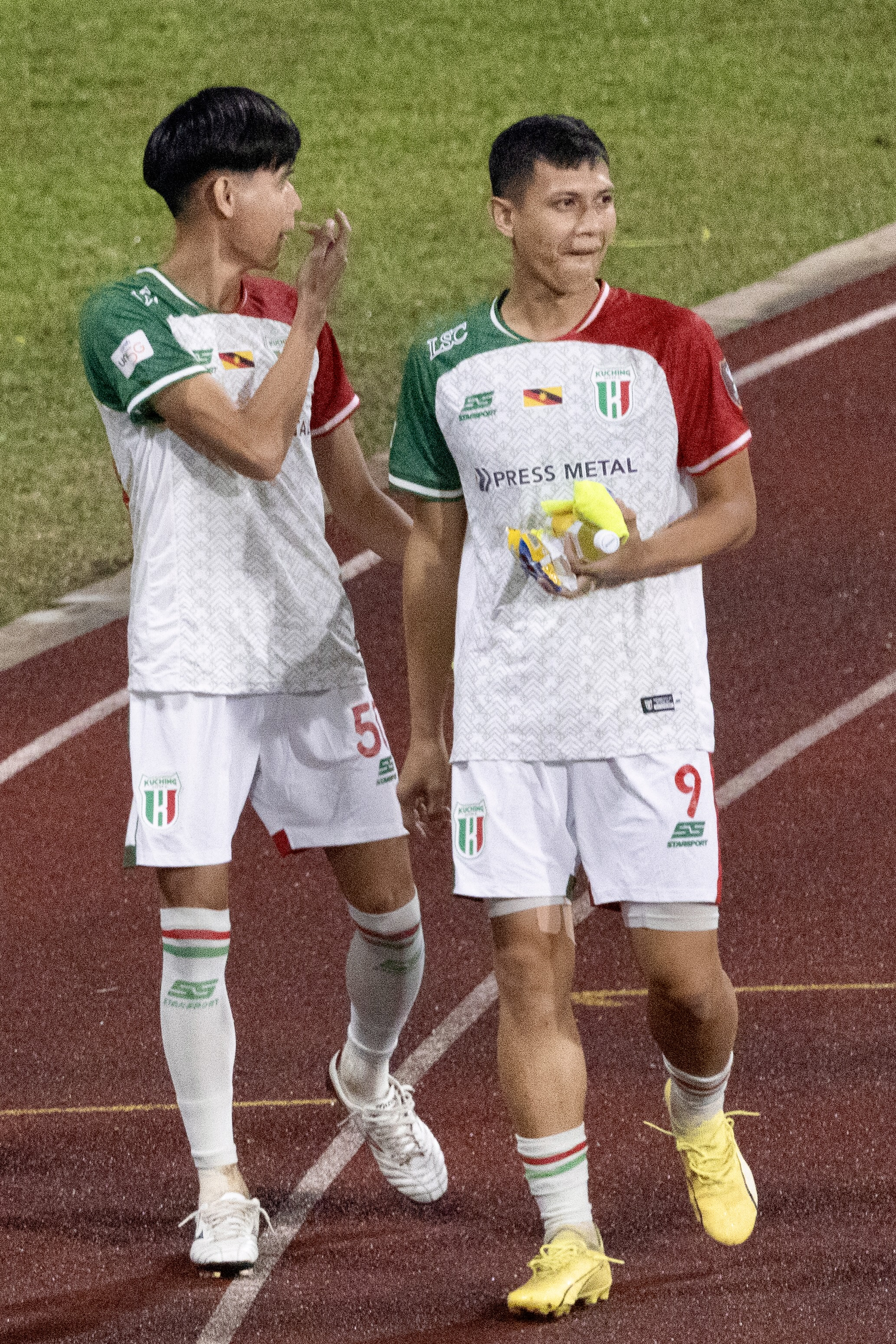
- Diego Baggio (left) and Adam Shreen (right) with Kuching City in 2025

Personal information
- Full name: Mohamad Shreen bin Tambi
- Date of birth: 22 February 1993 (age 33)
- Place of birth: Limbang, Malaysia
- Height: 1.70 m (5 ft 7 in)
- Positions: Midfielder; defender

Team information
- Current team: Carabat F.C.
- Number: 25

Youth career
- 2013: Harimau Muda B

Senior career*
Years	Team	Apps	(Gls)
2013–2014	Harimau Muda B	3	(0)
2015–2017	Sarawak	43	(0)
2018–2019	PJ Rangers	7	(0)
2019–2020	Sarawak	25	(0)
2021–2025	Kuching City	24	(1)
2025–	Carabat F.C.	0	(0)

International career^{‡}
2015	Malaysia U22	1	(0)
- * Club domestic league appearances and goals as of July 29, 2018 ‡ National team caps and goals as of December 17, 2017

Mohamad Adam Shreen bin Tambi (born 22 February 1993), previously known as Shreen anak Tambi, is a Malaysian professional footballer who plays as midfielder for Malaysia A3 Community League side Carabat F.C.
