= 2019 Malaysia Cup final =

Association football championship match between Kedah and Johor Darul Ta'zim in 2019

- Event: 2019 Malaysia Cup
Kedah	Johor Darul Ta'zim
0	3
- Date: 2 November 2019
- Venue: Bukit Jalil National Stadium, Kuala Lumpur
- Man of the Match: Safawi Rasid (Johor Darul Ta'zim)
- Referee: Nazmi Nasaruddin
- Attendance: 83,420
- Weather: Partly cloudy 27 °C (81 °F)

The 2019 Malaysia Cup final was a football match which were played on 2 November 2019, to determine the champion of the 2019 Malaysia Cup. It was the final of the 93rd edition of the Malaysia Cup, competition organised by the Football Association of Malaysia. The match was played at the Bukit Jalil National Stadium in Kuala Lumpur between Kedah and Johor Darul Ta'zim.

Johor Darul Ta'zim won the final 3–0, achieving their 2nd title overall.

== Route to the final ==
Note: In all results below, the score of the finalist is given first.

Kedah				Round	Johor Darul Ta'zim			
Opponent	Result			Group stage	Opponent	Result		
Negeri Sembilan	3–1 (A)			Matchday 1	UiTM	3–1 (H)		
Terengganu	0–2 (H)			Matchday 2	Petaling Jaya City	4–2 (H)		
PKNS	1–1 (A)			Matchday 3	PKNP	2–2 (A)		
PKNS	3–2 (H)			Matchday 4	PKNP	5–0 (H)		
Terengganu	3–2 (A)			Matchday 5	Petaling Jaya City	3–2 (A)		
Negeri Sembilan	4–2 (H)			Matchday 6	UiTM	2–1 (A)		
Group A winners: Pos / Team / Pld / Pts; 1 / Kedah / 6 / 13; 2 / Terengganu / 6 / 12; 3 / Negeri Sembilan / 6 / 6; 4 / PKNS / 6 / 4; Source: FAM MFL				Final standings	Group B winners: Pos / Team / Pld / Pts; 1 / Johor Darul Ta'zim / 6 / 16; 2 / PKNP / 6 / 10; 3 / Petaling Jaya City / 6 / 9; 4 / UiTM / 6 / 0; Source: FAM MFL			
Opponent	Agg.	1st leg	2nd leg	Knockout phase	Opponent	Agg.	1st leg	2nd leg
PKNP	6–2	2–1 (A)	4–1 (H)	Quarter-finals	Terengganu	5–1	1–0 (A)	4–1 (H)
Pahang	8–8 (a)	3–3 (H)	5–5 (a.e.t.) (A)	Semi-finals	Selangor	5–1	2–1 (H)	3–0 (A)

== Match ==
=== Details ===
Team List and Official

2 November 2019
21:00 UTC+8

Kedah	0–3	Johor Darul Ta'zim
	Report	Velázquez 27'; Safawi 35'; Syafiq 58'

Bukit Jalil National Stadium, Bukit Jalil
Attendance: 83,420
Referee: Nazmi Nasaruddin

Kedah	Johor Darul Ta'zim

GK	18	(Malaysia) Ifwat Akmal
RB	16	(Malaysia) Amirul Hisyam
CB	13	(Malaysia) Khairul Helmi
CB	11	(Singapore) Shakir Hamzah	(yellow card) 21'
LB	25	(Malaysia) Azmeer Yusof		(substituted off) 17'
CM	7	(Malaysia) Baddrol Bakhtiar (c)
CM	55	(Malaysia) David Rowley
RW	9	(Malaysia) Zaquan Adha	(yellow card) 9'
AM	60	(Kyrgyzstan) Edgar Bernhardt		(substituted off) 72'
LW	29	(Malaysia) Farhan Roslan		(substituted off) 69'
CF	10	(Argentina) Jonatan Bauman	(yellow card) 14'
Substitutes:
GK	1	(Malaysia) Abdul Hadi
DF	5	(Malaysia) Norfiqrie Talib		(substituted in) 17'
DF	17	(Malaysia) Syazwan Tajudin
MF	20	(Malaysia) Fadzrul Danel		(substituted in) 72'
MF	21	(Malaysia) Fayadh Zulkifli		(substituted in) 69'
FW	4	(Malaysia) Azamuddin Akil
FW	9	(Spain) Fernando Rodríguez
Head Coach:
(Malaysia) Aidil Sharin

GK	1	(Malaysia) Farizal Marlias
RB	12	(Malaysia) S. Kunanlan
CB	7	(Malaysia) Aidil Zafuan	(yellow card) 45+2'
CB	33	(Brazil) Maurício	(yellow card) 31'
LB	22	(Malaysia) Corbin-Ong
CM	4	(Malaysia) Afiq Fazail		(substituted off) 73'
CM	14	(Singapore) Hariss Harun (c)
CM	18	(Argentina) Leandro Velázquez		(substituted off) 90'
RF	29	(Malaysia) Safawi Rasid
CF	8	(Brazil) Diogo		(substituted off) 25'
LF	11	(Iraq) Gonzalo Cabrera
Substitutions:
GK	24	(Malaysia) Izham Tarmizi
DF	3	(Malaysia) Adam Nor Azlin
DF	27	(Malaysia) Fadhli Shas
MF	16	(Malaysia) Syamer Kutty		(substituted in) 73'
MF	21	(Malaysia) Nazmi Faiz		(substituted in) 90'
FW	9	(Malaysia) Hazwan Bakri
FW	28	(Malaysia) Syafiq Ahmad		(substituted in) 25'
Head Coach:
(Mexico) Benjamín Mora

Officials

- Assistant referees:
  - Zairul Khalil Tan
  - Junaidy Abd Samad
- Fourth Official:
  - Razlan Joffri Ali
- Additional assistant referees:
  - Zulkarnain Zakaria
  - Farhan Abdul Aziz

Match Rules

- 90 minutes.
- 30 minutes of extra time if necessary.
- Penalty shoot-out if scores still level.
- Seven named substitutes.
- Maximum of three substitutions.

=== Statistics ===
Overall
Statistic	Kedah	Johor Darul Ta'zim
Goals scored	0	3
Total shots	7	11
Shots on target	5	7
Saves	0	0
Ball possession	35%	65%
Corner kicks	3	4
Fouls committed	19	16
Offsides	1	2
Yellow cards	3	2
Red cards	0	0

== See also ==
- 2019 Malaysia FA Cup Final
