= 2019 Kedah FA season =

Kedah
2019 season
- President: Mukhriz Mahathir
- Manager: Al-Naliq Hasmi Abu Hassan
- Head coach: Aidil Sharin
- Stadium: Darul Aman Stadium
- Malaysia Super League: 4th
- Malaysia FA Cup: Winners
- Malaysia Cup: Runners-up
- Top goalscorer: League: Fernando Rodríguez (9); All: Fernando Rodríguez (21)
| Home colours | Away colours | Third colours |

The 2019 season was Kedah's 11th season in the Malaysia Super League since its inception in 2004. The season covers the period from 1 February to 21 July 2019.

== Management team ==
| Position | Name |
|---|---|
| Head coach | (Singapore) Aidil Sharin |
| Assistant head coach | (Malaysia) Victor Andrag |
| Assistant coach | (Malaysia) Azmi Mohamed |
| Goalkeeper coach | (Malaysia) Effendy Kamsah |
| Fitness coach | (Singapore) Azmi Ibrahim |
| Team doctor | (Malaysia) Dr. Jasminder Singh |
| Physiotherapist | (Malaysia) Muhammad Nur'Illya Samsuddin |
| Medical officer | (Malaysia) Mohd Shahrizal Mohd Nadzir |

== Players ==
| No. | Name | Nat | Date of birth (age) | Signed from | Contract since | Contract ends |
Goalkeepers
| 1 | Abdul Hadi Hamid | (Malaysia) | 25 February 1987 (age 38) | Youth team | 2006 | |
| 18 | Ifwat Akmal | (Malaysia) | 10 August 1996 (age 29) | Youth team | 2016 | |
| 22 | Asri Muhamad | (Malaysia) | 2 October 1998 (age 27) | Youth team | 2018 | |
| 30 | Ramadhan Hamid | (Malaysia) | 16 February 1994 (age 31) | Kelantan | 2018 | |
Defenders
| 2 | Syawal Nordin | (Malaysia) | 25 March 1993 (age 32) | Harimau Muda | 2015 | |
| 3 | Renan Alves | (Brazil) | 17 December 1992 (age 33) | (Indonesia) Borneo | 2019 | 2021 |
| 5 | Norfiqrie Talib | (Malaysia) | 31 January 1996 (age 30) | Youth team | 2018 | |
| 11 | Shakir Hamzah | (Singapore) | 20 October 1992 (age 33) | (Singapore) Home United | 2019 | 2019 |
| 13 | Khairul Helmi | (Malaysia) | 31 March 1988 (age 37) | Youth team | 2007 | |
| 15 | Rizal Ghazali | (Malaysia) | 1 October 1992 (age 33) | Perlis | 2014 | |
| 17 | Syazwan Tajudin | (Malaysia) | 7 January 1994 (age 32) | Harimau Muda B | 2014 | |
| 24 | Asri Mardzuki | (Malaysia) | 12 May 1994 (age 31) | Youth team | 2018 | |
| 25 | Azmeer Yusof | (Malaysia) | 25 May 1990 (age 35) | Kuala Lumpur | 2019 | |
| 28 | Alif Yusof | (Malaysia) | 19 January 1991 (age 35) | Felda United | 2019 | |
Midfielders
| 4 | Azamuddin Akil | (Malaysia) | 16 April 1985 (age 40) | Selangor | 2019 | |
| 7 | Baddrol Bakhtiar (captain) | (Malaysia) | 1 February 1988 (age 38) | Youth team | 2005 | |
| 16 | Amirul Hisyam | (Malaysia) | 5 May 1995 (age 30) | Harimau Muda B | 2015 | |
| 19 | Syahrul Azwari | (Malaysia) | 12 January 1993 (age 33) | Melaka United | 2019 | |
| 20 | Fadzrul Danel | (Malaysia) | 14 January 1998 (age 28) | Youth team | 2019 | 2021 |
| 21 | Fayadh Zulkifli | (Malaysia) | 14 September 1998 (age 27) | Youth team | 2019 | 2021 |
| 23 | Shahrul Igwan | (Malaysia) | 17 May 1994 (age 31) | Selangor | 2019 | |
| 27 | Hidhir Idris | (Malaysia) | 29 May 1997 (age 28) | Youth team | 2017 | |
| 29 | Farhan Roslan | (Malaysia) | 3 December 1996 (age 29) | Youth team | 2014 | |
| 31 | Zhafir Yusoff | (Malaysia) | 30 April 1999 (age 26) | Youth team | 2019 | |
| 55 | David Rowley | (Australia) | 6 February 1990 (age 35) | Kelantan | 2019 | 2019 |
| 60 | Edgar Bernhardt | (Kyrgyzstan) | 30 March 1986 (age 39) | (Poland) GKS Tychy | 2019 | 2019 |
Forwards
| 8 | Zaquan Adha | (Malaysia) | 3 August 1987 (age 38) | Kuala Lumpur | 2019 | 2019 |
| 9 | Fernando Rodríguez | (Spain) | 11 May 1987 (age 38) | (Indonesia) Mitra Kukar | 2019 | 2019 |
| 10 | Jonatan Bauman | (Argentina) | 30 March 1991 (age 34) | (Indonesia) Persib Bandung | 2019 | 2019 |
| 14 | Thanabalan Nadarajah | (Malaysia) | 25 February 1995 (age 30) | Negeri Sembilan | 2019 | |

== Transfers and contracts ==
=== In ===
| No. | Pos. | Player | From | Date | Fee | Source |
|---|---|---|---|---|---|---|
| 11 | DF | (Singapore) Shakir Hamzah | (Singapore) Home United | 8 November 2018 | Free | |
| 14 | FW | (Malaysia) Thanabalan Nadarajah | (Malaysia) Negeri Sembilan | 22 November 2018 | Free | |
| 19 | MF | (Malaysia) Syahrul Azwari | (Malaysia) Melaka United | 22 November 2018 | Free | |
| 25 | DF | (Malaysia) Azmeer Yusof | (Malaysia) Kuala Lumpur | 22 November 2018 | Free | |
| 23 | MF | (Malaysia) Shahrul Igwan | (Malaysia) Selangor | 22 November 2018 | Free | |
| 6 | MF | (Iraq) Anmar Almubaraki | (Thailand) Army United | 22 November 2018 | Free | |
| 21 | MF | (Malaysia) Fayadh Zulkifli | Youth team | 25 November 2019 | Free | |
| 9 | FW | (Spain) Fernando Rodríguez | (Indonesia) Mitra Kukar | 28 November 2018 | Free | |
| 4 | MF | (Malaysia) Azamuddin Akil | (Malaysia) Selangor | 2 December 2018 | Free | |
| 3 | DF | (Brazil) Renan Alves | (Indonesia) Borneo | 14 December 2018 | Free | |
| 8 | FW | (Malaysia) Zaquan Adha | (Malaysia) Kuala Lumpur | 17 December 2018 | Free | |
| 28 | DF | (Malaysia) Alif Yusof | (Malaysia) Felda United | 5 January 2019 | Free | |
| 10 | FW | (Argentina) Jonatan Bauman | (Indonesia) Persib Bandung | 6 January 2019 | Free | |
| 55 | MF | (Australia) David Rowley | (Malaysia) Kelantan | 23 May 2019 | Undisclosed | |
| 60 | MF | (Kyrgyzstan) Edgar Bernhardt | (Poland) GKS Tychy | 27 May 2019 | Free | |

=== Out ===
| No. | Pos. | Player | To | Date | Fee | Source |
|---|---|---|---|---|---|---|
| 28 | MF | (Malaysia) Zulfahamzie Tarmizi | Released | | | |
| 11 | FW | (Malaysia) Zafuan Azeman | Released | | | |
| 23 | MF | (Malaysia) Hanif Dzahir | Released | | | |
| 30 | MF | (Indonesia) Andik Vermansyah | (Indonesia) Madura United | 3 November 2018 | Free | |
| 22 | MF | (Malaysia) Syazwan Zainon | (Malaysia) Selangor | 8 November 2018 | Free | |
| 27 | MF | (Malaysia) Ariff Farhan | (Malaysia) PKNS | 22 November 2018 | Free | |
| 18 | MF | (Malaysia) Abdul Halim Saari | (Malaysia) Selangor | 22 November 2018 | Free | |
| 14 | MF | (Malaysia) Akram Mahinan | (Malaysia) PKNS | 7 December 2018 | Undisclosed (tribunal fee) | |
| 20 | FW | (Malaysia) Akhyar Rashid | (Malaysia) Johor Darul Ta'zim | 29 December 2018 | MYR285,000 (tribunal fee) | |
| 9 | FW | (Brazil) Paulo Rangel | (Brazil) Paysandu | 1 January 2019 | Free | |
| 8 | MF | (Kosovo) Liridon Krasniqi | (Malaysia) Melaka United | 20 January 2019 | Free | |
| 4 | DF | (Philippines) Álvaro Silva | (Philippines) Ceres–Negros | 29 January 2019 | Free | |
| 10 | MF | (Brazil) Sandro | (Malaysia) Selangor | 21 February 2019 | Free | |
| 6 | MF | (Iraq) Anmar Almubaraki | Released | | | |

=== Loans out ===
| Date from | Date to | Pos. | Name | To | Source |
|---|---|---|---|---|---|
| 22 November 2018 | End of season | GK | (Malaysia) Farhan Abu Bakar | (Malaysia) PKNS | |

=== Extension of contract ===
| Pos. | Player | Source |
|---|---|---|
| GK | (Malaysia) Abdul Hadi Abdul Hamid | |
| GK | (Malaysia) Asri Muhamad | |
| GK | (Malaysia) Ramadhan Hamid | |
| DF | (Malaysia) Rizal Ghazali | |
| DF | (Malaysia) Norfiqrie Talib | |
| DF | (Malaysia) Asri Mardzuki | |
| DF | (Malaysia) Khairul Helmi Johari | |
| DF | (Malaysia) Syazwan Tajudin | |
| MF | (Malaysia) Hidhir Idris | |
| MF | (Malaysia) Baddrol Bakhtiar | |
| FW | (Malaysia) Farhan Roslan | |

== Friendlies ==
=== Pre Friendlies ===
| 13 December 2018 Friendly | Kedah | 1–1 | Penang | Sintok |
| | Baddrol 55' | | Dhiyaulrahman 67' | Stadium: UUM Mini Stadium |

| 17 December 2018 Friendly | Kedah | 2–1 | Kedah Under-21 | Alor Setar |
| | | | | Stadium: Peremba Mini Stadium |

| 21 December 2018 Friendly | Kedah | 1–3 | Perlis | Kangar |
| | Hisyam 45' | | Hafizi 70'; Safee 77'; Nazrin 90' | Stadium: Tuanku Syed Putra Stadium |

| 25 December 2018 Friendly | Kedah | 0–0 | RAJD FC | Kepala Batas |
| | | | | Stadium: SMK Tunku Anum Mini Stadium |

| 9 January 2019 Friendly | Kedah | 4–1 | Kelantan | Sintok |
| 2045hours | Fernando Rodríguez 5', 45'; Zaquan 8'; Alves 18' | | Zazai 49' | Stadium: UUM Mini Stadium |

| 13 January 2019 Unity Shield | Kedah | 2–0 | Perak | Alor Setar |
| 2045hours | Fernando Rodríguez 68'; Syahrul 76' | | | Stadium: Darul Aman Stadium |

| 26 January 2019 Friendly | Kedah | 4–0 | (Singapore) Home United | Alor Setar |
| 2045hours | Bauman 12', 16'; Fernando Rodríguez 32'; Baddrol 50' | | | Stadium: Darul Aman Stadium |

=== Tour of Krabi ===
| 19 January 2018 Friendly | Buriram United (Thailand) | 2–0 | Kedah | Krabi |
| | | | | Stadium: Krabi Provincial Stadium |

| 21 January 2018 Friendly | Trang (Thailand) | 1–3 | Kedah | Krabi |
| | | 45' | Zaquan 44'; Bauman 56', 64' | Stadium: Krabi Provincial Stadium |

| 23 January 2018 Friendly | Surat Thani (Thailand) | 0–3 | Kedah | Krabi |
| | | | Bauman 34'; Fernando Rodríguez 54'; Thanabalan 74' | Stadium: Krabi Provincial Stadium |

=== Mid season Friendlies ===
| 1 June 2019 Friendly | Kedah | 3–1 | Perak U21 | Alor Setar |
| | Baddrol 10'; Fayadh 20'; Shahrul Igwan 82' | | Khairul Amizal 41' | Stadium: Darul Aman Stadium |

| 10 June 2019 Friendly | Kedah | 6–0 | 19RAMD FC | Alor Setar |
| | Bauman 20'; Shahrul Igwan 25'; Fernando 55'; Rowley 57'; Rizal 76'; Hidhir 85' | | | Stadium: Darul Aman Stadium |

== Competitions ==
=== Malaysia Super League ===
==== League table ====
| Pos | Team | Pld | W | D | L | GF | GA | GD | Pts | Qualification or relegation |
|---|---|---|---|---|---|---|---|---|---|---|
| 2 | Pahang | 22 | 12 | 7 | 3 | 37 | 21 | +16 | 43 | |
| 3 | Selangor | 22 | 10 | 7 | 5 | 41 | 35 | +6 | 37 | |
| 4 | Kedah (Note: Kedah FA qualified for the AFC Champions League preliminary round 2 as Malaysia FA Cup winners.) | 22 | 9 | 7 | 6 | 37 | 29 | +8 | 34 | Qualification for AFC Champions League preliminary round 2 |
| 5 | Perak | 22 | 8 | 9 | 5 | 36 | 31 | +5 | 33 | |
| 6 | Melaka United | 22 | 9 | 6 | 7 | 34 | 30 | +4 | 33 | |

Source: MFL
Rules for classification: 1) Points; 2) Goal difference; 3) Number of goals scored.

==== Results by matchday ====
| Matchday | 1 | 2 | 3 | 4 | 5 | 6 | 7 | 8 | 9 | 10 | 11 | 12 | 13 | 14 | 15 | 16 | 17 | 18 | 19 | 20 | 21 | 22 |
|---|---|---|---|---|---|---|---|---|---|---|---|---|---|---|---|---|---|---|---|---|---|---|
| Ground | A | A | H | A | H | A | H | A | H | A | H | H | A | H | A | H | A | H | H | A | H | A |
| Result | W | D | W | W | D | L | D | L | W | L | D | W | L | W | L | D | W | W | D | D | D | L |
| Position | 2 | 4 | 1 | 1 | 3 | 3 | 3 | 3 | 3 | 4 | 4 | 3 | 4 | 3 | 3 | 4 | 3 | 3 | 4 | 4 | 3 | 4 |

Updated to match(es) played on 21 July 2019. Source: MFL
A = Away; H = Home; W = Win; D = Draw; L = Loss

==== Fixtures and results ====
| 2 February 2019 1 | PKNP | 0–2 | Kedah | Manjung |
| 21:00 UTC+8 | Ezanie (yellow card) 27'; Hafiz (yellow card) 65'; Hafiz (yellow card) 80'; Asrorov (yellow card) 82' | Report | Shakir 66'; Alif (yellow card) 75'; Bauman 82' | Stadium: Manjung Municipal Council Stadium; Referee: Razlan Joffri Ali |

| 10 February 2019 2 | Perak | 1–1 | Kedah | Ipoh |
| 21:00 UTC+8 | Gan 18'; Leandro (yellow card) 20'; Anderson (yellow card) 60'; Khairil (yellow card) 80' | Report | Bauman (yellow card) 15'; Renan 21'; Shakir (yellow card) 45'; Rizal (yellow card) 78' | Stadium: Perak Stadium; Referee: Hamdan Awang |

| 16 February 2019 3 | Kedah | 4–0 | Felda United | Alor Setar |
| 21:00 UTC+8 | Zaquan 17'; Almubaraki 42'; Shakir 54'; Danel 74' | Report | Haziq (yellow card) 72' | Stadium: Darul Aman Stadium; Referee: Mohd Hasrol Mohd Amir |

| 22 February 2019 4 | Petaling Jaya City | 0–2 | Kedah | Petaling Jaya |
| 21:00 UTC+8 | Bae Beom-geun (yellow card) 33'; Elizeu (yellow card) 45'; Tinagaran (yellow card) 62' | Report | Syahrul 7'; Fernando 41'; Zaquan (yellow card) 67'; Hidhir (yellow card) 79' | Stadium: Petaling Jaya Stadium; Referee: Wan Mohamad Tarmizi |

| 2 March 2019 5 | Kedah | 0–0 | PKNS | Alor Setar |
| 21:00 UTC+8 | Rizal (yellow card) 29'; Renan (red card) 87'; Baddrol (yellow card) 90+1' | Report | Faizat (yellow card) 17'; Swirad (yellow card) 35'; Vathanaka (yellow card) 44'; Rodney (yellow card) 56'; Guerra (yellow card) 72'; Kozubaev (yellow card) 76' | Stadium: Darul Aman Stadium; Referee: Mohd Amirul Izwan Yaacob |

| 8 March 2019 6 | Pahang | 1–0 | Kedah | Kuantan |
| 21:00 UTC+8 | Davies (yellow card) 18'; Nwakaeme (yellow card) 53'; Zuhair 86' | Report | Baddrol (yellow card) 6'; Fernando (yellow card) 29'; Bauman (yellow card) 40'; Helmi (yellow card) 73'; Alif (yellow card) 83' | Stadium: Darul Makmur Stadium; Referee: Zamzaidi Katimin |

| 29 March 2019 7 | Kedah | 1–1 | Johor Darul Ta'zim | Alor Setar |
| 21:00 UTC+8 | Amirul (yellow card) 10'; Rizal (yellow card) 15'; Fernando 32'; Azmeer (yellow card) 54' | Report | Safawi 10'; Corbin-Ong (yellow card) 29'; Farizal (yellow card) 58' | Stadium: Darul Aman Stadium; Referee: Mohd Fairuzi Mat Desa |

| 6 April 2019 8 | Kuala Lumpur | 2–1 | Kedah | Kuala Lumpur |
| 21:00 UTC+8 | Woodland 10' de Paula 50'; Indra Putra (yellow card) 80'; Fitri (yellow card) 83'; Paulo Josué (yellow card) 86'; Zhafri (yellow card) 90' | Report | Fernando 32'; Azmeer (yellow card) 48' | Stadium: Kuala Lumpur Stadium; Referee: Adam Fazeel |

| 12 April 2019 9 | Kedah | 3–0 | Terengganu | Alor Setar |
| 21:00 UTC+8 | Bauman 24' (pen.); Zaquan 32'; Fernando 72'; Renan (yellow card) 84' | Report | Nasrullah (yellow card) 25' | Stadium: Darul Aman Stadium; Referee: Zamzaidi Katimin |

| 21 April 2019 10 | Melaka United | 1–0 | Kedah | Krubong |
| 21:00 UTC+8 | Saiful (yellow card) 41'; Casagrande 49'; Fahmi (yellow card) 90+1' | Report | Farhan (yellow card) 56'; Shakir (yellow card) 66' | Stadium: Hang Jebat Stadium; Referee: Mohd Nafeez Abdul Wahab |

| 26 April 2019 11 | Kedah | 1–1 | Selangor | Alor Setar |
| 21:00 UTC+8 | Baddrol 42'; Renan (yellow card) 57'; Amirul (yellow card) 75' | Report | Sandro 18'; Regan (yellow card) 26'; Sean (yellow card) 44'; Azreen (yellow card) 72' | Stadium: Darul Aman Stadium; Referee: Nazmi Nasaruddin |

| 3 May 2019 12 | Kedah | 5–2 | Kuala Lumpur | Alor Setar |
| 21:00 UTC+8 | Bauman 22', 90'; Shakir 42'; Renan (yellow card) 58'; Fernando 67', 81' | Report | Irfan (yellow card) 22'; Sharbinee (yellow card) 35'; Indra Putra 45', (yellow card) 88' de Paula 78'; Alif (yellow card) 90+2' | Stadium: Darul Aman Stadium; Referee: Mohd Hasrol Mohd Amir |

| 15 May 2019 13 | Selangor | 3–1 | Kedah | Shah Alam |
| 22:00 UTC+8 | Ifedayo 35', 44', 57'; Nguyễn (yellow card) 42'; Namathevan (yellow card) 63' | Report | Amirul (yellow card) 35'; Rizal (yellow card) 40'; Bauman 65' | Stadium: Shah Alam Stadium; Referee: Mohd Nafeez Abdul Wahab |

| 18 May 2019 14 | Kedah | 2–1 | Melaka United | Alor Setar |
| 22:00 UTC+8 | Farhan (yellow card) 31'; Baddrol 61', (yellow card) 74'; Jang Suk-won 71' (o.g.) | Report | Milunović 31'; Shukor (yellow card) 45+2'; Khuzaimi (yellow card) 60'; Saiful (yellow card) 85' | Stadium: Darul Aman Stadium; Referee: Suhaimi Mat Hassan |

| 26 May 2019 15 | Johor Darul Ta'zim | 2–0 | Kedah | Johor |
| 22:00 UTC+8 | Velázquez 33'; Safawi 87', (yellow card) 87' | Report | Bauman (yellow card) 1'; Rizal (yellow card) 39' (yellow-red card) 67'; Renan (yellow card) 46'; Azmeer (yellow card) 51'; Zaquan (yellow card) 55' | Stadium: Tan Sri Dato' Haji Hassan Yunos Stadium; Referee: Nazmi Nasaruddin |

| 14 June 2019 16 | Kedah | 0–0 | Pahang | Alor Setar |
| 21:00 UTC+8 | Renan (yellow card) 30'; Baddrol (yellow card) 62' | Report | | Stadium: Darul Aman Stadium; Referee: Mohd Fairuzi Mat Desa |

| 18 June 2019 17 | PKNS | 2–3 | Kedah | Shah Alam |
| 21:00 UTC+8 | Akram (yellow card) 5'; Sherman 53' (pen.) | Report | Baddrol 10'; Fayadh 71'; Rizal 90+1' | Stadium: Shah Alam Stadium; Referee: Zamzaidi Katimin |

| 26 June 2019 18 | Kedah | 3–2 | Petaling Jaya City | Alor Setar |
| 21:00 UTC+8 | Baddrol 15'; Farhan 49', (yellow card) 90+3'; Shakir (yellow card) 57'; Fernando 76'; Alif (yellow card) 87' | Report | Washington Brandão 60'; Ganiesh 66'; Thivandaran (yellow card) 90+4' | Stadium: Darul Aman Stadium; Referee: Suhaimi Mat Hassan |

| 5 July 2019 19 | Kedah | 1–1 | PKNP | Alor Setar |
| 21:00 UTC+8 | Rizal (yellow card) 36'; Azamuddin 52' | Report | Pedro Victor (yellow card) 55'; Hafiz (yellow card) 63'; Giancarlo 81' | Stadium: Darul Aman Stadium; Referee: Mohd Hasrol Mohd Amir |

| 9 July 2019 20 | Terengganu | 2–2 | Kedah | Kuala Terengganu |
| 21:00 UTC+8 | Shaakhmedov 33'; Amirzafran (yellow card) 45+3'; Tuck (yellow card) 57'; Tchétché 90+3' | Report | Shakir 5'; Azmeer (yellow card) 45+1' (yellow-red card) 68'; Baddrol 45+4'; Shakir (yellow card) 86' | Stadium: Sultan Ismail Nasiruddin Shah Stadium; Referee: Wan Mohamad Tarmizi |

| 13 July 2019 21 | Kedah | 4–2 | Perak | Alor Setar |
| 21:00 UTC+8 | Thanabalan 40', (yellow card) 59'; Renan 45'; Alif (yellow card) 49'; Baddrol (yellow card) 51'; Shakir (yellow card) 79'; Fernando 89', 90+4' | Report | Shahrul 29'; Firdaus (yellow card) 33'; Careca (yellow card) 49'; Ronaldo 79' (pen.) | Stadium: Darul Aman Stadium; Referee: Razlan Joffri Ali |

| 21 July 2019 22 | Felda United | 5–1 | Kedah | Jengka |
| 21:00 UTC+8 | Jocinei 6'; Jadid (yellow card) 21'; Faiz 32'; Jasazrin (yellow card) 45+2', (goal) 90+2'; Khairul Amri 85', (yellow card) 85'; Thiago Junio (yellow card) 86'; Ikeda 90+3' | Report | Farhan (yellow card) 11'; Renan (yellow card) 36' (yellow-red card) 74'; Bauman 78' (pen.) | Stadium: Tun Abdul Razak Stadium; Referee: S. Logeswaran |

=== Malaysia FA Cup ===
| 3 April 2019 Second round | Kedah | 3–2 (a.e.t.) | Selangor United | Alor Setar |
| 21:00 UTC+8 | Bauman 53'; Zaquan 68'; Fernando (yellow card) 70', (goal) 112'; Ramadhan (yellow card) 74'; Alif (yellow card) 90'; Shakir (yellow card) 120' | Report | Norhafizzuan 9'; Fauzan (yellow card) 19'; Aikal (yellow card) 34'; Ezequiel Agüero 48'; Franklin (yellow card) 70'; Nazrul (yellow card) 82' | Stadium: Darul Aman Stadium; Referee: Zulkarnain Zakaria |

| 16 April 2019 Third round | Kedah | 2–0 | Petaling Jaya City | Alor Setar |
| 21:00 UTC+8 | Renan 3', (yellow card) 3'; Azmeer (yellow card) 30'; Zaquan 55'; Bauman (yellow card) 82' | Report | | Stadium: Darul Aman Stadium; Referee: Wan Mohamad Tarmizi |

| 30 April 2019 Quarter-finals first leg | PKNS | 1–3 | Kedah | Selangor |
| 21:00 UTC+8 | Kozubaev (red card) 32'; Morales (yellow card) 58'; Guerra 64'; Rodney (yellow card) 88' | Report | Fernando 13'; Bauman 26' (pen.), 45+1'; Alif (yellow card) 58'; Zaquan (yellow card) 81'; Renan (yellow card) 84' | Stadium: Shah Alam Stadium; Referee: Zamzaidi Katimin |

| 10 May 2019 Quarter-finals second leg | Kedah | 1–1 (4–2 agg.) | PKNS | Alor Setar |
| 22:00 UTC+8 | Farhan (yellow card) 10'; Bauman 17'; Baddrol (yellow card) 53'; Rizal (yellow card) 70' | Report | Azmeer 32' (o.g.); Rodney (yellow card) 77' | Stadium: Darul Aman Stadium; Referee: Mohd Fairuzi Mat Desa |

Kedah won 4−2 on aggregate.

| 22 June 2019 Semi-finals first leg | Kedah | 1–0 | Felda United | Alor Setar |
| 21:00 UTC+8 | Fernando 70' (pen.) | Report | Zahril (yellow card) 41'; Norazlan (yellow card) 51'; Jasazrin (yellow card) 84' | Stadium: Darul Aman Stadium; Referee: Suhaimi Mat Hassan |

| 30 June 2019 Semi-finals second leg | Felda United | 3–2 (3–3 agg.) | Kedah | Jengka |
| 21:00 UTC+8 | Thiago Junio 65'; Chanturu 72'; Hadin 90+4' | Report | Fernando 26' (pen.); Farhan 38'; Rowley (yellow card) 72' | Stadium: Tun Abdul Razak Stadium; Referee: Zamzaidi Katimin |

Kedah won 3–3 on away goal rule.

| 27 July 2019 Final | Perak | 0–1 (a.e.t.) | Kedah | Bukit Jalil |
| 21:00 UTC+8 | Nazirul (yellow card) 14'; Leandro (yellow card) 27'; Amirul (red card) 90+4' | Report | Baddrol (yellow card) 13'; Bauman (yellow card) 60'; Danel 105+1' | Stadium: Bukit Jalil National Stadium; Referee: Takuto Okabe |

=== Malaysia Cup ===
==== Group stage ====
| Pos | Team | Pld | W | D | L | GF | GA | GD | Pts | Qualification | KED | TER | NSE | PKNS |
|---|---|---|---|---|---|---|---|---|---|---|---|---|---|---|
| 1 | Kedah | 6 | 4 | 1 | 1 | 14 | 10 | +4 | 13 | Advance to knockout stage | — | 0–2 | 4–2 | 3–2 |
| 2 | Terengganu | 6 | 4 | 0 | 2 | 14 | 8 | +6 | 12 | Advance to knockout stage | 2–3 | — | 3–1 | 3–1 |
| 3 | Negeri Sembilan | 6 | 2 | 0 | 4 | 11 | 15 | −4 | 6 | | 1–3 | 3–2 | — | 1–2 |
| 4 | PKNS | 6 | 1 | 1 | 4 | 7 | 13 | −6 | 4 | | 1–1 | 0–2 | 1–3 | — |

Source: FAM MFL

| 3 August 2019 1 | Negeri Sembilan | 1–3 | Kedah | Paroi |
| 21:00 UTC+8 | Hadri (yellow card) 19'; Ferris (yellow card) 70', (goal) 78'; Almir (yellow card) 90+1' | Report | Fernando Rodríguez 4'; Alif (yellow card) 17'; Renan (yellow card) 71'; Shakir 72'; Bauman 83' (pen.); Farhan (yellow card) 87' | Stadium: Tuanku Abdul Rahman Stadium; Referee: Zamzaidi Katimin |

| 8 August 2019 2 | Kedah | 0–2 | Terengganu | Alor Setar |
| 21:00 UTC+8 | Renan (yellow card) 42'; Shakir (yellow card) 65' | Report | Ilham (red card) 45+2'; Tchétché 66', 87' | Stadium: Darul Aman Stadium; Referee: Mohd Fairuzi Mat Desa |

| 16 August 2019 3 | PKNS | 1-1 | Kedah | Shah Alam |
| 21:00 UTC+8 | Romel Morales 70' | Report | Fernando Rodríguez 21' | Stadium: Shah Alam Stadium; Referee: Zamzaidi Katimin |

| 20 August 2019 4 | Kedah | 3–2 | PKNS | Alor Setar |
| 21:00 UTC+8 | Jonatan Bauman 51,84'; Alif Yusof 90+1' | Report | Romel Morales 30'; Nicholas Swirad 71' | Stadium: Darul Aman Stadium; Referee: Zulkarnain Zakaria |

| 13 September 2019 5 | Terengganu | 2-3 | Kedah | Kuala Terengganu |
| 21:00 UTC+8 | Lee Tuck (pen.); Malik Ariff | Report | Jonatan Bauman 5'; Edgar Bernhardt 37'; Baddrol Bakhtiar 87' | Stadium: Sultan Ismail Nasiruddin Shah Stadium; Referee: Zulkifli Ahmad |

| 17 September 2019 6 | Kedah | 4-2 | Negeri Sembilan | Alor Setar |
| 21:00 UTC+8 | Farhan Roslan 18'; Fernando Rodríguez 45'; Fayadh Zulkifli 78'; Edgar Bernhardt 90' (pen.) | Report | Igor Luiz 34'; Ferris Danial Mat Nasir 66' | Stadium: Darul Aman Stadium; Referee: Zamzaidi Katimin |

==== Quarter-final ====
| 25 September 2019 Leg 1 | PKNP | 1-2 | Kedah | Manjung |
| 21:00 UTC+8 | Yashir Islame 38' | Report | Fernando Rodríguez 50'; David Rowley 74' | Stadium: Manjung Municipal Council Stadium |

| 29 September 2019 Leg 2 | Kedah | 4-1 | PKNP | Alor Setar |
| 21:00 UTC+8 | Farhan Roslan 24'; Jonatan Bauman 25'; David Rowley 72'; Fayadh Zulkifli 90' | Report | Mukhairi Ajmal 80' | Stadium: Darul Aman Stadium; Referee: Zamzaidi Katimin |

Kedah won 6−2 on aggregate.

==== Semi-final ====
| 19 October 2019 Leg 1 | Kedah | 3-3 | Pahang | Alor Setar |
| 21:00 UTC+8 | Bauman 37' (pen.); Rodríguez 40'; Zaquan 90+4' | Report | Wan 14'; Nwakaeme 26' (pen.); Azam 73' | Stadium: Darul Aman Stadium; Referee: Zamzaidi Katimin |

| 26 October 2019 Leg 2 | Pahang | 5-5 | Kedah | Kuantan |
| 21:00 UTC+8 | Dickson Nwakaeme 33', 120+2'; Lazarus Kaimbi 71', 75'; Hérold Goulon 112' (pen.) | Report | Fernando Rodríguez (Spanish footballer) 8', 117'; Jonatan Bauman 55'; Renan da Silva Alves 93'; Baddrol Bakhtiar 85' | Stadium: Darul Makmur Stadium; Referee: Suhaimi Mat Hassan |

==== Final ====
| 2 November 2019 | Kedah | 0–3 | Johor Darul Ta'zim | Bukit Jalil National Stadium, Bukit Jalil |
| 21:00 UTC+8 | Adha (yellow card) 9'; Bauman (yellow card) 14'; Shakir (yellow card) 21' | Report | Leandro 27'; Maurício (yellow card) 31'; Safawi 35'; Aidil (yellow card) 45+2'; Syafiq 58' | Attendance: 85,000; Referee: Muhammad Nazmi Nasaruddin |

== Statistics ==
=== Appearances and goals ===
| No. | Pos. | Name | League | | FA Cup | | Malaysia Cup | | Total | | Discipline | |
| No. | Pos. | Name | Apps | Goals | Apps | Goals | Apps | Goals | Apps | Goals | Yellow card | Red card |
|---|---|---|---|---|---|---|---|---|---|---|---|---|
| 1 | GK | (Malaysia) Abdul Hadi Hamid | 3(1) | 0 | 0 | 0 | 2 | 0 | 6 | 0 | 6 | 0 |
| 2 | DF | (Malaysia) Syawal Nordin | 0 | 0 | 0 | 0 | 0 | 0 | 0 | 0 | 0 | 0 |
| 3 | DF | (Brazil) Renan Alves | 19 | 2 | 5 | 1 | 9 | 1 | 33 | 4 | 14 | 2 |
| 4 | MF | (Malaysia) Azamuddin Akil | 2(2) | 1 | 0(3) | 0 | 3(4) | 0 | 14 | 1 | 0 | 0 |
| 5 | DF | (Malaysia) Norfiqrie Talib | 3(2) | 0 | 0 | 0 | 0(1) | 0 | 6 | 0 | 0 | 0 |
| 7 | MF | (Malaysia) Baddrol Bakhtiar | 21 | 5 | 7 | 0 | 11 | 2 | 39 | 7 | 9 | 0 |
| 8 | FW | (Malaysia) Zaquan Adha | 14(7) | 2 | 6 | 2 | 3(5) | 1 | 35 | 5 | 4 | 0 |
| 9 | FW | (Spain) Fernando Rodríguez | 22 | 9 | 7 | 4 | 9(1) | 8 | 39 | 21 | 2 | 0 |
| 10 | MF | (Argentina) Jonatan Bauman | 17(1) | 6 | 5(2) | 4 | 11 | 6 | 36 | 16 | 7 | 0 |
| 11 | DF | (Singapore) Shakir Hamzah | 20 | 4 | 7 | 0 | 10 | 1 | 37 | 5 | 10 | 0 |
| 13 | DF | (Malaysia) Khairul Helmi | 4(2) | 0 | 2(1) | 0 | 2(1) | 0 | 12 | 0 | 1 | 0 |
| 14 | FW | (Malaysia) Thanabalan Nadarajah | 2(10) | 1 | 0(3) | 0 | 0(2) | 0 | 17 | 1 | 1 | 0 |
| 15 | DF | (Malaysia) Rizal Ghazali | 18 | 1 | 6(1) | 0 | 10 | 0 | 35 | 1 | 10 | 1 |
| 16 | MF | (Malaysia) Amirul Hisyam | 7(3) | 0 | 4(1) | 0 | 2 | 0 | 17 | 0 | 3 | 0 |
| 17 | DF | (Malaysia) Syazwan Tajudin | 0(1) | 0 | 1 | 0 | 0 | 0 | 2 | 0 | 0 | 0 |
| 18 | GK | (Malaysia) Ifwat Akmal | 18 | 0 | 6 | 0 | 9 | 0 | 33 | 0 | 0 | 0 |
| 19 | MF | (Malaysia) Syahrul Azwari | 2(6) | 1 | 0 | 0 | 0 | 0 | 8 | 1 | 0 | 0 |
| 20 | MF | (Malaysia) Fadzrul Danel | 14(3) | 1 | 0(4) | 1 | 4(5) | 0 | 30 | 2 | 0 | 0 |
| 21 | MF | (Malaysia) Fayadh Zulkifli | 1(12) | 1 | 0(4) | 0 | 0(11) | 2 | 28 | 3 | 0 | 0 |
| 22 | GK | (Malaysia) Asri Muhamad | 0 | 0 | 0 | 0 | 0 | 0 | 0 | 0 | 0 | 0 |
| 23 | MF | (Malaysia) Shahrul Igwan | 0 | 0 | 0 | 0 | 0 | 0 | 0 | 0 | 0 | 0 |
| 24 | DF | (Malaysia) Asri Mardzuki | 0 | 0 | 0 | 0 | 0 | 0 | 0 | 0 | 0 | 0 |
| 25 | DF | (Malaysia) Azmeer Yusof | 12(1) | 0 | 4 | 0 | 7 | 0 | 24 | 0 | 7 | 1 |
| 27 | MF | (Malaysia) Hidhir Idris | 4(8) | 0 | 1 | 0 | 0(1) | 0 | 14 | 0 | 1 | 0 |
| 28 | DF | (Malaysia) Alif Yusof | 10(1) | 0 | 3(1) | 0 | 4 | 1 | 19 | 1 | 7 | 0 |
| 29 | MF | (Malaysia) Farhan Roslan | 12(2) | 1 | 6 | 1 | 9(1) | 2 | 30 | 4 | 7 | 0 |
| 30 | GK | (Malaysia) Ramadhan Hamid | 1 | 0 | 1 | 0 | 0 | 0 | 2 | 0 | 1 | 0 |
| 31 | MF | (Malaysia) Zhafir Yusoff | 0(1) | 0 | 0 | 0 | 0 | 0 | 1 | 0 | 0 | 0 |
| 33 | DF | (Malaysia) Loqman Hakim | 1 | 0 | 0 | 0 | 0 | 0 | 1 | 0 | 0 | 0 |
| 55 | MF | (Australia) David Rowley | 3(2) | 0 | 2(1) | 0 | 6(1) | 2 | 15 | 2 | 2 | 0 |
| 60 | MF | (Kyrgyzstan) Edgar Bernhardt | 7 | 0 | 3 | 0 | 10 | 2 | 20 | 2 | 0 | 0 |
Players who have played this season and/or sign for the season but had left the club or on loan to other club
| 6 | MF | (Iraq) Anmar Almubaraki | 5(1) | 1 | 1 | 0 | 0 | 0 | 7 | 1 | 0 | 0 |

Statistics accurate as of 17 December 2019.
