= 2019 PDRM FA season =

PDRM
2019 season
- President: Noor Rashid Ibrahim
- Manager: Kamarul Ariffin
- Head coach: Fauzi Pilus (until 23 February 2019); E. Elavarasan (from 12 March 2019)
- Stadium: Selayang Municipal Council Stadium; Hang Jebat Stadium
- Malaysia Premier League: 3rd (promoted)
- Malaysia FA Cup: Round 3
- Malaysia Cup: To be determined
- Top goalscorer: League: Lee Chang-hoon (11 goals); All: Lee Chang-hoon (13 goals)

The 2019 season was PDRM's 3rd season in the Malaysia Premier League since being relegated from the Malaysia Super League in 2016.

== Malaysia Premier League ==
=== Matches ===
The Malaysian Football League (MFL) announced the fixtures for the 2019 season on 22 December 2018.

Date	Opponents	H / A	Result F–A	Scorers	League position
1 February 2019	UiTM	H	1–3	Lee 90+3' (pen.)	12th
9 February 2019	Negeri Sembilan	H	1–1	Lee 45+4' (pen.)	11th
16 February 2019	Penang	A	0–1		12th
23 February 2019	Selangor United	H	0–1		11th
2 March 2019	Sabah	A	1–3	Redžović 53'	11th
9 March 2019	UKM	H	0–1		11th
5 April 2019	Johor Darul Ta'zim II	H	1–1	Fauzan 86'	11th
12 April 2019	PDRM	A	1–0		11th
20 April 2019	Terengganu II	H	1–1	Wleh 53'	10th
27 April 2019	Sarawak	A	1–0	Lee 51' (pen.)	8th
3 May 2019	Johor Darul Ta'zim II	A	1–0	Lee 76'	7th
11 May 2019	Sarawak	H	6–2	Shahurain (2) 12', 41' (pen.), Lee 27', Andrezinho 29', Gopinathan (2) 73', 90+2'	6th
17 May 2019	Terengganu II	A	0–1		6th
15 June 2019	UKM	A	3–2	Fauzan 8', Redžović 49', Lee 77' (pen.)	7th
19 June 2019	Sabah	H	1–2	Lee 33'	7th
25 June 2019	Selangor United	A	3–2	Agba (2) 2', 56', Ezrie 24',	7th
6 July 2019	UiTM	A	2–1	Agba (2) 44', 52'	7th
10 July 2019	Kelantan	H	3–1	Agba (2) 51', 90+4', Fakrul 57'	5th
13 July 2019	Negeri Sembilan	A	3–2	Agba 36', Lee (2) 85', 90+5'	3rd
20 July 2019	Penang	H	1–2	Wleh 29'	4th

=== League table ===
Pos	Team	Pld	W	D	L	GF	GA	GD	Pts	Qualification or relegation
1	Sabah (C, P)	20	13	4	3	33	17	+16	43	Promotion to Super League and Qualification for the Malaysia Cup group stage
2	Johor Darul Ta'zim II (Note: Johor Darul Ta'zim II and Terengganu II cannot be promoted from Premier League and play for Malaysia Cup as Johor Darul Ta'zim F.C. and Terengganu F.C. (their parent clubs) remain in Super League and play for Malaysia Cup. Should Johor Darul Ta'zim and Terengganu be relegated to Premier League or will not play for Malaysia Cup, Johor Darul Ta'zim II and Terengganu II will have to drop to M3 League or will play for Malaysia Cup.)	20	9	6	5	31	19	+12	33	
3	PDRM (P)	20	9	3	8	30	27	+3	30	Promotion to Super League and Qualification for the Malaysia Cup group stage
4	Terengganu II	20	8	6	6	21	24	−3	30	
5	UiTM (Note: UiTM F.C. is promoted to replaced PKNS F.C. relegated after withdrawing license to complete for the 2020 Malaysia Premier League season as they become feeder club to Selangor FA.) (P)	20	8	5	7	33	25	+8	29	Promotion to Super League and Qualification for the Malaysia Cup group stage

Source: MFL
Rules for classification: 1) Points; 2) Goal difference; 3) Number of goals scored.
(C) Champions; (P) Promoted

== Malaysia FA Cup ==
Date	Round	Opponents	H / A	Result F–A	Scorers
3 April 2019	Round 2	Sarawak	H	5–2	Fauzan 47', Wleh (3) 51', 65', 81', Lee 59' (pen.)
17 April 2019	Round 3	PKNP	A	2–3	Wleh 23', Fauzan 47'

== Malaysia Cup ==
=== Group stage ===
Date	Opponents	H / A	Result F–A	Scorers	Group position
4 August 2019	Melaka United	A	1–3	Lee Chang-hoon 8'	4th

Pos	Team	Pld	W	D	L	GF	GA	GD	Pts	Qualification	SEL	MEL	FEL	PDRM
1	Selangor	6	2	4	0	9	6	+3	10	Advance to knockout stage	—	1–1	2–2	1–1
2	Melaka United	6	2	2	2	10	9	+1	8	Advance to knockout stage	0–1	—	1–3	3–1
3	FELDA United	6	2	1	3	10	12	−2	7		0–2	1–3	—	1–0
4	PDRM	6	1	3	2	10	12	−2	6		2–2	2–2	4–3	—

Source: FAM MFL

== Squad statistics ==
=== Appearances and goals ===
As of match played 4 August 2019

No.	Pos	Nat	Player	Total		Malaysia Premier League		Malaysia FA Cup		Challenge Cup	
No.	Pos	Nat	Player	Apps	Goals	Apps	Goals	Apps	Goals	Apps	Goals
3	DF	(Malaysia) MAS	Hazwan Rahman	6	0	4+2	0	0	0	0	0
4	FW	(Liberia) LBR	Patrick Ronaldinho	20	6	15+2	2	2	4	1	0
5	DF	(Malaysia) MAS	Fauzan Fauzi	19	4	16	2	2	2	1	0
9	FW	(Malaysia) MAS	Shahurain Abu Samah (c)	21	2	14+4	2	2	0	1	0
10	MF	(Malaysia) MAS	Christopher Keli	4	0	0+3	0	0	0	0+1	0
11	FW	(Malaysia) MAS	Khairul Izuan	7	0	5+2	0	0	0	0	0
12	FW	(Malaysia) MAS	Jasper Daring	0	0	0	0	0	0	0	0
14	DF	(Malaysia) MAS	Raja Shahrulnizam	4	0	0+3	0	0+1	0	0	0
15	FW	(South Korea) KOR	Lee Chang-hoon	23	13	20	11	2	1	1	1
17	MF	(Malaysia) MAS	Stuart Wark	10	0	6+3	0	0	0	1	0
18	GK	(Malaysia) MAS	Willfred Jabun	5	0	5	0	0	0	0	0
19	DF	(Malaysia) MAS	Amir Saiful	15	0	12	0	1+1	0	1	0
20	FW	(Malaysia) MAS	Farhan Muhammad	16	0	5+8	0	0+2	0	0+1	0
21	DF	(Malaysia) MAS	Fazli Azrin	2	0	1+1	0	0	0	0	0
23	MF	(Malaysia) MAS	Ezrie Shafizie	13	1	8+3	1	1	0	1	0
24	MF	(Malaysia) MAS	Gopinathan Ramachandra	9	2	7+2	2	0	0	0	0
26	MF	(Montenegro) MNE	Argzim Redžović	23	2	20	2	2	0	1	0
27	DF	(Malaysia) MAS	Eskandar Ismail	13	0	6+6	0	1	0	0	0
28	FW	(Nigeria) NGA	Uche Agba	7	7	7	7	0	0	0	0
30	MF	(Malaysia) MAS	Fakrul Aiman	22	1	8+11	1	1+1	0	1	0
32	MF	(Malaysia) MAS	Safiee Ahmad	18	0	12+3	0	2	0	0+1	0
33	GK	(Malaysia) MAS	Shahril Saa'ri	17	0	15	0	2	0	0	0
34	MF	(Malaysia) MAS	Shukor Azmi	6	0	3+1	0	1+1	0	0	0
37	DF	(Malaysia) MAS	Azmizi Azmi	16	0	13	0	2	0	1	0
52	GK	(Malaysia) MAS	Bryan See Tian Keat	1	0	0	0	0	0	1	0
55	DF	(Malaysia) MAS	Farid Ramli	3	0	3	0	0	0	0	0
Players who appeared for PDRM no longer at the club:
5	MF	(Montenegro) MNE	Benjamin Rexhoviq	1	0	1	0	0	0	0	0
7	FW	(Malaysia) MAS	Arif Mat Asin	3	0	0+3	0	0	0	0	0
13	MF	(Malaysia) MAS	Fauzi Majid	2	0	1+1	0	0	0	0	0
17	DF	(Malaysia) MAS	Syazwan Azizan	0	0	0	0	0	0	0	0
22	GK	(Malaysia) MAS	Farzly Muhammad	0	0	0	0	0	0	0	0
28	MF	(Brazil) BRA	Andrezinho	14	1	13	1	1	0	0	0

== Transfers ==
=== In ===
1st leg

Date	Pos.	Name	From	Fee	Ref.
1 January 2019	DF	(Malaysia) Fauzan Fauzi	(Malaysia) Negeri Sembilan	Undisclosed	
1 January 2019	FW	(South Korea) Lee Chang-hoon	(Malaysia) Melaka United	Undisclosed	
1 January 2019	FW	(Malaysia) Farhan Muhammad	(Malaysia) D'AR Wanderers	Undisclosed	
1 January 2019	MF	(Malaysia) Ezrie Shafizie	(Malaysia) MOF	Undisclosed	
1 January 2019	MF	(Malaysia) Syahid Zaidon	(Malaysia) Negeri Sembilan	Undisclosed	
1 January 2019	MF	(Brazil) Andrezinho	(Malaysia) Marcerra Kuantan	Undisclosed	
1 January 2019	MF	(Malaysia) Fakrul Aiman	(Malaysia) Negeri Sembilan	Undisclosed	
20 February 2019	FW	(Liberia) Patrick Ronaldinho	(Malta) Floriana	Undisclosed	
25 March 2019	GK	(Malaysia) Shahril Saa'ri	(Malaysia) Perlis	Free	
25 March 2019	DF	(Malaysia) Azmizi Azmi	(Malaysia) Perlis	Free	
25 March 2019	MF	(Malaysia) Shukor Azmi	(Malaysia) Perlis	Free	

2nd leg

Date	Pos.	Name	From	Fee	Ref.
8 May 2019	MF	(Malaysia) Stuart Wark	(Malaysia) Penang	Undisclosed	
8 May 2019	MF	(Malaysia) Gopinathan Ramachandra	(Malaysia) Melaka United	Undisclosed	
8 May 2019	DF	(Malaysia) Farid Ramli	(Malaysia) Kuala Lumpur	Undisclosed	
25 May 2019	FW	(Nigeria) Uche Agba	(Bahrain) Al Hidd	Undisclosed	
1 July 2019	GK	(Malaysia) Bryan See Tian Keat	(Thailand) Bangkok	Free	

=== Out ===
1st leg

Date	Pos.	Name	To	Fee	Ref.
31 December 2018	MF	(Japan) Shunsuke Nakatake	(Malaysia) Negeri Sembilan	Undisclosed	
1 March 2019	MF	(Malaysia) Fauzi Abdul Majid	(Malaysia) Ultimate	Undisclosed	

2nd leg

Date	Pos.	Name	To	Fee	Ref.
25 May 2019	MF	(Brazil) Andrezinho	Released		
25 May 2019	FW	(Malaysia) Arif Mat Asin	(Malaysia) Ultimate	Undisclosed	
25 May 2019	GK	(Malaysia) Farzly Muhammad	(Malaysia) Ultimate	Undisclosed	
1 June 2019	MF	(Malaysia) Syahid Zaidon	Released		
1 June 2019	DF	(Malaysia) Syazwan Azizan	(Malaysia) Ultimate	Undisclosed	
