= 2021 Piala Sumbangsih =

Johor Darul Ta'zim	Kedah Darul Aman
2	0
- Date: 5 March 2021
- Venue: Sultan Ibrahim Stadium, Iskandar Puteri
- Man of the Match: Safawi Rasid
- Referee: Nazmi Nasaruddin
- Attendance: 0 (Note: Played without spectators due to the COVID-19 pandemic.)

The 2021 Piala Sumbangsih was the 36th edition of the Piala Sumbangsih, an annual football match played between the winners of the previous season's Malaysia Super League and Malaysia Cup. Due to the COVID-19 pandemic, the 2020 Malaysia Cup and the 2020 Malaysia FA Cup tournaments were cancelled. Hence, the game was played between the champions of the 2020 Malaysia Super League, Johor Darul Ta'zim, and the league's runners-up, Kedah Darul Aman.

Johor Darul Ta'zim won the match 2–0, winning their sixth Piala Sumbangsih title.

== Match details ==
5 March 2021
21:00 UTC+8

Johor Darul Ta'zim	2–0	Kedah Darul Aman
Rasid 35'; Insa 68'	Report

Sultan Ibrahim Stadium, Iskandar Puteri, Johor
Attendance: 0
Referee: Nazmi Nasaruddin

GK	1	Farizal Marlias
DF	22	La'Vere Corbin-Ong
DF	33	Maurício	(yellow card) 30'
DF	7	Aidil Zafuan
DF	2	Matthew Davies
MF	10	Leandro Velázquez	(yellow card) 40'	(substituted off) 81'
MF	30	Natxo Insa		(substituted off) 81'
MF	4	Mohd Afiq Fazail		(substituted off) 90+2'
FW	11	Gonzalo Cabrera		(substituted off) 90+2'
FW	99	Fernando Rodriguez
FW	29	Safawi Rasid		(substituted off) 72'
Substitutes:
GK	24	Izham Tarmizi
DF	3	Adam Nor Azlin
DF	12	S. Kunanlan
DF	27	Fadhli Shas
MF	17	Ramadhan Saifullah		(substituted on) 90+2'
MF	14	Hariss Harun		(substituted on) 81'
MF	8	Safiq Rahim		(substituted on) 81'
FW	18	Hazwan Bakri		(substituted on) 90+2'
FW	42	Arif Aiman		(substituted on) 72'
Coach:
Benjamin Mora

GK	18	Ifwat Akmal		(substituted off) 51'
DF	3	Rodney Celvin
DF	13	Fairuz Zakaria
DF	15	Rizal Ghazali
DF	17	Syazwan Tajudin		(substituted off) 64'
MF	6	Anumanthan Kumar
MF	7	Baddrol Bakhtiar
MF	8	Rabih Ataya		(substituted off) 77'
MF	23	Faizat Ghazli		(substituted off) 46'
FW	9	Kpah Sherman	(yellow card) 30'
FW	10	Kipré Tchétché		(substituted off) 77'
Substitutes:
GK	1	Shahril Saa'ri		(substituted on) 51'
DF	30	Zulkhairi Zulkeply
MF	16	Amirul Hisyam		(substituted on) 64'
MF	20	Fadzrul Danel		(substituted on) 46'
MF	21	Fayadh Zulkifli
MF	22	Syazwan Zainon		(substituted on) 77'
FW	11	Rozaimi Rahman		(substituted on) 77'
Coach:
Aidil Sharin Sahak

Man of the Match:
Safawi Rasid (Johor Darul Ta'zim)

Assistant referees:
Mohamad Zairul Khalil Tan
Anuar Musa Majid
Fourth official:
Mohd Sarif Tahir

== Winners ==
2021 Piala Sumbangsih

Johor Darul Ta'zim
Sixth title
