= 2019 Malaysia Cup group stage =

Football tournament

The 2019 Malaysia Cup group stage began on 2 August and ended on 22 September 2019. A total of 16 teams competed in the group stage to decide the 8 places in the knockout stage of the 2019 Malaysia Cup.

== Draw ==
The draw for the group stage was held on 22 July 2019, 12:00 MYT (UTC+8), at the Damansara Performing Arts Centre in Petaling Jaya, Selangor. The 16 teams were drawn into 4 groups. In the group stage, each group was played on a home-and-away round-robin basis. The winners and runners-up of each group advanced to the knockout stage.

The 16 teams were drawn into four groups of four. For the draw, the teams were seeded into four pots based on the following principles (introduced starting this season):

- Pot 1, 2 and 3 contained the 11 top teams from 2019 Super League, seeded based on their final standings or end placements in the league.
- Pot 3 and 4 contained the 5 top teams from 2019 Premier League, seeded based on their final standings or end placements in the league.

The fixtures were decided after the draw, using a computer draw not shown to public, with the following match sequence.

Note: Positions for scheduling do not use the seeding pots, e.g. Team 1 is not necessarily the team from Pot 1 in the draw.

Group stage schedule
Matchday	Dates
Matchday 1	2–4 August 2019
Matchday 2	7–8 August 2019
Matchday 3	16–18 August 2019
Matchday 4	20–21 & 23–25 August 2019
Matchday 5	13–14 September 2019
Matchday 6	17–18 & 22 September 2019

== Teams ==
Below were the participating teams grouped by their seeding pot. They included:

- Final standings of 11 teams from 2019 Malaysia Super League which entered in this stage.
- Final standings of 5 teams from 2019 Malaysia Premier League which entered in this stage.

Key to colours
Teams from 2019 Malaysia Super League
Teams from 2019 Malaysia Premier League

Pot 1
Rank	Team
1	Johor Darul Ta'zim
2	Pahang
3	Selangor
4	Kedah

Pot 2
Rank	Team
5	Perak
6	Melaka United
7	Terengganu
8	Petaling Jaya City

Pot 3
Rank	Team
9	PKNS
10	FELDA United
11	PKNP
12	Sabah

Pot 4
Rank	Team
13	PDRM
14	UiTM
15	Negeri Sembilan
16	Penang

== Format ==
In each group, teams played against each other home-and-away in a round-robin format. The group winners and runners-up advanced to the quarter-finals.

=== Tiebreakers ===
Teams were ranked according to points (3 points for a win, 1 point for a draw, 0 points for a loss), and if tied on points, the following tiebreaking criteria were applied, in the order given, to determine the rankings:

1. Points in head-to-head matches among tied teams;
2. Goal difference in head-to-head matches among tied teams;
3. Goals scored in head-to-head matches among tied teams;
4. Away goals scored in head-to-head matches among tied teams;
5. If more than two teams were tied, and after applying all head-to-head criteria above, a subset of teams were still tied, all head-to-head criteria above was reapplied exclusively to this subset of teams;
6. Goal difference in all group matches;
7. Goals scored in all group matches;
8. Away goals scored in all group matches;
9. Wins in all group matches;
10. Away wins in all group matches;
11. Disciplinary points (red card = 3 points, yellow card = 1 point, expulsion for two yellow cards in one match = 3 points);

== Groups ==
The matchdays were 2–4 August, 7–8 August, 16–18 August, 20–21 & 23–25 August, 13–14 September, and 17–18 & 22 September 2019.

=== Group A ===
Pos	Team	Pld	W	D	L	GF	GA	GD	Pts	Qualification
1	Kedah	6	4	1	1	14	10	+4	13	Advance to knockout stage
2	Terengganu	6	4	0	2	14	8	+6	12	Advance to knockout stage
3	Negeri Sembilan	6	2	0	4	11	15	−4	6	
4	PKNS	6	1	1	4	7	13	−6	4	

Source: FAM MFL
2 August 2019
21:00 UTC+8

Terengganu	3–1	PKNS
Shaakhmedov 6', 90+4'; Nasrullah 38'	Report	Jafri 30'

Sultan Ismail Nasiruddin Shah Stadium, Kuala Terengganu
Attendance: 5,800
Referee: Fairuzi Mat Desa
3 August 2019
21:00 UTC+8

Negeri Sembilan	1–3	Kedah
Ferris 78'	Report	Rodríguez 4'; Shakir 72'; Bauman 83' (pen.)

Tuanku Abdul Rahman Stadium, Paroi
Attendance: 6,207
Referee: Zamzaidi Katimin

7 August 2019
21:00 UTC+8

Negeri Sembilan	1–2	PKNS
Igor 90+2'	Report	Guerra 15', 31'

Tuanku Abdul Rahman Stadium, Paroi
Attendance: 1,619
Referee: Suhaizi Shukri
8 August 2019
21:00 UTC+8

Kedah	0–2	Terengganu
	Report	Tchétché 66', 86'

Darulaman Stadium, Alor Setar
Attendance: 9,386
Referee: Fairuzi Mat Desa

16 August 2019
21:00 UTC+8

PKNS	1–1	Kedah
Morales 70'	Report	Rodríguez 20'

Shah Alam Stadium, Shah Alam
Attendance: 2,035
Referee: Zamzaidi Katimin
17 August 2019
21:00 UTC+8

Terengganu	3–1	Negeri Sembilan
Tchétché 42', 57', 86'	Report	Igor 67'

Sultan Ismail Nasiruddin Shah Stadium, Kuala Terengganu
Attendance: 7,750
Referee: Fitri Maskon

20 August 2019
21:00 UTC+8

Kedah	3–2	PKNS
Bauman 50', 84'; Alif 90'	Report	Morales 30'; Swirad 70'

Darulaman Stadium, Alor Setar
Attendance: 3,149
Referee: Zulkarnain Zakaria
23 August 2019
21:00 UTC+8

Negeri Sembilan	3–2	Terengganu
Ferris 3'; José Neto 6' (pen.); Igor 66'	Report	Tuck 36' (pen.); Andryeyev 90+3'

Tuanku Abdul Rahman Stadium, Paroi
Attendance: 2,216
Referee: Zamzaidi Katimin

13 September 2019
21:00 UTC+8

Terengganu	2–3	Kedah
Tuck 33' (pen.); Malik 60'	Report	Bauman 4'; Bernhardt 37'; Baddrol 86'

Sultan Ismail Nasiruddin Shah Stadium, Kuala Terengganu
Attendance: 10,200
Referee: Zulkifli Ahmad
13 September 2019
21:00 UTC+8

PKNS	1–3	Negeri Sembilan
Sherman 45+6' (pen.)	Report	Ferris 42', 56'; Igor 90+2'

Shah Alam Stadium, Shah Alam
Attendance: 252
Referee: Fitri Maskon

17 September 2019
21:00 UTC+8

Kedah	4–2	Negeri Sembilan
Farhan 18'; Rodríguez 45'; Fayadh 78'; Bernhardt 90' (pen.)	Report	Igor 34'; Ferris 66'

Darulaman Stadium, Alor Setar
Attendance: 5,834
Referee: Zamzaidi Katimin
17 September 2019
21:00 UTC+8

PKNS	0–2	Terengganu
	Report	Shaakhmedov 4'; Tchétché 9'

Shah Alam Stadium, Shah Alam
Attendance: 1,243
Referee: Ahmad Zuhadi Dzulkifli

=== Group B ===
Pos	Team	Pld	W	D	L	GF	GA	GD	Pts	Qualification
1	Johor Darul Ta'zim	6	5	1	0	19	8	+11	16	Advance to knockout stage
2	PKNP	6	3	1	2	12	9	+3	10	Advance to knockout stage
3	Petaling Jaya City	6	3	0	3	9	11	−2	9	
4	UiTM	6	0	0	6	2	14	−12	0	

Source: FAM MFL
2 August 2019
21:00 UTC+8

Johor Darul Ta'zim	3–1	UiTM
Diogo 16', 83'; Safawi 65' (pen.)	Report	Korać 90+2'

Tan Sri Dato' Haji Hassan Yunos Stadium, Larkin
Attendance: 5,860
Referee: Suhaizi Shukri
3 August 2019
21:00 UTC+8

Petaling Jaya City	2–1	PKNP
Pedro Henrique 11'; Elizeu 81'	Report	Pedro Victor 37'

MBPJ Stadium, Petaling Jaya
Attendance: 348
Referee: Zohri Tajuddin

7 August 2019
21:00 UTC+8

Johor Darul Ta'zim	4–2	Petaling Jaya City
Safawi 6'; Diogo 47', 72'; Cabrera 81'	Report	Brandão 59'; Barathkumar 70'

Tan Sri Dato' Haji Hassan Yunos Stadium, Larkin
Attendance: 6,318
Referee: Zulkarnain Zakaria
8 August 2019
21:00 UTC+8

UiTM	0–2	PKNP
	Report	Aguinaldo 45'; Pedro Victor 85'

UiTM Stadium, Shah Alam
Attendance: 382
Referee: Mat Zan Abdul Wahab

16 August 2019
21:00 UTC+8

PKNP	2–2	Johor Darul Ta'zim
Yashir 35' (pen.); Giancarlo 78'	Report	Cabrera 9', 14'

Manjung Municipal Council Stadium, Seri Manjung
Attendance: 3,056
Referee: Wan Mohamad Tarmizi
18 August 2019
21:00 UTC+8

Petaling Jaya City	1–0	UiTM
Pedro Henrique 29'	Report

MBPJ Stadium, Petaling Jaya
Attendance: 146
Referee: Nazmi Nasaruddin

23 August 2019
21:00 UTC+8

Johor Darul Ta'zim	5–0	PKNP
Maurício 13'; Cabrera 31'; Safawi 36' (pen.), 62'; Diogo 51' (pen.)	Report

Tan Sri Dato' Haji Hassan Yunos Stadium, Larkin
Attendance: 8,460
Referee: Razlan Joffri Ali
25 August 2019
21:00 UTC+8

UiTM	0–2	Petaling Jaya City
	Report	Brandão 33'; Satish 71'

UiTM Stadium, Shah Alam
Attendance: 250
Referee: Suhaizi Shukri

13 September 2019
21:00 UTC+8

Petaling Jaya City	2–3	Johor Darul Ta'zim
Beom-geun 11'; Brandão 58'	Report	Safawi 24'; Syafiq 36', 60'

MBPJ Stadium, Petaling Jaya
Attendance: 2,856
Referee: Wan Mohamad Tarmizi
13 September 2019
21:00 UTC+8

PKNP	4–0	UiTM
Giancarlo 10', 85', 87'; Hafiz 65'	Report

Manjung Municipal Council Stadium, Seri Manjung
Attendance: 300
Referee: Zohri Tajuddin

17 September 2019
21:00 UTC+8

UiTM	1–2	Johor Darul Ta'zim
Zulkiffli 39'	Report	Adam 45+2'; Fadhli 59'

UiTM Stadium, Shah Alam
Attendance: 1,513
Referee: Khirulazuan Kidam
22 September 2019
21:00 UTC+8

PKNP	3–0	Petaling Jaya City
Yashir 9', 61'; Khairul 46'	Report

Manjung Municipal Council Stadium, Seri Manjung
Attendance: 350
Referee: Suhaizi Shukri

=== Group C ===
Pos	Team	Pld	W	D	L	GF	GA	GD	Pts	Qualification
1	Pahang	6	5	0	1	12	5	+7	15	Advance to knockout stage
2	Perak	6	2	3	1	9	7	+2	9	Advance to knockout stage
3	Penang	6	1	2	3	5	10	−5	5	
4	Sabah	6	1	1	4	5	9	−4	4	

Source: FAM MFL
3 August 2019
21:00 UTC+8

Pahang	3–1	Penang
Nwakaeme 58' (pen.); Sumareh 66'; Muslim 84'	Report	Bottaro 51'

Darul Makmur Stadium, Kuantan
Attendance: 4,220
Referee: Zulkarnain Zakaria
4 August 2019
21:00 UTC+8

Perak	3–0	Sabah
Brendan 45'; Careca 51'; Leandro 90+2'	Report

Perak Stadium, Ipoh
Attendance: 3,700
Referee: Suhaimi Mat Hassan

7 August 2019
16:15 UTC+8

Penang	2–1	Sabah
Bottaro 9'; Evan 73' (o.g.)	Report	Paunović 48' (pen.)

City Stadium, George Town
Attendance: 5,141
Referee: Zulkifli Ahmad
8 August 2019
21:00 UTC+8

Pahang	3–0	Perak
Goulon 40'; Saddil 68'; Lazarus 82'	Report

Darul Makmur Stadium, Kuantan
Attendance: 5,183
Referee: Wan Mohamad Tarmizi

17 August 2019
20:15 UTC+8

Sabah	1–2	Pahang
Aguinaldo 54'	Report	Nwakaeme 2'; Lazarus 35'

Likas Stadium, Kota Kinabalu
Attendance: 2,000
Referee: Suhaizi Shukri
17 August 2019
21:00 UTC+8

Perak	1–1	Penang
Ronaldo 12'	Report	Casagrande 63'

Perak Stadium, Ipoh
Attendance: 6,990
Referee: Tuan Mohd Yaasin

24 August 2019
21:00 UTC+8

Penang	1–1	Perak
Nurfais 48'	Report	Leandro 60'

City Stadium, George Town
Attendance: 9,847
Referee: Hamdan Awang
24 August 2019
21:00 UTC+8

Pahang	1–0	Sabah
Nwakaeme 57'	Report

Darul Makmur Stadium, Kuantan
Attendance: 5,416
Referee: Suhaimi Mat Hassan

14 September 2019
20:15 UTC+8

Sabah	2–0	Penang
Musa 54'; Paunović 82'	Report

Likas Stadium, Kota Kinabalu
Attendance: 650
Referee: Zamzaidi Katimin
14 September 2019
21:00 UTC+8

Perak	3–1	Pahang
Ronaldo 31'; Shahrel 45', 47'	Report	Lazarus 85'

Perak Stadium, Ipoh
Attendance: 7,009
Referee: Razlan Joffri Ali

18 September 2019
21:00 UTC+8

Sabah	1–1	Perak
Musa 49'	Report	Ronaldo 26'

Likas Stadium, Kota Kinabalu
Attendance: 670
Referee: Tuan Mohd Yaasin
18 September 2019
21:00 UTC+8

Penang	0–2	Pahang
	Report	Goulon 52'; Segar 57' (o.g.)

City Stadium, George Town
Attendance: 2,048
Referee: Hasrol Amir

=== Group D ===
Pos	Team	Pld	W	D	L	GF	GA	GD	Pts	Qualification
1	Selangor	6	2	4	0	9	6	+3	10	Advance to knockout stage
2	Melaka United	6	2	2	2	10	9	+1	8	Advance to knockout stage
3	FELDA United	6	2	1	3	10	12	−2	7	
4	PDRM	6	1	3	2	10	12	−2	6	

Source: FAM MFL
3 August 2019
21:00 UTC+8

Selangor	2–2	FELDA United
Syazwan 34'; Ifedayo 40'	Report	Christie 42'; Khairul 86' (pen.)

Shah Alam Stadium, Shah Alam
Attendance: 3,134
Referee: Nazmi Nasaruddin
4 August 2019
21:00 UTC+8

Melaka United	3–1	PDRM
Nazrin 11', 61'; Reichelt 55'	Report	Lee 8'

Hang Jebat Stadium, Krubong
Attendance: 3,272
Referee: Nafeez Abd Wahab

7 August 2019
21:00 UTC+8

PDRM	4–3	FELDA United
Wleh 37'; Gopinathan 78', 88'; Azmizi 90+3'	Report	Chanturu 9'; Khairul 18', 56'

Hang Jebat Stadium, Krubong
Attendance: 320
Referee: Tuan Mohd Yaasin
8 August 2019
21:00 UTC+8

Melaka United	0–1	Selangor
	Report	Suk-won 61' (o.g.)

Hang Jebat Stadium, Krubong
Attendance: 4,149
Referee: Suhaimi Mat Hassan

17 August 2019
21:00 UTC+8

FELDA United	1–3	Melaka United
Khairul 74'	Report	Deevan 12', 62'; Milunović 31'

Tun Abdul Razak Stadium, Jengka
Attendance: 520
Referee: Hamdan Awang
18 August 2019
21:00 UTC+8

Selangor	1–1	PDRM
Sandro 52'	Report	Redžović 60'

Shah Alam Stadium, Shah Alam
Attendance: 2,110
Referee: Nafeez Abd Wahab

21 August 2019
21:00 UTC+8

PDRM	2–2	Selangor
Agba 28'; Lee 87'	Report	Regan 69'; Ifedayo 80'

Hang Jebat Stadium, Krubong
Attendance: 615
Referee: Fairuzi Mat Desa
24 August 2019
21:00 UTC+8

Melaka United	1–3	FELDA United
Milunović 37'	Report	Hadin 45+2', 75' (pen.); Danial Amier 69'

Hang Jebat Stadium, Krubong
Attendance: 3,460
Referee: Nafeez Abd Wahab

14 September 2019
21:00 UTC+8

Selangor	1–1	Melaka United
Khyril 38'	Report	Saiful 49'

Shah Alam Stadium, Shah Alam
Attendance: 2,511
Referee: Suhaimi Mat Hassan
14 September 2019
21:00 UTC+8

FELDA United	1–0	PDRM
Chanturu 59'	Report

Tun Abdul Razak Stadium, Jengka
Attendance: 678
Referee: Hamdan Awang

18 September 2019
21:00 UTC+8

FELDA United	0–2	Selangor
	Report	Ifedayo 16'; Khyril 73'

Tun Abdul Razak Stadium, Jengka
Attendance: 1,277
Referee: Fairuzi Mat Desa
18 September 2019
21:00 UTC+8

PDRM	2–2	Melaka United
Fakrul 10'; Agba 31'	Report	Milunović 9'; Safiq 54' (pen.)

Hang Jebat Stadium, Krubong
Attendance: 2,237
Referee: Suhaimi Mat Hassan
