= 2019 Malaysia Cup knockout stage =

The 2019 Malaysia Cup knockout stage began on 21 September 2018 and concluded on 2 November 2019 with the final at Bukit Jalil National Stadium in Kuala Lumpur, to decide the champions of the 2019 Malaysia Cup. A total of 8 teams competed in the knockout phase.

== Qualified teams ==
The knockout phase involves the eight teams which qualified as winners and runners-up of each of the four groups in the group stage.

Group	Winners (Seeded in quarter final draw)	Runners-up (Unseeded in quarter final draw)
A	Kedah	Terengganu
B	Johor Darul Ta'zim	PKNP
C	Pahang	Perak
D	Selangor	Melaka United

== Format ==
Each tie in the knockout phase, apart from the final, was played over two legs, with each team playing one leg at home. The team that scored more goals on aggregate over the two legs advanced to the next round. If the aggregate score was level, the away goals rule was applied, i.e. the team that scored more goals away from home over the two legs advanced. If away goals were also equal, then thirty minutes of extra time was played. The away goals rule was again applied after extra time, i.e. if there were goals scored during extra time and the aggregate score was still level, the visiting team advanced by virtue of more away goals scored. If no goals were scored during extra time, the tie was decided by penalty shoot-out. In the final, which was played as a single match, if scores were level at the end of normal time, extra time was played, followed by penalty shoot-out if scores remained tied.

The mechanism of the draws for each round was as follows:

- In the draw for the quarter-final, the four group winners were seeded, and the four group runners-up were unseeded. The seeded teams were drawn against the unseeded teams, with the seeded teams hosting the second leg. Teams from the same group or the same association could not be drawn against each other.
- In the draws for the quarter-finals onwards, there were no seedings, and teams from the same group or the same association could be drawn against each other.

== Schedule ==
The schedule was as follows (all draws were held at the Damansara Performing Arts Centre in Petaling Jaya).

Round	Draw date and time	First leg	Second leg
Quarter-finals	22 July 2019, 11:00 UTC+8	21–22 & 25 September 2019	28–29 September 2019
Semi-finals	22 July 2019, 11:00 UTC+8	19 October 2019	26 October 2019
Final	22 July 2019, 11:00 UTC+8	2 November 2019 at Bukit Jalil National Stadium, Kuala Lumpur	

== Bracket ==
Quarter-finals
B2	PKNP	1	1	2
A1	Kedah	2	4	6
D2	Melaka United	0	1	1
C1	Pahang	3	3	6
A2	Terengganu	0	1	1
B1	Johor Darul Ta'zim	1	4	5
C2	Perak	1	1	2
D1	Selangor	0	3	3

Semi-finals
Kedah (a)	3	5	8
Pahang	3	5	8
Johor Darul Ta'zim	2	3	5
Selangor	1	0	1

Final
Kedah	0
Johor Darul Ta'zim	3

== Quarter-finals ==
The first legs were played on 21, 22 and 25 September, and the second legs were played on 28 and 29 September 2019.

Team 1	Agg.	Team 2	1st leg	2nd leg
Terengganu	1–5	Johor Darul Ta'zim	0–1	1–4
Melaka United	1–6	Pahang	0–3	1–3
Perak	2–3	Selangor	1–0	1–3
PKNP	2–6	Kedah	1–2	1–4

=== Matches ===
First leg

21 September 2019
21:00 UTC+8

Terengganu	0–1	Johor Darul Ta'zim
	Report	Diogo 22'

Sultan Ismail Nasiruddin Shah Stadium, Kuala Terengganu
Attendance: 11,250
Referee: Wan Mohamad Tarmizi

Second leg

28 September 2019
21:00 UTC+8

Johor Darul Ta'zim	4–1	Terengganu
Cabrera 16' (pen.), 39'; Safawi 22', 36'	Report	Tuck 45'

Tan Sri Dato' Haji Hassan Yunos Stadium, Larkin
Attendance: 16,160
Referee: Zulkarnain Zakaria

Johor Darul Ta'zim won 5−1 on aggregate.

First leg

22 September 2019
21:00 UTC+8

Melaka United	0–3	Pahang
	Report	Lazarus 56'; Zaharulnizam 58'; Nwakaeme 61'

Hang Jebat Stadium, Krubong
Attendance: 5,450
Referee: Amirul Izwan Yaacob

Second leg

29 September 2019
21:00 UTC+8

Pahang	3–1	Melaka United
Lazarus 41'; Nwakaeme 65', 76'	Report	Nazrin 54'

Darul Makmur Stadium, Kuantan
Attendance: 8,605
Referee: Nazmi Nasaruddin

Pahang won 6−1 on aggregate.

First leg

22 September 2019
21:00 UTC+8

Perak	1–0	Selangor
Brendan 13'	Report

Perak Stadium, Ipoh
Attendance: 10,200
Referee: Zohri Tajuddin

Second leg

29 September 2019
21:00 UTC+8

Selangor	3–1	Perak
Syazwan 33'; Khyril 45', 68'	Report	Brendan 83'

Shah Alam Stadium, Shah Alam
Attendance: 12,441
Referee: Suhaizi Shukri

Selangor won 3−2 on aggregate.

First leg

25 September 2019
21:00 UTC+8

PKNP	1–2	Kedah
Yashir 37'	Report	Rodríguez 50'; Rowley 73'

Manjung Municipal Council Stadium, Seri Manjung
Attendance: 3,318
Referee: Razlan Joffri Ali

Second leg

29 September 2019
21:00 UTC+8

Kedah	4–1	PKNP
Farhan 24'; Bauman 25'; Rowley 72'; Fayadh 90'	Report	Mukhairi 80'

Darul Aman Stadium, Alor Setar
Attendance: 12,641
Referee: Zamzaidi Katimin

Kedah won 6−2 on aggregate.

== Semi-finals ==
The first legs were played on 19 October, and the second legs were played on 26 October 2019.

Team 1	Agg.	Team 2	1st leg	2nd leg
Kedah	8–8 (a)	Pahang	3–3	5–5 (a.e.t.)
Johor Darul Ta'zim	5–1	Selangor	2–1	3–0

=== Matches ===
First leg

19 October 2019
21:00 UTC+8

Kedah	3–3	Pahang
Rodríguez 32', 40' (pen.); Zaquan 90+4'	Report	Zaharulnizam 13'; Nwakaeme 26' (pen.); Azam 72'

Darul Aman Stadium, Alor Setar
Attendance: 23,483
Referee: Zamzaidi Katimin

Second leg

26 October 2019
21:00 UTC+8

Pahang	5–5 (a.e.t.)	Kedah
Nwakaeme 33', 120+2'; Lazarus 71', 75'; Goulon 112' (pen.)	Report	Rodríguez 8', 117'; Bauman 55'; Baddrol 85'; Alves 93'

Darul Makmur Stadium, Kuantan
Attendance: 29,275
Referee: Suhaimi Mat Hassan

8−8 on aggregate. Kedah won on away goals.

First leg

19 October 2019
21:00 UTC+8

Johor Darul Ta'zim	2–1	Selangor
Syafiq 15'; Velázquez 50'	Report	Ifedayo 18'

Tan Sri Dato' Haji Hassan Yunos Stadium, Larkin
Attendance: 21,130
Referee: Fairuzi Mat Desa

Second leg

26 October 2019
21:00 UTC+8

Selangor	0–3	Johor Darul Ta'zim
	Report	Safawi 25', 46', 51'

Shah Alam Stadium, Shah Alam
Attendance: 65,317
Referee: Nazmi Nasaruddin

Johor Darul Ta'zim won 5−1 on aggregate.

== Final ==
The final was played on 2 November 2019 at the Bukit Jalil National Stadium in Kuala Lumpur.

2 November 2019
21:00 UTC+8

Kedah	0–3	Johor Darul Ta'zim
	Report	Velázquez 27'; Safawi 35'; Syafiq 58'

Bukit Jalil National Stadium, Kuala Lumpur
Attendance: 83,420
Referee: Nazmi Nasaruddin
