= 2018 Piala Sumbangsih =

Johor Darul Ta'zim	Kedah
2	1
- Date: 3 February 2018
- Venue: Larkin Stadium, Johor Bahru
- Referee: Mohd Zohri Tajuddin
- Attendance: 23,030

The 2018 Piala Sumbangsih was the 33rd edition of the Piala Sumbangsih, an annual football match played between the winners of the previous season's Malaysia Super League and Malaysia Cup. But since both competitions are won by the same club the previous year, the match will be played against Malaysia FA Cup winner's instead. The game was played between the Kedah FA, winners of the 2017 Malaysia FA Cup, and Johor Darul Ta'zim F.C., champions of the 2017 Malaysia Super League.

== Match details ==
3 February 2018
21:00 UTC+8

Johor Darul Ta'zim	2–1	Kedah
Figueroa 28'; Antonio 57'		Pablo Pallares 14'

Larkin Stadium, Johor Bahru, Johor
Attendance: 23020
Referee: Mohd Zohri Tajuddin

GK	24	Izham Tarmizi
DF	6	Marcos Antonio	(substituted off) 76'
DF	22	La'Vere Corbin-Ong
DF	27	Fadhli Shas
MF	14	Hariss Harun
MF	10	Natxo Insa
MF	8	Safiq Rahim
DF	12	S. Kunanlan
FW	23	Gonzalo Cabrera	(substituted off) 82'
FW	19	Luciano Figueroa	(substituted off) 87'
FW	11	Jorge Pereyra Díaz
Substitutes:
MF	13	Gary Steven Robbat	(substituted on) 76'
FW	9	Hazwan Bakri	(substituted on) 82'
FW	29	Safawi Rasid	(substituted on) 87'
MF	4	Mohd Afiq Fazail
DF	7	Aidil Zafuan
DF	20	Azrif Nasrulhaq
GK	26	Haziq Nadzli
Coach:
Ulisses Morais

GK	25	Ifwat Akmal
DF	13	Khairul Helmi Johari
DF	17	Syazwan Tajuddin
MF	10	Sandro da Silva	(yellow card) 56'
MF	22	Syazwan Zainon		(substituted off) 72'
MF	7	Baddrol Bakhtiar
MF	8	Liridon Krasniqi
MF	27	Ariff Farhan Isa	(yellow card) 22'
MF	35	Hidhir Idris		(substituted off) 46'
FW	9	Pablo Pallares
DF	15	Rizal Ghazali
Substitutes:
MF	16	Amirul Hisyam Awang Kechik		(substituted on) 46'
MF	19	Muhammad Farhan Roslan		(substituted on) 72'
GK	1	Abdul Hadi Abdul Hamid
DF	2	Syawal Nordin
DF	5	Norfiqrie Talib
MF	14	Akram Mahinan
MF	20	Akhyar Rashid
Coach:
Ramon Marcote

Match officials

- Referee:
  - Mohd Zohri Tajuddin
- Assistant referees:
  - Mohd Mu'azi Zainal Abidin
  - Azman Ismail
- Fourth official:
  - Hasman Hisam Asngari

== Winners ==
2018 Piala Sumbangsih

Johor Darul Ta'zim
Third title
