= Aidil Sharin Sahak =

Singaporean footballer and coach

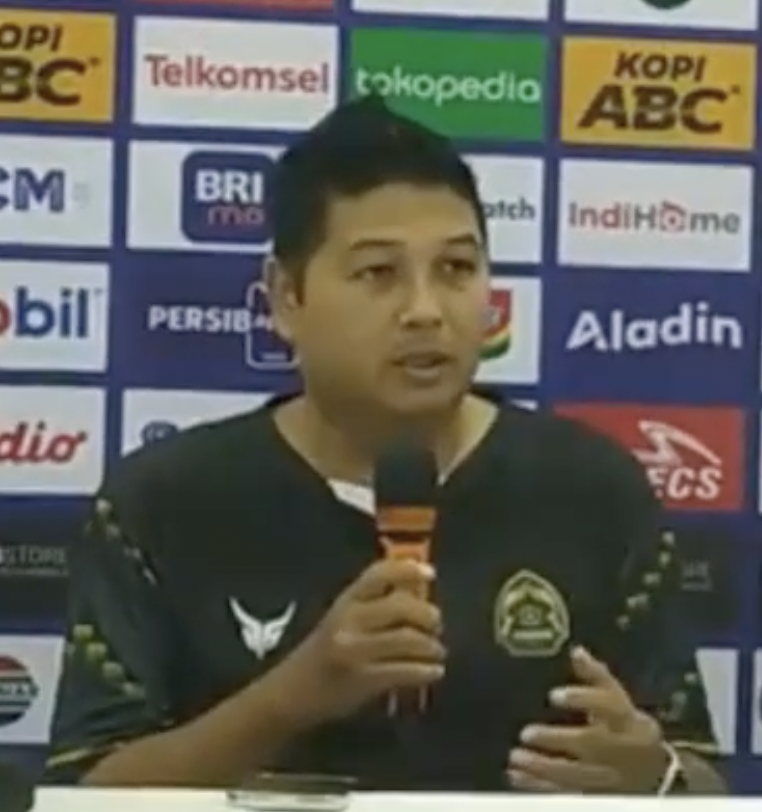

Personal information
- Full name: Aidil Sharin bin Sahak
- Date of birth: 9 July 1977 (age 49)
- Place of birth: Singapore
- Height: 1.76 m (5 ft 9 in)
- Position: Midfielder

Team information
- Current team: Kuching City (head coach)

Senior career*
Years	Team	Apps	(Gls)
1997	Home United		
1998	Tanjong Pagar United		
1999–2001	Home United		
2001	Tampines Rovers		
2002–2006	Home United	87	(12)
2007	SAFFC		

Managerial career
- 2012–2016: Home United (assistant)
- 2016–2018: Home United
- 2018–2022: Kedah Darul Aman
- 2023: Persikabo 1973
- 2023–: Kuching City
- * Club domestic league appearances and goals

Aidil Sharin Sahak (born 9 July 1977) is a former Singaporean football player and professional football head coach. He is currently the head coach of the Malaysia Super League club, Kuching City.

He is widely regarded as one of the best man-managers in Malaysian football, praised for his ability to instil a strong dressing-room culture, counter-attacking and defensive tactical discipline, and team confidence.

== Club career ==
=== Home United ===
Aidil Sharin started his professional career with Home United in 1997.

=== Tanjong Pagar United ===
After spending one season at Home United, Aidil Sharin joined his former academy team, Tanjong Pagar United ahead of the 1998 S.League season. In his first season, he won a cup double helping the club to win the 1998 Singapore Cup and the 1998 Singapore FA Cup.

=== Return to Home United ===
In 1999, Aidil Sharin returned to Home United.

=== Tampines Rovers ===
Aidil Sharin joined Tampines Rovers in 2001 after spending two season at Home United.

=== Third Spell at Home United ===
Aidil Sharin then returned to Home United for the third time of his career in 2002. In the 2003 season, he helped the club to a double winning the 2003 S.League and the 2003 Singapore Cup. In 2005, he also won the Singapore Cup.

=== SAFFC ===
After spending five season at Home United, Aidil Sharin joined Uniform Derby rivals, SAFFC for the 2007 season. In his first season, he steered the club to his third double by winning the 2007 S.League and the 2007 Singapore Cup which he became the first and only player to win a double for third Singaporean club. Aidil Sharin then announced his retirement at the end of the season.

== Managerial career ==
=== Home United ===
In 2012, Aidil Sharin joined Lee Lim-saeng as his assistant coach at Home United and under Philippe Aw as his assistant coach until 2016. On 4 August 2016, Aidil Sharin was promoted to the head coach role after Philippe was relief of his duties. He led Home United to 2nd place in the 1st season of the Singapore Premier League in 2018. He also led the club to the 2017 AFC Cup Zonal finals and 2018 AFC Cup Inter-zone play-off semi-finals.

=== Kedah Darul Aman ===
On 8 October 2018, Aidil Sharin had been appointed as Kedah Darul Aman head coach for the 2019 Malaysia Super League season. On his debut on 2 February 2019, the side won 2–0 against PKNP through a Shakir Hamzah and Jonatan Bauman goal. On 8 March 2019, Aidil Sharin experienced his first defeat in charge of Kedah as the club fell to a 1–0 defeat at the hands of Pahang. Kedah finished in fourth position in the Malaysia Super League in his first season in charge, one position higher than the previous season. On 27 July 2019, he led Kedah to win the 2019 Malaysia FA Cup after a 1–0 win over Perak in the final. The following 26 October, the team reached the final of the 2019 Malaysia Cup following a 8–8 aggregate win over Sri Pahang, only to be beaten 3–0 by Johor Darul Ta'zim in the decisive game at Bukit Jalil National Stadium.

Aidil Sharin became the first Singaporean head coach to manage a non-Singaporean team in the AFC Champions League when he guided Kedah into the 2020 AFC Champions League qualifying play-offs round which they thrash Hong Kong club, Tai Po 5–1 in the preliminary round 2 and thus seeing them advance to face FC Seoul in the play-off round which subsequently ended up as a 4–1 defeat at the Seoul World Cup Stadium.

On 17 October 2022, it was announced that Kedah Darul Aman had parted ways with Aidil Sharin. Aidil Sharin departed Kedah Darul Aman with a record of 55 wins, 20 draws, and 35 defeats in 110 games with a win percentage of 50%. During the four years that he was the head coach, Aidil Sharin guided Kedah to several highs, including emerging as 2019 Malaysia FA Cup champions, 2019 Malaysia Cup runners-up, 2020 and 2021 Malaysia Super League runners-up as well as reaching the 2022 AFC Cup ASEAN Zone semi-finals.

=== Persikabo 1973 ===
On 7 January 2023, Aidil was announced as the new head coach of Indonesian Liga 1 team, Persikabo 1973 on an initial 5-month contract. He is the first Singaporean to coach an Indonesian team since Fandi Ahmad coached Pelita Jaya from 2006 to 2010.

Aidin Sharin left the club by mutual agreement, on 23 July 2023, citing family matters as the reason for his departure.

=== Kuching City ===
Aidil Sharin returned to Malaysia when Kuching City unveiled him as their new head coach on 2 August 2023. He joined fellow compatriot Fandi Ahmad, who coached Sri Pahang in the 2023 Malaysia Super League season. Aidil Sharin took over Kuching City towards the end of the 2023 Malaysia Super League season, taking over with the team on a 17-game winless run, finishing 13th out of 14 in the league table. He guided the club to a great run in the 2023 MFL Challenge Cup winning 4–0 on aggregate against his former club, Kedah Darul Aman in the quarter-finals, a 3–1 on aggregate against Kelantan United in the semi-finals which saw the club first ever cup final in their history in which Kuching City lost 4–1 against PDRM in the final.

In his second season at the club, he overhauled the ageing squad by signing African imports Jordan Mintah, Kipré Tchétché and James Okwuosa. Aidil Sharin then steered Kuching City to a fourth-placed finish in the Super League. He also won the Best Coach award at the National Football Awards at the end of the 2024-25 season.

In the 2025-26 season of the Malaysia Super League, Aidil Sharin led Kuching City to its best performance ever in both the Piala Malaysia and the domestic league, reaching the finals and qualifying for the AFC Champions League Two for the first time ever, beating out Selangor FC with 53 points from 16 wins and five draws.

On 30 May 2026, Aidil's contract was extended for another three years, keeping him at the club until the end of the 2028-29 season.

== Personal life ==
Aidil is the younger brother of former Singapore national footballer Aide Iskandar.

== Managerial statistics ==
As of match played 20 November 2026

Managerial record by team and tenure
Team	Nat.	From	To	Record					Ref.
Team	Nat.	From	To	G	W	D	L	Win %	Ref.
Home United	(Singapore)	4 August 2016	7 October 2018	91	50	17	24	54.95	
Kedah Darul Aman	(Malaysia)	8 October 2018	17 October 2022	110	55	20	35	50.00	
Persikabo 1973	(Indonesia)	7 January 2023	23 July 2023	21	6	4	11	28.57	
Kuching City	(Malaysia)	2 August 2023	Present	102	49	25	28	48.04	
Career Total				324	160	66	98	49.38	

== Honours ==
=== As player ===
==== Tanjong Pagar United ====
- Singapore Cup: 1998
- Singapore FA Cup: 1998

==== Home United ====
- S.League: 2003
- Singapore Cup: 2003, 2005

==== SAFFC ====
- S.League: 2007
- Singapore Cup: 2007

=== As manager ===
Kedah

- Malaysia FA Cup: 2019
- Malaysia Super League runner-up: 2020, 2021

Kuching City

- MFL Challenge Cup runner-up: 2023

=== Individual ===
- FAM Football Awards – Best Coach: 2024–25
