= Anmar Almubaraki =

Iraqi footballer (born 1991)

Personal information
- Full name: Anmar Fares Abdul Jabar Almubaraki
- Date of birth: 1 July 1991 (age 35)
- Place of birth: Basra, Iraq
- Position: Attacking midfielder

Youth career
- Hulzense Boys
- 2005–2010: FC Twente

Senior career*
Years	Team	Apps	(Gls)
2010–2012	Heracles Almelo	5	(0)
2012–2014	FC Emmen	47	(3)
2014–2015	Telstar	30	(6)
2015–2016	Denizlispor	7	(0)
2016	Syrianska	8	(0)
2017	Persiba Balikpapan	29	(8)
2018	Army United	4	(1)
2019	Kedah	6	(1)
- * Club domestic league appearances and goals as of 17:36, 20 February 2019 (UTC)

Anmar Fares Abdul Jabar Almubaraki (born 1 July 1991) is an Iraqi professional footballer who plays as an attacking midfielder.

== Club career ==
Born in Basra, Iraq, Almubaraki came to the Netherlands when only 2 years of age and started playing football with Hulzense Boys, later joining the FC Twente Football Academy.

He made his senior debut for Heracles Almelo in the 2010–11 season, against Roda JC. He left them for FC Emmen in summer 2012, and later joined Telstar, before moving abroad to play for Turkish second division side Denizlispor. He left Denizlispor after 7 months, claiming the club owed him several months' wages.

In April 2017, Almubaraki signed a one-season contract with Persiba Balikpapan in the Liga indonesia. He played 29 games, scoring 8 goals and 3 assists for Persiba Balikpapan.

In January 2018, he signed a one-year contract with Thai side Army United. Anmar scored a goal first against Khon Kaen FC. He moved to Malaysian club Kedah FA in November 2018.

== International career ==
In June 2011, he and some other European-based players, were called up to train with the Iraq national football team by coach Wolfgang Sidka. When he arrived in Iraq he got a lot of attention. He played several friendly matches against Iraqi clubs.
