= Alif Yusof =

Malaysian footballer

Personal information
- Full name: Mohd Alif Bin Mohd Yusof
- Date of birth: 19 January 1991 (age 35)
- Place of birth: Sabah, Malaysia
- Height: 1.72 m (5 ft 7 1/2 in)
- Position: Defender

Team information
- Current team: Real Mambau F.C.
- Number: 6

Senior career*
Years	Team	Apps	(Gls)
2011–2016	Johor Darul Ta'zim II	32	(1)
2017–2018	Felda United	34	(0)
2019–2020	Kedah FA	14	(0)
- * Club domestic league appearances and goals

Mohd Alif Bin Mohd Yusof (born 19 January 1991) is a Malaysian professional footballer who plays as a defender.

== Career statistics ==
=== Club ===
As of 6 November 2020

Club performance		League		Cup		League Cup		Continental		Total	
Season	Club	Apps	Goals	Apps	Goals	Apps	Goals	Apps	Goals	Apps	Goals
2017	Felda United	18	0	0	0	9	0	5	0	32	0
2018	Felda United	17	0	4	0	5	0	0	0	26	0
Total		35	0	4	0	14	0	5	0	58	0
2019	Kedah	11	0	3	0	4	1	0	0	18	1
2020	Kedah	3	0	0	0	1	0	2	0	6	0
Total		14	0	3	0	5	1	2	0	24	1
Career Total		0	0	0	0	0	0	–	–	0	0

== Honours ==
=== Club ===
Kedah

- Malaysia FA Cup: 2019
