= Fakrul Aiman =

Malaysian footballer

Personal information
- Full name: Muhammad Fakrul Aiman bin Sidid
- Date of birth: 12 August 1989 (age 37)
- Place of birth: Kelantan, Malaysia
- Height: 1.76 m (5 ft 9 1/2 in)
- Position: Winger

Team information
- Current team: Teck Hin F.C.
- Number: 25

Youth career
- 2008: UPB–MyTeam

Senior career*
Years	Team	Apps	(Gls)
2009	UPB–MyTeam	0	(1)
2011	Rapid KL		
2012	POS Malaysia	17	(3)
2012	→ PKNS (loan)	0	(0)
2013–2014	PKNS	9	(1)
2015–2016	DRB–Hicom	31	(7)
2016	PDRM	9	(3)
2017	Felda United	8	(0)
2018	Negeri Sembilan	19	(1)
2019	PDRM	19	(1)
2020–2022	Kuala Lumpur City	36	(2)
2023–2024	Melaka F.C.	0	(0)
2025–2026	Teck Hin F.C.	0	(0)

International career^{‡}
2016	Malaysia	2	(0)
- * Club domestic league appearances and goals as of 12 September 2022 ‡ National team caps and goals as of 17 November 2016

Mohd Fakrul Aiman bin Sidid (born 12 August 1989) is a Malaysian professional footballer who plays as a winger.

== Club career ==
=== PKNS (loan) ===
Fakrul joined PKNS on loan in August 2012 for the Malaysia Cup.

== International career ==
In August 2016, Fakrul Aiman was called up to the Malaysian national team for the matches against Indonesia. He made his debut for the senior team in the match as a 77th-minute substitute for Mohd Amri Yahyah, as Malaysia lost 3–0.

== Career statistics ==
=== Club ===
As of 12 September 2022

Appearances and goals by club, season and competition
Club	Season	League			Cup (Note: Malaysia FA Cup)		League Cup (Note: Includes Malaysia Cup and Malaysia Challenge Cup)		Continental		Total	
Club	Season	Division	Apps	Goals	Apps	Goals	Apps	Goals	Apps	Goals	Apps	Goals
DRB-Hicom	2015	Malaysia Premier League	0	4	0	0	0	0	–		0	0
DRB-Hicom	2016	Malaysia Premier League	0	0	0	0	0	0	–		0	0
DRB-Hicom	Total		0	0	0	0	0	0	–		0	0
PDRM	2016	Malaysia Super League	9	3	0	0	0	0	–		9	3
PDRM	Total		9	3	0	0	0	0	–		9	3
Felda United	2017	Malaysia Super League	8	0	1	0	1	0	3 (Note: Appearance(s) in AFC Cup)	0	13	0
Felda United	Total		8	0	1	0	1	0	3	0	13	0
Negeri Sembilan	2018	Malaysia Super League	19	1	0	0	6	2	–		25	3
Negeri Sembilan	Total		19	1	0	0	6	2	–	–	25	3
PDRM	2019	Malaysia Premier League	19	1	2	0	1	0	–		22	1
PDRM	Total		19	1	2	0	1	0	–	–	22	1
Kuala Lumpur City	2020	Malaysia Premier League	11	2	–						11	2
Kuala Lumpur City	2021	Malaysia Super League	13	0	–		0	0	–		13	0
Kuala Lumpur City	2022	Malaysia Super League	12	0	2	2	1	0	3	1	18	3
Kuala Lumpur City	Total		36	2	2	2	1	0	3	1	42	5
Career total			0	0	0	0	0	0	–	–	0	0

=== International ===
As of 11 October 2016

Malaysia
Year	Apps	Goals
2016	2	0
Total	2	0

== Honour ==
=== Club ===
Kuala Lumpur City

- Malaysia Cup: 2021
- AFC Cup runner-up: 2022
