= Gonzalo Cabrera =

Argentine footballer (born 1989)

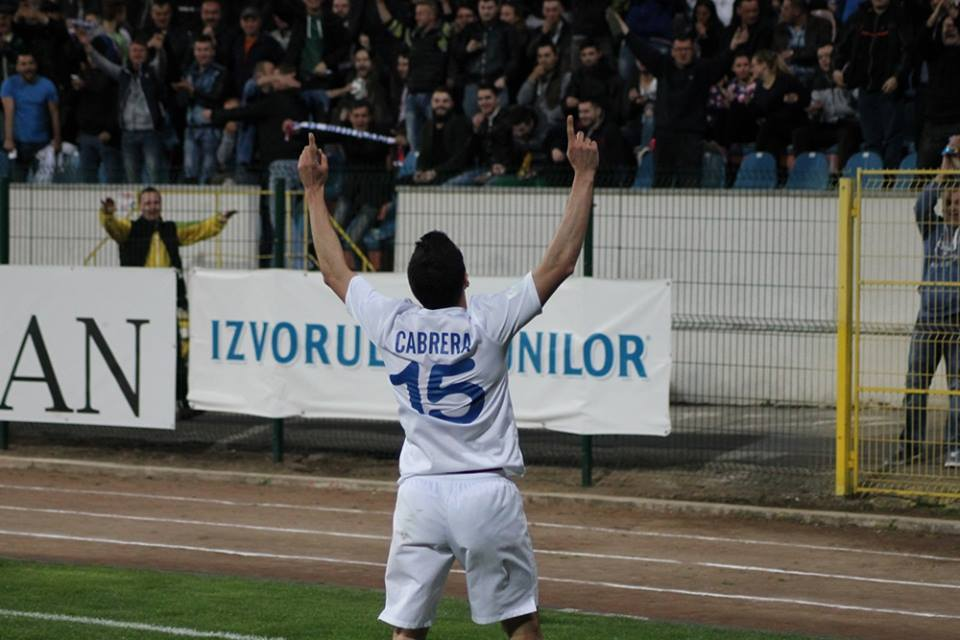
- Cabrera with Botoșani in 2016

Personal information
- Full name: Gonzalo Gabriel Cabrera Giordano
- Date of birth: 15 January 1989 (age 37)
- Place of birth: Buenos Aires, Argentina
- Height: 1.69 m (5 ft 6 1/2 in)
- Positions: Winger; striker

Youth career
- Boca Juniors

Senior career*
Years	Team	Apps	(Gls)
2007–2011	Boca Juniors	0	(0)
2010	→ Deportivo Cali (loan)	0	(0)
2010	→ Doxa Katokopias (loan)	18	(3)
2011	→ AEK Larnaca (loan)	12	(1)
2011–2014	Godoy Cruz Antonio Tomba	32	(1)
2012–2013	→ Once Caldas (loan)	38	(6)
2015	Defensa y Justicia	4	(1)
2015–2016	Botoșani	37	(11)
2016–2018	Al-Faisaly	15	(2)
2017	→ Johor Darul Ta'zim (loan)	21	(11)
2018–2021	Johor Darul Ta'zim	69	(32)
Total		246	(68)
- * Club domestic league appearances and goals as of 18 November 2021

Gonzalo Cabrera is an Argentine former professional footballer. He plays on the left wing and is also capable of being a striker. He also holds Iraqi citizenship.

== Career ==
Cabrera was born in Buenos Aires, where he made his first football steps in the academy of Boca Juniors.

He began his senior career at Boca Juniors in 2007, but failed to make a league appearance during his four years at the club. During this time he also spent time on loan at Deportivo Cali, Doxa Katokopias and AEK Larnaca, making a combined total of 30 league appearances and scoring 4 goals.

In July 2011 he joined Godoy Cruz Antonio Tomba, making 32 league appearances. During this time he also spent time on loan at Once Caldas, making 38 league appearances and scoring 6 goals.

In 2015 he joined Defensa y Justicia, making 4 league appearances and scoring one goal. In July 2015 he joined Botoșani, making 37 league appearances and scoring 11 goals. Cabrera's spell at Botoșani didn't last long and in July 2016 he joined Al-Faisaly, making 15 league appearances and scoring 2 goals in two years. During this time he also spent time on loan at Johor Darul Ta'zim. Cabrera was an influential player for the Johor Darul Ta'zim in their first season, scoring 19 goals and contributing another five assists. In the 2017 Super League season, he played under an Argentine passport. However, in the following season, he signed for JDT as an Asian player with an Iraqi passport.

== Honours ==
Johor Darul Ta'zim

- Malaysia Super League: 2017, 2018, 2019, 2020, 2021
- Malaysia Cup: 2017, 2019
- Malaysia Charity Shield: 2018, 2019, 2020, 2021

Individual

- Liga I Player of the Month: May 2016
