= Syazwan Tajudin =

Malaysian footballer

Personal information
- Full name: Muhammad Syazwan bin Tajudin
- Date of birth: 7 January 1994 (age 32)
- Place of birth: Kedah, Malaysia
- Height: 1.81 m (5 ft 11 1/2 in)
- Positions: Defender; midfielder

Team information
- Current team: Perlis United
- Number: 17

Youth career
- 2011, 2013: Harimau Muda B
- 2012: Harimau Muda A
- 2013–2014: Kedah U21

Senior career*
Years	Team	Apps	(Gls)
2014–2019	Kedah	34	(0)
2020	Kuala Lumpur	1	(0)
2021–2022	Kedah Darul Aman	1	(0)
2023	BRM Kuala Kangsar		
2023–	Perlis United	1	(0)
- * Club domestic league appearances and goals as of 23 July 2023

Muhammad Syazwan bin Tajudin (born 7 January 1994 in Kedah) is a Malaysian footballer who mainly operates as defender for Perlis United.

Owing to injury sustained in a match against Johor Darul Ta'zim, Syazwan unable to play the remainder of the 2016 Malaysia Super League from April 30.

== Career statistics ==
=== Club ===
As of 12 March 2022

Club	Season	League		Cup		League Cup		Continental		Total	
Club	Season	Apps	Goals	Apps	Goals	Apps	Goals	Apps	Goals	Apps	Goals
Harimau Muda B	2011	18	0	0	0	0	0	–	–	18	0
Harimau Muda B	2013	15	1	1	0	0	0	–	–	16	1
Harimau Muda B	Total	33	1	1	0	0	0	0	0	34	1
Harimau Muda A	2012	5	0	0	0	0	0	–	–	5	0
Harimau Muda A	Total	5	0	0	0	0	0	0	0	5	0
Kedah	2014	0	0	0	0	0	0	–	–	0	0
Kedah	2015	7	0	0	0	0	0	–	–	7	0
Kedah	2016	6	0	4	0	0	0	–	–	10	0
Kedah	2017	8	0	6	0	4	0	–	–	18	0
Kedah	2018	12	0	1	0	0	0	–	–	13	0
Kedah	2019	1	0	1	0	0	0	–	–	2	0
Kedah	Total	34	0	12	0	4	0	0	0	50	0
Kuala Lumpur FA	2020	1	0	0	0	0	0	–	–	1	0
Kuala Lumpur FA	Total	1	0	0	0	0	0	0	0	1	0
Kedah	2021	1	0	0	0	0	0	–	–	1	0
Kedah	2022	0	0	1	0	0	0	0	0	1	0
Kedah	Total	1	0	1	0	0	0	0	0	2	0
Career total		74	1	14	0	4	0	0	0	92	1

== Honours ==
=== Club ===
Kedah

- Malaysian FA Cup: 2017, 2019
- Malaysia Premier League: 2015
- Malaysia Cup: 2016
- Malaysia Charity Shield: 2017
