= Leandro Velázquez =

Argentine footballer

Personal information
- Full name: Leandro Sebastián Velázquez
- Date of birth: 10 May 1989 (age 37)
- Place of birth: Buenos Aires, Argentina
- Height: 1.68 m (5 ft 6 in)
- Position: Attacking midfielder

Youth career
- Vélez Sársfield

Senior career*
| Years | Team | Apps | (Gls) |
| 2008–2014 | Vélez Sársfield | 45 | (3) |
| 2010–2011 | → Newell's Old Boys (loan) | 14 | (1) |
| 2012–2013 | → San Martín de San Juan (loan) | 14 | (0) |
| 2014 | Independiente Rivadavia | 14 | (1) |
| 2015 | Johor Darul Ta'zim II | 29 | (16) |
| 2015 | → Johor Darul Ta'zim (loan) | 2 | (1) |
| 2016 | Deportivo Pasto | 34 | (5) |
| 2016–2018 | Veracruz | 16 | (1) |
| 2018–2019 | Rionegro Águilas | 18 | (3) |
| 2019–2023 | Johor Darul Ta'zim | 77 | (25) |

International career^{‡}
| 2009 | Argentina U20 | 9 | (1) |
- * Club domestic league appearances and goals as of 29 July 2023 ‡ National team caps and goals as of malaysia

Leandro Sebastián Velázquez (born 10 May 1989) is an Argentine professional footballer who last played as an attacking midfielder for Malaysia Super League club Johor Darul Ta'zim in 2023.

== Club career ==
=== Vélez Sársfield ===
Leandro made his league debut for Vélez Sársfield in the week before his 19th birthday. He played in a 1–1 draw with Racing on 4 April 2008. He scored his first goal against Estudiantes de La Plata in the Torneo Apertura 2008 and was part of the winning team in the Torneo Clausura 2009. Leandro entered the field during the last game against Huracán when Vélez needed a victory to become champion, and was replaced by Leandro Coronel immediately after the team scored the winning goal.

==== Loan to Newell's Old Boys ====
Leandro was loaned for the 2009–10 season to Newell's Old Boys.

=== Johor Darul Ta'zim ===
In October 2015, Leandro was called up in the starting eleven in the 2015 AFC Cup Final squad for Johor Darul Ta'zim, where he scored the winning goal in a 1–0 victory against Istiklol.

=== Deportivo Pasto ===
On 17 January 2016, Leandro left Johor Darul Ta'zim and joined Deportivo Pasto with free transfer fee.

=== Return to Johor Darul Ta;zim ===
On 21 February 2019, Johor Darul Ta'zim confirm the return signing of Velazquez in the Johor Darul Ta'zim squad. On 30 April 2022, during the last fixture of the 2022 AFC Champions League group stage, he scored a free kick against 2021 K League 1 runners-up, Ulsan Hyundai which ended up with Johor progressing as group winners to the Round of 16.

== International career ==
In January 2009, Leandro was selected to join the Argentina U20 squad for the 2009 South American Youth Championship in Venezuela. However, His team failed to qualify for the FIFA U-20 World Cup.

Having played in Malaysia since 2019, there is a possibility of Velázquez being naturalized as a Malaysian citizen in the future, thus enabling him to play for the Malaysia national team.

== Honours ==
=== Club ===
Vélez Sársfield

- Argentine Primera División: 2009 Clausura

Johor Darul Ta'zim

- AFC Cup: 2015
- Malaysia Super League: 2019, 2020, 2021, 2022, 2023
- Malaysia Cup: 2019, 2022, 2023
- Piala Sumbangsih: 2020, 2021, 2022, 2023
- Malaysia FA Cup: 2022, 2023
