= 2019 Malaysia Cup =

Piala Malaysia 2019

Tournament details
- Country: Malaysia
- Dates: 2 August – 2 November 2019
- Teams: 16

Final positions
- Champions: Johor Darul Ta'zim (2nd title)
- Runners-up: Kedah

Tournament statistics
- Matches played: 61
- Goals scored: 209 (3.43 per match)
- Top goal scorer(s): Safawi Rasid (11 goals)

Awards
- Best player: Safawi Rasid

The 2019 Malaysia Cup (Malay: Piala Malaysia 2019) was the 93rd edition of Malaysia Cup tournament organised by Football Association of Malaysia (FAM) and Malaysian Football League (MFL).

The 2019 Malaysia Cup began on August with a preliminary round. A total of 16 teams took part in the competition. The teams were divided into four groups, each containing four teams. The group leaders and runners-up teams in the groups after six matches qualified to the quarterfinals.

Perak were the defending champions, but they were eliminated by Selangor in the quarter-finals.

== Format ==
In the competition, the top eleven teams from the 2019 Malaysia Super League were joined by the top five teams from the 2019 Malaysia Premier League. The teams were drawn into four groups of four teams.

== Round and draw dates ==
The draw for the 2019 Malaysia Cup will be held on 22 July 2019 in Damansara Performing Arts Centre (DPAC) in Petaling Jaya.

Phase	Round	Draw date	First leg	Second leg
Group stage	Matchday 1	22 July 2019; 11:00 UTC+8	2–4 August 2019	
Group stage	Matchday 2	22 July 2019; 11:00 UTC+8	7–8 August 2019	
Group stage	Matchday 3	22 July 2019; 11:00 UTC+8	16–18 August 2019	
Group stage	Matchday 4	22 July 2019; 11:00 UTC+8	20–21 & 23–25 August 2019	
Group stage	Matchday 5	22 July 2019; 11:00 UTC+8	13–14 September 2019	
Group stage	Matchday 6	22 July 2019; 11:00 UTC+8	17–18 & 22 September 2019	
Knockout stage	Quarter-finals	22 July 2019; 11:00 UTC+8	21–22 & 25 September 2019	28–29 September 2019
Knockout stage	Semi-finals	22 July 2019; 11:00 UTC+8	19 October 2019	26 October 2019
Knockout stage	Final	22 July 2019; 11:00 UTC+8	2 November 2019 at Bukit Jalil National Stadium, Kuala Lumpur	

== Seeding ==
Pot 1	Pot 2	Pot 3	Pot 4
1. Johor Darul Ta'zim; 2. Pahang; 3. Selangor; 4. Kedah	5. Perak; 6. Melaka United; 7. Terengganu; 8. Petaling Jaya City	9. PKNS; 10. FELDA United; 11. PKNP; 12. Sabah	13. PDRM; 14. UiTM; 15. Negeri Sembilan; 16. Pulau Pinang

== Group stage ==
The draw for the group stage was held on 22 July 2019 at the Damansara Performing Arts Centre (DPAC) in Petaling Jaya. The 16 teams were drawn into four groups of four. For the draw, the teams were seeded into four pots based on the following principles (introduced starting this season):

- Pot 1, 2 and 3 contained the 11 top teams from 2019 Super League, seeded based on their final standings or end placements in the league.
- Pot 3 and 4 contained the 5 top teams from 2019 Premier League, seeded based on their final standings or end placements in the league.

In each group, teams played against each other home-and-away in a round-robin format. The group winners and runners-up advanced to the quarter-finals. The matchdays were 2–4 August, 7–8 August, 16–18 August, 20–21 & 23–25 August, 13–14 September, and 17–18 & 22 September 2019.

=== Group A ===
Pos	Team	Pld	W	D	L	GF	GA	GD	Pts	Qualification	KED	TER	NSE	PKNS
1	Kedah	6	4	1	1	14	10	+4	13	Advance to knockout stage	—	0–2	4–2	3–2
2	Terengganu	6	4	0	2	14	8	+6	12	Advance to knockout stage	2–3	—	3–1	3–1
3	Negeri Sembilan	6	2	0	4	11	15	−4	6		1–3	3–2	—	1–2
4	PKNS	6	1	1	4	7	13	−6	4		1–1	0–2	1–3	—

Source: FAM MFL

=== Group B ===
Pos	Team	Pld	W	D	L	GF	GA	GD	Pts	Qualification	JDT	PKNP	PJC	UiTM
1	Johor Darul Ta'zim	6	5	1	0	19	8	+11	16	Advance to knockout stage	—	5–0	4–2	3–1
2	PKNP	6	3	1	2	12	9	+3	10	Advance to knockout stage	2–2	—	3–0	4–0
3	Petaling Jaya City	6	3	0	3	9	11	−2	9		2–3	2–1	—	1–0
4	UiTM	6	0	0	6	2	14	−12	0		1–2	0–2	0–2	—

Source: FAM MFL

=== Group C ===
Pos	Team	Pld	W	D	L	GF	GA	GD	Pts	Qualification	PAH	PRK	PEN	SAB
1	Pahang	6	5	0	1	12	5	+7	15	Advance to knockout stage	—	3–0	3–1	1–0
2	Perak	6	2	3	1	9	7	+2	9	Advance to knockout stage	3–1	—	1–1	3–0
3	Penang	6	1	2	3	5	10	−5	5		0–2	1–1	—	2–1
4	Sabah	6	1	1	4	5	9	−4	4		1–2	1–1	2–0	—

Source: FAM MFL

=== Group D ===
Pos	Team	Pld	W	D	L	GF	GA	GD	Pts	Qualification	SEL	MEL	FEL	PDRM
1	Selangor	6	2	4	0	9	6	+3	10	Advance to knockout stage	—	1–1	2–2	1–1
2	Melaka United	6	2	2	2	10	9	+1	8	Advance to knockout stage	0–1	—	1–3	3–1
3	FELDA United	6	2	1	3	10	12	−2	7		0–2	1–3	—	1–0
4	PDRM	6	1	3	2	10	12	−2	6		2–2	2–2	4–3	—

Source: FAM MFL

== Knockout stage ==
In the knockout stage, teams played against each other over two legs on a home-and-away basis, except for the one-match final. The mechanism of the draws for each round was as follows:

- In the draw for the quarter final, the fourth group winners were seeded, and the fourth group runners-up were unseeded. The seeded teams were drawn against the unseeded teams, with the seeded teams hosting the second leg. Teams from the same group or the same association could not be drawn against each other.
- In the draws for the quarter-finals onwards, there were no seedings, and teams from the same group or the same association could be drawn against each other.

=== Bracket ===
Quarter-finals
B2	PKNP	1	1	2
A1	Kedah	2	4	6
D2	Melaka United	0	1	1
C1	Pahang	3	3	6
A2	Terengganu	0	1	1
B1	Johor Darul Ta'zim	1	4	5
C2	Perak	1	1	2
D1	Selangor	0	3	3

Semi-finals
Kedah (a)	3	5	8
Pahang	3	5	8
Johor Darul Ta'zim	2	3	5
Selangor	1	0	1

Final
Kedah	0
Johor Darul Ta'zim	3

=== Quarter-finals ===
The first legs were played on 21, 22 and 25 September, and the second legs were played on 28 and 29 September 2019.

Team 1	Agg.	Team 2	1st leg	2nd leg
Terengganu	1–5	Johor Darul Ta'zim	0–1	1–4
Melaka United	1–6	Pahang	0–3	1–3
Perak	2–3	Selangor	1–0	1–3
PKNP	2–6	Kedah	1–2	1–4

=== Semi-finals ===
The first legs were played on 19 October, and the second legs were played on 26 October 2019.

Team 1	Agg.	Team 2	1st leg	2nd leg
Kedah	8–8 (a)	Pahang	3–3	5–5 (a.e.t.)
Johor Darul Ta'zim	5–1	Selangor	2–1	3–0

=== Final ===
The final was played on 2 November 2019 at the Bukit Jalil National Stadium in Kuala Lumpur.

2 November 2019
21:00 UTC+8

Kedah	0–3	Johor Darul Ta'zim
	Report	Velázquez 27'; Safawi 35'; Syafiq 58'

Bukit Jalil National Stadium, Bukit Jalil
Attendance: 83,420
Referee: Nazmi Nasaruddin

== Statistics ==
=== Goalscorers ===
As of 3 November 2019

Players sorted first by goals scored, then by first name.

Rank	Player	Club	Goals
1	(Malaysia) Safawi Rasid	Johor Darul Ta'zim	11
2	(Nigeria) Dickson Nwakaeme	Pahang	9
3	(Spain) Fernando Rodríguez	Kedah	8
4	(Namibia) Lazarus Kaimbi	Pahang	7
5	(Brazil) Diogo	Johor Darul Ta'zim	6
5	(Iraq) Gonzalo Cabrera	Johor Darul Ta'zim	6
5	(Argentina) Jonatan Bauman	Kedah	6
5	(Ivory Coast) Kipré Tchétché	Terengganu	6
9	(Brazil) Igor Carioca	Negeri Sembilan	5
9	(Malaysia) Ferris Danial	Negeri Sembilan	5

=== Hat-tricks ===
Player	For	Against	Result	Date
(Ivory Coast) Kipré Tchétché	Terengganu	Negeri Sembilan	3–1	17 August 2019
(Brazil) Giancarlo	PKNP	UiTM	4–1	13 September 2019
(Malaysia) Safawi Rasid	Johor Darul Ta'zim	Selangor	3–0	26 October 2019

== See also ==
- 2019 Malaysia FA Cup
- 2019 Malaysia Challenge Cup
