= Safawi Rasid =

Malaysian footballer

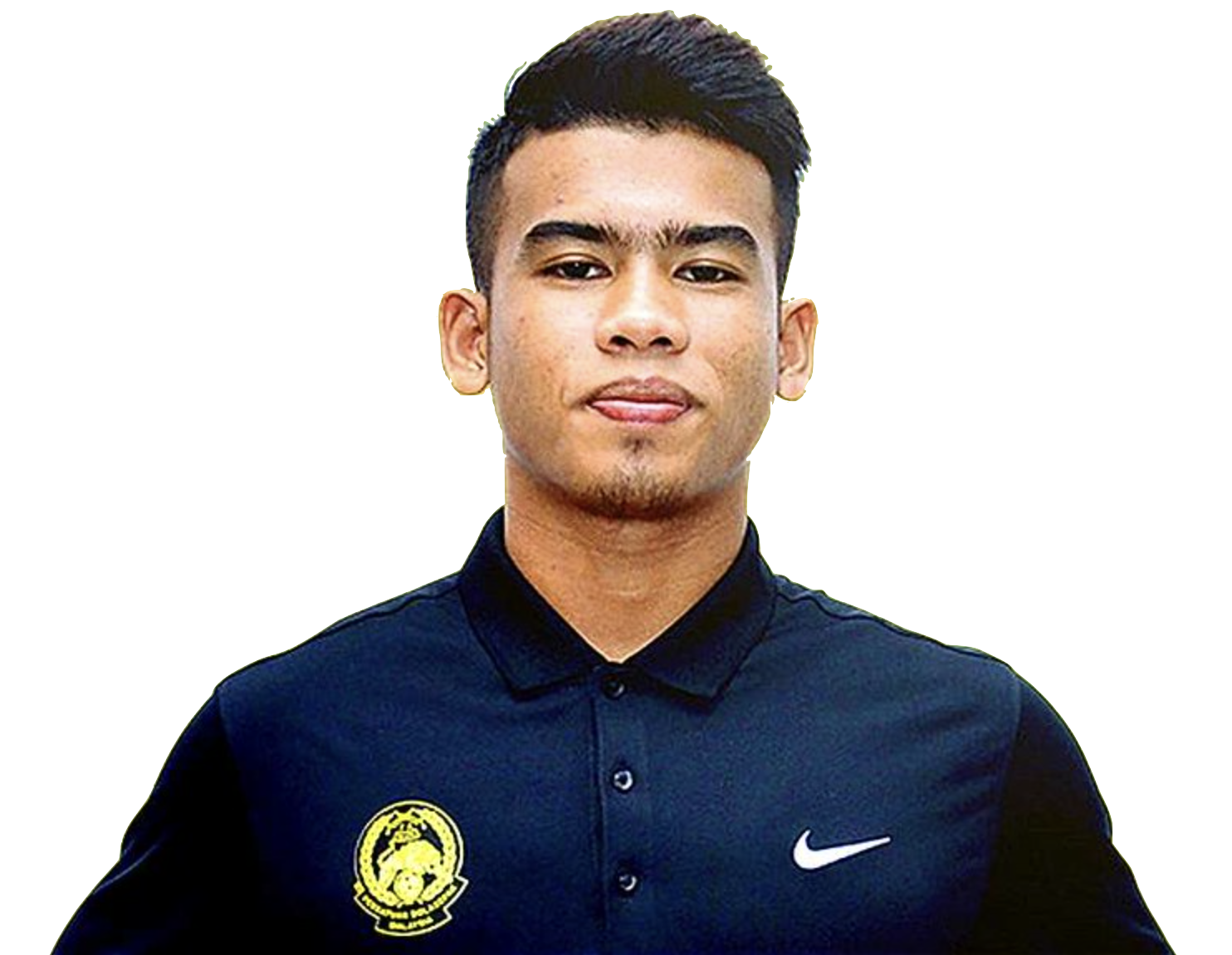

Personal information
- Full name: Muhammad Safawi bin Rasid
- Date of birth: 5 March 1997 (age 29)
- Place of birth: Dungun, Terengganu, Malaysia
- Height: 1.73 m (5 ft 8 in)
- Positions: Winger; attacking midfielder

Team information
- Current team: Kuching City (on loan from Johor Darul Ta'zim)
- Number: 29

Youth career
- 2014: T-Team

Senior career*
Years	Team	Apps	(Gls)
2014–2016	T-Team	35	(3)
2017–	Johor Darul Ta'zim	88	(27)
2020	→ Portimonense 'B' (loan)	1	(0)
2023	→ Ratchaburi (loan)	13	(1)
2024–2025	→ Terengganu (loan)	22	(7)
2025–2026	→ Kuala Lumpur City (loan)	23	(12)
2026–	→ Kuching City (loan)	0	(0)

International career^{‡}
2016	Malaysia U19	7	(7)
2016–2019	Malaysia U23	36	(11)
2016–	Malaysia	75	(22)
Medal record
Men's football
Representing Malaysia
AFF Championship
Runner-up	2018
Sea Games
Silver medal – second place	Sea Games 2017	Football
- * Club domestic league appearances and goals as of 1 July 2026 ‡ National team caps and goals as of 31 March 2026

Muhammad Safawi bin Rasid (born 5 March 1997) is a Malaysian professional footballer who plays as a winger or attacking midfielder for Malaysia Super League club Kuching City, on loan from Johor Darul Ta'zim, and the Malaysia national team. He is also affectionately known as Pawi by his teammates and fans.

== Early life ==
Safawi lives in Kampung Bukit Chatak, Dungun and attended school at Sekolah Menengah Kebangsaan Seri Dungun, Dungun, Terengganu in 2010 before moving to Sekolah Sukan Bukit Nenas, Setiu, Terengganu to improve his football talent until 2014. He had played football for his school team since his first year of being a secondary school.

Safawi has 13 siblings, and most of them are involved with sports such as sepak takraw, football, and hockey. His two younger brothers, Syakir, played for Terengganu III, and Alfi, played for Kedah.

He is the ninth sibling and the pride of the Dungun people.

== Club career ==
=== Youth career ===
By 2011, T-Team had established a football academy all over six Terengganu cities, Dungun, Marang, Besut, Kemaman, Setiu and Kuala Terengganu by their 2011 head coach, Jibang Marzuki. All the football academy players must be below 18 years old, and Jibang Marzuki managed to hold a game for each team every week to ensure the best performance before going to T-Team Football Club pre-selection at the end of the year.

Safawi, who was only 15 years old when he joined the Dungun T-Team Football Club Academy, always made the first-eleven for his team every game. He used to play as a central midfielder and loved scoring long-range shots with his left foot. His manager at the time recalled going to his house and forcing him to attend training, as he believed that Safawi had a bright future ahead. Since then, Safawi represented Terengganu's football team each year for the MSSM tournament.

When he was 16 years old, he moved to Sekolah Sukan Bukit Nenas to improve his football skills, 66 kilometres away from home. Due to his fantastic talent at the Sports School League, T-Team coach, Rahmad Darmawan selected him to attend training with the first team. Safawi quickly impressed Rahmad and soon became an integral part of the first team.

=== T-Team ===
At the age of 17, Safawi made his professional debut in the 2014 Malaysia Cup against Selangor on 13 August 2014.

=== Johor Darul Ta'zim ===
In December 2016, it was announced that Safawi had agreed to sign with champions Johor Darul Ta'zim. He was assigned to the number 29.

==== 2017 season ====
On 7 February 2017, Safawi featured in the 2017 AFC Champions League qualifying play-offs against Gamba Osaka which his side lost 0–3. On 27 January 2017, Safawi made his league debut in a 3–1 win over Felda United after coming off from the bench.

On 15 July 2017, he scored his first goal in the Malaysian Super League for his new club in a 3–1 victory against Sarawak. At the end of the season, Safawi picked up his first Malaysia Super League and 2017 Malaysia Cup medal, helping Johor Darul Ta'zim win their 4th consecutive league title and first Malaysia Cup in their history.

==== 2018 season ====
During the 2018 AFC Cup group stage, Safawi showed an impressive performance in a 3–0 victory over Persija Jakarta, scoring a stunner along the way. On 17 March, he scored his first hat-trick in a 2–3 victory in the third round of the 2018 Malaysia FA Cup against UiTM. On 14 April 2018, he scored his first goal of the Malaysian Super League season against PKNS.

==== 2019 season ====
During the 2019 AFC Champions League group stages, Safawi scored a curler goal against Chinese club Shandong Luneng that made him win the AFC 'Goal of the Decade'.

=== Portimonense (loan) ===
Safawi joined Portuguese Primeira Liga club Portimonense from Johor Darul Ta'zim on a season-long loan. He made his debut for the U-23 side on 16 October 2020, which ended in a 3–1 loss against Sporting CP U23. The loan was cut short at the end of December 2020 because of lack of playing time given by the coach, making Safawi leave without any first-team appearances.

==== 2021 season ====
During the opening match of the 2021 Malaysia Super League against Kedah during the Piala Sumbangsih on 5 March, he scored his goal for the club after returning from a loan spell in Portugal. However, in the next match against UiTM, Safawi injured his knee, keeping him out for three months.

==== 2022 season ====
Safawi went on to score 4 goals and contribute 6 assists in 26 appearances in the 2022 season, including a crucial assist to Bergson, where he went on to score the first goal in a 2–1 win against Korean club Ulsan Hyundai in the 2022 AFC Champions League group stage match.

=== Ratchaburi (loan) ===
On 4 December 2022, Ratchaburi chairman Tanawat Nitikanchana announced that the club had signed Safawi during the 2022–23 Thai League 1 transfer window. He made his debut for the team on 21 January 2023, which ended in a 2–0 lost against Khon Kaen United. On 19 March, in his 9th appearance in the league, Safawi netted his first goal in the Thai League 1 during the 2–1 win against Chonburi.

=== Terengganu (loan) ===
On 12 February 2024, it was announced that Safawi had agreed to sign with Terengganu on loan ahead of the 2024–25 season. Safawi went on to have a good record with Terengganu, scoring 18 goals and contributing 4 assists in 36 appearances for the club in all competitions played.

=== Kuala Lumpur City (loan) ===
On 2 July 2025, Safawi officially signed for Kuala Lumpur City on a loan move.

He was praised by pundits for his return to form while at the club, with Safawi scoring 6 goals and notching 2 assists in 11 games by the end of 2025. By 23 February 2026, Safawi hit double figures after scoring a brace in a 4–0 thrashing against Bruneian team DPMM, helping KL City rise to third in the league table. During the next gameweek, a late 95th-minute strike by Safawi in a narrow 2–1 win against Melaka enabled KL City to surge up to second place in the Malaysia Super League, behind Johor Darul Ta'zim.

At the end of his loan spell, Safawi became the league's top local goalscorer, with 13 goals scored in 23 matches. He was also the third-joint top goalscorer, tied with Ronald Ngah and Jairo, and behind Chrigor and Bergson.

=== Kuching City (loan) ===
Owing to Kuching City's historic qualification for the AFC Champions League Two and the ASEAN Club Championship, on 4 July 2026, Safawi signed for Kuching City along with his Johor Darul Ta'zim teammate Nazmi Faiz in order to bolster the club's preparations for continental competition.

== International career ==
=== Junior ===
Safawi made his debut for the Malaysia under-22 team in the 2016 Nations Cup.

=== Senior ===
In August 2016, Safawi was called up to the Malaysian national team for the match against Indonesia. He made his debut for the senior team in the match as a starter, as Malaysia lost 0–3. He was then called up again for the 2016 Causeway Challenge against rivals, Singapore, which ended 0–0.

Before the start of the 2016 AFF Suzuki Cup, Safawi was omitted from the final 23-man squad. The omission of Safawi from Ong Kim Swee was heavily criticized by Malaysian football fans despite veteran striker, Safee Sali managing to be in the squad despite having a poor season earlier with Johor Darul Ta'zim.

During the 2017 Southeast Asian Games, Safawi was selected for the 20-man squad by Ong Kim Swee. He scored the first goal of the tournament with a stunning volley from a cross by his fellow countryman Matthew Davies in a 2–1 victory against Brunei. Safawi scored his second goal of the tournament during the 3–1 victory against Myanmar. Despite receiving the silver medal after losing 1–0 during the final against Thailand, Safawi was one of the best players of the tournament and showed consistent performances throughout the tournament.

On 10 November 2017 Safawi scored his first international goal in the 2019 AFC Asian Cup qualification against North Korea.

During the 2018 Asian Games in Jakarta-Palembang, Indonesia. Safawi was also selected for the 20-man squad by Ong Kim Swee. On 17 August, when Malaysia was playing against South Korea, he scored twice to secure a 2–1 win in their second group match.

In November 2018, Safawi was called up to the Malaysia national squad for the 2018 AFF Championship. Safawi scored one goal in the tournament, against Vietnam in the final first leg.

On 9 December 2021, he scored his first international hat-trick in a 4–0 win over Laos in the 2020 AFF Championship group stage at the Bishan Stadium.

Safawi is also part of the Malaysian team that qualified for the 2023 AFC Asian Cup. He played all 3 matches against Turkmenistan, Bahrain and Bangladesh in Third Round Group E Qualification, scoring a goal against Turkmenistan and Bangladesh.

On 15 January 2024, Safawi came on as a substitute during the 2023 AFC Asian Cup match against Jordan.

== Career statistics ==
=== Club ===
As of match played 22 September 2025

Appearances and goals by club, season and competition
Club	Season	League			National cup (Note: Includes Malaysia FA Cup, Taça da Liga)		League cup (Note: Includes Malaysia Cup, Taça de Portugal)		Other (Note: Includes AFC Champions League, AFC Cup, ASEAN Club Championship, and Piala Sumbangsih)		Total	
Club	Season	Division	Apps	Goals	Apps	Goals	Apps	Goals	Apps	Goals	Apps	Goals
T-Team	2014	Malaysia Super League	—		—		6	0	—		6	0
T-Team	2015	Malaysia Premier League	15	1	2	1	0	0	—		17	2
T-Team	2016	Malaysia Super League	20	2	1	1	9	1	—		30	4
T-Team	Total		35	3	3	2	15	1	—		53	6
Johor Darul Ta'zim	2017	Malaysia Super League	7	1	1	0	7	1	6	1	21	3
Johor Darul Ta'zim	2018	Malaysia Super League	21	6	4	3	6	4	5	3	36	16
Johor Darul Ta'zim	2019	Malaysia Super League	21	8	1	0	10	11	5	1	37	20
Johor Darul Ta'zim	2020	Malaysia Super League	7	7	0	0	0	0	2	1	9	8
Johor Darul Ta'zim	2021	Malaysia Super League	17	3	–		10	1	3	0	30	4
Johor Darul Ta'zim	2022	Malaysia Super League	13	2	3	0	3	1	7 (Note: 6 AFC Champions League appearances and 1 Piala Sumbangsih appearances)	0	26	3
Johor Darul Ta'zim	2023	Malaysia Super League	2	0	0	0	1	0	0	0	3	0
Johor Darul Ta'zim	Total		88	27	9	3	37	18	28	6	162	54
Portimonense (loan)	2020-21	Primeira Liga	0	0	0	0	0	0	—		0	0
Ratchaburi (loan)	2022–23	Thai League 1	13	1	0	0	0	0	—		13	1
Terengganu FC (loan)	2024–25	Malaysia Super League	22	7	5	3	4	3	5	5	36	18
Kuala Lumpur City (loan)	2025–26	Malaysia Super League	22	13	2	0	6	1	0	0	30	14
Career total			180	51	19	8	62	23	33	11	294	93

=== International ===
As of 11 June 2024

Appearances and goals by national team and year
National team	Year	Apps	Goals
Malaysia	2016	3	0
Malaysia	2017	3	2
Malaysia	2018	11	2
Malaysia	2019	10	6
Malaysia	2021	8	5
Malaysia	2022	14	3
Malaysia	2023	9	2
Malaysia	2024	8	2
Malaysia	2025	3	0
Total		69	22

Scores and results list Malaysia's goal tally first, score column indicates score after each Safawi Rasid goal.

List of international goals scored by Safawi Rasid
No.	Date	Venue	Opponent	Score	Result	Competition
1	10 November 2017	New I-Mobile Stadium, Buriram, Thailand	North Korea	1–4	1–4	2019 AFC Asian Cup qualification
2	13 November 2017	New I-Mobile Stadium, Buriram, Thailand	North Korea	1–4	1–4	2019 AFC Asian Cup qualification
3	3 November 2018	Bukit Jalil National Stadium, Kuala Lumpur, Malaysia	Maldives	2–0	3–0	Friendly
4	11 December 2018	Bukit Jalil National Stadium, Kuala Lumpur, Malaysia	Vietnam	2–2	2–2	2018 AFF Championship
5	2 June 2019	Bukit Jalil National Stadium, Kuala Lumpur, Malaysia	Nepal	1–0	2–0	Friendly
6	7 June 2019	Bukit Jalil National Stadium, Kuala Lumpur, Malaysia	Timor-Leste	4–0	7–1	2022 FIFA World Cup qualification
7	7 June 2019	Bukit Jalil National Stadium, Kuala Lumpur, Malaysia	Timor-Leste	5–1	7–1	2022 FIFA World Cup qualification
8	9 November 2019	Bukit Jalil National Stadium, Kuala Lumpur, Malaysia	Tajikistan	1–0	1–0	Friendly
9	19 November 2019	Bukit Jalil National Stadium, Kuala Lumpur, Malaysia	Indonesia	1–0	2–0	2022 FIFA World Cup qualification
10	19 November 2019	Bukit Jalil National Stadium, Kuala Lumpur, Malaysia	Indonesia	2–0	2–0	2022 FIFA World Cup qualification
11	15 June 2021	Al-Maktoum Stadium, Dubai, United Arab Emirates	Thailand	1–0	1–0	2022 FIFA World Cup qualification
12	6 December 2021	Bishan Stadium, Bishan, Singapore	Cambodia	1–0	3–1	2020 AFF Championship
13	9 December 2021	Bishan Stadium, Bishan, Singapore	Laos	1–0	4–0	2020 AFF Championship
14	9 December 2021	Bishan Stadium, Bishan, Singapore	Laos	2–0	4–0	2020 AFF Championship
15	9 December 2021	Bishan Stadium, Bishan, Singapore	Laos	4–0	4–0	2020 AFF Championship
16	1 June 2022	Bukit Jalil National Stadium, Kuala Lumpur, Malaysia	Hong Kong	1–0	2–0	Friendly
17	8 June 2022	Bukit Jalil National Stadium, Kuala Lumpur, Malaysia	Turkmenistan	1–0	3–1	2023 AFC Asian Cup qualification
18	14 June 2022	Bukit Jalil National Stadium, Kuala Lumpur, Malaysia	Bangladesh	1–0	4–1	2023 AFC Asian Cup qualification
19	14 June 2023	Sultan Mizan Zainal Abidin Stadium, Kuala Terengganu, Malaysia	Solomon Islands	3–1	4–1	Friendly
20	20 June 2023	Sultan Mizan Zainal Abidin Stadium, Kuala Terengganu, Malaysia	Papua New Guinea	1–0	10–0	Friendly
21	11 June 2024	Bukit Jalil National Stadium, Kuala Lumpur, Malaysia	Chinese Taipei	1–1	3–1	2026 FIFA World Cup qualification
22	4 September 2024	Bukit Jalil National Stadium, Kuala Lumpur, Malaysia	Philippines	2–1	2–1	2024 Pestabola Merdeka

== Honours ==
=== Club ===
==== Johor Darul Ta'zim ====
- Malaysia Super League: 2017, 2018, 2019, 2020, 2021, 2022, 2023
- Malaysia Cup: 2017, 2019, 2022, 2023, runner-up:2021
- Piala Sumbangsih: 2018, 2019, 2020, 2021, 2022, 2023
- Malaysia FA Cup: 2022, 2023

=== International ===
Malaysia U-23

- SEA Games: (silver) Silver 2017

Malaysia

- Pestabola Merdeka: 2024; runner-up 2023
- AFF Championship runner-up: 2018
- King's Cup runner-up: 2022

=== Individual ===
- AFF Championship Top Scorer: 2020
- AFC Champions League Goal Of The Decade: 2020
- Malaysia Cup Top Scorer: 2019 (11 goals)
- Malaysia Cup Best Player: 2019
- FourFourTwo ASEAN – Young Player of the Year: 2018
- FAM Football Awards – Most Promising Player: 2016, 2018
- FAM Football Awards – Best Eleven: 2018, 2019
- FAM Football Awards – Best Midfielder: 2018
- FAM Football Awards – Best Striker: 2019
- FAM Football Awards – Most Popular Player: 2019
- FAM Football Awards – Most Valuable Player: 2018, 2019
- Malaysia Super League Team of the Season: 2019
- 2018 AFF Championship: Best Eleven
- Thai League Dream ASEAN XI
- ASEAN Club Championship: Allstar XI 2024–25
