= Jonatan Bauman =

Argentine footballer

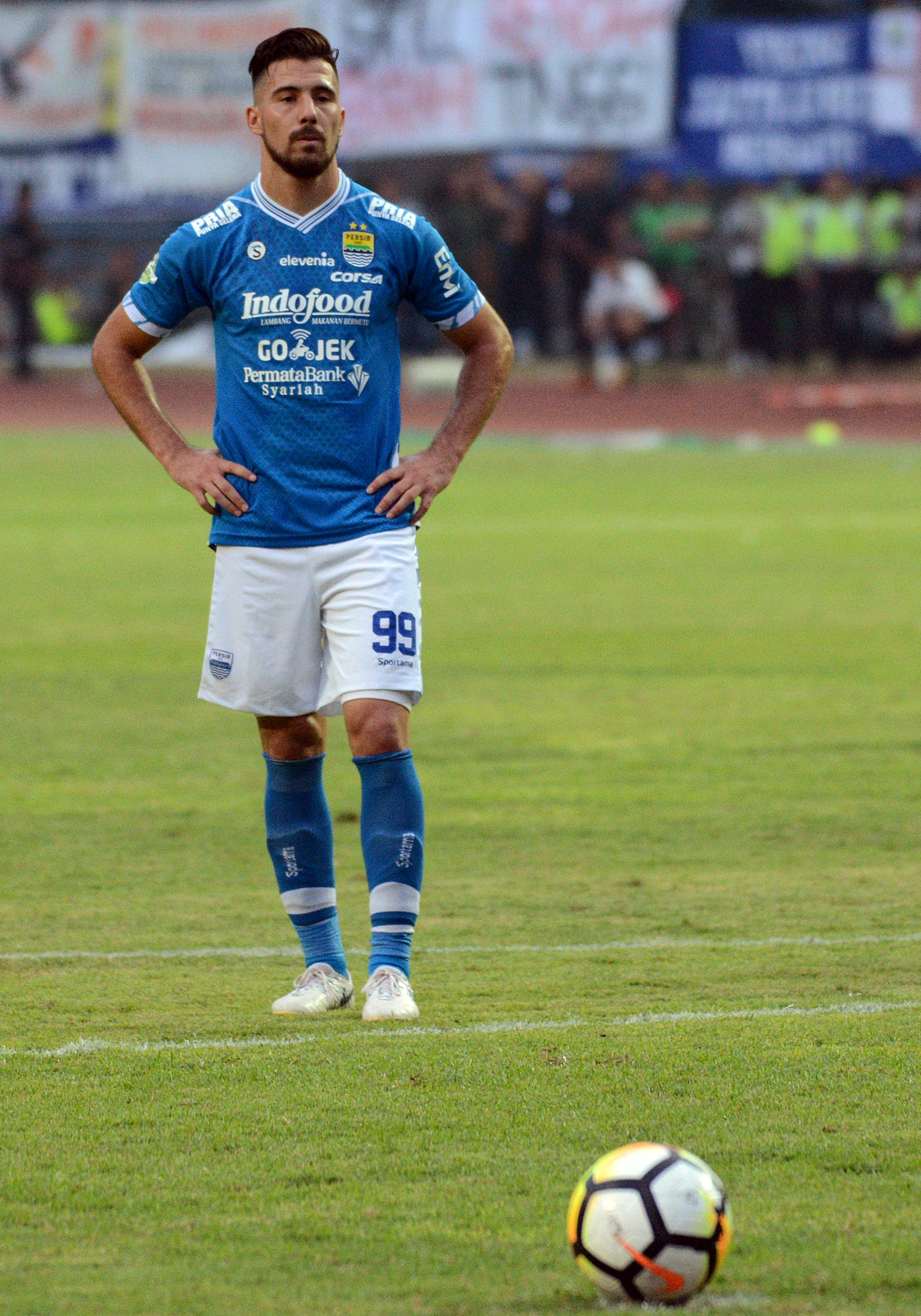
- Bauman with Persib Bandung in 2018

Personal information
- Full name: Jonatan Jesús Bauman
- Date of birth: 30 March 1991 (age 35)
- Place of birth: Sunchales, Argentina
- Height: 1.78 m (5 ft 10 in)
- Position: Forward

Team information
- Current team: Atlanta

Youth career
- Unión de Sunchales

Senior career*
Years	Team	Apps	(Gls)
2009–2012	Colón	13	(2)
2010–2011	→ Patronato (loan)	14	(0)
2011–2012	→ Deportivo Armenio (loan)	16	(3)
2013	Santiago Morning	12	(3)
2013–2014	Gimnasia de Jujuy	31	(5)
2014–2015	Tiro Federal	14	(7)
2015	Instituto	33	(6)
2016	Unión de Sunchales	10	(5)
2016–2017	Guillermo Brown	41	(8)
2017–2018	Kerkyra	9	(0)
2018–2019	Persib Bandung	26	(12)
2019–2020	Kedah Darul Aman	18	(6)
2020	Arema	2	(0)
2020–2021	Quilmes	8	(2)
2021–2022	Mushuc Runa	13	(12)
2021	→ Independiente del Valle (loan)	19	(14)
2022	Independiente del Valle	29	(6)
2023–2024	Barcelona SC	25	(2)
2024	Mushuc Runa	11	(1)
2024	Coquimbo Unido	11	(2)
2025–2026	Atlanta	15	(1)
2026–	ADT Tarma	8	(1)

International career
2009–2010	Argentina U20	2	(0)
- * Club domestic league appearances and goals as of 17:18, 20 July 2025 (UTC)

Jonatan Jesús Bauman (born 30 March 1991) is an Argentine professional football player who plays as a forward for Atlanta.

== Career ==
He debuted in Colón on 8 October 2009 against Arsenal de Sarandi. In his debut his team thrashed by 4 to 1 to his rival, and he was the assist of one of the goals. His position is forward, although he can also be delayed to midfielder.

In August 2011, it was loaned to a Paraná Board of Trustees for one year, who was a member of the First National B Bank. At the end of the contractual loan, he passes to Deportivo Armenio, club where he remains until the end of 2012. In January 2013, after negotiating his contractual status with Colón, owner of his pass, he crossed the mountain range to join the Santiago Morning club that played in Chile. The beginning of the 2013–2014 season finds him with the Gymnastics jersey of Jujuy in the First National B of his native country, where he did not have a good performance. At the beginning of 2015, he disembarked as a free signing at Instituto de Córdoba, where, despite not having a good goal average, he achieved a good performance being one of the main figures of the rojiblanco team. However, the CD of the institution left him free. At the beginning of 2016, he returned to the club that saw him born as a footballer, Union de Sunchales.

In the second half of 2024, Bauman moved to Chile and joined Coquimbo Unido.

=== International career ===
On 18 November 2009 Bauman, in a meeting with Germán Lerche and Antonio Mohamed, learned that he was summoned by Sergio Batista to work with the Youth Team. On 4 May 2010 Bauman received the news that he had been chosen by Sergio Batista as one of the 16 players sparring of the Argentina for the 2010 World Cup in South Africa.

== Honours ==
Unión Sunchales

- Copa Santa Fe: 2016

Kedah

- Malaysia FA Cup: 2019
- Malaysia Cup: runners-up 2019

Independiente del Valle

- Ecuadorian Serie A: 2021
- Copa Sudamericana: 2022

Individual

- Liga 1 Best XI: 2018
- Ecuadorian Serie A Top Goalscorer: 2021
