= 2024–25 Kedah Darul Aman F.C. season =

Kedah Darul Aman
2024–25 season
- Owner: Mohd Daud Bakar
- CEO: Mohamad Faidhi Mohd Rohdzi
- Head coach: Victor Andrag (Interim)
- Stadium: Darul Aman Stadium (Capacity: 32,387)
- Malaysia Super League: 11th
- Malaysia FA Cup: Semi-finals
- Malaysia Cup: Round of 16
- MFL Challenge Cup: Semi-finals
- Top goalscorer: League: Cleylton (4 goals); All: Ebenezer Assifuah (6 goals)
- Highest home attendance: 18,317; Kedah Darul Aman 1–2 Johor Darul Ta'zim (19 July 2024) (FA Cup)
- Lowest home attendance: 1,565; Kedah Darul Aman 1–0 Penang (League)

The 2024–25 season was Kedah Darul Aman's 16th season in the Malaysia Super League since the league's inception in 2004.

== Management team ==
Position	Name
Technical Director	(Chile) Nelson San Martin
Team coordinator	(Malaysia) Ahmad Fauzi Saari
Head coach	(Malaysia) Victor Andrag (Interim)
Goalkeeper coach	(Malaysia) Mohd Yazid Mohd Yassin
Assistant goalkeeper coach	(Malaysia) Abdul Hadi Abdul Hamid
Assistant goalkeeper coach	(Malaysia) Helmi Eliza Elias
Fitness coach	(Malaysia) Muhammad Afeeq Aqmal
Team doctor	(Malaysia) Jasminder Singh
Team doctor	(Malaysia) Mohd Syahrizal Mohd Nadzir
Physiotherapist	(Malaysia) Muhammad Nur'illya Samsudin
Physiotherapist	(Malaysia) Shukri Che Zakaria
Team admin	(Malaysia) Shahrul Samsudin
Team security	(Malaysia) Zaiyadur Rashad
Team media	(Malaysia) Tajul Arifin
Team analyst	(Malaysia) Hazwan Nizam Fazil
Masseur	(Malaysia) Hazwan Zikri
Kitman	(Malaysia) Taufiq Mahar
Kitman	(Malaysia) Fakhruddin Abdul Aziz
Kitman	(Malaysia) Fahmi Irfan

== Squad ==
As of 5 January 2025

No.	Name	Nat	Date of birth (age)	Last club	Contract since	Contract ends
Goalkeepers
1	Ifwat Akmal	(Malaysia)	10 August 1996 (age 29)	Youth team	2016	2024
25	Wan Mohamad Syazmin	(Malaysia)	8 July 1999 (age 26)	(Malaysia) Sri Pahang	2024	2024
42	Muhammad Hafizy Hajazy	(Malaysia)	17 September 2003 (age 22)	Youth team	2024	2024
43	Aqil Syahmi Azizan	(Malaysia)	22 June 2005 (age 20)	Youth team	2022	2024
44	Norfahmi Muhamad Zaki	(Malaysia)	25 May 2005 (age 20)	Youth team	2024	2024
Defenders
2	Akmal Zahir	(Malaysia)	16 February 1994 (age 31)	(Malaysia) Melaka United	2022	2024
13	Loqman Hakim	(Malaysia)	22 January 1998 (age 28)	Youth team	2020	2024
15	Rizal Ghazali	(Malaysia)	1 October 1992 (age 33)	(Malaysia) Sabah	2024	2024
17	Irfan Zakaria	(Malaysia)	4 June 1995 (age 30)	(Malaysia) Sabah	2024	2024
18	Wan Amirul Afiq	(Malaysia)	18 July 1992 (age 33)	(Malaysia) Melaka United	2023	2024
27	Ariff Farhan	(Malaysia)	14 July 1996 (age 29)	(Malaysia) FELDA United	2021	2024
30	Zamri Pin Ramli	(Malaysia)	24 April 1991 (age 34)	(Malaysia) Negeri Sembilan	2024	2024
31	Aiman Farhan Fauzi	(Malaysia)	26 November 2002 (age 23)	Youth team	2024	2024
40	Safwan Shuhaimi	(Malaysia)	30 May 2005 (age 20)	Youth team	2024	2024
41	Haziq Najmi Mohd Zaki	(Malaysia)	8 March 2006 (age 19)	Youth team	2024	2024
51	Heshamudin Ahmad	(Malaysia)	15 February 1999 (age 26)	Youth team	2022	2024
66	Kamil Akmal Halim	(Malaysia)	14 February 1999 (age 26)	Youth team	2020	2024
Midfielders
19	Aiman Afif	(Malaysia)	18 February 2001 (age 24)	Youth team	2021	2024
20	Fadzrul Danel	(Malaysia)	14 January 1998 (age 28)	Youth team	2019	2024
21	Fayadh Zulkifli	(Malaysia)	13 September 1998 (age 27)	Youth team	2019	2024
35	Hasbullah Abu Bakar	(Malaysia)	26 October 1994 (age 31)	(Malaysia) Negeri Sembilan	2024	2024
77	Amirul Hisyam	(Malaysia)	5 May 1995 (age 30)	(Malaysia) Harimau Muda B	2015	2024
81	Abdul Halim Saari	(Malaysia)	14 November 1994 (age 31)	(Malaysia) Selangor	2023	2024
Strikers
14	Milos Gordic	(Serbia)	10 December 1992 (age 33)	(China) Wuxi Wugo	2024	2024
28	Syafiq Ahmad	(Malaysia)	28 June 1995 (age 30)	(Malaysia) Johor Darul Ta'zim	2024	2025
29	Afeeq Iqmal	(Malaysia)	9 April 1999 (age 26)	(Malaysia) Manjung City	2024	2024
70	Ebenezer Assifuah	(Ghana)	3 July 1993 (age 32)	(France) Pau	2024	2024

== Transfers and contracts ==
=== Transfers in ===
Pre-season

Position	Player	Transferred from	Ref
DF	(Malaysia) Rizal Ghazali	(Malaysia) Sabah	Free
DF	(Malaysia) Irfan Zakaria	(Malaysia) Sabah	Free
DF	(Malaysia) Zamri Pin Ramli	(Malaysia) Negeri Sembilan	Free
MF	(Uzbekistan) Sukhrob Nurullaev	(Uzbekistan) Nasaf Qarshi	Free
MF	(Bahrain) Habib Haroon	(Malaysia) Terengganu	Free
FW	(Malaysia) Afeeq Iqmal	(Malaysia) Manjung City	Free
FW	(Haiti) Sony Norde	(Malaysia) Terengganu	Free
FW	(Serbia) Miloš Gordić	(China) Wuxi Wugo	Free
MF	(Malaysia) Hasbullah Abu Bakar	(Malaysia) Negeri Sembilan	Free
GK	(Malaysia) Wan Syazmin Wan Rozaimi	(Malaysia) Sri Pahang	Free
DF	(Brazil) Cleylton	(Brazil) Ipatinga FC	Free

=== Loans in ===
Pre-season

Position	Player	Transferred from	Ref
FW	(Malaysia) Syafiq Ahmad	(Malaysia) Johor Darul Ta'zim	Season Loan
MF	(Malaysia) Faiz Nasir	(Malaysia) Terengganu	Season Loan

=== Transfers out ===
Position	Player	Transferred to	Ref
DF	(Serbia) Bojan Ciger	(Uzbekistan) Neftchi Fergana	Free
DF	(South Africa) Alan Robertson		Released
DF	(Malaysia) Rodney Akwensivie	(Malaysia) Kuching City	Free
DF	(Malaysia) Azrin Afiq	(Malaysia) Selangor	End Of Loan
MF	(Malaysia) Mior Dani	(Malaysia) Kelantan	End Of Loan
MF	(Philippines) Manny Ott	(Malaysia) Terengganu	Free
MF	(Malaysia) Zharmein Ashraf	(Malaysia) Kuching City	Free
MF	(Malaysia) Faizal Talib	(Malaysia) Kelantan Darul Naim	Free
MF	(Malaysia) Al-Hafiz Harun	(Malaysia) Penang	Free
MF	(Malaysia) Hidhir Idris	(Malaysia) PDRM	Free
MF	(Tajikistan) Amirbek Juraboev	(Tajikistan) Istiklol	Released
MF	(Bahrain) Moses Atede	(Bahrain) Sitra Club	Free
FW	(Argentina) Manuel Hidalgo	(Malaysia) Johor Darul Ta'zim	Free
FW	(Brazil) Jonathan Balotelli	(North Macedonia) FK Makedonija G.P.	Free
FW	(Nigeria) Ifedayo Olusegun	(Malaysia) PDRM	Free
MF	(Bahrain) Habib Haroon	(Bahrain) Sitra Club	Free
GK	(Malaysia) Kalamullah Al-Hafiz	(Malaysia) Selangor	Free
GK	(Malaysia) Fikri Che Soh	(Malaysia) Kelantan Darul Naim	Free
FW	(Haiti) Sony Norde	(Indonesia) Malut United	Free
DF	(Brazil) Cleylton	Free agent	Released
MF	(Uzbekistan) Sukhrob Nurullaev	Free agent	Released
MF	(Malaysia) Faiz Nasir	(Malaysia) Terengganu	End of loan

=== Retained / Promoted ===
Pos	Player	Source
GK	(Malaysia) Ifwat Akmal	1-year contract till 2024
GK	(Malaysia) Fikri Che Soh	1-year contract till 2024
DF	(Malaysia) Akmal Zahir	1-year contract till 2024
DF	(Malaysia) Loqman Hakim	1-year contract till 2024
MF	(Malaysia) Ariff Farhan	1-year contract till 2024
MF	(Malaysia) Fadzrul Danel	1-year contract till 2024
MF	(Malaysia) Amirul Hisyam	1-year contract till 2024
MF	(Malaysia) Abdul Halim Saari	1-year contract till 2024

== Competitions ==
=== Malaysia Super League ===
Pos	Team	Pld	W	D	L	GF	GA	GD	Pts	Qualification or relegation
9	PDRM	24	7	6	11	24	35	−11	27	
10	Penang	24	6	8	10	31	38	−7	26	
11	Kedah Darul Aman (Note: MFL officially snubs Kedah Darul Aman club licensing approval.)	24	6	6	12	21	51	−30	21 (Note: On 5 April 2024, Kedah Darul Aman were deducted three points for failing to pay players and staff on time following previous MFL rules breaches in the 2023 season.)	Ejected from Super League and relegated to A1 Semi-Pro League
12	Negeri Sembilan	24	4	4	16	23	49	−26	16	
13	Kelantan Darul Naim	24	2	1	21	16	82	−66	7	

Source: MFL
Rules for classification: 1) Points; 2) Goal difference; 3) Goals scored;

==== Fixtures and results ====
Win Draw Loss

11 May 2024 1	PDRM	0–1	Kedah Darul Aman	Selayang
17:30 UTC+08:00		Report	Syafiq 1'; Habib (yellow card) 22'	Stadium: Selayang Stadium; Attendance: 1,574; Referee: Fusser Mad Salleh

18 May 2024 2	Selangor	1–0	Kedah Darul Aman	Petaling Jaya
20:15 UTC+08:00	Sharul Nazeem (yellow card) 38'; Aliff Haiqal 85'	Report	Sony Norde (yellow card) 45'; Akmal Zahir (yellow card) 79'	Stadium: MBPJ Stadium; Attendance: 10,077; Referee: Fitri Maskon

24 May 2024 3	Kedah Darul Aman	0–2	Perak	Alor Setar
21:00 UTC+08:00	Ariff Farhan (yellow card) 51'; Cleylton (yellow card) 90+5'	Report	Lee Tae-min 17' 76'; Tommy Mawat (yellow card) 29'; Milunović (yellow card) 45+7'; Luiz Motta (yellow card) 57'; Ramadhan (yellow card) 62'	Stadium: Darul Aman Stadium; Attendance: 9,349; Referee: Razlan Joffri Ali

22 June 2024 4	Penang	0–1	Kedah Darul Aman	Batu Kawan
21:00 UTC+08:00		Report	Assifuah 77'	Stadium: Batu Kawan Stadium

12 July 2024 5	Kedah Darul Aman	3–0	Kelantan Darul Naim	Alor Setar
21:00 UTC+08:00	Rizal 10'; Syafiq 58'; Norde 73'	Report		Stadium: Darul Aman Stadium; Attendance: 2,540

26 July 2024 6	Kedah Darul Aman	1–1	Kuching City	Alor Setar
21:00 UTC+08:00	Hasbullah 61'	Report	Mintah 90+2'	Stadium: Darul Aman Stadium; Attendance: 4,723; Referee: Zamzaidi Katimin

9 August 2024 7	Johor Darul Ta'zim	6–0	Kedah Darul Aman	Iskandar Puteri
20:15 UTC+08:00	Bergson 8', 35', 64'; Feroz 74'; Murilo 75'; Afiq 79'	Report		Stadium: Sultan Ibrahim Stadium; Attendance: 15,216; Referee: S.Logesewaran

17 August 2024 8	Kedah Darul Aman	2–2	Negeri Sembilan	Alor Setar
17:30 UTC+08:00	Norde 53'; Cleylton 62'	Report	Jacque Faye 45+1', 64'	Stadium: Darul Aman Stadium; Attendance: 1,646; Referee: Kamil Zakaria Ismail

14 September 2024 9	Kuala Lumpur City	5–0	Kedah Darul Aman	Cheras
21:00 MYT (UTC+08:00)	Hazrie Balqief 🔴⚽ 23'; Motika 14'; Zhafri 26'; Josue 49', 58'	Report		Stadium: Kuala Lumpur Stadium; Attendance: 1,182; Referee: Usaid Jamal

20 September 2024 10	Kedah Darul Aman	2–2	Sri Pahang	Alor Setar
21:00 MYT (UTC+08:00)	Halim 58'; Nurullaev 64'			Stadium: Darul Aman Stadium

29 October 2024 11	Sabah	5–2	Kedah Darul Aman	Likas
18:45 (UTC+08:00)	Saddil 3'; João Pedro 48', 68'; S. Kumaahran 84'; Gary Steven 90+4'		Cleylton 45+3'; Gordić 65'	Stadium: Likas Stadium; Attendance: 5,006; Referee: Zuhadi Dzulkifli

19 October 2024 12	Kedah Darul Aman	1–0	Terengganu	Alor Setar
21:00 (UTC+08:00)	Cleylton 45+6'			Stadium: Darul Aman Stadium; Attendance: 3,281; Referee: Zuhadi Dzulkifli

25 October 2024 13	Kedah Darul Aman	1–1	PDRM	Alor Setar
21:00 (UTC+08:00)	Cleylton 30'		Oluwaseun 56'	Stadium: Darul Aman Stadium; Attendance: 3,446; Referee: Hasrol Amir

2 November 2024 14	Kedah Darul Aman	0–1	Selangor	Alor Setar
21:00 (UTC+08:00)			Aliff Izwan 47'	Stadium: Darul Aman Stadium; Attendance: 6,090; Referee: Hasrol Amir

4 December 2024 15	Perak	1–1	Kedah Darul Aman	Manjung
21:00 (UTC+08:00)	Clayton 71'		Amirul Hisyam 90+2'	Stadium: Manjung Stadium, Attendance: 865; Referee: Fusser Mad Salleh

18 December 2024 16	Kedah Darul Aman	1–0	Penang	Alor Setar
21:00 (UTC+08:00)	Nurullaev 10'	Report		Stadium: Darulaman Stadium; Attendance: 1,565; Referee: Khairulsyahmi Ahmad Khalidi

10 January 2025 17	Kelantan Darul Naim	0–1	Kedah Darul Aman	Kota Bharu
21:00 (UTC+08:00)			Fayadh 17'	Stadium: Sultan Muhammad IV Stadium

24 January 2025 18	Kuching City	3–0	Kedah Darul Aman	Kuching
20:15 (UTC+08:00)				Stadium: Negeri Stadium

26 February 2025 19	Negeri Sembilan	2–0	Kedah Darul Aman

7 March 2025 20	Kedah Darul Aman	2–3	PDRM

29 March 2025 21	Kedah Darul Aman	1–6	Johor Darul Ta'zim
	Afeeq 33'

8 April 2025 22	Sri Pahang	6–0	Kedah Darul Aman

12 April 2025 23	Kedah Darul Aman	1–1	Sabah

20 April 2025 24	Terengganu	3–0	Kedah Darul Aman

=== Malaysia FA Cup ===
Round of 16

14 June 2024 Round of 16	Kedah Darul Aman	5–0	Bukit Tambun	Alor Setar
21:00 UTC+08:00	Gordić 15'; Amirul 21'; Assifuah 39', 68', 79'	Report		Stadium: Darul Aman Stadium; Attendance: 5,436; Referee: Khairul Syafiq Ahmad Khalidi

Quarter-finals

28 June 2024 First leg	Penang	0–1	Kedah Darul Aman	Georgetown
20:15 UTC+08:00	Hasbullah 74'	Report		Stadium: City Stadium; Attendance: 6,102; Referee: Ahmad Zuhaidi Dzulkifli

5 July 2024 Second leg	Kedah Darul Aman	0–0 (1–0 agg.)	Penang	Alor Setar
21:00 UTC+08:00		Report		Stadium: Darul Aman Stadium; Attendance: 16,700; Referee: Amirul Izwan Yaacob

Semi-finals

19 July 2024 First leg	Kedah Darul Aman	1–2	Johor Darul Ta'zim	Alor Setar
21:00 UTC+08:00		Report		Stadium: Darul Aman Stadium; Attendance: 18,317; Referee: Nazmi Nasaruddin

3 August 2024 Second leg	Johor Darul Ta'zim	3–0 (5–1 agg.)	Kedah Darul Aman	Iskandar Puteri
21:00 UTC+08:00				Stadium: Sultan Ibrahim Stadium

=== Malaysia Cup ===
Round of 16

22 November 2024 First leg	Kedah Darul Aman	3–2	Kuala Lumpur City	Alor Setar
21:00 UTC+08:00	Nordé 27', 30'; Nurullaev 68'		R. Lambert 13'; Motika 72'	Stadium: Darulaman Stadium; Attendance: 3,386; Referee: Faizudin Ismail

1 December 2024 Second leg	Kuala Lumpur City	4–1 (6–4 agg.)	Kedah Darul Aman	Cheras
21:00 UTC+08:00	Josué 14'; Motika 19'; R. Lambert 41'; Zhafri 90+2'		Gordić 74'	Stadium: Kuala Lumpur Stadium, Attendance: 1,778; Referee: Fitri Maskon

=== MFL Challenge Cup ===
Quarter-finals

13 December 2024 First leg	Kedah Darul Aman	3–0	Kuala Lumpur Rovers	Alor Setar
21:00 UTC+08:00	Cleylton 40'; Aiman Afif 64'; Assifuah 78'			Stadium: Darulaman Stadium; Attendance: 1,953; Referee: Amirul Yusuf Chow

22 December 2024 Second leg	Kuala Lumpur Rovers	0–3 (0–6 agg.)	Kedah Darul Aman	Cheras
17:00 UTC+08:00			Hasbullah 45'; Aiman Afif 75'; Amirul Hisyam 90+3'	Stadium: Kuala Lumpur Stadium, Attendance: 225; Referee: Izwan Abdullah

Semi-finals

18 January 2025 First leg	PDRM	3–3	Kedah Darul Aman	Selayang
21:00 UTC+08:00				Stadium: Selayang Municipal Council Stadium,

1 February 2025 Second leg	Kedah Darul Aman	1–1 (a.e.t.) (4–4 agg.) (5–4 p)	PDRM	Alor Setar
21:00 UTC+08:00		Report		Stadium: Darulaman Stadium,

== Statistics ==
=== Appearances and goals ===
As of 1 February 2025

List includes all first team players and any other matchday squad players

No.	Pos	Nat	Player	Total		Malaysia Super League		Malaysia FA Cup		Malaysia Cup		MFL Challenge Cup	
No.	Pos	Nat	Player	Apps	Goals	Apps	Goals	Apps	Goals	Apps	Goals	Apps	Goals
Goalkeepers
1	GK	(Malaysia) MAS	Ifwat Akmal	14	0	10	0	0	0	0+1	0	2+1	0
22	GK	(Malaysia) MAS	Kalamullah Al-Hafiz	13	0	8	0	5	0	0	0	0	0
25	GK	(Malaysia) MAS	Syazmin Ruzaimi	9	0	5	0	0	0	2	0	2	0
42	GK	(Malaysia) MAS	Hafizy Hijazy	1	0	1	0	0	0	0	0	0	0
Defenders
2	DF	(Malaysia) MAS	Akmal Zahir	19	1	12+3	0	0	0	1	0	2+1	1
13	DF	(Malaysia) MAS	Loqman Hakim	19	0	10+2	0	1	0	2	0	4	0
15	DF	(Malaysia) MAS	Rizal Ghazali	15	1	6+5	1	4	0	0	0	0	0
18	DF	(Malaysia) MAS	Wan Amirul Afiq	25	0	15+2	0	2+1	0	1	0	4	0
23	DF	(Brazil) BRA	Cleylton	23	5	15	4	4	0	2	0	2	1
30	DF	(Malaysia) MAS	Zamri Pin Ramli	4	0	0+1	0	0+3	0	0	0	0	0
31	DF	(Malaysia) MAS	Aiman Farhan	7	0	1+6	0	0	0	0	0	0	0
40	DF	(Malaysia) MAS	Safwan Shuhaimi	2	0	1+1	0	0	0	0	0	0	0
41	DF	(Malaysia) MAS	Haziq Najmi	1	0	0+1	0	0	0	0	0	0	0
47	DF	(Malaysia) MAS	Hafiz Haiqal	1	0	0+1	0	0	0	0	0	0	0
48	DF	(Malaysia) MAS	Ammar Shukri	1	0	0+1	0	0	0	0	0	0	0
49	DF	(Malaysia) MAS	Hazrie Balqief	1	0	1	0	0	0	0	0	0	0
51	DF	(Malaysia) MAS	Heshamudin Ahmad	7	0	3+1	0	0	0	0	0	0+3	0
66	DF	(Malaysia) MAS	Kamil Akmal Halim	21	0	4+8	0	0+4	0	1	0	3+1	0
Midfielders
5	MF	(Bahrain) BHR	Habib Haroon	12	1	7	0	5	1	0	0	0	0
11	MF	(Uzbekistan) UZB	Sukhrob Nurullaev	19	3	11+1	2	4	0	1	1	2	0
17	MF	(Malaysia) MAS	Irfan Zakaria	17	0	7+4	0	5	0	1	0	0	0
19	MF	(Malaysia) MAS	Aiman Afif	17	3	9+1	0	0+1	0	2	0	4	3
20	MF	(Malaysia) MAS	Fadzrul Danel	25	1	5+13	1	0+3	0	1	0	0+3	0
21	MF	(Malaysia) MAS	Fayadh Zulkifli	27	1	9+10	1	0+4	0	2	0	2	0
27	MF	(Malaysia) MAS	Ariff Farhan Isa	33	0	23	0	5	0	0+1	0	4	0
35	MF	(Malaysia) MAS	Hasbullah Abu Bakar	30	3	16+4	1	2+2	1	2	0	4	1
52	MF	(Malaysia) MAS	Danial Tarmizi	12	0	4+5	0	0	0	0	0	1+2	0
55	MF	(Malaysia) MAS	Faiz Nasir	9	0	0+7	0	2	0	0	0	0	0
57	MF	(Malaysia) MAS	Akmal Hakim	7	0	1+4	0	0	0	0+1	0	0+1	0
58	MF	(Malaysia) MAS	Adam Mukriz	1	0	0+1	0	0	0	0	0	0	0
60	MF	(Malaysia) MAS	Sharul Aiman	1	0	1	0	0	0	0	0	0	0
58	MF	(Malaysia) MAS	Adam Mukriz	1	0	0+1	0	0	0	0	0	0	0
61	MF	(Malaysia) MAS	Nazirul Aziem	1	0	0+1	0	0	0	0	0	0	0
68	MF	(Malaysia) MAS	Kadim As Syahid	1	0	1	0	0	0	0	0	0	0
69	MF	(Malaysia) MAS	Hafiz Izzudin	1	0	1	0	0	0	0	0	0	0
77	MF	(Malaysia) MAS	Amirul Hisyam Kechik	25	5	11+4	2	3+2	1	0+1	0	3+1	2
81	MF	(Malaysia) MAS	Abdul Halim Saari	15	1	9+3	1	1	0	0	0	1+1	0
82	MF	(Malaysia) MAS	Aiman Danial	1	0	0	0	0	0	0	0	0+1	0
Forwards
10	FW	(Haiti) HAI	Sony Nordé	19	4	12	2	5	0	2	2	0	0
14	FW	(Serbia) SRB	Miloš Gordić	30	5	20+1	2	3+1	1	0+1	1	3+1	1
28	FW	(Malaysia) MAS	Syafiq Ahmad	15	2	11+2	2	2	0	0	0	0	0
29	FW	(Malaysia) MAS	Afeeq Iqmal	16	1	5+6	1	0	0	0+1	0	0+4	0
70	FW	(Ghana) GHA	Ebenezer Assifuah	27	6	8+11	1	3+2	4	1	0	1+1	1
Players transferred out during the season
