= 2023 Kedah Darul Aman F.C. season =

Kedah Darul Aman
2023 season
- Owner: Mohd Daud Bakar
- CEO: Khamal Idris Ali
- Head coach: Nafuzi Zain
- Stadium: Darul Aman Stadium (Capacity: 32,387)
- Malaysia Super League: 4th
- Malaysia FA Cup: First Round
- Malaysia Cup: Round of 16
- Top goalscorer: League: Ifedayo Olusegun (12); All: Ifedayo Olusegun (12)
- Average home league attendance: 8,650
Home colours	Away colours

The 2023 season was Kedah Darul Aman's 15th season in the Malaysia Super League since the league's inception in 2004.

== Management Team ==
Position	Name
Head coach	(Malaysia) Nafuzi Zain
Assistant head coach	(Malaysia) Victor Andrag
Goalkeeper coach	(Malaysia) Mohd Yazid Mohd Yassin
Assistant Goalkeeper coaches	(Malaysia) Abdul Hadi Abdul Hamid
Fitness coaches	(Brazil) Antonio Silvio Santos Concalves
Team Doctor	(Malaysia) Jasminder Singh
Physiotherapist	(Brazil) Helber Richard Quintana Silva
Physiotherapist	(Malaysia) Shukri Che Zakaria
Team coordinator	(Malaysia) Zul Fadli Rozi
Team admin	(Malaysia) Shahrul Samsudin
Team security	(Malaysia) Zaiyadur Rashad
Team media	(Malaysia) Tajul Arifin
Team analyst	(Malaysia) Hazwan Nizam Fazil
Masseur	(Malaysia) Hazwan Zikri
Kitman	(Malaysia) Taufiq Mahar
Kitman	(Malaysia) Fakhruddin Abdul Aziz
Kitman	(Malaysia) Fahmi Irfan

== Squad ==
As of 8 January 2023

No.	Name	Nat	Date of birth (age)	Last club	Contract since	Contract ends
Goalkeepers
1	Ifwat Akmal	(Malaysia)	10 August 1996 (age 30)	Youth team	2016	2023
22	Kalamullah Al-Hafiz	(Malaysia)	30 July 1995 (age 31)	(Malaysia) Petaling Jaya City	2023	2024
33	Fikri Che Soh	(Malaysia)	1 February 1998 (age 28)	(Malaysia) Kelantan United	2023	2024
Defenders
2	Akmal Zahir	(Malaysia)	16 February 1994 (age 32)	(Malaysia) Melaka United	2022	2023
3	Rodney Celvin	(Malaysia)	25 November 1996 (age 29)	(Malaysia) Selangor	2021	2023
4	Bojan Ciger	(Serbia)	18 June 1994 (age 32)	(Uzbekistan) PFC Navbahor Namangan	2023	2023
5	Alan Robertson	(South Africa)	17 February 1994 (age 32)	(Philippines) United City	2023	2023
13	Loqman Hakim	(Malaysia)	22 January 1998 (age 28)	Youth team	2020	2023
15	Heshamudin Ahmad	(Malaysia)	15 February 1999 (age 27)	Youth team	2022	2023
18	Wan Amirul Afiq	(Malaysia)	18 July 1992 (age 34)	(Malaysia) Melaka United	2023	2024
27	Ariff Farhan	(Malaysia)	14 July 1996 (age 30)	(Malaysia) FELDA United	2021	2023
31	Azrin Afiq	(Malaysia)	2 January 2002 (age 24)	(Malaysia) Selangor	2023	2023
66	Kamil Akmal Halim	(Malaysia)	14 February 1999 (age 27)	Youth team	2020	2023
Midfielders
6	Amirbek Juraboev	(Tajikistan)	13 April 1996 (age 30)	(Philippines) United City	2022	2023
8	Manny Ott	(Philippines)	6 May 1992 (age 34)	(Malaysia) Terengganu	2022	2023
10	Lee Tuck	(Malaysia)	30 June 1988 (age 38)	(Malaysia) Sri Pahang	2023	2023
11	Al-Hafiz Harun	(Malaysia)	13 April 1994 (age 32)	(Malaysia) Penang	2022	2023
17	Faizal Talib	(Malaysia)	28 July 1997 (age 29)	(Malaysia) Melaka United	2023	2024
19	Aiman Afif	(Malaysia)	18 February 2001 (age 25)	Youth team	2021	2023
20	Fadzrul Danel	(Malaysia)	14 January 1998 (age 28)	Youth team	2019	2023
21	Fayadh Zulkifli	(Malaysia)	13 September 1998 (age 28)	Youth team	2019	2023
29	Mior Dani	(Malaysia)	19 January 1999 (age 27)	(Malaysia) Kelantan	2023	2023
77	Amirul Hisyam	(Malaysia)	5 May 1995 (age 31)	(Malaysia) Harimau Muda B	2015	2023
Strikers
9	Willian Lira	(Brazil)	9 December 1993 (age 32)	(Japan) Ventforet Kofu	2023	2023
70	Ebenezer Assifuah	(Ghana)	3 July 1993 (age 33)	(France) Pau	2023	2023
88	Manuel Hidalgo	(Argentina)	3 May 1999 (age 27)	(Malaysia) Sri Pahang	2023	2023
89	Jonathan Balotelli	(Brazil)	20 April 1989 (age 37)	(France) Pau	2023	2023

== Friendlies ==
=== Pre-season ===
20 January 2023 1	Kedah Darul Aman (Malaysia)	2–0	(Malaysia) Kelantan	Alor Setar
	Lira 53', 84'			Stadium: Darul Aman Stadium

24 January 2023 2	Kedah Darul Aman (Malaysia)	6–0	(Malaysia) FAM-MSN Project	Alor Setar
	Lee Tuck 22', 27'; Lira 23'; Juraboev 38', 51' (o.g.); Al-Hafiz 90' (pen.)			Stadium: Darul Aman Stadium

2023 Harapan Cup (1–4 February)

2 February 2023 1	Kedah Darul Aman (Malaysia)	0–0 (a.e.t.) (5–6 p)	(Malaysia) Selangor	Penang
				Stadium: Penang State Stadium
	Penalties
	Lira (penalty scored); Hidalgo (penalty missed); Tuck (penalty scored); Juraboev (penalty scored); Ciger (penalty scored); Amirul Hisyam (penalty scored); Al-Hafiz (penalty missed)		Ayron (penalty scored); Noor (penalty scored); Mukhairi (penalty scored); Cheng (penalty missed); Faisal (penalty scored); Yazan (penalty scored); Htet Aung (penalty scored)

4 February 2023 2	Kedah Darul Aman (Malaysia)	2–1	(Singapore) Geylang International	Penang
	Zharmein 31'; Al-Hafiz 37'		Bezecourt 40'	Stadium: Penang State Stadium

Tour of Turkey (4–9 February)

9 February 2023 1	Kedah Darul Aman (Malaysia)	1–2	(Uzbekistan) FC Nasaf	Antalya
	Lira 58'		Norchaev 80', 84' (pen.)	Stadium: S&B Football Complex

10 February 2023 2	Kedah Darul Aman (Malaysia)	0–2	(Kazakhstan) FC Shakhter Karagandy	Antalya
				Stadium: S&B Football Complex

12 February 2023 3	Kedah Darul Aman (Malaysia)	1–2	(Kazakhstan) FC Maktaaral	Antalya
	Lee Tuck 72'			Stadium: Limak Arcadia Sport Center

14 February 2023 4	Kedah Darul Aman (Malaysia)	0–2	(Ukraine) FC Metalist Kharkiv	Antalya
				Stadium: Ekodizayn Spor Kompleksi

== Competitions ==
=== Malaysia Super League ===
Pos	Team	Pld	W	D	L	GF	GA	GD	Pts	Qualification or relegation
2	Selangor	26	20	1	5	72	22	+50	61	Qualification for the AFC Champions League Two group stage (Note: Since the winners of the 2023 Malaysia FA Cup (Johor Darul Ta'zim) qualified for Asian competition based on their league positions, the berths awarded to the 2nd-placed team in the league.)
3	Sabah	26	17	3	6	64	33	+31	54	
4	Kedah Darul Aman	26	17	2	7	52	29	+23	53	
5	Sri Pahang	26	13	6	7	44	33	+11	45	
6	Terengganu	26	11	7	8	45	34	+11	40	Qualification for the AFF Shopee Cup group stage (Note: Qualified as the 2023 Malaysia Cup & 2023 Malaysia FA Cup runner-up.)

Source: MFL
Rules for classification: 1) Points; 2) Goal difference; 3) Number of goals scored.

==== Results summary ====
Overall								Home						Away					
Pld	W	D	L	GF	GA	GD	Pts	W	D	L	GF	GA	GD	W	D	L	GF	GA	GD
8	5	1	2	13	11	+2	16	3	0	1	5	1	+4	2	1	1	8	10	−2

Source: FAM-CMS

==== Fixtures and results ====
Win Draw Loss

25 February 2023 1	Perak	1–4	Kedah Darul Aman	Ipoh
21:00 UTC+08:00	Ikhwan 3'; Haziq (red card) 35'; Imran (yellow card) 67'; Afolabi (red card) 78'	Report	Lee Tuck 17'; Lira (yellow card) 20', (goal) 66' (pen.); Akmal (yellow card) 60'; Ariff 84'; Balotelli 90+3', (yellow card) 90+3'	Stadium: Perak Stadium; Attendance: 15,106; Referee: Zulkarnain Zakaria

1 March 2023 2	Kedah Darul Aman	1–0	Terengganu	Alor Setar
21:00 UTC+08:00	Fadzrul 90'	Report	Mamut (yellow card) 67'	Stadium: Darul Aman Stadium; Attendance: 21,700; Referee: S. Logeswaran

4 March 2023 3	Kedah Darul Aman	0–1	PDRM	Alor Setar
21:00 UTC+08:00	Ott (red card) 58'; Ariff (yellow card) 79'; Fayadh (yellow card) 83'; Fadzrul (yellow card) 90+2'	Report	Safiee (yellow card) 58'; Fadi (yellow card) 72'; Suzuki 75'; Arif (yellow card) 83'; Norfiqrie (yellow card) 90+3'	Stadium: Darul Aman Stadium; Attendance: 12,792; Referee: Mohd Azizan Saat Ariffin

13 March 2023 4	Kelantan United	2–3	Kedah Darul Aman	Kota Bharu
21:00 UTC+08:00	Indra (yellow card) 4'; Devid 21'; Victor 89' (pen.); Asraff (yellow card) 90'	Report	Lira 34'; Hidalgo 44' (pen.); Afiq (yellow card) 72'; Al-Hafiz 89'	Stadium: Sultan Muhammad IV Stadium; Attendance: 1,954; Referee: Fitri Maskon

17 March 2023 5	Kedah Darul Aman	3–0	Kuching City	Alor Setar
21:00 UTC+08:00	Akmal 28', 49'; Hidalgo 58'	Report		Stadium: Darul Aman Stadium; Attendance: 7,662; Referee: Zamzaidi Katimin

1 April 2023 6	Sri Pahang	1–1	Kedah Darul Aman	Kuantan
22:00 UTC+08:00	Brundo 62' (pen.)	Report	Ariff (yellow card) 61'; Hidalgo (yellow card) 72'; Balotelli 90+2'	Stadium: Darul Makmur Stadium; Attendance: 7,296; Referee: Razlan Joffri Ali

5 April 2023 7	Kedah Darul Aman	1–0	Penang	Alor Setar
22:00 UTC+08:00	Juraboev (yellow card) 26'; Afiq (yellow card) 34' (yellow-red card) 54'; Ariff (yellow card) 37'; Lira 65'	Report	Rafael (yellow card) 47'; Faris (yellow card) 72'	Stadium: Darul Aman Stadium; Attendance: 3,230; Referee: Mohd Hasrol Mohd Amir

9 April 2023 8	Johor Darul Ta'zim	6–0	Kedah Darul Aman	Iskandar Puteri
22:00 UTC+08:00	Forestieri 23', (yellow card) 45'; Feroz 48'; Arribas 50'; Bergson 53' (pen.); Arif 77'; Velázquez 86'	Report	Ott (yellow card) 15'	Stadium: Sultan Ibrahim Stadium; Attendance: 13,722; Referee: Razlan Joffri Ali

18 April 2023 9	Kedah Darul Aman	2-3	Kuala Lumpur City	Alor Setar
22:00 MYT (UTC+08:00)	Jonathan Balotelli 25’; Bojan Ciger 30’	Report	Paulo Josué 11’; Romel Morales 48’; Ryan Lambert (yellow card) 58'; Caion 75’	Stadium: Darul Aman Stadium; Attendance: 2,590; Referee: Nazmi Nasaruddin

28 April 2023 10	Negeri Sembilan	1-2	Kedah Darul Aman	Paroi
20:15 MYT (UTC+08:00)	Nasrullah Hanif (yellow card) 9'; Zainal Abidin 35'; Zamri Pin Ramli (yellow card) 65'; Che Rashid (yellow card) 70'; Annas Rahmat (yellow card) 90'	Report	Willian Lira 30', 72' (yellow card) 86'; Ariff Farhan (yellow card) 81'; Kalamullah Al-Hafiz (yellow card) 84'	Stadium: Tuanku Abdul Rahman Stadium; Attendance: 2,348; Referee: Tuan Mohd Yaasin bin Tuan Mohd Hanafiah

19 May 2023 11	Kedah Darul Aman	5-0	Kelantan	Alor Setar
21:00 (UTC+08:00)	Manny Ott 16'; Lee Tuck 28'; Manuel Hidalgo 47'; Willian Lira (penalty scored); Kamil Akmal (yellow card) 69'; Jonathan Balotelli 89'	Report	Yusri Yuhasmadi (yellow card) 80'; Khairul Helmi (yellow card) 86'	Stadium: Darul Aman Stadium; Attendance: 3,320; Referee: Razlan Joffri Ali

24 May 2023 12	Selangor	3-2	Kedah Darul Aman	Petaling Jaya
21:00 (UTC+08:00)	Ayron del Valle 23'; Faisal Halim 40'; Noor Al-Rawabdeh 78'	Report	Juraboev 6'; Willian Lira 28'; Kamil Akmal (yellow card) 45+3' (yellow-red card) , 75'	Stadium: Petaling Jaya Stadium; Attendance: 10,689; Referee: Nazmi Nasaruddin

1 June 2023 13	Kedah Darul Aman	2-1	Sabah	Alor Setar
21:00 (UTC+08:00)	Lee Tuck 40', 72' (yellow card) 90+2'; Bojan Ciger (yellow card) 60'; Ifwat Akmal (yellow card) 90+4'	Report	Gabriel Peres 8'; Baddrol Bakhtiar (yellow card) 26'; Irfan Zakaria (yellow card) 45+2'	Stadium: Darul Aman Stadium; Attendance: 9,741; Referee: Tuan Mohd Yaasin bin Tuan Mohd Hanafiah

=== Malaysia FA Cup ===
8 March 2023 First round	Kedah Darul Aman	2–2 (a.e.t.) (3–4 p)	Penang	Alor Setar
21:00 UTC+08:00	Ott 9', 90'	Report	Gomes 22'; Saad 68'	Stadium: Darul Aman Stadium; Attendance: 13,768; Referee: Razlan Joffri Ali
	Penalties
	Hidalgo (penalty scored); Balotelli (penalty scored); Tuck (penalty missed); Juraboev (penalty scored); Ciger (penalty missed)		Zaw (penalty scored); Rafael (penalty scored); Hadin (penalty scored); Faris (penalty scored)

=== Malaysia Cup ===
3 August 2023 Round of 16	Perak	3-1	Kedah	Ipoh
20:15 MYT (UTC+08:00)	Luciano Guaycochea 48' (pen.); Luka Milunovic 55'; Sunday Afolabi (yellow card) 65'; Hakimi Mat Isa 86'	Report	Manuel Ott 1'; Rodney Celvin (red card) 61'; Manuel Hidalgo (yellow card) 90+3'	Stadium: Perak Stadium; Attendance: 4, 088; Referee: Usaid Jamal

18 August 2023 Round of 16	Kedah Darul Aman	2-1 (3-4 agg.)	Perak	Alor Setar
21:00 MYT (UTC+08:00)	Manuel Hidalgo 28' (pen.); Akmal Zahir 83'	Report	Luciano Guaycochea (yellow card) 32'; Sunday Afolabi (yellow card) 74'; Afif Asyraf (yellow card) 76'; Seo Seonung 85'	Stadium: Darul Aman Stadium; Attendance: 9, 110; Referee: Razlan Joffri Ali

== Transfers and contracts ==
=== Transfers in ===
Pre-season

Position	Player	Transferred from	Ref
GK	(Malaysia) Kalamullah Al-Hafiz	(Malaysia) Petaling Jaya City	Free
MF	(Tajikistan) Amirbek Juraboev	(Philippines) United City	Free
GK	(Malaysia) Fikri Che Soh	(Malaysia) Kelantan United	Free
MF	(Philippines) Manny Ott	(Malaysia) Terengganu	Free
DF	(Malaysia) Wan Amirul Afiq	(Malaysia) Melaka United	Free
FW	(Malaysia) Faizal Talib	(Malaysia) Melaka United	Free
MF	(Malaysia) Zharmein Ashraf	(Malaysia) Sarawak United	Free
FW	(Malaysia) Lee Tuck	(Malaysia) Sri Pahang	Free
DF	(South Africa) Alan Robertson	(Philippines) United City	Free
DF	(Serbia) Bojan Ciger	(Uzbekistan) PFC Navbahor Namangan	Free
FW	(Brazil) Willian Lira	(Japan) Ventforet Kofu	Free
FW	(Argentina) Manuel Hidalgo	(Malaysia) Sri Pahang	Undisclosed Fee
FW	(Brazil) Jonathan Balotelli	(South Korea) Jeonnam Dragons	Undisclosed Fee

=== Loan in ===
Pre-season

Position	Player	Transferred from	Ref
DF	(Malaysia) Azrin Afiq	(Malaysia) Selangor	Season Loan
MF	(Malaysia) Mior Dani	(Malaysia) Kelantan	Season Loan

=== Transfers out ===
Pre-season

Position	Player	Transferred To	Ref
GK	(Malaysia) Ilham Amirullah Razali	(Malaysia) Kelantan United	Free
GK	(Malaysia) Shahril Saa'ri		Released
DF	(Andorra) Marc Vales		Released
DF	(Malaysia) Syazwan Tajudin	(Malaysia) BRM FC	Free
DF	(Malaysia) Amirul Azhan	(Malaysia) Harini Selangor	Free
DF	(Malaysia) Azmeer Aris	(Malaysia) Penang	Free
MF	(Malaysia) Asnan Ahmad	(Malaysia) Penang	Free
MF	(Malaysia) Khairu Azrin Khazali	(Malaysia) Kelantan United	Free
MF	(Malaysia) Amer Azahar	(Malaysia) Penang	Free
MF	(Malaysia) Syazwan Zainon	(Malaysia) Kelantan United	Free
MF	(Ivory Coast) Dechi Marcel		Released
MF	(Thailand) Sanrawat Dechmitr	(Thailand) Bangkok United F.C.	End of Loan
MF	(Malaysia) Azamuddin Akil		Released
FW	(Jordan) Mahmoud Al-Mardi	(Kuwait) Qadsia SC	Free
FW	(Cameroon) Ronald Ngah		Released
FW	(Malaysia) Afeeq Iqmal		Released
FW	(Malaysia) Fikhri Zulkiflee		Released

=== Loan Out ===
Pre-season

Position	Player	Transferred To	Ref

=== Loan Return ===
Mid-season

Position	Player	Transferred To	Ref

=== Retained / Promoted ===
Pos	Player	Source
DF	(Malaysia) Loqman Hakim	1 year contract signed in 2022 till 2023
DF	(Malaysia) Heshamudin Ahmad	1 year contract signed in 2022 till 2023
MF	(Malaysia) Kamil Akmal Halim	1 year contract signed in 2022 till 2023
MF	(Malaysia) Al-Hafiz Harun	1 year contract signed in 2022 till 2023

== Statistics ==
=== Appearances and goals ===
Players with no appearances not included in the list.

As of match played 9 April 2023

No.	Pos.	Name	League		FA Cup		Malaysia Cup		Total	
No.	Pos.	Name	Apps	Goals	Apps	Goals	Apps	Goals	Apps	Goals
1	GK	(Malaysia) Ifwat Akmal	5	0	0	0	0	0	0	0
2	DF	(Malaysia) Akmal Zahir	18	2	1	0	1	0	0	0
3	DF	(Malaysia) Rodney Celvin	13	0	0	0	1	0	0	0
4	DF	(Serbia) Bojan Ciger	25	1	1	0	2	0	0	0
5	DF	(South Africa) Alan Robertson	0	0	0	0	0	0	0	0
6	MF	(Tajikistan) Amirbek Juraboev	23	6	1	0	2	0	0	0
8	MF	(Philippines) Manny Ott	23	3	1	2	2	1	0	0
9	FW	(Brazil) Willian Lira	14	8	1	0	0	0	0	0
10	MF	(Malaysia) Lee Tuck	15	5	1	0	0	0	0	0
11	MF	(Malaysia) Al-Hafiz Harun	12	1	1	0	0	0	0	0
12	FW	(Nigeria) Ifedayo Olusegun	0	0	0	0	2	0	0	0
13	DF	(Malaysia) Loqman Hakim	7	0	0	0	1	0	0	0
15	DF	(Malaysia) Heshamudin Ahmad	7	0	1	0	0	0	0	0
16	MF	(Malaysia) Partiban Janasekaran	0	0	0	0	2	0	0	0
17	MF	(Malaysia) Faizal Talib	2	0	0	0	0	0	0	0
18	DF	(Malaysia) Wan Amirul Afiq	24	1	1	0	2	0	0	0
19	MF	(Malaysia) Aiman Afif	5	0	0	0	0	0	0	0
20	MF	(Malaysia) Fadzrul Danel	18	2	1	0	1	0	0	0
21	MF	(Malaysia) Fayadh Zulkifli	24	0	1	0	2	0	0	0
22	GK	(Malaysia) Kalamullah Al-Hafiz	21	0	1	0	2	0	0	0
25	MF	(Bahrain) Moses Atede	0	0	0	0	1	0	0	0
27	MF	(Malaysia) Ariff Farhan	23	2	1	0	2	0	0	0
29	MF	(Malaysia) Mior Dani	9	0	0	0	1	0	0	0
31	DF	(Malaysia) Azrin Afiq	4	0	0	0	0	0	0	0
33	GK	(Malaysia) Fikri Che Soh	0	0	0	0	0	0	0	0
66	DF	(Malaysia) Kamil Akmal Halim	10	0	0	0	0	0	10	0
70	FW	(Ghana) Ebenezer Assifuah	0	0	0	0	0	0	0	0
77	MF	(Malaysia) Amirul Hisyam	14	0	0	0	2	0	0	0
79	MF	(Malaysia) Zharmein Ashraf	0	0	0	0	1	0	0	0
88	FW	(Argentina) Manuel Hidalgo	24	3	1	0	2	0	0	0
89	FW	(Brazil) Jonathan Balotelli	20	4	1	0	1	0	0	0

=== Goalscorers ===
As of 14 April 2024

Rank	Player	League	FA Cup	Malaysia Cup	Total
1	(Nigeria) Ifedayo Olusegun	12	0	0	12
2	(Brazil) Willian Lira	8	0	0	8
3	(Tajikistan) Amirbek Juraboev	6	0	0	6
3	(Philippines) Manuel Ott	3	2	1	6
4	(Malaysia) Lee Tuck	5	0	0	5
5	(Argentina) Manuel Hidalgo	3	0	1	4
5	(Brazil) Jonathan Balotelli	4	0	0	4
6	(Malaysia) Akmal Zahir	2	0	1	3
7	(Malaysia) Fadzrul Danel	2	0	0	2
7	(Malaysia) Ariff Farhan	2	0	0	2
8	(Malaysia) Wan Amirul Afiq	1	0	0	1
8	(Malaysia) Al-Hafiz Harun	1	0	0	1
8	(Serbia) Bojan Ciger	1	0	0	1
8	(Malaysia) Partisan Janasekaran	1	0	0	1
8	(Bahrain) Moses Atede	1	0	0	1
Total		52	2	3	57
