= 2025–26 Kuching City F.C. season =

Kuching City
2025–26 season
- Chairman: Fazzrudin Abdul Rahman
- CEO: Iswandi Ali Hassan
- Head coach: Aidil Sharin Sahak
- Stadium: Sarawak Stadium
- Malaysia Super League: 2nd
- Malaysia FA Cup: Semi-finals
- Malaysia Cup: Runner Up
- Top goalscorer: League: Ronald Ngah (13 goals); All: Ronald Ngah (22 goals)
Home colours	Away colours

The 2025–26 season is Kuching City's tenth year in existence and their third consecutive season in the top flight. The club will participate in the Malaysia Super League, the Malaysia FA Cup and the Malaysia Cup.

== Coaching staff ==
- Team manager: (Malaysia) Irwanshah Mohamad
- Assistant team manager: (Malaysia) Ismail Hamdin
- Head coach: (Singapore) Aidil Sharin Sahak
- Assistant head coach: (Malaysia) Zulkarnien Mohd Poasa
- Assistant coach: (Belarus) Oleg Kuzmianok
- Goalkeeper coach: (Malaysia) Khairul Azman Mohamed
- Assistant goalkeeper coach: (Malaysia) Roslan Madilan
- Fitness coach: (Malaysia) Azmi Ibrahim

== Players ==
=== First-team squad ===
Note: Flags indicate national team as defined under FIFA eligibility rules; some limited exceptions apply. Players may hold more than one non-FIFA nationality.

No.	Pos.	Nation	Player
1	GK	MAS	Syafie Mursalim
2	DF	MAS	Jimmy Raymond
3	DF	MAS	Rodney Celvin
5	DF	PHI	Scott Woods
6	DF	MAS	Arif Fadzilah
7	FW	MAS	Ramadhan Saifullah
8	FW	MAS	Hazwan Bakri
10	MF	NAM	Petrus Shitembi
11	FW	CMR	Jerome Mpacko Etame
14	FW	MAS	Amir Amri
17	FW	MAS	Danial Asri
18	FW	CMR	Ronald Ngah
19	FW	MAS	Gabriel Nistelrooy (on loan from Johor Darul Ta'zim II)
20	GK	MAS	Haziq Nadzli
21	MF	MAS	Danial Amier (on loan from Johor Darul Ta'zim)

No.	Pos.	Nation	Player
22	MF	TLS	João Pedro
23	DF	MAS	Ariff Farhan Isa
25	MF	BHR	Moses Atede
27	DF	MAS	Filemon Anyie
28	FW	MAS	Jordan Mintah
29	FW	MAS	Zharmein Ashraf
35	DF	NGR	James Okwuosa (captain)
39	GK	MAS	Wan Azraie
44	MF	MAS	Alif Hassan
50	MF	MAS	Diego Baggio
55	GK	MAS	Shahril Saa'ri
60	DF	MAS	Yohanis Daniel
64	DF	MAS	Badrul Hisham
77	DF	MAS	Yuki Tanigawa
80	MF	MAS	Wesley Azcang Milkias
88	FW	MAS	Zahrul Nizwan
99	MF	JOR	Ahmad Israiwah

== Competitions ==
=== Overview ===
Competition	First match	Last match	Starting round	Final position	Record							
Competition	First match	Last match	Starting round	Final position	Pld	W	D	L	GF	GA	GD	Win %
Malaysia Super League	9 August 2025	17 May 2026	Matchday 1	2nd	24	16	5	3	45	14	+31	66.67
Malaysia FA Cup	16 August 2025	30 November 2025	Round of 16	Semi-finals	6	2	0	4	15	11	+4	33.33
Malaysia Cup	18 January 2026	23 May 2026	Round of 16	Runners-up	7	4	1	2	10	6	+4	57.14
Total					37	22	6	9	70	31	+39	59.46

Source: Competitions

=== Malaysia Super League ===
9 August 2025 1	Kuching City	4–0	Kelantan TRW	Kuching
20:15 MYT (UTC+8)	Ngah 6', 71'; João Pedro 18'; Ramadhan 90+3'	Report		Stadium: Sarawak State Stadium; Attendance: 3,141; Referee: Zamzaidi Katimin

24 August 2025 2	Kuching City	0–1	Johor Darul Ta'zim	Kuching
20:15 MYT (UTC+8)		Report		Stadium: Sarawak State Stadium; Attendance: 12,705; Referee: Razlan Jofri Ali

29 August 2025 3	Negeri Sembilan	2–2	Kuching City	Paroi
21:00 MYT (UTC+8)		Report	Danial 7'; Ngah 48'	Stadium: Tuanku Abdul Rahman Stadium; Attendance: 24,478; Referee: Mohammad Zamzaidi Katimin

21 September 2025 4	Kuching City	1–0	Selangor	Kuching
16:45 MYT (UTC+8)	Ramadhan 68'	Report		Stadium: Sarawak State Stadium; Attendance: 5,654; Referee: Tuan Mohd Yaasin Tuan Mohd Hanafiah

28 September 2025 5	Kuching City	4–0	Immigration	Kuching
20:15 MYT (UTC+8)	Ramadhan 30'; Danial 49', 65'; Shitembi 75'	Report		Stadium: Sarawak State Stadium; Attendance: 4,470; Referee: S. Logeswaran

4 October 2025 6	Sabah	0–1	Kuching City	Kota Kinabalu
20:15 MYT (UTC+8)		Report	Mintah 75'	Stadium: Likas Stadium; Attendance: 2,488; Referee: Mohamad Kamil Zakaria Ismail

25 October 2025 8	Kuching City	1–1	Penang	Kuching
20:45 MYT (UTC+8)	Fadzilah (yellow card) 29'; Ngah 45+7' (pen.)	Report	Tchétché 14'; Ra'op (yellow card) 50'; Brundo (yellow card) 90+3'	Stadium: Sarawak State Stadium

1 November 2025 9	PDRM	0–5	Kuching City	Selayang
21:00 MYT (UTC+8)	Fakhrul Azim (yellow card) 41'	Report	Tanigawa 13'; Ngah 20' 31' 37'; Saifullah 54' (pen.); Atede (yellow card) 90+2'	Stadium: Selayang Municipal Council Stadium

Pos	Team	Pld	W	D	L	GF	GA	GD	Pts	Qualification or relegation
1	Johor Darul Ta'zim (C)	24	23	1	0	117	10	+107	70	Qualification for the AFC Champions League Elite league stage & ASEAN Club Championship group stage
2	Kuching City	24	16	5	3	45	14	+31	53	Qualification for the AFC Champions League Two group stage & ASEAN Club Championship group stage (Note: Since the winners of the 2025 Malaysia FA Cup, Johor Darul Ta'zim, had already qualified for the Champions League Elite via league position, the Champions League Two spot was passed to the second-placed team.)
3	Selangor	24	16	4	4	59	20	+39	52	
4	Kuala Lumpur City	24	12	7	5	40	29	+11	43	
5	Terengganu	24	10	6	8	39	34	+5	36	

Updated to match(es) played on 17 May 2026. Source: Malaysian Football League
Rules for classification: 1) Points; 2) Goal difference; 3) Number of goals scored.
(C) Champions

=== Malaysia FA Cup ===
Round of 16

16 August 2025 First leg	DPMM (Brunei)	3–2	Kuching City	Bandar Seri Begawan
20:15	Azwan 5'; Oliveira 49'; Murray 79'	Report	Ngah 43'; Okwuosa 47'	Stadium: Hassanal Bolkiah National Stadium; Attendance: 396; Referee: Tuan Mohd Yaasin Tuan Mohd Hanafiah

14 September 2025 Second leg	Kuching City	7–1 (9–4 agg.)	(Brunei) DPMM	Kuching
20:15	Ngah 2', 53'; Danial 13', 78'; Yura 45+1' (o.g.); Ramadhan 59'; João Pedro 90+2'	Report		Stadium: Sarawak State Stadium; Attendance: 6,500; Referee: Mohd Fusser Mad Sallih

Quarter-finals

18 October 2025 First leg	Terengganu	1–4	Kuching City	Kuala Terengganu
21:00	Mabella 68'	Report	Ngah 9', 13'; Danial 53'; Mabella 82' (o.g.)	Stadium: Sultan Mizan Zainal Abidin Stadium; Referee: Mohd Hasrol Mohd Amir

28 October 2025 Second leg	Kuching City	1–2 (5–3 agg.)	Terengganu	Kuching
19:45	Ngah 32' (pen.) (yellow card) 61'; Okwuosa (yellow card) 41'	Report	Careca 12' (yellow card) 35' (goal) 90+2'	Stadium: Sarawak State Stadium

== Statistics ==
=== Appearances and goals ===
No.	Pos	Nat	Player	Total		Malaysia Super League		Malaysia FA Cup		Malaysia Cup	
No.	Pos	Nat	Player	Apps	Goals	Apps	Goals	Apps	Goals	Apps	Goals
Goalkeepers
1	GK	(Malaysia) MAS	Syafie Mursalim	0	0	0	0	0	0	0	0
20	GK	(Malaysia) MAS	Haziq Nadzli	35	0	21+1	0	6	0	7	0
39	GK	(Malaysia) MAS	Wan Azraie	2	0	1+1	0	0	0	0	0
55	GK	(Malaysia) MAS	Shahril Saa'ri	2	0	1+1	0	0	0	0	0
Defenders
2	DF	(Malaysia) MAS	Jimmy Raymond	35	0	13+9	0	5+1	0	5+2	0
3	DF	(Malaysia) MAS	Rodney Celvin	32	0	13+9	0	5	0	5	0
5	DF	(Philippines) PHI	Scott Woods	32	1	16+5	1	6	0	1+4	0
6	DF	(Malaysia) MAS	Arif Fadzilah	10	0	2+4	0	1+3	0	0	0
23	DF	(Malaysia) MAS	Ariff Farhan Isa	11	0	4+3	0	0	0	2+2	0
27	DF	(Malaysia) MAS	Filemon Anyie	12	0	1+6	0	0+3	0	0+2	0
35	DF	(Nigeria) NGR	James Okwuosa	35	3	23	1	5	1	7	1
60	DF	(Malaysia) MAS	Yohanis Daniel	0	0	0	0	0	0	0	0
77	DF	(Japan) JPN	Yuki Tanigawa	33	1	21	1	5	0	7	0
Midfielders
10	MF	(Namibia) NAM	Petrus Shitembi	37	5	24	3	6	1	7	1
21	MF	(Malaysia) MAS	Danial Amier	21	1	11+4	1	2	0	1+3	0
25	MF	(Bahrain) BHR	Moses Atede	35	0	19+3	0	6	0	7	0
44	MF	(Malaysia) MAS	Alif Hassan	13	0	2+5	0	0+2	0	0+4	0
50	MF	(Malaysia) MAS	Diego Baggio	7	0	1+4	0	0+2	0	0	0
80	MF	(Malaysia) MAS	Wesley Azcang Milkias	1	0	0	0	0+1	0	0	0
99	MF	(Jordan) JOR	Ahmad Israiwah	12	0	1+8	0	0	0	0+3	0
Forwards
7	FW	(Malaysia) MAS	Ramadhan Saifullah	35	9	22+1	7	6	1	6	1
8	FW	(Malaysia) MAS	Hazwan Bakri	8	0	1+5	0	0+2	0	0	0
11	FW	(Cameroon) CMR	Jerome Mpacko Etame	13	7	4+5	6	0	0	2+2	1
14	FW	(Malaysia) MAS	Amir Amri	0	0	0	0	0	0	0	0
17	FW	(Malaysia) MAS	Danial Asri	32	8	16+4	5	5	3	5+2	0
18	FW	(Cameroon) CMR	Ronald Ngah	34	22	23	13	5	6	5+1	3
19	FW	(Malaysia) MAS	Gabriel Nistelrooy	19	3	6+7	2	1+1	0	3+1	1
22	FW	(Timor-Leste) TLS	João Pedro	30	4	11+7	3	2+3	1	6+1	0
28	FW	(Malaysia) MAS	Jordan Mintah	21	2	4+9	2	0+3	0	1+4	0
29	FW	(Malaysia) MAS	Zharmein Ashraf	1	0	0	0	0	0	0+1	0
88	FW	(Malaysia) MAS	Zahrul Nizwan	5	0	1+3	0	0+1	0	0	0
Out On Loan
11	FW	(Malaysia) MAS	Shamie Iszuan	5	0	0+3	0	0+2	0	0	0
Players transferred out during the season
33	DF	(Spain) ESP	Gabriel Palmero	3	1	1+1	0	0	0	0+1	1

Last updated: 18 October 2025
Source: Competitions
