= 2019 Liga THB-KFA =

Liga THB-KFA
- Season: 2019
- Champions: Suka Menanti FC
- Matches: 90
- Goals: 323 (3.59 per match)

The 2019 Liga THB-KFA is the first season of the Liga THB-KFA, which is a Malaysian football competition featuring semi-professional and amateur clubs from Kedah.

== Teams ==
A total of 20 teams competed in the league. The Liga THB-KFA was played from July to September, in single round-robin format.

== Result ==
=== League table ===
==== North Zone ====
Pos	Team	Pld	W	D	L	GF	GA	GD	Pts	Promotion, qualification or relegation
1	Suka Menanti (C)	9	8	1	0	28	3	+25	25	Advance to Final
2	THB Wanderers	9	8	0	1	45	3	+42	24	
3	Padang Terap Jr.	9	5	2	2	19	13	+6	17	
4	Pokok Sena	9	5	2	2	15	11	+4	17	
5	MPKP	9	4	1	4	28	18	+10	13	
6	KIFA-MSIK	9	4	0	5	16	22	−6	12	
7	PG	9	3	2	4	19	16	+3	11	
8	Kubang Rotan	9	3	0	6	14	44	−30	9	
9	ILP Jitra	9	1	0	8	8	37	−29	3	
10	Pendidikan	9	0	0	9	0	28	−28	0	

Source: Liga THB-KFA
Rules for classification: 1) Points; 2) Goal difference; 3) Number of goals scored.
(C) Champions

==== South Zone ====
Pos	Team	Pld	W	D	L	GF	GA	GD	Pts	Promotion, qualification or relegation
1	Peqedu	9	8	0	1	23	10	+13	24	Advance to Final
2	MPKK	9	7	1	1	15	4	+11	22	
3	Yan	9	4	3	2	13	8	+5	15	
4	Belantik City	9	4	3	2	16	13	+3	15	
5	Baling MDB	9	4	1	4	18	16	+2	13	
6	TLJ	9	4	0	5	13	15	−2	12	
7	19 RAMD ATM	8	3	2	3	12	9	+3	11	
8	Arena	9	2	2	5	13	19	−6	8	
9	Padang Serai	9	1	1	7	6	15	−9	4	
10	POLIMAS	8	0	1	7	2	20	−18	1	

Source: Liga THB-KFA
Rules for classification: 1) Points; 2) Goal difference; 3) Number of goals scored.

== Final ==
3 September 2019
20:45 UTC+8

Suka Menanti FC	4–3	Peqedu FC
	Report

Darul Aman Stadium, Kedah
