= Akmal Zahir =

Malaysian footballer (born 1994)

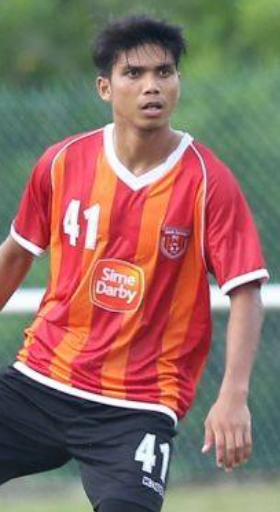
- Akmal playing for Sime Darby in 2016

Personal information
- Full name: Mohd Akmal bin Md Zahir
- Date of birth: 16 February 1994 (age 32)
- Place of birth: Alor Setar, Malaysia
- Height: 1.80 m (5 ft 11 in)
- Position: Centre-back

Team information
- Current team: Star City F.C.
- Number: 3

Senior career*
Years	Team	Apps	(Gls)
2016	Sime Darby		
2017	Melaka United		
2019	UKM	22	(1)
2020–2022	Melaka United	21	(0)
2022–2025	Kedah Darul Aman	42	(2)
2025–2026	Penang	6	(0)
- * Club domestic league appearances and goals as of July 2026

Mohd Akmal bin Md Zahir (born 16 February 1994) is a Malaysian professional footballer who plays as a centre-back.

== Club career ==
=== Sime Darby ===
On 1 April 2016, Akmal signed for Malaysia Premier League club Sime Darby senior team after getting promoted from the club Youth Team Sime Darby U21.

=== Melaka FA ===
On 30 November 2016, Akmal joined Malaysia Premier League club Melaka FA from Sime Darby on free transfer.

=== UKM ===
On 1 December 2017, Akmal signed for Malaysia Premier League club UKM FC from Melaka FA.

=== Melaka United ===
On 2 December 2019, Akmal signed for Malaysia Super League club Melaka United after leaving UKM FC on free transfer.

In December 2021, Akmal signed an extension contract with Melaka United after becoming key player of the club.

=== Kedah Darul Aman ===
On 4 June 2022, Akmal signed for Malaysia Super League club Kedah Darul Aman.

=== Penang FC ===
On 5 June 2025, Akmal signed for Malaysia Super League club Penang after three years with Kedah Darul Aman on a free transfer.

== Career statistics ==
As of 15 October 2022

=== Club ===
Club	Season	League		Cup		League Cup		Continental		Total	
Club	Season	Apps	Goals	Apps	Goals	Apps	Goals	Apps	Goals	Apps	Goals
Kedah Darul Aman	2022	9	0	1	0	2	0	4 (Note: Appearances in AFC Cup)	0	16	0
Kedah Darul Aman	2023	18	2	1	0	1	0	-		20	2
Kedah Darul Aman	2024–25	15	0	0	0	1	0	-		16	0
Kedah Darul Aman	Total	42	2	2	0	4	0	4	0	52	2
Penang	2025–26	3	0	0	0	1	0	0	0	4	0
Penang	Total	3	0	0	0	1	0	0	0	4	0
Career total		45	2	2	0	5	0	0	0	56	2

== Honours ==
Penang

- MFL Challenge Cup runner-up: 2026
