= 2025–26 PDRM FC season =

Polis Di-Raja Malaysia
2025–26 season
- CEO: Mohamad Hafiz Zainal Abidin
- Head coach: Eddy Gapil
- Stadium: MP Selayang Stadium
- Malaysia Super League: TBD
- Malaysia FA Cup: Round of 16
- Malaysia Cup: Round of 16
- MFL Challenge Cup: Quarter-finals
- Top goalscorer: League: Bernard Doumbia (4 goals); All: Bernard Doumbia (4 goals)

The 2025–26 season is Polis Di-Raja Malaysia Football Club's 35th season in the football club's history and 3rd season in the top flight of Malaysian football, Malaysia Super League since promoted in 2022. In addition to the domestic league, the club will also participate in the Malaysia FA Cup.

== Coaching staff ==
- Team manager: Shamshul Hisham Abd Razak
- Assistant head coach: Eddy Gapil
- Assistant coach: V. Kavi Chelvan
- Goalkeeper coach: Atfan Hat
- Fitness coach: Azraie Faozi

== Players ==
As of 14 August 2025

=== First-team squad ===
Note: Flags indicate national team as defined under FIFA eligibility rules; some limited exceptions apply. Players may hold more than one non-FIFA nationality.

| No. | Pos. | Nation | Player |
|---|---|---|---|
| 6 | MF | MYA | Kyaw Min Oo (captain) |
| 7 | MF | MAS | Irfan Fazail |
| 8 | FW | NGA | Elisha Kashim |
| 10 | MF | JOR | Ahmad Israiwah |
| 11 | FW | CIV | Bernard Doumbia |
| 13 | DF | MAS | Badrul Afendy Fadzli |
| 15 | MF | KOR | Park Tae-soo |
| 16 | MF | MAS | Syafiq Azmi |
| 17 | FW | MAS | Amirul Wa'ie |
| 18 | MF | MAS | Adam Farhan Mustaffa |
| 19 | DF | MAS | Amir Saiful Badeli |
| 20 | GK | MAS | Asri Muhamad |
| 21 | MF | MAS | Zazrir Naim |
| 22 | MF | MAS | Afiq Saluddin |

| No. | Pos. | Nation | Player |
|---|---|---|---|
| 23 | DF | CIV | Noel Agbre |
| 24 | MF | MAS | Hafiz A.Aziz |
| 26 | DF | MAS | Alif Naquiddin |
| 27 | MF | MAS | Imran Samso |
| 28 | GK | MAS | Fahmi Ikhwan |
| 29 | MF | MAS | Aiman Sufi |
| 30 | GK | MAS | Ifwat Akmal |
| 32 | MF | MAS | Safiee Ahmad |
| 34 | MF | MAS | Eizrul Ashraf |
| 46 | GK | MAS | Hakeem Hamidun |
| 47 | MF | MAS | Dick Chenny Waili |
| 66 | DF | MAS | Fakhrullah Yusoff |
| 77 | MF | JOR | Fadi Awad |
| 89 | MF | MAS | Fakhrul Azim |

== Competitions ==
=== Overview ===
| Competition | First match | Last match | Starting round | Final position | Record | | | | | | | |
| Competition | First match | Last match | Starting round | Final position | Pld | W | D | L | GF | GA | GD | Win % |
|---|---|---|---|---|---|---|---|---|---|---|---|---|
| Malaysia Super League | 9 August 2025 | 17 May 2026 | Matchday 1 | 13th | 24 | 2 | 5 | 17 | 17 | 79 | −62 | 8.33 |
| Malaysia FA Cup | 18 August 2025 | 12 September 2025 | Round of 16 | Round of 16 | 2 | 1 | 0 | 1 | 1 | 5 | −4 | 50.00 |
| Malaysia Cup | 18 January 2026 | 24 January 2026 | Round of 16 | Round of 16 | 2 | 0 | 0 | 2 | 1 | 11 | −10 | 0.00 |
| MFL Challenge Cup | 8 February 2026 | 15 February 2026 | Quarter-finals | Quarter-finals | 2 | 0 | 1 | 1 | 1 | 3 | −2 | 0.00 |
| Total | | | | | 30 | 3 | 6 | 21 | 20 | 98 | −78 | 10.00 |

Source: Competitions

=== Malaysia Super League ===
| 9 August 2025 1 | PDRM | 2–2 | (Brunei) DPMM | Selayang |
| 21:00 | Park 68', 72' | Report | | Stadium: Selayang Stadium; Attendance: 220; Referee: Mohamad Nawal Mohammad Zubir |

| 13 August 2025 2 | Terengganu | 2–2 | PDRM | Kuala Nerus |
| 21:00 | | Report | Doumbia 13', 56' | Stadium: Sultan Mizan Zainal Abidin Stadium; Attendance: 6,251; Referee: Muhammad Nazmi Nasaruddin |

| 23 August 2025 3 | PDRM | 0–0 | Melaka | Selayang |
| 21:00 | | Report | | Stadium: Selayang Stadium; Attendance: 380; Referee: Muhammad Izzul Fikri Kamaruzaman |

| 27 August 2025 4 | Kuala Lumpur City | 3–1 | PDRM | Cheras |
| 20:15 | Safawi 25'; Josué 53'; Dumitru 77' (pen.) | Report | Kyaw 90' | Stadium: Kuala Lumpur Stadium; Attendance: 616; Referee: Mohd Fusser Mad Sallih |

| 20 September 2025 5 | PDRM | 3–1 | Kelantan TRW | Selayang |
| 21:00 | Doumbia 27', 35'; Imran 55' | Report | Olusegun 45' (pen.) | Stadium: Selayang Stadium; Attendance: 1,957; Referee: S. Logeswaran |

| 5 October 2025 6 | PDRM | 0–7 | Johor Darul Ta'zim | Selayang |
| 21:00 | | Report | | Stadium: Selayang Stadium; Attendance: 3,120; Referee: Mohd Hasrol Mohd Amir |

| Pos | Team | Pld | W | D | L | GF | GA | GD | Pts | Qualification or relegation |
|---|---|---|---|---|---|---|---|---|---|---|
| 9 | Sabah | 24 | 5 | 8 | 11 | 29 | 44 | −15 | 23 | |
| 10 | DPMM | 24 | 6 | 5 | 13 | 30 | 57 | −27 | 23 | Ineligible for AFC competition spots |
| 11 | Melaka | 24 | 4 | 7 | 13 | 18 | 45 | −27 | 19 | |
| 12 | Kelantan The Real Warriors | 24 | 4 | 3 | 17 | 17 | 63 | −46 | 15 | |
| 13 | PDRM | 24 | 2 | 5 | 17 | 17 | 79 | −62 | 11 | |

Updated to match(es) played on 17 May 2026. Source: Malaysian Football League
Rules for classification: 1) Points; 2) Goal difference; 3) Number of goals scored.

=== Malaysia FA Cup ===
Round of 16

| 18 August 2025 First leg | Negeri Sembilan | 5–0 | PDRM | Paroi |
| 21:00 | | Report | | Stadium: Tuanku Abdul Rahman Stadium; Attendance: 4,506; Referee: Mohammad Zamzaidi Katimin |

| 12 September 2025 Second leg | PDRM | 1–0 (1–5 agg.) | Negeri Sembilan | Selayang |
| 21:00 | Fakhrul 4' | Report | | Stadium: Selayang Municipal Council Stadium; Attendance: 1,950; Referee: Mohamad Nawal Mohammad Zubir |

== Statistics ==
=== Appearances and goals ===
Includes all competitions. Players with no appearances not included in the list.

As of 5 October 2025

| No. | Pos | Nat | Player | Total | | Malaysia Super League | | Malaysia FA Cup | |
| No. | Pos | Nat | Player | Apps | Goals | Apps | Goals | Apps | Goals |
Goalkeepers
| 28 | GK | (Malaysia) MAS | Fahmi Ikhwan | 2 | 0 | 0+1 | 0 | 0+1 | 0 |
| 30 | GK | (Malaysia) MAS | Ifwat Akmal | 5 | 0 | 4 | 0 | 1 | 0 |
| 46 | GK | (Malaysia) MAS | Hakeem Hamidun | 3 | 0 | 2 | 0 | 1 | 0 |
Defenders
| 13 | DF | (Malaysia) MAS | Badrul Afendy | 7 | 0 | 3+2 | 0 | 1+1 | 0 |
| 19 | DF | (Malaysia) MAS | Amir Saiful | 8 | 0 | 6 | 0 | 1+1 | 0 |
| 21 | DF | (Malaysia) MAS | Zazrir Naim | 1 | 0 | 0+1 | 0 | 0 | 0 |
| 23 | DF | (Ivory Coast) CIV | Noel Agbre | 7 | 0 | 6 | 0 | 1 | 0 |
| 26 | DF | (Malaysia) MAS | Alif Naquiddin | 7 | 0 | 2+3 | 0 | 1+1 | 0 |
| 66 | DF | (Malaysia) MAS | Fakhrullah Yusoff | 1 | 0 | 0+1 | 0 | 0 | 0 |
Midfielders
| 7 | MF | (Malaysia) MAS | Irfan Fazail | 2 | 0 | 1+1 | 0 | 0 | 0 |
| 10 | MF | (Jordan) JOR | Ahmad Israiwah | 8 | 0 | 6 | 0 | 2 | 0 |
| 15 | MF | (South Korea) KOR | Park Tae-soo | 8 | 2 | 6 | 2 | 2 | 0 |
| 16 | MF | (Malaysia) MAS | Syafiq Azmi | 3 | 0 | 0+1 | 0 | 0+2 | 0 |
| 22 | MF | (Malaysia) MAS | Afiq Saluddin | 2 | 0 | 0+2 | 0 | 0 | 0 |
| 24 | MF | (Malaysia) MAS | Hafiz A.Aziz | 1 | 0 | 0 | 0 | 0+1 | 0 |
| 27 | MF | (Malaysia) MAS | Imran Samso | 8 | 1 | 3+3 | 1 | 2 | 0 |
| 29 | MF | (Malaysia) MAS | Aiman Sufi | 1 | 0 | 0+1 | 0 | 0 | 0 |
| 32 | MF | (Malaysia) MAS | Safiee Ahmad | 8 | 0 | 6 | 0 | 1+1 | 0 |
| 34 | MF | (Malaysia) MAS | Eizrul Ashraf | 6 | 0 | 0+4 | 0 | 1+1 | 0 |
| 77 | MF | (Jordan) JOR | Fadi Awad | 8 | 0 | 5+1 | 0 | 2 | 0 |
| 89 | MF | (Malaysia) MAS | Fakhrul Azim | 8 | 1 | 5+1 | 0 | 2 | 1 |
Forwards
| 8 | FW | (Nigeria) NGA | Elisha Kashim | 2 | 0 | 1+1 | 0 | 0 | 0 |
| 9 | FW | (Malaysia) MAS | Hadi Fayyadh | 3 | 0 | 1+1 | 0 | 1 | 0 |
| 11 | FW | (Ivory Coast) CIV | Bernard Doumbia | 7 | 4 | 5 | 4 | 2 | 0 |
| 17 | FW | (Malaysia) MAS | Amirul Wa'ie | 2 | 0 | 0+1 | 0 | 0+1 | 0 |
Players transferred/loaned out during the season
| 6 | DF | (Myanmar) MYA | Kyaw Min Oo | 5 | 1 | 4 | 1 | 1 | 0 |

Source: Competitions
