= Ifwat Akmal =

Malaysian footballer

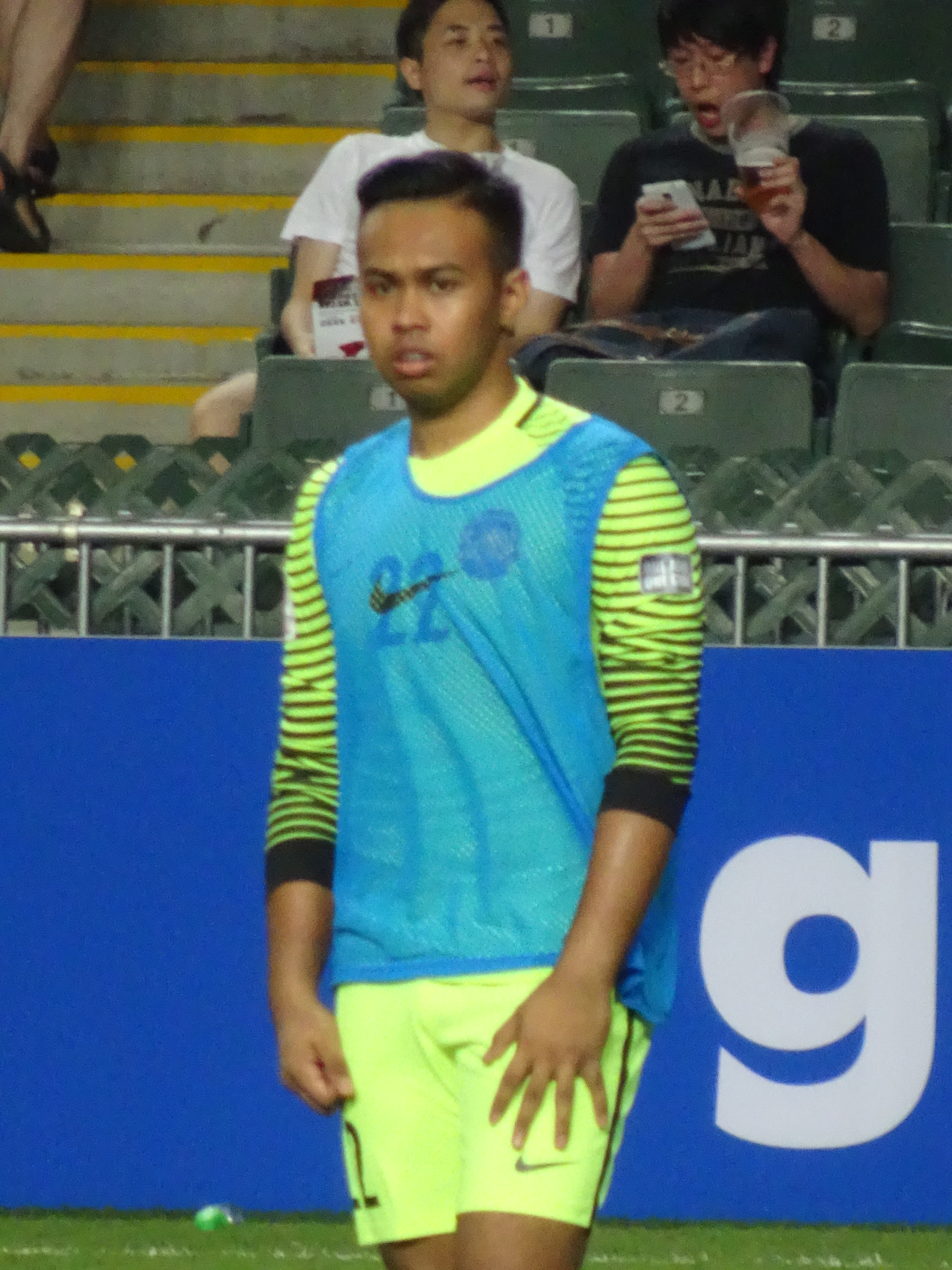
- Ifwat warming up for Malaysia in 2017 against Hong Kong

Personal information
- Full name: Mohd Ifwat Akmal bin Chek Kassim
- Date of birth: 10 August 1996 (age 30)
- Place of birth: Kedah, Malaysia
- Height: 1.78 m (5 ft 10 in)
- Position: Goalkeeper

Team information
- Current team: PDRM
- Number: 30

Youth career
- 2014–2015: Kedah Darul Aman U21

Senior career*
Years	Team	Apps	(Gls)
2016–2025	Kedah Darul Aman	90	(0)
2025–	PDRM	2	(0)

International career^{‡}
2016–2018	Malaysia U-23	8	(0)
2016–	Malaysia	2	(0)
Medal record
Malaysia under-23
Sea Games
Silver medal – second place	Sea Games 2017	Football
- * Club domestic league appearances and goals as of 13 August 2025 ‡ National team caps and goals as of 11 June 2019

Mohd Ifwat Akmal bin Chek Kassim (born 10 August 1996) is a Malaysian professional footballer who plays as goalkeeper for Malaysia Super League club PDRM and the Malaysia national team.

== Club career ==
=== Kedah Darul Aman ===
Ifwat began his career with Kedah Darul Aman U21 team which has competed in the President Cup.

Ifwat amazing performances in the 2017 Malaysia Super League earn him to win the 2017 league 'Best Goalkeeper Award'.

On 21 January 2020, he played in the 2020 AFC Champions League qualifying play-offs against Hong Kong side, Tai Po in which Kedah Darul Aman won 5–1.

== International career ==
On 6 August 2016, Ifwat make his Malaysia national team debut at the age of 19 in a friendly match against rivals, Indonesia where he played the entire 90th minute.

In June 2019, Ifwat was called up to the 2022 FIFA World Cup qualification match against Timor-Leste where he played the entire match in the second leg of the 2022 FIFA World Cup qualification – AFC first round in a 5–1 win.

== Career statistics ==
=== Club ===
As of 13 August 2025

Appearances and goals by club, season and competition
Club	Season	League			Cup		League Cup		Continental/Other		Total	
Club	Season	Division	Apps	Goals	Apps	Goals	Apps	Goals	Apps	Goals	Apps	Goals
Kedah Darul Aman	2016	Malaysia Super League	7	0	0	0	10	0	–		17	0
Kedah Darul Aman	2017	Malaysia Super League	15	0	6	0	7	0	–		28	0
Kedah Darul Aman	2018	Malaysia Super League	13	0	2	0	0	0	–		15	0
Kedah Darul Aman	2019	Malaysia Super League	18	0	6	0	9	0	–		33	0
Kedah Darul Aman	2020	Malaysia Super League	5	0	–		0	0	1 (Note: Appearances in AFC Champions League)	0	6	0
Kedah Darul Aman	2021	Malaysia Super League	7	0	–		3	0	–		10	0
Kedah Darul Aman	2022	Malaysia Super League	10	0	2	0	2	0	3 (Note: Appearances in AFC Cup)	0	17	0
Kedah Darul Aman	2023	Malaysia Super League	5	0	0	0	0	0	–		5	0
Kedah Darul Aman	2024–25	Malaysia Super League	10	0	0	0	1	0	3 (Note: Appearances in MFL Challenge Cup)	0	14	0
Kedah Darul Aman	Total		90	0	16	0	32	0	7	0	145	0
PDRM	2025–26	Malaysia Super League	2	0	0	0	0	0	–		2	0
PDRM	Total		2	0	0	0	0	0	0	0	2	0
Career total			80	0	16	0	31	0	4	0	131	0

== Honours ==
=== Club ===
Kedah Darul Aman

- Malaysia FA Cup: 2017, 2019
- Malaysia Cup: 2016
- Malaysia Charity Shield: 2017
- Malaysia Super League runner-up: 2020, 2021
- Malaysia Cup runner-up: 2017, 2019

=== International ===
Malaysia U-23

- Southeast Asian Games

(silver) Silver Medal: 2017

=== Individual ===
- Man Of The Match Malaysia FA Cup Final: 2019
- FAM Football Awards – Best Goalkeeper: 2017
- Malaysia Super League Team of the Season: 2019
- Kedah Sports Awards 2016 – Promising Athlete
- PFAM Player of the Month: March 2019
