= Amirul Hisyam Kechik =

Malaysian footballer

Personal information
- Full name: Muhammad Amirul Hisyam bin Awang Kechik
- Date of birth: 5 May 1995 (age 31)
- Place of birth: Kedah, Malaysia
- Height: 1.72 m (5 ft 7 1/2 in)
- Positions: Central midfielder; centre-back

Team information
- Current team: Penang
- Number: 77

Youth career
- 2011–2012: Malaysia U-17
- 2013: Kedah U-21
- 2013–2014: Harimau Muda C

Senior career*
Years	Team	Apps	(Gls)
2015	Harimau Muda B	16	(1)
2016–2025	Kedah Darul Aman	124	(3)
2025–	Penang	10	(0)

International career^{‡}
2010–2012	Malaysia U-17	9	(0)
2012–2015	Malaysia U-20	6	(0)
2015–2017	Malaysia U-23	15	(1)
2016–2017	Malaysia	3	(0)
Medal record
Malaysia under-23
SEA Games
Silver medal – second place	Kuala Lumpur 2017	Football
- * Club domestic league appearances and goals as of 9 January 2026 ‡ National team caps and goals as of 29 August 2017

Muhammad Amirul Hisyam bin Awang Kechik (born 5 May 1995) is a Malaysian professional footballer who plays as a central midfielder for Malaysia Super League club Penang and the Malaysia national team.

== Club career ==
Amirul was a product of the Tunku Anum state sports school in Kedah prior to joining Harimau Muda in 2013. While playing for the Tunku Anum sports school their team won the Minister of Education Challenge Cup for three years running. He was initially picked to join Kedah's 2013 President Cup squad but impressed coaches at a selection conducted by Harimau Muda C. He then went on to be part of Ong Kim Swee’s squad that played in the Queensland Premier League in 2014 and the 2015 Southeast Asian Games. In 2015, Amirul played in the S.League under Razip Ismail as the head coach.

On 4 December 2024, Amirul scored a stoppage time goal to rescue his team to a 1–1 draw to Perak.

== International career ==
Amirul has played for Malaysia in various age groups, and made his debut for the senior team in March 2016, in a 2018 FIFA World Cup qualification match against Saudi Arabia.

== Career statistics ==
=== Club ===
As of 5 June 2025

Club performance
Season	Club	League	Apps	Goals	Apps	Goals	Apps	Goals	Apps	Goals	Apps	Goals
Singapore			S.League		Cup		League Cup		Continental/Others		Total	
2015	Harimau Muda B	S.League	16	1	0	0	0	0	–		16	1
Total			16	1	0	0	0	0	0	0	16	1
Season	Club	League	League		FA Cup		Malaysia Cup		Continental/Others		Total	
2016	Kedah Darul Aman	Malaysia Super League	19	0	5	1	9	0	–		33	1
2017	Kedah Darul Aman	Malaysia Super League	13	0	2	0	9	0	–		24	0
2018	Kedah Darul Aman	Malaysia Super League	15	0	1	0	0	0	–		16	0
2019	Kedah Darul Aman	Malaysia Super League	10	0	4	0	2	0	–		16	0
2020	Kedah Darul Aman	Malaysia Super League	9	0	0	0	1	0	0	0	10	0
2021	Kedah Darul Aman	Malaysia Super League	20	1	0	0	5	0	–		25	1
2022	Kedah Darul Aman	Malaysia Super League	9	0	1	0	0	0	3	0	13	0
2023	Kedah Darul Aman	Malaysia Super League	14	0	0	0	2	0	–		16	0
2024–25	Kedah Darul Aman	Malaysia Super League	15	2	5	1	1	0	4 (Note: Appearances in MFL Challenge Cup)	2	25	5
Total			124	3	18	2	29	0	7	2	178	7
Career total			140	4	18	2	29	0	7	2	191	5

=== International Appearances ===
As of 22 March 2018

Malaysia national team
Year	Apps	Goals
2016	3	0
Total	3	0

== Honours ==
=== Club ===
Kedah Darul Aman

- Malaysia FA Cup: 2017, 2019
- Malaysia Cup: 2016
- Piala Sumbangsih : 2017

Penang

- MFL Challenge Cup runner-up: 2026

=== International ===
Malaysia U-23

- Southeast Asian Games

(silver) Silver Medal: 2017
