= Kamil Akmal Halim =

Malaysian footballer

Kamil Akmal
Personal information
- Full name: Muhamad Kamil Akmal bin Abd Halim
- Date of birth: 14 February 1999 (age 27)
- Place of birth: Jitra, Malaysia
- Height: 1.82 m (6 ft 0 in)
- Position: Left-back

Team information
- Current team: Kedah FA
- Number: 66

Youth career
- 2017–2021: Kedah Darul Aman U21

Senior career*
| Years | Team | Apps | (Gls) |
| 2022–2025 | Kedah Darul Aman | | |
- * Club domestic league appearances and goals

Muhamad Kamil Akmal bin Abd Halim (born 14 February 1999) is a Malaysian professional footballer who plays as a right-back.

== Club career ==
Originally from Jitra, Kedah, Kamil was in Kedah Darul Aman's youth team before being promoted to the first team in 2022.

== Career statistics ==
=== Club ===
As of 11 October 2022

Appearances and goals by club, season and competition
| Club | Season | League | | | Cup | | League Cup | | Continental | | Total | |
| Club | Season | Division | Apps | Goals | Apps | Goals | Apps | Goals | Apps | Goals | Apps | Goals |
|---|---|---|---|---|---|---|---|---|---|---|---|---|
| Kedah Darul Aman | 2022 | Malaysia Super League | 9 | 0 | 2 | 0 | 2 | 0 | 4 | 0 | 17 | 0 |
| Kedah Darul Aman | 2023 | Malaysia Super League | 0 | 0 | 0 | 0 | 0 | 0 | – | | 0 | 0 |
| Kedah Darul Aman | Total | | 9 | 0 | 2 | 0 | 2 | 0 | 4 | 0 | 17 | 0 |
| Career total | | | 0 | 0 | 0 | 0 | 0 | 0 | 0 | 0 | 0 | 0 |
