= 2022 Kedah Darul Aman F.C. season =

Kedah Darul Aman
2022 season
- Owner: Daud Bakar
- CEO: Khamal Idris Ali
- Head coach: Aidil Sharin
- Stadium: Darul Aman Stadium
- Malaysia Super League: 8th
- Malaysia FA Cup: Second round
- Malaysia Cup: Round of 16
- AFC Cup: Zonal semi-finals
- Top goalscorer: League: Ronald Ngah (12 goals); All: Ronald Ngah (13 goals)
Home colours	Away colours	Third colours

The 2022 season was Kedah Darul Aman's 14th season in the Malaysia Super League since the league's inception in 2004.

== Management Team ==
Position	Name
Head coach	(Singapore) Aidil Sharin
Assistant head coach	(Malaysia) Victor Andrag
First-team coach	(Malaysia) Abdul Hadi Abdul Hamid
Goalkeeper coach	(Malaysia) Khairul Azman Mohamed
Fitness coach	(Malaysia) KhairulAnwar
Team Doctor	(Malaysia) Dr. Jasminder Singh
Physiotherapist	(Malaysia) Muhammad Nur'Illya Samsuddin
Medical officer	(Malaysia) Mohd Shahrizal Mohd Nadzir

== Squad ==
No.	Name	Nat	Date of birth (age)	Last club	Contract since	Contract ends
Goalkeepers
1	Ifwat Akmal	(Malaysia)	10 August 1996 (age 29)	Youth team	2016	2022
30	Ilham Amirullah	(Malaysia)	26 February 1994 (age 31)	(Malaysia) Terengganu	2021	2022
55	Shahril Saa'ri	(Malaysia)	7 March 1990 (age 35)	(Malaysia) PDRM	2020	2022
Defenders
2	Akmal Zahir	(Malaysia)	16 February 1994 (age 31)	(Malaysia) Melaka United	2022	2022
3	Rodney Celvin	(Malaysia)	25 November 1996 (age 29)	(Malaysia) Selangor	2021	2023
5	Marc Vales	(Andorra)	4 April 1990 (age 35)	(Norway) Sandefjord	2022	2022
13	Loqman Hakim	(Malaysia)	22 January 1998 (age 28)	Youth team	2020	2022
15	Heshamudin Ahmad	(Malaysia)	15 February 1999 (age 26)	Youth team	2022	2022
17	Syazwan Tajudin	(Malaysia)	7 January 1994 (age 32)	(Malaysia) Kuala Lumpur City	2021	2022
23	Amirul Azhan	(Malaysia)	23 July 1993 (age 32)	(Malaysia) Perak	2022	2022
27	Ariff Farhan	(Malaysia)	14 July 1996 (age 29)	(Malaysia) FELDA United	2021	2022
33	Azmeer Aris	(Malaysia)	5 August 1999 (age 26)	(Malaysia) Penang	2022	2022
76	Fareez Fadzil	(Malaysia)		Youth team	2022	2022
Midfielders
4	Asnan Ahmad	(Malaysia)	3 May 1993 (age 32)	(Malaysia) Terengganu	2021	2022
8	Khairu Azrin	(Malaysia)	13 July 1991 (age 34)	(Malaysia) Penang	2022	2022
11	Al-Hafiz Harun	(Malaysia)	13 April 1994 (age 31)	(Malaysia) Penang	2022	2022
14	Amer Azahar	(Malaysia)	22 June 1995 (age 30)	(Malaysia) Penang	2022	2022
16	Amirul Hisyam	(Malaysia)	5 May 1995 (age 30)	(Malaysia) Harimau Muda B	2015	2022
20	Fadzrul Danel	(Malaysia)	14 January 1998 (age 28)	Youth team	2019	2022
21	Fayadh Zulkifli	(Malaysia)	14 September 1998 (age 27)	Youth team	2019	2022
22	Syazwan Zainon	(Malaysia)	13 November 1989 (age 36)	(Malaysia) Selangor	2021	2022
25	Dechi Marcel	(Ivory Coast)	12 November 1992 (age 33)	(Malaysia) Terengganu	2022	2022
39	Sanrawat Dechmitr	(Thailand)	3 August 1989 (age 36)	(Thailand) Bangkok United	2022	2022
66	Kamil Akmal	(Malaysia)		Youth team	2020	2021
77	Azamuddin Akil	(Malaysia)	16 April 1985 (age 40)	(Malaysia) Selangor	2019	2022
Strikers
10	Mahmoud Al-Mardi	(Jordan)	6 October 1993 (age 32)	(Bahrain) Al-Muharraq SC	2022	2022
18	Ronald Ngah	(Cameroon)	12 September 1991 (age 34)	(Jordan) Al-Salt	2022	2022
19	Aiman Afif	(Malaysia)	18 February 2001 (age 24)	Youth team	2020	2022
29	Afeeq Iqmal	(Malaysia)		Youth team	2020	2021
99	Fikhri Zulkiflee	(Malaysia)	22 January 1999 (age 27)	Youth team	2020	2021
Players who left / loan to other club during the season
6	Jang Suk-won	(South Korea)	11 August 1989 (age 36)	(Malaysia) Melaka United	2022	2022
10	Dennis Buschening	(Thailand)	2 March 1991 (age 34)	(Malaysia) UiTM	2022	2022
28	Syafiq Ahmad	(Malaysia)	28 June 1995 (age 30)	(Malaysia) Johor Darul Ta'zim	2022	2022

== Transfers and contracts ==
=== Transfers in ===
Pre-season

Position	Player	Transferred from	Ref
MF	(Malaysia) Farhan Roslan	(Malaysia) Perak	Loan Return
DF	(Malaysia) Hidhir Idris	(Malaysia) PDRM	Loan Return
DF	(Malaysia) Amirul Azhan	(Malaysia) Perak	Free
DF	(South Korea) Jang Suk-won	(Malaysia) Melaka United	Free
DF	(Malaysia) Rodney Celvin	(Malaysia) Selangor	Undisclosed; 2 years contract signed in 2021 till 2023
DF	(Malaysia) Azmeer Aris	(Malaysia) Penang	Free
DF	(Andorra) Marc Vales	(Norway) Sandefjord	Undisclosed; 1 years contract signed in 2021 till 2022
MF	(Malaysia) Amer Azahar	(Malaysia) Penang	Free
MF	(Malaysia) Al-Hafiz Harun	(Malaysia) Penang	Free
MF	(Ivory Coast) Dechi Marcel	(Malaysia) Terengganu	Free
MF	(Malaysia) Khairu Azrin Khazali	(Malaysia) Penang	Free
FW	(Cameroon) Ronald Ngah	(Jordan) Al-Salt	Free
FW	(Thailand) Dennis Buschening	(Malaysia) UiTM FC	Free

Mid-season

Position	Player	Transferred from	Ref
DF	(Malaysia) Akmal Zahir	(Malaysia) Melaka United	

Note 1: Farhan Roslan left the club after returning from loan.

=== Loan in ===
Pre-season

Position	Player	Transferred from	Ref
MF	(Malaysia) Syafiq Ahmad	(Malaysia) Johor Darul Ta'zim	Season Loan

Mid-season

Position	Player	Transferred from	Ref
MF	(Thailand) Sanrawat Dechmitr	(Thailand) Bangkok United	Season Loan

=== Transfers out ===
Pre-season

Position	Player	Transferred To	Ref
DF	(Malaysia) Rodney Celvin	(Malaysia) Selangor	Loan Return
MF	(Lebanon) Rabih Ataya	(Lebanon) Ahed	Loan Return
GK	(Malaysia) Wan Mohd Syazmin	(Malaysia) Sri Pahang	Free
DF	(Brazil) Renan Alves	(Indonesia) Barito Putera	Free
DF	(Malaysia) Rizal Ghazali	(Malaysia) Sabah	Free
DF	(Malaysia) Fairuz Zakaria	(Malaysia) Penang	Free
DF	(Malaysia) Fandi Othman	(Malaysia) Sri Pahang	Free
MF	(Japan) Tam Sheang Tsung	(Malaysia) Penang	Free
MF	(Malaysia) Baddrol Bakhtiar	(Malaysia) Sabah	Free
MF	(Singapore) Anumanthan Kumar	(Singapore) Lion City Sailors	Free
MF	(Malaysia) Farhan Roslan	(Malaysia) Kelantan	Free
FW	(Liberia) Kpah Sherman	(Malaysia) Terengganu	Free
FW	(Ivory Coast) Kipré Tchétché	(Malaysia) Terengganu	Free
FW	(Malaysia) Faizat Ghazli	(Malaysia) Penang	Free

Mid-season

Position	Player	Transferred To	Ref
DF	(South Korea) Jang Suk-won	Unattached	Released

=== Loan Out ===
Pre-season

Position	Player	Transferred To	Ref
DF	(Malaysia) Hidhir Idris	(Malaysia) Kuching City	Season loan

=== Loan Return ===
Mid-season

Position	Player	Transferred To	Ref
MF	(Malaysia) Syafiq Ahmad	(Malaysia) Johor Darul Ta'zim	Season Loan

=== Retained / Promoted ===
Pos	Player	Source
GK	(Malaysia) Shahril Saa'ri	1 year contract signed in 2021 till 2022
GK	(Malaysia) Ifwat Akmal	1 year contract signed in 2021 till 2022
GK	(Malaysia) Shahril Saa'ri	1 year contract signed in 2021 till 2022
DF	(Malaysia) Loqman Hakim	1 year contract signed in 2021 till 2022
DF	(Malaysia) Ariff Farhan	1 year contract signed in 2021 till 2022
DF	(Malaysia) Syazwan Tajudin	1 year contract signed in 2021 till 2022
DF	(Malaysia) Fareez Fadzil	1 year contract (U21) promoted
DF	(Malaysia) Heshamudin Ahmad	1 year contract (U21) promoted
MF	(Malaysia) Fadzrul Danel	1 year contract signed in 2021 till 2022
MF	(Malaysia) Fayadh Zulkifli	1 year contract signed in 2021 till 2022
MF	(Malaysia) Azamuddin Akil	1 year contract signed in 2021 till 2022
MF	(Malaysia) Aiman Afif	1 year contract signed in 2021 till 2022
MF	(Malaysia) Syazwan Zainon	1 year contract signed in 2021 till 2022
MF	(Malaysia) Asnan Ahmad	1 year contract signed in 2021 till 2022
MF	(Malaysia) Amirul Hisyam	1 year contract signed in 2021 till 2022
MF	(Malaysia) Kamil Akmal	1 year contract (U21) promoted
FW	(Malaysia) Fikhri Zulkiflee	1 year contract (U21) promoted
FW	(Malaysia) Afeeq Iqmal	1 year contract (U21) promoted

== Friendlies ==
=== Pre-season ===
24 January 2022 1	Kedah Darul Aman (Malaysia)	9–0	(Malaysia) MADA	Alor Setar
	Syafiq Ahmad; Ronald Ngah; Fayadh Zulkifli; Khairu Azrin; Afeeq Iqmal; Rodney Celvin			Stadium: Padang Mada

26 January 2022 2	Kedah Darul Aman (Malaysia)	1–0	(Malaysia) Kedah Darul Aman U21	Alor Setar
	Syafiq Ahmad			Stadium: Padang UUM Sintok

30 January 2022 3	Kedah Darul Aman (Malaysia)	5–0	(Malaysia) Respect	Alor Setar
	Dennis Buschening 38' (pen.) 65'; Ronald Ngah 43' (pen.); Jang Suk-won 70'; Fayadh Zulkifli 85'			Stadium: Padang UUM Sintok

1 February 2022 4	Kedah Darul Aman (Malaysia)	3–0	(Malaysia) Langkawi City	Alor Setar
	Afeeq Iqmal 20'; Fayadh Zulkifli 55'; Al-Hafiz Harun 65'			Stadium: Stadium Sultan Abdul Halim

Tour of Klang Valley (4–9 February)

5 February 2022 5 (KV Tour)	Kedah Darul Aman (Malaysia)	2–0	(Malaysia) PIB	Bukit Jelutong
	Azamuddin Akil 35'; Ronald Ngah 80' (pen.)			Stadium: Padang Sime Darby

7 February 2022 6 (KV Tour)	Kedah Darul Aman (Malaysia)	2–1	(Malaysia) PDRM	Bukit Jelutong
	Dennis Buschening 38'; Al-Hafiz Harun 45'		Mirbek Akhmataliev 75'	Stadium: Padang Sime Darby

9 February 2022 7 (KV Tour)	Kedah Darul Aman (Malaysia)	1–1	(Malaysia) UiTM	Shah Alam
	Amer Azahar 67'		Azridin Rosli 45'	Stadium: UiTM Stadium

Tour of Sabah - SMJ Cup (10–19 February)

12 February 2022 8 (SMJ Cup)	Kedah Darul Aman (Malaysia)	3–0	(Malaysia) Sarawak United	Kota Kinabalu
	Syafiq Ahmad 45'; Fayadh Zulkifli 84'; Dechi Marcel 90'			Stadium: Likas Stadium

15 February 2022 9 (SMJ Cup)	Kedah Darul Aman (Malaysia)	1–0	(Malaysia) Kelantan	Kota Kinabalu
	Ronald Ngah 63'			Stadium: Likas Stadium

18 February 2022 10 (SMJ Cup)	Kedah Darul Aman (Malaysia)	0–1	(Malaysia) Sabah	Kota Kinabalu
			Neto Pessoa 52'	Stadium: Likas Stadium

Others

26 February 2022 11	Kedah Darul Aman (Malaysia)	0–0	(Malaysia) Penang	Alor Setar
				Stadium: Darul Aman Stadium

Mid-season

6 June 2022 1	Penang (Malaysia)	1–1	(Malaysia) Kedah Darul Aman	George Town
	Faizat Ghazli		Ronald Ngah	Stadium: City Stadium, Penang

10 June 2022 2	Kedah Darul Aman (Malaysia)	0–0	(Malaysia) Perak	Alor Setar
				Stadium: Darul Aman Stadium

== Competitions ==
=== Malaysia Super League ===
==== Fixtures and results ====
Win Draw Loss

4 March 2022 1	Sarawak United	0–1	Kedah Darul Aman	Kuching
			Ronald Ngah 17'	Stadium: Sarawak Stadium; Attendance: 1,357; Referee: S. Logeswaran

9 March 2022 2	Kedah Darul Aman	3–2	Kuala Lumpur City	Alor Setar
	Syafiq Ahmad 32'; Fayadh Zulkifli 68'; Dennis Buschening 69'		Zhafri Yahya 29'; Fayadh Zulkifli 88'	Stadium: Darul Aman Stadium; Attendance: 2,555; Referee: Hamdan bin Awang

6 April 2022 3	Kedah Darul Aman	1–0	Sri Pahang	Alor Setar
	Rodney Celvin 55'			Stadium: Darul Aman Stadium; Attendance: 2,520; Referee: Hasrol Amir

10 April 2022 4	Selangor	4–1	Kedah Darul Aman	Petaling Jaya
	Mukhairi 26'; Caion 34', 87'; Hakim 84'; Zahril (yellow card) 90+5'	Report (1); Report (2)		Stadium: MBPJ Stadium; Attendance: 2,655; Referee: Kamil Zakaria

17 April 2022 5	Penang	1–2	Kedah Darul Aman	Penang
	Hilal El-Helwe 16'		Ronald Ngah 62', 65'	Stadium: City Stadium; Attendance: 5,330; Referee: Amzaidi Katimin

24 April 2022 6	Sabah	4–0	Kedah Darul Aman	Kota Kinabalu
	Mohd Amri Yahyah 51', 61', 71'; Park Tae-soo 56'			Stadium: Likas Stadium; Attendance: 3,177; Referee: Fitri Maskon

6 May 2022 7	Kedah Darul Aman	2–3	Melaka United	Alor Setar
	Ronald Ngah 20'; Syafiq Ahmad 37'		Ifedayo Olusegun 23', 90+2'; Emmanuel Oti Essigba 78'	Stadium: Darul Aman Stadium; Attendance: 6,148; Referee: S. Logeswaran

11 May 2022 8	Petaling Jaya City	3–3	Kedah Darul Aman	Petaling Jaya
	Darren Lok 29'; Mahalli Jasuli 77'; Khyril Muhymeen 83'		Ronald Ngah 20', 33', 65'	Stadium: Petaling Jaya Stadium; Attendance: 685; Referee: Nafeez Abdul Wahab

17 May 2022 9	Kedah Darul Aman	0–0	Negeri Sembilan	Alor Setar
				Stadium: Darul Aman Stadium; Attendance: 3,495; Referee: Fusser Sallih

4 October 2022 10^{R}	Kedah Darul Aman	1-3	Johor Darul Ta'zim	Alor Setar
	Ronald Ngah 12'		Bergson 37' (red card) 45'; Velázquez 60' (pen.); Afiq 79'	Stadium: Darul Aman Stadium; Attendance: 14,954; Referee: Hamdan bin Awang

15 July 2022 11	Terengganu	2–1	Kedah Darul Aman	Terengganu
	Kpah Sherman 13'; Manny Ott 57'		Azamuddin Akil 90+3'	Stadium: Sultan Ismail Nasiruddin Shah Stadium; Attendance: 6,336; Referee: S. Logeswaran

19 July 2022 12	Kedah Darul Aman	3–1	Sarawak United	Alor Setar
	Al-Mardi 9', 80'; Ronald Ngah 75'		Uche Agba 53'	Stadium: Darul Aman Stadium; Attendance: 1,372; Referee: Razlan Joffri Ali

27 July 2022 13	Kuala Lumpur City	2–1	Kedah Darul Aman	Kuala Lumpur
	Jordan Mintah 56' (pen.), 72'		Aiman Afif 41'	Stadium: Kuala Lumpur Stadium; Attendance: 1,891; Referee: Usaid Jamal

1 August 2022 14	Sri Pahang	2–0	Kedah Darul Aman	Kuantan
	Andrés Steven Rodríguez Ossa 32', 67'			Stadium: Darul Makmur Stadium; Attendance: 2,314; Referee: Amirul Izwan Yaacob

14 September 2022 15^{R}	Kedah Darul Aman	3–1	Selangor	Alor Setar
	Ronald Ngah 23'; Marc Vales 30'; Fayadh Zulkifli 90+5'		Caion 33'	Stadium: Darul Aman Stadium; Attendance: 5,079; Referee: Hamdan bin Awang

1 September 2022 16^{R}	Kedah Darul Aman	1–0	Penang	Alor Setar
	Ronald Ngah 56'			Stadium: Darul Aman Stadium; Attendance: 3,765; Referee: S. Logeswaran

17 August 2022 17^{R}	Kedah Darul Aman	1–1	Sabah	Alor Setar
	Ronald Ngah 7'		Farhan Roslan 84'	Stadium: Darul Aman Stadium

9 September 2022 18^{R}	Melaka United	0–3	Kedah Darul Aman	Malacca
			Al-Mardi 13', 89'; Fayadh Zulkifli 84'	Stadium: Hang Jebat Stadium

1 October 2022 19^{R}	Kedah Darul Aman	0–1	Petaling Jaya City	Alor Setar
			Ruventhiran Vengadesan 68'	Stadium: Darul Aman Stadium

8 October 2022 20^{R}	Negeri Sembilan	4–3	Kedah Darul Aman	Paroi
	Matheus Alves 25'; Gustavo 59' 71'; Sean Eugene Selvaraj 66'		Al-Mardi 45+3'; Sanrawat Dechmitri 83'; Marc Vales 90'	Stadium: Tuanku Abdul Rahman Stadium

11 October 2022 21^{R}	Johor Darul Ta'zim	4–1	Kedah Darul Aman	Johor
	Bergson 50' (pen) 89'; Syafiq Ahmad 63' 67'		Ronald Ngah 45'	Stadium: Sultan Ibrahim Stadium

15 October 2022 22^{R}	Kedah Darul Aman	1–3	Terengganu	Alor Setar
	Dechi Marcel 88'		Faisal Halim 4'; Kipré Tchétché 18' 74'	Stadium: Darul Aman Stadium

- ^{R} = Rescheduled matches

==== League table ====
Pos	Team	Pld	W	D	L	GF	GA	GD	Pts	Qualification or relegation
6	Kuala Lumpur City	22	8	5	9	30	31	−1	29	
7	Sri Pahang	22	8	4	10	33	31	+2	28	
8	Kedah Darul Aman	22	8	3	11	32	41	−9	27	
9	Petaling Jaya City (D, R)	22	6	8	8	22	30	−8	26	Withdrawn from Liga Super and dissolved. (Note: Petaling Jaya City withdrew from Liga Super before the start of 2023 season.)
10	Melaka United (D, R)	22	4	6	12	22	43	−21	18 (Note: MFL officially snubs Melaka United and Sarawak United club licensing approval, as both clubs have problem with overdue payments of staffs or players. This decision prevented both from playing in 2023 Malaysian Super League. As of November 2nd, there are still no appeal from both clubs to continue the league structure by playing in M5 League.)	Ejected from Malaysian Super League and dissolved.

Updated to match(es) played on unknown. Source: MFL
Rules for classification: 1) Points; 2) Goal difference; 3) Number of goals scored.
(D) Disqualified; (R) Relegated

=== Malaysia FA Cup ===
12 March 2022 First round	Kedah Darul Aman	4–0	SAINS	Alor Setar
21:00 UTC+8	Fayadh Zulkifli 18', 47'; Amer Azahar 50', 60'			Stadium: Darul Aman Stadium; Attendance: 1,333; Referee: Mohd Fusser Mad Sallih

6 July 2022 Second round	Terengganu	1–0	Kedah Darul Aman	Kuala Terengganu
	Nasir 7'	Report		Stadium: Sultan Mizan Zainal Abidin Stadium; Attendance: 11,689; Referee: Mond Amirul Izwan Yaacob

=== Malaysia Cup ===
Round of 16

26 Oct 2022 First leg	Kedah Darul Aman	1–2	Negeri Sembilan	Alor Setar
	Fayadh Zulkifli 7'	Report	Che Rashid 42'; Matheus Alves 67'	Stadium: Darul Aman Stadium; Attendance: 3,118; Referee: Nazmi Nasaruddin

1 Nov 2022 Second leg	Negeri Sembilan	0–0 (2–1 agg.)	Kedah Darul Aman	Paroi
				Stadium: Tuanku Abdul Rahman Stadium; Attendance: 8,350; Referee: Razlan Joffri Ali

=== AFC Cup ===
Win Draw Loss

==== Group stage ====
Pos	Team	Pld	W	D	L	GF	GA	GD	Pts	Qualification	KED	VIS	BAL	KAY
1	(Malaysia) Kedah Darul Aman	3	2	0	1	9	4	+5	6 (Note: Head-to-head standings: Tied on head-to-head points.; Head-to-head goal difference: Kedah Darul Aman: +2, Visakha FC –1, Bali United –1.; Head-to-head goals scored: Visakha FC 6, Bali United 4.)	Zonal semi-finals	—	5–1	—	4–1
2	(Cambodia) Visakha FC	3	2	0	1	8	8	0	6		—	—	5–2	—
3	(Indonesia) Bali United (H)	3	2	0	1	5	5	0	6		2–0	—	—	—
4	(Philippines) Kaya F.C.–Iloilo	3	0	0	3	2	7	−5	0		—	1–2	0–1	—

Source: AFC
Rules for classification: Tiebreakers
(H) Hosts
Notes:

24 June 2022 1	Bali United (Indonesia)	2–0	(Malaysia) Kedah Darul Aman	Denpasar
		Report	Ngah 45+2' (o.g.); Rahmat 82'	Stadium: Kapten I Wayan Dipta Stadium; Attendance: 9,832; Referee: Akhrol Riskullaev (Uzbekistan)

27 June 2022 2	Kedah Darul Aman (Malaysia)	4–1	(Philippines) Kaya	Denpasar
	Fayadh 57', 90+3'; Al-Mardi 63'; Ngah 82'	Report	Gayoso 86'	Stadium: Kapten I Wayan Dipta Stadium, Gianyar; Attendance: 100; Referee: Payam Heidari (Iran)

30 June 2022 3	Kedah Darul Aman (Malaysia)	5–1	(Cambodia) Visakha	Denpasar
	Al-Mardi 28', 45+2', 54'; Fayadh 67'; Ngah 76'	Report	Khan 20'	Stadium: Kapten I Wayan Dipta Stadium; Attendance: 100; Referee: Ahmed Al-Ali (Jordan)

==== Knockout ====
9 August 2022 Zonal semi-finals	PSM Makassar (Indonesia)	2–1	(Malaysia) Kedah Darul Aman	Makassar
	Yakob 31'; Yuran 54'	Report	Fayadh 86'	Stadium: Andi Mattalatta Stadium; Referee: Akhrol Risquallev (Uzbekistan)

== Statistics ==
=== Appearances and goals ===
Players with no appearances not included in the list.

As of match played 27 Oct 2022

No.	Pos.	Name	League		FA Cup		Malaysia Cup		AFC Cup		Total	
No.	Pos.	Name	Apps	Goals	Apps	Goals	Apps	Goals	Apps	Goals	Apps	Goals
1	GK	(Malaysia) Ifwat Akmal	10	0	2	0	2	0	3	0	15	0
2	DF	(Malaysia) Akmal Zahir	9	0	1	0	2	0	4	0	11	0
3	DF	(Malaysia) Rodney Celvin	14+2	1	1	0	0	0	4	0	18	1
4	MF	(Malaysia) Asnan Ahmad	1+3	0	1	0	0	0	0+2	0	7	0
5	DF	(Andorra) Marc Vales	13+1	2	0	0	2	0	0	0	11	1
8	MF	(Malaysia) Khairu Azrin	8+6	0	0+1	0	0	0	0+1	0	15	0
10	FW	(Jordan) Mahmoud Al-Mardi	11	5	1	0	2	0	4	4	13	8
11	MF	(Malaysia) Al-Hafiz Harun	13+4	0	1+1	0	0+1	0	1+3	0	19	0
13	DF	(Malaysia) Loqman Hakim	3+3	0	1	0	0	0	0	0	6	0
14	MF	(Malaysia) Amer Azahar	4+6	0	1	2	0	0	0	0	8	2
15	DF	(Malaysia) Heshamudin Ahmad	4+3	0	1	0	0+2	0	0+1	0	6	0
16	MF	(Malaysia) Amirul Hisyam	3+4	0	1	0	0	0	2+1	0	11	0
17	DF	(Malaysia) Syazwan Tajudin	0	0	0+1	0	0	0	0	0	2	0
18	FW	(Cameroon) Ronald Ngah	20	12	1	0	2	0	4	2	22	13
19	FW	(Malaysia) Aiman Afif	1+2	1	1	0	2	0	2	0	4	1
20	MF	(Malaysia) Fadzrul Danel	4+9	0	2	0	1+1	0	1+3	0	15	0
21	MF	(Malaysia) Fayadh Zulkifli	6+12	4	1+1	2	2	1	0+4	4	20	10
22	MF	(Malaysia) Syazwan Zainon	11+3	0	0	0	0	0	2+1	0	14	0
23	DF	(Malaysia) Amirul Azhan	5+2	0	1	0	0	0	0	0	5	0
25	MF	(Ivory Coast) Dechi Marcel	13+1	1	1	0	2	0	3	0	14	0
27	MF	(Malaysia) Ariff Farhan	15+1	0	0+1	0	2	0	1	0	15	0
29	FW	(Malaysia) Afeeq Iqmal	0+3	0	0+1	0	0+2	0	0+1	0	4	0
30	GK	(Malaysia) Ilham Amirullah	5+1	0	0+1	0	0	0	0	0	5	0
33	DF	(Malaysia) Azmeer Aris	8+5	0	2	0	0	0	3	0	16	0
39	MF	(Thailand) Sanrawat Dechmitr	12	1	1	0	1+1	0	4	0	13	0
55	GK	(Malaysia) Shahril Saa'ri	7+2	0	0	0	0	0	1	0	8	0
66	MF	(Malaysia) Kamil Akmal	5+3	0	1+1	0	2	0	3+1	0	12	0
76	DF	(Malaysia) Fareez Fadzil	0	0	0+1	0	0	0	0	0	1	0
77	MF	(Malaysia) Azamuddin Akil	4+5	1	0	0+1	0	0	2+1	0	11	1
99	FW	(Malaysia) Fikhri Zulkiflee	0	0	0	0	0+1	0	0	0	0	0
Players transferred out during the season
6	DF	(South Korea) Jang Suk-won	8	0	0	0	0	0	0	0	8	0
10	FW	(Thailand) Dennis Buschening	2	1	0	0	0	0	0	0	2	1
28	FW	(Malaysia) Syafiq Ahmad	8+1	2	0	0	0	0	0	0	9	2
