= Liga THB-KFA =

Malaysia regional level football league

- Founded: 2019; 7 years ago
- Country: Malaysia
- Confederation: AFC
- Divisions: North Division; South Division
- Number of clubs: North Division: 10; South Division: 10
- Level on pyramid: 4
- Promotion to: Malaysia A2 Amateur League
- Domestic cup(s): Malaysia FA Cup; THB-KFA FA Cup
- Current champions: 2019 Suka Menanti FC (1 title)

Liga THB-KFA is a regional football league in Kedah, Malaysia. The league is managed by the football authority in Kedah, the Kedah Football Association (KFA). As part of a sponsorship deal with THB Maintenance SDH BHD, it was renamed as Liga THB-KFA. The league is at level 4 of the Malaysian football league system. Teams from this league entered the Malaysia FAM Cup, and champions go to the Malaysia A2 Amateur League.
