= Ariff Farhan =

Malaysian footballer

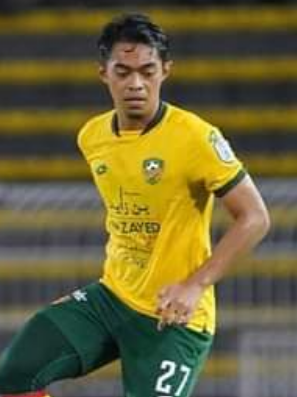

Personal information
- Full name: Muhammad Ariff Farhan bin Md Isa
- Date of birth: 14 July 1996 (age 30)
- Place of birth: Kedah, Malaysia
- Height: 1.68 m (5 ft 6 in)
- Position: Left back

Team information
- Current team: Penang
- Number: 27

Youth career
- 2011–2012: Bukit Jalil Sports School

Senior career*
Years	Team	Apps	(Gls)
2012–2015	Harimau Muda A	27	(3)
2016–2018	Kedah Darul Aman	31	(2)
2019	PKNS	5	(0)
2020	Felda United	10	(1)
2021–2024	Kedah Darul Aman	88	(2)
2025–	Penang	6	(0)

International career^{‡}
2012–2017	Malaysia U-21	3	(1)
2013–2019	Malaysia U-23	10	(1)
2021–	Malaysia	4	(0)
Medal record
Malaysia under-23
Sea Games
Silver medal – second place	Sea Games 2017	Football
- * Club domestic league appearances and goals as of 9 January 2026 ‡ National team caps and goals as of 17 November 2026

Muhammad Ariff Farhan bin Md Isa (born 14 July 1996) is a Malaysian professional footballer who plays as a left-back for Malaysia Super League club Penang and the Malaysia national team. In October 2012, he became the youngest player to appear in that league at just 16 surpassing the previous record set by former Young Lions starlet Hariss Harun.

== Career ==
=== Harimau Muda A ===
Farhan attended Bukit Jalil Sports School at the age of 13 years. Then, he was selected into Bukit Jalil Sports School football team to participate in the President Cup Malaysia.

He was selected by the Harimau Muda A coach, Ong Kim Swee into Malaysia Under-22 for the 2013 AFC U-22 Asian Cup qualification. He was the youngest footballer in the tournament which just 16 years old.

After shows and outstanding performances in the tournament, he was added into Harimau Muda A squad competing in the S.League. He made his debut as a late substitute in the match against Balestier Khalsa on 7 October 2012 to become the youngest player ever to appear in the S.League, and started the game on 2 November in which Tampines Rovers defeated Harimau Muda A to confirm their S.League title.

=== Penang ===
On 9 June 2025, Farhan signed for Malaysia Super League club Penang from Kedah Darul Aman on free transfer.

== International career ==
Farhan made his international debut for Malaysia Under-22 in the 2013 AFC U-22 Asian Cup qualification and 2012 SCTV Cup.

== Career statistics ==
=== Club ===
As of match played 9 January 2026

Appearances and goals by club, season and competition
Club	Season	League			Cup		League Cup		Others		Total	
Club	Season	Division	Apps	Goals	Apps	Goals	Apps	Goals	Apps	Goals	Apps	Goals
Kedah Darul Aman	2016	Malaysia Super League	14	0	2	0	6	0	–		22	0
Kedah Darul Aman	2017	Malaysia Super League	6	1	0	0	9	0	–		15	1
Kedah Darul Aman	2018	Malaysia Super League	11	1	2	0	0	0	–		13	1
Kedah Darul Aman	Total		31	2	4	0	15	0	0	0	50	2
PKNS	2019	Malaysia Super League	5	0	1	0	1	0	–		7	0
PKNS	Total		5	0	1	0	1	0	0	0	7	0
Felda United	2020	Malaysia Super League	10	1	0	0	0	0	–		10	1
Felda United	Total		10	1	0	0	0	0	0	0	10	1
Kedah Darul Aman	2021	Malaysia Super League	15	0	0	0	4	0	–		19	0
Kedah Darul Aman	2022	Malaysia Super League	17	0	1	0	0	0	1 (Note: Appearance in AFC Cup)	0	19	0
Kedah Darul Aman	2023	Malaysia Super League	23	2	1	0	2	0	–		26	2
Kedah Darul Aman	2024–25	Malaysia Super League	23	0	5	0	1	0	4 (Note: Appearances in MFL Challenge Cup)	0	33	0
Kedah Darul Aman	Total		88	2	7	0	7	0	5	0	103	2
Penang	2025-26	Malaysia Super League	6	0	0	0	3	0	–		9	0
Penang	Total		6	0	0	0	3	0	0	0	9	0
Career total			140	5	12	0	26	0	5	0	183	5

== Honours ==
=== Club ===
Kedah Darul Aman:

- Malaysia Cup: 2016
- Malaysian FA Cup: 2017
- Malaysia Charity Shield: 2017

=== International ===
Malaysia U-23

- Southeast Asian Games

(silver) Silver Medal: 2017
