= Dechi Marcel N'Guessan =

Ivorian footballer (born 1991)

Dechi Marcel
Personal information
- Full name: Dechi Marcel N'Guessan
- Date of birth: 12 November 1991 (age 34)
- Place of birth: Ivory Coast
- Height: 1.64 m (5 ft 5 in)
- Position: Midfielder

Team information
- Current team: Kuching City
- Number: 79

Senior career*
Years	Team	Apps	(Gls)
2016	Bingerville	0	(0)
2017–2018	UiTM	35	(1)
2019–2020	Terengganu II	12	(0)
2021	Terengganu	20	(2)
2022	Kedah Darul Aman	17	(1)
2023	Kuching City	1	(0)
- * Club domestic league appearances and goals as of 15 October 2022

Dechi Marcel N'Guessan (born 12 November 1991) is an Ivorian professional footballer who plays as a midfielder for Malaysia Super League club Kuching City.

== Club career ==
=== Kedah ===
On 16 December 2021, Dechi Marcel agreed to join Malaysia Super League side Kedah Darul Aman.

== Career statistics ==
=== Club ===
As of 15 October 2022

Appearances and goals by club, season and competition
Club	Season	League			Cup		League Cup		Continental		Total	
Club	Season	Division	Apps	Goals	Apps	Goals	Apps	Goals	Apps	Goals	Apps	Goals
Kedah Darul Aman	2022	Malaysia Super League	17	1	1	0	0	0	3	0	21	1
Kedah Darul Aman	Total		17	0	1	0	0	0	3	0	21	1
Career total			0	0	0	0	0	0	0	0	0	0
