= Fikhri Zulkiflee =

Malaysian footballer

Personal information
- Full name: Muhamad Fikhri bin Zulkiflee
- Date of birth: 22 January 1999 (age 27)
- Place of birth: Kulim, Malaysia
- Height: 1.82 m (6 ft 0 in)
- Position: Forward

Team information
- Current team: Kedah Darul Aman
- Number: 99

Youth career
- –2021: Kedah Darul Aman U21

Senior career*
Years	Team	Apps	(Gls)
2021–2022	Kedah Darul Aman	2	(1)
- * Club domestic league appearances and goals as of 1 November 2022

Muhamad Fikhri bin Zulkiflee (born 22 January 1999) is a Malaysian professional footballer who plays as a forward for Kedah Darul Aman.

== Club career ==
=== Kedah Darul Aman ===
On 8 September 2021, Fikhri made his Malaysia Super League debut for the club and scored his first goal.

== Career statistics ==
=== Club ===
As of 1 November 2022

Appearances and goals by club, season and competition
Club	Season	League			Cup		League Cup		Continental		Total	
Club	Season	Division	Apps	Goals	Apps	Goals	Apps	Goals	Apps	Goals	Apps	Goals
Kedah Darul Aman	2021	Malaysia Super League	2	1	0	0	2	0	–		4	1
Kedah Darul Aman	2022	Malaysia Super League	0	0	0	0	1	0	0	0	1	0
Kedah Darul Aman	Total		2	1	0	0	3	0	0	0	5	1
Career total			2	1	0	0	3	0	0	0	5	1
