= Al-Hafiz Harun =

Malaysian footballer

Personal information
- Full name: Muhammad Al-Hafiz bin Harun
- Date of birth: 13 September 1994 (age 32)
- Place of birth: Sik, Malaysia
- Height: 1.65 m (5 ft 5 in)
- Position: Winger

Youth career
- 2013: Penang U21

Senior career*
Years	Team	Apps	(Gls)
2019–2021	Penang	35	(6)
2022–2023	Kedah Darul Aman	28	(1)
2023	→Penang (loan)	7	(0)
2024–2025	Penang	13	(0)
2025–2026	Immigration		
- * Club domestic league appearances and goals

Muhammad Al-Hafiz bin Harun (born 13 September 1994) is a Malaysian professional footballer who plays as a winger.

== International career ==
On 23 September 2021, Al-Hafiz received his first call-up to the Malaysia national team, for central training and friendly matches against Jordan and Uzbekistan.

== Career statistics ==
=== Club ===
As of match played 15 October 2022

Appearances and goals by club, season and competition
Club	Season	League			Cup		League Cup		Continental		Total	
Club	Season	Division	Apps	Goals	Apps	Goals	Apps	Goals	Apps	Goals	Apps	Goals
Penang	2019	Malaysia Premier League	6	4	2	0	6	0	—		14	4
Penang	2020	Malaysia Premier League	11	1	0	0	1	0	—		12	1
Penang	2021	Malaysia Super League	18	1	0	0	5	1	—		23	2
Penang	Total		35	6	2	0	12	1	—		49	7
Kedah Darul Aman	2022	Malaysia Super League	18	0	2	0	0	0	4	0	24	0
Kedah Darul Aman	2023	Malaysia Super League	5	1	1	0	0	0	—		6	1
Kedah Darul Aman	Total		23	1	3	0	0	0	4	0	30	1
Career total			58	7	5	0	12	1	4	0	79	8

== Honours ==
=== Club ===
Penang

- Malaysia Premier League: 2020
