= Aiman Afif =

Malaysian footballer (born 2001)

Personal information
- Full name: Mohd Aiman Afif bin Md Afizul
- Date of birth: 18 February 2001 (age 25)
- Place of birth: Jitra, Malaysia
- Height: 1.78 m (5 ft 10 in)
- Position: Attacking midfielder

Team information
- Current team: Kedah FA
- Number: 19

Youth career
- –2020: Kedah Darul Aman

Senior career*
Years	Team	Apps	(Gls)
2021–2025	Kedah Darul Aman	19	(1)
2025–	Kedah FA		

International career
2019–2021	Malaysia U19	7	(0)
- * Club domestic league appearances and goals

Mohd Aiman Afif bin Md Afizul (born 18 February 2001) is a Malaysian professional footballer who plays as an attacking midfielder.

== Career statistics ==
=== Club ===
As of 15 April 2023

Appearances and goals by club, season and competition
Club	Season	League			Cup		League Cup		Continental		Total	
Club	Season	Division	Apps	Goals	Apps	Goals	Apps	Goals	Apps	Goals	Apps	Goals
Kedah Darul Aman	2021	Malaysia Super League	3	0	–		4	0	–		7	0
Kedah Darul Aman	2022	Malaysia Super League	3	1	1	0	1	0	2	0	7	1
Kedah Darul Aman	2023	Malaysia Super League	5	0	0	0	0	0	0	0	5	0
Kedah Darul Aman	Total		11	1	1	0	5	0	2	0	19	1

== Honours ==
Kedah Darul Aman

- Malaysia Super League runner-up: 2021, 2022

Malaysia U23

- ASEAN U-23 Championship 4th Place: 2023
