= Rodney Celvin =

Malaysian footballer

Personal information
- Full name: Rodney Celvin Akwensivie
- Date of birth: 25 November 1996 (age 29)
- Place of birth: Serian, Malaysia
- Height: 1.81 m (5 ft 11 1/2 in)
- Position: Centre-back

Team information
- Current team: Kuching City
- Number: 3

Youth career
- –2015: Tabuan Jaya Sport School
- 2013–2016: Sarawak U-21

Senior career*
Years	Team	Apps	(Gls)
2016–2017	Sarawak	12	(0)
2018–2019	PKNS	34	(1)
2020	Selangor	8	(0)
2021	→ Kedah Darul Aman (loan)	14	(0)
2022–2023	Kedah Darul Aman	31	(1)
2024–	Kuching City	7	(0)

International career^{‡}
2018	Malaysia U23	1	(0)
2026–	Malaysia	7	(0)
- * Club domestic league appearances and goals as of 29 September 2024 ‡ National team caps and goals as of 17 November 2026

Rodney Celvin Akwensivie (/ˈrɒdnɪ/; born 25 November 1996) is a Malaysian professional footballer who plays as a centre-back for Malaysia Super League club Kuching City and the Malaysia national team.

== International career ==
Being born in Malaysia to a Ghanaian-Malaysian father and a Malaysian mother, Akwensivie was eligible to represent either Malaysia or Ghana. He would eventually represent Malaysia.

=== Malaysia U23 ===
In March 2016, Akwensivie received his first call-up to the Malaysia U23s for the centralised training camp as a preparation for friendly match against Philippines U23s and Nepal U23s. Rodney was named in the 20-man Malaysia Squad for the 2018 Asian Games. On 20 August 2018, he made his international debut for Malaysia U23s against Bahrain. In that match, he came on as a substitute, and Malaysia lost 2–3.

=== Senior ===
In July 2026, Akwensivie was selected to be part of the senior team for the 2026 ASEAN Championship. He made his international debut on 25 July in the match against Myanmar at the Thuwunna Stadium.

== Personal life ==
Akwensivie was born in Serian, Sarawak to a Bidayuh mother and a Ghanaian-Malaysian father. He also has a brother, Abbel who also plays for Sarawak.

== Club statistics ==
As of 2 June 2023.

Appearances and goals by club, season and competition
Club	Season	League			Cup		League Cup		Continental		Total	
Club	Season	Division	Apps	Goals	Apps	Goals	Apps	Goals	Apps	Goals	Apps	Goals
Sarawak	2016	Malaysia Super League	6	0	0	0	2	0	–		8	0
Sarawak	2017	Malaysia Super League	6	0	0	0	4	0	–		10	0
Sarawak	Total		12	0	0	0	6	0	0	0	18	0
PKNS	2018	Malaysia Super League	16	0	6	1	5	0	–		27	1
PKNS	2019	Malaysia Super League	18	1	4	0	5	0	–		27	1
PKNS	Total		34	1	10	1	10	0	0	0	54	2
Selangor	2020	Malaysia Super League	8	0	0	0	0	0	–		8	0
Selangor	Total		8	0	0	0	0	0	0	0	8	0
Kedah Darul Aman (loan)	2021	Malaysia Super League	14	0	–		4	0	–		18	0
Kedah Darul Aman	2022	Malaysia Super League	18	1	1	0	0	0	4 (Note: Appearances in AFC Cup)	0	23	1
Kedah Darul Aman	2023	Malaysia Super League	13	0	0	0	0	0	–		13	0
Kedah Darul Aman	Total		45	1	1	0	4	0	4	0	54	1
Career total			99	1	11	1	20	0	4	0	134	3
