= Ronald Ngah =

Cameroonian footballer

Ronald Ngah Wanja
Personal information
- Full name: Wanja Ronald Ngah
- Date of birth: 12 September 1991 (age 35)
- Place of birth: Tiko, Cameroon
- Height: 1.87 m (6 ft 2 in)
- Position: Striker

Team information
- Current team: Kuching City
- Number: 18

Youth career
- Njala Quan

Senior career*
Years	Team	Apps	(Gls)
2013–2016	Njala Quan		
2016–2018	Coton Sport		
2018	Al-Jahra		(13)
2018–2019	Al-Qadsia		(2)
2019–2020	Smouha	13	(3)
2020	Al-Mujazzal	15	(3)
2021	Al-Salt	22	(15)
2022	Kedah Darul Aman	21	(13)
2023	Al-Khor	8	(5)
2023–2024	Hajer	16	(1)
2024	Al-Faisaly		
2024–2025	Al-Talaba	17	(1)
2025–	Kuching City	23	(13)

International career
2015–	Cameroon	2	(1)
- * Club domestic league appearances and goals as of 30 June 2026

Wanja Ronald Ngah (born 12 September 1991), also known as Ronald Ngah Wanja, is a Cameroonian professional footballer who plays for Kuching City as a striker.

== Club career ==
=== Kedah Darul Aman ===
On 21 January 2022, Ronald signed for Malaysia Super League club Kedah Darul Aman. He scored on his Malaysia Super League debut against Sarawak United in a 1–0 away win on 4 March.

On 31 July 2023, Ronald joined Hajer. On 31 January 2024, Ngah joined Jordanian side Al-Faisaly.

=== Kuching City F.C ===
On 20 July 2025, Ronald signed for Malaysia Super League club Kuching City

== Career statistics ==
As of 1 November 2022

=== Club ===
Club	Season	League			Cup		League Cup		Continental		Total	
Club	Season	Division	Apps	Goals	Apps	Goals	Apps	Goals	Apps	Goals	Apps	Goals
Kedah Darul Aman	2022	Malaysia Super League	21	13	1	0	2	0	4	2	28	15
Kedah Darul Aman	Total		21	13	1	0	2	0	4	2	28	15
Career total			0	0	0	0	0	0	0	0	0	0

== Honours ==
=== Individual ===
- Jordan Premier League top scorer: 2021 (15 goals), 2023–24 (13 goals)
