= Zharmein Ashraf =

Malaysian footballer

Personal information
- Full name: Mohammad Zharmein Ashraf bin Ismail
- Date of birth: 30 March 2002 (age 24)
- Place of birth: Sarawak, Malaysia
- Position: Winger

Team information
- Current team: Kedah Darul Aman
- Number: 79

Youth career
- 2018: Petra Giant
- 2019–2020: Kedah Darul Aman U21
- 2020–2021: Sarawak United II

Senior career*
Years	Team	Apps	(Gls)
2022	Sarawak United	12	(0)
2023	Kedah Darul Aman	0	(0)
2024–	Kuching City	0	(0)

International career^{‡}
2022	Malaysia U-23		
- * Club domestic league appearances and goals as of 11 October 2022 ‡ National team caps and goals as of 11 October 2022

Mohammad Zharmein Ashraf bin Ismail (born 30 March 2002) is a Malaysian professional footballer who plays as a winger for Malaysia Super League club Kuching City.

== Early life ==
Zharmein was born in Kampung Iboi Ulu, Sadong Jaya.

== Club career ==
=== Sarawak United ===
Zharmein started his career with Sarawak United. He made 13 appearances for Sarawak United.

=== Kedah Darul Aman ===
On 21 December 2022, Zharmein signed a one-year contract with Malaysia Super League club Kedah Darul Aman.

== International career ==
He has played for Malaysia youth national teams.

== Style of play ==
Zharmein is left-footed and can operate as a winger os striker.

== Career statistics ==
=== Club ===
As of 11 October 2022

Appearances and goals by club, season and competition
Club	Season	League			Cup		League Cup		Continental		Total	
Club	Season	Division	Apps	Goals	Apps	Goals	Apps	Goals	Apps	Goals	Apps	Goals
Sarawak United	2022	Malaysia Super League	12	0	0	0	1	0	–		13	0
Sarawak United	Total		12	0	0	0	1	0	–		13	0
Kedah Darul Aman	2023	Malaysia Super League	0	0	0	0	0	0	–		0	0
Kedah Darul Aman	Total		0	0	0	0	0	0	–		0	0
Career total			0	0	0	0	0	0	0	0	0	0
