= Bojan Ciger =

Serbian footballer (born 1994)

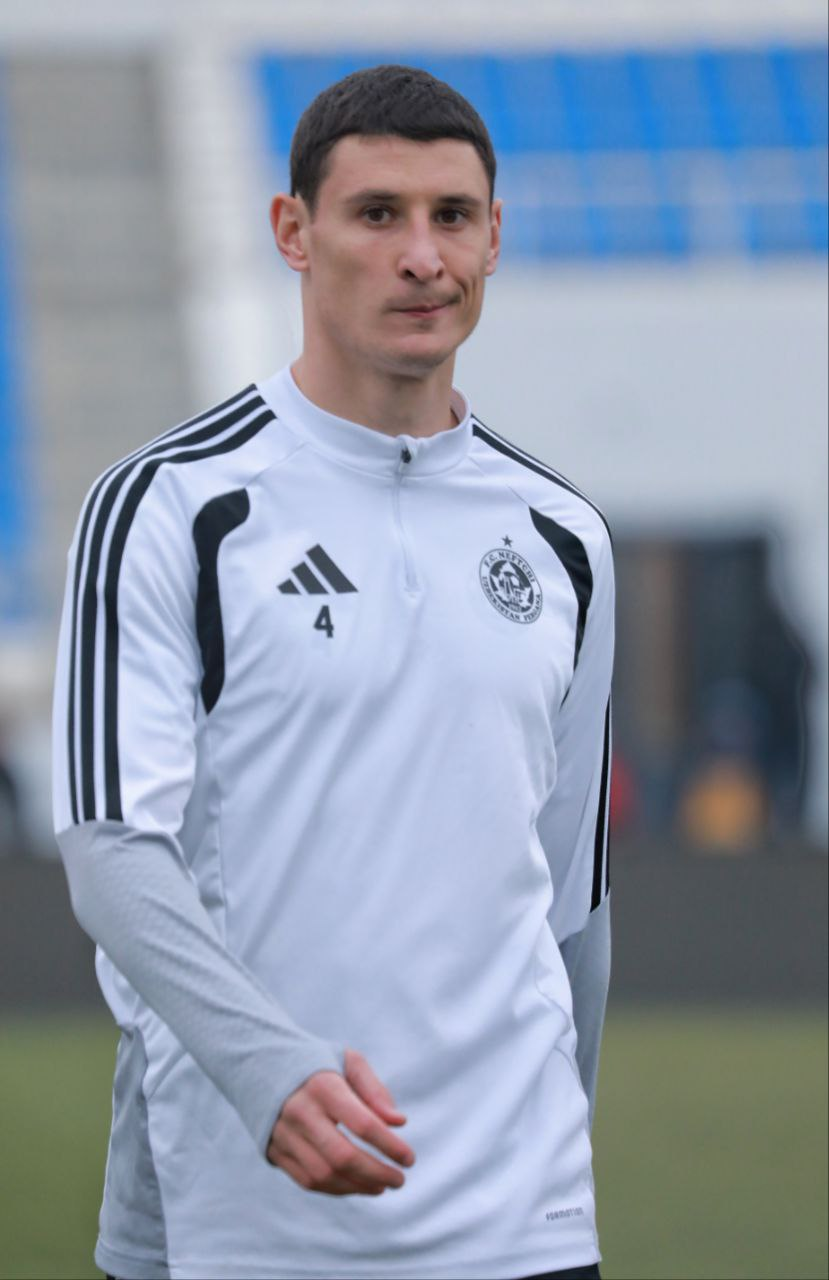

Personal information
- Date of birth: 18 June 1994 (age 32)
- Place of birth: Majdanpek, Serbia
- Height: 1.86 m (6 ft 1 in)
- Position: Centre-back

Team information
- Current team: FC Neftchi Fergana
- Number: 4

Senior career*
Years	Team	Apps	(Gls)
2013–2014	FK Jagodina		
2013–2014	GFK Tabane		
2014–2015	Djerdap Kladovo		
2015–2017	BASK Belgrad		
2018–2019	Inđija	23	(0)
2019–2020	Sutjeska Niksic	37	(1)
2020–2021	Rad	30	(0)
2021–2022	Navbahor Namangan	44	(2)
2023	Kedah Darul Aman	28	(1)
2024–	Neftchi Fergana	57	(4)
- * Club domestic league appearances and goals as of 20:10, 28 July 2026 (UTC)

Bojan Ciger (born 18 June 1994) is a Serbian professional footballer who plays as a centre-back for Uzbekistan Super League club Neftchi Fergana.

== Career ==
In 2019, Ciger signed for Rad. In 2020, he signed for Navbahor Namangan. After that, he signed for Kedah Darul Aman.
