= Jonathan Balotelli =

Brazilian association football player

Personal information
- Full name: Jonathan Boareto dos Reis
- Date of birth: 20 April 1989 (age 37)
- Place of birth: Rio de Janeiro, Brazil
- Height: 1.85 m (6 ft 1 in)
- Position: Forward

Team information
- Current team: FK Makedonija G.P.
- Number: 89

Senior career*
Years	Team	Apps	(Gls)
2011	Vitória das Tabocas		
2011–2013	Friburguense		
2013	Pesqueira	0	(0)
2013–2014	Sport Recife	3	(0)
2014	Audax Rio	0	(0)
2014	→ Macaé (loan)	15	(2)
2015	Caldas Novas	0	(0)
2016	URT	0	(0)
2016	→ Cuiabá (loan)	1	(0)
2016–2017	Vardar	29	(11)
2017–2018	Al-Gharafa	0	(0)
2018	Busan IPark	4	(0)
2018–2019	Sanat Naft Abadan	11	(0)
2019	Sichuan Longfor	9	(0)
2020–2021	Enosis Neon Paralimni	9	(0)
2021–2022	Jeonnam Dragons	38	(0)
2023	Kedah Darul Aman	14	(4)
2024–	FK Makedonija G.P.	3	(1)
- * Club domestic league appearances and goals as of 14 March 2024

Jonathan Boareto dos Reis (born 20 April 1989), known as just Jonathan Balotelli, is a Brazilian footballer who plays as a centre forward for Macedonian First League club FK Makedonija G.P.
