= Afeeq Iqmal =

Malaysian footballer

Personal information
- Full name: Mohammad Afeeq Iqmal bin Rosli
- Date of birth: 9 April 1999 (age 27)
- Place of birth: Baling, Malaysia
- Position: Forward

Team information
- Current team: Kedah FA

Youth career
- 2017: Kuala Muda Naza
- –2021: Kedah Darul Aman U21

Senior career*
Years	Team	Apps	(Gls)
2021–2022	Kedah Darul Aman	5	(0)
2023–2024	Manjung City	16	(10)
2024–2025	Kedah Darul Aman	11	(1)
2025	Melaka	10	(0)
2026–26	→ Kedah FA (loan)		
2026–	Kedah FA		
- * Club domestic league appearances and goals as of 15 July 2025

Mohammad Afeeq Iqmal bin Rosli (born 1999) is a Malaysian professional footballer who plays as a forward for Malaysia A1 Semi-Pro League club Kedah FA.

== Career statistics ==
=== Club ===
As of 1 October 2022

Appearances and goals by club, season and competition
Club	Season	League			Cup		League Cup		Continental		Total	
Club	Season	Division	Apps	Goals	Apps	Goals	Apps	Goals	Apps	Goals	Apps	Goals
Kedah Darul Aman	2021	Malaysia Super League	1	0	–		0	0	–		1	0
Kedah Darul Aman	2022	Malaysia Super League	4	0	1	0	0	0	1	0	6	0
Kedah Darul Aman	Total		5	0	1	0	0	0	1	0	7	0
Career total			5	0	1	0	0	0	1	0	7	0
