= Darul Aman Stadium =

Stadium in Kota Setar, Kedah, Malaysia

Coordinates: 6°08′10″N 100°22′18″E

Stadium Darul Aman
- SDA
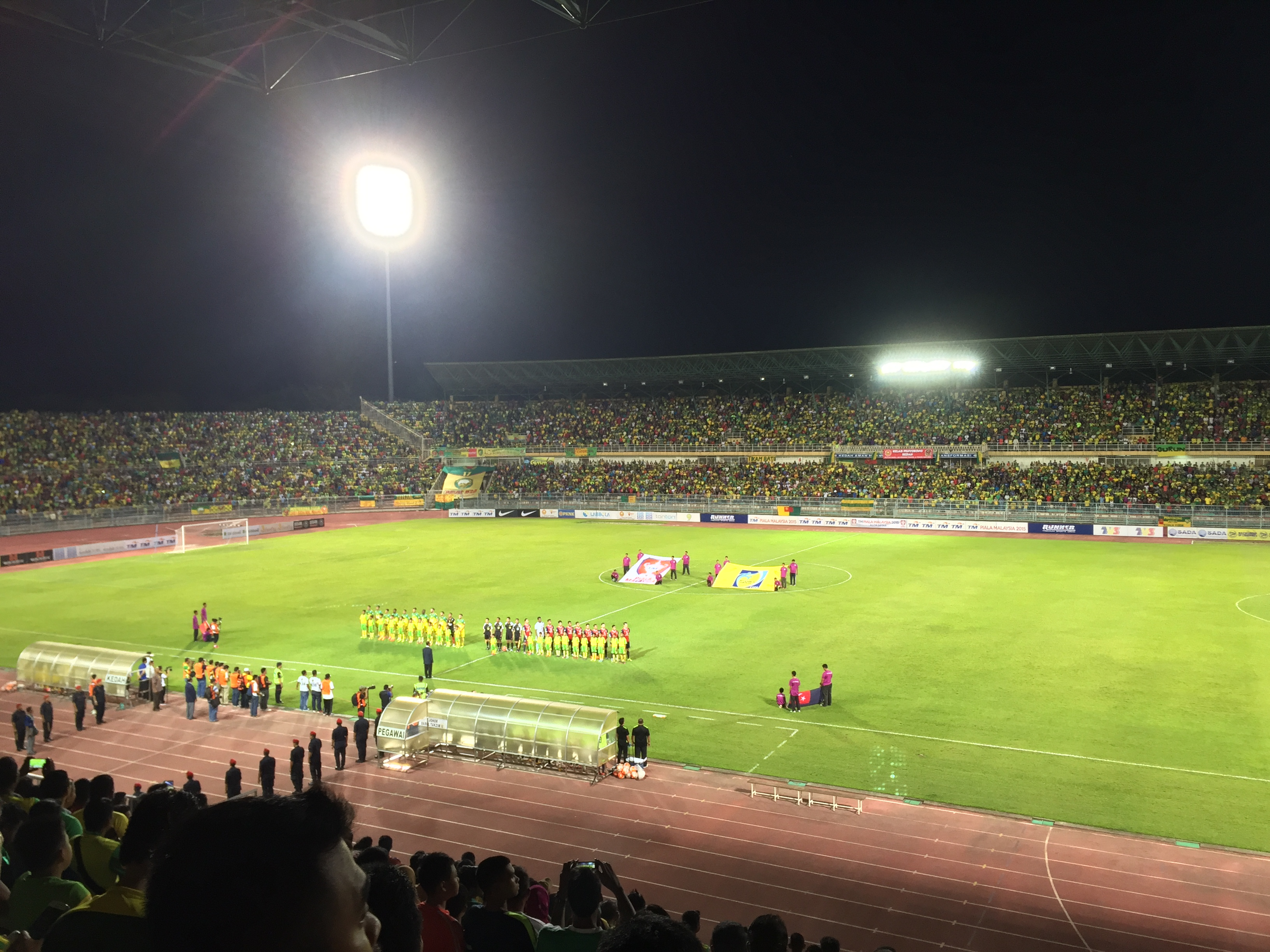
- The stadium during Kedah Darul Aman vs. Johor Darul Ta'zim II
- Interactive map of Stadium Darul Aman
- Location: Jalan Stadium, 05100 Alor Star, Kedah Darul Aman, Malaysia
- Owner: State Government of Kedah
- Operator: Kedah State Stadium Corporation
- Capacity: 32,387
- Surface: Bermuda grass
- Field size: 120m x 70m

Construction
- Opened: 1962
- Renovated: 2006, 2020
- Expanded: 1997
- General contractor: Seri Temin Development Company (STDC) Sdn. Bhd.

Tenants
- Kedah Darul Aman (1962–); Kuala Muda NAZA (2004–2009); Kedah FA state football team (2025–)

The Darul Aman Stadium (Malay: Stadium Darul Aman) is a multi-purpose all-seater stadium in Alor Setar, Kedah, Malaysia. It is currently used mostly for football matches. The stadium was opened officially by the Sultan of Kedah in 1962 during Malaya's 1-0 victory against South Korea. It has a capacity of 32,387 seats. It was one of the venues for the 1997 FIFA World Youth Championship.
