= 2026–27 Star City F.C. season =

Star City
2026–27 season
- Owner: IFC Corporation Sdn. Bhd.
- President: Muhammad Syahmi Jaafar
- Head coach: Mehmet Duraković
- Stadium: Tuanku Syed Putra Stadium
- Malaysia Super League: TBD
- Malaysia FA Cup: TBD
- Malaysia Cup: TBD
| Home colours | Away colours |

The 2026–27 season was the 13th season in the history of Star City, and the club's 2nd season in the Malaysia Super League. In addition to the domestic league, the club participated in the Malaysia FA Cup and the Malaysia Cup. Immigration FC rebrand the name to Star City for this season.

== Coaching staff ==
| Position | Name | Ref. |
|---|---|---|
| Head coach | (Australia) Mehmet Duraković | |
| Assistant coach | (Malaysia) Rusdi Suparman | |
| Goalkeeping coach | (Malaysia) Abdul Hadi Abdul Hamid | |
| Technical director | (Malaysia) Shahrul Azhar | |
| Fitness coach | (Malaysia) Mohamad Naim Mohamad Sukri | |
| Assistant fitness coach | (Malaysia) Muhammad Firdaus Hassian | |
| Team doctor | (Malaysia) Jasminder Singh | |
| Team doctor | (Malaysia) Syahrizal Nadzir | |
| Second team head coach | (Malaysia) Azlan Ahmad | |
| Second team assistant head coach | (Malaysia) Norhudahiroshi Razak | |
| Second team assistant coach | (Malaysia) Raziff Shahrizal | |
| Second team assistant coach | (Malaysia) Syawal Othman | |
| Second team goalkeeping coach | (Malaysia) Azmin Azram | |
| Second team technical director | (Malaysia) Zainal Abidin Hassan | |

== Players ==
=== First-team squad ===
As of 24 August 2026

Note: Flags indicate national team as defined under FIFA eligibility rules; some limited exceptions apply. Players may hold more than one non-FIFA nationality.

| No. | Pos. | Nation | Player |
|---|---|---|---|
| 2 | DF | PHI | Noah Leddel |
| 3 | DF | MAS | Akmal Zahir |
| 4 | DF | MAS | Harith Samsuri |
| 5 | MF | BRA | Pedro Santos Filho |
| 6 | MF | MAS | Azfar Fikri |
| 8 | FW | MAS | T. Saravanan |
| 10 | FW | BRA | Pedro Henrique |
| 12 | DF | MAS | Aiman Yusni |
| 13 | DF | MAS | Loqman Hakim |
| 14 | MF | MAS | Endrick |
| 15 | DF | MAS | Rizal Ghazali (captain) |
| 16 | FW | BRA | Ramon Machado |
| 17 | DF | BRA | Rafael Vitor |
| 18 | MF | MAS | Syafik Ismail |

| No. | Pos. | Nation | Player |
|---|---|---|---|
| 19 | MF | MAS | Mior Dani |
| 20 | GK | MAS | Shaiful Wazizi Mohammad |
| 22 | MF | MAS | Engku Nur Shakir |
| 23 | GK | MAS | Hafizul Hakim |
| 25 | DF | MAS | Anwar Ibrahim |
| 26 | FW | MAS | Syahmi Zamri |
| 27 | MF | MAS | Fakhri Azri |
| 29 | MF | SGP | Zulfahmi Arifin |
| 30 | DF | MAS | Heshamudin Ahmad |
| 33 | MF | MAS | Nik Akif |
| 34 | MF | MAS | Amirul Aiman |
| 43 | GK | MAS | Farhan Abdul Majid |
| 97 | FW | BRA | Douglas Oliveira |

== Transfers ==
=== In ===
Pre-season

| Date | Pos. | Player | Transferred from | Ref |
|---|---|---|---|---|
| August 2026 | DF | (Malaysia) Akmal Zahir | (Malaysia) Penang | Free |
| August 2026 | DF | (Malaysia) Anwar Ibrahim | (Malaysia) Negeri Sembilan | Free |
| August 2026 | DF | (Malaysia) Harith Samsuri | (Malaysia) Negeri Sembilan | Free |
| August 2026 | MF | (Malaysia) Syafik Ismail | (Malaysia) Kelantan The Real Warriors | Free |
| August 2026 | MF | (Malaysia) T. Saravanan | (Malaysia) Kelantan The Real Warriors | Free |
| August 2026 | MF | (Malaysia) Amirul Aiman | (Malaysia) Kuala Lumpur City | |
| August 2026 | FW | (Malaysia) Fakhri Azri Khairi Anuar | (Malaysia) Kuala Lumpur City | |
| August 2026 | GK | (Malaysia) Hafizul Hakim | (Malaysia) Kuala Lumpur City | |
| August 2026 | FW | (Malaysia) Engku Nur Shakir | (Malaysia) Terengganu | Free |
| August 2026 | FW | (Malaysia) Syahmi Zamri | (Malaysia) Terengganu | Free |
| August 2026 | MF | (Malaysia) Endrick | (Vietnam) Cong An Ho Chi Minh City FC | Free |
| August 2026 | FW | (Brazil) Pedro Henrique | (Brazil) Cuiabá Esporte Clube | Free |
| August 2026 | DF | (Philippines) Noah Leddel | (Thailand) Ayutthaya United | |
| August 2026 | FW | (Brazil) Ramon Machado | (Azerbaijan) Araz-Naxçıvan PFK | Free |

=== Out ===
Pre-season

| Date | Pos. | Player | Transferred To | Ref |
|---|---|---|---|---|
| 31 May 2026 | MF | (Malaysia) Al-Hafiz Harun | (Malaysia) | Free |
| 31 May 2026 | MF | (Malaysia) Farid Nezal | (Malaysia) | Free |

== Pre-season and friendlies ==
Win Draw Loss Fixtures

| 4 August 2026 Friendly | Songkhla All Star (Thailand) | v | (Malaysia) Star City | Songkhla, Thailand |
| 17:00 UTC+8 | | | | Stadium: Songkhla FC Sports Complex |

| 8 August 2026 Friendly | PT Satun F.C. (Thailand) | 1–0 | (Malaysia) Star City | Songkhla, Thailand |
| 17:00 UTC+8 | | | | Stadium: Prince Songkhla University Stadium |

== Competitions ==
=== Overview ===
| Competition | First match | Last match | Starting round | Final position | Record | | | | | | | |
| Competition | First match | Last match | Starting round | Final position | Pld | W | D | L | GF | GA | GD | Win % |
|---|---|---|---|---|---|---|---|---|---|---|---|---|
| Super League | 22 August 2026 | May 2027 | Matchday 1 | TBD | 0 | 0 | 0 | 0 | 0 | 0 | +0 | — |
| FA Cup | 1–2 September 2026 | January 2027 | TBD | TBD | 0 | 0 | 0 | 0 | 0 | 0 | +0 | — |
| Malaysia Cup | 22–24 January 2027 | May 2027 | TBD | TBD | 0 | 0 | 0 | 0 | 0 | 0 | +0 | — |
| Total | | | | | 0 | 0 | 0 | 0 | 0 | 0 | +0 | — |

Source: Competitions

=== Malaysia Super League ===
Win Draw Loss

| 22 August 2026 1 | v |
| 00:00 MYT (UTC+8) |

| Pos | Team | Pld | W | D | L | GF | GA | GD | Pts |
|---|---|---|---|---|---|---|---|---|---|
| 7 | Penang | 0 | 0 | 0 | 0 | 0 | 0 | 0 | 0 |
| 8 | Sabah | 0 | 0 | 0 | 0 | 0 | 0 | 0 | 0 |
| 9 | Star City | 0 | 0 | 0 | 0 | 0 | 0 | 0 | 0 |
| 10 | Kelantan Red Warrior | 1 | 0 | 0 | 1 | 1 | 4 | −3 | 0 |
| 11 | Kuching City | 1 | 0 | 0 | 1 | 0 | 3 | −3 | 0 |

Updated to match(es) played on 22 August 2026. Source: Malaysian Football League
Rules for classification: 1) Points; 2) Goal difference; 3) Number of goals scored.

== Squad and statistics ==
As of August 2026

| No. | Pos | Player | Malaysia Super League | | Malaysia FA Cup | | Malaysia Cup | | Total | |
| No. | Pos | Player | Apps | Goals | Apps | Goals | Apps | Goals | Apps | Goals |
|---|---|---|---|---|---|---|---|---|---|---|
| 1 | GK | (Malaysia) Zarif Irfan | 0 | 0 | 0 | 0 | 0 | 0 | 0 | 0 |
| 3 | DF | (Brazil) Vinicius Milani | 0 | 0 | 0 | 0 | 0 | 0 | 0 | 0 |
| 4 | DF | (Iran) Amirali Chegini | 0 | 0 | 0 | 0 | 0 | 0 | 0 | 0 |
| 5 | DF | (Brazil) Pedro Santos | 0 | 0 | 0 | 0 | 0 | 0 | 0 | 0 |
| 6 | MF | (Malaysia) Azfar Fikri | 0 | 0 | 0 | 0 | 0 | 0 | 0 | 0 |
| 7 | FW | (Burundi) Elvis Kamsoba | 0 | 0 | 0 | 0 | 0 | 0 | 0 | 0 |
| 8 | MF | (Malaysia) Nik Sharif Haseefy | 0 | 0 | 0 | 0 | 0 | 0 | 0 | 0 |
| 9 | FW | (Brazil) João Pedro | 0 | 0 | 0 | 0 | 0 | 0 | 0 | 0 |
| 10 | FW | (Brazil) Eduardo Sosa | 0 | 0 | 0 | 0 | 0 | 0 | 0 | 0 |
| 12 | DF | (Malaysia) Aiman Yusni | 0 | 0 | 0 | 0 | 0 | 0 | 0 | 0 |
| 13 | DF | (Malaysia) Loqman Hakim | 0 | 0 | 0 | 0 | 0 | 0 | 0 | 0 |
| 15 | DF | (Malaysia) Rizal Ghazali | 0 | 0 | 0 | 0 | 0 | 0 | 0 | 0 |
| 17 | MF | (Myanmar) Thiha Zaw | 0 | 0 | 0 | 0 | 0 | 0 | 0 | 0 |
| 18 | MF | (Malaysia) Abdul Halim Saari | 0 | 0 | 0 | 0 | 0 | 0 | 0 | 0 |
| 19 | MF | (Malaysia) Mior Dani | 0 | 0 | 0 | 0 | 0 | 0 | 0 | 0 |
| 20 | MF | (Malaysia) Fadzrul Danel | 0 | 0 | 0 | 0 | 0 | 0 | 0 | 0 |
| 21 | MF | (Malaysia) Fayadh Zulkifli | 0 | 0 | 0 | 0 | 0 | 0 | 0 | 0 |
| 25 | FW | (Brazil) Rafael Holstein | 0 | 0 | 0 | 0 | 0 | 0 | 0 | 0 |
| 33 | MF | (Malaysia) Nik Akif | 0 | 0 | 0 | 0 | 0 | 0 | 0 | 0 |
| 43 | GK | (Malaysia) Farhan Abdul Majid | 0 | 0 | 0 | 0 | 0 | 0 | 0 | 0 |
| 47 | DF | (Malaysia) Farid Nezal | 0 | 0 | 0 | 0 | 0 | 0 | 0 | 0 |
| 77 | DF | (Thailand) Keron Ornchaiyaphum | 0 | 0 | 0 | 0 | 0 | 0 | 0 | 0 |
| 90 | FW | (Colombia) Wilmar Jordán | 0 | 0 | 0 | 0 | 0 | 0 | 0 | 0 |
Players transferred or loaned out during the season
