= 2025–26 Immigration F.C. season =

Immigration
2025–26 season
- Owner: Immigration Department of Malaysia
- President: Muhammad Syahmi Jaafar
- Head coach: Yusri Che Lah
- Stadium: Tuanku Syed Putra Stadium
- Malaysia Super League: 6th
- Malaysia FA Cup: Round of 16
- Malaysia Cup: Round of 16
- MFL Challenge Cup: Quarter-finals
- Top goalscorer: League: Eduardo Sosa (2); All: Eduardo Sosa (2)
Home colours	Away colours

The 2025–26 season was the 12th season in the history of Immigration, and the club's 1st season in the Malaysia Super League. In addition to the domestic league, the club participated in the Malaysia FA Cup and the Malaysia Cup.

== Coaching staff ==
Position	Name	Ref.
Head coach	(Malaysia) Yusri Che Lah	
Assistant coach	(Malaysia) Rusdi Suparman	
Goalkeeping coach	(Malaysia) Abdul Hadi Abdul Hamid	
Technical director	(Malaysia) Shahrul Azhar	
Fitness coach	(Malaysia) Mohamad Naim Mohamad Sukri	
Assistant fitness coach	(Malaysia) Muhammad Firdaus Hassian	
Team doctor	(Malaysia) Jasminder Singh	
Team doctor	(Malaysia) Syahrizal Nadzir	
Second team head coach	(Malaysia) Azlan Ahmad	
Second team assistant head coach	(Malaysia) Norhudahiroshi Razak	
Second team assistant coach	(Malaysia) Raziff Shahrizal	
Second team assistant coach	(Malaysia) Syawal Othman	
Second team goalkeeping coach	(Malaysia) Azmin Azram	
Second team technical director	(Malaysia) Zainal Abidin Hassan	

== Players ==
=== First-team squad ===
As of 6 August 2025

Note: Flags indicate national team as defined under FIFA eligibility rules; some limited exceptions apply. Players may hold more than one non-FIFA nationality.

No.	Pos.	Nation	Player
1	GK	MAS	Zarif Irfan
3	DF	BRA	Vinicius Milani
4	DF	IRN	Amirali Chegini
5	MF	BRA	Pedro Santos
6	MF	MAS	Azfar Fikri
7	FW	BDI	Elvis Kamsoba
8	MF	MAS	Nik Sharif Haseefy
9	FW	BRA	João Pedro
10	MF	VEN	Eduardo Sosa
11	MF	MAS	Al-Hafiz Harun
12	DF	MAS	Aiman Yusni
13	DF	MAS	Loqman Hakim
15	DF	MAS	Rizal Ghazali (captain)
17	FW	MYA	Thiha Zaw
18	MF	MAS	Abdul Halim Saari

No.	Pos.	Nation	Player
19	MF	MAS	Mior Dani
20	MF	MAS	Fadzrul Danel
21	MF	MAS	Fayadh Zulkifli
22	DF	MAS	Hanafie Tokyo
25	FW	BRA	Rafael Holstein
27	MF	MAS	Syahmi Shamsudin
30	DF	MAS	Heshamudin Ahmad
33	MF	MAS	Nik Akif
35	GK	MAS	Shaiful Wazizi
37	DF	MAS	Azmeer Aris
43	GK	MAS	Farhan Abdul Majid
47	DF	MAS	Farid Nezal
77	DF	THA	Keron Ornchaiyaphum
90	FW	COL	Wilmar Jordán

=== Immigration II ===
As of 1 August 2025

Note: Flags indicate national team as defined under FIFA eligibility rules; some limited exceptions apply. Players may hold more than one non-FIFA nationality.

No.	Pos.	Nation	Player
1	GK	MAS	Izarul Adli
2	DF	MAS	Akif Afizi
3	DF	MAS	Rafie Kamaruzzaman
4	DF	BRA	Felipe De Lima
5	DF	MAS	Afiq Azuan
6	DF	MAS	Nasriq Baharom
9	DF	MAS	Khairul Naim
10	FW	MAS	Afiq Hilman
11	MF	MAS	Adam Mukriz
12	MF	MAS	Sahrizan Saidin
13	GK	MAS	Farhan Abu Bakar
16	MF	MAS	Furqan Azri
17	MF	MAS	Hazim Abu Zaid
19	MF	MAS	Wafi Badrul Zaman
21	MF	MAS	Hafiz Kamal (captain)

No.	Pos.	Nation	Player
22	GK	MAS	Hazeem Iman
23	DF	MAS	Haziq Ridhwan
24	FW	MAS	Hilmi Abdul Ghafar
27	MF	MAS	Syahir Ishak
28	MF	MAS	Bukhari Idris
29	MF	MAS	Hazrin Jamil
33	DF	MAS	Juzaerul Jasmi
42	MF	MAS	Asyraf Zaquan
43	DF	MAS	Naaim Firdaus
70	MF	MAS	Shafi Azswad
73	MF	MAS	Nadzwin Salleh
77	FW	TAN	Said Khamis
81	DF	MAS	Arif Ilham
94	MF	MAS	Norzaiful Zaizurin
99	MF	MAS	Krienraaj Maran

== Competitions ==
=== Overview ===
Competition	First match	Last match	Starting round	Final position	Record							
Competition	First match	Last match	Starting round	Final position	Pld	W	D	L	GF	GA	GD	Win %
Malaysia Super League	9 August 2025	16 May 2026	Matchday 1	6th	24	9	5	10	38	43	−5	37.50
Malaysia FA Cup	17 August 2025	13 September 2025	Round of 16	Round of 16	2	1	0	1	2	4	−2	50.00
Malaysia Cup	17 January 2026	25 January 2026	Round of 16	Round of 16	2	0	1	1	0	1	−1	0.00
MFL Challenge Cup	7 February 2026	16 February 2026	Quarter-finals	Quarter-finals	2	0	0	2	2	4	−2	0.00
Total					30	10	6	14	42	52	−10	33.33

Source: Competitions

=== Malaysia Super League ===
9 August 2025 1	Immigration	0–3	Kuala Lumpur City	George Town
21:00 MYT (UTC+8)		Report	Rizal 30' (o.g.); Safawi 56'; Hidalgo 83' (pen.)	Stadium: City Stadium; Attendance: 444; Referee: Muhammad Shukor Zulkiflee

12 August 2025 2	Kelantan TRW	1–1	Immigration	Kota Bharu
21:00 MYT (UTC+8)	Olusegun 79' (pen.)	Report	Sosa 45+1'	Stadium: Sultan Muhammad IV Stadium; Attendance: 1,015; Referee: Muhammad Usaid Jamal

28 August 2025 3	Immigration	0–3	Johor Darul Ta'zim	Batu Kawan
17:00 MYT (UTC+8)		Report		Stadium: Penang State Stadium; Attendance: 673; Referee: Muhammad Munir Mohd Izam

20 September 2025 4	Immigration	1–1	Negeri Sembilan	Batu Kawan
17:00 MYT (UTC+8)	Jordán 26'	Report	Motika 45+1'	Stadium: Penang State Stadium; Attendance: 373; Referee: Razlan Joffri Ali

28 September 2025 5	Kuching City	4–0	Immigration	Kuching
20:15 MYT (UTC+8)		Report		Stadium: Sarawak State Stadium; Attendance: 4,470; Referee: S. Logeswaran

5 October 2025 6	Immigration	1–3	Selangor	George Town
17:00 MYT (UTC+8)	Sosa 66'	Report		Stadium: City Stadium; Attendance: 784; Referee: Muhammad Shukor Zulkiflee

Pos	Team	Pld	W	D	L	GF	GA	GD	Pts
4	Kuala Lumpur City	24	12	7	5	40	29	+11	43
5	Terengganu	24	10	6	8	39	34	+5	36
6	Immigration	24	9	5	10	38	43	−5	32
7	Negeri Sembilan	24	6	11	7	39	35	+4	29
8	Penang	24	6	7	11	26	41	−15	25

Updated to match(es) played on 17 May 2026. Source: Malaysian Football League
Rules for classification: 1) Points; 2) Goal difference; 3) Number of goals scored.

=== Malaysia FA Cup ===
Round of 16

17 August 2025 First leg	Immigration	2–1	Terengganu	Batu Kawan
21:00 UTC+8	Rafael 54'; João Pedro 90+1'	Report	Mabella 50'	Stadium: Penang State Stadium; Attendance: 410; Referee: Muhammad Khairulsyahmi Ahmad Khalidi

13 September 2025 Second leg	Terengganu	3–0 (4–2 agg.)	Immigration	Kuala Terengganu
21:00 UTC+8		Report		Stadium: Sultan Mizan Zainal Abidin Stadium; Attendance: 4,870; Referee: Muhammad Izzul Fikri Kamaruzaman

== Squad and statistics ==
As of 5 October 2025

No.	Pos	Player	Malaysia Super League		Malaysia FA Cup		Malaysia Cup		Total	
No.	Pos	Player	Apps	Goals	Apps	Goals	Apps	Goals	Apps	Goals
1	GK	(Malaysia) Zarif Irfan	3	0	2	0	0	0	5	0
3	DF	(Brazil) Vinicius Milani	4	0	1	0	0	0	5	0
4	DF	(Iran) Amirali Chegini	3+1	0	2	0	0	0	6	0
5	DF	(Brazil) Pedro Santos	4	0	1	0	0	0	5	0
6	MF	(Malaysia) Azfar Fikri	4+2	0	2	0	0	0	8	0
7	FW	(Burundi) Elvis Kamsoba	4	0	0+2	0	0	0	6	0
8	MF	(Malaysia) Nik Sharif Haseefy	0+2	0	0	0	0	0	2	0
9	FW	(Brazil) João Pedro	4+1	0	2	1	0	0	7	1
10	FW	(Brazil) Eduardo Sosa	3+1	2	1+1	0	0	0	6	2
12	DF	(Malaysia) Aiman Yusni	4+2	0	1+1	0	0	0	8	0
13	DF	(Malaysia) Loqman Hakim	0+1	0	0	0	0	0	1	0
15	DF	(Malaysia) Rizal Ghazali	5	0	2	0	0	0	7	0
17	MF	(Myanmar) Thiha Zaw	0+2	0	1	0	0	0	3	0
18	MF	(Malaysia) Abdul Halim Saari	3+2	0	0+1	0	0	0	6	0
19	MF	(Malaysia) Mior Dani	1+3	0	1	0	0	0	5	0
20	MF	(Malaysia) Fadzrul Danel	3+3	0	1+1	0	0	0	8	0
21	MF	(Malaysia) Fayadh Zulkifli	1+5	0	1+1	0	0	0	8	0
25	FW	(Brazil) Rafael Holstein	3+2	0	1	1	0	0	6	1
33	MF	(Malaysia) Nik Akif	3+1	0	0	0	0	0	4	0
43	GK	(Malaysia) Farhan Abdul Majid	3	0	0	0	0	0	3	0
47	DF	(Malaysia) Farid Nezal	5	0	1+1	0	0	0	7	0
77	DF	(Thailand) Keron Ornchaiyaphum	3	0	1	0	0	0	4	0
90	FW	(Colombia) Wilmar Jordán	3	1	1	0	0	0	4	1
Players transferred or loaned out during the season
