= 2021 Kedah Darul Aman F.C. season =

Kedah Darul Aman
2021 season
- President: Muhammad Sanusi
- CEO: Khamal Idris Ali
- Head coach: Aidil Sharin
- Stadium: Darul Aman Stadium (Capacity: 32,387)
- Malaysia Super League: 2nd
- Malaysia Cup: Quarter-finals
- AFC Cup: Cancelled
- Top goalscorer: League: Kpah Sherman (13); All: Kpah Sherman (14)
- Highest home attendance: 0
- Lowest home attendance: 0
- Average home league attendance: 0
Home colours	Away colours	Third colours

The 2021 season was Kedah Darul Aman's 13th season in the Malaysia Super League since the league's inception in 2004.

== Management team ==
Position	Name
Head coach	(Singapore) Aidil Sharin
Assistant head coach	(Malaysia) Victor Andrag
Assistant coach	(Malaysia) Abdul Hadi Abdul Hamid
Goalkeeper coach	(Malaysia) Khairul Azman Mohamed
Fitness coach	(Malaysia) Azmi Ibrahim
Team doctor	(Malaysia) Dr. Jasminder Singh
Physiotherapist	(Malaysia) Muhammad Nur'Illya Samsuddin
Medical officer	(Malaysia) Mohd Shahrizal Mohd Nadzir

== Players ==
No.	Name	Nat	Date of birth (age)	Last club	Contract since	Contract ends
Goalkeepers
1	Ilham Amirullah	(Malaysia)	26 February 1994 (age 32)	(Malaysia) Terengganu	2021	2021
18	Ifwat Akmal	(Malaysia)	10 August 1996 (age 30)	Youth team	2016	
55	Shahril Saa'ri	(Malaysia)	7 March 1990 (age 36)	(Malaysia) PDRM	2020	
Defenders
3	Rodney Celvin	(Malaysia)	25 November 1996 (age 29)	(Malaysia) Selangor	2021	2021
13	Fairuz Zakaria	(Malaysia)	25 May 1997 (age 29)	(Malaysia) Penang	2021	2021
15	Rizal Ghazali	(Malaysia)	1 October 1992 (age 34)	(Malaysia) Perlis	2014	
17	Syazwan Tajudin	(Malaysia)	7 January 1994 (age 32)	(Malaysia) Kuala Lumpur City	2021	2021
27	Ariff Farhan	(Malaysia)	14 July 1996 (age 30)	(Malaysia) FELDA United	2021	2021
36	Renan Alves	(Brazil)	17 December 1992 (age 33)	(Indonesia) Borneo	2019	2021
71	Fandi Othman	(Malaysia)	25 April 1992 (age 34)	(Malaysia) Kuala Lumpur City	2021	2021
98	Loqman Hakim	(Malaysia)	22 January 1998 (age 28)	Youth team	2020	2021
Midfielders
4	Asnan Ahmad	(Malaysia)	3 May 1993 (age 33)	(Malaysia) Terengganu	2021	2021
6	Anumanthan Kumar	(Singapore)	14 July 1994 (age 32)	(Singapore) Hougang United	2021	
7	Baddrol Bakhtiar (captain)	(Malaysia)	1 February 1988 (age 38)	Youth team	2005	2021
8	Rabih Ataya	(Lebanon)	16 July 1989 (age 37)	(Malaysia) UiTM	2021	2021
14	Tam Sheang Tsung	(Japan)	24 May 1995 (age 31)	(Japan) Sagan Tosu Youth Team	2020	2021
16	Amirul Hisyam	(Malaysia)	5 May 1995 (age 31)	(Malaysia) Harimau Muda B	2015	2021
19	Aiman Afif	(Malaysia)	18 February 2001 (age 25)	Youth team	2020	2021
20	Fadzrul Danel	(Malaysia)	14 January 1998 (age 28)	Youth team	2019	2021
21	Fayadh Zulkifli	(Malaysia)	14 September 1998 (age 28)	Youth team	2019	2021
22	Syazwan Zainon	(Malaysia)	13 November 1989 (age 37)	(Malaysia) Selangor	2021	2021
77	Azamuddin Akil	(Malaysia)	16 April 1985 (age 41)	(Malaysia) Selangor	2019	
Forwards
9	Kpah Sherman	(Liberia)	3 February 1992 (age 34)	(Malaysia) PKNS	2020	2021
10	Kipré Tchétché	(Ivory Coast)	16 December 1987 (age 38)	(Malaysia) Terengganu	2020	2021
45	Fikhri Zulkiflee	(Malaysia)	22 January 1999 (age 27)	Youth team	2020	2021
Players who left / loan to other club during the season
29	Farhan Roslan	(Malaysia)	3 December 1996 (age 29)	Youth team	2014	2021
30	Zulkhairi Zulkeply	(Malaysia)	2 May 1995 (age 31)	(Malaysia) UiTM	2020	2021
11	Rozaimi Rahman	(Malaysia)	11 June 1992 (age 34)	(Malaysia) Johor Darul Ta'zim II	2021	2021

=== Under-22s registered with first team ===
N	Pos.	Nat.	Name	Age	Notes
19	MF	(Malaysia)	Aiman Afif	20	
40	MF	(Malaysia)	Zhafir Yusoff	22	
41	GK	(Malaysia)	Wan Syazmin Ruzaimi	22	
42	DF	(Malaysia)	Kamil Akmal	22	
43	DF	(Malaysia)	Heshamudin Ahmad	22	
44	FW	(Malaysia)	Afeeq Iqmal	22	
45	FW	(Malaysia)	Fikhri Zulkiflee	22	
46	DF	(Malaysia)	Fareez Amirul	21	
47	MF	(Malaysia)	Akhmall Alias	22	

== Transfers and contracts ==
=== Transfers in ===
Pre-season

No.	Pos	Player	Transferred from	Source
1	GK	(Malaysia) Ilham Amirullah	(Malaysia) Terengganu	Free
	DF	(Malaysia) Asri Mardzuki	(Malaysia) Police	Loan return
13	DF	(Malaysia) Fairuz Zakaria	(Malaysia) Penang	Free
71	DF	(Malaysia) Fandi Othman	(Malaysia) Kuala Lumpur City	Free
17	DF	(Malaysia) Syazwan Tajudin	(Malaysia) Kuala Lumpur City	Free
27	MF	(Malaysia) Ariff Farhan	(Malaysia) FELDA United	Free
	MF	(Malaysia) Hidhir Idris	(Malaysia) Police	Loan return
22	MF	(Malaysia) Syazwan Zainon	(Malaysia) Selangor	Free
6	MF	(Singapore) Anumanthan Kumar	(Singapore) Hougang United	Free
	FW	(Malaysia) Thanabalan Nadarajah	(Malaysia) Perak II	Free
11	FW	(Malaysia) Rozaimi Rahman	(Malaysia) Johor Darul Ta'zim II	Free
3	DF	(Malaysia) Rodney Celvin	(Malaysia) Selangor	Season loan
8	MF	(Lebanon) Rabih Ataya	(Lebanon) Ahed	Season loan

Mid-season

No.	Pos	Player	Transferred from	Source
4	MF	(Malaysia) Asnan Ahmad	(Malaysia) Terengganu	Undisclosed

=== Transfers out ===
Pre-season

No.	Pos	Player	Transferred to	Source
1	GK	(Malaysia) Azri Ghani	(Malaysia) Perak	Free
33	GK	(Malaysia) Asri Muhamad	(Malaysia) Police	Free
17	DF	(Malaysia) Irfan Zakaria	(Malaysia) Kuala Lumpur City	Free
13	DF	(Malaysia) Khairul Helmi	(Malaysia) Melaka United	Free
27	DF	(Malaysia) Hadin Azman	(Malaysia) Kuala Lumpur City	Free
5	DF	(Malaysia) Norfiqrie Talib	Released	
11	DF	(Singapore) Shakir Hamzah	(Malaysia) Perak	Free
14	DF	(Malaysia) Alif Yusof	Released	
93	MF	(Philippines) Amin Nazari	(Philippines) United City	Free
6	MF	(Australia) David Rowley	(Malaysia) Penang	Free
8	FW	(Malaysia) Zaquan Adha	(Malaysia) Negeri Sembilan	Free
14	FW	(Malaysia) Thanabalan Nadarajah	(Malaysia)	Free
99	FW	(Malaysia) Aminuddin Abu Bakar	Released	
29	MF	(Malaysia) Farhan Roslan	(Malaysia) Perak	Season loan

Mid-season

No.	Pos	Player	Transferred to	Source
30	MF	(Malaysia) Zulkhairi Zulkeply	Released	
11	FW	(Malaysia) Rozaimi Rahman		Free

==== Extension of contract ====
Pos	Player	Source
Head coach	(Singapore) Aidil Sharin	2 years contract signed in 2020 until 2022

==== Retained ====
Pos	Player	Source
GK	(Malaysia) Shahril Saa'ri	
GK	(Malaysia) Ifwat Akmal	
DF	(Brazil) Renan Alves	3 years contract signed in 2019
DF	(Malaysia) Rizal Ghazali	
DF	(Malaysia) Loqman Hakim	
DF	(Malaysia) Zulkhairi Zulkeply	
MF	(Malaysia) Fadzrul Danel	3 years contract signed in 2019
MF	(Malaysia) Fayadh Zulkifli	3 years contract signed in 2019
MF	(Malaysia) Azamuddin Akil	
MF	(Malaysia) Aiman Afif	
MF	(Malaysia) Amirul Hisyam	
MF	(Malaysia) Baddrol Bakhtiar	
MF	(Malaysia) Farhan Roslan	
MF	(Malaysia) Tam Sheang Tsung	
FW	(Liberia) Kpah Sherman	1 year contract signed in 2020
FW	(Ivory Coast) Kipré Tchétché	1 year contract signed in 2020
FW	(Malaysia) Faizat Ghazli	

== Friendlies ==
Pre-season

18 February 2021 Friendly	Kedah Darul Aman (Malaysia)	1–1	(Malaysia) Penang	Alor Setar
	Tchétché 30'		Boboev	Stadium: Darul Aman Stadium

21 February 2021 Friendly	Penang (Malaysia)	3–1	(Malaysia) Kedah Darul Aman	Batu Kawan
	Rafael Vitor; Casagrande; Azwan		Farhan	Stadium: Penang State Stadium

24 February 2021 Friendly	Selangor II (Malaysia)	2–3	(Malaysia) Kedah Darul Aman	Shah Alam
	Attram,		Sherman, Baddrol	Stadium: UiTM Stadium

26 February 2021 Friendly	FAM-MSN Project (Malaysia)	1–3	(Malaysia) Kedah Darul Aman	Shah Alam
	Afeeq		Rozaimi, Faizat	Stadium: UiTM Stadium

27 February 2021 Friendly	Kedah Darul Aman (Malaysia)	1–2	(Malaysia) Sarawak United	Alor Setar
	Ataya		Gopi; Tommy	Stadium: Darul Aman Stadium

Mid-season

8 July 2021 Friendly	Kedah Darul Aman (Malaysia)	2–1	(Malaysia) Police	Alor Setar
	Fayadh 78'; Faizat 85'		Kaimbi 65'	Stadium: Darul Aman Stadium

9 July 2021 Friendly	Kedah Darul Aman (Malaysia)	2–1	(Malaysia) Police	Alor Setar
	Aiman 20'; Fadzrul 60'		Syafiq 41'	Stadium: Darul Aman Stadium

== Competitions ==
=== Malaysia Super League ===
==== League table ====
Pos	Team	Pld	W	D	L	GF	GA	GD	Pts	Qualification or relegation
1	Johor Darul Ta'zim (C)	22	18	3	1	50	9	+41	57	Qualification for AFC Champions League group stage
2	Kedah Darul Aman	22	13	4	5	44	28	+16	43	Qualification for AFC Cup group stage
3	Penang	22	12	5	5	37	30	+7	41	
4	Terengganu	22	11	5	6	33	20	+13	38	
5	Selangor	22	10	6	6	45	30	+15	36	

Source: Malaysian Football League
Rules for classification: 1) Points; 2) Goal difference; 3) Number of goals scored.
(C) Champions

==== Fixtures and results ====
Win Draw Loss

5 March 2021 1	Johor Darul Ta'zim	2–0	Kedah Darul Aman	Iskandar Puteri
21:00 UTC+8	Safawi 35'; Insa 68'; Maurício (yellow card) 30'; Velazquez (yellow card) 39'		Sherman (yellow card) 30'	Stadium: Sultan Ibrahim Stadium; Attendance: 0 Referee: Muhammad Nazmi Nasaruddin

9 March 2021 2	Kedah Darul Aman	2–0	Sabah	Alor Setar
21:00 UTC+8	Tchétché 15'; Sherman 21'		Randy (yellow card) 67'	Stadium: Darul Aman Stadium; Attendance: 0 Referee: Suhaimi Mat Hassan

12 March 2021 3	Penang	1–1	Kedah Darul Aman	Penang
21:00 UTC+8	Endrick 14', (yellow card) 51'; Utomo (yellow card) 60'; Azwan (yellow card) 62'; Jafri (yellow card) 64'		Sherman (yellow card) 48', (goal) 85'	Stadium: City Stadium; Attendance: 0 Referee: Noor Azriel Baharuddin

17 March 2021 4	Kedah Darul Aman	3–1	Petaling Jaya City	Alor Setar
21:00 UTC+8	Anumanthan (yellow card) 37'; Baddrol 47', (yellow card) 48'; Sherman 51'; Fayadh 84'		Kogileswaran 39'; Filemon (yellow card) 45'; Tamilmaran (yellow card) 65'; Kugan (yellow card) 90'	Stadium: Darul Aman Stadium; Attendance: 0 Referee: Mohd Fusser Mad Sallih

20 March 2020 5	UiTM	0–1	Kedah Darul Aman	Shah Alam
21:00 UTC+8	Farid (yellow card) 20' (yellow-red card) 54'; Rizam (yellow card) 36'; Bako (yellow card) 59'		Faizat 42'; Amirul (yellow card) 72'	Stadium: UiTM Stadium; Attendance: 0 Referee: Mohd Hasrol Mohd Amir

2 April 2021 6	Kedah Darul Aman	3–1	Sri Pahang	Alor Setar
21:00 UTC+8	Baddrol 37', 71'; Sherman 47' (pen.)		Goulon (red card) 17'; Ashar (yellow card) 21'; Izzat 41'; Tuck (penalty missed); Azam (yellow card) 90'	Stadium: Darul Aman Stadium; Attendance: 0 Referee: Noor Azriel Baharuddin

6 April 2021 7	Selangor	1–2	Kedah Darul Aman	Petaling Jaya
21:00 UTC+8	Buff 33'; Heubach (yellow card) 40'; Khairulazhan (yellow card) 77'; Brendan (yellow card) 79'		Sherman 79' (pen.); Tchétché 84'; Ataya (yellow card) 45'	Stadium: Petaling Jaya Stadium; Attendance: 1,300; Referee: Fusser Sallih

9 April 2021 8	Kedah Darul Aman	1–2	Terengganu	Alor Setar
21:00 UTC+8	Muhammad 39' (o.g.); Ariff (yellow card) 45+1'; Fairuz (yellow card) 75'; Fadzrul (red card) 90+4'; Rodney (red card) 90+5'		da Silva 45+2' (pen.); Azam 60'; Muhammad (yellow card) 35'; Arif (yellow card) 64'; Faisal (yellow card) 90'	Stadium: Darul Aman Stadium; Attendance: 6,000; Referee: Noor Azriel Baharudin

17 April 2021 9	Perak	1–1	Kedah Darul Aman	Ipoh
22:00 UTC+8	Guilherme 58'; Izzuddin (yellow card) 35'; Kenny (yellow card) 52'		Sherman (yellow card) 22', (goal) 78'; Baddrol (yellow card) 90+2'	Stadium: Perak Stadium; Attendance: 1,323; Referee: Suhaimi Mat Hassan

23 April 2021 10	Kedah Darul Aman	3–2	Kuala Lumpur City	Alor Setar
22:00 UTC+8	Fayadh 71'; Tchétché 90+3' (pen.), 90+6'		Paulo Josué 50'; Daniel (yellow card) 55'; Fakrul (yellow card) 66'; Mendoza (yellow card) 67'; Gallifuoco 79'	Stadium: Darul Aman Stadium; Attendance: 1,252; Referee: S. Logeswaran

30 April 2021 11	Melaka United	1–3	Kedah Darul Aman	Krubong
22:00 UTC+8	Nikolić (yellow card) 15', (goal) 37' (pen.); Syamim (yellow card) 72'; Razman (yellow card) 73'		Sherman 18' (pen.), 62'; Baddrol 87'; Ariff (yellow card) 45+1'	Stadium: Hang Jebat Stadium; Attendance: 1,266; Referee: Tuan Mohd Yaasin Tuan Mohd Hanapiah

4 May 2021 12	Kedah Darul Aman	0–1	Johor Darul Ta'zim	Alor Setar
22:00 UTC+8	Amirul (yellow card) 12'; Renan (yellow card) 58'; Davies (yellow card) 79'; Sherman (yellow card) 90+4'; Azamuddin (yellow card) 90+7'		Bergson 90+2' (pen.); Maurício (yellow card) 41'; Velazquez (yellow card) 90+4'	Stadium: Darul Aman Stadium; Attendance: 0 Referee: Razlan Joffri Ali

8 May 2021 13	Sabah	0–1	Kedah Darul Aman	Kota Kinabalu
21:15 UTC+8	Azzizan (yellow card) 28'		Anumanthan (yellow card) 56'; Sherman 79'; Ariff (yellow card) 70'	Stadium: Likas Stadium; Attendance: 2,000; Referee: Tuan Mohd Yaasin Tuan Mohd Hanafiah

13 August 2021 14	Kedah Darul Aman	2–4	Selangor	Alor Setar
21:00 UTC+8	Sherman 24'; Renan (red card) 28'; Anumanthan 44'; Aiman (yellow card) 90+1'	Report	Olusegun 29' (pen.), 75', 90+4'; Danial 30'; Syahmi (yellow card) 80'	Stadium: Darul Aman Stadium; Attendance: 0 Referee: Muhammad Nazmi Nasaruddin

17 August 2021 15	Kedah Darul Aman	4–1	Penang	Alor Setar
21:00 UTC+8	Tchétché 17', 38'; Baddrol 23', (yellow card) 68'; Sherman 55'; Ataya (yellow card) 60'	Report	Boboev (yellow card) 32'; Rowley 32'; Faiz (yellow card) 65'; Jafri (yellow card) 72'	Stadium: Darul Aman Stadium; Attendance: 0 Referee: Mohammad Zamzaidi Katimin

21 August 2021 16	Terengganu	1–2	Kedah Darul Aman	Kuala Nerus
21:00 UTC+8	Arif (yellow card) 45' da Silva 70'; Rahmat (yellow card) 90+4'	Report	Syazwan (yellow card) 42', (goal) 51'; Ataya 45+3'	Stadium: Sultan Mizan Zainal Abidin Stadium; Attendance: 0 Referee: Mohd Hasrol Mohd Amir

25 August 2021 17	Petaling Jaya City	1–4	Kedah Darul Aman	Petaling Jaya
21:00 UTC+8	Sukri (yellow card) 42'; Khyril 61'; Raffi (yellow card) 45+2' (yellow-red card) 70'	Report	Ataya 8'; Sherman (yellow card) 42', (goal) 56'; Prabakaran 45+2' (o.g.); Fayadh 90+3'	Stadium: Petaling Jaya Stadium; Attendance: 0 Referee: Mohd Nafeez Abd Wahab

8 September 2021 18	Kedah Darul Aman	3–3	UiTM	Alor Setar
21:00 UTC+8	Baddrol 37'; Fikhri 74'; Tchétché 80'	Report	Khuzaimi (yellow card) 25'; Buschening 40' (pen.); Kwon 47'; Ariff 64'; Giannelli (yellow card) 86'	Stadium: Darul Aman Stadium; Attendance: 0 Referee: Ku Alauddin Ku Muhammad

1 September 2021 19	Sri Pahang	2–2	Kedah Darul Aman	Kuantan
21:00 UTC+8	Athiu 9'; Yakubu (yellow card) 27'; Loqman 87' (o.g.)	Report	Amirul 11' Renan (yellow card) 57' Fandi (yellow card) 61' Syazwan 67'	Stadium: Darul Makmur Stadium; Attendance: 0 Referee: Hamdan Awang

28 August 2021 20	Kedah Darul Aman	1–0	Perak	Alor Setar
21:00 UTC+8	Sherman (yellow card) 17', (goal) 20'	Report	Nazmi (yellow card) 62'	Stadium: Darul Aman Stadium; Attendance: 0 Referee: Razlan Joffri Ali

4 September 2021 21	Kuala Lumpur City	2–1	Kedah Darul Aman	Cheras
21:00 UTC+8	Morales 6' (pen.); Safee 26'	Report	Tchétché 34'; Syazwan (yellow card) 41'	Stadium: Kuala Lumpur Stadium; Attendance: 0 Referee: Fitri Maskon

12 September 2021 22	Kedah Darul Aman	4–1	Melaka United	Alor Setar
21:00 UTC+8	Tchétché 24', 30'; Renan (yellow card) 43'; Baddrol 66'; Fayadh 69'	Report	Khairul (yellow card) 39'; Adriano 59'; Akmal (yellow card) 80'	Stadium: Darul Aman Stadium; Attendance: 0 Referee: Zulkarnain Zakaria

=== Malaysia Cup ===
==== Group stage ====
The draw for the group stage was held on 15 September 2021.

Pos	Team	Pld	W	D	L	GF	GA	GD	Pts	Qualification	MEL	KED	KLU	NSE
1	Melaka United	6	5	1	0	15	5	+10	16	Quarter-finals	—	2–0	2–1	2–0
2	Kedah Darul Aman	6	4	0	2	13	6	+7	12	Quarter-finals	1–3	—	3–0	3–0 (Note: Negeri Sembilan withdrew from the tournament on 22 October 2021, after 20 players and 4 staff members tested positive for COVID-19; this prompted them to withdraw for the safety of all parties and were advised by the team's medical doctor. As according to MFL's rule book, all of Negeri Sembilan's remaining matches were awarded a 3–0 win to the opposing team.)
3	Kelantan United	6	1	1	4	8	12	−4	4		3–3	1–3	—	0–1
4	Negeri Sembilan	6	1	0	5	1	14	−13	3	Withdrew	0–3	0–3	0–3	—

Source: MFL, FAM
Notes:

27 September 2021 1	Kedah Darul Aman	3–0	Kelantan United	Alor Setar
21:00 UTC +8	Syazwan 13', 58'; Tchétché 45+2'; Ariff (yellow card) 55'	Report		Stadium: Darul Aman Stadium; Attendance: 0 Referee: Mohd Fusser Mad Sallih

30 September 2021 2	Kedah Darul Aman	1–3	Melaka United	Alor Setar
21:00 UTC +8	Sherman 7'; Rizal (yellow card) 55'; Amirul (yellow card) 90+4'	Report	Norde 23'; Ott 39', 52'; Jang (yellow card) 80'; Afiq (yellow card) 90'	Stadium: Darul Aman Stadium; Attendance: 0 Referee: Mohd Fairuzi Mat Desa

29 October 2021 3	Negeri Sembilan	0–3	Kedah Darul Aman
21:00 UTC +8

2 November 2021 4	Kedah Darul Aman	3–0	Negeri Sembilan
21:00 UTC +8

6 November 2021 5	Kelantan United	1–3	Kedah Darul Aman	Sultan Muhammad IV Stadium
21:00 UTC +8	Fakhrul 73'		Syazwan 34'; Baddrol 36'; Fayadh 85'	Attendance: 361; Referee: Razlan Joffri Ali

9 November 2021 6	Melaka United	2–0	Kedah Darul Aman	Hang Jebat Stadium, Malacca
21:00 UTC +8	Ott 24'; Gomes 89'			Attendance: 1,399; Referee: Hamdan bin Awang

==== Quarter-finals ====
14 November 2021 First leg	Kedah Darul Aman	0–0	Johor Darul Ta'zim	Alor Setar
		Report		Stadium: Darul Aman Stadium

18 November 2021 Second leg	Johor Darul Ta'zim	1–0 (1–0 agg.)	Kedah Darul Aman	Iskandar Puteri
	Arif 40'	Report		Stadium: Sultan Ibrahim Stadium

Johor Darul Ta'zim won 1–0 on aggregate.

=== AFC Cup ===
Pos	Team	Pld	W	D	L	GF	GA	GD	Pts	KED	LIO	SGN	PPR
1	(Malaysia) Kedah Darul Aman	0	0	0	0	0	0	0	0	—	Cancelled	—	Cancelled
2	(Singapore) Lion City Sailors	0	0	0	0	0	0	0	0	—	—	Cancelled	—
3	(Vietnam) Saigon	0	0	0	0	0	0	0	0	Cancelled	—	—	Cancelled
4	(Indonesia) Persipura Jayapura	0	0	0	0	0	0	0	0	—	Cancelled	—	—

Source: AFC
Rules for classification: Tiebreakers

Win Draw Loss

==== Group stage ====
22 June 2021 Matchday 1	Kedah Darul Aman (Malaysia)	cancelled	(Indonesia) Persipura Jayapura	Singapore
				Stadium: National Stadium

25 June 2021 Matchday 2	Saigon FC (Vietnam)	cancelled	(Malaysia) Kedah Darul Aman	Singapore
				Stadium: National Stadium

28 June 2021 Matchday 3	Kedah Darul Aman (Malaysia)	cancelled	(Singapore) Lion City Sailors	Singapore
				Stadium: National Stadium

== Statistics ==
=== Appearances and goals ===
Players with no appearances not included in the list.

As of match played 23 Nov 2021

No.	Pos.	Name	League		Malaysia Cup		Total	
No.	Pos.	Name	Apps	Goals	Apps	Goals	Apps	Goals
1	GK	(Malaysia) Ilham Amirullah	0	0	1	0	1	0
3	DF	(Malaysia) (Ghana) Rodney Celvin	14	0	4	0	18	0
4	MF	(Malaysia) Asnan Ahmad	2(2)	0	4(2)	0	10	0
6	MF	(Singapore) Anumanthan Kumar	18(3)	1	2	0	23	1
7	MF	(Malaysia) Baddrol Bakhtiar	21	7	5(1)	1	27	8
8	MF	(Lebanon) Rabih Ataya	18	2	3(1)	0	22	2
9	FW	(Liberia) Kpah Sherman	17	13	5	1	22	14
10	FW	(Ivory Coast) Kipré Tchétché	21	10	4(1)	1	26	11
13	DF	(Malaysia) Fairuz Zakaria	7(5)	0	2(2)	0	16	0
14	MF	(Malaysia) Tam Sheang Tsung	0(1)	0	0	0	1	0
15	DF	(Malaysia) Rizal Ghazali	20	0	5(1)	0	26	0
16	MF	(Malaysia) Amirul Hisyam	15(5)	1	2(3)	0	25	1
17	DF	(Malaysia) Syazwan Tajudin	1	0	0	0	1	0
18	GK	(Malaysia) Ifwat Akmal	7	0	3	0	10	0
19	MF	(Malaysia) Aiman Afif	0(3)	0	1(3)	0	7	0
20	MF	(Malaysia) Fadzrul Danel	3(12)	0	4(2)	0	21	0
21	MF	(Malaysia) Fayadh Zulkifli	1(20)	4	2(4)	0	27	4
22	MF	(Malaysia) Syazwan Zainon	10(4)	2	6	2	20	4
23	MF	(Malaysia) Faizat Ghazli	10(6)	1	0(1)	0	17	1
27	MF	(Malaysia) Ariff Farhan	14(1)	0	4	0	19	0
36	DF	(Brazil) Renan Alves	12	0	6	0	18	0
44	FW	(Malaysia) Afeeq Iqmal	0(1)	0	0	0	1	0
45	FW	(Malaysia) Fikhri Zulkiflee	0(2)	1	0(2)	0	4	1
55	GK	(Malaysia) Shahril Saa'ri	15(2)	0	2	0	19	0
71	DF	(Malaysia) Fandi Othman	4(3)	0	1	0	8	0
77	MF	(Malaysia) Azamuddin Akil	2(15)	0	0(2)	0	19	0
98	DF	(Malaysia) Loqman Hakim	8(2)	0	0	0	10	0
Players transferred out during the season
11	FW	(Malaysia) Rozaimi Rahman	2(7)	0	0	0	9	0
30	DF	(Malaysia) Zulkhairi Zulkeply	0(1)	0	0	0	1	0
