= Renan Alves =

Brazilian footballer

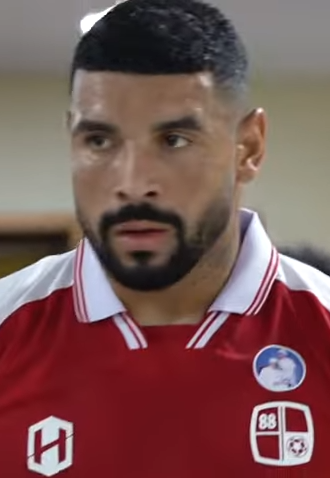
- Alves in 2025

Personal information
- Full name: Renan da Silva Alves
- Date of birth: 17 December 1992 (age 33)
- Place of birth: Rio de Janeiro, Brazil
- Height: 1.91 m (6 ft 3 in)
- Position: Centre-back

Team information
- Current team: Barito Putera
- Number: 36

Senior career*
Years	Team	Apps	(Gls)
2012	Atlético Mogi	9	(1)
2013	União Suzano	17	(1)
2014	Naviraiense	1	(0)
2015	Águia Negra	2	(0)
2015–2016	Gil Vicente	24	(3)
2016–2017	Kapaz	24	(0)
2017	Vojvodina	9	(0)
2018	Murciélagos	8	(3)
2018	Borneo Samarinda	15	(2)
2019–2021	Kedah Darul Aman	40	(5)
2022–2024	Barito Putera	74	(17)
2024–2025	Bekasi City	13	(2)
2025	→ Barito Putera (loan)	14	(2)
2025–	Barito Putera	29	(9)
- * Club domestic league appearances and goals as of 4 October 2026

Renan da Silva Alves (born 17 December 1992) is a Brazilian professional footballer who plays as a centre-back for Championship club Barito Putera.

== Career ==
In June 2016, Renan signed for Azerbaijan Premier League side Kapaz.

In June 2017, Renan moved to Vojvodina, signing a two-year contract.

In January 2019, Renan moved to Kedah Darul Aman, signing a three-year contract.

== Career statistics ==
As of 4 October 2026

Appearances and goals by club, season and competition
Club	Season	League			National Cup		League Cup		Continental		Other		Total	
Club	Season	Division	Apps	Goals	Apps	Goals	Apps	Goals	Apps	Goals	Apps	Goals	Apps	Goals
Gil Vicente	2015–16	LigaPro	24	3	2	0	–		–		–		26	3
Kapaz	2016–17	Azerbaijan Premier League	24	0	2	0	–		4	0	–		30	0
Vojvodina	2017–18	Serbian SuperLiga	9	0	1	0	–		–		–		10	0
Murciélagos	2017–18	Ascenso MX	8	3	2	0	–		–		–		10	3
Borneo Samarinda	2018	Liga 1	15	2	0	0	–		–		–		15	2
Kedah Darul Aman	2019	Malaysia Super League	19	2	7	1	9	1	–		–		35	4
Kedah Darul Aman	2020	Malaysia Super League	9	3	0	0	1	0	2	0	–		12	3
Kedah Darul Aman	2021	Malaysia Super League	12	0	0	0	6	0	0	0	–		18	0
Kedah Darul Aman	Total		40	5	7	1	16	1	2	0	0	0	65	7
Barito Putera	2021–22	Liga 1	14	4	0	0	–		–		–		14	4
Barito Putera	2022–23	Liga 1	32	7	0	0	–		–		–		32	7
Barito Putera	2023–24	Liga 1	28	6	0	0	–		–		–		28	6
Barito Putera	Total		74	17	0	0	0	0	0	0	0	0	74	17
Bekasi City	2024–25	Liga 2	13	2	0	0	–		–		–		13	2
Barito Putera (loan)	2024–25	Liga 1	14	2	0	0	–		–		–		14	2
Barito Putera	2025–26	Championship	25	8	0	0	–		–		–		25	8
Barito Putera	2026–27	Championship	4	1	0	0	–		–		–		4	1
Career total			250	43	14	1	16	1	6	0	0	0	286	45

== Honours ==
Kedah

- Malaysia FA Cup: 2019

Individual

- Malaysia Super League Team of the Season: 2019
- APPI Indonesian Football Award Best XI: 2023–24
