= Fadzrul Danel =

Malaysian footballer

Personal information
- Full name: Mohd Fadzrul Danel bin Mohd Nizam
- Date of birth: 14 January 1998 (age 28)
- Place of birth: Sungai Petani, Kedah, Malaysia
- Height: 1.82 m (6 ft 0 in)
- Position: Central midfielder

Team information
- Current team: Star City

Youth career
- Kedah Darul Aman

Senior career*
Years	Team	Apps	(Gls)
2018–2025	Kedah Darul Aman	98	(5)
2025–	Star City	18	(2)
- * Club domestic league appearances and goals

Mohd Fadzrul Danel bin Mohd Nizam (born 14 January 1998) is a Malaysian professional footballer who plays as a central midfielder for Malaysia Super League club Star City.

== Club career ==
=== Kedah Darul Aman ===
He was part of the Kedah Darul Aman's 2018 Sukma Games team which won the silver medalist. He became the regular during the tournament. His performances during Sukma Games have attracted the interest of Kedah Football Association management. He scores Malaysia FA Cup final and won the cup.

== Career statistics ==
=== Club ===
As of 1 April 2026

Appearances and goals by club, season and competition
Club	Season	League			Cup		League Cup		Continental/Others		Total	
Club	Season	Division	Apps	Goals	Apps	Goals	Apps	Goals	Apps	Goals	Apps	Goals
Kedah Darul Aman	2018	Malaysia Super League	2	0	0	0	2	0	–		4	0
Kedah Darul Aman	2019	Malaysia Super League	17	1	4	1	9	0	–		30	2
Kedah Darul Aman	2020	Malaysia Super League	11	1	–		1	0	2	0	14	1
Kedah Darul Aman	2021	Malaysia Super League	15	0	–		4	0	–		19	0
Kedah Darul Aman	2022	Malaysia Super League	17	0	2	0	0	0	4	0	23	0
Kedah Darul Aman	2023	Malaysia Super League	18	2	1	0	1	0	0	0	20	2
Kedah Darul Aman	2024-25	Malaysia Super League	18	1	2	0	1	0	3	0	24	1
Kedah Darul Aman	Total		98	5	9	1	18	0	9	0	134	6
Immigration	2025–26	Malaysia Super League	18	2	2	0	2	0	2	0	24	2
Career total			116	7	11	1	20	0	11	0	158	8

== Honours ==
Kedah Darul Aman

- Malaysia FA Cup: 2019
- Malaysia Cup runner-up : 2019
- Malaysia Super League runner-up: 2021, 2020
