= 2016 Malaysia Cup final =

- Event: 2016 Malaysia Cup
Kedah	Selangor
(Kedah)	(Selangor)
1	1
- After extra time Kedah won 6–5 on penalties
- Date: 30 October 2016
- Venue: Shah Alam Stadium, Shah Alam, Selangor
- Man of the Match: Rizal Ghazali (Kedah)
- Referee: Mohd Amirul Izwan Yaacob
- Attendance: 79,782

The 2016 Malaysia Cup final was a football match which was played on 30 October 2016, to determine the champion of the 2016 Malaysia Cup. It was the final of the 90th edition of the Malaysia Cup, competition organised by the Football Association of Malaysia.

It was played at the Shah Alam Stadium, in Shah Alam, Selangor, between Selangor and Kedah, in a repeat of the 2015 Final.

== Venue ==
The final was held at the Shah Alam Stadium.

== Road to final ==
Note: In all results below, the score of the finalist is given first.

Kedah				Round	Selangor			
Opponent	Result			Group stage	Opponent	Result		
Sarawak	4–3 (H)			Matchday 1	Kuala Lumpur	1–0 (H)		
(Terengganu) T–Team	0–2 (A)			Matchday 2	Kelantan	3–3 (H)		
Johor Darul Ta'zim II	0–0 (H)			Matchday 3	Pahang	1–0 (A)		
Johor Darul Ta'zim II	2–3 (A)			Matchday 4	Pahang	3–0 (H)		
(Terengganu) T–Team	0–1 (H)			Matchday 5	Kelantan	1–4 (A)		
Sarawak	0–3 (A)			Matchday 6	Kuala Lumpur	1–1 (A)		
Group A winners: Pos / Team / Pld / Pts; 1 / Kedah / 6 / 13; 2 / (Terengganu) T–Team / 6 / 10; 3 / Johor Darul Ta'zim II / 6 / 7; 4 / Sarawak / 6 / 2; Updated to match(es) played on 19 August 2016. Source: FAM FMLLP				Final standings	Group B winners: Pos / Team / Pld / Pts; 1 / Selangor / 6 / 11; 2 / Kelantan / 6 / 10; 3 / Pahang / 6 / 9; 4 / Kuala Lumpur / 6 / 4; Updated to match(es) played on 20 August 2016. Source: FAM FMLLP			
Opponent	Agg.	1st leg	2nd leg	Knockout phase	Opponent	Agg.	1st leg	2nd leg
Negeri Sembilan	5–0	0–0 (A)	5–0 (H)	Quarter-finals	(Selangor) PKNS	5–3	4–3 (A)	1–0 (H)
(Malaysia) PDRM	2–1	2–1 (H)	0–0 (A)	Semi-finals	(Terengganu) T–Team	5–1	2–1 (H)	3–0 (A)

== Match details ==
30 October 2016
21:00 UTC+8

Kedah	1–1	Selangor
Rizal 52'	Report	Hazwan 60'
Penalties
Smeltz (penalty missed); Seung-Hwan (penalty scored); Farhan (penalty scored); Krasniqi (penalty scored); Baddrol (penalty scored); Amirul (penalty missed); Halim (penalty scored); Rizal Ghazali (penalty scored)	6–5	(penalty scored) Ukah; (penalty scored) Wleh; (penalty missed) Azmi; (penalty scored) Olivi; (penalty scored) Veenod; (penalty missed) Hafiz; (penalty scored) Andik; (penalty missed) Rizal Fahmi

Shah Alam Stadium, Shah Alam, Selangor
Attendance: 79,782
Referee: Mohd Amirul Izwan Yaacob

Kedah	Selangor

GK	31	(Malaysia) Ifwat Akmal
RB	15	(Malaysia) Rizal Ghazali
CB	4	(South Korea) Bang Seung-Hwan
CB	3	(Malaysia) Syawal Nordin	(substituted off) 31'
LB	25	(Malaysia) Azmeer Yusof
RM	10	(Malaysia) Baddrol Bakhtiar (c)
CM	8	(Kosovo) Liridon Krasniqi
CM	16	(Malaysia) Amirul Hisyam
LM	22	(Malaysia) Syazwan Zainon	(substituted off) 110'
CF	9	(Brazil) Thiago	(substituted off) 69'
CF	14	(New Zealand) Shane Smeltz
Substitutes:
GK	1	(Malaysia) Abdul Hadi
CB	13	(Malaysia) Khairul Helmi	(substituted in) 31'
MF	18	(Malaysia) Abdul Halim Saari	(substituted in) 69'
MF	19	(Malaysia) Farhan Roslan	(substituted in) 110'
FW	20	(Malaysia) Syafiq Ahmad
MF	23	(Malaysia) Hanif Mat Dzahir
MF	28	(Malaysia) Asri Mardzuki
Manager:
(Malaysia) Tan Cheng Hoe

GK	1	(Malaysia) Khairul Azhan
RB	12	(Malaysia) Bunyamin Umar		(substituted off) 75'
CB	18	(Nigeria) Ugo Ukah
CB	17	(Malaysia) Rizal Fahmi
LB	3	(Malaysia) Azmi Muslim
RM	7	(Indonesia) Andik Vermansyah (c)
CM	23	(Malaysia) S. Veenod
CM	8	(Malaysia) Saiful Ridzuwan		(substituted off) 59'
LM	25	(Malaysia) R. Gopinathan
CF	11	(Malaysia) Hazwan Bakri	(yellow card) 13'	(substituted off) 96'
CF	4	(Liberia) Patrick Wleh
Substitutions:
GK	22	(Malaysia) Norazlan Razali
DF	5	(Malaysia) Shahrom Abdul Kalam
FW	9	(Malaysia) Adam Nor Azlin
DF	13	(Malaysia) Razman Roslan		(substituted in) 75'
DF	15	(Malaysia) Raimi Mohd Nor
FW	16	(Argentina) Mauro Olivi		(substituted in) 96'
MF	21	(Malaysia) Hafiz Kamal		(substituted in) 59'
Manager:
(Malaysia) K. Gunalan

Officials

- Linesmen:

- Fourth official:

Match Rules

- 90 minutes.
- 30 minutes of extra time if necessary.
- Penalty shoot-out if scores still level.
- Seven named substitutes.
- Maximum of three substitutions.

=== Statistics ===
Overall
Statistic	Kedah	Selangor
Goals scored	1	1
Total shots	12	8
Shots on target	5	0
Saves	3	1
Ball possession	59%	41%
Corner kicks	9	5
Fouls committed	14	23
Offsides	3	6
Yellow cards	0	1
Red cards	0	0
