= 2020 Kedah FA season =

Kedah
2020 season
- President: Mukhriz Mahathir
- Manager: Al-Naliq Hasmi Abu Hassan
- Head coach: Aidil Sharin
- Stadium: Darul Aman Stadium (Capacity: 25,000)
- Malaysia Super League: 2nd
- Malaysia FA Cup: Cancelled
- Malaysia Cup: Cancelled
- AFC Champions League: Preliminary round 3
- Top goalscorer: League: Kipré Tchétché; Kpah Sherman (6); All: Kipré Tchétché (10)
Home colours	Away colours	Third colours

The 2020 season was Kedah's 12th season in the Malaysia Super League since its inception in 2004.

== Management team ==
Position	Name
Head coach	(Singapore) Aidil Sharin
Assistant head coach	(Malaysia) Victor Andrag
Assistant coach	(Malaysia) Azmi Mohamed
Goalkeeper coach	(Malaysia) Effendy Kamsah
Fitness coach	(Singapore) Azmi Ibrahim
Team doctor	(Malaysia) Dr. Jasminder Singh
Physiotherapist	(Malaysia) Muhammad Nur'Illya Samsuddin
Medical officer	(Malaysia) Mohd Shahrizal Mohd Nadzir

== Players ==
No.	Name	Nat	Date of birth (age)	Signed from	Contract since	Contract ends
Goalkeepers
1	Azri Ghani	(Malaysia)	30 April 1999 (age 26)	(Malaysia) Felda United	2020	
18	Ifwat Akmal	(Malaysia)	10 August 1996 (age 29)	Youth team	2016	
33	Asri Muhamad	(Malaysia)	2 October 1998 (age 27)	Youth team	2018	
55	Shahril Saa'ri	(Malaysia)	7 March 1990 (age 35)	(Malaysia) PDRM FA	2020	
Defenders
5	Norfiqrie Talib	(Malaysia)	31 January 1996 (age 30)	Youth team	2018	
11	Shakir Hamzah	(Singapore)	20 October 1992 (age 33)	(Singapore) Home United	2019	2020
13	Khairul Helmi	(Malaysia)	31 March 1988 (age 37)	Youth team	2007	
14	Alif Yusof	(Malaysia)	19 January 1991 (age 35)	(Malaysia) Felda United	2019	
15	Rizal Ghazali	(Malaysia)	1 October 1992 (age 33)	(Malaysia) Perlis	2014	
17	Irfan Zakaria	(Malaysia)	4 June 1995 (age 30)	(Malaysia) Kuala Lumpur FA	2020	
25	Azmeer Yusof	(Malaysia)	25 May 1990 (age 35)	(Malaysia) Kuala Lumpur	2019	
27	Hadin Azman	(Malaysia)	2 July 1994 (age 31)	(Malaysia) Felda United	2020	2020
30	Zulkhairi Zulkeply	(Malaysia)	2 May 1995 (age 30)	(Malaysia) UiTM F.C.	2020	
36	Renan Alves	(Brazil)	17 December 1992 (age 33)	(Indonesia) Borneo	2019	2021
98	Loqman Hakim	(Malaysia)	22 January 1998 (age 28)	Youth team	2020	
Midfielders
6	David Rowley	(Australia)	6 February 1990 (age 35)	(Malaysia) Kelantan	2019	2020
7	Baddrol Bakhtiar (captain)	(Malaysia)	1 February 1988 (age 38)	Youth team	2005	
16	Amirul Hisyam	(Malaysia)	5 May 1995 (age 30)	(Malaysia) Harimau Muda B	2015	
19	Aiman Afif	(Malaysia)	18 February 2001 (age 24)	Youth team	2020	
20	Fadzrul Danel	(Malaysia)	14 January 1998 (age 28)	Youth team	2019	2021
21	Fayadh Zulkifli	(Malaysia)	14 September 1998 (age 27)	Youth team	2019	2021
22	Tam Sheang Tsung	(Japan)	24 May 1995 (age 30)	(Japan) Sagan Tosu Youth Team	2020	
29	Farhan Roslan	(Malaysia)	3 December 1996 (age 29)	Youth team	2014	
77	Azamuddin Akil	(Malaysia)	16 April 1985 (age 40)	(Malaysia) Selangor	2019	
93	Amin Nazari	(Philippines)	26 April 1993 (age 32)	(Thailand) Ratchaburi Mitr Phol F.C.	2020	
	Hidhir Idris	(Malaysia)	29 May 1997 (age 28)	Youth team	2017	
Forwards
8	Zaquan Adha	(Malaysia)	3 August 1987 (age 38)	(Malaysia) Kuala Lumpur	2019	2019
9	Kpah Sherman	(Liberia)	3 February 1992 (age 33)	(Malaysia) PKNS F.C.	2020	2020
10	Kipré Tchétché	(Ivory Coast)	16 December 1987 (age 38)	(Malaysia) Terengganu F.C. I	2020	2020
23	Faizat Ghazli	(Malaysia)	28 November 1994 (age 31)	(Malaysia) PKNS F.C.	2020	

== Transfers and contracts ==
=== Pre-Season ===
==== In ====
No	Position	Player	Transferred From	Ref
1	GK	(Malaysia) Azri Ghani	(Malaysia) FELDA United F.C.	Free
21	GK	(Malaysia) Farhan Abu Bakar	(Malaysia) PKNS F.C.	Loan Return
55	GK	(Malaysia) Shahril Saa'ri	(Malaysia) PDRM FA	Free
17	DF	(Malaysia) Irfan Zakaria	(Malaysia) Kuala Lumpur FA	Free
27	DF	(Malaysia) Hadin Azman	(Malaysia) FELDA United F.C.	Free
30	DF	(Malaysia) Zulkhairi Zulkeply	(Malaysia) UiTM F.C.	Free
22	MF	(Japan) Tam Sheang Tsung	(Japan) Sagan Tosu Youth Team	Free
93	MF	(Philippines) Amin Nazari	(Thailand) Ratchaburi Mitr Phol F.C.	Free
9	FW	(Liberia) Kpah Sherman	(Malaysia) PKNS F.C.	
10	FW	(Ivory Coast) Kipré Tchétché	(Malaysia) Terengganu F.C. I	
23	FW	(Malaysia) Faizat Ghazli	(Malaysia) PKNS F.C.	

==== Out ====
No	Position	Player	Transferred To	Ref
21	GK	(Malaysia) Farhan Abu Bakar	(Malaysia) Sarawak United	Free
	GK	(Malaysia) Ramadhan Hamid	(Malaysia) Penang FA	Free
	GK	(Malaysia) Abdul Hadi Hamid	Retired	Free
	DF	(Malaysia) Syazwan Tajudin	(Malaysia)	Free
	DF	(Malaysia) Asri Mardzuki	(Malaysia) PDRM FA	Season loan
	DF	(Malaysia) Syawal Nordin	(Malaysia) Langkawi Glory United F.C. (M3)	Free
	DF	(Malaysia) Fairuz Zakaria	(Malaysia) Penang FA (M2)	Free
	MF	(Malaysia) Hidhir Idris	(Malaysia) PDRM FA	Season loan
	MF	(Malaysia) Shahrul Igwan	(Malaysia) UiTM F.C.	Free
	MF	(Malaysia) Syahrul Azwari	(Malaysia)	Free
	FW	(Kyrgyzstan) Edgar Bernhardt	(Bangladesh) Abahani Limited Dhaka	Free
	FW	(Argentina) Jonatan Bauman	(Indonesia) Arema FC	Free
	FW	(Spain) Fernando Rodríguez	(Malaysia) Johor Darul Ta'zim II F.C. (M2)	Free
	FW	(Malaysia) Thanabalan Nadarajah	(Malaysia) Perak FA II (M2)	Season loan

==== Extension of contract ====
Pos.	Player	Source
GK	(Malaysia) Ifwat Akmal	
DF	(Malaysia) Khairul Helmi	
DF	(Malaysia) Rizal Ghazali	
DF	(Malaysia) Azmeer Yusof	
DF	(Malaysia) Alif Yusof	
DF	(Brazil) Renan Alves	3 years contract signed in 2019
DF	(Singapore) Shakir Hamzah	
DF	(Malaysia) Norfiqrie Talib	2 years signed in 2019
MF	(Malaysia) Azamuddin Akil	
MF	(Malaysia) Baddrol Bakhtiar	
MF	(Malaysia) Amirul Hisyam	
MF	(Malaysia) Fadzrul Danel	3 years contract signed in 2019
MF	(Malaysia) Fayadh Zulkifli	3 years contract signed in 2019
MF	(Malaysia) Farhan Roslan	
MF	(Australia) David Rowley	
MF	(Malaysia) Hidhir Idris	2 years contract signed in 2019
FW	(Malaysia) Zaquan Adha	
FW	(Malaysia) Thanabalan Nadarajah	2 years contract signed in 2019

==== To be confirmed ====
Pos.	Player	Source
MF	(Malaysia) Zhafir Yusoff	

=== Out ===
No	Position	Player	Transferred To	Ref
25	DF	(Malaysia) Azmeer Yusof	Free Agent	Mutual Termination

== Friendlies ==
=== Pre-season Friendlies ===
20 December 2019 Friendly	Kedah (Malaysia)	5–0	(Malaysia) Kedah U21	Kedah
	Farhan Roslan; David Rowley; Shuhei Hoshino; Hadin Azman			Stadium: Alor Star

22 December 2019 Friendly	Kedah (Malaysia)	2–0	(Malaysia) Tambun Tulang	Sintok
	Fayadh Zulkifli; Shakir Hamzah			Stadium: UUM Mini Stadium

30 December 2019 Friendly	Kedah (Malaysia)	3–1	(Malaysia) Perak U21	Sintok
	Zaquan Adha; Kpah Sherman; Hadin Azman			Stadium: UUM Mini Stadium

4 January 2020 Friendly	Kelantan (Malaysia)	2–1	(Malaysia) Kedah	Kota Bahru
	Nazrin Nawi 11'; Amirul Syafiq 55'		Kpah Sherman 35'	Stadium: Sultan Muhammad IV Stadium

6 February 2020 Friendly	Kedah (Malaysia)	1–2	(Malaysia) Kuala Lumpur	Kedah
	Kpah Sherman 90+2'		Jafri Yahya 33'; Kone Kouassi 61'	Stadium: Alor Star

10 February 2020 Friendly	Tambun Tulang (Malaysia)	1–2	(Malaysia) Kedah	Kangar
	29'		Kpah Sherman 10'; Kipre Tchetche 25'	Stadium: Tuanku Syed Putra Stadium

15 February 2020 Friendly	Perak (Malaysia)	3–1	(Malaysia) Kedah	Ipoh
	Shahrul Saad 3'; Shahrel Fikri 43'; Careca 77'		Kpah Sherman 68'	Stadium: Perak Stadium

=== Tour of Cambodia ===
7 January 2020 Friendly	Visakha FC (Cambodia)	0–1	(Malaysia) Kedah	Phnom Penh, Cambodia
			Zaquan Adha 51'	Stadium: Phnom Penh Olympic Stadium

9 January 2020 Friendly	Nagaworld FC (Cambodia)	3–2	(Malaysia) Kedah	Phnom Penh, Cambodia
	35'; 45'; 75'		Hadin Azman 50'; Kipré Tchétché 61'	Stadium: Phnom Penh Olympic Stadium

10 January 2020 Friendly	Boeung Ket Angkor FC (Cambodia)	1–4	(Malaysia) Kedah	Phnom Penh, Cambodia
	70'		Kpah Sherman 10' 50' 65'; Zaquan Adha 80'	Stadium: Phnom Penh Olympic Stadium

12 January 2020 Friendly	Angkor Tiger FC (Cambodia)	0–1	(Malaysia) Kedah	Phnom Penh, Cambodia
			Zaquan Adha 45'	Stadium: Smart RSN Stadium

14 January 2020 Friendly	Phnom Penh Crown FC (Cambodia)	1–2	(Malaysia) Kedah	Phnom Penh, Cambodia
	81'		Kipré Tchétché 76'; Hadin Azman 66'	Stadium: Smart RSN Stadium

=== Mid-season Friendlies ===
8 August 2020 Friendly	Perak FA II (Malaysia)	2-1	(Malaysia) Kedah FA	Perak
	Bruno Bezerra 21'; Yusof Abdullah 68'		Shakir Hamzah 15'	Stadium: Manjung Municipal Council Stadium

10 August 2020 Friendly	UKM F.C. (Malaysia)	1-3	(Malaysia) Kedah FA	Bangi
	Faiz Hanif 25'		Renan Alves 25'; Kipré Tchétché 45'; Kpah Sherman 78'	Stadium: UKM Bangi Stadium

19 August 2020 Friendly	Kedah (Malaysia)	2-3	(Malaysia) Penang FA	Alor Setar
	Faizat Ghazli 20' 28'		Amer Azhar 60' (pen.); Bobby Gonzales 84' (pen.); Rafael Vitor 88' (pen.)	Stadium: Darul Aman Stadium

== Competitions ==
=== Malaysia Super League ===
==== League table ====
Pos	Team	Pld	W	D	L	GF	GA	GD	Pts	Qualification or relegation
1	Johor Darul Ta'zim (C, Q)	11	9	2	0	33	8	+25	29	Qualification for AFC Champions League group stage
2	Kedah (Q)	11	7	1	3	20	13	+7	22	Qualification for AFC Cup group stage
3	Terengganu (Q)	11	6	1	4	24	14	+10	19	Qualification for AFC Cup group stage
4	Perak	11	5	3	3	21	19	+2	18	
5	Selangor	11	4	5	2	26	19	+7	17	

Source: Malaysian Football League
Rules for classification: 1) Points; 2) Goal difference; 3) Number of goals scored.
(C) Champions; (Q) Qualified for the phase indicated

==== Fixtures and results ====
28 February 2020 1	Johor Darul Ta'zim	1–0	Kedah	Johor
21:00 UTC+8	Maurício 44'; Leandro Velazquez (yellow card) 25'; Aidil Zafuan (yellow card) 30'	Report	Baddrol Bakhtiar (yellow card) 5'; Hadin Azman (yellow card) 44'; Shakir Hamzah (yellow card) 49'; Renan Alves (yellow card) 86'	Stadium: Sultan Ibrahim Stadium; Referee: Azlan Jofri Ali

7 March 2020 2	Kedah	3–4	Terengganu F.C. I	Alor Setar
21:00 UTC+8	Renan Alves 20'; Kpah Sherman 23'; Kipré Tchétché 62'; Rizal Ghazali (yellow card) 63'	Report	Dominique Da Sylva 3' 65' 82' 84'; Arif Fadzilah (yellow card) 23'; Rahadiazli Rahalim (yellow card) 36'; Babacar Diallo (yellow card) 70'	Stadium: Darul Aman Stadium; Referee: Hasrol Bin Mohd Amir

11 March 2020 3	UiTM FC	1–1	Kedah	Shah Alam
21:00 UTC+8	Gustavo Almeida 82' (yellow card) 84'; Arif Anwar (yellow card) 45'; Danish Haziq (yellow card) 89'	Report	Kpah Sherman 31' (penalty missed) 61	Stadium: UiTM Stadium; Referee: Ku Alauddin Ku Muhammad

15 March 2020 4	Kedah	2–0	Selangor FA	Alor Setar
21:00 UTC+8	Renan Alves 25'; Kpah Sherman 45'; Rizal Ghazali (yellow card) 35'; Shakir Hamzah (yellow card) 79'; Baddrol Bakhtiar (yellow card) 81'	Report	Halim Saari (yellow card) 33'; Syahmi Safari (yellow card) 52'; Rodney Celvin (yellow card) 73'	Stadium: Darul Aman Stadium; Referee: Zamzaidi Katimin

27 August 2020 5 (Note: The match is postponed following the coronavirus pandemic.)	PDRM FA	0-2	Kedah	Cheras
21:00 UTC+8	Serdar Geldiýew (yellow card) 28'; Eskandar Ismail (yellow card) 80'; Dirga Surdi (yellow card) 90+2'	Report	Kipré Tchétché 30' 36'; Irfan Zakaria (yellow card) 90+2'	Stadium: Kuala Lumpur Stadium; Referee: Razlan Bin Joffri Ali

5 September 2020 6	Kedah	2-1	Petaling Jaya City	Alor Setar
21:00 UTC+8	Washington Brandão 16'; D. Kugan (yellow card) 86'	Report	Kpah Sherman 24'; Kipré Tchétché 69' (yellow card) 80'; Irfan Zakaria (yellow card) 45'	Stadium: Darul Aman Stadium; Referee: Fusser bin Mad Sallih

12 September 2020 7	Felda United	1-2	Kedah	Jengka
21:00 UTC+8	Syahmi Zamri 44'	Report	Kipré Tchétché 48'; Hadin Azman 66'; Shakir Hamzah (yellow card) 32'; Irfan Zakaria (yellow card) 62'; Shahril Saari (yellow card) 90+3'	Stadium: Tun Abdul Razak Stadium; Referee: Mat Zan Abdul Wahab

21 September 2020 8	Kedah	3-1	Sabah FA	Alor Setar
21:00 UTC+8	Kpah Sherman 23'; Kipré Tchétché 62'; Fayadh Zulkifli 75'; Rizal Ghazali (yellow card) 68'; Azamuddin Akil (yellow card) 87'	Report	Dennis Buschening 28'; Randy Baruh (yellow card) 55'; Rawilson Batuil (yellow card) 60'	Stadium: Darul Aman Stadium; Referee: Shafarizam Baderon

26 September 2020 9	Pahang	2-1	Kedah	Kuantan
21:00 UTC+8	Adam Reed 41'; Nik Sharif Haseefy 46'; Herold Goulon (yellow card) 28'; Fazly Mazlan (yellow card) 69'	Report	Kipré Tchétché 15'; Kpah Sherman (yellow card) 45'; Norfiqrie Talib (yellow card) 65'	Stadium: Darul Makmur Stadium; Referee: Razlan Joffri Ali

5 October 2020 10	Kedah	1-0	Melaka United	Alor Setar
21:00 UTC+8	Shakir Hamzah 19'	Report		Stadium: Darul Aman Stadium; Referee: Nazim Bin Haji Idris

10 October 2020 11	Perak	2-3	Kedah	Ipoh
21:00 UTC+8	Leandro Dos Santos 42' (pen.) 45+3' (yellow card) 45+4'	Report	Kpah Sherman 28'; Fadzrul Danel 31'; Renan Alves 63'; Shakir Hamzah (yellow card) 23'; Amirul Hisyam (yellow card) 45+1'; Kipre Tchetche (yellow card) 45+4'; Rizal Ghazali (yellow card) 87'	Stadium: Perak Stadium; Referee: Razlan Joffri Ali

=== Malaysia Cup ===
6 November 2020 Round 1	Kedah	3-2	Pahang FA	Alor Setar
21:00 UTC+8	Shakir Hamzah 17'; Kpah Sherman 35'; Kipré Tchétché 43'; Renan Alves (yellow card) 78'; Alif Yusof (yellow card) 90'	Report	Muslim Ahmad 49' (yellow card) 88'; Faizal Abd Rani 88'; Dickson Nwakaeme (penalty missed) 79	Stadium: Darul Aman Stadium; Referee: Nazmi Nasaruddin

=== AFC Champions League ===
Win Draw Loss

==== Qualifying play-off ====
21 January 2020 Preliminary round 2	Kedah FA (Malaysia)	5–1	(Hong Kong) Tai Po FC	Alor Setar
	Kipré Tchétché 4' 23' 90+2'; Hadin Azman 47' 67'	Report	Chan Man Fai 68'	Stadium: Darul Aman Stadium; Referee: Saoud Al Athbah (Qatar)

28 January 2020 Preliminary round 3	FC Seoul (South Korea)	4–1	(Malaysia) Kedah FA	Seoul
	Park Chu-young 39' (pen.); Park Dong-jin 49'; Barba 63'; Alibaev 90+2'		Barba 52' (o.g.)	Stadium: Seoul World Cup Stadium; Referee: Omar Al-Yaqoubi (Oman)

== Statistics ==
=== Appearances and goals ===
No.	Pos.	Name	League		FA Cup		Malaysia Cup		ACL		Total	
No.	Pos.	Name	Apps	Goals	Apps	Goals	Apps	Goals	Apps	Goals	Apps	Goals
1	GK	(Malaysia) Azri Ghani	2(1)	0	0	0	1	0	0	0	4	0
5	DF	(Malaysia) Norfiqrie Talib	4(1)	0	0	0	0	0	0	0	5	0
6	MF	(Australia) David Rowley	0(4)	0	0	0	0	0	1	0	5	0
7	MF	(Malaysia) Baddrol Bakhtiar	10	0	0	0	1	0	2	0	13	0
8	FW	(Malaysia) Zaquan Adha	0(6)	0	0	0	0	0	1	0	7	0
9	FW	(Liberia) Kpah Sherman	11	6	0	0	1	1	2	0	14	7
10	FW	(Ivory Coast) Kipré Tchétché	11	6	0	0	1	1	2	3	14	10
11	DF	(Singapore) Shakir Hamzah	10	1	0	0	1	1	0	0	11	2
13	DF	(Malaysia) Khairul Helmi	0(1)	0	0	0	0	0	0	0	1	0
14	DF	(Malaysia) Alif Yusof	0(3)	0	0	0	0(1)	0	2	0	6	0
15	DF	(Malaysia) Rizal Ghazali	10	0	0	0	1	0	2	0	13	0
16	MF	(Malaysia) Amirul Hisyam	9	0	0	0	1	0	0	0	10	0
17	DF	(Malaysia) Irfan Zakaria	8(1)	0	0	0	1	0	2	0	12	0
18	GK	(Malaysia) Ifwat Akmal	5	0	0	0	0	0	1	0	6	0
20	MF	(Malaysia) Fadzrul Danel	5(6)	1	0	0	0(1)	0	0(2)	0	14	1
21	MF	(Malaysia) Fayadh Zulkifli	0(4)	1	0	0	0	0	0(1)	0	5	1
23	MF	(Malaysia) Faizat Ghazli	4	0	0	0	1	0	0	0	5	0
27	DF	(Malaysia) Hadin Azman	7(3)	1	0	0	0(1)	0	2	2	13	3
29	MF	(Malaysia) Farhan Roslan	0(1)	0	0	0	0	0	0(1)	0	2	0
30	DF	(Malaysia) Zulkhairi Zulkeply	0(1)	0	0	0	0	0	0(2)	0	3	0
36	DF	(Brazil) Renan Alves	9	2	0	0	1	0	2	0	12	2
55	GK	(Malaysia) Shahril Saa'ri	4(1)	0	0	0	0	0	1	0	6	0
77	FW	(Malaysia) Azamuddin Akil	2(5)	0	0	0	0(1)	0	0	0	8	0
93	DF	(Philippines) Amin Nazari	7(1)	0	0	0	1	0	2	0	11	0
Players who have played this season and/or sign for the season but had left the club or on loan to other club
25	DF	(Malaysia) Azmeer Yusof	3	0	0	0	0	0	0	0	3	0

Statistics accurate as of 8 August 2019.
