= Azmin Azram =

Malaysian footballer

Personal information
- Full name: Azmin Azram Abdul Aziz
- Date of birth: 1 April 1976 (age 50)
- Place of birth: Selangor, Malaysia
- Height: 1.81 m (5 ft 11 in)
- Position: Goalkeeper

Team information
- Current team: Công An Hà Nội (Goalkeeping coach)

Youth career
- 1992: Kuala Lumpur FA

Senior career*
Years	Team	Apps	(Gls)
1993–1998	Kuala Lumpur FA	129	(0)
1999	Negeri Sembilan FA	29	(0)
2000–2003	Selangor FA	79	(0)
2004–2005	Pahang FA	31	(0)
2006	Selangor MPPJ	19	(0)
Total		305	(0)

International career
1995–2006	Malaysia	28	(0)

Managerial career
- 2017–2022: Malaysia (Goalkeeping coach)
- 2023–: Công An Hà Nội (Goalkeeping coach)
- * Club domestic league appearances and goals

Azmin Azram Abdul Aziz (born 1 April 1976) is a Malaysian former footballer. He represented four state teams and one club team in his career. He also represented Malaysia from 1998 to 2004.

Currently Azmin is the goalkeeping coach of V.League 1 club Công An Hà Nội.

== Playing career ==
Azmin started his career with Kuala Lumpur FA youth team.

In 2002, Azmin was call up for an international friendly match against five times World Cup winners Brazil. He was selected as one of the first eleven to play against Brazilian stars such as Ronaldo and Barca's Ronaldinho.

He was guided by former Malaysia goalkeeper, Abdul Rashid Hassan and Lim Chuan Chin. Under the duo's guidance, Azmin earned the status of Malaysia's number one goalkeeper from 2002 to 2004 before his place was taken by Mohd Syamsuri Mustafa.

At the age of 30, he choose to retire after receiving knee injury. He has since worked as goalkeeper coach and scout talent at the National Sports Council.

== Coaching career ==
=== Malaysia ===
On 4 April 2017, Azmin was chosen by head coach Tan Cheng Hoe to be part of his backroom staff where he was given the goalkeeper coach role until 16 February 2022.

=== Công An Hà Nội ===
In January 2023, Azmin joined Vietnamese club Công An Hà Nội as their goalkeeping coach.

== Honours ==
Kuala Lumpur

- Malaysia FA Cup: 1993, 1994, 1999

Selangor

- Malaysia Premier 1: 2000
- Malaysia FA Cup: 2001
- Malaysia Cup: 2002

Pahang

- Malaysia Super League: 2004

Malaysia

- Merdeka Tournament runner-up: 2000
