= Vinicius Milani =

Brazilian footballer

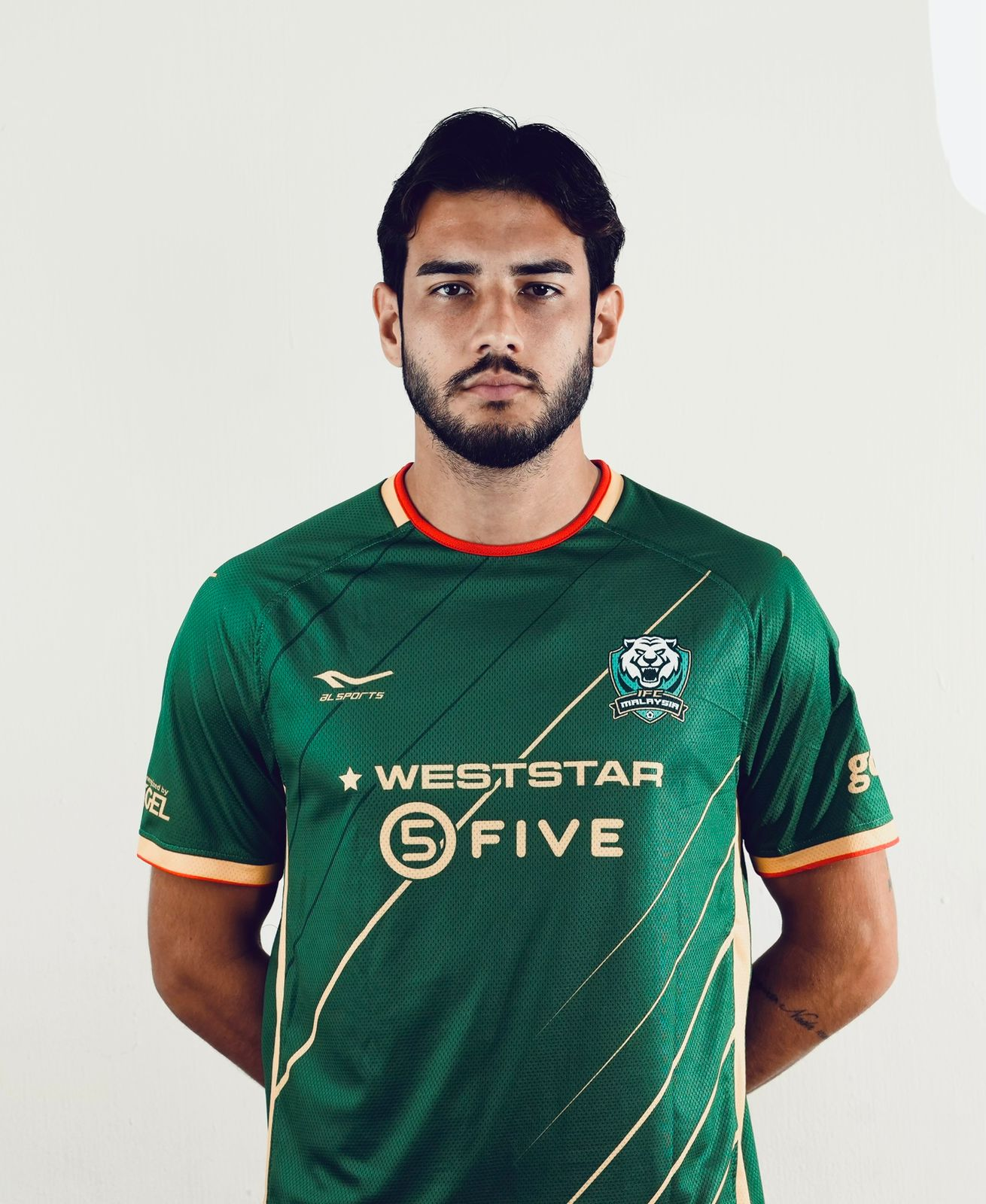
- Milani with Immigration in 2026

Personal information
- Full name: Vinicius Milani Bueno
- Date of birth: 29 August 2001 (age 25)
- Place of birth: Valinhos, Brazil
- Height: 1.90 m (6 ft 3 in)
- Position: Centre-back

Youth career
- –2012: Amparo
- 2013–2019: Ponte Preta
- 2020–2021: Real Brasília
- 2020–2021: → Flamengo (loan)

Senior career*
Years	Team	Apps	(Gls)
2022–2023	Real Brasília	0	(0)
2022–2023	→ Aimoré (loan)	23	(1)
2023	→ Portuguesa (loan)	0	(0)
2024–2025	Marcílio Dias	27	(2)
2024	→ Treze (loan)	16	(1)
2025–2026	Immigration	21	(0)
- * Club domestic league appearances and goals as of 20:31, 12 July 2026 (UTC)

Vinicius Milani Bueno (born 29 August 2001), simply known as Milani, is a Brazilian professional footballer who plays as a central defender.

== Club career ==
Born in Valinhos, São Paulo, Milani began his career with Amparo and later signed for Ponte Preta, where he was released in 2019. He subsequently moved to Real Brasília, and joined Flamengo on loan on 3 February 2020.

On 27 September 2020, after a COVID-19 outbreak made most of the first team squad unavailable, Milani was called up for a Série A match against Palmeiras, but remained an unused substitute in the 1–1 draw; he later himself tested positive for the disease on 3 October. He then returned to the under-20 team, before leaving the club on 25 December 2021.

Milani moved to Aimoré on loan on 24 March 2022. He made his senior debut on 24 April, replacing Wesley Pacheco late into a 1–0 Série D away win over Próspera, and scored his first goal on 16 July, netting the equalizer in a 3–2 win at Marcílio Dias.

After being a regular starter during both the 2022 Série D and the 2023 Campeonato Gaúcho, Milani left Aimoré in April 2023. On 6 June, still owned by Real Brasília, he signed for Portuguesa until the following April.

== Career statistics ==
As of 1 November 2023

Club	Season	League			State League		Cup		Continental		Other		Total	
Club	Season	Division	Apps	Goals	Apps	Goals	Apps	Goals	Apps	Goals	Apps	Goals	Apps	Goals
Aimoré	2022	Série D	13	1	—		—		—		7 (Note: Appearance(s) in Copa FGF)	0	20	1
Aimoré	2023	Série D	0	0	10	0	—		—		—		10	0
Aimoré	Total		13	1	10	0	—		—		7	0	30	1
Portuguesa	2023	Paulista	—		0	0	—		—		4 (Note: Appearance(s) in Copa Paulista)	0	4	0
Career total			13	1	10	0	0	0	0	0	11	0	34	1

== Honours ==
Flamengo

- Campeonato Carioca: 2021
