= Abdul Rashid Hassan =

Malaysian footballer

Personal information
- Date of birth: July 17, 1954
- Place of birth: Malacca, Malaysia
- Position: Goalkeeper

Senior career*
Years	Team	Apps	(Gls)
- Selangor F.C.
- Kuala Lumpur City F.C.

International career
1975–1989	Malaysia	41	(0)
- * Club domestic league appearances and goals

Abdul Rashid Hassan (born 17 July 1954 in Malacca) is a former Selangor FA, Kuala Lumpur FA and Malaysia goalkeeper.

== Career overview ==
He helped Kuala Lumpur win the Malaysia Cup hat-trick in 1987, 1988 and 1989.

With the Malaysia national team, he won two gold medal the 1977 and 1989 SEA Games. He also was a part of Malaysia squad in a 1–1 draw against England B in 1978, coached by Bobby Robson.

Overall he earn 41 international caps for Malaysia between 1975 and 1989.

== Honours ==
Selangor

- Malaysia Cup: 1975, 1976, 1978

Kuala Lumpur

- Malaysian League: 1988
- Malaysia Cup: 1987, 1988, 1989
- Malaysia Charity Shield: 1988

Malaysia

- SEA Games: 1977, 1989
