= Noah Leddel =

Filipino footballer (born 2003)

Personal information
- Full name: Noah River Leddel
- Date of birth: 30 August 2003 (age 23)
- Place of birth: London, England
- Height: 6 ft 1 in (1.86 m)
- Position: Centre-back

Team information
- Current team: Star City

Youth career
- Northwood School
- 2017–2021: Hong Kong FC

College career
Years	Team	Apps	(Gls)
2023	Yale Bulldogs	3	(0)

Senior career*
Years	Team	Apps	(Gls)
2020	Ventura County Fusion	0	(0)
2021–2024	Black Rock	9	(0)
2025–2026	Dynamic Herb Cebu	6	(2)
2026	Ayutthaya United	5	(0)
2026–	Star City	0	(0)

International career^{‡}
2023–	Philippines U23	6	(1)
2026–	Philippines	3	(0)
- * Club domestic league appearances and goals as of 10 May 2026 ‡ National team caps and goals as of 28 July 2026

Noah River Leddel (born 30 August 2003) is a professional footballer who plays as a centre-back for Malaysia Super League club Star City. Born in England, he plays for the Philippines national team.

== Early life and youth career ==
Leddel was born in Westminster in London, England. While living in Hong Kong, Leddel played football for the youth team of Hong Kong FC while pursuing an education at Hong Kong International School. In 2021, he moved to Northwood School in New York. In 2023, he was welcomed as a student-athlete to the soccer team of Yale University as part of its class of 2027. He made 3 appearances in his freshman season.

== Club career ==
=== United States ===
While playing youth football, Leddel played for Ventura County Fusion. In 2021, he signed for USL League Two side Black Rock while still studying in Northwood. He made nine appearances in the 2022 season, staying with the club periodically until 2024.

=== Philippines ===
In August 2025, Leddel signed his first contract in his home country, signing for PFL side Dynamic Herb Cebu as part of the club's preparations in the ASEAN Club Championship. He made his debut in the qualifiers of the tournament, a 2–1 loss to Brunei's Kasuka, while also playing in the backline in the second leg, where Cebu won 3–0 to clinch qualification.

=== Thailand ===
After six top-flight matches, in which he scored two goals, he moved to Thailand in January 2026. There, he signed for top-flight side Ayutthaya United. After five league matches, his contract was not renewed in the summer of 2026.

=== Malaysia ===
On 1 August 2026, it was announced that Leddel had signed a contract with the to join Malaysia Super League club Star City.

== International career ==
Leddel was born to a Filipina mother, making him eligible to represent the country internationally. He received his first national team call up in 2023, where he represented the Philippines under-23 team in the 2023 Southeast Asian Games. After a nearly two year-long hiatus, he returned to play centre-back for the U23s in the 2025 ASEAN U-23 Championship. The Philippines upset Malaysia on the opening matchday and made it to the semifinals for the first time, finishing fourth overall.

In November 2025, Leddel received his first call-up to the Philippine senior team as he was included in the 22-man squad for the 2027 AFC Asian Cup qualifier against Maldives.

== Career statistics ==
=== International ===
As of match played 28 July 2026

Appearances and goals by national team and year
National team	Year	Apps	Goals
Philippines	2026	3	0
Total		3	0

== Personal life ==
Born in Westminster, to a Filipino mother and American father, Leddel holds British, American and Filipino citizenships.

His footballing idol is Sergio Ramos.
