= Mehmet Duraković =

Association football player and coach

Personal information
- Full name: Mehmet Duraković
- Date of birth: 13 October 1965 (age 61)
- Place of birth: Titograd, SR Montenegro, SFR Yugoslavia
- Position: Defender

Team information
- Current team: Star City (head coach)

Youth career
- 1980–1982: Footscray JUST
- 1983: Port Melbourne Sharks
- 1984: Budućnost Titograd

Senior career*
Years	Team	Apps	(Gls)
1985–1988	Brunswick Juventus	61	(2)
1988	→ Footscray JUST (loan)	25	(1)
1989–1995	South Melbourne	138	(5)
1995–1998	Selangor		
1998–1999	Sydney Olympic	21	(0)
1999–2000	Gippsland Falcons	25	(0)
2000–2004	South Melbourne	98	(1)
Total		450	(12)

International career
1990–2002	Australia	64	(6)

Managerial career
- 2003–2005: Port Melbourne Sharks
- 2005–2007: FFV NTC
- 2008–2011: Melbourne Victory Youth
- 2011: Melbourne Victory (Caretaker)
- 2011–2012: Melbourne Victory
- 2014–2015: Selangor
- 2017–2021: Perak
- 2026–: Star City
Medal record
Representing Australia
Men's Association football
OFC Nations Cup
Runner-up	2002 New Zealand
- * Club domestic league appearances and goals

Mehmet Duraković (Albanian: Mehmet Duraku, born 13 October 1965) is a football coach and former player. Born in Titograd, Yugoslavia, now Podgorica, Montenegro, he spent his playing career as a defender for several clubs in the Australian National Soccer League (NSL), with a brief stint in Malaysia with Selangor FA. Duraković made 64 appearances and scored six goals for the Australian national team. He is currently the head coach of Malaysia Super League club Star City.

== Early life ==
Mehmet Duraković was born in Montenegro into an Albanian family. Early in Duraković's childhood, his family left Yugoslavia and emigrated to Australia to seek better work and opportunities for their growing children. Duraković's official playing days began with the Footscray juniors, and he moved on to Port Melbourne juniors when his family moved to the inner-city suburbs. He was with Port Melbourne from Under-10s to Under-16s.

After living in Australia for ten years, Duraković's parents moved back to Montenegro. Although Duraković was unhappy, he began to take soccer more seriously and played with local clubs in lower divisions. However, in just over a year Budućnost Titograd, who played in the Yugoslav First League, asked him to join them. Duraković returned to Australia in 1984 by himself and immediately joined the Port Melbourne senior team. After a month, he had been signed by NSL club Brunswick Juventus.

== Club career ==
=== Early career ===
Duraković was a defender for Brunswick Juventus from 1985 to 1988, making 61 appearances and scoring two goals for the club. He spent most of his first year at Juventus in the reserves or on the bench for the seniors. He came off the bench a couple of times in 1985 but did not make his full debut until late that season. His second game for Juventus was the grand final against Sydney City. He was part of Juventus' 1985 NSL Championship winning team.

Brunswick was relegated from the NSL by 1988. Duraković was loaned out to Footscray JUST in 1988 for one year. He made 25 appearances and one goal before moving to South Melbourne.

=== South Melbourne Hellas ===
Durakovic made 138 appearances and scored five goals in his first sting at the club from 1989 to 1995. He was part of South Melbourne's famous 1991 NSL Championship winning team led by Ferenc Puskas.

Durakovic's performances at the club led him to becoming one of Australia's top defenders and a fan favourite at the club.

In his final move, Duraković returned to South Melbourne in 2000. He was named as part of South's Team of the Century in 2000.

Despite his age, Durakovic led South to a top of the table finish in 2000/01, narrowly losing the Grand Final to Wollongong.

Durakovic announced that he would retire at the conclusion of the 2003/04 NSL season. At South Melbourne's final home National League Soccer match, the Hellas fans stormed the field at full time and carried Durakovic off.

Durakovic would make a further 98 appearances for Hellas scoring one goal.

In 1990 and 1992, Durakovic was twice awarded the Theo Marmaras medal for being the player of the season at South Melbourne.

=== Later career ===
In 1994, Duraković moved to Malaysia, where he played for Selangor until he returned to Australia and joined Sydney Olympic in 1998. His next NSL club was the Gippsland Falcons, where he returned as the Falcons' key defender, sparking renewed interest from across the NSL despite being in his mid-thirties.

== International career ==
Duraković played 64 times for the Australian national team from 1990 to 2002, including several FIFA World Cup qualification campaigns. In the qualifying campaign for the 1994 World Cup, he scored a goal against Canada to level the tie on aggregate. In the subsequent play-off against Argentina, he marked Diego Maradona.

== Managerial career ==
Duraković's coaching career began with the Port Melbourne Sharks in 2003. He then became coach of the Victorian Institute of Sport Football Program. In 2008, Duraković was appointed the inaugural coach of the Melbourne Victory Youth Team until 2011, when he was appointed caretaker coach of the Melbourne Victory FC senior team after Ernie Merrick was sacked during Victory's Asian Champions League campaign.

Under Duraković as caretaker head coach, Melbourne Victory won one of their remaining Asian Champions League fixtures and tied the others. Subsequently, in June 2011, Duraković was named as Merrick's permanent replacement.

As Melbourne Victory's coach, he signed Isaka Cernak, Tando Velaphi, Marco Rojas, James Jeggo, Jean Carlos Solórzano, Harry Kewell, Fabio, Lawrence Thomas and Ante Čović.

Under the weight of expectation, particularly in light of Kewell's arrival, Melbourne Victory started the 2011–12 A-League season poorly, failing to score in their first three games and remaining without a win until Round 4. As the season progressed, Melbourne Victory's performances remained inconsistent, and following successive away losses against Brisbane Roar and Central Coast Mariners which saw Victory fall to the eighth position, in January 2012 Duraković was sacked.

In November 2012, Duraković was appointed as senior technical director at Victorian Premier League club South Melbourne.

From 2013 to 2015, Duraković was manager and head coach of Selangor FA, the team he had played for in the 1990s. Duraković managed to make them become the runners-up in the 2014 Malaysian Super League, quarter-finalist of the 2014 Malaysian Cup. He also signed former Indonesian international football player Andik Vermansyah from Persebaya 1927 and former Australian international football player Robert Cornthwaite from Jeonnam Dragons for the 2015 Malaysian Super League season, as well as Leandro Dos Santos from T-Team F.C. and Guilherme de Paula Lucrécio from FC Milsami Orhei. In 2015, Selangor their 33rd Malaysia Cup title as well as finishing runner-up again in the Super League.

In February 2017, Duraković took over as head coach of another Malaysian Super League side, Perak F.C., after the club terminated their former head coach's contract. In October 2018, Duraković brought Perak to the 92nd Malaysia Cup finals and won against Terengganu on penalties with a score of 3–3. He also lead Perak to the 2019 FA Cup finals. In February 2021, Duraković and Perak agreed on mutual termination of contract, days before the start of the 2021 league season.

== Managerial statistics ==
As of match played 21 November 2026

Managerial record by team and tenure
Team	Nat.	From	To	Record					Ref.
Team	Nat.	From	To	G	W	D	L	Win %	Ref.
Melbourne Victory	(Australia)	21 June 2011	6 January 2012	19	4	9	6	21.05	
Selangor	(Malaysia)	1 November 2013	31 December 2015	73	35	19	19	47.95	
Perak	(Malaysia)	22 February 2017	22 February 2021	116	50	36	30	43.10	
Star City	(Malaysia)	9 June 2026	Present	11	3	4	4	27.27	
Career Total				219	92	68	59	42.01	

== Honours ==
=== Player ===
Brunswick Juventus

- NSL Championship: (1) 1986

South Melbourne

- NSL Championship: (1) 1990–91
- NSL Premiers: (1) 2000–01
- Dockerty Cup: 1989, 1991, 1993
- NSL Cup: 1989-90

Selangor

- Malaysia Cup: (3) 1995,1996,1997
- M-League: (Runner-up) 1995

Australia

- OFC Nations Cup: runner-up 2002

=== As coach/manager ===
Selangor:

- M-League: (Runner-up) 2014, 2015
- Malaysia Cup: (1) 2015

Perak

- M-League: (Runner-up) 2018
- Malaysia FA Cup: runners-up 2019
- Malaysia Cup: (1) 2018

Individual

- Theo Marmaras medal: 1990,1992
- Pingat Jasa Kebaktian (The Meritorious Service Medal in Malaysia): 1995
- South Melbourne's Team of the Century: 2000
- Darjah Ahli Mahkota Perak (Malaysia): 2018
- FAM Football Awards – Best Coach: 2018
