= Loqman Hakim =

Malaysian footballer

Personal information
- Full name: Mohd Loqman Hakim bin Marzuki
- Date of birth: 22 January 1998 (age 28)
- Place of birth: Kedah, Malaysia
- Height: 1.76 m (5 ft 9 in)
- Position: Defender

Team information
- Current team: Immigration
- Number: 13

Youth career
- 2016–2019: Kedah Darul Aman U21

Senior career*
Years	Team	Apps	(Gls)
2019–2025	Kedah Darul Aman	37	(0)
2025–	Immigration	1	(0)
- * Club domestic league appearances and goals as of 11 September 2025

Mohd Loqman Hakim bin Marzuki (born 22 January 1998) is a Malaysian professional footballer who plays as a defender for Malaysia Super League club Immigration.

== Career statistics ==
=== Club ===
As of 11 September 2025

Appearances and goals by club, season and competition
Club	Season	League			Cup		League Cup		Continental/Other		Total	
Club	Season	Division	Apps	Goals	Apps	Goals	Apps	Goals	Apps	Goals	Apps	Goals
Kedah Darul Aman	2019	Malaysia Super League	1	0	0	0	0	0	–		1	0
Kedah Darul Aman	2020	Malaysia Super League	0	0	0	0	0	0	0	0	0	0
Kedah Darul Aman	2021	Malaysia Super League	10	0	0	0	0	0	–		10	0
Kedah Darul Aman	2022	Malaysia Super League	7	0	1	0	0	0	0	0	8	0
Kedah Darul Aman	2023	Malaysia Super League	7	0	1	0	0	0	0	0	8	0
Kedah Darul Aman	2024–25	Malaysia Super League	12	0	1	0	2	0	4 (Note: Appearances in MFL Challenge Cup)	0	19	0
Kedah Darul Aman	Total		37	0	3	0	2	0	4	0	46	0
Immigration	2025–26	Malaysia Super League	1	0	0	0	0	0	–		1	0
Immigration	Total		1	0	0	0	0	0	0	0	1	0
Career total			38	0	3	0	2	0	4	0	47	0
