= Nik Akif =

Malaysian footballer

Personal information
- Full name: Nik Akif Syahiran bin Nik Mat
- Date of birth: 11 May 1999 (age 27)
- Place of birth: Kuala Krai, Kelantan, Malaysia
- Height: 1.68 m (5 ft 6 in)
- Position: Midfielder

Team information
- Current team: Immigration
- Number: 33

Youth career
- 2016: Bukit Jalil Sports School
- 2017: Kelantan U21

Senior career*
Years	Team	Apps	(Gls)
2018–2020	Kelantan	43	(9)
2021–2022	Terengganu	17	(1)
2022	→ Kelantan United (loan)	8	(0)
2023–2024	Penang	43	(5)
2025–	Immigration	2	(0)

International career^{‡}
2017–2018	Malaysia U19	15	(5)
2017–2022	Malaysia U23	12	(0)
2018–	Malaysia	4	(0)
Medal record
Men's football
Representing Malaysia
AFF U-19 Youth Championship
First place	2018 Indonesia
Second place	2017 Myanmar
- * Club domestic league appearances and goals as of 20 September 2025 ‡ National team caps and goals as of 29 November 2019

Nik Akif Syahiran bin Nik Mat (born 11 May 1999) is a Malaysian professional footballer who plays as a midfielder for Malaysia Super League club Immigration and the Malaysia national team.

Born in Kuala Krai in state of Kelantan, Nik Akif started his career at Bukit Jalil Sports School before joined Kelantan youth team in 2017.

== Club career ==
=== Kelantan ===
On 11 November 2017, it was announced that Nik Akif has been promoted to the Kelantan's first team for 2018 season. On 3 February 2018, Nik Akif made his first league appearance for Kelantan in a 1–2 defeat over Melaka United coming off bench for Fadhilah Pauzi.

=== Terengganu ===
On 8 December 2020, Nik Akif officially sign 2 years contract with Terengganu FC.

== International career ==
=== Youth ===
On 2 September 2017, Akif has been selected to represent Malaysia U19 at 2017 AFF U-18 Youth Championship in Yangon, Myanmar. On 4 September 2017, Nik Akif made his debut for Malaysia U19 in a 4–1 win over Laos. Nik Akif has scored one goal in a 1–1 draw over Thailand on 12 September 2017. On the final of Hassanal Bolkiah Trophy, Akif scored the winning goal for Malaysia defeating Myanmar 3–4.

On 31 October 2017, Akif Syahiran scored one goal in 1–4 win over Timor-Leste during the 2018 AFC U-19 Championship qualification at Paju Public Stadium.

On 23 November 2017, Akif Syahiran has been enlisted in Malaysia U22's 30-man provisional squad for the 2018 AFC U-23 Championship. On 10 January 2018, Akif made his first appearance for the Malaysia U23 came from the bench in the 88th minute in a 1–4 defeat to Iraq at Changshu Stadium.

== Career statistics ==
=== Club ===
As of match played 20 September 2025

Appearances and goals by club, season and competition
Club	Season	League			Cup		League Cup		Continental/Other		Total	
Club	Season	Division	Apps	Goals	Apps	Goals	Apps	Goals	Apps	Goals	Apps	Goals
Kelantan	2018	Malaysia Super League	18	2	2	0	4	2	–		24	4
Kelantan	2019	Malaysia Premier League	14	5	1	0	4	0	–		19	5
Kelantan	2020	Malaysia Premier League	11	2	0	0	1	0	–		12	2
Kelantan	Total		43	9	3	0	9	2	–		55	11
Terengganu	2021	Malaysia Super League	17	1	–		3	0	–		20	1
Terengganu	Total		17	1	–		3	0	–		20	1
Kelantan United (loan)	2022	Malaysia Premier League	8	0	0	0	1	0	–		9	0
Kelantan United (loan)	Total		8	0	0	0	1	0	–		9	0
Penang	2023	Malaysia Super League	23	2	3	0	2	0	1 (Note: Appearances in MFL Challenge Cup)	0	29	2
Penang	2024–25	Malaysia Super League	20	3	3	0	2	0	2 (Note: Appearances in MFL Challenge Cup)	0	27	3
Penang	Total		43	5	6	0	4	0	3	0	56	5
Immigration	2025–26	Malaysia Super League	2	0	0	0	0	0	–		2	0
Immigration	Total		2	0	0	0	0	0	–		2	0
Career Total			113	15	9	0	17	2	3	0	142	17

=== International ===
As of 16 October 2018

Appearances and goals by national team and year
National team	Year	Apps	Goals
Malaysia	2018	4	0
Malaysia	Total	4	0

==== Malaysia Under-19 ====
Nik Akif – goals for Malaysia U19
#	Date	Venue	Opponent	Score	Result	Competition
1.	12 September 2017	Aung San Stadium, Yangon, Myanmar	Thailand	1–0	1–1	2017 AFF U-18 Youth Championship
2.	31 October 2017	Paju Public Stadium, Paju, South Korea	Timor-Leste	2–0	3–1	2018 AFC U-19 Championship qualification
3.	14 July 2018	Gelora Delta Stadium, Indonesia	Myanmar	0–2	3-4	2018 AFF U-19 Youth Championship
4.	14 July 2018	Gelora Delta Stadium, Indonesia	Myanmar	3–4	3-4	2018 AFF U-19 Youth Championship
5.	6 October 2018	Doha, Qatar	Qatar	1–1	3–1	Friendly

== Honours ==
Malaysia U19

- AFF U-19 Youth Championship: 2018, runner-up: 2017
