= Norfiqrie Talib =

Malaysian footballer

Personal information
- Full name: Muhamad Norfiqrie bin Abdul Talib
- Date of birth: 31 January 1996 (age 30)
- Place of birth: Alor Setar, Kedah, Malaysia
- Height: 1.70 m (5 ft 7 in)
- Positions: Right-back; left-back

Team information
- Current team: Negeri Sembilan
- Number: 20

Youth career
- Kedah Darul Aman

Senior career*
Years	Team	Apps	(Gls)
2018–2020	Kedah Kedah Darul Aman	18	(0)
2021	MNY FC	0	(0)
2022	Respect FC	0	(0)
2023	PDRM	15	(0)
2024–	Negeri Sembilan	13	(0)
- * Club domestic league appearances and goals as of 12 May 2025

Muhamad Norfiqrie bin Abdul Talib (born 31 January 1996) is a Malaysian professional footballer who plays as a right-back and left-back for Malaysia Super League club Negeri Sembilan.

== Club career ==
=== Kedah ===
Norfiqrie has been promoted to the first team in 2018.

== Career statistics ==
=== Club ===
As of 26 September 2020

Appearances and goals by club, season and competition
Club	Season	League			Cup		League Cup		Continental		Total	
Club	Season	Division	Apps	Goals	Apps	Goals	Apps	Goals	Apps	Goals	Apps	Goals
Kedah	2018	Malaysia Super League	8	0	0	0	6	0	–		14	0
Kedah	2019	Malaysia Super League	5	0	0	0	1	0	–		6	0
Kedah	2020	Malaysia Super League	5	0	0	0	0	0	0	0	5	0
Kedah	Total		18	0	0	0	7	0	0	0	25	0
Career total			18	0	0	0	7	0	0	0	25	0

== Honours ==
=== Club ===
Kedah Darul Aman

- Malaysia FA Cup: 2019
