= Fayadh Zulkifli =

Malaysian footballer

Personal information
- Full name: Muhammad Fayadh bin Mohd Zulkifli Amin
- Date of birth: 13 September 1998 (age 28)
- Place of birth: Baling, Malaysia
- Height: 1.60 m (5 ft 3 in)
- Position: Winger

Team information
- Current team: Sabah
- Number: 21

Youth career
- 2015: Kedah Darul Aman U21

Senior career*
| Years | Team | Apps | (Gls) |
| 2015–2019 | Kedah | 12 | (6) |
| 2019–2024 | Kedah Darul Aman | 75 | (10) |
| 2025–2026 | Star City | 16 | (2) |

International career^{‡}
| 2021– | Malaysia | 3 | (0) |
- * Club domestic league appearances and goals ‡ National team caps and goals as of 23 March 2023

Muhammad Fayadh bin Mohd Zulkifli Amin (born 14 September 1998) is a Malaysian professional footballer who plays as a winger. He is part of the Malaysia national team.

== Career statistics ==
=== Club ===
As of 7 June 2023

Appearances and goals by club, season and competition
| Club | Season | League | | | Cup | | League Cup | | Continental/Others | | Total | |
| Club | Season | Division | Apps | Goals | Apps | Goals | Apps | Goals | Apps | Goals | Apps | Goals |
|---|---|---|---|---|---|---|---|---|---|---|---|---|
| Kedah Darul Aman | 2019 | Malaysia Super League | 13 | 1 | 4 | 0 | 11 | 2 | – | | 28 | 3 |
| Kedah Darul Aman | 2020 | Malaysia Super League | 5 | 1 | – | | 0 | 0 | 1 (Note: Appearances in AFC Champions League) | 0 | 6 | 1 |
| Kedah Darul Aman | 2021 | Malaysia Super League | 21 | 4 | – | | 6 | 1 | – | | 27 | 5 |
| Kedah Darul Aman | 2022 | Malaysia Super League | 22 | 4 | 2 | 2 | 0 | 0 | 4 (Note: Appearances in AFC Cup) | 4 | 28 | 10 |
| Kedah Darul Aman | 2023 | Malaysia Super League | 24 | 0 | 1 | 0 | 2 | 0 | – | | 27 | 0 |
| Kedah Darul Aman | Total | | 85 | 10 | 7 | 2 | 19 | 3 | 5 | 4 | 116 | 19 |

== Honours ==
Kedah Darul Aman

- Malaysia FA Cup: 2019
- Malaysia Cup runner-up: 2019
- Malaysia Super League runner-up: 2020, 2021
