= Rizal Ghazali =

Malaysian professional footballer

Personal information
- Full name: Mohd Rizal bin Mohd Ghazali
- Date of birth: 1 October 1992 (age 34)
- Place of birth: Baling, Kedah, Malaysia
- Height: 1.72 m (5 ft 7 1/2 in)
- Positions: Right-back; wing-back

Team information
- Current team: Star City
- Number: 15

Youth career
- 2010: Perlis U21

Senior career*
Years	Team	Apps	(Gls)
2011–2013	Perlis	20	(8)
2014–2021	Kedah Darul Aman	118	(1)
2022–2023	Sabah	40	(2)
2024–2025	Kedah Darul Aman	11	(1)
2025–	Star City	24	(0)

International career^{‡}
2016–2021	Malaysia	19	(0)
- * Club domestic league appearances and goals ‡ National team caps and goals as of 15 June 2021

Mohd Rizal bin Mohd Ghazali (born 1 October 1992), simply known as Rizal, is a Malaysian professional footballer who plays for the Malaysia Super League club Star City and the Malaysia national team as a right-back.

== Club career ==
=== Perlis ===
Rizal began his career with Perlis youth team in the President Cup. He was promoted to the senior team in 2011. Rizal spent three seasons with Perlis senior team before signed with Kedah for the 2014 season.

=== Kedah Darul Aman ===
On 17 October 2013, Rizal signed a contract with Kedah Darul Aman. At the beginning, Rizal played as a winger.

Rizal scored a goal in the 2016 Malaysia Cup final which ended 1–1 after extra time. Kedah won 6–5 in the shootout and clinched the Malaysia Cup.

== International career ==
Rizal made his first international appearance for Malaysia national team in a 0–0 draw friendly against Singapore on 7 October 2016.

Rizal was called up to the Malaysia squad for the 2020 AFF Championship.

== Career statistics ==
=== Club ===
As of match played 27 December 2024

FA Cup		Malaysia Cup		Asia		Total						
Season	Club	League	Apps	Goals	Apps	Goals	Apps	Goals	Apps	Goals	Apps	Goals
2011	Perlis	Malaysia Super League	15	5	0	0	0	0	–		15	5
2012	Perlis	Malaysia Premier League	5	3	0	0	0	0	–		5	3
2013	Perlis	Malaysia Premier League	0	0	0	0	0	0	–		0	0
Total			20	8	0	0	0	0	–		20	8
2014	Kedah Darul Aman	Malaysia Premier League	0	0	0	0	0	0	–		0	0
2015	Kedah Darul Aman	Malaysia Premier League	17	0	0	0	0	0	–		17	0
2016	Kedah Darul Aman	Malaysia Super League	18	0	4	0	11	1	–		33	1
2017	Kedah Darul Aman	Malaysia Super League	15	0	6	0	8	0	–		29	0
2018	Kedah Darul Aman	Malaysia Super League	20	0	2	0	1	0	–		23	0
2019	Kedah Darul Aman	Malaysia Super League	18	1	7	0	10	0	–		35	1
2020	Kedah Darul Aman	Malaysia Super League	10	0	0	0	1	0	2	0	13	0
2021	Kedah Darul Aman	Malaysia Super League	20	0	0	0	5	0	0	0	25	0
Total			118	1	19	0	36	1	2	0	175	2
2022	Sabah	Malaysia Super League	18	0	1	0	5	0	–		24	0
2023	Sabah	Malaysia Super League	23	2	2	0	2	1	–		27	3
Total			41	2	3	0	7	1	0	0	51	3
2024	Kedah Darul Aman	Malaysia Super League	9	1	2	0	0	0	-		11	1
Total			9	1	2	0	0	0	-	-	11	1
Career total			188	12	24	0	43	2	2	0	257	14

=== International ===
As of match played 15 June 2021

National team	Year	Apps	Goals
Malaysia	2016	5	0
Malaysia	2017	5	0
Malaysia	2018	1	0
Malaysia	2019	1	0
Malaysia	2021	1	0
Total		13	0

== Honours ==
=== Club ===
Kedah Darul Aman

- Malaysia Premier League: 2015
- Malaysian FA Cup: 2017, 2019
- Malaysia Cup: 2016
- Malaysia Charity Shield: 2017

=== Individual ===
- Man of the match Malaysia Cup final: 2016
- FAM Football Awards – Best defender: 2016
- Malaysia Super League team of the season: 2019
