= Farid Nezal =

Malaysian footballer

Personal information
- Full name: Muhammad Farid bin Nezal
- Date of birth: 16 November 1997 (age 28)
- Place of birth: Rembau, Negeri Sembilan, Malaysia
- Height: 1.78 m (5 ft 10 in)
- Position: Centre-back

Youth career
- 2012–2014: Akademi Bolasepak Yayasan N.S
- 2015–2016: Felda United U19
- 2017: Felda United U21

Senior career*
Years	Team	Apps	(Gls)
2018–2019	PKNP	9	(0)
2020	Police	6	(0)
2021–2022	UiTM	8	(0)
2022	Perak		
2023	Negeri Sembilan		
2024–2025	Melaka		
2025–2026	Immigration		
- * Club domestic league appearances and goals

Muhammad Farid bin Nezal (born 16 November 1997) is a Malaysian professional footballer who plays as a centre-back.

== Club career ==
He was officially announced as a new Negeri Sembilan FC player on January 17, 2023.
