= Endrick (footballer, born 1995) =

Footballer

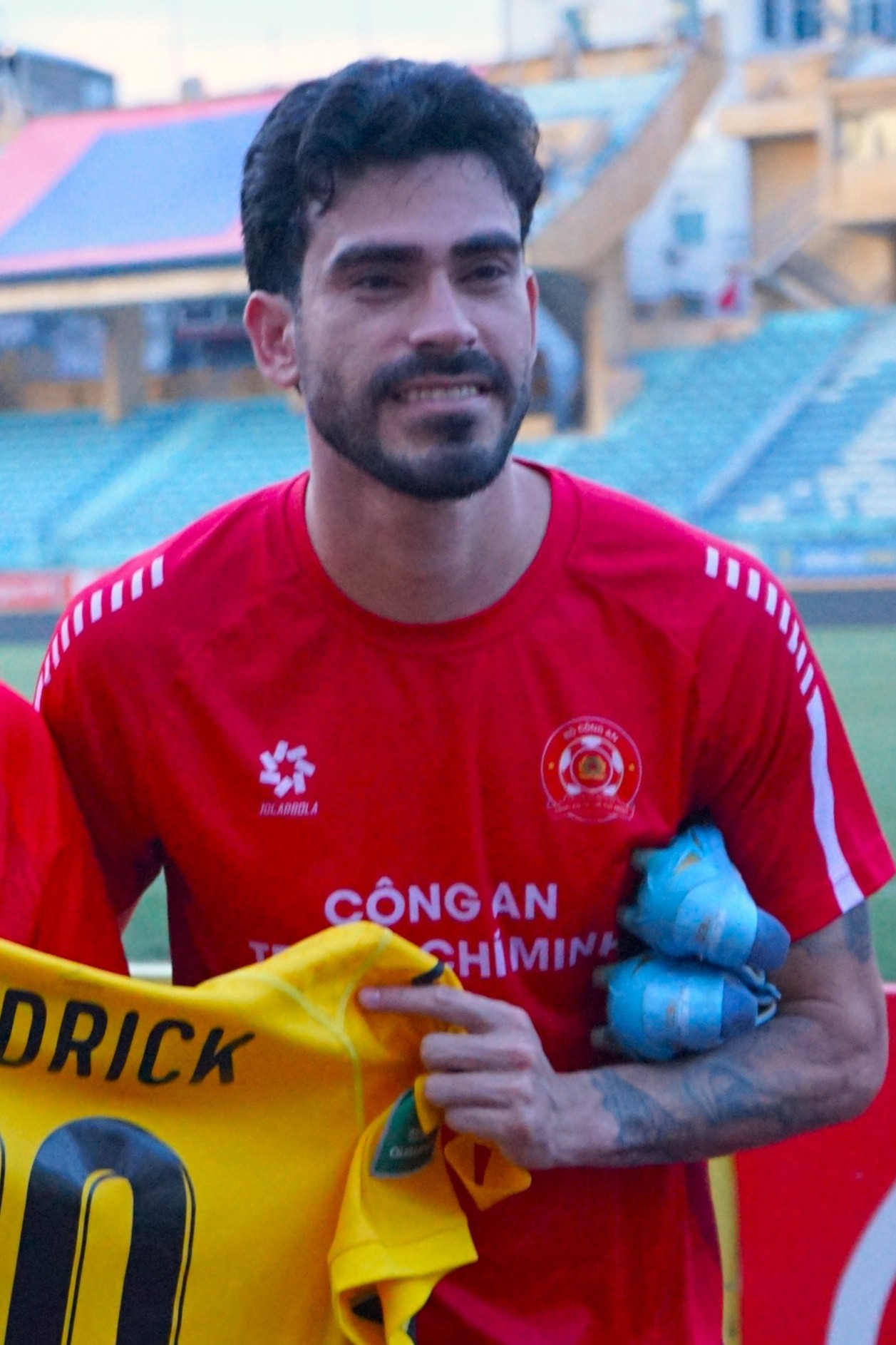
- Endrick with Cong An Ho Chi Minh City in 2026

Personal information
- Full name: Endrick dos Santos Parafita
- Date of birth: 7 March 1995 (age 31)
- Place of birth: Santana, Brazil
- Height: 1.82 m (6 ft 0 in)
- Position: Attacking midfielder

Team information
- Current team: Star City
- Number: 14

Senior career*
Years	Team	Apps	(Gls)
2014	Ypiranga	1	(0)
2015	Campinense	2	(0)
2015	Santa Rita de Cássia	4	(0)
2016–2017	Apollon Limassol	0	(0)
2016–2017	→ AEZ Zakakiou (loan)	14	(0)
2017	Botoșani	6	(0)
2018	Felcra	19	(1)
2019	Selangor	14	(4)
2020–2022	Penang	37	(5)
2023–2024	Johor Darul Ta'zim	27	(5)
2024–2025	→ Ho Chi Minh City (loan)	24	(2)
2025–2026	Cong An Ho Chi Minh City	16	(1)
2026–	Star City	0	(0)

International career^{‡}
2023–	Malaysia	30	(2)
Medal record
Men's football
Representing Malaysia
Merdeka Tournament
Runner-up	2023
Winner	2024
- * Club domestic league appearances and goals as of 21 July 2026 ‡ National team caps and goals as of 17 November 2026

Endrick dos Santos Parafita (born 7 March 1995), simply known as Endrick, is a professional footballer who plays as an attacking midfielder or a forward for Malaysia Super League club Star City. Born in Brazil, he plays for the Malaysia national team.

== Club career ==
=== Early career ===
Endrick began his career as a footballer with the Brazilian club Ypiranga in 2014.

=== Campinense Clube ===
In 2015, Endrick moved to another club in Brazil, Campinense.

=== Santa Rita ===
Later that same year in 2015, Endrick moved to the Angolan club Santa Rita de Cássia.

=== Apollon Limassol ===
On 8 August 2016, Endrick began his career in Europe by joining the Cypriot First Division club Apollon Limassol.

==== AEZ Zakakiou (loan) ====
On 9 August 2016, the day he moved to Apollon Limassol, Endrick was loaned out to AEZ Zakakiou until the end of the 2016–17 season. He made his debut for the club on 21 August in a 3–1 win over Ethnikos Achnas.

=== Botoșani ===
On 23 January 2017, Endrick later moved to the Romanian club Botoșani. He made his debut on 20 February in a 1–0 loss to Dinamo București.

=== Felcra ===
On 9 January 2018, Endrick began his career in Asia with a move to the Malaysian football club Felcra, where he helped the club to become the runners-up in the 2018 Malaysia Premier League.

=== Selangor ===
In January 2019, Endrick joined Malaysia Super League club, Selangor. He made his debut in a 1–1 draw to Felda United on 3 February. Endrick scored his first goal for the club in a 4–2 loss to Johor Darul Ta'zim on 1 March.

=== Penang ===
On 5 March 2020, Endrick moved to Malaysia Premier League club Penang. He helped them win the 2020 Malaysia Premier League, thus securing their promotion to the 2021 Malaysian Super League.

=== Johor Darul Ta'zim ===
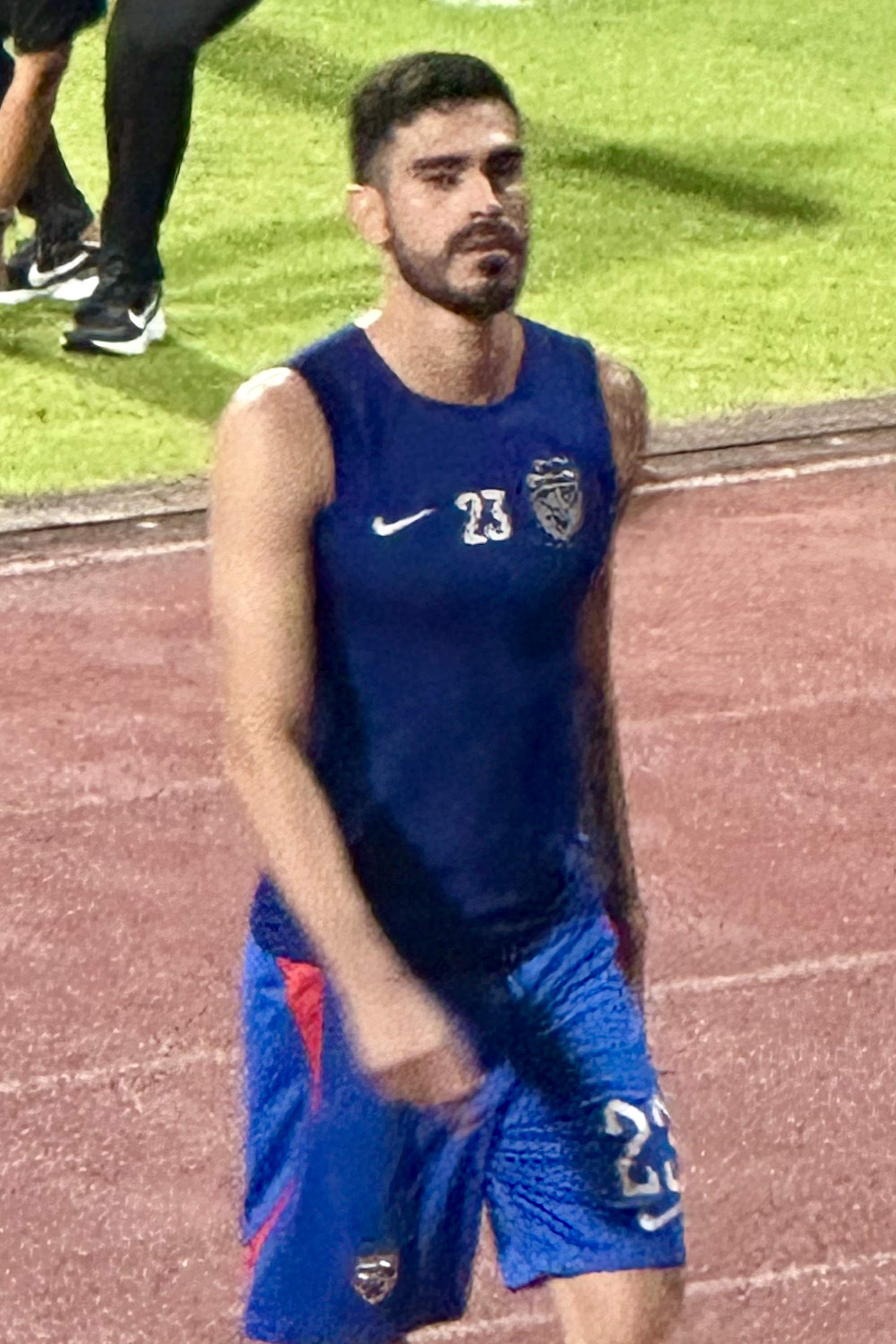
Endrick with Johor Darul Ta'zim in 2024.

On 5 January 2023, Endrick signed for Johor Darul Ta'zim as part of their campaign in the upcoming 2023 Malaysia Super League and 2023-24 AFC Champions League campaign. As he had been playing in Malaysia for the last 5 years, he is registered as a local player after acquiring Malaysian citizenship. Endrick scored on his debut in a 3–0 win against Kuala Lumpur City on 1 March. He went on to score in three consecutive league matches thereafter. On 19 September, he made his AFC Champions League debut in a 1–0 loss to Japanese club Kawasaki Frontale. Endrick managed to score his first AFC Champions League goal in a 4–1 win over Thailand club BG Pathum United on 12 December.

==== Cong An Ho Chi Minh City (loan) ====
On 11 August 2024, Endrick was loaned to V.League 1 side Ho Chi Minh City until the end of the 2024–25 season. On 22 September, he scored and assisted a goal in a 2–1 win over Quy Nhon Binh Dinh.

=== Cong An Ho Chi Minh City ===
On 8 August 2025, Endrick signed a long-term contract with Cong An Ho Chi Minh City. In the 2025–26 V.League 1, Cong An Ho Chi Minh finished only 5th. After this result, CAHCM announced the departure of Endrick, together with Peter Makrillos, Matheus Felipe, and Raphael Utzig.

=== Star City ===
On 19 July 2026, Endrick left Vietnam to join Malaysia Super League club Star City, formerly known as Immigration FC. He joined seven other local players signed by the club during the same transfer window.

== International career ==
As Endrick was born in Brazil before acquiring Malaysian citizenship, Endrick is eligible to play for Brazil. After playing in Malaysia for the last 6 years, Endrick acquired Malaysian citizenship in early 2023, thus allowing him to represent Malaysia. On 15 March 2023, he received his first national call-up to the Malaysia national team for the centralised training camp beginning on 18 March ahead of the international friendlies against Turkmenistan and Hong Kong. He made his debut on 28 March against Turkmenistan at the Sultan Ibrahim Stadium. He was also called up to play at the 2023 Merdeka Tournament in October 2023.

Endrick was part of the Malaysia squad at the 2023 AFC Asian Cup in Qatar and also the 2024 ASEAN Championship.

He scored his first international goal on 31 March 2026 against Vietnam during the 2027 AFC Asian Cup qualification at the Thiên Trường Stadium.

=== Interntional goals ===
List of international goals scored by Endrick
No.	Date	Venue	Opponent	Score	Result	Competition
1	31 March 2026	Thiên Trường Stadium, Ninh Bình, Vietnam	Vietnam	1–3	1–3	2027 AFC Asian Cup qualification
2	28 July 2026	Kuala Lumpur Stadium, Kuala Lumpur, Malaysia	Laos	2–0	4–0	2026 ASEAN Championship

== Style of play ==
Endrick is characterised as a central midfielder who frequently adopts an aggressive and attack-oriented role. He has been deployed as a playmaker and is noted for his forward movement and positive approach on the field. His experience in the Vietnamese top division has also been highlighted as a contributing factor to his suitability for international selection.

== Honours ==
=== Club ===
Felcra

- Malaysia Premier League runner-up: 2018

Penang

- Malaysia Premier League: 2020

Johor Darul Ta'zim

- Malaysia Super League: 2023
- Malaysia FA Cup: 2023
- Malaysia Cup: 2023
- Malaysia Charity Shield: 2023

Cong An Ho Chi Minh City

- Vietnamese Cup: 2025–26

=== International ===
==== Malaysia ====
- Merdeka Tournament: 2024; runner-up 2023
