= Keron Ornchaiyaphum =

Thai footballer

Personal information
- Full name: Keron Ornchaiyaphum
- Date of birth: 21 November 1999 (age 26)
- Place of birth: Samut Sakhon, Thailand
- Height: 1.83 m (6 ft 0 in)
- Position: Left back

Youth career
- 2012–2017: Debsirin School

Senior career*
Years	Team	Apps	(Gls)
2017–2023	Buriram United	0	(0)
2020	→ Rajpracha (loan)	2	(0)
2020–2022	→ Nonthaburi United (loan)	48	(1)
2023	→ Trat (loan)	2	(0)
2023	Maraleina	8	(1)
2024–2025	PT Prachuap	16	(2)
2024	→ Phrae United (loan)	5	(0)
2025–2026	Immigration		

International career
2017–2018	Thailand U19	4	(0)
- * Club domestic league appearances and goals as of July 2026

Keron Ornchaiyaphum (Thai: คีรอน อ้อนชัยภูมิ, born 21 November 1999) is a Thai professional footballer who plays as a left back.

== Club career ==
On 31 August 2025, Keron moved to Malaysia Super League club and signed with Immigration.

== Personal life ==
Keron was named after Kieron Dyer because his father is a fan of the player.

== Honours ==
=== Buriram United ===
- Thai League 1: 2018
