= João Pedro (footballer, born May 2000) =

Brazilian footballer

Personal information
- Full name: João Pedro Boeira Duarte
- Date of birth: 30 May 2000 (age 26)
- Place of birth: Pelotas, Brazil
- Height: 1.86 m (6 ft 1 in)
- Position: Striker

Youth career
- 2015–2018: Pelotas

Senior career*
Years	Team	Apps	(Gls)
2018	Farroupilha		
2018	Lajeadense		
2019	Samambaia		
2020	Chapadinha	5	(0)
2021–2022	Juventude-MA		
2022	Esportivo	16	(4)
2022	Pelotas	8	(3)
2023	Avenida	8	(0)
2023	Santa Cruz-RS	15	(3)
2023	Marcílio Dias		
2024	Guarany de Bagé		
2024	The Cong-Viettel	12	(2)
2024–2025	Sabah	9	(7)
2025	→ Ho Chi Minh City (loan)	10	(3)
2025–2026	Immigration	11	(4)
- * Club domestic league appearances and goals as of July 2026

João Pedro Boeira Duarte (born 30 May 2000) is a Brazilian professional footballer who plays as a striker.

== Early life ==
João Pedro was born in Pelotas, Brazil. He began his football career at a young age, joining the youth academy of Pelotas.

== Club career ==
In March 2024, João Pedro signed his first professional contract with The Cong-Viettel, a club competing in the Vietnamese V.League 1. During his time with the club, he made 12 appearances and scored 2 goals, and was released shortly after.

In August 2024, João Pedro joined Sabah on a nine-month contract until April 2025, replacing Ramon Machado. His signing was aimed at strengthening Sabah's attacking options in the Malaysia Super League. In the first half of the season, he netted 7 goals after 9 appearances, being among the top goalscorers of the league.

In February 2025, João Pedro returned to Vietnam, being loaned to Ho Chi Minh City.
