= Azfar Fikri =

Malaysian footballer (born 2000)

Personal information
- Full name: Muhammad Nur Azfar bin Fikri Azhar
- Date of birth: 5 February 2000 (age 26)
- Place of birth: Kuala Lumpur, Malaysia
- Height: 1.69 m (5 ft 7 in)
- Position: Attacking midfielder

Team information
- Current team: Immigration
- Number: 6

Youth career
- 2021–2023: Terengganu II

Senior career*
Years	Team	Apps	(Gls)
2021–2023	Terengganu II	44	(3)
2023	Terengganu	1	(0)
2023–2025	Perak	22	(2)
2025–	Immigration	4	(0)

International career^{‡}
2021–2022	Malaysia U23	12	(3)
- * Club domestic league appearances and goals as of 23:00, 20 September 2025 (UTC) ‡ National team caps and goals as of 18:05, 23 March 2025 (UTC)

Muhammad Nur Azfar bin Fikri Azhar (born 5 February 2000) is a Malaysian professional footballer who plays as an attacking midfielder for Malaysia Super League club Immigration.

== Club career ==
=== Perak ===
On 23 December 2023, Azfar signed a contract with Malaysia Super League club, Perak.

== International career ==
Azfar was part of the 2021 SEA Games squad.
