= Star City F.C. =

Malaysian football club

Star City
- Full name: Star City Football Club
- Nicknames: The Pride of the North; The Northern Stars
- Short name: STR
- Founded: 2015; 11 years ago, as Immigration; 1 July 2026; 3 months ago, as Star City
- Ground: Tuanku Syed Putra Stadium
- Capacity: 20,000
- Owner: IFC Corporation Sdn. Bhd.
- President: Muhammad Syahmi bin Jaafar
- Head coach: Mehmet Duraković
- League: Malaysia Super League
- 2025–26: Malaysia Super League, 6th of 13
- Website: starcityfc.com
Home colours	Away colours

Star City Football Club, formerly known as Immigration Football Club, is a professional football club owned by the IFC Corporation Sdn Bhd. The club is based in Kangar, Perlis but was founded initially in Bangi. They are currently playing in the Malaysia Super League, the top flight league in the country. The club move to Kangar reflected the club's establishment as a representative of Perlis in Malaysian football.

== History ==
=== Foundation and early competitions (2015–2019) ===
The club was founded by the Immigration Department of Malaysia in 2015 in Semenyih, and participated in several competitions in the Klang Valley as Immigration Football Club. Immigration has also been involved in the KLFA Super League. The club gradually established itself in the regional football scene and finished as runners-up in the 2019 Kuala Lumpur League, earning promotion to the Malaysia M3 League.

=== Entry into national competitions (2020–2025) ===
On 23 February 2020, Immigration competed in the 2020 Malaysia FA Cup for the first time and won the 1st round match by 2–0 against Staroba. The remaining season was suspended due to the COVID-19 pandemic.

The club competed in the 2023 Malaysia FA Cup and on 25 March, the club recorded a 1–0 victory over BRM in the opening round before being eliminated by Kuala Lumpur City, losing 2–0 in the next round.

In February 2025, Immigration ended as the 2024–25 Malaysia A1 Semi-Pro League runners-up, gaining promotion to the Malaysia Super League for the first time. During the 2025 Malaysia FA Cup round of 16 first leg fixture against Terengganu, Immigration won after João Pedro scored a stoppage time winner.

=== Rebranding as Star City (2026–present) ===
The Immigration football club has officially rebranded as Star City Football Club, effective from 1 July 2026 onwards. This major rebranding came as the club ramps up preparations for the 2026–27 Malaysia Super League season.

== Team image ==
=== Crest and colours ===
2015–2020

2021–2025

== Stadium ==
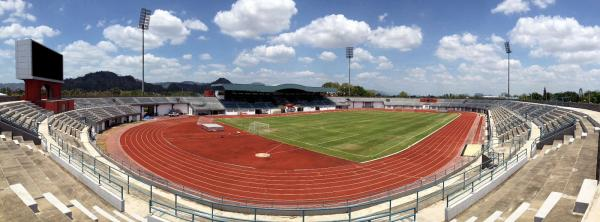
Tuanku Syed Putra Stadium

The club plays its home matches at Tuanku Syed Putra Stadium, located in Kangar, Perlis. The multi-purpose stadium was opened in 1995 and has a seating capacity of approximately 20,000 spectators. Formerly known as Stadium Utama or State Main Stadium, it was constructed to provide a modern sporting venue for the state and was used during the 1997 FIFA World Youth Championship. The stadium serves as the home ground for football clubs representing Perlis and hosts domestic league and cup matches.

Stadium	Period
UKM Bangi Stadium, Bangi	2015–2019
USIM Stadium, Nilai	2020–2022
UPM Stadium, Serdang	2022–2023
Penang State Stadium, Batu Kawan	2025–2026
Tuanku Syed Putra Stadium, Kangar	2026–present

== Kit manufacturers and shirt sponsors ==
Season	Manufacturer	Sponsor
2020	(Malaysia) Sky Hawk	(Malaysia) NSK Trade City
2022	(Malaysia) Zush	(Malaysia) redONE
2023	(Malaysia) Let's Play Performance	(Malaysia) redONE (Malaysia) MBSB Bank
2024–2025	(Malaysia) Let's Play Performance	(Malaysia) redONE (Malaysia) MBSB Bank (Malaysia) Zetrix
2025–2026	(Malaysia) al-Ikhsan Sport	(Malaysia) Weststar
2026–present	(Malaysia) Sportink	(Malaysia) AirAsia

== Players ==
=== First-team squad ===
As of 24 August 2026

Note: Flags indicate national team as defined under FIFA eligibility rules; some limited exceptions apply. Players may hold more than one non-FIFA nationality.

No.	Pos.	Nation	Player
2	DF	PHI	Noah Leddel
3	DF	MAS	Akmal Zahir
4	DF	MAS	Harith Samsuri
5	MF	BRA	Pedro Santos Filho
6	MF	MAS	Azfar Fikri
7	MF	BHR	Moses Atede
8	FW	MAS	T. Saravanan
10	FW	BRA	Pedro Henrique
12	DF	MAS	Aiman Yusni
13	DF	MAS	Loqman Hakim
14	MF	MAS	Endrick
15	DF	MAS	Rizal Ghazali (captain)
16	FW	BRA	Ramon Machado
17	DF	BRA	Rafael Vitor

No.	Pos.	Nation	Player
18	MF	MAS	Syafik Ismail
19	MF	MAS	Mior Dani
20	GK	MAS	Shaiful Wazizi Mohammad
22	MF	MAS	Engku Nur Shakir
23	GK	MAS	Hafizul Hakim
25	DF	MAS	Anwar Ibrahim
26	FW	MAS	Syahmi Zamri
27	MF	MAS	Fakhri Azri
29	MF	SGP	Zulfahmi Arifin
30	DF	MAS	Heshamudin Ahmad
33	MF	MAS	Nik Akif
34	MF	MAS	Amirul Aiman
43	GK	MAS	Farhan Abdul Majid
97	FW	BRA	Douglas Oliveira

== Management and staff ==
As of August 2026

=== Management ===
Period	President
2015–2020	(Malaysia) Dato' Zulfikar Ahmad
2021–present	(Malaysia) Syahmi Jaafar

=== Technical staff ===
Position	Name
Chief executive officer	(Malaysia) Datuk Syed Mahadi Syed Hassan
Technical director	(Malaysia) Ahmad Shahrul Azhar
Head coach	(Australia) Mehmet Duraković
Assistant coach	(Brazil) Rhostann Almeida
Goalkeeping coach	(Malaysia) Abdul Hadi Abdul Hamid
Fitness coach	(Brazil) Rafael de Toledo Carvalho
Team doctor	(Malaysia) Jasminder Singh Kulwant Singh
Team analyst	(Malaysia) Anwar Azhari
Physio	(Malaysia) Syafi Abdul Rahman
Masseur	(Malaysia) Megat Ahmad Loutfie
Kitman	(Malaysia) Mohd Noorhisham Mis (Malaysia) Nur Hazmie Hairan
Media officer	(Malaysia) Tajul Ariffin Kamal Baharin

== Honours ==
=== Domestic competitions ===
League

- Division 3/M3 League/A1 League
  - Champions (1): 2023
  - Runners-up (1): 2024–25
  - Third place (1) : 2022
- Division 5/KLFA Super League/A3 Community League
  - Runners-up (1): 2019

== Notable players ==
As of 2026–27 season.

=== International capped players ===
AFC/OFC.: (Bahrain) Moses Atede; (Myanmar) Thiha Zaw; (Philippines) Noah Leddel; (Singapore) Zulfahmi Arifin; (Thailand) Keron Ornchaiyaphum	CAF.: (Burkina Faso) Elvis Kamsoba; (Liberia) Francis Doe; (Tanzania) Said Khamis	UEFA.: –NIL–	CONMEBOL/ CONCACAF.: –NIL

== Managerial history ==
Coach	Years	Honours
(Malaysia) Khalid A. Rashid	2019–2022	
(Malaysia) Hamizar Hamdan	2022	2022 Malaysia M3 League third place
(Malaysia) Mat Zan Mat Aris	2022–2025	2023 Malaysia M3 League winner 2024–25 Malaysia A1 Semi-Pro League runner-up
(Malaysia) Yusri Che Lah	2025	
(Australia) Mehmet Duraković	2026–present	

== Season by season record ==
Season	Division	Position	Malaysia Cup	Malaysian FA Cup	Malaysian Charity Shield	Regional	Top scorer (all competitions)
2015	KLFA Division 3		DNQ	DNQ	–	–	
2015–16	KLFA Division 2		DNQ	DNQ	–	–	
2016–17	KLFA Super League		DNQ	DNQ	–	–	
2017–18	KLFA Super League	9th place	DNQ	DNQ	–	–	
2019	KLFA Super League	2nd	DNQ	DNQ	–	–	
2020^{1}	M3 League	Season abandoned	DNQ	Round 2	–	–	
2021	M3 League	Not held due to COVID-19 pandemic					
2022	M3 League	3rd	DNQ	Preliminary round	–	–	(Malaysia) Firdaus Azizul (22)
2023	M3 League	1st	DNQ	Second round	–	–	(Malaysia) Azim Rahim (25)
2024–25	A1 League	2nd	DNQ	DNQ	–	–	(Nigeria) Thankgod Michael (21)
2025–26	Super League	6th	Round of 16	Round of 16	–	–	(Colombia) Wilmar Jordán (11)

^12020 season cancelled due to the COVID-19 pandemic, no promotion or league title was awarded

Champions	Runners-up	Third place	Promoted	Relegated

== See also ==
- Immigration FC II
- Stadium Merdeka
