= 2019 Petaling Jaya City FC season =

Petaling Jaya City
2019 season
- Owner: QI Group
- Chairman: Vijay Eswaran
- Head coach: Devan E. Kuppusamy
- Stadium: MBPJ Stadium
- Malaysia Super League: 8th
- Malaysia FA Cup: Third round
- Malaysia Cup: Group stage
- Top goalscorer: League: Pedro Henrique; Washington Brandão (4 goals); All: Pedro Henrique (5 goals)
| Home colours | Away colours |

The 2019 season was Petaling Jaya City's 1st season of competitive football, the top division of Malaysian football and in the Malaysia Super League since rebranded in 2019. The season covers the period from 1 February 2019 to 21 July 2019.

== Players ==
| No. | Pos. | Player | Nationality | Date of birth (age) | Signed from | Since |
|---|---|---|---|---|---|---|
| 1 | GK | Muhaimin Mohamad | (Malaysia) | 14 November 1991 (age 33) | MOF | 2018 |
| 2 | DF | Annas Rahmat | (Malaysia) | 7 November 1994 (age 31) | PKNS | 2019 |
| 3 | DF | Subramaniam Sooryapparad | (Malaysia) | 31 August 1985 (age 40) | Kelantan | 2018 |
| 5 | MF | Elizeu | (Brazil) | 28 May 1989 (age 36) | Suphanburi | 2018 |
| 6 | DF | Ganiesh Gunasegaran | (Malaysia) | 26 June 1995 (age 30) | PKNP | 2018 |
| 7 | MF | Yoges Muniandy | (Malaysia) | 13 November 1988 (age 36) | | 2016 |
| 8 | MF | Bae Beom-geun | (South Korea) | 4 March 1993 (age 32) | ATM | 2018 |
| 9 | FW | Washington Brandão | (Brazil) | 18 August 1990 (age 35) | Persela Lamongan | 2019 |
| 10 | FW | Safee Sali | (Malaysia) | 29 January 1984 (age 41) | Perlis | 2019 |
| 11 | DF | Aizulridzwan Razali | (Malaysia) | 19 November 1986 (age 38) | Negeri Sembilan | 2019 |
| 12 | MF | Barathkumar Ramaloo | (Malaysia) | 23 April 1992 (age 33) | Petaling Jaya Rangers | 2018 |
| 13 | MF | Thivandran Karnan | (Malaysia) | 8 March 1999 (age 26) | Penang | 2019 |
| 14 | FW | Yugan Poobathy | (Malaysia) | 30 November 1997 (age 27) | Youth team | 2019 |
| 15 | MF | Youwarasan Maniom | (Malaysia) | 15 February 1993 (age 32) | | 2015 |
| 16 | DF | Zamri Pin Ramli | (Malaysia) | 24 April 1991 (age 34) | Young Fighters | 2016 |
| 17 | DF | Rajes Perumal | (Malaysia) | 21 June 1985 (age 40) | PKNS | 2018 |
| 18 | MF | Sivakumar Munusamy | (Malaysia) | 6 March 1984 (age 41) | PKNS | 2019 |
| 19 | FW | Marcus Mah Yung Jian | (Malaysia) | | DBKL | 2019 |
| 21 | GK | Hairol Fazreen | (Malaysia) | 29 February 1988 (age 37) | PKNP | 2018 |
| 22 | GK | Kalamullah Al-Hafiz | (Malaysia) | 30 July 1995 (age 30) | Felda United | 2019 |
| 23 | MF | Veenod Subramaniam | (Malaysia) | 31 March 1988 (age 37) | Melaka United | 2019 |
| 24 | DF | Tinagaran Baskeran | (Malaysia) | 2 April 1991 (age 34) | Penang | 2015 |
| 27 | FW | A. Thamil Arasu | (Malaysia) | 4 July 1991 (age 34) | Petaling Jaya Rangers | 2019 |
| 28 | DF | Nasriq Baharom | (Malaysia) | 8 February 1987 (age 38) | Unattached | 2019 |
| 29 | FW | Pedro Henrique | (Timor-Leste) | 17 January 1992 (age 33) | Samut Sakhon | 2019 |
| 30 | MF | Serginho | (Brazil) | 27 April 1988 (age 37) | Bangu | 2019 |
| – | FW | Giancarlo | (Brazil) | 14 January 1990 (age 35) | Concórdia | 2019 |

== Transfers ==
=== In ===
1st leg

| Date | Pos. | Name | From | Ref. |
|---|---|---|---|---|
| 1 January 2019 | GK | (Malaysia) Kalamullah Al-Hafiz | (Malaysia) Felda United | |
| 1 January 2019 | DF | (Malaysia) Annas Rahmat | (Malaysia) PKNS | |
| 1 January 2019 | MF | (Malaysia) Thivandran Karnan | (Malaysia) Penang | |
| 1 January 2019 | MF | (Malaysia) Veenod Subramaniam | (Malaysia) Melaka United | |
| 1 January 2019 | MF | (Malaysia) Sivakumar Munusamy | (Malaysia) PKNS | |
| 1 January 2019 | FW | (Malaysia) Marcus Mah Yung Jian | (Malaysia) DBKL | |
| 1 January 2019 | FW | (Malaysia) Yugan Poobathy | Youth team | |
| 1 January 2019 | FW | (Malaysia) A. Thamil Arasu | (Malaysia) Petaling Jaya Rangers | |
| 7 January 2019 | DF | (Malaysia) Aizulridzwan Razali | (Malaysia) Negeri Sembilan | |
| 20 January 2019 | FW | (Brazil) Pedro Henrique | (South Korea) Daejeon Citizen | |
| 23 January 2019 | DF | (Philippines) Joshua Grommen | (Philippines) Davao Aguilas | |
| 30 January 2019 | FW | (Brazil) Giancarlo | (Brazil) Concórdia | |
| 20 February 2019 | FW | (Malaysia) Safee Sali | (Malaysia) Perlis | |
| 20 February 2019 | MF | (Brazil) Serginho | (Brazil) Bangu | |

2nd leg

| Date | Pos. | Name | From | Ref. |
|---|---|---|---|---|
| 8 May 2019 | FW | (Brazil) Washington Brandão | (Indonesia) Persela Lamongan | |
| 8 May 2019 | FW | (Timor-Leste) Pedro Henrique | (Thailand) Samut Sakhon | |
| 8 May 2019 | DF | (Malaysia) Nasriq Baharom | Unattached | |

=== Out ===
1st leg

| Date | Pos. | Name | To | Ref. |
|---|---|---|---|---|
| 30 November 2018 | FW | (France) L´Imam Seydi | (Malaysia) Kelantan | |
| 30 November 2018 | FW | (Malaysia) Danasehar Ramachandran | Released | |
| 30 November 2018 | MF | (Malaysia) Thinaadkaran Mutiah | Released | |
| 30 November 2018 | MF | (Malaysia) Tamilselvan Sankupillai | Released | |
| 30 November 2018 | MF | (Malaysia) Mahathevan Gengatharan | Released | |
| 30 November 2018 | MF | (Malaysia) S. Dhaya Naidu | Released | |
| 30 November 2018 | FW | (Malaysia) J. Satrunan Pillai | Released | |
| 30 November 2018 | MF | (Malaysia) Mugenthirran Ganesan | (Malaysia) PKNP | |
| 30 November 2018 | FW | (Malaysia) Wan Mohd Syukri | (Malaysia) Melaka United | |
| 6 December 2018 | FW | (Liberia) Kpah Sherman | (Malaysia) PKNS | |

2nd leg

| Date | Pos. | Name | To | Ref. |
|---|---|---|---|---|
| 8 May 2019 | DF | (Philippines) Joshua Grommen | Released | |
| 8 May 2019 | FW | (Brazil) Pedro Henrique | Released | |

=== Loans out ===
1st leg

| Date from | Date to | Pos. | Name | To | Ref. |
|---|---|---|---|---|---|
| 20 February 2019 | End of season | FW | (Brazil) Giancarlo | (Malaysia) PKNP | |

2nd leg

| Date from | Date to | Pos. | Name | To | Ref. |
|---|---|---|---|---|---|
| 15 May 2019 | End of season | DF | (Malaysia) Yoges Muniandy | (Malaysia) Penang | |

== Competitions ==
=== Malaysia Super League ===
==== League table ====
| Pos | Team | Pld | W | D | L | GF | GA | GD | Pts | Qualification or relegation |
|---|---|---|---|---|---|---|---|---|---|---|
| 6 | Melaka United | 22 | 9 | 6 | 7 | 34 | 30 | +4 | 33 | |
| 7 | Terengganu | 22 | 7 | 9 | 6 | 35 | 37 | −2 | 30 | |
| 8 | Petaling Jaya City | 22 | 8 | 2 | 12 | 22 | 29 | −7 | 26 | |
| 9 | PKNS (Note: PKNS F.C. relegated after withdrawing license to complete for the 2020 Malaysia Premier League season as they become feeder club to Selangor FA.) (R) | 22 | 5 | 6 | 11 | 37 | 38 | −1 | 21 | Relegation to Malaysia Premier League |
| 10 | Felda United | 22 | 4 | 7 | 11 | 27 | 43 | −16 | 19 | |

Source: MFL
Rules for classification: 1) Points; 2) Goal difference; 3) Number of goals scored.
(R) Relegated

==== Results by matchday ====
| Matchday | 1 | 2 | 3 | 4 | 5 | 6 | 7 | 8 | 9 | 10 | 11 | 12 | 13 | 14 | 15 | 16 | 17 | 18 | 19 | 20 | 21 | 22 |
|---|---|---|---|---|---|---|---|---|---|---|---|---|---|---|---|---|---|---|---|---|---|---|
| Ground | A | H | A | H | A | A | H | A | H | A | H | H | A | H | A | H | H | A | H | A | A | H |
| Result | L | D | W | L | L | L | W | D | L | L | L | W | W | W | L | L | W | L | L | L | W | W |
| Position | 9 | 7 | 6 | 7 | 8 | 10 | 9 | 9 | 10 | 10 | 10 | 10 | 9 | 7 | 9 | 9 | 8 | 9 | 9 | 9 | 8 | 8 |

Updated to match(es) played on 21 July 2019. Source: MFL
A = Away; H = Home; W = Win; D = Draw; L = Loss

==== Matches ====
The Malaysian Football League (MFL) announced the fixtures for the 2019 season on 22 December 2018.

| 2 February 2019 1 | Melaka United | 2–1 | Petaling Jaya City | Krubong |
| 21:00 UTC+8 | Marković (yellow card) 12'; Krasniqi 36'; Casagrande 44'; Ridzuwan (yellow card) 67' | Report | Satish (yellow card) 35'; Barathkumar 58' | Stadium: Hang Jebat Stadium; Referee: Mohd Fairuzi Mat Desa |

| 9 February 2019 2 | Petaling Jaya City | 1–1 | Selangor | Petaling Jaya |
| 21:00 UTC+8 | Barathkumar (yellow card) 23'; Tinagaran (yellow card) 36'; Pedro Henrique (yellow card) 70', (goal) 80' (pen.); Ganiesh (yellow card) 90+5' | Report | Nguyễn (yellow card) 50'; Rufino Segovia 90' | Stadium: Petaling Jaya City Council Stadium; Referee: Suhaimi Sukri |

| 16 February 2019 3 | PKNP | 2–3 | Petaling Jaya City | Manjung |
| 21:00 UTC+8 | Yero 29'; Hafiz 52'; Fadhil (yellow card) 55'; Khozaimi (yellow card) 90+4'; Ezanie (yellow card) 90+5' | Report | Grommen (yellow card) 35'; Pedro Henrique 45+2'; Bae Beom-geun (yellow card) 56'; Rajesh (yellow card) 66'; Giancarlo 74'; Barathkumar 82' | Stadium: Manjung Municipal Council Stadium; Referee: Zohri Tajuddin |

| 22 February 2019 4 | Petaling Jaya City | 0–2 | Kedah | Petaling Jaya |
| 21:00 UTC+8 | Bae Beom-geun (yellow card) 33'; Elizeu (yellow card) 45'; Tinagaran (yellow card) 62' | Report | Syahrul 7'; Fernando 41'; Zaquan (yellow card) 67'; Hidhir (yellow card) 79' | Stadium: Petaling Jaya City Council Stadium; Referee: Wan Mohamad Tarmizi |

| 2 March 2019 5 | Felda United | 1–0 | Petaling Jaya City | Jengka |
| 21:00 UTC+8 | Ikeda 30' (pen.) | Report | Serginho (yellow card) 11'; Thivandran (yellow card) 63' | Stadium: Tun Abdul Razak Stadium; Referee: Khirulazuan Kidam |

| 9 March 2019 6 | Perak | 1–0 | Petaling Jaya City | Ipoh |
| 21:00 UTC+8 | Wander Luiz 39' (pen.), (yellow card) 62'; Firdaus (yellow card) 62'; Kenny (yellow card) 80' | Report | Barathkumar (yellow card) 11'; Rajesh (yellow card) 19'; Safee (yellow card) 22'; Pedro Henrique (yellow card) 80' | Stadium: Perak Stadium; Referee: Nazmi Nasaruddin |

| 30 March 2019 7 | Petaling Jaya City | 1–0 | PKNS | Petaling Jaya |
| 21:00 UTC+8 | Aizulridzwan 59' | Report | Qayyum (yellow card) 85' | Stadium: Petaling Jaya City Council Stadium; Referee: Fitri Maskon |

| 7 April 2019 8 | Pahang | 1–1 | Petaling Jaya City | Kuantan |
| 21:00 UTC+8 | Zé Eduardo 49'; Muslim (yellow card) 52'; Nwakaeme (yellow card) 58'; Goulon (yellow card) 90+1'; Zaharulnizam (yellow card) 90+4' | Report | Safee 49'; Veenod (yellow card) 38'; Muhaimin (yellow card) 60' | Stadium: Darul Makmur Stadium; Referee: Suhaimi Mat Hassan |

| 13 April 2019 9 | Petaling Jaya City | 0–1 | Johor Darul Ta'zim | Petaling Jaya |
| 21:00 UTC+8 | Tinagaran (yellow card) 49'; Grommen (yellow card) 64' | Report | Afiq (yellow card) 21'; Syafiq 28'; Maurício (yellow card) 60'; Hariss (yellow card) 82' | Stadium: Petaling Jaya City Council Stadium; Referee: Razlan Joffri Ali |

| 20 April 2019 10 | Kuala Lumpur | 1–0 | Petaling Jaya City | Bandar Tun Razak |
| 21:00 UTC+8 | Ashri 50'; Fitri (yellow card) 79'; Guilherme (yellow card) 86' | Report | | Stadium: Kuala Lumpur Stadium; Referee: Mohd Zohri Tajuddin |

| 27 April 2019 11 | Petaling Jaya City | 1–2 | Terengganu | Petaling Jaya |
| 21:00 UTC+8 | Rajesh 36'; Barathkumar (yellow card) 66' | Report | Thierry (yellow card) 39'; Tinagaran 67' (o.g.); Tchétché 79'; Nasrullah (yellow card) 90+4' | Stadium: Petaling Jaya City Council Stadium; Referee: Mohd Amirul Izwan Yaacob |

| 4 May 2019 12 | Petaling Jaya City | 2–0 | Pahang | Petaling Jaya |
| 21:00 UTC+8 | Pedro Henrique 35'; Serginho 58', (yellow card) 69'; Muhaimin (yellow card) 68' | Report | Azam (yellow card) 57' | Stadium: Petaling Jaya City Council Stadium; Referee: Nazmi Nasaruddin |

| 14 May 2019 13 | Terengganu | 3–5 | Petaling Jaya City | Kuala Terengganu |
| 22:00 UTC+8 | Kipré 11'; Nabil 18'; Ashari 19'; Shaakhmedov (yellow card) 47'; Amirzafran (yellow card) 90+1' | Report | Elizeu 49'; Annas (yellow card) 50'; Pedro 57', 80'; Brandão 58'; Zamri 77'; Safee (yellow card) 90+1' | Stadium: Sultan Ismail Nasiruddin Shah Stadium; Referee: Mohd Amirul Izwan Yaacob |

| 17 May 2019 14 | Petaling Jaya City | 1–0 | Kuala Lumpur | Petaling Jaya |
| 22:00 UTC+8 | Brandão (yellow card) 77'; Safee 90+1' | Report | Indra Putra (yellow card) 63'; Fitri (yellow card) 86' | Stadium: Petaling Jaya City Council Stadium; Referee: Hamdan Awang |

| 25 May 2019 15 | PKNS | 3–0 | Petaling Jaya City | Shah Alam |
| 22:00 UTC+8 | Akram (yellow card) 17'; Rodney (yellow card) 47'; Guerra 50'; Sherman 53', 73' | Report | Serginho (yellow card) 44' | Stadium: Shah Alam Stadium; Referee: Fitri Maskon |

| 14 June 2019 16 | Petaling Jaya City | 0–1 | Perak | Petaling Jaya |
| 21:00 UTC+8 | Satish (yellow card) 26'; Subramaniam (yellow card) 65' (yellow-red card) 68'; Elizeu (yellow card) 87' | Report | Ronaldo 19'; Eldor (yellow card) 49'; Amirul (yellow card) 53'; Kenny (yellow card) 61'; Gan (yellow card) 90+5' | Stadium: Petaling Jaya City Council Stadium; Referee: Mat Zan Abd Wahab |

| 18 June 2019 17 | Petaling Jaya City | 1–0 | Felda United | Bukit Jalil |
| 21:00 UTC+8 | Aizulridzwan (yellow card) 10'; Safee 45+1'; Serginho (yellow card) 51' | Report | Khairul Amri (yellow card) 22'; Thiago Junio (yellow card) 49'; Watanabe (yellow card) 51' | Stadium: National Stadium; Referee: Mohd Zohri Tajuddin |

| 26 June 2019 18 | Kedah | 3–2 | Petaling Jaya City | Alor Setar |
| 21:00 UTC+8 | Baddrol 15'; Farhan 49', (yellow card) 90+3'; Shakir (yellow card) 57'; Fernando 76'; Alif (yellow card) 87' | Report | Brandão 60'; Ganiesh 66'; Thivandaran (yellow card) 90+4' | Stadium: Darul Aman Stadium; Referee: Suhaimi Mat Hassan |

| 6 July 2019 19 | Petaling Jaya City | 1–2 | Melaka United | Petaling Jaya |
| 21:00 UTC+8 | Pedro Henrique 14', (yellow card) 80'; Bae Beom-geun (yellow card) 21'; Elizeu (yellow card) 88' | Report | Jang Suk-won (yellow card) 16', (goal) 45+1'; Milunović 37', (yellow card) 90+5'; Balić (yellow card) 57'; Angan (yellow card) 90+2' | Stadium: Petaling Jaya Stadium; Referee: Mohd Fairuzi Mat Desa |

| 13 July 2019 20 | Selangor | 3–0 | Petaling Jaya City | Shah Alam |
| 21:00 UTC+8 | Regan (yellow card) 27'; Endrick 43'; Khyril 57'; Ifedayo 62' | Report | Nasriq (yellow card) 48'; Tinagaran (yellow card) 62' | Stadium: Shah Alam Stadium; Referee: Suhaimi Mat Hassan |

| 16 July 2019 21 | Johor Darul Ta'zim | 0–1 | Petaling Jaya City | Larkin |
| 21:00 UTC+8 | Fadhli (yellow card) 37'; Velázquez (yellow card) 39' | Report | Barathkumar (yellow card) 10'; Brandão 64' | Stadium: Tan Sri Dato' Haji Hassan Yunos Stadium; Referee: Hamdan Awang |

| 21 July 2019 22 | Petaling Jaya City | 1–0 | PKNP | Petaling Jaya |
| 21:00 UTC+8 | Brandão 75' (pen.); Thivandaran (yellow card) 82' | Report | Aguinaldo (yellow card) 31'; Hafiz (yellow card) 89' | Stadium: Petaling Jaya Stadium; Referee: Wan Mohamad Tarmizi Wan Ibrahim |

=== Malaysia FA Cup ===
| 3 March 2019 Second round | UiTM | 0–2 | Petaling Jaya City | Shah Alam |
| 21:00 UTC+8 | Faizal (yellow card) 66' | Report | Safee 9'; Pedro Henrique 30' | Stadium: UiTM Stadium; Referee: Khirulazuan Kidam |

| 16 March 2019 Third round | Kedah | 2–0 | Petaling Jaya City | Alor Setar |
| 21:00 UTC+8 | Renan 3', (yellow card) 3'; Azmeer (yellow card) 30'; Zaquan 55'; Bauman (yellow card) 82' | Report | | Stadium: Darul Aman Stadium; Referee: Wan Mohamad Tarmizi |

=== Malaysia Cup ===
==== Group stage ====
| Pos | Team | Pld | W | D | L | GF | GA | GD | Pts | Qualification | JDT | PKNP | PJC | UiTM |
|---|---|---|---|---|---|---|---|---|---|---|---|---|---|---|
| 1 | Johor Darul Ta'zim | 6 | 5 | 1 | 0 | 19 | 8 | +11 | 16 | Advance to knockout stage | — | 5–0 | 4–2 | 3–1 |
| 2 | PKNP | 6 | 3 | 1 | 2 | 12 | 9 | +3 | 10 | Advance to knockout stage | 2–2 | — | 3–0 | 4–0 |
| 3 | Petaling Jaya City | 6 | 3 | 0 | 3 | 9 | 11 | −2 | 9 | | 2–3 | 2–1 | — | 1–0 |
| 4 | UiTM | 6 | 0 | 0 | 6 | 2 | 14 | −12 | 0 | | 1–2 | 0–2 | 0–2 | — |

Source: FAM MFL

| 3 August 2019 1 | Petaling Jaya City | 2–1 | PKNP | Petaling Jaya |
| 21:00 UTC+8 | Pedro Henrique 12'; Brandão (yellow card) 56'; Elizeu 52' | Report | Pedro Victor 38' | Stadium: Petaling Jaya Stadium; Referee: Mohd Zohri Tajuddin |

=== Friendlies ===
| 14 March 2019 Friendly | Petaling Jaya City | 2–0 | Australia U-23 | Shah Alam, Malaysia |
| 21:00 UTC+8 | | Report | | Stadium: Shah Alam Stadium |

== Squad statistics ==
=== Appearances and goals ===
| No. | Pos | Nat | Player | Total | | League | | FA Cup | | Malaysia Cup | |
| No. | Pos | Nat | Player | Apps | Goals | Apps | Goals | Apps | Goals | Apps | Goals |
Goalkeepers
| 1 | GK | (Malaysia) MAS | Muhaimin Mohamad | 21 | 0 | 19 | 0 | 2 | 0 | 0 | 0 |
| 21 | GK | (Malaysia) MAS | Hairul Fazreen | 0 | 0 | 0 | 0 | 0 | 0 | 0 | 0 |
| 22 | GK | (Malaysia) MAS | Kalamullah Al-Hafiz | 4 | 0 | 3 | 0 | 0 | 0 | 1 | 0 |
Defenders
| 2 | DF | (Malaysia) MAS | Annas Rahmat | 20 | 0 | 15+2 | 0 | 2 | 0 | 1 | 0 |
| 3 | DF | (Malaysia) MAS | S. Subramaniam | 9 | 0 | 7+1 | 0 | 0 | 0 | 1 | 0 |
| 6 | DF | (Malaysia) MAS | Ganiesh Gunasegaran | 9 | 1 | 3+6 | 1 | 0 | 0 | 0 | 0 |
| 11 | DF | (Malaysia) MAS | Aizulridzwan Razali | 20 | 1 | 16+2 | 1 | 1 | 0 | 1 | 0 |
| 16 | DF | (Malaysia) MAS | Zamri Pin Ramli | 15 | 1 | 5+7 | 1 | 1+1 | 0 | 0+1 | 0 |
| 17 | DF | (Malaysia) MAS | Rajesh Perumal | 24 | 1 | 21 | 1 | 2 | 0 | 1 | 0 |
| 24 | DF | (Malaysia) MAS | Tinagaran Baskeran | 18 | 0 | 12+4 | 0 | 2 | 0 | 0 | 0 |
| 28 | DF | (Malaysia) MAS | Nasriq Baharom | 5 | 0 | 3+2 | 0 | 0 | 0 | 0 | 0 |
Midfielders
| 5 | MF | (Brazil) BRA | Elizeu | 24 | 2 | 21 | 1 | 2 | 0 | 1 | 1 |
| 7 | MF | (Malaysia) MAS | Yoges Muniandy | 3 | 0 | 0+3 | 0 | 0 | 0 | 0 | 0 |
| 8 | MF | (South Korea) KOR | Bae Beom-geun | 23 | 0 | 20 | 0 | 2 | 0 | 1 | 0 |
| 12 | MF | (Malaysia) MAS | Barathkumar Ramaloo | 19 | 2 | 16+1 | 2 | 1 | 0 | 1 | 0 |
| 13 | MF | (Malaysia) MAS | Thivandran Karnan | 13 | 0 | 7+5 | 0 | 0+1 | 0 | 0 | 0 |
| 15 | MF | (Malaysia) MAS | Youwarasan Maniom | 1 | 0 | 1 | 0 | 0 | 0 | 0 | 0 |
| 18 | MF | (Malaysia) MAS | Sivakumar Munusamy | 0 | 0 | 0 | 0 | 0 | 0 | 0 | 0 |
| 23 | MF | (Malaysia) MAS | Veenod Subramaniam | 18 | 0 | 6+9 | 0 | 1+1 | 0 | 0+1 | 0 |
| 30 | MF | (Brazil) BRA | Serginho | 20 | 1 | 16+1 | 1 | 2 | 0 | 1 | 0 |
Forwards
| 9 | FW | (Brazil) BRA | Washington Brandão | 12 | 4 | 11 | 4 | 0 | 0 | 1 | 0 |
| 10 | FW | (Malaysia) MAS | Safee Sali | 17 | 4 | 10+4 | 3 | 1+1 | 1 | 0+1 | 0 |
| 14 | FW | (Malaysia) MAS | Yugan Poobathy | 0 | 0 | 0 | 0 | 0 | 0 | 0 | 0 |
| 19 | FW | (Malaysia) MAS | Marcus Mah Yung Jian | 3 | 0 | 1+2 | 0 | 0 | 0 | 0 | 0 |
| 20 | FW | (Malaysia) MAS | Satish Krishnan | 13 | 0 | 2+9 | 0 | 0+2 | 0 | 0 | 0 |
| 27 | FW | (Malaysia) MAS | A. Thamil Arasu | 1 | 0 | 0+1 | 0 | 0 | 0 | 0 | 0 |
| 29 | FW | (Timor-Leste) TLS | Pedro Henrique | 11 | 5 | 9+1 | 4 | 0 | 0 | 1 | 1 |
Players away from the club on loan or left the club
| 4 | DF | (Philippines) PHI | Joshua Grommen | 9 | 0 | 7+1 | 0 | 1 | 0 | 0 | 0 |
| 9 | FW | (Brazil) BRA | Pedro Henrique | 11 | 3 | 8+1 | 2 | 2 | 1 | 0 | 0 |
| 10 | FW | (Brazil) BRA | Giancarlo | 3 | 1 | 3 | 1 | 0 | 0 | 0 | 0 |

Last updated: 3 August 2019
Source: Competitions

=== Disciplinary record ===
As of 3 August 2019

| No. | Pos. | Name | League | | | FA Cup | | | Malaysia Cup | | | Total | | |
| No. | Pos. | Name | Booked | (yellow card) (yellow-red card) | Sent off (straight red) | Booked | (yellow card) (yellow-red card) | Sent off (straight red) | Booked | (yellow card) (yellow-red card) | Sent off (straight red) | Booked | (yellow card) (yellow-red card) | Sent off (straight red) |
|---|---|---|---|---|---|---|---|---|---|---|---|---|---|---|
| 1 | GK | Muhaimin Mohamad | 2 | | | | | | | | | 2 | | |
| 2 | DF | Annas Rahmat | 1 | | | | | | | | | 1 | | |
| 3 | DF | S. Subramaniam | 1 | | | | | | | | | 1 | | |
| 5 | MF | Elizeu | 3 | | | | | | | | | 3 | | |
| 6 | DF | Ganiesh Gunasegaran | 1 | | | | | | | | | 1 | | |
| 8 | MF | Bae Beom-geun | 3 | | | | | | | | | 3 | | |
| 9 | FW | Washington Brandão | 1 | | | | | | 1 | | | 2 | | |
| 10 | FW | Safee Sali | 2 | | | | | | | | | 2 | | |
| 11 | DF | Aizulridzwan Razali | 1 | 1 | | | | | | | | 1 | 1 | |
| 12 | MF | Barathkumar Ramaloo | 4 | | | | | | | | | 4 | | |
| 13 | MF | Thivandran Karnan | 3 | | | | | | | | | 3 | | |
| 17 | DF | Rajesh Perumal | 2 | | | | | | | | | 2 | | |
| 20 | FW | Satish Krishnan | 2 | | | | | | | | | 2 | | |
| 23 | MF | S. Veenod | 1 | | | | | | | | | 1 | | |
| 24 | DF | Tinagaran Baskeran | 3 | | | | | | | | | 3 | | |
| 29 | FW | Pedro Henrique | 1 | | | | | | | | | 1 | | |
| 30 | MF | Serginho | 4 | | | | | | | | | 4 | | |
| 4 | DF | Joshua Grommen | 1 | | | | | | | | | 1 | | |
| 9 | FW | Pedro Henrique | 2 | | | | | | | | | 2 | | |
| Total | | | 37 | 1 | 0 | 0 | 0 | 0 | 1 | 0 | 0 | 38 | 1 | 0 |
