= 2020 Petaling Jaya City FC season =

Petaling Jaya City
2020 season
- Owner: Vijay Eswaran
- President: Subahan Kamal
- Head coach: Maniam Pachaiappan
- Stadium: MBPJ Stadium
- Malaysia Super League: 7th
- Malaysia FA Cup: Cancelled
- Top goalscorer: League: Kogileswaran Raj; Washington Brandão (4); All: Kogileswaran Raj; Washington Brandão (4)
Home colours	Away colours

The 2020 season was Petaling Jaya City FC's 17th season since its establishment in 2004. The club participated in the Malaysia Super League for the 2nd time since 2019.

== Players ==
=== Current squad ===
Note: Flags indicate national team as defined under FIFA eligibility rules; some limited exceptions apply. Players may hold more than one non-FIFA nationality.

No.	Pos.	Nation	Player
1	GK	(Malaysia) MAS	Damien Lim
2	DF	(Malaysia) MAS	Aroon Kumar
3	DF	(Malaysia) MAS	Syazwan Zaipol
5	DF	(Brazil) BRA	Elizeu
6	FW	(Malaysia) MAS	Yugan Poobathy
7	FW	(Malaysia) MAS	Kogileswaran Raj
10	FW	(Malaysia) MAS	Safee Sali
11	FW	(Brazil) BRA	Washington Brandão
12	MF	(Malaysia) MAS	Barathkumar Ramaloo
13	MF	(Malaysia) MAS	Thivandaran Karnan
14	DF	(Malaysia) MAS	Jeremy Lim
15	DF	(Malaysia) MAS	Youwarasan Maniom
16	MF	(Thailand) THA	Anawin Jujeen
17	MF	(Malaysia) MAS	Rajes Perumal
18	MF	(Malaysia) MAS	Mahalli Jasuli
19	MF	(Malaysia) MAS	Christie Jayaseelan

No.	Pos.	Nation	Player
20	FW	(Guinea) GUI	Demba Camara
21	GK	(Malaysia) MAS	Syihan Hazmi
22	GK	(Malaysia) MAS	Kalamullah Al-Hafiz
23	MF	(Malaysia) MAS	Salamon Raj
25	GK	(Malaysia) MAS	Aqil Razak
26	DF	(Malaysia) MAS	Amer Saidin
27	DF	(Malaysia) MAS	Filemon Anyie
30	MF	(Malaysia) MAS	Kugan Dhevarajan
33	DF	(Malaysia) MAS	Gunalan Padathan
36	DF	(Malaysia) MAS	Fitri Omar
66	DF	(Malaysia) MAS	Nabil Hakim
77	MF	(Malaysia) MAS	Gurusamy Kandasamy
89	DF	(Malaysia) MAS	Yogaraj Murugan
90	DF	(South Korea) KOR	Kim Bong-jin
96	DF	(Malaysia) MAS	Kannan Kalaiselvan

=== Out on loan ===
Note: Flags indicate national team as defined under FIFA eligibility rules; some limited exceptions apply. Players may hold more than one non-FIFA nationality.

No.	Pos.	Nation	Player
35	FW	(Philippines) PHI	Mark Hartmann (on loan to UiTM FC)

== Transfers ==
=== Transfers in ===
No.	Position	Name	Transferred from	Type/fee	Contract length	Ref
2	DF	Aroon Kumar	Negeri Sembilan	Free transfer	1 year	
3	DF	Syazwan Zaipol	Perak	Free transfer	1 year	
7	FW	Kogileswaran Raj	Sri Pahang	Free transfer	1 year	
14	DF	Jeremy Lim	PKNP	Free transfer	1 year	
16	MF	(Thailand) Anawin Jujeen	(Thailand) PTT Rayong	Free transfer	1 year	
18	MF	Mahalli Jasuli	Johor Darul Ta'zim	Free transfer	1 year	
19	MF	Christie Jayaseelan	Felda United	Free transfer	1 year	
20	FW	(Guinea) Demba Camara	(Israel) Hapoel Tel Aviv	Free transfer	1 year	
21	GK	Syihan Hazmi	Negeri Sembilan	Free transfer	1 year	
23	MF	Salamon Raj	Sri Pahang	Free transfer	1 year	
26	DF	Amer Saidin	Johor Darul Ta'zim II	Free transfer	1 year	
27	DF	Filemon Anyie	PKNP	Free transfer	1 year	
30	MF	Kugan Dhevarajan	Selangor	Free transfer	1 year	
35	FW	(Philippines) Mark Hartmann	(Philippines) Ceres-Negros	Free transfer	1 year	
36	DF	Fitri Omar	Kuala Lumpur City	Free transfer	1 year	
77	MF	Gurusamy Kandasamy	PKNS	Free transfer	1 year	
90	DF	(South Korea) Kim Bong-jin	(Vietnam) Hoang Anh Gia Lai	Free transfer	1 year	
96	DF	Kannan Kalaiselvan	PKNS	Free transfer	1 year	

==== From youth squad ====
N	Pos.	Nat.	Name	Age	Notes
25	GK	(Malaysia)	Aqil Razak	22	

=== Transfers out ===
No.	Position	Player	Transferred to	Type/fee	Ref
1	GK	Muhaimin Mohamad	Felda United	Free transfer	
2	DF	Annas Rahmat	Melaka United	Free transfer	
3	DF	S. Subramaniam	Kuala Lumpur City	Free transfer	
7	MF	Yoges Muniandy	Penang	Free transfer	
8	MF	(South Korea) Bae Beom-geun	(El Salvador) Sereď	Free transfer	
11	DF	Aizulridzwan Razali	Melaka United	Free transfer	
16	DF	Zamri Pin Ramli	Penang	Free transfer	
21	GK	Hairol Fazreen	Released		
23	MF	S. Veenod	PDRM	Free transfer	
24	DF	Tinagaran Baskeran	Released		
27	FW	A. Thamil Arasu	Released		
28	DF	Nasriq Baharom	Immigration	Free transfer	
29	FW	(Timor-Leste) Pedro Henrique Oliveira	(Bangladesh) Sheikh Russel	Free transfer	
30	MF	(Brazil) Serginho (footballer, born 1988)	(Brazil) Paysandu	Free transfer	

== Squad statistics ==
=== Appearances and goals ===
No.	Pos	Nat	Player	Total		League	
No.	Pos	Nat	Player	Apps	Goals	Apps	Goals
2	DF	(Malaysia) MAS	Aroon Kumar	11	0	11	0
3	DF	(Malaysia) MAS	Syazwan Zaipol	4	0	2+2	0
5	DF	(Brazil) BRA	Elizeu	10	1	10	1
7	FW	(Malaysia) MAS	Kogileswaran Raj	8	4	1+7	4
10	FW	(Malaysia) MAS	Safee Sali	6	1	1+5	1
11	FW	(Brazil) BRA	Washington Brandão	11	4	11	4
12	MF	(Malaysia) MAS	Barathkumar Ramaloo	8	2	7+1	2
13	MF	(Malaysia) MAS	Thivandaran Karnan	5	0	0+5	0
16	MF	(Thailand) THA	Anawin Jujeen	8	1	7+1	1
18	MF	(Malaysia) MAS	Mahalli Jasuli	9	1	5+4	1
19	MF	(Malaysia) MAS	Christie Jayaseelan	6	1	4+2	1
20	FW	(Guinea) GUI	Demba Camara	3	1	3	1
21	GK	(Malaysia) MAS	Syihan Hazmi	4	0	4	0
22	GK	(Malaysia) MAS	Kalamullah Al-Hafiz	7	0	7	0
23	MF	(Malaysia) MAS	Salamon Raj	5	0	1+4	0
26	DF	(Malaysia) MAS	Amer Saidin	4	0	4	0
27	DF	(Malaysia) MAS	Filemon Anyie	6	0	5+1	0
30	MF	(Malaysia) MAS	Kugan Dhevarajan	7	0	3+4	0
33	DF	(Malaysia) MAS	Gunalan Padathan	5	0	0+5	0
77	MF	(Malaysia) MAS	Gurusamy Kandasamy	9	1	9	1
90	DF	(South Korea) KOR	Kim Bong-jin	9	0	9	0
96	DF	(Malaysia) MAS	Kannan Kalaiselvan	8	0	5+3	0
Players away from the club on loan:
35	FW	(Philippines) PHI	Mark Hartmann	3	0	3	0
Players who left club during the season:
