= Kalamullah Al-Hafiz =

Malaysian footballer

Personal information
- Full name: Kalamullah Al-Hafiz bin Mat Rowi
- Date of birth: 30 July 1995 (age 31)
- Place of birth: Pasir Puteh, Malaysia
- Height: 1.81 m (5 ft 11 1/2 in)
- Position: Goalkeeper

Team information
- Current team: Selangor
- Number: 33

Youth career
- 2012–2013: Kelantan
- 2014–2016: Felda United

Senior career*
Years	Team	Apps	(Gls)
2017–2018	Felda United	1	(0)
2019–2022	Petaling Jaya City	54	(0)
2023–2024	Kedah Darul Aman	29	(0)
2024–	Selangor	27	(0)

International career^{‡}
2022–	Malaysia	2	(0)
Medal record
Men's football
Representing Malaysia
Merdeka Tournament
Winner	2024
King's Cup
Runner-up	2022
- * Club domestic league appearances and goals as of 27 May 2026 ‡ National team caps and goals as of 21 December 2024

Kalamullah Al-Hafiz bin Mat Rowi (Jawi: كلام الله الحافظ بن مات الراوي, IPA: [kalamullah al-hafɪz bɪn mat 'rowɪ]; born 30 July 1995) is a Malaysian professional footballer who plays as a goalkeeper for Malaysia Super League club Selangor and the Malaysia national team.

== Club career ==
=== Petaling Jaya City ===
After his contract with Felda United expired, Kalamullah joined Petaling Jaya City in 2019. He started as third-choice goalkeeper and made his debut for the club in a 0–3 loss to Selangor on 13 July 2019.

=== Kedah Darul Aman ===
On 7 December 2022, Kalamullah signed a two-year contract with Kedah Darul Aman. He made his debut for the club on 25 February 2023, starting in a 4–1 league away win over Perak. On 15 September 2024, Kalamullah and Kedah Darul Aman reached a mutual agreement to terminate his contract at the middle of the 2024 season, ending his time at the club after one and half years.

=== Selangor ===
On 16 September 2024, Selangor announced they had signed Kalamullah on a free transfer from Kedah Darul Aman.

== International career ==
Kalamullah received his first call up for the Malaysian national team on 23 September 2021. He made his international debut on 9 December 2022 during the friendly match against Cambodia keeping a clean sheet in a 4–0 win.

== Career statistics ==
=== Club ===
As of match played 27 May 2026

Appearances and goals by club, season and competition
Club	Season	League			Cup (Note: Includes Malaysia FA Cup)		League Cup (Note: Includes Malaysia Cup)		Continental		Other		Total	
Club	Season	Division	Apps	Goals	Apps	Goals	Apps	Goals	Apps	Goals	Apps	Goals	Apps	Goals
Felda United	2017	Malaysia Super League	0	0	0	0	0	0	–				0	0
Felda United	2018	Malaysia Premier League	1	0	0	0	0	0	–				1	0
Felda United	Total		1	0	0	0	0	0	0	0	0	0	1	0
Petaling Jaya City	2019	Malaysia Super League	3	0	0	0	1	0	–				4	0
Petaling Jaya City	2020	Malaysia Super League	7	0	–								7	0
Petaling Jaya City	2021	Malaysia Super League	19	0	–		6	0	–				25	0
Petaling Jaya City	2022	Malaysia Super League	21	0	1	0	2	0	–				24	0
Petaling Jaya City	Total		50	0	1	0	9	0	0	0	0	0	60	0
Kedah Darul Aman	2023	Malaysia Super League	21	0	1	0	2	0	–				24	0
Kedah Darul Aman	2024–25	Malaysia Super League	8	0	5	0	0	0	–				13	0
Kedah Darul Aman	Total		29	0	6	0	2	0	0	0	0	0	37	0
Selangor	2024–25	Malaysia Super League	10	0	0	0	0	0	1 (Note: Appearances in AFC Champions League Two)	0	5 (Note: Appearance(s) in MFL Challenge Cup)	0	16	0
Selangor	2025–26	Malaysia Super League	17	0	2	0	6	0	4	0	5 (Note: Appearance(s) in ASEAN Club Championship)	0	34	0
Selangor	Total		27	0	2	0	6	0	5	0	10	0	50	0
Career Total			107	0	9	0	17	0	5	0	10	0	148	0

=== International ===
As of match played 11 December 2024

National team	Year	Apps	Goals
Malaysia
Malaysia	2024	2	0
Total		2	0

== Honours ==
Felda United

- Malaysia Premier League: 2018

Selangor

- MFL Challenge Cup: 2024-25
- ASEAN Club Championship: runner-up 2025–26

Malaysia

- King's Cup runner-up: 2022
- Merdeka Tournament: 2024

Individual

- ASEAN Club Championship: Best Goalkepper 2025–26
