= Michael Ferreira =

Indian billiards player

Michael Ferreira (born 1 October 1938 in Bombay [now Mumbai]), nicknamed "the Bombay Tiger", is an Indian amateur player of English billiards, and a three-time Amateur World Champion. He participated in the Indian National Billiards Championship in 1960 for the first time, and in 1964 represented India in the World Amateur Billiards Championship (WABC) held in New Zealand, where he progressed to the semi-finals. In 1977, he won his first World Amateur Billiards Champion title and followed it up with the World Open Billiards Championship title in the same year. He has two other WABC titles. In 1978 he became the first amateur to break the barrier of 1,000 points, in the billiards national championships, and created a new amateur world record by scoring 1,149 points.

== Early life ==
Ferreira studied in St. Joseph's School, Darjeeling, where he became interested in playing billiards. He was able to sustain his interest in the game during his college days in St. Xavier's College and the Government Law College in Mumbai.

== Current life ==
Currently Ferreira is associated with Qnet, a network marketing company. He holds 80 percent shareholding in Vihaan Direct Selling India Private Limited, which is the franchise for the Qnet brand in India. Ferreira faces accusations of misconduct in connection with his investment in Qnet, and has been ordered to surrender to the police. Ferreira has denied the charges, calling them "outrageous, malicious and untruthful".

On 30 September 2016, Ferreira, along with three other directors of Vihaan, were arrested by the economic offences wing (EOW) of the Mumbai Police in relation to the Qnet scam. He was later granted bail by the Supreme Court of India.

== Awards and honors ==
Ferreira was awarded the Padma Shri award in 1981, after he had won his second world amateur title. But he refused to accept this and contended that as cricketer Sunil Gavaskar was offered the more prestigious Padma Bhushan award, he too should be awarded the same. He is the first billiards player to be awarded with the Padma Bhushan, the third-highest civilian award in India, which was conferred on him after he won his third world amateur billiards title in 1983. He is also the recipient of the Maharashtra state government's Shiv Chhatrapati Award (1971), the Arjuna Award (1973) and the International Fair Play Committee's Letter of Congratulations (1983). He received the Dronacharya Award in 2001 for his coaching achievements in billiards and snooker.
