= Qnet =

Hong Kong based multi-level marketing company

QNet
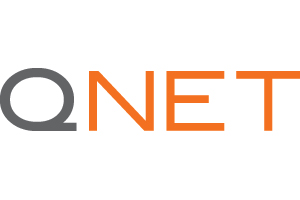
- Type: Wholly owned subsidiary
- Industry: Multi-level marketing
- Founded: 1998; 28 years ago
- Founder: Vijay Eswaran
- Headquarters: Hong Kong
- Key people: Malou Caluza (CEO)
- Products: Consumer Goods, Watches, Health Devices
- Services: Travel, life style, Education
- Number of employees: 1,500 (2017)
- Parent: Qi Group
- Website: www.qnet.net

Qnet Ltd, formerly known as QuestNet and GoldQuest, is a Hong Kong–based multi-level marketing (MLM) company owned by the QI Group. QNet was founded in 1998 by Vijay Eswaran and Joseph Bismark. The company's products include energy, weight management, nutrition, personal care, home care and fashion accessories on an e-commerce platform.

The company operates legally in some countries, but has been charged as a Ponzi scheme and multi-level marketing in countries like India. The government of India and the Telecom Regulatory Authority of India banned the site in the country after a protest spread in Bangalore.

== History ==
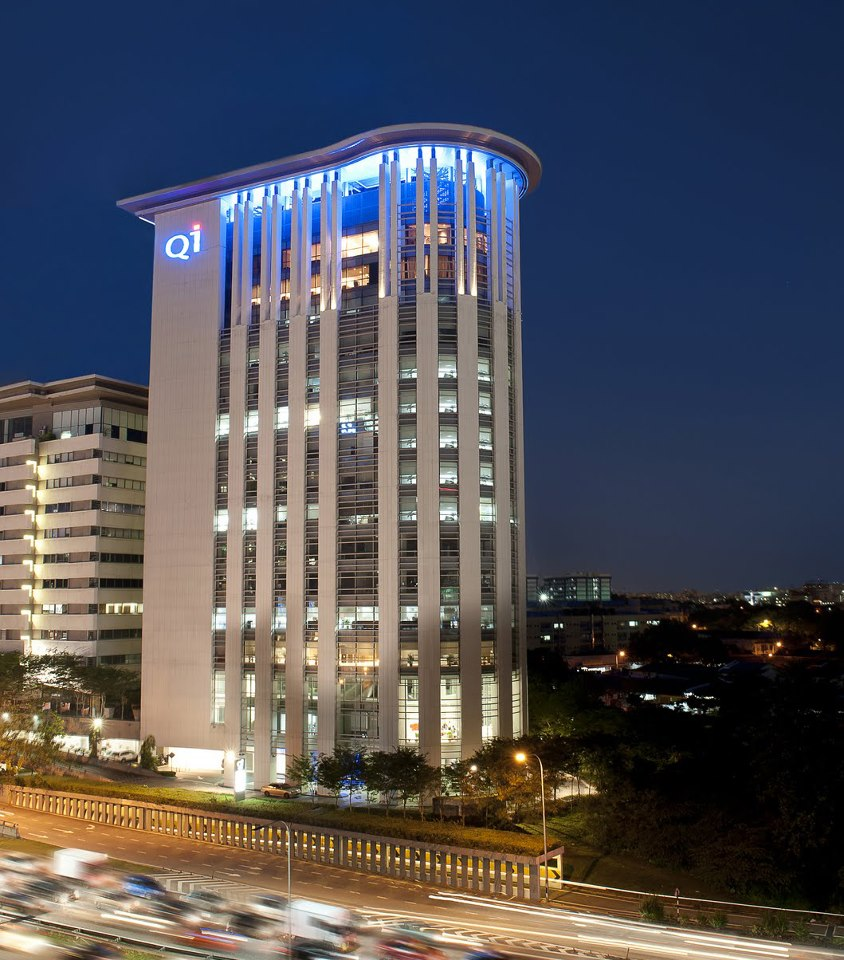
Global Support Centre of Qi group (The Qi Tower) in Petaling Jaya

=== 1998–2000 ===
QNet was founded in 1998 in Hong Kong by businessmen Vijay Eswaran and Joseph Bismark. Though born and brought up in Malaysia, Eswaran undertook his higher education in the United Kingdom where he learned how multi-level marketing schemes work.

The company was first known as GoldQuest and then QuestNet before the name was shortened to QNet in 2010. In the beginning, it made custom-commissioned commemorative coins and later began selling jewellery and watches. In 1999, Qnet expanded its operations to Malaysia and Singapore and began a partnership with B.H. Mayer's Mint, a German-based mint coin facility. By 2002, the company was active in India, the United Arab Emirates, Indonesia, Thailand, Australia, the United Kingdom, and Eastern Europe.

In 2000, Qnet was the official distributor of the Sydney Olympic Games commemorative coins. It was later named a distributor of FIFA's Centennial Commemorative coin set in 2004 and a distributor at the 2004 Athens Olympic Games and 2008 Beijing Olympic Games.

=== 2001–2018 ===
The company expanded its operations to Dubai, India, Indonesia and Thailand in 2001. Qnet started to diversify its products in 2002 into travel and vacations by partnering with QVI Club brand holidays. During this time, the company also announced that it was the official coin distributor for the 2002 FIFA World Cup and an expansion into Europe, Australia and Sri Lanka.

In 2005, QI Group acquired QI Comm, a British telecommunications company. That same year, the company introduced aspIRe Magazine and announced that there were one million Qnet independent representatives around the world. In 2006, Qnet began marketing energy, health and nutritional products. Also in 2006, QI Group acquired Prana Resorts and Spa, a vegetarian holiday resort in Koh Samui. QI Group also acquired the Swiss watchmaker, Cimier. In 2007, the QI Group acquired Down To Earth (DTE), a vegetarian organic health store chain in Hawaii.

The company announced its sponsorship of Team Meritus, a Malaysian motor racing team, and became a sponsor for the Commonwealth Heads Of Government Meeting Business Forum in 2007.

From 2009 to 2012, Qnet was an official sponsor of the Asian Football Confederation during the AFC Champions League. In 2010, the company partnered with Virgin Racing. Qnet received the TRUSTe Privacy Certification in late 2012. Qnet announced its intention to shift its manufacturing operations to India and to open an office in Russia in 2013. The company's QI Tower in Malaysia received the 2013 Building and Construction Authority (BCA) Green Mark Gold Award. In 2014, Qnet started a three-year partnership with Manchester City football club to become the club's official direct selling partner. The deal was then expanded in 2017, and signed a similar deal with the Confederation of African Football in 2018.

Since it opened in 1998, Qnet (Questnet at the time) promoted gold and silver coins. The coin collection business was outlawed in some countries. Though registered in Hong Kong, the company has never operated there or in China. Its majority customer base remains in India and a few African countries. A few years later Questnet changed its name to Qnet and offered additional products via the MLM system. It promotes its products using claims "that would not pass official muster in much of the world." Despite claiming to be an e-commerce based business, an ordinary retail customer can purchase a product only if they have a referrer ID of an independent Qnet representative. Qnet used websites such as www.Qnetindia.in, www.Qnetindia.net, www.Qnet.net and www.questnet.net to conduct its business. These were blocked by Indian Computer emergency response team (CERT) following a court order. Other websites like portal.Qnetindia.net, are under investigation.

The company continues to operate in countries including India, and sells its products using a multi-level marketing model, whereby independent representatives refer the products to consumers and receive compensation based on the sales volume of their referrals and the sales volume of other independent representatives in their teams.

The company has operations in 25 countries worldwide with offices in Indonesia, Malaysia, Hong Kong, Philippines, United Arab Emirates, and Ireland. The company also has franchise companies in India and Turkey.

It was sued by Egypt, Rwanda, and Sri Lanka for allegedly operating a product-based pyramid scheme. The company and its franchise Vihaan are under investigation in India. The Bombay High Court denied the anticipatory bail plea of the directors of Vihaan Direct Selling Pvt Ltd., a franchise of Qnet, which included world amateur billiards champion Michael Ferreira after it was earlier rejected by Sessions Court. They were facing charges of cheating and forgery The court observed that "the deceit and fraud is camouflaged under the name of e-marketing and business". The Delhi High Court also called it a multi-victim scam and refused to quash FIR against the directors of Indian franchise of Qnet, Vihaan Direct Selling Private Limited. The Serious Fraud Investigation Office, in its report on GoldQuest and QuestNet India has called multi-level marketing (MLM) schemes run by overseas operators as "a potential threat to national security". The Government of India ordered the Serious Fraud Investigation Office to file prosecution against GoldQuest International and QuestNet Enterprise under the Companies Act and Indian Penal Code. A brief executive summary of the SFIO report is now available in the public domain. The company has denied the allegations.

=== Since 2019 ===
In 2019, Malou Caluza was announced as Qnet's new CEO, becoming the first female to hold the position. She began working at the company as its first Customer Service Officer.

== Business model ==
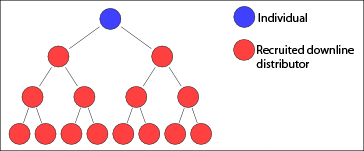
A typical MLM binary tree structure. The blue individual will receive compensation from the sales of the downline red members.

Customers can choose to become "independent representatives" (IRs) of the company by paying $10 for a starter kit and an online office. IRs receive $250 commission after they introduce the products to six people, placing three people on their left and three people on their right, described as two 'legs'. When an IR introduces a new customer who then becomes an IR themselves, the original IR benefits (by receiving bonus points) from the success of their recruit. These bonus points build up on only one of the IR's legs. The IR must then find recruits for the other leg in order to receive commissions.

Many government entities described Qnet's business model as a pyramid scheme: early entrants earn money, and as the number of Independent Representatives (IRs) increases, finding more IRs to join becomes difficult or impossible; IRs that join late do not earn enough to cover their first outlay and the model collapses.

As per an official spokesperson, even though sign-up fees are not charged, a purchase might be required. This may be in the form of the sale of a qualifying product to a retail customer or by the new representative making a qualifying purchase.

== Products and subsidiaries ==
Initially in 1998 Qnet sold gold commemorative coins. The company expanded its products to include travel and vacations in 2002 through a partnership with QVI Club brand holidays. In 2006, they added wellness, health, and nutritional products. As of 2021, the company sells products related to home care, beauty and personal care, holidays and travel, education, wellness, watches and jewelry, and nutrition.

Some of its products fall under a "wellness" brand, such as the Amezcua Bio Disc (also spelled BioDisc and BioDisk). According to Quest Net's advertisement, the disc creates a 'water-impacting' energy field that 'helps to reduce stress, improve sleep'. The company claims that it was invented by Dr Ian Lyons, but his antecedents and research publication are not known. Schott AG is the only industrial glass manufacturer that certifies production of Biodisc, but does not reflect Qnet's advertising that it is 'creating an impact energy field'. The Amezcua Bio Disc has been evaluated by research facilities in Germany, India and Japan. The product has received scrutiny from various scientists, media commentators and watchdogs.

The subsidiary QI properties announced in 2016 that it would begin construction of QI City, a mixed-use development in Malaysia. It was due to be completed in 2020, consisting of an 840-bed teaching hospital, 768 condominium units, a convention center, and a 460-bed hotel. The development is the location of Quest International University's Perak campus.

== Controversies ==
Qnet has faced controversies since soon after its founding. It has faced litigation in many countries and hundreds of IRs working for it and/or its many subsidiaries have been arrested.

=== Gold coins ===
GoldQuest marketed a gold coin at a 100% premium over similar coins. The President of the Madras Coin Society warned that the Goldquest coin was neither a period coin nor it was from an authorized body. Australian politician Cameron Thompson, the Nepalese Home Ministry, the Sri Lankan Central Bank, and the Iranian Government described GoldQuest as a pyramid scheme. In 2002, the Australian Office of Consumer and Business Affairs listed the company as one of 61 alleged pyramid schemes. The Fatwa council at Dar al-Ifta al-Misriyyah declared that the binary form of transaction adopted by Qnet is prohibited under Sharia law.

=== 2003 ===
In 2003, Indian police arrested two QI group senior managers in Chennai and froze the company bank account after receiving complaints from more than 50 of its members. In Philippines, the Department of Trade and Industry issued a cease and desist order after a complaint from a member. In Cambodia Goldquest organized the launch of Ankor Wat commemorative coins among 500 young Khmers who had paid $5 to attend and pick up a starter kit to help them sell. Managing Director, Richard Zinkiewicz, insisted that Questnet was not a pyramid scheme, because customers were never obligated to sell products and the product had real value. He said that the coins' high value was because they are limited edition collectibles. Eswaran claimed that the opportunities offered by QI could change members' lives. Royal Monetary Authority of Bhutan asserted that GoldQuest was a pyramid scheme.

Nepal banned the company from operating there in 2003, while Bahadur Manandhar, chief of the foreign exchange department of the Nepal Rastra Bank, said GoldQuest was "a hundred percent fraud". Sri Lanka banned GoldQuest in 2005, claiming that the company had caused 15 million dollars to leave the country.

India declared both Goldquest and Questnet to be Ponzi scheme companies.

=== 2007–2009 ===
In 2007, APLI, the direct selling Association of Indonesia, called GoldQuest a pyramid scheme. Interpol arrested Eswaran and other company officials for fraud. Qnet responded that the allegation was unfounded. After three weeks, Indonesian courts released Eswaran and dismissed the charges soon afterward. Qnet continued to operate there.

In 2008, around 3,000 people marched on the presidential palace in Kabul to demonstrate against the temporary withdrawal of QuestNet's license to operate. The business launched with around 600 IRs in 2006 and had expanded to 21,000 when the government temporarily withdrew the license to enable it to write operating laws. Rwanda banned QuestNet in 2009 for legal violations after The National Bank of Rwanda described the company as a pyramid scheme. Questnet appealed and was granted relief on condition that it follow the country's laws. That year Sudan banned QuestNet after allegations were made relating to poor product quality and the non-receipt of products. The same year, Syria shut down QuestNet for violating its commercial registration, stating that the company had operated a pyramid scheme and withdrawn billions of Syrian pounds from the country, while paying few taxes. The shutdown applied to all company agencies.

=== 2010–2012 ===
In 2010 Questnet opened in Turkey with 150 distributors. Police subsequently charged 42 of them with gaining an unfair advantage. In 2011, the country investigated Qnet. The Trade Minister warned citizens against such structures, claiming that 96 percent of members. About 20 million dollars were collected from the public. 75 people were taken into custody in Qnet offices. They were accused of contacting unemployed young people. New members paid $570-$1750 to join. A commission for each new member started at US$250. Members sold Chinese goods such as watches, necklaces. In 2011, QI Group resumed operations in Turkey with the acquisition of the Dögan Hotel in Antalya. Eleven members were taken into custody for questioning. The Mardin Security Directorate arrested 12 people including a leader from Iran working QuestNet's Titan Happiness chain. About 110 thousand pounds of cash were reported to have been seized. They continued operating as Qnet after QuestNet was suspended. 53 people working for Questnet were detained in Ankara, Çorum, Antalya and Istanbul. An investigation was initiated against Eswaran. 30 thousand members lost money in a 50 million dollar fraud when the Turkey leg of the network collapsed.

Egypt, Saudi Arabia, Indonesia and India accused Qnet of operating a product-based pyramid scheme. Dar al-Ifta issued Qnet a fatwā in 2012 stating Qnet's business in Egypt is haram (forbidden under Islamic law). In 2010 Saudi Arabia banned Qnet, accusing the company of theft, falsification, and failure to register, while warning citizens to avoid involvement in fraudulent schemes, mentioning Qnet specifically. Iran announced the arrest 30 of Goldquest members on charges of defrauding people of more than 5 trillion rials. Goldquest had been banned in 2005. Thirteen Qnet members in Tehran were arrested. GoldQuest disputed Iran's findings, claiming that their Iranian operations were simply network marketing. Journalist Donald Frazier said in 2012 that the charges against Qnet "tend to originate in apocryphal, anonymous or debunked sources".

=== 2013–2015 ===
In August 2013, India made its first arrest in a case that began in 2008. Members were arrested for cheating. Investigations reached Bangalore and Chennai. Six of Qnet's bank accounts were frozen. A case of money laundering was registered against Qnet, its franchise Vihaan Direct Selling, and a few others. About 200 members of PT Qnet Indonesia alleged fraud. Losses were estimated to be between Rp 7 million – Rp 10 million per person. Kazakhstan banned Qnet. In Philippines Goldquest failed to submit its annual report for the years 1999–2000, 2002–2003, 2007–2013 and 2009–12, as required by the Corporation code and had its license revoked. In June 2014, Chairman of the Fatwa Commission of the Indonesian Ulema Council (MUI) Riau province, appealed to citizens to avoid the business.

In June, 2014, Tajikistan newspaper 'Jumhuriyat attacked Qnet as a dangerous financial pyramid. The company claimed the accusations were false. In September, Qnet sued private radio station and journalist Orzu Isoyev to protect its reputation after the station called the company the next pyramid. Religious leaders stated that the company's activities violated Sharia law. This was because the activity involved deceiving people and because the work combined two transactions into one, in that the member must make a purchase and at also agree to find new buyers. In addition, the member can make profits at someone else's expense. In India the key accused in Chennai was arrested. In 2014, Mumbai police froze the bank account of Danesh Irani after it was alleged that he had received lakhs of rupees. In February 2014, the Managing Director Pushpam Appalanaidu of Questnet India was arrested on 21 cases of cheating. Lookout notices against Eswaran and his business associates Dev Wadhwani and Sachin Gupta were issued. Qnet claimed that Wadhwani and Gupta were independent representatives and not employed by the company at any of their offices. Qnet advocated for the regulation of Indian multilevel marketing companies and for banning pyramid schemes. The Qnet office in Bangalore was shuttered. The bank account belonging to a PR firm dealing with Qnet was frozen. A radio announcer who had held training sessions to attract investors to Qnet was arrested in Mumbai. In October 2014, Mumbai Economic Offenses Wing sent notices to Café Coffee Day to not allow Qnet representatives to hold meetings at their outlets. In 2014 the Economic Offences Wing (EOW) of the Mumbai Police filed a First Information Report against Qnet and its Indian subsidiary Vihaan and barred them from holding workshops and training sessions.

Three independent representatives of Qnet were arrested in January 2015. In March two senior Qnet IRs were arrested. Four Qnet associates were arrested at Vijayawada. Fifteen lakh were seized. In July the Mumbai Police started a probe into an alleged deal with Wizcraft International Entertainment Pvt. Ltd that linked the International Indian Film Academy Awards and Qnet.

In Mali Qnet was accused of tricking people to join Qnet, even though most lost money. In Russia Quest International had an annual turnover of 1.65 billion pounds. To join Qnet IR's had to buy 60,000 roubles worth of company products and then recruit two others who do the same. For every two recruits, the recruiter receives $250. Only 14% of those in the pyramid got their 60,000 rubles. The company partnered with former professional tennis player Martina Hingis in September 2015 and announced her as a Brand Ambassador. Qnet announced the liquidation of its office in Tajikistan on March 18, 2015, continuing its activities through a local company amidst accusations.

=== 2016 ===
In March Mumbai police issued summons to a top official of FC Goa to inquire about their sponsorship by Qnet. In June 2016 Delhi moved against Vihaan Direct Selling and three independent representatives for fraudulently operating a MLM scheme. Hyderabad police arrested four Qnet associates in September. Mumbai Police recovered 144 crore by freezing bank accounts. After a three-year probe, they filed a 55,000-page charge sheet against Vihaan directors and shareholders, which was Qnet's master franchise in India. The Securities and Exchange Board of India advised victims to file complaints with appropriate authorities. The Federation of Direct Selling Association rejected Vihaan's application, stating that Vihaan was in the recruitment business rather than retailing. It claimed that recruiting revenues were so large because recruiting rather than selling was the focus.

In April 2014, Baku, Azerbaijan opened a criminal fraud case against Questnet. In 2012 and 2013, Questnet employees had taken money totaling more than 27 thousand Azerbaijani manat from 16 residents. In December 2016, two Questnet employees were sentenced to eight years in prison for defrauding some 15 citizens of over $65,000.

In Moldova, a once-closed fraud case was reopened based on numerous complaints. Hundreds of Moldovans, eager to get rich overnight, went bankrupt after they were convinced by friends and relatives to join Qnet. They were promised thousands of Euros per week, but had to first buy at least $2000 of goods from the company. The newcomersfurther had to convince two more people to buy $2000 from Qnet to get a commission of $250.

An IR in Dédougou, Burkina Faso was prosecuted for fraud totaling 390,000 West African CFA franc of membership fees. Hundreds of complaints were received. Each IR paid 450,000 CFA as member fees. Project officials were arrested and detained in Ziniare Prison and Correction Center.

Young people in Damascus were recruited by friends to join and pay the membership fee. They are given products to sell and taught to recruit others. Recruiters earn $200 for each pair of recruits.

Sri Lanka shut down Goldquest and QI. They were replaced by Global Lifestyle Lanka Ltd. Managing Director Selvarajan Wijayaratnam, Eswaran's brother-in-law and several board members were summoned. A former defence official was probed for allegedly receiving money to prevent Eswaran's arrest. In Jaffna thousands of people protested for refunds. A court there issued an interim injunction. The magistrate ordered a public awareness campaign and instructed Gram Sevakas to conduct awareness meetings.

=== 2017 ===
In Saudi Arabia, network marketing was banned after complaints about companies including Tvi and Qnet.

Many Georgians took credits from commercial banks to buy Qnet products ranging from $500-$3,000 and claimed that they were defrauded.

The Central Investigation Bureau of Nepal in June, arrested 102 Qnet IRs on fraud charges. Some IRs received had as much as Rs 1 million.

The Jijel province of Algeria dismantled Qnet's network, alleging that recruits were promised trips abroad. 15 women suspected to belong to Qnet were arrested in Annaba State. In Mostaganem three IRs were arrested.

Indonesia included Qnet on its list of bogus companies. Four Qnet IRs were arrested for the murder of a Go-Car driver. Qnet claimed that the company was not involved. In July 2017, at least 19 teenagers who had joined Qnet were evacuated from a shelter in Simo, Boyolali Regency, Central Java and returned to their parents. They had been attempting to sell worthless products such as Chakra for Rp 8 million. Similar cases of alleged fraud occurred in Sambi district. Police raided a rented house in Gentan, Sukoharjo Regency, Central Java finding 20 men and 4 women. Two of their leaders were questioned by the police. In Jambi City, Jambi the police detained 48 Qnet members for disturbing neighbors. Dozens of youth were recruited in Kartasura, Sukoharjo Regency.

In Maharashtra a Court stated that Qnet operations were not legal. In February Delhi High Court, dismissed a petition to quash a First Information Report describing Qnet as a scam. In March forty-seven IRs were arrested and multiple bank accounts were frozen. In April the Enforcement Directorate provisionally seized Qnet properties worth over 150 crore. In May, the Economic Offences Wing Mumbai announced that a unit would be formed to compensate Qnet investors pending a court order. IRs were arrested in Kerala, Thiruvananthapuram, Meerut and Kochi. Complaints were lodged in Hyderabad, Madhapur and Mumbai.

In February, 2017 the Karnataka High Court quashed criminal proceedings against QNet executive Naresh Balasubramaniam in a cybercrime case over alleged fraud. In March, 2017 the Supreme Court of India stayed further proceedings in all the 19 FIR's filed against Qnet and its stake holders across the country and granted bail to Michael Ferreira, former world champion in billiards, and another official of the firm's India franchise in a cheating case.

In Fardis Iran eight Qnet IRs were arrested for counterfeiting and fraud.

France 24 television investigated Questnet.

More than 100 youth from Togo were taken hostage under the banner of Qnet in Côte d'Ivoire.

Four Qnet IRs were arrested for allegedly recruiting 580 youth in Kumasi Ghana. The recruits were asked to pay 3,100 Ghanaian Cedi.

In Sri Lanka three Qnet-related schemes were investigated. The company was ordered to stop its activities.

=== 2018 ===
Latvia television reported that QN Europe was a pyramid scheme. The Ministry of Economy of Lebanon warned the public about Qnet. In Mail following a violent protest, 10 IRs were arrested for fraud. New members paid 400 to 6,000,000 CFA. Malian spiritual guide, Chérif Ousmane Madani Haïdara stated that none of Qnet's medical products, had any effect and denied involvement with them. In Indonesia, Qnet operated in Boyolali, Simo, Banyudono, Mojosongo, Andong and Ngemplak, and in Teras District. Three IRs in Lamongan reported losses of Rp 76 million to investment company Pt Amoeba International that used the Qnet logo. Action was taken against Qnet in Chennai, Andhra Pradesh, Nagpur, Mumbai, Maharashtra, Karnataka and Kanchipuram.

In Guinea, action was taken against Qnet in Labe and Dixinn. In Saudi Arabia Qnet IRs were arrested in Mecca, Riyadh and Najran. In Ivory Coast Qnet IRs were arrested in San-Pédro. Complaints led Turkey to list Qnet as one of 19 pyramid companies. The Georgia Qnet office is managed by parliamentarian Eka Beselia's family. Thousands of people who joined the Qnet network lost money invested in the company. The Fatwa Committee of Kurdistan Iraq, issued a statement denouncing the activity of Qnet as haram. In Senegal Qnet recruited 108,000 members charging between 500 and 700 dollars. The official who issued document of official recognition to Qnet was arrested. In Ghana Qnet claimed that its network employs 10,000 people who earn between 1,000 and 10,000 dollars per month. In Gambia IRs were arrested. In Kazakhstan Qnet was accused of making false promises.

=== 2019 ===
In India Qnet faced legal action and/or arrests in Kukatpally, Cyberabad, Bangalore, Hyderabad, Goa, Rajasthan, Telangana and Powai. Cyberabad police began investigation of the suicide of a former techie owing to alleged losses suffered after investing Indian Rupee 25 Lakh in Qnet Ponzi scheme. He had enrolled six members and was under extreme pressure to enroll more members, his family claimed. The police have written to several investigating agencies including Reserve Bank of India, Enforcement Directorate, Income Tax Department, Serious Fraud Investigation Office, Registrar of Companies, India about how the firm was running Ponzi schemes and have created thousands of investors across the country. A man in Chennai committed suicide after being tricked to invest INR 8 Lakhs in Qnet multi level marketing company by his cousin. A software engineer in Navi Mumbai allegedly committed suicide although his brother refuted his friends claims that he was depressed following losses from an investment of INR 2.5 Lakhs in Qnet. The Registrar of Companies in Karnataka had inspected the books of Vihaan Direct Selling Pvt Ltd, a franchise of QNet, and based upon the report, it had filed winding up petition before the National Company Law Tribunal. Ministry of Corporate Affairs official communication stated that Lookout circulars were issued against 12 persons associated with the company as directors or promoters. 70 people were arrested and 38 cases registered against the company in different police stations. People in Odisha had registered a complaint with the Economic Offences Wing against QNet for allegedly cheating them of lakhs of rupees. A former member of QNet who launched his own multi-level marketing firm after he lost 13 lakhs rupees in QNet scheme was arrested by Cyberabad police for running a money circulation scheme. Three persons in Kerala were arrested by Payyanur police after complaint was filed by a person who was asked to invest in the company.

In Indonesia, in Malang in separate incidents, police rescued individuals allegedly held captive by Qnet personnel. Six youths claimed to be victims of QNet multi level marketing business who were promised of job placement with a salary of Rp 3 million per week but first had to deposit an initial capital of Rp 9.5 million per week to join QNet. They revealed that they were taught to recruit at least two downlines in order to reap profits but the money paid to join cannot be withdrawn later. Lumajang Police arrested the director of PT Amoeba International affiliated with PT QNet for running business as a money game system using the pyramid mechanism. New members who joined Qnet were required to find two new members in which each left and right leg of the pyramid will continue to branch off. Lumajang Police Chief explained that in a pyramid scheme, even if there are goods, actual sale of goods is just a cover. Almost 87 percent people lose their money, which is why it is prohibited in many countries. Thousands of people along with dozens of victims of QNet pyramid scheme descended on the roads to support the police chief and the cobra team to investigate the fraud.

Channel 31 (Kazakhstan) reported that in Karaganda region one person had to undergo treatment after joining Qnet. In Conakry, Guinea, 100 people were arrested for involvement with Qnet. In Sierra Leone investigations of Qnet were demanded by IRs claiming they had been defrauded. In Senegal a dozen IRs were arrested along with two company executives. In a public press conference, the Director, National Agency of Financial Investigations in Chad declared Qnet as a criminal enterprise and asked the public to remain vigilant. The pyramid scheme had extorted 91 million Central African CFA franc from vulnerable groups in over 4 years.

Over 100 people from Togo became victim to a big scam called Qnet. They were told by friends that they found jobs in Ghana with a monthly salary of 300,000 CFA franc but were instead made to pay 500,000 CFA franc for training. The victims without knowing the name of the company, sold things, mobilized the money and went into debt, only realizing later that they have joined Qnet against their will. 213 nationals belonging to Mali were found to be victims of a scam network in Abidjan in Ivory Coast where each Malian had paid the sum of 3,00,000 to 20,00,000 CFA franc. In Ghana about 50 foreigners who were employees of Qnet, were deported for not having resident permits. Police in Alborz Province of Iran arrested 13 members of the pyramid company Qnet who were recruiting people where each invested 200 million Iranian rial. They were later sent to prison.

== See also ==
- Qnet Open – a women's tennis tournament sponsored by the company
