= Satish Krishnan =

Malaysian footballer

K. Satish
Personal information
- Full name: Satish a/l Krishnan
- Date of birth: 28 September 1994 (age 32)
- Place of birth: Kuala Selangor, Selangor, Malaysia
- Height: 1.65 m (5 ft 5 in)
- Positions: Forward; midfielder

Team information
- Current team: Petaling Jaya City
- Number: 20

Youth career
- 2012–2013: Selangor U-21

Senior career*
Years	Team	Apps	(Gls)
2014–2015	Selangor	23	(18)
2014	→ Harimau Muda A (loan)	7	(5)
2016	PKNS FC	0	(0)
2016	→ AirAsia (loan)	6	(3)
2017	Selangor	3	(0)
2018–2019	Petaling Jaya City	12	(5)
2020	PDRM	4	(0 Clubs8 = Harini FT  Caps.  = 12 Goals. = 2)
- * Club domestic league appearances and goals as of 26 June 2018

Satish a/l Krishnan (born 28 September 1994) is a Malaysian professional footballer who plays as a forward but can also plays as an attacking midfielder. He's currently plays for Malaysia Super League club Petaling Jaya City FC.

== Club career ==
Born and raised in Kuala Selangor, Satish began his career with Selangor youth team in 2012. In 2014, Satish has been loaned to Malaysia youth team Harimau Muda A.

In 2016, Satish signed one-year contract with PKNS FC. In July 2016, he was loaned to AirAsia FC until end of the season.

On 18 December 2016, Satish returned to Selangor for a second stint after his contract with PKNS FC expired. Satish made his league debut for Selangor in a 5–3 defeat to PKNS FC coming off the bench in Shah Alam Stadium on 4 February 2017.
