= Pedro Henrique (footballer, born 1991) =

Brazilian footballer

Personal information
- Full name: Pedro Henrique de Santana Almeida
- Date of birth: 28 March 1991 (age 35)
- Place of birth: Jequié, Brazil
- Height: 1.88 m (6 ft 2 in)
- Position: Forward

Youth career
- –2008: Vasco Da Gama
- 2008–2009: Internacional

Senior career*
Years	Team	Apps	(Gls)
2008–2009	Internacional B		
2010–2012	Freamunde	27	(5)
2012–2013	Estoril	2	(0)
2013	→ Covilhã (loan)	3	(0)
2014	Galícia	9	(3)
2014–2015	ACS Poli Timișoara	20	(11)
2015	Galícia		
2016–2017	ACS Poli Timișoara	20	(7)
2018	Daejeon Citizen	4	(1)
2019	Petaling Jaya City	9	(2)
2019	Manama Club	1	(1)
2020	Sertãozinho	4	(0)
2021	Gama	2	(0)
2021	CSM Reșița	0	(0)
- * Club domestic league appearances and goals as of 17:23, 30 April 2021 (UTC)

Pedro Henrique de Santana Almeida (born 28 March 1991), known as just Pedro Henrique, is a Brazilian professional footballer who plays as a forward.

== Honours ==
ACS Poli Timișoara

- Liga II: 2014–15
- Cupa Ligii runner-up: 2016–17
