= Joshua Grommen =

Filipino footballer (born 1996)

Personal information
- Full name: Joshua Jake Bulan Grommen
- Date of birth: 10 July 1996 (age 30)
- Place of birth: Brisbane, Australia
- Height: 1.83 m (6 ft 0 in)
- Position: Centre-back

Youth career
- Western Spirit
- 2012–2014: QLD Academy of Sport
- 2014: Brisbane City

Senior career*
Years	Team	Apps	(Gls)
2014–2015	Loyola	20	(0)
2015	Brisbane Roar NPL	4	(0)
2016	Stallion	16	(0)
2016–2017	Western Pride	0	(0)
2017–2018	Ceres–Negros	20	(0)
2018	Davao Aguilas	4	(0)
2019	Petaling Jaya City	8	(0)
2019	Sukhothai	14	(0)
2020	Ceres–Negros	10	(0)
2020	Brisbane City	2	(0)
2021	Sukhothai	14	(0)
2021–2024	Khon Kaen United	63	(1)
2024	Uthai Thani	5	(0)
Total		180	(1)

International career
2017	Philippines U22	6	(0)
2015–2017	Philippines U23	8	(0)
2024	Philippines	1	(0)
Medal record
Ceres–Negros F.C.
Winner	Philippines Football League	2017
- * Club domestic league appearances and goals

Joshua Jake Bulan Grommen (born 10 July 1996) is a former professional footballer who played as a centre-back. He has represented the Philippines internationally at youth and senior levels.

== Early life ==
Grommen was born in Brisbane, Australia to a Dutch father Rudy Grommen, and a Filipino mother Alma Bulan.

== Career ==
=== Club ===
Joshua Grommen attended the Queensland Academy of Sport and was part of Brisbane Roar's National Youth League team. At age 18, Grommen moved to the Philippines due to limited playing opportunities in Australia to play for clubs including Loyola Meralco, Stallion, Ceres-Negros, and Davao Aguilas. Grommen joined Loyola Meralco of the now-defunct United Football League (UFL) in 2014 but left the club paying out his contract after getting an offer to play for Brisbane Roar. He returned to the UFL in 2015 with Stallion signing him in for the 2016 season.

He had a brief stint with Western Pride back in Australia. He joined Pride in October 2017 and made a bid to join the club's first team. After just two pre-season trial matches he left the club in January 2017 to join Ceres which were then still playing in the UFL for a chance to play in the AFC Cup. The club later won the zonal championships of the 2017 AFC Cup. He remained part of Ceres, which renamed as Ceres-Negros F.C., when the club moved to the Philippines Football League (PFL).

For the 2018 PFL season, Grommen joined the Davao Aguilas which later become defunct by the end of the season.

In early 2019, Grommen moved to Petaling Jaya City of the Malaysia Super League. He later became a free agent but through connections with fellow Filipino-Australian player Iain Ramsay managed to secure a move to Sukhothai of Thai League 1.

Grommen rejoined Ceres–Negros for the 2020 season. On 11 February, he started in Ceres' first AFC Cup group match against Cambodian champions Svay Rieng. He scored Ceres' second goal in the 14th minute, converting Stephan Schröck's cross with what looked like a header. Replays showed that Grommen used his hand to score, yet the goal was still counted in the 4–0 win for Ceres, as the referee and his assistants failed to notice the incident. In March, football tournaments in the Philippines and Asia were either suspended or cancelled due to COVID-19. Grommen then left Ceres–Negros in June and returned to Australia.

In August 2020, National Premier Leagues Queensland side Brisbane City announced that they have signed in Grommen. He made two league appearances for the team that season.

Sukhothai announced Grommen's return on 6 January 2021.

=== International ===
Grommen has played for the Philippine national youth team. He played for the Philippines in the 2016 AFC U-23 Championship qualifiers.

=== Retirement ===
On 7 December 2024, Grommen announced his retirement from football.

== Career statistics ==
=== Club ===
Appearances and goals by club, season and competition
Club	Season	League			Cup		Continental		Other		Total	
Club	Season	Division	Apps	Goals	Apps	Goals	Apps	Goals	Apps	Goals	Apps	Goals
Brisbane Roar Reserves	2015	NPL Queensland	4	0	0	0	–		0	0	4	0
Ceres–Negros	2017	Philippines Football League	11	?	?	?	1 (Note: Appearances in the AFC Cup)	0	1 (Note: Appearances in the Singapore Cup)	0	11	0
Davao Aguilas	2018	Philippines Football League	14	0	?	?	–		0	0	14	0
Career total			29	0	0	0	1	0	1	0	11	0
