= Ganiesh Gunasegaran =

Malaysian footballer

G. Ganiesh
Personal information
- Full name: Ganiesh a/l Gunasegaran
- Date of birth: 26 June 1995 (age 31)
- Place of birth: Perak, Malaysia
- Position: Defender

Team information
- Current team: Petaling Jaya City
- Number: 6

Youth career
- 2016: Perak

Senior career*
Years	Team	Apps	(Gls)
2017–2018	PKNP	10	(0)
2018–	Petaling Jaya City	5	(0)
- * Club domestic league appearances and goals as of 16 February 2019

Ganiesh a/l Gunasegaran (born 26 June 1995) is a Malaysian footballer who plays for Petaling Jaya City FC as a defender.
