= Elizeu (footballer, born 1989) =

Brazilian footballer

Personal information
- Full name: Elizeu Araújo de Melo Batista
- Date of birth: 28 May 1989 (age 37)
- Place of birth: Recife, Brazil
- Height: 1.84 m (6 ft 1/2 in)
- Position: Center back

Team information
- Current team: Petaling Jaya City
- Number: 5

Youth career
- –2009: Sport

Senior career*
Years	Team	Apps	(Gls)
2009	Sport	1	(0)
2010	Internacional B	0	(0)
2010	→ Mirassol (loan)	2	(0)
2010	Botafogo	1	(0)
2011	Palmeiras B	2	(0)
2011–2012	Nacional	11	(1)
2012–2013	Estoril Praia	2	(0)
2013	Vitória	6	(0)
2014	Ponte Preta	3	(0)
2015	Comercial	8	(0)
2016	CSA	2	(0)
2017	Suphanburi	14	(2)
2018–2020	Petaling Jaya City	17	(2)
- * Club domestic league appearances and goals as of 26 June 2018

Elizeu Araújo de Melo Batista (born 28 May 1989), commonly known as Elizeu, is a Brazilian professional footballer who plays as a right back for Malaysian club Petaling Jaya City FC.

== Career ==
He played in the Internacional B.

=== Career statistics ===
(Correct as of October 16, 2010)

Club	Season	State League		Brazilian Série A		Copa do Brasil		Copa Libertadores		Copa Sudamericana		Total	
Club	Season	Apps	Goals	Apps	Goals	Apps	Goals	Apps	Goals	Apps	Goals	Apps	Goals
Botafogo	2010	-	-	0	0	-	-	-	-	-	-	0	0
Total		-	-	0	0	-	-	-	-	-	-	0	0
