= Vijay Eswaran =

Malaysian businessman

Yang Hormat Dato' Sri Vijay Eswaran SSAP DPMP DIMP
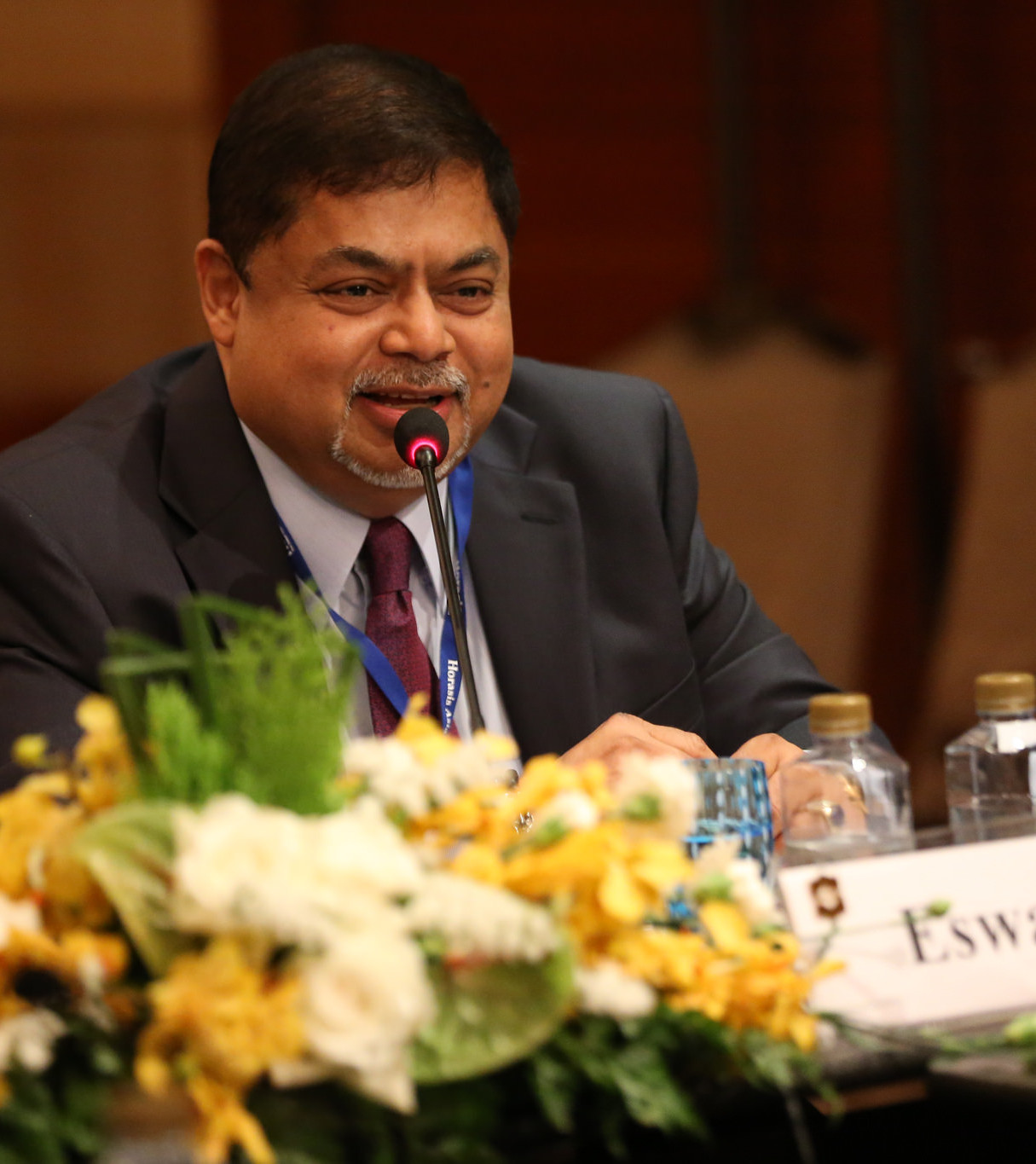
- Horasis Asia Meeting 2016, Bangkok, 26–27 November
- Born: 7 October 1960 (age 65); Penang, Malaysia
- Occupation: Executive Chairman
- Spouse: Umayal Eswaran
- Parent(s): Vijayaratnam Eswaran; Pushpavathy Chinnaiah
- Website: Vijay Eswaran

Vijay Eswaran (born 7 October 1960) is a Malaysian businessman and the executive chairman of the QI Group, headquartered in Hong Kong.

== Early life ==
Eswaran was born in Penang, Malaysia to Penangite Indian parents of minority Ceylonese Tamil descent, namely Pushpavathy Chinnaiah, a teacher and Vijayaratnam Saravanamuthu, founder of the Malaysian Hindu Youth Organisation.

Eswaran financed his tertiary education in the UK by working as a cab driver. After graduating with a degree in socio-economics from LSE (London School of Economics) in 1984, he traveled around Europe for a year, where he did a series of odd jobs. During his travels he spent over a month in a Franciscan monastery, where he took a 33-day vow of silence. In 1985, he returned to the UK, where he learned about binary system marketing and obtained professional qualification from CIMA (Chartered Institute of Management Accountants). In 1986 he traveled to the US where he obtained an MBA from the Southern Illinois University in 1986. He was involved in multilevel marketing (MLM) on a part-time basis while working for Systematics, a subsidiary of IBM.

When he returned to Malaysia after 13 years, he sold for Cosway Group to start its Philippines business, after which he began moving into the direct selling industry.

== Career ==
In 1998, after his return to Asia, he co-founded a direct selling company that grew and expand into QI Group, an e-commerce based conglomerate with businesses in travel, media, telecommunications, luxury products, wellness, training, and corporate investments. QI Group has regional offices in Hong Kong, Singapore, Thailand and Malaysia and a presence in nearly 10 countries through a wide range of subsidiary companies.

== Books ==
- In the Sphere of Silence (2005)
- In the Thinking Zone (2010)
- 18 Stepping Stones (2011)
- On the Wings of Thought (2011)
- Two Minutes from the Abyss (2016)

== Controversies ==
In May 2007 a dispute in Manila, Philippines filed by two former partners of the original founding team escalated to an alleged 'offence' leading to an Interpol Red alert listing the four directors. Interpol put out a warrant for their arrest and the case was fought out substantially in the courts of Manila and Jakarta. The Goldquest executives had asked the Philippines Supreme Court to stop the Quezeon City Regional Court trial pending resolution of a petition for review. After three weeks, Indonesian courts released Vijay Eswaran; a Manila court dismissed the charge soon afterward.

As per the order of the Supreme Court, the FIRs are being stayed on the grounds mentioned in the Writ Petition. The petition claims that the business model followed by Vihaan Direct Selling (India) Pvt. Ltd is not a money circulation scheme as alleged, and does not fall under the purview of the Prize Chits and Money Circulation (Banning) Act 1978. The petition further states that the business of Vihaan is compliant with all legal requirements of conducting business in India.

A 2003 charge against Gold Quest for its fraudulent activities in Chennai, India, reached the Supreme Court, which in 2014 allowed the quashing of the proceedings. The Supreme Court appointed a one-man commission, a retired Judge of the Madras High Court, to settle all legitimate claims of around 200 depositors.

In 2009 money circulation charges were brought against Gold Quest by Tamil Nadu police. The Chennai Enforcement Directorate, attached Gold Quest properties worth 150 crore to the case under Prevention of Money Laundering Act. There was a Red Corner notice issued for Eswaran's arrest. In an interview about the charges, Vijay Eswaran denied any wrongdoing. Qnet has also stated that Vijay Eswaran is neither director nor shareholder of Qnet's franchise in India (Vihaan Direct Selling Pvt. Ltd.).

In August 2013, Times of India reported that Vijay Eswaran was being investigated by the Economic Offences wing in regards to Qnet, which he founded. The Economic Offences Wing issued lookout notice against Eswaran and a few others, after he failed to appear before the authorities for questioning. Police froze six of Qnet's bank accounts in the country. QNet denied the allegations fully, stating that its operations are legal, compliant and transparent.

In 2014 the Enforcement Directorate in 2014 accused Vijay Eswaran of money laundering, along with his company, Qnet. This allegation has been denied by both the company QNet and Vijay Eswaran.

In 2016, after 3 years of investigation, the Economic Offences Wing of the Mumbai Police issued lookout notices against 30 people in connection with the Qnet controversy. As founder of Qnet, Vijay Eswaran was featured as the key defendant of the case.

In February 2018 Qnet was prosecuted for fraud and forgery at trial court of Labe, Somalia, but the proceedings were later halted, and charges dropped.

== Personal life ==
He is married to Umayal Eswaran who is the Chairperson of the Vijayaratnam Foundation, which is CSR initiatives of the QI Group.

== Honours ==
- Pahang
  - Knight Companion of the Order of the Crown of Pahang (DIMP) – Dato' (2006)
  - Grand Knight of the Order of Sultan Ahmad Shah of Pahang (SSAP) – Dato' Sri (2012)
- Perak
  - Knight Commander of the Order of the Perak State Crown (DPMP) – Dato' (2012)
