= Bae Beom-geun =

South Korean-Malaysian footballer

Personal information
- Full name: Bae Beom-geun
- Date of birth: 4 March 1993 (age 33)
- Place of birth: South Korea
- Height: 1.86 m (6 ft 1 in)
- Position: Midfielder

Team information
- Current team: Khujand
- Number: 7

Youth career
- 2009–2012: Daejeon Citizen
- 2013: Honam University
- 2013–2014: Hanzhong University

Senior career*
Years	Team	Apps	(Gls)
2015	Eisbachtal	11	(1)
2015–2016	Shkupi	8	(1)
2017	Armed Forces	22	(5)
2018	Petaling Jaya City	27	(5)
2019	Petaling Jaya City	26	(2)
2020	Sereď	4	(0)
2021	Negeri Sembilan	22	(1)
2022	Gyeongnam	1	(0)
2023	Khujand	13	(1)
- * Club domestic league appearances and goals as of 20:54, 20 February 2024 (UTC)

Bae Beom-geun (Korean: 배범근; born 4 March 1993) is a South Korean-born Malaysian retired professional footballer who last played as a midfielder for Tajikistan Higher League club Khujand.

== Career ==
=== Club ===
On 27 February 2023, Tajikistan Higher League club Khujand announced the signing of Bae.
