= Thivandaran Karnan =

Malaysian football player

K. Thivandaran
Personal information
- Full name: Thivandaran a/l Karnan
- Date of birth: 8 March 1999 (age 27)
- Place of birth: Penang, Malaysia
- Height: 1.71 m (5 ft 7 in)
- Position: Central midfielder

Youth career
- Frenz United
- 2017–2018: Penang U21

Senior career*
Years	Team	Apps	(Gls)
2017–2018	Penang	12	(0)
2019–2021	Petaling Jaya City	27	(0)
2022	Penang		
2023	Melaka		
2024–2025	Bunga Raya Damansara		

International career
2017–2018	Malaysia U19	9	(0)
2019–2021	Malaysia U22	2	(0)
2017	Malaysia U23		
Medal record
Men's football
Representing Malaysia
AFF U-19 Youth Championship
Winner	2018 Indonesia
- * Club domestic league appearances and goals

Thivandaran a/l Karnan (born 8 March 1999) is a Malaysian professional footballer who plays as a central midfielder.

== Club career ==
=== Petaling Jaya City ===
On 2 March 2019, Thivandaran made his debut for Petaling Jaya City in a 0–1 defeat to Felda United.

== International career ==
Thivandaran represented Malaysian at various youth levels. He was named in the Malaysia under 19 squad for 2018 AFF U-19 Youth Championship in the Indonesia. He has played in the final against Myanmar which Malaysia win 4–3.

== Honours ==
Malaysia U19

- AFF U-19 Youth Championship: 2018
