= Pedro Henrique (footballer, born January 1992) =

East Timorese footballer

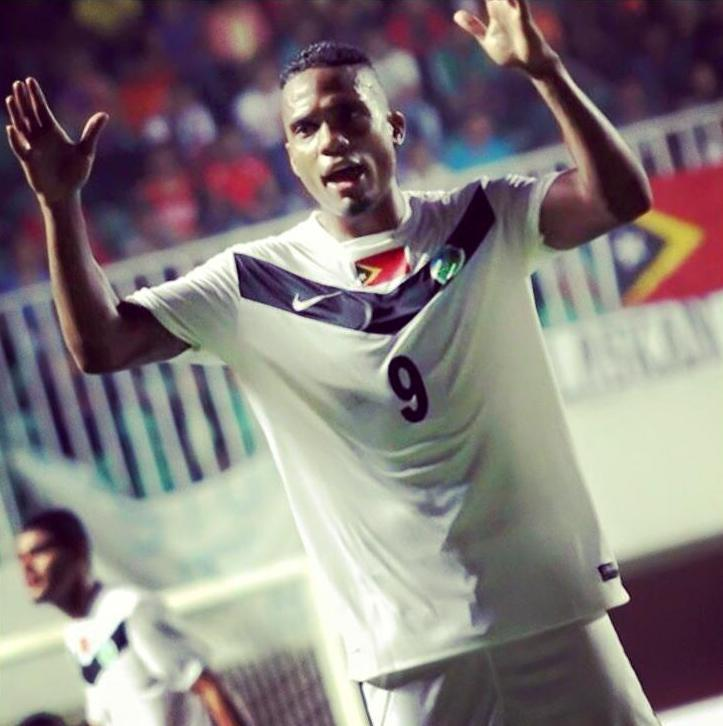
- Henrique playing for Timor-Leste in 2013

Personal information
- Full name: Pedro Henrique Cortes Oliveira Góis
- Date of birth: 17 January 1992 (age 34)
- Place of birth: São Paulo, Brazil
- Height: 1.82 m (6 ft 0 in)
- Position: Forward

Team information
- Current team: Police Tero
- Number: 9

Youth career
- 2005–2007: Sao Paulo
- 2008: Rio Claro
- 2009: Gremio

Senior career*
Years	Team	Apps	(Gls)
2010–2011	Mogi Mirim	9	(3)
2011–2012	Uberaba	0	(0)
2013	Santacruzense	3	(0)
2013	Petrolina Social	12	(2)
2014	Al-Mesaimeer	20	(9)
2015	Al-Oruba	12	(9)
2015	PKNS	15	(10)
2016	Air Force Central	8	(6)
2016	Sepahan	7	(0)
2017	Daejeon Citizen	0	(0)
2017	Hamrun Spartans	4	(1)
2018	Victory	6	(4)
2018	Samut Sakhon	0	(0)
2019	Pelating Jaya City	10	(4)
2019–2020	Sheikh Russel	3	(1)
2020	Sagrada Esperança	2	(1)
2021	Sri Pahang	10	(1)
2022	Navy	8	(1)
2022	Madura United	15	(2)
2023	Persikabo 1973	12	(7)
2023–2025	Kuching City	21	(4)
2025	Sergipe	5	(2)
2025	Itabaiana	4	(0)
2025	Pattaya United	16	(9)
2025–	Police Tero	19	(5)

International career
2013–2016	Timor-Leste U23	5	(3)
- * Club domestic league appearances and goals as of 18 May 2026

Pedro Henrique Cortes Oliveira Góis (born 17 January 1992) is a professional footballer who plays as a forward for Thai League 2 side Police Tero. Born in Brazil, he represented East Timor at youth level.

== Club career ==
=== Youth career ===
Born and raised in São Paulo, Brazil, Pedro began his career as a football player in 2004 with Brazilian top club, São Paulo where he played for the next three years. In 2008, he moved to Rio Claro-based Rio Claro Futebol Clube and in 2009 he played for another Brazilian top club, Porto Alegre-based Grêmio Foot-Ball Porto Alegrense.

=== Mogi Mirim ===
In 2010, he began his professional footballing career with Mogi Mirim-based Mogi Mirim Esporte Clube. He scored 9 goals in 3 appearances in the 2011 Campeonato Paulista for the Mogi Mirim-based club.

=== Uberaba ===
In 2011, he moved to Uberaba-based Campeonato Mineiro club, Uberaba Sport Club. He made a substitute appearance for the club in the 2011 Campeonato Mineiro on 13 February 2011 in a 2–1 win over Guarani Esporte Clube. He also made a substitute appearance in the 2011 Copa do Brasil on 17 February 2011 in the First Phase in a 3–1 win over Santa Helena Esporte Clube.

=== Santacruzense ===
On 1 February 2013, he signed a two-month contract with Santa Cruz do Rio Pardo-based Campeonato Paulista Série A2 club, Associação Esportiva Santacruzense. He made his debut for the Santa Cruz do Rio Pardo-based club in a 2013 Campeonato Paulista Série A2 match on 24 February 2013 in a 2–1 loss against Associação Esportiva Velo Clube Rioclarense. He also made appearances in a 4–0 loss against Grêmio Osasco Audax Esporte Clube and a 2–1 loss against São Carlos Clube. He made 3 appearances in the 2013 Campeonato Paulista Série A2.

=== Petrolina Social ===
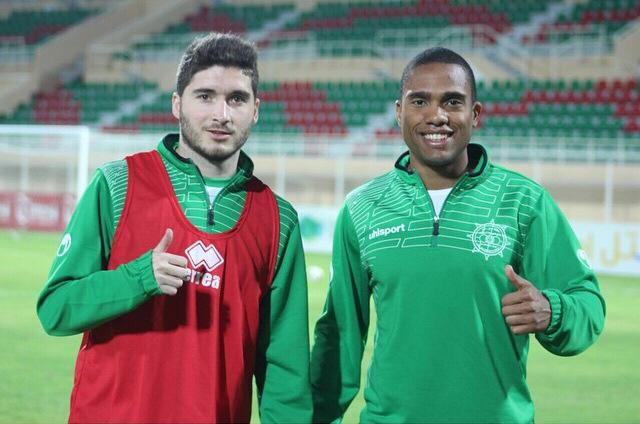
Pedro Henrique Oliveira and Ángel Carrascosa Muñoz - Al-Oruba SC

On 10 March 2013, he signed a two-month contract with Petrolina-based Campeonato Pernambucano club, Petrolina Social Futebol Clube. He made his debut for the Petrolina-based club on 14 March 2013 in a 2013 Campeonato Pernambucano match in 0–0 draw against Sport Club do Recife and scored his first goal on 31 March 2013 in a 1–1 draw against Belo Jardim Futebol Clube. He made 12 appearances and scored 2 goals in the 2013 Campeonato Pernambucano.

=== Al-Mesaimeer ===
He first moved out of Brazil in 2014 to the Middle East and more accurately to Qatar where he signed a one-year contract with Qatargas League club, Mesaimeer. He scored 9 goals in 12 appearances in the 2014–15 Qatar Second Division League finishing as the top scorer at the end of the mid-season.

=== Al-Oruba ===
On 28 January 2013, he signed a six-month contract with Oman Professional League club, Al-Oruba. He made his debut on 5 February 2015 in a 1–0 win over fierce rivals Sur, in a match that is also known as the Sur Derby. He made 6 appearances in the 2014–15 Oman Professional League for the Sur-based club.

=== PKNS ===
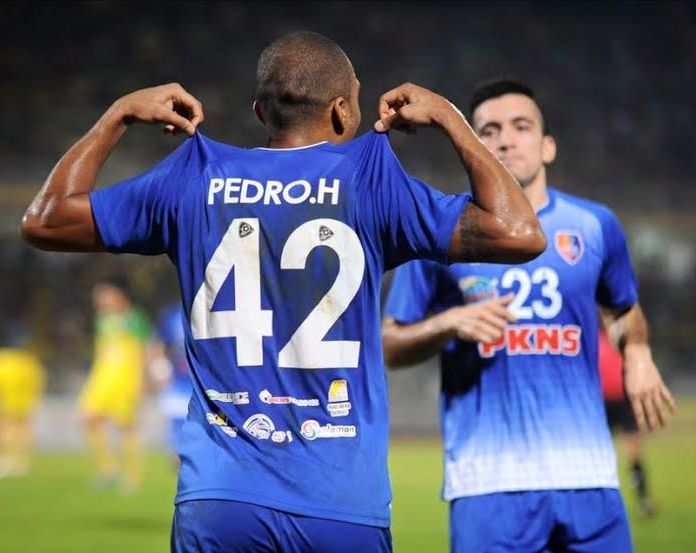
Pedro Henrique Oliveira - 2015 Malaysia Premier League

He scored 8 goals in 13 appearances in the 2015 Malaysia Premier League.

== International career ==
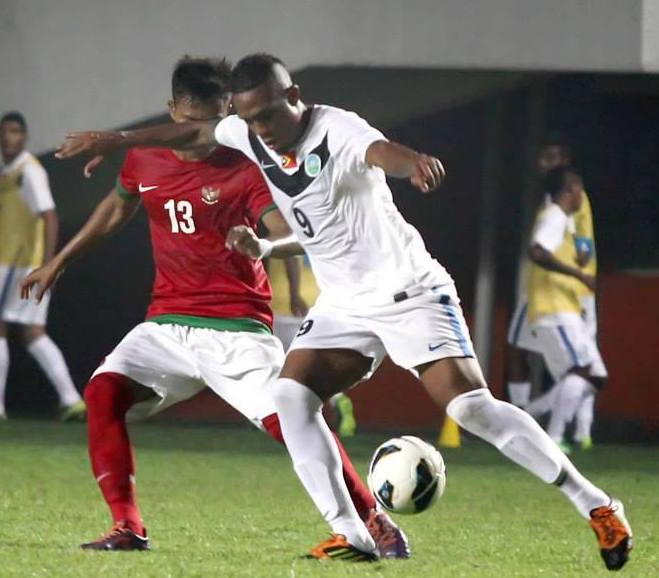
Pedro at the 2013 Southeast Asian Games

Pedro started his career with Timor-Leste national under-23 football team in 2013 at the 2013 Southeast Asian Games. He made his debut for the U-23 side in a 3–1 loss against Thailand U-23 and scored his first goal in a 3–2 win over Cambodia U-23. He also made appearances in a 3–1 loss against Myanmar U-23 and in a 0–0 draw against Indonesia U-23.

== Career statistics ==
Appearances and goals by club, season and competition
Club	Season	League			Cup		Continental		Other		Total	
Club	Season	Division	Apps	Goals	Apps	Goals	Apps	Goals	Apps	Goals	Apps	Goals
Mogi Mirim	2006	Campeonato Paulista	9	3	0	0	0	0	0	0	9	3
Uberaba	2011	Campeonato Mineiro	0	0	0	0	0	0	0	0	0	0
Santacruzense	2013	Campeonato Paulista Série A2	3	0	0	0	0	0	0	0	3	0
Petrolina Social	2013	2013 Campeonato Pernambucano	12	2	0	0	0	0	0	0	12	2
Al-Mesaimeer	2014–15	Qatargas League	12	9	0	0	0	0	0	0	12	9
Al-Oruba	2014–15	Oman Professional League	6	0	0	0	0	0	0	0	6	0
PKNS	2015	Malaysia Premier League	13	8	0	0	0	0	0	0	13	8
Sepahan	2016–17	Persian Gulf Pro League	6	0	2	1	0	0	0	0	8	1
Police Tero	2025–26	Thai League 2	0	0	0	0	0	0	0	0	0	0
Career total			61	22	2	1	0	0	0	0	63	23
