= Washington Brandão =

Brazilian footballer

Personal information
- Full name: Washington Brandão dos Santos
- Date of birth: 18 August 1990 (age 36)
- Place of birth: Brasília, Brazil
- Height: 1.83 m (6 ft 0 in)
- Position: Forward

Team information
- Current team: Prime Bangkok (on loan from Police Tero)
- Number: 70

Youth career
- 2010–2012: Sociedade Esportiva do Gama

Senior career*
Years	Team	Apps	(Gls)
2012–2014	Araguaína	6	(2)
2014	Esportivo	10	(4)
2014–2016	HB Køge	44	(10)
2016–2019	Vendsyssel FF	65	(4)
2017	→ Passo Fundo (loan)	10	(1)
2019	Persela Lamongan	0	(0)
2019–2020	Petaling Jaya City	22	(8)
2021–2023	Hoang Anh Gia Lai	53	(7)
2023–2024	Abahani Limited Dhaka	14	(4)
2024	Kelantan Darul Naim	7	(1)
2025	Hoang Anh Gia Lai	16	(7)
2025	Pattaya United	17	(3)
2025–	Police Tero	0	(0)
2026	→ Prime Bangkok (loan)	15	(9)
- * Club domestic league appearances and goals as of 18 May 2026

Washington Brandão dos Santos (born 18 August 1990) is a Brazilian professional footballer who plays as a forward for Thai League 3 club Prime Bangkok, on loan from Police Tero.

== Career ==
=== HB Køge ===
On 30 June 2014, Brandão signed a two-year contract with Danish 1st Division club HB Køge after a successful trial. He made his debut on 25 July, scoring after only six minutes in a 1–1 draw against Skive IK. During his stint with the club, he made 51 appearances in which he scored 20 goals.

=== Vendsyssel FF ===
Brandão moved to Vendsyssel FF on 22 January 2016, signing a three-year deal. He made his debut on 17 March, coming on as a substitute for Mads Greve in the 73rd minute of a 2–0 league loss to Lyngby Boldklub. On 28 April, Brandão scored his first goal for the club, which also proved to be the winner, in a 1–0 win over Silkeborg IF.

At the end of the 2017–18 season, Brandão helped the team win promotion to the Danish Superliga for the first time.

=== Persela Lamongan ===
In February 2019, Brandão joined Persela Lamongan in Indonesia. He played two games for the club in the Piala Indonesia and four games in the Indonesia President's Cup where he also scored three goals. However, the club was not satisfied with the player. The club decided not to use him for the 2019 Liga 1 season. The club announced in April 2019, that his quality was good but they needed a pure striker and that the coaching staff had recommended him not to continue.

=== Petaling Jaya City ===
Following his departure from Indonesia, Brandão joined Malaysian club Petaling Jaya City.

=== Hoang Anh Gia Lai ===
In 2021, Brandão moved to V.League 1 club Hoang Anh Gia Lai. He had a strong start to the campaign, contributing with two goals in his first eight appearances, and "integrated well" to a team consisting of mostly homegrown Vietnamese players.

=== Abahani Limited Dhaka ===
In October 2023, Brandão signed for Bangladesh Premier League club Abahani Limited Dhaka.
