= Yoges Muniandy =

Malaysian association football player

M. Yoges
Personal information
- Full name: Yoges a/l A. Muniandy
- Date of birth: 13 November 1988 (age 38)
- Place of birth: Kedah, Malaysia
- Height: 1.73 m (5 ft 8 in)
- Position: Midfielder

Team information
- Current team: Penang
- Number: 88

Senior career*
Years	Team	Apps	(Gls)
2016–2018	MISC-MIFA	23	(2)
2019	Petaling Jaya City	3	(0)
2019	→ Penang (loan)	8	(0)
2020	Penang	0	(0)
- * Club domestic league appearances and goals as of 20 July 2019

Yoges a/l A. Muniandy (born 13 November 1988) is a Malaysian footballer who plays as a midfielder for Penang in the Malaysia Premier League.

== Club career ==
=== MISC-MIFA ===
He help the team to win the 2016 Malaysia FAM Cup with overall scoring 2 goals in the season.

=== Penang (loan) ===
In June 2019, Yoges completed his loan deal to Penang.

== Honours ==
=== Club ===
MISC-MIFA

- Malaysia FAM League: 2016

Penang FA

- Malaysia Premier League: 2020
