= Tinagaran Baskeran =

Malaysian footballer (1991–2023)

B. Tinagaran
Personal information
- Full name: Tinagaran a/l Baskeran
- Date of birth: 2 April 1991
- Place of birth: Penang, Malaysia
- Date of death: 8 May 2023 (aged 32)
- Height: 1.79 m (5 ft 10 in)
- Position: Centre back

Senior career*
Years	Team	Apps	(Gls)
2011–2015	Penang		
2015–2019	Petaling Jaya City	27	(1)
- * Club domestic league appearances and goals

Tinagaran a/l Baskeran (2 April 1991 – 8 May 2023) was a Malaysian professional footballer who played as a centre back.

Tinagaran retired from professional football in November 2019 due to stage 4 bone cancer. He died on 8 May 2023, at the age of 32.
