= 2017 Malaysia FA Cup final =

- The match programme cover
- Event: 2017 Malaysia FA Cup
Pahang	Kedah
(Pahang)	(Kedah)
2	3
- Date: 20 May 2017
- Venue: Shah Alam Stadium, Shah Alam
- Man of the Match: Baddrol Bakhtiar (Kedah)
- Referee: Nagor Amir Noor Mohamed
- Attendance: 78,898
- Weather: Clear

The 2017 Malaysia FA Cup final was the 28th final of the Malaysia FA Cup, the Malaysia football cup competition. Kedah won the cup after defeating Pahang 3–2 and were assured a place for the 2018 AFC Cup group stage.

== Background ==
The final was played on 20 May 2017 at Shah Alam Stadium.

== Route to the final ==
=== Pahang ===
Round	Opposition	Score
First Round	Bye	
Second Round	Johor Darul Ta'zim II (a)	4–2
Third Round	Melaka United (h)	2–0
Quarter-finals	Johor Darul Ta'zim (1st leg) (h)	3–1
Quarter-finals	Johor Darul Ta'zim (2nd leg) (a)	1–2
Semi-final	Negeri Sembilan (1st leg) (h)	1–0
Semi-final	Negeri Sembilan (2nd leg) (a)	2–1
Key: (h) = Home venue; (a) = Away venue.

=== Kedah ===
Round	Opposition	Score
First Round	Bye	
Second Round	Kuala Lumpur (h)	4–2
Third Round	Perak (a)	2–0
Quarter-finals	PKNP (1st leg) (h)	6–1
Quarter-finals	PKNP (2nd leg) (a)	0–1
Semi-final	Terengganu (1st leg) (h)	1–0
Semi-final	Terengganu (2nd leg) (a)	3–0
Key: (h) = Home venue; (a) = Away venue.

== Ticket allocation ==
Each club received an allocation of 72,000 tickets; 32,750 tickets for Pahang, 32,750 tickets for Kedah and 6,500 tickets for purchase online.

== Rules ==
The final was played as a single match. If tied after regulation, extra time and, if necessary, penalty shoot-out would be used to decide the winner.

== Match ==
=== Details ===
20 May 2017
21:00 (UTC+8)

Pahang	2–3	Kedah
Heo Jae-won 45+3'; Sumareh 80'	Report	20' Ken Ilsø; 45+1', 72' Baddrol

Shah Alam Stadium, Shah Alam
Attendance: 78,898
Referee: Nagor Amir Noor Mohamed

Pahang	Kedah

GK	27	(Malaysia) Wan Azraie
RB	2	(Malaysia) Matthew Davies (c)
CB	15	(South Korea) Heo Jae-won
CB	24	(Malaysia) Muslim Ahmad
LB	14	(Malaysia) Faisal Rosli
DM	9	(Malaysia) Kiko Insa	(yellow card) 25' (red card) 32'
RM	26	(The Gambia) Mohamadou Sumareh
CM	11	(Malaysia) Syamim Yahya		(substituted off) 85'
CM	10	(Argentina) Yamil Romero
LM	8	(Malaysia) Wan Zaharulnizam		(substituted off) 78'
CF	29	(Brazil) Matheus Alves
Substitutes:
GK	1	(Malaysia) Helmi Eliza Elias
DF	3	(Malaysia) Saiful Nizam Miswan
DF	19	(Malaysia) Afif Amiruddin
MF	6	(Malaysia) Christie Jayaseelan
MF	17	(Malaysia) Joseph Kalang Tie
MF	20	(Malaysia) Azam Azih		(substituted in) 85'
FW	5	(Malaysia) Ashari Samsudin		(substituted in) 78'
Head Coach:
(Malaysia) Dollah Salleh

GK	25	(Malaysia) Ifwat Akmal
RB	15	(Malaysia) Rizal Ghazali	(yellow card) 73'
CB	13	(Malaysia) Khairul Helmi (c)
CB	2	(Malaysia) Syawal Nordin
LB	3	(Malaysia) Fitri Omar	(yellow card) 61'
RM	7	(Malaysia) Baddrol Bakhtiar		(substituted off) 90'
CM	12	(Malaysia) Akram Mahinan
CM	8	(Kosovo) Liridon Krasniqi	(yellow card) 89'
LM	22	(Malaysia) Syazwan Zainon		(substituted off) 72'
AM	10	(Brazil) Sandro
CF	9	(Denmark) Ken Ilsø		(substituted off) 84'
Substitutes:
GK	21	(Malaysia) Farhan Abu Bakar
DF	17	(Malaysia) Syazwan Tajuddin	(yellow card) 90+4'	(substituted in) 84'
DF	24	(Malaysia) Asri Mardzuki
MF	23	(Malaysia) Hanif Dzahir
MF	33	(Malaysia) Akhyar Abdul Rashid
FW	14	(Malaysia) Fakri Saarani		(substituted in) 90'
FW	20	(Malaysia) Syafiq Ahmad	(yellow card) 79'	(substituted in) 72'
Head Coach:
(Malaysia) Nidzam Adzha

Man of the Match:
Baddrol Bakhtiar (Kedah)

Match rules

- 90 minutes
- 30 minutes of extra time if necessary
- Penalty shoot-out if scores still level
- Seven named substitutes, of which up to three may be used
