= 2017 Kedah FA season =

Kedah
2017 season
- President: Dato' Seri DiRaja Ahmad Bashah Md Hanipah
- Manager: Dato' Jeffrey Low Han Chow
- Head Coach: Tan Cheng Hoe (until 29 April 2017); Muhammad Nidzam Adzha (from 22 May 2017)
- Stadium: Darul Aman Stadium (Capacity: 25,000)
- Super League: 4th
- Charity Shield: Winners
- FA Cup: Winners
- Malaysia Cup: Runners-up
- Top goalscorer: League: Ken Ilsø (15); All: Ken Ilsø (25)
- Highest home attendance: 25,000 vs Sarawak, 27 January 2017 vs Penang, 25 February 2017 vs Melaka United, 4 March 2017
- Lowest home attendance: 3,000 vs Johor Darul Ta'zim, 28 October 2017
- Average home league attendance: 14,693
- Biggest win: 6–1 vs PKNP (H), 1 April 2017
- Biggest defeat: 5–0 vs T–Team (A), 15 April 2017
Home colours	Away colours	Third colours
- All statistics correct as of 28 October 2017.

The 2017 season was Kedah FA's 9th season in the Malaysia Super League since its inception in 2004. They will also eligible to compete in FA Cup and Malaysia Cup.

== Season overview ==
=== Pre-season ===
On 24 November 2016, Azmeer Yusof through his personal Facebook account have confirmed will be with Kuala Lumpur for the 2017 season although Kedah offered him a new contract for another season.

On 28 November 2016, the contract of Liridon Krasniqi was renewed for another two years and is set to expire in the end of 2018 season.

On 1 December 2016, Mohd Fitri Omar was signed from Penang FA and Muhammad Akram Mahinan was signed from Johor Darul Ta'zim Both signed one-year deals with the club.

On 14 December 2016, Fakri Saarani re-joined the club for another season after the end of loan from Felda United.

=== January ===
On 3 January 2017, Ken Ilsø was signed from Home United for a one-year deal with Kedah

On 13 January 2017, Zachary Michael Anderson was announced the last foreign players signed with Kedah

On 20 January 2017, Kedah started the season with a 1–1 draw at Johor Darul Ta'zim with a goal from Baddrol Bakhtiar and winning the Charity Shield for the third time on penalty shootout. Their last Charity Shield victory was in 1991 and 1994.

On 27 January 2017, at their home debut of the season, Baddrol, Sandro and Syazwan gave Kedah a narrow 3–2 victory against Sarawak.

=== February ===
On 4 February 2017, Kedah drew 1–1 at FELDA United with a 1st goal of the season from Ken Ilsø.

On 11 February 2017, Kedah wrested the Super League top spot away from Pahang, after they defeated the Elephants 4–1 at the Darul Aman Stadium on Saturday. Their goals were scored by Baddrol and Farhan, as well as Ken Ilsø's double.

On 14 February 2017, Kedah ease through to 3rd round of FA Cup, defeating Kuala Lumpur 4–2 with a two-goal from Farhan, a goal from Liridon and an own goal.

On 18 February 2017, Baddrol penalty kick gave Kedah the late 0–1 win at Kelantan.

On 25 February 2017, Kedah defeated Penang 3–1 in the first Northern derby, with a goal from Fitri, Syafiq and Liridon.

=== March ===
On 1 March 2017, Kedah drew at Selangor 1–1 with a free kick goal from Sandro.

On 4 March 2017, two goals from Ken Ilsø and Sandro secured Kedah a 4–0 win over Melaka United.

On 11 March 2017, Kedah defeated Perak TBG 2–0 in the round of 16 match in the FA Cup, with a goals from Anderson and Ken Ilsø. Kedah moved to the next round.

=== April ===
On 1 April 2017, the FA Cup got underway with a 6–1 win over PKNP, Kedah gave PKNP no chance in the first leg FA Cup quarter-final match, with doubles from Ken Ilsø, a free-kick from Fitri, a penalty from Liridon, a wonder strike from Syafiq and another own goal.

On 8 April 2017, a goal from Anderson was not enough in a 1–1 draw against PKNS.

On 15 April 2017, Kedah lost their first game in this years league campaign at T–Team 5–0. The biggest defeat for this season so far.

On 21 April 2017, Kedah lost their second straight game with a 1–0 loss at PKNP in the second leg of the FA Cup quarter-final, but still made it through to the semi-final with (6–2 win on aggregate).

On 26 April 2017, a wonderful direct free kick goal from Baddrol gave Kedah a 1–1 draw against Perak TBG.

On 30 April 2017, youngster Farhan emerged Kedah's hero in their first leg FA Cup semi-final match against Terengganu, when he scored the only goal of the match. Kedah won 1–0

=== May ===
On 9 May 2017, Kedah drew 4–4 at PKNS, with two goals from Syafiq, a goal from Ken Ilsø and penalty from Sandro.

On 13 May 2017, Kedah are through to their third cup final match in three years, after they defeated Terengganu 3–0 in their second leg FA Cup semi-final match, to take the tie 4–0 on aggregate. All three imports scored the goals Liridon, Ken Ilsø and Sandro.

On 20 May 2017, Kedah won the 2017 Malaysia FA Cup, defeating Pahang 3–2 with a two-goal from Baddrol and a goal from Ken Ilsø.

On 24 May 2017, Ken Ilsø scored his first hat-trick to help Kedah get a 3–0 home win against T–Team.

=== July ===
On 1 July 2017, Kedah suffered their first home defeat of the season in a thrilling 2–3 loss to Perak TBG. Sandro and Liridon notched the goals for the Red Eagles but they couldn't find enough overturn the result.

On 4 July 2017, 2016 Malaysia Cup champions Kedah recovered from their weekend defeat in the Super League to record a 2–0 win over Melaka United at the Darul Aman Stadium. Sandro gave Kedah the lead in the 29th minute through his volley from outside the Mousedeers' penalty box, and Baddrol doubled their lead in the 64th minute.

On 7 July 2017, Defending champions Kedah maintained their 100% record in the cup, when they trashed UiTM FC 5–0. In the match which was held at the UiTM Stadium, Syafiq opened the scoring as early as the third minute, before Liridon (44'), Ken Ilsø (80'), Sandro (90') and a Faiz Bandong own goal (90+3') compounded the university boys' misery.

On 11 July 2017, Kedah edged Melaka United – coming back twice to not only draw level but to eventually win the game 4–2. It was 2–2 at half time after Marco Simic scored twice but found his side pegged back each time by Baddrol. Akram scored a rare goal to put Kedah ahead before and injury time goal by Asri Mardzuki seal an important victory for Nidzam Adzha's boys. The Red Eagles are now the closest challenger to Johor Darul Ta'zim, sitting on nine points behind the league leaders.

On 15 July 2017, Second-placed Kedah were held to a 1–1 draw at home by Selangor, thanks to some amazing goalkeeping by the Red Giants' Norazlan Razali. Ken Ilsø scored a goal for Kedah.

On 18 July 2017, Morgaro Gomis and Abou Bakr Al-Mel were the toast of the Kelantan after they defeated Kedah 3–1 at Sultan Muhammad IV Stadium in Kota Bharu. Liridon late penalty goal was nothing more than a consolation for the away side.

On 22 July 2017, Second-placed Kedah returned to winning ways, cruising to a comfortable 2–0 win over bottom-placed Penang in the Northern Derby at the State Stadium. The goals were scored by Ken Ilsø (62') and Baddrol (74').

On 26 July 2017, Kedah avenged their 3–1 Malaysia Cup group stage defeat to Kelantan last week, when they hammered the Red Warriors 5–0 at home. They needed only eight minutes to open the scoring, a goal by Syazwan Zainon, but had to wait until the 48th minute for their second through Danish poacher Ken Ilsø, who found the back net once again 12 minutes later. Sandro too scored a brace, in the 71st and 87th minute.

On 29 July 2017, Melaka United went down to their second defeat in the group stage after they shipped six goal to Kedah in a 2–6 loss. Fakri, Sandro (2), Akram and Ken Ilsø all scored for Kedah while Azinee Taib and Fauzi Roslan scored for the home side. However, Akhyar Rashid will grab all the headlines after he notched his first ever goal for Kedah in the rout. The nippy forward is continuing his progress after an encouraging period with the Malaysia national under-22 side.

=== August ===
On 1 August 2017, Kedah recording a slim 1–0 win over UiTM FC in Alor Setar. The only goal of the match was scored by Danish forward Ken Ilsø, who pounced on a deflection to score in the 25th minute.

On 5 August 2017, Kedah lost their second away game with a 2–1 loss against Pahang in Super League, despite an equalizer by Syafiq.

=== September ===
On 9 September 2017, Kedah took the match against Kelantan seriously to triumphed 2–0 at Darul Aman Stadium. Ken Ilsø continuing his fine form with another goal to add to an earlier strike from Sandro as The Red Eagles won the group with consummate ease.

On 15 September 2017, Kedah recorded a 3–2 win over 2015 champions and 2016 runners up Selangor in their first leg Malaysia Cup quarter-final match at the Selayang Stadium. Ken Ilsø put two goals ahead within the first 15 minutes, but Selangor forward Rufino pulled one back for the hosts after the start of the second half. Syazwan Zainon restored Kedah's two-goal lead, but Rufino doubled his tally just a minute later to give the Red Giants a slim chance of overturning the tie in the second leg.

== Kit ==
Supplier: AL Sports / Sponsor: Bina Darulaman Berhad, Perbadanan Kemajuan Negeri Kedah (Kedah State Development Corporation), Syarikat Air Darul Aman (SADA), Cosmic Express

Home	Away	Third	Goalkeeper 1	Goalkeeper 2	Goalkeeper 3

== Players ==
=== Squad information ===
N	P	Nat.	POB	Name	Date of birth	Age	Since	Ends	Notes
1	GK	(Malaysia)	(Kedah)	Abdul Hadi Abdul Hamid	25 February 1987 (age 39)	30	2006		
2	DF	(Malaysia)	(Kedah)	Mohamad Syawal Nordin (vice-captain)	25 March 1993 (age 33)	24	2015		
3	DF	(Malaysia)	(Selangor)	Mohd Fitri Omar	25 June 1985 (age 41)	32	2017		
4	DF	(Australia)	(Queensland)	Zachary Michael Anderson	30 April 1991 (age 35)	26	2017	2017	
5	DF	(Malaysia)	(Kedah)	Osman Mohd Yusof	17 May 1994 (age 32)	23	2016		
7	MF	(Malaysia)	(Kedah)	Baddrol Bakhtiar (vice-captain)	1 February 1988 (age 38)	29	2006		
8	MF	(Kosovo)	(Kosovo)	Liridon Krasniqi	1 January 1992 (age 34)	25	2015	2018	
9	FW	(Denmark)	(Denmark)	Ken Ilsø Larsen	12 February 1986 (age 40)	31	2017		
10	MF	(Brazil)	(Fortaleza)	Sandro da Silva Mendonça (vice-captain)	1 October 1983 (age 42)	34	2015	2017	
—	DF	(Malaysia)	(Kedah)	Mohamad Raphi Azizan Mariappen	28 January 1996 (age 30)	21	2015	2017	
12	MF	(Malaysia)	(Kedah)	Muhammad Akram Mahinan	19 January 1993 (age 33)	24	2017		
13	DF	(Malaysia)	(Kedah)	Khairul Helmi Johari (captain)	31 March 1988 (age 38)	29	2006		
14	FW	(Malaysia)	(Kelantan)	Ahmad Fakri Saarani	8 July 1989 (age 37)	28	2016	2017	
15	DF	(Malaysia)	(Kedah)	Mohamad Rizal Ghazali	1 October 1992 (age 33)	25	2014		
16	MF	(Malaysia)	(Kedah)	Mohamad Amirul Hisyam Awang Kechik	5 May 1995 (age 31)	22	2016		
17	MF	(Malaysia)	(Kedah)	Mohd Syazwan Tajuddin	7 January 1994 (age 32)	23	2014		
18	MF	(Malaysia)	(Kedah)	Abdul Halim Saari	14 November 1994 (age 31)	23	2016		
19	MF	(Malaysia)	(Kedah)	Muhammad Farhan Roslan	3 December 1996 (age 29)	21	2014	2017	
20	FW	(Malaysia)	(Penang)	Muhammad Syafiq Ahmad	28 June 1995 (age 31)	22	2013		
21	GK	(Malaysia)	(Kedah)	Mohamad Farhan Abu Bakar	14 February 1993 (age 33)	24	2016		
22	MF	(Malaysia)	(Perlis)	Mohamad Syazwan Zainon	13 November 1989 (age 36)	28	2014		
23	MF	(Malaysia)	(Kedah)	Mohamad Hanif Mat Dzahir	15 January 1994 (age 32)	23	2014		
24	DF	(Malaysia)	(Kedah)	Mohamad Asri Mardzuki	12 May 1994 (age 32)	23	2016		
25	GK	(Malaysia)	(Kedah)	Mohd Ifwat Akmal Che Kassim	10 August 1996 (age 30)	21	2016		
26	FW	(Malaysia)	(Kedah)	Syazuan Hazani	27 June 1994 (age 32)	23	2016		
27	DF	(Malaysia)	(Kedah)	Muhammad Ariff Farhan Md Isa	14 July 1996 (age 30)	21	2016		
33	MF	(Malaysia)	(Kedah)	Muhammad Akhyar Abdul Rashid	1 May 1999 (age 27)	18	2017		
34	FW	(Malaysia)	(Kedah)	Muhammad Danial Ismail	5 February 1997 (age 29)	20	2017		

Last update: 9 September 2017
Source: Facebook Kedah FA
Ordered by squad number.

== Transfers ==
=== In ===
N	P	Nat.	Name	Age	Moving from	Type	Transfer window	Ends	Transfer fee
25	GK	(Malaysia)	Ifwat Akmal	20	Kedah U21	Promotion	Pre-season		
3	DF	(Malaysia)	Fitri Omar	31	Penang	Transfer	Pre-season	2017	
12	MF	(Malaysia)	Akram Mahinan	23	Johor Darul Ta'zim	Transfer	Pre-season	2017	
14	FW	(Malaysia)	Fakri Saarani	27	Felda United	End of loan	Pre-season	2017	
9	FW	(Denmark)	Ken Ilsø	30	(Singapore) Home United	Transfer	Pre-season	2017	
4	DF	(Australia)	Zac Anderson	25	(United Arab Emirates) Emirates Club	Transfer	Pre-season		
33	MF	(Malaysia)	Akhyar Rashid	17	Kedah U21	Loan			
31	GK	(Malaysia)	Asri Muhammad	18	Kedah U21	Loan			
32	DF	(Malaysia)	Loqman Hakim	19	Kedah U21	Loan			
34	FW	(Malaysia)	Akmal Azmi	19	Kedah U21	Loan			
35	MF	(Malaysia)	Hidhir Idris	20	Kedah U21	Loan			
36	FW	(Malaysia)	Aminuddin Abu Bakar	19	Kedah U21	Loan			

=== Out ===
N	P	Nat.	Name	Age	Moving to	Type	Transfer window	Transfer fee
2	DF	(Malaysia)	Mohd Sabre Mat Abu	29	PKNS	End of contract	Pre-season	
4	DF	(South Korea)	Bang Seung-hwan	33	(Thailand) Royal Thai Navy	End of contract	Pre-season	
6	DF	(Malaysia)	Shafizan Hashim	34		End of contract	Pre-season	
9	FW	(Brazil)	Thiago Augusto Fernandes	26	FELDA United	End of loan	Pre-season	
12	MF	(Malaysia)	Amar Rohidan	29		End of contract	Pre-season	
14	FW	(New Zealand)	Shane Smeltz	35	(New Zealand) Wellington Phoenix	End of contract	Pre-season	
21	GK	(Malaysia)	Mohamad Syazwan Abdullah	20	Melaka United	End of contract	Pre-season	
24	DF	(Malaysia)	Mohamad Alif Fadhil Ismail	24		End of contract	Pre-season	
25	DF	(Malaysia)	Azmeer Yusof	26	Kuala Lumpur	End of contract	Pre-season	
26	MF	(Malaysia)	Shazuan Ashraf Mathews	24	FELCRA	End of contract	Pre-season	
11	DF	(Malaysia)	Mohamad Raphi Azizan Mariappen	21	Petaling Jaya Rangers	Transfer	Mid-season	

== Technical staff ==
Position	Staff
Head coach	(Malaysia) Tan Cheng Hoe (until 29 April 2017) (Malaysia) Muhammad Nidzam Adzha (from 22 May 2017)
Assistant coach	(Malaysia) Muhammad Nidzam Adzha (until 22 May 2017) (Malaysia) Azzmi Ab. Aziz (from 11 June 2017)
Fitness coach	(Brazil) Stefano Impagliazzo
Goalkeeping coach	(Malaysia) Faozi Mukhlas
Physiotherapist	(Malaysia) Muhammad Nur'illya Samsudin
Medical officer	(Malaysia) Mohd Syahrizal Nadzer
Kitman	(Malaysia) Abdul Razak Md Desa (Malaysia) Mohd Nasir Othman

Last updated: 25 July 2017
Source: Kedah FA Technical Staff

== Friendly matches ==
=== Pre-season ===
Win Draw Loss

13 December 2016 Friendly	Kedah	2–1	(Perak) PKNP	Alor Setar, Kedah, Malaysia
20:45 UTC+08:00	Farhan Roslan 45'; Akram 90' (pen.)		Brandon M Mcolonald 15'	Stadium: Darul Aman Stadium; Attendance: 4,000; Referee: Mohd Munir Mohd Azam; Assistant referees: Mohd Sharil Abu Seman; Nasyafit Zulkefli; Fourth official: Asrul Zairi Abd Hamid

20 December 2016 Friendly	Kedah	2–1	Perlis	Alor Setar, Kedah, Malaysia
20:45 UTC+08:00	Amirul Hisyam 38'; Fakri Saarani 78'		Saiful Bashir 35'	Stadium: Darul Aman Stadium

30 December 2016 Friendly	Perlis	1–4	Kedah	Kangar, Perlis, Malaysia
20:45 UTC+08:00	Alafi Mahmud 40'		Fakri Saarani 19', 43'; Baddrol Bakhtiar 60'; Halim Saari 78'	Stadium: Tuanku Syed Putra Stadium

3 January 2017 Friendly	Kedah	4–1	(Malaysia) PDRM	Alor Setar, Kedah, Malaysia
20:45 UTC+08:00	Baddrol Bakhtiar 52', 59'; Fakri Saarani 69', 70'		Konaté 28'	Stadium: Darul Aman Stadium; Attendance: 7,000

7 January 2017 Friendly	PKNS (Selangor)	0–0	Kedah	Petaling Jaya, Selangor, Malaysia
20:45 UTC+08:00				Stadium: Kompleks Sukan PKNS; Attendance: 3,000

9 January 2017 Friendly	Terengganu	1–1	Kedah	Bangi, Selangor, Malaysia
17:00 UTC+08:00	Abdul Latiff Suhaimi 37'		Sandro 90' (pen.)	Stadium: UKM Bangi Stadium

11 January 2017 Friendly	FELCRA (Kuala Lumpur)	0–2	Kedah	Kuala Lumpur, Malaysia
20:45 UTC+08:00			Syafiq Ahmad 29'; Ken Ilsø 90'	Stadium: University of Malaya; Referee: Md Firdaus; Assistant referees: Kamarul Redza; Noor Azril; Fourth official: Naziran

=== Current season ===
23 January 2017 International Friendly	Hebei CF (China)	4–2	Kedah	Shah Alam
17:00 UTC+08:00	Ding Haifeng 29'; Wang Yang 45'; Xu Tianyuan 59'; Zhu Haiwei 68'		Liridon 57' (pen.); Syazuan Hazani 80'	Stadium: Shah Alam Stadium; Attendance: 0

25 March 2017 Friendly	Kedah	1–0	Perlis	Alor Setar
21:00 UTC+08:00	Liridon 11' (pen.); Fitri (yellow card) 17'			Stadium: Darul Aman Stadium; Referee: Mohd Izzat Izani Ali; Assistant referees: Mohd Sharil Abu Seman; Asrul Zairi Abd Hamid; Fourth official: K. Surinter

14 June 2017 Friendly	Kedah	4–0	Kedah U19	Alor Setar
22:00 UTC+08:00	Syazuan; Sandro; Akhyar			Stadium: Peremba

17 June 2017 Friendly	Kedah	3–3	Perlis	Sintok
22:00 UTC+08:00	Sandro 25', 65'; Nasharizam 50' (o.g.)		Ndumba Makeche 15'; Fikri 70'; Brandon Adams 75'	Stadium: Universiti Utara Malaysia; Attendance: 1,000

23 June 2017 Friendly	Kedah	4–3	Kedah U21	Alor Setar
22:00 UTC+08:00	Ken Ilsø 20'; Akhyar 23'; Sandro 25'; Liridon 68'		Khairuddin 10', 37'; Firdaus 88'	Stadium: Peremba

== Competitions ==
=== Overall ===
Competition	Started round	Current position / round	Final position / round	First match	Last match
Charity Shield	Final	—	Winners	20 January 2017	
Super League	Matchday 1	4th / Matchday 19	4th	20 January 2017	28 October 2017
FA Cup	Round of 32	—	Winners	14 February 2017	20 May 2017
Malaysia Cup	Group stage	1st / Group stage	Runners-up	4 July 2017	4 November 2017

Updated to match played 4 November 2017
Source: Competitions

=== Overview ===
Competition	Record							
Competition	Pld	W	D	L	GF	GA	GD	Win %
Super League	22	9	8	5	45	33	+12	40.91
FA Cup	7	6	0	1	19	6	+13	85.71
Malaysia Cup	11	8	1	2	24	10	+14	72.73
Total	40	23	9	8	88	49	+39	57.50

Last updated: 4 November 2017
Source: Competitions

=== Super League ===
The league kick-off on 20 January and ends on 21 October 2017.

==== League table ====
Pos	Team	Pld	W	D	L	GF	GA	GD	Pts	Qualification or relegation
2	Pahang (Note: Pahang withdraw from AFC competition.)	22	12	4	6	44	26	+18	40	
3	Felda United (Note: Felda United were relegated because they failed to renew their licence) (R)	22	11	6	5	40	26	+14	39	Relegation to Premier League
4	Kedah (Note: Kedah as 2017 Malaysia FA Cup winners not eligible for AFC competition spots as they failed granted AFC club license.)	22	9	8	5	45	33	+12	35	
5	Perak	22	9	7	6	30	31	−1	34	
6	Selangor	22	9	6	7	32	28	+4	33	

Source: FAM, FMLLP
Rules for classification: 1) Points; 2) Goal difference; 3) Number of goals scored.
(R) Relegated

==== Results summary ====
Overall								Home						Away					
Pld	W	D	L	GF	GA	GD	Pts	W	D	L	GF	GA	GD	W	D	L	GF	GA	GD
22	9	8	5	45	33	+12	35	6	3	2	27	12	+15	3	5	3	18	21	−3

Last updated: 28 October 2017.
Source: Super League fixtures and results

==== Results by round ====
Round	1	2	3	4	5	6	7	8	9	10	11	12	13	14	15	16	17	18	19	20	21	22
Ground	A	H	A	H	A	H	A	H	H	A	A	A	H	H	A	H	A	H	A	H	A	H
Result	D	W	D	W	W	W	D	W	D	L	D	D	W	L	W	D	W	W	L	L	L	D
Position	4	4	3	1	1	1	2	1	3	3	3	3	3	3	2	2	2	2	2	3	4	4

Updated to match(es) played on 28 October 2017. Source: Super League fixtures and results
A = Away; H = Home; W = Win; D = Draw; L = Loss

==== Fixtures and results ====
Win Draw Loss Postponed

===== First leg =====
20 January 2017 1 (#1) / Charity Shield	Johor Darul Ta'zim	1–1 (4–5 p)	Kedah	Johor Bahru
21:00 UTC+08:00	Brian (yellow card) 26'; S. Kunanlan (yellow card) 28' (yellow-red card) 45+3'; Safiq 41' (pen.); Hazwan Bakri (substituted off) 43'; J. Barrales (substituted on) 43'; Azammuddin (substituted off) 46'; Azrif Nasrulhaq (substituted on) 46'; Aidil (substituted off) 52'; Fadhli Shas (substituted on) 52'; M. António (yellow card) 65'; Safiq (yellow card) 68'	Report	Asri (yellow card) 10' (substituted off) 64'; Sandro (yellow card) 45+3' (substituted off) 65'; Baddrol 63'; Fitri (substituted on) 64'; Farhan (substituted on) 65'; Syawal (substituted off) 73'; Khairul Helmi (substituted on) 73'; Akram (yellow card) 80'	Stadium: Tan Sri Dato Haji Hassan Yunos Stadium; Attendance: 24,157; Referee: Suhaimi Mat Hassan; Assistant referees: Muhd Mu'azi Zainal Abidin; Mohd Zairul Khalil Tan; Fourth official: Mohd Zohri Tajudin; Goal-line assistants: Suresh Jayaraman; Ismail Asib Md Amin. Man of the Match: Baddrol
	Penalties
	J. Barrales (penalty scored); M. António (penalty scored); G. Cabrera (penalty scored); Brian (penalty missed); Safiq (penalty scored)		(penalty scored) Farhan; (penalty scored) Akram; (penalty scored) Ken Ilsø; (penalty scored) Baddrol; (penalty scored) Liridon

27 January 2017 2 (#7)	Kedah	3–2	Sarawak	Alor Setar
21:00 UTC+08:00	Baddrol 22'; Asri (yellow card) 41'; Farhan (substituted off) 46'; Ifwat (substituted on) 46'; Rizal (yellow card) 59'; Fakri (substituted off) 62'; Syazwan (substituted on) 62' (goal) 72'; Sandro 71'; Akram (substituted off) 79'; Amirul (substituted on) 79'	Report	Hartmann 10'; Tommy 26' (yellow card) 45' (substituted off) 63'; Izray Iffarul (substituted on) 63'; Shreen (substituted off) 82'; Kamaruddin Bohan (substituted on) 82'	Stadium: Darul Aman Stadium; Attendance: 25,000; Referee: Nagor Amir Noor Mohamed; Assistant referees: Fazrul Izwan Mohd Zin; Ahmad Azuan Mohd Rashdi; Fourth official: Mohd Izzat Izaini Ali

4 February 2017 3 (#13)	FELDA United (Kuala Lumpur)	1–1	Kedah	Jengka
21:00 UTC+08:00	Cellerino (yellow card) 35'; Norshahrul (yellow card) 42'; Hadin 58' (substituted off) 71'; Wan Amirul (substituted off) 66'; Aiman (substituted on) 66'; Ridzuan (substituted on) 71'; Fazrul (yellow card) 82'; Mootaz (substituted off) 90+3'; Fazly (substituted on) 90+3'	Report	Ken Ilsø (yellow card) 16' (goal) 24'; Fitri (yellow card) 44'; Akram (yellow card) 45+1'; Fakri (substituted off) 68'; Syazwan (substituted on) 68'; Sandro (substituted off) 90+4'; Amirul (substituted on) 90+4'	Stadium: Tun Abdul Razak Stadium; Attendance: 6,211; Referee: Fitri Maskon; Assistant referees: Mohd Yusri Muhamad; Nojey Naking; Fourth official: Mat Zan Abd Wahab

11 February 2017 4 (#19)	Kedah	4–1	Pahang	Alor Setar
21:00 UTC+08:00	Rizal (yellow card) 44'; Baddrol 45+1' (substituted off) 79'; Akram (substituted off) 49'; Amirul (substituted on) 49'; Syazwan (substituted off) 60'; Farhan (substituted on) 60' (goal) 75'; Ken Ilsø 67', 90+2'; Fakri (substituted on) 79'; Khairul Helmi (yellow card) 88'	Report	Sumareh (yellow card) 6'; Zaharulnizam (substituted off) 71'; Ashari (substituted on) 71'; Insa (substituted off) 85'; Azam (substituted on) 85'; Matheus 89'	Stadium: Darul Aman Stadium; Attendance: 12,000; Referee: Muhd Nazmi Nasaruddin; Assistant referees: Azmi Khalid; Muhamad Farhan Abd Aziz; Fourth official: Mohd Zaidi Zakariya; Man of the Match: Ken Ilsø

18 February 2017 5 (#26)	Kelantan	0–1	Kedah	Kota Bharu
21:00 UTC+08:00	Celin (substituted off) 12'; Danial (substituted on) 12' (yellow card) 84'; Daudsu (substituted off) 54'; Hattaphon (substituted on) 54'; Nor Farhan (substituted off) 73'; Zamani (substituted on) 73'	Report	Farhan (substituted off) 18'; Halim (substituted on) 18'; Akram (yellow card) 37'; Amirul (substituted off) 71'; Syafiq (substituted on) 71'; Baddrol 82' (pen.); Fakri (substituted off) 86'; Hanif (substituted on) 86'	Stadium: Sultan Mohammad IV Stadium; Attendance: 20,853; Referee: Suhaimi Mat Hassan; Assistant referees: Ismadi Ibrahim; Azmi Khalid; Fourth official: Mohd Hasrol Mohd Amir

25 February 2017 6 (#31)	Kedah	3–1	Penang	Alor Setar
21:00 UTC+08:00	Fitri 21' (substituted off) 82'; Anderson (yellow card) 33'; Ken Ilsø (yellow card) 37'; Halim (substituted off) 59'; Asri (substituted on) 59'; Fakri (substituted off) 68'; Syafiq (substituted on) 68' (goal) 75'; Hanif (substituted on) 82' (yellow card) 90'; Liridon 86'	Report	Faiz Subri 19'; Kumaahran (substituted off) 68'; Redzuan (substituted on) 68'; Faizat (substituted off) 78'; Jafri Firdaus Chew (substituted on) 78'; Syamer (substituted off) 84'; Azrul (substituted on) 84'	Stadium: Darul Aman Stadium; Attendance: 25,000; Referee: Nagor Amir Noor Mohamed; Assistant referees: Nojey Anak Naking; Abdul Harun Osman; Fourth official: Mohd Zaidi Zakariya

1 March 2017 7 (#38)	Selangor	1–1	Kedah	Selayang
21:00 UTC+08:00	Halim (substituted off) 58'; Adam Nor (substituted on) 58'; Rizal (yellow card) 59' (substituted off) 84'; Nurshamil (substituted on) 84'; Raimi (substituted off) 89'; Fittri (substituted on) 89'; Mineiro 90+5'	Report	Syafiq (yellow card) 45+2' (substituted off) 76'; Fitri (substituted off) 46'; Syazwan (substituted on) 46'; Amirul (substituted off) 59'; Sandro (substituted on) 59' (goal) 81'; Hanif (substituted on) 76'; Rizal (yellow card) 87'; Akram (yellow card) 90+4'	Stadium: Selayang Stadium; Attendance: 8,315; Referee: Mohd Zohri Tajudin; Assistant referees: Muhd Zairul Khalil Tan; Muhd Farhan Abdul Aziz; Fourth official: Tuan Mohd Yaasin

4 March 2017 8 (#44)	Kedah	4–0	(Malacca) Melaka United	Alor Setar
21:00 UTC+08:00	Ken Ilsø 34', 90+3'; Sandro 49', 79'; Fitri (substituted off) 55'; Halim (substituted on) 55'; Syazwan (substituted off) 80'; Akhyar (substituted on) 80'; Liridon (substituted off) 82' (yellow card) 90+3'; Hanif (substituted on) 82'; Anderson (yellow card) 86'	Report	S. Agüero (yellow card) 23'; Faizal (yellow card) 48'; Isma Alif Mohd Salim (substituted off) 64'; Fauzi (substituted on) 64'; A. Khuzaimi (substituted off) 73'; Syawal (substituted on) 73'; Surendran (substituted off) 82'; Jasmir (substituted on) 82'; Azrin (yellow card) 90+4'	Stadium: Darul Aman Stadium; Attendance: 25,000; Referee: S. Sitharajan; Assistant referees: Mohd Shahreen Che Omar; Suresh Basgaran; Fourth official: Mohd Izzat Izaini Ali

18 March 2017 26 April 2017 9 (#49)	Perak TBG	1–1	Kedah	Ipoh
21:00 UTC+08:00	Hafiz (yellow card) 28' (goal) 61'; Adha (substituted off) 74'; Nazrin (substituted on) 74'; Faton (substituted off) 79'; Shahrul (substituted on) 79' (yellow card) 90+3'; Hadi (substituted off) 90+1'; Mirchev (substituted on) 90+1'	Report	Liridon (yellow card) 42'; Baddrol (yellow card) 68' (goal) 71'; Halim (substituted off) 70'; Syafiq (substituted on) 70'; Syazwan (substituted off) 75'; Fakri (substituted on) 75'; Sandro (substituted off) 82'; Farhan (substituted on) 82'	Stadium: Perak Stadium; Attendance: 3,753; Referee: Nagor Amir Noor Mohamed (Kuala Lumpur); Assistant referees: Mohd Shahreen Che Omar (Kuala Lumpur); Mohd Zairul Khalil Tan (Melaka); Fourth official: Mohd Azhar Ismail (Perak)

8 April 2017 10 (#55)	Kedah	1–1	(Selangor) PKNS	Alor Setar
21:00 UTC+08:00	Liridon (yellow card) 6'; Anderson 37'; Farhan (substituted off) 56'; Shafiq (substituted on) 56'; Sandro (yellow card) 58'; Ken Ilsø (yellow card) 87'	Report	K. Gurusamy (yellow card) 6' (substituted off) 90+1'; Lucas Espíndola 29'; P. Gunalan (yellow card) 30' (substituted off) 66'; Patrick (yellow card) 39'; Safee Sali (yellow card) 53'; Mohd Azmi Muslim (substituted on) 66'; Shahrul Azhar Ture (substituted off) 80'; Abdul Ghani Rahman (substituted on) 80'; Affize Faisal (substituted on) 90+1'	Stadium: Darul Aman Stadium; Attendance: 20,000; Referee: Suhaimi Mat Hassan; Assistant referees: Ismadi Ibrahim; Fazrul Izwan; Fourth official: Mohd Izzat Izaini Ali; Man of the Match: Anderson

15 April 2017 11 (#61)	T–Team (Terengganu)	5–0	Kedah	Kuala Terengganu
21:00 UTC+08:00	Sharofetdinov 10' (substituted off) 68'; M. Fakhrurazi Musa (yellow card) 31' (substituted off) 88'; Hakim Hassan 37', 60', 64' (substituted off) 87'; Samassa 45+5'; Badrul (substituted on) 68'; Fauzi (substituted on) 68'; Azali Alias (substituted on) 88'	Report	Rizal (red card) 31'; Sandro (substituted off) 46'; Fakri (substituted on) 46'; Syazwan (substituted off) 64'; Asri (substituted on) 64'; Baddrol (substituted off) 64'; Farhan (substituted on) 64'; Syafiq (yellow card) 77'; Fitri (yellow card) 90+1'	Stadium: Sultan Ismail Nasiruddin Shah Stadium; Attendance: 1,144; Referee: Suresh Jayaraman; Assistant referees: Muhamad Mu'azi Zainal Abidin; Mohd Zulkifli Jusoh; Fourth official: Hamdan Awang

===== Second leg =====
26 April 2017 24 May 2017 12 (#67)	Kedah	3–0	(Terengganu) T–Team	Alor Setar
21:00 UTC+08:00	Ken Ilsø 12', 14', 45'; Ifwat (substituted off) 59'; Hadi (substituted on) 59'; Rizal (substituted off) 67'; Syazwan (substituted on) 67'; Syafiq (substituted off) 67'; Fakri (substituted on) 67'	Report	Abdullah Suleiman (substituted off) 46'; Sharofetdinov (substituted on) 46'; Badrul (substituted off) 54'; Hakim Hassan (substituted on) 54'; Fauzi (substituted off) 83'; Ramzi Sufian (substituted on) 83'; Amirzafran (yellow card) 90'	Stadium: Darul Aman Stadium; Attendance: 10,000; Referee: Razlan Jeffri Ali; Assistant referees: Mohd Khalid Md Aris; Asmadi Noor Hasni; Fourth official: Mohd Izzat Izaini Ali; Man of the Match: Sandro

6 May 2017 9 May 2017 13 (#73)	PKNS (Selangor)	4–4	Kedah	Shah Alam
21:00 UTC+08:00	Patrick 13'; Nizam Abu Bakar (substituted off) 34'; Ramadhan (substituted on) 34'; Gonzalo Soto (yellow card) 41'; P. Gunalan (substituted off) 46'; Mohd Azmi Muslim (substituted on) 46'; Matías Jadue 60', 90+4' (pen.); Azreen (yellow card) 83'; Khyril (substituted off) 84'; Bobby Gonzales (substituted on) 84'; Lucas Espíndola 89'; Fauzan (yellow card) 90'	Report	Ken Ilsø 5'; Syafiq 16', 23' (substituted off) 61'; Baddrol (substituted on) 61'; Hanif (substituted off) 61'; Syazwan (substituted on) 61'; Ifwat (substituted off) 69'; Farhan (substituted on) 69'; Syawal (yellow card) 81'; Sandro 90+3' (pen.)	Stadium: Shah Alam Stadium; Attendance: 4,290; Referee: Mohd Amirul Izwan Yaacob; Assistant referees: Mohd Hariff Md Akhir; Muhammad Zairul Khalil Tan; Fourth official: Ahmad Tajudin Mohd Yusof

1 July 2017 14 (#80)	Kedah	2–3	Perak TBG	Alor Setar
21:00 UTC+08:00	Akram (yellow card) 13' (substituted off) 55'; Syazwan Tajuddin 30' (o.g.); Khairul Helmi (substituted off) 33'; Amirul (substituted on) 33'; Sandro (yellow card) 52' (goal) 59'; Ariff Farhan (substituted on) 55'; Fakri (substituted off) 81'; Akhyar (substituted on) 81'; Liridon 85'	Report	Leandro (yellow card) 8'; Nasir 47' (substituted off) 50'; Adha (substituted on) 50'; Hafiz (substituted off) 66'; Shahrul (substituted on) 66' (yellow card) 90'; Gilmar 73'; Yashir (yellow card) 87'; Nazrin (substituted off) 90+3'; Jasazrin (substituted on) 90+3'	Stadium: Darul Aman Stadium; Attendance: 7,656; Referee: Suhaimi Mat Hassan; Assistant referees: Nojey Naking; Muhd Juhairi Idris; Fourth official: Mohammad Izzat Izaini Ali; Man of the Match: Sandro

11 July 2017 15 (#85)	Melaka United (Malacca)	2–4	Kedah	Krubong
21:00 UTC+08:00	Simic 10', 31'; Swirad (yellow card) 50'; Jeon (substituted off) 67'; Fandi (substituted on) 67'; Norhakim (yellow card) 68'; Faizal (substituted off) 78'; Jasmir (substituted on) 78'	Report	Akram (yellow card) 9' (goal) 56' (substituted off) 67'; Fitri (yellow card) 13'; Baddrol 15', 41'; Hanif (substituted on) 67'; Syazwan (substituted off) 76'; Asri (substituted on) 76' (goal) 90+4'; Liridon (substituted off) 83'; Syazwan Tajuddin (substituted on) 83'	Stadium: Hang Jebat Stadium; Attendance: 7,048; Referee: Zulkarnain Zakaria; Assistant referees: Muhammad Farhan Abdul Aziz; Mohd Azha Khalid; Fourth official: Mohd Ridzuan Rozali

15 July 2017 16 (#91)	Kedah	1–1	Selangor	Alor Setar
21:00 UTC+08:00	Ken Ilsø 30'; Hanif (substituted off) 84'; Akmal (substituted on) 84'; Syazwan Tajuddin (yellow card) 86'; Baddrol (yellow card) 89'	Report	Veenod 16'; Rufino (substituted off) 24'; Fittri (substituted on) 24' (substituted off) 90+4'; Namathevan (yellow card) 61'; Raimi (substituted off) 80'; Kannan (substituted on) 80'; Norazlan (yellow card) 88'; Bunyamin (substituted on) 90+4'	Stadium: Darul Aman Stadium; Attendance: 18,000; Referee: Fitri Maskom; Assistant referees: Ismadi Ibrahim; Suresh Basgaran; Fourth official: Shaharudin Man; Man of the Match: Sandro

22 July 2017 17 (#97)	Penang	0–2	Kedah	Batu Kawan
21:00 UTC+08:00	Mohd Faiz Subri (substituted off) 65'; R. Surendran (substituted on) 65'; Azidan Sarudin (substituted off) 71'; Mohd Syukur Saidin (substituted on) 71'; Syamer Kutty Abba (yellow card) 78'	Report	Fitri (yellow card) 30'; Fakri (substituted off) 61'; Baddrol (substituted on) 61' (goal) 74'; Ken Ilsø 62'; Sandro (substituted off) 79'; Khairul Helmi (substituted on) 79'; Rizal (substituted off) 84'; Akmal (substituted on) 84'	Stadium: Penang State Stadium; Attendance: 18,545; Referee: Mohd Amirul Izwan Yaacob; Assistant referees: Nojey Naking; Abdul Harun Osman; Fourth official: Abdul Rahim Abdulah

26 July 2017 18 (#103)	Kedah	5–0	Kelantan	Alor Setar
21:00 UTC+08:00	Ariff Farhan 8' (substituted off) 46'; Fitri (substituted on) 46' (yellow card) 90+1'; Ken Ilsø 48', 60'; Anderson (substituted off) 63'; Syawal (substituted on) 63'; Syazwan (substituted off) 67'; Fakri (substituted on) 67'; Sandro 71', 87'; Khairul Helmi (yellow card) 85'	Report	Fadhilah (yellow card) 41' (substituted off) 51'; Qayyum (yellow card) 45+1' (substituted off) 66'; Indra Putra (yellow card) 50'; Danial (substituted on) 51'; Aziz Ismail (substituted on) 66'; Farisham (substituted off) 75'; Hattaphon (substituted on) 75' (yellow card) 90+1'	Stadium: Darul Aman Stadium; Attendance: 11,970; Referee: Mohammad Zamzaidi Katimin; Assistant referees: Muhammad Juhairi Idris; Ahmad Azanor Huslan; Fourth official: Mohd Izzat Izaini Ali; Man of the Match: Khairul Helmi

5 August 2017 19 (#109)	Pahang	2–1	Kedah	Kuantan
21:00 UTC+08:00	Jaewon (yellow card) 23'; Azam (yellow card) 39'; Davies (yellow card) 58'; Romero 65' (substituted off) 87'; Joseph (substituted off) 75'; Ashari (substituted on) 75'; Insa (substituted off) 75'; Saiful (substituted on) 75'; Matheus 80' (yellow card) 81'; Kogileswaran Raj (substituted on) 87'	Report	Syafiq (yellow card) 18' (goal) 78'; Hanif (substituted off) 30'; Amirul (substituted on) 30' (yellow card) 43'; Fitri (substituted off) 46'; Baddrol (substituted on) 46'; Akhyar (substituted off) 46'; Syazwan (substituted on) 46'; Sandro (yellow card) 72'	Stadium: Darul Makmur Stadium; Attendance: 6,111; Referee: Nagor Amir Noor Mohamed; Assistant referees: Mohammad Zairul Khalil Tan; Asmadi Noor Hasni; Fourth official: Rusli Ismail

20 September 2017 20 (#115)	Kedah	1–3	(Kuala Lumpur) FELDA United	Alor Setar
21:00 UTC+08:00	Ken Ilsø 21'; Liridon (yellow card) 39'; Fakri (substituted off) 68'; Syazuan (substituted on) 68'; Akram (substituted off) 68'; Amirul (substituted on) 68'; Syazwan Tajuddin (substituted off) 84'; Fitri (substituted on) 84'	Report	Wan Zack 2', 49' (substituted off) 85'; Mohd Farizal Harun (yellow card) 16'; Thiago 19'; Hadin (substituted off) 77'; Ifedayo (substituted on) 77'; Norshahrul (substituted on) 85'; Djulbic (yellow card) 90'	Stadium: Darul Aman Stadium; Attendance: 4,000; Referee: Wan Mohamad Tarmizi; Assistant referees: Ahmad Azanor Huslan; Fazrul Izwan Mohd Zin; Fourth official: Nasshafit Zulkifli

30 Sept 27 September 2017 21 (#121)	Sarawak	4–2	Kedah	Kuching
20:15 UTC+08:00	Shamie 53'; Roskam 58' (pen.), 63'; Hairol 77'	Report	Ilsø 7'; Baddrol 45+2'	Stadium: Sarawak State Stadium; Attendance: 1,162; Referee: Khirulazuan Kidam; Assistant referees: Muhamad Mu'azi Zainal Abidin; Shahidan Mohd Adnan; Fourth official: Busrh Eri

21 October 2017 28 October 2017 22 (#127)	Kedah	0–0	Johor Darul Ta'zim	Alor Setar
21:00 UTC+08:00		Report		Stadium: Darul Aman Stadium; Attendance: 3,000; Referee: Muhd Rahmat Jantan

=== FA Cup ===
The tournament kick-off on 5 February and ends on 20 May 2017.

==== Results summary ====
Overall								Home						Away					
Pld	W	D	L	GF	GA	GD	Pts	W	D	L	GF	GA	GD	W	D	L	GF	GA	GD
7	6	0	1	19	6	+13	18	3	0	0	11	3	+8	3	0	1	8	3	+5

Last updated: 20 May 2017.
Source: FA Cup fixtures and results

==== Knockout phase ====
===== Round of 32 =====
14 February 2017 Round 2 (#11)	Kedah	4–2	Kuala Lumpur	Alor Setar
21:00 UTC+08:00	Liridon 33'; Zaiful 36' (o.g.); Farhan 42', 63'; Ken Ilsø (substituted off) 61'; Fakri (substituted on) 61'; Sandro (substituted off) 61'; Halim (substituted on) 61'; Fitri (substituted off) 67'; Asri (substituted on) 67'	Report	Zaiful (yellow card) 41'; Zhafri (yellow card) 32'; Nicolas (yellow card) 42'; Azmeer Yusof (substituted off) 52'; Arif Anwar (substituted on) 52'; Hafiz Johar (substituted off) 67'; Modibo Konte (substituted on) 67'; Anderson 76' (o.g.); De Paula (substituted off) 77'; Ibrahim Syaihul (substituted on) 77' (goal) 90+3'	Stadium: Darul Aman; Attendance: 12,000; Referee: Suresh Jayaraman; Assistant referees: Suresh Basgaran; Abdul Halim Mohd Ramlan; Fourth official: Mohd Izzat Izaini Ali

===== Round of 16 =====
11 March 2017 Round 3 (#22)	Perak TBG	0–2	Kedah	Ipoh
21:00 UTC+08:00	Shahrul (substituted off) 39'; Nasir (substituted on) 39'; Yashir (yellow card) 60' (substituted off) 61'; Nazrin (substituted on) 61'; Faton (substituted off) 69'; A. Khairil (substituted on) 69'; Jasazrin (yellow card) 90+3'	Report	Amirul (substituted off) 27'; Akram (substituted on) 27'; Anderson 28'; Ken Ilsø 43'; Halim (substituted off) 58'; Baddrol (substituted on) 58'; Syazwan (substituted off) 72'; Farhan (substituted on) 72'	Stadium: Perak; Attendance: 24,935; Referee: Mohd Nazmi Nasaruddin; Assistant referees: Muhammad Mu'azi Zainal Abidin; Mohd Zairul Md Noor; Fourth official: Mohd Faizudin Ismail

===== Quarter-finals =====
1 April 2017 First leg (#30)	Kedah	6–1	(Perak) PKNP	Alor Setar
21:00 UTC+08:00	Fitri 15'; G. Mugenthiran 30' (o.g.); Rizal (yellow card) 35'; Liridon 45' (pen.); Ken Ilsø 48', 90+1'; Baddrol (substituted off) 72'; Akhyar (substituted on) 72'; Syazwan (substituted off) 72'; Syafiq (substituted on) 72'; Akram (substituted off) 77'; Hanif (substituted on) 77'; Syafiq 86'	Report	Sukri (yellow card) 35'; Mugenthiran (substituted off) 50'; Deevan (substituted on) 50'; Irwan (substituted off) 59'; Fikri Sudin (substituted on) 59' (yellow card) 35'; Gilberto (yellow card) 35'; Syazwan Zaipol Bahari (yellow card) 35'; Ganesh (substituted off) 78'; Khairul Asyraf Ramli (substituted on) 59' (goal) 85'	Stadium: Darul Aman; Attendance: 24,500; Referee: Fitri Maskan; Assistant referees: Azman Ismail; Suresh Basgaran; Fourth official: Muhammad Izzat Izaini Ali; Man of the Match: Fitri

21 April 2017 Second leg (#34)	PKNP (Perak)	1–0 (2–6 agg.)	Kedah	Ipoh
21:00 UTC+08:00	Shahrel Fikri 10'; Vikneswaran (substituted off) 64'; Amirul (substituted on) 64'; Vincent Weijl (substituted off) 68'; Norhamizaref (substituted on) 68'; Faizzwan (substituted off) 76'; Norhizwan (substituted on) 76'	Report	Rizal (yellow card) 49'; Sandro (yellow card) 52'; Syafiq (substituted off) 74'; Baddrol (substituted on) 74'; Farhan (substituted off) 76'; Syazwan (substituted on) 76'; Ken Ilsø (substituted off) 80'; Fakri (substituted on) 80'	Stadium: Perak; Attendance: 3,857; Referee: Zulkarnain Zakaria; Assistant referees: Muhammad Juhairi Idris; Mohammad Azha Khalid; Fourth official: Mohd Jefri Zolkefli; Goal-line assistants: Abd Rahim Abdullah; S. Logeswaran

===== Semi-finals =====
30 April 2017 First leg (#37)	Kedah	1–0	Terengganu	Alor Setar
21:00 UTC+08:00	Halim (substituted off) 26'; Syawal (substituted on) 26'; Fitri (yellow card) 58'; Khairul Helmi (yellow card) 60'; Sandro (substituted off) 69'; Farhan (substituted on) 69' (goal) 70'; Syazwan (substituted off) 74'; Fakri (substituted on) 74'	Report	Issey (yellow card) 57' (substituted off) 84'; Adib (yellow card) 74' (yellow-red card) 79'; A. Shukur (substituted off) 75'; Faruqi (substituted on) 75'; Ferris Danial (substituted off) 78'; J. Partiban (substituted on) 78'; Asrol (substituted on) 84'	Stadium: Darul Aman; Attendance: 22,000; Referee: Muhammad Zamzaidi Katimin; Assistant referees: Nojey Naking; Muhammad Farhan Abd Aziz; Fourth official: Mohd Fairuzi Mat Desa; Goal-line assistants: Ku Alaudin Ku Mohamad; Ahmad Tajudin Mohd Yusof. Man of the Match: Akram

13 May 2017 Second leg (#39)	Terengganu	0–3 (0–4 agg.)	Kedah	Kuala Terengganu
21:00 UTC+08:00	A. Shukur (substituted off) 40'; Faruqi (substituted on) 40'; Ferris Danial (substituted off) 46'; J. Partiban (substituted on) 46'; Turaev (substituted off) 64'; M. Amirul Syahmi (substituted on) 64' (yellow card) 71'	Report	Liridon 6'; Akram (yellow card) 23' (substituted off) 85'; Ken Ilsø 28'; Sandro 48' (substituted off) 78'; Syazwan (substituted off) 63'; Syafiq (substituted on) 63'; Syazwan (substituted on) 78'; Farhan (substituted on) 85'	Stadium: Sultan Ismail Nasiruddin Shah; Attendance: 10,000; Referee: Nagor Amir Noor Mohamad; Assistant referees: Mohd Abd Suki Said; Muhammad Zairul Khalil Tan; Fourth official: Mohd Hasrul Mohd Amir; Goal-line assistants: Muhammad Rahmat Jantan; S. Logeswaran

===== Final =====
20 May 2017 Final (#40)	Pahang	2–3	Kedah	Shah Alam
21:00 UTC+08:00	Insa (yellow card) 25' (yellow-red card) 32'; Heo Jae-won 45+3'; Zaharulnizam (substituted off) 78'; Ashari (substituted on) 78'; Sumareh 80'; Syamim (substituted off) 85'; Azam (substituted on) 85'	Report	Ken Ilsø 20' (substituted off) 84'; Baddrol 45+1', 72' (substituted off) 89'; Fitri (yellow card) 61'; Syazwan (substituted off) 72'; Syafiq (substituted on) 72' (yellow card) 79'; Rizal (yellow card) 73'; Syazwan (substituted on) 84' (yellow card) 90+4'; Fakri (substituted on) 89'; Liridon (yellow card) 89'	Stadium: Shah Alam; Attendance: 78,898; Referee: Nagor Amir Noor Mohamed; Assistant referees: Mohammad Zairul Khalil Tan; Fazrul Izwan Md Zin; Fourth official: Muhammad Rahmat Jantan; Man of the Match: Baddrol

=== Malaysia Cup ===
The tournament will kick-off on 4 July 2017 and ends on 4 November 2017.

==== Results summary ====
Overall								Home						Away					
Pld	W	D	L	GF	GA	GD	Pts	W	D	L	GF	GA	GD	W	D	L	GF	GA	GD
11	8	1	2	24	10	+14	25	5	0	1	8	2	+6	3	1	1	16	8	+8

Last updated: 4 November 2017.
Source: Malaysia Cup fixtures and results

==== Group stage ====
Pos	Team	Pld	W	D	L	GF	GA	GD	Pts	Qualification	KDH	MLK	KLT	UITM
1	Kedah	6	5	0	1	17	5	+12	15	Advance to knockout phase	—	2–0	2–0	1–0
2	(Malacca) Melaka United	6	3	0	3	13	16	−3	9	Advance to knockout phase	2–6	—	3–0	2–1
3	Kelantan	6	2	0	4	8	12	−4	6		3–1	2–3	—	3–1
4	(Selangor) UiTM	6	2	0	4	9	14	−5	6		0–5	5–3	2–0	—

Updated to match(es) played on 9 September 2017. Source: FAM FMLLP

Win Draw Loss Postponed

4 July 2017 1 (#C1)	Kedah	2–0	(Malacca) Melaka United	Alor Setar
21:00 UTC+08:00	Sandro 29'; Baddrol 64' (substituted off) 65'; Asri (substituted on) 65'; Ariff (substituted off) 68'; Syazwan Tajuddin (substituted on) 68'; Syafiq (substituted off) 73'; Fakri (substituted on) 73'; Syawal (yellow card) 90+1'	Report	Azinee (substituted off) 46'; Fauzi (substituted on) 46'; Fandi (yellow card) 59'; Jeon (substituted off) 63'; Izzaq (substituted off) 63'; Norhakim (substituted off) 72'; Jasmir (substituted on) 72'	Stadium: Darul Aman; Attendance: 4,500; Referee: Mohd Amirul Izwan Yaacob; Assistant referees: Ahmad Azanor Huslan; Asmadi Noor Hasni; Fourth official: Muhammad Munir Mohd Izam; Man of the Match: Syazwan

7 July 2017 2 (#C4)	UiTM (Selangor)	0–5	Kedah	Shah Alam
21:00 UTC+08:00	Marcel (yellow card) 1'; Kughegbe (yellow card) 45+2'; Asnan (substituted off) 46'; Sadam (substituted on) 46'; Izman (substituted off) 64'; Ridzuan (substituted on) 64'; Nik Syafiq (substituted off) 76'; Anwarul (substituted on) 76'; Faiz 90+3' (o.g.)	Report	Syafiq 3' (substituted off) 64'; Ariff Farhan (yellow card) 18'; Liridon 44'; Ifwat (substituted off) 60'; Hadi (substituted on) 60'; Fitri (substituted on) 64'; Baddrol (substituted off) 78'; Akram (substituted on) 78'; Ken Ilsø 80'; Sandro 90'	Stadium: UiTM; Attendance: 2,985; Referee: Nagor Amir Noor Mohamed; Assistant referees: Asmadi Noor Hasni; Ahamad Azuan

18 July 2017 3 (#C5)	Kelantan	3–1	Kedah	Kota Bharu
21:00 UTC+08:00	Gomis 54'; Fadhilah (yellow card) 57' (substituted off) 84'; Abou Bakr Al-Mel 65', 90+3' (substituted off) 90+3'; Indra Putra (yellow card) 72'; Qayyum (yellow card) 83'; Nor Farhan (substituted on) 84'; Khairul Izuan (substituted off) 90+2'; Rozaimi (substituted on) 90+2'; Nik Azli Nik Alias (substituted on) 90+3'	Report	Baddrol (substituted off) 55'; Farhan (substituted on) 55' (substituted off) 62'; Hanif (substituted on) 62'; Khairul Helmi (yellow card) 79'; Liridon 85' (pen.); Syazwan (substituted off) 85'; Fakri (substituted on) 85'	Stadium: Sultan Muhammad IV; Attendance: 2,357; Referee: Razlan Jeffri Ali; Assistant referees: Azmi Khalid; Ahmad Faizal Mamat; Fourth official: Ku Alauddin Ku Muhammad

29 July 2017 4 (#C7)	Melaka United (Malacca)	2–6	Kedah	Krubong
21:00 UTC+08:00	Azinee 22'; Norhakim (yellow card) 31' (substituted off) 46'; Nazri (substituted off) 46'; Jasmir (substituted on) 46'; Fauzi (substituted on) 46' (goal) 53'; Khair (substituted off) 73'; Khuzaimi Piee (substituted on) 73'; Ahmad Ezrie Shafizie (yellow card) 84'	Report	Fakri 5' (substituted off) 60'; Sandro 35', 39'; Akram 45+3' (yellow card) 63'; Anderson (substituted off) 60'; Syawal (substituted on) 60'; Syazwan (substituted on) 60'; Baddrol (substituted off) 76'; Akhyar (substituted on) 76' (goal) 90'; Ken Ilsø 77'; Khairul Helmi (yellow card) 87'	Stadium: Hang Jebat; Attendance: 6,548; Referee: Suhaimi Mat Hassan; Assistant referees: Mohd Yusri Muhammad; Ismadi Ibrahim; Fourth official: Jubik Andangon

1 August 2017 5 (#C10)	Kedah	1–0	(Selangor) UiTM	Alor Setar
21:00 UTC+08:00	Liridon 24' (yellow card) 34'; Fakri (substituted off) 69'; Syafiq (substituted on) 69'; Fitri (substituted off) 69'; Ariff Farhan (substituted on) 69'; Akram (substituted off) 73'; Sandro (substituted on) 73'	Report	Nursalam (yellow card) 42'; Afif Asyraf (substituted off) 58'; Kughegbe (substituted on) 58'; Izman (substituted off) 59'; Sadam (substituted on) 59'; Nik Syafiq (substituted off) 81'; Hanif (substituted on) 81'	Stadium: Darul Aman; Attendance: 10,300; Referee: Zulkarnain Zakaria; Assistant referees: Naimuldin Harun; Suresh Basgaran; Fourth official: Mohd Izzat Izaini Ali; Man of the Match: Farhan Abu Bakar

9 August 2017 9 September 2017 6 (#C11)	Kedah	2–0	Kelantan	Alor Setar
21:00 UTC+08:00	Hanif (substituted off) 13'; Amirul (substituted on) 13'; Sandro 24'; Syafiq (substituted off) 71'; Farhan (substituted on) 71'; Syazuan (substituted off) 75'; Hidhir (substituted on) 75'; Ken Ilsø 77'	Report	Aziz Ismail (substituted off) 17'; Zairul (substituted on) 17'; Faizol (yellow card) 65'; Hattaphon (substituted off) 66'; S. Subramaniam (substituted on) 66'; Nor Farhan (substituted off) 78'; Azli Alias (substituted on) 78'	Stadium: Darul Aman; Attendance: 10,000; Referee: Muhammad Nazmi Nasaruddin; Assistant referees: Azmi Khalid; Muhammad Juhairi Idris; Fourth official: Shaharuddin Man; Man of the Match: Sandro

==== Knockout phase ====
===== Quarter-finals =====
15 September 2017 First leg	Selangor	2–3	Kedah	Selayang
21:00 UTC+08:00	Razman (yellow card) 13'; Rufino 53', 71'; Saiful (substituted off) 56'; Andik (substituted on) 56'; Kannan (substituted off) 69'; Raimi (substituted on) 69'; Amri (yellow card) 75'; Ukah (yellow card) 77'; Adam Nor (substituted off) 78'; Namathevan (substituted on) 78'	Report	Ken Ilsø 7', 15' (yellow card) 74'; Amirul (yellow card) 12'; Syazwan 69' (substituted off) 79'; Fitri (substituted off) 70'; Ariff Farhan (substituted on) 70'; Sandro (yellow card) 77'; Baddrol (substituted off) 79'; Akram (substituted on) 79'; Syawal (substituted on) 79'	Stadium: MP Selayang; Attendance: 7,282; Referee: Muhd Nazmi Nasaruddin; Assistant referees: Mohd Arif Shamil Abd Rasid; Nojey Naking; Fourth official: Nagor Amir Noor Mohamed; Goal-line assistants: Ismail Asib Mohd Amin; Ahmad Tajudin Mohd Yusof. Man of the Match: Sandro

24 September 2017 Second leg	Kedah	1–0 (4–2 agg.)	Selangor	Alor Setar
21:00 UTC+08:00	Rizal (yellow card) 2' (substituted off) 58'; Sandro 30' (pen.); Khairul Helmi (yellow card) 45+1'; Ariff Farhan (substituted on) 58'; Syazwan (substituted off) 74'; Farhan (substituted on) 74'; Baddrol (substituted off) 87'; Akhyar (substituted on) 87'; Liridon (yellow card) 90+2'	Report	Raimi (yellow card) 43' (substituted off) 49'; Andik (substituted on) 49'; Rufino (yellow card) 56'; Saiful (substituted off) 61'; Kannan (substituted on) 61'; Syahmi (substituted off) 75'; Halim (substituted on) 75' (yellow card) 76'	Stadium: Darul Aman; Attendance: 23,000; Referee: Nagor Amir Noor Mohamed; Assistant referees: Azman Ismail; Muhammad Juhairi Idris; Fourth official: Shaharudin Man; Goal-line assistants: Ku Alaudin Ku Mohamad; Abd Rahim Abdullah. Man of the Match: Liridon & Ifwat

===== Semi-finals =====
15 October 2017 First leg	FELDA United (Pahang)	1–1	Kedah	Jengka
21:00 UTC+08:00	Hadin 87'	Report	Sandro 62'	Stadium: Tun Abdul Razak; Attendance: 7,976; Referee: Muhd Rahmat Jantan

21 October 2017 Second leg	Kedah	2–0 (3–1 agg.)	(Pahang) FELDA United	Alor Setar
21:00 UTC+08:00	Sandro 71', 86'	Report		Stadium: Darul Aman; Attendance: 23,000; Referee: Muhd Nazmi Nasaruddin

===== Final =====
4 November 2017	Kedah	0–2	Johor Darul Ta'zim	Shah Alam Stadium, Shah Alam
21:20 UTC+8		Report	Aidil 3'; Cabrera 63'	Attendance: 79,740; Referee: Razlan Jeffri Ali

== Statistics ==
=== Squad statistics ===
As of matches played on 4 November 2017.

N	Pos	Nat.	Player	Super League		FA Cup		Malaysia Cup		Total	
N	Pos	Nat.	Player	Apps	Goals	Apps	Goals	Apps	Goals	Apps	Goals
1	GK	(Malaysia)	Hadi	4	–	1	–	2	–	7	–
2	DF	(Malaysia)	Syawal	10	–	5	–	6	–	21	–
3	DF	(Malaysia)	Fitri	18	1	6	1	10	–	34	2
4	DF	(Australia)	Anderson	17	1	5	1	9	–	31	2
5	DF	(Malaysia)	Osman	1	–	–	–	1	–	2	–
7	MF	(Malaysia)	Baddrol	16	9	7	2	10	1	33	12
8	MF	(Kosovo)	Liridon	18	2	6	3	10	3	34	8
9	FW	(Denmark)	Ken Ilsø	18	15	7	5	8	5	33	25
10	MF	(Brazil)	Sandro	18	8	6	1	11	9	35	18
—	DF	(Malaysia)	Raphi	–	–	–	–	–	–	–	–
12	MF	(Malaysia)	Akram	18	1	6	–	6	1	30	2
13	DF	(Malaysia)	Khairul Helmi	18	–	5	–	8	–	31	–
14	FW	(Malaysia)	Fakri	14	–	4	–	5	1	23	1
15	DF	(Malaysia)	Rizal	15	–	6	–	8	–	29	–
16	MF	(Malaysia)	Amirul	13	–	2	–	9	–	24	–
17	MF	(Malaysia)	Syazwan Tajuddin	8	–	2	–	4	–	14	–
18	MF	(Malaysia)	Halim	5	–	4	–	–	–	9	–
19	MF	(Malaysia)	Farhan	9	1	6	3	6	–	21	4
20	FW	(Malaysia)	Syafiq	11	4	4	1	6	1	21	6
21	GK	(Malaysia)	Farhan	7	–	–	–	3	–	10	–
22	MF	(Malaysia)	Syazwan Zainon	16	1	6	–	9	1	31	2
23	MF	(Malaysia)	Hanif	9	–	1	–	2	–	12	–
24	DF	(Malaysia)	Asri	10	1	2	–	1	–	13	1
25	GK	(Malaysia)	Ifwat	15	–	6	–	7	–	28	–
26	FW	(Malaysia)	Syazuan	1	–	–	–	1	–	2	–
27	DF	(Malaysia)	Ariff Farhan	6	1	–	–	9	–	15	1
33	MF	(Malaysia)	Akhyar	3	–	1	–	2	1	6	1
34	FW	(Malaysia)	Akmal Azmi	3	–	–	–	–	–	3	–
35	MF	(Malaysia)	Hidhir	1	–	–	–	1	–	2	–

=== Goalscorers ===
As of matches played on 28 October 2017.

Rank	Player	Position	Super League	FA Cup	Malaysia Cup	Total
1	(Denmark) Ken Ilsø	FW	15	5	5	25
2	(Brazil) Sandro	MF	8	1	9	18
3	(Malaysia) Baddrol	MF	9	2	1	12
4	(Kosovo) Liridon	MF	2	3	3	8
5	(Malaysia) Syafiq	FW	4	1	1	6
6	(Malaysia) Farhan	MF	1	3	–	4
7	(Malaysia) Fitri	DF	1	1	–	2
7	(Australia) Anderson	DF	1	1	–	2
7	(Malaysia) Akram	MF	1	–	1	2
7	(Malaysia) Syazwan	MF	1	–	1	2
11	(Malaysia) Fakri	FW	–	–	1	1
11	(Malaysia) Asri	DF	1	–	–	1
11	(Malaysia) Ariff Farhan	DF	1	–	–	1
11	(Malaysia) Akhyar	MF	–	–	1	1
Own Goal			–	2	1	3
Total			45	19	24	88

=== Clean sheets ===
As of matches played on 28 October 2017.

Rank	N	Player	Super League	FA Cup	Malaysia Cup	Total
1	25	(Malaysia) Ifwat	4	3	4	11
2	21	(Malaysia) Farhan	2	–	1	3
2	1	(Malaysia) Hadi	2	–	2	4

=== Disciplinary record ===
N	P	Nat.	Name	Super League			FA Cup			Malaysia Cup			Total			Notes
N	P	Nat.	Name	Yellow card	Second yellow card	Red card	Yellow card	Second yellow card	Red card	Yellow card	Second yellow card	Red card	Yellow card	Second yellow card	Red card	Notes
2	DF	(Malaysia)	Syawal	1						1			2			
3	DF	(Malaysia)	Fitri	5			3						8			
4	DF	(Australia)	Anderson	2									2			
7	MF	(Malaysia)	Baddrol	2		1							2		1	
8	MF	(Kosovo)	Liridon	5			3			1			9			
9	FW	(Denmark)	Ken Ilsø	2		1	2						4		1	
10	MF	(Brazil)	Sandro	4			2						6			
12	MF	(Malaysia)	Akram	6			1			1			8			
13	DF	(Malaysia)	Khairul Helmi	2			3			2			7			
15	DF	(Malaysia)	Rizal	3		1	4						7		1	
16	MF	(Malaysia)	Amirul	1			1						2			
17	MF	(Malaysia)	Syazwan Tajuddin	1			1						2			
20	FW	(Malaysia)	Syafiq	3			1						4			
22	MF	(Malaysia)	Syazwan Zainon	1									1			
23	MF	(Malaysia)	Hanif	1									1			
24	DF	(Malaysia)	Asri	2									2			
27	DF	(Malaysia)	Ariff Farhan							1			1			

Last updated: 4 November 2017
Source: Matches
Only competitive matches
(yellow card) = Number of bookings; (second yellow card) = Number of sending offs after a second yellow card; (red card) = Number of sending offs by a direct red card.

=== Suspensions ===
A player is automatically suspended for the next match for the following offences:

- Receiving a red card (red card suspensions may be extended for serious offences)
- Receiving two yellow cards in two different matches (FA Cup, Malaysia Cup knockout phase)
- Receiving three yellow cards in three different matches (Super League, Malaysia Cup group stage)

Player	Offence(s)	Suspension(s)
(Malaysia) Fitri	(yellow card) in Super League vs FELDA United (A) (matchday 3; 4 February 2017); (yellow card) in Super League vs T–Team (A) (matchday 11; 15 April 2017); (yellow card) in Super League vs Melaka United (A) (matchday 15; 11 July 2017)	Super League vs Selangor (H) (matchday 16; 15 July 2017)
(Malaysia) Fitri	(yellow card) in FA Cup semi-finals vs Terengganu (H) (first leg; 30 April 2017); (yellow card) in FA Cup final vs Pahang (N) (final; 20 May 2017)	2018 Malaysia FA Cup?
(Kosovo) Liridon	(yellow card) in Super League vs Melaka United (H) (matchday 8; 4 March 2017); (yellow card) in Super League vs PKNS (H) (matchday 10; 8 April 2017); (yellow card) in Super League vs Perak TBG (A) (matchday 9; 26 April 2017)	Super League vs PKNS (A) (matchday 13; 9 May 2017)
(Denmark) Ken Ilsø	(yellow card) in Super League vs FELDA United (A) (matchday 3; 4 February 2017); (yellow card) in Super League vs Penang (H) (matchday 6; 25 February 2017); (yellow card) in Super League vs PKNS (H) (matchday 10; 8 April 2017)	Super League vs T–Team (A) (matchday 11; 15 April 2017)
(Brazil) Sandro	(yellow card) in Super League vs Johor Darul Ta'zim (A) (matchday 1; 20 January 2017); (yellow card) in Super League vs PKNS (H) (matchday 10; 8 April 2017); (yellow card) in Super League vs Perak TBG (H) (matchday 14; 1 July 2017)	Super League vs Melaka United (A) (matchday 15; 11 July 2017)
(Malaysia) Akram	(yellow card) in Super League vs Johor Darul Ta'zim (A) (matchday 1; 20 January 2017); (yellow card) in Super League vs FELDA United (A) (matchday 3; 4 February 2017); (yellow card) in Super League vs Kelantan (A) (matchday 5; 18 February 2017)	Super League vs Penang (H) (matchday 6; 25 February 2017)
(Malaysia) Akram	(yellow card) in Super League vs Selangor (A) (matchday 7; 1 March 2017); (yellow card) in Super League vs Perak TBG (H) (matchday 14; 1 July 2017); (yellow card) in Super League vs Melaka United (A) (matchday 15; 11 July 2017)	Super League vs Selangor (H) (matchday 16; 15 July 2017) ?Super League vs Penang (A) (matchday 17; 22 July 2017)?
(Malaysia) Rizal	(yellow card) in Super League vs Sarawak (H) (matchday 2; 27 January 2017); (yellow card) in Super League vs Pahang (H) (matchday 4; 11 February 2017); (yellow card) in Super League vs Selangor (A) (matchday 7; 1 March 2017)	Super League vs Melaka United (H) (matchday 8; 4 March 2017)
(Malaysia) Rizal	(red card) in Super League vs T–Team (A) (matchday 11; 15 April 2017)	Super League vs Perak TBG (A) (matchday 9; 26 April 2017); Super League vs PKNS (A) (matchday 13; 9 May 2017)
(Malaysia) Rizal	(yellow card) in FA Cup quarter-finals vs PKNP (H) (first leg; 1 April 2017); (yellow card) in FA Cup quarter-finals vs PKNP (A) (second leg; 21 April 2017)	FA Cup semi-finals vs Terengganu (H) (first leg; 30 April 2017)
(Malaysia) Syafiq	(yellow card) in Super League vs Selangor (A) (matchday 7; 1 March 2017); (yellow card) in Super League vs T–Team (A) (matchday 11; 15 April 2017); (yellow card) in Super League vs Pahang (A) (matchday 19; 5 August 2017)	Super League vs FELDA United (H) (matchday 20; 20 September 2017)

As of matches played on 5 August 2017.

=== Summary ===
Games played	40 (22 Super League) (7 FA Cup) (11 Malaysia Cup)
Games won	23 (9 Super League) (6 FA Cup) (8 Malaysia Cup)
Games drawn	9 (8 Super League) (1 Malaysia Cup)
Games lost	8 (5 Super League) (1 FA Cup) (2 Malaysia Cup)
Goals scored	88 (45 Super League) (19 FA Cup) (24 Malaysia Cup)
Goals conceded	49 (33 Super League) (6 FA Cup) (10 Malaysia Cup)
Goal difference	39 (12 Super League) (13 FA Cup) (14 Malaysia Cup)
Clean sheets	18 (8 Super League) (3 FA Cup) (7 Malaysia Cup)
Yellow cards	68 (41 Super League) (21 FA Cup) (6 Malaysia Cup)
Red cards	3 (3 Super League)
Most appearances	(Brazil) Sandro (35 appearances)
Top scorer	(Denmark) Ken Ilsø (25 goals)
Winning percentage	Overall: 23/40 (57.50%)

As of matches played on 4 November 2017.

=== Home attendance ===
==== Matches (all competitions) ====
All matches played at Darul Aman Stadium.

Date	Attendance	Opposition	Score	Competition	Ref.
27 January 2017	25,000	Sarawak	3–2	Super League matchday 2	
11 February 2017	12,000	Pahang	4–1	Super League matchday 4	
14 February 2017	12,000	Kuala Lumpur	4–2	FA Cup round of 32	
25 February 2017	25,000	Penang	3–1	Super League matchday 6	
4 March 2017	25,000	(Malacca) Melaka United	4–0	Super League matchday 8	
1 April 2017	24,500	(Perak) PKNP	6–1	FA Cup quarter-finals	
8 April 2017	20,000	(Selangor) PKNS	1–1	Super League matchday 10	
30 April 2017	22,000	Terengganu	1–0	FA Cup semi-finals	
24 May 2017	10,000	(Terengganu) T-Team	3–0	Super League matchday 12	
1 July 2017	7,656	Perak TBG	2–3	Super League matchday 14	
4 July 2017	4,500	(Malacca) Melaka United	2–0	Malaysia Cup group stage matchday 1	
15 July 2017	18,000	Selangor	1–1	Super League matchday 16	
26 July 2017	11,970	Kelantan	5–0	Super League matchday 18	
1 August 2017	10,300	(Selangor) UiTM	1–0	Malaysia Cup group stage matchday 5	
9 September 2017	10,000	Kelantan	2–0	Malaysia Cup group stage matchday 6	
20 September 2017	4,000	(Kuala Lumpur) Felda United	1–3	Super League matchday 20	
24 September 2017	23,000	Selangor	1–0	Malaysia Cup quarter-finals second leg	
21 October 2017	23,000	(Kuala Lumpur) Felda United	2–0	Malaysia Cup semi-finals second leg	
28 October 2017	3,000	Johor Darul Ta'zim	0–0	Super League matchday 22	

==== Attendance (each competitions) ====
Competitions	Matches	Total attendance	Average attendance
Super League	11	161,626	14,693
FA Cup	3	58,500	19,500
Malaysia Cup	5	70,800	14,160
Total	19	290,926	16,118

== Awards ==
=== Monthly awards ===
For the 2017 season, sponsors collaboration with Kedah FA in recognizing the contributions of players throughout the season. Every month, one player will be selected as the player of the month based on the current performance. Selection is based on the feedback of squad management and fans. Winners will be announced at 8:00 pm at Darul Aman Stadium. The winner will win a plaque, a cash prize of RM500, sporting goods, product vouchers and exclusive poster from the sponsors.

Month	Player	Nationality	Position	Event date	Sponsors
March	Ifwat Akmal	Malaysia	GK	1 April 2017	Le' Sanda Cosmetic, Arena HijauKuning, Paddy Gear
April	Baddrol Bakhtiar	Malaysia	MF	30 April 2017	Le' Sanda Cosmetic, AL Sports, Rangkaian Hotel Seri Malaysia, Winner Plus Energy Drink, Arena HijauKuning, Paddy Gear
July	Ken Ilsø	Denmark	FW	1 August 2017	Le' Sanda Cosmetic, Rangkaian Hotel Seri Malaysia, Adelia, Winner Plus Energy Drink, Arena HijauKuning, Paddy Gear

Winners are listed first, highlighted in boldface, and indicated with a double dagger (‡).

**Player of the Month: March**: **Ifwat Akmal – (7,556 votes)**‡; Baddrol Bakhtiar – (1,702 votes); Liridon Krasniqi – (808 votes); Ken Ilsø – (201 votes); Rizal Ghazali – (192 votes); Zac Anderson – (134 votes); Akram Mahinan – (126 votes)	**Player of the Month: April**: **Baddrol Bakhtiar – (6,192 votes)**‡; Halim Saari – (474 votes); Akram Mahinan – (182 votes); Ken Ilsø – (116 votes); Sandro da Silva – (73 votes)	**Player of the Month: July**: **Ken Ilsø – (5,444 votes)**‡; Sandro da Silva – (3,131 votes); Baddrol Bakhtiar – (2,699 votes); Liridon Krasniqi – (1,589 votes); Syazwan Zainon – (1,287 votes); Rizal Ghazali – (1,250 votes); Farhan Abu Bakar – (1,101 votes); Khairul Helmi – (1,073 votes); Fitri Omar – (1,034 votes); Syawal Nordin – (960 votes)
