= Abdul Halim Saari =

Malaysian footballer (born 1994)

Abdul Halim
Personal information
- Full name: Abdul Halim bin Saari
- Date of birth: 14 November 1994 (age 31)
- Place of birth: Kulim, Kedah, Malaysia
- Height: 1.78 m (5 ft 10 in)
- Position: Central midfielder

Youth career
- 2015: Kedah U21

Senior career*
Years	Team	Apps	(Gls)
2016–2018	Kedah	26	(1)
2019–2022	Selangor	31	(0)
2023–2024	Kedah Darul Aman		
2025–2026	Immigration		

International career^{‡}
2019–	Malaysia	5	(0)
- * Club domestic league appearances and goals ‡ National team caps and goals as of 10 October 2019

Abdul Halim bin Saari (born 14 November 1994) is a Malaysian professional footballer who plays as central midfielder. Abdul Halim played for Kedah U21 team before been promoted to the senior team in 2016.

== Career statistics ==
=== Club ===
As of match played 30 November 2022

Club	Season	League		Cup		League Cup		Continental		Total	
Club	Season	Apps	Goals	Apps	Goals	Apps	Goals	Apps	Goals	Apps	Goals
Kedah	2016	11	1	2	0	5	0	–	–	18	1
Kedah	2017	5	0	4	0	0	0	–	–	9	0
Kedah	2018	10	0	0	0	0	0	–	–	10	0
Kedah	Total	26	1	6	0	5	0	0	0	37	1
Selangor	2019	19	0	1	0	7	0	–	–	27	0
Selangor	2020	9	0	0	0	1	0	–	–	10	0
Selangor	2021	2	0	0	0	0	0	–	–	2	0
Selangor	2022	0	0	0	0	0	0	–	–	0	0
Selangor	Total	30	0	1	0	8	0	0	0	39	0
Career total		56	0	7	0	13	0	0	0	76	1

=== International ===
As of match played 10 September 2019

Appearances and goals by national team and year
National team	Year	Apps	Goals
Malaysia
Malaysia	2019	5	0
Total		5	0

== Honours ==
=== Club ===
Kedah Darul Aman

- Malaysian FA Cup: 2017
- Malaysia Cup: 2016, Runner up:2017
- Malaysia Charity Shield: 2017

Selangor

- Malaysia Cup: Runner Up:2022
