= Farhan Roslan =

Malaysian footballer

Personal information
- Full name: Muhammad Farhan bin Roslan
- Date of birth: 3 December 1996 (age 29)
- Place of birth: Alor Setar, Kedah, Malaysia
- Height: 1.54 m (5 ft 1 in)
- Positions: Attacking midfielder; winger

Team information
- Current team: Sabah
- Number: 8

Youth career
- 2013: Kedah Darul Aman U21

Senior career*
Years	Team	Apps	(Gls)
2014–2021	Kedah Darul Aman	71	(6)
2021	→ Perak (loan)	8	(1)
2022	Kelantan	6	(1)
2022	→ Sabah (loan)	11	(1)
2023–	Sabah	41	(4)
Total		126	(13)

International career^{‡}
2014–2015	Malaysia U21		
2015–2017	Malaysia U23	8	(0)
2019–	Malaysia	1	(0)
- * Club domestic league appearances and goals as of 22 October 2022 ‡ National team caps and goals as of 9 November 2019

Muhammad Farhan bin Roslan (born 3 December 1996) is a Malaysian footballer who plays for Sabah FC in the Malaysia Super League as an attacking midfielder.

== Club career ==
=== Kedah Darul Aman ===
He was registered and played with the Kedah President's Cup team in 2013 and also played for Kedah futsal team. In the next seasons, he was called up by Kedah's head coach, Ian Gillan for Kedah senior team for 2014 Malaysia Premier League. Farhan signed a three-year deal which ends in 2017.

== International career ==
Farhan received national call-up for international friendly match after he put in some promising performances in the Malaysia Cup. But he was never selected for the AFF Suzuki Cup squad by coach Dollah Salleh.

== Career statistics ==
=== Club ===
As of 23 December 2024

Appearances and goals by club, season and competition
Club	Season	League			Cup		League Cup		Continental		Total	
Club	Season	Division	Apps	Goals	Apps	Goals	Apps	Goals	Apps	Goals	Apps	Goals
Kedah Darul Aman	2014	Malaysia Premier League	7	1	0	0	9	2	—		16	3
Kedah Darul Aman	2015	Malaysia Premier League	18	2	1	1	11	1	—		30	4
Kedah Darul Aman	2016	Malaysia Super League	17	1	5	1	10	0	—		32	2
Kedah Darul Aman	2017	Malaysia Super League	9	1	6	3	6	0	—		21	4
Kedah Darul Aman	2018	Malaysia Super League	5	0	2	0	0	0	—		7	0
Kedah Darul Aman	2019	Malaysia Super League	14	1	6	1	10	2	—		30	4
Kedah Darul Aman	2020	Malaysia Super League	1	0	0	0	0	0	1	0	2	0
Kedah Darul Aman	Total		71	6	20	6	46	5	1	0	138	17
Perak (loan)	2021	Malaysia Super League	8	1	–		0	0	–		8	1
Perak (loan)	Total		8	1	–		0	0	–		8	1
Kelantan	2022	Malaysia Premier League	6	1	1	0	–		–		7	1
Kelantan	Total		6	1	1	0	–		–		7	1
Sabah	2022	Malaysia Super League	11	1	1	0	6	1	–		18	2
Sabah	2023	Malaysia Super League	12	1	0	0	3	0	1	1	16	2
Sabah	2024-25	Malaysia Super League	18	2	1	0	4	1	–		23	3
Sabah	Total		41	4	2	0	13	2	1	1	57	7
Career total			126	12	23	6	59	7	2	1	210	26

== Honour ==
=== Club ===
Kedah Darul Aman

- Malaysia Premier League: 2015
- Malaysian FA Cup: 2017, 2019
- Malaysia Cup: 2016
- Malaysia Charity Shield: 2017

=== Individual ===
- Malaysia Best Young Players: 2014
