= Syazwan Zainon =

Malaysian footballer

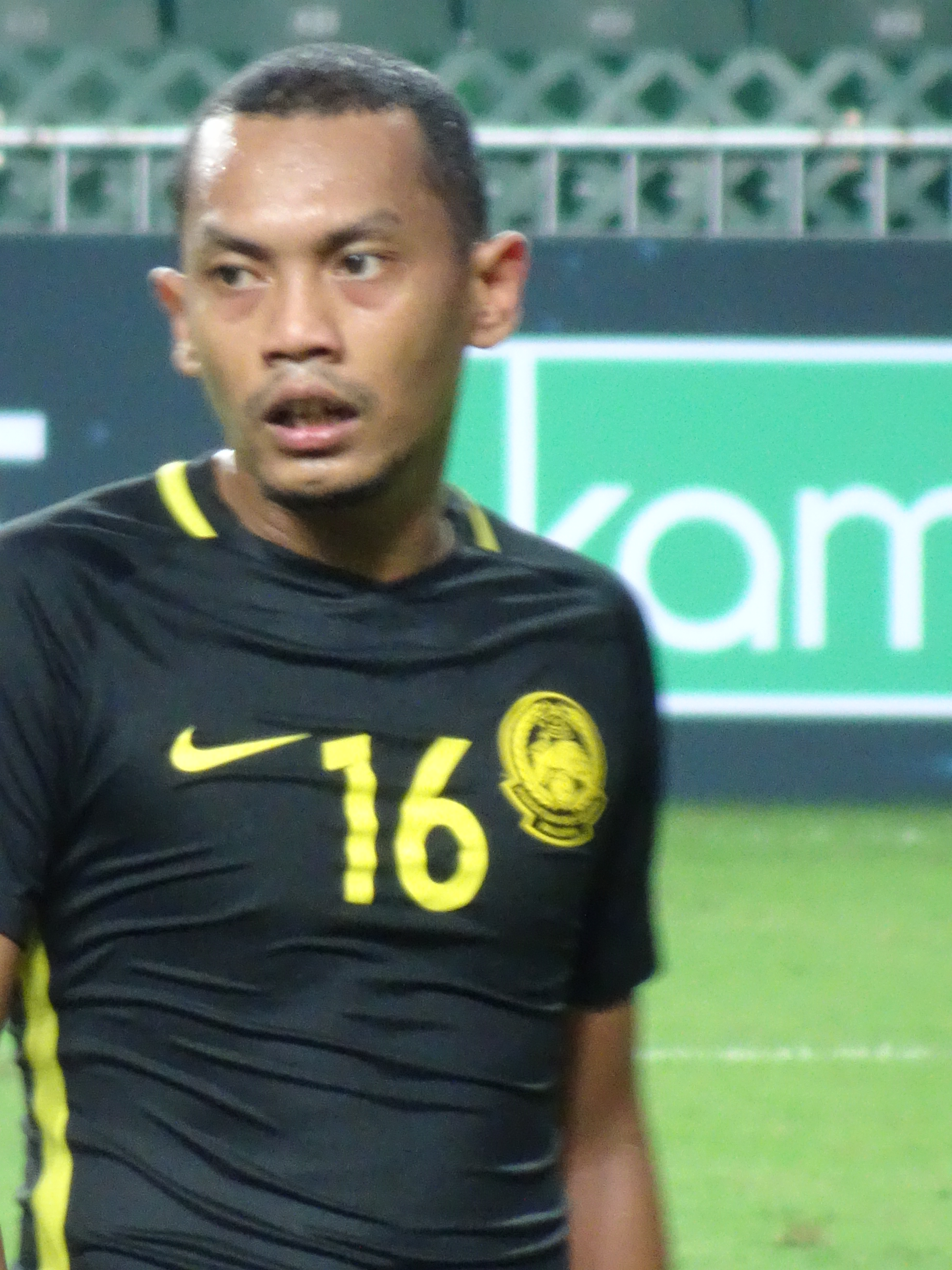

Personal information
- Full name: Mohd Syazwan bin Zainon
- Date of birth: 13 November 1989 (age 36)
- Place of birth: Perlis, Malaysia
- Height: 1.69 m (5 ft 7 in)
- Position: Winger

Team information
- Current team: Kuala Perlis Titans
- Number: 22

Youth career
- Bukit Jalil Sports School
- 2006–2007: Perlis Youth
- 2008: Harimau Muda

Senior career*
Years	Team	Apps	(Gls)
2009–2010	Perlis	0	(3)
2011	Felda United	21	(1)
2012	Johor FC	12	(2)
2013	Felda United	7	(0)
2013	→ Kedah Darul Aman (loan)		
2014–2018	Kedah Darul Aman	86	(9)
2019–2020	Selangor	23	(1)
2021–2022	Kedah Darul Aman	27	(2)
2023	Kelantan United	18	(3)
2024–2025	PT Athletic		
2025–	Kuala Perlis Titans		

International career
2016–	Malaysia	18	(2)
Medal record
Men's football
Representing Malaysia
AFF Championship
Runner-up	2018
- * Club domestic league appearances and goals

Mohd Syazwan bin Zainon (born 13 November 1989) is a Malaysian professional footballer who currently plays for Malaysia A2 Amateur League club Kuala Perlis Titans.

== Early life ==
Born and raised in Utan Aji, Kangar in state of northern Malaysia Perlis, Syazwan got his early education at Sekolah Menengah Kebangsaan Syed Alwi in Kayang, Perlis. Syazwan later moved to Bukit Jalil Sports School in Kuala Lumpur to further his studies.

== Club career ==
Syazwan signed one-year deal with Felda United in 2010 moves from Perlis. In December 2011, Syazwan signed with Johor FC to play in 2012 Malaysia Super League.

=== Kedah ===
In April 2013 it was announced that Syazwan would be joining Kedah on loan after not getting a spot in the Felda United first eleven. Syazwan later permanently joined Kedah for 2014 season. Syazwan made his competitive debut for Kedah in a 4–1 win over Perlis on 24 January 2017. He scored a goal in that match and total 4 goals in 2014 Malaysia Premier League season. He helped his club to win the 2015 Malaysia Premier League and has been promoted to the 2016 Malaysia Super League.

On 20 May 2017, in Malaysia FA Cup final, Syazwan made an assist for Ken Ilsø opening goal of Kedah. The match ended Kedah won 3–2 and Syazwan has helped his team win the second trophy this season after winning the Sultan Haji Ahmad Shah Cup earlier this season.

=== Selangor ===
On 7 November 2018, Syazwan announced that a transfer agreement had been reached with Selangor, allowing him to join the Red Giants side for the 2019 season. Financial details of the deal were not immediately available, but the transfer was for an undisclosed fee.

== International career ==
In September 2016, Syazwan received his first national team call-up for the international friendlies against Singapore and Afghanistan. He made his debut for Malaysia against Afghanistan on 11 October 2016, before he being substitute to Hadin Azman in the 19th minute.

=== International goals ===
Scores and results list Malaysia's goal tally first.

#	Date	Venue	Opponent	Score	Result	Competition
1.	20 November 2016	Thuwunna Stadium, Yangon, Myanmar	Cambodia	1–1	3–2	2016 AFF Championship
2.	5 September 2017	Hang Jebat Stadium, Malacca, Malaysia	Hong Kong	1–1	1–1	2019 AFC Asian Cup qualification

== Career statistics ==
=== Club ===
As of 15 October 2022

Malaysia			League		Cup		League Cup		Asia		Total	
Season	Club	League	Apps	Goals	Apps	Goals	Apps	Goals	Apps	Goals	Apps	Goals
2009	Perlis	Malaysia Super League	0	2	0	0	0	0	–		0	0
2010	Perlis	Malaysia Super League	0	1	0	0	0	0	–		0	0
Total			0	3	0	0	0	0	0	0	0	0
2011	Felda United	Malaysia Super League	21	1	0	0	0	0	–		0	0
Total			21	1	0	0	0	0	0	0	0	0
2012	Johor FC	Malaysia Super League	12	2	0	0	0	0	–		0	0
Total			12	2	0	0	0	0	0	0	0	0
2013	Felda United	Malaysia Super League	7	0	0	0	0	0	–		0	0
Total			7	0	0	0	0	0	0	0	0	0
2013	Kedah (loan)	Malaysia Premier League	0	0	0	0	0	0	–		0	0
Total			0	0	0	0	0	0	0	0	0	0
2014	Kedah	Malaysia Premier League	19	4	0	0	0	1	–		0	5
2015	Kedah	Malaysia Premier League	17	1	0	0	11	1	–		28	2
2016	Kedah	Malaysia Super League	17	1	3	2	11	1	–		31	4
2017	Kedah	Malaysia Super League	16	1	6	0	9	1	–		31	2
2018	Kedah	Malaysia Super League	17	2	1	0	6	0	–		24	2
Total			86	9	11	2	37	4	0	0	134	15
2019	Selangor	Malaysia Super League	16	1	2	1	7	2	–		25	4
2020	Selangor	Malaysia Super League	7	0	–		0	0	–		7	0
Total			23	1	2	1	7	2	0	0	32	4
2021	Kedah	Malaysia Super League	14	2	–		6	3	–		20	5
2022	Kedah	Malaysia Super League	13	0	0	0	0	0	3	0	16	0
Total			27	2	0	0	6	3	3	0	36	5
Career total			0	0	0	0	0	0	0	0	0	0

=== International ===
As of 12 November 2018

Appearances and goals by national team and year
National team	Year	Apps	Goals
Malaysia	2016	5	1
Malaysia	2017	4	1
Malaysia	2018	8	0
Total		17	2

== Honours ==
Kedah Darul Aman

- Malaysia Premier League: 2015
- Malaysia Cup: 2016
- Malaysia Charity Shield: 2017, runner-up 2018
- Malaysia FA Cup: 2017

Selangor

- Malaysia FA Cup: 2018 runner-up

International

Malaysia U-20

- AFF U-20 Youth Championship: 2007 runner-up

Malaysia

- AFF Championship: 2018 runner-up
