= Syawal Nordin =

Malaysian footballer

Personal information
- Full name: Mohamad Syawal bin Nordin
- Date of birth: 25 March 1993 (age 33)
- Place of birth: Baling, Malaysia
- Height: 1.78 m (5 ft 10 in)
- Positions: Centre back; right back

Team information
- Current team: Piuu Fc
- Number: 24

Youth career
- 2011–2015: Harimau Muda B
- 2015: Harimau Muda

Senior career*
Years	Team	Apps	(Gls)
2011–2015	Harimau Muda B	61	(2)
2015	Harimau Muda	19	(0)
2016–2019	Kedah	24	(0)
2020–	Langkawi City		

International career^{‡}
- Malaysia U22
- * Club domestic league appearances and goals as of March 24, 2020 ‡ National team caps and goals as of June 14, 2017

Mohamad Syawal bin Nordin (born 25 March 1993) is a Malaysian professional footballer who plays as a centre back for Langkawi City.

== Career statistics ==
=== Club ===
As of 10 August 2018

Club	Season	League		Cup		League Cup		Continental		Total	
Club	Season	Apps	Goals	Apps	Goals	Apps	Goals	Apps	Goals	Apps	Goals
Kedah	2016	2	0	0	0	6	0	–		8	0
Kedah	2017	10	0	5	0	6	0	–		26	0
Kedah	2018	12	0	0	0	1	0	–		11	0
Kedah	Total	24	0	5	0	13	0	0	0	43	0
Career total		0	0	0	0	0	0	0	0	0	0

== Honours ==
=== Club ===
Kedah

- Malaysia FA Cup: 2017, 2019
- Malaysia Cup: 2016
- Malaysia Charity Shield: 2017
