= Mohd Fitri Omar =

Malaysian footballer

Fitri Omar
Personal information
- Full name: Muhammad Fitri bin Omar
- Date of birth: 25 June 1985 (age 41)
- Place of birth: Sabak Bernam, Selangor, Malaysia
- Height: 1.76 m (5 ft 9 1/2 in)
- Positions: Wingback; winger; forward

Youth career
- 2000–2001: Bukit Jalil Sports School
- 2002–2004: Selangor

Senior career*
Years	Team	Apps	(Gls)
2005–2008	Johor	39	(8)
2009	Kelantan	6	(0)
2010	Muar	21	(19)
2011–ko2014	ATM	52	(6)
2014–2015	Kelantan	16	(0)
2016	Penang	16	(1)
2017	Kedah	18	(1)
2018	Terengganu	12	(0)
2019	Kuala Lumpur City	11	(0)
2020	Petaling Jaya City FC	3	(0)
2021	Kelantan United	12	(0)

International career^{‡}
2013–	Malaysia	4	(0)
- * Club domestic league appearances and goals as of 1 Januari 2021 ‡ National team caps and goals as of 22 August 2017

Muhammad Fitri bin Omar (born 25 June 1985) is a Malaysian professional footballer who plays as a left back and left winger.

Fitri played at the now defunct club MP Muar as a striker, where he was the top scorer and Golden Boot winner of 2011 Malaysia Premier League with 19 goals. He made his international debut in a friendly match against China PR in October 2013.

== Club career ==
=== Kelantan ===
In April 2014, during the second transfer window, Fitri signed a contract with Kelantan. He made his debut for Kelantan during the match against Johor Darul Ta'zim after a substitution for Shakir Ali who injured in the first half. His side loses 1–2 after a goal from Fazly Mazlan at the last minute. On 18 April 2014, he was seen had a fight with Sarawak player Muamer Salibašić during the match between Kelantan vs Sarawak which ended with Kelantan lose to Sarawak 0–1, Sarawak win by the only goal scored by Ryan Griffiths.

=== Kedah ===
On 2 December 2016, Fitri left Penang and signed one-year contract with Kedah for 2017 season.

== Career statistics ==
=== Club ===
As of 27 June 2018

Club	Season	League		Cup		League Cup		Continental		Total	
Club	Season	Apps	Goals	Apps	Goals	Apps	Goals	Apps	Goals	Apps	Goals
Kelantan	2014	0	0	0	0	5	0	–	–	5	0
Kelantan	2015	16	0	2	0	1	0	–	–	17	1
Kelantan	Total	0	0	0	0	0	0	0	0	0	0
Penang	2016	16	1	1	0	–				19	0
Penang	Total	16	1	1	0	0	0	0	0	19	1
Kedah	2017	18	1	6	1	10	0	–		34	2
Kedah	Total	18	1	6	1	0	0	0	0	34	2
Terengganu	2018	11	0	1	0	0	0	–		12	0
Terengganu	Total	11	1	0	0	0	0	0	0	12	0
Career Total		0	0	0	0	0	0	0	0	0	0

=== International ===
As of match played 5 July 2018.

National team	Year	Apps	Goals
Malaysia
Malaysia	2013	3	0
Malaysia	2017	1	0
Malaysia	Total	4	0

== Honours ==
=== Club ===
ATM

- Malaysia Premier League: 2012
- Malaysia Charity Shield: 2013
- Malaysia Cup: Runner-up 2012

Kelantan

- Malaysia FA Cup: Runner-up 2009, 2015

Kedah

- Malaysia Charity Shield: 2017
- Malaysia FA Cup: 2017

=== International ===
Malaysia U-19

- AFF U-19 Youth Championship : 2003 runner-up

=== Individual ===
- Malaysia Premier League Golden Boot : 2011 (19 goals)
