= Sandro (footballer, born October 1983) =

Brazilian footballer

Personal information
- Full name: Sandro da Silva Mendonça
- Date of birth: 1 October 1983 (age 43)
- Place of birth: Fortaleza, Brazil
- Height: 1.76 m (5 ft 9 in)
- Position: Attacking midfielder

Team information
- Current team: Kyrgyzstan (assistant)

Senior career*
| Years | Team | Apps | (Gls) |
| 2005–2006 | Parana | 44 | (11) |
| 2006–2010 | Gençlerbirliği | 34 | (2) |
| 2007–2009 | → Hacettepe (loan) | 47 | (8) |
| 2010 | Coritiba | 6 | (0) |
| 2010 | Avaí | 21 | (0) |
| 2011–2012 | Sivasspor | 9 | (0) |
| 2013 | Operário | 20 | (2) |
| 2013 | Daegu | 15 | (1) |
| 2014 | Bragantino | 28 | (6) |
| 2015 | ABC | 9 | (0) |
| 2015–2018 | Kedah | 59 | (27) |
| 2019–2020 | Selangor | 29 | (12) |
| 2021 | Sarawak United FC | 24 | (5) |

Managerial career
- 2022: Kyrgyzstan (assistant)
- * Club domestic league appearances and goals as of 21:40, 3 August 2021 (UTC)

Sandro da Silva Mendonça (born 1 October 1983), or simply Sandro is a Brazilian football player who plays as an attacking midfielder.

== Club career ==
=== Kedah ===
On 9 April 2015 Sandro signed a contract with Malaysian side club Kedah. He made 27 appearances and 17 goals during his season debut.

== Career statistics ==
=== Club ===
As of 8 November 2020.

Appearances and goals by club, season and competition
| Club | Season | League | | | Cup | | League Cup | | Total | |
| Club | Season | Division | Apps | Goals | Apps | Goals | Apps | Goals | Apps | Goals |
|---|---|---|---|---|---|---|---|---|---|---|
| Kedah | 2015 | Malaysia Premier League | 16 | 9 | 0 | 0 | 11 | 8 | 27 | 17 |
| Kedah | 2016 | Malaysia Super League | 7 | 1 | 5 | 2 | 0 | 0 | 12 | 3 |
| Kedah | 2017 | Malaysia Super League | 18 | 8 | 6 | 1 | 11 | 9 | 35 | 18 |
| Kedah | 2018 | Malaysia Super League | 18 | 8 | 2 | 0 | 6 | 4 | 26 | 12 |
| Kedah | Total | | 59 | 26 | 13 | 3 | 28 | 21 | 100 | 50 |
| Selangor | 2019 | Malaysia Super League | 18 | 8 | 2 | 0 | 6 | 1 | 26 | 9 |
| Selangor | 2020 | Malaysia Super League | 11 | 4 | 0 | 0 | 1 | 1 | 12 | 5 |
| Selangor | Total | | 29 | 12 | 2 | 0 | 7 | 2 | 38 | 14 |
| Career total | | | 0 | 0 | 0 | 0 | 0 | 0 | 0 | 0 |

== Honours ==
=== Club ===
Kedah FA

- Malaysia Premier League : 2015
- Malaysia FA Cup : 2017
- Malaysia Cup : 2016
- Malaysia Charity Shield : 2017

=== Individual ===
- PFAM Player of the Month: September 2015
