= Ahmad Fakri Saarani =

Malaysian footballer

Personal information
- Full name: Ahmad Fakri Bin Saarani
- Date of birth: 8 July 1989 (age 37)
- Place of birth: Kota Bharu, Kelantan, Malaysia
- Height: 1.73 m (5 ft 8 in)
- Positions: Winger; forward

Youth career
- 2006: Perak President Cup

Senior career*
Years	Team	Apps	(Gls)
2006–2007	Perak	4	(4)
2007–2008	Harimau Muda	24	(9)
2009–2010	Perlis	25	(13)
2011	Negeri Sembilan	14	(2)
2012	Atlético	36	(23)
2013–2015	Kelantan	32	(20)
2016–2017	Kedah	24	(12)
2016	→ Felda United (loan)	8	(0)
2018	Melaka United	11	(0)
2019	Kuala Lumpur	8	(0)
2020–2021	Northern Lions F.C.		
2021	Kelana United F.C.	4	(2)
2021	BRM FC	2	(2)

International career^{‡}
2006–2009	Malaysia U-20	17	(7)
2009–2011	Malaysia U-23	28	(6)
2009–2016	Malaysia	35	(2)
Medal record
Malaysia U-23
Sea Games
Gold medal – first place	2011 Jakarta	Football
Gold medal – first place	2009 Vientiane	Football
Malaysia U-20
AFF U20
Runner-up	2007 Vietnam
Runner-up	2006 Malaysia
- * Club domestic league appearances and goals ‡ National team caps and goals as of 17 November 2016

Ahmad Fakri bin Saarani (born 8 July 1989) is a former Malaysian professional footballer who played for the Malaysia national team. Fakri played mainly as a right winger but also as a forward. Fakri has earned 30 caps for the Malaysia national team since making his international debut on 12 August 2009 at the age of 19.

== Club career ==
=== Perak, Harimau Muda ===
Fakri has been training with the senior team for the past two months. And I think the time is right for him to come into the picture. This is the right time to blood him although many may question my decision. It does not matter if we are playing at home. The fans may not like it if he makes mistakes but I have faith in the youngster. Fakri seems to handle pressure well and is confident of his game. He played for the national Under-19 team in a tournament in Brunei recently. I try to bring in the young players at the proper time. This is Fakri's chance to prove his worth under my rotation system. I have been losing players to the national squads at all levels and we have to learn to cope without them.

— Steve Darby, former Perak coach.

Fakri was born in Kota Bharu. He has been raised in Batu Gajah, Perak. He started his professional career with Perak when he signed a three-year contract from 2007 until 2009. At the beginning, Fakri was a natural right winger. He played for Perak youth team during his season debut.

Fakri was promoted to Perak first team as the senior striker R. Surendran was away for national duty with the Malaysia national team on a playing tour of Sri Lanka. It was Steve Darby, the former Perak coach, who brought him into the senior team. On 24 March 2007, Fakri made his Liga Super debut in a 5–1 win against Negeri Sembilan. He scored a hat-trick and made one assist during the match.

In the following season, Fakri signed a one-year contract with Harimau Muda A in 2007–08 Liga Premier. He made 24 appearances and scored 9 goals for the club.

=== Perlis, Negeri Sembilan, Felda United ===
After two seasons for Perlis, in December 2010 Fakri signed a contract with Negeri Sembilan. In 2012, Fakri was named as Felda United's new player.

=== Atlético SC ===
On 8 December 2012, it was confirmed that Fakri had signed a one-year contract with Terceira Divisão side Atlético SC.

=== Kelantan ===
Fakri had returned to Malaysia and signed with Kelantan after his contract with Atlético SC ended. On 19 April 2013, Fakri scored his first league goal for Kelantan in 1–2 defeat to PKNS. On 31 August 2013, he scored his first Malaysia Cup goal in a 1–2 defeat to Negeri Sembilan. Fakri played as a substitute in the 2013 Malaysia Cup final against Pahang.

=== Kedah ===
On 1 January 2016, Fakri signed a one-year contract with the 2015 Malaysia Premier League champions Kedah. On 14 December 2016, after his loan stint with Felda United ended, Fakri returned to Kedah and signed another one-year contract.

=== Felda United (loan) ===
On 16 July 2016, Fakri was loaned to Felda United on a 6-month deal.

=== Melaka United ===
On 24 November 2017, Fakri signed a one-year contract with Melaka United.

== International career ==
=== Youth ===
Fakri is former Malaysia Under-20 member squad. He has participated in ASEAN Football Federation Youth Championship 2006 and ASEAN Football Federation Youth Championship 2007. He also play in 2007 Hassanal Bolkiah Trophy. In 2008, Fakri was seconded to Harimau Muda, a Malaysian Premier League team made up of members of the Malaysian Under-20 national side.

=== Senior ===
Fakri made his senior debut in 0–0 draw against Kenya on 12 August 2009, coming off from the bench. In November 2010, Malaysia coach K. Rajagobal called up Fakri for the 2010 AFF Suzuki Cup, but he was ruled out by injury during the 2010 Asian Games. He was replaced by Ashari Samsudin.

He was selected by Malaysia coach, K. Rajagobal for 2012 AFF Suzuki Cup campaign. However, he only came in as a substitute in Group B match against Indonesia.

== Personal life ==
Fakri has a younger sister, Nur Haniza Saarani, playing for the Malaysia women's football team.

== Statistics ==
=== Club ===
As of match played 26 June 2018

Appearances and goals by club, season and competition
Club	Season	League			Cup		League Cup		Continental		Total	
Club	Season	Division	Apps	Goals	Apps	Goals	Apps	Goals	Apps	Goals	Apps	Goals
Perak	2006-07	Malaysia Super League	4	4	0	0	0	0	–	–	0	0
Total			4	4	0	0	0	0	–	–	0	0
Harimau Muda	2007-08	Malaysia Premier League	24	9	0	0	0	0	–	–	0	0
Total			24	9	0	0	0	0	–	–	0	0
Perlis	2009	Malaysia Super League	13	7	0	0	0	0	–	–	0	0
Perlis	2010	Malaysia Super League	12	6	0	0	0	0	–	–	0	0
Total			25	13	0	0	0	0	–	–	0	0
Negeri Sembilan	2011	Malaysia Super League	14	2	0	0	0	0	–	–	0	2
Total			14	2	0	0	0	0	–	–	0	2
Felda United	2012	Malaysia Super League	11	2	0	0	0	2	–	–	11	4
Felda United (loan)	2016	Malaysia Super League	8	0	0	0	0	0	–	–	8	0
Total			19	2	0	0	0	0	–	–	0	0
Atlético SC	2012–13	Terceira Divisão	5	0	0	0	0	0	–	–	5	0
Total			5	0	0	0	0	0	–	–	5	0
Kelantan	2013	Malaysia Super League	11	1	1	0	1	0	–	–	13	1
Kelantan	2014	Malaysia Super League	11 (Note: League appearance for 2014 might inccorect, data based on infobox only)	4	0	2	0	3	–	–	0	9
Kelantan	2015	Malaysia Super League	10	1	3	0	6	0	–	–	19	1
Total			32	6	0	2	0	3	–	–	0	11
Kedah	2016	Malaysia Super League	10	1	6	1	0	0	–	–	16	2
Kedah	2017	Malaysia Super League	14	0	4	0	5	1	–	–	23	1
Total			24	1	10	1	5	1	–	–	39	3
Melaka United	2018	Malaysia Super League	11	0	1	0	0	0	–	–	12	0
Total			11	0	1	0	0	0	–	–	12	0
Career Total			158	37	0	0	0	0	–	–	0	0

=== International ===
As of 13 November 2017

Appearances and goals by national team and year
National team	Year	Apps	Goals
Malaysia	2009	9	0
Malaysia	2010	3	0
Malaysia	2011	5	0
Malaysia	2012	4	1
Malaysia	2013	2	0
Malaysia	2014	4	1
Malaysia	2015	2	0
Malaysia	2016	6	0
Total		35	2

==== International goals ====
As of match played 9 November 2017. Malaysia score listed first, score column indicates score after each Fakri goal.

International goals by date, venue, cap, opponent, score, result and competition
No.	Date	Venue	Cap	Opponent	Score	Result	Competition
1	16 October 2012	Mong Kok Stadium, Mong Kok, Hong Kong	18	Hong Kong	3–0	3–0	Friendly
2	5 March 2014	Tahnoun bin Mohammed Stadium, Al Ain, United Arab Emirates	25	Yemen	2–1	2–1	2015 AFC Asian Cup qualification

== Honours ==
=== Club ===
Perak U-21

- Malaysia President Cup: 2006–07

Kelantan

- Malaysia FA Cup: 2013; Runner-up 2015
- Malaysia Cup: Runner-up 2013

Kedah

- Malaysia Cup: 2016
- Malaysia Charity Shield : 2017
- Malaysian FA Cup: 2017

=== International ===
Malaysia U-20

- AFF U-20 Youth Championship : runner-up 2006, 2007

Malaysia U-23

- SEA Games (2): 2009, 2011
