= Khairul Helmi Johari =

Malaysian footballer (born 1988)

Khairul Helmi
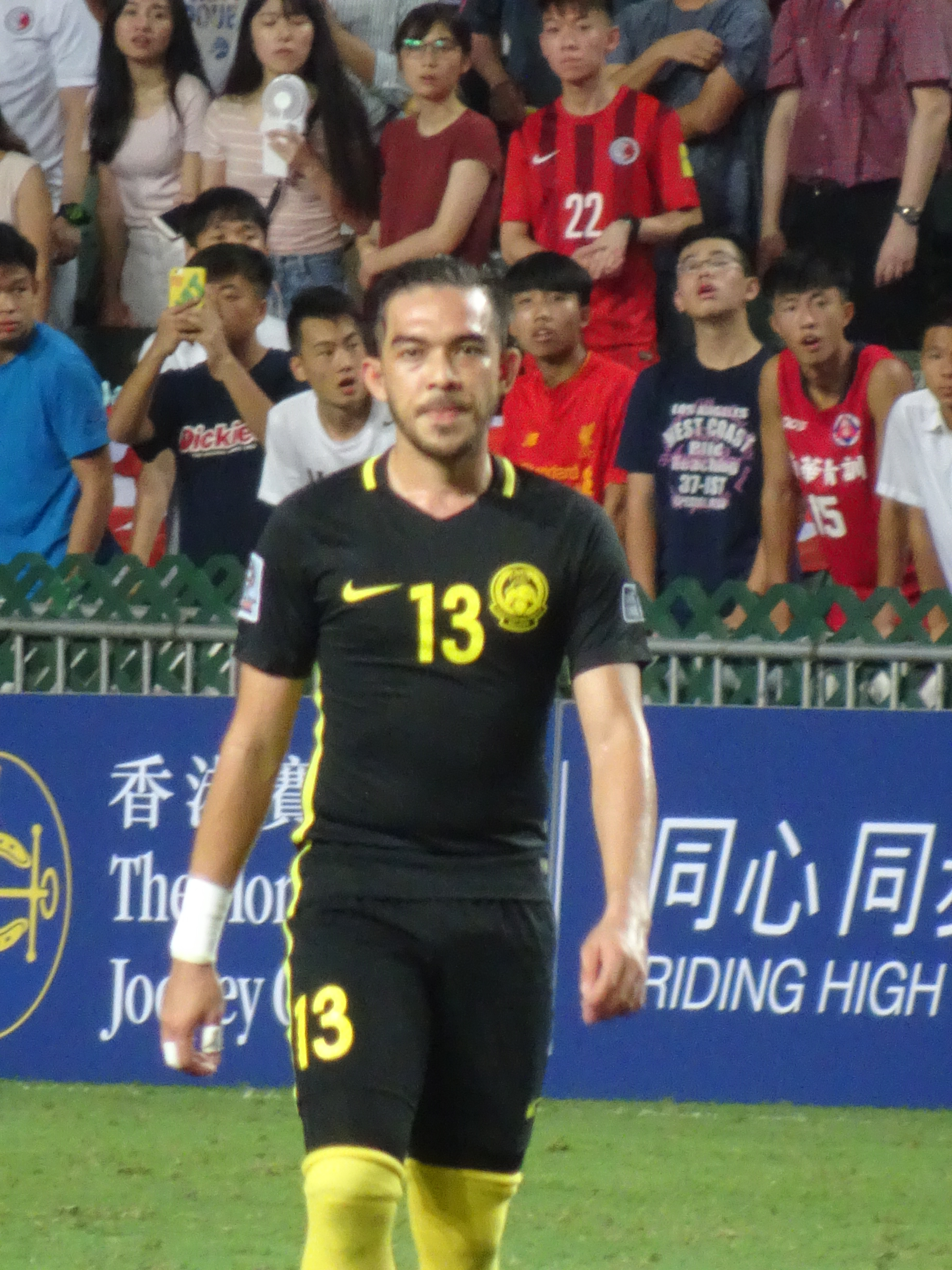

Personal information
- Full name: Khairul Helmi Bin Johari
- Date of birth: 31 March 1988 (age 38)
- Place of birth: Kedah, Malaysia
- Height: 1.72 m (5 ft 8 in)
- Position: Defender

Team information
- Current team: Kelantan
- Number: 3

Youth career
- 2006–2007: Kedah Darul Aman U-19

Senior career*
Years	Team	Apps	(Gls)
2007–2020	Kedah Darul Aman	93	(4)
2021	Melaka United	8	(0)
2022–2024	Kelantan	21	(0)
2024	Kedah Darul Aman		

International career^{‡}
2010–2011	Malaysia U-23	5	(0)
2010–2017	Malaysia	5	(0)
Medal record
Men's Football
Representing Malaysia
Asean Football Championship
Winner	2010
- * Club domestic league appearances and goals as of 17 November 2022 ‡ National team caps and goals as of 29 August 2017

Khairul Helmi Bin Johari (born 31 March 1988 in Sungai Petani, Kedah) is a former Malaysian footballer who most recently played for Malaysia Super League club Kelantan and the Malaysia national team. Khairul plays mainly as a centre-back. He is known as Keon among his teammates and fans.

== Career ==
Khairul played for the Kedah youth team and in the President Cup. Khairul was promoted from the youth team to the senior team along with his friends Rozaidi Rahim and Hazwan Zainun starting from the 2007/08 M-League season. He signed his professional contract in November 2007. However, after this, Khairul was plagued by injuries.

In November 2010, Khairul was called up to the Malaysia national squad by coach K. Rajagopal for the 2010 AFF Suzuki Cup. He did not play any games at the tournament as Malaysia won the 2010 AFF Suzuki Cup title for the first time in their history.

In October 2016, Khairul was once again called up to the National football team for a Class A Friendly match against Singapore. He made his senior debut and started with the number 25 shirt during the match, which ended up as a 1–1 draw.

Khairul Helmi Johari is part of the e-Sports team "Skondoi Kingdom", where he plays Valorant and also CSGO in a pro league.

== Career statistics ==
=== Club ===
As of match played 21 September 2022

Appearances and goals by club, season and competition
Club	Season	League			Cup		League Cup		Continental		Total	
Club	Season	Division	Apps	Goals	Apps	Goals	Apps	Goals	Apps	Goals	Apps	Goals
Kedah Darul Aman	2006-07	Malaysia Super League	0	0	0	0	0	0	–		0	0
Kedah Darul Aman	2007-08	Malaysia Super League	0	0	0	0	0	0	0	0	0	0
Kedah Darul Aman	2009	Malaysia Super League	0	0	0	0	0	0	0	0	0	0
Kedah Darul Aman	2010	Malaysia Super League	0	0	0	0	0	0	–		0	0
Kedah Darul Aman	2011	Malaysia Super League	22	0	0	0	0	0	–		0	0
Kedah Darul Aman	2012	Malaysia Super League	10	0	0	0	0	0	–		0	0
Kedah Darul Aman	2013	Malaysia Premier League	0	0	0	0	0	0	–		0	0
Kedah Darul Aman	2014	Malaysia Premier League	0	0	0	0	0	0	–		0	0
Kedah Darul Aman	2015	Malaysia Premier League	0	0	2	0	11	0	–		34	0
Kedah Darul Aman	2016	Malaysia Super League	17	0	4	1	9	0	–		30	1
Kedah Darul Aman	2017	Malaysia Super League	18	0	5	0	8	0	–		31	0
Kedah Darul Aman	2018	Malaysia Super League	17	0	2	0	4	0	–		23	0
Kedah Darul Aman	2019	Malaysia Super League	6	0	3	0	3	0	–		12	0
Kedah Darul Aman	2020	Malaysia Super League	1	0	0	0	0	0	0	0	1	0
Kedah Darul Aman	Total		0	0	0	0	0	0	0	0	0	0
Melaka United	2021	Malaysia Super League	8	0	–		1	0	–		9	0
Melaka United	Total		8	0	–		1	0	–		9	0
Kelantan	2022	Malaysia Premier League	13	0	1	0	4	0	–		18	0
Kelantan	2023	Malaysia Super League	0	0	0	0	0	0	–		0	0
Kelantan	Total		0	0	0	0	0	0	0	0	0	0
Career Total			0	0	0	0	0	0	0	0	0	0

=== International ===
As of 13 November 2017

Appearances and goals by national team and year
National team	Year	Apps	Goals
Malaysia	2016	1	0
Malaysia	2017	4	0
Total		5	0

== Honours ==
Club

Kedah Darul Aman

- Malaysia Super League (2): 2006-2007, 2007-2008
- Malaysia Cup (3): 2007, 2008, 2016
- FA Cup Malaysia (4): 2007, 2008, 2017, 2019
- Malaysia Premier League (2): 2005–06, 2015
- Malaysia Charity Shield (1): 2017

Kelantan

- Malaysia Premier League runner-up: 2022

International

Malaysia

- AFF Championship: 2010
