= Liridon Krasniqi =

Kosovar-Malaysian footballer (born 1992)

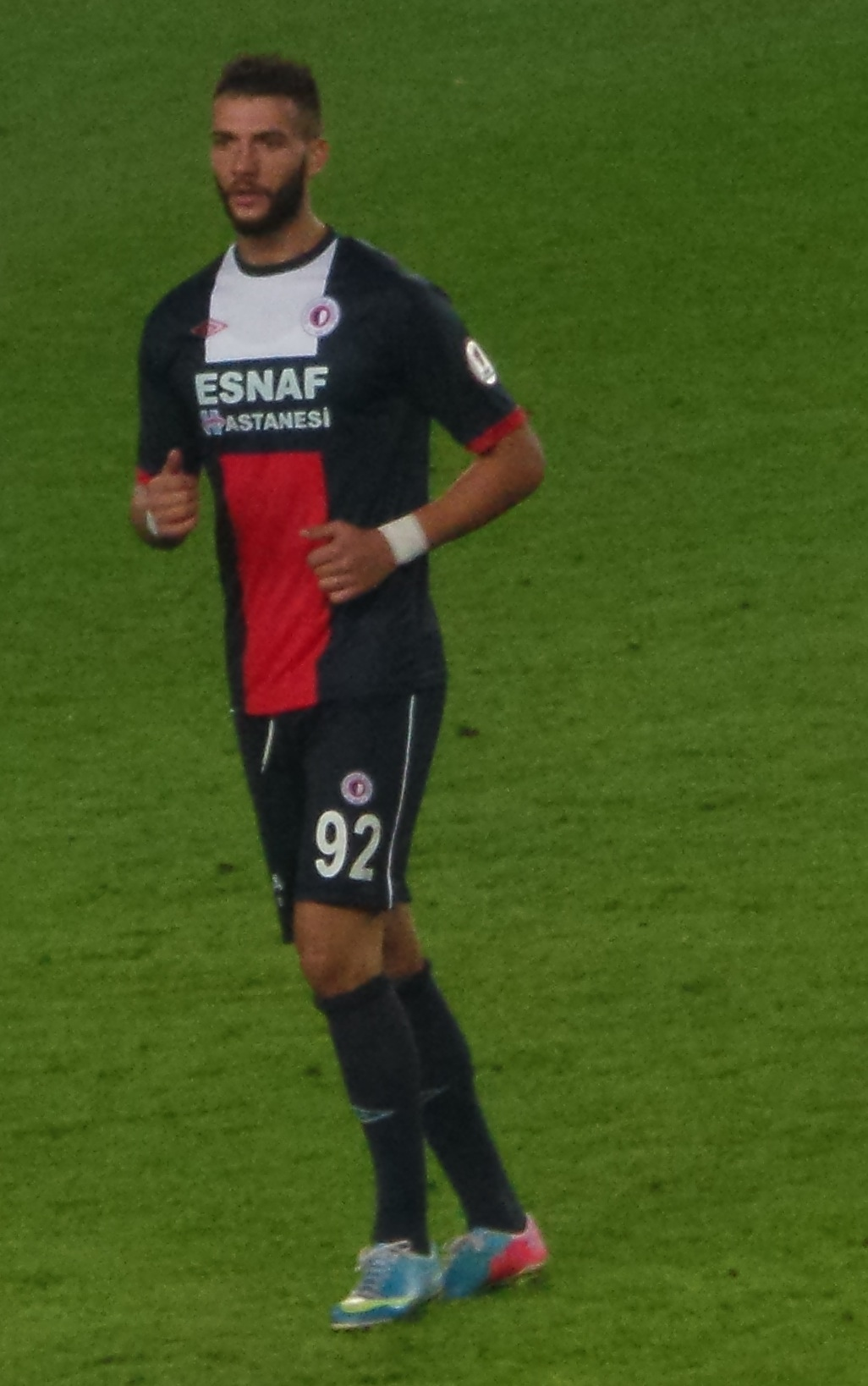
- Krasniqi with Fethiyespor in 2013

Personal information
- Date of birth: 1 January 1992 (age 34)
- Place of birth: Gërmova, SFR Yugoslavia
- Height: 1.92 m (6 ft 4 in)
- Position: Attacking midfielder

Team information
- Current team: Miami United
- Number: 35

Youth career
- –2009: 1. FC Nürnberg
- 2009–2011: Slavia Prague
- 2011–2012: Mladá Boleslav

Senior career*
Years	Team	Apps	(Gls)
2011–2012	Mladá Boleslav	1	(0)
2013–2015	Ankaraspor	0	(0)
2013–2014	→ Fethiyespor (loan)	33	(2)
2015–2019	Kedah	67	(19)
2019	Melaka United	6	(1)
2019–2023	Johor Darul Ta'zim	3	(0)
2021	→ Newcastle Jets (loan)	9	(0)
2021–2022	→ Odisha (loan)	16	(0)
2022	→ Khon Kaen United (loan)	6	(0)
2023	→ Terengganu (loan)	21	(1)
2025	FC Schaffhausen II	11	(1)
2025–	Miami United		

International career
2011	Albania U21	1	(0)
2014–2015	Kosovo	3	(0)
2021–2022	Malaysia	7	(1)
- * Club domestic league appearances and goals as of 8 September 2025

Liridon Krasniqi (born 1 January 1992) is a professional footballer who plays as an attacking midfielder for United Premier Soccer League club Miami United. Born in Kosovo, he has represented both the Kosovo and Malaysia national teams.

Krasniqi made his senior debut with Mladá Boleslav in 2011 before signing for Turkish club Ankaraspor two years later. He did not make any appearances for the team, and was loaned to the TFF First League side Fethiyespor for the 2013–14 season. In 2015, Krasniqi joined Malaysian side Kedah, winning the 2016 Malaysia Cup and 2017 Malaysia FA Cup during his four-year spell with the club. After a brief spell with Melaka United, he signed for defending Malaysia Super League champions Johor Darul Ta'zim ahead of the 2020 season.

Internationally, Krasniqi has represented Albania at the youth level and Kosovo at the senior level, appearing in the nation's first international match against Haiti in 2014. He switched his international allegiance to Malaysia in 2020 after staying in the country for five years, and made his Malaysia debut in 2021.

== Club career ==
=== Early career and Mladá Boleslav ===
Krasniqi was part of 1. FC Nürnberg's youth team until 2009, when he was transferred to the Czech side Slavia Prague. On 2 March 2011, Krasniqi signed a contract until the end of the season with the Czech First League club Mladá Boleslav. He played his first and only match on 14 May 2011 in a 2–1 home defeat against Jablonec after coming on as a substitute in the 69th minute in place of Ondřej Kúdela.

=== Ankaraspor and loan to Fethiyespor ===
On 29 July 2013, Krasniqi signed a three-year contract with the TFF First League club Ankaraspor. Two days later, he was loaned to fellow TFF First League club Fethiyespor. Eighteen days later, he made his debut in a 3–2 away defeat against 1461 Trabzon after being named in the starting line-up.

=== Kedah ===
On 9 April 2015, Krasniqi joined Malaysian Premier League side Kedah. Eight days later, he made his debut against Negeri Sembilan and scored his side's second goal during a 2–1 home win. With Kedah, Krasniqi won the 2016 Malaysia Cup and 2017 Malaysia FA Cup.

=== Melaka United ===
On 19 January 2019, Krasniqi joined Malaysian Super League side Melaka United. Fourteen days later, he made his debut against Petaling Jaya City after being named in the starting line-up and scored his side's first goal during a 2–1 home win.

=== Johor Darul Ta'zim ===
On 20 December 2019, Krasniqi joined Malaysian Super League side Johor Darul Ta'zim. On 28 February 2020, he made his debut in a 1–0 home win against his former club Kedah after coming on as a substitute in the 89th minute in place of Leandro Velázquez.

==== Loan to Newcastle Jets ====
On 5 February 2021, Krasniqi joined A-League side Newcastle Jets, on a season-long loan. On 13 March 2021, he made his debut in a 2–1 away defeat against Sydney FC after coming on as a substitute in the 85th minute in place of Angus Thurgate.

==== Loan to Odisha ====
On 23 August 2021, Krasniqi joined Indian Super League side Odisha, on a season-long loan. He made his league debut on 24 November in a 3–1 win against Bengaluru FC.

==== Loan to Khon Kaen United ====
In August 2022, Krasniqi moved to Thai League 1 side Khon Kaen United on a year-long loan. However, his loan ended early as Krasniqi returned to Johor in January 2023.

==== Loan to Terengganu ====
On 12 February 2023, Krasniqi officially joined fellow Super League side Terengganu on loan for the 2023 Malaysia Super League season.

== International career ==
=== Albania and Kosovo ===
Krasniqi was part of the Albanian under-21 team, making one appearance in a friendly match against Israel in March 2011. Three years later, he received a call-up from Kosovo for their first official international match against Haiti, and made his senior Kosovo debut after coming on as a substitute in the 71st minute in place of Ardian Gashi.

=== Malaysia ===
On 3 February 2020, the Football Association of Malaysia announced that Krasniqi had received Malaysian citizenship after staying in the country for almost five years, becoming eligible for the Malaysian national team. On 10 May 2021, he received a call-up from Malaysia for the friendly match against Bahrain and the 2022 FIFA World Cup qualification matches against the United Arab Emirates, Vietnam and Thailand. Eighteen days later, Krasniqi made his debut in a friendly match against Bahrain after being named in the starting line-up.

== Career statistics ==
=== Club ===
As of 17 December 2023

Appearances and goals by club, season and competition
Club	Season	League			National cup (Note: Includes Turkish Cup, Malaysia FA Cup, Thai FA Cup)		League cup (Note: Includes Malaysia Cup, Thai League Cup)		Other		Total	
Club	Season	Division	Apps	Goals	Apps	Goals	Apps	Goals	Apps	Goals	Apps	Goals
Mladá Boleslav	2010–11	Czech First League	1	0	—		—		—		1	0
Fethiyespor (loan)	2013–14	TFF First League	33	2	4	1	—		—		37	3
Kedah	2015	Malaysia Premier League	15	5	0	0	11	1	—		26	6
Kedah	2016	Malaysia Super League	20	5	5	0	11	5	—		36	10
Kedah	2017	Malaysia Super League	18	2	6	3	10	3	1 (Note: Appearances in Malaysia Charity Shield)	0	35	8
Kedah	2018	Malaysia Super League	14	7	2	0	4	3	—		20	10
Kedah	Total		67	19	13	3	36	12	1	0	117	34
Melaka United	2019	Malaysia Super League	6	1	0	0	0	0	—		6	1
Johor Darul Ta'zim	2020	Malaysia Super League	3	0	0	0	0	0	1	0	4	0
Newcastle Jets (loan)	2020–21	A-League	9	0	0	0	—		—		9	0
Odisha (loan)	2021–22	Indian Super League	16	0	—		—		—		16	0
Khon Kaen United (loan)	2022–23	Thai League 1	6	0	1	0	1	0	—		8	0
Terengganu (loan)	2023	Malaysia Super League	21	1	2	0	4	1	3 (Note: Appearances in AFC Cup)	0	30	2
Career total			162	23	20	4	41	13	5	0	228	40

=== International ===
Appearances and goals by national team and year
National team	Year	Apps	Goals
Kosovo
Kosovo	2014	2	0
Kosovo	2015	1	0
Total		3	0
Malaysia
Malaysia	2021	4	0
Malaysia	2022	3	1
Total		7	1

Scores and results list Malaysia's goal tally first, score column indicates score after each Krasniqi goal.

List of international goals scored by Liridon Krasniqi
No.	Date	Venue	Opponent	Score	Result	Competition
1	26 March 2022	National Stadium, Kallang, Singapore	Singapore	1–1	1–2	2022 FAS Tri-Nations Series

== Honours ==
Mladá Boleslav

- Czech Cup: 2010–11

Kedah FA

- Malaysia Premier League: 2015
- Malaysia FA Cup: 2017
- Malaysia Cup: 2016
- Malaysia Charity Shield: 2017

Johor Darul Ta'zim

- Malaysia Super League: 2020
- Malaysia Charity Shield: 2020

Terengganu

- Malaysia Cup runner-up: 2023
