= Farhan Abu Bakar =

Malaysian footballer

Personal information
- Full name: Mohd Farhan Bin Abu Bakar
- Date of birth: 14 February 1993 (age 33)
- Place of birth: Alor Setar, Kedah, Malaysia
- Height: 1.81 m (5 ft 11 1/2 in)
- Position: Goalkeeper

Team information
- Current team: Immigration
- Number: 13

Youth career
- 2008: Bukit Jalil Sports School

Senior career*
Years	Team	Apps	(Gls)
2009–2011	Harimau Muda B	14	(0)
2012–2015	Harimau Muda A	24	(0)
2016–2021	Kedah Darul Aman	21	(0)
2018	→ Petaling Jaya Rangers (loan)	9	(0)
2019	→ Selangor II (loan)		
2022	Kuala Lumpur Rovers		
2023–2025	Kelantan		
2025–	Immigration		

International career
2015–	Malaysia	1	(0)
- * Club domestic league appearances and goals

Mohd Farhan Bin Abu Bakar (born 14 February 1993) is a Malaysian professional footballer who plays as a goalkeeper for Malaysia Super League club Immigration.

== International career ==
Farhan has represented Malaysia in the 2013 Summer Universiade as a second choice goalkeeper after Izham Tarmizi. In the opening game against Italy, Farhan came off the bench in the 72nd minute and saved two penalties. Malaysia won the game by 2–0. Farhan played for Harimau Muda B in 2015 under head coach Razip Ismail. Farhan earned his first senior national cap in a friendly match against Papua New Guinea on 17 June 2016, which Malaysia lost 0–2.

== Career statistics ==
=== Club ===
As of 31 August 2018

Season	Club	League	Apps	Goals	Apps	Goals	Apps	Goals	Apps	Goals	Apps	Goals
Malaysia			League		FA Cup		Malaysia Cup		Asia		Total	
2011	Harimau Muda B	Malaysia Premier League	14	0	0	0	–				14	0
Total			14	0	0	0	–				14	0
Singapore			League		Cup		League Cup		Asia		Total	
Season	Club	League	Apps	Goals	Apps	Goals	Apps	Goals	Apps	Goals	Apps	Goals
2012	Harimau Muda	S.League	5	0	–						5	0
2015	Harimau Muda	S.League	10	0	–						21	0
Total			15	0	–						15	0
Malaysia			League		FA Cup		Malaysia Cup		Asia		Total	
Season	Club	League	Apps	Goals	Apps	Goals	Apps	Goals	Apps	Goals	Apps	Goals
2016	Kedah	Malaysia Super League	14	0	6	0	1	0	–		21	0
2017	Kedah	Malaysia Super League	7	0	0	0	3	0	–		10	0
Total			21	0	6	0	4	0	0	0	31	0
2018	Petaling Jaya Rangers	Malaysia FAM League	9	0	2	0	0	0	–		11	0

Note

For 2013 season Farhan undergoes Centralized Training Camp in Slovakia and for 2014 he played at National Premier Leagues Queensland representing Harimau Muda A

=== International ===
As of 17 June 2016

National team	Year	Apps	Goals
Malaysia	2016	1	0
Total		1	0

== Honours ==
=== Club ===
Kedah FA

- Malaysia FA Cup: 2017
- Malaysia Cup: 2016
- Charity Shield: 2017
