= Nidzam Adzha =

Malaysian footballer and coach

Muhammad Nidzam Adzha
Personal information
- Full name: Muhammad Nidzam Adzha Yusoff
- Date of birth: 11 March 1968 (age 58)
- Place of birth: Taiping, Perak, Malaysia
- Height: 1.76 m (5 ft 9 1/2 in)
- Positions: Attacking midfielder; striker

Youth career
- 1988: Perak FA

Senior career*
Years	Team	Apps	(Gls)
1989–1992	Perak FA	67	(20)
1993–1998	Kedah FA	51	(11)
1999	Kelantan FA	14	(3)
2000	Kedah FA	11	(2)

International career
1991–1995	Malaysia	24	(3)

Managerial career
- 2009: Kuala Muda NAZA FC
- 2010: Perlis FA
- 2011: Sime Darby FC (Youth Coach)
- 2012: Kedah FA (Youth Coach)
- 2012: Kedah FA (Caretaker)
- 2013: Felda United F.C. (assistant)
- 2014: Felda United F.C. (Youth Coach)
- 2015–2017: Kedah FA (assistant)
- 2017–2018: Kedah FA
- 2019: Melaka United (assistant)
- 2020: Kuala Lumpur (Coach)
- 2021: Kuala Lumpur (assistant)
- * Club domestic league appearances and goals

Muhammad Nidzam Adzha Yusoff (born 11 March 1968) is a Malaysian football coach and former footballer. He is the current assistant head coach of Malaysia Super League side Kuala Lumpur FC

== Playing career ==
He formerly played for Kedah FA, as well as Perak FA in Malaysian League (M-League).

He also played for the national team and made his debut in the 1991 Merdeka Tournament. He was dropped from the national team after the World Cup qualifier in 1991. It took him three years to return to the national team but he was again dropped because of injury.

He once made controversy when he left Perak to join Kedah in the 1993 season. In his first season with Kedah, he helped the team win two trophies. In 1995, he was arrested on suspicion of match-fixing but the charges were later dropped.

== Career as coach ==
Nidzam was formerly with Perlis FA as a coach in 2010. He also was an assistant coach with Kuala Muda Naza FC, later becoming head coach with them in 2009. Earlier, he was also an assistant coach with now defunct club, Kelantan TNB.

In 2012 he coaches Kedah FA President's Cup U-23 squad, and also the caretaker head coach for Kedah senior squad for the first 7 games of 2012 Super League Malaysia as head coach Wan Jamak Wan Hassan is suspended by Football Association of Malaysia for the same duration for criticising refereeing decisions in a 2011 Malaysia Cup match involving Kedah. On 23 May 2017 Mohd Nidzam was officially appointed as the head coach for Kedah by the Kedah Football Association (KFA) as a replacement for former coach Tan Cheng Hoe who has since joined the Malaysia national football team as assistant coach. He were released from his position to make way for new head coach Ramon Marcote before the start of the 2018 season, however he were reappointed by Kedah as head coach on March the same year, replacing Marcote.

== Managerial statistics ==
As of match played 31 October 2020

Team	From	To	Record				
Team	From	To	G	W	D	L	Win%
Kedah	30 April 2017	5 November 2017	25	16	4	5	64.00
Kedah	13 April 2018	11 August 2018	19	7	6	6	36.84
Kuala Lumpur	2020	2020	11	6	3	2	54.55
Total			55	29	13	13	52.73

== Honours ==
=== Club ===
Kedah FA

- Malaysia FA Cup: 2017
- Malaysia Cup runner-up: 2017
