= Hanif Dzahir =

Malaysian footballer

Personal information
- Full name: Muhammad Hanif bin Mat Dzahir
- Date of birth: 15 January 1994 (age 32)
- Place of birth: Kedah, Malaysia
- Height: 1.74 m (5 ft 8 1/2 in)
- Position: Central midfielder

Youth career
- 2011: Bukit Jalil Sports School
- 2012–2013: Harimau Muda B
- 2014: Kedah U-21

Senior career*
Years	Team	Apps	(Gls)
2012–2013	Harimau Muda B	16	(1)
2015–2018	Kedah	28	(0)
- * Club domestic league appearances and goals as of July 18, 2017

Muhammad Hanif bin Mat Dzahir (born 15 January 1994) is a Malaysian professional footballer who plays as central midfielder.

== Career statistics ==
=== Club ===
As of 27 June 2018

Club	Season	League		Cup		League Cup		Continental		Total	
Club	Season	Apps	Goals	Apps	Goals	Apps	Goals	Apps	Goals	Apps	Goals
Kedah	2015	0	0	0	0	0	0	–	–	0	0
Kedah	2016	7	0	0	0	2	0	–	–	9	0
Kedah	2017	9	0	1	0	2	0	–	–	12	0
Kedah	2018	12	0	0	0	1	0	–	–	13	0
Kedah	Total	28	0	1	0	5	0	0	0	34	0
Career total		0	0	0	0	0	0	0	0	0	0
