= 2017 Piala Sumbangsih =

Johor Darul Ta'zim	Kedah
1	1
- Kedah won 5–4 on penalties
- Date: 20 January 2017
- Venue: Larkin Stadium, Johor Bahru
- Man of the Match: Baddrol Bakhtiar (Kedah)
- Referee: Suhaimi Mat Hassan
- Attendance: 24,157

The 2017 Piala Sumbangsih was the 32nd edition of the Piala Sumbangsih, an annual football match played between the winners of the previous season's Malaysia Super League and Malaysia Cup. The game was played between the Kedah FA, winners of the 2016 Malaysia Cup, and Johor Darul Ta'zim F.C., champions of the 2016 Malaysia Super League.

== Match details ==
20 January 2017
21:00 UTC+8

Johor Darul Ta'zim	1–1	Kedah
Safiq Rahim 41' (pen.)	Report	Badrol Bakhtiar 63'
Penalties
Jerónimo Barrales (penalty scored); Marcos António (penalty scored); Gonzalo Cabrera (penalty scored); Brian Ferreira (penalty missed); Safiq Rahim (penalty scored)	4–5	(penalty scored) Farhan Roslan; (penalty scored) Akram Mahinan; (penalty scored) Ken Ilsø; (penalty scored) Baddrol Bakhtiar; (penalty scored) Liridon Krasniqi

Larkin Stadium, Johor Bahru, Johor
Attendance: 24,157
Referee: Suhaimi Mat Hassan

GK	1	Mohd Farizal Marlias
DF	7	Aidil Zafuan		(substituted off) 52'
DF	6	Marcos Antonio	(yellow card) 65'
DF	15	Muhammad Fazly Mazlan
MF	5	Amirul Hadi Zainal
MF	8	Safiq Rahim	(yellow card) 68'
MF	12	S. Kunanlan	(red card) 45+3'
FW	11	Gonzalo Cabrera
MF	2	Azamuddin Akil		(substituted off) 46'
FW	10	Brian Ferreira	(yellow card) 26'
FW	9	Hazwan Bakri		(substituted off) 43'
Substitutes:
FW	19	Jeronimo Barrales		(substituted in) 43'
DF	20	Azrif Nasrulhaq		(substituted in) 46'
DF	27	Fadhli Shas		(substituted in) 52'
DF	18	Mahali Jasuli
MF	16	Mohd Shakir Shaari
FW	29	Safawi Rasid
GK	30	Haziq Nadzli
Coach:
Benjamin Mora

GK	1	Abdul Hadi Abdul Hamid
DF	4	Zac Anderson
DF	2	Syawal Nordin		(substituted off) 73'
DF	24	Asri Mardzuki	(yellow card) 10'	(substituted off) 64'
MF	10	Sandro da Silva Mendonca	(yellow card) 45+3'	(substituted off) 65'
MF	7	Baddrol Bakhtiar
MF	12	Muhammad Akram Mahinan	(yellow card) 80'
MF	8	Liridon Krasniqi
FW	9	Ken Ilsø
FW	14	Ahmad Fakri Saarani
DF	15	Rizal Ghazali
Substitutes:
DF	3	Mohd Fitri Omar		(substituted in) 64'
MF	19	Muhammad Farhan Roslan		(substituted in) 65'
DF	13	Khairul Helmi Johari		(substituted in) 73'
MF	16	Amirul Hisyam Awang Kechik
GK	21	Mohd Farhan Abu Bakar
MF	23	Hanif Dzahir
DF	5	Osman Yusoff
Coach:
Tan Cheng Hoe

Match officials

- Referee:
  - Suhaimi Mat Hassan
- Assistant referees:
  - Mohd Mu'azi Zainal Abidin
  - Zairul Khalil Tan
- Fourth official:
  - Mohd Zohri Tajuddin

== Winners ==
2017 Piala Sumbangsih

Kedah
Third title
