= Piala Sumbangsih =

Association football tournament in Malaysia

Malaysian Charity Shield
- Founded: 1985; 41 years ago
- Region: Malaysia
- Teams: 2
- Current champions: Johor Darul Ta'zim (11th title)
- Most championships: Johor Darul Ta'zim (11 titles)
- Website: malaysianfootballleague.com
- 2026 Piala Sumbangsih

The Malaysian Charity Shield (English: Charity Cup), also known as Piala Sultan Haji Ahmad Shah (English: Sultan Haji Ahmad Shah Cup) or Piala Sumbangsih, is a Malaysian football super cup competition. It is the curtain raiser match to the new Malaysian football season, pitting the reigning Malaysia Super League champions against the previous year's winners of the Malaysia Cup.

Johor Darul Ta'zim are the current title holders after winning their eleventh title in 2026.

== History ==
The Malaysian Charity Shield was first held in 1985, contested between Selangor and Pahang, with Selangor becoming the first winner after winning the match 2–1. The cup format has changed when during early days it was contested by the previous year winners of the Malaysia FA Cup against the Malaysia Cup winners, and only in recent years it has changed to be contested between the last year league winners against the Malaysia Cup winners.

The match act as the curtain raiser match to the new Malaysian football season, pitting the reigning Malaysia Super League champions against the previous year's winners of the Malaysia Cup. If the Malaysia Super League champions also won the Malaysia Cup, then the league runners-up provide the opposition. Since 2016, the Piala Sumbangsih match is also considered the first match of the league season, where the league points are awarded.

== Winners ==
Year	Winners	Runners-up	Score	Venue
1985	Selangor	Pahang	2–1	Stadium Merdeka
1986	Johor	Singapore	1–1 (6–5 pen.)	Stadium Merdeka
1987	Selangor	Kuala Lumpur	1–0	Stadium Merdeka
1988	Kuala Lumpur	Pahang	2–1	Darul Makmur Stadium
1989	Singapore	Kuala Lumpur	1–0	KLFA Stadium
1990	Selangor	Kuala Lumpur	0–0 (3–0 pen.)	Stadium Merdeka
1991	Kedah	Selangor	2–1	Darul Aman Stadium
1992	Pahang	Johor	2–0	Larkin Stadium
1993	Pahang	Sarawak	5–0	Darul Makmur Stadium
1994	Kedah	Kuala Lumpur	1–0	Darul Aman Stadium
1995	Kuala Lumpur	Pahang	3–2	Stadium Merdeka
1996	Selangor	Sabah	2–0	Likas Stadium
1997	Selangor	Kedah	2–0	Shah Alam Stadium
1998	Sarawak	Selangor	3–1	Negeri Stadium
1999	Perak	Johor	2–0	Perak Stadium
2000	Kuala Lumpur	Brunei	1–1 (4–3 pen.)	KLFA Stadium
2001	Terengganu	Perak	4–0	Sultan Ismail Nasiruddin Shah Stadium
2002	Selangor	Terengganu	2–1	Sultan Ismail Nasiruddin Shah Stadium
2003	Pulau Pinang	Selangor	1–0	Batu Kawan Stadium
2004	MPPJ FC	Negeri Sembilan	4–2	MPPJ Stadium
2005	Perak	Perlis	2–2 (4–2 pen.)	Utama Stadium
2006	Perak	Selangor	4–2	Bukit Jalil National Stadium
2007	Perlis	Pahang	2–1	Utama Stadium
2008	Perlis	Kedah	0–0 (6–5 pen.)	Darul Aman Stadium
2009	Selangor	Kedah	4–1	Darul Aman Stadium
2010	Selangor	Negeri Sembilan	2–1	Tuanku Abdul Rahman Stadium
2011	Kelantan	Selangor	2–0	Shah Alam Stadium
2012	Negeri Sembilan	Kelantan	2–1	Bukit Jalil National Stadium
2013	ATM	Kelantan	1–1 (4–3 pen.)	Shah Alam Stadium
2014	Pahang	LionsXII	1–0	Darul Makmur Stadium
2015	Johor Darul Ta'zim	Pahang	2–0	Larkin Stadium
2016	Johor Darul Ta'zim	Selangor	1–1 (7–6 pen.)	Larkin Stadium
2017	Kedah	Johor Darul Ta'zim	1–1 (5–4 pen.)	Larkin Stadium
2018	Johor Darul Ta'zim	Kedah	2–1	Larkin Stadium
2019	Johor Darul Ta'zim	Perak	1–0	Larkin Stadium
2020	Johor Darul Ta'zim	Kedah	1–0	Sultan Ibrahim Stadium
2021	Johor Darul Ta'zim	Kedah Darul Aman	2–0	Sultan Ibrahim Stadium
2022	Johor Darul Ta'zim	Kuala Lumpur City	3–0	Sultan Ibrahim Stadium
2023	Johor Darul Ta'zim	Terengganu	2–0	Sultan Ibrahim Stadium
2024	Johor Darul Ta'zim	Selangor	3–0 (w/o) (Note: Cancelled after Selangor withdrew due to security reasons, and the trophy was awarded to Johor Darul Ta'zim.)	Sultan Ibrahim Stadium
2025	Johor Darul Ta'zim	Selangor	3–0	Sultan Ibrahim Stadium
2026	Johor Darul Ta'zim	Kuching City	3–0	Sultan Ibrahim Stadium

== Performance by clubs ==
Since its establishment, this tournament has been won by 16 teams. Teams shown in italics no longer exist or no longer compete in the competition.

Rank	Team	Winners	Runners-up
1	Johor Darul Ta'zim	11	1
2	Selangor	8	8
3	Kedah Darul Aman	3	6
4	Sri Pahang	3	5
4	Kuala Lumpur City	3	5
6	Perak	3	2
7	Perlis	2	1
8	Johor FA	1	2
8	Negeri Sembilan	1	2
8	Kelantan	1	2
8	Terengganu	1	2
12	Sarawak	1	1
12	Singapore	1	1
14	Pulau Pinang	1	0
14	MPPJ	1	0
14	ATM	1	0
17	Sabah	0	1
17	Brunei	0	1
17	LionsXII	0	1
17	Kuching City	0	1

== See also ==
- MFL Challenge Cup
- MFL Cup
- Piala Emas Raja-Raja
- Football in Malaysia
