= 2016 Kedah FA season =

Kedah
2016 season
- President: Dato' Paduka Mukhriz Mahathir (until 3 February 2016); Dato' Seri Ahmad Bashah Md Hanipah (from 3 February 2016)
- Manager: Dato' Jeffrey Low Han Chow
- Head Coach: Tan Cheng Hoe
- Stadium: Darul Aman Stadium; Alor Setar, Kedah, Malaysia
- Super League: 3rd
- FA Cup: Semi-finals
- Malaysia Cup: Winners
- Top goalscorer: League: Smeltz (6); All: Smeltz (11)
- Highest home attendance: 25,000 (vs Negeri Sembilan, 17 September 2016) (vs PDRM, 30 September 2016)
- Lowest home attendance: 3,300 vs Felda United, 21 October 2016
- Average home league attendance: 9,402
- Biggest win: 8 – 0 vs Megah Murni (H), 19 February 2016
- Biggest defeat: 5 – 0 vs Johor Darul Ta'zim (A), 16 July 2016
Home colours	Away colours	Third colours
- All statistics correct as of 30 October 2016.

The 2016 season was Kedah FA's 8th season in the Malaysia Super League since its inception in 2004. They will also eligible to compete in FA Cup and Malaysia Cup.

== Kit ==
Supplier: Warrix / Sponsor: Discover Kedah 2016, Syarikat Air Darul Aman (SADA), Perbadanan Kemajuan Negeri Kedah (Kedah State Development Corporation)

Home	Away	Third	Goalkeeper 1	Goalkeeper 2	Goalkeeper 3

== Players ==
=== Squad information ===
N	P	Nat.	POB	Name	Date of birth	Age	Since	Ends	Notes
1	GK	(Malaysia)	(Kedah)	Abdul Hadi Abdul Hamid	25 February 1987 (age 38)	29	2006		
2	DF	(Malaysia)	(Perak)	Mohamad Sabre Mat Abu	8 August 1987 (age 38)	29	2015	2016	
3	DF	(Malaysia)	(Kedah)	Mohamad Syawal Nordin	25 March 1993 (age 32)	23	2016		
4	DF	(South Korea)		Bang Seung-Hwan	25 February 1983 (age 42)	33	2015	2016	
5	DF	(Malaysia)	(Kedah)	Osman Mohd Yusof	17 May 1994 (age 31)	22	2016		
6	DF	(Malaysia)	(Kedah)	Shafizan Hashim	2 September 1982 (age 43)	34	2014	2016	
7	MF	(Malaysia)	(Kedah)	Baddrol Bakhtiar (VC)	1 February 1988 (age 38)	28	2006		
8	MF	(Kosovo)		Liridon Krasniqi	1 January 1992 (age 34)	24	2015	2018	
—	FW	(Brazil)	(São Paulo (state))	Carlos "Kahe" Eduardo de Souza Floresta	28 August 1982 (age 43)	34	2016	2016	
9	FW	(Brazil)	(Santa Catarina (state))	Thiago Augusto Fernandes	25 May 1990 (age 35)	26	2016	2016	
10	MF	(Brazil)	(Fortaleza)	Sandro da Silva Mendonça	1 October 1983 (age 42)	33	2015	2017	
11	DF	(Malaysia)	(Kedah)	Mohamad Raphi Azizan Mariappen	28 January 1996 (age 30)	20	2015		
12	MF	(Malaysia)	(Kedah)	Amar Rohidan	23 April 1987 (age 38)	29	2016	2016	
13	DF	(Malaysia)	(Kedah)	Khairul Helmi Johari (C)	31 March 1988 (age 37)	28	2006		
—	FW	(Malaysia)	(Kelantan)	Ahmad Fakri Saarani	8 July 1989 (age 36)	27	2016	2016	
14	FW	(New Zealand)	(Germany)	Shane Edward Smeltz	29 September 1981 (age 44)	35	2016	2016	
15	DF	(Malaysia)	(Kedah)	Mohamad Rizal Ghazali	1 October 1992 (age 33)	24	2014		
16	MF	(Malaysia)	(Kedah)	Mohamad Amirul Hisyam Awang Kechik	5 May 1995 (age 30)	21	2016		
17	MF	(Malaysia)	(Kedah)	Mohd Syazwan Tajuddin	7 January 1994 (age 32)	22	2014		
18	MF	(Malaysia)	(Kedah)	Abdul Halim Saari	14 November 1994 (age 31)	21	2016		
19	MF	(Malaysia)	(Kedah)	Muhammad Farhan Roslan	3 December 1996 (age 29)	19	2014	2017	
20	FW	(Malaysia)	(Penang)	Muhammad Syafiq Ahmad	28 June 1995 (age 30)	21	2013		
21	GK	(Malaysia)	(Kedah)	Mohamad Syazwan Abdullah	2 April 1996 (age 29)	20		2016	
22	MF	(Malaysia)	(Perlis)	Mohamad Syazwan Zainon	13 November 1989 (age 36)	26	2014		
23	MF	(Malaysia)	(Kedah)	Mohamad Hanif Mat Dzahir	15 January 1994 (age 32)	22	2014		
24	DF	(Malaysia)	(Terengganu)	Mohamad Alif Fadhil Ismail	11 May 1992 (age 33)	24	2015	2016	
25	DF	(Malaysia)	(Perak)	Azmeer Yusof	25 May 1990 (age 35)	26	2016	2016	
26	MF	(Malaysia)	(Selangor)	Mohamad Shazuan Ashraf Matthews	12 May 1992 (age 33)	24	2015	2016	
27	DF	(Malaysia)	(Kedah)	Muhammad Ariff Farhan Md Isa	14 July 1996 (age 29)	20	2016		
28	DF	(Malaysia)	(Kedah)	Mohamad Asri Mardzuki	12 May 1994 (age 31)	22	2016		
29	MF	(Malaysia)	(Kedah)	Syazuan Hazani	27 June 1994 (age 31)	22	2016		
30	GK	(Malaysia)	(Kedah)	Mohamad Farhan Abu Bakar	14 February 1993 (age 32)	23	2016		
31	GK	(Malaysia)	(Kedah)	Mohd Ifwat Akmal Che Kassim	10 August 1996 (age 29)	20	2016		

As of 27 November 2016
Source: Facebook Kedah FA
Ordered by squad number.

=== In ===
N	P	Nat.	Name	Age	Moving from	Type	Transfer window	Ends	Transfer fee
—	FW	(Brazil)	Kahê	33	(Brazil) Oeste Futebol Clube	Transfer	Pre-season	Aug 2016	Undisclosed
25	DF	(Malaysia)	Azmeer Yusof	25	ATM FA	Transfer	Pre-season		
27	DF	(Malaysia)	Ariff Farhan Isa	19	Harimau Muda	Transfer	Pre-season		
16	MF	(Malaysia)	Amirul Hisyam Awang Kechik	20	Harimau Muda	Transfer	Pre-season		
28	DF	(Malaysia)	Mohd Asri Mardzuki	21	Harimau Muda	Transfer	Pre-season		
30	GK	(Malaysia)	Mohd Farhan Abu Bakar	22	Harimau Muda	Transfer	Pre-season		
—	MF	(Malaysia)	Mohd Ridzuan Abdunloh	21	Harimau Muda	Transfer	Pre-season		
3	DF	(Malaysia)	Mohd Syawal Nordin	22	Harimau Muda	Transfer	Pre-season		
—	FW	(Malaysia)	Ahmad Fakri Saarani	26	Kelantan FA	Transfer	Pre-season	Oct 2016	
12	MF	(Malaysia)	Amar Rohidan	28	Kelantan FA	Transfer	Pre-season	Oct 2016	
18	MF	(Malaysia)	Abdul Halim Saari	21	Kedah FA U21	Promotion	Pre-season		
5	DF	(Malaysia)	Osman Mohd Yusoff	21	Kedah FA U21	Promotion	Pre-season		
29	MF	(Malaysia)	Syazuan Hazani	21	Kedah FA U21	Promotion	Pre-season		
14	FW	(New Zealand)	Shane Smeltz	34	(Australia) Sydney FC	Transfer	Mid-season	Oct 2016	
9	FW	(Brazil)	Thiago Augusto Fernandes	26	Felda United F.C.	Loan	Mid-season	Oct 2016	

=== Out ===
N	P	Nat.	Name	Age	Moving to	Type	Transfer window	Transfer fee
—	MF	(Malaysia)	Mohd Ridzuan Abdunloh	21	Felda United F.C.	Loan	Pre-season	
—	MF	(Malaysia)	Solehin Kanasian Abdullah	32	MOF F.C.		Pre-season	
25	GK	(Malaysia)	Mohd Firdaus Muhamad	21	Penang FA	End of loan	Pre-season	
8	FW	(Malaysia)	Ahmad Shakir Mohd Ali	26	PKNS FC		Pre-season	
16	DF	(Malaysia)	P. Rajesh	30	PKNS FC		Pre-season	
10	FW	(Nigeria)	Chidi Edeh	28	(Nigeria) Enugu Rangers	End of contract	Pre-season	
3	DF	(Malaysia)	Lew Han Hung				Pre-season	
24	DF	(Malaysia)	Muhd Fiqkry Mat Isa				Pre-season	
14	FW	(Malaysia)	Ahmad Fakri Saarani	27	Felda United F.C.	Loan	Mid-season	

== Technical staff ==
Position	Staff
Head coach	(Malaysia) Tan Cheng Hoe
Assistant coach	(Malaysia) Muhammad Nidzam Adzha
Fitness coach	(Brazil) Stefano Impagliazzo (Brazil) Rodrigo Pellegrino
Goalkeeping coach	(Malaysia) Faozi Mukhlas
Physiotherapist	(Malaysia) Muhammad Nur'illya Samsudin
Medical officer	(Malaysia) Mohd Syahrizal Nadzer
Kitman	(Malaysia) Abdul Razak Md Desa (Malaysia) Mohd Nasir Othman

Last updated: 10 May 2016
Source: Kedah FA Technical Staff

== Friendly matches ==
=== Pre-season ===
Win Draw Loss Postponed

13 January 2016 Friendly	Kedah FA	2 – 1	(Kuala Lumpur) Felcra F.C.	Sintok, Kedah, Malaysia
20:45 UTC+08:00	Shazuan Ashraf Mathews 72'; Shafizan Hashim 88' (pen.)		Mohd Faiz 47'	Stadium: Universiti Utara Malaysia; Referee: Shahril Abu Seman; Assistant referees: Danabalasingam; Zulkifli Ahmad; Fourth official: Nasshafit Zulkiflee

17 January 2016 Friendly	Kedah FA	3 – 1	Kuala Lumpur FA	Sintok, Kedah, Malaysia
20:45 UTC+08:00	Syafiq Ahmad 10', 35'; Fakri Saarani 75'		15'	Stadium: Universiti Utara Malaysia

23 January 2016 Friendly	Phuket FC (Thailand)	1 – 1	Kedah FA	Phuket, Thailand
19:00 UTC+07:00	58'		Syafiq Ahmad 50'	Stadium: Surakul Stadium

25 January 2016 Friendly	Krabi FC (Thailand)	3 – 2	Kedah FA	Krabi, Thailand
17:00 UTC+07:00	16'; 48' (pen.); 70'		Sandro 84'; Shazuan Ashraf Mathews 87'	Stadium: Krabi Provincial Stadium

27 January 2016 Friendly	Songkhla United F.C. (Thailand)	4 – 3	Kedah FA	Songkhla, Thailand
17:00 UTC+07:00	5'; 20'; 22'; 32' (pen.)		Farhan Roslan 9'; Syazwan Zainon 28'; Shazuan Ashraf Mathews 60'	Stadium: Tinasulanon Stadium

1 February 2016 Friendly	Kedah FA	6 – 0	(Penang) Sungai Ara F.C.	Alor Setar, Kedah, Malaysia
20:45 UTC+08:00	Kahê 26'; Fakri Saarani 37', 51', 56'; Bang 44'; Farhan Roslan 81'			Stadium: Darul Aman Stadium

6 February 2016 Friendly	Kedah A	3 – 2	Kedah B	Sintok, Kedah, Malaysia
20:45 UTC+08:00	Sandro 36'; Liridon Krasniqi 60'; Kahê 75'		Abdul Halim Saari 10'; Shazuan Ashraf Mathews 85' (pen.)	Stadium: Universiti Utara Malaysia

=== Current season ===
25 March 2016 Friendly	Perlis FA	1 – 1	Kedah FA	Kangar, Perlis, Malaysia
21:00 UTC+08:00	Kayne Vincent 58'		Halim Saari 27'	Stadium: Tuanku Syed Putra Stadium; Referee: Muhammad Shahrul Amin; Assistant referees: Muhd Azale Nidzar; Mohd Fazli Ishak; Fourth official: Shaharudin Man

25 April 2016 Friendly	Kedah FA	2 – 1	Kedah U21	Alor Setar, Kedah, Malaysia
17:30 UTC+08:00	Syafiq Ahmad; Fakri Saarani		Mazlan Mohamad	Stadium: Darul Aman Stadium

15 June 2016 Friendly	Kedah FA	2 – 0	(Kuala Lumpur) MISC-MIFA	Alor Setar, Kedah, Malaysia
22:00 UTC+08:00	Bang Seung-hwan 16' (substituted off) 46'; Bruno Lopes 27' (pen.) (substituted off) 60'; Khairul Helmi Johari (substituted off) 46'; Rizal Ghazali (substituted off) 46'; Shafizan Hashim (substituted on) 46'; Syawal Nordin (substituted on) 46'; Osman Yusof (substituted on) 46'; Shazuan Ashraf Mathews (substituted off) 60'; Syazuan Hazani (substituted on) 60'; Azmeer Yusof (substituted on) 60'			Stadium: Darul Aman Stadium; Attendance: 5,000

22 June 2016 Friendly	Kedah FA	3 – 2	Perlis FA	Alor Setar, Kedah, Malaysia
22:00 UTC+08:00	Bruno Lopes 50', 77' (pen.), 89'		35'; 48'	Stadium: Darul Aman Stadium; Attendance: 5,000

25 June 2016 Friendly	Kedah FA	1 – 1	Penang FA	Alor Setar, Kedah, Malaysia
22:00 UTC+08:00	Liridon Krasniqi 66'		Mafry Balang 46'	Stadium: Darul Aman Stadium

29 June 2016 Friendly	Kedah FA	1 – 1	(Perak) DRB-Hicom F.C.	Alor Setar, Kedah, Malaysia
22:00 UTC+08:00	Syazwan Zainon 74' (pen.)		Cendix 32'	Stadium: Darul Aman Stadium; Attendance: 1,000

3 July 2016 Friendly	PKNS F.C. (Selangor)	2 – 5	Kedah FA	Petaling Jaya, Selangor, Malaysia
22:00 UTC+08:00	34'; 40'		Baptiste Faye 32'; Farhan Roslan 44', 79'; Rizal Ghazali 73'; Shazuan Ashraf Mathews 78'	Stadium: MBPJ Stadium

5 September 2016 Friendly	Songkhla United F.C. (Thailand)	0 – 1	Kedah FA	Na Thawi, Songkhla, Thailand
16:00 UTC+07:00			Farhan Roslan	Stadium: Na Thawi District Stadium

20 September 2016 Friendly	Kedah B	1 – 0	Kedah U21	Alor Setar, Kedah, Malaysia
17:00 UTC+07:00	Syazuan Hazani 65'			Stadium: Darul Aman Stadium; Referee: Mohd Nasir Othman

7 October 2016 Friendly	Penang FA	1 – 2	Kedah FA	George Town, Pulau Pinang, Malaysia
21:00 UTC+07:00	Syawal Nordin 3' (og.)		Shane Smeltz 11'; Thiago Augusto 34' (pen.) Liridon (substituted on) 46'; Asri (substituted on) 46'; Sabree (substituted on) 46'; Shazuan Hazani (substituted on) 46'; Shafizan (substituted on) 46' Farhan Abu Bakar (substituted on) 46'	Stadium: Bandaraya Stadium; Referee: Muhamad Azwan Mohamad; Assistant referees: Syed Ahmad Ridzuan; Muhamad Adib Zulkifli; Fourth official: Kesava Raj

== Competitions ==
=== Overall ===
Competition	Started round	Final position / round	First match	Last match
Super League	Matchday 1	3rd	13 February 2016	21 October 2016
FA Cup	Round of 32	Semi-finals	19 February 2016	30 April 2016
Malaysia Cup	Group stage	Winners	13 July 2016	30 October 2016

Updated to match played 30 October 2016
Source: Competitions

=== Overview ===
Competition	Record							
Competition	Pld	W	D	L	GF	GA	GD	Win %
Super League	22	11	7	4	30	26	+4	50.00
FA Cup	6	4	1	1	15	7	+8	66.67
Malaysia Cup	11	7	3	1	20	8	+12	63.64
Total	39	22	11	6	65	41	+24	56.41

Last updated: 30 October 2016
Source: Competitions

=== Super League ===
The league will kick-off on 13 February and ends on 22 October 2016.

==== League table ====
Pos	Team	Pld	W	D	L	GF	GA	GD	Pts	Qualification or relegation
1	Johor Darul Ta'zim (C)	22	18	4	0	56	14	+42	58	Qualification to AFC Champions League preliminary round 2 (Note: Also qualification to AFC Cup group stage if failed to qualify for the AFC Champions League group stage.)
2	Felda United	22	13	4	5	47	27	+20	43	Qualification to AFC Cup group stage (Note: Since the winners of 2016 Piala FA, Johor Darul Ta'zim, currently qualify for AFC Champions League based on their league position, the spot awarded to the Piala FA winner (AFC Cup group stage) would be passed to the next best team in the table (in this case, the second-placed team).)
3	Kedah	22	11	7	4	30	26	+4	37 (Note: Kedah Football Association (Kedah FA) has been found guilty of putting the suspended player during the match against Pahang on August 3, 2016. Therefore, the Football Association of Malaysia (FAM) has been awarded 3 points for Pahang and Kedah sentenced deducted 3 points for the incident.)	
4	Kelantan	22	7	8	7	37	33	+4	29	
5	Selangor	22	7	7	8	28	27	+1	28	

Source: SPMB Football Association of Malaysia, Football Malaysia LLP
Rules for classification: 1) Points; 2) Goal difference; 3) Number of goals scored; 3) Number of goals against.
(C) Champions

==== Results summary ====
Overall								Home						Away					
Pld	W	D	L	GF	GA	GD	Pts	W	D	L	GF	GA	GD	W	D	L	GF	GA	GD
22	11	7	4	30	26	+4	40	9	2	0	17	6	+11	2	5	4	13	20	−7

Last updated: 21 October 2016.
Source: Super League fixtures and results

==== Results by round ====
Round	1	2	3	4	5	6	7	8	9	10	11	12	13	14	15	16	17	18	19	20	21	22
Ground	A	H	A	H	A	A	H	A	H	A	H	A	A	H	A	H	H	H	A	H	A	H
Result	L	W	D	W	D	D	D	L	D	D	W	D	L	W	L	W	W	W	W	W	W	W
Position	12	8	7	4	6	4	5	6	7	7	5	5	6	4	4	4	4	3	3	3	3	3

Updated to match(es) played on 21 October 2016. Source: Super League fixtures and results
A = Away; H = Home; W = Win; D = Draw; L = Loss

==== Fixtures and results ====
Win Draw Loss Postponed

===== First leg =====
13 February 2016 1 (#4)	Felda United FC (Kuala Lumpur)	2 – 0	Kedah FA	Jengka, Pahang, Malaysia
21:00 UTC+08:00	Syahid Zaidon (yellow card) 6'; Gilberto Carlos Marangoni (yellow card) 14'; Hasni Zaidi Jamian (yellow card) 57' (substituted off) 90+3'; Lutfulla Turaev 65'; Zah Rahan Krangar 69' (pen.); Adib Aizuddin Abdul Latif (yellow card) 71'; Hadin Azman (substituted off) 86'; Ahmad Syamim Yahya (substituted on) 86'; Abdul Shukur Jusoh (substituted off) 89'; Bobby Gonzales (substituted on) 89'; Mohd Firdaus Faudzi (substituted on) 90+3'	Report	Rizal Ghazali (yellow card) 39'; Kahê (substituted off) 67'; Syazwan Zainon (substituted on) 67'; Baddrol Bakhtiar (substituted off) 76'; Farhan Roslan (substituted on) 76'; Azmeer Yusof (yellow card) 90'	Stadium: Tun Abdul Razak Stadium; Attendance: 8,510; Referee: Mohd Amirul Izwan Yaacob; Assistant referees: Azman Ismail; Ismadi Ibrahim; Fourth official: Maizulhisham Mat Jusoh

16 February 2016 2 (#10)	Kedah FA	1 – 0	Terengganu FA	Alor Setar, Kedah, Malaysia
21:00 UTC+08:00	Kahê 43' (substituted off) 71'; Syazwan Zainon (substituted off) 68'; Fakri Saarani (substituted on) 68'; Syafiq Ahmad (substituted on) 71'; Liridon Krasniqi (substituted off) 90+1'; Halim Saari (substituted on) 90+1'	Report	Gustavo Fabián López (substituted off) 24'; Amirul Syahmi Asha'ri (substituted on) 24'; Ashari Samsudin (substituted off) 61'; Juan José Morales (substituted on) 61'; Joseph Kalang Tie (substituted off) 74'; Dhiyaulrahman Hasry (substituted on) 74'	Stadium: Darul Aman Stadium; Attendance: 17,000; Referee: Mohd Fairuzi Mat Desa; Assistant referees: Azmi Khalid; Muhammad Juhairi Idris; Fourth official: Shaharudin Man

27 February 2016 3 (#18)	Perak FA	0 – 0	Kedah FA	Ipoh, Perak, Malaysia
21:00 UTC+08:00	Amirul Azhan Aznan (yellow card) 58'; Vokhid Shodiev (substituted off) 67'; Fazrul Hazli Kadri (substituted on) 67'; Mohd Nasir Basharuddin (substituted off) 75'; Muhammad Ridzuan Azly (substituted on) 75'	Report	Sandro (yellow card) 44' (substituted off) 77'; Kahê (substituted off) 68'; Syafiq Ahmad (substituted on) 68'; Baddrol Bakhtiar (yellow card) 69'; Fakri Saarani (substituted on) 77'; Azmeer Yusof (yellow card) 81'; Khairul Helmi Johari (substituted off) 86'; Syazwan Tajuddin (substituted on) 86'; Ariff Farhan (yellow card) 89'	Stadium: Perak Stadium; Attendance: 20,600; Referee: Wan Mohd Tarmizi Wan Ibrahim; Assistant referees: Mohd Shahreen Che Omar; Azizul Hakim Mohamad Nor; Fourth official: Rafifi Anuar Abdullah

1 March 2016 4 (#20)	Kedah FA	2 – 1	Kelantan FA	Alor Setar, Kedah, Malaysia
21:00 UTC+08:00	Kahê 68' (substituted off) 90+1'; Syazwan Zainon (substituted off) 57'; Fakri Saarani (substituted on) 57'; Amar Rohidan (substituted off) 67'; Syafiq Ahmad (substituted on) 67' (goal) 82'; Farhan Roslan (substituted on) 90+1'	Report	Indra Putra 30' (yellow card) 61'; Wan Zack Haikal (substituted off) 48'; Wan Zaharulnizam Zakaria (substituted on) 48'; Mohd Badhri Mohd Radzi (substituted off) 69'; Norhafiz Zamani Misbah (substituted on) 69'; Noor Hazrul Mustafa (substituted off) 74'; Mohd Daudsu Jamaluddin (substituted on) 74'	Stadium: Darul Aman Stadium; Attendance: 16,500; Referee: Muhd Nazmi Nasaruddin; Assistant referees: Mohd Arif Shamil Abd Rasid; Mohammad Zairul Khalil Tan; Fourth official: Mohd Zulkifli Ahmad

12 March 2016 5 (#28)	Sarawak FA	1 – 1	Kedah FA	Kuching, Sarawak, Malaysia
20:15 UTC+08:00	Syahrul Azwari (yellow card) 35'; J. Partiban (substituted off) 38'; Rodney Celvin (substituted on) 38'; Hairol Mokhtar (substituted off) 68'; Shreen Tambi (substituted on) 68'; K. Gurusamy (substituted off) 86'; Rahim Razak (substituted on) 86'; Ndumba Makeche 90+2'	Report	Liridon Krasniqi (substituted off) 73'; Amirul Hysham (substituted on) 73'; Amar Rohidan (substituted off) 80'; Syafiq Ahmad (substituted on) 80'; Syazwan Zainon (substituted off) 80'; Farhan Roslan (substituted on) 80' (goal) 85'	Stadium: Sarawak State Stadium; Attendance: 4,200; Referee: Mohd Zamzaidi Katimin; Assistant referees: Mohd Abdul Suki Said; Abdul Harun Osman; Fourth official: Tiong Eng Tai

5 April 2016 6 (#32)	Selangor FA	2 – 2	Kedah FA	Selayang, Selangor, Malaysia
21:00 UTC+08:00	Nazmi Faiz (yellow card) 24'; R. Gopinathan 29'; Patrick Wleh 30'; Mohd Hafiz Kamal (yellow card) 57' (substituted off) 72'; Raimi Nor (yellow card) 66'; Andik Vermansyah (substituted off) 72'; Hazwan Bakri (substituted on) 72'; S. Veenod (substituted on) 72'; Mauro Olivi (substituted off) 79'; Adam Nor Azlin (substituted on) 79' (yellow card) 90+2'	Report	Syazwan Zainon 7' (substituted off) 22'; Syafiq Ahmad (substituted on) 22'; Bang Seung-hwan (substituted off) 34'; Syazwan Tajudin (substituted on) 34' (yellow card) 85'; Sandro 67' (pen.); Fakri Saarani (substituted off) 86'; Farhan Roslan (substituted on) 86'	Stadium: Selayang Stadium; Attendance: 8,063; Referee: Muhd Nazmi Nasaruddin; Assistant referees: Azman Ismail; Nojey Naking; Fourth official: Wan Mohd Tarmizi

9 April 2016 7 (#41)	Kedah FA	2 – 2	Penang FA	Alor Setar, Kedah, Malaysia
21:00 UTC+08:00	Liridon Krasniqi 24', 61'; Fakri Saarani (substituted off) 44'; Sandro (substituted on) 44'; Baddrol Bakhtiar (yellow card) 64' (substituted off) 79'; Syafiq Ahmad (substituted off) 64'; Farhan Roslan (substituted on) 64'; Bang Seung-hwan (substituted on) 79'	Report	Darwira Sazan (yellow card) 26' (goal) 86'; Matías Córdoba 30'; Syukur Saidin (substituted off) 64'; Fauzan Dzulkifli (substituted on) 64'; Faiz Subri (substituted off) 67'; Jafri Firdaus (substituted on) 67'; Mazlizam Mohamad (yellow card) 70'; S. Kumaahran (substituted off) 76'; Faizat Ghazali (substituted on) 76'	Stadium: Darul Aman Stadium; Attendance: 8,400; Referee: Zulkifli Ahmad; Assistant referees: Muhamad Mu'azi Zainal Abidin; Mohamed Faiz Che Mud; Fourth official: Mohd Zulkifli Ahmad

20 April 2016 8 (#45)	T-Team FC (Terengganu)	4 – 1	Kedah FA	Kuala Terengganu, Terengganu, Malaysia
21:00 UTC+08:00	Asrol Ibrahim 10' (substituted off) 76'; Zulhanizam Shafine (substituted off) 46'; Takhiyuddin Roslan (substituted on) 46' (goal) 78'; Makan Konaté 66'; Badrul Hisyam Morris (substituted on) 76'; Safawi Rasid 83'; Abdoulaye Maïga (substituted off) 87'; Marzuki Yusof (substituted on) 87'	Report	Baddrol Bakhtiar 43' (substituted off) 60'; Abdul Halim Saari (substituted on) 60'; Kahê (substituted off) 62'; Fakri Saarani (substituted on) 62'; Bang Seung-hwan (substituted off) 73'; Syazwan Tajuddin (substituted on) 73' (yellow card) 82'	Stadium: Sultan Ismail Nasiruddin Shah Stadium; Attendance: 4,120; Referee: Mohammad Zamzaidi Katimin; Assistant referees: Mohd Khalid Mohd Aris; Mohd Azha Khalid; Fourth official: Ramli Mat Dahan

23 April 2016 9 (#52)	Kedah FA	1 – 1	Johor Darul Ta'zim F.C.	Alor Setar, Kedah, Malaysia
21:00 UTC+08:00	Baddrol Bakhtiar 1'; Kahê (yellow card) 26'; Farhan Roslan (substituted off) 31'; Syafiq Ahmad (substituted on) 31'; Halim Saari (substituted off) 59'; Sandro (substituted on) 59'; Rizal Ghazali (substituted off) 83'; Ariff Farhan (substituted on) 83'	Report	S. Kunanlan (substituted off) 15'; Jasazrin Jamaluddin (substituted on) 15'; Safiq Rahim (yellow card) 24'; Amirul Hadi (substituted off) 37'; Amri Yahyah (substituted on) 37' (yellow card) 76'; Díaz (yellow card) 41'; Lucero 45+3' (pen.); Hariss Harun (yellow card) 65'; Mahali Jasuli (substituted off) 80'; Azniee Taib (substituted on) 80'	Stadium: Darul Aman Stadium; Attendance: 8,763; Referee: Mohd Amirul Izwan Yacob; Assistant referees: Maswari Mislan; Asmadi Noor Hasni; Fourth official: Mohamad Izzat Izaini

3 May 2016 10 (#56)	Pahang FC	v	Kedah FA	Kuantan, Pahang, Malaysia
21:00 UTC+08:00				Stadium: Darul Makmur Stadium

4 May 2016 10 (#56)	Pahang FC	1 – 1	Kedah FA	Kuantan, Pahang, Malaysia
21:00 UTC+08:00	Shah Amirul Zamri (substituted off) 40'; Helmi Abdullah (substituted on) 40'; Germán Pacheco 64'; D. Saarvindran (substituted off) 72'; Mohd Shahrizan Salleh (substituted on) 72'; Mohd Fauzi Roslan (substituted off) 82'; Faizal Abdul Rani (substituted on) 82'	Report	Halim Saari (substituted off) 21'; Fakri Saarani (substituted on) 21' (goal) 26'; Liridon Krasniqi (yellow card) 51'; Kahê (substituted off) 67'; Syazwan Zainon (substituted on) 67'; Farhan Roslan (substituted off) 78'; Syafiq Ahmad (substituted on) 78'	Stadium: Darul Makmur Stadium; Attendance: 3,508; Referee: Teoh Hee Loon; Assistant referees: Ahmad Faisal Mamat; Shahidan Mohd Adnan; Fourth official: Saiful Mohd Rodzali

18 May 2016 11 (#63)	Kedah FA	2 – 0	(Malaysia) PDRM FA	Alor Setar, Kedah, Malaysia
21:00 UTC+08:00	Kahê 2', 21'; Fakri Saarani (substituted off) 63'; Syafiq Ahmad (substituted on) 63'; Farhan Roslan (yellow card) 75' (substituted off) 77'; Syazwan Zainon (substituted on) 77'	Report	Faizal Muhammad (substituted off) 70'; Amir Saiful Badeli (substituted on) 70'; Fekry Tajudin (yellow card) 79' (substituted off) 81'; Shafiq Jamal (substituted on) 81'; Lot Abu Hassan (yellow card) 82' (substituted off) 87'; Syauki Wahab (substituted on) 87'	Stadium: Darul Aman Stadium; Attendance: 3,338; Referee: Mohd Fairuzi Mat Desa; Assistant referees: Ismadi Ibrahim; Asmadi Hasni

===== Second leg =====
22 May 2016 12 (#69)	PDRM FA (Malaysia)	v	Kedah FA	Krubong, Melaka, Malaysia
21:00 UTC+08:00				Stadium: Hang Jebat Stadium

21 May 2016 12 (#69)	PDRM FA (Malaysia)	1 – 1	Kedah FA	Shah Alam, Selangor, Malaysia
21:00 UTC+08:00	Syauki Wahab 43'; K. Reuben (yellow card) 57'; Abdul Latiff Suhaimi (yellow card) 61' (substituted off) 87'; Syafiq Jamal (substituted off) 73'; Hazsyafiq Hamzah (substituted on) 73'; Willfred Jabun (yellow card) 74'; Lot Abu Hassan (substituted off) 80'; Nizam Rodzi (substituted on) 80'; Azrul Azman (substituted on) 87'	Report	Liridon Krasniqi (yellow card) 42' (goal) 90+3'; Kahê (substituted off) 46'; Syafiq Ahmad (substituted on) 46'; Bang Seung-Hwan (yellow card) 49'; Fakri Saarani (substituted off) 78'; Hanif Mat Dzahir (substituted on) 78'; Rizal Ghazali (yellow card) 81'; Syazwan Zainon (substituted off) 86'; Arif Farhan (substituted on) 86'	Stadium: Shah Alam Stadium; Attendance: 2,000; Referee: Muhammad Nazmi Nasaruddin; Assistant referees: Azman Ismail; Nojey Naking; Fourth official: Ahmad Tajuddin Mohd Yusoff

25 May 2016 13 (#75)	Kedah FA	v	Pahang FC	Alor Setar, Kedah, Malaysia
21:00 UTC+08:00				Stadium: Darul Aman Stadium

3 August 2016 13 (#75)	Kedah FA	1 – 0	Pahang FC	Alor Setar, Kedah, Malaysia
21:00 UTC+08:00	Shane Smeltz 29' (pen.); Farhan Roslan (substituted off) 58'; Amirul Hisyam (substituted on) 58'; Syafiq Ahmad (substituted off) 69'; Sabre Abu (substituted on) 69'; Bang Seung-hwan (yellow card) 83' (substituted off) 87'; Syawal Nordin (substituted on) 87'	Report	Claudio Meneses (yellow card) 41'; Kogileswaran Raj (substituted off) 46'; Nor Azam (substituted on) 46'; Faisal Rosli (substituted off) 76'; D. Saarvindran (substituted on) 76'; Pablo Vranjicán (yellow card) 83'; A. Salamon Raj (substituted off) 84'; Fauzi Roslan (substituted on) 84'	Stadium: Darul Aman Stadium; Attendance: 7,836; Referee: Mohd Amirul Izwan Yaacob; Assistant referees: Muhd Mu'azi Zainal Abidin; Wan Salman Wan Yusof; Fourth official: Mohamad Izzat Izaini

16 July 2016 14 (#83)	JDT FC (Johor)	5 – 0	Kedah FA	Johor Bahru, Johor, Malaysia
21:00 UTC+08:00	Safiq Rahim 28', 41'; Hariss Harun (yellow card) 45' (substituted off) 84'; Marcos Antonio 67'; Amri Yahyah (substituted off) 72'; Azinee Taib (substituted on) 72'; Pereyra Diaz 80', 85'; Azamuddin Akil (substituted off) 82'; S. Chanturu (substituted on) 82'; Amirul Hadi (substituted on) 84'	Report	Syazwan Zainon (substituted off) 63'; Farhan Roslan (substituted on) 63'; Baddrol Bakhtiar (yellow card) 64' (substituted off) 74'; Thiago Augusto (substituted off) 68'; Syafiq Ahmad (substituted on) 68'; Ariff Farhan (substituted on) 74'	Stadium: Tan Sri Dato Haji Hassan Yunos Stadium; Attendance: 10,580; Referee: Khirulazuan Kidam; Assistant referees: Mohd Khalid Mohd Aris; Norzambri Ibrahim; Fourth official: Mohd Nafeez Abd Wahab

23 July 2016 15 (#86)	Kedah FA	1 – 0	(Terengganu) T-Team FC	Alor Setar, Kedah, Malaysia
21:00 UTC+08:00	Shane Smeltz 50'; Syazwan Zainon (substituted off) 69'; Haniff Mat Dzahir (substituted on) 69'; Syafiq Ahmad (substituted off) 78'; Azmeer Yusof (substituted on) 78'; Halim Saari (substituted off) 87'; Amar Rohidan (substituted on) 87'	Report	Badrul Hisyam Morris (substituted off) 63'; Asrol Ibrahim (substituted on) 63'; Patrick Cruz (yellow card) 68'; Safawi Rasid (substituted off) 80'; Ramzul Zahini (substituted on) 80'; Zulhanizam Shafine (substituted off) 84'; Izzaq Faris Ramlan (substituted on) 84'	Stadium: Darul Aman Stadium; Attendance: 5,450; Referee: Mohd Faruzi Mat Desa; Assistant referees: Abdul Harun Osman; Mohd Jais Bujang; Fourth official: Muhd Shahrul Amin

26 July 2016 16 (#96)	Penang FA	3 – 2	Kedah FA	George Town, Penang, Malaysia
21:00 UTC+08:00	Rafiuddin Rodin (yellow card) 13'; Jeong Seok-Min 24', 36'; Matías Córdoba 47'; Fauzan Dzulkifli (substituted off) 64'; Azrul Ahmad (substituted on) 64'; Fitri Omar (substituted off) 76'; Farisham Ismail (substituted on) 76'; S. Kumaahran (substituted off) 88'; Failee Ghazli (substituted on) 88'	Report	Liridon Krasniqi 14' (yellow card) 45+2' (yellow-red card) 67'; Shazuan Ashraf Mathews (substituted off) 53'; Thiago Augusto (substituted on) 53' (goal) 76' (pen.); Rizal Ghazali (yellow card) 60' (substituted off) 61'; Farhan Roslan (substituted on) 61'; Halim Shaari (substituted off) 73'; Hanif Mat Dzahir (substituted on) 73'; Baddrol Bakhtiar (yellow card) 90+2'	Stadium: City Stadium; Attendance: 12,218; Referee: Suhaimi Mat Hassan; Assistant referees: Muhamad Mu'azi Zainal Abidin; Hairul Azeman Azemin; Fourth official: Abdul Rahim Abdullah

6 August 2016 17 (#97)	Kedah FA	1 – 0	Selangor FA	Alor Setar, Kedah, Malaysia
21:00 UTC+08:00	Bang Seung-Hwan 47'; Azmeer Yusof (substituted off) 62'; Sabre Abu (substituted on) 62'; Syazwan Zainon (substituted off) 74'; Syafiq Ahmad (substituted on) 74'; Ariff Farhan (substituted off) 75'; Shafizan Hashim (substituted on) 75'	Report	Bunyamin Umar (substituted off) 67'; Adam Nor Azlin (substituted on) 67'; Hadi Yahya (substituted off) 69'; Faizzudin Abidin (substituted on) 69'; R. Gopinathan (substituted off) 89'; Rizal Fahmi (substituted on) 89'	Stadium: Darul Aman Stadium; Attendance: 10,064; Referee: Muhd Zamzaidi Katimin; Assistant referees: Mohd Juhairi Idris; Fazrul Izwan Mohd Zin; Fourth official: Dhanabalasingam

16 August 2016 18 (#108)	Kedah FA	2 – 1	Sarawak FA	Alor Setar, Kedah, Malaysia
21:00 UTC+08:00	Tommy Mawat Bada 64' (o.g.); Azmeer Yusof (substituted off) 70'; Rizal Ghazali (substituted on) 70'; Liridon Krasniqi 74' (pen.); Halim Saari (substituted off) 76'; Amirul Hisyam (substituted on) 76'; Bang Seung-hwan (yellow card) 77'; Syazwan Zainon (substituted off) 90+2'; Asri Mardzuki (substituted on) 90+2'	Report	Ndumba Makeche 52'; J. Partiban (substituted off) 76'; Syahrul Azwari (substituted on) 76'; Nur Shamie Iszuan Amin (substituted off) 80'; Shahrol Saperi (substituted on) 80'	Stadium: Darul Aman Stadium; Attendance: 6,270; Referee: Mohd Amirul Izwan Yaacob; Assistant referees: Wan Salman Wan Yusof; Mohd Hariff Md Akhir; Fourth official: Mohd Izzat Izaini Ali

23 August 2016 19 (#110)	Kelantan FA	v	Kedah FA	Kota Bharu, Kelantan, Malaysia
21:00 UTC+08:00				Stadium: Sultan Mohammad IV Stadium

24 August 2016 19 (#110)	Kelantan FA	1 – 2	Kedah FA	Kota Bharu, Kelantan, Malaysia
21:00 UTC+08:00	Qayyum Marjoni Sabil (yellow card) 28'; Badhri Radzi (substituted off) 46'; Indra Putra Mahayuddin (substituted on) 46' (yellow card) 61'; Wan Zaharulnizam Zakaria (substituted off) 69'; Wander Luiz (substituted on) 69'; Wan Zack Haikal 70'	Report	Halim Saari 20'; Farhan Roslan (yellow card) 34'; Azmeer Yusof (yellow card) 43'; Amar Rohidan (substituted off) 56'; Syafiq Ahmad (substituted on) 56'; Thiago Augusto (substituted off) 69'; Shane Smeltz (substituted on) 69'; Liridon Krasniqi (substituted off) 79'; Amirul Hisyam (substituted on) 79'; Baddrol Bakhtiar 90+2'	Stadium: Sultan Mohammad IV Stadium; Attendance: 2,048; Referee: Muhd Nazmi Nasaruddin; Assistant referees: Azmi Khalid; Mohd Junaidy Abd Samad; Fourth official: Mohd Hasrol Mohd Amir

27 August 2016 20 (#119)	Kedah FA	v	Perak FA	Alor Setar, Kedah, Malaysia
21:00 UTC+08:00				Stadium: Darul Aman Stadium

10 September 2016 20 (#119)	Kedah FA	3 – 1	Perak FA	Alor Setar, Kedah, Malaysia
21:00 UTC+08:00	Shane Smeltz 7', 59'; Syazwan Zainon (substituted off) 69'; Halim Saari (substituted on) 69'; Ariff Farhan Isa (yellow card) 72'; Amirul Hisyam (substituted off) 78'; Farhan Roslan (substituted on) 78'; Khairul Helmi Johari (yellow card) 80'; Baddrol Bakhtiar (substituted off) 81'; Syafiq Ahmad (substituted on) 81'; Thiago Augusto 85'	Report	Tuah Iskandar (yellow card) 18' (substituted off) 46'; Raffi Nagoorgani (substituted off) 46'; Syazwan Zaipol Bahari (substituted on) 46'; Amirul Waie Yaacob (substituted on) 46'; Elias Fernandes (substituted off) 46'; Ganiesh Gunasegaran (substituted on) 46'; Thiago Junior 82'	Stadium: Darul Aman Stadium; Attendance: 16,500; Referee: Suhaimi Mat Hassan; Assistant referees: Mohd Hariff Md Akhir; Ahmad Azuan Mohd Rashdi; Fourth official: Mohd Izzat Izaini Ali; Man of the Match: Shane Smeltz

24 September 2016 21 (#124)	Terengganu FA	0 – 3	Kedah FA	Kuala Terengganu, Terengganu, Malaysia
21:00 UTC+08:00	Norshahrul Idlan (substituted off) 50'; Juan José Morales (substituted on) 50'; Sharin Sapien (substituted off) 63'; Nasril Izzat Jalil (substituted on) 63'; Ashari Samsudin (substituted off) 73'; Naim Asraaf Nordin (substituted off) 73'; Mohd Fakhrurazi Musa (yellow card) 74'	Report	Thiago Augusto 13', 80'; Farhan Roslan (substituted off) 46'; Syafiq Ahmad (substituted on) 46'; Shane Smeltz 63' (substituted off) 73'; Syazwan Zainon (substituted off) 73'; Azmeer Yusof (substituted on) 73'; Hanif Mat Dzahir (substituted on) 73'	Stadium: Sultan Mizan Zainal Abidin Stadium; Attendance: 768; Referee: YM Syed Azhar Syed Kamar; Assistant referees: Mohd Hariff Md Akhir; Mohd Junaidy Abd Samad; Fourth official: Hamdan Awang

22 October 2016 22 (#130)	Kedah FA	v	(Kuala Lumpur) Felda United FC	Alor Setar, Kedah, Malaysia
21:00 UTC+08:00				Stadium: Darul Aman Stadium

21 October 2016 22 (#130)	Kedah FA	1 – 0	(Kuala Lumpur) Felda United FC	Alor Setar, Kedah, Malaysia
21:00 UTC+08:00	Hanif (substituted off) 62'; Smeltz (substituted on) 62' (goal) 82'; T. Augusto (substituted off) 69'; Farhan (substituted on) 69'; Baddrol (substituted off) 82'; Syafiq (substituted on) 82'	Report	Fakri Saarani (substituted off) 70'; Bobby Gonzales (substituted on) 70'; Hasni Zaidi Jamian (yellow card) 72'; Syamim Yahya (substituted off) 77'; Mohd Ridzuan Abdunloh (substituted on) 77' (yellow card) 89'; Syahid Zaidon (substituted off) 88'; Khairul Ismail (substituted on) 88'	Stadium: Darul Aman Stadium; Attendance: 3,300; Referee: Mohamad Zamzaidi Katimin; Assistant referees: Hairul Azeman Azemin; Fazrul Izwan Mohd Zin; Fourth official: Mohd Izzat Izaini Ali

==== Results overview ====
Win Draw Loss

Team	Home score	Away score	Double
(Kuala Lumpur) FELDA United	1 – 0	2 – 0	No
Johor Darul Ta'zim	1 – 1	5 – 0	No
Kelantan	2 – 1	1 – 2	Yes
Pahang	1 – 0	1 – 1	No
(Malaysia) PDRM	2 – 0	1 – 1	No
Penang	2 – 2	3 – 2	No
Perak	3 – 1	0 – 0	No
Sarawak	2 – 1	1 – 1	No
Selangor	1 – 0	2 – 2	No
(Terengganu) T–Team	1 – 0	4 – 1	No
Terengganu	1 – 0	0 – 3	Yes

As of matches played on 21 October 2016.

=== FA Cup ===
The tournament will kick-off on 19 February 2016.

==== Results summary ====
Overall								Home						Away					
Pld	W	D	L	GF	GA	GD	Pts	W	D	L	GF	GA	GD	W	D	L	GF	GA	GD
6	4	1	1	15	7	+8	13	3	1	0	12	3	+9	1	0	1	3	4	−1

Last updated: 30 April 2016.
Source: FA Cup fixtures and results

==== Knockout phase ====
===== Round of 32 =====
19 February 2016 Round 2	Kedah FA	8 – 0	(Selangor) Megah Murni FC	Alor Setar, Kedah, Malaysia
21:00 UTC+08:00	Azmeer Yusof 6'; Sandro 12' (substituted off) 46'; Syazwan Zainon 25', 39'; Amirul Hisyam 28'; Kahê 37', 90', 90+2' (pen.); Liridon Krasniqi (substituted off) 46'; Halim Saari (substituted on) 46'; Fakri Saarani (substituted on) 46'; Baddrol Bakhtiar (substituted off) 69'; Farhan Roslan (substituted on) 69'	Report	Ilyaf Abdullah Sani (substituted off) 46'; Noor Hafis (substituted on) 46'; Syafiq Johari (substituted off) 67'; Paneerselvam Palaniandy (substituted on) 67'; Badrul Hisyam (substituted off) 74'; Darshen Ganesan (substituted on) 74'; Hasrul Abu Bakar (yellow card) 90+2'	Stadium: Darul Aman Stadium; Attendance: 6,000; Referee: Ku Alauddin Ku Muhammad; Assistant referees: Wan Salman Wan Yusoff; Abdul Halim Mohd Ramlan; Fourth official: Mohd Zulkifli Ahmad

===== Round of 16 =====
4 March 2016 Round 3	Kedah FA	1 – 1 (a.e.t.) (5 – 4 p)	Kelantan FA	Alor Setar, Kedah, Malaysia
21:00 UTC+08:00	Amirul Hisyam (substituted off) 23'; Amar Rohidan (substituted on) 23' (yellow card) 116'; Rizal Ghazali (substituted off) 46'; Khairul Helmi Johari (substituted on) 46' (goal) 47'; Azmeer Yusof (yellow card) 86'; Badrol Bakhtiar (substituted off) 101'; Syafiq Ahmad (substituted on) 101'	Report	Indra Putra (yellow card) 18'; Jonathan McKain (yellow card) 19' (goal) 34'; Daudsu Jamaluddin (substituted off) 55'; Zairul Fitree (substituted on) 55'; Baže Ilijoski (substituted off) 73'; Zaharulnizam Zakaria (substituted on) 73'; Nik Shahrul Azim (yellow card) 86'; Dramane Traoré (substituted off) 96'; Khairul Izuan (substituted on) 96'; Wan Zack Haikal (yellow card) 107'	Stadium: Darul Aman Stadium; Attendance: 17,500; Referee: Syed Azhar Syed Kamar; Assistant referees: Azmi Khalid; Asmadi Noor Hasni; Fourth official: Muhammad Shahrul Amin
	Penalties
	Sandro da Silva (penalty scored); Kahê (penalty scored); Syafiq Ahmad (penalty scored); Bang Seung-hwan (penalty scored); Liridon Krasniqi (penalty scored)		(penalty scored) Jonathan McKain; (penalty scored) Indra Putra; (penalty scored) Wan Zack Haikal; (penalty scored) Jonatan Lucca; (penalty missed) Khairul Izuan

===== Quarter-finals =====
18 March 2016 First leg	Sabah FA	1 – 2	Kedah FA	Kota Kinabalu, Sabah, Malaysia
20:15 UTC+08:00	Azizan Nordin (yellow card) 34' (substituted off) 49'; Rawilson Batuil (yellow card) 43'; Shafuan Adli Shaari (substituted on) 49'; Badrul Affendy (substituted off) 73'; Randy Baruh (substituted on) 73'; Leopold Alphonso (yellow card) 76'; Igor Cerina 90+5'	Report	Bang Seung-hwan 39'; Amirul Hisyam (yellow card) 56'; Baddrol Bakhtiar 69'; Sandro (substituted off) 80'; Syafiq Ahmad (substituted on) 80'; Syazwan Zainon (substituted off) 82'; Farhan Roslan (substituted on) 82'; Kahê (substituted off) 87'; Fakri Saarani (substituted on) 87'	Stadium: Likas Stadium; Attendance: 10,000; Referee: Mohd Amirul Izwan Yaacob; Assistant referees: Muhammad Mu'az Zainal Abidin; Mohd Khalid Mohd Aris; Fourth official: S. Sittharanjanan

1 April 2016 Second leg	Kedah FA	1 – 1 (3 – 2 agg.)	Sabah FA	Alor Setar, Kedah, Malaysia
21:00 UTC+08:00	Kahê 23' (pen.) (substituted off) 61'; Sandro (substituted on) 61'; Farhan Roslan (substituted off) 61'; Syafiq Ahmad (substituted on) 61'; Liridon Krasniqi (yellow card) 64'	Report	Azizan Nordin (yellow card) 20' (substituted off) 74'; Igor Cerina (yellow card) 22'; Marco Tulio (yellow card) 33'; Prince Nnake (substituted off) 39'; Azrie Basalie (substituted on) 39'; Ummareng Bacok 59' (substituted off) 70'; Julamri Muhammad (substituted on) 70'; Radzi Mohd Hussin (substituted on) 74'	Stadium: Darul Aman Stadium; Attendance: 24,500; Referee: Mohd Fairuzi Mat Desa; Assistant referees: Muhammad Juhairi Idris; Wan Salman Wan Yusoff; Fourth official: Shaharudin Man

===== Semi-finals =====
16 April 2016 First leg	Kedah FA	2 – 1	Johor Darul Ta'zim F.C.	Alor Setar, Kedah, Malaysia
21:00 UTC+08:00	Baddrol Bakhtiar (yellow card) 8' (substituted off) 89'; Farhan Roslan 15'; Khairul Helmi Johari (yellow card) 29'; Sandro 45' (substituted off) 73'; Amirul Hisyam (yellow card) 62'; Syazwan Tajuddin (substituted on) 73'; Kahê (substituted off) 79'; Fakri Saarani (substituted on) 79'; Syafiq Ahmad (substituted off) 89'; Liridon Krasniqi (yellow card) 90+5'	Report	Hariss Harun (yellow card) 10' (substituted off) 83'; Lucero 27'; Fazly Mazlan (yellow card) 32'; Azamuddin Akil (substituted off) 46'; Azniee Taib (substituted on) 46'; Amri Yahyah (substituted off) 59'; Amirul Hadi (substituted on) 59'; S. Kunanlan (yellow card) 64'; Safee Sali (substituted on) 83'	Stadium: Darul Aman Stadium; Attendance: 23,400; Referee: Sittharanjanan; Assistant referees: Azman Ismail

30 April 2016 Second leg	Johor Darul Ta'zim F.C.	3 – 1 (4 – 3 agg.)	Kedah FA	Johor Bahru, Johor, Malaysia
21:00 UTC+08:00	Pereyra Díaz 23', 89' (yellow card) 90+2'; Lucero 54'; Azniee Taib (substituted off) 67'; Amirul Hadi (substituted on) 67'; Azamuddin Akil (substituted off) 76'; Chanturu Suppiah (substituted on) 76'; Hariss Harun (substituted off) 79'; Amri Yahyah (substituted on) 79'; Fazly Mazlan (yellow card) 84'	Report	Syazwan Tajuddin (substituted off) 15'; Osman Yusof (substituted on) 15'; Bang Seung-hwan (yellow card) 20'; Amar Rohidan (substituted off) 59'; Fakri Saarani (substituted on) 59' (goal) 68'; Farhan Roslan (yellow card) 90+1'	Stadium: Tan Sri Dato Haji Hassan Yunos Stadium; Attendance: 25,163; Referee: Syed Azhar Syed Kamar; Assistant referees: Mohd Yusri Mohammad; Anuar Musa; Fourth official: Wan Mohd Tarmizi; Goal-line assistants: Suresh Jayaraman; Teo Hee Loon

=== Malaysia Cup ===
The tournament will kick-off on 12 July 2016.

==== Results summary ====
Overall								Home						Away					
Pld	W	D	L	GF	GA	GD	Pts	W	D	L	GF	GA	GD	W	D	L	GF	GA	GD
11	7	3	1	20	8	+12	24	4	1	1	12	6	+6	3	2	0	8	2	+6

Last updated: 30 October 2016.
Source: Malaysia Cup fixtures and results

==== Group stage ====
Pos	Team	Pld	W	D	L	GF	GA	GD	Pts	Qualification	KED	TTE	JDT	SRW
1	Kedah	6	4	1	1	12	6	+6	13	Advance to knockout phase	—	0–1	0–0	4–3
2	(Terengganu) T–Team	6	3	1	2	8	5	+3	10	Advance to knockout phase	0–2	—	2–2	3–0
3	Johor Darul Ta'zim II	6	1	4	1	6	6	0	7		2–3	1–0	—	0–0
4	Sarawak	6	0	2	4	4	13	−9	2		0–3	0–2	1–1	—

Updated to match(es) played on 19 August 2016. Source: FAM FMLLP

Win Draw Loss Postponed

13 July 2016 1 (#A2)	Kedah FA	4 – 3	Sarawak FA	Alor Setar, Kedah, Malaysia
21:00 UTC+08:00	Liridon Krasniqi 15' (pen.), 45+2' (pen.); Bang Seung-hwan (yellow card) 47'; Baddrol Bakhtiar 58'; Thiago Augusto 66'; Syazwan Zainon (substituted off) 60'; Farhan Roslan (substituted on) 60'; Amirul Hisyam (yellow card) 61'; Halim Saari (substituted off) 63'; Shane Smeltz (substituted on) 63'; Thiago Augusto (substituted off) 74'; Rizal Ghazali (substituted on) 74'	Report	Ndumba Makeche 26', 48'; Nur Shamie Iszuan Amin 29' (substituted off) 70'; Júnior (yellow card) 39'; Dennis Teah Baysah (yellow card) 45+1'; Hairol Mokhtar (red card) 45+1'; Ashri Chuchu (substituted off) 46'; Ronny Harun (substituted on) 46'; Gilmar (yellow card) 47'; Dzulazlan Ibrahim (yellow card) 54'; Partiban K. Janasekaran (substituted on) 70' (yellow card) 78'; Shahrol Saperi (substituted off) 70'; Shreen Tambi (substituted on) 70'	Stadium: Darul Aman Stadium; Attendance: 17,000; Referee: M. Nazmi Nasaruddin; Assistant referees: Azmi Khalid; M. Azanor Huslan; Fourth official: Mohamad Izzat Izaini

20 July 2016 2 (#A4)	T–Team F.C. (Terengganu)	0 – 2	Kedah FA	Kuala Terengganu, Terengganu, Malaysia
21:00 UTC+08:00	Marzuki Yusof (substituted off) 54'; Safawi Rasid (substituted on) 54'; Tahiyuddin Roslan (substituted off) 70'; Zulhanizam Shafine (substituted on) 70'; Asrol Ibrahim (substituted off) 83'; Ramzul Zahini Adnan (substituted on) 83'; Patrick Cruz (yellow card) 86'	Report	Shane Smeltz 8', 16' (substituted off) 68'; Azmeer Yusof (substituted on) 68' (yellow card) 73'; Syazwan Zainon (substituted off) 77'; Shazuan Ashraf Mathews (substituted on) 77'; Ariff Farhan (yellow card) 86'; Osman Yusof (substituted off) 87'; Syawal Nordin (substituted on) 87'	Stadium: Sultan Ismail Nasiruddin Shah Stadium; Attendance: 2,334; Referee: Mohd Amirul Izwan Yaacob; Assistant referees: Azman Ismail; Fazrul Izwan Mohd Zin; Fourth official: Hamdan Awang

29 July 2016 3 (#A5)	Kedah FA	0 – 0	Johor Darul Ta'zim II F.C.	Alor Setar, Kedah, Malaysia
21:00 UTC+08:00	Azmeer Yusof (yellow card) 19'; Syafiq Ahmad (substituted off) 46'; Thiago Augusto (substituted on) 46'; Syazwan Zainon (substituted off) 84'; Ariff Farhan Isa (substituted on) 84'; Baddrol Bakhtiar (yellow card) 90+1'	Report	Izaffiq Ruzi (yellow card) 22' (substituted off) 46'; Fandi Othman (substituted on) 46'; Syafiq Heelmi (substituted off) 60'; Irfan Fazail (substituted on) 60'; Nicholas Swirad (substituted off) 84'; Che Rashid Che Halim (substituted on) 84'; Paulo Rangel (yellow card) 90+3'; Rafael Bonfim (yellow card) 90+4'	Stadium: Darul Aman Stadium; Attendance: 14,000; Referee: S. Sittharajan; Assistant referees: Ismadi Ibrahim; Asmadi Noor Hasni; Fourth official: Shaharudin Man

9 August 2016 4 (#A7)	Johor Darul Ta'zim II F.C.	2 – 3	Kedah FA	Pasir Gudang, Johor, Malaysia
21:00 UTC+08:00	Paulo Rangel 35'; Baihakki Khaizan (yellow card) 44'; Zaquan Adha 45'; Fandi Othman (substituted off) 46'; Shafiq Shaharudin (substituted on) 46'; Che Rashid Che Halim (substituted off) 60'; Syazwan Andik (substituted on) 60' (yellow card) 62'; Akram Mahinan (substituted off) 71'; Hadi Fayyadh (substituted on) 71'	Report	Shane Smeltz 13' (substituted off) 70'; Syazwan Zainon 36' (yellow card) 42'; Hanif Mat Dzahir (substituted off) 53'; Farhan Roslan (substituted on) 53'; Baddrol Bakhtiar 56'; Syafiq Ahmad (substituted on) 70'; Shafizan Hashim (substituted off) 88'; Sabre Abu (substituted on) 88'	Stadium: Pasir Gudang Corporation Stadium; Attendance: 3,785; Referee: Muhammad Zamzaidi Katimin; Assistant referees: Azman Ismail; Busrah Eri; Fourth official: Helmi Ali

13 August 2016 5 (#A10)	Kedah FA	0 – 1	(Terengganu) T–Team F.C.	Alor Setar, Kedah, Malaysia
21:00 UTC+08:00	Syafiq Ahmad (substituted off) 46'; Thiago Augusto (substituted on) 46'; Farhan Roslan (yellow card) 56' (substituted off) 61'; Syazwan Zainon (substituted on) 61'; Syawal Nordin (yellow card) 79'	Report	Safawi Rasid (substituted off) 58'; Marzuki Yusof (substituted on) 58'; Abdoulaye Maïga 58'; Patrick Cruz (substituted off) 65'; Akhir Bahari (substituted on) 65'; Kamal Azizi (yellow card) 76'; Nor Hakim Hassan (substituted off) 90+2'; Ramzul Zahini Adnan (substituted on) 90+2'	Stadium: Darul Aman Stadium; Attendance: 9,683; Referee: Razlan Jeffri Ali; Assistant referees: Muhammad Juhairi Idris; Muhd Zairul Khalil Tan; Fourth official: Mohamad Izzat Izaini

19 August 2016 6 (#A12)	Sarawak FA	0 – 3	Kedah FA	Kuching, Sarawak, Malaysia
20:15 UTC+08:00	K. Thanaraj (yellow card) 39' (substituted off) 79'; Hafis Saperi (substituted off) 52'; J. Partiban (substituted on) 52'; Mazwandi Zekeria (yellow card) 63'; Shreen Tambi (substituted off) 71'; Dalglish Papin Test (substituted on) 71'; Nur Shamie Iszuan Amin (substituted on) 79'	Report	Shane Smeltz (yellow card) 39' (substituted off) 75'; Thiago Augusto 53'; Farhan Roslan (yellow card) 56'; Liridon Krasniqi 71'; Halim Saari (substituted on) 75'; Syazwan Zainon (substituted off) 75'; Rizal Ghazali (substituted on) 75'; Khairul Helmi Johari (substituted off) 82'; Osman Yusof (substituted on) 82'; Bang Seung-hwan 88'	Stadium: Sarawak State Stadium; Attendance: 222; Referee: Khirulazuan Kidam; Assistant referees: Mohammad Juhairi; Ahmad Azuan Mohd Rashdi; Fourth official: Tiong Eng Tai

==== Knockout phase ====
===== Quarter-finals =====
28 August 2016 First leg	Negeri Sembilan FA	0 – 0	Kedah FA	Paroi, Negeri Sembilan, Malaysia
21:00 UTC+08:00	Ashmawi Yakin (substituted off) 46'; Danish Haziq (substituted on) 46'; Nasriq Baharom (yellow card) 74'; R. Aroon Kumar (substituted off) 78'; Sabri Sahar (substituted on) 78'; Afiq Azmi (substituted off) 90'; Sean Eugene Selvaraj (substituted on) 90'	Report	Shane Smeltz (yellow card) 70'; Syazwan Zainon (substituted off) 70'; Farhan Roslan (substituted on) 70'	Stadium: Tuanku Abdul Rahman Stadium; Attendance: 7,346; Referee: Saifol Md Rodzali; Assistant referees: Anuwar Musa; Mohd Abd Suki Said; Fourth official: Muhammad Nasruddin Tamrin; Man of the Match: Kaharuddin Rahman ( Negeri Sembilan FA)

17 September 2016 Second leg	Kedah FA	5 – 0 (5 – 0 agg.)	Negeri Sembilan FA	Alor Setar, Kedah, Malaysia
21:00 UTC+08:00	Shane Smeltz 24', 33' (substituted off) 55'; Thiago Augusto 39', 50'; Hanif Mat Dzahir (substituted on) 55'; Syazwan Zainon (substituted off) 55'; Farhan Roslan (substituted on) 55'; Baddrol Bakhtiar (substituted off) 80'; Syafiq Ahmad (substituted on) 80'; Liridon Krasniqi 87'	Report	Taylor Regan (yellow card) 36'; Goran Jerković (substituted off) 39'; Sabri Sahar (substituted on) 39'; Ashmawi Yakin (substituted off) 68'; Nizam Ruslan (substituted on) 68'; Hariri Safii (substituted off) 83'; Rahizi Rasib (substituted on) 83'; Sean Eugene Selvaraj (yellow card) 90+3'	Stadium: Darul Aman Stadium; Attendance: 25,000; Referee: Muhamad Zamzaidi Katimin; Assistant referees: Ismadi Ibrahim; Ahmad Azanor Huslan; Fourth official: Muhamad Izzat Izaini Ali; Man of the Match: Thiago Augusto

===== Semi-finals =====
30 September 2016 First leg	Kedah FA	2 – 1	(Kuala Lumpur) PDRM FA	Alor Setar, Kedah, Malaysia
21:00 UTC+08:00	Thiago Augusto 9' (pen.); Bang Seung-hwan (substituted off) 46'; Syawal Nordin (substituted on) 46'; Ariff Farhan Isa (substituted off) 55'; Azmeer Yusof (substituted on) 55'; Syazwan Zainon (substituted off) 61'; Halim Saari (substituted on) 61'; Liridon Krasniqi 81' (pen.)	Report	De Paula 12' (pen.); K. Reuben (yellow card) 32'; Eskandar Ismail (yellow card) 68'; Christopher Keli (substituted off) 71'; Syahmi Shakir Salim (substituted on) 71'; Haziq Nadzli (yellow card) 79'; Fakrul Aiman Sidid (substituted off) 85'; Afzal Nazri (substituted on) 85'	Stadium: Darul Aman Stadium; Attendance: 25,000; Referee: Zulkifli Ahmad; Assistant referees: Nojey Naking; Mohammad Zairul Khalil Tan; Fourth official: Mohd Fairuzi Mat Desa; Goal-line assistants: Shaharudin Man. Ahmad Tajuddin Mohd Yusoff. Man of the Match: Liridon

15 October 2016 Second leg	PDRM FA (Kuala Lumpur)	0 – 0 (1 – 2 agg.)	Kedah FA	Krubong, Melaka, Malaysia
21:00 UTC+08:00	Amir Saiful Badeli (yellow card) 30' (substituted off) 84'; Abdul Latiff Suhaimi (yellow card) 71'; Souleymane Konaté (yellow card) 78'; Christopher Keli (substituted off) 79'; Afzal Nazri (substituted on) 79'; Khairul Izuan Abdullah (substituted on) 84'		Baddrol (substituted off) 77'; M. Syazwan (substituted on) 77'; Smeltz (substituted off) 87'; Farhan (substituted on) 87'	Stadium: Hang Jebat Stadium; Attendance: 7,000; Referee: Muhammad Nazmi Nasarudin; Assistant referees: Mohd Khalid Mohd Aris; Asmadi Noor Hasni; Fourth official: Mohd Zohri Tajuddin; Goal-line assistants: Teoh Hee Loon. Kamal Ahmad. Man of the Match: Liridon

===== Final =====
30 October 2016 Final	Kedah FA	1 – 1 (a.e.t.) (6–5 p)	Selangor FA	Shah Alam, Selangor, Malaysia
21:00 UTC+08:00	Syawal (substituted off) 31'; Khairul Helmi (substituted on) 31'; Rizal 52'; T. Augusto (substituted off) 69'; Halim (substituted on) 69'; M. Syazwan (substituted off) 109'; Farhan (substituted on) 109'	Report	Hazwan (yellow card) 12', (goal) 59', (substituted off) 95'; Saiful (substituted off) 59'; Hafiz (substituted on) 59'; Bunyamin (substituted off) 74'; Razman (substituted on) 74'; Olivi (substituted on) 95'	Stadium: Shah Alam Stadium; Referee: Mohd Amirul Izwan Yacob; Assistant referees: Mohd Kamil Tumin; Mohd Noor Abd Rahman; Fourth official: Syed Azhar Syed Kamar; Goal-line assistants: Zulkarnain Zakaria. Ahmad Tajuddin Mohd Yusoff. Man of the Match: Rizal
	Penalties
	Smeltz (penalty missed); Bang (penalty scored); Farhan (penalty scored); Liridon (penalty scored); Baddrol (penalty scored); Amirul (penalty missed); Halim (penalty scored); Rizal (penalty scored)		(penalty scored) Ukah; (penalty scored) Wleh; (penalty missed) Azmi; (penalty scored) Olivi; (penalty scored) Veenod; (penalty missed) Hafiz; (penalty scored) Andik; (penalty missed) Rizal Fahmi

== Statistics ==
=== Squad statistics ===
As of matches played on 30 October 2016.

N	Pos	Nat.	Player	Super League		FA Cup		Malaysia Cup		Total	
N	Pos	Nat.	Player	Apps	Goals	Apps	Goals	Apps	Goals	Apps	Goals
1	GK	(Malaysia)	Hadi Hamid	1	–	–	–	–	–	1	–
2	DF	(Malaysia)	Sabre Abu	2	–	–	–	1	–	3	–
3	DF	(Malaysia)	Syawal Nordin	2	–	–	–	6	–	8	–
4	DF	(South Korea)	Bang Seung-Hwan	20	1	6	1	9	1	35	3
5	DF	(Malaysia)	Osman Yusof	3	–	1	–	2	–	6	–
6	DF	(Malaysia)	Shafizan Hashim	1	–	–	–	2	–	3	–
7	MF	(Malaysia)	Baddrol Bakhtiar	19	3	5	1	10	2	34	6
8	MF	(Kosovo)	Liridon Krasniqi	20	5	5	–	11	5	36	10
—	FW	(Brazil)	Carlos Kahê	12	4	6	4	–	–	18	8
9	FW	(Brazil)	Thiago Augusto	7	4	–	–	9	5	16	9
10	MF	(Brazil)	Sandro Mendonça	7	1	5	2	–	–	12	3
11	DF	(Malaysia)	Raphi Azizan	–	–	–	–	–	–	–	–
12	MF	(Malaysia)	Amar Rohidan	5	–	2	–	–	–	7	–
13	DF	(Malaysia)	Khairul Helmi Johari	17	–	4	1	9	–	30	1
—	FW	(Malaysia)	Fakri Saarani	10	1	6	1	–	–	16	2
14	FW	(New Zealand)	Shane Smeltz	9	6	–	–	11	5	20	11
15	DF	(Malaysia)	Rizal Ghazali	18	–	4	–	11	1	33	1
16	MF	(Malaysia)	Amirul Hisyam	19	–	5	1	9	–	33	1
17	DF	(Malaysia)	Syazwan Tajuddin	6	–	4	–	–	–	10	–
18	MF	(Malaysia)	Halim Saari	11	1	2	–	5	–	18	1
19	MF	(Malaysia)	Farhan Roslan	17	1	5	1	10	–	32	2
20	FW	(Malaysia)	Syafiq Ahmad	19	1	5	–	5	–	29	1
21	GK	(Malaysia)	Syazwan Abdullah	–	–	–	–	–	–	–	–
22	MF	(Malaysia)	Syazwan Zainon	17	1	3	2	11	1	31	4
23	MF	(Malaysia)	Hanif Mat Dzahir	7	–	–	–	2	–	9	–
24	DF	(Malaysia)	Alif Fadhil	–	–	–	–	–	–	–	–
25	DF	(Malaysia)	Azmeer Yusof	20	–	6	1	8	–	34	1
26	MF	(Malaysia)	Shazuan Ashraf	1	–	–	–	1	–	2	–
27	DF	(Malaysia)	Ariff Farhan	14	–	2	–	6	–	22	–
28	DF	(Malaysia)	Asri Mardzuki	1	–	–	–	–	–	1	–
29	MF	(Malaysia)	Syazuan Hazani	–	–	–	–	–	–	–	–
30	GK	(Malaysia)	Farhan Abu Bakar	14	–	6	–	1	–	21	–
31	GK	(Malaysia)	Ifwat Akmal	7	–	–	–	10	–	17	–

=== Goalscorers ===
As of matches played on 30 October 2016.

Rank	Player	Position	Super League	FA Cup	Malaysia Cup	Total
1	(New Zealand) Shane Smeltz	FW	6	–	5	11
2	(Kosovo) Liridon Krasniqi	MF	5	–	5	10
3	(Brazil) Thiago Augusto	FW	4	–	5	9
4	(Brazil) Carlos Kahê	FW	4	4	–	8
5	(Malaysia) Baddrol Bakhtiar	MF	3	1	2	6
6	(Malaysia) Syazwan Zainon	MF	1	2	1	4
7	(South Korea) Bang Seung-hwan	DF	1	1	1	3
7	(Brazil) Sandro Mendonça	MF	1	2	–	3
8	(Malaysia) Fakri Saarani	FW	1	1	–	2
8	(Malaysia) Farhan Roslan	MF	1	1	–	2
9	(Malaysia) Khairul Helmi	DF	–	1	–	1
9	(Malaysia) Rizal Ghazali	DF	–	–	1	1
9	(Malaysia) Amirul Hisyam	MF	–	1	–	1
9	(Malaysia) Halim Saari	MF	1	–	–	1
9	(Malaysia) Syafiq Ahmad	FW	1	–	–	1
9	(Malaysia) Azmeer Yusof	DF	–	1	–	1
Total			29	15	20	64

=== Clean sheets ===
As of matches played on 21 October 2016.

Rank	N	Player	Super League	FA Cup	Malaysia Cup	Total
1	31	(Malaysia) Ifwat Akmal	4	–	6	10
2	30	(Malaysia) Farhan Abu Bakar	3	1	–	4
3	1	(Malaysia) Hadi Hamid	1	–	–	1

=== Disciplinary record ===
N	P	Nat.	Name	Super League			FA Cup			Malaysia Cup			Total			Notes
N	P	Nat.	Name	Yellow card	Second yellow card	Red card	Yellow card	Second yellow card	Red card	Yellow card	Second yellow card	Red card	Yellow card	Second yellow card	Red card	Notes
3	DF	(Malaysia)	Syawal Nordin							1			1			
4	DF	(South Korea)	Bang Seung-hwan	3			1			1			5			
7	MF	(Malaysia)	Baddrol Bakhtiar	4			1			1			6			
8	MF	(Kosovo)	Liridon Krasniqi	2	1		2						4	1		
9	FW	(Brazil)	Carlos Kahê	1									1			
10	MF	(Brazil)	Sandro Mendonça	1									1			
12	MF	(Malaysia)	Amar Rohidan				1						1			
13	DF	(Malaysia)	Khairul Helmi Johari	1			1						2			
14	FW	(New Zealand)	Shane Smeltz							2			2			
15	DF	(Malaysia)	Rizal Ghazali	3									3			
16	MF	(Malaysia)	Amirul Hisyam				2			1			3			
17	DF	(Malaysia)	Syazwan Tajuddin	2									2			
19	MF	(Malaysia)	Farhan Roslan	2			1			2			5			
22	MF	(Malaysia)	Syazwan Zainon							1			1			
25	DF	(Malaysia)	Azmeer Yusof	3			1			2			6			
27	DF	(Malaysia)	Ariff Farhan	2						1			3			

Last updated: 30 October 2016
Source: Matches
Only competitive matches
(yellow card) = Number of bookings; (second yellow card) = Number of sending offs after a second yellow card; (red card) = Number of sending offs by a direct red card.

=== Suspensions ===
A player is automatically suspended for the next match for the following offences:

- Receiving a red card (red card suspensions may be extended for serious offences)
- Receiving two yellow cards in two different matches (FA Cup, Malaysia Cup knockout phase)
- Receiving three yellow cards in three different matches (Super League, Malaysia Cup group stage)

Player	Offence(s)	Suspension(s)
(Kosovo) Liridon Krasniqi	(yellow card) in FA Cup quarter-finals vs Sabah FA (second leg; 1 April 2016); (yellow card) in FA Cup semi-finals vs Johor Darul Ta'zim F.C. (first leg; 16 April 2016)	FA Cup semi-finals vs Johor Darul Ta'zim F.C. (second leg; 30 April 2016)
(Kosovo) Liridon Krasniqi	(yellow card) (yellow-red card) in Super League vs Penang FA (A) (matchday 16; 26 July 2016)	Super League vs Pahang F.C. (H) (matchday 13; 3 August 2016)
(Malaysia) Amirul Hisyam	(yellow card) in FA Cup quarter-finals vs Sabah FA (first leg; 18 March 2016); (yellow card) in FA Cup semi-finals vs Johor Darul Ta'zim F.C. (first leg; 16 April 2016)	FA Cup semi-finals vs Johor Darul Ta'zim F.C. (second leg; 30 April 2016)
(Malaysia) Baddrol Bakhtiar	(yellow card) in Super League vs Perak FA (A) (matchday 3; 27 February 2016); (yellow card) in Super League vs Penang FA (H) (matchday 7; 9 April 2016); (yellow card) in Super League vs Johor Darul Ta'zim F.C. (A) (matchday 14; 16 July 2016)	Super League vs T–Team F.C. (H) (matchday 15; 23 July 2016)
(Malaysia) Rizal Ghazali	(yellow card) in Super League vs Felda United F.C. (A) (matchday 1; 13 February 2016); (yellow card) in Super League vs PDRM FA (A) (matchday 12; 21 May 2016); (yellow card) in Super League vs Penang FA (A) (matchday 16; 26 July 2016)	Super League vs Selangor FA (H) (matchday 17; 6 August 2016)
(South Korea) Bang Seung-hwan	(yellow card) in Super League vs PDRM FA (A) (matchday 12; 21 May 2016); (yellow card) in Super League vs Pahang F.C. (H) (matchday 13; 3 August 2016); (yellow card) in Super League vs Sarawak FA (H) (matchday 18; 16 August 2016)	Super League vs Kelantan FA (A) (matchday 19; 24 August 2016)
(Malaysia) Azmeer Yusof	(yellow card) in Super League vs Terengganu FA (H) (matchday 1; 13 February 2016); (yellow card) in Super League vs Perak FA (A) (matchday 3; 27 February 2016); (yellow card) in Super League vs Kelantan FA (A) (matchday 19; 24 August 2016)	Super League vs Perak FA (H) (matchday 20; 10 September 2016)

As of matches played on 24 August 2016.

=== Summary ===
Games played	39 (22 Super League) (6 FA Cup) (11 Malaysia Cup)
Games won	22 (11 Super League) (4 FA Cup) (7 Malaysia Cup)
Games drawn	11 (7 Super League) (1 FA Cup) (3 Malaysia Cup)
Games lost	6 (4 Super League) (1 FA Cup) (1 Malaysia Cup)
Goals scored	64 (29 Super League) (15 FA Cup) (20 Malaysia Cup)
Goals conceded	41 (26 Super League) (7 FA Cup) (8 Malaysia Cup)
Goal difference	24 (4 Super League) (8 FA Cup) (12 Malaysia Cup)
Clean sheets	15 (8 Super League) (1 FA Cup) (6 Malaysia Cup)
Yellow cards	47 (25 Super League) (10 FA Cup) (12 Malaysia Cup)
Red cards	1 (1 Super League)
Most appearances	36 (Liridon Krasniqi)
Top scorer	11 (Shane Smeltz)
Winning percentage	Overall: 22/39 (56.41%)

As of matches played on 30 October 2016.

=== Home attendance ===
==== Matches (all competitions) ====
All matches played at Darul Aman Stadium.

Date	Attendance	Opposition	Score	Competition	Ref.
16 February 2016	17,000	Terengganu FA	1–0	Super League matchday 2	
19 February 2016	6,000	(Selangor) Megah Murni FC	8–0	FA Cup round of 32	
1 March 2016	16,500	Kelantan FA	2–1	Super League matchday 4	
4 March 2016	17,500	Kelantan FA	1–1 (a.e.t.) (5–4 p)	FA Cup round of 16	
1 April 2016	24,500	Sabah FA	1–1	FA Cup quarter-finals 2	
9 April 2016	8,400	Penang FA	2–2	Super League matchday 7	
16 April 2016	23,400	Johor Darul Ta'zim FC	2–1	FA Cup semi-finals 1	
23 April 2016	8,763	Johor Darul Ta'zim FC	1–1	Super League matchday 9	
18 May 2016	3,338	(Malaysia) PDRM FA	2–0	Super League matchday 11	
13 July 2016	17,000	Sarawak FA	4–3	Malaysia Cup group stage matchday 1	
23 July 2016	5,450	(Terengganu) T–Team FC	1–0	Super League matchday 15	
29 July 2016	14,000	Johor Darul Ta'zim II FC	0–0	Malaysia Cup group stage matchday 3	
3 August 2016	7,836	Pahang FC	1–0	Super League matchday 13	
6 August 2016	10,064	Selangor FA	1–0	Super League matchday 17	
13 August 2016	9,683	(Terengganu) T–Team FC	0–1	Malaysia Cup group stage matchday 5	
16 August 2016	6,270	Sarawak FA	2–1	Super League matchday 18	
10 September 2016	16,500	Perak FA	3–1	Super League matchday 20	
17 September 2016	25,000	Negeri Sembilan FA	5–0	Malaysia Cup quarter-finals 2	
30 September 2016	25,000	(Malaysia) PDRM FA	2–1	Malaysia Cup semi-finals 1	
21 October 2016	3,300	(Kuala Lumpur) Felda United FC	1–0	Super League matchday 22	

Matches designated as Home Team, but not played at Darul Aman Stadium.

Date	Venue	Attendance	Opposition	Score	Competition	Ref.
30 October 2016	Shah Alam Stadium	79,782	Selangor FA	1–1 (a.e.t.) (6–5 p)	Malaysia Cup Final	

==== Attendance (each competitions) ====
Competitions	Matches	Total attendance	Average attendance
Super League	11	103,421	9,402
FA Cup	4	71,400	17,850
Malaysia Cup	5	90,683	18,137
Total	20	265,504	13,275

== Awards ==
=== Monthly awards ===
For the 2016 season, sponsors collaboration with Kedah FA in recognizing the contributions of players throughout the season. Every month one player will be selected as the player of the month based on the current performance. Selection is based on the feedback of fans and squad management. Winners will be announced at 8:00pm at Darul Aman Stadium. The winner will take home a plaque and a cash prize of RM500 contribution from the sponsors. (Cola Kedah – February, March & April) (Gold Perfume Factory – August & September)

Month	Player of the Month	Event date
February	(Malaysia) Amirul Hisyam	4 March 2016
March	(Kosovo) Liridon Krasniqi	1 April 2016
April	(Malaysia) Rizal Ghazali	18 May 2016
August	(Malaysia) Baddrol Bakhtiar	17 September 2016
September	(Brazil) Thiago Augusto	30 September 2016

=== Season awards ===
Kedah FA will inaugurate a player who was most prominent during the year based on fan votes. Kedah FA media will publish reviews and player statistics throughout the year in form of articles before voting is open to the fans after the last game for the team. The nominees was agreed by Head Coach, Tan Cheng Hoe and technical staff. Winners will be announced on Monday, 31 October from 8pm until 10pm at Istana Negara, Jalan Duta.
Winners are listed first, highlighted in boldface, and indicated with a double dagger (‡).

**Player of the Year**
- **Baddrol Bakhtiar – (7,303 votes)**‡
  - Liridon Krasniqi – (2,379 votes)
  - Syazwan Zainon – (751 votes)
  - Shane Smeltz – (150 votes)
  - Khairul Helmi Johari – (140 votes)

**Young Player of the Year**
- **Mohd Ifwat Akmal Che Kassim – (4,862 votes)**‡
  - Amirul Hisyam Awang Kechik – (1,252 votes)
  - Farhan Roslan – (540 votes)
  - Syafiq Ahmad – (186 votes)
  - Ariff Farhan Isa – (50 votes)

**Goal of the Year**
- **Liridon Krasniqi (free kick) vs Negeri Sembilan on 17 September – (3,492 votes)**‡
  - Baddrol Bakhtiar (chip goal) vs Kelantan on 24 August – (1,067 votes)
  - Shane Smeltz (half volley) vs T–Team on 23 July – (222 votes)
  - Thiago Augusto (solo run goal) vs Terengganu on 24 September – (91 votes)
  - Shane Smeltz (header) vs Johor Darul Ta'zim II on 9 October – (22 votes)

=== National awards ===
The Football Association of Malaysia National Football Awards are presented to the best football local and foreign players and coaches.

Year	Nominee / work	Award	Result
2016	(Malaysia) Syafiq Ahmad	Best Striker	Nominated
2016	(Malaysia) Baddrol Bakhtiar	Best Midfielder	Nominated
2016	(Malaysia) Syazwan Zainon	Best Midfielder	Nominated
2016	(Malaysia) Rizal Ghazali	Best Defender Award	Won
2016	(Malaysia) Tan Cheng Hoe	Best Coach	Won
2016	(Kosovo) Liridon Krasniqi	Best Foreign Players	Nominated
2016	(Malaysia) Amirul Hisyam	Best Young Players	Nominated
2016	(Malaysia) Farhan Roslan	Best Young Players	Nominated
2016	(Malaysia) Syafiq Ahmad	Best Young Players	Nominated
2016	(Malaysia) Kedah FA	Best Social Media	Nominated
2016	(Malaysia) Tan Cheng Hoe	The Best XI – Coach (fan vote)	Won
2016	(Malaysia) Rizal Ghazali	The Best XI – Left Defender (fan vote)	Won
2016	(Kosovo) Liridon Krasniqi	The Best XI – Midfielder (fan vote)	Won
2016	(Malaysia) Amirul Hisyam	The Best XI – Left Winger (fan vote)	Won
2016	(Kosovo) Liridon Krasniqi	Most Popular Player (fan vote)	Won
