= 2016 Malaysia FA Cup =

Superbest Power Piala FA

Tournament details
- Country: Malaysia
- Dates: 30 January 2016 – 14 May 2016
- Teams: 35

Final positions
- Champions: Johor Darul Ta'zim (1st title)
- Runners-up: PKNS

The 2016 Malaysia FA Cup was the 27th season of the Malaysia FA Cup, a knockout competition for Malaysia's state football association and clubs. It was sponsored by Kopi Superbest Power (Superbest Power Coffee), and was known as the Superbest Power Piala FA due to sponsorship purposes. LionsXII were the defending champions after beating Kelantan 3–1 in the previous season, but did not compete in this edition.

35 teams entered this years competition. Six teams entered in the first stage with three clubs making the Second Round. The draw for the competition was made on 9 January 2016. The winners were assured a place in the 2017 AFC Cup.

== Round and draw dates ==
Round	Draw date	First leg	Second leg
First Round	9 January 2016	30 January and 2 February 2016	
Second Round	9 January 2016	19 and 20 February 2016	
Third Round	20 February 2016, 23:45 UTC+8	4 and 5 March 2016	
Quarter-finals	6 March 2016, 09:30 UTC+8	18 and 19 March 2016	1 April and 2 April 2016
Semi-final	6 March 2016, 09:30 UTC+8	15 and 16 April 2016	30 April 2016
Final	6 March 2016, 09:30 UTC+8	14 May 2016	

== Matches ==
Key: (1) = Super League; (2) = Premier League; (3) = FAM League

=== First Round ===
2 February 2016	Megah Murni (3) (Selangor)	1–0 (a.e.t.)	(Malaysia) MISC-MIFA (3)	Selayang
21:00 (UTC+8)				Stadium: Selayang Stadium

30 January 2016	UKM (3) (Kuala Lumpur)	1–1 (a.e.t.) (5–4 p)	(Terengganu) Hanelang (3)	Bangi
16:15 (UTC+8)				Stadium: UKM Mini Stadium

30 January 2016	FELCRA (3) (Kuala Lumpur)	2–1 (a.e.t.)	(Negeri Sembilan) Penjara (3)	Selayang
21:00 (UTC+8)				Stadium: Selayang Stadium

=== Second Round ===
19 February 2016	DRB-HICOM (2) (Kuala Lumpur)	1–2 (a.e.t.)	PDRM (1)	Tanjung Malim, Perak
16:15 (UTC+8)	Babić 8'	Report	Keli 20'; Antwi 105' (o.g.)	Stadium: Proton Mini Stadium; Attendance: 500; Referee: S.Logeswaran

19 February 2016	Perlis (2)	1–0	(Kuala Lumpur) FELCRA (3)	Kangar, Perlis
16:15 (UTC+8)	Vincent 71'	Report		Stadium: Tuanku Syed Putra Stadium; Attendance: 7,000; Referee: Mohd Afzanizam Mamat

19 February 2016	UiTM (2) (Selangor)	0–5	Johor Darul Ta'zim (1)	Shah Alam
16:15 (UTC+8)		Report	Amri Yahyah 13'; Chanturu 32', 36'; Amirul 45'; Díaz 71'	Stadium: UiTM Stadium; Attendance: 2,900; Referee: Khairul Rizal Ismail

19 February 2016	Kedah (1)	8–0	(Selangor) Megah Murni (3)	Alor Setar
21:00 (UTC+8)	Azmeer 6'; Sandro 10'; Syazwan 25', 38'; Amirul Hisyam 28'; Kahê 36', 89', 90+2'			Stadium: Darul Aman Stadium

19 February 2016	AirAsia Allstar (3) (Selangor)	0–2	Selangor (1)	Seremban
21:00 (UTC+8)			Ronaldinho 69'; Hadi 77'	Stadium: Tuanku Abdul Rahman Stadium

19 February 2016	PKNS (2) (Selangor)	3–1	Terengganu (1)	Melaka City
21:00 (UTC+8)	Jadue 47'; Soto 74'; Guerra 90+4' (pen.)		Fakhrurazi 60'	Stadium: Hang Jebat Stadium

19 February 2016	Pahang (1)	2–1 (a.e.t.)	(Terengganu) T–Team (1)	Kuantan
21:00 (UTC+8)	German Pacheco 45'; Volaš 111'		Safawi 8'	Stadium: Darul Makmur Stadium

19 February 2016	Sime Darby (2) (Kuala Lumpur)	2–0	Johor Darul Ta'zim II (2)	Selayang
21:00 (UTC+8)	Nazrul 26'; Shazlan 54'	Report		Stadium: Selayang Stadium; Attendance: 770; Referee: Muhammad Nazmi Nasaruddin

20 February 2016	Sungai Ara (3) (Penang)	0–2	Negeri Sembilan (2)	Gelugor
16:15 (UTC+8)			Chianese 65'; Ting 69'	Stadium: USM Mini Stadium

20 February 2016	Sabah (2)	3–0	(Kuala Lumpur) MOF (3)	Kota Kinabalu
20:15 (UTC+8)	Nnake 5', 46'; Mazsius 81'			Stadium: Likas Stadium

20 February 2016	FELDA United (1) (Kuala Lumpur)	2–0	(Perak) Ipoh (3)	Jengka
21:00 (UTC+8)	Doe 41'; Norfazly 90+2'			Stadium: Tun Abdul Razak Stadium

20 February 2016	Kuala Lumpur (2)	1–1 (a.e.t.) (4–2 p)	(Malacca) Melaka United (2)	Selayang
21:00 (UTC+8)	Casagrande 4'		Jasmir 87'	Stadium: Selayang Stadium
	Penalties
	(penalty scored) Moreira; (penalty scored) Thamil; (penalty scored) Hafiz; (penalty scored) Azlan		(penalty scored) Božović; (penalty missed) Nurshamil; (penalty missed) Shin; (penalty scored) Fiqri

20 February 2016	Perak (1)	3–1 (a.e.t.)	Sarawak (1)	Ipoh
21:00 (UTC+8)	Tiago 84'; Firdaus 91'; Beto 119'		Partiban 17'	Stadium: Perak Stadium

20 February 2016	Kuantan (2) (Pahang)	4–2 (a.e.t.)	Penang (1)	George Town
21:00 (UTC+8)	Bakary 90', 113'; Nakatake 105'; Malik 109'		Córdoba 80', 110'	Stadium: Stadium Bandar Raya

20 February 2016	Shahzan Muda (3) (Pahang)	2–3 (a.e.t.)	ATM (2)	Kuantan
21:00 (UTC+8)	Razren 49'; Baqiuddin 117'		Tauffik 39'; Faiz 98', 115'	Stadium: Darul Makmur Stadium

20 February 2016	Kelantan (1)	1–0	(Kuala Lumpur) UKM (3)	Kota Bharu
21:00 (UTC+8)	Ilojoski 83'			Stadium: Sultan Mohammad IV Stadium

=== Third Round ===
4 March 2016	PDRM (1)	2–1	Selangor (1)	Malacca City
21:00 (UTC+8)	Nizam 38'; Safuwan 58'		Wleh 86'	Stadium: Hang Jebat Stadium

4 March 2016	Johor Darul Ta'zim (1)	4–1	Negeri Sembilan (2)	Johor Bahru
21:00 (UTC+8)	Azniee 5'; Amri 10' (pen.); Díaz 63', 90+1'		Nabbout 66'	Stadium: Tan Sri Dato Haji Hassan Yunos Stadium

4 March 2016	Kedah (1)	1–1 (a.e.t.) (5–4 p)	Kelantan (1)	Alor Setar
21:00 (UTC+8)				Stadium: Darul Aman Stadium

5 March 2016	Perak (1)	1–0	(Pahang) Kuantan (2)	Ipoh
21:00 (UTC+8)	Shodiev 3'			Stadium: Perak Stadium

5 March 2016	Perlis (2)	0–2	Kuala Lumpur (2)	Kangar
21:00 (UTC+8)			Fahrul Razi 20'; Hafiz 25'	Stadium: Tuanku Syed Putra Stadium

5 March 2016	PKNS (2) (Selangor)	3–2	(Kuala Lumpur) FELDA United (1)	Malacca City
21:00 (UTC+8)				Stadium: Hang Jebat Stadium

5 March 2016	Sabah (2)	2–1	ATM (2)	Kota Kinabalu
20:15 (UTC+8)				Stadium: Likas Stadium

5 March 2016	Pahang (1)	0–1	(Kuala Lumpur) Sime Darby (2)	Kuantan
21:00 (UTC+8)			Syed 5'	Stadium: Darul Makmur Stadium

=== Quarter-final ===
Team 1	Agg.	Team 2	1st leg	2nd leg
Sabah (2)	2–3	Kedah (1)	1–2	1–1
PDRM (1)	2–6	Johor Darul Ta'zim (1)	0–1	2–5
Sime Darby (2) (Kuala Lumpur)	2–7	(Selangor) PKNS (2)	0–4	2–3
Perak (1)	2–0	Kuala Lumpur (2)	1–0	1–0

==== First leg ====
18 March 2016	Sabah (2)	1–2	Kedah (1)	Kota Kinabalu
21:00 (UTC+8)	Cerina 90+4'	Report	Seung-Hwan 39'; Baddrol 69'	Stadium: Likas Stadium; Attendance: 10,000; Referee: Mohd Amirul Izwan Yaacob

19 March 2016	PDRM (1)	0–1	Johor Darul Ta'zim (1)	Malacca City
21:00 (UTC+8)		Report	Lucero 18' (pen.)	Stadium: Hang Jebat Stadium; Attendance: 12,000; Referee: Mohd Zohri Tajuddin

19 March 2016	Sime Darby (2) (Kuala Lumpur)	0–4	(Selangor) PKNS (2)	Selayang
21:00 (UTC+8)		Report	Jadue 19'; Cobelli 54', 79'; Nazrin 84'	Stadium: Selayang Stadium; Attendance: 334; Referee: Mohamad Nazmi Nasaruddin

19 March 2016	Perak (1)	1–0	Kuala Lumpur (2)	Ipoh
21:00 (UTC+8)	Helmi 7' (o.g.)	Report		Stadium: Perak Stadium; Attendance: 7,800; Referee: Mohammad Zamzaidi Katimin

==== Second leg ====
1 April 2016	Kedah (1)	1–1	Sabah (2)	Alor Setar
21:00 (UTC+8)	Kahê 23'	Report	Ummareng 59'	Stadium: Darul Aman Stadium; Attendance: 24,500; Referee: Mohd Fairuzi Mat Desa

2 April 2016	Johor Darul Ta'zim (1)	5–2	PDRM (1)	Johor Bahru
21:00 (UTC+8)	Díaz 16', 28'; Safiq 41' (pen.); Azniee 43'; Lucero 66'	Report	Andrezinho 49'; Nizam 63'	Stadium: Larkin Stadium; Attendance: 22,680; Referee: Zulkifli Ahmad

1 April 2016	PKNS (2) (Selangor)	3–2	(Kuala Lumpur) Sime Darby (2)	Malacca City
21:00 (UTC+8)	Cobelli 12', 65'; Shakir 17'	Report	Kil-hoon 19'; Pooda 80'	Stadium: Hang Jebat Stadium; Attendance: 29; Referee: Khairul Azuan Kidam

1 April 2016	Kuala Lumpur (2)	0–1	Perak (1)	Selayang
21:00 (UTC+8)		Report	Nurridzuan 41'	Stadium: Selayang Stadium; Attendance: 6,200; Referee: Saiful Md Radzali

=== Semi-final ===
Team 1	Agg.	Team 2	1st leg	2nd leg
Kedah (1)	3–4	Johor Darul Ta'zim (1)	2–1	1–3
PKNS (2) (Selangor)	4–3	Perak (1)	2–2	2–1

==== First leg ====
16 April 2016	Kedah (1)	2–1	Johor Darul Ta'zim (1)	Alor Setar
21:00 (UTC+8)	Farhan 15'; Sandro 45'	Report	Lucero 27'	Stadium: Darul Aman Stadium; Attendance: 23,400; Referee: Sittharanjanan

15 April 2016	PKNS (2) (Selangor)	2–2	Perak (2)	Malacca City
21:00 (UTC+8)	Guerra 48', 71'	Report	Nurridzuan 58'; Thiago 90+3'	Stadium: Hang Jebat Stadium; Attendance: 1,088; Referee: Khirulazuan Kidam

==== Second leg ====
30 April 2016	Johor Darul Ta'zim (1)	3–1	Kedah (1)	Johor Bahru
21:00 (UTC+8)				Stadium: Larkin Stadium; Attendance: 25,200

30 April 2016	Perak (2)	1–2	(Selangor) PKNS (2)	Ipoh
21:00 (UTC+8)				Stadium: Perak Stadium; Attendance: 40,523

=== Final ===
The final was played on 14 May 2016 at Shah Alam Stadium.

14 May 2016
21:00 (UTC+8)

Johor Darul Ta'zim (1)	2–1	(Selangor) PKNS (2)
Safiq 16' (pen.); Díaz 36'	Report	Guerra 6' (pen.)

Shah Alam Stadium, Shah Alam
Attendance: 75,000
Referee: Syed Azhar Syed Kamar

== Champions ==
Champions
Johor Darul Ta'zim
1st Title

== Broadcasting rights ==
These matches were covered live on Malaysia television:

Round	Media Prima	RTM	Other
First round	None	None	None
Second Round	Kuala Lumpur v Melaka United (TV9)	None	Kuala Lumpur v Melaka United (Win Sports)
Third Round	Kedah v Kelantan (TV9)	None	Kedah v Kelantan (Teletica)
Quarter-final (1st leg)	Perak v Kuala Lumpur (TV9)	PDRM v Johor Darul Ta'zim (TV1)	PDRM v Johor Darul Ta'zim (TVN); Perak v Kuala Lumpur (Teletica/Win Sports)
Quarter-final (2nd leg)	Johor Darul Ta'zim v PDRM (TV9)	Kuala Lumpur v Perak (TV2)	Johor Darul Ta'zim v PDRM (Teletica/Televisa/Win Sports/ZDF)
Semi-final (1st leg)	PKNS v Perak (TV9); Kedah v Johor Darul Ta'zim (TV9)	None	PKNS v Perak (Teletica/Televisa/Win Sports/ZDF); Kedah v Johor Darul Ta'zim (Teletica/Televisa/Win Sports/ZDF)
Semi-final (2nd leg)	Perak v PKNS (TV9); Johor Darul Ta'zim v Kedah (TV3)	None	Perak v PKNS (Teletica/Televisa/Win Sports/ZDF); Johor Darul Ta'zim v Kedah (Caracol Televisión/Channel 3)
Final	Johor Darul Ta'zim v PKNS (TV3)	None	Johor Darul Ta'zim v PKNS (Caracol Televisión/Channel 3)
