= 2019 Malaysia FA Cup final =

- The match programme cover
- Event: 2019 Malaysia FA Cup
Perak	Kedah
0	1
- After extra time
- Date: 27 July 2019
- Venue: Bukit Jalil National Stadium, Kuala Lumpur
- Man of the Match: Ifwat Akmal (Kedah)
- Referee: Takuto Okabe (Japan)
- Attendance: 83,520

The 2019 Malaysia FA Cup final was the 30th final of the Malaysia FA Cup, the Malaysia football cup competition.

== Background ==
The final was played on 27 July 2019 at Bukit Jalil National Stadium.

== Route to the final ==
Note: In all results below, the score of the finalist is given first.

=== Perak ===
Round	Opposition	Score
First Round	Bye	
Second Round	Negeri Sembilan (h)	2–1
Third Round	Jerantut (a)	2–1
Quarter-finals	PKNP (1st leg) (a)	0–0
Quarter-finals	PKNP (2nd leg) (h)	2–1
Semi-final	Pahang (1st leg) (a)	1–3
Semi-final	Pahang (2nd leg) (h)	3–0
Key: (h) = Home venue; (a) = Away venue.

=== Kedah ===
Round	Opposition	Score
First Round	Bye	
Second Round	Selangor United (h)	3–2 (a.e.t.)
Third Round	PJ City (h)	2–0
Quarter-finals	PKNS (1st leg) (h)	3–1
Quarter-finals	PKNS (2nd leg) (a)	1–1
Semi-final	Felda United (1st leg) (h)	1–0
Semi-final	Felda United (2nd leg) (a)	2–3
Key: (h) = Home venue; (a) = Away venue.

== Ticket allocation ==
Each club received an allocation of 80,000 tickets; 30,750 tickets for Perak, 30,750 tickets for Kedah and 18,500 tickets for online purchase.

== Rules ==
The final are played as a single match. If tied after regulation, extra time and, if necessary, penalty shoot-out would be used to decide the winner.

== Match ==
=== Details ===
27 July 2018
21:00 (UTC+8)

Perak	0–1 (a.e.t.)	Kedah
		Fadzrul Danel 105+1'

Bukit Jalil National Stadium, Kuala Lumpur
Attendance: 83,250
Referee: Takuto Okabe (Japan)

Perak	Kedah

GK	22	(Malaysia) Hafizul Hakim
RB	23	(Malaysia) Amirul Azhan	(yellow card) 45' (yellow-red card) 90+4'
CB	3	(Malaysia) Shahrul Saad (c)
CB	5	(Lebanon) Hussein Eldor
LB	21	(Malaysia) Nazirul Naim	(yellow card) 46'	(substituted off) 107'
DM	11	(Malaysia) Brendan Gan
DM	8	(Brazil) Leandro	(yellow card) 27'
RM	16	(Malaysia) Partiban Janasekaran
AM	30	(Brazil) Careca		(substituted off) 105+2'
LM	19	(Malaysia) Nor Hakim Hassan		(substituted off) 91'
CF	9	(Brazil) Ronaldo
Substitutes:
MF	4	(Malaysia) Nasir Basharudin
MF	7	(Malaysia) Khairil Anuar
FW	10	(Malaysia) Shahrel Fikri		(substituted on) 107'
MF	14	(Malaysia) Firdaus Saiyadi		(substituted on) 105+2'
DF	15	(Malaysia) Idris Ahmad		(substituted on) 91'
GK	18	(Malaysia) Khairul Amri
DF	20	(Malaysia) Rafiuddin Roddin
Head Coach:
(Australia) Mehmet Durakovic

GK	18	(Malaysia) Ifwat Akmal
RB	15	(Malaysia) Rizal Ghazali
CB	16	(Malaysia) Amirul Hisyam
CB	11	(Singapore) Shakir Hamzah
LB	28	(Malaysia) Alif Yusof
RM	60	(Kyrgyzstan) Edgar Bernhardt		(substituted off) 87'
CM	7	(Malaysia) Baddrol Bakhtiar (c)	(yellow card) 13'
CM	55	(Malaysia) David Rowley		(substituted off) 105'
LM	29	(Malaysia) Farhan Roslan		(substituted off) 66'
AM	10	(Argentina) Jonatan Bauman	(yellow card) 60'
CF	9	(Spain) Fernando Rodríguez
Substitutes:
GK	1	(Malaysia) Hadi Hamid
DF	3	(Malaysia) Loqman Hakim
MF	4	(Malaysia) Azamuddin Akil		(substituted on) 66'
FW	8	(Malaysia) Zaquan Adha
MF	20	(Malaysia) Fadzrul Danel		(substituted on) 105'
FW	21	(Malaysia) Fayadh Zulkifli		(substituted on) 87'
DF	25	(Malaysia) Azmeer Yusof
Head Coach:
(Singapore) Aidil Sharin Sahak

Man of the Match:
Ifwat Akmal (Kedah)

Match rules

- 90 minutes
- 30 minutes of extra time if necessary
- Penalty shoot-out if scores still level
- Seven named substitutes, of which up to three may be used
