= List of Kedah Darul Aman F.C. honours and achievements =

Kedah Darul Aman has won the Malaysian league championship three times (1993, 2007 & 2008), the Malaysia Cup four times (1990, 1993, 2007 & 2008).

The Malaysian FA Cup is an annual national knock-out football tournament. Kedah won the Malaysian FA Cup three times (1996, 2007 & 2008). This makes Kedah is the first and only football team in Malaysian history to do the treble twice in a row.

== Honours ==
Title	Winners	Runners-up
AFC Champions League		1994 (1st round - Asian Club Championship)
AFC Cup		2008 (Quarter Final)
Malaysia Cup (4x)	1990, 1993, 2007, 2008	1940, 1987, 1988, 1989, 1992, 2004
Division 1/Premier 1/Super League (3x)	1993, 2007, 2008	1994, 1996, 1997, 2003
Division 2/Premier 2/Premier League (4x)	1992, 2002, 2006, 2015	2005 (Group A)
Malaysian FA Cup (3x)	1996, 2007, 2008	2010
Malaysian Charity Shield (2x)	1991, 1994	1997, 2008

== Doubles and Trebles ==
Title	Year	Cups Won
Double (1x)	1993	Malaysia Division 1, Malaysia Cup
Treble (2x)	2007, 2008	Malaysia Super League, Malaysian FA Cup, Malaysia Cup

== Seasonal achievement ==
Season	Position	League	FA Cup	Malaysia Cup
1982	-/16	Malaysian League	No competition	-
1983	4/16	Malaysian League	No competition	Quarter Final
1984	13/16	Malaysian League	No competition	Not Qualified
1985	11/17	Malaysian League	No competition	Not Qualified
1986	7/16	Malaysian League	No competition	Quarter Final
1987	-/16	Malaysian League	No competition	Runner-up
1988	4/17	Malaysian League	No competition	Runner-up
1989	3/9	Division 1	No competition	Runner-up
1990	6/10	Division 1	Quarter Final	Champion
1991	9/10	Division 1	Quarter Final	Not Qualified
1992	Champion	Division 2	2nd round	Runner-up
1993	Champion	Division 1	Quarter Final	Champion
1994	Runner-up	Premier League	Quarter Final	Semi Final
1995	4/15	Premier League	Quarter Final	Group
1996	Runner-up	Premier League	Champion	Group
1997	Runner-up	Premier League	2nd round	Group
1998	4/12	Premier League	Semi Final	Group
1999	10/10	Premier 1	Quarter Final	Not qualified
2000	3/10	Premier 2	Quarter Final	Group
2001	11/12	Premier 2	1st round	Not Qualified
2002	Champion	Premier 2	Semi Final	Semi Final
2003	Runner-up	Premier 1	1st round	Quarter Final
2004	8/8	Super League	1st round	Runner-up
2005	2/8	Premier League (Group A)	2nd round	Quarter Final
2006	Champion	Premier League (Group A)	1st round	Group
2007	Champion	Super League	Champion	Champion
2008	Champion	Super League	Champion	Champion
2009	3/14	Super League	2nd Round	Group
2010	5/14	Super League	Runner-up	Semi Final
2011	4/14	Super League	2nd Round	Group
2012	12/14	Super League	Semi Final	Group
2013		Premier League	2nd Round	

== World Clubs Ranking ==
1 October 2006–29 September 2008

Month	Position	Different
1 Dec 2006–30 Nov 2007	395th	-
1 Jan 2007–31 Dec 2007	346th	+49
1 Feb 2007–31 Jan 2008	285th	+61
1 March 2007 – 29 Feb 2008	288th	-3
1 Apr 2007–31 March 2008	266th	+22
1 May 2007 – 30 Apr 2008	145th	+121
1 June 2007 – 31 May 2008	149th	-4
1 July 2007 – 30 June 2008	163rd	-14
1 August 2007 – 31 July 2008	161th	+2
1 Sept 2007–31 August 2008	160th	+1
1 Oct 2007–29 Sept 2008	157th	+3

Note: Ranking by IFFHS

== See also ==
- List of Kedah Darul Aman F.C. players
