= Ahmad Basri Akil =

Malaysian football manager (1939–2008)

Dato' Paduka Ahmad Basri Mohd. Akil
- Born: 25 April 1939; Alor Setar, Kedah, Malaysia
- Died: 15 July 2008 (aged 69); Alor Setar, Kedah, Malaysia
- Known for: Managing Kedah FA and the Malaysia national football team

Dato' Paduka Haji Ahmad Basri bin Mohd Akil (25 April 1939 – 15 July 2008) was a Malaysian football manager who was the team manager for Kedah FA and for the Malaysia national team.

== Biography ==
Born in Alor Setar, he had 8 children and 11 grandchildren. He managed Kedah Football Team Kedah FA for the first time in 1986. He was considered the 'father' of football development in Kedah. He built the state team to become a force in local football culminating in their winning the Malaysia Cup in 1990 by beating Singapore 3-1 in the final. The former Kedah Football Association (KFA) Vice President was a personality who criticised FAM and was suspended for four years and had to relinquish all posts in the national association and also for any posts KFA (2001–2005). His quest to take the Kedah team to the pinnacle of football success began when he launched a five-year plan (1987–1991) to wrest the Malaysia Cup when he was KFA vice-president. The late Ahmad Basri was also the national team's manager in the 1989 SEA Games when he led the national team for winning SEA Games Gold Medal and Kedah manager from 1986 till 1996 and 2006-2007. He was suspended again by FAM in 2007 for another three years when he criticised FAM again for failing to develop Malaysian football at national level.

He was buried at the Alor Merah Muslim Cemetery.

== Careers ==
=== Kedah Administrative and Kedah Civil Servant ===
- Kedah Cadet Administrative Service (12 January 1959)
- Assistance Land Officer (14 Mei 1959)
- Assistance Baling District Officer (Land) (15 September 1959)
- Assistance Kubang Pasu District Officer (6 January 1962)
- Assistance Langkawi District Officer (1 February 1964)
- Assistance Land and Mineral Commissioner (4 January 1967)
- Secretary of Kedah Menteri Besar (3 May 1969)
- Assistance Kedah State Secretary (Local Government)(5 September 1970)
- Acting Langkawi District Officer (1 January 1971)
- Acting Sungai Petani Municipal Council Chancellor (1 January 1974)
- Deputy Director of Kedah Land and Mineral (9 September 1976)
- Kedah Treasurer (19 March 1977)
- Deputy of Kedah State Secretary (17 December 1978)
- Acting Kedah State Finance Officer (25 September 1980)
- Kuala Muda District Officer (13 June 1982)
- Kota Setar District Officer (1 January 1984)
- Director of Kedah Land and Mineral (1 March 1986)
- Kedah State Finance Officer (3 November 1989)
- Kedah State Secretary (28 August 1992)

=== Football ===
- Manager for Kedah football team (Kedah FA) (1986–1996)
- Malaysia national football team Manager for SEA games (1989)
- Deputy President for Football Association of Malaysia (FAM) (1994–1998)
- Wrote the lyrics for Kedah football anthem - "Biar Jasa Jadi Kenangan"

=== Others ===
- President of Kedah Art's Associates (Angkatan Pelukis Kedah)
- President of Kedah's Malaysian Red Crescent Society (Persatuan Bulan Sabit Merah Malaysia)
- Former President of Kedah Camera Club (Kelab Kamera Kedah-KCC)

== Achievements ==
- 1989 - Managed Malaysia national football team to swoop Gold Medal in SEA games
- 1990 - Managed Kedah for the 1st time to clinch Malaysia Cup title
- 1993 - Managed Kedah to win double of Division 1/Premier 1/Super League and Malaysia Cup
- 1996 - Managed Kedah to sweep the Malaysia FA Cup, the only title of the Malaysian football that Kedah had never won
- Person who idealized the identity of Kedah football with the green and yellow as the tradition colours
- Who creates the current Kedah FA crest and its motto, "Biar Jasa Jadi Kenangan" (Let's Our Contribution Be Remembered)
- Wrote the lyrics for Kedah football anthem - "Biar Jasa Jadi Kenangan"
