= List of Kedah Darul Aman F.C. players =

The following is a list of Kedah Darul Aman FC players, both current and former. The Kedah Darul Aman Football Club is a Malaysian football team.

== List of players ==
- (Malaysia) Redwan Nawi
- (Malaysia) Zamzuri Md Isa
- (Malaysia) Hasmawi Hassan
- (Malaysia) Mohd Bunyamin Umar
- (Malaysia) Zairol Fitree Ishak
- (Malaysia) K. Soley
- (Malaysia) Megat Amir Faisal Al Khalidi Ibrahim
- (Malaysia) Akmal Rizal Ahmad Rakhli
- (Malaysia) Mohd Fauzi Nan
- (Malaysia) Mohd Rafdi Abdul Rashid
- (Malaysia) Shariman Che Omar
- (Malaysia) Liew Kit Kong
- (Malaysia) Ooi Hoe Guan
- (Malaysia) Badrul Afzan Razali
- (Malaysia) Redzuan Mohd Radzy
- (Malaysia) Irwan Fadzli Idrus
- (Malaysia) Danial Fadzly Abdullah
- (Malaysia) Somchat Na Rong
- (Malaysia) Manzoor Azwira Abdul Wahid
- (Malaysia) Zainuddin Mohd Ariffin
- (Malaysia) Amirul Nizam Mahadzir
- (Malaysia) Tan Cheng Hoe
- (Malaysia) Adrien Jurad Chamrong
- (Malaysia) Cheah Kean Seng
- (Malaysia) Roslan Abdul Rahim
- (Malaysia) Mazlan Abdul Wahed
- (Malaysia) G. Shanmugan
- (Malaysia) Che Zambil Ahmad
- (Malaysia) Yap Wai Loon
- (Malaysia) Badulhisham Abdullah
- (Malaysia) Khairul Anuar Baharum
- (Malaysia) S. Ragesh
- (Malaysia) Norizam Ali Hassan
- (Malaysia) Mat Zahir Wahab
- (Malaysia) Che Hisamuddin Hassan
- (Malaysia) Maizal Hairi Marzuki
- (Malaysia) Khattul Anuar Abdul Hamid
- (Malaysia) Anuar Abdul Aziz
- (Malaysia) Yew Choh Hooi
- (Malaysia) Zulfatah Dzulkarnain
- (Malaysia) Ahmad Zalghafari Manaf
- (Malaysia) Amran Omar
- (Malaysia) Azrin Shah Zainal
- (Malaysia) Mohd Shawal Johadi
- (Malaysia) Fakhzan Salleh
- (Malaysia) Khamal Idris Ali
- (Malaysia) Hashim Mustapha
- (Malaysia) Muhamad Radhi Mat Din
- (Malaysia) Manja Man
- (Malaysia) Feriza Ismail
- (Malaysia) Farouk Ismail
- (Malaysia) Lee Thean Ewe
- (Malaysia) Lim Teong Kim
- (Malaysia) S. Thanasegar
- (Malaysia) Lee Kin Hong
- (Malaysia) Mohd Nidzam Adzha Yusoff
- (Malaysia) Faridzuan Che Hamid
- (Malaysia) Jelani Wilastra
- (Malaysia) V. Thinagaran
- (Malaysia) Ahmad Sabri Ismail
- (Malaysia) Azmi Mahmud
- (Malaysia) Ng Chew Beng
- (Malaysia) Chan Keat Swee
- (Malaysia) Mohamad Ramli
- (Malaysia) Abdul Aziz Azizan
- (Malaysia) Syed Alwi Syed Abdullah
- (Malaysia) Romli Ghani
- (Malaysia) Husin Jaafar
- (Malaysia) Norazam Ishak
- (Malaysia) K. Ravichandran
- (Malaysia) Naina Mohamad
- (Malaysia) Idris Man
- (Malaysia) Hamizan Ishak
- (Malaysia) Abdull Rahman Tasu
- (Malaysia) Koet King Heong
- (Malaysia) Karim Pin
- (Malaysia) Faridzul Kassim
- (Malaysia) Khor Sek Leng
- (Malaysia) Mosthakeen Omar
- (Malaysia) Syed Ahmad
- (Malaysia) Roshidi Shaari
- (Malaysia) Looi Loon Teik
- (Malaysia) Yusof Bakar

== See also ==
- List of Kedah Darul Aman F.C. honours and achievements
