= Kahê =

Brazilian footballer

Carlos Kahê
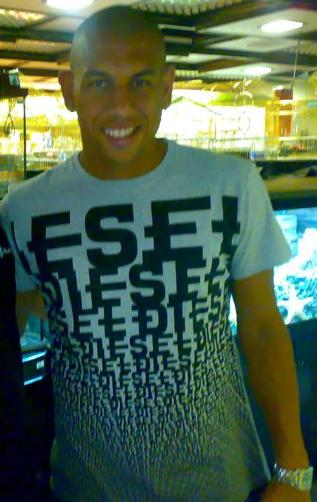
- Kahê in 2010

Personal information
- Full name: Carlos Eduardo de Souza Floresta
- Date of birth: August 28, 1982 (age 44)
- Place of birth: São Paulo, Brazil
- Height: 1.87 m (6 ft 2 in)
- Position: Forward

Youth career
- 1998–2001: Portuguesa

Senior career*
Years	Team	Apps	(Gls)
2002–2004	Nacional	3	(0)
2004–2005	Palmeiras	14	(4)
2005	Ponte Preta	20	(11)
2005–2007	Borussia Mönchengladbach	53	(6)
2007–2010	Gençlerbirliği	86	(18)
2010–2013	Manisaspor	95	(28)
2013–2014	Denizlispor	33	(11)
2014–2015	Karşıyaka	29	(7)
2015	Oeste	9	(1)
2016	Kedah F.A.	12	(4)
Total		354	(90)

International career
2002	Brazil U20	3	(2)
- * Club domestic league appearances and goals

Carlos Eduardo de Souza Floresta (born August 28, 1982), best known as Kahê, is a Brazilian former professional footballer who played as a forward. He played for Oeste, Nacional, Palmeiras, Gençlerbirliği, Manisaspor, Karşıyaka, Denizlispor, Ponte Preta and Borussia Mönchengladbach.
