= Azmeer Yusof =

Malaysian footballer

Personal information
- Full name: Azmeer bin Yusof
- Date of birth: 25 May 1987 (age 39)
- Place of birth: Taiping, Malaysia
- Height: 1.70 m (5 ft 7 in)
- Position: Left back

Team information
- Current team: USTAZ BOLA FC
- Number: 25

Youth career
- 2006–2007: Kuala Lumpur U-17

Senior career*
Years	Team	Apps	(Gls)
2008	Kuala Lumpur	8	(5)
2009	Proton	20	(2)
2010–2011	Perak	31	(1)
2011–2012	Pos Malaysia	17	(0)
2012	→ Negeri Sembilan (loan)	6	(0)
2012–2013	Negeri Sembilan	18	(0)
2014–2015	Perak	34	(0)
2015	ATM	18	(0)
2016	Kedah	20	(0)
2017–2018	Kuala Lumpur	23	(0)
2019	Kedah	16	(0)
2023	Harini F.C.	0	(0)
- Ustaz Bola FC (Present)
- * Club domestic league appearances and goals as of 21 November 2024

Azmeer bin Yusof (born 25 May 1987) is a retired Malaysian professional footballer who plays for Malaysia Super League side Kedah as a left back. He played and also coach with DEHARAMAIN UBFC in the A3 League 2024.

== Club career ==
Azmeer has played with Kuala Lumpur and Proton before signing with Perak in 2010. He later was released by Perak at the end of 2011 season.

For the 2012 season, Azmeer signed with Pos Malaysia. He joined Negeri Sembilan on a three-month loan in August 2012 for the 2012 Malaysia Cup campaign. He later signed with Negeri Sembilan permanently for the 2013 Malaysia Super League season. After only a season with Negeri Sembilan, he returned to Perak FA for the 2014 Malaysia Super League season.

Azmeer later signed with ATM for 2015 season before moved to Kedah in 2016. He signed with the amateur team Kelana United for the 2021 season. Kelana United competed in the Subang Football League alongside Najmi Football.

== Career statistics ==
=== Club ===
As of 11 March 2020

Club	Season	League		Cup		League Cup		Continental		Total	
Club	Season	Apps	Goals	Apps	Goals	Apps	Goals	Apps	Goals	Apps	Goals
Kedah	2016	20	0	6	1	8	0	–	–	34	1
Kedah	Total	20	0	6	1	8	0	0	0	34	1
Kuala Lumpur	2017	16	0	1	0	2	0	–	–	19	0
Kuala Lumpur	2018	7	0	0	0	0	0	–	–	7	0
Kuala Lumpur	Total	23	0	1	0	2	0	0	0	26	0
Kedah	2019	13	0	4	0	7	0	–	–	24	0
Kedah	2020	3	0	0	0	0	0	–	–	3	0
Kedah	Total	16	0	4	0	7	0	0	0	27	0
Career total		0	0	0	0	0	0	0	0	0	0

== Honours ==
Kedah

- Malaysia Cup: 2016
- Malaysia FA Cup: 2019

Kuala Lumpur

- Malaysia Premier League: 2017
