= Kedah Darul Aman F.C. =

Malaysian football club

Kedah Darul Aman
- Full name: Kedah Darul Aman Football Club
- Nicknames: Sang Kenari (The Canaries); Hijau Kuning (Green and Yellow)
- Short name: KDA
- Founded: 1924; 102 years ago as KAFA (amateur); 2021; 5 years ago, as Kedah Darul Aman (privatised)
- Ground: Darul Aman Stadium; MPKP Mini Stadium
- Capacity: 32,387; 5,000
- Owner: Tan Sri Dr. Mohd Daud Bakar
- CEO: Mohamad Faidhi Mohd Rohdzi
- Head coach: Azzmi Aziz
- League: Malaysia A2 Amateur League
- 2025–26: A1 Semi-Pro League, relegated
Home colours	Away colours

Kedah Darul Aman Football Club (Malay: Kelab Bola Sepak Kedah Darul Aman) is an amateur football club based in Alor Setar, Kedah. The club, originally under the administration of the Kedah Football Association, turned professional in 1994 and was privatised in 2021. Today, it is managed by Darulaman Football Club Sdn. Bhd., under the ownership of Tan Sri Dr. Mohd Daud Bakar.

The club currently competes in the Malaysia A1 Semi-Pro League, the second tier of Malaysian football. They are the first club in the history of Malaysian football to win two consecutive trebles, in 2006–07 and 2007–08, under the guidance of Mohd Azraai Khor Abdullah. Overall, Kedah Darul Aman has won 3 Malaysia Super League titles, 4 Malaysia Premier League titles, 5 Malaysia FA Cups, 5 Malaysia Cups, and 3 Piala Sumbangsih titles.

== History ==
=== Foundation and growth ===
The football club was founded in 1924 by Tunku Yaacob ibni Sultan Abdul Hamid Halim Shah as president, though they only had limited success until the appointment of Ahmad Basri Akil as manager in 1985. Under Ahmad Basri Akil, the club qualified for six Malaysia Cup final matches in a seven-year period between 1987 and 1993; and won two Malaysia Cup titles, one league title and one FA Cup title.

Kedah became semi-professional in 1989 and fully professional in 1994, while still remaining under the KFA's purview.

=== Golden treble era and aftermath ===
==== Azraai Khor era ====
The club experienced a lean period in the late 1990s but enjoyed a revival in the new millennium by achieving back-to-back domestic trebles under Azraai Khor. The club also reached 111th position in IFFHS club world ranking between 1 August 2007 to 31 July 2008. However, the club experienced a dip in performances thereafter as a result of the loss of their influential import players; including Nelson San Martín, Cornelius Huggins and Marlon James. Problems with the new management team also led to Azraai Khor's departure.

==== 2010 ====
In 2010, Ahmad Yusof replaced Azraai Khor as the head coach of Kedah FA. He guided Kedah to the final of the 2010 Malaysia FA Cup, where the team lost 5–4 on penalties to Negeri Sembilan after a 1–1 draw in regular time.

==== 2011 ====
On 17 March 2011, Ahmad Yusof is replaced by assistant coach, Muhamad Radhi Mat Din immediately after the demoralised the squad slumped to a shock 1–0 defeat at the hands of Felda United in the 2011 Malaysia FA Cup. One month later, Wan Jamak takes charge of Kedah.

==== 2012 ====
Kedah were relegated to the second-tier of Malaysian football, the Malaysian Premier League, after losing 3–2 in the playoff final to Sri Pahang in a penalty shootout during the 2012 Malaysia Super League season. On 10 August 2012, Marijo Tot was hired to replace Wan Jamak in an attempt to bring the club back to Malaysia Super League during the 2013 Malaysia Premier League season. Furthermore, that season also saw the return of former Kedah's talisman, Nelson San Martín.

==== 2013 ====
When the club failed to get promoted, Marijo Tot chose not to renew his contract with Kedah until the end of July 2013. In November 2013, Kedah announced that Dave Mitchell had been appointed as head coach for the 2014 Malaysia Premier League season.

==== 2014 ====
Due to disagreements within the club, Dave Mitchell stepped down from his position as head coach. On 10 April 2014, Tan Cheng Hoe was appointed as the head coach of Kedah FA. One of his key players, Billy Mehmet, made an immediate impact by helping the club reach the semi-finals of the 2014 Malaysia Cup. Kedah won the first leg 3–1 but were eliminated after losing the second leg 5–1. Mehmet ended the season as the club's top scorer in both the 2014 Malaysia Premier League and in all competitions. He was also the second-highest goal scorer across all levels of Malaysian professional football that season.

=== Return to prominence ===
==== 2015 ====
The 2015 season marked a successful campaign for the club. After spending two years in the Malaysia Premier League, they won the championship and earned promotion back to the top flight. Their league success was driven by consistent performances and the goal-scoring contributions of Chidi Edeh. In the 2015 Malaysia Cup the club delivered a strong performance by reaching the final, although they ultimately fell short of winning the title when lose to Selangor 2–0.

==== 2016 ====
One year later, the club went on to win the 2016 Malaysia Cup, their fifth in the club's history, by defeating the same final opponent as last year, Selangor in a dramatic final. The match ended 1–1 after extra time, with Kedah winning 6–5 on penalties. In the 2016 Malaysia Super League, Kedah finished third, marking a strong performance at the highest level of Malaysian football. The 2016 season was also their first in the top flight following promotion from the 2015 Malaysia Premier League campaign.

==== 2017 ====
In 2017, they began the year by winning the 2017 Piala Sumbangsih (Charity Shield) against Johor Darul Ta'zim with a 5–4 penalty-shootout victory following a 1–1 draw. On 23 May 2017, Nidzam Adzha was officially appointed head coach of Kedah, replacing Tan Cheng Hoe, who had joined the Malaysia national football team as an assistant coach. With him incharge, Kedah finished 4th in the Super League. They also captured the 2017 Malaysia FA Cup title by defeating Pahang 3–2 in the final. In the Malaysia Cup, they ended the campaign as runners-up when they lose to Johor 0–2. Overall, the 2017 season saw Kedah maintain competitive form across multiple competitions, adding the FA Cup trophy to their honours and reinforcing their status among Malaysia's top-flight clubs.

==== 2018 ====
The Spaniard, Roman Marcote, who had previously worked as the assistant coached for Tan Cheng Hoe in 2015, became Kedah's head coach with Nidzam Adzha as his assistant. However, the team struggled under Marcote's tenure, and following poor results, he was replaced mid-season and Nidzam Adzha reappointed as head coach for the remainder of the 2018 campaign.

=== Revival under Aidil Sharin ===
==== Aidil Sharin Appointed ====
Following a challenging 2018 season, in which Kedah finished mid-table in the 2018 Malaysia Super League and were eliminated early in both the Malaysia FA Cup and Malaysia Cup, the club appointed Singaporean head coach Aidil Sharin Sahak on 8 October 2018 to lead the team in the 2019 Malaysia Super League season.

==== 2019 ====
On his first match as head coach on 2 February 2019, Kedah won 2–0 against PKNP with goals coming from Shakir Hamzah and Jonatan Bauman goal. On 8 March 2019, Aidil Sharin experienced his first defeat in charge of Kedah as the club fell to a 1–0 defeat at the hands of Sri Pahang. Kedah finished in fourth position in the Malaysia Super League in Aidil Sharin first season in charge, one position higher than the previous season. On 27 July 2019, Aidil Sharin led Kedah to win the 2019 Malaysia FA Cup as Fadzrul Danel scored in the dying minute in extra time securing a 1–0 win over Perak in the final. On 26 October 2019, Kedah reached the final of the 2019 Malaysia Cup following a massive 8–8 aggregate against Sri Pahang seeing Kedah through on away goals rules, However Kedah was beaten 3–0 by Johor Darul Ta'zim in the decisive game at the Bukit Jalil National Stadium.

==== 2020 ====
Aidil Sharin Sahak also became the first Singaporean head coach to manage a non-Singaporean team in the AFC Champions League when he guided Kedah into the 2020 AFC Champions League qualifying play-offs round in which they thrash Hong Kong club, Tai Po 5–1 in the preliminary round 2 and thus seeing them advance to face FC Seoul in the play-off round which subsequently ended up as a 4–1 defeat at the Seoul World Cup Stadium.

=== Privatisation and new leadership ===
==== 2021 ====
Prior to the 2021 season, the club was rebranded from Kedah FA to Kedah Darul Aman.[1] On 25 November 2021, Tan Sri Dr. Mohd Daud Bakar was appointed chairman of Kedah Darul Aman by the President of the Kedah Football Association, Dato' Seri Haji Muhammad Sanusi Md. Nor.

An entrepreneur with experience in multiple industries, Mohd Daud Bakar has held leadership roles in several national institutions. His appointment signaled the team's focus on strengthening the club's long-term sustainability, governance, and overall professionalism.

As the majority shareholder, Mohd Daud Bakar outlined plans to establish a world-class training centre, aiming for recognition by FIFA. This project, with an estimated budget of RM20 million, was announced during a press conference on 9 February 2022 following the introduction of the club's official sponsors and partners. Beyond serving as a high-performance facility, the training centre is also intended to become a new tourist attraction in Kedah, further contributing to the state's development.

==== 2022 ====
On 17 October 2022, it was announced that Kedah Darul Aman had parted ways with Aidil Sharin. He departed Kedah Darul Aman with a record of 55 wins, 20 draws, and 35 defeats in 110 games with a win percentage of 50%. During the four years tenure as head coach, Aidil Sharin guided Kedah to several highs, including emerging as 2019 Malaysia FA Cup champions, 2019 Malaysia Cup runners-up, 2020 and 2021 Malaysia Super League runners-up as well as reaching the 2022 AFC Cup ASEAN Zone semi-finals. On the same day, his assistant and also Kedah legend, Victor Andrag was named as interim coach guiding the club in the upcoming 2022 Malaysia Cup which commence on 26 October 2022.

On 6 December 2022, former Terengganu head coach, Nafuzi Zain was appointed to guide Kedah Darul Aman for the upcoming 2023 Malaysia Super League season.

==== 2023 ====
In January 2023, Kedah Darul Aman started their 2023 season heading to Turkey for a week pre-season training camp in Antalya playing a couple of friendlies match against FC Nasaf, Shakhter Karagandy, FC Maktaaral and Metalist Kharkiv before returning home. On 26 August 2023, Kedah Darul Aman ended Johor Darul Ta'zim winning streak in the league with goals from Ifedayo Olusegun and Manuel Ott to take the 2–0 lead for Kedah Darul Aman before the opposition come back to take the lead to 2–3 however in the dying minute in the game, Amirbek Juraboev scored the equaliser to settled for a draw which was considered a huge upset for the away side. In 2023 Malaysia Super League, Nafuzi Zain's squad finished fourth position.

=== Relegation and the road to recovery ===
==== 2024 ====
On 24 November 2024, following Nafuzi Zain's resignation, Victor Andrag was named the interim head coach. The 2024–25 season was a difficult campaign for Kedah Darul Aman, as although the club finished 11th in the 2024–25 Malaysia Super League, they were ejected and relegated to the Malaysia A1 Semi-Pro League for failing to meet the MFL's financial and licensing requirements. They were also eliminated early in both the Malaysia FA Cup and Malaysia Cup, though they reached the semifinals of the 2024–25 MFL Challenge Cup. The season was further affected by a three-point deduction and a fine for unpaid salary arrears, reflecting ongoing financial and administrative challenges.

==== 2025 ====
For 2025–26 Malaysia A1 Semi-Pro League, the club began playing their home matches at the Stadium Mini Majlis Perbandaran Kubang Pasu (MPKP) in Jitra, Kedah, as part of the club's restructuring and road to recovery following administrative and financial challenges that affected their 2024–25 campaign.

== Club culture ==
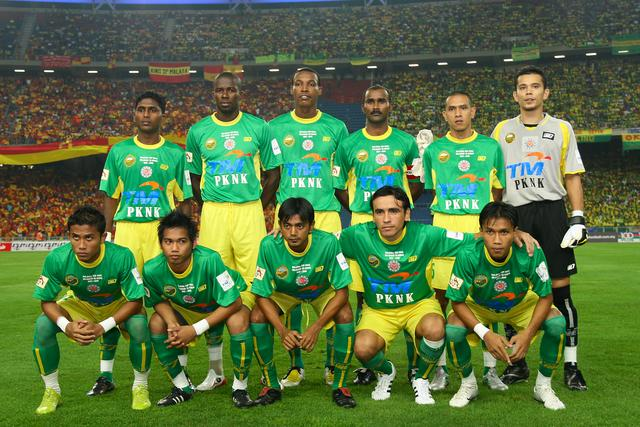
Kedah Darul Aman lineup in 2008

The song 'Biar Jasa Jadi Kenangan', written by Ahmad Basri Akil and recorded by a Malaysian musician Freddie Fernandez, is the anthem of the club, and has been sung by the crowd since 1987.

== Criticism ==
Kedah Darul Aman faced heavy criticism surrounding its treatment of Chilean technical director Nelson San Martin amid the club's financial crisis. The controversy intensified after reports that San Martin had gone unpaid for several months, despite remaining under contract with the club. San Martin publicly expressed his disappointment with the management, claiming that the lack of salary payments had severely affected his personal life. He also criticized the club for poor communication and failing to resolve contractual issues.

== Rivalries ==
Penang are the biggest rivals of the club. Kedah's fans considered their main rivalries to be with (in order) Penang, Perlis and Perak. Matches against fellow northern region sides Tambun Tulang, Kuala Muda Naza, Kedah United, Sungai Ara, PBAPP, SDMS Kepala Batas, Perak YBU and Kedah FA state football team have only taken place intermittently, due to the clubs often being in separate divisions.

=== Northern Region Derby ===
Northern Region Derby is the name given to football matches that involves Kedah Darul Aman and Penang.

== Stadium ==
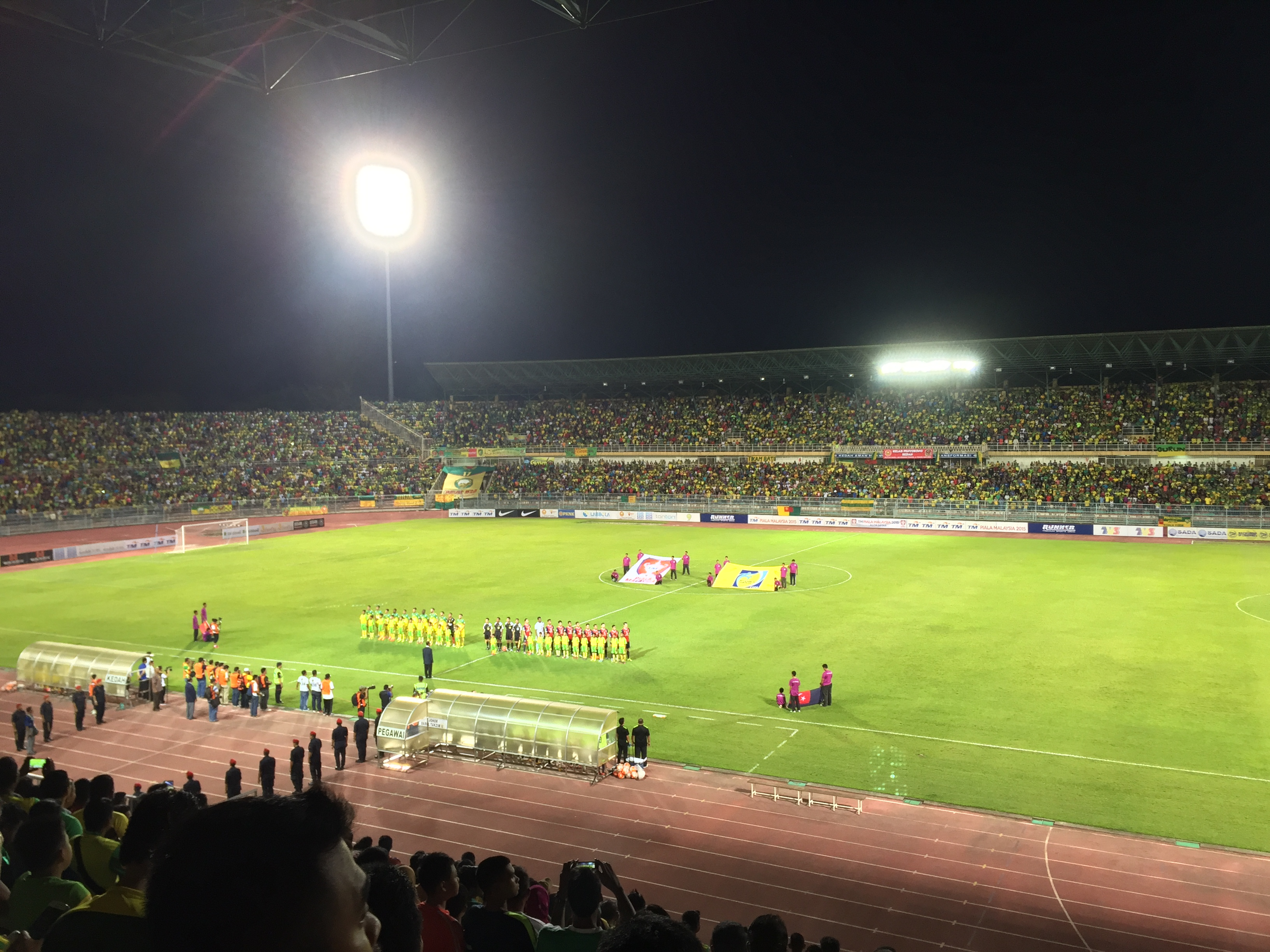
Full house at the Darul Aman Stadium during Kedah vs Johor Darul Ta'zim II in 2015

Kedah Darul Aman has been mostly based at the Darul Aman Stadium. Opened by the Sultan of Kedah, Dziaddin Mukarram Shah I in 1962, it has a capacity of 32,387 spectators.

== Kit manufacturers and shirt sponsors ==
Period	Kit manufacturer	Shirt sponsor
2004	(Italy) Lotto	Dunhill
2005	(Italy) Lotto	Celcom, Modenas
2005–06	(France) Line 7	Celcom, Modenas
2006–07	(France) Line 7	TM, PKNK
2007–08	(France) Line 7	TM, PKNK
2009	(Italy) Lotto	TM, PKNK
2010	(Italy) Lotto	TM, PKNK
2011	(Italy) Lotto	PKNK
2012	(France) Line 7	PKNK
2013	(France) Line 7	PKNK
2014	(France) Line 7	PKNK
2015	(Thailand) Warrix	PKNK, Sada, Naza, Firefly
2016	(Thailand) Warrix	Bina Darulaman Berhad (BDB), PKNK, Sada, Cosmic
2017	(Malaysia) aL by Al-Ikhsan	ECK Development Berhad (ECK), Bina Darulaman Berhad (BDB), PKNK, Sada, Cosmic
2018	(Malaysia) aL by Al-Ikhsan	ECK Development Berhad (ECK), PKNK, Sada, Cosmic
2019	(Italy) Lotto	Menteri Besar Sdn Bhd (MBI), PKNK, Sada
2020	(Italy) Lotto	Chenang Bay, Menteri Besar Sdn Bhd, PKNK
2021	(Italy) Lotto	Widad Langkasuka, Menteri Besar Sdn Bhd, PKNK
2022	(Italy) Lotto	DXN, Menteri Besar Sdn Bhd, PKNK
2023	(Italy) Lotto	Bin Zayed Internacional, Langkawi Pure
2024	(Malaysia) ALX by Al-Ikhsan	Arab Street, SuperbestPower, Weststar

== Crest and colours ==
Kedah Darul Aman's traditional colours are red and black, but the home kit's colours have been green and yellow since 1988. The colours were the result of the former Kedah Football Association deputy president Ahmad Basri Akil's request. The colours of green and yellow were chosen as they referenced the state's nickname of Jelapang padi or Paddy field.

The club crest was announced by Ahmad Basri Akil alongside the club's official colours of green and yellow in 1988. Green dominates the background; the side of the crest shows 11 joint bordered lines which signify the 11 districts of the Kedah state. At the centre of the crest is a ball and Allamanda flowers; as the flower is green and yellow in colour, with the team motto (Malay: Biar Jasa Jadi Kenangan) written in yellow.

== Players ==
=== Current squad ===
As of 1 August 2025

Note: Flags indicate national team as defined under FIFA eligibility rules; some limited exceptions apply. Players may hold more than one non-FIFA nationality.

No.	Pos.	Nation	Player
1	GK	MAS	Aqil
3	DF	MAS	Danish
4	DF	MAS	Amir Hariz
5	DF	MAS	Hilal
6	MF	MAS	Faris
7	MF	MAS	Amil
8	MF	MAS	Sharul
9	FW	MAS	Aliff Akram
10	FW	MAS	Sharul Azziz
11	MF	MAS	Athan Chia
13	DF	MAS	Syanas
14	FW	MAS	Ammar

No.	Pos.	Nation	Player
16	FW	MAS	Fizzy Mohamed
17	MF	MAS	Hairil
27	FW	MAS	Che Aizil
30	DF	MAS	Zamri Pin Ramli (captain)
41	DF	MAS	Fakhrullah Ahmad Shukri
55	MF	MAS	Iman Safwan Mohd Harris
66	DF	MAS	Haziq Hakimi
71	DF	MAS	Adam Nor
79	GK	MAS	Wan Syazmin
80	MF	MAS	Anas Amdan
81	MF	MAS	Eirwan

== Staff and management ==
=== Senior officials ===
As of 1 August 2025

Position	Name
Owner	(Malaysia) Tan Sri Dr. Mohd Daud Bakar
CEO	(Malaysia) Shahrul Samsudin
Honorary treasurer	(Malaysia) Ruzaini Radzi
Chief of business development	(Malaysia) Mohamad Faidhi Bin Mohd Rohdzi

=== Club officials ===
Position	Name
Technical director	(Chile) Nelson San Martín
Team manager	(Malaysia) Muhammad Faqrul Asyraf Bin Mohd Faizol
Head coach	(Malaysia) Azzmi Aziz
Assistant coach	(Malaysia) Kamal Daut
Goalkeeper coach	(Malaysia) Abdul Rashid Johari
Fitness coach	(Malaysia) Ahmad Nizan Ariffin
Team doctor	(Malaysia) Tan Cheng Liang
Physio	(Malaysia) Sajidur Rahman Habibur Rahman
Team staff	(Malaysia) Muhammad Faiz Shamsudin (Malaysia) Nik Mohd Nor Azam Nik Aziz
Media officer	(Malaysia) Khairil Ajhar Jaafar

== List of former coaches (KDA era) ==
Years	Name
2018–2022	(Singapore) Aidil Sharin
2022	(Malaysia) Victor Andrag (interim)
2023–2024	(Malaysia) Nafuzi Zain
2024–2025	(Malaysia) Victor Andrag (interim)

== Club records ==
As of 2025–26 season

Note:

- Pld = Played, W = Won, D = Drawn, L = Lost, F = Goals for, A = Goals against, D = Goal difference, Pts= Points, Pos = Position

1st or Champions 2nd or Runner-up 3rd place Promotion Relegation

3317333117115191821412181623
Season	League										Cup			Asia	
Season	Division	Pld	W	D	L	F	A	D	Pts	Pos	Charity	Malaysia	FA	Competition	Result
2004	Super League	21	4	3	14	30	45	−15	15	7th	—	Runners-up	2nd round	—	—
2005	Premier League	21	13	7	1	44	11								
46	Premier League	2nd	–	Quarter-final	2nd round	–	–								
2005–06	21	13	3	5	39	22									
42	1st	–	Group stage	1st round	–	–									
2006–07	Super League	24	17	4	3	54	21								
55	Super League	1st	–	Champions	Champions	–	–								
2007–08	Super League	24	18	2	4	55	24								
56	Super League	1st	Runners-up	Champions	Champions	AFC Cup	Quarter-finals								
2009	Super League	26	16	3	7	45	28								
51	Super League	3rd	Runner-up	Group stage	2nd round	AFC Cup	Round of 16								
2010	26	10	8	8	34	23									
38	5th	–	Semi-finals	Runner-up	–	–									
2011	26	13	6	7	25	20									
45	4th	–	Group stage	2nd round	–	–									
2012	26	7	7	12	27	38	−11	28	12th	–	Group stage	Semi-final	–	–	
2013	Premier League	22	13	3	6	38	19								
42	Premier League	4th	–	Group stage	2nd round	–	–								
2014	Premier League	22	11	5	6	43	25								
38	4th	–	Semi-final	Quarter-final	–	–									
2015	22	14	6	2	47	26									
48	1st	–	Runner-up	3rd round	–	–									
2016	Super League	22	11	7	4	30	26								
37 (Note: Kedah Darul Aman F.C. was found guilty of fielding a suspended player against Pahang on 3 August 2016. The Football Association of Malaysia awarded three points to Pahang.)	Super League	3rd	–	Champions	Semi-final	–	–								
2017	Super League	22	9	8	5	45	33								
35	Super League	4th	Champions	Runner-up	Champions	–	–								
2018	Super League	22	9	5	8	37	36								
32	Super League	6th	Runners-up	Group stage	3rd round	–	–								
2019	Super League	22	9	7	6	37	29								
34	Super League	4th	—	Runner-up	Champions	–	–								
2020	Super League	11	7	1	3	20	13	7	22	2nd	Runners-up	—	—	ACL Cup	Play-off round
2021	22	13	4	5	44	28									
43	2nd	Runners-up	Quarter-final	—	AFC Cup	—									
2022	22	8	3	11	32	41									
27	8th	—	Round of 16	Second round	AFC Cup	Zonal semi final									
2023	26	—	17	2	7	52	29								
53	4th	—	Round 16	First round	—										
2024–25	24	—	6	6	—		12	21	51						
21	11th	Round 16	Semi-final		—										
2025–26	A1 Semi-Pro League	28	0	1	27	9	93	−84	1	15th	DNQ	DNQ			

== Honours ==
=== Domestic ===
==== League ====
- Division 1/Premier 1/Super League (3): 1993, 2006–07, 2007–08
  - Runners-up (6): 1994, 1996, 1997, 2003, 2020, 2021
- Division 2/Premier 2/Premier League (4): 1992, 2002, 2005–06, 2015
  - Runners-up (1): 2005

==== Cup ====
- Malaysia FA Cup (5): 1996, 2007, 2008, 2017, 2019
  - Runners-up (1): 2010
- Malaysia Cup (5): 1990, 1993, 2007, 2008, 2016
  - Runners-up (9): 1940, 1987, 1988, 1989, 1992, 2004, 2015, 2017, 2019
- Piala Sumbangsih (3): 1991, 1994, 2017
  - Runners-up (6): 1997, 2008, 2009, 2018, 2020, 2021

==== Youth ====
- Malaysian President's Cup (3): 1991, 2000, 2003
  - Runners-up (1): 2018
- Malaysian Youth Cup (1): 2017

=== Double ===
Season	Titles won
1993	Liga Semi-Pro Divisyen 1, Malaysia Cup
2017	Malaysian Charity Cup, Malaysia FA Cup

=== Treble ===
Season	Titles won
2007	Malaysia Super League, Malaysia FA Cup, Malaysia Cup
2008	Malaysia Super League, Malaysia FA Cup, Malaysia Cup

Kedah Darul Aman's former assistant coach Muhamad Radhi Mat Din said

To achieve the treble in two consecutive seasons will take another 100 years or more to come by! It takes a Herculean effort to achieve a double treble. The path to the pinnacle required a lot of sacrifices and commitment from the players, team management and the club.

== Continental record ==
All results (home and away) list Kedah Darul Aman's goal tally first.

Season	Competition	Round	Club	Home	Away	Aggregate
1994–95	Asian Club Championship	First round	(South Korea) Ilhwa Chunma	1–5	3–5	4–10
2008	AFC Cup	Group stage	(Singapore) Home United	4–1	1–5	2nd out of 4
2008	AFC Cup	Group stage	(Hong Kong) South China	3–0	3–1	2nd out of 4
2008	AFC Cup	Group stage	(Maldives) Victory	1–0	1–1	2nd out of 4
2008	AFC Cup	Quarter-final	(Bahrain) Al-Muharraq	1–2	0–5	1–7
2009	AFC Cup	Group stage	(Thailand) Chonburi	0–1	1–3	2nd out of 4
2009	AFC Cup	Group stage	(Hong Kong) Eastern	2–0	3–3	2nd out of 4
2009	AFC Cup	Group stage	(Vietnam) Hanoi ACB	7–0	1–3	2nd out of 4
2009	AFC Cup	Round of 16	(Vietnam) Binh Duong	2–8		
2020	AFC Champions League	Preliminary Round 2	(Hong Kong) Tai Po	5–1		
2020	AFC Champions League	Play-off round	(South Korea) FC Seoul	1–4		
2021	AFC Cup	Group H	(Indonesia) Persipura Jayapura	Cancelled		
2021	AFC Cup	Group H	(Vietnam) Saigon	Cancelled		
2021	AFC Cup	Group H	(Singapore) Lion City Sailors	Cancelled		
2022	AFC Cup	Group G	(Indonesia) Bali United	0–2		1st out of 4
2022	AFC Cup	Group G	(Philippines) Kaya–Iloilo	4–1		1st out of 4
2022	AFC Cup	Group G	(Cambodia) Visakha	5–1		1st out of 4
2022	AFC Cup	ASEAN Zonal Semi-final	(Indonesia) PSM Makassar	1–2		

== Performance in AFC competitions ==
- AFC Champions League: 1 appearance
  - 2020: Play-off round
- AFC Cup: 2 appearances
  - 2008: Quarter-final
  - 2009: Round of 16

== See also ==
- List of Kedah Darul Aman F.C. honours and achievements
- List of Kedah Darul Aman F.C. players
- Kedah Darul Aman FC–Kedah FA state football team schism
