= 2012 Kuala Lumpur FA season =

Kuala Lumpur
2012 season
- President: Astaman Abdul Aziz
- Manager: Rusli Baba
- Head Coach: Razip Ismail
- Super League: 14th (relegated)
- FA Cup: Round of 16
- Malaysia Cup: Not qualified
- Top goalscorer: League: Afiq Azmi, Zakaria Charara (4); All: Afiq Azmi (5)

The 2012 season was the 34th season in Kuala Lumpur's existence, and their third consecutive year in the top flight of Malaysian football. Kuala Lumpur were subsequently relegated to the 2013 Malaysia Premier League.

After losing more than half of their squad from the previous season owing to financial difficulties, Kuala Lumpur begin the 2012 season as relegation battlers. Due to the poor condition of the KLFA Stadium pitch, KL have elected to play their home games at the Hang Jebat Stadium in Malacca.

== Season review ==
=== Pre-season ===
Kuala Lumpur began their pre-season schedule by handing trials to a host of players to replace more than half of the squad decimated by player departures. KL failed to score in their first four friendly games which ended in defeats to Police (0-3), touring team Joga Limpo of Brazil (0-3), Johor FC (0-1) and Armed Forces (0-2).

Following the close of the pre-season transfer window on December 8, 2011, KL were left with an all-local line up after a FA employee bungled the transfer of Nigerian defender Raimi Ayo Hassan. Results in friendly matches did not improve as KL were beaten by Johor (0-1) and Terengganu (1-2) though KL finally scored through Afiq Azmi. KL ended a run of six defeats by holding Pos Malaysia 1-1 before defeats against Kelantan (0-2) and Sime Darby (0-1) followed. KL wrapped up their pre-season fixtures with a 1–1 draw against FAM League side Malacca.

=== January ===
KL did not have the best of starts, falling to a 2–0 defeat away to Sarawak in the opening Super League match in Kuching. Seven players made their KL debut, including three who were playing in the top-flight for the first time, an indication of the raw material coach Razip Ismail has to work with. After going down two more defeats to Kuala Terengganu T-Team (0-3) and Singapore LionsXII (1-2), KL finally claimed their first point of the season with a 1–1 home draw against PKNS and ended the month with a 3–0 defeat to Super League champions Kelantan to remain firmly rooted at the bottom of the standings.

In a bid to boost the team's struggle against relegation, KL agreed to a loan deal with Kelantan to bring in foreign players Zakaria Charara and Emmanuel Okine until the end of the season while releasing Raimi Ayo Hassan from his contract.

=== February ===
Charara and Okine made their KL debut on February 8 against Kedah but could not prevent the team from going down 1–0. Things got worst as Okine was sent off in the next match against Johor FC in a 2–0 defeat before another 2–0 loss at Sabah followed. KL finally claimed their first competitive win of the season, and their first clean-sheet, with a 3-0 success over Muar Municipal Council in the FA Cup.

=== March ===
KL's woes in the league continued when they suffered an eighth defeat, a 1–0 loss to Terengganu. KL then exited the FA Cup in the second round after a 3–2 defeat away to Kelantan before losing to Klang Valley rivals Selangor 3–0 in the league. KL ended a seven-match run in the league with a goal from Afiq Azmi, who earned a call-up to the national team for the first time this month, but it was not enough to prevent a 2–1 defeat to Negeri Sembilan.

=== April ===
April began in the same fashion as March ended with KL losing 2–1 at Perak as Emmanuel Okine scored his first goal for the team. KL then suffered their heaviest defeat of the season in a 4-0 city derby loss to Felda United, ending the first round of the league with just one point from 13 games, and setting an unwanted club-record of nine straight league defeats, eclipsing the previous worst of eight-in-a-row set in 1980. The second round began on the same note as KL fell 1–0 to Felda United in the return fixture.

=== May ===
KL began May on a positive note, holding Sarawak to a 1–1 draw for its second point in the league and halting a club-record of 10 consecutive league defeats. But another setback followed when KL went down 2–1 at Kuala Terengganu T-Team in their following match. KL achieved its first clean-sheet in the league in holding Singapore LionsXII to a 0–0 draw at home.

=== June ===
KL returned to action after a three-week break resuming where they left off by holding PKNS 1–1 in Petaling Jaya, KL's first away point in the league. KL's next game was a scheduled home match against Kelantan but chose to play it away to cash in on the gate collection and promptly lost 1–0. The next defeat, 2–1 to Kedah, meant KL could no longer qualify for the Malaysia Cup. A 1–0 defeat to Johor FC in the subsequent game confirmed relegation from the Super League with five matches to spare before ending June with a 4-2 reverse against Sabah.

=== July ===
Entering the final month of competition, KL's quest for a first league win continues after a 2–1 defeat at Terengganu. Selangor dealt KL a 4–0 defeat in the Klang Valley derby before KL claimed just their fifth point in a 1–1 draw at Negeri Sembilan. KL ended the season with a 5–2 loss against Perak and without a league victory for the first time since 1980.

=== August ===
As KL did not qualify for the Malaysia Cup, five players accepted loan offers from teams that did. They are Afiq Azmi (Kelantan), Aslam Najumudeen (Kelantan), Ahmad Dashila Tajudin (Sime Darby), Pritam Singh (Felda United) and Badrul Hisyam Azmi (PKNS). Loan recruits Emmanuel Okine, Zakaria Charara, Azrul Azmi and Khairul Anuar Jamil returned to their respective parent teams.

== League table ==
=== Super League ===
Pos	Team	Pld	W	D	L	GF	GA	GD	Pts	Qualification or relegation
1	Kelantan (C, Q)	26	18	6	2	53	18	+35	60	2013 AFC Cup group stage
2	LionsXII (Note: LionsXII are not eligible for any AFC competition spots)	26	15	5	6	48	23	+25	50	
3	Selangor (Q)	26	12	7	7	40	26	+14	43	2013 AFC Cup group stage (Note: Qualified as the next highest-placed local team behind Liga Super and 2012 Piala FA winners Kelantan.)
4	Perak	26	13	3	10	40	43	−3	42	
5	Terengganu	26	11	8	7	41	33	+8	41	

Source: RSSSF
Rules for classification: 1) points; 2) goal difference; 3) number of goals scored
(C) Champions; (Q) Qualified for the phase indicated

== Transfers ==
=== Transfers in ===
First Team

Date	Pos.	Name	From	Fee
December 2011	FW	(Malaysia) S Sivaraj	(Malaysia) Kuala Lumpur President's Cup	Free
December 2011	CB	(Malaysia) Hazwan Rahman	(Malaysia) Kuala Lumpur President's Cup	Free
December 2011	GK	(Malaysia) Rozaimie Rohim	unattached	Free
December 2011	GK	(Malaysia) Amirul Abu Seman	(Malaysia) Johor	Free
December 2011	DF	(Nigeria) Raimi Ayo Hassan	(Nigeria) Gombe United	Free
December 2011	DF	(Malaysia) Hishamuddin Othman	(Malaysia) Johor	Free
December 2011	DF	(Malaysia) Aslam Najumudeen	(Malaysia) PKNS	Free
December 2011	MF	(Malaysia) Zameer Zainun	(Malaysia) PKNS	Free
December 2011	MF	(Malaysia) Nur Hakim Adzhar	unattached	Free
December 2011	MF	(Malaysia) Pritam Singh	(Malaysia) CIMB	Free
December 2011	FW	(Malaysia) Stanley Bernard	(Malaysia) Sabah	Free
December 2011	FW	(Malaysia) Fazuan Abdullah	(Malaysia) Police	Free

Source: Kuala Lumpur FA Facebook

President's Cup Under-21

Date	Pos.	Name	From	Fee
December 2011	DF	(Malaysia) Aiman Syazwan Abdullah	(Malaysia) Young Tigers B	Free

Source: Kuala Lumpur FA Facebook

=== Loans in ===
First Team

Date	Pos.	Name	From
December 2011	DF	(Malaysia) Azrul Azmi	(Malaysia) Felda United
December 2011	MF	(Malaysia) Khairul Anuar Jamil	(Malaysia) Felda United
February 2012	FW	(Lebanon) Zakaria Charara	(Malaysia) Kelantan FA
February 2012	DF	(Ghana) Emmanuel Okine	(Malaysia) Kelantan FA

Source: Kuala Lumpur FA Facebook

=== Transfers out ===
First team

Date	Pos.	Name	To	Fee
November 2011	LW	(Malaysia) Nazrin Nawi	(Malaysia) Negeri Sembilan	Undisclosed
November 2011	CM	(Malaysia) Norismaidham Ismail	(Malaysia) Negeri Sembilan	Undisclosed
November 2011	GK	(Malaysia) Norazlan Razali	(Malaysia) Selangor	Undisclosed
November 2011	RW	(Malaysia) Fahrul Razi Kamaruddin	(Malaysia) Perak	Undisclosed
November 2011	RB	(Malaysia) Muhd Shahrom Abdul Kalam	(Malaysia) Perak	Undisclosed
November 2011	LB	(Malaysia) Mohd Fitri Jamaluddin	Universiti Sains Malaysia	Free
November 2011	CM	(Malaysia) Azwan Abdul Malek	(Malaysia) PKNS	Undisclosed
November 2011	CB	(Malaysia) Ahmad Azlan Zainal	(Malaysia) PKNS	Undisclosed
November 2011	CB	(Malaysia) Farouk Hashim	(Malaysia) PKNS	Undisclosed
November 2011	GK	(Malaysia) Remezey Che Ros	(Malaysia) PKNS	Undisclosed
November 2011	LB	(Malaysia) Mohd Farid Ramli	(Malaysia) Felda United	Undisclosed
November 2011	RW	(Malaysia) Yong Kuong Yong	(Malaysia) Felda United	Undisclosed
November 2011	MF	(Malaysia) See Kok Luen	(Malaysia) Kedah	Undisclosed
November 2011	FW	(Malaysia) Fahruzzahar Ali	(Malaysia) Johor	Undisclosed
November 2011	LB	(Malaysia) Mohd Dzaiddin Zainudin	(Malaysia) Kuala Terengganu T-Team	Undisclosed
December 2011	FW	(Malaysia) Azmi Sarmin	(Malaysia) Johor Baru City Council	Released
December 2011	MF	(Malaysia) M Ganeswaran	(Malaysia) Sime Darby FC	RM3,000
December 2011	MF	(Malaysia) Syazmin Firdaus Aminuddin		Released
December 2011	RB	(Malaysia) Kamarulzaman Mahamud		Released
January 2012	CB	(Nigeria) Raimi Ayo Hassan		Released
July 2012	CB	(Ghana) Emmanuel Okine	(Malaysia) Kelantan FA	Loan return
July 2012	FW	(Lebanon) Zakaria Charara	(Malaysia) Kelantan FA	Loan return
August 2012	DF	(Malaysia) Azrul Azmi	(Malaysia) Felda United	Loan return
August 2012	FW	(Malaysia) Khairul Anuar Jamil	(Malaysia) Felda United	Loan return

Source: Kuala Lumpur FA Facebook

=== Out on loan ===
First team

Date	Pos.	Name	To	Period
November 2011	FW	(Malaysia) Ahmad Hazwan Bakri	(Malaysia) Young Tigers A	12 months
August 2012	DF	(Malaysia) Ahmad Dashila Tajudin	(Malaysia) Sime Darby	3 months
August 2012	DF	(Malaysia) Aslam Najumudeen	(Malaysia) Kelantan	3 months
August 2012	FW	(Malaysia) Afiq Azmi	(Malaysia) Kelantan	3 months
August 2012	FW	(Malaysia) Badrul Hisyam Azmi	(Malaysia) PKNS	3 months
August 2012	MF	(Malaysia) Pritam Singh	(Malaysia) Felda United	3 months

Source: Kuala Lumpur FA Facebook

== Players ==
=== First team ===
No.	Name	Nationality	Position	Date of birth (age)	Signed from	Signed in	Contract ends	*Apps.	*Goals
Goalkeepers
1	Zahid Ahmad	(Malaysia)	GK	January 23, 1988 (age 38)	Penang	2009	2013	16	0
12	Rozaimie Rohim	(Malaysia)	GK	November 6, 1984 (age 41)	unattached	2011	2012	13	0
21	Amirul Abu Seman	(Malaysia)	GK	February 20, 1990 (age 35)	Johor	2011	2013	7	0
Defenders
3	Hishamuddin Othman	(Malaysia)	LB	November 21, 1981 (age 44)	Johor	2011	2012	31	3
4	Ahmad Jihad Ismail	(Malaysia)	RB	January 8, 1989 (age 37)	Academy	2009	2013	37	0
6	Hazwan Rahman	(Malaysia)	CB/DM	July 16, 1990 (age 35)	Perlis	2010	2012	11	0
13	Aslam Najumudeen	(Malaysia)	CB	March 12, 1983 (age 42)	PKNS	2011	2012	24	0
15	Emmanuel Okine	(Ghana)	CB/DM	December 17, 1991 (age 34)	Kelantan	2012	2012	20	2
16	Arman Fareez Mohd Ali	(Malaysia)	CB/RB	January 1, 1989 (age 37)	Academy	2009	2012	30	1
18	Azrul Azmi	(Malaysia)	CB/DM	July 19, 1988 (age 37)	Felda United	2011	2012	19	0
25	Ahmad Dashila Tajudin	(Malaysia)	CB	July 20, 1986 (age 39)	Academy	2006	2013	112	0
29	Aiman Syazwan Abdullah	(Malaysia)	LB	July 8, 1992 (age 33)	Young Tigers B	2011	2013	17	0
Midfielders
7	Syafiq Johari	(Malaysia)	CM	February 8, 1989 (age 36)	Academy	2009	2013	92	1
8	Zameer Zainun	(Malaysia)	LW	August 29, 1990 (age 35)	PKNS	2011	2012	0	0
10	Khairul Anuar Shafie	(Malaysia)	RW/FW	January 12, 1982 (age 44)	Titiwangsa	2010	2012	61	4
11	Pritam Singh	(Malaysia)	LW	August 3, 1985 (age 40)	CIMB	2011	2012	16	1
17	Zakaria Charara	(Lebanon)	CM/FW	January 1, 1986 (age 40)	Kelantan	2012	2012	19	4
24	Nur Hakim Adzhar	(Malaysia)	CM	August 17, 1989 (age 36)	unattached	2011	2012	17	0
26	Saddam Hussein Abdul Rahman	(Malaysia)	CM	January 15, 1991 (age 35)	Academy	2010	2012	1	0
27	Dzurrun Salam Ismail	(Malaysia)	CM	January 5, 1991 (age 35)	Academy	2010	2012	2	0
Forwards
5	Khairrulanuar Jamil	(Malaysia)	FW/CM	January 7, 1981 (age 45)	Felda United	2011	2012	17	0
9	Afiq Azmi	(Malaysia)	FW	January 5, 1989 (age 37)	KSK Tambun Tulang	2011	2012	43	6
14	Badrul Hisyam Azmi	(Malaysia)	FW	April 30, 1989 (age 36)	Academy	2009	2012	91	31
19	Stanley Bernard	(Malaysia)	FW	March 10, 1986 (age 39)	Sabah	2011	2012	18	5
20	Fazuan Abdullah	(Malaysia)	FW	December 11, 1984 (age 41)	Police	2011	2012	10	3
23	S Sivaraj	(Malaysia)	FW/RW	March 5, 1990 (age 35)	Academy	2010	2013	33	0
28	Syafwan Syahlan	(Malaysia)	FW	January 15, 1993 (age 33)	Academy	2010	2013	12	0

^{*}Appearances are from 2009 onwards; Goals are throughout a player's career with KL

== Matches ==
=== Friendly matches ===
30 November 2011	Police	3 – 0	Kuala Lumpur	Jalan Semarak
17:00				Stadium: Police Training Centre (Pulapol)

3 December 2011	Kuala Lumpur	0 – 3	(Brazil) Joga Limpo	Cheras
20:45			Paulo Sérgio Silvestre do Nascimento 10'; Clesly Evandro Guimarães 48', 67'	Stadium: KLFA Stadium; Attendance: 100

4 December 2011	Kuala Lumpur	0 – 1	Johor FC	Desa Melawati
16:50			Farid Ideris 76'	Stadium: KLFA Academy; Attendance: 50

6 December 2011	Kuala Lumpur	0 - 2	Armed Forces	Desa Melawati
16:30			Christie Jayaseelan 10'; Irwan Fadzli Idrus 14'	Stadium: KLFA Academy; Attendance: 50

16 December 2011	Kuala Lumpur	0 - 1	Johor	Desa Melawati
17:00		Report	Ahmad Syamim Yahya 82'	Stadium: KLFA Academy; Attendance: 50

17 December 2011	Kuala Lumpur	1 - 2	Terengganu	Desa Melawati
16:30	Afiq Azmi	Report	Tércio Nunes Machado pen' Mohamadou Suamareh	Stadium: KLFA Academy; Attendance: 250

23 December 2011	Kuala Lumpur	1 - 1	Pos Malaysia	Kuala Lumpur
17:15	Khairrulanuar Jamil 56'	Report	Fakhrul Razi 54'	Stadium: Universiti Malaya; Attendance: 20

25 December 2011	Kelantan	2 - 0	Kuala Lumpur	Petaling Jaya
20:45	Denny Antwi 5' 58'	Report		Stadium: MBPJ Stadium; Attendance: 1,200

28 December 2011	Sime Darby	1 - 0	Kuala Lumpur	Serdang
17:00	Shoufiq Kusaini 58'	Report		Stadium: UPM Stadium; Attendance: 50

6 January 2012	Malacca	1 - 1	Kuala Lumpur	Telok Mas, Malacca
17:00			Fazuan Abdullah	Stadium: Henry Gurney Prisoners School

1 February 2012	Young Tigers B	3 - 3	Kuala Lumpur	Kuala Lumpur
17:00		Report	Fazuan Abdullah; Afiq Azmi; Zakaria Charara Pen'	Stadium: National Sports Complex, Malaysia

4 February 2012	Police	1 - 2	Kuala Lumpur	Jalan Semarak
17:00		Report	Zakaria Charara Pen'; Khairrulanuar Jamil	Stadium: Police Training Centre (Pulapol)

25 February 2012	Kuala Lumpur	3 - 3	Sime Darby	Serdang
17:00	Stanley Bernard, Zakaria Charara			Stadium: UPM Stadium

28 February 2012	UiTM	0 - 6	Kuala Lumpur	Shah Alam
20:30			Afiq Azmi, Syafwan Syahlan; Pritam Singh; Fazuan Abdullah; Nur Hakim Adzhar	Stadium: UiTM Stadium

22 March 2012	Kuala Lumpur	1 - 1	Pos Malaysia	Desa Melawati
17:00	Emmanuel Okine			Stadium: KLFA Academy

24 March 2012	Pahang	1 - 2	Kuala Lumpur	Temerloh
20:00	Eduard Sakhnevich		Stanley Bernard; Khairul Anuar Shafie	Stadium: Temerloh Mini Stadium

26 April 2012	Police	0 - 2	Kuala Lumpur	Jalan Semarak
17:00			S. Sivaraj; Stanley Bernard	Stadium: Police Training Centre (Pulapol)

2 June 2012	Pos Malaysia	1 - 3	Kuala Lumpur	Serdang
17:00				Stadium: UPM Stadium

4 June 2012	Kuala Lumpur	1 - 0	Johor	Bangi
17:00	S. Sivaraj			Stadium: Maybank Training Centre

7 June 2012	Pahang	3 - 2	Kuala Lumpur	Temerloh
17:00			S. Sivaraj; Stanley Bernard	Stadium: Temerloh Mini Stadium

11 June 2012	Police	3 - 0	Kuala Lumpur	Jalan Semarak
17:00				Stadium: Police Training Centre (Pulapol)

Source: Kuala Lumpur FA Facebook

=== Super League ===
10 January 2012 1	Sarawak	2 – 0	Kuala Lumpur	Kuching
20:15	K. Ravindran 74'; Hairol Mokhtar 82'	Report		Stadium: Sarawak Stadium

14 January 2012 2	Kuala Lumpur	0 – 3	Kuala Terengganu T-Team	Paya Rumput, Malacca
16:45			Zairo Anuar Zalani 32', 80'; Zachariah Simukonda 70'	Stadium: Hang Jebat Stadium; Referee: Azam Musa

17 January 2012 3	Singapore LionsXII	2 – 1	Kuala Lumpur	Singapore
19:45	Aiman Syazwan Abdullah 41' (OG); Shahdan Sulaiman 57'	Report	Fazuan Abdullah 68' (pen)	Stadium: Jalan Besar Stadium; Attendance: 7,000; Referee: Suhaizi

21 January 2012 4	Kuala Lumpur	1 – 1	PKNS	Paya Rumput, Malacca
20:45	Afiq Azmi 84'		Fauzan Dzulkifli 74'	Stadium: Hang Jebat Stadium; Referee: Nafeez Abdul Wahab

28 January 2012 5	Kelantan	3 – 0	Kuala Lumpur	Kota Bharu
20:45	Norshahrul Idlan Talaha 46'; Badhri Radzi 72'; Dennis Antwi 79'	Report		Stadium: Sultan Mohammad IV Stadium; Attendance: 20,000; Referee: Shukri Nor

8 February 2012 6	Kuala Lumpur	0 – 1	Kedah	Paya Rumput, Malacca
20:45			Khyril Muhymeen Zambri 7'	Stadium: Hang Jebat Stadium; Referee: Zamzaidi Katimin

11 February 2012 7	Kuala Lumpur	0 – 2	Johor FC	Paya Rumput, Malacca
20:45			Haris Safwan Kamal 6'; Jasazrin Jamaluddin 83'	Stadium: Hang Jebat Stadium

14 February 2012 8	Sabah	2 – 0	Kuala Lumpur	Kota Kinabalu
20:15	Rozaimi Abdul Rahman 36'; Michael Baird (footballer) 46'	Report		Stadium: Likas Stadium; Referee: Nafeez Abd Wahab

3 March 2012 9	Kuala Lumpur	0 – 1	Terengganu	Paya Rumput, Malacca
20:45			Francis Doe 61'	Stadium: Hang Jebat Stadium; Referee: Rahmat Jantan

17 March 2012 10	Selangor	3 – 0	Kuala Lumpur	Kuala Lumpur
20:45	Bosko Balaban 57'; P. Gunalan 61'; Amirulhadi Zainal 90+1'	Report		Stadium: National Stadium; Attendance: 400; Referee: Amirul Izwan Yaacob

30 March 2012 11	Kuala Lumpur	1 – 2	Negeri Sembilan	Paya Rumput, Malacca
20:45	Afiq Azmi 8'		Ahmad Shakir Mohd Ali 13' (pen); Shahurain Abu Samah 77'	Stadium: Hang Jebat Stadium; Attendance: 500; Referee: Nafeez Abd Wahab

7 April 2012 12	Perak	2 – 1	Kuala Lumpur	Ipoh
20:45	Fahrul Razi Kamaruddin 41'; Rafiuddin Roddin 63'	Report	Emmanuel Okine 90'	Stadium: Perak Stadium

13 April 2012 13	Kuala Lumpur	0 – 4	Felda United	Paya Rumput, Malacca
20:45			Nizad Ayub 22', 36', 73'; Farderin Kadir 87'	Stadium: Hang Jebat Stadium; Referee: Dennis Sayeng

17 April 2012 14	Felda United	1 – 0	Kuala Lumpur	Paya Rumput, Malacca
20:45	Mickael Antoine-Curier 56'			Stadium: Hang Jebat Stadium; Attendance: 100; Referee: Zamzaidi Katimin

5 May 2012 15	Kuala Lumpur	1 – 1	Sarawak	Paya Rumput, Malacca
20:45	Zakaria Charara 40' (pen)		Joel Epalle 50'	Stadium: Hang Jebat Stadium

12 May 2012 16	Kuala Terengganu T-Team	2 – 1	Kuala Lumpur	Kuala Terengganu
20:45	Marco Tulio 2'; Norfazly Alias 79'		Afiq Azmi 29'	Stadium: Sultan Ismail Nasiruddin Shah Stadium

15 May 2012 17	Kuala Lumpur	0 – 0	Singapore LionsXII	Paya Rumput, Malacca
20:45		Report		Stadium: Hang Jebat Stadium; Referee: Wan Tarmizi Wan Ibrahim

16 June 2012 18	PKNS	1 – 1	Kuala Lumpur	Petaling Jaya
20:45	Rudie Ramli 66'		Stanley Bernard 26'	Stadium: Petaling Jaya Stadium; Attendance: 100; Referee: Amirul Izwan

19 June 2012 19	Kuala Lumpur	0 – 1	Kelantan	Kota Bharu
20:45		Report	Mohammed Ghaddar 61' (pen)	Stadium: Sultan Mohammad IV Stadium; Attendance: 10,000; Referee: Shamsudin Ibrahim

23 June 2012 20	Kedah	2 – 1	Kuala Lumpur	Alor Star
20:45	Faizal Abu Bakar 37'; Vedran Gerc 72' (pen)	Report	Zakaria Charara 80' (pen)	Stadium: Darul Aman Stadium; Referee: Ku Alauddin Ku Mohd

26 June 2012 21	Johor FC	1 – 0	Kuala Lumpur	Pasir Gudang
20:45	Khairul Ismail 58'			Stadium: Pasir Gudang Corporation Stadium; Referee: Kamil Tumin

30 June 2012 22	Kuala Lumpur	2 – 4	Sabah	Kota Kinabalu
20:15	Zakaria Charara 73' (pen); Afiq Azmi 72'	Report	Razid Gafar 11'; Ahmad Jihad Ismail 53' (OG); Radzi Hussin 77'; Leopold Alphonso 88'	Stadium: Likas Stadium; Referee: Rahmat Jantan

3 July 2012 23	Terengganu	2 – 1	Kuala Lumpur	Kuala Terengganu
20:45	Francis Doe 16', 86'		Emmanuel Okine 33' (pen)	Stadium: Sultan Ismail Nasiruddin Shah Stadium

7 July 2012 24	Kuala Lumpur	0 – 4	Selangor	Shah Alam
20:45			Azidan Sarudin 34'; Amri Yahyah 47', 80'; Ramez Dayoub 63'	Stadium: Shah Alam Stadium; Referee: Nafeez Abdul Wahab

10 July 2012 25	Negeri Sembilan	1 – 1	Kuala Lumpur	Paroi
20:45	Ahmad Shakir Ali 55'		Pritam Singh 90'	Stadium: Tuanku Abdul Rahman Stadium

14 July 2012 26	Kuala Lumpur	2 – 5	Perak	Ipoh
20:45	Khairul Anuar Shafie 55'; 84		Michal Kubala 20' (pen), 90+2'; Albert Ebossé Bodjongo 33'; Shafiq Jamal 37'; Akmal Rizal Ahmad Rakhli 75'	Stadium: Perak Stadium

=== FA Cup ===
18 February 2012 R1	Kuala Lumpur	3 - 0	Muar Municipal Council	Paya Rumput, Malacca
20:45	Arman Fareez Mohd Ali 41' (pen); Khairul Anuar Shafie 62'; Fazuan Abdullah 90'			Stadium: Hang Jebat Stadium; Referee: Raimin Riduan

10 March 2012 R2	Kelantan	3 - 2	Kuala Lumpur	Kota Bharu
20:45	Mohd Norfarhan Mohamad 30'; Indra Putra Mahayuddin 43'; Badhri Radzi 65'	Report	Afiq Azmi 39'; Fazuan Abdullah 90+3'	Stadium: Sultan Mohammad IV Stadium; Attendance: 25,000; Referee: Shukri Abdul Rahman

== Squad statistics ==
=== Appearances and goals ===
As of 20 July 2012

No.	Pos.	Name	Super League			FA Cup			Malaysia Cup			Total		
No.	Pos.	Name	Apps	Starts	Goals	Apps	Starts	Goals	Apps	Starts	Goals	Apps	Starts	Goals
1	GK	(Malaysia) Zahid Ahmad	11	10	0	0	0	0	0	0	0	11	10	0
3	DF	(Malaysia) Hishamuddin Othman	12	11	0	2	2	0	0	0	0	14	13	0
4	DF	(Malaysia) Ahmad Jihad Ismail	14	11	0	2	2	0	0	0	0	16	13	0
5	FW	(Malaysia) Khairrulanuar Jamil	17	12	0	0	0	0	0	0	0	17	12	0
6	DF	(Malaysia) Hazwan Rahman	1	0	0	0	0	0	0	0	0	1	0	0
7	MF	(Malaysia) Syafiq Johari	25	24	0	2	2	0	0	0	0	27	26	0
8	MF	(Malaysia) Zameer Zainun	0	0	0	0	0	0	0	0	0	0	0	0
9	FW	(Malaysia) Afiq Azmi	20	15	4	2	1	1	0	0	0	22	16	5
10	FW	(Malaysia) Khairul Anuar Shafie	21	12	1	1	1	1	0	0	0	22	13	2
11	MF	(Malaysia) Pritam Singh	14	12	1	2	1	0	0	0	0	16	13	1
12	GK	(Malaysia) Rozaimie Rohim	12	12	0	1	1	0	0	0	0	13	13	0
13	DF	(Malaysia) Aslam Najumudeen	23	23	0	1	1	0	0	0	0	24	24	0
14	FW	(Malaysia) Badrul Hisyam Azmi	7	5	0	0	0	0	0	0	0	7	5	0
15	DF	(Ghana) Emmanuel Okine	19	19	2	1	1	0	0	0	0	20	20	2
16	DF	(Malaysia) Arman Fareez Mohd Ali	11	11	0	1	1	1	0	0	0	12	12	1
17	FW	(Lebanon) Zakaria Charara	18	16	4	1	1	0	0	0	0	19	17	4
18	MF	(Malaysia) Azrul Azmi	19	18	0	0	0	0	0	0	0	19	18	0
19	FW	(Malaysia) Stanley Bernard	16	14	1	0	2	2	0	0	0	18	16	1
20	FW	(Malaysia) Fazuan Abdullah	8	3	1	2	0	2	0	0	0	10	3	3
21	GK	(Malaysia) Amirul Abu Seman	6	4	0	1	1	0	0	0	0	7	5	0
23	FW	(Malaysia) S Sivaraj	20	6	0	2	0	0	0	0	0	22	6	0
24	MF	(Malaysia) Nur Hakim Adzhar	17	7	0	1	1	0	0	0	0	18	8	0
25	DF	(Malaysia) Ahmad Dashila Tajudin	23	21	0	2	2	0	0	0	0	25	23	0
27	MF	(Malaysia) Dzurrun Salam Ismail	0	0	0	0	0	0	0	0	0	0	0	0
28	FW	(Malaysia) Syafwan Syahlan	10	6	0	2	2	0	0	0	0	12	8	0
29	DF	(Malaysia) Aiman Syazwan Abdullah	17	15	0	0	0	0	0	0	0	17	15	0
–	–	Totals	-	–	14	–	–	5	–	–	0	–	–	19

=== Top scorers ===
Includes all competitive matches. The list is sorted by shirt number when total goals are equal.

Last updated on 17 July 2012

Position	Nation	Number	Name	Super League	FA Cup	Malaysia Cup	Total
FW	(Malaysia)	9	Afiq Azmi	4	1		5
MF	(Lebanon)	17	Zakaria Charara	4			4
FW	(Malaysia)	20	Fazuan Abdullah	1	2		3
MF	(Ghana)	15	Emmanuel Okine	2			2
MF	(Malaysia)	10	Khairul Anuar Shafie	1	1		2
MF	(Malaysia)	11	Pritam Singh	1			1
DF	(Malaysia)	16	Arman Fareez Mohd Ali		1		1
FW	(Malaysia)	19	Stanley Bernard	1			1
TOTALS				14	5		19
