= List of Malaysian football transfers 2013 =

This is a list of Malaysian football transfers for the 2013 first transfer window. Moves featuring Malaysia Super League, Malaysia Premier League and Malaysia FAM Cup club are listed.

== 2013 First Transfers ==
All clubs without a flag are Malaysian. Otherwise it will be stated.

=== Transfers ===
Date	Name	Moving from	Moving to	Fee (Note: Transfer fees are gathered from the various and may not be exact)
1 November 2012	(Malaysia) V. Kavi Chelvan	Harimau Muda A	Selangor	Free
1 November 2012	(Malaysia) Afiq Azmi	Kuala Lumpur	Selangor	Free
1 November 2012	(Liberia) Francis Doe	Terengganu	Selangor	Free
1 November 2012	(Malaysia) S. Kunanlan	Negeri Sembilan	Selangor	Free
19 November 2012	(Ghana) George Boateng	(England) Nottingham Forest	T–Team	Free
1 December 2012	(Republic of Ireland) Caleb Folan	(England) Birmingham City	T–Team	Free
1 January 2013	(Malaysia) Mahali Jasuli	Harimau Muda A	Selangor	Free
1 January 2013	(Malaysia) Aidil Zafuan	ATM	Johor Darul Ta'zim	Free
1 January 2013	(Malaysia) Zaquan Adha	ATM	Johor Darul Ta'zim	Free
1 January 2013	(Malaysia) Azmi Muslim	ATM	Johor Darul Ta'zim	Free
1 January 2013	(Malaysia) Safiq Rahim	Selangor	Johor Darul Ta'zim	Free
1 January 2013	(Malaysia) Muslim Ahmad	Terengganu	Johor Darul Ta'zim	Free
1 January 2013	(Malaysia) Nurul Azwan Roya	Kelantan	Johor Darul Ta'zim	Free
1 January 2013	(Malaysia) Norshahrul Idlan	Kelantan	Johor Darul Ta'zim	Free
1 January 2013	(Malaysia) Shukur Jusoh	Terengganu	Selangor	Free
1 January 2013	(Malaysia) Ramzul Zahini	Kelantan	Selangor	Free
1 January 2013	(Cameroon) Effa Owona	Negeri Sembilan	Terengganu	Free
1 January 2013	(Malaysia) Wan Azraie	Pahang	Terengganu	Free
1 January 2013	(Malaysia) Norhisham Hassan	MP Muar	Terengganu	Free
1 January 2013	(Malaysia) Syed Adney	Sabah	Terengganu	Free
1 January 2013	(Malaysia) Farderin Kadir	Felda United	Terengganu	Free
1 January 2013	(Malaysia) Shazlan Alias	Sime Darby	T–Team	Free
1 January 2013	(Malaysia) Rosdi Talib	T–Team	Terengganu	Free
1 January 2013	(Malaysia) Farizal Marlias	Negeri Sembilan	Perak	Free
1 January 2013	(Malaysia) Abdul Hadi Yahya	Terengganu	Perak	Free
1 January 2013	(Malaysia) Azlan Ismail	Kelantan	Perak	Free
1 January 2013	(Malaysia) Chanturu Suppiah	Kelantan	Perak	Free
1 January 2013	(Malaysia) Shukor Adan	Negeri Sembilan	ATM	Free
1 January 2013	(Malaysia) Amirul Hadi	Selangor	Pahang	Free
1 January 2013	(Malaysia) Razman Roslan	Selangor	Pahang	Free
1 January 2013	(Malaysia) Nasril Nourdin	Perak	Pahang	Free
1 January 2013	(Malaysia) Azidan Sarudin	Selangor	Pahang	Free
1 January 2013	(Malaysia) Aris Zaidi	Kelantan Youth	Kelantan	Free
1 January 2013	(Malaysia) Tuan Muhamad Faim	Kelantan Youth	Kelantan	Free
1 January 2013	(Malaysia) Khairul Izuan	Kelantan Youth	Kelantan	Free
1 January 2013	(Malaysia) Izuan Salahuddin	Harimau Muda A	Kelantan	Loan return
1 January 2013	(Malaysia) Faiz Subri	T–Team	Kelantan	Free
1 January 2013	(Malaysia) Zairo Anuar	T–Team	Kelantan	Free
1 January 2013	(Malaysia) K. Nanthakumar	Perak	Kelantan	Free
1 January 2013	(Malaysia) Norhadi Ubaidillah	UiTM	Kelantan	Free
1 January 2013	(Malaysia) Haris Safwan	Johor	Kelantan	Free
1 January 2013	(Croatia) Lek Kćira	(Iran) Shahin Bushehr	Kelantan	Free
1 January 2013	(Lebanon) Zakaria Charara	Kelantan	(Lebanon) Al-Nejmeh	Free
1 January 2013	(Croatia) Mijo Dadić	Kelantan	(Indonesia) Madura United	Free
1 January 2013	(Lebanon) Mohammed Ghaddar	Kelantan	Felda United	Free
1 January 2013	(Malaysia) Aliff Alias	T–Team	Perlis	Free
1 January 2013	(Malaysia) Badrul Hisani	T–Team	Perlis	Free
1 January 2013	(Malaysia) Shafuan Adli Shaari	Perlis	T–Team	Free
1 January 2013	(Malaysia) Atif Hanif	PKNS	Perlis	Free
1 January 2013	(Malaysia) Farouk Hashim	PKNS	Perlis	Free
1 January 2013	(Malaysia) Wan Mohd Alif Khairee	Tambun Tulang	Perlis	Free
1 January 2013	(Malaysia) Afizuddin Ali	Johor Darul Ta'zim	Perlis	Free
1 January 2013	(Malaysia) Afiq Akhmal Zunaidi	NS Betaria	Perlis	Free
1 January 2013	(Malaysia) P. Saran	NS Betaria	Perlis	Free
1 January 2013	(Malaysia) P. Ragunath	NS Betaria	Perlis	Free
1 January 2013	(Malaysia) Hafiz Abu Hassan	NS Betaria	Perlis	Free
1 January 2013	(Malaysia) Ammerrul Hisyam Amran	NS Betaria	Perlis	Free
1 January 2013	(Malaysia) Hanif Mohd Noor	Pos Malaysia	Perlis	Free
1 January 2013	(Malaysia) Shahruddin Ismail	Pos Malaysia	Perlis	Free
1 January 2013	(Malaysia) Romdhizat Jamian	MBJB	Perlis	Free
1 January 2013	(Malaysia) Nurfirdaus Roswanan	Kelantan Youth	Perlis	Free
1 January 2013	(Malaysia) Noraiman Talib	Kelantan Youth	Perlis	Free
1 January 2013	(Malaysia) Khairuddin Ramli	Kelantan Youth	Perlis	Free
1 January 2013	(Malaysia) Azrul Hafiz Amran	ATM	Perlis	Free
1 January 2013	(Malaysia) Ailim Fahmi	Terengganu	Perlis	Free
1 January 2013	(Malaysia) Khairul Ramadhan	Perlis	Terengganu	Free
1 January 2013	(Malaysia) Faizal Sumar	Selangor	Perlis	Free
1 January 2013	(Malaysia) Abdullah Am Ahmad	SDMS Kepala Batas	Perlis	Free
1 January 2013	(Malaysia) Khairul Asyraf Ramli	Harimau Muda B	Perlis	Free
1 January 2013	(Malaysia) Syafiq Abdul Samad	Perlis	SPA	Free
1 January 2013	(Malaysia) Khairool Anas Safri	Perlis	PBAPP	Free
1 January 2013	(Malaysia) Rozaidi Abdul Rahim	Kedah United	PBAPP	Free
1 January 2013	(Malaysia) Hairol Fazreen	Perlis	Penang	Free
1 January 2013	(Malaysia) Hafiz Abu Bakar	Perlis	Sime Darby	Free
1 January 2013	(Malaysia) Haziq Ahmad Fuad	Perlis	Sime Darby	Free

=== Loans ===
Date	Name	Moving from	Moving to
6 November 2012	(Spain) Dani Güiza	(Spain) Getafe	Johor Darul Ta'zim
1 December 2012	(Malaysia) Nizad Ayub	Kelantan	PKNS
1 December 2012	(Ghana) Emmanuel Okine	Kelantan	Perlis
1 December 2012	(Ghana) Denny Antwi	Kelantan	Perlis

=== Unattached Players ===
Date	Name	Moving from
1 December 2012	(Malaysia) Nizam Daud	Perlis
1 December 2012	(Malaysia) Firdaus Yusoff	Perlis
1 December 2012	(Malaysia) Afandi Zamzam	Perlis
1 December 2012	(Malaysia) Faqeem Aswad Mohd Fauzi	Perlis
1 December 2012	(Malaysia) Eqbal Harizam	Perlis
1 December 2012	(Malaysia) Hafiz Deli	Perlis
1 December 2012	(Malaysia) Elfie Elyaz Harizam	Perlis
1 December 2012	(Malaysia) L. Phul Sakh	Perlis
1 December 2012	(Sierra Leone) Mahmadu Alphajor Bah	Perlis
1 December 2012	(Sierra Leone) Lamin Conteh	Perlis
