= Bobirjon Akbarov =

Uzbek footballer

Personal information
- Full name: Bobirjon Akbarov
- Date of birth: 14 February 1989 (age 37)
- Place of birth: Andijon, Uzbekistan
- Height: 1.86 m (6 ft 1 in)
- Position: Centre back

Team information
- Current team: Kokand
- Number: 3

Senior career*
| Years | Team | Apps | (Gls) |
| 2013 | Guliston | 23 | (2) |
| 2014 | Bunyodkor | 3 | (0) |
| 2014–2015 | Navbahor | 37 | (0) |
| 2016 | Andijon | 24 | (0) |
| 2017–2018 | Kuala Lumpur | 41 | (3) |
| 2019 | Andijon | 21 | (0) |
| 2020–2022 | Kokand | 25 | (2) |
| 2022–2023 | FC Surkhon Termez | 25 | (2) |
| 2023– | FK Kokand 1912 | 68 | (5) |
- * Club domestic league appearances and goals as of 7 February 2024 @ 14:02(AEST)

Bobirjon Akbarov (Uzbek Cyrillic: Бобиржон Акбаров; born 14 February 1989) is an Uzbek footballer who plays for Kokand as a centre-back.

== Career statistics ==
As of 28 July 2018

=== Club ===
| Club | Season | League | | Cup | | League Cup | | Continental | | Total | |
| Club | Season | Apps | Goals | Apps | Goals | Apps | Goals | Apps | Goals | Apps | Goals |
|---|---|---|---|---|---|---|---|---|---|---|---|
| Kuala Lumpur | 2017 | 21 | 1 | 1 | 0 | 6 | 0 | – | – | 28 | 1 |
| Kuala Lumpur | 2018 | 20 | 2 | 3 | 0 | 0 | 0 | 0 | 0 | 23 | 2 |
| Kuala Lumpur | Total | 41 | 3 | 4 | 0 | 6 | 0 | 0 | 0 | 51 | 3 |
| Career total | | 0 | 0 | 0 | 0 | 0 | 0 | 0 | 0 | 0 | 0 |
