= Kamarul Effandi =

Malaysian footballer (born 1987)

Personal information
- Full name: Kamarul Effandi bin Abdul Rahim
- Date of birth: 12 April 1987 (age 39)
- Place of birth: Perak, Malaysia
- Height: 1.78 m (5 ft 10 in)
- Position: Goalkeeper

Team information
- Current team: BRM FC
- Number: 28

Youth career
- 2005–2007: Perak U-21

Senior career*
Years	Team	Apps	(Gls)
2008–2012	Perak	30	(0)
2012–2016	Sime Darby	28	(0)
2017–2019	Kuala Lumpur	13	(0)
2020–2021	Langkawi City	2	(0)
2021–2023	BRM FC	7	(0)
- * Club domestic league appearances and goals as of 1 May 2020

Kamarul Effandi bin Abdul Rahim (born 12 April 1987) is a Malaysian professional football player who plays for BRM FC as a goalkeeper.

== Club career ==
=== Early career ===
Born in Perak, Malaysia, Kamarul started his career with Perak youth team. He has been promoted to Perak first team for the 2008 season after helping the Perak youth team to win the Malaysia President Cup in 2007.

Kamarul also represented the state team in Sukma Games 2010. He was the Perak second choice goalkeeper, previously as understudy to Megat Amir Faisal and then deputising for Nasril Nourdin when Megat left Perak after 2010 season. He was released by Perak, together with Nasril, at the end of the 2012 season. Kamarul joined Sime Darby along with four other former Perak players for the 2013 season.

After three seasons with Sime Darby, he joined Malaysia Premier League side Kuala Lumpur FA in 2017. With Kuala Lumpur, he helped the team win the 2017 Malaysia Premier League title, and promotion to Malaysia Super League. He was Kuala Lumpur's main goalkeeper for the 2018 Malaysia Super League season, and were criticized for howlers that cost the team in the early stages of the league. But Kamarul later improved with several good performances, including keeping a clean sheet in the win over defending champions Johor Darul Ta'zim F.C.

== Career statistics ==
As of 9 June 2017.

Club	Season	League		Cup (Note: The Malaysia FA Cup)		League Cup (Note: The Malaysia Cup)		Continental		Total	
Club	Season	Apps	Goals	Apps	Goals	Apps	Goals	Apps	Goals	Apps	Goals
Kuala Lumpur	2017	8	0	0	0	3	0	–		11	0
Kuala Lumpur	2018	5	0	1	0	0	0	–		6	0
Kuala Lumpur	Total	13	0	1	0	3	0	0	0	17	0
Career total		0	0	0	0	0	0	0	0	0	0

== International career ==
Kamarul was also called to the Malaysia U-23 centralised training under K. Rajagopal in 2009. However Kamarul never made any appearances at international level.
