= 2018 Kuala Lumpur FA season =

Kuala Lumpur
2018 season
- President: Adnan Md Ikhsan
- Head Coach: Fábio Magrão
- Stadium: KLFA Stadium
- Malaysia Super League: 10th
- Malaysia FA Cup: Quarter-finals
- Malaysia Cup: Group stage
- Top goalscorer: League: Guilherme (13); All: Guilherme (25)
Home colours	Away colours

The 2018 season was Kuala Lumpur's 40th season in competitive season and the 1st season in Malaysia Super League since being promoted after winning the 2017 Malaysia Premier League.

== Players ==
=== First team squad ===
As of 9 November 2017.

No.	Name	Nat	Position	Since	Date of birth (age)	Signed from
Goalkeepers
1	Kamarul Effandi	(Malaysia)	GK	2017	12 April 1987 (age 38)	(Malaysia) Sime Darby
18	Solehin Mamat	(Malaysia)	GK	2017	24 March 1996 (age 29)	(Malaysia) Melaka United
22	Sharbinee Allawee	(Malaysia)	GK	2018	7 December 1986 (age 39)	(Malaysia) Terengganu
29	Khatul Anuar	(Malaysia)	GK	2017	2 April 1997 (age 28)	Youth
Defenders
2	Farid Ramli	(Malaysia)	LB / LM	2018	28 April 1987 (age 38)	(Malaysia) Felda United
3	Saifulnizam Miswan	(Malaysia)	CB / LB / RB	2018	3 March 1981 (age 44)	(Malaysia) Pahang
4	Zaiful Abdul Hakim	(Malaysia)	LB / LM	2016	1 March 1994 (age 31)	Youth
12	Bobirjon Akbarov	(Uzbekistan)	CB	2017	14 February 1988 (age 37)	(Uzbekistan) Andijon
16	Achmad Jufriyanto	(Indonesia)	CB / DM	2018	7 February 1987 (age 38)	(Indonesia) Persib Bandung
19	Firdaus Faudzi	(Malaysia)	RB / RM	2018	2 August 1987 (age 38)	(Malaysia) Terengganu
24	Hisyamudin Sha'ari	(Malaysia)	CB / DM	2017	5 September 1987 (age 38)	(Malaysia) Perak
25	Azmeer Yusof	(Malaysia)	CB / LB	2017	25 May 1990 (age 35)	(Malaysia) Kedah
26	Hazwan Rahman	(Malaysia)	RB	2017	16 July 1990 (age 35)	(Malaysia) Petaling Jaya Rangers
27	Hafiz Johar	(Malaysia)	RB / LB	2016	14 September 1994 (age 31)	(Malaysia) Selangor youth
Midfielders
5	Hardee Samsuri	(Malaysia)	CM / AM	2016	4 June 1994 (age 31)	(Malaysia) Selangor youth
6	Syazwan Andik	(Malaysia)	LB / LW	2018	4 August 1996 (age 29)	(Malaysia) Johor Darul Ta'zim II
7	Juninho	(Brazil)	AM / LW	2018	28 May 1989 (age 36)	(Brazil) Boa
11	Ashri Chuchu	(Malaysia)	LM / LW	2017	27 February 1991 (age 34)	(Malaysia) Sarawak
14	Syafwan Syahlan	(Malaysia)	RW / LW	2016	15 January 1993 (age 33)	(Malaysia) Harimau Muda A
17	Irfan Zakaria	(Malaysia)	DM	2016	4 June 1995 (age 30)	(Malaysia) Harimau Muda
20	Zhafri Yahya	(Malaysia)	CM / DM	2016	25 September 1994 (age 31)	(Malaysia) Selangor youth
21	Na'im Nazmi	(Malaysia)	LB / LW	2016	19 November 1993 (age 32)	(Malaysia) Johor Darul Ta'zim II
28	Paulo Josué	(Brazil)	LM / ST	2017	13 March 1989 (age 36)	(Brazil) Votuporanguense
30	Amirul Ikmal Hafiz	(Malaysia)	DM	2017	17 January 1996 (age 30)	(Malaysia) Johor Darul Ta'zim II
Forwards
8	Zaquan Adha	(Malaysia)	ST	2018	3 August 1987 (age 38)	(Malaysia) Perak
9	Ibrahim Syaihul	(Malaysia)	ST	2016	25 January 1994 (age 32)	(Malaysia) Felcra
10	Guilherme de Paula	(Brazil)	ST	2017	19 November 1986 (age 39)	(Malaysia) PDRM
13	Afiq Razali	(Malaysia)	SS	2018	24 November 1996 (age 29)	Youth
23	Indra Putra Mahayuddin (C)	(Malaysia)	ST / LW / RW	2018	2 September 1981 (age 44)	(Malaysia) Kelantan

== Transfers ==
=== 1st leg ===
In: Note: Flags indicate national team as defined under FIFA eligibility rules; some limited exceptions apply. Players may hold more than one non-FIFA nationality.

No.	Pos.	Nation	Player
3	DF	MAS	Saifulnizam Miswan (from Pahang)
6	MF	MAS	Syazwan Andik (from Johor Darul Ta'zim II)
7	MF	BRA	Juninho (from (Brazil) Boa)
14	FW	MAS	Zaquan Adha (from Perak)
16	DF	IDN	Achmad Jufriyanto (from (Indonesia) Persib Bandung)
19	DF	MAS	Firdaus Faudzi (from Terengganu)
23	MF	MAS	Indra Putra Mahayuddin (from Kelantan)
2	DF	MAS	Farid Ramli (from Felda United)

Out: Note: Flags indicate national team as defined under FIFA eligibility rules; some limited exceptions apply. Players may hold more than one non-FIFA nationality.

No.	Pos.	Nation	Player
3	DF	MAS	Naufal Naim (unattached)
7	MF	ARG	Nicolas Dul (unattached)
9	FW	MAS	Arif Anwar (to Petaling Jaya Rangers)
13	MF	MAS	Syazmin Firdaus (unattached)
15	MF	MLI	Modibo Konté (unattached, previously on loan at Perlis)
19	FW	MAS	Manaf Mamat (to Marcerra United)
21	DF	MAS	Helmi Remeli (to Marcerra United)
22	GK	MAS	Remezey Che Ros (to Pahang)
30	DF	MAS	Farid Ramli (loan return to Felda United)
—	MF	MAS	Tam Sheang Tsung (loan return to Melaka United)

=== 2nd leg ===
In: Note: Flags indicate national team as defined under FIFA eligibility rules; some limited exceptions apply. Players may hold more than one non-FIFA nationality.

No.	Pos.	Nation	Player
22	GK	MAS	Sharbinee Allawee (from Terengganu)

== Competitions ==
=== Malaysia Super League ===
Date	Opponents	H / A	Result F–A	Scorers	Attendance	League position
4 February 2018	Selangor	H	0–2			12th
7 February 2018	Negeri Sembilan	A	0–2			12th
10 February 2018	Johor Darul Ta'zim	H	1–0	Paulo Josué 45+1'		10th
25 February 2018	PKNP	A	1–2	Ganiesh 81' (o.g.)		12th
10 March 2018	Kedah	H	4–3	Zaquan 3', Guilherme 62', Paulo Josué 82', Ashri 90+6'		9th
15 April 2018	Pahang	H	2–2	Guilherme 10', Indra 39'		8th
29 April 2018	Perak	A	0–2			10th
2 May 2018	PKNS	H	2–1	Paulo Josué 10', Guilherme 45+2'		8th
5 May 2018	Kelantan	A	2–4	Indra 80', Zhafri 90+2'		8th
13 May 2018	PKNS	A	2–3	Akbarov 6', Guilherme 90+3'		9th
22 May 2018	Kelantan	H	5–1	Guilherme (2) 4', 23', Paulo Josué 10', Ashri 78', Juninho 86'		9th
26 May 2018	Pahang	A	0–4			9th
2 June 2018	Terengganu	H	3–0	Zhafri 45+2', Guilherme 46', Paulo Josué 81'		7th
5 June 2018	Melaka United	H	3–4	Paulo Josué 43', Guilherme (2) 48', 71'		9th
9 June 2018	Melaka United	A	4–2	Indra (2) 30', 84', Zaquan 56', Guilherme 64'		7th
20 June 2018	Kedah	A	2–3	Guilherme 45', Syafwan 88'		9th
27 June 2018	PKNP	H	1–1	Indra 23'		8th
10 July 2018	Terengganu	A	1–3	Guilherme 34'		9th
15 July 2018	Selangor	H	3–3	Zhafri 6', Hafiz 20', Paulo Josué 47'		10th
18 July 2018	Perak	H	1–5	Guilherme 46'		10th
22 July 2018	Negeri Sembilan	H	2–1	Akbarov 43', Indra Putra 88'		8th
28 July 2018	Johor Darul Ta'zim	A	0–2			10th

Pos	Team	Pld	W	D	L	GF	GA	GD	Pts	Qualification or relegation
8	Selangor	22	7	6	9	35	39	−4	27	
9	PKNP	22	7	4	11	25	31	−6	25	
10	Kuala Lumpur	22	7	3	12	39	51	−12	24	
11	Kelantan (R)	22	5	3	14	20	43	−23	18	Relegation to the Premier League
12	Negeri Sembilan (R)	22	4	3	15	27	47	−20	15	Relegation to the Premier League

Source: FAM, FMLLP
Rules for classification: 1) Points; 2) Goal difference; 3) Number of goals scored.
(R) Relegated

=== Malaysia FA Cup ===
Date	Round	Opponents	H / A	Result F–A	Scorers	Attendance
3 March 2018	Round 2	Kuching	H	4–0	Guilherme (3) 21', 65', 90+1', Paulo Josué 49'	
17 March 2018	Round 3	Melaka United	A	1–1 (a.e.t.) (3–1p)	Guilherme 31'	
7 April 2018	Quarter-final; First leg	Selangor	H	0–3		
21 April 2018	Quarter-final; Second leg	Selangor	A	0–3 (a.e.t.) (8–7p)	Zaquan Adha15' Paulo Josué 45+2' Syazwan Andik 54'	

=== Malaysia Cup ===
Date	Opponents	H / A	Result F–A	Scorers	Attendance	Group position
4 August 2018	Terengganu	H	1–5	Zaquan 85'		4th
12 August 2018	Felcra	A	1–4	Guilherme (4) 6', 73', 85', 90'		2nd
19 August 2018	Perak	H	0–2			3rd
25 August 2018	Perak	A	1–0			3rd
1 September 2018	Felcra	H	3–4			4th
15 September 2018	Terengganu	A	2–3			4th

Pos	Team	Pld	W	D	L	GF	GA	GD	Pts	Qualification	TER	PRK	FLC	KL
1	Terengganu	6	3	1	2	18	12	+6	10	Advance to knockout stage	—	1–2	2–2	2–3
2	Perak	6	3	1	2	9	7	+2	10	Advance to knockout stage	3–4	—	0–0	1–0
3	Felcra	6	2	2	2	10	14	−4	8		1–4	2–1	—	1–4
4	Kuala Lumpur	6	2	0	4	11	15	−4	6		1–5	0–2	3–4	—

Updated to match(es) played on 15 September 2018. Source: FAM FMLLP

== Squad appearances statistics ==
As of 15 September 2018

No.	Pos.	Name	League	FA Cup	League Cup	Total
1	GK	(Malaysia) Kamarul Effandi	5	1	0	6
2	DF	(Malaysia) Farid Ramli	1+3	0	1+1	2+4
3	DF	(Malaysia) Saifulnizam Miswan	7+2	0	5	12+2
4	DF	(Malaysia) Zaiful Abdul Hakim	0+2	0+2	1+2	1+6
5	MF	(Malaysia) Hardee Samsuri	0	0	0+1	0+1
6	MF	(Malaysia) Syazwan Andik	19+1	4	1	24+1
7	MF	(Brazil) Juninho	7+4	1	0	8+4
8	FW	(Malaysia) Zaquan Adha	10+4	4	6	20+4
9	FW	(Malaysia) Ibrahim Syaihul	0+2	0	0	0+2
10	FW	(Brazil) Guilherme de Paula	21	3	6	32
11	MF	(Malaysia) Ashri Chuchu	8+11	2+2	3+1	13+14
12	FW	(Uzbekistan) Bobirjon Akbarov	19+1	3	6	28+1
13	FW	(Malaysia) Afiq Razali	0+1	0	2+3	2+4
14	MF	(Malaysia) Syafwan Syahlan	0+6	0	0	0+6
16	DF	(Indonesia) Achmad Jufriyanto	12+5	4	3+2	19+7
17	MF	(Malaysia) Irfan Zakaria	17+2	4	2	23+2
18	GK	(Malaysia) Solehin Mamat	5	2	0	7
19	DF	(Malaysia) Firdaus Faudzi	19	4	0+1	23+1
20	MF	(Malaysia) Zhafri Yahya	15+4	1+2	2	18+6
21	MF	(Malaysia) Na'im Nazmi	0	0	0	0
22	GK	(Malaysia) Sharbinee Allawee	10	0	6	16
23	FW	(Malaysia) Indra Putra Mahayuddin	19	4	5+1	28+1
24	DF	(Malaysia) Hisyamudin Sha'ari	14+1	2	3+2	19+3
25	DF	(Malaysia) Azmeer Yusof	5+2	0	3	8+2
26	DF	(Malaysia) Hazwan Rahman	0	0	0	0
27	DF	(Malaysia) Hafiz Johar	9+6	0+2	4+1	13+9
28	MF	(Brazil) Paulo Josué	21	4	5	30
29	GK	(Malaysia) Khatul Anuar	2	1+1	0	3+1
30	MF	(Malaysia) Amirul Ikmal Hafiz	0	0	0	0
33	DF	(Malaysia) Tan Yun Hong	0	0	0+1	0+1
34	MF	(Malaysia) Azman Chuchu	0	0	1+1	1+1

== Squad goals statistics ==
As of 15 September 2018

No.	Pos.	Name	League	FA Cup	League Cup	Total
1	GK	(Malaysia) Kamarul Effandi	0	0	0	0
2	DF	(Malaysia) Farid Ramli	0	0	0	0
3	DF	(Malaysia) Saifulnizam Miswan	0	0	0	0
4	DF	(Malaysia) Zaiful Abdul Hakim	0	0	0	0
5	MF	(Malaysia) Hardee Samsuri	0	0	0	0
6	MF	(Malaysia) Syazwan Andik	0	1	0	1
7	MF	(Brazil) Juninho	1	0	0	1
8	FW	(Malaysia) Zaquan Adha	2	1	1	4
9	FW	(Malaysia) Ibrahim Syaihul	0	0	0	0
10	FW	(Brazil) Guilherme de Paula	13	4	8	25
11	MF	(Malaysia) Ashri Chuchu	2	0	0	2
12	DF	(Uzbekistan) Bobirjon Akbarov	2	0	0	2
13	FW	(Malaysia) Afiq Razali	0	0	0	0
14	MF	(Malaysia) Syafwan Syahlan	1	0	0	1
16	DF	(Indonesia) Achmad Jufriyanto	0	0	0	0
17	MF	(Malaysia) Irfan Zakaria	0	0	0	0
18	GK	(Malaysia) Solehin Mamat	0	0	0	0
19	DF	(Malaysia) Firdaus Faudzi	0	0	0	0
20	MF	(Malaysia) Zhafri Yahya	3	0	0	3
21	MF	(Malaysia) Na'im Nazmi	0	0	0	0
22	GK	(Malaysia) Sharbinee Allawee	0	0	0	0
23	FW	(Malaysia) Indra Putra Mahayuddin	6	0	0	6
24	DF	(Malaysia) Hisyamudin Sha'ari	0	0	0	0
25	DF	(Malaysia) Azmeer Yusof	0	0	0	0
26	DF	(Malaysia) Hazwan Rahman	0	0	0	0
27	DF	(Malaysia) Hafiz Johar	1	0	0	1
28	MF	(Brazil) Paulo Josué	7	2	1	10
29	GK	(Malaysia) Khatul Anuar	0	0	0	0
30	MF	(Malaysia) Amirul Ikmal Hafiz	0	0	0	0

== Clean sheets ==
No.	Pos.	Name	League	FA Cup	League Cup	Total
1	GK	(Malaysia) Kamarul Effandi	1	0	0	1
18	GK	(Malaysia) Solehin Mamat	0	1	0	1
22	GK	(Malaysia) Sharbinee Allawee	1	0	0	1
29	GK	(Malaysia) Khatul Anuar	0	0	0	0
