= Mohd Fareez Asmawi =

Malaysian footballer

Personal information
- Full name: Mohd Fareez bin Asmawi
- Date of birth: 17 August 1989 (age 37)
- Place of birth: Selangor, Malaysia
- Position: Midfielder

Youth career
- 2008–: Selangor FA

Senior career*
Years	Team	Apps	(Gls)
2009–2010	Selangor FA	4	(0)
- * Club domestic league appearances and goals as of 13 January 2009

Mohd Fareez Asmawi (born 17 August 1989) is a Malaysian footballer who is a midfielder recently played for Selangor FA in Malaysian Super League. He also the member of Selangor President Cup's team.

Fareez made his Malaysian League debut as substitution for Muhd Zameer Zainun in 2009 Malaysian Charity Shield against Kedah FA which Selangor won 4–1.
