= Juninho (footballer, born May 1989) =

Brazilian footballer

Personal information
- Full name: Junior Aparecido Guimaro de Souza
- Date of birth: 28 May 1989 (age 37)
- Place of birth: São Paulo, Brazil
- Height: 1.74 m (5 ft 9 in)
- Position: Winger

Youth career
- 2004–2005: Marília
- 2006–2008: São Paulo

Senior career*
Years	Team	Apps	(Gls)
2009	São Paulo	0	(0)
2010–2011	Cuiabá	1	(0)
2011–2012	Botoșani	9	(2)
2012	→ BBCU (loan)	7	(6)
2012–2013	Muangthong United	0	(0)
2013	→ Phuket (loan)	18	(10)
2013	→ TOT (loan)	9	(2)
2014	Selangor	7	(1)
2015	TOT	4	(0)
2015	Avaí	4	(0)
2016	Sarawak	20	(7)
2017	Boa	1	(0)
2018	Kuala Lumpur	11	(1)
2019	Pelotas	0	(0)

International career
2015–2016	Timor-Leste	10	(0)
- * Club domestic league appearances and goals as of July 28, 2018

Júnior Aparecido Guimaro de Souza (born 28 May 1989), simply known as Juninho, is a Brazilian footballer who plays as a winger.

== Club career ==
=== São Paulo ===
Juninho began his career with São Paulo at the age of 16. He signed a contract at seventeen and led the São Paulo youth squad to Copa de Juvenil glory.

=== Cuiabá ===
After with São Paulo, he moved to Cuiabá Esporte Clube in Campeonato Brasileiro Série C. Juninho scored his first goal on 18 May 2010 in a home match to Rio Branco.

=== Botoșani ===
On 25 January 2012, Juninho completed his move to Romanian side FC Botoșani signing a one-year deal. Before start his injury, he just made 9 appearances and scored two goals in Liga I.

==== BBCU (loan) ====
Juninho made a surprise move to BBCU F.C. at Thai Premier League on 4 June 2012 in a six-month contract on loan, where he quickly gained first team experience in Southeast Asia Club at Thailand. On 24 May Juninho scored a chip shot with his right foot in a 3–1 win against Army United F.C. in a Thai Premier League match. At the end of the season Juninho just made with 7 appearances and 6 goals.

=== Muangthong United ===
Juninho joined Muangthong United club at Thai Premier League but was then loaned out to Phuket FC at Thai Division 1 League in 2013. He made his debut in a 3–2 away victory against Sriracha F.C., and scored his first goal for the team against Krabi F.C. in a 2–2 home draw on 5 March 2013. Juninho went on to score 7 goals in his first season and made 18 appearances with Phuket FC before he joined TOT S.C. in Thai division 1 half season on loan. Juninho has completely finished 2013 season with 28 appearances and 11 goals and Thai Division 1 League.

=== Selangor ===
Juninho joined Malaysia Super League club, Selangor signing a two-year deal.

== International career ==
Born in Brazil, Juninho played for Timor-Leste national football team between 2015 and 2016.

On 19 January 2017, the Asian Football Confederation declared Juninho and eleven other Brazilian men's footballers ineligible to represent Timor Leste.

== Career statistics ==
=== Club ===
As of 28 July 2018.

Appearances and goals by club, season and competition
Club	Season	League			Cup		League Cup		Continental		Total	
Club	Season	Division	Apps	Goals	Apps	Goals	Apps	Goals	Apps	Goals	Apps	Goals
Sarawak	2016	Malaysia Super League	20	7	1	0	0	0	–		21	7
Sarawak	Total		20	7	1	0	0	0	0	0	21	7
Kuala Lumpur	2018	Malaysia Super League	11	1	1	0	0	0	–		12	1
Kuala Lumpur	Total		11	1	1	0	0	0	0	0	12	1
Career total			0	0	0	0	0	0	0	0	0	0
