= 2017 Kuala Lumpur FA season =

Kuala Lumpur
2017 season
- President: Adnan Md Ikhsan
- Manager: Mohd Hisamudin Yahaya
- Head Coach: Wanderley Junior (until 28 February 2017); Fábio Magrão (from 1 March 2017)
- Stadium: Selayang Stadium
- Liga Premier: Champions (promoted)
- Piala FA: Round of 32
- Piala Malaysia: Group stage
- Top goalscorer: League: Guilherme (27 goals); All: Guilherme (30 goals)
- Highest home attendance: 1,399 vs Terengganu (21 July 2017)
- Lowest home attendance: 119 vs PKNS (9 September 2017)
- Average home league attendance: 615
Home colours	Away colours

The 2017 season was Kuala Lumpur's 39th in competitive season.

== Squad information ==
=== First team squad ===
As of 27 October 2017.

No	Name	Nat	Position	Since	Date of birth (age)	Signed from	Games	Goals
Goalkeepers
1	Kamarul Effandi	(Malaysia)	GK	2017	12 April 1987 (age 39)	(Malaysia) Sime Darby	8	0
18	Solehin Mamat	(Malaysia)	GK	2017	24 March 1996 (age 30)	(Malaysia) Melaka United	7	0
22	Remezey Che Ros	(Malaysia)	GK	2017	6 September 1982 (age 44)	(Malaysia) PKNS	7	0
31	Khatul Anuar ^{U21}	(Malaysia)	GK	2017	2 April 1997 (age 29)	Youth	0	0
Defenders
3	Naufal Naim	(Malaysia)	RB / RM	2014	21 October 1992 (age 33)		0	0
4	Zaiful Abdul Hakim	(Malaysia)	LB / LWB / RB	2016	1 March 1994 (age 32)	(Malaysia) Selangor U21	17	0
12	Bobirjon Akbarov	(Uzbekistan)	CB	2017	14 February 1989 (age 37)	(Uzbekistan) FC Andijon	21	1
21	Helmi Remeli (captain)	(Malaysia)	CB / DMC	2016	24 March 1985 (age 41)	(Malaysia) Terengganu	17	1
24	Hisyamudin Sha'ari (vice-captain)	(Malaysia)	CB / DMC	2017	5 September 1987 (age 39)	(Malaysia) Perak TBG	12	0
25	Azmeer Yusof (vice-captain)	(Malaysia)	CB / LB	2017	25 May 1990 (age 36)	(Malaysia) Kedah	16	0
26	Hazwan Rahman	(Malaysia)	RB	2017	16 July 1990 (age 36)	(Malaysia) Petaling Jaya Rangers	4	0
27	Hafiz Johar	(Malaysia)	RB / LB	2016	14 September 1994 (age 31)	(Malaysia) Selangor U21	17	3
30	Farid Ramli	(Malaysia)	LB	2017	28 April 1987 (age 39)	(Malaysia) FELDA United	2	0
Midfielders
5	Hardee Samsuri	(Malaysia)	CM / AM	2016	4 June 1994 (age 32)	(Malaysia) Selangor U21	8	0
7	Nicolas Dul	(Argentina)	CM	2017	5 February 1988 (age 38)	(Argentina) Chaco For Ever	19	1
8	**Azidan Sarudin**	(Malaysia)	CM	2016	31 May 1986 (age 40)	(Malaysia) Pahang	6	0
11	Ashri Chuchu	(Malaysia)	LM / LW	2017	27 February 1991 (age 35)	(Malaysia) Sarawak	16	1
13	Syazmin Firdaus	(Malaysia)	LM / LW	2016	15 January 1988 (age 38)	(Malaysia) DRB-Hicom	0	0
15	**Modibo Konté**	(Mali)	AM / DM	2015	13 April 1994 (age 32)	(Mali) CO de Bamako	11	1
17	Irfan Zakaria	(Malaysia)	DM	2016	4 June 1995 (age 31)	(Malaysia) Harimau Muda	15	0
20	Zhafri Yahya	(Malaysia)	CM / DM	2016	25 September 1994 (age 31)	(Malaysia) Selangor U21	22	1
23	Na'im Nazmi	(Malaysia)	LM / LW	2016	19 November 1993 (age 32)	(Malaysia) Johor Darul Ta'zim II	19	1
28	Paulo Josué	(Brazil)	LM	2017	13 March 1989 (age 37)	(Brazil) Votuporanguense	9	6
—	Tam Sheang Tsung	(Malaysia)	LW / RM	2017	24 May 1995 (age 31)	(Malaysia) Melaka United	0	0
—	Amirul Ikmal Hafiz ^{U21}	(Malaysia)	DM	2017	17 January 1996 (age 30)	(Malaysia) Johor Darul Ta'zim II	0	0
Forwards
6	Ibrahim Syaihul	(Malaysia)	ST	2016	25 January 1994 (age 32)	(Malaysia) FELCRA	10	2
9	Arif Anwar	(Malaysia)	ST	2016	14 March 1995 (age 31)	(Malaysia) Harimau Muda	4	0
10	Guilherme	(Brazil)	ST	2017	9 November 1986 (age 39)	(Malaysia) PDRM	22	27
19	Manaf Mamat (vice-captain)	(Malaysia)	ST	2017	8 April 1987 (age 39)	(Malaysia) Kelantan	16	1
—	Syafwan Syahlan	(Malaysia)	ST	2016	15 January 1993 (age 33)	(Malaysia) Harimau Muda A	0	0

* Player names in bold denotes player that left mid-season
* U21=Under-21 player
* Appearances and goals counted for the domestic league only

== Pre-season ==
23 December 2016 Friendly	Sime Darby (Kuala Lumpur)	1–2	Kuala Lumpur	Bukit Jelutong, Selangor
20:30 UTC+8	Zulfahmi	Report	Ibrahim; Arif	Stadium: Sime Darby Training Ground

27 December 2016 Friendly	Kuala Lumpur	5–1	(Kuala Lumpur) FELCRA	Kuala Lumpur
17:00 UTC+8	Hafiz 0' (pen.), 0'; Hardee; Zhafri; Babur		Fazliata (pen.)	Stadium: Universiti Malaya Arena

30 December 2016 Friendly	FELDA United (Kuala Lumpur)	0–0	Kuala Lumpur	Kuala Lumpur
20:30 UTC+8				Stadium: Universiti Malaya Arena

4 January 2017 Friendly	PKNS (Selangor)	1–0	Kuala Lumpur	Kelana Jaya, Selangor
20:45 UTC+8	Espíndola			Stadium: PKNS Sports Complex

7 January 2017 Friendly	Pahang	3–2	Kuala Lumpur	Temerloh, Pahang
20:45 UTC+8	Afif; Wan Zaharulnizam; Sumareh	Report	Manaf; Ibrahim	Stadium: Temerloh Mini Stadium

14 January 2017 Friendly	Selangor	0–1	Kuala Lumpur	Shah Alam, Selangor
21:00 UTC+8			Chamorro	Stadium: SUK

== Competitions ==
=== Liga Premier ===
==== League table ====
Pos	Team	Pld	W	D	L	GF	GA	GD	Pts	Promotion, qualification or relegation
1	Kuala Lumpur	22	15	2	5	47	24	+23	47	Promotion to Super League
2	Terengganu	22	15	2	5	42	27	+15	47	Promotion to Super League
3	PKNP	22	14	4	4	41	23	+18	46	Promotion to Super League
4	Johor Darul Ta'zim II	22	11	8	3	47	27	+20	41	
5	Negeri Sembilan	22	11	8	3	37	24	+13	41	Promotion to Super League

Source: FAM, FMLLP
Rules for classification: 1) Points; 2) Goal difference; 3) Number of goals scored.

==== Results summary ====
Overall								Home						Away					
Pld	W	D	L	GF	GA	GD	Pts	W	D	L	GF	GA	GD	W	D	L	GF	GA	GD
22	15	2	5	47	24	+23	47	9	1	1	22	10	+12	6	1	4	25	14	+11

Last updated: 27 October 2017.
Source: FAM

==== Results by matchday ====
Matchday	1	2	3	4	5	6	7	8	9	10	11	12	13	14	15	16	17	18	19	20	21	22
Result	W	W	D	D	L	L	W	L	W	W	W	W	W	W	W	W	L	W	W	W	W	L
Ground	H	A	H	A	H	A	H	A	H	A	H	A	H	A	H	A	H	A	H	A	H	A
Position	3	1	1	3	4	7	6	8	7	5	4	4	3	2	1	1	3	1	1	1	1	1

Updated to match(es) played on 27 October 2017. Source: Competitions
A = Away; H = Home; W = Win; D = Draw; L = Loss

==== Matches ====
Win Draw Loss

20 January 2017 1	Kuala Lumpur	2–1	Johor Darul Ta'zim II	Selayang, Selangor
21:00 UTC+8	Akbarov 20'; Ibrahim 31'	Report	Fernández 4'	Stadium: Selayang Stadium; Attendance: 691; Referee: S. Sittharanjanan

26 January 2017 2	Sabah	1–2	Kuala Lumpur	Kota Kinabalu, Sabah
20:15 UTC+8	Čerina 20'	Report	Nicolás 30'; Guilherme 88'	Stadium: Likas Stadium; Attendance: 3,000; Referee: Tiong Eng Tai

3 February 2017 3	Kuala Lumpur	1–1	(Selangor) UiTM	Selayang, Selangor
21:00 UTC+8	Guilherme 80'	Report	Akanni-Sunday 50'	Stadium: Selayang Stadium; Attendance: 375; Referee: Muhammad Nasruddin Tamrin

10 February 2017 4	PKNP (Perak)	0–0	Kuala Lumpur	Ipoh, Perak
21:00 UTC+8		Report		Stadium: Perak Stadium; Attendance: 1,582; Referee: Razlan Jeffri Ali

18 February 2017 5	Kuala Lumpur	0–2	PDRM	Selayang, Selangor
21:00 UTC+8		Report	Bakary 53'; Nabil 90+3'	Stadium: Selayang Stadium; Attendance: 373; Referee: Fitri Maskon

24 February 2017 6	Terengganu	2–1	Kuala Lumpur	Kuala Terengganu, Terengganu
21:00 UTC+8	Falcone 5'; Turaev 53'	Report	Na'im Nazmi 36'	Stadium: Sultan Ismail Nasiruddin Shah Stadium; Attendance: 3,200; Referee: Ku Alauddin Ku Muhammad

28 February 2017 7	Kuala Lumpur	2–1	(Pahang) Kuantan	Selayang, Selangor
21:00 UTC+8	Guilherme 30'; Helmi 89'	Report	Woon-sub 7'	Stadium: Selayang Stadium; Attendance: 250; Referee: Khairul Azuan Kidam

3 March 2017 8	Negeri Sembilan	2–1	Kuala Lumpur	Paroi, Negeri Sembilan
21:00 UTC+8	Khairul Anwar 8'; Šimić 57'	Report	Guilherme 90+1'	Stadium: Tuanku Abdul Rahman Stadium; Attendance: 8,584; Referee: Samsudin Ibrahim

7 April 2017 9	Kuala Lumpur	2–0	Perlis	Selayang, Selangor
21:00 UTC+8	Guilherme 1', 61'	Report		Stadium: Selayang Stadium; Attendance: 242; Referee: Mohd Fairuzi Mat Desa

14 April 2017 10	ATM	1–2	Kuala Lumpur	Tanjung Malim, Perak
16:45 UTC+8	Smolyachenko 76'	Report	Babakhanov 4' (o.g.); Hafiz 90'	Stadium: Proton City Stadium; Attendance: 119; Referee: Ku Alauddin Ku Muhammad

25 April 2017 11	Kuala Lumpur	2–1	(Malaysia) MISC-MIFA	Selayang, Selangor
21:00 UTC+8	Konté 52'; Guilherme 84'	Report	Bodric Dimtri 13'	Stadium: Selayang Stadium; Attendance: 217; Referee: Mat Zan Abdul Wahad

5 May 2017 12	Perlis	0–5	Kuala Lumpur	Kangar, Perlis
16:45 UTC+8		Report	Hafiz 42'; Guilherme 79', 82', 90'; Ibrahim 90+3'	Stadium: Tuanku Syed Putra Stadium; Attendance: 454; Referee: Muhd Nazmi Nasaruddin

24 May 2017 13	Kuala Lumpur	6–0	ATM	Selayang, Selangor
21:00 UTC+8	Guilherme 19', 38', 42' (pen.), 44', 69', 90+5' (pen.)	Report		Stadium: Selayang Stadium; Attendance: 226; Referee: Ismail Asib Md Amin

30 June 2017 14	MISC-MIFA (Malaysia)	1–2	Kuala Lumpur	Shah Alam, Selangor
16:45 UTC+8	Dudu 60'	Report	Paulo 27'; Manaf 33'	Stadium: UiTM Stadium; Attendance: 280; Referee: Muhammad Almi Abdullah

10 July 2017 15	Kuala Lumpur	3–2	Negeri Sembilan	Selayang, Selangor
21:00 UTC+8	Guilherme 10'; Paulo 78', 80'	Report	Suzuki 83'; Farderin 90'	Stadium: Selayang Stadium; Attendance: 888; Referee: Wan Mohamad Tarmizi

14 July 2017 16	Kuantan (Pahang)	3–6	Kuala Lumpur	Kuantan, Pahang
21:00 UTC+8	Baranin 26', 86'; Malik 89'	Report	Hafiz 17'; Paulo 53', 80'; Guilherme 69', 78' (pen.), 84'	Stadium: Darul Makmur Stadium; Attendance: 125; Referee: Muhd Rahmat Jantan

21 July 2017 17	Kuala Lumpur	1–2	Terengganu	Selayang, Selangor
21:00 UTC+8	Guilherme 63'	Report	Kipré 19'; Gabriel Davis 83' (pen.)	Stadium: Selayang Stadium; Attendance: 1,399; Referee: Suresh Jayaraman

25 July 2017 18	PDRM	0–3	Kuala Lumpur	Krubong, Melaka
21:00 UTC+8		Report	Ashri 46'; Paulo 57'; Guilherme 89' (pen.)	Stadium: Hang Jebat Stadium; Attendance: 100; Referee: S. Logeswaran

4 August 2017 19	Kuala Lumpur	1–0	(Perak) PKNP	Selayang, Selangor
21:00 UTC+8	Zhafri 80'	Report		Stadium: Selayang Stadium; Attendance: 765; Referee: Zamzaidi Katimin

19 September 2017 20	UiTM (Selangor)	1–2	Kuala Lumpur	Shah Alam, Selangor
21:00 UTC+8	Akanni-Sunday 35'	Report	Guilherme 74', 90+2' (pen.)	Stadium: UiTM Stadium; Attendance: 195; Referee: Fitri Maskon

26 September 2017 21	Kuala Lumpur	2–0	Sabah	Selayang, Selangor
21:00 UTC+8	Guilherme 14', 55'	Report		Stadium: Selayang Stadium; Attendance: 1,347; Referee: Tiong Eng Tai

27 October 2017 22	Johor Darul Ta'zim II	3–1	Kuala Lumpur	Pasir Gudang, Johor
21:00 UTC+8	Barrales 3'; Saarvindran 20'; Fernández 61'	Report	Guilherme 63' (pen.)	Stadium: Pasir Gudang Corporation Stadium

=== Piala FA ===
Win Draw Loss

14 February 2017 Round of 32	Kedah	4–2	Kuala Lumpur	Alor Setar, Kedah
21:00 UTC+8	Liridon 33'; Zaiful 36' (o.g.); Farhan 42', 63'	Report	Zac 76' (o.g.); Zaiful 90+3'	Stadium: Darul Aman Stadium; Attendance: 12,000; Referee: Suresh Jayaraman

=== Piala Malaysia ===
==== Group stage ====
Pos	Team	Pld	W	D	L	GF	GA	GD	Pts	Qualification	PRK	FLDU	KUL	PKNS
1	Perak	6	5	1	0	13	3	+10	16	Advance to knockout phase	—	2–1	2–0	2–0
2	(Pahang) FELDA United	6	3	2	1	11	7	+4	11	Advance to knockout phase	1–1	—	0–0	3–2
3	Kuala Lumpur	6	1	2	3	3	9	−6	5		0–3	1–4	—	2–0
4	(Selangor) PKNS	6	0	1	5	4	12	−8	1		1–3	1–2	0–0	—

Updated to match(es) played on 9 September 2017. Source: FAM FMLLP

Win Draw Loss

4 July 2017	FELDA United (Kuala Lumpur)	0–0	Kuala Lumpur	Jengka, Pahang
21:00 UTC+8		Report		Stadium: Tun Abdul Razak Stadium; Attendance: 990; Referee: Mohd Nafeez Abdul Wahab

7 July 2017	Kuala Lumpur	0–3	Perak	Selayang Stadium, Selayang
16:45 UTC+8		Report	Gilmar 58', 82'; Dos Santos 72'	Attendance: 1,188; Referee: Suhaizi Shukri

18 July 2017	PKNS (Selangor)	0–0	Kuala Lumpur	Shah Alam Stadium, Shah Alam
21:00 UTC+8		Report		Attendance: 44; Referee: Fitri Maskon

29 July 2017	Kuala Lumpur	1–4	(Pahang) FELDA United	Selayang Stadium, Selayang
21:00 UTC+8	de Paula 90+2'	Report	Thiago Augusto 28', 49', 53'; Ifedayo 57'	Attendance: 459; Referee: Khairul Azuan Kidam

1 August 2017	Perak	2–0	Kuala Lumpur	Perak Stadium, Ipoh
21:00 UTC+8	Gilmar 22'; Pallraj 37'	Report		Attendance: 3,525; Referee: Ku Alauddin Ku Muhammad

9 September 2017	Kuala Lumpur	2−0	(Selangor) PKNS	Krubong, Melaka
21:00 UTC+8	Guilherme 47', 83'	Report		Stadium: Hang Jebat Stadium; Attendance: 115; Referee: Ku Alauddin Ku Muhammad

== Club officials ==
- Patron: Tengku Adnan Tengku Mansor
- President: Adnan Md Ikshan
- Deputy president: Astaman Abdul Aziz
- Vice-presidents: Mohamad Sidek Khalid, Johari Abdul Ghani, Theng Book, Nordin Abdul Ghani
- General secretary: Nokman Mustaffa

== Coaching staff ==
Position	Name
Manager	(Malaysia) Datuk Mohd Hishamudin Yahaya
Head coach	(Brazil) Fábio Magrão
Assistant coach	(Malaysia) Rusdi Suparman
Coach	(Malaysia) Hamizar Hamzah
Goalkeeping coach	(Malaysia) Mohd Hamsani Ahmad
Fitness coach	(Malaysia) Mohammad Fazrul Jafar
Physiotherapist	(Malaysia) Mohd Fadli Kamarulzaman
Physiotherapist	(Malaysia) Aimie Mohamed
Head Scout	(Malaysia) Abdul Ghani Malik
U21 Manager	(Malaysia) Kamaruddin Hassan
U21 Assistant Manager	(Malaysia) Muhammad Shahrir Mois
U21 Head coach	(Malaysia) Khalid Shahdan
U21 Assistant Coach 1	(Malaysia) Azlan Ahmad
U21 Goalkeeping coach	(Malaysia) Nor Harizan Abdullah
U21 Physiotherapist	(Malaysia) Muhammad Faiz Mokhtar
U19 Manager	(Malaysia) Muhamad Afeeq Adnan
U19 Assistant Manager	(Malaysia) Albert Chung
U19 Head coach	(Malaysia) Mohd Suhaimi Ismail
U19 Assistant coach	(Malaysia) Shariful Hisham Ibrahim
U19 coach	(Malaysia) Shahril Arsat
U19 Goalkeeping coach	(Malaysia) Mohd Zaki Tumpang@Ma'arof
U19 Fitness coach	(Malaysia) Mohd Hanafiah Abdul Rahman
U19 Physiotherapist	(Malaysia) Rusell Morris Banyang
U19 Masseur	(Malaysia) Hamzah Zakaria

== Transfers ==
First transfer window started in December 2017 to 22 January 2017 and second transfer window will started on 15 May 2017 to 11 June 2017.

=== In ===
==== First window ====
No.	Date	Pos	Player	Transferred From	Source
1	November 2016	GK	(Malaysia) Kamarul Effandi	(Malaysia) Sime Darby	
18	November 2016	GK	(Malaysia) Ahmad Solehin Mamat	(Malaysia) Melaka United	
25	November 2016	CB / LB	(Malaysia) Azmeer Yusof	(Malaysia) Kedah	
12	November 2016	CB	(Uzbekistan) Bobur Akbarov	(Uzbekistan) FC Andijon	
26	November 2016	RB	(Malaysia) Hazwan Abdul Rahman	(Malaysia) Petaling Jaya Rangers	
24	November 2016	CB / DMC	(Malaysia) Hisyamudin Sha'ari	(Malaysia) Perak TBG	
11	November 2016	LM / LW	(Malaysia) Ashri Chuchu	(Malaysia) Sarawak	
—	November 2016	DM	(Malaysia) Amirul Ikmal Hafiz	(Malaysia) Johor Darul Ta'zim II	
7	November 2016	CM / AM	(Argentina) Nicolás Dul	(Argentina) Chaco For Ever	
19	November 2016	CF	(Malaysia) Abdul Manaf Mamat	(Malaysia) Kelantan	
—	November 2016	CF	(Argentina) Carlos Chamorro	(Argentina) Colegiales	
10	18 January 2017	CF	(Brazil) Guilherme	(Malaysia) PDRM	

===== Second window =====
No.	Date	Pos	Player	Transferred From	Source
28	1 June 2017	LM	(Brazil) Paulo Josue	(Brazil) Votuporanguense	

=== Out ===
==== First window ====
No.	Date	Pos	Player	Transferred To	Source
—	November 2016	GK	(Malaysia) Mohd Soffuan Tawil	(Malaysia) UiTM	
—	November 2016	GK	(Malaysia) Badrulzaman Abdul Halim	(Malaysia) Melaka United	
—	November 2016	GK	(Malaysia) Norhadi Ubaidillah	(Malaysia) Melaka United	
—	November 2016	DF	(Malaysia) Nik Zul Aziz	Unattached	
—	November 2016	DF	(Malaysia) Fadhil Hashim	Unattached	
—	November 2016	DF	(Malaysia) Ahmad Azlan Zainal	(Malaysia) Sabah	
—	November 2016	RB	(Malaysia) Muhd Nazri Ahmad	(Malaysia) Melaka United	
—	1 December 2016	CB	(Brazil) Léo Carioca	(Brazil) Novo Hamburgo	
—	November 2016	LW	(Malaysia) Isma Alif Mohd Salim	(Malaysia) Melaka United	
—	November 2016	CM	(Malaysia) Rosdi Zakaria	(Malaysia) Penjara	
—	November 2016	CM	(Malaysia) Abdul Halim Zainal	(Malaysia) Selangor	
—	1 December 2016	LW / RW	(Malaysia) Fahrul Razi Kamaruddin	(Malaysia) Petaling Jaya Rangers	
—	1 December 2016	CM	(Palestine) Jonathan Cantillana	(Palestine) Ahli Al-Khaleel	
—	November 2016	CF	(Malaysia) Mohd Rasyid Aya	(Malaysia) Penang	
—	November 2016	CF	(Malaysia) A. Thamil Arasu	Unattached	
—	November 2016	CF	(Chile) Diego Inostroza	(Chile) Malleco Unido	
—	18 January 2017	CF	(Argentina) Carlos Chamorro	Unattached	

==== Second window ====
No.	Date	Pos	Player	Transferred To	Source
8	18 May 2017	MF	(Malaysia) Azidan Sarudin	(Malaysia) Penang	

=== Loan in ===
==== Second window ====
No.	Date	Pos	Player	Loaned From	Source
—	1 June 2017	LW / RM	(Malaysia) Tam Sheang Tsung	(Malaysia) Melaka United	
30	1 June 2017	LB	(Malaysia) Mohd Farid Ramli	(Malaysia) FELDA United	

=== Loan out ===
==== Second window ====
No.	Date	Pos	Player	Loaned To	Source
15	1 June 2017	DM / AM	(Mali) Modibo Konté	(Malaysia) Perlis	

== Statistics ==
=== Squad appearances ===
No.	Pos.	Name	Liga Premier	Piala FA	Piala Malaysia	Total
1	GK	(Malaysia) Kamarul Effandi	8	0	3	11
3	DF	(Malaysia) Naufal Naim	0	0	0	0
4	DF	(Malaysia) Zaiful Abdul Hakim	17	1	2	20
5	MF	(Malaysia) Hardee Shamsuri	8	0	3	11
6	FW	(Malaysia) Ibrahim Syaihul	10	1	4	15
7	MF	(Argentina) Nicolas Dul	19	1	4	24
9	FW	(Malaysia) Muhd Arif Anwar	4	1	0	5
10	FW	(Brazil) Guilherme	22	1	4	27
11	MF	(Malaysia) Ashri Chuchu	16	1	4	21
12	DF	(Uzbekistan) Boburjon Akbarov	21	1	6	28
13	MF	(Malaysia) Syazmin Firdaus	0	0	1	1
17	MF	(Malaysia) Irfan Zakaria	15	1	5	21
18	GK	(Malaysia) Ahmad Solehin Mamat	7	0	2	9
19	FW	(Malaysia) Manaf Mamat	16	0	5	21
20	MF	(Malaysia) Zhafri Yahya	22	1	6	29
21	DF	(Malaysia) Helmi Remeli	17	1	4	22
22	GK	(Malaysia) Mohd Remezey	7	1	1	9
23	MF	(Malaysia) Na'im Nazmi	19	0	5	24
24	DF	(Malaysia) Hisyamudin Sha'ari	12	0	5	17
25	DF	(Malaysia) Azmeer Yusof	16	1	2	19
26	DF	(Malaysia) Hazwan Abdul Rahman	4	0	3	7
27	DF	(Malaysia) Hafiz Johar	17	1	4	22
28	MF	(Brazil) Paulo Josue	9	0	6	15
30	DF	(Malaysia) Farid Ramli	2	0	4	6
31	GK	(Malaysia) Khatul Anuar	0	0	0	0
Left club during season
8	MF	(Malaysia) Azidan Sarudin	6	0	0	6
15	MF	(Mali) Modibo Konté	11	1	0	12

Last updated: 27 October 2017.
Source: SPMB

=== Top scorers ===
The list is sorted by shirt number when total goals are equal.

Rnk	Pos	No.	Player	Liga Premier	Piala FA	Piala Malaysia	Total
1	FW	10	(Brazil) Guilherme	27	0	3	30
2	MF	28	(Brazil) Paulo Josue	6	0	0	6
3	DF	27	(Malaysia) Hafiz Johar	3	0	0	3
4	FW	6	(Malaysia) Ibrahim Syaihul	2	0	0	2
5	DF	4	(Malaysia) Zaiful Abdul Hakim	0	1	0	1
5	MF	7	(Argentina) Nicolas Dul	1	0	0	1
5	MF	11	(Malaysia) Ashri Chuchu	1	0	0	1
5	DF	12	(Uzbekistan) Boburjon Akbarov	1	0	0	1
5	MF	15	(Mali) **Modibo Konté**	1	0	0	1
5	FW	19	(Malaysia) Manaf Mamat	1	0	0	1
5	MF	20	(Malaysia) Zhafri Yahya	1	0	0	1
5	DF	21	(Malaysia) Helmi Remeli	1	0	0	1
5	MF	23	(Malaysia) Na'im Nazmi	1	0	0	1
Own goals			none	1	1	0	0
**Total**				**47**	**2**	**3**	53

* Player names in bold denotes player that left mid-season

Last updated: 27 October 2017.
Source: Competitions

=== Clean sheets ===
The list is sorted by shirt number when total clean sheets are equal.

Rnk	No.	Player	Liga Premier	Piala FA	Piala Malaysia	Total
1	1	(Malaysia) Kamarul Effandi	3	0	2	**5**
2	18	(Malaysia) Ahmad Solehin Mamat	3	0	0	**3**
3	22	(Malaysia) Mohd Remezey	1	0	1	**2**
**Total**			**7**	**0**	**3**	**10**

Last updated: 27 October 2017.
Source: Competitions

=== Summary ===
Games played	**29** (22 Liga Premier) (1 Piala FA) (6 Piala Malaysia)
Games won	**16** (15 Liga Premier) (1 Piala Malaysia)
Games drawn	**4** (2 Liga Premier) (2 Piala Malaysia)
Games lost	**8** (4 Liga Premier) (1 Piala FA) (3 Piala Malaysia)
Goals scored	**52** (47 Liga Premier) (2 Piala FA) (3 Piala Malaysia)
Goals conceded	**34** (24 Liga Premier) (4 Piala FA) (9 Piala Malaysia)
Goal difference	**+15** (+23 Liga Premier) (–2 Piala FA) (−6 Piala Malaysia)
Clean sheets	**10** (7 Liga Premier) (3 Piala Malaysia)
Yellow cards	**40** (33 Liga Premier) (3 Piala FA) (7 Piala Malaysia)
Red cards	**2** (2 Liga Premier)
Most appearances	(Malaysia) **Zhafri Yahya** (29 Appearances)
Top scorer	(Brazil) **Guilherme** (30 goals)
Winning Percentage	Overall:16/29 (55.17%)
Total home attendance	**8,535** (**11** Liga Premier) (**3** Piala FA)

Last updated: 27 October 2017.
Source: Competitions
