= Hisyamudin Sha'ari =

Malaysian footballer

Personal information
- Full name: Mohamad Hisyamudin bin Mohamad Sha'ari
- Date of birth: 5 September 1987 (age 39)
- Place of birth: Kuala Lumpur, Malaysia
- Height: 1.77 m (5 ft 9 1/2 in)
- Position: Centre-back

Team information
- Current team: UiTM
- Number: 95

Youth career
- 2004: SSBJ
- 2005: Kuala Lumpur U-19

Senior career*
Years	Team	Apps	(Gls)
2006	Kuala Lumpur	19	(3)
2007–2010	UiTM	32	(2)
2011–2016	Perak	45	(0)
2017–2020	Kuala Lumpur	27	(0)
2021–	UiTM	0	(0)

International career^{‡}
2004–2006	Malaysia U-21	7	(0)
2011	Malaysia	1	(0)
- * Club domestic league appearances and goals as of 28 July 2018 ‡ National team caps and goals as of 10 April 2014

Mohamad Hisyamudin bin Mohamad Sha'ari (born 5 September 1987) is a Malaysian footballer who plays for Malaysia Super League club UiTM as a centre-back.

== Club career ==
=== UiTM ===
Hisyamudin was a product of Bukit Jalil Sports School, and later in the Kuala Lumpur youth team. He played a few times for the senior team of Kuala Lumpur, but later decided to quit professional football in 2007 to further his studies at Universiti Teknologi MARA, taking a Bachelor in Sports Science. While at UiTM, he does not abandon football completely as he represented UiTM Football Club, the university's football team, in a various amateur competition such as inter-varsity league and the Malaysia FAM Cup competition. He also represented for Malaysia University in 2010 ASEAN University Games at Chiang Mai, Thailand. In 2011, again he represented for Malaysia in World University that held in Shenzhen China.

=== Perak ===
Hisyamudin re-entry into professional football was unintentional. As he was searching for places to complete his industrial training for his studies, he attends the trial for Perak and was handed a senior contract for the 2011 season after completing the trial. This makes Perak as his first professional team, as he played before for Kuala Lumpur on a youth contract.

=== Kuala Lumpur FA ===
In November 2016, he returned to his former club, Kuala Lumpur.

=== UiTM FC ===
May 2021, he got call up for second window to his former club, UiTM FC.

== International career ==
=== Youth ===
Hisyamudin has played for Malaysia U21 between 2004 and 2006. He was on the team that won the 2005 4-Nations invitational tournament in Hong Kong.

=== Senior ===
Hisyamudin was called for the Malaysia national team and selected as one of the starting players for Malaysia for the friendly match against Hong Kong on 3 June 2011. He made his debut for the national team in this match.

== Career statistics ==
=== Club ===
As of 28 July 2018

Club	Season	League		Cup		League Cup		Continental		Total	
Club	Season	Apps	Goals	Apps	Goals	Apps	Goals	Apps	Goals	Apps	Goals
Kuala Lumpur	2017	12	0	0	0	5	0	–	–	17	0
Kuala Lumpur	2018	15	0	2	0	0	0	–	–	17	0
Kuala Lumpur	Total	27	0	2	0	5	0	0	0	34	0
Career total		0	0	0	0	0	0	0	0	0	0

=== International ===
As of 16 November 2011

Malaysia national team
Year	Apps	Goals
2011	1	0
Total	1	0
