= Chow Kwai Lam =

Malaysian footballer and coach (1942–2018)

Personal information
- Date of birth: 26 August 1942
- Place of birth: Negeri Sembilan, Federated Malay States
- Date of death: 16 July 2018 (aged 75)
- Place of death: Ampang, Selangor, Malaysia
- Position: Midfielder

Senior career*
Years	Team	Apps	(Gls)
- Negeri Sembilan
- Selangor

International career
1965–1971	Malaysia		

Managerial career
- 1978: Malaysia
- 1979–1983: Selangor
- 1984: Sarawak
- 1987–1989: Kuala Lumpur
- 1990–1991: Malaysia U-23
- 1992: Kuala Lumpur
- 1995–1998: Kuala Lumpur
- 1999: Perak
- 2002–2003: Tampines Rovers
- 2004–2005: Paya Lebar Punggol
Chinese name
Traditional Chinese	周貴林
Simplified Chinese	周贵林
Hanyu Pinyin	Zhōu Guìlín
Yale Romanization	Jāu Gwai-làhm
Jyutping	Zau1 Gwai3 Lam4
Hokkien POJ	Chiu Kùi-lîm
Tâi-lô	Tsiu Kuì-lîm
- * Club domestic league appearances and goals

Chow Kwai Lam (26 August 1942 – 16 July 2018) was a Malaysian football player and coach.

== Playing career ==
Chow played for Negeri Sembilan FA and Selangor FA in his playing career, winning 3 Malaysia Cups with Selangor, and runners-up in the inaugural 1967 Asian Club Championship also with Selangor, losing to Israel's Hapoel Tel Aviv in the final. He represented Malaysia from 1965 to 1971, being made captain of the 1965 Merdeka Tournament squad, before becoming the national team head coach in 1978.

== Coaching career ==
After the 1978 Malaysia coaching stint, Chow coached his former team Selangor FA from 1979 to 1983, before moving to coach Sarawak FA in 1984. He coached Kuala Lumpur FA in 1989, 1992, 1995, and 1996. In between his Kuala Lumpur stint, he also coached the Malaysia U-23 squad in their unsuccessful mission to qualify for the 1992 Olympic Games in Barcelona. He briefly coached Perak FA in 1999, before coaching in Singapore, first for Tampines Rovers in 2002 until 2003. He later coached Paya Lebar Punggol from December 2004 to June 2005, during which time he was accused of attempted bribery and fined RM114,000, at a court sentence in 2007. He maintains his innocence, as per reported in an interview with Malaysian newspaper Malay Mail in 2014. Until his death, this is the last known club Chow has coached in his career.

He won 6 more Malaysia Cups as coach (3 with Selangor and 3 in a row with Kuala Lumpur) in addition of 1 Charity Shield and 1 League championship, both also with Kuala Lumpur. He also won the 2002 Singapore Cup with Tampines Rovers in Singapore.

He was known in his coaching days as a 'firebrand' and 'fierce coach'.

== Match-fixing scandal ==
Chow was fined $50,000 and received a lifetime ban from football in Singapore and Malaysia for attempting to bribe his player, Zulkifli Zainolabidin who is a goalkeeper, to let the opposition score two or three goals in a 2005 S.League match. Zulkifli Zainolabidin is a former police officer and said that it had been a mistake to attempt to bribe him.

== Death and legacy ==
Chow died on 16 July 2018 in Ampang Hospital, Ampang, Selangor, at the age of 75.
