= Rozaimie Rohim =

Malaysian footballer

Personal information
- Full name: Rozaimie bin Rohim
- Date of birth: 6 November 1984 (age 41)
- Place of birth: Temerloh, Malaysia
- Height: 1.71 m (5 ft 7 in)
- Position: Goalkeeper

Team information
- Current team: Sabah
- Number: 30

Senior career*
Years	Team	Apps	(Gls)
2012	Kuala Lumpur	0	(0)
2016–	Sabah	7	(0)

Managerial career
- 2022-present: Sabah U19 (Goalkeeper Coach)
- * Club domestic league appearances and goals as of 5 May 2021

Rozaimie bin Rahim (born 6 November 1984) is a Malaysian professional footballer who plays as a goalkeeper for Malaysia Super League club Sabah.
