= 2001 Kuala Lumpur FA season =

Kuala Lumpur
2001 season
- Liga Perdana 1: 10th Place
- Malaysia FA Cup: Round 2
- Malaysia Cup: Group Stage
- Top goalscorer: League: Liew Kim Tu; All: Liew Kim Tu
- Biggest win: Kuala Lumpur 2—0 Johor (10 April 2001)
- Biggest defeat: Kuala Lumpur 0—5 Selangor (7 July 2001)

In the 2001 season, Kuala Lumpur competed in the Premier 1, Malaysia Cup and Malaysia FA Cup. They finished tenth in the league, but were eliminated in the FA Cup by a second division team and lost all their group matches in the Malaysia Cup. Foreign players were barred for this season. Kuala Lumpur FA is a Malaysian professional football club founded in 1974.

== Results and fixtures ==
All results (home and away) list Kuala Lumpur's goal tally first.

Date	Venue	Opponents	Score	Competition	KL scorers
March 13, 2001	KLFA Stadium, Cheras	JKR Kedah	1–0	FA Cup Rd 1	Zulkifli Afendi Zakri
March 18, 2001	Darulaman Stadium, Alor Star	JKR Kedah	1–2 (a.e.t., pen. 3–1)	FA Cup Rd 1	S Saravanan
March 24, 2001	KLFA Stadium, Cheras	JKR Kelantan	0–2	FA Cup Rd 2	
March 27, 2001	Sultan Muhd IV Stadium, Kota Baru	JKR Kelantan	1–0	FA Cup Rd 2	Rosle Derus
March 31, 2001	Utama Stadium, Kangar	Perlis	0–1	Premier 1	
April 3, 2001	KLFA Stadium, Cheras	Penang	0–1	Premier 1	
April 7, 2001	Darulmakmur Stadium, Kuantan	Pahang	0–1	Premier 1	
April 10, 2001	KLFA Stadium, Cheras	Johor	2–0	Premier 1	Liew Kim Tu, M Eswaran
April 14, 2001	Sultan Ismail Nasiruddin Shah Stadium, Kuala Terengganu	Terengganu	1–2	Premier 1	Liew Kim Tu
April 24, 2001	KLFA Stadium, Cheras	Perak	3–2	Premier 1	Liew Kim Tu (3)
April 28, 2001	Sultan Muhd IV Stadium, Kota Baru	Kelantan	0–4	Premier 1	
May 1, 2001	KLFA Stadium, Cheras	Negeri Sembilan	2–1	Premier 1	Farid Dewan, Shariful Hisham Ibrahim
May 8, 2001	Shah Alam Stadium	Selangor	0–5	Premier 1	
May 19, 2001	KLFA Stadium, Cheras	Sarawak	0–0	Premier 1	
May 26, 2001	KLFA Stadium, Cheras	Malacca	2–1	Premier 1	Farid Dewan, Zulkifli Afendi Zakri
July 3, 2001	KLFA Stadium, Cheras	Perlis	1–1	Premier 1	Rosle Derus
July 7, 2001	Batu Kawan Stadium	Penang	0–5	Premier 1	
July 10, 2001	KLFA Stadium, Cheras	Pahang	2–1	Premier 1	Liew Kim Tu, Rosle Derus
July 14, 2001	Larkin Stadium, Johor Baru	Johor	0–1	Premier 1	
July 28, 2001	KLFA Stadium, Cheras	Terengganu	0–2	Premier 1	
July 31, 2001	KLFA Stadium, Cheras	Kelantan	0–0	Premier 1	
August 7, 2001	KLFA Stadium, Cheras	Selangor	1–1	Premier 1	Liew Kim Tu
August 11, 2001	Kubu Stadium, Malacca	Malacca	1–1	Premier 1	Liew Kim Tu
August 14, 2001	Perak Stadium, Ipoh	Perak	1–1	Premier 1	Azralan Azmi
August 18, 2001	Sarawak Stadium, Kuching	Sarawak	0–0	Premier 1	
August 21, 2001	Tuanku Abdul Rahman Stadium, Paroi	Negeri Sembilan	3–3	Premier 1	Zulkifli Afendi Zakri, Liew Kim Tu
August 25, 2001	KLFA Stadium, Cheras	Telekom Malacca	1–1	Malaysia Cup/Promotion-Relegation Playoff	Liew Kim Tu
August 28, 2001	Kubu Stadium, Malacca	Telekom Malacca	1–0	Malaysia Cup/Promotion-Relegation Playoff	Liew Kim Tu
September 18, 2001	Tuanku Abdul Rahman Stadium, Paroi	Negeri Sembilan	0–3	Malaysia Cup Group A	
September 22, 2001	KLFA Stadium, Cheras	Selangor	0–2	Malaysia Cup Group A	
September 25, 2001	KLFA Stadium, Cheras	Johor FC	0–2	Malaysia Cup Group A	
October 2, 2001	JCorp Stadium, Pasir Gudang	Johor FC	1–4	Malaysia Cup Group A	Liew Kim Tu
October 6, 2001	KLFA Stadium, Cheras	Negeri Sembilan	0–6	Malaysia Cup Group A	
October 9, 2001	MPPJ Stadium, Petaling Jaya	Selangor	2–3	Malaysia Cup Group A	Liew Kim Tu, Shariful Hisham Ibrahim

== Tables ==
=== Malaysian Premier 1 ===
Pos	Team	Pld	W	D	L	GF	GA	GD	Pts	Qualification or relegation
8	Negeri Sembilan FA	22	7	6	9	32	39	−7	27	
9	Sarawak FA	22	5	9	8	19	26	−7	24	
10	Kuala Lumpur FA	22	5	8	9	19	34	−15	23	
11	Malacca FA	22	6	4	12	25	38	−13	22	
12	Johor FA	22	2	4	16	13	54	−41	10	Relegated to Liga Perdana 2

== Scorers ==
Player	League	Malaysia Cup	FA Cup	Total
(Malaysia) Liew Kim Tu	9	4	0	13
(Malaysia) Zulkifli Affendi Zakri	3	0	1	4
(Malaysia) Rosle Derus	2	0	1	3
(Malaysia) Farid Dewan	2	0	0	2
(Malaysia) Shariful Hisham Ibrahim	1	1	0	2
(Malaysia) Azralan Azmi	1	0	0	1
(Malaysia) M Eswaran	1	0	0	1
(Malaysia) S Saravanan	0	0	1	1
(Malaysia) Abdul Rahman Shariff	0	0	0	0
(Malaysia) Azali Mat Jusoh	0	0	0	0
(Malaysia) Azlan Hussain	0	0	0	0
(Malaysia) Azlan Meri	0	0	0	0
(Malaysia) Fairuz Salleh	0	0	0	0
(Malaysia) Imran Ahmad	0	0	0	0
(Malaysia) Kamarul Idham Amiruddin	0	0	0	0
(Malaysia) Khairi Zainudin	0	0	0	0
(Malaysia) K. Ramachandran	0	0	0	0
(Malaysia) Ridzuan Abu Shah	0	0	0	0
(Malaysia) Shahrudin Ahmad Mokshinon	0	0	0	0
(Malaysia) Yaakob Aris	0	0	0	0
(Malaysia) Yuzaiman Zahari	0	0	0	0
