= Mohd Khairul Anuar Jamil =

Malaysian footballer (born 1981)

Khairul Anuar
Personal information
- Full name: Mohd Khairul Anuar Jamil
- Date of birth: 7 January 1981 (age 45)
- Place of birth: Perak, Malaysia
- Height: 1.75 m (5 ft 9 in)
- Position: Central midfielder

Senior career*
Years	Team	Apps	(Gls)
2001	Melaka	21	(0)
2004–2006	Telekom Melaka	38	(1)
2007–2008	KL Plus	26	(0)
2009–2015	Felda United FC	62	(1)
2012	→Kuala Lumpur (loan)	6	(0)
2015	AirAsia F.C.		

International career
2004	Malaysia	1	(0)

Managerial career
- 2019: Petaling Jaya Rangers
- * Club domestic league appearances and goals

Mohd Khairul Anuar Jamil (born 7 January 1981) is a Malaysian former footballer who currently works as coach.

He had previously been playing for Telekom Melaka, and Plus, before signing with Felda United FC. In 2004, he was capped once with the national team.
