= Farid Ramli =

Malaysian footballer

Personal information
- Full name: Mohd Farid bin Ramli
- Date of birth: 28 April 1987 (age 39)
- Place of birth: Johor, Malaysia
- Height: 1.76 m (5 ft 9 1/2 in)
- Position: Left back

Youth career
- 2005: Johor FC President's Cup

Senior career*
Years	Team	Apps	(Gls)
2006–2009	Johor FC		
2010–2011	Kuala Lumpur	17	(0)
2012	Felda United		
2013	Johor FA		
2013–2014	Darul Ta'zim		
2014	Sime Darby	8	(1)
2015–2016	Penang	10	(0)
2016	PKNS	18	(0)
2017	Felda United	0	(0)
2017	→ Kuala Lumpur (loan)	2	(0)
2018	Kuala Lumpur	4	(0)
2020	Sarawak United	9	(0)

International career
2004–2006	Malaysia U21	5	(0)
- * Club domestic league appearances and goals as of 9 June 2018

Mohd Farid bin Ramli (born 28 April 1987 in Johor) is a Malaysian footballer who plays as a left-back.

Born in Johor, Farid started his football career with Johor youth team.

== Club career ==
=== Felda United ===
For 2017 season, Farid signed a one-year contract with Felda United. He spent most of his time at the bench during his time with the club.

=== Kuala Lumpur ===
On 1 June 2017, Farid agreed to join Kuala Lumpur for a loan deal. After his contract with Felda United expired he permanently signed a contract with the club.

== Career statistics ==
=== Club ===
As of 22 July 2018.

Appearances and goals by club, season and competition
Club	Season	League			Cup		League Cup		Continental		Total	
Club	Season	Division	Apps	Goals	Apps	Goals	Apps	Goals	Apps	Goals	Apps	Goals
Felda United	2017	Malaysia Super League	0	0	0	0	0	0	–		0	0
Felda United	Total		0	0	0	0	0	0	0	0	0	0
Kuala Lumpur	2017	Malaysia Super League	2	0	0	0	4	0	–		6	0
Kuala Lumpur	2018	Malaysia Super League	4	0	0	0	0	0	–		4	0
Kuala Lumpur	Total		6	0	0	0	4	0	0	0	10	0
Career total			0	0	0	0	0	0	0	0	0	0
