= Stanley Bernard =

Malaysian former footballer and football executive

Personal information
- Full name: Stanley Bernard Stephen Samuel
- Date of birth: 10 March 1986 (age 40)
- Place of birth: Petaling Jaya, Selangor, Malaysia
- Position: Forward

Team information
- Current team: Persib Bandung (sporting director/advisor)

Youth career
- 2001–2003: Bukit Jalil Sports School

Senior career*
Years	Team	Apps	(Gls)
2004–2008	Kuala Lumpur	6	(5)
2009	UPB-MyTeam	28	(12)
2010–2011	Sporting Clube de Goa	14	(5)
2011–2012	Sabah	17	(0)
2012	Kuala Lumpur	16	(1)
Total		81	(23)

International career
2009–2011	Malaysia	7	
- * Club domestic league appearances and goals

Stanley Bernard Stephen Samuel (born 10 March 1986) is a Malaysian former footballer and football executive. A former forward, he played for Kuala Lumpur, UPB-MyTeam, Sporting Clube de Goa and Sabah, and represented the Malaysia national football team. After retiring as a player, Bernard worked as a football pundit and match commentator for Malaysian broadcasters, including Astro SuperSport and Astro Arena. He later moved into football administration, as chief executive officer of Kuala Lumpur City, deputy chief executive officer of Harimau Malaya, and later becoming involved with Indonesian club Persib Bandung.

== Playing career ==
=== Kuala Lumpur ===
Bernard began his football development at Bukit Jalil Sports School before joining Kuala Lumpur. He represented the club from 2004 to 2008, playing as a forward during the early years of his professional career.

=== UPB-MyTeam ===
In 2009, Bernard joined UPB-MyTeam, where he continued his development in Malaysian domestic football and established himself as a senior professional player.

=== Sporting Clube de Goa ===
Bernard later moved abroad to India, joining Sporting Clube de Goa. His move made him one of the few Malaysian players of his generation to play professionally outside Malaysia. During his time with Sporting Clube de Goa, he was part of the squad that won the Indian Federation Cup in 2010.

=== Sabah ===
After returning to Southeast Asian football, Bernard joined Sabah, where he continued his professional career before later returning to Kuala Lumpur in 2012.

== International career ==
Bernard represented the Malaysia national football team between 2009 and 2011, earning seven senior international caps. He was part of the same generation of Malaysian players that emerged during the period in which Malaysia went on to win the AFF Suzuki Cup in 2010.

== Broadcasting career ==
Following his playing career, Bernard became a football pundit, match commentator and football analyst. He appeared on Malaysian and regional football programming, contributing to coverage across major international competitions, including the Premier League with Fox Sports Asia and Astro SuperSport, La Liga with Fox Sports Asia, and the UEFA Champions League with Astro SuperSport and Fox Sports Asia. He also appeared as a match analyst for broadcasters including Astro SuperSport and Astro Arena.

== Football executive career ==
=== Kuala Lumpur City ===
On 12 December 2020, Bernard was appointed chief executive officer of Kuala Lumpur United, later known as Kuala Lumpur City. His appointment marked a return to the club where he had previously played. During his tenure, Kuala Lumpur City won the Malaysia Cup in 2021, defeating Johor Darul Ta'zim 2–0 and ending the club’s 32-year wait for the trophy. The club also reached the AFC Cup final in 2022, where it finished as runner-up to Al-Seeb of Oman. In 2023, Kuala Lumpur City reached the Malaysia FA Cup final, its first appearance in the competition’s final since 1999.

=== Malaysia national team ===
In April 2025, Bernard was named deputy chief executive officer of Harimau Malaya by the Football Association of Malaysia. The appointment formed part of a restructuring of the national-team set-up, with Bernard working alongside chief executive officer Rob Friend on team operations, commercial development, sponsorship and fan engagement.

=== Persib Bandung ===
Bernard later became involved with Persib Bandung and PT Persib Bandung Bermartabat. Indonesian media reports in 2026 referred to him as an advisor to Persib and a figure involved with the club’s senior football structure. During the period of Bernard’s involvement, Persib won the Indonesian league title in three consecutive seasons, including the 2025–26 Indonesian Super League title.

== Honours ==
=== As executive ===
- Kuala Lumpur City
  - Malaysia Cup: 2021
  - AFC Cup runner-up: 2022
  - Malaysia FA Cup runner-up: 2023
- Persib Bandung
  - Super League: 2023–24, 2024–25, 2025–26

== Club career ==
=== Kuala Lumpur FA ===
Growing up in Kuala Lumpur, Stanley was a prodigy from the elite Bukit Jalil Sports School. At the age of 18 he made his debut with Kuala Lumpur FA in the second tier, Malaysia Premier League. He played for Kuala Lumpur FA for 5 seasons. In the 2008 Malaysia Cup group stage, Stanley was top scorer with 5 goals in 6 matches.

=== Perak UPB My/Team ===
Stanley moved to UPB-MyTeam in 2009, scoring 12 goals in 28 appearances in the Malaysia Super League, Malaysia FA Cup and Malaysia Cup. In the same year, Stanley made his debut for the Malaysia U23 team and also earned his 1st caps for the full national side.

=== Sporting Clube de Goa ===
Stanley was offered a trial at Indian League (I-League) team Goa in November 2009. His trial was successful and he signed for them mid-season as one of the two AFC import player quota. He became the first Malaysian to play his trade in the I-league. When Stanley signed, Sporting were facing relegation, sitting at the bottom of the 2009–10 I-League table with just one win from 13 matches. In the second half of the season Sporting managed 5 wins out of 13 matches and Stanley contributed 5 goals in 14 matches in all competitions including 2010 Indian Federation Cup Qualifying final play-offs. However, he was released at the end of the season due to new regulations that took away the quota for AFC foreign players at Indian clubs.

=== Sabah FA ===
After a successful trial in Indonesia, Stanley was offered a contract at Indonesian Super League (ISL) outfit Persibo Bojonegoro. He scored on his debut in the pre-season Java Cup but due to political tensions between Malaysia and Indonesia, Stanley’s deal fell through. Instead he joined East Malaysian club, Sabah FA, for the 2011 Malaysia Super League season under coach Gary Phillips.

=== Kuala Lumpur FA ===
In 2012, Stanley rejoined his first senior club, Kuala Lumpur FA. But towards the end of the season, he suffered a double fracture of the tibia, which put his professional career in doubt, eventually leading to his retirement at the early age of 26 after unsuccessful attempts at a comeback.

== International career ==
Stanley first represented his country as a 12-year-old in 1998. He would play numerous times for various age group sides, including the Malaysia U20 team in 2004-2005 under Jorvan Vieira and the Malaysia U23 in 2009. Later that year, he played for the senior national side for the first time. He earned his first full caps in two games against Zimbabwe and would also face regional rivals Indonesia. He was also in the 23-man squad for two friendlies against touring Manchester United in July 2009, coming off the bench in both games.

== Broadcasting career ==
In 2012, Stanley made increasingly regular guest appearances for Astro SuperSport on the popular Bola@Mamak programme, which was nominated for Best Talk Show in the Asian Television Awards. From August 2013, he contributed as a pundit on SuperSport’s English Premier League coverage and was a regular guest on the FourFourTwo Snapshot radio show on Lite FM in Malaysia. Stanley also works regularly as a co-commentator for the coverage on Astro Arena of the Malaysia Super League.

== Management career ==
=== Kuala Lumpur City ===
On 13 December 2020, Stanley was appointed by his former club as the CEO of Kuala Lumpur City. After one year Stanley joined KL City management, the club had won 2021 Malaysia Cup. Thus, winning the cup for the first time in 32 years.

=== Malaysia ===
In April 2025, Stanley was appointed Deputy CEO of Malaysia national football team.

=== Persib Bandung ===
Bernard later became involved with Persib Bandung and PT Persib Bandung Bermartabat.
