= Emmanuel Okine =

Ghanaian footballer (born 1991)

Personal information
- Full name: Emmanuel Ayaah Okine
- Date of birth: 17 December 1991 (age 34)
- Place of birth: Accra, Ghana
- Height: 1.92 m (6 ft 4 in)
- Position: Defender

Youth career
- 2007–2009: Great Olympics

Senior career*
Years	Team	Apps	(Gls)
2009–2011	Ajax Accra	0	(0)
2012	Kelantan FA	12	(0)
2012	→ Kuala Lumpur FA (loan)	20	(2)
2013	→ Perlis FA (loan)	15	(0)
2013–2016	Rosengård	67	(9)
2016	KSF Prespa Birlik	10	(0)
2017	Mjällby	16	(1)
2018	Kristianstad	16	(1)
2018	Landskrona BoIS	8	(0)
2019–2020	Mjølner	15	(0)
- * Club domestic league appearances and goals as of 00:27, 15 January 2022 (UTC)

Emmanuel Ayaah Okine (born 17 December 1991), simply known as Emmanuel Okine, is a Ghanaian footballer who plays as a centre defender. He is currently a free agent.

Emmanuel previously played for Great Olympics in the Ghana Premier League.

In November 2022, Okine got a 3.5 year prison sentence in Sweden due to financial fraud on a dating site. Okine received almost 3.5 million from a Swedish man who later on committed suicide.
