= Zakaria Charara =

Lebanese footballer

Personal information
- Full name: Zakaria Yehya Charara
- Date of birth: 1 January 1986 (age 40)
- Place of birth: Beirut, Lebanon
- Height: 1.75 m (5 ft 9 in)
- Position: Left midfielder

Youth career
- 1998–2005: Nejmeh

Senior career*
Years	Team	Apps	(Gls)
2005–2009	Nejmeh		(7)
2010	Al-Karmel		(1)
2010–2011	Al-Shabab		
2011–2012	Ermis Aradippou	5	(0)
2012	Kelantan FA	0	(0)
2012	→ Kuala Lumpur FA (loan)	19	(4)
2012–2014	Nejmeh	13	(2)
2013–2014	→ Akhaa Ahli Aley (loan)	11	(0)
2014	Masafi Al-Wasat		
2014–2015	Safa	12	(0)
2015–2019	Sagesse		

International career
2007	Lebanon U23		
2009–2012	Lebanon	10	(1)
- * Club domestic league appearances and goals

Zakaria Yehya Charara (Arabic: زكريا يحيى شرارة; born 1 January 1986) is a Lebanese former professional footballer who played as a left midfielder.

== Club career ==
Charara started his youth career with Nejmeh on 14 August 1999, before being promoted to the first team ahead of the 2005–06 season. In 2010, he moved to Jordan's Al-Karmel, where he played a couple of matches. The same year, Charara moved to Al-Shabab in Bahrain.

In August 2011, he signed with Cypriot First Division side Ermis Aradippou for the 2011–12 season. He debuted for Ermis in a 0–0 draw against Ethnikos Achna on 10 September.

Zakaria joined 2011 Malaysia Super League champions Kelantan FA on 6 December 2011, signing a two-year contract. However, due to a lack of playing time with Kelantan, Charara went on a loan until the rest of the season to fellow-Malaysian Super League side Kuala Lumpur FA. He scored his first league goal on 5 May 2012, converting a penalty in a 1–1 draw with Sarawak FA.

Following the 2012 Malaysia Super League, Zakaria re-joined Nejmeh. He made his debut on 29 September 2012 against Chabab Ghazieh.

== International career ==
Zakaria made his debut for the Lebanon national team in 2009. He scored once, in a friendly against Namibia. His last match was against South Korea in 2012.

== Career statistics ==
=== International ===
Scores and results list Lebanon's goal tally first.

#	Date	Venue	Opponent	Score	Result	Competition
1.	1 April 2009	Saida Municipal Stadium, Sidon	Namibia	1–1	1–1	Friendly

== Honours ==
Individual

- Lebanese Premier League Team of the Season: 2008–09
