= Muhd Zameer Zainun =

Malaysian footballer

Personal information
- Full name: Muhd Zameer bin Zainun
- Date of birth: 29 August 1990 (age 36)
- Place of birth: Kuala Langat, Selangor, Malaysia
- Height: 1.70 m (5 ft 7 in)
- Positions: Defender; midfielder; forward

Team information
- Current team: Johor Darul Takzim II
- Number: 3

Youth career
- 2008–2009: Selangor President's Cup Team

Senior career*
Years	Team	Apps	(Gls)
2009–2010	Selangor FA	8	(3)
2010–2011	PKNS FC	22	(8)
2011–2012	Kuala Lumpur FA	13	(5)
2012–2013	DRB-Hicom F.C.	19	(5)
2014–	Johor Darul Takzim II	14	(0)
2015–	Kuala Lumpur FA		
- * Club domestic league appearances and goals as of 7 August 2014 ‡ National team caps and goals as of 7 August 2014

Muhd Zameer bin Zainun (born 29 August 1990) is a Malaysian footballer who currently plays as a midfielder for Kuala Lumpur FA in the Malaysian Super League.

Previously, he played for PKNS FC. He was also the member of Selangor President Cup's team.

Zameer made his Malaysian League debut in 2009 Malaysian Charity Shield against Kedah FA. He also contribute one of Selangor goal in 4-1 trashing of the Malaysian champions.
