= Syafwan Syahlan =

Malaysian association football player

Personal information
- Full name: Muhammad Syafwan bin Syahlan
- Date of birth: 15 January 1993 (age 33)
- Place of birth: Kuala Lumpur, Malaysia
- Height: 1.77 m (5 ft 10 in)
- Position: Winger

Team information
- Current team: Kuala Lumpur
- Number: 14

Youth career
- Kuala Lumpur
- Harimau Muda B

Senior career*
Years	Team	Apps	(Gls)
2012	Kuala Lumpur	8	(0)
2013–2014	Harimau Muda B	23	(3)
2015	Harimau Muda	16	(5)
2016–	Kuala Lumpur	10	(2)

International career^{‡}
- Malaysia U22
- * Club domestic league appearances and goals as of 10 March 2019 ‡ National team caps and goals as of 1 February 2019

Muhammad Syafwan bin Syahlan (born 15 January 1993) is a Malaysian footballer who plays as a winger for Kuala Lumpur.
