= Kuala Lumpur City F.C. =

Association football club in Malaysia

Kuala Lumpur City
- Full name: Kuala Lumpur City Football Club
- Nickname: The City Boys
- Short name: KL City FC, KLCFC
- Founded: 1974; 52 years ago (as Federal Territory)
- Ground: Kuala Lumpur Stadium
- Capacity: 18,000
- Owner: Kuala Lumpur Football Association
- Head coach: Dollah Salleh
- League: Malaysia Super League
- 2025–26: Malaysia Super League, 4th of 13
- Website: kualalumpurfootball.com
Home colours	Away colours

Kuala Lumpur City Football Club, known simply as KL City FC, is a Malaysian professional football club based in Kuala Lumpur. The club competes in the Malaysia Super League, the top level of Malaysian football, and was founded in 1974 as Federal Territory by the Kuala Lumpur Football Association (KLFA). It was later renamed Kuala Lumpur FA and Kuala Lumpur United, before renaming to its current name in 2021.

Kuala Lumpur City have won two Malaysian league titles, four Malaysia Cups, three Malaysia FA Cups, and three Malaysian Charity Shields. It also played in the group stages of the Asian Club Championship on two occasions. In 1987, the club narrowly missed out on reaching the final due to goal difference in the semi-finals group stage.

Following its founding, a fierce rivalry developed between Kuala Lumpur and Selangor mainly due to their geographical location. The battle between these two teams is often referred to as the Klang Valley Derby, which was renewed in the 2010 season after Kuala Lumpur ended a seven-year spell in the second-tier with promotion to the Malaysia Super League. Kuala Lumpur were relegated to the second-tier Malaysia Premier League in 2012, and the following year, in 2013, they were relegated to the third-tier Malaysia FAM League for the first time.

== History ==
Kuala Lumpur had its most successful period in the late 1980s when they won the national league twice, in 1986 and 1988. They also won the Malaysia Cup for three consecutive years (1987, 1988 and 1989). The team enjoyed considerable success in cup competitions in the 1990s, winning the Malaysian FA Cup in 1993, 1994 and 1999. Kuala Lumpur won the Malaysian Charity Shield on three occasions, in 1988, 1995 and 2000.

The club endured a difficult campaign during the 2002 Liga Perdana 1 season, finishing 13th and suffering relegation for the first time in its history. Kuala Lumpur later ended a seven-year absence from the top flight when the club promoted to the 2010 Malaysia Super League to keep the team number balanced after Kuala Muda Naza and UPB-MyTeam withdrew. However, after two seasons, the club were relegated to the Malaysia Premier League in 2012 and the following year, in 2013, they were relegated once more to the Malaysia FAM League, marking their first appearance in the third tier. After spending three seasons in the lower division, Kuala Lumpur won the 2017 Malaysia Premier League title and earned promotion back to the top flight.

In the 2019 Malaysia Super League, Kuala Lumpur finished dead last and suffered relegation once again. However, the club bounced back in 2020, finishing third in the Malaysia Premier League and earning promotion back to the top flight, as Terengganu II, who finished second, were a reserve team and therefore ineligible for promotion, despite the season being shortened due to the COVID-19 pandemic.

In September 2020, the club was privatized in accordance to the privatization process by the Football Association of Malaysia and was renamed as Kuala Lumpur United. In December 2020, Stanley Bernard was named the new CEO of the club.

In March 2021, prior to the 2021 Malaysia Super League season, the team changed its name to Kuala Lumpur City. During the same season, Kuala Lumpur City defeated Johor Darul Ta'zim 2–0 in the final of the 2021 Malaysia Cup, winning the cup for the first time in 32 years.

As the reigning Malaysia Cup champions, Kuala Lumpur City participated in the AFC Cup for the first time in their history. The club enjoyed a historic run in the competition, winning the ASEAN Zone after defeating PSM Makassar 5–2 in the final. They subsequently advanced to the inter-zone knockout stage and reached the 2022 AFC Cup final, where they were defeated 3–0 by Al-Seeb of Oman at the Bukit Jalil National Stadium. It was the first time Kuala Lumpur City had reached a continental final, and they became only the second Malaysian club to do so.

In February 2023, Rinani Group Berhad acquired a majority stake in the club.

== Players ==
=== Current squad ===
As of 12 September 2026

Note: Flags indicate national team as defined under FIFA eligibility rules; some limited exceptions apply. Players may hold more than one non-FIFA nationality.

No.	Pos.	Nation	Player
1	GK	PHI	Quincy Kammeraad
3	DF	MAS	Adam Nor Azlin
4	DF	MAS	Kamal Azizi
5	DF	MAS	Raffi Nagoorgani
6	DF	MAS	Syazwan Andik
7	FW	MAS	Syafiq Ahmad
8	MF	MAS	Zhafri Yahya
9	DF	AUS	Giancarlo Gallifuoco
10	FW	GER	Reagy Ofosu
11	FW	MAS	Hazwan Bakri
12	MF	MAS	S. Kumaahran
13	GK	MAS	Ameerul Eqhwan
16	MF	MAS	J. Partiban
17	MF	MAS	Fazrul Amir
18	MF	MAS	Adam Mukriz
19	MF	MAS	Baqiuddin Shamsudin

No.	Pos.	Nation	Player
20	MF	MAS	Gary Steven Robbat
21	MF	MAS	Kenny Pallraj
22	DF	MAS	Firdaus Faudzi
23	DF	MAS	Azim Nadim Azmi
26	DF	MAS	Amer Saidin
27	FW	MAS	Amreel Iqbal Hafiz
28	FW	MAS	Paulo Josué (captain)
29	DF	MAS	Azrif Nasrulhaq
30	MF	MAS	Ibrahim Manusi (on loan from Johor Darul Ta'zim)
32	GK	MAS	Hafizy Nadzli
33	MF	MAS	Saiful Jamaluddin
35	GK	MAS	Haziq Fitri
37	FW	MAS	Rafie Yaacob
77	MF	MAS	Sharvin Selvakumaran
96	DF	UKR	Dmytro Lytvyn
—	FW	AFG	Fareed Sadat

== Management and coaching staff ==
Position	Staff
Head coach	(Malaysia) Dollah Salleh
Assistant head coach	(Malaysia) Ishak Kunju
Assistant coach	(Malaysia) Wan Mustaffa Wan Ismail
Goalkeeper coach	(Malaysia) Azmin Azram
Fitness coach	(Malaysia) Mashidee Sulaiman
Team admin	(Malaysia) Sheikh Muhammad Haris
Team security	(Malaysia) Zulkifli Abd Malek
Media officer	(Malaysia) Aris Danial
Team doctors	(Malaysia) Adzlan Amin
Team doctors	(Malaysia) Aizat Azam
Physiotherapists	(Malaysia) Cheryl Lynn Pereira
Physiotherapists	(Malaysia) Renesh Prabaharan
Masseurs	(Malaysia) Hamzah Zakaria
Masseurs	(Malaysia) Raja Adam Mikhail
Masseurs	(Malaysia) Faizwan Malek

=== List of head coaches ===
Years	Nat.	Name	Achievement
1979–1981	(Malaysia)	Yunus Tasman	
1982–1984	(Malaysia)	S. Subramaniam	
1985–1986	(Czech Republic)	Jozef Vengloš	1986 League Championship
1987–1989	(Malaysia)	Chow Kwai Lam	1987 Malaysia Cup; 1988 Malaysia Cup; 1989 Malaysia Cup; 1988 League Championship; 1988 Charity Shield Cup; 1989 ASEAN Club Championship
1990	(Czech Republic)	Jozef Jankech	
1991	(Czech Republic)	Milouš Kvaček	
1992	(Malaysia)	Chow Kwai Lam	
1993	(Malaysia)	S. Subramaniam	1993 Malaysia FA Cup
1994	(England)	Ken Shellito	1994 Malaysia FA Cup
1995 – May 1998	(Malaysia)	Chow Kwai Lam	1995 Charity Shield Cup
May 1998 – June 2000	(Malaysia)	Mat Zan Mat Aris	1999 Malaysia FA Cup; 2000 Charity Shield Cup
June 2000 – December 2000	(Malaysia)	Lim Kim Lian	
2001–2002	(Iraq)	Wathiq Naji	
2001–2002	(Malaysia)	Lim Kim Lian	
2003	(Slovakia)	Igor Novak	
2004–2007	(Malaysia)	Mat Zan Mat Aris	
January 2008	(Germany)	Hans Jurgen Gede	
April 2008 – 2012	(Malaysia)	Razip Ismail	
2013	(Slovakia)	Stanislav Leiskovsky	
2014	(Malaysia)	Tang Siew Seng	
January 2015	(Portugal)	Ricardo Formosinho	
April 2015	(Malaysia)	Tang Siew Seng	
December 2015 – November 2016	(Malaysia)	Ismail Zakaria	
December 2016 – March 2017	(Brazil)	Wanderley Junior	
March 2017 – September 2018	(Brazil)	Fábio Magrão	2017 Malaysia Premier League
December 2018 – March 2019	(Malaysia)	Yusri Che Lah	
March 2019 – June 2019	(Malaysia)	Chong Yee Fatt	
July 2019 – November 2019	(Malaysia)	Rosle Md Derus	
January 2020 – November 2020	(Malaysia)	Nidzam Adzha	
January 2021 – July 2023	(Croatia)	Bojan Hodak	2021 Malaysia Cup
July 2023 – March 2024	(Croatia)	Nenad Baćina	
March 2024 – 30 June 2025	(Croatia)	Miroslav Kuljanac	
1 July 2025 – 30 June 2026	(Serbia)	Risto Vidaković	
1 July 2026 – present	(Malaysia)	Dollah Salleh	

== Honours ==
=== Domestic ===
League

- Malaysian First Division
  - Winners (2): 1986, 1988
  - Runners-up (3): 1982, 1987, 1989
- Malaysian Second Division
  - Winners (1): 2017
- Malaysian Third Division
  - Runners-up (1): 2014

Cup

- Malaysia Cup
  - Winners (4): 1987, 1988, 1989, 2021
  - Runners-up (1): 1985
- Malaysia FA Cup
  - Winners (3): 1993, 1994, 1999
  - Runners-up (2): 1992, 2023
- Malaysia Charity Shield
  - Winners (3): 1988, 1995, 2000
  - Runners-up (5): 1987, 1989, 1990, 1994, 2022
- Federal Territory Minister Cup
  - Winners (2): 2021, 2023
  - Runners-up (1): 2022

=== Continental ===
- Asian Club Championship

1987: Group stage (2nd in Group B)
1989–90: Group stage (2nd in Group A)

- Asian Cup Winners' Cup

1994–95: Quarter-finals

- AFC Cup
  - Runners-up (1): 2022
- ASEAN Champions' Cup (Note: At the time, the tournament served to determine the teams qualifying for the final stage of the Asian Club Championship.)
  - Winners (2): 1987, 1989

=== U21 team ===
- Malaysian President's Cup
  - Winners (3): 1989, 1992, 1998
  - Runners-up (2): 1995, 2010

== Season-by-season record ==
Season	Division	Position	Malaysia Cup	Malaysian FA Cup	Malaysian Charity Shield	Continental
As Federal Territory
1979	Preliminary	16th of 17	Did not qualify	—	—	—
1980	Preliminary	17th of 17	Did not qualify	—	—	—
1981	Preliminary	14th of 17	Did not qualify	—	—	—
1982	League Cup	2nd of 16	Quarter-finals	—	—	—
1983	League Cup	8th of 16	Quarter-finals	—	—	—
1984	League Cup	4th of 16	Quarter-finals	—	—	—
1985	League Cup	5th of 16	Runners-up	—	—	—
1986	League Cup	1st of 16	Quarter-finals	—	—	—
As Kuala Lumpur
1987	League Cup	2nd of 17	Winners	—	Runners-up	ACC – Group stage (2nd)
1988	League Cup	1st of 17	Winners	—	Winners	—
1989	Division 1	2nd of 9	Winners	—	Runners-up	ACC – Group stage (2nd)
1990	Division 1	4th of 10	QF Group A (3rd of 4)	First round	Runners-up	—
1991	Division 1	4th of 10	Semi-finals	Semi-finals	—	—
1992	Division 1	5th of 10	Semi-finals	Runners-up	—	—
1993	Division 1	9th of 10	Did not qualify	Winners	—	—
1994	Liga Perdana	11th of 16	Did not qualify	Winners	Runners-up	ACWC – Quarter-finals
1995	Liga Perdana	11th of 15	Did not qualify	R1 Group E (3rd of 4)	Winners	—
1996	Liga Perdana	14th of 15	Did not qualify	First round	—	—
1997	Liga Perdana	9th of 15	QF Group A (4th of 5)	Quarter-finals	—	—
1998	Perdana 1	8th of 12	QF Group A (4th of 5)	Semi-finals	—	—
1999	Perdana 1	5th of 10	QF Group B (5th of 6)	Winners	—	—
2000	Perdana 1	8th of 12	QF Group B (3rd of 4)	Semi-finals	Winners	—
2001 Details	Perdana 1	10th of 12	QF Group A (4th of 4)	Second round	—	—
2002	Perdana 1	13th of 14	Did not qualify	Second round	—	—
2003	Perdana 2	5th of 12	Did not qualify	First round	—	—
2004	Liga Premier Group B	3rd of 13	R1 Group C (4th of 4)	Second round	—	—
2005	Liga Premier Group A	4th of 8	R1 Group C (4th of 4)	Semi-finals	—	—
2006	Liga Premier Group B	5th of 8	Did not qualify	First round	—	—
2007	Liga Premier	7th of 11	R1 Group A (3rd of 6)	First round	—	—
2008	Liga Premier	12th of 13	R1 Group B (4th of 6)	Second round	—	—
2009	Liga Premier	4th of 13	R1 Group C (3rd of 4)	Second round	—	—
2010 Details	Super League	9th of 14	R1 Group B (4th of 4)	Second round	—	—
2011 Details	Super League	12th of 14	R1 Group D (3rd of 4)	Quarter-finals	—	—
2012 Details	Super League	14th of 14	Did not qualify	Second round	—	—
2013	Premier League	11th of 12	Did not qualify	First round	—	—
2014	FAM League	2nd of 12	Did not qualify	First round	—	—
2015	Premier League	11th of 12	Did not qualify	Third round	—	—
2016	Premier League	5th of 12	R1 Group B (4th of 4)	Quarter-finals	—	—
2017 Details	Premier League	1st of 12	Group Stage	Second round	—	—
2018 Details	Super League	10th of 12	Group Stage	Quarter-finals	—	—
2019 Details	Super League	12th of 12	Did not qualify	Quarter-finals	—	—
2020 Details	Premier League	3rd of 12	Cancelled (Note: Cancelled due to the COVID-19 pandemic)		—	—
As Kuala Lumpur City
2021 Details	Super League	6th of 12	Winners	Not held	—	—
2022 Details	Super League	6th of 12	Quarter-finals	Second round	Runners-up	AFC – Runners-up
2023 Details	Super League	7th of 14	Semi-finals	Runners-up	—	—
2024–25 Details	Super League	6th of 13	Quarter-finals	Round of 16	—	ASEAN – Group stage
2025–26 Details	Super League	4th of 13	Semi-finals	Round of 16	—	—

Note: A single round-robin league system was instituted in 1979 following the entry of Brunei FA, Kuala Lumpur FA, Sabah FA and Sarawak FA into mainstream Malaysian football. For three years until 1981, the league remained no more than a preliminary round for the knock-out stages of the Malaysia Cup. In 1982, a League Cup was introduced to differentiate the league winners from the Malaysia Cup champions.

== Continental record ==
All results list Kuala Lumpur's goal tally first.

Season	Competition	Round	Club	Home	Away	Aggregate
1987	Asian Club Championship	Qualifying round (Group 6)	(Singapore) Tiong Bahru	0–0		1st out of 4
1987	Asian Club Championship	Qualifying round (Group 6)	(Brunei) Kota Ranger	8–1		1st out of 4
1987	Asian Club Championship	Qualifying round (Group 6)	(Indonesia) Krama Yudha Tiga Berlian	2–0		1st out of 4
1987	Asian Club Championship	Semi-finals (Group B)	(China) August 1	1–1		2nd out of 4
1987	Asian Club Championship	Semi-finals (Group B)	(Japan) Yomiuri FC	1–0		2nd out of 4
1987	Asian Club Championship	Semi-finals (Group B)	(Kuwait) Kazma SC	1–1		2nd out of 4
1989–90	Asian Club Championship	Qualifying round (Group 5)	(Philippines) Philippine Air Force	6–0		1st out of 5
1989–90	Asian Club Championship	Qualifying round (Group 5)	(Brunei) Muara Stars	7–1		1st out of 5
1989–90	Asian Club Championship	Qualifying round (Group 5)	(Indonesia) Pelita Jaya	2–1		1st out of 5
1989–90	Asian Club Championship	Qualifying round (Group 5)	(Singapore) Geylang International	4–2		1st out of 5
1989–90	Asian Club Championship	Semi-finals (Group A)	(Japan) Nissan Yokohama	1–2		2nd out of 3
1989–90	Asian Club Championship	Semi-finals (Group A)	(Oman) Fanja	2–0		2nd out of 3
1994–95	Asian Cup Winners' Cup	First round	(Brunei) ABDB	5–1	2–0	7–1
1994–95	Asian Cup Winners' Cup	Second round	(Indonesia) Gelora Dewata	2–1	0–2	w/o (Note: Gelora Dewata was disqualified due to fielding two ineligible players.)
1994–95	Asian Cup Winners' Cup	Quarter-finals	Telephone Org. Thailand	2–3 (a.e.t.)	1–2	3–5
2022	AFC Cup	Group H	(Indonesia) PSM Makassar	0–0		2nd out of 3
2022	AFC Cup	Group H	(Singapore) Tampines Rovers	2–1		2nd out of 3
2022	AFC Cup	ASEAN Zonal semi-finals	(Vietnam) Viettel	0–0 (a.e.t.) (6–5 p)		
2022	AFC Cup	ASEAN Zonal final	(Indonesia) PSM Makassar	5–2		
2022	AFC Cup	Inter-zone play-off semi-finals	(India) ATK Mohun Bagan	3–1		
2022	AFC Cup	Inter-zone play-off final	(Uzbekistan) Sogdiana Jizzakh	0–0 (a.e.t.) (5–3 p)		
2022	AFC Cup	Final	(Oman) Al-Seeb	0–3		
2024–25	ASEAN Club Championship	Group B	(Philippines) Kaya–Iloilo	1–0	—N/a	3rd out of 6
2024–25	ASEAN Club Championship	Group B	(Indonesia) Borneo Samarinda	1–0	—N/a	3rd out of 6
2024–25	ASEAN Club Championship	Group B	(Singapore) Lion City Sailors	—N/a	0–2	3rd out of 6
2024–25	ASEAN Club Championship	Group B	(Vietnam) Công An Hà Nội	2–3	—N/a	3rd out of 6
2024–25	ASEAN Club Championship	Group B	(Thailand) Buriram United	—N/a	0–1	3rd out of 6
