= 2015 Kedah FA season =

Kedah
2015 season
- President: Dato' Paduka Mukhriz Mahathir
- Manager: Dato' Jeffrey Low Han Chow
- Head Coach: Tan Cheng Hoe
- Stadium: Darul Aman Stadium; Alor Setar, Kedah, Malaysia
- Premier League: 1st
- FA Cup: Round 2
- Malaysia Cup: Runner-up
- Top goalscorer: League: Chidi Edeh (11); All: Chidi Edeh (18)
- Highest home attendance: 30,000 (vs Felda United F.C., 6 December 2015)
- Lowest home attendance: 3,000 (vs UiTM F.C., 22 June 2015)
- Average home league attendance: 13,799
- Biggest win: 5 - 0 vs Terengganu FA (H), 18 September 2015
- Biggest defeat: 2 - 0 vs Negeri Sembilan FA (A), 14 August 2015; 3 - 1 vs Terengganu FA (A), 17 October 2015; 2 - 0 vs Selangor FA (A), 12 December 2015
Home colours	Away colours	Third colours
- All statistics correct as of 10 May 2016.

The 2015 season was Kedah FA's 5th season in the Malaysia Premier League since its inception in 2004. They also participated in the Malaysia FA Cup and the Malaysia Cup.

== Players ==
=== Squad information ===
N	P	Nat.	POB	Name	Date of birth	Age	Since	Ends	Notes
1	GK	(Malaysia)	(Kedah)	Abdul Hadi Abdul Hamid	25 February 1987 (age 39)	28	2006		
2	DF	(Malaysia)	(Perak)	Mohamad Sabre Mat Abu	8 August 1987 (age 38)	28	2015	2016	
3	DF	(Malaysia)	(Kedah)	Lew Han Hung	9 February 1992 (age 34)	23	2015	2015	
4	DF	(South Korea)		Bang Seung-Hwan	25 February 1983 (age 43)	32	2015	2016	
5	DF	(Kenya)	(Nairobi City County)	Lawrence Omondi Olum	10 July 1984 (age 41)	31	2015	2015	
6	DF	(Malaysia)	(Kedah)	Shafizan Hashim	2 September 1982 (age 43)	33	2014	2016	
7	MF	(Malaysia)	(Kedah)	Baddrol Bakhtiar (VC)	1 February 1988 (age 38)	27	2006		
8	FW	(Malaysia)	(Kedah)	Ahmad Shakir Mohd Ali	5 March 1989 (age 37)	26	2015	2015	
9	FW	(Liberia)		Keith Murtu Nah	20 July 1995 (age 30)	20	2015	2015	
10	FW	(Nigeria)	(Lagos State)	Chidi Edeh	18 August 1987 (age 38)	28	2015	2015	
11	DF	(Malaysia)	(Kedah)	Mohamad Raphi Azizan Mariappen	28 January 1996 (age 30)	19	2015		
12	MF	(Malaysia)	(Selangor)	Mohamad Shazuan Ashraf Matthews	12 May 1992 (age 34)	23	2015		
13	DF	(Malaysia)	(Kedah)	Khairul Helmi Johari (C)	31 March 1988 (age 38)	27	2007		
15	DF	(Malaysia)	(Kedah)	Mohamad Rizal Ghazali	1 October 1992 (age 33)	23	2014		
16	DF	(Malaysia)	(Selangor)	P. Rajesh	21 June 1985 (age 40)	30	2015	2015	
17	MF	(Malaysia)	(Kedah)	Mohd Syazwan Tajuddin	7 January 1994 (age 32)	21	2014		
19	MF	(Malaysia)	(Kedah)	Muhammad Farhan Roslan	3 December 1996 (age 29)	19	2014	2017	
20	FW	(Malaysia)	(Kedah)	Muhammad Syafiq Ahmad	28 June 1995 (age 30)	20	2013		
21	GK	(Malaysia)	(Kedah)	Mohamad Syazwan Abdullah	2 April 1996 (age 30)	19		2016	
22	MF	(Malaysia)	(Perlis)	Mohamad Syazwan Zainon	13 November 1989 (age 36)	26	2014		
23	MF	(Malaysia)	(Kedah)	Mohamad Hanif Mat Dzahir	15 January 1994 (age 32)	21	2014		
24	DF	(Malaysia)		Muhd Fiqkry Mat Isa	2 May 1992 (age 34)	23	2012	2015	
25	GK	(Malaysia)	(Penang)	Mohd Firdaus Muhamad	13 January 1994 (age 32)	21	2015	2015	
31	MF	(Malaysia)	(Kedah)	Abdul Halim Saari	14 November 1994 (age 31)	21			
32	DF	(Malaysia)	(Kedah)	Osman Mohd Yusof	17 May 1994 (age 32)	21			
33	MF	(Malaysia)	(Kedah)	Syazuan Hazani	27 June 1994 (age 31)	21	2015		
48	DF	(Malaysia)	(Terengganu)	Mohamad Alif Fadhil Ismail	11 May 1992 (age 34)	23	2015	2016	
49	MF	(Kosovo)		Liridon Krasniqi	1 January 1992 (age 34)	23	2015	2018	
50	MF	(Brazil)	(Fortaleza)	Sandro da Silva Mendonça	1 October 1983 (age 42)	32	2015	2017	

Last update: 28 November 2016
Source: Facebook Kedah FA
Ordered by squad number.

=== In ===
N	P	Nat.	Name	Age	Moving from	Type	Ends	Transfer fee
5	GK	(Malaysia)	Mohd Firdaus Muhamad	20	Harimau Muda A	Transfer	2015	

=== Out ===
N	P	Nat.	Name	Age	Moving to	Type	Transfer fee

== Technical staff ==
Position	Staff
Head coach	(Malaysia) Tan Cheng Hoe
Assistant coach	(Scotland) Ian Andrew Gillan (Malaysia) Muhammad Nidzam Adzha
Goalkeeping coach	(Malaysia) Abdul Talib Saidi
Physiotherapist	(Malaysia) Muhammad Nur'illya Samsudin
Medical officer	(Malaysia) Mohd Syahrizal Nadzer
Kitman	(Malaysia) Abdul Razak Md Desa (Malaysia) Mohd Nasir Othman

Last updated: 10 May 2016
Source: Kedah FA Technical Staff

== Competitions ==
=== Overall ===
Competition	Started round	Final position / round	First match	Last match
Premier League	Matchday 1	Winners	6 February 2015	21 August 2015
FA Cup	Round of 32	Round of 16	27 February 2015	17 March 2015
Malaysia Cup	Group stage	Runners-up	12 September 2015	12 December 2015

Updated to match played 16 May 2016
Source: Competitions

=== Overview ===
Competition	Record							
Competition	Pld	W	D	L	GF	GA	GD	Win %
Super League	22	14	6	2	47	26	+21	63.64
FA Cup	2	1	0	1	1	1	+0	50.00
Malaysia Cup	11	5	3	3	23	16	+7	45.45
Total	35	20	9	6	71	43	+28	57.14

Last updated: 16 May 2016
Source: Competitions

=== Premier League ===
The league will kick-off on 6 February and ends on 21 August 2015.

==== League table ====
Pos	Team	Pld	W	D	L	GF	GA	GD	Pts	Promotion, qualification or relegation
1	Kedah (C, P)	22	14	6	2	47	26	+21	48	Promotion to Super League
2	Penang (P)	22	13	6	3	39	18	+21	45	Promotion to Super League
3	(Terengganu) T-Team (O, P)	22	12	6	4	50	27	+23	42	Qualification to Promotion play-off
4	(Selangor) PKNS	22	11	8	3	41	22	+19	41	
5	Johor Darul Ta'zim II	22	10	4	8	37	32	+5	34	

Source: FAM Official Site, Astro Arena
Rules for classification: 1) Points; 2) Goal difference; 3) Number of goals scored
(C) Champions; (O) Play-off winners; (P) Promoted

==== Results summary ====
Overall								Home						Away					
Pld	W	D	L	GF	GA	GD	Pts	W	D	L	GF	GA	GD	W	D	L	GF	GA	GD
22	14	6	2	47	26	+21	48	8	3	0	25	11	+14	6	3	2	22	15	+7

Last updated: 17 May 2016.
Source: Premier League fixtures and results

==== Results by round ====
Round	1	2	3	4	5	6	7	8	9	10	11	12	13	14	15	16	17	18	19	20	21	22
Ground	H	A	H	A	A	A	A	H	A	H	A	H	A	H	A	H	H	H	H	A	H	A
Result	W	D	D	L	D	W	W	W	W	W	D	W	W	W	W	D	D	W	W	L	W	W
Position	1	4	5	7	8	6	4	3	2	2	3	3	3	2	1	1	1	1	1	1	1	1

Source: Premier League fixtures and results
A = Away; H = Home; W = Win; D = Draw; L = Loss

==== Fixtures and results ====
Win Draw Loss Postponed

===== First leg =====
6 February 2015 1 (#3)	Kedah FA	5 - 1	Putrajaya SPA FC	Alor Setar, Kedah, Malaysia
20:45 UTC+08:00	Hanif Dzahir 24'; Bang Seung-hwan (substituted off) 31'; Syazwan Tajuddin (substituted on) 31' (yellow card) 80'; Keith Nah 48', 51'; Baddrol Bakhtiar 61'; Sabre Abu (substituted off) 66'; Shafizan Hashim (substituted on) 66'; Lawrence Olum (yellow card) 72'; Syazwan Zainon (substituted off) 75'; Syafiq Ahmad (substituted on) 75'; Chidi Edeh 90+2'	Report	Hishamuddin Othman (yellow card) 17'; Hafiz Hassan (substituted off) 38'; Norhafizzuan Jailani (substituted on) 38'; Kwon Jun (yellow card) 45+1'; Khairol Azry (substituted off) 62'; Khairul Izwan Khalid (substituted on) 62'; Chukwubunna 68'; Guy Bwele (substituted off) 85'; Rafiezan Razali (substituted on) 85'	Stadium: Darul Aman Stadium; Attendance: 9,318; Referee: Fairuzi Mat Desa

13 February 2015 2 (#11)	Kuantan FA (Pahang)	2 - 2	Kedah FA	Kuantan, Pahang, Malaysia
20:45 UTC+08:00	Malik Arrif 22'; Milan Purović 33' (pen.); Khairul Azman Awang (substituted off) 34'; Hanifuddin Rahman (substituted on) 34' (substituted off) 52'; Hazwan Fakrullah Zuridi (substituted on) 52'; Zamri Hassan (substituted off) 58'; Razren Jesni (substituted on) 58'; Muszaki Abu Bakar (yellow card) 85'	Report	Keith Nah 4' (yellow card) 69'; Baddrol Bakhtiar 9'; Khairul Helmi Johari (yellow card) 33'; Syafiq Ahmad (substituted off) 35'; Farhan Roslan (substituted on) 35'; Chidi Edeh (substituted off) 72'; Bang Seung-hwan (substituted on) 72'; Hanif Dzahir (substituted off) 86'; Shakir Ali (substituted on) 86'; Sabre Abu (yellow card) 89'	Stadium: Darul Makmur Stadium; Attendance: 1,600; Referee: Samsudin Ibrahim

20 February 2015 3 (#14)	Kedah FA	0 - 0	(Terengganu) T–Team F.C.	Alor Setar, Kedah, Malaysia
20:45 UTC+08:00	P. Rajesh (yellow card) 63'; Hanif Dzahir (substituted off) 67'; Syazwan Zainon (substituted on) 67'; Farhan Roslan (substituted off) 77'; Rizal Ghazali (substituted on) 77'	Report	Nor Hakim Hassan (substituted off) 67'; Safawi Rasid (substituted on) 67' (yellow card) 77'; Farhod Tadjiyev (yellow card) 71' (substituted off) 76'; Takhiyuddin Roslan (yellow card) 74' (substituted off) 82'; Akram Asidi (substituted on) 76'; Mohd Rosdi Zakaria (substituted on) 82'	Stadium: Darul Aman Stadium; Attendance: 21,900; Referee: Kamal Ahmad

6 March 2015 4 (#20)	PKNS F.C. (Selangor)	2 - 1	Kedah FA	Petaling Jaya, Selangor, Malaysia
16:45 UTC+08:00	Farderin Kadir 16' (substituted off) 79'; Gabriel Miguel Guerra (yellow card) 23' (goal) 87'; Aminuddin Noor (substituted off) 28'; Shahrul Azhar Ture (substituted on) 28'; Munir Amran (substituted off) 46'; Liew Kit Kong (substituted on) 46'; G. Jeevananthan (yellow card) 59'; Gonzalo Manuel Soto (yellow card) 77'; Yusri Abas (substituted on) 79'	Report	Chidi Edeh (substituted off) 46'; Shakir Ali (substituted on) 46'; Hanif Dzahir (substituted off) 69'; Syafiq Ahmad (substituted on) 69' (goal) 90'; Rizal Ghazali (substituted off) 74'; Sabre Abu (substituted on) 74'	Stadium: MBPJ Stadium; Attendance: 1,000; Referee: Suhaimi Mat Hassan

4 August 2015 5 (#25)	Kedah FA	0 - 0	Penang FA	Alor Setar, Kedah, Malaysia
20:45 UTC+08:00	P. Rajesh (yellow card) 20'; Syazwan Zainon (substituted off) 46'; Farhan Roslan (substituted on) 46' (yellow card) 48'; Syafiq Ahmad (substituted off) 64'; Shakir Ali (substituted on) 64'; Shafizan Hashim (yellow card) 89'	Report	Azinee Taib (yellow card) 15' (substituted off) 68'; Mat Saiful (yellow card) 24' (yellow-red card) 36'; Failee Ghazli (substituted on) 68' (yellow card) 89'; Azrul Ahmad (substituted off) 79'; Mazlizam Mohamad (substituted on) 79'; Alberto Gonçalves Da Costa (substituted off) 82'; See Kok Luen (substituted on) 82'; Sani Anuar (yellow card) 90+2'	Stadium: Darul Aman Stadium; Attendance: 18,878; Referee: Samsudin Ibrahim; Assistant referees: Maswari Mislam; Ahmad Azanor Huslan; Fourth official: Muhammad Khairulsyahmi

3 April 2015 6 (#36)	Kuala Lumpur FA	0 - 1	Kedah FA	Kuala Lumpur, Malaysia
16:45 UTC+08:00	Romdhizat Jamian (substituted off) 63'; Faizul Azizi (substituted on) 63'; Lukhman Noor Hakim (substituted off) 75'; Farouk Hashim (substituted on) 75' (yellow card) 87'; Syazwan Rani (substituted off) 81'; Fazilidin Khalid (substituted on) 81'	Report	Chidi Edeh 22' (substituted off) 77'; Syazwan Zainon (substituted off) 68'; Farhan Roslan (substituted on) 68'; Shazuan Ashraf Mathews (substituted on) 77'; Keith Nah (substituted off) 80'; Shakir Ali (substituted on) 80'; Hadi Hamid (yellow card) 90+1'	Stadium: Merdeka Stadium; Attendance: 800; Referee: Khairul Rizal Ismail; Assistant referees: Mohd Khalid Mohd Aris; Mohd Junaidy Abd Samad; Fourth official: Muhammad Firdaus Ibrahim

12 April 2015 7 (#37)	Johor Darul Ta'zim II F.C.	1 - 2	Kedah FA	Pasir Gudang, Johor, Malaysia
20:45 UTC+08:00	Zaquan Adha (yellow card) 52' (substituted off) 73'; Mohd Fazly (substituted off) 57'; Mohd Syafuan (substituted on) 57'; Faizol Hussien (substituted off) 59'; Shafiq Shaharudin (substituted on) 59' (yellow card) 60'; Ramzi Haziq (substituted on) 73'; Leandro Velázquez 87'	Report	Chidi Edeh 4' (substituted off) 90+4'; Bang Seung-hwan (yellow card) 26'; Sabre Abu (yellow card) 45+3'; Syazwan Zainon (substituted off) 70'; Farhan Roslan (substituted on) 70' (goal) 90'; P. Rajesh (substituted off) 88'; Rizal Ghazali (substituted on) 88'; Raphi Azizan Mariappen (substituted on) 90+4'	Stadium: Pasir Gudang Corporation Stadium; Attendance: 4,396; Referee: Lismotia Mohem Mohd Tisan; Assistant referees: Mohamad Hanif Abd Rahman; Mohd Saleh Yaacob; Fourth official: Marzuki Md Johari

17 April 2015 8 (#46)	Kedah FA	2 - 1	Negeri Sembilan FA	Alor Setar, Kedah, Malaysia
20:45 UTC+08:00	Sabre Abu (substituted off) 10'; Rizal Ghazali (substituted on) 10'; Chidi Edeh 12' (substituted off) 73'; Syazwan Zainon (substituted off) 68'; Farhan Roslan (substituted on) 68' (yellow card) 90+4'; Syafiq Ahmad (substituted on) 73'; Liridon Krasniqi 83' (yellow card) 84'	Report	Akmal Nor (yellow card) 47'; Fauzi Saari (substituted off) 72'; Hazeri Hamid (substituted on) 72'; Shahrizal Saad (substituted off) 72'; S. Sivanesan (substituted on) 72'; Jean Alexandre 76'	Stadium: Darul Aman Stadium; Attendance: 12,000; Referee: Nagor Amir Noor Mohamed; Assistant referees: M. Sivanesan; Suresh Basgaran; Fourth official: Muhammad Khairulsyahmi

24 April 2015 9 (#50)	Sabah FA	1 - 2	Kedah FA	Kota Kinabalu, Sabah, Malaysia
20:15 UTC+08:00	Joel Chianese 1' (substituted off) 87'; Hardy Charles Parsi (yellow card) 6'; Abdoulaye Faye (yellow card) 21'; Leopold Alphonso (substituted off) 72'; Ezaidy Khadar (substituted on) 72'; Azizan Nordin (substituted off) 72'; R. Surendran (substituted on) 72'; Rozaimi Rahman (substituted on) 87'	Report	Bang Seung-hwan (yellow card) 43'; Chidi Edeh 48'; P. Rajesh (yellow card) 71'; Farhan Roslan (substituted off) 72'; Syafiq Ahmad (substituted on) 72' (goal) 90+3'; Syazwan Zainon (substituted off) 87'; Shazuan Ashraf Mathews (substituted on) 87'	Stadium: Likas Stadium; Attendance: 19,000; Referee: Ahmad Zuhadi Dzulkifli; Assistant referees: Mohammad Juhairi Idris; Jais Bujang; Fourth official: Nazri Saptu

1 May 2015 10 (#58)	Kedah FA	2 - 1	(Perak) DRB-Hicom F.C.	Alor Setar, Kedah, Malaysia
20:45 UTC+08:00	Bang Seung-hwan (yellow card) 37'; Chidi Edeh (substituted off) 46'; Shakir Ali (substituted on) 46' (goal) 55'; Farhan Roslan (substituted off) 61'; Syafiq Ahmad (substituted on) 61'; Sandro 67'; Shafizan Hashim (substituted off) 89'; Shazuan Ashraf Mathews (substituted on) 89'	Report	Aizat Jaini (yellow card) 47'; Ashadi Yusoff (substituted off) 56'; Afiq Amsyar Salamat (substituted on) 56' (yellow card) 75'; Aris Zaidi (substituted off) 64'; Ahmad Aminuddin (substituted on) 64'; Fakhrullah Rosli 88'	Stadium: Darul Aman Stadium; Attendance: 18,400; Referee: Wan Zainuddin Harun; Assistant referees: Md Shahril Abu Seman; Abd Halim Md Ramlan; Fourth official: Shaharudin Man

19 June 2015 11 (#63)	UiTM F.C. (Selangor)	2 - 2	Kedah FA	Ipoh, Perak, Malaysia
22:00 UTC+08:00	Dao Bakary 14' (substituted off) 81'; Raslam Khan 21'; Shazlan Samah (substituted off) 66'; Zulkhairi Zulkeply (substituted on) 66'; Ibrahim Aziz (substituted off) 73'; Megat Ahmad Zakwan (substituted on) 73'; Nursalam Zainal Abidin (yellow card) 79'; Hasrul Nurkholis Hasim (substituted on) 81'	Report	Shakir Ali (substituted off) 45'; Syafiq Ahmad (substituted on) 45'; Baddrol Bakhtiar 53'; Syazwan Tajuddin (substituted off) 73'; Hanif Dzahir (substituted on) 73'; Sandro 75'; P. Rajesh (substituted off) 83'; Raphi Azizan Mariappen (substituted on) 83'	Stadium: Perak Stadium; Attendance: 200; Referee: Mohd Fairuzi Mat Desa

===== Second leg =====
22 June 2015 12 (#70)	Kedah FA	3 - 1	(Selangor) UiTM F.C.	Alor Setar, Kedah, Malaysia
22:00 UTC+08:00	P. Rajesh (substituted off) 46'; Syafiq Ahmad (substituted on) 46' (goal) 52', 55'; Syazwan Zainon (substituted off) 57'; Farhan Roslan (substituted on) 57'; Baddrol Bakhtiar 63'; Shafizan Hashim (yellow card) 67'; Sandro (substituted off) 81'; Syazwan Tajuddin (substituted on) 81'	Report	Mbom Julien (yellow card) 28'; Raslam Khan 36'; Dao Bakary (substituted off) 61'; Hasrul Nurkholis Hasim (substituted on) 61'; Ibrahim Aziz (yellow card) 74' (substituted off) 86'; Nursalam Zainal Abidin (substituted off) 82'; Syafiq Mokhtar (substituted on) 82'; Ibrahim Daniel (substituted on) 86'	Stadium: Darul Aman Stadium; Attendance: 3,000; Referee: Ramli Mat Dahan; Assistant referees: Naimuldin Haron; Abd Halim Mohd Ramlan; Fourth official: Muhammad Khairulsyahmi

26 June 2015 13 (#76)	Putrajaya SPA FC	1 - 2	Kedah FA	Alor Setar, Kedah, Malaysia
22:00 UTC+08:00	Khairol Azry 2' (substituted off) 80'; Muzammer Zaki (yellow card) 11' (substituted off) 66'; Azizi Azman (substituted on) 66'; Nik Azlam (substituted on) 80'	Report	Farhan Roslan (yellow card) 11' (substituted off) 65'; Liridon Krasniqi 16'; Hanif Dzahir (substituted off) 44'; Syazwan Tajuddin (substituted on) 44'; Syafiq Ahmad (yellow card) 55'; Chidi Edeh (substituted on) 65' (goal) 73'; Khairul Helmi Johari (yellow card) 81'; Baddrol Bakhtiar (substituted off) 90+2'; Shazuan Ashraf Mathews (substituted on) 90+2'	Stadium: Darul Aman Stadium; Attendance: 5,000; Referee: Mohd Jefri Zolkifli; Assistant referees: Mohd Faiz Che Mud; Abd Halim Md Ramlan; Fourth official: Muhammad Khairulsyahmi

3 July 2015 14 (#81)	Kedah FA	3 - 2	(Pahang) Kuantan FA	Alor Setar, Kedah, Malaysia
22:00 UTC+08:00	Syafiq Ahmad 13', 17'; Liridon Krasniqi 57'; Baddrol Bakhtiar (substituted off) 61'; Chidi Edeh (substituted on) 61' (yellow card) 90+1'; Bang Seung-hwan (substituted off) 71'; P. Rajesh (substituted on) 71' (yellow card) 72'	Report	Hazwan Fakhrullah (substituted off) 23'; Fiqri Abdullah (substituted on) 23'; Khairul Azman (substituted off) 42'; Fikri Elhan (substituted on) 42' (yellow card) 60'; Malik Arif (substituted off) 46'; Kamal Rodiarjat (substituted on) 46'; Zamri Hassan 73' (pen.); Muszaki Abu Bakar (yellow card) 78' (red card) 90+2'; Fabrice Noël 79'	Stadium: Darul Aman Stadium; Attendance: 4,232; Referee: Samsudin Ibrahim; Assistant referees: Masrawi Mislam; Ahmad Faizal Mamat; Fourth official: Muhammad Khairulsyahmi

7 July 2015 15 (#85)	T–Team F.C. (Terengganu)	0 - 2	Kedah FA	Kuala Terengganu, Terengganu, Malaysia
22:00 UTC+08:00	Rosdi Zakaria (substituted off) 51'; Zulhanizam Shafine (substituted on) 51'; Nor Hakim Hassan (yellow card) 54' (substituted off) 65'; Badrul Hisyam Morris (yellow card) 56' (substituted off) 77'; Safawi Rasid (substituted on) 65' (yellow card) 66'; Asrol Ibrahim (substituted on) 77'	Report	Sandro 47'; Syafiq Ahmad (substituted off) 60'; Chidi Edeh (substituted on) 60'; Farhan Roslan 61' (substituted off) 90+2'; Shafizan Hashim (substituted off) 83'; P. Rajesh (substituted on) 83'; Syazwan Tajuddin (yellow card) 90+1'; Shazuan Ashraf Mathews (substituted on) 90+2'	Stadium: Sultan Ismail Nasiruddin Shah Stadium; Attendance: 1,798; Referee: Wan Muhammad Tarmizi; Assistant referees: Mohairi Mohamed; Mat Zan Abd Wahab; Fourth official: Sukri Abd Rahman

31 July 2015 16 (#92)	Kedah FA	1 - 1	(Selangor) PKNS F.C.	Alor Setar, Kedah, Malaysia
20:45 UTC+08:00	Shafizan Hashim (yellow card) 26'; Liridon Krasniqi 45+1'; Syazwan Zainon (substituted off) 73'; Farhan Roslan (substituted on) 73'	Report	Pedro Henrique Oliveira 21'; Gabriel Guerra (substituted off) 25'; Khairu Azrin Khazali (substituted on) 25' (yellow card) 27'; Nazrin Syamsul Bahri (substituted off) 63'; Nor Ubaidullah (substituted on) 63'; Faiz Isa (yellow card) 70' (substituted off) 85'; Fazli Baharuddin (substituted on) 85'	Stadium: Darul Aman Stadium; Attendance: 14,750; Referee: Ku Alauddin Ku Muhammad; Assistant referees: Masrawi Mislam; Abd Halim Ramlan; Fourth official: Mohd Zaidi Zakariya

13 March 2015 17 (#99)	Penang FA	3 - 3	Kedah FA	George Town, Penang, Malaysia
20:45 UTC+08:00	Faiz Subri 38' (substituted off) 66'; Azinee Taib (substituted off) 46'; Hilton Moreira (substituted on) 46' (goal) 47', 90+1'; Elias Sulaiman (substituted on) 66'; Farid Ramli (yellow card) 66' (substituted off) 81'; Syukur Saidin (substituted on) 81'; Darwira Sazan (yellow card) 88'	Report	Bang Seung-hwan 5', 90'; Baddrol Bakhtiar 15' (yellow card) 41'; P. Rajesh (yellow card) 20'; Raphi Azizan Mariappen (substituted off) 60'; Rizal Ghazali (substituted on) 60' (yellow card) 72'; Syazwan Zainon (yellow card) 69' (substituted off) 72'; Syafiq Ahmad (substituted on) 72'; Keith Nah (substituted off) 83'; Shazuan Ashraf Mathews (substituted on) 83'	Stadium: City Stadium; Attendance: 1,798; Referee: Mohd Fairuzi Mat Desa; Assistant referees: Wan Salman Wan Yusof; Ahmad Faizal Mamat; Fourth official: Wan Zainuddin Harun

7 August 2015 18 (#103)	Kedah FA	3 - 0	Kuala Lumpur FA	Alor Setar, Kedah, Malaysia
20:45 UTC+08:00	Bang Seung-hwan 6' (yellow card) 65'; Sandro 20'; Raphi Azizan Mariappen (yellow card) 34'; Liridon Krasniqi 63' (substituted off) 71'; Hanif Mat Dzahir (substituted on) 71'; Syazwan Zainon (substituted off) 78'; Shakir Ali (substituted on) 78'; Syazwan Tajuddin (substituted off) 86'; Halim Shaari (substituted on) 86'	Report	Pritam Singh (yellow card) 23'; Fairuz Abdul Aziz (yellow card) 62' (substituted off) 78'; Syazwan Rani (substituted on) 78'; Romdhizat Jamian (substituted off) 86'; Afzal Akbar (substituted on) 86'	Stadium: Darul Aman Stadium; Attendance: 8,288; Referee: Mohd Fairuzi Mat Desa; Assistant referees: Abd Halim Mohd Ramlan; Mohd Ezanee Mohd Said; Fourth official: Shaharudin Man

11 August 2015 19 (#112)	Kedah FA	3 - 2	Johor Darul Ta'zim II F.C.	Alor Setar, Kedah, Malaysia
20:45 UTC+08:00	Chidi Edeh 2', 28', 59' (substituted off) 61'; Liridon Krasniqi (yellow card) 31' (substituted off) 81'; Khairul Helmi Johari (yellow card) 54'; Syafiq Ahmad (substituted on) 61'; Syazwan Zainon (substituted off) 73'; Farhan Roslan (substituted on) 73'; Hanif Mat Dzahir (substituted on) 81'; Syazwan Tajuddin (yellow card) 90'	Report	Alif Yusof (yellow card) 19'; Zaquan Adha 30', 66' (yellow card) 85'; Hazsyafiq Hamzah (yellow card) 39' (substituted off) 73'; Hasbullah Abu Bakar (substituted on) 73' (yellow card) 90+3'; Akmal Ishak (substituted off) 81'; Fandi Othman (substituted on) 81'; Irfan Fazail (substituted off) 86'; Na'im Nazmi (substituted on) 86'	Stadium: Darul Aman Stadium; Attendance: 18,815; Referee: Wan Zainuddin Wan Harun; Assistant referees: Azmi Khalid; Naimulddin Haron; Fourth official: Muhd Khairulsyami

14 August 2015 20 (#116)	Negeri Sembilan FA	2 - 0	Kedah FA	Paroi, Negeri Sembilan, Malaysia
20:45 UTC+08:00	Shahrizal Saad (substituted off) 60'; R. Aroon Kumar (substituted on) 60'; Khyril Muhymeen (substituted off) 65'; N. Thanabalan (substituted on) 65' (goal) 83'; Fazliata Taib (yellow card) 72'; Francis Forkey Doe 73'; S. Sivanesan (substituted off) 74'; Bruno Sebastian Martelotto (substituted on) 74'; G. Puaneswaran (yellow card) 88'	Report	Liridon Krasniqi (yellow card) 42'; Baddrol Bakhtiar (substituted off) 76'; Farhan Roslan (substituted on) 76'; Chidi Edeh (substituted off) 76'; Syafiq Ahmad (substituted on) 76'	Stadium: Tuanku Abdul Rahman Stadium; Attendance: 2,798; Referee: Ramli Mat Dahan; Assistant referees: Ahmad Mat Rashdi; Azizul Aziz; Fourth official: Khairul Rizal Ismail

18 August 2015 21 (#124)	Kedah FA	3 - 2	Sabah FA	Alor Setar, Kedah, Malaysia
20:45 UTC+08:00	Sandro 23' (pen.), 87' (yellow card) 88'; Halim Saari (substituted off) 44'; Shakir Ali (substituted on) 44' (yellow card) 90+3'; Bang Seung-hwan 60' (yellow card) 66'; Syazwan Zainon (substituted off) 73'; Farhan Roslan (substituted on) 73'; Chidi Edeh (substituted off) 90+2'; Hanif Mat Dzahir (substituted on) 90+2'	Report	Khairi Kiman (substituted off) 6'; Julamri Muhammad (substituted on) 6'; Joel Joseph Chianese 19', 30'; Rawilson Batuil (yellow card) 25'; Éamon Zayed (yellow card) 66'; Leopold Alphonso (substituted off) 68'; Zuraindey Jumai (substituted on) 68'; Hardy Charles Parsi (yellow card) 69'; Azizan Nordin (substituted off) 75'; R. Surendran (substituted on) 75'	Stadium: Darul Aman Stadium; Attendance: 22,213; Referee: Mohd Afzarizam Mamat; Assistant referees: Maswari Mislam; Shahimi Abdullah; Fourth official: Mohd Zaidi Zakariya

21 August 2015 22 (#129)	DRB-Hicom F.C. (Perak)	1 - 5	Kedah FA	Bukit Jalil, Kuala Lumpur, Malaysia
20:45 UTC+08:00	Ivan Babić 7'; Ally Imran Samarkhan Ismail (yellow card) 31'; Afiq Amsyar Salamat (substituted off) 46'; Syazmin Firdaus Aminuddin (substituted on) 46'; Hayato Hashimoto (substituted off) 74'; Aris Zaidi (substituted on) 74'	Report	Sandro 3', 32', 78'; Bang Seung-hwan (yellow card) 6'; Chidi Edeh 9', 49'; Syazwan Zainon (substituted off) 46'; Farhan Roslan (substituted on) 46'; Alif Fadzil Ismail (substituted off) 75'; P. Rajesh (substituted on) 75'	Stadium: Bukit Jalil National Stadium; Attendance: 12,000; Referee: Mohd Fairuzi Mat Desa; Assistant referees: Mohd Zairul Md Noor; Norzambri Ibrahim; Fourth official: Mohd Ridhwan Abd Rahman

==== Results overview ====
Win Draw Loss

Team	Home score	Away score
(Perak) DRB-Hicom F.C.	2 - 1	1 - 5
Johor Darul Ta'zim II F.C.	3 - 2	1 - 2
Kuala Lumpur FA	3 - 0	0 - 1
(Pahang) Kuantan FA	3 - 2	2 - 2
(Malaysia) Negeri Sembilan FA	2 - 1	2 - 0
Penang	0 - 0	3 - 3
(Selangor) PKNS F.C.	1 - 1	2 - 1
(Selangor) Putrajaya SPA FC	5 - 1	1 - 2
Sabah FA	3 - 2	1 - 2
(Terengganu) T–Team F.C.	0 - 0	0 - 2
(Selangor) UiTM F.C.	3 - 1	2 - 2

As of matches played on 21 August 2015.

=== FA Cup ===
The tournament will kick-off on 1 February 2015.

==== Knockout phase ====
27 February 2015 Round of 32 (#17)	Hanelang F.C. (Terengganu)	0 - 1	Kedah FA	Kuala Terengganu, Terengganu, Malaysia
16:15 UTC+08:00	Naim Asraff Nordin (yellow card) 48' (substituted off) 54'; Noor Fadlan (substituted on) 54'; Safix Ibrahim (yellow card) 64'; Md Abd Haqim (substituted off) 66'; Fazir Hikwan (substituted on) 66' (yellow card) 83'; Izuddin (substituted off) 76'; Zawawi Mat Arif (substituted on) 76'; Hazrul Nizam (yellow card) 79'	Report	Farhan Roslan 35' (substituted off) 90+2'; Chidi Edeh (yellow card) 56' (substituted off) 61'; Shakir Ali (substituted on) 61'; Hanif Mat Dzahir (substituted off) 69'; Shazuan Ashraf Mathews (substituted on) 69'; Shafiq Ahmad (substituted on) 90+2'	Stadium: Sultan Ismail Nasiruddin Shah Stadium; Attendance: 450; Referee: Saiful Mohd Rodzali; Assistant referees: Mohd Noor Abd Rahman; Mohd Ezanee Mohd Said; Fourth official: Samsudin Ibrahim

17 March 2015 Round of 16 (#26)	Kedah FA	0 - 1	Johor Darul Ta'zim II F.C.	Alor Setar, Kedah, Malaysia
20:45 UTC+08:00	Hanif Mat Dzahir (yellow card) 14' (substituted off) 79'; P. Rajesh (yellow card) 36'; Chidi Edeh (substituted on) 79'; Syafiq Ahmad (substituted off) 90'; Keith Nah (substituted on) 90'	Report	Kamarul Afiq Kamaruddin (yellow card) 16'; Mohd Syafuan (yellow card) 27' (substituted off) 68'; Leandro Velázquez (yellow card) 52'; Zaquan Adha (substituted off) 62'; Ramzi Haziq (substituted on) 62'; Alif Yusof (substituted on) 68' (yellow card) 77'; Akram Mahinan 88' (substituted off) 90+2'; Shahril Ishak (substituted on) 90+2'	Stadium: Darul Aman Stadium; Attendance: 9,448; Referee: Samsudin Ibrahim; Assistant referees: Muhamad Juhairi Idris; Wan Salman Wan Yusof; Fourth official: Abd Rahim Abdullah

=== Malaysia Cup ===
The tournament will kick-off on 25 August 2015.

==== Group stage ====
Pos	Team	Pld	W	D	L	GF	GA	GD	Pts	Qualification	LIO	KED	TER	JDT
1	(Singapore) LionsXII	6	4	1	1	9	7	+2	13	Advance to knockout phase	—	1–1	3–2	1–0
2	Kedah	6	3	1	2	15	9	+6	10	Advance to knockout phase	2–0	—	5–0	2–3
3	Terengganu	6	2	1	3	8	12	−4	7		1–2	3–1	—	0–0
4	Johor Darul Ta'zim II	6	1	1	4	7	11	−4	4		1–2	2–4	1–1	—

Source: FAM Astro Arena

Win Draw Loss Postponed

12 September 2015 1 (#3)	LionsXII (Singapore)	1 - 1	Kedah FA	Kallang, Singapore
19:45 UTC+08:00	Shahdan Sulaiman 17' (substituted off) 54'; Christopher van Huizen (yellow card) 35' (substituted off) 61'; Khairul Nizam (substituted on) 54' (yellow card) 60'; Faritz Hameed (substituted on) 61'; Faris Ramli (substituted off) 74'; Sahil Suhaimi (substituted on) 74'		Sandro 15'; Syazwan Zainon (substituted off) 71'; Rizal Ghazali (substituted on) 71' (yellow card) 85' (yellow-red card) 90+3'; P. Rajesh (substituted off) 79'; Alif Fadhil (substituted on) 79'; Chidi Edeh (substituted off) 82'; Shakir Ali (substituted on) 82'; Liridon Krasniqi (yellow card) 90+4'	Stadium: Jalan Besar Stadium; Attendance: 5,266; Referee: Mohd Zamzaidi Katimin; Assistant referees: Mohd Kamil Tumin; Ismail Samin; Fourth official: Fairuz Zulkiflee

18 September 2015 2 (#9)	Kedah FA	5 - 0	Terengganu FA	Alor Setar, Kedah, Malaysia
20:45 UTC+08:00	Baddrol Bakhtiar (yellow card) 30'; Sandro 52', 66' (pen.), 82'; Syazwan Zainon (substituted off) 71'; Shakir Ali (substituted on) 71'; Farhan Roslan 72'; Osman Yusof (substituted off) 78'; Alif Fadhil (substituted on) 78' (goal) 87'; Shafizan Hashim (substituted off) 85'; Shazuan Ashraf Mathews (substituted on) 85'	Report	Hafizal Mohamad (red card) 24'; Ashari Samsudin (substituted off) 53'; Azlan Zainal (substituted on) 53'; Norshahrul Idlan (red card) 75'; Zubir Azmi (substituted off) 78'; Fakhrurazi Musa (substituted on) 78'; Ismail Faruqi Asha'ri (substituted off) 85'; Sharin Sapien (substituted on) 85'	Stadium: Darul Aman Stadium; Attendance: 15,754; Referee: Muhd Nazmi Nasaruddin; Assistant referees: Hamzah Jaafar; Mohd Juhari Idris; Fourth official: Wan Zainuddin Harun

4 November 2015 3 (#17)	Johor Darul Ta'zim II F.C.	2 - 4	Kedah FA	Pasir Gudang, Johor, Malaysia
20:45 UTC+08:00	Nicolás Delmonte 25' (yellow card) 73'; Akhmal Ishak 27' (substituted off) 75'; Shahril Ishak (yellow card) 28'; Hasbullah Abu Bakar (yellow card) 40' (substituted off) 70'; Zaquan Adha (yellow card) 63'; Irfan Fazail (substituted off) 65'; Na'im Nazmi (substituted on) 65'; Kamarul Afiq Kamaruddin (substituted on) 70'; Shafiq Shaharudin (substituted on) 75'	Report	Chidi Edeh 17' (substituted off) 34'; Shafiq Ahmad (substituted on) 34' (goal) 69'; Bang Seung-hwan (yellow card) 39'; Shafizan Hashim (yellow card) 43' (substituted off) 79'; Syazwan Zainon 62' (substituted off) 83'; Liridon Krasniqi 76'; Rizal Ghazali (substituted on) 79'; Farhan Roslan (substituted on) 83'	Stadium: Pasir Gudang Corporation Stadium; Attendance: 2,900; Referee: Wan Muhammad Tarmizi Wan Ibrahim; Assistant referees: Mohd Shahreen Che Omar; Mohd Junaidy Abd Samad; Fourth official: Marzuki Md Johari

2 October 2015 4 (#24)	Kedah FA	2 - 0	(Singapore) LionsXII	Alor Setar, Kedah, Malaysia
20:45 UTC+08:00	Chidi Edeh 48', 78'; P. Rajesh (substituted off) 74'; Alif Fadhil (substituted on) 74'; Baddrol Bakhtiar (yellow card) 80'; Syazwan Zainon (substituted off) 81'; Syazwan Tajuddin (substituted on) 81' (yellow card) 90+1'; Shafizan Hashim (substituted off) 85'; Shazuan Ashraf Mathews (substituted on) 85'	Report	Faris Ramli (substituted off) 56'; Sahil Suhaimi (substituted on) 56'; Faritz Hameed (substituted off) 59'; Christopher van Huizen (substituted on) 59'; Nazrul Nazari (yellow card) 71'; Izzdin Shafiq (substituted off) 85'; Shahdan Sulaiman (substituted on) 85'	Stadium: Darul Aman Stadium; Attendance: 21,000; Referee: Mohd Amirul Izwan Yaacob; Assistant referees: M. Sivanesan; Asmadi Noor Hasni; Fourth official: Wan Zainudin Harun

17 October 2015 5 (#32)	Terengganu FA	3 - 1	Kedah FA	Kuala Terengganu, Terengganu, Malaysia
20:45 UTC+08:00	Vincent Bikana (yellow card) 10'; Ismail Faruqi Asha'ri (yellow card) 21'; Issey Nakajima-Farran 24', 73'; Sharin Sapien (yellow card) 53' (substituted off) 83'; Dhiyaulrahman Hasry (substituted off) 66'; Fakhrurazi Musa (substituted on) 66'; Hasmizan Kamarodin 76'; Nasril Izzat Jalil (substituted on) 83'; Gustavo Fabián López (substituted off) 85'; Zairo Anuar (substituted on) 85'	Report	Sandro (yellow card) 21'; Bang Seung-hwan (yellow card) 64' (goal) 68'; Syazwan Zainon (substituted off) 79'; Syafiq Ahmad (substituted on) 79'; Farhan Roslan (yellow card) 81'	Stadium: Sultan Mizan Zainal Abidin Stadium; Attendance: 8,600; Referee: Wan Mohd Tarmizi Wan Ibrahim; Assistant referees: Muhd Mu'azi Zainal Abidin; Mohd Zulkifli Jusoh; Fourth official: Ramli Mat Dahan

29 September 2015 6 (#41)	Kedah FA	2 - 3	Johor Darul Ta'zim II F.C.	Alor Setar, Kedah, Malaysia
20:45 UTC+08:00	Sandro 38' (substituted off) 83'; Hadi Hamid (substituted off) 44'; Syazwan Abdullah (substituted on) 44'; Syazwan Zainon (yellow card) 45+1' (substituted off) 46'; Shakir Ali (substituted on) 46'; Chidi Edeh 55'; Liridon Krasniqi (yellow card) 82'; Hanif Mat Dzahir (substituted on) 83'	Report	Fandi Othman (yellow card) 13' (substituted off) 56'; Shahril Ishak 15' (substituted off) 87'; Baihakki Khaizan 45+2'; Alif Yusof (substituted on) 56'; Hasbullah Abu Bakar (yellow card) 70'; Irfan Fazail (substituted off) 75'; Akmal Ishak (substituted on) 75'; Zaquan Adha 79'; Hazsyafiq Hamzah (substituted on) 87'	Stadium: Darul Aman Stadium; Attendance: 25,000; Referee: Muhd Nazmi Nasaruddin; Assistant referees: Hamzah Jaafar; Ahmad Azanor Huslan; Fourth official: Shaharudin Man

==== Knockout phase ====
===== Quarter-finals =====
24 November 2015 First leg (#52)	Kedah FA	1 - 1	(Selangor) PKNS F.C.	Alor Setar, Kedah, Malaysia
20:45 UTC+08:00	Baddrol Bakhtiar (yellow card) 13'; Syazwan Zainon (yellow card) 32' (goal) 75' (substituted off) 77'; Chidi Edeh (yellow card) 45'; Shafizan Hashim (substituted off) 69'; Rizal Ghazali (substituted on) 69'; Syafiq Ahmad (substituted on) 77'	Report	Khairu Azrin Khazali (yellow card) 15'; P. Gunalan (yellow card) 39'; M. Sivakumar (yellow card) 45'; Pedro Henrique Oliveira (yellow card) 64' (goal) 86'; Nazrin Syamsul Bahri (substituted off) 72'; Fazli Baharuddin (substituted on) 72'	Stadium: Darul Aman Stadium; Attendance: 25,000; Referee: S. Sittharajan; Assistant referees: M. Sivanesan; Hamzah Jaafar; Fourth official: Muhammad Nazmi Nasaruddin

28 November 2015 Second leg (#56)	PKNS F.C. (Selangor)	1 - 3 (2 - 4 agg.)	Kedah FA	Petaling Jaya, Selangor, Malaysia
20:45 UTC+08:00	Pedro Henrique Oliveira 58'; Nizam Abu Bakar (yellow card) 69'; P. Gunalan (red card) 75'; Faiz Isa (substituted off) 83'; Farderin Kadir (substituted on) 83'; Nazrin Syamsul Bahri (substituted off) 83'; Khuzaimi Piee (substituted on) 83'; Patrick Wleh (yellow card) 90+5'	Report	Chidi Edeh 29' (substituted off) 67'; Bang Seung-hwan (yellow card) 52'; Sandro 57'; Firdaus Muhammad (yellow card) 60' (substituted off) 90+5'; Syafiq Ahmad (substituted on) 67' (goal) 90+3'; Syazwan Tajuddin (yellow card) 72'; Syazwan Zainon (substituted off) 79'; Farhan Roslan (substituted on) 79'; Baddrol Bakhtiar (yellow card) 90+4'; Syazwan Abdullah (substituted on) 90+5'	Stadium: MBPJ Stadium; Attendance: 6,850; Referee: Samsudin Ibrahim; Assistant referees: Busrah Eri; Asmadi Noor Hasni; Fourth official: Khairul Rizal Ismail

===== Semi-finals =====
2 December 2015 First leg (#58)	Felda United F.C. (Kuala Lumpur)	2 - 2	Kedah FA	Petaling Jaya, Selangor, Malaysia
20:45 UTC+08:00	Thiago Augusto Fernandes 14', 55'; Khairul Ismail (substituted off) 27'; Fauzan Dzulkifli (substituted on) 27' (yellow card) 74'; Firdaus Fauzi (yellow card) 52'; Aizulridzwan Razali (yellow card) 67'; Syamim Yahya (substituted off) 69'; Ferris Danial (substituted on) 69'; Hadin Azman (substituted off) 86'; Hasni Zaidi Jamian (substituted on) 86'	Report	Sandro 37'; Chidi Edeh 63' (substituted off) 85'; Syazwan Zainon (substituted off) 77'; Syafiq Ahmad (substituted on) 77' (yellow card) 78'; Shafizan Hashim (substituted off) 80'; P. Rajesh (substituted on) 80'; Shakir Ali (substituted on) 85'	Stadium: MBPJ Stadium; Attendance: 8,800; Referee: Mohd Zohri Tajudin; Assistant referees: M. Sivanesan; Anuar Musa; Fourth official: Mohmmad Zamzaidi Katimin; Goal-line assistants: Wan Zainudin Harun; Ku Alaudin Ku Mohamad

6 December 2015 Second leg (#60)	Kedah FA	2 - 1 (4 - 3 agg.)	(Kuala Lumpur) Felda United F.C.	Alor Setar, Kedah, Malaysia
20:45 UTC+08:00	Chidi Edeh 44' (substituted off) 83'; Sandro 51'; Syazwan Zainon (substituted off) 72'; Shafiq Ahmad (substituted on) 72'; Shafizan Hashim (substituted off) 79'; P. Rajesh (substituted on) 79'; Farhan Roslan (substituted on) 83'	Report	Bojan Miladinovic (yellow card) 1'; Indra Putra Mahayuddin (yellow card) 22' (yellow-red card) 63'; Adib Aizuddin (yellow card) 30'; Syamim Yahya 39'; Hadin Azman (substituted off) 71'; Ferris Danial (substituted on) 71'	Stadium: Darul Aman Stadium; Attendance: 30,000; Referee: Muhammad Zamzaidi Katimin; Assistant referees: Hamzah Jaafar; Azmi Khalid; Fourth official: Tiong End Tai; Goal-line assistants: Mohd Faruzi Md Desa; Wan Zainuddin Harun

===== Final =====
12 December 2015 Final (#61)	Selangor FA	2 - 0	Kedah FA	Shah Alam, Selangor, Malaysia
20:45 UTC+08:00	Hazwan Bakri 3', 48' (yellow card) 22' (substituted off) 77'; Leandro Dos Santos (yellow card) 22'; Mohd Raimi Mohd Nor (yellow card) 29'; S. Veenod (substituted on) 77'; Andik Vermansyah (substituted off) 82'; Fitri Shazwan Raduwan (substituted on) 82'; Abdul Hadi Yahya (substituted off) 88'; K. Gurusamy (substituted on) 88'	Report	Shafizan Hashim (yellow card) 22' (substituted off) 74'; Chidi Edeh (yellow card) 42'; Syazwan Tajuddin (substituted off) 57'; Farhan Roslan (substituted on) 57'; Syafiq Ahmad (substituted on) 74'; Firdaus Muhammad (red card) 84'; Syazwan Zainon (substituted off) 84'; Syazwan Abdullah (substituted on) 84'	Stadium: Shah Alam Stadium; Attendance: 80,000; Referee: Muhammad Nazmi Nasaruddin; Assistant referees: Ismadi Ibrahim; Abdul Haron Osman; Fourth official: Ahmad Zuhaidi Dzulkifli
