= Abdul Hadi Abdul Hamid =

Malaysian footballer

Abdul Hadi Hamid
Personal information
- Full name: Abdul Hadi bin Abdul Hamid
- Date of birth: 25 February 1987 (age 39)
- Place of birth: Kuala Kedah, Malaysia
- Height: 1.75 m (5 ft 9 in)
- Position: Goalkeeper

Team information
- Current team: Immigration (goalkeeping coach)

Youth career
- 2005–2006: Kedah

Senior career*
Years	Team	Apps	(Gls)
2006–2019	Kedah	65	(0)

International career
2005–2006	Malaysia U20	10	(0)

Managerial career
- 2020–2021: Kedah (assistant goalkeeping coach)
- 2021–2025: Kedah Darul Aman (assistant goalkeeping coach)
- 2025–: Immgiration (goalkeeping coach)
- * Club domestic league appearances and goals

Abdul Hadi bin Abdul Hamid (born 25 February 1987 in Kuala Kedah) is a Malaysian former professional footballer.

== Club career ==
Hadi, who is a football silver medalist of SUKMA 2006 has been promoted to the senior squad after Kedah coach Azraai Khor brought him in as backup for current number one goalkeeper Helmi Eliza. Azraai was forced to bring another goalkeeper after Megat Amir Faisal Al Khalidi Ibrahim left the club to join Selangor. He also a former member of Malaysia U-20 squad in 2005 until 2006.

An admirer of Superman, he made his first team debut for Kedah in a Malaysia Super League match against Perak on 3 January 2007 after Helmi Eliza has been sent off. Kedah won the match with 4–3 result at their own ground, Darulaman Stadium.

== Kedah FA Coaching Career ==
On 28 November 2019, following his retirement on football career, Hadi due to joining Kedah FA coaching team management and he was appointed as assistant goalkeeping coach for 2020 Malaysia Super League seasons.

== International career ==
For international appearance, Hadi earned his first call-up in 2005 to the Malaysia U-20 squad alongside Baddrol Bakhtiar, Mohd Khyril Muhymeen Zambri, Muhammad Shafiq Jamal, Mohd Bunyamin Umar, Mohd Sabre Mat Abu and became a first choice goalkeeper of K. Rajagopal's side. He made his full major international debut in AFC Youth Championship 2006 qualifying round on 12 December 2005 against Myanmar at Kuala Lumpur as Malaysia beat Myanmar 4–2.

== Career statistics ==
=== Club ===
As of 27 June 2018

Club	Season	League		Cup		League Cup		Continental		Total	
Club	Season	Apps	Goals	Apps	Goals	Apps	Goals	Apps	Goals	Apps	Goals
Kedah	2007	0	0	0	0	0	0	–	–	0	0
Kedah	2008	0	0	0	0	0	0	–	–	0	0
Kedah	2009	0	0	0	0	0	0	–	–	0	0
Kedah	2010	0	0	0	0	0	0	–	–	0	0
Kedah	2011	0	0	0	0	0	0	–	–	0	0
Kedah	2012	0	0	0	0	0	0	–	–	0	0
Kedah	2013	0	0	0	0	0	0	–	–	0	0
Kedah	2014	0	0	0	0	0	0	–	–	0	0
Kedah	2015	0	0	0	0	0	0	–	–	0	0
Kedah	2016	0	0	0	0	0	0	–	–	0	0
Kedah	2017	0	0	0	0	0	0	–	–	0	0
Kedah	2018	0	0	0	0	0	0	–	–	0	0
Kedah	Total	0	0	0	0	0	0	0	0	0	0
Career total		0	0	0	0	0	0	0	0	0	0

== Honours ==
=== Club ===
Kedah

- Malaysia Super League (2): 2006–2007, 2007–2008
- FA Cup Malaysia (4): 2007, 2008, 2017, 2019
- Malaysia Cup (3): 2007, 2008, 2016
- Malaysia Premier League (2): 2005–06, 2015
- Malaysia Charity Shield : 2017
