= Baddrol Bakhtiar =

Malaysian politician and former professional footballer

Yang Berhormat Tuan Baddrol Bakhtiar ASK BSJ MLA
- بدرول بن بختيار
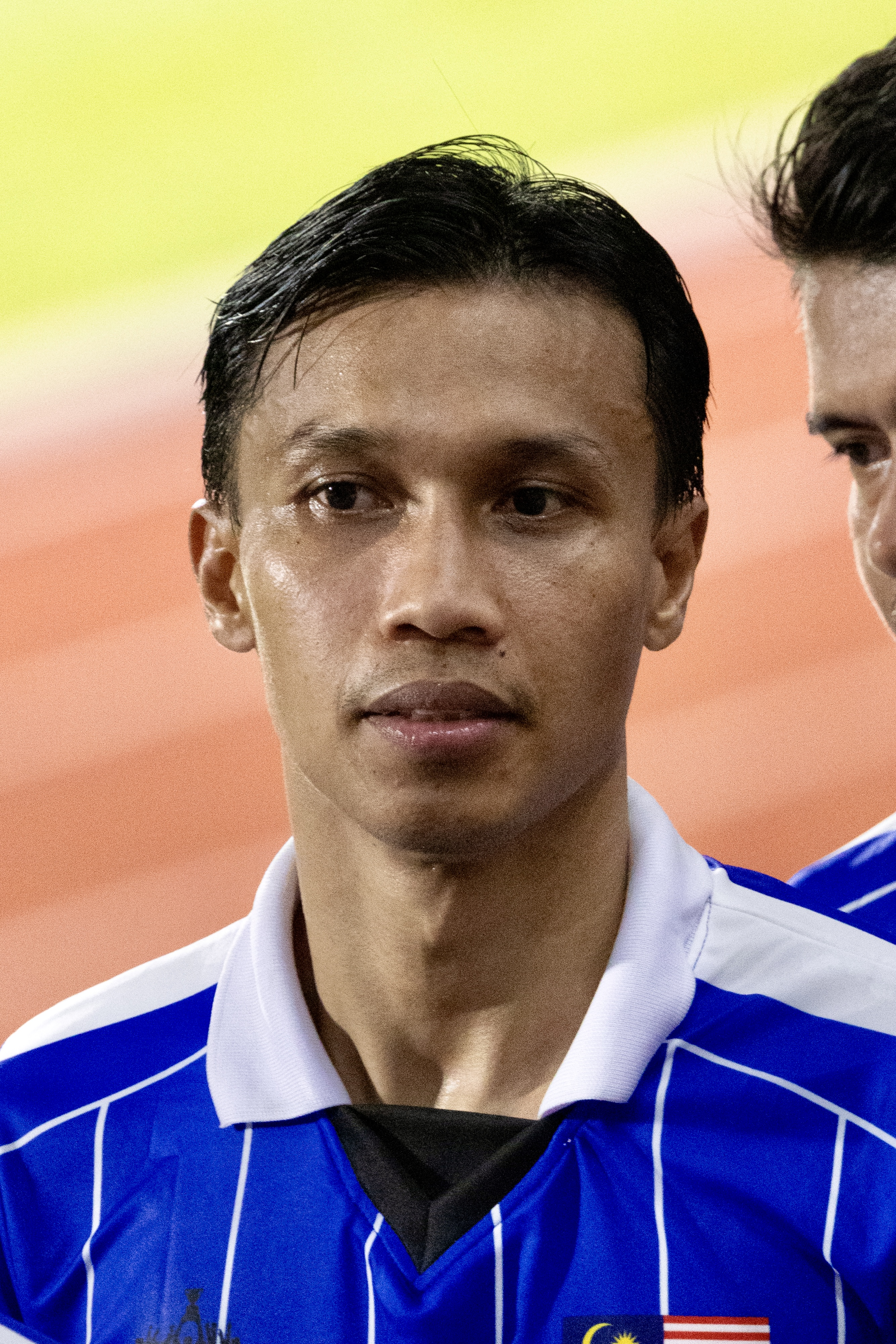
- Baddrol in 2024

Member of the Kedah State Legislative Assembly for Gurun
- Incumbent
- Assumed office 12 August 2023
- Preceded by: Johari Abdul (PH–PKR)
- Majority: 6,584 (2023)

Personal details
- Born: Baddrol bin Bakhtiar; 1 February 1988 (age 38) Sarawak, Malaysia
- Party: Malaysian Islamic Party (PAS)
- Other political affiliations: Perikatan Nasional (PN)
Association football career
- Height: 1.78 m (5 ft 10 in)
- Position: Midfielder
Team information
- Current team: Kedah FA (technical director)
Youth career
- 2005–2006: Kedah U-19
Senior career*
Years	Team	Apps	(Gls)
2006–2021	Kedah Darul Aman	235	(80)
2022–2023	Sabah	42	(15)
Total		277	(95)
International career^{‡}
2005–2006	Malaysia U-20		
2009–2018	Malaysia U-23	31	(8)
2009–2021	Malaysia	64	(6)
Medal record
Men's football
Representing Malaysia
ASEAN Championship
Runner-up	2014 AFF Championship
Malaysia U23
SEA Games
Gold medal – first place	2011 Jakarta-Palembang	Team
Gold medal – first place	2009 Vientiane	Team
Malaysia U20
Runner-up	AFF U20	2007
- * Club domestic league appearances and goals ‡ National team caps and goals as of 19 December 2021

Baddrol bin Bakhtiar (born 1 February 1988) is a Malaysian politician and former professional footballer who has served as Member of the Kedah State Legislative Assembly (MLA) for Gurun since August 2023. He is a member of the Malaysian Islamic Party (PAS), a component party of the Perikatan Nasional (PN) coalition. He is also a former member of the Malaysia U-20, Malaysia U-23 and Malaysia national team squads as well as a former player of Kedah Darul Aman FC. He ended his football career as the captain of the Sabah FC team. He retired from football in 2023, before venturing into politics. During the 2023 Kedah state election, he was announced as the Perikatan Nasional candidate for the Gurun constituency.

== Club career ==
=== Kedah ===
Baddrol began his football career with the Kedah youth team. He also was part of the Kedah's 2006 Sukma Games team that won the silver medal. He was a regular throughout the tournament. His performance during theSukma Games attracted the interest of the Kedah Football Association management. Baddrol signed his first professional contract with Kedah in the 2005-06 season and made his debut in the 2006 Malaysia Cup away match against Penang. Baddrol established himself in Kedah's first team, competing for his spot alongside K. Soley as a right winger and Khyril Muhymeen on the left

Nevertheless, after K. Soley left Kedah to join their local rivals, Perlis, Baddrol proved himself as one of the best young talents of the Kedah's youth team system. Starting from the 2007-08 season, Baddrol became a first-team regular for Azraai Khor's squad and performed well in each match with his ability to terrorise defenders, and his pace and trickery with the ball.

Baddrol played more than 400 matches and scored 123 goals in all competitions for Kedah, making him recognised as the club's all-time top scorer.

==== Training stints and trials ====
On 6 April 2008, Gifted Group and Football Association of Malaysia selected Baddrol and his former Kedah teammate Mohd Bunyamin Umar for a two weeks' training stint with Chelsea FC at Stamford Bridge alongside their youngsters and more senior players such as Shaun Wright-Phillips, Tal Ben Haim, Steve Sidwell and Nicolas Anelka.

In August 2011, rumours circulated that English Premier League club Wigan Athletic FC offered Baddrol a trial, but this was neither denied nor confirmed by Wigan officials. The rumour would later eventually be dismissed as false.

=== Sabah FC ===
After playing for Kedah for almost 16 years, Baddrol signed for Sabah on a free transfer at the age of 33. He made his home debut on 4 April 2022 against Negeri Sembilan.

On 10 April 2022, he scored his first goal against Sarawak United of the 2022 Super League game at the Sarawak State Stadium, Sarawak.

Baddrol bade his farewell to Sabah after having played his last match for the club in a 4–0 home win against Sri Pahang on 15 July 2023, a day after his departure was confirmed. He made 42 appearances and scored 15 goals in all competitions with Sabah.

== International career ==
Baddrol Bakhtiar, alongside his teammates Abdul Hadi Abdul Hamid, Mohd Sabre Mat Abu and Mohd Khyril Muhymeen Zambri, Muhammad Shafiq Jamal and Mohd Bunyamin Umar earned their first call-up in 2005 to the Malaysia U-20 team. He made his youth international match debut in AFC Youth Championship 2006 qualifying round on 12 December 2005 against Myanmar at Kuala Lumpur. Malaysia beat Myanmar 4–2. After qualifying to the final round in Bangalore, Baddrol however scored an own goal and Malaysia went down to Vietnam 1–2 in their opening match on 30 October 2006.

Baddrol was a part of Malaysia U-19 squad for the 2007 Champions Youth Cup. His action in a match against Chelsea wooed the Chelsea coaching staff who gave him a chance to train at Stamford Bridge.

Baddrol was called up by Malaysia U-23 national coach K.Rajagobal for 2009 Southeast Asian Games in Vientiane, Laos. He scored 3 goals throughout the tournament to assist the national U-23 sides to win the gold medal for the first time after 20 years since the team won it in 1989.

He made his full international debut against Kenya on 12 August 2009. He scored his first goal for the senior team in a match against Uzbekistan on 18 November 2009.

Baddrol was called up again by Ong Kim Swee to play for 2011 Southeast Asian Games squad in Jakarta, Indonesia. He was chosen as captain for the team and managed to score 3 goals throughout the tournament en route to final match against host Indonesia which the game tied at 1–1 after extra time. During penalty shootout, Baddrol scored the decisive penalty kick and raising the team to win the gold medal twice consecutively after the last winning on 2009 SEA Games edition.

In 2018 Asian Games, he was selected as one of the overage players for the Malaysia U-23 team. He captained the team throughout the tournament and create an upset in a 2–1 win over South Korea U-23 team.

== Political career ==
Immediately after leaving Sabah FC, Baddrol returned to his home state, Kedah, and switched his career to politics by joining the Malaysian Islamic Party (PAS). Baddrol stated his purpose for joining PAS is to defend the leadership of Datuk Seri Sanusi Md Nor, the Menteri Besar of Kedah at that time. He was named as a candidate for Gurun in the 2023 Kedah state election representing the Perikatan Nasional ticket. He won and became the Gurun assemblyman.

== Election results ==
Kedah State Legislative Assembly
Year	Constituency	Candidate	Votes	Pct	Opponent(s)	Votes	Pct	Ballots cast	Majority	Turnout
2023	N22 Gurun	Baddrol Bakhtiar (PAS)	17,771	61.37%	Firdaus Johari (PKR)	11,187	38.63%	29,203	6,584	70.73%

== Career statistics ==
=== Club ===
As of 15 July 2023

Appearances and goals by club, season and competition
Club	Season	League			Cup		League Cup		Other		Total	
Club	Season	Division	Apps	Goals	Apps	Goals	Apps	Goals	Apps	Goals	Apps	Goals
Kedah	2005-06	Malaysia Premier League	–		–			0	–			0
Kedah	2006-07	Malaysia Super League		3		2		2	–			7
Kedah	2007-08	Malaysia Super League		8		2		2	7 (Note: Appearances in 2008 AFC Cup.)	3		15
Kedah	2009	Malaysia Super League		8		1		2	6 (Note: Appearances in 2009 AFC Cup.)	1		12
Kedah	2010	Malaysia Super League	26	8	9	4	10	6	–		45	18
Kedah	2011	Malaysia Super League	24	10	1	0	5	1	–		30	11
Kedah	2012	Malaysia Super League	23	3	6	0	6	1	2 (Note: Appearances in 2012 Malaysia Super League play-offs.)	1	37	5
Kedah	2013	Malaysia Premier League	19	3	2	0	6	0	–		27	3
Kedah	2014	Malaysia Premier League	16	4	4	1	10	4	–		30	9
Kedah	2015	Malaysia Premier League	20	5	2	0	10	0	–		32	5
Kedah	2016	Malaysia Super League	19	3	5	1	10	2	–		34	6
Kedah	2017	Malaysia Super League	16	9	7	2	10	1	–		33	12
Kedah	2018	Malaysia Super League	20	4	2	1	2	0	–		24	5
Kedah	2019	Malaysia Super League	21	5	7	0	11	2	–		39	7
Kedah	2020	Malaysia Super League	10	0	–		1	0	2 (Note: Appearances in 2020 AFC Champions League qualifying play-offs.)	0	13	0
Kedah	2021	Malaysia Super League	21	7	–		6	1	–		27	8
Kedah	Total			80		14		24	17	5		123
Sabah	2022	Malaysia Super League	20	6	2	0	5	2	–		27	8
Sabah	2023	Malaysia Super League	13	4	2	1	–		–		15	5
Total			33	10	4	1	5	2	–		42	13
Career Total				90		15		26	17	5		136

=== International ===
As of 19 December 2021

Appearances and goals by national team and year
National team	Year	Apps	Goals
Malaysia	2009	7	1
Malaysia	2010	2	1
Malaysia	2011	3	1
Malaysia	2012	8	0
Malaysia	2014	11	1
Malaysia	2015	6	1
Malaysia	2016	14	0
Malaysia	2017	6	0
Malaysia	2019	1	0
Malaysia	2021	6	1
Total		64	6

=== International goals ===
Scores and results list Malaysia's goal tally first.

#	Date	Venue	Opponent	Score	Result	Competition
1.	18 November 2009	Bukit Jalil National Stadium, Kuala Lumpur, Malaysia	Uzbekistan	1–2	1–3	2011 AFC Asian Cup qualification
2.	27 February 2010	Bukit Jalil National Stadium, Kuala Lumpur, Malaysia	Yemen	1–0	1–0	Friendly
3.	18 June 2011	Sultan Mohammad IV Stadium, Kota Bharu, Malaysia	Myanmar	2–0	2–0	Friendly
4.	20 September 2014	Shah Alam Stadium, Shah Alam, Malaysia	Cambodia	4–1	4–1	Friendly
5.	17 November 2015	Shah Alam Stadium, Shah Alam, Malaysia	United Arab Emirates	1–2	1–2	2018 FIFA World Cup qualification
6.	9 October 2021	Amman International Stadium, Amman, Jordan	Uzbekistan	1–3	1–5	Friendly

=== U23 International goals ===
#	Date	Venue	Opponent	Score	Result	Competition
1.	2 December 2009	New Laos National Stadium, Vientiane	Timor-Leste	2–0	11–0 (W)	2009 SEA Games
2.	19 December 2009	New Laos National Stadium, Vientiane	Laos	1–0	3–1 (W)	2009 SEA Games
3.	21 December 2009	New Laos National Stadium, Vientiane	Laos	2–1	3–1 (W)	2009 SEA Games
4.	21 October 2011	Mỹ Đình National Stadium, Hanoi	Myanmar	2–1	2–1 (W)	2011 VFF CUP
5.	23 October 2011	Mỹ Đình National Stadium, Hanoi	Vietnam	1–1	1–1 (D)	2011 VFF CUP
6.	9 November 2011	Gelora Bung Karno Stadium	Thailand	2–1	2–1 (W)	2011 SEA Games
7.	13 November 2011	Gelora Bung Karno Stadium	Cambodia	2–0	4–1 (W)	2011 SEA Games
8.	13 November 2011	Gelora Bung Karno Stadium	Cambodia	3–0	4–1 (W)	2011 SEA Games

== Personal life ==
Baddrol was born in Sarawak and currently living in Ambangan Heights, Sungai Petani, Kedah. Baddrol's parents are from Negeri Sembilan, his father being a soldier in the Angkatan Tentera Malaysia (ATM).

== Honours ==
Kedah FA

- Malaysia Super League (2): 2006–2007, 2007–2008
- FA Cup Malaysia (4): 2007, 2008, 2017, 2019
- Malaysia Cup (3): 2007, 2008, 2016
- Malaysia Premier League (2): 2005–06, 2015
- Malaysia Charity Shield: 2017

International

- SEA Games (2): 2009, 2011
- AFF Championship: 2014 runner up
- AFF U-20 Youth Championship: 2007 runner-up

Individual

- PFAM Player of the Month: August 2016, February 2017, June 2019
- FAM Football Awards – Best Midfielder: 2010, 2017, 2021
- FAM Football Awards – Most Valuable Player: 2017
- FAM Football Awards – Local Top Scorer: 2021
- Malaysia Super League Team of the Season: 2019
- Kedah All-time Top Goalscorer

=== Awards and recognition ===
- Kedah
  - Companion of the Ahli Cemerlang Semangat Jerai Kedah (ASK) (2008)
  - Bintang Semangat Jerai (BSJ) (2006)
