= 2018 Kedah FA season =

Kedah
2018 season
- President: Mukhriz Mahathir
- Manager: Syed Khairul Anuar
- Head coach: Nidzam Adzha
- Stadium: Darul Aman Stadium (Capacity: 25,000)
- Malaysia Super League: 6th
- Charity Shield: Runners-up
- Malaysia FA Cup: Round 3
- Malaysia Cup: Group stage
- Top goalscorer: League: Sandro (8); All: Sandro (10)
Home colours	Away colours

The 2018 season was Kedah's 10th season in the Malaysia Super League since its inception in 2004. They also participated in Malaysia FA Cup and Malaysia Cup.

== Key Events ==
=== Pre-season ===
On 3 December 2017, it was reported that two Kedah footballers & coach were alleged match fixing and have their statement taken by the police. This was after 6 Kedah footballers and coach Nidzam Adzha Yusoff after were accused by a fan on Facebook of throwing the Malaysia Cup final match on Nov 4.

On 11 December 2017, it was announced that former Kedah assistant head coach Ramon Marcote has returned to the side for the 2018 season, this time as the head coach.

== First team squad ==
As of 6 February 2018.

No.	Name	Nat	Date of birth (age)	Signed from
Goalkeepers
1	Abdul Hadi Abdul Hamid	(Malaysia)	25 February 1987 (age 38)	Youth system
21	Asri Muhamad	(Malaysia)	2 October 1998 (age 27)	Youth system
25	Ifwat Akmal	(Malaysia)	10 August 1996 (age 29)	Youth system
31	Syazwan Jamil	(Malaysia)	3 March 1997 (age 28)	Youth system
60	Ramadhan Hamid	(Malaysia)	16 February 1994 (age 31)	(Malaysia) Kelantan
Defenders
2	Syawal Nordin	(Malaysia)	25 March 1993 (age 32)	(Malaysia) Harimau Muda
4	Álvaro Silva	(Philippines)	30 March 1984 (age 41)	(Vietnam) Hà Nội
5	Norfiqrie Talib	(Malaysia)	31 January 1996 (age 30)	Youth system
13	Khairul Helmi Johari	(Malaysia)	31 March 1988 (age 37)	Youth system
15	Rizal Ghazali	(Malaysia)	1 October 1992 (age 33)	(Malaysia) Perlis
17	Syazwan Tajudin	(Malaysia)	7 January 1994 (age 32)	(Malaysia) Harimau Muda B
24	Asri Mardzuki	(Malaysia)	12 May 1994 (age 31)	Youth system
Midfielders
7	Baddrol Bakhtiar	(Malaysia)	1 February 1988 (age 38)	Youth system
8	Liridon Krasniqi	(Kosovo)	1 January 1992 (age 34)	(Turkey) Fethiyespor
10	Sandro	(Brazil)	1 October 1983 (age 42)	(Brazil) ABC Futebol Clube
14	Akram Mahinan	(Malaysia)	19 January 1993 (age 33)	(Malaysia) Johor Darul Ta'zim
16	Amirul Hisyam Awang Kechik	(Malaysia)	5 May 1995 (age 30)	(Malaysia) Harimau Muda B
18	Abdul Halim Saari	(Malaysia)	14 November 1994 (age 31)	Youth system
22	Syazwan Zainon	(Malaysia)	13 November 1989 (age 36)	(Malaysia) Felda United
23	Hanif Dzahir	(Malaysia)	15 January 1994 (age 32)	Youth system
27	Ariff Farhan	(Malaysia)	14 July 1996 (age 29)	(Malaysia) Harimau Muda A
28	Zulfahamzie Tarmizi	(Malaysia)	24 February 1996 (age 29)	Youth system
30	Andik Vermansyah	(Indonesia)	23 November 1991 (age 34)	(Malaysia) Selangor
35	Hidhir Idris	(Malaysia)	29 May 1997 (age 28)	Youth system
36	Fadzrul Danel	(Malaysia)	14 January 1998 (age 28)	Youth system
Strikers
9	Paulo Rangel	(Brazil)	4 February 1985 (age 40)	(Thailand) Nakhon Ratchasima
11	Zafuan Azeman	(Malaysia)	10 June 1999 (age 26)	(Malaysia) Perlis
19	Farhan Roslan	(Malaysia)	3 December 1996 (age 29)	Youth system
20	Akhyar Rashid	(Malaysia)	1 May 1999 (age 26)	Youth system
34	Akmal Azmi	(Malaysia)	9 April 1998 (age 27)	Youth system

== Transfers ==
=== In ===
1st leg

N	P	Nat.	Name	Age	Moving From	Type	Transfer window	Reference
	FW	(Malaysia)	Zafuan Azeman	18	(Malaysia) Perlis	End of contract	Pre-Season	
	MF	(Malaysia)	Zulfahamzie Tarmizi	21	Youth system	Promoted	Pre-Season	
	DF	(Malaysia)	Norfiqrie Talib	21	Youth system	Promoted	Pre-Season	
	GK	(Malaysia)	Asri Muhamad	21	Youth system	Promoted	Pre-Season	
	MF	(Malaysia)	Akhyar Rashid	18	Youth system	Promoted	Pre-Season	
	MF	(Philippines)	Álvaro Silva	33	(Vietnam) Hà Nội	Free Transfer	Pre-Season	
	FW	(Spain)	Pablo Pallarès	30	(Spain) Ponferradina	Free Transfer	Pre-Season	
	MF	(Indonesia)	Andik Vermansyah	26	(Malaysia) Selangor	Free Transfer	Pre-Season	

2nd leg

N	P	Nat.	Name	Age	Moving From	Type	Transfer window	Reference
60	GK	(Malaysia)	Ramadhan Hamid	24	(Malaysia) Kelantan	Undisclosed	Mid-Season	
9	FW	(Brazil)	Paulo Rangel	33	(Thailand) Nakhon Ratchasima	Undisclosed	Mid-Season	
36	MF	(Malaysia)	Fadzrul Danel	20	Youth system	Promoted		

=== Out ===
1st leg

N	P	Nat.	Name	Age	Moving to	Type	Transfer window	Reference
3	DF	(Malaysia)	Fitri Omar	32	(Malaysia) Terengganu	End of contract	Pre-Season	
4	DF	(Australia)	Zac Anderson	26	(Malaysia) PKNS	End of contract	Pre-Season	
9	FW	(Denmark)	Ken Ilsø	30	(Malaysia) Penang	End of contract	Pre-Season	
14	FW	(Malaysia)	Ahmad Fakri Saarani	28	(Malaysia) Melaka United	End of contract	Pre-Season	
20	FW	(Malaysia)	Syafiq Ahmad	22	(Malaysia) Johor Darul Ta'zim	End of contract	Pre-Season	
21	GK	(Malaysia)	Farhan Abu Bakar	24	(Malaysia) Petaling Jaya Rangers	Loan	Pre-Season	
26	FW	(Malaysia)	Syazuan Hazani	23	(Malaysia) Petaling Jaya Rangers	End of contract	Pre-Season	

2nd leg

N	P	Nat.	Name	Age	Moving to	Type	Transfer window	Reference
9	FW	(Spain)	Pablo Pallarès	31	Free agent	Free Transfer	Mid-Season	
26	DF	(Malaysia)	Osman Yusoff	24	(Malaysia) Negeri Sembilan	Free Transfer	Mid-Season	

== Friendlies ==
Win Draw Loss

=== Pre-season and friendlies ===
30 December 2017 Friendly	Kedah U21 (Malaysia)	1–4	(Malaysia) Kedah	Alor Setar
		Report		Stadium: Sultan Abdul Halim Stadium

21 January 2018 Friendly	Penang (Malaysia)	1–2	(Malaysia) Kedah	Batu Kawan
21:00 UTC+08:00	Alafi 11'		Akmal Azmi 17'; Pallarès 73'	Stadium: Penang State Stadium

24 January 2018 Friendly	Kedah (Malaysia)	1–3	(Thailand) Suphanburi	Alor Setar
21:00 UTC+08:00	Pallarès 19' (pen.)		Noppol 8'; Comvalius 60'; Janepob 74'	Stadium: Darul Aman Stadium

27 January 2018 Friendly	Kedah (Malaysia)	2–0	(Malaysia) UKM	Sintok
21:00 UTC+08:00	Akhyar 27'; Sandro 73'			Stadium: UUM Stadium

=== Suramadu Super Cup 2018 ===
8 January 2018 SSC 2018	Persela Lamongan (Indonesia)	2–2	(Malaysia) Kedah	East Java
				Stadium: Gelora Bangkalan Stadium

10 January 2018 SSC 2018	Persija Jakarta (Indonesia)	1–1	(Malaysia) Kedah	East Java
				Stadium: Gelora Bangkalan Stadium

12 January 2018 SSC 2018	Madura United (Indonesia)	2–2	(Malaysia) Kedah	East Java
				Stadium: Gelora Bangkalan Stadium

== Competitions ==
=== Malaysia Super League ===
==== League table ====
Pos	Team	Pld	W	D	L	GF	GA	GD	Pts
4	Pahang	22	9	7	6	35	21	+14	34
5	Terengganu	22	10	4	8	32	31	+1	34
6	Kedah	22	9	5	8	37	36	+1	32
7	Melaka United	22	9	4	9	33	38	−5	31
8	Selangor	22	7	6	9	35	39	−4	27

Source: FAM, FMLLP
Rules for classification: 1) Points; 2) Goal difference; 3) Number of goals scored.

==== Results by matchday ====
Matchday	1	2	3	4	5	6	7	8	9	10	11	12	13	14	15	16	17	18	19	20	21	22
Ground	A	H	A	A	A	H	A	H	A	A	H	A	H	H	A	H	H	A	H	H	A	H
Result	L	L	W	W	L	W	D	D	D	W	W	W	L	L	W	W	W	L	L	D	D	L
Position	9	11	8	6	7	6	6	6	6	6	5	5	5	5	4	4	3	4	4	5	6	6

Updated to match(es) played on 29 July 2018. Source: Kedah FA
A = Away; H = Home; W = Win; D = Draw; L = Loss

==== Results summary ====
Overall								Home						Away					
Pld	W	D	L	GF	GA	GD	Pts	W	D	L	GF	GA	GD	W	D	L	GF	GA	GD
22	9	5	8	37	36	+1	32	4	2	5	19	18	+1	5	3	3	18	18	0

==== Matches ====
Win Draw Loss

The fixtures for the 2018 Malaysia Super League season were announced on 11 January 2018.

3 February 2018 1/Charity Shield	Johor Darul Ta'zim	2–1	Kedah	Johor Bahru
21:00 MYT	Figueroa 29'; Marcos António 58'	Report	Pallarès 15'; Ariff (yellow card) 22'; Sandro (yellow card) 56'	Stadium: Tan Sri Dato' Haji Hassan Yunos Stadium; Attendance: 23,030; Referee: Mohd Zohri Tajuddin

7 February 2018 2	Kedah	1–3	Perak	Alor Setar
21:00 MYT	Rizal (yellow card) 45+5'; Liridon (yellow card) 76' (yellow-red card) 82'; Sandro 80' (pen.); Syazwan T. (yellow card) 86'; Akram (yellow card) 90+1'	Report	Azhan (yellow card) 12'; Gilmar 21'; Leandro (yellow card) 45+3'; Cornthwaite (yellow card) 79', (goal) 87'; Kenny (yellow card) 90+3'; Nazirul 90+5'	Stadium: Darul Aman Stadium; Referee: Zamzaidi Katimin

11 February 2018 3	PKNP	0–1	Kedah	Batu Kawan
16:45 MYT		Report	Syazwan T. (yellow card) 17'; Akhyar 85'	Stadium: Penang State Stadium; Referee: Nazmi Nasaruddin

25 February 2018 4	PKNS	3–4	Kedah	Shah Alam
21:00 MYT	Faris 32'; Mahali 47', 90+5'	Report	Liridon 35' (pen.), 57'; Akram (yellow card) 53'; Sandro (yellow card) 66'; Reuben 70' (o.g.); Alvaro (yellow card) 72'; Amirul (yellow card) 87'; Ariff 90+2'	Stadium: Shah Alam Stadium; Referee: Mohd Amirul Izwan Yaacob

10 March 2018 5	Kuala Lumpur	4–3	Kedah	Cheras
21:00 MYT	Zaquan 3', (yellow card) 47'; Guilherme 62'; Paulo Josué 82'; Akbarov (yellow card) 90+3'; Ashri 90+6'	Report	Pallarès 11', 90+1'; Liridon 50'	Stadium: KLFA Stadium; Referee: Nazmi Nasaruddin

13 April 2018 6	Kedah	4–0	Selangor	Alor Setar
21:00 MYT	Syazwan Zainon 4'; Akram (yellow card) 53'; Sandro 45', 65'; Rizal Ghazali (yellow card) 55'; Akram Mahinan 83'; Akhyar Rashid (yellow card) 85'	Report	Kanan (yellow card) 20'	Stadium: Darul Aman Stadium; Referee: Nazmi Nasaruddin

27 April 2018 7	Terengganu	1–1	Kedah	Kuala Terengganu
21:00 MYT	Latiff (yellow card) 20'; Zonjić (yellow card) 28'; Partiban 44'	Report	Rizal (yellow card) 62'; Baddrol 64'; Álvaro Silva (yellow card) 88'	Stadium: Sultan Ismail Nasiruddin Shah Stadium; Referee: Wan Mohamad Tarmizi

1 May 2018 8	Kedah	3–3	Negeri Sembilan	Alor Setar
21:00 MYT	Liridon 2'; Syazwan Z. 27'; Sandro 31' (pen.); Helmi (yellow card) 86'	Report	Thanabalan 4'; Vélez 48'; Júnior (yellow card) 63', (goal) 87' (pen.); Ferris (yellow card) 90+3'	Stadium: Darul Aman Stadium; Referee: Mohd Amirul Izwan Yaacob

5 May 2018 9	Pahang	2–2	Kedah	Kuantan
21:00 MYT	Vathanaka 11'; Safuwan 40'; Patrick Cruz (yellow card) 90+3'	Report	Sandro 18', 51'; Akram (yellow card) 23'; Halim (yellow card) 64'; Rizal (yellow card) 90+3'	Stadium: Darul Makmur Stadium; Referee: Razlan Jeffri Ali

13 May 2018 10	Negeri Sembilan	1–2	Kedah	Paroi
21:00 MYT	Kim Do-heon (yellow card) 64'; Alex Moraes (yellow card) 74'; Júnior 76'	Report	Liridon 8'; Akhyar 16'	Stadium: Tuanku Abdul Rahman Stadium; Referee: Suhaimi Mat Hassan

22 May 2018 11	Kedah	2–0	Pahang	Alor Setar
22:00 MYT	Baddrol 45'; Helmi (yellow card) 57'; Liridon 89'	Report	Davies (yellow card) 43'; Safuwan (yellow card) 55'	Stadium: Darul Aman Stadium; Referee: Muhammad Nazmi Nasaruddin

26 May 2018 12	Selangor	1–2	Kedah	Cheras
22:00 UTC+08:00	Syahmi 70'; Evan (yellow card) 71'; Amri (yellow card) 79'	Report	Baddrol 28'; Liridon 58'; Akram (yellow card) 78'	Stadium: KLFA Stadium; Attendance: TBD; Referee: Fitri Maskon

1 June 2018 13	Kedah	0–2	Melaka United	Alor Setar
22:00 MYT		Report	Zubovich 43'; Jeon Woo-young (yellow card) 87'; Lee Chang-hoon 90+1'	Stadium: Darul Aman Stadium; Referee: Zulkarnain Zakaria

5 June 2018 14	Kedah	1–2	Kelantan	Alor Setar
22:00 MYT	Paulo Rangel 26'; Sandro (yellow card) 83'	Report	Nik Azli 56'; Danial Ashraf 60'; Nik Akif (yellow card) 90+2'	Stadium: Darul Aman Stadium; Referee: Nagor Amir Noor Mohamed

8 June 2018 15	Kelantan	0–1	Kedah	Alor Setar
22:00 MYT	Khairul Asyraf (yellow card) 20'; Duyshobekov (yellow card) 61' (yellow-red card) 90+6'	Report	Rizal (yellow card) 29'; Paulo Rangel 45+1'; Andik Vermansyah (yellow card) 90+5'	Stadium: Darul Aman Stadium; Referee: Wan Mohamad Tarmizi

20 June 2018 16	Kedah	3–2	Kuala Lumpur	Alor Setar
21:00 MYT	Andik Vermansyah 14'; Akhyar 26'; Paulo Rangel 32'	Report	De Paula 45', (yellow card) 53'; Syafwan 88'; Hisyamudin (yellow card) 90+1'	Stadium: Darul Aman Stadium; Referee: Suhaimi Mat Hassan

26 June 2018 17	Kedah	2–0	PKNS	Alor Setar
21:00 MYT	Paulo Rangel 17'; Andik Vermansyah 41'	Report	Daniel (yellow card) 30'; Shahrul Azhar (yellow card) 64'	Stadium: Darul Aman Stadium; Referee: Fitri Maskon

10 July 2018 18	Melaka United	4–1	Kedah	Krubong
21:00 MYT	Khair 34'; Gopinathan 38', 62'; Ifedayo 85'	Report	Paulo Rangel 52' (pen.); Halim (yellow card) 56'; Syawal (yellow card) 59'	Stadium: Hang Jebat Stadium; Referee: Mohd Nafeez Abdul Wahab

13 July 2018 19	Kedah	1–2	Johor Darul Ta'zim	Alor Setar
21:00 MYT	Álvaro Silva (yellow card) 12'; Paulo Rangel (yellow card) 57' (yellow-red card) 80'; Sandro 79' (pen.), (yellow card) 82'	Report	Cabrera 22'; Hariss (yellow card) 31'; Fernando Márquez 39'; Corbin-Ong (yellow card) 54' (yellow-red card) 65'; Farizal (yellow card) 83'	Stadium: Darul Aman Stadium; Referee: Mohd Amirul Izwan Yaacob

17 July 2018 20	Kedah	1–1	Terengganu	Alor Setar
21:00 MYT	Baddrol 44'	Report	Kamal Azizi 62'	Stadium: Darul Aman Stadium; Referee: Razlan Jeffri Ali

22 July 2018 21	Perak	0–0	Kedah	Ipoh
21:00 MYT	Idris (yellow card) 45'; Syazwan (yellow card) 67'	Report	Zafuan (yellow card) 79'	Stadium: Perak Stadium; Referee: Mohd Nafeez Abdul Wahab

29 July 2018 22	Kedah	1–3	PKNP	Alor Setar
21:00 MYT	Sandro 5'	Report	Krjauklis 24'; Kim 33', 64'; Azraei (yellow card) 75'	Stadium: Darul Aman Stadium; Referee: Ku Alauddin Ku Muhammad

=== Malaysia FA Cup ===
Win Draw Loss

2 March 2018 Round 2	Kedah	1–0 (a.e.t.)	Negeri Sembilan	Alor Setar
21:00 MYT	Alvaro (yellow card) 65'; Baddrol 120'	Report	Aizulridzwan (yellow card) 27'; Júnior (yellow card) 31'; Hazrul (yellow card) 64'	Stadium: Darul Aman Stadium; Referee: Wan Mohamad Tarmizi

17 March 2018 Round 3	Pahang	1–0	Kedah	Kuantan
21:00 MYT	Davies (yellow card) 22'; Sumareh 45+1'; Azam (yellow card) 55'	Report	Ariff (yellow card) 45'; Akram (yellow card) 90+5'	Stadium: Darul Makmur Stadium; Referee: Suhaizi Shukri

=== Malaysia Cup ===
==== Group stage ====
Pos	Team	Pld	W	D	L	GF	GA	GD	Pts	Qualification	JDT	KEL	MIFA	KED
1	Johor Darul Ta'zim	6	3	0	3	11	7	+4	9	Advance to knockout stage	—	1–0	1–2	5–1
2	Kelantan	6	2	2	2	3	3	0	8	Advance to knockout stage	1–0	—	0–0	2–0
3	MISC-MIFA	6	2	2	2	8	9	−1	8		0–3	2–0	—	2–2
4	Kedah	6	2	2	2	9	12	−3	8		3–1	0–0	3–2	—

Updated to match(es) played on 16 September 2018. Source: FAM FMLLP

Win Draw Loss

5 August 2018 1	Kedah	0–0	Kelantan	Alor Setar
21:00 MYT		Report	Haqim (yellow card) 33'; Shafiq (yellow card) 78'	Stadium: Darul Aman Stadium; Referee: Zulkarnain Zakaria

10 August 2018 2	Johor Darul Ta'zim	5–1	Kedah	Larkin
21:00 MYT	Márquez 13'; Hazwan (yellow card) 25', (goal) 72'; Insa 46'; Cabrera 82'; Kunanlan 90+1'	Report	Sandro 35'	Stadium: Tan Sri Dato' Haji Hassan Yunos Stadium; Referee: Razlan Joffri Ali

18 August 2018 3	Kedah	3–2	MISC-MIFA	Alor Setar
21:00 MYT	Krasniqi 44' (pen.); Halim (yellow card) 45+1'; Sandro 66'; Hidhir (yellow card) 90+4'	Report	Sherman 28'; Elizeu (yellow card) 43'; Syazwan 48' (o.g.); Wan Syukri (yellow card) 54'; Satrunan (yellow card) 84'	Stadium: Darul Aman Stadium; Referee: Mohd Amirul Izwan Yaacob

26 August 2018 4	MISC-MIFA	2–2	Kedah	Petaling Jaya
21:00 MYT		Report		Stadium: Petaling Jaya Stadium; Referee: Suresh Jayaraman

31 August 2018 5	Kedah	3–1	Johor Darul Ta'zim	Alor Setar
21:00 MYT		Report		Stadium: Darul Aman Stadium

16 September 2018 6	Kelantan	2–0	Kedah	Kota Bharu
21:00 MYT		Report		Stadium: Sultan Muhammad IV Stadium; Referee: Razlan Joffri Ali

== Statistics ==
=== Appearances and goals ===
No.	Pos.	Name	League		FA Cup		Malaysia Cup		Total		Discipline	
No.	Pos.	Name	Apps	Goals	Apps	Goals	Apps	Goals	Apps	Goals	Yellow card	Red card
1	GK	(Malaysia) Hadi Hamid	0	0	0	0	4	0	4	0	0	0
2	DF	(Malaysia) Syawal Nordin	12	0	0	0	1	0	13	0	1	0
4	DF	(Philippines) Álvaro Silva	12(1)	0	2	0	6	0	20(1)	0	6	0
5	DF	(Malaysia) Norfiqrie Talib	7(1)	0	0	0	6	0	13(1)	0	0	0
7	MF	(Malaysia) Baddrol Bakhtiar	20	4	2	1	2	0	24	5	1	0
8	MF	(Kosovo) Liridon Krasniqi	14	7	2	0	4	3	20	10	3	1
9	FW	(Brazil) Paulo Rangel	7(1)	5	0	0	1(1)	0	8(2)	5	1	1
10	FW	(Brazil) Sandro	14(4)	8	2	0	6	4	23(4)	12	5	0
11	FW	(Malaysia) Zafuan Azeman	0(2)	0	0	0	1(1)	0	1(3)	0	1	0
13	DF	(Malaysia) Khairul Helmi	16(1)	0	2	0	4	0	22(1)	0	2	0
14	MF	(Malaysia) Akram Mahinan	17(3)	1	2	0	5	0	24(3)	1	6	0
15	DF	(Malaysia) Rizal Ghazali	20	0	2	0	1	0	23	0	0	0
16	MF	(Malaysia) Amirul Hisyam	3(12)	0	0(1)	0	1(2)	0	4(15)	0	1	0
17	DF	(Malaysia) Syazwan Tajudin	7(5)	0	0(1)	0	3	0	10(6)	0	2	0
18	MF	(Malaysia) Halim Saari	12	0	0	0	5	0	17	0	1	0
19	FW	(Malaysia) Farhan Roslan	1(4)	0	1(1)	0	0	0	2(5)	0	0	0
20	FW	(Malaysia) Akhyar Rashid	8(9)	3	1	0	2	1	11(9)	4	1	0
21	GK	(Malaysia) Asri Muhamad	2(1)	–2	0	0	0	0	2(1)	–2	0	0
22	MF	(Malaysia) Syazwan Zainon	13(4)	2	0(1)	0	2(4)	0	15(9)	2	1	0
23	MF	(Malaysia) Hanif Dzahir	0(1)	0	0	0	1(1)	0	1(2)	0	0	0
24	DF	(Malaysia) Asri Mardzuki	6(3)	0	0	0	4	0	10(3)	0	0	0
25	GK	(Malaysia) Ifwat Akmal	13	+4	2	0	0	0	15	+4	0	0
27	MF	(Malaysia) Ariff Farhan	9(2)	1	2	0	0	0	11(2)	1	1	0
28	MF	(Malaysia) Zulfahamzie Tarmizi	0	0	0	0	0(1)	0	0(1)	0	0	0
30	MF	(Indonesia) Andik Vermansyah	13	2	1	0	2(2)	0	16(2)	2	1	0
31	GK	(Malaysia) Syazwan Jamil	0	0	0	0	0	0	0	0	0	0
34	FW	(Malaysia) Akmal Azmi	0(2)	0	0	0	0(1)	0	0(3)	0	0	0
35	MF	(Malaysia) Hidhir Idris	4(2)	0	0	0	1(1)	0	5(3)	0	1	0
36	MF	(Malaysia) Fadzrul Danel	1(1)	0	0	0	2	0	3(1)	0	0	0
60	GK	(Malaysia) Ramadhan Hamid	7(1)	–2	0	0	2	–4	9(1)	–6	0	0
#		Own goals	–	1	–	0	–	0	–	0	–	–
Left club during season
9	FW	(Spain) Pablo Pallarès	7	3	0	0	0	0	7	3	0	0
26	DF	(Malaysia) Osman Yusoff	0	0	0	0	0	0	0	0	0	0

Last updated: 16 September 2018.
Source: Kedah FA

=== Clean sheets ===
Rnk	No.	Player	League	FA Cup	Malaysia Cup	Total
1	60	(Malaysia) Ramadhan Hamid	3	0	1	4
2	21	(Malaysia) Asri Muhamad	1	0	0	1
2	25	(Malaysia) Ifwat Akmal	0	1	0	1
