= Sabre Abu =

Malaysian footballer

Personal information
- Full name: Mohd Sabre bin Mat Abu
- Date of birth: 8 August 1987 (age 39)
- Place of birth: Parit Buntar, Malaysia
- Height: 1.66 m (5 ft 5 1/2 in)
- Position: Right back

Youth career
- 2005–2006: Kedah

Senior career*
Years	Team	Apps	(Gls)
2006–2013	Kedah	118	(3)
2014	PDRM	18	(0)
2015–2016	Kedah	3	(0)
2017	PKNS	0	(0)
2017	→ Negeri Sembilan (loan)	4	(0)
2018	Sarawak	14	(0)

International career^{‡}
2005–2006	Malaysia U21	5	(0)
2007–2009	Malaysia U23	6	(0)
2009–2012	Malaysia	14	(0)
Medal record
Men's football
Representing Malaysia
ASEAN Championship
Winner	2010 AFF Championship
Malaysia U23
SEA Games
First place	2009 Vientiane	Football
- * Club domestic league appearances and goals as of 2 February 2018 ‡ National team caps and goals as of 24 January 2017

Mohd Sabre bin Mat Abu (born 8 August 1987) is a Malaysian footballer who last plays for Sarawak as a right back.

Sabre was a member of Malaysia U23 and Malaysia U20 squad. He is known for his high work rate and versatility as he can be deployed as fullback, midfielder, winger and even as a striker.

== Club career ==
Sabre was promoted to the senior after the 2006 SUKMA where Azraai Khor scout his potential alongside his teammates Baddrol Bakhtiar, Khyril Muhymeen, Shafiq Jamal, Bunyamin Umar and Hadi Hamid from national Malaysia U20.

== International career ==
For international appearance, Sabre earned his first call-up in 2005 to the Malaysia U20 squad of K. Rajagopal's side in AFC Youth Championship 2006 qualifying and final round in Bangalore, India. He later taken into the Malaysia U23 squad for 2008 Olympic Games qualification.

In November 2010, Sabre was called up to the Malaysia national squad by coach K. Rajagopal for the 2010 AFF Suzuki Cup. Malaysia won the 2010 AFF Suzuki Cup title for the first time in their history.

== Career statistics ==
=== Club ===
As of 26 June 2018

Club	Season	League		Cup		League Cup		Continental		Total	
Club	Season	Apps	Goals	Apps	Goals	Apps	Goals	Apps	Goals	Apps	Goals
Negeri Sembilan (loan)	2017	4	0	0	0	1	0	–	–	5	0
Negeri Sembilan (loan)	Total	4	0	0	0	1	0	0	0	5	0
Sarawak	2018	14	0	1	0	0	0	–	–	15	0
Sarawak	Total	14	0	1	0	0	0	0	0	15	0
Career total		0	0	0	0	0	0	0	0	0	0

== Honours ==
=== Club ===
Kedah

- Malaysia Cup (3): 2007, 2008, 2016
- Malaysia Super League (2): 2006–2007, 2007–2008
- Malaysia FA Cup (2): 2007, 2008
- Malaysia Premier League (1): 2005–06

PDRM

- Malaysia Premier League (1): 2014

=== International ===
Malaysia U18

- Lion City Cup: 2005

Malaysia U23

- 2009 SEA Games: (gold) 2009

Malaysia

- 2010 AFF Championship: 2010
