= Pablo Pallarés =

Spanish footballer

Personal information
- Full name: Pablo Pallarés Marzo
- Date of birth: 12 January 1987 (age 39)
- Place of birth: Gandia, Spain
- Height: 1.90 m (6 ft 3 in)
- Position: Forward

Team information
- Current team: Svay Rieng
- Number: 9

Youth career
- 1999–2006: Valencia

Senior career*
Years	Team	Apps	(Gls)
2006–2007	Atlético Madrid C		
2007–2008	Palencia	23	(1)
2008–2009	Dénia	27	(1)
2009–2010	Águilas	21	(3)
2010	Alcoyano	16	(2)
2010–2011	Roquetas	36	(9)
2011–2012	Almería B	24	(3)
2011–2012	Almería	11	(0)
2012–2013	San Fernando	35	(2)
2013–2014	La Hoya Lorca	34	(17)
2014–2015	Cartagena	13	(1)
2015	Huesca	14	(1)
2015–2017	UCAM Murcia	38	(10)
2017	Ponferradina	37	(4)
2018	Kedah	8	(3)
2018–2019	Guijuelo	15	(5)
2019–2020	Badalona	8	(1)
2020	Gorica	0	(0)
2020–2021	Socuéllamos	17	(1)
2021	Olímpic Xàtiva	27	(2)
2022	Svay Rieng	11	(9)
- * Club domestic league appearances and goals as of 2 May 2022

Pablo Pallarés Marzo (born 12 January 1987) is a Spanish footballer who plays for Svay Rieng mainly as a forward.

== Club career ==
Pallarés was born in Gandia, Valencian Community. After unsuccessfully emerging through Atlético Madrid's youth ranks, he started playing as a professional in Segunda División B, starting with CF Palencia in 2007–08 (only one goal in 946 minutes of action, team relegation). In the following three seasons he played with four teams in that level, his best individual year being with CD Roquetas.

On 4 June 2011, Pallarés signed with UD Almería, playing initially for their reserves. On 13 December he made his debut with the Andalusians' first team, coming off the bench for Aarón Ñíguez in a 1–3 Copa del Rey home loss against CA Osasuna (2–4 on aggregate).

In August 2012, after appearing in roughly only one quarter of the Segunda División games in his only season, Pallarés returned to division three after joining San Fernando CD. He continued to compete in that tier in the following years, representing La Hoya Lorca CF, FC Cartagena, SD Huesca, UCAM Murcia CF and SD Ponferradina.

In January 2018, 31-year-old Pallarés moved abroad for the first time in his career, signing with Malaysia Super League club Kedah FA.
