= 2007 Malaysia FA Cup =

Piala FA

Tournament details
- Country: Malaysia
- Teams: 22

Final positions
- Champions: Kedah (2nd title)
- Runners-up: Perlis

The 2007 Malaysia FA Cup was the 18th season of the Malaysia FA Cup. The competition began on 6 February 2007, and ended with the final on 30 June 2007. Batu Kawan Stadium hosted the final match. A record 22 teams competed in the competition.

The tournament was won by Kedah, who defeated Perlis 4–2 in a penalty shoot-out.

== First round ==
Tie no	Home team	Score	Away team
1	Kelantan FA	3–1	(Federal Territories of Malaysia) DBKL
2	Sukses FC (Selangor)	0–4	Selangor PKNS
3	Melaka TMFC (Malacca)	2–0	Sarawak FA
4	KL Maju United (Federal Territories of Malaysia)	0–1	ATM FA
5	Negeri Sembilan FA	0–0 (6–5 on penalties)	PDRM FA
6	Kuala Lumpur FA (Federal Territories of Malaysia)	1–2	Johor FC
7	Penang FA	2–2 (2–4 on penalties)	(Pahang) Shahzan Muda FC
8	Proton FC (Selangor)	0–4	Perlis FA
9	Johor FA	2–0	Terengganu FA
10	KL PLUS FC (Federal Territories of Malaysia)	1–2	Kedah FA
11	Kuala Muda Naza FC (Kedah)	1–0	(Singapore) Young Lions
12	UPB-MyTeam FC (Perak)	bye	
13	Sabah FA	bye	
14	Selangor FA	bye	
15	Perak FA	bye	
16	Pahang FA	bye	

== Second round ==
Tie no	Home team	Score	Away team
1	Shahzan Muda FC (Pahang)	1–5	(Kedah) Kuala Muda Naza FC
2	Johor FA	2–2 (5–4 on penalties)	Kelantan FA
3	Melaka TMFC (Malacca)	0–3	Perlis FA
4	UPB-MyTeam FC (Perak)	3–1	Negeri Sembilan FA
5	Johor FC	3–4	Sabah FA
6	ATM FA	1–4	Selangor FA
7	Pahang FA	1–1 (4–5 on penalties)	Selangor PKNS
8	Kedah FA	1–0	Perak FA

== Quarter-finals ==
The first legs were played on 15 May and 22 May. The second legs were played on 29 May 2007.

Team 1	Agg.	Team 2	1st leg	2nd leg
Johor FA	4–1	Kuala Muda Naza FC	2–0	2–1
Sabah FA	2–5	Perlis FA	2–2	0–3
UPB-MyTeam FC	1–7	Kedah FA	1–4	0–3
Selangor FA	3–1	Selangor PKNS	2–1	1–1

== Semi-finals ==
The semi-final matches were played on 16 June and 23 June 2007.

Team 1	Agg.	Team 2	1st leg	2nd leg
Johor FA	(a) 2–2	Perlis FA	2–1	0–1
Kedah FA	3–1	Selangor FA	2–0	1–1

== Final ==
The final was held at Batu Kawan Stadium, Penang on the June 30, 2007.

2008-06-30
20:30 UTC+8

Kedah FA	0 – 0	Perlis FA
Penalties
Bunyamin (penalty scored); Hasmawi (penalty scored); Shafizan (penalty scored); Sabree (penalty scored)	4 – 2	Azi (penalty scored); Simukonda (penalty missed); Kamuzati (penalty scored); Nazaruddin (penalty missed)

Batu Kawan Stadium, Penang
Attendance: 20,874

Piala FA 2007 Winner

Kedah
Second Title
