= Shazuan Ashraf Mathews =

Malaysian footballer

Shazuan Ashraf
Personal information
- Full name: Mohd Shazuan bin Mohd Ashraf Mathews
- Date of birth: 12 May 1992 (age 34)
- Place of birth: Selangor, Malaysia
- Height: 1.75 m (5 ft 9 in)
- Positions: Attacking midfielder; striker

Team information
- Current team: Hanelang
- Number: 30

Youth career
- 2010: Selangor
- 2011: Perak
- 2012: Kedah

Senior career*
Years	Team	Apps	(Gls)
2011	Perak	11	(2)
2012–2013	Kedah	13	(0)
2014	Penang	21	(0)
2015–2016	Kedah	7	(0)
2017	Felcra FC	11	(1)
2018–	Hanelang	0	(0)
- * Club domestic league appearances and goals as of 23 January 2017

Mohd Shazuan bin Mohd Ashraf Mathews (born 12 May 1992) is a Malaysian footballer who plays for Hanelang in Malaysia FAM League. His preferred position is as a winger or as a striker.

== Career ==
Before signing to play with Perak in 2011, he was playing with the Selangor FA Presidents Cup team in 2010. He was also selected for trial in Nike Malaysia's 'The Chance', a program to select players to enter the Nike Academy in London.

He was registered and played with the Perak President's Cup team in 2011, but was also frequently picked for the Perak senior team by head coach Norizan Bakar. He scored his first goal for Perak senior team against Perlis FA on 25 May 2011.

== Honours ==
Kedah FA

- Malaysia Cup: 2016
