= Shafizan Hashim =

Malaysian footballer

- Shafizan with Kedah FA in 2008

Personal information
- Full name: Shafizan bin Hashim
- Date of birth: 2 September 1982 (age 44)
- Place of birth: Kedah, Malaysia
- Height: 1.72 m (5 ft 8 in)
- Position: Defender

Team information
- Current team: Kedah FA
- Number: 6

Senior career*
Years	Team	Apps	(Gls)
2002–2003	Kedah JKR	21	(2)
2004–2011	Kedah FA	78	(6)
2012	Johor FC	18	(0)
2013	Felda United	21	(0)
2014–2016	Kedah FA	51	(2)

International career^{‡}
2008	Malaysia	2	(0)
- * Club domestic league appearances and goals as of January 17, 2016 ‡ National team caps and goals as of January 17, 2016

Shafizan Hashim (born 2 September 1982) is a Malaysian former professional footballer who played as a defender.

== Career ==
Hashim a.k.a. "Pelam" has been promoted to the Kedah premier team by Mirandinha starting from 2004 after he spent his football talent with another most success football club in Kedah, Kedah JKR; a club of Public Works Department Malaysia for a couple years. Shafizan was promoted as a regular left-side defender of the team after Shariman Che Omar departed from Kedah squad. On 30 June 2007, he helped Kedah FA win the Malaysian FA Cup after beating Perlis FA 4–2 on penalties (both teams tied at 0–0 after extra time) in Batu Kawan Stadium.

Hashim made his international senior debut against India on 22 July 2008 as a starting eleven. He also represents the Malaysia XI (also known as Malaysia B that represent Malaysia for non 'A' matches) squad against Chelsea F.C. replacing Mohd Fauzi Nan at Shah Alam Stadium on 29 July 2008.

== Achievements ==
- Malaysia Super League Champion: 2006/07, 2007/08
- Malaysia Premier League Champion: 2005/06, 2015

- Runner-up: 2005

- Malaysia FA Cup Champion: 2006/07, 2007/08
- Malaysia Cup Champion: 2006/07, 2007/08, 2016

- Runner-up: 2004, 2015
