= 2008 Malaysia FA Cup =

Piala FA

Tournament details
- Country: Malaysia
- Teams: 28

Final positions
- Champions: Kedah FA (3rd title)
- Runners-up: Selangor FA

Tournament statistics
- Matches played: 57

The 2008 Malaysia FA Cup was the 19th season of the Malaysia FA Cup. The competition began on 19 February 2008, and ended with the final on 21 June 2008. Shah Alam Stadium hosted the final match.

The tournament was won by title holders Kedah FA, who beat Selangor FA 3–2 in the final.

The cup winner were guaranteed a place in the 2009 AFC Cup.

== First round ==
The first legs were played on 19 February 2008. The second legs were played on 4 March 2008.

Team 1	Agg.	Team 2	1st leg	2nd leg
Harimau Muda	1–2	Proton FC	0–1	1–1
Pahang FA	6–2	ATM FA	3–2	0–3
Negeri Sembilan FA	1–1^{A}	Johor FA	0–0	1–1
Selangor FA	7–3	DPMM FC	5–1	2–2
Penang FA	2–0	UPB-MyTeam FC	2–0	0–0
MP Muar	0–3	Malacca FA	0–3	0–0
Sarawak FA	9–1	PBDKT T-Team FC	6–0	1–3
PKNS FC	4–5	Kedah FA	2–5	0–2
Perlis FA	2–5	KL PLUS FC	2–2	3–0
Kuala Muda Naza FC	5–5^{A}	Kelantan FA	3–1	4–2
Felda United FC	4–2	KSK Tambun Tulang FC	3–1	1–1
KOR RAMD FC	1–11	PDRM FA	1–5	6–0
Kuala Lumpur FA	4–0	Shahzan Muda FC	3–0	0–1
Johor FC	2–3	Perak FA	2–0	3–0

== Second round ==
The first legs were played on 21 March 2008. First leg match for Penang FA and Kuala Muda Naza FC were played on 23 March 2008. The second legs were played on 4 March 2008.

Team 1	Agg.	Team 2	1st leg	2nd leg
Terengganu FA	5–1	Negeri Sembilan FA	1–0	1–4
Kuala Lumpur FA	3–5	Felda United FC	2–5	0–1
Proton FC	4–6	Malacca FA	3–2	4–1
Kedah FA	5–0	Sarawak FA	3–0	0–2
Pahang FA	2–0	KL PLUS FC	0–0	0–2
Perak FA	5–6	Selangor FA	4–4	2–1
PDRM FA	3–4	Sabah FA	2–1	1–3
Penang FA	1–2	Kuala Muda Naza FC	1–0	0–2

== Quarter-finals ==
The first legs were played on 8 April 2008. The second legs were played on 22 April 2008.

Team 1	Agg.	Team 2	1st leg	2nd leg
Malacca FA	3–10	Kedah FA	1–4	6–2
Pahang FA	4–1	Sabah FA	3–1	0–1
Kuala Muda Naza FC	3–4	Selangor FA	1–0	4–2
Terengganu FA	4–2	Felda United FC	3–1	1–1

== Semi-finals ==
The first legs were played on 14 June 2008. The second legs were played on 17 June 2008.

=== First leg ===
2008-06-14
20:45

Kedah FA	4 – 1	Pahang FA
Shafiq 1'; Khyril Muhymeen 28'; Fauzi 46'; Samransak 81'		Rosdi 68'

Darul Aman Stadium, Alor Star

2008-06-14
20:45

Selangor FA	2 – 1	Terengganu FA
Shukor 68'; Safee 88'		Ashaari 25'

Shah Alam Stadium, Shah Alam

=== Second leg ===
2008-06-17
20:45

Pahang FA	0 – 2	Kedah FA
		Khyril Muhymeen 9'; Badrol 46'

Darulmakmur Stadium, Kuantan

Kedah won 6–1 on aggregate

2008-06-17
20:45

Terengganu FA	1 – 1	Selangor FA
Ashaari 69'		R. Surendran 48'

Sultan Ismail Nasiruddin Shah Stadium, Kuala Terengganu

Selangor won 3–2 on aggregate

== Final ==
2008-06-21
20:45

Selangor FA	2 – 3	Kedah FA
Amirul Hadi 9'; Seator 71' (pen.)		Fadly 1'; Khyril Muhymeen 33'; Shafiq 50'

Shah Alam Stadium, Shah Alam
Referee: Lee Chong Seng (Perak)

== Winners ==
Piala FA 2008 Winner

Kedah
Third Title
