= 2020 Johor Darul Ta'zim F.C. season =

Johor Darul Ta'zim
2020 season
- Chairman: Tunku Tun Aminah Sultan Ibrahim
- Head Coach: Luciano Figueroa (until 21 October); Benjamín Mora (from 21 October)
- Stadium: Sultan Ibrahim Stadium
- Super League: 1st
- FA Cup: Cancelled
- Malaysia Cup: Cancelled
- Charity Shield: Winners
- Champions League: Group stage (withdrew)
- Top goalscorer: League: Gonzalo Cabrera (8); All: Gonzalo Cabrera (9)
| Home colours | Away colours |

The 2020 season was Johor Darul Ta'zim Football Club's 47th season in club history and 8th season in the Malaysia Super League after rebranding their name from Johor FC.

== Season overview ==
Johor Darul Ta'zim FC won their 2019 Malaysia Super League to become the first Malaysian club to win the league titles for six consecutive seasons (2014–2019). JDT returns to win the 2019 Malaysia Cup after defeating Kedah 3-0 at Bukit Jalil National Stadium on 2 November 2019.

JDT failed to qualify for quarter final in Malaysia FA Cup after lost with 0-1 to PKNS at third round on 17 April 2019.

Johor Darul Ta’zim (JDT) FC suffered a shocking 1-0 defeat to PJ City FC in the Malaysia Super League 2019 at the Larkin Stadium on 16 July 2019 ending their hopes of going a fulls season undefeated!

Having won a record sixth Malaysia Super League title couple of weeks back, JDT were just two matches away from repeating their 2016 feat of coasting through a full league season undefeated.

JDT have lost for the first time at the Tan Sri Dato’ Haji Hassan Yunos Stadium in Larkin since April 14, 2012 — a run that lasted for 75 matches (82, if you include their seven wins as Johor FC). JDT had also won 28 consecutive home league matches before lost to Petaling Jaya City FC.

In Asia, JDT in the first time and to become the first Malaysian club to qualify for AFC Champions League Group Stage. JDT create the first victory after defeating defending champions Kashima Antlers 1-0 at Tan Sri Dato' Haji Hassan Yunos Stadium on 8 May 2019.

== Squad ==
As of 21 Dec 2019.

| Squad No. | Name | Nationality | Date of birth (age) | Previous club | Contract since | Contract end |
Goalkeepers
| 1 | Farizal Marlias | (Malaysia) | 29 June 1986 (age 40) | (Malaysia) Selangor FA | 2014 | |
| 24 | Izham Tarmizi | (Malaysia) | 24 April 1991 (age 35) | (Malaysia) Harimau Muda A | 2014 | 2021 |
| 26 | Haziq Nadzli | (Malaysia) | 6 January 1998 (age 28) | (Malaysia) PDRM FA | 2017 | 2022 |
Defenders
| 2 | Matthew Davies | (Malaysia) (Australia) | 7 February 1995 (age 31) | (Malaysia) Pahang FA | 2020 | |
| 3 | Adam Nor Azlin | (Malaysia) | 5 January 1996 (age 30) | (Malaysia) Selangor FA | 2018 | 2019 |
| 6 | Syazwan Andik | (Malaysia) | 4 August 1996 (age 30) | (Malaysia) Kuala Lumpur FA | 2019 | |
| 7 | Aidil Zafuan | (Malaysia) | 3 August 1987 (age 39) | (Malaysia) ATM FA | 2013 | |
| 12 | S. Kunanlan | (Malaysia) | 15 September 1986 (age 40) | (Malaysia) Selangor FA | 2015 | 2019 |
| 20 | Azrif Nasrulhaq | (Malaysia) | 27 May 1991 (age 35) | (Malaysia) Selangor FA | 2016 | 2021 |
| 22 | La'Vere Corbin-Ong | (Malaysia) (Canada) (England) (Barbados) | 21 April 1991 (age 35) | (Netherlands) Go Ahead Eagles | 2018 | 2019 |
| 27 | Fadhli Shas | (Malaysia) | 21 January 1991 (age 35) | (Slovenia) FC ViOn Zlaté Moravce | 2014 | 2021 |
| 33 | Maurício | (Brazil) | 20 September 1988 (age 38) | (Italy) S.S. Lazio | 2019 | 2019 |
| 41 | Feroz Baharuddin | (Malaysia) | 2 April 2000 (age 26) | Youth Team | 2020 | 2020 |
| 44 | Mohammad Qairul | (Malaysia) | 1 May 2004 (age 22) | (Malaysia) Kelantan F.C. | 2020 | 2020 |
| | Kiko Insa | (Malaysia) | 25 January 1988 (age 38) | (Thailand) Bangkok Glass FC | 2018 | |
Midfielders
| 4 | Afiq Fazail | (Malaysia) | 29 September 1994 (age 32) | (Malaysia) Harimau Muda B | 2015 | 2020 |
| 5 | Syamer Kutty Abba | (Malaysia) | 1 October 1997 (age 29) | (Portugal) Vilaverdense F.C. | 2018 | 2022 |
| 11 | Gonzalo Cabrera | (Argentina) | 15 January 1989 (age 37) | (Saudi Arabia) Al-Faisaly FC | 2017 | |
| 14 | Hariss Harun | (Singapore) | 19 November 1990 (age 35) | (Singapore) Home United | 2014 | 2021 |
| 17 | Ramadhan Saifullah Usman | (Malaysia) | 9 December 2000 (age 25) | Youth Team | 2020 | 2020 |
| 18 | Leandro Velázquez | (Argentina) | 10 May 1989 (age 37) | (Colombia) Rionegro Águilas | 2019 | |
| 21 | Nazmi Faiz | (Malaysia) | 16 August 1994 (age 32) | (Malaysia) Johor Darul Ta'zim II | 2017 | |
| 30 | Natxo Insa | (Malaysia) (Spain) | 9 June 1986 (age 40) | (Spain) Levante UD | 2017 | |
| 42 | Arif Aiman Hanapi | (Malaysia) | 4 May 2002 (age 24) | Youth Team | 2020 | 2020 |
| 43 | Amirul Husaini Zamri | (Malaysia) | 4 October 2000 (age 26) | Youth Team | 2020 | 2020 |
| 45 | Gary Steven Robbat | (Malaysia) | 3 September 1992 (age 34) | (Malaysia) Johor Darul Ta'zim II | 2020 | |
| 88 | Liridon Krasniqi | (Malaysia) | 1 January 1992 (age 34) | (Malaysia) Melaka United | 2020 | |
Strikers
| 9 | Hazwan Bakri | (Malaysia) | 19 June 1991 (age 35) | (Malaysia) Selangor FA | 2017 | 2020 |
| 19 | Akhyar Rashid | (Malaysia) | 1 May 1999 (age 27) | (Malaysia) Kedah FA | 2019 | |
| 28 | Syafiq Ahmad | (Malaysia) | 28 June 1995 (age 31) | (Malaysia) Pulau Pinang | 2018 | |
| 29 | Safawi Rasid | (Malaysia) | 5 March 1997 (age 29) | (Malaysia) Terengganu F.C. II | 2017 | 2022 |

== Friendly matches ==
Win Draw Loss

| 11 January 2020 1 | Johor Darul Ta'zim (Malaysia) | 4–0 | (Malaysia) Kuching | Johor, Malaysia |
| 20:45 (UTC+8) | Diogo Luís Santo 35'; Hazwan Bakri 65'; Leandro Velázquez 69'; Liridon Krasniqi 71' | Report | | Stadium: Sultan Ibrahim Stadium |

| 15 January 2020 2 | Johor Darul Ta'zim (Malaysia) | 4–0 | (Singapore) Home United | Johor, Malaysia |
| 20:45 (UTC+8) | Gonzalo Cabrera 3'; Diogo Luís Santo 12'; Syafiq Ahmad 72'; Liridon Krasniqi 83' | Report | | Stadium: Sultan Ibrahim Stadium |

| 20 February 2020 3 | Johor Darul Ta'zim (Malaysia) | 7–0 | (Singapore) Balestier Khalsa | Johor, Malaysia |
| 20:45 (UTC+8) | Diogo Luís Santo 20' 63' 65'; Aidil Zafuan 53'; Maurício 61'; Leandro Velázquez 72'; Hazwan Bakri 78' | | | Stadium: Sultan Ibrahim Stadium |

=== Tour of UAE ===
| 20 January 2020 1 | Riga (Latvia) | 2–0 | (Malaysia) Johor Darul Ta'zim | Dubai, United Arab Emirates |
| 18:00 (UTC+4) | Roman Debelko 35'; Felipe Brisola 88' | Report | | Stadium: The Sevens Stadium |

| 23 January 2020 2 | Dibba Al-Fujairah (United Arab Emirates) | 0–1 | (Malaysia) Johor Darul Ta'zim | Fujairah, United Arab Emirates |
| | | | Diogo Luís Santo 4' | Stadium: Fujairah Club Stadium |

| 26 January 2020 3 | Turkmenistan | 1–2 | (Malaysia) Johor Darul Ta'zim | Dubai, United Arab Emirates |
| | Metdayev Akmammet 53' | | Safawi Rasid 39' (pen.); Diogo Luís Santo 61' (pen.) | Stadium: Jebel Ali COE Stadium |

| 29 January 2020 4 | Žilina (Slovakia) | 1–2 | (Malaysia) Johor Darul Ta'zim | Dubai, United Arab Emirates |
| | Vahan Bichakhchyan 39' | | Gonzalo Cabrera 2' 19' | Stadium: The Sevens Stadium |

| 30 January 2020 5 | Emirates Club (United Arab Emirates) | 3–2 | (Malaysia) Johor Darul Ta'zim | Dubai, United Arab Emirates |
| | Syazwan Andik 39' (o.g.); Saeed Salem 44'; Tommy Tobar 58' | | Syafiq Ahmad 66'; Amirul Husaini 76' | Stadium: Emirates Club Stadium |

=== Mid-season Friendlies ===
| 14 August 2020 Friendly | Johor Darul Ta'zim (Malaysia) | 3–0 | (Malaysia) PDRM FA | Johor |
| | Nazmi Faiz 38'; Ramadhan Saifullah 69' 89' | | | Stadium: Sultan Ibrahim Stadium |

| 18 August 2020 Friendly | Johor Darul Ta'zim (Malaysia) | 8–0 | (Malaysia) UiTM F.C. | Johor |
| | Diogo Luís Santo 11' 23' 34'; Gonzalo Cabrera 29'; Leandro Velázquez 49' 51'; Nazmi Faiz 77'; Syamer Kutty Abba 82' (pen.) | | | Stadium: Sultan Ibrahim Stadium |

== Competitions ==
=== Overview ===
| Competition | First match | Last match | Starting round | Final position | Record | | | | | | | |
| Competition | First match | Last match | Starting round | Final position | Pld | W | D | L | GF | GA | GD | Win % |
|---|---|---|---|---|---|---|---|---|---|---|---|---|
| Malaysia Super League (Note: Includes the Charity Shield.) | 28 February 2020 | 10 October 2020 | Matchday 1 | Winners | 11 | 9 | 2 | 0 | 33 | 8 | +25 | 81.82 |
| Malaysia Cup | 6 November 2020 | | Round of 16 | Cancelled | 1 | 1 | 0 | 0 | 1 | 0 | +1 | 100.00 |
| AFC Champions League | 12 February 2020 | 3 March 2020 | Group stage | Withdrew | 2 | 1 | 0 | 1 | 3 | 6 | −3 | 50.00 |
| Total | | | | | 14 | 11 | 2 | 1 | 37 | 14 | +23 | 78.57 |

Last updated: 6 November 2020
Source: Competitions

=== Malaysia Super League ===
==== Table ====
| Pos | Team | Pld | W | D | L | GF | GA | GD | Pts | Qualification or relegation |
|---|---|---|---|---|---|---|---|---|---|---|
| 1 | Johor Darul Ta'zim (C, Q) | 11 | 9 | 2 | 0 | 33 | 8 | +25 | 29 | Qualification for AFC Champions League group stage |
| 2 | Kedah (Q) | 11 | 7 | 1 | 3 | 20 | 13 | +7 | 22 | Qualification for AFC Cup group stage |
| 3 | Terengganu (Q) | 11 | 6 | 1 | 4 | 24 | 14 | +10 | 19 | Qualification for AFC Cup group stage |
| 4 | Perak | 11 | 5 | 3 | 3 | 21 | 19 | +2 | 18 | |
| 5 | Selangor | 11 | 4 | 5 | 2 | 26 | 19 | +7 | 17 | |

Source: Malaysian Football League
Rules for classification: 1) Points; 2) Goal difference; 3) Number of goals scored.
(C) Champions; (Q) Qualified for the phase indicated

==== Malaysia Super League fixtures and results ====
Win Draw Loss

| 28 February 2020 1 | Johor Darul Ta'zim | 1–0 | Kedah | Johor |
| 21:00 UTC+8 | Maurício 44'; Leandro Velazquez (yellow card) 25'; Aidil Zafuan (yellow card) 30' | Report | Baddrol Bakhtiar (yellow card) 5'; Hadin Azman (yellow card) 44'; Shakir Hamzah (yellow card) 49'; Renan Alves (yellow card) 86' | Stadium: Sultan Ibrahim Stadium; Referee: Azlan Jofri Ali |

| 7 March 2020 2 | Johor Darul Ta'zim | 2–1 | (Selangor) UiTM FC | Johor |
| 21:00 UTC+8 | Diogo Luís Santo 9'; Nazmi Faiz 69'; Fadhli Shas (yellow card) 24'; Kiko Insa (yellow card) 72' | Report | Victor Nirrennold 20'; Arif Anwar (yellow card) 37'; Rabih Ataya (yellow card) 65' | Stadium: Sultan Ibrahim Stadium; Referee: Hamdan Awang |

| 10 March 2020 3 | PDRM FA (Kuala Lumpur) | 0–1 | Johor Darul Ta'zim | Cheras |
| 21:00 UTC+8 | Nizam Rodzi (yellow card) 39'; See Tian Keat (yellow card) 54'; Amir Saiful (yellow card) 61' | Report | Diogo Luís Santo 85' (pen.) (penalty missed) 85 (yellow card) 89'; Nazmi Faiz (yellow card) 81' | Stadium: Kuala Lumpur Stadium; Referee: Fairuzi Mat Desa |

| 14 March 2020 4 | Johor Darul Ta'zim | 1–1 | (Kuala Lumpur) Felda United | Johor |
| 21:00 UTC+8 | Syafiq Ahmad 21'; Gonzalo Cabrera (penalty missed) 52; Maurício (yellow card) 53'; Fadhli Shas (yellow card) 73' | Report | Frederic Bulot 52'; Fadhil Idris (yellow card) 38'; Nicolas Velez (yellow card) 72'; Ezanie Mat Salleh (yellow card) 90' | Stadium: Sultan Ibrahim Stadium; Referee: Zohri Tajuddin |

| 28 August 2020 5 | Pahang | 2–3 | Johor Darul Ta'zim | Kuantan |
| 21:00 UTC+8 | Faisal Halim 40'; Herold Goulon 45'; Muslim Ahmad (yellow card) 37'; Gopi Rizqi (yellow card) 37'; Dinesh Rajasingam (yellow card) 38'; Ashar Al Aafiz (yellow card) 90' | Report | Leandro Velazquez 5'; Ramadhan Saifullah 14'; Gonzalo Cabrera 35' (pen.) (yellow card) 22'; Nazmi Faiz (yellow card) 73'; Maurício (yellow card) 85' | Stadium: Darul Makmur Stadium; Referee: Zulkarnain Bin Zakaria |

| 4 September 2020 6 | Johor Darul Ta'zim | 7–0 | Perak | Johor |
| 21:00 UTC+8 | Afiq Fazail 22'; Gonzalo Cabrera 36' 45' (pen.) 61'; Ramadhan Saifullah 45+2'; Safawi Rasid 79'; Akhyar Rashid 83'; Nazmi Faiz (yellow card) 66' | Report | Thierry Bin (yellow card) 52' | Stadium: Sultan Ibrahim Stadium; Referee: Nazmi Nasaruddin |

| 11 September 2020 7 | Terengganu | 0–1 | Johor Darul Ta'zim | Terengganu |
| 21:00 UTC+8 | Dominique Da Sylva (yellow card) 16'; Azalinullah Alias (yellow card) 63' | Report | Safawi Rasid 5'; Maurício (yellow card) 55'; Leandro Velazquez (yellow card) 62' | Stadium: Sultan Ismail Nasiruddin Shah Stadium; Referee: Wan Mohamad Tarmizi |

| 19 September 2020 8 | Johor Darul Ta'zim | 6–1 | Selangor | Johor |
| 21:00 UTC+8 | Safawi Rasid 45+2' 49' (pen.) (yellow card) 57'; Diogo Luís Santo 63'; Gonzalo Cabrera 66'; Ramadhan Saifullah 71' 75'; Nazmi Faiz (yellow card) 45+5'; Syamer Kutty Abba (yellow card) 90+2' (yellow-red card) 90+4' | Report | Rufino Segovia 81'; Ashmawi Yakin (yellow card) 37'; Nicholas Swirad (yellow card) 48' | Stadium: Sultan Ibrahim Stadium; Referee: Zulkarnain Zakaria |

| 25 September 2020 9 | Petaling Jaya City (Selangor) | 2–2 | Johor Darul Ta'zim | Selangor |
| 21:00 UTC+8 | Christie Jayaseelan 38'; K. Gurusamy 45+2' (yellow card) 24'; R. Barathkumar (yellow card) 17'; P. Rajes (yellow card) 19' | Report | Safawi Rasid 36'; Gonzalo Cabrera 45+5' (pen.); Fadhli Shas (yellow card) 15'; Farizal Marlias (yellow card) 45'; Diogo Luís Santo (yellow card) 63' | Stadium: Petaling Jaya Stadium; Referee: Nazmi Nasaruddin |

| 2 October 2020 10 | Johor Darul Ta'zim | 4–1 | Sabah | Johor |
| 21:00 UTC+8 | Diogo Luís Santo 38' (yellow card) 64'; Safawi Rasid 58' 81' (yellow card) 57'; Leandro Velazquez 84' | Report | Dennis Buschening 74'; Dendy Lowa (yellow card) 59'; Randy Baruh (yellow card) 75' | Stadium: Sultan Ibrahim Stadium; Referee: Mohd Fairuzi Mat Desa |

| 10 October 2020 11 | Melaka United (Malacca) | 0–5 | Johor Darul Ta'zim | Melaka |
| 21:00 UTC+8 | Wan Amirul Afiq (yellow card) 18' | Report | Leandro Velazquez 70' (pen.); Syafiq Ahmad 75' (yellow card) 63' Aidil Zafuan 79'; Fernando Rodriguez 85'; Gonzalo Cabrera 90+3'; Fadhli Shas (yellow card) 65' | Stadium: Hang Jebat Stadium; Referee: Noor Azriel bin Baharuddin |

=== Malaysia Cup ===
| 6 November 2020 Round 1 | Johor Darul Ta'zim F.C. | 1–0 | (Sarawak) Kuching FA | Johor |
| | Arif Aiman Hanapi 19'; Leandro Velazquez (yellow card) 39'; Diogo Luís Santo (yellow card) 66' | Report | Joseph Kalang Tie (yellow card) 81'; Tommy Mawat (yellow card) 90' | Stadium: Tan Sri Dato' Haji Hassan Yunos Stadium; Referee: Noor Azriel Baharuddin |

| 12 November 2020 QF | Johor Darul Ta'zim F.C. | Cancelled | Kuala Lumpur FA | Johor |
| | | | | Stadium: Tan Sri Dato' Haji Hassan Yunos Stadium |

=== AFC Champions League ===
==== Table ====
| Pos | Team | Pld | W | D | L | GF | GA | GD | Pts | Qualification | VIS | SUW | GZE | JDT |
|---|---|---|---|---|---|---|---|---|---|---|---|---|---|---|
| 1 | (Japan) Vissel Kobe | 4 | 2 | 0 | 2 | 4 | 5 | −1 | 6 | Advance to knockout stage | — | 0–2 | 0–2 | ~~5–1~~ |
| 2 | (South Korea) Suwon Samsung Bluewings | 4 | 1 | 2 | 1 | 3 | 2 | +1 | 5 | Advance to knockout stage | 0–1 | — | 0–0 | ~~25 Nov~~ |
| 3 | (China) Guangzhou Evergrande | 4 | 1 | 2 | 1 | 4 | 4 | 0 | 5 | | 1–3 | 1–1 | — | ~~4 Dec~~ |
| 4 | (Malaysia) Johor Darul Ta'zim | 0 | 0 | 0 | 0 | 0 | 0 | 0 | 0 | Withdrew, results expunged (Note: Johor Darul Ta'zim were unable to travel to Qatar to play the final four matches of the group stage after their application for permission to travel was refused by the Malaysian government due to COVID-19 pandemic travel restrictions. They were considered to have withdrawn from the competition, and their results were expunged.) | ~~1 Dec~~ | ~~2–1~~ | ~~19 Nov~~ | — |

Source: AFC
Notes:

Win Draw Loss

==== Group stage ====
| 12 February 2020 Matchday 1 | Vissel Kobe (Japan) | 5–1 | (Malaysia) Johor Darul Ta'zim | Kobe, Hyogo Prefecture |
| 19:00 UTC+9 | Keijiro Ogawa 12', 58', 72'; Kyogo Furuhashi 28' (yellow card) 45' (substituted off) 76'; Douglas 65' (substituted off) 72'; Noriaki Fujimoto (substituted on) 72'; Junya Tanaka (substituted on) 76'; Andrés Iniesta (substituted off) 88'; Ryo Hatsuse (substituted on) 88' | Live Report; Stat Report | S. Kunanlan (yellow card) 15' (substituted off) 61'; Safawi 27' (pen.) (yellow card) 45'; Afiq Fazail (yellow card) 31'; Adam Nor Azlin (substituted on) 61'; Nazmi Faiz (substituted off) 67'; Natxo Insa (substituted on) 67'; Cabrera (substituted off) 81'; Syafiq Ahmad (substituted on) 81' | Stadium: Noevir Stadium Kobe; Referee: Alireza Faghani (Iran) |

| 3 March 2020 Matchday 2 | Johor Darul Ta'zim (Malaysia) | 2–1 | (South Korea) Suwon Samsung Bluewings | Johor Bahru, Johor |
| | Gonzalo Cabrera 13' (pen.); Maurício 73' (yellow card) 39'; Nazmi Faiz (yellow card) 36'; Natxo Insa (yellow card) 50'; Syamer Kutty Abba (yellow card) 78' | | Terry Antonis 51'; Min Sang-gi (yellow card) 12'; Doneil Henry (yellow card) 66' | Stadium: Sultan Ibrahim Stadium; Referee: Alireza Faghani (Iran) |

| 19 November 2020 Matchday 3 | Johor Darul Ta'zim (Malaysia) | Cancelled | (China) Guangzhou Evergrande | Doha, Qatar |
| | | | | Stadium: Khalifa International Stadium |

| 25 November 2020 Matchday 4 | Suwon Samsung Bluewings (South Korea) | Cancelled | (Malaysia) Johor Darul Ta'zim | Doha, Qatar |
| | | | | Stadium: Khalifa International Stadium |

| 1 December 2020 Matchday 5 | Johor Darul Ta'zim (Malaysia) | Cancelled | (Japan) Vissel Kobe | Doha, Qatar |
| | | | | Stadium: Khalifa International Stadium |

| 4 December 2020 Matchday 6 | Guangzhou Evergrande (China) | Cancelled | (Malaysia) Johor Darul Ta'zim | Al Wakrah, Qatar |
| | | | | Stadium: Al Janoub Stadium |

== Club statistics ==
Correct as of match played on 14 Nov 2020

=== Appearances ===
| No. | Pos. | Player | Malaysia Super League | | FA Cup | | Malaysia Cup | | ACL / AFC Cup | | Total | |
| No. | Pos. | Player | Apps. | Goals | Apps. | Goals | Apps. | Goals | Apps. | Goals | Apps. | Goals |
|---|---|---|---|---|---|---|---|---|---|---|---|---|
| 1 | GK | (Malaysia) Farizal Marlias | 11 | 0 | 0 | 0 | 0 | 0 | 2 | 0 | 13 | 0 |
| 2 | DF | (Malaysia) (Australia) Matthew Davies | 6 | 0 | 0 | 0 | 1 | 0 | 0 | 0 | 7 | 0 |
| 3 | DF | (Malaysia) Adam Nor Azlin | 0(4) | 0 | 0 | 0 | 0 | 0 | 0(1) | 0 | 5 | 0 |
| 4 | MF | (Malaysia) Afiq Fazail | 9(2) | 1 | 0 | 0 | 1 | 0 | 2 | 0 | 14 | 1 |
| 5 | MF | (Malaysia) Syamer Kutty Abba | 0(6) | 0 | 0 | 0 | 0 | 0 | 0(1) | 0 | 7 | 0 |
| 6 | DF | (Malaysia) Syazwan Andik | 0 | 0 | 0 | 0 | 0 | 0 | 0 | 0 | 0 | 0 |
| 7 | DF | (Malaysia) Aidil Zafuan | 7(1) | 1 | 0 | 0 | 1 | 0 | 1 | 0 | 9 | 1 |
| 8 | FW | (Brazil) Diogo Luís Santo | 10 | 4 | 0 | 0 | 1 | 0 | 2 | 0 | 13 | 4 |
| 9 | FW | (Malaysia) Hazwan Bakri | 0 | 0 | 0 | 0 | 0(1) | 0 | 0 | 0 | 1 | 0 |
| 11 | FW | (Syria) (Argentina) Gonzalo Cabrera | 10(1) | 8 | 0 | 0 | 1 | 0 | 2 | 1 | 14 | 9 |
| 12 | DF | (Malaysia) S. Kunanlan | 4(1) | 0 | 0 | 0 | 0 | 0 | 2 | 0 | 7 | 0 |
| 14 | MF | (Singapore) Hariss Harun | 1 | 0 | 0 | 0 | 0(1) | 0 | 1 | 0 | 3 | 0 |
| 17 | MF | (Malaysia) Ramadhan Saifullah | 3(4) | 3 | 0 | 0 | 0(1) | 0 | 1 | 0 | 9 | 3 |
| 18 | MF | (Argentina) Leandro Velazquez | 9 | 2 | 0 | 0 | 1 | 0 | 0 | 0 | 10 | 2 |
| 19 | FW | (Malaysia) Akhyar Rashid | 0(6) | 1 | 0 | 0 | 0 | 0 | 0(1) | 0 | 7 | 1 |
| 20 | DF | (Malaysia) Azrif Nasrulhaq | 0 | 0 | 0 | 0 | 0 | 0 | 0 | 0 | 0 | 0 |
| 21 | MF | (Malaysia) Nazmi Faiz | 5(3) | 0 | 0 | 0 | 0(1) | 0 | 2 | 0 | 10 | 0 |
| 22 | DF | (Malaysia) (Canada) (England) (Barbados) Corbin-Ong | 11 | 0 | 0 | 0 | 1 | 0 | 2 | 0 | 14 | 0 |
| 24 | GK | (Malaysia) Izham Tarmizi | 0 | 0 | 0 | 0 | 1 | 0 | 0 | 0 | 1 | 0 |
| 26 | GK | (Malaysia) Haziq Nadzli | 0 | 0 | 0 | 0 | 0 | 0 | 0 | 0 | 0 | 0 |
| 27 | DF | (Malaysia) Fadhli Shas | 6(2) | 0 | 0 | 0 | 0 | 0 | 1 | 0 | 9 | 0 |
| 28 | FW | (Malaysia) Syafiq Ahmad | 2(4) | 2 | 0 | 0 | 0(1) | 0 | 0(2) | 0 | 9 | 2 |
| 29 | MF | (Malaysia) Safawi Rasid | 5(2) | 7 | 0 | 0 | 0 | 0 | 2 | 1 | 9 | 8 |
| 30 | MF | (Malaysia) (Spain) Natxo Insa | 8(1) | 1 | 0 | 0 | 1 | 0 | 1(1) | 0 | 12 | 1 |
| 33 | DF | (Brazil) Maurício Nascimento | 10 | 1 | 0 | 0 | 1 | 0 | 1 | 1 | 12 | 2 |
| 35 | DF | (Malaysia) Hasbullah Abu Bakar | 0 | 0 | 0 | 0 | 0 | 0 | 0 | 0 | 0 | 0 |
| 41 | MF | (Malaysia) Feroz Baharudin | 0(1) | 0 | 0 | 0 | 0 | 0 | 0 | 0 | 1 | 0 |
| 42 | MF | (Malaysia) Arif Aiman Hanapi | 0(2) | 0 | 0 | 0 | 1 | 1 | 0 | 0 | 3 | 1 |
| 43 | MF | (Malaysia) Amirul Husaini Zamri | 0 | 0 | 0 | 0 | 0 | 0 | 0 | 0 | 0 | 0 |
| 45 | MF | (Malaysia) Gary Steven Robbat | 1(1) | 0 | 0 | 0 | 0 | 0 | 0 | 0 | 2 | 0 |
| 46 | FW | (Spain) Fernando Rodriguez | 0(1) | 1 | 0 | 0 | 0 | 0 | 0 | 0 | 1 | 0 |
| 88 | MF | (Malaysia) (Kosovo) (Albania) Liridon Krasniqi | 1(2) | 0 | 0 | 0 | 0 | 0 | 0 | 0 | 3 | 0 |
Players who have played this season but had left the club or on loan to other club

=== Top scorers ===
| Rnk | No. | Pos. | Name | League | FA Cup | Malaysia Cup | AFC Champions League | Total |
|---|---|---|---|---|---|---|---|---|
| 1 | 29 | FW | (Malaysia) Safawi Rasid | 0 | 0 | 0 | 1 | 1 |
| Own goals | | | | 0 | 0 | 0 | 0 | 0 |
| Total | | | | 0 | 0 | 0 | 1 | 1 |

=== Top assists ===
| Rnk | No. | Pos. | Name | League | FA Cup | Malaysia Cup | Asia | Total |
|---|---|---|---|---|---|---|---|---|
| | | | | 0 | 0 | 0 | 0 | 0 |
| Total | | | | 0 | 0 | 0 | 0 | 0 |

=== Discipline ===
| Rnk | No. | Player | Total | | | League | | | FA Cup | | | Malaysia Cup | | | AFC | | |
| Rnk | No. | Player | Yellow card | (yellow card) (red card) | Red card | Yellow card | (yellow card) (red card) | Red card | Yellow card | (yellow card) (red card) | Red card | Yellow card | (yellow card) (red card) | Red card | Yellow card | (yellow card) (red card) | Red card |
|---|---|---|---|---|---|---|---|---|---|---|---|---|---|---|---|---|---|
| 1 | 4 | (Malaysia) Afiq Fazail | 1 | 0 | 0 | 0 | 0 | 0 | 0 | 0 | 0 | 0 | 0 | 0 | 1 | 0 | 0 |
| 1 | 12 | (Malaysia) S. Kunanlan | 1 | 0 | 0 | 0 | 0 | 0 | 0 | 0 | 0 | 0 | 0 | 0 | 1 | 0 | 0 |
| 1 | 29 | (Malaysia) Safawi Rasid | 1 | 0 | 0 | 0 | 0 | 0 | 0 | 0 | 0 | 0 | 0 | 0 | 1 | 0 | 0 |
| Totals | | | 3 | 0 | 0 | 0 | 0 | 0 | 0 | 0 | 0 | 0 | 0 | 0 | 3 | 0 | 0 |

== Transfers and contracts ==
=== In ===
| No. | Pos. | Name | Age | Moving from | Type | Transfer Date | Transfer fee |
|---|---|---|---|---|---|---|---|
| 34 | MF | (Kosovo) (Albania) (Malaysia) Liridon Krasniqi | 34 | (Malaysia) Melaka United | Transfer | 20 December 2019 | Free |
| 2 | DF | (Malaysia) (Australia) Matthew Davies | 31 | (Malaysia) Pahang FA | Transfer | 17 February 2020 | Free |

=== Out ===
| No. | Pos. | Name | Age | Moving to | Type |
|---|---|---|---|---|---|
| 2 | DF | (Malaysia) Dominic Tan | 29 | (Thailand) Police Tero | Free |
| 18 | FW | (Argentina) Fernando Andrés Márquez | 38 | (Argentina) Defensa y Justicia | Loan |
| | DF | (Malaysia) Mahali Jasuli | 37 | (Malaysia) Petaling Jaya City FC | Free |
| 29 | FW | (Malaysia) Safawi Rasid | 29 | (Portugal) Portimonense SC | Loan |

=== Retained ===
| Position | Player | Ref |
