= 2019 Johor Darul Ta'zim F.C. season =

Johor Darul Ta'zim
2019 season
- Chairman: Tunku Tun Aminah Sultan Ibrahim
- Head Coach: Luciano Figueroa
- Stadium: Larkin Stadium
- Super League: 1st
- Charity Shield: Winners
- FA Cup: Third round
- Malaysia Cup: Winners
- Champions League: Group stage
- Top goalscorer: League: Diogo (14); All: Safawi Rasid (20)
- Highest home attendance: 22,510 vs Perak (2 February 2019)
- Lowest home attendance: 4,860 vs Kashima Antlers (8 May 2019)
- Biggest win: 5–0 vs PKNP (H), 23 August 2019, Malaysia Cup
- Biggest defeat: 0–2 vs Gyeongnam (A), 22 May 2019, Champions League
Home colours	Away colours

The 2019 season is Johor Darul Ta'zim Football Club's 46th season in club history and 7th season in the Malaysia Super League after rebranding their name from Johor FC.

The season was also marked by the club’s historic return to Asia’s premier club competition for the first time since the 1996–97 season. They qualified for the tournament after finishing as champions in Malaysia Super League.

== Season overview ==
The 2019 season was a landmark one for Johor Darul Ta'zim, as the club won a sixth consecutive Malaysia Super League title and reclaimed the Malaysia Cup, completing the league-and-cup double, though they fell short in both the Malaysia FA Cup and the AFC Champions League.

=== Super League ===
JDT began their Malaysia Super League campaign on 1 February and concluded it on 21 July, finishing as champions with 53 points from 22 matches, recording 16 wins, 5 draws, and 1 defeat, with 49 goals scored and 19 conceded for a goal difference of +30. The title was JDT's sixth consecutive Malaysia Super League crown, making them the first Malaysian club to win the league six seasons in a row (2014–2019). JDT's only league defeat came on 16 July, when they suffered a shock 1–0 home loss to PJ City at the Larkin Stadium, ending their hopes of going through the entire season unbeaten.

=== FA Cup ===
In contrast to their league success, JDT's Malaysia FA Cup campaign was brief and disappointing. After progressing through the early rounds, JDT were eliminated in the third round on 17 April 2019, losing 0–1 to PKNS. The early exit meant JDT failed to qualify for the quarter-finals, denying them any chance of challenging for the cup.

=== Malaysia Cup ===
The Malaysia Cup was where JDT reclaimed the trophy they had won for the first time in 2017, after falling short in the 2018 edition. JDT dominated the group stage, topping their group with 5 wins and 1 draw from 6 matches, scoring 19 goals and conceding 8 for a goal difference of +11. Notable group results included a 5–0 thrashing and a 4–2 win, underlining JDT's attacking prowess throughout the competition. In the knockout stages, JDT defeated Kedah 3–0 in the final, played on 2 November at the Bukit Jalil National Stadium, to claim their second Malaysia Cup title and complete the league-and-cup double.

=== AFC Champion League ===
JDT made their historic return to Asia's premier club competition, competing in the 2019 AFC Champions League for the first time since their debut in the 1996–97 Asian Club Championship. Drawn into Group E alongside Japanese champions Kashima Antlers, South Korean side Gyeongnam FC, and Chinese club Shandong Luneng, JDT opened their campaign on 5 March with a 2–1 away defeat to Kashima at the Kashima Soccer Stadium. Their first home match on 12 March ended in a 1–1 draw against Gyeongnam at the Larkin Stadium. JDT's breakthrough came on 8 May, when they defeated defending champions Kashima Antlers 1–0 at home, recording not only JDT's first ACL win but also the first-ever AFC Champions League victory for any Malaysian club. Despite this historic result, JDT finished bottom of Group E with 4 points from 6 matches, recording 1 win, 1 draw, and 4 defeats, with 4 goals scored and 8 conceded for a goal difference of −4, and were eliminated at the group stage.

== Squad ==
As of 21 November 2018.

Squad No.	Name	Nationality	Date of birth (age)	Previous club	Contract since	Contract end
Goalkeepers
1	Farizal Marlias	(Malaysia)	29 June 1986 (age 40)	(Malaysia) Selangor FA	2014	
24	Izham Tarmizi	(Malaysia)	24 April 1991 (age 35)	(Malaysia) Harimau Muda A	2014	2021
26	Haziq Nadzli	(Malaysia)	6 January 1998 (age 28)	(Malaysia) PDRM FA	2017	2022
Defenders
2	Dominic Tan	(Malaysia)	12 March 1997 (age 29)	(Portugal) Vilaverdense F.C.	2016	2019
3	Adam Nor Azlin	(Malaysia)	5 January 1996 (age 30)	(Malaysia) Selangor FA	2018	2019
6	Syazwan Andik	(Malaysia)	4 August 1996 (age 30)	(Malaysia) Kuala Lumpur FA	2019	2019
7	Aidil Zafuan	(Malaysia)	3 August 1987 (age 39)	(Malaysia) ATM FA	2013	2019
12	S. Kunanlan	(Malaysia)	15 September 1986 (age 40)	(Malaysia) Selangor FA	2015	2019
20	Azrif Nasrulhaq	(Malaysia)	27 May 1991 (age 35)	(Malaysia) Selangor FA	2016	2021
22	La'Vere Corbin-Ong	(Malaysia) (Canada)	21 April 1991 (age 35)	(Netherlands) Go Ahead Eagles	2018	2019
27	Fadhli Shas	(Malaysia)	21 January 1991 (age 35)	(Slovenia) FC ViOn Zlaté Moravce	2014	2021
30	Kiko Insa	(Malaysia) (Spain)	25 January 1988 (age 38)	(Thailand) Bangkok Glass FC	2018	
33	Maurício	(Brazil)	20 September 1988 (age 38)	(Italy) S.S. Lazio	2019	2019
Midfielders
4	Afiq Fazail	(Malaysia)	29 September 1994 (age 32)	(Malaysia) Harimau Muda B	2015	2020
5	Natxo Insa	(Malaysia) (Spain)	9 June 1986 (age 40)	(Spain) Levante UD	2017	
11	Gonzalo Cabrera	(Argentina) (Iraq)	15 November 1989 (age 36)	(Saudi Arabia) Al-Faisaly FC	2017	
13	Gary Steven Robbat	(Malaysia)	3 September 1992 (age 34)	(Malaysia) Harimau Muda A	2015	2020
14	Hariss Harun	(Singapore)	19 November 1990 (age 35)	(Singapore) Home United	2014	2021
16	Syamer Kutty Abba	(Malaysia)	1 October 1997 (age 29)	(Portugal) Vilaverdense F.C.	2018	2022
18	Leandro Velázquez	(Argentina)	10 May 1989 (age 37)	(Colombia) Rionegro Águilas	2019	
21	Nazmi Faiz	(Malaysia)	16 August 1994 (age 32)	(Malaysia) Johor Darul Ta'zim II	2017	
Strikers
8	Diogo	(Brazil)	26 May 1987 (age 39)	(Thailand) Buriram United F.C.	2019	
9	Hazwan Bakri	(Malaysia)	19 June 1991 (age 35)	(Malaysia) Selangor FA	2017	2020
19	Akhyar Rashid	(Malaysia)	1 May 1999 (age 27)	(Malaysia) Kedah FA	2019	
28	Syafiq Ahmad	(Malaysia)	28 June 1995 (age 31)	(Malaysia) Kedah Darul Aman	2018	
29	Safawi Rasid	(Malaysia)	5 March 1997 (age 29)	(Malaysia) Terengganu F.C. II	2017	2022

== Friendly matches ==
Win Draw Loss

11 January 2019 Friendly	Johor Darul Ta'zim (Malaysia)	5–0	(Singapore) Home United	Johor Bahru, Malaysia
21:00 UTC+8	Gonzalo Cabrera 8'; Aarón Ñíguez (penalty scored) 13'; Hariss Harun 45'; Ahmad Hazwan Bakri 51'; Safawi Rasid 88'			Stadium: Tan Sri Dato Haji Hassan Yunos Stadium

=== Thailand Pre-season Tour 2019 ===
Win Draw Loss

17 January 2019 Friendly	Ratchaburi Mitr Phol (Thailand)	2–1	(Malaysia) Johor Darul Ta'zim	Bangkok, Thailand
17:00 UTC+7	Yossak Chaowana 53'; Pathomchai Sueisakul 68'		Hazwan Bakri 80'	Stadium: KMITL Stadium

20 January 2019 Friendly	Bangkok United (Thailand)	2–2	(Malaysia) Johor Darul Ta'zim	Pathum Thani, Thailand
18:00 UTC+7	Mike Havenaar 53'; Teeratep Winothai 85'		Syafiq Ahmad 11'; Aarón Ñíguez 36'	Stadium: Thammasat Stadium

23 January 2019 Friendly	PTT Rayong (Thailand)	1–3	(Malaysia) Johor Darul Ta'zim	Bangkok, Thailand
17:00 UTC+7	Apiwat Pengprakon 12'		Gonzalo Cabrera 47'; Safawi Rasid 57'; Syafiq Ahmad 70'	Stadium: KMITL Stadium

== Competitions ==
=== Overview ===
Competition	First match	Last match	Starting round	Final position	Record							
Competition	First match	Last match	Starting round	Final position	Pld	W	D	L	GF	GA	GD	Win %
Malaysia Super League (Note: Includes the Charity Shield.)	2 February 2019	19 July 2019	Matchday 1	Winners	22	16	5	1	49	19	+30	72.73
Malaysia FA Cup	17 April 2019		Third round	Third round	1	0	0	1	0	1	−1	0.00
Malaysia Cup	2 August 2019	2 November 2019	Group stage	Winners	11	10	1	0	32	10	+22	90.91
AFC Champions League	5 March 2019	22 May 2019	Group stage	Group stage	6	1	1	4	4	8	−4	16.67
Total					40	27	7	6	85	38	+47	67.50

Last updated: 2 November 2019
Source: Competitions

=== Malaysia Super League ===
==== Table ====
Pos	Team	Pld	W	D	L	GF	GA	GD	Pts	Qualification or relegation
1	Johor Darul Ta'zim (C)	22	16	5	1	49	19	+30	53	Qualification for AFC Champions League group stage
2	Pahang	22	12	7	3	37	21	+16	43	
3	Selangor	22	10	7	5	41	35	+6	37	
4	Kedah (Note: Kedah FA qualified for the AFC Champions League preliminary round 2 as Malaysia FA Cup winners.)	22	9	7	6	37	29	+8	34	Qualification for AFC Champions League preliminary round 2
5	Perak	22	8	9	5	36	31	+5	33	

Source: MFL
Rules for classification: 1) Points; 2) Goal difference; 3) Number of goals scored.
(C) Champions

==== Results summary ====
Overall								Home						Away					
Pld	W	D	L	GF	GA	GD	Pts	W	D	L	GF	GA	GD	W	D	L	GF	GA	GD
22	16	5	1	49	19	+30	53	9	1	1	26	10	+16	7	4	0	23	9	+14

Source: Super League fixtures and results

==== Malaysia Super League fixtures and results ====
Win Draw Loss

2 February 2019 Charity Shield / 1	Johor Darul Ta'zim	1–0	Perak	Johor Bahru, Johor
21:00 UTC+8	Natxo Insa (substituted off) 36'; Mohd Afiq Fazail (substituted on) 36'; Gonzalo Cabrera 40' (substituted off) 90+2'; Mohd Azrif Nasrulhaq (yellow card) 68'; Syafiq Ahmad (substituted off) 79'; Diogo Luís Santo (substituted on) 79'; Akhyar Rashid (substituted on) 90+2'		Kenny Pallraj (substituted off) 42'; J. Partiban (substituted on) 42' (yellow card) 62'; Shahrul Saad (yellow card) 56'; Firdaus Saiyadi (substituted off) 66'; Shahrel Fikri (substituted on) 66'; Nor Hakim (substituted off) 78'; Khairil Anuar (substituted on) 78'; Amirul Azhan (yellow card) 82'; Brendan Gan (yellow card) 87'	Stadium: Larkin Stadium; Attendance: 22,510; Referee: Zulkarnain Zakaria

8 February 2019 2	Johor Darul Ta'zim	4–1	Kuala Lumpur	Johor Bahru, Johor
21:00 UTC+8	Hariss Harun (yellow card) 30'; Gonzalo Cabrera (penalty scored) 45+3' (substituted off) 88'; Syafiq Ahmad 52' (substituted off) 74'; Aarón Ñíguez (substituted off) 54'; Diogo Luís Santo (substituted on) 54' (goal) 59'; Akhyar Rashid (substituted on) 74'; Syamer Kutty Abba (substituted on) 88'; Mohd Azrif Nasrulhaq 89'		Zhafri Yahya (yellow card) 42'; Zaiful Abdul Hakim (yellow card) 45+3' (substituted off) 57'; Firdaus Faudzi (substituted on) 57'; Ashri Chuchu (substituted off) 65'; Arif Anwar (substituted on) 65'; Indra Putra Mahayuddin (substituted off) 71'; Syafwan Syahlan (substituted on) 71'; Sylvano Comvalius 77'	Stadium: Larkin Stadium; Attendance: 15,970; Referee: Wan Mohamad Tarmizi Wan Ibrahim

15 February 2019 3	Terengganu	2–2	Johor Darul Ta'zim	Kuala Terengganu, Terengganu
21:00 UTC+8	Khairul Izuan Rosli 7' (substituted off) 64'; Syamim Yahya (substituted off) 58'; Malik Ariff (substituted on) 58'; Kamal Azizi (yellow card) 60' (goal) 89'; Khairul Anwar Shahrudin (substituted on) 64'; Adib Aizuddin (yellow card) 74'; Kipré Tchétché (yellow card) 78'; Thierry Bin (substituted off) 85'; Ashari Samsudin (substituted on) 85'		Diogo Luís Santo (penalty missed) 32' 68'; Syamer Kutty Abba (yellow card) 38' (substituted off) 65'; Syafiq Ahmad (substituted off) 50'; Aarón Ñíguez (substituted on) 50'; Safawi Rasid (penalty scored) 62'; Mohd Afiq Fazail (substituted on) 65'; Gonzalo Cabrera (substituted off) 90+2'; Akhyar Rashid (substituted on) 90+2'	Stadium: Sultan Ismail Nasiruddin Shah Stadium; Attendance: 10,000; Referee: Nazmi Nasaruddin

23 February 2019 4	Johor Darul Ta'zim	2–1	(Malacca) Melaka United	Johor Bahru, Johor
21:00 UTC+8	Gonzalo Cabrera (penalty scored) 35'; Safawi Rasid 42' (substituted off) 89'; Hariss Harun (yellow card) 68'; Leandro Velazquez (substituted off) 77'; Akhyar Rashid (substituted on) 77'; Nazmi Faiz (substituted on) 89'; Mohd Afiq Fazail (substituted off) 90+3'; Syamer Kutty Abba (substituted on) 90+3'		Casagrande da Silva (substituted off) 17'; S. Deevan Raj (substituted on) 17'; R. Gopinathan (substituted off) 46'; Khuzaimi Piee (substituted on) 46'; Liridon Krasniqi (substituted off) 70'; Saiful Ridzuwan (substituted on) 70'; Patrick Reichelt 74'	Stadium: Larkin Stadium; Attendance: 19,210; Referee: Razlan Joffri Ali

1 March 2019 5	Selangor	2–4	Johor Darul Ta'zim	Shah Alam, Selangor
21:00 UTC+8	Michal Nguyễn (yellow card) 12'; Endrick dos Santos 33'; Rufino Segovia 45+3'; Abdul Halim Saari (substituted off) 71'; Latiff Suhaimi (substituted on) 71'; Syazwan Zainon (substituted off) 72'; Sean Selvaraj (substituted on) 72'; Nurridzuan Abu Hassan (substituted off) 80'; Fandi Othman (substituted on) 80'		Maurício dos Santos (yellow card) 5' (substituted off) 74'; Leandro Velazquez 7' 68'; Diogo Luís Santo 14'; Gonzalo Cabrera 42' (yellow card) 58' (substituted off) 90'; Adam Nor Azlin (substituted on) 74' (yellow card) 74'; Mohd Azrif Nasrulhaq (substituted off) 77'; S. Kunanlan (substituted on) 77'; Akhyar Rashid (substituted on) 90'	Stadium: Shah Alam Stadium; Attendance: 31,062; Referee: Mohd Zohri Tajuddin

9 March 2019 6	Johor Darul Ta'zim	3–0	(Perak) PKNP	Johor Bahru, Johor
21:00 UTC+8	Leandro Velazquez 27'; Diogo Luís Santo (penalty scored) 36'; Gonzalo Cabrera (penalty scored) 41' (substituted off) 77'; Hariss Harun (substituted off) 70'; Mohd Afiq Fazail (substituted on) 70'; Safawi Rasid (substituted on) 77'; La'Vere Corbin-Ong (substituted off) 84'; Syazwan Andik (substituted on) 84'		Fadhil Idris (yellow card) 20'; Amani Aguinaldo (yellow card) 36'; Siyovush Asrorov (substituted off) 40'; Alif Safwan Sallahuddin (substituted on) 40'; Rafiq Faeez Fuad (substituted off) 54'; Farid Nezal (substituted on) 54'; Ibni Khozaimi (substituted off) 71'; Khairul Asyraf Sahizah (substituted on) 71'; Sukri Hamid (red card) 74'	Stadium: Larkin Stadium; Attendance: 9,870; Referee: Khirulazuan Kidam

29 March 2019 7	Kedah	1–1	Johor Darul Ta'zim	Alor Setar, Kedah
21:00 UTC+8	Amirul Hisyam Awang Kechik (yellow card) 10'; Rizal Ghazali (yellow card) 15'; Fernando Rodriguez 31'; Azmeer Yusof (yellow card) 54'; Farhan Roslan (substituted off) 77'; Zaquan Adha (substituted on) 77'; Anmar Almubaraki (substituted off) 83'; N. Thanabalan (substituted on) 83'; Fernando Rodríguez (substituted off) 90+1'; Hidhir Idris (substituted on) 90+1'		Safawi Rasid 10' (substituted off) 84'; La'Vere Corbin-Ong (yellow card) 29'; Mohd Farizal Marlias (yellow card) 58'; Mohd Azrif Nasrulhaq (substituted off) 83'; Aidil Zafuan (substituted on) 83'; Akhyar Rashid (substituted on) 84'; Natxo Insa (substituted off) 90+1'; Mohd Afiq Fazail (substituted on) 90+1'	Stadium: Darulaman Stadium; Attendance: 25,000; Referee: Mohd Fairuzi Mat Desa

5 April 2019 8	Johor Darul Ta'zim	3–1	(Kuala Lumpur) Felda United	Johor Bahru, Johor
21:00 UTC+8	Leandro Velázquez (substituted off) 60'; Nazmi Faiz (substituted on) 60'; Natxo Insa (substituted off) 65'; Mohd Afiq Fazail (substituted on) 65'; Adam Nor Azlin (yellow card) 70'; Safawi Rasid (substituted off) 74'; Akhyar Rashid (substituted on) 74' (goal) 90+3'; Gonzalo Cabrera 88'; Diogo Luís Santo 90+9'		Zahril Azri (yellow card) 30' (yellow-red card) 61'; Hadin Azman (yellow card) 40' (yellow-red card) 90'; Thiago Junio (yellow card) 54' (yellow-red card) 85'; Jasazrin Jamaluddin (yellow card) 65'; Jocinei Schad 90+1'; Kei Ikeda (substituted off) 90+8'; Faiz Mazlan (substituted on) 90+8'	Stadium: Larkin Stadium; Attendance: 12,130; Referee: Fitri Maskon

13 April 2019 9	Petaling Jaya City (Selangor)	0–1	Johor Darul Ta'zim	Petaling Jaya, Selangor
21:00 UTC+8	Tinagaran Baskeran (yellow card) 49'; Thivandran Karnan (substituted off) 60'; Joshua Grommen (substituted on) 60' (yellow card) 64'; Mohd Aizulridzwan Razali (substituted off) 66'; Zamri Pin Ramli (substituted on) 66'; Annas Rahmat (substituted off) 82'; Satish Krishnan (substituted on) 82'		Mohd Afiq Fazail (yellow card) 21'; Syafiq Ahmad 26' (substituted off) 63'; Maurício dos Santos (yellow card) 60' (substituted off) 80'; Akhyar Rashid (substituted on) 63'; Adam Nor Azlin (substituted on) 80'; Hariss Harun (yellow card) 82'; Gonzalo Cabrera (substituted off) 86'; Nazmi Faiz (substituted on) 86'	Stadium: Petaling Jaya Stadium; Referee: Razlan Joffri Ali

20 April 2019 10	Johor Darul Ta'zim	3–1	(Selangor) PKNS	Johor Bahru, Johor
21:00 UTC+8	Mohd Afiq Fazail 8' (yellow card) 90'; Gonzalo Cabrera (penalty scored) 13'; Syamer Kutty Abba (yellow card) 28' (substituted off) 67'; Maurício dos Santos (substituted off) 46'; Aidil Zafuan (substituted on) 46'; Nazmi Faiz (substituted on) 67'; Leandro Velazquez (substituted off) 74'; Akhyar Rashid (substituted on) 74'; Safawi Rasid 84'		Rodney Celvin (yellow card) 33'; Gabriel Guerra (yellow card) 45+1' (goal) 48'; Qayyum Marjoni (substituted off) 46'; Nik Shahrul Azim (substituted on) 46' (yellow card) 53'; Nicholas Swirad (substituted off) 74'; K. Kannan (substituted on) 74'; Faizat Ghazli (substituted off) 77'; Alif Haikal Sabri (substituted on) 77'	Stadium: Larkin Stadium; Attendance: 6,880; Referee: Nazmi Nasaruddin

28 April 2019 11	Pahang	1–1	Johor Darul Ta'zim	Kuantan, Pahang
21:00 UTC+8	Herold Goulon 36' (yellow card) 79'; Faisal Rosli (yellow card) 57'; Dickson Nwakaeme (substituted off) 60'; Faisal Halim (substituted on) 60'; Salomon Raj (yellow card) 69'; Wan Zaharulnizam Zakaria (substituted off) 69'; Norshahrul Idlan Talaha (substituted on) 69'; Saddil Ramdani (substituted off) 72'; Zuhair Aizat (substituted on) 72'		Gonzalo Cabrera 5'; S. Kunanlan (yellow card) 28'; Maurício dos Santos (yellow card) 40' (yellow-red card) 45+3'; Leandro Velazquez (substituted off) 46'; Adam Nor Azlin (substituted on) 46'; Mohd Afiq Fazail (substituted off) 69'; Syamer Kutty Abba (substituted on) 69'; Diogo Luís Santo (substituted off) 81'; Syafiq Ahmad (substituted on) 81'	Stadium: Darulmakmur Stadium; Attendance: 19,134; Referee: Mohd Zohri Tajuddin

4 May 2019 12	Felda United (Kuala Lumpur)	0–2	Johor Darul Ta'zim	Jengka, Pahang
21:00 UTC+8	Faiz Mazlan (substituted off) 34'; Jasazrin Jamaluddin (substituted on) 34'; Thiago Junio (yellow card) 37'; Sadam Hashim (substituted off) 65'; Zahril Azri Zabri (substituted on) 65'; S. Chanturu (yellow card) 71' (substituted off) 85'; Kei Ikeda (yellow card) 75'; Haziq Puad (yellow card) 81'; Syahmi Zamri (substituted on) 85'; Jocinei Schad (yellow card) 90+3'		Leandro Velazquez (yellow card) 8' (substituted off) 89'; Diogo Luís Santo (yellow card) 28' (penalty scored) 38' 62' (substituted off) 86'; Safawi Rasid (yellow card) 74'; La'Vere Corbin-Ong (yellow card) 75'; Mohd Afiq Fazail (substituted off) 79'; Syafiq Ahmad (substituted on) 86'; Syamer Kutty Abba (substituted on) 79' (yellow card) 87'; Nazmi Faiz (substituted on) 89'	Stadium: Tun Abdul Razak Stadium; Referee: Wan Mohamad Tarmizi Bin Wan Ibrahim

12 May 2019 13	Johor Darul Ta'zim	2–0	Pahang	Johor Bahru, Johor
22:00 UTC+8	La'Vere Corbin-Ong (yellow card) 65'; Hariss Harun 69'; Leandro Velazquez (substituted off) 65'; Akhyar Rashid (substituted on) 65' (goal) 90+3'; Aidil Zafuan (substituted off) 81'; Adam Nor Azlin (substituted on) 81'; Gonzalo Cabrera (substituted off) 90+4'; Hasbullah Abu Bakar (substituted on) 90+4'		Safuwan Baharudin (yellow card) 8'; Faisal Rosli (yellow card) 13'; Muslim Ahmad (yellow card) 30' (substituted off) 85'; Azam Azih (yellow card) 41'; Faisal Halim (substituted off) 65'; Saddil Ramdani (substituted on) 65'; Zé Love (substituted off) 83'; Wan Zaharulnizam (substituted on) 83'; Bunyamin Umar (substituted on) 85'	Stadium: Larkin Stadium; Attendance: 8,210; Referee: Zulkarnain Zakaria

17 May 2019 14	PKNS (Selangor)	1–2	Johor Darul Ta'zim	Shah Alam, Selangor
22:00 UTC+8	K. Gurusamy (yellow card) 27' (substituted off) 89'; Romel Morales 30'; Akram Mahinan (yellow card) 45'; Tamirlan Kozubaev (yellow card) 62'; Mahali Jasuli (substituted off) 71'; Nicholas Swirad (substituted on) 71'; R. Surendran (substituted off) 73'; Faizat Ghazli (substituted on) 73'; K. Kannan (yellow card) 88'; Chan Vathanaka (substituted on) 89'		Safawi Rasid 18'; Leandro Velazquez (yellow card) 34' (substituted off) 90+1'; Diogo Luís Santo 60'; Gonzalo Cabrera (yellow card) 73' (substituted off) 84'; Mohd Afiq Fazail (substituted off) 78'; Syamer Kutty Abba (substituted on) 78'; Akhyar Rashid (substituted on) 84'; Syafiq Ahmad (substituted on) 90+1'	Stadium: Shah Alam Stadium; Referee: Mohd Fairuzi Mat Desa

26 May 2019 15	Johor Darul Ta'zim	2–0	Kedah	Johor Bahru, Johor
22:00 UTC+8	Leandro Velazquez 33' (substituted off) 90+3'; Mohd Afiq Fazail (substituted off) 85'; Nazmi Faiz (substituted on) 85'; Safawi Rasid 87' (yellow card) 87' (substituted off) 90+1'; Akhyar Rashid (substituted on) 90+1'; Syafiq Ahmad (substituted on) 90+3'		Jonatan Bauman (yellow card) 1'; Rizal Ghazali (yellow card) 39' (yellow-red card) 67'; Renan Alves (yellow card) 46'; Azmeer Yusof (yellow card) 51'; Zaquan Adha (yellow card) 55' (substituted off) 70'; Farhan Roslan (substituted off) 59'; Azamuddin Akil (substituted on) 59'; David Rowley (substituted off) 63'; Fayadh Zulkifli Amin (substituted on) 63'; Norfiqrie Talib (substituted on) 70'	Stadium: Larkin Stadium; Attendance: 10,410; Referee: Nazmi Nasaruddin

14 June 2019 16	PKNP (Perak)	1–1	Johor Darul Ta'zim	Ipoh, Perak
21:00 UTC+8	Ramón da Silva 14'; Sukri Hamid (yellow card) 58'; Yashir Islame (yellow card) 79'; Khairul Thaqif (yellow card) 79'; Pedro Sandoval (yellow card) 82'; Al-Fateh Afandi (yellow card) 88'; Filemon Anyie (yellow card) 89'		Diogo Luís Santo 4'; Mohd Afiq Fazail (yellow card) 33' (yellow-red card) 77'; Gonzalo Cabrera (penalty missed) 55'; Hariss Harun (yellow card) 90'	Stadium: Manjung Municipal Council Stadium; Referee: Razlan Joffri Ali

19 June 2019 17	Johor Darul Ta'zim	3–2	Selangor	Johor Bahru, Johor
21:00 UTC+8	Gonzalo Cabrera 10'; Leandro Velazquez 12' (yellow card) 88' (substituted off) 90+2'; Safawi Rasid 61' (substituted off) 82'; Nazmi Faiz (substituted off) 65'; Syamer Kutty Abba (substituted on) 65'; Akhyar Rashid (substituted on) 82'; Ahmad Hazwan Bakri (substituted on) 90+2'		Taylor Regan (yellow card) 26'; Fandi Othman (yellow card) 34'; Khyril Muhymeen 41' (substituted off) 59'; Sean Selvaraj (substituted on) 59'; Faiz Nasir (substituted off) 67'; K. Sarkunan (red card) 76'; Nurridzuan Abu Hassan (substituted off) 80'; Latiff Suhaimi (substituted on) 80'; Sandro da Silva (substituted on) 67' (penalty scored) 89'; Ashmawi Yakin (yellow card) 90'	Stadium: Larkin Stadium; Referee: Mohd Fairuzi Mat Desa

26 June 2019 18	Melaka United (Malacca)	1–2	Johor Darul Ta'zim	Krubong, Melaka
21:00 UTC+8	Nazrin Nawi (substituted off) 75'; Ramzi Haziq (substituted on) 75'; Jang Suk-won (substituted off) 78'; Mohd Razman Roslan (substituted on) 78'; Davy Claude Angan (penalty missed) 84'; Shukor Adan 84'; Raimi Mohd Nor (yellow card) 89'; Faris Shah Rosli (substituted off) 89'; Saiful Ridzuwan Selamat (substituted on) 89'		Nazmi Faiz 7' (substituted off) 73'; Diogo Luís Santo 27'; Akhyar Rashid (substituted on) 73'; Aidil Zafuan (substituted off) 86'; Fadhli Shas (substituted on) 86'; Gonzalo Cabrera (yellow card) 90+2' (substituted off) 90+2'; Syamer Kutty Abba (substituted on) 90+2'	Stadium: Hang Jebat Stadium; Attendance: 12,894; Referee: Nazmi Nasaruddin

6 July 2019 19	Perak	0–3	Johor Darul Ta'zim	Ipoh, Perak
21:00 UTC+8	Raianderson Morais (substituted off) 65'; Shahrel Fikri (substituted on) 65'; Brendan Gan (yellow card) 77'; Hussein Eldor (substituted off) 80'; Amirul Azhan (substituted on) 80'; Rafiuddin Roddin (substituted off) 90'; Nazirul Naim (substituted on) 90'		Leandro Velazquez 38' 48'; Adam Nor Azlin (yellow card) 54' (substituted off) 76'; Fadhli Shas (substituted on) 76'; Mohd Azrif Nasrulhaq (substituted off) 84'; Hasbullah Abu Bakar (substituted on) 84'; Safawi Rasid (substituted off) 90'; Akhyar Rashid (substituted on) 90' (goal) 90+3'	Stadium: Perak Stadium; Referee: Suhaizi Shukri

13 July 2019 20	Kuala Lumpur	0–4	Johor Darul Ta'zim	Cheras, Kuala Lumpur
21:00 UTC+8	Alif Samsudin (yellow card) 44'; Darko Markovic (yellow card) 45+1' (substituted off) 84'; Fakri Saarani (substituted off) 69'; Noh Haeng-Seok (substituted on) 69'; Shafiq Shaharudin (substituted on) 84'		Maurício dos Santos (yellow card) 9'; Gonzalo Cabrera 15' (substituted off) 67'; Diogo Luís Santo 28' 70'; Nazmi Faiz 61'; Syazwan Andik (substituted off) 66'; Mohd Azrif Nasrulhaq (substituted on) 66'; Akhyar Rashid (substituted on) 67'; Aidil Zafuan (substituted off) 79'; Fadhli Shas (substituted on) 79'	Stadium: KLFA Stadium; Referee: Fairuzi Mat Desa

16 July 2019 21	Johor Darul Ta'zim	0–1	(Selangor) Petaling Jaya City	Johor Bahru, Johor
21:00 UTC+8	Fadhli Shas (yellow card) 37'; Leandro Velazquez (yellow card) 39'; Nazmi Faiz (substituted off) 68'; Ahmad Hazwan Bakri (substituted on) 68'; Safawi Rasid (substituted off) 75'; Akhyar Rashid (substituted on) 75'; Mohd Azrif Nasrulhaq (substituted off) 90+1'; Syazwan Andik (substituted on) 90+1'		R. Barathkumar (yellow card) 10' (substituted off) 59'; K. Thivandran (substituted on) 59'; Washington Brandão 64'; S. Subramaniam (substituted off) 81'; Nasriq Baharom (substituted on) 81'; Pedro Henrique (substituted off) 90+2'; S. Veenod (substituted on) 90+2'	Stadium: Larkin Stadium; Referee: Hamdan Awang

19 July 2019 22	Johor Darul Ta'zim	3–3	Terengganu	Johor Bahru, Johor
21:00 UTC+8				Stadium: Larkin Stadium

=== Malaysia FA Cup ===
17 April 2019 3rd round	Johor Darul Ta'zim	0–1	(Selangor) PKNS	Johor Bahru, Johor
21:00 UTC+8	Kiko Insa (red card) 12'; Syamer Kutty Abba (substituted off) 37'; Maurício dos Santos (substituted on) 37'; Ahmad Hazwan Bakri (substituted off) 65'; Safawi Rasid (substituted on) 65'; Nazmi Faiz (substituted off) 76'; Diogo Luís Santo (substituted on) 76'		Kpah Sherman 48'; Tommy Mawat Bada (substituted off) 59'; Gabriel Guerra (substituted on) 59'; Faizat Ghazli (substituted off) 75'; K. Kannan (substituted on) 75'; Romel Morales (yellow card) 77'; R. Surendran (substituted off) 80'; Mahali Jasuli (substituted on) 80'	Stadium: Larkin Stadium; Referee: Khirulazuan Kidam

=== Malaysia Cup ===
==== Group B ====
Pos	Team	Pld	W	D	L	GF	GA	GD	Pts	Qualification	JDT	PKNP	PJC	UiTM
1	Johor Darul Ta'zim	6	5	1	0	19	8	+11	16	Advance to knockout stage	—	5–0	4–2	3–1
2	PKNP	6	3	1	2	12	9	+3	10	Advance to knockout stage	2–2	—	3–0	4–0
3	Petaling Jaya City	6	3	0	3	9	11	−2	9		2–3	2–1	—	1–0
4	UiTM	6	0	0	6	2	14	−12	0		1–2	0–2	0–2	—

Source: FAM MFL

2 August 2019 Matchday 1	Johor Darul Ta'zim	3–1	(Selangor) UiTM FC	Johor Bahru, Malaysia
21:00 UTC+8	Diogo 16', 85'; Safawi 65' (pen.); Hariss (yellow card) 76'; Adam (yellow card) 90+1'		Afif Asyraf (yellow card) 22'; Zulkhairi (yellow card) 36'; Korać 90+2'	Stadium: Tan Sri Dato Haji Hassan Yunos Stadium; Attendance: 5,860; Referee: Suhaizi Shukri

7 August 2019 Matchday 2	Johor Darul Ta'zim	4–2	(Selangor) Petaling Jaya City	Johor Bahru, Malaysia
21:00 UTC+8	Safawi 6'; Diogo (yellow card) 10'; Diogo 47', 72'; Afiq (yellow card) 62'		Elizeu (yellow card) 5'; Aizulridzwan (yellow card) 23'; Serginho (yellow card) 34'; Annas (yellow card) 41'; Brandão 59'; Barathkumar 70'; Brandão (yellow card) 60'; Subramaniam (yellow card) 90+4'	Stadium: Tan Sri Dato Haji Hassan Yunos Stadium; Attendance: 6,318; Referee: Zulkarnain Zakaria

16 August 2019 Matchday 3	PKNP FC (Perak)	2-2	Johor Darul Ta'zim	Manjung, Malaysia
21:00 UTC+8	Yashir Pinto 34' (pen.); Giancarlo 79'		Cabrera 7', 13'	Stadium: MP Manjung Stadium

23 August 2019 Matchday 4	Johor Darul Ta'zim	5-0	(Perak) PKNP FC	Johor Bahru, Malaysia
21:00 UTC+8	Mauricio 13'; Cabrera 31'; Safawi 36' (pen.), 62'; Diogo 50' (pen.)			Stadium: Tan Sri Dato Haji Hassan Yunos Stadium

13 September 2019 Matchday 5	Petaling Jaya City (Selangor)	2-3	Johor Darul Ta'zim	Petaling Jaya, Malaysia
21:00 UTC+8	Bae 11'; Brandão 58'		Safawi 24'; Syafiq 36', 61'	Stadium: MBPJ Stadium; Man of the Match: Syafiq Ahmad

17 September 2019 Matchday 6	UiTM FC (Selangor)	1-2	Johor Darul Ta'zim	Shah Alam, Malaysia
21:00 UTC+8				Stadium: UiTM Shah Alam Stadium

==== Bracket ====
Quarter-finals
(Perak) PKNP	1	1	2
Kedah	2	4	6
(Malacca) Melaka	0	1	1
Pahang	3	3	6
Terengganu	0	1	1
Johor Darul Ta'zim	1	4	5
Perak	1	1	2
Selangor	0	3	3

Semi-finals
Kedah	3	5	8
Pahang	3	5	8
Johor Darul Ta'zim	2	3	5
Selangor	1	0	1

Final
Kedah	0
Johor Darul Ta'zim	3

21 September 2019 QF 1st leg	Terengganu	0–1	Johor Darul Ta'zim	Kuala Terengganu, Terengganu
21:00 UTC+8	Hafizal Alias (yellow card) 5'; Izuan (yellow card) 45+4'; Nasrullah (yellow card) 77'	Report	Diogo 22'; Leandro (yellow card) 45+2'; Hariss (yellow card) 58'; Safawi (yellow card) 76'; Diogo (yellow card) 86'	Stadium: Sultan Ismail Nasiruddin Shah Stadium, Kuala Terengganu; Referee: Wan Mohamad Tarmizi

28 September 2019 QF 2nd leg	Johor Darul Ta'zim	4–1 (JDT win 5–1 agg.)	Terengganu	Johor Bahru, Johor
21:00 UTC+8	Cabrera 16' (pen.), 39'; Safawi Rasid 22', 36'; Azrif (yellow card) 78'	Report	Hafizal Alias (yellow card) 11'; Lee 45'; Nasrullah (yellow card) 72'; Mohammad Faudzi (yellow card) 90+2'	Stadium: Tan Sri Dato' Haji Hassan Yunos Stadium, Larkin; Referee: Zulkarnain Zakaria

19 October 2019 SF 1st leg	Johor Darul Ta'zim	2–1	Selangor	Johor Bahru, Johor
21:00 UTC+8	Syafiq 15'; Leandro 49'	Report	Ifedayo 17'; Prabakaran (yellow card) 45+1'; Halim (yellow card) 60'	Stadium: Tan Sri Dato' Haji Hassan Yunos Stadium, Larkin; Attendance: 21,130; Referee: Fairuzi Mat Desa

26 October 2019 SF 2nd leg	Selangor	0–3 (JDT win 5–1 agg.)	Johor Darul Ta'zim	Shah Alam, Selangor
21:00 UTC+8	Taylor (yellow card) 39'; Halim (yellow card) 59'	Report	Safawi Rasid 24', 46', 51'; Kunanlan (yellow card) 39'	Stadium: Shah Alam Stadium, Shah Alam; Attendance: 75,182; Referee: Muhammad Nazmi Nasaruddin; Man of the Match: Safawi Rasid

2 November 2019 Final	Kedah	0-3	Johor Darul Ta'zim	Bukit Jalil, Kuala Lumpur
21:00 UTC+8			Leandro 27'; Safawi Rasid 35'; Syafiq 57'	Stadium: Bukit Jalil National Stadium, Bukit Jalil; Attendance: 85,420; Referee: Muhammad Nazmi Nasaruddin; Man of the Match: Safawi Rasid

=== AFC Champions League ===
==== Table ====
Pos	Team	Pld	W	D	L	GF	GA	GD	Pts	Qualification	SDL	KAS	GYE	JDT
1	(China) Shandong Luneng	6	3	2	1	10	8	+2	11	Advance to knockout stage	—	2–2	2–1	2–1
2	(Japan) Kashima Antlers	6	3	1	2	9	8	+1	10	Advance to knockout stage	2–1	—	0–1	2–1
3	(South Korea) Gyeongnam FC	6	2	2	2	9	8	+1	8		2–2	2–3	—	2–0
4	(Malaysia) Johor Darul Ta'zim	6	1	1	4	4	8	−4	4		0–1	1–0	1–1	—

Source: AFC

Win Draw Loss

==== Group stage ====
5 March 2019 Matchday 1	Kashima Antlers (Japan)	2–1	(Malaysia) Johor Darul Ta'zim	Kashima, Ibaraki
19:00 UTC+7	Sérgio Antônio (penalty missed) 13' 56' (substituted off) 79'; Yasushi Endo (yellow card) 41' (substituted off) 70'; Taiki Hirato 43'; Hiroki Abe (substituted on) 70' (yellow card) 76'; Kento Misao (substituted on) 79'; Shintaro Nago (substituted off) 87'; Shoma Doi (substituted on) 87'		Adam Nor Azlin (yellow card) 25'; Syafiq Ahmad (substituted off) 59'; Nazmi Faiz (substituted on) 59'; Diogo Luís Santo (yellow card) 51' (goal) 80'; Safawi Rasid (yellow card) 65' (substituted off) 79'; Akhyar Rashid (substituted on) 79'; Mohd Afiq Fazail (substituted off) 90'; Syamer Kutty Abba (substituted on) 90'	Stadium: Kashima Soccer Stadium; Attendance: 6,425; Referee: Turki Al-Khudhayr (Saudi Arabia)

12 March 2019 Matchday 2	Johor Darul Ta'zim (Malaysia)	1–1	(South Korea) Gyeongnam FC	Johor Bahru, Johor
20:30 UTC+8	S. Kunanlan (substituted off) 34'; Mohd Azrif Nasrulhaq (substituted on) 34'; Hariss Harun (yellow card) 57'; Diogo Luís Santo (penalty scored) 68'; Maurício dos Santos (yellow card) 74'; Adam Nor Azlin (yellow card) 86'; Mohd Afiq Fazail (substituted off) 88'; Natxo Insa (substituted on) 88'; Safawi Rasid (substituted off) 90+3'; Syafiq Ahmad (substituted on) 90+3'		Park Kwang-il (substituted off) 40'; Woo Joo-sung (substituted on) 40'; Lee Kwang-jin (yellow card) 44'; Kwak Tae-hwi 51'; Bae Ki-jong (substituted off) 60'; Park Gi-dong (substituted on) 60'; Luc Castaignos (substituted off) 71'; Ko Kyung-min (substituted on) 71'; Guilherme Negueba (yellow card) 90+2'	Stadium: Larkin Stadium; Attendance: 16,130; Referee: Mohanad Qassim (Iraq)

9 April 2019 Matchday 3	Shandong Luneng (China)	2–1	(Malaysia) Johor Darul Ta'zim	Jinan, Shandong
19:00 UTC+7	Marouane Fellaini 30'; Lin Dai (yellow card) 35'; Graziano Pelle (penalty scored) 39'; Liu Binbin (substituted off) 57'; Zhou Haibin (substituted on) 57'; Wu Xinghan (substituted off) 80'; Wang Tong (substituted on) 80'; Zhang Chi (substituted off) 88'; Cui Peng (substituted on) 88'; Zheng Zheng (yellow card) 90+4'		Aidil Zafuan (yellow card) 45'; Safawi Rasid 60' (substituted off) 87'; Nazmi Faiz (substituted off) 63'; Akhyar Rashid (substituted on) 63'; Syafiq Ahmad (substituted on) 87'	Stadium: Jinan Olympic Sports Center Stadium; Attendance: 11,062; Referee: Adham Makhadmeh (Jordan)

24 April 2019 Matchday 4	Johor Darul Ta'zim (Malaysia)	0–1	(China) Shandong Luneng	Johor Bahru, Johor
20:30 UTC+8	Diogo Luís Santo (yellow card) 30' (substituted off) 57'; Gonzalo Cabrera (substituted on) 57'; Akhyar Rashid (substituted off) 64'; Safawi Rasid (substituted on) 64'; Syafiq Ahmad (substituted off) 71'; Ahmad Hazwan Bakri (substituted on) 71'		Wang Tong (yellow card) 14'; Graziano Pelle 22'; Liu Yang (yellow card) 42'; Song Wenjie (substituted off) 60'; Wu Xinghan (substituted on) 60'; Zhang Chi (substituted off) 82'; Zhou Haibin (substituted on) 82'; Jin Jingdao (substituted off) 88'; Zheng Zheng (substituted on) 88'	Stadium: Larkin Stadium; Attendance: 13,960; Referee: Khamis Al-Marri (Qatar)

8 May 2019 Matchday 5	Johor Darul Ta'zim (Malaysia)	1–0	(Japan) Kashima Antlers	Johor Bahru, Johor
20:30 UTC+8	Aidil Zafuan (substituted off) 64'; Adam Nor Azlin (substituted on) 64'; Syafiq Ahmad 69' (substituted off) 80'; Ahmad Hazwan Bakri (substituted on) 80' (yellow card) 87'; Safawi Rasid (yellow card) 90+3' (substituted off) 90+3'; Syamer Kutty Abba (substituted on) 90+3'; Gonzalo Cabrera (yellow card) 90+5'		Taiki Hirato (substituted off) 71'; Shoma Doi (substituted on) 71'; Yasushi Endo (substituted off) 75'; Takeshi Kanamori (substituted on) 75'; Hiroki Abe (substituted off) 83'; Kazuma Yamaguchi (substituted on) 83'; Koki Anzai (yellow card) 87'	Stadium: Larkin Stadium; Attendance: 4,860; Referee: Mohanad Qassim (Iraq)

22 May 2019 Matchday 6	Gyeongnam FC (South Korea)	2–0	(Malaysia) Johor Darul Ta'zim	Changwon, Gyeongsangnam-do
19:00 UTC+7	Lee Yeong-jae (substituted off) 55'; Bae Ki-jong (substituted on) 55'; Luc Castaignos 65' (yellow card) 73' (substituted off) 77'; Ha Sung-min (yellow card) 66'; Ko Kyung-min (substituted on) 77'; Takahiro Kunimoto 90+4'		Syafiq Ahmad (yellow card) 47' (substituted off) 83'; Maurício dos Santos (yellow card) 48' (substituted off) 51'; Adam Nor Azlin (substituted on) 51'; Mohd Afiq Fazail (yellow card) 54'; Akhyar Rashid (substituted off) 71'; Nazmi Faiz (substituted on) 71'; Ahmad Hazwan Bakri (substituted on) 83'	Stadium: Changwon Football Center; Attendance: 1,514; Referee: Alireza Faghani (Iran)

== Club statistics ==
=== Appearances ===
Correct as of match played on 13 July 2019

No.	Pos.	Name	League	FA Cup	Malaysia Cup	Asia^{1}	Total
1	GK	(Malaysia) Farizal Marlias	18	0	0	3	21
3	DF	(Malaysia) Adam Nor Azlin	13+4	0	3+2	2+2	18+8
4	DMF	(Malaysia) Afiq Fazail	14+5	0	0	5	19+5
5	MF	(Malaysia) (Spain) Natxo Insa	3	0	0	0+1	3+1
6	LB	(Malaysia) Syazwan Andik	1+1	1	0	0	2+1
7	DF	(Malaysia) Aidil Zafuan	11+2	0	8	4	23+2
8	FW	(Brazil) Diogo Luís Santo	18+2	0+1	0	5	23+3
9	FW	(Malaysia) Hazwan Bakri	0+1	1	0	0+3	1+4
10	FW	(Malaysia) Safawi Rasid	18+1	0+1	0	4+1	22+3
11	AMF	(Argentina) (Iraq) Gonzalo Cabrera	19	0	0	5+1	24+1
12	RB	(Malaysia) S. Kunanlan	12+1	0	0	5	17+1
13	DMF	(Malaysia) Gary Steven Robbat	0	0	0	0	0
14	MF	(Singapore) Hariss Harun	18	1	0	6	25
16	MF	(Malaysia) Syamer Kutty Abba	3+7	1	0	1+2	5+9
18	AMF	(Argentina) Leandro Velazquez	14	0	0	0	14
19	RW	(Malaysia) Akhyar Rashid	1+15	1	0	2+2	4+17
20	RB	(Malaysia) Azrif Nasrulhaq	9+2	1	0	1+1	11+3
21	MF	(Malaysia) Nazmi Faiz	5+7	1	0	4+2	10+9
22	LB	(Malaysia) (Canada) Corbin-Ong	18	0	0	6	24
23	DF	(Malaysia) (Spain) Kiko Insa	1	1	0	0	2
24	GK	(Malaysia) Izham Tarmizi	1	1	0	3	5
26	GK	(Malaysia) Haziq Nadzli	0	0	0	0	0
27	DF	(Malaysia) Fadhli Shas	0+3	1	1	1	2+3
28	FW	(Malaysia) Syafiq Ahmad	4+4	1	0	4+2	9+6
33	CB	(Brazil) Maurício Nascimento	17	0+1	0	5	22+1
35	DF	(Malaysia) Hasbullah Abu Bakar	0+2	0	0	0	0+2
Left club during season
2	DMF	(Malaysia) (Sweden) Junior Eldstål	0	0	0	0	0
17	LW	(Spain) Aarón Ñíguez	2+1	0	0	0	2+1
2	CB	(Malaysia) Dominic Tan	0	0	0	0	0

=== Top scorers ===
Rnk	No.	Pos.	Name	League	FA Cup	Malaysia Cup	Asia	Total
1	8	FW	(Brazil) Diogo Luís Santo	12	0	0	2	14
2	11	FW	(Syria) (Argentina) Gonzalo Cabrera	11	0	0	0	11
3	29	FW	(Malaysia) Safawi Rasid	8	0	11	1	20
4	18	AMF	(Argentina) Leandro Velazquez	8	0	0	0	8
5	19	FW	(Malaysia) Akhyar Rashid	3	0	0	0	3
5	28	FW	(Malaysia) Syafiq Ahmad	2	0	0	1	3
6	21	MF	(Malaysia) Nazmi Faiz	2	0	0	0	2
7	20	RB	(Malaysia) Mohd Azrif Nasrulhaq	1	0	0	0	1
7	14	MF	(Singapore) Hariss Harun	1	0	0	0	1
7	4	MF	(Malaysia) Mohd Afiq Fazail	1	0	0	0	1
Own goals				0	0	0	0	0
Total				49	0	0	4	53

=== Top assists ===
Rnk	No.	Pos.	Name	League	FA Cup	Malaysia Cup	Asia	Total
1	8	FW	(Brazil) Diogo Luís Santo	3	0	0	0	3
2	17	LW	(Spain) Aarón Ñíguez	2	0	0	0	2
3	10	FW	(Malaysia) Safawi Rasid	1	0	0	0	1
3	22	LB	(Malaysia) (Canada) Corbin Ong	1	0	0	0	1
3	11	FW	(Syria) (Argentina) Gonzalo Cabrera	1	0	0	0	1
3	19	AMF	(Argentina) Leandro Velazquez	1	0	0	0	1
3	14	MF	(Singapore) Hariss Harun	0	0	0	1	1
3	4	MF	(Malaysia) Mohd Afiq Fazail	0	0	0	1	1
Total				9	0	0	2	11

=== Discipline ===
Rnk	No.	Player	Total			League			FA Cup			Malaysia Cup			Asia		
Rnk	No.	Player	Yellow card	(yellow card) (red card)	Red card	Yellow card	(yellow card) (red card)	Red card	Yellow card	(yellow card) (red card)	Red card	Yellow card	(yellow card) (red card)	Red card	Yellow card	(yellow card) (red card)	Red card
1	14	(Singapore) Hariss Harun	4	0	0	3	0	0	0	0	0	0	0	0	1	0	0
1	3	(Malaysia) Adam Nor Azlin	4	0	0	2	0	0	0	0	0	0	0	0	2	0	0
2	33	(Brazil) Maurício dos Santos	3	1	0	2	1	0	0	0	0	0	0	0	1	0	0
3	16	(Malaysia) Syamer Kutty Abba	3	0	0	3	0	0	0	0	0	0	0	0	0	0	0
3	4	(Malaysia) Mohd Afiq Fazail	2	0	0	2	0	0	0	0	0	0	0	0	0	0	0
3	8	(Brazil) Diogo Luís Santo	3	0	0	1	0	0	0	0	0	0	0	0	2	0	0
4	23	(Malaysia) (Spain) Kiko Insa	0	0	1	0	0	0	0	0	1	0	0	0	0	0	0
5	20	(Malaysia) Azrif Nasrulhaq	1	0	0	1	0	0	0	0	0	0	0	0	0	0	0
5	11	(Syria) (Argentina) Gonzalo Cabrera	3	0	0	2	0	0	0	0	0	0	0	0	1	0	0
5	18	(Argentina) Leandro Velazquez	2	0	0	2	0	0	0	0	0	0	0	0	0	0	0
5	1	(Malaysia) Mohd Farizal Marlias	1	0	0	1	0	0	0	0	0	0	0	0	0	0	0
5	22	(Malaysia) (Canada) La'Vere Corbin-Ong	3	0	0	3	0	0	0	0	0	0	0	0	0	0	0
5	10	(Malaysia) Safawi Rasid	1	0	0	0	0	0	0	0	0	0	0	0	1	0	0
5	7	(Malaysia) Aidil Zafuan	1	0	0	0	0	0	0	0	0	0	0	0	1	0	0
5	12	(Malaysia) S. Kunanlan	1	0	0	0	0	0	0	0	0	0	0	0	1	0	0
Totals			24	1	1	15	1	0	0	0	1	0	0	0	9	0	0

== Transfers and contracts ==
=== In ===
No.	Pos.	Name	Age	Moving from	Type	Transfer Date	Transfer fee
33	DF	(Brazil) Maurício	38	(Italy) S.S. Lazio	Transfer	22 October 2018	Free
18	DF	(Malaysia) Mahali Jasuli	35	(Malaysia) PKNS F.C.	Loan Return	31 October 2018	NA
15	DF	(Malaysia) Fazly Mazlan	32	(Malaysia) Johor Darul Ta'zim II F.C.	Loan Return	31 October 2018	NA
21	MF	(Malaysia) Nazmi Faiz	32	(Malaysia) Johor Darul Ta'zim II F.C.	Loan Return	31 October 2018	NA
28	FW	(Malaysia) Syafiq Ahmad	31	(Malaysia) Johor Darul Ta'zim II F.C.	Loan Return	31 October 2018	NA
37	FW	(Malaysia) (England) Darren Lok	35	(Malaysia) Johor Darul Ta'zim II F.C.	Loan Return	31 October 2018	NA
25	DF	(Malaysia) (Sweden) Junior Eldstål	35	(Malaysia) Johor Darul Ta'zim II F.C.	Loan Return	31 October 2018	NA
	FW	(France) Harry Novillo	36	(Malaysia) Johor Darul Ta'zim II F.C.	Loan Return	31 October 2018	NA
	DF	(Malaysia) Chanturu Suppiah	38	(Malaysia) Melaka United	Loan Return	31 October 2018	NA
	MF	(Malaysia) Gopinathan Ramachandra	36	(Malaysia) Melaka United	Loan Return	31 October 2018	NA
17	MF	(Spain) Aarón Ñíguez	37	(Spain) Real Oviedo	Transfer	20 November 2018	Free
	FW	(Malaysia) Akhyar Rashid	27	(Malaysia) Kedah FA	Transfer	29 December 2018	Tribunal Fee (MYS 275,000)
	FW	(Brazil) Diogo	39	(Thailand) Buriram United F.C.	Transfer	31 December 2018	THB 5,000,000 (MYS 6,460,000)
	DF	(Malaysia) Syazwan Andik	30	(Malaysia) Kuala Lumpur FA	Transfer	12 January 2019	Free
	MF	(Argentina) Leandro Velázquez	37	(Colombia) Rionegro Águilas	Transfer	21 February 2019	Undisclosed

Note 1: Harry Novillo returned to the team after the loan and subsequently leave the club after his contract ended.

Note 2: R.Gopinathan returned to Melaka United after the loan and on free transfer.

Note 3: S. Chanturu joined Felda United after returning from loan.

Note 4: Mahali Jasuli rejoins PKNS FC for another loan arrangement.

Note 5: Junior Eldstål retires from football in 2019.

Note 6: Aarón Ñíguez was released before the 1st transfer window closed.

=== Out ===
No.	Pos.	Name	Age	Moving to	Type
5	FW	(Argentina) Fernando Elizari	35	(Chile) O'Higgins	Released
6	DF	(Brazil) Marcos António Elias Santos	43	Retired	Released
8	MF	(Malaysia) Safiq Rahim	39	(Malaysia) Melaka United	Free
	MF	(Malaysia) Gopinathan Ramachandra	36	(Malaysia) Melaka United	Free
18	FW	(Argentina) Fernando Andrés Márquez	38	(Argentina) Defensa y Justicia	Loan
	MF	(Malaysia) Amirul Hadi	40	(Malaysia) Johor Darul Ta'zim II	Transfer
	FW	(France) Harry Novillo	34	(Canada) Montreal Impact	Free
	MF	(Malaysia) Chanturu Suppiah	38	(Malaysia) Felda United	Free
18	DF	(Malaysia) Mahali Jasuli	35	(Malaysia) PKNS F.C.	Season Loan
25	MF	(Malaysia) Junior Eldstål	35	Retired	Free
	DF	(Malaysia) Fazly Mazlan	32	(Malaysia) Johor Darul Ta'zim II	Transfer
17	MF	(Spain) Aarón Ñíguez	37	(Malaysia) Johor Darul Ta'zim II	Transfer
2	DF	(Malaysia) Dominic Tan	29	(Thailand) Police Tero	Season loan

=== Retained ===
Position	Player	Ref
GK	(Malaysia) Haziq Nadzli	4 years contract signed in 2018
MF	(Malaysia) Syamer Kutty Abba	4 years contract signed in 2018
FW	(Malaysia) Safawi Rasid	4 years contract signed in 2018
GK	(Malaysia) Izham Tarmizi	3 years contract signed in 2018
DF	(Malaysia) Fazly Mazlan	3 years contract signed in 2018
DF	(Malaysia) Azrif Nasrulhaq	3 years contract signed in 2018
DF	(Malaysia) Fadhli Shas	3 years contract signed in 2018
MF	(Malaysia) Afiq Fazail	2 years contract signed in 2018
FW	(Malaysia) Hazwan Bakri	2 years contract signed in 2018
MF	(Malaysia) Gary Steven Robbat	2 years contract signed in 2018
DF	(Malaysia) Aidil Zafuan	1 year contract signed in 2018
DF	(Malaysia) S. Kunanlan	1 year contract signed in 2018
MF	(Singapore) Hariss Harun	3 year contract signed in 2018
DF	(Malaysia) Adam Nor Azlin	
DF	(Malaysia) Dominic Tan	
DF	(Malaysia) (Canada) La'Vere Corbin-Ong	
MF	(Malaysia) Nazmi Faiz	
