= Adam Nor Azlin =

Malaysian footballer

Personal information
- Full name: Adam Nor bin Azlin
- Date of birth: 5 January 1996 (age 30)
- Place of birth: Klang, Selangor, Malaysia
- Height: 2.00 m (6 ft 7 in)
- Position: Centre-back

Team information
- Current team: Kuala Lumpur City
- Number: 3

Youth career
- 2009–2013: Sekolah Sukan Bukit Jalil
- 2014–2015: Harimau Muda

Senior career*
Years	Team	Apps	(Gls)
2015	Harimau Muda B	24	(6)
2016–2017	Selangor	34	(3)
2018–2023	Johor Darul Ta'zim	43	(1)
2023	→ P.S.G (loan)	18	(12)
2024–2025	Sri Pahang	20	(3)
2025–	Kuala Lumpur City	1	(2)

International career^{‡}
2013–2017	Malaysia U21	15	(4)
2014–2019	Malaysia U23	40	(6)
2017–2019	Malaysia	15	(1)
Medal record
Representing Malaysia
Men's football
AFF Championship
Runner-up	2018
Malaysia under-23
Sea Games
Silver medal – second place	Sea Games 2017	Football
- * Club domestic league appearances and goals as of 22 September 2025 ‡ National team caps and goals as of 4 December 2019

Adam bin Nor Azlin (born 5 January 1996) is a Malaysian professional footballer who plays for Malaysia Super League club Kuala Lumpur City. He plays mainly as a defender.

== Club career ==
=== Youth ===
Adam was handpicked as a 16-year-old by former Harimau Muda coach Ong Kim Swee towards the end of 2012. He remained part of Ong's squad for the European stint in 2013 and the National Premier Leagues Queensland in 2014 before joining Harimau Muda B playing in the Singapore S.League in 2015.

=== Selangor ===
Following the disbanding of Harimau Muda project in late 2015, Adam signs for Selangor In January 2016 for two seasons.

=== Johor Darul Ta'zim ===
On 18 November 2017, Johor Darul Ta'zim announced the signing of Adam from Selangor. He make his debut for the club in a league match against Perak on 6 February 2018.

On 2 April 2021, Adam scored his first goal for the club in a league match against Melaka United.

On 28 December 2023, the club announced that he will leave the club at the end of the 2023 season.

=== Sri Pahang ===
On 21 February 2024, Adam joined Sri Pahang on a free transfer.

== International career ==
=== Youth ===
Adam represented Malaysia U-23 in the 2015 Bangabandhu Cup, 2015 Southeast Asian Games and the 2017 Southeast Asian Games.

=== Senior ===
On 13 November 2017, Adam made his debut for Malaysia national team as a starter in a 1–4 defeat to North Korea of the 2019 AFC Asian Cup qualification that was held in New I-Mobile Stadium.

== Personal life ==
In 2018, he married Nur Azlin Md Mazlan.

== Career statistics ==
=== Club ===
As of match played 1 August 2022

Appearances and goals by club, season and competition
Club	Season	League			Cup		League Cup		Continental		Total	
Club	Season	Division	Apps	Goals	Apps	Goals	Apps	Goals	Apps	Goals	Apps	Goals
Harimau Muda	2015	S.League	24	1	0	0	0	0	0	0	24	1
Selangor	2016	Malaysia Super League	17	2	2	0	10	1	5	0	34	3
Selangor	2017	Malaysia Super League	17	1	1	0	6	0	–		24	1
Selangor	Total		34	3	3	0	16	1	5	0	58	4
Johor Darul Ta'zim	2018	Malaysia Super League	5	0	0	0	0	0	3	0	8	0
Johor Darul Ta'zim	2019	Malaysia Super League	17	0	0	0	5	0	4	0	26	0
Johor Darul Ta'zim	2020	Malaysia Super League	4	0	0	0	0	0	1	0	5	0
Johor Darul Ta'zim	2021	Malaysia Super League	15	1	0	0	0	0	2	0	17	1
Johor Darul Ta'zim	2022	Malaysia Super League	2	0	2	0	1	0	1	0	6	0
Johor Darul Ta'zim	Total		43	1	0	0	5	0	10	0	58	1
Johor Darul Ta'zim II (loan)	2018	Malaysia Premier League	2	0	0	0	0	0	–		2	0
Johor Darul Ta'zim II (loan)	Total		0	0	0	0	0	0	0	0	0	0
Sri Pahang	2024–25	Malaysia Super League	20	3	1	0	7	0	–		28	3
Sri Pahang	Total		20	3	1	0	7	0	–		28	3
Kuala Lumpur City	2025–26	Malaysia Super League	0	0	0	0	0	0	0	0	0	0
Kuala Lumpur City	Total		0	0	0	0	0	0	0	0	0	0
Career Total			103	5	3	0	21	1	15	0	140	4

=== International ===
As of 9 November 2019

Appearances and goals by national team and year
National team	Year	Apps	Goals
Malaysia	2017	1	0
Malaysia	2018	6	1
Malaysia	2019	8	0
Total		15	1

=== International goals ===
Scores and results list Malaysia's goal tally first.

#	Date	Venue	Opponent	Score	Result	Competition
1.	12 October 2018	Sugathadasa Stadium, Colombo, Sri Lanka	Sri Lanka	2–1	4–1	Friendly

== Honours ==
=== Club ===
Johor Darul Ta'zim

- Malaysia Super League: 2018, 2019, 2020, 2021, 2022, 2023
- Malaysia Cup: 2019, 2022, 2023
- Malaysia Charity Shield: 2020, 2021, 2022, 2023
- Malaysia FA Cup: 2016, 2022, 2023

=== International ===
Malaysia U-23

- Bangabandhu Cup: 2015
- SEA Games : (silver) Silver 2017

=== Individual ===
- Malaysia Football League Most Promising Player: 2017
