= Afiq Fazail =

Malaysian footballer

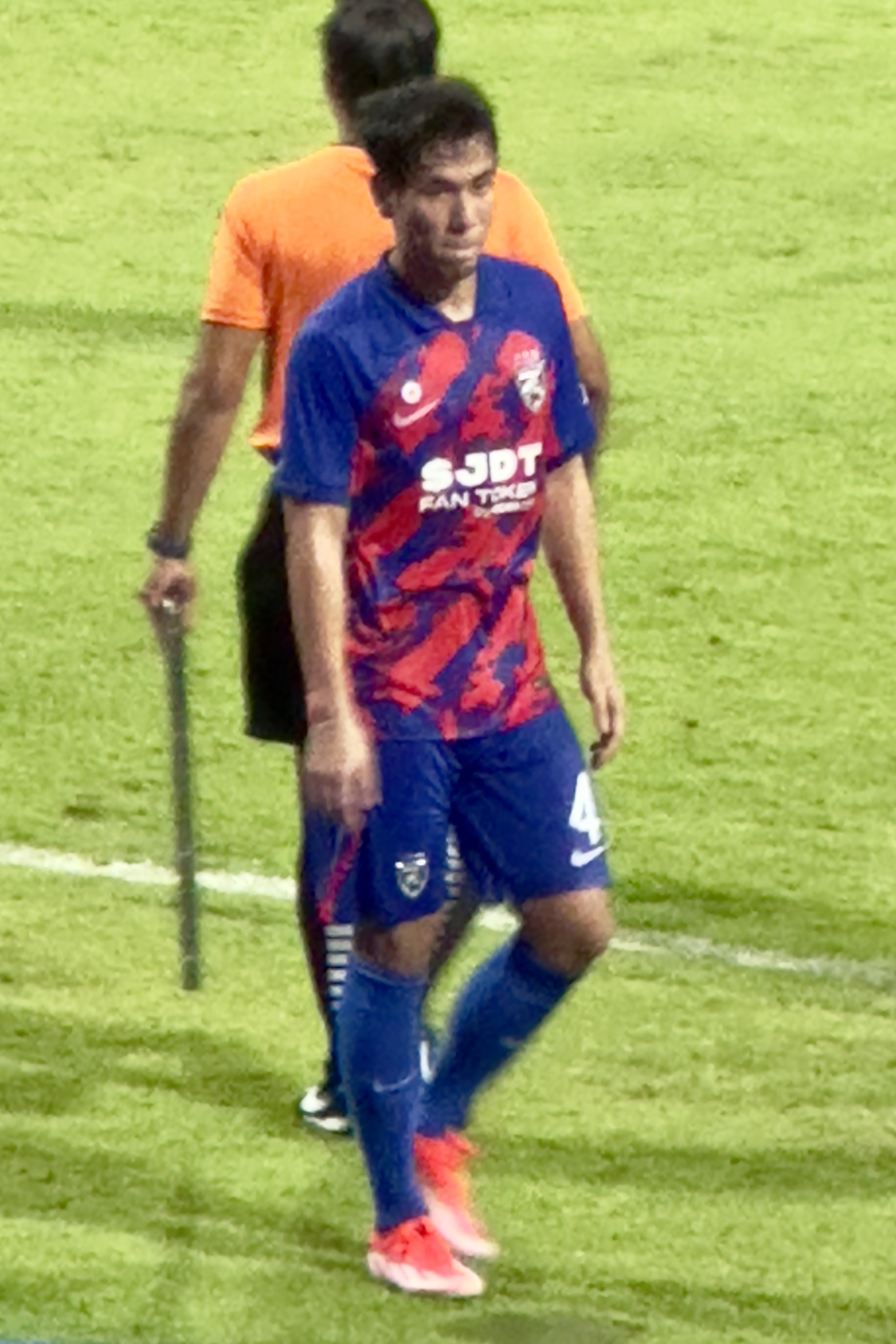
- Afiq with Johor Darul Ta'zim in 2024

Personal information
- Full name: Muhammad Afiq bin Fazail
- Date of birth: 29 September 1994 (age 32)
- Place of birth: Pontian, Johor, Malaysia
- Height: 1.71 m (5 ft 7 in)
- Position: Defensive midfielder

Team information
- Current team: Johor Darul Ta'zim
- Number: 4

Youth career
- 2012–2013: Johor U19

Senior career*
Years	Team	Apps	(Gls)
2014	Harimau Muda B	21	(0)
2015–2016	Johor Darul Ta'zim II	30	(1)
2017–	Johor Darul Ta'zim	134	(5)

International career^{‡}
2014	Malaysia U21	1	(0)
2017–	Malaysia	8	(0)
Medal record
Men's football
Representing Malaysia
Merdeka Tournament
Winner	2024
- * Club domestic league appearances and goals as of 17 January 2026 ‡ National team caps and goals as of 9 October 2025

Muhammad Afiq bin Fazail (born 29 September 1994) is a Malaysian professional footballer who plays as a defensive midfielder for Malaysia Super League club Johor Darul Ta'zim and the Malaysia national team.

Afiq has individually won 2 FAM Football Awards 'Best Midfielder Award' in 2022 and 2023 where he was also included in the 'Team of the Season'. In the 2025–2026 season, he was named the Most Valuable Player (MVP) of the Malaysian Super League. The Johor Darul Ta'zim (JDT) midfielder won the prestigious award for the first time in his career during the newly rebranded Liga M Awards held in August 2026, breaking the historic streak of his teammate, Arif Aiman Hanapi, who had previously won the MVP award four consecutive times. Afiq was recognized after a stellar season anchoring JDT's midfield, helping the club secure a quadruple of trophies. He also won the Best Midfielder award at the same ceremony.

== Club career ==
=== Harimau Muda B ===
In January 2014, Afiq played for Harimau Muda B which took part in the Singapore 2014 S. League. He make his debut for the club on 24 February 2024 in a league match against Tanjong Pagar United. He racked up 22 appearances and getting two assists in all competition throughout the season.

=== Johor Darul Ta'zim ===
Afiq return to Johor in 2015 where he signed with Johor Darul Ta'zim and played his debut season with the Johor Darul Ta'zim II team in the Malaysia Premier League appearing in 12 league matches.

In November 2016, Afiq was promoted to Johor Darul Ta'zim main team after spending 2 seasons for the feeder team. He make his debut on 21 January 2017 in a league match against Felda United where he came off the bench in the last 10th minute of the game.

On 20 April 2019, Afiq scored his first goal for the club against PKNS in a 3–1 league win.

On 26 April 2025, During the match against Sri Pahang in the 2025 Malaysia Cup Final, Afiq becomes the first player to play in sixth Malaysia Cup final.

== International career ==
Afiq played for Malaysia U21 in 2014. He started in a friendly match against Indonesia U23 in a match which Malaysia U21 lost 3–0.

Afiq made his debut with the Malaysia senior team on 10 November 2017 against North Korea in a 2019 AFC Asian Cup qualification match.

On 21 November 2023, Afiq make his fifth cap after four years in the 2026 FIFA World Cup qualification match against Chinese Taipei.

Afiq was included in the nation 2023 AFC Asian Cup squad held in Qatar. On 15 January 2024, he make his first tournament start against Jordan.

== Personal life ==
Afiq is the younger brother of Malaysian international Irfan Fazail who is also a professional footballer playing for another Malaysia Super League club, Sabah.

== Career statistics ==
=== Club ===
As of 12 December 2023

Appearances and goals by club, season and competition
Club	Season	League			National cup (Note: Including Singapore Cup)		League cup		Continental (Note: Including AFC Cup and AFC Champions League)		Total	
Club	Season	Division	Apps	Goals	Apps	Goals	Apps	Goals	Apps	Goals	Apps	Goals
Harimau Muda B	2014	S.League	21	0	1	0	0	0	−		22	0
Harimau Muda B	Total		21	0	1	0	0	0	−		22	0
Johor Darul Ta'zim II	2015	Malaysia Premier League	12	0	0	0	4	0	−		16	0
Johor Darul Ta'zim II	2016	Malaysia Premier League	18	1	1	0	3	0	−		22	1
Johor Darul Ta'zim II	Total		30	1	1	0	7	0	−		38	1
Johor Darul Ta'zim	2017	Malaysia Super League	17	0	4	0	8	0	4	0	33	0
Johor Darul Ta'zim	2018	Malaysia Super League	9	1	0	0	2	0	6	0	17	1
Johor Darul Ta'zim	2019	Malaysia Super League	20	1	0	0	10	0	5	0	34	1
Johor Darul Ta'zim	2020	Malaysia Super League	11	1	0	0	1	0	2	0	14	1
Johor Darul Ta'zim	2021	Malaysia Super League	17	0	–		11	0	4	0	32	0
Johor Darul Ta'zim	2022	Malaysia Super League	16	1	5 (Note: 4 appearances at the 2022 Malaysia FA Cup and 1 appearances at the 2022 Piala Sumbangsih)	1	6	0	6	0	33	2
Johor Darul Ta'zim	2023	Malaysia Super League	18	0	2	0	4	0	6	0	30	0
Johor Darul Ta'zim	Total		108	4	11	1	42	0	33	0	194	5
Career total			159	5	13	1	49	0	33	0	254	6

=== International ===
As of 4 September 2024

Appearances and goals by national team and year
National team	Year	Apps	Goals
Malaysia	2017	1	0
Malaysia	2018	1	0
Malaysia	2019	2	0
Malaysia	2023	1	0
Malaysia	2024	2	0
Total		7	0

== Honours ==
=== Club ===
Johor Darul Ta'zim

- Malaysia Super League: 2017, 2018, 2019, 2020, 2021, 2022, 2023, 2024–25
- Malaysia Cup: 2017, 2019, 2022, 2023, 2024–25
- Malaysia Charity Shield: 2018, 2019, 2020, 2021, 2022, 2023, 2024, 2025
- Malaysia FA Cup: 2022, 2023, 2024, 2025

=== International ===
Malaysia

- Pestabola Merdeka : 2024

=== Individual ===
- FAM Football Awards – Best Midfielder: 2022, 2023
- FAM Football Awards – Team of the Season: 2022, 2023
