= Nazmi Faiz =

Malaysian footballer

Nazmi Faiz Mansor
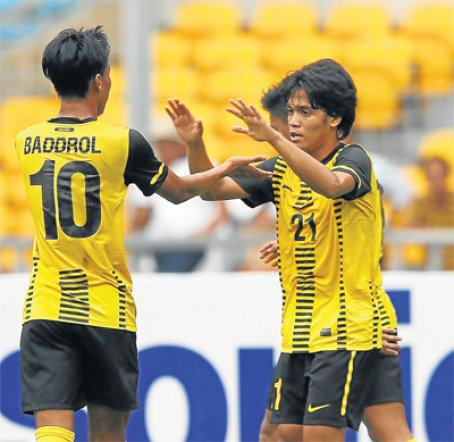
- Nazmi Faiz (right) with his teammate, Baddrol Bakhtiar (left)

Personal information
- Full name: Muhamad Nazmi Faiz bin Mansor
- Date of birth: 16 August 1994 (age 32)
- Place of birth: Selangor, Malaysia
- Height: 1.67 m (5 ft 6 in)
- Position: Midfielder

Team information
- Current team: Kuching City (on loan from Johor Darul Ta'zim)

Senior career*
Years	Team	Apps	(Gls)
2011	Harimau Muda B	19	(0)
2012	Harimau Muda A	10	(2)
2013	Beira-Mar	0	(0)
2013–2014	PKNS	23	(2)
2014–2016	Selangor	43	(2)
2017–	Johor Darul Ta'zim	105	(6)
2026–	→ Kuching City (loan)	0	(0)

International career^{‡}
2011–2015	Malaysia U23	38	(1)
2013–	Malaysia	26	(0)
Medal record
Men's football
Representing Malaysia
FIFA ASEAN Cup
Third place	2026
King's Cup
Runner-up	2022
Malaysia U23
Sea Games
Gold medal – first place	Sea Games 2011	Football
- * Club domestic league appearances and goals as of 30 June 2026 ‡ National team caps and goals as of 6 October 2026

Muhamad Nazmi Faiz bin Mansor (born 16 August 1994) is a Malaysian professional footballer who plays for Malaysia Super League club Kuching City, on loan from Johor Darul Ta’zim, and the Malaysia national team. Nazmi plays mainly as a central midfielder but can also play as an attacking midfielder or as a defensive midfielder, usually deployed as a deep-lying playmaker.

== Club career ==
=== Harimau Muda ===
A product of the Sekolah Projek Sukan Selangor (Sekolah Menengah Kebangsaan Seksyen 11 in Shah Alam and Bukit Jalil Sports School), Nazmi made his way through Harimau Muda B and later was drafted into Harimau Muda A for the 2012 S. League campaign under Ong Kim Swee.

=== Beira Mar ===
On 21 May 2012, Nazmi signed a three-year contract with Portuguese team Beira-Mar after being scouted by the Aveiro based club.

Nazmi made his debut with Beira-Mar in a friendly match against CD Tondela which ended in a 1–1 draw. Due to his young age, he was frequently drafted into the Under-19 youth team of the club. He scored his first goal for the Under-19s just a few days after his 18th birthday. After six months, Nazmi terminated his contract with the club due to personal problems

=== PKNS ===
Nazmi joined Malaysian Super League side PKNS on a three-year deal after officially terminating his contract with Beira-Mar. Nazmi were given the number 33 on his jersey and made his debut for the club in a league match against Perak on 12 April 2013, which ended in a 2–2 draw, during which he set up both goals for his team, which were both scored by Patrick Wleh. Nazmi scored his first goal for the club in a 1–0 win against Negeri Sembilan on 22 June.

=== Selangor ===
Nazmi left PKNS halfway of the season and officially joined Selangor on 21 April 2014, having signed a contract valid for two and a half years with Selangor until 30 November 2016. Nazmi was slapped with a six-match ban by the Football Association of Malaysia disciplinary committee for spitting at Kelantan's Erwin Carrillo in a Super League match at the Shah Alam Stadium on 19 April 2015. Nazmi then helped the club win the 2015 Malaysia Cup after beating Kedah in the final.

=== Johor Darul Ta'zim ===
In December 2016, Nazmi left Selangor and signed a two-year contract with champions Johor Darul Ta'zim.

Nazmi made his competitive debut in the 2017 AFC Champions League qualifying play-offs against Bangkok United. He scored his goal for the club in a 3–0 victory against Boeung Ket Angkor during the 2018 AFC Cup group stage. At the end of the season, he picked up a Malaysia Super League medal and helped lift a 4th consecutive title for Johor.

==== Kuching City ====
On 4 July 2026, after 9 years and 6 months at the club, Nazmi was sent on loan to Sarawak club Kuching City amid rumoured interest from Immigration. He follows Dylan Wenzel-Halls as the second signing of the transfer window, as manager Aidil Sharin Sahak prepares for the AFC Champions League Two.

== International career ==
=== Youth ===
At the age of 17, Nazmi were selected for the 2011 Southeast Asian Games in Indonesia where Malaysia national under 23 team won the gold medal. He scored his first international goal against Bahrain national under 23 team during the 2012 Olympic qualification at the Bukit Jalil National Stadium. He also participated in 2013 Southeast Asian Games, 2015 Southeast Asian Games and 2014 Asian Games.

=== Malaysia ===
Nazmi Faiz made his official debut for Malaysia in a friendly against Kuwait on 8 November 2013.

== Career statistics ==
=== Club ===
As of match played 16 December 2023

Appearances and goals by club, season and competition
Club	Season	League			Cup (Note: Includes Malaysia FA Cup and Singapore Cup)		League Cup (Note: Includes Malaysia Cup)		Continental (Note: Includes AFC Champions League and AFC Cup)		Total	
Club	Season	Division	Apps	Goals	Apps	Goals	Apps	Goals	Apps	Goals	Apps	Goals
Harimau Muda B	2011	Malaysia Premier League	19	0	2 (Note: 1 appearances against Selangor in 2011 Malaysia FA Cup and 1 appearances against Hougang United in 2011 Singapore Cup.)	0	—		—		21	0
Harimau Muda B	Total		19	0	2	0	—		—		21	0
Harimau Muda A	2012	S.League	10	2	—		—		—		10	2
Harimau Muda A	Total		10	2	—		—		—		10	2
Beira-Mar	2012–13	Primeira Liga	0	0	0	0	0	0	—		0	0
Beira-Mar	Total		0	0	0	0	0	0	—		0	0
PKNS	2013	Malaysia Super League	11	1	—		6	0	—		17	1
PKNS	2014	Malaysia Super League	12	1	4	0	—		—		16	1
PKNS	Total		23	2	4	0	6	0	—		33	2
Selangor	2014	Malaysia Super League	6	0	0	0	8	0	—		14	0
Selangor	2015	Malaysia Super League	21	1	2	0	9	1	—		32	2
Selangor	2016	Malaysia Super League	16	1	1	0	6	1	6	0	29	2
Selangor	Total		43	2	3	0	23	2	6	0	75	4
Johor Darul Ta'zim	2017	Malaysia Super League	5	0	3	0	8	1	5	2	21	3
Johor Darul Ta'zim	2018	Malaysia Super League	13	2	1	0	4	0	2	0	20	2
Johor Darul Ta'zim	2019	Malaysia Super League	13	2	1	0	5	0	6	0	25	2
Johor Darul Ta'zim	2020	Malaysia Super League	8	1	0	0	1	0	2	0	11	1
Johor Darul Ta'zim	2021	Malaysia Super League	11	1	—		7	0	4	0	22	1
Johor Darul Ta'zim	2022	Malaysia Super League	15	0	5 (Note: 1 appearances and 1 goal in 2022 Piala Sumbangsih and 4 appearances and 1 goal in 2022 Malaysia FA Cup.)	2	5	1	6	0	31	3
Johor Darul Ta'zim	2023	Malaysia Super League	5	0	0	0	0	0	0	0	5	0
Johor Darul Ta'zim	Total		70	6	10	2	30	2	25	2	135	12
Career total			165	12	19	2	59	4	31	2	274	20

=== International ===
Malaysia national team
Year	Apps	Goals
2013	2	0
2016	1	0
2017	1	0
2018	6	0
2021	3	0
2022	4	0
2025	5	0
2026	4	0
Total	26	0

== Honours ==
=== Club ===
Selangor

- Malaysia Cup: 2015

Johor Darul Ta'zim

- Malaysia Super League: 2017, 2018, 2019, 2020, 2021, 2022, 2023, 2024–25
- Malaysia FA Cup: 2022, 2023, 2024, 2025
- Malaysia Cup: 2017, 2019, 2022, 2023, 2024–25
- Piala Sumbangsih: 2020, 2022, 2024

=== International ===
Malaysia U-23

- SEA Games: 2011

Malaysia

- King's Cup runner-up: 2022

=== Individual ===
- AFC Cup Goal of the Tournament: 2017
