= Syazwan Andik =

Malaysian footballer

Personal information
- Full name: Muhammad Syazwan bin Andik Mohd Ishak
- Date of birth: 4 August 1996 (age 30)
- Place of birth: Skudai, Johor, Malaysia
- Height: 1.77 m (5 ft 9 1/2 in)
- Position: Left back

Team information
- Current team: Kuala Lumpur City
- Number: 23

Youth career
- 2013–2015: Harimau Muda B

Senior career*
Years	Team	Apps	(Gls)
2016–2017	Johor Darul Ta'zim II	19	(2)
2018	Kuala Lumpur City	18	(0)
2019–2024	Johor Darul Ta'zim	13	(0)
2019–2022	Johor Darul Ta'zim II	32	(1)
2022	→ Melaka United (loan)	17	(1)
2023	→ Sri Pahang (loan)	21	(1)
2024–2025	Sri Pahang	14	(1)
2025–	Kuala Lumpur City	0	(0)

International career^{‡}
2016–2018	Malaysia U-23	24	(2)
2018–	Malaysia	18	(1)
Medal record
Representing Malaysia
Men's football
AFF Championship
Runner-up	2018
Malaysia under-23
Sea Games
Silver medal – second place	Sea Games 2017	Football
- * Club domestic league appearances and goals as of 09 December 2022 ‡ National team caps and goals as of 09 November 2019

Muhammad Syazwan bin Andik Mohd Ishak (born 4 August 1996) is a Malaysian professional footballer who plays as a left back for Malaysia Super League side Kuala Lumpur City and the Malaysia national team.

== Club career ==
=== Harimau Muda B ===
Syazwan Andik began his career with Harimau Muda B. Later, he was promoted to the Malaysia U22 in 2015 under coach Frank Bernhardt.

=== Johor Darul Ta'zim II ===
In early 2016, Syazwan joined Malaysia Premier League club, Johor Darul Ta'zim II.

=== Kuala Lumpur City ===
On 29 January 2018, Syazwan signed a two-year contract with Malaysia Super League side Kuala Lumpur City He made Malaysia Super League debut on 4 February 2018 against Selangor.

=== Johor Darul Ta'zim ===
On 12 January 2019, Syazwan's contract with Kuala Lumpur City was not supposed to be terminated but the Skudai-born decided to leave with a termination of contract as the club failed to settle his salary for over two months in 2018. The termination of contract was permissible as there is a clause in their contracts stating that players can decide to leave and make their own path with other clubs, without having to discuss between clubs, if the current club did not manage to pay for more than a month thus returning to Johor to sign with Johor Darul Ta'zim.

==== Loan to Melaka United ====
In December 2021, Syazwan was loaned out to Melaka United for regular playing time ahead of the 2022 Malaysia Super League season. He make his debut for the club in a league match against Sabah on 5 April 2022. Syazwan then scored his first goal in a 2–3 lost against Sarawak United.

=== Sri Pahang ===
On 28 December 2022, Syazwan was loaned out to Sri Pahang ahead of the 2023 Malaysia Super League season. He make his club debut in a league match against Selangor on 5 March 2023. He then scored his first club goal on 26 November 2023 against Penang in a 2–3 lost.

On 23 January 2024, Syazwan permanently joined Sri Pahang on a free transfer.

== International career ==
Syazwan made his debut for Malaysia national team on 1 April 2018 against Bhutan coming off the bench for Mahali Jasuli. On 10 September 2018, he scored his first international goal against Cambodia.

== Career statistics ==
=== Club ===
As of 16 July 2019.

Appearances and goals by club, season and competition
Club	Season	League			Cup		League Cup		Continental		Total	
Club	Season	Division	Apps	Goals	Apps	Goals	Apps	Goals	Apps	Goals	Apps	Goals
Johor Darul Ta'zim II	2016	Malaysia Premier League	0	0	0	0	0	0	–		0	0
Johor Darul Ta'zim II	2017	Malaysia Premier League	19	2	1	0	0	0	–		20	2
Johor Darul Ta'zim II	Total		0	0	0	0	0	0	0	0	0	0
Kuala Lumpur	2018	Malaysia Super League	18	0	4	1	0	0	–		22	1
Kuala Lumpur	Total		18	0	4	1	0	0	0	0	22	1
Johor Darul Ta'zim	2019	Malaysia Super League	3	0	1	0	0	0	–		4	0
Johor Darul Ta'zim II	2019	Malaysia Premier League	9	0	0	0	0	0	–		9	0
Career total			0	0	0	0	0	0	0	0	0	0

=== International ===
As of 9 November 2019

Malaysia
Year	Apps	Goals
2018	12	1
2019	6	0
Total	18	1

==== International goals ====
As of match played 10 September 2018. Malaysia score listed first, score column indicates score after each Syazwan Andik goal.

International goals by date, venue, cap, opponent, score, result and competition
No.	Date	Venue	Cap	Opponent	Score	Result	Competition
1	10 September 2018	Phnom Penh Olympic Stadium, Phnom Penh, Cambodia	4	Cambodia	2–1	3–1	Friendly

=== U23 international goals ===
As of July 2017.

#	Date	Venue	Opponent	Score	Result	Competition
1.	23 July 2017	National Stadium, Thailand	Mongolia	2–0	Win	2018 AFC U-23 Championship qualification

== Honours ==
=== Club ===
Johor Darul Takzim F.C

- Malaysia Charity Shield: 2019

=== International ===
Malaysia U-23

- Southeast Asian Games

(silver) Silver Medal: 2017

Malaysia

- AFF Championship runners up: 2018
