= Kiko Insa =

Footballer (born 1988)

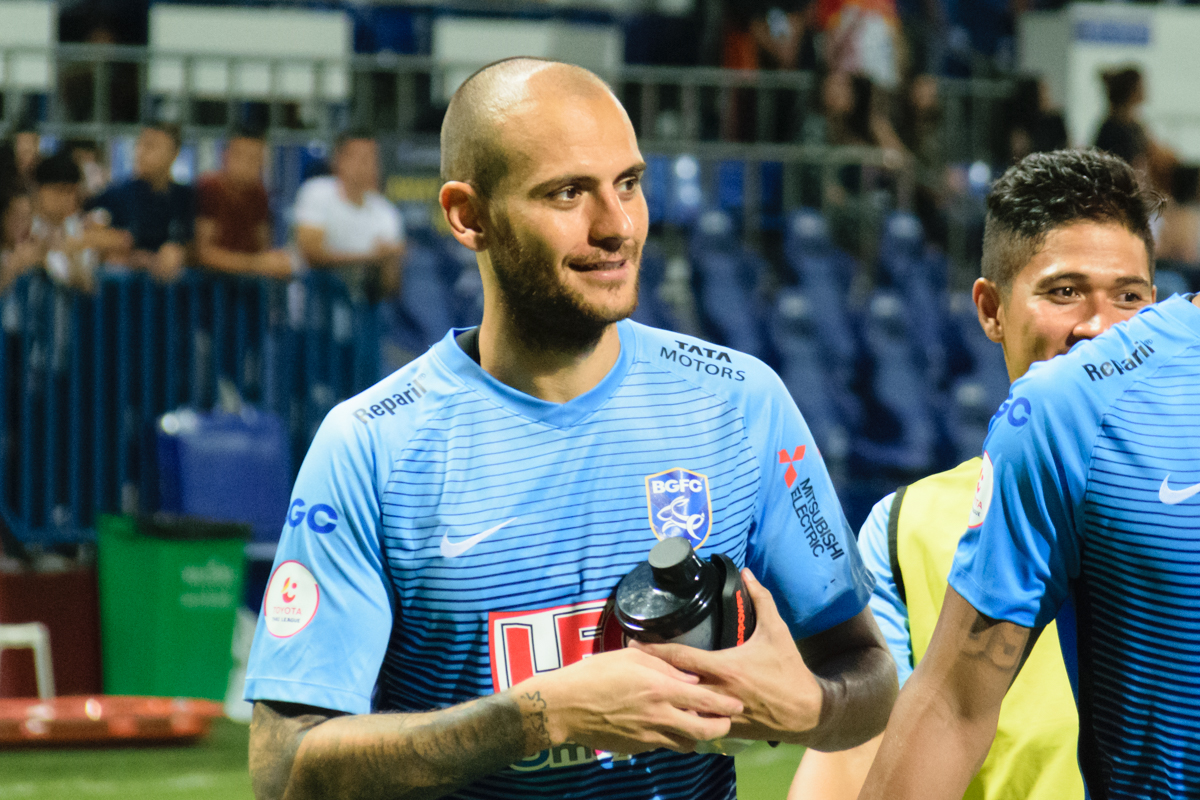
- Insa with Bangkok Glass in 2018
- Born: Francisco Javier Insa Bohigues; 25 January 1988 (age 38); Alicante, Spain
- Occupations: Football Scout Coordinator; Chief Executive Officer; Football agent; Footballer
- Organisation: Insa Project Global Group
- Height: 6 ft 2 in (1.88 m)
- Relatives: Natxo Insa (brother)
Association football career
- Positions: Centre back; midfielder
Youth career
- Valencia CF
- Albacete
Senior career*
Years	Team	Apps	(Gls)
2005–2006	Albacete B	3	(0)
2006–2007	Real Murcia B	8	(0)
2007–2008	Alcoyano	13	(0)
2008	Elche B	4	(0)
2008–2009	Namur	4	(1)
2009–2010	Caravaca	16	(0)
2010–2011	Onda	9	(0)
2011–2012	Ribarroja	21	(2)
2012–2013	Rápido de Bouzas	7	(0)
2013–2014	Víkingur Ólafsvík	15	(1)
2014	FK Ventspils	15	(0)
2014–2015	Oxford City	2	(0)
2015	Keflavík	7	(0)
2015–2016	Arema	12	(2)
2016	→ Bali United (loan)	9	(2)
2017	Pahang	11	(0)
2018	Bangkok Glass	4	(0)
2018	Johor Darul Ta'zim	5	(0)
2019–2020	Johor Darul Ta'zim II	11	(0)
Total		176	(8)
International career
2017	Malaysia	6	(0)
- * Club domestic league appearances and goals

Francisco Javier Insa Bohigues (born 25 January 1988), better known as Kiko Insa, is a football agent and former professional footballer who played mainly as a centre-back but could also play as a defensive midfielder or as a central midfielder. Born in Spain, he represented the Malaysia national team.

== Club career ==
=== Early career ===
Insa is a football journeyman. He had played in Spanish Third Division with CD Alcoyano in 2007-2008 and also in the Belgium league with UR Namur.

=== Bali United (loan) ===
On 29 February 2016, Insa signed with Indonesian club Bali United on loan deal from Arema. Insa made his debut for Bali United in a match against Pusamania Borneo.

=== Pahang ===
In January 2017, Kiko Insa signed a one-year contract with Malaysia Super League club Pahang as a Malaysian naturalisation. That means he is eligible to play in Malaysia Football League under Malaysian quota. On 21 January 2017, Insa made his league debut for Pahang in 1–1 draw against Perak at Perak Stadium.

=== Bangkok Glass ===
On 2 February 2018, Insa signed a one-year contract with Thai League 1 club Bangkok Glass. Insa made his Thai League 1 debut in a 0–0 draw against Navy on 24 February 2018.

=== Johor Darul Ta'zim ===
He ended his stint with Bangkok Glass and joined Johor Darul Ta'zim in May 2018.

== International career ==
Kiko Insa was called up by Malaysia manager Nelo Vingada to the training camp from 14 August 2017 until 5 September 2017. He made his first appearance for 60 minutes during Malaysia's 2–1 friendly loss against Syria.

== Personal life ==
Kiko Insa was born in Alicante, Spain. Kiko Insa is eligible to play for the Malaysia national team after he obtained Malaysian citizenship through his grandmother who was born in Sabah. He can speak both Malay and Indonesian fluently from his stints at Arema and Bali United. His brother, Natxo, is also a professional footballer who is currently plays for Johor Darul Ta'zim.

== Career statistics ==
=== Club ===
Appearances and goals by club, season and competition
Club	Season	League			National cup		League cup		Continental		Total	
Club	Season	Division	Apps	Goals	Apps	Goals	Apps	Goals	Apps	Goals	Apps	Goals
Bali United	2016	Indonesia Soccer Championship A	9	2	5	0	0	0	–		14	2
Pahang	2017	Malaysia Super League	11	0	4	0	3	0	–		18	0
Bangkok Glass	2018	Thai League 1	0	0	0	0	0	0	–		0	0
Career total									–			

=== International ===
Appearances and goals by national team and year
National team	Year	Apps	Goals
Malaysia	2017	6	0
Total		6	0

== Honours ==
Johor Darul Ta'zim

- Malaysia Super League: 2018, 2019
- Malaysia Charity Shield: 2019, 2020

Johor Darul Ta'zim II

- Malaysia Challenge Cup: 2019
