= Natxo Insa =

Footballer (born 1986)

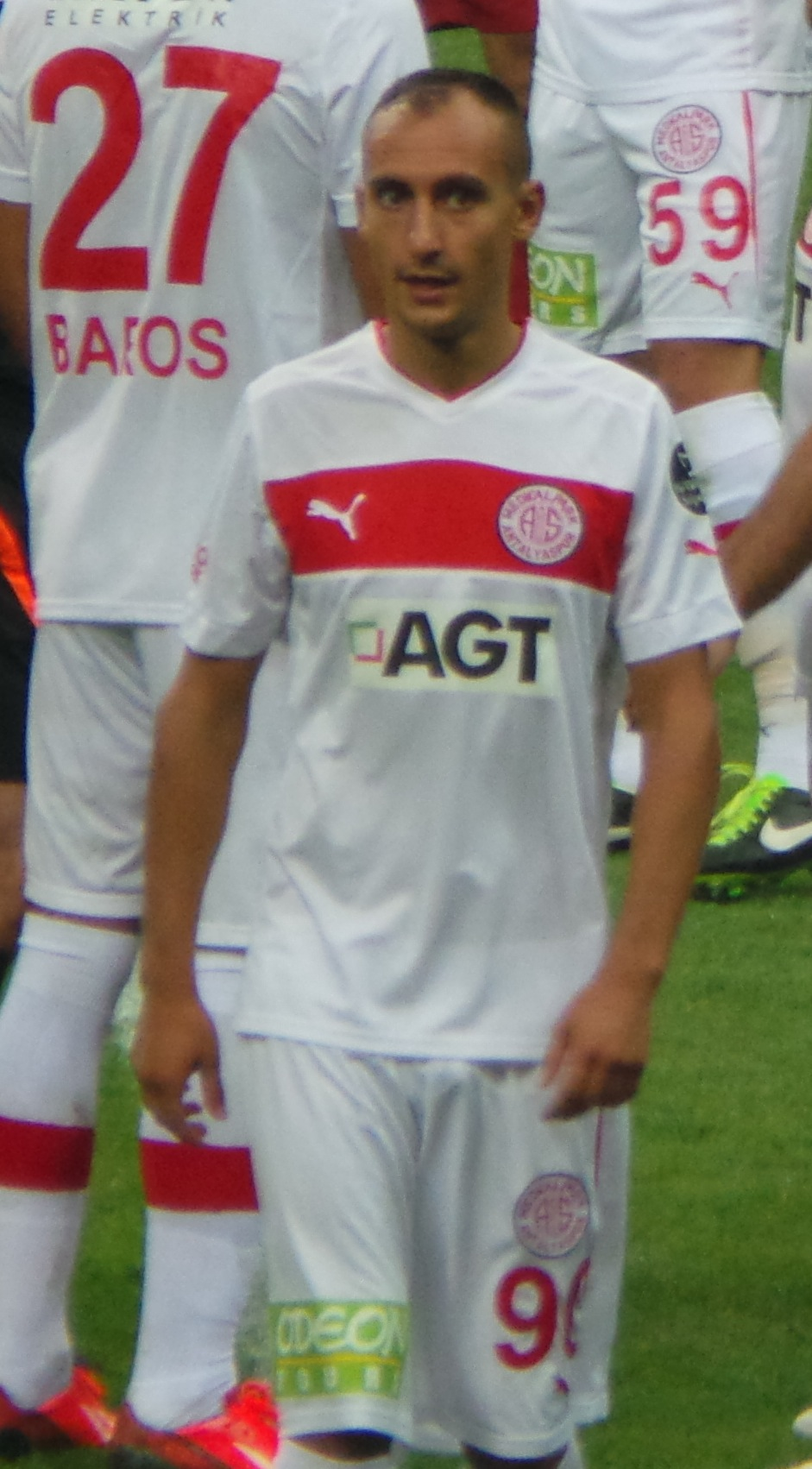
- Insa with Antalyaspor in 2013

Personal information
- Full name: Ignacio Insa Bohigues
- Date of birth: 9 June 1986 (age 40)
- Place of birth: Cocentaina, Spain
- Height: 1.78 m (5 ft 10 in)
- Position: Midfielder

Team information
- Current team: Johor Darul Ta'zim
- Number: 30

Youth career
- Valencia

Senior career*
Years	Team	Apps	(Gls)
2006–2007	Valencia B	36	(2)
2007–2009	Valencia	1	(0)
2007–2009	→ Eibar (loan)	56	(3)
2009–2011	Villarreal B	74	(2)
2011	Villarreal	1	(0)
2011–2013	Celta	46	(3)
2013–2014	Antalyaspor	16	(0)
2015	Zaragoza	17	(0)
2015–2016	Alcorcón	34	(2)
2016–2017	Levante	35	(2)
2017–	Johor Darul Ta'zim	96	(6)

International career
2018–2024	Malaysia	2	(0)
- * Club domestic league appearances and goals as of 02:00, 22 November 2026 (UTC)

Ignacio 'Natxo' Insa Bohigues (born 9 June 1986) is a professional footballer who plays as a midfielder for Malaysian club Johor Darul Ta'zim.

He spent most of his career in the Segunda División, playing 244 matches and scoring ten goals for Eibar, Villarreal B, Celta, Zaragoza, Alcorcón and Levante. In La Liga, he represented Villarreal's first team and Celta.

Born in Spain, Insa appeared for Malaysia internationally, making his debut in 2018.

== Club career ==
Insa was born in Cocentaina, Province of Alicante, Valencian Community. A product of Valencia CF's youth ranks, he made his first-team debut in a friendly with Fenerbahçe S.K. in July 2006, but spent the vast majority of that season with the B side in the Segunda División B. He first appeared officially for the main squad on 5 December 2006, coming on as an early substitute in a UEFA Champions League game at AS Roma (1–0 group stage loss). He played his first La Liga match on 17 June of the following year, featuring the last six minutes of the 3–3 home draw against Real Sociedad.

Insa was loaned to Segunda División club SD Eibar in 2007–08, scoring twice in 33 appearances. The deal was renewed for the following campaign, where he appeared slightly less and also suffered relegation.

In August 2009, Insa moved to Villarreal CF, spending his first season with the reserves also in the second division. He played just one competitive match with the first team, 11 minutes in a 1–0 away defeat to CA Osasuna.

From 2011 to 2013, Insa represented RC Celta de Vigo. In the latter campaign he scored two goals, the first in a 2–2 home draw against FC Barcelona and the second in a 1–0 victory over RCD Espanyol also at Balaídos; that last matchday win ultimately proved essential, as the Galicians eventually avoided relegation.

After a one-year spell abroad at Turkey's Antalyaspor, Insa returned to Spain and its second tier in January 2015, appearing for Real Zaragoza, AD Alcorcón and Levante UD in quick succession. On 6 June 2017, he signed with Malaysia Super League's Johor Darul Ta'zim F.C. for a fee of nearly €400,000.

== International career ==
Insa obtained Malaysian citizenship through his grandmother, who was born in Sabah. He won his first cap for their national team on 22 March 2018 at the age of 31, in a 2–2 friendly draw with Mongolia.

In June 2023, five years after his first appearance, Insa was called up by the second time for friendlies against Solomon Islands and Papua New Guinea to be held that month. He did not take the field on either match, only featuring again on 20 January 2024 in the 1–0 loss to Bahrain in the group stage of the 2023 AFC Asian Cup, subsequently facing heavy criticism for his performance.

== Style of play ==
Insa was described as a defensive midfielder with a high work rate and tactical discipline. According to Malaysia national team coach Peter Cklamovski, he was capable of dictating the tempo of a match by either slowing down or accelerating play. His physical performance data was cited as satisfactory by the Asian Football Confederation, while he was considered to possess attributes that aligned with an attacking and structured tactical approach.

== Personal life ==
Insa's younger brother, Kiko, is also a former Malaysian international footballer.

== Career statistics ==
=== Club ===
As of 11 January 2025

Appearances and goals by club, season and competition
Club	Season	League			Cup		Continental		Total	
Club	Season	Division	Apps	Goals	Apps	Goals	Apps	Goals	Apps	Goals
Valencia B	2006–07	Segunda División B	34	2	—		2 (Note: Appearances in Segunda División B relegation play-offs)	0	36	2
Valencia	2006–07	La Liga	1	0	0	0	1 (Note: Appearances in UEFA Champions League)	0	2	0
Eibar (loan)	2007–08	Segunda División	33	2	1	0	—		34	2
Eibar (loan)	2008–09	Segunda División	23	1	0	0	—		23	1
Eibar (loan)	Total		56	3	1	0	—		57	3
Villarreal B	2009–10	Segunda División	34	2	—		—		34	2
Villarreal B	2010–11	Segunda División	40	0	—		—		40	0
Villarreal B	Total		74	2	—		—		74	2
Villarreal	2010–11	La Liga	1	0	0	0	—		1	0
Celta	2011–12	Segunda División	28	1	3	0	—		31	1
Celta	2012–13	La Liga	18	2	0	0	—		18	2
Celta	Total		46	3	3	0	—		49	3
Antalyaspor	2013–14	Süper Lig	16	0	4	1	—		20	1
Zaragoza	2014–15	Segunda División	17	0	0	0	—		17	0
Alcorcón	2015–16	Segunda División	34	2	1	0	—		35	2
Levante	2016–17	Segunda División	35	2	0	0	—		35	2
Johor Darul Ta'zim	2017	Malaysia Super League	9	2	9	2	—		18	4
Johor Darul Ta'zim	2018	Malaysia Super League	14	3	4 (Note: Appearances in Malaysia FA Cup and Malaysia Cup)	0	5 (Note: Appearances in AFC Champions League qualifying play-offs and AFC Cup)	0	22	2
Johor Darul Ta'zim	2019	Malaysia Super League	3	0	0	0	1 (Note: Appearances in AFC Champions League)	0	4	0
Johor Darul Ta'zim	2020	Malaysia Super League	6	0	0	0	2	0	8	0
Johor Darul Ta'zim	2021	Malaysia Super League	19	1	0	0	5	0	24	1
Johor Darul Ta'zim	2022	Malaysia Super League	15	0	1	0	5	0	21	0
Johor Darul Ta'zim	2023	Malaysia Super League	7	0	1	0	2	0	10	0
Johor Darul Ta'zim	2024–25	Malaysia Super League	8	0	3	0	4	0	15	0
Johor Darul Ta'zim	Total		81	6	18	2	24	0	123	8
Career total			383	19	24	3	18	0	429	21

=== International ===
Appearances and goals by national team and year
National team	Year	Apps	Goals
Malaysia	2018	1	0
Malaysia	2024	1	0
Total		2	0

== Honours ==
Levante

- Segunda División: 2016–17

Johor Darul Ta'zim

- Malaysia Super League: 2017, 2018, 2019, 2020, 2021, 2022, 2023, 2024–25
- Malaysia FA Cup: 2022, 2024, 2025
- Malaysia Cup: 2017, 2019, 2022, 2023, 2024–25
- Piala Sumbangsih: 2018, 2019, 2020, 2021, 2022, 2024, 2025

Individual

- Malaysia Super League Player of the Month: October 2017
