= 2020 Piala Sumbangsih =

| Johor Darul Ta'zim | Kedah |
| 1 | 0 |
- Date: 28 February 2020
- Venue: Sultan Ibrahim Stadium, Iskandar Puteri
- Man of the Match: Maurício
- Referee: Razlan Jeffri Ali
- Attendance: 34,525

The 2020 Piala Sumbangsih was the 35th edition of the Piala Sumbangsih, an annual football match played between the winners of the previous season's Malaysia Super League and Malaysia Cup. Since both competitions were won by Johor Darul Ta'zim in the previous season, they instead played against the 2019 Malaysia FA Cup winners, Kedah.

Johor Darul Ta'zim won the match 1–0, winning their fifth Piala Sumbangsih title.

== Match details ==
28 February 2020
21:00 UTC+8

| Johor Darul Ta'zim | 1–0 | Kedah |
|---|---|---|
| Maurício 44' | Report |

Sultan Ibrahim Stadium, Iskandar Puteri, Johor
Attendance: 34,525
Referee: Razlan Jeffri Ali

| GK | 1 | Farizal Marlias |
| DF | 22 | La'Vere Corbin-Ong |
| DF | 33 | Maurício |
| DF | 7 | Aidil Zafuan | (yellow card) 30' | (substituted off) 67' |
| DF | 2 | Matthew Davies |
| MF | 18 | Leandro Velázquez | (yellow card) 25' | (substituted off) 89' |
| MF | 14 | Hariss Harun |
| MF | 4 | Mohd Afiq Fazail | | (substituted off) 84' |
| FW | 11 | Gonzalo Cabrera |
| FW | 8 | Diogo |
| FW | 29 | Safawi Rasid |
Substitutes:
| FW | 9 | Hazwan Bakri |
| DF | 12 | S. Kunanlan |
| MF | 21 | Nazmi Faiz |
| GK | 24 | Izham Tarmizi |
| DF | 27 | Fadhli Shas | | (substituted on) 67' |
| MF | 30 | Natxo Insa | | (substituted on) 84' |
| MF | 88 | Liridon Krasniqi | | (substituted on) 89' |
Coach:
Benjamin Mora

| GK | 18 | Ifwat Akmal |
| MF | 7 | Baddrol Bakhtiar | (yellow card) 5' |
| FW | 9 | Kpah Sherman |
| FW | 10 | Kipré Tchétché | | (substituted off) 80' |
| DF | 11 | Shakir Hamzah | (yellow card) 49' |
| DF | 15 | Rizal Ghazali |
| MF | 16 | Amirul Hisyam |
| MF | 20 | Fadzrul Danel |
| DF | 25 | Azmeer Yusof |
| MF | 27 | Hadin Azman | (yellow card) 44' | (substituted off) 71' |
| DF | 36 | Renan Alves | (yellow card) 86' |
Substitutes:
| GK | 1 | Azri Ghani |
| MF | 6 | David Rowley |
| FW | 8 | Zaquan Adha | | (substituted on) 90+4' |
| DF | 17 | Irfan Zakaria |
| MF | 21 | Fayadh Zulkifli | | (substituted on) 80' |
| FW | 77 | Azamuddin Akil | | (substituted on) 71' (substituted off) 90+4' |
| MF | 93 | Amin Nazari |
Coach:
Aidil Sharin Sahak

== Winners ==
2020 Piala Sumbangsih

Johor Darul Ta'zim
Fifth title
