= Maurício (footballer, born September 1988) =

Brazilian footballer

Maurício Nascimento
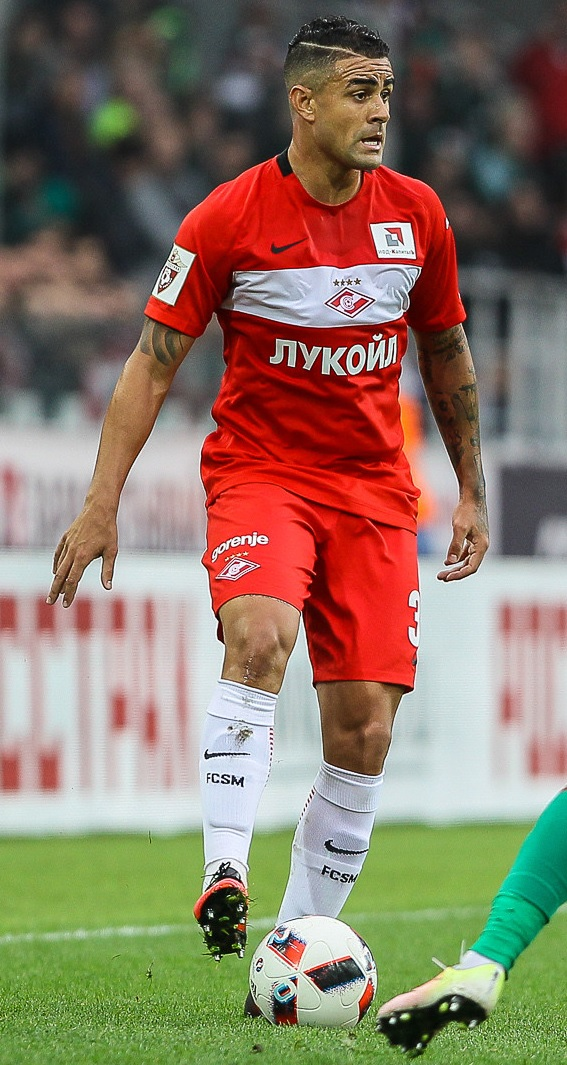
- Maurício with Spartak Moscow in 2016

Personal information
- Full name: Maurício dos Santos Nascimento
- Date of birth: 20 September 1988 (age 38)
- Place of birth: São Paulo, Brazil
- Height: 1.85 m (6 ft 1 in)
- Position: Centre-back

Youth career
- 2003–2007: Palmeiras

Senior career*
Years	Team	Apps	(Gls)
2007–2012	Palmeiras B	0	(0)
2007	→ CRB (loan)		
2008–2012	Palmeiras	25	(1)
2010	→ Grêmio (loan)	0	(0)
2010–2011	→ Portuguesa (loan)	16	(2)
2011	→ Vitória (loan)	24	(3)
2012	→ Joinville (loan)	31	(2)
2013	Sport	3	(0)
2013–2015	Sporting CP	42	(1)
2015	→ Lazio (loan)	15	(0)
2015–2018	Lazio	25	(0)
2016–2017	→ Spartak Moscow (loan)	10	(1)
2018	→ Legia Warsaw (loan)	2	(0)
2019–2022	Johor Darul Ta'zim	46	(1)
2022	Náutico	6	(1)
2023	Chapecoense	7	(1)
- * Club domestic league appearances and goals

Maurício dos Santos Nascimento (born 20 September 1988), known simply as Maurício, is a Brazilian professional footballer who plays as a centre-back.

== Club career ==
Born in São Paulo, Mauricio emerged through Sociedade Esportiva Palmeiras's youth system, and made his professional debuts while on loan at Clube de Regatas Brasil in 2007, in Série B. He returned to Verdão in 2008, appearing in Série A for the first time.

On 18 November 2009, Maurício had an altercation with Palmeiras teammate Obina during half-time of a match against Grêmio Foot-Ball Porto Alegrense, with both being dismissed by the club a day later. He was subsequently loaned to Grêmio, Associação Portuguesa de Desportos, Esporte Clube Vitória and Joinville Esporte Clube, before being released in 2012. On 5 January 2013, he joined Sport Club do Recife.

On 4 July 2013, Maurício moved abroad for the first time, signing a five-year contract with Sporting Clube de Portugal. In his maiden appearance in Primeira Liga, on 18 August, he helped the hosts come from behind against F.C. Arouca to win it 5–1, his goal coming following a corner kick in the 30th minute.

Late into the 2015 January transfer window, Maurício was loaned to Serie A side S.S. Lazio until June, with the club agreeing to buy his sporting rights at the end of the campaign for €2.6 million. The following 29 August, already owned by the Italians, he moved on loan to Russian Premier League's FC Spartak Moscow. He was released by Lazio on 17 October 2018 and signed with Malaysia Super League club Johor Darul Ta'zim F.C. five days later. He scored one goal against South Korea giant Suwon Samsung Bluewings at 2020 AFC Champions League with 2–1 win.

== Honours ==
Palmeiras

- Campeonato Paulista: 2008

Sporting

- Taça de Portugal: 2014–15

Spartak

- Russian Premier League: 2016–17

Legia Warsaw

- Ekstraklasa: 2017–18
- Polish Cup: 2017–18

Johor Darul Ta'zim

- Malaysia Super League: 2019, 2020, 2021
- Malaysia Cup: 2019
- Malaysia Charity Shield: 2019, 2020, 2021

Individual

- Malaysia Charity Shield Man of the Match: 2020
