= Fadhli Shas =

Malaysian footballer (born 1991)

Personal information
- Full name: Mohammad Fadhli bin Mohammad Shas
- Date of birth: 21 January 1991 (age 35)
- Place of birth: Lumut, Perak, Malaysia
- Height: 1.74 m (5 ft 8 1/2 in)
- Position: Centre-back

Youth career
- 2004–2008: Bukit Jalil Sports School
- 2013: Harimau Muda A

Senior career*
Years	Team	Apps	(Gls)
2009–2010	Harimau Muda	?	(1)
2011–2012	Harimau Muda A	37	(1)
2011	→ ViOn Zlaté Moravce (loan)	0	(0)
2014–2023	Johor Darul Ta'zim	81	(5)
2019–2021	→ Johor Darul Ta'zim II	10	(1)
2022	→ Melaka United (loan)	16	(0)
2023–2025	Sri Pahang	7	(0)

International career^{‡}
2010–2014	Malaysia U23	50	(1)
2010–2025	Malaysia	55	(0)
Medal record
Malaysia U23
Sea Games
Gold medal – first place	Jakarta-Palembang 2011	Football
Men's Football
Representing Malaysia
AFF Championship
Winner	AFF Suzuki Cup 2010	2010
Runner-up	AFF Suzuki Cup 2014	2014
- * Club domestic league appearances and goals as of 5 April 2023 ‡ National team caps and goals as of 22 March 2018

Mohammad Fadhli bin Mohammad Shas (born 21 January 1991) is a Malaysian former professional footballer who last played as a defender for Malaysia Super League club Sri Pahang.

Fadhli was born in Lumut in Manjung District situated about 84 km from Ipoh, the capital city of Perak. At his youth, his family moved to Johor.

Fadhli also remarkably scored a goal against English giants Chelsea during their Southeast Asian friendly tour where he scored in the 90+1 stoppage time on 21 July 2013.

== Club career ==
=== Zlaté Moravce ===
In September 2011, Fadhli had played for the Slovak club Zlaté Moravce for a 3-month loan from Harimau Muda A. Fadhli made his debut with the team in a 3–0 win against Spartak Myjava, coming on the 82nd minute replacing Martin Babic.

Fadhli returned to Harimau Muda A shortly after his national duty in the 2011 SEA Games. In total, Fadhli managed to make only 1 official appearance for Zlaté Moravce. In early 2012, popular website for football news, Goal.com has named Fadhli in Asian Under-23 Best XI for the year 2011.

=== Johor Darul Ta'zim ===
On 15 February 2014, Fadhli scored his first goal for Johor Darul Ta'zim in a league match against Selangor.

== International career ==
In November 2010, Fadhli was called up to the Malaysia national squad by coach K. Rajagopal for the 2010 AFF Suzuki Cup. Malaysia won the 2010 AFF Suzuki Cup title for the first time in their history. Fadhli also played in the 2012 AFF Suzuki Cup in which he was the first choice centre back. He was the first choice pair with Mohd Aidil Zafuan Abdul Radzak as the centre back. However, he was sent off during the match against Thailand in the semi-final AFF Suzuki Cup 2012.

== Statistics ==
=== Club ===
As of 5 April 2023

Appearances and goals by club, season and competition
Club	Season	League			Cup		League Cup		Continental		Total	
Club	Season	Division	Apps	Goals	Apps	Goals	Apps	Goals	Apps	Goals	Apps	Goals
Harimau Muda	2009	Malaysia Premier League		1		0	–		–			1
Harimau Muda	2010	Malaysia Premier League		0		0	–		–			0
Harimau Muda	Total			1		0	–		–			1
Harimau Muda A	2011	Malaysia Super League	21	1		0	–		–			1
Harimau Muda A	2012	S.League	16	0	0	0	–		–		16	0
Harimau Muda A	Total		37	1			–		–			1
Zlaté Moravce (loan)	2011–12	Slovak Superliga	0	0	1	0	–		–		1	0
Zlaté Moravce (loan)	Total		0	0	1	0	–		–		1	0
Johor Darul Ta'zim	2014	Malaysia Super League	19	1	5	0	11	0	–		35	1
Johor Darul Ta'zim	2015	Malaysia Super League	17	0	1	0	0	0	9	0	27	0
Johor Darul Ta'zim	2016	Malaysia Super League	4	0	1	0	4	0	3	1	12	1
Johor Darul Ta'zim	2017	Malaysia Super League	14	3	3	1	8	1	5	0	30	5
Johor Darul Ta'zim	2018	Malaysia Super League	15	1	4	0	4	0	4	0	27	1
Johor Darul Ta'zim	2019	Malaysia Super League	4	0	1	0	3	1	1	0	9	1
Johor Darul Ta'zim	2020	Malaysia Super League	8	0	0	0	0	0	1	0	9	0
Johor Darul Ta'zim	2021	Malaysia Super League	0	0	–		–		–		0	0
Johor Darul Ta'zim	Total		81	5	15	1	30	2	23	1	149	9
Johor Darul Ta'zim II	2019	Malaysia Premier League	–		–		1	0	–		1	0
Johor Darul Ta'zim II	2021	Malaysia Premier League	10	1	–		–		–		10	1
Johor Darul Ta'zim II	Total		10	1	–		1	0	–		11	1
Melaka United (loan)	2022	Malaysia Super League	16	0	1	0	–		–		17	0
Melaka United (loan)	Total		16	0	1	0	–		–		17	0
Sri Pahang (loan)	2023	Malaysia Super League	7	0	1	0			–		8	0
Sri Pahang (loan)	Total		7	0	1	0			–		8	0

=== International ===
As of 22 March 2018

Appearances and goals by national team and year
National team	Year	Apps	Goals
Malaysia	2010	6	0
Malaysia	2011	5	0
Malaysia	2012	15	0
Malaysia	2013	2	0
Malaysia	2014	10	0
Malaysia	2015	6	0
Malaysia	2016	8	0
Malaysia	2017	2	0
Malaysia	2018	1	0
Total		55	0

== Honours ==
=== Club ===
Johor Darul Ta'zim

- Malaysian Charity Shield(4): 2015, 2016, 2018, 2020
- Malaysia Super League (7): 2014, 2015, 2016, 2017, 2018, 2019, 2020
- Malaysia FA Cup (1): 2016
- Malaysia Cup (2): 2017, 2019
- 2015 AFC Cup (1): 2015

Johor Darul Ta'zim II

- Malaysia Challenge Cup: 2019

Harimau Muda

- Malaysia Premier League: 2009

=== International ===
Malaysia

- AFF Suzuki Cup: 2010; runner-up 2014

Malaysia U-23

- SEA Games: 2011
- Pestabola Merdeka: 2013

=== Individuals ===
- Goal.com Asian Under-23 Best XI for 2011
