= 2017 Kelantan FA season =

Kelantan
2017 season
- President: Afandi Hamzah (interim); Bibi Ramjani Ilias Khan (from 17 September)
- Head coach: Zahasmi Ismail
- Stadium: Sultan Muhammad IV Stadium
- Liga Super: 10th
- Piala FA: Second round
- Piala Malaysia: Group stage
- Top goalscorer: League: Alessandro Celin (4); All: Mohd Khairul Izuan Rosli (5)
- Highest home attendance: 20,853 vs Kedah (18 February 2017)
- Lowest home attendance: 1,061 vs FELDA United (5 August 2017)
- Average home league attendance: 7,097
- All statistics correct as of 28 October 2017.

The 2017 season was Kelantan's 9th season in the Liga Super since being promoted and 22nd successive season in the top flight of Malaysian football league system. They were competing in the Liga Super, Piala FA and Piala Malaysia after placed in 5th (7th after 3 points was deducted) in 2017 Liga Super first leg matches.

== Season overview ==
=== November ===
On 30 November 2016, Zahasmi Ismail was appointed as the team new head coach, succeeding Velizar Popov in the role.

=== January ===
On 6 January 2017, it's confirmed that Kelantan would be participated in the 2017 Liga Super.

On 12 January 2017, former president, Annuar Musa was appointed as club advisor by Kelantan Football Association.

On 20 January 2017, Kelantan unveiled their 2017 season squad with new three foreign players, and new local players. Mamadou Danso and Alessandro Celin replaced Okiki Afolabi after he failed the club medical test and Cédric Djeugoué got issues with his registration documents. Mohammed Ghaddar have filled the place Asian quota player. New local players signed with Kelantan were Hasmizan Kamarodin, S. Subramaniam, S. Thinagaran and Hattaphon Bun An.

On 21 January 2017, the first league match between Kelantan and Melaka United scheduled at Sultan Muhammad IV Stadium in Kota Bharu has been postponed to another date due to bad weather caused waterlogged pitch.

On 27 January 2017, Kelantan started their league campaign with victory over PKNS with 3–1 scored.

Position at the end of January

Pos	Team	Pld	W	D	L	GF	GA	GD	Pts
6	Kelantan	1	1	0	0	3	1	+2	3

AFC Club Ranking position in January

Rank	Country	Team	Move	MA Pts	Total
93	(Malaysia)	Kelantan FA	▼	2.476	10.809

=== February ===
On 1 February 2017, league match against Johor Darul Ta'zim that was initially scheduled for 4 February 2017 will be postponed due to JDT's AFC Champions League commitments.

On 11 February 2017, Kelantan won 2–1 against FELDA United which was their second league match after having two games postponed before.

On 14 February 2017, during second round of Malaysia FA Cup campaign Kelantan were knocked out of the competition by Malaysia Premier League club PKNP 4–3 on penalty shoot-out after 1–1 draw after extra time.

On 21 February 2017, the rescheduled postponed rematch between Kelantan and Melaka United were held at Sultan Muhammad IV Stadium with the home team lost 0–2 and continued their streak of two games loses without any goals scored.

On 25 February 2017, the sixth league match of Kelantan at home ground ended up losing 0–2 to Selangor which continued their streak of loses without scoring goal in three matches in a row.

Position at the end of February

Pos	Team	Pld	W	D	L	GF	GA	GD	Pts
10	Kelantan	5	2	0	3	5	7	−2	6

AFC Club Ranking position in February

Rank	Country	Team	Move	MA Pts	Total
124	(Malaysia)	Kelantan FA	▼	2.53	4.53

=== March ===
On 1 March 2017, Kelantan secured the third league win over Perak in Perak Stadium. Mohammed Ghaddar scored a hat-trick and 1 goal came from Indra Putra Mahayuddin.

On 4 March 2017, Kelantan finally achieved their first win at their home ground after a straight three losses before and making it their second consecutive win in the league after beating T-Team 4–2 with Mohammed Ghaddar scored his second hat-trick and a goal came from Mohd Khairul Izuan Rosli.

On 7 March, Mohammed Ghaddar was announced as PFAM Player of the Month for February candidate.

Position at the end of March

Pos	Team	Pld	W	D	L	GF	GA	GD	Pts
6	Kelantan	7	4	0	3	13	11	+2	12

AFC Club Ranking position in March

Rank	Country	Team	Move	MA Pts	Total
126	(Malaysia)	Kelantan FA	▲	2.555	4.555

=== April ===
The team having a long break after the last match on 4 March 2017. This is due in conjunction with the Piala FA Matches. Kelantan started April league campaign with a defeat 1—2 against Pahang during home match in Kota Bharu. On 12 April, another rescheduled match between Kelantan against the defending champion, Johor Darul Ta'zim was held that resulted in another loss for Kelantan after the away team made a comeback to overturn the 2-goal lead from Kelantan both scored by Mohammed Ghaddar resulted in a 2–3 defeat. On 15 April, Kelantan continued their unbeaten streak outside of Sultan Muhammad IV Stadium by winning 5–1 against Penang with 4 goals contributed by Mohammed Ghaddar making it his third hat trick this season. On 29 April, Mohammed Ghaddar was announced as PFAM Player of the Month for April candidate. On 30 April, Alfredo Carlos González Machado has been appointed as the new technical director of the team and Sanna Nyassi was introduced as a potential candidate to replace Alessandro Celin in the second transfer window.

Position at the end of April

Pos	Team	Pld	W	D	L	GF	GA	GD	Pts
5	Kelantan	11	5	1	5	21	17	+4	16

AFC Club Ranking position in April

Rank	Country	Team	Move	MA Pts	Total
127	(Malaysia)	Kelantan FA	▲	2.625	4.625

=== May ===
On 1 May, Kelantan and Johor Darul Ta'zim were fined RM10,000 due to their fan action with Kelantan fan were reported to have thrown bottles onto the pitch during the postponed match between Kelantan against Johor Darul Ta'zim.

On 2 May, Kelantan were deducted 6 points after failing to complete M-League registration process thus resulted in league standing change from number 5 to number 7.

On 6 May, Kelantan won 2–3 against Pahang making them still undefeated at away ground.

On 9 May, Mohammed Ghaddar was announced as the April Liga Super Player of the Month.

Second transfer window started on 15 May and will ended on 11 June, during this time span, some transfer activity among Kelantan FA player happened. Among them is Mohammed Ghaddar who was sold to Johor Darul Ta'zim for RM1,400,000.00 and his replacement, Abou Bakr Al-Mel from AC Tripoli.Nik Shahrul Azim was loaned out to Negeri Sembilan for 6 month.

On 24 May, Kelantan drew 2–2 against Penang at their home ground before the league take a rest period for more than a month due to Ramadan and national team games.

Position at the end of May

Pos	Team	Pld	W	D	L	GF	GA	GD	Pts
8	Kelantan	13	6	2	5	27	21	+6	20

AFC Club Ranking position in May

Rank	Country	Team	Move	MA Pts	Total
126	(Malaysia)	Kelantan FA	Steady	2.625	4.625

=== June ===
There were no competitive matches played during this month. Fakhrul Zaman and Muhd Shahrul Hakim Rahim were loaned out to MISC-MIFA.

On 17 June, there were some changes in the club officials with Alfredo Carlos Gonzales will be taking Datuk Rosmadi Ismail place as the Team Manager while Datuk Rosmadi Ismail and his assistant Datuk Muhammad Nasir Hamzah will become the Contingent Leader and Assistant Contingent Leader respectively during any matchday involving the club.

On 18 June, the club were given 3 points back from the 6 points deduction thus making them goes up to 5th place.

Position at the end of June

Pos	Team	Pld	W	D	L	GF	GA	GD	Pts
8	Kelantan	13	6	2	5	27	21	+6	20

=== July ===
Starting 1 July 2017, Kelantan has suffered 5 successive league defeats. Somehow, Kelantan began their Malaysia Cup campaign with winning against UiTM in their home match.

Position at the end of July

Pos	Team	Pld	W	D	L	GF	GA	GD	Pts
9	Kelantan	18	6	2	10	27	34	−7	20

=== September ===
On 17 December 2017, Bibi Ramjani Ilias Khan was voted in as the new president of Kelantan Football Association for the term 2018–2021. She was appointed to the top post of the association after defeating Datuk Muhammad Nasir Hamzah in the voting process. Datuk Seri Afandi Hamzah defended his deputy president post, overcoming Datuk Rosmadi Ismail in the process.

Position at the end of September

Pos	Team	Pld	W	D	L	GF	GA	GD	Pts
11	Kelantan	21	6	4	11	28	38	−10	22

== Kit ==
Shirt Sponsor: HORC
Main Sponsors: redONE, Al Hamra Group, Chengal Jati
Official Sponsors: Yakult, Moccis Furniture, Puspamara, Sinar Harian, Ekspres Mutiara, Glow Glowing
Gym Partner: PakaQ Gomo Gym

Home	Away	GK Home	GK Away

== Competitions ==
=== Overview ===
Competition	Record								Started round	Current position / round	Final position / round	First match	Last match
Competition	P	W	D	L	GF	GA	GD	Win %	Started round	Current position / round	Final position / round	First match	Last match
Liga Super	22	7	4	11	31	39	−8	31.82	—	10th	10th	21 January	28 October
Piala FA	1	0	1	0	1	1	+0	0.00	Second round	Second round	Second round	14 February	14 February
Piala Malaysia	6	2	0	4	8	12	−4	33.33	Group Stage	Group Stage	Group Stage	5 July	9 September
Total	29	9	5	15	40	52	−12	31.03					

Updated to match played 28 October 2017
Source: Competitions

== Results and fixtures ==
Win Draw Loss Postponed Upcoming fixture

=== Pre-season and friendlies ===
28 December 2016 Friendly	Terengganu	0−0	Kelantan	Kuala Terengganu, Terengganu
		Report		Stadium: Sultan Mizan Zainal Abidin Stadium

7 January 2017 Friendly	Kelantan	4−2	(Kelantan) Gua Musang	Kota Bharu, Kelantan
	Khairul Izuan 0', 0'; Hasmizan 0'; Zairul 0'	Report	Unknown 0'; Unknown 0'	Stadium: Padang Mardi

9 January 2017 Friendly	MIFA (Malaysia)	2−0	Kelantan	Nilai, Negeri Sembilan
	Bodric 60', 63'	Report		Stadium: Padang USIM

11 January 2017 Friendly	UiTM (Selangor)	0−2	Kelantan	Subang Jaya, Selangor
		Report	Danial 3'; Hattaphon 40'	Stadium: MPSJ Stadium

13 January 2017 Friendly	PDRM	5−0	Kelantan	Kuala Lumpur, Wilayah Persekutuan
		Report		Stadium: Padang PULAPOL

3 February 2017 Friendly	Kelantan	4−0	(Terengganu) Hanelang	Kota Bharu, Kelantan
17:00 UTC+8	Celin 17' (substituted off) 70'; Gomis (substituted off) 40'; Indra Putra (substituted on) 40'; S. Thinagaran (substituted off) 40'; Hattaphon (substituted off) 40'; Ghaddar (substituted on) 40'; Nik Shahrul (substituted off) 46'; Khairul Izuan (substituted on) 46'; Norhafiz (substituted off) 46'; Daudsu (substituted on) 46'; Shahrizan (substituted off) 46'; Khairul Fahmi (substituted on) 46'; Nor Farhan (substituted on) 40' (goal) 57', 79'; Zairul (substituted off) 70'; Azwan (substituted on) 70'; Badhri (substituted off) 70'; Aziz (substituted on) 70'; Danso (substituted off) 70'; Faizol (substituted on) 70'; Fakhrul (substituted on) 70'; Rozaimi 90+2'	HT 1−0; Report		Stadium: Sultan Muhammad IV Stadium; Referee: Mohd Asrol Mohd Amir; Assistant 1: Mohd Faisal Ridhuan; Assistant 2: Tuan Ahmad Razlan; Fourth official: Al Hafiz Husain

18 March 2017 Friendly	Kelantan	1−1	Terengganu	Kota Bharu, Kelantan
20:45 UTC+8	Khairul Izuan 17'	HT 1−0; Report	Faiz Nasir 48'	Stadium: Sultan Muhammad IV Stadium

22 March 2017 Friendly	PDRM	1−2	Kelantan	Kuala Lumpur, Wilayah Persekutuan
17:15 UTC+8	Bakary 31' (pen.)	Report	Fakhrul 20'; Badhri 89'	Stadium: Padang PULAPOL

24 March 2017 Friendly	Kuala Lumpur	3−2	Kelantan	Bangi, Selangor
17:15 UTC+8	? 12'		Hasmizan 27'; Khairul Izuan 41'	Stadium: UKM Bangi Stadium

13 May 2017 Friendly	PKNS (Selangor)	0−2	Kelantan	Shah Alam, Selangor
21:00 UTC+8		HT 0–2; Report	Alessandro Celin (pen.); Indra 38' (substituted off) 41'; Danial Ashraf (substituted on) 41'; S. Subramaniam (yellow card) 66'; Sanna Nyassi (substituted off) 81'; Fakhrul Zaman (substituted on) 81'; Morgaro Gomis (substituted off) 86'; Khairul Izuan (substituted on) 86'	Stadium: Shah Alam Stadium

17 June 2017 Friendly	Kelantan	5−0	(Kelantan) MPKB BRI	Kota Bharu, Kelantan
22:00 UTC+8	L´Imam Seydi 12'; Abou Bakr 14', 64'; Hattaphon 19'; Nik Azli (U21) 87'	HT 0–3; Report		Stadium: Perdana Field

21 June 2017 Friendly	Terengganu	0−1	Kelantan	Kuala Terengganu, Terengganu
22:00 UTC+8		HT 0–0; Report	Alessandro Celin (substituted off) 63'; L´Imam Seydi (substituted on) 63' (goal) (pen.), 80'; Abou Bakr (substituted off) 76'; Khairul Izuan (substituted on) 76'	Stadium: Sultan Ismail Nasiruddin Shah Stadium

14 August 2017 Friendly	Kelantan (Malaysia)	3−0	(Thailand) Royal Thai Army	Kota Bharu, Kelantan
21:00 UTC+8	Seydi 12'; Danso 53' (pen.); Zairul 55'			Stadium: Sultan Muhammad IV Stadium

24 August 2017 Friendly	Terengganu City	2−1	Kelantan	Kuala Nerus, Terengganu
16:45 UTC+8			Seydi 48'	Stadium: Sultan Mizan Zainal Abidin Stadium

12 October 2017 Friendly	Kelantan (Malaysia)	8−1	(Thailand) KN Sport Kolok FC	Kota Bharu, Kelantan
16:45 UTC+8	Seydi 5', 15', 0'; Imran; Bako; Celin 0', 0'; Indra Putra			Stadium: Sultan Muhammad IV Stadium

16 October 2017 Friendly	Kelantan	3−1	(Kelantan) LBR Rantau Panjang	Kota Bharu, Kelantan
16:45 UTC+8	Nik Azli 0', 0'; Khairul Izuan			Stadium: Sultan Muhammad IV Stadium

23 October 2017 Friendly	Kelantan	2−3	Terengganu	Kota Bharu, Kelantan
20:45 UTC+8	Bako 12'; Indra Putra 26'		Kipré 53'; Ismail 60'; Sharin 89'	Stadium: Sultan Muhammad IV Stadium

=== Liga Super ===
21 February 2017 #1 (3) (Note: Match #1 (3) against Melaka United was postponed due to waterlogged pitch.)	Kelantan	0−2	(Malacca) Melaka United	Kota Bharu, Kelantan
21:00 UTC+8	Daudsu (substituted off) 19'; Nor Farhan (substituted on) 19'; Badhri (substituted off) 71'; Fakhrul (substituted on) 71'; Gomis (yellow card) 74'; Khairul Izuan (substituted off) 86'; Hakim (substituted on) 86'	HT 0−0; Report	Spasojević 59' (substituted off) 86'; Amri (substituted off) 65'; Khuzaimi (substituted on) 65'; Faizal (substituted off) 75'; Sobri (substituted on) 75'; Fauzi (substituted on) 86' (goal) 90+2'	Stadium: Sultan Muhammad IV Stadium; Attendance: 8,963; Referee: Razlan Jeffri Ali; Assistant 1: Azman Ismail; Assistant 2: Nordin Mat Jusoh; Fourth official: Ku Alaudin

27 January 2017 #2 (11)	PKNS (Selangor)	1−3	Kelantan	Shah Alam, Selangor
16:45 UTC+8	Affize (substituted off) 18'; Alif (substituted on) 18' (substituted off) 85'; Azmi (yellow card) 21'; Soto 45+2'; Sivanesan (substituted off) 54'; Khyril (substituted on) 54'; Khairul (substituted on) 85'	HT 1−2; Report	Ghaddar 20', 22' (pen.); Badhri 49'; Gomis (yellow card) 63'; Nor Farhan (substituted off) 66'; Thinagaran (substituted on) 66'; Danso (yellow card) 77'; Indra Putra (substituted off) 89'; Hattaphon (substituted on) 89'	Stadium: Shah Alam Stadium; Attendance: 6,080; Referee: Khairul Azuan Kidam; Assistant 1: Azizul Hakim; Assistant 2: Mohd Junaidy Samad; Fourth official: Logeswaran

12 April 2017 #3 (14) (Note: Match #3 (14) was postponed due to a tight schedule following JDT's qualification for the AFC Champions League play-off round.)	Kelantan	2−3	Johor Darul Ta'zim	Kota Bharu, Kelantan
21:00 UTC+8	Ghaddar 5', 15'; Khairul Izuan (substituted off) 59'; Hattaphon (substituted on) 59'; Gomis (yellow card) 63'; Qayyum (red card) 76'; Indra Putra (yellow card) 82'; Badhri (substituted off) 84'; Fakhrul (substituted on) 84'	HT 2−3; Report	Safiq 20' (substituted off) 86'; Guerra 29' (pen.); Cabrera 30'; Amirul (yellow card) 45'; Kunanlan (substituted off) 46'; Fazly (substituted on) 46'; Gopinathan (substituted off) 54'; Azamuddin (substituted on) 54'; Zafuan (substituted on) 86'	Stadium: Sultan Muhammad IV Stadium; Attendance: 13,891; Referee: Muhd Nazmi Nasaruddin; Assistant 1: Azman Ismail; Assistant 2: Asrul Zairi; Fourth official: Ku Alaudin

11 February 2017 #4 (24)	FELDA United (Kuala Lumpur)	1−2	Kelantan	Jengka, Pahang
21:00 UTC+8	Zah Rahan 45+2' (yellow card) 90+2'; Cellerino (substituted off) 69'; Fakrul (substituted on) 69'; Hadin (substituted off) 82'; Cano (substituted on) 82'; Alif (substituted off) 90'; Aizulridzwan (substituted on) 90'	HT 1−1; Report	Indra Putra 34'; Badhri (substituted off) 45+1'; Norhafiz (substituted on) 45+1'; Farisham (yellow card) 56'; Zairul (substituted off) 58'; Hattaphon (substituted on) 58'; Celin (substituted off) 79'; Nor Farhan (substituted on) 79'; Ghaddar 90'; Danso (yellow card) 90+2'	Stadium: Tun Abdul Razak Stadium; Attendance: 10,393; Referee: Zamzaidi Katimin; Assistant 1: Mohd Hariff Akhir; Assistant 2: Mohd Abdul Suki; Fourth official: Almi Abdullah

18 February 2017 #5 (26)	Kelantan	0−1	Kedah	Kota Bharu, Kelantan
21:00 UTC+8	Celin (substituted off) 12'; Danial (substituted on) 12' (yellow card) 84'; Daudsu (substituted off) 54'; Hattaphon (substituted on) 54'; Nor Farhan (substituted off) 73'; Norhafiz (substituted on) 73'	HT 0−0; Report	Farhan (substituted off) 18'; Halim (substituted on) 18'; Akram (yellow card) 37'; Amirul (substituted off) 71'; Syafiq (substituted on) 71'; Baddrol 82' (pen.); Fakri (substituted off) 86'; Hanif (substituted on) 86'	Stadium: Sultan Muhammad IV Stadium; Attendance: 20,853; Referee: Suhaimi Mat Hassan; Assistant 1: Ismadi Ibrahim; Assistant 2: Azmi Khalid; Fourth official: Mohd Asrol Mohd Amir

25 February 2017 #6 (36)	Kelantan	0−2	Selangor	Kota Bharu, Kelantan
21:00 UTC+8	Hasmizan (substituted off) 46'; Badhri (substituted on) 46'; Indra Putra (substituted off) 67'; Fakhrul (substituted on) 67'; Khairul Izuan (substituted off) 73'; Hattaphon (substituted on) 73'	HT 0−1; Report	Mineiro 4', 63' (substituted off) 78'; Syahmi (yellow card) 19'; Doe (substituted off) 20'; Adam Nor (substituted on) 20' (yellow card) 44'; Fitri Shazwan (substituted on) 78'; Halim (substituted off) 86'; Bunyamin (substituted on) 86'	Stadium: Sultan Muhammad IV Stadium; Attendance: 2,503; Referee: Zulkifli Ahmad; Assistant 1: Mohd Arif Shamil Abd Rasid; Assistant 2: Mohd Zulkiflin; Fourth official: Mohd Hasrol Amir

1 March 2017 #7 (39)	Perak	2−4	Kelantan	Ipoh, Perak
21:00 UTC+8	Mirchev 18', 90+2'; Amirul (yellow card) 25'; Nazrin (substituted off) 69'; Hadi (substituted on) 69'; Nasir (substituted off) 76'; Toski (substituted on) 76'; Adha (yellow card) 90+1'	HT 1−1; Report	Ghaddar 38', 83', 88' (pen.) (substituted off) 90+5'; Zairul (substituted off) 65'; Thinagaran (substituted on) 65' (yellow card) 90+1'; Khairul Izuan (substituted off) 84'; Danial (substituted on) 84'; Indra Putra 90+3'; Faizol (substituted on) 90+5'	Stadium: Perak Stadium; Attendance: 5,570; Referee: Mohd Nafeez Abd Wahab; Assistant 1: Mohd Arif Shamil Abd Rasid; Assistant 2: Muhammad Juhairi Idris; Fourth official: Rafifi Anuar Abdullah

4 March 2017 #8 (46)	Kelantan	4−2	(Terengganu) T-Team	Kota Bharu, Kelantan
21:00 UTC+8	Ghaddar 7', 69', 83'; Zairul (substituted off) 49'; Khairul Izuan (substituted on) 49' (goal) 76'; Fakhrul (substituted off) 61'; Danial (substituted on) 61'; Gomis (yellow card) 72'; Qayyum (substituted off) 90+2'; Aziz (substituted on) 90+2'	HT 1−0; Report	Nor Hakim 46' (substituted off) 78'; Abdullah (substituted off) 58'; Shakir (substituted on) 58'; Azrean (substituted on) 78'; Badrul (substituted off) 87'; Azalinullah (substituted on) 87'; Tadjiyev 90'	Stadium: Sultan Muhammad IV Stadium; Attendance: 10,653; Referee: Fitri Maskon; Assistant 1: Azmi Ismail; Assistant 2: Muhammad Juhairi Idris; Fourth official: Tuan Ahmad Razlan

26 April 2017 #9 (51) (Note: Match #9 (51) was rescheduled due to Malaysia national team preparation for AFC Asian Cup qualification against North Korea national football team and international Friendly match against Philippines national football team.)	Sarawak	0−0	Kelantan	Kuching, Sarawak
20:15 UTC+8	Shreen (substituted off) 59'; Hartmann (substituted on) 59'; Rahim (substituted off) 81'; Hafiz (substituted on) 81'	HT 0−0; Report	Norhafiz (substituted off) 55'; Qayyum (substituted on) 55'; Aziz (yellow card) 67' (substituted off) 79'; Faizol (substituted off) 72'; Subramaniam (substituted on) 72'; Khairul Izuan (substituted on) 79'	Stadium: Sarawak State Stadium; Attendance: 1,596; Referee: Zulkarnain Zakaria; Assistant 1: Mohd Hariff Akhir; Assistant 2: Marzuki Mohd Johari; Fourth official: Khalid Fauzan

8 April 2017 #10 (56)	Kelantan	1−2	Pahang	Kota Bharu, Kelantan
21:00 UTC+8	Ghaddar 16'; Indra Putra (yellow card) 28'; Khairul Izuan (substituted off) 56'; Danial (substituted on) 56'; Nik Shahrul (substituted off) 69'; Faizol (substituted on) 69'; Norhafiz (substituted off) 78'; Fakhrul (substituted on) 78'	HT 1−0; Report	Afif (yellow card) 32'; Davies (yellow card) 54'; Muslim (yellow card) 57' (substituted off) 89'; Wan Zaharulnizam 60' (substituted off) 86'; Alves 62'; Salomon (substituted off) 68'; Ashari (substituted on) 68'; Joseph (substituted on) 86'; Saiful (substituted on) 89'	Stadium: Sultan Muhammad IV Stadium; Attendance: 3,373; Referee: Mohd Nafeez Abd Wahab; Assistant 1: Muhammad Juhairi Idris; Assistant 2: Ahmad Faizal Mamat; Fourth official: Mohd Hasrol Amir

15 April 2017 #11 (64)	Penang	1−5	Kelantan	Batu Kawan, Penang
21:00 UTC+8	Rafiuddin (yellow card) 18'; Syukur 35' (substituted off) 76'; Syamer (substituted off) 63'; Faiz (substituted on) 63'; Reinaldo (substituted off) 67'; Redzuan (substituted on) 67'; Faizat (substituted on) 76' (yellow card) 76'	HT 1–2; Report	Ghaddar 19' (pen.), 22', 25', 57', 78'; Badhri (yellow card) 45+2'; Rozaimi (substituted off) 72'; Khairul Izuan (substituted on) 72'; Farisham (substituted off) 82'; Faizol (substituted on) 82'; Indra Putra (substituted off) 85'; Subramaniam (substituted on) 85'; Danial 90'	Stadium: Penang State Stadium; Attendance: 8,130; Referee: Zulkarnain Zakaria; Assistant 1: Mohd Shahreen Che Omar; Assistant 2: Mohd Fazli; Fourth official: Muhammad Azwan

24 May 2017 #12 (70) (Note: Match #12 (70) was rescheduled due to Malaysia national team preparation for AFC Asian Cup qualification against North Korea national football team and international Friendly match against Philippines national football team.)	Kelantan	2–2	Penang	Kota Bharu, Kelantan
21:00 UTC+8	Thinagaran 27' (substituted off) 30'; Danial 55' (substituted on) 30'; Badhri (substituted off) 76'; Nor Farhan (substituted on) 76'; Celin (yellow card) 84'	HT 1–1; Report	Nyassi 24', 89'; Faiz (substituted off) 46'; Azidan (substituted on) 46'; Mahathevan (substituted off) 67'; Akmal (substituted on) 67'; Azrul (substituted off) 77'; Surendran (substituted off) 77'; Zulkhairi (yellow card) 79'; Reuben (yellow card) 90+4'	Stadium: Sultan Muhammad IV Stadium; Attendance: 8,924; Referee: Mohd Amirul Izwan Yaacob

6 May 2017 #13 (75)	Pahang	2−3	Kelantan	Kuantan, Pahang
21:00 UTC+8	Azam (substituted off) 46'; Insa (substituted on) 46' (yellow card) 58'; Nurridzuan (substituted off) 64'; Dike (substituted on) 64'; Alves 70', 78'; Wan Zaharulnizam (substituted off) 89'; Ashari (substituted on) 89'	HT 0–1; Report	Celin 18'; Gomis (yellow card) 60'; Khairul Izuan (substituted off) 58'; Danial (substituted on) 58'; Ghaddar 73', 79' (substituted off) 90+4'; Qayyum (substituted off) 90+1'; Nik Shahrul (substituted on) 90+1'; Subramaniam (substituted on) 90+4'	Stadium: Darul Makmur Stadium; Attendance: 11,267; Referee: Nagor Amir Noor Mohamed; Assistant 1: Mohd Khalid Mohd Aris; Assistant 2: Ismadi Ibrahim; Fourth official: Mat Zan Abd Wahab

1 July 2017 #14 (82)	Kelantan	0−2	Sarawak	Kota Bharu, Kelantan
21:00 UTC+8	Aziz (substituted off) 13'; Danial (substituted on) 13'; Subramaniam (yellow card) 56'; Bako (substituted off) 64'; Nik Azli (substituted on) 64'; Rozaimi (substituted off) 78'; Nor Farhan (substituted on) 78'	HT 0–2; Report	Demerson 22'; Roskam 35'; Kamaruddin (substituted off) 68'; Alif (substituted on) 68'; Rahim (substituted off) 80'; Shamie (substituted on) 80' (yellow card) 86'; Sahil (substituted off) 89'; Akwensivie (substituted on) 89'	Stadium: Sultan Muhammad IV Stadium; Attendance: 1,251; Referee: Fitri Maskon; Assistant 1: Azman Ismail; Assistant 2: Mohd Shahril Abu Samam; Fourth official: Mohd Hasrol Amir

11 July 2017 #15 (89)	T-Team (Terengganu)	3−1	Kelantan	Kuala Terengganu, Terengganu
21:00 UTC+8	Samassa (substituted off) 18'; Fauzi (substituted on) 18' (goal) 84'; Maïga (yellow card) 27'; Asrol (substituted off) 62'; Syed Sobri (substituted on) 62'; Ooi Shee Keong (substituted off) 80'; Amirzafran (substituted on) 80'; Sharofetdinov 80'; N'Djeng 87'	HT 0–0; Report	Farisham (substituted off) 45'; Hasmizan (substituted on) 45'; Khairul Izuan 63'; Bako (substituted off) 65'; Celin (substituted on) 65'; Rozaimi (substituted off) 75'; Fadhilah (substituted on) 75'	Stadium: Sultan Ismail Nasiruddin Shah Stadium; Attendance: 1,262; Referee: Nagor Amir Noor Mohamed; Assistant 1: Mohd Yusri Mohamad; Assistant 2: Mohd Salleh Yacob; Fourth official: Sukri Abdul Rahman

15 July 2017 #16 (92)	Kelantan	0−2	Perak	Kota Bharu, Kelantan
21:00 UTC+8	Nor Farhan (yellow card) 35' (substituted off) 74'; Qayyum (substituted off) 61'; Rozaimi (substituted on) 61'; Bako (substituted on) 74'; Khairul Izuan (substituted off) 87'; Nik Azli (substituted on) 87'	HT 0–1; Report	Nazrin 29' (substituted off) 90+1'; Gilmar (yellow card) 48'; Pinto (yellow card) 67' (goal) 80'; Shahrul (substituted off) 72'; Kenny (substituted on) 72'; Jasazrin (substituted on) 90+1'; Leandro (substituted off) 90+4'; Idris (substituted on) 90+4'	Stadium: Sultan Muhammad IV Stadium; Attendance: 1,523; Referee: Suhaimi Mat Hassan; Assistant 1: Azman Ismail; Assistant 2: Mohammad Juhairi; Fourth official: Tuan Ahmad Razlan

22 July 2017 #17 (102)	Selangor	1−0	Kelantan	Selayang, Selangor
21:00 UTC+8	Fairuz (substituted off) 17'; Rizal (substituted on) 17' (yellow card) 89'; Amri 20'; Veenod (substituted off) 62'; Andik (substituted on) 62'; Raimi (yellow card) 65'; Halim (substituted off) 83'; Bunyamin (substituted on) 83' (yellow card) 90+3'	HT 1–0; Report	Celin (substituted off) 61'; Nik Azli (substituted on) 61'; Fadhilah (yellow card) 67'; Khairul Izuan (substituted off) 78'; Nor Farhan (substituted on) 78'; Bako (yellow card) 89'	Stadium: Selayang Stadium; Attendance: 7,837; Referee: Khairul Azuan Kidam; Assistant 1: Wan Salman Wan Yusoff; Assistant 2: Ahmad Faizal Mamat; Fourth official: P. Jeevanathan

26 July 2017 #18 (103)	Kedah	5−0	Kelantan	Alor Setar, Kedah
21:00 UTC+8	Ariff 8' (substituted off) 46'; Fitri (substituted on) 46' (yellow card) 90+1'; Ilsø 48', 60'; Anderson (substituted off) 63'; Syawal (substituted on) 63'; Syazwan Zainon (substituted off) 67'; Fakri (substituted on) 67'; Sandro 71', 87'; Khairul Helmi (yellow card) 85'	HT 1–0; Report	Fadhilah (yellow card) 41' (substituted off) 51'; Qayyum (yellow card) 45+1' (substituted off) 66'; Indra Putra (yellow card) 50'; Danial (substituted on) 51'; Aziz (substituted on) 66'; Farisham (substituted off) 75'; Hattaphon (substituted on) 75' (yellow card) 90+1'	Stadium: Darul Aman Stadium; Attendance: 11,970; Referee: Zamzaidi Katimin; Assistant 1: Mohammad Juhairi Haji Idris; Assistant 2: Ahmad Azanor Huslan; Fourth official: Mohd Izzat Izaini Ali

5 August 2017 #19 (114)	Kelantan	1−1	(Kuala Lumpur) FELDA United	Kota Bharu, Kelantan
21:00 UTC+8	Fadhilah (yellow card) 20'; Celin 26'; Subramaniam (substituted off) 46'; Norhafiz (substituted on) 46'; Daudsu (yellow card) 56'	HT 1–1; Report	Olusegun 25'; Wan Zack (substituted off) 67'; Azriddin (substituted on) 67'; Wark (substituted off) 82'; Safwan (substituted on) 82'; Zah Rahan (substituted off) 90'; Fazrul (substituted on) 90'; Djulbic (yellow card) 90+1'	Stadium: Sultan Muhammad IV Stadium; Attendance: 1,061; Referee: Fitri Maskon

20 September 2017 #20 (116)	Johor Darul Ta'zim	3−0	Kelantan	Johor Bahru, Johor
21:00 UTC+8	Kunanlan 20'; Cabrera 38' (yellow card) 67'; Izham (substituted off) 46'; Haziq (substituted on) 46'; Safiq 56'; Guerra (substituted off) 65'; Safawi (substituted on) 65'; Fadhli (substituted off) 70'; Aidil (substituted on) 70'	HT 2–0; Report	Qayyum (yellow card) 40'; Thinagaran (substituted off) 51'; Badhri Radzi (substituted on) 51'; Celin (substituted off) 62'; Farhan (substituted on) 62'; Daudsu (substituted off) 89'; Hattaphon (substituted on) 89'	Stadium: Tan Sri Dato Haji Hassan Yunos Stadium; Attendance: 18,210; Referee: Razlan Jeffri Ali

30 September 2017 #21 (125)	Kelantan	0−0	(Selangor) PKNS	Kota Bharu, Kelantan
21:00 UTC+8	Bako (substituted off) 57'; Nor Farhan (substituted on) 57'; Faizol (substituted off) 72'; Hasmizan (substituted on) 72'; Daudsu (substituted off) 77'; Celin (substituted on) 77'	HT 0−0; Report	Wleh (substituted off) 61'; Alif (substituted on) 61'; Ferreira (substituted off) 71'; Azrin (substituted on) 71'; Safee (substituted off) 86'; Azmizi (substituted on) 86'	Stadium: Sultan Muhammad IV Stadium; Attendance: 5,076; Referee: Muhd Nazmi Nasaruddin

28 October 2017 #22 (129)	Melaka United (Malacca)	1−3	Kelantan	Krubong, Melaka
21:00 UTC+8	Swirad 30'; Šimić (yellow card) 42'; Sivanesan (substituted off) 61'; Ezrie (substituted on) 61'; Surendran (substituted off) 77'; Norhakim (substituted on) 77'; Fauzi (substituted off) 82'; Jasmir (substituted on) 82'	HT 1−0; Report	Bako 75' (substituted off) 90+2'; Fadhilah (substituted off) 77'; Celin (substituted on) 77' (goal) 81', 88'; Nik Azli (substituted on) 90+2'	Stadium: Hang Jebat Stadium; Attendance: 4,723; Referee: Wan Mohd Tarmizi Wan Ibrahim

Source: Fixtures / Result

=== Postponed matches ===
Match no.	Competitions	Original date	New date	Against	Stadium	Location
#1 (3)	Liga Super	21 January 2017	21 February 2017	(Malacca) Melaka United	Sultan Muhammad IV Stadium	Kota Bharu, Kelantan
#3 (14)	Liga Super	4 February 2017	12 April 2017	Johor Darul Ta'zim	Sultan Muhammad IV Stadium	Kota Bharu, Kelantan
#9 (51)	Liga Super	18 March 2017	26 April 2017	Sarawak	Sarawak State Stadium	Kuching, Sarawak
#12 (70)	Liga Super	26 April 2017	24 May 2017	Penang	Sultan Muhammad IV Stadium	Kota Bharu, Kelantan

==== Results by matchday ====
Matchday	1	2	3	4	5	6	7	8	9	10	11	12	13	14	15	16	17	18	19	20	21	22
Ground	H	A	H	A	H	H	A	H	A	H	A	H	A	H	A	H	A	A	H	A	H	A
Result	L	W	L	W	L	L	W	W	D	L	W	D	W	L	L	L	L	L	D	L	D	W
Position	8	6	6	5	7	10	6	6	5	6	6	7	8 (Note: Kelantan were 7th but dropped to 8th after T-Team were given back 3 point from their 6-point reduction.)	7	8	8	9	9	9	10	11	10

Updated to match(es) played on 28 October 2017. Source: Liga Super results
A = Away; H = Home; W = Win; D = Draw; L = Loss

==== Results summary ====
Overall								Home						Away					
Pld	W	D	L	GF	GA	GD	Pts	W	D	L	GF	GA	GD	W	D	L	GF	GA	GD
22	7	4	11	31	39	−8	25	1	3	7	10	19	−9	6	1	4	21	20	+1

Last updated: 29 October 2017.
Source: Liga Super results

=== League table ===
Pos	Team	Pld	W	D	L	GF	GA	GD	Pts	Qualification or relegation
8	Melaka United	22	6	6	10	33	46	−13	24	
9	T–Team (R)	22	7	5	10	30	45	−15	23 (Note: Kelantan and T–Team was sentenced to a six-point deduction immediately on offense failed to complete the registration process Malaysian League (M-League) 2017. Later, upon careful consideration of the aforementioned appeals, Football Malaysia have decided to lift the transfer ban and reduce the deduction of 6 points to 3 points for T-Team.)	Relegation to Premier League
10	Kelantan	22	7	4	11	31	39	−8	22 (Note: Kelantan and T–Team was sentenced to a six-point deduction immediately on offense failed to complete the registration process Malaysian League (M-League) 2017. Later, upon careful consideration of the aforementioned appeals, Football Malaysia have decided to only reduce the deduction of 6 points to 3 points for Kelantan.)	
11	Sarawak (R)	22	5	6	11	24	34	−10	21	Relegation to Premier League
12	Penang (R)	22	3	3	16	16	43	−27	12	Relegation to Premier League

Source: FAM, FMLLP
Rules for classification: 1) Points; 2) Goal difference; 3) Number of goals scored.
(R) Relegated

=== Piala FA ===
14 February 2017 Second round	PKNP (Perak)	1−1 (a.e.t.) (4–3 p)	Kelantan	Ipoh, Perak
21:00 UTC+8	G. Mugenthiran 10' (yellow card) 120+2'; Sukri (yellow card) 21' (substituted off) 92'; Shahrel (yellow card) 56'; Norhizwan (substituted off) 62'; Faizzwan (substituted on) 62'; Weijl (substituted off) 71'; Deevan (substituted on) 71'; Asyraaf (yellow card) 88'; Fazli (yellow card) 90+5'; Amirul (substituted on) 92'	HT 1−0; Report	Daudsu (yellow card) 26'; Nor Farhan (yellow card) 37' (substituted off) 85'; Aziz (substituted off) 56'; Farisham (substituted on) 56'; Indra Putra 63'; Fakhrul (substituted on) 85'; Qayyum (substituted off) 100'; Zairul (substituted on) 100'	Stadium: Perak Stadium; Attendance: 3,220; Referee: Muhd Rahmat Jantan; Assistant 1: Mohd Khairul Nizam Radzali; Assistant 2: Azmi Khalid; Fourth official: Rafifi Anuar Abdullah
	Penalties
	G.Mugenthiran (penalty missed); Krjauklis (penalty scored); Fadhil (penalty missed); Faizzwan (penalty scored); Gilberto (penalty scored); Deevan (penalty scored)		Celin (penalty scored); Danso (penalty scored); Gomis (penalty missed); Indra (penalty scored); Ghaddar (penalty missed); Daudsu (penalty missed)

=== Piala Malaysia ===
==== Group stage ====
Pos	Team	Pld	W	D	L	GF	GA	GD	Pts	Qualification	KDH	MLK	KLT	UITM
1	Kedah	6	5	0	1	17	5	+12	15	Advance to knockout phase	—	2–0	2–0	1–0
2	(Malacca) Melaka United	6	3	0	3	13	16	−3	9	Advance to knockout phase	2–6	—	3–0	2–1
3	Kelantan	6	2	0	4	8	12	−4	6		3–1	2–3	—	3–1
4	(Selangor) UiTM	6	2	0	4	9	14	−5	6		0–5	5–3	2–0	—

Updated to match(es) played on 9 September 2017. Source: FAM FMLLP

5 July 2017 Group Stage	Kelantan	3−1	(Selangor) UiTM	Kota Bharu, Kelantan
21:00 UTC+8	Khairul Izuan 41', 63' (substituted off) 83'; Gomis (substituted off) 51'; Nor Farhan (substituted on) 51'; Qayyum (yellow card) 52'; Danial (substituted off) 53'; Celin (substituted on) 53' (yellow card) 90+2'; Nik Azli (substituted on) 83'; Bako 90+3'	HT 1−0; Report	Asnan (substituted off) 46'; Wasiu 52'; Raslam (substituted on) 46' (substituted off) 74'; Syed Ariff (substituted off) 66'; Ridzuan (substituted on) 66'; Zulkifli (substituted on) 74'	Stadium: Sultan Muhammad IV Stadium; Attendance: 1,633; Referee: Mohd Fairuzi Mat Desa

8 July 2017 Group Stage	Melaka United (Malacca)	3−0	Kelantan	Krubong, Melaka
21:00 UTC+8	Šimić 21'; Norhakim (yellow card) 24' (substituted off) 57'; Surendran 30' (substituted off) 65'; Fauzi 49'; Sivanesan (substituted on) 57'; Fandi (substituted on) 65'; Felipe (substituted off) 77'; Jasmir (substituted on) 77'	HT 2−0; Report	Bako (substituted off) 54'; Danial Ashraf (substituted on) 54'; Badhri (substituted off) 67'; Rozaimi (substituted on) 67'; Celin (substituted off) 74'; Nor Farhan (substituted on) 74'	Stadium: Hang Jebat Stadium; Attendance: 5,529; Referee: Khairul Azuan Kidam

18 July 2017 Group Stage	Kelantan	3−1	Kedah	Kota Bharu, Kelantan
21:00 UTC+8	Gomis 54'; Fadhilah (yellow card) 57' (substituted off) 84'; Bako 65', 90+3' (substituted off) 90+3'; Indra Putra (yellow card) 72'; Qayyum (yellow card) 83'; Nor Farhan (substituted on) 84'; Khairul Izuan (substituted off) 90+2'; Rozaimi (substituted on) 90+2'; Nik Azli (substituted on) 90+3'	HT 0−0; Report	Baddrol (substituted off) 55'; Farhan (substituted on) 55' (substituted off) 62'; Hanif (substituted on) 62'; Khairul Helmi (yellow card) 79'; Liridon 85' (pen.); Syazwan (substituted off) 85'; Fakri (substituted on) 85'	Stadium: Sultan Muhammad IV Stadium; Attendance: 2,357; Referee: Razlan Jeffri Ali

29 July 2017 Group Stage	UiTM (Selangor)	2−0	Kelantan	Shah Alam, Selangor
21:00 UTC+8	Sunday 7', 45+2'; Syahrizan (substituted off) 19'; Afiq (substituted on) 19'; Dong-hyun (yellow card) 51' (substituted off) 90+3'; Nursalam (substituted off) 73'; Sadam (substituted on) 73'; Asnan (substituted on) 90+3'	HT 2−0; Report	Celin (yellow card) 46' (substituted off) 85'; Rozaimi (substituted off) 46'; Qayyum (substituted on) 46'; Hattaphon (substituted off) 79'; Daudsu (substituted on) 79'; Nor Farhan (substituted on) 85'	Stadium: UiTM Stadium; Attendance: 1,700; Referee: Mohd Amirul Izwan Yaacob

2 August 2017 Group Stage	Kelantan	2−3	(Malacca) Melaka United	Kota Bharu, Kelantan
21:00 UTC+8	Subramaniam (yellow card) 24'; Indra Putra (yellow card) 35'; Aziz (substituted off) 36'; Danial (substituted on) 36'; Khairul Izuan 51'; Norhafiz (substituted off) 54'; Bako (substituted on) 54'; Nor Farhan (substituted off) 67'; Celin (substituted on) 67'; Danso 86'	HT 0−3; Report	Jeon 5', 31'; Surendran (yellow card) 29'; Šimić 33'; Badrulzaman (substituted off) 46'; Fazli (substituted on) 46'; Fauzi (substituted off) 62'; Azinee (substituted on) 62'; Ezrie (substituted off) 67'; Norhakim (substituted on) 67'	Stadium: Sultan Muhammad IV Stadium; Attendance: 2,699; Referee: Suhaimi Mat Hassan

9 September 2017 Group Stage	Kedah	2−0	Kelantan	Alor Setar, Kedah
21:00 UTC+8	Hanif (substituted off) 13'; Amirul (substituted on) 13'; Sandro 24'; Syafiq (substituted off) 71'; Farhan (substituted on) 71'; Syazuan (substituted off) 75'; Hidhir (substituted on) 75'; Ilsø 77'	Report	Aziz (substituted off) 17'; Zairul (substituted on) 17'; Faizol (yellow card) 65'; Hattaphon (substituted off) 66'; Subramaniam (substituted on) 66'; Nor Farhan (substituted off) 78'; Nik Azli (substituted on) 78'	Stadium: Darul Aman Stadium; Attendance: 10,000; Referee: Muhammad Nazmi Nasaruddin

== Squad information ==
=== List of players ===
No.	Name	Nationality	Position(s)	Date of Birth (Age)	Since	Signed from/Before Played for
Goalkeepers
1	Mohamad Ramadhan Abdul Hamid	(Malaysia)	GK	16 February 1994 (age 32)	2016	(Malaysia) Harimau Muda B
19	Khairul Fahmi Che Mat (vice-captain)	(Malaysia)	GK	7 January 1989 (age 37)	2009	(Malaysia) Harimau Muda
30	Mohd Shahrizan Ismail	(Malaysia)	GK	3 November 1980 (age 46)	2008	Terengganu
33	Ahmad Syihan Hazmi^{U21}	(Malaysia)	GK	22 February 1996 (age 30)	2016	Kelantan U21s
Centerbacks
2	Norhafiz Zamani Misbah	(Malaysia)	CB / DM	15 July 1981 (age 45)	2015	Negeri Sembilan
3	S. Subramaniam	(Malaysia)	CB / DM / RB	31 August 1985 (age 41)	2017	Selangor
11	Hasmizan Kamarodin	(Malaysia)	CB	24 January 1984 (age 42)	2017	Terengganu
12	Mamadou Danso^{FP} (vice-captain)	(The Gambia)	CB	27 April 1983 (age 43)	2017	(United States) Rayo OKC
26	Mohd Nasharizam Abd Rashid^{LO} (Note: Mohd Nasharizam Abd Rashid was loaned to Perlis FA until the end of the 2017 season.)	(Malaysia)	CB	4 January 1995 (age 31)	2016	Kelantan U21s
25	Mohd Faris Shah Rosli	(Malaysia)	CB / DM	17 April 1995 (age 31)	2016	Kelantan U21s
32	Mohamad Azwan Aripin^{U21}	(Malaysia)	CB	21 April 1996 (age 30)	2016	Kelantan U21s
Fullbacks
5	Nik Shahrul Azim^{LO} (Note: Nik Shahrul Azim was loaned to Negeri Sembilan FA for 6 months until the end of the 2017 season.)	(Malaysia)	RB / RWB / CB	30 December 1990 (age 35)	2011	Kelantan U21s
6	Mohd Farisham Ismail	(Malaysia)	RB / RWB / LB / LWB / CB	5 January 1985 (age 41)	2008	(Malacca) Melaka TMFC
7	Mohd Qayyum Marjoni Sabil	(Malaysia)	LB / LWB / LW	28 March 1994 (age 32)	2016	Kelantan U21s
13	Mohammad Abdul Aziz Ismail	(Malaysia)	LB	7 August 1988 (age 38)	2017	(Malacca) Melaka United
15	Mohd Daudsu Jamaluddin	(Malaysia)	RB / RWB / LB / RW	18 March 1985 (age 41)	2016	Johor Darul Ta'zim
24	Zairul Fitree Ishak	(Malaysia)	LB / LWB / LW	4 February 1985 (age 41)	2009	Kedah
Defensive midfielders
21	Morgaro Gomis^{FP}	(Senegal) (France)	DM	14 July 1985 (age 41)	2016	(Scotland) Heart of Midlothian
27	Faizol Nazlin Sayuti	(Malaysia)	CB / DM	27 October 1992 (age 34)	2014	Kelantan U21s
35	Muhamad Fadhilah Mohd Pauzi^{U21}	(Malaysia)	CM / DM	23 April 1996 (age 30)	2016	Kelantan U21s
Central Midfielders
4	Mohd Rozaimi Azwar	(Malaysia)	CM / CF	24 January 1993 (age 33)	2015	Kelantan U21s
8	Muhamad Shahrul Hakim Rahim^{LO} (Note: Muhd Shahrul Hakim Rahim was loaned to MISC-MIFA for 6 months until the end of the 2017 season.)	(Malaysia)	CM / RW	2 February 1995 (age 31)	2016	Kelantan U21s
16	Mohd Badhri Mohd Radzi (captain)	(Malaysia)	AM / CM	2 June 1982 (age 44)	2008	PDRM
Attacking midfielders
18	Mohd Khairul Izuan Rosli	(Malaysia)	AM / SS / CF / RW / LW	9 March 1991 (age 35)	2011	ATM
27	Mohd Syafiq Abd Rahman^{LO} (Note: Mohd Syafiq Abd Rahman was loaned to Perlis FA until the end of the 2017 season.)	(Malaysia)	RM	1 January 1995 (age 31)*	2016	Kelantan U21s
34	Muhammad Danial Ashraf^{U21}	(Malaysia)	AM / CF	8 January 1997 (age 29)	2016	Kelantan U21s
Wingers
10	Nor Farhan Muhammad	(Malaysia)	RW / LW / AM / CF / SS	19 December 1984 (age 41)	2015	Terengganu
14	S. Thinagaran	(Malaysia)	RW	5 January 1986 (age 40)	2017	(Selangor) PKNS
23	Indra Putra Mahayuddin (vice-captain)	(Malaysia)	AM / CF / LW / RW	2 September 1981 (age 45)	2016	(Kuala Lumpur) FELDA United
24	Amir Zikri Pauzi^{LO} (Note: Amir Zikri Pauzi was loaned to Perlis FA until the end of the 2017 season.)	(Malaysia)	LW	17 March 1994 (age 32)	2016	Kelantan U21s
Forwards
9	Abou Bakr Al-Mel^{FP}	(Lebanon)	CF	15 November 1992 (age 33)	2017	(Lebanon) Tripoli
17	Fakhrul Zaman^{LO} (Note: Fakhrul Zaman was loaned to MISC-MIFA for 6 months until the end of the 2017 season.)	(Malaysia)	CF	13 April 1994 (age 32)	2016	Kelantan U21s
20	Hattaphon Bun An	(Malaysia)	CF	5 May 1991 (age 35)	2017	Kuala Lumpur
29	Alessandro Celin^{FP}	(Brazil) (Italy)	CF	11 September 1989 (age 37)	2017	(Romania) Concordia Chiajna
36	Nik Azli Nik Alias^{U21}	(Malaysia)	CF / LW	26 January 1997 (age 29)	2017	Kelantan U21s

Remarks:
^{U21} These players registered as Under-21 players at Piala Presiden competitions.
^{FP} These players are considered as foreign players at Malaysia domestic football competitions.
^{LO} These players are currently loan out to other clubs.

=== Formations first XI ===

Starting line-up: 4-1-3-2 on 11 February 2017 vs FELDA United

Starting line-up: 4-4-2 on 27 January 2017 vs PKNS

Starting line-up: 4-1-3-2 on 18 February 2017 vs Kedah

Starting line-up: 4-1-3-2 on 21 February 2017 vs Melaka United

Starting line-up: 4-2-4 on 25 February 2017 vs Selangor

Starting line-up: 4-1-3-2 on 1 March 2017 vs Perak

Starting line-up: 4-1-3-2 on 4 March 2017 vs T-Team

Starting line-up: 3-5-2 on 8 April 2017 vs Pahang

Starting line-up: 4-1-3-2 on 12 April 2017 vs Johor

Starting line-up: 4-1-3-2 on 15 April 2017 vs Penang

Starting line-up: 4-1-2-1-2 on 26 April 2017 vs Sarawak

Starting line-up: 4-1-4-1- on 6 May 2017 vs Pahang

Starting line-up: 4-1-3-2- on 24 May 2017 vs Penang

== Squad statistics ==
Key: = Appearances, = Goals, M = Minutes played = Yellow card, (red card) = Red card
Player names in bold denotes player that left mid-season (loaned)
(number in bracket denotes the players plays as a substitute in a match)

**Number**	**Nation**	**Position**	**Name**	**Total**					**League**					**Piala FA**					**Piala Malaysia**				
**Number**	**Nation**	**Position**	**Name**		Goal	M	Yellow card	Red card		Goal	M	Yellow card	Red card		Goal	M	Yellow card	Red card		Goal	M	Yellow card	Red card
1	(Malaysia)	GK	Ramadhan Hamid	15	0	1350	0	0	10	0	900	0	0	0	0	0	0	0	5	0	450	0	0
19	(Malaysia)	GK	Khairul Fahmi Che Mat (vc)	13	0	1200	0	0	11	0	990	0	0	1	0	120	0	0	1	0	90	0	0
30	(Malaysia)	GK	Mohd Shahrizan Ismail	1	0	90	0	0	1	0	90	0	0	0	0	0	0	0	0	0	0	0	0
33	(Malaysia)	GK	Ahmad Syihan Hazmi	0	0	0	0	0	0	0	0	0	0	0	0	0	0	0	0	0	0	0	0
2	(Malaysia)	DF	Norhafiz Zamani Misbah	16(3)	0	1497	0	0	12(3)	0	1143	0	0	1	0	120	0	0	3	0	234	0	0
3	(Malaysia)	DF	S. Subramaniam	8(3)	0	632	2	0	4(3)	0	338	1	0	0	0	0	0	0	3(1)	0	294	1	0
6	(Malaysia)	DF	Mohd Farisham Ismail	19(1)	0	1706	1	0	16	0	1372	1	0	0(1)	0	64	0	0	3	0	270	0	0
7	(Malaysia)	DF	Mohd Qayyum	25(2)	0	2279	4	1	19(1)	0	1684	2	1	1	0	100	0	0	5(1)	0	495	2	0
11	(Malaysia)	DF	Hasmizan Kamarodin	2(2)	0	199	0	0	2(2)	0	199	0	0	0	0	0	0	0	0	0	0	0	0
12	(The Gambia)	DF	Mamadou Danso (vc)	29	1	2640	2	0	22	0	1980	2	0	1	0	120	0	0	6	1	540	0	0
13	(Malaysia)	DF	Abdul Aziz Ismail	8(2)	0	495	1	0	4(2)	0	296	1	0	1	0	56	0	0	3	0	143	0	0
15	(Malaysia)	DF	Mohd Daudsu Jamaluddin	7(1)	0	550	2	0	6	0	419	1	0	1	0	120	1	0	0(1)	0	11	0	0
24	(Malaysia)	DF	Zairul Fitree Ishak	3(2)	0	265	0	0	3	0	172	0	0	0(1)	0	20	0	0	0(1)	0	73	0	0
25	(Malaysia)	DF	Mohd Faris Shah Rosli	0	0	0	0	0	0	0	0	0	0	0	0	0	0	0	0	0	0	0	0
27	(Malaysia)	DF	Faizol Nazlin Sayuti	4(3)	0	353	1	0	3(3)	0	263	0	0	0	0	0	0	0	1	0	90	1	0
32	(Malaysia)	DF	Mohamad Azwan Aripin	1	0	90	0	0	1	0	90	0	0	0	0	0	0	0	0	0	0	0	0
4	(Malaysia)	MF	Mohd Rozaimi Azwar	8(3)	0	657	0	0	6(1)	0	497	0	0	0	0	0	0	0	2(2)	0	160	0	0
10	(Malaysia)	MF	Nor Farhan Muhammad	10(11)	0	1080	2	0	7(7)	0	783	1	0	1	0	85	1	0	2(4)	0	212	0	0
14	(Malaysia)	MF	S. Thinagaran	2(2)	1	130	1	0	2(2)	1	130	1	0	0	0	0	0	0	0	0	0	0	0
16	(Malaysia)	MF	Mohd Badhri Mohd Radzi (c)	16(2)	1	1416	1	0	14(2)	1	1259	1	0	0	0	0	0	0	2	0	157	0	0
18	(Malaysia)	MF	Mohd Khairul Izuan Rosli	19(3)	5	1634	0	0	13(3)	2	1105	0	0	0	0	0	0	0	6	3	533	0	0
21	(Senegal)	MF	Morgaro Gomis	27	1	2421	5	0	20	0	1800	5	0	1	0	120	0	0	6	1	501	0	0
23	(Malaysia)	MF	Indra Putra Mahayuddin (vc)	28	3	2521	5	0	21	2	1861	3	0	1	1	120	0	0	6	0	540	2	0
34	(Malaysia)	MF	Muhammad Danial Ashraf	5(10)	2	858	1	0	4(8)	2	715	1	0	0	0	0	0	0	1(2)	0	143	0	0
35	(Malaysia)	MF	Fadhilah Mohd Pauzi	5(1)	0	407	4	0	4(1)	0	323	3	0	0	0	0	0	0	1	0	84	1	0
9	(Lebanon)	FW	Abou Bakr Al-Mel	12(2)	4	1012	1	0	8(1)	1	652	1	0	0	0	0	0	0	4(1)	3	360	0	0
20	(Malaysia)	FW	Hattaphon Bun An	3(7)	0	368	1	0	0(7)	0	133	1	0	0	0	0	0	0	3	0	235	0	0
29	(Brazil)	FW	Alessandro Celin	14(5)	4	1201	2	0	10(3)	4	771	1	0	1	0	120	0	0	3(2)	0	310	1	0
36	(Malaysia)	FW	Nik Azli Nik Alias	0(8)	0	107	0	0	0(5)	0	86	0	0	0	0	0	0	0	0(3)	0	21	0	0
Players who are on loan/left Kelantan mid season:
5	(Malaysia)	DF	**Nik Shahrul Azim**	6(1)	0	520	0	0	6(1)	0	520	0	0	0	0	0	0	0	0	0	0	0	0
26	(Malaysia)	DF	**Mohd Nasharizam**	0	0	0	0	0	0	0	0	0	0	0	0	0	0	0	0	0	0	0	0
8	(Malaysia)	MF	**Muhd Shahrul Hakim Rahim**	1(1)	0	94	0	0	1(1)	0	94	0	0	0	0	0	0	0	0	0	0	0	0
24	(Malaysia)	MF	**Amir Zikri Pauzi**	0	0	0	0	0	0	0	0	0	0	0	0	0	0	0	0	0	0	0	0
27	(Malaysia)	MF	**Mohd Syafiq Abd Rahman**	0	0	0	0	0	0	0	0	0	0	0	0	0	0	0	0	0	0	0	0
17	(Malaysia)	FW	**Fakhrul Zaman**	1(5)	0	157	0	0	1(4)	0	157	0	0	0(1)	0	35	0	0	0	0	0	0	0
22	(Lebanon)	FW	**Mohammed Ghaddar**	12	18	1110	0	0	11	18	990	0	0	1	0	120	0	0	0	0	0	0	0

Statistics accurate as of 28 October 2017.

=== Goalscorers ===
Rnk	Pos	No.	Player	Liga Super	Piala FA	Piala Malaysia	Total
1	FW	22	(Lebanon) **Mohammed Ghaddar**	18	0	0	18
2	MF	18	(Malaysia) Mohd Khairul Izuan Rosli	2	0	3	5
3	MF	9	(Lebanon) Abou Bakr Al-Mel	1	0	3	4
3	FW	29	(Brazil) Alessandro Celin	4	0	0	4
5	MF	23	(Malaysia) Indra Putra Mahayuddin	2	1	0	3
6	FW	34	(Malaysia) Danial Ashraf	2	0	0	2
7	DF	12	(The Gambia) Mamadou Danso	0	0	1	1
7	MF	14	(Malaysia) S. Thinagaran	1	0	0	1
7	MF	16	(Malaysia) Mohd Badhri Mohd Radzi	1	0	0	1
7	MF	21	(Senegal) Morgaro Gomis	0	0	1	1
#	Own goals			0	0	0	0
**Totals**				**31**	**1**	**8**	40

Updated to match played 29 October 2017
Source: Competitions

=== Hat-tricks ===
No.	Player	Competition	Against	Result	Date	Location
22	(Lebanon) **Mohammed Ghaddar**	Liga Super	Perak	2—**4**	1 March 2017	Perak Stadium, Ipoh
22	(Lebanon) **Mohammed Ghaddar**	Liga Super	T-Team	**4**—2	4 March 2017	Sultan Muhammad IV Stadium, Kota Bharu
22	(Lebanon) **Mohammed Ghaddar**	Liga Super	Penang	1—**5** ^{4}	15 April 2017	Penang State Stadium, Penang

Note

^{4} Player scored 4 goals

=== Clean sheets ===
Rnk	No.	Player	Matches Played	Conceded	Liga Super	Piala FA	Piala Malaysia
1	1	(Malaysia) Ramadhan Hamid	15	26	1	0	0
2	19	(Malaysia) Khairul Fahmi Che Mat	12	19	1	0	0
2	30	(Malaysia) Mohd Shahrizan Ismail	1	5	0	0	0
**Totals**			**26**	**47**	**2**	**0**	**0**

Updated to match played 29 October 2017
Source: Competitions

=== Discipline ===
Rnk	No.	Player	Total			Liga Super			Piala FA			Piala Malaysia		
Rnk	No.	Player	Yellow card	(yellow card) (red card)	Red card	Yellow card	(yellow card) (red card)	Red card	Yellow card	(yellow card) (red card)	Red card	Yellow card	(yellow card) (red card)	Red card
1	8	(Malaysia) Mohd Qayyum Marjoni Sabil	4	0	1	2	0	1	0	0	0	2	0	0
2	21	(Senegal) Morgaro Gomis	5	0	0	5	0	0	0	0	0	0	0	0
2	23	(Malaysia) Indra Putra Mahayuddin	5	0	0	3	0	0	0	0	0	2	0	0
4	35	(Malaysia) Muhamad Fadhilah Mohd Pauzi	4	0	0	3	0	0	0	0	0	1	0	0
5	3	(Malaysia) S. Subramaniam	2	0	0	1	0	0	0	0	0	1	0	0
5	12	(The Gambia) Mamadou Danso	2	0	0	2	0	0	0	0	0	0	0	0
5	10	(Malaysia) Nor Farhan Muhammad	2	0	0	1	0	0	1	0	0	0	0	0
5	15	(Malaysia) Mohd Daudsu Jamaluddin	2	0	0	1	0	0	1	0	0	0	0	0
5	29	(Brazil) Alessandro Celin	2	0	0	1	0	0	0	0	0	1	0	0
10	6	(Malaysia) Mohd Farisham Ismail	1	0	0	1	0	0	0	0	0	0	0	0
10	14	(Malaysia) S. Thinagaran	1	0	0	1	0	0	0	0	0	0	0	0
10	34	(Malaysia) Muhammad Danial Ashraf	1	0	0	1	0	0	0	0	0	0	0	0
10	16	(Malaysia) Mohd Badhri	1	0	0	1	0	0	0	0	0	0	0	0
10	13	(Malaysia) Abdul Aziz Ismail	1	0	0	1	0	0	0	0	0	0	0	0
10	9	(Lebanon) Abou Bakr Al-Mel	1	0	0	1	0	0	0	0	0	0	0	0
10	20	(Malaysia) Hattaphon Bun An	1	0	0	1	0	0	0	0	0	0	0	0
10	27	(Malaysia) Faizol Nazlin Sayuti	1	0	0	1	0	0	0	0	0	1	0	0
Totals			34	0	1	24	0	1	2	0	0	8	0	0

Updated to match played 20 September 2017
Source: Competitions

=== Suspensions ===
Player	No.	Position	Reason	Competition	Date Served	Opponent(s)
(Senegal) Morgaro Gomis	21	MF	Third Yellow Card vs T-Team	Liga Super	8 April 2016	Pahang
(Malaysia) Mohd Qayyum	8	DF	Red Card vs Johor Darul Ta'zim	Liga Super	15 April	Penang

=== Summary ===
Games played	**29** (22 Liga Super) (1 Piala FA) (6 Piala Malaysia)
Games won	**9** (7 Liga Super) (2 Piala Malaysia)
Games drawn	**4** (4 Liga Super)
Games lost	**15** (10 Liga Super) (1 Piala FA) (4 Piala Malaysia)
Goals scored	**40** (31 Liga Super) (1 Piala FA) (8 Piala Malaysia)
Goals conceded	**52** (39 Liga Super) (1 Piala FA) (12 Piala Malaysia)
Goal difference	**–12** (–8 Liga Super) (0 Piala FA) (–4 Piala Malaysia)
Clean sheets	**2** (2 Liga Super) (0 Piala FA) (0 excluding friendly matches)
Yellow cards	**36** (27 Liga Super) (2 Piala FA) (8 Piala Malaysia)
Red cards	**1** (1 Liga Super) (0 Piala FA)
Most Yellow cards	(Senegal) Morgaro Gomis (5) (Malaysia) Indra Putra Mahayuddin (5)
Most Red cards	(Malaysia) Mohd Qayyum (1)
Most appearances	(The Gambia) Mamadou Danso (29)
Top scorer	(Malaysia) Mohd Khairul Izuan Rosli (5 goals)
Winning Percentage	Overall: 9/29 (31.03%)

Updated to match played 29 October 2017
Source: Competitions

=== Home attendance ===
Sultan Muhammad IV Stadium 2017 Malaysia Super League Attendance
Competition	Attendance	Away Team	Result
Liga Super Week 1	8,963	Melaka United	0−2
Liga Super Week 3	13,891	Johor Darul Ta'zim	2−3
Liga Super Week 5	20,853	Kedah	0−1
Liga Super Week 6	2,503	Selangor	0−2
Liga Super Week 8	10,653	T-Team	4−2
Liga Super Week 10	3,373	Pahang	1−2
Liga Super Week 12	8,924	Penang	2–2
Liga Super Week 14	1,251	Sarawak	0–2
Liga Super Week 16	1,253	Perak	0–2
Liga Super Week 19	1,061	Felda United	1–1
Liga Super Week 21	5,076	PKNS	1–1

Source: Sistem Pengurusan Maklumat Bolasepak

== Club officials ==
=== Board members ===
Board and management

- President: (Malaysia) Bibi Ramjani Ilias Khan
- Deputy president: (Malaysia) Afandi Hamzah
- Vice president: (Malaysia) Mohd Aizuddin Mohd Ghazali, Nik Pakheruddin Nik Abdul Kadir, Nik Izani Nik Ibrahim
- Secretary general: (Malaysia) Datuk Ismail Md Noor Ismail
- Assistant secretary general: (Malaysia) Wan Badri Wan Omar
- Treasurer: (Malaysia) Nik Aminaldin Nik Jaafar

Senior club staff

- Team manager: (Malaysia) Dato Seri Afandi Hamzah
- Assistant manager 1: (Malaysia) Datuk Muhammad Nasir Hamzah
- Assistant manager 2: (Malaysia) Amierul Hisham Lokman
- Administration and security officer: (Malaysia) Datuk Seri Mohd Fared Abdul Ghani
- Media officer: (Malaysia) Md Zuki
- Liaison officer: vacant

Coaching staff

- Technical Director: (Uruguay) Alfredo Carlos Gonzales
- Head coach: (Malaysia) Zahasmi Ismail
- First assistant coach: (Thailand) Satit Benso
- Second assistant coach: (Malaysia) Sideek Shamsuddin
- Goalkeeping coach: (Malaysia) Abdul Hamid Ramli
- Fitness coach: (Malaysia) Ahmad Nizan Ariffin
- Physiotherapist: (Malaysia) Muhammad Hishamuddin
- Masseur: (Malaysia) Mohd Fitri
- Kitman: (Malaysia) Harun Ismail
- Kit coordinator: (Malaysia) Mohd Suhaimi Harun
- Team doctor: (Malaysia) Dr Zahiruddin Abdullah Zawawi

Youth Coaching staff

- Under-21s Manager: (Malaysia) Wan Rakemi Wan Zahari
- Under-21s Assistant Manager: (Malaysia) Che Rastum Che Mood
- Under-21s Head coach: (Malaysia) Mohd Hashim Mustapha
- Under-21s Assistant coach: (Malaysia) Zahariman Ghazali
- Under-21s Goalkeeping coach: (Malaysia) Halim Napi
- Under-21s Physiotherapist: (Malaysia) Ahmad Faris Musa
- Under-21s Security Officer: (Malaysia) Normizal Ismail
- Under-21s Kitman: (Malaysia) Jusoh Jenal
- Under-21s Team Coordinator: (Malaysia) Ghazali Husin
- Under-21s Media Officer: (Malaysia) Ab Ghainizan Ab Bakar
- Under-19s Manager: (Malaysia) Amril Aiman Ab Aziz
- Under-19s Assistant Manager: (Malaysia) Danish Aklil Azlan
- Under-19s Assistant Manager: (Malaysia) Ahmad Faizal Husain
- Under-19s Head coach: (Malaysia) Sazami Shafii
- Under-19s Assistant coach: (Malaysia) Nik Ahmad Fadly Nik Leh
- Under-19s Goalkeeping coach: (Malaysia) Mohd Azam Othman
- Under-19s Coordinator Officer: (Malaysia) Ahmad Faisal Othman
- Under-19s Media Officer: (Malaysia) Fazuny Mohd Noor
- Under-19s Kitman: (Malaysia) Noor Azmi Mohd Nor

== Contracts ==
No.	Pos	Player	Until	Source
5	DF	(Malaysia) Nik Shahrul Azim Abdul Halim	31 December 2018	
19	GK	(Malaysia) Khairul Fahmi Che Mat	31 December 2018	
21	MF	(Senegal) Morgaro Gomis	30 July 2017	
9	FW	(Lebanon) Abou Bakr Al-Mel	18 November 2018	

== Transfers ==
First transfer window started in December 2017 to 22 January 2017 and Second transfer window will started on 15 May 2017 to 11 June 2017.

=== Transfers in ===
Date	Pos	No.	Player	From club	Transfer fee	Ref
30 November 2016	HC	–	(Malaysia) Zahasmi Ismail	(Putrajaya) MOF	Undisclosed Fee	
December 2016	GK	–	(Malaysia) Muhammad Syazwan Yusoff	(Malacca) Melaka United	Loan Ended	
20 December 2016	CB	11	(Malaysia) Hasmizan Kamarodin	Terengganu	Free transfer	
20 December 2016	LB	13	(Malaysia) Mohammad Abdul Aziz Ismail	(Malacca) Melaka United	Free transfer	
1 January 2017	RB	–	(Malaysia) Tuan Muhamad Faim Tuan Zainal Abidin	(Putrajaya) MOF	Loan Ended	
December 2016	LB / CB	6	(Malaysia) Mohd Farisham Ismail	Penang	Loan Ended	
December 2016	CB	27	(Malaysia) Faizol Nazlin Sayuti	(Putrajaya) MOF	Loan Ended	
December 2016	CM / FW	4	(Malaysia) Mohd Rozaimi Azwar	(Putrajaya) MOF	Loan Ended	
December 2016	CF	–	(Malaysia) Syahrul Azwari Ibrahim	Sarawak	Loan Ended	
15 January 2017	CF	22	(Lebanon) Mohammed Ghaddar	(Jordan) Al-Faisaly	Undisclosed Fee	
20 January 2017	CB	9	(The Gambia) Mamadou Danso	(United States) Rayo OKC	Free transfer	
20 January 2017	CF	29	(Brazil) Alessandro Celin	(Romania) CS Concordia Chiajna	Free transfer	
20 January 2017	CB	3	(Malaysia) S. Subramaniam	Selangor	Free transfer	
20 January 2017	RW	14	(Malaysia) S. Thinagaran	(Selangor) PKNS	Free transfer	
20 January 2017	CF	20	(Malaysia) Hattaphon Bun An	Free agent	Free transfer	
18 May 2017	CF	9	(Lebanon) Abou Bakr Al-Mel	(Lebanon) AC Tripoli	Undisclosed Fee	
27 May 2017	CF	—	(France) L'Imam Seydi	(Kuwait) Khaitan	Undisclosed Fee	
May 2017	CF	36	(Malaysia) Nik Azli Nik Alias	Kelantan FA U21s	Promoted	

=== Transfers out ===
Exit date	Pos	No.	Player	To club	Transfer fee	Ref
23 October 2016	HC	—	(Bulgaria) Velizar Popov	(Thailand) Sisaket (Note: Following Velizar's release he joined Sisaket.)	Released	
November 2016	GK	—	(Malaysia) Muhammad Syazwan Yusoff	Terengganu	Undisclosed Fee	
November 2016	GK	44	(Malaysia) Hasbullah Abdul Rahim	Kelantan U21s	Demoted	
December 2016	RB	38	(Malaysia) Mohd Aiman Shakir Mohd Hashim	Kelantan U21s	Demoted	
26 October 2016	CB	4	(Australia) Jonathan McKain	(Australia) Souths United (Note: Following Jonathan's release he joined Souths United.)	Free	
December 2016	RB	22	(Malaysia) Mohd Zafran Akramin Abdul Razak	(Kelantan) MPKB-BRI U-BeS (Note: Following Zafran's release he joined MPKB-BRI UBeS.)	Free	
5 December 2016	CB	20	(Malaysia) Muslim Ahmad	Pahang	Undisclosed Fee	
18 November 2016	LB / LW	13	(Malaysia) Noor Hazrul Mustafa	Negeri Sembilan (Note: Following Hazrul's release he joined Negeri Sembilan.)	Free	
18 November 2016	CM	29	(Malaysia) Mohd Faizal Abu Bakar	Negeri Sembilan (Note: Following Faizal's release he joined Negeri Sembilan.)	Free	
5 December 2016	RW / LW	7	(Malaysia) Wan Zaharulnizam Zakaria	Pahang (Note: Following Zaharulnizam's release he joined Pahang.)	Free	
4 December 2016	CM	11	(Malaysia) Brendan Gan	Free agent	Released	
22 November 2016	LW	8	(Malaysia) Wan Zack Haikal	(Kuala Lumpur) FELDA United (Note: Following Wan Zack's release he joined FELDA United.)	Free	
6 December 2016	AM	27	(Brazil) Wander Luiz Bitencourt Junior	(Saudi Arabia) Al-Raed (Note: Following Wander's release he joined Al-Raed.)	Free	
6 December 2016	CF	26	(North Macedonia) Baže Ilijoski	(North Macedonia) FK Pelister (Note: Following Baže's release he joined FK Pelister.)	Free	
6 December 2016	CF	—	(Malaysia) Syahrul Azwari Ibrahim	Johor Darul Ta'zim	Undisclosed Fee	
30 November 2016	CF	14	(Malaysia) Abdul Manaf Mamat	Kuala Lumpur (Note: Following Manaf's release he joined Kuala Lumpur.)	Free	
December 2016	CF	37	(Malaysia) Nik Azli Nik Alias	Kelantan U21s	Demoted	
20 January 2017	RB	37	(Malaysia) Tuan Muhamad Faim Tuan Zainal Abidin	Free agent	Released	
16 May 2017	CF	22	(Lebanon) Mohammed Ghaddar	Johor Darul Ta'zim	RM 1,400,000	

=== Loans out ===
Date from	Date to	Pos	Player	To	Ref
8 January 2017	December 2017	LM	(Malaysia) Mohd Nasharizam Abd Rashid	Perlis (Note: On 8 January 2017, it was announced that Nasharizam would stay at Perlis until the end of the season.)	
8 January 2017	December 2017	LW	(Malaysia) Amir Zikri Pauzi	Perlis (Note: On 8 January 2017, it was announced that Amir Zikri would stay at Perlis until the end of the season.)	
8 January 2017	December 2017	RM	(Malaysia) Mohd Syafiq Abd Rahman	Perlis (Note: On 8 January 2017, it was announced that Syafiq would stay at Perlis until the end of the season.)	
22 May 2017	December 2017	RB	(Malaysia) Nik Shahrul Azim	Negeri Sembilan (Note: In May 2017, it was announced that Nik Shahrul would stay at Negeri Sembilan until the end of the season.)	
11 June 2017	December 2017	CM	(Malaysia) Shahrul Hakim	(Kuala Lumpur) MISC-MIFA (Note: In June 2017, it was announced that Muhamad Shahrul Hakim Rahim would stay at MISC-MIFA until the end of the season.)	
11 June 2017	December 2017	CF	(Malaysia) Fakhrul Zaman	(Kuala Lumpur) MISC-MIFA (Note: In June 2017, it was announced that Fakhrul Zaman would stay at MISC-MIFA until the end of the season.)	

== Under 21s ==
=== Friendlies ===
3 February 2017 Friendly	Kelantan U21s	1−2	(Kelantan) Gua Musang	Kelantan
	? (?)		? (?) ? (?)

8 February 2017 Friendly	Kelantan U21s	1−0	(Kelantan) Bachok	Bachok, Kelantan
18:15 UTC+8	? (?)			Stadium: USM A Field

14 May 2017 Friendly	Kelantan U21s	0−1	(Kelantan) Tanah Merah	Tanah Merah, Kelantan
18:15 UTC+8			? (?)

=== Piala Presiden ===
23 February 2017 #1 (1)	Johor Darul Ta'zim III	1−1	Kelantan U21s	Pasir Gudang, Johor
16:45 UTC+8	Shahrul Akmal 25'	Report	Shahrul Nizam Ros Hasni 80'	Stadium: Pasir Gudang Corporation Stadium; Referee: Mohd Ridzuan Rozali

2 March 2017 #2 (11)	Kelantan U21s	3−1	Kedah U21s	Kota Bharu, Kelantan
16:45 UTC+8	Mohd Raihan 7'; Nik Azli 28'; Shahrul Nizam 66'	Report	Mohd Akhiyar 84'	Stadium: Sultan Muhammad IV Stadium; Referee: Syed Ahmad Ridhwan

9 March 2017 #3 (21)	Terengganu U21s	2−2	Kelantan U21s	Kuala Nerus, Terengganu
16:45 UTC+8	Wan Mohd Fazli 31'; Alif Fitri 61'	Report	Mohd Raihan 34'; Shahrul Nizam Ros Hasni 56' (pen.)	Stadium: Sultan Mizan Zainal Abidin Stadium

31 March 2017 #4 (31)	Kelantan U21s	2−1	Sarawak U21s	Kota Bharu, Kelantan
20:45 UTC+8	Imran Samso 16'; Nik Akif Syahiran 45'	Report	Nor Azizi 87'	Stadium: Sultan Muhammad IV Stadium

6 April 2017 #5 (41)	Melaka United U21s (Malacca)	1−1	Kelantan U21s	Ayer Keroh, Melaka
16:45 UTC+8	? (?)	Report	Nik Azli Nik Alias 30'	Stadium: Mini Stadium UTeM

13 April 2017 #6 (51)	Kelantan U21s	1−1	(Kuala Lumpur) Felda United U21s	Kota Bharu, Kelantan
16:45 UTC+8	? (?)	Report	? (?)	Stadium: Sultan Muhammad IV Stadium

17 April 2017 #7 (61)	PDRM U21s	0−1	Kelantan U21s	Kuala Lumpur
16:45 UTC+8		Report	Raihan (?l)	Stadium: PULAPOL Main Field; Referee: Mohamad Shahrul Fazlin

20 April 2017 #8 (71)	Kelantan U21s	1−1	Penang U21s	Kota Bharu, Kelantan
16:45 UTC+8	Muslim Kamaruddin 38'	Report	? (?)	Stadium: Sultan Muhammad IV Stadium; Referee: Hamdan Awang

27 April 2017 #9 (81)	UiTM U21s (Selangor)	0−3	Kelantan U21s	Shah Alam, Selangor
16:45 UTC+8		Report	Nik Azli 18', 34'; Ridhwan 88'	Stadium: UiTM Stadium

4 May 2017 #10 (91)	Kelantan U21s	1−1	(Selangor) UiTM U21s	Kota Bharu, Kelantan
16:45 UTC+8	Azwan 27'	Report	? (pen.), 90+1'	Stadium: Sultan Muhammad IV Stadium

8 May 2017 #11 (101)	Penang U21s	0−4	Kelantan U21s	Batu Kawan, Penang
16:45 UTC+8		Report	Raihan Huzaizi 41'; Muslim Kamaruddin 52'; Nik Akif Syahiran 86', 90+1'	Stadium: Penang State Stadium

11 May 2017 #12 (111)	Kelantan U21s	0−1	PDRM U21s	Kota Bharu, Kelantan
16:45 UTC+8		Report	? 36'	Stadium: Sultan Muhammad IV Stadium

18 May 2017 #13 (121)	Felda United U21s (Kuala Lumpur)	1−0	Kelantan U21s	Serdang, Selangor
16:45 UTC+8				Stadium: UPM Mini Stadium

22 May 2017 #14 (131)	Kelantan U21s	8−1	(Malacca) Melaka U21s	Kota Bharu, Kelantan
16:45 UTC+8	Nik Azli Nik Alias 4', 10', 21', 28', 46'; Shahrul Nizam 42'; Mohd Azam 61'; Raihan 88'		? 56'	Stadium: Sultan Muhammad IV Stadium; Referee: Hamdan Awang

5 July 2017 #15 (141)	Sarawak U21s	1−0	Kelantan U21s	Kuching, Sarawak
16:15 UTC+8				Stadium: Sarawak State Stadium

10 July 2017 #16 (151)	Kelantan U21s	3−4	Terengganu U21s	Kota Bharu, Kelantan
16:45 UTC+8				Stadium: Sultan Muhammad IV Stadium

24 July 2017 #17 (161)	Kedah U21s	1−2	Kelantan U21s	Sintok, Kedah
16:45 UTC+8	Aminuddin 65'	Report	Azli 22'; Raihan 60'	Stadium: UUM Mini Stadium; Referee: Muhammad Shahrul Amin Abd Aziz

31 July 2017 #18 (171)	Kelantan U21s	2−2	Johor Darul Ta'zim III	Kota Bharu, Kelantan
16:45 UTC+8	Danial 50'; Raihan 53'		Giannelli 20'; Syazwan 71'	Stadium: Sultan Muhammad IV Stadium; Referee: Mohamad Faizudin Ismail

21 September 2017 QF 1	Kelantan U21s	1−0	Negeri Sembilan	Kota Bharu, Kelantan
16:45 UTC+8	Danial 8'			Stadium: Sultan Muhammad IV Stadium

26 September 2017 QF 2	Negeri Sembilan	2−1 (2−2 agg.)	Kelantan U21s	Nilai, Negeri Sembilan
			Wan Mohamad Azam 52'	Stadium: USIM Mini Stadium

Source: Fixtures / Standings

=== Appearances ===
No.	Pos.	Name	U21 Matches	
No.	Pos.	Name	Apps	Goals
22	GK	Ahmad Syihan Hazmi Mohamed (c)	10	0
28	GK	Mohd Syafiq Zulkifli	8	0
2	DF	Ahmad Azri Ahmad Azam	12	0
3	DF	Muhd Aminudin Zulkifli	2	0
9	DF	Muhd Syaiful Alias	6	0
18	DF	Muhammad Muslim Kamaruddin	12	2
23	DF	Mohd Azwan Mohd Aripin (vc)	14	1
25	DF	Wan Mohd Ridhwan Wan Deraman	17	1
30	DF	Mohd Shahrul Nizam Ros Hasni	17	5
8	MF	Nik Syamsul Aidil Azri Mat Jusoh	1	0
13	MF	Mohd Aiman Shakir Mohd Hashim (vc)	16	0
14	MF	Muhamad Izzad Muhamad	1	0
16	MF	Nik Akif Syahiran Nik Mat	17	3
17	MF	Muhd Danial Ashraf Abdullah	4	1
26	MF	Muhd Fadhilah Mohd Pauzi	9	0
34	MF	Danial Haqim Draman	1	0
6	FW	Muhd Raihan Huzaizi (vc)	15	7
7	FW	Mohd Imran Samso	9	1
10	FW	Nik Azli Nik Alias	15	10
11	FW	Muhd Azam Mazlan	8	2

Last updated: 26 September 2017

== Under 19s ==
26 February 2017 #1 (4)	Pahang U19s	0−3	Kelantan U19s	Pekan, Pahang
16:45 UTC+8		Report	Ramani Nabil 47'; Hafiezal 86'; Azzrie 90+1'	Stadium: Padang Majlis Daerah Pekan

5 March 2017 #2 (10)	Kedah U19s	3−0	Kelantan U19s	Sintok, Kedah
16:45 UTC+8	Akmal Azmi 18', 26'; Farez Aiman Marzuki 80'	Report		Stadium: Mini Stadium UUM; Referee: Mohd Fusser Md Salih

8 March 2017 #3 (20)	Kelantan U19s	1−0	Penang U19s	Kota Bharu, Kelantan
16:45 UTC+8	Azzrie 69'	Report		Stadium: Sultan Muhammad IV Stadium; Referee: Mohd Hasrul Abdul Rahman

2 April 2017 #4 (30)	Kelantan U19s	2−4	(Johor) SSTMI U17s	Kota Bharu, Kelantan
16:45 UTC+8	Imran Samso 50'; Danial Haqim Draman 90+3'	Report	Syahmi Zamri 45+2'; Wan Arif Hakimi Wan Ahmad 56'; Ahmad Nur Rahman Ab Rasid 60'; Ramadhan Saifullah Usman 84'	Stadium: Sultan Muhammad IV Stadium; Referee: Samsudin Ibrahim

9 April 2017 #5 (39)*	Johor Darul Ta'zim IV	1−1	Kelantan U19s	Skudai, Johor Bahru
16:45 UTC+8	Muhd Nashrul Eiman 13'	Report	Mohd Fazrul Amir 53'	Stadium: UTM Mini Stadium

12 April 2017 #6 (48)	Terengganu U19s	1−0	Kelantan U19s	Kuala Nerus, Terengganu
16:45 UTC+8	? (?)	Report		Stadium: Padang Rumput Tiruan, Kansas Gong Badak; Referee: Mat Zan Abd Wahab

16 April 2017 #7 (57)	SSMP U17s (Pahang)	0−1	Kelantan U19s	Gambang, Pahang
16:45 UTC+8		Report	Nabil 83'	Stadium: SSMP Mini Stadium; Referee: Ahmad Saifullah Abu Bakar

21 April 2017 #8 (66)	Kelantan U19s	1−0	Sarawak	Kota Bharu, Kelantan
16:45 UTC+8	Muhd Hafiezal Che Normizi 41'	Report		Stadium: Sultan Muhammad IV Stadium; Referee: Mohd Fusser Md Sallih

30 April 2017 #9 (75)	PKNS U19s (Selangor)	1−3	Kelantan U19s	Kelana Jaya, Selangor
16:45 UTC+8		Report	Nabil 55'; Danial 64', 82'	Stadium: PKNS Field

3 May 2017 #10 (84)	Kelantan U19s	1−3	(Selangor) PKNS U19s	Kota Bharu, Kelantan
16:45 UTC+8	Danial Haqim 51'	Report		Stadium: Sultan Muhammad IV Stadium

7 May 2017 #11 (93)	Kelantan U19s	0−1	Terengganu U19s	Kota Bharu, Kelantan
16:45 UTC+8		Report	? 83'	Stadium: Sultan Muhammad IV Stadium

12 May 2017 #12 (102)	Sarawak U19s	1−0	Kelantan U19s	Kuching, Sarawak
16:15 UTC+8	? (?)	Report		Stadium: Sarawak Stadium

14 May 2017 #13 (111)	Kelantan U19s	1−0	Johor Darul Ta'zim IV	Kota Bharu, Kelantan
16:45 UTC+8	Danial Haqim 68'	Report		Stadium: Sultan Muhammad IV Stadium

20 May 2017 #14 (120)	Kelantan U19s	0−2	(Pahang) SSMP U17s	Kota Bharu, Kelantan
16:15 UTC+8				Stadium: Sultan Muhammad IV Stadium; Referee: Sukri Abd Rahman

2 July 2017 #15 (129)	SSTMI U17s (Johor)	2−0	Kelantan U19s	Bandar Penawar, Johor
16:45 UTC+8				Stadium: SSTMI Field

9 July 2017 #16 (137)	Penang U19s	1−0	Kelantan U19s	Batu Kawan, Penang
16:45 UTC+8		Report		Stadium: Penang State Stadium; Referee: Muhammad Munir Mohd Izam

12 July 2017 #17 (145)	Kelantan U19s	2−0	Kedah U19s	Kota Bharu, Kelantan
16:45 UTC+8				Stadium: Sultan Muhammad IV Stadium; Referee: Samsudin Ibrahim

30 July 2017 #18 (155)	Kelantan U19s	2−1	Pahang U19s	Kota Bharu, Kelantan
16:45 UTC+8	Taufiq 49'; Juzaerul 76'	Report	Izzat 51'	Stadium: Sultan Muhammad IV Stadium

Source: Fixtures / Standings

=== Appearances ===
No.	Pos.	Name	U19 Matches	
No.	Pos.	Name	Apps	Goals
19	GK	Mohammad Fikri Che Soh (c)	15	0
21	GK	Nik Mohd Amir Khusyairy Nik Mazlan	1	0
23	DF	Mohd Azzrie Aripin	13	2
24	DF	Muhammad Wazir Mustapha	14	0
30	DF	Ahmad Fathi Irfan	2	0
31	DF	Mohd Shahrul Nizam Ros Hasni	1	0
6	MF	Muhd Aliff Izuan Mohd Yusri	1	0
8	MF	Muhammad Syafiq Syahmi Husin	2	0
12	MF	Muhamad Hafiezal Che Normizi	14	2
13	MF	Muhd Hafieza	1	0
14	MF	Abdullah Al-Muizz	7	0
15	MF	Ahmad Azraf Ahmad Azam	7	0
18	MF	Mohd Syazwan Mazlan	9	0
22	MF	Mohd Fadzrul Amir Md Zaman	9	1
25	MF	Mohd Aidiel Mohd Suhaimi	2	0
27	MF	Muhd Aiman Naief Boskori	3	0
28	MF	Mohamad Fahmi Sabri	8	0
29	MF	Mohd Farisfathullah Mohd Azam (vc)	13	0
7	FW	Afiq Saluddin	8	0
10	FW	Mohd Danial Haqim Deraman	13	4
11	FW	Mohd Ramani Nabil Roslan	11	3
16	FW	Muhammad Juzaerul Jasmi	4	1
22	FW	Mohd Fazrul Amir	3	0
26	FW	Mohd Zulfadli Abd Aziz	6	0
32	FW	Mohd Imran Samso	1	1

Last updated: 31 July 2017

== Women's team ==
8 April 2017 Group stage	Sarawak	2−0	Kelantan	Miri, Sarawak
16:15 UTC+8				Stadium: Miri Stadium

9 April 2017 Group stage	Negeri Sembilan	1−1	Kelantan	Miri, Sarawak
08:00 UTC+8			Siti Hajar Mat Zaid	Stadium: Petroliam Recreation Club

10 April 2017 Group stage	Kelantan	0−3	Pahang	Miri, Sarawak
08:00 UTC+8				Stadium: Miri Stadium

Source: Fixtures

=== Appearances ===
No.	Pos.	Name	PTSR Matches	
No.	Pos.	Name	Apps	Goals
1	GK	Norsyafiqah Yuza	2	0
22	GK	Nur Aslinda Rozelan	0	0
26	GK	Zaliafa Ya'kob	0	0
8	DF	Lizawaty Abu Bakar (c)	1	0
10	DF	Siti Hajar Mat Zaid (vc)	2	1
12	DF	Shahiera Balqish Hamidi	0	0
14	DF	Che Mazni Che Manan	2	0
21	DF	Nur Athirah Abd Rahman	2	0
2	MF	Farahana Muhamad	2	0
3	MF	Wan Helwani Fatimah Wan Abdullah	0	0
6	MF	Siti Noorhidayat Ghazali	0	0
7	MF	Salwani Selamat	1	0
11	MF	Hizra Nursyafiqa Zakaria	2	0
18	MF	Nur Aziyati Che Norddin	2	0
29	MF	Nur Ain Najihah Arshad	2	0
9	FW	Nor Syardilla Samsul Khahar	2	0
13	FW	Siti Fakhira Bahrudin	2	0
25	FW	Fatin Fatihah Rezuan	0	0

Last updated: 9 April 2017
