= List of Malaysian football transfers 2015 second transfer window =

List of Malaysian football transfers

This is a list of Malaysian football transfers for the 2015 second transfer window. Moves featuring Malaysia Super League, Malaysia Premier League and Malaysia FAM Cup club are listed.

2015 second transfer window opened on 1 April and closed on 28 April.

== 2015 Second Transfers ==
All clubs without a flag are Malaysian. Otherwise it will be stated.

=== Transfers ===
Date	Name	Moving from	Moving to	Fee (Note: Transfer fees are gathered from the various and may not be exact)
10 February 2015	(Lebanon) Hassan Chaito	Terengganu	Unattached	N/A
1 April 2015	(Netherlands) Ronald Hikspoors	Sarawak	Unattached	N/A
1 April 2015	(Liberia) Patrick Gerhardt	(Australia) Melbourne City	Sarawak	Free
1 April 2015	(Malaysia) Amirul Azhan	Perak Youth	Perak	Free
1 April 2015	(Malaysia) G. Mugenthirran	Perak Youth	Perak	Free
1 April 2015	(Malaysia) Rafiq Faeez Fuad	Perak	Unattached	N/A
1 April 2015	(Malaysia) Faizal Mansor	Perak	Unattached	N/A
1 April 2015	(Malaysia) Rafiq Faeez Fuad	Perak	Unattached	N/A
1 April 2015	(Brazil) Marco Tulio	Perak	Unattached	N/A
1 April 2015	(Malaysia) Fazly Mazlan	Johor Darul Ta'zim II	Johor Darul Ta'zim	Free
1 April 2015	(Malaysia) Afiq Amsyar	ATM	DRB-HICOM	Free
1 April 2015	(Malaysia) Fandi Othman	Johor Darul Ta'zim	Johor Darul Ta'zim II	Free
1 April 2015	(Uzbekistan) Dilshod Sharofetdinov	Sime Darby	(Uzbekistan) Dinamo Samarqand	Free
1 April 2015	(Croatia) Josip Milardović	(Croatia) NK Inter Zaprešić	T–Team	Free
1 April 2015	(Brazil) Reinaldo Elias	(Brazil) Caxias	Sime Darby	Free
1 April 2015	(Brazil) Gilmar	(Brazil) Lajeadense	Kelantan	Free
8 April 2015	(Haiti) Fabrice Noël	(Singapore) Tampines Rovers	Kuantan	Free
9 April 2015	(Jamaica) Horace James	(Canada) FC Edmonton	Perak	Free
9 April 2015	(Kosovo) Liridon Krasniqi	(Turkey) Osmanlıspor	Kedah	Free
9 April 2015	(Brazil) Sandro	(Brazil) ABC	Kedah	Free
9 April 2015	(Malaysia) Matthew Davies	(Australia) Perth Glory	Pahang	Free
9 April 2015	(Malaysia) Norshahrul Idlan	ATM	Terengganu	Free
16 April 2015	(Malaysia) Christie Jayaseelan	ATM	Felda United	Free
20 April 2015	(Malaysia) Fadzli Saari	ATM	Sime Darby	Free
20 April 2015	(Brazil) Thiago Augusto	(Bahrain) Manama Club	Felda United	Free
21 April 2014	(Liberia) Edward Junior	Felda United	Unattached	N/A
24 April 2014	(Portugal) Jaime Bragança	(Brazil) Vila Nova	PDRM	Free
26 April 2015	(Australia) Joel Chianese	(New Zealand) Auckland City	Sabah	Undisclosed
26 April 2015	(Nigeria) Onorionde Kughegbe	PDRM	(Indonesia) Mitra Kukar	Free
26 April 2015	(Malaysia) Shahril Izwan	PDRM	Unattached	N/A
28 April 2015	(Malaysia) Amirizdwan Taj	ATM	Kelantan	Free
1 July 2015	(Sierra Leone) Alhaji Kamara	Johor Darul Ta'zim	(Sweden) IFK Norrköping	Loan return
1 July 2015	(Cameroon) Emmanuel Kenmogne	Kelantan	(Indonesia) Persija Jakarta	Free
1 July 2015	(Liberia) Isaac Pupo	Kelantan	Unattached	N/A

=== Loans ===
Date	Name	Moving from	Moving to
1 March 2015	(Malaysia) Faizol Nazlin	Kelantan	Sabah
1 March 2015	(Malaysia) Rozaimi Azwar	Kelantan	Sabah
1 March 2015	(Nigeria) Austin Amutu	(Nigeria) Warri Wolves	Kelantan
4 March 2015	(Argentina) Patito Rodríguez	(Brazil) Santos	Johor Darul Ta'zim
31 March 2015	(Sierra Leone) Alhaji Kamara	(Sweden) IFK Norrköping	Johor Darul Ta'zim
1 April 2015	(Malaysia) Nor Hakim Hassan	Terengganu	T–Team
1 April 2015	(Malaysia) Izzuddin Hussin	Terengganu	T–Team
1 April 2015	(Malaysia) Izzaq Faris	Terengganu	T–Team
12 July 2015	(Argentina) Jorge Pereyra Díaz	Johor Darul Ta'zim	(Argentina) Independiente

=== Unattached Players ===
Date	Name	New Club
1 April 2015	(Canada) Issey Nakajima-Farran	Terengganu
1 April 2015	(Malaysia) Safril Hafizzie	ATM
1 April 2015	(Malaysia) Hanafi Azizan	ATM
1 April 2015	(Malaysia) Khairul Izwan	PDRM
