= Danial Ashraf =

Malaysian footballer

Personal information
- Full name: Muhammad Danial Ashraf bin Abdullah
- Date of birth: 8 January 1997 (age 29)
- Place of birth: Kelantan, Malaysia
- Height: 1.70 m (5 ft 7 in)
- Position: Attacking midfielder

Youth career
- 2014: Kelantan U19
- 2015: → Harimau Muda C (loan)
- 2016: Kelantan U21

Senior career*
Years	Team	Apps	(Gls)
2016–2020	Kelantan	46	(6)
2021–2022	Penang	31	(5)
2023–2024	Kelantan		
2024–2025	PIB		

International career^{‡}
2015–2016	Malaysia U19	8	(3)
2017–2019	Malaysia U23	5	(3)
- * Club domestic league appearances and goals ‡ National team caps and goals as of 23 July 2017

Muhammad Danial Ashraf bin Abdullah (born 8 January 1997) is a Malaysian professional footballer who plays as an attacking midfielder.

== Club career ==
=== Early career ===
Danial began his career with the Kelantan U19 in 2014. He was included in the team that won the 2014 Malaysia Youth League, he making a goal in the final against PDRM U19. In 2015, he was loaned to Harimau Muda C before the program was cancelled later he returned to Kelantan. He was promoted to Kelantan FA U21 in 2016 that won the 2016 Malaysia President's Cup.

=== Kelantan FA ===
He was selected into the Malaysia national football team for the 2016 Malaysia Cup and the 2017 Malaysia Super League. On 18 February 2017, he made his league debut coming on as a substitute for Alessandro Celin.

== Career statistics ==
=== Club ===
As of 12 September 2021

Appearances and goals by club, season and competition
Club	Season	League			National cup		League cup		Continental		Total	
Club	Season	Division	Apps	Goals	Apps	Goals	Apps	Goals	Apps	Goals	Apps	Goals
Kelantan	2016	Malaysia Super League	0	0	0	0	2	0	–		2	0
Kelantan	2017	Malaysia Super League	12	2	0	0	3	0	–		15	2
Kelantan	2018	Malaysia Super League	13	3	0	0	6	1	–		19	4
Kelantan	2019	Malaysia Premier League	12	0	0	0	0	0	–		12	0
Kelantan	2020	Malaysia Premier League	9	1	–		1	2	–		10	3
Kelantan	Total		46	6	0	0	12	3	–		58	9
Penang	2021	Malaysia Super League	19	4	–		6	0	–		25	4
Penang	2022	Malaysia Super League	12	1	1	0	1	0	–		14	1
Penang	Total		31	5	1	0	7	0	–		39	5

== Honours ==
Kelantan U19

- Youth League: 2014

Kelantan U21

- President Cup: 2016
