= Qayyum Marjoni =

Malaysian footballer (born 1994)

Muhammad Qayyum
Personal information
- Full name: Muhammad Qayyum bin Marjoni Sabil
- Date of birth: 28 March 1994 (age 32)
- Place of birth: Kelantan, Malaysia
- Height: 1.69 m (5 ft 7 in)
- Position: Midfielder

Team information
- Current team: Immigration FC II
- Number: 12

Youth career
- 2012–2015: Kelantan Academy
- 2014: → Harimau Muda (loan)
- 2014: → Harimau Muda B (loan)

Senior career*
| Years | Team | Apps | (Gls) |
| 2016–2017 | Kelantan | 32 | (0) |
| 2018–2019 | PKNS | 33 | (1) |
| 2020 | Kuala Lumpur City | 10 | (0) |
| 2021–2022 | Kelantan United | 15 | (1) |
| 2023 | Kuching City | 8 | (0) |
| 2023 | Kelantan United | 5 | (0) |
| 2024–2025 | PT Athletic | | |
| 2025–2026 | Carabat F.C. | | |
- * Club domestic league appearances and goals

Muhammad Qayyum bin Marjoni Sabil (born 28 March 1994) is a Malaysian professional footballer.

== Club career ==
=== Early career ===
Qayyum started his career with Kelantan FA President's Cup in 2012. He was also be the part of the team after winning the 2013 Malaysian President's Cup. In December 2015, Qayyum along with 4 of his teammates from Kelantan FA President's Cup team has been promoted to the senior squad for 2016 Malaysia Super League campaign.

=== Harimau Muda B ===
In 2014, he joined Harimau Muda which competing in the National Premier Leagues Queensland and later in July he joined Harimau Muda B. For 2015 season, he returns to his former club, Kelantan FA U21 team.

=== Kelantan ===
After showing a good performances with the youth team, he was selected into the senior team for 2013 Malaysia Cup campaign. He was later promoted to the senior team squad for 2016 Malaysia Super League campaign and debuted on 23 April during the match against Terengganu FA at Sultan Muhammad IV Stadium with the team won 3–0. After his impressive debut for the team, he retained his position in the team's first eleven even after the changes of the head coach which is at this time under the guidance of Velizar Popov.

At the start of the 2017 season, Qayyum was allocated the number 7 shirt, previously worn by the recently transferred Wan Zack Haikal. He made his first appearance of the season as the first eleven in Kelantan's opening match, a 1–2 away win to FELDA United.

=== PKNS ===
On 13 November 2017, Qayyum announced his transferred to PKNS, signing a one-year contract with the option of an additional one.

== Career statistics ==
=== Club ===
As of 20 July 2019

| Club | Season | League | | Cup | | League Cup | | Continental | | Total | |
| Club | Season | Apps | Goals | Apps | Goals | Apps | Goals | Apps | Goals | Apps | Goals |
|---|---|---|---|---|---|---|---|---|---|---|---|
| Harimau Muda B | 2014 | 11 | 0 | 0 | 0 | 1 | 0 | – | – | 12 | 0 |
| Total | | 11 | 0 | 0 | 0 | 1 | 0 | – | – | 12 | 0 |
| Kelantan | 2016 | 12 | 0 | 0 | 0 | 4 | 0 | – | – | 16 | 0 |
| Kelantan | 2017 | 20 | 0 | 1 | 0 | 6 | 0 | – | – | 27 | 0 |
| Total | | 32 | 0 | 1 | 0 | 10 | 0 | – | – | 43 | 0 |
| PKNS | 2018 | 16 | 1 | 1 | 0 | 6 | 0 | – | – | 23 | 1 |
| PKNS | 2019 | 17 | 0 | 3 | 0 | 0 | 0 | – | – | 20 | 0 |
| Total | | 33 | 1 | 4 | 0 | 6 | 0 | – | – | 43 | 1 |

== Honours ==
Kelantan U-21

- Malaysia President Cup: 2013, 2015
