= Shahrizan Ismail =

Malaysian footballer

Personal information
- Full name: Mohd Shahrizan bin Ismail
- Date of birth: 3 November 1979 (age 47)
- Place of birth: Kota Bharu, Kelantan, Malaysia
- Height: 1.70 m (5 ft 7 in)
- Position: Goalkeeper

Team information
- Current team: AZM Rovers F.C. (GK coach)

Youth career
- 1994–1995: Kelantan U21

Senior career*
Years	Team	Apps	(Gls)
1995–1997	Kelantan		
1997–1997	Kelantan TNB		
1998–2001	Kelantan		
2001–2004	Selangor		
2005–2007	Terengganu		
2008–2018	Kelantan		
2019–2020	Kelantan United		
- * Club domestic league appearances and goals

Mohd Shahrizan bin Ismail (born 3 November 1979) is a Malaysian former footballer who played as a goalkeeper.

== Club career ==
=== Kelantan ===
Born in Kota Bharu, Kelantan, Shahrizan began his football career with Kelantan's youth team in 90's. Shahrizan was Kelantan's first-choice goalkeeper from 2008 to 2009. He also helped his team lift Piala Emas Raja-Raja in 2010.

In 2011, Shahrizan played 3 times in important matches with Johor FC (Round 2 of FA Cup, Kelantan won 1–0), Terengganu (6 June Kelantan's Super League won 3–0) and Perak (Super League on 14 June Kelantan won 1–0) and successfully completed the task without conceding any goals in three matches.

For 2017 season, Shahrizan made one appearance for Kelantan in a 5–0 defeat to Kedah on 26 July 2017.

== Club statistics ==
As of 11 July 2018.

Appearances and goals by club, season and competition
Club	Season	League			Cup		League Cup		Continental		Total	
Club	Season	Division	Apps	Goals	Apps	Goals	Apps	Goals	Apps	Goals	Apps	Goals
Kelantan	2007–08	Malaysia Premier League	??				-		—			
Kelantan	2009	Malaysia Super League	??						—			
Kelantan	2010	Malaysia Super League	0	0					—			
Kelantan	2011	Malaysia Super League	2	0	1	0			—		3	0
Kelantan	2012	Malaysia Super League	3	0					3	0		
Kelantan	2013	Malaysia Super League	1	0	0	0	0	0	0	0	1	0
Kelantan	2014	Malaysia Super League	0	0	0	0	1	0	0	0	1	0
Kelantan	2015	Malaysia Super League	3	0	0	0	1	0	—		4	0
Kelantan	2016	Malaysia Super League	0	0	0	0	1	0	—		1	0
Kelantan	2017	Malaysia Super League	1	0	0	0	0	0	—		1	0
Kelantan	2018	Malaysia Super League	8	0	0	0	0	0	—		8	0
Kelantan	Total		100	0	1	0	3	0	3	0	107	0
Career total												

== Honours ==
=== Kelantan President Cup team ===
- Malaysia President Cup: 1995

=== Kelantan ===
- Malaysia Premier League: 2000
- Malaysia Super League: 2011, 2012; Runner-up 2010
- Malaysia FA Cup: 2012, 2013; Runner-up 2009, 2011, 2015
- Malaysia Cup: 2010, 2012; Runner-up 2009, 2013
- Malaysia Charity Shield: 2011; Runner-up 2012, 2013
- Unity Cup: Runner-up 2011

=== Selangor ===
- Malaysian Super League: 2002
- Malaysian Cup: 2002
- Malaysia FA Cup: 2001
- Malaysia Charity Shield: 2002; Runner-up 2003
- The Sultan of Selangor's Cup: 2001, 2003; Runner-up 2002, 2004
