= Faizol Nazlin =

Malaysian footballer

Personal information
- Full name: Faizol Nazlin Bin Sayuti
- Date of birth: 27 October 1992 (age 34)
- Place of birth: Pasir Mas, Kelantan, Malaysia
- Height: 1.73 m (5 ft 8 in)
- Position: Centre back

Youth career
- 2009–2013: Kelantan U21

Senior career*
Years	Team	Apps	(Gls)
2014–2018	Kelantan	44	(0)
2015	Sabah (loan)	10	(1)
2016	MOF (loan)	14	(0)
2019–2020	Kelantan United	38	(1)
- * Club domestic league appearances and goals as of 29 July 2018

Faizol Nazlin bin Sayuti (born 27 October 1992) is a Malaysian footballer who mainly plays as centre-back but sometimes as a defensive midfielder. He is also the captain of 2013 Kelantan President Cup Team that is the champion Malaysia President Cup after winning in the final against Perak President Cup Team 2–1. He later loaned to Sabah on 2015 for a season.

== Club career ==
=== Early career ===
Faizol began his football career playing for Kelantan President's Cup team in 2009. He was the captain of the team and managed to bring his team won the 2013 Presidents Cup. In 2014, he made his debut with Kelantan senior team. He has been sent to England to have a training with Blackburn Rovers, he has been sent there with another player, Dimitri Petratos.

=== Sabah FA ===
On 30 April 2015, Faizol signed with Malaysia Premier League side, Sabah on loan deal until the end of the 2015 season via second window transfer under Mike Mulvey as head coach.

=== MOF FC ===
In 2016, he later moved to FAM League club, MOF on one-year loan deal. Zahasmi Ismail was the head coach of the club that time. Faizol help the club secure second place of the table during 2016 FAM League season.

=== Kelantan ===
After a season with Putrajaya-based club, MOF loan ended, he returns to Kelantan at the end of the 2016 season. He remained with Kelantan for 2017 season till April 2018 before released by the club.

== Club statistics ==
=== Club ===
As of 29 July 2018

Appearances and goals by club, season and competition
Club	Season	League			Cup		League Cup		Continental		Total	
Club	Season	Division	Apps	Goals	Apps	Goals	Apps	Goals	Apps	Goals	Apps	Goals
Kelantan	2017	Malaysia Super League	6	0	0	0	1	0	—		7	0
Kelantan	2018	Malaysia Super League	1	0	0	0	0	0	—		1	0
Kelantan	Total		7	0	0	0	1	0	0	0	8	0
Career total			0	0	0	0	0	0	0	0	0	0

== Honours ==
=== Club ===
Kelantan U21

- Piala Presiden: 2013

== Personal life ==
He also has a brother named Famirul Asyraf Sayuti who is also a football player
