= Hattaphon Bun An =

Thai–Malaysian footballer (born 1991)

Personal information
- Full name: Hattaphon a/l Bun An
- Date of birth: 5 May 1991 (age 35)
- Place of birth: Jitra, Malaysia
- Height: 1.74 m (5 ft 8 1/2 in)
- Positions: Forward; winger

Team information
- Current team: Sarawak FA
- Number: 28

Youth career
  - 2012: Kedah FA President Cup

Senior career*
Years	Team	Apps	(Gls)
2010–2013	Kedah	27	(0)
2014	T–Team		
2015	Kuala Lumpur	10	(3)
2017–2018	Kelantan	7	(0)
2019	Langkawi Glory United	10	(8)
2020–	Sarawak FA	0	(0)

International career^{‡}
2011	Malaysia U23	17	(13)
- * Club domestic league appearances and goals as of 19 October 2019 ‡ National team caps and goals as of 24 January 2017

Hattaphon Bun An (born 5 May 1991, in Jitra, Kedah) is a Thai-Malaysian professional footballer who plays as a forward and left winger for Malaysia M3 League club Langkawi Glory United.

== Club career ==
=== Kedah FA ===
Hattaphon was a product of Kedah FA youth system, first playing for the team in the Kedah FA U-21 team, compete in the Malaysia President Cup competition. Later he was promoted to the senior team and was playing regularly in their 2013 Malaysia Premier League season.

=== T-Team FC ===
Hattaphon joined T-Team, a club based in Kuala Terengganu, for the 2014 Malaysia Super League season. At T-Team, he was converted to a winger due to shortage of players in that position, from his normal position as a striker.

=== Kuala Lumpur FA ===
In January 2015, Hattaphon joined Kuala Lumpur FA for 2015 Malaysia Premier League season after a season with Kuala Terengganu based club, T-Team. Hattaphon was later released during mid season due to injury.

=== Kelantan FA ===
In January 2016, Hattaphon been seen playing for Kelantan FA in a pre season matches. He scored one goal in a friendly match against UiTM. On 20 January 2016, he later was confirmed as part of the senior team. On 27 January 2017, he made his debut playing against PKNS F.C. in Shah Alam Stadium when he replaced Indra Putra in the 89th minute, match end up Kelantan won 3–1.

== Career Statistic ==
=== Club statistics ===
As of 28 October 2017.

Appearances and goals by club, season and competition
Club	Season	League			Cup		League Cup		Continental		Total	
Club	Season	Division	Apps	Goals	Apps	Goals	Apps	Goals	Apps	Goals	Apps	Goals
Kedah	2011	Liga Super	9	0	0	0	0	0	—		9	0
Kedah	2012	Liga Super	??	??	??	??	??	??	—		??	??
Kedah	2013	Liga Super	??	??	??	??	??	??	—		??	??
Kedah	Total		??	??	??	??	??	??	–		0	0
T-Team	2014	Liga Super	??	??	??	??	??	??	—		??	??
T-Team	Total		??	??	??	??	??	??	–		??	??
Kuala Lumpur	2015	Liga Premier	10	3	0	0	0	0	—		10	3
Kuala Lumpur	Total		10	3	0	0	0	0	–		10	3
Kelantan	2017	Liga Super	7	0	0	0	3	0	—		10	0
Kelantan	Total		7	0	0	0	3	0	0	0	10	0
Career total			0	0	0	0	0	0	0	0	0	0
