= Aziz Ismail =

Malaysian footballer (born 1988)

Personal information
- Full name: Mohammad Ab Aziz bin Ismail
- Date of birth: 7 August 1988 (age 38)
- Place of birth: Pengkalan Chepa, Kelantan, Malaysia
- Height: 1.69 m (5 ft 6 1/2 in)
- Position: Left-back

Team information
- Current team: Kelantan WTS
- Number: 5

Senior career*
Years	Team	Apps	(Gls)
2009–2010	KL PLUS	3	(1)
2011–2014	Kelantan	37	(6)
2015	Pahang	16	(4)
2016	Melaka	14	(6)
2017	Kelantan		
2019	Perlis		
2019	Penang		
2020	Kelantan United		
2025–	Kelantan WTS		
- * Club domestic league appearances and goals

Mohammad Ab Aziz bin Ismail (born 7 August 1988) is a Malaysian professional footballer who plays as a left-back for Malaysia A1 Semi-Pro League club Kelantan WTS.

== Club career ==
=== Kelantan FA ===
In November 2010, Aziz completed his transfer to Kelantan from Kuala Lumpur-based club, KL Plus. Aziz has helped KL Plus qualify for the quarter-finals of the Malaysia Cup in 2009. In the middle of the 2012 season, Aziz has got ACL injury. The repeating injury has left him unable to play during the 2013 season. On 16 November 2013, Aziz extended his contract for two years. On 22 November 2014, he was released and signed one-year contract with Pahang FA.

=== Melaka United ===
On 5 January 2016, Aziz signed one-year contract with Malaysia Premier League club Melaka United.

=== Return to Kelantan FA ===
In December 2016, despite the turmoil of withdrawal from the 2017 Malaysia Super League, Aziz Ismail returned to Kelantan after helping Melaka United win the Premier League. On 4 March 2017, Aziz made his season debut against Perak. Kelantan won the match by 4–2.

== Injury ==
Aziz went through knee surgery in January 2013 and missed half a year of action.

== Honours ==
=== Kelantan ===
- Liga Super: 2012, 2011
- Piala Malaysia: 2012
- Piala FA: 2012; Runner-up 2011
- Piala Sumbangsih: 2011; Runner-up 2012, 2013

=== Melaka United ===
- Liga Premier: 2016

=== KL Plus ===
- Liga Premier; Runner-up 2007–08

== Career statistics ==
=== Club ===
As of 9 September 2017

Club performance			League		Cup		League Cup		Continental		Total	
Season	Club	League	Apps	Goals	Apps	Goals	Apps	Goals	Apps	Goals	Apps	Goals
2016	Melaka United	Liga Premier	8	0	1	0	5	0	—		14	0
Total			8	0	1	0	5	0	0	0	14	0
2017	Kelantan	Liga Super	6	0	1	0	3	0	—		10	0
Total			6	0	1	0	3	0	0	0	10	0
Career total			14	0	2	0	8	0	0	0	24	0
