= S. Thinagaran =

Malaysian footballer

Personal information
- Full name: Thinagaran a/l Santhanathevan
- Date of birth: 5 January 1986 (age 40)
- Place of birth: Malaysia
- Height: 1.66 m (5 ft 5 in)
- Positions: Right midfielder; right winger

Senior career*
Years	Team	Apps	(Gls)
2009–2010	Penang	13	(4)
2011–2012	USM Staff	18	(7)
2013	PBAPP	11	(2)
2014–2015	ATM	20	(4)
2016	PKNS	13	(1)
2017	Kelantan	4	(1)
- * Club domestic league appearances and goals as of 23:14, 28 October 2017 (UTC)

Thinagaran a/l Santhanathevan (born 5 January 1986) is a Malaysian professional footballer who plays as a right midfielder and sometimes as a right winger.

== Career ==
=== PKNS FC ===
Thinagaran signed with Selangor-based club, PKNS FC in 2016 season that compete in Malaysia Premier League.

=== Kelantan FA ===
On 20 January 2017, Thinagaran was confirmed signed with Kota Bharu based team, Kelantan FA one day before 2017 Malaysia Super League kick start. On 27 January 2017, he made his debut playing against PKNS FC when he replaced Nor Farhan at 66th minutes and play until the end of the game. Kelantan won 3–1.

== Career statistics ==
As of match played 28 October 2017.

Club performance			League		Cup		League Cup		Continental		Total	
Season	Club	League	Apps	Goals	Apps	Goals	Apps	Goals	Apps	Goals	Apps	Goals
2017	Kelantan	Liga Super	4	1	0	0	0	0	–		4	1
Total			4	1	0	0	0	0	–		4	1
Career total			4	1	0	0	0	0	–		4	1
