= S. Subramaniam (footballer) =

Malaysian footballer

Personal information
- Full name: Subramaniam a/l Sooryapparad
- Date of birth: 31 August 1985 (age 41)
- Place of birth: Sungai Siput, Kuala Kangsar, Perak, Malaysia
- Height: 1.73 m (5 ft 8 in)
- Position: Defender

Team information
- Current team: Vacant

Youth career
- 2004: Perak U-21

Senior career*
Years	Team	Apps	(Gls)
2004–2005	Perak		
2006–2007	→ UPB-MyTeam (loan)		
2008–2009	Perak		
2010–2013	Kelantan	8	(1)
2014–2015	Johor Darul Ta'zim		
2015–2016	Selangor		
2017–2018	Kelantan	7	(0)
2018–2019	Petaling Jaya City	8	(0)
2020	Kuala Lumpur		
2021–2022	Petaling Jaya City		

International career
2007–2008	Malaysia U-23	7	(1)
2008	Malaysia XI	1	(0)
2008–2012	Malaysia	7	(0)
- * Club domestic league appearances and goals

Subramaniam a/l Sooryapparad (born 31 August 1985) is a Malaysian former professional footballer and current coach who mainly played as a centre-back and a defensive midfielder. He is former caretaker head coach of Malaysia Super League club Melaka.

== Club career ==
=== Perak ===
Subramaniam began his football career in 2004 playing for Perak youth team.

=== UPB-MyTeam (loan) ===
In 2006 while still playing for Perak FA, Subramaniam was loaned out to Liga Premier club, UPB-MyTeam for two seasons. That time he played under coach Bojan Hodak. MyTeam finished the 2006–07 season as runners-up behind PDRM, and as a result were promoted to the Malaysia Super League in 2007–08 season.

=== Return to Perak ===
He was recalled to Perak for their Malaysia Cup campaign, in which he excelled along the campaign. Ironically Perak coach Steve Darby was originally unaware that Subramaniam was actually a Perak player. As a result of these performances, Subramaniam was called up for various matches with the national team. He only made six appearances for Perak for the entire 2007 season. He was one of a handful of players who remained with Perak at the end of 2008 following the team's financial difficulties. Subramaniam was announced as Perak team captain for the 2009 season, replacing Ahmad Shahrul Azhar.

=== Kelantan ===
In 2010, Subramaniam joined east coast Malaysia based team, Kelantan. He played for the team from 2010 until 2014 after he left for southern club, Johor Darul Ta'zim at the end of the 2014 season. He helped Kelantan win the Malaysia Cup in 2010 and later clinch the 2011 Malaysia Super League season league title. During 2012 season, he was part of the treble winners when Kelantan won all three Malaysia Super League, FA Cup and Malaysia Cup.

=== Return to Kelantan ===
On 20 January 2017, Subramaniam signed with Kelantan for second stints. He returned to the team after 2 seasons playing for Klang valley based team, Selangor. He last played for Kelantan from 2010 until 2013 before moved to south Malaysia club, Johor Darul Ta'zim in 2014 season.

== Injury ==
In 2012, Subramaniam got the anterior cruciate ligament injury after colliding with an ATM player, Hairuddin Omar, in 2012 Malaysia Cup final.

== International career ==
Subramaniam has earned national caps at various age levels. He was part of the Malaysia Under-23 side that played in the Olympic qualifiers between February and June 2007. Upon his return from that assignment, Subramaniam was then called up for training with the senior team.

He has also captained the Under-23 side on several occasions.

He played at the 2007 SEA Games campaign, starting beside Aidil Zafuan at the heart of Malaysian defence during the final group game against Singapore, and had a terrible time trying to mark out Singaporean, Khairul Amri.

He made his senior debut against Indonesia on 6 June 2008. He also played for the Malaysia XI squad against Chelsea at Shah Alam Stadium on 29 July 2008. He was also included in the national squads that played in the 2008 Merdeka Tournament and 2008 Myanmar Grand Royal Challenge Cup.

In 2011, he was called up for the national team for a friendly match against Chelsea . He also captained but unfortunately the team lost by one goal.

After a three-year hiatus, he was recalled by the Malaysia national team for friendlies against Philippines in early 2012.

== Career statistics ==
=== Club ===
As of 20 September 2017

Club performance			League		Cup		League Cup		Continental		Total	
Season	Club	League	Apps	Goals	Apps	Goals	Apps	Goals	Apps	Goals	Apps	Goals
Malaysia			League		Piala FA		Piala Malaysia		Asia		Total	
2015	Selangor	Liga Super	0	0	0	0	0	0	—		0	0
2016	Selangor	Liga Super	0	0	0	0	2	0	—		2	0
Total			0	0	0	0	2	0	0	0	2	0
2017	Kelantan	Liga Super	7	0	0	0	4	0	—		11	0
Total			7	0	0	0	4	0	0	0	11	0
Career total			0	0	0	0	0	0	0	0	0	0

== Managerial statistics ==
As of 28 December 2025

Managerial record by team and tenure
Team	Nat.	From	To	Record								Ref.
Team	Nat.	From	To	G	W	D	L	GF	GA	GD	Win %	Ref.
Melaka (caretaker)	(Malaysia)	26 December 2025	28 December 2025	1	0	0	1	0	3	−3	0.00	
Career Total				1	0	0	1	0	3	−3	0.00	

== Honours ==
=== Club ===
Johor Darul Ta'zim

- Malaysia Super League: 2014

MyTeam

- Malaysia Premier League: Runner-up 2006–07

Kelantan

- Malaysia Super League: 2011, 2012; Runner-up 2010
- Malaysia Cup: 2010, 2012
- Malaysia FA Cup: 2012; Runner-up 2011
- Malaysia Charity Shield: 2011; Runner-up 2012, 2013
- Piala Emas Raja-Raja: 2010

Selangor

- Malaysia Cup: 2015 Runner-up 2016

=== Managerial ===
Melaka (assistant coaches)

- Malaysia A1 Semi-Pro League: 2024–25
