= Zahasmi Ismail =

Malaysian footballer and coach

Personal information
- Full name: Zahasmi Bin Ismail
- Date of birth: 18 April 1967 (age 59)
- Place of birth: Kelantan, Malaysia
- Position: Central defender

Team information
- Current team: Kelantan United (head coach)

Senior career*
Years	Team	Apps	(Gls)
1986–1994	Kelantan	84	(19)
1994–1996	Terengganu	21	(3)
1997–1999	Kelantan	23	(6)
2000–2004	JKR Kelantan	55	(8)
Total		183	(36)

Managerial career
- 2011: Kelantan FA President's Cup Team
- 2012–2015: Kelantan (assistant head coach)
- 2015: Kelantan (caretaker)
- 2015–2016: MOF
- 2016–2017: Kelantan
- 2019–: Kelantan United (head coach)
- * Club domestic league appearances and goals as of 14 November 2004

Zahasmi Bin Ismail (born 9 November 1961) is a Malaysian former footballer and currently the head coach of Malaysia Premier League side, Kelantan United.

== Career as a player ==
Zahasmi began his football career in 1986 playing for his hometown team, Kelantan FA. He mainly played as a central defender. He spent playing for the team until 1994 before he signed for a two-year contract with Terengganu FA in 1995 and 1996. Zahasmi return to Kelantan in 1997 and played for 3 seasons for the team before playing for JKR Kelantan in 2000. He retired as a footballer in 2004 last played for, JKR Kelantan.

=== Controversial issues ===
On 18 June 1994, Zahasmi was involved with an incident after assaulting Selangor FA forward, Zsolt Bücs, during the Premier League match held in Merdeka Stadium. He later was banned from playing for 6-months after being found guilty in the incident.

== Coaching career ==
Zahasmi coaching career started in 2011 as head coach for Kelantan's youth team. He has brought the team to become King's Gold Cup champion and Malaysian President's Cup champion in 2011. Later in 2012, he was then appointed as assistant coach of Kelantan FA senior team with Bojan Hodak as head coach.

On 20 December 2015, he was appointed as head coach of Malaysia third tier league club, MOF F.C. playing for Malaysia FAM League. MOF finished second in the Group B league table.

On 30 November 2016, Zahasmi was appointed the successor of Velizar Popov at Kelantan FA becoming new head coach for 2017 season. His experience with Kelantan football in being crucial in making him the new head coach for the team. He also took over as the interim head coach of the club in 2015 when Azraai Khor left the head coach position.

== Managerial statistics ==
As of 9 September 2017.

Team	Nat	From	To	Competition	Record							
Team	Nat	From	To	Competition	G	W	D	L	GF	GA	GD	Win %
Kelantan FA (caretaker)	Malaysia	4 July 2015	5 December 2015	Liga Super	11	5	2	4	23	21	+2	45.45
Kelantan FA (caretaker)	Malaysia	4 July 2015	5 December 2015	Piala Malaysia	1	0	0	1	0	3	−3	0.00
MOF F.C.	Malaysia	5 December 2015	31 December 2016	Liga FAM	16	9	4	3	26	14	+12	56.25
MOF F.C.	Malaysia	5 December 2015	31 December 2016	Piala FA	1	0	0	1	0	3	−3	0.00
Kelantan FA	Malaysia	30 November 2016	Present	Liga Super	22	7	4	11	31	39	−8	31.82
Kelantan FA	Malaysia	30 November 2016	Present	Piala FA	1	0	1	0	1	1	+0	0.00
Kelantan FA	Malaysia	30 November 2016	Present	Piala Malaysia	6	2	0	4	8	12	−4	33.33
				Total	58	23	11	24	90	91	−1	39.66
