= Alessandro Celin =

Brazilian-Italian footballer (born 1989)

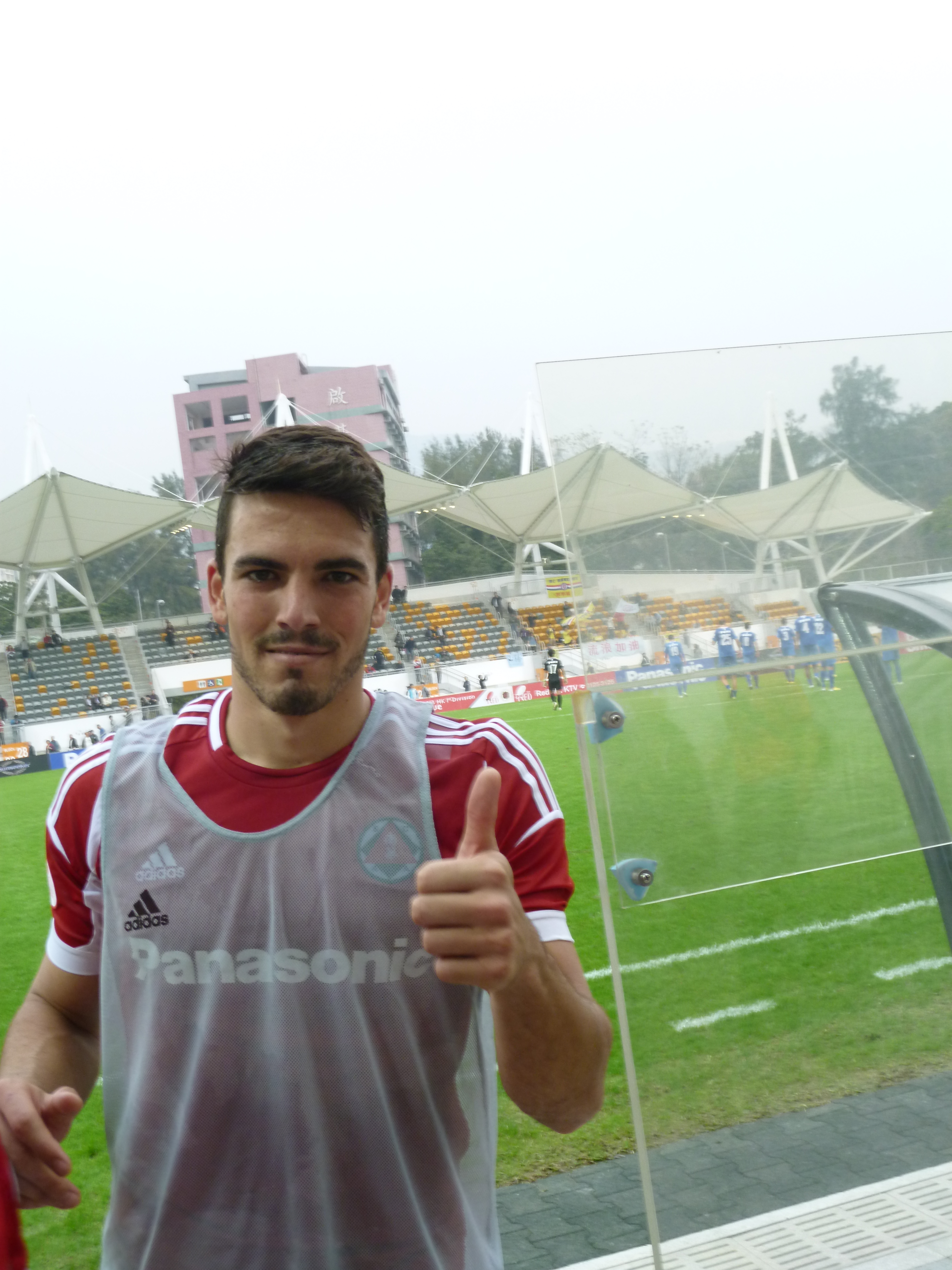

Personal information
- Full name: Alessandro Padovani Celin
- Date of birth: September 11, 1989 (age 37)
- Place of birth: Castelo, Espírito Santo, Brazil
- Height: 1.90 m (6 ft 3 in)
- Position: Forward

Team information
- Current team: Arzachena

Youth career
- Atlético Mineiro

Senior career*
Years	Team	Apps	(Gls)
2010	Profute - RJ	15	(9)
2011	ASA	1	(0)
2011	Gwangju FC	1	(0)
2012	Rio Branco	9	(5)
2012–2013	South China	9	(3)
2013–2014	Volyn Lutsk	16	(4)
2015	Juve Stabia	5	(0)
2016	Concordia Chiajna	6	(0)
2017	Kelantan	13	(4)
2019	Saif	12	(5)
2019–	Arzachena	9	(1)
- * Club domestic league appearances and goals as of 23:44, 4 March 2020 (UTC)

Alessandro Padovani Celin (Chinese: 沙恩; Hangul: 셀린; born 11 September 1989 in Castelo, Espírito Santo, Brazil) is a Brazilian-Italian footballer who plays as a forward for Italian Serie D club Arzachena.

== Club career ==
=== Atletico Mineiro (Academy) ===
Alessandro Celin started his steps in the youth team of Clube Atletico Mineiro when he was 14 years old.

=== Agremiação Sportiva Arapiraquense ===
Celin began his club career at ASA. He had played for the team in a number of matches in Campeonato Alagoano, a football league of the state of Alagoas and was Champion of Algoas Championship in 2011. He made his debut, as well as the only match, in Campeonato Brasileiro Série B in 2011.

=== Gwangju FC ===
Celin joined K-League club Gwangju FC on 27 July 2011. He made his debut for Gwangju FC playing against Busan IPark on 25 September 2011.

=== Trials with other clubs ===
After he played for Gwangju FC, he went for trials with different clubs, including Premier League club Fulham and West Ham United. However, the trials were not a success and he remained a free agent.

=== South China ===
After Trials in England he ended up joining South China. On 29 December 2012, Steven Lo, the chairman of South China, announced that the club signed Celin. He went on playing 14 games and scoring 4 goals. He was one of the winning players in Hong Kong First Division League season 2012–13.

=== Volyn Lutsk ===
On 18 October 2013, Celin joined Ukrainian Premier League club Volyn Lutsk.

=== Kelantan ===
On 20 January 2017, he signed for Kelantan FA (Malaysian Super League) to replace their previous import player, Okiki Afolabi who was sent home after failed the club medical test with him had an ACL (anterior cruciate ligament) injury. On 6 May, he scored his first goal with a bicycle kick in a 3–2 win against Pahang.

== Malaysia Super League career statistics ==
Club	Season	Super League		FA Cup		League Cup		Others		Total
Club	Season	App	Goals	App	Goals	App	Goals	App	Goals	App	Goals
Kelantan FA (Malaysia Super League)	2017	13	4	1	0	5	0	–	–	19	4
Kelantan FA (Malaysia Super League)	Club Total	13	4	1	0	5	0	–	–	19	4
Career totals		13	4	1	0	5	0	–	–	19	4
Last updated 28 October 2017

== Honours ==
ASA

- Campeonato Alagoano: 2011

South China

- Hong Kong First Division League: 2012–13
