= Rozaimi Azwar =

Malaysian footballer

Personal information
- Full name: Mohammad Rozaimi Azwar bin Mat Noor
- Date of birth: 24 January 1993 (age 33)
- Place of birth: Rantau Panjang, Kelantan, Malaysia
- Height: 1.60 m (5 ft 3 in)
- Position: Midfielder

Team information
- Current team: Kelantan United
- Number: 7

Youth career
- 2012: Perlis U21
- 2013–2014: Kelantan U21

Senior career*
Years	Team	Apps	(Gls)
2015–2018	Kelantan	7	(0)
2015	→ Sabah (loan)	3	(0)
2016	→ MOF FC (loan)	6	(0)
2019–2020	Kelantan United	29	(1)
- * Club domestic league appearances and goals as of 17 March 2019

Mohammad Rozaimi Azwar bin Mat Noor (born 23 January 1993) is a Malaysian professional footballer. Rozaimi plays mainly as a central midfielder but can also play as an attacking midfielder.

== Club career ==
Born and raised in Rantau Panjang located near the Malaysia-Thailand border state of Kelantan, Rozaimi began his career with Perlis U-21 in 2012. In 2013, Rozaimi joined Kelantan U-21 and was part of the team that won 2013 Malaysia President's Cup. He was selected as man of the match in the final after scoring the winning goal for his side against Perak U-21 at Sultan Muhammad IV Stadium on 12 October 2013.

After showing a good performances with the Kelantan's youth team, he was called by the head coach at that time, George Boateng to train with the first team for 2014 Malaysia Cup campaign. In 2015, Rozaimi has been promoted to the Kelantan's first team for 2015 Malaysia Super League campaign but did not make any appearances.

In May 2015, Rozaimi was loaned to Malaysia Premier League side Sabah until end of the 2015 season.

After returned from Sabah at the end of the 2015 season, Rozaimi signed one-year loan deal with Putrajaya based club, MOF FC and made his debut in 2–2 draw against KDMM on 11 May 2016. He made 6 appearances for MOF FC before returned to Kelantan at the end of the season.

On 8 April 2017, Rozaimi made his league debut for Kelantan in 1–2 defeat against Pahang in Sultan Muhammad IV Stadium.

He was released by Kelantan in April 2018.

== Career statistics ==
=== Club ===
As of 9 September 2017.

Appearances and goals by club, season and competition
Club	Season	League			Cup		League Cup		Continental		Total	
Club	Season	Division	Apps	Goals	Apps	Goals	Apps	Goals	Apps	Goals	Apps	Goals
Kelantan	2015	Malaysia Super League	0	0	0	0	0	0	–		0	0
Kelantan	2017	Malaysia Super League	7	0	0	0	4	0	–		11	0
Kelantan	2018	Malaysia Super League	0	0	0	0	0	0	–		0	0
Kelantan	Total		7	0	0	0	4	0	–	–	11	0
Sabah (loan)	2015	Malaysia Premier League	3	0	0	0	0	0	–		3	0
Sabah (loan)	Total		3	0	0	0	0	0	–	–	3	0
MOF FC (loan)	2016	Malaysia FAM League	6	0	0	0	–		–		6	0
MOF FC (loan)	Total		6	0	0	0	0	0	–	–	6	0
Career Total			16	0	0	0	4	0	–	–	20	0

== Honours ==
=== Club ===
Kelantan U21

- Malaysia President Cup: 2013

== Personal life ==
Rozaimi had a road accident during Chinese New Year celebration in 2011 and had to rest for a year after he broke his leg. He is the youngest son from eight siblings.
