= Velizar Popov =

Bulgarian football manager (born 1976)

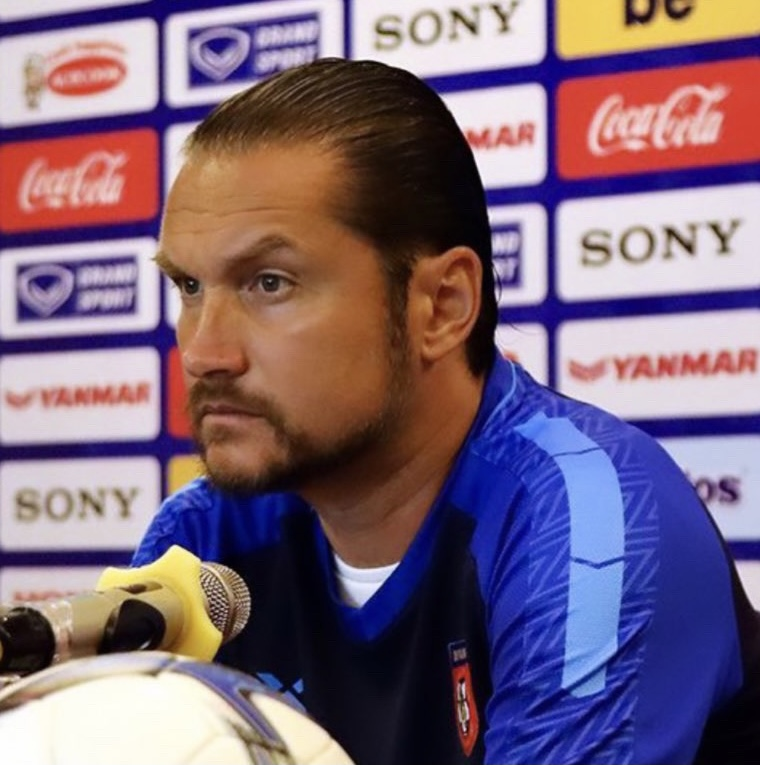
- Popov in 2021

Personal information
- Full name: Velizar Emilov Popov
- Date of birth: 7 February 1976 (age 50)
- Place of birth: Plovdiv, PR Bulgaria
- Height: 1.84 m (6 ft 0 in)
- Positions: Defensive midfielder; defender

Youth career
- 1982–1994: Lokomotiv Plovdiv

Senior career*
Years	Team	Apps	(Gls)
1995–1996	Lokomotiv Plovdiv		
1996–1999	Hebar Pazardzhik		
1999–2000	Spartak Plovdiv		

Managerial career
- 1999–2002: Spartak Plovdiv (Youth Academy)
- 2002–2007: Cherno More (Youth Academy)
- 2007–2009: Cherno More (assistant coach)
- 2009–2010: Cherno More
- 2010–2011: FC Liberika
- 2011–2012: Costuleni
- 2012–2013: New Radiant SC
- 2013–2014: Sur SC
- 2014: Suphanburi
- 2015: Maldives
- 2016: Kelantan
- 2017: Sisaket
- 2018: Sur SC
- 2019–2022: Myanmar U23
- 2022–2025: Đông Á Thanh Hóa
- 2025–2026: Thể Công-Viettel
- * Club domestic league appearances and goals

Velizar Emilov Popov (Bulgarian: Велизар Емилов Попов; born 7 February 1976) is a Bulgarian former professional player and manager. Popov played for Lokomotiv Plovdiv, Hebar Pazardzhik and Spartak Plovdiv.

Popov has managed 11 different teams in 8 different countries, including 2 national teams. His management style emphasizes an aggressive, high-intensity approach. Popov has worked in the Bulgarian Premier League in 2007–2010, Denmark Series in 2011, Moldova Premier League in 2011–2012, Maldives Premier League in 2013, Thailand Premier League in 2014 and 2017, Malaysian Super League in 2016, Oman Premier League in 2013–2014 and 2018, and Vietnam League 1 in 2022–2025, and also has managed 2 national teams – Maldives in 2015 and Myanmar Olympic in 2019–2022. In 2013 Popov became the first Bulgarian coach to win a treble abroad with a 100 percent winning record, reaching the quarter-finals in AFC Cup. In 2019, Popov's Myanmar won the group stage and the bronze medal at the South East Asian Games. In 2023, Popov led Thanh Hoa FC to the Vietnamese National Cup and Vietnamese Super Cup for the first time in club history. In 2024 Thanh Hoa FC and Popov won again back to back Vietnam National Cup for the second consecutive year becoming the most successful team in the history of the club with three trophies in two seasons.In 2026 passed the impressive quota of 100 official matches in Vietnamese football leading Thể Công – Viettel FC to silver medals and participation in the AFC Champions league 2 as runner-up with a record number of points in a single campaign, the best defense in the league with most clean sheets and 38 consecutive official matches in which the team always scored a goal since he is in charge, records in the history of Thể Công – Viettel FC. Popov has coached for over 25 years in Europe, Asia and the Middle East.

== Coaching career ==
=== Cherno More ===
On 16 September 2009, Popov became the manager of Cherno More Varna, succeeding Nikola Spasov. He made his managerial debut in the Bulgarian A PFG on 20 September against Minyor Pernik. He led Cherno More in 36 league appearances and three Bulgarian Cup matches. In December 2009, Cherno More defeated Levski Sofia 4–1 in the Bulgarian Cup. In June 2010, Popov brought Mário Jardel to the team.

In October 2010, Popov moved to Danish side Liberika Horsens, which was promoted in 2011. For the 2011–2012 season, Popov managed Moldovan FC Costuleni in the Premier League Moldova.

=== New Radiant ===
In January 2013, Popov managed New Radiant to its third Maldivian championship. The team also won the Maldives FA Cup and the Supercup Milo Charity Shield. New Radiant finished with 57 points, surpassing the league record of 53 set by VB Sports in 2010. New Radiant won all 19 matches, scoring 73 goals and conceding 5 goals.

In the Asian AFC Cup, New Radiant achieved notable results. The team won 7–0 against Indonesian team Persib. New Radiant finished on the top of the group stage with 20 goals scored and 4 conceded in 6 games. The club won the group with 15 points in 6 games and qualified for the quarterfinals, where they beat Selangor from Malaysia 2–0 after extra time. Popov received the 2013 Maldives Haveeru Awards - Best Coach of the year award and The Special Excellence Award of New Radiant SC.

=== Sur Sport Club ===
On 7 October 2013, Popov moved to Omani club Sur Sports Club, signing a one-year contract until the end of the 2013/14 season. Popov's debut match in the Omani League was against local rivals Al-Oruba, which Sur won 3–0. In 3 months, Sur Club moved from 10th to 3rd position in the standings.

=== Suphanburi F.C. ===
For the 2014 season, Popov became the manager of Suphanburi F.C. of the Thai Premier League. The team finished 6th out of 20 teams in the final league table and reached the semi-final of the FA Cup for the first time.

=== Maldives national football team ===
In January 2015, Popov became the manager of Maldives national team. This was his first role managing a national team.

In the World Cup qualifiers against Qatar, Qatar scored the only goal of the match in added time. In the Indian Ocean Islands Games, Maldives won their first match in this competition after 3 participations, beating Seychelles 2–1. On 12 August 2015, Popov resigned as the Maldives national football team coach.

=== Kelantan FA ===
On 12 May 2016, Kelantan FA appointed Popov as the manager of their Super League team until the end of the 2016 season. At the time of his appointment, Kelantan was in sixth place in the Super League standings with 12 points. Popov's debut as Kelantan head coach was a 0–0 draw against Selangor on 18 May in Shah Alam stadium. On 15 July, Kelantan won an away match against Terengganu 6–1. Under Popov's management, Kelantan qualified for that year's Malaysia Cup quarter-finals after three wins and one draw in their first four group stage matches.

On 27 September 2016, Kelantan FA (KAFA) chairman Tan Sri Annuar Musa announced that Popov had been offered a contract extension for the 2017 season. On 23 October 2016, it was announced that Popov had declined the contract extension for the 2017 season, citing personal reasons. During Popov's tenure, Kelantan won eight, drew six, and lost five matches in all competitions. The team finished fourth in the league.

=== Sisaket FC ===
In March 2017, Popov became the manager of Sisaket FC in the Thai Premier League. At the time of his appointment, Sisaket FC had won one match and lost five, with a total of three points. By the end of the first half of the season, Sisaket had won 15 points and moved out of the relegation zone. Popov resigned from Sisaket FC in August 2017.

=== Sur Sport Club ===
In 2018, Popov became the head coach of Sur Sport Club in Oman, which had recently returned to the Oman Professional Premier League. Under his management, Sur SC moved from the 10th to 3rd position in the standings.

=== Myanmar U-23 National Team ===
In January 2019, Popov was appointed as head coach of the Myanmar National Football Olympic Team U-23 for the 2019 AFC Olympic Qualifiers, AFF Championship in Cambodia and SEA Games in Philippines.

In the AFC qualifiers, Myanmar beat Timor Leste 7–0. The team entered the semifinals in the 2019 SEA Games after winning against the host Philippines 2–1, Timor Leste 3–1, Cambodia 2–1 and drawing with Malaysia 1–1. Myanmar claimed the men's football bronze medal at SEA Games 2019 after beating Cambodia 5–4 on penalties following a 2–2 draw at the Rizal Memorial Stadium in the 3rd place match. In December 2020, the Myanmar Football Federation proposed a new contract to Popov. The agreement of his contract extension was reached till the end of the 2021 SEA Games.

=== Dong A Thanh Hoa ===
On 1 December 2022, after four years as head coach of the Myanmar Olympic national team, Popov became the head coach of Dong A Thanh Hoa in Vietnam League 1.

Under Popov's leadership, the team had 6 wins and 4 draws in the first 10 games. This performance led the team to the top of the table in 5 rounds in a row and achieved the club's main target of entering the top 8 three games before the end of the regular season.

Under Popov's guidance, the team won the National Cup of Vietnam and the Vietnamese Super Cup in 2023, marking the first time the club had won a double. The team also finished the 2023 season in the top 4 and was the only team that remained undefeated in away games during the whole season.

Popov ended his contract in early March 2025, leaving the team in third place in the league standings after only two defeats in 15 games and three historic trophies.

=== Thể Công–Viettel FC ===
In April 2025, Popov was unveiled as the head coach of Thể Công–Viettel FC, signing a contract until the end of the 2026–2027 season. Under his leadership, Thể Công–Viettel FC won the silver medals by finishing second in the final standings of the Vietnam League 1 in the 2025-2026 season and qualifying for AFC Champions League 2 2026-2027. This is also the team's best ranking in the last 6 years, earning a club-record 54 points in a season of 26 matches, with the highest ever for the club 2.08 points per game rating. Thể Công–Viettel FC also finished the season with the best defense in the league, conceding 21 goals in 26 matches with a record 12 clean sheets. Another remarkable record for the club is that after Popov's arrival at the helm, the team managed to always score a goal in every official match, 38 in a row, an absolute record in the club's history.

== Managerial statistics ==
As of match played 4 September 2026

Team	Nat	From	To	Record							
Team	Nat	From	To	G	W	D	L	GF	GA	GD	Win %
PFC Cherno More Varna	(Bulgaria)	16 September 2009	29 October 2010	38	17	9	12	49	44	+5	44.74
FC Costuleni	(Moldova)	1 June 2011	31 December 2012	33	13	11	9	48	48	+0	39.39
New Radiant SC	(Maldives)	10 January 2013	31 August 2013	32	29	0	3	104	22	+82	90.63
Sur Club	(Oman)	1 September 2013 / 1 June 2018	28 April 2014 / 31 December 2018	40	18	11	11	66	49	+17	45.00
Suphanburi FC	(Thailand)	11 May 2014	31 December 2015	29	15	4	10	42	38	+4	51.72
Sisaket FC	(Thailand)	13 March 2017	31 July 2017	21	6	5	10	32	41	−9	28.57
Maldives	(Maldives)	28 January 2015	12 August 2015	2	0	0	2	0	3	−3	0.00
Maldives	(Maldives)	28 January 2015	12 August 2015	2	1	0	1	5	5	+0	50.00
Kelantan FA	(Malaysia)	13 May 2016	23 October 2016	19	8	6	5	29	25	+4	42.11
Myanmar U22	(Myanmar)	1 January 2019	30 November 2022	5	3	0	2	12	8	+4	60.00
Myanmar U23	(Myanmar)	1 January 2019	30 November 2022	10	6	1	3	24	22	+2	60.00
Myanmar U23	(Myanmar)	1 January 2019	30 November 2022	9	4	3	2	20	13	+7	44.44
Thanh Hóa	(Vietnam)	1 December 2022	5 March 2025	76	33	25	18	123	101	+22	43.42
Thể Công-Viettel	(Vietnam)	27 April 2025	31 October 2026	38	22	11	5	66	40	+26	57.89
Total				325	162	82	81	579	396	+183	49.85
