= 2018 Johor Darul Ta'zim F.C. season =

Johor Darul Ta'zim
2018 season
- President: Tunku Tun Aminah Sultan Ibrahim
- Head Coach: Ulisses Morais (until 25 February); Raúl Longhi (from 26 February)
- Stadium: Larkin Stadium
- Super League: 1st
- Charity Shield: Winners
- FA Cup: Quarter-finals
- Malaysia Cup: Semi-finals
- Champions League play-off: Preliminary round 2
- AFC Cup: Group stage
- Top goalscorer: League: Gonzalo Cabrera (9); All: Safawi Rasid (16)
- Highest home attendance: 23,030 vs Kedah (3 February 2018)
- Lowest home attendance: 5,170 vs Sông Lam Nghệ An (24 April 2018)
- Biggest win: 5–0 vs Kedah (H), 10 August 2018, Malaysia Cup
- Biggest defeat: 0–4 vs Persija Jakarta (A), 10 April 2018, AFC Cup
Home colours	Away colours	Third colours

The 2018 season is Johor Darul Ta'zim Football Club's 45th season in club history and 6th season in the Malaysia Super League after rebranding their name from Johor FC.

== Season overview ==
The 2018 season was consistent one for Johor Darul Ta'zim, as the club won a fifth consecutive Malaysia Super League title, becoming the first Malaysian club to win the league five times in a row, though they fell short in both domestic cup competitions.

=== Super League ===
JDT began their Malaysia Super League campaign on 3 February and concluded it on 28 July, finishing as champions with 59 points from 22 matches, recording 19 wins, 2 draws, and 1 defeat, with 47 goals scored and 19 conceded for a goal difference of +28. The title was JDT's fifth consecutive Malaysia Super League crown, making them the first Malaysian club to win the league five seasons in a row (2014–2018). JDT finished comfortably ahead of second-placed Perak and third-placed Pahang, underlining their continued dominance at the top of Malaysian football.

=== FA Cup ===
In contrast to their league success, JDT's Malaysia FA Cup campaign ended in disappointment in the quarter-finals. After progressing through the early rounds, JDT faced Pahang and were eliminated 0–3 on aggregate on 20 April 2018, failing to advance to the semi-finals. Pahang's 3–0 win in the second leg at the Larkin Stadium ended JDT's hopes of retaining the FA Cup title they had won in 2016.

=== Malaysia Cup ===
The Malaysia Cup offered JDT a chance to defend the title they had won for the first time in 2017, and the team progressed through the group stage, topping their group with 3 wins, 0 draws, and 3 defeats from 6 matches, scoring 11 goals and conceding 7. However, their title defence ended in the semi-finals, where they were eliminated by Terengganu 2–3 on aggregate, with the second leg played at the Larkin Stadium on 20 October 2018. The semi-final exit meant JDT were unable to complete a league-and-cup double for the second consecutive season.

=== AFC Cup ===
JDT entered the AFC Cup in Group H alongside Indonesian side Persija Jakarta, Vietnamese club Sông Lam Nghệ An, and Singaporean side Tampines Rovers. JDT got off to a strong start, defeating Persija Jakarta 3–0 at home in February to set the early pace in the group. However, their campaign faltered mid-way through the group stage, including a heavy 4–0 defeat away to Persija Jakarta. Despite a 3–2 win over Sông Lam Nghệ An in their final group match on 24 April, secured by a second-half penalty from Safiq Rahim, JDT finished third in Group H with 10 points from 6 matches, recording 3 wins, 1 draw, and 2 defeats, with 8 goals scored and 9 conceded for a goal difference of −1. As a result, JDT were eliminated at the group stage, failing to advance to the knockout rounds for the first time since their 2015 triumph.

== Friendly matches ==
Win Draw Loss

30 December 2017	Johor Darul Ta'zim (Malaysia)	5–0	(Malaysia) JDT II	Johor Bahru, Johor
17:00				Stadium: Tan Sri Dato' Hj Hassan Yunos Stadium

5 January 2018	Johor Darul Ta'zim (Malaysia)	2–0	(Malaysia) Terengganu II	Johor Bahru, Johor
17:00	Aidil Zafuan 68'; Safiq Rahim (penalty scored) 79'			Stadium: Tan Sri Dato' Hj Hassan Yunos Stadium

7 January 2018	Johor Darul Ta'zim (Malaysia)	4–0	(Indonesia) Mitra Kukar	Johor Bahru, Johor
21:00	Luciano Figueroa (penalty scored) 17' 45+1'; Safiq Rahim 42'; Bruno Soares 47'			Stadium: Tan Sri Dato' Hj Hassan Yunos Stadium

=== Thailand Pre-season Tour 2018 ===
Win Draw Loss

10 January 2018 1	Army United (Thailand)	0–1	(Malaysia) Johor Darul Ta'zim	Bangkok
19:30			Luciano Figueroa 51'	Stadium: Thai Army Sports Stadium

13 January 2018 2	Chonburi (Thailand)	1–1	(Malaysia) Johor Darul Ta'zim	Chonburi
	Marclei Santos 50'		Jorge Pereyra Díaz 55'	Stadium: Chonburi Stadium

15 January 2018 3	Port (Thailand)	1–0	(Malaysia) Johor Darul Ta'zim	Bangkok
	Dragan Bošković 51'			Stadium: PAT Stadium

== Competition ==
=== Overview ===
Competition	First match	Last match	Starting round	Final position	Record							
Competition	First match	Last match	Starting round	Final position	Pld	W	D	L	GF	GA	GD	Win %
Malaysia Super League (Note: Includes the Charity Shield.)	3 February 2018	28 July 2018	Matchday 1	Winners	22	19	2	1	47	9	+38	86.36
Malaysia FA Cup	3 March 2018	20 April 2018	Second round	Quarter-finals	4	2	1	1	5	6	−1	50.00
Malaysia Cup	5 August 2018	20 October 2018	Group stage	Semi-finals	10	4	2	4	16	11	+5	40.00
AFC Champions League	23 January 2018		Preliminary round 2	Preliminary round 2	1	0	0	1	2	5	−3	0.00
AFC Cup	14 February 2018	24 April 2018	Group stage	Group stage	6	3	1	2	8	9	−1	50.00
Total					43	28	6	9	78	40	+38	65.12

Last updated: 20 October 2018
Source: Competitions

=== Malaysia Super League ===
==== Table ====
Pos	Team	Pld	W	D	L	GF	GA	GD	Pts	Qualification or relegation
1	Johor Darul Ta'zim (C)	22	19	2	1	47	9	+38	59	Qualification for the AFC Champions League group stage
2	Perak	22	10	6	6	35	27	+8	36	Qualification for the AFC Champions League second preliminary round
3	PKNS	22	10	5	7	37	29	+8	35	
4	Pahang	22	9	7	6	35	21	+14	34	
5	Terengganu	22	10	4	8	32	31	+1	34	

Source: FAM, FMLLP
Rules for classification: 1) Points; 2) Goal difference; 3) Number of goals scored.
(C) Champions

==== Results summary ====
Overall								Home						Away					
Pld	W	D	L	GF	GA	GD	Pts	W	D	L	GF	GA	GD	W	D	L	GF	GA	GD
22	19	2	1	47	9	+38	59	11	0	0	26	1	+25	8	2	1	21	8	+13

Source: Super League fixtures and results

==== Malaysia Super League fixtures and results ====
Win Draw Loss

3 February 2018 1 / Charity Shield	Johor Darul Ta'zim	2–1	Kedah	Johor Bahru, Johor
21:00 UTC+8	Luciano Figueroa 29' (substituted off) 86'; Marcos Antonio 58' (substituted off) 75'; Gary Steven Robbat (substituted on) 75'; Gonzalo Cabrera (substituted off) 81'; Ahmad Hazwan Bakri (substituted on) 81'; Safawi Rasid (substituted on) 86'		Pablo Pallarès 15'; Ariff Farhan Isa (yellow card) 22'; Hidhir Idris (substituted off) 46'; Amirul Hisyam (substituted on) 46'; Sandro da Silva (yellow card) 56'; Syazwan Zainon (substituted off) 72'; Farhan Roslan (substituted on) 72'	Stadium: Tan Sri Dato Haji Hassan Yunos Stadium; Attendance: 23,030; Referee: Mohd Zohri Tajuddin

6 February 2018 2	Johor Darul Ta'zim	3–0	(Perak) PKNP	Johor Bahru, Johor
21:00 UTC+8	Jorge Pereyra Díaz 44'; Fadhli Shas 58'; Ahmad Hazwan Bakri (substituted off) 59'; Gonzalo Cabrera (substituted on) 59'; Safiq Rahim (substituted off) 80'; Mohd Afiq Fazail (substituted on) 80'; Luciano Figueroa (substituted off) 80'; Safawi Rasid (substituted on) 80'; Natxo Insa 90+2'		Yeon Gi-Sung (yellow card) 44'; Vikneswaran Sarkunan (substituted off) 46'; S. Deevan Raj (substituted on) 46'; Muhammad Mohd Safar (substituted off) 63'; Ezanie Mat Salleh (substituted on) 63'; Hafiz Ramdan (substituted off) 66'; Amirul Waie (substituted on) 66'	Stadium: Tan Sri Dato Haji Hassan Yunos Stadium; Attendance: 14,160; Referee: Razlan Joffri Ali

10 February 2018 3	Kuala Lumpur	1–0	Johor Darul Ta'zim	Cheras, Kuala Lumpur
21:00 UTC+8	Indra Putra Mahayuddin (yellow card) 13'; Kamarul Effandi (yellow card) 67'; Paulo Josué 45+1' (yellow card) 90+3'		Hariss Harun (yellow card) 39'; Marcos Antonio (substituted off) 40'; Adam Nor Azlin (substituted on) 40' (substituted off) 57'; Safawi Rasid (substituted on) 57'; Gonzalo Cabrera (substituted off) 90'; Ahmad Hazwan Bakri (substituted on) 90'	Stadium: KLFA Stadium; Referee: Wan Mohamad Tarmizi Wan Ibrahim

24 February 2018 4	Johor Darul Ta'zim	3–0	(Malacca) Melaka United	Johor Bahru, Johor
21:00 UTC+8	Fadhli Shas (yellow card) 4'; Luciano Figueroa 12'; Safiq Rahim (yellow card) 20' (substituted off) 60'; Jorge Pereyra Díaz 21'; Natxo Insa 34'; Hariss Harun (substituted on) 60'; Gonzalo Cabrera (substituted off) 73'; Safawi Rasid (substituted on) 73'; Mohd Azrif Nasrulhaq (substituted off) 75'; S. Kunanlan (substituted on) 75'		R. Surendran (yellow card) 22' (substituted off) 55'; Ahmad Fakri Saarani (yellow card) 29' (substituted off) 62'; Steven Thicot (yellow card) 47'; S. Sivanesan (substituted on) 55'; Mohd Azmi Muslim (substituted on) 62'; Khair Jones (substituted off) 85'; Farderin Kadir (substituted on) 85'	Stadium: Tan Sri Dato Haji Hassan Yunos Stadium; Attendance: 17,926; Referee: Suhaimi Mat Hassan

10 March 2018 5	Terengganu I	0–1	Johor Darul Ta'zim	Kuala Terengganu, Terengganu
21:00 UTC+8	Thierry Bin (yellow card) 15' (substituted off) 88'; Latiff Suhaimi (yellow card) 27'; Igor Zonjić (yellow card) 42'; Faiz Nasir (substituted off) 57'; Lee Jun-hyeob (substituted on) 57'; Malik Ariff (substituted off) 57'; Ashari Samsudin (substituted on) 57'; Wan Amirzafran (substituted on) 88'		Marcos Antonio 30'; Mohd Azrif Nasrulhaq (yellow card) 73' (substituted off) 79'; Darren Lok (substituted on) 79'; Gonzalo Cabrera (substituted off) 90+3'; Safawi Rasid (substituted on) 90+3'	Stadium: Sultan Ismail Nasiruddin Shah Stadium; Referee: Zulkarnain Zakaria

14 April 2018 6	Johor Darul Ta'zim	3–0	(Selangor) PKNS	Johor Bahru, Johor
21:00 UTC+8	Gonzalo Cabrera 14' 50' (substituted off) 90'; Mohd Azrif Nasrulhaq (yellow card) 32'; Hariss Harun (yellow card) 33'; Safawi Rasid 66'; Safawi Rasid (substituted off) 76'; S. Kunanlan (substituted on) 76'; Nazmi Faiz (substituted off) 82'; Safiq Rahim (substituted on) 82'; Darren Lok (substituted on) 90'		Romel Morales (yellow card) 35'; Khyril Muhymeen Zambri (substituted off) 61'; Safee Sali (substituted on) 61'; Faris Ramli (substituted off) 72'; Alif Haikal Sabri (substituted on) 72'; Jonathan Acosta (substituted off) 73'; K. Gurusamy (substituted on) 73'	Stadium: Tan Sri Dato Haji Hassan Yunos Stadium; Attendance: 8,310; Referee: Suhaizi Shukri

28 April 2018 7	Kelantan	1–2	Johor Darul Ta'zim	Kota Bharu, Kelantan
21:00 UTC+8	Mohammed Ghaddar 7'; Nik Azli Nik Alias (yellow card) 16'; Mohammed Ghaddar (substituted off) 46'; Shafiq Shaharudin (substituted on) 46'; Faris Shah Rosli (substituted off) 53'; Farisham Ismail (substituted on) 53'		Safiq Rahim (penalty scored) 38' (yellow card) 45' (substituted off) 55'; Nicolás Fernández (substituted on) 55'; Fadhli Shas (substituted off) 65'; Aidil Zafuan (substituted on) 65'; Ahmad Hazwan Bakri (substituted off) 75'; Syafiq Ahmad (substituted on) 75'; Natxo Insa 83'; Syafiq Ahmad (yellow card) 89'; Marcos Antonio (yellow card) 90+4'	Stadium: Sultan Muhammad IV Stadium; Referee: Zulkarnain Zakaria

2 May 2018 8	Johor Darul Ta'zim	2–0	Selangor	Johor Bahru, Johor
21:00 UTC+8	Natxo Insa (yellow card) 45+1' (substituted off) 75'; Ahmad Hazwan Bakri 61'; Nazmi Faiz 69' (substituted off) 86'; Mohd Afiq Fazail (substituted on) 75'; Safawi Rasid (yellow card) 82' (substituted off) 83'; S. Kunanlan (substituted on) 83'; Safiq Rahim (substituted on) 86'		A. Namathevan (yellow card) 31' (substituted off) 68'; D. Kugan (substituted off) 64'; Joseph Kalang Tie (substituted on) 64'; Amirul Haziq (substituted on) 68'; Halim Zainal (substituted off) 80'; Faizzudin Abidin (substituted on) 80'; Sean Selvaraj (yellow card) 90+2'	Stadium: Tan Sri Dato Haji Hassan Yunos Stadium; Attendance: 10,220; Referee: Suhaimi Mat Hassan

5 May 2018 9	Negeri Sembilan	0–4	Johor Darul Ta'zim	Paroi, Negeri Sembilan
21:00 UTC+8	Renārs Rode (substituted off) 8'; Kalaiharasan Letchumanan (substituted on) 8'; Fauzan Dzulkifli (yellow card) 13' (substituted off) 76'; Nicolás Vélez (substituted off) 38'; Fauzi Abdul Latif (substituted on) 38'; Aizulridzwan Razali (yellow card) 57'; Fakhrul Aiman Sidid (substituted on) 76'		Gonzalo Cabrera (penalty scored) 5'; La'Vere Corbin-Ong 37'; Ahmad Hazwan Bakri (substituted off) 45+1'; Syafiq Ahmad (substituted on) 45+1'; Mohd Afiq Fazail (yellow card) 53' (substituted off) 80'; Safawi Rasid (penalty scored) 63' 74' (substituted off) 78'; Safiq Rahim (substituted on) 78'; Gary Steven Robbat (substituted on) 80'	Stadium: Tuanku Abdul Rahman Stadium; Referee: Muhammad Nazmi Nasaruddin

12 May 2018 10	Selangor	2–2	Johor Darul Ta'zim	Cheras, Kuala Lumpur
21:00 UTC+8	Saiful Ridzuwan 14'; Rufino Segovia 16'; Willian Pacheco (yellow card) 57'; Joseph Kalang Tie (substituted off) 70'; Azizul Baharuddin (substituted on) 70'; Halim Zainal (substituted off) 78'; K. Sarkunan (substituted on) 78'; Ilham Armaiyn (substituted off) 81'; Mohd Amri Yahyah (substituted on) 81'		Gonzalo Cabrera 3'; S. Kunanlan (yellow card) 32'; Safawi Rasid (substituted off) 61'; Nazmi Faiz (substituted on) 61'; Harry Novillo 68' (substituted off) 89'; Mohd Afiq Fazail (substituted off) 84'; Ahmad Hazwan Bakri (substituted on) 84'; Mohd Azrif Nasrulhaq (substituted on) 89'	Stadium: KLFA Stadium; Referee: Suhaizi Shukri

23 May 2018 11	Johor Darul Ta'zim	2–0	Negeri Sembilan	Johor Bahru, Johor
22:00 UTC+8	Gonzalo Cabrera 33' 76'; Nazmi Faiz (substituted off) 70'; Safawi Rasid (substituted on) 70'; Marcos Antonio (substituted off) 71'; Fadhli Shas (substituted on) 72'; Harry Novillo (substituted off) 80'; Safiq Rahim (substituted on) 80'		Aiman Khalidi (yellow card) 17'; Mohd Nasriq Baharom (yellow card) 56'; Khairul Anwar (substituted off) 59'; N. Thanabalan (substituted on) 59'; Kim Do-heon (substituted off) 62'; Fauzan Dzulkifli (substituted on) 62'; Flávio Beck Júnior (substituted off) 68'; Faizal Abu Bakar (substituted on) 68'	Stadium: Tan Sri Dato Haji Hassan Yunos Stadium; Attendance: 6,670; Referee: Wan Mohamad Tarmizi Wan Ibrahim

27 May 2018 12	PKNS (Selangor)	0–0	Johor Darul Ta'zim	Shah Alam, Selangor
22:00 UTC+8	K. Gurusamy (yellow card) 55'; Qayyum Marjoni (yellow card) 59'; Nazrin Syamsul (substituted off) 61'; Safee Sali (substituted on) 61'; Jafri Firdaus (substituted off) 75'; M. Sivakumar (substituted on) 75'; Faris Ramli (substituted off) 79'; Faizat Ghazli (substituted on) 79'		Gary Steven Robbat (yellow card) 30' (substituted off) 89'; Harry Novillo (substituted off) 46'; Nazmi Faiz (substituted on) 46'; Safawi Rasid (yellow card) 55' (substituted off) 78'; Ahmad Hazwan Bakri (substituted on) 78'; Safiq Rahim (substituted on) 89'	Stadium: Shah Alam Stadium; Referee: Zulkarnain Zakaria

2 June 2018 13	Johor Darul Ta'zim	2–0	Perak	Johor Bahru, Johor
22:00 UTC+8	Fernando Márquez (penalty scored) 5' (substituted off) 57'; Ahmad Hazwan Bakri (yellow card) 44'; Safiq Rahim (substituted off) 46'; Gary Steven Robbat (substituted on) 46'; Mohd Azrif Nasrulhaq (substituted on) 57'; Nazmi Faiz (substituted off) 75'; Jorge Silva (substituted on) 75' (goal) 84'		Nor Hakim Hassan (substituted off) 64'; Khairil Anuar (substituted on) 64'; Wander Luiz (substituted off) 76'; Nizad Ayub (substituted on) 76'; Brendan Gan (yellow card) 77'; Leandro Dos Santos (substituted off) 83'; Nazrin Nawi (substituted on) 83'	Stadium: Tan Sri Dato Haji Hassan Yunos Stadium; Attendance: 9,710; Referee: Suhaimi Mat Hassan

8 June 2018 14	Johor Darul Ta'zim	1–0	Pahang	Johor Bahru, Johor
22:00 UTC+8	Bunyamin Omar 18' (o.g.); Fernando Márquez (yellow card) 22'; Safawi Rasid (substituted off) 61'; Ahmad Hazwan Bakri (substituted on) 61'; La'Vere Corbin-Ong (yellow card) 71'; Fernando Elizari (substituted off) 72'; Nazmi Faiz (substituted on) 72'; Gary Steven Robbat (substituted off) 77'; Natxo Insa (substituted on) 77'		Bunyamin Omar (yellow card) 3'; Safuwan Baharudin (yellow card) 12' (red card) 68'; Nor Azam Azih (yellow card) 20'; Wan Zaharulnizam (yellow card) 53' (substituted off) 67'; Faisal Halim (substituted on) 67'; Issey Nakajima-Farran (yellow card) 65' (substituted off) 68'; Mohamadou Sumareh (yellow card) 67'; Norshahrul Idlan Talaha (substituted on) 68'; Kogileswaran Raj (substituted off) 84'; Salomon Raj (substituted on) 84'	Stadium: Tan Sri Dato Haji Hassan Yunos Stadium; Attendance: 11,612; Referee: Nazmi Nasaruddin

12 June 2018 15	Pahang	1–2	Johor Darul Ta'zim	Kuantan, Pahang
22:00 UTC+8	Matthew Davies (yellow card) 23'; Wan Zaharulnizam (yellow card) 25'; R. Dinesh (yellow card) 41' (substituted off) 65'; Salomon Raj (substituted off) 46'; Zubir Azmi (substituted on) 46'; Faisal Halim (substituted on) 65'; Norshahrul Idlan Talaha (substituted off) 75'; Shahrul Nizam (substituted on) 75'; Issey Nakajima-Farran 86'; Helmi Eliza Elias (yellow card) 90'		Fernando Elizari (yellow card) 29'; Fernando Márquez 33' (substituted off) 85'; Safawi Rasid (substituted off) 61'; Ahmad Hazwan Bakri (substituted on) 61'; Syamer Kutty Abba (yellow card) 60' (substituted off) 61'; Mohd Afiq Fazail (substituted on) 61' (yellow card) 68'; Mohd Azrif Nasrulhaq (substituted on) 85'; Gonzalo Cabrera (penalty scored) 90+2'	Stadium: Darulmakmur Stadium; Referee: Suhaizi Shukri

20 June 2018 16	Johor Darul Ta'zim	2–0	Terengganu I	Johor Bahru, Johor
21:00 UTC+8	Marcos Antonio 8'; Gonzalo Cabrera 35'; Fernando Elizari (substituted off) 68'; Ahmad Hazwan Bakri (substituted on) 68'; Aidil Zafuan (red card) 72'; Fernando Márquez (substituted off) 77'; Fadhli Shas (substituted on) 77'; Safawi Rasid (substituted off) 82'; S. Kunanlan (substituted on) 82'		Lee Tuck (yellow card) 21'; Malik Ariff (substituted off) 31'; Faiz Nasir (substituted on) 31'; Thierry Bin (substituted off) 61'; Latiff Suhaimi (substituted on) 61'; Do Dong-hyun (substituted off) 81'; Malik Ariff (substituted on) 81'	Stadium: Tan Sri Dato Haji Hassan Yunos Stadium; Referee: Razlan Joffri Ali

26 June 2018 17	Melaka United (Malacca)	0–4	Johor Darul Ta'zim	Krubong, Malacca
21:00 UTC+8	S. Sivanesan (substituted off) 70'; S. Veenod (substituted on) 70'; Mohd Fauzi Roslan (substituted off) 75'; Mohd Azmi Muslim (substituted on) 75'; Yahor Zubovich (substituted off) 79'; Nurshamil Abd Ghani (substituted on) 79'		Fernando Márquez 41'; Fernando Elizari 54'; Syamer Kutty Abba (substituted off) 76'; Natxo Insa (substituted on) 76'; Safawi Rasid 64' (substituted off) 76'; Ahmad Hazwan Bakri (substituted on) 76'; Gonzalo Cabrera (substituted off) 80'; Nazmi Faiz (substituted on) 80' (goal) 90+1'; Fadhli Shas (yellow card) 85'	Stadium: Hang Jebat Stadium; Referee: Nazmi Nasaruddin

10 July 2018 18	Perak	1–2	Johor Darul Ta'zim	Ipoh, Perak
21:00 UTC+8	Amirul Azhan (substituted off) 35'; Idris Ahmad (substituted on) 35'; Leandro Dos Santos (yellow card) 54'; Nor Hakim Hassan 72'; Kenny Pallraj (substituted off) 80'; Khairil Anuar (substituted on) 80'; Nazirul Naim (substituted off) 86'; Nazrin Nawi (substituted on) 86'		Ahmad Hazwan Bakri (yellow card) 33' (substituted off) 70'; Syamer Kutty Abba (yellow card) 41' (substituted off) 54'; Natxo Insa (substituted on) 54' (yellow card) 90+2'; Safawi Rasid (substituted on) 70' (goal) 83' (yellow card) 84'; Hariss Harun 75'; Fernando Elizari (substituted off) 77'; Nazmi Faiz (substituted on) 77'	Stadium: Perak Stadium; Referee: Zulkarnain Zakaria

13 July 2018 19	Kedah	1–2	Johor Darul Ta'zim	Alor Setar, Kedah
21:00 UTC+8	Álvaro Silva (yellow card) 12'; Paulo Rangel (yellow card) 57' (penalty missed) 67' (red card) 79'; Andik Vermansyah (substituted off) 64'; Syazwan Zainon (substituted on) 64'; Rizal Ghazali (substituted off) 69'; Khairul Helmi (substituted on) 69'; Norfiqrie Talib (substituted off) 76'; Hidhir Idris (substituted on) 76'; Sandro da Silva (penalty scored) 79' (yellow card) 82'		Gonzalo Cabrera 22'; Hariss Harun (yellow card) 31'; Fernando Márquez 39'; La'Vere Corbin-Ong (yellow card) 54' (yellow-red card) 64'; Safawi Rasid (substituted off) 55'; Ahmad Hazwan Bakri (substituted on) 55'; Fernando Elizari (substituted off) 67'; Adam Nor Azlin (substituted on) 67'; Gonzalo Cabrera (substituted off) 90+4'; Nazmi Faiz (substituted on) 90+4'; Mohd Farizal Marlias (yellow card) 83'	Stadium: Darulaman Stadium; Referee: Mohd Amirul Izwan Yaacob

20 July 2018 20	Johor Darul Ta'zim	4–0	Kelantan	Johor Bahru, Johor
21:00 UTC+8	Fernando Elizari 51' (substituted off) 79'; Mohd Afiq Fazail 56'; Mohd Azrif Nasrulhaq (substituted off) 59'; Adam Nor Azlin (substituted on) 59'; Safiq Rahim (substituted on) 79' (penalty scored) 86'; Safawi Rasid 80'; Gonzalo Cabrera (substituted off) 84'; Kiko Insa (substituted on) 84'		Fakhrul Zaman (substituted off) 56'; Nik Akif Syahiran (substituted on) 56'; Danial Ashraf (substituted off) 60'; Nik Azli Nik Alias (substituted on) 60'; Shafiq Shaharudin (substituted off) 76'; Khairul Asyraf (substituted on) 76'	Stadium: Tan Sri Dato Haji Hassan Yunos Stadium; Referee: Wan Mohamad Tarmizi Wan Ibrahim

23 July 2018 21	PKNP (Perak)	1–2	Johor Darul Ta'zim	Ipoh, Perak
21:00 UTC+8	Franklin Anzité (yellow card) 39' (substituted off) 79'; Shukor Azmi (substituted off) 69'; Deevan Raj (substituted on) 69'; Farid Nezal (substituted off) 73'; Fandi Ahmad (substituted on) 73' (goal) 77'; Ridzuan Azly (substituted on) 79'		Natxo Insa (yellow card) 20'; Safiq Rahim (substituted off) 46'; Syafiq Ahmad (substituted on) 46' (goal) 75'; Fernando Márquez 73' (substituted off) 77'; Safawi Rasid (substituted on) 77'; Nazmi Faiz (substituted off) 84'; Gary Steven Robbat (substituted on) 84'	Stadium: Perak Stadium; Referee: Razlan Joffri Ali

28 July 2018 22	Johor Darul Ta'zim	2–0	Kuala Lumpur	Johor Bahru, Johor
21:00 UTC+8	Fernando Márquez 15' 48'; Gonzalo Cabrera (yellow card) 26'; Fadhli Shas (substituted off) 46'; Aidil Zafuan (substituted on) 46'; Mohd Afiq Fazail (substituted off) 75'; Nazmi Faiz (substituted on) 75'; Safawi Rasid (substituted off) 77'; Syafiq Ahmad (substituted on) 77'		Firdaus Faudzi (substituted off) 42'; Ashri Chuchu (substituted on) 42'; Zaquan Adha (yellow card) 49'; Irfan Zakaria (substituted off) 67'; Achmad Jufriyanto (substituted on) 67'; Hafiz Johar (yellow card) 74'; Paulo Josué (substituted off) 89'; Farid Ramli (substituted on) 89'	Stadium: Tan Sri Dato Haji Hassan Yunos Stadium; Referee: Suhaimi Mat Hassan

=== Malaysia FA Cup ===
Win Draw Loss

3 March 2018 Round 2	Sabah	1–2 (a.e.t.)	Johor Darul Ta'zim	Kota Kinabalu, Sabah
20:15 UTC+8	Lee Kil-Hoon 25'; Maxius Musa (yellow card) 41' (substituted off) 91'; Azzizan Nordin (yellow card) 48'; Sabri Sahar (substituted off) 72'; Jenius Karib (substituted off) 77'; Ummareng Bacok (substituted on) 77'; Rawilson Batuil (yellow card) 87'; Alto Linus (substituted on) 91'; Leopold Alphonso (substituted on) 72' (yellow card) 120+1'		Luciano Figueroa 52' (yellow card) 94'; Mohd Azrif Nasrulhaq (yellow card) 67' (substituted off) 68'; S. Kunanlan (substituted on) 68'; Ahmad Hazwan Bakri (substituted off) 74'; Safawi Rasid (substituted on) 74'; Natxo Insa (substituted off) 86'; Amirul Hadi Zainal (substituted on) 86'; Gonzalo Cabrera 94'; Marcos Antonio (yellow card) 116'; Hariss Harun (yellow card) 119'	Stadium: Likas Stadium; Referee: Mohd Zohri Tajuddin

17 March 2018 Round 3	UiTM (Selangor)	2–3	Johor Darul Ta'zim	Shah Alam, Selangor
20:15 UTC+8	Nursalam Zainal Abidin (yellow card) 34' (substituted off) 90+1'; Lucas Pugh 45+3'; Dao Bakary (substituted off) 63'; Mohd Yusri Abas (substituted on) 63'; Anwarul Hafiz Ahmad (substituted off) 86'; Sadam Hashim (substituted on) 86'; Faiz Bandong 90'; Asnan Awal (substituted on) 90+1'		Safawi Rasid 12' 41' 72'; Natxo Insa (substituted off) 77'; Nico Fernández (substituted on) 77'; Ahmad Hazwan Bakri (substituted off) 83'; Darren Lok (substituted on) 83'; Safiq Rahim (substituted off) 87'; Mohd Amirul Hadi Zainal (substituted on) 87'	Stadium: UiTM Stadium; Referee: Mohd Fairuzi Mat Desa

6 April 2018 Quarter Final 1st leg	Pahang	0–0	Johor Darul Ta'zim	Kuantan, Pahang
21:00 UTC+8	Safuwan Baharudin (yellow card) 22'; Faisal Abdul Halim (substituted off) 56'; Wan Zaharulnizam Zakaria (substituted on) 56'; Mohd Afif Amiruddin (yellow card) 85'		Safawi Rasid (substituted off) 84'; Nicolás Fernández (substituted on) 84'; Ahmad Hazwan Bakri (substituted off) 90+2'; Syafiq Ahmad (substituted on) 90+2'	Stadium: Darulmakmur Stadium; Referee: Zulkarnain Zakaria

20 April 2018 Quarter Final 2nd leg	Johor Darul Ta'zim	0–3 (0–3 agg.)	Pahang	Johor Bahru, Johor
21:00 UTC+8	La'Vere Corbin-Ong (yellow card) 52'; Fadhli Shas (substituted off) 70'; Safiq Rahim (substituted on) 70'; Mohd Azrif Nasrulhaq (substituted off) 90+6'; Nazmi Faiz (substituted off) 90+6'; Darren Lok (substituted on) 90+6'		Patrick Cruz 10' 59' 77'; Matthew Davies (substituted off) 76'; Mohd Bunyamin Omar (substituted on) 76'; Nor Azam Azih (yellow card) 77'; Kogileswaran Raj (substituted off) 79'; Wan Zaharulnizam Zakaria (substituted on) 79'; Mohamadou Sumareh (substituted off) 84'; Norshahrul Idlan Talaha (substituted on) 84'	Stadium: Tan Sri Dato Haji Hassan Yunos Stadium; Attendance: 17,320; Referee: Razlan Joffri Ali

=== Malaysia Cup ===
==== Group C ====
Pos	Team	Pld	W	D	L	GF	GA	GD	Pts	Qualification	JDT	KEL	MIFA	KED
1	Johor Darul Ta'zim	6	3	0	3	11	7	+4	9	Advance to knockout stage	—	1–0	1–2	5–1
2	Kelantan	6	2	2	2	3	3	0	8	Advance to knockout stage	1–0	—	0–0	2–0
3	MISC-MIFA	6	2	2	2	8	9	−1	8		0–3	2–0	—	2–2
4	Kedah	6	2	2	2	9	12	−3	8		3–1	0–0	3–2	—

Updated to match(es) played on 16 September 2018. Source: FAM FMLLP

5 August 2018 Matchday 1	Johor Darul Ta'zim	1–2	(Selangor) MISC-MIFA	Johor Bahru, Malaysia
21:00 UTC+8	Mohd Afiq Fazail (substituted off) 56'; Nazmi Faiz (substituted on) 56'; Fernando Márquez (penalty scored) 68'; Ahmad Hazwan Bakri (substituted off) 82'; Rozaimi Abdul Rahman (substituted on) 82'		Kpah Sherman 19'; K. Satish (yellow card) 38'; P. Rajesh (substituted off) 44'; G. Ganiesh (substituted on) 44'; Fakhrul Zaman (substituted off) 72'; Ivaan Hakimi (substituted on) 72'; Elizeu Melo (yellow card) 74'; Haziq Puad (substituted off) 76'; Syaiful Alias (substituted on) 76'; L'Imam Seydi (yellow card) 79'; R. Barath Kumar (substituted off) 81'; M. Thinaadkhran (substituted on) 81' (yellow card) 84'; Bae Beom-geun 83'; Khairul Rizam (substituted off) 87'; Haikal Nazri (substituted on) 87'	Stadium: Tan Sri Dato Haji Hassan Yunos Stadium

10 August 2018 Matchday 2	Johor Darul Ta'zim	5–1	Kedah	Johor Bahru, Malaysia
21:00 UTC+8	Fernando Márquez 13'; Natxo Insa 46'; Ahmad Hazwan Bakri (yellow card) 25' (goal) 72' (substituted off) 78'; S. Kunanlan (substituted on) 78' (goal) 90+1'; Gonzalo Cabrera 82' (substituted off) 87'; Syamer Kutty Abba (substituted on) 87'		Zafuan Azeman (substituted off) 31'; Hanif Dzahir (substituted on) 31'; Sandro da Silva 35'; Andik Vermansyah (substituted off) 52'; Syazwan Zainon (substituted on) 52'; Syawal Nordin (substituted off) 87'; Zulfahamzie Tarmizi (substituted on) 87'	Stadium: Tan Sri Dato Haji Hassan Yunos Stadium; Referee: Razlan Joffri Ali

17 August 2018 Matchday 3	Kelantan	1–0	Johor Darul Ta'zim	Kota Bharu, Malaysia
21:00 UTC+8	Danial Haqim (yellow card) 6' (red card) 90+3; Cristiano Santos (yellow card) 42' (goal) 45+2' (red card) 90+5'; Khairul Rizam (substituted off) 67'; Ivaan Hakimi (substituted on) 67'; Danial Ashraf (yellow card) 74'; Shahrul Nizam (yellow card) 76'; Imran Samso (substituted off) 78'; Shafiq Shaharudin (substituted on) 78'; Haziq Puad (yellow card) 83' (substituted off) 89'; Syaiful Alias (substituted on) 89'		Natxo Insa (yellow card) 16'; Nazmi Faiz (substituted off) 57'; Syamer Kutty Abba (substituted on) 57'; Mohd Azrif Nasrulhaq (substituted off) 88'; S. Kunanlan (substituted on) 88'; Ahmad Hazwan Bakri (substituted off) 90'; Darren Lok (substituted on) 90'; Marcos Antonio (yellow card) 90+1'; Gonzalo Cabrera (yellow card) 90+6'	Stadium: Sultan Muhammad IV Stadium; Referee: Suhaimi Mat Hassan

25 August 2018 Matchday 4	Johor Darul Ta'zim	1–0	Kelantan	Johor Bahru, Malaysia
21:00 UTC+8	Ahmad Hazwan Bakri (substituted off) 46'; Safiq Rahim (substituted on) 46'; Fernando Márquez 65' (yellow card) 66'; Mohd Azrif Nasrulhaq (substituted off) 73'; S. Kunanlan (substituted on) 73'; Gonzalo Cabrera (substituted off) 90'; Darren Lok (substituted on) 90'		Fakhrul Zaman (substituted off) 72'; Ivaan Hakimi (substituted on) 72'; Haziq Puad (substituted off) 76'; Syaiful Alias (substituted on) 76'; Khairul Rizam (substituted off) 87'; Haikal Nazri (substituted on) 87'	Stadium: Tan Sri Dato Haji Hassan Yunos Stadium; Referee: Zulkarnain Zakaria

31 August 2018 Matchday 5	Kedah	3–1	Johor Darul Ta'zim	Alor Setar, Malaysia
21:00 UTC+8	Sandro da Silva 6'; Syazwan Tajuddin (substituted off) 44'; Andik Vermansyah (substituted on) 44'; Akhyar Rashid 47' (substituted off) 74'; Syazwan Zainon (substituted on) 74'; Liridon Krasniqi (yellow card) 67' (goal) 90+4'; Abdul Halim Saari (substituted off) 84'; Amirul Hisyam (substituted on) 84'; Alvaro Silva (yellow card) 87'		Fernando Márquez 36' (yellow card) 85'; Gary Steven Robbat (yellow card) 45'; Safawi Rasid (substituted off) 73'; Ahmad Hazwan Bakri (substituted on) 73'; Gary Steven Robbat (substituted off) 73'; Syamer Kutty Abba (substituted on) 73'; Marcos Antonio (yellow card) 83' (red card) 90'; Gonzalo Cabrera (substituted off) 89'; Syafiq Ahmad (substituted on) 89'	Stadium: Darul Aman Stadium; Referee: Mohd Zohri Tajuddin

16 September 2018 Matchday 6	MISC-MIFA (Selangor)	0–3	Johor Darul Ta'zim	Shah Alam, Malaysia
21:00 UTC+8	G. Ganiesh (yellow card) 57' (substituted off) 78'; B. Tinagaran (yellow card) 63'; G. Mahathevan (substituted off) 73'; M. Thinaadkaran (substituted on) 73'; J. Satrunan Pillai (substituted on) 78'; K. Satish (substituted off) 84'; M. Yoges (substituted on) 84'		Gonzalo Cabrera (penalty scored) 63'; Fernando Márquez (substituted off) 65'; Ahmad Hazwan Bakri (substituted on) 65'; Safawi Rasid 73' (penalty scored) 83'; Natxo Insa (yellow card) 86'; Aidil Zafuan (substituted off) 87'; Kiko Insa (substituted on) 87'; Fernando Elizari (substituted off) 90+2'; Nazmi Faiz (substituted on) 90+2'	Stadium: Shah Alam Stadium; Referee: Zulkarnain Zakaria

==== Bracket ====
Quarter-finals
Terengganu	2	4	6
(Kuala Lumpur) Felda United	1	3	4
Johor Darul Ta'zim	1	2	3
Pahang	1	0	1
(Selangor) PKNS	0	0	0
Perak	0	2	2
Sabah (a)	1	1	2
Kelantan	2	0	2

Semi-finals
Terengganu	1	2	3
Johor Darul Ta'zim	0	2	2
Perak	5	2	7
Sabah	0	2	2

Final
Perak (p)	3(4)
Terengganu	3(1)

23 September 2018 Quarter-Final 1st leg	Pahang	1–1	Johor Darul Ta'zim	Kuantan, Pahang
21:00 UTC+8	Mohamadou Sumareh (yellow card) 76'; Austin Amutu (substituted off) 77'; Zuhair Aizat (substituted on) 77'; Azam Azih (substituted off) 81'; Wan Zaharulnizam Zakaria (substituted on) 81'; Safuwan Baharudin 90+2'		Gonzalo Cabrera 46'; Mohd Azrif Nasrulhaq (substituted off) 76'; S. Kunanlan (substituted on) 76'; Marcos Antonio (yellow card) 80'; Fernando Elizari (substituted off) 81'; Syamer Kutty Abba (substituted on) 81'; Safawi Rasid (substituted off) 88'; Syafiq Ahmad (substituted on) 88'	Stadium: Darul Makmur Stadium; Referee: Razlan Joffri Ali

30 September 2018 Quarter-Final 2nd leg	Johor Darul Ta'zim	2–0 (3–1 agg.)	Pahang	Johor Bahru, Johor
21:00 UTC+8	Safawi Rasid 1' (yellow card) 17' (goal) 73' (substituted off) 80'; Syafiq Ahmad (substituted on) 80'; Aidil Zafuan (substituted off) 83'; Kiko Insa (substituted on) 83'; Natxo Insa (substituted off) 89'; Mohd Afiq Fazail (substituted on) 89'		Safuwan Baharudin (yellow card) 16'; Matthew Davies (yellow card) 45+1'; Austin Amutu (substituted off) 46'; Zuhair Aizat (substituted on) 46'; Azam Azih (yellow card) 59' (substituted off) 87'; Afif Amiruddin (yellow card) 63'; Patrick Cruz (substituted off) 78'; Kogileswaran Raj (substituted on) 78'; Wan Zaharulnizam Zakaria (substituted on) 87'	Stadium: Tan Sri Dato' Haji Hassan Yunos Stadium; Attendance: 18,850; Referee: Mohd Zohri Tajuddin

6 October 2018 Semi-Final 1st leg	Terengganu	1–0	Johor Darul Ta'zim	Kuala Terengganu, Terengganu
21:00 UTC+8	Shahrul Aizad (substituted off) 46'; Faiz Nasir (substituted on) 46'; Ashari Samsudin (substituted off) 60'; Malik Ariff (substituted on) 60' (goal) 78' (yellow card) 90'		Ahmad Hazwan Bakri (substituted off) 77'; Syafiq Ahmad (substituted on) 77'; La'Vere Corbin-Ong (yellow card) 90+1'; Safawi Rasid (substituted off) 90+1'; Mohd Azrif Nasrulhaq (substituted on) 90+1'	Stadium: Sultan Ismail Nasiruddin Shah Stadium; Referee: Zulkarnain Zakaria

20 October 2018 Semi-Final 2nd leg	Johor Darul Ta'zim	2–2 (2–3 agg.)	Terengganu	Johor Bahru, Johor
21:00 UTC+8	Fernando Márquez (penalty scored) 41'; Gonzalo Cabrera 62'; Mohd Azrif Nasrulhaq (yellow card) 87'		Suffian Abdul Rahman (yellow card) 15'; Kipré Tchétché 69' 90+2'	Stadium: Tan Sri Dato Haji Hassan Yunos Stadium; Attendance: 21,150

=== AFC Champions League ===
Win Draw Loss

==== Qualifying play-off ====
23 January 2018 Preliminary round 2	Muangthong United (Thailand)	5–2	(Malaysia) Johor Darul Ta'zim	Bangkok, Thailand
19:00 UTC+7	Sarach Yooyen 7'; Tristan Do 21'; Heberty Fernandes 29' (pen.), 63'; Célio Ferreira (substituted off) 46'; Adisorn Promrak (substituted on) 46'; Theerathon Bunmathan 56'; Peerapat Notchaiya (substituted off) 66'; Charyl Chappuis (substituted on) 66'; Adisak Kraisorn (substituted off) 74'; Jajá Avelino (substituted on) 74'		Bruno Soares (yellow card) 24', (substituted off) 80'; Fazly Mazlan (substituted off) 44'; Mohd Azrif Nasrulhaq (substituted on) 44', (yellow card) 61'; Syafiq Ahmad (substituted off) 65'; Darren Lok (substituted on) 65', (yellow card) 81'; Gary Steven Robbat (substituted on) 80'; Jorge Pereyra Díaz (yellow card) 77', (goal) 90+2', 90+5'	Stadium: Supachalasai National Stadium; Attendance: 7,949; Referee: Aziz Asimov (Uzbekistan) UZB

=== AFC Cup ===
==== Group H ====
Pos	Team	Pld	W	D	L	GF	GA	GD	Pts	Qualification	PSJ	SLN	JDT	TAM
1	(Indonesia) Persija Jakarta	6	4	1	1	13	6	+7	13	Zonal semi-finals	—	1–0	4–0	4–1
2	(Vietnam) Sông Lam Nghệ An	6	3	1	2	8	5	+3	10 (Note: Head-to-head results: Sông Lam Nghệ An 2–0 Johor Darul Ta'zim, Johor Darul Ta'zim 3–2 Sông Lam Nghệ An.)		0–0	—	2–0	2–1
3	(Malaysia) Johor Darul Ta'zim	6	3	1	2	8	9	−1	10		3–0	3–2	—	2–1
4	(Singapore) Tampines Rovers	6	0	1	5	5	14	−9	1		2–4	0–2	0–0	—

Source: AFC
Notes:

14 February 2018 Matchday 1	Johor Darul Ta'zim (Malaysia)	3–0	(Indonesia) Persija Jakarta	Johor Bahru, Malaysia
21:00 UTC+8	Ahmad Hazwan Bakri 29' (substituted off) 73'; Jorge Pereyra Díaz 42'; La'Vere Corbin-Ong (yellow card) 64'; Azrif Nasrulhaq (substituted off) 67'; S. Kunanlan (substituted on) 67'; Safawi Rasid (substituted on) 73' (goal) 76'; Hariss Harun (yellow card) 79'; Mohd Afiq Fazail (substituted off) 87'; Amirul Hadi Zainal (substituted on) 87'		Marco Kabiay (yellow card) 11' (substituted off) 62'; Rudi Widodo (substituted off) 45'; Fitra Ridwan (substituted on) 45'; Asri Akbar (yellow card) 57'; Riko Simanjuntak (substituted on) 62'; Bambang Pamungkas (substituted off) 75'; Ahmad Syaifullah (substituted on) 75'; Valentino Telaubun (yellow card) 88'	Stadium: Tan Sri Dato Haji Hassan Yunos Stadium; Attendance: 18,600; Referee: Saoud Al-Abda (Qatar)

28 February 2018 Matchday 2	Sông Lam Nghệ An (Vietnam)	2–0	(Malaysia) Johor Darul Ta'zim	Nghệ An, Vietnam
21:00 UTC+7	Phan Văn Đức 22'; Hồ Sỹ Sâm (yellow card) 52' (substituted off) 90+4'; Ngô Xuân Toàn (substituted off) 63'; Lê Thế Cường (substituted on) 63'; Lê Văn Hùng (yellow card) 77'; Hồ Tuấn Tài (substituted off) 87'; Hồ Phúc Tịnh (substituted on) 87'; Phạm Xuân Mạnh 90+4'; Le Manh Dung (substituted on) 90+4'		Mohd Afiq Fazail (substituted off) 40'; Aidil Zafuan (substituted on) 40'; Ahmad Hazwan Bakri (substituted off) 58'; Syafiq Ahmad (substituted on) 58'; S. Kunanlan (yellow card) 85'; Luciano Figueroa (yellow card) 90+1'	Stadium: Vinh Stadium; Attendance: 6,000; Referee: Mahmood Al-Majarafi (Oman)

6 March 2018 Matchday 3	Tampines Rovers (Singapore)	0–0	(Malaysia) Johor Darul Ta'zim	Tampines, Singapore
21:00 UTC+7	Fahrudin Mustafic (substituted off) 19'; Afiq Yunos (substituted on) 19'; Safirul Sulaiman (yellow card) 25'; Khairul Amri (yellow card) 54' (substituted off) 65'; Fazrul Nawaz (substituted on) 65'; Yasir Hanapi (yellow card) 69'; Zulfadhmi Suzliman (substituted off) 71'; Jordan Webb (substituted on) 71'		Nazmi Faiz (yellow card) 14' (substituted off) 46'; Safiq Rahim (substituted on) 46'; Amirul Hadi Zainal (substituted off) 65'; Hariss Harun (substituted on) 65'; Mohd Afiq Fazail (yellow card) 67'; Aidil Zafuan (substituted off) 76'; Safawi Rasid (substituted on) 76'; Mohd Azrif Nasrulhaq (yellow card) 90'	Stadium: Our Tampines Hub Stadium; Attendance: 2,250; Referee: Hussein Abo Yehia (Lebanon)

14 March 2018 Matchday 4	Johor Darul Ta'zim (Malaysia)	2–1	(Singapore) Tampines Rovers	Johor Bahru, Malaysia
21:00 UTC+8	Safawi Rasid 13'; La'Vere Corbin-Ong (yellow card) 44'; Mohd Azrif Nasrulhaq (substituted on) 61'; Safiq Rahim (substituted off) 65'; Hariss Harun (substituted on) 65'; Ahmad Hazwan Bakri (yellow card) 66' (goal) 79' (substituted off) 82'; Darren Lok (substituted on) 82'		Khairul Amri 45' (pen.); Jordan Webb (substituted off) 71'; Zulfadhmi Suzliman (substituted on) 71'; Fahrudin Mustafic (substituted off) 75'; Afiq Yunos (substituted on) 75'; Fazrul Nawaz (yellow card) 78' (substituted off) 87'; Shah Shahiran (substituted on) 87'	Stadium: Tan Sri Dato Haji Hassan Yunos Stadium; Attendance: 8,750; Referee: Payam Heidari (Iran)

10 April 2018 Matchday 5	Persija Jakarta (Indonesia)	4–0	(Malaysia) Johor Darul Ta'zim	Jakarta, Indonesia
21:00 UTC+7	Marko Šimić 8' 12' 19' 87' (pen.); Novri Setiawan (substituted off) 75'; Addison Alves (substituted on) 75'; Ramdani Lestaluhu (substituted off) 82'; Yan Pieter Nasadit (substituted on) 82'; Sandi Sute (substituted off) 88'; Septinus Alua (substituted on) 88'		Nazmi Faiz (yellow card) 15'; Adam Nor Azlin (yellow card) 17' (red card) 78'; Mohd Amirul Hadi Zainal (substituted off) 45'; Mohd Azrif Nasrulhaq (substituted on) 45' (yellow card) 90+3'; Muhammad Fazly Mazlan (substituted off) 45'; Safiq Rahim (substituted on) 45'; Syafiq Ahmad (yellow card) 64' (substituted off) 66'; Ahmad Hazwan Bakri (substituted on) 66'	Stadium: Gelora Bung Karno Stadium; Attendance: 60,157; Referee: Sivakorn Pu-udom (Thailand)

24 April 2018 Matchday 6	Johor Darul Ta'zim (Malaysia)	3–2	(Vietnam) Sông Lam Nghệ An	Johor Bahru, Malaysia
21:00 UTC+8	Safawi Rasid 36'; Syafiq Ahmad 39' (yellow card) 42' (substituted off) 72'; Mohd Afiq Fazail (yellow card) 57' (substituted off) 74'; Safiq Rahim 67' pen Darren Lok (substituted on) 72'; Gary Steven Robbat (substituted on) 74'; Fadhli Shas (substituted off) 77'; Marcos Antonio (substituted on) 77'		Nguyễn Viết Nguyên 41'; Hồ Tuấn Tài 45+1' (substituted off) 85'; Nguyễn Sỹ Nam (yellow card) 65'; Cao Xuân Thắng (substituted off) 73'; Phan Văn Đức (substituted on) 73'; Hồ Sỹ Sâm (substituted off) 78'; Hồ Khắc Ngọc (substituted on) 78'; Trần Văn Tiến (yellow card) 83'; Nguyễn Phú Nguyên (substituted on) 85'	Stadium: Tan Sri Dato Haji Hassan Yunos Stadium; Attendance: 5,170; Referee: Kim Hee-Gon (South Korea)

== Club statistics ==
=== Appearances ===
Correct as of match played on 06 October 2018

No.	Pos.	Name	League	FA Cup	Malaysia Cup	Asia^{1}	Total
1	GK	(Malaysia) Farizal Marlias	18	3	9	3	33
3	DF	(Malaysia) Adam Nor Azlin	2+3	0	0	3	5+3
4	MF	(Malaysia) Afiq Fazail	6+3	0	1+1	6	13+4
5	FW	(Argentina) Fernando Elizari	8	0	7	0	15
5	MF	(Malaysia) Amirul Hadi Zainal	1	0+2	0	2+1	3+3
6	DF	(Brazil) Marcos António	20	4	7	1+1	32+1
7	DF	(Malaysia) Aidil Zafuan	9+2	0	6	3+1	18+3
8	MF	(Malaysia) Safiq Rahim	7+6	3+1	0+1	5+2	15+10
9	FW	(Malaysia) Hazwan Bakri	9+9	4	7+2	6+1	26+12
10	MF	(France) Harry Novillo	3	0	0	0	3
11	FW	(Argentina) Gonzalo Cabrera	20+1	4	9	0	33+1
12	DF	(Malaysia) S. Kunanlan	13+4	0+2	4+3	4+1	21+10
13	MF	(Malaysia) Gary Steven Robbat	2+4	0	2	0+2	4+6
14	MF	(Singapore) Amirul Adli	20+1	4	6	4+2	33+3
15	DF	(Malaysia) Fazly Mazlan	0	0	0	3	3
16	DF	(Malaysia) Syamer Kutty Abba	4	0	0+3	0	4+3
17	FW	(Malaysia) (Australia) Jordan Ollerenshaw	0+2	0+2	0+2	2+3	2+9
18	FW	(Argentina) Fernando Márquez	10	0	6	0	16
20	DF	(Malaysia) Azrif Nasrulhaq	10+3	4	4	3+3	21+6
21	MF	(Malaysia) Nazmi Faiz	6+7	1	2+2	2	10+9
22	DF	(Malaysia) (Canada) Corbin-Ong	21	4	9	4	38
23	DF	(Malaysia) (Spain) Kiko Insa	1+1	0	0+2	0	1+3
24	GK	(Malaysia) Izham Tarmizi	2	1	0	4	7
25	MF	(Malaysia) (Sweden) Junior Eldstål	0	0	0	1	1
26	GK	(Malaysia) Haziq Nadzli	2	0	0	0	2
27	DF	(Malaysia) Fadhli Shas	13+2	4	4	4	25+2
28	FW	(Malaysia) Syafiq Ahmad	0+4	0+1	0+2	5+1	5+8
29	FW	(Malaysia) Safawi Rasid	13+8	3+1	5	3+2	24+11
30	MF	(Malaysia) (Spain) Natxo Insa	11+3	4	9	5	29+3
30	MF	(Malaysia) Rozaimi Abdul Rahman	0	0	0+1	0	0+1
Left club during season
2	DF	(Brazil) Bruno Soares	0	0	0	1	1
11	FW	(Argentina) Jorge Pereyra Díaz	4	0	0	2	6
19	FW	(Argentina) Luciano Figueroa	4	1	0	2	7
19	FW	(Brazil) Jorge Santos Silva	3+1	0	0	0	3+1
18	MF	(Argentina) Nicolás Fernández	1+1	0+2	0	0	1+3

^{1} Includes AFC Champions League qualifying play-offs and AFC Cup matches.

=== Top scorers ===
Rnk	No.	Pos.	Name	League	FA Cup	Malaysia Cup	Asia	Total
1	29	FW	(Malaysia) Safawi Rasid	6	3	4	3	16
2	23	FW	(Argentina) Gonzalo Cabrera	9	1	2	0	12
3	18	FW	(Argentina) Fernando Márquez	7	0	4	0	11
3	11	FW	(Argentina) Jorge Pereyra Díaz	2	0	0	3	5
4	30	MF	(Malaysia) Natxo Insa	3	0	1	0	4
4	9	FW	(Malaysia) Hazwan Bakri	1	0	1	2	4
5	6	DF	(Brazil) Marcos Antonio	3	0	0	0	3
5	19	FW	(Argentina) Luciano Figueroa	2	1	0	0	3
5	8	MF	(Malaysia) Safiq Rahim	2	0	0	1	3
6	21	MF	(Malaysia) Nazmi Faiz	2	0	0	0	2
6	5	MF	(Argentina) Fernando Elizari	2	0	0	0	2
6	28	MF	(Malaysia) Syafiq Ahmad	1	0	0	1	2
7	27	DF	(Malaysia) Fadhli Shas	1	0	0	0	1
7	22	MF	(Malaysia) La'Vere Corbin-Ong	1	0	0	0	1
7	10	MF	(France) Harry Novillo	1	0	0	0	1
7	19	FW	(Brazil) Jorge Santos Silva	1	0	0	0	1
7	14	MF	(Singapore) Amirul Adli	1	0	0	0	1
7	4	MF	(Malaysia) Mohd Afiq Fazail	1	0	0	0	1
7	12	MF	(Malaysia) S. Kunanlan	0	0	1	0	1
Own goals				1	0	0	0	1
Total				47	5	14	10	76

=== Hat-tricks ===
Player	Competition	Against	Result	Date
(Malaysia) Safawi Rasid	FA Cup	UiTM	3–2	17 Mar 2017

=== Top assists ===
Rnk	No.	Pos.	Name	League	FA Cup	Malaysia Cup	Asia	Total
1	23	FW	(Malaysia) (United States) Wan Kuzri Wan Kamal	7	1	0	0	8
2	20	DF	(Malaysia) Azrif Nasrulhaq	2	1	0	2	5
3	8	MF	(Malaysia) Safiq Rahim	3	1	0	0	4
3	29	FW	(Malaysia) Safawi Rasid	3	0	1	0	4
3	5	MF	(Argentina) Fernando Elizari	3	0	1	0	4
3	9	FW	(Malaysia) Hazwan Bakri	2	1	1	0	4
3	22	DF	(Malaysia) Corbin-Ong	2	0	1	1	4
3	30	MF	(Malaysia) Natxo Insa	2	0	0	2	4
4	18	FW	(Argentina) Fernando Márquez	2	0	1	0	3
4	12	MF	(Malaysia) S. Kunanlan	2	0	0	1	3
5	21	FW	(Malaysia) Nazmi Faiz	2	0	0	0	2
6	18	MF	(Argentina) Nicolás Fernández	1	0	0	0	1
6	19	FW	(Argentina) Luciano Figueroa	1	0	0	0	1
6	16	FW	(Malaysia) Syamer Kutty Abba	1	0	0	0	1
6	14	MF	(Malaysia) Hariss Harun	0	0	1	0	1
6	4	MF	(Malaysia) Afiq Fazail	0	0	0	1	1
6	11	FW	(Argentina) Jorge Pereyra Díaz	0	0	0	1	1
Total				32	4	6	8	51

=== Clean sheets ===
Rnk	No.	Name	League	FA Cup	Malaysia Cup	Asia	Total
1	1	(Malaysia) Farizal Marlias	13	1	3	2	19
2	26	(Malaysia) Haziq Nadzli	1	0	0	0	1

=== Discipline ===
Rnk	No.	Player	Total			League			FA Cup			Malaysia Cup			Asia		
Rnk	No.	Player	Yellow card	(yellow card) (red card)	Red card	Yellow card	(yellow card) (red card)	Red card	Yellow card	(yellow card) (red card)	Red card	Yellow card	(yellow card) (red card)	Red card	Yellow card	(yellow card) (red card)	Red card
1	20	(Malaysia) Azrif Nasrulhaq	6	0	0	2	0	0	1	0	0	0	0	0	3	0	0
1	22	(Malaysia) Corbin-Ong	5	1	0	2	1	0	1	0	0	0	0	0	2	0	0
2	14	(Singapore) Amirul Adli	5	0	0	3	0	0	1	0	0	0	0	0	1	0	0
3	10	(Malaysia) Natxo Insa	4	0	0	3	0	0	0	0	0	1	0	0	0	0	0
3	9	(Malaysia) Ahmad Hazwan Bakri	4	0	0	2	0	0	0	0	0	1	0	0	1	0	0
3	4	(Malaysia) Mohd Afiq Fazail	4	0	0	2	0	0	0	0	0	0	0	0	2	0	0
4	29	(Malaysia) Safawi Rasid	3	0	0	3	0	0	0	0	0	0	0	0	0	0	0
4	6	(Brazil) Marcos Antonio	3	0	0	1	0	0	1	0	0	1	0	0	0	0	0
4	28	(Malaysia) Syafiq Ahmad	3	0	0	1	0	0	0	0	0	0	0	0	2	0	0
5	8	(Malaysia) Safiq Rahim	2	0	0	2	0	0	0	0	0	0	0	0	0	0	0
5	27	(Malaysia) Fadhli Shas	2	0	0	2	0	0	0	0	0	0	0	0	0	0	0
5	16	(Malaysia) Syamer Kutty Abba	2	0	0	2	0	0	0	0	0	0	0	0	0	0	0
5	11	(Malaysia) (United States) Wan Kuzri Wan Kamal	2	0	0	1	0	0	0	0	0	1	0	0	0	0	0
5	18	(Argentina) Fernando Márquez	2	0	0	1	0	0	0	0	0	1	0	0	0	0	0
5	12	(Malaysia) S. Kunanlan	2	0	0	1	0	0	0	0	0	0	0	0	1	0	0
5	19	(Argentina) Luciano Figueroa	2	0	0	0	0	0	1	0	0	0	0	0	1	0	0
5	21	(Malaysia) Nazmi Faiz	2	0	0	0	0	0	0	0	0	0	0	0	2	0	0
6	3	(Malaysia) Adam Nor Azlin	1	1	0	0	0	0	0	0	0	0	0	0	1	1	0
7	7	(Malaysia) Aidil Zafuan	0	0	1	0	0	1	0	0	0	0	0	0	0	0	0
8	13	(Malaysia) Gary Steven Robbat	1	0	0	1	0	0	0	0	0	0	0	0	0	0	0
8	5	(Argentina) Fernando Elizari	1	0	0	1	0	0	0	0	0	0	0	0	0	0	0
8	1	(Malaysia) Mohd Farizal Marlias	1	0	0	1	0	0	0	0	0	0	0	0	0	0	0
8	2	(Brazil) Bruno Soares	1	0	0	0	0	0	0	0	0	0	0	0	1	0	0
8	11	(Argentina) Jorge Pereyra Díaz	1	0	0	0	0	0	0	0	0	0	0	0	1	0	0
8	17	(Malaysia) Jordan Ollerenshaw	1	0	0	0	0	0	0	0	0	0	0	0	1	0	0
Totals			60	2	1	31	1	1	5	0	0	5	0	0	19	1	0

== Transfers and contracts ==
=== In ===
No.	Pos.	Name	Age	Moving from	Type	Transfer Date	Transfer fee
3	DF	(Malaysia) Adam Nor Azlin	30	(Malaysia) Selangor	Transfer	17 November 2017	Undisclosed
–	MF	(Malaysia) Syamer Kutty Abba	29	(Malaysia) Penang	Transfer	17 November 2017	Undisclosed
19	FW	(Argentina) Luciano Figueroa	45	Free agent	Transfer	20 November 2017	Undisclosed
11	FW	(Argentina) Jorge Pereyra Díaz	36	(Mexico) Club León	Loan Return	20 November 2017	NA
22	DF	(Malaysia) (Canada) La'Vere Corbin-Ong	35	(Netherlands) Go Ahead Eagles	Transfer	24 November 2017	Undisclosed
14	MF	(Singapore) Amirul Adli	30	(Malaysia) Johor Darul Ta'zim II	Loan Return	30 November 2017	NA
28	FW	(Malaysia) Syafiq Ahmad	31	(Malaysia) Kedah	Transfer	19 December 2017	Undisclosed
2	DF	(Brazil) Bruno Soares	38	(Israel) Hapoel Tel Aviv	Transfer	24 December 2017	Undisclosed
11	MF	(Malaysia) (United States) Wan Kuzri Wan Kamal	24	(Malaysia) Johor Darul Ta'zim II	Transfer	2 February 2018	Undisclosed
10	MF	(France) Harry Novillo	34	(United Arab Emirates) Baniyas Club	Transfer	3 May 2018	Free transfer
23	DF	(Malaysia) (Spain) Kiko Insa	38	(Thailand) Bangkok Glass	Transfer	3 May 2018	Free transfer
19	FW	(Brazil) Jorge Santos Silva	39	(Saudi Arabia) Al-Batin	Transfer	4 May 2018	Free transfer
18	FW	(Argentina) Fernando Márquez	38	(Argentina) Club Atlético Belgrano	Transfer	1 June 2018	Undisclosed
5	MF	(Argentina) Fernando Elizari	35	(Chile) O'Higgins	Transfer	3 June 2018	Undisclosed

=== Out ===
No.	Pos.	Name	Age	Moving to	Type
2	FW	(Malaysia) Azamuddin Akil	41	(Malaysia) Selangor	Released
23	MF	(Malaysia) S. Chanturu	30	(Malaysia) Melaka United	Free transfer
17	FW	(Malaysia) R. Gopinathan	36	(Malaysia) Melaka United	Free transfer
10	FW	(Argentina) Gabriel Guerra	33	(Argentina) Boca Juniors	Released
22	FW	(Lebanon) Mohammed Ghaddar	42	(Malaysia) Kelantan	Released
16	MF	(Malaysia) (United States) Wan Kuzain	28	(Malaysia) Johor Darul Ta'zim II	Loan
3	DF	(Malaysia) Hasbullah Abu Bakar	32	(Malaysia) Johor Darul Ta'zim II	Loan
26	DF	(Malaysia) Dominic Tan	29	(Portugal) Vilaverdense	Loan
–	MF	(Malaysia) Syamer Kutty Abba	29	(Portugal) Vilaverdense	Loan
18	DF	(Malaysia) Mahali Jasuli	37	(Malaysia) PKNS	Loan
11	FW	(Argentina) Jorge Pereyra Díaz	36	(Argentina) Club Atlético Lanús	Released
19	FW	(Argentina) Luciano Figueroa	45	-	Retired
10	FW	(France) Harry Novillo	34	(Malaysia) Johor Darul Ta'zim II	Transfer
19	FW	(Brazil) Jorge Santos Silva	39	(United Arab Emirates) Al-Fujairah	Transfer

=== Contract Extension ===
No.	Pos.	Name	Contract Till	No of years
16	DF	(Malaysia) Syamer Kutty Abba	2022	4 Years
26	GK	(Malaysia) Haziq Nadzli	2022	4 Years
28	FW	(Malaysia) Safawi Rasid	2022	4 Years
24	GK	(Malaysia) Izham Tarmizi	2021	3 Years
15	DF	(Malaysia) Fazly Mazlan	2021	3 Years
20	DF	(Malaysia) Azrif Nasrulhaq	2021	3 Years
27	DF	(Malaysia) Fadhli Shas	2021	3 Years
4	MF	(Malaysia) Afiq Fazail	2020	2 Years
9	FW	(Malaysia) Hazwan Bakri	2020	2 Years
14	MF	(Malaysia) Gary Steven Robbat	2020	2 Years
7	DF	(Malaysia) Aidil Zafuan	2019	1 Years
12	DF	(Malaysia) S. Kunanlan	2019	1 Years
14	MF	(Singapore) Hariss Harun	2021	3 Years

== Home attendance ==
All matches will be played at Larkin Stadium.

Date	Attendance	Opposition	Score	Competition	Ref
3 February 2018	23,030	Kedah	2–1	Malaysia Super League Match Day 1 Charity Shield	
6 February 2018	14,160	PNKP	3–0	Malaysia Super League Match Day 2	
14 February 2018	18,600	Persija Jakarta	3–0	AFC Cup Group H Match Day 1	
24 February 2018	17,926	Melaka United	3–0	Malaysia Super League Match Day 4	
14 March 2018	8,750	Tampines Rovers	2–1	AFC Cup Group H Match Day 4	
14 April 2018	8,310	PKNS	3–0	Malaysia Super League Match Day 6	
20 April 2018	17,320	Pahang	0–3	Malaysia FA Cup Q-Final 2nd Leg	
24 April 2018	5,170	Sông Lam Nghệ An	3–2	AFC Cup Group H Match Day 6	
1 May 2018	10,220	Selangor	2–0	Malaysia Super League Match Day 8	
23 May 2018^{R}	6,670	Negeri Sembilan	2–0	Malaysia Super League Match Day 11	
2 June 2018^{R}	9,710	Perak	2–0	Malaysia Super League Match Day 13	
8 June 2018^{R}	11,612	Pahang	1–0	Malaysia Super League Match Day 14	
20 June 2018		Terengganu		Malaysia Super League Match Day 16	
17 July 2018		Kelantan		Malaysia Super League Match Day 20	
28 July 2018		Kuala Lumpur		Malaysia Super League Match Day 22	

R denotes Match(s) to be played during the Month of Ramadhan

=== Attendance (Each Competitions) ===
Competition(s)	Match(s)	Total Attendance	Average Attendance per Match
Malaysian Super League	8	94,968	11,871
Malaysia FA Cup	1	17,320	17,320
Malaysia Cup	–	–	–
AFC Cup	3	27,350	10,840
Total & Average Attendance (Overall)	12	139,638	11,637

== See also ==
- 2017 Johor Darul Ta'zim F.C. season
