= 2018 Kelantan FA season =

Kelantan
2018 season
- President: Bibi Ramjani Ilias Khan
- Manager: Wan Rakemi Wan Zahari
- Head Coach: Yusri Che Lah
- Stadium: Sultan Muhammad IV Stadium
- Super League: 11th (relegated)
- FA Cup: Third round
- Malaysia Cup: Quarter-finals
- Top goalscorer: League: Shafiq Shaharudin (6); All: Shafiq Shaharudin (7)
Home colours	Away colours	Third colours

The 2018 season is Kelantan's 10th season in the Malaysia Super League (Malay: Liga Super Malaysia) since being promoted and 23rd successive season in the top flight of Malaysian football league system.

== Sponsors ==
Title Sponsor

- BMW

Shirt Sponsor

- Lotto

Co-Sponsors

- aL-ikhsaN
- Al-Quds Umrah & Tours
- Konsortium e-Mutiara
- ROHM Semiconductor
- Yakult

Partners

- MESRA Medicare
- Excel Printing & Copy Centre
- Pakaq Gomo Gym
- Exa Supply

== Club officials ==
=== Coaching staff ===
Position	Staff
Team manager	(Malaysia) Wan Rakemi Wan Zahari
Assistant team manager	(Malaysia) Mustaman Che Yusof
Head coach	(Malaysia) Yusri Che Lah (caretaker)
Assistant head coach	(Malaysia) Kamaruddin Muhammad
Assistant coach	(Malaysia) Shaiful Hazmi Salleh
Goalkeeper coach	(Malaysia) Azam Othman
Fitness coach	(Malaysia) Shaiful Hazmi Salleh
Team doctor	(Malaysia) Dr. Zairuddin Abdullah Zawawi
Physiotherapist	(Malaysia) Zamri Pauzi
Masseur	(Malaysia) Fikri Zulkifli
Kit man	(Malaysia) Harun Ismail
Assistant kit man	(Malaysia) Suhaimi Harun
Under-21 head coach	(Malaysia) Zahasmi Ismail
Under-19 head coach	(Malaysia) Sideek Shamsuddin
Media officer	(Malaysia) Normeezan Muhd Nordin

=== Other information ===
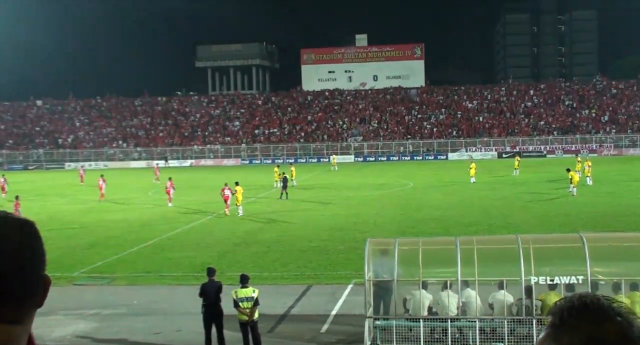
Sultan Muhammad IV Stadium

President	(Malaysia) Bibi Ramjani Ilias Khan
Deputy President	(Malaysia) Afandi Hamzah
Vice Presidents	(Malaysia) Mohd Aizuddin Mohd Ghazali (until July) (Malaysia) Nik Pakheruddin Nik Abd Kadir (Malaysia) Nik Izani Nik Ibrahim (until July)
Secretary General	(Malaysia) Husin Deraman (until August) (Malaysia) Farah Anida Mansor
Treasurer	(Malaysia) Ahmad Razali Azmi (until June)
Technical Director	(Germany) Jorg Peter Stinebrunner
Ground (capacity and dimensions)	Sultan Muhammad IV Stadium (30,000 / 119x100 metres)
Training Ground	MARDI Field, Pasir Puteh

== Squad information ==
=== First team squad ===
As of 5 May 2018.

No.	Name	Nat	Position(s)	Since	Date of birth (Age)	Signed from
Goalkeepers
1	Shahrizan Ismail (captain)	(Malaysia)	GK	2008	3 November 1980 (age 46)	(Malaysia) Terengganu
22	Faridzuean Kamaruddin	(Malaysia)	GK	2018	30 March 1995 (age 31)	(Malaysia) Melaka United
35	Fikri Che Soh ^{U21}	(Malaysia)	GK	2018	1 February 1998 (age 28)	Youth system
Defenders
4	Cássio	(Brazil)	CB	2018	21 November 1989 (age 36)	(Indonesia) Semen Padang
6	Farisham Ismail (vice-captain)	(Malaysia)	RB / LB / CB	2008	5 January 1985 (age 41)	(Malaysia) TM
12	Haziq Puad	(Malaysia)	CB	2018	26 May 1993 (age 33)	(Malaysia) Kuantan
13	Azwan Aripin	(Malaysia)	CB	2016	21 April 1996 (age 30)	Youth system
15	Khairul Asyraf	(Malaysia)	RB / RWB	2018	31 December 1994 (age 31)	(Malaysia) PKNP
28	Faizol Nazlin	(Malaysia)	CB / DM	2014	27 October 1992 (age 34)	Youth system
36	Syaiful Alias ^{U21}	(Malaysia)	CB	2018	4 February 1999 (age 27)	Youth system
40	Shahrul Nizam ^{U21}	(Malaysia)	CB	2018	25 May 1998 (age 28)	Youth system
41	Nik Umar ^{U21}	(Malaysia)	LB / LWB	2018	15 June 2001 (age 25)	Youth system
Midfielders
17	Bakhtiyar Duyshobekov	(Kyrgyzstan)	DM	2018	3 June 1995 (age 31)	(Kyrgyzstan) Dordoi Bishkek
18	Amir Zikri	(Malaysia)	LM	2016	17 March 1994 (age 32)	Youth system
20	Haikal Nazri	(Malaysia)	LM	2018	16 February 1993 (age 33)	(Malaysia) Felcra
26	Fadhilah Pauzi	(Malaysia)	DM	2016	23 April 1996 (age 30)	Youth system
33	Nik Akif Syahiran ^{U21}	(Malaysia)	RW / AM	2018	11 May 1999 (age 27)	Youth system
34	Danial Haqim ^{U21}	(Malaysia)	CM	2018	29 August 1998 (age 28)	Youth system
37	Danial Ashraf ^{U21}	(Malaysia)	AM	2016	8 January 1997 (age 29)	Youth system
Forwards
7	Fakhrul Zaman	(Malaysia)	CF / RW	2016	13 April 1994 (age 32)	Youth system
8	Shafiq Shaharudin	(Malaysia)	CF / LW	2018	26 March 1994 (age 32)	(Malaysia) Johor Darul Ta'zim II
9	Cristiano Santos	(Brazil)	CF	2018	17 March 1988 (age 38)	(Morocco) Hassania Agadir
27	Khairul Rizam	(Malaysia)	CF	2018	15 November 1992 (age 33)	(Malaysia) T-Team
32	Nik Azli ^{U21}	(Malaysia)	CF / RW	2018	26 January 1997 (age 29)	Youth system
38	Imran Samso ^{U21}	(Malaysia)	CF / AM	2018	19 May 1998 (age 28)	Youth system
39	Afiq Saluddin ^{U21}	(Malaysia)	CF	2018	21 June 1998 (age 28)	Youth system
43	Ivaan Hakimi ^{U21}	(Malaysia)	CF	2018	1999	Youth system

- U21 = Under-21 player

== New contracts ==
No.	Pos	Player	Contract length	Contract end	Date	Source
23	DM	(Malaysia) S. Veenod	2 years	2019	22 November 2017	
10	LW	(South Korea) Do Dong-hyun	2 years	2019	23 November 2017	
4	CB	(Brazil) Cássio	2 years	2019	3 December 2017	
8	CF	(Malaysia) Shafiq Shaharudin	2 years	2019	5 December 2017	
12	CM	(Malaysia) Sukri Hamid	2 years	2019	6 December 2017	
20	LM	(Malaysia) Haikal Nazri	2 years	2019	6 December 2017	
3	LB	(Malaysia) Tengku Qayyum	1 year	2018	6 December 2017	
15	RB	(Malaysia) Khairul Asyraf	2 years	2019	13 December 2017	
27	CF	(Malaysia) Khairul Rizam	2 years	2019	13 December 2017	
18	LW	(Malaysia) Amir Zikri	2 years	2019	13 December 2017	
24	CB	(Malaysia) Amirizdwan Taj	1 year	2018	20 December 2017	
9	CF	(Brazil) Bruno Lopes	1 year	2018	29 December 2017	
17	CF	(Indonesia) Ferdinand Sinaga	1 year	2018	4 January 2018	
29	CF	(Malaysia) Zul Fahmi Awang	2 years	2019	6 January 2018	
22	CF	(Lebanon) Mohammed Ghaddar	1 years	2018	12 February 2018	

== Transfers ==
=== In ===
==== First window ====
No.	Pos	Player	Transferred From	Date	Fee	Source
33	AM	(Malaysia) Nik Akif Syahiran	Youth system	11 November 2017	Promoted	
23	DM	(Malaysia) S. Veenod	(Malaysia) Selangor	22 November 2017	Free transfer	
10	LW	(South Korea) Do Dong-hyun	(Malaysia) UiTM	23 November 2017	Free transfer	
5	RB	(Malaysia) Nik Shahrul Azim	(Malaysia) Negeri Sembilan	30 November 2017	Loan return	
–	CB	(Malaysia) Nasharizam Rashid	(Malaysia) Perlis	30 November 2017	Loan return	
–	RM	(Malaysia) Syafiq Rahman	(Malaysia) Perlis	30 November 2017	Loan return	
–	CM	(Malaysia) Shahrul Hakim	(Malaysia) MIFA	30 November 2017	Loan return	
7	CF	(Malaysia) Fakhrul Zaman	(Malaysia) MIFA	30 November 2017	Loan return	
4	CB	(Brazil) Cássio	(Indonesia) Semen Padang	3 December 2017	Free transfer	
8	CF	(Malaysia) Shafiq Shaharudin	(Malaysia) Johor Darul Ta'zim II	5 December 2017	Free transfer	
12	CM	(Malaysia) Sukri Hamid	(Malaysia) PKNP	6 December 2017	Free transfer	
3	LB	(Malaysia) Tengku Qayyum	(Malaysia) Sime Darby	6 December 2017	Free transfer	
20	LM	(Malaysia) Haikal Nazri	(Malaysia) Felcra	6 December 2017	Free transfer	
15	RB	(Malaysia) Khairul Asyraf	(Malaysia) PKNP	13 December 2017	Free transfer	
27	CF	(Malaysia) Khairul Rizam	(Malaysia) T-Team youth	13 December 2017	Free transfer	
18	LW	(Malaysia) Amir Zikri	(Malaysia) Perlis	13 December 2017	Loan return	
24	CB	(Malaysia) Amirizdwan Taj	(Malaysia) PKNS	20 December 2017	Free transfer	
9	CF	(Brazil) Bruno Lopes	(Indonesia) Persija Jakarta	29 December 2017	Free transfer	
17	CF	(Indonesia) Ferdinand Sinaga	(Indonesia) PSM Makassar	4 January 2018	Free transfer	
29	CF	(Malaysia) Zul Fahmi Awang	(Malaysia) Sime Darby	6 January 2018	Free transfer	
22	CF	(Lebanon) Mohammed Ghaddar	(Malaysia) Johor Darul Ta'zim	12 February 2018	Free transfer	

==== Second window ====
No.	Pos	Player	Transferred From	Date	Fee	Source
3	CB	(Tunisia) Alaeddine Bouslimi	(Tunisia) Hammam-Lif	18 May 2018	Free transfer	
12	CB	(Malaysia) Haziq Puad	(Malaysia) Kuantan	22 May 2018	Free transfer	
22	GK	(Malaysia) Faridzuean Kamaruddin	(Malaysia) Melaka United	22 May 2018	Free transfer	
17	DM	(Kyrgyzstan) Bakhtiyar Duyshobekov	(Kyrgyzstan) Dordoi Bishkek	1 June 2018	Free transfer	
11	CF	(Namibia) Lazarus Kaimbi	(Thailand) Suphanburi	5 June 2018	Free transfer	
9	CF	(Brazil) Cristiano Santos	(Morocco) Hassania Agadir	17 June 2018	Free transfer	

=== Out ===
==== First window ====
No.	Pos	Player	Transferred To	Date	Fee	Source
33	GK	(Malaysia) Syihan Hazmi	(Malaysia) Negeri Sembilan	11 November 2017	Free transfer	
3	CB	(Malaysia) S. Subramaniam	(Malaysia) MIFA	11 November 2017	Free transfer	
13	LB	(Malaysia) Aziz Ismail	Unattached	11 November 2017	Released	
18	AM	(Malaysia) Khairul Izuan	(Malaysia) Negeri Sembilan	11 November 2017	Free transfer	
14	RW	(Malaysia) S. Thinagaran	Unattached	11 November 2017	Released	
12	CB	(The Gambia) Mamadou Danso	Unattached	11 November 2017	Released	
29	CF	(Brazil) Alessandro Celin	Unattached	11 November 2017	Released	
7	LB	(Malaysia) Qayyum Marjoni	(Malaysia) PKNS	13 November 2017	Free transfer	
23	RW	(Malaysia) Indra Putra Mahayuddin	(Malaysia) Kuala Lumpur	4 December 2017	Free transfer	
8	CM	(Malaysia) Shahrul Hakim	(Malaysia) D'AR Wanderers	24 December 2017	Free transfer	
11	CB	(Malaysia) Hasmizan Kamarodin	(Malaysia) Terengganu City	25 December 2017	Free transfer	
2	CB	(Malaysia) Norhafiz Zamani	(Malaysia) Penang	27 December 2017	Free transfer	
15	RB	(Malaysia) Daudsu Jamaluddin	(Malaysia) Kuantan	1 January 2018	Free transfer	
24	LB	(Malaysia) Zairul Fitree	(Malaysia) Kuantan	1 January 2018	Free transfer	
9	CF	(Lebanon) Abou Bakr Al-Mel	(Lebanon) AC Tripoli	1 January 2018	Undisclosed	
12	CM	(Malaysia) Sukri Hamid	Unattached	14 March 2018	Released	
–	LW	(Malaysia) Hattaphon Bun An	Unattached	14 March 2018	Released	
17	CF	(Indonesia) Ferdinand Sinaga	(Indonesia) PSM Makassar	19 March 2018	Free transfer	
–	RM	(Malaysia) Syafiq Rahman	Unattached	19 March 2018	Released	
–	CB	(Malaysia) Nasharizam Rashid	Unattached	25 March 2018	Released	
3	LB	(Malaysia) Tengku Qayyum	Unattached	27 March 2018	Released	

=== Loan out ===
==== First window ====
No.	Pos	Player	Loaned To	Start	End	Source
—	CB	(Malaysia) Nasharizam Rashid	(Malaysia) D'AR Wanderers	1 January 2018	30 November 2018	
—	CF	(France) L'Imam Seydi	(Malaysia) MIFA	1 January 2018	30 November 2018	
29	CF	(Malaysia) Zul Fahmi Awang	(Malaysia) D'AR Wanderers	10 February 2018	30 November 2018	
11	AM	(Malaysia) Nor Farhan Muhammad	(Malaysia) D'AR Wanderers	1 April 2018	30 November 2018	

=== Out ===
==== Second window ====
No.	Pos	Player	Transferred To	Date	Fee	Source
9	CF	(Brazil) Bruno Lopes	(Japan) Montedio Yamagata	4 April 2018	Free transfer	
23	DM	(Malaysia) S. Veenod	(Malaysia) Melaka United	4 April 2018	Free transfer	
19	GK	(Malaysia) Khairul Fahmi Che Mat	(Malaysia) Melaka United	7 May 2018	Free transfer	
5	RB	(Malaysia) Nik Shahrul Azim	(Malaysia) PKNS	19 May 2018	Free transfer	
22	CF	(Lebanon) Mohammed Ghaddar	Unattached	21 May 2018	Released	
30	GK	(Malaysia) Ramadhan Hamid	(Malaysia) Kedah	21 May 2018	Free transfer	
3	CB	(Tunisia) Alaeddine Bouslimi	(Tunisia) AS Gabès	1 June 2018	Free transfer	
10	LW	(South Korea) Do Dong-hyun	(Malaysia) Terengganu	4 June 2018	Free transfer	
25	CB	(Malaysia) Faris Shah	(Malaysia) Melaka United	4 June 2018	Free transfer	
21	DM	(Senegal) Morgaro Gomis	(Oman) Sur	17 June 2018	Released	
11	CF	(Namibia) Lazarus Kaimbi	Unattached	19 June 2018	Released	

== Pre-season and friendlies ==
3 December 2017 Friendly	Kelantan	1–0	Jeli	Kota Bharu
16:00 MYT				Stadium: Sultan Muhammad IV Stadium

24 December 2017 Friendly	Kelantan	4–0	MPKB-BRI U-BeS	Pengkalan Chepa
17:00 MYT	Hakim; Sukri; Nik Azli			Stadium: 21 RAMD Field

27 December 2017 Friendly	Kelantan	0–0	Terengganu II	Kota Bharu
21:00 MYT				Stadium: Sultan Muhammad IV Stadium

10 January 2018 Friendly	Kelantan	0–0	PKNP	Kota Bharu
21:00 MYT				Stadium: Sultan Muhammad IV Stadium

18 January 2018 Friendly	Petaling Jaya Rangers	0–2	Kelantan	Petaling Jaya
20:45 MYT			Haikal; Veenod	Stadium: Petaling Jaya Stadium

24 January 2018 Friendly	Kelantan	2–2	Marcerra United	Kota Bharu
21:00 MYT	Dong 45'; Ferdinand 68'		Azmi 52' ? 90' (pen.)	Stadium: Sultan Muhammad IV Stadium

27 January 2018 Friendly	Buriram United (Thailand)	3–1	Kelantan	Narathiwat
17:00 MYT	? 25' (pen.) ? 45' ? 65'		Lopes 52'	Stadium: Maharaj Stadium

4 April 2018 Friendly	Terengganu II	1–1	Kelantan	Terengganu
20:45 MYT	Sahrin Shapein 89'		Dong 45+'	Stadium: Sultan Mizan Zainal Abidin Stadium

=== Super Cup ===
On 8 December 2017, it was announced that Kelantan would face Persija Jakarta of Indonesia and Ratchaburi of Thailand as part of the 2018 Boost SportsFix Super Cup, a round-robin tournament. All matches played at the National Stadium, Bukit Jalil, Kuala Lumpur.

16 January 2018 Super Cup	Kelantan	1–0	(Indonesia) Persija Jakarta	Kuala Lumpur
20:00 MYT	Lopes 76' (pen.)			Stadium: Bukit Jalil National Stadium; Referee: Zulkarnain Zakaria

20 January 2018 Super Cup	Kelantan	3–4	(Thailand) Ratchaburi	Kuala Lumpur
20:00 MYT	Dong 20'; Lopes 74'; Ferdinand 78'	Report	Kang Soo-il 10'; Narakorn 36'; Roller 55'; Sila 89'	Stadium: Bukit Jalil National Stadium; Referee: Fitri Maskon

== Competitions ==
=== Malaysia Super League ===
==== League table ====
Pos	Team	Pld	W	D	L	GF	GA	GD	Pts	Qualification or relegation
8	Selangor	22	7	6	9	35	39	−4	27	
9	PKNP	22	7	4	11	25	31	−6	25	
10	Kuala Lumpur	22	7	3	12	39	51	−12	24	
11	Kelantan (R)	22	5	3	14	20	43	−23	18	Relegation to the Premier League
12	Negeri Sembilan (R)	22	4	3	15	27	47	−20	15	Relegation to the Premier League

Source: FAM, FMLLP
Rules for classification: 1) Points; 2) Goal difference; 3) Number of goals scored.
(R) Relegated

==== Result summary ====
Overall								Home						Away					
Pld	W	D	L	GF	GA	GD	Pts	W	D	L	GF	GA	GD	W	D	L	GF	GA	GD
22	5	3	14	20	43	−23	18	4	2	5	15	17	−2	1	1	9	5	26	−21

Last updated: 29 July 2018.
Source: Soccerway

==== Results by matchday ====
Matchday	1	2	3	4	5	6	7	8	9	10	11	12	13	14	15	16	17	18	19	20	21	22
Ground	A	H	A	H	A	A	H	A	H	A	A	H	A	A	H	H	A	H	H	A	A	H
Result	L	D	L	W	L	D	L	L	W	L	L	L	L	W	L	L	L	W	D	L	L	W
Position	10	9	12	10	11	11	11	11	11	11	11	11	11	12	12	12	12	11	11	12	12	11

Updated to match(es) played on 29 July 2018. Source: Soccerway
A = Away; H = Home; W = Win; D = Draw; L = Loss

==== Matches ====
Win Draw Loss

The fixtures for the 2018 Malaysia Super League season were announced on 11 January 2018.

3 February 2018 1	Melaka United	2–1	Kelantan	Krubong
21:00 MYT	Zubovich 11'; Jeon 31' (pen.), (yellow card) 90+6'	Report	Lopes 2'; Ferdinand (yellow card) 90+6'	Stadium: Hang Jebat Stadium; Referee: Zulkarnain Zakaria

6 February 2018 2	Kelantan	1–1	Terengganu	Kota Bharu
21:00 MYT	Dong 39' (pen.); Ferdinand (yellow card) 50'; Gomis (yellow card) 90+1'	Report	Kipré 1'; Aizad (yellow card) 32'; Fitri (yellow card) 39'	Stadium: Sultan Muhammad IV Stadium; Referee: Nazmi Nasaruddin

10 February 2018 3	Pahang	3–0	Kelantan	Kuantan
21:00 MYT	Doe 13'; Safuwan (yellow card) 48'; Sumareh 55'; Azam 87'	Report	Dong (yellow card) 39'	Stadium: Darul Makmur Stadium; Referee: Suhaimi Mat Hassan

24 February 2018 4	Kelantan	3–2	Perak	Kota Bharu
21:00 MYT	Dong 68', 77', 88', (yellow card) 89'; Ghaddar (yellow card) 90+1'; Fahmi (yellow card) 90+1'	Report	Hakim 22'; Wander 69'; Khairil (yellow card) 90+1'	Stadium: Sultan Muhammad IV Stadium; Attendance: 5,381; Referee: Fitri Maskon; Man of the Match: Do Dong-hyun

9 March 2018 5	PKNS	1–0	Kelantan	Shah Alam
21:00 MYT	Faris 39'; Akwensivie (yellow card) 69'	Report	Nik Shahrul (yellow card) 77'; Azwan (yellow card) 79'	Stadium: Shah Alam Stadium; Attendance: 8,492; Referee: Khairul Azuan Kidam

14 April 2018 6	Negeri Sembilan	1–1	Kelantan	Paroi
21:00 MYT	Júnior 8'; Hazrul (yellow card) 85'; Nasriq (yellow card) 90+2'	Report	Azwan (yellow card) 43'; Nik Akif 90+5'	Stadium: Tuanku Abdul Rahman Stadium; Attendance: 5,657; Referee: Suhaizi Shukri

28 April 2018 7	Kelantan	1–2	Johor Darul Ta'zim	Kota Bharu
21:00 MYT	Ghaddar 12'; Nik Azli (yellow card) 16'	Report	Safiq 37' (pen.), (yellow card) 45'; Insa 83'; Syafiq (yellow card) 89'; Marcos António (yellow card) 90+4'	Stadium: Sultan Muhammad IV Stadium; Referee: Zulkarnain Zakaria

2 May 2018 8	PKNP	2–0	Kelantan	Penang
21:00 MYT	Hafiz 26'; Krjauklis 30'	Report	Nik Shahrul (yellow card) 66'; Farisham (yellow card) 74'	Stadium: Penang State Stadium; Attendance: 1,255; Referee: Wan Mohamad Tarmizi

5 May 2018 9	Kelantan	4–2	Kuala Lumpur	Kota Bharu
21:00 MYT	Nik Azli 10', (yellow card) 68'; Shafiq 17', 69'; Nik Akif 89'; Syaiful (yellow card) 90+1'	Report	Zhafri (yellow card) 42', (goal) 90+2'; Indra Putra 80'	Stadium: Sultan Muhammad IV Stadium; Referee: Mohd Amirul Izwan Yaacob

11 May 2018 10	Kelantan	1–2	PKNP	Kota Bharu
21:00 MYT	Haqim (yellow card) 73'; Imran 74'	Report	Hafiz 61'; Shahrel 83'; Ridzuan (yellow card) 90+6'	Stadium: Sultan Muhammad IV Stadium; Attendance: 13,821; Referee: Razlan Jeffri Ali

22 May 2018 11	Kuala Lumpur	5–1	Kelantan	Kuala Lumpur
22:00 MYT	De Paula 4', 23'; Josué 10', (yellow card) 12'; Irfan (yellow card) 13'; Zhafri (yellow card) 55'; Ashri 78'; Juninho 83'	Report	Shafiq 16'; Haqim (yellow card) 61'; Azwan (yellow card) 75'	Stadium: KLFA Stadium; Attendance: 2,096; Referee: Suhaimi Mat Hassan

26 May 2018 12	Kelantan	0–2	Negeri Sembilan	Paroi
22:00 MYT	Haqim (yellow card) 51'	Report	Moraes 17', (yellow card) 59'; Guirado 38' (pen.); Júnior (yellow card) 43'; Faizal (yellow card) 90'	Stadium: Tuanku Abdul Rahman Stadium; Referee: Muhd Rahmat Jantan

1 June 2018 13	Selangor	4–0	Kelantan	Kuala Lumpur
22:00 MYT	Rufino 31', 36', 82'; Evan 38'; Saiful (yellow card) 89'	Report	Fakhrul (yellow card) 86'	Stadium: KLFA Stadium; Referee: Mohd Nafeez Abdul Wahab

5 June 2018 14	Kedah	1–2	Kelantan	Alor Setar
22:00 MYT	Paulo 26' (pen.); Sandro (yellow card) 83'	Report	Nik Azli 56'; Danial 60'; Nik Akif (yellow card) 90+2'	Stadium: Darul Aman Stadium; Referee: Nagor Amir Noor Mohamed

8 June 2018 15	Kelantan	0–1	Kedah	Alor Setar
22:00 MYT	Khairul (yellow card) 20' (yellow-red card) 90+6'; Duyshobekov (yellow card) 61'	Report	Rizal (yellow card) 29'; Paulo 45+1'; Andik (yellow card) 90+5'	Stadium: Darul Aman Stadium; Referee: Wan Mohamad Tarmizi

19 June 2018 16	Kelantan	0–2	PKNS	Kota Bharu
21:00 MYT		Report	Matos 4', 87'; Sivakumar (yellow card) 78'; Mahali (yellow card) 90+4'	Stadium: Sultan Muhammad IV Stadium; Referee: Mohd Amirul Izwan Yaacob

26 June 2018 17	Perak	1–0	Kelantan	Ipoh
21:00 MYT	Leandro 70' (pen.)	Report	Haziq (yellow card) 27'; Haqim (yellow card) 35'	Stadium: Perak Stadium; Referee: Nagor Amir Noor Mohamed

11 July 2018 18	Kelantan	2–1	Selangor	Kota Bharu
21:00 MYT	Shafiq 35'; Cássio (yellow card) 77'; Danial 86'; Fakhrul (yellow card) 88'	Report	Halim (yellow card) 71'; Sean 78'	Stadium: Sultan Muhammad IV Stadium; Referee: Fitri Maskon

14 July 2018 19	Kelantan	1–1	Melaka United	Kota Bharu
21:00 MYT	Shafiq 11'	Report	Faris (yellow card) 45+2'; Zubovich 90+3' (pen.)	Stadium: Sultan Muhammad IV Stadium; Referee: Suresh Jayaraman

20 July 2018 20	Johor Darul Ta'zim	4–0	Kelantan	Larkin
21:00 MYT	Elizari 52'; Afiq 56'; Safawi 80'; Safiq 87' (pen.)	Report		Stadium: Tan Sri Dato' Haji Hassan Yunos Stadium; Referee: Wan Mohamad Tarmizi

23 July 2018 21	Terengganu	2–0	Kelantan	Kuala Terengganu
21:00 MYT	Bin (yellow card) 17'; Tchétché 44'; Kamal 54'; Tuck (yellow card) 62'	Report	Santos (yellow card) 61'	Stadium: Sultan Ismail Nasiruddin Shah Stadium; Referee: Nazmi Nasaruddin

29 July 2018 22	Kelantan	2–1	Pahang	Kota Bharu
21:00 MYT	Nik Akif (yellow card) 36'; Danial 42'; Shafiq 77'	Report	Bunyamin (yellow card) 9'; Amutu 65'	Stadium: Sultan Muhammad IV Stadium; Referee: Zulkarnain Zakaria

=== Malaysia FA Cup ===
Kelantan entered the 2018 Malaysia FA Cup in the second round as all 12 Malaysia Super League clubs received a bye to that stage. Matches were played between 2–3 March 2018.

Win Draw Loss

2 March 2018 Second round	Kelantan	2–0	Terengganu City	Kota Bharu
21:00 MYT	Cássio 24'; Azwan (yellow card) 37'; Shafiq 74'	Report	Shafiqqudin (yellow card) 44'	Stadium: Sultan Muhammad IV Stadium; Referee: Almi Abdullah

17 March 2018 Third round	PKNS	4–1	Kelantan	Shah Alam
21:00 MYT	Morales 15' (pen.); Mahali 42'; Safee 60'; Ramazotti 65'	Report	Farisham (yellow card) 30'; Ghaddar 90' (pen.)	Stadium: Shah Alam Stadium; Referee: Nazmi Nasaruddin

=== Malaysia Cup ===
==== Group stage ====
Pos	Team	Pld	W	D	L	GF	GA	GD	Pts	Qualification	JDT	KEL	MIFA	KED
1	Johor Darul Ta'zim	6	3	0	3	11	7	+4	9	Advance to knockout stage	—	1–0	1–2	5–1
2	Kelantan	6	2	2	2	3	3	0	8	Advance to knockout stage	1–0	—	0–0	2–0
3	MISC-MIFA	6	2	2	2	8	9	−1	8		0–3	2–0	—	2–2
4	Kedah	6	2	2	2	9	12	−3	8		3–1	0–0	3–2	—

Updated to match(es) played on 16 September 2018. Source: FAM FMLLP

Win Draw Loss

5 August 2018 1	Kedah	0–0	Kelantan	Alor Setar
21:00 MYT		Report	Haqim (yellow card) 33'; Shafiq (yellow card) 78'	Stadium: Darul Aman Stadium; Referee: Zulkarnain Zakaria

10 August 2018 2	MISC-MIFA	2–0	Kelantan	Petaling Jaya
21:00 MYT	Sherman 25' (pen.), (yellow card) 73'; Satrunan 75'; Tinagaran (yellow card) 80'	Report	Imran (yellow card) 68'; Haziq (yellow card) 73'; Santos (yellow card) 80'	Stadium: Petaling Jaya Stadium; Referee: Mohd Zohri Tajuddin

17 August 2018 3	Kelantan	1–0	Johor Darul Ta'zim	Kota Bharu
21:00 MYT	Haqim (yellow card) 6' (yellow-red card) 90+3'; Santos (yellow card) 42' (yellow-red card) 90+5', (goal) 45+3' (pen.); Danial (yellow card) 74'; Nizam (yellow card) 76'; Haziq (yellow card) 83'	Report	Insa (yellow card) 16'; Marcos António (yellow card) 90+1'; Cabrera (yellow card) 90+6'	Stadium: Sultan Muhammad IV Stadium; Referee: Suhaimi Mat Hassan

25 August 2018 4	Johor Darul Ta'zim	1–0	Kelantan	Larkin
21:00 MYT	Márquez 65', (yellow card) 66'	Report		Stadium: Tan Sri Dato' Haji Hassan Yunos Stadium; Referee: Zulkarnain Zakaria

31 August 2018 5	Kelantan	0–0	MISC-MIFA	Kota Bharu
21:00 MYT	Nik Akif (yellow card) 39'; Farisham (yellow card) 84'	Report	Elizeu (yellow card) 68'	Stadium: Sultan Muhammad IV Stadium; Referee: Razlan Joffri Ali

16 September 2018 6	Kelantan	2–0	Kedah	Kota Bharu
21:00 MYT	Ashraf 45'; Nik Akif 90+2'			Stadium: Sultan Muhammad IV Stadium

==== Knockout phase ====
===== Quarter-finals =====
22 September 2018 First leg	Kelantan	2–1	Sabah	Kota Bharu
21:00 UTC+8	Duyshobekov 29'; Nik Akif 45+1' (pen.)		Hamran Peter 43'	Stadium: Sultan Muhammad IV Stadium; Referee: Zamzaidi Katimin

29 September 2018 Second leg	Sabah	1–0	Kelantan	Kota Kinabalu
20:15 UTC+8	Paunovic 31' (pen.)			Stadium: Likas Stadium

== Statistics ==
=== Appearances ===
No.	Pos.	Name	League		FA Cup		Malaysia Cup		Total		Discipline	
No.	Pos.	Name	Apps	Goals	Apps	Goals	Apps	Goals	Apps	Goals	Yellow card	Red card
1	GK	(Malaysia) Shahrizan Ismail	8	–10	0	0	0	0	8	–10	0	0
4	DF	(Brazil) Cássio	21	0	2	1	8	0	31	1	0	0
6	DF	(Malaysia) Farisham Ismail	8(1)	0	2	0	8	0	18(1)	0	2	0
7	FW	(Malaysia) Fakhrul Zaman	9(5)	0	0	0	1(1)	0	10(6)	0	2	0
8	FW	(Malaysia) Shafiq Shaharudin	11(5)	6	0(2)	1	4(2)	0	15(9)	7	0	0
9	FW	(Brazil) Cristiano Santos	7	0	0	0	5(1)	1	13(1)	1	4	2
12	DF	(Malaysia) Haziq Puad	9(1)	0	0	0	4(2)	0	13(3)	0	3	0
13	DF	(Malaysia) Azwan Aripin	19	0	2	0	6(1)	0	27(1)	0	3	0
15	DF	(Malaysia) Khairul Asyraf	7(6)	0	1	0	1	0	9(6)	0	1	1
17	MF	(Kyrgyzstan) Bakhtiyar Duyshobekov	9	0	0	0	8	1	17	1	1	0
18	MF	(Malaysia) Amir Zikri	0(1)	0	0	0	0(1)	0	0(2)	0	0	0
20	MF	(Malaysia) Haikal Nazri	5(3)	0	0(1)	0	1(1)	0	6(5)	0	0	0
22	GK	(Malaysia) Faridzuean Kamaruddin	1	+1	0	0	8	0	9	+1	0	0
26	MF	(Malaysia) Fadhilah Pauzi	2	0	0	0	0	0	2	0	0	0
27	FW	(Malaysia) Khairul Rizam	3(2)	0	0	0	6(1)	0	9(3)	0	0	0
28	DF	(Malaysia) Faizol Nazlin	0(1)	0	0	0	0	0	0(1)	0	0	0
32	FW	(Malaysia) Nik Azli	8(6)	2	0	0	2(2)	0	10(8)	2	1	0
33	MF	(Malaysia) Nik Akif Syahiran	15(3)	2	0(2)	0	4	2	19(5)	4	3	0
34	MF	(Malaysia) Danial Haqim	15(1)	0	0	0	4	0	18(1)	0	3	1
35	GK	(Malaysia) Fikri Che Soh	8	–12	0	0	0	0	8	–12	0	0
36	MF	(Malaysia) Syaiful Alias	2(2)	0	0	0	2(2)	0	4(4)	0	0	0
37	MF	(Malaysia) Danial Ashraf	8(5)	3	0	0	5(1)	1	13(6)	4	1	0
38	FW	(Malaysia) Imran Samso	7(4)	1	0	0	6(1)	0	13(4)	1	1	0
39	FW	(Malaysia) Afiq Saluddin	1(4)	0	0	0	0	0	1(4)	0	0	0
40	MF	(Malaysia) Shahrul Nizam	7(1)	0	0	0	6	0	13(1)	0	1	0
43	FW	(Malaysia) Ivaan Hakimi	0	0	0	0	0(5)	0	0(5)	0	0	0
Players who left the club in mid season transfer window or on loan
3	DF	(Malaysia) Tengku Qayyum	0	0	0	0	0	0	0	0	0	0
5	DF	(Malaysia) Nik Shahrul Azim	7(2)	0	1(1)	0	0	0	8(3)	0	1	0
11	FW	(Namibia) Lazarus Kaimbi	2	0	0	0	0	0	2	0	0	0
10	MF	(South Korea) Do Dong-hyun	6	4	1	0	0	0	7	4	2	0
12	MF	(Malaysia) Sukri Hamid	1(1)	0	0	0	0	0	1(1)	0	0	0
14	MF	(Malaysia) Rozaimi Azwar	0	0	0	0	0	0	0	0	0	0
16	MF	(Malaysia) Badhri Radzi	2	0	2	0	0	0	4	0	0	0
17	FW	(Indonesia) Ferdinand Sinaga	5	0	1	0	0	0	6	0	2	0
19	GK	(Malaysia) Khairul Fahmi	4	–3	2	–1	0	0	6	–4	1	0
21	MF	(Senegal) Morgaro Gomis	2	0	0	0	0	0	2	0	1	0
22	FW	(Lebanon) Mohammed Ghaddar	5	1	2	1	0	0	7	2	1	0
23	MF	(Malaysia) S. Veenod	2(1)	0	2	0	0	0	4(1)	0	0	0
24	DF	(Malaysia) Amirizdwan Taj	2	0	0	0	0	0	2	0	0	0
29	FW	(Malaysia) Zul Fahmi Awang	0	0	0	0	0	0	0	0	0	0
9	FW	(Brazil) Bruno Lopes	5	1	2	0	0	0	7	1	0	0
11	MF	(Malaysia) Nor Farhan	0(5)	0	2	0	0	0	2(5)	0	0	0
25	DF	(Malaysia) Faris Shah	3	0	0	0	0	0	3	0	0	0
30	GK	(Malaysia) Ramadhan Hamid	1	–1	0	0	0	0	1	–1	0	0
3	DF	(Tunisia) Alaeddine Bouslimi	2	0	0	0	0	0	2	0	0	0

Last updated: 29 September 2018.
Source: Soccerway

=== Top scorers ===
The list is sorted by shirt number when total goals are equal.
† Players who left the club in mid season.

Rnk	Pos	No.	Player	League	FA Cup	Malaysia Cup	Total
1	FW	8	(Malaysia) Shafiq Shaharudin	6	1	0	7
2	MF	10	(South Korea) Do Dong-hyun †	4	0	0	4
2	MF	33	(Malaysia) Nik Akif Syahiran	2	0	2	4
2	MF	37	(Malaysia) Danial Ashraf	3	0	1	4
5	FW	22	(Lebanon) Mohammed Ghaddar †	1	1	0	2
5	FW	32	(Malaysia) Nik Azli	2	0	0	2
7	DF	4	(Brazil) Cássio	0	1	0	1
7	FW	9	(Brazil) Cristiano Santos	0	0	1	1
7	FW	9	(Brazil) Bruno Lopes †	1	0	0	1
7	MF	17	(Kyrgyzstan) Bakhtiyar Duyshobekov	0	0	1	1
7	FW	38	(Malaysia) Imran Samso	1	0	0	1
#	Own goals			0	0	0	0
Total				20	3	5	28

Last updated: 22 September 2018.
Source: Soccerway

=== Top assists ===
The list is sorted by shirt number when total goals are equal.
† Players who left the club in mid season.

Rnk	Pos	No.	Player	League	FA Cup	Malaysia Cup	Total
1	FW	7	(Malaysia) Fakhrul Zaman	3	0	0	3
1	MF	16	(Malaysia) Badhri Radzi †	2	1	0	3
3	FW	32	(Malaysia) Nik Azli	2	0	0	2
3	MF	34	(Malaysia) Danial Haqim	2	0	0	2
3	MF	37	(Malaysia) Danial Ashraf	2	0	1	3
7	DF	5	(Malaysia) Nik Shahrul Azim †	1	0	0	1
7	FW	9	(Brazil) Bruno Lopes †	0	1	0	1
7	MF	10	(South Korea) Do Dong-hyun †	1	0	0	1
7	MF	11	(Malaysia) Nor Farhan †	1	0	0	1
7	FW	11	(Namibia) Lazarus Kaimbi †	1	0	0	1
7	DF	15	(Malaysia) Khairul Asyraf	1	0	0	1
7	MF	17	(Kyrgyzstan) Bakhtiyar Duyshobekov	1	0	0	1
7	MF	20	(Malaysia) Haikal Nazri	1	0	0	1
7	FW	27	(Malaysia) Khairul Rizam	0	0	2	2
7	MF	33	(Malaysia) Nik Akif	0	0	1	1
7	FW	38	(Malaysia) Imran Samso	1	0	1	2
7	Unassisted goals			1	1	0	2
Total				20	3	5	28

Last updated: 22 September 2018.
Source: Soccerway

=== Clean sheets ===
The list is sorted by shirt number when total clean sheets are equal.
† Players who left the club in mid season.

Rnk	No.	Player	League	FA Cup	Malaysia Cup	Total
1	22	(Malaysia) Faridzuean Kamaruddin	0	0	4	4
2	19	(Malaysia) Khairul Fahmi †	0	1	0	1
3	30	(Malaysia) Ramadhan Hamid †	0	0	0	0
3	35	(Malaysia) Fikri Che Soh	0	0	0	0

Last updated: 22 September 2018.
Source: Soccerway

=== Summary ===

Malaysia Super League first match starting lineup Melaka United 2 – 1 Kelantan

Games played	32 (22 Super League) (2 FA Cup) (8 Malaysia Cup)
Games won	9 (5 Super League) (1 FA Cup) (3 Malaysia Cup)
Games drawn	5 (3 Super League) (2 Malaysia Cup)
Games lost	18 (14 Super League) (1 FA Cup) (3 Malaysia Cup)
Goals scored	28 (20 Super League) (3 FA Cup) (5 Malaysia Cup)
Goals conceded	52 (43 Super League) (4 FA Cup) (5 Malaysia Cup)
Goal difference	–26 (–23 Super League) (–2 FA Cup) (–1 Malaysia Cup)
Clean sheets	4 (1 FA Cup) (4 Malaysia Cup)
Yellow cards	35 (29 Super League) (1 FA Cup) (12 Malaysia Cup)
Red cards	4 (1 Super League) (3 Malaysia Cup)
Most appearances	(Brazil) Cássio (31 appearances)
Top scorer	(Malaysia) Shafiq Shaharudin (7 goals)
Winning Percentage	Overall: 9/32 (29.03%)

Last updated: 29 September 2018.
Source: Soccerway

== Home attendance ==
Match no.	Date	Opponent (Score)	Competition	Attendance	References
1	6 February 2018	Terengganu (1–1)	Malaysia Super League		
4	24 February 2018	Perak (3–2)	Malaysia Super League	5,381	
Second round	2 March 2018	Terengganu City (2–0)	Malaysia FA Cup		

== U21s ==
22 February 2018 1	Selangor U21s	1−3	Kelantan U21s	Cyberjaya
16:45 UTC+8	Asyraf Haikal		Nik Azli; Redzuan Hakim; Imran Samso	Stadium: MMU Stadium

1 March 2018 2	Kelantan U21s	0−1	Johor Darul Ta'zim III	Kota Bharu
16:45 UTC+8				Stadium: Sultan Muhammad IV Stadium

9 March 2018 3	Kelantan U21s	1−1	Kedah U21s	Kota Bharu
16:45 UTC+8	Nik Azli			Stadium: Sultan Muhammad IV Stadium

12 March 2018 4	Pahang U21s	3–3	Kelantan U21s	Temerloh
16:45 UTC+8			Nik Azli Nik Alias 1', 34'; Danial Ashraf 79'	Stadium: Temerloh Mini Stadium

== U19s ==
21 February 2018 1	Kelantan U19s	2–0	UiTM U19s	Kota Bharu
16:45 UTC+8				Stadium: Sultan Muhammad IV Stadium

25 February 2018 2	Perak U19s	0−1	Kelantan U19s	Tanjong Malim
16:45 UTC+8			Wan Azran 69'	Stadium: UPSI Mini Stadium

28 February 2018 3	Kelantan U19s	3−0	Johor Darul Ta'zim IV	Kota Bharu
16:45 UTC+8	Juzaerul Jasmi 41'; Fazrul Amir 32'; Amsyar Rosli 69'			Stadium: Sultan Muhammad IV Stadium

25 March 2018 4	SSTMI U17	2−0	Kelantan U19s	Kota Tinggi
16:45 UTC+8				Stadium: Padang B

Source: FAM
