= Cássio de Jesus =

Brazilian footballer (1989–2025)

Personal information
- Full name: Cássio Francisco de Jesus
- Date of birth: 21 November 1989
- Place of birth: São Paulo, Brazil
- Date of death: 4 March 2025 (aged 35)
- Place of death: Brazil
- Height: 1.86 m (6 ft 1 in)
- Position: Centre-back

Youth career
- 2007: Olímpia
- 2007–2008: Guarani B

Senior career*
Years	Team	Apps	(Gls)
2009–2010	Guarani	19	(0)
2009	→ Mogi Mirim (loan)	17	(2)
2009	Concórdia	14	(0)
2010	São Carlos	24	(4)
2011	Tombense	15	(0)
2012	Mamoré	26	(0)
2013	CAP Uberlândia	20	(0)
2014	Flamengo	7	(0)
2014	Ituiutabana	11	(0)
2015	Araxá	16	(0)
2016–2017	Semen Padang	62	(2)
2018–2019	Kelantan	27	(0)
2019–2021	Barito Putera	24	(1)
2022	Hong Kong Rangers	6	(1)
2024	Navy	7	(1)
Total		295	(11)

International career
2007	Brazil U20		
- * Club domestic league appearances and goals

Cássio Francisco de Jesus (21 November 1989 – 4 March 2025) was a Brazilian professional footballer who played as a centre-back.

== Club career ==
=== Semen Padang ===
In April 2016, Cássio signed a contract with Indonesian side Semen Padang and played for 2016 and 2017 season. He made over 60 appearances over two seasons playing for the club.

He was included by FourFourTwo Indonesia in Best XI of Liga 1 July 2017 and was regarded as one of the best central defenders in Indonesian Liga 1.

=== Kelantan ===
On 3 December 2017, Cássio signed a one-year contract with an option for another year with Malaysian side Kelantan. On 3 February 2018, he made his league debut for Kelantan in 2–1 defeat to Melaka United at Hang Jebat Stadium.

=== Rangers ===
On 17 August 2022, Cássio joined Hong Kong Premier League club Rangers.

== Death ==
Cássio died from aplastic anemia on 4 March 2025, at the age of 35.

== Career statistics ==
=== Club ===
Appearances and goals by club, season and competition
Club	Season	League			National cup (Note: Includes the Indonesian Kaltim Cup and Copa do Brasil)		League cup		Continental		Total	
Club	Season	Division	Apps	Goals	Apps	Goals	Apps	Goals	Apps	Goals	Apps	Goals
Guarani	2009	Série A1	5	0	—		—		—		5	0
Guarani	2010	Série A2	14	0	4	0	—		—		18	0
Guarani	Total		19	0	4	0	0	0	0	0	23	0
Concórdia	2011	Catarinense	7	0	—		—		—		7	0
Tombense	2011–12		14	0	0	0	0	0	—		14	0
Mamoré	2011–12		0	0	0	0	0	0	—		0	0
Mamoré	2011–12		0	0	0	0	0	0	—		0	0
Mamoré	2012–13		0	0	0	0	0	0	—		0	0
Mamoré	Total		0	0	0	0	0	0	0	0	0	0
Flamengo	2014	Série A3	7	0	—		—		—		7	0
Araxá	2015		0	0	0	0	0	0	—		0	0
Semen Padang	2016	Indonesia Soccer Championship	29	1	3	0	0	0	—		32	1
Semen Padang	2017	Liga 1	33	1	0	0	0	0	—		33	1
Semen Padang	Total		62	2	3	0	0	0	0	0	65	2
Kelantan	2018	Malaysia Super League	21	0	2	1	8	0	—		33	1
Kelantan	2019	Malaysia Premier League	6	0	0	0	0	0	—		6	0
Kelantan	Total		27	0	2	1	8	0	0	0	39	1
Barito Putera	2019	Liga 1	15	0	0	0	0	0	—		15	0
Barito Putera	2020	Liga 1	3	0	0	0	0	0	—		3	0
Barito Putera	2021–22	Liga 1	6	1	0	0	0	0	—		6	1
Barito Putera	Total		24	1	0	0	0	0	0	0	24	1
Career total			0	0	0	0	0	0	0	0	0	0

== Honours ==
Guarani

- Série B runner-up: 2009
