= Shafiq Shaharudin =

Malaysian footballer

Personal information
- Full name: Shafiq bin Shaharudin
- Date of birth: 26 March 1994 (age 32)
- Place of birth: Batu Pahat, Johor, Malaysia
- Height: 1.74 m (5 ft 8 1/2 in)
- Position: Forward

Team information
- Current team: Kelantan
- Number: 22

Youth career
- 2013: Johor Darul Ta'zim IV

Senior career*
Years	Team	Apps	(Gls)
2014–2017	Johor Darul Ta'zim II	46	(24)
2018	Kelantan	16	(6)
2019–2020	PKNS		
2019	→ Kuala Lumpur (loan)	4	(0)
2021	Kuching City		
2022	Tun Razak City		(12)
2023–	Kelantan	0	(0)

International career^{‡}
2015	Malaysia U23		
2018	Malaysia	1	(0)
- * Club domestic league appearances and goals as of 19 July 2021 ‡ National team caps and goals as of 5 July 2018

Shafiq bin Shaharudin (born 26 March 1994) is a Malaysian professional footballer who plays as a forward for Malaysia Super League club Kelantan.

Born in Batu Pahat, Johor, Shafiq started his career playing for Johor youth team.

== Club career ==
=== Johor Darul Ta'zim II ===
Shafiq began his career with Johor youth team before been promoted to Johor Darul Ta'zim II in 2014.

=== Kelantan ===
In December 2017, Shafiq signed a two-year contract with Kelantan.

== International career ==
On 5 July 2018, Shafiq made his debut for Malaysia national team in a 1–0 win over Fiji.

== Career statistics ==
=== Club ===
As of match played 29 July 2018.

Appearances and goals by club, season and competition
Club	Season	League			Cup		League Cup		Continental		Other		Total	
Club	Season	Division	Apps	Goals	Apps	Goals	Apps	Goals	Apps	Goals	Apps	Goals	Apps	Goals
Johor Darul Ta'zim II	2014	Malaysia Premier League	3	0	0	0	6	2	–		0	0	0	2
Johor Darul Ta'zim II	2015	Malaysia Premier League	19	7	3	0	5	0	–		1 (Note: Appearance in 2015 Malaysia Cup play-off)	1	28	8
Johor Darul Ta'zim II	2016	Malaysia Premier League	15	4	1	0	1	0	–		0	0	17	4
Johor Darul Ta'zim II	2017	Malaysia Premier League	9	3	0	0	0	0	–		0	0	9	3
Johor Darul Ta'zim II	Total		46	14	4	0	12	2	–		1	1	63	17
Kelantan	2018	Malaysia Super League	16	6	2	1	0	0	–		0	0	18	7
Kelantan	Total		16	6	2	1	0	0	–		0	0	18	7
Career Total			62	20	6	1	12	2	–	–	1	1	81	24

=== International ===
As of 11 July 2018

Malaysia national team
Year	Apps	Goals
2018	1	0
Total	1	0

== Personal life ==
Shaharuddin Abdullah, his father also former Malaysia national player.
