= Khairul Asyraf =

Malaysian footballer

Personal information
- Full name: Mohamad Khairul Asyraf bin Ramli
- Date of birth: 31 December 1994 (age 31)
- Place of birth: Kelantan, Malaysia
- Height: 1.76 m (5 ft 9 1/2 in)
- Positions: Defensive midfielder; centre back

Team information
- Current team: Kelantan WTS
- Number: 37

Youth career
- 2015: Felda United U21

Senior career*
Years	Team	Apps	(Gls)
2016	DRB-Hicom	7	(0)
2017	PKNP	3	(0)
2018–2020	Kelantan	37	(0)
2021–2022	Penang	6	(0)
2022–2024	Perak	5	(0)
2024–2025	→ PT Athletic (loan)		
2025–	Kelantan WTS		
- * Club domestic league appearances and goals

Mohamad Khairul Asyraf bin Ramli (born 31 December 1994) is a Malaysian footballer who plays for Kelantan WTS as a defender.

== Club career ==
=== Kelantan ===
In December 2017, Khairul Asyraf signed a two-year contract with Malaysia Super League side Kelantan after his contract with PKNP expired.

== Career statistics ==
=== Club ===
As of match played 21 July 2022

Appearances and goals by club, season and competition
Club	Season	League			Cup		League Cup		Continental		Total	
Club	Season	Division	Apps	Goals	Apps	Goals	Apps	Goals	Apps	Goals	Apps	Goals
DRB-Hicom	2016	Malaysia Premier League	7	0	1	0	0	0	–	–	8	0
PKNP	2017	Malaysia Premier League	3	0	1	1	1	0	–	–	5	1
Kelantan	2018	Malaysia Super League	14	0	1	0	0	0	–	–	15	0
Kelantan	2019	Malaysia Premier League	14	0	0	0	3	0	–	–	17	0
Kelantan	2020	Malaysia Premier League	9	0	–	–	1	0	–	–	10	0
Kelantan	Total		37	0	1	0	4	0	–	–	42	0
Penang	2021	Malaysia Super League	6	0	–	–	4	0	–	–	10	0
Perak	2022	Malaysia Premier League	5	0	–	–	0	0	–	–	5	0
Career Total			58	0	3	1	9	0	–	–	70	1
