= Nik Azli =

Malaysian footballer

Personal information
- Full name: Nik Azli bin Nik Alias
- Date of birth: 26 January 1997 (age 29)
- Place of birth: Tumpat, Kelantan, Malaysia
- Height: 1.73 m (5 ft 8 in)
- Positions: Forward; winger

Team information
- Current team: Kelantan Red Warrior
- Number: 32

Youth career
- 2014: Harimau Muda B
- 2015: Harimau Muda C
- 2014–2017: Kelantan U-21

Senior career*
Years	Team	Apps	(Gls)
2017–2020	Kelantan	36	(6)
2022–2024	Kelantan United	17	(0)
2024	PIB		
2025–	Kelantan Red Warrior	0	(0)

International career^{‡}
2013–2014	Malaysia U-17	12	(9)
2015–2016	Malaysia U-19	4	(2)
2018	Malaysia U-21	1	(1)
- * Club domestic league appearances and goals as of 22 August 205 ‡ National team caps and goals as of 22 July 2017

Nik Azli bin Nik Alias (born 26 January 1997) is a Malaysian professional footballer who plays for Malaysia A1 Semi-Pro League club Kelantan Red Warrior. Nik Azli plays mainly as a forward, but can also play as a winger.

== Club career ==
=== Kelantan ===
In May 2017, during second window transfer, Nik Azli has been promoted to play with the senior team from Kelantan U-21. Nik Azli made his competitive League debut on 1 July 2017 in a match that ended in a 0–2 defeat by Sarawak at the Sultan Muhammad IV Stadium in Kelantan's 14th match of the 2017 season.

== International career ==
Nik Azli began his international career at youth level playing for the Malaysian under-19 team. He played during the 2015 AFF U-19 Youth Championship and made 3 appearances.

== Career statistics ==
=== Club ===
As of 20 July 2019

Appearances and goals by club, season and competition
Club	Season	League			Cup		League Cup		Continental		Total	
Club	Season	Division	Apps	Goals	Apps	Goals	Apps	Goals	Apps	Goals	Apps	Goals
Kelantan	2017	Malaysia Super League	5	0	0	0	3	0	–	–	8	0
Kelantan	2018	Malaysia Super League	14	2	0	0	0	0	–	–	14	2
Kelantan	2019	Malaysia Premier League	14	4	0	0	0	0	–	–	14	4
Kelantan	Total		33	6	0	0	3	0	–	–	36	6

== Honours ==
=== Club ===
Kelantan U21

- Malaysia President Cup: 2016
