= Alaeddine Bouslimi =

Tunisian professional footballer

Alaa Bouslimi
Personal information
- Full name: Alaeddine Bouslimi
- Date of birth: 5 September 1990 (age 36)
- Place of birth: Tunisia
- Height: 1.87 m (6 ft 2 in)
- Position: Centre back

Senior career*
| Years | Team | Apps | (Gls) |
| 2009–2010 | Club Africain | 0 | (0) |
| 2010–2011 | EGS Gafsa | 17 | (0) |
| 2011–2012 | ES Zarzis | 21 | (1) |
| 2012–2013 | EGS Gafsa | 14 | (1) |
| 2013–2014 | Club Africain | 22 | (0) |
| 2014–2015 | EGS Gafsa | 27 | (0) |
| 2015–2016 | Club Africain | 12 | (0) |
| 2016 | Stade Tunisien | 12 | (0) |
| 2016–2017 | CS Hammam-Lif | 24 | (7) |
| 2018 | Kelantan | 3 | (0) |
| 2018–2019 | AS Gabès | 24 | (2) |
| 2019–2020 | Al-Ahli | | |
| 2020–2021 | ES Métlaoui | 26 | (2) |
| 2021–2022 | Jeddah | 37 | (3) |
| 2022–2024 | Al-Washm | | |
| 2024–2025 | Al-Watani | | |
- * Club domestic league appearances and goals as of 23:44, 19 December 2019 (UTC)

Alaeddine Bouslimi (Arabic: علاء البوسليمي; born 5 September 1990) is a Tunisian professional footballer who plays as a centre back.

== Club career ==
=== Kelantan ===
On 20 May 2018, Bouslimi signed a contract with Malaysia Super League side Kelantan.

=== Saudi Arabia ===
On 9 August 2021, Bouslimi joined Saudi club Jeddah.

On 18 August 2022, Bouslimi joined Saudi Second Division club Al-Washm.

On 13 October 2024, Bouslimi joined Saudi Third Division club Al-Watani.
