= Cristiano Sergipano =

Brazilian footballer

Personal information
- Full name: Cristiano Marcolino Santos
- Date of birth: 17 March 1988 (age 38)
- Place of birth: Laranjeiras, Brazil
- Height: 1.78 m (5 ft 10 in)
- Position: Forward

Youth career
- 2007: Confiança

Senior career*
Years	Team	Apps	(Gls)
2011	Ypiranga	8	(0)
2012	Guarany	2	(0)
2012	Araripina	8	(1)
2013	Serra Talhada	15	(0)
2014	Vitória das Tabocas	1	(0)
2014	CRAC	0	(0)
2015	Santa Cruz	13	(6)
2015	Globo	0	(0)
2015–2016	Al-Dhaid		
2016–2017	Masfout		
2017–2018	HUSA	20	(1)
2018	Kelantan	5	(0)
2019	Perilima	0	(0)
2019	Globo	7	(0)
2019	Rosário Central-SE	0	(0)
2020	Sergipe	0	(0)
2020	Angkor Tiger	8	(6)
2020–2021	Tiffy Army	9	(3)
- * Club domestic league appearances and goals as of 13:27, 20 June 2019 (UTC)

Cristiano Marcolino Santos (born 17 March 1989), knows as Cristiano Sergipano, is a Brazilian professional footballer who plays as a forward.
