= Fernando Márquez (footballer) =

Argentine footballer

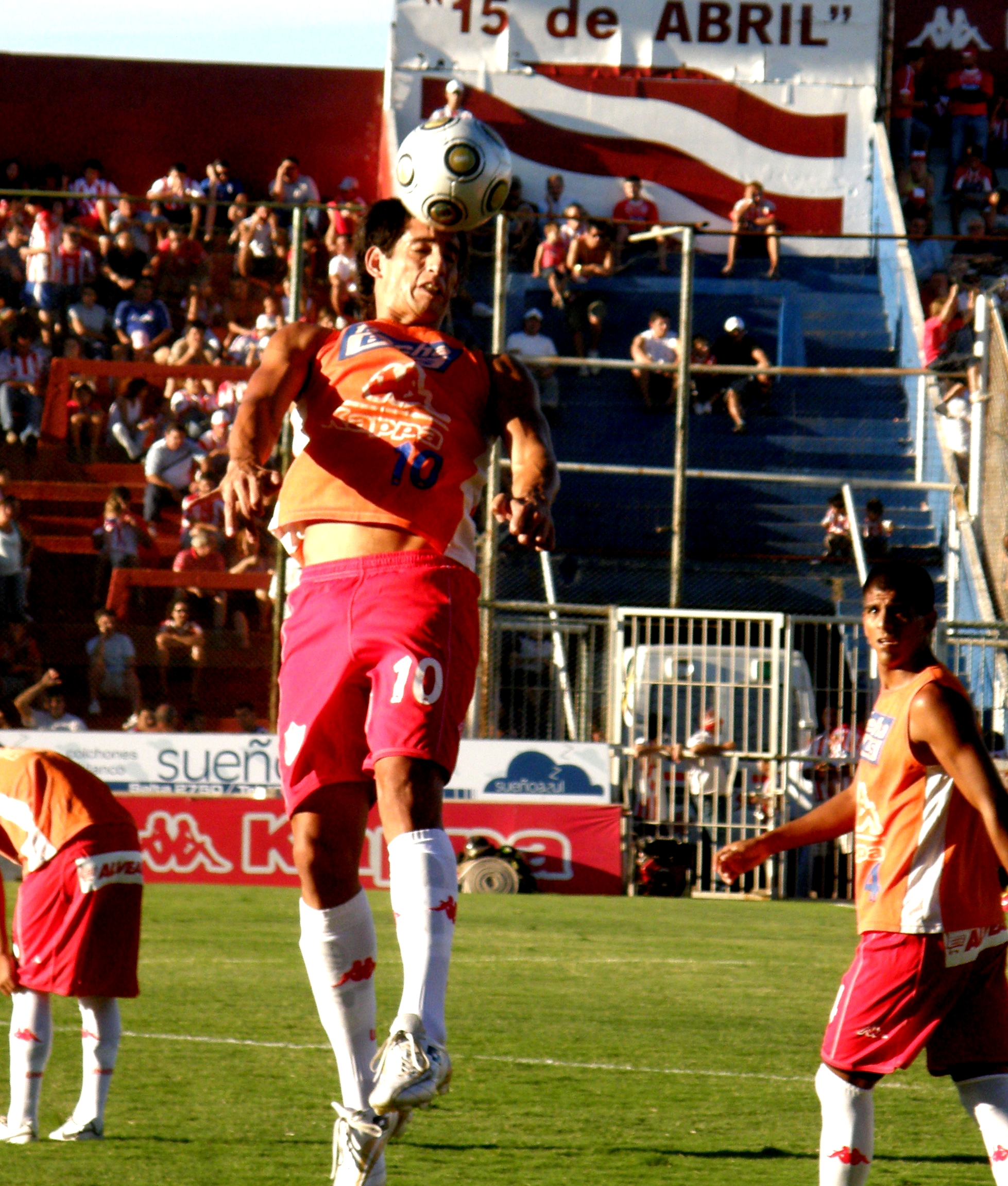
- Márquez in 2009

Personal information
- Full name: Fernando Andrés Márquez
- Date of birth: 10 December 1987 (age 38)
- Place of birth: Santa Fe, Argentina
- Height: 1.84 m (6 ft 0 in)
- Position: Forward

Team information
- Current team: Sportivo Belgrano

Senior career*
Years	Team	Apps	(Gls)
2006–2009	Unión Santa Fe	51	(9)
2010–2012	Crucero del Norte	89	(32)
2013–2018	Belgrano	126	(18)
2017	→ Defensa y Justicia (loan)	21	(10)
2018	Johor Darul Takzim	10	(7)
2019–2020	Defensa y Justicia	22	(6)
2020–2021	Unión de Santa Fe	35	(4)
2022	Ferro Carril Oeste	13	(0)
2022–2023	Atlético Grau	34	(9)
2024	Deportivo Maipú	7	(0)
2024–	Sportivo Belgrano	5	(0)
- * Club domestic league appearances and goals as of 10 March 2019

Fernando Andrés Márquez (born 10 December 1987), sometimes known as Cuqui Márquez, is an Argentine professional footballer who plays as a forward for Sportivo Belgrano.

During 2017, Márquez played for Defensa y Justicia on loan from Club Atlético Belgrano.

== Honours ==
=== Club ===
Johor Darul Ta'zim

- Malaysia Super League: 2018
