= Fernando Elizari =

Argentine footballer (born 1991)

Personal information
- Full name: Fernando Gastón Elizari
- Date of birth: 5 April 1991 (age 35)
- Place of birth: Buenos Aires, Argentina
- Height: 1.73 m (5 ft 8 in)
- Position: Midfielder

Team information
- Current team: América Mineiro
- Number: 5

Youth career
- 2010: Quilmes

Senior career*
Years	Team	Apps	(Gls)
2011	Independiente	0	(0)
2012–2013	Quilmes	27	(3)
2013–2017	San Lorenzo	19	(0)
2014–2015	→ O'Higgins (loan)	20	(1)
2016	→ Quilmes (loan)	8	(2)
2016–2017	→ Defensa y Justicia (loan)	17	(0)
2018	Defensa y Justicia	5	(1)
2018	→ Johor Darul Ta'zim (loan)	8	(2)
2019	Dorados	28	(1)
2020	Unión Santa Fe	7	(0)
2021	Cerro	21	(1)
2022–2024	Defensor Sporting	87	(8)
2024–	América Mineiro	76	(7)
- * Club domestic league appearances and goals as of 18 November 2026

Fernando Gastón Elizari (born 5 April 1991) is an Argentine footballer who plays for América Mineiro as a midfielder.

== Honours ==
San Lorenzo

- Argentine Primera División: 2013 Inicial
- Copa Libertadores: 2014

Johor Darul Takzim F.C.

- Malaysia Super League : 2018
