= Farisham Ismail =

Malaysian footballer

Personal information
- Full name: Mohd Farisham bin Ismail
- Date of birth: 5 January 1985 (age 41)
- Place of birth: Morak, Tumpat, Kelantan, Malaysia
- Height: 1.73 m (5 ft 8 in)
- Positions: Left back; centre-back

Youth career
- 2003–2004: Kelantan U21

Senior career*
Years	Team	Apps	(Gls)
2004–2005	Kelantan	53	(12)
2006–2007	Telekom Melaka	24	(5)
2008–2021	Kelantan	120	(0)
2016	→ Penang (loan)	8	(0)

International career^{‡}
2011–2013	Malaysia	3	(0)

Managerial career
- 2022–: Kelantan The Real Warriors (assistant)
- * Club domestic league appearances and goals ‡ National team caps and goals as of July 13, 2016

Mohd Farisham bin Ismail (born 5 January 1985) is a Malaysian former professional footballer. He primarily played as a left-back but also as a centre-back.

Born in Tumpat, Kelantan and began his youth career playing for Kelantan President's Cup team in 2003 to 2004. Due to the nature of his leadership, he was appointed as the captain of the team at that time.

== Club career ==
Farisham made his debut with the Kelantan senior team in 2004 before joining the Malacca based club, Telekom Melaka for 2006–07 season. After one season in Malacca he returned to Kelantan and became part of the first eleven in every match. Farisham and several other defenders formed a persistent defense and were tough to beat. Although selected to represent the national team he was often only on the bench and it was difficult for him to be part of the main eleven.

In December 2006, Farisham signed with the Malacca based club, Telekom Malaysia for 2006–07 season and help the team finish at 7th in the league.

On 11 July 2016, Farisham joined Penang on a loan deal until the end of 2016 season. The request was made by Penang FA Chief Executive Officer Bojan Hodak, who is a former head coach of the Kelantan. Farisham made his debut on 16 July 2016 in the league match against T–Team as a 76th-minute substitute for defender Rafiuddin Rodin. Penang won that match 3–4. He made 8 appearances with Penang during that season.

== International career ==
Farisham has been called by Football Association of Malaysia to play in the Malaysia national team because he played well during the 2010 Malaysia Cup finals to undergo the national team training center starting 3 August 2011. In September 2013, he was unable to join the Malaysia national team in a friendly match with China due to injury. Farisham made his debut for Malaysia national team in 2–0 friendly win against Myanmar on 18 June 2011.

== Career statistics ==
=== Club ===
As of match played 21 July 2019

Appearances and goals by club, season and competition
Club	Season	League			Cup		League Cup		Continental		Total	
Club	Season	Division	Apps	Goals	Apps	Goals	Apps	Goals	Apps	Goals	Apps	Goals
Telekom Melaka	2006–07	Malaysia Super League	0	0	0	0	0	0	—		-	-
Telekom Melaka	Total		0	0	0	0	0	0	—		-	-
Kelantan	2007–08	Malaysia Premier League							—			
Kelantan	2009	Malaysia Super League					1*		—			
Kelantan	2010	Malaysia Super League	9	0			1	1	—		10	1
Kelantan	2011	Malaysia Super League	25	0	0	0	0	0	—		25	0
Kelantan	2012	Malaysia Super League	9	0	0	0	0	0	6	0	15	0
Kelantan	2013	Malaysia Super League	9	0	1	0	0	0	4	0	14	0
Kelantan	2014	Malaysia Super League	3	0	0	0	5	0	5	0	13	0
Kelantan	2015	Malaysia Super League	15	0	4	0	2	0	—		21	0
Kelantan	2016	Malaysia Super League	4	0	1	0	0	0	—		5	0
Kelantan	2017	Malaysia Super League	16	0	1	0	3	0	—		20	0
Kelantan	2018	Malaysia Super League	9	0	2	0	0	0	—		11	0
Kelantan	2019	Malaysia Premier League	19	0	1	0	4	0	—		20	0
Kelantan	2020	Malaysia Premier League	2	0	0	0	0	0	—		2	0
Kelantan	Total		120	0	9	0	16	1	15	0	160	1
Penang (loan)	2016	Malaysia Super League	8	0	0	0	0	0	—		8	0
Penang (loan)	Total		8	0	0	0	0	0	—		8	0
Career total			128	0	9	0	11	1	15	0	168	1

=== International ===
Malaysia national team
Year	Apps	Goals
2011	2	0
2013	1	0
Total	3	0

== Honours ==
=== Club ===
Kelantan U21

- Malaysia President Cup: Runners-up 2003

Kelantan

- Malaysia Super League: 2011, 2012; Runners-up 2010
- Malaysia Cup: 2010, 2012; Runners-up 2009, 2013
- Malaysia FA Cup: 2012, 2013; Runners-up 2015, 2011, 2009
- Malaysia Charity Shield: 2011; Runners-up 2012
