= 2018 Melaka United season =

Melaka United
2018 season
- President: Adly Zahari
- Manager: Yusoff Mahadi
- Head coach: Eduardo Almeida (until 3 May); E. Elavarasan (from 7 May)
- Stadium: Hang Jebat Stadium (capacity:40,000)
- Malaysia Super League: 7th
- Malaysia FA Cup: Third round
- Malaysia Cup: Group stage
- Top goalscorer: League: Yahor Zubovich (12); All: Yahor Zubovich (19)
| Home colours | Away colours | Third colours |

The 2018 season was Melaka United Soccer Association's 95th season in club history and 2nd season in the Malaysia Super League.

== Kit ==
- Supplier: Warrix Sports
- Main sponsors: Edra & CGN
- Other sponsors: Restoran Melayu, Hatten Groups

| Home | Away | Alternate | Goalkeeper | Goalkeeper |

== Players ==
=== First-team squad ===
| No. | Name | Nat. | Position(s) | Since | Date of birth (Age) | Signed from | Notes |
Goalkeeper
| 1 | Fazli Paat | (Malaysia) | GK | 2017 | 27 November 1989 (aged 27) | (Malaysia) Johor Darul Ta'zim II | |
| 11 | Zamir Selamat | (Malaysia) | GK | 2018 | 9 June 1989 (aged 28) | (Malaysia) PKNS | |
| 20 | Khairul Fahmi | (Malaysia) | GK | 2018 | 7 January 1989 (aged 28) | (Malaysia) Kelantan | Captain |
Defenders
| 3 | Faizal Muhammad | (Malaysia) | CB | 2017 | 3 March 1989 (aged 28) | (Malaysia) PDRM | |
| 4 | Shazlan Alias | (Malaysia) | RB | 2018 | 27 December 1989 (aged 27) | (Malaysia) Negeri Sembilan | |
| 5 | Nicholas Swirad | (Malaysia) (England) | CB | 2017 | 28 May 1991 (aged 26) | (Malaysia) Johor Darul Ta'zim II | |
| 8 | Faris Shah Rosli | (Malaysia) | CB | 2018 | 17 April 1995 (aged 22) | (Malaysia) Kelantan | |
| 15 | Steven Thicot | (France) | CB | 2018 | 14 February 1987 (aged 30) | (Greece) AEL | 3rd-captain |
| 18 | Syawal Norsam | (Malaysia) | CB | 2016 | 29 May 1989 (aged 27) | (Malaysia) Pahang | |
| 21 | Azmi Muslim | (Malaysia) | LB | 2018 | 17 October 1986 (aged 31) | (Malaysia) PKNS | |
| 26 | Khair Jones | (Malaysia) (New Zealand) | LB | 2016 | 29 September 1989 (aged 28) | (New Zealand) Hawke's Bay United | Vice-captain |
| 27 | Puaneswaran Gunasekaran | (Malaysia) | RB | 2016 | 27 May 1983 (aged 34) | (Malaysia) Negeri Sembilan | |
Midfielders
| 6 | Sivanesan Shanmugam | (Malaysia) | CM | 2017 | 28 December 1990 (aged 26) | (Malaysia) PKNS | |
| 7 | Surendran Ravindran | (Malaysia) | RM | 2016 | 17 May 1987 (aged 30) | (Malaysia) Pahang | |
| 16 | Shahdan Sulaiman | (Singapore) | CM | 2018 | 9 May 1988 (aged 29) | (Singapore) Tampines Rovers | Loan |
| 23 | Chanturu Suppiah | (Malaysia) | RW | 2018 | 14 December 1987 (aged 29) | (Malaysia) Johor Darul Ta'zim | |
| 24 | Gopinathan Ramachandra | (Malaysia) | LW | 2018 | 15 December 1989 (aged 27) | (Malaysia) Johor Darul Ta'zim | |
| 30 | Veenod Subramaniam | (Malaysia) | DM | 2018 | 31 March 1988 (aged 30) | (Malaysia) Kelantan | |
| 35 | Nizarruddin Jazi | (Malaysia) | CM | 2018 | 12 February 2000 (aged 17) | Youth | |
Forwards
| 2 | Akmal Ishak | (Malaysia) | CF | 2017 | 19 July 1994 (aged 23) | (Malaysia) Johor Darul Ta'zim II | |
| 9 | Nurshamil Abd Ghani | (Malaysia) | CF / RW | 2015 | 25 September 1994 (aged 23) | (Malaysia) Harimau Muda B | |
| 10 | Ifedayo Olusegun | (Nigeria) | CF | 2018 | 14 January 1991 (aged 26) | (Bahrain) Al-Hidd | |
| 13 | Fakri Saarani | (Malaysia) | CF | 2018 | 8 July 1989 (aged 28) | (Malaysia) Kedah | |
| 17 | Yahor Zubovich | (Belarus) | CF | 2018 | 1 June 1989 (aged 28) | (Belarus) Torpedo-BelAZ | |
| 19 | Fauzi Roslan | (Malaysia) | CF | 2017 | 27 August 1988 (aged 29) | (Malaysia) Pahang | |
| 25 | Farderin Kadir | (Malaysia) | CF | 2018 | 30 January 1987 (aged 30) | (Malaysia) PKNS | |
| 29 | Lee Chang-hoon | (South Korea) | CF | 2018 | 17 December 1986 (aged 31) | (South Korea) Seongnam | |

== Transfers ==
=== In ===
1st leg

| Date | Pos | No | Player | From | Type | Window | Fee | Ref |
|---|---|---|---|---|---|---|---|---|
| 14 November 2017 | GK | | (Malaysia) Zamir Selamat | (Malaysia) PKNS | Transfer | Pre-season | Free | |
| 14 November 2017 | GK | | (Malaysia) Faridzuean Kamaruddin | (Malaysia) Sime Darby | Transfer | Pre-season | Free | |
| 16 November 2017 | DF | | (Malaysia) Azmi Muslim | (Malaysia) PKNS | Transfer | Pre-season | Free | |
| 21 November 2017 | MF | | (Malaysia) Chanturu Suppiah | (Malaysia) Johor Darul Ta'zim | Loan | Pre-season | — | |
| 21 November 2017 | MF | | (Malaysia) Gopinathan Ramachandra | (Malaysia) Johor Darul Ta'zim | Loan | Pre-season | — | |
| 24 November 2017 | FW | | (Malaysia) Fakri Saarani | (Malaysia) Kedah | Transfer | Pre-season | Free | |
| 1 December 2017 | FW | | (Malaysia) Nurshamil Abd Ghani | (Malaysia) Selangor | Loan return | Pre-season | — | |
| 1 December 2017 | FW | | (Malaysia) Farderin Kadir | (Malaysia) PKNS | Transfer | Pre-season | — | |
| 1 December 2017 | FW | | (Malaysia) Akmal Ishak | (Malaysia) PJ Rangers | Loan return | Pre-season | — | |
| 1 December 2017 | DF | | (Malaysia) Nicholas Swirad | (Malaysia) Johor Darul Ta'zim II | Transfer | Pre-season | Free | |
| 1 December 2017 | DF | | (Malaysia) Shazlan Alias | (Malaysia) Negeri Sembilan | Transfer | Pre-season | Free | |
| 8 December 2017 | DF | | (France) Steven Thicot | (Greece) AEL | Transfer | Pre-season | Free | |
| 8 December 2017 | MF | | (Portugal) Tiago Gomes | (Cyprus) Doxa | Transfer | Pre-season | Free | |
| 26 December 2017 | MF | | (Singapore) Shahdan Sulaiman | (Singapore) Tampines Rovers | Loan | Pre-season | — | |

2nd leg

| Date | Pos | No | Player | From | Type | Window | Fee | Ref |
|---|---|---|---|---|---|---|---|---|
| 7 May 2018 | GK | | (Malaysia) Khairul Fahmi | (Malaysia) Kelantan | Transfer | Mid-season | Undisclosed | |
| May 2018 | MF | | (Malaysia) Syahrul Azwari | (Malaysia) Johor Darul Ta'zim | Transfer | Mid-season | On loan | |
| May 2018 | MF | | (Malaysia) Veenod Subramaniam | (Malaysia) Kelantan | Transfer | Mid-season | Undisclosed | |
| May 2018 | FW | | (South Korea) Lee Chang-hoon | (South Korea) Sangju Sangmu | Transfer | Mid-season | Undisclosed | |
| May 2018 | DF | | (Malaysia) Faris Shah Rosli | (Malaysia) Kelantan | Transfer | Mid-season | Undisclosed | |
| May 2018 | FW | | (Nigeria) Ifedayo Olusegun | (Bahrain) Hidd SCC | Transfer | Mid-season | Undisclosed | |

=== Out ===
1st leg

| Date | Pos | No | Player | To | Type | Window | Fee | Ref |
|---|---|---|---|---|---|---|---|---|
| 11 November 2017 | FW | 9 | (Croatia) Marko Šimić | (Indonesia) Persija Jakarta | Transfer | Pre-season | Free | |
| 11 November 2017 | MF | 10 | (Brazil) Felipe Almeida De Souza | | Released | Pre-season | Free | |
| 1 December 2017 | DF | 11 | (Malaysia) Fandi Othman | (Malaysia) Johor Darul Ta'zim II | Loan return | Pre-season | — | |
| 1 December 2017 | MF | 17 | (Malaysia) Azinee Taib | (Malaysia) Johor Darul Ta'zim II | Loan return | Pre-season | — | |
| 1 December 2017 | DF | | (Malaysia) Nicholas Swirad | (Malaysia) Johor Darul Ta'zim II | Loan return | Pre-season | — | |
| December 2017 | MF | 23 | (Malaysia) Jasmir Mehat | (Malaysia) Terengganu City | Transfer | Pre-season | Free | |
| December 2017 | FW | 14 | (Malaysia) Izzaq Faris Ramlan | (Malaysia) Terengganu City | Transfer | Pre-season | Free | |
| December 2017 | DF | 15 | (Malaysia) Akmal Zahir | | Released | Pre-season | Free | |
| December 2017 | DF | 16 | (Malaysia) Isma Alif | (Malaysia) Marcerra United | Released | Pre-season | Free | |
| December 2017 | MF | 8 | (Malaysia) Ezrie Shafizie | (Malaysia) MOF | Released | Pre-season | Free | |
| December 2017 | MF | 13 | (Malaysia) Norhakim Isa | (Malaysia) PKNP | Transfer | Pre-season | Free | |
| December 2017 | DF | 28 | (Malaysia) Nazri Ahmad | | Released | Pre-season | Free | |
| December 2017 | DF | 12 | (Malaysia) Khuzaimi Piee | (Malaysia) PKNP | Transfer | Pre-season | Free | |
| 5 January 2018 | DF | 25 | (North Macedonia) Jasmin Mecinović | (Lebanon) Nejmeh | Transfer | Pre-season | Free | |

2nd leg

| Date | Pos | No | Player | To | Type | Window | Fee | Ref |
|---|---|---|---|---|---|---|---|---|
| May 2018 | MF | | (Portugal) Tiago Gomes | | Transfer | Mid-season | Undisclosed | |
| May 2018 | GK | | (Malaysia) Faridzuean Kamaruddin | (Malaysia) Kelantan | Transfer | Mid-season | Undisclosed | |

== Friendlies ==
=== Pre-season ===
| 10 December 2017 Friendly | Melaka United (Malaysia) | 1–2 | (Malaysia) Negeri Sembilan | Krubong |
| | Nurshamil Abd Ghani | | Ivan Fatić; Andrezinho | Stadium: Hang Jebat Stadium |

| 14 December 2017 Friendly | Melaka United (Malaysia) | 0–0 | Malaysia U23 | Shah Alam |
| | | | | Stadium: Shah Alam Stadium |

| 21 December 2017 Friendly | Melaka United (Malaysia) | 6–0 | (Malaysia) UKM | Krubong |
| | Hafiz Sujad 13'; Mohd Fauzi Roslan 16'; Faris Ramli 59', 83'; Fakri Saarani 87'; Nurshamil Abd Ghani 90' | | | Stadium: Hang Jebat Stadium |

Vietnam Pre-season Tour 2018

| 6 January 2018 1 | Becamex Bình Dương (Vietnam) | 1–1 | (Malaysia) Melaka United | Thủ Dầu Một |
| | | | | Stadium: Gò Đậu Stadium |

| 9 January 2018 2 | Long An (Vietnam) | 2–1 | (Malaysia) Melaka United | Tân An |
| | | | Yahor Zubovich 80' | Stadium: Long An Stadium |

MB Terengganu Cup

| 16 January 2018 1 | Melaka United (Malaysia) | 4–1 | (Malaysia) Pahang | Kuala Terengganu |
| | Gopinathan Ramachandra 21'; Surendran Ravindran 49'; Mohd Fauzi Roslan 69'; Nurshamil Abd Ghani 72' | | Chan Vathanaka 85' | Stadium: Sultan Mizan Zainal Abidin Stadium |

| 17 January 2018 2 | Terengganu (Malaysia) | 5–0 | (Malaysia) Melaka United | Kuala Terengganu |
| | | | | Stadium: Sultan Ismail Nasiruddin Shah Stadium |

| 19 January 2018 3 | Terengganu II (Malaysia) | 4–3 | (Malaysia) Melaka United | Kuala Terengganu |
| | Aliff Fitri 4'; Akanni Sunday 12'; Sebastien Thuriere 38'; Ridzuan 68' | | Thiago Filipe 46'; R.Surendran 58'; Igor Zubovich 65' | Stadium: Sultan Mizan Zainal Abidin Stadium |

=== In-season ===
| 22 March 2018 Friendly | Melaka United (Malaysia) | 4—4 | (Singapore) Hougang United |

== Competitions ==
=== Overall ===
| Competition | Started round | Current position / round | Final position / round | First match | Last match |
|---|---|---|---|---|---|
| Super League | Matchday 1 | 7th | 7th | 3 February 2018 | 28 July 2018 |
| FA Cup | Second round | — | Third round | 4 March 2018 | 17 March 2018 |
| Malaysia Cup | Group stage | Group stage | Group stage | 5 August 2018 | 15 September 2018 |

Updated to match played 15 September 2018
Source: Competitions

=== Overview ===
| Competition | Record | | | | | | | |
| Competition | Pld | W | D | L | GF | GA | GD | Win % |
|---|---|---|---|---|---|---|---|---|
| Super League | 22 | 9 | 4 | 9 | 33 | 38 | −5 | 40.91 |
| FA Cup | 2 | 1 | 0 | 1 | 8 | 1 | +7 | 50.00 |
| Malaysia Cup | 6 | 2 | 3 | 1 | 18 | 9 | +9 | 33.33 |
| Total | 30 | 12 | 7 | 11 | 59 | 48 | +11 | 40.00 |

Last updated: 15 September 2018
Source: Competitions

=== Malaysia Super League ===
==== Table ====
| Pos | Team | Pld | W | D | L | GF | GA | GD | Pts |
|---|---|---|---|---|---|---|---|---|---|
| 5 | Terengganu | 22 | 10 | 4 | 8 | 32 | 31 | +1 | 34 |
| 6 | Kedah | 22 | 9 | 5 | 8 | 37 | 36 | +1 | 32 |
| 7 | Melaka United | 22 | 9 | 4 | 9 | 33 | 38 | −5 | 31 |
| 8 | Selangor | 22 | 7 | 6 | 9 | 35 | 39 | −4 | 27 |
| 9 | PKNP | 22 | 7 | 4 | 11 | 25 | 31 | −6 | 25 |

Source: FAM, FMLLP
Rules for classification: 1) Points; 2) Goal difference; 3) Number of goals scored.

==== Results by matchday ====
| Round | 1 | 2 | 3 | 4 | 5 | 6 | 7 | 8 | 9 | 10 | 11 | 12 | 13 | 14 | 15 | 16 | 17 | 18 | 19 | 20 | 21 | 22 |
|---|---|---|---|---|---|---|---|---|---|---|---|---|---|---|---|---|---|---|---|---|---|---|
| Ground | H | A | H | A | H | H | A | H | A | A | H | A | A | H | H | A | H | H | A | H | H | A |
| Result | W | L | W | L | W | L | L | L | L | D | D | L | W | W | L | W | L | W | D | D | W | W |
| Position | 3 | 6 | 4 | 7 | 4 | 7 | 7 | 9 | 10 | 10 | 10 | 10 | 10 | 10 | 10 | 7 | 9 | 7 | 7 | 7 | 7 | 7 |

Updated to match(es) played on 28 July 2018. Source: Matches
A = Away; H = Home; W = Win; D = Draw; L = Loss

==== Matches ====
Win Draw Loss

The fixtures for the 2018 Malaysia Super League season were announced on 11 January 2018.

| 3 February 2018 1 | Melaka United | 2–1 | Kelantan | Paya Rumput |
| 21:00 UTC+8 | Zubovich 12'; Jeon 31' (pen.), (yellow card) 90+6' | Report | Bruno Lopes 2'; Ferdinand (yellow card) 90+6' | Stadium: Hang Jebat Stadium; Referee: Zulkarnain Zakaria |

| 7 February 2018 2 | Selangor | 4–1 | Melaka United | Cheras |
| 21:00 UTC+8 | Rufino 8', 67'; Amri (yellow card) 32'; Kugan (yellow card) 45+2'; Syahmi 54', 90' | Report | Gomes 30' | Stadium: KLFA Stadium |

| 11 February 2018 3 | Melaka United | 3–0 | Negeri Sembilan | Paya Rumput |
| 21:00 UTC+8 | Zubovich 32', 40'; Gopinathan 71' | Report | Aizulridzwan (yellow card) 78' | Stadium: Hang Jebat Stadium |

| 24 February 2018 4 | Johor Darul Ta'zim | 3–0 | Melaka United | Larkin |
| 21:00 UTC+8 | Fadhli (yellow card) 4'; Figueroa 13'; Safiq (yellow card) 20'; Díaz 21'; Insa 35' | Report | Surendran (yellow card) 24'; Fakri (yellow card) 30'; Thicot (yellow card) 48' | Stadium: Tan Sri Dato' Haji Hassan Yunos Stadium; Referee: Suhaimi Mat Hassan |

| 11 March 2018 5 | Melaka United | 2–0 | PKNP | Paya Rumput |
| 21:00 UTC+8 | Zubovich 14', 86'; Fakri (yellow card) 57' | Report | Hafiz (yellow card) 10'; Ridzuan (yellow card) 30' | Stadium: Hang Jebat Stadium; Referee: Mohd Amirul Izwan Yaacob |

| 13 April 2018 6 | Melaka United | 0–3 | Terengganu | Cheras |
| 21:00 UTC+8 | | Report | Tchétché 27', 76'; Fitri (yellow card) 38'; Nasrullah (yellow card) 42'; Lee Tuck 81'; Thierry Bin (yellow card) 86' | Stadium: KLFA Stadium; Referee: Suresh Jayaraman |

| 28 April 2018 7 | Pahang | 2–0 | Melaka United | Kuantan |
| 21:00 MYT | Safuwan (yellow card) 39'; Azam (yellow card) 54'; Cruz 75'; Faisal 90+3', (yellow card) 90+4' | Report | Gopinathan (yellow card) 74' | Stadium: Darul Makmur Stadium; Referee: Mohd Nafeez Abdul Wahab |

| 2 May 2018 8 | Melaka United | 1–2 | Perak | Krubong |
| 21:00 UTC+8 | Faizal (yellow card) 45+2'; Chanturu (yellow card) 64'; Zubovich 79' | Report | Wander Luiz 45+4' (pen.); Gilmar 56'; Khairil (yellow card) 82'; Hakim (yellow card) 90+1' | Stadium: Hang Jebat Stadium; Referee: Khairul Azuan Kidam |

| 5 May 2018 9 | PKNS | 2–0 | Melaka United | Shah Alam |
| 21:00 UTC+8 | Ramazotti 69', (yellow card) 71'; Safee 80' | Report | | Stadium: Shah Alam Stadium; Referee: Zulkarnain Zakaria |

| 12 May 2018 10 | Perak | 0–0 | Melaka United | Ipoh |
| 21:00 UTC+8 | Leandro (yellow card) 50'; Azhan (yellow card) 78' | Report | Khair (yellow card) 45+1'; Zubovich (yellow card) 45+3'; Fahmi (yellow card) 81' | Stadium: Perak Stadium; Referee: Wan Mohamad Tarmizi |

| 23 May 2018 11 | Melaka United | 1–1 | PKNS | Krubong |
| 22:00 UTC+8 | Jeon 16'; Fakri (yellow card) 51' | Report | Jafri 43'; Daniel (yellow card) 45' (yellow-red card) 86' | Stadium: Hang Jebat Stadium; Referee: Mohd Nafeez Abdul Wahab |

| 26 May 2018 12 | Terengganu | 1–0 | Melaka United | Kuala Terengganu |
| 22:00 UTC+8 | Kamal Azizi (yellow card) 2'; Ashari 61'; Latiff (yellow card) 83' | Report | | Stadium: Sultan Ismail Nasiruddin Shah Stadium; Referee: Nagor Amir Noor Mohamed |

| 1 June 2018 13 | Kedah | 0–2 | Melaka United | Alor Setar |
| 22:00 UTC+8 | | Report | Zubovich 43'; Jeon (yellow card) 87'; Lee 90+1' | Stadium: Darul Aman Stadium; Referee: Zulkarnain Zakaria |

| 5 June 2018 14 | Kuala Lumpur | 3–4 | Melaka United | Kuala Lumpur |
| 22:00 UTC+8 | Paulo Josué 43'; De Paula 48', 71' (pen.); Firdaus (yellow card) 62' | Report | Zubovich 6'; Syahrul Azwari 23'; Ifedayo 34', 76', (yellow card) 45+1'; Veenod (yellow card) 75' | Stadium: KLFA Stadium; Referee: Khairul Azuan Kidam |

| 9 June 2018 15 | Melaka United | 2–4 | Kuala Lumpur | Krubong |
| 22:00 UTC+8 | Ifedayo 5', 42'; Zamir (yellow card) 61' | Report | Indra Putra 30', 84'; Zhafri (yellow card) 35' (yellow-red card) 69'; Zaquan 56'; Akbarov (yellow card) 49'; De Paula 64' (pen.); Irfan (yellow card) 90+1' | Stadium: Hang Jebat Stadium; Referee: Razlan Jeffri Ali |

| 19 June 2018 16 | PKNP | 1–2 | Melaka United | Ipoh |
| 21:00 UTC+8 | Hafiz Ramdan (yellow card) 34'; Shahrel Fikri 57' | Report | Lee Chang-Hoon 65'; Ifedayo 90+1' | Stadium: Perak Stadium; Referee: Nagor Amir Noor Mohamed |

| 26 June 2018 17 | Melaka United | 0–4 | Johor Darul Ta'zim | Krubong |
| 21:00 UTC+8 | | Report | Fernando Márquez 41'; Fernando Elizari 54'; Safawi 65'; Fadhli (yellow card) 85'; Nazmi 90+1' | Stadium: Hang Jebat Stadium; Referee: Muhammad Nazmi Nasaruddin |

| 10 July 2018 18 | Melaka United | 4–1 | Kedah | Krubong |
| 21:00 UTC+8 | Khair 34'; Gopinathan 38', 62'; Ifedayo 85' | Report | Paulo Rangel 52' (pen.); Halim (yellow card) 56'; Syawal (yellow card) 59' | Stadium: Hang Jebat Stadium; Referee: Mohd Nafeez Abdul Wahab |

| 14 July 2018 19 | Kelantan | 1–1 | Melaka United | Kota Bharu |
| 21:00 UTC+8 | Shafiq 11' | Report | Faris Shah (yellow card) 45+2'; Zubovich 90+3' (pen.) | Stadium: Sultan Muhammad IV Stadium; Referee: Suresh Jayaraman |

| 18 July 2018 20 | Melaka United | 2–2 | Pahang | Krubong |
| 21:00 UTC+8 | Gopinathan 15'; Zubovich 25'; Shazlan (yellow card) 35'; Nurshamil (yellow card) 89' | Report | Nakajima-Farran 8'; Amutu 45+2'; Wan Zaharulnizam (yellow card) 53' | Stadium: Hang Jebat Stadium; Referee: Zulkarnain Zakaria |

| 21 July 2018 21 | Melaka United | 3–2 | Selangor | Krubong |
| 21:00 UTC+8 | Zubovich 50', 84'; Gopinathan (yellow card) 74'; Swirad 90+4' | Report | Ilham Udin 26'; Ashmawi (yellow card) 35'; Kugan 70'; Alfonso (yellow card) 75' | Stadium: Hang Jebat Stadium; Referee: Nagor Amir Noor Mohamed |

| 28 July 2018 22 | Negeri Sembilan | 1–3 | Melaka United | Paroi |
| 21:00 UTC+8 | Fauzan (yellow card) 53'; Guirado (yellow card) 79'; Júnior 90+3' | Report | Ifedayo 49', 66'; Nasriq 64' (o.g.) | Stadium: Tuanku Abdul Rahman Stadium; Referee: Suresh Jayaraman |

=== Malaysia FA Cup ===
| 4 March 2018 Second round | Melaka United | 7–0 | Southern | Paya Rumput |
| 21:00 UTC+8 | Zubovich 13' (pen.), 26'; Gopinathan 24'; Fauzi 35'; Farderin 45', 51'; Nurshamil 76' | Report | | Stadium: Hang Jebat Stadium; Referee: Zulkifli Ahmad |

| 17 March 2018 Third round | Melaka United | 1–1 (a.e.t.) (1–3 p) | Kuala Lumpur | Paya Rumput |
| 21:00 UTC+8 | Zubovich 4'; Tiago Gomes (yellow card) 60' | Report | Paulo Josué (yellow card) 27' de Paula 31'; Akbarov (yellow card) 49' (yellow-red card) 64'; Zaiful (yellow card) 105+1' | Stadium: Hang Jebat Stadium; Referee: Suhaimi Mat Hassan |
| | Penalties |
| | Khair (penalty missed); Thicot (penalty scored); Puaneswaran (penalty missed); Tiago Gomes (penalty missed) | | de Paula (penalty scored); Indra Putra (penalty scored); Zaiful (penalty missed); Paulo Josué (penalty scored) |

=== Malaysia Cup ===
==== Group stage ====
| Pos | Team | Pld | W | D | L | GF | GA | GD | Pts | Qualification | PKNS | FEL | MEL | PDRM |
|---|---|---|---|---|---|---|---|---|---|---|---|---|---|---|
| 1 | PKNS | 6 | 4 | 1 | 1 | 18 | 9 | +9 | 13 | Advance to knockout stage | — | 2–3 | 2–1 | 5–0 |
| 2 | FELDA United | 6 | 3 | 1 | 2 | 11 | 9 | +2 | 10 | Advance to knockout stage | 0–1 | — | 0–0 | 2–0 |
| 3 | Melaka United | 6 | 2 | 3 | 1 | 18 | 9 | +9 | 9 | | 3–3 | 6–1 | — | 2–2 |
| 4 | PDRM | 6 | 0 | 1 | 5 | 5 | 25 | −20 | 1 | | 2–5 | 0–5 | 1–6 | — |

Updated to match(es) played on 15 September 2018. Source: FAM FMLLP

| 5 August 2018 1 | Felda United | 0–0 | Melaka United | Jengka |
| 21:00 UTC+8 | | Report | | Stadium: Tun Abdul Razak Stadium; Referee: Wan Amirul |

| 11 August 2018 2 | Melaka United | 3–3 | PKNS | Krubong |
| 21:00 UTC+8 | Lee 8', 79'; Faris (yellow card) 38'; Ifedayo 79' | Report | Safee (yellow card) 74'; Morales 87'; Matos 90+1'; Ramazotti 90+3' | Stadium: Hang Jebat Stadium; Referee: Zulkifli Ahmad |

| 17 August 2018 3 | Melaka United | 2–2 | PDRM | Krubong |
| 21:00 UTC+8 | Ifedayo 86'; Zubovich 90+4' | Report | Sim 49' (pen.); Hazwan Fakhrullah (yellow card) 74'; Shahurain 79' | Stadium: Hang Jebat Stadium; Referee: Wan Mohamad Tarmizi |

| 26 August 2018 4 | PDRM | 1–6 | Melaka United | Krubong |
| 21:00 UTC+8 | Nabil Lapti 86' | Report | Ifedayo 12' (pen.); Azwari 14', 45'; Shahdan 53'; Zubovich 57', 70' | Stadium: Hang Jebat Stadium; Referee: Muhammad Nazmi Nasaruddin |

| 1 September 2018 5 | PKNS | 2–1 | Melaka United | Shah Alam |
| 21:00 UTC+8 | Morales 24'; Ramazotti 66' | Report | Syahrul Azwari 56' | Stadium: Shah Alam Stadium; Referee: Mohd Amirul Izwan Yaacob |

| 15 September 2018 6 | Melaka United | 6–1 | Felda United | Krubong |
| 21:00 UTC+8 | Ifedayo 7', 43', 83'; Zubovich 24'; Thicot (yellow card) 52'; Chanturu 73', 78'; Faris (yellow card) 75' | Report | Zahril 55' | Stadium: Hang Jebat Stadium; Referee: Mohd Nafeez Abdul Wahab |

== Statistics ==
=== Appearances and goals ===
| No. | Pos | Nat | Player | Total | | Super League | | FA Cup | | Malaysia Cup | |
| No. | Pos | Nat | Player | Apps | Goals | Apps | Goals | Apps | Goals | Apps | Goals |
Goalkeepers
| 1 | GK | (Malaysia) MAS | Fazli Paat | 1 | -4 | 1 | -4 | 0 | 0 | 0 | 0 |
| 11 | GK | (Malaysia) MAS | Zamir Selamat | 11 | -8 | 9 | -8 | 1 | 0 | 0+1 | 0 |
| 20 | GK | (Malaysia) MAS | Khairul Fahmi | 17 | 13 | 11 | +9 | 0 | 0 | 6 | +4 |
Defenders
| 3 | DF | (Malaysia) MAS | Faizal Muhammad | 2 | 0 | 1 | 0 | 1 | 0 | 0 | 0 |
| 4 | DF | (Malaysia) MAS | Shazlan Alias | 3 | 0 | 2 | 0 | 1 | 0 | 0 | 0 |
| 5 | DF | (Malaysia) MAS | Nicholas Swirad | 26 | 1 | 19 | 1 | 1 | 0 | 6 | 0 |
| 8 | DF | (Malaysia) MAS | Faris Shah Rosli | 15 | 0 | 9 | 0 | 0 | 0 | 6 | 0 |
| 15 | DF | (France) FRA | Steven Thicot | 27 | 0 | 19 | 0 | 2 | 0 | 6 | 0 |
| 18 | DF | (Malaysia) MAS | Syawal Norsam | 2 | 0 | 1+1 | 0 | 0 | 0 | 0 | 0 |
| 21 | DF | (Malaysia) MAS | Azmi Muslim | 21 | 0 | 13+1 | 0 | 1 | 0 | 5+1 | 0 |
| 26 | DF | (Malaysia) MAS | Khair Jones | 19 | 1 | 16+1 | 1 | 1 | 0 | 1 | 0 |
| 27 | DF | (Malaysia) MAS | Puaneswaran Gunasekaran | 13 | 0 | 10+1 | 0 | 1 | 0 | 0+1 | 0 |
Midfielders
| 6 | MF | (Malaysia) MAS | Sivanesan Shanmugam | 13 | 0 | 4+6 | 0 | 2 | 0 | 1 | 0 |
| 7 | MF | (Malaysia) MAS | Surendran Ravindran | 17 | 0 | 9+3 | 0 | 1 | 0 | 0+4 | 0 |
| 12 | MF | (Malaysia) MAS | Syahrul Azwari | 13 | 4 | 7+1 | 1 | 0 | 0 | 5 | 3 |
| 16 | MF | (Singapore) SGP | Shahdan Sulaiman | 24 | 1 | 19+1 | 0 | 0 | 0 | 4 | 1 |
| 23 | MF | (Malaysia) MAS | Chanturu Suppiah | 23 | 2 | 6+9 | 0 | 0+3 | 0 | 1+4 | 2 |
| 24 | MF | (Malaysia) MAS | Gopinathan Ramachandra | 25 | 5 | 15+2 | 4 | 2 | 1 | 6 | 0 |
| 30 | MF | (Malaysia) MAS | Veenod Subramaniam | 16 | 0 | 8+2 | 0 | 0 | 0 | 6 | 0 |
| 35 | MF | (Malaysia) MAS | Nizarruddin Jazi | 1 | 0 | 0+1 | 0 | 0 | 0 | 0 | 0 |
Forwards
| 2 | FW | (Malaysia) MAS | Akmal Ishak | 0 | 0 | 0 | 0 | 0 | 0 | 0 | 0 |
| 9 | FW | (Malaysia) MAS | Nurshamil Abd Ghani | 6 | 1 | 0+5 | 0 | 0+1 | 1 | 0 | 0 |
| 10 | FW | (Nigeria) NGR | Ifedayo Olusegun | 15 | 14 | 9 | 8 | 0 | 0 | 6 | 6 |
| 13 | FW | (Malaysia) MAS | Fakri Saarani | 12 | 0 | 7+4 | 0 | 0+1 | 0 | 0 | 0 |
| 17 | FW | (Belarus) BLR | Yahor Zubovich | 29 | 19 | 19+3 | 12 | 2 | 3 | 4+1 | 4 |
| 19 | FW | (Malaysia) MAS | Fauzi Roslan | 18 | 1 | 2+11 | 0 | 1+1 | 1 | 0+3 | 0 |
| 25 | FW | (Malaysia) MAS | Farderin Kadir | 6 | 2 | 0+4 | 0 | 1+1 | 2 | 0 | 0 |
| 29 | FW | (South Korea) KOR | Lee Chang hoon | 8 | 4 | 4+1 | 2 | 0 | 0 | 3 | 2 |
Left club during season
| 10 | MF | (Portugal) POR | Tiago Gomes | 14 | 1 | 10+2 | 1 | 2 | 0 | 0 | 0 |
| 8 | MF | (South Korea) KOR | Jeon Woo-young | 14 | 2 | 13 | 2 | 1 | 0 | 0 | 0 |
| 22 | GK | (Malaysia) MAS | Faridzuean Kamaruddin | 2 | 5 | 1 | -2 | 1 | +7 | 0 | 0 |

Last updated: 15 September 2018
Source: Competitions

=== Clean sheets ===
| Rnk | No. | Player | Super League | FA Cup | League Cup | Total |
|---|---|---|---|---|---|---|
| 1 | 20 | (Malaysia) Khairul Fahmi | 2 | 0 | 1 | 3 |
| 2 | 11 | (Malaysia) Zamir Selamat | 2 | 0 | 0 | 2 |
| 3 | 22 | (Malaysia) Faridzuean Kamaruddin (Note: Faridzuean left the club during season.) | 0 | 1 | 0 | 1 |

== Notes ==
1. End of contract.
