= 2017 Melaka United season =

Melaka United
2017 season
- President: Idris Haron
- Manager: Yusoff Mahadi
- Head Coach: Eduardo Almeida (from 17 June 2017)
- Stadium: Hang Jebat Stadium (capacity:40,000)
- Super League: 8th
- FA Cup: Third round
- Malaysia Cup: Quarter-finals
- Top goalscorer: League: Marko Šimić (9); All: Marko Šimić (12)
- Highest home attendance: 14,336 vs Johor Darul Ta'zim (15 September 2017)
- Lowest home attendance: 1,288 vs UiTM (18 July 2017)
- Average home league attendance: 5,216
Home colours	Away colours

The 2017 season was Melaka United Soccer Association's 94th season in club history and 1st season in the Malaysia Super League after 10 years did not play in the top-tier league.

== Background ==
=== Background information ===
Melaka United won their first consecutive Malaysia Premier League championship in the 2016 season and promote to Malaysia Super League in the 2017 season. Melaka United were knocked out of the 2016 Malaysia FA Cup in the second round by Kuala Lumpur and knocked out of the 2016 Malaysia Cup in the group stage after failed to advance to knockout-stage.

In November 2016, the club has been rebranded to be fully privatise as Melaka United Football Club as one of the effort to be fully accountable and as a preparation to play in top-tier league, the Malaysia Super League in 2017 season. On 14 November 2016, Melaka United has announced the appointment of Eric Williams to replace Mat Zan Mat Aris as the new head coach for the club. Eric Williams has previously managed the Myanmar giant, Yangon United F.C. in 2014 season.

== Kit ==
- Supplier: Kronos
- Main sponsors: Edra & Mamee
- Other sponsors: Restoran Melayu, Hatten Groups

Home	Away	Goalkeeper	Goalkeeper

== Squads ==
=== First-team squad ===
No.	Name	Nat.	Position(s)	Join	Date of Birth (Age)	Signed from	Notes
Goalkeeper
1	Mohd Fazli Paat	(Malaysia)	GK	2017	27 November 1989 (aged 27)	(Malaysia) Johor Darul Ta'zim II	
20	Badrulzaman Abdul Halim	(Malaysia)	GK	2017	2 April 1978 (aged 38)	(Malaysia) Kuala Lumpur	
21	Muhd Syazwan Abdullah	(Malaysia)	GK	2017	2 April 1996 (aged 20)	(Malaysia) Kedah	Under-21 player
29	Mohd Firdaus Muhamad	(Malaysia)	GK	2017	3 January 1994 (aged 22)	(Malaysia) Penang	
30	Norhadi Ubaidillah	(Malaysia)	GK	2017	24 October 1987 (aged 29)	(Malaysia) Kuala Lumpur	
Defenders
3	Mohd Faizal Muhammad	(Malaysia)	CB	2017	3 March 1989 (aged 27)	(Malaysia) PDRM	
5	Nicholas Swirad	(Malaysia) (England)	CB	2017	28 May 1991 (aged 26)	(Malaysia) Johor Darul Ta'zim II	On loan
11	Mohd Fandi Othman	(Malaysia)	LB / LM	2017	25 April 1992 (aged 25)	(Malaysia) Johor Darul Ta'zim II	On loan
12	Ahmad Khuzaimi Piee	(Malaysia)	CB / LB / DM	2016	11 November 1993 (aged 23)	(Malaysia) (Selangor) PKNS	Originally from youth system
15	Mohd Akmal Md Zahir	(Malaysia)	CB	2017	16 February 1994 (aged 22)	(Malaysia) (Kuala Lumpur) Sime Darby	
16	Isma Alif Mohd Salim	(Malaysia)	RB	2017	22 February 1987 (aged 29)	(Malaysia) Kuala Lumpur	
18	Muhd Syawal Norsam	(Malaysia)	CB	2016	29 May 1989 (aged 27)	(Malaysia) Pahang FA	
25	Jasmin Mecinović	(North Macedonia)	CB	2017	22 October 1990 (aged 26)	(North Macedonia) FK Pelister	
26	Khair Jones	(Malaysia) (New Zealand)	CB / LB / LWB / RB / LM	2016	29 September 1989 (aged 27)	(New Zealand) Hawke's Bay United FC	
Midfielders
6	S. Sivanesan	(Malaysia)	AM / CM	2017	28 December 1990 (aged 26)	(Malaysia) (Selangor) PKNS	
7	Surendran Ravindran	(Malaysia)	RM / LM	2016	17 May 1987 (aged 29)	(Malaysia) Pahang	
8	Ahmad Ezrie Shafizie	(Malaysia)	CM / DM	2017	24 February 1986 (aged 30)	(Malaysia) (Kuala Lumpur) FELDA United	
10	Felipe Almeida De Souza	(Brazil)	AM / CM	2017	4 June 1991 (aged 25)	(Brazil) Oeste FC	
13	Mohd Norhakim Isa	(Malaysia)	CM / AM	2017	24 January 1993 (aged 24)	(Malaysia) Perak	
17	Mohd Azniee Taib	(Malaysia)	LM / AM	2017	18 July 1990 (aged 26)	(Malaysia) Johor Darul Ta'zim II	On loan
19	Jeon Woo-young	(South Korea)	CM / DM	2017	27 December 1987 (aged 29)	(South Korea) Jeonnam Dragons	
23	Jasmir Mehat	(Malaysia)	LM / AM	N/A	6 February 1994 (aged 22)	Youth system	
27	G. Puaneswaran	(Malaysia)	RM / LM / RB	2016	27 May 1983 (aged 33)	(Malaysia) Negeri Sembilan	
28	Muhd Nazri Ahmad	(Malaysia)	RM / LM / RB	2017	17 March 1990 (aged 26)	(Malaysia) Kuala Lumpur	
Forwards
9	Marko Šimić	(Croatia)	ST / CF / RM / LM	2017	22 January 1988 (aged 29)	(Malaysia) Negeri Sembilan	
14	Izzaq Faris Ramlan	(Malaysia)	ST / CF	2017	18 April 1990 (aged 26)	(Malaysia) (Terengganu) T–Team	
24	Mohd Fauzi Roslan	(Malaysia)	ST / CF / RM / LM / AM	2017	27 August 1988 (aged 28)	(Malaysia) Pahang	

=== Out on loan ===
No.	Name	Nat.	Position(s)	Join	Date of Birth (Age)	Signed from	Notes
19	Nurshamil Abd Ghani	(Malaysia)	ST / CF / AM	2015	25 September 1994 (aged 22)	(Malaysia) Harimau Muda B	Loan to Selangor
5	Abdul Thaufiq Abdul Haq	(Malaysia)	CB	2017	6 June 1988 (aged 28)	(Malaysia) (Selangor) Petaling Jaya Rangers	Loan to SAMB
4	Mohd Alif Shamsudin	(Malaysia)	RB / RWB / DM	2016	1 February 1986 (aged 30)	(Malaysia) (Kuala Lumpur) Sime Darby	Loan to FELCRA
2	Akmal Ishak	(Malaysia)	AM / ST / CM	2017	19 July 1994 (aged 22)	(Malaysia) Johor Darul Ta'zim II	Loan to Petaling Jaya Rangers
6	Tam Sheang Tsung	(Malaysia) (Japan)	LM / RM	2017	24 May 1995 (aged 21)	(Japan) Gainare Tottori	Loan to Kuala Lumpur

== Friendly matches ==
Win Draw Loss

17 December 2016 Friendly	Melaka United (Malacca)	2–0	(Kuala Lumpur) FELCRA	Melaka City, Malacca
16:45 UTC+8	Alif 55'; Nurshamil 78'			Stadium: Hang Tuah Stadium; Attendance: TBA

24 December 2016 Friendly	Melaka United (Malacca)	2–2	(Perak) PKNP	Melaka City, Malacca
16:45 UTC+8				Stadium: Hang Tuah Stadium

29 December 2016 Friendly	Melaka United (Malacca)	1–1	Johor Darul Ta'zim II	Melaka City, Malacca
21:00 UTC+8				Stadium: Hang Tuah Stadium

5 January 2017 Friendly	Army FC (Cambodia)	3–1	(Malaysia) Melaka United	Phnom Penh, Cambodia
--:-- UTC+7				Stadium: RCAF Old Stadium

6 January 2017 Friendly	Tiger FC (Cambodia)	Cancelled	(Malaysia) Melaka United	Siem Reap, Cambodia
--:-- UTC+7				Stadium: Siem Reap Stadium

8 January 2017 Friendly	Asia Euro United (Cambodia)	0–3	(Malaysia) Melaka United	Phnom Penh, Cambodia
--:-- UTC+7				Stadium: Olympic Stadium

9 January 2017 Friendly	Boeung Ket Angkor FC (Cambodia)	2–2	(Malaysia) Melaka United	Phnom Penh, Cambodia
--:-- UTC+7				Stadium: Olympic Stadium

14 January 2017 Friendly	Melaka United (Malacca)	1–2	(Kuala Lumpur) FELDA United	Malacca City, Malacca
--:-- UTC+7				Stadium: Hang Tuah Stadium

16 January 2017 Friendly	Melaka United (Malaysia)	0–2	(Singapore) Geylang International	Malacca City, Malacca
--:-- UTC+7				Stadium: Hang Tuah Stadium

12 May 2017 Friendly	Melaka United (Malacca)	0–3	(Malaysia) PDRM	Malacca City, Malacca
20:45 UTC+8				Stadium: Hang Tuah Stadium

6 June 2017 Friendly	Negeri Sembilan	2–3	(Malacca) Melaka United	Paroi, Negeri Sembilan
22:00 UTC+8				Stadium: Tuanku Abdul Rahman Stadium

19 June 2017 Friendly	Johor Darul Ta'zim II	1–3	(Malacca) Melaka United	Pasir Gudang, Johor
22:00 UTC+8				Stadium: Majlis Perbandaran Pasir Gudang Stadium

22 May 2017 Friendly	Melaka United (Malacca)	5–1	Malaysia U-22	Krubong, Malacca
22:00 UTC+8				Stadium: Hang Jebat Stadium

== Competitions ==
=== Overall ===
Competition	Started round	Current position / round	Final position / round	First match	Last match
Super League	Matchday 1	8th	8th	21 January 2017	28 October 2017
FA Cup	Second round	—	Third round	14 February 2017	11 March 2017
Malaysia Cup	Group stage	Quarter-finals	Quarter-finals	4 July 2017	24 September 2017

Updated to match played 28 October 2017
Source: Competitions

=== Overview ===
Competition	Record							
Competition	Pld	W	D	L	GF	GA	GD	Win %
Super League	22	6	6	10	33	45	−12	27.27
FA Cup	2	1	0	1	1	2	−1	50.00
Malaysia Cup	8	3	1	4	15	21	−6	37.50
Total	32	10	7	15	49	68	−19	31.25

Last updated: 28 October 2017
Source: Competitions

=== Malaysia Super League ===
==== Table ====
Pos	Team	Pld	W	D	L	GF	GA	GD	Pts	Qualification or relegation
6	Selangor	22	9	6	7	32	28	+4	33	
7	PKNS	22	6	7	9	33	38	−5	25	
8	Melaka United	22	6	6	10	33	46	−13	24	
9	T–Team (R)	22	7	5	10	30	45	−15	23 (Note: Kelantan and T–Team was sentenced to a six-point deduction immediately on offense failed to complete the registration process Malaysian League (M-League) 2017. Later, upon careful consideration of the aforementioned appeals, Football Malaysia have decided to lift the transfer ban and reduce the deduction of 6 points to 3 points for T-Team.)	Relegation to Premier League
10	Kelantan	22	7	4	11	31	39	−8	22 (Note: Kelantan and T–Team was sentenced to a six-point deduction immediately on offense failed to complete the registration process Malaysian League (M-League) 2017. Later, upon careful consideration of the aforementioned appeals, Football Malaysia have decided to only reduce the deduction of 6 points to 3 points for Kelantan.)	

Source: FAM, FMLLP
Rules for classification: 1) Points; 2) Goal difference; 3) Number of goals scored.
(R) Relegated

==== Results summary ====
Overall								Home						Away					
Pld	W	D	L	GF	GA	GD	Pts	W	D	L	GF	GA	GD	W	D	L	GF	GA	GD
22	6	6	10	33	45	−12	24	3	3	5	20	24	−4	3	3	5	13	21	−8

Last updated: 28 October 2017.
Source: Competitions

==== Results by matchday ====
Round	1	2	3	4	5	6	7	8	9	10	11	12	13	14	15	16	17	18	19	20	21	22
Ground	A	A	A	H	A	H	A	A	H	A	H	A	H	A	H	H	A	H	A	H	H	H
Result	W	D	L	L	W	L	D	L	D	L	D	L	D	D	L	L	L	W	W	W	W	L
Position	10	8	10	11	9	8	8	10	10	10	10	11	11	11	11	11	11	10	10	9	8	8

Updated to match(es) played on 28 October 2017. Source: Matches
A = Away; H = Home; W = Win; D = Draw; L = Loss

==== Matches ====
Win Draw Loss

21 February 2017 1	Kelantan	0–2	(Malacca) Melaka United	Kota Bharu, Kelantan
21:00 UTC+8		Report	59' Spasojević; 90+1' Fauzi	Stadium: Sultan Muhammad IV Stadium; Attendance: 8,963; Referee: Razlan Jeffri Ali

27 January 2017 2	Selangor	1–1	(Malacca) Melaka United	Selayang, Selangor
21:00 UTC+8	Astafei 81'	Report	69' Khairu	Stadium: Selayang Stadium; Attendance: 5,777; Referee: Muhd Nazmi Nasaruddin

4 February 2017 3	Perak	3–2	(Malacca) Melaka United	Ipoh, Perak
21:00 UTC+8	Thiago 31'; Pinto 64'; Mirchev 90+3'	Report	43' Woo-young; 79' Izzaq	Stadium: Perak Stadium; Attendance: 0 Referee: Nagor Amir Noor Mohamed

11 February 2017 4	Melaka United (Malacca)	1–2	(Terengganu) T–Team	Krubong, Malacca
21:00 UTC+8	Jeon 48'	Report	5' Samassa; 15' Tadjiyev	Stadium: Hang Jebat Stadium; Attendance: 7,322; Referee: Suresh Jayaraman

18 February 2017 5	Sarawak	0–1	(Malacca) Melaka United	Kuching, Sarawak
20:15 UTC+8		Report	14' Jeon	Stadium: Sarawak State Stadium; Attendance: 7,703++ Referee: Wan Mohamad Tarmizi

25 February 2017 6	Melaka United (Malacca)	1–3	Pahang	Krubong, Malacca
21:00 UTC+8	Khuzaimi 89'	Report	21' Joseph; 42' Matheus; 56' Sumareh	Stadium: Hang Jebat Stadium; Attendance: 12,151; Referee: Muhd Nazmi Nasaruddin

1 March 2017 7	Penang	1–1	(Malacca) Melaka United	Batu Kawan, Penang
21:00 UTC+8	Lobo 88'	Report	6' Khuzaimi	Stadium: Penang State Stadium; Attendance: 1,288; Referee: Mohd Amirul Izwan Yaacob

4 March 2017 8	Kedah	4–0	(Malacca) Melaka United	Alor Setar, Kedah
21:00 UTC+8	Ilsø 34', 90+3'; Sandro 49', 79'	Report		Stadium: Darul Aman Stadium; Attendance: 25,000; Referee: S. Sittharanjanan

26 April 2017 9	Melaka United (Malacca)	2–2	(Selangor) PKNS	Krubong, Malacca
21:00 UTC+8	Spasojević 33', 43'	Report	36' Wleh; 41' Safee	Stadium: Hang Jebat Stadium; Attendance: 2,399; Referee: Khairul Azuan Kidam

9 April 2017 10	Johor Darul Ta'zim	7–0	(Malacca) Melaka United	Johor Bahru, Johor
21:00 UTC+8	Guerra 7'; Safiq 18', 59', 81' (pen.); Amirul 23'; Cabrera 34'; Azamuddin 47'	Report		Stadium: Tan Sri Dato Haji Hassan Yunos Stadium; Attendance: 14,475; Referee: Razlan Jeffri Ali

15 April 2017 11	Melaka United (Malacca)	1–1	(Kuala Lumpur) FELDA United	Krubong, Malacca
21:00 UTC+8	Khair 82'	Report	90+2' Cano	Stadium: Hang Jebat Stadium; Attendance: 2,711; Referee: Mohd Amirul Izwan Yaacob

24 May 2017 12	FELDA United (Kuala Lumpur)	3−0	(Malacca) Melaka United	Jengka, Pahang
21:00 UTC+8	Cano 29'; Krangar 33'; Cellerino 85' (pen.)	Report		Stadium: Tun Abdul Razak Stadium; Attendance: 1,367; Referee: Muhd Rahmat Jantan

6 May 2017 13	Melaka United (Malacca)	1–1	Johor Darul Ta'zim	Krubong, Malacca
21:00 UTC+8	Jeon Woo-young 88'	Report	59' Safiq	Stadium: Hang Jebat Stadium; Attendance: 11,037; Referee: Suhaimi Mat Hassan

1 July 2017 14	PKNS (Selangor)	1–1	(Malacca) Melaka United	Shah Alam Selangor
21:00 UTC+8	Safee 70' (pen.)	Report	50' Felipe	Stadium: Shah Alam Stadium; Attendance: 2,616; Referee: Muhd Nazmi Nasaruddin

11 July 2017 15	Melaka United (Malacca)	2–4	Kedah	Krubong, Malacca
21:00 UTC+8	Šimić 10', 31'	Report	15', 41' Baddrol; 56' Akram; 90+4' Asri	Stadium: Hang Jebat Stadium; Attendance: 7,048; Referee: Zulkarnain Zakaria

15 July 2017 16	Melaka United (Malacca)	2–3	Penang	Krubong, Malacca
21:00 UTC+8	Šimić 36', 89' (pen.)	Report	5' Faiz; 54' Hartmann; 61' Kumaahran	Stadium: Hang Jebat Stadium; Attendance: 4,004++ Referee: Mohd Nafeez Abdul Wahab

22 July 2017 17	Pahang	2–0	(Malacca) Melaka United	Kuantan, Pahang
21:00 UTC+8	Romero 5'; Sumareh 53'	Report		Stadium: Darul Makmur Stadium; Attendance: 2,455; Referee: Razlan Jeffri Ali

26 July 2017 18	Melaka United (Malacca)	4–2	Sarawak	Krubong, Malacca
21:00 UTC+8	Šimić 31'; Fauzi 35'; Surendran 39'; Felipe 90+3'	Report	23' Roskam; 29' Tommy	Stadium: Hang Jebat Stadium; Attendance: 2,237; Referee: Wan Mohamad Tarmizi

5 August 2017 19	T–Team (Terengganu)	1–5	(Malacca) Melaka United	Kuala Terengganu, Terengganu
21:00 UTC+8	Fauzi 33'	Report	50', 89' Šimić; 61', 70' Fauzi; 74' Felipe	Stadium: Sultan Ismail Nasiruddin Shah Stadium; Attendance: 700; Referee: Razlan Jeffri Ali

20 September 2017 20	Melaka United (Malacca)	3–1	Perak	Krubong, Malacca
21:00 UTC+8	Šimić 300'; Jeon Woo-young 72'; Felipe 83' (pen.)	Report	50' Shahrul	Stadium: Hang Jebat Stadium; Attendance: 1,683; Referee: Suresh Jayaraman

27 September 2017 21	Melaka United (Malacca)	2–1	Selangor	Krubong, Malacca
21:00 UTC+8	Mecinović 6'; Šimić 42'	Report	Rufino 57'	Stadium: Hang Jebat Stadium; Attendance: 2,059; Referee: Mohd Fairuzi Mat Desa

28 October 2017 22	Melaka United (Malacca)	1–3	Kelantan	Krubong, Malacca
21:00 UTC+8	Swirad 30'	Report	Bako 75'; Celin 81', 88'	Stadium: Hang Jebat Stadium; Attendance: 4,723; Referee: Wan Mohd Tarmizi Wan Ibrahim

=== Malaysia FA Cup ===
Win Draw Loss

14 February 2017 Second Round	Melaka United (Malacca)	1–0	(Selangor) PKNS	Krubong, Malacca
21:00 UTC+8	Amri 66'	Report		Stadium: Hang Jebat Stadium; Attendance: 4,002; Referee: Zulkarnain Zakaria

11 March 2017 Third Round	Pahang	2–0	(Malacca) Melaka United	Kuantan, Pahang
21:00 UTC+8				Stadium: Darul Makmur Stadium

=== Malaysia Cup ===
==== Group stage ====
Pos	Team	Pld	W	D	L	GF	GA	GD	Pts	Qualification	KDH	MLK	KLT	UITM
1	Kedah	6	5	0	1	17	5	+12	15	Advance to knockout phase	—	2–0	2–0	1–0
2	(Malacca) Melaka United	6	3	0	3	13	16	−3	9	Advance to knockout phase	2–6	—	3–0	2–1
3	Kelantan	6	2	0	4	8	12	−4	6		3–1	2–3	—	3–1
4	(Selangor) UiTM	6	2	0	4	9	14	−5	6		0–5	5–3	2–0	—

Updated to match(es) played on 9 September 2017. Source: FAM FMLLP

Win Draw Loss

4 July 2017 Group stage	Kedah	2–0	(Malacca) Melaka United	Alor Setar, Kedah
21:00 UTC+8	Sandro 29'; Baddrol 64'	Report		Stadium: Darul Aman Stadium; Attendance: 4,500; Referee: Mohd Amirul Izwan Yaacob

8 July 2017 Group stage	Melaka United (Malacca)	3–0	Kelantan	Krubong, Malacca
21:00 UTC+8	Šimić 21'; Surendran 30'; Fauzi 49'	Report		Stadium: Hang Jebat Stadium; Attendance: 5,529; Referee: Khairul Azuan Kidam

18 July 2017 Group stage	Melaka United (Malacca)	2–1	(Selangor) UiTM	Krubong, Malacca
21:00 UTC+8	Felipe 23', 64'	Report	45+1' Sunday	Stadium: Hang Jebat Stadium; Attendance: 1,288; Referee: Khairul Azuan Kidam

29 July 2017 Group stage	Melaka United (Malacca)	2–6	Kedah	Krubong, Malacca
21:00 UTC+8	Azniee 22'; Fauzi 53'	Report	5' Fakri; 35', 39' Sandro; 45+3' Akram; 77' Ilsø; 90' Akhyar	Stadium: Hang Jebat Stadium; Attendance: 6,548; Referee: Suhaimi Mat Hassan

2 August 2017 Group stage	Kelantan	2–3	(Malacca) Melaka United	Kota Bharu, Kelantan
21:00 UTC+8	Danso 51'; Izuan 86'	Report	Jeon Woo-young 5', 31'; Šimić 33'	Stadium: Sultan Muhammad IV Stadium; Attendance: 2,699; Referee: Suhaimi Mat Hassan

9 September 2017 Group stage	UiTM (Selangor)	5–3	(Malacca) Melaka United	Shah Alam, Selangor
21:00 UTC+8	Wasiu 13', 38' (pen.), 90+1'; Do Dong-hyun 30', 73'	Report	Jeon Woo-young 33'; Azinee 56'	Stadium: UiTM Stadium; Attendance: 439; Referee: Samsudin Ibrahim

==== Knock-out stage ====
Quarter-finals

15 September 2017 First Leg	Melaka United (Malacca)	1–4	Johor Darul Ta'zim	Krubong, Melaka
21:00 UTC+8	Šimić 45+1'	Report	Ghaddar 7', 34'; Insa 68'; Safiq 85'	Stadium: Hang Jebat Stadium; Attendance: 14,336; Referee: Khairul Azuan Kidam

24 September 2017 Second Leg	Johor Darul Ta'zim	1–1 (5–2 agg.)	(Malacca) Melaka United	Larkin, Johor
21:00 UTC+8	Nazmi 21'	Report	Felipe 44' (pen.)	Stadium: Tan Sri Dato' Haji Hassan Yunos Stadium; Attendance: 10,230; Referee: Zulkarnain Zakaria

== Statistics ==
=== Appearances ===
No.	Name	League		FA Cup		Malaysia Cup		Total	
No.	Name	Apps	Goals	Apps	Goals	Apps	Goals	Apps	Goals
Goalkeepers
1	(Malaysia) Mohd Fazli Paat	15	0	2	0	4 (1)	0	21 (1)	0
20	(Malaysia) Badrulzaman Abdul Halim	6	0	0	0	2 (1)	0	8 (1)	0
21	(Malaysia) Muhd Syazwan Abdullah	0	0	0	0	0	0	0	0
29	(Malaysia) Mohd Firdaus Muhamad	1	0	0	0	1	0	2	0
30	(Malaysia) Norhadi Ubaidillah	0	0	0	0	1	0	1	0
Defenders
3	(Malaysia) Mohd Faizal Muhammad	13 (3)	0	2	0	4 (1)	0	19 (4)	0
5	(Malaysia) Nicholas Swirad	8 (1)	1	0	0	3	0	11 (1)	1
11	(Malaysia) Mohd Fandi Othman	0 (5)	0	0	0	2 (1)	0	2 (6)	0
12	(Malaysia) Ahmad Khuzaimi Piee	10 (5)	2	1 (1)	0	2 (1)	0	13 (7)	2
15	(Malaysia) Mohd Akmal Md Zahir	0	0	0	0	1	0	1	0
16	(Malaysia) Isma Alif Mohd Salim	1	0	0	0	1	0	2	0
18	(Malaysia) Muhd Syawal Norsam	2 (2)	0	0	0	4	0	6 (2)	0
25	(North Macedonia) Jasmin Mecinović	5	1	0	0	5	0	10	1
26	(Malaysia) Khair Jones	21 (1)	1	2	0	6	0	29 (1)	1
Midfielders
6	(Malaysia) S. Sivanesan	5 (1)	0	1	0	3 (1)	0	9 (2)	0
7	(Malaysia) Surendran Ravindran	19 (1)	1	2	0	5 (1)	1	26 (2)	2
8	(Malaysia) Ahmad Ezrie Shafizie	11 (8)	0	2	0	4 (2)	0	17 (10)	0
10	(Brazil) Felipe Almeida De Souza	9	4	0	0	8	3	17	7
13	(Malaysia) Mohd Norhakim Isa	2 (2)	0	0	0	3 (2)	0	5 (4)	0
17	(Malaysia) Mohd Azniee Taib	0 (2)	0	0 (1)	0	4 (1)	2	4 (4)	2
19	(South Korea) Jeon Woo-young	19 (1)	5	1	0	7	3	27 (1)	8
23	(Malaysia) Jasmir Mehat	0 (8)	0	0	0	1 (6)	0	1 (14)	0
27	(Malaysia) G. Puaneswaran	21	1	2	0	5	0	28	1
28	(Malaysia) Muhd Nazri Ahmad	1 (4)	0	0	0	1	0	2 (4)	0
Forwards
9	(Croatia) Marko Šimić	9	9	0	0	5 (1)	3	14 (1)	12
14	(Malaysia) Izzaq Faris Ramlan	0 (5)	1	0	0	0 (2)	0	0 (7)	1
24	(Malaysia) Mohd Fauzi Roslan	10 (10)	3	0 (2)	0	5 (3)	3	15 (15)	6
Players transferred out or on loan during the season
2	(Malaysia) Akmal Ishak	0	0	0 (1)	0	0	0	0 (1)	0
4	(Malaysia) Mohd Alif Shamsudin	0	0	0	0	0	0	0	0
5	(Malaysia) Abdul Thaufiq Abdul Haq	0	0	0	0	0	0	0	0
6	(Malaysia) Tam Sheang Tsung	0	0	0	0	0	0	0	0
9	(Montenegro) Ilija Spasojević	9 (1)	3	1	0	0	0	10 (1)	3
10	(Argentina) Sergio Ezequiel Agüero	7 (1)	0	1	0	0	0	8 (1)	0
11	(Philippines) Omid Nazari	0	0	0	0	0	0	0	0
13	(Malaysia) Muhd Khairu Azrin Khazali	12	1	2	0	0	0	14	1
17	(Malaysia) Mohd Amri Yahyah	10	0	2	1	0	0	12	1
19	(Malaysia) Nurshamil Abd Ghani	0	0	0	0	0	0	0	0
22	(Malaysia) Syed Sobri Syed Mohamad	4 (2)	0	0 (1)	0	0	0	4 (3)	0
25	(Ghana) Godwin Antwi	11 (1)	0	2	0	0	0	13 (1)	0
–	(Malaysia) Ashvin Tharumanathan	0	0	0	0	0	0	0	0

Last updated: 28 October 2017.
Source: Competitions

=== Top scorers ===
The list is sorted by shirt number when total clean sheets are equal.

Rnk	Pos	No.	Player	League	FA Cup	Malaysia Cup	Total
1	FW	9	(Croatia) Marko Šimić	9	0	3	12
2	MF	19	(South Korea) Jeon Woo-young	5	0	3	8
2	FW	24	(Malaysia) Mohd Fauzi Roslan	4	0	3	7
4	MF	10	(Brazil) Felipe Almeida De Souza	4	0	3	7
5	FW	9	(Montenegro) **Ilija Spasojević**	3	0	0	3
6	MF	7	(Malaysia) Surendran Ravindran	1	0	1	2
6	DF	12	(Malaysia) Ahmad Khuzaimi Piee	2	0	0	2
8	MF	5	(Malaysia) Nicholas Swirad	1	0	0	1
8	MF	13	(Malaysia) **Khairu Azrin Khazali**	1	0	0	1
8	FW	14	(Malaysia) Izzaq Faris Ramlan	1	0	0	1
8	FW	17	(Malaysia) **Mohd Amri Yahyah**	0	1	0	1
8	MF	17	(Malaysia) Azinee Taib	0	0	2	2
8	DF	25	(North Macedonia) Jasmin Mecinović	1	0	0	1
8	DF	26	(Malaysia) Khair Jones	1	0	0	1
#	Own goals			0	0	0	0
**Total**				**33**	**1**	**15**	49

* Player names in bold denotes transferred out or on loan during the season

Last updated: 28 October 2017.
Source: Competitions

=== Clean sheets ===
The list is sorted by shirt number when total clean sheets are equal.

Rnk	No.	Player	League	FA Cup	Malaysia Cup	Total
1	1	(Malaysia) Mohd Fazli Paat	2	1	0	**3**
**Total**			**2**	**1**	**0**	**3**

Last updated: 28 October 2017.
Source: Competitions

=== Discipline ===
The list is sorted by shirt number when total clean sheets are equal.

Rnk	Pos	No.	Player	Yellow card	Red card
1	DF	12	(Malaysia) Ahmad Khuzaimi Piee	3	0
2	DF	3	(Malaysia) Mohd Faizal Muhammad	2	0
2	MF	5	(Malaysia) Nicholas Swirad	2	0
2	MF	8	(Malaysia) Ahmad Ezrie Shafizie	2	0
2	DF	25	(North Macedonia) Jasmin Mecinović	2	0
6	GK	1	(Malaysia) Mohd Fazli Paat	1	0
6	MF	7	(Malaysia) Surendran Ravindran	1	0
6	MF	10	(Brazil) Felipe Almeida De Souza	1	0
6	FW	10	(Argentina) **Sergio Ezequiel Agüero**	1	0
6	MF	13	(Malaysia) Norhakim Isa	1	0
6	MF	13	(Malaysia) **Khairu Azrin Khazali**	1	0
6	MF	19	(South Korea) Jeon Woo-young	1	0
6	MF	27	(Malaysia) G. Puaneswaran	1	0
**Total**				**19**	**0**

* Player names in bold denotes transferred out or on loan during the season

Last updated: 28 October 2017.
Source: Competitions

== Transfers ==
=== In ===
==== Early season ====
Date	Pos	No	Player	Transferred From	Note(s)
November 2016	MF		(Malaysia) Ahmad Ezrie Shafizie	(Malaysia) FELDA United	
November 2016	DF		(Ghana) Godwin Antwi	(Malaysia) DRB-HICOM	
November 2016	MF		(Philippines) Omid Nazari	(Philippines) Global	
November 2016	FW		(Malaysia) Izzaq Faris Ramlan	(Malaysia) T–Team	
November 2016	FW		(Malaysia) Mohd Fauzi Roslan	(Malaysia) Pahang	
November 2016	DF		(Malaysia) Mohd Faizal Muhammad	(Malaysia) PDRM	
November 2016	MF		(Malaysia) Khairu Azrin Khazali	(Malaysia) PKNS	
November 2016	MF		(Malaysia) Akmal Ishak	(Malaysia) Johor Darul Ta'zim II	
November 2016	MF		(Malaysia) Syed Sobri Syed Mohamad	(Malaysia) Sime Darby	
November 2016	DF		(Malaysia) Mohd Akmal Md Zahir	(Malaysia) Sime Darby	
1 December 2016	MF		(Malaysia) Tam Sheang Tsung	(Japan) Gainare Tottori	
13 December 2016	FW		(Argentina) Ezequiel Agüero	(Hungary) Tatabánya	
15 December 2016	GK		(Malaysia) Mohd Firdaus Muhamad	(Malaysia) Penang	
15 December 2016	GK		(Malaysia) Mohd Fazli Paat	(Malaysia) Johor Darul Ta'zim II	
15 December 2016	GK		(Malaysia) Muhd Syazwan Abdullah	(Malaysia) Kedah	
15 December 2016	DF		(Malaysia) Abdul Thaufiq Abdul Haq	(Malaysia) Petaling Jaya Rangers	
15 December 2016	GK		(Malaysia) Norhadi Ubaidillah	(Malaysia) Kuala Lumpur	
16 December 2016	FW		(Malaysia) Mohd Amri Yahyah	(Malaysia) Johor Darul Ta'zim	
December 2016	MF		(Malaysia) Isma Alif Mohd Salim	(Malaysia) Kuala Lumpur	
December 2016	MF		(Malaysia) Muhd Nazri Ahmad	(Malaysia) Kuala Lumpur	
December 2016	MF		(Malaysia) Ashvin Tharumanathan	(Malaysia) University of Queensland	
23 January 2017	MF		(South Korea) Jeon Woo-young	(South Korea) Jeonnam Dragons	

==== Mid-season ====
Date	Pos	No	Player	Transferred From	Note(s)
May 2017	DF		(North Macedonia) Jasmin Mecinović	(North Macedonia) Pelister	
June 2017	MF		(Brazil) Felipe Almeida De Souza	(Brazil) Oeste	
June 2017	MF		(Malaysia) Mohd Norhakim Isa	(Malaysia) Perak	
June 2017	MF		(Malaysia) S. Sivanesan	(Malaysia) PKNS	
June 2017	MF		(Malaysia) Mohd Azniee Taib	(Malaysia) Johor Darul Ta'zim II	loan
June 2017	DF		(Malaysia) Mohd Fandi Othman	(Malaysia) Johor Darul Ta'zim II	loan
June 2017	DF		(Malaysia) Nicholas Swirad	(Malaysia) Johor Darul Ta'zim II	loan
May 2017	FW		(Croatia) Marko Šimić	(Malaysia) Negeri Sembilan	

=== Out ===
==== Early season ====
Date	Pos	No	Player	Transferred To	Note(s)
November 2016	DF	15	(Malaysia) Ahmad Shahir Ismail	(Malaysia) SAMB	
November 2016	FW	30	(Malaysia) Mohd Syazwan Nordin	(Malaysia) Felcra	
November 2016	DF	55	(Romania) Alexandru Tudose	(Romania) Târgu Mureș	
November 2016	MF	10	(Sweden) Labinot Harbuzi	Released	
November 2016	MF	59	(Malaysia) Ahmad Ezrie Shafizie	(Malaysia) FELDA United	End of Loan
November 2016	MF	60	(Malaysia) Mohd Ferris Danial	(Malaysia) FELDA United	End of Loan
November 2016	MF	13	(Malaysia) See Kok Luen	(Malaysia) Petaling Jaya Rangers	
November 2016	GK	29	(Malaysia) Muhammad Syazwan Yusoff	(Malaysia) Kelantan	End of Loan
November 2016	GK	1	(Malaysia) Ahmad Solehin Mamat	(Malaysia) Kuala Lumpur	
November 2016	DF	20	(Malaysia) Wan Amirul Afiq	(Malaysia) FELDA United	
November 2016	DF	11	(Malaysia) Fiqri Azwan Ghazali	(Malaysia) Felcra	
November 2016	MF	16	(Malaysia) Iskandar Hanapiah	(Malaysia) Petaling Jaya Rangers	
November 2016	MF	12	(Malaysia) R. Barath Kumar	(Malaysia) Petaling Jaya Rangers	
November 2016	MF	57	(Malaysia) Mohd Saiful Mustafa	(Malaysia) Petaling Jaya Rangers	
November 2016	GK	52	(Malaysia) Mohd Fadzley Rahim	(Malaysia) Petaling Jaya Rangers	
November 2016	MF	8	(Malaysia) Mohd Hazri Rozali		
November 2016	MF	58	(Malaysia) Reeshafiq Alwi	(Malaysia) MOF	
November 2016	FW	51	(Palestine) Yashir Pinto	(Malaysia) Perak	
November 2016	DF	5	(Malaysia) Mohammad Abdul Aziz Ismail	Kelantan	
January 2017	FW	19	(Malaysia) Nurshamil Abd Ghani	(Malaysia) Selangor	On loan
23 January 2017	MF	11	(Philippines) Omid Nazari	(Philippines) Ceres-Negros	Terminated

==== Mid-season ====
Date	Pos	No	Player	Transferred To	Note(s)
May 2017	FW		(Malaysia) Mohd Amri Yahyah	(Malaysia) Selangor	
May 2017	MF		(Malaysia) Syed Sobri Syed Mohamad	(Malaysia) T–Team	
May 2017	MF		(Malaysia) Khairu Azrin Khazali	(Malaysia) PKNS	
May 2017	FW		(Argentina) Sergio Agüero		
May 2017	DF		(Ghana) Godwin Antwi		
May 2017	FW		(Montenegro) Ilija Spasojević	(Indonesia) Bhayangkara	
