= Nicholas Swirad =

English professional footballer

Nick Swirad
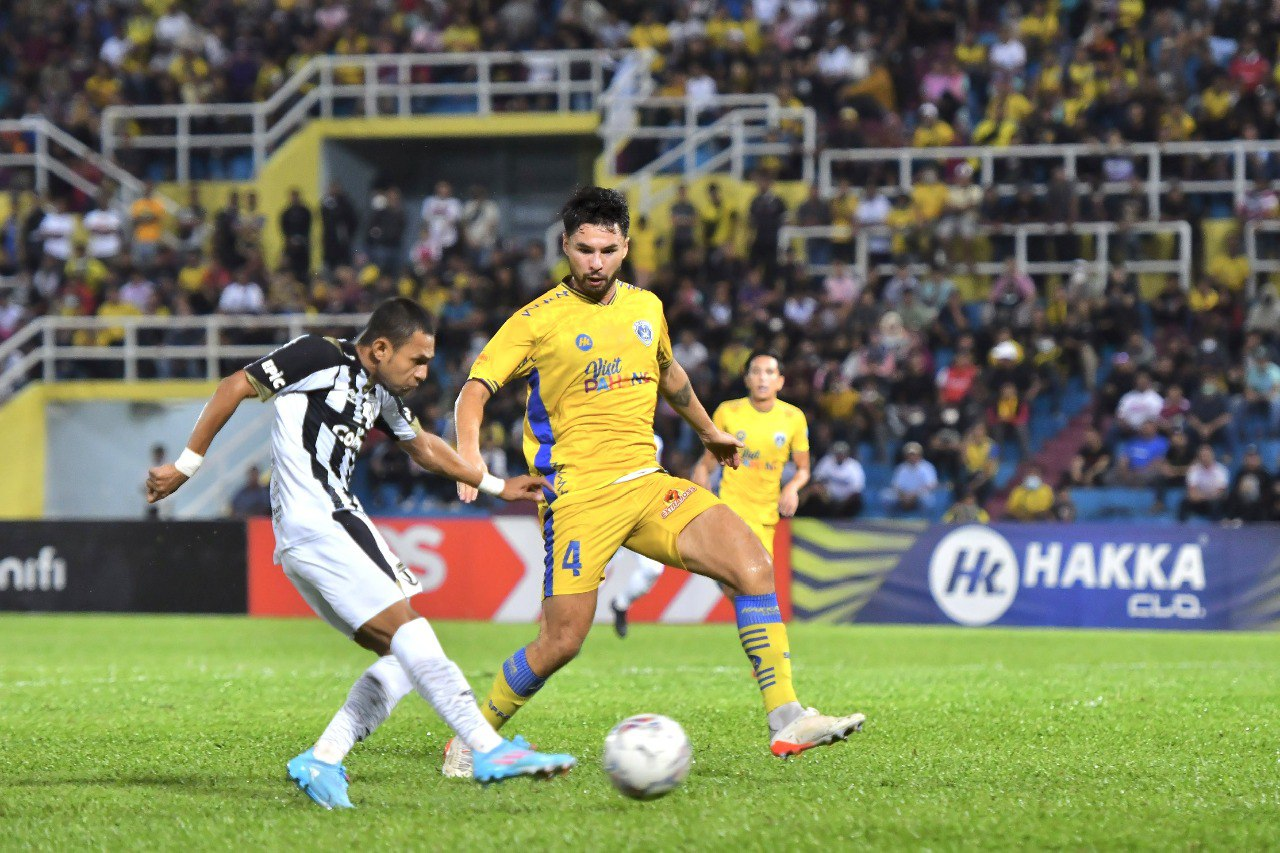
- Swirad (right) playing for Sri Pahang in 2022

Personal information
- Full name: Nicholas Ryan Swirad
- Date of birth: 28 May 1991 (age 35)
- Place of birth: Manchester, England
- Height: 1.83 m (6 ft 0 in)
- Position: Centre-back

Team information
- Current team: DPMM FC
- Number: 20

Youth career
- FC United of Manchester

Senior career*
| Years | Team | Apps | (Gls) |
| 2008–2010 | FC United of Manchester | 17 | (0) |
| 2012–2014 | Stocksbridge Park Steels | 50 | (8) |
| 2015 | Northern Rangers | 16 | (2) |
| 2016–2017 | Johor Darul Ta'zim II | 22 | (0) |
| 2017–2018 | Melaka United | 39 | (2) |
| 2019 | PKNS | 22 | (4) |
| 2020 | Selangor | 4 | (0) |
| 2020 | Nongbua Pitchaya | 4 | (1) |
| 2021–2023 | Sri Pahang | 53 | (0) |
| 2024–2025 | Kuala Lumpur City | 8 | (1) |
| 2026 | Immigration | 11 | (0) |
| 2026– | DPMM | 5 | (0) |
- * Club domestic league appearances and goals as of 20 November 2026

Nicholas Ryan Swirad (born 28 May 1991) is an English professional footballer who plays as a centre-back for Malaysia Super League side DPMM FC.

== Club career ==
Swirad started his senior career with FC United of Manchester, making his debut at the age of 17 having played for the Manchester FA's youth and academy programme at the Manchester College. He went on to play 17 matches for the club before representing several other clubs in the Manchester region including New Mills, Mossley, Ashton United and Stocksbridge Park Steels.

After playing in non-league football in England, he spent a year coaching at an academy in New Jersey, USA before joining NPL Tasmania side Northern Rangers in 2015, playing 16 matches and scoring 2 goals for the club in all competitions.

=== Johor Darul Ta'zim II ===
At the end of the 2015–16 season, Swirad left Northern Rangers to sign for Johor Darul Ta'zim II of the Malaysia Premier League, playing 22 games under coach Benjamin Mora and helping the team finish 3rd in the league standings.

=== Melaka United ===
On 12 June 2017, Swirad joined Super League team Melaka United on loan for the remainder of the 2017 season. There, he helped to maintain the club's Super League status under new coach Eduardo Almeida. In his 18 months at the club, he made 38 appearances, scoring 2 goals including a last minute winner against Selangor FA on the 21st of July, 2018.

=== PKNS ===
Swirad joined Selangor based Super League side PKNS FC for the 2019 season under coach K Rajagobal. He scored 4 goals in 23 games for the team, earning an international call-up to the Malaysia national football team, in what was PKNS' final season as an independent Super League club.

=== Selangor ===
After his selection to represent Selangor in their 1–0 win against Singapore FA in the 2019 Sultan of Selangor trophy Swirad joined Selangor FA the following season under coach B. Sathianathan. However, he struggled with injuries making only 4 appearances for the club in a COVID-19 hit season that saw the league reduced to 11 from 22 matches only.

=== Nongbua Pitchaya ===
On 1 January 2021, Swirad joined Thai Division 2 team Nongbua Pitchaya FC, looking to secure promotion to Thai League 1 on a short-term deal.

In a month at the club, he played 4 games scoring the final goal of the season in a 3–0 win against Kasetsart FC, which confirmed the club as league champions.

He signed a contract extension with the club for the 2021-22 Thai League 1 season, but was unable to register due to visa restrictions requiring ASEAN imports to have made 3 international appearances.

=== Sri Pahang ===
Unable to continue with Nongbua, Swirad signed for Sri Pahang FC on his 30th birthday, which was aired live on Astro Arena. He made his league debut for the club against Sabah in Kota Kinabalu, coming on for Ashar Al Aafiz Abdullah in the 83rd minute. His full debut was against JDT on the 27th of August 2021, in Johor Bahru, a performance which stamped his place in the first team for the remainder of season, including in the 2021 Malaysia Cup.

Swirad extended his contract with Sri Pahang until 2022, and went on to captain the side for a majority of the season.

=== Kuala Lumpur City ===
In March 2024, Swirad returned to the Klang Valley to join Kuala Lumpur City, making his debut in the FA Cup fixture from the bench against Kuching City. In his first full start, he scored the equalizing goal against Kelantan Darul Naim - his first goal in the Super League since 2019 and for the club - in a comeback victory for the team.

=== Immigration ===
On 24 January 2026, Swirad joined Malaysia Super League side Immigration. He made his debut for the team in the Super League match against JDT on 1st of February, replacing Loqman Hakim. He started his first match on March 1 against Kuching City and went on to cement a place in the starting eleven for the rest of the season, helping the team secure an impressive sixth place finish.

=== DPMM ===
On 24 June 2026, Swirad was revealed by MSL invited team DPMM FC of Brunei as having signed for the 2026–27 season. He made his first appearance off the bench in the 83rd minute, in a 0–1 win over Penang on 23 August, and subsequently his first league start against his former club KL City on 29 August.

Swirad revealed in October that he suffered heatstroke in training the previous month where he collapsed and was unconscious for a minute, prompting the Crown Prince of Brunei who was in attendance, to come down from the stands to the field. Initially feared it was a heart attack, it kept him out of action for close to two months before he returned to action in a full circle moment, against JDT.

== International career ==
In March 2019, Swirad received his first call-up to the Malaysia national football team, but a groin injury prevented him from making his debut. Malaysia national team head coach Tan Cheng Hoe spoke highly of Swirad during his call-up: "I’ve been monitoring him since last year, and to me, he is a quality player. He is versatile and able to play anywhere at the back. I hope to see him recover quickly and make his national debut as a centre back against Singapore."

Nick received his second call-up in 2022, ahead of the AFF Mitsubishi Electric Cup. However family issues prevented him from joining up with the main team during the first week of training camp and he was then placed on the standby list.

In 2023, Nick was named on the standby list for the national team ahead of two international friendlies against Syria and China, to prepare for the upcoming Asian Cup.

== Career statistics ==
=== Club ===
As of match played 20 November 2026

Appearances and goals by club, season and competition
| Club | Season | League | | | FA Cup | | Malaysia Cup | | MFL Challenge Cup | | Total | |
| Club | Season | Division | Apps | Goals | Apps | Goals | Apps | Goals | Apps | Goals | Apps | Goals |
|---|---|---|---|---|---|---|---|---|---|---|---|---|
| Johor Darul Ta'zim II | 2016 | Malaysia Premier League | 10 | 0 | 0 | 0 | 5 | 0 | | | 15 | 0 |
| Johor Darul Ta'zim II | 2017 | Malaysia Premier League | 6 | 0 | 1 | 0 | 0 | 0 | | | 7 | 0 |
| Johor Darul Ta'zim II | Total | | 16 | 0 | 1 | 0 | 5 | 0 | | | 22 | 0 |
| Melaka United | 2017 | Malaysia Super League | 10 | 1 | 0 | 0 | 3 | 0 | | | 13 | 1 |
| Melaka United | 2018 | Malaysia Super League | 19 | 1 | 1 | 0 | 6 | 0 | | | 26 | 1 |
| Melaka United | Total | | 29 | 2 | 1 | 0 | 9 | 0 | | | 39 | 2 |
| PKNS | 2019 | Malaysia Super League | 15 | 3 | 3 | 0 | 4 | 1 | | | 22 | 4 |
| Selangor | 2020 | Malaysia Super League | 4 | 0 | 0 | 0 | 0 | 0 | | | 4 | 0 |
| Nongbua Pitchaya | 2020 | Thai League 2 | 4 | 1 | 0 | 0 | 0 | 0 | | | 4 | 1 |
| Sri Pahang | 2021 | Malaysia Super League | 8 | 0 | 0 | 0 | 6 | 0 | | | 14 | 0 |
| Sri Pahang | 2022 | Malaysia Super League | 20 | 0 | 2 | 0 | 2 | 0 | | | 24 | 0 |
| Sri Pahang | 2023 | Malaysia Super League | 12 | 0 | 2 | 0 | 1 | 0 | | | 15 | 0 |
| Sri Pahang | Total | | 40 | 0 | 4 | 0 | 9 | 0 | | | 53 | 0 |
| Kuala Lumpur City | 2024 | Malaysia Super League | 7 | 1 | 1 | 0 | 0 | 0 | | | 8 | 1 |
| Immigration | 2026 | Malaysia Super League | 10 | 0 | – | – | – | – | 1 | 0 | 11 | 0 |
| DPMM | 2026–27 | Malaysia Super League | 5 | 0 | 2 | 0 | 0 | 0 | 0 | 0 | 7 | 0 |
| Career Total | | | 130 | 7 | 12 | 0 | 27 | 1 | 1 | 0 | 170 | 8 |

== Honours ==
Nongbua Pitchaya

- Thai League 2 champions: 2020–21

== Personal life ==
Born in Manchester, Swirad's father is from England and his mother is a Chinese-descent from Malaysia. He also worked for Malaysian sports channel Astro Supersport, hosting Man on the Street with Reem Shahwa where they connected local fans with ex-football legends including Dimitar Berbatov, Michael Owen, Henrik Larsson, Manu Petit and Jaap Stam.

Swirad used to work as a security guard at the Manchester Apollo in Ardwick whilst attending the Manchester College nearby.
