= Kittiphong Pluemjai =

Thai-Norwegian footballer (born 1993)

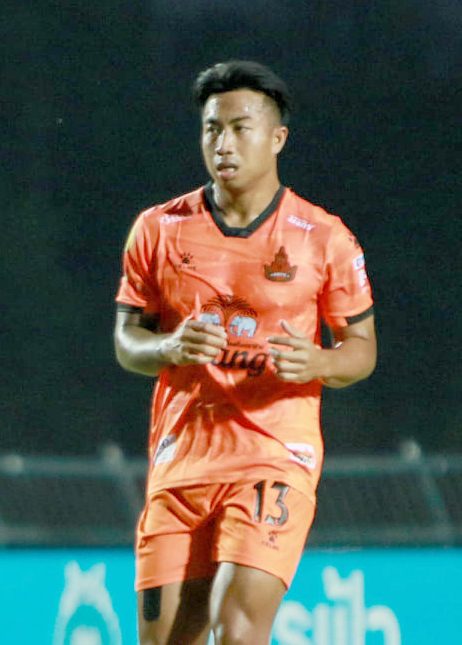
- Kittiphong Pluemjai playing for Udon Thani.

Personal information
- Full name: Kittiphong Pluemjai
- Date of birth: 29 March 1993 (age 33)
- Place of birth: Surin, Thailand
- Height: 1.73 m (5 ft 8 in)
- Position: Striker

Youth career
- 2010–2012: SK Brann

Senior career*
| Years | Team | Apps | (Gls) |
| 2013 | Nest-Sotra | 16 | (7) |
| 2014 | Buriram United | 1 | (0) |
| 2014 | → Surin City (loan) | 21 | (10) |
| 2015 | Sukhothai | 10 | (3) |
| 2015 | → Phrae United (loan) | 9 | (2) |
| 2016 | Nest-Sotra | 24 | (13) |
| 2017 | Nongbua Pitchaya | 3 | (0) |
| 2017 | Chainat Hornbill | 1 | (0) |
| 2018 | Angthong | 15 | (4) |
| 2019 | Lysekloster IL | 4 | (0) |
| 2019–2020 | Selangor II | 3 | (1) |
| 2020–2021 | Bangkok | 16 | (3) |
| 2021–2022 | Udon Thani | 30 | (2) |
| 2022 | Songkhla | 2 | (1) |
| 2023 | Pattani | 8 | (1) |
| 2023–2024 | Udon United | 19 | (7) |
| 2024 | Chiangmai | 7 | (0) |
- * Club domestic league appearances and goals as of 19 March 2024

Kittiphong Pluemjai (Thai: กิตติพงษ์ ปลื้มใจ, born 29 March 1993) is a Thai-Norwegian footballer who plays as a striker.

== Career ==
He played junior football for SK Brann, but never broke into the senior team, and went on loan to Nest-Sotra. He then tried his luck in Thailand with Buriram United in Thai Premier League and AFC Champions League. He joined Buriram United in December 2013, when he was on trial at the club during his holiday in Thailand.

He was training with Thailand`s National team in November 2011.

Pluemjai later played for clubs including Regional League Division 2 club Phrae United. In 2016, he returned to Norway with Nest-Sotra.
