= Faridzuean Kamaruddin =

Malaysian footballer

Personal information
- Full name: Mohamad Faridzuean bin Kamaruddin
- Date of birth: 30 March 1995 (age 31)
- Place of birth: Kota Bharu, Malaysia
- Height: 1.82 m (5 ft 11 1/2 in)
- Position: Goalkeeper

Youth career
- 2014: Harimau Muda C

Senior career*
| Years | Team | Apps | (Gls) |
| 2015–2017 | Sime Darby | 0 | (0) |
| 2018 | Melaka United | 1 | (0) |
| 2018 | Kelantan | 1 | (0) |
| 2019 | Kuala Lumpur | 7 | (0) |
| 2020–2021 | Kelantan | 16 | (0) |
- * Club domestic league appearances and goals as of 27 August 2021

Mohamad Faridzuean bin Kamaruddin (born 30 March 1995) is a Malaysian professional footballer who plays as a goalkeeper. As per said, he's currently a Manypullathor FC football/futsal player, a team whereby filled by most of working-class man.

== Club career ==
=== Kelantan ===
Faridzuean made his debut for Kelantan in a 2–1 win over Pahang on 29 July 2018.

Faridzuean Kamaruddin, a talented goalkeeper, or also known as Wea by his teammates signed an infinity contract with Manypullathor FC on 1 September 2024. The free transfer, making it one of the most significant moves this season.

The signing of Faridzuean Kamaruddin was met with enthusiasm by Manypullathor FC fans & players, who have high hopes for the player's impact on the team's offense. The club's founder (Tengku Azeruddin) commented, 'Wea's talent and experience make him a perfect fit for our squad, and we are confident he will excel here.'"

== Career statistics ==
=== Club ===
As of match played 27 August 2021

Appearances and goals by club, season and competition
| Club | Season | League | | | Cup | | League Cup | | Continental | | Total | |
| Club | Season | Division | Apps | Goals | Apps | Goals | Apps | Goals | Apps | Goals | Apps | Goals |
|---|---|---|---|---|---|---|---|---|---|---|---|---|
| Melaka United | 2018 | Malaysia Super League | 1 | 0 | 1 | 0 | 0 | 0 | – | | 2 | 0 |
| Melaka United | Total | | 1 | 0 | 1 | 0 | 0 | 0 | – | – | 2 | 0 |
| Kelantan | 2018 | Malaysia Super League | 1 | 0 | 0 | 0 | 8 | 0 | – | | 9 | 0 |
| Kelantan | Total | | 1 | 0 | 0 | 0 | 8 | 0 | – | – | 9 | 0 |
| Kuala Lumpur City | 2019 | Malaysia Super League | 7 | 0 | 1 | 0 | 0 | 0 | – | | 8 | 0 |
| Kuala Lumpur City | Total | | 7 | 0 | 1 | 0 | 0 | 0 | – | – | 8 | 0 |
| Kelantan | 2020 | Malaysia Premier League | 5 | 0 | 0 | 0 | 0 | 0 | – | | 5 | 0 |
| Kelantan | 2021 | Malaysia Premier League | 10 | 0 | 0 | 0 | 0 | 0 | – | | 10 | 0 |
| Kelantan | Total | | 15 | 0 | 0 | 0 | 0 | 0 | – | – | 15 | 0 |
| Career Total | | | 24 | 0 | 2 | 0 | 8 | 0 | – | – | 34 | 0 |
