= 2020 Kelantan F.C. season =

Kelantan
2020 season
- President: Shaari Mat Hussin
- Head coach: Yusri Che Lah
- Stadium: Sultan Muhammad IV Stadium
- Malaysia Premier League: 6th
- Malaysia FA Cup: Cancelled
- Malaysia Cup: Round of 16
- Top goalscorer: League: Felix Odili (4); All: Felix Odili (4)

The 2020 season was Kelantan's 75th year in their history and second season in the Malaysia Premier League since 2019 following relegation 2018 season. Along with the league, the club also participated in the Malaysia FA Cup and the Malaysia Cup.

== Events ==
On 22 February 2020, the club launched their Jerseys and kits.

On 2 March 2020, the club has announced that Christopher Jackson injured and unable to play anytime soon. Lazarus Kaimbi joined the club from Sri Pahang.

On 13 July 2020, Kang Seung-jo left the club for K2 League club Gyeongnam.

On 15 August 2020, the club launched new jerseys after former main sponsor After Image withdrew their sponsorship. Stechmad Sdn Bhd became club's new main sponsor afterwards.

On 3 September 2020, Norizam Tukiman completed his purchased of the club from Kelantan Football Association for a reported RM6.8 million.

On 29 September 2020, the club has been officially approved for the privatization by Football Association of Malaysia.

On 3 October 2020, Kelantan draw 2-2 over Negeri Sembilan in league match.

On 8 December 2020, five players have confirmed to leave the club.

== Players ==
=== First-team squad ===
Note: Flags indicate national team as defined under FIFA eligibility rules; some limited exceptions apply. Players may hold more than one non-FIFA nationality.

No.	Pos.	Nation	Player
1	GK	(Malaysia) MAS	Fikri Che Soh
2	DF	(Japan) JPN	Masaki Watanabe
3	DF	(Malaysia) MAS	Afiq Azuan
5	DF	(Malaysia) MAS	Shahrul Nizam
6	DF	(Malaysia) MAS	Farisham Ismail
7	MF	(Malaysia) MAS	Khairul Rizam
8	MF	(Malaysia) MAS	Wan Zaharulnizam
9	FW	(Namibia) NAM	Lazarus Kaimbi (3rd-captain)
10	MF	(South Korea) KOR	Kang Seung-jo
11	FW	(Nigeria) NGA	Felix Chidi Odili
12	MF	(Malaysia) MAS	Hakimi Abdullah
13	DF	(Malaysia) MAS	Azwan Aripin
14	DF	(Malaysia) MAS	Wan Afiq Kasbi
15	DF	(Malaysia) MAS	Khairul Asyraf

No.	Pos.	Nation	Player
17	MF	(Malaysia) MAS	Danial Ashraf
18	DF	(Malaysia) MAS	Syaiful Alias
20	MF	(Malaysia) MAS	Nazrin Nawi (captain)
22	GK	(Malaysia) MAS	Arif Abdullah
23	FW	(Malaysia) MAS	Afiq Saluddin
25	MF	(Malaysia) MAS	Azrul Ahmad (vice-captain)
26	MF	(Malaysia) MAS	Nik Azli
27	MF	(Malaysia) MAS	Juzaerul Jasmi
28	MF	(Malaysia) MAS	Amirul Shafik
29	MF	(Malaysia) MAS	Imran Samso
30	GK	(Malaysia) MAS	Faridzuean Kamaruddin
33	MF	(Malaysia) MAS	Nik Akif
61	FW	(Malaysia) MAS	Muslim Kamaruddin
62	DF	(Malaysia) MAS	Syahadan Pauzi

== Competitions ==
=== Malaysia Premier League ===
==== League table ====
Pos	Team	Pld	W	D	L	GF	GA	GD	Pts
4	Kuching	11	5	1	5	17	19	−2	16
5	Johor Darul Ta'zim II (Note: Johor Darul Ta'zim II, Perak II, Selangor II and Terengganu II cannot be promoted from Malaysia Premier League and play in Malaysia Cup as Johor Darul Ta'zim F.C., Perak FA, Selangor F.C. and Terengganu FC (their parent clubs) remain in Malaysia Super League and play in Malaysia Cup. Should the team be relegated to Malaysia Premier League or will not play in Malaysia Cup, Johor Darul Ta'zim II, Perak II, Selangor II and Terengganu II will have to drop to Malaysia M3 League or will play in Malaysia Cup.)	11	4	3	4	20	17	+3	15
6	Kelantan	11	5	3	3	14	11	+3	15 (Note: Kelantan have been docked three points following the club’s failure to comply with FIFA’s decision.)
7	Selangor II	11	4	1	6	17	23	−6	13
8	Kelantan United	11	4	0	7	13	19	−6	12

Updated to match(es) played on 31 October 2020. Source: MFL
Rules for classification: 1) Points; 2) Goal difference; 3) Number of goals scored.

==== Matches ====
29 February 2021 1	Kelantan	1–1	Kuala Lumpur
MYT (UTC+8)

10 March 2021 2	Kelantan	2–0	Kelantan United
MYT (UTC+8)

13 March 2021 3	Terengganu II	2–1	Kelantan
MYT (UTC+8)

22 August 2021 4	UKM	1–5	Kelantan
MYT (UTC+8)

29 August 2021 5	Kelantan	0–3	Penang
MYT (UTC+8)

5 September 2021 6	Selangor	0–0	Kelantan
MYT (UTC+8)

12 September 2021 7	Kelantan	1–0	Perak II
MYT (UTC+8)

20 September 2021 8	Kuching	2–0	Kelantan
MYT (UTC+8)

25 September 2021 9	Kelantan	1–0	Sarawak United
MYT (UTC+8)

3 October 2021 10	Kelantan	2–2	Negeri Sembilan
MYT (UTC+8)

9 October 2021 11	Johor Darul Ta'zim II	0–1	Kelantan
MYT (UTC+8)

=== Malaysia Cup ===
8 November 2020 Round of 16	UiTM	3–2	Kelantan
MYT (UTC+8)

== Statistics ==
=== Appearances and goals ===
No.	Pos	Nat	Player	Total		League		Malaysia Cup	
No.	Pos	Nat	Player	Apps	Goals	Apps	Goals	Apps	Goals
Goalkeepers
1	GK	(Malaysia) MAS	Fikri Che Soh	6	0	5	0	1	0
22	GK	(Malaysia) MAS	Arif Abdullah	1	0	1	0	0	0
30	GK	(Malaysia) MAS	Faridzuean Kamaruddin	5	0	5	0	0	0
Defenders
2	DF	(Japan) JPN	Masaki Watanabe	8	0	8	0	0	0
3	DF	(Malaysia) MAS	Afiq Azuan	3	0	3	0	0	0
5	DF	(Malaysia) MAS	Shahrul Nizam	11	0	10	0	1	0
6	DF	(Malaysia) MAS	Farisham Ismail	2	0	0+2	0	0	0
13	DF	(Malaysia) MAS	Azwan Aripin	9	0	7+1	0	1	0
14	DF	(Malaysia) MAS	Wan Afiq Kasbi	3	0	3	0	0	0
15	DF	(Malaysia) MAS	Khairul Asyraf	10	0	6+3	0	1	0
18	DF	(Malaysia) MAS	Syaiful Alias	4	0	2+2	0	0	0
62	DF	(Malaysia) MAS	Syahadan Pauzi	0	0	0	0	0	0
Midfielders
7	MF	(Malaysia) MAS	Khairul Rizam	3	0	0+2	0	1	0
8	MF	(Malaysia) MAS	Wan Zaharulnizam	7	0	5+2	0	0	0
12	MF	(Malaysia) MAS	Hakimi Abdullah	10	3	6+3	3	1	0
17	MF	(Malaysia) MAS	Danial Ashraf	10	3	5+4	1	1	2
20	MF	(Malaysia) MAS	Nazrin Nawi	6	1	3+3	1	0	0
25	MF	(Malaysia) MAS	Azrul Ahmad	10	0	8+2	0	0	0
26	MF	(Malaysia) MAS	Nik Azli	3	0	0+3	0	0	0
27	MF	(Malaysia) MAS	Juzaerul Jasmi	1	0	0+1	0	0	0
28	MF	(Malaysia) MAS	Amirul Shafik	11	1	6+4	1	1	0
29	MF	(Malaysia) MAS	Imran Samso	8	0	6+1	0	1	0
33	MF	(Malaysia) MAS	Nik Akif	12	2	11	2	1	0
Forwards
9	FW	(Namibia) NAM	Lazarus Kaimbi	12	2	10+1	2	1	0
11	FW	(Nigeria) NGA	Felix Chidi Odili	11	4	10+1	4	0	0
23	FW	(Malaysia) MAS	Afiq Saluddin	0	0	0	0	0	0
61	FW	(Malaysia) MAS	Muslim Kamaruddin	0	0	0	0	0	0
Players transferred out during the season
10	MF	(South Korea) KOR	Kang Seung-jo	1	0	1	0	0	0

Last updated: 9 October 2020
Source: Competitions
