= Steven Thicot =

French footballer (born 1987)

Personal information
- Full name: Steven Gary Narvey Thicot
- Date of birth: 14 February 1987 (age 39)
- Place of birth: Montreuil, France
- Height: 1.86 m (6 ft 1 in)
- Positions: Centre back; defensive midfielder

Youth career
- 2000–2003: INF Clairefontaine
- 2003–2005: Nantes

Senior career*
Years	Team	Apps	(Gls)
2005–2008	Nantes	0	(0)
2006–2007	→ Sedan (loan)	3	(0)
2008–2011	Hibernian	37	(0)
2012–2013	Naval	42	(3)
2013–2014	Dinamo București	20	(2)
2015–2016	Belenenses	9	(0)
2016	Tondela	16	(0)
2017	AEL	8	(0)
2018	Melaka United	19	(0)
2019	Charlotte Independence	29	(0)
2020–2021	Kauno Žalgiris	45	(0)
2022–2023	Clyde	15	(2)
2023–2024	Camelon	5	(1)

International career
2004	France U17	5	(0)
Medal record
Men's football
Representing France
UEFA European Under-17 Championship
Winner	2004 France
- * Club domestic league appearances and goals

Steven Thicot (born 14 February 1987) is a French former footballer who played as a central defender or as a defensive midfielder. Besides France, he has played in Scotland, Romania, Spain, Greece, Malaysia, the United States, and Lithuania.

== Club career ==
Born in Montreuil, Seine-Saint-Denis, Thicot was trained at the Clairefontaine academy and was part of the France national youth football team that won the 2004 UEFA European Under-17 Football Championship. He signed for Nantes in 2003, but he did not play for their first team. He was loaned to Sedan for the 2006–07 season, for whom he appeared three times in Ligue 1, but he was eventually released by Nantes in June 2008.

=== Hibernian ===
Thicot went on trial with Scottish Premier League club Hibernian, for whom he appeared as a substitute in a pre-season friendly against FC Barcelona. He signed for Hibernian on 29 July 2008, and made his Scottish Premier League debut in the 1–0 defeat at Kilmarnock in early August. Thicot had to be substituted after just 33 minutes due to a thigh injury that kept him out of action for "weeks". He returned to the team in a 2–1 win at Aberdeen, but was again substituted.

Thicot became a regular under Mixu Paatelainen, but the Finnish manager left Hibs at the end of the 2008–09 season. John Hughes, who was appointed to replace Paatelainen, initially gave Thicot fewer opportunities in the team; Thicot made his first appearance of the 2009–10 season in January. Thicot continued to feature in the team infrequently under Colin Calderwood, and was advised in April 2011 that his contract would not be renewed.

Thicot then signed for Portuguese club Naval.

=== Dinamo București ===
In August 2013, Thicot signed a contract for three years with Romanian club Dinamo București. He scored his first goal for Dinamo on 6 October, in a match against Ceahlăul Piatra Neamț.

=== Back in Portugal: Belenenses and Tondela ===
In the 2014–15 season Thicot played for Belenenses Lisabon and helped them to finish 7th in Portugal Liga NOS. In the first half of the 2015–16 season Thicot was without club, eventually he signed for Tondela in January 2016, in that time last placed club in Portugal League, but they succeed to stay in league with series of good results in second half of season and finally won in last round and secure their place in top league.

=== Charlotte ===
In March 2019, he moved to Charlotte Independence.

=== Lithuania: FK Kauno Žalgiris ===
On 3 March 2020 m. in their official website FK Kauno Žalgiris announced the signing the French player. The club finished 4th last season in the domestic league, and it is promising an opportunity to play in 2020–21 UEFA Europa League. After season of 2021 he left FK Kauno Žalgiris.

=== Clyde ===
On 12 May 2022, Thicot made his return to Scotland and penned a one-year deal with Scottish League One side Clyde.
