= Mohd Fazli Paat =

Malaysian footballer

Fazli Paat
Personal information
- Full name: Mohd Fazli bin Paat
- Date of birth: 27 November 1987 (age 38)
- Place of birth: Johor, Malaysia
- Height: 1.79 m (5 ft 10 1/2 in)
- Position: Goalkeeper

Senior career*
Years	Team	Apps	(Gls)
2010–2013	Johor Darul Ta'zim	2	(0)
2014–2015	Sabah	0	(0)
2016	Johor Darul Ta'zim II	0	(0)
2017–2019	Melaka United	16	(0)
- * Club domestic league appearances and goals as of 28 July 2018

Mohd Fazli bin Paat (born 27 November 1987) is a Malaysian footballer who plays as a goalkeeper for Malaysian club Melaka United.
